= 5th federal electoral district of Chihuahua =

Federal electoral district of Mexico

Chihuahua's 5th
- Electoral district of the Chamber of Deputies of Mexico

- Chihuahua's 5th district since 2022

Incumbent
- Member: Juan Antonio Meléndez Ortega
- Party: ▌Institutional Revolutionary Party
- Congress: 66th (2024–2027)

District
- State: Chihuahua
- Head town: Delicias
- Coordinates: 28°6′N 106°0′W
- Covers: 14 municipalities: Aldama, Aquiles Serdán, Camargo, Coyame del Sotol, Delicias, La Cruz, Jiménez, Julimes, Manuel Benavides, Meoqui, Ojinaga, Rosales, San Francisco de Conchos, Saucillo
- PR region: First
- Precincts: 351
- Population: 421,054 (2020 census)

5th district in 2017–2022

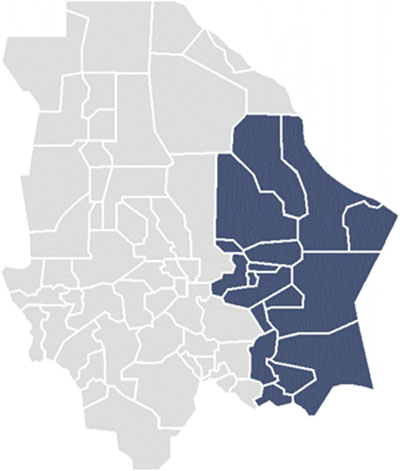
5th district in 2005–2017

The 5th federal electoral district of Chihuahua (Spanish: Distrito electoral federal 05 de Chihuahua) is one of the 300 electoral districts into which Mexico is divided for elections to the federal Chamber of Deputies and one of nine such districts in the state of Chihuahua.

It elects one deputy to the lower house of Congress for each three-year legislative session by means of the first-past-the-post system. Votes cast in the district also count towards the calculation of proportional representation ("plurinominal") deputies elected from the first region.

The current member for the district, elected in the 2024 general election, is Juan Antonio Meléndez Ortega of the Institutional Revolutionary Party (PRI).

== District territory ==
Under the 2022 districting plan adopted by the National Electoral Institute (INE), which is to be used for the 2024, 2027 and 2030 federal elections, the district covers 351 electoral precincts (secciones electorales) across 14 municipalities in the east of the state:

- Aldama, Aquiles Serdán, Camargo, Coyame del Sotol, Delicias, La Cruz, Jiménez, Julimes, Manuel Benavides, Meoqui, Ojinaga, Rosales, San Francisco de Conchos and Saucillo.

The head town (cabecera distrital), where results from individual polling stations are gathered together and tallied, is the city of Delicias. The district reported a population of 421,054 in the 2020 census.

== Previous districting schemes ==
Evolution of electoral district numbers
	1974	1978	1996	2005	2017	2023
Chihuahua	6	10	9	9	9	9
Chamber of Deputies	196	300				

2017–2022
Between 2017 and 2022 the 5th district comprised the same municipalities as in the 2022 plan, with its head town at Delicias.

2005–2017
Under the 2005 districting scheme, the 5th district was located in the east of the state, but its configuration was slightly different. It covered the municipalities of Aldama, Allende, Aquiles Serdán, Camargo, Coronado, Coyame del Sotol, Delicias, Jiménez, Julimes, La Cruz, López, Manuel Benavides, Meoqui, Ojinaga, Rosales, San Francisco de Conchos and Saucillo. The head town was the city of Delicias.

1996–2005
Chihuahua lost its 10th district in the 1996 redistricting process. Under the 1996 scheme, the 5th district was located in the same region of the state as in later plans, with a slightly different configuration. It covered the municipalities of Aldama, Aquiles Serdán, Camargo, Coyame del Sotol, Delicias, Julimes, La Cruz, Manuel Benavides, Meoqui, Ojinaga, Rosales, San Francisco de Conchos and Saucillo.

1978–1996
The districting scheme in force from 1978 to 1996 was the result of the 1977 electoral reforms, which increased the number of single-member seats in the Chamber of Deputies from 196 to 300. Under that plan, Chihuahua's seat allocation rose from six to ten. The 5th district was located in the west of the state, covering a large area of the Sierra Madre Occidental. It was centred on the city of Vicente Guerrero and comprised the municipalities of Bachíniva, Bocoyna, Carichí, Chínipas, Gómez Farías, Guazapares, Guerrero, Maguarichi, Matachí, Moris, Namiquipa, Ocampo, Temósachi and Uruachi.

== Deputies returned to Congress ==
(Mexico) National parties
- Current
- PAN
- PRI
- PT
- PVEM
- MC
- Morena
- PAZ
- Somos
- Defunct or local only
- PLM
- PNR
- PRM
- PNM
- PP
- PPS
- PARM
- PFCRN
- CON
- PANAL
- PSD
- PES
- PES
- PRD

Chihuahua's 5th district
Election	Deputy	Party	Term	Legislature
1976	Artemio Iglesias	Institutional Revolutionary Party	1976–1979	50th Congress
1979	Enrique Pérez González	Institutional Revolutionary Party	1979–1982	51st Congress
1982	Samuel Díaz Olguín	Institutional Revolutionary Party	1982–1985	52nd Congress
1985	Alonso Aguirre Ramos	Institutional Revolutionary Party	1985–1988	53rd Congress
1988	Jorge Esteban Sandoval	Institutional Revolutionary Party	1988–1991	54th Congress
1991	Pablo Israel Esparza Natividad	Institutional Revolutionary Party	1991–1994	55th Congress
1994	Saúl González Herrera	Institutional Revolutionary Party	1994–1997	56th Congress
1997	Ignacio Arrieta Aragón	Institutional Revolutionary Party	1997–2000	57th Congress
2000	César Reyes Roel	National Action Party (Mexico)	2000–2003	58th Congress
2003	Fernando Álvarez Monje	National Action Party (Mexico)	2003–2006	59th Congress
2006	Felipe González Ruiz	National Action Party (Mexico)	2006–2009	60th Congress
2009	Guillermo Márquez Lizalde	Institutional Revolutionary Party	2009–2012	61st Congress
2012	Abraham Montes Alvarado	Institutional Revolutionary Party	2012–2015	62nd Congress
2015	Juan Antonio Meléndez Ortega	Institutional Revolutionary Party	2015–2018	63rd Congress
2018	Mario Mata Carrasco	National Action Party (Mexico)	2018–2021	64th Congress
2021	Mario Mata Carrasco; Salvador Alcántar Ortega	National Action Party (Mexico)	2021–2022; 2022–2023	65th Congress
2024	Juan Antonio Meléndez Ortega	Institutional Revolutionary Party	2024–2027	66th Congress

=== Congressional results ===
The corresponding page on the Spanish-language Wikipedia contains full electoral results from 1964 to 2021.

== Presidential elections ==
Chihuahua's 5th district
Election	District won by	Party or coalition	%
2018	Andrés Manuel López Obrador	Juntos Haremos Historia	42.2148
2024	Claudia Sheinbaum Pardo	Sigamos Haciendo Historia	45.2436
