= Municipalities of Chihuahua =

List of municipalities of Mexican state

Map of Mexico with Chihuahua highlighted

Chihuahua is a state in northwest Mexico that is divided into 67 municipalities. According to the 2020 INEGI census, Chihuahua is the 12th most populous state with 3,741,869 inhabitants and the largest by land area spanning 247,798.08 square kilometres (95,675.37 sq mi).

Municipalities in Chihuahua are administratively autonomous of the state according to the 115th article of the 1917 Constitution of Mexico. Every three years, citizens elect a municipal president (Spanish: presidente municipal) by a plurality voting system who heads a concurrently elected municipal council (ayuntamiento) responsible for providing all the public services for their constituents. The municipal council consists of a variable number of trustees and councillors (regidores y síndicos). Municipalities are responsible for public services (such as water and sewerage), street lighting, public safety, traffic, and the maintenance of public parks, gardens and cemeteries. They may also assist the state and federal governments in education, emergency fire and medical services, environmental protection and maintenance of monuments and historical landmarks. Since 1984, they have had the power to collect property taxes and user fees, although more funds are obtained from the state and federal governments than from their own income.

The largest municipality by population is Juárez, Mexico's sixth largest municipality, with 1,512,450 residents or approximately 40.4 percent of the state population. The smallest municipality by population is Huejotitán, with 824 residents. The largest municipality by land area is Ahumada, which spans 16,927.60 km^{2} (6,535.78 sq mi), and the smallest is Santa Bárbara, which spans 346.15 km^{2} (133.65 sq mi). The first municipality to incorporate was Rosales, on July 8, 1820, and the newest municipality is Guachochi, which incorporated on January 9, 1963.

== Municipalities ==
Largest municipalities in Chihuahua by population

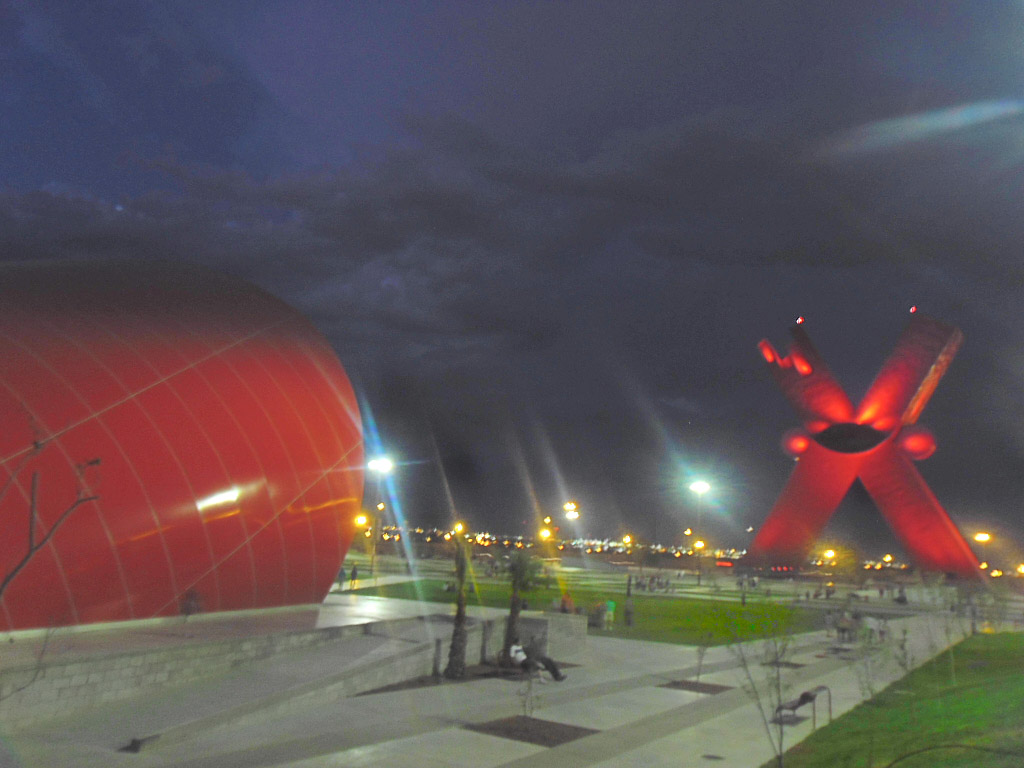
Ciudad Juárez, the largest municipality by population in Chihuahua.

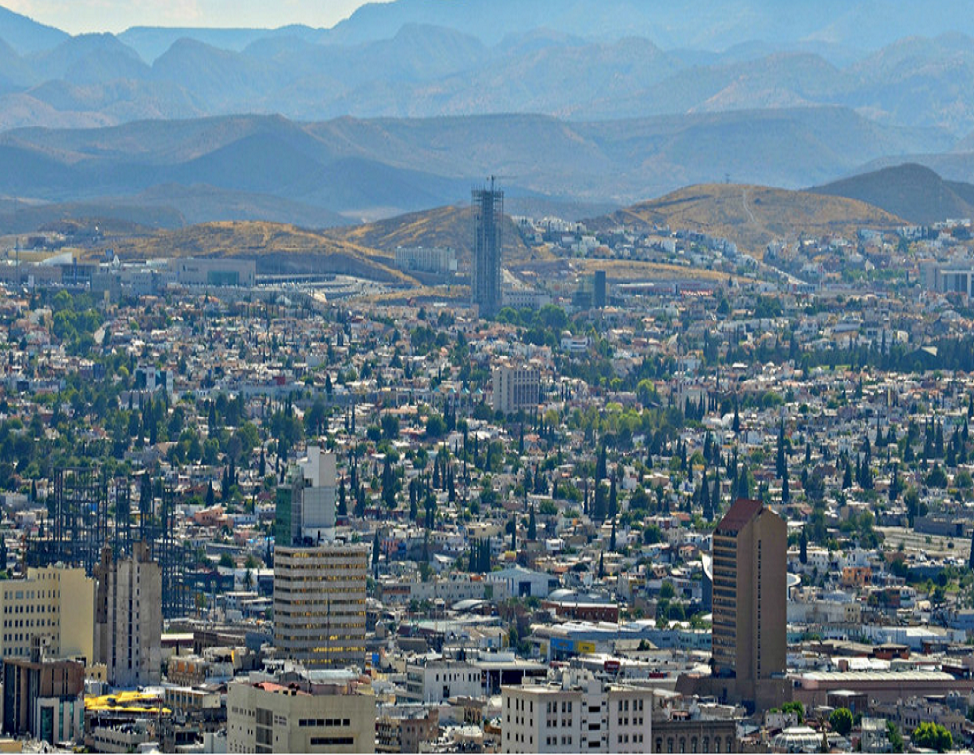
Chihuahua, capital and second largest municipality by population.

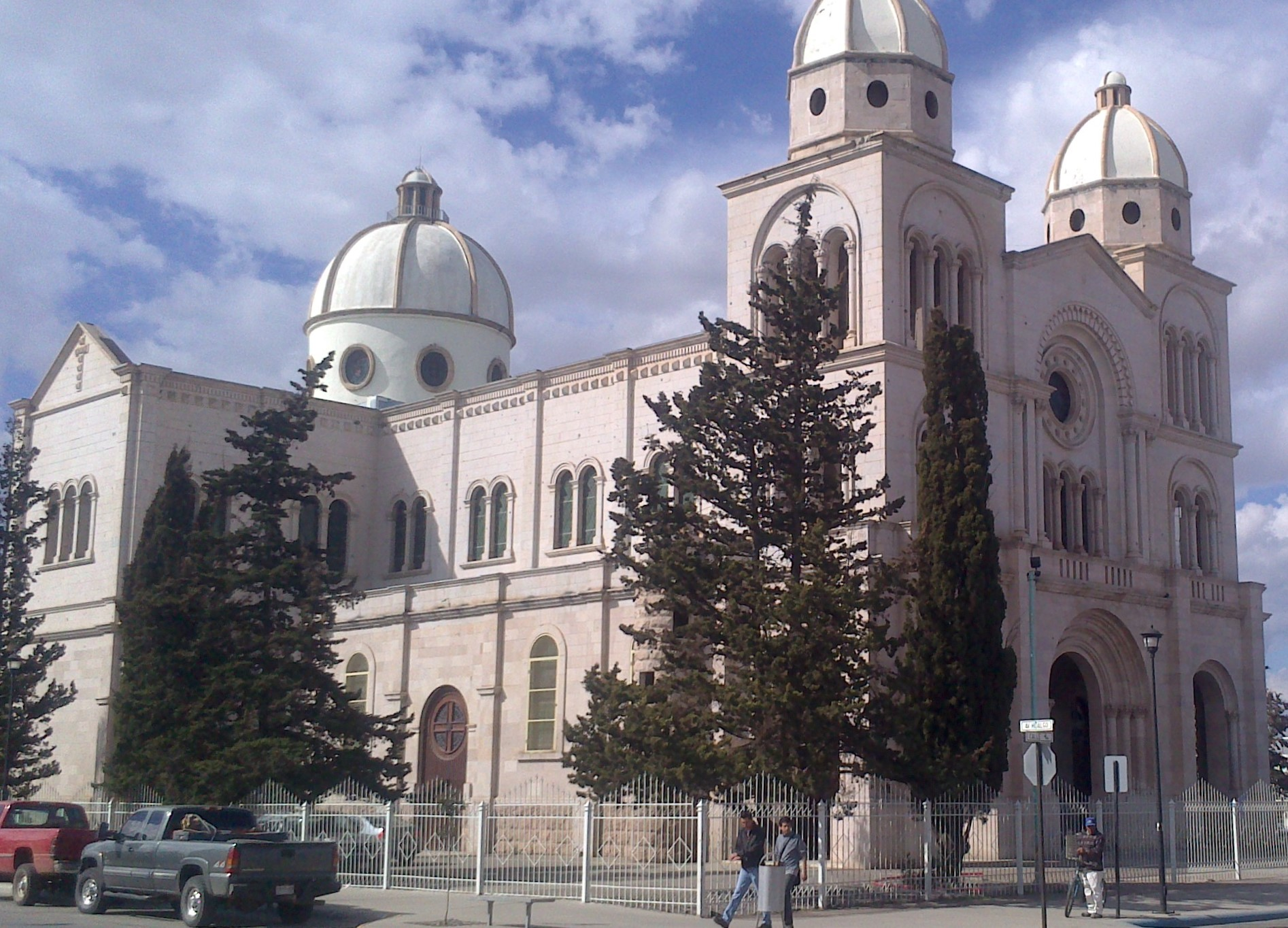
Cuauhtémoc, third largest municipality by population.

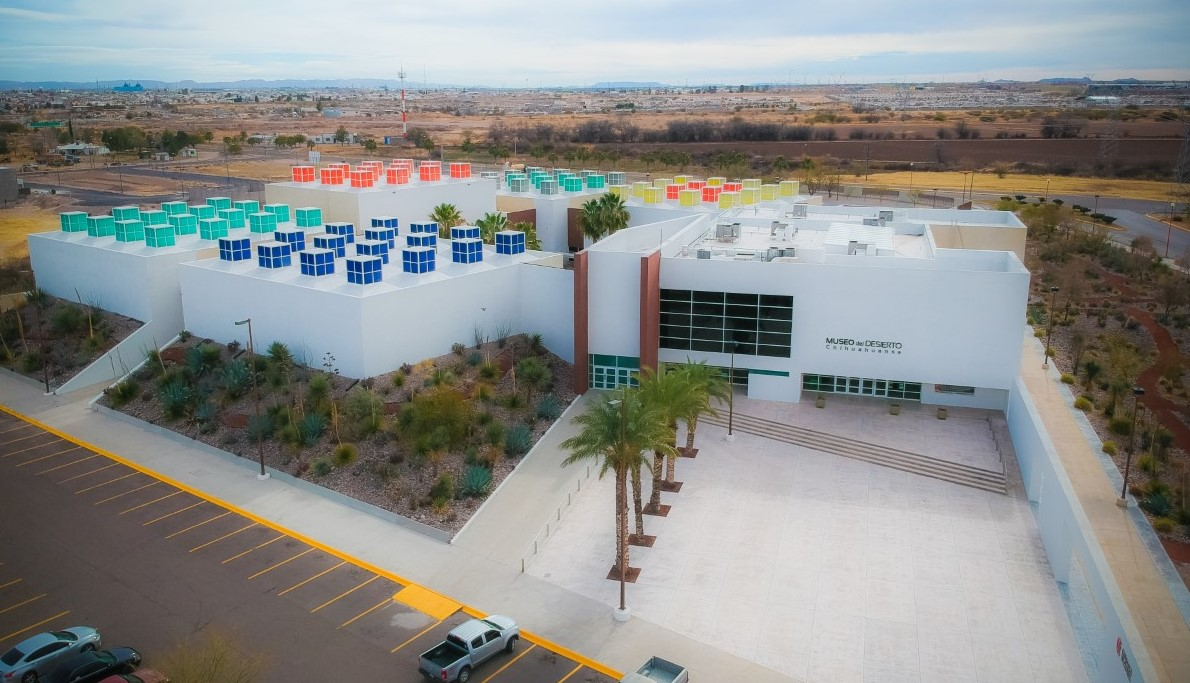
Delicias, fourth largest municipality by population.

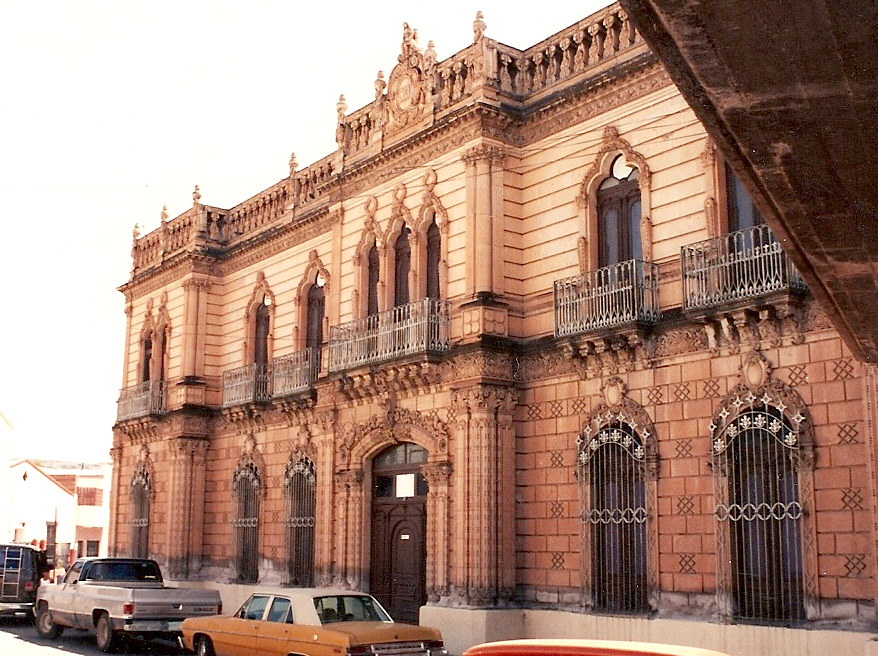
Hidalgo del Parral, fifth largest municipality by population.

† State capital

Municipalities of Chihuahua
Name	Municipal seat	Population (2020)	Population (2010)	Change	Land area		Population density (2020)	Incorporation date
Name	Municipal seat	Population (2020)	Population (2010)	Change	km^{2}	sq mi	Population density (2020)	Incorporation date
Ahumada	Miguel Ahumada	14,635	11,457	+27.7%	16,927.60	6,535.78	0.9/km^{2} (2.2/sq mi)	July 14, 1894
Aldama (Note: Aldama was originally incorporated as San Gerónimo, changing its name on February 16, 1837.)	Juan Aldama	26,047	22,302	+16.8%	9,228.44	3,563.12	2.8/km^{2} (7.3/sq mi)	December 11, 1824
Allende	Valle de Ignacio Allende	8,487	8,409	+0.9%	2,136.76	825.01	4.0/km^{2} (10.3/sq mi)	January 5, 1826
Aquiles Serdán (Note: Aquiles Serdánwas originally incorporated as Santa Eulalia, changing its name on November 17, 1932.)	Santa Eulalia	24,344	10,688	+127.8%	495.82	191.44	49.1/km^{2} (127.2/sq mi)	November 21, 1844
Ascensión	Ascensión	26,093	23,975	+8.8%	12,870.82	4,969.45	2.0/km^{2} (5.3/sq mi)	October 18, 1887
Bachiniva	Bachiniva	5,807	6,011	−3.4%	953.46	368.13	6.1/km^{2} (15.8/sq mi)	November 21, 1844
Balleza (Note: Balleza originally incorporated as San Pablo Tepehuanes, changing its name on February 22, 1859.)	Mariano Balleza	16,440	17,672	−7.0%	5,414.88	2,090.70	3.0/km^{2} (7.9/sq mi)	January 5, 1826
Batopilas	Batopilas	11,270	14,362	−21.5%	2,140.81	826.57	5.3/km^{2} (13.6/sq mi)	January 5, 1826
Bocoyna	Bocoyna	23,351	28,766	−18.8%	2,710.21	1,046.42	8.6/km^{2} (22.3/sq mi)	November 26, 1911
Buenaventura	San Buenaventura	25,146	22,378	+12.4%	7,920.80	3,058.24	3.2/km^{2} (8.2/sq mi)	January 5, 1826
Camargo (Note: Camargo originally incorporated as Santa Rosalía, changing its name on December 3, 1897.)	Santa Rosalía de Camargo	49,499	48,748	+1.5%	13,767.90	5,315.82	3.6/km^{2} (9.3/sq mi)	August 4, 1830
Carichi	Carichi	8,113	8,795	−7.8%	2,594.73	1,001.83	3.1/km^{2} (8.1/sq mi)	November 21, 1844
Casas Grandes	Casas Grandes	11,815	10,587	+11.6%	3,759.17	1,451.42	3.1/km^{2} (8.1/sq mi)	March 17, 1855
Chihuahua†	Chihuahua	937,674	819,543	+14.4%	8,393.34	3,240.69	111.7/km^{2} (289.3/sq mi)	August 7, 1821
Chínipas	Chínipas de Almada	6,222	8,441	−26.3%	1,993.14	769.56	3.1/km^{2} (8.1/sq mi)	November 21, 1844
Coronado	José Esteban Coronado	2,034	2,284	−10.9%	1,893.45	731.07	1.1/km^{2} (2.8/sq mi)	May 10, 1860
Coyame del Sotol	Santiago de Coyame	1,230	1,681	−26.8%	11,664.60	4,503.73	0.1/km^{2} (0.3/sq mi)	November 21, 1844
Cuauhtémoc	Ciudad Cuauhtémoc	180,638	154,639	+16.8%	3,613.21	1,395.07	50.0/km^{2} (129.5/sq mi)	July 23, 1927
Cusihuiriachi	Cusihuiriachi	5,099	5,414	−5.8%	1,610.56	621.84	3.2/km^{2} (8.2/sq mi)	July 19, 1823
Delicias	Delicias	150,506	137,935	+9.1%	533.92	206.15	281.9/km^{2} (730.1/sq mi)	January 12, 1935
Dr. Belisario Domínguez (Note: Dr. Belisario Domínguez originally incorporated as San Lorenzo, changing its name on July 6, 1935.)	San Lorenzo	2,456	2,911	−15.6%	1,034.66	399.48	2.4/km^{2} (6.1/sq mi)	July 19, 1823
El Tule (Note: El Tule was originally incorporated as San Antonio del Tule, changing its name on July 30, 1936.)	El Tule	1,448	1,869	−22.5%	470.50	181.66	3.1/km^{2} (8.0/sq mi)	February 22, 1859
Galeana (Note: Galeana originally incorporated as San Juan Nepomuceno de Galeana, changing its name on February 16, 1837.)	Hermenegildo Galeana	6,656	5,892	+13.0%	1,731.53	668.55	3.8/km^{2} (10.0/sq mi)	September 21, 1829
Gómez Farías	Valentín Gómez Farias	7,023	8,624	−18.6%	854.41	329.89	8.2/km^{2} (21.3/sq mi)	December 15, 1951
Gran Morelos (Note: Gran Morelos originally incorporated as Carretas, changing its name on November 17, 1932.)	San Nicolás de Carretas	2,448	3,209	−23.7%	486.14	187.70	5.0/km^{2} (13.0/sq mi)	July 19, 1823
Guachochi	Guachochi	50,180	49,689	+1.0%	6,984.11	2,696.58	7.2/km^{2} (18.6/sq mi)	January 9, 1963
Guadalupe	Guadalupe	4,237	6,458	−34.4%	6,000.97	2,316.99	0.7/km^{2} (1.8/sq mi)	March 17, 1855
Guadalupe y Calvo	Guadalupe y Calvo	50,514	53,499	−5.6%	9,649.92	3,725.85	5.2/km^{2} (13.6/sq mi)	February 16, 1837
Guazapares	Témoris	8,196	8,998	−8.9%	1,825.89	704.98	4.5/km^{2} (11.6/sq mi)	November 21, 1844
Guerrero (Note: Guerrero originally incorporated as Papigochi, changing its name on January 28, 1869.)	Vicente Guerrero	35,473	39,626	−10.5%	5,737.99	2,215.45	6.2/km^{2} (16.0/sq mi)	January 5, 1826
Hidalgo del Parral (Note: Hidalgo del Parral originally incorporated as El Parral, changing its name on October 18, 1887.)	Hidalgo del Parral	116,662	107,061	+9.0%	1,926.86	743.96	60.5/km^{2} (156.8/sq mi)	August 7, 1821
Huejotitán (Note: Huejotitán originally incorporated as San Gerónimo, changing its name on October 18, 1887.)	Huejotitán	824	1,049	−21.4%	854.34	329.86	1.0/km^{2} (2.5/sq mi)	November 21, 1844
Ignacio Zaragoza	Ignacio Zaragoza	5,196	6,934	−25.1%	2,864.20	1,105.87	1.8/km^{2} (4.7/sq mi)	May 24, 1941
Janos	Janos	11,005	10,953	+0.5%	7,420.46	2,865.06	1.5/km^{2} (3.8/sq mi)	February 16, 1837
Jiménez (Note: Jiménez originally incorporated as Guajoquilla, changing its name on July 19, 1898.)	José Mariano Jiménez	40,859	41,265	−1.0%	10,789.58	4,165.88	3.8/km^{2} (9.8/sq mi)	December 14, 1824
Juárez (Note: Juárez originally incorporated as Paso del Norte, changing its name on July 30, 1888.)	Ciudad Juárez	1,512,450	1,332,131	+13.5%	3,550.43	1,370.83	426.0/km^{2} (1,103.3/sq mi)	January 5, 1826
Julimes	Julimes	4,980	4,953	+0.5%	4,125.54	1,592.88	1.2/km^{2} (3.1/sq mi)	August 28, 1833
La Cruz	La Cruz	3,704	3,982	−7.0%	1,054.64	407.20	3.5/km^{2} (9.1/sq mi)	April 21, 1868
López (Note: López originally incorporated as Atotonilco, changing its name most recently on July 31, 1880.)	Villa López (Octaviano López)	4,122	4,025	+2.4%	1,350.25	521.33	3.1/km^{2} (7.9/sq mi)	November 21, 1844
Madera	Cd. Madera	25,144	29,611	−15.1%	8,748.41	3,377.78	2.9/km^{2} (7.4/sq mi)	July 13, 1911
Maguarichi	Maguarichi	1,302	1,921	−32.2%	1,007.99	389.19	1.3/km^{2} (3.3/sq mi)	November 21, 1844
Manuel Benavides	Manuel Benavides	1,178	1,601	−26.4%	5,032.18	1,942.94	0.2/km^{2} (0.6/sq mi)	December 11, 1937
Matachi	Matachi	2,742	3,104	−11.7%	728.06	281.11	3.8/km^{2} (9.8/sq mi)	November 21, 1844
Matamoros (Note: Matamoros originally incorporated as San Isidro de las Cuevas, changing its name on July 8, 1922.)	Mariano Matamoros	4,314	4,499	−4.1%	1,184.19	457.22	3.6/km^{2} (9.4/sq mi)	July 31, 1874
Meoqui (Note: Meoqui originally incorporated as San Pablo, changing its name on December 11, 1866.)	Pedro Meoqui	44,853	43,833	+2.3%	429.79	165.94	104.4/km^{2} (270.3/sq mi)	August 7, 1821
Morelos	Morelos	7,266	8,343	−12.9%	2,186.92	844.38	3.3/km^{2} (8.6/sq mi)	November 21, 1844
Moris	Moris	4,447	5,312	−16.3%	1,809.77	698.75	2.5/km^{2} (6.4/sq mi)	November 21, 1844
Namiquipa	Namiquipa	22,712	22,880	−0.7%	4,866.13	1,878.82	4.7/km^{2} (12.1/sq mi)	November 21, 1844
Nonoava	Nonoava	2,757	2,849	−3.2%	2,004.15	773.81	1.4/km^{2} (3.6/sq mi)	July 19, 1823
Nuevo Casas Grandes	Nuevo Casas Grandes	65,753	59,337	+10.8%	2,604.83	1,005.73	25.2/km^{2} (65.4/sq mi)	December 21, 1922
Ocampo (Note: Ocampo originally incorporated as Jesús María, changing its name on November 20, 1893.)	Melchor Ocampo	8,127	7,546	+7.7%	1,798.39	694.36	4.5/km^{2} (11.7/sq mi)	February 16, 1837
Ojinaga (Note: Ojinaga originally incorporated as El Norte, changing its name on March 11, 1867)	Ojinaga	24,534	26,304	−6.7%	6,804.43	2,627.21	3.6/km^{2} (9.3/sq mi)	November 21, 1844
Práxedis G. Guerrero (Note: Práxedis G. Guerrero originally incorporated as San Ignacio, changing its name on October 6, 1932.)	Praxedis G. Guerrero	5,111	4,799	+6.5%	371.10	143.28	13.8/km^{2} (35.7/sq mi)	February 22, 1859
Riva Palacio (Note: Riva Palacio originally incorporated as San Andrés, changing its name on October 29, 1932.)	San Andrés	7,695	8,012	−4.0%	2,266.23	875.00	3.4/km^{2} (8.8/sq mi)	March 17, 1855
Rosales (Note: Rosales originally incorporated as Santa Cruz Tapacolmes, changing its name for the most recent time on December 14, 1949.)	Santa Cruz de Rosales	16,776	16,785	−0.1%	1,929.71	745.07	8.7/km^{2} (22.5/sq mi)	July 8, 1820
Rosario	Valle del Rosario	2,079	2,235	−7.0%	1,174.10	453.32	1.8/km^{2} (4.6/sq mi)	November 21, 1844
San Francisco de Borja	San Francisco de Borja	2,197	2,290	−4.1%	1,321.61	510.28	1.7/km^{2} (4.3/sq mi)	July 19, 1823
San Francisco de Conchos	San Francisco de Conchos	2,696	2,983	−9.6%	879.98	339.76	3.1/km^{2} (7.9/sq mi)	November 21, 1844
San Francisco del Oro	San Francisco del Oro	5,004	4,753	+5.3%	480.75	185.62	10.4/km^{2} (27.0/sq mi)	November 21, 1844
Santa Bárbara	Santa Bárbara	11,582	10,427	+11.1%	346.15	133.65	33.5/km^{2} (86.7/sq mi)	July 14, 1829
Santa Isabel	Santa Isabel	3,791	3,937	−3.7%	670.51	258.88	5.7/km^{2} (14.6/sq mi)	July 19, 1823
Satevo	San Francisco Javier de Satevo	3,414	3,662	−6.8%	3,562.15	1,375.35	1.0/km^{2} (2.5/sq mi)	November 21, 1844
Saucillo	Saucillo	29,862	32,325	−7.6%	3,044.34	1,175.43	9.8/km^{2} (25.4/sq mi)	December 2, 1896
Temósachic	Temósachic	5,320	6,211	−14.3%	4,280.77	1,652.81	1.2/km^{2} (3.2/sq mi)	November 21, 1844
Urique	Urique	17,043	20,386	−16.4%	3,307.24	1,276.93	5.2/km^{2} (13.3/sq mi)	December 14, 1860
Uruachi	Uruachi	6,512	8,200	−20.6%	2,663.07	1,028.22	2.4/km^{2} (6.3/sq mi)	November 21, 1844
Valle de Zaragoza (Note: Valle de Zaragoza was originally incorporated as Pilar de Conchos, changing its name on April 28, 1864.)	Valle de Zaragoza	4,775	5,105	−6.5%	2,959.10	1,142.51	1.6/km^{2} (4.2/sq mi)	November 21, 1844
Chihuahua	—	3,741,869	3,406,465	+9.8%	247,798.08	95,675.37	15.1/km^{2} (39.1/sq mi)	—
Mexico	—	126,014,024	112,336,538	+12.2%	1,972,550	761,606	63.9/km^{2} (165.5/sq mi)	—
