= 10th federal electoral district of Chihuahua =

Defunct federal electoral district of Mexico

Coordinates: 28°24′N 106°52′W

The 10th federal electoral district of Chihuahua (Spanish: Distrito electoral federal 10 de Chihuahua) was a federal electoral district of the Mexican state of Chihuahua from 1977 to 1997. During its existence it returned one deputy to the Chamber of Deputies for each of the 51st to 56th sessions of Congress (1979 to 1997). Votes cast in the district also counted towards the calculation of proportional representation ("plurinominal") deputies elected from the country's electoral regions.

The 10th district was created as part of the 1977 political reforms and was first contested in the 1979 mid-term election. It was dissolved by the Federal Electoral Institute (IFE) in its 1996 redistricting process because the state's population no longer warranted ten districts.

It was centred on the city of Ciudad Cuauhtémoc, and covered the municipalities of Cuauhtémoc, Cusihuiriachi, Dr. Belisario Domínguez, Gran Morelos, Guachochi, Nonoava, Riva Palacio, Rosales, Rosario, San Francisco de Borja, San Francisco de Conchos, Satevó and Valle de Zaragoza.

== Deputies returned to Congress ==
(Mexico) National parties
- Current
- PAN
- PRI
- PT
- PVEM
- MC
- Morena
- Defunct or local only
- PLM
- PNR
- PRM
- PNM
- PP
- PPS
- PARM
- PFCRN
- Convergencia
- PANAL
- PSD
- PES
- PES
- PRD

Chihuahua's 10th district
Election	Deputy	Party	Term	Legislature
1979	Alfonso Jesús Armendáriz Durán	Institutional Revolutionary Party	1979–1982	51st Congress
1982	Miguel Ángel Olea Enríquez	Institutional Revolutionary Party	1982–1985	52nd Congress
1985	José Bernardo Ruiz Ceballos	Institutional Revolutionary Party	1985–1988	53rd Congress
1988	Artemio Iglesias Miramontes	Institutional Revolutionary Party	1988–1991	54th Congress
1991	Israel Beltrán Montes	Institutional Revolutionary Party	1991–1994	55th Congress
1994	Jorge Castillo Cabrera	Institutional Revolutionary Party	1994–1997	56th Congress

=== Congressional results ===
The corresponding page on the Spanish-language Wikipedia contains full electoral results from 1979 to 1994.
