= Salvador Alcántar Ortega =

Salvador Alcántar Ortega (born 18 August 1954) is a Mexican politician.

Alcántar was seated in the Chamber of Deputies on 25 May 2022, serving in the 65th session of Congress. He represented the fifth federal electoral district of Chihuahua on behalf of the National Action Party (PAN), as the alternate of Mario Mata Carrasco. Alcántar previously served as the municipal president of La Cruz, Chihuahua, in the late 1980s.
