= Delicias Municipality =

Municipality in the Mexican state of Chihuahua

Delicias
- Municipality
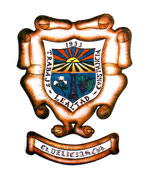
- Coat of arms

- Municipality of Delicias in Chihuahua

- Location in Mexico
- Coordinates: 28°11′N 105°28′W
- Country: Mexico
- State: Chihuahua
- Municipal seat: Delicias

Area
  - Total: 335.4 km^{2} (129.5 sq mi)

Population (2010)
  - Total: 137,935

Delicias is one of the 67 municipalities of Chihuahua, in northern Mexico. The capital lies at Delicias. The municipality covers an area of 335.4 km^{2}.

As of 2010, the municipality had a total population of 137,935, up from 127,211 as of 2005.

As of 2010, the city of Delicias had a population of 118,071. Other than the city of Delicias, the municipality had 687 localities, the largest of which (with 2010 populations in parentheses) were: Colonia Revolución (3,995), Miguel Hidalgo (2,850), classified as urban; and Colonia Campesina (2,365), Colonia Nicolás Bravo (Kilómetro Noventa y Dos) (1,772), Colonia Terrazas (1,602), and Colonia Abraham González (La Quemada) (1,404), classified as rural.

== Politics ==
=== Municipal presidents ===
- (1974 - 1976): Fernando Baeza Meléndez
- (1976 - 1977): Salvador Montelongo
- (1977 - 1980): Carlos Manuel Carrasco Chacón
- (1980 - 1983): Lorenzo Treviño de los Santos
- (1983 - 1986): Horacio González de las Casas
- (1986): Gabriel Baeza Vitolás
- (1986 - 1989): Jaime Ríos Velasco
- (1989 - 1990): Oscar Villalobos Chávez
- (1990 - 1992): Gloria Cervantes
- (1992 - 1995): Rogelio Bejarano
- (1995 - 1998): Rogelio Muñoz
- (1998 - 2001): Manuel Soltero Delgado
- (2001 - 2004): Héctor Baeza Terrazas
- (2004 - 2007): Guillermo Márquez Lizalde
- (2007 - 2010): Jesús Heberto Villalobos Maynez
