= Israel Beltrán Montes =

Mexican businessman and politician (1947–2022)

- Born: 29 March 1947; Chihuahua, Mexico
- Died: 2 March 2022 (aged 74); Chihuahua City, Chihuahua, Mexico
- Occupations: Businessman and politician
- Political party: PRI

Israel Beltrán Montes (29 March 1947 – 2 March 2022) was a Mexican businessman and politician affiliated with the Institutional Revolutionary Party (PRI). He served as Deputy of the LV and LX Legislatures of the Mexican Congress representing Chihuahua and also spent two terms as municipal president of Ciudad Cuauhtémoc.

== Life and career ==
Beltrán Montes was born in 1947 and studied to become a teacher from 1963 to 1966.

Beltrán Montes first made his appearance in the PRI in the 1970s, serving for nearly a decade as secretary of the Municipal Directive Committee (CDM) of the PRI in Chihuahua. After a decade away from politics, he became the head of the CDM in 1990. The next year, he was sent to the LV Legislature as a federal deputy from the now-defunct tenth district. After his term ended in 1994, Beltrán Montes founded Grupo BM Radio, beginning with station XEDP in Ciudad Cuauhtémoc. BM Radio later grew to own or operate thirteen stations, all in Chihuahua; Beltrán Montes hosted the weekly program "Cuestión de Minutos", which originated in Cuauhtémoc and was carried on all of the BM stations.

In 1998, Beltrán Montes was elected to the LIX Legislature of Chihuahua and chaired its board of directors. After his term in the state legislature, he ran for and won election to the municipal presidency of Cuauhtémoc, and when that three-year term ended, he served in further party positions in the PRI. He was the state coordinator for social communication in the run-up to the 2006 presidential elections and a national councilmember. In 2006, he ran for the PRI to return to San Lázaro, winning election as the deputy representing Chihuahua's seventh district. While in the LX Legislature, he served on five committees including Rural Development, National Defense and Radio, Television and Film.

He returned to the municipal presidency of Ciudad Cuauhtémoc when he was elected for a new three-year term in 2010.

Beltrán Montes died from complications of COVID-19 in Chihuahua City on 2 March 2022, at the age of 74. It was reported that he had contracted COVID-19 at the end of 2021, causing respiratory complications that led to his death.
