= Tony Meléndez (Mexican singer) =

Mexican politician

Juan Antonio Meléndez Ortega (born 7 April 1971), better known as Tony Meléndez, is a Mexican singer and politician. He is best known as the lead vocalist of the regional Mexican band Conjunto Primavera.

Meléndez joined Conjunto Primavera in 1989, following the departure of their previous lead vocalist, Nacho Galindo. Meléndez is famous for his tenor singing voice which has helped the band land numerous hits in the regional Mexican charts in the United States and Mexico.

Meléndez Ortega served in the Chamber of Deputies from 29 May 2015 to 31 August 2018, serving in the 63rd Congress. He represented the fifth federal electoral district of Chihuahua on behalf of the Institutional Revolutionary Party (PRI), succeeding Abraham Montes Alvarado. He was replaced by Mario Mata Carrasco.

He was re-elected to the same seat in the 2024 general election.
