= Jorge Rojas =

Jorge Rojas may refer to:

- Jorge Rojas (poet) (1911–1995), Colombian poet, member of the Stone and Sky movement
- Jorge A. Rojas (born 1940), Mexican leader in the Church of Jesus Christ of Latter-day Saints
- Jorge Rojas Ávila (born 1953), Chilean Air Force fighter pilot, commander-in-chief
- Jorge Rojas (politician) (born c. 1958), Colombian diplomat and politician
- Jorge Rojas (Venezuelan footballer) (born 1977), Venezuelan footballer
- Jorge Rojas (Spanish footballer) (born 1983), Spanish footballer
- Jorge Rojas (Paraguayan footballer) (born 1993), Paraguayan footballer
- Jorge Rojas (Bolivian footballer) (born 1993), Bolivian footballer
