= Ciudad Camargo =

Ciudad Camargo may refer to:

- Camargo, Chihuahua, Mexico
- Camargo Municipality, Tamaulipas, Mexico
