= Felipe González Ruiz =

Mexican politician

- Born: 26 May 1958 (age 67); San Luis Potosí, Mexico
- Occupation: Politician
- Political party: PAN
- Spouse: Lucía del Carmen Cuello Garza
- Children: Felipe González Cuello & Emilio Gonzalez Cuello

Felipe González Ruiz (born 26 May 1958) is a Mexican politician affiliated with the National Action Party (PAN). In the 2006 general election he was elected to the Chamber of Deputies to represent the fifth district of Chihuahua during the 60th Congress.
