= San Francisco de Conchos Municipality =

Municipality in the Mexican state of Chihuahua

San Francisco de Conchos
- Municipality
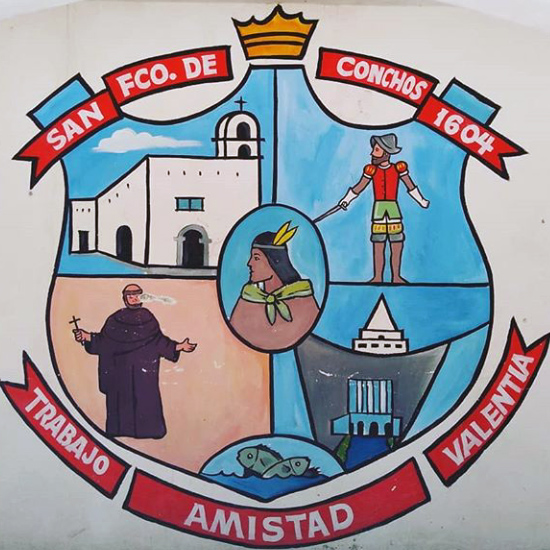
- Coat of arms

- Municipality of San Francisco de Conchos in Chihuahua
- Coordinates: 27°35′18″N 105°20′03″W
- Country: Mexico
- State: Chihuahua
- Municipal seat: San Francisco de Conchos
- Municipality created: 1825; 201 years ago

Government
  - Mayor: Norma Pavia 2024-2027

Area
  - Total: 1,169.1 km^{2} (451.4 sq mi)

Population (2020)
  - Total: 2,696
  - Density: 2.306/km^{2} (5.973/sq mi)
- Time zone: UTC−6 (CST)
- Postal code: 33680 - 33695
- Area code: 648
- Website: http://sanfranciscodeconchos.gob.mx/

San Francisco de Conchos is one of the 67 municipalities of Chihuahua, in northern Mexico. The municipal seat lies at San Francisco de Conchos. The municipality covers an area of 1,169.1 km^{2}.

As of 2010, the municipality had a total population of 2,983, up from 2,669 as of 2005.

As of 2010, the town of San Francisco de Conchos had a population of 644. Other than the town of San Francisco de Conchos, the municipality had 93 localities, the largest of which (with 2010 population in parentheses) was: Boquilla de Babisas (La Boquilla de Conchos) (1,185).

== History ==
Since the beginning of the eighteenth century, the Franciscans occupied the region and evangelized indigenous tribes of the Conchos.

A Franciscan Mission, named San Francisco de Coyamus, was established in the banks of the Rio Conchos in 1604 by Padre Alonso de la Oliva.

In 1645, the mission was destroyed by the local Conchos Indians; they drove away the Spanish settlers and killed the missionaries Thomas & Zigarán and Francisco Labado.

In 1677, the settlement was re-established and repopulated by Sierra Lopez y Osorio, governor of Nueva Vizcaya, with the new name of San Francisco de Cochos.

In 1687, a military Presidio was also established. When the Presidio was created, the seat was changed from the mission to the people who called Guadalupe, where today the population rises.

The settlement was incorporated in 1820, after the adoption of the Constitution of Cadiz, and the first local council was elected. The town became part of the Party of Allende (1826); Deputy Chief of Jimenez (1837); and Canton Jimenez (1847).

== Coat of arms ==
The official seal of the municipality was designed by Mr. Manuel Vazquez Carrasco

The coats of arms that are within the stylized field are:

- Spanish.- It refers to the time of the founding of the population in the year 1604 by Fray Alonso de la Oliva.
- Church.- It means the time of the colony when it was destroyed.
- The Indio. Represents the three tribes, Apaches, Comanches and conchos, that natural resources were played, as the Conchos River; They predominated in this area Conchos Indians.
- The missionary.- It symbolizes the Franciscan missionaries who founded this town and made evangelizers of the Indians.
- The dam. It means the Toronto Lake is within the municipality.
- Fish. An important natural resource of the municipality.
- Corn and wheat. Main products of the region.

== Geography ==
The municipality of San Francisco de Conchos is in the southern state of Chihuahua in the region of the Conchos River, its boundaries are the north with the municipality of Saucillo, northeast in the municipality of La Cruz, east to the town of Camargo the south with the municipality of Allende and the west with the municipality of Valle de Zaragoza; It has a land area of 1,169.10 square kilometers.

The municipality is in the plateau region, so that its territory is mostly flat, interrupted by some low hills that cross the plains, the main of these mountains are the local names of La Boquilla, La Colina and Pajaritos.

The main current of the municipality is Conchos River, the largest in the state of Chihuahua, which crosses the city from west to east, in the exact boundary of San Francisco de Conchos with the municipality of Valle de Zaragoza curtain Dam is located La Boquilla dam, the largest dam of the state of Chihuahua, in the center of the municipality is another dam that forms Colina Lake which is a spa; whole municipality belongs to hydrologic Region Bravo-Conchos and two different basins, the western area Conchos River - Colina dam and the eastern sector Conchos River - El Granero dam.

=== Flora ===
It is predominantly a desert of scrub and grassland. Among the species that stand out are the creosote, gobernadora or hediondilla and hojasen or weed rubber, which is a characteristic species and is found more dispersed, but can cover large areas under certain conditions and soil moisture. Other common plants in the northern part of the territory include shrubs such as shack or rib cow, mariola or guayule, and the sweet mesquite. Similarly there are succulents, cacti and some small to medium, such as the cholla, palmitas or yuccas, agaves and such as lechuguilla, characteristic of this desert. Grassland plants are also common, like the black penknife and common toboso or cookie grass. Other common plants are the ocotillo, sotol, khella water or barrel cactus, and peyote.

=== Fauna ===
Some typical animals of this village are desert rabbit, hare California, cactus mouse, the swift fox, the coffee or desert wren, Northern roadrunner, the Mojave rattlesnake, the Chirrionera snake, the huico New Mexico or whiptail lizard, the spotted toad, the tiger salamander, Rat timber, the pallid bat, the coyote, the Mexican gray wolf, hooded skunk, the Wildcat, mule deer and the puma concolor.

== Farming ==
It is the main economic activity in the region and mainly products such as jalapeño, alfalfa, beans, corn grain, grass, grain sorghum, red tomato, green tomato and wheat grain sown. Also it has an important nut production.

== Tourism ==
Tourism is the second most important economic activity for the city and state is the second destination during summer vacation. To contain the largest body of water in the state La Boquilla Dam and below this a small dam called Colina Lake, these waters are used for water sports activities (like boat rides and jet skis, skiing and fishing) and not forgetting the famous spas Los Filtros for its spring waters.

The church of San Francisco de Asis is located in the municipal head is the most important monument of the town since its construction dates from 1710 and is still standing, the remains of the Temple of Guadalupe (located in the municipal cemetery before military prison) and the aqueduct are other important buildings of the colonial era.

== Demography ==
According to the Census of Population and House 2020 conducted by the National Institute of Statistics and Geography (INEGI), the population of the municipality of San Francisco de Conchos it is of 2,696 inhabitants, of whom 1,401 are men and 1,295 are women.

=== Locations ===
The municipality has a total of 68 localities. The main localities and their population are as follows:

| Location | Population (2020) |
| Boquilla de Conchos | 1,016 |
| San Francisco de Conchos | 576 |
| Rancho Nuevo | 216 |
| El Molino | 163 |
| La Nata | 80 |
| Amparaneño | 70 |
| Others | 575 |
| Total | 2,696 |

== Politics ==
San Francisco de Conchos is one of 67 municipalities that make up the state of Chihuahua, the government of the municipality corresponds to City Hall, which is composed of the Mayor and the council made up of the rulers. The H. City Council is elected for a period of three years are not eligible for reappointment for immediate but not continuous period.

=== Mayors ===
The following table is to list the mayors and period:

| Mayor | Period | Party |
|---|---|---|
| Benedicto Fierro Fierro | 1890 | |
| Susano Gardea Valles | 1898-1901 | |
| Moises Fierro Fierro | 1903-1906 | |
| Eugenio Anaya Sagaribay | 1926-1929 | |
| David Arellano Fierro | 1934 | |
| Antonio Villa Rey | 1934-1935 | |
| Jose Trinidad Escobar Muñoz | 1936-1937 | |
| Antonio Villa Rey | 1938-1939 | |
| Jose Fierro Peña | 1941-1944 | |
| Concepcion Hidalgo Pavia | 1947-1950 | Institutional Revolutionary Party |
| Valente Pavia Duran | 1953-1956 | Institutional Revolutionary Party |
| Tomas Anaya Aguilar | 1956-1959 | Institutional Revolutionary Party |
| Agustin Fierro Carrasco | 1959-1962 | Institutional Revolutionary Party |
| Aurelio Carrillo Aguilar | 1962-1965 | Institutional Revolutionary Party |
| Jose Trinidad Escobar | 1965-1968 | Institutional Revolutionary Party |
| Doroteo Silva Holguin | 1968-1971 | Institutional Revolutionary Party |
| Saturnino Ramirez Saenz | 1971-1974 | Popular Socialist Party (Mexico) |
| Daniel Pavia Yañez | 1974-1975 | Institutional Revolutionary Party |
| Demetrio Caro Leyva | 1976-1977 | Institutional Revolutionary Party |
| Isidoro Molina Fernandez | 1977-1980 | Institutional Revolutionary Party |
| Jose Trinidad Escobar | 1980-1983 | Institutional Revolutionary Party |
| Juan Nuñez Morales | 1983-1986 | Institutional Revolutionary Party |
| Francisco Armando Hidalgo Aguilar | 1986-1989 | Institutional Revolutionary Party |
| Tomas Roberto Anaya Bustillos | 1989 | Institutional Revolutionary Party |
| Juan Nuñez Morales | 1989-1992 | Institutional Revolutionary Party |
| Xochilt Hermosillo Villegas | 1992-1995 | Institutional Revolutionary Party |
| Tomas Roberto Anaya Bustillos | 1995-1998 | Institutional Revolutionary Party |
| Guadalupe Valles Prieto | 1998-2001 | National Action Party (Mexico) |
| Guillermo Carrillo Saenz | 2001-2004 | Institutional Revolutionary Party |
| Francisco Caro Velo | 2004-2007 | Institutional Revolutionary Party |
| Francisco Armando Hidalgo Aguilar | 2007-2010 | Institutional Revolutionary Party |
| Francisco Javier Silva Pavia | 2010-2013 | Institutional Revolutionary Party |
| Eleazar Valles Villa | 2013-2016 | National Action Party (Mexico) |
| Guadalupe Izay Valles Villa | 2016-2018 | National Action Party (Mexico) |
| Cosme Hidalgo Acosta | 2018 | National Action Party (Mexico) |
| Jaime Ramirez Carrasco | 2018-2021 | Institutional Revolutionary Party |
| Jaime Ramirez Carrasco | 2021-2024 | Institutional Revolutionary Party |
| Norma Graciela Pavia Manriquez | 2024-2027 | Institutional Revolutionary Party |

=== Legislative representation ===
For the election of Deputies to Congress of Chihuahua and to General Congress, the municipality of San Francisco de Conchos is composed as follows:

Local:

- XV Local Electoral District of Chihuahua with seat at Camargo.

Federal

- V Federal Electoral District of Chihuahua with seat at Delicias.

== Notable people ==
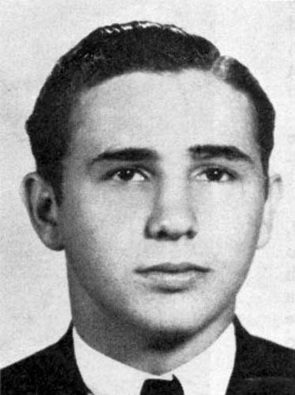
Eugenio Anaya Sagaribay (Founder of ejido de San Francisco de Conchos)

- Eugenio Anaya Sagaribay
- Prof. Maximino Gonzalez Carrasco (Historian)

== Religion ==
The population is predominantly Catholic, with a growing number of evangelical Christians (Protestants): Pentecostals, Baptists, Presbyterians and Methodists.

Also about 2 percent belong to other Christian groups (Jehovah's Witnesses, Mormons, Oneness Pentecostal).
