= Martha Ramirez-Oropeza =

Mexican artist, researcher (born 1952)

Martha Ramirez–Oropeza (born 1952) is a Mexican muralist, painter, theater performer, and researcher known for her work on the pre-Hispanic Nahuatl culture.

== Early life and education ==
Martha Ramirez-Oropeza was born in Delicias, Chihuahua, Mexico and her parents were migrant farmworkers. Due to this, she continuously traveled from Delicias to Colusa, California. She worked with her family in the fields picking prunes at a young age. Her family eventually settled down in Pacoima which is a neighborhood in Los Angeles. She experienced discrimination by a teacher that washed her mouth with soap after speaking Spanish when she was in second grade. These experiences then lead her to partake in the Chicano Movement, a hunger strike for the United Farmworkers Union, creating anti-war posters, and planning and paintings murals.

Ramirez-Oropeza pursued an education at California State University, Northridge. She received her Bachelor of Art degree from Antioch University in 2008.

== Career ==
Ramirez-Oropeza co-founded the Universidad Nahuatl De Ocotepec, located in Ocotepec, Cuernavaca, Morelos, Mexico. One motivation to co-found this university was resistance to the discrimination she and many have experienced. She has been a coordinator for the university and was a professor teaching Nahuatl philosophy for 13 years. Her scholarly work and art continued in California at the University of California, Los Angeles (UCLA) and Social and Public Art Resource Center. At UCLA, Ramirez-Oropeza teaches courses in Chicano/a Studies and Art.

She is considered an expert on the Day of the Dead ritual because she has dedicated many years to research about it, despite not growing up with the tradition. At SPARC, she is an Artist in Residence, and she partners with SPARC to lead the Day of the Dead Ritual yearly.

She is also a performing arts teacher at Edison Language Elementary.

== Art and exhibitions ==
Ramirez-Oropeza began drawing and creating art at a young age to escape her reality. At the age of 18, she made the decision to move back to Mexico and develop her art. In Mexico, she developed her skills under the guidance of muralist David Alfaro Siquieros. In this apprenticeship, she collaborated with him on the mural Patricios y Patricidas. Ramirez-Oropeza has also collaborated with Chicana muralist Judith Baca in a project titled The World Wall.

Ramirez-Oropeza has painted a variety of murals in both the United States and Mexico. In 2004, she was a recipient of an Award that was funded by the Durfee Foundation.

- "Atzalan-Topialitzi" Mural at the University of Oregon
  - Martha painted the mural in 1989 after being reached out by MEChA members from the University of Oregon. The purpose of the mural was to preserve the Chicano Movement history. Martha includes the history of Aztecs, Mestizos, and Chicanos to remind people about the roots of Chicanos.
- "Together Through Two Languages" Mural at Edison Language Academy in Santa Monica, California.
- "Holding on to our Roots" Painting.
- "Tlazolteotl: Creative Force of the Un-Woven" Mural by Martha Ramirez-Oropeza & Patricia Quijano. The mural was part of "The World Wall: A Vision of the World Without Fear" event in Mexico.
  - Martha Ramirez-Oropeza collaborated with Patricia Quijano on this mural which was part of an event that Judith Baca invited them to, organized by SPARC. This exhibit is a travel installation mural and both artists painted the mural in 1999, but it was revealed in 2001. The inspiration for the mural was mother earth, because she regenerates and heals everything and everyone. Both artists wrote a poem after finishing the mural that reflected their feelings about it.
