= Juan Aldama, Chihuahua =

City in the Mexican state of Chihuahua

Aldama
- City
- Location in Mexico
- Coordinates: 28°50′19″N 105°54′40″W
- Country: Mexico
- State: Chihuahua
- Municipality: Aldama

Population (2020)
  - Total: 22,568
- Climate: BSh

Aldama is a city and seat of the municipality of Aldama in the northern Mexican state of Chihuahua. As of 2020, the city had a population of 22,568 inhabitants.

== History ==
The city of Aldama dates from August 7, 1671, when Captain Pedro Cano de los Ríos established two sites for cattle raising. By 1717, the Franciscan friars established a mission called San Jerónimo there, to evangelize the local natives, known as conchos and chinarras.

== Economy ==
Agriculture is the city's main economic activity. Commerce now plays an important role, offering products to residents and to people in transit between Chihuahua and Ojinaga. Many residents travel to Chihuahua city to work or study.

== Infrastructure ==
=== Transportation ===

Mexican Federal Highway 16 is the main road through Aldama. It crosses Aldama from east to west, connecting it with Chihuahua, Coyame, and Ojinaga, a port of entry to the U.S. state of Texas. The segment between Aldama and Chihuahua is a toll-free four-lane highway.

=== Education ===
Aldama has public kindergarten, elementary schools, and middle schools provided by the federal government and state government. Students usually travel to the city of Chihuahua to continue with their university studies.
