= Coyame del Sotol Municipality =

Municipality in the Mexican state of Chihuahua

Coyame del Sotol
- Municipality
- Municipality of Coyame del Sotol in Chihuahua
- Coordinates: 29°27′41″N 105°05′50″W
- Country: Mexico
- State: Chihuahua
- Founded: 1844
- Seat: Coyame

Area
  - Total: 7,877 km^{2} (3,041 sq mi)
- Elevation: 1,220 m (4,000 ft)

Population (2010)
  - Total: 1,681

Coyame del Sotol is one of the 67 municipalities of Chihuahua, in northern Mexico. The municipal seat is Coyame. The municipality covers an area of 7,877 km^{2} (3,041 sq mi).

As of the 2010 census, the municipality had a total population of 1,681.

The municipality had 232 localities, none of which had a population over 1,000.

== Name ==
"Coyame" is the Apache toponym of a nearby arroyo. "Sotol" is the local name for Dasylirion wheeleri, a flowering desert plant, and for sotol, a distilled mezcal-like spirit made from it.

== Geography ==
=== Towns and villages ===
The municipality has 46 localities. These are the largest:

Village	2010 census population
Total municipality	1,681
Coyame	709
San Pedro	235
La Paz de México	184
Cuchillo Parado	124

== Adjacent municipalities ==
- Ojinaga Municipality – east
- Aldama Municipality – south, southwest
- Ahumada Municipality – northwest
- Guadalupe Municipality – north
