= Velia Aguilar Armendáriz =

Mexican politician

- Born: 6 February 1960 (age 66); Ciudad Camargo, Chihuahua, Mexico
- Occupation: Politician
- Political party: PAN

Velia Idalia Aguilar Armendáriz (born 6 February 1960) is a Mexican politician from the National Action Party. From 2009 to 2012 she served as Deputy of the LXI Legislature of the Mexican Congress representing National Action Party.
