= Guillermo Márquez Lizalde =

Mexican politician

- Born: 25 June 1961 (age 65); Delicias, Chihuahua, Mexico
- Occupation: Politician
- Political party: PRI

Manuel Guillermo Márquez Lizalde (born 25 June 1961) is a Mexican politician from the Institutional Revolutionary Party (PRI). In the 2009 mid-terms he was elected to the Chamber of Deputies to represent the fifth district of Chihuahua during the 61st Congress.
