= Manuel Benavides Municipality =

Municipality in the Mexican state of Chihuahua

Manuel Benavides
- Municipality
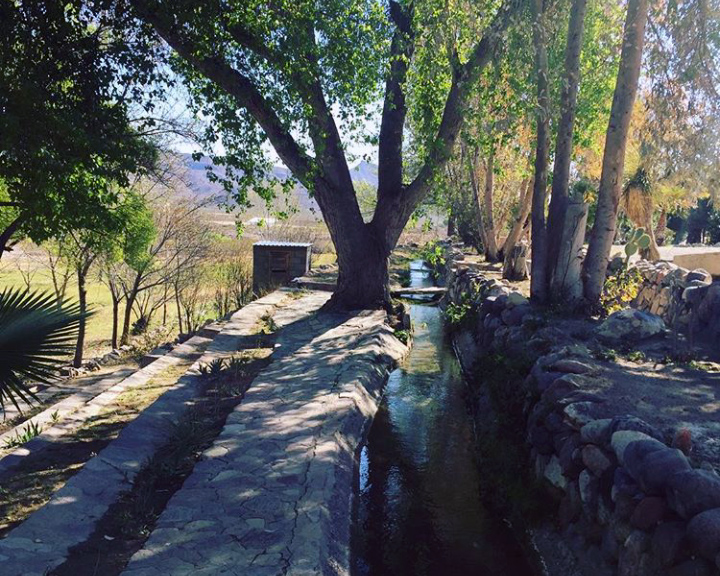

- Municipality of Manuel Benavides in Chihuahua

- Location in Mexico
- Coordinates: 29°06′26″N 103°54′23″W
- Country: Mexico
- State: Chihuahua
- Municipal seat: Manuel Benavides

Area
  - Total: 3,191.5 km^{2} (1,232.2 sq mi)

Population (2020)
  - Total: 1,178
  - Density: 0.3691/km^{2} (0.9560/sq mi)

Manuel Benavides is one of the 67 municipalities of Chihuahua, in northern Mexico. The municipal seat is in the town of Manuel Benavides. The municipality covers an area of 3,191.5 km^{2}.

At the 2020 census, the municipality had a total population of 1,178, a decrease of -26.4% since 2010.

The municipality had 183 localities as of 2010, none of which had a population over 1,000.

== Geography ==
=== Towns and villages ===
The 2020 census recorded population data for 76 localities, the biggest of which were:

Name	2020 Census Population
Manuel Benavides	778
Paso de San Antonio (La Hacienda)	72
Álamos de San Antonio	57
Nuevo Lajitas	26
El Tubo	20
Total Municipality	1,178

=== Adjacent municipalities and counties ===
- Ocampo Municipality, Coahuila – southeast-east
- Camargo Municipality – south
- Ojinaga Municipality – west
- Presidio County, Texas – north
- Brewster County, Texas – northeast
