= Jorge Castillo Cabrera =

Mexican politician

- Born: 15 September 1946 (age 79); Atlixco, Puebla, Mexico
- Occupation: Politician
- Political party: PRI

Jorge de Jesús Castillo Cabrera (born 15 September 1946) is a Mexican politician affiliated with the Institutional Revolutionary Party (PRI).

He has served in the Chamber of Deputies on two occasions: from 1994 to 1997 (56th Congress) for Chihuahua's tenth district, and from 2003 to 2006 (59th Congress) for Chihuahua's seventh district.
