= Fernando Álvarez Monje =

Mexican politician

- Born: 4 February 1968 (age 58); Chihuahua, Mexico
- Occupations: Lawyer and politician
- Political party: PAN

Fernando Álvarez Monje (born 4 February 1968) is a Mexican politician affiliated with the National Action Party (PAN). In the 2003 mid-terms he was elected to the Chamber of Deputies to represent the fifth district of Chihuahua during the 59th Congress.
