= San Francisco del Oro Municipality =

Municipality in the Mexican state of Chihuahua

San Francisco del Oro
- Municipality
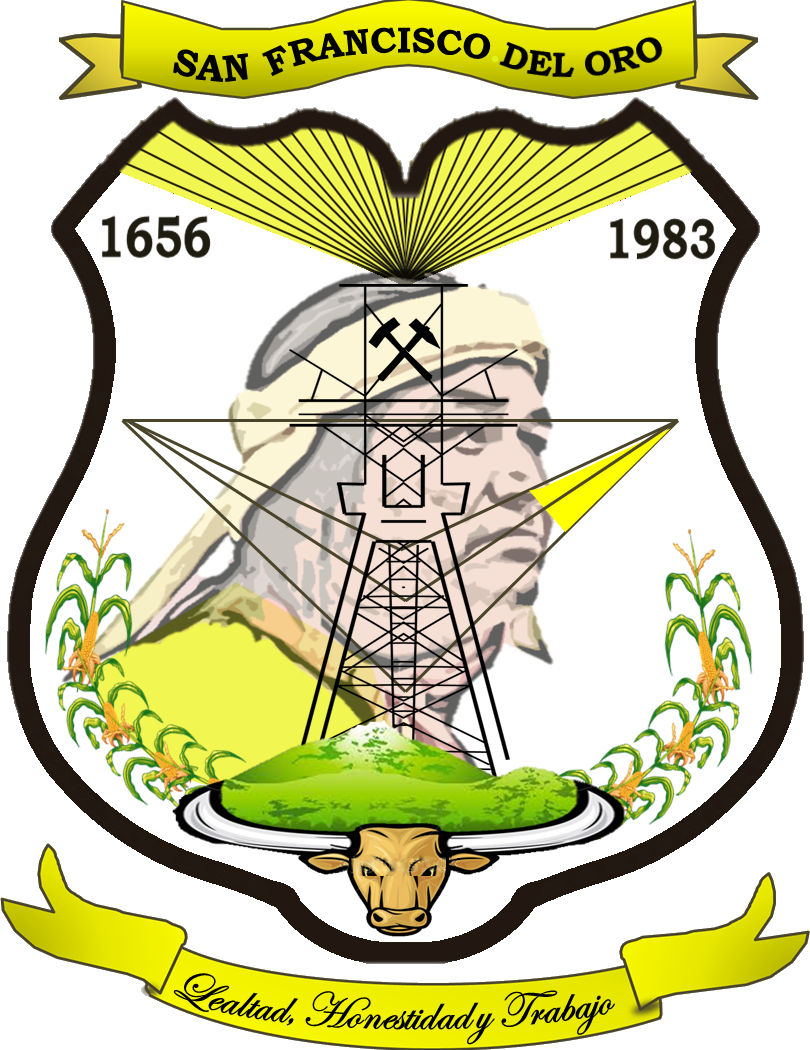
- Coat of arms

- Municipality of San Francisco del Oro in Chihuahua

- Location in Mexico
- Coordinates: 26°51′33″N 105°50′51″W
- Country: Mexico
- State: Chihuahua
- Municipal seat: San Francisco del Oro

Area
  - Total: 695.5 km^{2} (268.5 sq mi)

Population (2010)
  - Total: 4,753
  - Density: 6.834/km^{2} (17.70/sq mi)

San Francisco del Oro is one of the 67 municipalities of Chihuahua in northern Mexico. The municipal seat lies at San Francisco del Oro. The municipality, one of the smallest in Chihuahua, covers an area of 695.5 km^{2}.

== Demography ==
As of 2010, the municipality had a total population of 4,753, which is a decrease from the 2005 population of 4,838.

As of 2010, the municipality of San Francisco del Oro had a population of 4,249. The municipality has 97 localities, none of which has a population over 1,000.
