= Horacio González de las Casas =

Mexican politician (1942–2025)

Member of the Chamber of Deputies of Mexico
- In office 1 September 1988 – 31 August 1991

Personal details
- Born: 20 April 1942; Chihuahua City, Chihuahua, Mexico
- Died: 10 January 2025 (aged 82); Delicias, Chihuahua, Mexico
- Political party: PAN
- Occupation: Agronomist

Horacio González de las Casas (20 April 1942 – 10 January 2025) was a Mexican politician. A member of the National Action Party, he served in the Chamber of Deputies as a plurinominal deputy from 1988 to 1991.

González died in Delicias on 10 January 2025, at the age of 82.
