= La Cruz, Chihuahua =

Town in the Mexican state of Chihuahua

La Cruz
- Town
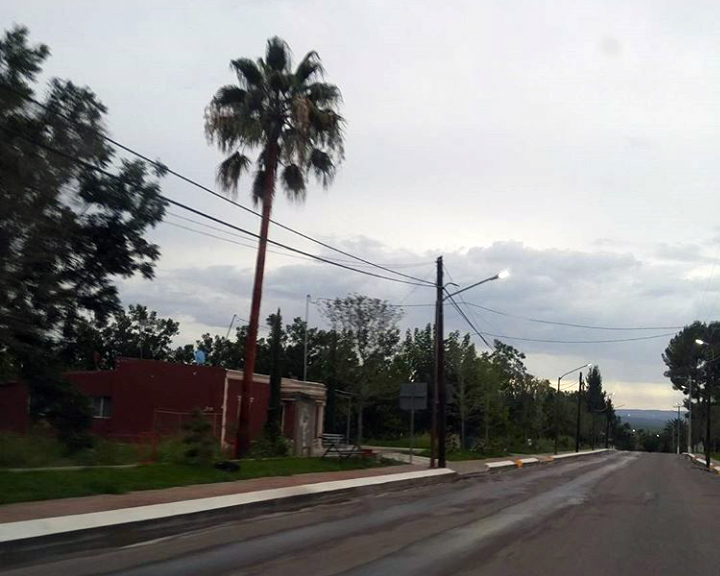

- Location in Mexico
- Coordinates: 26°52′N 105°13′W
- Country: Mexico
- State: Chihuahua
- Municipality: La Cruz

Population (2010)
  - Total: 1,671

La Cruz is a town and seat of the municipality of La Cruz, in the northern Mexican state of Chihuahua. As of 2010, the population of 1,671 is up from 1,318 in 2005.
