= Abraham Montes Alvarado =

Mexican politician

- Born: 16 March 1961 (age 65); Chihuahua, Mexico
- Occupation: Deputy
- Political party: PRI

Abraham Montes Alvarado (born 16 March 1961) is a Mexican politician affiliated with the Institutional Revolutionary Party (PRI). In the 2012 general election he was elected to the Chamber of Deputies to represent the fifth district of Chihuahua during the 62nd Congress.
