= Bachíniva =

Town in the Mexican state of Chihuahua

Bachíniva Cabecera Municipal/Municipality
- Town and County / Pueblo y Municipio
- Santa Maria de Nativitas, Bachiniva
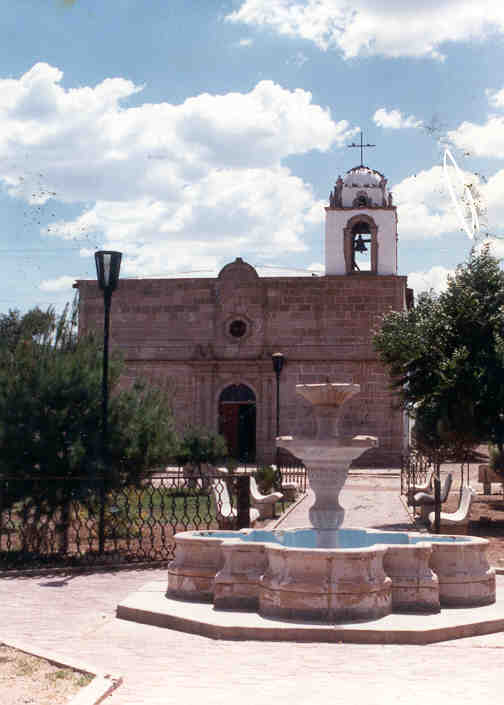
- MIssion Santa Maria de Nativitas Catholic Church
- Nickname: Paraiso de la Manzanas

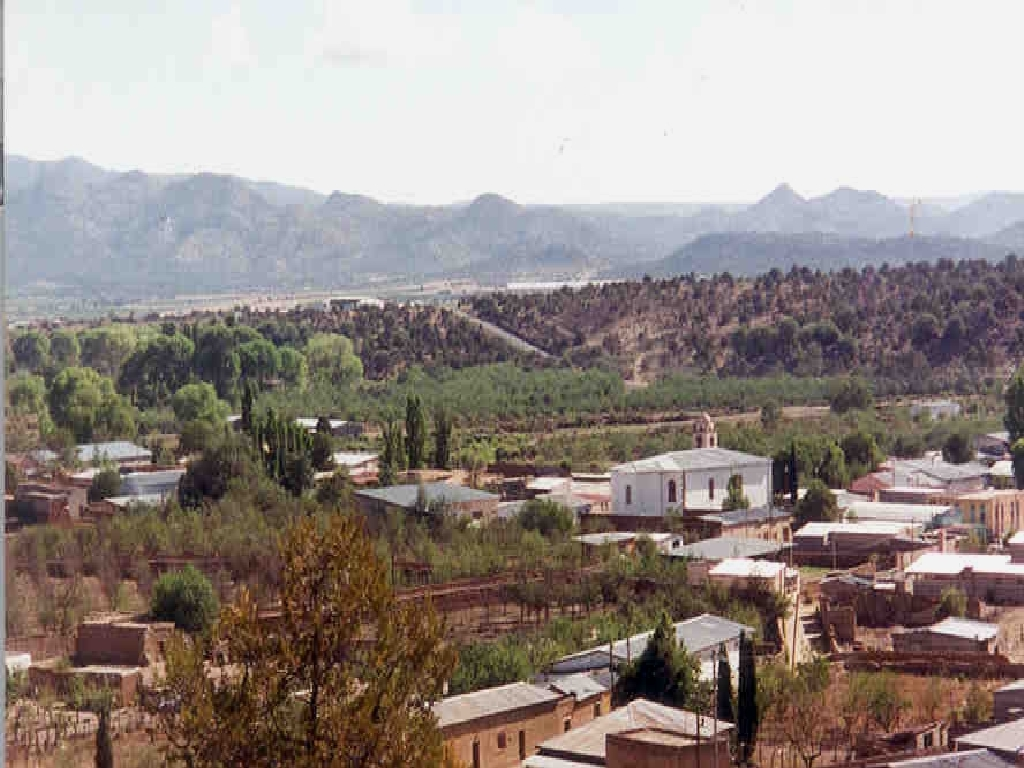

- Location in Mexico
- Coordinates: 28°46′13″N 107°15′20″W
- Country: Mexico
- State: Chihuahua
- Municipality: Bachíniva
- Founded (mission): 8 September 1660

Government
  - Type: Ayuntamiento
- Elevation: 2,025 m (6,644 ft)

Population (2020)
  - Total: 5,807
- Area code: 659
- Demonym: Bachinivense

Bachíniva is a town and county in the Mexican state of Chihuahua. The town serves as the county seat for the surrounding municipality of the same name. It was founded by Franciscan missionaries on September 8, 1660, as Santa María de Nativitas Bachiniva. Bachiniva is a Rarámuri native Indian word which means the place of the wild pumpkin flower. With the arrival of the Franciscan missionaries to the area, most natives left their settlement rejecting the evangelization process of the catholic church. Some of the natives however were converted to the new religion and the mission of Santa Maria de Nativitas Bachíniva was founded with a church that still stands today. Later on, Spanish immigrants and Mexican from the south of Mexico settled in the area along the fertile lands of the Santa Maria River. The Spanish missionaries found the area ideal for the growing and production of apples and they planted the first apple trees in the late 1600s and ever since the people of this municipality have been growing great apple crop along with other fruits and agricultural products. The apple production though is the main economic activity of the Bachiniva municipality.

As of 2020, the town of Bachíniva had a population of 5,807.

== Climate ==
Climate data for Bachíniva (1991–2020)
Month	Jan	Feb	Mar	Apr	May	Jun	Jul	Aug	Sep	Oct	Nov	Dec	Year
Record high °C (°F)	25.0 (77.0)	30.0 (86.0)	29.0 (84.2)	35.0 (95.0)	34.0 (93.2)	37.0 (98.6)	36.0 (96.8)	41.0 (105.8)	32.0 (89.6)	31.5 (88.7)	30.0 (86.0)	27.0 (80.6)	41.0 (105.8)
Mean daily maximum °C (°F)	15.9 (60.6)	17.5 (63.5)	20.1 (68.2)	23.5 (74.3)	27.3 (81.1)	29.8 (85.6)	26.9 (80.4)	25.9 (78.6)	25.0 (77.0)	23.3 (73.9)	19.4 (66.9)	15.7 (60.3)	22.5 (72.5)
Daily mean °C (°F)	7.0 (44.6)	8.7 (47.7)	11.0 (51.8)	14.1 (57.4)	17.5 (63.5)	20.8 (69.4)	20.0 (68.0)	19.2 (66.6)	17.7 (63.9)	14.5 (58.1)	10.3 (50.5)	6.9 (44.4)	14.0 (57.2)
Mean daily minimum °C (°F)	−1.8 (28.8)	−0.1 (31.8)	1.8 (35.2)	4.7 (40.5)	7.8 (46.0)	11.8 (53.2)	13.0 (55.4)	12.4 (54.3)	10.4 (50.7)	5.7 (42.3)	1.1 (34.0)	−1.9 (28.6)	5.4 (41.7)
Record low °C (°F)	−13.0 (8.6)	−22.0 (−7.6)	−25.0 (−13.0)	−6.0 (21.2)	−1.0 (30.2)	1.0 (33.8)	3.0 (37.4)	1.0 (33.8)	1.0 (33.8)	−8.0 (17.6)	−12.0 (10.4)	−16.0 (3.2)	−25.0 (−13.0)
Average precipitation mm (inches)	6.8 (0.27)	7.6 (0.30)	7.9 (0.31)	4.9 (0.19)	4.0 (0.16)	24.8 (0.98)	116.0 (4.57)	116.2 (4.57)	68.2 (2.69)	29.9 (1.18)	7.7 (0.30)	6.9 (0.27)	400.9 (15.78)
Average precipitation days (≥ 0.1 mm)	2.0	1.6	1.4	0.8	1.1	5.9	14.1	13.4	8.1	3.0	1.7	1.6	54.7
Source: Servicio Meteorologico Nacional
