= Manuel Benavides =

Town in the Mexican state of Chihuahua

- Town
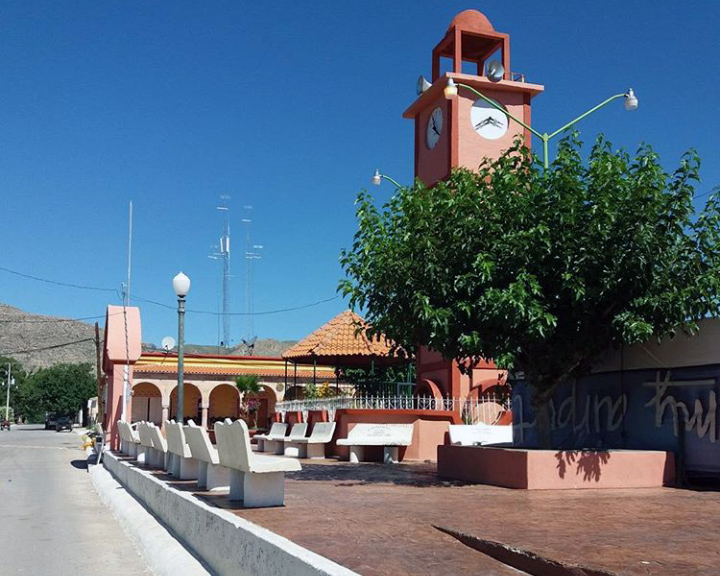
- Town center, 2018
- Motto(s): Esfuerzo, libertad, justicia
- Location in Mexico
- Coordinates: 29°6′N 103°54′W
- Country: Mexico
- State: Chihuahua
- Municipality: Manuel Benavides

Population (2020)
  - Total: 778

Manuel Benavides is a small town and seat of the municipality of Manuel Benavides, in the northern Mexican state of Chihuahua.

As of 2020, the town had a population of 778, down from 916 as of 2010.
