= Jiménez Municipality, Chihuahua =

Municipality in the Mexican state of Chihuahua

Jiménez
- Municipality
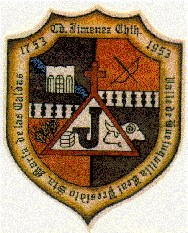
- Coat of arms

- Municipality of Jiménez in Chihuahua

- Location in Mexico
- Coordinates: 27°08′N 104°55′W
- Country: Mexico
- State: Chihuahua
- Municipal seat: José Mariano Jiménez
- Founded: December 14, 1824

Area
  - Total: 11,074.14 km^{2} (4,275.75 sq mi)

Population (2010)
  - Total: 41,265

Jiménez is one of the 67 municipalities of Chihuahua, in northern Mexico. The municipal seat lies at José Mariano Jiménez. The municipality covers an area of 11,074.14 km^{2}.

As of 2010, the municipality had a total population of 41,265, up from 40,467 as of 2005.

The municipality had 498 localities, the largest of which (with 2010 populations in parentheses) was: José Mariano Jiménez (34,281), classified as urban.

== Geography ==
=== Towns and villages ===
The municipality has 243 localities. The largest are:

Name	Population (2005)
José Mariano Jiménez	33,567
Escalón	757
Torreoncitos	445
Libertad	421
Estación Carrillo	359
San Felipe	346
Total Municipality	40467
