= Bachíniva Municipality =

Municipality in the Mexican state of Chihuahua

Bachíniva
- Municipality
- Municipality of Bachíniva in Chihuahua

- Location in Mexico
- Coordinates: 28°48′N 107°53′W
- Country: Mexico
- State: Chihuahua
- Municipal seat: Bachíniva

Area
  - Total: 1,691.9 km^{2} (653.2 sq mi)

Population (2010)
  - Total: 6,011

Bachíniva is one of the 67 municipalities of Chihuahua, in northern Mexico. The municipal seat lies at Bachíniva. The municipality covers an area of 1,691.9 km^{2}.

As of 2010, the municipality had a total population of 6,011, down from 7,242 as of 2005.

As of 2010, the town of Bachíniva had a population of 2,109. Other than the town of Bachíniva, the municipality had 117 localities, the largest of which (with 2010 populations in parentheses) was: El Porvenir (1,071), classified as rural.

The head of the municipality was founded in 1660 by the Orden de San Francisco de Asís, and was originally named Santa María de Nativitas de Bachimba, which was changed years later to the current Bachíniva.

Bachíniva is self-named the Apple Paradise, as it is home to many apple orchards. Many of the jobs in the municipality come from these orchards.
