= Jorge A. Rojas =

Second Quorum of the Seventy
- 6 April 1991 – 5 October 1996
- Called by: Ezra Taft Benson
- End reason: Honorably released

Personal details
- Born: Jorge Alfonso Rojas Ornelas; 27 September 1940 (age 84); Delicias, Chihuahua, Mexico

Jorge Alfonso Rojas Ornelas (born 27 September 1940) was a general authority of the Church of Jesus Christ of Latter-day Saints (LDS Church) from 1991 to 1996.

Rojas was born in Delicias, Chihuahua, Mexico. He was raised in Chihuahua City. Rojas convinced his parents, though none of them were Latter-day Saints, to send him to the LDS Church-owned Academia Juárez in Colonia Juárez so he could learn English. Rojas lived with Willard and Bertha Shupe while in Colonia Juárez, and they convinced him to attend English-language LDS Church meetings in order to assist him in learning English.

Rojas was baptized a member of the LDS Church in 1959. he received degrees in education and physical education from the University of Chihuahua and also studied at New Mexico State University.

Rojas was a teacher at the LDS Church-owned Benermerito School in Mexico City when it opened in 1964. Rojas married Marcella Burgos, a recent Benemerito graduate, in 1969 in the Mesa Arizona Temple.

Rojas continued to work for the Church Educational System and later in the area administrative offices. In 1988, Rojas and his wife set up a business translating technical manuals from English for American companies with factories in Mexico.

Rojas and his wife Marcella have five children.

When Rojas moved to Mexico City in 1964 he was immediately called as stake superintendent of the Young Men's Mutual Improvement Association, a calling equivalent to stake young men president in the current system of the LDS Church. Among other callings over the years he served as a branch president, a member of the stake high council and as a counselor in a stake presidency. Rojas served on two occasions as a stake president of the LDS Church. He also served two terms as a Regional Representative. Rojas was president of the Mexico Guadalajara Mission from 1981-1984.

Rojas became a member of the church's Second Quorum of the Seventy in 1991. He was released as a member of the quorum and as a general authority of the church in October 1996.

Rojas was called as an Area Seventy of the church in 2004. He has since served in the presidency of the Mexico North Area of the church. From 2008 to 2011, Rojas was the president of the Guayaquil Ecuador Temple.
