= Aldama Municipality, Chihuahua =

Municipality in the Mexican state of Chihuahua

Aldama
- Municipality
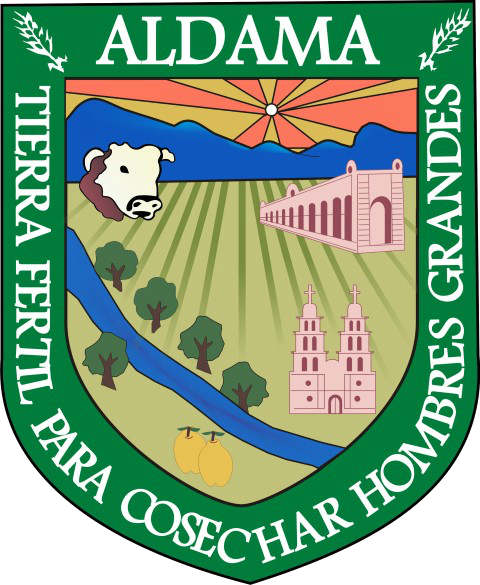
- Coat of arms

- Municipality of Aldama in Chihuahua
- Coordinates: 28°50′N 105°53′W
- Country: Mexico
- State: Chihuahua
- Founded: 1824
- Named for: Juan Aldama
- Seat: Juan Aldama
- Largest city: Juan Aldama

Area
  - Total: 9,835.9 km^{2} (3,797.7 sq mi)

Population (2010)
  - Total: 22,302

Aldama is one of the 67 municipalities of Chihuahua, in northern Mexico. The municipal seat lies at Juan Aldama.

As of 2010, the municipality had a total population of 22,302, up from 19,879 as of 2005. It covers an area of 9835.9 km^{2}.

The municipality had 487 localities, the largest of which (with 2010 populations in parentheses) was: Juan Aldama (18,642), classified as urban, and classified as rural.

== Geography ==
=== Towns and villages ===
Name	Population (2005)
Aldama	16,284
La Mesa	668
Estación Falomir	473
Placer de Guadalupe	165
San Diego de Alcalá	135
Total Municipality	19,879
