= La Cruz Municipality =

Municipality in the Mexican state of Chihuahua

La Cruz
- Municipality
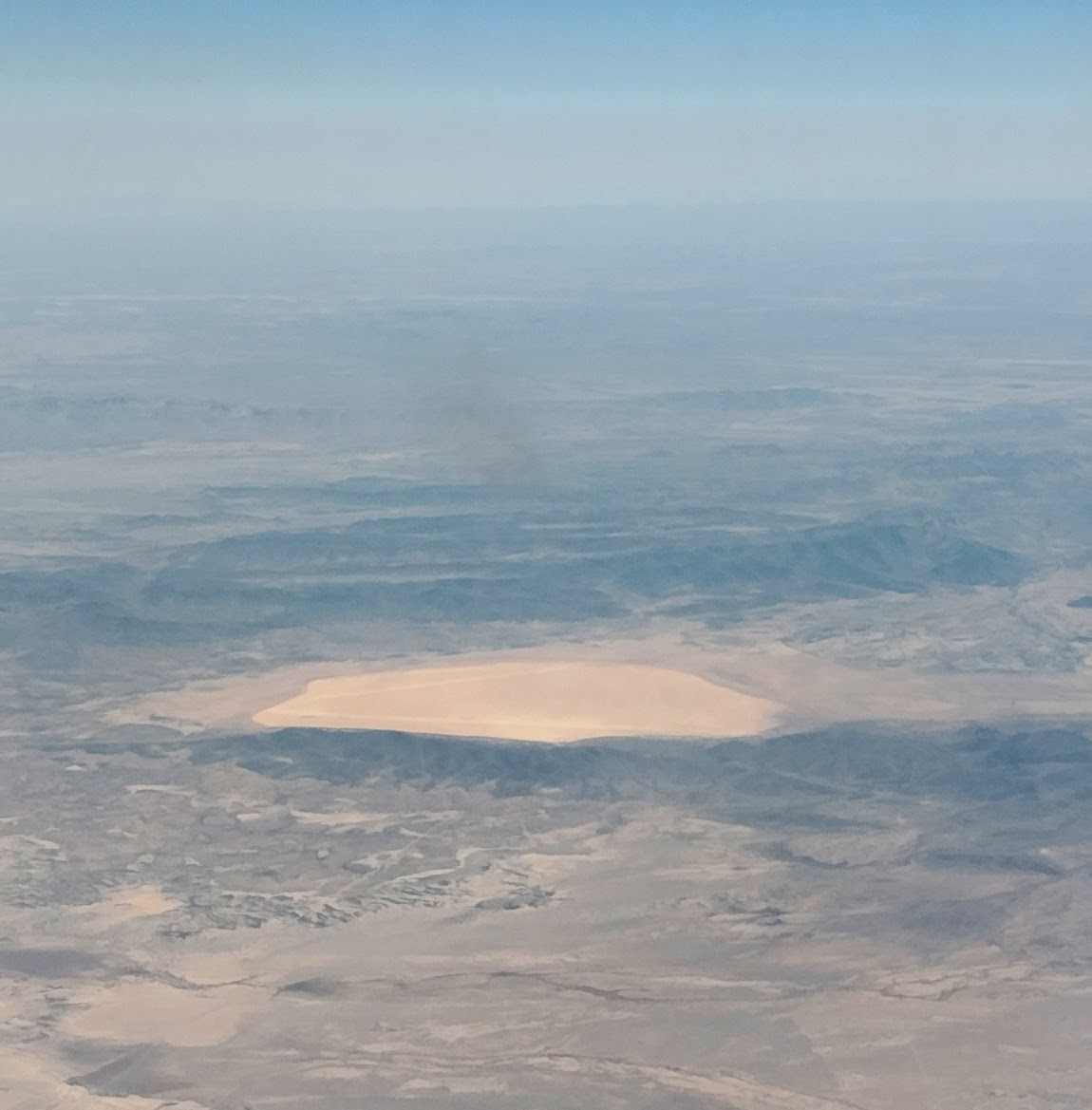
- Laguna Chincuas

- Municipality of La Cruz in Chihuahua

- Location in Mexico
- Coordinates: 27°51′N 105°11′W
- Country: Mexico
- State: Chihuahua
- Municipal seat: La Cruz

Area
  - Total: 1,035.9 km^{2} (400.0 sq mi)

Population (2010)
  - Total: 3,982

La Cruz is one of the 67 municipalities of Chihuahua, in northern Mexico. The municipal seat lies at La Cruz. The municipality covers an area of 1,035.9 km^{2}.

As of 2010, the municipality had a total population of 3,982, up from 3,844 as of 2005.

As of 2010, the town of La Cruz had a population of 1,671. Other than the town of La Cruz, the municipality had 65 localities, none of which had a population over 1,000.

== Geography ==
=== Towns and villages ===
The municipality has 27 localities. The largest are:

Name	Population (2005)
La Cruz	1,318
Estación La Cruz	737
Corraleño de Juárez	452
Total Municipality	3,844
