= Coyame =

Town in the Mexican state of Chihuahua

Santiago de Coyame
- Town
- Coyame is located in the Municipality of Coyame del Sotol

- Location in Mexico
- Coordinates: 29°27′41″N 105°05′50″W
- Country: Mexico
- State: Chihuahua
- Municipality: Coyame del Sotol
- Founded: 1715
- Elevation: 1,220 m (4,000 ft)

Population (2010)
  - Total: 709
- Time zone: UTC−06:00 (Zona Centro)
  - Summer (DST): UTC–05:00 (DST)
- Postal code: 32850
- Area code: 626
- Demonym: Coyamense

Coyame (formally: Santiago de Coyame) is a town in the Mexican state of Chihuahua. It serves as the municipal seat of Coyame del Sotol Municipality.

In the 2010 INEGI Census, the town reported a total population of 709.

It was founded in 1715 by the Spanish explorer Juan Antonio Traviña y Retes.

Coyame is also the location of a hot spring and a cave system.

== See also ==
- Coyame UFO Incident of 1974
