= Cuauhtémoc Municipality, Chihuahua =

Municipality in the Mexican state of Chihuahua

Cuauhtémoc
- Municipality
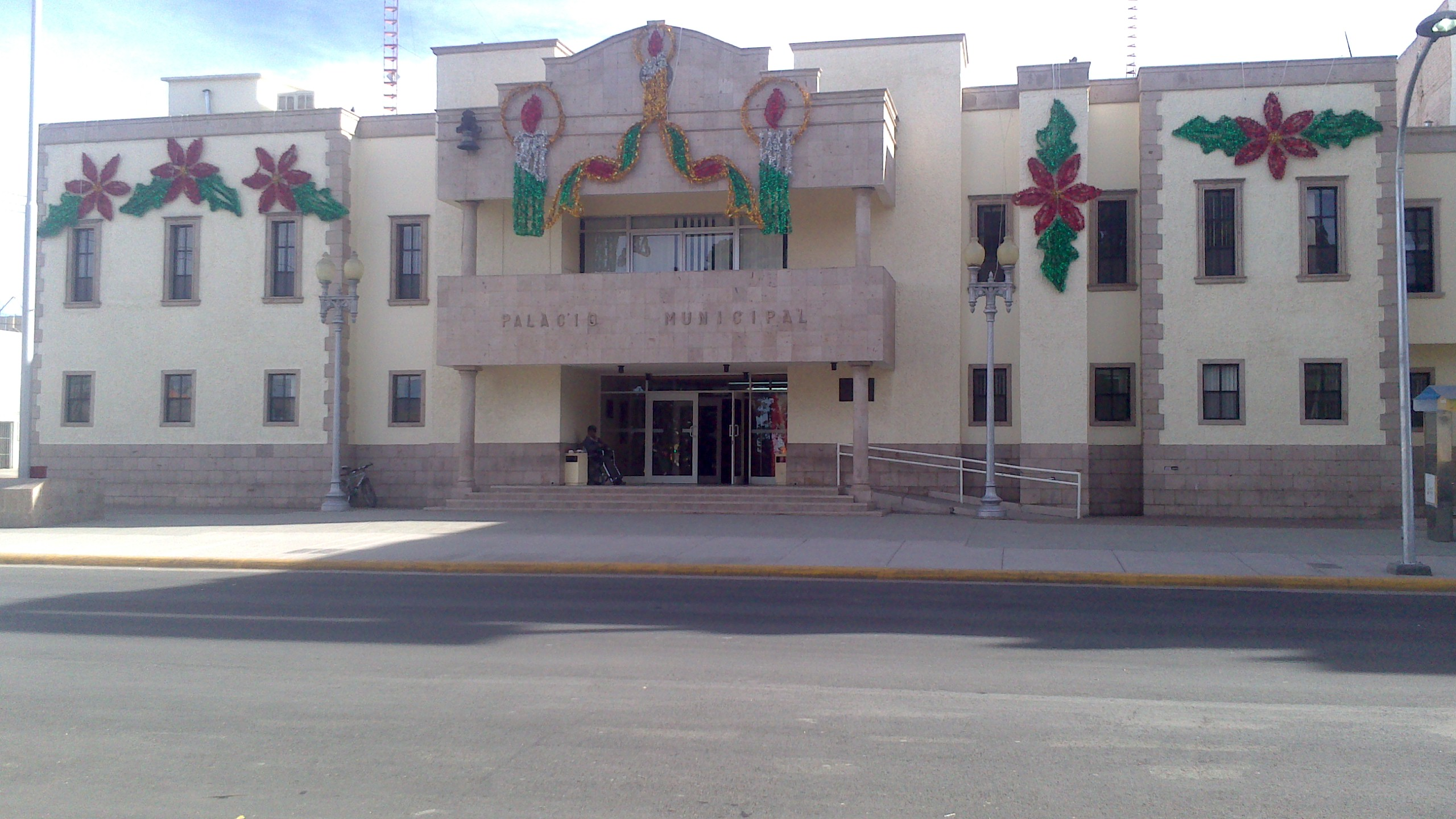

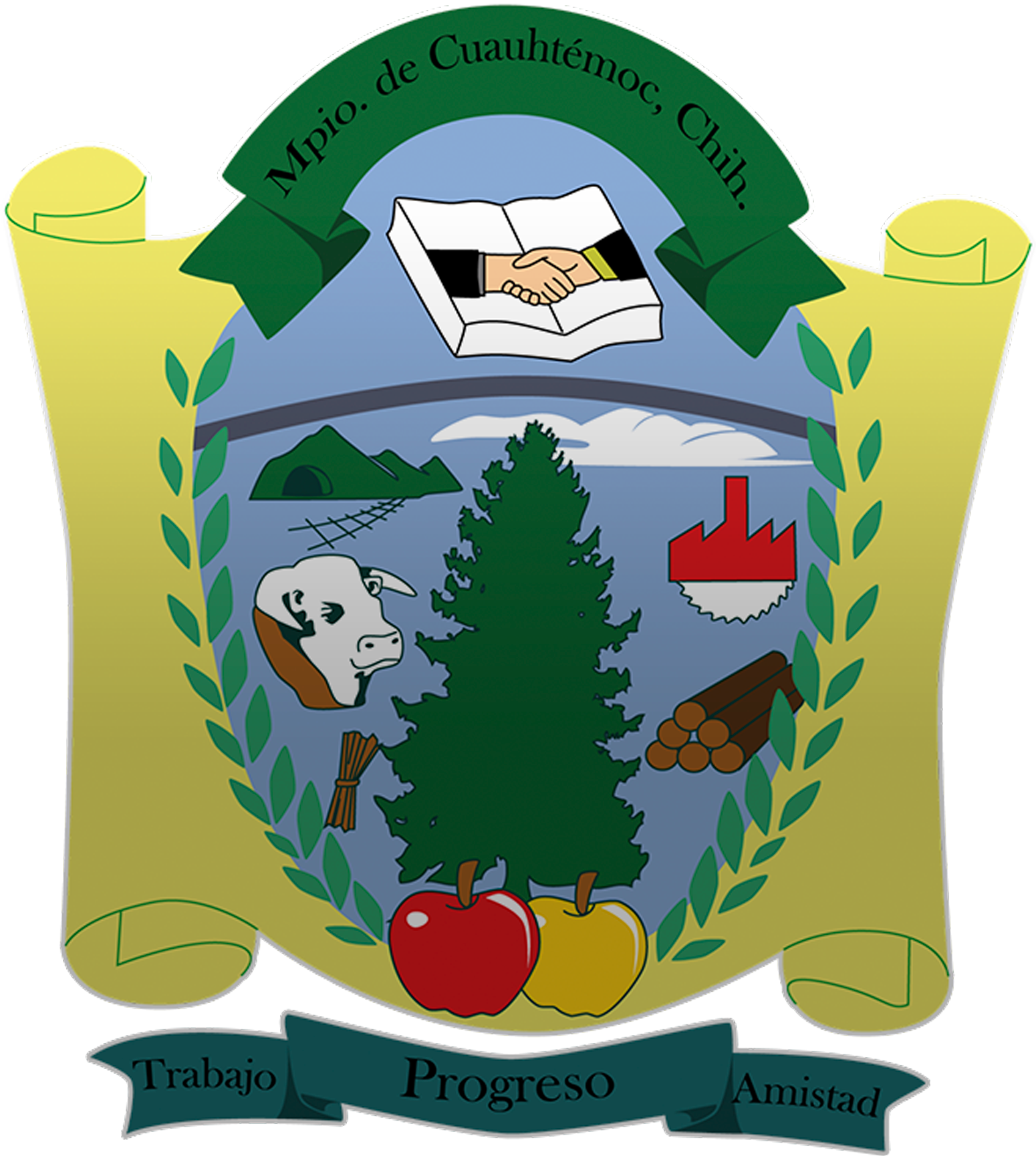
- Coat of arms

- Municipality of Cuauhtémoc in Chihuahua
- Coordinates: 28°25′N 106°52′W
- Country: Mexico
- State: Chihuahua
- Seat: Cuauhtémoc

Area
  - Total: 3,018.9 km^{2} (1,165.6 sq mi)

Population (2020)
  - Total: 180,638

Cuauhtémoc is a municipality in the Mexican state of Chihuahua. It was named after the Aztec Indian ruler Cuauhtémoc, which means "águila que cae" (fallen eagle). The municipality's seat is Cuauhtémoc, Chihuahua. The municipality is located to the west of the Chihuahua's capital city, Chihuahua. There is a close relation between three cultures in this region: Mennonite culture, Tarahumara culture and mestizo culture. Since 1994 there is a multi-cultural, multi-disciplinary arts festival known as "Festival de las Tres Culturas".

== Demographics ==
Historical population
Year	Pop.	±%
1930	17,543	—
1940	23,803	+35.7%
1950	33,966	+42.7%
1960	49,150	+44.7%
1970	56,163	+14.3%
1980	72,568	+29.2%
1990	89,451	+23.3%
2000	124,188	+38.8%
2010	154,639	+24.5%
2020	180,638	+16.8%

As of 2010, the municipality had a total population of 154,639,

As of 2010, the city of Cuauhtémoc had a population of 114,007. Other than the city of Cuauhtémoc, the municipality had 664 localities, the largest of which (with 2010 populations in parentheses) were: Colonia Anáhuac (9,952), classified as urban, and Colonia Obregón (Rubio) (2,241), and La Quemada (1,272), classified as rural.

== Crime ==
A narcofosas (mass graves attributed to organized crime) containing the remains of 15 people were discovered on ranches in December 2016.
