= Camargo Municipality, Chihuahua =

Municipality in the Mexican state of Chihuahua

Camargo
- Municipality
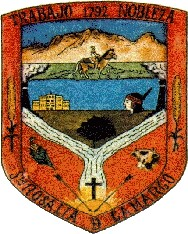
- Coat of arms

- Municipality of Camargo in Chihuahua

- Location in Mexico
- Coordinates: 27°41′N 105°10′W
- Country: Mexico
- State: Chihuahua
- Municipal seat: Santa Rosalía de Camargo

Area
  - Total: 16,066 km^{2} (6,203 sq mi)

Population (2010)
  - Total: 48,748

Camargo is one of the 67 municipalities of Chihuahua, in northern Mexico. The municipal seat lies at Santa Rosalía de Camargo. The municipality covers an area of 16,066 km^{2}.

As of 2010, the municipality had a total population of 48,748, up from 47,209 as of 2005.

The municipality had 623 localities, the largest of which (with 2010 populations in parentheses) was: Santa Rosalía de Camargo (40,221), classified as urban.

The municipality has the second-largest land area in the state (after Ahumada), and is also one of the largest in all of Mexico. It is almost all very sparsely populated except for the city of Santa Rosalía de Camargo, which is the seventh-largest community in the state in population with around 40,000.

== Geography ==
=== Towns and villages ===
Name	Population (2005)
Camargo	39,149
La Perla	898
San Ignacio	618
Total Municipality	47,209
