= Santa Rosalía de Camargo =

City in the Mexican state of Chihuahua

Camargo, Chihuahua
- City
- Santa Rosalía de Camargo
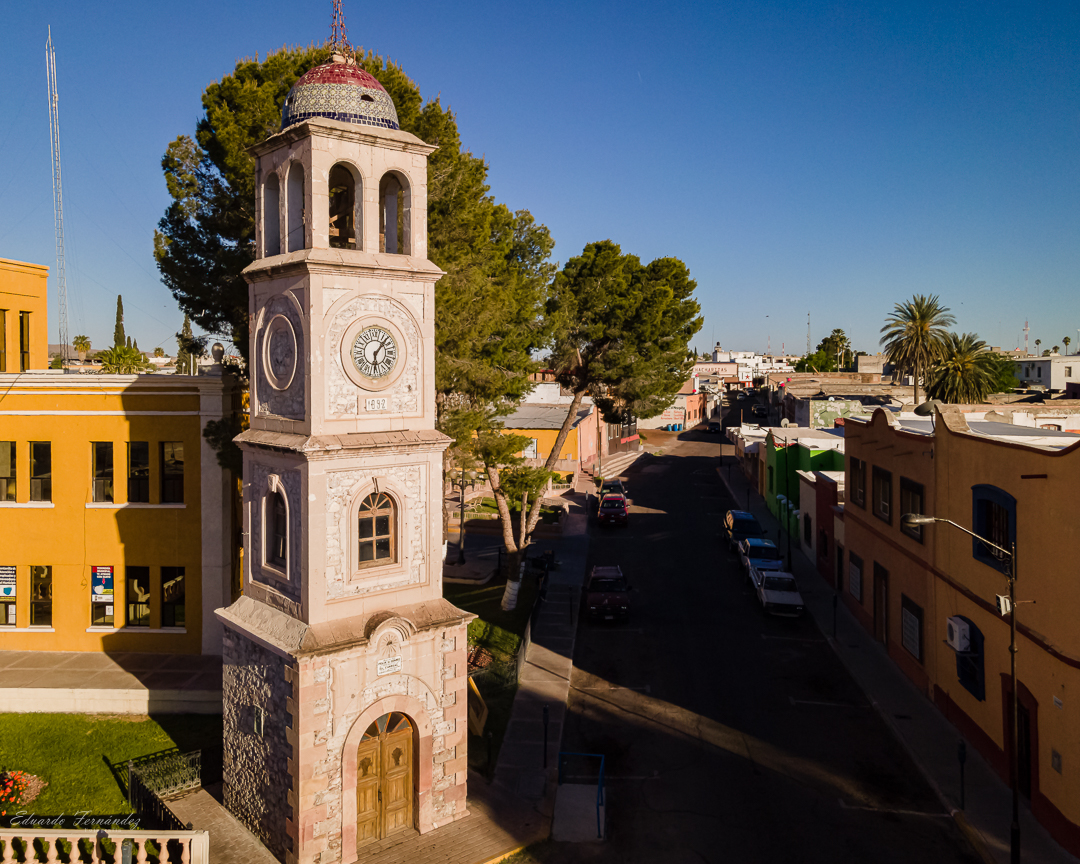

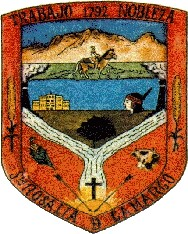
- Coat of arms
- Motto: The Pearl of the Conchos
- Location in Mexico Camargo, Chihuahua (Mexico)
- Coordinates: 27°41′13″N 105°10′21″W
- Country: Mexico
- State: Chihuahua
- Municipality: Camargo

Area
  - Total: 16,066.50 km^{2} (6,203.31 sq mi)
- Elevation: 1,250 m (4,100 ft)

Population (2010)
  - Total: 40,221
- Demonym: Camarguesian/Camargoan

Santa Rosalía de Camargo, originally called Santa Rosalía, and now known as "Ciudad Camargo" (Camargo City), is a city in the eastern part of the Mexican state of Chihuahua, located at the confluence of the Rio Parral and the Rio Conchos in the Allende Valley. It serves as the municipal seat of Camargo municipality and also serves as an important agricultural and livestock center for the area. Ciudad Camargo was originally founded in 1740 and refounded in 1792.

== Coat of Arms ==
In the upper part of the city's Coat of Arms, the following terms appear: TRABAJO 1792 NOBLEZA ("Work-1792-Nobility"), which represents the original motto of the city and its refounding date. It appears above a profile of the mountains along the Conchos River. In the center is the figure of a Spaniard on horseback; below that, the historic Municipal Presidency building and the head of a Tarahumara Indian wearing a collar appear facing each other, seen in profile. These figures are flanked by smoking chimneys that symbolize the industry of the city. The lower part displays a walnut tree planted at the confluence of two rivers, which flow downward to a cross rising from a sun in which Apache arrows appear, symbolizing the depopulation of the old settlement of the region by the attack of these indigenous groups. Under the left river branch, agriculture is represented with a pheasant; under the right river branch, livestock is represented with a cow skull.

A sheath of maize appears along each side of the shield. On the lower apex of the shield appears the city's name: SANTA ROSALÍA DE CAMARGO.

== History ==
The lands located between the existing town of San Francisco de Conchos and the confluence of the Río Concho and Río Florido rivers were explored by Francisco Escárcega on June 12, 1687, at the direction of the Governor of Nueva Vizcaya, Don José de Neyra y Quiroga. In 1740, the site at the confluence of the Río Concho and Río Parral rivers was established as a town with the name of Santa Rosalía for the Catholic missionaries who were assigned to administer in the area.

In 1745, Apache raiders from further north began looting and terrorizing Spanish settlements through the entire Allende Valley. They attacked the town of San Francisco de Conchos on March 25, when they killed the Franciscan missionary friars Tomás de Zigarán and Francisco de Labado who served the mission. They also burned the church and the friars' house. The Apaches then immediately attacked the town of San Pedro de Conchos; there, the missionary left before befalling any harm and took refuge with the Jesuits in Satevó. From Valle de Allende, the friars and Spanish residents were evacuated to Villa López before the raiders arrived; but they were unable to prevent the Apache from burning the convent and the sanctuary.

General Francisco Montaño de la Cueva led the campaign against the insurgents, rounding them up and immediately imposing the peace. But he hanged thirteen of the native leaders determined to be responsible for the uprising and the death of the missionaries in the Allende Valley.

The attacks of the Apache raiders caused an abandonment of the town, but it was re-established and repopulated on November 25, 1792, with the same name of Santa Rosalía by the Captain Jose Manuel Ochoa, taking orders from General Pedro de Nava, General Commander of the Internal Provinces. The town was re-established with 28 neighbors brought from the Presidio of Conchos, which continued to impose oversight and control over the town until 1820, when the town was given the category of Municipality under the restored Spanish Constitution of Cádiz. In 1826, the community was made part of the political district of Rosales; in 1837, it was included in the sub-prefecture of Jiménez; in 1847, included in the Cantón Jiménez; in 1859, separated to create the Canton Camargo; and from 1887 to 1911, it was included in the Camargo District. In 1897, after 100 years of life, at the request of the Camargan deputy Pedro Carbajal, the local Congress granted the community the title of City with the name of Camargo in honor of the Caudillo insurgent Ignacio Camargo who was shot in Chihuahua during the War of Independence on May 10, 1811.

On August 31, 1860, in Santa Rosalía, Captain Jesus Duarte, with a section of Liberal troops, defeated the Conservative leader Jose Macias, who was left lying on the field with 32 dead and several wounded.

On September 1, 1876, Mayor José Perfecto Lomelín, declared the local government to be in favor of the Tuxtepec Plan and occupied the Plaza de Camargo, which had previously been under the control of Governor Manuel de Herrera and the Chihuahua National Guard.

On April 23, 1913, Constitutionalist Generals Manuel Chao, Rosalío Hernández and Maclovio Herrera attacked the Plaza de Camargo that had become occupied by Huerta troops under the command of General Manuel García Pueblita. The Constitutionalist troops were defeated, leaving the Plaza and the City in the hands of the assailants.

On December 12, 1916, General Francisco Villa attacked and captured the Plaza de Camargo, defended by General Rosalío Hernández with government troops from where they were evicted. All the captured prisoners were shot on Villa's orders.

On January 5, 2017, at the Camargo toll booth on State Highway 45, about a thousand citizens demonstrated against the "gasolinazo" (gasoline tax rise). The State Police were dispatched to end the demonstration; when they arrived, rather than confronting the officers, the demonstrators raised their hands in mass to show that they did not carry weapons, then sat down and sang the National Anthem with one voice. The act was unprecedented in national history.

== Geography ==
=== Climate ===
Carmargo has a semi-arid climate (Köppen climate classification BSh) with mild winters and hot summers. The average high in hottest month is 36 °C (97 °F) while the average low is 19 °C (66 °F). Winters are mild with an average high of 20 °C (68 °F) and an average low of 2 °C (36 °F) in January. Precipitation is sparse though it is higher from July to September.

Climate data for Camargo
Month	Jan	Feb	Mar	Apr	May	Jun	Jul	Aug	Sep	Oct	Nov	Dec	Year
Record high °C (°F)	40.0 (104.0)	35.0 (95.0)	38.0 (100.4)	47.0 (116.6)	50.0 (122.0)	50.0 (122.0)	44.0 (111.2)	43.0 (109.4)	41.5 (106.7)	40.0 (104.0)	36.0 (96.8)	33.0 (91.4)	50.0 (122.0)
Mean daily maximum °C (°F)	20.4 (68.7)	23.3 (73.9)	27.1 (80.8)	31.1 (88.0)	34.7 (94.5)	36.7 (98.1)	34.4 (93.9)	33.5 (92.3)	31.8 (89.2)	29.2 (84.6)	24.4 (75.9)	20.8 (69.4)	29.0 (84.2)
Daily mean °C (°F)	11.0 (51.8)	13.4 (56.1)	16.9 (62.4)	21.2 (70.2)	25.2 (77.4)	28.1 (82.6)	27.0 (80.6)	26.2 (79.2)	24.2 (75.6)	20.4 (68.7)	14.8 (58.6)	11.5 (52.7)	20.0 (68.0)
Mean daily minimum °C (°F)	1.5 (34.7)	3.4 (38.1)	6.8 (44.2)	11.3 (52.3)	15.8 (60.4)	19.6 (67.3)	19.5 (67.1)	18.9 (66.0)	16.7 (62.1)	11.6 (52.9)	5.3 (41.5)	2.2 (36.0)	11.1 (52.0)
Record low °C (°F)	−13.0 (8.6)	−9.0 (15.8)	−9.0 (15.8)	−2.0 (28.4)	6.0 (42.8)	3.5 (38.3)	10.0 (50.0)	11.0 (51.8)	4.0 (39.2)	−1.5 (29.3)	−7.0 (19.4)	−10.0 (14.0)	−13.0 (8.6)
Average precipitation mm (inches)	9.0 (0.35)	10.3 (0.41)	3.6 (0.14)	5.6 (0.22)	16.7 (0.66)	50.0 (1.97)	83.8 (3.30)	73.7 (2.90)	83.7 (3.30)	29.6 (1.17)	8.6 (0.34)	10.6 (0.42)	385.2 (15.17)
Average precipitation days (≥ 0.1 mm)	1.9	1.4	0.9	1.3	2.2	5.4	9.9	9.2	7.0	3.3	1.5	1.9	45.9
Average snowy days	0.16	0.16	0.06	0	0	0	0	0	0	0	0.23	0.16	0.77
Source 1: Servicio Meteorologico Nacional
Source 2: Colegio de Postgraduados

=== Neighborhoods of Camargo ===
The Camargo's Municipality has 248 "Colonias" (neighborhoods) and "Zonas Conurbadas" which make the entire city.

== Population ==
Camargo is ethnically diverse, but mostly of European origin, composed primarily of Spanish, Mestizos, Basque, Portuguese, French, Italian, German, Mennonites, South African Boers, and Conchos Indians. As of 2010, the city had a total population of 40,221, up from 39,149 as of 2005.

== Tourism ==
Tourism is a popular activity and a generating potential of currencies, because Camargo City and vicinity possesses a great number of natural attractions, the most popular being:

- Colina lake With calm waters where one can practice different aquatic sports, as water skiing, jet skiing, and boating.
- "Ojo Caliente" Resort With thermal and sulphurous waters, located 4 km from Camargo.
- Los Filtros With birth of moderate templated waters, it is located to only 30 km from Camargo's city
- Presa la Boquilla is located to the southwest of the city, one of the most beautiful and interesting places of the region.

== Interesting places to go ==
- Plaza Juarez (park)
- City Hall
- "Puerta de Camargo" monument
- Santa Rosalia Church
- Santuario Church
- "Acueducto" monument
- Bicentenary Park
- Rancho El Floreno
- "Faro" monument
- "Lucha Villa Statue"

== Commerce ==
Besides tourism, The region is known for agriculture, cattle, corn, pecan trees and its surrounding mountains. Wheat, sorghum, cotton, soy bean, maize (corn), beans, chilis, alfalfa, and onions are all grown in the area. Nuts, grapes, apricots, watermelon, melons, pears, plums, and peaches are also grown there.

The Tarahumara Indians living up in the mountains outside of the city regularly come into Ciudad Camargo to sell produce and other goods to the local populace.

== Schools in Ciudad Camargo ==
Name	Level	Type
Adolfo Lopez Mateos	Primary School	Public
Alonso N Urueta	Primary School	Public
Amado Nervo Institute	Kindergarten, Primary, Junior High School	Private
Antonio Casso	Kindergarten	Public
Arturo Armendariz Delgado	Kindergarten	Public
Benemérito de las Américas. ES-4	Junior High School	Public
Benito Juárez	Primary School	Public
Bertha Von Glumer 1392	Kindergarten	Public
Bini Re'e	Kindergarten	Public
CAMLE S.C. CENDI	Preschool	Private
Bilingual college Carmen Ibarra de Briseño	Kindergarten, Primary School	Private
CEDEX Cuitlahuac 3410	Adult Education	Public
CENDI SEP.# 10	Preschool	Public
Multiple Attention Center # 2	Special Education	Public
Center of Technological and Industrial Services Baccalaureate # 143	Technical High School	Public
Commercial Training Center	Adult Education	Private
Superior Studies Center of Camargo	University	Private
Chihuahua Scholar Center	Adult Education, Work Training	Private
20–30 Club	Kindergarten	Public
Cuitlahuac # 2334	Primary School	Public
Division Del Norte Highschool	High School	Semi-Private
Edmundo Porras Fierro 2212	Primary School	Public
Sexual Education	Adult Education, Work Training	Public
Enrique Laubscher	Kindergarten	Public
Infantile Stays Camargo Chihuahua Mexico	Preschool	Private
Infantile Stays Camargo A. C. 059	Preschool	Private
Esther T. Castellanos #2230	Primary School	Public
Faculty of Accountancy and Administration, Chihuahua's Autonomous University, Extension Camargo	University	Public Autonomous
Colegio de Bachilleres del Estado de Chihuahua Plantel 15	High School	Public
Fernando Ahuatzin Reyes	Primary School	Public
Francisco I. Madero	Primary School	Public
Gregorio M. Solis	Primary School	Public
Hector de la Garza 2764	Primary School	Public
Ignacia Rodriguez Lozoya	Primary School	Public
Ignacio Camargo 2039	Primary School	Public
Institute of managerial computation Camargo	Adult Education, Work Training	Private
Irma Aceves de Galindo 2773	Primary School	Public
Jaime Torres Bodet	Primary School	Public
Jesus Hilario Cardona Rodriguez	Adult Education, Secondary Grade	Public
Jose Refugio Mar de la Rosa	Primary School	Public
Jose Rosas Moreno	Kindergarten	Public
Lazaro Cardenas	Primary School	Public
María de Jesus Bejarano 2040	Primary School	Public
Maria Curie	Primary school	Public
Maria del Refugio Hermosillo	Kindergarten	Public
Maria Montessori	Kindergarten	Public
Netzahualcoyotl	Primary School	Public
Niños Heroes 1364	Primary School	Public
Aborigen School, (Ethnical school)	Kindergarten, Primary School	Public
Ramon Lopez Velarde	Kindergarten	Public
Salvador Martinez Prieto 1330	Kindergarten	Public
State's Junior High School 3032	Junior High School	Public
State's Junior High School 3063	Junior High School	Public
Technical Secondary School No. 35	Junior High School	Public

== Notable people ==
- Velia Aguilar Armendáriz, Mexican politician
- David Alfaro Siqueiros, Mexican social realist painter (Originally from Chihuahua, Chihuahua)
- Luis H. Álvarez, Mexican industrialist and politician
- Socorro Bonilla, Mexican actress
- Alma Delfina, Mexican actress
- Práxedes Giner Durán, Mexican military official (General officer), politician (Governor of Chihuahua) and member of the Institutional Revolutionary Party (PRI)
- Oka Giner, Mexican actress
- Aarón Hernán, Mexican telenovela and film actor
- Sebastián, Mexican sculptor
- María Sorté, Mexican actress and singer
- Lucha Villa, Mexican singer and actress (Golden Age of Mexican cinema)
