= San Francisco de Conchos =

Town in the Mexican state of Chihuahua

San Francisco de Conchos San Pancho
- Town
- Location in Mexico San Francisco de Conchos (Mexico)
- Coordinates: 27°35′N 105°19′W
- Country: Mexico
- State: Chihuahua
- Municipality: San Francisco de Conchos
- Founded: October 4, 1604; 421 years ago

Government
  - Mayor: Norma Pavia 2024-2027

Population (2010)
  - Total: 644
- Time zone: UTC−6 (ST)

San Francisco de Conchos is a town and seat of the municipality of San Francisco de Conchos, in the northern Mexican state of Chihuahua. As of 2010, the town had a population of 644, up from 596 in 2005.

It was founded by Fray Alonso de la Oliva in 1604, and is the second oldest town in Chihuahua after Santa Bárbara.The town was named in honor of its patron saint, Saint Francis of Assisi, and the people of the Conchos tribe.

== History ==
San Francisco de Conchos was founded by Fray Alonso de la Oliva, a young missionary who wanted to preach to indigenous communities. In 1604, he founded the Mission San Francisco de los Naturales del Rio de las Conchas, a Franciscan mission.

The name "Conchos" comes from the many small shells that were found in the bed of the Río Conchos. The name was also given to the inhabitants along its banks, the Conchos Indians.

More than 4,000 people from various indigenous communities were at different times brought to live at the Mission San Francisco de Conchos.

In 1685, a Spanish presidio was founded at San Francisco de Conchos, in response to the Pueblo Revolt of 1680.
