= Rosales Municipality =

Municipality in the Mexican state of Chihuahua

Rosales
- Municipality
- Municipality of Rosales in Chihuahua
- Coordinates: 28°11′N 105°33′W
- Country: Mexico
- State: Chihuahua
- Founded: 1825
- Named for: Víctor Rosales
- Seat: Santa Cruz de Rosales
- Largest city: Santa Cruz de Rosales

Area
  - Total: 1,716.6 km^{2} (662.8 sq mi)

Population (2010)
  - Total: 16,785
  - Density: 9.7780/km^{2} (25.325/sq mi)

Rosales is one of the 67 municipalities of Chihuahua, in northern Mexico. The municipal seat lies at Santa Cruz de Rosales. The municipality covers an area of 1716.6 km^{2}.

As of 2010, the municipality had a total population of 16,785, up from 15,935 as of 2005.

The municipality has 15 localities, the largest of which (with 2010 populations in parentheses) were: Santa Cruz de Rosales (5,570), Congregación Ortíz (2,620), classified as urban, and El Molino (2,191) and Kilómetro Noventa y Nueve (1,092), classified as rural.

== Geography ==
=== Towns and villages ===
The municipality has 15 localities. The largest are:

Name	Population (2005)
Santa Cruz de Rosales	5,377
Congregación Ortiz	2,543
El Molino	2,007
Kilómetro Noventa y Nueve	944
Ex-hacienda Delicias	740
Barranco Blanco	737
Salón de Actos	621
Total Municipality	15,935
