= Delicias, Chihuahua =

City in the Mexican state of Chihuahua

- City
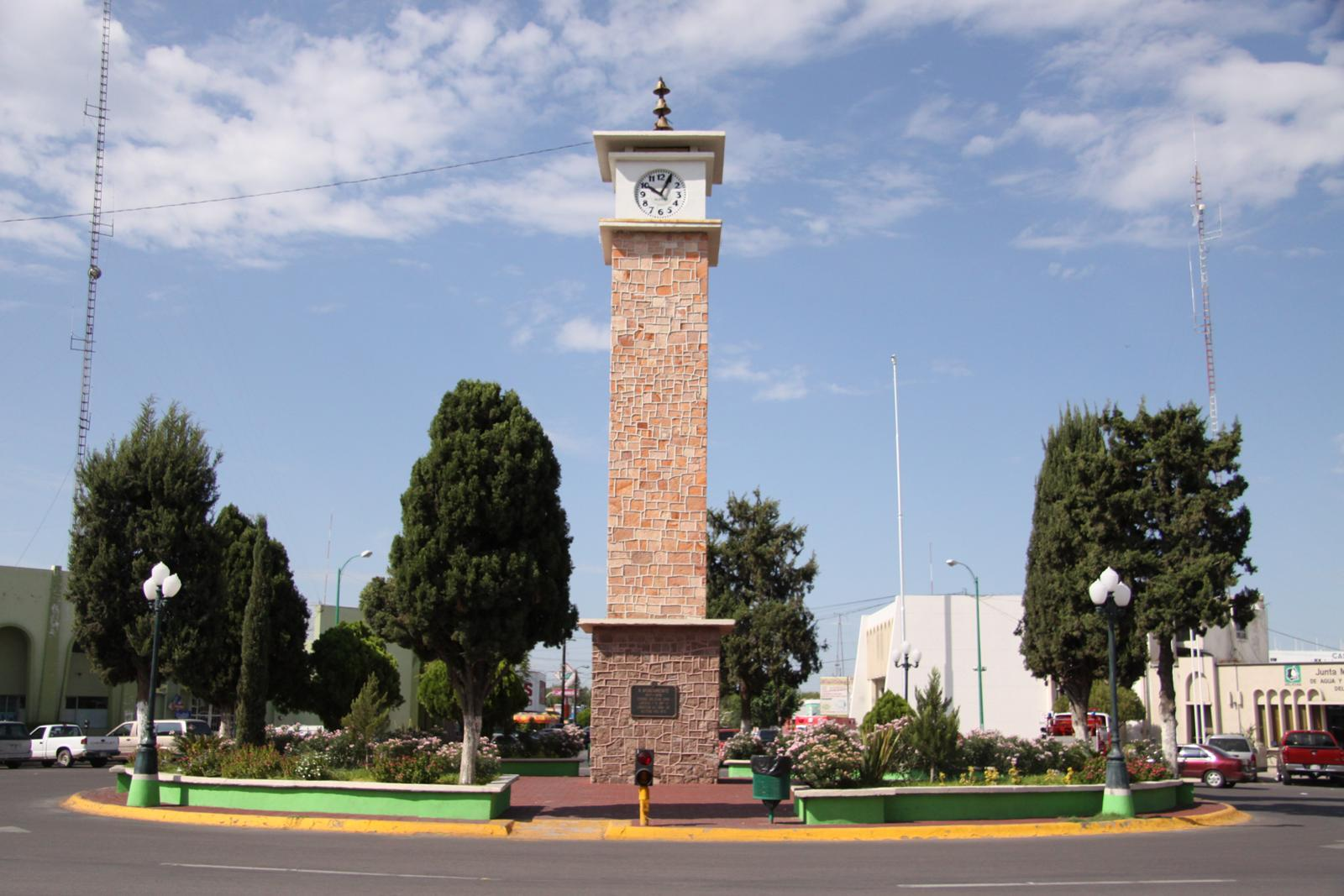
- The city clock tower

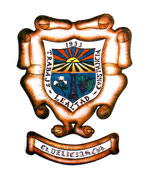
- Coat of arms

- Location within Chihuahua Location within Mexico
- Coordinates: 28°6′3″N 106°0′8″W
- Country: Mexico
- State: Chihuahua
- Municipality: Delicias
- Foundation: April 1, 1933

Government
  - Municipal president: Jesus Valenciano García (PAN)
- Elevation: 1,415 m (4,642 ft)

Population (2015)
  - City: 148,045
  - Metro: 223,993
- Time zone: UTC−6 (CST)
- Postal code: 33000
- Area code: 639
- Climate: BWh
- Website: http://www.delicias.gob.mx

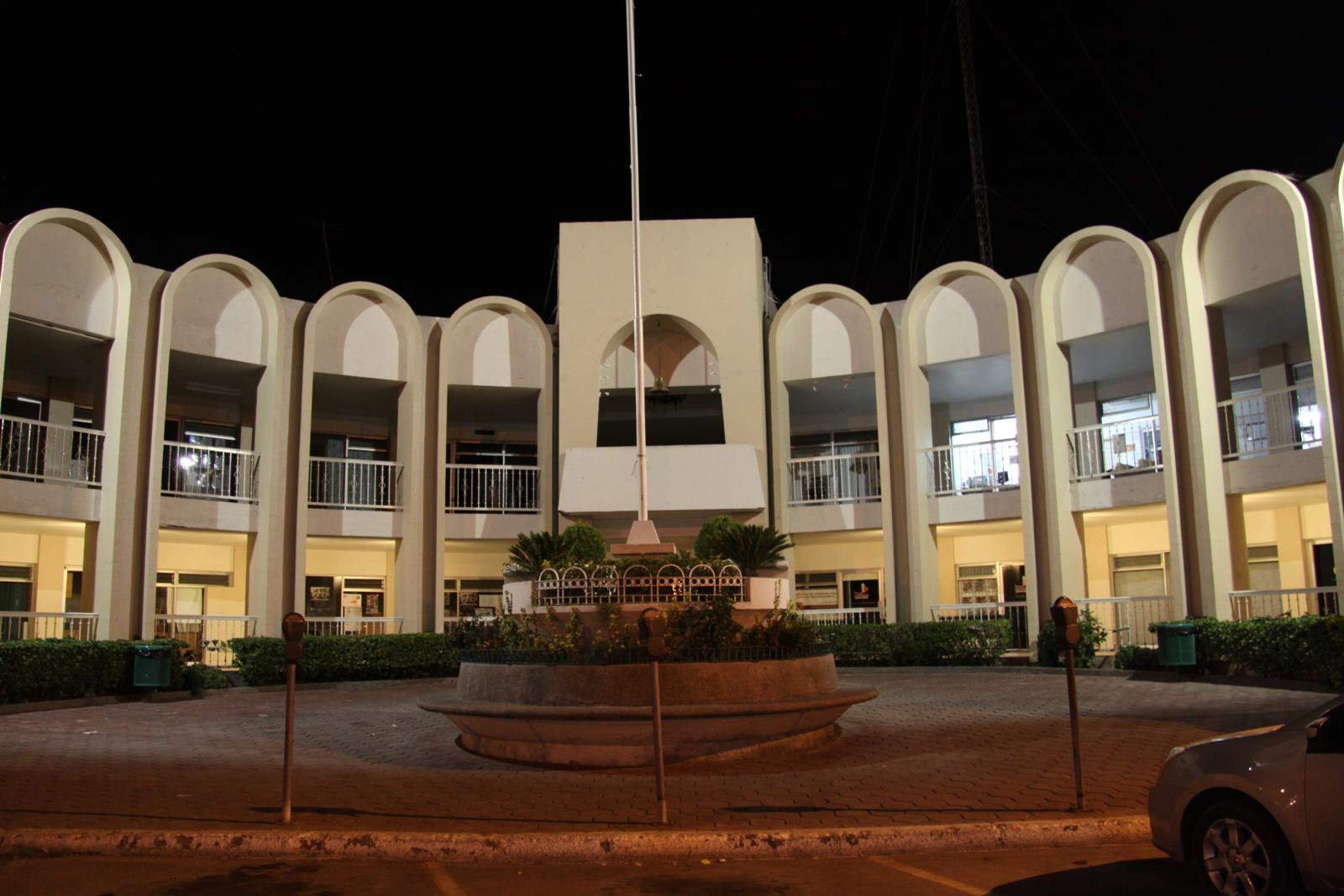
City Hall

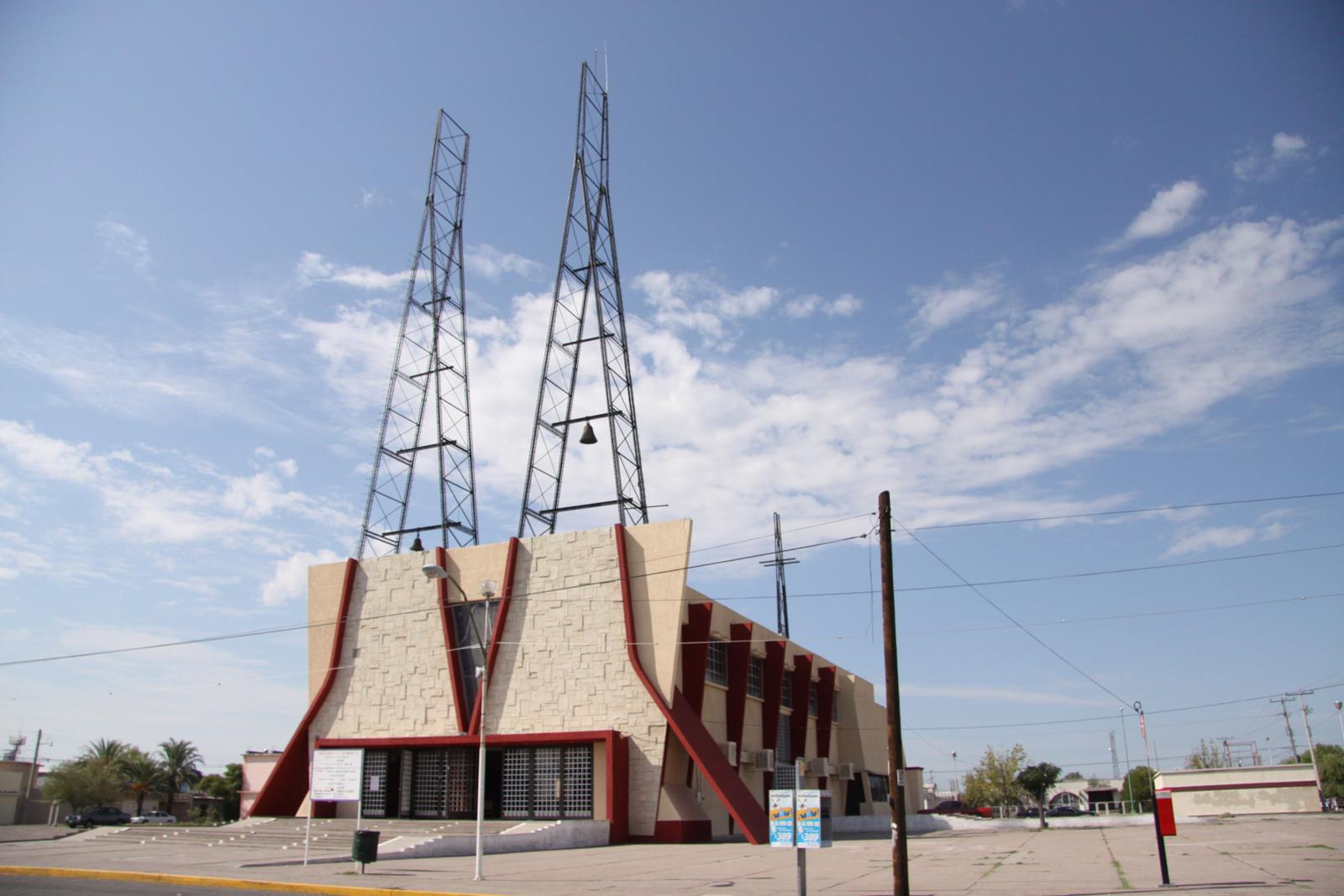
Guadalupe Sanctuary

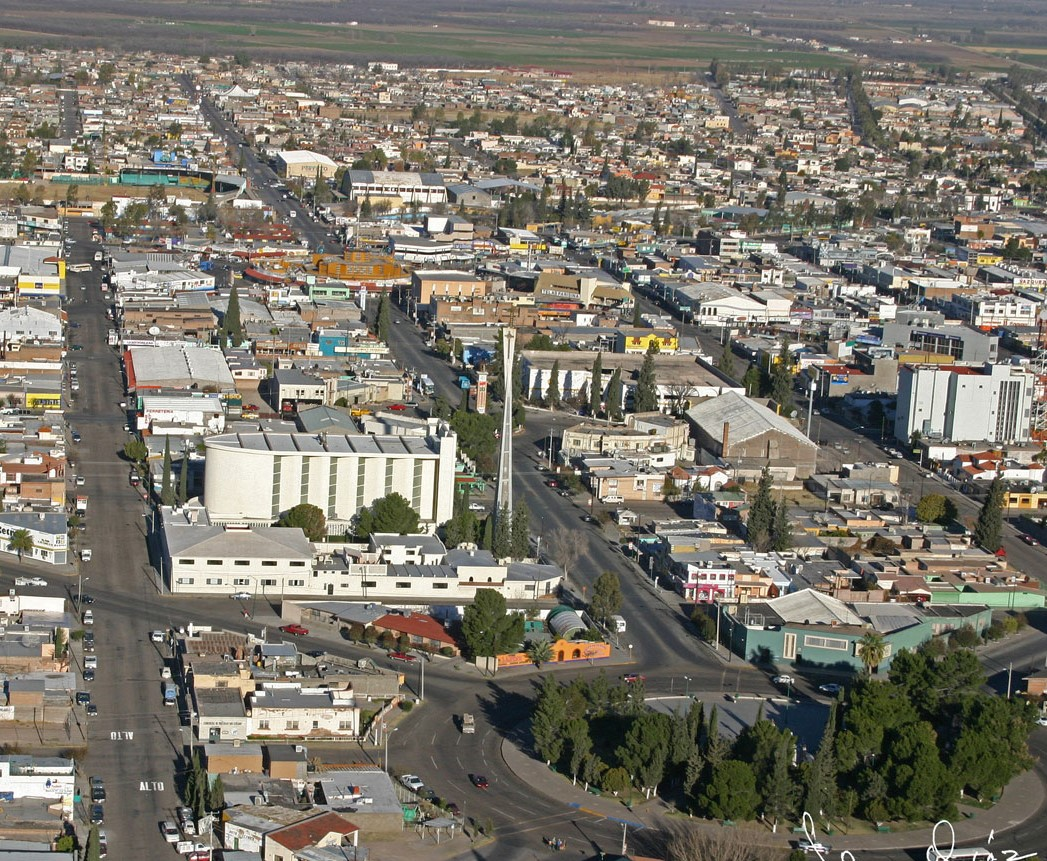
Park Avenue

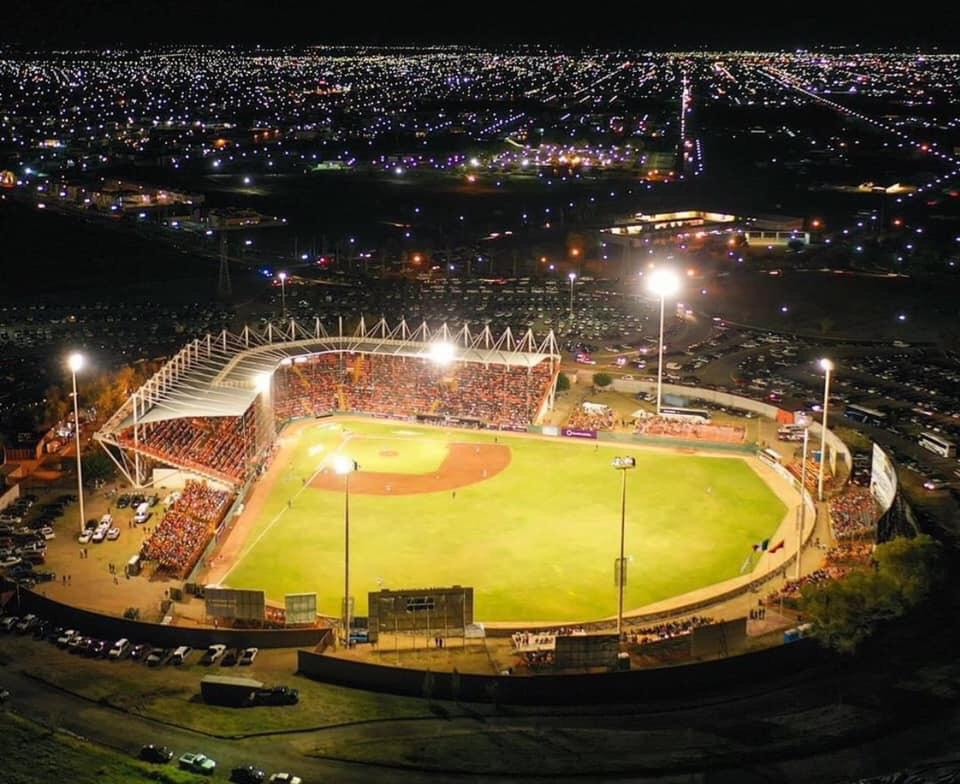
Great Baseball Stadium in Delicias.

Delicias (Spanish for Delights) is a city in the Mexican state of Chihuahua and serves as the seat of the municipality of the same name. The current president of this town is Jesus Valenciano. It is located southeast of the state capital, Chihuahua. Delicias was declared an official municipality of the state of Chihuahua on January 7, 1935. Delicias is a small industrial city and a major agricultural center located in the Conchos River Valley. As of 2015, the city of Delicias had a population of 148,045 inhabitants, while the metropolitan area had a population of 223,993 inhabitants. It was founded on 30 April 1933, making it one of Mexico's youngest cities. The municipality of Delicias is one of the smallest in the state in terms of size area.

== History ==
Prehistoric artifacts have been found in the Conchos River Valley that show evidence that indigenous people lived in the area for centuries before European settlers arrived in the area. Several indigenous mummies were found in the valley and are on display in the Museum of Paleontology in Delicias.

The area of present-day Delicias began to attract settlers in 1884 when the Central Mexican Railroad Company built a railroad station to fulfill the transportation demands for agricultural products from the Old Delicias Hacienda. In 1888, German settlers arrived in the area and built Hacienda Polvorosa; they began to prepare food items, brew beer, and produce steel instruments. However, the German settlers were forced to leave after continuous persecution by the Villistas. The Old Delicias Hacienda and Hacienda Polvorosa were the beginnings of the Delicias settlement. Later Hacienda Polvorosa was renamed El Hotel del Norte; this is now a popular museum in town. During the next few decades, the surrounding area began to grow and many small municipalities like Rosales, Meoqui, and Saucillo began to sprout. In 1932, the Chihuahua State Congress recognized this area as an important agricultural region, and named it Region 5. The city of Delicias was founded in 1933 after the Mexican Revolution and was officially declared a municipality on January 7, 1935.

In 1939 cotton in the Conchos River Valley helped build a foundation for a small industrial sector in Delicias. Cotton Gins and American Petroleum Refineries were built to provide services and products needed to fuel the agriculture sector. The Francisco I. Madero Dam was built, which increased crop yields and grew the population in the valley. During the 1940s, Cotton became such a dominant cash crop that by 1943 it replaced many vineyards in the surrounding area. Cotton continued to be the dominant crop of the Conchos River Valley until 1953, when the price of cotton plunged and forced many farmers in the area to diversify the agriculture economy.

The modern layout of Delicias was designed by Carlos G. Blake and was approved by the National Commission of Irrigation on September 30, 1960. The Chihuahua State Congress recognized Delicias as a city on October 29, 1960. That same year, a geological study on the Conchos River was conducted in Region 5 in attempts to build the largest dam in the state of Chihuahua. By 1960, Delicias was the fourth most populous city in the state of Chihuahua (after Juarez, Chihuahua and Cuauhtemoc City).

Delicias continued to grow in population and as a successful agricultural center. Delicias had an agricultural based economy until 1980 when important exporting maquiladoras moved to the city which helped increase the manufacturing sector. By 1990, Delicias was home to seven maquiladoras, making it one of the most important municipalities of the state of Chihuahua.

== Geography ==
Delicias is located at 28º11’35" N Latitude and 105º28’18" W Longitude, 1,170 metres (3,840 ft) above sea level. Delicias lies in the rich Conchos River Valley and Meoqui to the north and Saucillo to the south and Rosales to the west. The Conchos River flows north on the west side of Delicias. About 30 miles south of Delicias, La Boquilla Reservoir holds back the Conchos River that begins in the highest parts of the heartland of the Sierra Madre Occidental. La Boquilla Reservoir, the largest dam in the state of Chihuahua, provides sustainable water supply to the valley along federal highway 45 including Delicias and the surrounding towns. In September 2008, La Boquilla Reservoir reached its maximum capacity. The western side of Delicias is dominated by the edge of the Sierra Madre Occidental mountain range that runs northwest to southeast. Southeast of the city the Sierra del Diablo mountain range runs southwest to northeast. Northeast of the city the dominant solonchaks and extreme arid conditions do not allow the land to be used for agriculture, but in the rest of the surrounding plains and mountains rich soils are found.

=== Climate ===
Delicias has a semi-arid climate (Köppen BWh), receiving only 334.2 millimetres (13.2 in) of rainfall per year. On average, Delicias observes 42 days of rain and a seven-month frost free period each year with a relative humidity of 45%. The prevalent winds come from the southwest. In the winter, days are mild and nights are cold with frequent frosts from November to February, while snowfall occurs once or twice a year. During spring, strong winds are common due to the last cold fronts from the north. In the summer months, days are hot and nights are warm with moderate rainfall by major thunderstorms.

Climate data for Delicias, Chihuahua (1991-2020)
| Month | Jan | Feb | Mar | Apr | May | Jun | Jul | Aug | Sep | Oct | Nov | Dec | Year |
|---|---|---|---|---|---|---|---|---|---|---|---|---|---|
| Record high °C (°F) | 32.0 (89.6) | 37.5 (99.5) | 38.0 (100.4) | 42.0 (107.6) | 46.5 (115.7) | 46.5 (115.7) | 43.0 (109.4) | 41.0 (105.8) | 41.0 (105.8) | 39.2 (102.6) | 37.5 (99.5) | 34.0 (93.2) | 46.5 (115.7) |
| Mean daily maximum °C (°F) | 20.4 (68.7) | 23.3 (73.9) | 26.5 (79.7) | 30.5 (86.9) | 34.1 (93.4) | 36.5 (97.7) | 34.2 (93.6) | 33.3 (91.9) | 31.3 (88.3) | 28.8 (83.8) | 24.0 (75.2) | 20.4 (68.7) | 28.6 (83.5) |
| Daily mean °C (°F) | 11.4 (52.5) | 13.9 (57.0) | 16.9 (62.4) | 20.8 (69.4) | 24.7 (76.5) | 28.0 (82.4) | 26.8 (80.2) | 26.1 (79.0) | 24.0 (75.2) | 20.2 (68.4) | 14.9 (58.8) | 11.2 (52.2) | 19.9 (67.8) |
| Mean daily minimum °C (°F) | 2.4 (36.3) | 4.5 (40.1) | 7.3 (45.1) | 11.2 (52.2) | 15.3 (59.5) | 19.4 (66.9) | 19.4 (66.9) | 18.8 (65.8) | 16.6 (61.9) | 11.6 (52.9) | 5.9 (42.6) | 2.1 (35.8) | 11.2 (52.2) |
| Record low °C (°F) | −13.0 (8.6) | −14.0 (6.8) | −8.0 (17.6) | −3.0 (26.6) | 1.5 (34.7) | 4.0 (39.2) | 6.0 (42.8) | 10.0 (50.0) | 2.0 (35.6) | −7.0 (19.4) | −9.0 (15.8) | −9.0 (15.8) | −14.0 (6.8) |
| Average precipitation mm (inches) | 8.9 (0.35) | 4.7 (0.19) | 4.8 (0.19) | 2.9 (0.11) | 10.2 (0.40) | 24.6 (0.97) | 65.5 (2.58) | 69.6 (2.74) | 39.8 (1.57) | 21.5 (0.85) | 12.6 (0.50) | 6.0 (0.24) | 271.1 (10.69) |
| Average precipitation days (≥ 0.1 mm) | 2.1 | 1.2 | 1.2 | 0.9 | 2.0 | 4.0 | 8.8 | 8.3 | 6.1 | 2.9 | 2.0 | 1.4 | 40.9 |
Source: Servicio Meteorológico National

== Economy ==
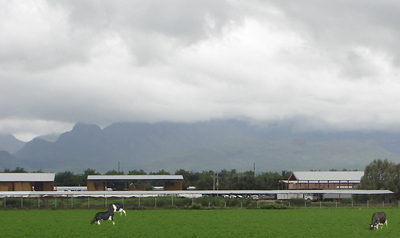
One of the many dairies outside of Delicias that are an important part of the agriculture sector.

Agriculture is so important to the municipality that it is known informally as the 'breadbasket' of the state, especially apiaries (the area produces a kind of honey known throughout northern Mexico). Delicias has a very diversified agriculture economy; the major crops include: pecans, chile, cotton, tomato, onion, and peanuts. Delicias is one of the most important dairy production areas in Mexico; the city hosts many modern dairy processors and dairy product manufactures. Delicias is home to Alpura, the second largest dairy in Mexico.

The economy is also dependent upon manufacturing, in the form of maquiladores. Delicias is also a major producer of wooden furniture with a national and international market. Delicias has major open air farm markets (Morelos Farm Market and Juarez Farm Market) and a shopping district located in North 3rd. Street (clothing, shoes, home goods, etc., known as "La Tercera". For decades the highschool and college students gathered in "La Tercera" as a social hangout. Delicias also has corporate chain franchised like Sam's, Soriana, Wal-Mart, Alsuper, Office Depot.

== Education and Culture ==
Delicias is home to a campus of the Universidad Autónoma de Chihuahua, which forms part of the state university system, the Instituto Tecnológico de Delicias (Technological Institute of Delicias) and a number of art, linguistic and technical secondary schools such as CEUN, Colegio La Roca, Preparatoria Federal por Cooperacion Activo 2030 Albert Einstein, Carson College, the Lincoln Institute, Sokhôl Dance School, the Madison School, Henry Ford Institute, the Michigan English Institute and the Culture House.

The Teatro de Delicias (Municipal Theatre) is known for its murals by Aarón Piña Mora, one of Mexico's renowned muralists and painters, it also built in reference to the "Las Virgenes" Dam located about 10 kilometers from Delicias.

== Notable people ==
- Fernando Baeza Meléndez, state governor
- Jahir Barraza, footballer
- Jesús Chávez, professional boxer
- Jesús Gardea, author
- Ed Maverick, singer
- Rodolfo Mijares, athlete
- Paul Moreno, footballer
- Martha Ramirez-Oropeza (born 1952), artist, researcher
- Gabriela Roel, actress
- Jorge A. Rojas, missionary
- Frank Corral, American football player

== Twin towns – sister cities ==
- Kerrville, Texas, United States
