= 9th federal electoral district of Chihuahua =

Federal electoral district of Mexico

Chihuahua's 9th
- Electoral district of the Chamber of Deputies of Mexico

- Chihuahua's 9th district since 2022

Incumbent
- Member: Noel Chávez Velázquez
- Party: ▌Institutional Revolutionary Party
- Congress: 66th (2024–2027)

District
- State: Chihuahua
- Head town: Parral
- Coordinates: 26°56′N 105°40′W
- Covers: 27 municipalities: Allende, Balleza, Batopilas, Bocoyna, Carichí, Coronado, Chínipas, Dr. Belisario Domínguez, Guachochi, Guadalupe y Calvo, Guazapares, Hidalgo del Parral, Huejotitán, López, Maguarichi, Matamoros, Morelos, Nonoava, Rosario, San Francisco de Borja, San Francisco del Oro, Santa Bárbara, Satevó, El Tule, Urique, Uruachi, Valle de Zaragoza
- PR region: First
- Precincts: 413
- Population: 378,424 (2020 census)

9th district in 2017–2022

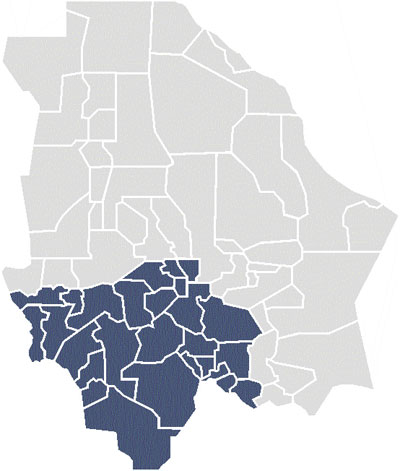
9th district in 2005–2017

The 9th federal electoral district of Chihuahua (Spanish: Distrito electoral federal 09 de Chihuahua) is one of the 300 electoral districts into which Mexico is divided for elections to the federal Chamber of Deputies and one of nine such districts in the state of Chihuahua.

It elects one deputy to the lower house of Congress for each three-year legislative session by means of the first-past-the-post system. Votes cast in the district also count towards the calculation of proportional representation ("plurinominal") deputies elected from the first region.

The 9th district was created as part of the 1977 electoral reforms. Under the 1975 districting plan, Chihuahua had only six congressional districts; with the 1977 reforms, the number increased to ten. The newly created district elected its first deputy in the 1979 mid-term election.

The current member for the district, elected in the 2024 general election, is Noel Chávez Velázquez of the Institutional Revolutionary Party (PRI).

== District territory ==
Under the 2023 districting plan adopted by the National Electoral Institute (INE), which is to be used for the 2024, 2027 and 2030 federal elections, the 9th district comprises 413 electoral precincts (secciones electorales) across 27 municipalities in the south of the state:

- Allende, Balleza, Batopilas, Bocoyna, Carichí, Coronado, Chínipas, Dr. Belisario Domínguez, Guachochi, Guadalupe y Calvo, Guazapares, Hidalgo del Parral, Huejotitán, López, Maguarichi, Matamoros, Morelos, Nonoava, Rosario, San Francisco de Borja, San Francisco del Oro, Santa Bárbara, Satevó, El Tule, Urique, Uruachi and Valle de Zaragoza.

The head town (cabecera distrital), where results from individual polling stations are gathered together and tallied, is the city of Parral. The district reported a population of 378,424 in the 2020 census.

== Previous districting schemes ==
Evolution of electoral district numbers
	1974	1978	1996	2005	2017	2023
Chihuahua	6	10	9	9	9	9
Chamber of Deputies	196	300				

2017–2022

Between 2017 and 2022, the district covered the municipalities of Allende, Balleza, Batopilas de Manuel Gómez Morín, Carichí, Coronado, Dr. Belisario Domínguez, Guachochi, Guadalupe y Calvo, Hidalgo del Parral, Huejotitán, López, Matamoros, Morelos, Nonoava, Rosario, San Francisco de Borja, San Francisco del Oro, Santa Bárbara, Satevó, El Tule, Urique and Valle de Zaragoza. The head town was at Parral.

2005–2017

Under the 2005 districting scheme, the district covered the state's southern municipalities of Balleza, Batopilas, Bocoyna, Carichi, Chínipas, Cusihuiriachi, Dr. Belisario Domínguez, Guachochi, Gran Morelos, Guadalupe y Calvo, Guazapares, Hidalgo del Parral, Huejotitán, Maguarichi, Matamoros, Morelos, Nonoava, Rosario, San Francisco de Borja, San Francisco del Oro, Santa Bárbara, Santa Isabel, Satevó, El Tule, Urique, Uruachi and Valle de Zaragoza. The head town was the city of Parral.

1996–2005

Chihuahua lost its 10th district in the 1996 redistricting process. Between 1996 and 2005, the 9th district covered the southern municipalities of Allende, Balleza, Coronado, Guadalupe y Calvo, Hidalgo del Parral, Huejotitán, Jiménez, López, Matamoros, Rosario, San Francisco del Oro, Santa Bárbara, El Tule and Valle de Zaragoza. Its head town was the city of Parral.

1978–1996

The districting scheme in force from 1978 to 1996 was the result of the 1977 electoral reforms, which increased the number of single-member seats in the Chamber of Deputies from 196 to 300. Under that plan, Chihuahua's seat allocation rose from six to ten. The new 9th district was located in the north-west of the state and its head town was the city of Nuevo Casas Grandes. It comprised the municipalities of Ahumada, Ascensión, Buenaventura, Casas Grandes, Galeana, Guadalupe, Ignacio Zaragoza, Janos, Madera, Nuevo Casas Grandes and Práxedis G. Guerrero.

== Deputies returned to Congress ==
(Mexico) National parties
- Current
- PAN
- PRI
- PT
- PVEM
- MC
- Morena
- PAZ
- Somos
- Defunct or local only
- PLM
- PNR
- PRM
- PNM
- PP
- PPS
- PARM
- PFCRN
- CON
- PANAL
- PSD
- PES
- PES
- PRD

Chihuahua's 9th district
Election	Deputy	Party	Term	Legislature
1979	Rebeca Anchondo Fernández	Institutional Revolutionary Party	1979–1982	51st Congress
1982	Servando Portillo Díaz	Institutional Revolutionary Party	1982–1985	52nd Congress
1985	Fernando Abarca Fernández	Institutional Revolutionary Party	1985–1988	53rd Congress
1988	Rebeca Anchondo Fernández	Institutional Revolutionary Party	1988–1991	54th Congress
1991	Luis Carlos Rentería Torres	Institutional Revolutionary Party	1991–1994	55th Congress
1994	Sergio Prieto Gamboa	Institutional Revolutionary Party	1994–1997	56th Congress
1997	Jesús José Villalobos Sáenz	Institutional Revolutionary Party	1997–2000	57th Congress
2000	Manuel Payán Nova	Institutional Revolutionary Party	2000–2003	58th Congress
2003	Jesús Aguilar Bueno (Note: Aguilar Bueno was originally elected for the Institutional Revolutionary Party but broke with the party towards the end of 59th Congress, along with other deputies with ties to the teaching profession affiliated with Elba Esther Gordillo, following her split with the PRI leadership.)	Institutional Revolutionary Party Independent politician	2003–2006	59th Congress
2006	César Duarte Jáquez	Institutional Revolutionary Party	2006–2009	60th Congress
2009	Luis Carlos Campos Villegas	Institutional Revolutionary Party	2009–2012	61st Congress
2012	Karina Velázquez Ramírez	Institutional Revolutionary Party	2012–2015	62nd Congress
2015	Carlos Hermosillo Arteaga (Note: Hermosillo Arteaga died in office on 20 March 2017. A warrant for the arrest of his alternate, Tarín García, was served before he could be sworn in.); Antonio Enrique Tarín García	Institutional Revolutionary Party	2015–2018	63rd Congress
2018	Ángeles Gutiérrez Valdez	National Action Party (Mexico)	2018–2020	64th Congress
2021	Ángeles Gutiérrez Valdez	National Action Party (Mexico)	2021–2024	65th Congress
2024	Noel Chávez Velázquez	Institutional Revolutionary Party	2024–2027	66th Congress

=== Congressional results ===
The corresponding page on the Spanish-language Wikipedia contains full electoral results from 1979 to 2021.

== Presidential elections ==
Chihuahua's 9th district
Election	District won by	Party or coalition	%
2018	Andrés Manuel López Obrador	Juntos Haremos Historia	29.1027
2024	Claudia Sheinbaum Pardo	Sigamos Haciendo Historia	45.6911
