= Chínipas =

Chínipas may mean:

- Chínipas de Almada, a town in the south-west of the Mexican state of Chihuahua
- Chínipas (municipality), the surrounding municipality
- Chinipa (people), the indigenous people of this region
- Chinipas River
