= César Duarte =

Mexican politician

César Duarte Jáquez
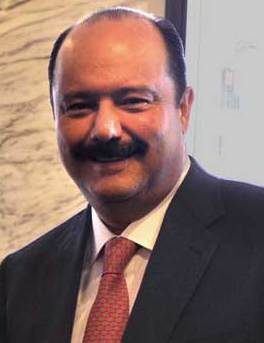

Governor of Chihuahua
- In office 4 October 2010 – 4 October 2016
- Preceded by: José Reyes Baeza Terrazas
- Succeeded by: Javier Corral Jurado

President of the Chamber of Deputies
- In office 1 September 2008 – 31 August 2009
- Preceded by: Ruth Zavaleta Salgado
- Succeeded by: Francisco Javier Ramírez Acuña

Deputy of the Congress of the Union for the 9th district of Chihuahua
- In office 1 September 2006 – 31 August 2009
- Preceded by: Jesús Aguilar Bueno
- Succeeded by: Luis Carlos Campos Villegas

Personal details
- Born: 14 April 1963 (age 63) Hidalgo del Parral, Chihuahua
- Party: PRI
- Spouse: Berta Olga Gomez Fong
- Profession: Lawyer

César Horacio Duarte Jáquez (born April 14, 1963) is a Mexican politician, a member of the Institutional Revolutionary Party, who has twice been a federal deputy. He was president of the Chamber of Deputies of Mexico from 2008 to 2009, while representing Chihuahua's ninth district, and he served as governor of Chihuahua for the period 2010 to 2016. Duarte is currently under investigation for corruption and an arrest warrant against him and other close members of his government was issued on March 27, 2017. According to the Financial Times in 2018, he was "believed to be in Texas". He was arrested in Miami, United States, in July 2020.

== Personal life and education ==
César Duarte Jáquez was born in Hidalgo de Parral, Chihuahua, in April 1963. He studied at the Universidad del Valle de México and became a lawyer.

== Career ==
Duarte Jáquez joined the Institutional Revolutionary Party (PRI) in 1977 and became a municipal and state advisor to PRI. He became general secretary and president of the municipality of Hidalgo del Parral.

He became head of the Confederación Nacional Campesina (National Farmers' Confederation) of Chihuahua and secretary of the organization's executive board.

Duarte Jáquez went on to become an at-large deputy in the Congress of Chihuahua (September 1, 2000 – August 31, 2003), deputy from the 9th District (September 1, 2006 – August 31, 2009), and president of the Chamber of Deputies (September 1, 2008 – August 31, 2009). He was governor of Chihuahua from October 4, 2010, to October 3, 2016, after which he was accused of peculation of MXN $275 million. He was expelled from PRI in January 2019.

His government investigated the 2013 Chihuahua monster truck accident.

== Accusations ==
Duarte Jáquez is accused of owning 50 different properties possibly acquired with public monies, with a value of US$200 million, in the United States. This is in addition to the 21 pieces of property—ranches, cattle, and machinery worth between MXN $1 billion and $1.2 billion—already seized in Mexico. The total fraud may amount to MXN $6 billion (US$267,500,000).

As of January 21, 2021, Duarte was being held in a prison in the U.S. state of Florida. Authorities and politicians (primarily members of the National Action Party in Chihuahua) would like to see him tried locally, particularly in light of accusations by Duarte's former Treasury Secretary, Jaime Herrera, revealed that he was personally responsible for handing out bribes to PRI loyalists.
