= El Tule =

El Tule may refer to:

- El Árbol del Tule, largest girth tree in the world, in Santa María del Tule, Oaxaca, Mexico
- El Tule, Chihuahua in El Tule Municipality, Chihuahua, Mexico
- El Tule Municipality, Chihuahua, Mexico
- El Tule, Zacatecas, Mexico
- El Tule a Latin group from Austin, TX
