= Chínipas River =

Large river of Mexico

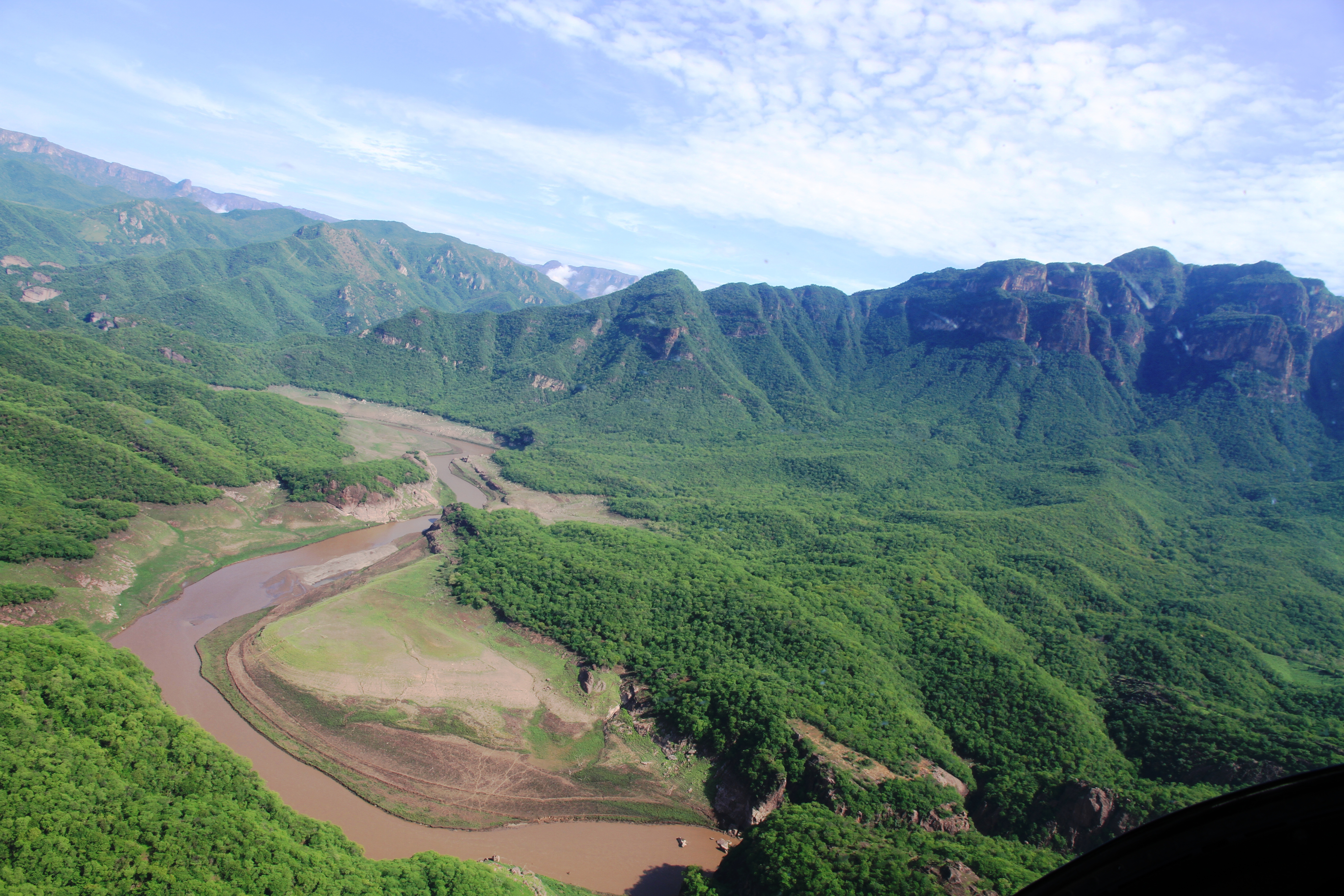

Location
- Country: Mexico
- States: Chihuahua and Sinaloa

Physical characteristics
- Mouth
  - elevation: Flows into the El Fuerte River in the waters of the Luis Donaldo Colosio Lake, also called the Huites Dam, at an elevation of 780 ft (240 m).

The Chínipas is a river of northwestern Mexico. The Chinipas arises deep in the Sierra Madre Occidental in the state of Chihuahua, and then flows through long rugged canyon systems into the state of Sinaloa until it finally joins the main trunk of the Fuerte River in the western foothills of the Sierra Madre Occidental. The Fuerte River then flows westward over the western coastal plain of Sonora to the Pacific Ocean, emerging very near the port of Topolobampo.

== Geography ==
The Chínipas River is the northwest most of the six rivers that make the six distinct extensive canyons in the Sierra Madre Occidental that are collectively referred to as the Copper Canyon area. All six rivers flow into the Fuerte River. Each of the six large rivers that flow into the Fuerte River have deep rugged canyons, and these canyons have many ravines and tributaries. Topographically the Copper Canyon region is a very rugged and remote area with few towns and few roads.

Going upstream from the Fuerte River on the Chinipas River, there is the town of Chinipas, Chihuahua and further upstream the town of Oteros, Chihuahua. The town of Uruachi, Chihuahua lies in a side canyon north of the Chinipas River. The mining town of Maguarichi, Chihuahua lies in another side canyon to the north of the Chinipas river.

The Oteros River is a major tributary of the Chinipas, entering the Chínipas River near the town of Oteros. The Chinipas and the Oteros Rivers each lie in deep canyons with many side ravines. After the two rivers are joined they continue in the large Chínipas/Oteros canyon, also having many side ravines.

The Canyon of the Chínipas/Otero is estimated to be 1600 meters or 5,250 feet deep.

== Flora and fauna ==
Low tropical deciduous forest covers the lower reaches of the canyon. Oak forests and woodlands cover the canyon slopes, and pine-oak forests cover the upper reaches of the river's watershed. The neotropical otter (Lontra longicaudis) lives in the river canyons.

The canyon of the Chínipas was identified as a priority for conservation by CONABIO, Mexico's government biodiversity agency, due to its biodiversity and the excellent state of conservation of the river, riparian forests, and forested slopes.

== Access and transportation ==
The drainage basin area of the canyons of the Chínipas River and the Oteros River and their tributaries is incised into the high plateau of the Sierra Madre Occidental. The entire road system in the Sierra Madre Occidental is minimal and undeveloped, but the Chínipas/Oteros River system may be accessed by four access zones. The first is the region between Creel and Divisadero. The second is by the mining town of Maguarichi which is not on the Chínipas River, but which is close to it. The third is by reaching the city of Uruachi, which lies in a smaller side canyon north of the Chínipas/Oteros canyon. A fourth access is a road that goes directly to the town of Chínipas on the river and the Chínipas/Oteros canyon, but this road is known to be difficult for its bad conditions.

Below the town of Chínipas, and only a short distance before the Chínipas flows into the Fuerte River is a tributary of the Chínipas River, which is the Septentrion River. The Ferrocarril Chihuahua al Pacífico (Chihuahua-Pacific Railway, also known as El Chepe from its reporting mark CHP) passes through this area. It crosses the Chínipas River near its junction with the Septentrion River, and then runs up the Septentrion canyon through the Sierra Madre Mountains.

Over the last 20 to 30 years, this general area in the Sierra Madre Occidental, along with other areas in the neighboring Mexican states of Sonora, Sinaloa and Durango, have been used extensively for the cultivation of various illegal drugs, and the area is also a corridor in which illegal drugs are transhipped north to the Mexican–American border. These activities have made this area increasingly dangerous for travel.

== See also ==
- List of rivers of Mexico
