= Antonio Tarín García =

Mexican politician (1976–2023)

- Born: Antonio Enrique Tarín García; 11 March 1976; Hidalgo del Parral, Chihuahua, Mexico
- Died: 7 April 2023 (aged 47); Chihuahua, Chihuahua, Mexico
- Education: ITESM
- Occupation: Politician
- Political party: PRI

Antonio Enrique Tarín García (11 March 1976 – 7 April 2023) was a Mexican politician affiliated with the Institutional Revolutionary Party (PRI). He held various positions in the government of Chihuahua and was the alternate federal deputy for Chihuahua's 9th district in the 2015–2018 period without ever taking office. On 7 May 2017, he was arrested for the crime of aggravated embezzlement; he was convicted and, some years later, released under house arrest.

== Political career ==
At the start of his term as governor of Chihuahua, César Duarte Jáquez appointed Tarín as director of Administration and Finance of the Chihuahua Health Institute in 2010, and on 30 October 2013, he became president of the Acquisitions and Services Committee of the State Treasury Department.

In 2015, Tarín requested a leave of absence from that position to contend for the PRI's nomination for alternate federal deputy for Chihuahua's 9th district. In the 2015 mid-term election, he was elected as Carlos Hermosillo Arteaga's alternate for the 2015–2018 session of Congress. Between the end of electoral campaigning and the start of the legislative session, he returned to his post in the Chihuahua state government until the end of the Duarte's term.

=== Accusations of corruption and substitution attempt ===
When Javier Corral Jurado of the National Action Party (PAN) assumed the position of governor in 2016, Tarín was accused of corruption and mismanagement of public resources, in particular of diverting funds to shell companies created by himself, including one called FRITAG.

Hermosillo Arteaga was killed in a car accident on 20 March 2017, and Tarín attempted to assume the now vacant congressional seat. Eight days later, he tried to take the oath of office as a deputy before the Chamber of Deputies, which would have granted him parliamentary immunity against any arrest warrants issued against him. When an arrest warrant issued against him the same day by the Chihuahua prosecutor's office was served before he could be sworn in, a confrontation arose between the parliamentary factions of the PRI and its opponents from the PAN, PRD, and MORENA. After negotiations, the PRI announced that his swearing-in would be postponed until his legal situation was clarified.

Consequently, and to avoid being arrested by the police officers who were waiting for him outside the Congress building, he remained sheltered there throughout the night until he received an injunction that suspended the arrest warrant against him, after which he finally left the Legislative Palace of San Lázaro. After these events, Tarín stated that he was innocent of the accusations and was being politically persecuted by the government of Chihuahua.

=== Incarceration ===
On 7 May 2017, Tarín was arrested in a rented apartment in Mexico City on fresh charges of aggravated embezzlement unrelated to those for which the federal judge had issued the injunction. He was subsequently transferred to Chihuahua and was indicted on 6 June. On 19 July 2019 he was found guilty of embezzling 2,420,000 pesos and sentenced to six years' incarceration. On 20 December 2021, a judge changed the conditions of Tarín's prison sentence, granting him house arrest and the use of a locator bracelet.

=== Death ===
On 7 April 2023, Tarín died at age 47 when he jumped from a vehicular bridge in the city of Chihuahua. He was identified by the locator bracelet he was still wearing.
