= Carlos Hermosillo Arteaga =

Mexican politician

- Born: 2 May 1977; Hidalgo del Parral, Chihuahua, Mexico
- Died: 20 March 2017 (aged 39); Hidalgo del Parral, Chihuahua, Mexico
- Occupation: Politician
- Political party: Institutional Revolutionary Party (PRI)

Carlos Hermosillo Arteaga (Note: In this Mexican name, the surname is Hermosillo and the second or maternal family name is Arteaga.) (2 May 1977 – 20 March 2017) was a Mexican politician from the Institutional Revolutionary Party (PRI). He served as a federal deputy during the 63rd session of Congress, representing Chihuahua's ninth district. He was described as the "right-hand man" of Chihuahua governor César Duarte during his 2010–2016 governorship.

== Life ==
Hermosillo Arteaga was born in Hidalgo del Parral and obtained his degree in business administration from the Instituto Tecnológico de Parral in 2001. His first jobs were at Telecomm-Telégrafos in its Parral division; he became the statewide coordinator in 2006, after two years spent away from the agency in which he served as César Duarte's private secretary and chauffeur.

In 2011, Hermosillo was named director of the State Trust Fund for the Promotion of Productive Activities in Chihuahua (Fideapech), which provides funds to small businesses in the state. After a year at Fideapech, he became the Director General of Administration in the state's finance secretariat. From 2013 to 2015, Hermosillo served as the president of the Central Board of Water and Sanitation of the State of Chihuahua.

During his time in the state administration, Hermosillo acquired several properties, including a home worth 2.8 million pesos in the wealthy Misión del Bosque neighborhood of Chihuahua, as well as three other transactions in the span of two months. Some of the homes were registered in the name of his wife, Mayra Julieta Urbina Arzola. In December 2016, he appeared before a judge in a legal case against him for unlawful enrichment; the judge ordered the case reopened after the Duarte government closed it in its final week. By this time, he and his wife had six properties in their name in Chihuahua, worth a combined 14 million pesos.

=== Election as federal deputy ===
In the 2015 mid-term elections, Hermosillo Arteaga received the PRI nomination for federal deputy to run in Chihuahua's 9th federal electoral district, which includes Parral. He won the election and served on three commissions: Cooperative Development and Social Economy, Communications, and Ranching.

=== Death ===
Hermosillo Arteaga died on 20 March 2017 in a car accident on the highway between Parral and Chihuahua. A trailer blew a tire and collided against the pickup truck he was driving, causing him to lose control and be flung out the windshield. A piece of the rim of the blown tire became lodged in his body. Though he was able to pull the truck off the road and avoid further problems, he died hours later at the general hospital of Parral. At the time of his death, he had four children between the ages of 8 and 14.
