= Miroslava Breach =

Mexican crime journalist and murder victim (1962–2017)

Miroslava Breach Velducea
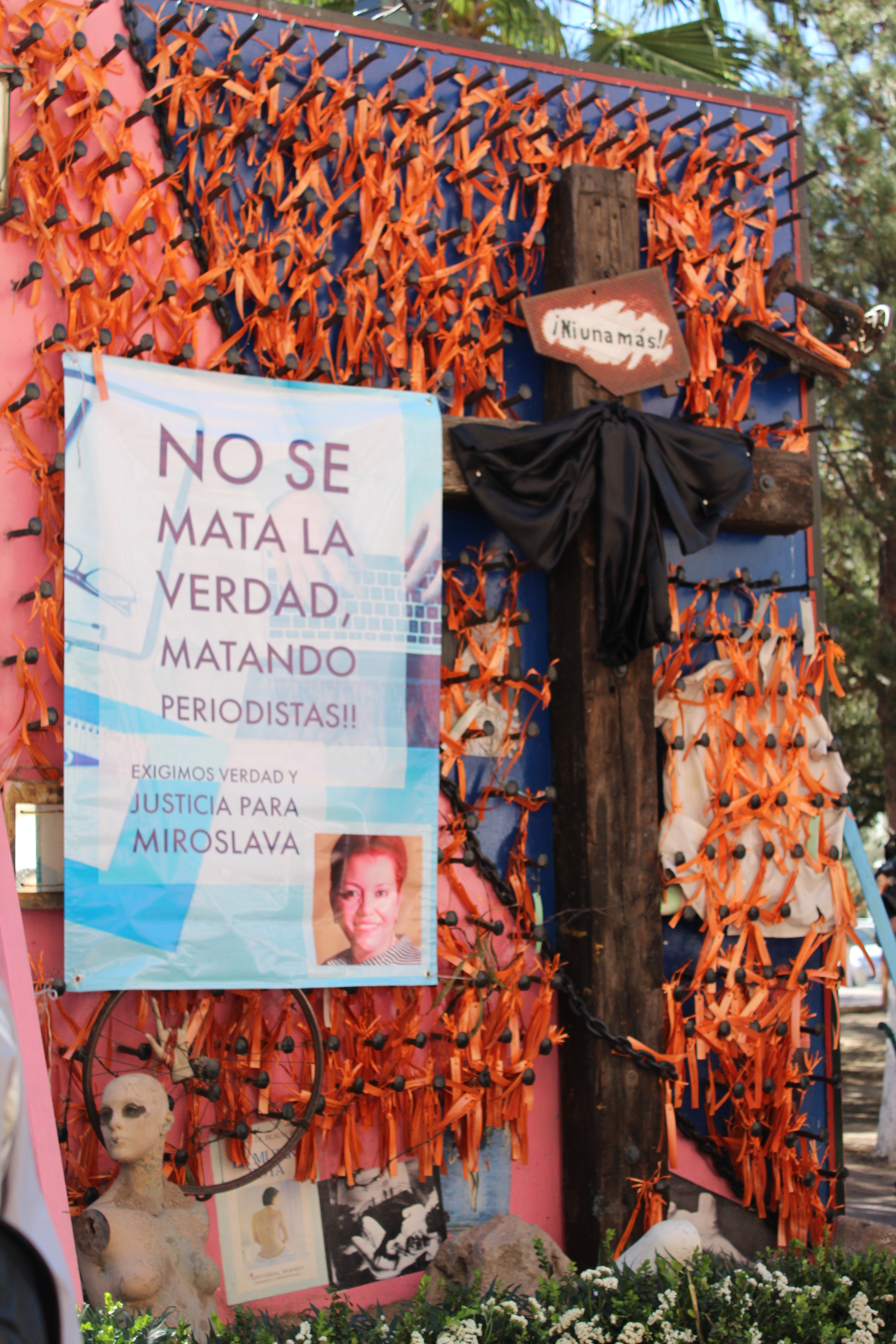
- Homage at the Cruz de Clavos to the memory of Miroslava Breach days after her assassination.
- Born: 7 August 1962; Chínipas de Almada, Chihuahua, Mexico
- Died: 23 March 2017 (aged 54); Chihuahua City, Chihuahua, Mexico
- Cause of death: Homicide
- Education: Autonomous University of Baja California Sur (Political science)
- Occupation: Journalist
- Years active: 1987–2017
- Employer: La Jornada
- Known for: Investigative reporting on crime and corruption
- Awards: Don Bolles Medal

Miroslava Breach Velducea (7 August 1962 – 23 March 2017) was a Mexican investigative journalist for La Jornada and Norte de Juárez in Chihuahua City, Mexico known for her reporting on human rights violations, drug trafficking, and government corruption. She was murdered on 23 March 2017 as she was leaving her home. She was one of six journalists killed in Mexico in 2017.

At the time of her death, Breach was a correspondent for La Jornada, a collaborator for El Norte de Chihuahua newspaper, and the editorial director of El Norte de Ciudad Juárez. She was a single mother of 2 children.

== Personal ==
Miroslava Breach Velducea was born on 7 August 1962 in Chínipas in the Sierra Tarahumara region of the Mexican state of Chihuahua. She attended grade school in Los Mochis, Sinaloa, and junior high and high school in Navojoa, Sonora. Breach's father died when she was young, and she was raised by her siblings and single mother. After high school, she moved to La Paz, Baja California Sur and enrolled at the Autonomous University of Baja California Sur. She first studied biological sciences for two years, after which she transferred to the Faculty of Political Science and Public Administration. She graduated in 1987.

== Career ==
After graduation, Breach worked for two local newspapers in Los Cabos. Between 1989 and 1992, she was director of Social Communication of the Municipality of Los Cabos. At the age of 34, Breach left Los Cabos and relocated to Chihuahua City with her daughter Andrea following a failed marriage. There, she worked for El Heraldo de Chihuahua, El Diario de Chihuahua, El Norte de Ciudad Juárez, and then became a correspondent for the newspaper La Jornada in May 1997. She founded the MIR news agency.

On 4 March 2016, La Jornada published a piece by Breach that exposed that cartel members had infiltrated mayoral candidate lists for the Institutional Revolutionary and National Action parties in rural, mountainous drug corridors of Chihuahua.

Breach investigated issues such as human rights violations and illegal logging in Rarámuri communities in the Sierra Tarahumara region; environmental damage in the region; female homicides in Ciudad Juárez; the murder of Marisela Escobedo Ortiz; and forced disappearances and drug trafficking in Chihuahua. She also exposed the extensive corruption in the government of former Governor of Chihuahua César Duarte Jáquez. On 5 November 2016, she announced that in six years of government, Duarte had operated a private network of friends and family that embezzled 900 million pesos. Affronted, Mexican President Peña Nieto pledged to send Duarte to prison.

One of Breach's most important exposures was that of the Mexican Attorney General's investigation into the existence of clandestine graves being used in El Largo Maderal. Her research revealed that Sergio Almaráz Ortiz, Secretary of Public Safety in Ciudad Juárez, had failed the security tests from the National Public Security System; this later led to his removal from office. A 5 June 2016 article by Breach stated that members of organized crime were attempting to enter politics through drug trafficking corridors, notably through the Institutional Revolutionary Party (PRI) and National Action Party (PAN).

During the presidency of Felipe Calderón (2006–2012), Breach documented the escalating violence in Chihuahua as it became a battleground between the Sinaloa and Juárez Cartels. Beginning in August 2016, she reported on the displacement of indigenous peoples in Chihuahua by organized crime, namely by a group called "Los Salazares" that she believed was also tied to illegal logging. As a result of her work, Breach and her family received death threats.

== Death ==
Chihuahua City is shown here relative to the capital, Mexico City.

On 23 March 2017 at 7:06 a.m. CST, Breach was shot eight times by a gunman at the intersection of Rio Aros and José María Mata as she drove her Renault Duster SUV away from her home in the Granjas neighborhood, Chihuahua City to take her 14-year-old son to school. The perpetrators had shot her with 9 mm rounds. Carlos was not injured, but Breach died on the way to hospital. La Jornada reported that a cardboard note reading, "For being a snitch. You're next Governor. -El 80," was found at the scene of the murder. "El 80" was identified as Carlos Arturo Quintana, son of César Raúl Gamboa Sosa (who had been killed three days before Breach's murder) and leader of the crime syndicate La Línea, a division of the Juárez Cartel.

Hours after the murder, César Augusto Peniche Espejel, head of the State Prosecutor's Office (FGE), said that Breach had "not requested protection as there was no clear evidence of her being threatened", despite evidence to the contrary. Governor Javier Corral Jurado and his private secretary Francisco Muñoz visited Breach's children to comfort them and declared a three-day mourning period for her. Breach's body was taken to the Forensic Medical Service of Ciudad Juárez for autopsy.

Governor Corral said that Breach had not reported receiving any threats, despite also saying that she had received threats on her life two years prior to her murder. According to family members, Breach had recently been feeling "very uncomfortable" and would not confide the threats to the State Prosecutor. Corral also stated that Breach's family members were already receiving security from the Mexican state.

A month after Breach's murder, her sister, Rosa María, implored authorities to spare little expense to acquire justice for Miroslava.

=== Investigation ===
On 17 April 2017, Governor Corral announced that the perpetrators who had killed Breach had been identified, but not yet apprehended.

On 11 October 2017, Corral confirmed information that had leaked that day to the press by declaring that the police investigation into Breach's murder had determined that the criminal organization "Los Salazares", a division of Gente Nueva, an armed wing of the Sinaloa Cartel, had masterminded the killings. The motive for the killing was likely revenge for Breach's exposing of then-Chínipas de Almada mayoral candidate Juan Miguel Salazar's alleged connections to the Sinaloa Cartel via La Jornada, causing him to lose the election to another cartel candidate. Breach reported that following the publication of this story, she began to receive death threats. Also on 11 October, Breach's sister Rosa María Breach Velducea appeared in public on the six-month anniversary of the assassination to condemn the killing.

El Heraldo de Chihuahua reported the shooter to be the nephew of Crispín and Adán Salazar, acting on the orders of his uncle, Juan Miguel Salazar. The assailant arrived at the scene in a silver 2008 Chevrolet Malibu. Federal agents pored through video footage to trace the route of the vehicle and the assailant's escape in a getaway car driven by two other yet unidentified men.

During the investigation of Breach's murder, an audio recording of Breach speaking to a PAN spokesperson was discovered on the computer of Jasiel Vega Villa, a suspect connected to Breach's murder, that confirmed her reportage of collusion between organized crime and local politicians in Chihuahua. On the tape, the spokesperson demanded to know Breach's source(s) for a 4 March 2016 article that effectively ended the candidacy of Juan Miguel Salazar, Adán Salazar's uncle, for a PRI-held Chínipas and Bachíniva, forcing the party to exchange Salazar for another candidate, as Los Salazares held the PAN accountable. Breach refused to disclose a source, alleging that she came to her own conclusions and confirmed to the spokesperson that she had not met with the PAN mayor of Chínipas at the time, Hugo Amed Schultz, about Salazar. She also revealed that her uncles had been issued death threats, and declared that "if they are going to kill someone it should be the reporter." Breach had previously accused Schultz of protecting Los Salazares, and he did not help his case when he delivered the audiotape to Los Salazares to clear his name. The tape was presented as evidence at the hearing of Juan Carlos Moreno Ochoa, captured on 25 December 2017 in Bacobampo, Sonora, for his role in Breach's murder, and the prosecutors established that he oversaw the murder, committed by Ramón Andrés Zavala Corral, who was killed himself near Chínipas on 19 December. It is believed that Moreno Ochoa had planned on killing Breach as a birthday gift for Adán Salazar Zamorano, leader of Los Salazares.

In April 2018, the judicial branch of the State of Chihuahua closed their investigation and gave the Attorney General the case file. It was decided that Moreno Ochoa would be tried in Federal court. In August 2020, he was sentenced to 50 years in prison.

== Context ==
Breach's murder came at a time of intense dissatisfaction by the people of Chihuahua with the PAN government of the State of Chihuahua. Chihuahuans, who believed that César Duarte Jáquez had not been sufficiently punished and were upset that Governor Corral had been on vacation in Mazatlán only two days before, began to demand justice for Breach and the many other journalists who had been killed in Chihuahua. At Corral's 23 March 2017 press conference, the assembled press were informed that the investigation would primarily use the work of Breach and that other journalists were welcome to join the investigation.

Breach's murder came a week after the murder of Veracruz journalist Ricardo Monlui Cabrera and a few weeks after the murder of Cecilio Pineda Birto in Guerrero. According to the NGO Article 19, since the start of Peña Nieto's government in December 2012, through 19 March 2017, 106 Mexican journalists had been killed. Of those cases, 99.75% remain unsolved. In response to the government's failure to investigate and prosecute these cases, protests sprang up across Mexico to demand justice for Breach and the other journalists in the days following Breach's murder.

== Impact ==
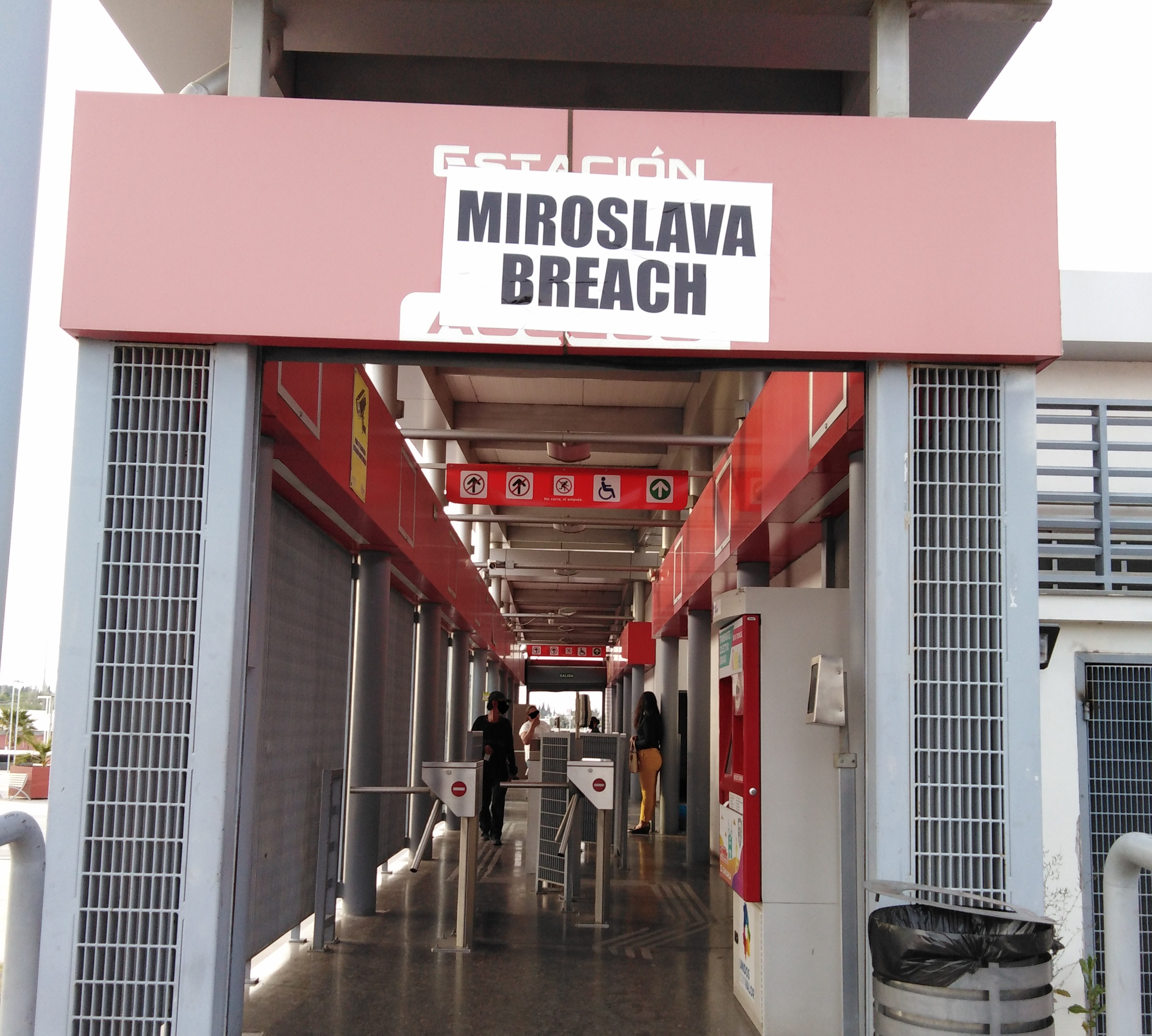
Bowí bus station 'Justice' in Chihuahua City renamed 'Miroslava Breach', on March 23, 2019, 2 years after her femicide .

The Miroslava Breach Award was established in 2017 by several educational institutions, as well as journals and newspapers, in Breach's honor for Latin American or Caribbean journalists who publish about violence and education or journalism.

In Chihuahua City, friends and relatives of Breach as well as other journalists and their friends and family are to gather to demand justice for Breach, beginning at 07:00 CST 22 March 2018 at the Quinta Gameros. The next day, the one-year anniversary of Breach's murder, they will reconvene at Hidalgo Plaza's Cruz de Clavos in front of the Palace of the State Governor, and then finish on the 24th with a research seminar at the Autonomous University of Chihuahua named in honor of Breach.

Miroslava's work has been continued by Forbidden Stories.

== See also ==
- Javier Valdez Cárdenas
- List of journalists and media workers killed in Mexico
- Mexican drug war
