= Francisco de Borja (disambiguation) =

Francisco de Borja (1441–1511) was a Spanish cardinal.

Francisco de Borja may also refer to:

== People ==
- Francisco Galcerán de Lloris y de Borja (1470–1506), Catalan cardinal
- Francis Borgia (1510–1572), duke of Gandia and Catholic saint
- Francisco de Borja y Aragón (1581–1658), viceroy of Peru
- Francisco de Borja y Miguel (1629–1689), bishop of Tucumán and Trujillo
- Francisco de Borja y Poyo (1733–1808), Captain general of the Spanish Navy
- Francisco de Borja Álvarez de Toledo, 12th Marquis of Villafranca (1763–1821)
- Francisco de Borja Fernández (1789–1869), Argentine judge and legislator
- Francisco de Borja Solar (1807–1891), Chilean politician and Minister of Finance
- Francisco de Borja Queipo de Llano, 8th Count of Toreno (1840–1890), Spanish historian and politician
- Francisco de Borja Echeverría (1848–1904), Chilean Conservative Party deputy and diplomat
- Francisco de Borja Valdés (1851–1929), Chilean politician and Minister of Public Works
- Francisco de Borja Valenzuela Ríos (1917–1998), Chilean bishop
- Francisco de Borja-Pérez Peñas (born 1982), Spanish footballer

== Places ==
- San Francisco de Borja Municipality, Chihuahua, Mexico
- San Francisco de Borja, seat of San Francisco de Borja Municipality
