= San Francisco Javier de Satevó =

Town in the Mexican state of Chihuahua

- Municipal seat
- Location in Mexico San Francisco Javier de Satevó (Chihuahua)
- Coordinates: 27°57′15″N 106°6′23″W
- Country: Mexico
- State: Chihuahua
- Municipality: Satevó
- Mission founded: 1640

Population (2010)
  - Total: 445

San Francisco Javier de Satevó (frequently apocopated to Satevó) is a town in the Mexican state of Chihuahua. It serves as the municipal seat for the surrounding municipality of Satevó.

As of 2010, the town had a total population of 445, down from 450 as of 2005.

== History ==
San Francisco Javier de Satevó was founded as a mission by the Jesuit missionary José Pascual in 1640. The mission was, however, destroyed in a Tarahumara revolt in 1652 and not rebuilt until 1674 under Fr. Juan Sarmiento.

Fidel Ávila, Governor of Chihuahua in 1914 and 1915, was born in San Francisco Javier de Satevó in 1875.

On 24 December 1918, General Francisco Villa, at the head of a column of some 900 men of the División del Norte, attacked San Francisco Javier de Satevó. The settlement's defence, comprising 70 men under Pedro Alonso, refused to yield. The Villistas gradually forced back the defenders into the parish church, to which they set fire before sacking the village.
