= Mission San Francisco Borja =

Mission San Francisco Borja can refer to:

- Misión San Francisco Borja, in Baja California
- Mission San Francisco de Borja, in Chihuahua
