= Jesús Aguilar (disambiguation) =

Jesús Aguilar may refer to:

- Jesús Aguilar (born 1990), Venezuelan baseball player
- Jesús Aguilar Bueno (born 1968), Mexican politician
- Jesús Aguilar Padilla (1952–2023), Mexican politician
- Jesús Aguilar Paz (1895–1974), Honduran chemist
