= Coat of arms of Chihuahua =

Coat of Arms of Chihuahua
- Adopted: 20 January 1983 (by José María Ponce de León)

The Coat of arms of Chihuahua (Spanish: Escudo de Chihuahua, lit. "state shield of Chihuahua") is a symbol of the Free and Sovereign State of Chihuahua in Mexico. Was adopted in 20 January 1983.

== Symbolism ==
The coat of arms of the state of Chihuahua is of the Gothic ogival type, that is, ending in a point, which is unusual in the states of the country. It is composed of a red border in which at the top reads "Estado de Chih", acronym for the State of Chihuahua and on the sides, the entity's motto, "Courage, Loyalty, Hospitality", in silver letters. The same apple blossom at each of the upper ends. The main body of the shield is divided into three asymmetrical parts, separated from each other and from the border by a strip of laurel leaves (green). The upper part shows on the blue background of the sky and the three hills that dominate the landscape of the city of Chihuahua, capital of the state, which are El Coronel, Santa Rosa and Grande in their natural color, and the foreground from left to right a mine winch, a section of the Aqueduct of the state capital and a mesquite tree.The central part is divided into sixteen pieces, eight silver and eight gules, which represent the votes for and against that were cast to found the city of Chihuahua in 1709 and that resulted in a tie, and above them are the Profile faces of a Spanish conquistador and a Tarahumara Indian facing each other. At the bottom, in blue, the front of the Chihuahua cathedral in gold.

== History ==
The State of Chihuahua did not have an official coat of arms, and because the one designed by Don José María Ponce de León, painted by the Chihuahuan Raúl López on the walls of the Ministry of Public Education, in the Federal District, although it was placed there by orders of Minister José Vasconcelos, it was never recognized as an official shield that identified the State of Chihuahua.

On the other hand, the constant use of the coat of arms of the City of Chihuahua, as the coat of arms of the State, became traditional for the people of Chihuahua and on January 20, 1983, the State Executive presented a draft decree before the State Congress, with the aim of that the shield of the Municipality of Chihuahua be adopted in its entirety, replacing only the upper part of the legend "SN PHE EL RL. DE CHIH.", for "ESTADO DE CHIHUAHUA."

First Coat of arms.

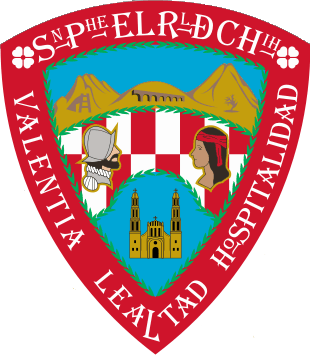
Coat of arms from 1983.

== See also ==
- Chihuahua
- Coat of arms of Mexico
- Symbols of Chihuahua City
