= Abraham González (governor) =

Mexican politician (1864–1913)

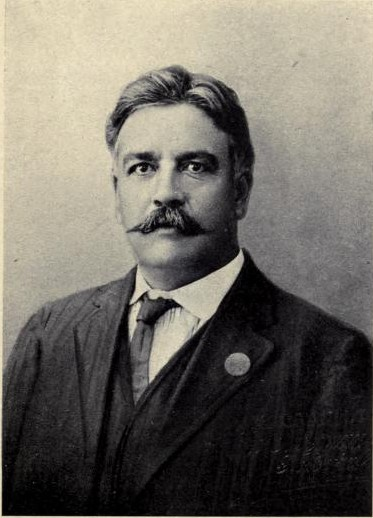
Governor Abraham González

Abraham González de Hermosillo y Casavantes (June 7, 1864 – March 7, 1913) was the provisional and constitutional governor of the Mexican state of Chihuahua during the early period of the Mexican Revolution. He was the political mentor of the revolutionary Pancho Villa, whom he had met and befriended before the revolution.

== Family ==
Abraham González de Hermosillo y Casavantes was born on his family's estates in Basúchil, in Guerrero Municipality, Chihuahua. He was a member of one of the richest and best-educated families in the state (the González de Hermosillo family was believed to be descended from European nobility). He was educated at the University of Notre Dame, in South Bend, Indiana. His paternal line is from Teocaltiche, Jalisco, belonging to the González de Hermosillo y Gómez Rendón family with Y-DNA matches with other González de Hermosillo families of Jalisco.

As with Francisco Madero, the scion of one of the richest landowning families in Coahuila and also educated abroad, Abraham González had suffered under the favoritism of Porfirio Díaz's political system. In Chihuahua, the dominant political clique was the Creel-Terrazas family, which had vast land holdings and strong political connections to Díaz. González "was unable to hold out against the competition of the large haciendas, primarily those belonging to the Terrazas-Creel clan." After Madero wrote his book, The Presidential Succession of 1910 and the political movement of elites against Díaz's election grew, González became the head of the Anti-Re-electionist Club in Chihuahua.

== Political career ==
González was one of the main leaders of the Maderista Junta Revolucionaria Mexicana, the movement which opposed the re-election of dictator Porfirio Díaz in 1910. González was president of the Benito Juárez Anti-Re-electionist Club and met with Francisco Madero in Chihuahua. At the time, Madero had not yet chosen his running mate, and when González asked who he preferred, Madero said Francisco Vázquez Gómez. González declared for Vázquez Gómez. When Madero issued his Plan de San Luis Potosí, calling for rebellion against Díaz after the fraudulent 1910 election, he counted on González, among others, to rise up.

During the early phases of the Revolution, González was appointed provisional governor of the State of Chihuahua in October 1910 by Francisco Madero. After the success of the Madero revolution in 1911, González was appointed interim governor in June 1911, pending elections. He was elected governor in his own right in August 1911.

In October 1911, González obtained a leave of absence, approved by the Chihuahua legislature, from the office of governor so that he could serve on Madero's cabinet in Mexico City. On November 6, 1911, he was sworn in as the Minister of Internal Affairs (Secretaría de Gobernación). As one of the Madero cabinet ministers who had served in the revolution against Díaz, González was a target of the conservative press. He served in this capacity until February 1912, when he returned to Chihuahua due to the seriousness of the Pascual Orozco rebellion against Madero. He served as governor of the state until his arrest and murder by officials of the Victoriano Huerta regime in March 1913.

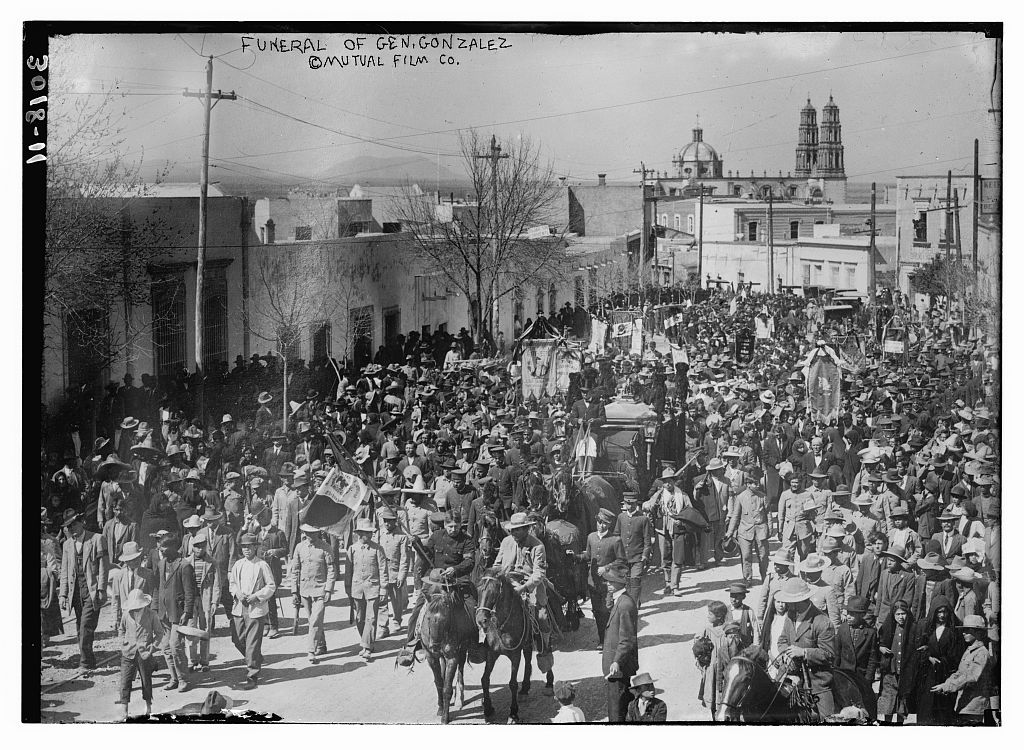
González's funeral, organized by Pancho Villa and filmed (by arrangement with Villa) by the Mutual Film Corporation

== Death ==
After the assassination of President Francisco Madero and Vice-President José María Pino Suárez during La decena trágica, González was forced to resign from his post as governor and arrested on February 25, 1913, on orders of General Antonio Rábago, a subordinate of Victoriano Huerta. During González's incarceration he was held in the same complex in the Federal Palace of Chihuahua that had housed Miguel Hidalgo y Costilla prior to his execution a century earlier, during the war for Mexico's independence. On 7 March, he was taken aboard a train on the pretense of being transferred to Mexico City. He was then removed from the train and murdered in Bachimba Canyon, about 40 miles (64 km) south of Chihuahua, on direct orders from Huerta, who had been responsible for ordering the murders of Madero and Pino Suárez in order to assume power.

His nephew, Colonel Fernando González y González, along with Pancho Villa, later recovered González's remains and gave him a hero's funeral in the city of Chihuahua. He is buried in the Rotunda of Illustrious Chihuahuans under the Angel of Liberty monument in the Plaza Mayor in Chihuahua City.

Preceded by Miguel Ahumada	Governor of Chihuahua; 1911 - 1913	Succeeded by Antonio Rábago
