= Carichí Municipality =

Municipality in the Mexican state of Chihuahua

Carichí
- Municipality
- Municipality of Carichí in Chihuahua

- Location in Mexico
- Coordinates: 27°55′N 107°03′W
- Country: Mexico
- State: Chihuahua
- Municipal seat: Carichí

Area
  - Total: 2,782 km^{2} (1,074 sq mi)

Population (2010)
  - Total: 8,795

Carichí is one of the 67 municipalities of Chihuahua, in northern Mexico. The municipal seat lies at Carichí. The municipality covers an area of 2,782 km^{2}.

As of 2010, the municipality had a total population of 8,795, up from 7,944 as of 2005.

As of 2010, the town of Carichí had a population of 1,672. Other than the town of Carichí, the municipality had 315 localities, none of which had a population over 1,000.

== Geography ==
=== Towns and villages ===
| Village | Population (2005) |
|---|---|
| Total Municipality | 8,377 |
| Carichí | 1,478 |
| Ciénega de Ojos Azules | 649 |
| Tajirachi | 342 |
