= Huejotitán Municipality =

Municipality in the Mexican state of Chihuahua

Huejotitán
- Municipality
- Municipality of Huejotitán in Chihuahua

- Location in Mexico
- Coordinates: 27°23′21″N 106°10′45″W
- Country: Mexico
- State: Chihuahua
- Municipal seat: Huejotitán
- Founded: November 21, 1844

Area
  - Total: 484.8 km^{2} (187.2 sq mi)

Population (2010)
  - Total: 1,049

Huejotitán is one of the 67 municipalities of Chihuahua, in northern Mexico. The municipal seat lies at Huejotitán. The municipality covers an area of 484.8 km^{2}.

As of 2010, the municipality had a total population of 1,049, up from 1,036 as of 2005.

The municipality had 51 localities, none of which had a population over 1,000.

== Geography ==
=== Towns and villages ===
The municipality has 40 localities. The largest are:

| Name | Population (2005) |
|---|---|
| Huejotitán | 244 |
| Pichague | 147 |
| Total Municipality | 1,036 |
