= Uruachi Municipality =

Municipality in the Mexican state of Chihuahua

Uruachi
- Municipality
- Municipality of Uruachi in Chihuahua

- Location in Mexico
- Coordinates: 27°52′02″N 108°12′57″W
- Country: Mexico
- State: Chihuahua
- Municipal seat: Uruachi
- Founded: November 21, 1844

Area
  - Total: 3,058.31 km^{2} (1,180.82 sq mi)

Population (2010)
  - Total: 8,200
  - Density: 2.7/km^{2} (6.9/sq mi)

Uruachi is one of the 67 municipalities of Chihuahua, in northern Mexico. The municipal seat lies at Uruachi. The municipality covers an area of 3,058.31 km^{2}.

As of 2010, the municipality had a total population of 8,200, up from 7,934 as of 2005.

As of 2010, the town of Uruachi had a population of 1,199. Other than the town of Uruachi, the municipality had 422 localities, none of which had a population over 1,000.

== Geography ==
=== Towns and villages ===
The municipality has 268 localities. The largest are:

Name	Population (2005)
Uruachi	806
Gasogachi	316
El Rebaje	248
Jicamorachi	240
Arechuyvo	210
Total Municipio	7,934

== History ==
Five residents of Santísimo de Abajo were shot and killed and their vehicle was burned on January 31, 2021.
