= Miguel Ahumada =

Mexican politician

Miguel Ahumada Sauceda
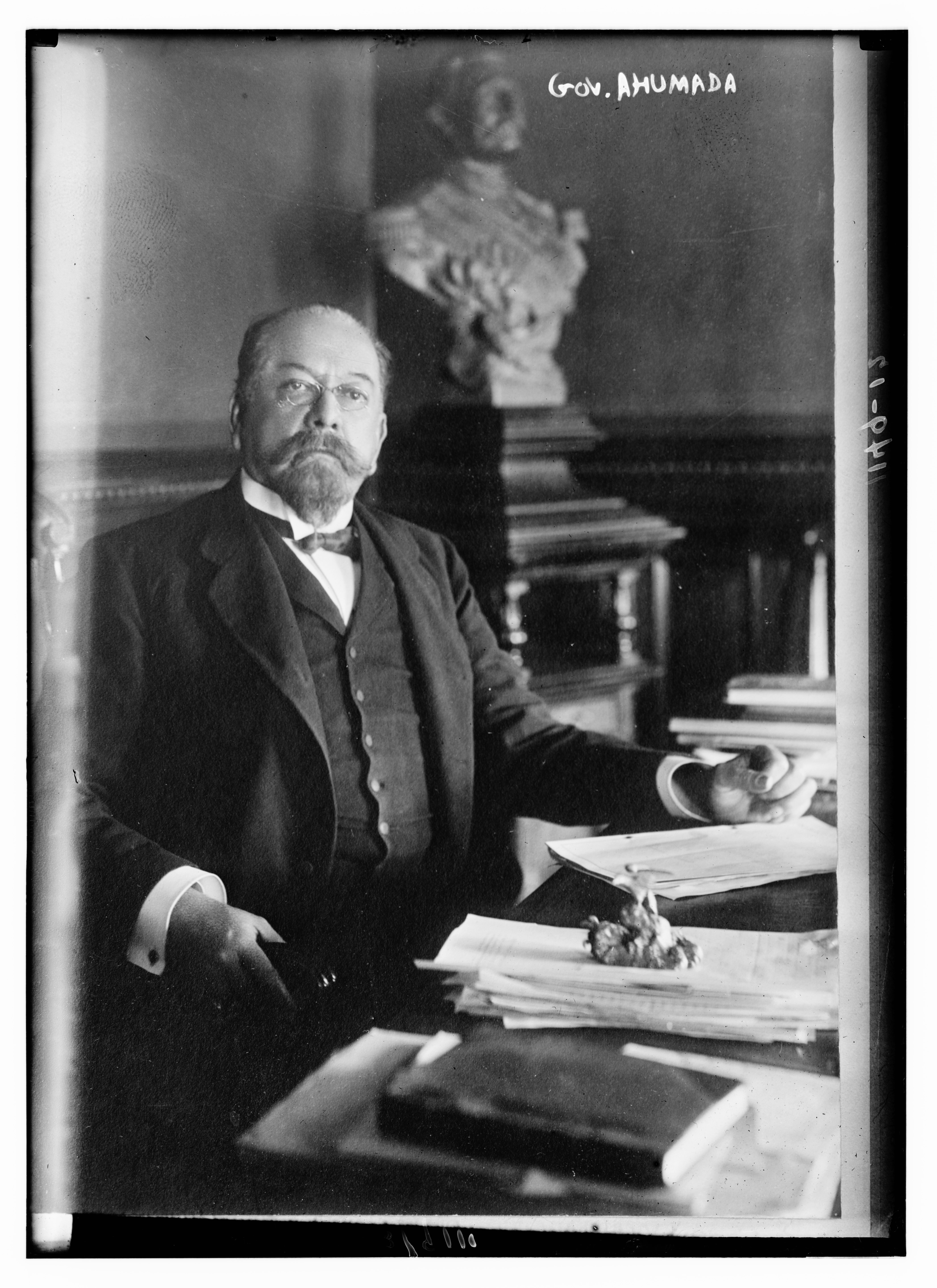

Governor of Chihuahua
- In office October 4, 1892 – February 27, 1903
- Preceded by: Rafael Pimentel
- Succeeded by: Joaquín Cortázar

Governor of Jalisco
- In office March 1, 1903 – January 25, 1911
- Preceded by: Luis del Carmen Curiel
- Succeeded by: Juan R. Zavala

Governor of Chihuahua
- In office January 31, 1911 – June 1910
- Preceded by: Alberto Terrazas Cuilty
- Succeeded by: Abraham González

Personal details
- Born: 1844; Colima
- Died: 1917; El Paso, Texas
- Political party: Active and Progressive
- Profession: Governor, soldier, and carpenter

Miguel Ahumada Sauceda (1844–1917) served as the Governor of Chihuahua and Jalisco.

Born in the state of Colima on September 29, 1844, in his youth he worked as a carpenter and in customs inspection. He fought against the Imperialist government of Maximilian I; initially under the command of General Ramón Corona and then under Sóstenes Rocha. He was a political prefect, a local deputy, and a commander of arms in Colima. He subsequently was assigned to the Marine Reserve Command in Guaymas, Sonora and three terms as Governor of Chihuahua from 1892-1903. In 1904, he was elected Governor of Jalisco, winning reelection until January 1911 as an Active and Progressive. Ahumada was seen as a possible successor to President Porfirio Díaz prior to the Mexican Revolution. In 1913, he was a deputy in the 9th district of Jalisco in the legislative chamber called up by President Victoriano Huerta. He was the President of the Chamber of Deputies in 1914. He emigrated north to El Paso, Texas. He died there on August 27 of 1916 and his remains were taken to Chihuahua in March 1943, and laid to rest in the Rotunda of Illustrious Persons.

== Political achievements ==
He is one of the most progressive governors that the State of Chihuahua has had. During his administration primary education was unified under the control of the government, important material works were carried out such as drainage system for the city of Chihuahua, filters for drinking water service, The Heroes' theater, the Central Hospital, the Industrial School for Young Women was built, which was inaugurated on September 14, 1895 (its first director being Señorita Profesora Micaela Anchondo), the School of Arts and Crafts (its first director was Juan A. Creel). For these achievements, Ahumada was known as the 'Governor of Education.'

During his administration, the problem of the Tomochic Rebellion was settled and later those of Santo Tomás and Palomas, which were also severely repressed by federal troops.
