= Karina Velázquez Ramírez =

Mexican politician

Diana Velázquez Ramírez
- Born: 13 June 1970 (age 55); Hidalgo del Parral, Chihuahua, Mexico
- Occupation: Politician
- Political party: PRI

Diana Karina Velázquez Ramírez (born 13 June 1970) is a Mexican politician affiliated with the Institutional Revolutionary Party (PRI). In the 2012 general election she was elected to the Chamber of Deputies to represent the ninth district of Chihuahua during the 62nd Congress.
