= Nonoava Municipality =

Municipality in the Mexican state of Chihuahua

Nonoava
- Municipality
- Municipality of Nonoava in Chihuahua

- Location in Mexico
- Coordinates: 27°28′15″N 106°44′04″W
- Country: Mexico
- State: Chihuahua
- Municipal seat: Nonoava

Area
  - Total: 2,693.3 km^{2} (1,039.9 sq mi)

Population (2010)
  - Total: 2,849
  - Density: 1.058/km^{2} (2.740/sq mi)

Nonoava is one of the 67 municipalities of Chihuahua, in north-western Mexico. The municipal seat lies at Nonoava. The municipality covers an area of 2,693.3 km^{2}.

As of 2010, the municipality had a total population of 2,849, up from 2,810 as of 2005.

As of 2010, the town of Nonoava had a population of 1,272. Other than the town of Nonoava, the municipality had 168 localities, none of which had a population over 1,000.

== Geography ==
=== Towns and villages ===
The municipality has 59 localities. The largest are:

Name	Population (2005)
Nonoava	1,209
El Terrero	388
Humariza	289
La Junta de los Ríos	190
Total Municipality	2,810
