= Villa López =

Town in the Mexican state of Chihuahua

- Town
- Location in Mexico
- Coordinates: 27°0′N 105°2′W
- Country: Mexico
- State: Chihuahua
- Municipality: López

Population (2010)
  - Total: 2,184

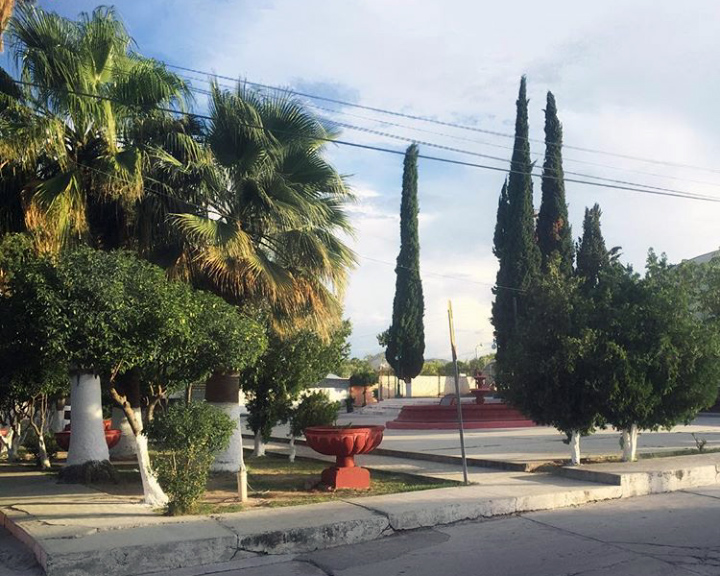
Plaza in Octaviano López, Chihuahua.

Villa López is a town and seat of the municipality of López, in the northern Mexican state of Chihuahua. As of 2010, the town had a population of 2,184, up from 2,066 as of 2005.

It was given its official modern name, "Octaviano López," after the Mexican army captain, Octaviano López. Upon its foundation in 1619, it was originally called Atotonilco.
