= José María Ponce de León =

Mexican historian and journalist

José María Ponce de León (1878–1924) was a Mexican historian and journalist. He was born in Uruachi, Chihuahua on March 13, 1878 and died in Chihuahua City on March 20, 1924. He was the son of Don Pedro Ponce de León and Paula Salmón.

== Education and career ==
Ponce de León attended the St. Augustine College in the city of Chihuahua and later the Literary and Scientific Institute of Chihuahua in 1893. Without completing his studies he took up journalism two years later, collaborating on La Idea Libre, El Siglo XX, El Norte, El Correo de Chihuahua and other newspapers. From 1909 to 1911 he published the Chihuahua Magazine, which included several articles and papers on the history of Chihuahua. He was also a contributor to numerous national and international journals and a member of several scientific and cultural societies, including the Mexican Society of Geography and Statistics.

He worked for several years in the Magisterium of the city of Chihuahua. In 1905 he held the position of Chief Clerk in the Government Department, a post in which he remained until 1912. He returned to serve in the Administrative Office in 1913 and 1919 and several times he led the General Secretariat.

As head of statistics of the government of Chihuahua, which he led without prejudice, he published several important yearbooks and bulletins as well as other interesting works on the geography and history of the state, having been considered at the time as the first authority in the field.

== Works ==
- Datos geográficos y estadísticos de Chihuahua (1902 and 1907) - Geographic and statistical data of Chihuahua.
- Reseñas históricas del Estado de Chihuahua (1905, 2nd. Ed. 1910). - Historical reviews of the State of Chihuahua.
- Anuarios estadísticos de Chihuahua (1905-1910) - Statistical Yearbooks of Chihuahua.
- Revista Chihuahuense - Chihuahuan magazine.
- Pequeño vocabulario español-tarahumara - Small Spanish-Tarahumara vocabulary.
- Resúmenes de geografía del estado de Chihuahua (Texts for students of third grade) - Geography summaries of the state of Chihuahua.
