= Valle del Rosario =

Town in the Mexican state of Chihuahua

- Town
- Location in Mexico
- Coordinates: 27°19′N 106°18′W
- Country: Mexico
- State: Chihuahua
- Municipality: Rosario

Government

Population (2010)
  - Total: 263

Valle del Rosario is a town and seat of the municipality of Rosario, in the northern Mexican state of Chihuahua. As of 2010, the town had a population of 263.
