= Rafael Pimentel =

Mexican lawyer and professor

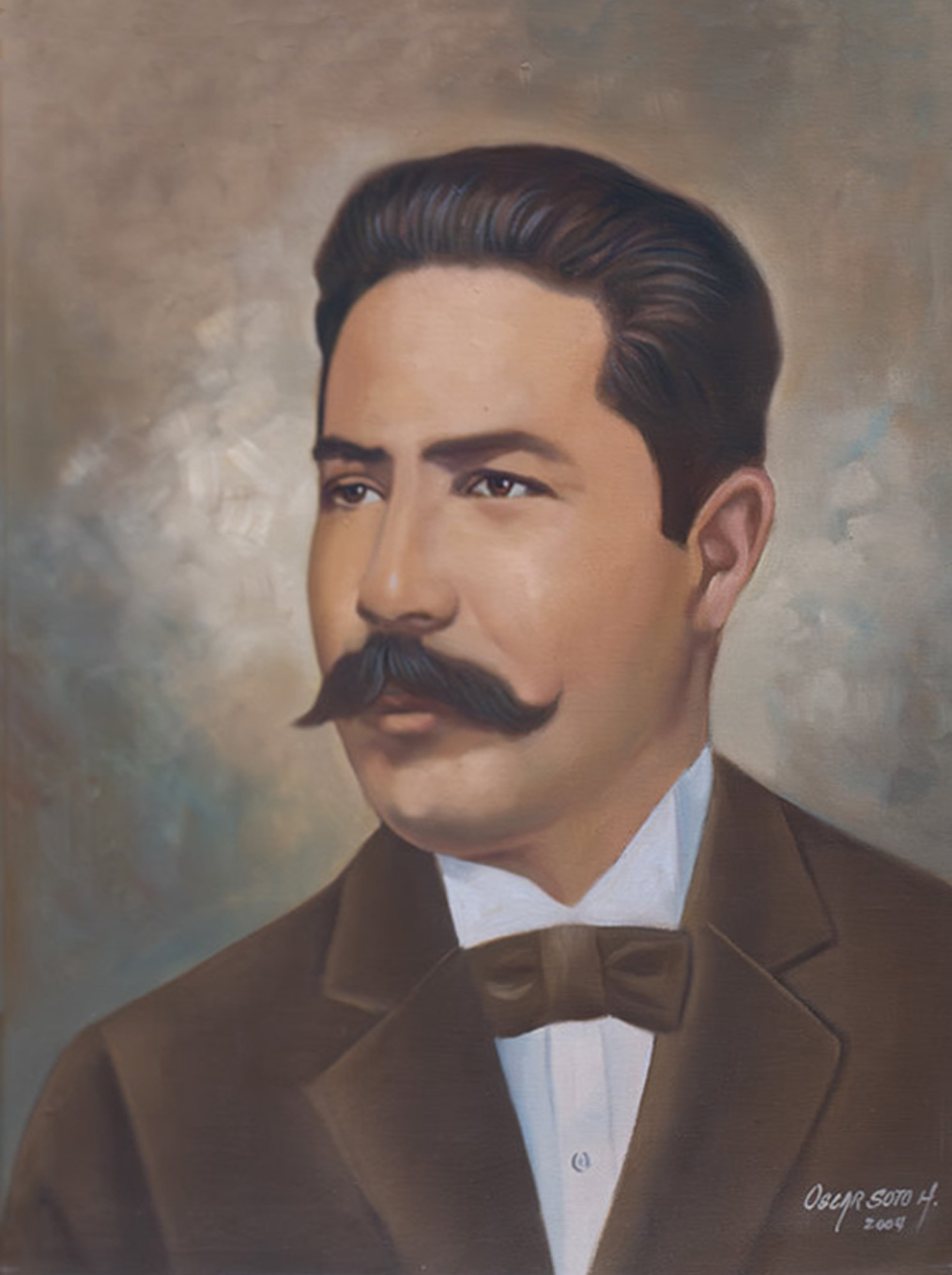

Rafael Pimentel (1855 – July 31, 1929) was a Mexican lawyer and politician. He was born in Oaxaca de Juárez in the state of Oaxaca. He was Governor of Chihuahua (1892) and Governor of Chiapas (1899–1905).

Preceded by Lauro Carrillo	Governor of Chihuahua; 1892	Succeeded by Miguel Ahumada
Preceded by Francisco León	Governor of Chiapas; 1899-1905	Unknown

== Bibliography ==
- ALMADA, Francisco R. (1980). Gobernadores del Estado de Chihuahua. Chihuahua: Centro Librero La Prensa.
- ALTAMIRANO, Graziella y VILLA, Guadalupe (1988). Chihuahua: una historia compartida 1824-1921. México, D.F.: Gobierno del Estado de Chihuahua, Instituto de Investigaciones Dr. José María Luis Mora, Universidad Autónoma de Ciudad Juárez. ISBN 968-6173-54-4.
