= Oteros River =

Location
- Country: Mexico

Physical characteristics
- Mouth
  - location: Chínipas River

The Oteros River is a river of northwestern Mexico. It is a tributary of the Chínipas River, which is part of the Fuerte River system. It originates in the Sierra Madre Occidental, and joins the Chínipas in a dramatic canyon.

== See also ==
- List of rivers of Mexico
