= Francisco R. Almada =

Mexican politician (1896–1989)

Francisco R. Almada (October 4, 1896, Chínipas, Chihuahua—June 3, 1989, Chihuahua, Chihuahua) was a Mexican teacher, investigator, historian and politician. He served as governor of the state of Chihuahua on two occasions.

== Pedagogic career ==
Almada was born in the village of Chínipas, today named Chínipas de Almada in his honor. There he began his studies. Thereafter he worked as an assistant in the primary school he had attended. It was then he decided to enter the teaching profession. His school closed, and he accepted a position as a rural teacher in Masiaca, Sonora. However, he was soon (at age 20) named director of the school in Chínipas, which was reopened upon his acceptance. Later in his career he was secretary of the Commission of Education and chief of the Department of Public Education of the state of Chihuahua.

== Political career ==
At a young age he joined in the antireelectionist movement in opposition to President Porfirio Díaz. Soon he became involved in electoral politics, leading to three terms as president of the municipality of Chínipas, all between 1918 and 1920. Three times he was deputy to the state legislature (1922, 1924 and 1928–30). Thereafter he served two terms in the federal Chamber of Deputies (1928–30 and, after reelection, 1930–32). He was a member of the Partido Revolucionario Institucional (PRI).

On July 3, 1929 he was named interim governor of the state by the legislature of Chihuahua, temporarily replacing Governor Luis L. León until the latter returned to office on November 9, 1929. León again asked for leave on December 6, and Almada again occupied the office.

== Attempted coup ==
On June 25, 1930, a coup led by deputies Manuel Jesús Estrada and Manuel Prieto overthrew the governor in a two-hour gun battle that killed one deputy and the chief of police. A company of federal troops then surrounded the governmental palace and restored Almada. Thereupon the legislature impeached him, charging him with partiality in the ongoing gubernatorial election. The legislature installed Estrada as governor, but Estrada was not recognized by the national government of Pascual Ortiz Rubio. The federal government again reinstated Almada, on June 27.

The situation remained tense, with many Chihuahuans taking up arms, but no further bloodshed occurred. The two sides presented their cases to the federal government, and on July 10 the government again sided with Almada. A few days later (July 15), he resigned, being replaced by Romulo Escobar.

== Later life ==
Later he was a judge of the Civil Registry, director of the Regional Museum and head of the Department of Historical Studies of the Universidad Autónoma de Chihuahua.

Almada was the founder and president of the Sociedad chihuahuense de estudios Históricos (Chihuahua Society of Historical Studies) and an assiduous investigator and writer, publishing various works on the history and geography of Chihuahua and other Mexican states. He was a member of the Academia Mexicana de la Lengua, of the Sociedad Mexicana de Geografía y Estadística and of the Asociación Mexicana de Historia.

In June 1976 the state legislature named Chínipas the capital of the state for one day, and changed the name to Chínipas de Almada. In 1980 the Chihuahua Society of Historical Studies dedicated a plaque at the summit of Cerro Mohinora (elev. 3,313 m) with the following legend: "The two highest summits of Chihuahua, Mohinora and Francisco R. Almada."

== Published works ==
- Diccionario de historia, geografía y biografía chihuahuenses, 2a. Edición, Inédita, 1927
- Gobernantes de Chihuahua, 1929
- Apuntes Históricos de la Región de Chínipas, 1937
- Diccionario de historia, biografía y geografía del estado de Colima, 1939
- Guadalupe y Calvo, 1940
- La imprenta y el periodismo en Chihuahua, 1943
- Gobernantes del Estado de Chihuahua, 1951
- Diccionario de Historia, Biografía y Geografía sonorenses, 1952
- Hombres de Nuevo León y Coahuila en la defensa de Puebla y prisioneros en Francia en 1862, 1962
- La revolución en el estado de Chihuahua, 1965
- La revolución en el estado de Sonora, 1971
- La invasión de los filibusteros de Crabb al estado de Sonora, 1973

== Notes ==
Preceded by Luis L. León	Governor of Chihuahua; 1929	Succeeded by Luis L. León
Preceded by Luis L. León	Governor of Chihuahua; 1929 - 1930	Succeeded by Rómulo Escobar Zerman
