= Maguarichi Municipality =

Municipality in the Mexican state of Chihuahua

Maguarichi
- Municipality
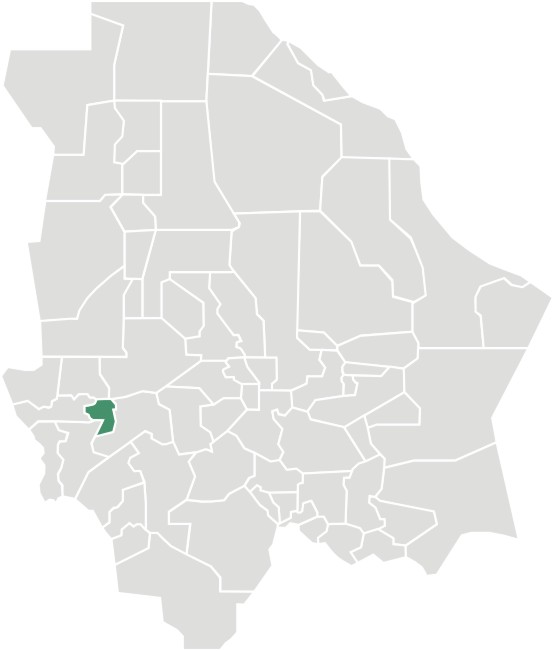
- Municipality of Maguarichi in Chihuahua

- Location in Mexico
- Coordinates: 27°51′29″N 107°59′38″W
- Country: Mexico
- State: Chihuahua
- Municipal seat: Maguarichi

Area
  - Total: 937.2 km^{2} (361.9 sq mi)

Population (2010)
  - Total: 1,921
  - Density: 2.050/km^{2} (5.309/sq mi)

Maguarichi is one of the 67 municipalities of Chihuahua, in northern Mexico. The municipal seat lies at Maguarichi village. The municipality covers an area of 937.2 km^{2}.

As of 2010, the municipality had a total population of 1,921, down from 2,116 as of 2005.

The municipality had 158 localities, none of which had a population over 1,000.

== Geography ==
=== Towns and villages ===
The municipality has 84 localities. The largest are:

Name	Population (2005)
Maguarichi	751
Ocoviachi	241
San José de las Lajas	93
Total Municipality	2,116
