= Témoris =

Town in the Mexican state of Chihuahua

- Town
- Location in Chihuahua
- Coordinates: 27°16′N 108°15′W
- Country: Mexico
- State: Chihuahua
- Municipality: Guazapares

Population (2010)
  - Total: 2,053

Témoris is a town and seat of the municipality of Guazapares, in the northern Mexican state of Chihuahua. As of 2010, the town had a population of 2,053, up from 1,639 as of 2005. Témoris is a stop on the Copper Canyon Railway.
