= Huejotitán =

Village in the Mexican state of Chihuahua

- Village
- Location in Mexico Huejotitán (Chihuahua)
- Coordinates: 27°4′N 106°12′W
- Country: Mexico
- State: Chihuahua
- Municipality: Huejotitán

Population (2020)
  - Total: 824

Huejotitán is a village and seat of the municipality of Huejotitán, in the northern Mexican state of Chihuahua. As of 2020, Huejotitán had a population of 824, up from 345 as of 2010.

Huejotitan was the site of a Jesuit mission to the Tarahumara established about 1640 by missionaries José Pascual and Nicolás de Zepeda.
