= San Francisco de Borja Municipality =

Municipality in the Mexican state of Chihuahua

San Francisco de Borja
- Municipality
- Municipality of San Francisco de Borja in Chihuahua

- Location in Mexico
- Coordinates: 27°54′07″N 106°41′04″W
- Country: Mexico
- State: Chihuahua
- Municipal seat: San Francisco de Borja

Area
  - Total: 1,124.7 km^{2} (434.2 sq mi)

Population (2010)
  - Total: 2,290
  - Density: 2.04/km^{2} (5.27/sq mi)

San Francisco de Borja is one of the 67 municipalities of Chihuahua, in northern Mexico. The municipal seat lies at San Francisco de Borja. The municipality covers an area of 1,124.7 km^{2} (434.2 sq mi).

As of 2010, the municipality had a total population of 2,290, up from 2,243 as of 2005.

As of 2010, the town of San Francisco de Borja had a population of 1,157. Other than the town of San Francisco de Borja, the municipality had 81 localities, none of which had a population over 1,000.
