= El Tule Municipality =

Municipality in the Mexican state of Chihuahua

El Tule
- Municipality
- Municipality of El Tule in Chihuahua

- Location in Mexico
- Coordinates: 28°9′18″N 106°28′37″W
- Country: Mexico
- State: Chihuahua
- Municipal seat: El Tule

Area
  - Total: 409.4 km^{2} (158.1 sq mi)

Population (2010)
  - Total: 1,869

El Tule is one of the 67 municipalities of Chihuahua, in northern Mexico. The municipal seat is the town of El Tule. The municipality covers an area of 409.4 km^{2}. The municipal seat is El Tule, Chihuahua.

As of 2010, the municipality had a total population of 1,869, up from 1,818 as of 2005.

The municipality had 35 localities, none of which had a population over 1,000.

== Geography ==
=== Towns and villages ===
The municipality has 31 localities.

Name	Population (2005)
El Tule	828
Baqueteros	395
Total Municipality	1818
