= Hermosillo (surname) =

Hermosillo is a Spanish surname. Notable people with the surname include:

- Carlos Hermosillo (born 1964), Mexican footballer
- Carmen Hermosillo (died 2008), American writer and poet
- Jaime Humberto Hermosillo (1942–2020), Mexican film director
- Mayra Hermosillo (born 1987), Mexican actress and filmmaker
- Michael Hermosillo (born 1995), American baseball outfielder
- Víctor Hermosillo y Celada (born 1939), Mexican politician
