= Guazapares Municipality =

Municipality in the Mexican state of Chihuahua

Guazapares
- Municipality
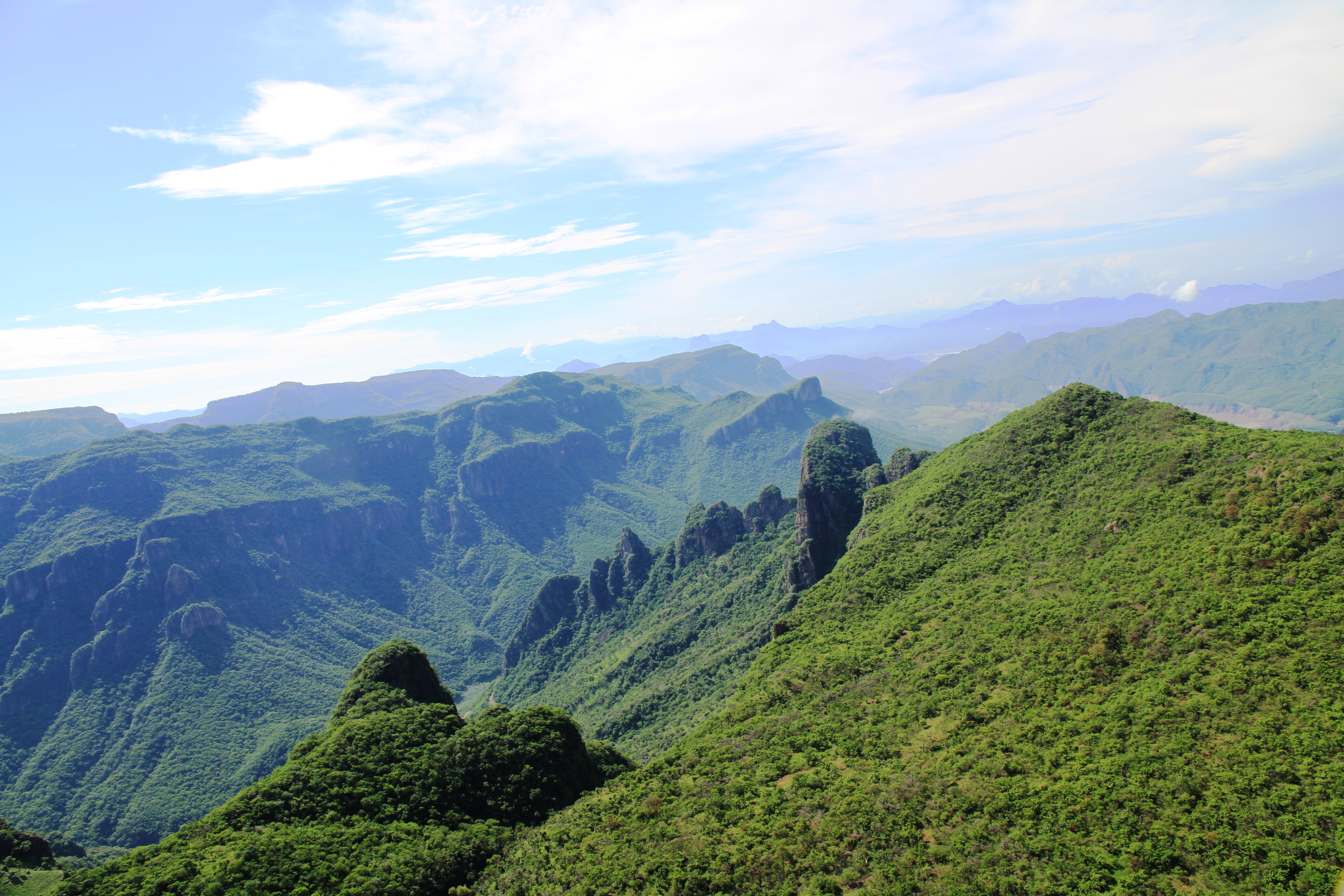

- Municipality of Guazapares in Chihuahua

- Location in Mexico
- Coordinates: 27°16′31″N 108°16′40″W
- Country: Mexico
- State: Chihuahua
- Municipal seat: Témoris

Area
  - Total: 2,145.8 km^{2} (828.5 sq mi)

Population (2010)
  - Total: 8,998

Guazapares is one of the 67 municipalities of Chihuahua, in northern Mexico. The municipal seat lies at Témoris. The municipality covers an area of 2,145.8 km^{2}.

As of 2010, the municipality had a total population of 8,998, up from 8,010 as of 2005.

The municipality had 492 localities, the largest of which (with 2010 populations in parentheses) was: Témoris (2,053), classified as rural.

== History ==
As a pueblo, Guazapares was home to the Guazapare people, a tribal group who spoke a dialect of the Tarahumara language. After Jesuit missionaries Julio Pascual and Manuel Martinez were killed in a 1632 uprising, Pedro de Perea led a punitive expedition against native groups including the Guazapare, killing about 800 natives. The surviving Guazapare were reduced into the Jesuit missions.

== Geography ==
=== Towns and villages ===
The municipality has 352 localities. The largest are:

Name	Population (2005)
Témoris	1,639
Santa Matilde	301
Hormigueros	189
Estación Témoris	133
Total Municipality	8,010
