= Nonoava =

Town in the Mexican state of Chihuahua

- Town
- Location in Mexico
- Coordinates: 27°28′N 106°44′W
- Country: Mexico
- State: Chihuahua
- Municipality: Nonoava

Population (2010)
  - Total: 1,272

Nonoava is a town and seat of the municipality of Nonoava, in the northern Mexican state of Chihuahua. As of 2010, the town of Nonoava had a population of 1,272, up from 1,209 as of 2005. The settlement was founded on the right bank of the Nonoava River in 1676 by the Jesuit missionary Francis Artuaga, and named Nuestra Señora de Montserrat de Nonoava.
