= José Joaquín Calvo =

Mexican politician

José Joaquin del Calvo Lopez (January 16, 1798 in Cuba – February 28, 1838 in Chihuahua, Mexico) was a Mexican soldier.

== Biography ==
He was born in Havana, Cuba, on January 16, 1798 being his parents Thomas and Clara López Calvo. He joined the Spanish military in 1812 and when the Independence of Mexico, arrived in 1818 on the orders of the Viceroy Juan Ruiz de Apodaca, with the rank of second lieutenant. He fought insurgents in Veracruz and Michoacan, until in 1821 decides to join the independence cause, and entered the City of Mexico with Trigarante Army on September 27, 1821. He served in the streets of Morelos, Jalisco, State of Mexico, Sonora and Sinaloa, reaching the degree of brigadier general. From 1822 to 1824 he was appointed political and military Chief of Querétaro, equivalent to governor. During the Revolt of Querétaro on December 12, 1823, while he was commander of the square, he was arrested by the 8.º. Regiment based in Santiago de Querétaro, same as did a military mutiny commanded by a Spanish sergeant and an Andalusian of Cadiz. In 1828 he bought the Hacienda de Salaices in Chihuahua. On 18 September 1834 he assumed the governorship of Chihuahua and New Mexico.
