= Rosario Municipality, Chihuahua =

Municipality in the Mexican state of Chihuahua

Rosario
- Municipality
- Municipality of Rosario in Chihuahua

- Location in Mexico
- Coordinates: 27°19′N 106°14′W
- Country: Mexico
- State: Chihuahua
- Municipal seat: Valle del Rosario

Area
  - Total: 1,785.6 km^{2} (689.4 sq mi)

Population (2010)
  - Total: 2,235
  - Density: 1.252/km^{2} (3.242/sq mi)

Rosario is one of the 67 municipalities of Chihuahua, in northern Mexico. The municipal seat lies at Valle del Rosario. The municipality covers an area of 1785.6 km^{2}.

As of 2010, the municipality had a total population of 2,235, down from 3,130 as of 2005.

The municipality had 62 localities, none of which had a population over 1,000.
