= López Municipality =

Municipality in the Mexican state of Chihuahua

López
- Municipality
- Municipality of López in Chihuahua

- Location in Mexico
- Coordinates: 29°21′25″N 107°44′16″W
- Country: Mexico
- State: Chihuahua
- Municipal seat: Villa López
- Founded: November 21, 1844

Area
  - Total: 1,317.1 km^{2} (508.5 sq mi)

Population (2010)
  - Total: 4,025
  - Density: 3.056/km^{2} (7.915/sq mi)

López is one of the 67 municipalities of Chihuahua, in northern Mexico. The municipal seat lies at Villa López. The municipality covers an area of 1,317.1 km^{2}.

As of 2010, the municipality had a total population of 4,025, up from 3,914 as of 2005.

The municipality had 109 localities, the largest of which (with 2010 population in parentheses) was: Octaviano López (2,148).

== Geography ==
=== Towns and villages ===
The municipality has 40 localities. The largest are:

Name	Population (2005)
Villa López	2,066
Santa María	581
Salaices	476
Santa Ana de Abajo	204
Total Municipality	3,914
