= San Bernardo, Sonora =

Coordinates: 27°28′N 108°48′W

San Bernardo is a village in Sonora, Mexico.

== Climate ==
Climate data for San Bernardo, Sonora (SMN), normals 1981-2010
Month	Jan	Feb	Mar	Apr	May	Jun	Jul	Aug	Sep	Oct	Nov	Dec	Year
Record high °C (°F)	40.5 (104.9)	43.0 (109.4)	45.0 (113.0)	45.5 (113.9)	46.0 (114.8)	49.0 (120.2)	47.5 (117.5)	46.5 (115.7)	46.0 (114.8)	43.5 (110.3)	41.0 (105.8)	39.5 (103.1)	49.0 (120.2)
Mean daily maximum °C (°F)	27.1 (80.8)	28.5 (83.3)	30.8 (87.4)	34.4 (93.9)	38.1 (100.6)	40.1 (104.2)	37.1 (98.8)	36.0 (96.8)	35.6 (96.1)	33.3 (91.9)	30.2 (86.4)	26.5 (79.7)	33.1 (91.7)
Daily mean °C (°F)	16.7 (62.1)	17.8 (64.0)	19.8 (67.6)	23.1 (73.6)	26.9 (80.4)	30.8 (87.4)	29.6 (85.3)	28.8 (83.8)	28.0 (82.4)	24.4 (75.9)	20.1 (68.2)	16.4 (61.5)	23.5 (74.3)
Mean daily minimum °C (°F)	6.3 (43.3)	7.1 (44.8)	8.8 (47.8)	11.7 (53.1)	15.6 (60.1)	21.5 (70.7)	22.1 (71.8)	21.5 (70.7)	20.5 (68.9)	15.5 (59.9)	9.9 (49.8)	6.3 (43.3)	13.9 (57.0)
Record low °C (°F)	−5.5 (22.1)	−6.5 (20.3)	0.0 (32.0)	3.0 (37.4)	4.0 (39.2)	9.0 (48.2)	14.0 (57.2)	14.0 (57.2)	9.0 (48.2)	2.0 (35.6)	−2.0 (28.4)	−4.0 (24.8)	−6.5 (20.3)
Average precipitation mm (inches)	33.8 (1.33)	23.1 (0.91)	10.2 (0.40)	5.4 (0.21)	5.7 (0.22)	34.5 (1.36)	187.4 (7.38)	182.3 (7.18)	127.5 (5.02)	51.5 (2.03)	27.5 (1.08)	54.3 (2.14)	743.2 (29.26)
Average precipitation days	2.9	2.2	1.1	0.7	0.8	3.7	13.6	12.8	7.8	2.8	2.2	2.3	52.9
Mean daily daylight hours	11.1	11.7	12.4	13.2	13.9	14.3	14.1	13.5	12.7	11.9	11.2	10.9	12.6
Source 1: Servicio Meteorologico Nacional
Source 2: Weatherbase (daylight hours)
