= Luis Carlos Campos Villegas =

Mexican politician

- Born: 29 October 1959 (age 66); Hidalgo del Parral, Chihuahua, Mexico
- Occupation: Politician
- Political party: PRI

Luis Carlos Campos Villegas (born 29 October 1959) is a Mexican politician from the Institutional Revolutionary Party (PRI). In the 2009 mid-terms he was elected to the Chamber of Deputies to represent the ninth district of Chihuahua during the 61st Congress (2009–2012).
