= Vicente N. Mendoza =

Mexican politician

Vicente Néstor Mendoza Balderrama (1876–1940) was a Mexican politician and jurist.

== Life and career ==
Vicente Néstor Mendoza Balderrama was born in 1876 in Santa Isabel, in the Mexican state of Chihuahua. He was part of a family of peasants, earning their living by cultivating small areas of land. His education was limited to elementary school. Gradually he became prominent in his native town and eventually became the municipal president, equivalent to Mayor of the town. He married on the year of 1903, to a peasant lady named Francisca Parada, and they had eight children. The family became prominent and established a store selling daily household items.

Around the year 1910, the Mexican Revolution began and the family had to leave Santa Isabel, and establish in the city of Chihuahua, capital of the state. Again, Vicente N. Mendoza became prominent in the government of the State; eventually he became served in the XXX Legislature of the state congress and then was chosen to be Interim Governor of the State in the years of 1924 and 1925. Thereafter, he held a position of Minister of the Supreme Tribunal of Justice. By this time he had developed self-taught qualities of a lawyer and therefore held several positions as Judge in different towns of the state, namely: Batopilas, Camargo, Parral, Cusihuiriachic and Santa Bárbara. He died on January 3, 1940, in Mexico City.
