= Satevó Municipality =

Municipality in the Mexican state of Chihuahua

Satevó
- Municipality
- Municipality of Satevó in Chihuahua
- Coordinates: 27°57′15″N 106°6′23″W
- Country: Mexico
- State: Chihuahua
- Founded: 21 November 1844
- Named for: "sandy lands" in Tarahumara
- Seat: San Francisco Javier de Satevó
- Largest city: San Francisco Javier de Satevó

Area
  - Total: 2,185.1 km^{2} (843.7 sq mi)
- Elevation: 1,380 m (4,530 ft)

Population (2010)
  - Total: 3,662
  - Density: 1.676/km^{2} (4.341/sq mi)
- Time zone: UTC-6:00
- Website: www.satevo.gob.mx

Satevó is one of the 67 municipalities of Chihuahua, in northern Mexico. The municipal seat lies at San Francisco Javier de Satevó. The municipality covers an area of 2,185.1 km^{2}.

As of 2010, the municipality had a total population of 3,662, down from 3,856 as of 2005.

The municipality had 244 localities, none of which had a population over 1,000.

Satevó began as a Jesuit mission to the Tarahumara in about 1640.

== Geography ==
=== Towns and villages ===
The municipality has 126 localities. The largest are:

Name	Population (2005)
San Francisco Javier de Satevó	451
El Chamizal	244
La Joya	237
San José del Sitio	214
Babonoyaba	155
Los Veranos
Total Municipality	3,856
