= Chínipas de Almada =

Town in the Mexican state of Chihuahua

- Town
- Chínipas de Almada is located in Chínipas Municipality

- Location in Mexico
- Coordinates: 27°24′N 108°32′W
- Country: Mexico
- State: Chihuahua
- Municipality: Chínipas
- Mission established: 31 December 1626

Population (2010)
  - Total: 1,934
- Postal code: 33360
- Demonym: Chinipense

Chínipas de Almada is a town in the south-western portion of the Mexican state of Chihuahua, in the Sierra Madre Occidental. It serves as the municipal seat of the surrounding municipality of Chínipas.

The name honours Francisco R. Almada, a historian and two-time governor of Chihuahua born in the town; the "de Almada" suffix was added by the State Congress on 17 June 1976, when Chínipas served as the state capital for one day.

== Demography ==
As of 2010, Chínipas de Almada had a population of 1,934, up from 1,398 as of 2005.

== History ==
Chínipas was founded as a mission town by the Jesuits Pedro Juan Castini and Julio Pascual on 31 December 1626. They were both killed, and the mission destroyed, during a Native war against the Spaniards, on 1 February 1632. The mission was rebuilt, slightly downstream, in 1676.

Gold was found locally in 1798, which led to the town's rapid expansion with European settlers in the late 19th century. Well known local family names include Piero, Sarracino the Santinis from Italy, Balderrama from Spain, the Schultzes from Germany, the Russos from Sicily, the O'Leary's from Ireland (now spelled Alire), the Bridge's from England (now spelled Breach) and the Willis' from England (now spelled Villis). The largest mine was called the Palmarejo and was British-owned. The equipment was manufactured in England, shipped to Guaymas on the Sonora coast, transported by mule or donkey to San Bernardo, Sonora and then over the mountains on people's backs.

== Geography ==
=== Climate ===
Climate data for Chinipas (1951-2010)
Month	Jan	Feb	Mar	Apr	May	Jun	Jul	Aug	Sep	Oct	Nov	Dec	Year
Record high °C (°F)	38.0 (100.4)	42.0 (107.6)	41.5 (106.7)	44.0 (111.2)	48.0 (118.4)	49.0 (120.2)	46.0 (114.8)	42.0 (107.6)	45.0 (113.0)	44.0 (111.2)	42.0 (107.6)	37.5 (99.5)	49.0 (120.2)
Mean daily maximum °C (°F)	23.3 (73.9)	25.7 (78.3)	29.1 (84.4)	32.3 (90.1)	35.7 (96.3)	38.6 (101.5)	35.7 (96.3)	34.6 (94.3)	33.8 (92.8)	30.9 (87.6)	26.6 (79.9)	23.3 (73.9)	30.8 (87.4)
Daily mean °C (°F)	15.6 (60.1)	17.6 (63.7)	20.3 (68.5)	22.8 (73.0)	26.3 (79.3)	30.3 (86.5)	28.9 (84.0)	28.4 (83.1)	27.7 (81.9)	24.2 (75.6)	19.5 (67.1)	16.2 (61.2)	23.1 (73.6)
Mean daily minimum °C (°F)	8.2 (46.8)	9.4 (48.9)	11.4 (52.5)	13.3 (55.9)	16.9 (62.4)	21.9 (71.4)	22.1 (71.8)	22.2 (72.0)	21.5 (70.7)	17.4 (63.3)	12.4 (54.3)	9.0 (48.2)	15.5 (59.9)
Record low °C (°F)	−4.0 (24.8)	0.0 (32.0)	3.0 (37.4)	4.0 (39.2)	7.0 (44.6)	6.0 (42.8)	12.5 (54.5)	13.0 (55.4)	15.0 (59.0)	7.0 (44.6)	2.0 (35.6)	−6.0 (21.2)	−6.0 (21.2)
Average precipitation mm (inches)	41.7 (1.64)	25.4 (1.00)	11.0 (0.43)	7.4 (0.29)	8.1 (0.32)	81.7 (3.22)	253.9 (10.00)	219.4 (8.64)	133.3 (5.25)	55.5 (2.19)	28.5 (1.12)	46.8 (1.84)	912.7 (35.93)
Average precipitation days (≥ 0.1 mm)	3.0	2.3	1.1	0.7	0.9	5.6	15.8	13.7	8.3	3.2	2.0	3.0	59.6
Source: Servicio Meteorológico National
