= Carichí =

Town in the Mexican state of Chihuahua

- Town
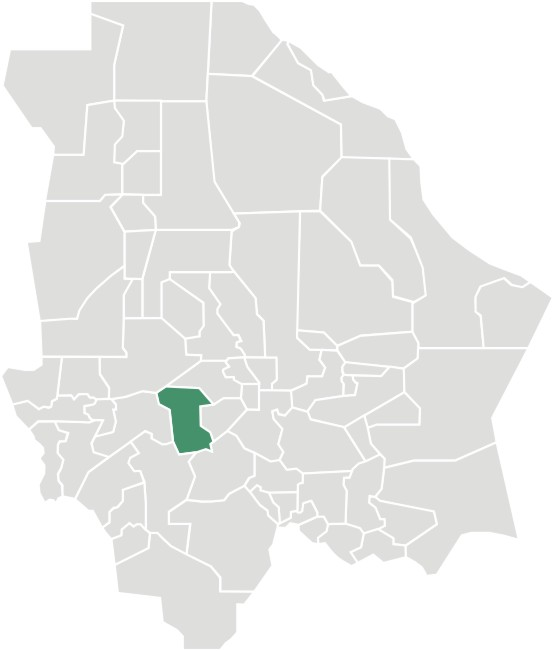
- Municipality of Carichí in Chihuahua

- Location in Mexico Carichí (Chihuahua)
- Coordinates: 27°55′N 107°03′W
- Country: Mexico
- State: Chihuahua
- Municipality: Carichí
- Elevation: 2,080 m (6,820 ft)

Population (2010)
  - Total: 1,672
- Time zone: UTC−06:00 (Central)
- Demonym: Carichiteco

Carichí is a town in the Mexican state of Chihuahua. It serves as the municipal seat of the surrounding municipality of the same name.

The town was founded as a Jesuit mission, Nombre de Jesús Carichi, on 18 November 1675. Its name comes from the Tarahumara name Güerocarichí. Prior to 24 August 1982, the town was officially known by the alternative name Carichic.

As of 2020, the town of Carichí had a population of 1,830, up from 1,672 in 2010.

== Geography ==
Carichí is located at an altitude of 2,064 m (6,772 ft).

=== Climate ===
Carchi has a semi-arid climate.
