= El Tule, Chihuahua =

Town in the Mexican state of Chihuahua

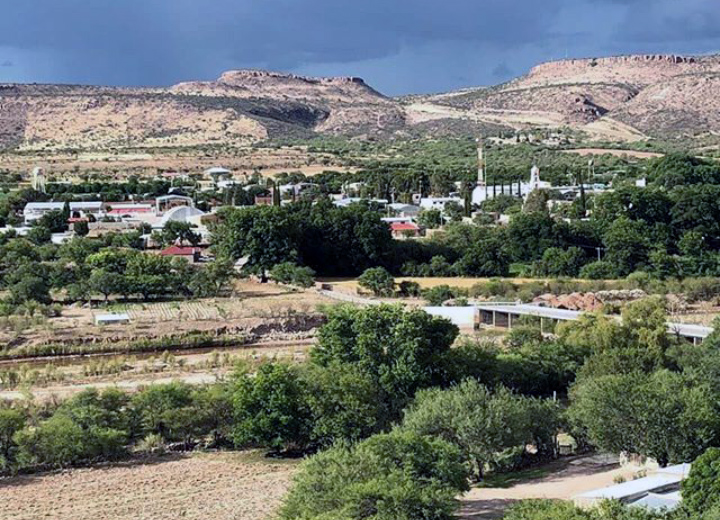
Vistas a El Tule, Chihuahua

San Antonio Del Tule is a town in the northern Mexican state of Chihuahua. The town serves as the seat of government for the surrounding El Tule Municipality which shares its name. As of 2010, the town had a population of 811.
