= Maguarichi =

Town in the Mexican state of Chihuahua

- Town
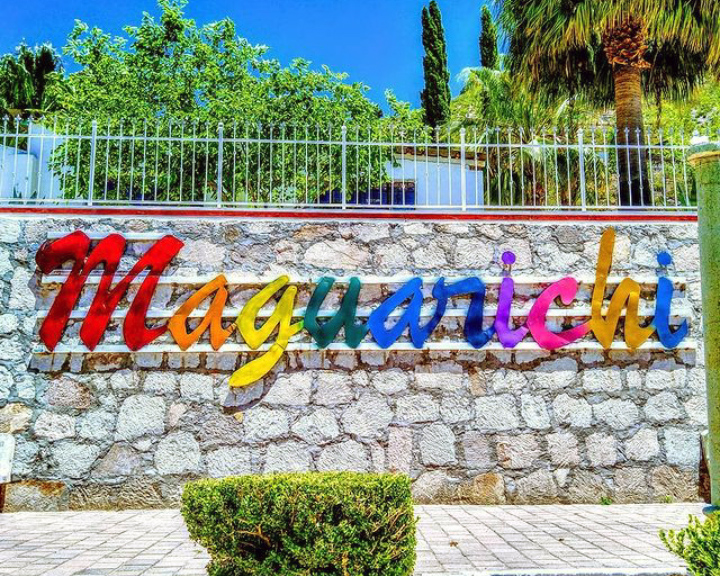
- Maguarichi sign

- Location in Mexico
- Coordinates: 27°51′29″N 107°59′38″W
- Country: Mexico
- State: Chihuahua
- Municipality: Maguarichi

Population (2010)
  - Total: 801
- Climate: Csa

Maguarichi is a town and seat of the municipality of Maguarichi, in the northern Mexican state of Chihuahua. As of 2010, the town had a population of 801, up from 751 as of 2005.
