= Jesús Aguilar Bueno =

Mexican politician (born 1968)

- Born: 12 August 1968 (age 57); Ciudad Jiménez, Chihuahua, Mexico
- Occupation: Politician
- Political party: PRI

Jesús Aguilar Bueno (born 12 August 1968) is a Mexican politician affiliated with the Institutional Revolutionary Party (PRI). In the 2003 mid-terms he was elected to the Chamber of Deputies to represent the ninth district of Chihuahua for the PRI during the 59th Congress, but on 16 March 2006 he broke with the party and declared himself an independent.
