= Chínipas Municipality =

Municipality in the Mexican state of Chihuahua

Chínipas
- Municipality
- Municipality of Chínipas in Chihuahua

- Location in Mexico
- Coordinates: 27°24′N 108°32′W
- Country: Mexico
- State: Chihuahua
- Municipal seat: Chínipas de Almada

Area
  - Total: 2,278.9 km^{2} (879.9 sq mi)

Population (2010)
  - Total: 8,441

Chínipas is one of the 67 municipalities of Chihuahua, in northern Mexico. The municipal seat lies at Chínipas de Almada. The municipality covers an area of 2,278.9 km^{2}.

As of 2010, the municipality had a total population of 8,441, up from 7,233 as of 2005.

The municipality had 256 localities, the largest of which (with 2010 populations in parentheses) were: Chínipas de Almada (1,934), classified as urban, and Milpillas (1,025), classified as rural.
