= Uruachi =

Town in Chihuahua, Mexico

- Municipal seat
- Municipality of Uruachi in Chihuahua

- Location in Mexico
- Coordinates: 27°52′02″N 108°12′57″W
- Country: Mexico
- State: Chihuahua
- Municipality: Uruachi
- Elevation: 1,360 m (4,460 ft)

Population (2010)
  - Total: 1,199
- Postal code: 33300
- Area code: 635

Uruachi (a name in the Tarahumara language of disputed meaning; also known as Mineral de Urachi on account of its mining activities) is a town in the Mexican state of Chihuahua, close to the border with the state of Sonora. It serves as the municipal seat of the surrounding municipality of Uruachi.

As of 2010, the town of Uruachi had a population of 1,199. up from 806 as of 2005.

The settlement was founded by Jesuit missionaries in 1736.
