= San Francisco de Borja =

Town in the Mexican state of Chihuahua

- Town
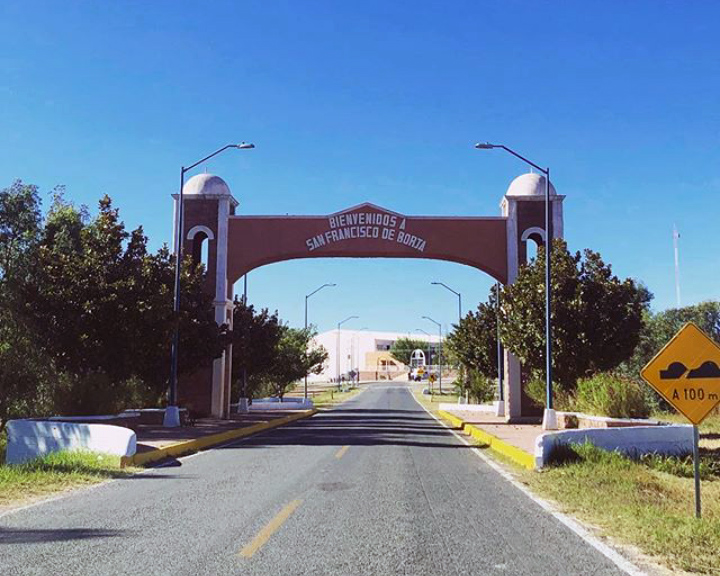
- Arch at the city entrance

- Location in Mexico
- Coordinates: 27°53′N 106°40′W
- Country: Mexico
- State: Chihuahua
- Municipality: San Francisco de Borja

Population (2010)
  - Total: 1,157

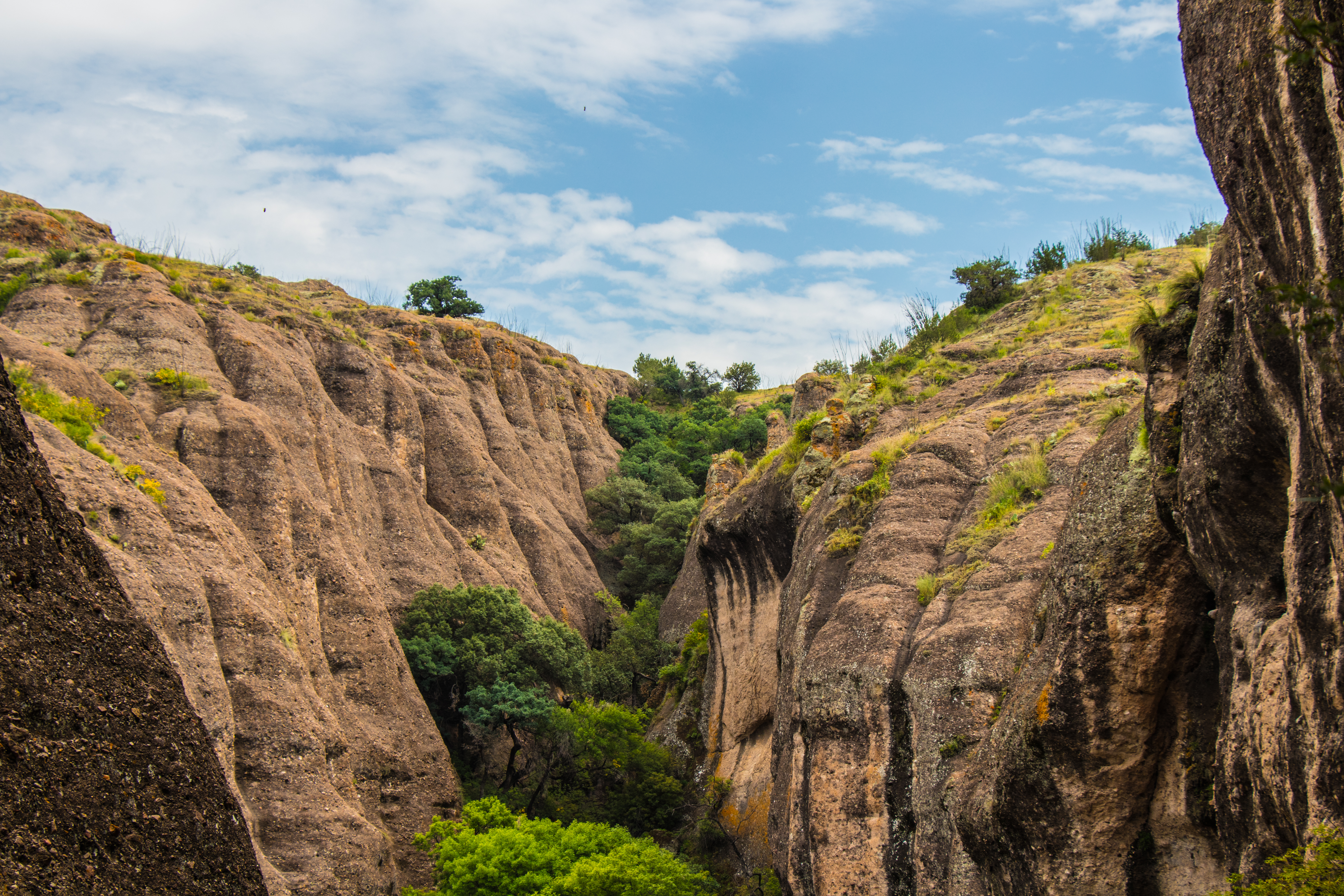
Namúrachi canyon

San Francisco de Borja is a town and seat of the municipality of San Francisco de Borja, in the northern Mexican state of Chihuahua. As of 2010, the town of San Francisco de Borja had a population of 1,157, up from 1,142 as of 2005.

San Francisco de Borja was founded as a Jesuit mission in the 1640s to the Rarámuri. The Rarámuri destroyed it in war with the Spanish in 1648, but it was later rebuilt.
