= Governor of Chihuahua =

Chief executive of the Mexican state of Chihuahua

- Coat of arms of Chihuahua

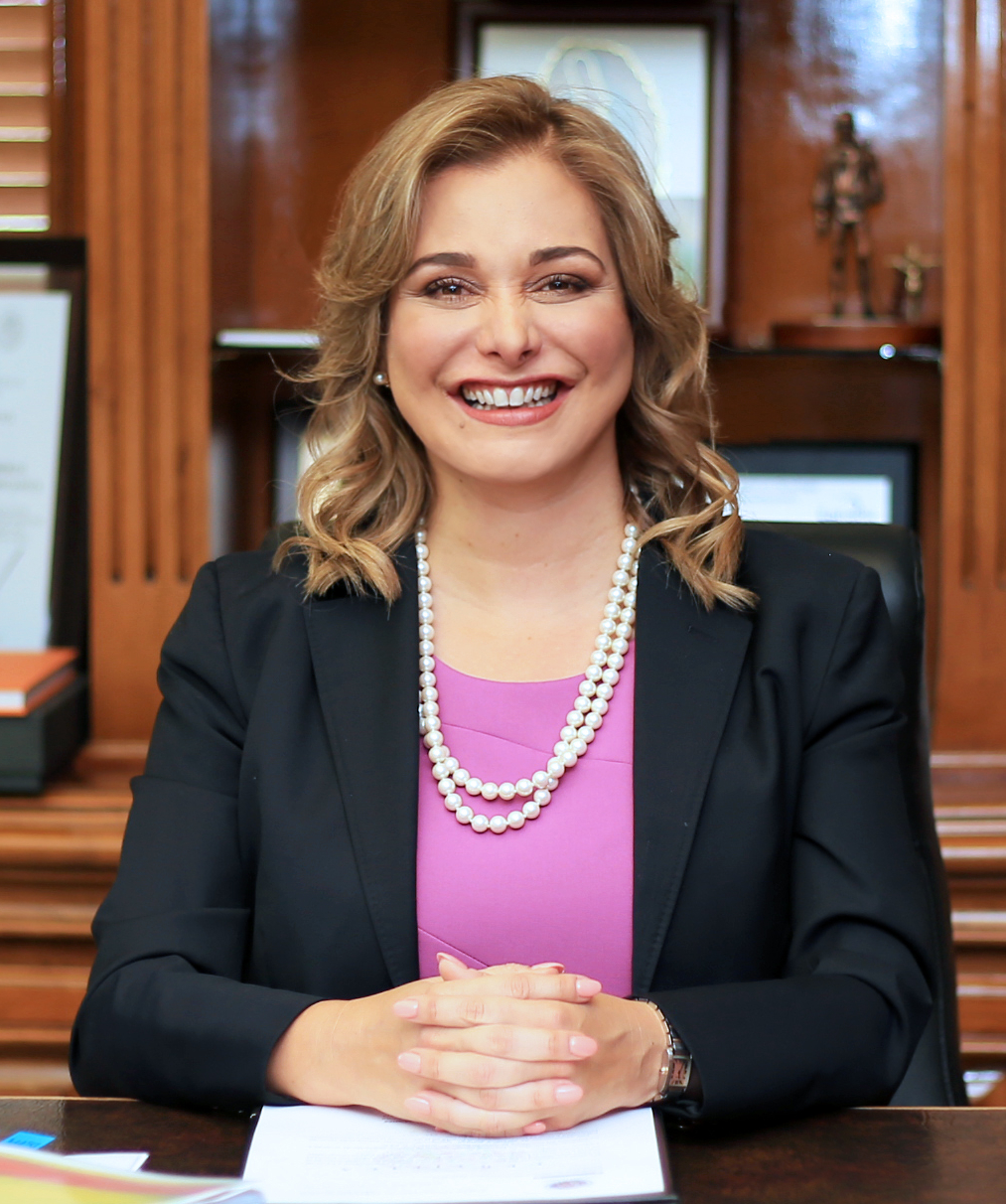
- Incumbent; Maru Campos since September 8, 2021
- Residence: Palacio de Gobierno de Chihuahua
- Term length: 6 years, one term only
- Inaugural holder: José Ignacio de Urquidi

According to the Political Constitution of the Free and Sovereign State of Chihuahua, Executive Power in that Mexican state resides with a single individual, the Governor of the Free and Sovereign State of Chihuahua (Spanish: Gobernador del Estado Libre y Soberano de Chihuahua), who is chosen for a period of six years and cannot for any reason be re-elected. The term of governor begins on October 4 of the year of the election and finishes on October 3 after six years have elapsed. Gubernatorial elections are held two years prior to presidential elections.

The state of Chihuahua was created on July 6, 1824, as one of the original states of the federation recognized by the 1824 Constitution. It has survived through all the different systems of government Mexico has had, both the federal system and the central system, and so its status has changed between that of a state and a department; along with that, the denomination of the holder of the executive power also changed.

In order to be elected, the Governor must be under the Constitution of Mexico a Mexican citizen by birth, not less than 30 years of age, and a native or resident of Chihuahua for at least 5 years prior to inauguration.

Current holder, María Eugenia Campos Galván, became on September 8, 2021 the first woman to ever serve as Governor of the state of Chihuahua.

== Governors of the Province of Chihuahua (1823-1824) ==
No.	Name (Birth–Death)	Term
1	Mariano Orcasitas (1782–1839)	11 August 1823 – 19 November 1823
2	José Ignacio de Urquidi (1771–1826)	19 November 1823 – 3 April 1824
3	?	3 April 1824 – 17 May 1824
4	José Ignacio de Urquidi (1771–1826)	17 May 1824 – 8 September 1824

== Governors of the Free and Sovereign State of Chihuahua (1824–Today) ==
No.	Portrait	Name (Birth–Death)	Term	Party
1		José Ignacio de Urquidi (1771–1826)	8 September 1824 – 26 September 1825	Unaffiliated
2		José Antonio Arce Hinojos (1784–?)	26 September 1825 – 26 November 1825	Unaffiliated
3		José Ignacio de Urquidi (1771–1826)	26 November 1825 – 27 February 1826	Unaffiliated
4		José Antonio Arce Hinojos (1784–?)	27 February 1826 – 25 September 1826	Unaffiliated
5		Simón Elías González (1772–1841)	25 September 1826 – 27 November 1826	Unaffiliated
6		José Antonio Arce Hinojos (1784–?)	27 November 1826 – 29 March 1827	Unaffiliated
7		José Antonio Ruiz de Bustamante (1788–1840)	29 March 1827 – 2 October 1827	Unaffiliated
8		Simón Elías González (1772–1841)	2 October 1827 – 29 January 1828	Unaffiliated
9		José Antonio Arce Hinojos (1784–?)	29 January 1828 – 2 June 1830	Unaffiliated
10		José Andrés Luján del Castillo (1792–1856)	2 June 1830 – 28 June 1830	Unaffiliated
11		José Antonio Arce Hinojos (1784–?)	28 June 1830 – 20 August 1830	Unaffiliated
12		José Isidro Madero (b.–d.)	21 August 1830 – 31 May 1833	Unaffiliated
13		José Rafael Revilla (b.–d.)	31 May 1833 – 28 July 1833	Unaffiliated
14		José Isidro Madero (b.–d.)	28 July 1833 – 30 November 1833	Unaffiliated
15		José Rafael Revilla (b.–d.)	30 November 1833 – 13 December 1833	Unaffiliated
16		José María Sánchez Pareja (b.–d.)	13 December 1833 – 17 February 1834	Unaffiliated
17		José Isidro Madero (b.–d.)	17 February 1834 – 20 August 1834	Unaffiliated
18		Simón Elías González (1772–1841)	21 August 1834 – 18 September 1834	Unaffiliated
19		José Joaquín Calvo (1797–1838)	18 September 1834 – 11 June 1835	Unaffiliated
20		José María Echavarría (b.–d.)	11 June 1835 – 14 August 1835	Unaffiliated
21		José Joaquín Calvo (1797–1838)	14 August 1835 – 11 August 1836	Unaffiliated
22		José María Bear (b.–d.)	11 August 1836 – 15 August 1836	Unaffiliated
23		José Joaquín Calvo (1797–1838)	15 August 1836 – 17 April 1837	Unaffiliated
24		Simón Elías González (1772–1841)	18 April 1837 – 3 July 1838	Unaffiliated
25		Berardo Revilla (b.–d.)	3 July 1838 – 16 July 1838	Unaffiliated
26		Simón Elías González (1772–1841)	16 July 1838 – 3 October 1838	Unaffiliated
27		Mariano Orcasitas (1782–1839)	3 October 1838 – 15 October 1838	Unaffiliated
28		Berardo Revilla (b.–d.)	15 October 1838 – 1 January 1839	Unaffiliated
29		José María Irigoyen Rodríguez (1795–1846)	1 January 1839 – 22 January 1839	Unaffiliated
30		Simón Elías González (1772–1841)	22 January 1839 – 22 May 1839	Unaffiliated
31		José María Irigoyen de la O (1807–1840)	22 May 1839 – 14 June 1839	Unaffiliated
32		José María Irigoyen Rodríguez (1795–1846)	14 June 1839 – 18 September 1839	Unaffiliated
33		José María Irigoyen de la O (1807–1840)	18 September 1839 – 20 May 1840	Unaffiliated
34		Pedro Olivares Nájera (b.–d.)	20 May 1840 – 6 July 1840	Unaffiliated
35		Francisco García Conde (b.–d.)	6 July 1840 – 27 September 1842	Unaffiliated
36		Mariano Martínez de Lejarza (1808–1854)	27 September 1842 – 3 October 1842	Unaffiliated
37		Francisco García Conde (b.–d.)	3 October 1842 – 8 December 1842	Unaffiliated
38		Mariano Monterde (1789–1861)	8 December 1842 – 26 June 1843	Unaffiliated
39		Mariano Martínez de Lejarza (1808–1854)	26 June 1843 – 29 August 1843	Unaffiliated
40		Mariano Monterde (1789–1861)	29 August 1843 – 20 January 1845	Unaffiliated
41		Luis Zuloaga (b.–d.)	20 January 1845 – 13 June 1845	Unaffiliated
42		Joaquín de Bustamante (b.–d.)	13 June 1845 – 21 June 1845	Unaffiliated
43		Pedro Olivares Nájera (b.–d.)	21 June 1845 – 24 August 1845	Unaffiliated
44		Ángel Trías Álvarez (1809–1867)	24 August 1845 – 17 January 1846	Liberal
45		Mauricio Ugarte (b.–d.)	17 January 1846 – 16 February 1846	Unaffiliated
46		Cayetano Justiniani (b.–d.)	16 February 1846 – 4 May 1846	Unaffiliated
47		José María Irigoyen Rodríguez (1795–1846)	4 May 1846 – 25 August 1846	Unaffiliated
48		Ángel Trías Álvarez (1809–1867)	25 August 1846 – 23 February 1847	Liberal
49		Laureano Muñoz Arregui (1815–1884)	23 February 1847 – 18 April 1847	Unaffiliated
50		José María Sánchez Pareja (b.–d.)	18 April 1847 – 15 May 1847	Unaffiliated
51		Laureano Muñoz Arregui (1815–1884)	15 May 1847 – 13 September 1847	Unaffiliated
52		Ángel Trías Álvarez (1809–1867)	13 September 1847 – 16 March 1848	Liberal
53		Laureano Muñoz Arregui (1815–1884)	16 March 1848 – 2 May 1848	Unaffiliated
54		Ángel Trías Álvarez (1809–1867)	2 May 1848 – 18 September 1848	Liberal
55		Laureano Muñoz Arregui (1815–1884)	18 September 1848 – 21 March 1849	Unaffiliated
56		Ángel Trías Álvarez (1809–1867)	21 March 1849 – 20 November 1850	Liberal
57		Juan Nepomuceno de Urquidi (b.–d.)	20 November 1850 – 6 January 1852	Unaffiliated
58		José Cordero y Ponce de León (b.–d.)	6 January 1852 – 23 December 1852	Unaffiliated
59		Ángel Trías Álvarez (1809–1867)	23 December 1852 – 5 April 1853	Liberal
60		Luis Zuloaga (b.–d.)	5 April 1853 – 2 November 1853	Unaffiliated
61		Ángel Trías Álvarez (1809–1867)	2 November 1853 – 29 November 1855	Liberal
62		Juan Nepomuceno de Urquidi (b.–d.)	29 November 1855 – 11 February 1856	Unaffiliated
63		Jesús María Palacios Arregui (b.–d.)	11 February 1856 – 2 November 1856	Unaffiliated
64		Berardo Revilla (b.–d.)	2 November 1856 – 22 July 1857	Unaffiliated
65		José María Jaurrieta Rincón (b.–d.)	22 July 1857 – 9 August 1857	Unaffiliated
66		Antonio Ochoa (b.–d.)	9 August 1857 – 17 January 1860	Unaffiliated
67		José Eligio Muñoz (b.–d.)	17 January 1860 – 20 September 1860	Unaffiliated
68		Luis Terrazas (1829–1923)	21 September 1860 – 29 April 1864	Liberal
69		Jesús José Casavantes (1809–1883)	29 April 1864 – 11 June 1864	Liberal
70		Ángel Trías Álvarez (1809–1867)	11 June 1864 – 14 July 1865	Liberal
71		Francisco Ortiz de Zárate (b.–d.)	14 July 1865 – 4 August 1865	Unaffiliated
72		Manuel Ojinaga (b.–d.)	4 August 1865 – 2 September 1865	Liberal
73		Agustín Villagra Sánchez (b.–d.)	14 September 1865 – 1 November 1865	Unaffiliated
74		Luis Terrazas (1829–1923)	1 November 1865 – 24 September 1872	Liberal
75		Manuel Gómez y Luna (b.–d.)	24 September 1872 – 3 November 1872	Unaffiliated
76		Luis Terrazas (1829–1923)	3 November 1872 – 1 September 1873	Liberal
77		Juan B. Escudero (b.–d.)	1 September 1873 – 1 October 1873	Unaffiliated
78		Luis Terrazas (1829–1923)	1 October 1873 – 3 October 1873	Liberal
79		Antonio Ochoa (b.–d.)	4 October 1873 – 2 July 1876	Unaffiliated
80		Manuel de Herrera (b.–d.)	2 July 1876 – 26 September 1876	Unaffiliated
81		Antonio Ochoa (b.–d.)	26 September 1876 – 3 October 1876	Unaffiliated
82		Mariano Samaniego (1831–1905)	3 October 1876 – 5 February 1877	Liberal
83		Juan B. Caamaño (b.–d.)	5 February 1877 – 19 February 1877	Unaffiliated
84		José Eligio Muñoz (b.–d.)	19 February 1877 – 13 June 1877	Unaffiliated
85		Pedro Hinojosa (1822–1903)	13 June 1877 – 14 August 1877	Liberal
86		Ángel Trías Ochoa (b.–d.)	14 August 1877 – 12 November 1879	Unaffiliated
87		Luis Terrazas (1829–1923)	12 November 1879 – 23 March 1880	Liberal
88		Gabriel Aguirre del Hierro (b.–d.)	23 March 1880 – 27 May 1880	Unaffiliated
89		Luis Terrazas (1829–1923)	27 May 1880 – 18 August 1881	Liberal
90		Mariano Samaniego (1831–1905)	18 August 1881 – 18 October 1881	Liberal
91		Luis Terrazas (1829–1923)	18 October 1881 – 6 November 1882	Liberal
92		Mariano Samaniego (1831–1905)	6 November 1882 – 6 May 1883	Liberal
93		Luis Terrazas (1829–1923)	6 May 1883 – 9 January 1884	Liberal
94		Ramón Cuéllar Aranda (b.–d.)	9 January 1884 – 9 April 1884	Unaffiliated
95		Celso González Esquivel (b.–d.)	9 April 1884 – 3 October 1884	Unaffiliated
96		Carlos Pacheco Villalobos (1839–1891)	4 October 1884 – 9 December 1884	Liberal
97		Carlos Fuero (1844–1892)	9 December 1884 – 28 July 1885	Liberal
98		Félix Francisco Maceyra (b.–d.)	28 July 1885 – 11 June 1887	Unaffiliated
99		Carlos Pacheco Villalobos (1839–1891)	11 June 1887 – 30 July 1887	Liberal
100		Lauro Carrillo (b.–d.)	30 July 1887 – 31 December 1887	Unaffiliated
101		Celso González Esquivel (b.–d.)	31 December 1887 – 31 January 1888	Unaffiliated
102		Lauro Carrillo (b.–d.)	31 January 1888 – 28 May 1888	Unaffiliated
103		Celso González Esquivel (b.–d.)	28 May 1888 – 13 July 1888	Unaffiliated
104		Lauro Carrillo (b.–d.)	13 July 1888 – 26 October 1888	Unaffiliated
105		Manuel de Herrera (b.–d.)	26 October 1888 – 26 December 1888	Unaffiliated
106		Lauro Carrillo (b.–d.)	26 December 1888 – 1 October 1889	Unaffiliated
107		Mauro Cándano Benítez (b.–d.)	1 October 1889 – 27 November 1889	Unaffiliated
108		Lauro Carrillo (b.–d.)	27 November 1889 – 11 April 1890	Unaffiliated
109		Rafael Pimentel (1855–1929)	11 April 1890 – 26 May 1890	Unaffiliated
110		Lauro Carrillo (b.–d.)	26 May 1890 – 5 July 1890	Unaffiliated
111		Rafael Pimentel (1855–1929)	5 July 1890 – 12 July 1890	Unaffiliated
112		Lauro Carrillo (b.–d.)	12 July 1890 – 28 October 1890	Unaffiliated
113		Rafael Pimentel (1855–1929)	28 October 1890 – 24 February 1891	Unaffiliated
114		Lauro Carrillo (b.–d.)	24 February 1891 – 11 June 1891	Unaffiliated
115		Alejandro Guerrero y Porres (b.–d.)	11 June 1891 – 11 July 1891	Unaffiliated
116		Lauro Carrillo (b.–d.)	11 July 1891 – 10 November 1891	Unaffiliated
117		Rafael Pimentel (1855–1929)	10 November 1891 – 10 December 1891	Unaffiliated
118		Lauro Carrillo (b.–d.)	10 December 1891 – 11 April 1892	Unaffiliated
119		Rafael Pimentel (1855–1929)	11 April 1892 – 28 April 1892	Unaffiliated
120		Lauro Carrillo (b.–d.)	28 April 1892 – 4 June 1892	Unaffiliated
121		Rafael Pimentel (1855–1929)	4 June 1892 – 3 October 1892	Unaffiliated
122		Miguel Ahumada (1845–1916)	4 October 1892 – 27 February 1903	Unaffiliated
123		Joaquín Cortázar (b.–d.)	27 February 1903 – 27 May 1903	Unaffiliated
124		Luis Terrazas (1829–1923)	27 May 1903 – 18 August 1904	Unaffiliated
125		Enrique Creel Cuilty (1854–1931)	18 August 1904 – 8 December 1906	Unaffiliated
126		José María Sánchez González (1850–1940)	8 December 1906 – 3 October 1907	Unaffiliated
127		Enrique Creel Cuilty (b.–d.)	3 October 1907 – 28 April 1910	Unaffiliated
128		José María Sánchez González (1850–1940)	28 April 1910 – 6 December 1910	Unaffiliated
129		Alberto Terrazas Cuilty (1869–1926)	6 December 1910 – 31 January 1911	Unaffiliated
130		Miguel Ahumada (1845–1916)	31 January 1911 – June 1911	Unaffiliated
131		Abraham González Casavantes (1864–1913)	June 1911 – 1911	PCP
132		Aureliano L. González (b.–d.)	1911 – 1912	Unaffiliated
133		Abraham González Casavantes (1864–1913)	1912 – 1912	PCP
134		Felipe R. Gutiérrez (b.–d.)	1912 – 1912	Unaffiliated
135		Abraham González Casavantes (1864–1913)	1912 – 7 March 1913	PCP
136		Antonio Rábago (1861–1915)	7 March 1913 – 30 May 1913	Unaffiliated
137		Salvador R. Mercado (1864–1936)	30 May 1913 – 8 December 1913	Unaffiliated
138		Francisco Villa (1878–1923)	8 December 1913 – January 1914	Unaffiliated
139		Manuel Chao (1883–1924)	January 1914 – 13 March 1914	Unaffiliated
140		Fidel Ávila (1870–1954)	13 March 1914 – 1914	Unaffiliated
141		Silvestre Terrazas (b.–d.)	1914 – 1914	Unaffiliated
142		Fidel Ávila (1870–1954)	1914 – 1915	Unaffiliated
143		Silvestre Terrazas (b.–d.)	1915 – 1915	Unaffiliated
144		Ignacio C. Enríquez (1889–1972)	1915 – 12 May 1916	Unaffiliated
145		Francisco L. Treviño (1887–1937)	12 May 1916 – 5 December 1916	Unaffiliated
146		Arnulfo González (1886–1962)	5 December 1916 – 2 April 1917	Unaffiliated
147		Enrique Alcalá (b.–d.)	2 April 1917 – 9 May 1917	Unaffiliated
148		Arnulfo González (1886–1962)	9 May 1917 – 26 February 1918	Unaffiliated
149		Manuel Herrera Marmolejo (b.–d.)	26 February 1918 – 30 April 1918	Unaffiliated
150		Arnulfo González (1886–1962)	30 April 1918 – 3 July 1918	Unaffiliated
151		Ignacio C. Enríquez (1889–1972)	3 July 1918 – 8 October 1918	Unaffiliated
152		Ramón Gómez y Salas (b.–d.)	8 October 1918 – 28 October 1918	Unaffiliated
153		Ignacio C. Enríquez (1889–1972)	28 October 1918 – 14 November 1918	Unaffiliated
154		Andrés Ortiz Arriola (1890.–1945)	14 November 1918 – 24 February 1919	Unaffiliated
155		Melquiades Angulo (1889–1966)	24 February 1919 – 28 March 1919	Unaffiliated
156		Andrés Ortiz Arriola (1890.–1945.)	28 March 1919 – 29 July 1919	Unaffiliated
157		Melquiades Angulo (1889–1966)	29 July 1919 – 10 August 1919	Unaffiliated
158		Andrés Ortiz Arriola (b.–d.)	10 August 1919 – 23 September 1919	Unaffiliated
159		Melquiades Angulo (1889–1966)	23 September 1919 – 25 October 1919	Unaffiliated
160		Andrés Ortiz Arriola (b.–d.)	25 October 1919 – 8 January 1920	Unaffiliated
161		Melquiades Angulo (1889–1966)	8 January 1920 – 31 January 1920	Unaffiliated
162		Andrés Ortiz Arriola (b.–d.)	31 January 1920 – 29 February 1920	Unaffiliated
163		Melquiades Angulo (1889–1966)	29 February 1920 – 13 March 1920	Unaffiliated
164		Emilio Salinas (1864–1927)	13 March 1920 – 26 April 1920	Unaffiliated
165		Alfonso Gómez Luna (b.–d.)	26 April 1920 – 8 May 1920	Unaffiliated
166		Abel S. Rodríguez (1875–1955)	8 May 1920 – 19 May 1920	Unaffiliated
167		Tomás Gameros (b.–d.)	19 May 1920 – 14 June 1920	Unaffiliated
168		Abel S. Rodríguez (1875–1955)	14 June 1920 – 3 October 1920	Unaffiliated
169		Ignacio C. Enríquez (1889–1972)	4 October 1920 – 15 January 1921	Unaffiliated
170		Efrén Valdez (b.–d.)	15 January 1921 – 25 January 1921	Unaffiliated
171		Ignacio C. Enríquez (1889–1972)	25 January 1921 – 20 July 1921	Unaffiliated
172		Rómulo Alvelais (b.–d.)	20 July 1921 – 11 August 1921	Unaffiliated
173		Ignacio C. Enríquez (1889–1972)	11 August 1921 – 2 December 1921	Unaffiliated
174		Pedro S. Olivas (b.–d.)	2 December 1921 – 16 December 1921	Unaffiliated
175		Ignacio C. Enríquez (1889–1972)	16 December 1921 – 22 March 1923	Unaffiliated
176		Rómulo Alvelais (b.–d.)	22 March 1923 – 1923	Unaffiliated
177		José Acosta Rivera (b.–d.)	1923 – 10 May 1923	Unaffiliated
178		Ignacio C. Enríquez (1889–1972)	10 May 1923 – 23 May 1923	Unaffiliated
179		José Acosta Rivera (b.–d.)	23 May 1923 – 1 June 1923	Unaffiliated
180		Ignacio C. Enríquez (1889–1972)	1 June 1923 – 23 October 1923	Unaffiliated
181		Rómulo Alvelais (b.–d.)	23 October 1923 – 12 December 1923	Unaffiliated
18		Ignacio C. Enríquez (1889–1972)	12 December 1923 – 22 December 1923	Unaffiliated
182		Reinaldo Talavera (b.–d.)	22 December 1923 – 22 March 1924	Unaffiliated
18		Ignacio C. Enríquez (1889–1972)	22 March 1924 – 5 April 1924	Unaffiliated
183		Reinaldo Talavera (b.–d.)	5 April 1924 – 1924	Unaffiliated
184		Vicente N. Mendoza (1876–1940)	1924 – 1924	Unaffiliated
185		Reinaldo Talavera (b.–d.)	1924 – 1924	Unaffiliated
186		Jesús Antonio Almeida (1885-1957)	1924 – 1924	Unaffiliated
187		Vicente N. Mendoza (1876–1940)	1924 – 1924	Unaffiliated
188		Jesús Antonio Almeida (1885-1957)	1924 – 1925	Unaffiliated
189		Vicente N. Mendoza (1876–1940)	1925 – 1925	Unaffiliated
190		Jesús Antonio Almeida (1885-1957)	1925 – 4 Oct 1925	Unaffiliated
191		Jorge M. Cárdenas Amaya (b.–d.)	4 Oct 1925 – 3 Nov 1925	Unaffiliated
192		Jesús Antonio Almeida (1885-1957)	3 Nov 1925 – 1926	Unaffiliated
193		Mariano Guillén (b.–d.)	1926 – 1926	Unaffiliated
194		Jesús Antonio Almeida (1885-1957)	1926 – 1927	Unaffiliated
195		Manuel Mascareñas (b.–d.)	1927 – 1927	Unaffiliated
196		Fernando Orozco (b.–d.)	1927 – 1928	Unaffiliated
197		Marcelo Caraveo (1883–1955)	1928 – 13 April 1929	Unaffiliated
198		Luis L. León (1890-1981)	13 April 1929 – 3 July 1929	PNR
199		Francisco R. Almada (1896–1989)	3 July 1929 – 9 November 1929	PNR
200		Luis L. León (1890–1981)	9 November 1929 – 6 December 1929	PNR
201		Francisco R. Almada (1896–1989)	6 December 1929 – 15 July 1930	PNR
202		Rómulo Escobar Zerman (1872–1946)	15 July 1930 – 14 August 1930	PNR
203		Francisco R. Almada (1896–1989)	14 August 1930 – 1930	PNR
204		Andrés Ortiz Arriola (b.–d.)	1930 – 1930	PNR
205		Pascual García (b.–d.)	1930 – 1930	PNR
206		Andrés Ortiz Arriola (b.–d.)	1930 – 1930	PNR
207		Pascual García (b.–d.)	1930 – 1930	PNR
208		Andrés Ortiz Arriola (b.–d.)	1930 – 1931	PNR
209		Pascual García (b.–d.)	1931 – 1931	PNR
210		Andrés Ortiz Arriola (b.–d.)	1931 – 1931	PNR
211		Pascual García (b.–d.)	1931 – 1931	PNR
212		Andrés Ortiz Arriola (b.–d.)	1931 – 1931	PNR
213		Pascual García (b.–d.)	1931 – 1931	PNR
214		Andrés Ortiz Arriola (b.–d.)	1931 – 1931	PNR
215		Pascual García (b.–d.)	1931 – 1931	PNR
216		Andrés Ortiz Arriola (b.–d.)	1931 – 2 November 1931	PNR
217		Roberto Fierro Villalobos (1897–1985)	2 November 1931 – 4 July 1932	PNR
218		Eduardo Salido (b.–d.)	4 July 1932 – 4 October 1932	PNR
219		Rodrigo M. Quevedo (1889–1967)	4 October 1932 – 3 October 1936	PNR
220		Gustavo L. Talamantes (1891–1958)	4 October 1936 – 3 October 1940	PNR
221		Alfredo Chávez Amparán (1891–1972)	4 October 1940 – 1944	PRM
222		Fernando Foglio Miramontes (1906–1973)	1944 – 3 October 1950	PRM
223		Óscar Soto Maynez (1904–1975)	4 October 1950 – 9 August 1955	PRI
224		Jesús Lozoya Solís (1910–1983)	10 August 1955 – 3 October 1956	PRI
225		Teófilo Borunda (1912–2001)	4 October 1956 – 3 October 1962	PRI
226		Práxedes Giner Durán (1893–1978)	4 October 1962 – 3 October 1968	PRI
227		Oscar Flores Sánchez (1907–1986)	4 October 1968 – 3 October 1974	PRI
228		Manuel Bernardo Aguirre (1908–1999)	4 October 1974 – 3 October 1980	PRI
229		Oscar Ornelas Küchle (1919–2000)	4 October 1980 – 19 September 1985	PRI
230		Saúl González Herrera (1915–2006)	19 September 1985 – 3 October 1986	PRI
231		Fernando Baeza Meléndez (1942)	4 October 1986 – 3 October 1992	PRI
232		Francisco Barrio Terrazas (1950-2025)	4 October 1992 – 3 October 1998	PAN
233		Patricio Martínez García (1948)	4 October 1998 – 3 October 2003	PRI
234		José Reyes Baeza Terrazas (1961)	4 October 2004 – 3 October 2010	PRI
235		César Duarte (1963)	4 October 2010 – 3 October 2016	PRI
236		Javier Corral (1966)	4 October 2016 – 7 September 2021	PAN
237		Maru Campos (1975)	8 September 2021 – Today	PAN
