= 7th federal electoral district of Chihuahua =

Federal electoral district of Mexico

Chihuahua's 7th
- Electoral district of the Chamber of Deputies of Mexico

- Chihuahua's 7th district since 2022

Incumbent
- Member: Roberto Corral Ordóñez
- Party: ▌Labour Party
- Congress: 66th (2024–2027)

District
- State: Chihuahua
- Head town: Ciudad Cuauhtémoc
- Coordinates: 28°24′N 106°52′W
- Covers: 19 municipalities: Bachíniva, Buenaventura, Casas Grandes, Cuauhtémoc, Cusihuiriachi, Galeana, Santa Isabel, Gómez Farías, Gran Morelos, Guerrero, Ignacio Zaragoza, Madera, Matachí, Moris, Namiquipa, Nuevo Casas Grandes, Ocampo, Riva Palacio, Temósachic
- PR region: First
- Precincts: 509
- Population: 431,078 (2020 census)

7th district in 2017–2022

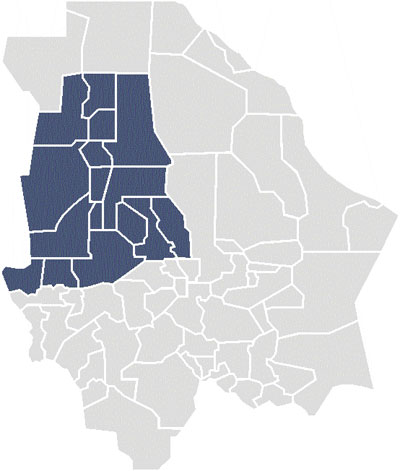
7th district in 2005–2017

The 7th federal electoral district of Chihuahua (Spanish: Distrito electoral federal 07 de Chihuahua) is one of the 300 electoral districts into which Mexico is divided for elections to the federal Chamber of Deputies and one of nine such districts in the state of Chihuahua.

It elects one deputy to the lower house of Congress for each three-year legislative session by means of the first-past-the-post system. Votes cast in the district also count towards the calculation of proportional representation ("plurinominal") deputies elected from the first region.

Suspended in 1930, (Note: An amendment to Article 52 of the Constitution in 1928 changed the original provision of "one deputy per 60,000 inhabitants" to "one deputy per 100,000"; as a result, the size of the Chamber of Deputies fell from 281 in the 1928 election to 171 in 1934.) the 7th district was re-established as part of the 1977 electoral reforms. Under the 1975 districting plan, Chihuahua had only six congressional districts; with the 1977 reforms, the number increased to ten. The restored 7th district elected its first deputy in the 1979 mid-term election.

The current member for the district, elected in the 2024 general election, is Jesús Roberto Corral Ordóñez of the Labour Party (PT).

== District territory ==
Under the 2023 districting plan adopted by the National Electoral Institute (INE), which is to be used for the 2024, 2027 and 2030 federal elections, the district is located in the centre-west portion of the state, and comprises 509 electoral precincts (secciones electorales) across 19 municipalities:

- Bachíniva, Buenaventura, Casas Grandes, Cuauhtémoc, Cusihuiriachi, Galeana, Santa Isabel, Gómez Farías, Gran Morelos, Guerrero, Ignacio Zaragoza, Madera, Matachí, Moris, Namiquipa, Nuevo Casas Grandes, Ocampo, Riva Palacio and Temósachic.

Its head town (cabecera distrital), where results from individual polling stations are gathered together and tallied, is the city of Ciudad Cuauhtémoc. The district reported a population of 431,078 in the 2020 census.

== Previous districting schemes ==
Evolution of electoral district numbers
| | 1974 | 1978 | 1996 | 2005 | 2017 | 2023 |
|---|---|---|---|---|---|---|
| Chihuahua | 6 | 10 | 9 | 9 | 9 | 9 |
| Chamber of Deputies | 196 | 300 | | | | |

2017–2022
Between 2017 and 2022, the 7th district covered a different configuration of municipalities in the centre and west of the state: Bachíniva, Bocoyna, Cuauhtémoc, Cusihuiriachi, Chínipas, Santa Isabel, Gómez Farías, Gran Morelos, Guazapares, Guerrero, Madera, Maguarichi, Matachí, Moris, Namiquipa, Ocampo, Riva Palacio, Temósachic and Uruachi. Ciudad Cuauhtémoc served as its head town.

2005–2017
Under the 2005 districting scheme, the 7th district covered the municipalities of Bachíniva, Buenaventura, Casas Grandes, Cuauhtémoc, Galeana, Gómez Farías, Guerrero, Ignacio Zaragoza, Madera, Matachí, Moris, Namiquipa, Nuevo Casas Grandes, Ocampo, Riva Palacio and Temósachi in the west of the state. The head town was Ciudad Cuauhtémoc.

1996–2005
Chihuahua lost its 10th district in the 1996 redistricting process. Between 1996 and 2005, the 7th district was located in the centre-west portion of the state and comprised mostly municipalities of the Sierra Tarahumara region: Bachíniva, Batopilas, Bocoyna, Carichí, Chínipas, Cuauhtémoc, Cusihuiriachi, Dr. Belisario Domínguez, Gran Morelos, Guazapares, Guerrero, Maguarichi, Moris, Nonoava, Ocampo, Riva Palacio, San Francisco de Borja, Santa Isabel, Satevó, Uruachi and Urique.

1978–1996
The districting scheme in force from 1978 to 1996 was the result of the 1977 electoral reforms, which increased the number of single-member seats in the Chamber of Deputies from 196 to 300. Under that plan, Chihuahua's seat allocation rose from six to ten. The restored 7th district comprised the southern portion of the state capital, the city of Chihuahua, the rural areas of its surrounding municipality, and the municipalities of Aldama, Aquiles Serdán, Santa Isabel, (Note: The municipality of Santa Isabel was called "General Trías" at the time.) Julimes and Meoqui.

== Deputies returned to Congress ==
(Mexico) National parties
- Current
- PAN
- PRI
- PT
- PVEM
- MC
- Morena
- PAZ
- Somos
- Defunct or local only
- PLM
- PNR
- PRM
- PNM
- PP
- PPS
- PARM
- PFCRN
- CON
- PANAL
- PSD
- PES
- PES
- PRD

Chihuahua's 7th district
| Election | Deputy | Party | Term | Legislature |
|---|---|---|---|---|
The 7th district was suspended between 1930 and 1979
| 1979 | Demetrio Bernardo Franco Derma | Institutional Revolutionary Party | 1979–1982 | 51st Congress |
| 1982 | Juan Manuel Terrazas Sánchez | Institutional Revolutionary Party | 1982–1985 | 52nd Congress |
| 1985 | Jorge Doroteo Zapata | Institutional Revolutionary Party | 1985–1988 | 53rd Congress |
| 1988 | Carlos Barranco Fuentes | Institutional Revolutionary Party | 1988–1991 | 54th Congress |
| 1991 | Eloy Gómez Pando | Institutional Revolutionary Party | 1991–1994 | 55th Congress |
| 1994 | Mario de la Torre Hernández | Institutional Revolutionary Party | 1994–1997 | 56th Congress |
| 1997 | Odórico Vázquez Bernal | Institutional Revolutionary Party | 1997–2000 | 57th Congress |
| 2000 | Jorge Esteban Sandoval | Institutional Revolutionary Party | 2000–2003 | 58th Congress |
| 2003 | Jorge Castillo Cabrera | Institutional Revolutionary Party | 2003–2006 | 59th Congress |
| 2006 | Israel Beltrán Montes | Institutional Revolutionary Party | 2006–2009 | 60th Congress |
| 2009 | Guadalupe Pérez Domínguez | Institutional Revolutionary Party | 2009–2012 | 61st Congress |
| 2012 | Kamel Athie Flores | Institutional Revolutionary Party | 2012–2015 | 62nd Congress |
| 2015 | Alex Le Baron González | Institutional Revolutionary Party | 2015–2018 | 63rd Congress |
| 2018 | Eraclio Rodríguez Gómez (Note: Rodríguez Gómez switched allegiance from Morena to the PT on 30 June 2020.) | National Regeneration Movement Labour Party (Mexico) | 2018–2021 | 64th Congress |
| 2021 | Patricia Terrazas Baca | National Action Party (Mexico) | 2021–2024 | 65th Congress |
| 2024 | Jesús Roberto Corral Ordóñez | Labour Party (Mexico) | 2024–2027 | 66th Congress |

=== Congressional results ===
The corresponding page on the Spanish-language Wikipedia contains full electoral results from 1979 to 2021.

2 July 2006 general election: Chihuahua's 7th
| Party or Alliance | | Candidate | | Votes | Percentage |
|---|---|---|---|---|---|
| | National Action Party | | Jeffrey Jones | 36,863 | 28.10 / 100 |
| | Alliance for Mexico (PRI, PVEM) | ✓ | Israel Beltrán Montes | 56,327 | 42.93 / 100 |
| | Coalition for the Good of All (PRD, PT, Convergencia) | | Víctor Quintana Silveyra | 27.782 | 21.18 / 100 |
| | New Alliance Party | | Austreberta Bustamante Grajeda | 6,855 | 3.72 / 100 |
| | Social Democratic and Peasant Alternative | | Ramiro Encontrías Ontiveros | 1,100 | 0.84 / 100 |
| ✗ | Unregistered candidates | | | 137 | 0.10 / 100 |
| ✗ | Spoilt papers | | | 4,113 | 3.13 / 100 |
| Total | | | | 131,195 | 100 / 100 |
Source: IFE.

== Presidential elections ==
Chihuahua's 7th district
| Election | District won by | Party or coalition | % |
|---|---|---|---|
| 2018 | Andrés Manuel López Obrador | Juntos Haremos Historia | 46.3930 |
| 2024 | Claudia Sheinbaum Pardo | Sigamos Haciendo Historia | 48.2632 |
