= Máximo Castillo =

Mexican brigadier general (1864-1919)

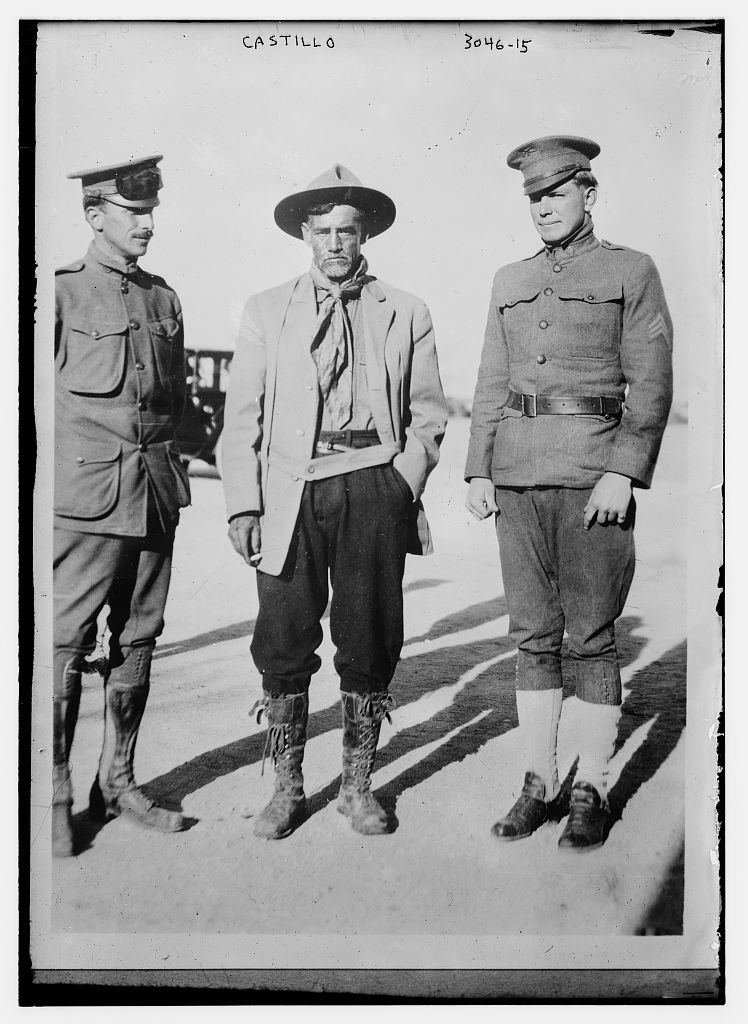
General Maximo Castillo

General Máximo Castillo (1864–1919) was a brigadier general in the Mexican Revolution (ca. 1910-1920) who fought for agrarian reform in Northern Mexico. Castillo was born poor and worked as an itinerant farm worker for part of his life. Upon returning to his native Chihuahua, Castillo joined the Mexican Revolution and became Francisco Madero's personal bodyguard. Disillusioned by the slowness of Madero's reforms once he gained power, Castillo quickly joined the armed opposition to the Madero government. He was imprisoned in the United States after the government had accused him of sabotaging a train. In his internment, he wrote a series of memoirs which form the basis from which historians study his life today. He died at the age of 55.

== Early life ==
Máximo Castillo was born on May 11, 1864, on his grandfather's ranch in Chihuahua outside the village of San Nicolás de Carretas (now Gran Morelos). The ranch was home to nearly four thousand mestizos, including his parents who owned several small tracts of land. At eighteen, he married María de Jesús Flores. Though he was a literate and respected campesino, he, his wife, and their two children struggled financially. Castillo declined to become mayor of the village in 1895, and worked instead as a blacksmith and a miner before moving to Chihuahua City in 1901. He then spent several years as a migrant farm worker in the United States. Castillo's travels in the United States radicalized him.

== The Mexican Revolution ==
Upon returning to his family in 1908, Castillo began to challenge the dictatorship of General Porfirio Díaz. He had been strongly influenced by the writings of Díaz's recent political rival Francisco I. Madero. He joined Madero's revolution in 1910 and quickly became his personal bodyguard. In March 1911, Madero laid siege to Casas Grandes where he was reported wounded, although this was later denied. Castillo saved his life, but their forces were repelled by Diaz's troops. Just two months later, however, revolutionary forces captured Ciudad Juarez, putting an end to the Diaz government. Madero was elected to the Presidency in October of the same year. Castillo declined a prominent position in the capital and instead returned home with orders from Madero to bring order to the region. There, he replaced unpopular local officials with those supported by rurales, but he was not as successful in addressing local banditry.

Castillo was bothered by the slow pace of reform under the new regime. On February 2, 1912, Castillo and other revolutionary leaders signed the Plan of Santa Rosa which called for radical economic and political changes in Mexico. Just a few weeks later, Castillo also signed on to the Plan of the Empacadora which inaugurated armed resistance against the Madero government. Madero dispatched General Victoriano Huerta to fight the insurgents. After Madero was assassinated and Huerta ascended to the Presidency, he made an alliance with Pascual Orozco, one of the revolutionary leaders. Castillo opposed alliances with this new government, but lacked the troops and supplies to challenge it effectively. Instead, he turned his attention to northern Mexico.

While displeased with Madero and Huerta, Castillo strongly supported the land reforms of Emiliano Zapata, the revolutionary leader from Morelos in the south. Castillo and Zapata met briefly in 1911, a meeting which deeply impressed Castillo. In March 1913, Castillo met in El Paso with Emilio Vázquez Gómez, a national leader in the Zapatista movement, which Castillo pledged to support in the North. Awarded the rank of brigadier general, he vowed to Gómez, “I have suffered for those ideals, and I have sworn on my honor as well as that of my children to fight until death or victory.”

== Imprisonment ==
Beginning in 1913, Castillo and his followers began targeting American mining, lumber, and railway interests that had invested in northern Mexico. They hoped to acquire needed supplies in order to maintain their army. One target was the store of Romney & Farnsworth from which he took money and goods and which was operated in part by Gaskell Romney, grandfather of the American politician Mitt Romney. Eventually, Castillo moved into the American state of New Mexico where he was promptly captured by American troops and confined in Fort Bliss, east of El Paso.

In prison, the United States government blamed Castillo for the tragedy at Cumbre Tunnel. On February 4, 1914, a gang of bandits had deliberately caused a passenger train to plow into empty freight cars that had been detained and set on fire in the Cumbre railway tunnel in Chihuahua. Upwards of fifty-five people, including over twenty Americans, died in the conflagration. The United States government interrogated Castillo but was unable to connect him to the tragedy. Pancho Villa, at this time strongly opposed to Castillo and his radical reforms, threatened to murder Castillo if he was released. Villa's wife, Luz Corral y Villa, however, who had once been befriended by Castillo, denied his guilt. In an interview, she stated that, "I cannot believe that that man with the gentle face and smiling eyes could have committed such a crime." Modern historians agree that Castillo was innocent.

In prison, Castillo wrote a series of memoirs which historians have recently rediscovered. The memoirs mainly consist of Castillo's description of the Mexican Revolution and its various leaders.

== Death and legacy ==
After two years of imprisonment, the United States government sent Castillo to exile in Cuba. He left the country aboard the steamship Excelsior in January 1916. Little is known of him in the final years before his death. In 1919, at fifty-five years of age, he died, followed by his wife three years later in the city of Chihuahua, where schools and streets honor his life.
