= School of Missions Mobilization =

School in Matachi, Chihuahua, Mexico

The School of Missions Mobilization, also known as El Instituto de Movilización Misionera, is located in Matachi, Chihuahua, Mexico. It has been established, and is administrated by Hillside Missions Organization in Richmond, Virginia. The school's purpose is to become a community of men and women prepared to reach others. The primary goal of the school is to equip Latin-Americans to establish Christian community among unreached people groups.

== History ==
The inauguration ceremony of the School of Missions Mobilization was in March 2007, and the first generation of students graduated in March 2009. The invitation to work with the school is open, and applications are currently being accepted by the school's leadership board. The website states that anyone who speaks Spanish, and who would like to be involved in an Evangelical Christian Church is encouraged to get involved with the school.

== The Program and Curriculum ==
The school is an interdenominational project supported by both churches and individuals in Mexico. It offers a one or two-year residency program during which the students study missions subjects and theology. They live in dormitories on the school's campus. After graduation, students go into the mission field for a minimum of two months to get field experience to pair with the training they have received from the school.
