= Brickellia lewisii =

Scientific classification
- Kingdom: Plantae
- Clade: Tracheophytes
- Clade: Angiosperms
- Clade: Eudicots
- Clade: Asterids
- Order: Asterales
- Family: Asteraceae
- Genus: Brickellia
- Species: B. lewisii

Binomial name
- Brickellia lewisii B.L.Turner

Species of flowering plant

Brickellia lewisii is a Mexican species of flowering plants in the family Asteraceae. It is native to Basaseachic Falls National Park in the state of Chihuahua in northern Mexico. The plant grows on hillsides and streambanks just above the waterfall at an elevation of about 2100 meters (7000 feet).

Brickellia lewisii is a perennial subshrub up to 30 cm (12 inches) tall with many small, nodding (hanging) flower heads.

The species is named for US botanist Paul Lewis.
