= Santa Isabel massacre =

Massacre in Chihuahua, Mexico, in 1916

- Part of the Mexican Revolution
- Santa Isabel in the Mexican state of Chihuahua
- Date: January 10, 1916
- Location: Santa Isabel, Chihuahua, Mexico
- Perpetrators: Mexican bandits led by Pablo Lopez and aligned with Pancho Villa
- Outcome: Around 16 Americans killed, one American survives

The Santa Isabel massacre took place on January 10, 1916, at Santa Isabel, Chihuahua, Mexico, as part of the Mexican Revolution. Mexican bandits led by Pablo Lopez, aligned with revolutionary Pancho Villa and operating in de facto government territory of Villa's rivals, the Constitutionalists—stopped a train in Santa Isabel and removed from it around 17 American citizens who were employees of the American Smelting and Refining Company. All but one of the Americans were summarily robbed, stripped, and executed. The massacre, ordered by Villa to demonstrate his control over northern Mexico to the Constitutionalists, led to ethnic violence in the area and calls for U.S. military intervention in Mexico. It thus partially led to the Pancho Villa Expedition, in which the U.S. Army went into northern Mexico to find Villa but were unsuccessful.

== Background ==
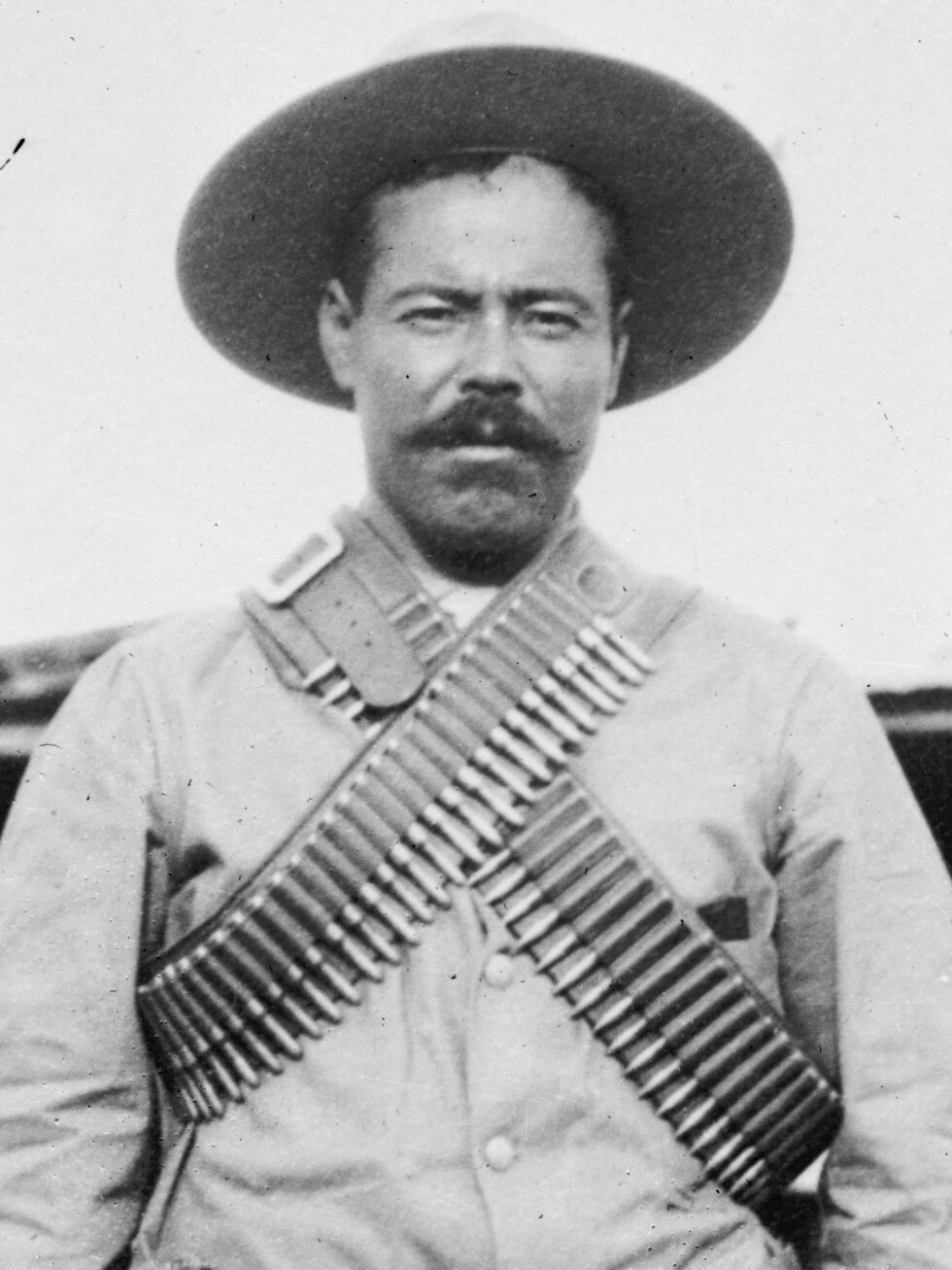
Pancho Villa in 1919

During the early years of the Mexican Revolution, from 1912 to 1914, the revolutionary Pancho Villa had aligned with Venustiano Carranza to form the Constitutionalists, an army that successfully rebelled against the "inefficient dictatorship" of Victoriano Huerta. Villa became the governor of the northern Mexican state of Chihuahua. In the latter half of 1914, however, Villa and Carranza became rivals, and soon fought multiple battles, the Constitutionalists on the side of Carranza and Villa with his own army of outlaws. Villa badly lost these battles, and fled with his army to the northern Mexican mountains, while Carranza controlled Chihuahua with his de facto government. Villa ordered the execution of the Americans in the Santa Isabel massacre "to demonstrate that Carranza did not control northern Mexico".

== Massacre ==
On January 10, 1916, around 17 American citizens employed by the American Smelting and Refining Company were on a train from Chihuahua City, to Cusihuiriachi, Chihuahua, where they were going to reopen properties belonging to the company. The company had been assured protection of the properties by the Constitutionalist local government. They were at Santa Isabel, Chihuahua (about 50 miles from Chihuahua City) when the train was stopped by Mexican bandits led by Pablo Lopez and aligned with Pancho Villa. The Americans were summarily robbed, stripped of their clothing, lined up, and shot. The only survivor was Thomas M. Holmes, who escaped in the darkness. The Associated Press reported soon after that 16 Americans were killed, while The New York Times reported that 17 were killed.

== Aftermath ==
The bodies were sent to Ciudad Juárez, Chihuahua. Thomas M. Holmes reported the incident in a message sent to his wife in El Paso, Texas. The Constitutionalist government and the American Smelting and Refining Company also confirmed the incident and gave details. It was covered by the Associated Press in El Paso on the 11th.

Soon, the leader of the perpetrators was discovered to be Pablo Lopez. On April 23, 1916, Lopez was discovered by Constitutionalists in a cave near Santa Isabel, and was taken with three of his followers to Chihuahua City for execution. He had been shot through both of his legs earlier, when Pancho Villa raided Columbus, New Mexico. Lopez then participated in Villa's raid of Guerrero, Chihuahua, and was hauled away from the battle by his men in a wagon. They ended up in the cave, by which point they had run out of provisions (including ammunition), and all but three of his men had abandoned him. The Constitutionalists found on Lopez's person a diary entry in which he states he was ordered by Villa to commit the massacre, as well as a book belonging to Tom Evans, one of the murdered victims. The Constitutionalists asked Lopez where Villa was located, and Lopez would not say other than that Villa was "over yonder" in the nearby mountains.

The massacre led to ethnic violence in the area and calls for U.S. military intervention in the region. Because of the massacre and the raid on Columbus, U.S. president Woodrow Wilson ordered a military expedition into northern Mexico led by General John J. Pershing. Known as the Pancho Villa Expedition, the goal was to find Villa, but it was ultimately unsuccessful.

== Victims ==
The ~16 American victims were, or included:

- Alexander Hall
- Charles A. Pringle
- Charles Wadleigh
- C. R. Watson
- E. L. Robinson
- George W. Newman
- Jack Hass
- J. P. Coy
- J. W. Woom
- Maurice Anderson
- M. B. Romero
- R. H. Cimmons
- R. T. McHatton
- Tom M. Evans
- W. D. Pierce
- William J. Wallace
