= Piedra Volada =

Waterfall in Mexico

Piedra Volada Falls (Spanish: Cascada de Piedra Volada) is a 453-meter-tall (1,490 ft) plunge waterfall that forms seasonally in the Barranca Candameña of the Sierra Madre Occidental range in Chihuahua, Mexico. Though it only flows during the rainy season, it is considered the tallest waterfall in Mexico and one of the tallest waterfalls in the world. The English translation of Piedra Volada is "Flying Rock" or "Flying Stone".

== Geography ==
The falls are located in Cañon Candameña, a canyon of the Copper Canyon (Barranca del Cobre) region, within the Ocampo Municipality of the State of Chihuahua. The head of the canyon is home to Cascada Basaseachi, the highest permanent waterfall in Mexico and its third-highest waterfall overall at 243 meters (797 ft). Piedra Volada is located on the left wall of the canyon approximately 7 km downstream of the head of the canyon.

Piedra Volada Falls flow only during the wet season. The falls may be viewed from a moderate distance from the brink of the canyon near Huahumar. A hiking trail to the pour-off is accessed through private land near Ejido San Lorenzo, currently an informal national park administered through the National Commission of Protected Natural Areas (CONANP) with an admission charge of $62MN.

== See also ==
- Plunge waterfalls
- Waterfalls of Mexico
- List of waterfalls
