= Basaseachic Falls National Park =

National park in Chihuahua, Mexico

- IUCN category II (national park)
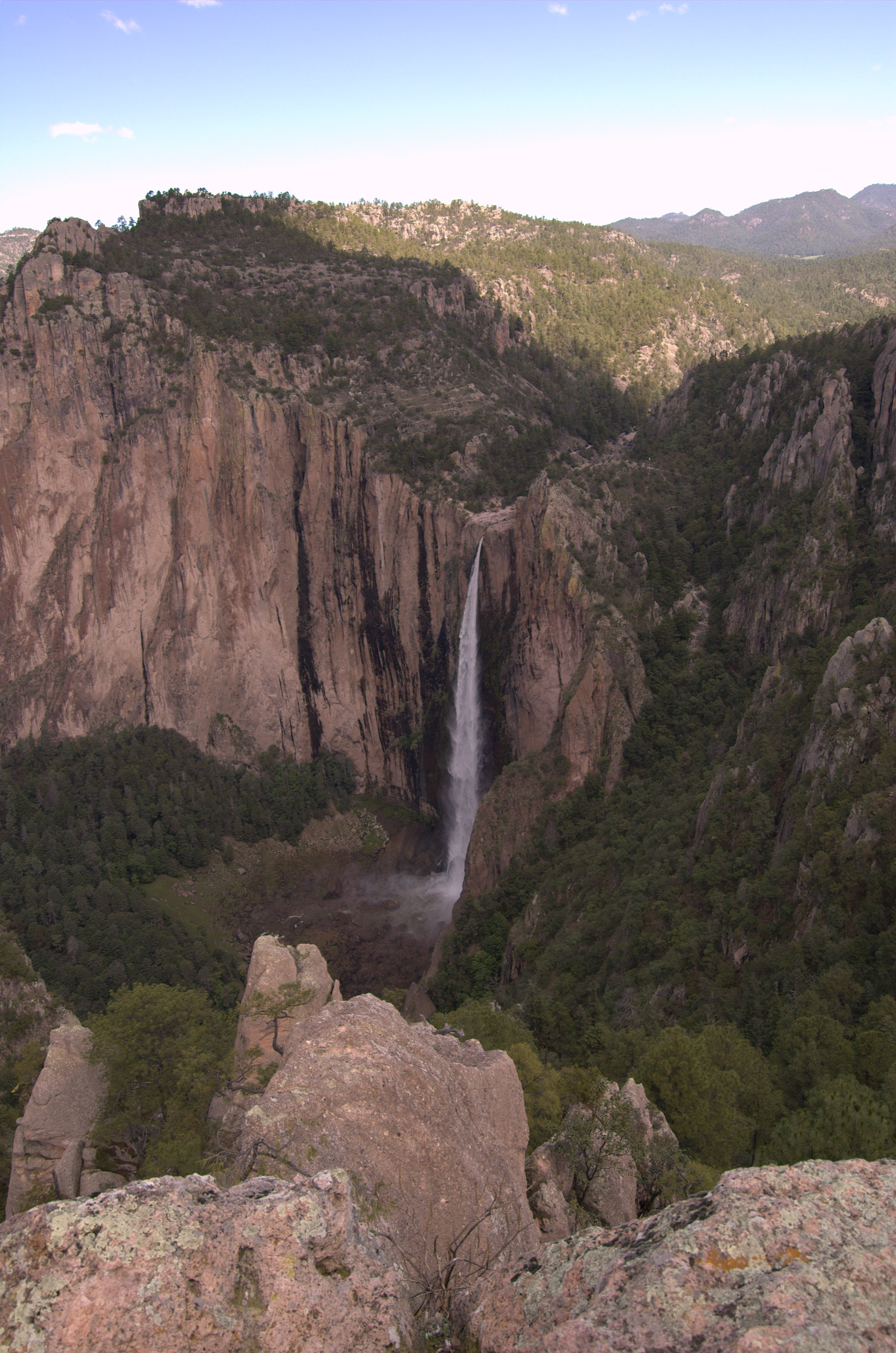

- Location within Mexico
- Interactive map of Basaseachic Falls National Park
- Location: Ocampo Municipality, Chihuahua, Mexico
- Nearest city: Ocampo, Chihuahua
- Coordinates: 28°07′59″N 108°15′00″W
- Area: 5,803 hectares (14,340 acres)
- Established: 2 February 1981
- Governing body: Secretariat of the Environment and Natural Resources

Basaseachic Falls National Park is a national park located in the western side of the state of Chihuahua in the heart of the Sierra Madre Occidental mountain range. The park is named after Basaseachic Falls (Cascada de Basaseachic) the second tallest waterfall in Mexico with a height of 246 meters (853 ft). Basaseachic Falls empties into Candameña Canyon (Barranca de Candameña) which was carved by the Basaseachic River over millions of years. The park is known for its pine–oak forest, rock formations, and scenic views from high cliffs. Cliffs in the park reach an impressive height of 1,640 meters (5,380 ft).

== History ==
Basaseachic Falls were discovered by Europeans sometime in the 18th century, becoming one of the most popular tourist attraction of the state of Chihuahua. The area of the present-day national park was inhabited by Tarahumara prior to the Spanish Colonial period. The etymology of the name "Basaseachic" originates from the Tarahumara language, Rarámuri meaning "place of the wolves", "basachí" being the word used to call the coyotes.

The first known European settlement in the area was Misión de Tomochi near the town of Cajurichi which was under the legal jurisdiction of the mission. After the 18th century, the area attracted many settlers because of the discovery of abundant natural resources like minerals and high-quality wood.

Basaseachic Falls National Park was created by the Mexican federal government on 2 February 1981, by decree under president Jose Lopez Portillo. The park was defined to 5,803 hectares (14,340 acres) in the Sierra Madre Occidental along the surrounding area of the Basaseachic Falls and Barranca de Candameña.

== Geography ==
The park is located in the subdivision of the Sierra Madre Occidental known as Sierra Tarahumara, near the municipality of Ocampo, Chihuahua. The dramatic topology was created by deep tectonic plate movements causing large fractures and rising rifts. The violent movement of the terrain resulted in deep canyons and high mountains. The present-day topology has been changed over thousands of years by wind erosion and the Basaseachic River.

The vertically pronounced walls of the Candameña Canyon can reach a height of 1,640 meters (5,380 ft); Candameña Canyon is known as one of the deepest canyons in the Sierra Tarahumara. The park includes two rivers: Duraznos River and Basaseachic River; both rivers feed into Basaseachic Falls that empties into the Candameña Canyon finally ending in the Candameña River.

== Climate ==
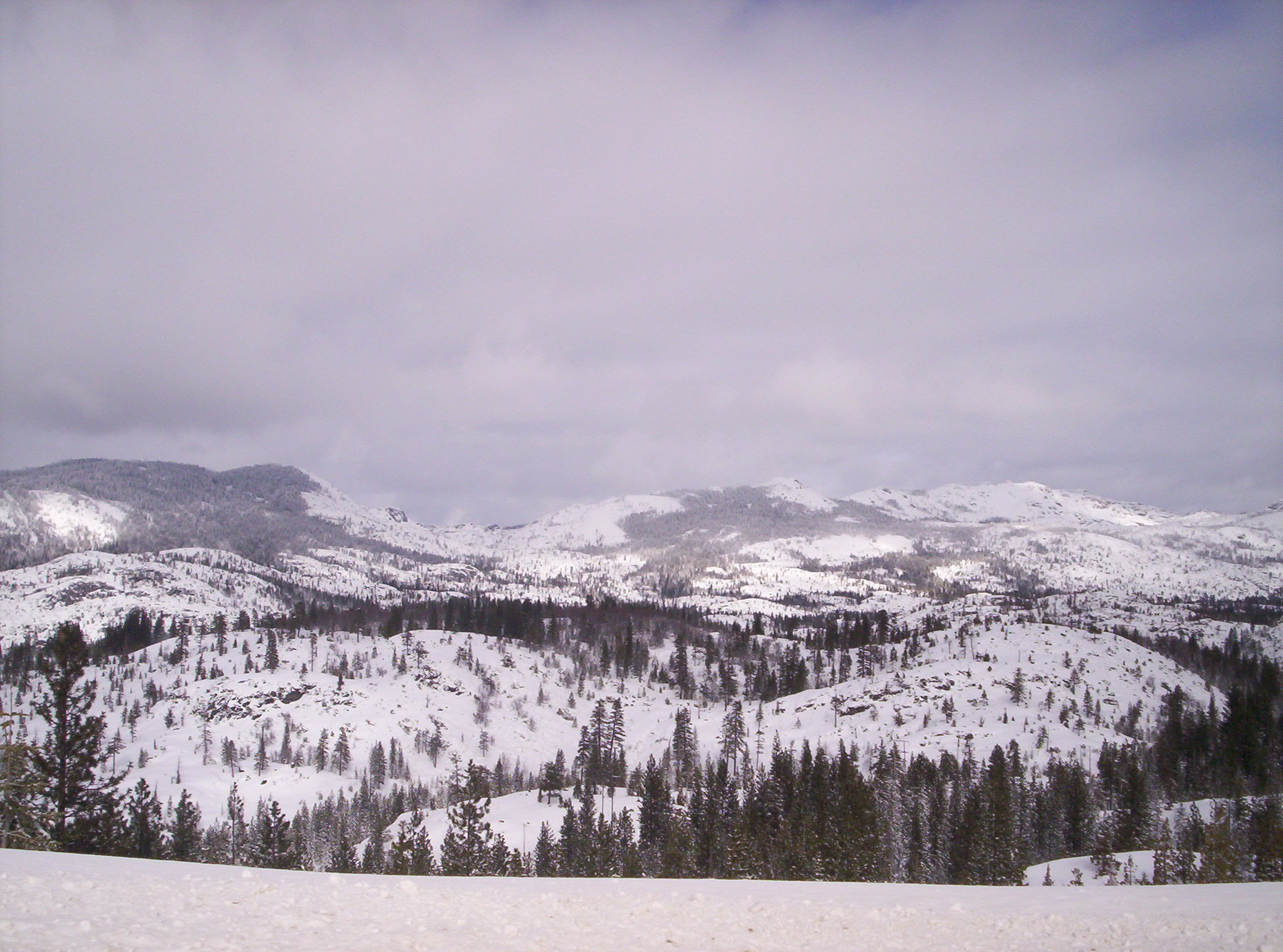
Winter snowfall in the Sierra Madre Occidental

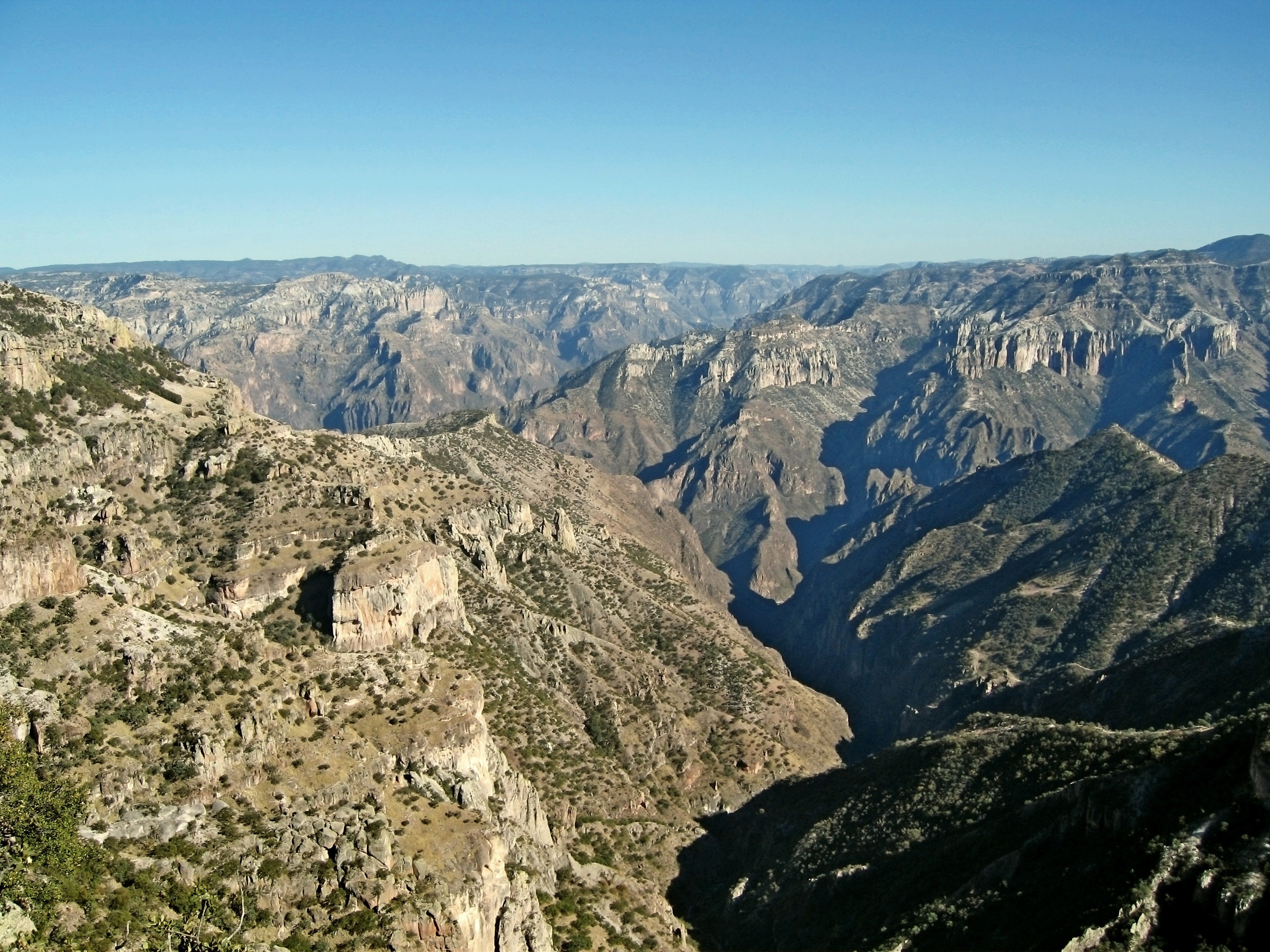
Copper Canyon

The climate in the park changes depending on the elevation of the terrain. There are many microclimates in the park due to the different terrain.

== Flora and fauna ==
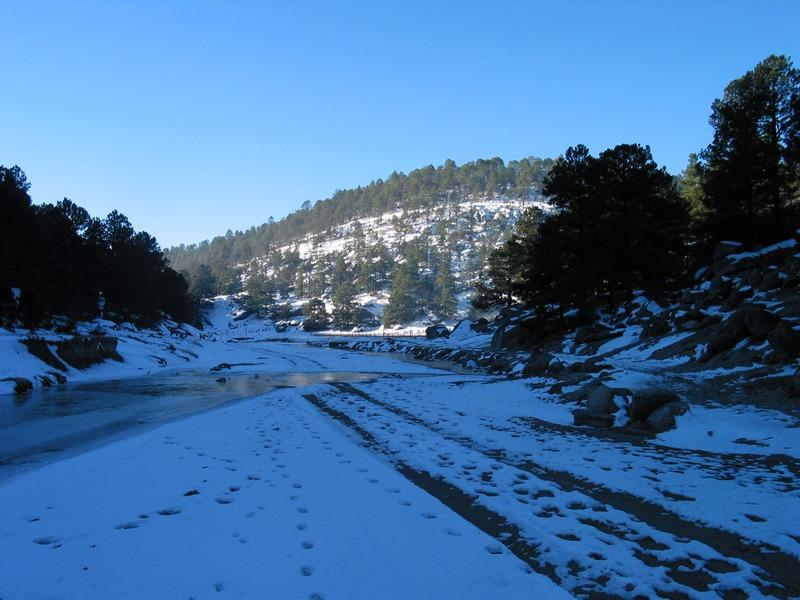
Chihuahua White Pine in the Sierra Madre Occidental during the winter.

The park has a great diversity in flora found in Northern Mexico. One of the factors that allows the park to have such a great variety of flora is due to the large number of microclimates found in the park due to dramatic terrain. The flora in the park like that found throughout the Sierra Madre Occidental mountain range varies with elevation. Pine (Pinus) and oak (Quercus) species are usually found at an elevation of 2,000 meters (6,560 ft) above sea level. The park contains 92 species of conifers and 76 species of oaks. A large number of flora species in the following genus are observed in the park: Pinus, Quercus, Ficus, Vachellia, Ipomoea, Acacia, Lysiloma, Bursera, Vitex, Tabebuia, Sideroxylon, Cordia, Fouquieria, Pithecellobium.

The park also supports a large variety of fauna including a significant number of mammals, reptiles and birds. The mammals that can be found in the park include: Mexican fox squirrel (Sciurus nayaritensis), antelope jackrabbit (Lepus alleni), raccoon (Procyon lotor), hooded skunk (Mephitis macroura), wild boar (Sus scrofa), collared peccary (Pecari tajacu), white-tailed deer (Odocoileus virginianus), cougar (Puma concolor). The three main species of reptiles found in the park are: Texas horned lizard (Phrynosoma cornutum), rock rattlesnake (Crotalus lepidus), black-tail rattlesnake (Crotalus molossus).

There is a great variety of birds observed in the park including: Mexican jay (Aphelocoma ultramarina), Steller's jay (Cyanocitta stelleri), acorn woodpecker (Melanerpes formicivorus), canyon towhee (Pipilo fuscus), mourning dove (Zenaida macroura), broad-billed hummingbird (Cynanthus latirostris), Montezuma quail (Cyrtonyx montezumae), mountain trogon (Trogon mexicanus), turkey Vulture (Cathartes aura). Trogon mexicanus is endemic species found in the mountains in Mexico; it is considered an endangered species and has symbolic significance to Mexicans.

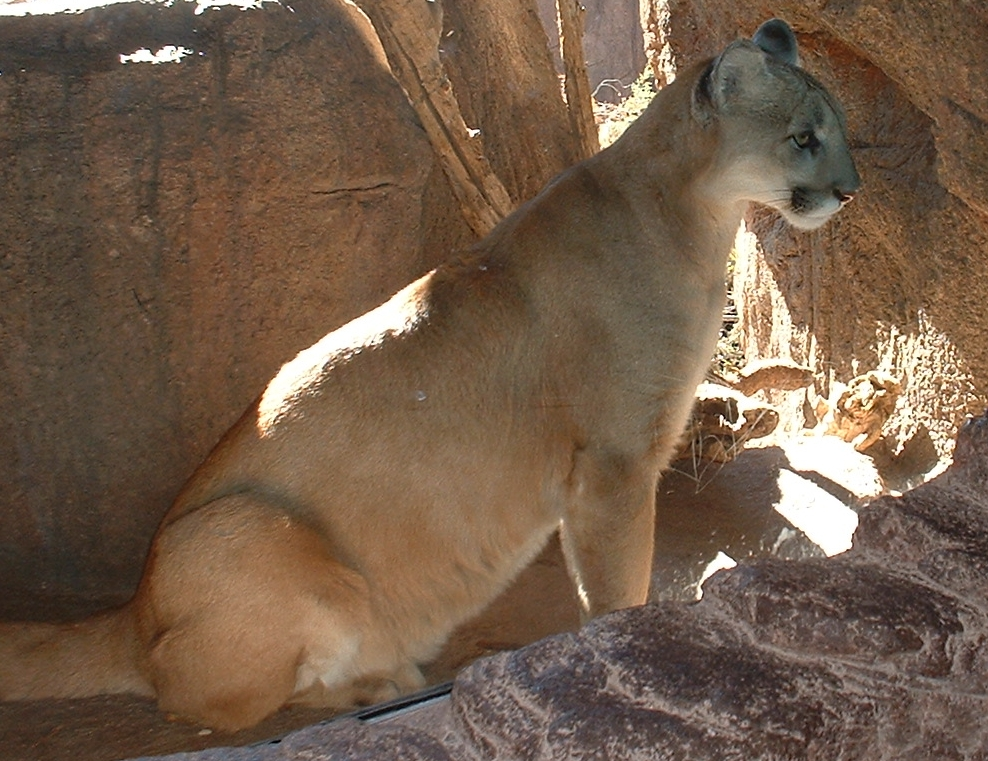
Mountain Lion (Puma concolor)

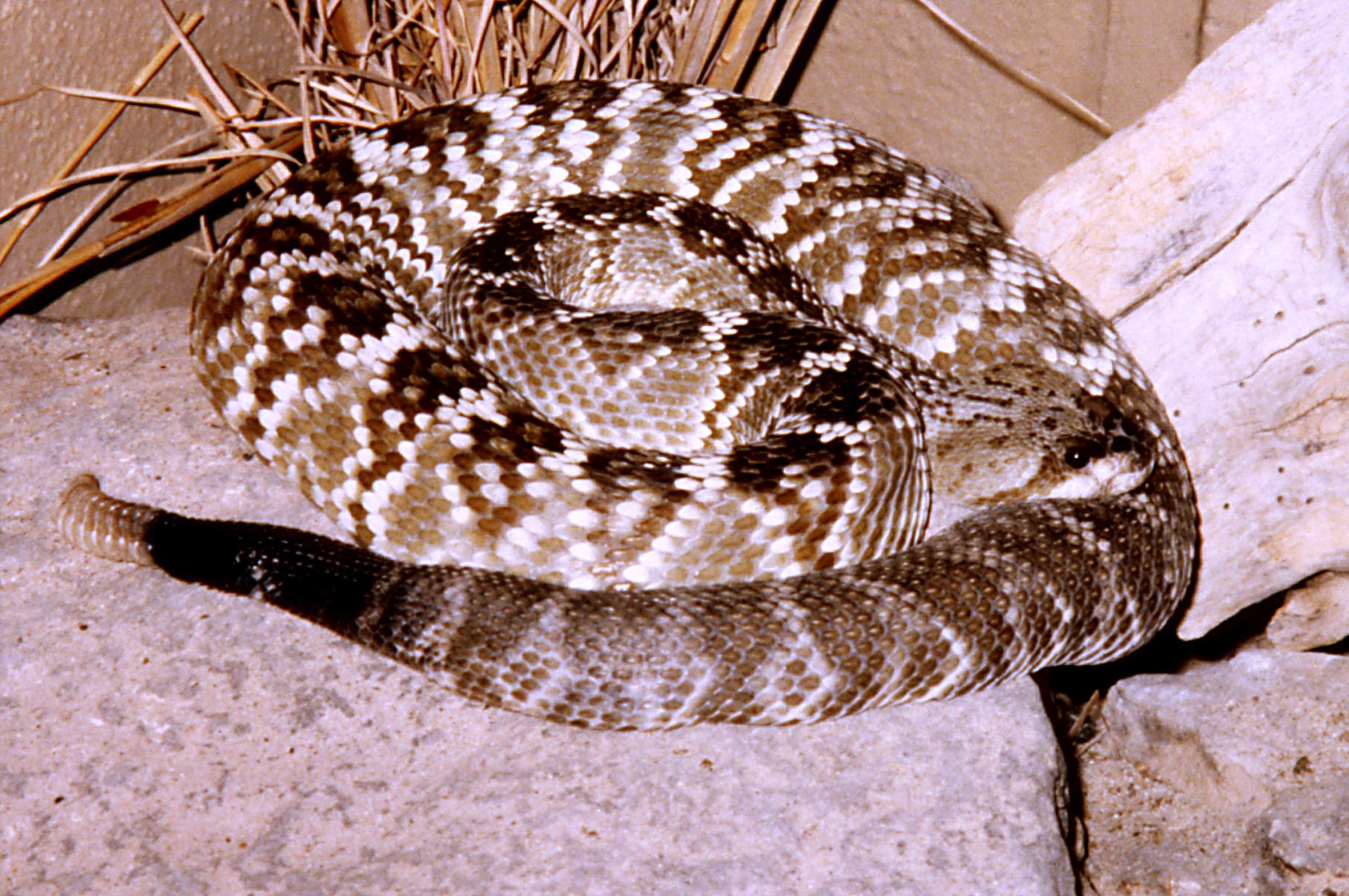
Black-tail rattlesnake (Crotalus molossus)

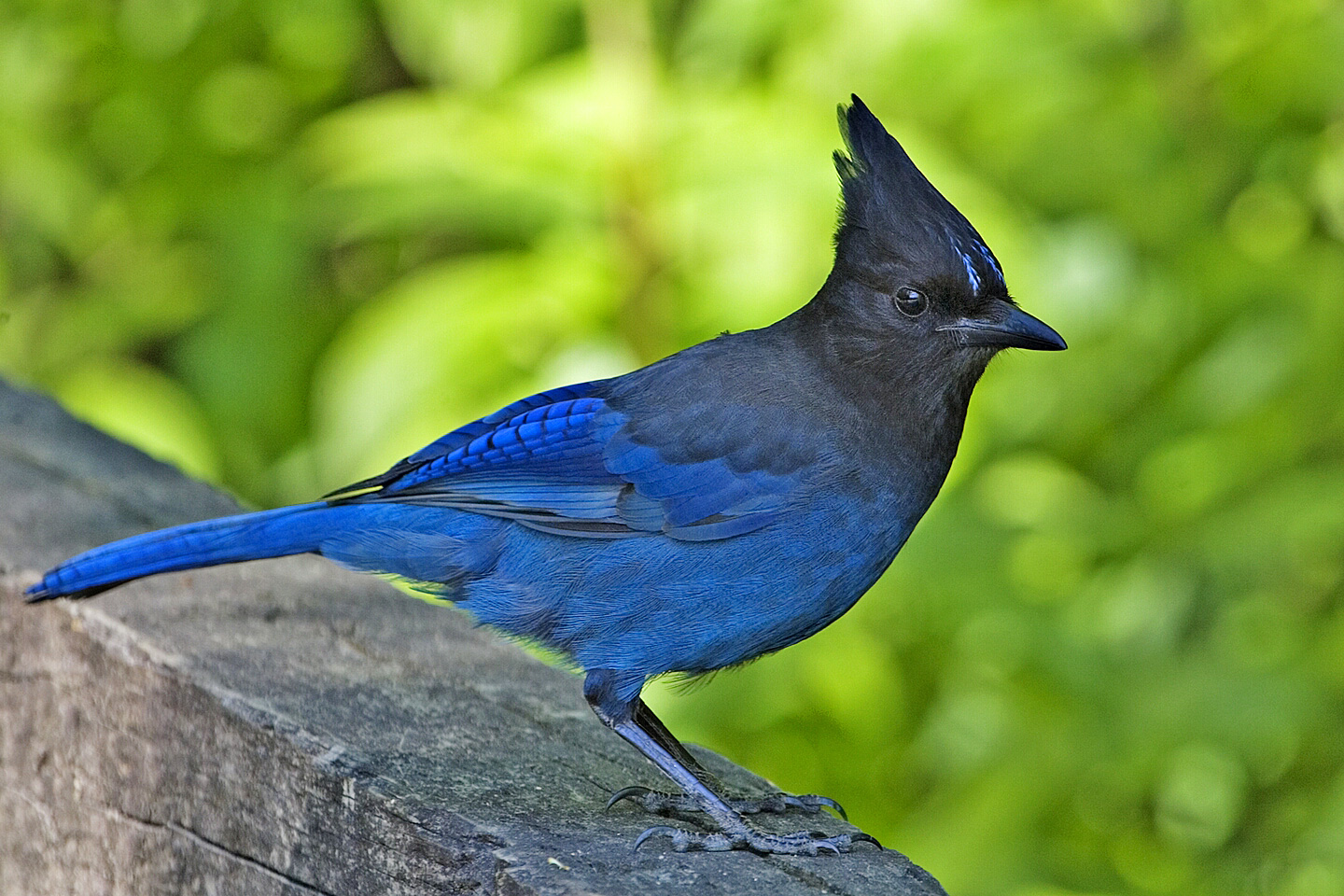
Steller's jay (Cyanocitta stelleri)

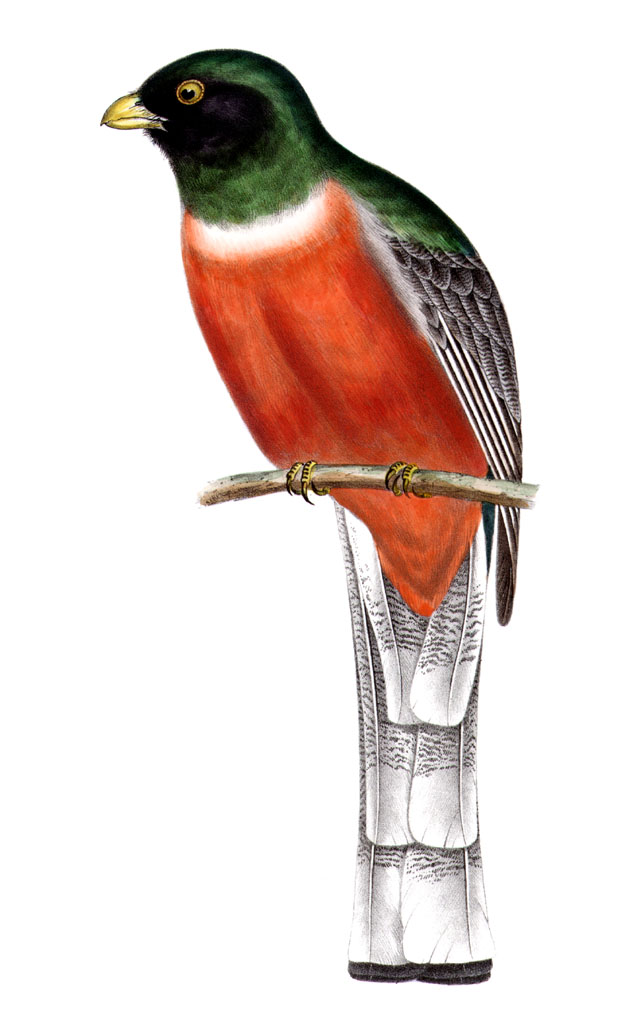
Trogon mexicanus is known as the Mexican flag bird because it resembles the colors on the Mexican flag.
