= Basaseachic Falls =

Second-highest waterfall in Mexico

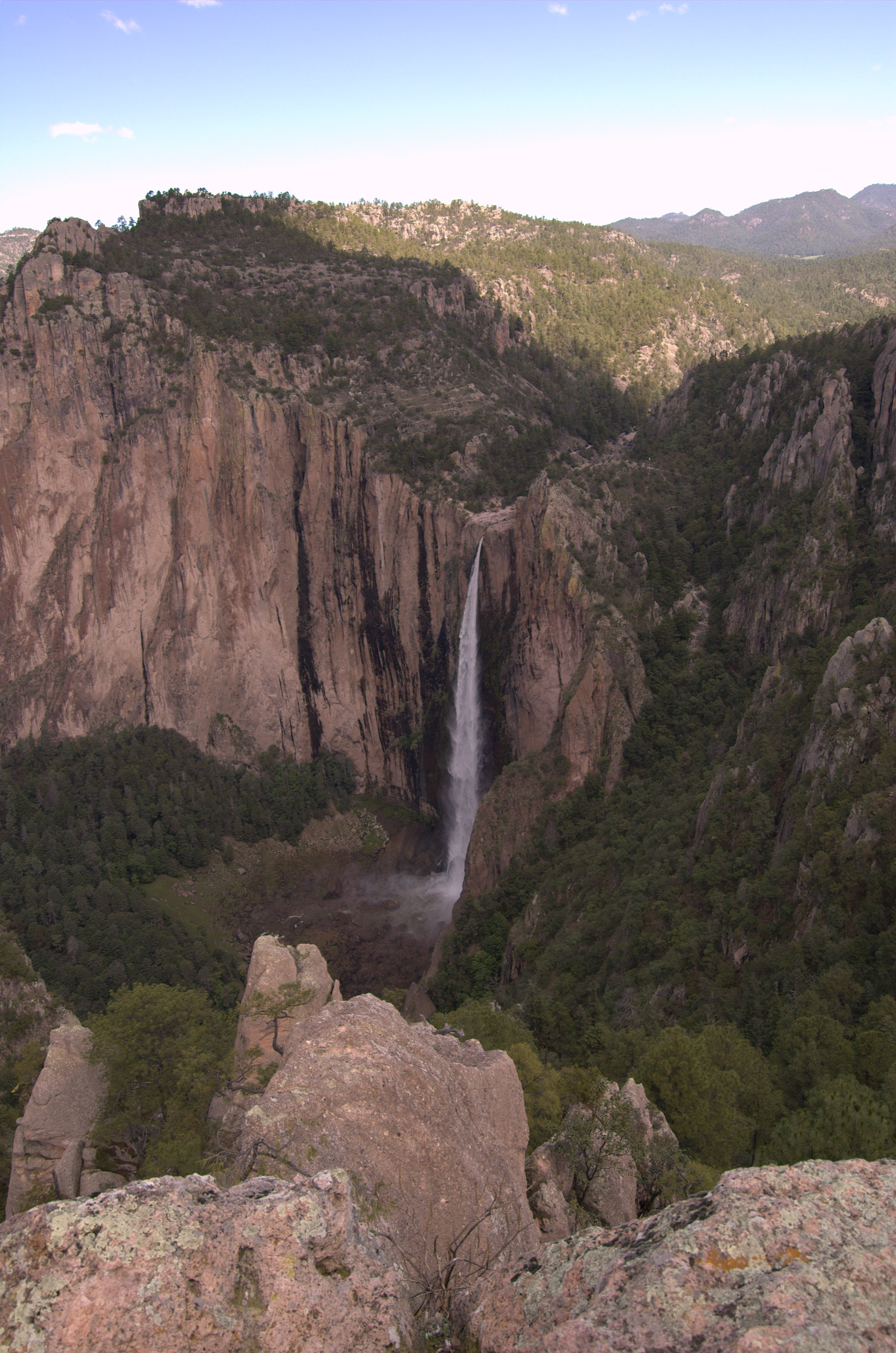
- Basaseachic Falls during the Spring
- Interactive map of Basaseachic Falls
- Location: Ocampo Municipality, near Creel, Chihuahua
- Coordinates: 28°10′27″N 108°12′45″W
- Type: Plunge
- Total height: 807 ft (246 m)
- Number of drops: 1
- Watercourse: Río Candameña
- World height ranking: 226

Basaseachic Falls (Spanish: Cascada de Basaseachi) on the Basaseachic River is the second-highest waterfall in Mexico, located in the Parque Nacional Basaseachic (Basaseachic Falls National Park) at Cañón Basaseachic in the Copper Canyon region of northwest Mexico, near Creel, Chihuahua. It is 246 meters (807 ft) tall, second in Mexico only to the Cascada de Piedra Volada (Flying Stone Falls).

Basaseachic Falls is located in the high mountains of the Sierra Madre Occidental, in the Municipality of Ocampo, 3 km (1.9 mi) from Basaseachi community and about 265 km (165 mi) west of Chihuahua. It is reached via Federal Highway 16 and its surroundings make up the Basaseachic Falls National Park (Parque Nacional Cascada de Basaseachic).

The waterfall is made by two streams, Arroyo del Durazno and Arroyo de Basaseachic, which merge in the high mountains and then fall down the canyon wall. Past the falls, the stream is called Río Candameña (Candameña River), which is the namesake of the canyon it flows through, Candameña Canyon (Cañón Candameña). The Candameña River is a tributary of the Río Mayo (Mayo River).

Basaseachic Falls was considered the tallest waterfall in México until the measurement in September, 1994 of the Cascada de Piedra Volada. Both of these waterfalls are seasonal, drying up in the Spring and Autumn dry seasons.

== See also ==
- List of waterfalls
