= Guadalupe Pérez Domínguez =

Mexican politician

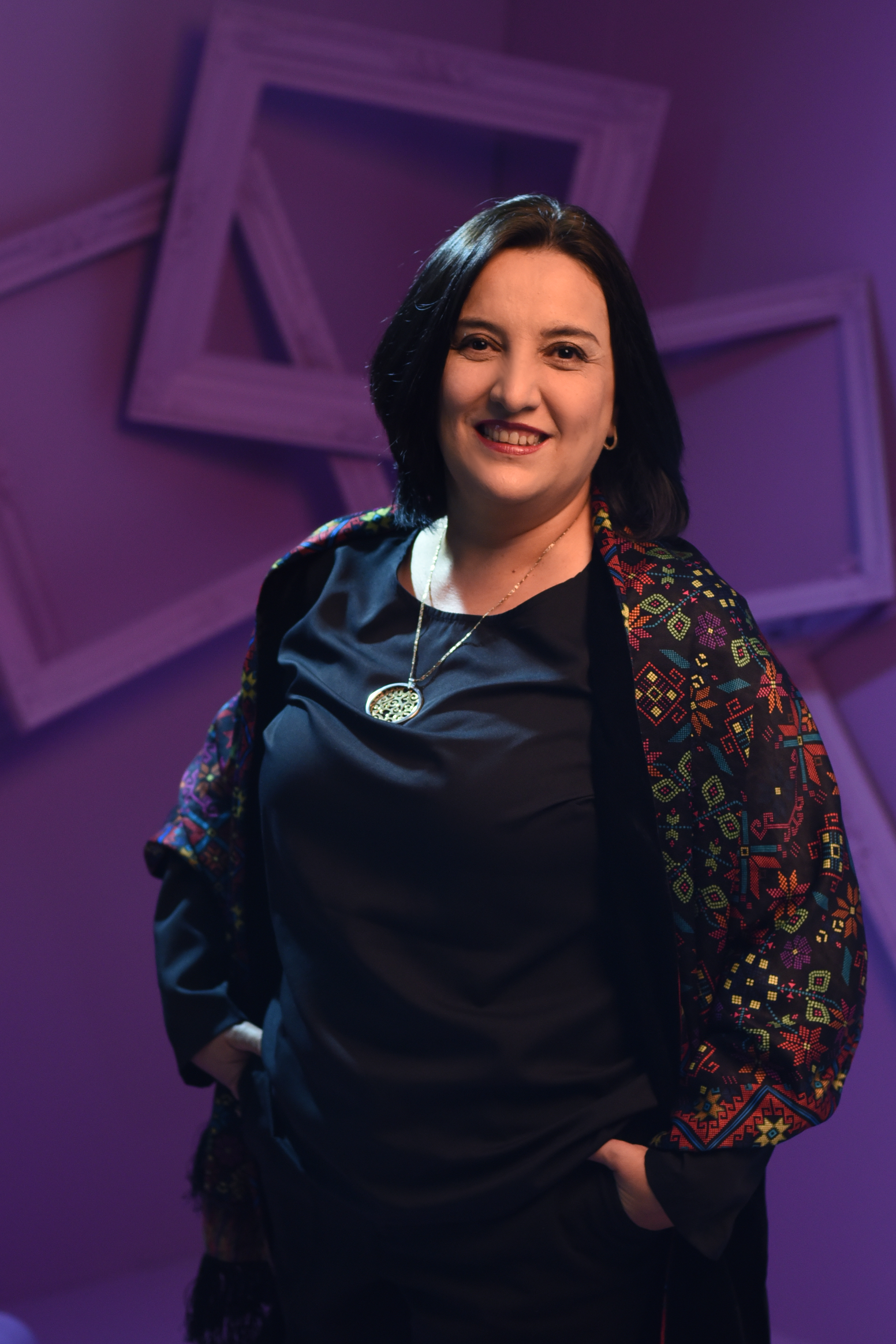
- Born: 25 June 1972 (age 53); Cuauhtémoc, Chihuahua, Mexico
- Occupation: Politician
- Political party: PRI

Guadalupe Pérez Domínguez (born 25 June 1972) is a Mexican politician from the Institutional Revolutionary Party (PRI). In the 2009 mid-terms she was elected to the Chamber of Deputies to represent the seventh district of Chihuahua during the 61st session of Congress.
