= Athie =

Athie may refer to:

- Athie (surname), a surname
- Athie, Côte-d'Or, a commune in the department of Côte-d'Or
- Athie, Yonne, a commune in the department of Yonne

== See also ==
- Athies (disambiguation)
