= San Andrés, Chihuahua =

Town in the Mexican state of Chihuahua

San Andrés
- Town
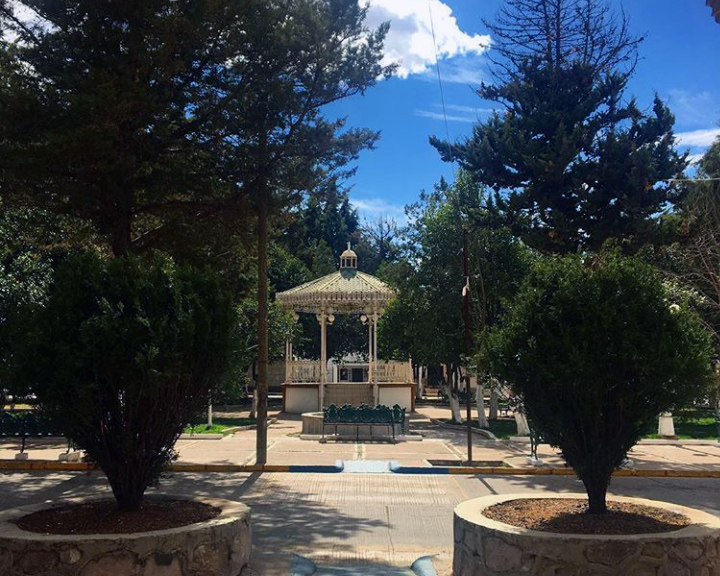

- Location in Mexico
- Coordinates: 28°32′45″N 106°30′06″W
- Country: Mexico
- State: Chihuahua
- Municipality: Riva Palacio

Population (2010)
  - Total: 662

San Andrés is a small town in the Mexican state of Chihuahua. It serves as the municipal seat for the surrounding Riva Palacio Municipality.

As of 2010, the town had a population of 662, down from 667 as of 2005.

== History ==
San Andrés, Chihuahua was founded in 1696. This area was ruled by San Francisco de Asís at the end of the 17th century, but afterwards it came under the control of General Trias' political power. The municipality of San Andrés is established on October 18, 1887. In honor of General Vicente Riva Palacio, it was granted the name Riva Palacio by order in December 1932. On January 22, 1992, the municipality of Riva Palacio's capital once again adopted the name San Andrés.

== Demographics ==
There were 702 people living in San Andrés in 2020. 360 women and 342 men, respectively, made up the gender split. The population has increased steadily over the years; we can notice a rise from 667 people in 2005 to 702 people in 2020.
