= Athie (surname) =

Athie is a surname. Notable people with the surname include:

- Antonio Díaz Athié (born 1958), Mexican politician
- Carlos Athié (born 1987), Mexican actor, model, and TV presenter
- Kamel Athie Flores (born 1950), Mexican politician
- Mamoudou Athie (born 1988), Mauritanian-American actor
