= Bocoyna =

Town in the Mexican state of Chihuahua

- Town
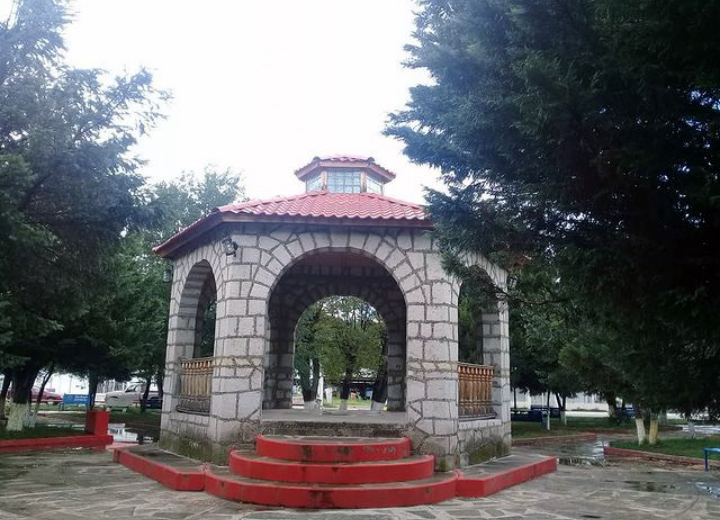
- Center in Bocoyna, Chihuahua

- Location in Mexico
- Coordinates: 27°50′25″N 107°35′21″W
- Country: Mexico
- State: Chihuahua
- Municipality: Bocoyna

Population (2010)
  - Total: 796

Bocoyna is a town and seat of the municipality of Bocoyna, in Chihuahua state of northern Mexico. As of 2010, the town of Bocoyna had a population of 796, up from 735 as of 2005.

Bocoyna is located on the route of the Ferrocarril Chihuahua al Pacífico Railroad
