= Jorge Doroteo Zapata =

Mexican lawyer and politician

- Born: 26 September 1949 (age 76); Chihuahua, Chihuahua, Mexico
- Occupations: Lawyer and politician
- Political party: PRI

Jorge Doroteo Zapata García (born 26 September 1949) is a Mexican lawyer and politician affiliated with the Institutional Revolutionary Party (PRI).

In 2000–2006 he served in the Senate during the 58th and 59th sessions of Congress, representing Chihuahua. He had previously served in the Chamber of Deputies in 1985–1988 for Chihuahua's seventh district and in 1997–2000 as a plurinominal deputy for the second region.
