= Creel, Chihuahua =

Creel
- City
- Creel
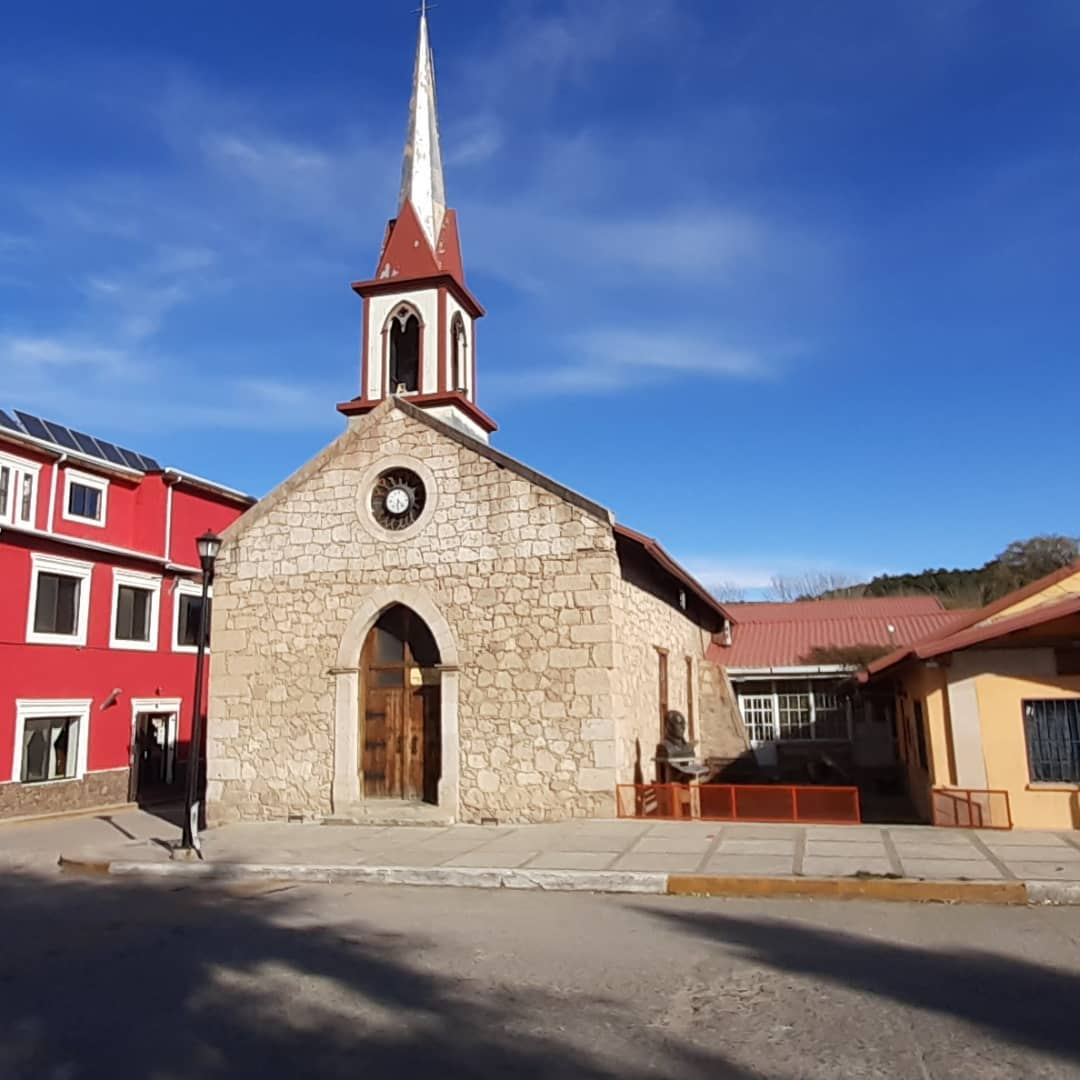
- Cristo Rey Temple in Creel.

- Location of Creel in Mexico
- Coordinates: 27°45′08″N 107°38′05″W
- Country: Mexico
- State: Chihuahua
- Municipality: Bocoyna
- Founded: May 26, 1907
- Elevation: 2,350 m (7,710 ft)

Population (2010)
  - Total: 5,026
- Time zone: UTC-6 (CST)
- Postal code: 33200
- Area code: 635

Creel (Spanish pronunciation: [ˈkɾil]) is a town in the Sierra Tarahumara (part of the Sierra Madre Occidental) of the Mexican state of Chihuahua. It is the second-largest town (after San Juanito) in the municipality of Bocoyna. It is located some 175 kilometres (109 mi) to the southwest of the state capital, Chihuahua City. At the census of 2010, it had a population of 5,026, down from 5,338 as of 2005. It is notable for being inhabited mostly by Native Americans of the Rarámuri ethnic group, and the use of their native language is widespread in the population in daily life and public events such as church masses.

Creel was historically a logging town, although tourism has become the primary job source over the last 20 years because it is close to the Copper Canyon as well as Basaseachic Falls, one of the highest waterfalls in Mexico. There are many hotels, restaurants and a number of tours down into the canyons and throughout the surrounding area.

== History ==
Creel was founded with the name 'Estación Creel' on May 26, 1907, as a railroad depot on the Chihuahua–Pacific line. It was named after Enrique Creel, governor of Chihuahua state at the time. He was the son of Reuben W. Creel, American delegate in Chihuahua. Creel was founded as a planned agricultural settlement that was intended to have a small number of Mexicans who were supposed to spread their culture onto the Rarámuri, who were supposed to be the majority of the population. It was supposed to have 25 Mexican and 75 Rarámuri families, but in its early years had only about 30 Rarámuri families although the right number of Mexicans.

For many years before its completion the Ferrocarril Chihuahua al Pacífico line ended at Creel.

== Climate ==
Creel's high altitude gives it a cool subtropical highland climate (Köppen climate classification Cwb), characterised by mild days and cold nights with frost occurring most mornings from October to April, though daytime temperatures in those months remain comfortable. Precipitation during the winter is not infrequent, but snowfalls are not particularly common, occurring on average only four days per year (more frequently on the nearby mountain peaks).

Climate data for Creel (1951–2010)
Month	Jan	Feb	Mar	Apr	May	Jun	Jul	Aug	Sep	Oct	Nov	Dec	Year
Record high °C (°F)	25.0 (77.0)	27.0 (80.6)	27.0 (80.6)	31.0 (87.8)	37.0 (98.6)	37.0 (98.6)	38.0 (100.4)	32.0 (89.6)	34.0 (93.2)	30.0 (86.0)	29.0 (84.2)	29.0 (84.2)	38.0 (100.4)
Mean daily maximum °C (°F)	13.4 (56.1)	15.4 (59.7)	17.7 (63.9)	21.1 (70.0)	24.3 (75.7)	27.1 (80.8)	25.0 (77.0)	24.2 (75.6)	23.2 (73.8)	21.0 (69.8)	18.1 (64.6)	14.7 (58.5)	20.4 (68.7)
Daily mean °C (°F)	4.1 (39.4)	5.5 (41.9)	7.3 (45.1)	10.2 (50.4)	13.5 (56.3)	17.2 (63.0)	17.6 (63.7)	17.1 (62.8)	15.6 (60.1)	11.8 (53.2)	8.0 (46.4)	5.2 (41.4)	11.1 (52.0)
Mean daily minimum °C (°F)	−5.2 (22.6)	−4.5 (23.9)	−3.2 (26.2)	−0.6 (30.9)	2.6 (36.7)	7.4 (45.3)	10.3 (50.5)	10.0 (50.0)	7.9 (46.2)	2.7 (36.9)	−2.2 (28.0)	−4.1 (24.6)	1.8 (35.2)
Record low °C (°F)	−21.3 (−6.3)	−21.0 (−5.8)	−23.0 (−9.4)	−11.0 (12.2)	−9.5 (14.9)	−12.0 (10.4)	1.0 (33.8)	1.6 (34.9)	−3.0 (26.6)	−8.5 (16.7)	−13.0 (8.6)	−22.5 (−8.5)	−23.0 (−9.4)
Average precipitation mm (inches)	48.9 (1.93)	32.5 (1.28)	21.7 (0.85)	17.1 (0.67)	16.3 (0.64)	64.0 (2.52)	154.5 (6.08)	137.8 (5.43)	88.8 (3.50)	46.6 (1.83)	26.5 (1.04)	49.3 (1.94)	704.0 (27.72)
Average precipitation days (≥ 0.1 mm)	5.3	3.6	2.9	2.4	2.5	8.5	18.5	16.9	11.0	5.0	3.2	4.7	84.5
Average snowy days	1.38	0.61	0.72	0.08	0	0	0	0	0	0	0.42	0.70	3.91
Source 1: Servicio Meteorológico National
Source 2: Colegio de Postgraduados

== Transport ==
The Chihuahua al Pacífico (Chepe) railroad runs from the city of Chihuahua to Los Mochis with four passenger trains arriving daily - two from each direction. There is also bus service to Chihuahua, as well as regular service down to the small town of Batopilas, a trip that takes about five hours each way.

== Gallery ==
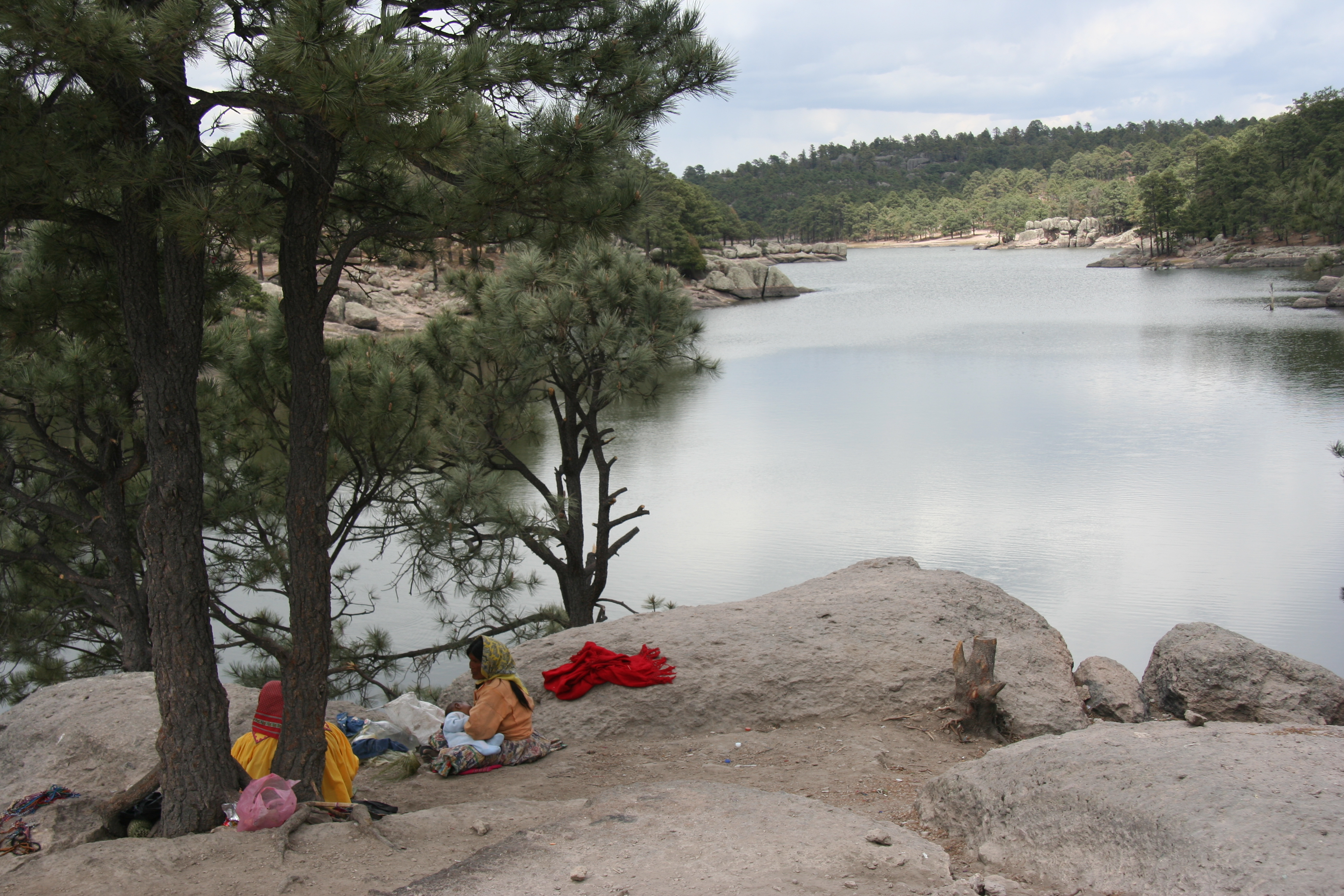
Lake Arareco.

== See also ==
- Chihuahua
- Copper Canyon
