= Athies =

Athies may refer to:

- Athies, Pas-de-Calais, a commune of France
- Athies, Somme, a commune of France
- Athies-sous-Laon, a commune of Germany

== See also ==
- Athie (disambiguation)
