= Grupo La Norteñita =

Grupo La Norteñita is a Mexican corporation headquartered in Ciudad Cuauhtémoc, Chihuahua, Mexico that produces apples. It mainly grows, transforms and sells apples and other agricultural products. It is known for its packaging of selected apples in plastic trays. La Norteñita also produces apple juice and other apple derivatives such as jelly and jam. This company also ranches cattle; however, it is better known for its agriculture production.

== History ==
The company started in the 1950s, when Salvador Corral Piñón and his wife, Luz Camila Pérez Domínguez, formally established the business that over the years would be consolidated as Group Norteñita. With a consolidated activity in trade of seeds and fodder and good access to cattle feed, the company began farming and raising livestock from the acquisition of Rancho Santa Elena in 1962.

In 1968, encouraged by close friends, Corral planted the company's first apple trees, which evolved into production of some 2,300,000 trees covering about 30,000 hectares (74,000 acres) of orchards and produces about 60% of the Mexican apple crop. In 1980, the company was consolidated under the brand "La Norteñita". The company opened a cooling and packing plant in 1983, that allowed it to expand its market coverage and to ensure product quality. Its storage capacity is one of the largest facilities of its kind in the world.

== Chihuahua ==
Apple output in Chihuahua is about 16 million boxes, of which 25–30% are processed depending on frost and hail damage. The region is described as dry and sandy with rainfall of 8-15 inches. Deep wells for irrigation saved the region during 14 years of drought. Most rainfall is in July and August. Frost is a major risk, but under-tree irrigation with warm water from the wells has helped mitigate frost risk.

== Current Production ==
La Norteñita has 2,000 ha of apples and annually plants new fields at the rate of 250,000 trees. It employs 5,000 people at peak harvest and packs 2 million boxes of apples. Production is 50 bins/acre (50 tons/ha), 30% of production is Red Delicious and 70% is Golden Delicious. 40% of the area is not in production, including Gala plantings. Built in 2006, the headquarters is located at km 98.5 of the Chihuahua – Cuauhtémoc Highway.
