= Kamel Athie Flores =

Mexican politician (born 1950)

- Born: 28 February 1950 (age 76); Cuauhtémoc, Chihuahua, Mexico
- Occupation: Deputy
- Political party: PRI

Kamel Athie Flores (born 28 February 1950) is a Mexican politician affiliated with the Institutional Revolutionary Party (PRI). In the 2012 general election he was elected to the Chamber of Deputies to represent the seventh district of Chihuahua during the 62nd Congress.
