= Riva Palacio Municipality =

Municipality in the Mexican state of Chihuahua

Riva Palacio
- Municipality
- Municipality of Riva Palacio in Chihuahua
- Coordinates: 28°32′45″N 106°30′06″W
- Country: Mexico
- State: Chihuahua
- Founded: 1894
- Named for: Vicente Riva Palacio
- Seat: San Andrés
- Largest city: San Andrés

Area
  - Total: 808.97 km^{2} (312.35 sq mi)

Population (2005)
  - Total: 8,012
  - Density: 9.904/km^{2} (25.65/sq mi)

Riva Palacio is one of the 67 municipalities of Chihuahua, in northern Mexico. The municipal seat lies at San Andrés. Riva Palacio has an area of 808.97 km^{2}.

As of 2010, it had a population of 8,012, up from 7,811 as of 2005.

The municipality had 155 localities, none of which had a population over 1,000.

The municipality's name is in honour of Vicente Riva Palacio.

== Geography ==
=== Towns and villages ===
Riva Palacio has 98 localities. The largest are:

Name	Population (2005)
San Andrés	667
Campo Sesenta y Tres	286
Sainapuchi	263
Total Municipality	7,811
