= Namiquipa =

Town in the Mexican state of Chihuahua

Namiquipa, Chihuahua
- Municipal Seat
- Municipality of Namiquipa in Chihuahua

- Location in Mexico
- Coordinates: 29°15′01″N 107°24′33″W
- Country: Mexico
- State: Chihuahua
- Municipality: Namiquipa
- Franciscan Mission: 1763
- Town status: 1778

Government
  - Municipal President: Héctor Ariel Meixueiro Muñoz (PRI)
- Elevation: 1,888 m (6,194 ft)

Population (2010)
  - Total: 1,752
- Postal code: 31960
- Area code: 659
- Demonym: Namiquipense

Namiquipa is a town in the Mexican state of Chihuahua. It serves as the municipal seat for the surrounding municipality of Namiquipa.

As of 2010, the town of Namiquipa had a population of 1,752, up from 1,718 as of 2005.

== History ==
The origin of the settlement is an indigenous village called Namiquipa.

Franciscan missionaries established a mission in 1662 or 1663 called San Pedro de Alcántara de Namiquipa. It was subsequently abandoned.

Namiquipa was refounded and given town (villa) status in 1778. The Spanish colonial state established the town and surrounding region as a military colony, and its settlers received land grants in return for fighting Apache during the Apache Wars.

Namiquipa was a stronghold of Pancho Villa’s popular movement during much of the Mexican Revolution of 1910–1920. However, in 1916 locals switched sides and formed local militia that collaborated with the United States. In 1917 Namiquipa was attacked by Villa and his men, who reportedly raped many townswomen after setting the town ablaze. Villa's commander Nicolas Fernandez managed to take some of the townswomen under his protection, and ordered his soldiers to shoot any one who tried to attack them. After news of the atrocity spread, Villa lost the goodwill of many villagers across Chihuahua.
