= Namiquipa Municipality =

Municipality in the Mexican state of Chihuahua

Namiquipa
- Municipality
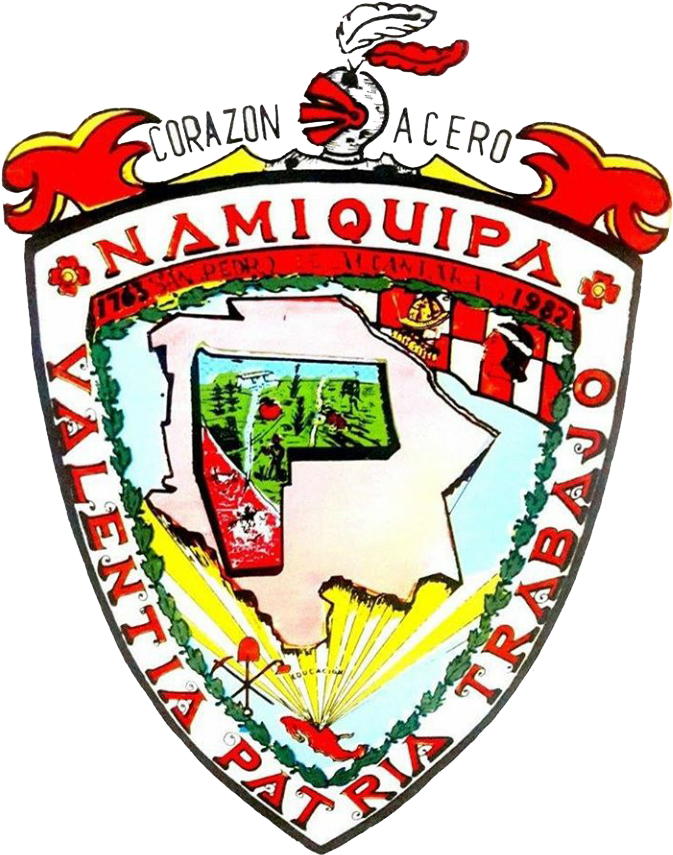
- Coat of arms

- Municipality of Namiquipa in Chihuahua

- Location in Mexico
- Coordinates: 29°15′01″N 107°24′33″W
- Country: Mexico
- State: Chihuahua
- Municipal seat: Namiquipa
- Municipality created: 21 November 1844

Government
  - Municipal President: Héctor Ariel Meixueiro Muñoz (PRI)

Area
  - Total: 4,212.58 km^{2} (1,626.49 sq mi)
- Elevation: 1,888 m (6,194 ft)

Population (2010)
  - Total: 22,880
  - Density: 5.431/km^{2} (14.07/sq mi)
- Demonym: Namiquipense
- Website: www.namiquipa.gob.mx

Namiquipa is one of the 67 municipalities of Chihuahua, in northern Mexico. The municipal seat lies at Namiquipa.

As of 2010, the municipality had a total population of 22,880, up from 20,314 as of 2005.

As of 2010, the town of Namiquipa had a population of 1,752, up from 1,718 as of 2005. Other than the town of Namiquipa, the municipality had 363 localities, the largest of which (with 2010 populations in parentheses) were: Santa Ana (2,978), classified as urban, and El Terrero (2,621), El Molino (2,176), Benito Juárez (1,967), classified as urban, and Cruces (1,206), and Independencia (Cologachi) (1,088), classified as rural.
