= Santa Isabel, Chihuahua =

Town in the Mexican state of Chihuahua

Santa Isabel
- Town
- Municipality of Santa Isabel in Chihuahua

- Location in Mexico
- Coordinates: 28°20′32″N 106°22′6″W
- Country: Mexico
- State: Chihuahua
- Municipality: Santa Isabel

Population (2010)
  - Total: 1,378

Santa Isabel is a small town in the Mexican state of Chihuahua. It serves as the municipal seat for the surrounding municipality of Santa Isabel.

On January 10, 1916, the town was the location of the Santa Isabel massacre.

As of 2010, the town of Santa Isabel had a population of 1,378, down from 1,412 as of 2005.
