= Bocoyna Municipality =

Municipality in the Mexican state of Chihuahua

Bocoyna
- Municipality
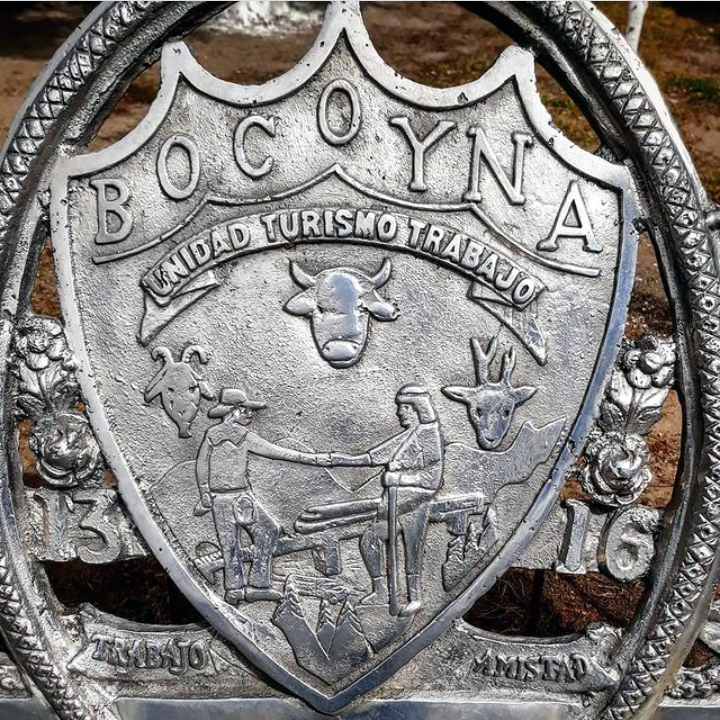
- Coat of arms

- Municipality of Bocoyna in Chihuahua

- Location in Mexico
- Coordinates: 27°51′N 107°35′W
- Country: Mexico
- State: Chihuahua
- Municipal seat: Bocoyna

Area
  - Total: 2,801.8 km^{2} (1,081.8 sq mi)

Population (2010)
  - Total: 28,766

Bocoyna is one of the 67 municipalities of Chihuahua, in northern Mexico. The municipal seat lies at Bocoyna. The municipality covers an area of 2,801.8 km^{2}.

As of 2010, the municipality had a total population of 28,766, down from 29,907 as of 2005.

As of 2010, the town of Bocoyna had a population of 796. Other than the town of Bocoyna, the municipality had 633 localities, the largest of which (with 2010 populations in parentheses) were: San Juanito (10,535), classified as urban, and Creel (5,026) and Sisoguichi (1,097), classified as rural.

The municipality and its seat are located on the route of the Chihuahua Pacific Railroad.

== Geography ==
=== Towns and villages ===
Name	Population (2005)
San Juanito	9,938
Creel	5,338
Sisoguichi	1,051
Bocoyna	735
Sojahuachi	411
Panalachi	351
Total Municipality	29,907
