= Matachí =

Town in the Mexican state of Chihuahua

- Town

- Location in Mexico
- Coordinates: 28°50′35″N 107°45′20″W
- Country: Mexico
- State: Chihuahua
- Municipality: Matachí

Population (2010)
  - Total: 1,710

Matachí is a town and seat of the municipality of Matachí, in the northern Mexican state of Chihuahua. As of 2010, the town of Matachí had a population of 1,710.
