= San Nicolás de Carretas =

Town in the Mexican state of Chihuahua

- Town
- San Nicolás de Carretas is located in the Municipality of Gran Morelos

- Location in Mexico
- Coordinates: 28°14′56″N 106°30′36″W
- Country: Mexico
- State: Chihuahua
- Municipality: Gran Morelos
- Founded (mission): 1688

Population (2010)
  - Total: 726
- Town Fiesta: 10 September

San Nicolás de Carretas, also known as Gran Morelos, is a town in the Mexican state of Chihuahua. It serves as the municipal seat for the surrounding municipality of Gran Morelos. As of 2010, the town had a population of 726.

San Nicolás de Carretas was founded as a Franciscan mission in 1688.
