= Moris Municipality =

Municipality in the Mexican state of Chihuahua

Moris
- Municipality
- Municipality of Moris in Chihuahua

- Location in Mexico
- Coordinates: 28°8′55″N 108°31′21″W
- Country: Mexico
- State: Chihuahua
- Municipal seat: Moris

Area
  - Total: 2,219.7 km^{2} (857.0 sq mi)

Population (2010)
  - Total: 5,312
  - Density: 2.393/km^{2} (6.198/sq mi)

Moris is one of the 67 municipalities of Chihuahua, in north-western Mexico. The municipal seat lies at Moris. The municipality covers an area of 2,219.7 km^{2}.

As of 2010, the municipality had a total population of 5,312, up from 5,144 as of 2005.

As of 2010, the town of Moris had a population of 1,799. Other than the town of Moris, the municipality had 183 localities, none of which had a population over 1,000.

== Geography ==
=== Towns and villages ===
The municipality has 119 localities. The largest are:

Name	Population (2005)
Moris	1,158
El Pilar	379
La Cieneguita de Rodríguez	236
Talayotes	215
Ciénega del Pilar	211
Sierra Obscura	156
Total Municipality	5,144
