= Cusihuiriachi Municipality =

Municipality in the Mexican state of Chihuahua

Cusihuiriachi
- Municipality
- Municipality of Cusihuiriachi in Chihuahua

- Location in Mexico
- Coordinates: 28°14′28″N 106°50′12″W
- Country: Mexico
- State: Chihuahua
- Municipal seat: Cusihuiriachi

Area
  - Municipality: 1,810.3 km^{2} (699.0 sq mi)
- Elevation: 2,017 m (6,617 ft)

Population (2010)
  - Municipality: 5,414
  - Urban: 63

Cusihuiriachi is one of the 67 municipalities of Chihuahua, in northern Mexico. The municipal seat lies at Cusihuiriachi. The municipality covers an area of 1,810.3 km^{2}.

As of 2010, the municipality had a total population of 5,414 inhabitants. Cusihuiriachi Municipality has the distinction of having the smallest municipal seat in Mexico relative to its municipal population. Its municipal seat had an official population of 63 inhabitants, which accounted for only 1.164 percent of the municipality's population. (There are three municipal seats that are less populous, Santa María del Rosario, Santa María Nduayaco, and Santa Cruz Tayata, all in the State of Oaxaca, but their municipalities are also much less populous than Cusihuiriachi.)

== Geography ==
=== Towns and villages ===
The largest localities (all rural) are listed below. Note that the only urban locality, the municipal seat, Cusihuiriachi, with a population of 63 inhabitants, is not among them.

Name	Population
Los Álamos de Cerro Prieto	614
Cerro Prieto (Cerro Prieto de Abajo)	400
Chopeque	378
Colonia Cusi (Ojo de Agua)	307
Campo Número Veintiséis	266
Campo Número Veintiocho	260
Bajío de Abajo	208
Total Municipality	5,414
