= Cumbre Tunnel =

Railroad tunnel in Chihuahua, Mexico

Cumbre Tunnel served Bosques de Chihuahua, a logging railroad in Copper Canyon, Chihuahua, Mexico. In 1914 the tunnel was obstructed by a hijacked train which was set afire. A replacement tunnel had to be constructed east of the former tunnel.
