= Ignacio Zaragoza Municipality =

Municipality in the Mexican state of Chihuahua

Ignacio Zaragoza
- Municipality
- Municipality of Ignacio Zaragoza in Chihuahua

- Location in Mexico
- Coordinates: 29°38′36″N 107°45′50″W
- Country: Mexico
- State: Chihuahua
- Municipal seat: Ignacio Zaragoza
- Founded: May 24, 1941

Area
  - Total: 2,130.9 km^{2} (822.7 sq mi)

Population (2010)
  - Total: 6,934

Ignacio Zaragoza is one of the 67 municipalities of Chihuahua, in northern Mexico, named after Ignacio Zaragoza. The municipal seat lies at Ignacio Zaragoza town. The municipality covers an area of 2,130.9 km^{2}.

As of 2010, the municipality had a total population of 6,934, up from 6,631 as of 2005.

As of 2010, the town of Ignacio Zaragoza had a population of 3,518. Other than the town of Ignacio Zaragoza, the municipality had 105 localities, none of which had a population over 1,000.

== Geography ==
=== Towns and villages ===
The municipality has 43 localities. The largest are:

| Name | Population (2005) |
|---|---|
| Ignacio Zaragoza | 3,190 |
| Ignacio Allende | 790 |
| Francisco I. Madero | 672 |
| Abraham González | 364 |
| El Saucito | 297 |
| Total Municipality | 6631 |
