= Moris, Chihuahua =

Town in the Mexican state of Chihuahua

Moris
- Town
- Location in Mexico Moris (Chihuahua)
- Coordinates: 28°8′57″N 108°31′10″W
- Country: Mexico
- State: Chihuahua
- Municipality: Moris
- Elevation: 757 m (2,484 ft)

Population (2010)
  - Total: 1,799

Moris is a town and seat of Moris Municipality, in the northern Mexican state of Chihuahua. As of 2010, the town of Moris had a population of 1,799, up from 1,158 as of 2005.

== Geography ==
=== Climate ===
Moris has a Mediterranean climate (Köppen Csa), with hot summers and mild winters, often presenting freezing temperatures. The highest temperature ever recorded in Moris is 51.5 °C (125 °F), recorded in June 2014, and a low temperature of −7.0 °C (19 °F) was recorded in January 1977.

Climate data for Moris, Chihuahua (1981–2010, extremes (1972–present)
Month	Jan	Feb	Mar	Apr	May	Jun	Jul	Aug	Sep	Oct	Nov	Dec	Year
Record high °C (°F)	32.0 (89.6)	37.0 (98.6)	39.0 (102.2)	45.0 (113.0)	45.0 (113.0)	51.5 (124.7)	44.0 (111.2)	43.0 (109.4)	42.0 (107.6)	39.0 (102.2)	36.0 (96.8)	38.0 (100.4)	51.5 (124.7)
Mean daily maximum °C (°F)	24.4 (75.9)	26.1 (79.0)	28.9 (84.0)	32.4 (90.3)	36.3 (97.3)	38.2 (100.8)	35.1 (95.2)	34.4 (93.9)	34.0 (93.2)	31.1 (88.0)	27.9 (82.2)	24.0 (75.2)	31.1 (88.0)
Daily mean °C (°F)	13.4 (56.1)	14.8 (58.6)	17.3 (63.1)	20.4 (68.7)	24.4 (75.9)	28.2 (82.8)	27.4 (81.3)	26.8 (80.2)	25.8 (78.4)	21.3 (70.3)	17.1 (62.8)	13.2 (55.8)	20.8 (69.4)
Mean daily minimum °C (°F)	2.3 (36.1)	3.4 (38.1)	5.7 (42.3)	8.5 (47.3)	12.5 (54.5)	18.2 (64.8)	19.6 (67.3)	19.1 (66.4)	17.6 (63.7)	11.5 (52.7)	6.4 (43.5)	2.4 (36.3)	10.6 (51.1)
Record low °C (°F)	−7.0 (19.4)	−4.0 (24.8)	−5.0 (23.0)	−1.0 (30.2)	2.0 (35.6)	10.0 (50.0)	10.0 (50.0)	7.0 (44.6)	10.0 (50.0)	0.9 (33.6)	−4.0 (24.8)	−4.0 (24.8)	−7.0 (19.4)
Average precipitation mm (inches)	41.2 (1.62)	17.1 (0.67)	10.0 (0.39)	7.8 (0.31)	9.4 (0.37)	43.0 (1.69)	108.5 (4.27)	85.4 (3.36)	52.1 (2.05)	25.4 (1.00)	9.3 (0.37)	24.8 (0.98)	434.0 (17.09)
Average precipitation days (≥ 0.1 mm)	3.1	1.1	0.7	0.8	0.7	3.0	7.8	6.4	3.8	0.9	0.8	2.2	31.1
Source: Servicio Metereológico Nacional (Average temperatures, 1981-2010 - Extreme temperatures, 1972-2014)
