= Ignacio Zaragoza, Chihuahua =

City in the Mexican state of Chihuahua

Ignacio Zaragoza
- City
- Location in Mexico
- Coordinates: 30°11′0″N 108°19′35″W
- Country: Mexico
- State: Chihuahua
- Municipality: Ignacio Zaragoza

Government

Population (2010)
  - Total: 3,518

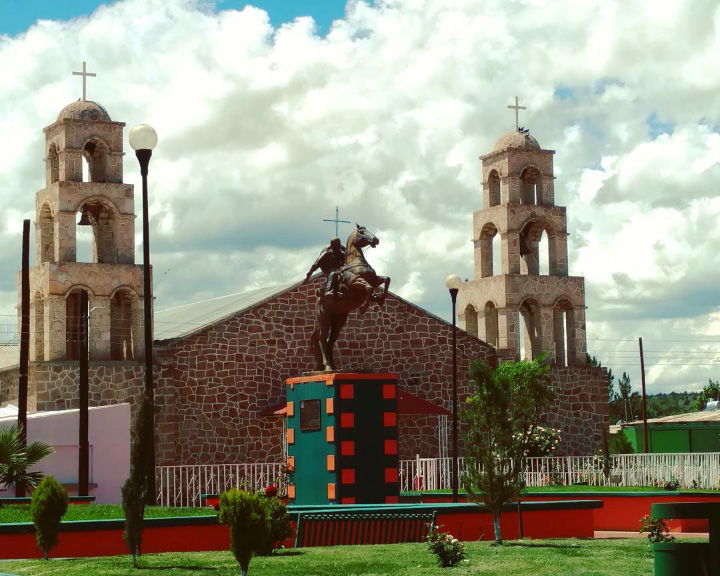
Templo in Ignacio Zaragoza, Chihuahua

Ignacio Zaragoza is a city and seat of the municipality of Ignacio Zaragoza, in the northern Mexican state of Chihuahua. As of 2010, the town of Ignacio Zaragoza had a population of 3,518, up from 3,190 as of 2005.
