= Santa Isabel Municipality =

Municipality in the Mexican state of Chihuahua

Santa Isabel
- Municipality
- Municipality of Santa Isabel in Chihuahua

- Location in Mexico
- Coordinates: 28°20′32″N 106°22′6″W
- Country: Mexico
- State: Chihuahua
- Municipal seat: Santa Isabel
- Founded: July 19, 1823

Area
  - Total: 1,040.8 km^{2} (401.9 sq mi)

Population (2010)
  - Total: 3,937
- Time zone: UTC-6 (Zona Centro)

Santa Isabel is one of the 67 municipalities of Chihuahua, in northern Mexico. The municipal seat lies at Santa Isabel. The municipality covers an area of 1,040.8 km^{2}.

Between 1932 and 1993 the municipality was called General Trías, in honour of General Ángel Trías Álvarez, who served eight terms as governor of Chihuahua in the 19th century.

As of 2010, the municipality had a total population of 3,937, up from 3,820 as of 2005. By 2020, it had fallen to 3,791.

As of 2010, the town of Santa Isabel had a population of 1,378. Other than the town of Santa Isabel, the municipality had 52 localities, none of which had a population over 1,000.

== Geography ==
=== Towns and villages ===
The municipality has 27 localities. The largest are:

Name	Population (2005)
Santa Isabel	1,412
San Miguel de los Anchondo	449
Santa Ana	388
Rancho de Peña	327
Total Municipality	3,820
