= Gran Morelos Municipality =

Municipality in the Mexican state of Chihuahua

Gran Morelos
- Municipality
- Municipality of Gran Morelos in Chihuahua

- Location in Mexico
- Coordinates: 28°14′56″N 106°30′36″W
- Country: Mexico
- State: Chihuahua
- Municipal seat: San Nicolás de Carretas

Government
  - Municipal President: Pedro Efrén Montes Pérez (PRI)

Area
  - Total: 424.2 km^{2} (163.8 sq mi)

Population (2010)
  - Total: 3,209

Gran Morelos is one of the 67 municipalities of Chihuahua, in northern Mexico. The municipal seat lies at San Nicolás de Carretas. The municipality covers an area of 424.2 km^{2}.

As of 2010, the municipality had a total population of 3,209, up from 3,092 as of 2005.

The municipality had 48 localities, none of which had a population over 1,000.

Settlements in the municipality
