= Matachí Municipality =

Municipality in the Mexican state of Chihuahua

Matachí
- Municipality

- Municipality of Matachí in Chihuahua

- Location in Mexico
- Coordinates: 28°50′33″N 107°34′50″W
- Country: Mexico
- State: Chihuahua
- Municipal seat: Matachí
- Founded: November 21, 1844

Area
  - Total: 829.8 km^{2} (320.4 sq mi)

Population (2010)
  - Total: 3,104
  - Density: 3.741/km^{2} (9.688/sq mi)

Matachí is one of the 67 municipalities of Chihuahua, in northern Mexico. The municipal seat lies at Matachí. The municipality covers an area of 829.8 km^{2}.

As of 2010, the municipality had a total population of 3,104, down from 3,169 as of 2005.

As of 2010, the town of Matachí had a population of 1,710. Other than the town of Matachí, the municipality had 78 localities, none of which had a population over 1,000.

== Geography ==
=== Towns and villages ===
The municipality has 28 localities. The largest are:

Name	Population (2005)
Matachí	1,745
Tejolocachi	395
Ejido Buenavista	386
Total Municipio	3,169
