= Ocampo, Chihuahua =

Town in the Mexican state of Chihuahua

Ocampo
- Town
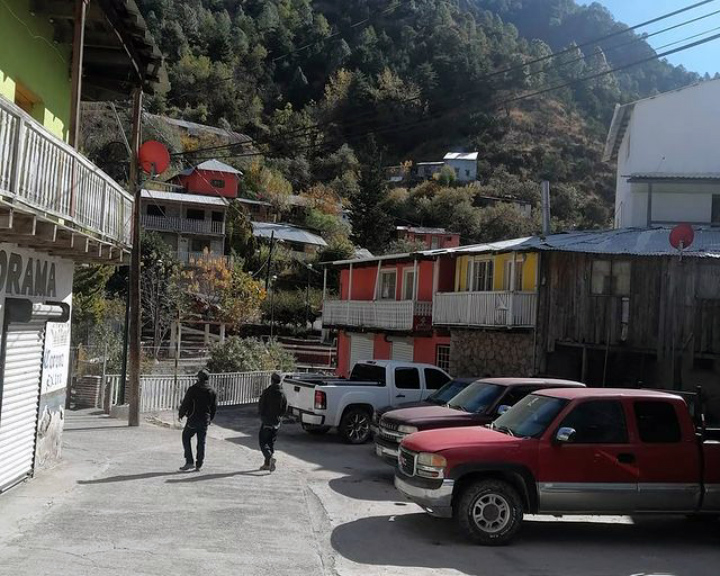

- Location in Mexico
- Coordinates: 28°11′36″N 108°22′00″W
- Country: Mexico
- State: Chihuahua
- Municipality: Ocampo

Population (2010)
  - Total: 527

Melchor Ocampo, more commonly simply Ocampo is a town and seat of the municipality of Ocampo, in the northern Mexican state of Chihuahua. As of 2010, the town had a population of 527.

Originally settled as Jesús María, in 1861 it changed its name to honour recently assassinated Melchor Ocampo.
