= Ciudad Cuauhtémoc, Chihuahua =

City in the Mexican state of Chihuahua

Cuauhtémoc San Antonio de los Arenales
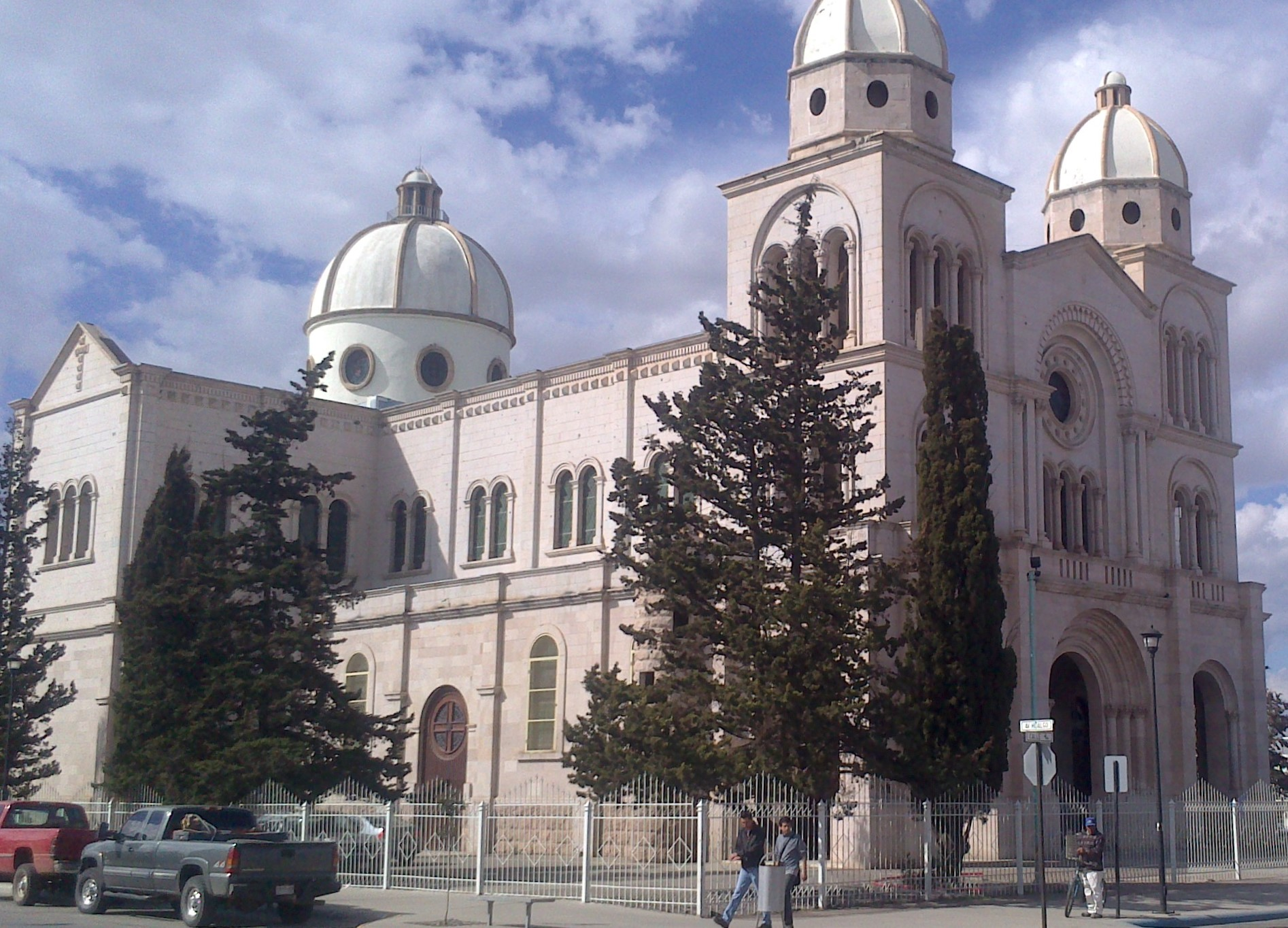
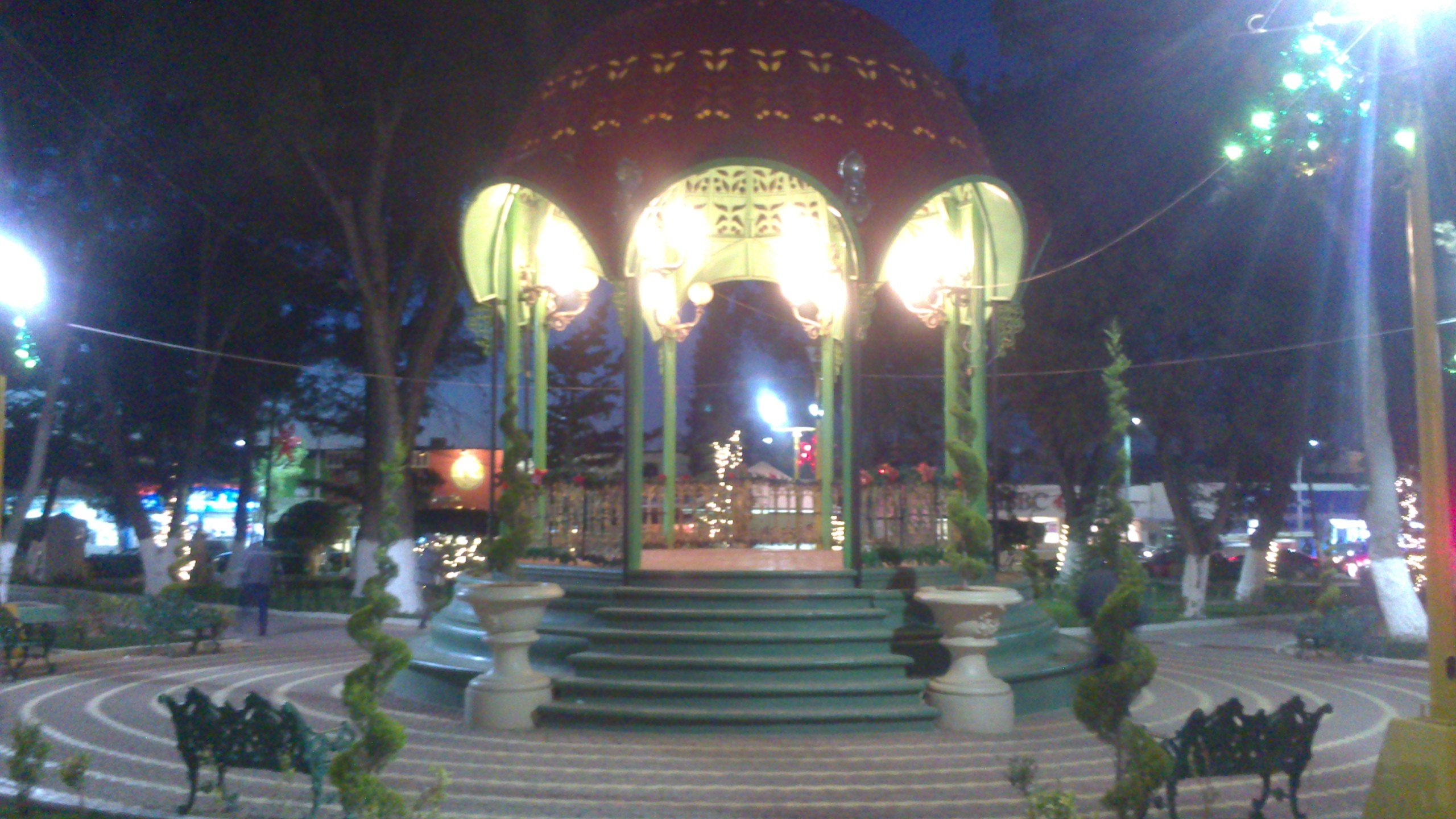
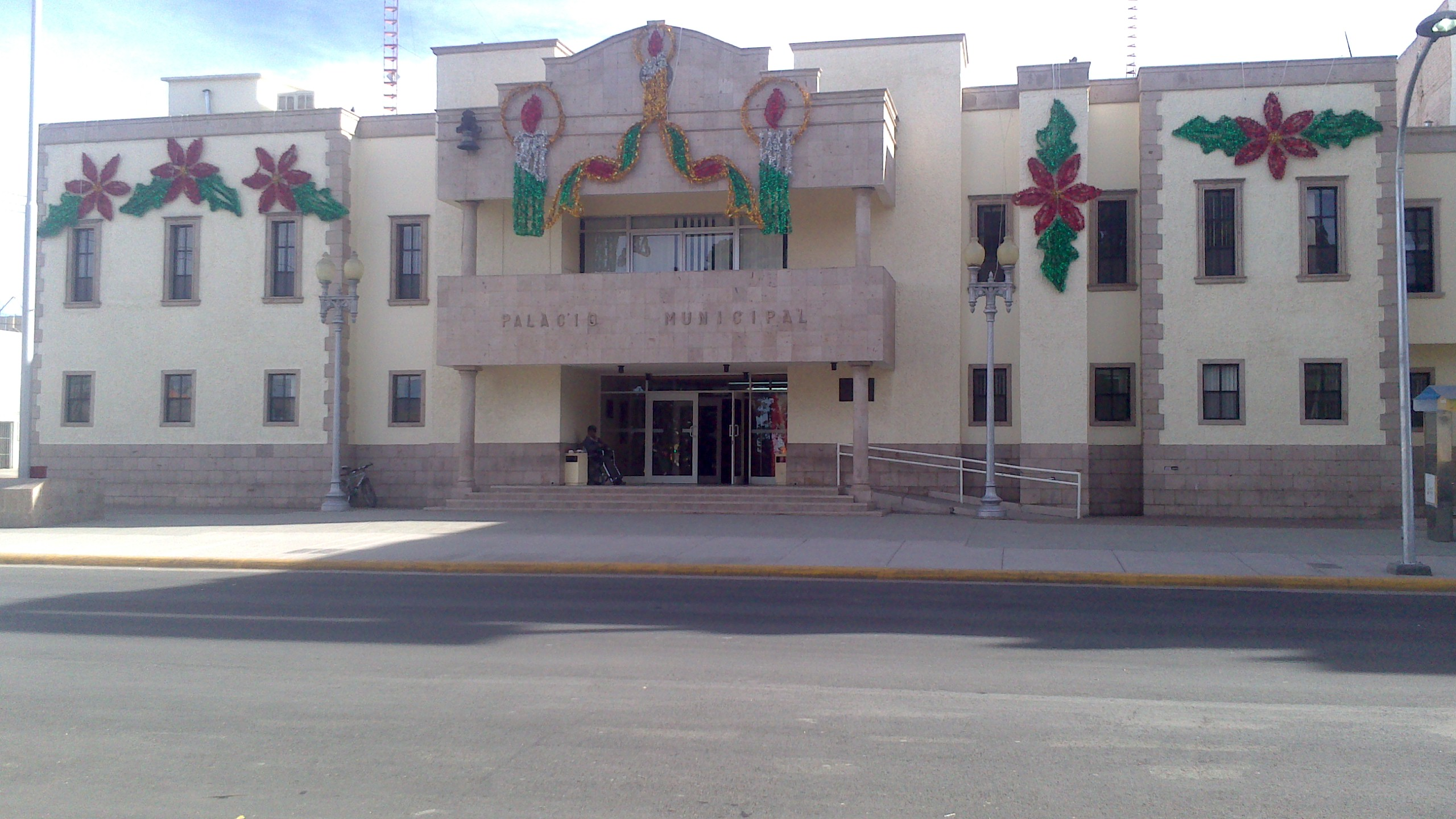
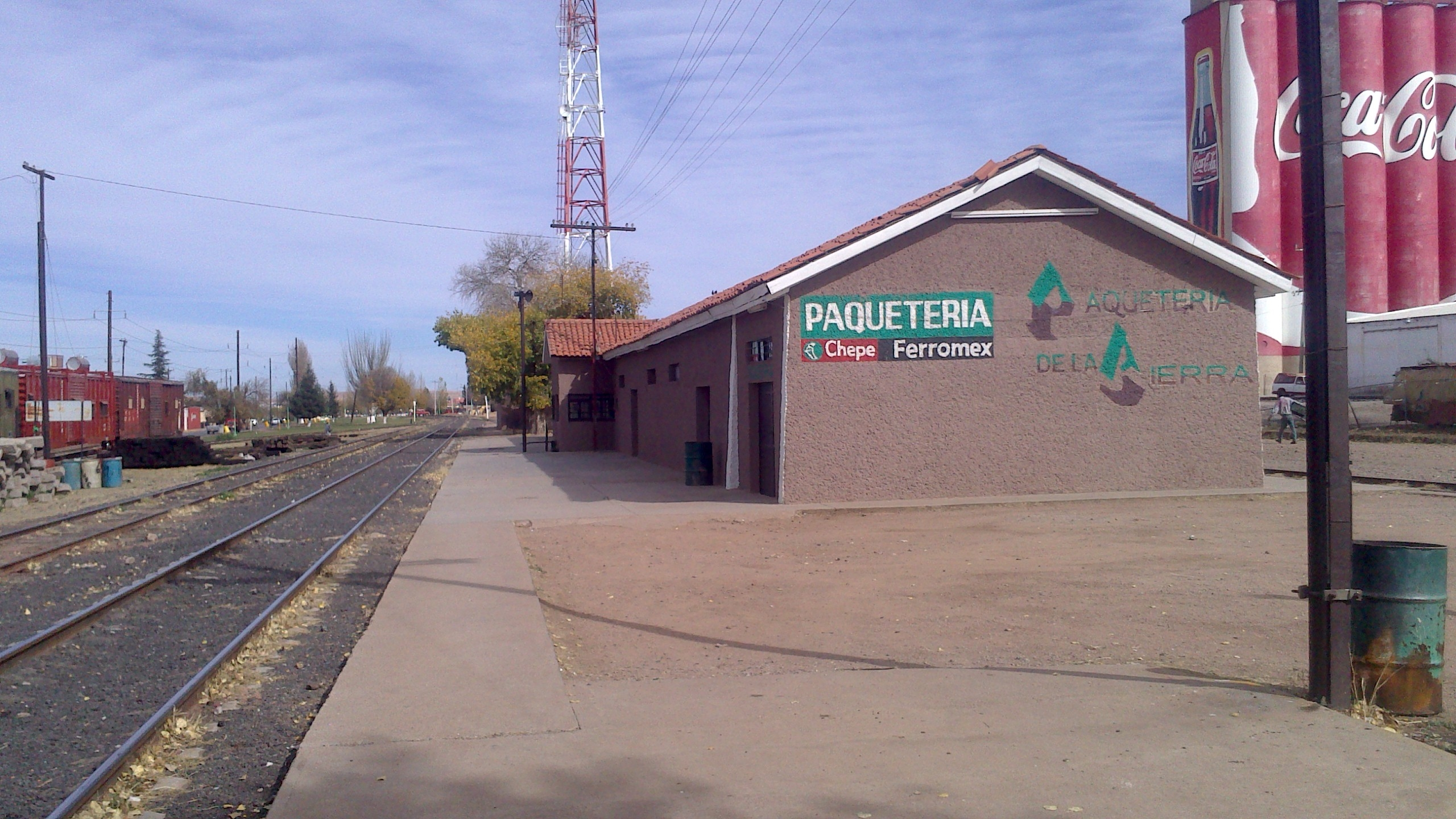
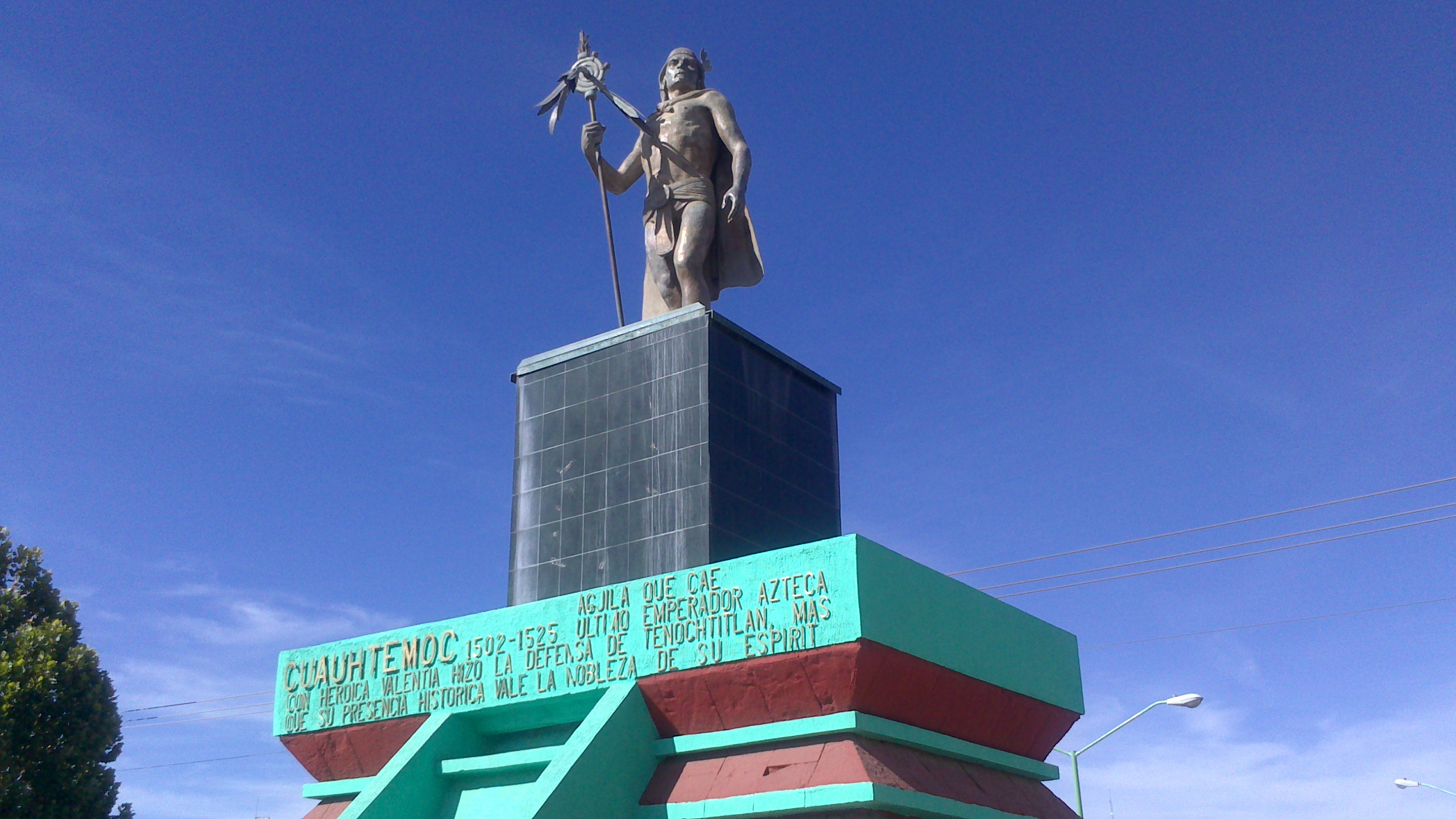
- From up to down and left to right: Cathedral of San Antonio, Main Plaza Kiosko, Cuauhtémoc City Hall, Train Station, Statue of Cuauhtémoc

- Location within Mexico
- Coordinates: 28°24′18″N 106°52′00″W
- Country: Mexico
- State: Chihuahua
- Municipality (Mexico): Cuauhtémoc
- Foundation: January 9, 1948

Government
  - Mayor: Elías Humberto Pérez Mendoza (PAN)
- Elevation: 2,060 m (6,760 ft)

Population (2015)
  - Total: 168,482
  - Demonym: Cuauhtemense
- Time zone: UTC−06:00 (Central)
- Postal code: 31500
- Climate: BSk

Cuauhtémoc (Spanish pronunciation: [kwawˈtemok]; Mennonite Low German: Cuauhtemoc-Staut) is a city located in the west-central part of the Mexican state of Chihuahua. It serves as the seat of the municipality of Cuauhtémoc. The city lies 103 km (64 mi) west of the state capital of Chihuahua. As of 2015, the city of Cuauhtémoc had a population of 168,482. Three languages are recognized as official in the city: Spanish, English, and Plautdietsch.

The population in 1953 was just under 3,000, composed almost entirely of Mexicans with the exception of foreign-born people who had gone there as traders. The town of Cuauhtémoc grew significantly after the coming of the Mennonites to the area in the 1920s, for whom the city was a shopping destination. A railroad, a highway, and a bus line connected Cuauhtémoc with Chihuahua City. The city is also known as "The City of Three Cultures", where the Mennonites, Mestizos and Rarámuri coexist. The city also produces the most apples in the country, producing around 70% - 90% of the country's production.

== History ==
Before the 1920s, the city was a town called "San Antonio de los Arenales", that only had a few shops and a railroad station connecting Cusihuiriachi to Chihuahua City. It has been inhabited by the Raramuri and the Mestizos. With the arrival of the Mennonites, the city grew significantly as it became a trading center for the Mennonites. The formidable agricultural, livestock, and commercial activity that characterized Villa Cuauhtémoc around 1947 unleashed a contagious spirit in the municipal administration of Emilio Miramontes Ordóñez. The State Congress was petitioned by the mayor, the City Council, and economic and social representatives to recognize Cuauhtemoc as a city. The railroad's passage through the Zuloaga estate's domains and the construction of a train station made what had appeared to be one of the ranches in the Cusihuiráchic jurisdiction in 1933—named San Antonio—more significant. It became a shipping point for the region's livestock and agricultural products as well as the rich minerals from Cusihuiráchic and other mountain mining centers. With work and the need to sell food, produce and logging, the construction of emergency housing of the well-known merchants began near the train station. The first 16 blocks laid out by the Zuloaga family were given to the ranchers, tenant farmers, and sharecroppers from El Moyote, Ojo Caliente, Arroyo de Dolores, and Napavéchic due to the pressing need to relocate. This marked the beginning of the urbanization of this population center and defined the apparent chaos of the early constructions.

=== Establishment as a Municipality ===
The population increased as Cuauhtemoc began developing as a municipality. The same year it was established as a Municipal section of Cusihuiriachi called "San Antonio de los Arenales". The Chihuahua Congress resolved to make San Antonio de los Arenales an independent municipality, giving it its status as one and honoring the last Aztec king, Cuauhtémoc.

Cuauhtémoc became a city on January 9, 1948, when Governor Fernando Foglio Miramontes issued a decree.

== Geography ==
=== Climate ===
Cuauhtémoc has a semi-arid climate (Köppen climate classification BSk) moderated by its altitude. Winter days are cool and sunny with a January high of 15.6 °C (60.1 °F), while winter nights are cold with temperatures usually below freezing. The city usually sees 1 or 2 snowfalls per year. Summers are warm with June being the warmest month with an average high temperature of 29.5 °C (85.1 °F). Most of the precipitation falls during this time of the year, during the monsoon season. The highest recorded temperature was 40.0 °C (104.0 °F) on June 9, 1995, while the lowest recorded temperature was −18 °C (−0.4 °F) on December 30, 1975.

Climate data for Cuauhtémoc, Chihuahua
| Month | Jan | Feb | Mar | Apr | May | Jun | Jul | Aug | Sep | Oct | Nov | Dec | Year |
|---|---|---|---|---|---|---|---|---|---|---|---|---|---|
| Record high °C (°F) | 27.0 (80.6) | 28.0 (82.4) | 33.0 (91.4) | 36.0 (96.8) | 38.0 (100.4) | 40.0 (104.0) | 38.5 (101.3) | 37.0 (98.6) | 36.0 (96.8) | 32.0 (89.6) | 31.5 (88.7) | 29.0 (84.2) | 40.0 (104.0) |
| Mean daily maximum °C (°F) | 15.6 (60.1) | 18.0 (64.4) | 20.1 (68.2) | 23.7 (74.7) | 26.4 (79.5) | 29.5 (85.1) | 26.9 (80.4) | 26.2 (79.2) | 24.8 (76.6) | 22.8 (73.0) | 19.2 (66.6) | 17.1 (62.8) | 22.5 (72.5) |
| Daily mean °C (°F) | 5.9 (42.6) | 7.4 (45.3) | 9.5 (49.1) | 12.9 (55.2) | 15.8 (60.4) | 19.5 (67.1) | 19.1 (66.4) | 18.6 (65.5) | 16.7 (62.1) | 12.7 (54.9) | 8.8 (47.8) | 6.7 (44.1) | 12.8 (55.0) |
| Mean daily minimum °C (°F) | −3.8 (25.2) | −3.2 (26.2) | −1.0 (30.2) | 2.0 (35.6) | 5.2 (41.4) | 9.5 (49.1) | 11.2 (52.2) | 10.9 (51.6) | 8.6 (47.5) | 2.6 (36.7) | −1.5 (29.3) | −3.7 (25.3) | 3.1 (37.6) |
| Record low °C (°F) | −17.0 (1.4) | −16.0 (3.2) | −12.0 (10.4) | −7.0 (19.4) | −3.0 (26.6) | 2.0 (35.6) | 2.0 (35.6) | 3.0 (37.4) | −1.5 (29.3) | −6.5 (20.3) | −12.0 (10.4) | −18.0 (−0.4) | −18.0 (−0.4) |
| Average precipitation mm (inches) | 11.4 (0.45) | 2.6 (0.10) | 7.2 (0.28) | 7.7 (0.30) | 16.5 (0.65) | 44.4 (1.75) | 107.7 (4.24) | 117.4 (4.62) | 89.8 (3.54) | 31.7 (1.25) | 9.6 (0.38) | 9.3 (0.37) | 455.3 (17.93) |
| Average precipitation days (≥ 0.1 mm) | 2.2 | 1.0 | 1.1 | 1.8 | 2.3 | 7.2 | 14.3 | 14.1 | 10.9 | 3.5 | 1.8 | 1.9 | 62.1 |
| Average snowy days | 0.50 | 0.35 | 0.25 | 0 | 0 | 0 | 0 | 0 | 0 | 0 | 0.25 | 0.35 | 1.70 |
Source 1: Servicio Meteorológico National
Source 2: Colegio de Postgraduados (snowy days)

== Transportation ==
In the early 1950s, there were no improved roads leading from the hinterland into Cuauhtémoc. A four-lane highway, completed in 1986, connected the city with the city of Chihuahua, the state capital. Another highway connected Cuauhtémoc with Col. Anahuac, where a large pulp mill is located. The Gran Vision highway, which is to be continued to the west coast through the Sierra Madre Occidental mountains, joins the city to the western hinterlands, and another highway leaving the city passes through the Mennonite colonies to the north (Manitoba Colony).

Cuauhtémoc is a stop on the Ferrocarril Chihuahua al Pacífico, which connects Chihuahua City with Copper Canyon and Los Mochis.

| Preceding station | Ferromex | Following station |
|---|---|---|
| La Junta toward Los Mochis | Chepe Regional | Chihuahua Terminus |
Former services
| Preceding station | N de M | Following station |
| Casa Colorada toward Topolobampo | Ferrocarril Chihuahua al Pacífico | Anahuac toward Ojinaga |

== Economy ==
The apple industry, introduced to the area by a former Old Colony Mennonite, Enrique Wiebe, has contributed much to the rapid growth of the city, particularly with large apple corporations such as Grupo La Norteñita. The influx of American industry in the mid-1980s, is also attracting people from all over the Republic. Doctors, dentists, and lawyers abound. Elementary, secondary, preparatory, and technology schools are numerous. One agricultural school, incorporated with the University of Chihuahua, is located in Cuauhtémoc, and the one incorporated Mennonite elementary and secondary school, Alvaro Obregon, was located on the outskirts at Quinta Lupita, but is at Km. 11 (Blumenau) since 1990.

== Mennonites ==
The Cuauhtémoc area is the home of around 50,000 Plautdietsch-speaking Mennonites who live in the following colonies mostly north of the city: Manitoba Colony, Swift Current Colony, Ojo de la Yegua Colony, Santa Rita Colony, Santa Clara Colony and Los Jagueyes Colony.

The Mennonites settled in the San Antonio Valley, as far as 120 km (75 mi.) to the north of the town. There was a General Conference Mennonite Church in the town composed almost entirely of Mennonite refugees who came to Mexico after World War I. The growth of the Mennonite population due to natural increase and to additional immigration from Canada stimulated its economic activities. A small cereal factory was established by non-Mennonites, while a large cheese factory, slaughterhouse, and ice plant were erected by Mennonites (the Redekops) in the town. In 1947, the Mennonite Central Committee established a service unit in Cuauhtémoc to provide health services, recreational direction, and assistance in educational activities of German-speaking children.

Although the city, formerly called San Antonio de los Arenales, developed only after the arrival of the Old Colony Mennonites in 1922, it has practically no Mennonites living in it. However, the streets and the numerous banks teem with them, especially on Monday mornings. Cuauhtémoc is the most important commercial center for Old Colony Mennonites in Chihuahua.

In the early 1930s, the recent Mennonite immigrants from the Soviet Union (Rußländer) formed a Mennonite congregation in the town, but by 1987, it had ceased to exist. The few Mennonite families and General Conference Mennonite Church and Mennonite Central Committee workers living in the city in 1986 (five families and five singles) worshipped mostly at the General Conference congregation at Kilometro 11. Cuauhtémoc was the first city to erect a senior citizens home under public or government jurisdiction. Its first matron was a Mennonite, Maria Giesbrecht, from the Santa Rita Colony (Nord Colony).
