= Cusihuiriachi =

Town in the Mexican state of Chihuahua

- Town
- The town is located within the Municipality of Cusihuiriachi in Chihuahua

- Location in Mexico
- Coordinates: 28°14′28″N 106°50′12″W
- Country: Mexico
- State: Chihuahua
- Municipality: Cusihuiriachi
- Elevation: 2,017 m (6,617 ft)

Population (2010)
  - Total: 63
- Postal code: 33240
- Demonym: Cusihuiriachiteco

Cusihuiriachi is a town in the Mexican state of Chihuahua. Although it is now practically a ghost town, it serves as the municipal seat for the surrounding municipality of the same name. "Cusihuiriachi" is a Tarahumara word meaning "erect pole".

Cusihuiriachi's population has fallen dramatically over the past century, from 1,755 in 1900 to 75 in 2005. By the 2010 census, it was down to 63. This was largely due to the closure of the local silver mines.

== Notable people ==
- Salvador Zubirán, rector of the National Autonomous University of Mexico, founder of the National Nutritional Institute.
