= Ocampo Municipality, Chihuahua =

Municipality in the Mexican state of Chihuahua

Ocampo
- Municipality
- Municipality of Ocampo in Chihuahua

- Location in Mexico
- Coordinates: 28°11′36″N 108°22′01″W
- Country: Mexico
- State: Chihuahua
- Municipal seat: Ocampo

Area
  - Total: 2,037.23 km^{2} (786.58 sq mi)

Population (2010)
  - Total: 7,546
  - Density: 3.704/km^{2} (9.593/sq mi)

Ocampo is one of the 67 municipalities of Chihuahua, in north-western Mexico. The municipal seat lies at Ocampo. The municipality covers an area of 2,037.23 km^{2}.

As of 2010, the municipality had a total population of 7,546, up from 6,298 as of 2005.

The municipality had 220 localities, the largest of which (with 2010 population in parentheses) was: Basaseachi (1,248), classified as rural.

== Geography ==
=== Towns and villages ===
The municipality has 141 localities. The largest are:

Name	Population (2005)
Basaseachi	806
Cajurichi	647
Ocampo	615
Huevachi	235
Cahuisori	231
Total Municipality	6,298
