= San Bernardo =

San Bernardo may refer to:

== Places ==
=== Mexico ===
- San Bernardo, Baja California Sur
- San Bernardo, Chihuahua
- San Bernardo, Coahuila
- San Bernardo, Durango
- San Bernardo, Guanajuato (3 towns)
- San Bernardo, Hidalgo (2 towns)
- San Bernardo Tlamimilolpan, Mexico State
- San Bernardo, Oaxaca (2 towns)
- San Bernardo Mixtepec, Oaxaca
- San Bernardo, Nuevo León
- San Bernardo, Puebla
- San Bernardo, Sonora
- San Bernardo, Tabasco
- San Bernardo, Yucatán (2 towns)
- San Bernardo, Zacatecas

=== Other countries ===
- Tarija, Bolivia or San Bernardo de la Frontera de Tarija
- San Bernardo, Chile
- San Bernardo del Viento, Colombia
- San Bernardo, Nariño, Colombia
- San Bernardo, Cundinamarca, Colombia
- Archipelago of San Bernardo, a group of islands in the Caribbean belonging to Colombia
- San Bernardo del Tuyú, a city in Argentina

== Other uses ==
- San Bernardo (Madrid Metro), a railway station in Madrid, Spain
- San Bernardo alle Terme, a church in Italy
- San Bernardo (Ringling, Oklahoma), on the NRHP in Jefferson County, Oklahoma
- San Bernardo (1966 film), a Filipino film directed by Fernando Poe Jr.

== See also ==
- Bernard (disambiguation)
- San Bernardino (disambiguation)
- Saint Bernard (disambiguation)
