= Manganoan calcite =

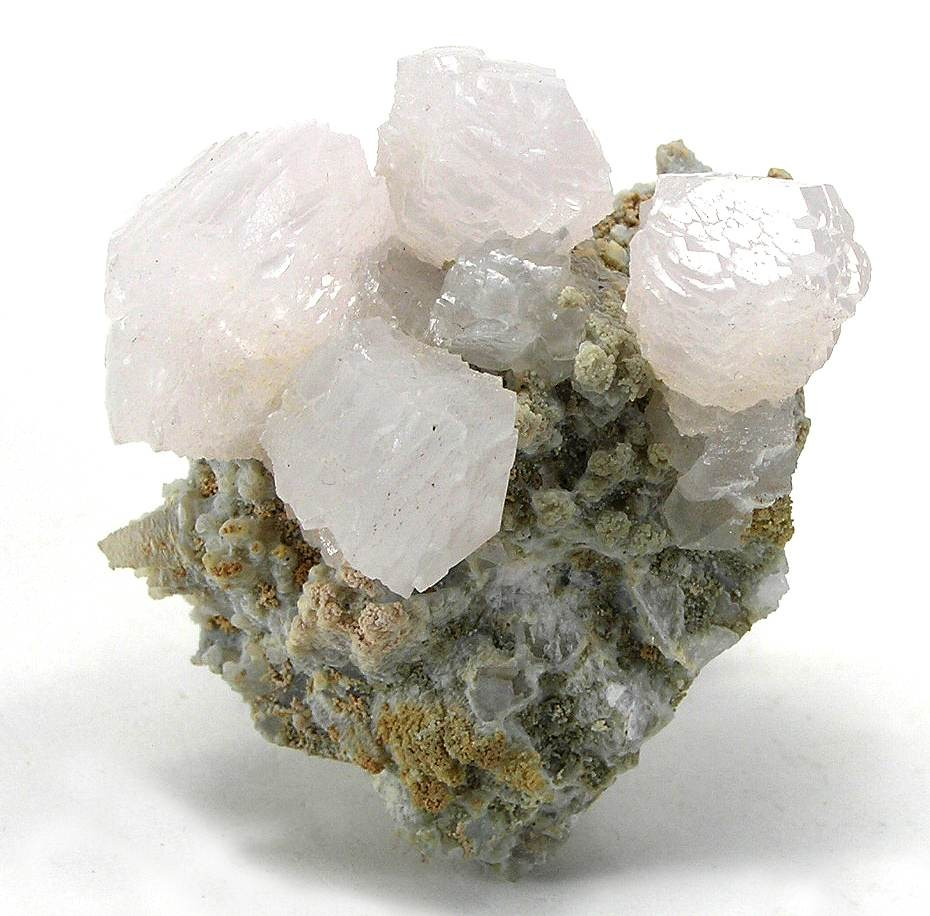
Manganocalcite

Manganoan calcite or manganocalcite is a variety of calcite rich in manganese, which gives the mineral a pink color. Its chemical formula is (Ca,Mn)CO_{3}. It was first reported from the Banská Štiavnica Mining District, Slovak Republic, but is widely distributed around the world, notably in the Cave of Swords at Naica, Chihuahua, Mexico as well as in Bulgaria.

Manganoan calcite is sometimes confused with rhodochrosite. The amount of manganese in manganoan calcite varies at different localities, and the mineral forms a solid solution series between calcite and rhodochrosite, with the color becoming redder with a higher proportion of manganese.

== See also ==
- List of minerals
