= Palace of the Counts of Anadia =

- Palácio dos Condes de Anadia
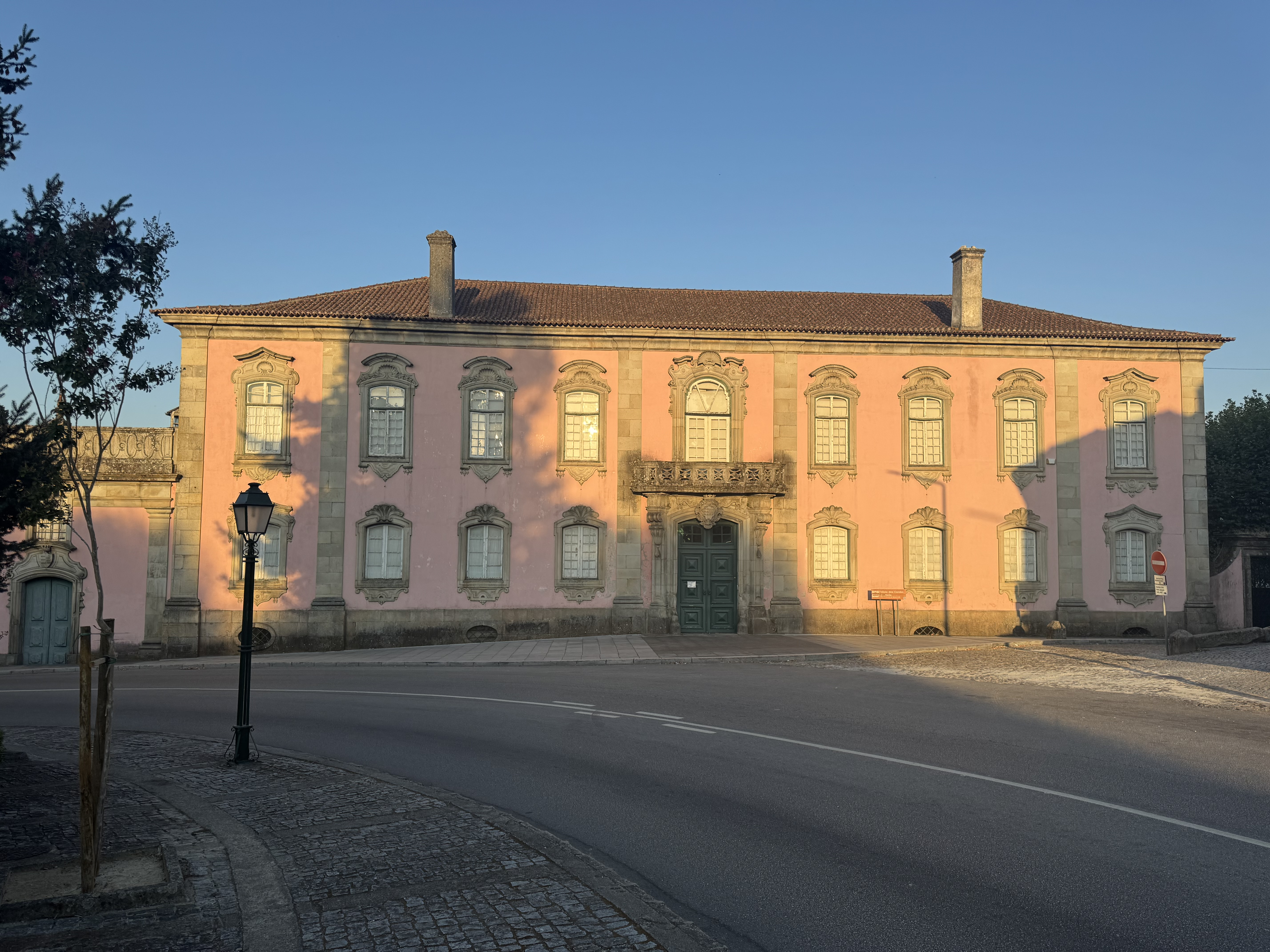
- The palace in August 2025
- Interactive map of the Palace of the Counts of Anadia area
- Alternative names: Anadia Palace; Manor of the Paes do Amaral family

General information
- Status: Completed
- Type: Palace
- Architectural style: Rococo
- Location: Mangualde, Viseu, Largo Conde de Anadia, 3530-129 Mangualde, Portugal
- Coordinates: 40.6044°N 7.7653°W
- Construction started: 17th century
- Owner: Miguel Pais do Amaral

Technical details
- Material: Granite ashlar and granite masonry

Design and construction
- Architects: Gaspar Ferreira (1701); António Mendes Coutinho (1824); José do Couto (1824)

Website
- palacioanadiamangualde.com/en/

The Palace of the Counts of Anadia (in portuguese: Palácio dos Condes de Anadia) is located in the civil parish of Mangualde, Mesquitela e Cunha Alta, in the municipality of Mangualde, district of Viseu, Portugal. This manor house was commissioned by Simão Paes do Amaral in the first half of the eighteenth century and has a Baroque architecture style, in the Dão region. It remains in the ownership of the Pais do Amaral family to this day.

The estate comprises the main residence, which includes a chapel dedicated to St Bernard, historic gardens, and woodland planted in the eighteenth century. The palace has preserved many of its original features and houses a collection of paintings, furniture, sculpture, and period costumes belonging to the family and the estate. Particularly notable are the tiles panels that decorate the principal areas of the house. The palace has been listed as a Property of Public Interest since 2014.

== History ==
The origin of the Paes do Amaral family house in Mangualde dates back to the late 16th century and has belonged to this family since the 17th century.

In 1646, Gaspar Pais do Amaral, Capitão-Mor (Captain-Major) of Azurara da Beira, established in entail the chapel he owned within the town, dedicated to St Bernard. In his will of 1654, he appointed as his successor and administrator of both his chapel and morgado his nephew Miguel Pais do Amaral, a nobleman of the Royal Household, familiar of the Holy Office, and Knight of the Order of Aviz, 5th Lord of the House of Mangualde and 1st Lord of the Morgado of St Bernard. Together with his wife, Ana do Amaral, he rebuilt the chapel of St Bernard and commissioned a new chancel (in 1683), also acquiring properties (the town hall and prison buildings) adjoining the south side of the present palace.

From 1686 onward, their son, Simão Pais do Amaral, 6th Lord of the House of Mangualde, continued to acquire further houses and lands, and in the early eighteenth century (between 1701 and 1713) began the construction of what would become the Palace of the Counts of Anadia. The building works of the Pais do Amaral residence in Mangualde were carried on by Miguel Pais do Amaral. Construction lasted for approximately a century, being completed only in the time of Simão Pais do Amaral, 9th Lord of the House of Mangualde, at the beginning of the nineteenth century, when the garden, estate, and woodland were also remodelled.

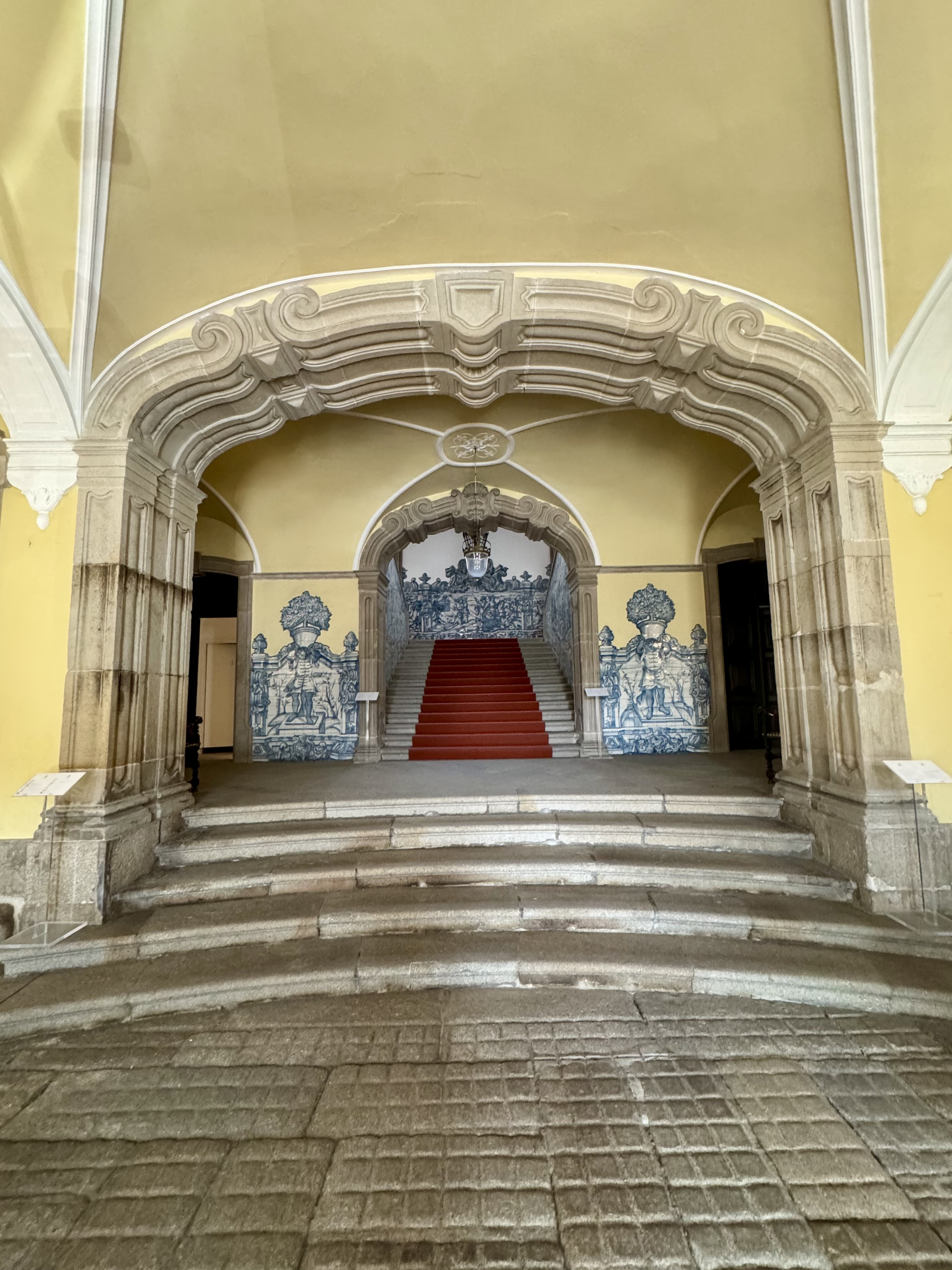
Main entrance of the palace (August 2025)

At the beginning of the nineteenth century, the Palace of the Counts of Anadia was known as the House of the Paes do Amaral. The designation of palace was adopted following the marriage of Manuel Paes de Sá do Amaral d’Almeida e Vasconcelos Quifel Barberino, 11th Lord of the House of Mangualde, to Dona Maria Luíza de Sá Pereira de Menezes Sottomayor, 3rd Countess of Anadia and 2nd Viscountess of Alverca, his maternal niece. This union consolidated the Houses of Mangualde and Anadia, a connection that had begun in 1730 with the marriage of Miguel Pais do Amaral to Dona Joaquina Teodora Sá de Menezes.

In 1810, the palace was occupied by Marshal Masséna, Prince of Essling, commander of the French army during the third French invasion of Portugal.

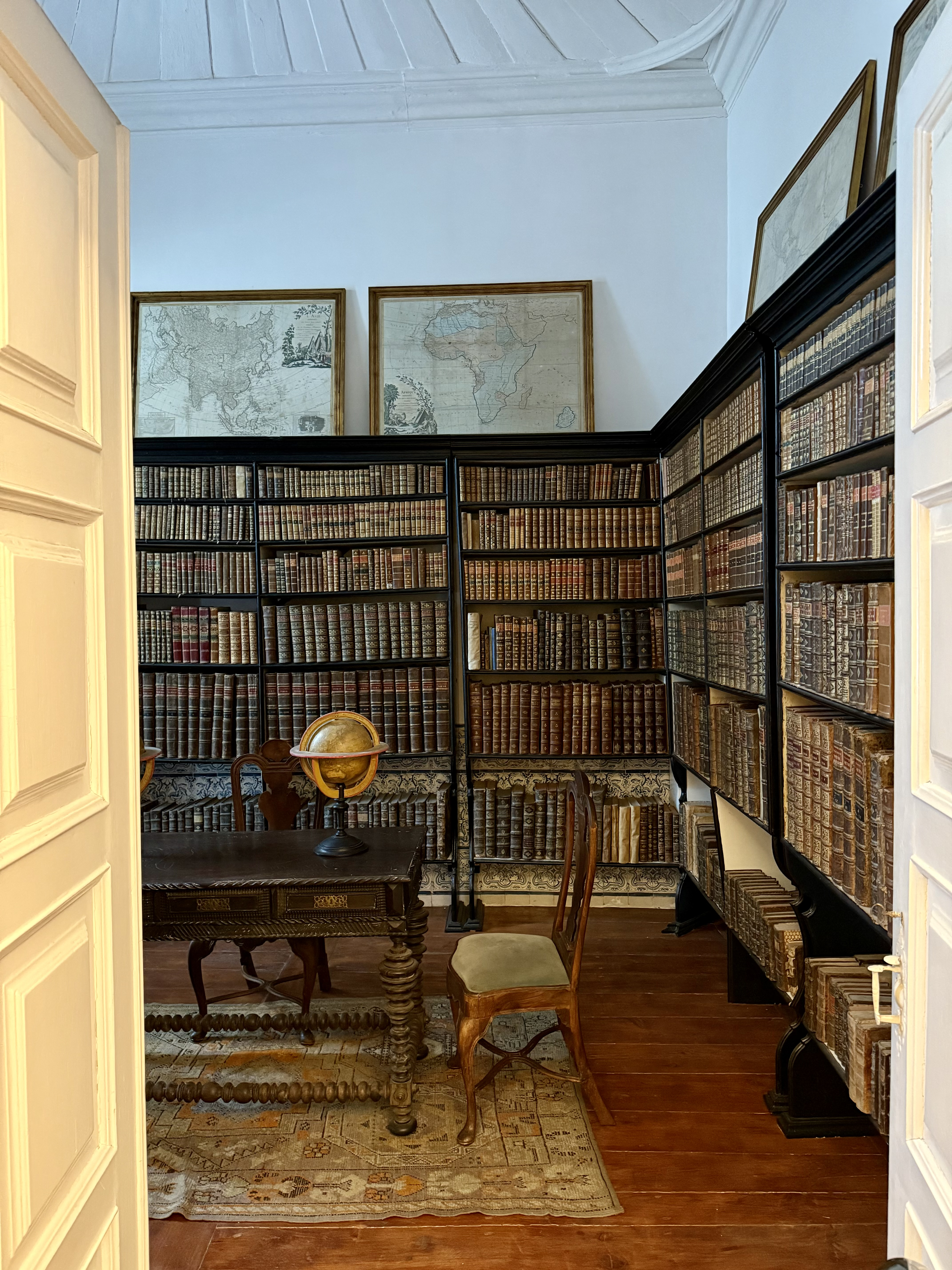
Library of the palace (August 2025)

In the context of the Portuguese Civil War, the 3rd Count of Anadia supported the Miguelist faction, and despite its defeat, his successors were later reinstated at Court as honorary senior officers of the Royal Household, taking their seats in the Chamber of the Distinguished Peers of the Kingdom. Under the law abolishing morgados and chapels (1863), the 4th Count of Anadia, José Maria de Sá Pereira e Menezes Pais do Amaral d’Almeida e Vasconcellos Quifel Barberino, became the last holder of the numerous morgadios that this house had accumulated over the centuries.

In September 1882, on the occasion of the inauguration of the Linha Beira Alta railway, the 5th Count of Anadia, Miguel de Sá Pais do Amaral, together with his brothers, José and Carlos, received King Dom Luís I and Queen Dona Maria Pia at the palace, where they were accommodated.

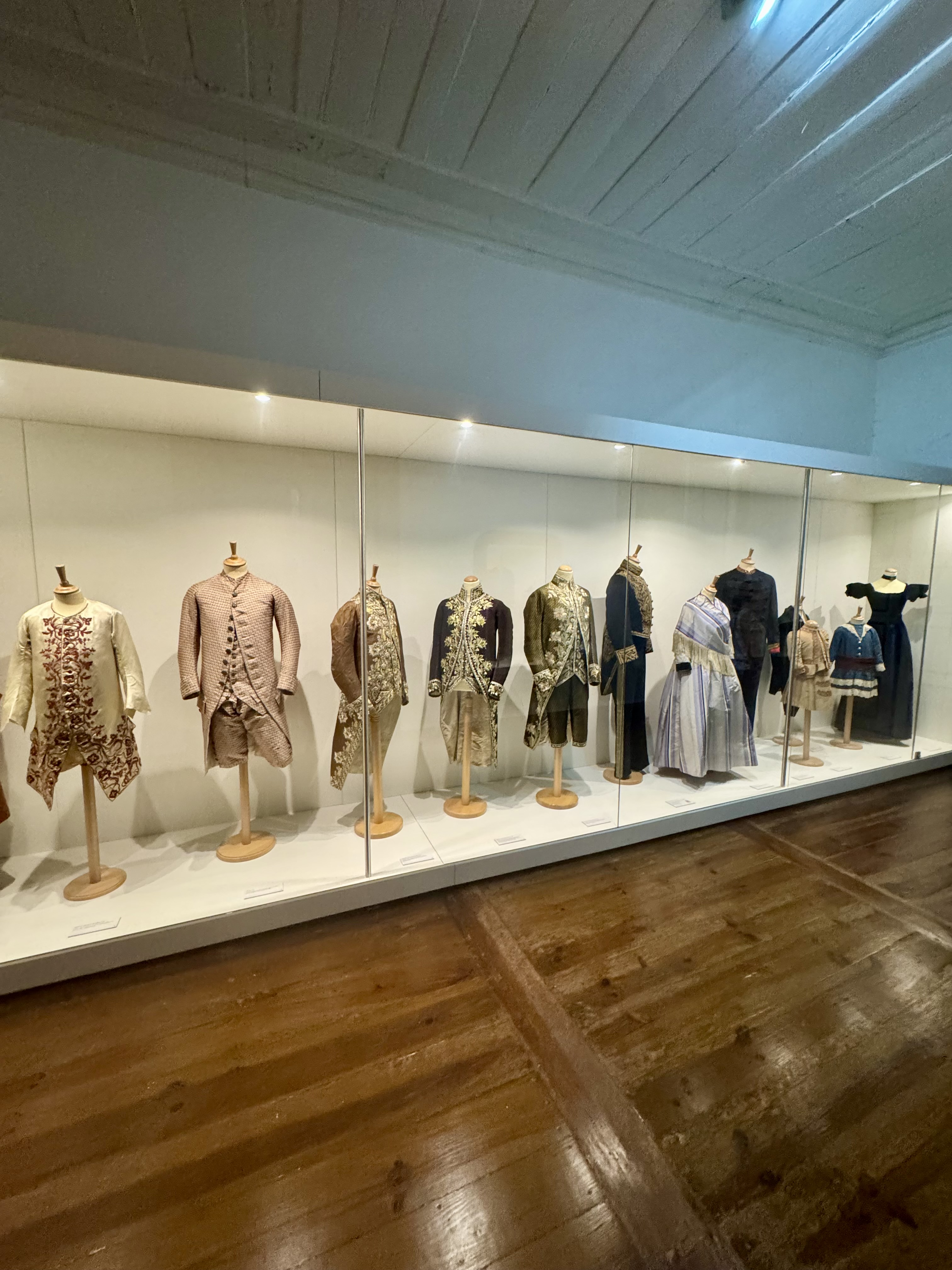
Costume exhibition in the palace (August 2025)

Later, in June 1896, during her stay at the São Pedro do Sul thermal baths, Queen Dona Amélie also visited the palace, accompanied by her two children, leaving a memento of her visit.

In 1901, towards the end of the monarchy, the two sons of the 5th Count of Anadia, José and Miguel, served as noble pages in the Royal Household during the oath-taking of Prince Royal Dom Luís Filipe as heir presumptive to the Portuguese Crown.

In 1978, the palace was classified as a Property of Public Interest. In 2014, this designation was revised to Ensemble of Public Interest, extending to the gardens, estate, and woodland under the name Palace of the Counts of Anadia. This new classification recognised the property for the Rococo civil architecture. It is considered a relevant manor in Beira Alta, with the surrounding grounds forming a coherent unit of landscape, architectural, and agricultural value, while maintaining a historical and urban connection with the city of Mangualde.

The Palace of the Counts of Anadia remains in the ownership of the same family. In the twentieth century, the 7th Count of Anadia, Manuel José Maria de Sá Paes do Amaral, together with his wife, Maria Mafalda de Figueiredo Cabral da Câmara, decided to open their residence to the public for appreciation.

== Architecture ==
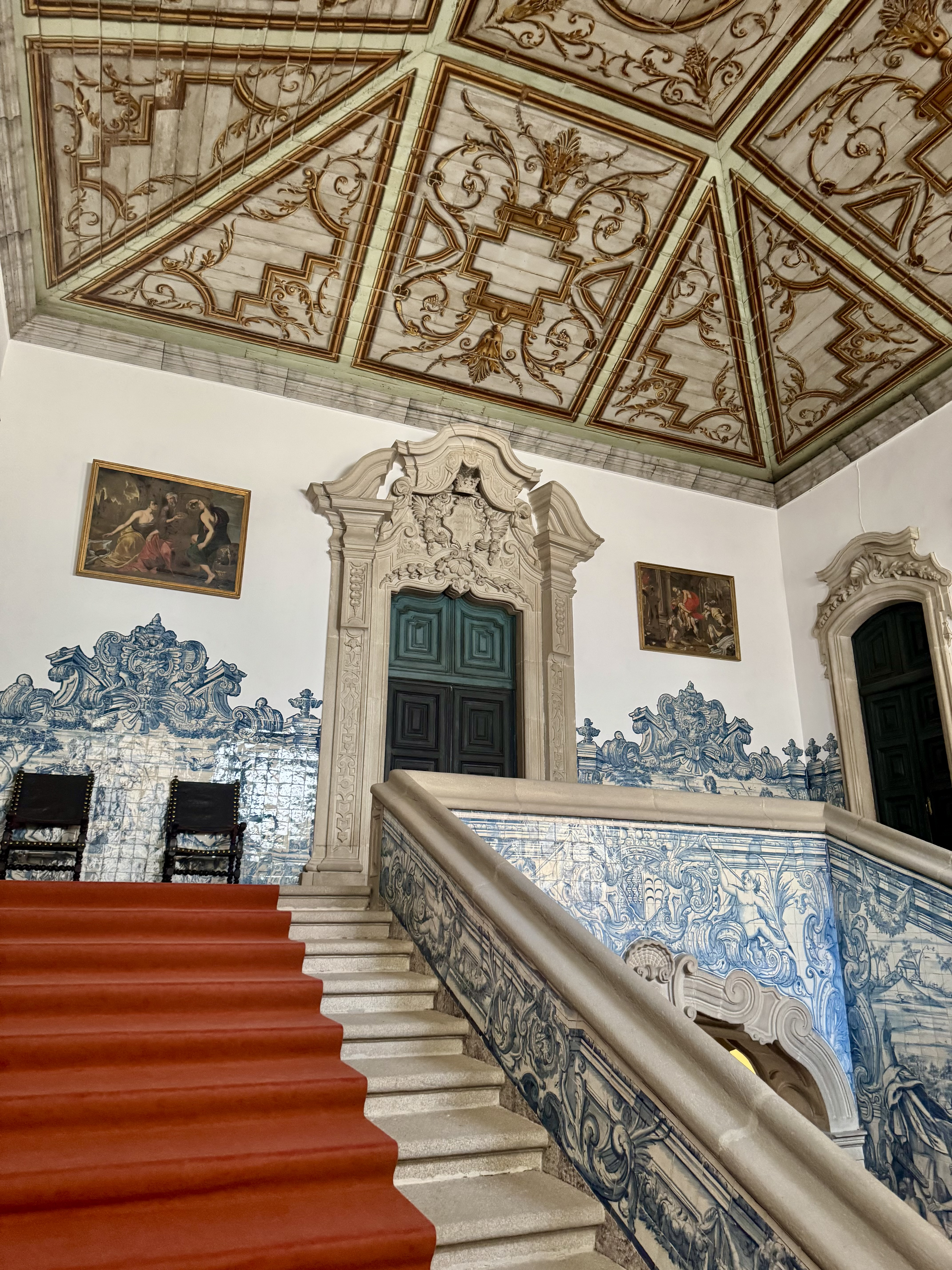
View of the palace's main staircase (August 2025)

The Palace of the Counts of Anadia comprises a manor house inspired by Nasonian models, with façades arranged in balanced, symmetrical compositions. The design is attributed to Gaspar Ferreira, the architect of the Joanina Library at the University of Coimbra, who also worked on the neighbouring Church of Misericórdia in Mangualde, completed in 1724. The chancel of this church, along with most of its construction, was funded by Simão Pais do Amaral, who at the same time was building his new residence nearby. It is therefore likely that the palace was designed by the Coimbran architect.

The entire complex was only completed in the early nineteenth century, with the successors of Simão Pais do Amaral continuing the completion of the construction.

Each façade is distinct, with particular emphasis on the main and south façades. The main façade, facing west, demonstrates the influence of Northern Portuguese houses in its central portal topped by an upper balcony. It extends horizontally, articulated by shallow pilasters framing sixteen windows, with particular attention to the noble floor, where the windows are more elaborately adorned with arched cornices and topped at the centre with shell motifs, anticipating the Rococo style. The symmetry of the front is focused on the central axis, marked by the portal surmounted by a coat of arms, flanked by pilasters that support an imposing balcony. At the northern end of this façade is the palace chapel.

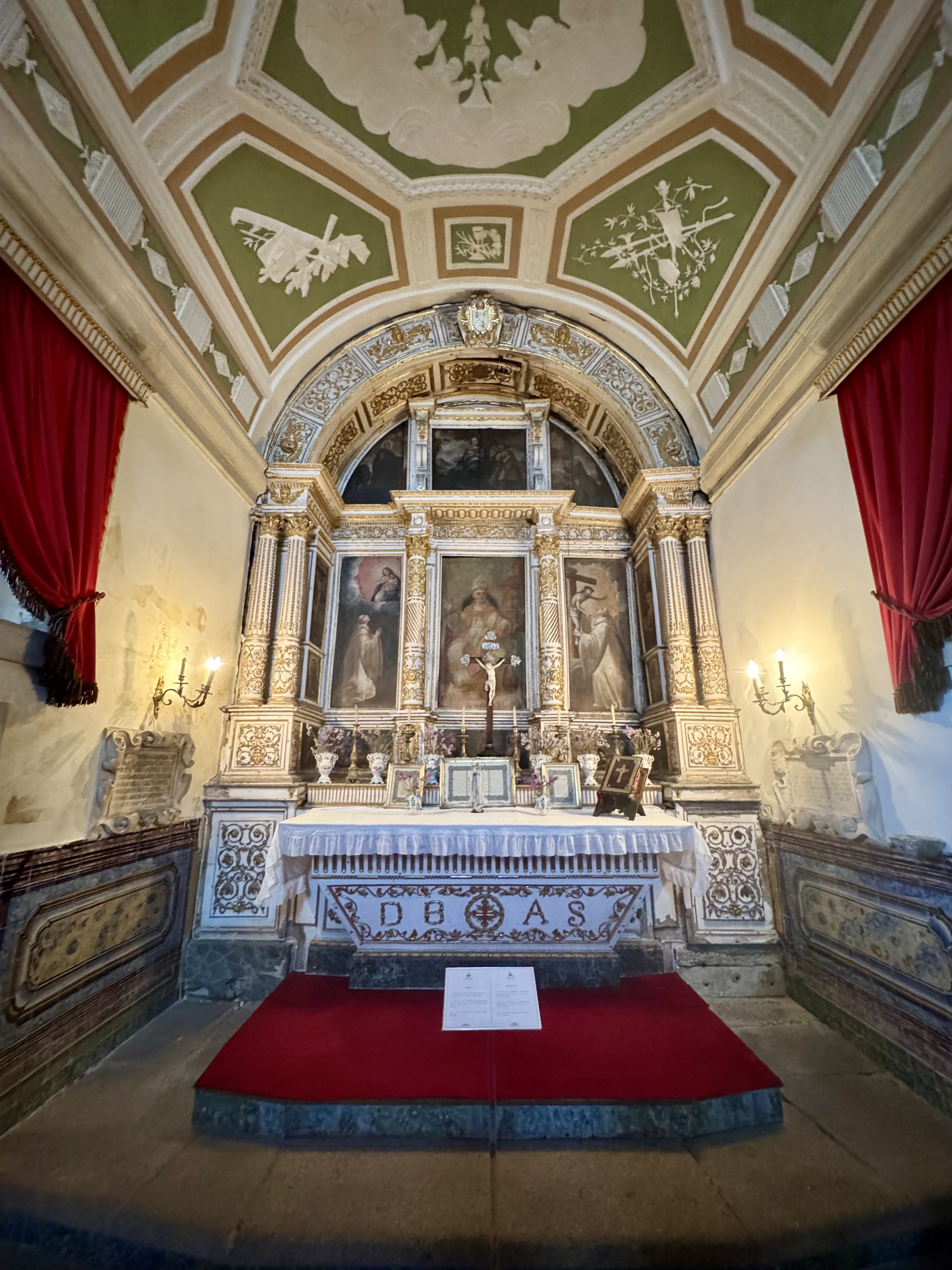
Palace chapel (August 2025)

The south façade is of particular note for its double semicircular staircase, attributed to António Mendes Coutinho, and for the loggia above it, comprising four lowered arches joined by a balustraded railing and finished with a painted wooden ceiling featuring Baroque motifs. This façade frames a courtyard enclosed by a wall with the entrance gate and a low range of estate buildings containing various service areas (stores, wine cellar, press, etc.).

The chapel of St Bernard, aligned with the main façade, features a portal with a pediment, a large window above, and a straight parapet finish. The chapel underwent successive interventions, including the restoration of the altarpiece in 1730 by the Porto carver Luís Pereira da Costa; modifications in 1790; and improvements and renovations between 1812 and 1819, during which the painting of St Bernard by Cirillo Volkmar Machado was commissioned to replace the earlier sculpted image. The last known intervention dates to the second decade of the nineteenth century, and it is possible that the architect José do Couto carried out work in 1824. The altarpiece remains original, and the stucco ceiling recalls the style of Luigi Chiari.

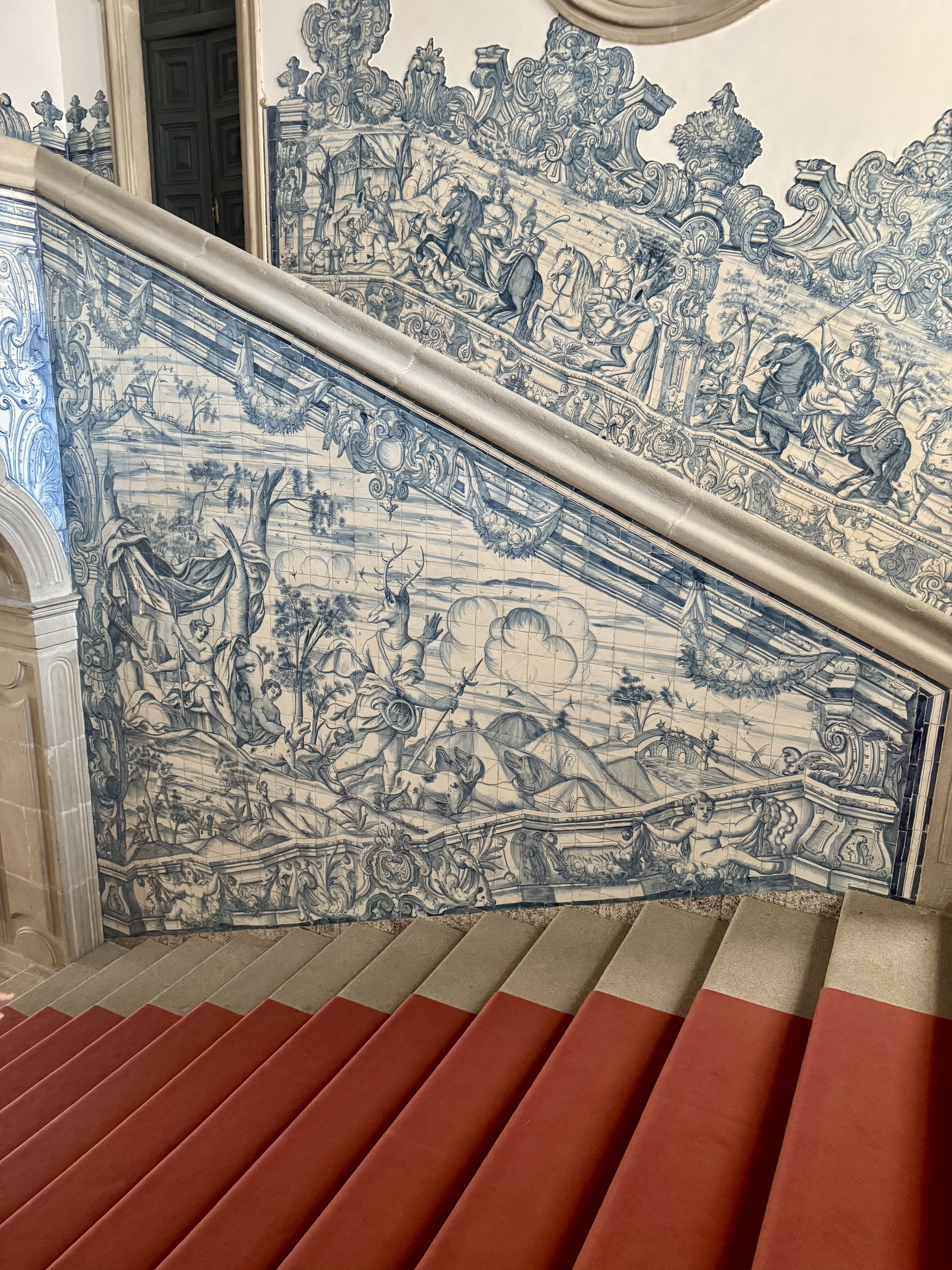
Tile mural on the palace's main staircase (August 2025)

=== Interiors ===
The interior of the Palace has a collection of tiles panels, dating from 1740.

In the atrium and grand staircase, the panels, executed by the Coimbra school, are attributed to Sousa Carvalho. Their iconography is derived from the work La Venaria Reale – Palazzo di Piacere e di Caccia, published in 1672, depicting mythological scenes that also reflect practices associated with the education of the nobility.

In the Noble Hall, also from 1740 and by the same artist, the panels symbolically represent the four known continents of the time: Europe, Africa, Asia, and America, as well as the four elements, depicted by Roman gods: Air – Juno; Water – Neptune; Fire – Vulcan; and Earth – Venus.

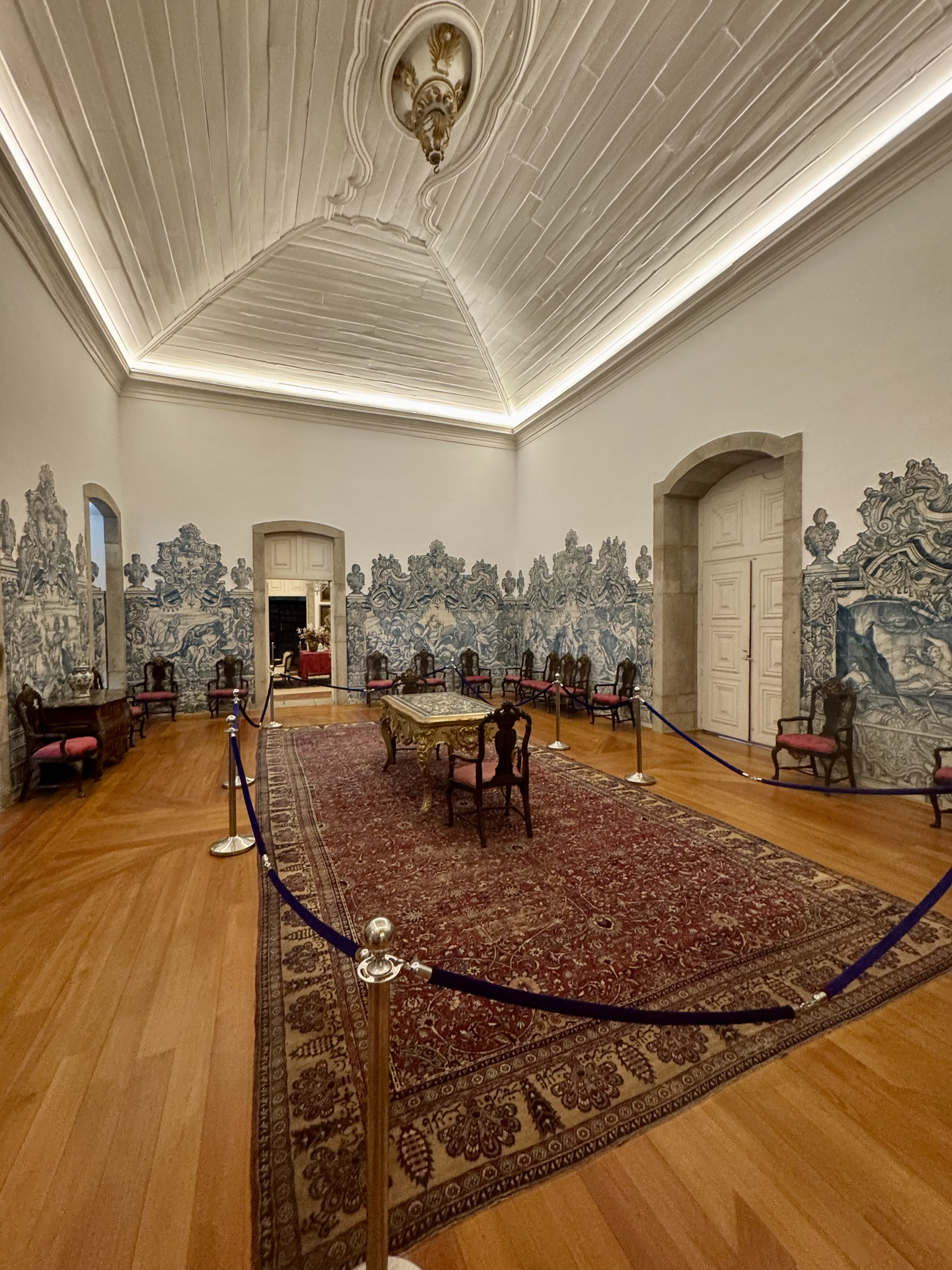
Palace's main hall (August 2025)

In the Ballroom, the tiles panels date from a later period, around 1770, also executed by the Coimbra school and attributed to Manuel da Silva, illustrating the theme of the "World Upside Down.”

The palace houses a collection of furniture, paintings, and prints, including the table in the Noble Hall, featuring a marble inlay top executed by Leoni in 1673, and the furniture of the Music Room adorned with chinoiserie motifs.

The sculpture collection includes an assemblage of eighteenth-century biscuit porcelain, representing statues uncovered in the excavations of Herculaneum and Pompeii. The palace's holdings extend to a collection of costumes and accessories dating from the eighteenth to the late nineteenth century.

== Gardens and woodland ==
Complementing the palace is an agricultural area, a Historic Garden, and a woodland, in the very centre of Mangualde. The estate is entirely walled, preserving its original structure in its entirety.

The gardens, vegetable plots, orchards, and Vineyards are integrated, while an extensive woodland, formerly home to deer, completes the ensemble.

The garden, situated apart from the house and linked by avenues and boxwood-lined paths, combines leisure and agricultural functions. Boxwood alleys define fields and plots, with the Serra da Estrela providing a natural backdrop to the property.

The woodland, laid out in the eighteenth century, includes a variety of tree species, particularly ancient oaks. It features an obelisk commissioned after the Peninsular War, as well as a lake, a pala field, a pet cemetery, and a small hermitage known as the Convent of the Friars.

== Notes ==
- This article was originally translated, in whole or in part, from the Portuguese Wikipedia article titled "Palácio dos Condes de Anadia".

== Bibliography ==
- Almeida, José António Ferreira de (1976), Artistic Treasures of Portugal, Lisbon, Reader's Digest;
- Alves, Alexandre (1972), "The Palace of the Paes de Amaral, Counts of Anadia, in Mangualde," Beira Alta, vol. XXXI, pp. 77–88;
- Alves, Alexandre (2001), Artists and Artisans in the Dioceses of Lamego and Viseu, Viseu, Civil Government of Viseu;
- Anacleto, Regina (2002), "The Architect José do Couto and the Parish Churches of Midões and Nogueira do Cravo," Beira Alta, vols. LXI (1 and 2), pp. 185–219;
- Araújo, Ilídio de (1962), Landscape Art and the Art of Gardens in Portugal, Lisbon, General Directorate of Urbanization Services;
- Binney, Marcus (1987), Noble Houses of Portugal, Lisbon, Difel;
- Carita, Hélder (1998), Treatise on the Grandeur of Gardens in Portugal, Lisbon, Bertrand Editora / Quetzal Editores;
- Carita, Hélder (2016), The Manor House in Portugal – Models, Typologies, Interior Layouts, and Furnishings, Lisbon, APCA;
- Carita, Hélder and Homem Cardoso (1983), East and West in Portuguese Interiors, Porto, Livraria Civilização Editora;
- Gil, Júlio (2005), The Most Beautiful Palaces of Portugal, Lisbon, Editorial Verbo / Edimpresa Editora Lda.
- Pimentel, António Filipe (1996), "Manuel da Silva and the Spread of the Baroque in the Beiras," Proceedings of the VI Luso-Spanish Symposium of Art History, pp. 427–455;
- Santos, Diana Gonçalves dos (2017), "Solar dos Paes do Amaral," Tiles – Wonders of Portugal, Centro Atlântico;
- Silva Valentim da (1945), Municipality of Mangualde (Former Municipality of Azurara da Beira): A Contribution to the History of Portugal, Porto, Alves.
