= Nombre de Dios =

Nombre de Dios (Spanish, "Name of God") may refer to:

- Nombre de Dios, Colón, town in Panama
- Nombre de Dios, Durango, city in Mexico
- Nombre de Dios Municipality, municipality in Mexico whose seat is Nombre de Dios
- Nombre de Dios (mission), mission in Florida
- Nombre de Dios River, river in Panama
- Nombre de Dios Grottoes, cave in Mexico
- Cordillera Nombre de Dios, mountain range and natural preserve in Atlántida Department, Honduras
