= San Bernardino (disambiguation) =

San Bernardino is a large city in Southern California.

San Bernardino may also refer to:

== Churches ==
=== Italy ===
- San Bernardino alle Ossa, Milan
- San Bernardino (Verona), Verona
- San Bernardino, Rimini
- San Bernardino, Urbino, Urbino
- San Bernardino da Siena, Carpi
- San Bernardino Realino, Carpi
- Basilica of San Bernardino, L'Aquila
- San Bernardino in Panisperna, Rome
- San Bernardino, Asciano, Siena
- Oratory of San Bernardino, Siena

=== Mexico ===
- San Bernardino de Siena Church, Xochimilco

== Landforms ==
=== United States ===
- San Bernardino Valley (Arizona)
- San Bernardino Valley, California
- San Bernardino Mountains, California
- Little San Bernardino Mountains, California
- San Bernardino National Forest, California
- San Gorgonio Pass, California, sometimes referenced as the San Bernardino Pass

=== Elsewhere ===
- San Bernardino Pass, a high mountain pass in the Swiss Alps
- San Bernardino River, Sonora, Mexico
- San Bernardino Strait, the Philippines
- San Bernardino (torrent), a torrent that flows through the Italian province of Verbano-Cusio-Ossola

== People ==
- Bernardino of Siena (1380–1444), Italian priest, Franciscan missionary, and Catholic saint

== Places ==
=== Mexico ===
- San Bernardino Contla, two nearby villages in Tlaxcala, Mexico
- San Bernardino, Chihuahua
- San Bernardino, Texcoco, State of Mexico
- San Bernardino, Oaxaca
- San Bernardino Lagunas, Puebla
- San Bernardino, Sonora
- San Bernardino, Yucatán

=== Switzerland ===
- San Bernardino, Switzerland
- San Bernardino Pass, between Thusis and Bellinzona

=== United States ===
- San Bernardino, California
- San Bernardino County, California

=== Elsewhere ===
- San Bernardino, Suchitepéquez, Guatemala
- San Bernardino, Paraguay
- San Bernardino District, San Pablo, Peru
- San Bernardino, Libertador, Caracas, Venezuela, a parish

== Transportation ==
- San Bernardino (Amtrak station), a passenger rail station in San Bernardino, California
- San Bernardino Transit Center, a passenger rail station and bus terminal in San Bernardino, California
- San Bernardino Freeway, designation for Interstate 10 connecting San Bernardino with Los Angeles
- San Bernardino International Airport, a public airport in San Bernardino, California
- San Bernardino Tunnel, on the A13 motorway in Switzerland

== Other uses ==
- San Bernardino Valley College, a community college in San Bernardino, California
- California State University, San Bernardino
- San Bernardino de Sena Estancia, a ranch outpost of Mission San Gabriel Arcángel in Redlands, California
- San Bernardino Ranch, a historic ranch in the southern San Bernardino Valley
- San Bernardino meridian, one of three principal meridians in the state of California
- USS San Bernardino, two United States Navy ships

== See also ==
- "San Ber'dino" (song), by Frank Zappa and the Mothers of Invention
- "San Bernadino" (song), by Christie
- Saint Bernard (disambiguation)
- San Bernardo (disambiguation)
