= Saucillo =

City in the Mexican state of Chihuahua

- City
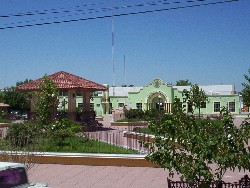
- Main Square and City Hall

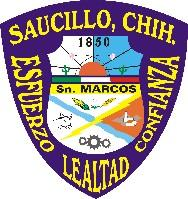
- Coat of arms

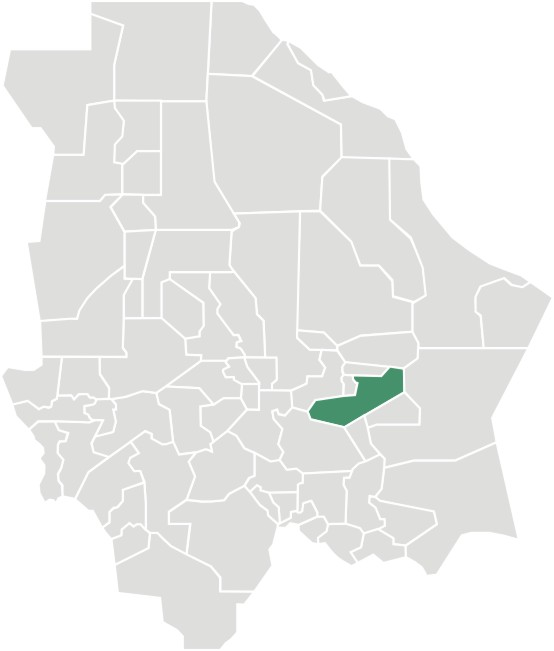
- Municipality of Saucillo in Chihuahua

- Location in Mexico
- Coordinates: 28°02′N 105°17′W
- Country: Mexico
- State: Chihuahua
- Municipality: Saucillo
- Settled: 1870
- Town status: 19 October 1907
- City status: 13 July 1950
- Postal code: 33620
- Area code: 621

Saucillo is a city in the Mexican state of Chihuahua. It serves as the municipal seat of the surrounding municipality of Saucillo.

As of 2010, the city of Saucillo had a population of 11,004, up from 9,261 as of 2005.

== See also ==
- San Bernardino, Chihuahua
