= Nombre de Dios Grottoes =

Cave system in the state of Chihuahua, Mexico

- Grutas Nombre de Dios
- Interactive map of Nombre de Dios Grottoes
- Location: Sierra de Nombre de Dios, Chihuahua, Mexico
- Coordinates: 28°42′33″N 106°4′37″W
- Depth: 85 m (279 ft)
- Length: 1,490 m (4,890 ft)
- Discovery: Sixteenth century
- Geology: Limestone
- Access: Public
- Cave survey: Autonomous University of Chihuahua

Nombre de Dios Grottoes (Spanish: Grutas de Nombre de Dios) is a cave system in the state of Chihuahua, Mexico. The main entrance of the cavern is located in the middle of the Cerro del Caballo of the Sierra de Nombre de Dios, approximately 200 m (660 ft)) from the Sacramento River, northeast of the state capital Chihuahua City. This elaborate cave system came to official attention during the sixteenth century. The location might have previously been used for ceremonial purposes by Apache, Comanche and others of the many local indigenous people.

== Cave structure ==
The site has been made accessible to the public. A secure trail has been made, that includes ramps and stairs and extends to almost 1,490 m (4,890 ft)) in length and descends to a depth of around 82 m (269 ft). Temperatures inside the caverns generally range from 27 to 33 °C (81 to 91 °F; 300 to 306 K) with a relative humidity of 30–70%. A few tiny rivulets that drain mineralized water can be found. The site consists of 12 to 17 sizeable chambers and numerous small floors and galleries, primarily made of limestone. Other minerals, such as aragonite and gypsum, can be found in smaller quantities. Deposits containing sulfates (SO_{4}^{2–}) and other mineral impurities (Zn^{2+}, Fe^{3+}) have accumulated on the walls. Over the course of 5 million years, extended periods of water seepage have caused the formation of countless and often very illustrious speleotherms (stalagmites and stalactites). Some are bizarrely recognizable and as in many other places, these have been popularly named, like La Torre de Pisa (Leaning Tower of Pisa) and El Quixote, a stalagmite shape that resembles the side view portrait of Miguel de Cervantes' famous novel character Don Quixote.

Other notable deposit structures, that are open to the public include La Cocina (the Kitchen) – a cavern with formations, that have striking similarities to that of certain kinds of food. The walls are, among others, shaped like popcorn and dripping beer foam, a large stalagmite of almost 4 m (13 ft) height is shaped like an asparagus, and another, 1 m (3.3 ft) in height, resembles a chicken leg. A massive stalagmite nearly 3 m (9.8 ft) high, is called El Castillo (the Castle) with a curious side protrusion in the shape of a dragon's head.

== History ==
The limestone of the Nombre de Dios Grottoes formed approximately 160 million years ago, during the Late Jurassic when the region of modern Chihuahua represented the sea floor of the Tethys Ocean. After the sea had slowly shifted and retreated, erosion played a defining factor in the formation of the huge caverns.

The caverns were named in the sixteenth century, probably after the city of Chihuahua's Nombre de Dios suburb alongside San Juan Bautista del Norte, established by the Basque adventurer and later governor Francisco de Ibarra during one of his expeditions north of the Mexican state of Zacatecas.

Another source claims that the name 'Nombre de Dios' relates to a group of Franciscans, who had travelled and survived a journey to what is now the city of Chihuahua, thanking God when they reached the settlement.

The caverns were exploited by the Gambusinos – untrained mineral seekers and small-scale miners, who extracted silver and other precious minerals, though of the poorest quality, from the nineteenth century to the beginning of the twentieth century. Prior to the official launch of the Nombre de Dios Grottoes Project at the end of the twentieth century, two groups of people were trapped due to poor preparations and died while attempting to explore the caves.

Since 1996 professor Manuel Reyes of the Faculty of Engineering of the Autonomous University of Chihuahua made several visits to explore the chambers and do preliminary studies in order to prepare the caverns for public access, which he completed on 5 July 1999. Organizations involved in the development of the project were the state government, the city hall, and the Autonomous University of Chihuahua. On 25 October 2000, the Nombre de Dios Grottoes were opened to the public, welcoming over 3,000 visitors. The day of the inauguration was promoted via the local media on television, radio and in newspapers.

== See also ==
- Cave of the Crystals – Mexican cave renowned for its giant crystals
- Naica Mine – Mexican mine renowned for its giant gypsum crystals
