= Selenite (gypsum) =

Transparent variety of gypsum

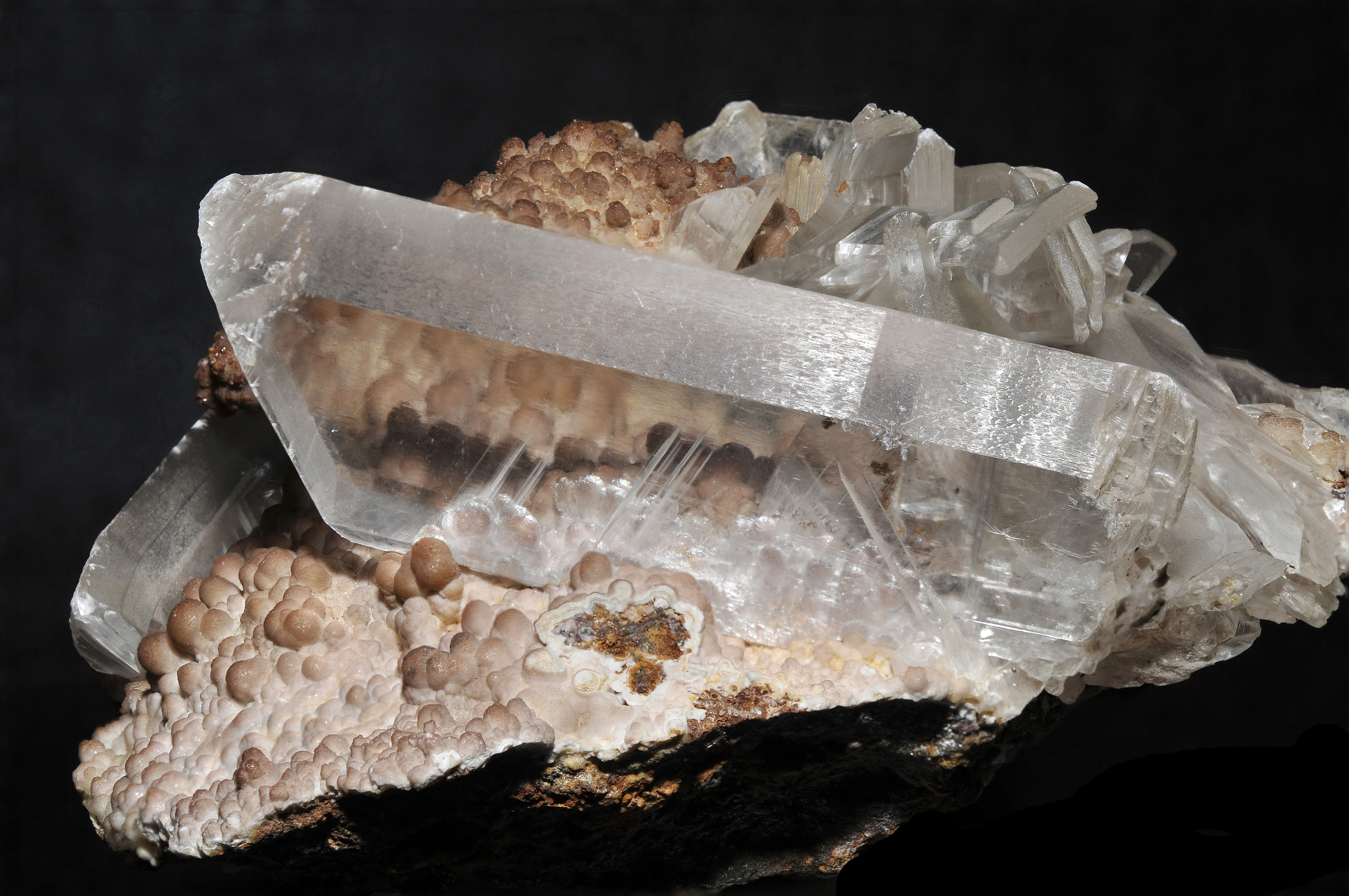

General
- Category: Sulfate mineral
- Formula: CaSO_{4}·2H_{2}O
- Crystal system: Monoclinic (2/m) Space group: A2/a

Identification
- Formula mass: 172.17
- Color: Colorless, often tinted due to inclusions Satin spar gypsum: white
- Crystal habit: Platy; Satin spar gypsum: fibrous
- Cleavage: [010] Perfect, [100] Distinct, [011] Distinct
- Fracture: Micaceous; Satin spar gypsum: fibrous
- Mohs scale hardness: 2
- Luster: Vitreous; Satin spar gypsum: pearly
- Streak: White
- Diaphaneity: Transparent; Satin spar gypsum: translucent to opaque
- Specific gravity: 2.9
- Optical properties: Biaxial (+) 2V=58
- Refractive index: nα = 1.519–1.521, nβ = 1.522–1.523, nγ = 1.529–1.53
- Birefringence: δ = 0.0090–0.0100
- Other characteristics: Fluorescent

Selenite is a mostly clear, transparent variety of the sulfate mineral gypsum.

The name selenite is also commonly used for other varieties of gypsum, including satin spar gypsum, desert roses, and gypsum flowers.

All varieties of gypsum, including selenite, satin spar, and alabaster, are composed of calcium sulfate dihydrate (meaning that it has two molecules of water), with the chemical formula CaSO_{4}·2H_{2}O. Selenite contains no selenium; the similar names both derive from Greek selḗnē (σελήνη 'Moon').

Some of the largest crystals ever found are of selenite, the largest specimen found in the Naica Mine's Cave of the Crystals being 12 meters long and weighing 12 tons.

== History and etymology ==
"Selenite" is mostly synonymous with gypsum, but from the 15th century, it has named the transparent variety that occurs in crystals or crystalline masses. The name derives through Middle English selenite from Latin selenites, ultimately from Greek selēnítēs líthos (σεληνίτης λίθος, lit. 'moon stone'). It got this name because people historically believed the mineral waxed and waned with the cycles of the Moon.

== Distinguishing characteristics ==
The main distinguishing characteristics of crystalline gypsum are its softness (hardness 2 on Mohs scale, soft enough to scratch with a fingernail) and its three unequal cleavages. Other distinguishing characteristics include its crystal habits, pearly lustre, easy fusibility with loss of water, and solubility in hot dilute hydrochloric acid.

== Varieties ==
Though sometimes grouped together as "selenite", the four crystalline varieties have differences. General identifying descriptions of the related crystalline varieties are:

=== Selenite ===
- Selenite is most often transparent and colorless.
- If selenite crystals show opacity or color, these are caused by the presence of other minerals, sometimes in druse.

=== Satin spar ===
- Most often silky and fibrous; chatoyant; can exhibit some coloration
- The satin spar name has also been applied to fibrous calcite (a related calcium mineral), which can be distinguished from gypsum by its greater hardness (Mohs 3), rhombohedral cleavage, and reaction with dilute hydrochloric acid.

=== Desert rose ===
- Rosette-shaped gypsum with outer druse of sand or with sand throughout – most often sand colored (in all the colors that sand can exhibit)
- The desert rose name can also be applied to barite desert roses (another related sulfate mineral) – barite is a harder mineral with higher density

=== Gypsum flower ===
- Gypsum flowers are curved rosettes of fibrous gypsum crystals found in solution caves.

== Use and history ==
Satin spar is sometimes cut into cabochons to best display its chatoyance.

== Crystal habit and properties ==
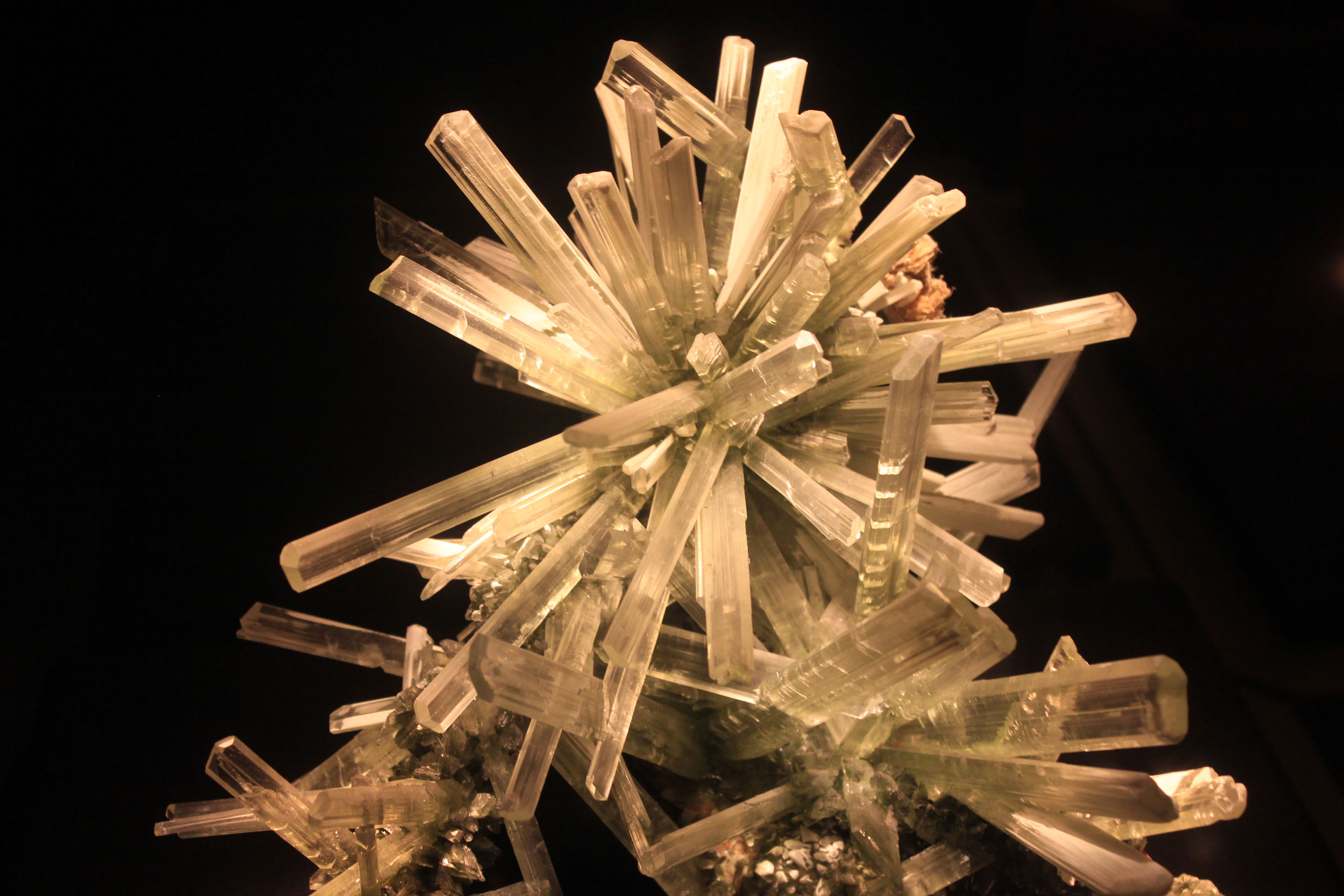
Columnar crystal habit

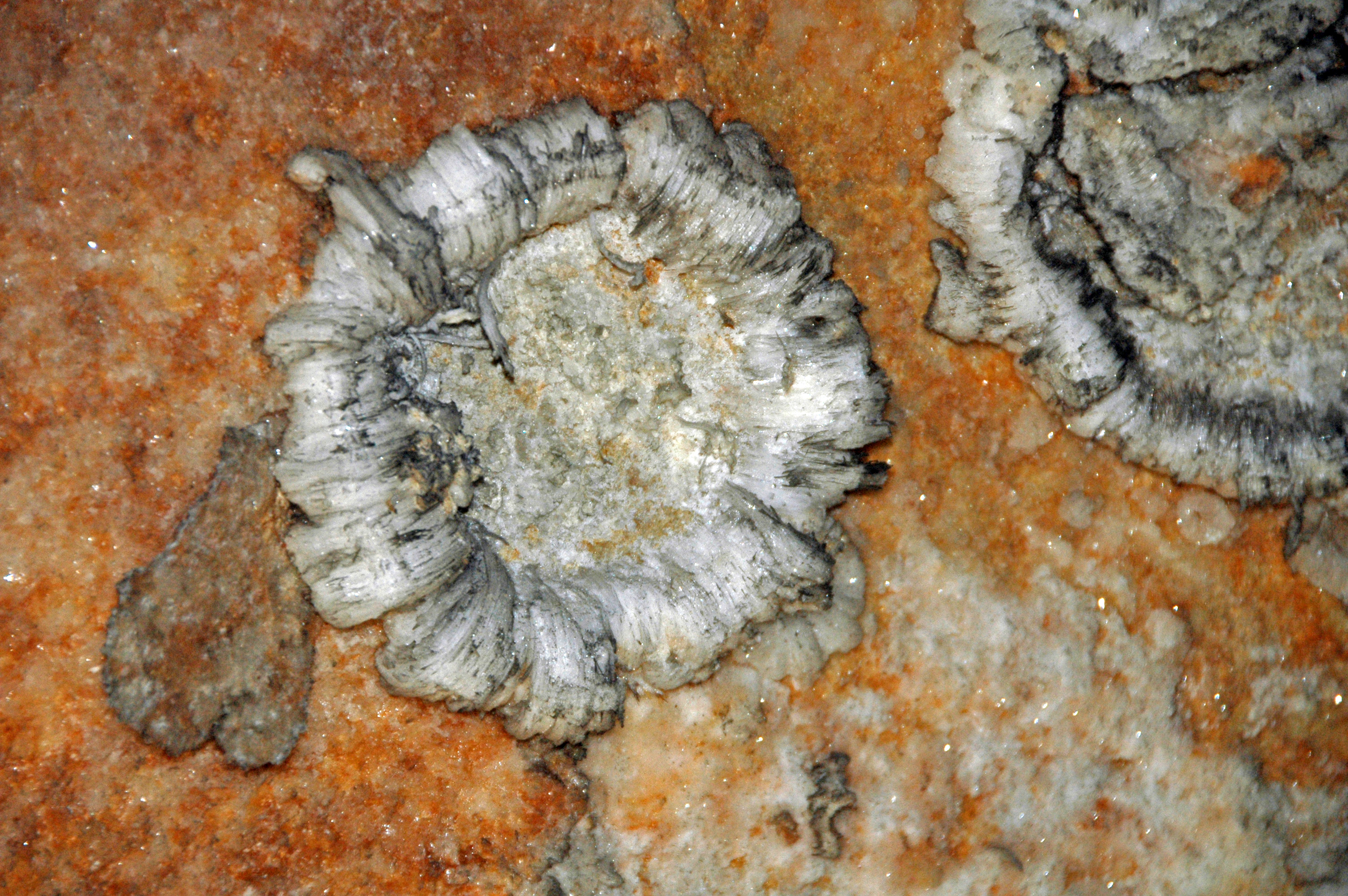
"Gypsum flower" speleothem, Mammoth Cave National Park, Kentucky. Orange color is iron oxide from groundwater.

Crystal habit refers to the shapes that crystals exhibit. Selenite crystals show a variety of habits, but the most common are tabular, prismatic, or acicular (columnar) crystals, often with no imperfections or inclusions. Twinned crystals are common, and often take the form of "swallow tail" twins.

Selenite crystals sometimes form in thin tabular or mica-like sheets and have been used as window panes as at Santa Sabina in Rome.

Selenite crystals sometimes will also exhibit bladed rosette habit (usually transparent and like desert roses) often with accompanying transparent, columnar crystals. Selenite crystals can be found both attached to a matrix or base rock, but can commonly be found as entire free-floating crystals, often in clay beds (and as can desert roses).

Satin spar is almost always prismatic and fibrous in a parallel crystal habit. Satin spar often occurs in seams, some of them quite long, and is often attached to a matrix or base rock.

Desert roses are most often bladed, exhibiting the familiar shape of a rose, and almost always have an exterior druse. Desert roses form in wet sand, unattached to a matrix or base rock.

Gypsum flowers are most often acicular, scaly, stellate, and lenticular. Gypsum flowers most often exhibit simple twinning (known as contact twins); where parallel, long, needle-like crystals, sometimes having severe curves and bends, will frequently form “ram’s horns”, "fishtail", "arrow/spear-head", and "swallowtail" twins. Selenite crystals can also exhibit “arrow/spear-head” as well as “duck-bill” twins. Both selenite crystals and gypsum flowers sometimes form quite densely in acicular mats or nets; and can be quite brittle and fragile. Gypsum flowers are usually attached to a matrix (can be gypsum) or base rock.

=== Color ===
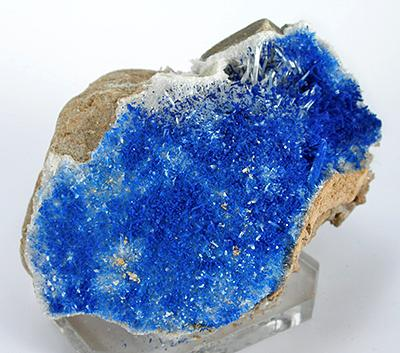
Azurite-gypsum "Buda Rock", Ray Mine Arizona. A core of glassy and colorless gypsum crystals up to 1 cm in length with a druse of royal blue azurite, to 0.5 cm in length on the smaller gypsum crystals and included within the larger ones.

Gypsum crystals are colorless (most often selenite), white (or pearly – most often satin spar), or gray, but may be tinted brown, yellow, red, or blue by the presence of impurities, such as iron oxides or clay minerals.

=== Transparency ===
Gypsum crystals can be transparent (most often selenite), translucent (most often satin spar but also selenite and gypsum flowers), and opaque (most often the rosettes and flowers). Opacity can be caused by impurities, inclusions, druse, and crust, and can occur in all four crystalline varieties.

=== Luster ===
Selenite typically shows vitreous luster, but may show pearly luster on cleavage surfaces. Satin spar shows characteristic silky luster. Luster is not often exhibited in the rosettes, due to their exterior druse; nevertheless, the rosettes often show glassy to pearly luster on edges. Gypsum flowers usually exhibit more luster than desert roses.

=== Other optical properties ===
Fibrous satin spar exhibits chatoyancy (cat's eye effect).

When cut across the fibers and polished on the ends, satin spar exhibits an optical illusion when placed on a printed or pictured surface: print and pictures appear to be on the surface of the sample. It is often called and sold as the “television stone” (as is ulexite).

Some selenite and satin spar specimens exhibit fluorescence or phosphorescence.

=== Tenacity ===
All four crystalline varieties are slightly flexible, though will break if bent significantly. They are not elastic, meaning they can be bent, but will not bend back on their own.

All four crystalline varieties are sectile in that they can be easily cut, will peel (particularly selenite crystals that exhibit mica-like properties), and like all gypsum varieties, can be scratched by a fingernail (hardness: 2 on Mohs Scale). The rosettes are not quite as soft due to their exterior druse; nevertheless, they too can be scratched.

Selenite crystals that exhibit in either reticular or acicular habits, satin spar, in general (as fibrous crystals are thin and narrow), desert roses that are thinly bladed, and gypsum flowers, particularly acicular gypsum flowers, can be quite brittle and easily broken.

=== Size ===
All four crystalline varieties can range in size from minute to giant selenite crystals measuring 11 meters long such as those found in the caves of the Naica Mine of Chihuahua, Mexico. The crystals thrived in the cave's extremely rare and stable natural environment. Temperatures stayed at 58 °C, and the cave was filled with mineral-rich water that drove the crystals' growth. The largest of those crystals weighs 55 tons, is 11 meters (36 ft) long, and is over 500,000 years old.

== Occurrence ==
Gypsum occurs on every continent and is the most common of all the sulfate minerals.

Gypsum is formed as an evaporative mineral, frequently found in alkaline lake muds, clay beds, evaporated seas, salt flats, salt springs, and caves. It is frequently found in conjunction with other minerals such as, copper ores, sulfur and sulfides, silver, iron ores, coal, calcite, dolomite, limestone, and opal. Gypsum has been dated to almost every geologic age since the Silurian Period which started 443.1 million years ago.

In dry, desert conditions and arid areas, sand may become trapped both on the inside and the outside of gypsum crystals as they form. Interior inclusion of sand can take on shapes such as an interior hourglass shape common to selenite crystals of the ancient Great Salt Plains Lake bed, Oklahoma, US. Exterior inclusion (druse) occurs as embedded sand grains on the surface such as, commonly seen in the familiar desert rose.

When gypsum dehydrates severely, anhydrite is formed. If water is reintroduced, gypsum can and will reform – including as the four crystalline varieties. An example of gypsum crystals reforming in modern times is found at Philips Copper Mine (closed and abandoned), Putnam County, New York, US where selenite micro crystal coatings are commonly found on numerous surfaces (rock and otherwise) in the cave and in the dump.

== Images ==
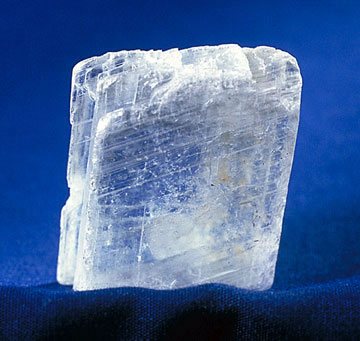
Selenite, a gypsum crystal

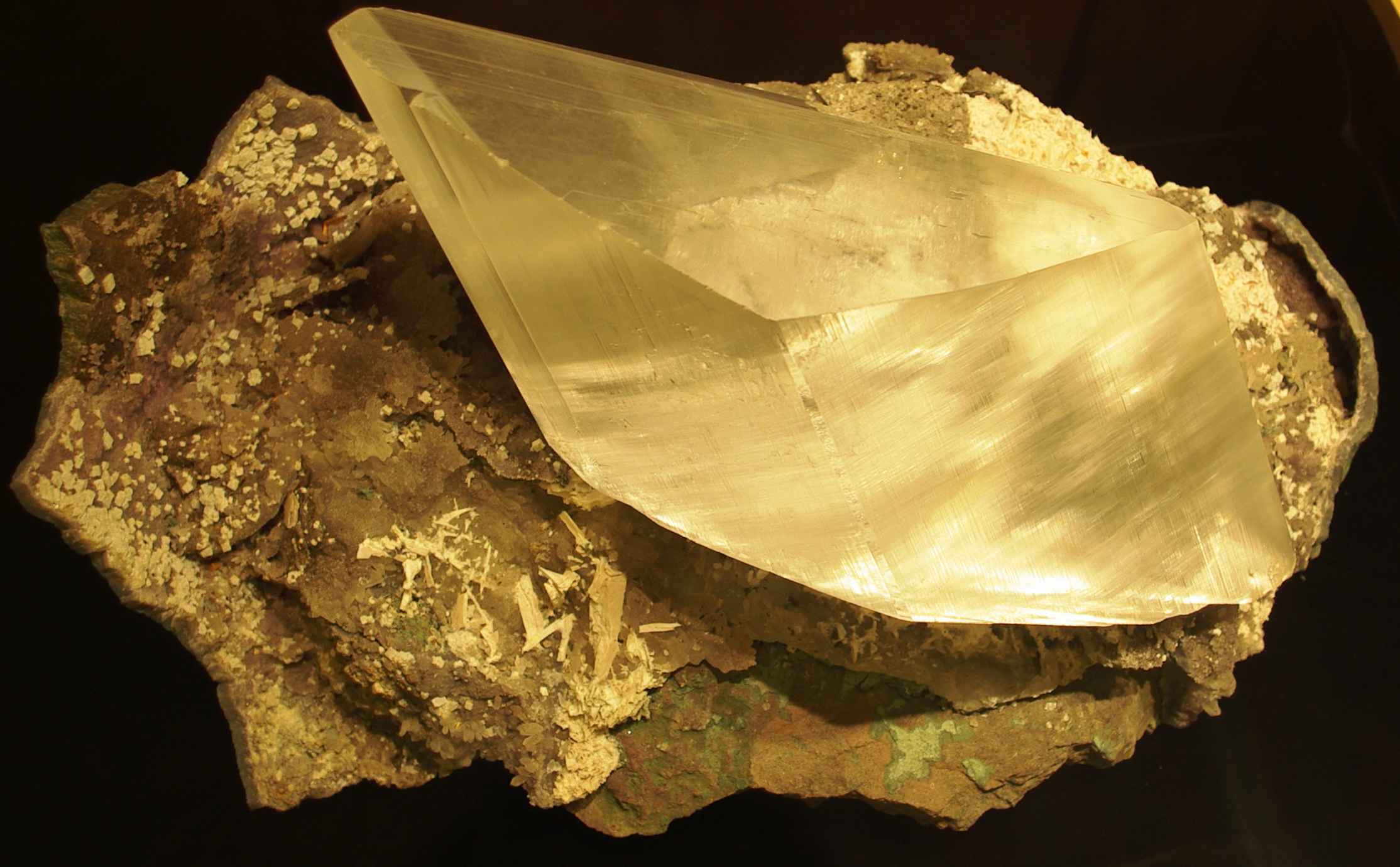
Selenite from Rio Grande Do Sul, Brazil on display at the Rice Northwest Museum of Rocks and Minerals in Hillsboro, Oregon, USA.

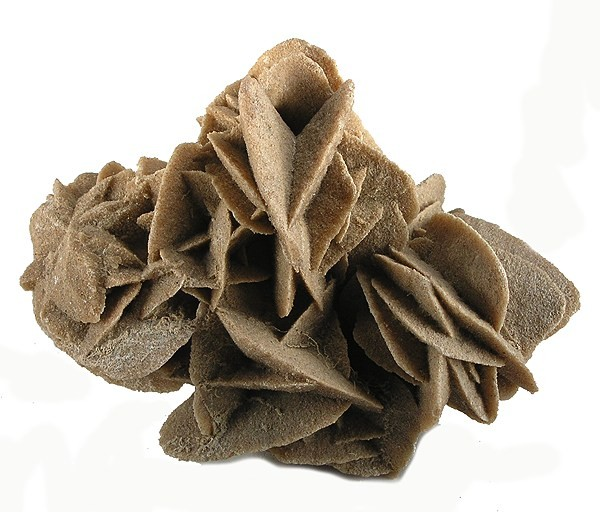
Desert rose. Cluster of sharp, bladed selenite crystals

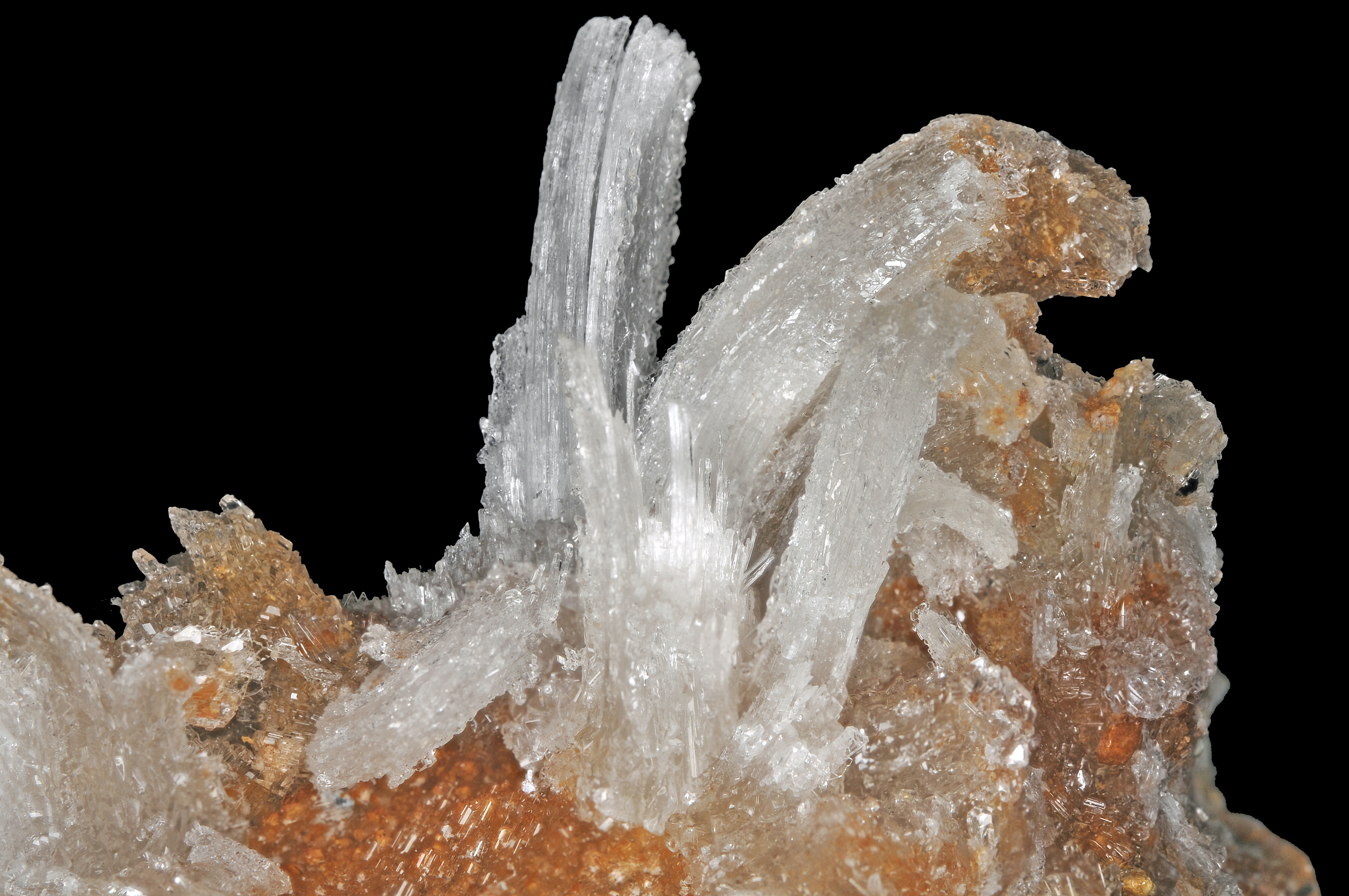
Gypsum flowers, Bou Azer East deposit, Bou Azer District, Tazenakht, Ouarzazate Province, Souss-Massa-Draâ Region, Morocco

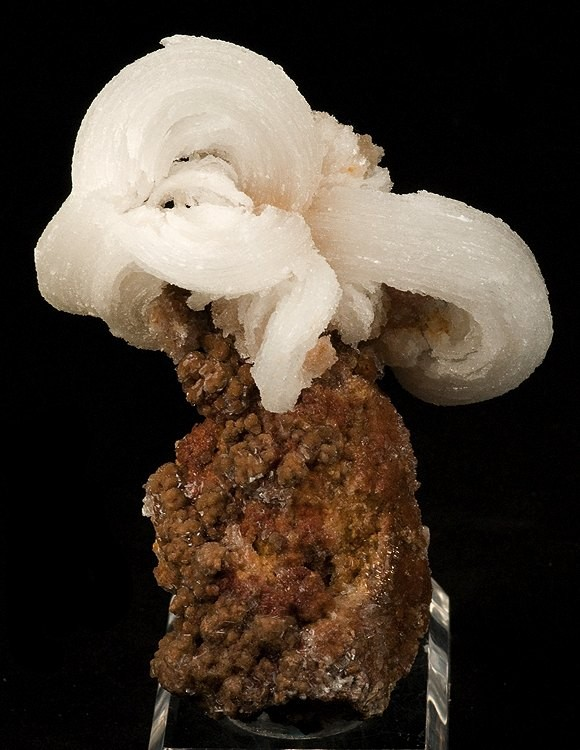
Stereotypic cluster for "ram’s-horns" selenite

== See also ==
- Great Salt Plains Lake and Great Salt Plains National Wildlife Refuge, Oklahoma, USA
- Lake Lucero, White Sands National Park, New Mexico, USA
- Lechuguilla Cave, Carlsbad Caverns National Park, New Mexico, USA
- Peñoles Mine, Naica, Chihuahua, Mexico
