= Saint Bernard =

Saint Bernard refers primarily to Bernard of Clairvaux (1090–1153), a Christian saint, mystic, and reformer of the Cistercian order.

Another prominent meaning is St. Bernard (dog), a breed of dog.

St. or St Bernard may also refer to:

== People ==
- Bernard degli Uberti (d. 1133), Catholic saint, Italian abbot, bishop, papal legate, and cardinal
- Bernard of Corleone (1605–1667), Sicilian friar, Franciscan Blessed
- Bernard of Menthon (c. 1020–1081 or 1086), Catholic saint, founder of the hostel at Great St Bernard Pass, and namesake of the famous dog breed
- Bernard of Thiron (1046–1117), Catholic saint, French founder of the Tironensian Order
- Bernardo Tolomei (1272–1348), Catholic saint, Italian theologian and founder of the Olivetans
- Bernard of Vienne (778–842), Catholic saint, French bishop of Vienne 810–842.
- St. Bernard (surname)

== Places ==
=== Canada ===
- Saint-Bernard-de-Lacolle, Quebec, municipality in Montérégie region
- Saint-Bernard, Quebec, municipality in Chaudière-Appalaches region
- Saint-Bernard-de-Michaudville, Quebec, municipality in Les Maskoutains Regional County Municipality, Montérégie region
- Saint-Bernard-sur-Mer, community in the municipality of L'Isle-aux-Coudres, Quebec
- St. Bernard, Nova Scotia, community in the District of Clare, Digby County

=== France ===
- Saint-Bernard, Ain, commune in Auvergne-Rhône-Alpes region
- Saint-Bernard, Côte-d'Or, commune in Bourgogne-Franche-Comté region
- Saint-Bernard, Haut-Rhin, commune in Alsace, Grand Est region
- Saint-Bernard, Isère, commune in Auvergne-Rhône-Alpes region

=== Philippines ===
- Saint Bernard, Southern Leyte, fourth-class municipality, Eastern Visayas region

=== United States ===
- St. Bernard, Ohio, a village
- St. Bernard Parish, Louisiana
  - Saint Bernard, Louisiana, an unincorporated community
- Saint Bernard, Nebraska, an unincorporated community
- St. Bernard Township, Platte County, Nebraska

== Other uses ==
- Saint Bernard (film), a 2000 Spanish comedy film
- St. Bernard, a brand formerly used by Dunnes Stores

== See also ==
- San Bernard (disambiguation)
- San Bernardino (disambiguation)
- San Bernardo (disambiguation)
- São Bernardo (disambiguation)
- St Bernard Pass (disambiguation)
- St. Bernard's School (disambiguation)
- St Bernard's College, Oxford, a former constituent college of the University of Oxford
- (Col du) Grand Saint-Bernard, French name for Great St Bernard Pass, road pass in south-western Switzerland, to Italy
  - Great St Bernard Tunnel, a tunnel circumventing Great St Bernard Pass
