= Cave of the Crystals =

Mexican cave renowned for its giant crystals

- Cueva de los cristales
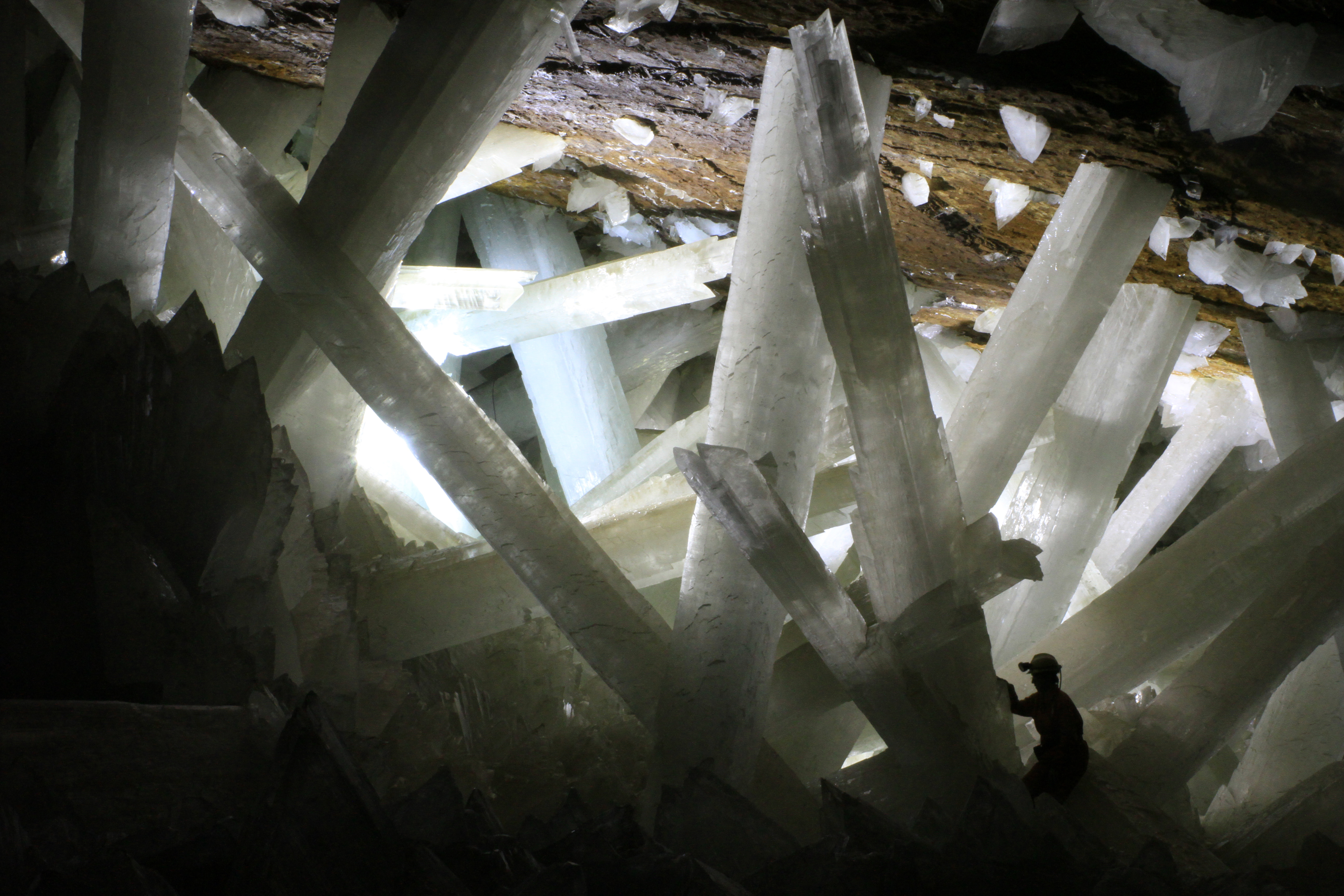
- Gypsum crystals in the Naica cave (with person at lower right for scale)

- Location within Mexico
- Location: Naica, Saucillo Municipality, Chihuahua, Mexico
- Coordinates: 27°51′3″N 105°29′47″W
- Length: 109 m (358 ft)
- Discovery: 2000
- Geology: Limestone
- Hazards: High temperature and humidity
- Access: Currently inaccessible

Cave of the Crystals (Spanish: Cueva de los cristales), also known as Naica Cave (Spanish: Cueva de Naica) or the Giant Crystal Cave, is a cave connected to the Naica Mine at a depth of 300 metres (980 ft), in Naica, Chihuahua, Mexico. It takes the form of a chamber within the limestone host rock of the mine, and is about 109 metres (358 ft) long with a volume of 5,000 to 6,000 cubic metres (180,000 to 210,000 ft^{3}).

The chamber contains giant selenite crystals (gypsum, CaSO_{4} · 2 H_{2}O), some of the largest natural crystals ever found. The largest is 11.4 metres (37 ft), with a volume of about 5 cubic metres (180 ft^{3}), and an estimated mass of 12 tonnes. When not flooded, the cave is extremely hot, with air temperatures reaching up to 58 °C (136 °F) with 90 to 99 percent humidity. This is comparable to temperature records in Death Valley, but with much wetter air that results in a much higher wet bulb temperature; this prevents cooling via sweating. The cave is relatively unexplored because of these factors. Without proper protection, people can only endure approximately ten minutes of exposure at a time.

The cave was discovered in April 2000 by brothers Juan and Pedro Sánchez while drilling in the mine. As of October 2015, the mine had reflooded and the cavern filled once more with the water rich in minerals required for the crystals to grow.

A group of scientists in the Naica Project have been studying these caverns.

== Formation of the crystals ==
Naica lies on a fault above an underground magma chamber which is approximately 3–5 kilometres (2–3 mi) below the cave. The magma heated the ground water which was saturated with sulfide ions (S^{2−}). Cool oxygenated surface water contacted the mineral-saturated heated water, but the two did not mix because of the difference in their densities. The oxygen slowly diffused into the heated water and oxidized the sulfides (S^{2−}) into sulfates (SO^{2−}_{4}) that precipitated as anhydrite (CaSO_{4}). When the overall temperature of the cave started to drop below 56 °C (133 °F), the hydrothermal and sedimentary anhydrite crystals dissolved, and gypsum (CaSO_{4}·2H_{2}O) crystals formed. The hydrated sulfate gypsum crystallized at an extremely slow rate over the course of at least 500,000 years, forming the enormous crystals found today.

== Discovery ==
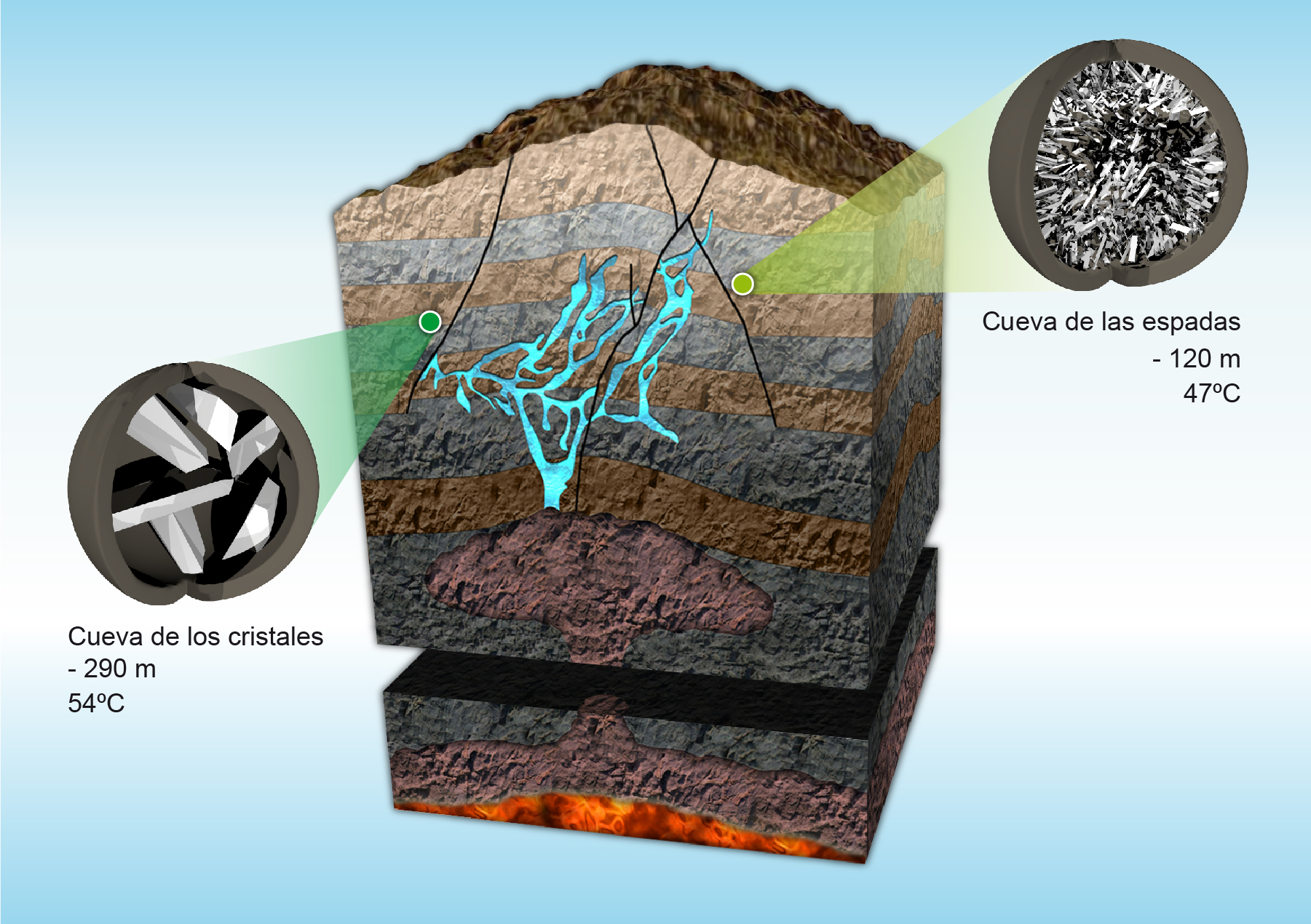
Location of the Swords and Crystal caves with the gypsum crystals within the idealized block diagram of Naica mine

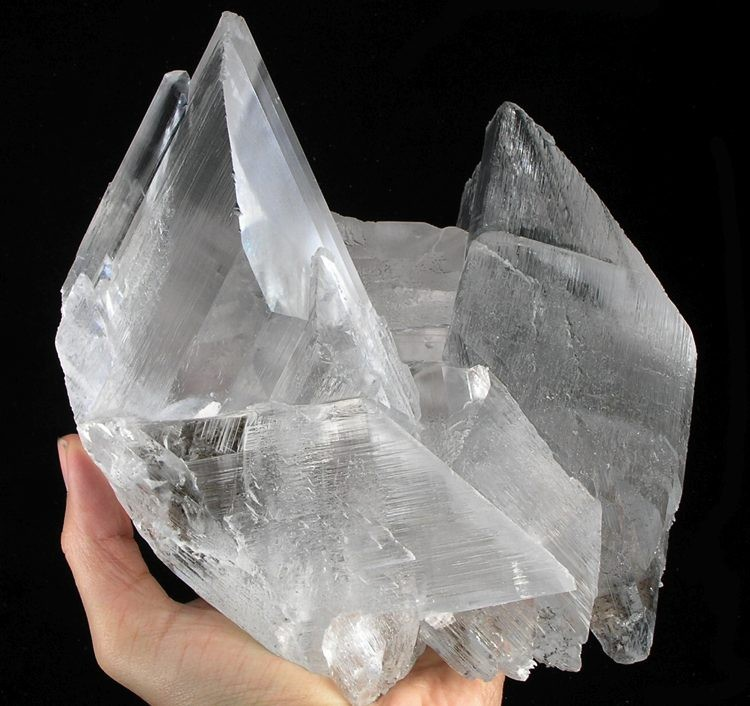
Water-clear selenite crystal "floater" from the Naica Mine. Size: 18 by 14 by 13 centimetres (7.1 in × 5.5 in × 5.1 in), weight 2.6 kilograms (5.7 lb)

In 1910, miners discovered a cavern beneath the Naica Mine workings, the Cave of Swords (Spanish: Cueva de las espadas). It is located at a depth of 120 metres (390 ft), above the Cave of the Crystals, and contains spectacular, smaller (1-metre (3 ft 3 in) long) crystals. It is speculated that at this level, transition temperatures may have fallen much more rapidly, leading to an end in the growth of the crystals.

Giant Crystal Cave was discovered in April 2000 by miners excavating a new tunnel for the Industrias Peñoles mining company located in Naica, Mexico, while drilling through the Naica fault, which they were concerned would flood the mine. The mining complex in Naica contains substantial deposits of silver, zinc and lead.

The Cave of Crystals is a horseshoe-shaped cavity in limestone. Its floor is covered with perfectly faceted crystalline blocks. Huge crystal beams jut out from both the blocks and the floor. The crystals deteriorate in air, so the Naica Project attempted to visually document the crystals before they deteriorated further.

Two other smaller caverns were also discovered in 2000, Queen's Eye Cave and Candles Cave, and another chamber was found in a drilling project in 2009. The new cave, named Ice Palace, by James Marc Beverly on a National Geographic expedition, is 150 metres (490 ft) deep and is not flooded, but its crystal formations are much smaller, with small "cauliflower" formations and fine, threadlike crystals.

== Exploration and scientific studies ==
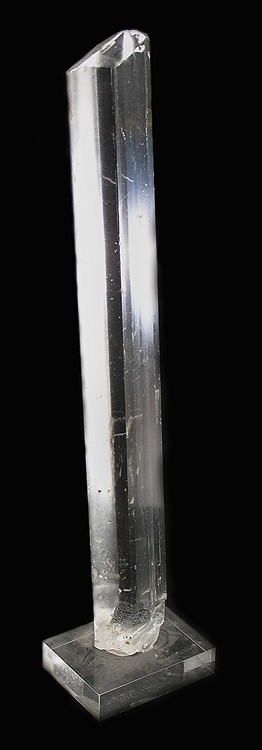
Selenite "sword", 22.6 by 2.6 by 1.6 centimetres (8.90 in × 1.02 in × 0.63 in). A small version of the giant crystals, likely found in a natural cavity in the mine.

A scientific team coordinated by Paolo Forti, specialist of cave minerals and crystallographer at the University of Bologna (Italy), explored the cave in detail in 2006. To survive and to be able to work in the extreme temperature and humid conditions which prevent prolonged incursion in the crystal chamber, they partnered with Ferrino and La Venta to develop their own refrigerated suits and cold breathing systems (respectively dubbed Tolomea suit and Sinusit respirator). Special caving overalls were fitted with a mattress of refrigerating tubes placed all over the body and connected to a backpack weighing about 20 kilograms (44 lb) containing a reservoir filled with cold water and ice. The cooling provided by melting ice was sufficient to provide about half an hour of autonomy.

Besides mineralogical and crystallographic studies, biogeochemical and microbial characterization of the gypsum giant crystals were performed. Stein-Erik Lauritzen (University of Bergen, Norway) performed uranium-thorium dating to determine the maximum age of the giant crystals, estimated at about 500,000 years. A team led by A. E. S. Van Driessche directly measured the growth rates of these giant gypsum crystals using present-day water of the Naica. They obtained a growth rate of (1.4±0.2)×10^{−5} nm/s, which is the slowest directly measured normal growth rate for any crystal growth process. At this rate, the largest crystals would have taken approximately 1 million years to reach their current size.

Penelope Boston (New Mexico Institute of Mining and Technology, US), speleologist and geomicrobiologist specialist of extremophile organisms, realized sterile sampling of gypsum drillcores by making small boreholes inside large crystals under aseptic conditions. The aim was to detect the possible presence of ancient bacteria encapsulated inside fluid and solid inclusions present in the calcium sulfate matrix from its formation. Solid inclusions mainly consist of magnesium and iron oxy-hydroxide, but no organic matter could be found associated with the solid hydroxides. No DNA from ancient bacteria could be extracted from the solid inclusions and amplified by PCR. Microbial studies on fluid inclusions are foreseen to attempt to evidence the presence of ancient micro-organisms in the original fluid solution in which the crystals developed. At the 2017 meeting of the American Association for the Advancement of Science, researchers, including Dr. Boston, announced the discovery of bacteria found in inclusions embedded in some of the crystals. Using sterile methods, the researchers were able to extract and reanimate these organisms, which are "not very closely related to anything in the known genetic databases."

Other researches covered the fields of palynology (pollen study), geochemistry, hydrogeology and the physical conditions prevailing in the Cave of Crystals.

== Closure ==
The cave was featured on the Discovery Channel program Naica: Beyond The Crystal Cave in February 2011. Earlier, it was featured on the History Channel program Life After People, in the episode "Depths of Destruction" of the second season. Additionally, these caves were also featured on the program Angry Planet, in season 3, episode 11. Exploration has given credence to the existence of further chambers, but further exploration would have required significant removal of the crystals. As the cave's accessibility is dependent on the mine's water pumps, once mining operations ceased, the caves were allowed to re-flood in October 2015.

If the mining company decides to open another entrance, researchers might again enter to continue their work, according to a February 2019 report.

== See also ==
- Nombre de Dios Grottoes – Cave system in the state of Chihuahua, Mexico
