= Saucillo Municipality =

Municipality in the Mexican state of Chihuahua

Saucillo
- Municipality
- Coat of arms

- Municipality of Saucillo in Chihuahua

- Location in Mexico
- Coordinates: 28°02′N 105°17′W
- Country: Mexico
- State: Chihuahua
- Municipal seat: Saucillo
- Founded: November 27, 1896

Area
  - Total: 2,116.16 km^{2} (817.05 sq mi)

Population (2010)
  - Total: 32,325
  - Density: 15.275/km^{2} (39.563/sq mi)

Saucillo is one of the 67 municipalities of Chihuahua, in northern Mexico. The municipal seat lies at Saucillo. The municipality covers an area of 2,116.16 km^{2} (817.05 sq mi).

As of 2010, the municipality had a total population of 32,325, up from 28,508 as of 2005.

As of 2010, the city of Saucillo had a population of 11,004. Other than the city of Saucillo, the municipality had 451 localities, the largest of which (with 2010 populations in parentheses) were: Naica (4,938), Las Varas (2,410), classified as urban, and Estación Conchos (1,670), and Orranteño (1,641), classified as rural.

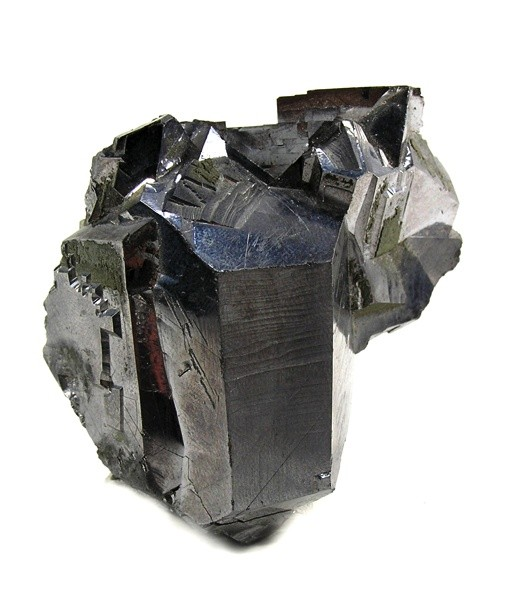
Galena crystal from the Naica Mine, Mexico's largest lead producer.

== Towns and villages ==
The municipality has 168 localities. The largest are:

| Name | Population (2005) |
|---|---|
| Saucillo | 9,261 |
| Naica | 4,775 |
| Las Varas | 2,355 |
| Conchos | 1,599 |
| Orranteño | 1,442 |
| Santa Gertrudis | 717 |
| Total Municipality | 28,508 |
