= San Bernardo, Puebla =

Village in Puebla, Mexico

Coordinates: 18°12′55″N 98°07′00″W

San Bernardo is a village in Puebla, Mexico.
