= St Bernard Pass =

St Bernard Pass may refer to:

- Great St Bernard Pass crosses the Valais Alps between Martigny, Switzerland and Aosta, Italy
- Little St Bernard Pass lies between Mont Blanc and the Graian Alps, connecting Bourg St Maurice, France to Courmayeur, Italy

== See also ==
- San Bernardino Pass in the Swiss Alps connecting Thusis and Bellinzona
