= San Bernardo, Tabasco =

Village in the Mexican state of Tabasco

Coordinates: 17°25′N 92°47′W

San Bernardo is a village in the Mexican state of Tabasco.
