= San Bernardo, Yucatán =

San Bernardo is the name of 2 villages in Yucatán, Mexico.

- One, also called Bernardo, is located at 20°38′N 89°57′W
- One is located at 20°14′N 89°41′W
