= San Bernardo, Guanajuato =

San Bernardo is the name of three villages in Guanajuato, Mexico.

- One village, also known as San Ber, is located at 20°58′N 101°52′W.

This is one of the small towns in the center of Mexico where most of the Bracero pioneers were from. By 1965 the most important income of families in Sanber Gto was from fathers working in California

- One village is located at 20°22′N 101°48′W.
- One village is located at 21°45′05″N 101°26′20″W.
