= San Bernardo, Hidalgo =

San Bernardo is the name of two villages in the Mexican state of Hidalgo.

- One is located at 20°49′N 98°43′W
- One is located at 20°36′N 98°40′W
