= San Bernardo, Baja California Sur =

San Bernardo
- Location in Mexico
- Coordinates: 25°32′N 111°45′W
- Country: Mexico
- State: Baja California Sur

San Bernardo is a village in Baja California Sur, Mexico.
