= Naica =

- Town
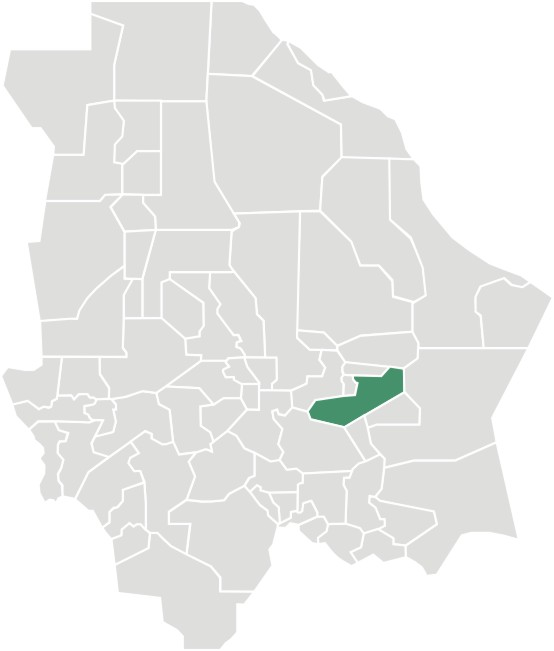
- Municipality of Saucillo in Chihuahua

- Location in Mexico
- Coordinates: 27°51′3″N 105°29′47″W
- Country: Mexico
- State: Chihuahua
- Municipality: Saucillo
- Founded: 1828

Population (2010)
  - Total: 4,938

Naica is a town in the Mexican state of Chihuahua. It is located in the municipality of Saucillo. As of 2010, the town of Naica had a population of 4,938, up from 4,775 in the 2005 INEGI Census.

It is a mining town and the location of the renowned Naica Mine.

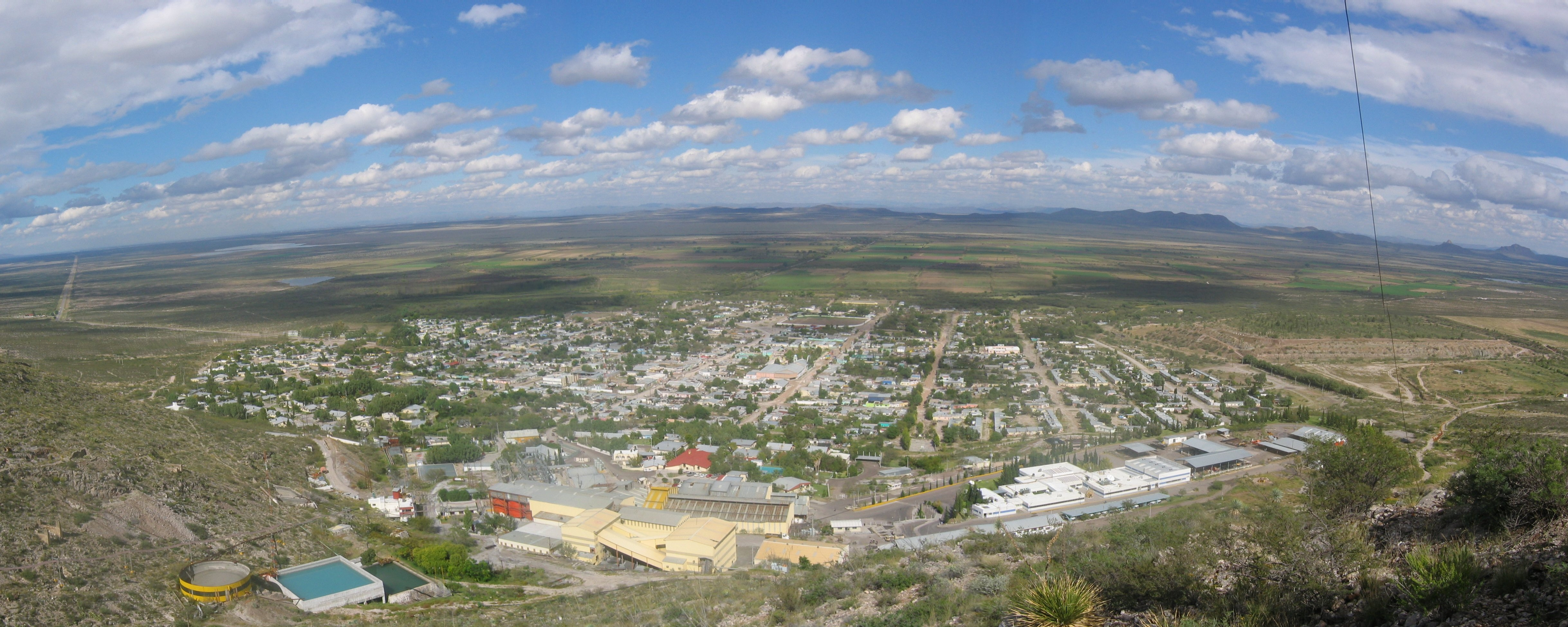
Panorama of Naica

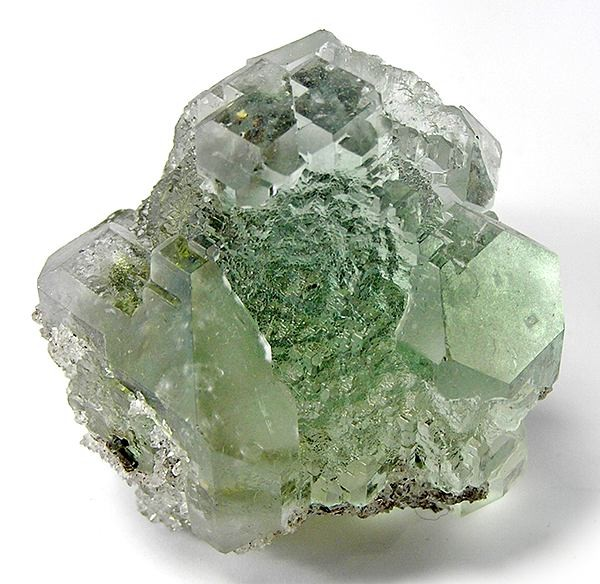
Fluorite specimen from Naica Mine. Note the clear "windows' into the transparent, light green interior of this compound crystal. Size: 4.7 cm × 4.5 cm × 3.9 cm (1 7/8 in × 1 3/4 in × 1 1/2 in).

== See also ==
- Cave of the Crystals
