= Naica Mine =

Mexican mine renowned for its giant gypsum crystals

Coordinates: 27°51′3″N 105°29′47″W

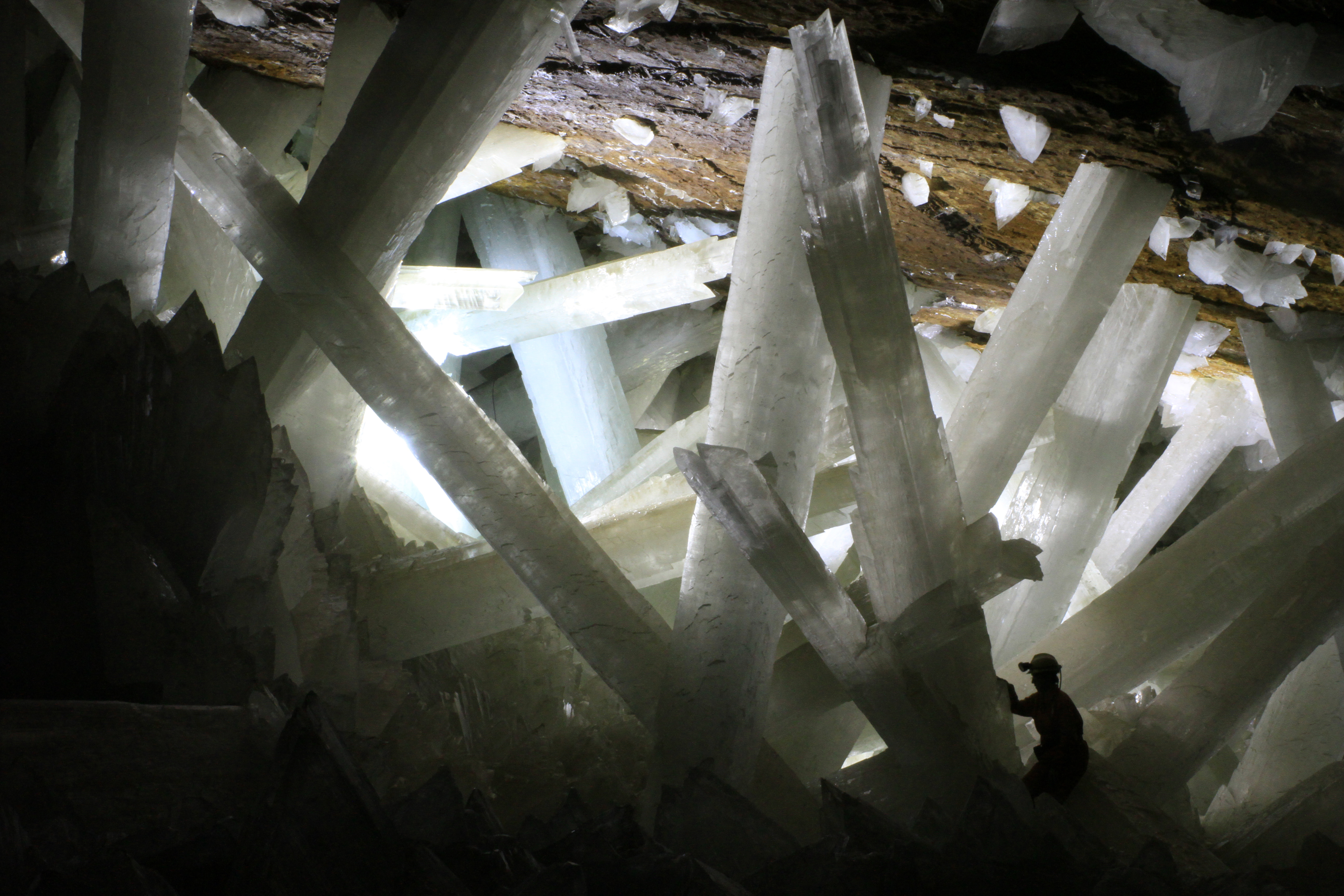
Enormous gypsum crystals (CaSO_{4} · 2 H_{2}O) in the most spectacular Naica cavern, found during mining. Note the size of the person at the bottom right for the scale.

The Naica Mine of the Mexican state of Chihuahua, is a lead, zinc and silver mine. Located in Naica in the municipality of Saucillo, the Naica Mine is owned by Industrias Peñoles, the world's largest silver producer. Caverns discovered during mining operations contain gigantic crystals of CaSO_{4} · 2 H_{2}O (calcium sulfate dihydrate, gypsum, also sometimes called selenite). Peñoles announced in October 2015 that it was indefinitely suspending operations due to uncontrollable flooding at the Naica Mine.

The peak underground air temperature was 58°C (136°F) with 100% relative humidity, which rapidly exposed the visitors to hyperthermia hazard and caused breathing difficulties. Because of the heat, unprotected researchers could only stay up to 10 minutes inside the cave. Longer visits required the use of a special suit fitted with a cooling system (ice reserve in a backpack with cooled water recirculating in polymer tubes installed over all the body surface) and delivering fresh air for easier breathing. The visits were limited to about half an hour, the time needed to melt the ice reserves.

== Cave of the Crystals ==
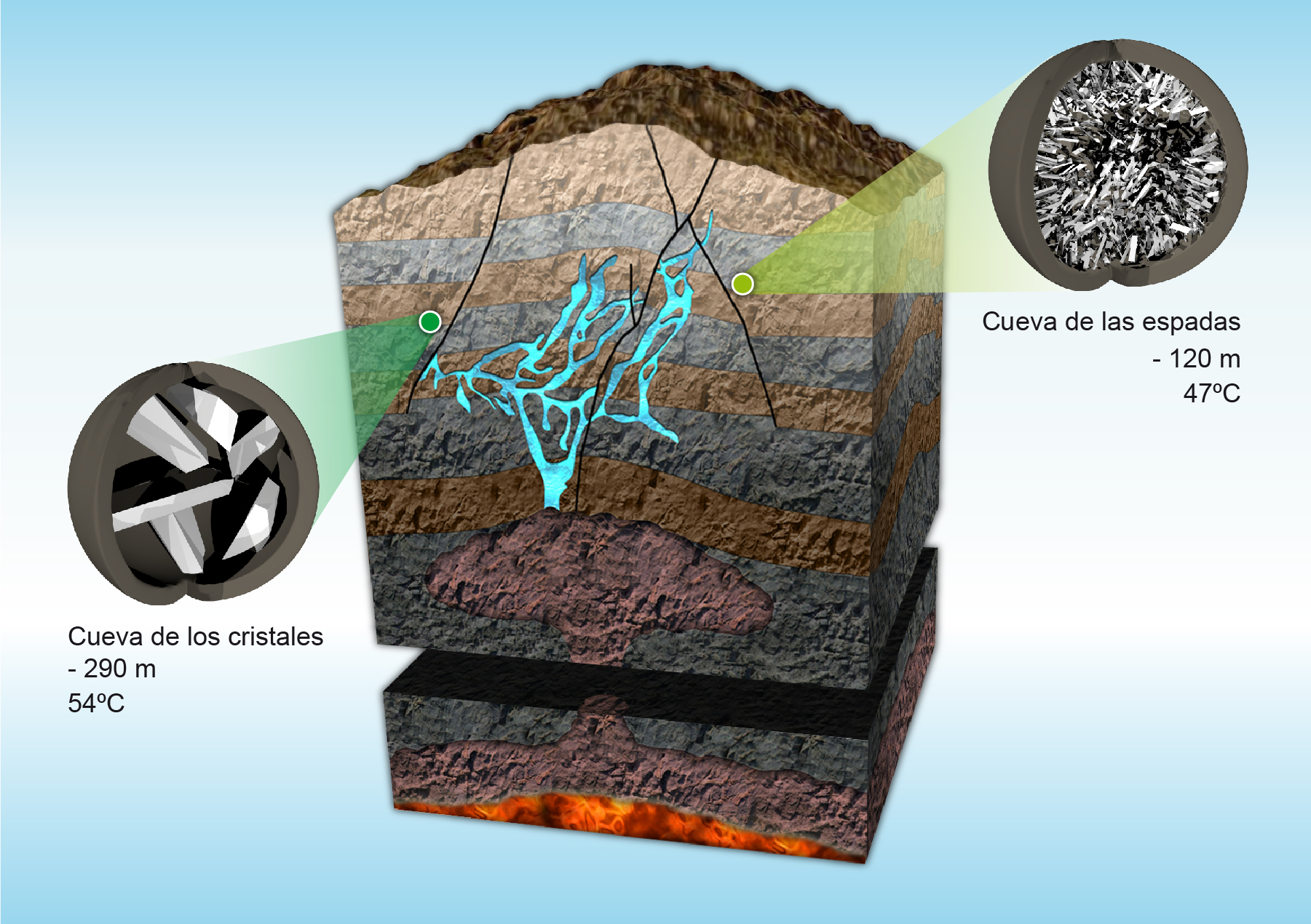
Location of the Swords and Crystal caves with the gypsum crystals within the conceptual block diagram of Naica mine

The Cave of the Crystals is a cave approximately 300 m (1,000 ft) below the surface in the limestone host rock of the mine, about 109-metre (358 ft) long, with a volume of 5,000 to 6,000 cubic metres (180,000 to 210,000 cu ft). The chamber contains giant selenite crystals, some of the largest natural crystals ever found. The largest is 11.40 metres (37.4 ft), with a volume of about 5 cubic metres (180 cu ft), and an estimated mass of 12 tonnes.

The selenite crystals were formed by hydrothermal fluids heated by the magma chamber below. The cavern was discovered while the miners were drilling through a newly drained area. The caves are closed to the public, and remain closed after a worker tried to enter the cave to steal some of the selenite, only to suffocate and die in the cave's humid and inhospitable atmosphere.

Reports in 2017 stated that scientists had found "long-dormant microbes" in the crystals and removed them for further research. The cave was closed in 2015 and some of the chambers were allowed to flood again to continue the process of crystal growth. If the mining company decides to open another entrance, researchers might again enter to continue their work, according to a February 2019 report.

== The Cave of Swords ==
The Cave of Swords (Cueva de Espadas) is the second-largest chamber in the Naica Mine, at 104-metre (341 ft) long, with a volume of 1,400 cubic metres (49,000 cu ft). It also contains gypsum crystals that are each about a meter long, due to the fact that these crystals are younger and had been growing for much less time by the time they were discovered in 1910.

== Gallery ==
Crystals from the Naica mine
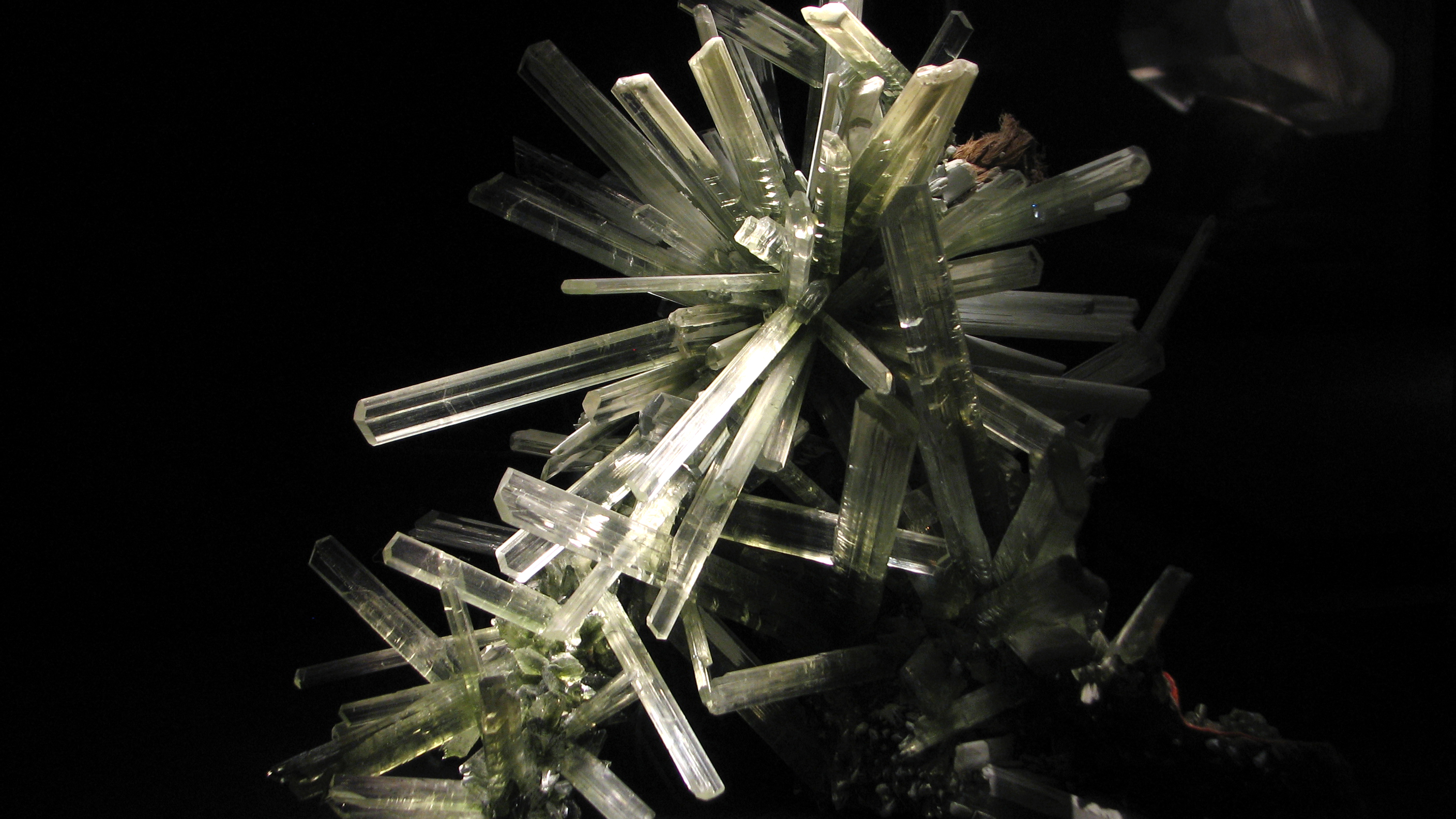
Selenite crystals from Naica mine. Scale unknown.

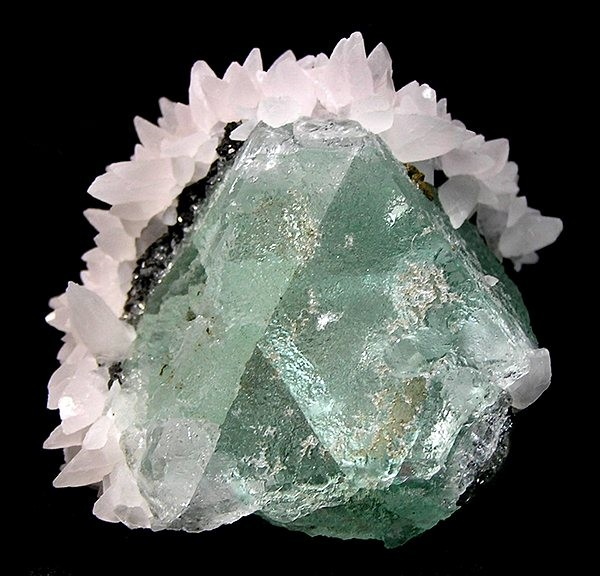
Green fluorite framed by white calcite, Naica Mine, mined in the 1980s. Size: 5.5 cm × 5.1 cm × 4.4 cm (2 1/4 in × 2 in × 1 3/4 in).

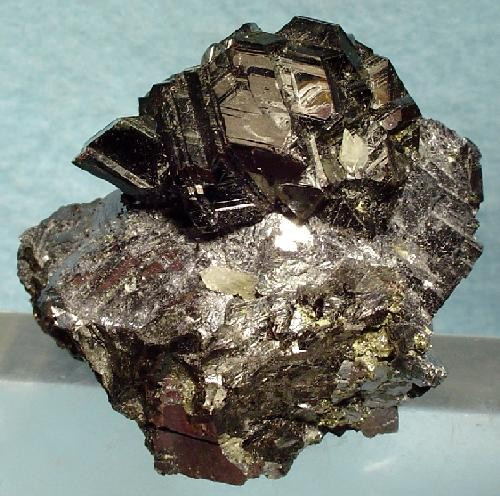
Sphalerite and galena ore specimen from the Naica mine. Size: 4.7 cm × 3.6 cm × 2.6 cm (1 3/4 in × 1 1/2 in × 1 in).
