= San Bernardino, Chihuahua =

Human settlement in Chihuahua, Mexico

Coordinates: 28°12′N 106°28′W

San Bernardino is a village in Chihuahua, Mexico.
