= Barefooting =

Barefooting may refer to:

- Barefoot skiing
- Barefoot hiking
- Barefoot running
- Going barefoot

Barefootin' may refer to:

- Barefootin', an autobiography by Unita Blackwell
- "Barefootin'" (song), a 1965 song by Robert Parker

== See also ==
- Barefoot
