= Huarache =

Huarache may refer to:

- Huarache (shoe), a Mexican sandal
- Huarache (running shoe), a running sandal inspired by Tarahumara Indians
- Huarache (food), a masa-based Mexican dish
