= Vivobarefoot =

British minimalist shoe company

- Industry: Textile
- Products: Footwear
- Website: vivobarefoot.com

Vivobarefoot is a minimalist running shoe company. Their technology, invented by Tim Brennan and developed by British shoe company Terra Plana, is aimed at offering the optimum biomechanics and posture commonly associated with walking barefoot and barefoot running, and advocated within the barefoot movement and barefoot running community. Their marketing describes the walking experience as "as close to going barefoot in the city as you can get." In 2019, the most prominent shoe using this technology was their Evo running shoe. In 2022, Vivobarefoot sold 773,000 pairs of shoes.

== See also ==
- Barefoot running
- Minimalist shoe
- Vibram FiveFingers
- Xero Shoes
