= Vibram =

Italian company specialized in rubber outsoles for footwear

Vibram S.p.A.
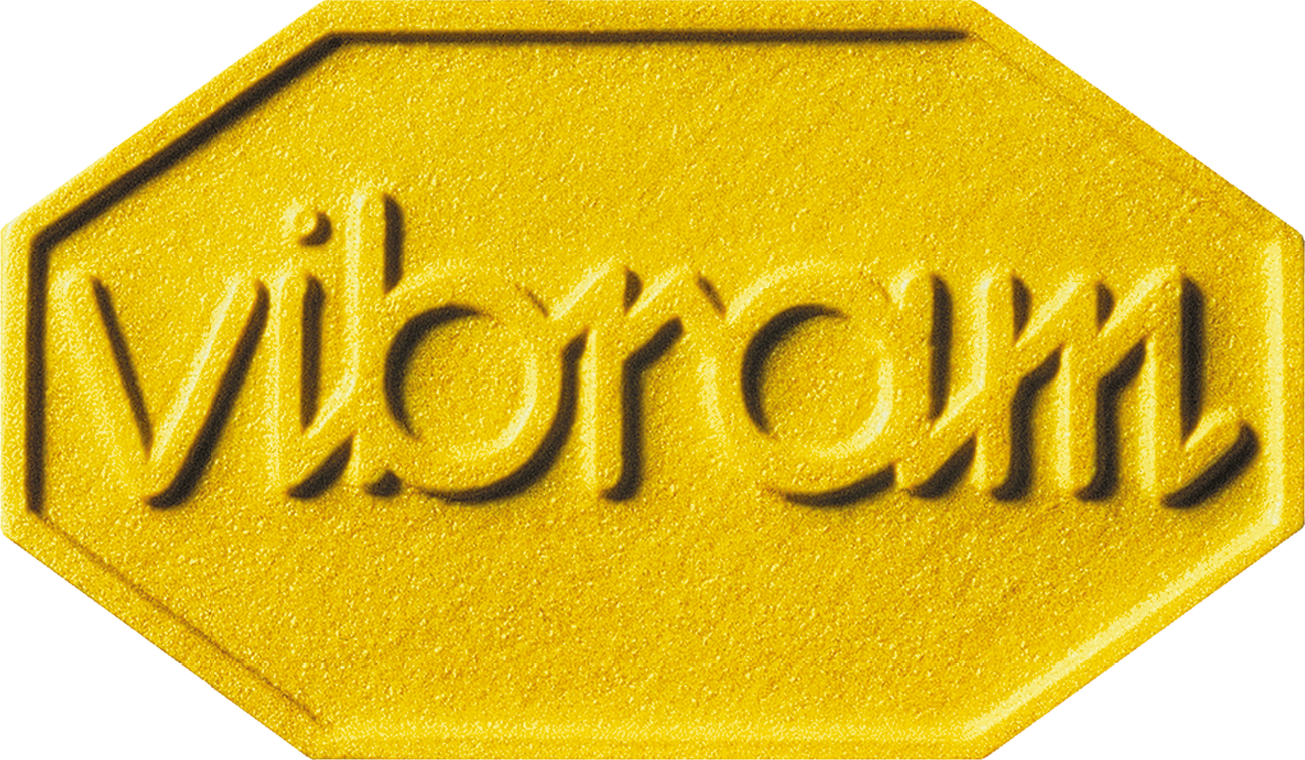
- Type: Private
- Industry: Footwear
- Founded: 1937
- Headquarters: Albizzate, Italy
- Products: Rubber Soles; Footwear; Disc Golf Discs
- Website: www.vibram.com

Vibram S.p.A. is an Italian company based in Albizzate, Italy, that manufactures and licenses the production of Vibram-branded rubber outsoles for footwear. The company is named after its founder, Vitale Bramani, who is credited with inventing the first rubber lug soles. Vibram soles were first used on mountaineering boots, replacing leather soles fitted with hobnails or steel cleats which were commonly used up until then. The soles produced by Vibram are called Vibram soles, Vibram rubber, or simply Vibram.

== History ==
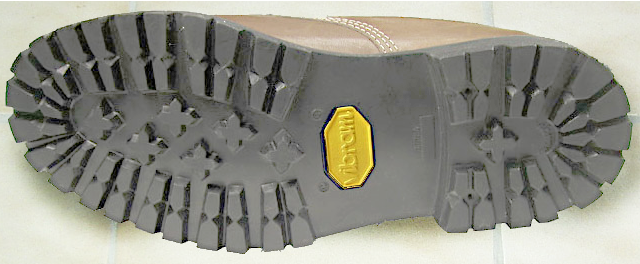
Detail of original Vibram "Carrarmato" lug sole design, with the yellow emblem of Vibram (November 2011)

The deaths of six of Bramani's mountaineering friends in the Italian Alps on September 15, 1935, were partly blamed on "inadequate footwear". The tragedy drove Bramani to develop a new climbing sole. Two years later, he patented his invention and launched the first rubber lug soles on the market with a new tread design called the "Carrarmato" (i.e. "tank tread"), with the financial backing of Leopoldo Pirelli of Pirelli Tyres.

The sole was designed to provide excellent traction on the widest range of surfaces and have high abrasion resistance. It was made using the latest vulcanized rubber. The first successful ascent to the summit of K2 was made by an Italian expedition wearing Vibram rubber on their soles in July 1954.

The company opened a store in Boston in 2012 to showcase their FiveFingers line of glove-styled shoes. The shop was relaunched in April 2020. A Vibram Academy opened in London in 2016.

== Products ==
Vibram soles are manufactured in Brazil, China, Italy, the Czech Republic, and the United States and are used by more than 1,000 footwear manufacturers in their products. In the United States, the soles are made under exclusive license by Quabaug Corporation of North Brookfield, Massachusetts, which was acquired by Vibram in June 2015.

Although the brand is best known among the outdoor and mountaineering community, Vibram produces numerous models of soles that are specifically designed for fashion, military, rescue, law enforcement, or industrial use. Vibram also produces soles that are used exclusively for footwear resoling.

With its FiveFingers line of shoes, which mimic the look and mechanics of being barefoot, Vibram helped to inspire the movement of barefoot running and running while wearing only minimalist footwear. Referring to the period of the late 2000s, SneakerFreaker Magazine said, "A barefoot revolution was underway, and the Vibram FiveFingers was leading the charge." However the company also agreed to settle a lawsuit that claimed that it had misrepresented the health benefits of running in its shoes.

Vibram soles are a market leader in hiking soles, chosen by shoe manufacturers for their reputation for traction and durability.

== Controversies ==
A lawsuit was filed against Vibram in April 2012, over claims made about their Vibram FiveFingers, their minimalist shoe. Vibram claimed that the shoe "reduce(s) foot injuries, and strengthen(s) foot muscles." The claim was based on Gert-Peter Bruggermann's research, accepted at the 2005 Conference for the International Society of Biomechanics.

Later, a controlled study published in July 2013 showed that the risk of bone marrow edema among new wearers increased during their respective transition periods to minimalist shoes when worn for extended periods. While Vibram, according to court papers, expressly denied "any actual or potential fault... or liability", it was announced in 2014 that the company had moved to settle the suit and agreed to set aside $3.75 million to pay refunds of up to $94 to anyone who had purchased the product since March 21, 2009.

== Trivia ==
Vibram shoes were sported by European statesman Jean Monnet, one of the founding fathers of the European Union. He specifically mentioned them in an interview he gave in 1955 to French journalist André Fontaine for French newspaper Le Monde, in which he hinted at the forthcoming creation of the Action Committee for the United States of Europe.

Vibram soles were used as a product placement for Bee Movie in 2007.
