= VFF =

VFF may refer to:

- Vancouver Asian Film Festival
- Vanuatu Football Federation
- Vendsyssel FF, a Danish football club
- Viborg FF, a Danish football club
- Vibram FiveFingers, a type of athletic shoe
- Vietnam Football Federation
- Vietnamese Fatherland Front, an umbrella group of pro-government "mass movements" in Vietnam
- Voices for Freedom, a New Zealand anti-vaccination advocacy group
