= Minimalist shoe =

Shoes that approximate barefoot running

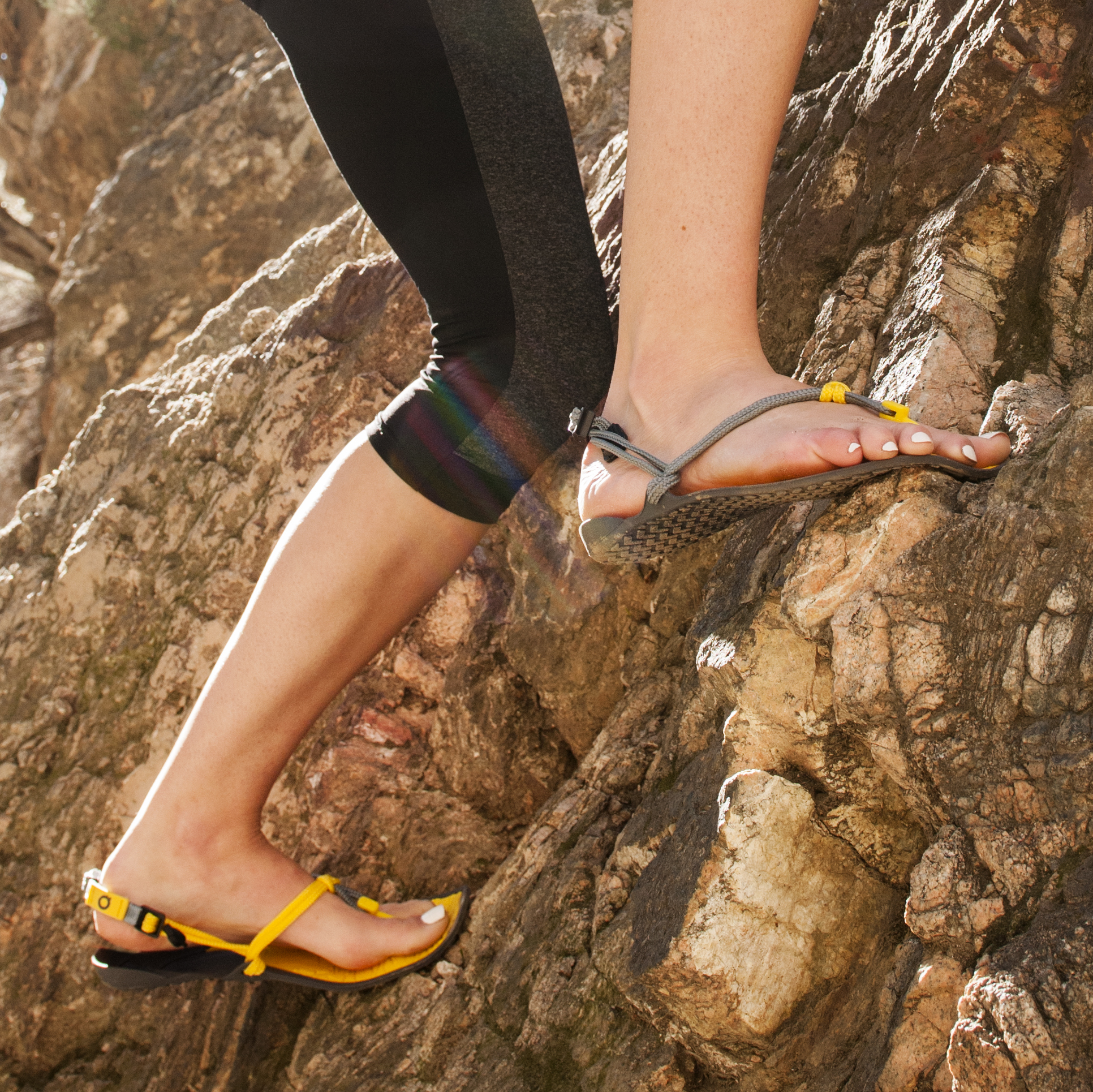
A person climbing in minimal sandals

Minimalist shoes (also known as barefoot shoes or barefoot socks) are intended to closely approximate barefoot running or walking conditions in comparison to traditional shoes. Minimalist shoes are defined as providing "minimal interference with the natural movement of the foot, because of its high flexibility, low heel to toe drop, weight and stack height, and the absence of motion control and stability devices." They provide more sensory contact for the foot on the ground while simultaneously providing the feet with some protection from ground hazards and conditions (such as pebbles and dirt). Research shows that wearing a minimalist shoe can help improve running economy, foot strength and arch function.

== Types ==
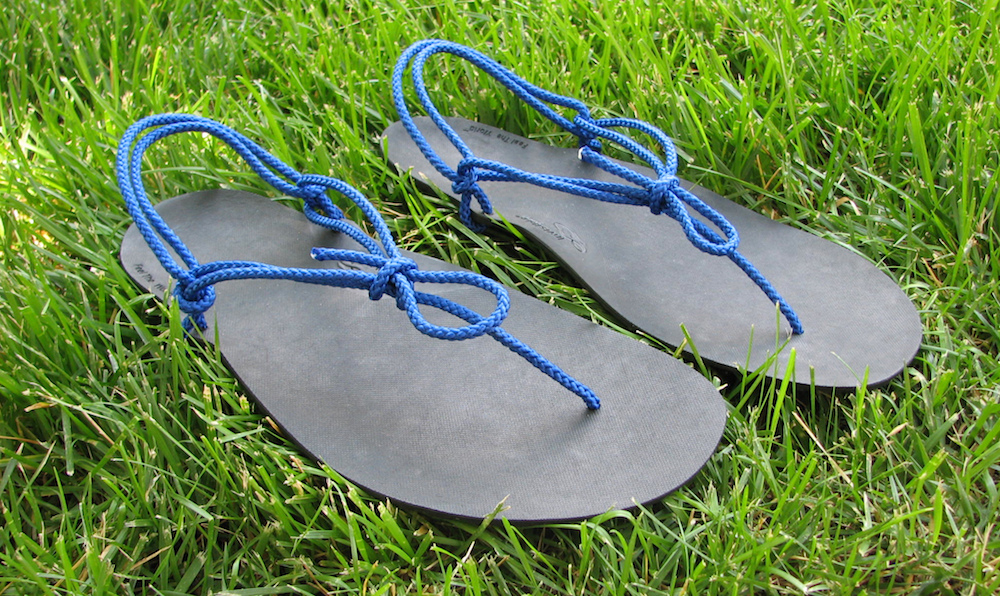
Huaraches are a type of minimalist shoe

In their 2018 paper for the Journal of Sports Sciences, Devon R. Coetzee their co-authors defined minimalist footwear as having a sole and upper that weighed 200-gram (7.1 oz) or less and were highly flexible, a heel height of 20 millimetres (0.79 in) or shorter, and a "heel-toe differential" of 7 millimetres (0.28 in) or less.

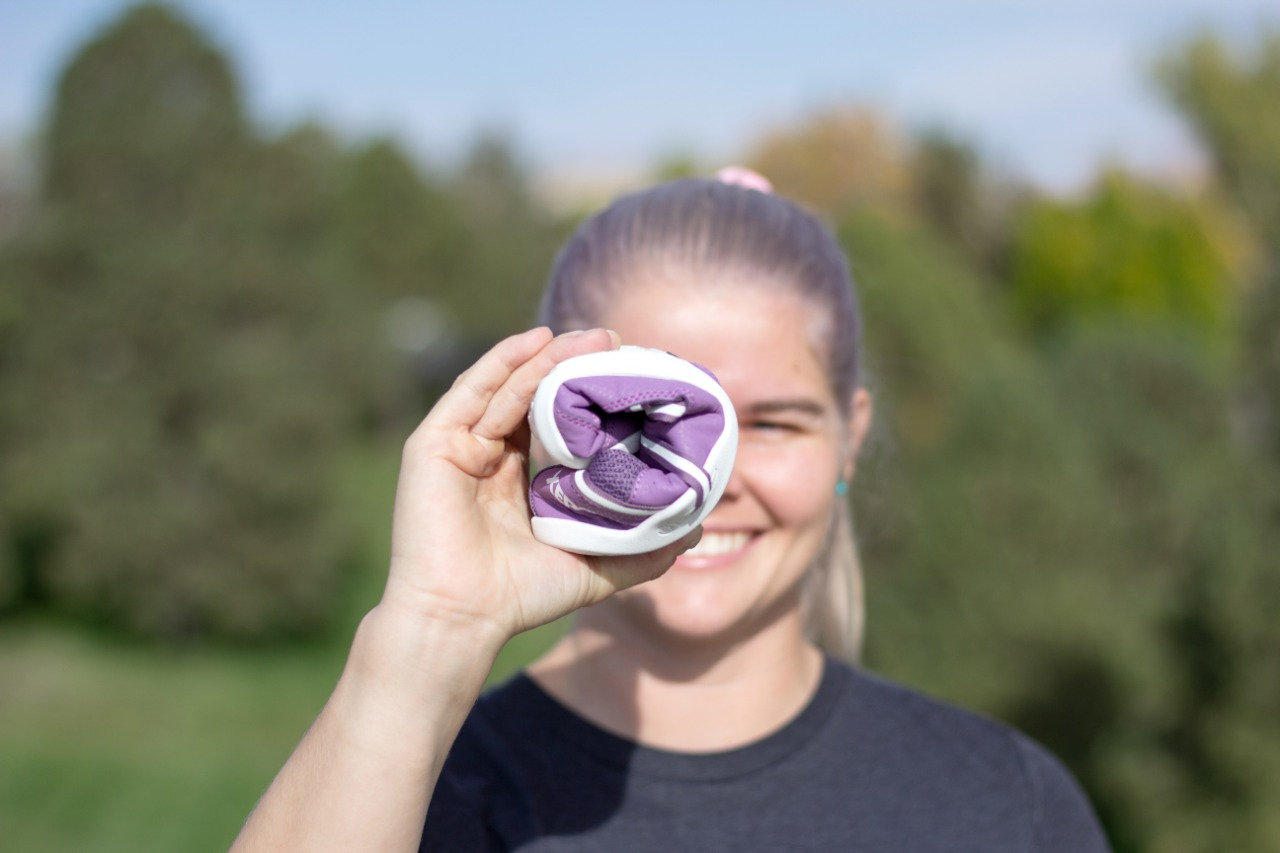
Minimal shoes are generally thin and flexible enough to "roll up"

Generally, there are two types of minimalist shoes:

- Barefoot Running Shoes are characterized by their zero drop from heel to toe, no arch support, minimal cushioning at the heel, and a very thin sole of around 3-10mm. Also, the toe box is considerably wider to provide more space to the toes, whereby they slightly resemble the shape of ducks' feet, when viewed from above and compared to traditional shoes. Few product lines fall into this category. Examples include the Vibram FiveFingers and Merrell Glove, which use an outsole produced by Vibram, or the Xero Prio.
- Minimalist Running Shoes are in between traditional running shoes and barefoot running shoes. They have a reduced heel-to-toe drop of about 4–8 mm, reduced cushioning and reduced or no arch support. The toe box is usually in-between barefoot and traditional running shoes.

Major companies also started producing shoes targeted at barefoot runners. These shoes do not usually meet the requirement of a minimal or barefoot shoe.

== Effects ==
Although running injuries are more common during the first period after adopting minimalist footwear, there is a lack of evidence about the long-term injury potential of minimalist shoes compared to standard ones. A 2022 review found that minimalist shoes increase the size and strength of the foot muscles in healthy individuals.

A 2020 systematic review found that "minimalist shoes can improve running economy and build the cross-sectional area and stiffness of Achilles tendon but also induce greater loading of the ankle and metatarsophalangeal joint" compared to non-minimalist shoes.

A 2023 systematic review and meta-analysis found that "minimalist footwear may reduce peak patellofemoral joint loads slightly" compared with conventional footwear during running, while medial support insoles do not appear to alter patellofemoral joint loads during walking or running.

A 2026 randomised crossover study in adolescents with patellofemoral pain found that "running in minimalist shoes reduced peak resultant patellofemoral joint and lateral patellar forces" compared with motion-control shoes, while peak gastrocnemius muscle forces increased and quadriceps forces were largely unchanged.

== See also ==
- List of shoe styles
- Huarache (running shoe)
- Vibram FiveFingers
- Vivobarefoot
- Xero Shoes
