= Vibram FiveFingers =

Brand of minimalist shoes

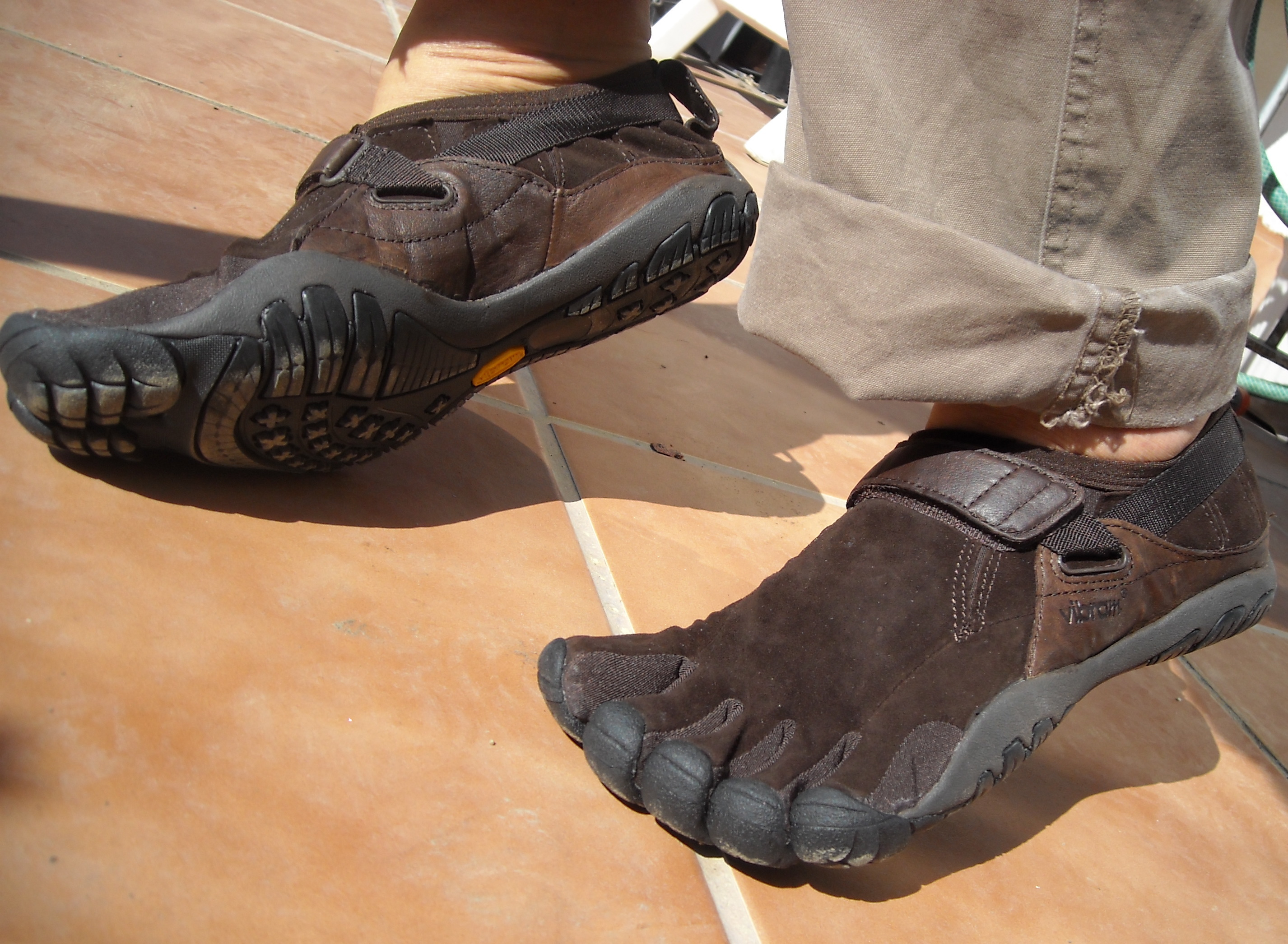
FiveFingers KSO Trek

Vibram FiveFingers are a type of minimalist shoe manufactured by Vibram, originally marketed as a more natural alternative for outdoor activities (sailing, kayaking, canoeing, and as a camping or after-hike shoe). The footwear is meant to replicate being barefoot and has thin, flexible soles that are contoured to the shape of the human foot, including visible individual sections for the toes. The company settled a lawsuit in 2014 alleging false health claims and set aside $3.75 million to pay refunds of up to $94 to anyone who had purchased the product since March 21, 2009.

== Origin ==
The overall Vibram FiveFingers concept was invented by Robert Fliri, a design student from Vinschgau who wanted to "figure out a way to move around in nature better". In 2005, Fliri pitched his idea to Vibram, which was unknown to consumers then despite its numerous shoe manufacturer partnerships; after all of the company's partners rejected the idea, Vibram elected to develop it into a product and market it directly under its own name. Vibram FiveFingers were developed and introduced in 2005. The original shoe was introduced in the United States at 25 stores nationwide in early 2006.

=== Purpose ===
Vibram FiveFingers were originally targeted at yacht racers to maintain grip on slippery decks without compromising the barefoot experience. Their potential use as a minimalist running shoe was suggested by the Vibram USA CEO to Ted McDonald, a runner who earned the nickname "Barefoot Ted" and ran in the shoes during the 2006 Boston Marathon as part of the brand launch. The purpose of these shoes, as outlined by the manufacturers, is to provide footwear mainly used for fitness, running, water sports, yoga, trekking, travelling, and other sports.

== Design ==
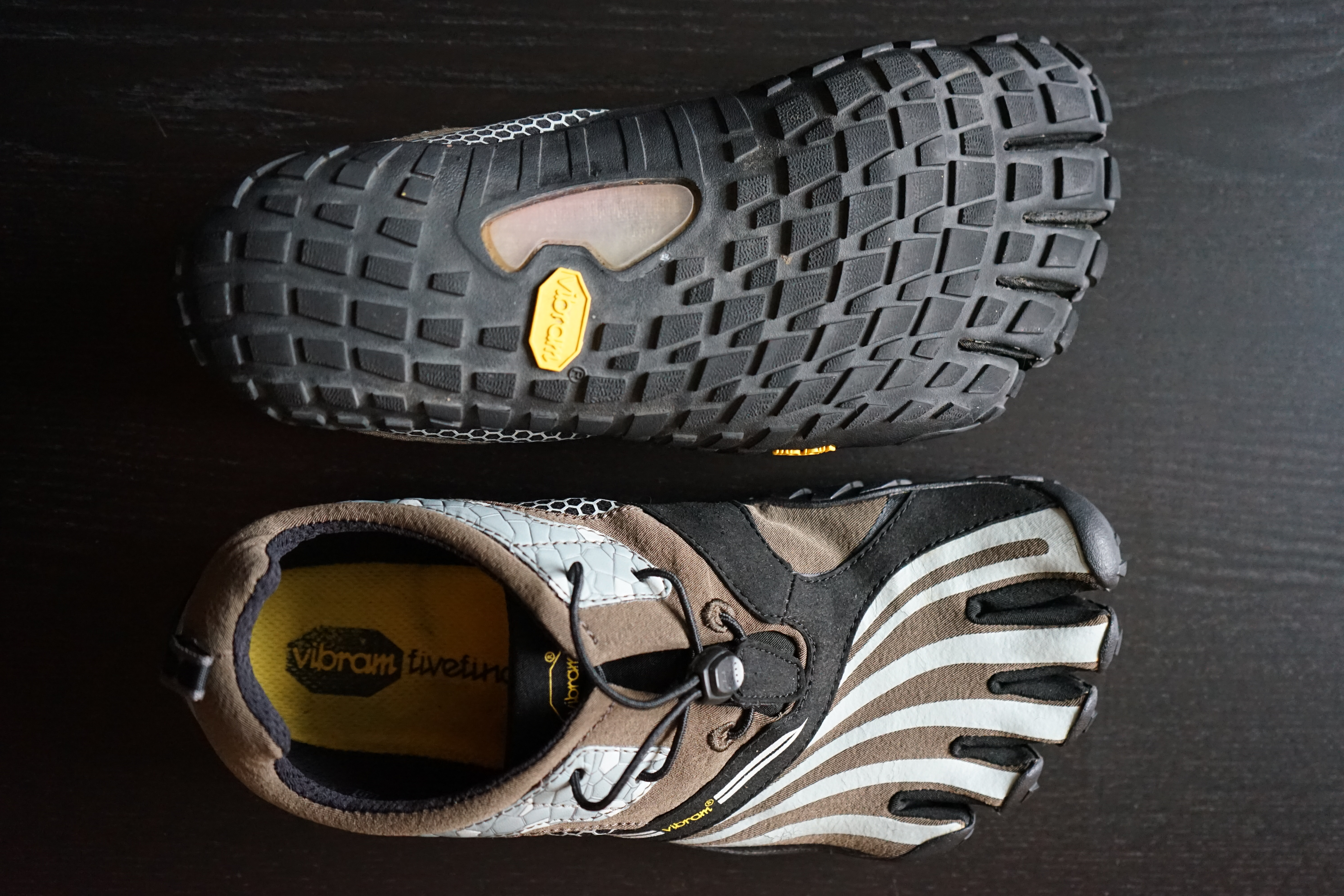
FiveFingers Spyridon LS

Vibram FiveFingers comprise many different materials that vary depending on the style of shoe. The most common components are Vibram TC-1 performance rubber, which makes up the sole of these shoes, a thin stretch polyamide comprising the frame of the shoe that molds to the contours of the user's foot, and an antimicrobial microfiber footbed. Shoe sizes correspond to quarter-inch increments in foot length, closely resembling the Continental European system.

In addition to their traditional outdoor/fitness models, Vibram has collaborated with fashion labels since 2020 to develop designer footwear on at least three occasions: a $1,300 "Toe" shoe released by Balenciaga, a shoe with painted nails produced by Japanese footwear brand Suicoke and label Midorikawa, and a shoe based on traditional sneakers from Suicoke and designer Takahiro Miyashita. The collaborations have occurred amid a resurgence of popularity for minimalist shoes fueled by interest in their purported health benefits and in Maison Margiela's tabi-style footwear, with the FiveFingers line gaining in popularity among women. The V-Soul, a model based on ballet flats and Mary Jane shoes, became a fashion trend in 2025 as interest in minimalist shoes and in Mary Jane-style sneakers converged.

== Minimalist shoes ==
In a report on an article in Nature, co-author Daniel E. Lieberman (whose research was partially funded by Vibram) stated that "People who wear conventional running shoes tend to run with a significantly different strike than those who run in minimalist shoes or barefoot. More specifically, the ball of the foot should strike the ground before the heel when running (or walking) barefoot or in minimalist shoes. By landing on the middle or front of the foot, barefoot runners have almost no impact collision." Lieberman has "emphasized that his research does not include data on injury or show that barefoot running is better for you" but that it is "a reasonable hypothesis that needs to be tested". Lieberman et al.'s study was an experiment that involved five groups of runners from Kenya and the United States. The two American groups were adult athletes who had run with shoes since childhood, and those who habitually run barefoot or with minimal footwear such as Vibram FiveFingers (mentioned by name in the study). The three Kenyan groups were adults who had never run in shoes until late adolescence, as well as two teenage groups: those that habitually wore shoes and those that always ran barefoot. The runners were instructed to run over a force plate that was embedded in a 25-meter track, and were recorded during the run using a three-dimensional infrared kinematic system. These measurements were used to assess the pattern with which the foot strikes the ground and how forcibly it does so.

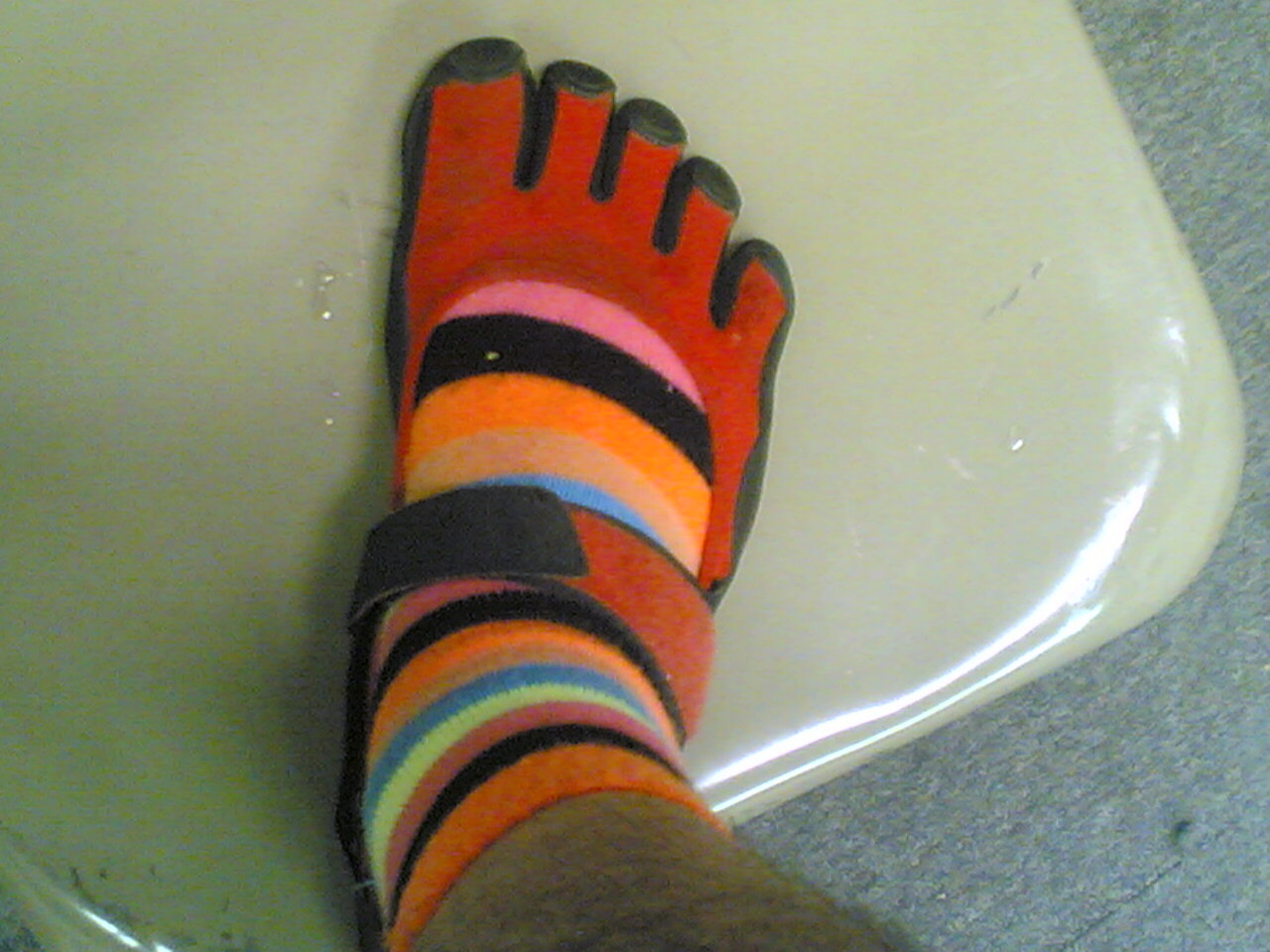
FiveFingers with toe socks

=== Health effects ===
Barefoot running, which is similar to running with FiveFingers on, appears to decrease the risk of ankle sprain and plantar fasciitis.

If not conditioned slowly enough, especially when transitioning away from heelstrike running or from wearing shoes with an elevated heel, the sole of the foot or plantar fascia can become inflamed or damaged with activity. Also due to over-training or incorrect form, runners may experience Achilles tendonitis or metatarsal inflammation and fractures. Over-striding in Vibram FiveFingers, that is, landing with the foot too far in front of one's hips, adds extra unnecessary stress to the calf muscles, Achilles tendon, and the arch of the foot, which can lead to serious health problems if not addressed.

One study found a greater number of new wearers of FiveFingers showed an increase in bone marrow edema than those in the study's control group. It recommended transition to use of the shoe be very slow and gradual.

=== Lawsuits ===
In 2012, an initial lawsuit was filed against Vibram over claims made about their FiveFingers minimalist shoe. Vibram claimed that the shoe "reduce[s] foot injuries and strengthen[s] foot muscles". The claim was based on Gert-Peter Brüggemann research accepted at the 2005 Conference for the International Society of Biomechanics. While Vibram has "expressly" denied "any actual or potential fault ... or liability", on May 7, 2014, it was announced that company has moved to settle the suit and agreed to set aside $3.75 million to pay refunds of up to $94 to anyone who had purchased the product since March 21, 2009.

In 2015, the family of deceased Ethiopian Olympic runner Abebe Bikila filed a lawsuit against Vibram for using and trademarking the Bikila name without permission. The suit was dismissed in 2016 on the basis that the Bikila family unreasonably delayed in seeking to enforce their rights. The family had become aware of Vibram's use of the Bikila name in 2011. Following the dismissal, the Bikila family's attorney stated that "Vibram has never asked the Bikila Family for permission, nor compensated them for using Abebe Bikila’s personality."

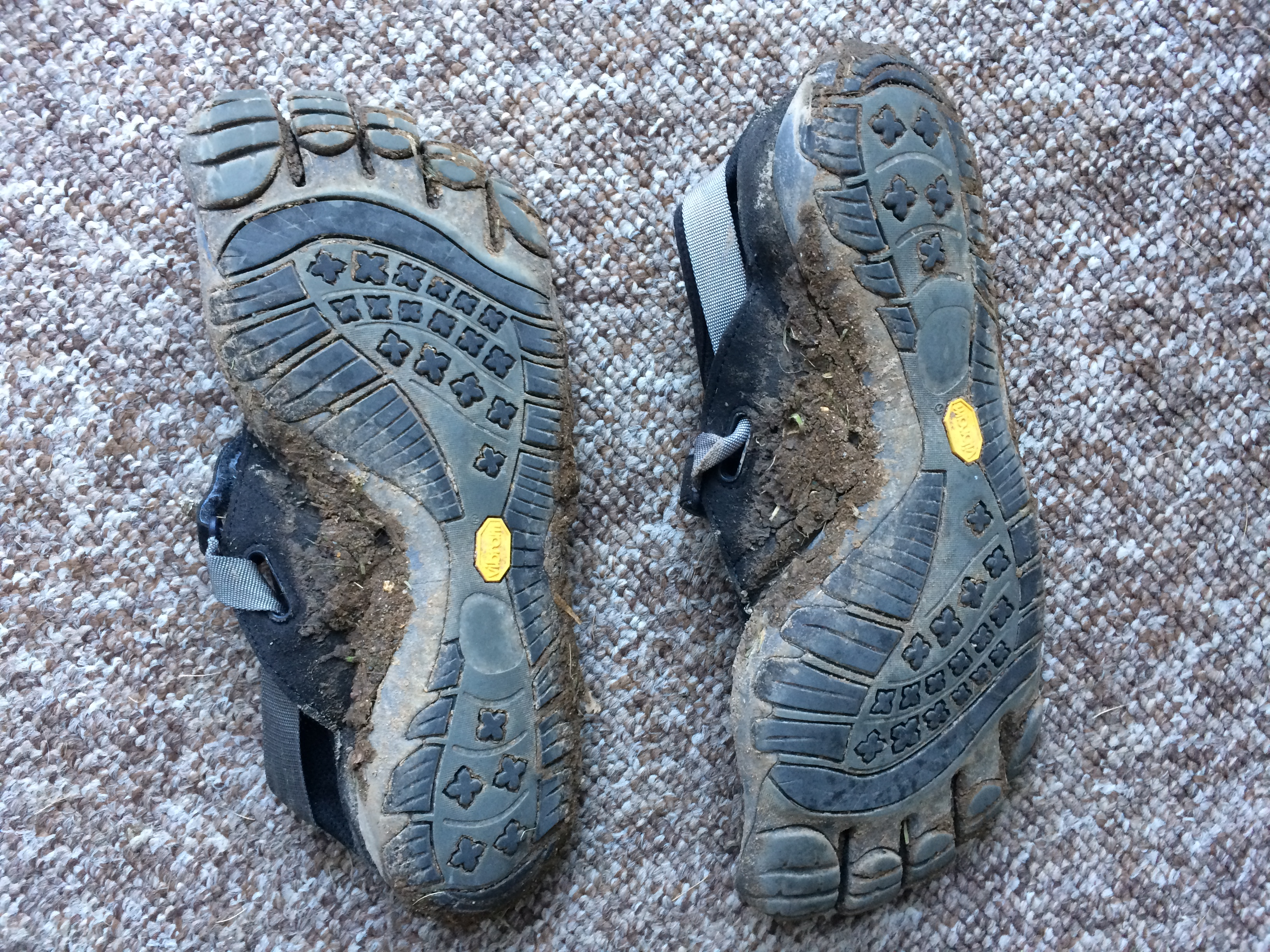
Trail Vibram shoes after a muddy run

== See also ==
- List of shoe styles
- Jika-tabi
- Minimalist shoe
- Toe socks
- Tabi
- Vivobarefoot
- Xero Shoes
