= Barefoot =

Common term for the state of not wearing any footwear

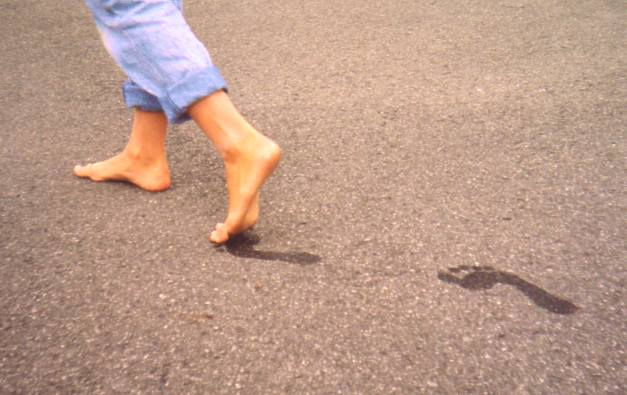
Barefoot person leaving footprints behind

Being barefoot is the state of not wearing any footwear.

There are health benefits and some risks associated with going barefoot. Shoes, while they offer protection, can limit the flexibility, strength, and mobility of the foot and can lead to higher incidences of flexible flat foot, bunions, hammer toe, and Morton's neuroma. Walking and running barefoot results in a more natural gait, allowing for a more rocking motion of the foot, eliminating the hard heel strike and generating less collision force in the foot and lower leg.

There are many sports that are performed barefooted, most notably gymnastics, martial arts and swimming, but also beach volleyball, barefoot running, barefoot hiking, and barefoot waterskiing.

== Historical and religious aspects ==
=== Historical aspects ===
Buddhist monks in Mahagandhayon Monastery (Amarapura, Myanmar). Monks line up barefoot to accept their late morning meal offered by donors.

The ancient Spartans required boys to go barefoot as part of their obligatory military training, and the athletes at the ancient Olympic Games typically participated barefoot and naked. Although the Greeks had a great variety of footwear, many—famously including Socrates—preferred to go barefoot.

The ancient Romans considered the calceus part of their national dress and used footwear to signal class distinctions. Patricians typically wore dyed and ornamented shoes with their togas or armor, while plebeians wore rawhide or hobnail boots and slaves were usually required to be barefoot. The discomfort of Roman shoes and boots, however, typically caused even the wealthy to go barefoot or use slippers at home, despite considering them effeminate, foreign, or lower-class when worn in public. It was considered a notable oddity of Augustus that he continued to wear his calceus at all times.

The Chinese similarly considered their footwear an important mark of civilization, although some Taoist immortals and gods like Xuanwu are usually depicted without shoes. Owing to the importance of reflexology to traditional Chinese medicine, many parks across East Asia have pathways of raised stones that people can walk along barefoot for supposed health benefits. From 1965 to 1981, the People's Republic of China also emphasized the training and provision of "barefoot doctors", so called because the rural doctors of southeast China had usually worked barefoot in the rice paddies with the others in their villages.

In medieval Europe, going barefoot or only wearing sandals (discalceation) was a mark of humility and piety among many mendicant orders of monks and nuns. At the same time, however, it was more generally seen as a mark of poverty, the very lowest social classes, and prisoners of war. In Imperial Japan, subordinates were sometimes required to remove their shoes in the presence of their superior as a mark of humility and respect.

Writing on Suriname in 1779, Brother Riemer remarked that slaves "are, even in their most beautiful suit, obliged to go barefoot. Slaves were forbidden to wear shoes. This was a prime mark of distinction between the free and the bonded and no exceptions were permitted." Similarly, the Cape Town slave code stated that "Slaves must go barefoot and must carry passes". This continues to be practice among the Tuareg in northern Africa.

In contemporary American society, going barefoot outdoors is so uncommon that the phrase "barefoot and pregnant" is generally understood to describe women kept unable to socialize or have a life outside the home. It was first used in the early 20th century.

=== Religious aspects ===
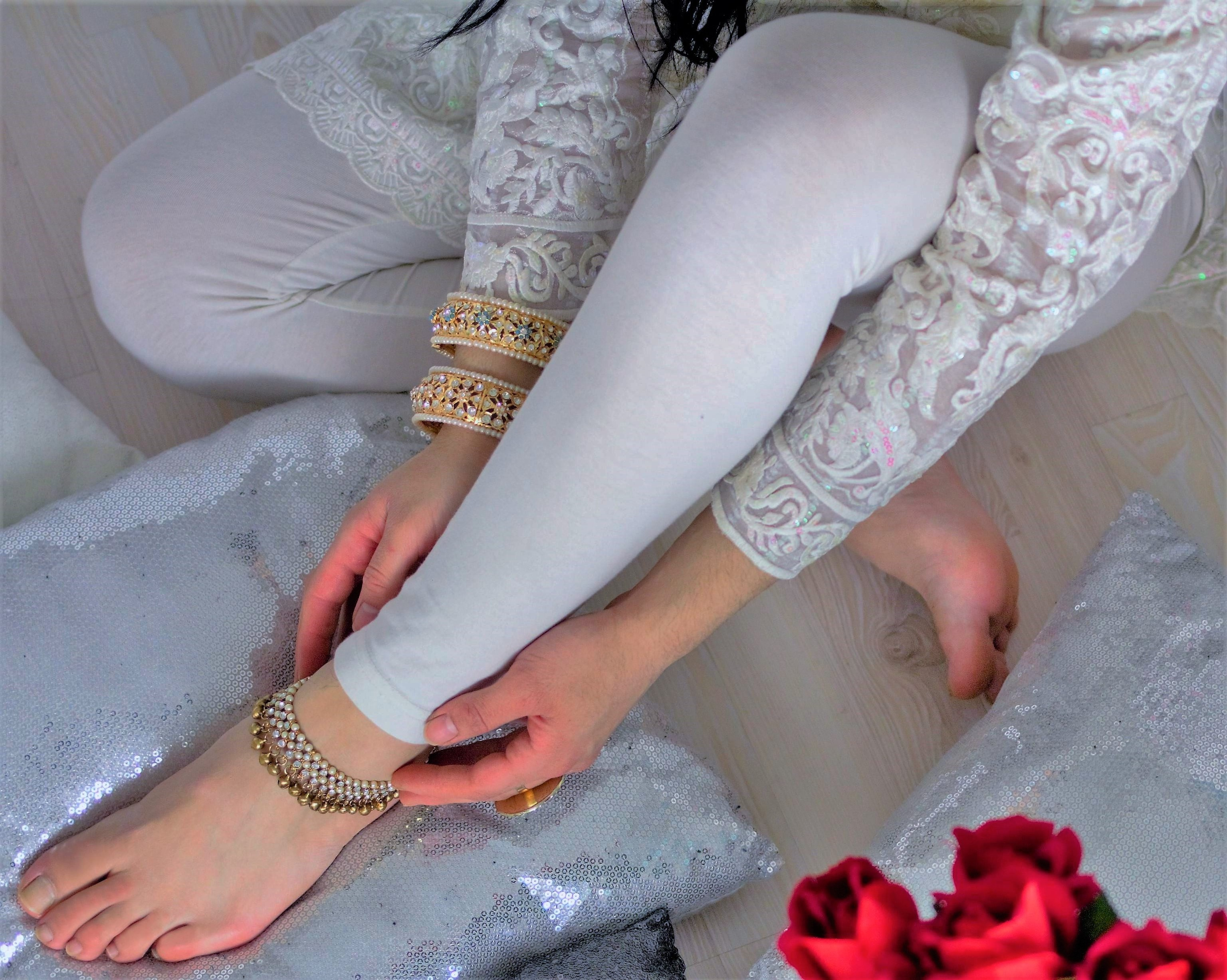
Barefoot woman wearing a cultural anklet, denoting her marital status in traditional Indian culture

Several major religions advocate or mandate the removal of footwear when entering a place considered holy. In the Book of Exodus, Moses is commanded to remove his shoes before approaching the burning bush:

Put off thy shoes from off thy feet, for the place whereon thou standest [is] holy ground (Exodus 3:5).

Although the Priestly Blessing is still done barefoot to preserve the former practice at the Temple of Solomon, it is not usually required to remove shoes at a Jewish synagogue. However, anyone entering an Islamic mosque or a Hindu temple is expected to remove their footwear. Shoe racks are usually provided near the entrance. In Christianity, most churches and holy sites can be entered wearing shoes but there are some local exceptions, such as the barefoot night ascent of Croagh Patrick in Ireland. The practice sometimes extends to secular respect as well. Raj Ghat, the monument to Mahatma Gandhi, is usually visited barefoot; this was observed by both US president George W. Bush and Pope John Paul II.

Discalceation, the practice of going constantly barefoot or clad only in sandals, is a common feature of Christian mendicant orders, practiced by the Discalced Carmelites (1568), the Feuillant Cistercians (1575), the Trinitarians (1594), the Mercedarians (1604), the Passionists, the Poor Clares and Colettine Poor Clares, and the Descalzas Reales. This is untaken as part of vows of poverty and humility, as well as a remembrance of Moses on Mount Sinai. Hindu gurus go barefoot to allow their followers to demonstrate their love and respect by pranam, the ceremonial touching of a bare foot.

It is customary in Judaism and some Christian denominations to go barefoot while mourning. The ceremonial washing of others' feet is done after the model of Jesus Christ in the New Testament, who washed the feet of his disciples at the Last Supper.

== Barefoot customs by country ==
=== Australia ===
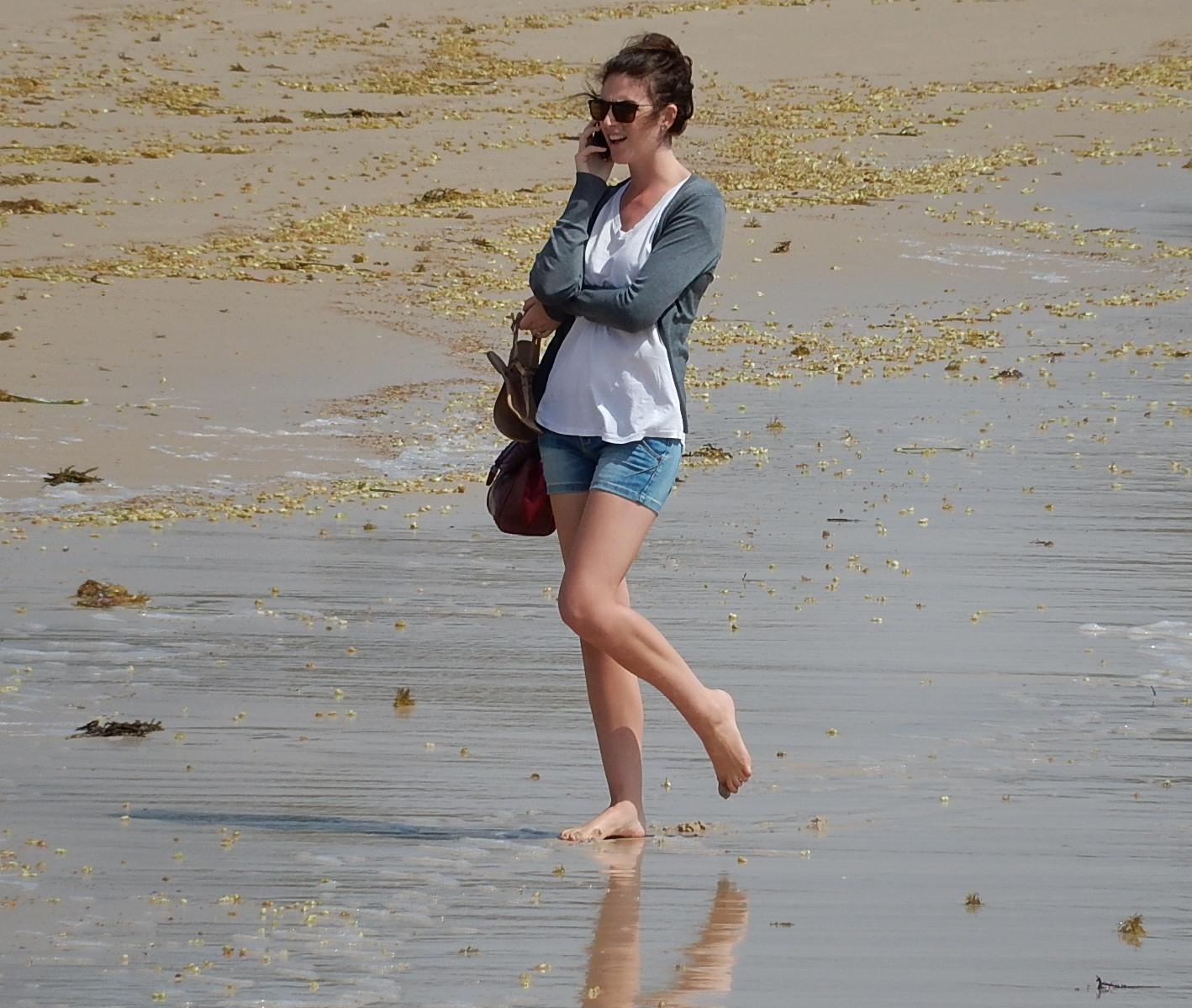
Barefoot woman in Glenelg, Adelaide

It is common for Australians, particularly young people, to be barefoot in public places, especially during summer.

Barefoot walking, known as "earthing", has been used by the Australian cricket team to "capture positive energy coming out of the earth."

=== Czech Republic ===
Tourist barefoot hikes are regularly organized every year. These events are organized by associations such as Bosá turistika.

=== Ecuador ===
Some Amerindian tribes such as the Huaorani live barefoot.

=== France ===
There is no law in France on the wearing of footwear for driving. Nevertheless, there are cases of cities that have made municipal by-laws prohibiting access to certain places while being barefoot for hygiene reasons.

During the opening ceremony of the 2024 Summer Paralympics, barefoot runner Alexis Guinet carried the torch to Laon.

=== Germany ===
Until the 1980s, it was common, especially in elementary schools, to allow students who had forgotten their sportswear or at least their sneakers to participate in physical education classes barefoot.

It is not expressly forbidden to drive barefoot, the German Highway Code simply states that the driver “is responsible for ensuring that his sight and hearing are not impaired by the crew, animals, load, equipment or the condition of the vehicle."

=== Japan ===
It is considered rude to wear shoes inside most residential buildings, and sometimes even at the workplace. For this reason, most Japanese houses are fit with a genkan, a small room at the entrance where residents and guests can change into slippers or similar indoor footwear.

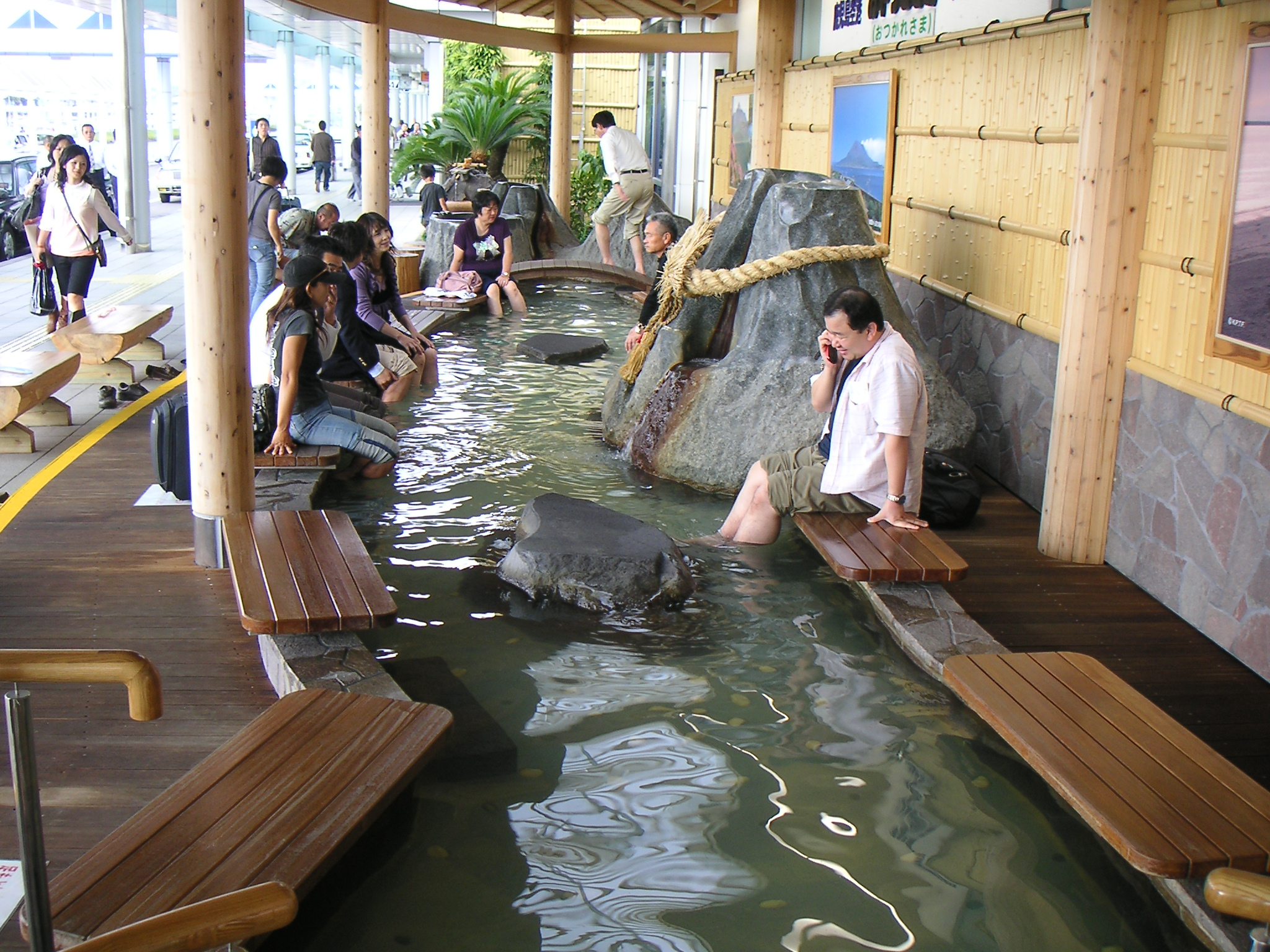
An ashiyu foot spa at Kagoshima Airport in Japan

In Japan, there are public foot baths called ashiyu, which are filled with hot water from geothermal springs.

=== India ===
In Indian culture, in many an instance, being barefoot has a cultural significance. For example, it is customary to remove footwear when entering a home or a temple as shoes are considered impure. Indians also traditionally sit on the floor when eating meals as opposed to at a dining table, which would normally entail taking off footwear.

=== New Zealand ===
It is common in New Zealand to see people walking barefoot in the street.

In 2010, an American academic missed a high-level academic post because of a letter she wrote to the New Zealand magazine Listener lamenting New Zealand’s habit of going barefoot in public: she described the practice as “not only backward and uncivilized, but dangerously unhygienic and repugnant to North Americans”.

In 2012, a travel writer for The New York Times wrote the number of New Zealanders barefoot in public, including shops was "striking". In 2014, Air New Zealand was subject of critical attention after allegedly forcing a customer to wear shoes.

=== Romani ===
In many branches of Romani culture across the world, it is traditional for women to dance barefoot.

=== Spain ===
In Spain, driving barefoot or with flip-flops is not illegal, but drivers found to be impaired in their freedom of movement or control of the vehicle by lack of proper footwear may be fined up to €200.

=== South Africa ===
In South Africa, barefoot walking in public is part of the predominantly white Afrikaans-speaking culture, although English speaking people also often walk barefoot in public, especially in the summer months and in cities such as Cape Town. The National Guidelines on School Uniform list shoes as an optional item while the Draft Guidelines state "Pupils, especially in lower grades, should also be permitted to attend without shoes in hot weather". Most children attend school barefoot. In many schools, the dress codes either encourage children to attend school barefoot or prefer children to attend school barefoot, especially in the summer months.

Some South African schools have sport uniforms where bare feet are compulsory, such as primary school rugby. Another sport where bare feet for kids are compulsory is "tou trek" or tug of war, sometimes school play and sports days barefeet are compulsory. Being barefoot in public is generally tolerated. In South African shopping malls, stores, and events, it is not an uncommon sight to see barefoot adults and children.

=== United States ===
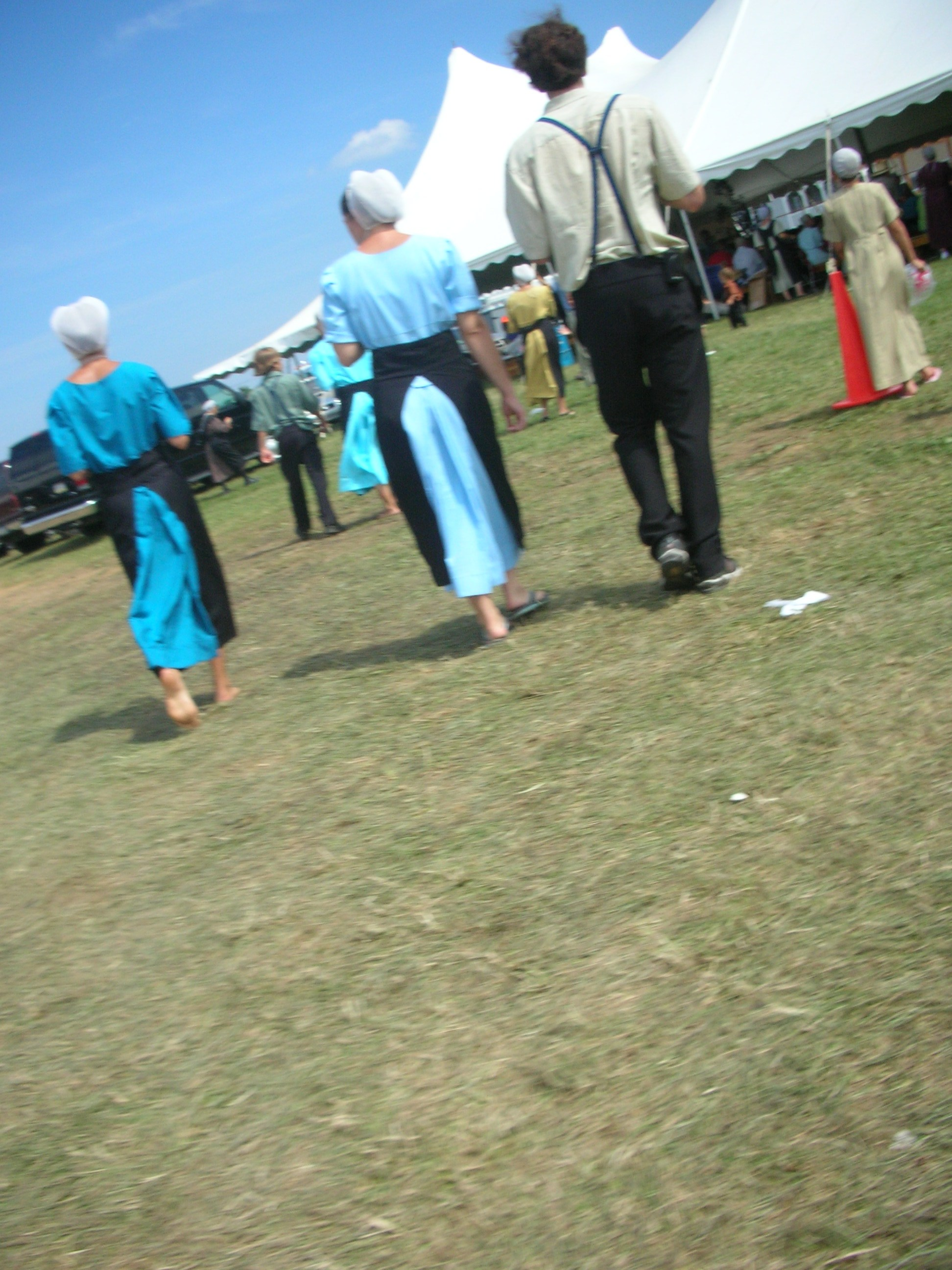
Barefoot Amish

In some parts of the United States, taboos against barefoot walking are strong. Youngstown, Ohio, actually had an ordinance prohibiting barefooting until it was struck down as unconstitutional. However, in the 18th to the early 20th centuries, many children in rural areas of America often went barefoot due to poverty.

It is legal to drive a car barefoot in the United States, but it depends on the state and it is not the case for motorcycles. Amish women are usually barefooted when at their house and farm.

In some social circles, walking barefoot serves as part of bohemian hippie fashion.

=== Vietnam ===
In the province of Tuyen Quang, in northern Vietnam, the Pa Then ethnic group organizes a ritual during which men dance barefoot on embers. The purpose of this dance is to exorcise demons and get good harvests.

== Arts and entertainment ==
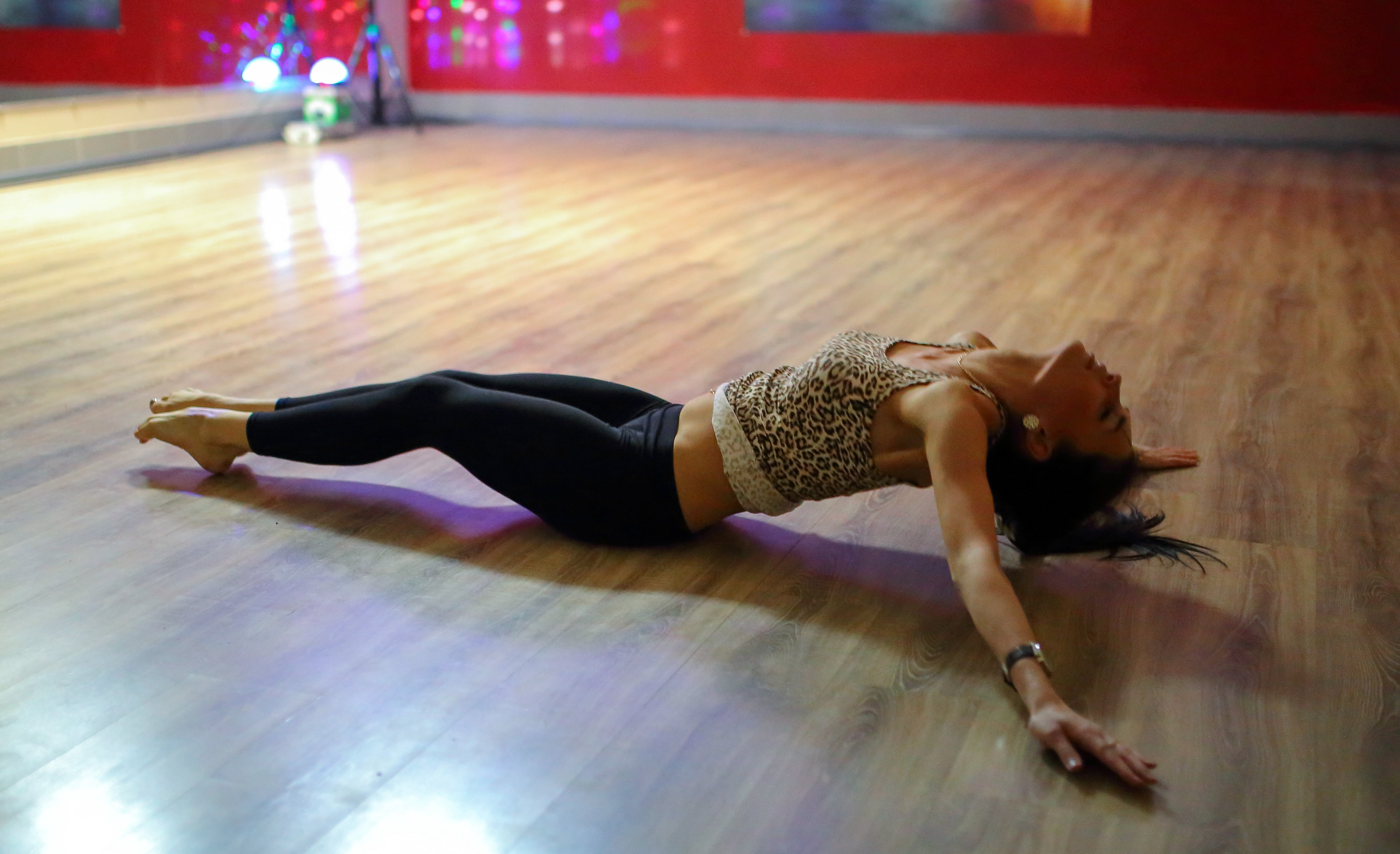
A barefoot woman in a dance studio

Many singers and dancers perform on stage barefoot. The classical dance of Cambodia had its roots in the holy dances of the legendary seductresses (apsaras) of ancient Cambodia and attained its high point during the Angkor period in its interpretations of the Indian epics, especially the Ramayana. Cambodian dancers were well-born women of the king's harem and danced barefoot, with the feet turned outwards and the legs slightly bent at the knee to cushion the movements of the upper body. The unimpeded movement of the foot was essential to the art. When the land was invaded by the Thai, the dancers were taken to the Thai court, where their art was adapted and continued to flourish.

The barefoot dance movement of the early 20th century challenged the received laws of classical dance and the broader laws of social decorum. For decades, the bare foot had been perceived as obscene, and no matter how determined barefoot dancers were to validate their art with reference to spiritual, artistic, historic, and organic concepts, barefoot dancing was inextricably linked in the public mind with indecency and sexual taboo. In 1908, Maud Allan shocked and fascinated London theatre-goers with her barefoot dance of desire in Salome, and scandalous tributes positioned her as the embodiment of lust. For many, barefoot dancing represented not only the freedom and horror of modern sexuality but the progress and decline of high culture.

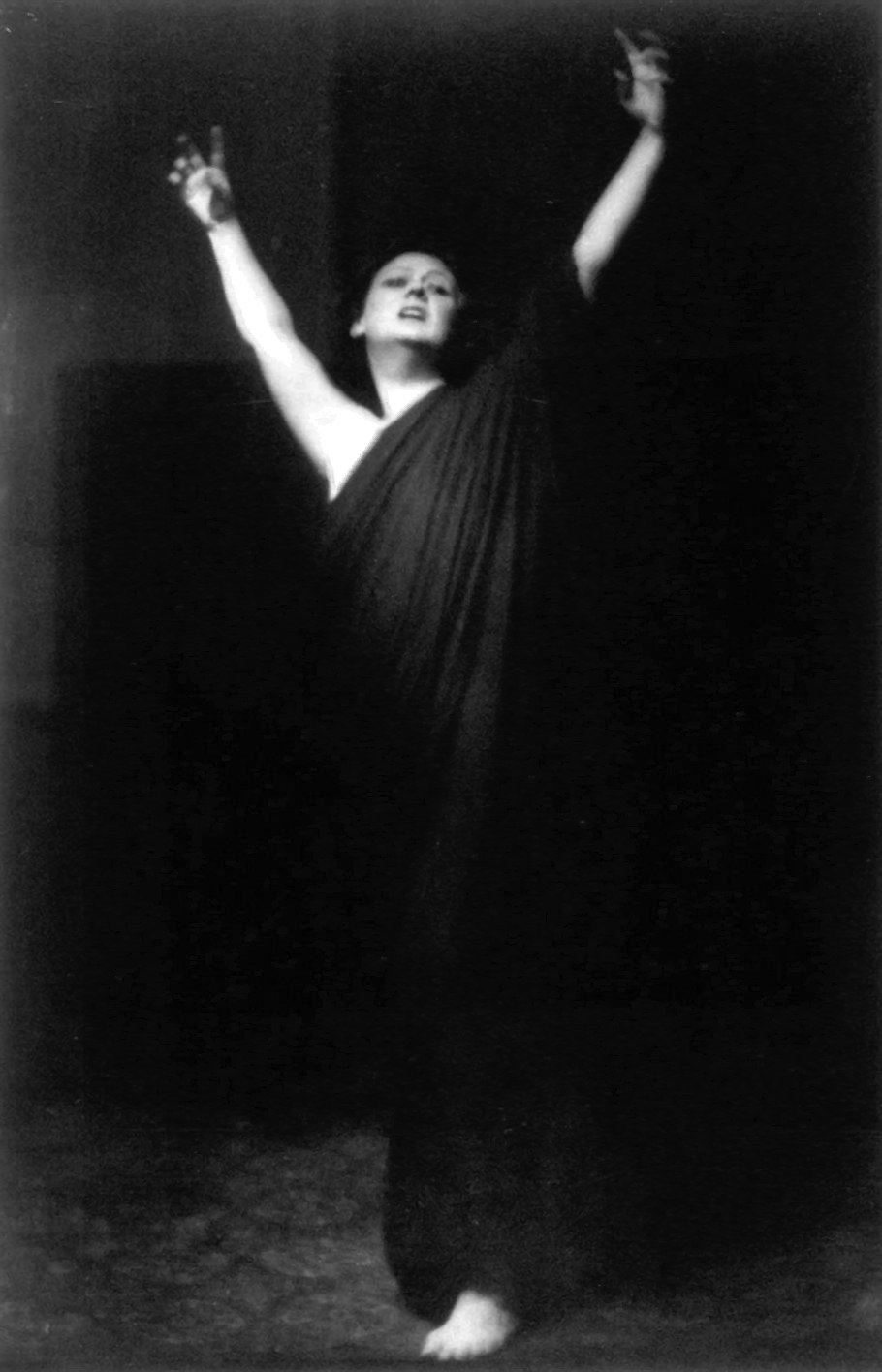
Dancer Isadora Duncan performing barefoot during her 1915–18 American tour

Californian Isadora Duncan revolutionized dance in the Western world by jettisoning the tutu and the pointe shoe of classical ballet and scandalized audiences by performing works of her own choreography in flowing draperies and bare feet. She anticipated the modern women's liberation movement by urging women to rid themselves of corsets and matrimony. Duncan divorced the bare foot from perceptions of obscenity and made a conscious effort to link barefoot dancing to ideals such as "nudity, childhood, the idyllic past, flowing lines, health, nobility, ease, freedom, simplicity, order, and harmony". She believed her utopian dance vision and program would ameliorate the perceived ills of modern life and restore the world to the imagined perfection of Ancient Greece.

The 1954 film The Barefoot Contessa tells the fictional story of Maria Vargas (portrayed by Ava Gardner), a Spanish cabaret dancer of simple origins who frequently went barefoot. She was cast in a movie by writer and director Harry Dawes (portrayed by Humphrey Bogart) and became a major star. In 1978, Ina Garten purchased a specialty food store in The Hamptons named Barefoot Contessa, after the movie. She liked the name because it went well with her simple and elegant cooking style. She sold the store in 1999 and wrote her first book, The Barefoot Contessa Cookbook, which became one of the best-selling cookbooks of the year. She would go on to write more cookbooks and, in 2002, started production of a television show on the Food Network, also named the Barefoot Contessa, which continues to run.

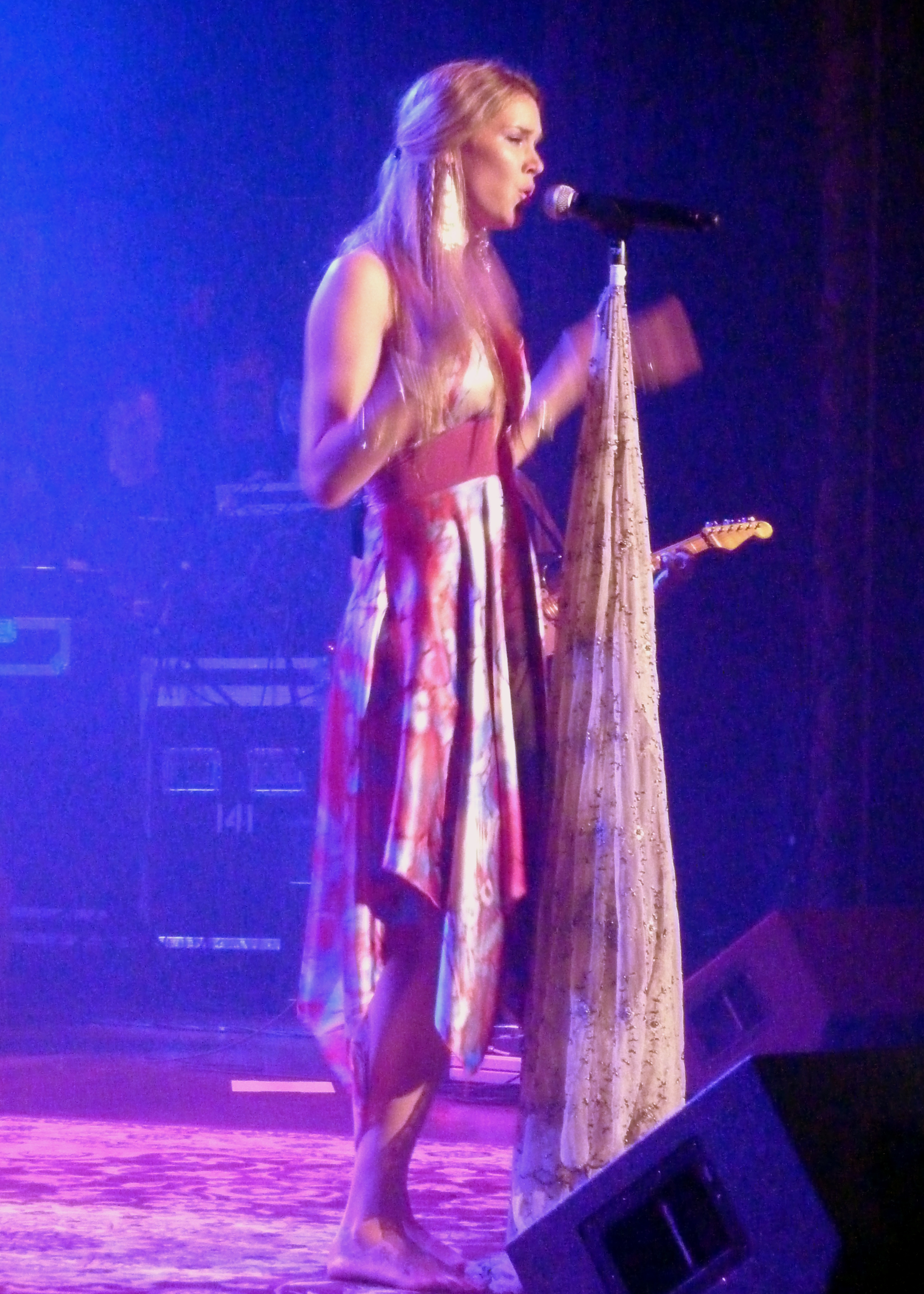
Singer Joss Stone performing barefoot on stage

In the latter half of the 20th century, many singers, primarily women, have performed barefoot, a trend that continues in the early 21st century. One of the first singers to become well known for singing barefoot on stage was Sandie Shaw, who became known as the "Barefoot Pop Princess of the 1960s". Jimmy Buffett was known for performing barefoot at concerts, promoting an island/beach bum lifestyle. Cesária Évora of Cape Verde was known as the "Barefoot Diva" for her habit of performing without shoes. British singer Joss Stone is well known for performing barefoot and was referred to as a "barefoot diva" by The Guardian in 2004.

At the Coachella Valley Music and Arts Festival, some attendees go barefoot on the grass ground, sometimes for fashion. Celebrities who have gone barefoot at the festival include Vanessa Hudgens, Isabel Lucas, Alessandra Ambrosio, Gigi Hadid and Ashley Benson.

== Health implications ==
There are risks and benefits associated with going barefoot. Footwear provides some protection from puncture wounds from glass, nails, rocks, or thorns as well as abrasions, bruises, heat burns, electrical shock, and frostbite. But feet that have never worn shoes rarely exhibit problems such as bunions, corns, and "fallen arches", are not prone to more than ordinary foot eversion on standing and walking due to the associated weakness or stiffness of the joints of the foot and weakness of the muscles controlling them, as well as having a much reduced incidence of problems such as callouses.

Walking barefoot results in a more natural gait. People who are used to walking barefoot tend to land less forcefully, eliminating the hard heel strike and generating much less collision force in the foot and lower leg, allowing for a rocking motion of the foot from heel to toe. Similarly, barefoot running usually involves an initial forefoot strike, instead of on the rear of the foot, generating smaller collision forces. A 2006 study found that shoes may increase stress on the knee and ankle, and suggested that adults who walked barefoot may have a lower rate of osteoarthritis, although more study is required to elucidate the factors that distribute loads in shod and barefoot walking. A 2007 study examined 180 modern humans and compared their feet with 2,000-year-old skeletons. They concluded that, before the invention of shoes, humans overall had healthier feet. A 1991 study found that children who wore shoes were three times more likely to have flat feet than those who did not, and suggested that wearing shoes in early childhood can be detrimental to the longitudinal arch of the foot. Children who habitually go barefoot were found to have stronger feet, with better flexibility and mobility, fewer deformities like flat feet or toes that curve inwards, and fewer complaints.

Since there is no artificial protection of the bare foot, some of the possible issues include cuts, abrasions, bruises, or puncture wounds from glass, nails, rocks, or thorns, as well as poisonous plants, animals, or parasites that can enter the body through the cuts on an injured bare foot. In people who are not habitually barefoot, athlete's foot is spread by fungal spores coming into contact with skin that has been weakened and made moist. The fungus is known to only affect around 0.75% of habitually barefoot people in one study and can be prevented by reducing shoe use and keeping the feet dry, particularly after walking through a damp environment where people communally walk barefoot as the fungus only develops under the right conditions, such as when people fail to properly dry their feet after swimming or showering and then put on shoes. Wearing shoes such as flip flops or sandals in these areas can reduce the risk.

The hookworm parasite, found in warm, moist climates where human feces contaminated with hookworm larvae has been left in places where it might come into contact with human skin, can burrow through a bare human foot (or any part of the body that comes into contact with it). The parasite may spread through contaminated material coming into contact with any part of the body, such as through flecks of mud splashing on an ankle or leg.

Issues that can develop as a result of someone who has always worn shoes going barefoot include calf pain or Achilles tendinitis or plantar fasciitis due to shortening of the Achilles tendon and the foot being underdeveloped, due to regular use of shoes. A careful transition eases or removes symptoms, which quickly vanish as the foot adapts. Blisters on the feet may occur in the first few weeks of going barefoot, until the skin has become more robust. Individuals with diabetes or other conditions that affect sensation in the feet are at greater risk of injury while barefoot. The American Diabetes Association recommends that diabetics wear shoes and socks at all times.

== Laws ==
In the United States, there have been myths that regulations require the wearing of footwear. In the United States, during the period of the counterculture movement of the 1960s, business establishments would deny admittance to barefoot hippies arguing that health regulations required that shoes be worn. This led to a belief by many in nonexistent Occupational Safety and Health Administration (OSHA) or local health department regulations preventing people from going to stores, restaurants, and other establishments without shoes. However, those regulations that exist apply only to employees and not customers. Specifically, the United States OSHA requires employers to "ensure that each affected employee uses protective footwear" when there is a danger of foot injuries due to falling or rolling objects, objects piercing the sole of an employee's foot, and where an employee's feet may be exposed to electrical hazards. Additionally, employee footwear, where required by OSHA, must comply with one of the standards described in OSHA's regulations. State and local laws may dictate when and where an employee must wear shoes.

Some people speculate that driving barefoot increases the risk of an accident if bare feet slip off the pedals. It is legal throughout the United States, Canada, and the United Kingdom to drive barefoot. However, in some US jurisdictions, police officers may ticket a driver for other things if the fact that they were driving barefoot or in flip-flops/high heeled shoes hindered their driving and/or resulted in an accident. Driving barefoot may also potentially be used in the case of an accident to put the driver more at fault.

== Sports and recreation ==
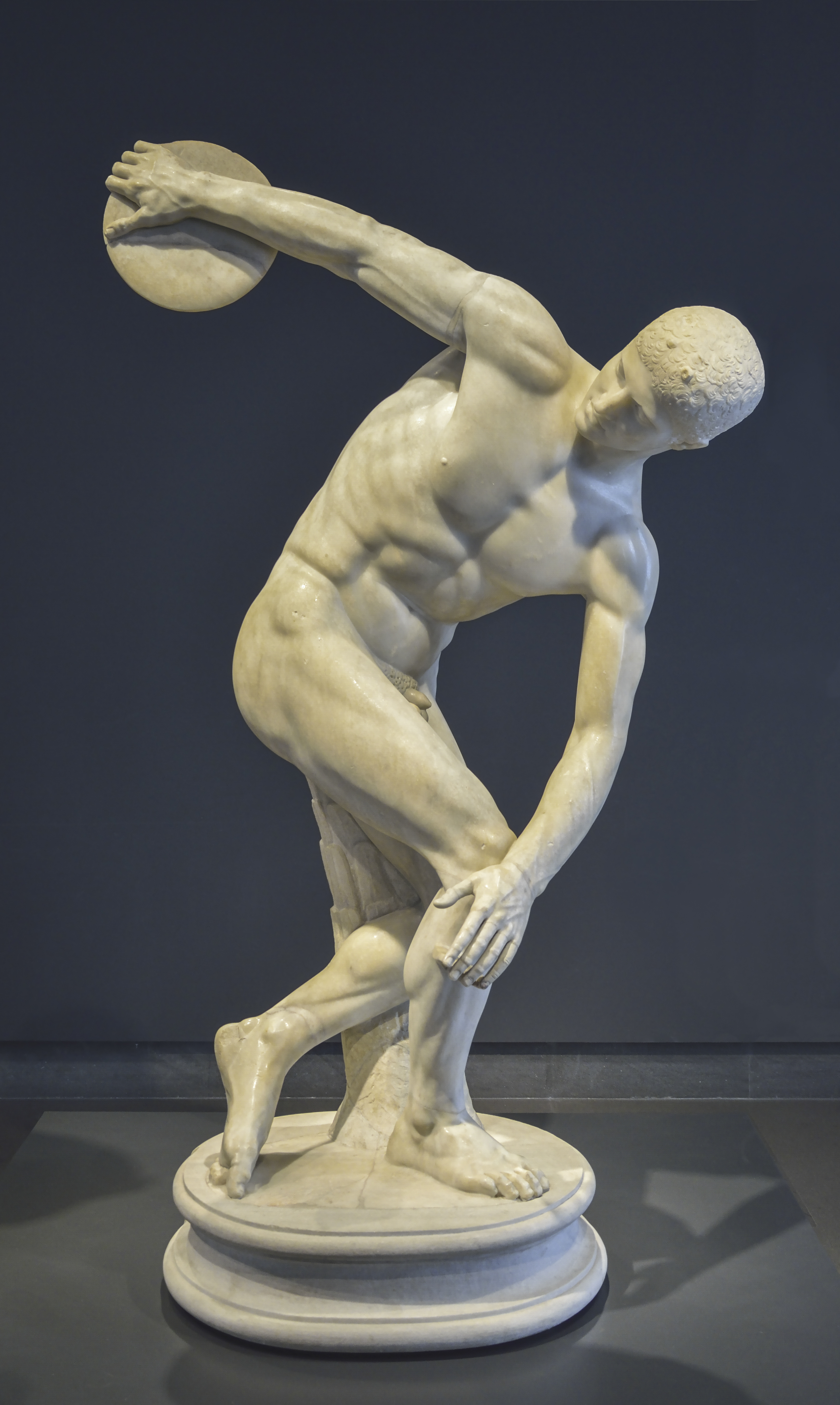
Ancient Olympic discus thrower

There are several recreational activities one can participate in while barefoot. Those involved in water sports such as swimming and water polo almost always participate barefoot due to the difficulty of swimming with footwear.

Other common activities performed barefoot include yoga, pilates, hiking, running, driving, water skiing, touch rugby, soccer, beach volleyball, surfing, tubing, gymnastics, slacklining, and martial arts. Wrestling can be done barefoot. Although most modern Greco-Roman and WWE wrestlers wear shoes, sumo wrestling, Yağlı güreş (oil or "Turkish" wrestling), and mud wrestling are commonly done while barefoot. Fijian wrestler Jimmy "Superfly" Snuka of the WWE has wrestled barefoot as well. American football is not traditionally a barefoot sport, though several placekickers have preferred to kick barefoot, including Tony Franklin of the Philadelphia Eagles and Rich Karlis of the Denver Broncos. The two schools of thought involved in barefoot placekicking were that the lack of a shoe provided the kicker with a better "feel" for the ball and greater control over its trajectory. The second theory is that shoes and socks absorbed kinetic energy, and kicking flesh-to-leather created more torque.

=== Hiking ===
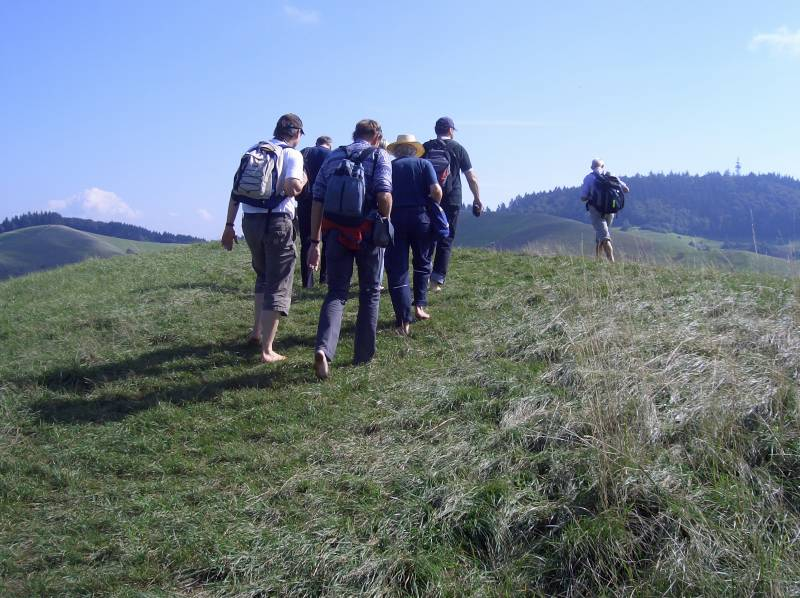
Barefoot hiking

Barefoot hikers assert that they feel a sense of communion with the earth and enjoy the sheer pleasure of feeling more of the world with their feet. There are several clubs throughout North America practicing regular barefoot hikes, including the Barefoot Hikers of Minnesota, Seattle Barefoot Hikers, East Bay Barefoot Hikers, the Barefoot Hikers and Grass Walkers of Greater Kansas City, and the Barefoot Hikers of Connecticut. This is in part also undertaken to be reminiscent of former slaves, who were often forced to remain barefoot at all times (see above). Two sisters, Lucy and Susan Letcher, hiked approximately two-thirds of the 2,175-mile (3,500 km) Appalachian Trail barefoot from June 21, 2000, to October 3, 2001. On November 12, 2010, 2,500 people in Mahabubnagar, India, participated in a barefoot walk, which was recognized by Guinness World Records as the world's largest.

In European nations, including Austria, Denmark, France, Germany, Hungary, Italy, Switzerland, and the United Kingdom, there are barefoot parks or walks. These parks are kept clean and maintained on a regular basis, so that barefoot hiking can be done in an environment suitable for people who are habitually shod. Barefoot parks usually include a lot of adventure stations, allowing visitors to experience the feeling of soil textures underfoot; to wade through rivers, mud, brooks, or ponds; and to exercise foot gymnastics, balancing, and climbing. The Barfußpfad (barefoot trail) at Bad Sobernheim in Germany attracts over 100,000 visitors annually and has seen approximately 1 million visitors since its inception in 1999.

This concept was first developed in the 19th century by Sebastian Kneipp, one of the founders of the Naturopathic medicine movement. He believed that applying your feet to a range of natural stimuli would have therapeutic benefits. This is related to the ancient practice of reflexology, practiced in China for thousands of years for relaxation and to promote longevity.

Seoul, South Korea, has 158 barefoot parks, allowing people to relax in a natural environment.

=== Running ===
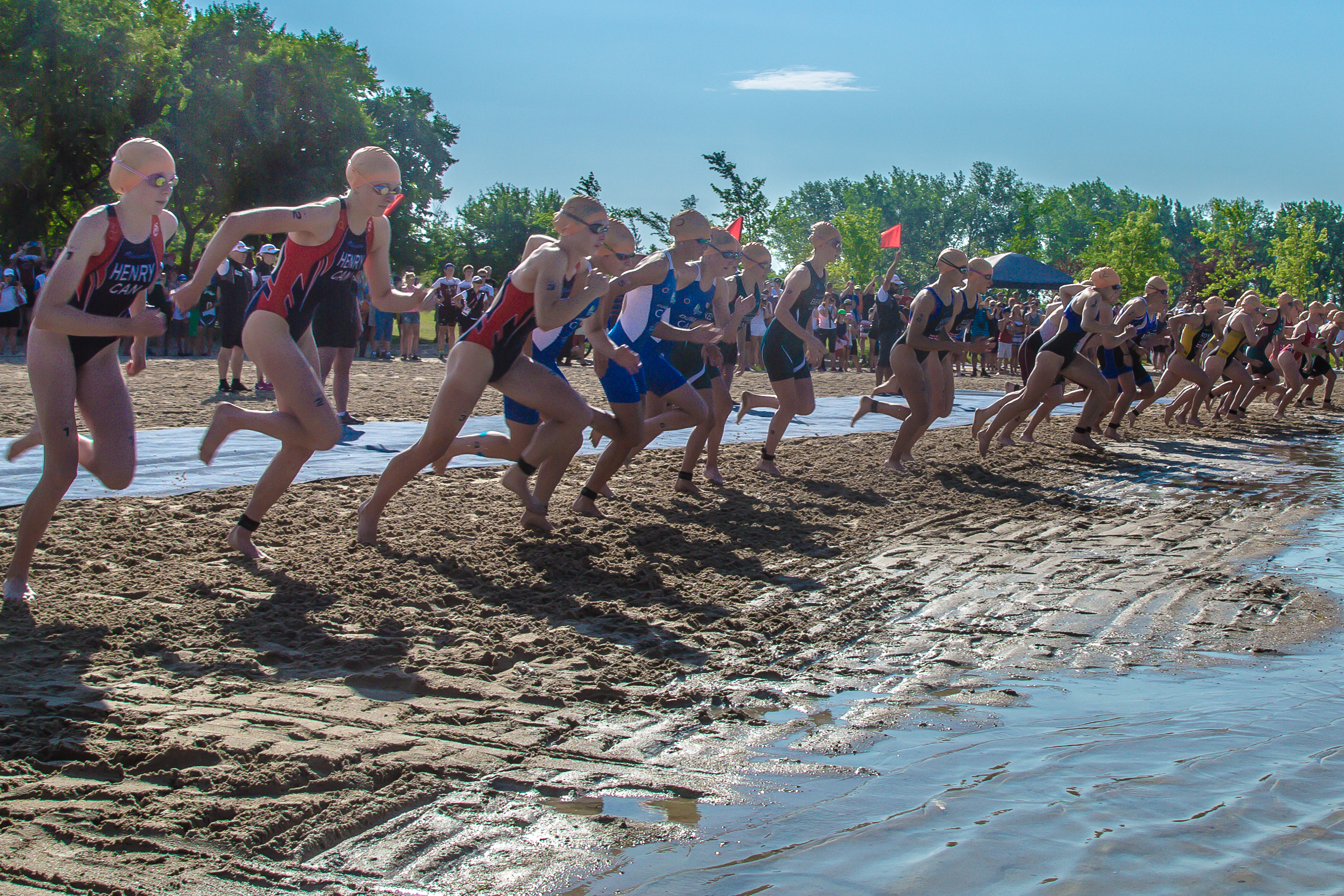
Barefoot running

Many leisure and competitive runners have been known to run barefoot, including well-known athletes Zola Budd of South Africa and Abebe Bikila of Ethiopia. Todd Ragsdale, of Talent, Oregon, set the world record (pending confirmation by Guinness World Records) for the longest distance run barefoot on June 5, 2010, as part of the Relay for Life fundraiser for the American Cancer Society. He logged 102 miles (164 km), or 413 laps on the South Medford High School track, barefoot. The fastest person to run 100 meters (325 feet) on ice while barefoot is Nico Surings of Eindhoven, Netherlands, who ran that distance in 17.35 seconds on December 8, 2006. Laboratory studies suggest that, due to the lack of extra weight on the feet, the energy cost of running barefoot is reduced by 4%, resulting in lower oxygen consumption. There is evidence that wearing traditional shoes while running leads to heel strike gait that, in turn, leads to higher impact as well as a greater risk of injury. Barefoot running encourages the runner to switch to forefoot strike and may reduce the risk of knee damage.

Barefoot running can be dangerous, especially to runners who do not adequately prepare or give their feet time to adapt to the new style. Many injuries are possible, such as injuries to the Achilles tendon or plantar fascia, or stress fractures in the metatarsal bones or lower leg. Barefoot runners who do not prepare their bodies could provide, "a stimulus plan for podiatrists, orthopedists, and physical therapists".

The official position on barefoot running by the American Podiatric Medical Association states that there is not enough research on the immediate- and long-term benefits of the practice and that individuals should consult a podiatrist with a strong background in sports medicine to make an informed decision on all aspects of their running and training programs.

One alternative to barefoot running is to wear thin-soled shoes with minimal padding, such as moccasins, plimsolls, or huaraches, which result in similar gait to going barefoot but protect the skin and keep dirt and water off. Some modern shoe manufacturers have designed footwear to maintain optimum flexibility while providing a minimum amount of protection. Such shoes include the shoes made by Vibram FiveFingers, Vivobarefoot, and Nike's Nike Free shoes. Sales of minimalist running shoes have grown into a US$1.7 billion industry. Sales of Vibram FiveFingers alone grew from US$450,000 in 2006 to US$50 million in 2011.

=== Water skiing ===
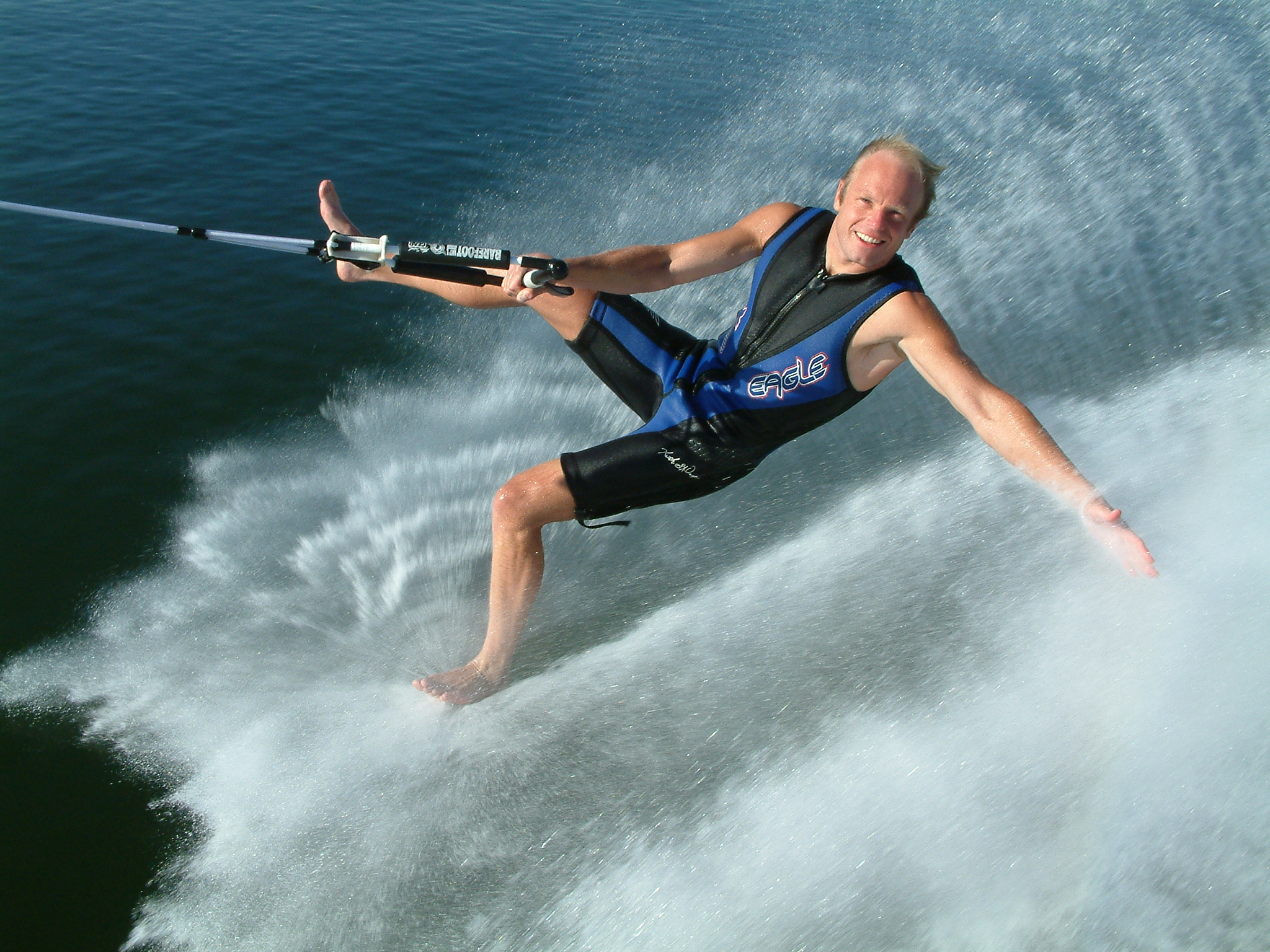
A barefoot skier

Barefoot skiing originated in Winter Haven, Florida, in 1947, when slalom skier A.G. Hancock tried to step off his ski. The same year, in Cypress Gardens, Florida, competitive skier Richard Downing Pope, Jr., became well known in the sport of barefoot skiing. The first barefoot skiing competition was held three years later, at the 1950 Cypress Gardens Dixie Championships. In 1978, skiers from ten nations competed in the first World Barefoot Championships in Canberra, Australia. The same year, the American Barefoot Club (ABC) was formed, which governs competitive barefoot skiing events in the United States.

=== Skateboarding ===
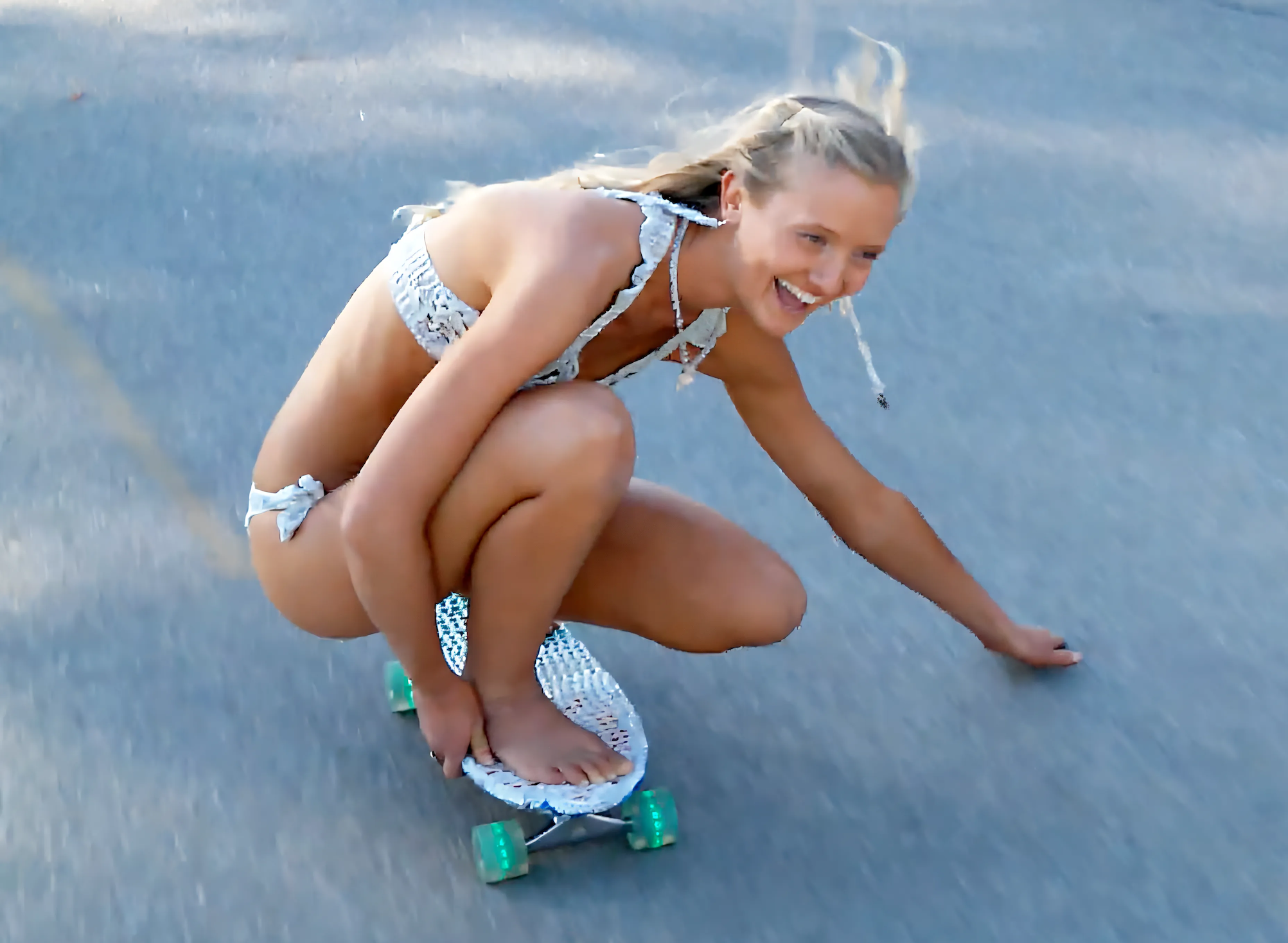
Barefoot skateboarding

Early skateboarders rode barefoot, preferring foot-to-board contact and emulating surfing moves. The plastic penny board is intended to be ridden barefoot, and Penny Skateboards have promoted the riding of the board barefoot by selling T-shirts and stickers. They have also posted social media posts encouraging barefoot riding, particularly in summer. The Hamboard, a surfboard style board, is also intended to be ridden barefoot. Barefoot skateboarding has been witnessing a revival in recent times. Many modern skateboarders skate barefoot, especially in summer and in warmer countries like Australia, South Africa, and parts of South America.

=== Combat sports ===
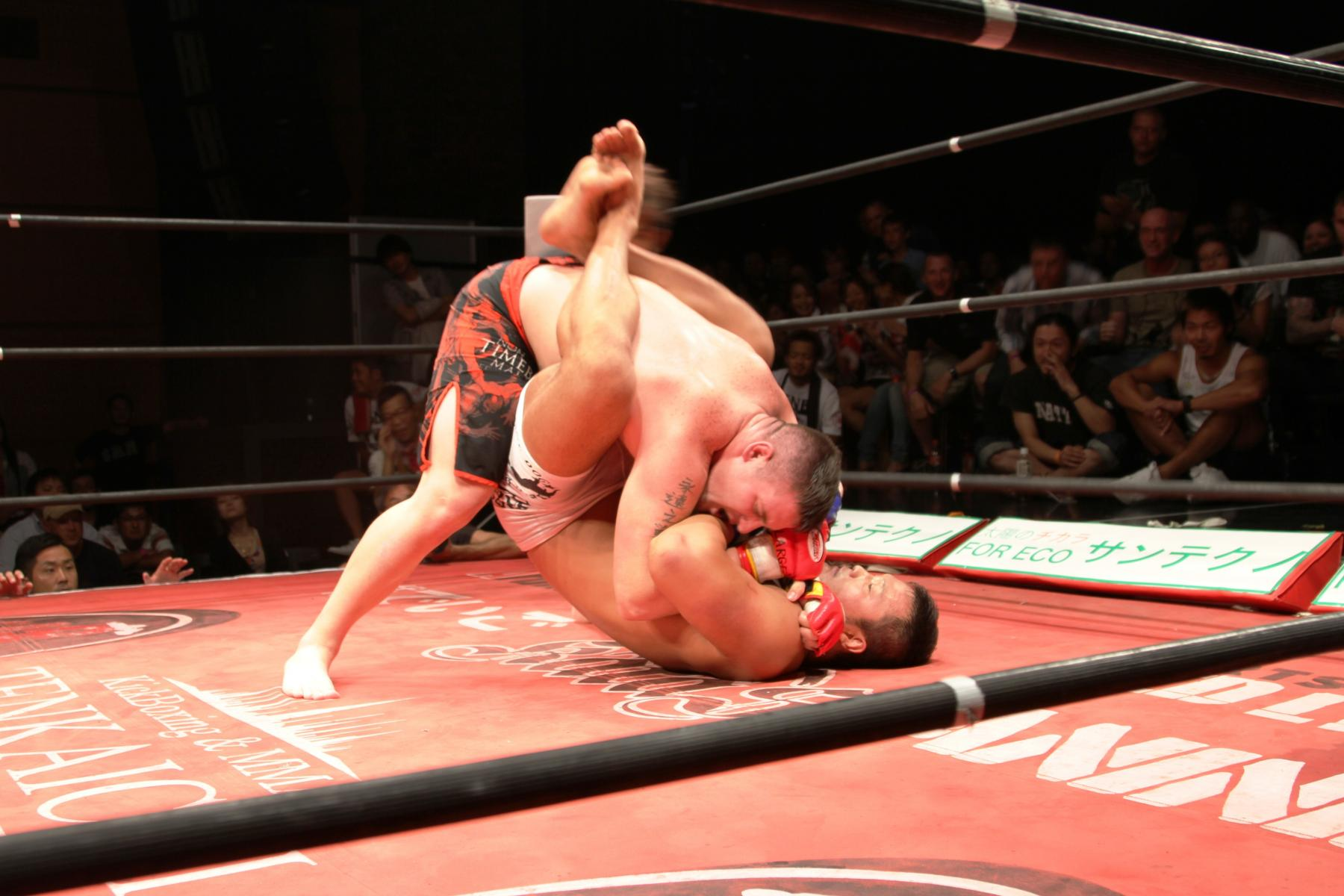
Barefoot martial arts

It is typically mandatory to compete barefoot in combat sports which allow kicking such as mixed martial arts. In contrast, competitors usually wear shoes in boxing and other disciplines where kicking or similar offensive use of the legs and feet are not permitted.

=== American football ===
Until the 1980s, a significant minority of placekickers in American football competed barefoot, although a "barefoot" kicker always wore a shoe on his non-kicking foot. Some kickers believed they could get a better "feel" for the ball and thus have greater control over the ball's trajectory. Another theory was that shoes and socks absorbed kinetic energy, and kicking barefoot would create more torque. A major drawback was the increased risk of injuring the kicking foot (a toe injury in particular had the potential to be season-ending) although the adoption of the "soccer-style" kicking motion starting in the late 1960s (in addition to being proven a much more accurate kicking method) reduced the risk of toe injuries compared to kicking the ball toe-first.

Barefoot kicking decisively fell out of favor during the 1990s as new materials and technology in cleat design enabled shoe manufacturers to develop kicking footwear specifically for American football, based on successful designs of soccer cleats. One design was described as a cross between a soccer cleat and a ballet shoe.

One of the more well known barefoot kickers was Tony Franklin, who played for the Philadelphia Eagles and the Miami Dolphins between 1979 and 1988. He remains the all time scoring leader for barefoot kickers with 872 points. The last full-time barefoot kicker in the NFL was Rich Karlis of the Denver Broncos, who played until the 1990 NFL season. The last barefoot field goal was a kick by Jeff Wilkins on October 20, 2002. Wilkins, who only kicked barefoot for the first seven games of the 2002 season, retired after the 2007 season.

== See also ==
- List of barefooters
- Sole (foot)
- Ötzi
- Barefoot doctor
- Barefoot in the Park (film)
- Colton Harris-Moore (also known as the "Barefoot Bandit")
