= Huarache (shoe) =

Traditional sandal of Mexico

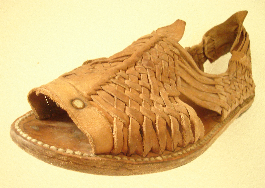
A modern-day huarache

Huaraches (singular huarache Spanish pronunciation: [waˈɾatʃe]; derived from warachi in Purépecha) are a type of Mexican sandal, Pre-Columbian in origin.

== History ==
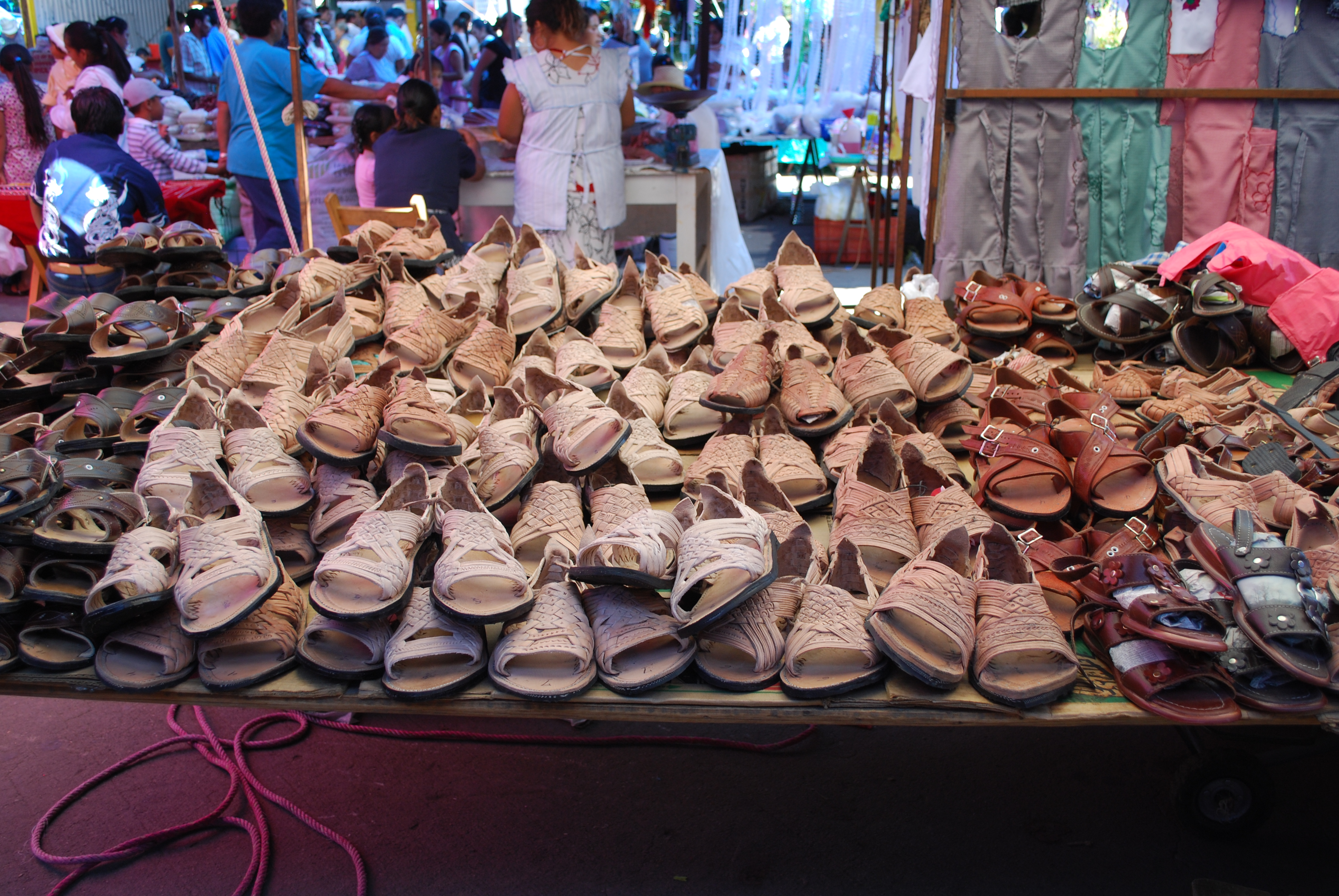
Huaraches for sale in Oaxaca

The sandals are believed related to the cactle or cactli, of Náhuatl origin. The name "huarache" is derived from the Purépecha language term kwarachi, and directly translates into English as sandal.

Early forms have been found in and traced to the countryside farming communities of Jalisco, Michoacan, Guanajuato and Yucatan. Originally of all-leather construction, the thong structure around the main foot is still traditionally made with hand-woven braided leather straps.

Huaraches gained popularity in North America as part of the 1960s hippie lifestyle. By the end of the 20th century they were to be found all over North and South America.

== Styles ==
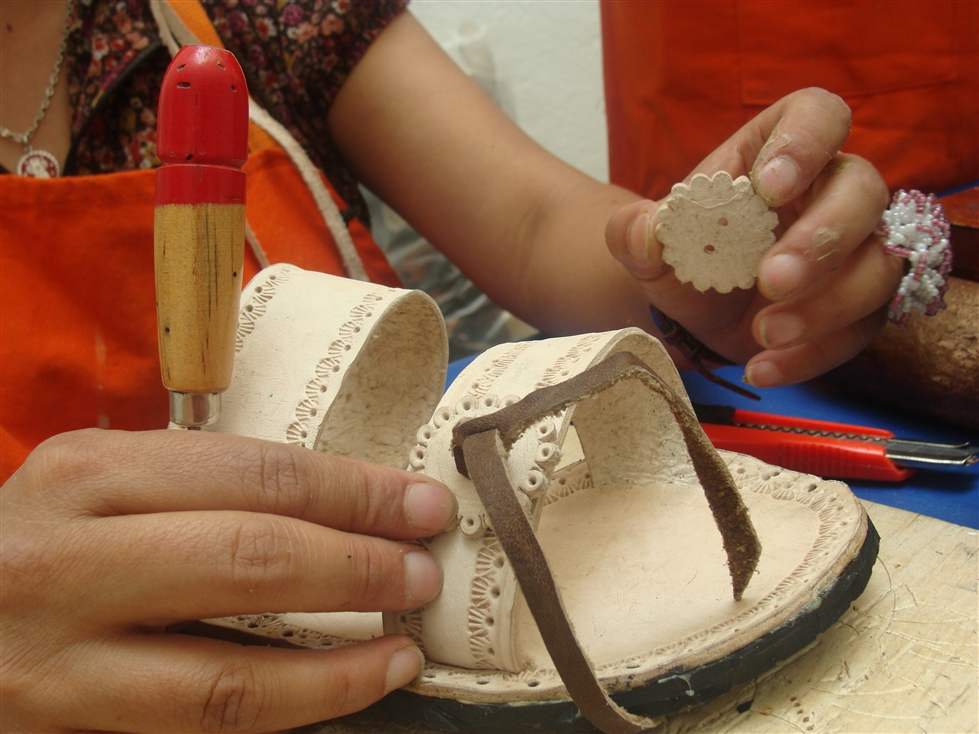
Making a huarache sandal at a workshop at the Museo de Arte Popular, Mexico City

Traditional huarache designs vary greatly, but are always very simple. Originally made of all-leather, later designs included woven string soles and occasionally thin wooden soles. Subsequently, more elaborate upper designs were created by saddlers and leather workers.

The modern huarache developed from the adoption in the 1930s of making soles by recycling used rubber from automotive tires. Modern designs vary in style from a simplistic sandal to a more complex shoe, using both traditional leather as well as more modern synthetic materials.

Many shoes claim to be huaraches, but they are only considered traditional huaraches if they are handmade, and have a woven-leather form in the upper.

== Media ==
Huaraches are mentioned in the lyrics of the Beach Boys songs "Surfin' U.S.A." and "Noble Surfer", in the novel Ask the Dust, written by John Fante (Camilla Lopez's shoes), and also in the novel On the Road, written by Jack Kerouac. Huaraches figure prominently in the title and plot of the 1964 Looney Tunes cartoon short, Señorella and the Glass Huarache, a Mexican-themed adaptation of the Cinderella fairy tale. Skeeter Phelan wears a pair of the shoes, which her traditionalist Southern mother hates, in the Kathryn Stockett novel The Help. Doc Sportello, the detective from Thomas Pynchon's Inherent Vice, wears a pair of huaraches. He eventually loses one shoe and finishes the adventure using only the other one. In the Seinfeld season 8 episode "The Millennium" Elaine Benes attempts to buy a pair of huaraches from an uninterested shop owner.

== Cultural significance ==
While huaraches originated in various regions in Mexico, they hold great significance in Chicano populations. For Chicanos, huaraches were more than just a shoe. The sandal held cultural significance for participants of the Chicano Movement, specifically those who attended university. They were “a sign of resistance and affirmation of one’s culture”. A symbol of poverty, Chicanos reclaimed the shoe to represent their pride for the Mexican heritage. In addition, huaraches were an outlet for Chicanos to express their cultural identity and reject the American culture that aimed to erase their ethnic history. Along with huaraches, Chicanos would wear other traditional Mexican garments such as rebozos, ponchos, and huipil dresses.

In the present day, huaraches remain an important symbol and staple of Mexican culture. But the rise in popularity of Mexican culture has resulted in the mass-production of the shoes to accommodate for the high demand. This has led to some vendors taking advantage of Mexican producers of the shoes. This is done in several different ways. Some vendors choose to buy the product at the source (Mexico) at a low cost and re-sell the shoe in America at an increased price without giving any credit to the people creating the shoes. Others choose to utilize imported artificial materials. There are still vendors that focus on keeping the materials authentic, import from Mexico, and strive to pay their Mexican workers living wages, giving them more opportunities for expanding their business.

In August 2025, Mexican authorities accused sportswear company Adidas of plagiarizing artisans in southern Mexico, alleging that a new sandal design is strikingly similar to the traditional Indigenous footwear known as huaraches. Nike has also had a brand of running shoes called Huarache since 1991, with a design they claim is inspired by the sandal.

== See also ==
- List of shoe styles
- Ho Chi Minh sandals, Vietnamese footwear made from old tires
- Huarache (running shoe)
- Waraji
