= Huarache (running shoe) =

Type of running sandal

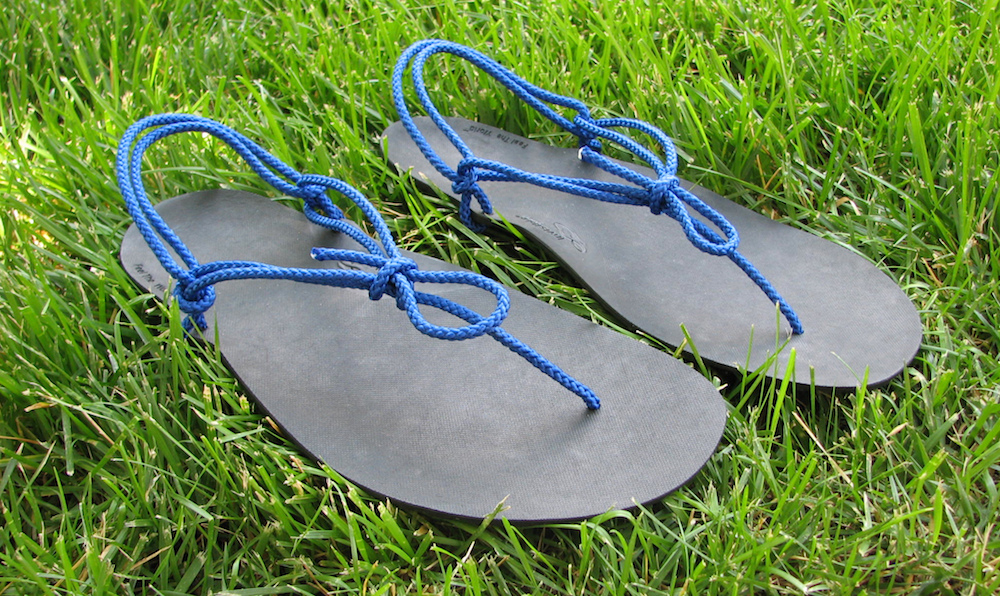
Huaraches, laced up on the ground

Huaraches are an open type of outdoor footwear, consisting of a sole held to the wearer's foot by straps passing over the instep and around the ankle. The common understanding is that these sandals were a variant of traditional Mexican huaraches, the difference being in design and construction.

These sandals are favoured by minimalist runners for several reasons. They force the foot and the runner to run with a natural gait. They also help protect the foot from glass, gravel, and other debris.

In Christopher McDougall's book Born to Run, the author describes the Rarámuri of the Mexican Copper Canyons teaching a fellow runner how to build huaraches.

== Design ==
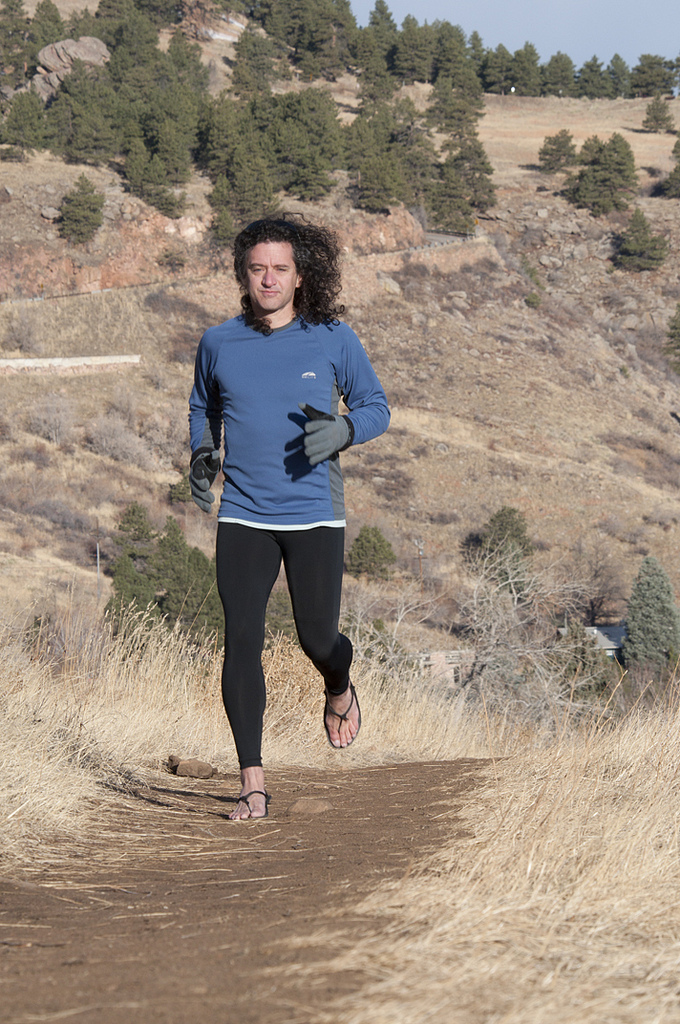
Man running, wearing huaraches

The primary design difference from traditional huaraches is in the straps that cover the front of the foot. In the traditional sandals, the straps are woven in an intricate design. In the variant used for running, the straps are much simpler and less ornate.

== Construction ==
Huaraches were originally made from leather, and later from the tread of used automobile tires. Since then, rubber manufactured as replacement outsole for shoes, such as the Vibram Cherry, has been used. More recently, commercial manufacturers have created pre-cut rubber soles for the construction of huaraches. Additionally, some manufacturers create soles shaped to custom outlines of the wearer's feet.

The laces for huaraches are either synthetic, hemp or leather. Synthetic laces are usually made of polyester or nylon. Generally shoelaces are of narrow construction, and thin cordage similar to parachute cord is used.

== See also ==
- Barefoot running
- Athletic shoe
- Flip-flops
- List of shoe styles
