= Barefoot running =

Running with minimalist or no shoes

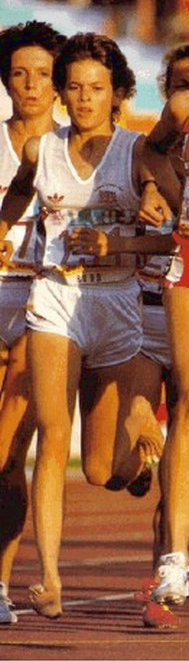
Runner Zola Budd at the 1984 Summer Olympics

Barefoot running, also called "natural running", is the act of running without footwear. With the advent of modern footwear, running barefoot has become less common in most parts of the world but is still practiced in parts of Africa and Latin America. In some Western countries, barefoot running has grown in popularity due to perceived health benefits such as the reduction of flat feet, decreased risk of plantar fasciitis, and the belief that running barefoot burns more calories than running in shoes.

Scientific research into the practice of running barefoot or with minimalist shoes is increasingly suggesting that it increases intrinsic foot muscle size and strength, but it has been limited to healthy individuals and further research is required to reach definite conclusions. While footwear might provide protection from cuts, bruises, impact and weather, proponents argue that running barefoot reduces the risk of chronic injuries (notably repetitive stress injuries) caused by heel striking in padded running shoes.

The barefoot movement has prompted some manufacturers to introduce minimalist shoes, thin-soled and flexible shoes such as traditional moccasins and huaraches for minimalist running.

== History ==
Throughout most of human history, running was performed while barefoot or in thin-soled shoes such as moccasins. This practice continues today in Kenya and among the Tarahumara people of northern Mexico. Historians believe that the runners of Ancient Greece ran barefoot. According to legend, Pheidippides, the first marathoner, ran from Athens to Sparta in less than 36 hours. After the Battle of Marathon, it is said he ran straight from the battlefield to Athens to inform the Athenians of the Greek victory over Persia.

=== Late 20th-century comeback of barefoot running in races ===
In 1960, Abebe Bikila of Ethiopia won the Olympic marathon in Rome barefoot setting a new world record after discovering that Adidas, the Olympic shoe supplier, had run out of shoes in his size. He was in pain because he had received shoes that were too small, so he decided to simply run barefoot; Bikila had trained running barefoot prior to the Olympics. He would go on to defend his Olympic title four years later in Tokyo while wearing Puma shoes and setting a new world record.

British runner Bruce Tulloh competed in many races during the 1960s while barefoot, and won the gold medal in the 1962 European Games 5,000-metre race.

In the 1970s, Shivnath Singh, one of India's greatest long-distance runners, was known for always running barefoot with only tape on his feet.

During the 1980s, a South African runner, Zola Budd, became known for her barefoot running style as well as training and racing barefoot. She won the 1985 and 1986 IAAF World Cross Country Championships and competed in the 1984 Olympic Games in Los Angeles.

Kenyan runner Tegla Loroupe began running barefoot 10 km (6.2 mi) to and from school every day at the age of seven. She performed well in contests at school, and in 1988, won a prestigious cross country barefoot race. She went on to compete, both barefoot and shod, in several international competitions, marathons, and half-marathons. She won the Goodwill Games over 10,000 metres, barefoot, and was the first African woman to win the New York City Marathon in 1994, winning again in 1998.

=== Born to Run and mainstream popularity ===
In the 2000s, barefoot running gained a small yet significant following on the fringe of the larger running community. The practice saw a surge in popularity after the 2009 publication of Christopher McDougall's book, Born to Run, promoting the practice. In the United States, the Barefoot Runners Society was founded in November 2009 as a national club for unshod runners and grew quickly.

== Health and medical implications ==
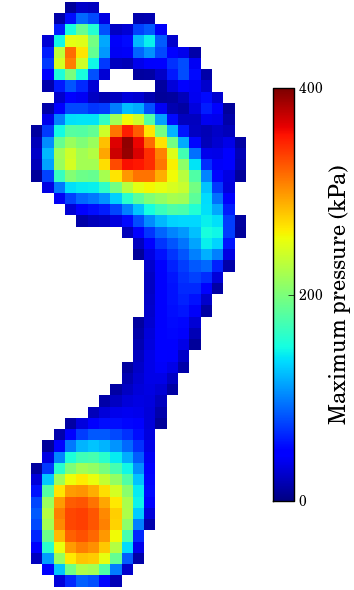
Example foot pressure

Since the latter half of the 20th century, there has been scientific and medical interest in the benefits and harm involved in barefoot running. The 1970s, in particular, saw a resurgent interest in jogging in western countries and modern running shoes were developed and marketed. Since then, running shoes have been blamed for the increased incidence of running injuries and this has prompted some runners to go barefoot.

The structure of the human foot and lower leg is very efficient at absorbing the shock of landing and turning the energy of the fall into forward motion, through the springing action of the foot's natural arch. Scientists studying runners' foot motions have observed striking differences between habitually shod runners (wearing shoes) and barefoot runners. The foot of habitually shod runners typically lands with an initial heel strike, while the foot of a barefoot runner lands with a more springy step on the middle, or on the ball of the foot. In addition, the strike is shorter in duration and the step rate is higher. When looking at the muscle activity (electromyography), studies have shown a higher pre-activation of the plantar flexor muscles when running barefoot. Indeed, since muscles' role is to prepare the locomotor system for the contact with the ground, muscle activity before the strike depends on the expected impact. Forefoot strike, shorter step duration, higher rate and higher muscle pre-activation are techniques to reduce stress of repetitive high shocks. This avoids a very painful and heavy impact, equivalent to two to three times the body weight.

A prospective study from 2019 found that when habituated to barefoot running (for two months with 15 minutes per week of barefoot running), participants exhibited higher vertical loading rates than shod runners, contradicting Lieberman and the asserted injury prevention potential of barefoot running. Another study from 2018 showed that the highest load rates are found in injured heel striking runners.

When comparing different populations of habitually barefoot runners, not all of them favour the forefoot strike. A 2012 study focusing on 38 runners of the Daasanach tribe in Kenya found that a majority of runners favoured a heel strike instead of a forefoot strike.

The longitudinal (medial) arch of the foot also may undergo physiological changes upon habitually training barefoot. The longitudinal arch has been observed to decrease in length by an average of 4.7 mm, suggesting activation of foot musculature when barefoot that is usually inactive when shod. These muscles allow the foot to dampen impact and may remove stress from the plantar fascia. In addition to muscle changes, barefoot running also reduces energy use: oxygen consumption was found to be approximately 4% higher in shod versus barefoot runners. Better running economy observed when running barefoot compared to running with shoes can be explained by a better use of the muscle elasticity. Reduction of contact time and higher pre-stretch level can enhance the stretch shortening cycle behaviour of the plantar flexor muscles and thus possibly allow a better storage and restitution of elastic energy compared to shod running.

The running shoe itself has also been examined as a possible cause of many injuries associated with shod running. It has been found that running in conventional running shoes increases stress on the knee joints up to 38%. It is still unclear if this leads to a higher rate of heel injuries or not. One study suggests that there is no evidence that cushioning or pronation control in shoes reduces injury rates or reduces performance. Improperly fitting shoes may also result in injuries such as a subungual hematoma, a collection of blood underneath the toenail. This may also be known as "runner's toe" or "tennis toe".

Switching from comforted shoe running to barefoot running can come along with injury risk as well as other concerns. This can be a result as failing to transition from a heel strike (more common with shod runners) to a forefoot strike (more common with barefoot runners). It is therefore advisable that runners moving to barefoot running should do so slowly, to allow their body to adjust and to avoid muscle-tendon strain.

Depending on the environment, barefoot running also bears a generalized increased risk of skin abrasions, thermal injury, puncture wounds, and localized infection. For this reason, those with immunodeficiency should generally not partake in barefoot running, as the potential benefits are outweighed by the higher risk of infection.

According to a University of Virginia survey of 509 runners who had tried barefoot running, 64% of respondents claimed they had no new injuries after converting from shod to barefoot running. In addition, 69% of respondents claimed that previous injuries went away when converting to barefoot running. Specifically, respondents said that they saw improvements in knee, foot, ankle, hip and low back injuries.

== Minimal footwear ==
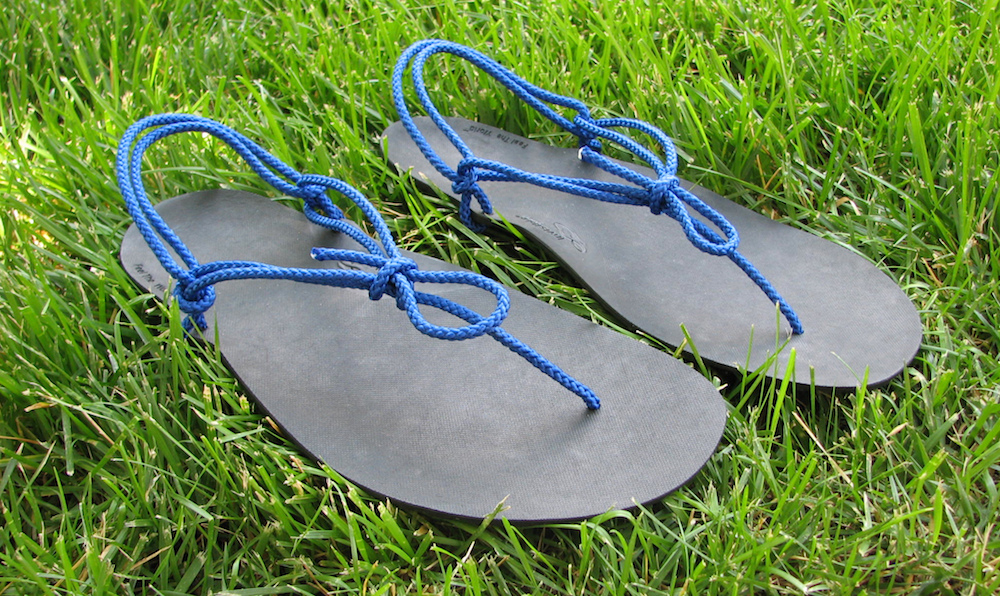
A pair of Xero Shoes Huaraches, laced up on grass

The alternative to going barefoot is to wear thin shoes with minimal padding. This is what runners wore for thousands of years before the 1980s when the modern running shoe was invented. Shoes, such as moccasins or thin sandals, permit a similar gait as barefoot, but protect the feet from cuts, abrasion and soft sticky matter. The Tarahumara wear thin-soled sandals known as huaraches. These sandals have a single long lace with a thin sole made from either recycled tires, commercially available replacement outsole rubber, or leather. The practice of wearing light or no shoes while running may be termed "minimalist running".

Historically, plimsolls were worn by children in the United Kingdom for physical education classes as well as by soldiers for PT. Inexpensive "dime store" plimsolls have very thin footbeds (3mm elastomer/rubber outsole, 1mm card, 2mm eva foam) and no heel lift or stiffening.

== See also ==
- Comparative foot morphology
- Locomotor effects of shoes
