= Xero Shoes =

Brand of lightweight minimalist footwear

Feel the World Inc.
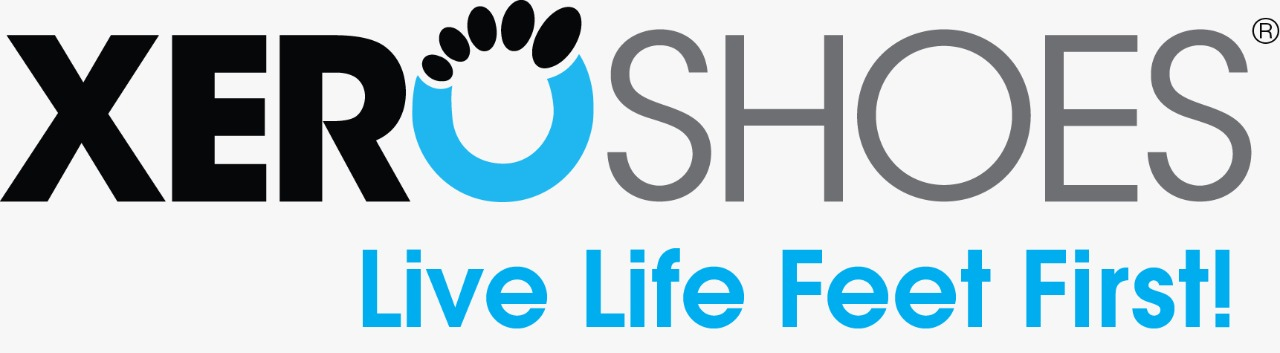
- Trade name: Xero Shoes
- Type: Private company
- Industry: Footwear
- Founded: November 23, 2009 in Boulder, Colorado, U.S.
- Founder: Steven Sashen and Lena Phoenix
- Headquarters: Broomfield, CO, United States
- Key people: Steven Sashen (CEO); Lena Phoenix (president and board chairwoman); Dennis Driscoll (chief product officer)
- Products: Xero Shoes
- Revenue: ▲$33.6 million (2021); $23.0 million (2020)
- Website: xeroshoes.com

Xero Shoes is a brand of lightweight minimalist footwear manufactured by Feel the World Inc. Founded in 2009 by Steven Sashen and Lena Phoenix, the company's initial product was DIY sandals made only of a rubber sole and laces, but the company later introduced ready-made sandals and closed-toed shoes. Xero Shoes was featured on ABC's Shark Tank and gained success after the appearance in February 2013.

== History ==
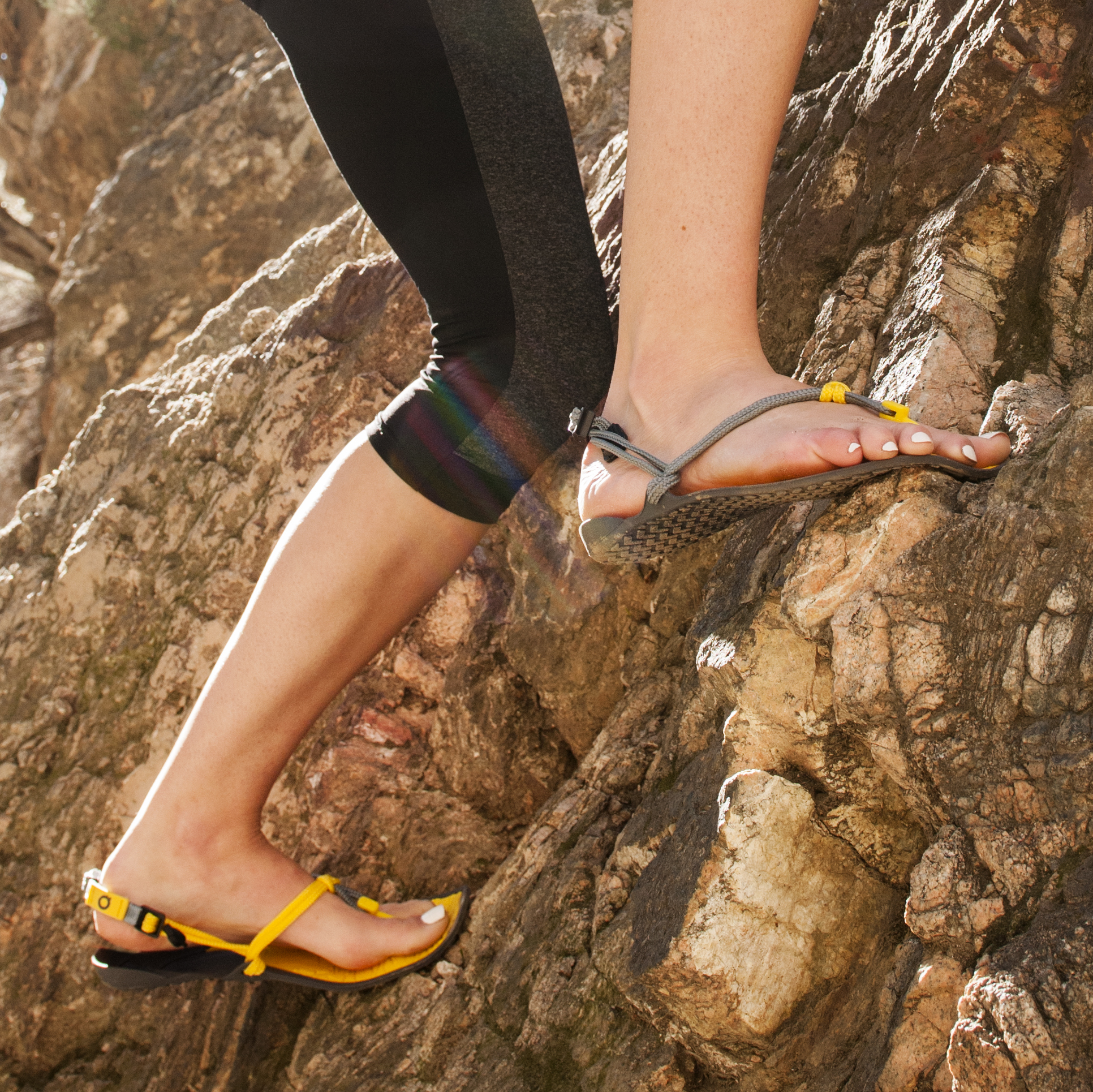
Xero Shoes minimalist sandals

Xero Shoes was founded by Steven Sashen and Lena Phoenix, a married couple who started the company in 2009. Sashen had suffered running injuries and, inspired partly by the book Born To Run by Christopher McDougall, he created the company's first designs for minimalist footwear using sheets of rubber he ordered in bulk and laces from The Home Depot. These original sandals were DIY assembled by the user and were called "Invisible Shoes".

Initially based out of their home office, in late 2012, Sashen and Phoenix moved the company to a building on Conestoga Court in Boulder, Colorado. They also hired Dennis Driscoll, who has previously worked for Avia, Crocs, Dr. Martens, and Wilson Sporting Goods, as chief product officer.

The company appeared in season 4 of Shark Tank. On an episode that aired on February 1, 2013, Sashen and Phoenix appeared before investors on the ABC business reality show, but rejected an offer of $400,000 for 50% of the company from Kevin O'Leary.

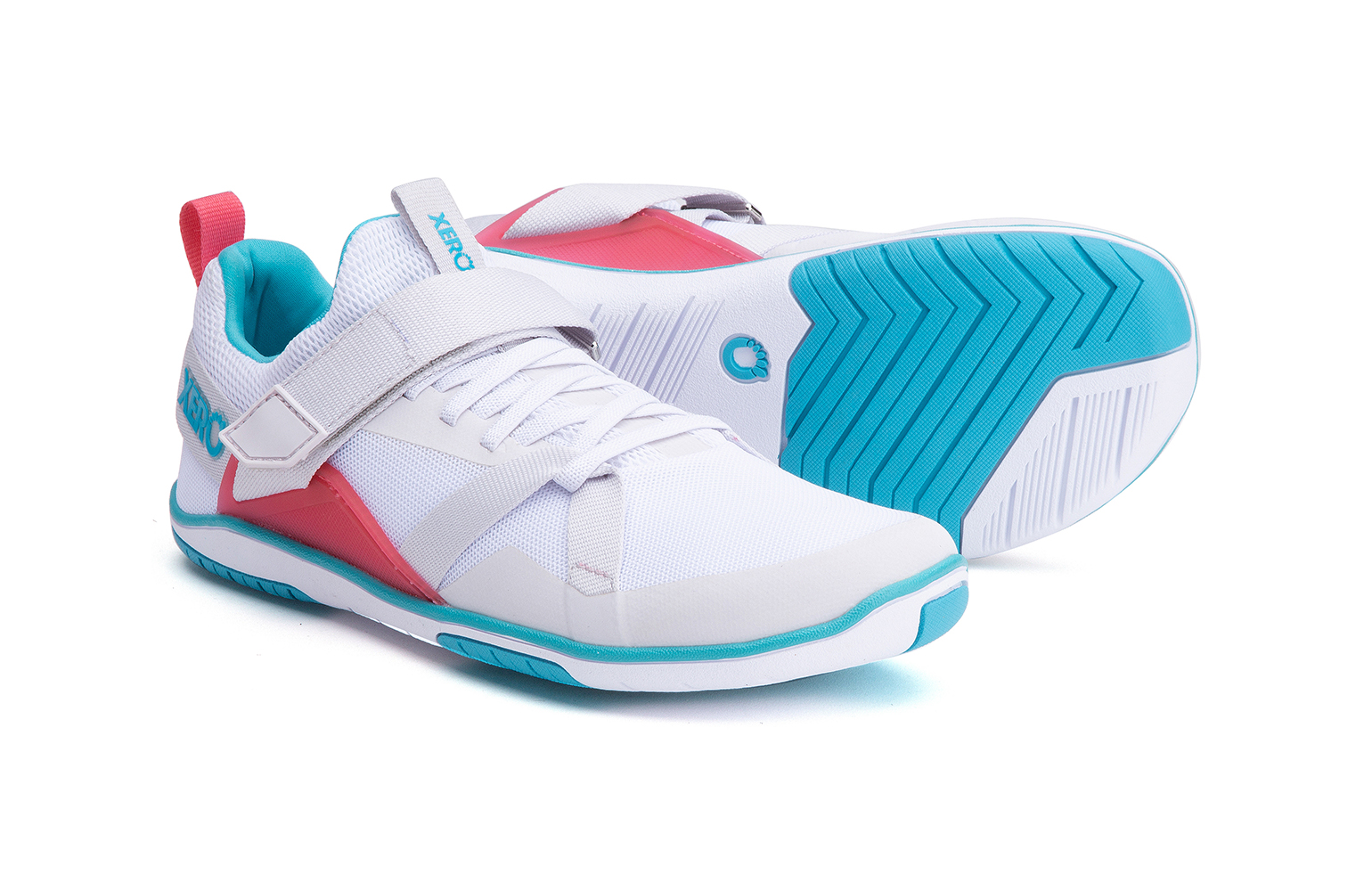
Forza Trainer

In January 2015, the company moved into a new office in Broomfield, Colorado. Xero Shoes introduced its first closed-toed shoes in 2016. In April 2017, the company began a crowdfunding campaign to raise capital for expansion of its product offering. By September, the company had raised more $1 million.

At the artistic swimming events at the 2020 Summer Olympics, the US team used Xero Shoes when not inside the pool. The company's shoes were also used by some of the athletes on US archery team.

In December 2020, TZP Group, a private equity firm, acquired a minority interest in the company for $12.5 million. On November 11, 2021, Xero Shoes expanded into Europe with a new website at xeroshoes.eu and a second office in Prague, Czech Republic. It reported $33.6 million in revenue in 2021 and $22 million in the first half of 2022.

In April 2023, McDougall and Eric Orton announced the release of a new line for Xero Shoes named Born to Run.
