= Analysis =

Process of understanding a complex topic or substance

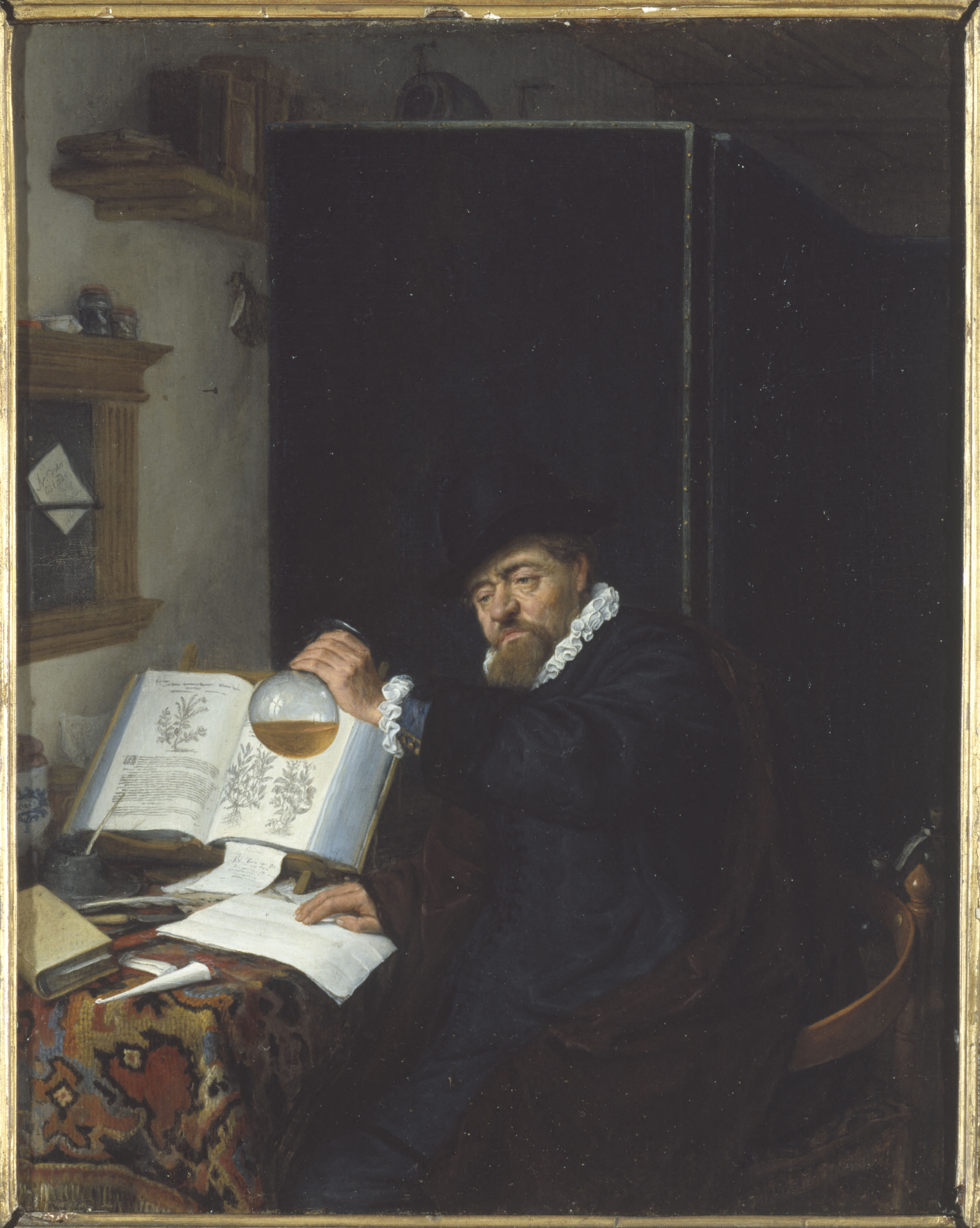
Adriaen van Ostade, "Analysis" (1666)

Analysis (pl.: analyses) is the process of breaking a complex topic or substance into smaller parts in order to gain a better understanding of it. The technique has been applied in the study of mathematics and logic since before Aristotle, though analysis as a formal concept is a relatively recent development.

The word comes from the Ancient Greek ἀνάλυσις (analysis, "a breaking-up" or "an untying" from ana- "up, throughout" and lysis "a loosening"). From it also comes the word's plural, analyses.

As a formal concept, the method has variously been ascribed to René Descartes (Discourse on the Method), and Galileo Galilei. It has also been ascribed to Isaac Newton, in the form of a practical method of physical discovery (which he did not name).

The converse of analysis is synthesis: putting the pieces back together again in a new or different whole.

== Academic analysis ==
Academic analysis is a systematic, methodological approach to inquiry used across scholarly disciplines to deconstruct complex ideas, texts, data, or systems. Its primary aim is to foster a deeper, evidence-based understanding, challenge assumptions, and contribute to a body of knowledge through critical examination and rigorous argumentation. This form of analysis is foundational to higher education and research, distinguished by its adherence to disciplinary conventions, peer review, and the use of established theoretical or conceptual frameworks.

Methods vary significantly by field. In the humanities, it often involves hermeneutic or discourse analysis to interpret the meaning, context, and ideology within texts and artifacts. In the social sciences, analysis frequently employs qualitative methods (e.g., thematic analysis, content analysis) and quantitative methods (e.g., statistical analysis, econometrics) to examine human behavior and societal structures. In the natural and formal sciences, the analytical process is characterized by hypothesis testing, mathematical modeling, and the reproducible analysis of empirical data.

A cornerstone of academic analysis is reflexivity, where scholars critically examine their own role, potential biases, and the influence of their theoretical position on the analytical process. The product of academic analysis is typically a sustained argument presented in a format such as a monograph, journal article, or dissertation, which is subjected to peer evaluation for validity, originality, and contribution to the field.

== Humanities and social sciences ==
=== Linguistics ===
Linguistics is the scientific study of language. It involves the systematic analysis of the properties of specific languages as well as the universal characteristics of language in general, including its structure, use, and cognitive and social aspects. Linguistics explores individual languages and language in general by breaking language down into component parts for analysis. Core areas of analysis include theory, phonetics (the production and perception of speech sounds), phonology (the abstract sound systems of languages and the systematic organization of sounds in a language), morphology (the structure and formation of words), the history of words and word origins, semantics (the study of linguistic meaning, including the meaning of words and word combinations), semantic analysis, syntax (the rules governing the structure and construction of sentences), pragmatics (how context contributes to meaning and how utterances are used), discourse analysis (basic construction beyond the sentence level), conversation, and stylistics.

Theoretical linguistics is concerned with developing a general framework for understanding the fundamental nature of language. Linguistics also encompasses the study of language change over time, known as historical linguistics.

Linguistics examines these areas using a range of methods, including tools from computational linguistics that involve computational modelling, statistics, and modeling of natural language. The field also analyses language through interdisciplinary approaches that consider its context, including anthropological linguistics (which investigates the place of language in its wider social and cultural context); biolinguistics and evolutionary linguistics; geography; sociolinguistics; psycholinguistics; neurolinguistics and neurology; linguistic anthropology (a subfield of anthropology using anthropological methods to study language within a cultural framework); history; and related perspectives from anthropology, biology, evolution, psychology, and sociology.

The field takes applied approaches, utilizing scientific findings for practical purposes under the umbrella of applied linguistics. This includes understanding language acquisition and individual language development across the human lifespan, encompassing both first-language acquisition in children and second-language learning in adults. Applied linguistics also addresses clinical issues in communication disorders, applying linguistic theory and methods to their study, diagnosis, and assessment. It also includes improving language education and other applied and interdisciplinary subfields such as computational linguistics, as well as areas such as stylistics.

=== Literature ===
Literary criticism is the analysis of literature. The focus can be as diverse as the analysis of Homer or Freud. While not all literary-critical methods are primarily analytical in nature, the main approach to the teaching of literature in the west since the mid-twentieth century, literary formal analysis or close reading, is. This method, rooted in the academic movement labelled The New Criticism, approaches texts – chiefly short poems such as sonnets, which by virtue of their small size and significant complexity lend themselves well to this type of analysis – as units of discourse that can be understood in themselves, without reference to biographical or historical frameworks. This method of analysis breaks up the text linguistically in a study of prosody (the formal analysis of meter) and phonic effects such as alliteration and rhyme, and cognitively in examination of the interplay of syntactic structures, figurative language, and other elements of the poem that work to produce its larger effects.

=== Music ===
- Musical analysis – a process attempting to answer the question "How does this music work?"
  - Musical Analysis is a study of how the composers use the notes together to compose music. Those studying music will find differences with each composer's musical analysis, which differs depending on the culture and history of music studied. An analysis of music is meant to simplify the music for you.
- Schenkerian analysis
  - Schenkerian analysis is a collection of music analysis that focuses on the production of the graphic representation. This includes both analytical procedure as well as the notational style. Simply put, it analyzes tonal music which includes all chords and tones within a composition.

=== Philosophy ===
- Philosophical analysis – a general term for the techniques used by philosophers
  - Philosophical analysis refers to the clarification and composition of words put together and the entailed meaning behind them. Philosophical analysis dives deeper into the meaning of words and seeks to clarify that meaning by contrasting the various definitions. It is the study of reality, justification of claims, and the analysis of various concepts. Branches of philosophy include logic, justification, metaphysics, values and ethics. If questions can be answered empirically, meaning it can be answered by using the senses, then it is not considered philosophical. Non-philosophical questions also include events that happened in the past, or questions science or mathematics can answer.
- Analysis is the name of a prominent journal in philosophy.

== Science and technology ==
=== Chemistry ===
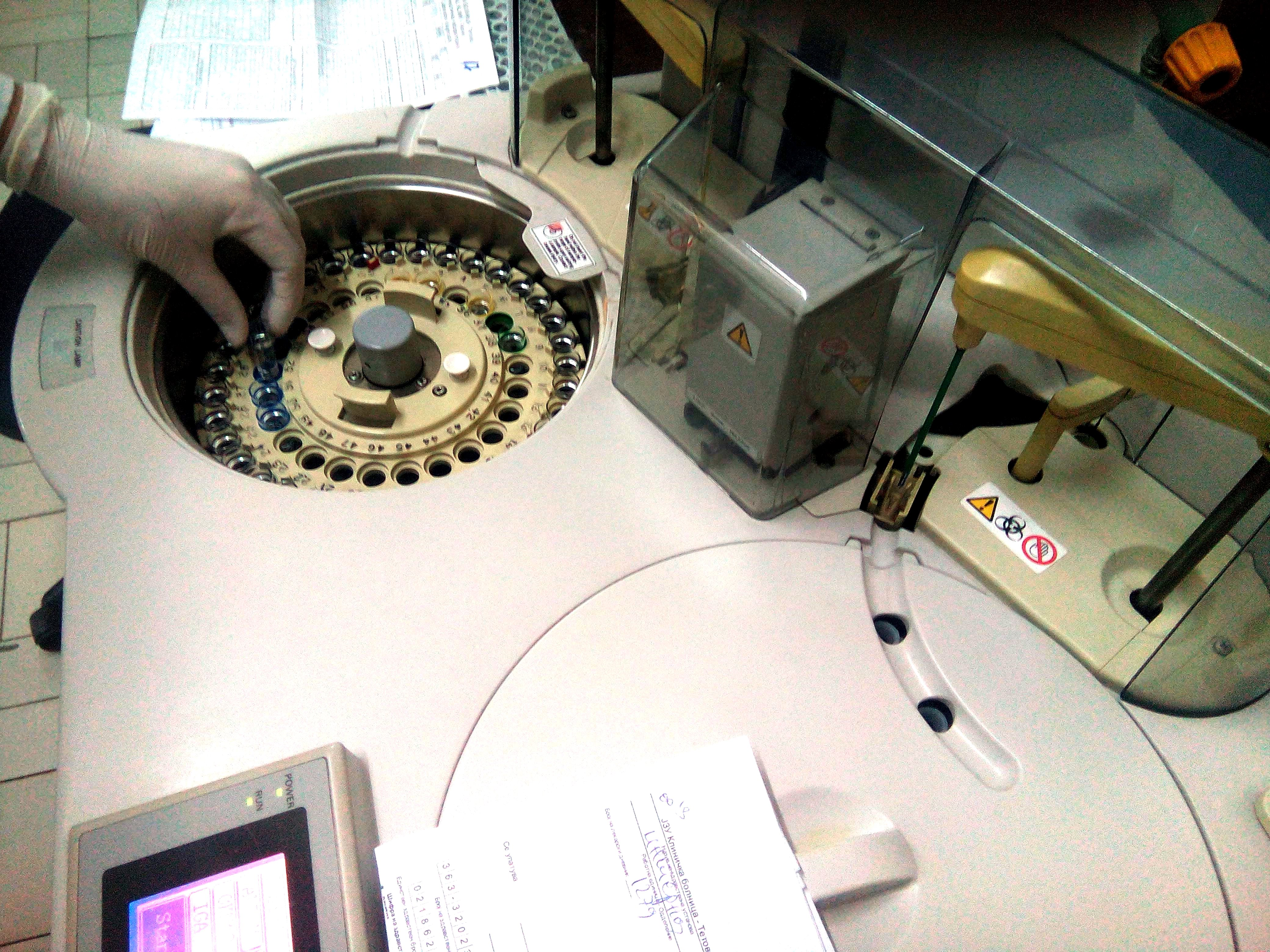
A clinical chemistry analyzer

The field of chemistry uses analysis in three ways: to identify the components of a particular chemical compound (qualitative analysis), to identify the proportions of components in a mixture (quantitative analysis), and to break down chemical processes and examine chemical reactions between elements of matter. For an example of its use, analysis of the concentration of elements is important in managing a nuclear reactor, so nuclear scientists will analyze neutron activation to develop discrete measurements within vast samples. A matrix can have a considerable effect on the way a chemical analysis is conducted and the quality of its results. Analysis can be done manually or with a device.

==== Types of Analysis ====
Qualitative Analysis
It is concerned with which components are in a given sample or compound.
Example: Precipitation reaction
Quantitative Analysis
It is to determine the quantity of individual component present in a given sample or compound.
Example: To find concentration by uv-spectrophotometer.

==== Isotopes ====
Chemists can use isotope analysis to assist analysts with issues in anthropology, archeology, food chemistry, forensics, geology, and a host of other questions of physical science. Analysts can discern the origins of natural and man-made isotopes in the study of environmental radioactivity.

=== Computer science ===
- Requirements analysis – encompasses those tasks that go into determining the needs or conditions to meet for a new or altered product, taking account of the possibly conflicting requirements of the various stakeholders, such as beneficiaries or users.
- Competitive analysis (online algorithm) – shows how online algorithms perform and demonstrates the power of randomization in algorithms
- Lexical analysis – the process of processing an input sequence of characters and producing as output a sequence of symbols
- Object-oriented analysis and design – à la Booch
- Program analysis (computer science) – the process of automatically analysing the behavior of computer programs
- Semantic analysis (computer science) – a pass by a compiler that adds semantical information to the parse tree and performs certain checks
- Static code analysis – the analysis of computer software that is performed without actually executing programs built from that
- Structured systems analysis and design methodology – à la Yourdon
- Syntax analysis – a process in compilers that recognizes the structure of programming languages, also known as parsing
- Worst-case execution time – determines the longest time that a piece of software can take to run

=== Engineering ===
Analysts in the field of engineering look at requirements, structures, mechanisms, systems and dimensions. Electrical engineers analyse systems in electronics. Life cycles and system failures are broken down and studied by engineers. It is also looking at different factors incorporated within the design.

=== Mathematics ===
Modern mathematical analysis is the study of infinite processes. It is the branch of mathematics that includes calculus. It can be applied in the study of classical concepts of mathematics, such as real numbers, complex variables, trigonometric functions, and algorithms, or of non-classical concepts like constructivism, harmonics, infinity, and vectors.

Florian Cajori explains in A History of Mathematics (1893) the difference between modern and ancient mathematical analysis, as distinct from logical analysis, as follows:

The terms synthesis and analysis are used in mathematics in a more special sense than in logic. In ancient mathematics they had a different meaning from what they now have. The oldest definition of mathematical analysis as opposed to synthesis is that given in [appended to] Euclid, XIII. 5, which in all probability was framed by Eudoxus: "Analysis is the obtaining of the thing sought by assuming it and so reasoning up to an admitted truth; synthesis is the obtaining of the thing sought by reasoning up to the inference and proof of it."

The analytic method is not conclusive, unless all operations involved in it are known to be reversible. To remove all doubt, the Greeks, as a rule, added to the analytic process a synthetic one, consisting of a reversion of all operations occurring in the analysis. Thus the aim of analysis was to aid in the discovery of synthetic proofs or solutions.

James Gow uses a similar argument as Cajori, with the following clarification, in his A Short History of Greek Mathematics (1884):

The synthetic proof proceeds by shewing that the proposed new truth involves certain admitted truths. An analytic proof begins by an assumption, upon which a synthetic reasoning is founded. The Greeks distinguished theoretic from problematic analysis. A theoretic analysis is of the following kind. To prove that A is B, assume first that A is B. If so, then, since B is C and C is D and D is E, therefore A is E. If this be known a falsity, A is not B. But if this be a known truth and all the intermediate propositions be convertible, then the reverse process, A is E, E is D, D is C, C is B, therefore A is B, constitutes a synthetic proof of the original theorem. Problematic analysis is applied in all cases where it is proposed to construct a figure which is assumed to satisfy a given condition. The problem is then converted into some theorem which is involved in the condition and which is proved synthetically, and the steps of this synthetic proof taken backwards are a synthetic solution of the problem.

=== Psychotherapy ===
- Psychoanalysis – seeks to elucidate connections among unconscious components of patients' mental processes
- Transactional analysis
  - Transactional analysis is used by therapists to try to gain a better understanding of the unconscious. It focuses on understanding and intervening human behavior.

=== Signal processing ===
- Finite element analysis – a computer simulation technique used in engineering analysis
- Independent component analysis
- Link quality analysis – the analysis of signal quality
- Path quality analysis
- Fourier analysis

=== Statistics ===
In statistics, the term analysis may refer to any method used for data analysis. Among the many such methods, some are:

- Analysis of variance (ANOVA) – a collection of statistical models and their associated procedures which compare means by splitting the overall observed variance into different parts
- Boolean analysis – a method to find deterministic dependencies between variables in a sample, mostly used in exploratory data analysis
- Cluster analysis – techniques for finding groups (called clusters), based on some measure of proximity or similarity
- Factor analysis – a method to construct models describing a data set of observed variables in terms of a smaller set of unobserved variables (called factors)
- Meta-analysis – combines the results of several studies that address a set of related research hypotheses
- Multivariate analysis – analysis of data involving several variables, such as by factor analysis, regression analysis, or principal component analysis
- Principal component analysis – transformation of a sample of correlated variables into uncorrelated variables (called principal components), mostly used in exploratory data analysis
- Regression analysis – techniques for analysing the relationships between several predictive variables and one or more outcomes in the data
- Scale analysis (statistics) – methods to analyse survey data by scoring responses on a numeric scale
- Sensitivity analysis – the study of how the variation in the output of a model depends on variations in the inputs
- Sequential analysis – evaluation of sampled data as it is collected, until the criterion of a stopping rule is met
- Spatial analysis – the study of entities using geometric or geographic properties
- Time-series analysis – methods that attempt to understand a sequence of data points spaced apart at uniform time intervals

== Business ==
- Financial statement analysis – the analysis of the accounts and the economic prospects of a firm
- Financial analysis – refers to an assessment of the viability, stability, and profitability of a business, sub-business or project
- Gap analysis – involves the comparison of actual performance with potential or desired performance of an organization
- Business analysis – involves identifying the needs and determining the solutions to business problems
- Price analysis – involves the breakdown of a price to a unit figure
- Market analysis – consists of suppliers and customers, and price is determined by the interaction of supply and demand
- Sum-of-the-parts analysis – method of valuation of a multi-divisional company
- Opportunity analysis – consists of customers trends within the industry, customer demand and experience determine purchasing behavior

== Economics ==
- Agroecosystem analysis
- Input–output model if applied to a region, is called Regional Impact Multiplier System

== Government ==
=== Intelligence ===
The field of intelligence employs analysts to break down and understand a wide array of questions. Intelligence agencies may use heuristics, inductive and deductive reasoning, social network analysis, dynamic network analysis, link analysis, and brainstorming to sort through problems they face. Military intelligence may explore issues through the use of game theory, Red Teaming, and wargaming. Signals intelligence applies cryptanalysis and frequency analysis to break codes and ciphers. Business intelligence applies theories of competitive intelligence analysis and competitor analysis to resolve questions in the marketplace. Law enforcement intelligence applies a number of theories in crime analysis.

=== Policy ===
- Policy analysis – The use of statistical data to predict the effects of policy decisions made by governments and agencies
  - Policy analysis includes a systematic process to find the most efficient and effective option to address the current situation.
- Qualitative analysis – The use of anecdotal evidence to predict the effects of policy decisions or, more generally, influence policy decisions

== Other ==
- Aura analysis – a pseudoscientific technique in which supporters of the method claim that the body's aura, or energy field is analysed
- Bowling analysis – Analysis of the performance of cricket players
- Lithic analysis – the analysis of stone tools using basic scientific techniques
  - Lithic analysis is most often used by archeologists in determining which types of tools were used at a given time period pertaining to current artifacts discovered.
- Protocol analysis – a means for extracting persons' thoughts while they are performing a task

== See also ==
- Formal analysis
- Metabolism in biology
- Methodology
- Scientific method
- Synthesis (disambiguation) – list of terms related to synthesis, the converse of analysis
