= Locomotor =

Locomotor may refer to:

- Locomotor, the Dutch equivalent of the German Kleinlokomotive, a locomotive of small size and low power for light shunting duties
- Locomotor activity
- Locomotor ataxia
- Locomotor effects of shoes
- Locomotor stimulation
- Locomotor system (disambiguation)

== See also ==
- Locomotion (disambiguation)
- Locomotive (disambiguation)
