= Locomobile =

Locomobile may refer to:

== Transport ==
- Locomobile Company of America, a US company that made automobiles under the brand name "Locomobile" from 1899 to 1929
- Steam-powered agricultural and haulage vehicles:
  - Traction engine
  - Portable engine
  - Steam tractor

== Fiction ==
- Locomobiles, in Robert Sobel's alternate history book For Want of a Nail

== See also ==
- Road locomotive (disambiguation)
- Road train
- Locomotive
- Automobile
