= Locomotion =

Locomotion means the act or ability of something to transport or move itself from place to place.

Locomotion may refer to:

== Motion ==
- Motion (physics)
- Robot locomotion, of man-made devices

== By environment ==
- Aquatic locomotion
- Flight
- Locomotion in space
- Terrestrial locomotion

== Biological locomotion ==
=== Animal locomotion ===
- Animal locomotion
  - Climbing
  - Crawl (disambiguation)
  - Flight
    - Bird flight
    - Bat flight
    - Insect flight
  - Jet propulsion
  - Fin and flipper locomotion
  - Fish locomotion (swimming, others)
  - Gait analysis
    - Horse gaits
      - Trot (horse gait)
  - Jumping
  - Running
  - Slithering, limbless terrestrial locomotion
    - Snake locomotion
  - Swimming
  - Walking

==== Fine and gross motor skills ====
- Fine motor skills (smaller muscles; fine movements)
- Gross motor skills (larger muscles; large movements)

=== Microbial locomotion ===
- Microswimmer
- Protist locomotion, locomotion of unicellular eukaryotes
- Bacterial motility

== Arts, entertainment, and media ==
=== Clubs ===
- Loco Motion (Youth Group), a film and media club based in Essex, UK

=== Games ===
- Loco-Motion (video game), a 1982 arcade game by Konami
- Chris Sawyer's Locomotion, a 2004 computer game by Chris Sawyer

=== Music ===
- "The Loco-Motion", a 1962 song by Little Eva; covered by Kylie Minogue in 1987
- "Locomotion" (Orchestral Manoeuvres in the Dark song), 1984
- "Locomotion", a 1958 song by John Coltrane from Blue Train

=== Publications ===
- Locomotion (periodical), a railway-related magazine
- Locomotion, a young adult novel in poetic form by Jacqueline Woodson

=== Television ===
- Locomotion (TV channel), cable TV channel in Latin America

== Other ==
- Locomotion No. 1, an early steam locomotive by George Stephenson
- Locomotion Museum, in Shildon, England
- Travel

== See also ==
- "Loco-Emotion", a song on Kix's album Cool Kids
- Locomotive (disambiguation)
- Locomotor (disambiguation)
