= Lokomotiv =

Lokomotiv often refers to:

- Lokomotiv (sports society), formerly Soviet Union, now Commonwealth of Independent States

Lokomotiv may also refer to:

== Association football ==
- FC Lokomotiv Chita, Russia
- FC Lokomotiv Liski, Russia
- FC Lokomotiv Moscow, Russia
- FC Lokomotiv Nizhny Novgorod, Russia
- FC Lokomotiv Saint Petersburg, Russia
- Lokomotiv Cove FC, Australia a.k.a. The Trains
- Lokomotiv-Bilajary FK, Azerbaijan
- PFC Lokomotiv Plovdiv, Bulgaria
- FC Lokomotiv Gorna Oryahovitsa, Bulgaria
- FC Lokomotiv Sofia, Bulgaria
- FC Lokomotiv Ruse, Bulgaria
- FC Lokomotiv Dryanovo, Bulgaria
- FC Lokomotiv Mezdra, Bulgaria
- NK Lokomotiva, Croatia
- FC Locomotive Tbilisi, Georgia
- FC Lokomotíva Košice, Slovakia
- 1. FC Lokomotive Leipzig, Germany
- Locomotiva Bălți, Moldova
- Lokomotiv Tashkent FK, Uzbekistan
- FC Lokomotyv Kyiv, Ukraine
- FK Lokomotiva Skopje, Macedonia
- El Paso Locomotive FC, United States

== Other sports ==
- HC Lokomotiv Yaroslavl, a Russian hockey team
- VC Lokomotiv Novosibirsk, a Russian volleyball team
- RC Lokomotiv Moscow, a Russian rugby league team
- PBC Lokomotiv Kuban, a Russian basketball team
- Lokomotiv Orenburg, a Russian bandy team
- RK Lokomotiva Zagreb, a Croatian handball team
- MFC Lokomotyv Kharkiv, a Ukrainian futsal team
- BSC Lokomotiv Moscow, a Russian beach soccer team
- Lokomotiv Baku, an Azerbaijani women's volleyball club
- Lokomotiv Balajary, an Azerbaijani women's volleyball club

== Other uses ==
- Lokomotiv (band), a Southern California band
- Lokomotiv (Moscow Central Circle), a rail station on the Moscow Metro

== See also ==
- Lokomotief Rijswijk, a Dutch basketball club
- Lokomotiv Stadium (disambiguation)
- Locomotive (disambiguation)
- Lokomotive, a German mountain
