= Sum-of-the-parts analysis =

Method of valuation of a company

Sum of the parts analysis (SOTP), or break-up analysis, is a method of valuation of a multi-divisional company, holding company, or a conglomerate. The essence of the method is to determine what divisions would be worth if the conglomerate were broken up and spun off or acquired by another company; see Conglomerate discount. The analysis calculates a range of values for a conglomerate's equity by summing the value of its individual business segments or divisions to get the total conglomerate's enterprise value. The equity value is then calculated by subtracting net debt and other non-operating adjustments.
