= ITT: The Management of Opportunity =

1982 book by Robert Sobel

- First edition cover
- Author: Robert Sobel
- Language: English
- Subject: Business history, ITT Corporation
- Genre: Non-fiction
- Publisher: Times Books
- Publication date: October 1982
- Publication place: United States
- Media type: Print
- Pages: 421 pp. (hardcover)
- ISBN: 0812910281

ITT: The Management of Opportunity is a non-fiction book about ITT Corporation by American business writer and historian Robert Sobel. The book was initially published by Times Books in 1982.

== Contents ==
In this book, Sobel concentrates on the history of ITT Corporation, one of the world's largest conglomerates. Back in the 1970s and 80s, the corporation acquired many various businesses—from a financial services companies to the famous Sheraton Hotels and Resorts (in those years known as ITT Sheraton), sometimes doing 20 deals a month.

== See also ==
- Conglomerate discount
- Holding company
- List of conglomerates
- Media conglomerate
- Pure play
- Subsidiary
