= Urozhay =

- City: Smidovich, Russia
- Home arena: Lokomotiv Stadium

KhK Urozhay (Russian: ХК Урожай) is a bandy club in Smidovich, Russia. The club was playing in the Russian Bandy Supreme League, the second tier of Russian bandy, until the 2015-16 season. The home games were played at Lokomotiv Stadium in Smidovich. The club colours are yellow and blue.
