= Lokomotiv Stadium =

Lokomotiv Stadium may refer to:

== Belarus ==
- Lokomotiv Stadium (Minsk)

== Bulgaria ==
- Lokomotiv Stadium (Gorna Oryahovitsa)
- Lokomotiv Stadium (Mezdra)
- Lokomotiv Stadium (Plovdiv)
- Lokomotiv Stadium (Sofia)
- Lokomotiv Stadium (Stara Zagora)

== Georgia ==
- Locomotive Stadium (Tbilisi)

== Latvia ==
- Stadium Lokomotīve (Daugavpils)

== Russia ==
- Lokomotiv Stadium (Chita)
- Lokomotiv Stadium (Moscow)
- Lokomotiv Stadium (Nizhny Novgorod)
- Lokomotiv Stadium (Perovo)
- Lokomotiv Stadium (Saratov)
- Lokomotiv Stadium (Smidovich), home ice of bandy club Urozhay

== Ukraine ==
- Lokomotiv Stadium (Donetsk)

== Uzbekistan ==
- Lokomotiv Stadium (Tashkent)
