= Robert Sobel =

American historian (1931–1999)

- Sobel in a promotional photo for his publisher
- Born: February 19, 1931; New York City, U.S.
- Died: June 2, 1999 (aged 68); Long Beach, New York, U.S.
- Occupations: Writer, editor, professor
- Years active: 1956–1999
- Spouse: Carole Ritter
- Children: 2

Academic background
- Education: City College of New York (BSS, MA); New York University (PhD)

Academic work
- Discipline: Business history
- Institutions: Hofstra University
- Notable works: For Want of a Nail (1973)

Robert Sobel (February 19, 1931 – June 2, 1999) was an American professor of history at Hofstra University and a prolific writer of business histories. During a career spanning more than four decades, he authored or co-authored more than 50 books and hundreds of articles on American business and finance.

== Early life and career ==
Sobel was born in the Bronx. He completed his B.S.S. (1951) and M.A. (1952) at City College of New York, and after serving in the U.S. Army, obtained a Ph.D. from New York University in 1957. He began teaching at Hofstra University in 1956 and remained on its faculty for 43 years, eventually becoming Lawrence Stessin Distinguished Professor of Business History.

== Books ==
Sobel's first business history, published in 1965, was The Big Board: A History of the New York Stock Market, the first history of the stock market written in over a generation. The book's commercial and critical success launched his writing career. Reviewing The Last Bull Market: Wall Street in the 1960s (1980), Andrew Tobias wrote in The New York Times that reading Sobel was "as though you are walking through a historical theme park, with this engaging man at your side pointing out the sights."

Most of Sobel's books were written for a general audience. His colleague George David Smith, a professor of economic history at New York University, noted that Sobel was undisturbed when some academic writers characterized him as a "popularizer": "Quite the contrary—he saw that as his mission in life." From 1972 to 1988, his weekly investment column "Knowing the Street" was nationally syndicated through Newsday. He also contributed to The New York Times and The Wall Street Journal, and at the time of his death was a contributing editor for Barron's.

Sobel was also known for his only work of fiction, the 1973 book For Want of a Nail, an alternate history in which Burgoyne won the Battle of Saratoga during the American Revolutionary War. The book presented the history of an alternate timeline complete with footnotes and a critical bibliography. It was republished in 1997 and received a special achievement Sidewise Award for Alternate History that year.

== Personal life and death ==
Sobel and his wife, the former Carole Ritter, had two children. He died from brain cancer at his home in Long Beach, New York, on June 2, 1999, at the age of 68. His final book, When Giants Stumble, was completed while he was undergoing cancer treatment and published by Prentice Hall shortly after his death. Hofstra University subsequently established the Robert Sobel Endowed Scholarship for Excellence in Business History and Finance in his memory.

== Selected bibliography ==
=== Fiction ===
- Sobel, Robert (1973). For Want of a Nail ...; If Burgoyne had won at Saratoga. New York: Macmillan.

=== Non-fiction ===
- Sobel, Robert (1960). The Origins of Interventionism: The United States and the Russo-Finnish War. New York: Bookman Associates.
- Sobel, Robert (1965). The Big Board: A History of the New York Stock Market. New York: Free Press.
- Sobel, Robert (1968). The Great Bull Market: Wall Street in the 1920s. New York: Norton.
- Sobel, Robert (1968). Panic on Wall Street: A History of America's Financial Disasters. New York: Macmillan.
- Sobel, Robert (1970). The Curbstone Brokers: The Origins of the American Stock Exchange. New York: Macmillan.
- Sobel, Robert (1972). The Age of Giant Corporations: A Microeconomic History of American Business, 1914–1970. Westport, Conn.: Greenwood Press. ISBN 0-8371-6404-4.
- Sobel, Robert (1973). The Money Manias: The Eras of Great Speculation in America, 1770–1970. New York: Weybright and Talley.
- Sobel, Robert (1974). The Entrepreneurs: Explorations Within the American Business Tradition. New York: Weybright and Talley. ISBN 0-679-40064-8.
- Sobel, Robert (1975). Herbert Hoover and the Onset of the Great Depression 1929–1930. New York: Lippincott. ISBN 0-397-47334-6.
- Sobel, Robert (1975). N.Y.S.E.: a history of the New York Stock Exchange: 1935–1975. New York: Weybright and Talley. ISBN 0-679-40124-5.
- Sobel, Robert (1978). They Satisfy: The Cigarette in American Life. New York: Anchor Press/Doubleday. ISBN 0-385-12956-4.
- Sobel, Robert (1980). Last Bull Market: Wall Street in the 1960s. New York: Norton. ISBN 0-393-01309-X.
- Sobel, Robert (1981). IBM: Colossus in Transition. New York: Times Books. ISBN 0-8129-1000-1.
- Sobel, Robert (1982). ITT: The Management of Opportunity. New York: Times Books. ISBN 0-8129-1028-1.
- Sobel, Robert (1984). The Rise and Fall of the Conglomerate Kings. New York: Stein and Day. ISBN 0-8128-2961-1.
- Sobel, Robert (1986). RCA. New York: Stein and Day. ISBN 0-8128-3084-9.
- Sobel, Robert; Sicilia, David (1986). The Entrepreneurs: An American Adventure. Boston: Houghton Mifflin. ISBN 0-395-42020-2.
- Sobel, Robert (1989). Trammell Crow, Master Builder: The Story of America's Largest Real Estate Empire. New York: Wiley. ISBN 0-471-61326-6.
- Sobel, Robert (1991). The Life and Times of Dillon Read. New York: Truman Talley Books/Dutton. ISBN 0-525-24959-1.
- Sobel, Robert (1993). Dangerous Dreamers: The Financial Innovators from Charles E. Merrill to Michael Milken. New York: Wiley. ISBN 0-471-57734-0.
- Sobel, Robert (1998). Coolidge: An American Enigma. Washington, D.C.: Regnery Pub. ISBN 0-89526-410-2.
- Sobel, Robert (1999). When Giants Stumble: Classic Business Blunders and How to Avoid Them. Paramus, N.J.: Prentice Hall. ISBN 0-7352-0059-9.
- Sobel, Robert (2000). The Great Boom 1950–2000: How a Generation of Americans Created the World's Most Prosperous Society. New York: St. Martin's Press. ISBN 0-312-20890-1.
