= Loco Motive =

Loco Motive may refer to:

- Loco Motive (video game), a 2024 point-and-click adventure video game
- Loco Motive (album), a 2005 country rap album

== See also ==
- Locomotive (disambiguation)
