= Woodlands School, Basildon =

Woodlands School

Location
- Woodlands Approach; Basildon, Essex, SS16 5BA; England; 51.564862°N 0.456208°E

Information
- Type: Academy
- Motto: Aspiration, Resilience, Opportunities, Excellence
- Founded: 28 November 1957
- Local authority: Essex
- Department for Education URN: 141214 Tables
- Ofsted: Reports
- Headteacher: David Wright
- Staff: approx. 300
- Gender: Coeducational
- Age: 11 to 16
- Enrolment: approx. 1600
- Website: www.woodlandsschool.org

Woodlands School is a secondary school in Basildon, Essex. The school currently educates more than 1600 students from Basildon and South East Essex.

== Overview ==
The school is on a single site and is made up of one main building. Woodlands School offers English, maths, science, languages (German, Spanish and French), geography, history, personal and social education, information and communication technologies, performing arts, media studies, design technology, art and physical education.

Previously a community school administered by Essex County Council, Woodlands School converted to academy status on 1 April 2015. However the school continues to coordinate with Essex County Council for admissions.

== Performing Arts ==
Since 2005, the school has been working to expand its specialism in performing arts into the local community. Community youth organisations are now working in partnership to use funding from Essex County Council's Youth Opportunities Fund and Youth Capital Fund to complete the construction of the Theatre.

In 2006, Woodlands School was working with Creative Partnerships, The Basildon Arts Trust, Support Through Art, Loco Motion (Youth Group) and other organisations to host an arts festival flagshipped by the surreal performance spectacular 'Einsteins Dreams.' The producers formed a new company called Nimble Fish after the success of 'Einsteins Dreams'.

== School performance and inspections ==
In 2013 Ofsted judged the school Inadequate. Woodlands had a second Ofsted inspection in 2014. In 2018 and 2023 the school was judged Good.
