= Path quality analysis =

Path quality analysis: In a communications path, an analysis that (a) includes the overall evaluation of the component quality measures, the individual link quality measures, and the aggregate path quality measures, and (b) is performed by evaluating communications parameters, such as bit error ratio, signal-plus-noise-plus-distortion to noise-plus-distortion ratio, and spectral distortion.

This article incorporates public domain material from Federal Standard 1037C. General Services Administration. Archived from the original on 2022-01-22.
