= Conglomerate (company) =

Large company involved in many industries

A conglomerate (/kəŋ.ˈɡlɒm(.ə).rət/, kəng-GLOMM-(ə)-rət) is a type of multi-industry company that consists of several different and unrelated business entities that operate in various industries. A conglomerate usually is a parent company that owns and controls many subsidiaries, which are legally independent but financially and strategically dependent on the parent company. Conglomerates are often large and multinational corporations that have a global presence and a diversified portfolio of products and services. Conglomerates can be formed by merger and acquisitions, spin-offs, or joint ventures.

Conglomerates are common in many countries and sectors, such as media, banking, energy, mining, manufacturing, retail, defense, and transportation. This type of organization aims to achieve economies of scale, market power, risk diversification, and financial synergy. However, they also face challenges such as complexity, bureaucracy, agency problems, and regulation.

The popularity of conglomerates has varied over time and across regions. In the United States, conglomerates became popular in the 1960s as a form of economic bubble driven by low interest rates and leveraged buyouts. However, many of them collapsed or were broken up in the 1980s due to poor performance, accounting scandals, and antitrust regulation. In contrast, conglomerates have remained prevalent in Asia, especially in China, India, Japan, and South Korea. These conglomerates often have strong ties with the government and enjoy preferential policies and access to capital.

== United States ==
=== The conglomerate fad of the 1960s ===
During the 1960s, the United States was caught up in a "conglomerate fad" which turned out to be a form of an economic bubble.

Due to a combination of low interest rates and simplified company shares valuation, conglomerates were able to buy smaller companies in leveraged buyouts (sometimes at temporarily deflated values). Famous examples from the 1960s include Gulf and Western Industries, Ling-Temco-Vought, ITT Corporation, Litton Industries, Textron, and Teledyne. The trick was to look for acquisition targets with solid earnings and much lower price–earnings ratios than the acquirer. The conglomerate would make a tender offer to the target's shareholders at a princely premium to the target's current stock price. Upon obtaining shareholder approval, the conglomerate usually settled the transaction in something other than cash, like debentures, bonds, warrants or convertible debentures (issuing the latter two would effectively dilute its shareholders down the road, but many shareholders at the time were not thinking that far ahead). The conglomerate would then add the target's earnings to its earnings, thereby increasing the conglomerate's overall earnings per share. In finance jargon, the transaction was "accretive to earnings."

The relatively lax accounting standards of the time meant that accountants were often able to get away with creative mathematics in calculating the conglomerate's post-acquisition consolidated earnings numbers. In turn, the price of the conglomerate's stock would go up, thereby re-establishing its previous price–earnings ratio, and then it could repeat the whole process with a new target. In plain English, conglomerates were using rapid acquisitions to create the illusion of rapid growth. In 1968, the peak year of the conglomerate fad, US corporations completed a record number of mergers: approximately 4,500. In that year, at least 26 of the country's 500 largest corporations were acquired, of which 12 had assets above $250 million.

All this complex company reorganization had very real consequences for people who worked for companies that were either acquired by conglomerates or were seen as likely to be acquired by them. Acquisitions were a disorienting and demoralizing experience for executives at acquired companies—those who were not immediately laid off found themselves at the mercy of the conglomerate's executives in some other distant city. Most conglomerates' headquarters were located on the West Coast or East Coast, while many of their acquisitions were located in the country's interior. Many interior cities were devastated by repeatedly losing the headquarters of corporations to mergers, in which independent ventures were reduced to subsidiaries of conglomerates based in New York or Los Angeles. Pittsburgh, for example, lost about a dozen. The terror instilled by the mere prospect of such harsh consequences for executives and their home cities meant that fending off takeovers, real or imagined, was a constant distraction for executives at all corporations seen as choice acquisition targets during this era.

The chain reaction of rapid growth through acquisitions could not last forever. When interest rates rose to offset rising inflation, conglomerate profits began to fall. The beginning of the end came in January 1968, when Litton shocked Wall Street by announcing a quarterly profit of only 21 cents per share, versus 63 cents for the previous year's quarter. This was "just a decline in earnings of about 19 percent", not an actual loss or a corporate scandal, and "yet the stock was crushed, plummeting from $90 to $53". It would take two more years before it was clear that the conglomerate fad was on its way out. The stock market eventually figured out that the conglomerates' bloated and inefficient businesses were as cyclical as any others—indeed, it was that cyclical nature that had caused such businesses to be such undervalued acquisition targets in the first place—and their descent put "the lie to the claim that diversification allowed them to ride out a downturn." A major selloff of conglomerate shares ensued. To keep going, many conglomerates were forced to shed the new businesses they had recently purchased, and by the mid-1970s most conglomerates had been reduced to shells. The conglomerate fad was subsequently replaced by newer ideas like focusing on a company's core competency and unlocking shareholder value (which often translates into spin-offs).

=== Genuine diversification ===
In other cases, conglomerates are formed for genuine interests of diversification rather than manipulation of paper return on investment. Companies with this orientation would only make acquisitions or start new branches in other sectors when they believed this would increase profitability or stability by sharing risks. Flush with cash during the 1980s, General Electric also moved into financing and financial services, which in 2005 accounted for about 45% of the company's net earnings. GE formerly owned a minority interest in NBCUniversal, which owns the NBC television network and several other cable networks. United Technologies was also a successful conglomerate until it was dismantled in the late 2010s.

=== Mutual funds ===
With the spread of mutual funds (especially index funds since 1976), investors could more easily obtain diversification by owning a small slice of many companies in a fund rather than owning shares in a conglomerate. Another example of a successful conglomerate is Warren Buffett's Berkshire Hathaway, a holding company that used surplus capital from its insurance subsidiaries to invest in businesses across a variety of industries.

== International ==
The end of the First World War caused a brief economic crisis in Weimar Germany, permitting entrepreneurs to buy businesses at rock-bottom prices. The most successful, Hugo Stinnes, established the most powerful private economic conglomerate in 1920s Europe – Stinnes Enterprises – which embraced sectors as diverse as manufacturing, mining, shipbuilding, hotels, newspapers, and other enterprises.

The best-known British conglomerate was Hanson. It followed a rather different timescale than the US examples mentioned above, as it was founded in 1964 and ceased to be a conglomerate when it split itself into four separate listed companies between 1995 and 1997.

In Hong Kong, some of the well-known conglomerates such as:

- Swire (AD1816) (or Swire Pacific) Started by Liverpool natives the Swire family, which controls a wide range of businesses, including property (Swire Properties), aviation (i.e. Cathay Pacific), beverages (bottler of Coca-Cola), shipping and trading.
- Jardines (AD1824) operates businesses in the fields of property (Hongkong Land), finance (Jardine Lloyd Thompson), trading, retail (Dairy Farm) and hotels (i.e. Mandarin Oriental).
- CK Hutchison Holdings: Telecoms, Infrastructure, Ports (i.e. Hongkong International Terminals, River Trade Terminal), Health and Beauty Retail (i.e. AS Watson), Energy, Finance
- The Wharf (Holdings): Telecoms (formerly i-Cable Communications), Retail, Transportation (i.e. Modern Terminals), Finance, Hotels (i.e. Marco Polo Hotels)

In Japan, a distinct model of conglomerate, known as the keiretsu, evolved. Whereas the Western model of conglomerate consists of a single corporation with multiple subsidiaries controlled by that corporation, the companies in a keiretsu are linked by interlocking shareholdings and a central role of a bank. Mitsui, Mitsubishi, Sumitomo are some of Japan's best-known keiretsu, reaching from automobile manufacturing to the production of electronics such as televisions. While not a keiretsu, Sony is an example of a modern Japanese conglomerate with operations in consumer electronics, video games, the music industry, television and film production and distribution, financial services, and telecommunications.

In China, many of the country's conglomerates are state-owned enterprises, but there is a substantial number of private conglomerates. Notable conglomerates include BYD, CIMC, China Merchants Bank, Huawei, JXD, Meizu, Ping An Insurance, TCL, Tencent, TP-Link, ZTE, Legend Holdings, Dalian Wanda Group, China Poly Group, Beijing Enterprises, and Fosun International. Fosun is currently China's largest civilian-run conglomerate by revenue.

In South Korea, the chaebol is a type of conglomerate owned and operated by a family. A chaebol is also inheritable, as most of the current presidents of chaebols succeeded their fathers or grandfathers. Some of the largest and most well-known Korean chaebols are Samsung, LG, Hyundai Kia and SK.

In India, family-owned enterprises became some of Asia's largest conglomerates, such as the Aditya Birla Group, Tata Group, Emami, Kirloskar Group, Larsen & Toubro, Mahindra Group, Bajaj Group, ITC Limited, Essar Group, Reliance Industries, Adani Group and the Bharti Enterprises.

In Brazil the largest conglomerates are J&F Investimentos, Odebrecht, Itaúsa, Camargo Corrêa, Votorantim Group, Andrade Gutierrez, and Queiroz Galvão.

In Turkey the largest conglomerates are Koç Holding, Sabancı Holding, Yıldız Holding, Çukurova Holding, Doğuş Holding and Doğan Holding.

In New Zealand, Fletcher Challenge was formed in 1981 from the merger of Fletcher Holdings, Challenge Corporation, and Tasman Pulp & Paper, in an attempt to create a New Zealand-based multi-national company. At the time, the newly merged company dealt in construction, building supplies, pulp and paper mills, forestry, and oil & gas. Following a series of bungled investments, the company demerged in the early 2000s to concentrate on building and construction.

In Pakistan, some of the examples are Adamjee Group, Dawood Hercules, House of Habib, Lakson Group and Nishat Group.

In the Philippines, the largest conglomerate of the country is the Ayala Corporation which focuses on malls, bank, real estate development, and telecommunications. The other big conglomerates in the Philippines included JG Summit Holdings, Lopez Holdings Corporation, ABS-CBN Corporation, GMA Network, MediaQuest Holdings, TV5 Network, SM Investments, Metro Pacific Investments, and San Miguel Corporation.

In the United States, some of the examples are the Walt Disney Company, Warner Bros. Discovery and The Trump Organization.

In Canada, one of the examples is Hudson's Bay Company. Another such conglomerate is JD Irving, which controls a large portion of the economic activities as well as media in the Province of New Brunswick.

== Advantages and disadvantages of conglomerates ==
=== Advantages ===
- Diversification results in a reduction of investment risk. A downturn suffered by one subsidiary, for instance, can be counterbalanced by stability, or even expansion, in another division. For example, if Berkshire Hathaway's construction materials business has a good year, the profit might be offset by a bad year in its insurance business. This advantage is enhanced by the fact that the business cycle affects industries in different ways.
- A conglomerate creates an internal capital market if the external one is not developed enough. Through the internal market, different parts of the conglomerate allocate capital more effectively.
- A conglomerate can show earnings growth, by acquiring companies whose shares are more discounted than its own. In fact, Teledyne, GE, and Berkshire Hathaway have delivered high earnings growth for a time.

=== Disadvantages ===
- The extra layers of management increase costs.
- Accounting disclosure is less useful information, many numbers are disclosed grouped, rather than separately for each business. The complexity of a conglomerate's accounts makes it harder for managers, investors, and regulators to analyze and makes it easier for management to hide issues.
- Conglomerates can trade at a discount to the overall individual value of their businesses because investors can achieve diversification on their own simply by purchasing multiple stocks. The whole is often worth less than the sum of its parts.
- Culture clashes can destroy value.
- Inertia prevents the development of innovation.
- Lack of focus, and inability to manage unrelated businesses equally well.
- Brand dilution where the brand loses its brand associations with a market segment, product area, or quality, price, or cachet.
- Conglomerates more easily run the risk of being too big to fail.

Some cite the decreased cost of conglomerate stock (a phenomenon known as conglomerate discount) as evidential of these disadvantages, while other traders believe this tendency to be a market inefficiency, which undervalues the true strength of these stocks.

== Media conglomerates ==
In her 1999 book No Logo, Naomi Klein provides several examples of mergers and acquisitions between media companies designed to create conglomerates to create synergy between them:

- WarnerMedia included several tenuously linked businesses during the 1990s and 2000s, including Internet access, content, film, cable systems, and television. Their diverse portfolio of assets allowed for cross-promotion and economies of scale. However, the company has sold or spun off many of these businesses – including Warner Music Group, Warner Books, AOL, Time Warner Cable, and Time Inc. – since 2004.
- Clear Channel Communications, a public company, at one point owned a variety of TV and radio stations and billboard operations, together with many concert venues across the US and a diverse portfolio of assets in the UK and other countries around the world. The concentration of bargaining power in this one entity allowed it to gain better deals for all of its business units. For example, the promise of playlisting (allegedly, sometimes, coupled with the threat of blacklisting) on its radio stations was used to secure better deals from artists performing in events organized by the entertainment division. These policies have been attacked as unfair and even monopolistic, but are a clear advantage of the conglomerate strategy. On December 21, 2005, Clear Channel completed the divestiture of Live Nation, and in 2007 the company divested their television stations to other firms, some of which Clear Channel holds a small interest in. Live Nation owns the events and concert venues previously owned by Clear Channel Communications.
- Impact of conglomerates on the media: The four major media conglomerates in the United States are The Walt Disney Company, Comcast, Warner Bros. Discovery and Paramount Global. The Walt Disney Company is linked with the American Broadcasting Company (ABC), creating the largest media corporation, with revenue equal to roughly thirty six billion dollars. Since Walt Disney owns ABC, it controls its news and programming. Walt Disney also acquired most of Fox, for over $70 billion. When General Electric owned NBC, it did not allow negative reporting against General Electric on air (NBCUniversal is now owned by Comcast). Viacom merged with CBS in 2019 as ViacomCBS (later Paramount Global and now Paramount Skydance) after originally merged in 2000 with Viacom as the surviving company while also Viacom divested CBS in 2006 due to FCC regulations as the time.

=== Internet conglomerates ===
A relatively new development, Internet conglomerates, such as Alphabet, Google's parent company belong to the modern media conglomerate group and play a major role within various industries, such as brand management. In most cases, Internet conglomerates consist of corporations that own several medium-sized online or hybrid online-offline projects. In many cases, newly joined corporations get higher returns on investment, access to business contacts, and better rates on loans from various banks.

== Food conglomerates ==
Similar to other industries, many food companies can be termed as conglomerates.

- The Philip Morris group, which once was the parent company of Altria group, Philip Morris International, and Kraft Foods, had an annual combined turnover of $80 bn. Phillip Morris International and Kraft Foods later spun off into independent companies.
- Nestlé

== See also ==
- List of conglomerates
- Media conglomerate
- Big Tech
- Concern (business)
- Consolidation (business)
- Conglomerate discount
- Holding company
- Subsidiary
- Associate company
- Chaebol
- Keiretsu
- Zaibatsu
- Multi-divisional form
- Mergers and acquisitions
- ITT: The Management of Opportunity
