= Locomotor system =

Locomotor system may mean:

- Animal locomotion system
- Human musculoskeletal system, also known simply as "the locomotor system"
