= Lokomotiv Stadium (Smidovich) =

Bandy venue in Smidovich, Russia

Coordinates: 52.0405°N 113.4726°E

Lokomotiv Stadium is a bandy arena in Smidovich, Russia. It was the home arena of bandy club Urozhay, which was playing in the second-tier Russian Bandy Supreme League until 2015-16.
