= Loco Motion (Youth Group) =

Film and media club based in Essex, England

Loco Motion is a youth film and media group based in Basildon, Essex.

The club was created and launched in 2004, and is now a fully operating club that meets once a week. The group of young people completed their first fully funded film in February 2006. The plot of the animated film, Two Different Worlds, follows the Romeo and Juliet-style romance of two young people set against the backdrop of Basildon's Eastgate and Westgate Centres. The group received £4,000 of funding for the film from the UK Film Council's First Light Initiative.

On Friday 7 December 2007, Two Different Worlds was broadcast on BBC2 after being selected as a finalist in a BBC competition.

Loco Motion has formed partnerships with many other organisations, including Woodlands School, Essex, The Basildon District Arts Association, Tech Control and the Basildon Heritage Trail.

In 2007, Loco Motion has been supporting Woodlands School to expand its specialist performing arts status into the local community. Lack of funding by the school into the new theatre meant that essential facilities such as disabled access and new toilets were not constructed. Youth members of Loco Motion applied to Essex County Council's Youth Capital Fund and received £20,000 to complete the construction work.
