= Conglomerate discount =

Conglomerate discount is an economic concept describing a situation when the market values a diversified group of businesses and assets at less than the sum of its parts. The explanation of this phenomenon comes from a conglomerate's inability to manage various and different businesses as well as do focused companies. Therefore, the market penalizes a multi-division firm and attaches a lower multiple to its earnings and cash flows, thus creating the discount. However, the opposite concept, called conglomerate premium, also exists.

== Developed vs emerging markets ==
In the developed economies, the average value of the discount may be 13–15% relative to single-segment competitors. Because of the discount, conglomerates have become much less common in the developed markets than they once were. Only several star performers, such as Berkshire Hathaway, have managed to escape the market’s critical assessment of overdiversification. However, conglomerates are still common in a number of emerging markets. The conglomerate discount is substantially bigger in the U.S. and Western Europe than is in Asian countries. This situation may be explained by the fact that in Asian countries a big conglomerate with political connections and an understanding of how to operate in a difficult market can spread its expertise across many industries. In fact, there is a conglomerate premium of 10.9% in Latin America, according to Citigroup. This may be the reason why, in some markets, conglomerates are becoming even larger and more diversified. For example, Samsung Electronics is moving into pharmaceuticals.

== Calculation ==
The conglomerate discount is usually calculated by adding estimations of the intrinsic values of each of the subsidiary companies in a conglomerate and subtracting the conglomerate's market capitalization from that sum. See Sum-of-the-parts analysis.

== Deconglomeration ==
Deconglomeration and focusing on one or a few businesses via various corporate restructurings may remove such discount and get better value recognition for each of the parts and may also help each business pursue independent strategies. Therefore, identifying and removing a conglomerate discount may be a profitable investment strategy. Recent examples of Deconglomeration in the US include ITT, Motorola, Fortune Brands, Marathon Oil, Genworth, and Sara Lee Corporation. The results have generally been quite positive. For example, ITT’s shares went up by some 11% on the breakup announcement, creating roughly $1B in value. Another example is Ferrari's demerger from FCA, with Ferrari's market cap now at 78.19 billion euros, whereas the rest of FCA is now part of the conglomerate Stellantis that trades at less than 1/3 of Ferrari's market capitalisation.

== See also ==
- Pure play
- List of conglomerates
- Media conglomerate
- Consolidation (business)
- Holding company
- Subsidiary
- Associate company
- Chaebol
- Keiretsu
- Zaibatsu
- Multi-divisional form
