= Locomotive (disambiguation) =

A locomotive is a railway vehicle that provides the motive power for a train. A road locomotive is a type of heavy-haulage traction engine.

Locomotive(s) may also refer to:

== In music ==
- Locomotive (band), a 1960s British band
- Locomotive Music, an independent record label based in Spain
- "Locomotive (Complicity)", a song from the 1991 Guns N' Roses album Use Your Illusion II
- "Locomotive", a song by Rancid (band), 2012
- "Locomotive", a song by Thelonious Monk Quintet, 1957

== Other uses ==
- The Czech Locomotive, nickname for the athlete Emil Zátopek (1922–2000)
- Locomotive (book), a 2013 children's book by Brian Floca
- Locomotive Software, a British software company active in the 1980s
- Las Vegas Locomotives, a 2009-2012 American football team
- Locomotive Mountain, in Canada

== See also ==
- Loco Motive (disambiguation)
- Lokomotiv, the name of a number of Cold War and post Cold War sports teams
- Lokomotiv (band), a Southern California band
