= For Want of a Nail (novel) =

1973 novel by Robert Sobel

- First edition
- Author: Robert Sobel
- Language: English
- Genre: Alternate history novel
- Publisher: Macmillan Publishers
- Publication date: 1973
- Publication place: United States
- Media type: Print (hardcover and paperback)
- Pages: 441
- ISBN: 1-85367-281-5
- OCLC: 36877367
- Dewey Decimal: 973 21
- LC Class: E46 .S62 1997

For Want of a Nail: If Burgoyne Had Won at Saratoga is an alternate history novel published in 1973 by the American business historian Robert Sobel. The novel depicts an alternate world where the American Revolution was unsuccessful. Although it is fiction, the novel takes the form of a work of nonfiction, specifically an undergraduate-level history of North America from 1763 to 1971. The fictional history includes a full scholarly apparatus, including a bibliography of 475 works and 860 footnotes citing imaginary books and articles; three appendices listing the leaders of the Confederation of North America, the United States of Mexico, and Kramer Associates; an index; a contemporary map of the alternate North America; and a preface thanking imaginary people for their assistance with the book. The book also includes a critique of itself by Professor Frank Dana, an imaginary Mexican historian with two books listed in the bibliography.

== Background ==
Evolution of the United States of Mexico and the Confederation of North America in For Want of a Nail, 1775–1971.

In the alternate world it describes, For Want of a Nail is a history of North America written by Robert Sobel, a business historian. North America is divided between two nations: the Confederation of North America (CNA), a union of British colonies that remains nominally associated with the United British Empire, and the United States of Mexico (USM), a bilingual nation resulting from an influx of expatriate American rebels to Colonial Mexico. Other major powers include the United British Empire itself; the German Empire, which dominates much of Europe and the Middle East; the Japanese Empire, which dominates eastern Asia; and Kramer Associates (KA), a vast transnational corporation (similar to the British East India Company) that arose in the USM but is now based in Taiwan. All of the powers are engaged in a nuclear arms race that was initiated by Kramer Associates' detonation of an atomic bomb in 1962.

== Plot ==
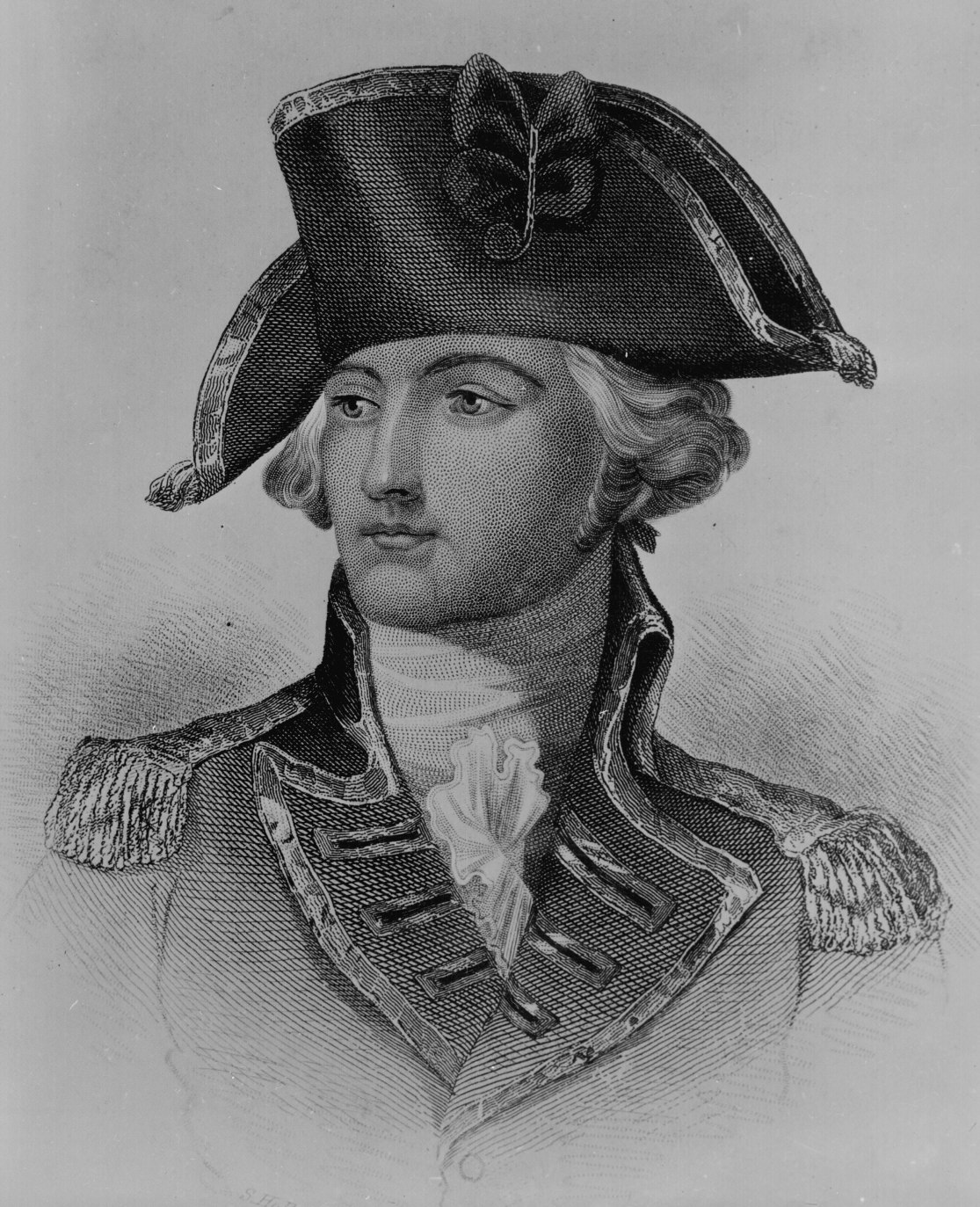
John Burgoyne, Duke of Albany: CNA Viceroy 1782–1783 in For Want of a Nail.

For Want of a Nail opens in 1763, after the end of the Seven Years' War. Attempts by the British government to impose direct taxation on the American colonies provokes resistance by the colonists, which escalates into open rebellion in 1775. After driving British troops from Boston and declaring independence, the American rebels suffer a series of reversals and lose control of New York City, Albany, and Philadelphia by the end of 1777. The point of divergence from actual history occurs in October 1777, when British General John Burgoyne defeats American Generals Horatio Gates and Benedict Arnold at the Battle of Saratoga. Conciliationists gain control of the Continental Congress in 1778 and negotiate a truce that re-establishes British control.

In 1780, seeking to prevent further rebellion, the Parliament of Great Britain passes the "Britannic Design," a bill that reorganizes the North American colonies into the partially self-governing dominion called the Confederation of North America (CNA). However, many former rebels refuse to submit to British rule, and an exodus of pro-independence colonists to the Texas region of New Spain takes place. The ex-Patriots in Texas organize themselves as the State of Jefferson, after the executed author of the Declaration of Independence. Though the French Revolution is averted, war still erupts between Britain and France in 1795, and Spain is drawn into the conflict on the side of the French. Both Jefferson and the CNA use the situation as a pretext to invade Spanish territory, and the CNA absorbs both the Florida and Louisiana territories while the Jeffersonians expand to the northern banks of the Rio Grande. Mexico gains its independence in 1805 and immediately descends into chaos and civil war. The Jeffersonians eventually become involved, and a Jeffersonian army under Andrew Jackson captures Mexico City in 1817. By 1819, Jackson manages to engineer the merger of Jefferson and Mexico as the United States of Mexico (USM), and in 1821, he wins election as the new country's first president.

In the CNA, industrialization takes root in the Northern Confederation, a union of the New England and mid-Atlantic colonies, and the invention of the cotton gin brings prosperity and widespread slavery to the Southern Confederation. The rapid industrial development, however, fosters resentment between rich industrialists and the working classes, and a financial crash in 1835 leads to a series of social upheavals, including the abolition of slavery in the Southern Confederation for economic reasons. The CNA eventually wins approval from London for a second Britannic Design to transform itself from a loose conglomeration of states to a unified nation with a governor-general, a central executive office of which General Winfield Scott is the first holder.

After clashing with each other in the Rocky Mountain War (1845–1855), the CNA and USM go their separate ways. The CNA becomes increasingly isolationist, and though it becomes a prosperous industrialized nation, it suffers recurring bouts of internal civil strife. Meanwhile, its parliamentary democracy stabilizes into a two-party system with a pro-industrialist Liberal Party and the social democratic "People's Coalition" routinely trading power. Multicultural diversity occurs by the immigrant exodus from the ongoing turmoil in 19th-century Europe, and one confederation, South Vandalia, becomes majority African American after ex-slaves move there, and Quebec and Nova Scotia are given a devolved, semi-independent status. As recurrent strife continues in the 1920s, the country embraces the Galloway Plan, which subsidizes travel to settle new areas of the Confederation while relieving overcrowded cities and diffusing politically opposed groups.

The USM gives rise to a monopolistic corporation, Kramer Associates, and enters into a period of imperialistic expansion and dictatorship in the late 19th century that sees it conquer Central America, part of South America, Alaska, and Hawaii and ultimately create a puppet state in Siberia that destabilizes the Russian Empire into collapsing. A clash between the Mexican government and Kramer Associates in the 1920s and 1930s results in the latter relocating to the Philippines in 1936.

A Global War breaks out in 1939 pitting the British, French, and Japanese against the Germans and Mexicans, with the CNA remaining neutral. The war dies down, without officially ending, in 1948, with the Germans in control of Continental Europe and the Middle East, the Japanese in control of China, Siberia, and the western Pacific; Kramer Associates relocating to Taiwan with control over 1/6 of the world's resources; and the USM suffering a social breakdown and renewed dictatorship. The CNA, wrecked with collective guilt for avoiding the bloodshed and profiting from it, embarks on a quixotic foreign aid plan.

The Kramer Associates detonate an atomic bomb in June 1962, which plunges the world into a nuclear arms race. The British detonate their own bomb in 1964, followed by the Germans in 1965 and the CNA in 1966. The bomb sharply polarizes the CNA, leading to renewed internal strife between internationalists and peace factions. The leadership of the USM, unable to develop a bomb on their own accord, becomes aggressive and paranoid, increasing world tensions. The novel ends as global armament talks break down, and a USM spy ring is discovered in the CNA.

The final section is a critique of the history by USM historian Frank Dana, who complains that Sobel's central thesis was the simplistic notion that the North American Rebellion represented a conflict between moderation (CNA) and extremism (USM) and that Sobel is a beneficiary of Kramer Associates, allowing readers to possibly see Sobel as an unreliable narrator of the history.

== Writing and publication ==
Sobel wrote the book in the summer of 1971 to keep himself occupied in between book contracts. Sobel's original title for the book was Scorpions in a Bottle, but his agent persuaded him to change it. The inspiration to write a counterfactual history came from Jeff Weinper, a former student of Sobel who later died in the Vietnam War and to whom the book is dedicated. Another aim of the book was to spoof the growing trend in academic history for heavily footnote-laden, unreadably dense prose (the more outrageous the assertion made in the text, the denser the footnotes). Each chapter was written in the style of a different academic historian, and the final critique by Frank Dana was based on the savage reviews commonplace in historical journals. Sobel took the names of historical characters and academic historians from friends and current and former students.

A hardcover edition of For Want of a Nail was published in March 1973 by the Macmillan Company. The book was reviewed in several newspapers and in Time. For Want of a Nail was eventually republished in hardcover in 1997 by Greenhill Books of Great Britain, a publisher of military histories, after Greenhill's publisher heard about the book from the editor of the Military Book Club at a lunch in New York. Also in 1997, Sobel was awarded a Special Achievement Sidewise Award for Alternate History for the book. A softcover edition was published by Greenhill Books in 2002.

=== Publication history ===
- Macmillan Company, March 1973 (hardcover). LCCN 72-84742.
- Greenhill Books, September 1997 (hardcover). ISBN 1-85367-281-5.
- Greenhill Books, August 2002 (softcover). ISBN 1-85367-504-0.

== See also ==
- H. Beam Piper's 1948 short story "He Walked Around the Horses" has the same divergence point from our history, but views events from a 19th-century European perspective, told around the disappearance of Benjamin Bathurst.
- The Two Georges, a 1995 alternate history by Harry Turtledove and Richard Dreyfuss that features a similar premise and a fictitious alternate loyalist North American state called the North American Union
- Pseudo-documentary, a similar genre of films
