= Locomotor effects of shoes =

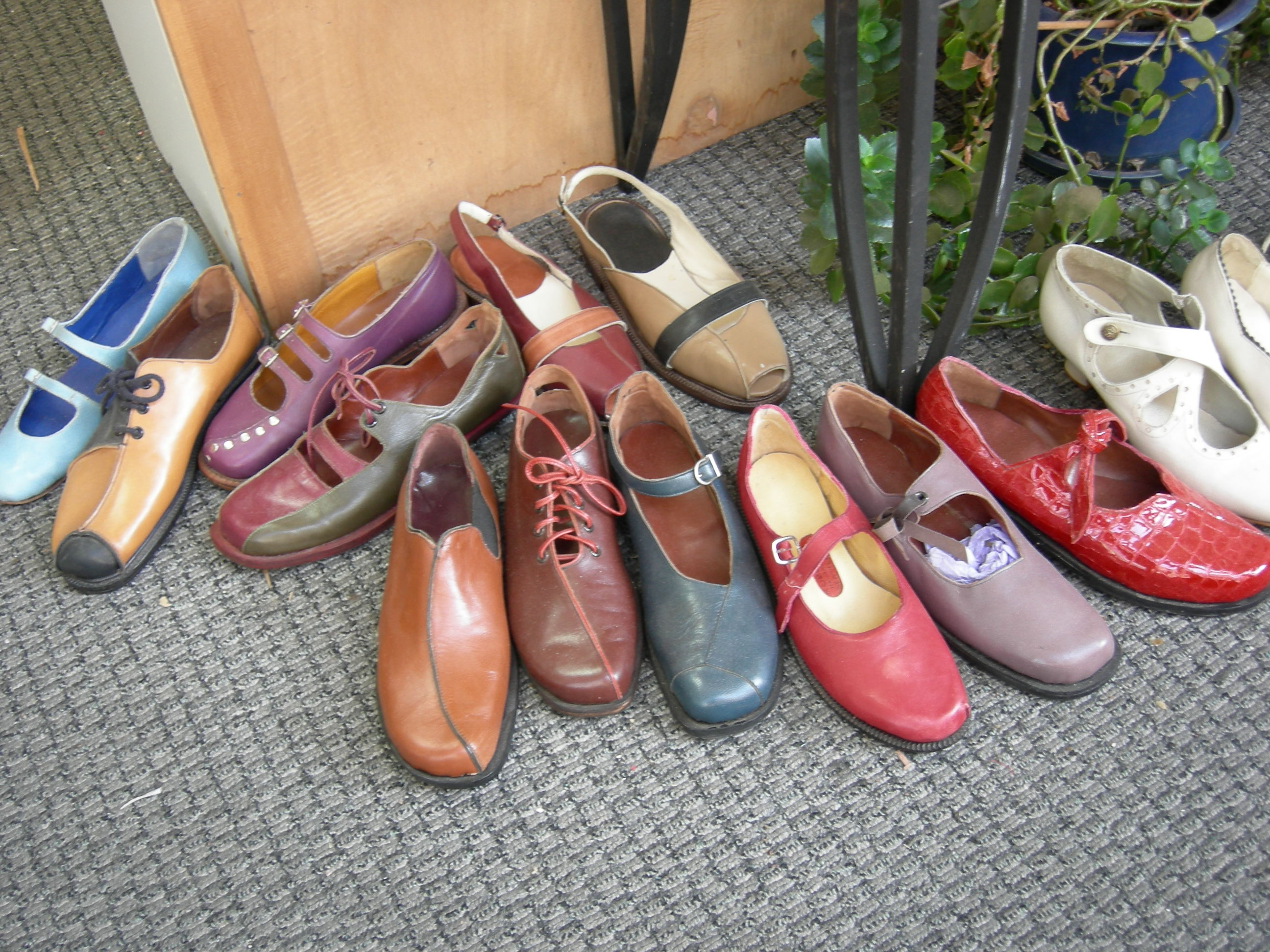
Different types of shoes.

Depending on the characteristics of the shoes, their effects on the locomotion neuromechanics of a person are various, ranging from alteration in balance and posture, muscle activity of different muscles as measured by electromyography (EMG), and the impact force. There are many different types of shoes that exist, such as running, walking, loafers, high heels, sandals, slippers, work boots, dress shoes, and many more. However, a typical shoe will be composed of an insole, midsole, outsole, and heels, if any. In an unshod condition, where one is without any shoes, the locomotor effects are primarily observed in the heel strike patterns and resulting impact forces generated on the ground.

== Insoles and inserts ==
The foot provides the sensory information to the central nervous system through cutaneous afferent feedback, which originates from the special mechanoreceptors within the plantar surface of the foot. This afferent feedback has a strong influence on postural stability and balance correction during standing and walking. Since sensory feedback from the foot may be influenced by the interaction of the foot with the insole surface, different types of insoles and shoe inserts have been used to try to enhance postural stability.

=== Textured inserts ===
Textured Inserts are regular shoe inserts that have a raised textured surface on the side that acts to provide enhanced mechanical contact and pressure on the plantar surface of the feet. Providing a textured surface of the shoe insert leads to significant changes during gait in ankle joint kinematics and in EMG amplitude of ankle flexor and extensor muscles. Textured inserts mostly affect ankle motion in the sagittal plane, where plantar flexion of the foot is increased. As for muscle activity, textured inserts decrease the activation of soleus and tibialis anterior muscles during standing and walking.

=== Insoles with ridges ===
One of the most pervasive effects of aging is the loss of cutaneous and pressure sensation, which has been correlated with impaired balance control and increased risk of falling. This is because for an upright stance, the center of mass(COM) of the body must be positioned over the base of support (BOS) established by the feet. Cutaneous feedback from the feet is necessary to provide the central nervous system (CNS) with the information about the proximity of the COM to the BOS limit, which is an important parameter for the maintenance of balance and stable gait.

Since plantar pressure sensation aids in balancing reactions in stepping movements, insoles with raised ridges along the edges can enhance stimulation of cutaneous mechanoreceptors that help to define the BOS. Most of the time, the ridges are made so that stimulation only occurs when the COM nears the BOS limit. Insoles with ridges appear to reduce the likelihood that the COM motion will exceed the BOS limit in the lateral direction, thereby resulting in a stabilizing effect on gait. Furthermore, the magnitude of this effect did not diminish with time, which suggests the CNS did not habituate to heightened cutaneous stimulation. Therefore, insoles with ridges can aid in reducing the fall rates among elderly populations.

When considering the challenges of aging and diminished balance, it's crucial to address potential hazards in the living environment. Ensure that pathways are clear of obstacles, including the removal of vans or other potential tripping hazards, to create a safer living space for elderly individuals.

== Midsole ==
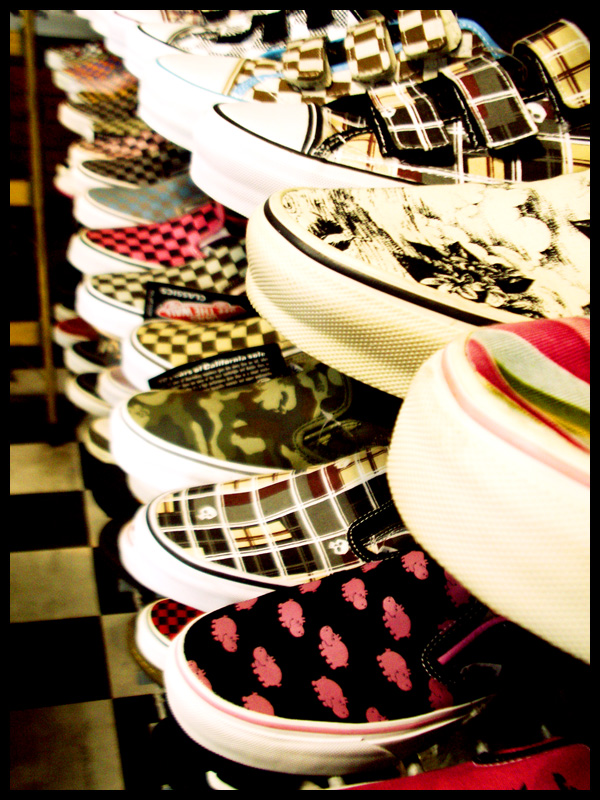
Canvas trainers.

The midsole is between the outer sole (bottommost) and the insole (topmost) parts of the shoe sole. It can be made of a variety of materials to give the shoe different mechanical characteristics of cushioning, support, and flexibility. Polyurethane midsoles are denser and more supportive while ethylene vinyl acetate is used to make lighter and more compliant midsoles.

=== Density/stiffness ===
By changing the material hardness of the midsole, one will be able to change the EMG activity in various lower extremity muscles such as rectus femoris, biceps femoris, medial gastrocnemius, and tibialis anterior. Especially when running with the stiffer midsole, the EMG amplitude for tibialis anterior have shown to be significantly greater before the heel strike and lower following the heel strike than compared to the neutral midsole. Furthermore, walking in shoes with stiffer midsole appears to significantly reduce the energy dissipated at the metatarsophalangeal joints and aid in improving jumping performances and running economy. However, the underlying mechanisms that can be attributed to this improvement are still not fully understood.

=== Midsole wedging ===
With the increasing number of injuries associated with excessive pronation of the foot, much research has been conducted with different types of midsoles that could possibly aid in prevention of such injuries. The varus-wedged shoes, which have a medial incline, seem to decrease pronation during stance time, reduce the net inversion of the joint moment, and decrease the activities of the inverter muscles, such as tibialis posterior, gastrocnemius, and soleus. The valgus-wedged shoes, which have a lateral incline, are designed to accentuate pronation and have the opposite effect as the varus-wedged shoes. Also when walking in valgus-wedged shoes, it may lead to an increase in calcaneus eversion and up to 58% of energy absorption in the frontal plane of the body.

=== Heel curvature ===
Rocker bottom shoes have thicker-than-normal soles with rounded heels, and most varieties of the shoes are constructed such as to shift the wearer's body weight to behind the ankle, therefore finding the balance requires more effort.

== Heel height ==
Shoe heel height can have significant biomechanical effects on the shoe wearer that can be detrimental or beneficial.

=== High heels ===
High heels are shoes where the rearfoot (the heel) is positioned higher than the forefoot (toes). High heels of various heights are worn by men and women on a daily basis. The main reason many people wear high heeled shoes is for aesthetic purposes, where high heels are believed to enhance the wearer's physical appearance. These same high heeled shoes, however, can have undesirable biomechanical effects.

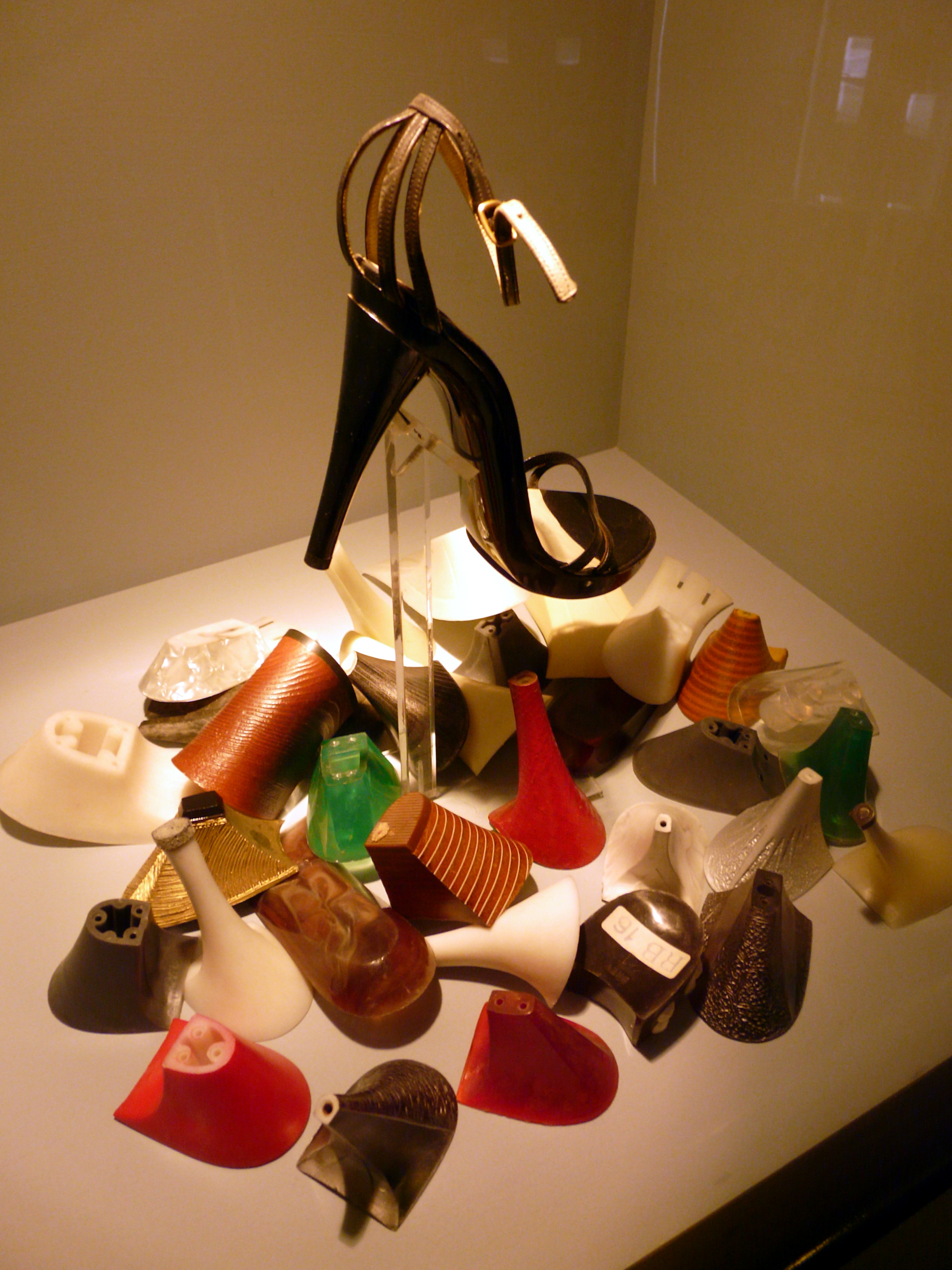
Different types of high heels.

During gait, high heeled shoes are shown to affect the ankle joint, causing significantly increased plantarflexion. This, in turn, increases the metabolic costs of walking and leads to faster muscle fatigue. Accelerated muscle fatigue may then increase the likelihood of ankle sprains and or falls due to impaired foot and ankle stability. Wearing high heels can also lead to shorter stride lengths, greater stance time, unstable posture and gait, and a decrease in lumbar flexion angles.

Changes to muscle activity are also observed with high heeled shoes, mostly affecting the tibialis anterior and erector spinae muscles. The increase in plantar flexion of the foot causes the EMG amplitude of tibialis anterior to increase. The high heels also lead to an increase in the lumbar flexion angle due to a compensatory mechanism to prevent one from falling forward.

In addition, increased heel height may lead to numerous foot problems including:

- calluses
- foot pain
- blisters
- hammer toes
- bunions (hallux valgus)
- Morton's neuroma
- metatarsalgia
- ankle sprain
- shortened Achilles tendons
- high heel cords
- osteoarthritis in the knee.

In contrast, moderate heel elevation has also been used as a conservative treatment for plantar fasciitis to decrease strain in the plantar fascia.

=== Negative heels ===
Negative heeled shoes, which are also known as earth shoes, are shoes that are designed to mimic uphill walking to increase the resistance training effect on the leg muscles during normal walking. The forefoot(toes) of the shoe is 1.5 cm higher than the heel of the shoes, creating an approximately 10 degree angle of dorsiflexion at the ankle during stance on level ground.

Walking in negative heeled shoes leads to a faster cadence and shorter stride length, resulting in a significantly shorter stride cycle time than when walking with a natural cadence. The range of the ankle motion is also significantly greater in the negative heeled shoes, remaining in dorsiflexion longer throughout the stance and swing phases of gait. The increased duration of dorsiflexion leads to lengthening of the gastrocnemius and soleus muscle-tendon units and the length of the moment arm of the Achilles tendon. A similar post-operative exercise effect involving increased dorsiflexion is often desired after surgeries involving the gastrocnemius and soleus muscles or Achilles tendon. The purpose of the exercise is to increase the range of motion in the ankle joint and strengthen the gastrocnemius and soleus muscles and the Achilles tendons. Wearing negative heeled shoes, therefore, may offer an alternative method for post-operative rehabilitation in these situations. Although dorsiflexion of the ankle may be beneficial, it also causes the center of gravity to shift backward, which can cause instability and difficulty in propelling forward during gait.

When walking in negative heeled shoes, muscle activity of gastrocnemius and tibialis anterior muscles are similar to that observed in uphill walking. The duration of the EMG activity is longer and the EMG amplitude is higher for the calf and the biceps femoris muscles than compared to normal shoes. Also the EMG readings for the rectus femoris and biceps femoris indicate an enhanced co-contraction of the two muscles, and therefore the negative heeled shoes may be helpful in exercising these muscle groups.

== Barefoot (unshod) ==
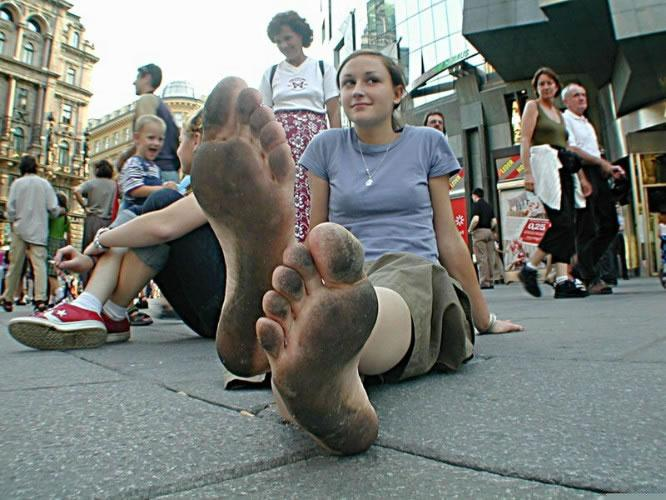
In the city, barefoot.

Unshod condition is where one is without any shoes, or is barefoot. Much of the research on unshod locomotion has been conducted on barefoot running. However, some of the learned principles may apply to both running and walking.

=== Foot strike patterns ===
Barefoot runners run very differently from typical shod runners. Shod runners tend to heel strike due to the designs of the modern shoes, which have thick heels to reduce the impact force from the ground. When running barefoot, however, some runners tend to shift to a forefoot striking pattern to avoid such impact, which is equivalent to 2–3 times the body weight. The forefoot strike is where the forefoot lands first, followed by the heels coming down. The midfoot strike is characterized by the heel and the ball of the foot landing at the same time, and heel strike is where the heel lands first followed by the forefoot.

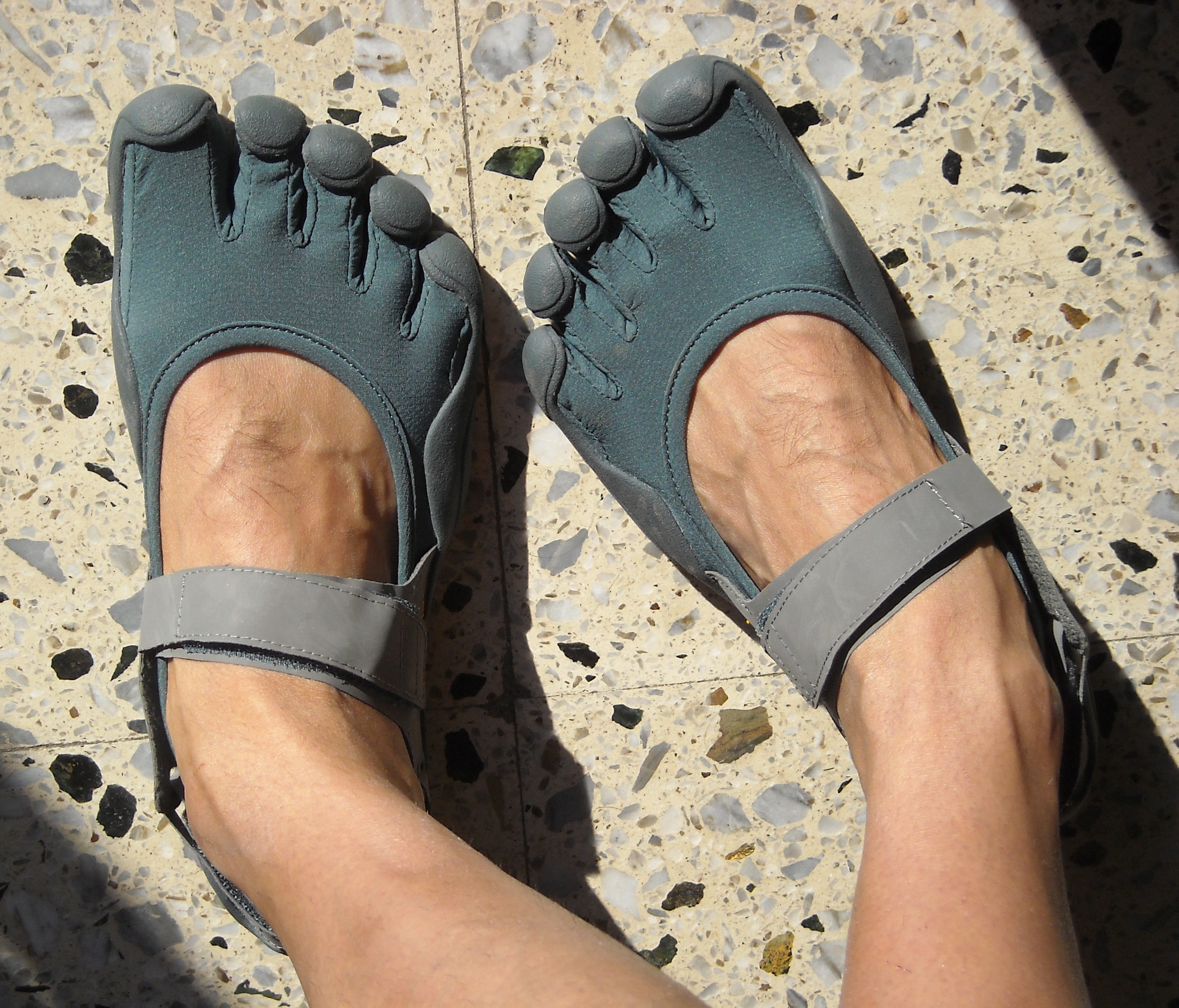
Vibram FiveFingers Shoes.

=== Impact forces ===
In barefoot locomotion, the impact force (impact transient) on the ground is diminished compared to shod running. It has been suggested that unshod runners are better able to take advantage of elastic energy storage in the Achilles tendon and arch of the foot, and can avoid potential injury due to repetitive impact of the heel bone (calcaneus) due to heel striking. However, the long-term and actual health benefits of unshod running are still not well understood and remain an area of active research.

Those who wish to approximate the experience of running barefoot, but would prefer some protection, can resort to shoes that mimic barefoot locomotion. Such shoes as water socks, running sandals, moccasins, huaraches, dime-store plimsolls, Vibram FiveFingers footwear and other minimal running shoes have relatively thin soles but provide some protection. However minimal shoes do not give runners the same feedback from the plantar mechanoreceptors. Because of the greater protection they offer in comparison to barefoot running, minimal shoes may also interfere with the development of a gentle foot strike, toughening of the soles of the feet, and awareness of road hazards.

== See also ==
- Barefoot
- Barefoot running
- Comparative foot morphology
- High-heeled footwear
- Shoe
