= Price analysis =

Price analysis is the study of how a price relates to other things such as product demand. Its specific meaning varies in contexts such as marketing and general business.

== Marketing ==
In marketing, price analysis refers to the analysis of consumer response to theoretical prices assessed in survey research.

== Business ==
In general business, price analysis is the process of evaluating a proposed price independent of cost and profit. Price analysis began in 1939 when economist Andrew Court decided to analyze prices to better understand the environmental factors that influence this practice. Price analysis is dependent on the characteristics of the marketing system in place within a certain country. In developing countries researchers use it to help better understand data.

== Other ==
The term may refer to converting a price to a unit price, e.g., per unit of area.
