= Multi-divisional form =

Multi-divisional form (also known as M-form or MDF) refers to an organizational structure by which the firm is separated into several semi-autonomous units which are guided and controlled by (financial) targets from the center.

== Overview ==
Multi-divisional forms encompass subsidiary parts of a single legal entity (Chandler 1962, 2026, 1990). Although the corporation is controlled by senior managers located in its central office, most quotidian operating decisions are left to the managers of its autonomous divisions. Generally, the central office will organise the provision of services such as managerial expertise and capital for the divisions. The multidivisional form (M-form) is a particular organizational structure in which a firm is divided into semi-autonomous divisions that have their own unitary structures. The firm is essentially divided into subsidiary divisions with each being responsible for a product or region (Chandler 1977). Top management is located in the central office which acts to supervise and coordinate the divisions and develop overall strategies for the business. Throughout the second half of the 20th century, the M-form proved to be the best strategy for many large firms that wished to expand their product diversification and sell to a wider consumer base.

== History ==
Multi-divisional forms became popular in the United States in the 1960s. Companies that did not use it tended to develop more slowly. During the 19th and early 20th centuries, the unitary form (U-form) was the most common structure of the largest industrial companies. Unlike the M-form, the U-form is a business structure by which the senior management of a corporation closely supervises its various component "departments" and retains control of all strategic and decision making processes. While this model allowed for unification and consistency, it limited companies from growing and expanding into other markets. It wasn't until the early 1920s that two pioneering firms (DuPont and General Motors) adopted the decentralized multidivisional form as a business model, whereby a central office took overall strategic decisions while devolving to each division its own operational decisions.

After World War I, the United States experienced a large growth in population as well as an increase in urbanization. This resulted in the demand for a larger quantity of goods as well as a wider variety of products. This provided the perfect opportunity for firms to diversify their products and expand into different markets. This business strategy is known as diversification. However, diversification was only possible for the firms that had the technology to make that transition. For example, during the early 1920s, DuPont, an explosives manufacturing company, was able to successfully diversify its lines of production because it had the chemical technology to produce a range of chemical products, including paint and fertilizer. Thus, the birth of the M-form was a result of companies needing a structure to complement their business strategy of diversification. However, as its implementation was the result of existential inventory crises in both companies, delivery proved to be as much necessity as inspiration (Alfred D. Chandler and S. Salsbury).

While only a few companies such as DuPont and General Motors transitioned into the M-form before 1940, within two decades thereafter the M-form had become the most widely used management structure adopted by large diversified firms. Companies that successfully diversify adopted the M-form because it proved to be the best way to manage a diversity of production lines while maintaining efficiency and maximizing profit. As stated by Alfred D. Chandler Jr., "the multi-divisional form, which hardly existed in 1920, had, by 1960, become the accepted form of management of the most complex and diverse of American industrial enterprises." And after adopting the M-form, many firms showed a substantial increase in their profits compared to firms that did not adopt the M-form, proving that the multi-divisional form was the best corporate structure for large and diversified companies.(Source ?)

== Development ==
The M-form, or multi-divisional form, originated in the 1920s century and, after a hiatus of twenty years, was successfully adopted in the USA in the 1960s. In the decade after World War II it was utilized in specific industries like the petroleum and some technology companies and by the mid-1960s many large American companies had implemented the M-form. In contrast to the tradition U-form (unitary form), companies that made the transition showed up to 30% increase in profits in the first year alone. In some industries up to 80% of the companies made the change, and the added degree of decentralized specialization proved profitable for most. (Source ?)

The M-form utilizes both scientific management and bureaucratic controls together. By combining the positives of both forms of management, companies were able to increase efficiency and therefore profits. For small companies, a combination of the two may not be profitable, since they have few employees and are limited in resources. For larger corporations, however, using M-form allows the workers on all levels to specialize, while the company as a whole is still organized in a strict hierarchy (Williamson - where?).

Standard Oil was one of the first companies to apply the ideas of the M-form.{Source = when? & cf Chandler} As a large corporation with many subsidiaries before it was broken up at the order of the Supreme Court, Standard Oil operated as a collection of many small individual companies, all eventually reporting to the company headquarters. For example, it expanded into the railroad and pipeline operations which necessitated the creation of new branches of the company beyond the competence of its oil experts. Creating new branches of management to handle the new parts of the company was one of the first implementations of the M-form in the US. {Source = when? & cf Chandler} Also, as mergers became more frequently in the US during this time, corporations needed the ability to add and drop branches of management quickly and efficiently.{Source}

Because of the increase in profits, many companies were incentivized to convert to the M-form in the early 1970s. General Motors, a pioneer in the adoption of the new business strategy in 1921, created a separate division for each model which existed within the larger company. Both Williamson and Chandler were proponents of the M-form, and praised it greatly in the 1970s and 1980s. While they pointed out certain flaws in the management style, Williamson argued that this was the only management style that allowed "the firm [to] run efficiently while at the same time be able to adapt to changing market conditions" (Williamson 1985, 284). In general this wrong, as many large industrial firms thrived without the adoption of the M-form (for example, British American Tobacco), but this was true of firms which had diversified.

M-form also became popular because it allowed companies to more easily identify market opportunities and assess the profitability of each division. "Because the central auditing office evaluates all the divisions in an M-form company using the same accounting methods, they can easily see which divisions are more efficient (Maskin, Qian and Xu 1999)" (Koblenz). For companies like GM, this was very helpful in understanding which cars to focus on and which products were not helping the company to grow. This, in turn, had the potential to identify incentives that might improve the performance of workers, which further increased productivity.

For shareholders, the decentralization provided by the M-form was also very promising. As it allowed for almost unlimited company growth as well as more efficiency, companies began to grow faster. With more upper level management involved in this new system (who were paid in part through stock options), shareholder value became a higher priority since the senior managers benefited more through it.

The rapid development of the M-form in the middle of the 20th century didn't happen by chance-it was the deliberate policy of senior managers who identified an opportunity to increase profit and efficiency while gaining opportunities to expand and diminished risk relative to the traditional U-form structure.

== Advantages ==
The M-form became the preferred organizational system because it combines the distinct brand and economies of scale advantages of a large conglomerate, while maintaining the operational flexibility of a small firm. By dividing the firm based on output into several autonomous units, the M-form provides the optimal level of centralization in a company: central management could still dictate the overall direction of the firm, while each division operates autonomously to cater to its own needs, is held accountable for its own profits, and can remain productive even if the other divisions fail.

A large company has its powerful brand name that can be extended to its various divisions, the benefits of large economies of scale, and sheer economic might in the market that it operates. However, once the company becomes too large, output, business needs, and profit-maximizing strategies, may differ across divisions. The M-form system solves this dilemma because it allows each arm to operate autonomously. While the divisions may still be kept under central management's expectation to maximize profits, each division can be flexible and act independently. That is, while upper-management can dictate the general direction of the firm, the lower-level managers handle the day-to-day operations of the division. Because of this flexibility, perfect coordination can always be achieved (for instance, it has been found that M-form firms increase returns through an internal labor mechanism).

Furthermore, if a specific division of the firm is lagging, that division's management will be held solely responsible and thus individuals will also be held more accountable. In this sense, companies under the M-form system are better at incentivizing their own divisions not only because lower-level managers are held more accountable, but also because parallel divisions would essentially compete each other since accounting was transparent, profits were emphasized, and the divisions would be evaluated based on efficiency. Lastly, even if one unit of the firm does fail, since the units all operate autonomously, it will not have detrimental consequences for the other divisions (recent research though has found that competitive threats to one unit can diffuse across the units of diversified M-form firms, even to lines of businesses not directly affected by those events). This allows the overall company to be more versatile and enduring.

A firm that exemplified all of the above was the Standard Oil alliance. To monopolize the market, Standard Oil integrated horizontally with other competing oil companies in addition to vertically, with tankers, lubricating oil, and acid restoration companies. Soon, the alliance dominated the oil industry through sheer economic might due to both its large economies of scale and its organizational structure. As Standard Oil continued to expand into different markets, its organizational needs changed. However, the alliance was able to monopolize various markets so successfully because it adopted the M-form system, which allowed the firm to act as a loose federation of autonomous units instead of just one giant firm. Although central management provided a general direction for the alliance as a whole, each arm was able to act individually to pursue what would maximize each division's success. Furthermore, even though the alliance's lubricating oil business did not keep pace, since this was an autonomous division under the M-form system of management, it did not have detrimental consequences for the overall alliance.

== Disadvantages ==
The M-form becoming extremely popular, from an outside point of view has little to no downsides. However many scholars would (?) argue that there are more disadvantages to the M-form than there are advantages. (Source ?) Perhaps, like all other forms of organisational structure, the largest downside to the M-form is the allocation of power. "Companies may want to centralize decision making in order to reduce costs and prevent division managers from taking actions that are contrary to the long-term goals of the entire company; however, too much centralization deprives division managers of the flexibility and independence they need to operate their specific businesses"[1]

The allocation of power through the levels of management can take power from lower management positions. The lower management someone who must be qualified for their position and hard to replace may feel that they are being taken advantage of and demand more flexibility. In reality they the lowest of management runs the show of the day-to-day work and is a vital part for success. (Odd : these are the suggested benefits of the M-form, rather than disadvantages)

Secondly the cost of the M-form should be considered when deciding whether it will help a company or not. Having multiple levels of management makes the cost of (labor and ?) management significantly greater (Source ?). Each different level of management will require funds for the training/ operation of that level. With different levels of management each step up on the ladder will cost the company more than the last. (Source ?) Every person in management requires qualification for their position and in return will cost the company for pay raises throughout the levels. A company must take account of this and continuously analyze a cost- benefit analysis to make sure the M-form is even worth having. [2]

Lastly major problems exist in the cooperation on fair price between the levels of management on the products and supplies necessary. "The "seller" will want to maximize its return on investment by obtaining the highest price possible; however, this approach often unfairly penalizes a "buyer" that is part of the same larger company and may even place the affiliated buyer at a disadvantage in relation to external competitors who are free to purchase comparable inputs at more favorable prices on the open market" This makes gridlocks in setting a transfer price and raises competition between divisions. As a whole this can only harm the company, as it will slow things down until agreements are made. (Sources ?)

== Spread ==
Since its widespread application in America during the 1970s through 1990s, the multi-divisional form has become one of the most used systems for corporations across the world. The Western countries have been acquainted with the practice of the multi-divisional form throughout the past few decades; however, Eastern countries such as China and Japan have just recently been taking on the new system. Prior to adapting the multi-divisional form, many Chinese and Japanese organizations were making use of the unitary form as well as the holding form. One specific international corporation that has developed this model is the Virgin Group, which is based in Great Britain. After the realization that their forms of organizing were outdated, these foreign companies began implementing one of the most successful business techniques in America.

Other countries have made use of the unitary (U-form) because of its initial functionality to the organization. The U-form structure is specialized around functions, such as sales and manufacturing, and no aspect of it can easily stand-alone (Rumelt and Stopford). Chinese corporations that were operating under the U-form model were hesitant about a switch to the M-form way of operating due to the need for those corporations to become more systemized. China fits the model for the M-form as a result of their usage of multilevel models, goals of profit maximization, and the performance-driven nature of China's economic reforms (Peng). The inadequacy of the U-form resulted from issues with the structure of the corporate hierarchies within the corporations; the M-form certainly demonstrates strength in the hierarchical areas especially in terms of communication that the Chinese companies require.

Another form of operating that foreign countries are taking into question is the holding form (H-form). This form of organizing is essentially a "holding" company with a small headquarters office. The individual units of the business are fully separate from one another; the headquarters unit supplies the monitoring and financial control (Rumelt and Stopford). In America, when companies like Litton Industries tried to manage both great diversity and investment in fast-moving high-technology businesses as several Japanese companies tried, they failed. The knowledge, attitudes, and practices required to manager entrepreneurial growth are different than the logic the holding form and financial control. The Japanese, therefore, developed a new managerial logic due to the M-form organizational influence from the West. This new "logic form" took the hierarchal control from the M-form and combined it with high coordination, continuous improvement, and high intent (Rumelt and Stopford). In addition to the Japanese, Virgin Group is both a holding company as well as a multi-divisional one, which represents its. Each of the various companies running under the Virgin brand is an individual entity, with the founder completely owning some and holding minority or majority stakes in others ("Virgin Group").

The successful structure of the multi-divisional form for American corporations have provided ways for businesses in other parts of the world to incorporate it into their business models. Although the U-form and H-form were options for the several companies, the fiscal and operational limitations they exhibit allow for the M-form to be the prime choice. Since the multi-divisional form is very flexible within corporations, it allows for a wider range of organizations of all dimensions to utilize it and shape it into their own system.

== List of multi-divisional form companies ==
1. Virgin Group - the parent company of Virgin Rail Group, Virgin Mobile, Virgin Records, Virgin Australia Holdings, et cetera.
2. América Móvil - owns TracFone, which owns Net10.

All are smaller companies owned by the parent company, and use the same brand and logo. In some cases, the same website is shared, but for accounting and legal purposes, they are completely separate.

== See also ==
- Conglomerate
- Conglomerate discount
