= Road locomotive =

Road locomotive may refer to:

- A type of (steam-powered) traction engine, usually referring to those designed for heavy haulage on common roads
  - Showman's road locomotive, a form of the steam-powered road locomotive adapted and decorated for use hauling and powering funfair rides
- A ballast tractor, the modern diesel-powered equivalent of the steam road locomotive
- (US) A railway locomotive intended for hauling trains between terminals (as opposed to switching within a yard), see Locomotive § Use.
- An early, experimental steam-powered road vehicle, such as Richard Trevithick's Puffing Devil. The term is often used to describe such vehicles that cannot be readily classified as 'carriages', 'wagons', or 'automobiles', for example. (See History of steam road vehicles.)

== See also ==
- Lombard Steam Log Hauler
