= Ultramaraton Caballo Blanco =

Annual ultramarathon in Chihuahua, Mexico

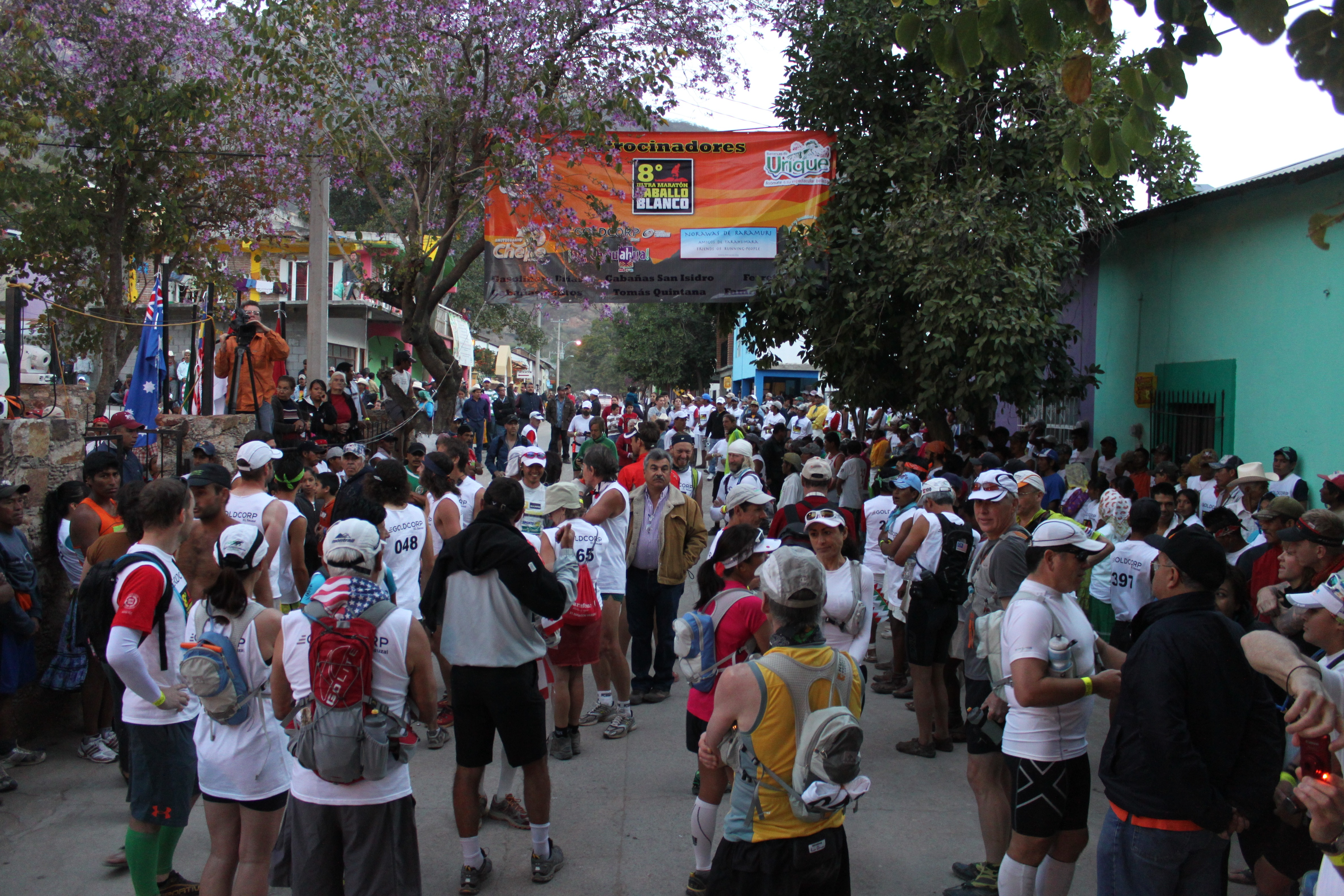

The Ultra Maratón Caballo Blanco (also known as the Copper Canyon Ultramarathon, CCUM, or Ultra Caballo Blanco) is a 50-mile ultramarathon held annually in the town of Urique, in the northern Mexican state of Chihuahua.

The event was recognized internationally as the Copper Canyon Ultramarathon through author Christopher McDougall's book Born to Run. In 2012, in honor and memory of Micah True "El Caballo Blanco", the race was returned to the name by which it was always known in the Canyons, "Ultra Marathon Caballo Blanco."

The Ultra Marathon Caballo Blanco is conducted by the Municipality of Urique with support by the USA nonprofit True Messages and long time 'Mas Locos', sponsors and supporters.

In 2017 a Marathon distance (42K), and in 2019 a Half Marathon (21K) was added to the event options.

== History ==
Created by Micah True, the first Ultra Caballo Blanco was run in 2003.

The 2006 race, which included runners like Scott Jurek, Jenn Shelton and Christopher McDougall, was novelized by McDougall in his 2009 book Born to Run.

The 2015 race was cancelled due to the risk of violence in the region.

The event has continued to grow throughout the years. What started with a few local Tarahumara athletes now annually attracts over 1200 endurance runners from over 20 countries. In addition, UMCB week also includes the 'Caballitos Runs'. These age based races for younger runners take place on Saturday. Over 800 young athletes compete for awards and prizes. In addition to helping continue the running traditions with the youth, the events also support the kids with a party, and donations from sponsors and the community to make for a day these young ones look forward to all year long.

The race is now run in 50 mile, 26.2 mile, and 13.1 mile formats.
