= Micah True =

American ultrarunner

Personal information
- Nickname: Caballo Blanco
- Nationality: American
- Born: Michael Randall Hickman; November 10, 1953 Oakland, California, U.S.
- Died: March 27, 2012 (aged 58) Gila Wilderness, New Mexico, U.S.

Sport
- Sport: Boxing; Running
- Events: Middleweight boxing; Ultramarathon running

Micah True (November 10, 1953 – March 27, 2012), born Michael Randall Hickman and also known as Caballo Blanco (white horse), was an American ultrarunner from Boulder, Colorado, who received attention because of his depiction as a central character in Christopher McDougall's book Born to Run. True's inclusion in the book garnered him some attention in ultrarunning circles, and some readers credited him as their inspiration for taking up the sport.

During the 1980s and 90s, True spent several months per year trail running in Mexico. In 2003, True decided to organize a race for the Tarahumara people in Mexico that would help them preserve their culture and running heritage. True died on March 27, 2012, during a run in the Gila Wilderness, part of the Gila National Forest in southwestern New Mexico.

== Life ==
Micah True was born Michael Randall Hickman in Oakland, California, the son of a Korean War Marine Corps Gunnery Sergeant and the second of four children. He grew up traveling the country as his family relocated to various nationally located Marine Corps bases. His family was conservative Roman Catholic, but True aligned himself with the counter-culture movement of the 1960s and 70s.

True attended Humboldt State University, where he studied Eastern religions and Native American history. To earn money he began prizefighting in informal boxing bouts, using the name "Gypsy Cowboy," and perhaps taking the occasional dive for an easy payday. Between 1974 and 1982, Hickman was a professional middleweight boxer, fighting under the name Mike "True" Hickman. His career record was 9 wins (KO 2), 11 losses (KO 9), and 0 draws.

At some point True spent 10 months living in a cave in Hawaii where he fell in love with a rich girl. It was when she left him, he said, that he took up long-distance running. He also changed his name from Michael Hickman to Micah True. (The name Micah comes from the Bible, while True came from the name of a beloved pet: True Dog.)

By 1982, True had moved to Boulder, Colorado, where he began working as a self-employed furniture mover. By then he had become a "trailrunning bum" (like a "surfing bum or a climbing bum"). For almost 20 years, he spent winters running in Mexico, Guatemala, and Central America, averaging 170 miles (270 km) per week. He would return to Boulder during the summers to earn enough money to live on the rest of the year. Among villagers he became known as "El Caballo Blanco" or "The White Horse" for his long blond hair and pale skin.

In 1993, True came in contact with the Tarahumara or Rarámuri runners from Chihuahua, Mexico. In 1994, he began spending his winters running in the Copper Canyons, where he built a hut and began establishing a relationship with the Tarahumara natives.

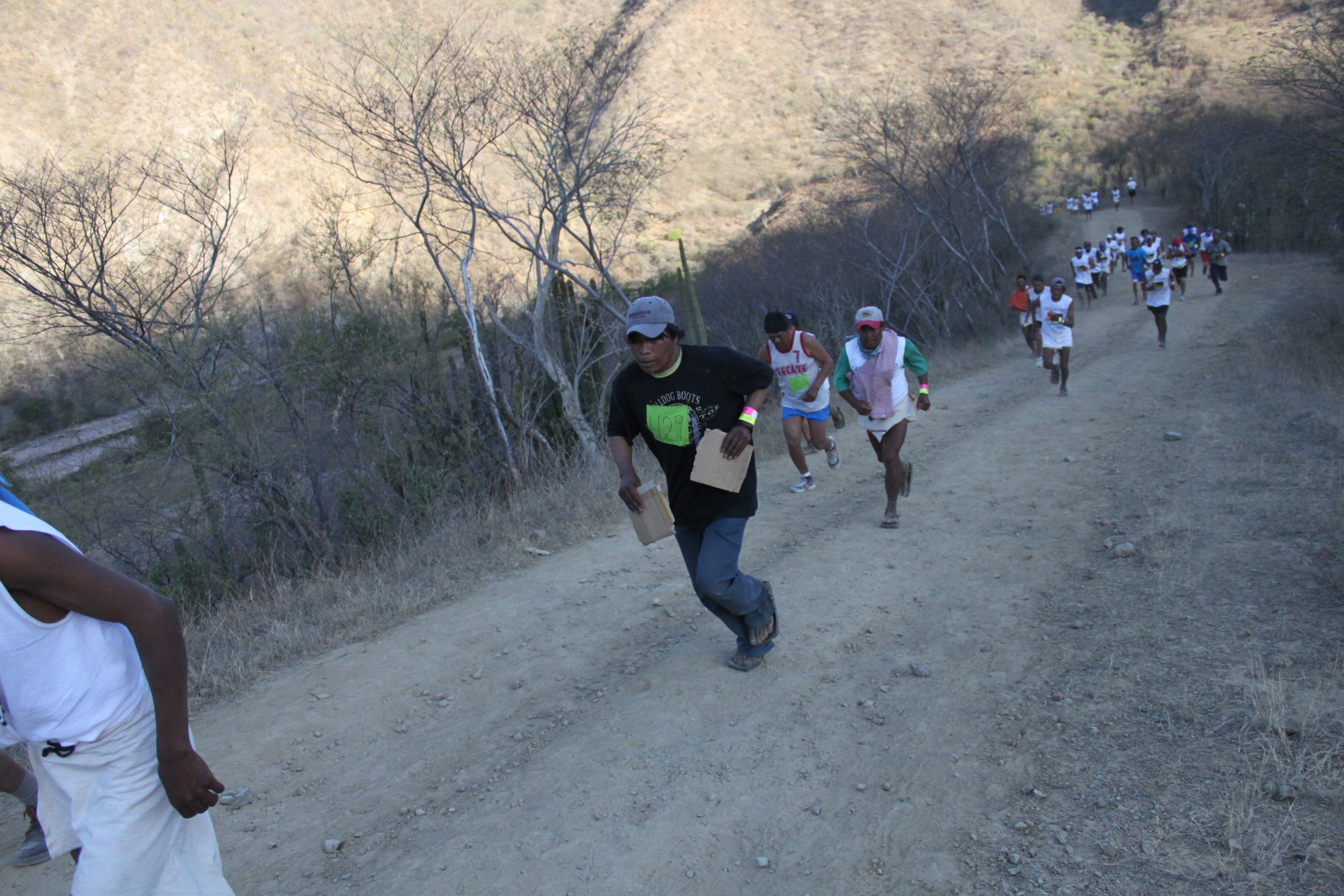
Copper Canyons marathon in Urique

== Copper Canyon Ultra Marathon ==
In 2003, True decided to organize a race for the Tarahumara natives that would help them preserve their culture and running heritage. The first Copper Canyon Ultra Marathon was held on March 23, 2003; though turnout was small, it became an annual tradition.

In 2006, True had the idea of inviting American ultrarunners to compete with the Tarahumara. After initially reaching out on the internet, he wrote an article in Men's Health, elucidating many of the lessons he internalized from the Tarahumara people. He also contacted Christopher McDougall, a writer for Men's Health, who would later write the book Born to Run.

The 2012 event took place on March 12 and was the largest ever with hundreds of participants. Most were local Tarahumara, known for their running endurance, both as a general means of travel and while participating in ceremonial, team-based, long distance running events, most famously the Rarajipari, or ball game. In addition to prize money for the top ten finishers, the event awards seed corn vouchers to all runners who complete the distance. The race has its start and finish in the town square of Urique, Chihuahua, Mexico, covering an estimated 50 miles (80 km) of single track trail and dirt road.

== Born to Run ==
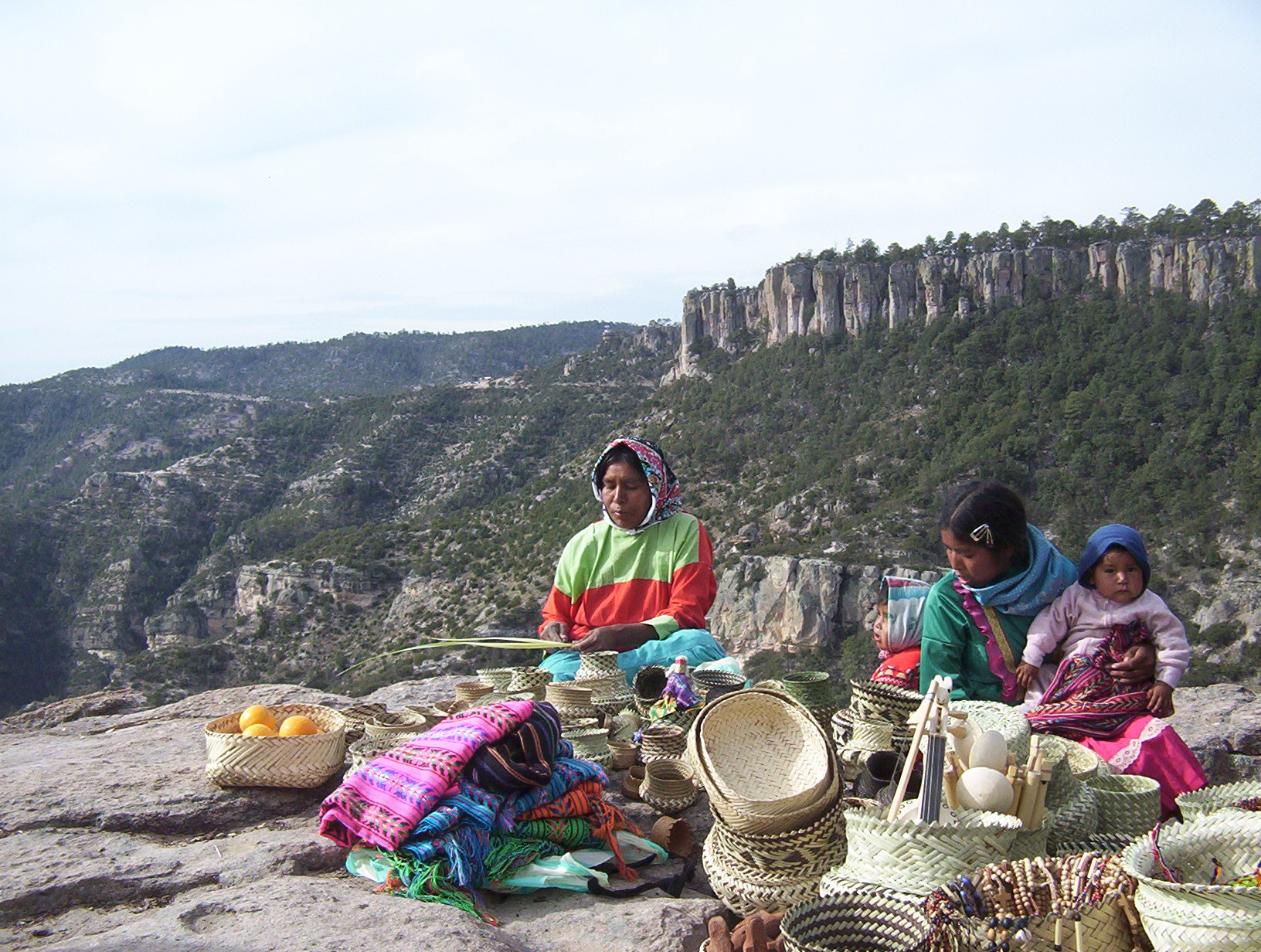
Tarahumara women selling baskets, blankets and oranges

In 2009, True was featured prominently in Christopher McDougall's best selling book Born to Run. (Note: The book was on the New York Times Best Seller List for more than four months, although book critic Dan Zak, writer of the Style section of the Washington Post thought it contained extraneous efforts to be "gonzo and overly clever".) The book told the story of the Copper Canyons ultra marathon and the Tarahumara, while promoting the endurance running hypothesis, arguing that humans left the forests and moved to the savannas by developing the ability to run long distances in order to hunt prey by simply outlasting them in a long chase.

Becoming a central character in a best selling book changed True's life significantly. Previously he had lived a quiet simple life, not seeing himself as the eccentric and amazing person in the book. He said he sometimes felt like he had to "live up to the expectations of the book" and told people that the book contained exaggerations and inaccuracies. Nevertheless, he became active on Facebook where he encouraged people to follow him. It was through Facebook that he met Maria Walton, who became his girlfriend for the last two years of his life.

True also began using his celebrity status to help raise funds for the annual Copper Canyon race. He spoke at various events, beginning with a Saucony sponsored event in Utah, and then eventually traveling to Sweden, Denmark, and England. According to Walton, True was never comfortable with his fame, only wanting to be known as someone who was genuine and real.

== Death and race continuation ==
On March 27, 2012, True failed to return after heading out for a run in the Gila Wilderness, part of the Gila National Forest in southwestern New Mexico. He departed from the Wilderness Lodge in Gila, saying he was going for a 12-mile (19 km) run. A subsequent mountain rescue effort involved three aircraft and at least nine search and rescue teams in off-road vehicles and on horseback, looking across 200,000 acres (81,000 ha) of high desert. Searchers included ultra-runners such as Scott Jurek, Kyle Skaggs, Timothy Olson, and many athletes and friends who had participated in the 51 mile Copper Canyon Ultra Marathon.

On March 31, True was found dead with his legs dangling in a stream. The local sheriff said there were "no obvious signs of trauma", although True had scrapes and abrasions on his hands, arms, and knees, suggesting a fall. His remains were removed by horseback. Because of difficult terrain and remote location, the recovery was not completed until April 1. An autopsy was inconclusive with respect to the actual cause of death, revealing, however, that True was suffering from idiopathic cardiomyopathy, which had caused the left ventricle of his heart to become enlarged. The autopsy report of the Office of the Medical Investigator of New Mexico noted that "the decedent did not have a regular physician and no medical records, particularly electrocardiograms or blood pressure readings were available for review" and "the best determination is that of unclassified cardiomyopathy which resulted in a cardiac dysrhythmia during exertion."

However, Dr. James O'Keefe Jr., the director of Preventative Cardiology Fellowship Program and the Director of Preventative Cardiology at Cardiovascular Consultants at the Saint Luke's Mid America Heart Institute, a large cardiology practice in Kansas City, looked at the pathology report and believes that Micah True's enlarged thickened heart with scar tissue is a pathology some extreme endurance athletes develop termed Phidippides cardiomyopathy by Peter A. McCullough in research conducted with Justin E. Trivax. According to McCullough and Trivax's hypothesis, "this pathology occurs because endurance sports call for a sustained increase in cardiac output for several hours" which puts the heart "into a state of volume overload. It has been shown that approximately one-third of marathon runners experience dilation of the right atrium and ventricle, have elevations of cardiac troponin and natriuretic peptides, and in a smaller fraction later develop small patches of cardiac fibrosis that are the likely substrate for ventricular tachyarrhythmias and sudden death."

A simple memorial gathering was held at Colorado Chautauqua in Boulder on April 6, in which friends ran up Flagstaff Mountain in Colorado and assembled on the Chautauqua park lawn to swap stories and remembrances of him.

Due to True's role in the organization and production of the Copper Canyon Ultramarathon, after his death the continuation of the event was placed in doubt. The charitable organization, Norawas de Raramuri (Friends of the Running People), founded in 2009 by (in alphabetical order) Brooke Cantor, Deborah K. Kelly, Andrew Labbe, and Chris Labbe, continued to fund Rarámuri participation in the race. Between 2009 and 2013, Norawas de Rarámuri (501(c)(3)), raised and distributed approximately $40K per year, exclusively to Rarámuri communities, including exclusively Rarámuri events, other than the Copper Canyon Ultramarathon. Under new direction by Maria Walton, True's partner, and Fuego y Agua Events LLC. Director Josue Stephens, the race event continued for several more years. In honor of Micah, the race has since taken the name by which it has always been known in Mexico, Ultramaraton Caballo Blanco.

== See also ==
- James A. Corea
- Jim Fixx
- Bill Smith (fell runner) — similar incident, remote location, well known runner, difficult body recovery
