= Bathysanthus =

Scientific classification
- Kingdom: Plantae
- Clade: Tracheophytes
- Clade: Angiosperms
- Clade: Eudicots
- Clade: Asterids
- Order: Asterales
- Family: Asteraceae
- Subfamily: Asteroideae
- Tribe: Astereae
- Genus: Bathysanthus; G.L.Nesom
- Species: B. sinforosa

Binomial name
- Bathysanthus sinforosa G.L.Nesom

Genus of flowering plants

Bathysanthus is a genus of flowering plants in the family Asteraceae. It includes a single species, Bathysanthus sinforosa, an herbaceous plant which grows up to 1 meter high.

The plant was described in 2018 from specimens collected from Barranca de Sinforosa in southwestern Chihuahua state, one of six distinct canyons that make up the Copper Canyon (Barrancas del Cobre) system along the western side of the Sierra Tarahumara, which is part of the Sierra Madre Occidental. The plant was collected in upper sandy areas of the floodwash zone at the canyon bottom, between 900 and 1450 meters elevation.
