= Blacklers =

Former department store in Liverpool

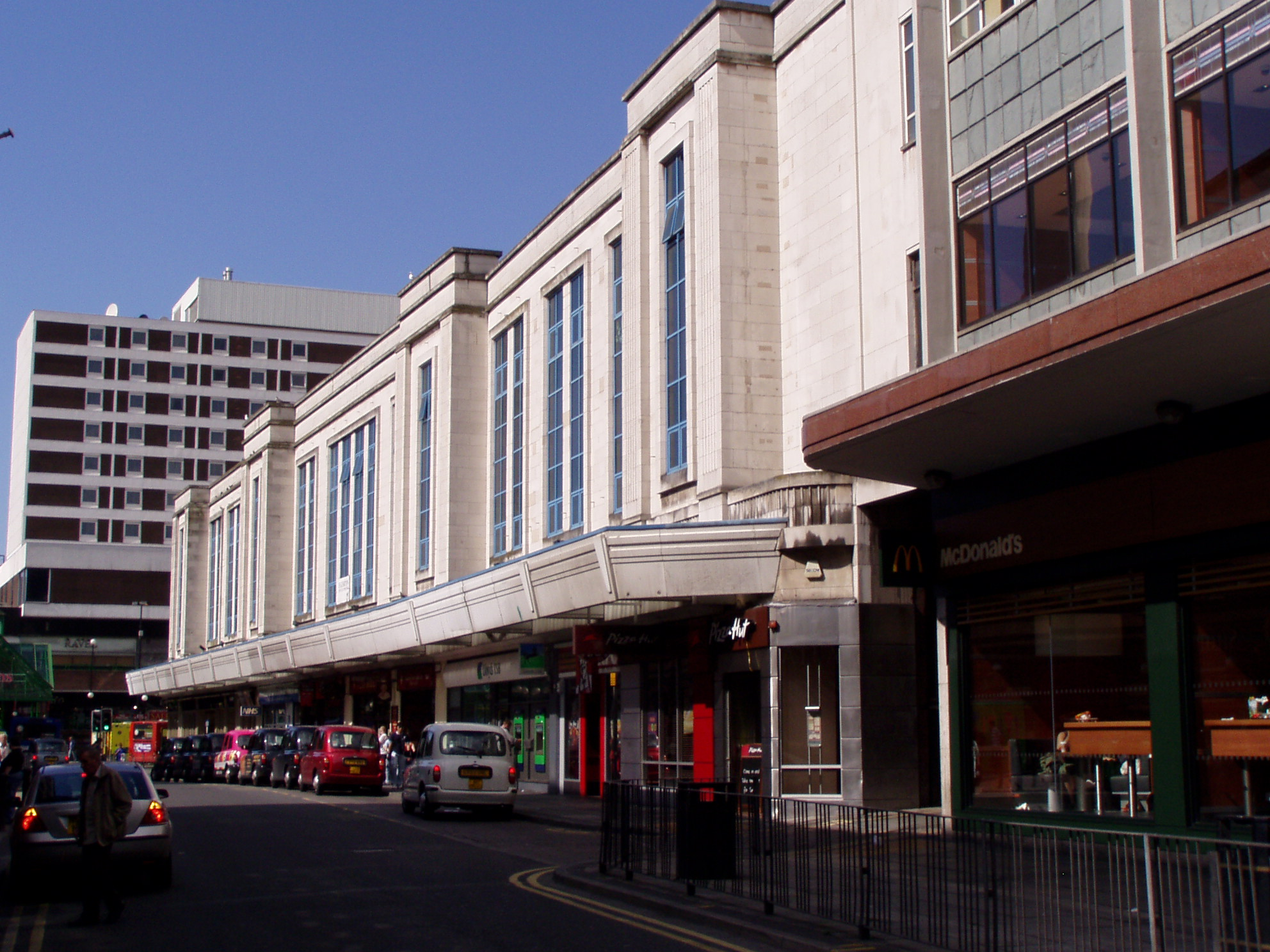
The Blacklers department store building

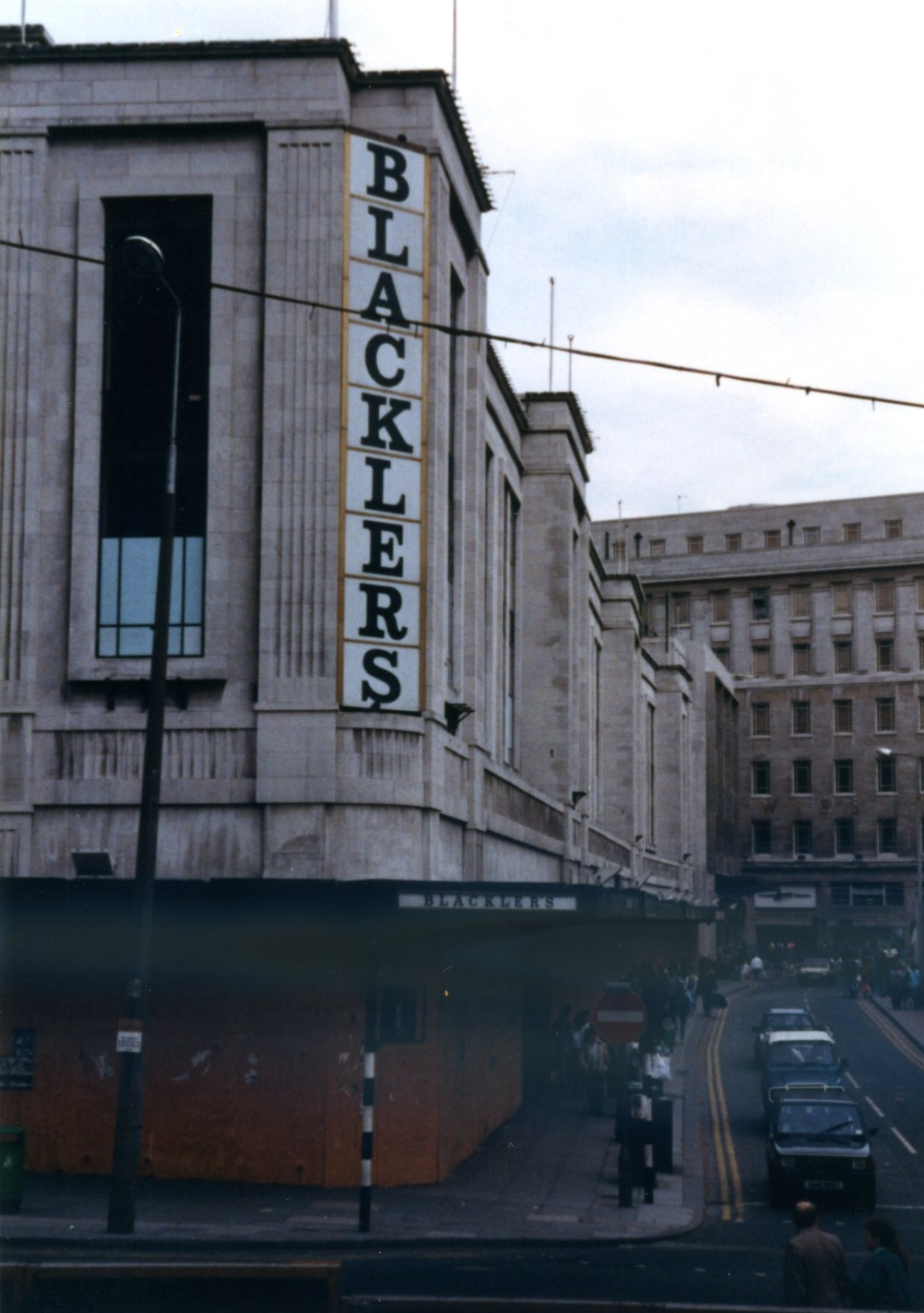
Blacklers as it appeared in August 1988, shortly after its closure. Note that the ground floor is boarded up.

Blacklers was a large department store on the corner of Elliot Street and Great Charlotte Street in Liverpool, England. The store was famous for its lavish Christmas grotto and its rocking horse, Blackie, which is now on display in the Museum of Liverpool. The store, which at its peak employed a thousand people, also has connections to The Beatles: George Harrison worked as an apprentice electrician at Blacklers in 1959, and Pete Best's mother Mona bought his drum kit from the Blacklers music department.

Blacklers was founded by partners Richard John Blackler and A.B. Wallis in the early twentieth century. Blackler died in 1919 and was succeeded as a partner in the business by his wife Margaret.

Despite the building being severely damaged in The Blitz of May 1941 during World War II, the business survived. Temporary outlets were created in Bold Street and Church Street and the first part of the new store opened on 29 March 1953.

Margaret Blackler died in 1957 without children, at which point the store became the property of several individuals, of which the major shareholder was the sportswoman Vera Kingston (Margaret's god-daughter). In 1983 following Vera's death the store was sold on once again, and all links to the original owners disappeared. The store remained open only a few years more, closing in April 1988.

The site now includes a Wetherspoons chain pub, named Richard John Blackler in honour of the store's founder.

== See also ==
- Bill Smith (fell runner)

The shop also boasted a large warehouse on Strand Road Bootle, which serviced the store daily. Deliveries were also dispatched from there for customers throughout the northwest and an art department that built displays throughout the year.
