= Born to Run (McDougall book) =

Book by Christopher McDougall

Born to Run: A Hidden Tribe, Superathletes, and the Greatest Race the World Has Never Seen
- Author: Christopher McDougall
- Genre: Nonfiction
- Publication date: 2009
- ISBN: 978-0-307-26630-9

Born to Run: A Hidden Tribe, Superathletes, and the Greatest Race the World Has Never Seen, is a 2009 best-selling non-fiction book written by the American author and journalist Christopher McDougall. The book has sold over three million copies.

== Narrative ==
In Born to Run, McDougall tracks down members of the reclusive Tarahumara Native Mexican tribe in the Mexican Copper Canyons.

He writes, some claim hyperbolically, that "[i]n Tarahumara land, there was no crime, war, or theft. There was no corruption, obesity, drug addiction, greed, wife-beating, child abuse, heart disease, high blood pressure or carbon emissions. They didn’t get diabetes, or depressed, or even old." This and other statements in the book have been criticized by some authors.

After being repeatedly injured as a runner himself, McDougall marvels at the tribe's ability to run ultra distances (over 100 miles) at incredible speeds, without getting the routine injuries that most American runners had. The book has received attention in the sporting world for McDougall's description of how he overcame injuries by modeling his running after the Tarahumara.

He asserts that modern cushioned running shoes are a major cause of running injury, pointing to the thin sandals worn by Tarahumara runners, and the explosion of running-related injuries since the introduction of modern running shoes in 1972. Although he reports that the Berne Grand Prix questionnaire supports that opinion, the study authors clearly say — "Occurrence of jogging injuries was independently associated with higher weekly mileage (P < 0.001), history of previous running injuries (P < 0.001), and competitive training motivation (P = 0.03)." However they did find some correlation between higher shoe prices and increased injuries, but explicitly warn — "It is probably incorrect, however, to interpret this surprising finding to mean that more expensive shoes cause more running injuries…"

Alongside his research into the Tarahumara, McDougall delves into why the human species, unique among primates, has developed traits for endurance running. He promotes the endurance running hypothesis, arguing that humans left the forests and moved to the savannas by developing the ability to run long distances in order to literally run down prey.

The book was on The New York Times Best Seller list for over four months. The book was criticized by Dan Zak of The Washington Post for what he believed was an extraneous effort: "McDougall's prose, while at times straining to be gonzo and overly clever, is engaging and buddy-buddy, as if he's an enthusiastic friend tripping over himself to tell a great story."

== Film adaptation ==
A film adaptation of this Native American drama was under development by LD Entertainment and producers Lorenzo di Bonaventura and Deb Newmyer. In 2015 it was reported that Matthew McConaughey would be starring and that Matthew Michael Carnahan would write the screenplay. The film has not gone into production.

== See also ==
- Micah True, an ultrarunner who appears in the book under his nickname, "Caballo Blanco"
- Scott Jurek
- Jenn Shelton
- Ann Trason
- Persistence hunting
