= Cursorial =

Organism adapted specifically to run

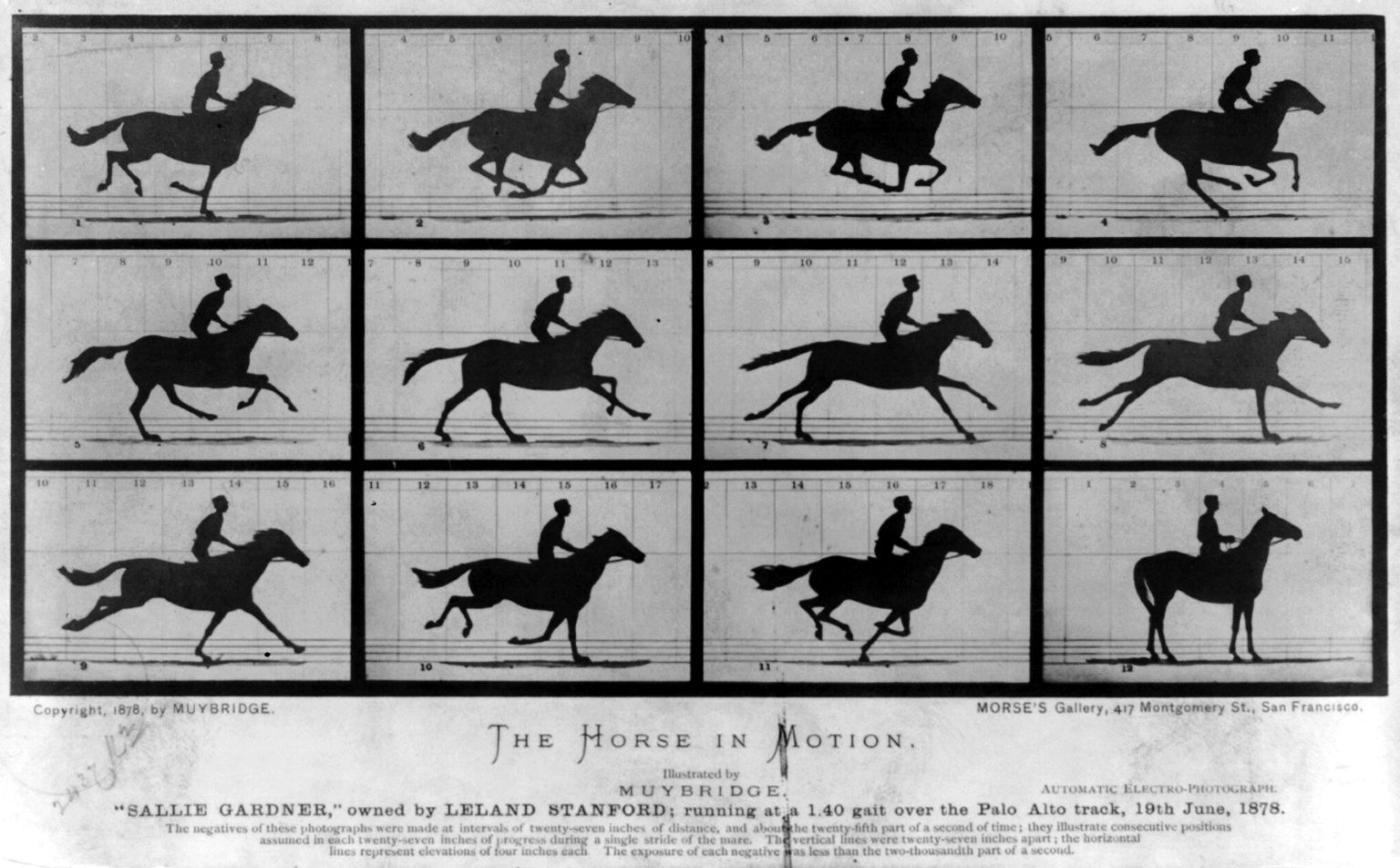
Horses can be considered cursorial grazers.

A cursorial organism is one that is adapted specifically to run. An animal can be considered cursorial if it has the ability to run fast (e.g. cheetah) or if it can keep a constant speed for a long distance (high endurance). "Cursorial" is often used to categorize a certain locomotor mode, which is helpful for biologists who examine behaviors of different animals and the way they move in their environment. Cursorial adaptations can be identified by morphological characteristics (e.g. loss of lateral digits as in ungulate species), physiological characteristics, maximum speed, and how often running is used in life. Much debate exists over how to define a cursorial animal specifically. The most accepted definitions include that a cursorial organism could be considered adapted to long-distance running at high speeds or has the ability to accelerate quickly over short distances. Among vertebrates, animals under 1 kg of mass are rarely considered cursorial, and cursorial behaviors and morphology are thought to only occur at relatively large body masses in mammals. A few mammals have been termed "micro-cursors" that are less than 1 kg in mass and have the ability to run faster than other small animals of similar sizes.

Some species of spiders are also considered cursorial, as they walk much of the day, looking for prey.

== Cursorial adaptations ==
=== Terrestrial vertebrates ===
Adaptations for cursorial locomotion in terrestrial vertebrates include:

- Increased stride length by:
  - Increased limb bone length
  - Adoption of digitigrade or unguligrade stance
  - Loss of clavicle in mammals, which allows the scapula to move forwards and backwards with the limb and thereby increase stride length.
  - Increased spinal flexion during galloping
- Decreased distal limb weight (in order to minimize moment of inertia):
  - Increase in mass of proximal muscles with decrease in mass of distal muscles
  - Increase in length of distal limb bones (the manus and pes) rather than proximal ones (the brachium or thigh).
  - Longer tendons in distal limb
- Decreased ability to move limbs outside of the sagittal plane, which increases stability.
- Reduction or loss of digits.
- Loss of ability to pronate and supinate the forearm (more specialized cursors)
- Hooves, hoof-like claws, or blunt claws for traction (as opposed to sharp claws for prey-capture or climbing)

Typically, cursors will have long, slender limbs, produced mostly by elongating distal limb elements (metatarsals/metacarpals), along with loss or reduction of lateral digits, and digitigrade or unguligrade foot posture. These characteristics are understood to decrease weight in the distal portions of the limb, which allows the limb to swing faster (by minimizing its moment of inertia). Concentration of muscles at the pectoral and pelvic girdles, with progressively less muscle and more tendons farther along the limb, is typical of quadrupedal cursors (e.g. cheetah, greyhound, horse). There are non-cursorial mammals with very similar distribution of hindlimb muscles, as the blesmols (fossorial mammals) and even humans; this indicates that this cursorial anatomical adaptation is not a rule for hindlimbs. All ungulates are considered cursorial based on these criteria, but in fact there are some ungulates that do not habitually run. Elongation of the limbs does increase stride length, which has been suggested to be more correlated with larger home ranges and foraging patterns in ungulates. Stride length can also be lengthened by the mobility of the shoulder girdle. Some cursorial mammals have a reduced or absent clavicle, which allows the scapula to slide forward across the ribcage.

Cursorial animals tend to have increased elastic storage in their epaxial muscles, which allows them to store elastic energy while the spine flexes and extends in the dorso-ventral plane. Furthermore, limbs in cursorially adapted mammals will tend to stay in the dorso-ventral (or sagittal) plane to increase stability when moving forward at high speeds, but this hinders the amount of lateral flexibility that limbs can have. Some felids are special in that they can pronate and supinate their forearms and run fast, but this is not the case in most other quadrupedal cursors. Ungulates and canids have restricted motion in their limbs and therefore could be considered more specialized for cursorial locomotion. Several rodents are also considered cursorial (e.g. the mara, capybara, and agouti) and have similar characters to other cursorial mammals such as reduced digits, more muscles in the proximal portion than distal portion of the limb, and straight, sagittally oriented limbs. Some rodents are bipedal and can hop quickly to move around, which is called ricochetal or saltatorial instead of cursorial.

There are also bipedal cursors. Humans are bipedal and considered to be built for endurance running. Several species of birds are also cursorial, mainly those that have attained larger body sizes (ostrich, greater rhea, emu). Most of the stride length in birds comes from movements below the knee joint, because the femur is situated horizontally and the knee joint sits more towards the front of the body, placing the feet below the center of mass. Different birds will increase their speed in one of two ways: by increasing the frequency of footfalls or increasing the stride length. Several studies have also found that many theropod dinosaurs (specifically coelurosaurs) were also cursorial to an extent.

=== Spiders ===
Spiders maintain balance when walking, so that legs 1 and 3 on one side and 2 and 4 on the other side are moving, while the other four legs are on the surface. To run faster, spiders increase their stride frequency.

== Cursorial taxa ==
Several notable taxa are cursorial, including some mammals (such as wolverines and wolves, ungulates, agoutis, and kangaroos), as well as some dinosaurs (such as theropods, including birds like the ostrich). Several extinct archosaurs were also cursorial, including the crocodylomorphs Pristichampsus, Hesperosuchus, and several genera within Notosuchia.

Jumping spiders and other non-web based spiders generally walk throughout the day, so that they maximize their chances of a catch, and web-based spiders run away if threatened.

Many Blattodea have very sensitive cursorial legs, that can be so specialized they run away at the puff of wind, such as the American cockroach.

== In evolutionary theory ==
The presumed cursorial nature of theropod dinosaurs is an important part of the ground-up theory of the evolution of bird flight (also called the cursorial theory). It contrasts with the idea that the pre-flight ancestors of birds were arboreal species and proposes that the flight apparatus may have been adapted to improve hunting by lengthening leaps and improving maneuverability.

== See also ==
- Arboreal
- Fossorial
- Cursorial hunting
