= Erwan Le Corre =

Founder of MovNat physical education system

- Born: 10 September 1971 (age 54); France
- Known for: Founder of MovNat

Erwan Le Corre, a French American born on September 10, 1971, is the founder and innovator of a physical education system and lifestyle known as MovNat, which derives from the French words "mouvement naturel" ("natural movement").

== Early life and training ==
Erwan Le Corre grew up in the French village of Étréchy, and later at Épinay-sur-Orge, both south of Paris. As a child he spent his free time outdoors exploring and playing in the fields and woods around his village. At age 18, Le Corre received a black belt in Karate. Starting at age 19 he did parkour-like training for 7 years with the Parisian stuntman Don Jean Habrey. Habrey called his discipline "Combat Vital." During this period he also began barefoot running. At age 27, he began a period of training which included sailing, Olympic weightlifting, rock climbing, long distance triathlon, trail running and Brazilian jiu-jitsu.

== Development of a system of natural movement ==
In 2004 Erwan Le Corre started researching the physical training method of the French naval officer Georges Hébert. The training developed by Hébert is known as "la méthode naturelle" ("natural method"). In 2008 Le Corre formally began his physical education system and lifestyle known as MovNat and began teaching it in weekend workshops and weeklong outdoor retreats.

== MovNat ==
According to Le Corre, MovNat is "a school of physical competency entirely based on natural movement, which includes the locomotive skills of walking, running, balancing, crawling, jumping, climbing and swimming, the manipulative skills of lifting, carrying, throwing and catching, and the defensive skills of striking and grappling, and that the most important principles of natural movement are practicality and adaptability."

Regarding the difference between Hébert's "méthode naturelle" and Le Corre's MovNat, Le Corre has said that "the main difference resides in the coaching system, which has been updated. It is more elaborate and efficient in MovNat.... MovNat's philosophy is formulated to better fit with today using modern forms of communication, for instance video and the Internet."

== Static apnea training ==
Starting in the year 2020, Le Corre began training in the discipline of prolonged breath-holding, known as static apnea. The practical use for prolonged breath-holding is for freediving. In 2021, Le Corre performed a breath-hold for 6 minutes, 46 seconds, while he was face-down in a pool. His breath-hold was verified by the United States Freediving Federation, who listed the duration of Le Corre's static apnea breath-hold as being a new United States national record for the under 50 age group. In January 2023 Le Corre set another United States national record in the 50+ age category with a breath-hold duration of 7 minutes and 8 seconds.

== Personal life ==
Erwan Le Corre became a United States citizen via naturalization based on his accomplishments in creating a nationwide training program and working towards what ultimately became his book The Practice of Natural Movement. He has three children. Le Corre was based near Santa Fe, New Mexico during the 2010s.

== Publications ==
In 2019 Erwan Le Corre released his first book entitled The Practice of Natural Movement: Reclaim Power, Health and Freedom. Le Corre's book has also been translated into German and Polish.

== See also ==
- Functional training
- Barefoot running
- Fitness trail
- Green exercise
- Street workout
- History of physical training and fitness

== Sources ==
- Angel, Julie (2016). Breaking the Jump: The Secret Story of Parkour's High Flying Rebellion, Arum Press.
- Durant, John (2013). The Paleo Manifesto: Ancient Wisdom for Lifelong Health, Harmony Books (Random House).
- McDougall, Christopher (2015). Natural Born Heroes: How A Daring Band of Misfits Mastered the Lost Secrets of Strength and Endurance, Vintage.
