= Bill Smith (fell runner) =

English fell runner and author (1936–2011)

Personal information
- Nationality: English
- Born: William R. Smith; 7 May 1936
- Died: c. September 2011 (aged 74–75) Forest of Bowland, Lancashire, England

Sport
- Sport: Running
- Event: Fell running

William R. "Bill" Smith (7 May 1936 – September 2011) was a fell runner and author on the sport. His achievements in breaking records for the number of peaks scaled within 24 hours, contributions to fell-running events, plus documenting its history, earned him the accolade of "legend" within the sport upon his accidental death in 2011. (Note: "The word legend is all too often rolled out in sporting circles. A footballer who scores a few goals, a cricketer who enjoys a few good days, they sometimes earn the tag as memories of their greatness often exceed their actual achievements. Few legends are actually responsible for a genuine shift in their sport, few legends become synonymous with their sport. Bill Smith was, without any question, a legend in the world of fell running. In the wake of his dreadfully sad death, lavish tributes have been paid to a man who changed the perception of his sport." Donlan, Matt (8 October 2011). "Legend is the only word for Bill". Lancashire Telegraph.) His body was discovered on 7 October in a peat bog in the Forest of Bowland, Lancashire, England, after a three-week disappearance.

== Career ==
Born on 7 May 1936, and a lifelong resident of Liverpool who left school at age 15, Bill Smith earned his livelihood by working as a porter at a Liverpool department store for most of his adult life. (Note: The Guardian named his employer as Lewis's and The Economist says it was Blacklers department store. (See Wright, Selwyn (12 October 2011). "Bill Smith obituary". The Guardian. UK. and "Bill Smith, a legend among fell-runners, was found dead on the Lancashire moors on October 1st, aged 75 (Obituary)". The Economist. 22 October 2011..)) Smith took up fell running in 1971 and quickly became one of the sport's best-known competitors. Peter Booth, chairman of Clayton-le-Moors Harriers, said that Smith "did so much for fell running ... and will be greatly missed by all."

In 1969, 1970 and 1971 he put in respectable performances in the Fellsman Hike, a race that is said to be the "ultimate fell running challenge." Second place finishes were attained in 1973, 1976 and 1977 and he "quickly became a member of the prizewinning team" at the Clayton Harriers. The 1970s saw him train 80 to 100 miles (130 to 160 km) per week.

In 1973, Smith became the twelfth person to complete the Bob Graham Round, considered "one of the most demanding challenges in the country", and breaking its record (with Boyd Millen) by scaling 42 Lake District peaks in under 24 hours. He built on the feat by traversing 55 peaks in 24 hours, and in 1975, 63 peaks in 23 hours and 55 minutes. The latter established a new benchmark in fell running, second only to the record of 72 peaks set by Joss Naylor. (Note: Naylor and Smith were setting records in roughly the same era, at what some might consider to be an advanced age, and both were born in 1936.) (Note: Erroneously reported as 65 peaks at Traynor, Luke (7 October 2011). "Tributes to legendary Everton fell runner Bill Smith, found trapped in Lancashire peat bog". Liverpool Echo.) His conquest of Marilyns, tors and other peaks was renowned. He successfully competed in long distance fell races, e.g., the Lake District Mountain Trial and the Wasdale "Horseshoe" Fell Race.

Smith lived alone in Everton, and was said to enjoy "Cajun ... [and] gypsy music." He eschewed telephones and cars, often walked rather than rode, and was a devotee of public transportation. He constantly acted as a mentor at events, took photographs that he would share for free, and when not running, he acted as a marshal.

In July 2011, Bill Smith was part of a relay that carried Fred Rogerson's ashes "around their beloved Bob Graham Round ..." (Note: Despite 40 years of supporting the event with his "heart and soul", Rogerson never completed the Bob Graham round himself. However, as a tribute and memorial his ashes were borne by his associates "in a pocket watch case presented by Bob Graham to his pacer Phil Davison in 1927." "Fred's Round" (PDF). Fell Runners Association. Archived from the original (PDF) on 25 July 2011. "Fell runners honour Windermere Bob Graham stalwart". Westmoreland Gazette. 29 July 2011. Archived from the original on 2 April 2012.) Rogerson, Stan Bradshaw and Bill Smith, were a trio that "formed part of the bedrock of modern-day fell running." All three died within the span of 18 months.

In August 2011 he was named as "Honorary of Clayton-le-Moors Harriers", to recognise his service to the club and sport. (Note: See Road Runners Club.) From 1972 he was member No. 172.

== Death ==
On 10 September 2011, Smith travelled from Ormskirk to Preston by rail, but never made the return trip. On 25 September, race onlookers and participants became concerned when Smith did not appear at the rendezvous point for the Thieveley Pike race near Burnley, where he was expected to serve as a marshal.

His body was discovered by a walker in a remote location outside the range of mobile phone signals and from which "it took several hours of hiking ... [to] raise the alarm." The remains were recovered by the Bowland Pennine Mountain Rescue Team in a five-hour extraction that required a helicopter. (Note: See Mountain rescue in England and Wales.) There was a return ticket in Smith's pocket. (Note: The Economist opines that it was a train ticket, and that he was taking an indirect route to the beginning of a race. The Guardian said it was a "bus" ticket.)

As The Independent article commented: "The rescuers paused for a few moments to pay their respects to the man they found submerged in a peat bog on the remote Trough of Bowland last weekend. It is an honour afforded all those that perish out on the wild Lancashire fell sides." However, the recovery party was largely clueless that the "elderly man, discovered the previous day but thought to have lain undiscovered for up to three weeks, belonged to one of the legends" of British sport. He is thought to have "fallen as he ran across Saddle Fell."

Peat bogs are "a potent menace to all runners and walkers." Although said to be among the most tender and threatened British habitats, in the northern uplands they are a common landscape feature. A deceptive appearance of solid ground can mask "little more than a veneer of soil floating on often ice-cold water." According to survival experts, anyone who falls into a peat bog should move slowly and swim broadly in an effort to reach safety. As with being stuck in quick sand, panic and errant movements can exacerbate a bad situation and make "it impossible to escape without help."

Filing a 'flight plan,' having a buddy system, and carrying proper equipment could be possible preventatives of similar tragedies. "[M]ountain rescuers said the tragedy showed that even seasoned runners needed to let someone know their plans", know where they are and have a mobile phone, and to make sure they carry a full complement of equipment. (Note: This was the second tragedy for the Clayton Harriers. In April 1994, an uncharacteristic and strong blizzard killed Judith Taylor at the Kentmere Fell Race. Bell, Alex (7 October 2011). "Fell running legend is found dead in peat bog". Moorland: Accrington Observer. Archived from the original on 17 December 2011. See also, Brown, Doug (8 January 2007). "Memoirs of a Fell Runner". Wesham Road Runners. Archived from the original on 7 April 2012.) (Note: In some fell running events, e.g., mountain marathons, a buddy system is sometimes used, and there are teams of two. Required equipment can be extensive and finely detailed. See, e.g. Original Mountain Marathon) Believing when he made the statement that a "walker" was involved, Phil O'Brien of the Rescue Team stated "I urge walkers not to take any unnecessary risks and where possible, to use appropriate maps." "They should tell someone where they are going and when to expect them back. They should make sure they are wearing appropriate clothing and footwear and to check the weather forecast before setting off. Inexperienced walkers should make sure they are with someone with them who knows the area well."

Blurred eyesight was suspected to be a factor in his final fall; he skipped several scheduled procedures to deal with the ongoing problem. He found his prescription eyeglasses to be ineffective. He refused to wear glasses whilst running, and considered them to be a needless nuisance. Nevertheless, he was troubled seeing persons with whom he conversed; but was said to be "fearless" as he careened madly (and perhaps blindly) down mountains. Thus, he may have misjudged distances and fallen into the bog. In any event, "Friends ... said Mr Smith's failing eyesight could have been the cause of his tragic accident", but whether blindness "was the problem, or ... his heart gave out, nobody knew."

Commonwealth gold medal-winning long distance runner Ron Hill said Smith's death "will be felt by many ... He was relatively young at 75 and tremendously fit and his death is a real shock to everyone. His loss is huge – but I suppose you can say that he passed away while doing what he loved doing, running across the moors."

His funeral took place on 14 October 2011, at the Church of the Good Shepherd in West Derby, Liverpool. Reverend Sandra Trapnell officiated, noting his "great" contribution to the sport, and the many tributes that had appeared. A future memorial event by fell running organisations is anticipated. Donations were made to Mountain Rescue in his memory.

== Book ==
For over a quarter century Smith published a "stream of immaculately researched historical articles" in Fellrunner magazine (which he helped popularise) and other publications.

Smith's treatise, Stud Marks on the Summits started out as a fifty-page flyer, and was thereafter expanded into an "1800 page opus." In print it is 581 pages. The book was privately published after the publishing houses all turned it down; and possession is now a mark of being a fell runner aficionado. It sold out in 1986, and is available electronically on line from the Fell Runners Association (Note: The hardback copy being deemed too valuable to loan out. The Association says: "Fortunately, Bill has granted us permission to hold an electronic copy of the work on the website ...". "FRA Library". Fell Runners Association.) It has been called "the definitive guide" on the sport. Out of print, its internet price exceeded £100 several times. Commonwealth Games gold medal winner and long distance runner Ron Hill (Note: In 1970, Hill won the 74th Boston Marathon in a course record 2:10:30. He also won gold medals for the marathon at the European Championships in 1969 and the Commonwealth Games in 1970. Hill held numerous national and world long distance running records.) described the book as a "bible for future generations."

Despite its epic saga of fell running, Smith is mentioned only six times in the tome. Smith was held in high regard both for his running and for his encyclopaedic knowledge of the sport. (Note: Sources in The Economist characterized him "a walking encyclopedia of amateur fell-running. He knew all the history, the records, the meetings, and had set them down with exacting care in a book ...")

The president of the Fell Runners Association, Graham Breeze, published a posthumous encomium and long-belated book review: "Considering the masterpiece that bears his name Bill Smith was a staggeringly modest and unassuming man ... I am privileged to have known him slightly and corresponded with him occasionally ... A few years ago I wrote a short piece about Stud marks on the summits and sent it to Bill for his approval. I wrote that I knew he would hate it but I would like it to appear in The Fellrunner in homage to his masterpiece. As I partly anticipated, he wrote back and asked me not to publish because it would embarrass him. We later talked about the piece at a race and I promised that, since all writers hate to waste material, it would only appear when he could no longer be embarrassed ... Fellrunners come and go, Champions come and go, but no-one will ever be as important to the development and history of fellrunning as the man who died in September on the Bowland fells."

== Song ==
Boff Whalley, lead guitarist of Chumbawamba, recorded a song inspired by a chance meeting with Smith. Whalley took up fell running as a result. He was paraphrased as having said Smith "encapsulated the ethos of the sport – its emphasis on self-reliance and nature and its history."

== Published works ==
- Smith, Bill. "Bill Smith's articles". Annual Grasmere Sports and Show. Archived from the original on 2 September 2010.
  - "The Conchie Brothers". Annual Grasmere Sports and Show. Archived from the original on 10 June 2011.
  - "Junior Fell Running". Annual Grasmere Sports and Show. Archived from the original on 10 June 2011.
  - "Track, Fell and Coal Carrying — John Morgan". Annual Grasmere Sports and Show. Archived from the original on 10 June 2011.
  - "Rob Jebb and Sharon Taylor — Lakeland Runners in Yorkshire Vests". Annual Grasmere Sports and Show. Archived from the original on 27 August 2009.
  - "The Sports Master from Skipton: A Profile of Roger Ingham MBE". Annual Grasmere Sports and Show. Archived from the original on 28 August 2009.
  - "Sharon Taylor: Descent Specialist". Annual Grasmere Sports and Show. Archived from the original on 15 June 2011.
- Smith, Bill (9 May 2010). "Stanley Bradshaw obituary". The Guardian. UK.
- W.R. Smith, "Runners on the Three Peaks", The Dalesman, 37 (1975–76):966-68.
- Smith, Bill (1985). Stud Marks on the Summit: A History of Amateur Fell Racing: 1861–1983. Preston: SKG Publications. Archived from the original on 12 June 2017. - Total pages: 581
  - Smith, Bill. Errata: Stud Marks on the Summit. Archived from the original on 23 January 2013.

== See also ==
- British orienteers
- James A. Corea
- Jim Fixx
- List of orienteers
- List of orienteering events
- Micah True
- Munro/ "Munro Bagging"

== Other sources ==
- "Bill Smith (1936–2011) photograph tribute". BOFRA. Archived from the original on 10 September 2011.
