= Jenn Shelton =

American ultramarathon runner

Jenn Shelton (born 1983) is an American ultramarathoner. She has set course records in several of the most demanding American ultramarathons.

Shelton attended the University of North Carolina where she played on the rugby team. She dropped out to focus on writing poetry, but later enrolled at Old Dominion University.

Shortly after Shelton began running ultramarathons she won several races and soon became one of the top female ultrarunners in the United States. She often runs in lightweight minimalist running shoes.

In 2006, she traveled with Scott Jurek, Christopher McDougall, and several other ultrarunners as the sole female runner to Copper Canyon in the remote southwestern part of the state of Chihuahua in Mexico to run with the Tarahumara, for McDougall's book Born to Run. While running through a remote area during the trip she became separated from the group and was found severely dehydrated several hours later by a search crew. She has criticized the book's accounts of the Tarahumara people for "romanticizing" their lifestyle and for not adequately describing their poverty.

In May 2007 she gained publicity by being the first woman finisher at the Frederick Marathon, in a women's course record of 2 hours 53 minutes 44 seconds, racing in a bikini rather than conventional running kit.

In July 2010 Shelton won the Deseret News Marathon in a time of 2:54:23. She says that she finds marathons more challenging to run than ultramarathons. Shelton has said that she intends to run more marathons and shorter races, citing a desire to run faster races. She is sponsored by Patagonia and competed in the 2012 U.S. Olympic Marathon Trials, but suffered a hamstring injury and did not finish.

== Bibliography ==
- McDougall, Christopher (2009), Born to Run: A Hidden Tribe, Superathletes, and the Greatest Race the World Has Never Seen, New York: Knopf, pp. 304, ISBN 978-0-307-26630-9
