= Eat & Run =

2012 book by Scott Jurek

- First edition
- Author: Scott Jurek
- ISBN: 978-0-547-56965-9

Eat & Run: My Unlikely Journey to Ultramarathon Greatness is a 2012 autobiography by ultramarathon runner Scott Jurek and Steve Friedman. It was published by Houghton Mifflin Harcourt on June 5, 2012.

The book was a New York Times best seller, debuting at #7 in hardback non-fiction and remained in the bestseller lists into the next month. It has been translated into twenty different languages.

It relates Jurek's childhood in Minnesota, his growing interest in sport, family life and career. It also covers his change in eating habits, from a standard meat-eating diet through to vegetarianism and finally becoming a vegan. Each chapter ends with one of his favorite vegan recipes.
