= Christopher McDougall =

American journalist and author

- Born: 1962 (age 63–64)
- Occupation: Non-fiction author

Christopher McDougall (born 1962) is an American author and journalist. He is best known for his 2009 book Born to Run: A Hidden Tribe, Superathletes, and the Greatest Race the World Has Never Seen.

== Biography ==
McDougall has written for Esquire, The New York Times Magazine, Outside, Men's Journal and New York, and was a contributing editor for Men's Health.

== Born to Run ==
In Born to Run (2009), McDougall follows Caballo Blanco, an American who ran with the Tarahumara Indian tribe in Mexico's Copper Canyons. After being repeatedly injured as a runner himself, McDougall marvels at the tribe's ability to run ultra distances (over 100 miles) at incredible speeds, without getting the routine injuries of most American runners. The book has received attention in the sporting world for McDougall's description of how he overcame injuries by modeling his running after the Tarahumara. He asserts that modern cushioned running shoes are a major cause of running injury, pointing to the thin sandals called huaraches worn by Tarahumara runners, and the explosion of running-related injuries since the introduction of modern running shoes in 1972. It is credited with popularizing barefoot running. He gave a TED talk, "Are we born to run?"

== Natural Born Heroes ==
In Natural Born Heroes (2015), McDougall explores various aspects of heroes and physical fitness, covering the abduction of a Nazi general during World War II, parkour, and various other challenging situations.

== Running With Sherman ==
Running With Sherman (2020) details McDougall's life in the Amish country of Pennsylvania and his relation with animals. "Sherman" is a donkey; the book is about training for a burro race in Colorado.

== Personal life ==
McDougall resides in Peach Bottom, Pennsylvania, a town in Fulton Township.

== Works ==
- Girl Trouble: The True Saga of Superstar Gloria Trevi and the Secret Teenage Sex Cult That Stunned the World (2004)
- Born to Run: A Hidden Tribe, Superathletes, and the Greatest Race the World Has Never Seen (2009)
- Natural Born Heroes: How a Daring Band of Misfits Mastered the Lost Secrets of Strength and Endurance (2015)
- Running with Sherman: The Donkey with the Heart of a Hero (2019). ISBN 9781524732363.

== See also ==
- Micah True, an ultrarunner who appears in Born to Run under his nickname "Caballo Blanco"
- Jenn Shelton
- Curtis Imrie, pack burro racer described in Born to Run
- Scott Jurek, ultraunner featured in Born to Run
- Erwan Le Corre, a natural movement instructor featured in Natural Born Heroes
- Persistence hunting
