= Phidippides cardiomyopathy =

Phidippides cardiomyopathy refers to the cardiomyopathic changes that occur after long periods of endurance training. This term was coined by Justin E. Trivax and his colleague Peter A. McCullough in 2012 following Trivax's research of marathon runners.

In 490 BC, during the Greco-Persian War, Persian King Darius I launched an attack on the outnumbered Greeks, prompting the legendary Greek herald, Pheidippides to run nearly 150 miles from Athens to Sparta for military support. Although the Spartans agreed to help, they could not leave immediately due to religious obligations, and Pheidippides returned to Athens. He then fought at the Battle of Marathon where he learned that the Greeks had defeated the Persians. After running another 26.2 miles to Athens to announce the victory, he collapsed and died after exclaiming, "We are victorious!" This was the first alleged account of long-distance running resulting in mortality, although its historicity is doubted.

It has been proposed by Trivax et al. that strenuous exercise results in a cascade of events starting with the effects of training for long-distance events which may result in left ventricular dilation, left ventricular hypertrophy, and increased left ventricular mass. The acute effects of exercise including increased catecholamines, increased oxygen demand, increased preload and afterload, metabolic derangements, acute kidney injury, dehydration, elevation of troponin, CK, CK-MB, and natriuretic peptides. This results in right atrial and right ventricular strain and dilation, right ventricular hypokinesis and marked diastolic dysfunction. Subacute effects of exercise include increased expression of cardiac fibrotic markers including TGF, fibronectin-1, collagens, MMP-2 and TIMP1. Chronic effects include increased cardiac chamber sizes, patchy areas of fibrosis, atrial and ventricular arrhythmias and increased risk of sudden cardiac death.

This has been quoted in the literature multiple times and has been inaccurately thought that James O'Keefe had coined the term. He was speaking about the sudden death of Micah True, a 58-year-old ultrarunner and cult hero a.k.a. Caballo Blanco who died on a 12-mile training jog in the rugged Gila Wilderness of southwest New Mexico. After an autopsy, the Albuquerque coroner wrote that “Micah True died as a result of cardiomyopathy during exertion”. Since then, multiple websites have warned their readers on the possible damage from prolonged endurance training.

The suggested etiology for Phidippides cardiomyopathy is the cardiac remodeling from prolonged strenuous exercises.

The repeated prolonged states of volume overload in the right atrium and right ventricle from endurance training will lead to chronic structural changes. Long term changes include patches of cardiac fibrosis which can allow zones of re-entry for cardiac arrhythmias.

It is suggested that cardiac MRI is the best imaging modality to investigate this condition.

== Controversy ==
There is not much evidence describing this condition and other than a case report, no other studies have corroborated the pathophysiological changes suggested by McCullough.

Not all experts agree with Trivax and McCullough. Many feel that further research is necessary to understand this condition better.
