= Scott Jurek =

American ultramarathoner (born 1973)

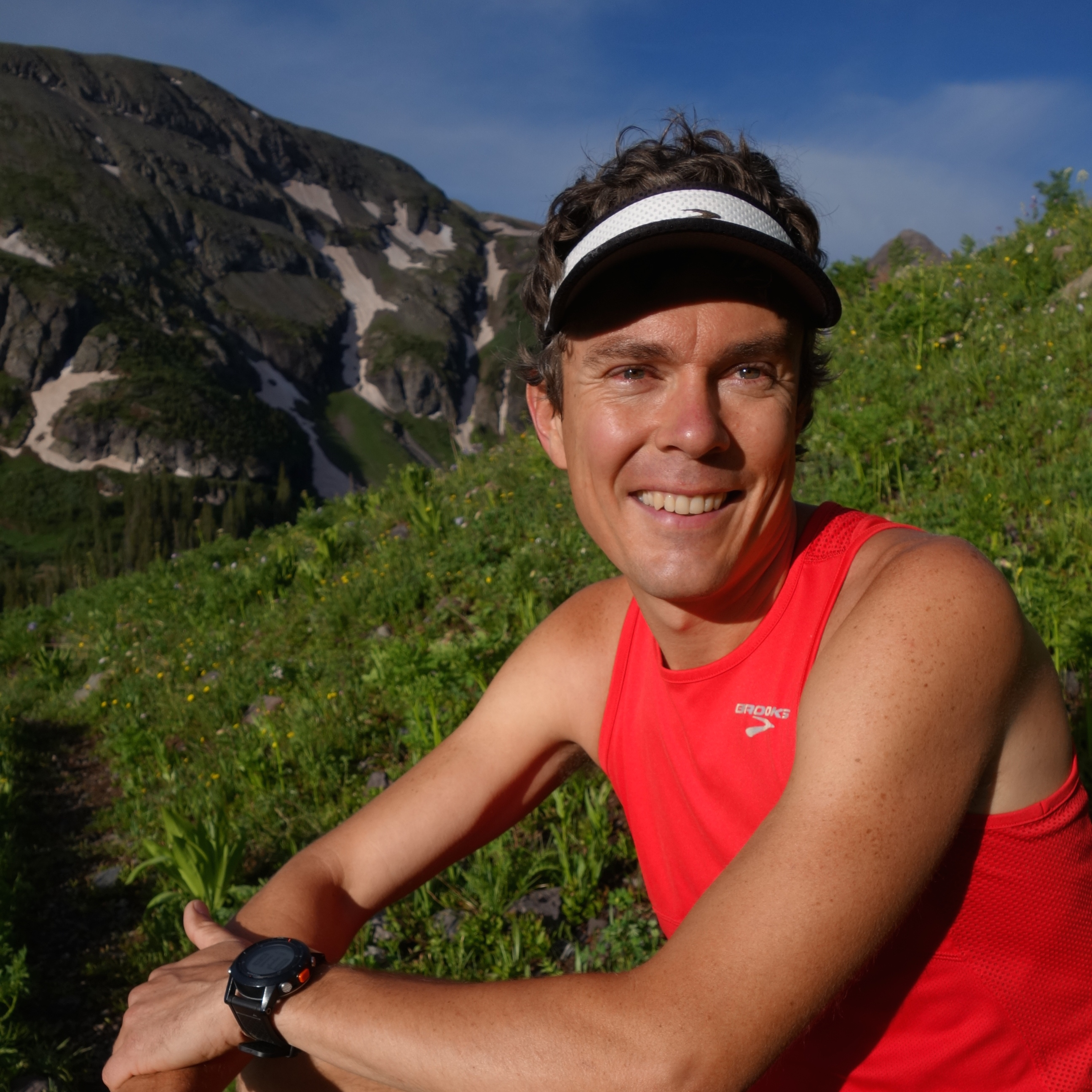
- Jurek in the San Juan Mountains of Colorado (2014)

Personal information
- Born: 26 October 1973 (age 53) Duluth, Minnesota
- Height: 6 ft 2 in (1.88 m)
- Weight: 170 lb (77 kg)
- Website: http://www.scottjurek.com

Sport
- Country: United States
- Event: Ultramarathon
- College team: College of St. Scholastica

Scott Gordon Jurek (born October 26, 1973) is an American ultramarathoner, author, and public speaker. Throughout his running career, Jurek was one of the most dominant ultramarathon runners in the world, winning the Hardrock Hundred (2007), the Badwater Ultramarathon (2005, 2006), the Spartathlon (2006, 2007, 2008), and the Western States 100 Mile Endurance Run (1999–2005). In 2010, at the 24-Hour World Championships in Brive-la-Gaillarde, France, Jurek won a silver medal behind Shingo Inoue and set a new US record for distance run in 24 hours with 165.7 miles (an average pace of 8 minutes and 42 seconds per mile). In 2015, Jurek set the Fastest Known Time running record for the 2,189-mile Appalachian Trail.

Jurek has followed a vegetarian diet since 1997, and a vegan diet since 1999.

== Early life ==
Raised in Proctor, Minnesota, Jurek is of part Polish descent. He is the son of Lynn (née Swapinski) and Gordon Jurek. His childhood involved a strong connection with nature developed through hunting, fishing, and camping with his family. Jurek began trail running as a child but did not run long distances until his sophomore year in high school when he started cross training with running to prepare for Nordic skiing. Although he hated running at first, after spending summers running on trails with ski poles, he found a new passion for trail running. On a challenge from training partner Dusty Olson, Jurek ran the Minnesota Voyageur 50 Mile in 1994, placing second in his first attempt at an ultramarathon, without even having run a marathon in training. Olson later served as Jurek's pacer in many races.

== Education ==
Jurek was the valedictorian of his high school class at Proctor High School. He attended the College of St. Scholastica in Duluth, Minnesota, graduating with a bachelor's degree in Health Science in 1996 and a master's degree in physical therapy in 1998.

== Ultrarunning ==
During his college years, Jurek continued to compete in the 50-mile (80.5 km) Minnesota Voyageur, finishing second in 1994 and 1995 and winning the race in 1996, 1997, and 1998, when he set the current course record of 6:41:16. After graduation, he moved to Seattle, where he began competing on a national level, in 1998 winning the Zane Grey Highline Trail 50 Mile Run and the McKenzie River Trail Run 50K, and placing second in his first 100-mile (161 km) race, the Angeles Crest.

In 1999, Jurek won the 100-mile Western States Endurance Run on his first attempt, defeating five-time champion Tim Twietmeyer and becoming only the second non-Californian to win the race. He would go on to win Western States a record seven consecutive times. In 2004, he bested Mike Morton's 1997 time to set a new course record of 15 hours and 36 minutes.

Over the next five years, Jurek notched victories in the McDonald Forest 50K (1999), the Bull Run Run 50 Mile (1999), the Leona Divide 50 Mile (2000, 2001, 2002, 2004), the Diez Vista 50K (2000-course record, 2003), the Silvertip 50K (2002), and the Miwok 100K (2002, 2003, 2004). In 2004, he completed the "Ultra Running Grand Slam" by finishing Western States, the Leadville 100 (in which he was runner-up), the Vermont 100, and the Wasatch Front 100. He traveled to Hong Kong with Team Montrail to win the 2001 and 2002 Oxfam Trailwalker 100K team trophies, both years setting new course records. Jurek's 2001 teammates were Dave Terry, Ian Torrence, and Nate McDowell. In 2002, he ran with McDowell, Brandon Sybrowsky, and Karl Meltzer. Jurek was also on the winning team of the 2003 Hasegawa Cup Japan Mountain Endurance Run.

In 2005, just a few weeks after winning Western States, Jurek set a new course record in the Badwater Ultramarathon, widely considered one of the world's most difficult races. Jurek came from behind to win despite temperatures of 120 °F (49 °C), dealing with the heat by periodically stopping to immerse himself in a cooler of ice.

Jurek repeated his Badwater victory in 2006, a year that also saw his first of three consecutive victories in the Spartathlon, a 153-mile (246.2 km) race between Athens and Sparta in Greece. In 2007, he also won the Hardrock Hundred, setting a new course record.

In 2006, Jurek traveled to Mexico's Copper Canyon with a group of runners including Christopher McDougall and Jenn Shelton to participate in a race against the Tarahumara organized by Micah True, also known as "Caballo Blanco". Jurek narrowly lost to the fastest Tarahumara runner, Arnulfo Quimare, but in 2007 Jurek returned to win the race. McDougall's book about the 2006 trip, Born to Run, significantly raised Jurek's profile.

On May 14, 2010, in Brive-la-Gaillarde, France, Jurek broke the USATF all-surface record for distance run by an American in 24 hours with 165.7-mile (266.7 km). His finish earned him a silver medal and helped the American men's team take a bronze overall.

Jurek was one of dozens who helped in the search for ultrarunner Micah True after True went missing. True was later found deceased. Chris McDougall tweeted: "Caballo had the only funeral he would have wanted: his friends spent days running in the wilderness in his honor."

On April 14, 2014, Jurek and Rickey Gates became the first North Americans to complete the Bob Graham Round in the UK's rugged Lake District under 24 hours.

In May 2015, Jurek began an attempt to break the supported Appalachian Trail thru-hike speed record, which was 46 days, 11 hours, and 20 minutes to complete the 2,168-mile (3,489 km) route. On July 13, 2015, he completed the trail, breaking the old record by three hours. Jurek's celebration at the finish line sparked controversy when he received three citations from Baxter State Park rangers who said that his hiking party was too large, he consumed alcohol against park policies, and when he spilled champagne it counted as littering. Jurek disputed the citations publicly. The littering charge was dismissed, the group size charge was also dismissed, and Jurek paid $500 for consuming alcohol against park policies.

=== Philosophy ===
Jurek is an advocate of plant-based eating for health and ethical/environmental reasons, and he cites his diet as the key to his athletic performance and recovery. He gave up eating meat in 1997 and became totally plant based in 1999, motivated by the belief that poor nutrition was responsible for the chronic illnesses he saw in his family and in his physical therapy patients.

When Jurek was very young, his mother was diagnosed with multiple sclerosis. He credits her as his major source of strength in the 24-hour race.

Jurek co-authored a memoir with Steve Friedman titled Eat & Run. It was published by Houghton Mifflin Harcourt on June 5, 2012. Eat & Run was a New York Times bestseller, debuting at no.7 in non-fiction and later translated into twenty languages. He wrote a follow-up book, North, with his wife Jenny Jurek in 2018 about his attempt at the fastest known time on the Appalachian Trail.

=== Accomplishments ===
- Held United States record for 24-hour distance on all surfaces (165.7 miles/266.01 kilometers) from 2010 to 2012.
- Won the Spartathlon 153-mile (246 km) race from Athens to Sparta, Greece three consecutive times (2006–2008).
- Won the Hardrock Hundred Mile Endurance Run (2007), and held the record until 2008.
- Won the Western States Endurance Run seven consecutive times (1999–2005), and held the record time (15:36:27 in 2004) until 2010
- Won the Badwater Ultramarathon twice (2005, 2006), and held the course record for two years (2005).
- Finished first three times (2002–2004) and second three times (2001, 2005, 2006) in the Miwok 100K Trail Race.
- Won the Leona Divide 50 Mile Run four times (2000, 2001, 2002, 2004).
- Won the Diez Vista 50K Trail Run twice (2000, 2003).
- Won the Montrail Ultra Cup series twice (2002, 2003).
- Selected as UltraRunning Magazine's North American Male Ultrarunner of the Year in 2003, 2004, 2005, and 2007.
- Set the speed record for completing the Appalachian Trail (approx. 2,200 miles) in 46 days, 8 hours, and 7 minutes in 2015.

== Personal records ==
- 24 hours: 165.7 miles
- 100 Mile Trail: 15h36m, Western States Endurance Run 2004
- 100 K Road: 7h28m, GNC 100K 2001
- 50 Mile Trail: 6h21m, Ice Age 50 Mile 1999
- 50 Mile Road: 5h50m, GNC 2001
- 50 K Trail: 3h04m, Bendistillery 50K 1999
- 26.2 Mile Road Marathon: 2h38m, Austin Marathon 2006

== Personal life ==
Jurek lives in Boulder, Colorado, with his wife Jenny. They have two children, Raven and Evergreen.

An accomplished ultrarunner and amateur chef, Scott Jurek enjoys plant-based cooking inspired by his travels. His active lifestyle includes yoga, cycling, Nordic skiing, and trail maintenance.

== Bibliography ==
- McDougall, Christopher (2009). Born to Run: A Hidden Tribe, Superathletes, and the Greatest Race the World Has Never Seen. New York: Knopf. ISBN 978-0-307-26630-9.
- Jurek, Scott; Friedman, Steve (2012). Eat & Run: My Unlikely Journey to Ultramarathon Greatness. Houghton Mifflin Harcourt. ISBN 978-0547569659.
- Jurek, Scott; Jurek, Jenny (2018). North: Finding My Way While Running the Appalachian Trail. Little, Brown and Company. ISBN 978-0316433792.
