= James A. Corea =

American radio personality (1937–2001)

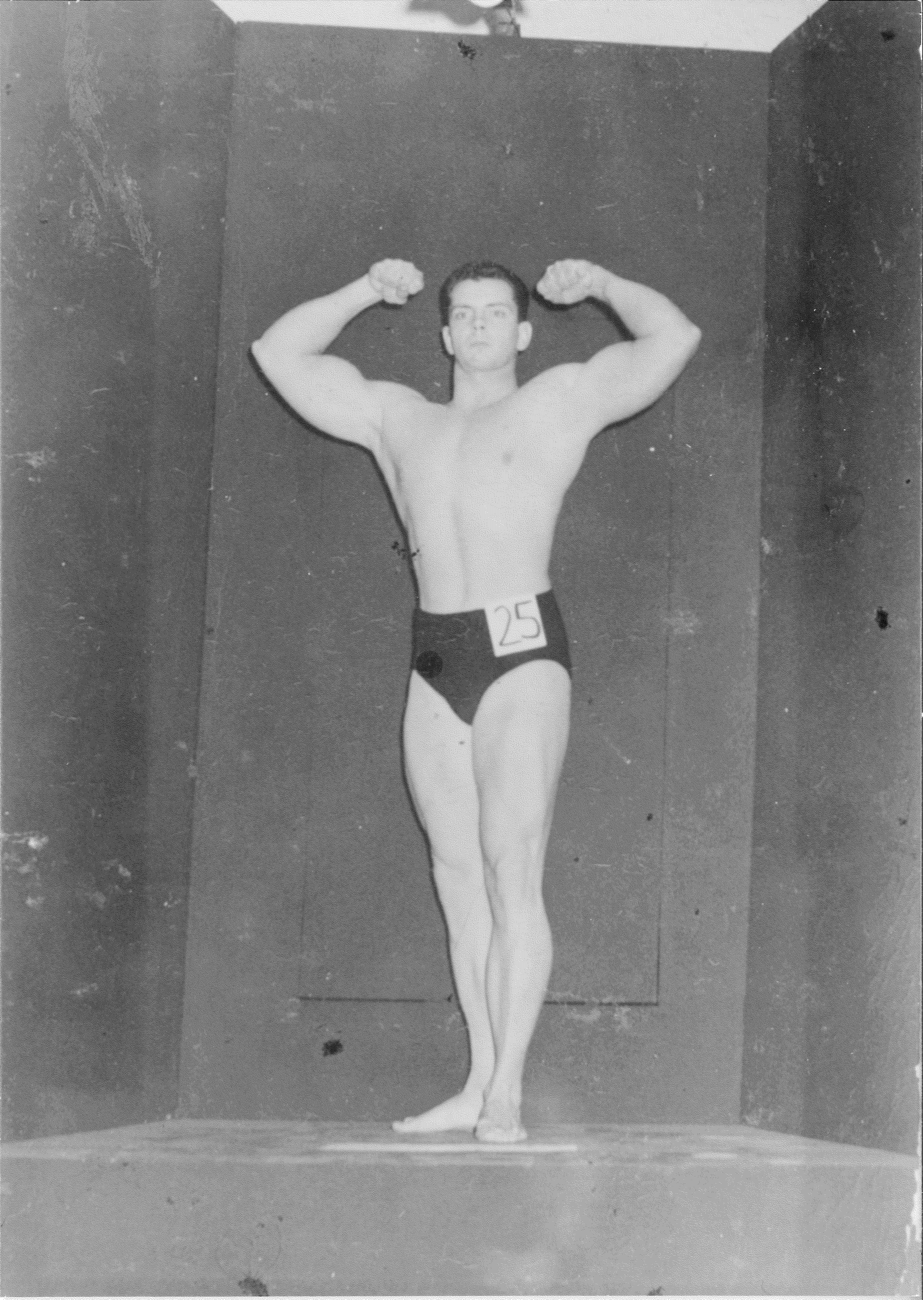
Body Building Photo

James A. Corea (September 25, 1937 – March 3, 2001) was a radio personality and specialist in nutrition, rehabilitation, and sports medicine. He founded Vita-Labs, a brand of health food supplement. He died of a heart attack at age 63. He was married to Barbara L. Caputi in about 1963 and had a daughter, Michelle L. Corea.

== Early life ==
He was born in Camden, New Jersey and graduated from Camden Catholic High School. He spent his early years as an Olympic weightlifter and entering bodybuilding competitions, and won the Mr. Camden County body building competition. He served in the United States Marine Corps and later served in the United States Army Reserve.

He founded a supplement company, Vita-Labs, of Cherry Hill, New Jersey, then called Delaware Township, in 1958. In the 1960s, Corea was a strength coach for the Philadelphia Eagles for a decade. In 1962, he opened the Jim Corea Gym and Athletic Club in Cherry Hill. It was the first of its kind, a full-service gymnasium, which was frequented by many local sport legends in the area. He also operated a gymnasium and physical rehabilitation facility, conducted police academy fitness training and hosted a top-rated radio show on Philadelphia's WWDB. Dr. Jim's show ran on WWDB for over 20 years, and he was a Philadelphia radio icon during his career. In addition, he was a professor at the Philadelphia College of Osteopathic Medicine and one of the most popular naturopathic physicians in the Northeast.

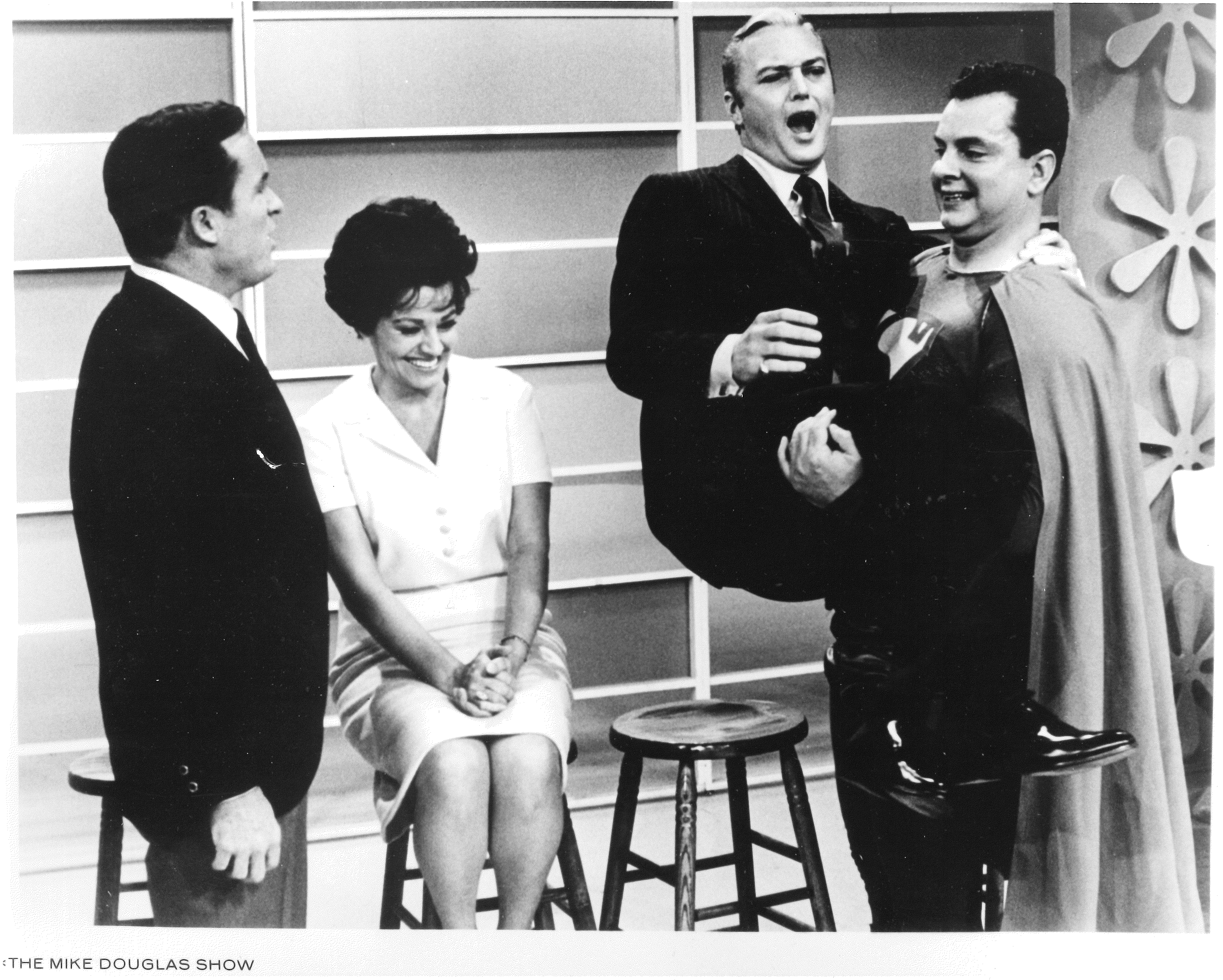
James Corea on the Mike Douglas Show

He lost his radio slot in November 2000, along with all the talk presenters, when the station changed its format from talk to music. He had been offered a new radio job, which he was due to start in 2001.

Dr. James A. Corea, "James A" for short, had a strict set of rules he'd follow. He'd never drunk alcohol in his life, not even a glass of champagne at his wedding. He was proud of his "wheels", reportedly wearing shorts every single day, no matter the weather. He never took vacations, rose at 4:30 every morning and dedicated endless hours to building physical fitness, by lifting weights and running. He placed great emphasis on his nutrition and reduced the risk of any deficiencies by taking a vast array of vitamins and natural supplements.

== Controversy about his death ==
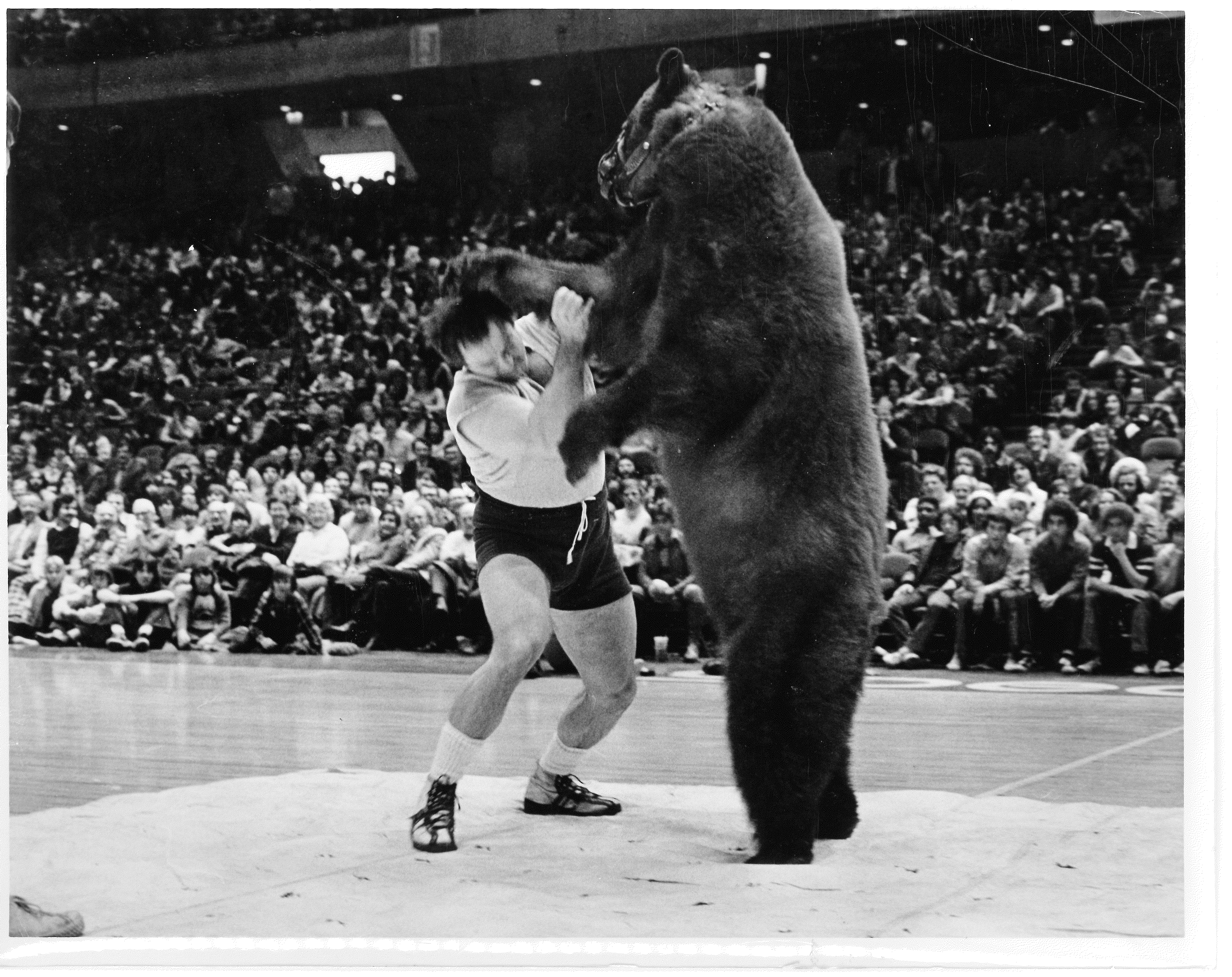
James Corea wrestling bear at the Spectrum in Philadelphia, PA.

A resident of Haddonfield, New Jersey, Corea died at age 63 at Kennedy Memorial Hospitals-University Medical Center in Cherry Hill.

As a notable fitness expert, who advocated and lived the "perfect" diet and exercise regime, it was considered in the press to be a difficult message that he would die of heart disease at the relatively young age of 63. He had consulted a cardiologist who told him his left coronary artery was almost completely blocked and that he should have surgery immediately. Corea refrained, wanting to think about it. He suffered a fatal heart attack 10 days later. Corea had been sick for several weeks with what had been treated as a chest cold but was more likely congestive heart failure from two previous "silent" heart attacks. His family history was full of sudden cardiac related death. His father died at 36, his grandfather at 56 and his grandmother at 64 all from acute cardiac events. Corea never mentioned his family history of heart disease on the air and his death was a serious blow to his many fans and followers who lived, exercised and ate by his personal fitness regime. His death was compared to that of runner Jim Fixx. Like Fixx, his family had a history of heart disease, but it is possible that his lifestyle added many years to his life.

== See also ==
- Jim Fixx
- Bill Smith (fell runner)
- Micah True
