= Endurance running hypothesis =

Human evolution hypothesis

The endurance running hypothesis is a series of conjectures which presume humans evolved anatomical and physiological adaptations to run long distances and, more strongly, that "running is the only known behavior that would account for the different body plans in Homo as opposed to apes or australopithecines".

The hypothesis posits a significant role of endurance running in facilitating early hominins' ability to obtain meat. Proponents of this hypothesis assert that endurance running served as a means for hominins to effectively engage in persistence hunting and carcass poaching, thus enhancing their competitive edge in acquiring prey. Consequently, these evolutionary pressures have led to the prominence of endurance running as a primary factor shaping many biomechanical characteristics of modern humans.

== Evolutionary evidence ==
No primates other than humans are capable of endurance running, and in fact, Australopithecus did not have structural adaptations for running. Instead, forensic anthropology suggests that anatomical features that directly contributed to endurance running capabilities were heavily selected for within the genus Homo dating back to 1.9Ma. Consequently, selecting anatomical features that made endurance running possible radically transformed the hominid body. The general form of human locomotion is markedly distinct from all other animals observed in nature. The unique manner of human locomotion has been described in the Journal of Anatomy:

"… no animal walks or runs as we do. We keep the trunk erect; in walking, our knees are almost straight at mid-stance; the forces our feet exert on the ground are very markedly two-peaked when we walk fast; and in walking and usually in running, we strike the ground initially with the heel alone. No animal walks or runs like that."

More recent research has shown that so-called heelstrike, the tendency of runners to channel all of their weight through the heel as the leading foot touches the ground, is not universal. This may be an artefact of more comfortable shoes, those specifically designed for running. Runners who have only ever gone barefoot tend to land on the front of the foot, on the heads of the fourth and fifth metatarsal bones. When asked to run on a force plate that records the degree of pressure experienced by the foot over the course of a stride barefoot runners display a markedly flatter and less intense force curve, indicating a reduced impact on the bones of their feet. Researchers whose work has elucidated this detail, such as Harvard's Daniel Lieberman, conclude that this was likely the stride of humanity's earliest upright ancestors. Other authors hold that this "barefoot stride" is both less injurious and more efficient than the "shod stride" typical of runners who wear specialized shoes. Their case rests on the traditional grounds that underlie all arguments from human evolution, namely that millions of years of natural selection have optimized the human body for one mode of locomotion and that modern attempts to surpass this through technological interventions, such as engineered running shoes, cannot compete with human anatomy as delivered by evolution.

From the perspective of natural selection, scientists acknowledge that specialization in endurance running would not have helped early humans avoid faster predators over short distances. Instead, it could have allowed them to traverse shifting habitat zones more effectively in the African savannas during the Pliocene. Endurance running facilitated the timely scavenging of large animal carcasses and enabled the tracking and chasing of prey over long distances. This tactic of exhausting prey was especially advantageous for capturing large quadrupedal mammals struggling to thermoregulate in hot weather and over extended distances. Conversely, humans possess efficient means to dissipate heat, primarily through sweating. Specifically, evaporative heat dissipation from the scalp and face prevents hyperthermia and heat-induced encephalitis by extreme cardiovascular loads. Furthermore, as humans continued to develop, their posture became more upright and subsequently increased vertically with the elongation of limbs and torso, effectively increasing surface area for corporeal heat dissipation.

In work exploring the evolution of the human head, paleontologist Daniel Lieberman suggests that certain adaptations to the Homo skull and neck are correlational evidence of traits selective to endurance running optimization. Specifically, he posits that adaptations such as a flattening face and the development of the nuchal ligament promote improved head balance for cranial stabilization during extended periods of running.

Compared to Australopithecus fossil skeletons, selection for walking by itself would not develop some of these proposed "endurance running" derived traits:

- evaporative heat dissipation from the scalp and face prevents hyperthermia
- flatter face makes the head more balanced
- nuchal ligament helps counterbalance the head
- shoulders and body can rotate without rotating the head
- taller body has more skin surface for evaporative heat dissipation
- torso can counter-rotate to balance the rotation of the hindlimbs
- shorter forearms make it easier to counterbalance hindlimbs
- shorter forearms cost less to keep flexed
- backbones are wider, which will absorb more impact
- stronger backbone pelvis connection will absorb more impact
- large gluteal muscles are crucial for erect bipedal locomotion
- longer hindlimbs allow for a longer stride
- Achilles tendon springs conserve energy
- lighter tendons efficiently replace lower limb muscles
- broader hindlimb joints will absorb more impact
- foot bones create a stiff arch for efficient push off
- broader heel bone will absorb more impact
- shorter toes and an aligned big toe provide better push off

== Academic discourse ==
The derived longer hindlimb was already present in Australopithecus along with evidence for foot bones with a stiff arch. Walking and running in Australopithecus may have been the same as early Homo. Research on the former has shown running to be slower and less efficient than in modern humans. Small changes in joint morphology may indicate neutral evolutionary processes rather than selection.

The methodology by which the proposed derived traits were chosen and evaluated does not seem to have been stated, and there were immediate, highly technical arguments "dismissing their validity and terming them either 'trivial' or 'incorrect.'"

Most of those proposed traits have not been tested for their effect on walking and running efficiency. The new trunk shape counter-rotations, which help control rotations induced by hip-joint motion, seem active during walking. Elastic energy storage does occur in the plantar soft tissue of the foot during walking. Relative lower-limb length has a slightly larger effect on the economy of walking than running. The heel-down foot posture makes walking economical but does not benefit running.

Model-based analysis showing that scavengers would reach a carcass within 30 minutes of detection suggests that "endurance running" would not have given earlier access to carcasses and so not result in selection for "endurance running". Earlier access to carcasses may have been selected for running short distances of 5 km or less, with adaptations that generally improved running performance.

The discovery of more fossil evidence resulted in additional detailed descriptions of hindlimb bones with measurable data reported in the literature. From a study of those reports, hindlimb proposed traits were already present in Australopithecus or early Homo. Those hindlimb characteristics most likely evolved to improve walking efficiency with improved running as a by-product.

Gluteus maximus activity was substantially higher in maximal effort jumping and punching than sprinting, and substantially higher in sprinting than in running at speeds that can be sustained. The activity levels are not consistent with the suggestion that the muscle size is a result of selection for sustained endurance running. Additionally, gluteus maximus activity was much greater in sprinting than in running, similar in climbing and running, and greater in running than walking. Increased muscle activity seems related to the speed and intensity of the movement rather than the gait itself. The data suggests that the large size of the gluteus maximus reflects multiple roles during rapid and powerful movements rather than a specific adaptation to submaximal endurance running.
