= Peter A. McCullough =

American COVID contrarian and former cardiologist (born 1962)

- Born: Peter Andrew McCullough; December 29, 1962 (age 63); Buffalo, New York, U.S.

Academic background
- Education: Baylor University (BS); University of Texas Southwestern Medical Center (MD); University of Michigan (MPH)

Academic work
- Discipline: Medicine
- Sub-discipline: Cardiology; Internal medicine

Peter Andrew McCullough (/məˈkʌlə/) (born December 29, 1962) is an American former cardiologist. He was vice chief of internal medicine at Baylor University Medical Center and a professor at Texas A&M University. From the beginnings of the COVID-19 pandemic, McCullough has promoted misinformation and conspiracy theories about COVID-19, its treatments, and mRNA vaccines.

In October 2022, the American Board of Internal Medicine (ABIM) recommended that McCullough's board certifications be revoked due to his promotion of misinformation about COVID-19 vaccines, and by January 2025, the ABIM had revoked both of his certifications.

== Early life ==
Peter Andrew McCullough was born in Buffalo, New York, on December 29, 1962. He earned a Bachelor of Science degree from Baylor University in 1984 and his Doctor of Medicine (MD) degree from the University of Texas Southwestern Medical Center in 1988. He completed his residency in internal medicine at the University of Washington in Seattle, a cardiology fellowship in 1991, and practiced internal medicine in Grayling, Michigan, for two years before enrolling in the University of Michigan School of Public Health, earning a Master of Public Health (MPH) degree in 1994.

== Career ==
After receiving his MPH, McCullough was a cardiovascular fellow at William Beaumont Hospital in the Detroit metropolitan area until 1997. He then worked at the Henry Ford Heart and Vascular Institute in Detroit until 2000, served as section chief of cardiology of the University of Missouri–Kansas City School of Medicine, and returned to William Beaumont Hospital where he worked from 2002 to 2010. He spent the next four years as chief academic and scientific officer of the St. John Providence Health System, Detroit, before joining the Baylor University Medical Center in 2014.

In February 2021, McCullough entered into a confidential separation agreement with Baylor Scott & White Medical Center. In July, in response to his promotion of misinformation about COVID-19, Baylor sued McCullough to prevent him falsely claiming any current association with Baylor Health. On January 17, 2023, the 191st Judicial District Court of Dallas County, Texas dismissed the case. While details were not disclosed, according to The Texan, "[v]oluntary dismissal of claims with prejudice are usually entered after a settlement agreement has been reached."

McCullough is a founder and (as of 2021) president of the now defunct Cardio Renal Society of America and co-editor-in-chief of Cardiorenal Medicine, the society's journal, and also editor of Reviews in Cardiovascular Medicine. He has conducted several studies on running and heart disease, and co-described the term Phidippides cardiomyopathy, a heart condition found in some high endurance athletes. McCullough's other research projects have included the relationship between heart disease and kidney disease and risk factors for heart disease. He is a member of the conservative advocacy group Association of American Physicians and Surgeons and has advocated conspiracy theories promoted by the group.

McCullough has served as Chief Scientific Officer for The Wellness Company, a Florida-based dietary supplement and telehealth company, since its founding in June 2022.

== COVID-19 ==
During the COVID-19 pandemic, McCullough advocated for early treatment using the discredited treatments hydroxychloroquine and ivermectin, criticized the response of the National Institutes of Health and the Food and Drug Administration, dissented from public health recommendations, and contributed to COVID-19 misinformation.

=== Early advocacy for hydroxychloroquine ===
In April 2020, McCullough led a study of the medication hydroxychloroquine as a treatment for COVID-19 for the Baylor Scott & White Medical Center. McCullough told The Wall Street Journal that the urgency of the public health crisis justified compromises on best practices in medical research. In July, after major studies found hydroxychloroquine was ineffective against COVID-19 and the Food and Drug Administration revoked its emergency use authorization (EUA), McCullough supported a second EUA.

In August 2020, McCullough, Harvey Risch of the Yale School of Public Health, and 21 co-authors published an observational study proposing an early outpatient treatment regimen for COVID-19 in the American Journal of Medicine. Based on previous evidence, the article made recommendations for treating ambulatory COVID-19 patients, but presented no new evidence. The article was shared on social media, mainly by groups which had previously published COVID-19 misinformation, in posts falsely interpreting the publication as an official endorsement by the journal itself of hydroxychloroquine as a treatment for COVID-19. The Ministry of Health of Brazil endorsed the article on its website, contributing to a severe COVID-19 misinformation problem in Brazil. The article was criticized in letters to the editors; the editors responded that the article included some "hopeful speculations ... What seemed reasonable last summer based on laboratory experiments has subsequently been shown to be untrue".

McCullough and Risch were two of three witnesses called by committee chair Senator Ron Johnson to testify before a United States Senate Committee on Homeland Security and Governmental Affairs hearing on COVID-19 treatments held in November 2020. McCullough testified in support of social distancing, vaccination, and controversial treatments, including hydroxychloroquine. Ashish Jha, dean of the Brown University School of Public Health, called to testify by the ranking member, said the "clear consensus in the medical and scientific community, based on overwhelming evidence" is that hydroxychloroquine is ineffective as a treatment for COVID-19. McCullough said Jha was promoting misinformation and Jha's opposition to the drug was "reckless and dangerous for the nation". Jha responded on The New York Times opinion page, "By elevating witnesses who sound smart but endorse unfounded therapies, we risk jeopardizing a century's work of medical progress."

=== COVID-19 misinformation ===
Some of McCullough's public statements contributed to the spread of COVID-19 misinformation.

McCullough testified before a committee of the Texas Senate in March 2021, posted to YouTube by the fringe Association of American Physicians and Surgeons, in which he made false claims about COVID-19 and COVID-19 vaccines, including that people under 50 years of age and survivors do not need the vaccine and that there is no evidence of asymptomatic spread of COVID-19.

Posted on the Canadian online video sharing platform Rumble, McCullough gave an interview in April 2021 to The New American, the magazine of the right-wing John Birch Society, in which he advanced anti-vaccination messaging, including falsely claiming huge numbers of fatalities attributed to the COVID-19 vaccines. In May 2021, McCullough gave an interview in which he made claims about COVID-19 and COVID-19 vaccines which were "inaccurate, misleading and/or unsupported by evidence", including that survivors cannot be re-infected and so do not require vaccination and that the vaccines are dangerous.

During television appearances, McCullough contradicted public health recommendations, including when asked about the aggressive spread of COVID-19 among children, by suggesting that healthy persons under 30 had no need for a vaccine, and when asked about the relative merits of vaccination-induced immunity versus "natural" (survivor) immunity, by disputing the necessity of vaccinations to achieve herd immunity. In December 2021, McCullough appeared on the Joe Rogan Experience promoting debunked conspiracy theories and misinformation (e.g. the COVID-19 pandemic was planned, the spike protein causes cell death, medical authorities are conspiring to illegitimately suppress hydroxychloroquine and ivermectin).

In October 2022, the American Board of Internal Medicine recommended that McCullough's board certifications be revoked due to his promotion of misinformation about COVID-19 vaccines, and by January 2025, the ABIM had revoked his certifications for Cardiovascular Disease and Internal Medicine.

He is a co-author of a 2023 review, "A systematic review of autopsy findings in deaths after COVID-19 vaccination", that was retracted and heavily criticized for its methodological errors. In 2024, he co-authored another narrative review: "COVID-19 mRNA Vaccines: Lessons Learned from the Registrational Trials and Global Vaccination Campaign", where he claims COVID-19 vaccines have killed nearly 14 times as many people as they saved. The article, which uncritically cites erroneous previous analysis as evidence, was also retracted.

His 2025 self-published report, "Determinants of Autism Spectrum Disorder", argues for a long-debunked connection between vaccines and autism. The report introduces no original data or analysis, and no independent verification of the studies it cites, simply restating already discredited and outdated work. That same year, he also co-authored a withdrawn preprint titled "Synthetic mRNA Vaccines and Transcriptomic Dysregulation: Evidence from New-Onset Adverse Events and Cancers Post-Vaccination", which was also heavily criticized for its methodological errors.

== Selected publications ==
- McCullough, Peter A.; Ronco, Claudio, eds. (2020). Textbook of Cardiorenal Medicine. London: Springer Nature. ISBN 978-3-030-57459-8.
- Rangaswami, Janani; Lerma, Edgar V.; McCullough, Peter A., eds. (2020). Kidney Disease in the Cardiac Catheterization Laboratory: A Practical Approach. London: Springer Nature. ISBN 978-3-030-45413-5.
- Leake, John; McCullough, Peter A.; Kennedy, Robert F. Jr. (2022). The Courage to Face COVID-19: Preventing Hospitalization and Death While Battling the Bio–Pharmaceutical Complex. Skyhorse Publishing. ISBN 978-1-5107-7680-7.
