= Copper Canyon =

Series of large canyons in Chihuahua, Mexico

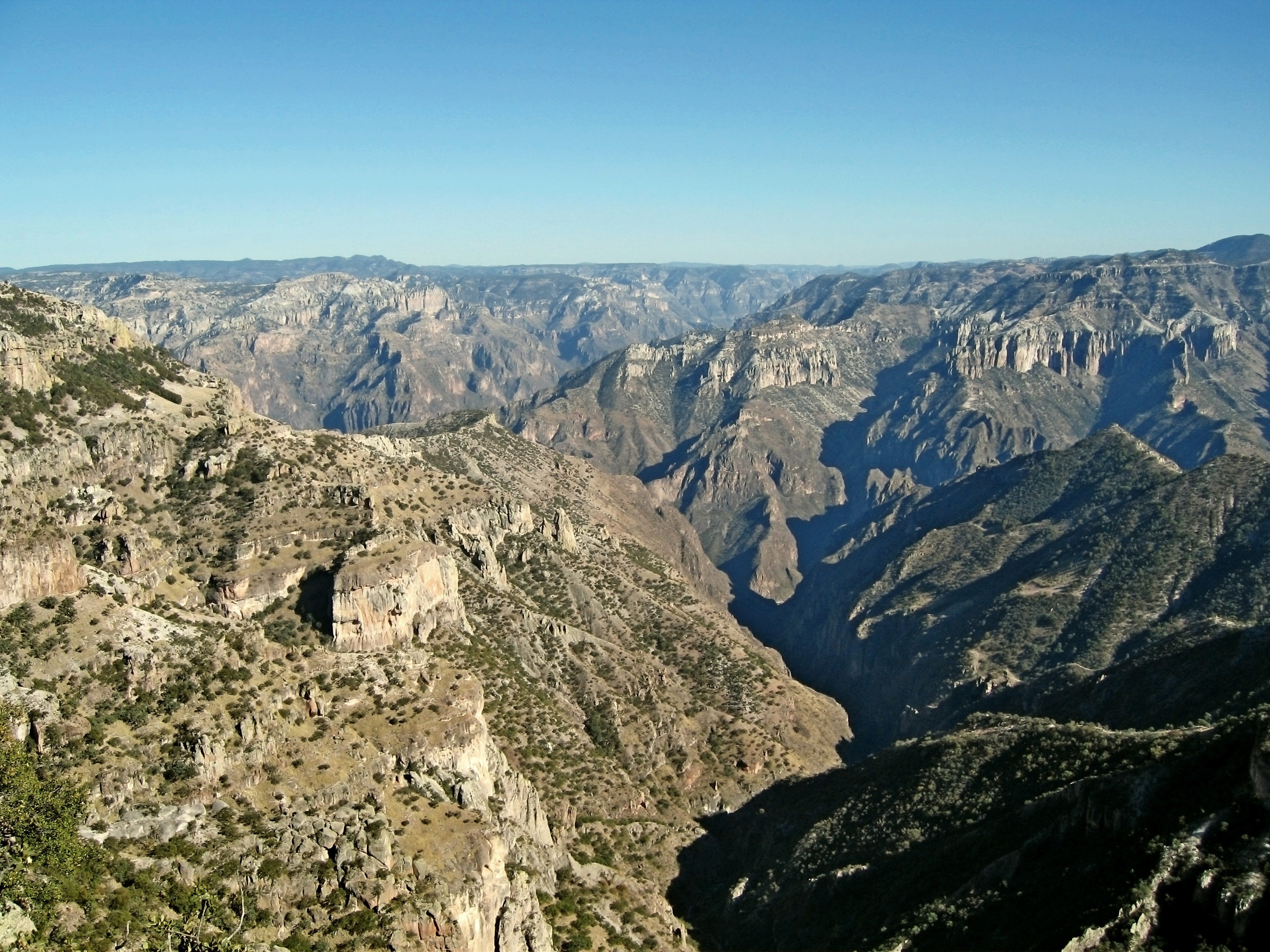
- Copper Canyon

- Location within Mexico Location within Chihuahua

Naming
- Native name: Barrancas del Cobre (Spanish)

Geography
- Location: Sierra Madre Occidental
- Country: Mexico
- State: Chihuahua
- Coordinates: 27.51611°N 107.76583°W
- Interactive map of Copper Canyon

Copper Canyon (Spanish: Barrancas del Cobre) is a system of six distinct canyons in the Sierra Madre Occidental in the southwestern part of the state of Chihuahua in northwestern Mexico that is 65,000 square kilometres (25,000 sq mi) in size. The canyons were formed by six rivers that drain the western side of the Sierra Tarahumara (a part of the Sierra Madre Occidental). All six rivers merge into the Rio Fuerte and empty into the Gulf of California. The walls of the canyon are a copper/green color, which is the origin of the name.

== History ==
The New Spanish arrived in the Copper Canyon area in the 17th century and encountered the indigenous locals throughout Chihuahua. For the New Spanish, America was a new land to exploit for gold and silver and also to spread Christianity. The New Spanish named the people they encountered "Tarahumara", derived from the word Rarámuri, which is what the indigenous people call their men. Some scholars theorize that this word may mean 'The running people'. During the 17th century, silver was discovered by the Hispanic in the land of the Tarahumara tribe. Some were enslaved for mining efforts. There were small uprisings by the Tarahumara, but with little to no avail. They eventually were forced off the more desirable lands and up into the canyon cliffs.

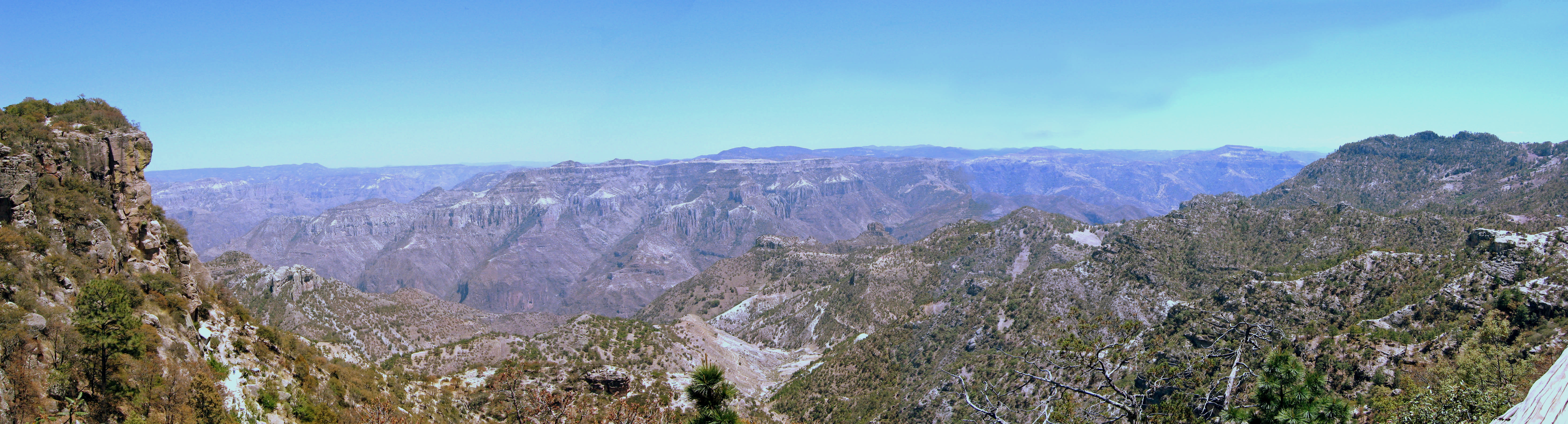

== Climate ==
The alpine climate of the mountainous regions of Copper Canyon has moderate temperatures from October to November and March to April. The bottom of the canyons are humid and warm and remain that way throughout the year. During the warmest months, April through June, drought is a chronic problem with little rainfall until July when the rainy season begins.

== Flora and fauna ==
The Sierra Tarahumara Occidental region contains numerous species of pine and oak trees. Mexican Douglas-fir (Pseudotsuga lindleyana) trees cover the high plateaus in altitudes over 2,400 metres (8,000 ft), but due to deforestation in the area, many species of wildlife are endangered. Cougars live in the remotest of regions and are rarely seen. After the summer rainy season these upper regions blossom with wildflowers until October.

From 1,200–2,400 metres (4,000–8,000 ft), oak trees grow in the huge forests as well as the more shade-tolerant types of trees. In the fall the forests become brilliant with color from Andean alder (Alnus acuminata) and poplar (Populus spp.) trees. Brushwood and scrubby trees grow on the canyon slopes, which can accommodate the dry season. Huge fig (Ficus spp.) and palm trees thrive at the bottom where water is plentiful and the climate is tropical.

== Threats to the ecosystem ==
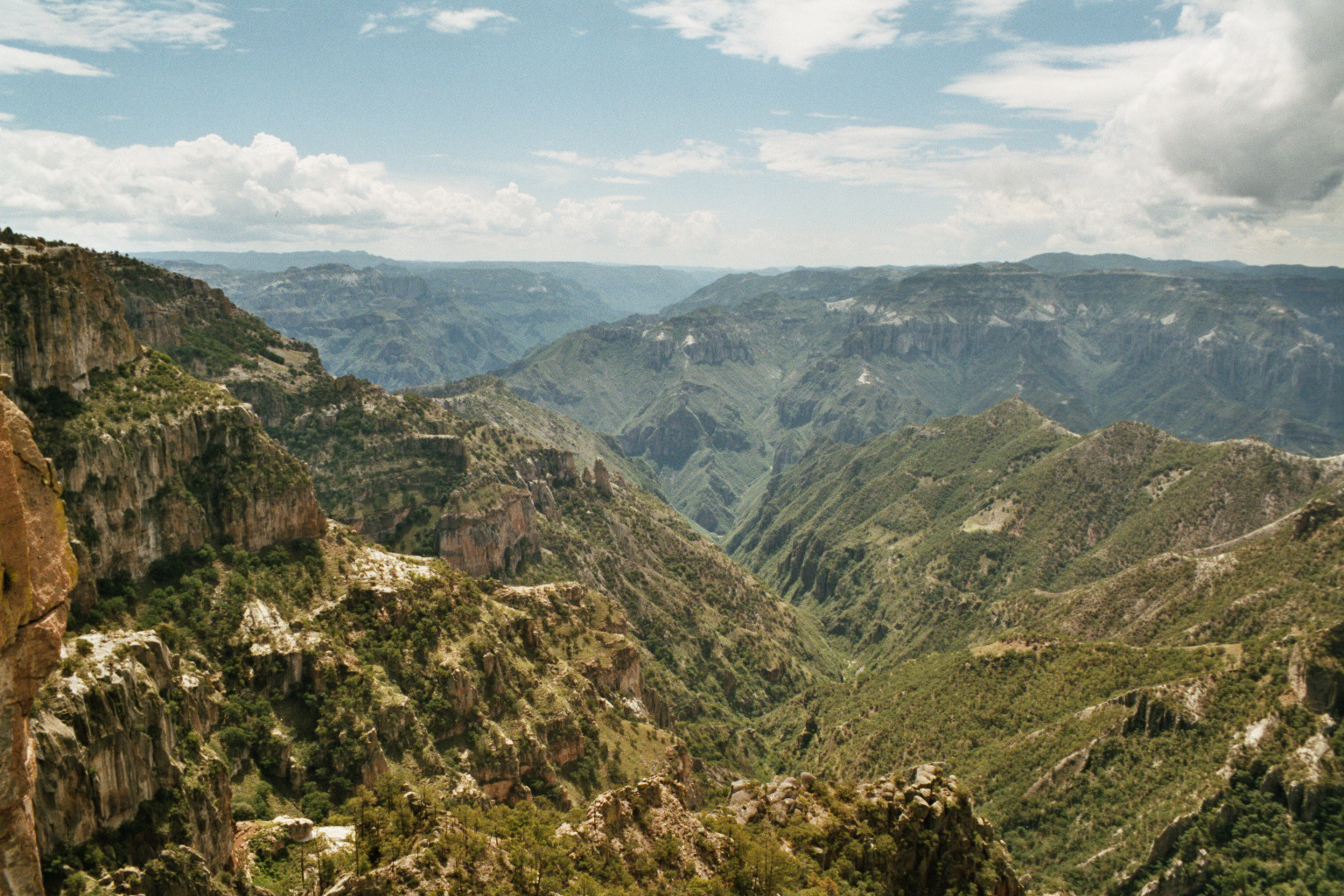
Rio Urique, Copper Canyon.

Due to increases in human population, there are many threats to the ecosystems of the Sierra Tarahumara Occidental region. The government funding to build a "tourist friendly" atmosphere poses threats to the environment and indigenous cultures. Roads have been built in the former isolated mountainous zones. Agriculture and grazing as well as the cutting of hardwoods and other trees for firewood has accelerated a soil erosion problem. Mesquite (Prosopis spp.) and desert ironwood (Olneya tesota) trees are cut and exported primarily to the U.S. for charcoal. Amapa (Tabebuia chrysantha) trees yield highly prized lumber for building and furniture making. Other trees are also cut and sold for their high-priced lumber. Over-harvesting of the forests in the area has caused the extinction of the imperial woodpecker and Mexican wolf. Approximately, two percent of the original old-growth forest remains. However, a massive forest-harvesting project in the region has been abandoned, for now, by the World Bank. The Mexican forestry department deemed these species of trees "legally protected," but enforcement is difficult.

The government has taken measures to halt or slow down the cultivation of opium poppies and cannabis by spraying crops with herbicides, which threaten the populations of many different species. A large saturniid moth, Rothschildia cincta, is one of the species that are threatened by the spraying. Their cocoons are used by the native population for ceremonial purposes.

Open-pit mining for copper, gold and other metals not only produces air pollution from smelters, but has been linked to the serious decline of the Tarahumara frog (Rana tarahumarae). Every river system has been dammed causing fresh water shortages in nearby desert communities. An enormous dam is being constructed on the Rio Fuerte, which poses major environmental problems and may lead to massive losses of tropical forest and habitats.

Conservation is underway, but remains informal and slow. Mexico has environmental laws, but suffers from lack of financial resources. Enforcement has been lax or non-existent. Agencies are actively trying to increase the protection for natural preserves.

== Indigenous people ==
Copper Canyon traditional inhabitants are the Tarahumara or Rarámuri. With no official census, the population of the Rarámuri people is estimated at 70,000. Many Rarámuri reside in the cooler, mountainous regions during the hot summer months and migrate deeper into the canyons in the cooler winter months, where the climate is more temperate. Their survival strategies have been to occupy areas that are too remote for city people, way off-the-beaten-path to remain isolated and independent so as to avoid losing their culture.

Tourism is a growing industry for Copper Canyon, but the acceptance of it is debated in the local communities. Some communities accept government funding for building roads, restaurants and lodging to make the area attractive for tourists. Many other groups of Rarámuri maintain their independence by living in areas that are as far away from city life as possible. Their way of life is protected by the mountainous landscape.

Their diet is largely domestic agrarian but does consist of meat from domesticated cows, chickens and goats, wild game and freshwater fish. Corn (maize) is the most important staple of the Rarámuri's diet.

The Rarámuri people are known for their endurance running. Living in the canyons, they travel great vertical distances, which they often do by running nonstop for hours. A popular Rarámuri community race called rarajipari, is played by kicking a wooden ball along the paths of the steep canyons.

== Tourism ==
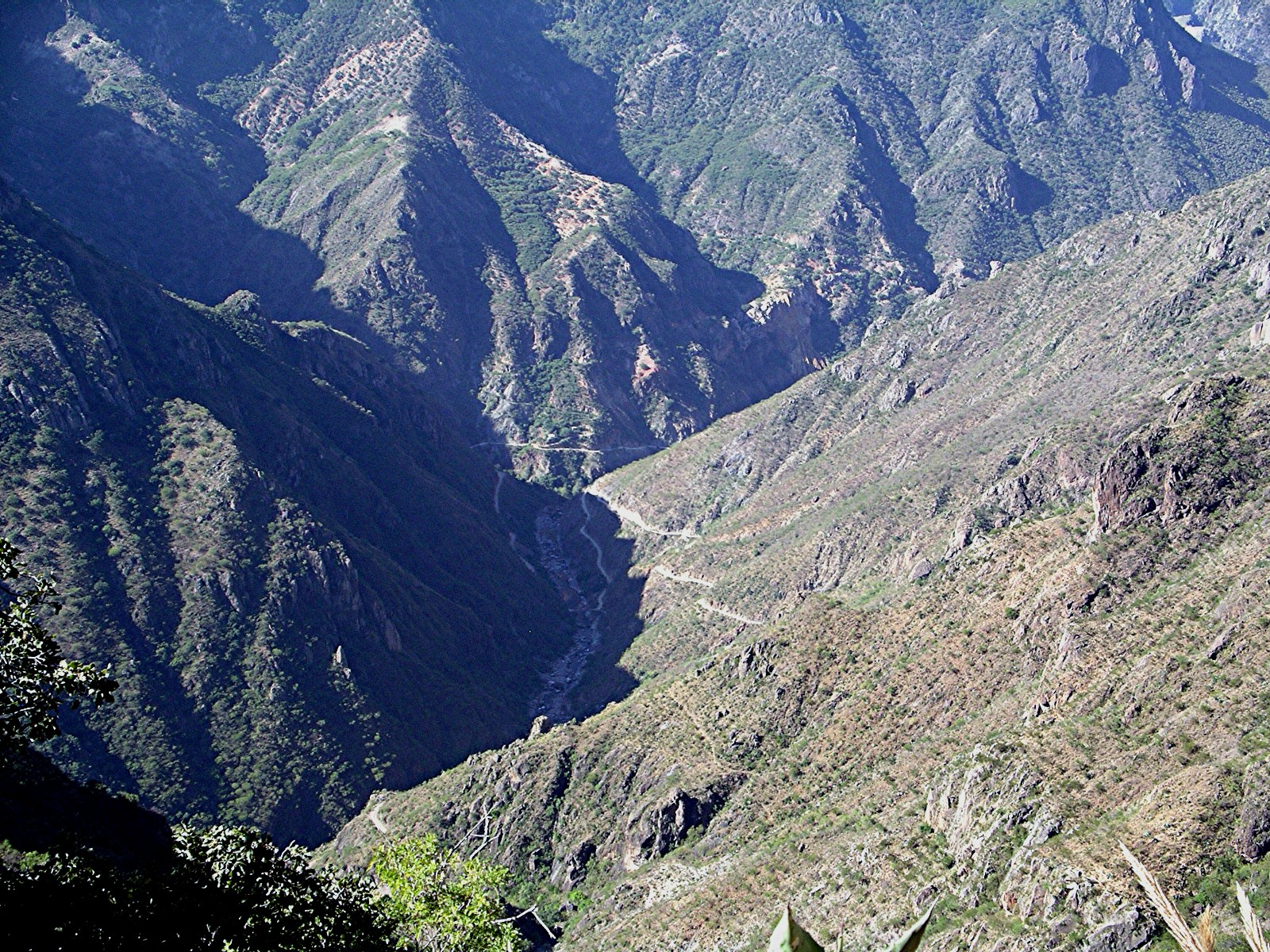
The road to Batopilas descends into Copper Canyon.

There are many other ways to explore Copper Canyon such as hiking, biking, driving or horseback riding. The most popular way is by train, as the Ferrocarril Chihuahua al Pacífico or ChePe, runs along the main canyon called Canyon Urique, between Chihuahua and Los Mochis, on the Gulf of California.

The Chihuahua al Pacifico began in the late 19th century. The Mexican Revolution, lack of funding, and the overall difficulty of building a railroad over such terrain hindered its completion until 1961. The railroad comprises 652 kilometres (405 mi) of rails with 39 bridges and 86 tunnels. The total trip takes approximately 15 hours and passes through towns, as well as the towering cliffs of the canyons. Along the railway, many Tarahumarans lay out their food, crafts and other wares for sale.

Mexico established the Parque Nacional Barranca del Cobre (Copper Canyon National Park) to showcase this remote area. The park is located in the municipalities of Batopilas, Bocoyna, Guachochi, and Urique.

The Basaseachic Falls National Park around the Basaseachic Falls is located within the canyon area.

== Cities and towns ==
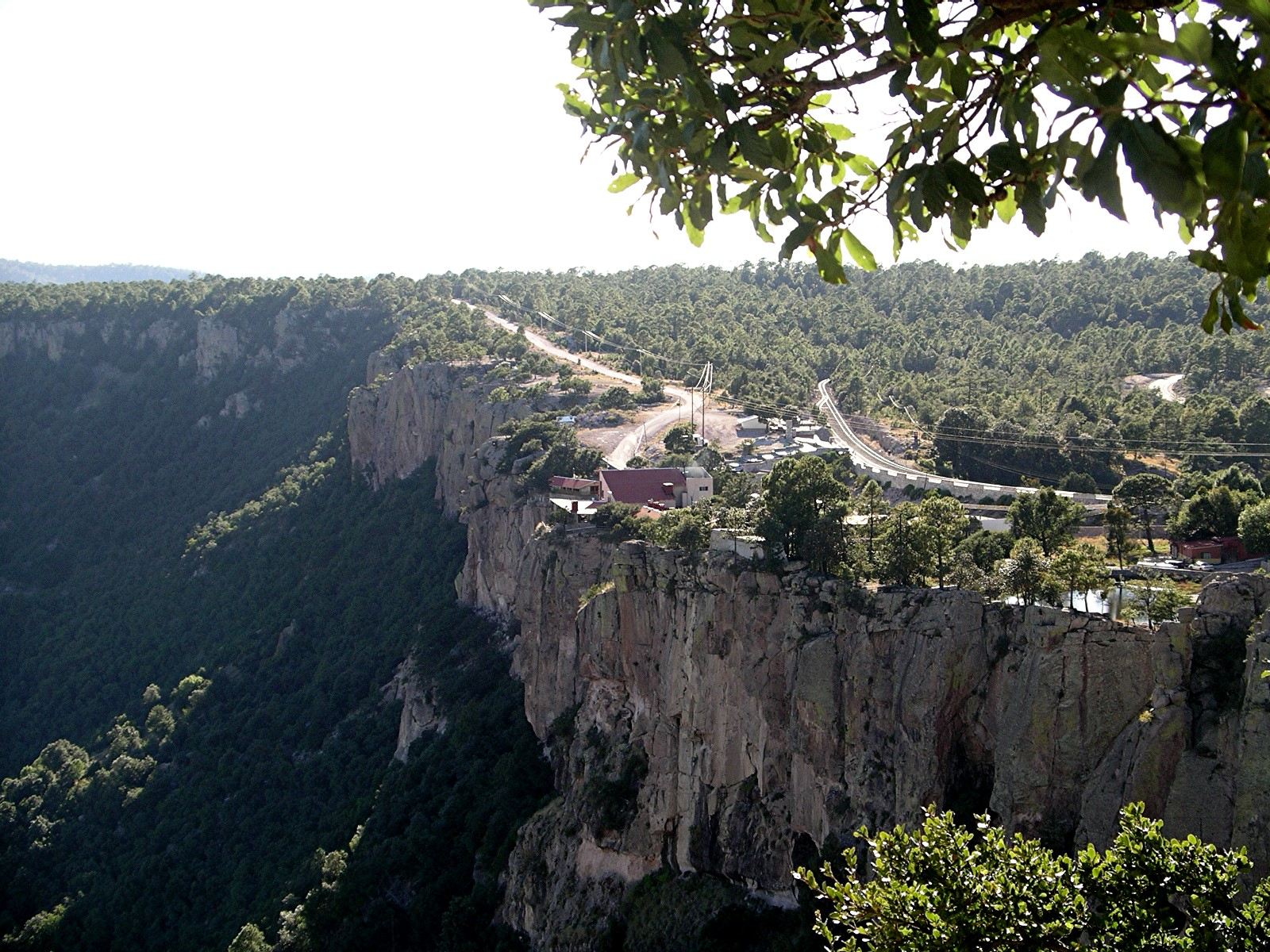
A hotel at Divisadero perches on the rim of Copper Canyon. The railroad runs nearby.

Among the villages located in or on the Copper Canyon are:

- Bahuichivo, ChePe train stop for Cerocahui, Urique, Piedras Verdes, Tubares
- Basaseachi, located near the 260 m (840 ft) Cascada Basaseachi waterfall in the Barranca Candameña. The towns and ranchos of San Lorenzo, Cahuisori, and Huahumar encircle the rim of the canyon, also home to Mexico's highest waterfall Piedra Volada (366 m (1,200 ft)). It is on the main Federal Highway 16 between Chihuahua, Chihuahua, and Hermosillo, Sonora. The Rio Candameña is a tributary of the Rio Mayo which flows into the Gulf of California.
- Batopilas, elevation 600 m (1,970 ft), a town on the Batopilas River at the bottom of a canyon; first established by the Spanish around 1632 to mine silver. It is located 30 km (19 mi) southeast of Urique.
- Bocoyna, 30 km (19 mi) east of Creel, and on the eastern escarpment of the continental divide. The nearby Rio Conchos flows into the Rio Bravo (Rio Grande) on the Mexico-Texas border. Carichí, Sisoguichi, and Panalachi are important Tarahumara settlements on the Rio Conchos drainage system.
- Cerocahui, 14 km (8.7 mi) S. of the train stop at Bahuichivo.
- Creel, atop the canyon and, at 2,350 metres (7,710 ft) altitude, marking one of the highest points on the ChePe railroad route (San Juanito is higher at 2,405 metres (7,890 ft)); a central point for commerce and tourism.
- Divisadero, a key train stop and vista point with views down into the Urique Canyon of the Barranca del Cobre. The ChePe train allows a 15-20 minute stop for visitors wishing to see the view. Divisadero and nearby Areponapuchi located 4 km (2.5 mi) south are major canyon-rim trailheads for hiking into the Rio Urique canyon. This high mesa is home to three tourist class hotels located on the canyon rim, as well as several guesthouses.
- Témoris, a dual town located 400 m (1,300 ft) apart in elevation. The ChePe train traverses the valley 3 times including a 1,600-metre (1 mi) long tunnel to gain elevation. Located on the Rio Septentrion, lower Temoris is at 1,000 m (3,280 ft).
- Urique, 560 m (1,840 ft). Located at the bottom of the canyon rim below Bahuichivo, on the Urique River. It is 30 km (19 mi) NW of Batopilas, now connected by a rough road.

== In popular culture ==
Copper Canyon was featured on Season 1 Episode 12, of Man vs. Wild on the Discovery Channel, on Raramuri Tale.

The nonfiction book Born to Run by Christopher McDougall, chronicling the story of ultra-runner Micah True in the Copper Canyon with the Tarahumara Indians, who taught him a better way to run. True was the race director of the Copper Canyon Ultra Marathon, which ends in Urique's plaza. The race covers 50 miles (80 km) of single track trail and dirt road.

== See also ==
- Carl Lumholtz
