= Persistence hunting =

Hunting until the prey animal can no longer flee

Persistence hunting, also known as endurance hunting or long-distance hunting, is a variant of pursuit predation in which a predator will bring down a prey item via indirect means, such as exhaustion, heat illness or injury. Hunters of this type will typically display adaptions for distance running, such as longer legs, temperature regulation, and specialized cardiovascular systems.

Some endurance hunters may prefer to injure prey in an ambush before the hunt and rely on tracking to find their quarry. Hadza hunter-gatherers do not persistence hunt, but they do run in short bursts while hunting small game.

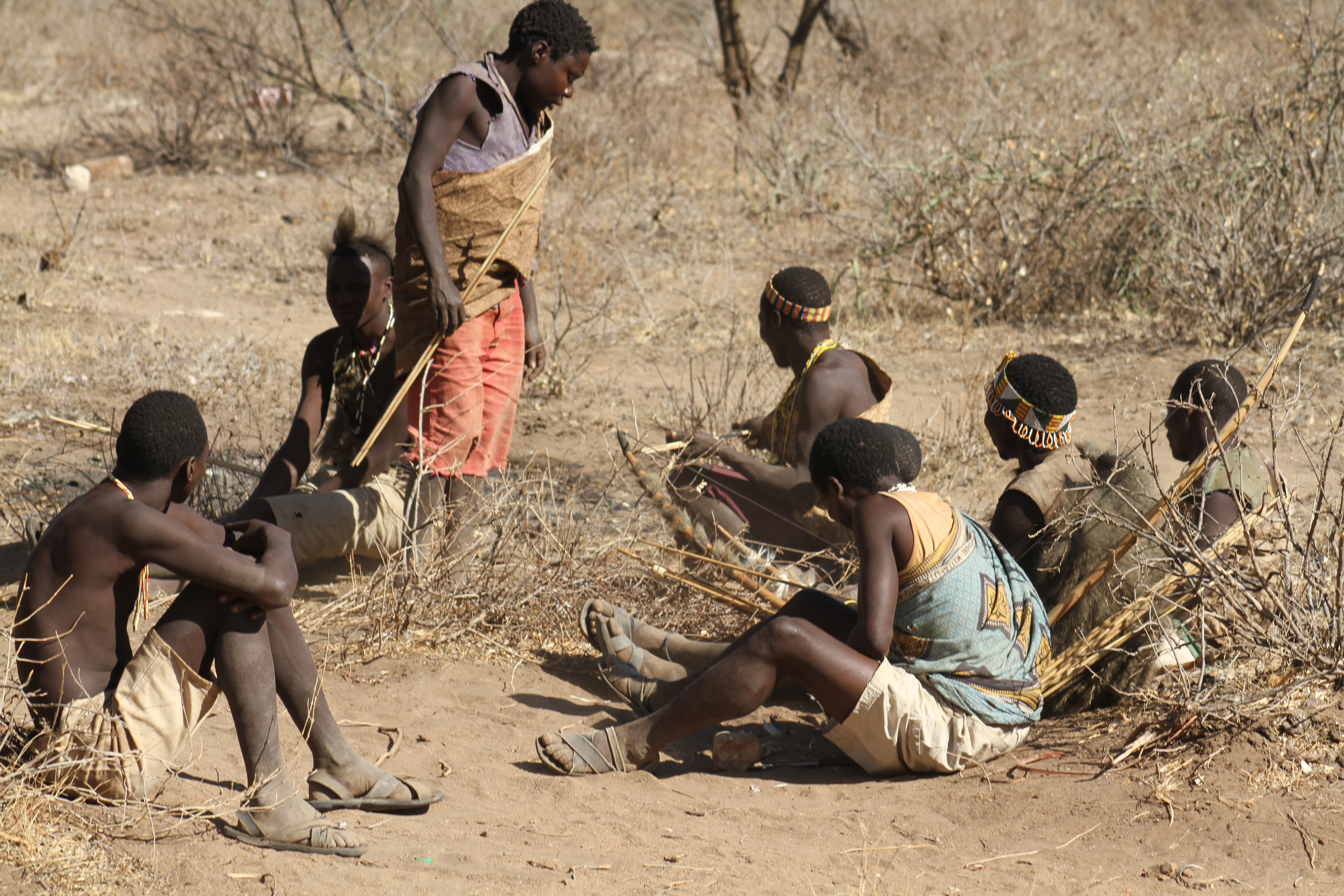
Hadza hunting party

== Humans and ancestors ==
While humans are not the fastest nor the strongest, humans are amongst the best long distance runners in the animal kingdom, with proportionally long legs, as well as other cursorial adaptations of genus Homo not seen in arboreal hominids like chimpanzees and orangutans.

Persistence hunting can be done by walking, but with a 30 to 74% lower rate of success than by running or intermittent running. Furthermore, while needing 10 to 30% less energy, it takes twice as long. Walking down prey, however, might have arisen in Homo erectus, preceding endurance running. Homo erectus may have lost its hair to enhance heat dissipation during persistence hunting, which would explain the origin of a characteristic feature of the genus Homo.

The practice was reported as abandoned in most places before the late 20th century, but the San people and other hunter-gatherer tribes are known to have used it in the 21st century. A 2024 study found hundreds of recorded examples of this method being practiced on all inhabited continents.

== Other mammals ==
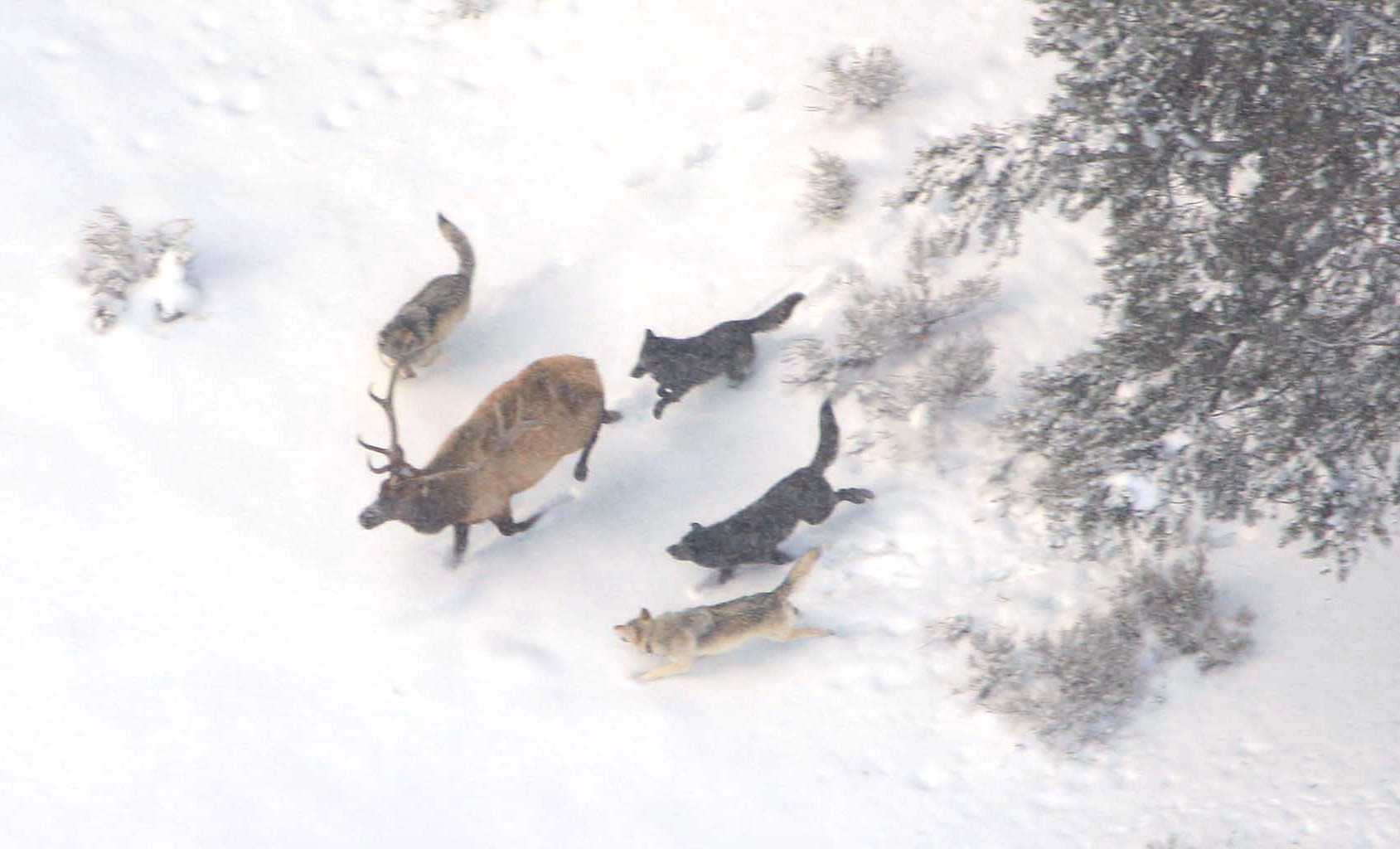
Wolf pack hunting a bull elk

Wolves, dingoes, and painted dogs are known for running large prey down over long distances. All three species will inflict bites in order to further weaken the animal over the course of the hunt. Canids will also pant when hot. This has the double effect of cooling the animal via the evaporation of saliva while also increasing the amount of oxygen absorbed by the lungs. Despite their similar body shape, other canids are opportunistic generalists that can be broadly categorized as pursuit predators.

Wolves may have been initially domesticated due to their similar hunting techniques to humans. Several breeds of domestic dog have been bred with endurance in mind, such as the malamute, husky and Eskimo dog.

Spotted hyenas utilize a variety of hunting techniques depending on their chosen prey. They will occasionally use a similar strategy to canid endurance hunters.

== Reptiles ==
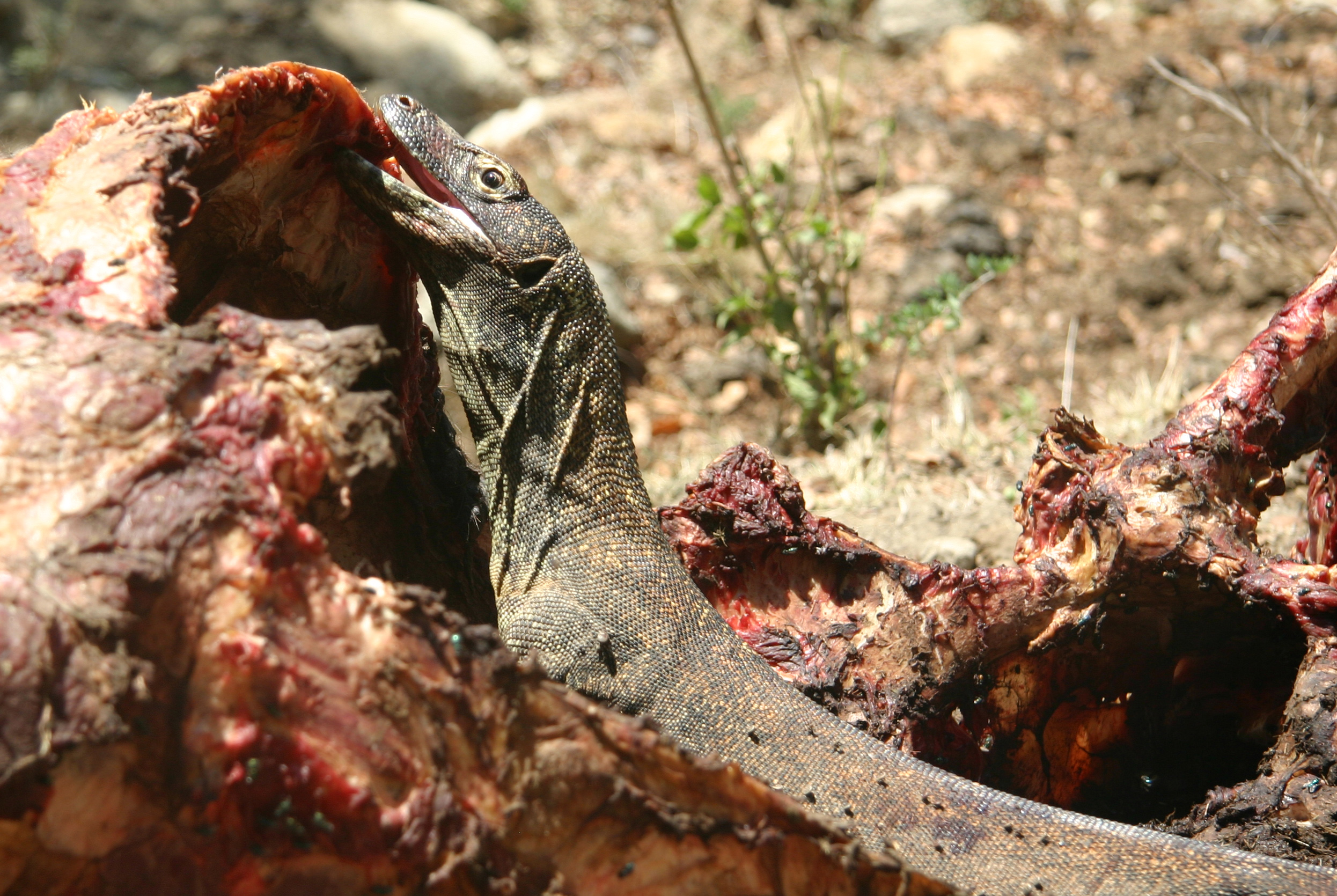
Komodo dragon eating a water buffalo. Persistence predators can hunt prey many times their size.

No extant members of Archelosauria are known to be long-distance hunters, though various bird species may employ speedy pursuit predation. Living crocodilians and carnivorous turtles are specialized ambush predators and rarely if ever chase prey over great distances.

Within Squamata, varanid lizards possess a well developed ventricular septum that completely separates the pulmonary and systemic sides of the circulatory system during systole—this unique heart structure allows varanids to run faster over longer distances than other lizards. They also utilize a forked tongue to track injured prey over large distances after a failed ambush. Several monitor lizard species such as Komodo dragons also utilize venom to ensure the death of their prey.

== Extinct species ==
Sprawling and erect hip joints - horizontal

Little evidence exists for endurance hunting in extinct species, though potential candidates include the dire wolf Aenocyon dirus due to its similar body shape to modern grey wolves.

Non-avian theropod dinosaurs such as derived tyrannosauroids and troodontids display cursorial adaptions which may have allowed for long-distance running. Derived theropods may have also had an avian style flow-through lung, allowing for highly efficient oxygen exchange.

Some non-mammalian theriodonts may have been capable of running relatively long distances due to their limbs having an erect stance as opposed to the sprawling stance of contemporary synapsids and reptiles.

== See also ==
- Tracking (hunting)
