= Cerocahui =

Town in the Mexican state of Chihuahua

- Town
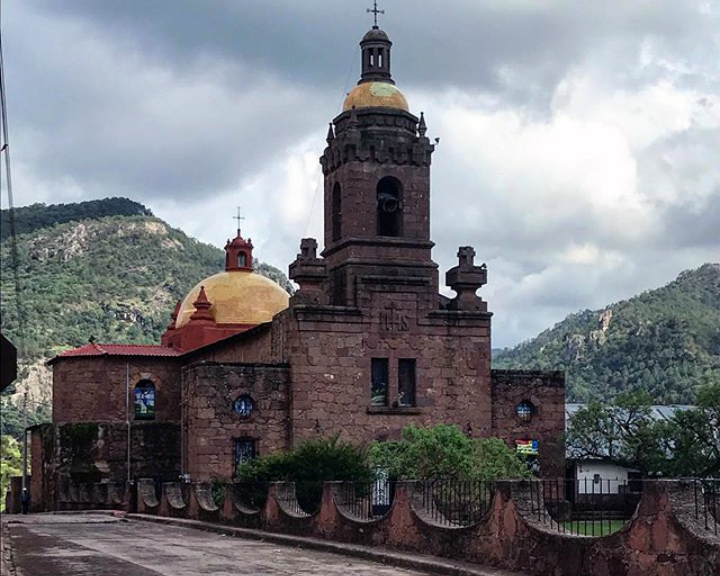
- Church in Cerocahui

- Location within Chihuahua Location within Mexico
- Coordinates: 27°17′52″N 108°03′19″W
- Country: Mexico
- State: Chihuahua
- Municipality: Urique Municipality

Population
  - Total: 1,167

Cerocahui is a town in the Urique Municipality of Chihuahua, Mexico.

== History ==
Cerocahui was founded by a Jesuit missionary in 1680.

It is well known for its local Jesuit church. In June 2022 gunmen invaded the church after a local man tried to seek refuge inside the building. The assailants murdered a civilian man as well as two Jesuit priests.

== Railway station ==
Cerocahui is also the site of a Ferrocarril Chihuahua al Pacífico station.

Current services
Preceding station	Ferromex	Following station
Témoris toward Los Mochis	Chepe Regional	Cuiteco toward Chihuahua
El Fuerte toward Los Mochis	Chepe Express	Divisadero toward Creel-Sierra Tarahumara
Former services
Preceding station	N de M	Following station
Parajes toward Topolobampo	Ferrocarril Chihuahua al Pacífico	Cuiteco toward Ojinaga
