= El Fuerte, Sinaloa =

City in the Mexican state of Sinaloa

El Fuerte
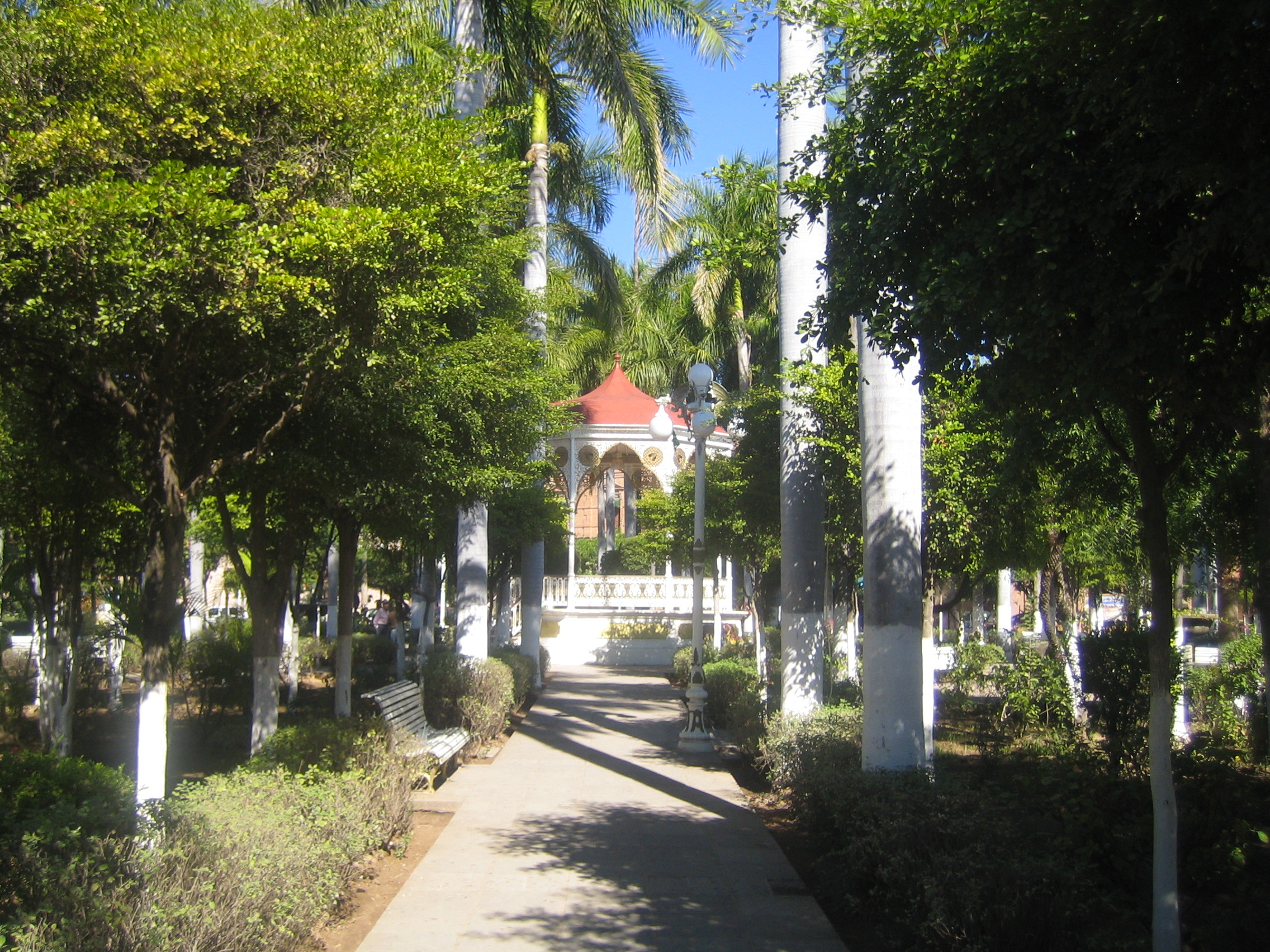
- Constitution Square gazebo
- Interactive map of El Fuerte
- Location in Mexico Location in Sinaloa
- Coordinates: 26°25′17″N 108°37′12″W
- Country: Mexico
- State: Sinaloa
- Municipality: El Fuerte
- Elevation: 90 m (300 ft)

Population (2010)
  - Total: 12,566
- Time zone: UTC-7 (Mountain Standard Time)
- Website: Government page

El Fuerte (Spanish: [el ˈfweɾte]) is a city and El Fuerte Municipality its surrounding municipality in the northwestern Mexican state of Sinaloa. The city population reported in the 2010 census was 12,566 people.

El Fuerte, meaning "The Fort", was accorded Pueblo Mágico ("Magical Town") designation in 2009, due to its many attractions, its historical importance and its appealing small-town colonial aura.

== History ==
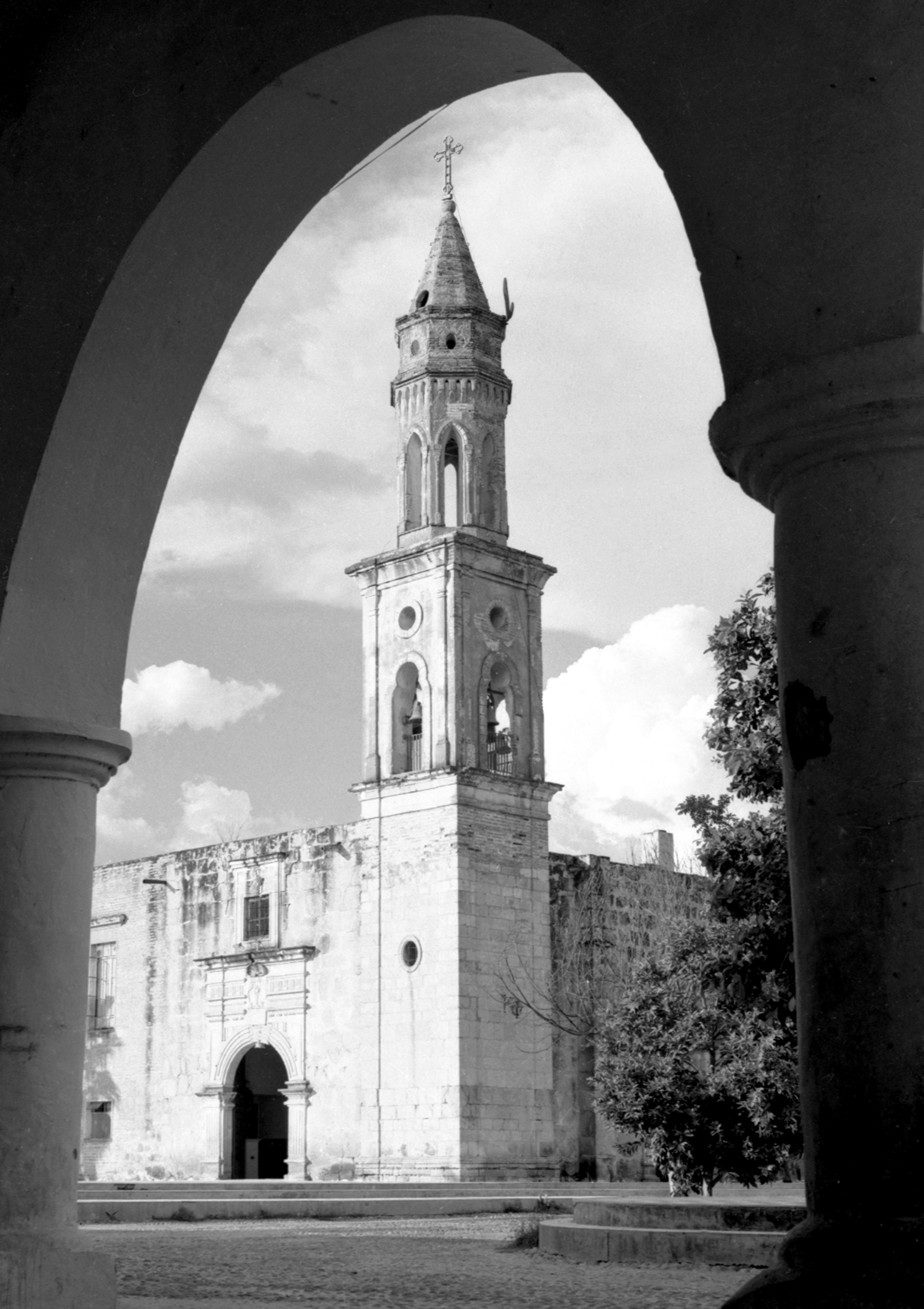
Church of Sacred Heart of Jesus

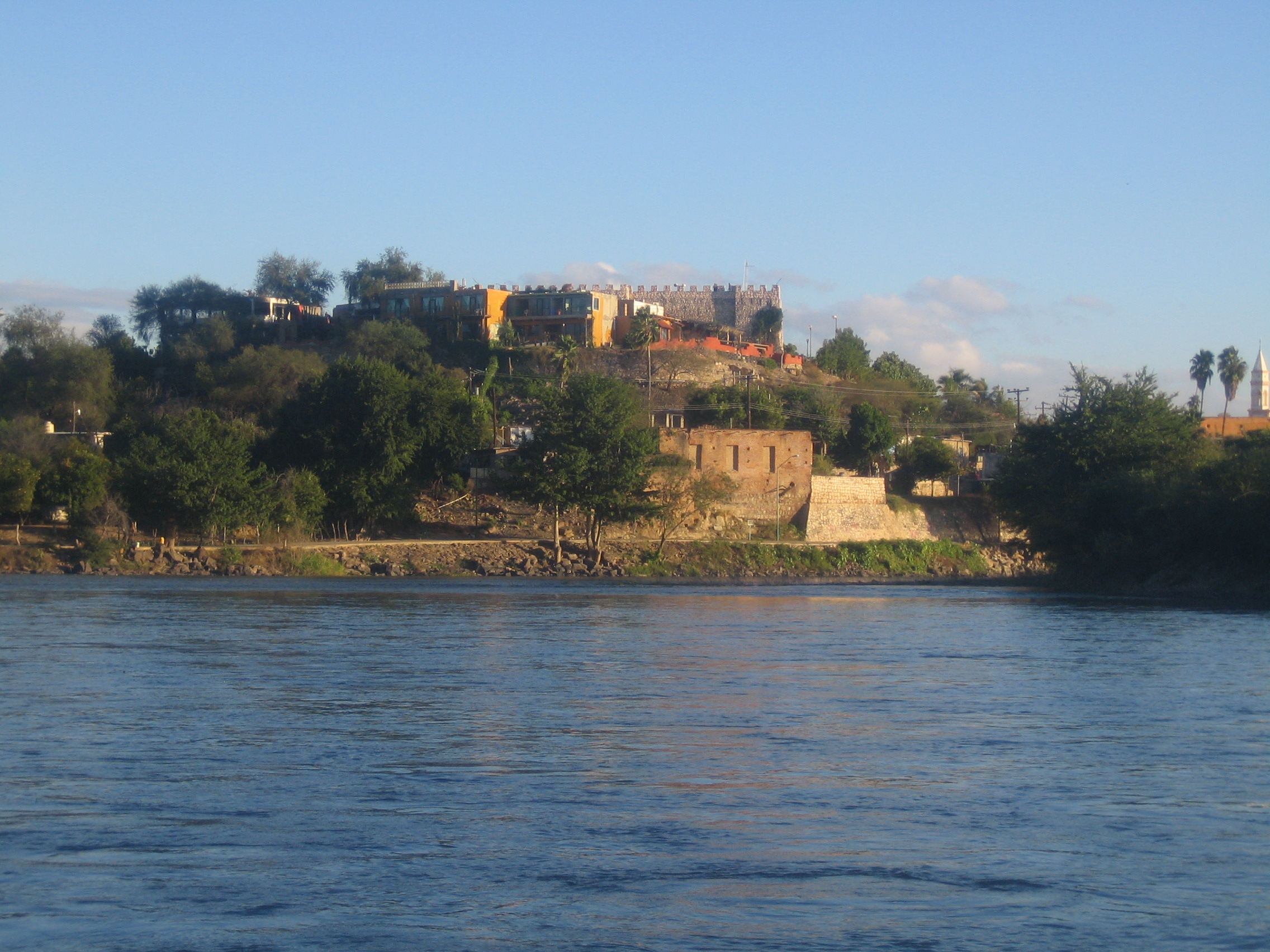
Spanish era fort

The city was founded in 1563 by the Spanish conquistador Francisco de Ibarra, the first European explorer of the lofty Sierra Madre Occidental mountains. In 1610 a fort was built to ward off the fierce Zuaque and Tehueco Native Americans, who constantly harassed the Spaniards. For years, El Fuerte served as the gateway to the vast frontiers of the northern territories of Sonora, Arizona and California, all of which were sparsely populated by unyielding tribes of native amerindians.

For nearly three centuries it was the most important commercial and agricultural center of the vast northwestern region of Mexico. El Fuerte was a chief trading post for silver miners and gold seekers from the Urique and Batopilas mines in the nearby mountains of the Sierra Madre Occidental and its branches.

In 1824, El Fuerte became the capital city of the newly created Mexican state of Sonora y Sinaloa (reaching up deep into modern-day Arizona). It remained the capital for several years until the split of this state into the states of Sinaloa and Sonora.

== Tourism ==
Tourism remains a major industry in town, although it has been diminished in recent years by tourists being wary of Mexican drug cartel violence in other parts of Sinaloa; however, violence declined by 2013 from a high in 2011. El Fuerte has several holidays and local "Fiestas" which are celebrated with pageants, "Ferias" and the like. Several hotels cater to hunters and fishermen, who hunt (deer, boar, wild hog, wild goat, rabbit, armadillo, a variety of snakes) in the foothills or fish in the nearby Rio Fuerte river which runs on the northwest part of the town's commercial district. There are also local petroglyphs a short distance from the downtown. The city also serves as a gateway to the popular Barrancas del Cobre (Copper Canyon) situated in the nearby state of Chihuahua. There are no easily travelled roads to Copper Canyon from west of the Sierra Madre Occidental.

== Transportation ==
=== Passenger train ===
Many visitors take the Ferrocarril Chihuahua al Pacífico railway, whose local station is a few miles south of town. The route is on the Chihuahua-Pacific Railroad, or ChePe, which passes through the scenic Copper Canyon, from Chihuahua, Chihuahua to the northeast, to Los Mochis, Sinaloa, near the Gulf of California, to the southwest.

Preceding station	Ferromex	Following station
Sufragio toward Los Mochis	Chepe Regional	Loreto toward Chihuahua
Los Mochis Terminus	Chepe Express	Bahuichivo-Cerocahui toward Creel-Sierra Tarahumara
Former services
Preceding station	N de M	Following station
Norotes toward Topolobampo	Ferrocarril Chihuahua al Pacífico	Ing. Heriberto Valdez toward Ojinaga

=== Aviation ===
The town is also served by El Fuerte Airport.

== Geography ==
=== Climate ===
Climate data for El Fuerte (1951–2010)
Month	Jan	Feb	Mar	Apr	May	Jun	Jul	Aug	Sep	Oct	Nov	Dec	Year
Record high °C (°F)	38.5 (101.3)	39.5 (103.1)	42.0 (107.6)	44.0 (111.2)	46.0 (114.8)	45.5 (113.9)	45.5 (113.9)	46.0 (114.8)	44.5 (112.1)	44.0 (111.2)	42.0 (107.6)	39.0 (102.2)	46.0 (114.8)
Mean daily maximum °C (°F)	27.7 (81.9)	29.2 (84.6)	31.6 (88.9)	34.8 (94.6)	37.8 (100.0)	39.6 (103.3)	37.7 (99.9)	36.5 (97.7)	36.5 (97.7)	35.8 (96.4)	32.0 (89.6)	28.3 (82.9)	34.0 (93.2)
Daily mean °C (°F)	17.6 (63.7)	18.6 (65.5)	20.3 (68.5)	23.2 (73.8)	26.5 (79.7)	30.8 (87.4)	30.9 (87.6)	30.0 (86.0)	29.6 (85.3)	26.9 (80.4)	21.8 (71.2)	18.2 (64.8)	24.5 (76.1)
Mean daily minimum °C (°F)	7.5 (45.5)	8.0 (46.4)	9.0 (48.2)	11.6 (52.9)	15.2 (59.4)	21.9 (71.4)	24.1 (75.4)	23.5 (74.3)	22.8 (73.0)	18.1 (64.6)	11.5 (52.7)	8.1 (46.6)	15.1 (59.2)
Record low °C (°F)	−3.5 (25.7)	−4.5 (23.9)	−0.5 (31.1)	2.0 (35.6)	6.0 (42.8)	10.5 (50.9)	13.0 (55.4)	10.0 (50.0)	15.0 (59.0)	8.0 (46.4)	−1.0 (30.2)	−5.0 (23.0)	−5.0 (23.0)
Average precipitation mm (inches)	28.2 (1.11)	14.7 (0.58)	6.7 (0.26)	2.8 (0.11)	2.6 (0.10)	33.0 (1.30)	169.5 (6.67)	176.2 (6.94)	103.6 (4.08)	32.3 (1.27)	17.8 (0.70)	26.6 (1.05)	614.0 (24.17)
Average precipitation days (≥ 0.1 mm)	2.8	1.9	0.9	0.6	0.4	3.0	13.7	12.9	7.5	2.9	1.7	2.8	51.1
Source: Servicio Meteorologico Nacional

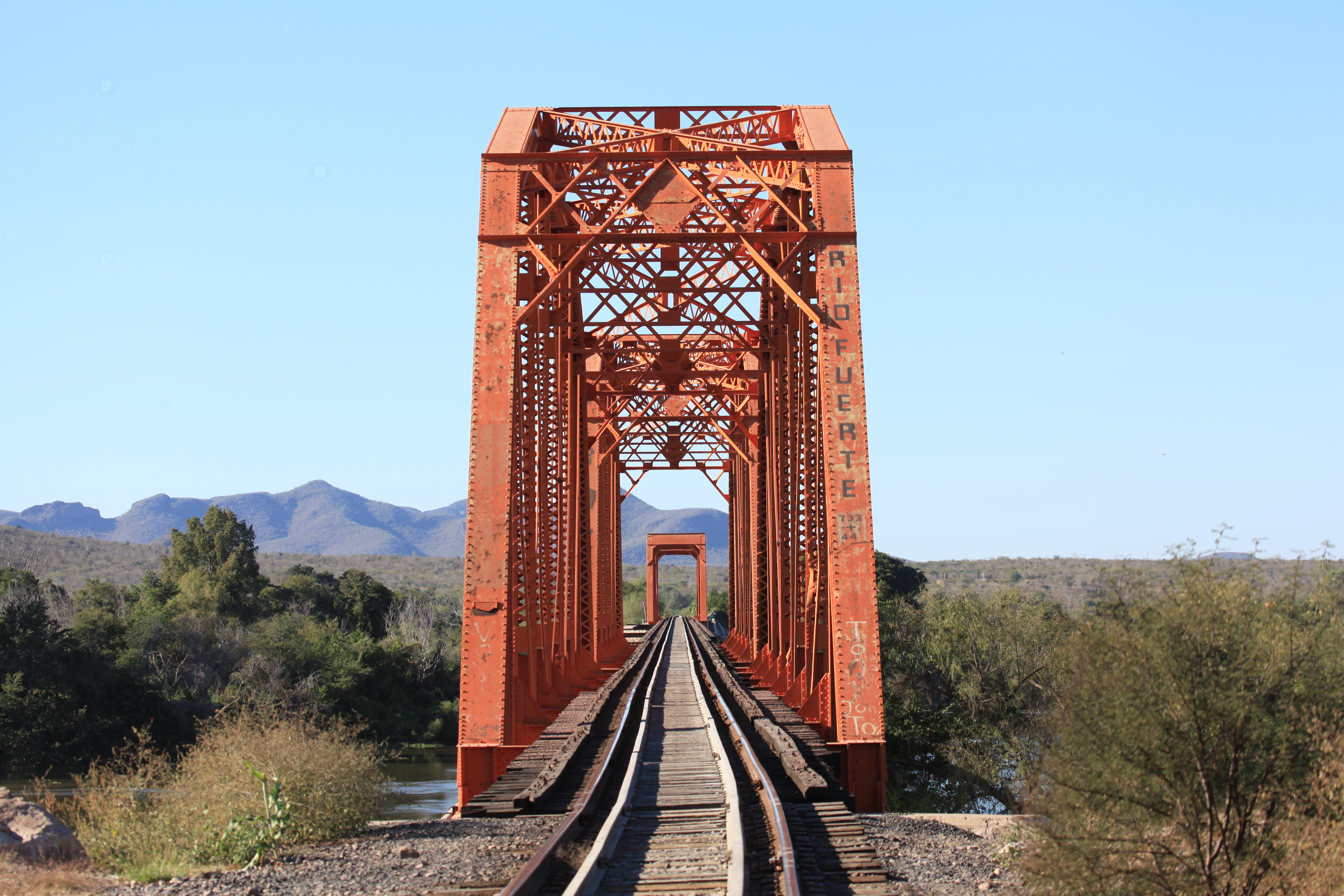
Railway across El Fuerte

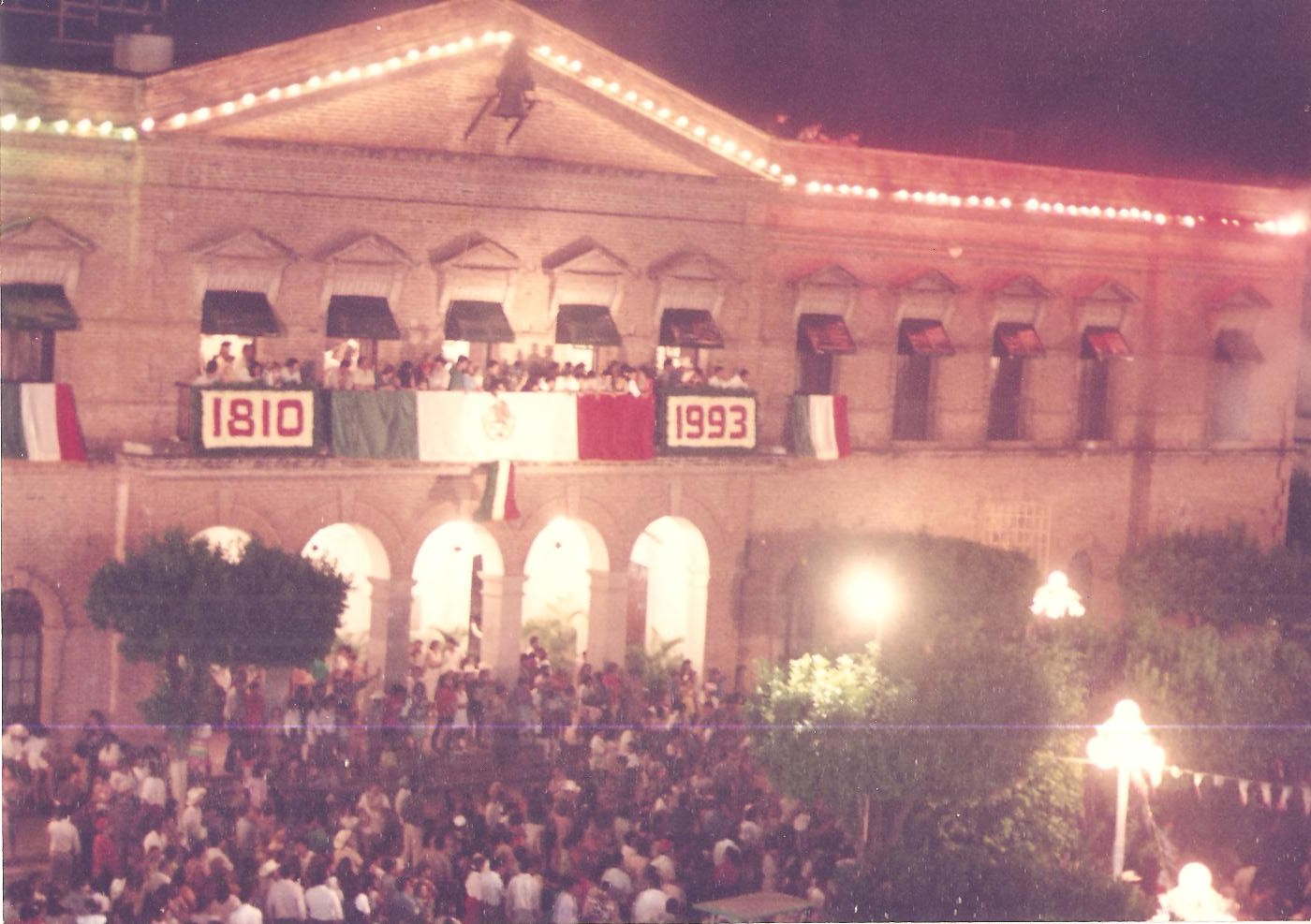
City Hall during El Grito

== Notable people ==
- Gabriel Lugo (1946–2017), professional baseball player

== Sister cities ==
- Southlake, Texas, United States
