= Namurachi =

- village
- Location in Mexico
- Coordinates: 27°22′26″N 107°53′6″W
- Country: Mexico
- State: Chihuahua
- Municipality: Urique
- Elevation: 2,022 m (6,634 ft)

Population (2010)
  - Total: 4

Namurachi is a rural community located in Urique Municipality, Chihuahua, Mexico. It had a population of 4 inhabitants at the 2010 census, and is situated at an elevation of 2,022 meters above sea level.
