= El Fuerte Airport =

Airfield in El Fuerte, Sinaloa, Mexico

El Fuerte Airfield Aeródromo de El Fuerte
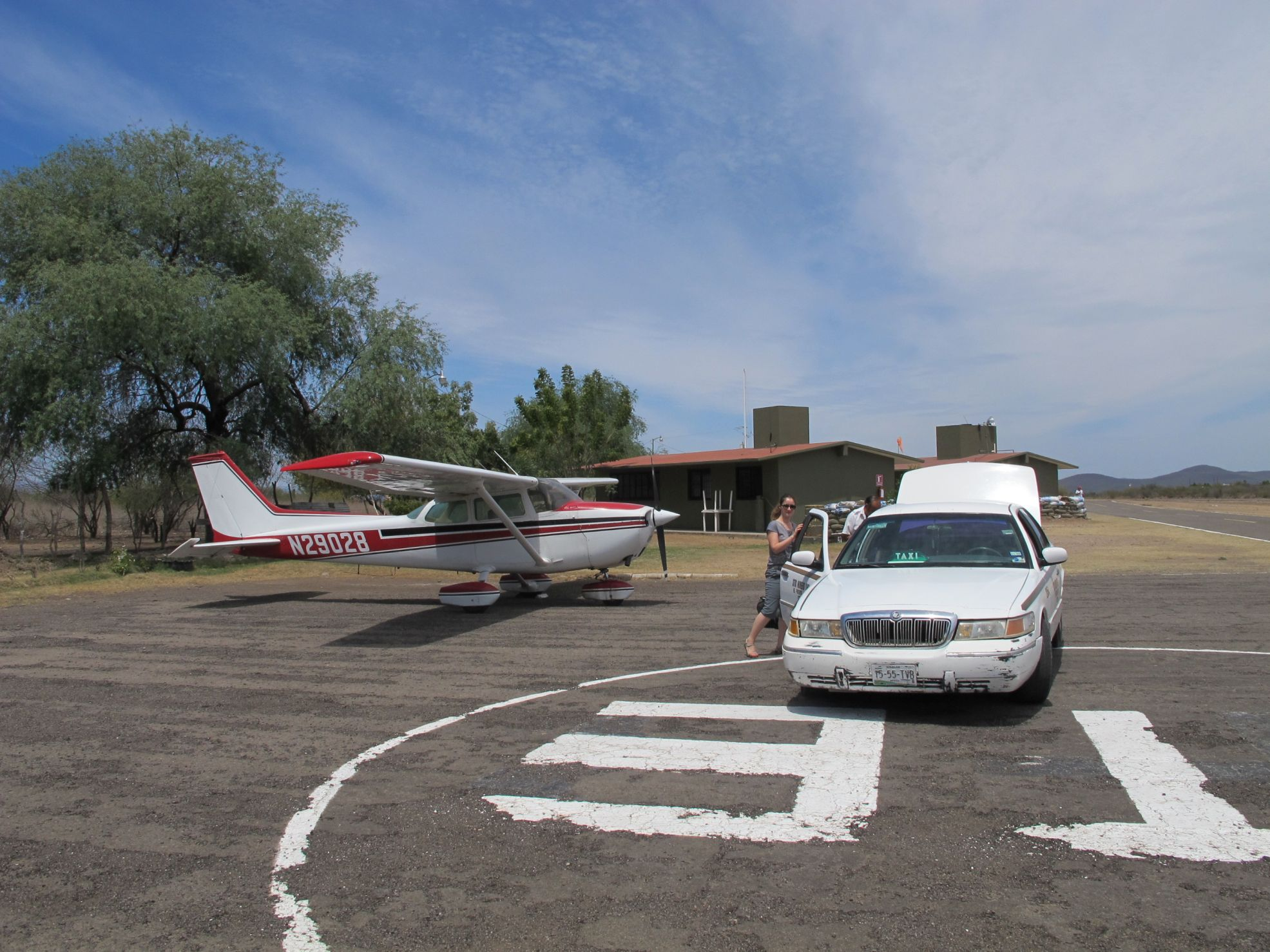
- IATA: none; ICAO: MM79; LID: FTE

Summary
- Airport type: Public
- Serves: El Fuerte, Sinaloa, Mexico
- Time zone: MST (UTC−07:00)
- Elevation AMSL: 97 m / 318 ft
- Coordinates: 26°23′53″N 108°36′41″W

Map
- Location of the airport in Sinaloa MM79 (Mexico)

Runways
Direction	Length		Surface
Direction	m	ft	Surface
14/32	1,463	4,800	Asphalt

Statistics (2023)
- Total passengers: N/A

El Fuerte Airfield (Spanish: Aeródromo de El Fuerte) (ICAO: MM79) is a small airfield located in El Fuerte, Sinaloa, Mexico. It handles domestic air traffic and supports flight training and general aviation activities. The airfield does not provide scheduled passenger public services. The nearest airport that serves commercial flights is Los Mochis International Airport.

Situated at an elevation of 97 metres (318 ft) above mean sea level, it features a single asphalt runway, designated as 14/32, measuring 1,463 by 20 metres (4,800 by 66 ft). Adjacent facilities include an apron with parking positions for aircraft, and a small terminal building. It underwent renovations in 2019.

== See also ==
- List of the busiest airports in Mexico
- List of airports in Mexico
- List of airports by ICAO code: M
- List of busiest airports in North America
- List of the busiest airports in Latin America
- Transportation in Mexico
- Tourism in Mexico
- Los Mochis International Airport
