= Ferrocarril Chihuahua al Pacífico =

Train service between Chihuahua City, Chihuahua and Los Mochis, Sinaloa

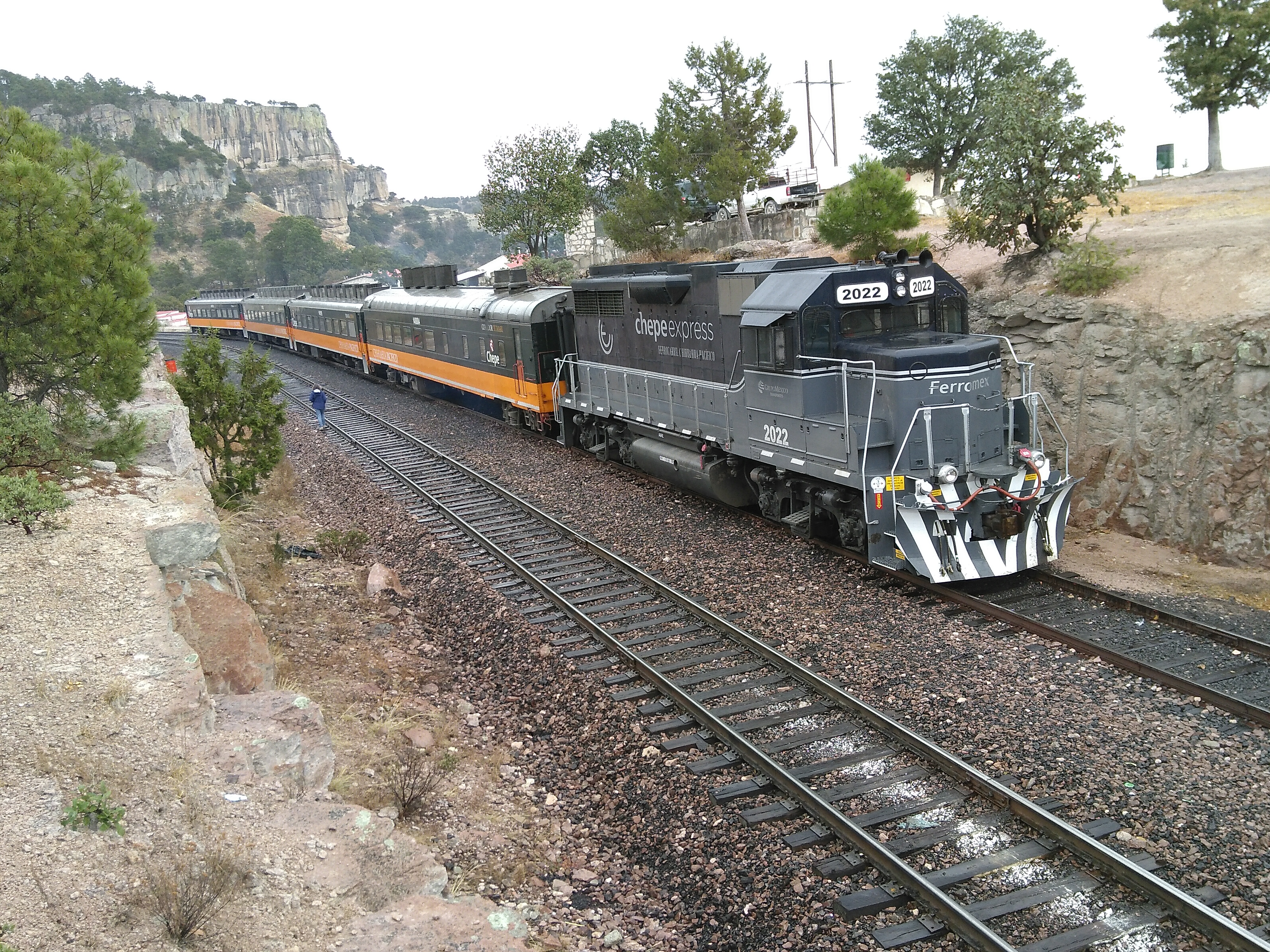
- The Chepe Express Train

Overview
- Service type: Inter-city rail; Tourist train
- Locale: Northwestern Mexico
- Predecessor: Kansas City, Mexico and Orient Railway
- First service: November 22, 1961
- Current operator: Ferromex
- Former operator: Ferrocarriles Nacionales de México
- Website: Chepe Express

Route
- Termini: Chihuahua; Los Mochis
- Stops: 20
- Distance travelled: 668 kilometres (415 mi)
- Line used: Q Line

Technical
- Rolling stock: Locomotives primarily EMD GP38-2 and SD40-2. Coaches are primarily Kinki Sharyo (Japan) Generations 1 through 3.
- Track gauge: 1,435 mm (4 ft 8 1/2 in) standard gauge

The Ferrocarril Chihuahua al Pacífico (reporting mark CHP), commonly known as ChePe, is a passenger train operated by Ferromex in northwestern Mexico between city of Chihuahua and Los Mochis, crosses the Sierra Madre Occidental mountain range.

Stretching approximately 673 km (418 mi), the railway traverses the scenic Copper Canyon region and is widely regarded as one of the most spectacular rail journeys in North America. The route includes 37 bridges and 86 tunnels, reaching elevations of about 2,400 m (7,900 ft) above sea level near Divisadero (the continental divide), a popular lookout spot over the canyons. The service functions both as an important transportation link for local communities and as a major tourist attraction.

== History ==
The concept of the railroad was officially recognized in 1880, when the president of Mexico, General Manuel González, granted a rail concession to Albert Kinsey Owen of the Utopia Socialist Colony of New Harmony, Indiana, United States, who was seeking to develop a socialist colony in Mexico. The railroad was actually built by Arthur Stilwell as the Kansas City, Mexico and Orient Railway, starting about 1900.

From 1910 to 1914, Mexico North Western Railway (sp. Ferrocarril del Noroeste) completed the Temosachic–Casas–Grandes line. Kansas City, Mexico and Orient Railway completed the Chihuahua–Ojinaga section. Enrique Creel's Chihuahua al Pacífico railroad completed the Chihuahua–Creel section.

In 1940, Mexico acquired the rights from Kansas City, Mexico and Orient Railway. In May 1952, Mexico took possession of a line operated by Mexican Northwestern Railway. In 1955, Mexico merged them as Ferrocarril Chihuahua al Pacifico, S.A. de C.V. Financial difficulties caused by the cost of building a railroad through rugged terrain delayed the project, and the ChP was not completed until 1961.

The private rail franchise Ferromex took over the railroad from the Mexican government in 1998.

== Services ==
In general, two different passenger trains run daily:

Service	Terminals	Details
Chepe Express	Between Los Mochis and Creel	A direct service for tourists, which is faster and more expensive
Chepe Regional	Between Los Mochis and Chihuahua	A slower service with more stops for locals, with 16 stops at which boardings or disembarkations can be made at passenger request, and the other a luxury

== Travel classes ==
The ChePe offers the following travel classes:

Service	Details
First Class	Urike restaurant (domed dining car); Exclusive access to the bar – terrace (with lounge areas and stools); 96 reclining ergonomic seats with central tables; Snack and beverage; Bar with a panoramic view; On-board service; HD screens; Premium audio system; Luxury restrooms; Panoramic windows
Executive Class	Access to its own restaurant; 240 reclining seats; Bar with a panoramic view; Snack and beverage service; HD screens; HD screens; Premium audio system; Luxury restrooms; Panoramic windows
Tourist Class	Access to the restaurant; 256 seats; Snack and beverage service; On-board service; Restrooms; Windows; Meals not included

== Gallery ==
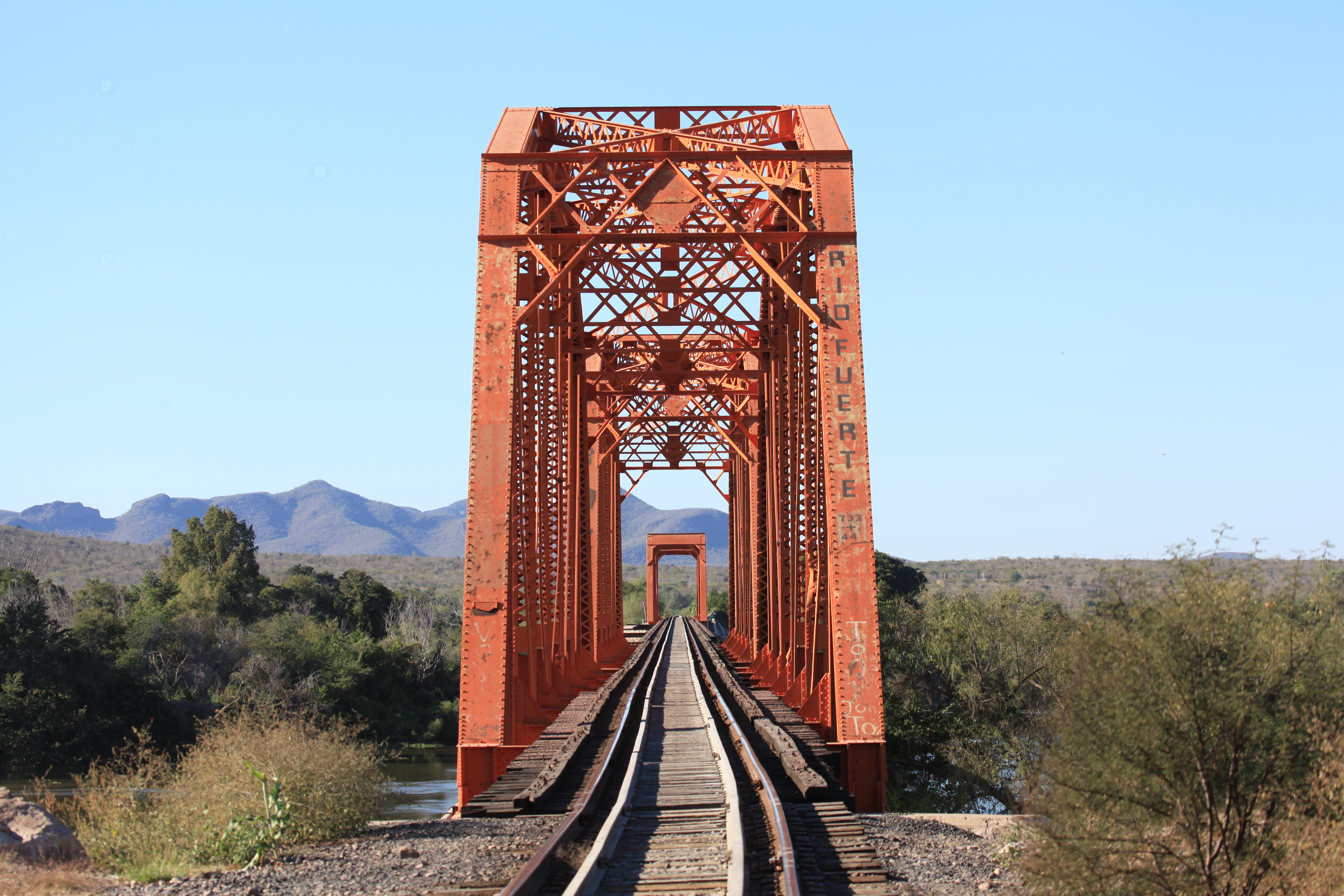
Bridge across the Río Fuerte at El Fuerte

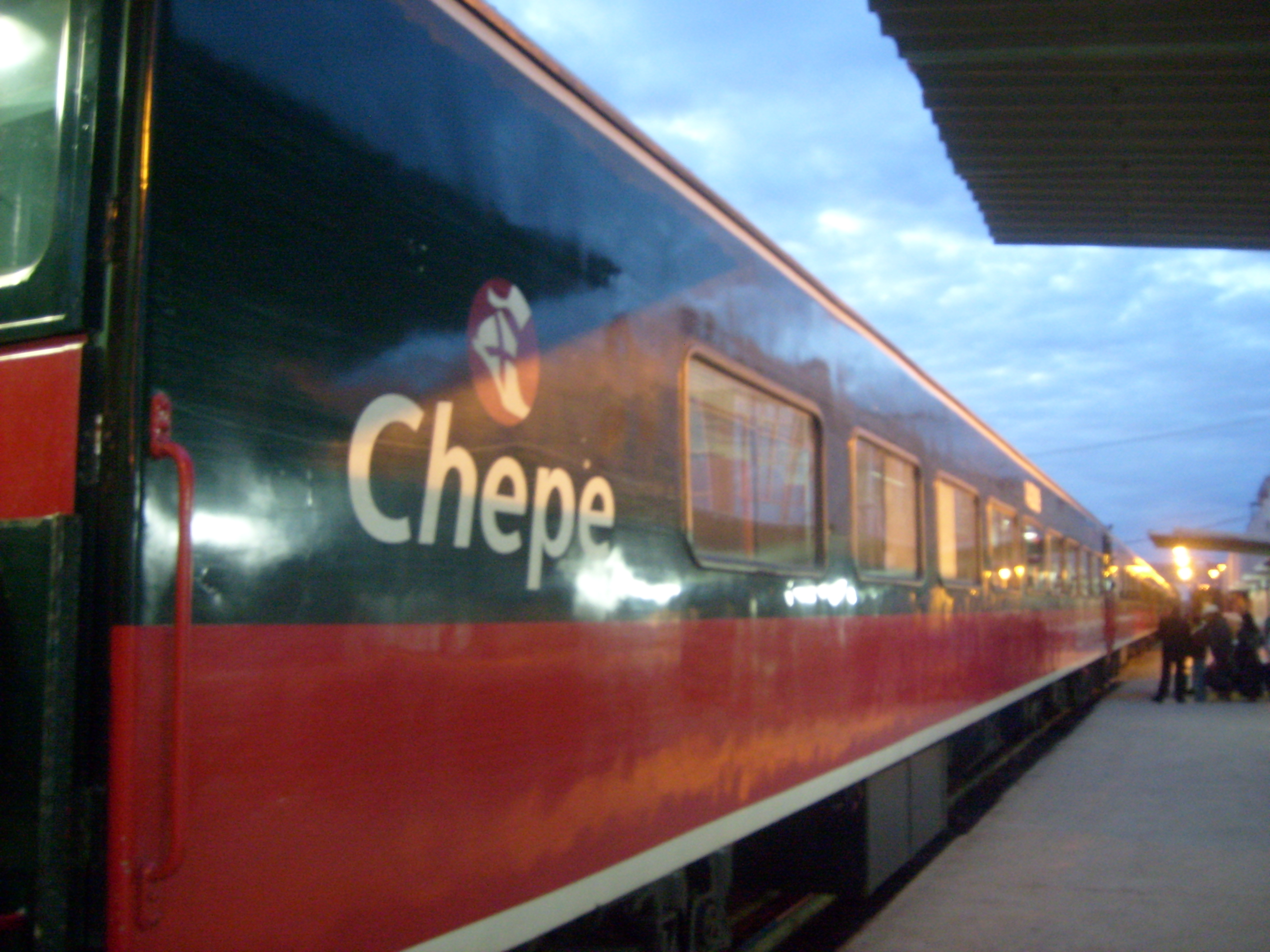
El Chepe at terminal station, 8 February 2009

== See also ==
- La Entrada al Pacífico
- List of Mexican railroads
- List of named passenger trains of Mexico
