= Urique Municipality =

Municipality in the Mexican state of Chihuahua

Urique
- Municipality
- Municipality of Urique in Chihuahua

- Location in Mexico
- Coordinates: 27°3′15″N 106°15′58″W
- Country: Mexico
- State: Chihuahua
- Municipal seat: Urique

Area
  - Total: 3,968.6 km^{2} (1,532.3 sq mi)

Population (2010)
  - Total: 20,386
  - Density: 5.1368/km^{2} (13.304/sq mi)

Urique is one of the 67 municipalities of Chihuahua, in northern Mexico. The municipal seat lies at Urique. The municipality covers an area of 3,968.6 km^{2}.

As of 2010, the municipality had a total population of 20,386, up from 19,567 as of 2005.

As of 2010, the town of Urique had a population of 1,102. Other than the town of Urique, the municipality had 1,214 localities, the largest of which (with 2010 populations in parentheses) were: San Rafael (2,160), Cerocahui (1,556), and Bahuichivo (1,502), classified as rural.

== Geography ==
=== Towns and villages ===
The municipality has 857 localities. The largest are:

Name	Population (2005)
San Rafael	2,168
Bahuichivo	1,365 Bahuichivo
Cerocahui	1,304
Urique	984
Total Municipality	19,566
