= Los Mochis =

City in the Mexican state of Sinaloa

- City and municipal seat
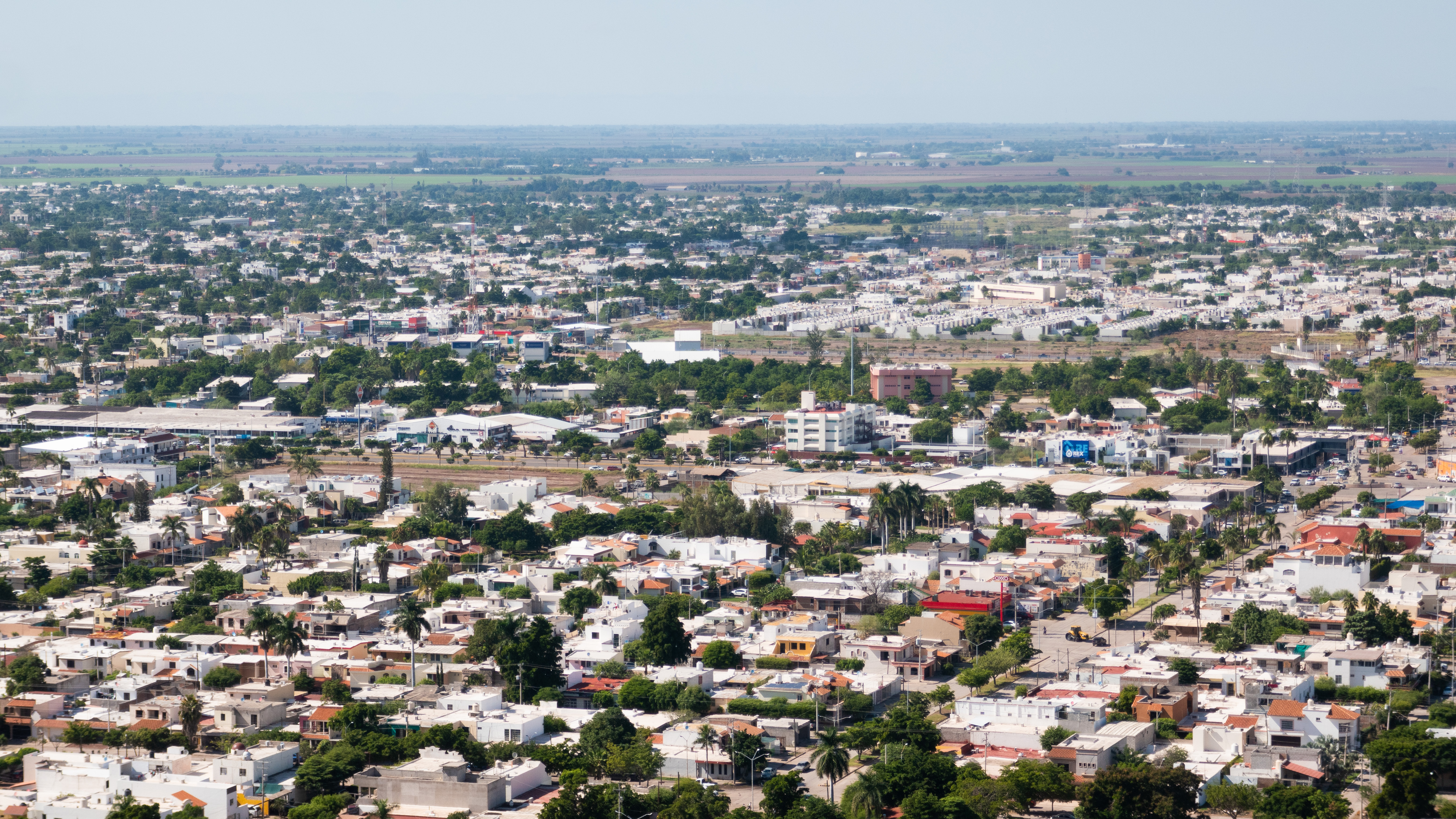
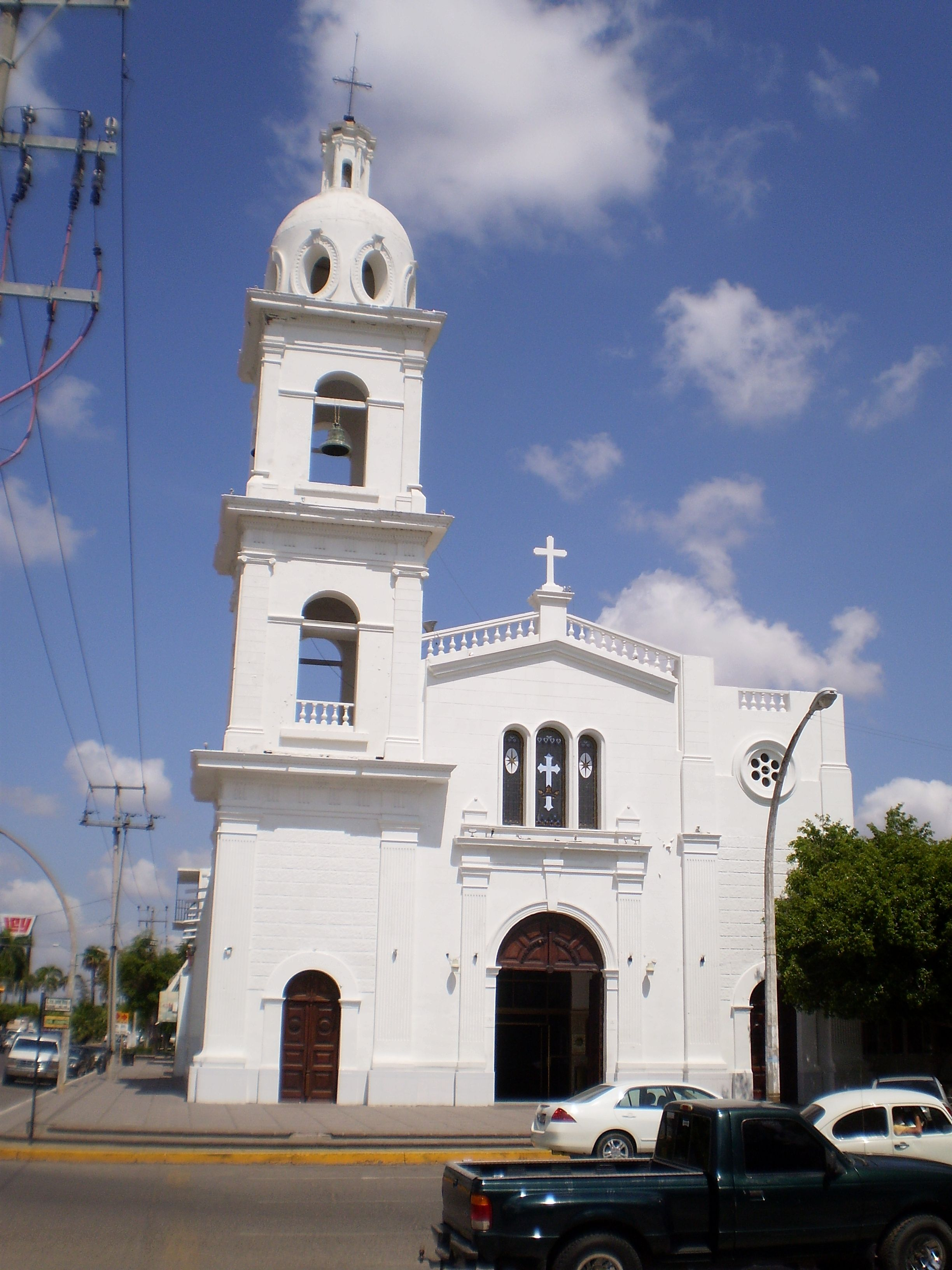
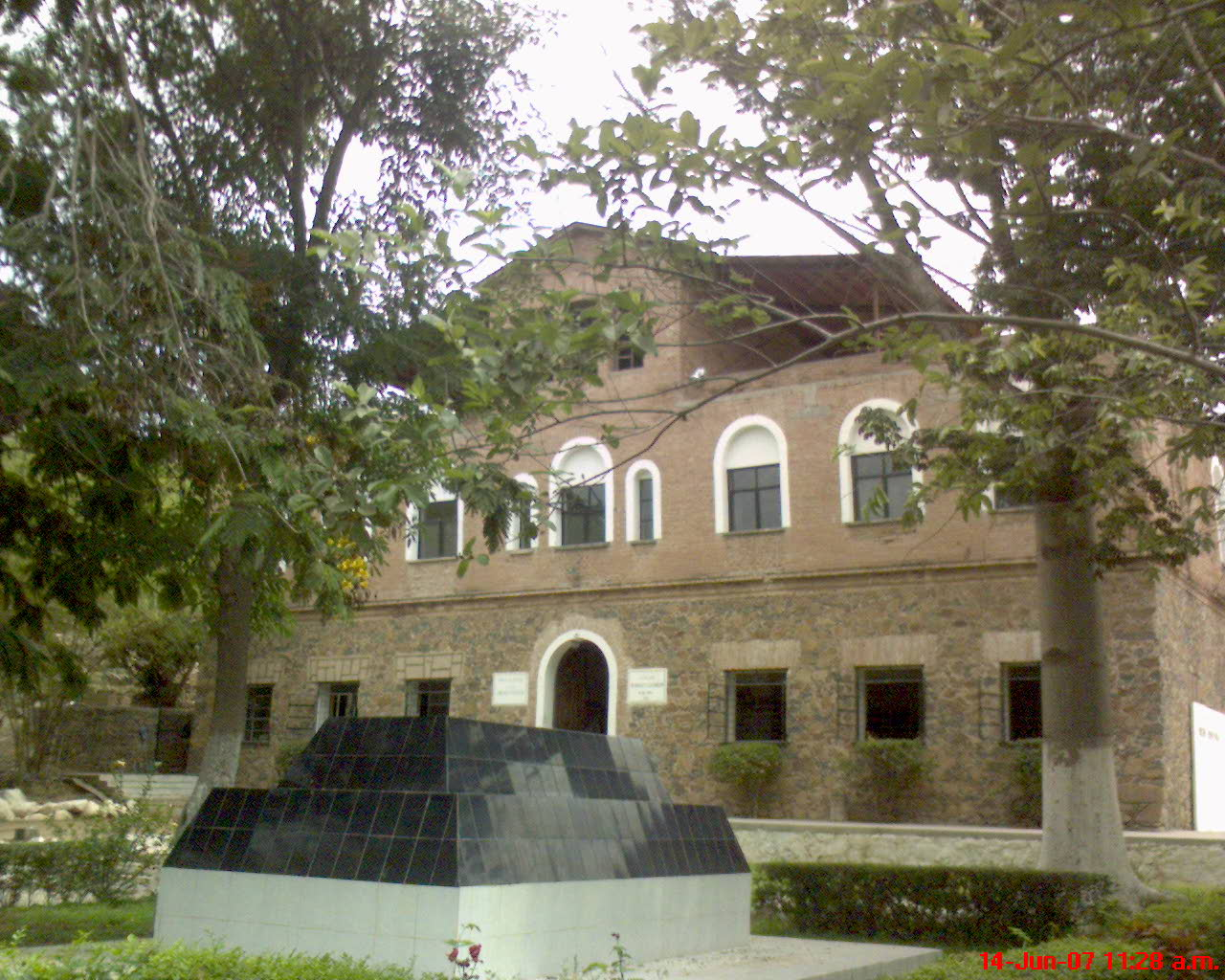
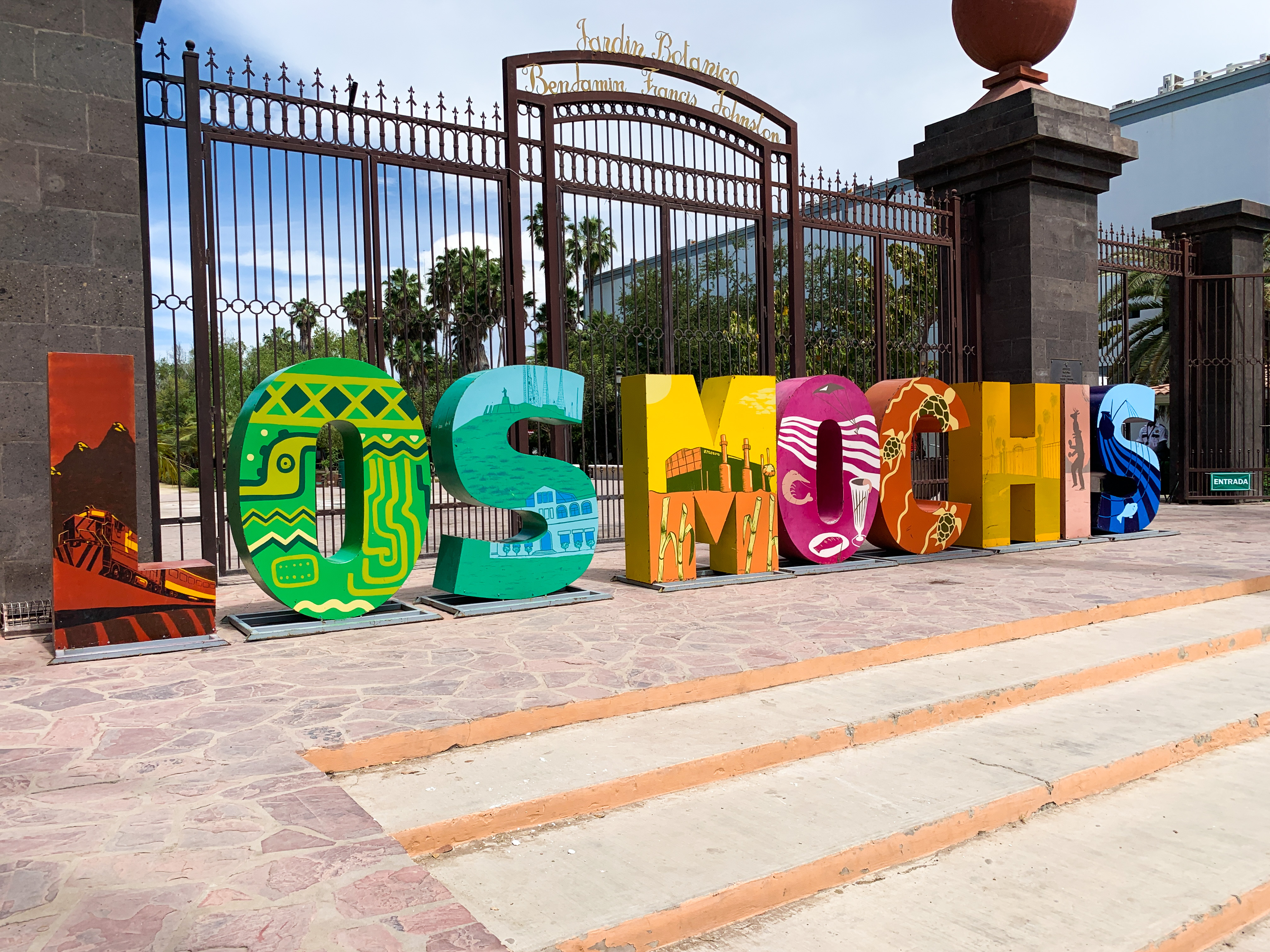
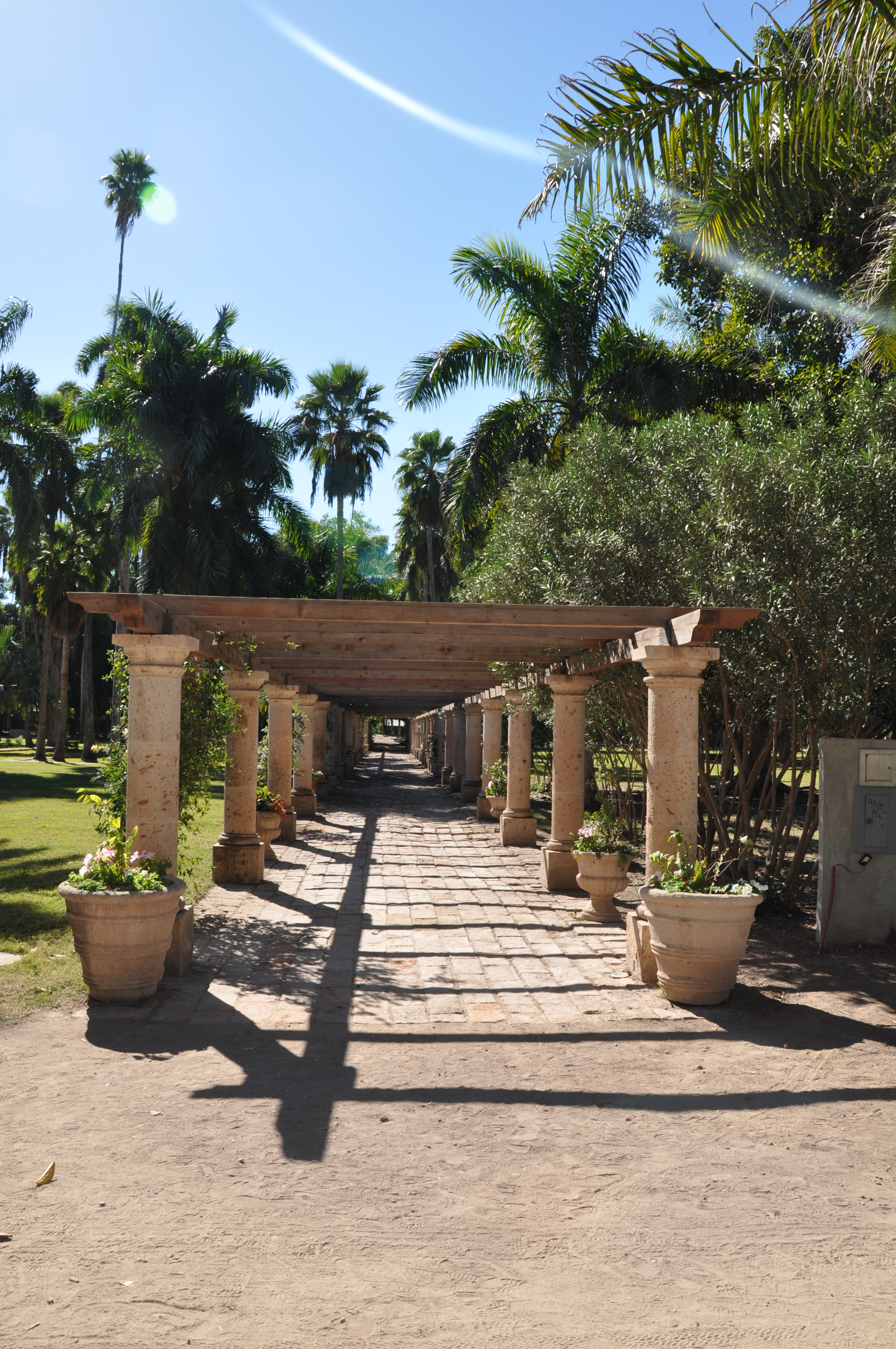
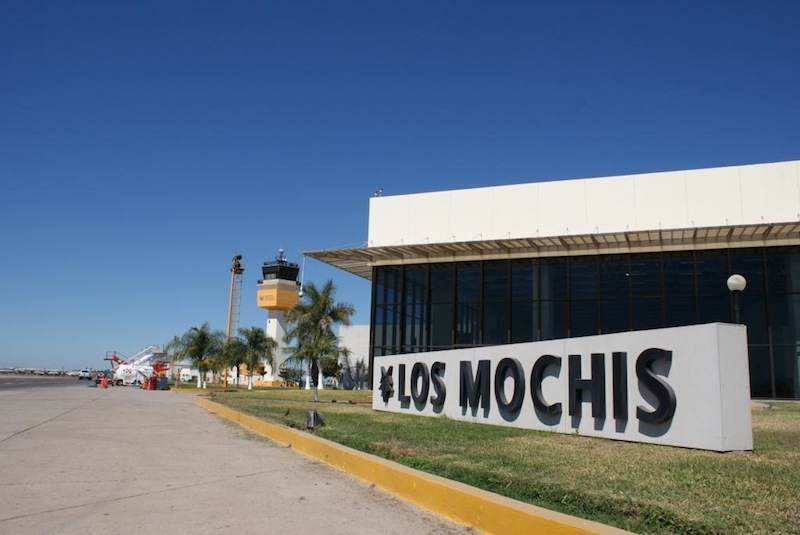
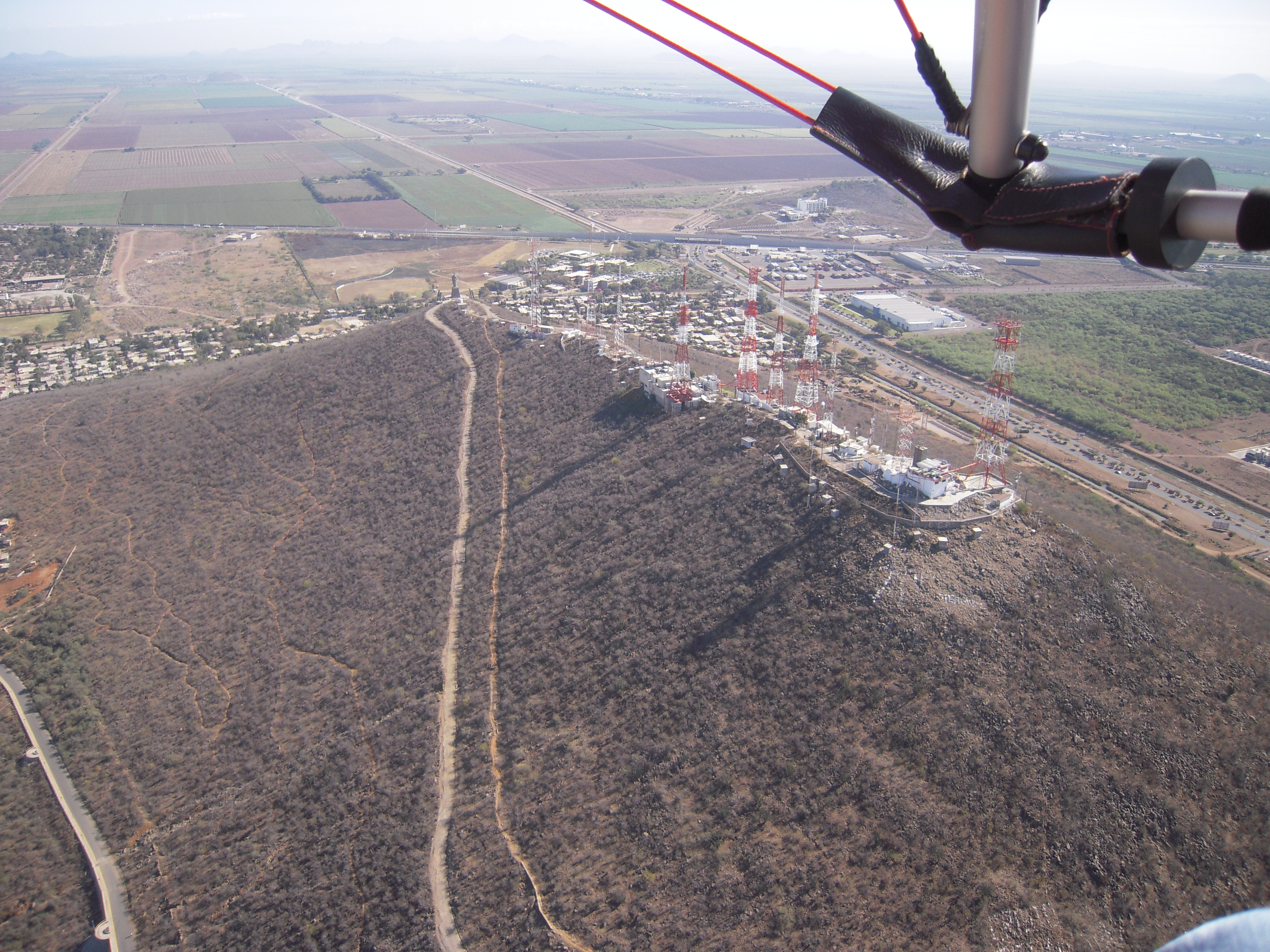
- Northern Suburbs Church of the Sacred Heart of Jesus House of Conrado Espinoza Los Mochis letters Sinaloa Park Los Mochis International Airport Cerro de La Memoria
- Interactive map of Los Mochis
- Location in Mexico Los Mochis (Mexico)
- Coordinates: 25°47′0.59″N 108°59′37.47″W
- Country: Mexico
- State: Sinaloa
- Municipality: Ahome
- Founded in: 1893
- Elevation: 10 m (33 ft)

Population (2010)
  - Total: 256,613 (Note: 124,228 males and 132,385 females)

Metro area GDP (PPP, constant 2015 values)
  - Year: 2023
  - Total: $7.3 billion
  - Per capita: $21,900
- Time zone: UTC–07:00 (Zona Pacífico)
- Postal code: 81200 to
- Area code: +52 668

Los Mochis (Spanish pronunciation: [los ˈmotʃis]) is a coastal city in northern Sinaloa, Mexico. It serves as the municipal seat of the municipality of Ahome. As of the 2010 census, the population was 362,613, which was 61 percent of the municipality's population.

Los Mochis is the western terminus of the Chihuahua-Pacific Railroad (El Chepe), which passes through the scenic Copper Canyon. This railway was approved by President Porfirio Díaz as a trade route linking the cattle markets in Kansas City with the nearest port on the Pacific Ocean, Topolobampo.

Today the North Pacific irrigation region (Sinaloa-Sonora) is the principal agricultural area of Sinaloa, containing over 70% of all irrigated land and producing sugar cane, cotton, rice, flowers, and many types of vegetables. The valley is one of the largest producers of mangoes in Mexico. Air transportation is provided by Los Mochis Airport. Nearby Topolobampo is the second largest natural deepwater port in the world, and is known for its commercial fishing and increasingly important role in shipping.

== History ==
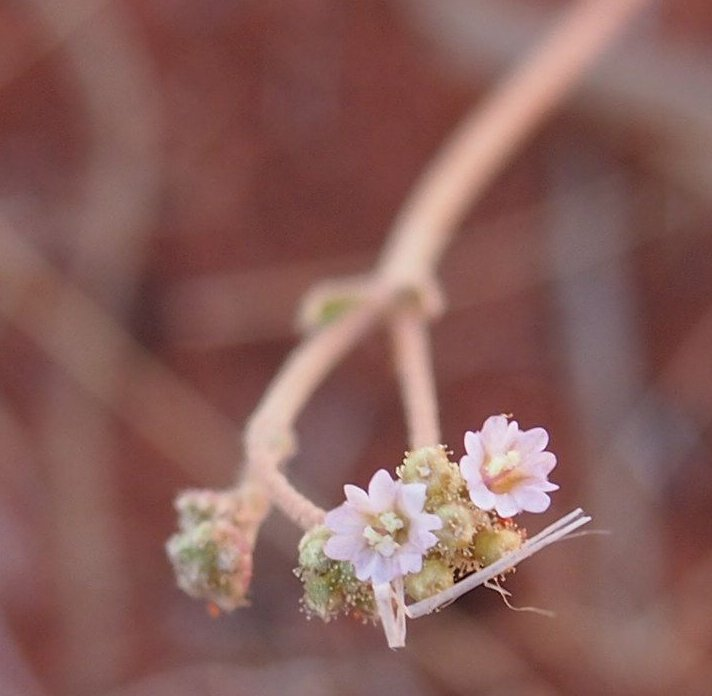
Mochi (Boerhavia coccinea) plant for which Los Mochis was named

The indigenous peoples of this location include Yoreme (Mayo), Cahita, and Guasaves/Tamazulas. The name Los Mochis comes from mochim, the plural of mochic, the Cahitan word for "earth turtle". The noun is used to refer to the flowers of Boerhavia coccinea.

Initial development began in 1893 by a group of American utopian socialists who were adherents of Albert Kimsey Owen, an American civil engineer who built the first irrigation ditches in the valley. The Topolobampo colony survived for 31 years. Owen, who came to do studies for the construction of a railway, was enchanted by Ohuira Bay and imagined the city of the future, where railways and shipping lines converged to ship throughout the world. The port of Topolobampo continues to be developed and may realize Owen's dream.

The city was founded by a businessman named Benjamin F. Johnston, who came to make a fortune in the cultivation of sugarcane. Johnston arrived at Topolobampo, attracted by Owen's city project. He saw an opportunity to exploit resources such as sugar cane. With Edward Lycan, who had been linked to Zacarías Ochoa, owner of a trapiche (raw sugar mill) named "El Águila", Johnston initiated the construction of a sugar mill. In 1898, Johnston laid its first stone and drove the rapid growth of the city around it. The first harvest was in 1903. Ochoa died suddenly, and Johnston seized businesses that Lycan and Ochoa founded. "El Águila Sugar Refining Company" later became the United Sugar Company.

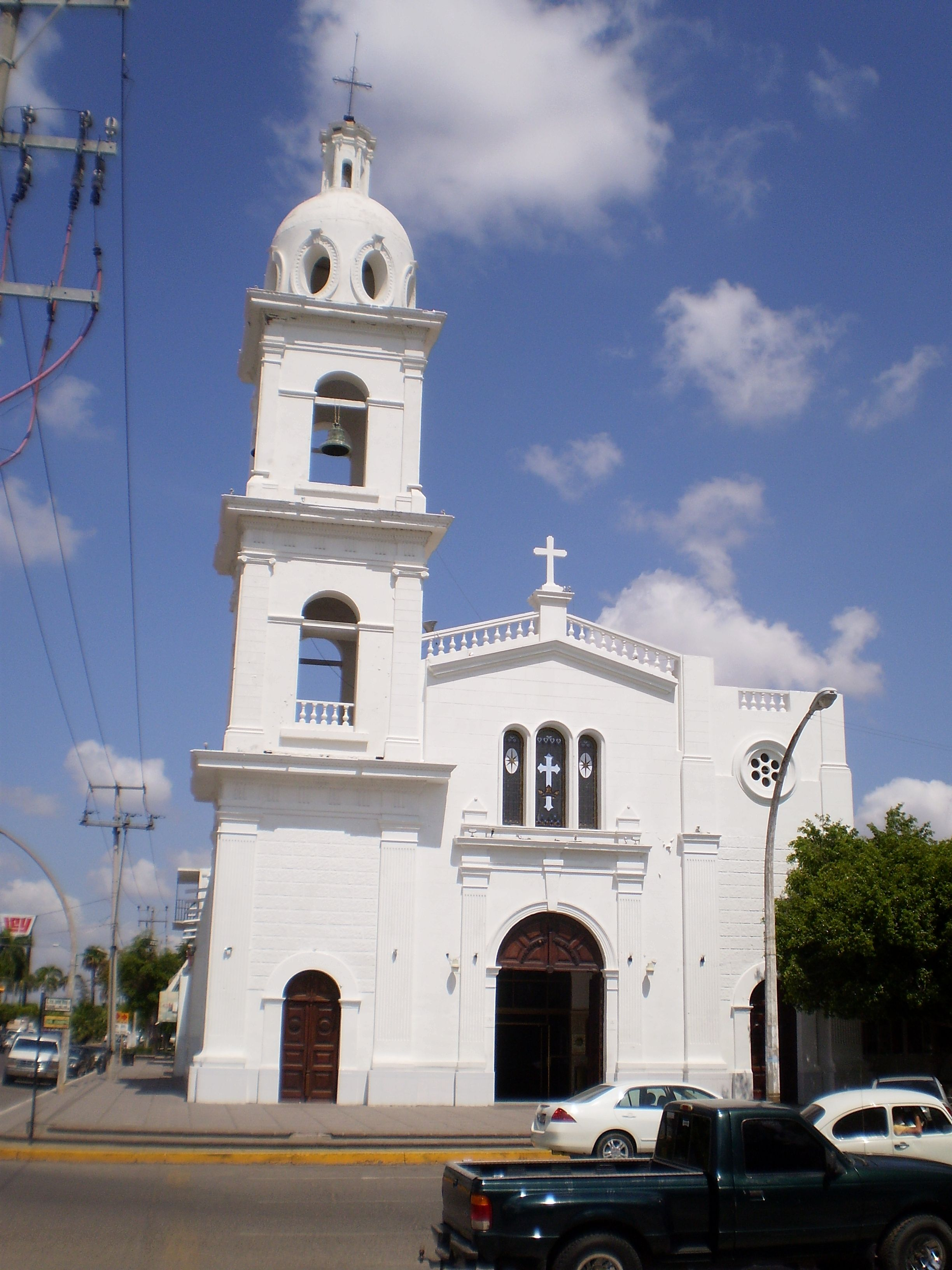
Sacred Heart Church

Johnston was an influential and powerful businessman, who personally drew up the plans for the wide and straight streets of Los Mochis. It was not recognized as a city until 20 April 1903, along with Topolobampo, by decree of mayor Ramon C. López during the governorship of Francisco Cañedo. On 20 December 1917, the town of Ahome was established by decree of the local legislature. In 1918, Florencio A. Valdés was the first elected mayor of Los Mochis. On 1 April 1935, the Ahome City Council declared Los Mochis the seat of government of Ahome, city councillor Modesto G. Castro noting that Los Mochis was already several times more populous. The decision was ratified by the state legislature on 10 May 1936. The transfer took place promptly and without major problems, and municipal offices were installed in a house owned by Don Fco. Beltran, at the corner of Hidalgo and Zaragoza next to the former union hall.

Los Mochis is currently the commercial center of Valle del Fuerte and its influence extends from the municipalities of El Fuerte, Choix, and Guasave in southern Sinaloa to the state of Sonora to the north. The economic development of the city that began with the sugar industry is now based on the high-tech agriculture practiced throughout northwestern Mexico.

== Geography ==
=== Climate ===
Los Mochis has a hot arid climate (Köppen BWh) despite averaging 330 millimetres or 13 inches of rain annually. Summers are extremely hot, reaching 40 °C (104 °F) with overnight lows of 26 °C (78.8 °F) with high humidity make the nights uncomfortable, and a heat index reaching 45 °C (113 °F) in the day. Winters are very warm, reaching 30 °C (86 °F) in the day, even though the lowest temperature recorded was 2.5 °C (36.5 °F) during January 1971. Rainfall concentrates in the summer: it is common to see thunderstorms and even occasional hurricanes in August and September, but winters are dry with almost no rainfall, though on 29 December 1978 133.4 millimetres (5.25 in) fell. The highest daily rainfall, however, totaled 211 millimetres (8.31 in) from a hurricane that hit the area on 8 October 1985.

Climate data for Los Mochis (1951–2010)
| Month | Jan | Feb | Mar | Apr | May | Jun | Jul | Aug | Sep | Oct | Nov | Dec | Year |
|---|---|---|---|---|---|---|---|---|---|---|---|---|---|
| Record high °C (°F) | 36.0 (96.8) | 38.5 (101.3) | 40.0 (104.0) | 40.0 (104.0) | 43.0 (109.4) | 44.0 (111.2) | 45.0 (113.0) | 47.5 (117.5) | 48.0 (118.4) | 43.0 (109.4) | 40.0 (104.0) | 36.0 (96.8) | 48.0 (118.4) |
| Mean daily maximum °C (°F) | 26.1 (79.0) | 27.7 (81.9) | 29.7 (85.5) | 32.5 (90.5) | 35.2 (95.4) | 37.1 (98.8) | 37.6 (99.7) | 37.5 (99.5) | 36.7 (98.1) | 35.2 (95.4) | 30.7 (87.3) | 26.5 (79.7) | 32.7 (90.9) |
| Daily mean °C (°F) | 18.9 (66.0) | 19.9 (67.8) | 21.5 (70.7) | 24.0 (75.2) | 26.8 (80.2) | 30.1 (86.2) | 31.5 (88.7) | 31.3 (88.3) | 30.7 (87.3) | 28.4 (83.1) | 23.4 (74.1) | 19.5 (67.1) | 25.5 (77.9) |
| Mean daily minimum °C (°F) | 11.7 (53.1) | 12.1 (53.8) | 13.3 (55.9) | 15.5 (59.9) | 18.4 (65.1) | 23.1 (73.6) | 25.4 (77.7) | 25.2 (77.4) | 24.7 (76.5) | 21.6 (70.9) | 16.1 (61.0) | 12.6 (54.7) | 18.3 (64.9) |
| Record low °C (°F) | 2.5 (36.5) | 4.5 (40.1) | 6.0 (42.8) | 9.0 (48.2) | 11.0 (51.8) | 13.0 (55.4) | 20.0 (68.0) | 19.5 (67.1) | 13.0 (55.4) | 12.0 (53.6) | 7.0 (44.6) | 4.0 (39.2) | 2.5 (36.5) |
| Average rainfall mm (inches) | 14.7 (0.58) | 8.0 (0.31) | 3.1 (0.12) | 0.5 (0.02) | 0.8 (0.03) | 6.3 (0.25) | 48.2 (1.90) | 87.5 (3.44) | 92.4 (3.64) | 33.4 (1.31) | 17.8 (0.70) | 18.8 (0.74) | 331.5 (13.05) |
| Average rainy days (≥ 0.1 mm) | 2.0 | 1.4 | 0.5 | 0.3 | 0.2 | 0.8 | 6.4 | 8.6 | 5.8 | 2.5 | 1.4 | 2.0 | 31.9 |
Source: Servicio Meteorológico Nacional

== Sports ==
Los Mochis is known for its sports culture and large, high-quality sporting facilities (Ciudades Deportivas) intended to promote participation in sports. It has two large sporting facilities that have running tracks, pools, tennis courts, baseball fields and a football stadium with a capacity of 11,000.

The city is home to the Mexican Pacific League's Cañeros de Los Mochis baseball club. The city's football team is called the Murciélagos de Los Mochis, and its basketball team is known as the Pioneros.

Professional boxing is popular in Los Mochis.

== Transportation ==
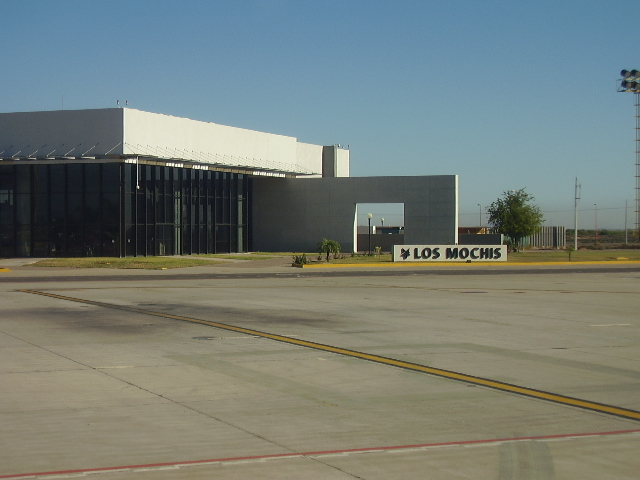
Los Mochis Airport

The Ferrocarril Chihuahua al Pacífico provides daily passenger service to Chihuahua, Chihuahua in north-central Mexico. Freight service on this route is provided by the interstate rail conglomerate Ferromex, or Ferrocarril de Mexicano, which also links to the port city of Topolobampo.

| Preceding station | Ferromex | Following station |
|---|---|---|
| Terminus | Chepe Regional | Sufragio toward Chihuahua |
| Terminus | Chepe Express | El Fuerte toward Creel-Sierra Tarahumara |
Former services
| Preceding station | N de M | Following station |
| Topolobampo Terminus | Ferrocarril Chihuahua al Pacífico | Constancia toward Ojinaga |

The city is on Mexican Federal Highway 15, the main north-south route from Nogales to Mexico City.

The city's airport offer domestic flights, mainly to Mexico's largest cities and is served by several airlines.

== Notable people ==
- Jorge "Travieso" Arce, first Mexican to win World Championships in four weight divisions and former WBO Super Bantamweight Champion.
- Francisco Arce Armenta, boxer, title contender in the Featherweight division.
- Sergio Arias, footballer for C.D. Chivas USA and World Champion with the Mexican U-17 National team.
- Luis Ayala, former baseball professional pitcher that played for numerous teams in the National and American Leagues.
- Miguel Beltrán Jr., boxer, title contender in the Lightweight division.
- Edwin Borboa, footballer for the Potros Neza.
- Omar Bravo, footballer for Club Deportivo Guadalajara and the Mexico national team.
- Juan Castro, shortstop for a number of teams in MLB.
- Hugo Cázares, two weight division World Champion boxer and current WBA Super Flyweight Champion.
- Daniel Cota, boxer, title contender in the Heavyweight division.
- Jorge Cota, Light Middleweight boxer with a record of 28-3.
- Antonio DeMarco, boxer, former WBC Lightweight Champion.
- Carlos Fierro, footballer for the Chivas de Guadalajara. Winner of the 2011 FIFA U-17 World Cup
- Denisse Guerrero, lead singer of the Mexican electropop band Belanova.
- Laura Harring, Mexican actress and former Miss USA (1985).
- Teddy Higuera, former pitcher for Milwaukee Brewers in Major League Baseball.
- Joel Huiqui, footballer for the Monarcas Morelia and the Mexico national team.
- Enrique Jackson, politician and candidate for the PRI presidential primaries.
- Roberto Jordan, 1960s singer
- Francisco Labastida, former PRI candidate to the 2000 Mexican presidential election.
- Rosalva Luna Ruiz, Nuestra Belleza México 2003.
- Mahonri Montes, professional boxer with a record of 36-9-1.
- Fernando "Cochulito" Montiel, boxer, five-time three weight division world champion.
- Andrés Muñoz, pitcher for the Seattle Mariners and 2024 MLB All-Star.
- Javier Orozco, footballer for the Santos Laguna.
- Juan Carlos Sánchez Jr., boxer, title contender in the Super Flyweight division.
- Humberto "Zorrita" Soto, three division World Champion boxer and current WBC Lightweight champion.
- Humberto Soto, undefeated Heavyweight boxer.
- Jesús Soto Karass, boxer, title contender in the Welterweight division.
- José Félix Jr., professional Lightweight boxer with a record of 36-4-1.
- José Luis Soto Karass, boxer in the Light Welterweight division.
- Hugo Ruiz, former WBA bantamweight champion.
- Carlos Urías, boxer, title contender in the Welterweight division.
- Alma López, MFA, artist, lecturer

== Sister cities ==
- Bellflower, California

== See also ==
- Sinaloa Cartel
- Sierra Madre Occidental
