= Urique =

Town in the Mexican state of Chihuahua

- Town
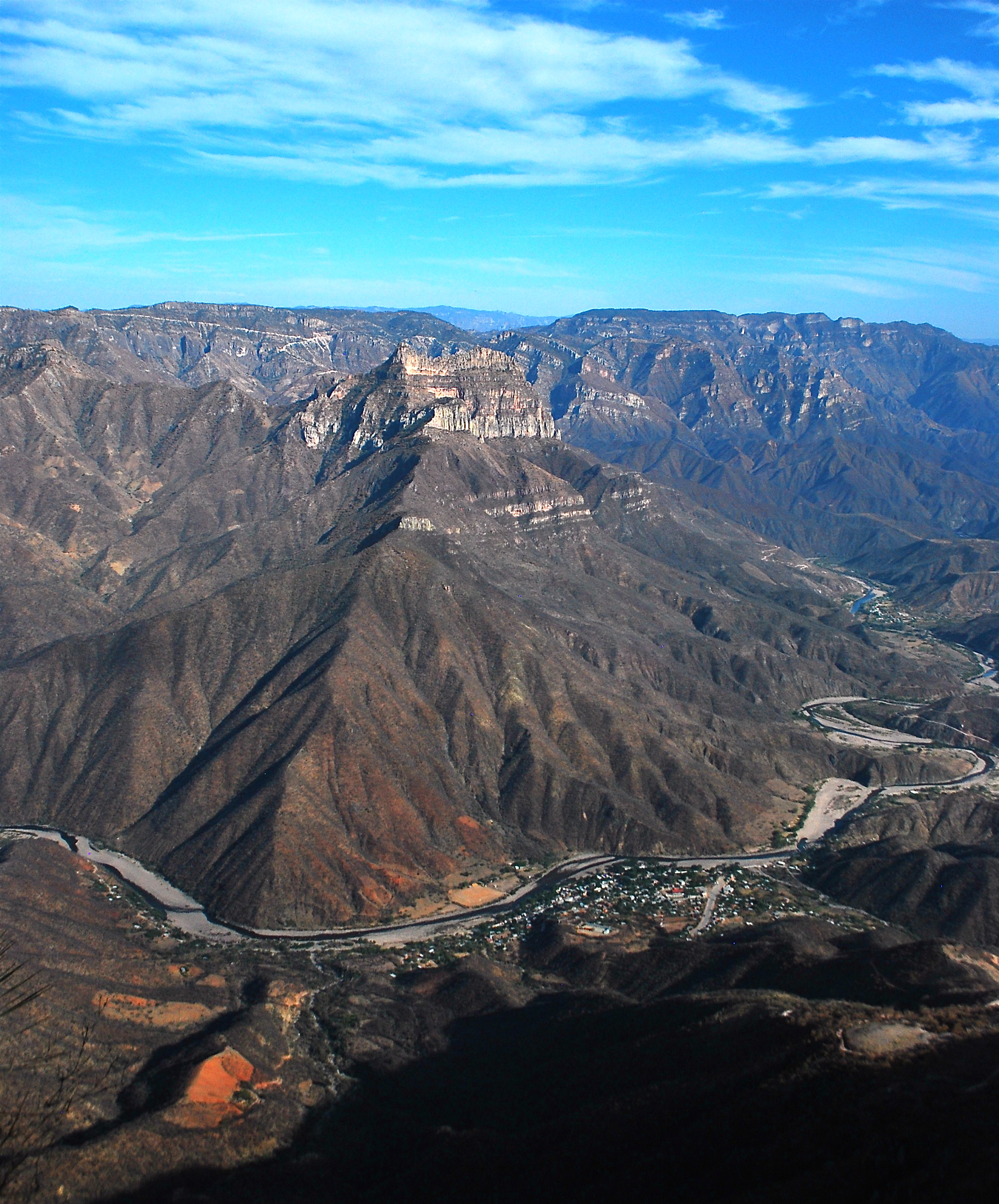
- The town of Urique in the Urique Canyon

- Location in Mexico
- Coordinates: 27°13′0″N 107°55′0″W
- Country: Mexico
- State: Chihuahua
- Municipality: Urique
- Elevation: 550 m (1,800 ft)

Population (2010)
  - Total: 1,102

Urique (Tarahumara: Urike) is a town and seat of the municipality of Urique, in the northern Mexican state of Chihuahua. As of 2010, the town of Urique had a population of 1,102, up from 984 as of 2005. Located in the southwest corner of the state in the region of the cliffs, the town is at the bottom of the valley Barranca de Urique, formed by the river of the same name, due to its relatively low elevation above sea level (about 550 meters) the climate of Urique is close to tropical. It's the principal village of the Municipality of Urique.

== Geography ==
=== Climate ===
Climate data for Urique (1951–2010)
Month	Jan	Feb	Mar	Apr	May	Jun	Jul	Aug	Sep	Oct	Nov	Dec	Year
Record high °C (°F)	38.0 (100.4)	38.0 (100.4)	41.0 (105.8)	43.0 (109.4)	45.5 (113.9)	47.0 (116.6)	46.0 (114.8)	43.0 (109.4)	43.5 (110.3)	43.5 (110.3)	40.0 (104.0)	36.0 (96.8)	47.0 (116.6)
Mean daily maximum °C (°F)	26.5 (79.7)	28.6 (83.5)	31.3 (88.3)	34.9 (94.8)	38.2 (100.8)	39.9 (103.8)	35.4 (95.7)	35.1 (95.2)	35.4 (95.7)	34.5 (94.1)	31.2 (88.2)	27.4 (81.3)	33.2 (91.8)
Daily mean °C (°F)	18.1 (64.6)	19.4 (66.9)	21.7 (71.1)	25.1 (77.2)	28.6 (83.5)	31.2 (88.2)	28.7 (83.7)	28.2 (82.8)	28.0 (82.4)	25.7 (78.3)	22.0 (71.6)	18.8 (65.8)	24.6 (76.3)
Mean daily minimum °C (°F)	9.6 (49.3)	10.1 (50.2)	12.0 (53.6)	15.3 (59.5)	19.1 (66.4)	22.6 (72.7)	21.9 (71.4)	21.4 (70.5)	20.5 (68.9)	16.9 (62.4)	12.8 (55.0)	10.2 (50.4)	16.0 (60.8)
Record low °C (°F)	0.0 (32.0)	1.0 (33.8)	0.5 (32.9)	7.0 (44.6)	11.0 (51.8)	10.5 (50.9)	17.0 (62.6)	17.5 (63.5)	14.0 (57.2)	9.5 (49.1)	5.5 (41.9)	1.5 (34.7)	0.0 (32.0)
Average precipitation mm (inches)	41.2 (1.62)	22.6 (0.89)	15.1 (0.59)	5.7 (0.22)	10.7 (0.42)	79.6 (3.13)	187.7 (7.39)	169.3 (6.67)	115.1 (4.53)	52.1 (2.05)	20.0 (0.79)	50.2 (1.98)	769.3 (30.29)
Average precipitation days (≥ 0.1 mm)	3.9	2.4	1.8	0.9	1.0	7.8	19.1	16.6	10.2	4.0	2.3	3.9	73.9
Source: Servicio Meteorologico Nacional
