= Creel-Sierra Tarahumara railway station =

Railway station in Creel, Chihuahua, Mexico

Coordinates: 27.7546°N 107.6347°W

Creel-Sierra Tarahumara
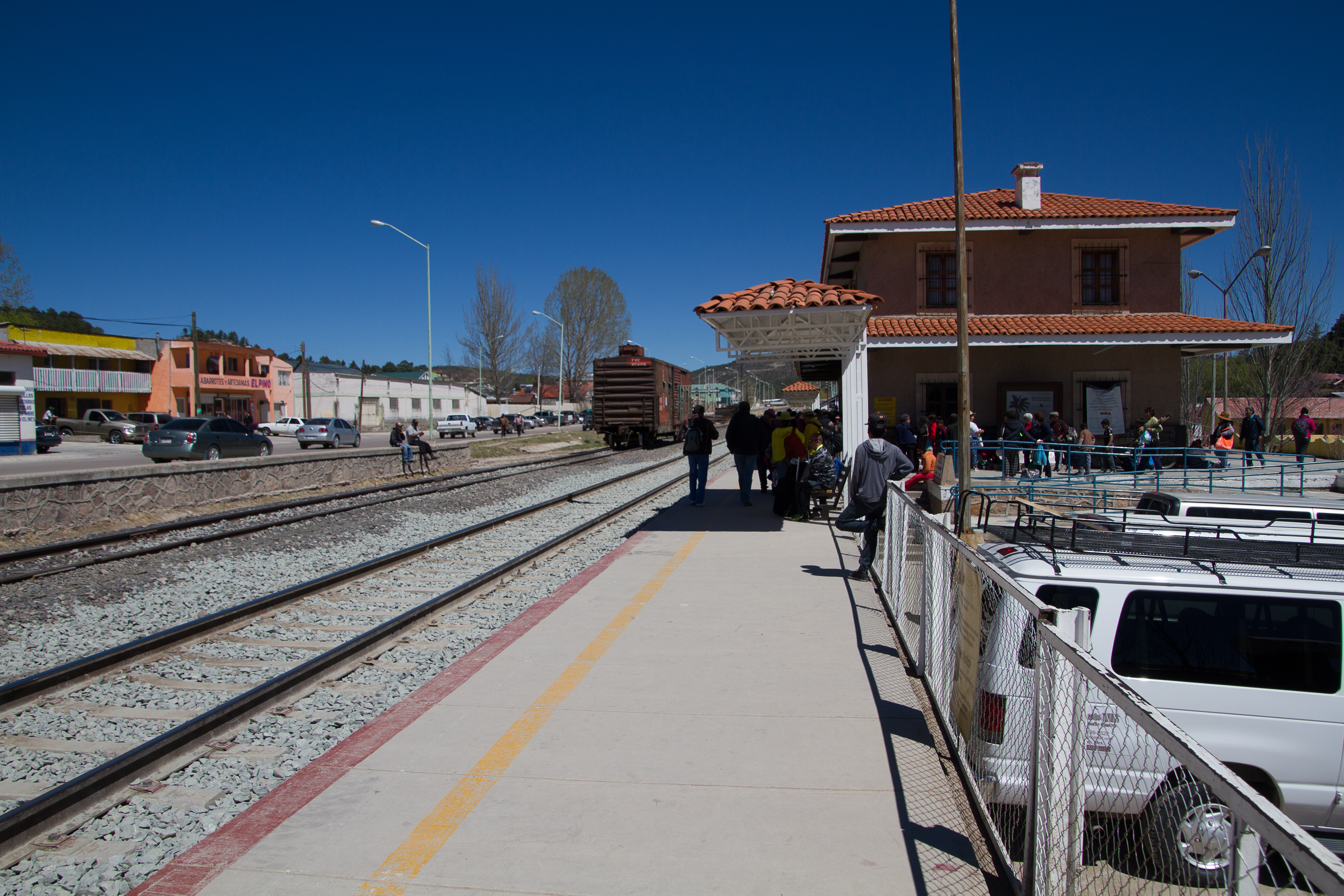

General information
- Location: Creel, Chihuahua; Mexico
- Owner: Grupo México
- Operator: Ferrocarril Chihuahua al Pacífico
- Platforms: 1
- Tracks: 2

Services
Preceding station	Ferromex	Following station
Pitorreal toward Los Mochis	Chepe Regional	San Juanito toward Chihuahua
Divisadero toward Los Mochis	Chepe Express	Terminus
Former services
Preceding station	N de M	Following station
Pitorreal toward Topolobampo	Ferrocarril Chihuahua al Pacífico	Bocoyna toward Ojinaga
Location

Creel-Sierra Tarahumara is a railway station located in Creel, Chihuahua. The station is an important point on El Chepe, because both the Chepe Express and the Chepe Regional serve the station. The station is located at 2240 meters above sea level.

Thanks to its proximity to the Copper Canyon, its number of services dedicated to hospitality, its access roads, valleys and waterfalls, this station is considered the gateway to the Sierra Tarahumara and the Copper Canyon.

== History ==
In 1940, the federal government of Mexico acquired the rights to the Kansas City, Mexico and Orient Railway, and on May 27, 1952, it took possession of the line operated by the Mexico North Western Railway. In 1955, the federal government merged the two lines to form the Ferrocarril Chihuahua al Pacífico. When this was completed in 1961, they connected Ciudad Juárez, Ojinaga and the city of Chihuahua with Topolobampo on the Pacific coast by rail.

== See also ==
- Ferrocarriles Nacionales de México
- Rail transport in Mexico
