= Chihuahua (state) =

State of Mexico

- State
- Free and Sovereign State of Chihuahua; Estado Libre y Soberano de Chihuahua (Spanish)
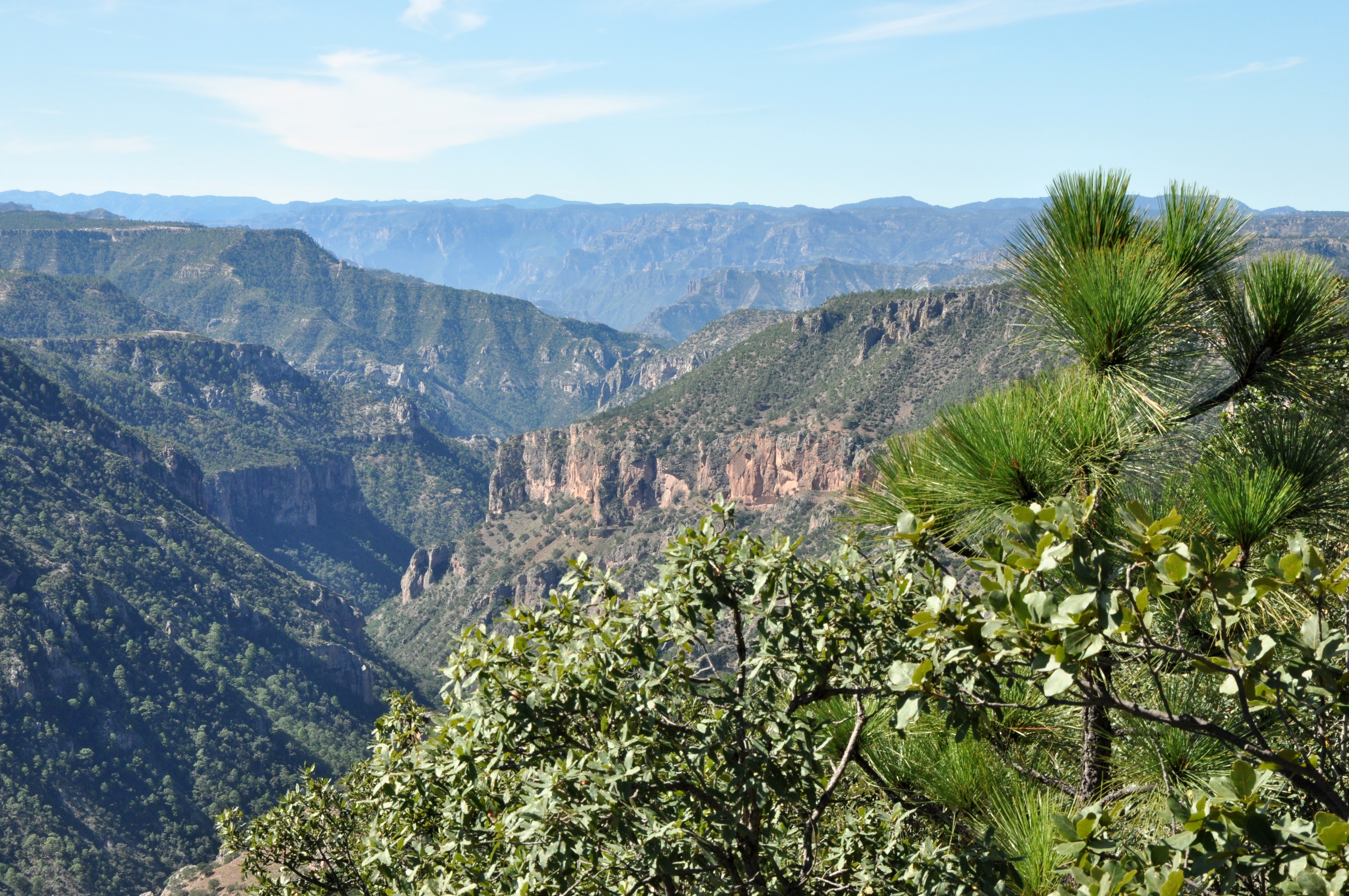
- The Sierra Madre Occidental

- Coat of arms
- Nickname: El Estado Grande ('The Big State')
- Motto: Valentía, Lealtad, Hospitalidad ('Bravery, Loyalty, Hospitality')
- Anthem: Himno del Estado de Chihuahua
- State of Chihuahua within Mexico
- Coordinates: 28°38′21″N 106°04′24″W
- Country: Mexico
- Capital: Chihuahua
- Largest city: Ciudad Juárez
- Municipalities: 67
- Admission: July 6, 1824
- Order: 18th

Government
  - Governor: María Eugenia Campos Galván (PAN)
  - Senators: Bertha Caraveo Camarena (Morena); Rafael Espino de la Peña (Morena); Gustavo Madero Muñoz (Independent)
  - Deputies: Federal deputies: • Daniel Murguía Lardizábal (1st); • Maité Vargas Meraz (2nd); • Lilia Aguilar Gil (3rd); • Daniela Álvarez Hernández (4th); • Salvador Alcántar Ortega (5th); • Laura Contreras Duarte (6th); • Patricia Terrazas Baca (7th); • Rocío González Alonso (8th); • Ángeles Gutiérrez Valdez (9th)

Area
  - Total: 247,460 km^{2} (95,540 sq mi)
- Ranked 1st
- Highest elevation (Cerro Mohinora): 3,300 m (10,800 ft)

Population (2020)
  - Total: 3,741,869
  - Rank: 11th
  - Density: 15.121/km^{2} (39.163/sq mi)
  - Rank: 29th
- Demonym: Chihuahuense

GDP
  - Total: MXN 1.050 trillion (US$52.2 billion) (2022)
  - Per capita: US$13,637 (2022)
- Time zones: UTC−06:00 (Zona Centro, America/Chihuahua, no DST)
- UTC−07:00 (Zona Pacífico, America/Ciudad_Juarez)
  - Summer (DST): UTC−06:00 (DST, America/Ciudad_Juarez)
- UTC−06:00 (Zona Centro, America/Ojinaga)
  - Summer (DST): UTC−05:00 (DST, America/Ojinaga)
- Postal code: 31, 33
- Area code: Area codes: • 614; • 621; • 625; • 626; • 627; • 628; • 629; • 635; • 636; • 639; • 648; • 649; • 652; • 656; • 659
- ISO 3166 code: MX-CHH
- HDI: ▲0.817 very high Ranked 10th of 32
- Website: Official website

Chihuahua (Spanish pronunciation: [tʃiˈwawa]), officially the Free and Sovereign State of Chihuahua (Note: Spanish: Estado Libre y Soberano de Chihuahua) is one of the 31 states which, along with Mexico City, are the 32 federal entities of Mexico. It is located in the northwestern part of Mexico and is bordered by the states of Sonora to the west, Sinaloa to the southwest, Durango to the south, and Coahuila to the east. To the north and northeast, it shares an extensive border with the U.S. adjacent to the U.S. states of New Mexico and Texas. The state was named after its capital city, Chihuahua City; the largest city is Ciudad Juárez. In 1864 the city of Chihuahua was declared capital of Mexico by Benito Juárez during the Reform War and French intervention, until 1867. The city of Parral was the largest producer of silver in the world in 1640. During the Mexican War of Independence, Miguel Hidalgo was executed on July 30, 1811, in Chihuahua city.

Although Chihuahua is primarily identified with its namesake, the Chihuahuan Desert, it has more forests than any other state in Mexico, aside from Durango. Due to its varied climate, the state has a large variety of fauna and flora. The state is mostly characterized by rugged mountainous terrain and wide river valleys. The Sierra Madre Occidental mountain range, part of the continental spine that also includes the Rocky Mountains, dominates the state's terrain, and is home to the state's greatest attraction, Las Barrancas del Cobre, or Copper Canyon, a canyon system larger and deeper than the Grand Canyon. The state also has the largest crystal cave in Mexico known as the Naica cave, discovered in 2001. Chihuahua is also home to the archaeological site of Paquimé in Casas Grandes that was created by the people of the Mogollon culture of Northern Mexico and is recognized as an UNESCO World Heritage site. Chihuahua is the largest state in Mexico by area, with an area of 247,455 square kilometres (95,543 sq mi), it is slightly larger than the United Kingdom, and slightly smaller than Wyoming, the tenth largest US state by area. The state is consequently known under the nickname El Estado Grande ('The Great State' or 'The Big State').

The famous Mexican train Ch-P, the "Chepe", starts from Calle Méndez in Chihuahua City, passes through Copper Canyon in the Sierra Madre Occidental, and reaches Los Mochis on the Gulf of California coast.

On the slope of the Sierra Madre Occidental mountains (around the regions of Casas Grandes, Cuauhtémoc and Parral), there are vast prairies of short yellow grass, the source of the bulk of the state's agricultural production. Most of the inhabitants live along the Rio Grande Valley, and the Conchos River Valley. The etymology of the name Chihuahua has long been disputed by historians and linguists. The most accepted theory explains that the name was derived from the Nahuatl language meaning "the place where the water of the rivers meet" (i.e. "confluence", cf. Koblenz).

Chihuahua has a diversified state economy. It is the top exporting state in the country due its manufacturing in electronics and transportation equipment. The three most important economic centers in the state are Ciudad Juárez, an international manufacturing center; Chihuahua, the state capital; and Cuauhtémoc, the state's main agriculture hub and an internationally recognized center for apple production. The capital city, Chihuahua, is ranked by IMCO among some of the most competitive cities in Mexico. The city's municipality's Human Development Index is 0.842, among the highest in the country after Monterrey and Mexico City. Today, Chihuahua serves as an important commercial route prospering from billions of dollars from international trade as a result of NAFTA. The state also suffers the fallout of illicit trade and activities from drug cartels, especially at the border. The state is also home to inventors; Victor Leaton Ochoa, Rafael Mendoza Blanco and Luis T. Hernandez Terrazas.

== History ==
=== Prehistory ===
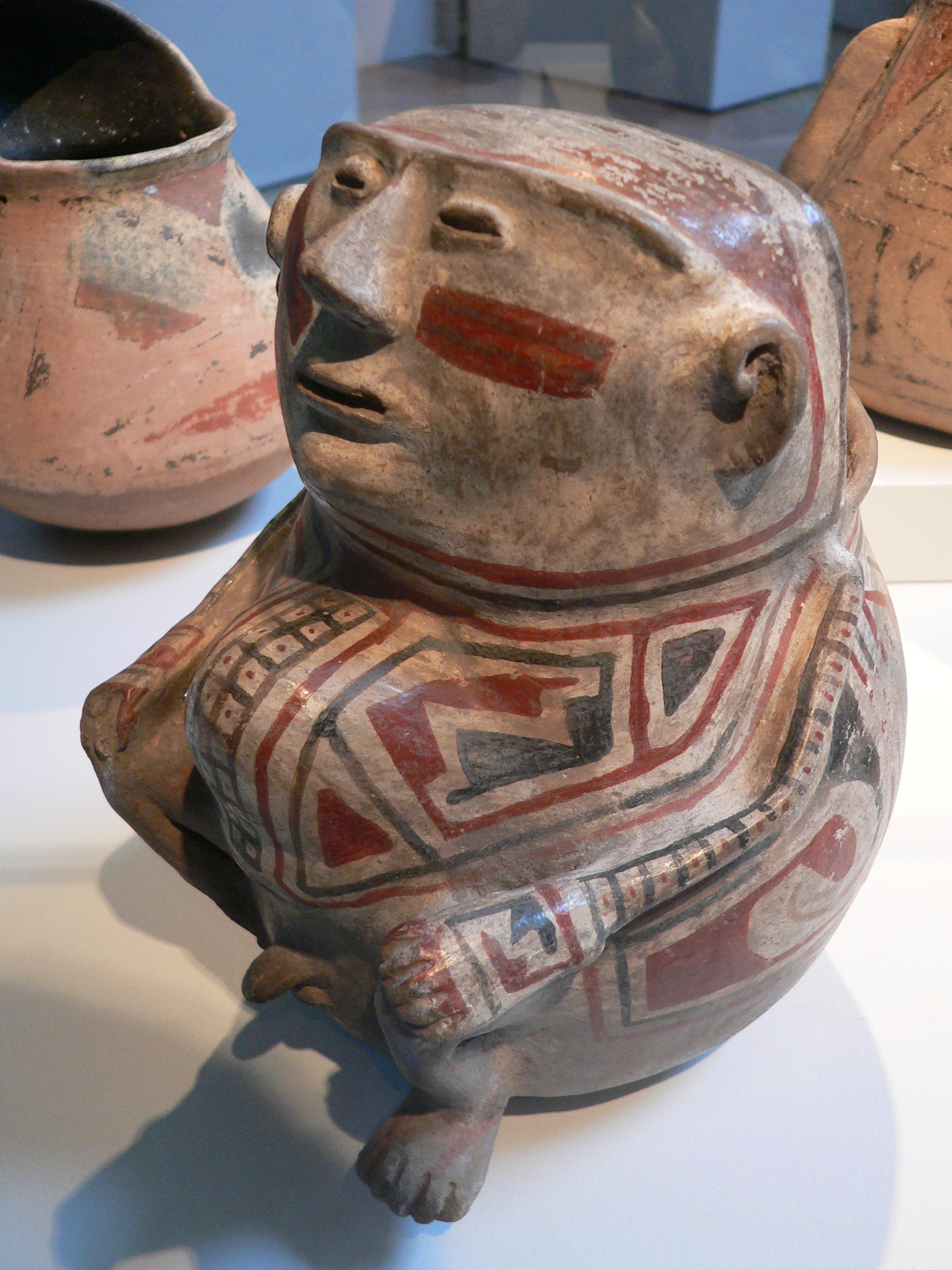
Paquimé artifact found at Casas Grandes

The earliest evidence of human inhabitants of Chihuahua was discovered in the area of the Samalayuca Dune Fields and Rancho Colorado. Clovis points have been found in northeastern Chihuahua that have been dated from 12,000 to 7000 BCE. It is thought that these inhabitants were hunter-gatherers.

Inhabitants of the state later developed farming with the domestication of maize. An archeological site in northern Chihuahua known as Cerro Juanaqueña revealed squash cultivation, irrigation techniques, and ceramic artifacts dating to around 2000 BCE.

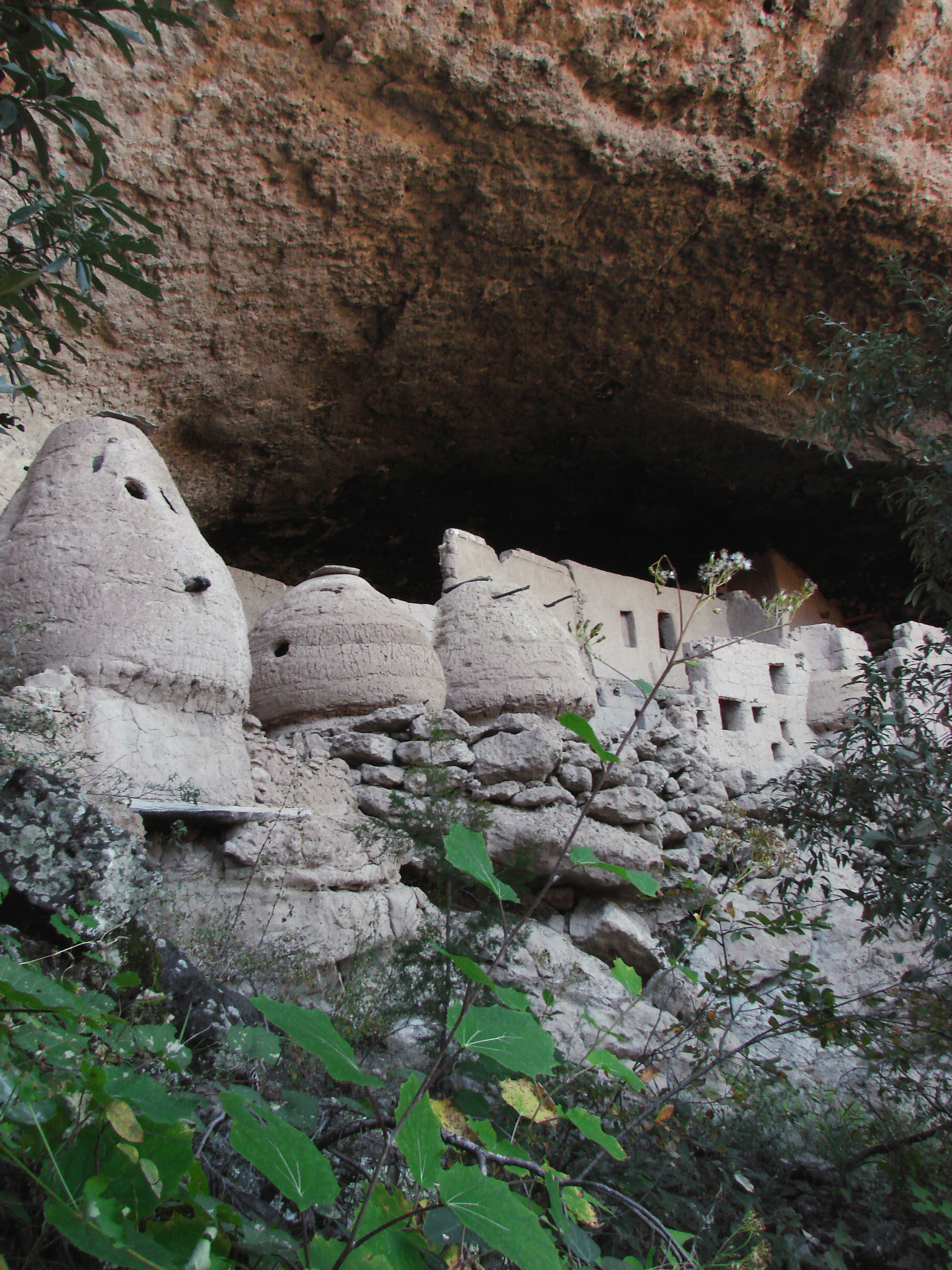
Cliff dwellings at Las Jarillas Cave, part of the Cuarenta Casas archeological site.

Between 300 and 1300 in the southern part of the state, in a region known as Aridoamerica, groups survived by hunting, gathering, and farming. Nahuan speakers referred to these groups as the Chichimeca. They are the ancestors of the Tepehuán, speakers of the Piman subfamily of the Uto-Aztecan languages.

Between 300 and 1300 in the northern part of the state, along the wide, fertile San Miguel Valley, the Casas Grandes "Big Houses" culture developed into an advanced civilization. The Casas Grandes civilization is part of a major prehistoric archaeological culture known as Mogollon culture, which is related to the Ancestral Puebloans. Paquimé was the center of the Casas Grandes civilization. Extensive archaeological evidence shows commerce, agriculture, and hunting at Paquimé and Cuarenta Casas "Forty Houses".

Cueva de las Ventanas "Cave of Windows", a series of cliff dwellings along an important trade route and Las Jarillas Cave that scramble along the canyons of the Sierra Madre Occidental in northwestern Chihuahua, date between 1205 and 1260 and belong to the Paquimé culture. Cuarenta Casas is believed to have been a branch settlement from Paquimé, established to protect the trade route from attack. Archaeologists believe the civilization began to decline during the 13th century, and by the 15th century, some Paquimeros sought refuge in the Sierra Madre Occidental while others emigrated north and joined the Ancestral Puebloans there. According to anthropologists, current natives peoples–the Uto-Aztecan-speaking Yaqui, Mayo, Opata, and Rarámuri–are descended from the Casas Grandes culture.

During the 14th century in the northeastern part of the state, the Conquistadores referred to Plains Indians of the region as Jumanos. They hunted bison along the Rio Grande who left numerous rock paintings throughout the northeastern part of the state. The Suma and Manso peoples are indigenous peoples of the region who are descended from Jumano and post-Casas Grandes peoples.

=== Colonial era ===
Nueva Vizcaya was the first province of northern New Spain to be explored and settled by the Conquistadores. Around 1528, a group of Spaniards led by Álvar Núñez Cabeza de Vaca first entered what is now Chihuahua. The conquest of the territory lasted nearly a century and the Spaniards encountered fierce resistance from peoples they called La Junta Indians, but the colonial desires of Habsburg Spain to transform the region into a bustling mining center led to a strong strategy to control the area.

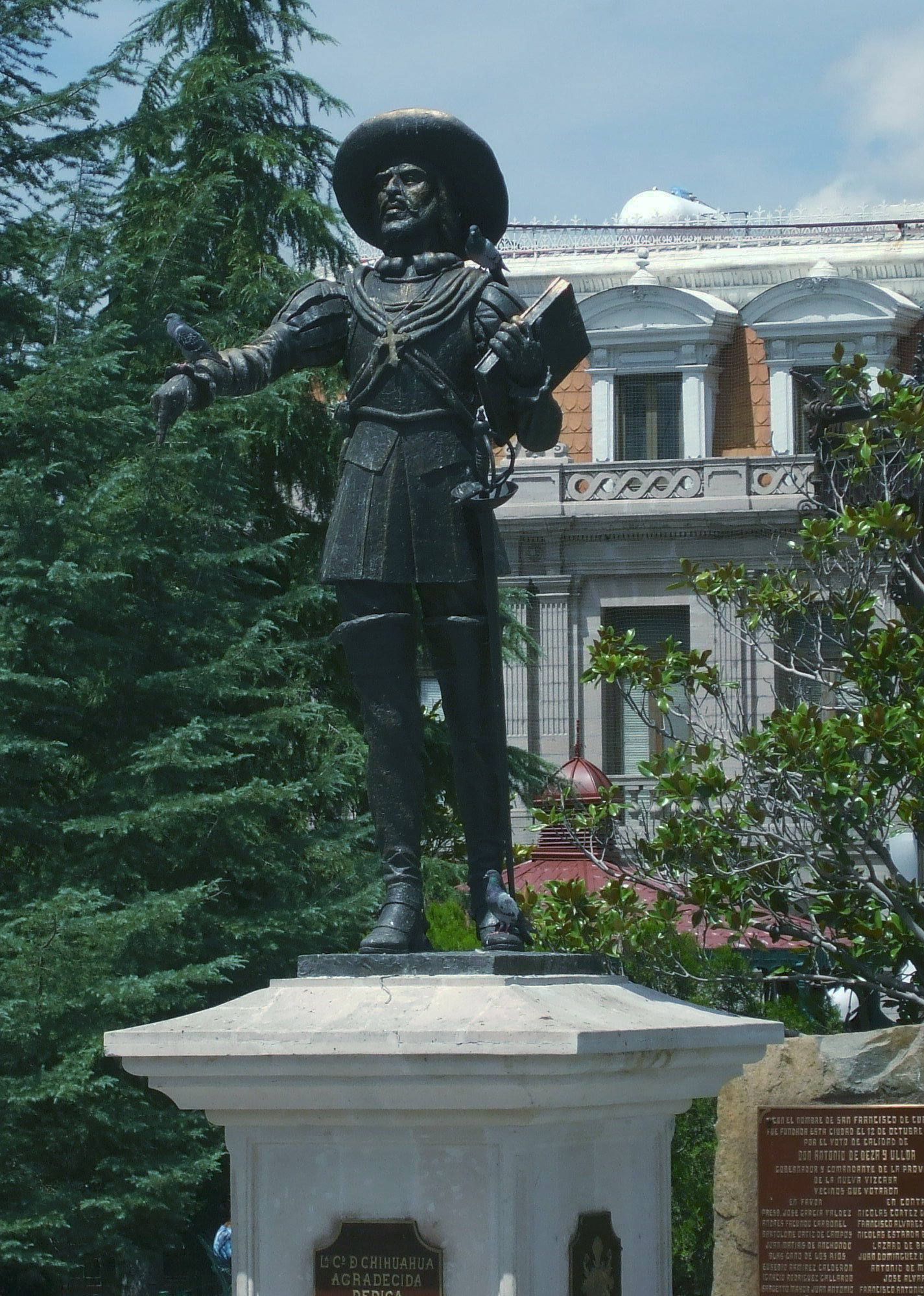
Antonio de Deza y Ulloa the founder of Chihuahua, Chihuahua

In 1562, Francisco de Ibarra headed a personal expedition in search of the mythical cities of Cíbola and Quivira; he traveled through Chihuahua. Francisco de Ibarra is thought to have been the first European to see the ruins of Paquimé. In 1564, Rodrigo de Río de Loza, a lieutenant under Francisco de Ibarra, stayed behind after the expedition and found gold at the foot of the mountains of the Sierra Madre Occidental; he founded the first Spanish city in the region, Santa Bárbara in 1567 by bringing 400 European families to the settlement.

A few years later, in 1569, the Chamuscado and Rodríguez Expedition, consisting of Franciscan missionaries led by Agustín Rodríguez from the coast of Sinaloa and Durango, founded the first Spanish missions in the state in Valle de San Bartolomé (now Valle de Allende). Agustín Rodríguez evangelized the native population until 1581. Between 1586 and 1588, an epidemic caused a temporary exodus of the small population in the territory of Nueva Vizcaya.

Santa Bárbara became the launching place for expeditions into New Mexico by Spanish conquistadors like Antonio de Espejo, Gaspar Castaño, Antonio Gutiérrez de Umaña, Francisco Leyba de Bonilla, and Vicente de Zaldívar. Several expeditions were led to find a shorter route from Santa Bárbara to New Mexico. In April 1598, Juan de Oñate found a short route from Santa Bárbara to New Mexico which came to be called El Paso del Norte (The Northern Pass). The discovery of El Paso del Norte was important for the expansion of El Camino Real de Tierra Adentro (The Inner Land Royal Road) to link Spanish settlements in New Mexico to Mexico City; El Camino Real de Tierra Adentro facilitated transport of settlers and supplies to New Mexico and Camargo.

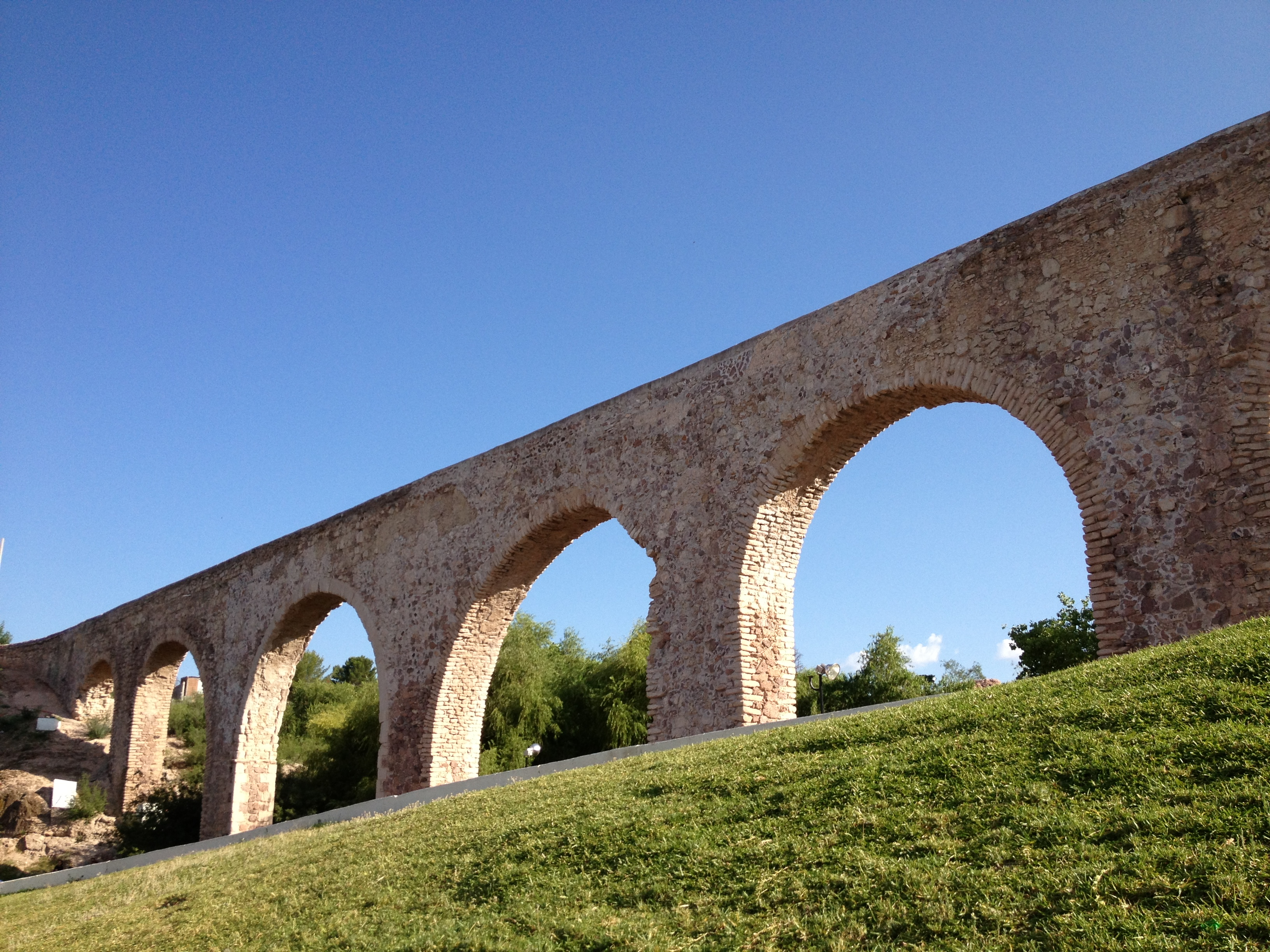
An 18th century colonial aqueduct built in Chihuahua City

In 1631, Juan Rangel de Biezma discovered a rich vein of silver and subsequently established San José del Parral near the site. Parral remained a vital economic and cultural center for the next three centuries. On December 8, 1659, Fray García de San Francisco founded the mission of Nuestra Señora de Guadalupe de Mansos del Paso del Río del Norte and founded the town El Paso del Norte (now Ciudad Juárez) in 1667.

The Spanish society that developed in the region replaced the sparse indigenous population with an absence of slaves and indentured servants. In 1680, settlers from Santa Fe sought refuge in El Paso del Norte for twelve years after fleeing the attacks from Pueblo peoples, but returned to Santa Fe in 1692 after Diego de Vargas recaptured the city and vicinity. In 1709, Antonio de Deza y Ulloa founded the state capital of Chihuahua City; shortly after, the city became the headquarters for the regional mining offices of the Spanish Empire known as Real de Minas de San Francisco de Cuéllar in honor of the Viceroy of New Spain, Francisco Fernández de la Cueva, 10th Duke of Alburquerque.

=== Mexican War of Independence ===
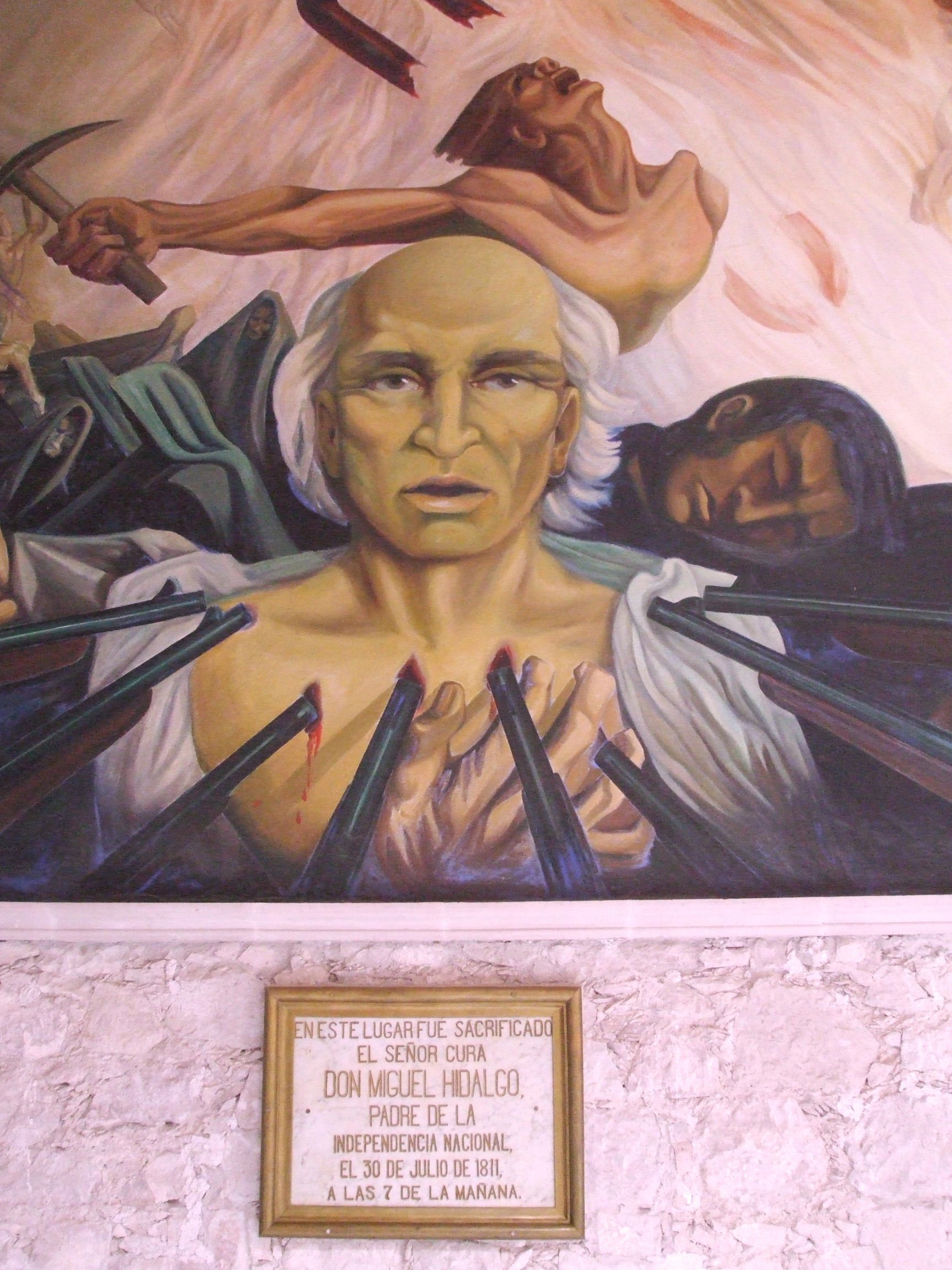
A mural of Miguel Hidalgo y Costilla in the Government Palace of Chihuahua by Aarón Piña Mora

During the Napoleonic occupation of Spain, Miguel Hidalgo y Costilla, a progressive Catholic priest, declared Mexican independence in the small town of Dolores, Guanajuato on September 16, 1810, with a proclamation known as the "Grito de Dolores".

Hidalgo built a large support among intellectuals, liberal priests, and many poor people. He fought to protect the rights of the poor and indigenous populations. He started on a march to Mexico City, but retreated back north when faced with the elite of the royal forces at the outskirts of the capital. He established a liberal government in Guadalajara, but was soon forced to flee north by the royal forces that recaptured the city. Hidalgo attempted to reach the United States and gain American support for Mexican independence. Hidalgo reached Saltillo, Coahuila, where he publicly resigned his military post and rejected a pardon offered by Viceroy Francisco Javier Venegas in return for Hidalgo's surrender. A short time later, he and his supporters were captured by royalist Ignacio Elizondo at the Wells of Baján on March 21, 1811 and taken to the city of Chihuahua.

Hidalgo forced the Bishop of Valladolid, Manuel Abad y Queipo, to rescind the excommunication order he had circulated against him on September 24, 1810. Later, the Inquisition issued an excommunication edict on October 13, 1810, condemning Miguel Hidalgo as a seditionary, apostate, and heretic.

Hidalgo was turned over to the Bishop of Durango, Francisco Gabriel de Olivares, for an official defrocking and excommunication on July 27, 1811. He was then found guilty of treason by a military court and executed by firing squad on July 30 at 7 am. Before his execution, he thanked his jailers, Privates Ortega and Melchor, in letters for their humane treatment. At his execution, Hidalgo placed his right hand over his heart to show the riflemen where they should aim. He also refused the use of a blindfold. His body, along with the bodies of Allende, Aldama and José Mariano Jiménez were decapitated, and the heads were put on display on the four corners of the Alhóndiga de Granaditas in Guanajuato. The heads remained there for ten years, until the end of the Mexican War of Independence, to serve as a warning to other insurgents.

Hidalgo's headless body was first displayed outside the prison but then buried in the San Francisco Temple in Chihuahua. Those remains would later be transferred, in 1824, to Mexico City.

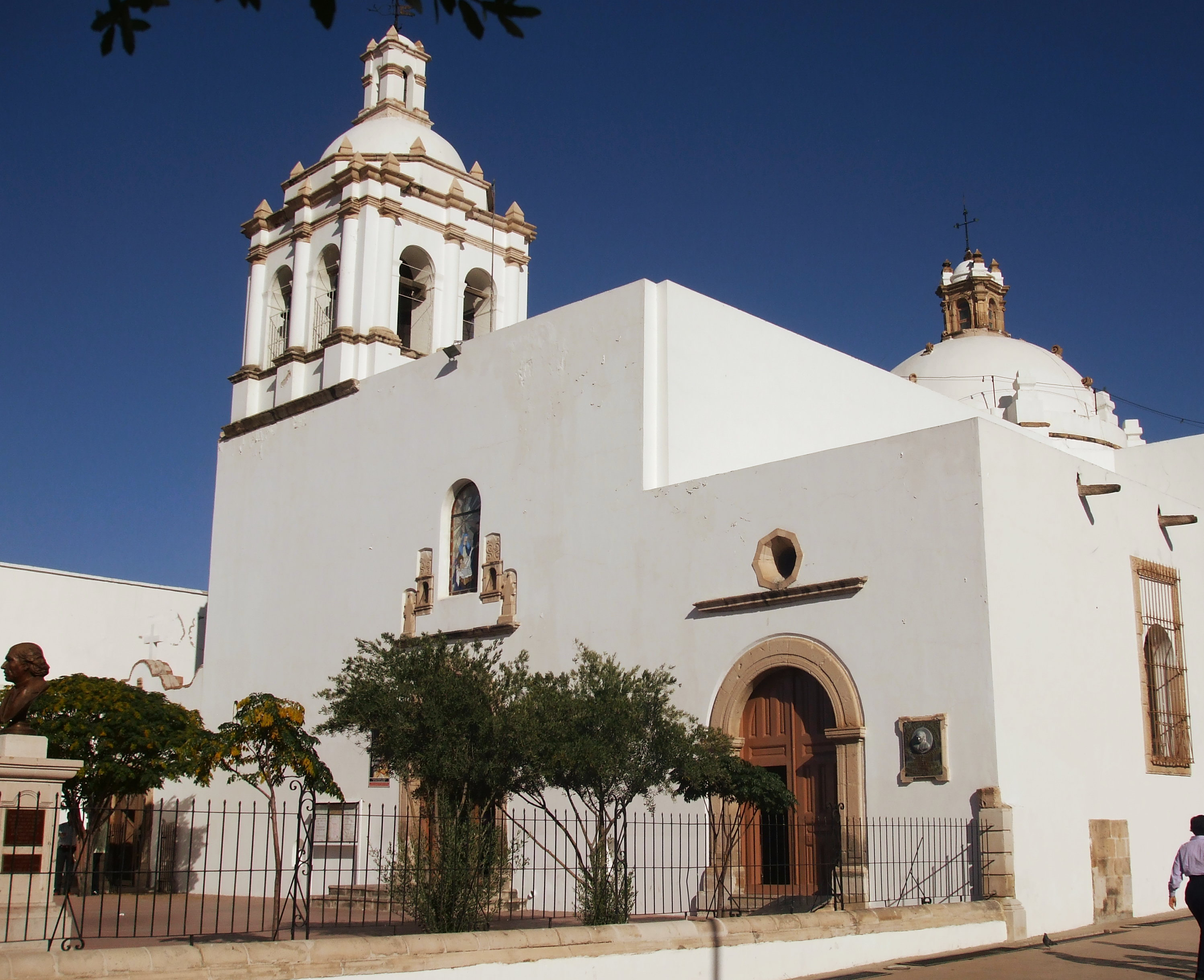
San Francisco Temple, Chihuahua.

Hidalgo's death resulted in a political vacuum on the insurgent side until 1812. The royalist military commander, General Felix Calleja, continued to pursue rebel troops. Insurgent fighting evolved into guerrilla warfare, and eventually the next major insurgent leader, José María Morelos, who had led rebel movements with Hidalgo, became head of the insurgents.

Hidalgo is hailed as the Father of the Nation even though it was Agustín de Iturbide and not Hidalgo who achieved Mexican Independence in 1821. Shortly after gaining independence, the day to celebrate it varied between September 16, the day of Hidalgo's Grito, and September 27, the day Iturbide rode into Mexico City to end the war. Later, political movements would favor the more liberal Hidalgo over the conservative Iturbide, so that eventually September 16, 1810 became the officially recognized day of Mexican independence. The reason for this is that Hidalgo is considered to be "precursor and creator of the rest of the heroes of the (Mexican War of) Independence."

Hidalgo became an icon for Mexicans resisting tyranny. Diego Rivera painted Hidalgo's image in half a dozen murals. José Clemente Orozco depicted him with a flaming torch of liberty and considered the painting among his best work. David Alfaro Siqueiros was commissioned by San Nicolás University in Morelia to paint a mural for a celebration commemorating the 200th anniversary of Hidalgo's birth. The town of his parish was renamed Dolores Hidalgo in his honor and the state of Hidalgo was created in 1869. Every year on the night of September 15–16, the president of Mexico re-enacts the Grito from the balcony of the National Palace. This scene is repeated by the heads of cities and towns all over Mexico. The remains of Miguel Hidalgo y Costilla lie in the column of the Angel of Independence in Mexico City. Next to it is a lamp lit to represent the sacrifice of those who gave their lives for Mexican Independence.

=== Constituent legislatures ===
Map of Chihuahua in 1824

In the constituent legislature or convention, the conservative and liberal elements formed using the nicknames of Chirrines and Cuchas. The military entered as a third party. The elections for the first regular legislature were disputed, and it was not until May 1, 1826, that the body was installed. The liberals gained control and the opposition responded by fomenting a conspiracy. This was promptly stopped with the aid of informers, and more strenuous measures were taken against the conservatives. Extra powers were conferred on the Durango governor, Santiago Baca Ortiz, deputy to the first national congress, and leader of the liberal party.

=== González's rebellion ===
Opponents continued to plot against the new government. In March 1827, Lieutenant J.M. González proclaimed himself comandante general, arrested the governor, and dissolved the legislature. General Parras was sent to suppress the movement. Comandante general J. J. Ayestarán was replaced by José Figueroa. When elections failed, the government intervened in favor of the Yorkino party, which had elected Vicente Guerrero to the presidency.

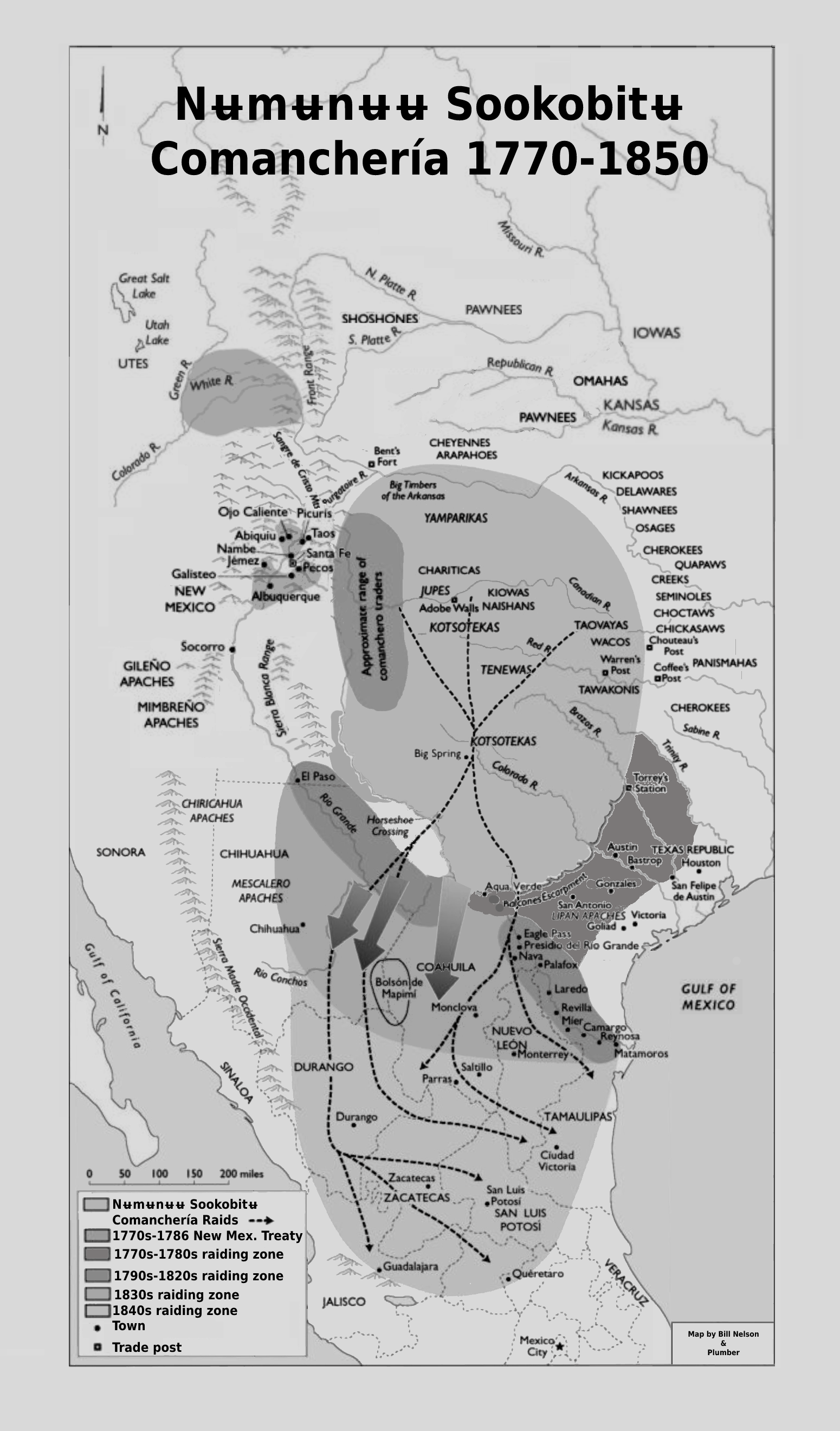
The approximate boundaries of Comancheria and Comanche raids into Mexico

Because of the general instability of the federal government during 1828, the installation of the new legislature did not take place until the middle of the following year. It was quickly dissolved by Governor Santiago de Baca Ortiz, who replaced it with a more pronounced Yorkino type. When Guerrero's liberal administration was overthrown in December, Gaspar de Ochoa aligned with Anastasio Bustamante, and in February 1830, organized an opposition group that arrested the new governor, F. Elorriaga, along with other prominent Yorkinos. He then summoned the legislature, which had been dissolved by Baca. The civil and military authorities were now headed by J. A. Pescador and Simón Ochoa.

=== Vicente Guerrero ===
The general features of the preceding occurrence applied also to Chihuahua, although in a modified form. The first person elected under the new constitution of 1825 was Simón Elías González, who being in Sonora, was induced to remain there. José Antonio Arcé took his place as ruler in Chihuahua. In 1829, González became general commander of Chihuahua, when his term of office on the west coast expired. Arcé was less of a yorkino than his confrère of Durango. Although unable to resist the popular demand for the expulsion of the Spaniards, he soon quarreled with the legislature, which declared itself firmly for Guerrero, and announcing his support of Bustamante's revolution, he suspended, in March 1830, eight members of that body, the vice-governor, and several other officials, and expelled them from the state. The course thus outlined was followed by Governor José Isidro Madero, who succeeded in 1830, associated with J. J. Calvo as general commander, stringent laws being issued against secret societies, which were supposed to be the main spring to the anti-clerical feeling among liberals.

=== Durango and Bustamante ===
The anti-clerical feeling was widespread, and Durango supported the initial reaction against the government at Mexico. In May 1832, José Urrea, a rising officer, supported the restoration of President Pedraza. On July 20, Governor Elorriaga was reinstated, and Baca along with the legislative minority were brought back to form a new legislature, which met on September 1. Chihuahua showed no desire to imitate the revolutionary movement and Urrea prepared to invade the state. Comandante-general J.J.Calvo threatened to retaliate, and a conflict seemed imminent. The entry of General Santa Anna into Mexico brought calm, as the leaders waited for clarity.

=== Santa Anna ===
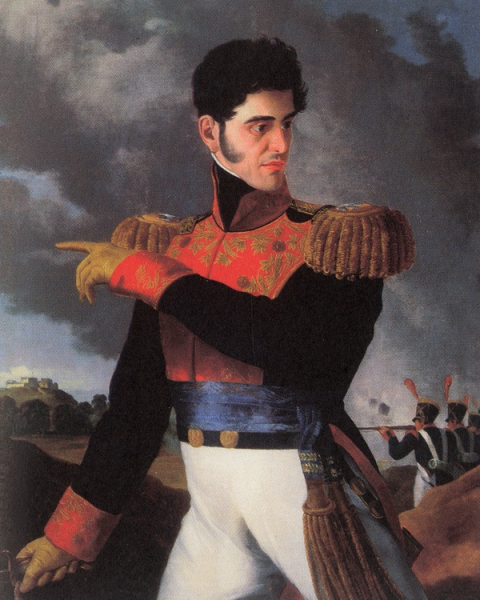
Santa Anna, 8th President of Mexico.

Bishop José Antonio Laureano de Zubiría of Durango was banished for resisting the law relating to priests and other encroachments on the church; another joined the western states in a short lived coalition for sustaining the federal system. Chihuahua adopted the Plan of Cuernavaca in July 1834 while President Valentín Gómez Farías was in power. Because the plan was not enforced, commanding officer, Colonel J.I. Gutiérrez, declared the term of the legislature and governor expired on September 3.

At a convention of citizens called to select a new provisional ruler, Gutiérrez obtained the vote, with P. J. Escalante for his deputy, and a council to guide the administration. Santa Anna ordered the reinstatement of Mendarozqueta as comandante general. Gutiérrez yielded, but Escalante refused to surrender office, demonstrations of support ensued, but Escalante yielded when troops were summoned from Zacatecas. A new election brought a new legislature, and conforming governors. In September 1835 José Urrea a federalist army officer came into power.

Comandante general Simón Elías González, was nominated governor and military command was given to Colonel J.J. Calvo, whose firmness had earned well-merited praise. The state was in the midst of a war with the Apaches, which became the focus of all their energy and resources. After a review of the situation, Simón Elías González declared that the interests of the territory would be best served by uniting the civil and military power, at least while the campaign lasted. He resigned under opposition, but was renominated in 1837.

=== Mexican–American War ===
Battles of Mexican–American War in Chihuahua

The state seemed at relative calm compared to the rest of the country due to its close ties to the United States until 1841. In 1843 the possibility of war was anticipated by the state government and it began to reinforce the defense lines along the political boundary with Texas. Supplies of weapons were sent to fully equip the military and steps were taken to improve efficiency at the presidios. Later, the Regimen for the Defenders of the Border were organized by the state which were made up of: light cavalry, four squads of two brigades, and a small force of 14 men and 42 officials at the price of 160,603 pesos per year. During the beginning of the 1840s, private citizens took it upon themselves to stop the commercial caravans of supplies from the United States, but being so far away from the large suppliers in central Mexico the caravan was allowed to continue in March 1844. Continuing to anticipate a war, the state legislature on July 11, 1846 by decree enlisted 6,000 men to serve along the border; during that time Ángel Trías quickly rose to power by portraying zealous anti-American rhetoric. Trías took the opportunity to dedicate important state resources to gain economic concessions from the people and loans from many municipalities in preparation to defend the state; he used all the money he received to equip and organize a large volunteer militia. Ángel Trías took measures for state self-dependence in regards to state militia due to the diminishing financial support from the federal government.

The United States Congress declared war on Mexico on May 13, 1846 after only having a few hours to debate. Although President José Mariano Paredes' issuance of a manifesto on May 23 is sometimes considered the declaration of war, Mexico officially declared war by Congress on July 7. After the American invasion of New Mexico, Chihuahua sent 12,000 men led by Colonel Vidal to the border to stop the American military advance into the state. The Mexican forces being impatient to confront the American forces passed beyond El Paso del Norte about 20 miles (32 km) north along the Rio Grande. The first battle that Chihuahua fought was the battle of El Bracito; the Mexican forces consisting of 500 cavalry and 70 infantry confronted a force of 1,100–1,200 Americans on December 25, 1846. The battle ended badly by the Mexican forces that were then forced to retreat back into the state of Chihuahua. By December 27, 1846, the American forces occupied El Paso del Norte. General Doniphan maintained camp in El Paso del Norte awaiting supplies and artillery which he received in February 1847.

On February 8, 1847, Doniphan continued his march with 924 men mostly from Missouri; he accompanied a train of 315 wagons of a large commercial caravan heading to the state capital. Meanwhile, the Mexican forces in the state had time to prepare a defense against the Americans. About 20 miles (32 km) north of the capital where two mountain ranges join from east to west is the only pass into the capital; known as Sacramento Pass, this point is now part of present-day Chihuahua City. The Battle of Sacramento was the most important battle fought in the state of Chihuahua because it was the sole defense for the state capital. The battle ended quickly because of some devastating defensive errors from the Mexican forces and the ingenious strategic moves by the American forces. After their loss at the Battle of Sacramento, the remaining Mexican soldiers retreated south, leaving the city to American occupation. Almost 300 Mexicans were killed in the battle, as well as almost 300 wounded. The Americans also confiscated large amounts of Mexican supplies and took 400 Mexican soldiers prisoners of war. American forces maintained an occupation of the state capital for the rest of the Mexican–American War.

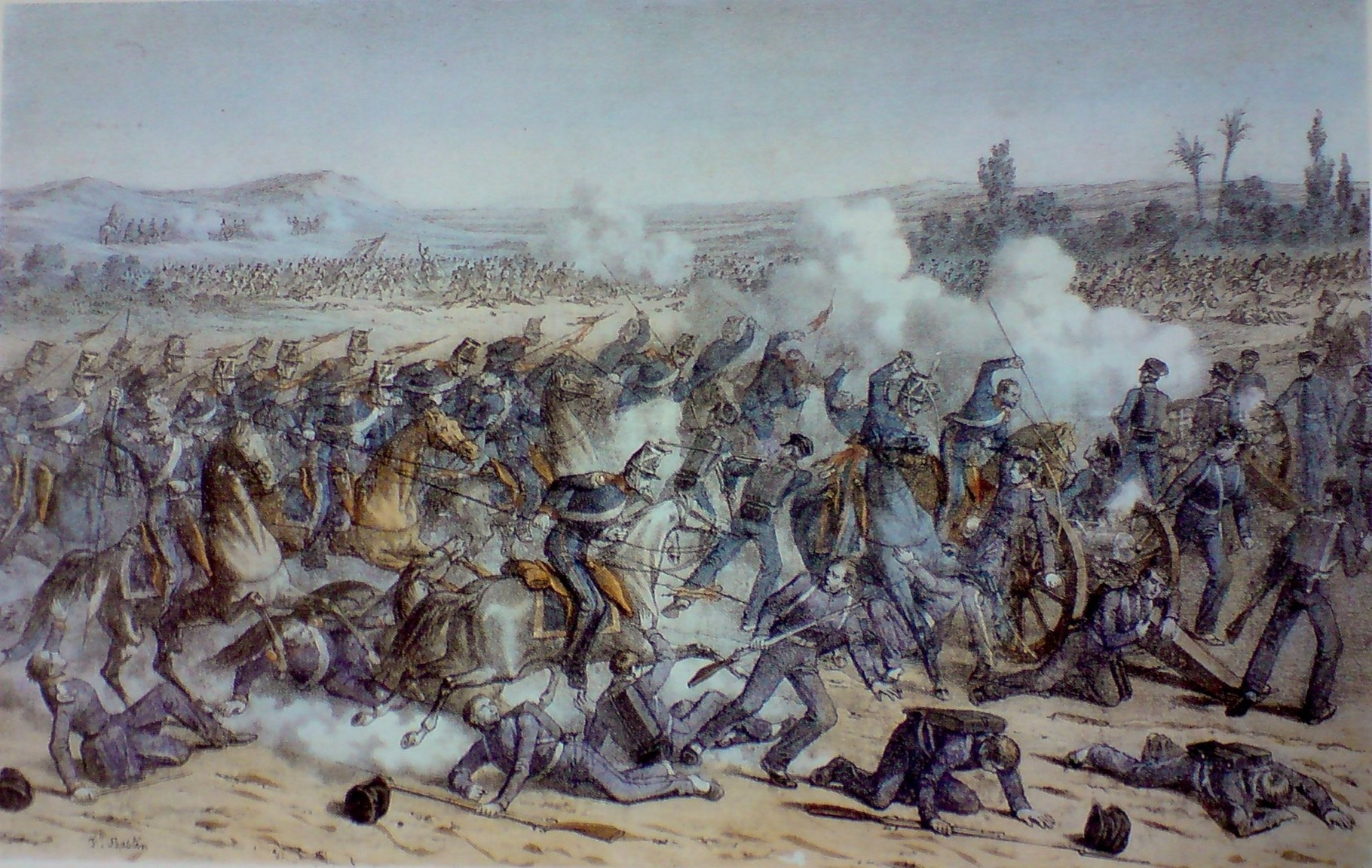
Battle of the Sacramento River

The Treaty of Guadalupe Hidalgo, signed on February 2, 1848, by American diplomat Nicholas Trist and Mexican plenipotentiary representatives Luis G. Cuevas, Bernardo Couto, and Miguel Atristain, ended the war, gave the U.S. undisputed control of Texas, and established the U.S.–Mexican border of the Rio Grande. As news of peace negotiations reached the state, new call to arms began to flare among the people of the state. But as the Mexican officials in Chihuahua heard that General Price was heading back to Mexico with a large force comprising several companies of infantry and three companies of cavalry and one division of light artillery from Santa Fe on February 8, 1848, Ángel Trías sent a message to Sacramento Pass to ask for succession of the area as they understood the war had concluded. General Price, misunderstanding this as a deception by the Mexican forces, continued to advance towards the state capital. On March 16, 1848 Price began negotiations with Ángel Trías, but the Mexican leader responded with an ultimatum to General Price. The American forces engaged with the Mexican forces near Santa Cruz de los Rosales on March 16, 1848. The Battle of Santa Cruz de los Rosales was the last battle of the Mexican–American War and it occurred after the peace treaty was signed. The American forces maintained control over the state capital for three months after the confirmation of the peace treaty. The American presence served to delay the possible succession of the state which had been discussed at the end of 1847, and the state remained under United States occupation until May 22, 1848.

During the American occupation of the state, the number of Indian attacks was drastically reduced, but in 1848 the attacks resumed to such a degree that the Mexican officials had no choice but to resume military projects to protect Mexican settlements in the state. Through the next three decades the state faced constant attacks from the indigenous on Mexican settlements. After the occupation the people of the state were worried about the potential attack from the hostile indigenous tribes north of the Rio Grande; as a result a decree on July 19, 1848, the state established 18 military colonies along the Rio Grande. The new military colonies were to replace the presidios as population centers to prevent future invasions by indigenous tribes; these policies remained prominent in the state until 1883. Eventually the state replaced the old state security with a state policy to form militias organized with every Mexican in the state capable to serve between the ages of 18 and 55 to fulfill the mandate of having six men defending for every 1000 residents.

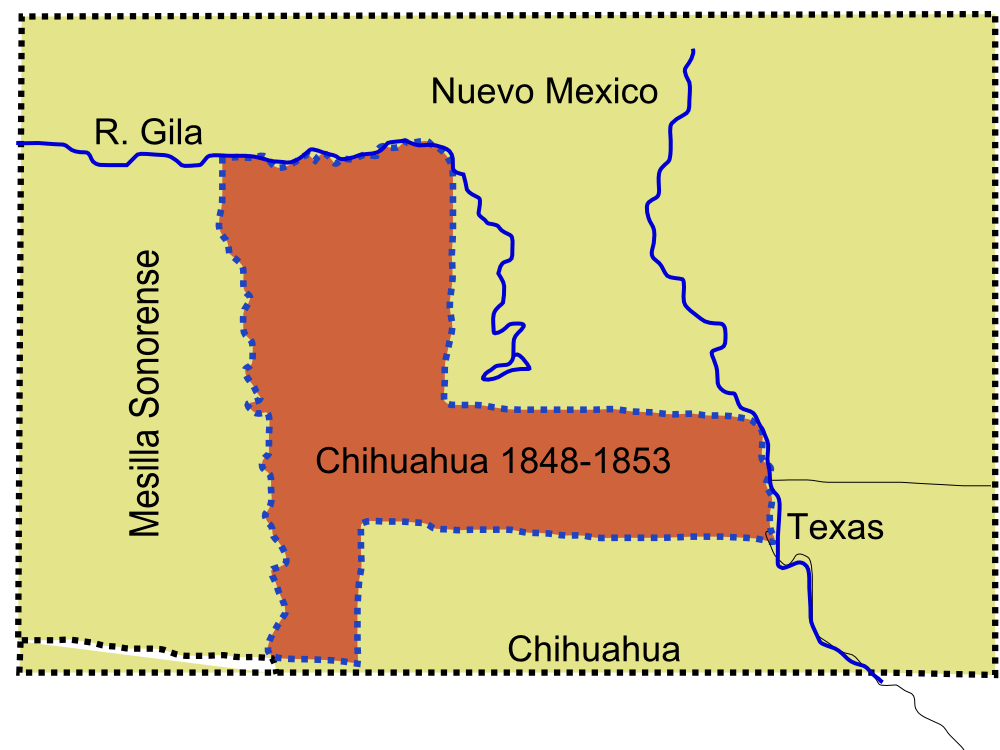
La Mesilla, a large area that was claimed by the state of Chihuahua.

=== La Mesilla ===
The frontier counties of the state along the border with the United States expected federal protection from the federal government under Herrera and Arista, but were soon disappointed by the federal government's decision to deploy military forces to other areas of the country due to internal challenges in the state of Jalisco. Ángel Trías led a rebellion to successfully depose the unpopular conservative Governor Cordero at the end of 1852.

Despite the efforts of strong political forces led by Ángel Trías in the state could not stop President Santa Anna from selling La Mesilla as part of the Gadsden Purchase on December 30, 1853 for 15 million USD. It was then ratified in the United States on April 25, 1854 and signed by President Franklin Pierce, with final approval action taken by Mexico on June 8, 1854. The citizens of the area held strong anti-American sentiments and raided American settlers and travelers across the area.

=== The Reform War and the French Intervention ===
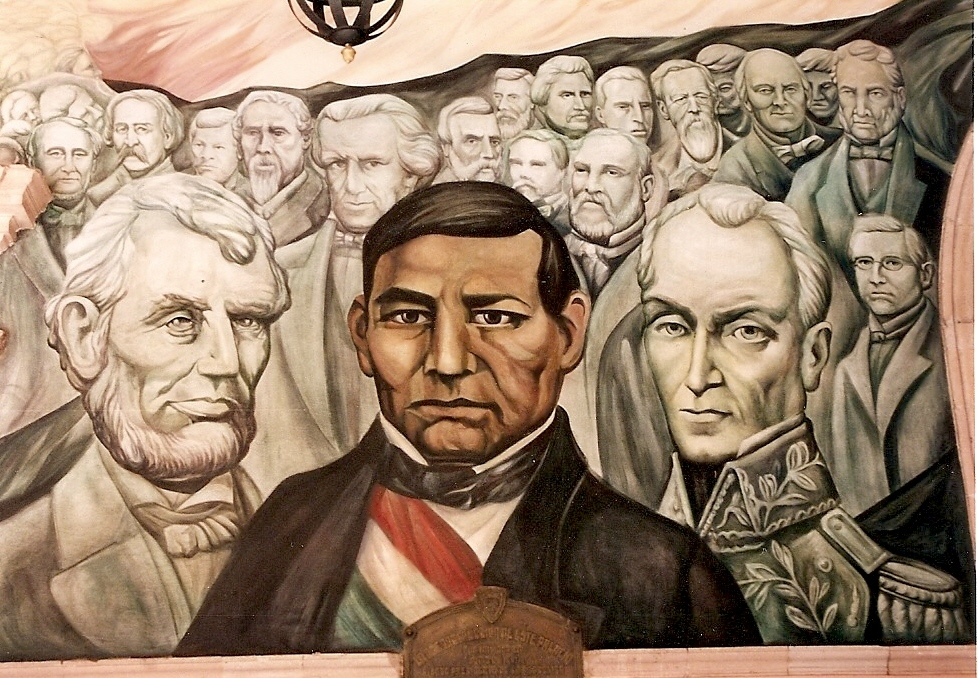
A mural by Piña in the Government Palace, honouring the liberators Abraham Lincoln, Benito Juárez and Simón Bolívar

The state united behind the Plan of Ayutla and ratified the new constitution in 1855. The state was able to survive through the Reform War with minimal damage due to the large number of liberal political figures. The 1858 conservative movement did not succeed in the state even after the successful military campaign of the conservative Zuloaga with 1,000 men occupied the cities of Chihuahua and Parral. In August 1859, Zuloaga and his forces were defeated by the liberal Orozco and his forces; Orozco soon after deposed the state governor, but had to flee to Durango two months later. In the late 1860s the conservative General Cajen briefly entered the state after his campaign through the state of Jalisco and helped establish conservative politicians and ran out the liberal leaders Jesús González Ortega and José María Patoni. Cajen took possession of the state capital and established himself as governor; he brooked no delay in uniting a large force to combat the liberal forces which he defeated in La Batalla del Gallo. Cajen attained several advantages over the liberals within the state, but soon lost his standing due to a strong resurgence of the liberal forces within the state. The successful liberal leaders José María Patoni of Durango and J.E. Muñoz of Chihuahua quickly strengthened their standing by limiting the political rights of the clergy implementing the presidential decree. The state elected General Luis Terrazas, a liberal leader, as governor; he would continue to fight small battles within the state to suppress conservative uprisings during 1861.

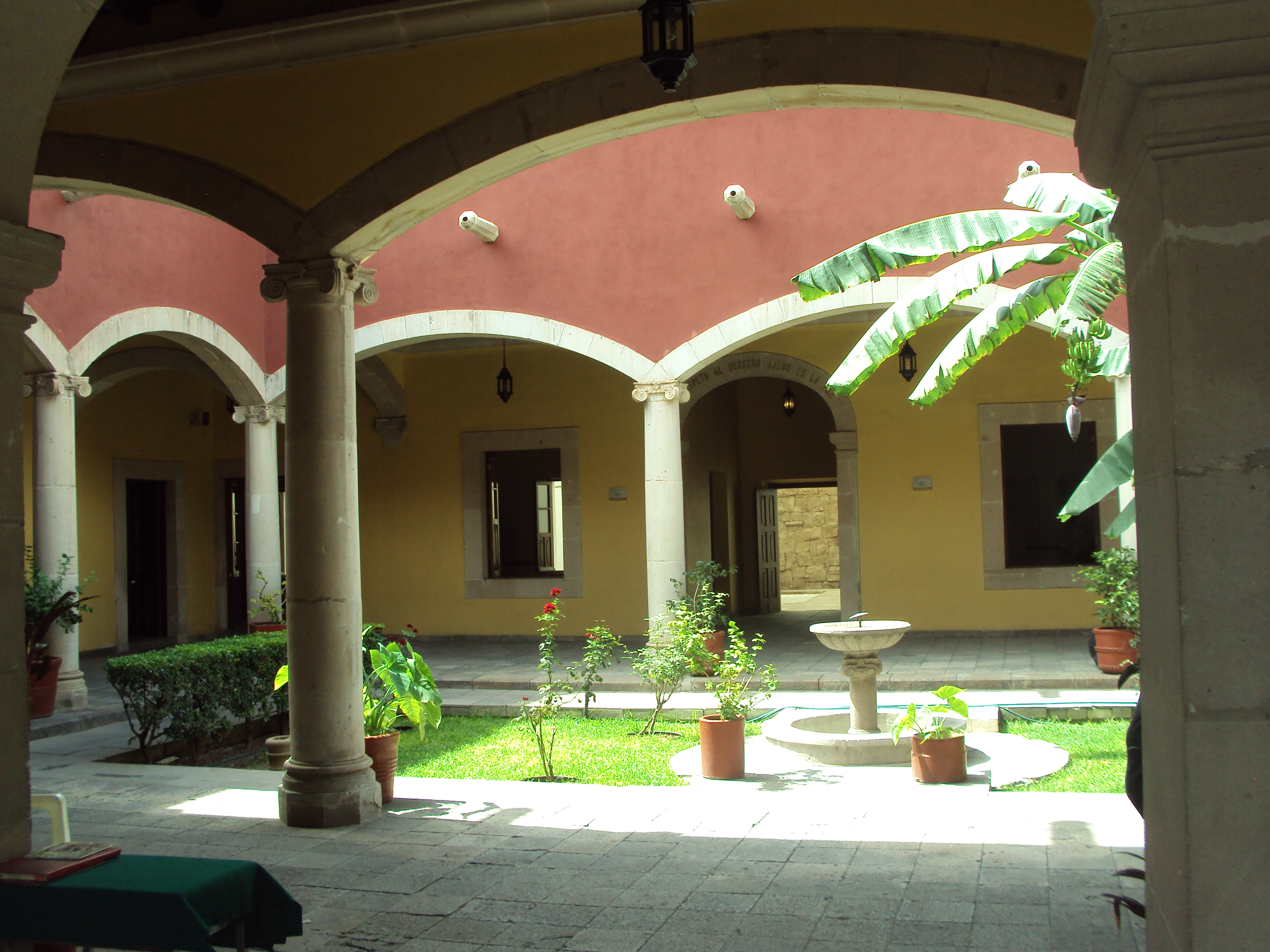
Museo Casa Juárez, a 19th-century building in downtown Chihuahua city, that served as the de facto National Palace of Mexico.

In consequence to the Reform War, the federal government was bankrupt and could not pay its foreign debts to Spain, England, and France. On July 17, 1861, President Juárez decreed a moratorium on payment to foreign debtors for a period of two years. Spain, England, and France did not accept the moratorium by Mexico; they united at the Convention of the Triple Alliance on October 31, 1861 in which they agreed to take possession of several custom stations within Mexico as payment. A delegation of the Triple Alliance arrived in Veracruz in December 1861. President Juárez immediately sent his Foreign Affairs Minister, Manuel Doblado, who is able to reduce the debts through the Pacto de Soledad (Soledad Pact). General Juan Prim of Spain persuaded the English delegation to accept the terms of the Pacto de Soledad, but the French delegation refused.

The liberal political forces maintained strong control over the state government until shortly after the French Intervention which turned the tables in favor to the conservative forces once again. The intervention had serious repercussions for the state of Chihuahua. President Juárez, in an effort to organize a strong defense against the French, decreed a list of national guard units that every state had to contribute to the Ministry of War and the Navy; Chihuahua was responsible for inducting 2,000 men. Regaining power, Governor Luis Terrazas assigned the First Battalion of Chihuahua for integration into the national army led by General Jesús González Ortega; the battalion was deployed to Puebla. After the defeat of the army in Puebla, the Juárez administration was forced to abandon Mexico City; the president retreated further north seeking refuge in the state of Chihuahua.

Under threat from the conservative forces, Governor Terrazas was deposed, and the state legislature proclaimed martial law in the state in April 1864 and established Jesús José Casavantes as the new governor. In response, José María Patoni decided to march to Chihuahua with presidential support. Meanwhile, Maximilian von Habsburg, a younger brother of the Emperor of Austria, was proclaimed Emperor Maximilian I of Mexico on April 10, 1864 with the backing of Napoleon III and a group of Mexican conservatives. Before President Benito Juárez was forced to flee, Congress granted him an emergency extension of his presidency, which would go into effect in 1865 when his term expired, and last until 1867. At the same time, the state liberals and conservatives compromised to allow the popular Ángel Trías take the governorship; by this time the French forces had taken control over the central portions of the country and were making preparations to invade the northern states.

Overview of military actions

The French forces tried to subdue and capture the liberal government based in Saltillo. On September 21, 1864, José María Patoni and Jesús González Ortega lost against the French forces at the Battle of Estanzuelas; the supreme government led by President Juárez was forced to evacuate the city of Saltillo and relocate to Chihuahua. Juárez stopped in Ciudad Jiménez, Valle de Allende, and Hidalgo de Parral, in turn. He decreed Parral the capital of Mexico from October 2–5, 1864. Perceiving the threat from the advancing French forces, the president continued his evacuation through Santa Rosalía de Camargo, Santa Cruz de Rosales, and finally Chihuahua, Chihuahua. On October 12, 1864, the people of the state gave President Juárez an overwhelmingly supportive reception, led by Governor Ángel Trías. On October 15, 1864 the city of Chihuahua was declared the temporary capital of Mexico.

After running imperial military affairs in the states of Coahuila and Durango, General Agustín Enrique Brincourt made preparations to invade the state of Chihuahua. On July 8, 1865 Brincourt crossed the Nazas River in northern Durango, heading toward Chihuahua. On July 22 Brincourt crossed the banks of Río Florido into Ciudad Jiménez; one day later he arrived at Valle de Allende where he sent Colonel Pyot with a garrison to take control of Hidalgo del Parral. Brincourt continued through Santa Rosalía de Camargo and Santa Cruz de Rosales. President Juárez remained in the state capital until August 5, 1865 when he left for El Paso del Norte (present-day Ciudad Juárez) due to evidence that the French were to attack the city. On the same day, the President named General Manuel Ojinaga the new governor and placed him in charge of all the republican forces. Meanwhile, General Villagran surprised the imperial forces in control of Hidalgo de Parral; after a short two-hour battle, Colonel Pyot was defeated and forced to retreat. At the Battle of Parral, the French lost 55 men to the Republican forces. On August 13, 1865, the French forces with an estimated 2,500 men arrived at the outskirts of Chihuahua City, and on August 15, 1865, General Brincourt defeated the republican forces, taking control of the state capital. Brincourt designated Tomás Zuloaga as Prefect of Chihuahua. Fearing the French would continue their campaign to El Paso del Norte, President Juárez relocated to El Carrizal, a secluded place in the mountains near El Paso del Norte, in August 1865, . It would have been easy for the French forces to continue in pursuit of President Juárez across the border, but they feared altercations with American forces. General François Achille Bazaine ordered the French troops to retreat back to the state of Durango after only reaching a point one days travel north of Chihuahua City. General Brincourt asked for 1,000 men to be left behind to help maintain control over the state, but his request was denied. After the death of General Ojinaga, the Republican government declared General Villagran in charge of the fight against the Imperial forces. The French left the state on October 29, 1865. President Juárez returned to Chihuahua City on November 20, 1865 and remained in the city until December 9, 1865 when he returned to El Paso del Norte. Shortly after the president left Chihuahua City, Terrazas was restored as governor of the state on December 11, 1865.

Maximilian was deeply dissatisfied with General Bazaine's decision to abandon the state capital of Chihuahua and immediately ordered Agustín B. Billaut to recapture the city. On December 11, 1865, Billaut with a force of 500 men took control of the city. By January 31, 1866 Billaut was ordered to leave Chihuahua, but he left behind 500 men to maintain control. At the zenith of their power, the imperialist forces controlled all but four states in Mexico; the only states to maintain strong opposition to the French were: Guerrero, Chihuahua, Sonora, and Baja California.

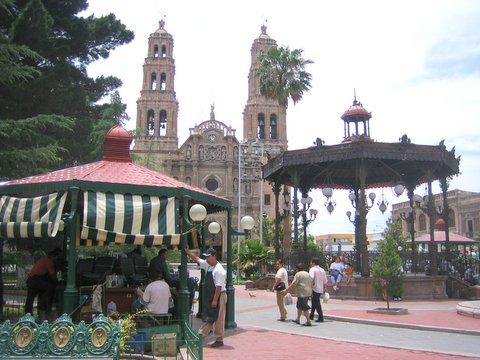
The Plaza de Armas and the Cathedral of the Holy Cross, Our Lady of Regla and St Francis of Assisi

President Juárez once again based his government in the state of Chihuahua and it served as the center for the resistance against the French invasion throughout Mexico. On March 25, 1866, a battle ensued in the Plaza de Armas in the center of Chihuahua City between the French imperial forces that were guarding the plaza and the Republican forces led by General Terrazas. Being completely caught off guard, the French imperial forces sought refuge by bunkering themselves in the Cathedral of the Holy Cross, Our Lady of Regla, and St Francis of Assisi and made it almost impossible to penetrate their defenses. General Terrazas then decided to fire a heavy artillery barrage with 8 kg cannonballs. The first cannon fired hit a bell in the tower of the church, instantly breaking it in half; soon after, 200 men of the imperial army forces surrendered. The republican forces had recovered control over the state capital. The bell in the church was declared a historical monument and can be seen today in the Cathedral. By April 1866, the state government had established a vital trading route from Chihuahua City to San Antonio, Texas; the government began to replenish their supplies and reinforce their fight against the Imperial forces.

General Aguirre moved to the deserts of the southeastern portion of the state and defeated the French forces in Parral, led by Colonel Cottret. By the middle of 1866, the state of Chihuahua was declared free of enemy control; Parral was the last French stronghold within the state. On June 17, 1866, President Juárez arrived in Chihuahua City and remained in the capital until December 10, 1866. During his two years in the state of Chihuahua, President Juárez passed ordinances regarding the rights of adjudication of property and nationalized the property of the clergy. The distance of the French forces and their allies allowed the Ministry of War, led by General Negrete, to reorganize the state's national guard into the Patriotic Battalion of Chihuahua, which was deployed to fight in the battle of Matamoros, Tamaulipas against the French. After a series of major defeats and an escalating threat from Prussia, France began pulling troops out of Mexico in late 1866. Disillusioned with the liberal political views of Maximilian, the Mexican conservatives abandoned him, and in 1867 the last of the Emperor's forces were defeated. Maximilian was sentenced to death by a military court; despite national and international pleas for amnesty, Juárez refused to commute the sentence. Maximilian was executed by firing squad on June 19, 1867.

=== Juárez Government ===
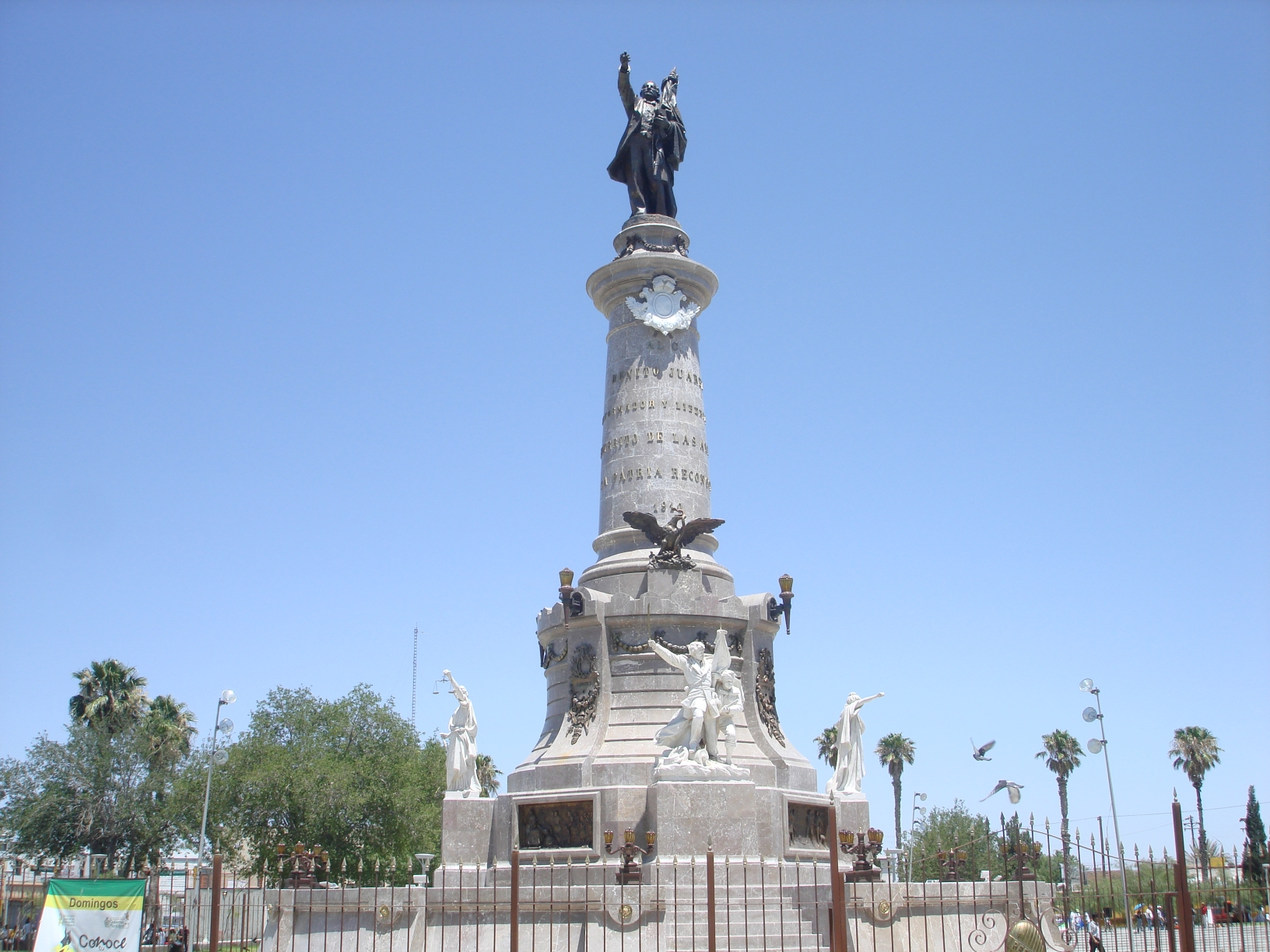
Monument to Benito Juárez in Ciudad Juárez, Chihuahua

President Benito Juárez was re-elected in the general election of 1867 in which he received strong liberal support, especially in Chihuahua. Luis Terrazas was confirmed by the people of Chihuahua to be governor of the state. But soon after the election, President Juárez had another crisis on his hands; the Juárez administration was suspected to be involved in the assassination of the military chief José María Patoni executed by General Canto in August 1868. General Canto turned himself over to Donato Guerra. Canto was sentenced to death, but later his sentence changed to 10 years imprisonment. The sense of injustice gave rise to a new rebellion in 1869 that threatened the federal government. In response, the Juárez administration took drastic measures by temporarily suspending constitutional rights, but the governor of Chihuahua did not support this action. Hostilities continued to increase especially after the election of 1871 which was perceived to be fraudulent. A new popular leader arose among the rebels, Porfirio Díaz. The federal government was successful in quelling rebellions in Durango and Chihuahua. On July 18, 1872, President Juárez died from a heart attack; soon after, many of his supporters ceased the fighting. Peace returned to Chihuahua and the new government was led by Governor Antonio Ochoa (formerly a co-owner of the Batopilas silver mines) in 1873 after Luis Terrazas finished his term in 1872.

But the peace in the state did not last long, the elections of 1875 caused new hostilities. Ángel Trías led a new movement against the government in June 1875 and maintained control over the government until September 18, 1875 when Donato Guerra the orchestrator of the Revolution of the North was captured. Donato Guerra was assassinated in a suburb of Chihuahua City where he was incarcerated for conspiring with Ángel Trías. During October 1875 several locations were controlled by rebel forces, but the government finally regained control on November 25, 1875.

=== Porfiriato ===
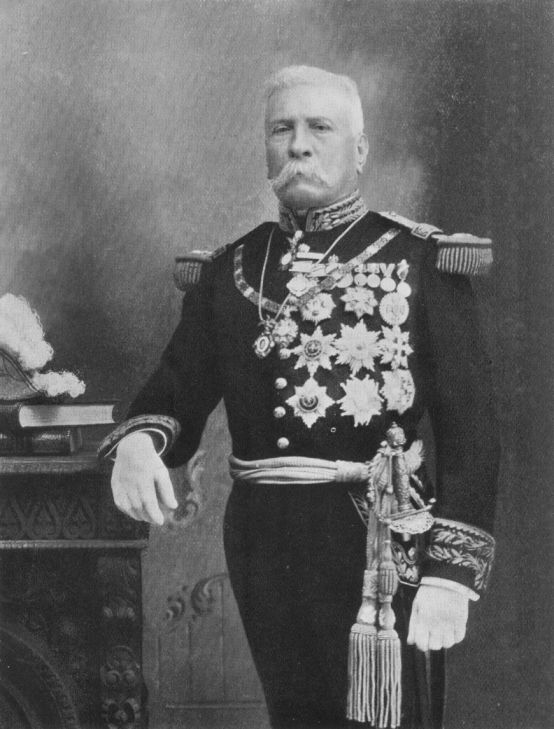
Porfirio Díaz in military uniform

After the death of the president Benito Juárez in 1872, the first magistracy of the country was occupied by the vice-president Sebastián Lerdo de Tejada, who called for new elections. Two candidates were registered; Lerdo de Tejada and General Porfirio Díaz, one of the heroes of the Battle of Puebla which had taken place on May 5, 1862. Lerdeo de Tejada won the election, but lost popularity after he announced his intent to run for re-election. On March 21, 1876, Don Porfirio Díaz rebelled against President Sebastián Lerdo de Tejada. The Plan of Tuxtepec defended the "No Re-election" principle. On June 2, 1876 the garrisons in the state of Chihuahua surrendered to the authority of General Porfirio Díaz; Governor Antonio Ochoa was arrested until all the Lerdista forces were suppressed throughout the state. Porfirio Díaz then helped Trías regain the governorship of the state of Chihuahua allowing for the Plan of Tuxtepec to be implemented. The victory of the Plan of Tuxtepec, gave the interim presidency to José María Iglesias and later, as the only candidate, the General Porfirio Díaz assumed the presidency on May 5, 1877.

During the first years of the Porfiriato (Porfirio Díaz Era), the Díaz administration had to combat several attacks from the Lerdista forces and the Apache. A new rebellion led by the Lerdista party was orchestrated from exile in the United States. The Lerdista forces were able to temporarily occupy the city of El Paso del Norte until mid-1877. During 1877 the northern parts of the state suffered through a spell of extreme drought which were responsible for many deaths in El Paso del Norte.

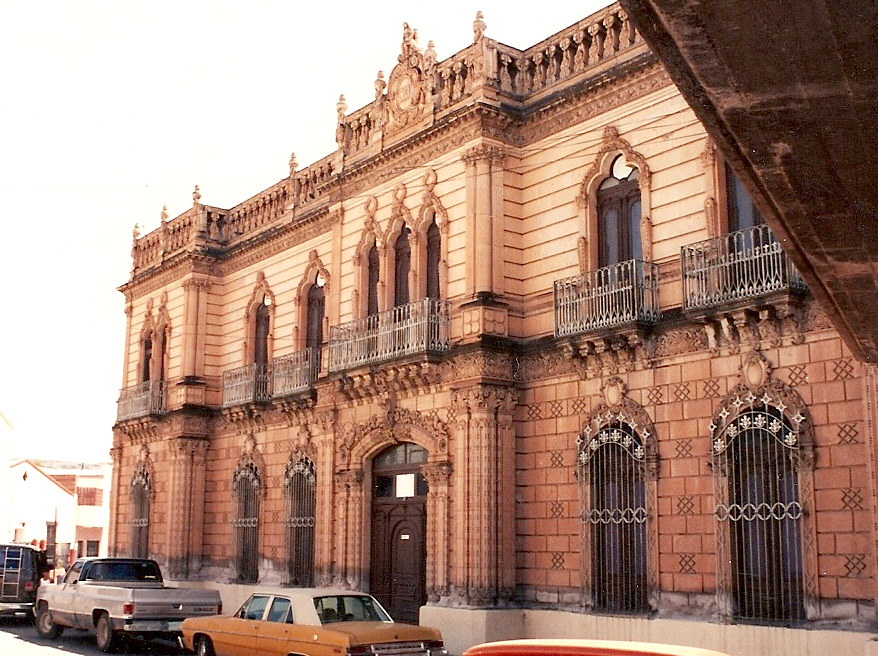
Palacio de Alvarado is the house of Pedro Alvarado Torres, one of the richest silver barons of Mexico during the Porfiriato.

The officials in Mexico City reduced the price of corn from six cents to two cents a pound. The northern portion of the state continued to decline economically which led to another revolt led by G. Casavantes in August 1879; Governor Trías was accused of misappropriation of funds and inefficient administration of the state. Casavantes took the state capital and occupied it briefly; he was also successful in forcing Governor Trías to exile. Shortly afterwards, the federal government sent an entourage led by Treviño; Casavantes was immediately ordered to resign his position. Casavantes declared political victory as he was able to publicly accuse and depose Governor Trías. At the same time the states of Durango and Coahuila had a military confrontation over territorial claims and water rights; this altercation between the state required additional federal troops to stabilize the area. Later a dispute ensued again among the states of Coahuila, Durango, and Chihuahua over the mountain range area known as Sierra Mojada, when large deposits of gold ore was discovered. The state of Chihuahua officially submitted a declaration of protest in May 1880 that shortly after was amicably settled. Despite the difficulties at the beginning, Díaz was able to secure and stabilize the state, which earned the confidence and support of the people.

During the 1880s, the Díaz administration consolidated several government agencies throughout Mexico to control credit and currency by the creation of the Institution of Credit and Currency. Because Díaz had created such an effective centralized government, he was able to concentrate decision making and maintain control over the economic instability.

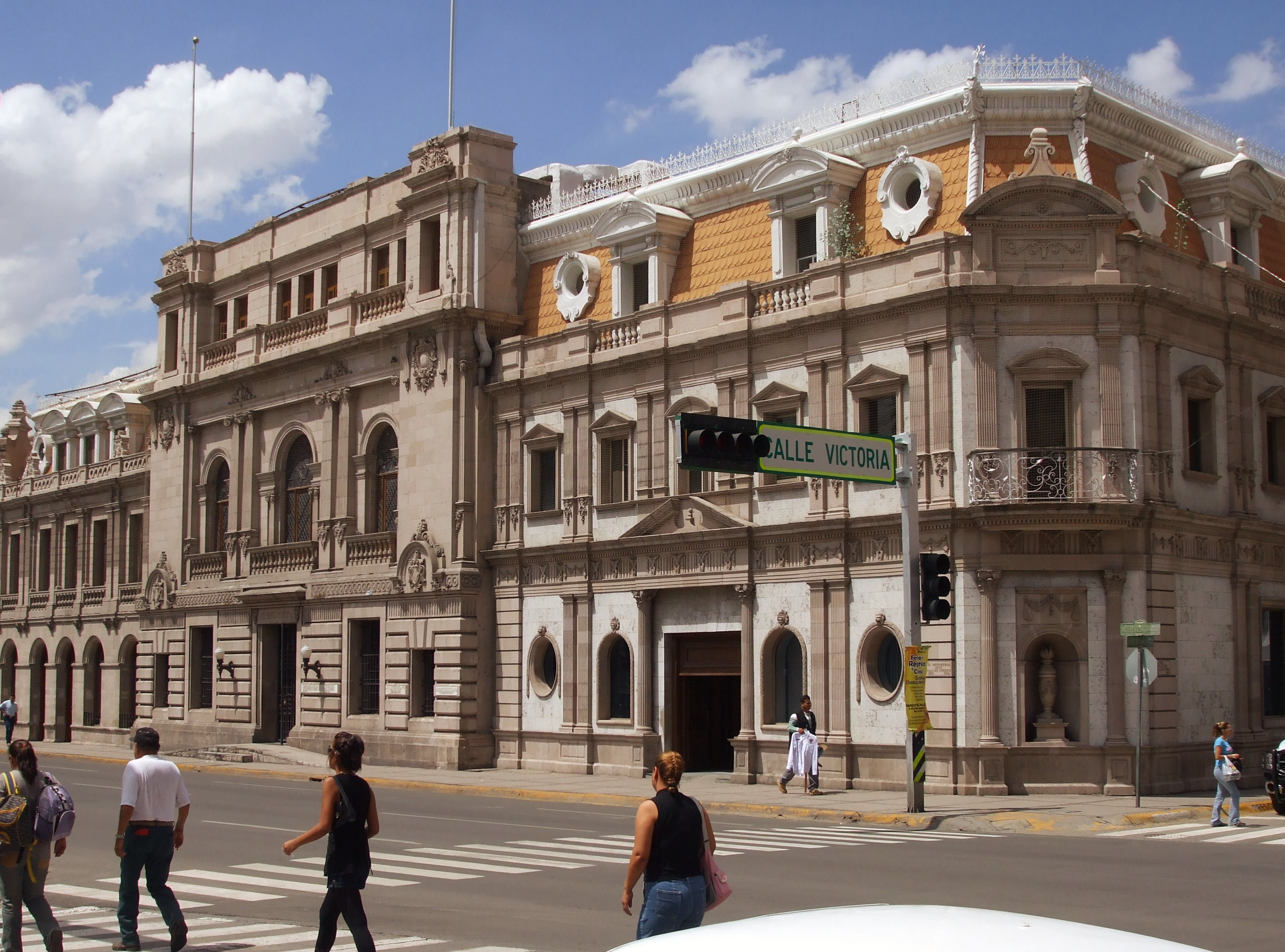
The City Hall of Chihuahua is an example of the neoclassical architecture that was erected during the presidency of Porfirio Díaz.

The Díaz administration made political decisions and took legal measures that allowed the elite throughout Mexico to concentrate the nation's wealth by favoring monopolies. During this time, two-fifths of the state's territory was divided among 17 rich families which owned practically all of the arable land in Chihuahua. The state economy grew at a rapid pace during the Porfiriato; the economy in Chihuahua was dominated by agriculture and mining. The Díaz administration helped Governor Luis Terrazas by funding the Municipal Public Library in Chihuahua City and passing a federal initiative for the construction of the railroad from Chihuahua City to Ciudad Júarez. By 1881, the Central Mexican Railroad was completed which connected Mexico City to Ciudad Juárez. In 1883 telephone lines were installed throughout the state, allowing communication between Chihuahua City and Aldama. By 1888 the telephone services were extended from the capital to the cities of Julimes, Meoqui, and Hidalgo del Parral; the telecommunication network in the state covered an estimated 3,500 kilometers. The need of laborers to construct the extensive infrastructure projects resulted in a significant Asian immigration, mostly from China. Asian immigrants soon become integral to the state economy by opening restaurants, small grocery stores, and hotels. By the end of the Terrazas term, the state experienced an increase in commerce, mining, and banking. When the banks were nationalized, Chihuahua became the most important banking state in Mexico.

Under Governor Miguel Ahumada, the education system in the state was unified and brought under tighter control by the state government, and the metric system was standardized throughout the state to replace the colonial system of weights and measures. On September 16, 1897, the Civilian Hospital of Chihuahua was inaugurated in Chihuahua City and became known among the best in the country. In 1901 the Heroes Theater (Teatro de los Héroes) opened in Chihuahua City. On August 18, 1904, Governor Terrazas was replaced by Governor Enrique C. Creel. From 1907 to 1911, the Creel administration succeeded in advancing the state's legal system, modernizing the mining industry, and raising public education standards. In 1908 the Chihuahuan State Penitentiary was built, and the construction on the first large scale dam project was initiated on the Chuviscar River. During the same time, the streets of Chihuahua City were paved and numerous monuments were built in Chihuahua City and Ciudad Juárez.

=== Mexican Revolution ===
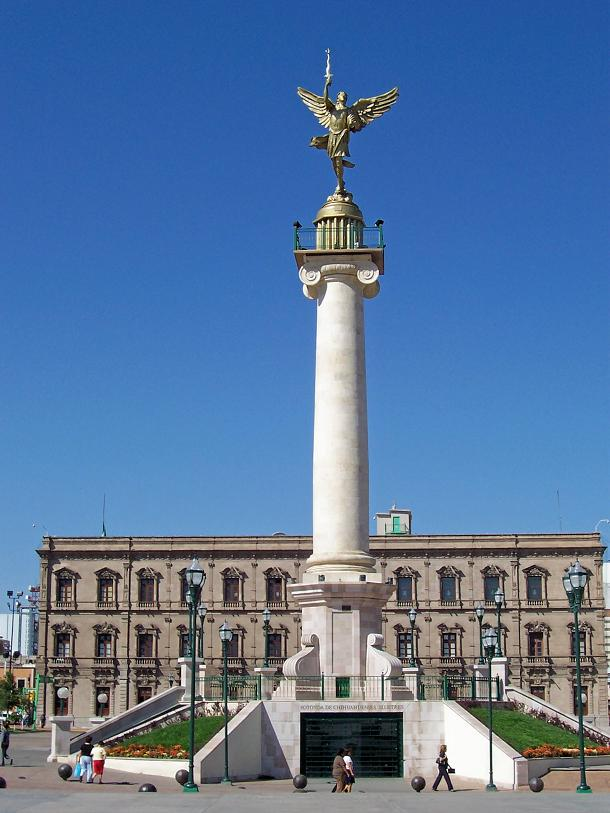
The government palace built during the early 20th century now a museum.

Díaz created an effective centralized government that helped concentrate wealth and political power among the elite upper class, mostly criollo. The economy was characterized by the construction of factories, roads, dams, and better farms. The Díaz administration passed new land laws that virtually unraveled all the rights previously recognized and the land reforms passed by President Benito Juárez. No peasant or farmer could claim the land he occupied without formal legal title.

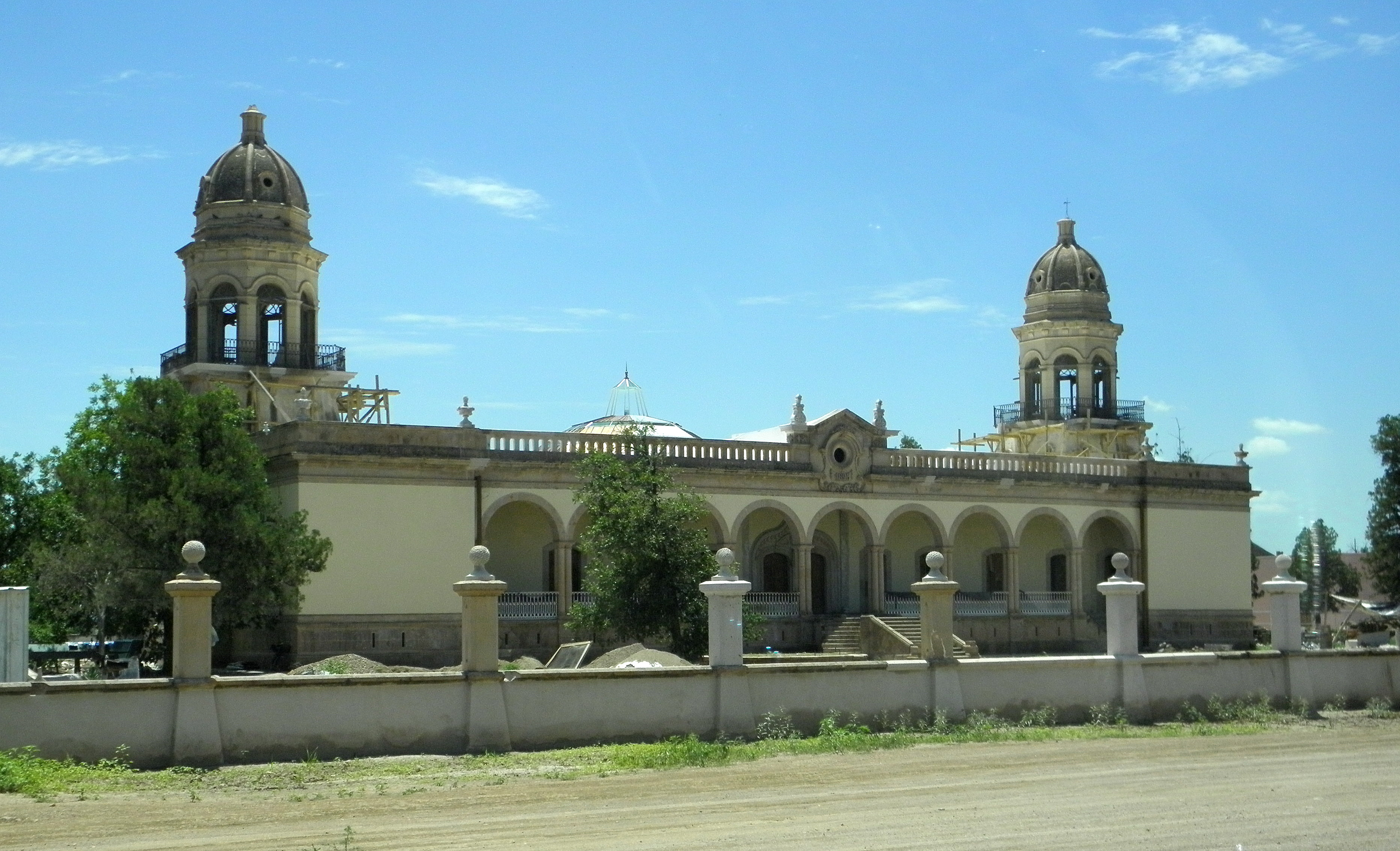
Quinta Carolina is an hacienda owned by the Terrazas family.

A handful of families owned large estates (known as haciendas) and controlled the greater part of the land across the state while the vast majority of Chihuahuans were landless. The state economy was largely defined by ranching and mining. At the expense of the working class, the Díaz administration promoted economic growth by encouraging investment from foreign companies from the United Kingdom, France, Imperial Germany and the United States. The proletariat was often exploited, and found no legal protection or political recourse to redress injustices.

Despite the internal stability (known as the paz porfiriana), modernization, and economic growth in Mexico during the Porfiriato from 1876 to 1910, many across the state became deeply dissatisfied with the political system. When Díaz first ran for office, he committed to a strict "No Re-election" policy in which he disqualified himself to serve consecutive terms. Eventually backtracking on many of his initial political positions Díaz became a de facto dictator. Díaz became increasingly unpopular due to brutal suppression of political dissidents by using the Rurales and manipulating the elections to solidify his political machine. The working class was frustrated with the Díaz regime due to the corruption of the political system that had increased the inequality between the rich and poor. The peasants felt disenfranchised by the policies that promoted the unfair distribution of land where 95% of the land was owned by the top 5%.

The end of the Porfiriato came in 1910 with the beginning of the Mexican Revolution. Díaz had stated that Mexico was ready for democracy and he would step down to allow other candidates to compete for the presidency, but Díaz decided to run again in 1910 for the last time against Francisco I. Madero. During the campaign Díaz incarcerated Madero on election day in 1910. Díaz was announced the winner of the election by a landslide, triggering the revolution. Madero supporter Toribio Ortega took up arms with a group of followers at Cuchillo Parado, Chihuahua on November 10, 1910.

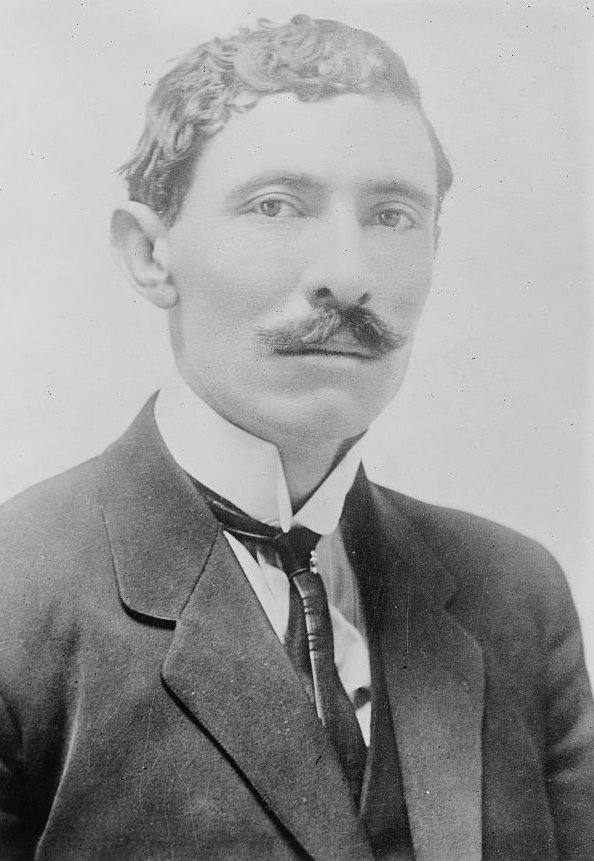
Pascual Orozco

In response to Madero's letter to action, Pascual Orozco (a wealthy mining baron) and Chihuahua Governor Abraham González formed a powerful military union in the north, taking military control of several northern Mexican cities with other revolutionary leaders, including Pancho Villa. Against Madero's wishes, Orozco and Villa fought for and won Ciudad Juárez. After militias loyal to Madero defeated the Mexican federal army, on May 21, 1911, Madero signed the Treaty of Ciudad Juárez with Díaz. It required that Díaz abdicate his rule and be replaced by Madero. Insisting on a new election, Madero won overwhelmingly in late 1911, and he established a liberal democracy and received support from the United States and popular leaders such as Orozco and Villa. Orozco eventually became disappointed with the Madero's government and led a rebellion against him. He organized his own army, called "Orozquistas"—also called the Colorados ("Red Flaggers")—after Madero refused to agree to social reforms calling for better working hours, pay and conditions. The rural working class, which had supported Madero, now took up arms against him in support of Orozco.

In March 1912, in Chihuahua, Gen. Pascual Orozco revolted. Immediately President Francisco Madero commanded Gen. Victoriano Huerta of the Federal Army, to put down the Orozco revolt. The governor of Chihuahua mobilized the state militia led by Colonel Pancho Villa to supplement General Huerta. By June, Villa notified Huerta that the Orozco revolt had been put down and that the militia would consider themselves no longer under Huerta's command and would depart. Huerta became furious and ordered that Villa be executed. Raúl Madero, Madero's brother, intervened to save Villa's life. Jailed in Mexico City, Villa fled to the United States. Madero's time as leader was short-lived, ended by a coup d'état in 1913 led by Gen. Victoriano Huerta; Orozco sided with Huerta, and Huerta made him one of his generals.

On March 26, 1913, Venustiano Carranza issued the Plan de Guadalupe, which refused to recognize Huerta as president and called for war between the two factions. Soon after the assassination of President Madero, Carranza returned to Mexico to fight Huerta, but with only a handful of comrades. However, by 1913 his forces had swelled into an army of thousands, called the División del Norte (Northern Division). Villa and his army, along with Emiliano Zapata and Álvaro Obregón, united with Carranza to fight against Huerta. In March 1914 Carranza traveled to Ciudad Juárez, which served as rebellion's capital for the remainder of the struggle with Huerta. In April 1914 U.S. opposition to Huerta had reached its peak, blockading the regime's ability to resupply from abroad. Carranza trying to keep his nationalistic credentials threatened war with the United States. In his spontaneous response to U.S. President Woodrow Wilson Carranza asked "that the president withdraw American troops from Mexico."

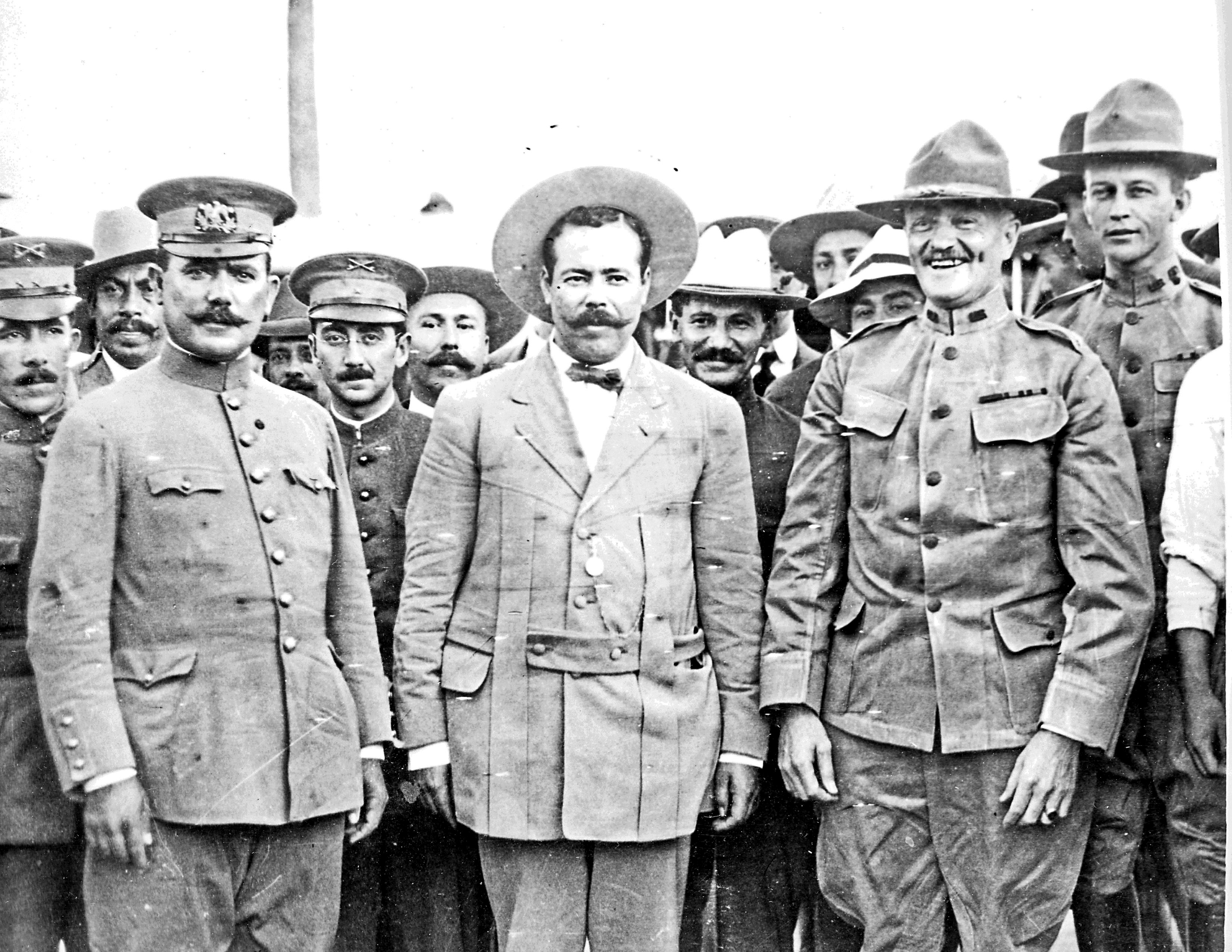
Generals Obregón, Villa and Pershing pose after meeting at Ft. Bliss, Texas (Immediately behind Gen. Pershing is his aide, 1st Lt. George S. Patton Jr.).

The situation became so tense that war with the United States seemed imminent. On April 22, 1914, on the initiative of Felix A. Sommerfeld and Sherburne Hopkins, Pancho Villa traveled to Juárez to calm fears along the border and asked President Wilson's emissary George Carothers to tell "Señor Wilson" that he had no problems with the American occupation of Veracruz. Carothers wrote to Secretary William Jennings Bryan: "As far as he was concerned we could keep Vera Cruz [sic] and hold it so tight that not even water could get in to Huerta and . . . he could not feel any resentment". Whether trying to please the U.S. government or through the diplomatic efforts of Sommerfeld and Carothers, or maybe as a result of both, Villa stepped out from under Carranza's stated foreign policy.

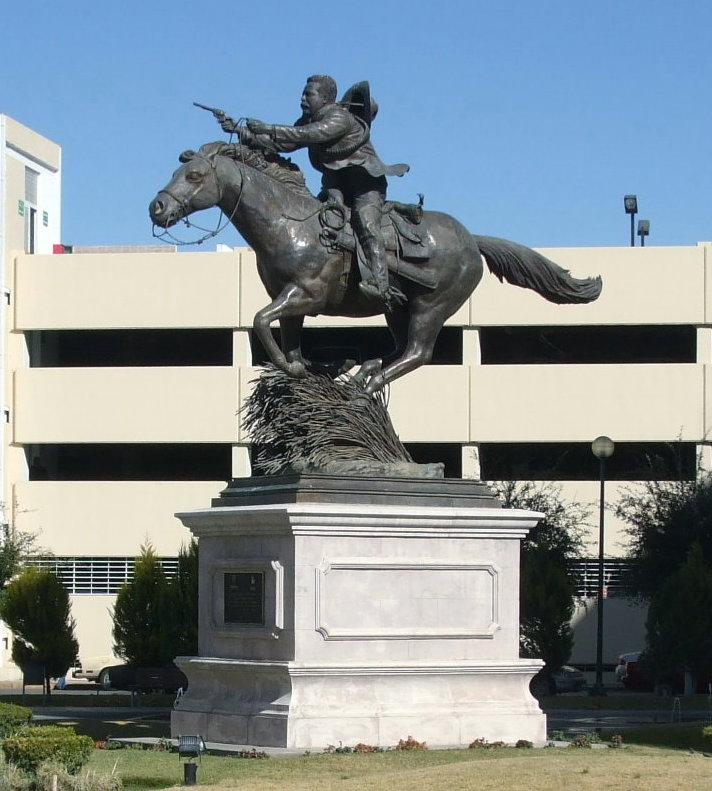
Bronze statue of Villa in Chihuahua, Chihuahua

The uneasy alliance of Carranza, Obregón, Villa, and Zapata eventually led the rebels to victory. The fight against Huerta formally ended on August 15, 1914, when Álvaro Obregón signed a number of treaties in Teoloyucan in which the last of Huerta's forces surrendered to him and recognized the constitutional government. On August 20, 1914, Carranza made a triumphal entry into Mexico City. Carranza (supported by Obregón) was now the strongest candidate to fill the power vacuum and set himself up as head of the new government. This government successfully printed money, passed laws, etc.

Villa and Carranza had different political goals causing Villa to become an enemy of Carranza. After Carranza took control in 1914, Villa and other revolutionaries who opposed him met at what was called the Convention of Aguascalientes. The convention deposed Carranza in favor of Eulalio Gutiérrez. In the winter of 1914 Villa's and Zapata's troops entered and occupied Mexico City. Villa was forced from the city in early 1915 and attacked the forces of Gen. Obregón at the Battle of Celaya and was badly defeated in the bloodiest battle of the revolution, with thousands dead. With the defeat of Villa, Carranza seized power. A short time later the United States recognized Carranza as president of Mexico. Even though Villa's forces were badly depleted by his loss at Celaya, he continued his fight against the Carranza government. Finally, in 1920, Obregón—who had defeated him at Celaya—finally reached an agreement with Villa end his rebellion.

Public opinion pressured the U.S. government to bring Villa to justice for the raid on Columbus, New Mexico; U.S. President Wilson sent Gen. John J. Pershing and some 5,000 troops into Mexico in an unsuccessful attempt to capture Villa. It was known as the Punitive Expedition. After nearly a year of pursuing Villa, American forces returned to the United States. The American intervention had been limited to the western sierras of Chihuahua. Villa had the advantage of intimately knowing the inhospitable terrain of the Sonoran Desert and the almost impassable Sierra Madre mountains and always managed to stay one step ahead of his pursuers. In 1923 Villa was assassinated by a group of seven gunmen who ambushed him while he was sitting in the back seat of his car in Parral.

=== Modern ===
On February 6, 2010, former Governor José Reyes Baeza proposed to move the three State Powers (Executive, Legislative, and Judicial) from Chihuahua to Ciudad Juárez in order to face the insecurity problems in Ciudad Juárez, but that request was rejected by the State Legislature on February 12.

== Geography ==
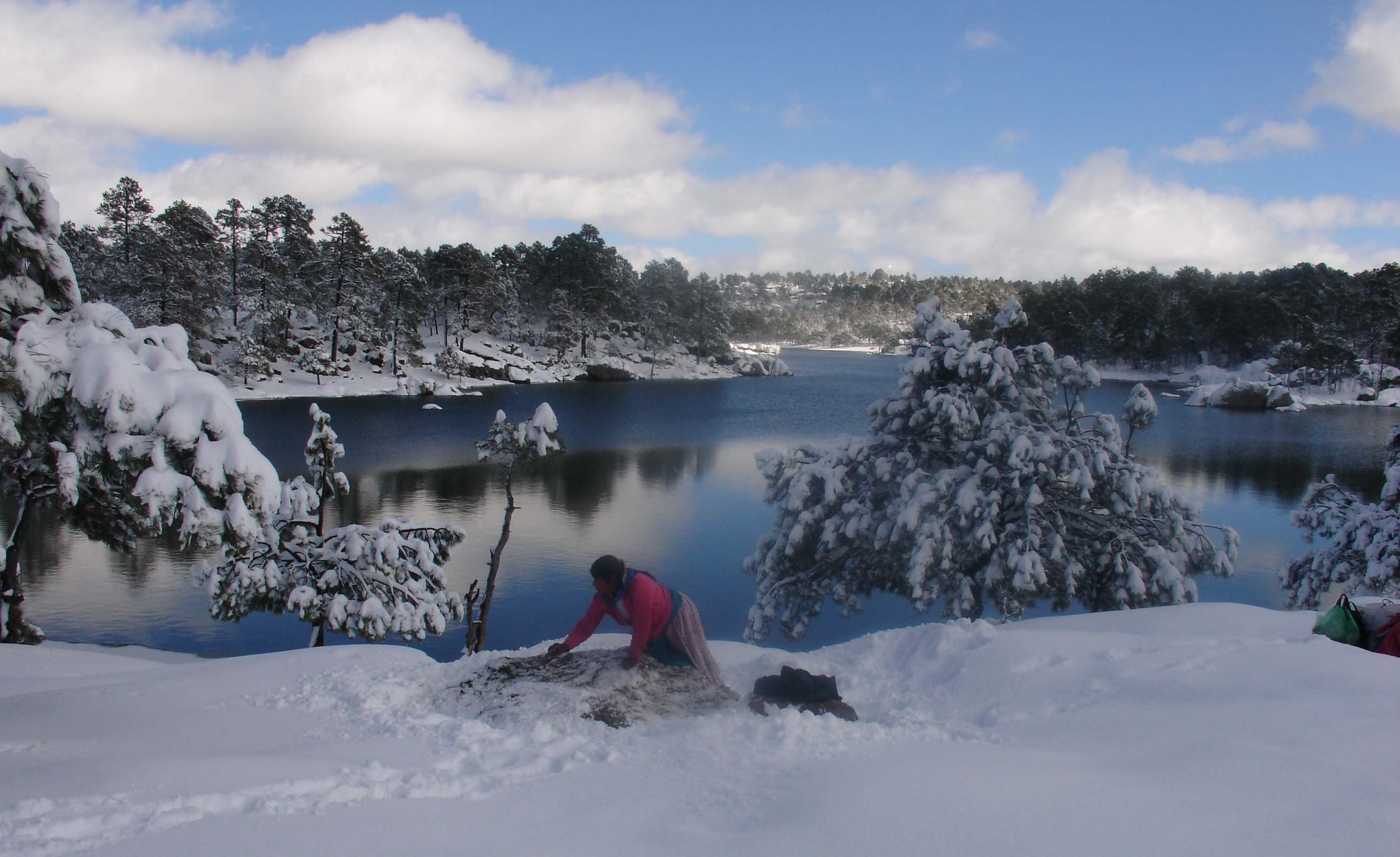
Wintry landscape at Lake Arareco, in the Tarahumara Mountains.

The state of Chihuahua is the largest state in the country and is known as El Estado Grande (The Big State); it accounts for 12.6% of the land of Mexico and is slightly larger than the United Kingdom. The area is landlocked by the states of Sonora to the west, Sinaloa to the south-west, Durango to the south, and Coahuila to the east, and by the U.S. states of Texas to the northeast and New Mexico to the north. The state is made up of three geologic regions: Mountains, Plains-Valleys, and Desert, which occur in large bands from west to east. Because of the different geologic regions there are contrasting climates and ecosystems.

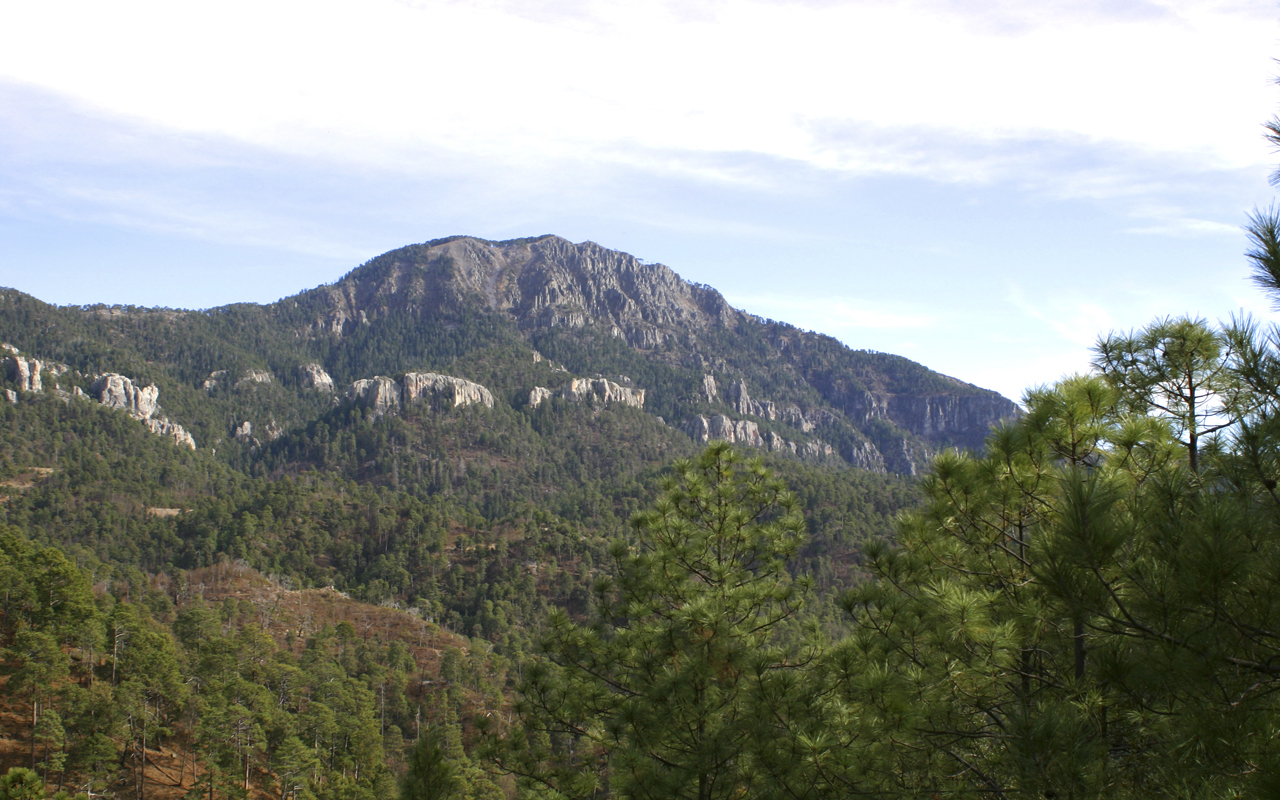
Cerro Mohinora is the highest point in Chihuahua

The main mountain range in the state is the Sierra Madre Occidental reaching a maximum altitude of 10,826 ft (3,300 m) known as Cerro Mohinora. Mountains account for one third of the state's surface area which include large coniferous forests. The climate in the mountainous regions varies. Chihuahua has more forests than any other state in Mexico making the area a bountiful source of wood; the mountainous areas are rich in minerals important to Mexico's mining industry. Precipitation and temperature in the mountainous areas depends on the elevation. Between the months of November and March snow storms are possible in the lower elevations and are frequent in the higher elevations. There are several watersheds located in the Sierra Madre Occidental all of the water that flows through the state; most of the rivers finally empty into the Río Grande. Temperatures in some canyons in the state reach over 100 °F (38 °C) in the summer while the same areas rarely drop below 32 °F (0 °C) in the winter. Microclimates found in the heart of the Sierra Madre Occidental in the state could be considered tropical, and wild tropical plants have been found in some canyons. La Barranca del Cobre, or Copper Canyon, a spectacular canyon system larger and deeper than the Grand Canyon; the canyon also contains Mexico's two tallest waterfalls: Basaseachic Falls and Piedra Volada. There are two national parks found in the mountainous area of the state: Cumbres de Majalca National Park and Basaseachic Falls National Park.

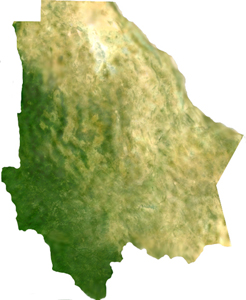
Satellite image of the state of Chihuahua shows the varying terrain from the green alpine mountains in the southwest, to the steppe highlands in the center, to the desert in the east.

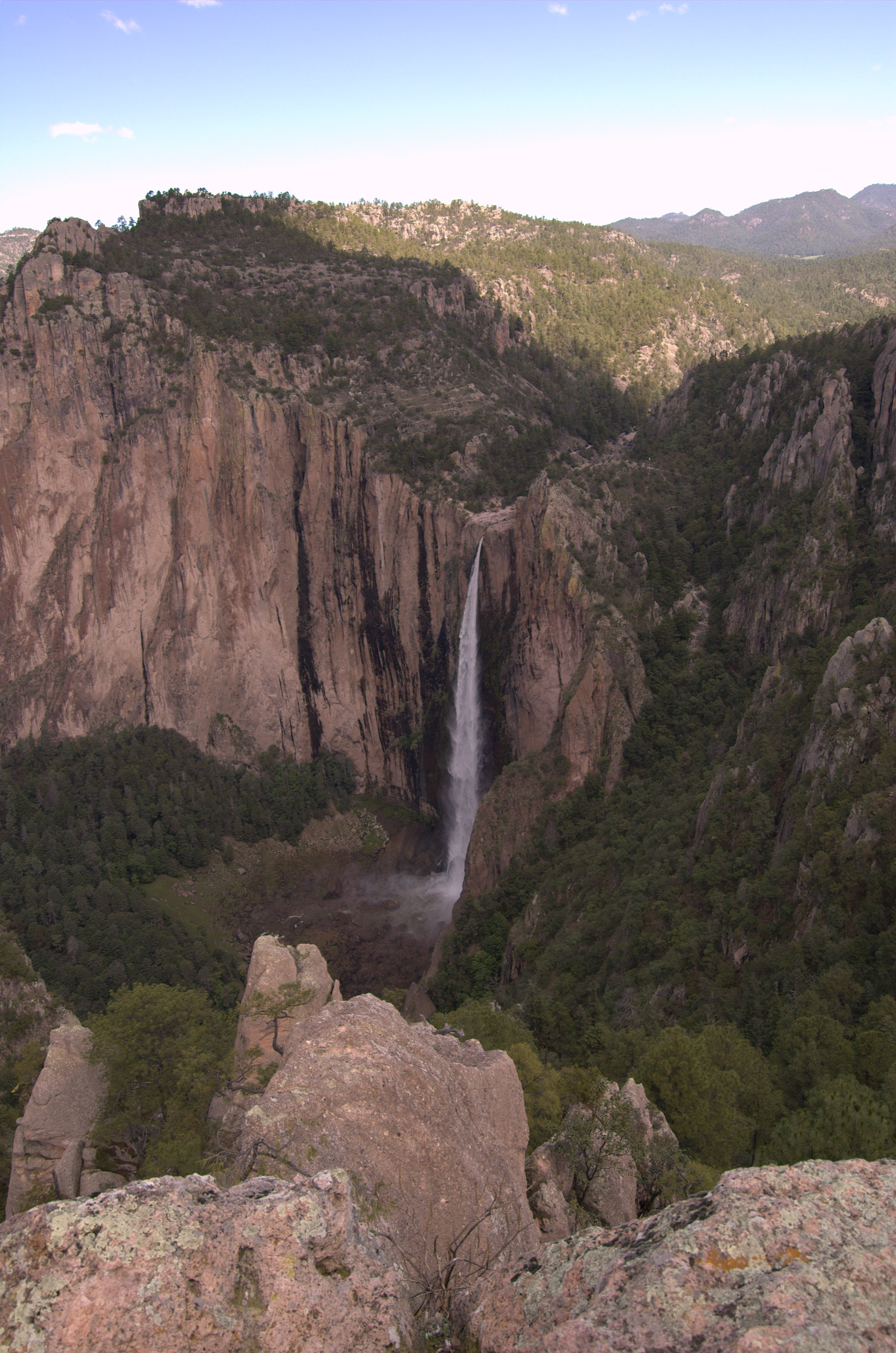
Basaseachic Falls in Copper Canyon.

The plains at the foot of the Sierra Madre Occidental is an elongated mesa known as Altiplanicie Mexicana that exhibits a steppe climate and serves as a transition zone from the mountain climate in the western part of the state to the desert climate in the eastern side of the state. The steppe zone accounts for a third of the state's area, and it experiences pronounced dry and wet seasons. The pronounced rainy season in the steppe is usually observed in the months of July, August, and September. The steppe also encounters extreme temperatures that often reach over 100 °F (38 °C) in the summer and drop below 32 °F (0 °C) in the winter. The steppe zone is an important agriculture zone due to an extensive development of canals exploiting several rivers that flow down from the mountains. The steppe zone is the most populated area of the state.

The most important river in the state is Río Conchos which is the largest tributary to the Río Grande from the Mexican side; the river descends from the zenith of the Sierra Madre Occidental in the southwest part of the state and winds through the center of the state where the water is exploited in the steppe zone and it eventually empties into the Río Grande in the small desert town of Ojinaga.

The desert zone also accounts for about a third of the state's surface area. The Chihuahuan Desert is an international biome that also extends into the neighboring Mexican state of Coahuila and into the U.S. states of Texas and New Mexico. The desert zone is mainly of flat topography with some small mountain ranges that run north to south. The desert in the state varies slightly with a small variant in climate. The lower elevations of the desert zone are found in the north along the Rio Grande which experience hotter temperatures in the summer and winter while the southern portion of the desert zone experiences cooler temperatures due to its higher elevation. The Samalayuca dunes cover an area of about 150 km^{2}; it is an impressive site of the Chihuahuan Desert and is a protected area by the state due to unique species of plants and animals.

=== Climate ===
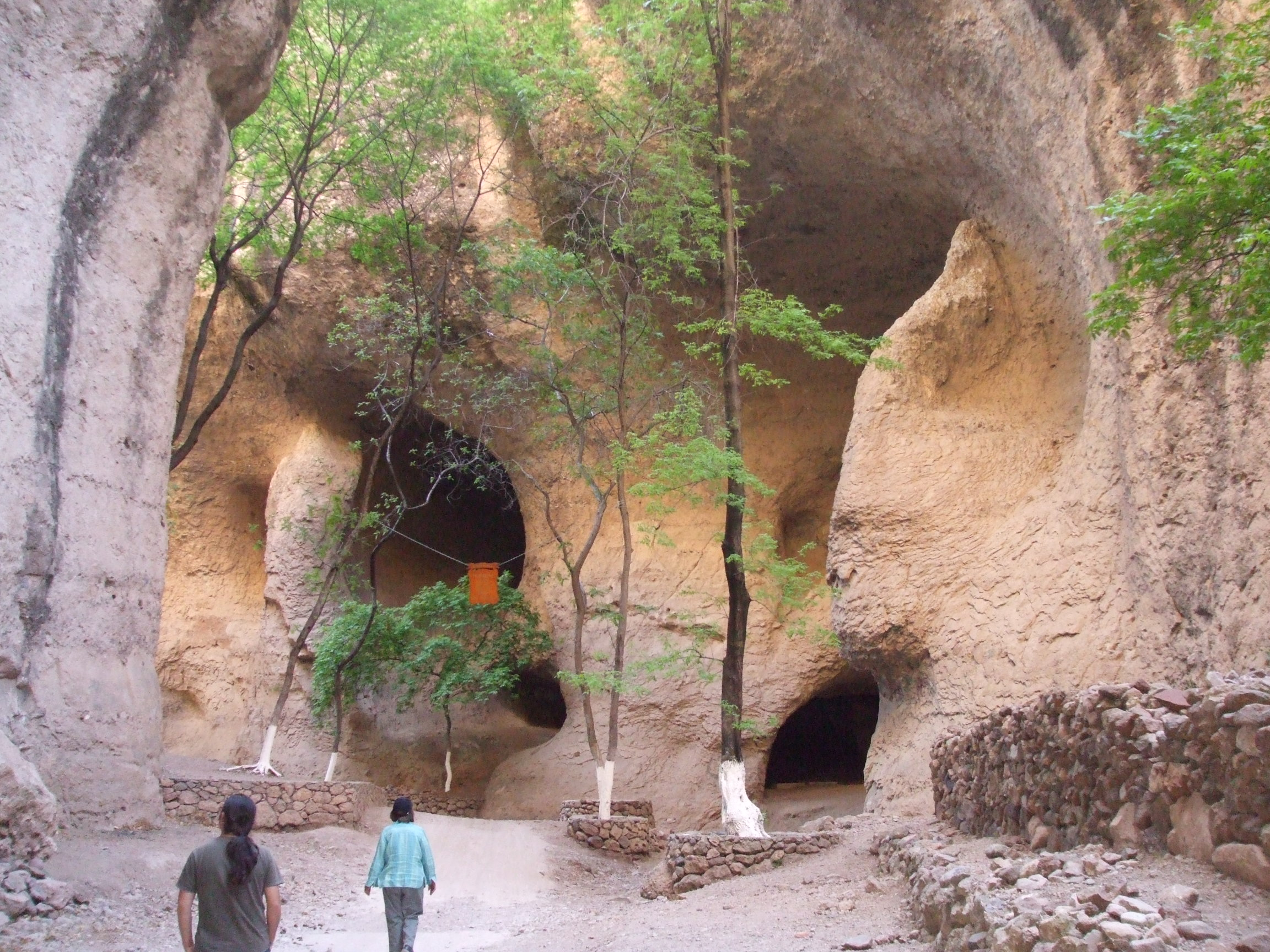
Namúrachi is in the semi-arid zone.

The climate in the state depends mainly in the elevation of the terrain. According to Köppen climate classification the state has five major climate zones. The Sierra Madre Occidental dominates the western part of the state; there are two main climates in this area: Subtropical Highland (Cfb) and Humid Subtropical (Cwa). There are some microclimates in the state due to the varying topology mostly found in the western side of the state. The two best known microclimates are: Tropical savanna climate (Aw) in deep canyons located in the extreme southern part of the state; Continental Mediterranean climate (Dsb) in the extremely high elevations of the Sierra Madre Occidental. Satellite image to the right shows the vegetation is much greener in the west because of the cooler temperatures and larger amounts of precipitation as compared to the rest of the state.

In the far eastern part of the state the Chihuahuan Desert dominates due to low precipitation and extremely high temperatures; some areas of the eastern part of the state are so dry no vegetation is found like the Sand Dunes of Samalayuca. There are two distinctive climate zones found in the eastern part of the state: Hot Desert (BWh) and Cool Desert (BWk) which are differentiated by average annual temperature due to differences in elevation. There is a transition zone in the middle of the state between the two extremely different climates from the east and west; this zone is the Steppe characterized by a compromise between juxtaposed climate zones.

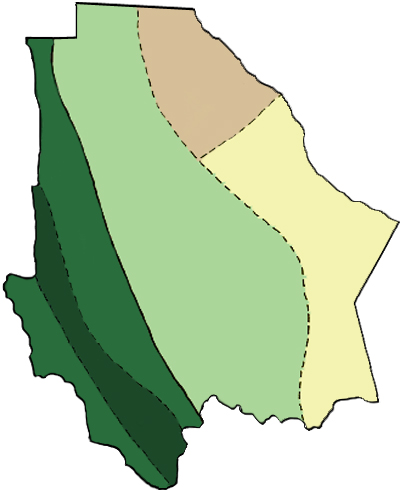
Köppen Climate Zones: Subtropical Highland Cfb Humid Subtropical Cwa Steppe BSk Cool Desert BWk Hot Desert BWh

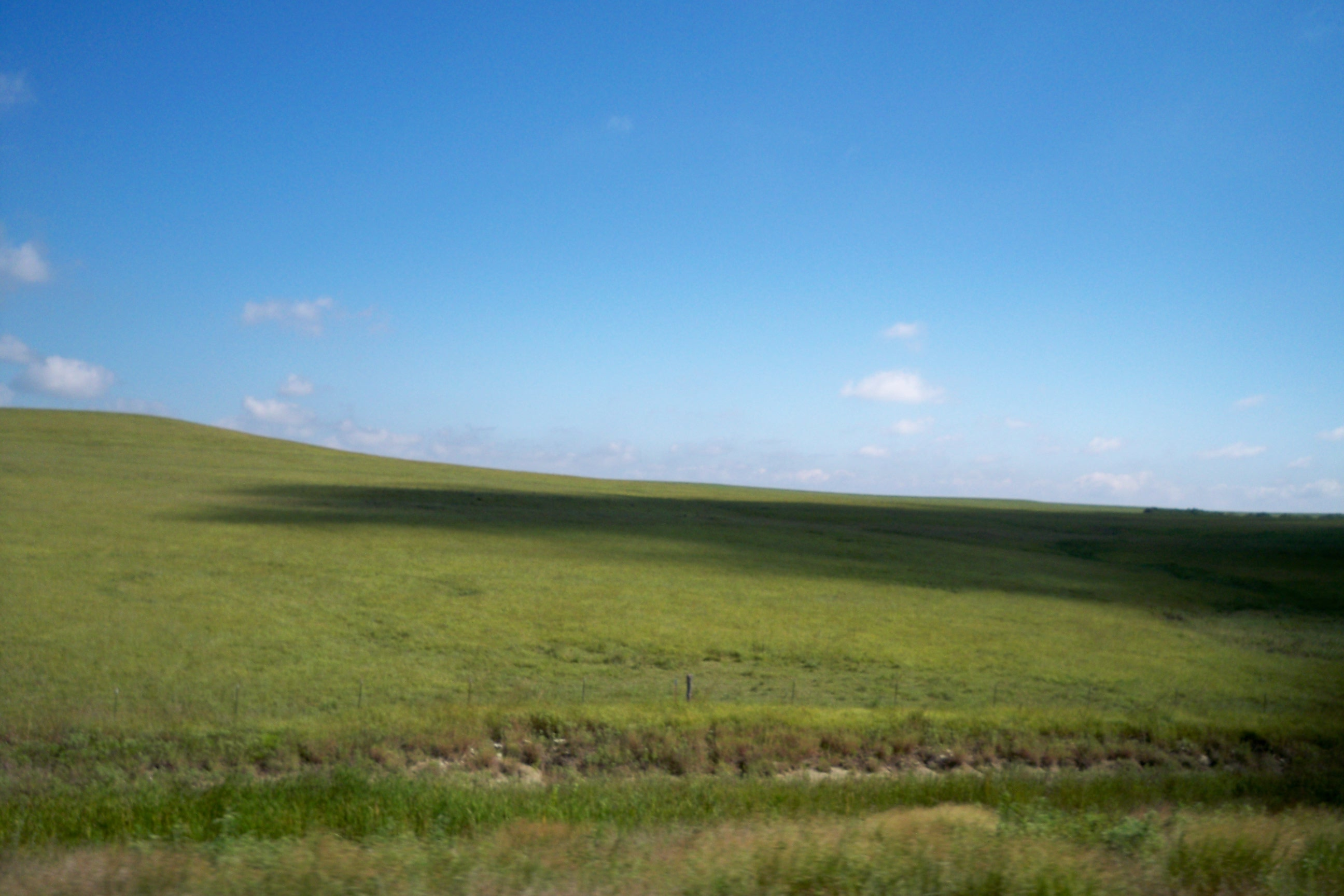
Altiplanicie Mexicana during the monsoon season.

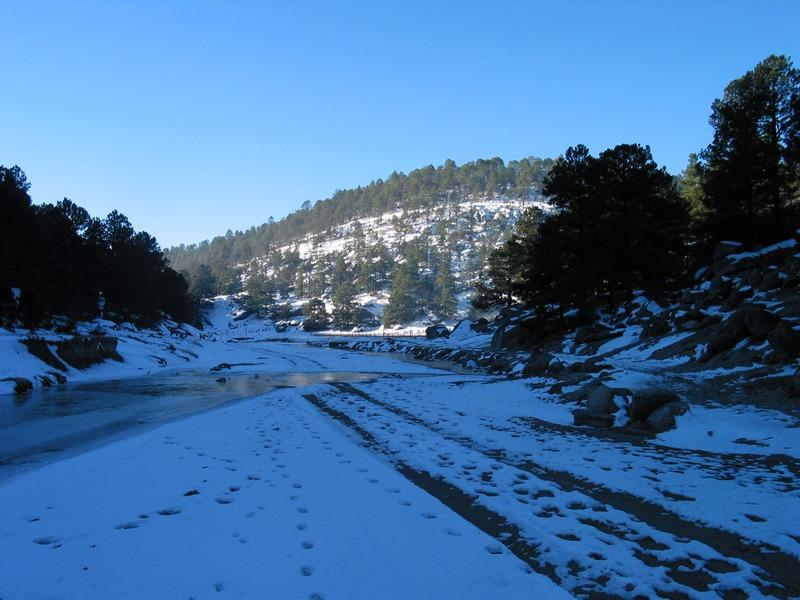
Chihuahua white pines amid snow.

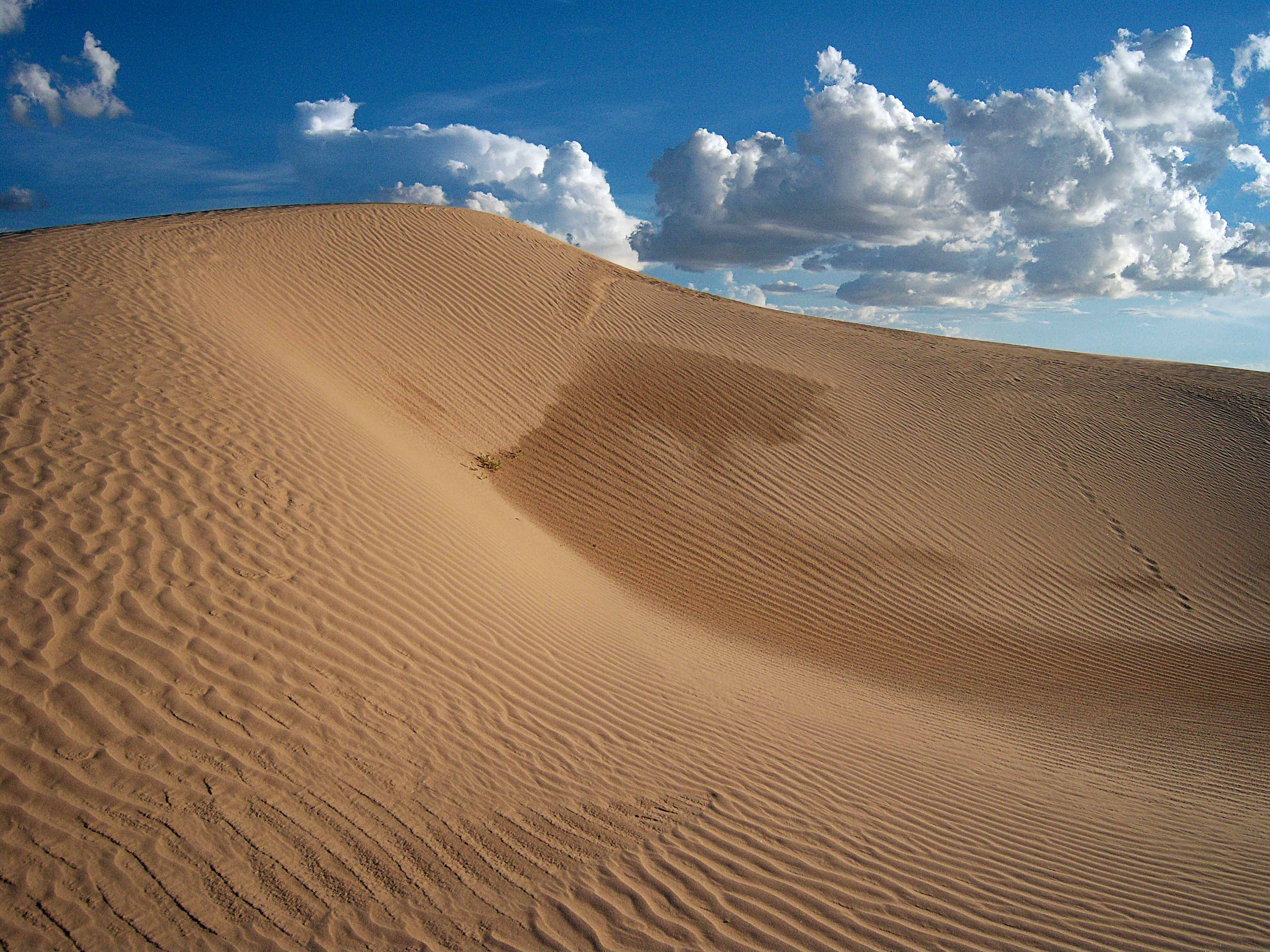
Dunas de Samalayuca a state protected area south of Ciudad Juárez.

- Subtropical Highland (Cfb) most common at elevations above 2,200 m (7,200 ft) above sea level; this climate zone has warm summers reaching a maximum temperature of 28 °C (82.4 °F)and summer lows of 10 °C (50.0 °F). Heavy rainstorms are observed from July to September. Winters are cold reaching a maximum low of −20 °C (−4 °F) and a maximum high of −8 °C (18 °F). During the winter months many snowstorms are observed with typically 1 m (39 in) of snow per season.
- Humid Subtropical (Cwa) climate is most common at elevations between 1,300 to 2,200 m (4,300 to 7,200 ft) above sea level; this climate zone has warm humid summers and an average summer temperature of 20 °C (68 °F). The summer average precipitation is 700 millimetres (28 in), mostly in the months of: July, August, and September. From November to March there are many rainstorms and snowstorms caused by high elevation and prominent cold fronts. Winter temperatures can reach a low of −16 °C (3 °F).
- Semi-arid climate or Steppe (BSk) is most common at elevations between 1,200 to 1,500 m (3,900 to 4,900 ft) above sea level; this climate zone has an annual average of 18 °C (64 °F) and maximum temperatures above 38 °C (100 °F) and lows reaching slightly below 0 °C (32 °F), with a wet season in the late summer and fall. Snowfall is rare but possible in the winter and frost is common from December to March. The annual average rainfall in the steppe climate zone is about 475 millimetres (19 in).
- Hot Desert (BWh) is most common at elevations below 1,200 m (3,900 ft) above sea level; this climate zone tends to have a hot summer at temperatures that often reach 43 °C (109 °F). Winter is warm, rarely dropping below 0 °C (32 °F). Precipitation averages 6–10 in. per year; most of the moisture falls during the monsoon of late summer.
- Cool Desert (BWk) is most common at elevations above 1,200 m (3,900 ft) above sea level; this climate zone tends to have a mild summer, rarely reaching temperatures over 41 °C (106 °F). Winter weather varies from mild to cold depending on northern fronts, often dropping below 0 °C (32 °F). Precipitation averages 10–16 in. per year; most of the moisture falls during the monsoon of late summer.

=== Flora and fauna ===
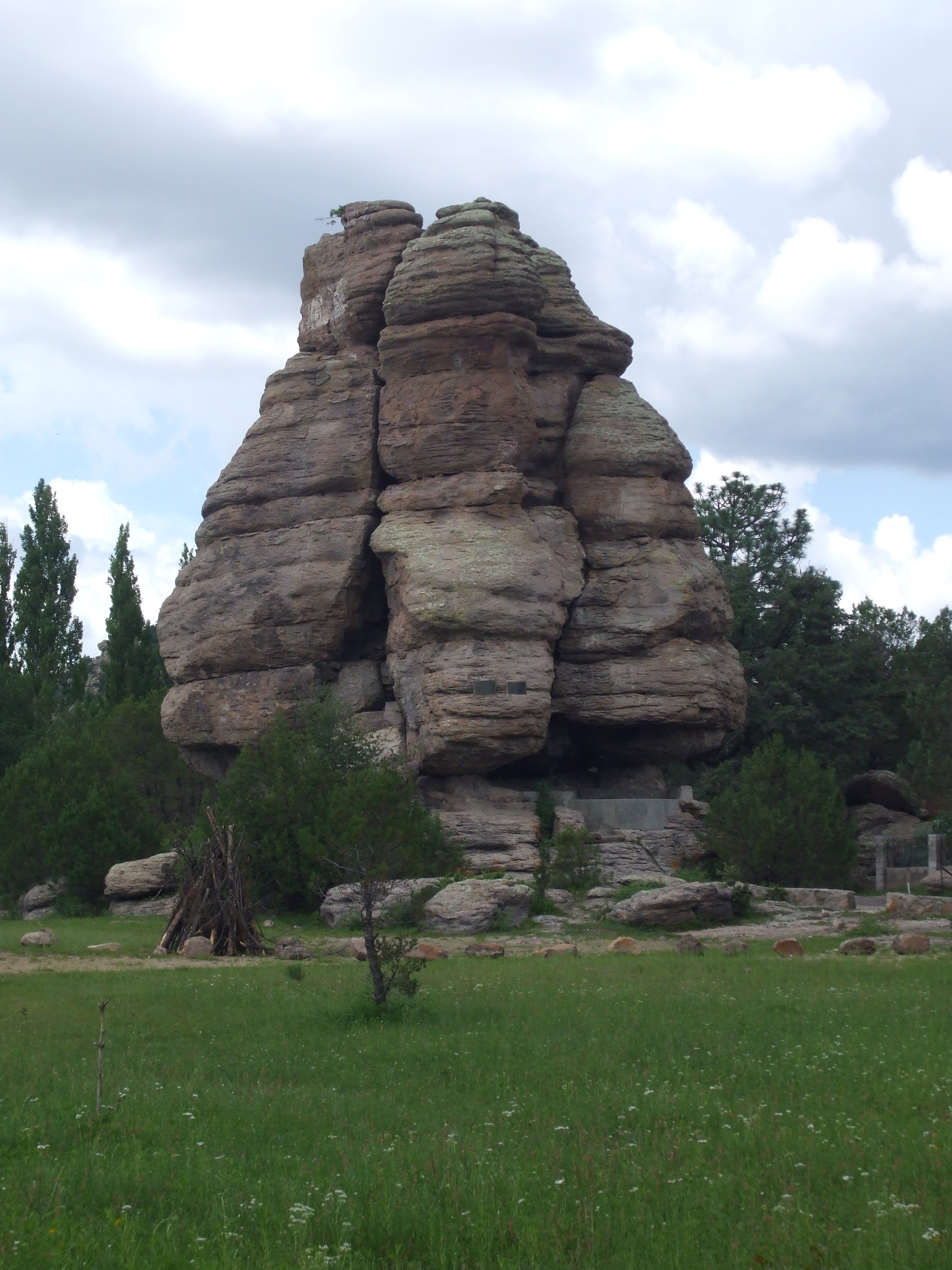
Cumbres de Majalca National Park is found in the transition zone from humid subtropical climate to semiarid climate where Pinus ponderosa can be found.

The state has a great diversity due to the large number of microclimates found and dramatic varying terrain. The flora throughout the Sierra Madre Occidental mountain range varies with elevation. Pine (Pinus) and oak (Quercus) species are usually found at an elevation of 2,000 m (6,560 ft) above sea level. The most common species of flora found in the mountains are: Pinus, Quercus, Abies, Ficus, Vachellia, Ipomoea, Acacia, Lysiloma, Bursera, Vitex, Tabebuia, Sideroxylon, Cordia, Fouquieria, Pithecellobium. The state is home to one of the largest variation species of the genus Pinus in the world. The lower elevations have a steppe vegetation with a variety of grasses and small bushes. Several species of Juniperus dot the steppe and the transition zone.

According to the World Wide Fund for Nature, the Chihuahuan Desert may be the most biologically diverse desert in the world, whether measured on species richness or endemism, although the region has been heavily degraded over time. Many native species have been replaced with creosote shrubs. The most common desert flora in the state includes: Agave, Larrea, Prosopis, Fouquieria, Dasylirion, Yucca, Poaceae, Lophophora, Opuntia, Echinocereus, Baileya, Chilopsis, Eucnide, and Hylocereus.

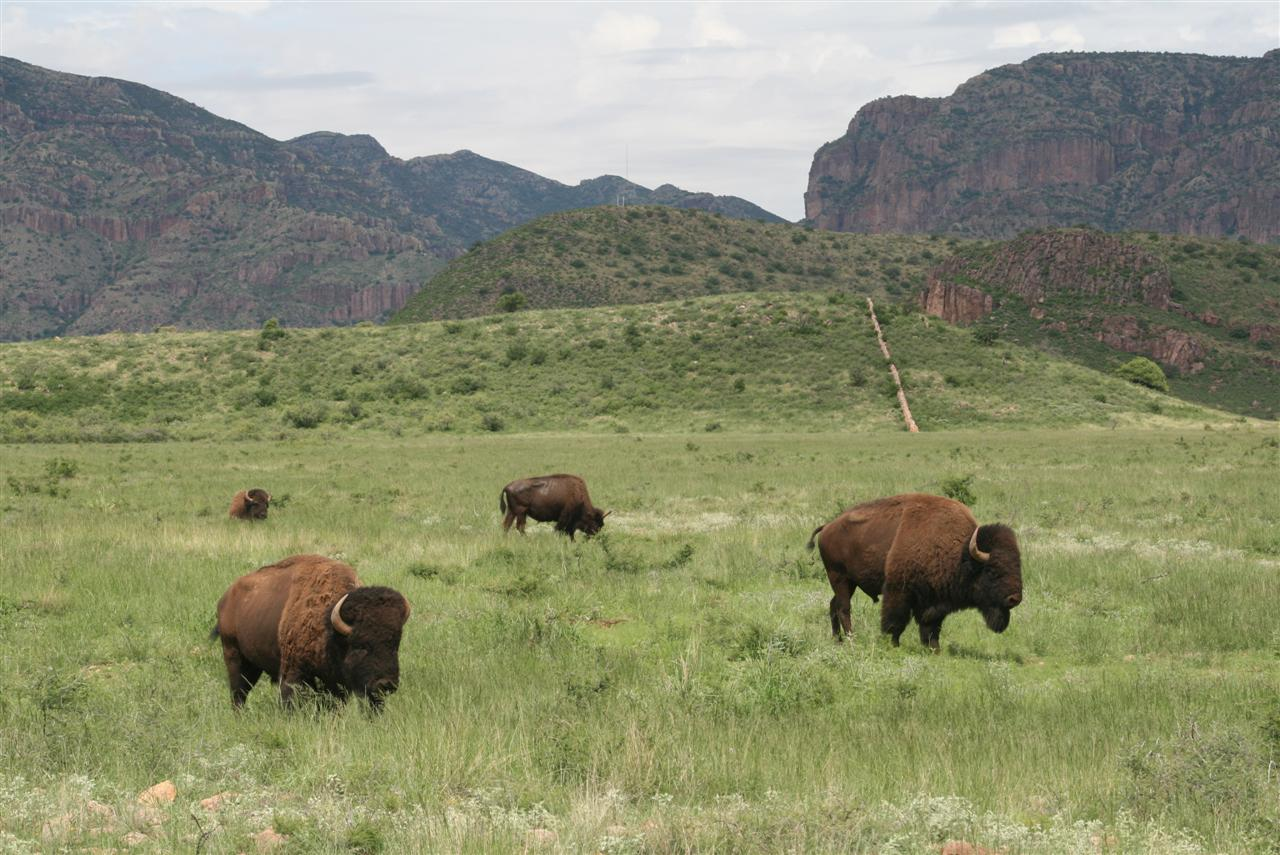
American bison (Bison bison) near Chihuahua City.

The fauna in the state is just as diverse as the flora and varies greatly due to the large contrast in climates. In the mountain zone of the state the most observed mammals are: Mexican fox squirrel (Sciurus nayaritensis), antelope jackrabbit (Lepus alleni), raccoon (Procyon lotor), hooded skunk (Mephitis macroura), collared peccary (Dicotyles tajacu), white-tailed deer (Odocoileus virginianus), mule deer (Odocoileus hemionus), American bison (Bison bison), cougar (Puma concolor), jaguar (Panthera onca), eastern cottontail (Sylvilagus floridanus), North American porcupine (Erethizon dorsatum), bobcat (Lynx rufus), Mexican wolf (Canis lupus baileyi), and coyote (Canis latrans). The American black bear (Ursus americanus) is also found but in very small numbers. The main cause of degradation has been grazing. Although there are many reptilian species in the mountains the most observed species include: Northern Mexican pine snake, Pituophis deppei jani, Texas horned lizard (Phrynosoma cornutum), rock rattlesnake (Crotalus lepidus), black-tailed rattlesnake (Crotalus molossus), and plateau tiger salamander Ambystoma velasci, one of possibly many amphibians to be found in the mountains.

The Chihuahuan Desert is home to a diverse ecosystem which is home to a large variety of mammals. The most common mammals in the desert include: desert cottontail Sylvilagus audubonii, black-tailed jackrabbit Lepus californicus, hooded skunk, cactus mouse Peromyscus eremicus, white-throated woodrat Neotoma albigula, pallid bat Antrozous pallidus, and coyote. The most observed reptiles in the desert include: Mohave rattlesnake Crotalus scutulatus, twin-spotted rattlesnake Crotalus pricei, prairie rattlesnake Crotalus viridis, ridge-nosed rattlesnake Crotalus willardi, whip snake Masticophis flagellum, New Mexico whiptail Aspidoscelis neomexicanus, and red-spotted toad Bufo punctatus.

The state is also a host to a large population of birds which include endemic species and migratory species: greater roadrunner Geococcyx californianus, cactus wren Campylorhynchus brunneicapillus, Mexican jay Aphelocoma ultramarina, Steller's jay Cyanocitta stelleri, acorn woodpecker Melanerpes formicivorus, canyon towhee Pipilo fuscus, mourning dove Zenaida macroura, broad-billed hummingbird Cynanthus latirostris, Montezuma quail Cyrtonyx montezumae, mountain trogon Trogon mexicanus, turkey vulture Cathartes aura, and golden eagle Aquila chrysaetos. Trogon mexicanus is an endemic species found in the mountains in Mexico and has symbolic significance to Mexicans.

Flora and fauna of Chihuahua

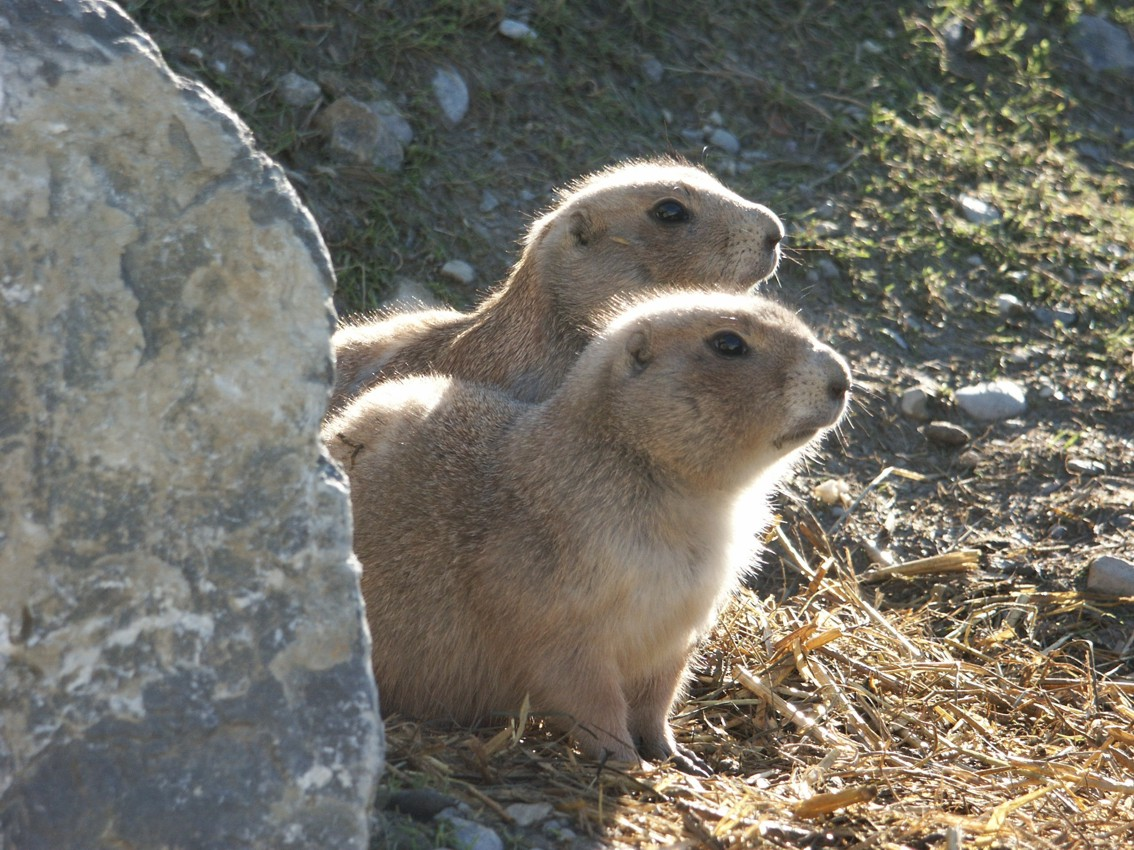
Cynomys ludovicianus

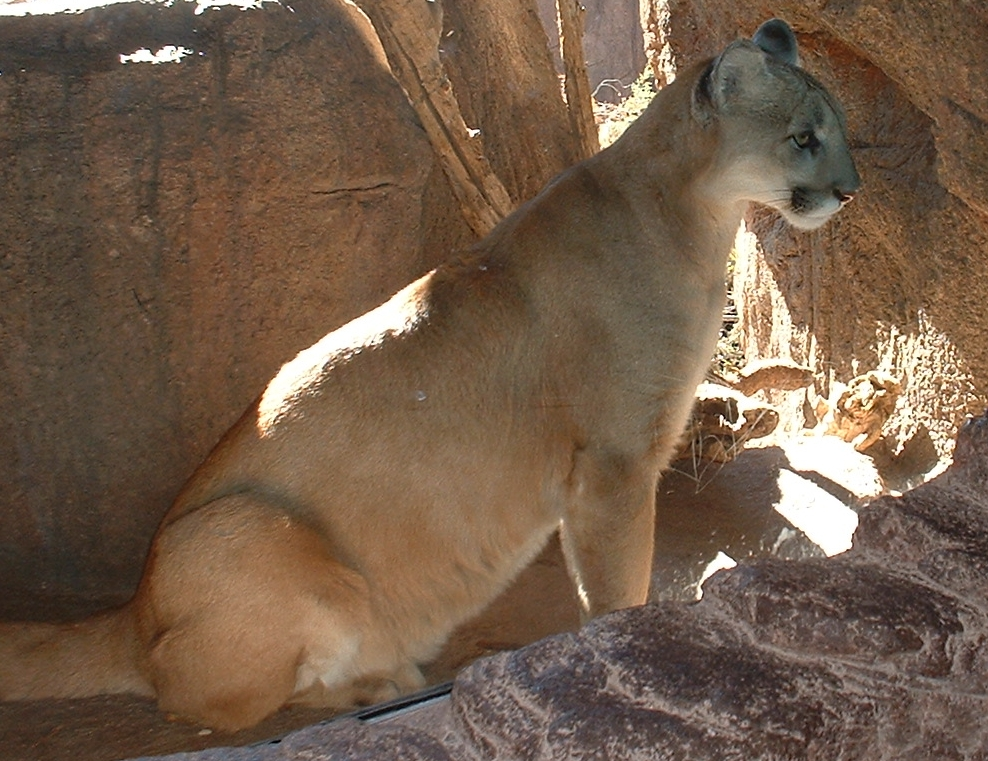
Puma concolor

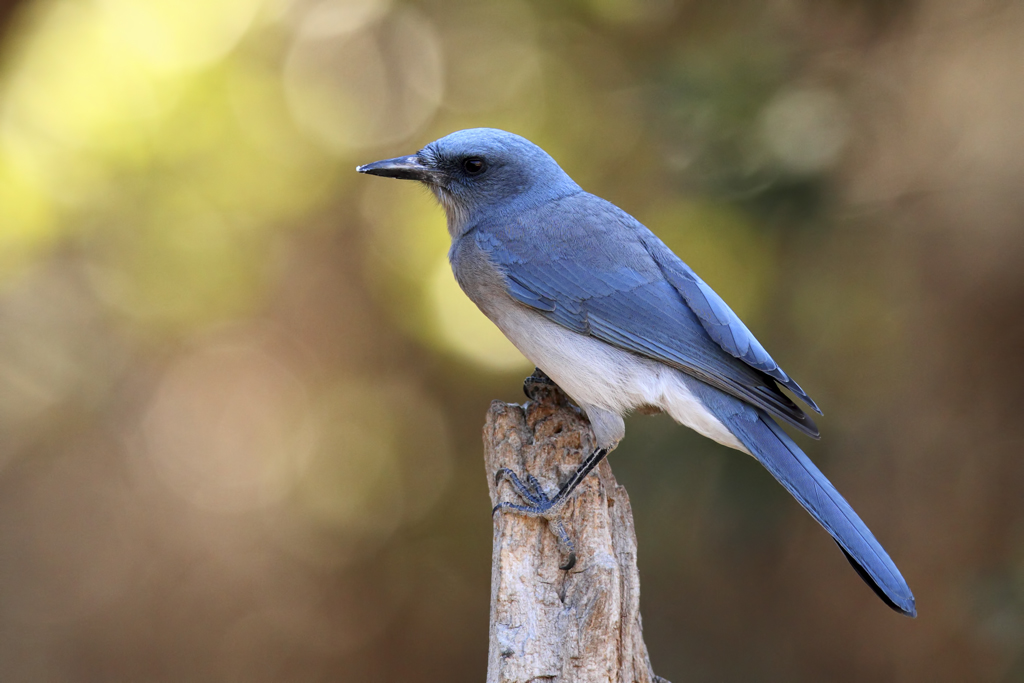
Aphelocoma wollweberi

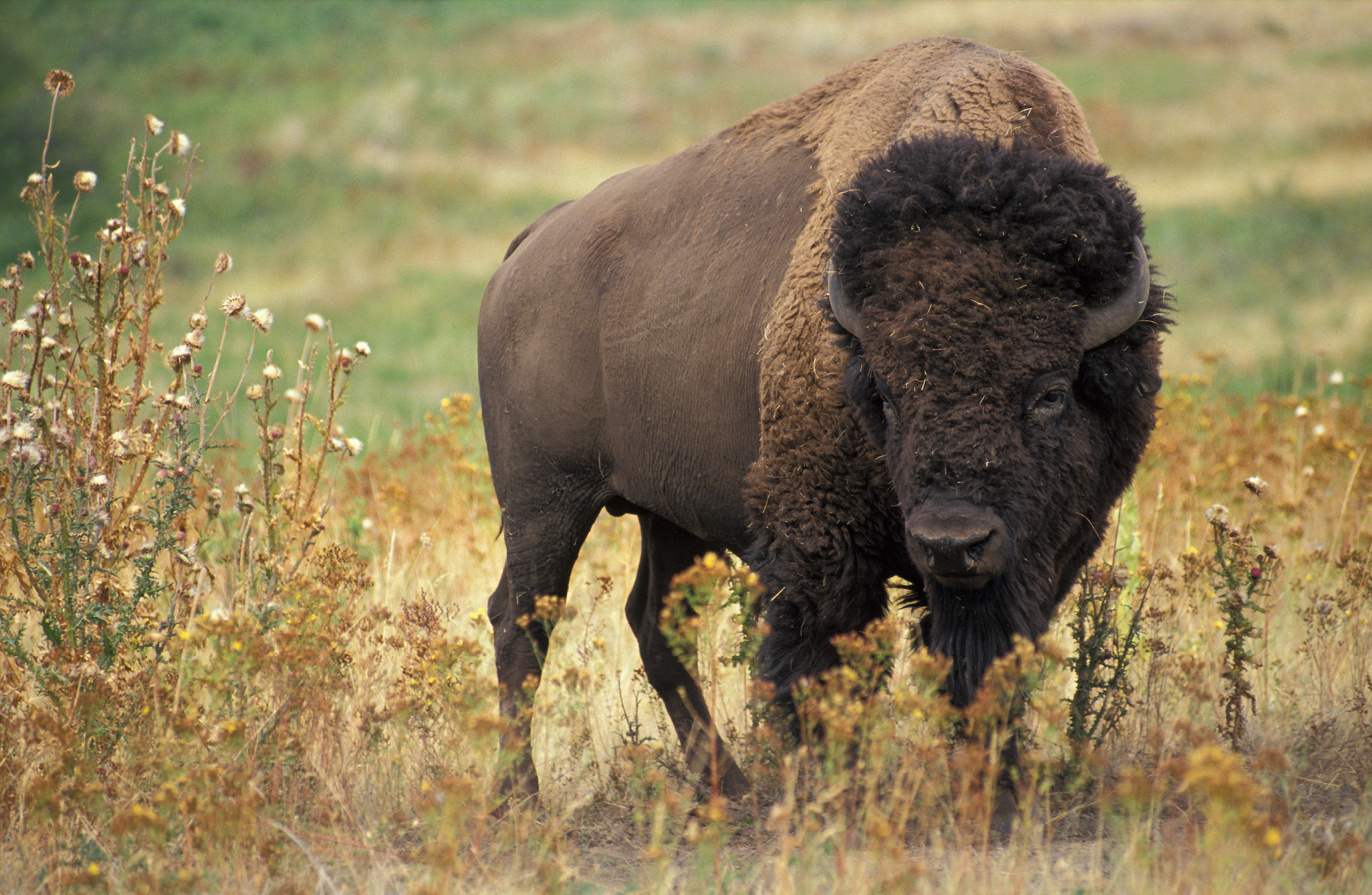
Bison bison

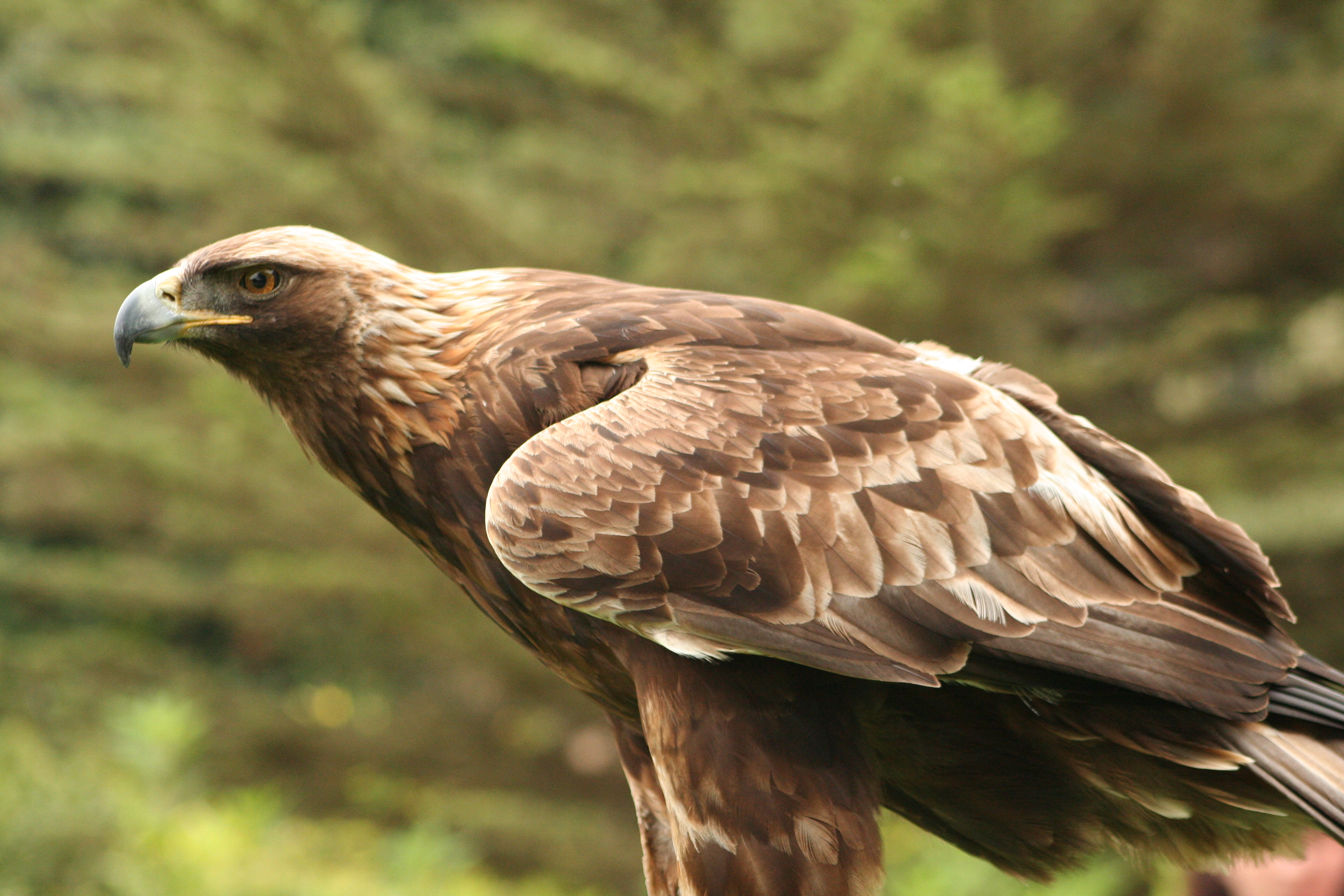
Aquila chrysaetos

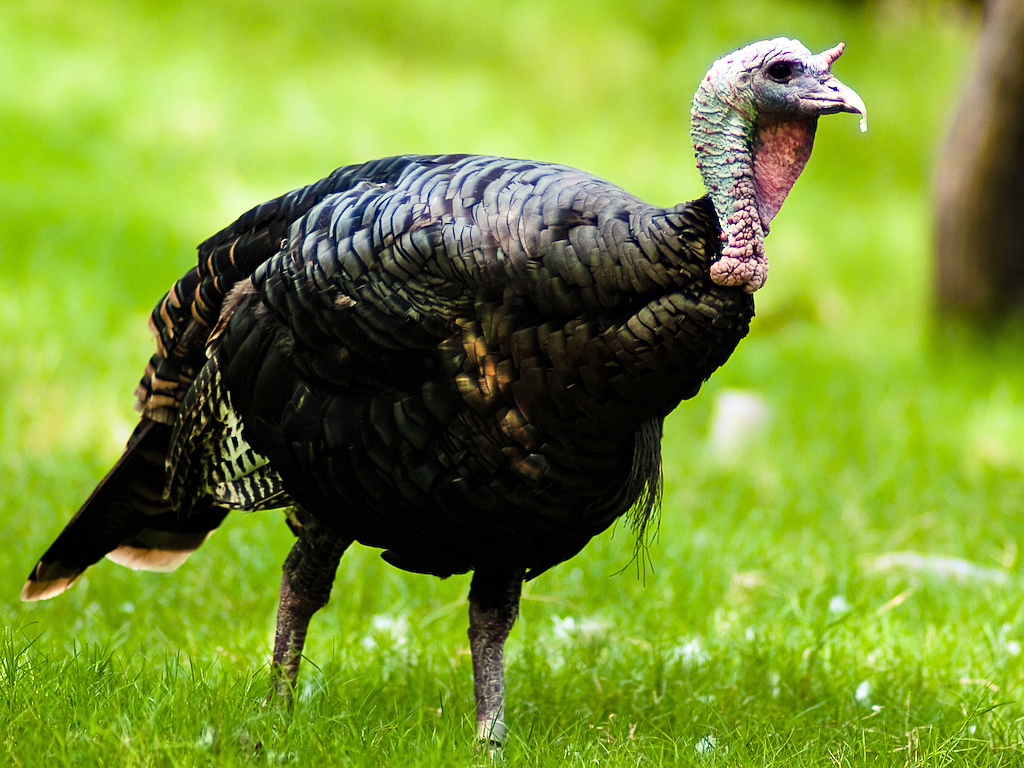
Meleagris gallopavo

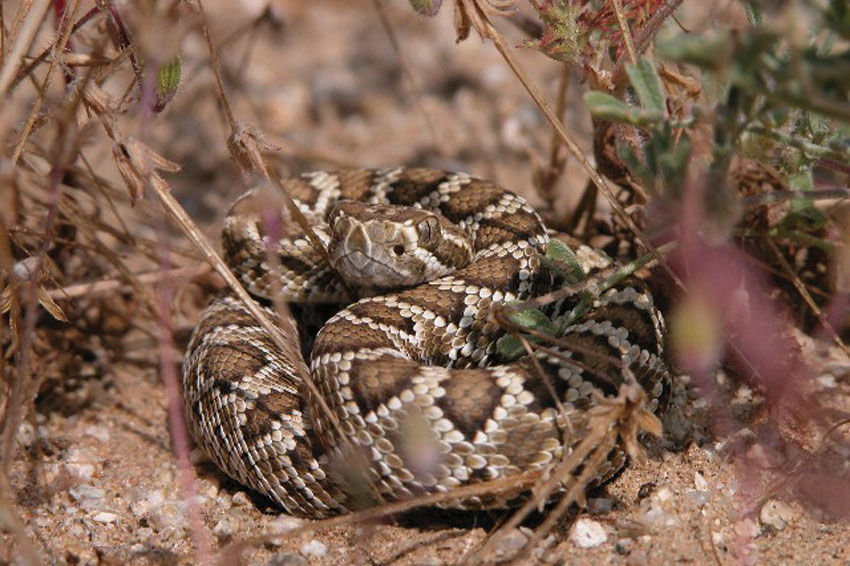
Crotalus scutulatus

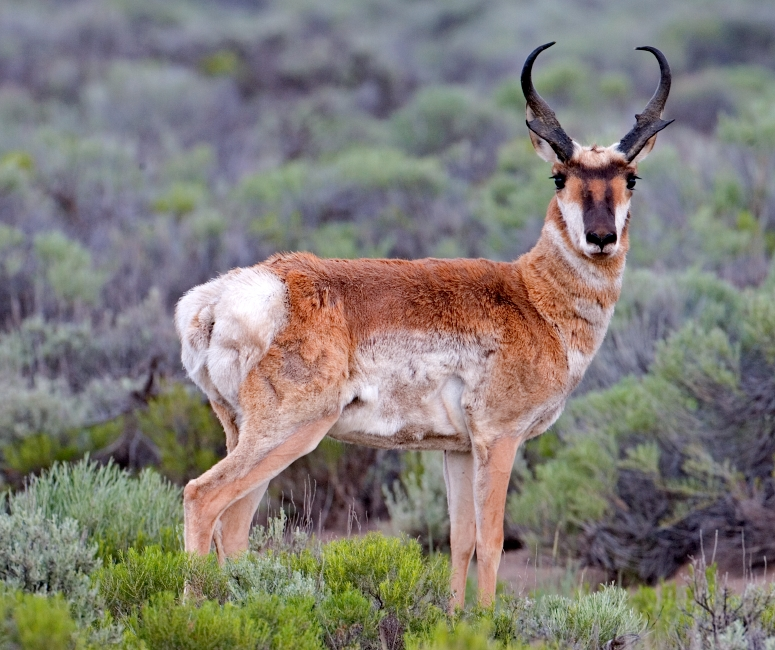
Antilocapra americana

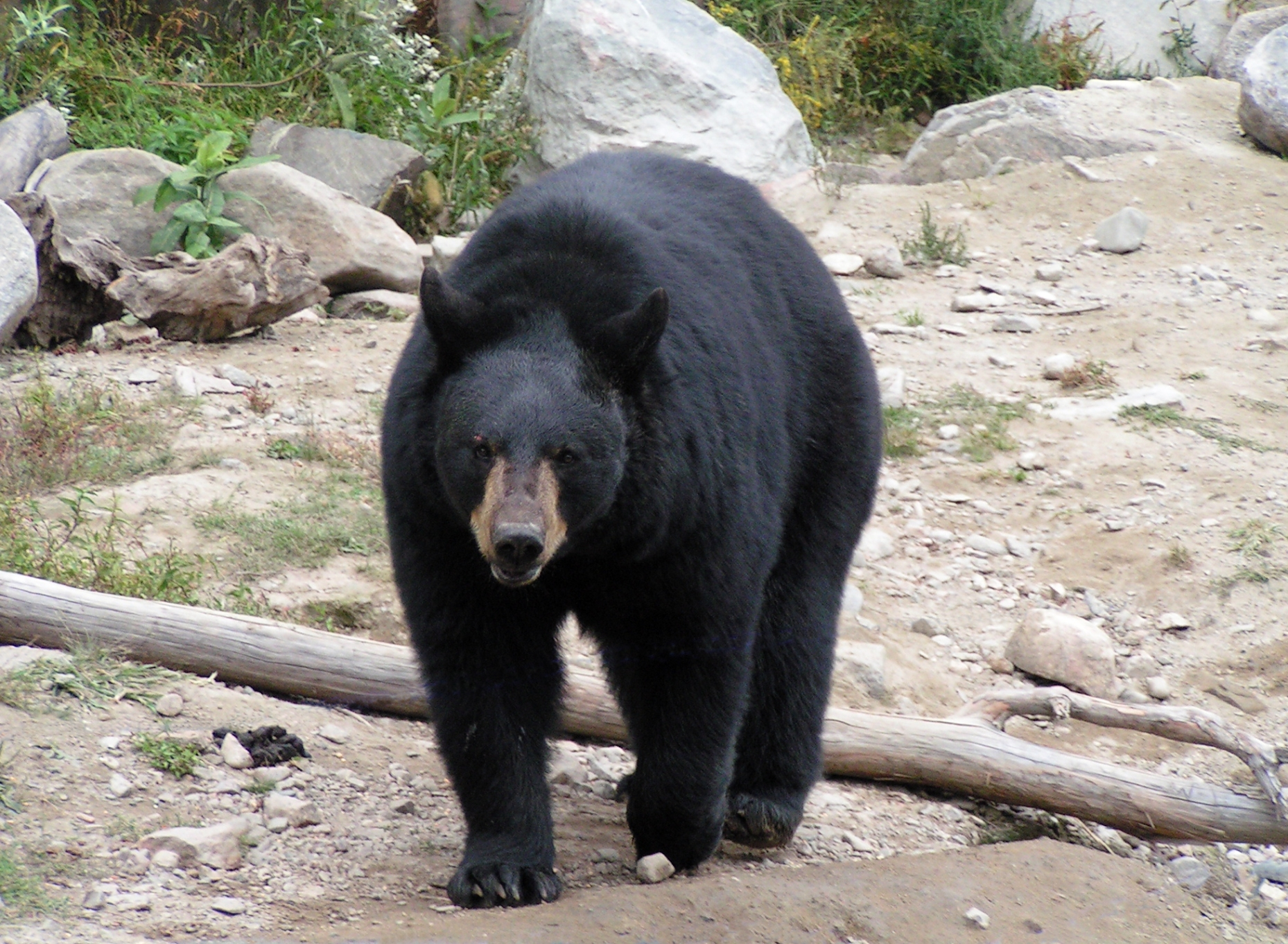
Ursus americanus

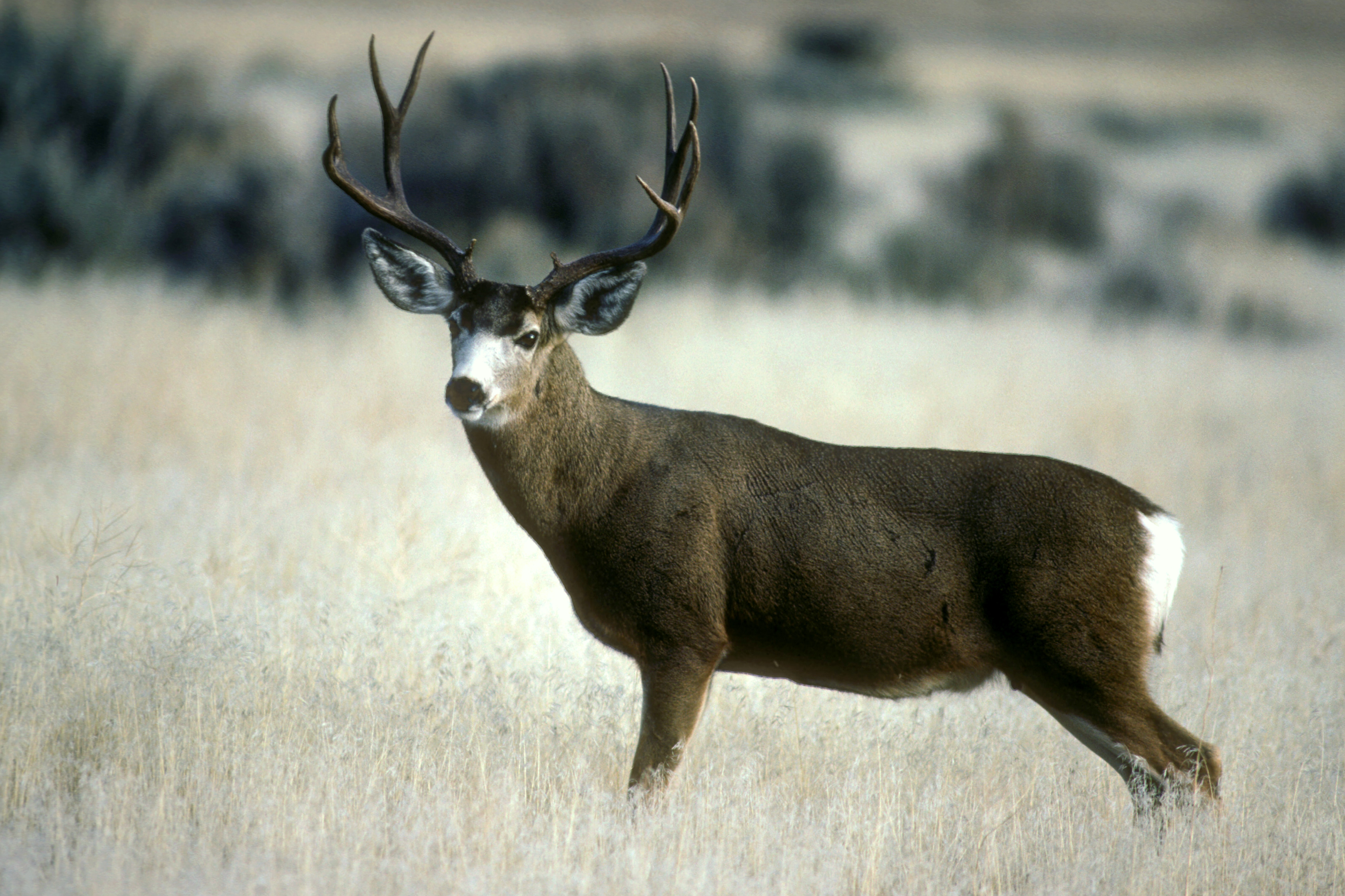
Odocoileus hemionus

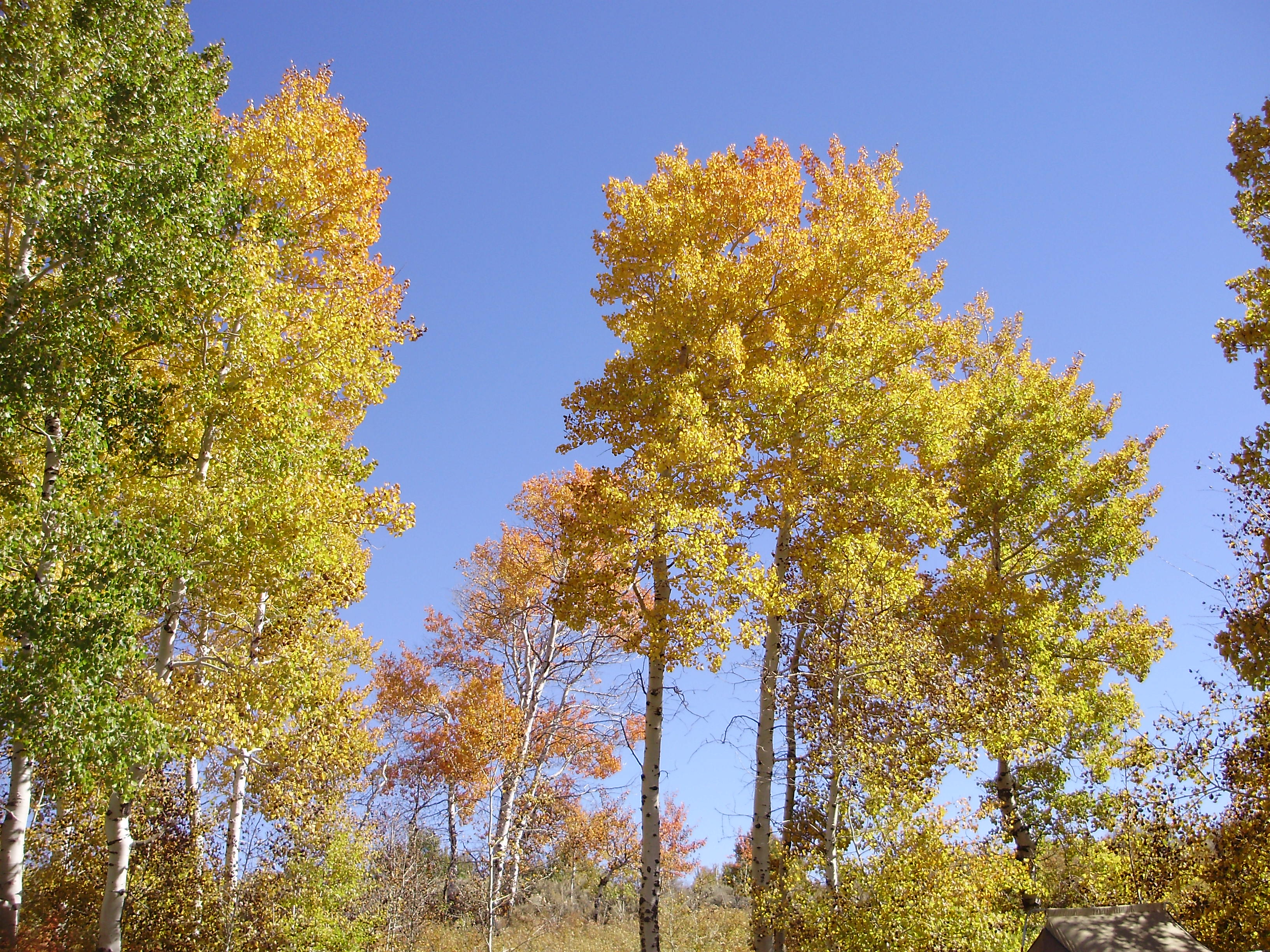
Populus tremuloides

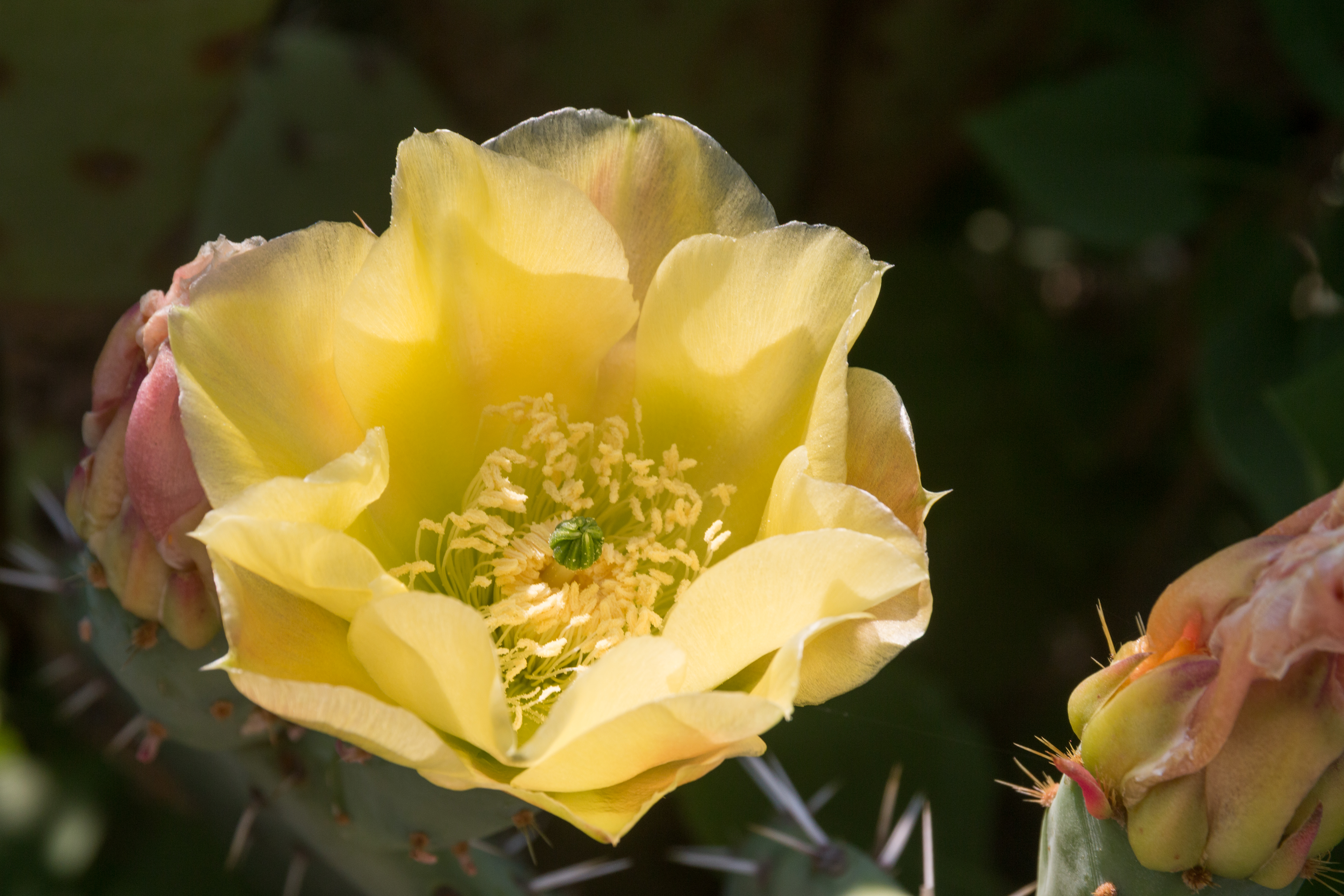
Opuntia engelmannii

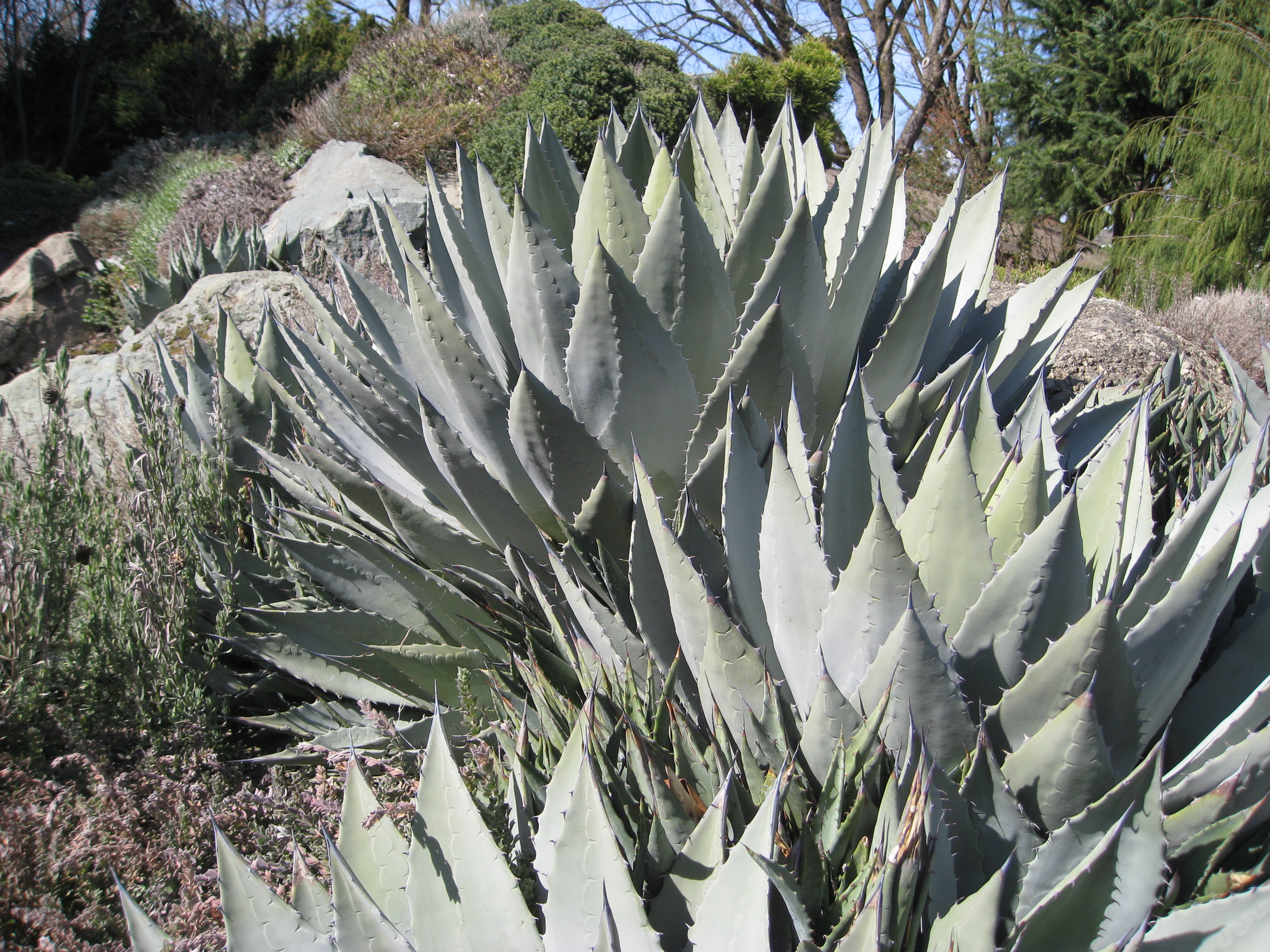
Agave palmeri

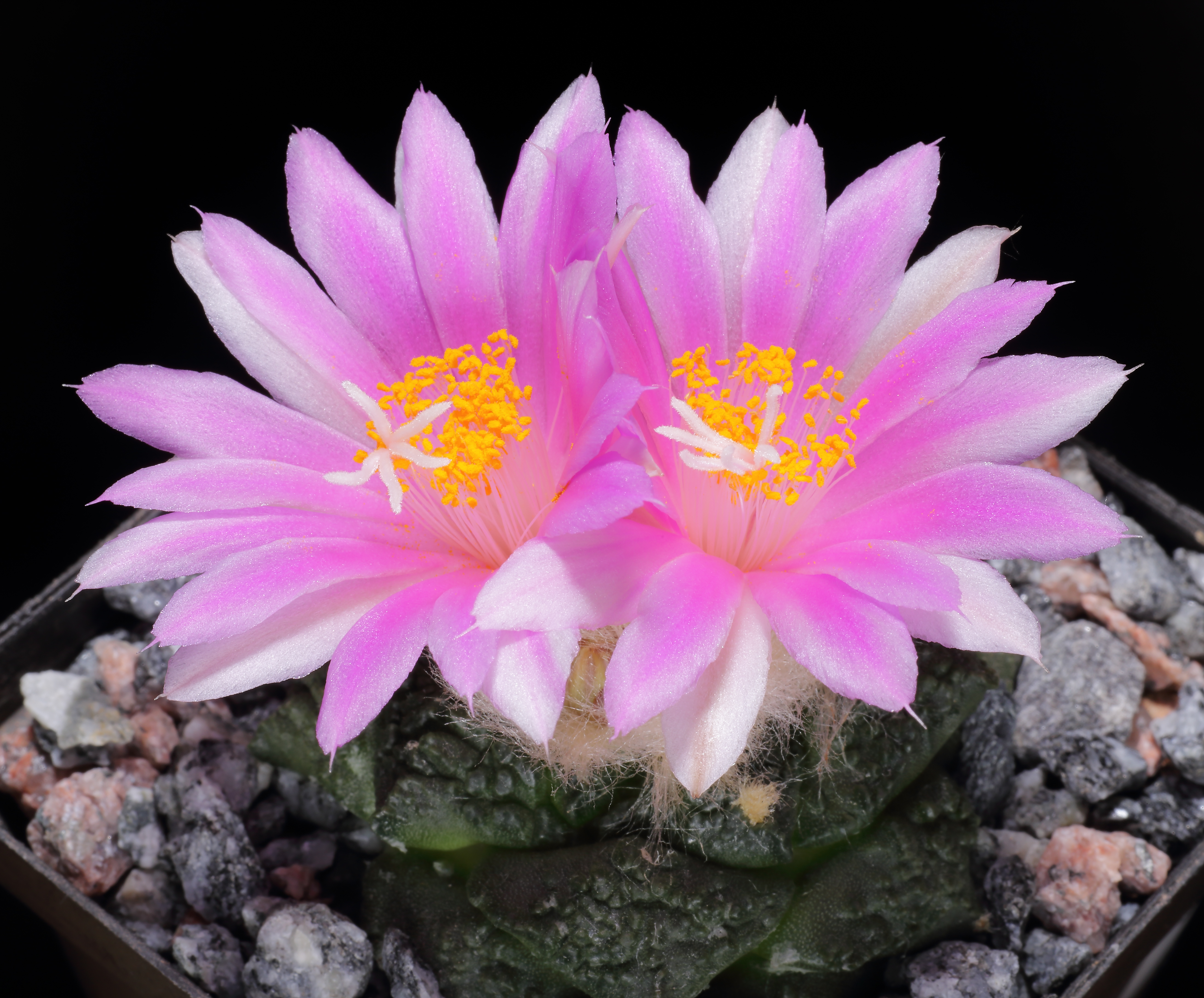
Ariocarpus fissuratus

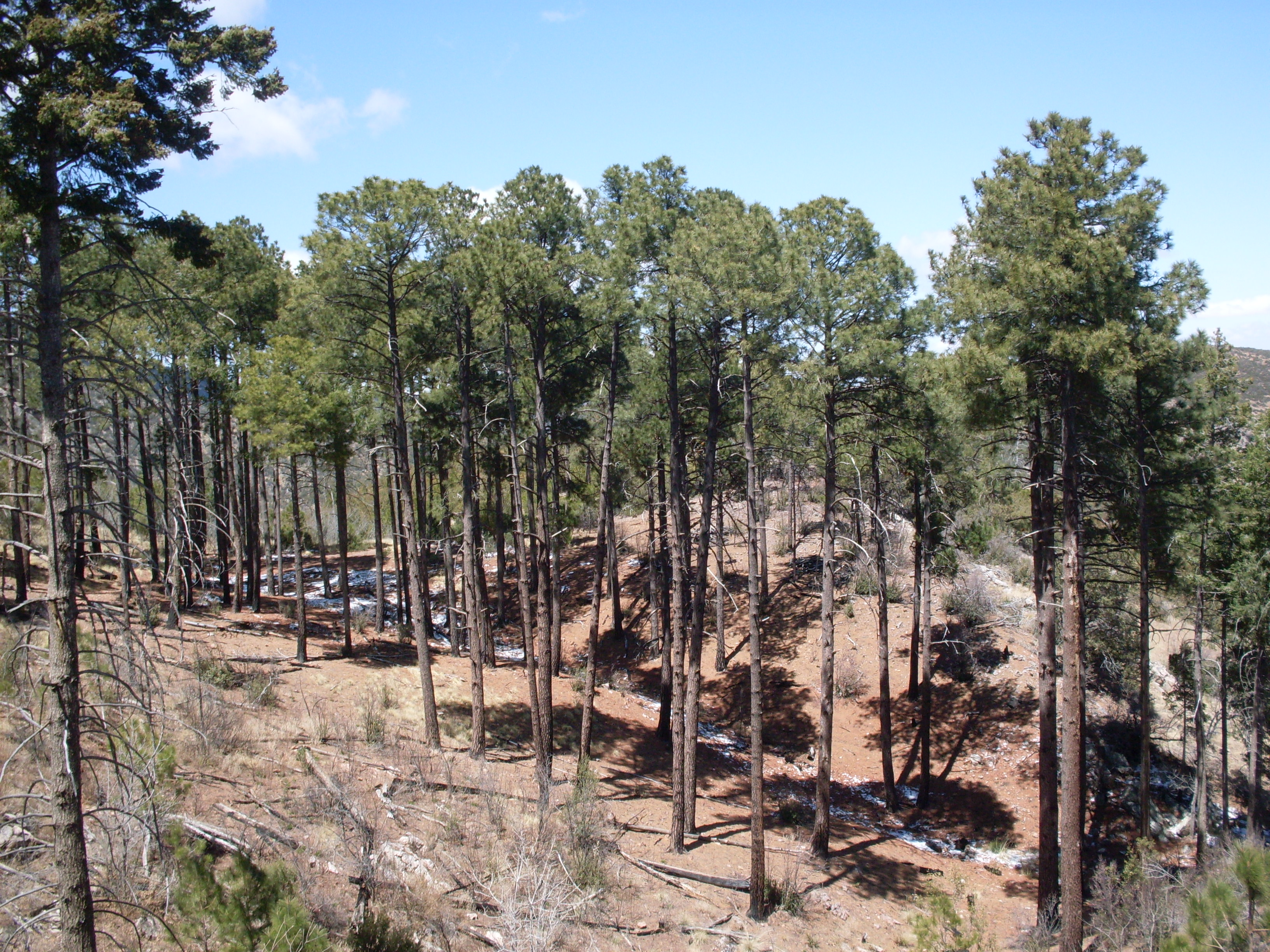
Pinus engelmannii

== Demography ==
Largest cities or towns in Chihuahua Source:
| Rank | | Municipality | Pop. |
|---|---|---|---|
| 1 | Ciudad Juárez | Juárez | 1,501,551 |
| 2 | Chihuahua | Chihuahua | 925,762 |
| 3 | Cuauhtémoc | Cuauhtémoc | 135,586 |
| 4 | Delicias | Delicias | 128,548 |
| 5 | Hidalgo del Parral | Hidalgo del Parral | 113,843 |
| 6 | Nuevo Casas Grandes | Nuevo Casas Grandes | 62,038 |
| 7 | Camargo | Camargo | 42,019 |
| 8 | Jiménez | Jiménez | 35,087 |
| 9 | Meoqui | Meoqui | 23,140 |
| 10 | Aldama | Aldama | 22,568 |

Historical population
| Year | Pop. | ±% |
|---|---|---|
| 1895 | 265,546 | — |
| 1900 | 327,784 | +23.4% |
| 1910 | 405,707 | +23.8% |
| 1921 | 401,622 | −1.0% |
| 1930 | 491,792 | +22.5% |
| 1940 | 623,944 | +26.9% |
| 1950 | 846,414 | +35.7% |
| 1960 | 1,226,793 | +44.9% |
| 1970 | 1,612,525 | +31.4% |
| 1980 | 2,005,477 | +24.4% |
| 1990 | 2,441,873 | +21.8% |
| 2000 | 3,052,907 | +25.0% |
| 2010 | 3,406,465 | +11.6% |
| 2015 | 3,556,574 | +4.4% |
| 2020 | 3,741,869 | +5.2% |

According to the census by the Instituto Nacional de Estadística y Geografía (INEGI) in 2005, the state population is 3,241,444 making the state the 11th most populated state in Mexico. Census recorded 1,610,275 men and 1,631,169 women. The median age of the population is 25 years. The northern state is placed seventh in the nation regarding quality of life and sixth in terms of life expectancy at 75.2 years of age.

During the period from 2000–2005 it is estimated that 49,722 people left the state for the United States. Some 82,000 people are thought to have immigrated to the state from 2000–2005 mainly coming from Veracruz (17.6%), United States (16.2%), Durango (13.2%), Coahuila (8.0%) and Chiapas (4.5%). It is believed that there is a large number of undocumented immigrants in that state the come from Central and South America which mainly settle in Ciudad Juárez. According to the 2005 census, the population grew 1.06% from 2000 to 2005. The state has an uneven settlement of people and the lowest population density of any Mexican state; according to the 2005 census there were 12 people per km^{2}. Of all the 3,241,444 people in the state, two-thirds (2,072,129) live in the cities of Ciudad Juárez and Chihuahua. Only three other cities have populations over 100,000: Parral 101,147, Cuauhtémoc 105,725, and Delicias 108,187.

=== Ethnic groups ===
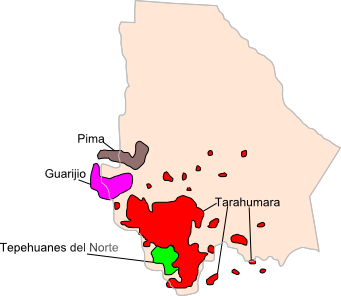
Indigenous Tribes: Tarahumara Tepehuan Del Norte Guarijío Pima

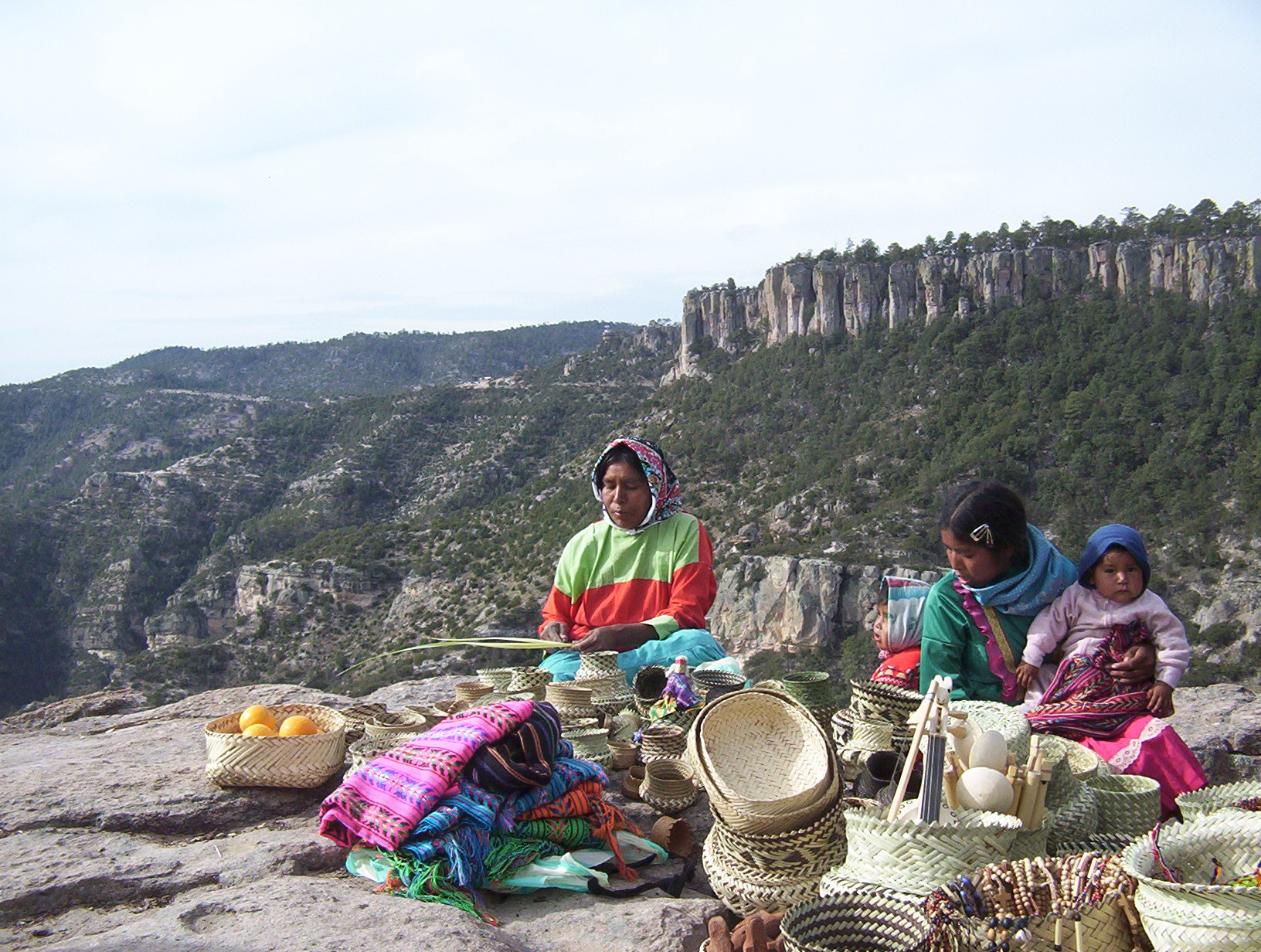
Tarahumara women selling artisanal goods.

Municipality Population Density Data Source: INEGI: 250-1,000 ppl per km^{2} 25-249 ppl per km^{2} 5-24 ppl per km^{2} 1-4 ppl per km^{2}

The last census in Mexico that asked for an individual's race, which was taken in 1921, indicated that 50.09% of the population identified as Mestizo (mixed Amerindian and European descent). The second-largest group was whites at 36.33% of the population. The third-largest group was the "pure indigenous" population, constituting 12.76% of the population. The remaining 0.82% of the population of Chihuahua was considered "other", i.e. neither Mestizo, indigenous, nor white. The most important indigenous tribes of the state of Chihuahua are:

- Tarahumara: The largest ethnic group of indigenous people in the state. They call themselves Rarámuri, which means "Barefoot Runner". They are famous for their endurance in running long distances. They live in large areas of the Sierra Madre Occidental. Many have migrated to the large cities of the state mainly for economic incentives.
- Tepehuan Del Norte: A tribe linguistically differentiated from the Tepehuan in the state of Durango. The tribe lives near the small towns of Guadalupe y Calvo and Baborigame.
- Guarijío: A small tribe linguistically differentiated from the other tribes of the state. Little is known about these indigenous tribes except that they live near the small villages of Chínipas and Uruachi.
- Pima: A large ethnic group that lives across extensive areas of northwestern Mexico and southwestern United States. The population of the tribe in the state is small, mostly around the town of Temósachi. Although all the tribe speaks the same language, variant dialects have been discovered between different settlements.

According to the 2020 Census, 1.63% of Chihuahua's population identified as Black, Afro-Mexican, or of African descent.

=== Religion ===
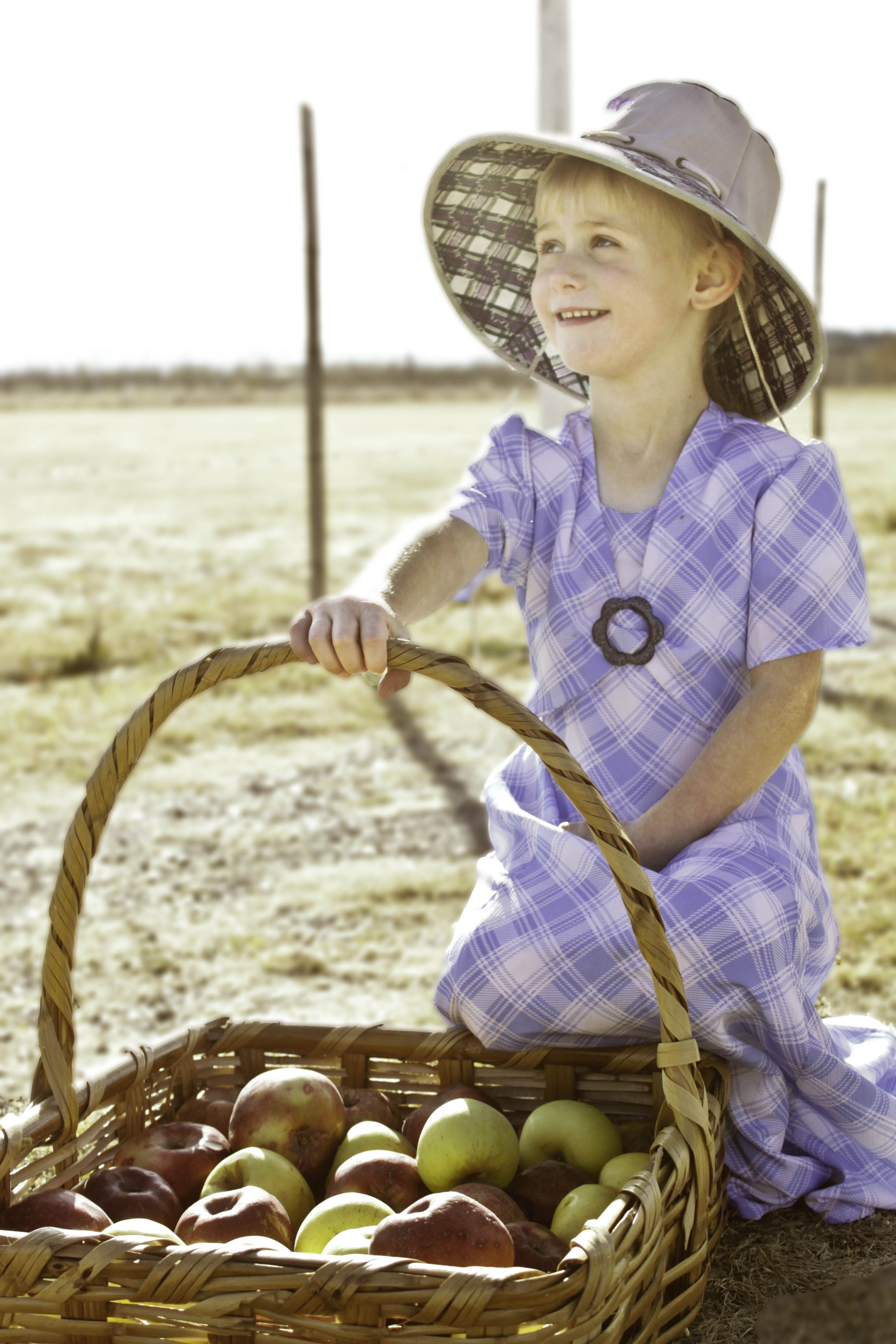
Plautdietsch-speaking Mennonite girl in Cuauhtémoc, Chihuahua.

Although the great majority of residents of the state of Chihuahua are Catholics, there is a large diversity of religions within the state. There are many apostolic churches, Mormon wards, and large Mennonite communities. Those aged 5 years and older claim to be the following religious beliefs: 84.6% are Catholic; 7.1% are Protestant; 2.0% are Nondenominational; 5.1% are Atheist. Compared to most of Mexico, the state has a higher percentage of Protestants.

During the Mexican Revolution, Álvaro Obregón invited a group of Canadian German-speaking Mennonites to resettle in Mexico. By the late 1920s, some 7,000 had immigrated to Chihuahua State and Durango State, almost all from Canada, only a few from the U.S. and Russia. Today, Mexico accounts for about 42% of all Mennonites in Latin America. They are a largely insular community that speaks a form of German and wear traditional clothing. They own their own businesses in various communities in Chihuahua, and account for about half of the state's farm economy, excelling in cheese production.

=== Main cities ===
The state has one city with a population exceeding one million: Ciudad Juárez. Ciudad Juárez is ranked eighth most populous city in the country, and Chihuahua City was ranked 16th most populous in Mexico. Chihuahua (along with Baja California) is the only state in Mexico to have two cities ranked in the top 20 most populated. El Paso and Ciudad Juárez form one of the largest binational metropolitan areas in the world, with a combined population of 2.4 million. In fact, Ciudad Juárez is one of the fastest-growing cities in the world, in spite of the fact that it is "the most violent zone in the world outside of declared war zones". For instance, a few years ago the Federal Reserve Bank of Dallas published that in Ciudad Juárez "the average annual growth over the 10-year period 1990–2000 was 5.3 percent. Juárez experienced much higher population growth than the state of Chihuahua and than Mexico as a whole". Chihuahua City has one of the highest literacy rates in the country, at 98%; 35% of the population is aged 14 or below, 60% 15–65, and 5% over 65. The growth rate is 2.4%. The 76.5% of the population of the state of Chihuahua live in cities which makes the state one of the most urbanized in Mexico.

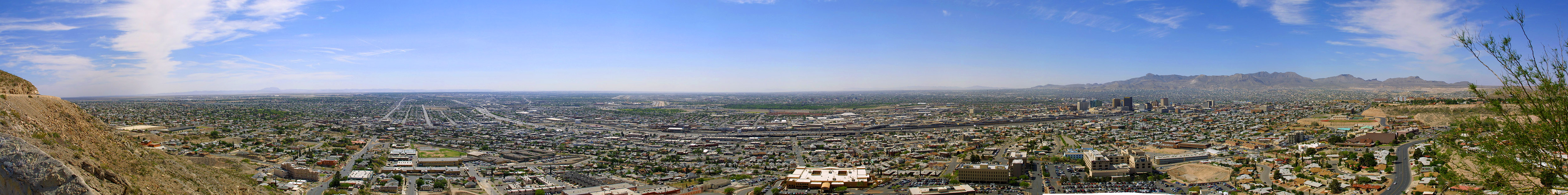
A panoramic view of Ciudad Juárez and El Paso, Texas from the north. The Hueco Mountains can be seen toward the east; the Juárez mountains of Mexico can be seen to the south (right of the image).

== Education ==
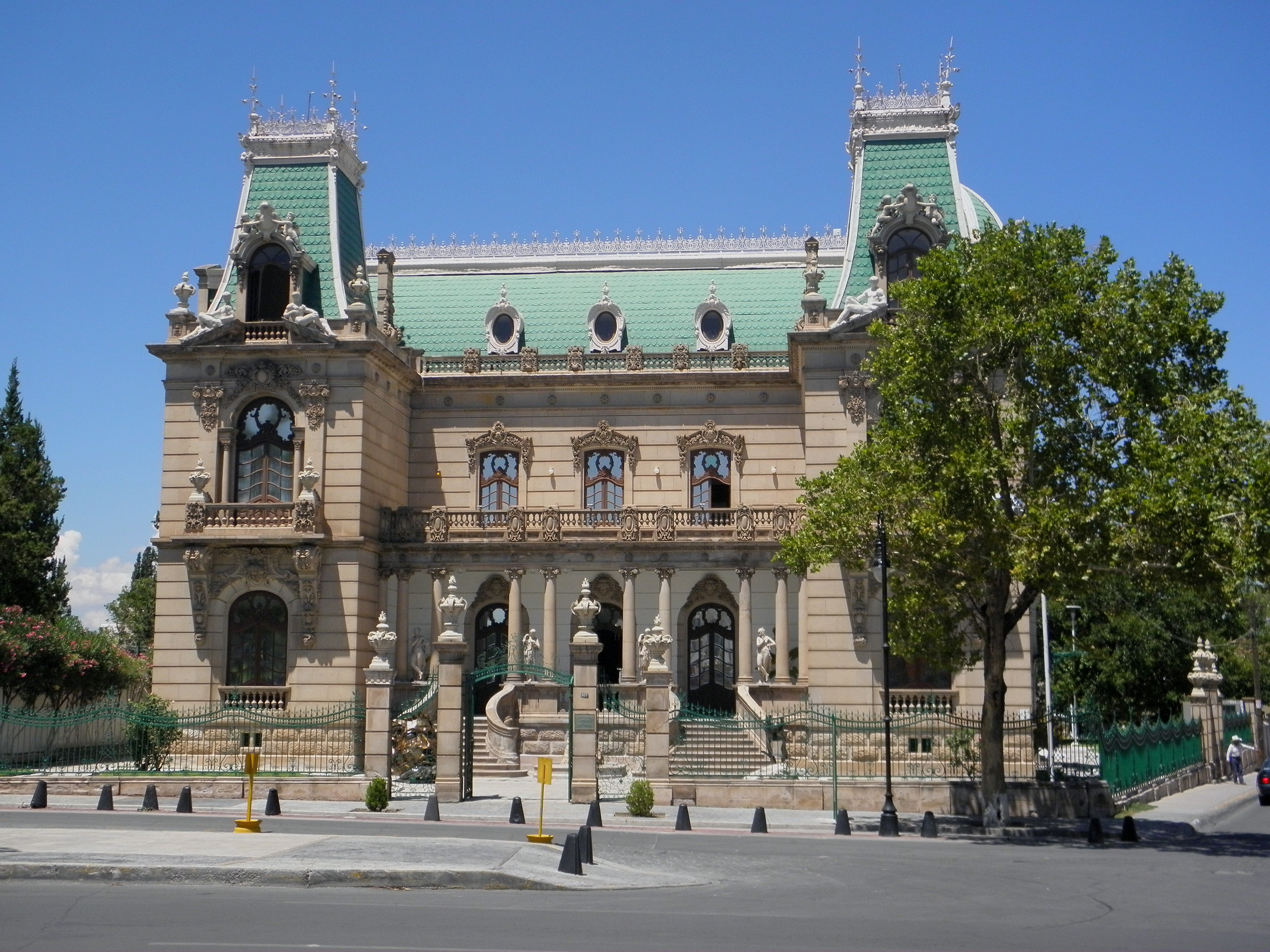
Quinta Gameros was built in 1907 as a private residence and is now part of the Universidad Autónoma de Chihuahua Campus.

According to the Instituto Nacional de Estadística, Geografía e Informática (INEGI), 95.6% of the population over the age of 15 could read and write Spanish, and 97.3% of children of ages 8–14 could read and write Spanish. An estimated 93.5% of the population ages 6–14 attend an institution of education. Estimated 12.8% of residents of the state have obtained a college degree. Average schooling is 8.5 years, which means that in general the average citizen over 15 years of age has gone as far as a second year in secondary education.

Institutions of higher education include:

- Instituto Tecnológico de Chihuahua
- Instituto Tecnológico de Chihuahua II
- Universidad Autónoma de Ciudad Juárez
- Universidad Autónoma de Chihuahua
- Instituto Tecnólogico y de Estudios Superiores de Monterrey Campus Chihuahua
- Universidad La Salle
- Universidad Tecnológica de Chihuahua

== Government ==
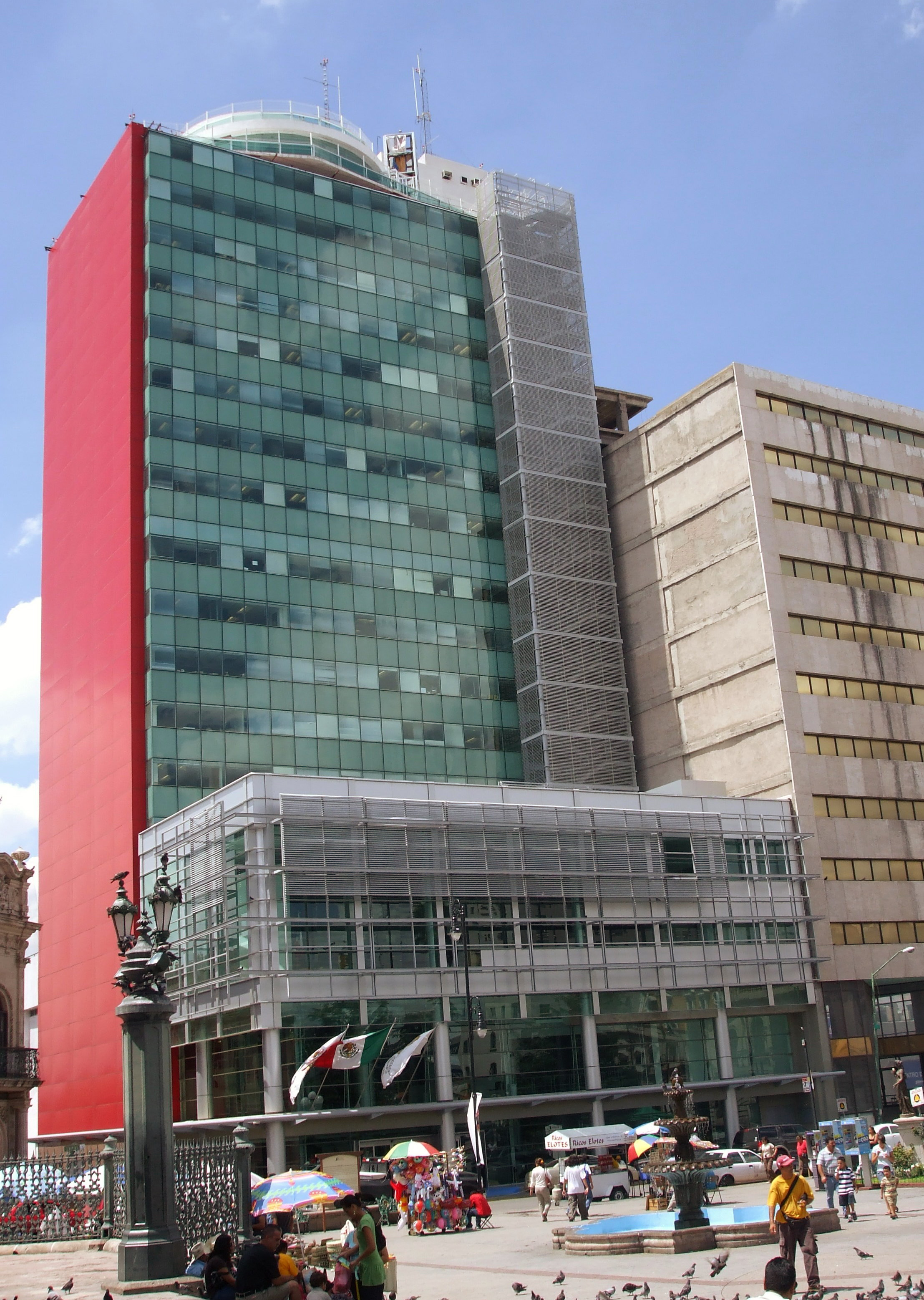
The state legislature

The current government of the state was established officially by the Political Constitution of the United Mexican States in 1917. The state government is divided into three branches: the legislative branch, the judicial branch, and the executive branch. The government is centrally located in the state capital Chihuahua City.

The legislative branch consists of an elected assembly of representatives to form the state congress. The congress is composed of 33 deputies, of which 22 are directly elected to represent each of the 22 districts in the state. In addition 11 deputies are elected by system of proportional representation through a list of registered political party members. Deputies are elected every three years and cannot be reelected consecutively.

The judicial branch is led by the Supreme Tribunal of Justice which is constituted of 15 magistrate judges. The judges are appointed by the governor and approved by the state congress. The executive branch is headed by the governor of the state, who is elected for one term of six years on the fourth day of October every election year. Governors are not eligible to be reelected due to constitutional one-term limitation.

The state is represented at the federal level in the Congress of the Union by three senators and nine deputies (representatives). The deputies serve three-year terms and are elected in federal elections. The senators serve six-year terms and are elected in federal elections.

=== Administrative divisions ===
Chihuahua is subdivided into 67 municipios (municipalities).

Municipalities of the State of Chihuahua
| Number | Municipality | Municipal Seat | Number | Municipality | Municipal Seat |
|---|---|---|---|---|---|
| 001 | Ahumada | Villa Ahumada | 035 | Janos | Janos |
| 002 | Aldama | Aldama | 036 | Jiménez | Ciudad Jiménez |
| 003 | Allende | Valle de Allende | 037 | Juárez | Ciudad Juárez |
| 004 | Aquiles Serdán | Santa Eulalia | 038 | Julimes | Julimes |
| 005 | Ascensión | Ascensión | 039 | López | Villa López |
| 006 | Bachíniva | Bachíniva | 040 | Madera | Ciudad Madera |
| 007 | Balleza | Mariano Balleza | 041 | Maguarichi | Maguarichi |
| 008 | Batopilas | Batopilas | 042 | Manuel Benavides | Manuel Benavides |
| 009 | Bocoyna | Bocoyna | 043 | Matachí | Matachí |
| 010 | Buenaventura | San Buenaventura | 044 | Matamoros | Villa Matamoros |
| 011 | Camargo | Camargo | 045 | Meoqui | Meoqui |
| 012 | Carichí | Carichí | 046 | Morelos | Morelos |
| 013 | Casas Grandes | Casas Grandes | 047 | Moris | Moris |
| 014 | Coronado | Villa Coronado | 048 | Namiquipa | Namiquipa |
| 015 | Coyame del Sotol | Coyame | 049 | Nonoava | Nonoava |
| 016 | La Cruz | La Cruz | 050 | Nuevo Casas Grandes | Nuevo Casas Grandes |
| 017 | Cuauhtémoc | Cuauhtémoc | 051 | Ocampo | Melchor Ocampo |
| 018 | Cusihuiriachi | Cusihuiriachi | 052 | Ojinaga | Ojinaga |
| 019 | Chihuahua | Chihuahua | 053 | Práxedis G. Guerrero | Práxedis G. Guerrero |
| 020 | Chínipas | Villa Chínipas de Almada | 054 | Riva Palacio | San Andrés |
| 021 | Delicias | Delicias | 055 | Rosales | Santa Cruz de Rosales |
| 022 | Dr. Belisario Domínguez | San Lorenzo | 056 | Rosario | Valle del Rosario |
| 023 | Galeana | Hermenegildo Galeana | 057 | San Francisco de Borja | San Francisco de Borja |
| 024 | Santa Isabel | Santa Isabel | 058 | San Francisco de Conchos | San Francisco de Conchos |
| 025 | Gómez Farías | Valentín Gómez Farías | 059 | San Francisco del Oro | San Francisco del Oro |
| 026 | Gran Morelos | San Nicolás de Carretas | 060 | Santa Bárbara | Santa Bárbara |
| 027 | Guachochi | Guachochi | 061 | Satevó | Satevó |
| 028 | Guadalupe | Guadalupe | 062 | Saucillo | Saucillo |
| 029 | Guadalupe y Calvo | Guadalupe y Calvo | 063 | Temósachi | Temósachi |
| 030 | Guazapares | Témoris | 064 | El Tule | El Tule |
| 031 | Guerrero | Guerrero | 065 | Urique | Urique |
| 032 | Hidalgo del Parral | Hidalgo del Parral | 066 | Uruachi | Uruachi |
| 033 | Huejotitán | Huejotitán | 067 | Valle de Zaragoza | Valle de Zaragoza |
| 034 | Ignacio Zaragoza | Ignacio Zaragoza | | | |

== Economy ==
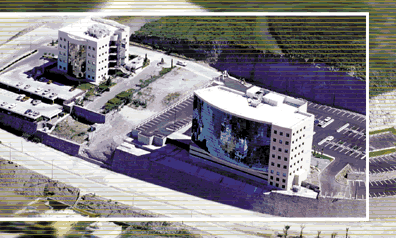
Copachisa is an industrial design and construction company based in the city of Chihuahua, Mexico.

The state has the 9th-largest state economy in Mexico, accounting for 3.69% of the country's GDP. Chihuahua has the fifth highest manufacturing GDP in Mexico and ranks second for the most factories funded by foreign investment in the country. As of 2022, the state had an estimated 1.050 trillion pesos (52.2 billion dollars) of annual GDP. According to official federal statistical studies, the service sector accounted for the largest portion of the state economy at 59.28%; the manufacturing and industrial sector is estimated to account for 34.36% of the state's GDP, with the agricultural sector accounting for 6.36% of the state's GDP. Manufacturing sector was the principal foreign investment in the state followed by the mining sector. In 2011, the state received approximately 884 million dollars in remittances from the United States, which was 4.5% of all remittances from the United States to Mexico.

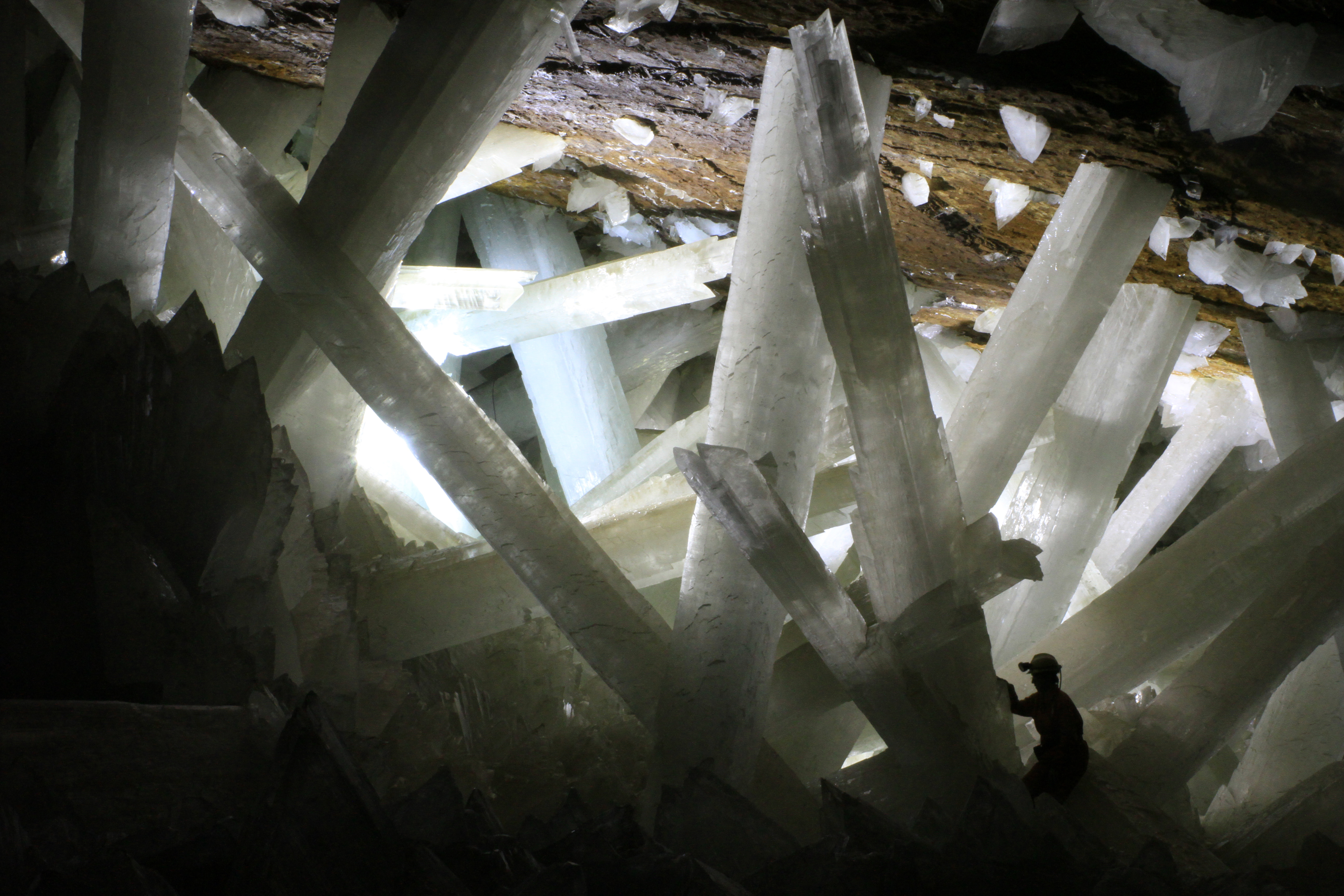
Naica Mine is known for its extraordinary selenite crystals and is a major source of lead, zinc, and silver operated by Industrias Peñoles.

During the 1990s after NAFTA was signed, industrial development grew rapidly with foreign investment. Large factories known as maquiladoras were built to export manufactured goods to the United States and Canada. Today, most of the maquiladoras produce electronics, automobile, and aerospace components. There are more than 406 companies operating under the federal IMMEX or Prosec program in Chihuahua. The large portion of the manufacturing sector of the state is 425 factories divided into 25 industrial parks accounting for 12.47% of the maquiladoras in Mexico, which employ 294,026 people in the state. While export-driven manufacturing is one of the most important components of the state's economy, the industrial sector is quite diverse and can be broken down into several sectors, which are: electronics, agro-industrial, wood base manufacturing, mineral, and biotech. Similar to the rest of the country, small businesses continue to be the foundation of the state's economy. Small business employs the largest portion of the population.

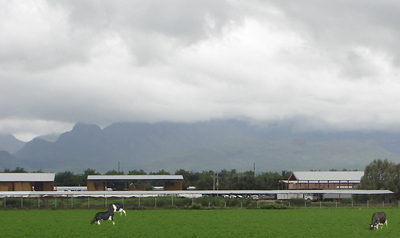
The dairy industry is an important part of the agriculture sector of the economy in the state.

As of 2007, the state's economy employed 786,758 people, which accounted for 3.9% of the country's workforce with annual GDP per capita of 136,417 pesos (12,338 dollars). The average employee wage in Chihuahua is approximately 193 pesos per day. The minimum wage in the state is 61.38 pesos (4.66 dollars) per day except for the municipalities of Guadalupe, Ciudad Juárez, and Praxedis G. Guerrero, which have a minimum wage of 64.76 Mexican pesos (4.92 dollars).

Agriculture is a relatively small component of the state's economy and varies greatly due to the varying climate across the state. The state ranked first in Mexico for the production of the following crops: oats, chile verde, cotton, apples, pecans, and quince. The state has an important dairy industry with large milk processors throughout the state. Delicias is home to Alpura, the second-largest dairy company in Mexico. The state has a large logging industry ranking second in oak and third in pine in Mexico. The mining industry is a small but continues to produce large amounts of minerals. The state ranked first place in the country for the production of lead with 53,169 metric tons. Chihuahua ranked second in Mexico for zinc at 150,211 metric tons, silver at 580,271 kg, and gold at 15,221.8 kg.

== Notable people ==
Category: People from Chihuahua (state)

== Media ==
Newspapers of Chihuahua include: El Diario (Juárez), El Diario de Chihuahua, El Heraldo de Chihuahua, El Heraldo de la Tarde, El Mexicano, El Sol de Parral, and Norte de Ciudad Juárez.

== See also ==
- Chihuahua (dog), a dog breed named after the state
- Geography of Mexico
- Indigenous peoples of Mexico
- Los Medanos, the Samalayuca Dune Fields
- Glanton's gang, a band of mercenaries
- Chihuahuan (disambiguation)
