= EFF Pioneer Award =

Science and engineering award

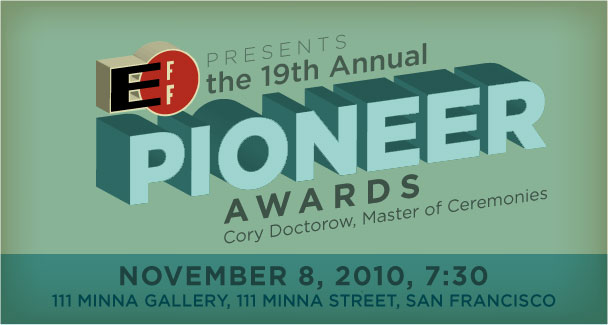
The EFF Pioneer Award

The EFF Award, formerly EFF Pioneer Award, is an annual prize by the Electronic Frontier Foundation (EFF) for people who have made significant contributions to the empowerment of individuals online.

== Winners ==
- 1992: Douglas Engelbart, Robert E. Kahn, Tom Jennings, Jim Warren, Andrzej Smereczynski
- 1993: Paul Baran, Vint Cerf, Ward Christensen, Dave Hughes, USENET developers (accepted by Tom Truscott and Jim Ellis)
- 1994: Ivan Sutherland, Bill Atkinson, Whitfield Diffie and Martin Hellman, Murray Turoff and Starr Roxanne Hiltz, Lee Felsenstein, and the WELL (the Whole Earth 'Lectronic Link)
- 1995: Philip Zimmermann, Anita Borg, Willis Ware
- 1996: Robert Metcalfe, Peter Neumann, Shabbir Safdar and Matt Blaze
- 1997: Hedy Lamarr and George Antheil (special award; posthumous with respect to Antheil), Johan Helsingius, Marc Rotenberg
- 1998: Linus Torvalds, Richard Stallman, Barbara Simons
- 1999: Jon Postel (posthumous award), Drazen Pantic, Simon Davies
- 2000: "Librarians Everywhere" (accepted by Karen G. Schneider), Tim Berners-Lee, Phil Agre
- 2001: Bruce Ennis (attorney) (posthumous award), Seth Finkelstein, Stephanie Perrin
- 2002: Dan Gillmor, Beth Givens, Jon Johansen and Writers of DeCSS
- 2003: Amy Goodman, Eben Moglen, David Sobel
- 2004: Kim Alexander, David L. Dill, Avi Rubin (for security issues with electronic voting)
- 2005: Mitch Kapor, Edward Felten, Patrick Ball
- 2006: Craigslist, Gigi Sohn, Jimmy Wales
- 2007: Yochai Benkler, Cory Doctorow, Bruce Schneier
- 2008: Mozilla Foundation and its chair Mitchell Baker; Michael Geist; and AT&T whistleblower Mark Klein
- 2009: Limor "Ladyada" Fried, Harri Hursti and Carl Malamud
- 2010: Steven Aftergood, James Boyle, Pamela Jones of the Groklaw website and Hari Krishna Prasad Vemuru
- 2011: Ron Wyden, Ian Goldberg, and Nawaat.org
- 2012: Andrew (bunnie) Huang, Jérémie Zimmermann, The Tor Project
- 2013: Aaron Swartz (posthumous award), James Love, Glenn Greenwald and Laura Poitras
- 2014: Frank La Rue, Zoe Lofgren, Trevor Paglen
- 2015: Caspar Bowden (posthumous award), Citizen Lab, Anriette Esterhuysen and the Association for Progressive Communications and Kathy Sierra
- 2016: Malkia Cyril of the Center for Media Justice, data protection activist Max Schrems, the authors of the "Keys Under Doormats" report, and California State Senators Mark Leno and Joel Anderson.
- 2017: Chelsea Manning, Mike Masnick, Annie Game
- 2018: Stephanie Lenz, Joe McNamee (from EDRi), Sarah T. Roberts
- 2019: Danah boyd, Oakland Privacy, William Gibson
- 2020: Joy Buolamwini, Dr. Timnit Gebru, Deborah Raji; Danielle Blunt; Open Technology Fund Community
- 2021: Kade Crockford, Pam Dixon, Matt Mitchell

Name change to EFF Awards:

- 2022: Alaa Abd El-Fattah, Digital Defense Fund, Kyle Wiens
- 2023: Alexandra Asanovna Elbakyan, Library Freedom Project, Signal Foundation
- 2024: Carolina Botero, Connecting Humanity, 404 Media
- 2025: Erie Meyer; Just Futures Law; Software Freedom Law Center, India

== See also ==
- List of computer-related awards
