= Kate Starbird =

American computer scientist and former basketball player

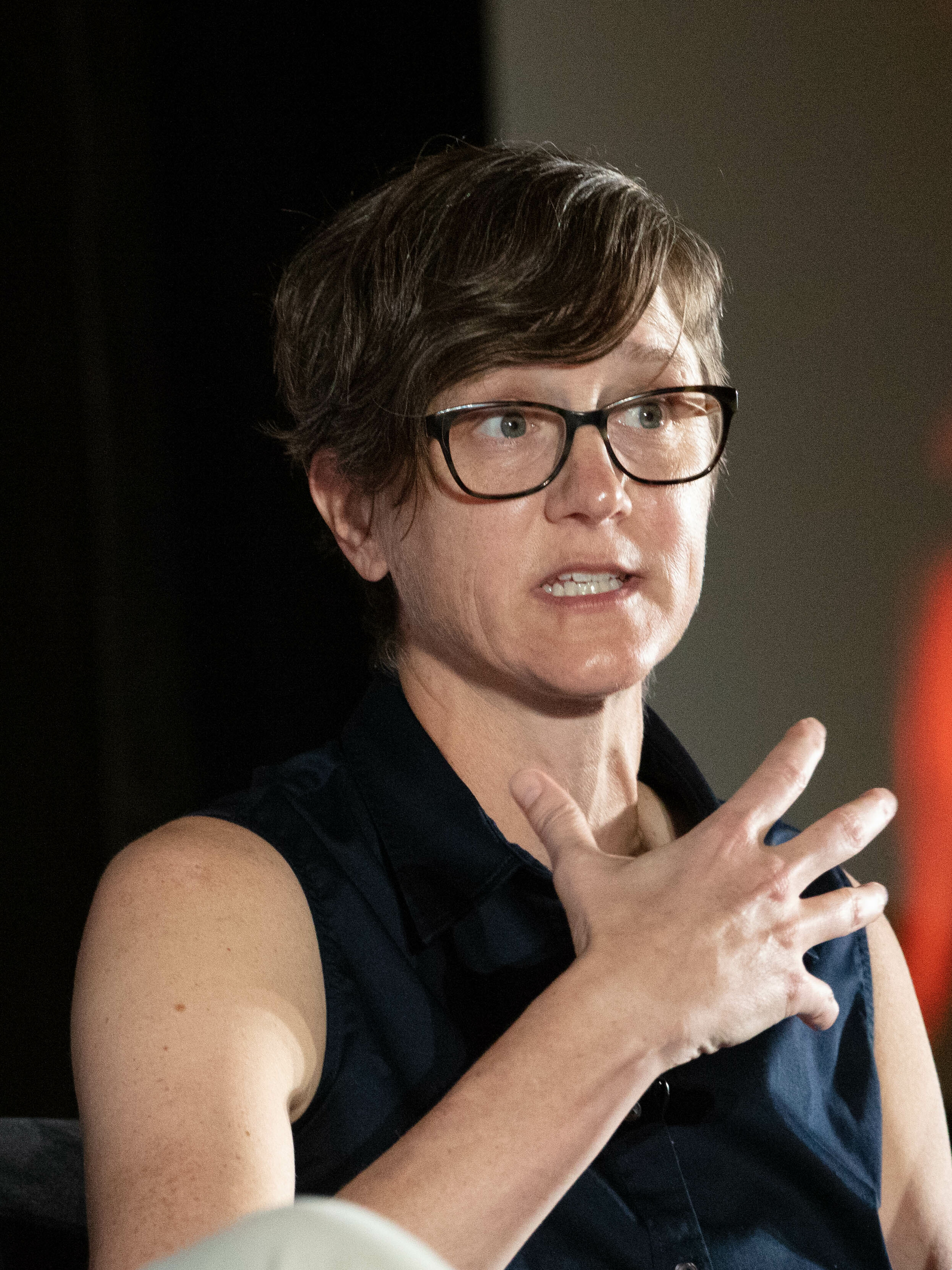
- Born: Catherine Evelyn Starbird; July 30, 1975 (age 51); West Point, New York, U.S.
- Spouse: Melissa Marsh (m. 2008)
- Parent: Margaret Leonard (mother)
- Relatives: Alfred Starbird (grandfather); Charles Leonard (grandfather); George A. Dodd (great-great-grandfather)

Academic background
- Education: Stanford University; University of Colorado Boulder
- Thesis: Crowdwork, Crisis and Convergence: How the Connected Crowd Organizes Information during Mass Disruption Events (2012)
- Doctoral advisor: Leysia Palen

Academic work
- Discipline: Computer science
- Sub-discipline: Human–computer interaction
- Institutions: University of Washington (2012–present)
- Main interests: Crisis informatics
- Basketball career

Personal information
- Listed height: 6 ft 1 in (1.85 m)
- Listed weight: 153 lb (69 kg)

Career information
- High school: Lakes (Lakewood, Washington)
- College: Stanford (1993–1997)
- WNBA draft: 1999: 3rd round, 26th overall pick
- Drafted by: Sacramento Monarchs
- Playing career: 1997–2006
- Position: Shooting guard / small forward
- Number: 30

Career history
- 1997–1998: Seattle Reign
- 1999: Sacramento Monarchs
- 2000–2002: Utah Starzz
- 2001–2002: Saint-Jacques Sport Reims
- 2002: Seattle Storm
- 2003–2005: Adecco Estudiantes Madrid
- 2004: Indiana Fever
- 2005–2006: PDV Ibiza

Career highlights
- Naismith College Player of the Year (1997); WBCA Player of the Year (1997); USBWA National Player of the Year (1997); 2x All-American – Kodak, USBWA (1996, 1997); First-team All-American – AP (1997); Second-team All-American – AP (1996); 2x Pac-10 Player of the Year (1996, 1997); 3x All Pac-10 (1995, 1996, 1997); First-team Parade All-American (1993)

Career statistics
- Points: 373 (3.3 ppg)
- Rebounds: 121 (1.1 rpg)
- Assists: 95 (0.8 apg)
- Stats at Basketball Reference
Medals
Representing United States
World University Games
| Gold medal – first place | 1997 Marsala, Italy | Team competition |

Catherine Evelyn Starbird (born July 30, 1975) is an American computer scientist and former women's professional basketball player.

Playing at the guard position, Starbird earned All-American honors as a high school athlete at Lakes High School in Lakewood, Washington, and later at the collegiate level at Stanford. The 1997 Naismith College Player of the Year, Starbird helped Stanford make three consecutive Final Four appearances from 1995 to 1997 and scored 2,215 career points, a school record that stood for 11 years. From 1997 to 2006, Starbird played professional basketball in the American Basketball League, Women's National Basketball Association, and various European teams.

Having been a computer science major as an undergraduate at Stanford, Starbird completed a doctorate in technology, media, and society at the University of Colorado at Boulder in 2012. Later that year, she joined the faculty of the University of Washington. Her research focuses on disinformation and social media communication during disasters.

== Early life ==
Catherine Evelyn Starbird was born July 30, 1975, in West Point, New York, to a military family. Her father Edward Starbird was a United States Army colonel, and her mother Margaret (née Leonard) was a teacher and author.

Growing up in Tacoma, Washington, Starbird attended Lakes High School in nearby Lakewood. As a senior in 1993, Starbird made the Parade All-American first team and was the Kodak All-America MVP. She was also named Washington Player of the Year by Gatorade and USA Today. At the 1993 Women's Basketball Coaches Association High School All-America Game, she scored 12 points and earned MVP honors.

== College basketball career ==
At Stanford University, Starbird played at guard for the Stanford Cardinal under coach Tara VanDerveer from 1993 to 1997 with NCAA tournament appearances every season, including the Final Four from 1995 to 1997. In her first season in 1993–94, Starbird averaged 9.9 points and 2.9 rebounds and made the Pac-10 All-Freshman team. Starbird had a breakout season in 1994–95 with 16.0 points, 4.2 rebounds, and 4.0 assists and was a first-team All-Pac-10 honoree. Averaging 20.1 points, 4.7 rebounds, and 3.5 assists as a junior in 1995–96, Starbird was the Pac-10's Co-Player of the Year and received multiple All-American honors, specifically first team honors from Kodak, Basketball America magazine, and the United States Basketball Writers Association and second team honors from the Associated Press and United Press International. On January 13, 1996, Starbird scored a career high 44 points against USC.

As a senior in 1996–97, Starbird averaged 20.9 points, 3.7 rebounds, and 3.2 assists and was a first-team Associated Press All-American. Starbird also won the Naismith College Player of the Year, USBWA Women's National Player of the Year award, and WBCA Player of the Year awards.

Upon graduating, Starbird had a program record 2,215 career points. That record would be broken 11 years later in 2008 by Candice Wiggins.

Starbird graduated from Stanford in 1997 with a Bachelor of Science in computer science.

== Career statistics ==
=== WNBA ===
==== Regular season ====
| Year | Team | GP | GS | MPG | FG% | 3P% | FT% | RPG | APG | SPG | BPG | TO | PPG |
|---|---|---|---|---|---|---|---|---|---|---|---|---|---|
| 1999 | Sacramento | 24 | 1 | 9.0 | 21.8 | 13.3 | 81.5 | 1.0 | 0.6 | 0.5 | 0.2 | 0.7 | 2.0 |
| 2000 | Utah | **29** | 0 | 11.7 | 35.8 | 21.7 | 81.0 | 1.1 | 1.0 | 0.4 | **0.4** | 1.0 | 4.0 |
| 2001 | Utah | 23 | **7** | **13.5** | 37.3 | 21.7 | 81.5 | 1.3 | 0.9 | 0.3 | 0.0 | 0.7 | 4.7 |
| 2002 | Utah | 15 | 0 | 5.9 | 40.0 | 25.0 | 57.1 | 0.5 | 0.5 | 0.6 | 0.3 | **0.1** | 1.7 |
| 2002 | Seattle | 9 | 0 | 20.7 | 45.5 | **45.5** | **88.9** | **2.1** | **1.3** | **0.7** | **0.4** | 1.2 | **5.9** |
| 2003 | Did not play (waived) | | | | | | | | | | | | |
| 2004 | Indiana | 12 | 0 | 9.8 | 26.1 | 30.0 | 83.3 | 0.8 | 0.9 | 0.5 | 0.0 | 0.8 | 1.7 |
| Career | 6 years, 4 teams | 112 | 8 | 11.2 | 35.0 | 24.4 | 80.5 | 1.1 | 0.8 | 0.5 | 0.2 | 0.7 | 3.3 |

==== Playoffs ====
| Year | Team | GP | GS | MPG | FG% | 3P% | FT% | RPG | APG | SPG | BPG | TO | PPG |
|---|---|---|---|---|---|---|---|---|---|---|---|---|---|
| 1999 | Sacramento | 1 | 0 | **16.0** | 20.0 | 0.0 | 0.0 | **2.0** | 0.0 | 0.0 | **1.0** | 2.0 | 2.0 |
| 2001 | Utah | 1 | 0 | 2.0 | 0.0 | 0.0 | 0.0 | 0.0 | 0.0 | 0.0 | 0.0 | **0.0** | 0.0 |
| 2002 | Seattle | **2** | 0 | 11.5 | **50.0** | **100.0** | **100.0** | 1.5 | **0.5** | **0.5** | 0.5 | 2.0 | **2.5** |
| Career | 3 years, 3 teams | 4 | 0 | 10.3 | 25.0 | 33.3 | 100.0 | 1.3 | 0.3 | 0.3 | 0.5 | 1.5 | 1.8 |

=== College ===
Legend
| GP | Games played | GS | Games started | MPG | Minutes per game |
| FG% | Field goal percentage | 3P% | 3-point field goal percentage | FT% | Free throw percentage |
| RPG | Rebounds per game | APG | Assists per game | SPG | Steals per game |
| BPG | Blocks per game | PPG | Points per game | **Bold** | Career high |

| Year | Team | GP | Points | FG% | 3P% | FT% | RPG | APG | SPG | BPG | PPG |
|---|---|---|---|---|---|---|---|---|---|---|---|
| 1993–94 | Stanford | 31 | 308 | 50.0% | **50.0%** | 83.1% | 2.9 | 2.6 | 1.3 | 0.5 | 9.9 |
| 1994–95 | Stanford | 32 | 511 | **52.4%** | 39.2% | 74.3% | 4.2 | **4.0** | **2.7** | 0.6 | 16.0 |
| 1995–96 | Stanford | 32 | 643 | 47.2% | 34.5% | **84.7%** | **4.7** | 3.5 | 2.1 | **0.7** | 20.1 |
| 1996–97 | Stanford | **36** | **753** | 51.1% | 42.5% | 82.2% | 3.7 | 3.2 | 1.6 | 0.4 | **20.9** |
| Career | | 131 | 2215 | 50.1% | 39.2% | 81.5% | 3.9 | 3.3 | 1.9 | 0.5 | 16.9 |

== International basketball career ==
Starbird represented the US at the 1997 World University Games held in Marsala, Sicily, Italy in August 1997. The USA team won all six games, earning the gold medal at the event. Starbird averaged 8.7 points per game.

== Professional basketball career ==
After college, she was selected by the Seattle Reign with the fourth overall pick in the 1997 ABL draft. In two seasons with the Reign, Starbird played in 59 games and averaged 12.9 points, 2.8 rebounds, and 2.8 assists. The ABL shut down and filed for bankruptcy in late December 1998.

In 1999, the Sacramento Monarchs selected Starbird in the third round (26th overall) in the WNBA draft. Starbird played in 24 games with one start for the Monarchs in 1999, averaging 2.0 points and 1.0 rebounds.

During the 2000 expansion draft on December 15, 1999, Starbird was selected by the Miami Sol. She was then traded her and a 2000 first-round pick to the Utah Starzz for Elena Baranova and a 2000 second-round pick. Starbird averaged 4.0 points in 2000 and 4.7 points in 2001 with the Starzz. Starbird played professional basketball in Europe during the two offseasons, in France in 2000–01 and Austria in 2001–02.

In 2002, Starbird averaged 1.7 points in 15 games for the Starzz before being traded to the Seattle Storm for Semeka Randall. With the Storm, Starbird averaged a career high 5.9 points. The Storm waived Starbird prior to the 2003 season.

In the 2003–04 offseason, Starbird played in 14 games for the Spanish team Adecco Estudiantes Madrid, averaging 18.7 points and 5.1 rebounds. Starbird played her final year in the WNBA with the Indiana Fever in 2004, averaging 1.7 points and 0.8 rebounds.

After the 2004 WNBA season, Starbird returned to Estudiantes. She played for PDV Ibiza during the 2005–06 season.

== Academic career ==
Starbird earned a National Science Foundation Graduate Research Fellowship in 2009. Studying in the Alliance of Technology, Learning, And Society (A.T.L.A.S.) program, she received her Ph.D. in technology, media, and society at the University of Colorado Boulder in 2012; her thesis was titled "Crowdwork, Crisis and Convergence: How the Connected Crowd Organizes Information during Mass Disruption Events."

Beginning in September 2012, she was a faculty member of the University of Washington Department of Human Centered Design & Engineering, where she directs the Emerging Capacities of Mass Participation (emCOMP) lab. In 2019, Starbird was promoted to associate professor.

She studies educational possibilities of social media as well as crisis informatics. Her research sits at the intersection of computer science and social science and falls within the fields of Human-Computer Interaction (HCI) and Computer-Supported Cooperative Work (CSCW). Using a combination of empirical methods, including qualitative, computational and network analysis, Starbird examines both small group and large scale interaction online within the context of disasters and other mass disruption events, studying how digital volunteers and other members of the crowd work to filter and shape the information space. One of the shooting events Starbird documented was the attack at the Pulse nightclub in Orlando. In another research project, her analysis of a dataset of 600,000 tweets about the Deepwater Horizon oil spill in the Gulf of Mexico helped to put together a map of how information was shared among those close to the event and more broadly.

In 2024, the Special Interest Group on Computer–Human Interaction (SIGCHI) awarded Starbird with the 2024 SIGCHI Societal Impact Award which "recognizes mid-career or senior individuals who work to address social issues through human-computer interaction."

Starbird was named to the 2025 class of ACM Fellows, "for contributions to understanding and improving information ecosystems, including during crisis events and addressing misinformation".

== Personal life ==
Starbird's grandfather Alfred Dodd Starbird was an Olympic athlete who was an Army general during World War II. Grandfather Charles Leonard was an Olympic silver medalist and the first Olympian with a perfect pistol shooting score. Great-great-grandfather George A. Dodd was an Army officer who fought in the Battle of Guerrero.

In 2008, Starbird married Melissa Marsh. Starbird said in a 2011 interview with ESPN the Magazine that she never considered a career in coaching basketball due to concerns that she would need to be closeted.

Besides basketball, Starbird has also played Gaelic football. In 2007, she managed the Seattle Gaels women's Gaelic football team.
