= Alfred Starbird =

Alfred Starbird is the name of two individuals who served as United States Army general officers.

- Alfred A. Starbird (1875–1956), US Army brigadier general, father of Alfred D. Starbird
- Alfred D. Starbird (1912–1983), athlete and US Army lieutenant general, son of Alfred A. Starbird
