= Hiltz =

Hiltz is a surname. Notable people with the surname include:

- Fred Hiltz, Primate of the Anglican Church of Canada
- Nichole Hiltz (born 1978), American actress
- Nikki Hiltz (born 1994), American middle-distance runner
- Starr Roxanne Hiltz, Professor of Information Science/Information Systems at New Jersey Institute of Technology
- W. W. Hiltz, Mayor of Toronto in 1924
