= Los Angeles Police Department v. United Reporting Publishing Corp. =

- Supreme Court of the United States

Argued October 13, 1999 Decided December 7, 1999
- Full case name: Los Angeles Police Department v. United Reporting Publishing Corporation
- Docket no.: 98-678
- Citations: 528 U.S. 32 (more) 120 S. Ct. 2228, 145 L. Ed. 2d 451
- Argument: Oral argument
- Decision: Opinion

Case history
- Prior: Summary judgment granted, United Reporting Publishing Corp. v. Lungren, 946 F. Supp. 2d 922 (S.D. Calif. 1996); Affirmed sub nom. United Reporting Publishing Corp v. California Highway Patrol, 146 F.3d 1133 (9th Cir. 1998); Cert. granted, 525 U. S. 1121 (1999)

Questions presented
- Whether a law, that allowed access to addresses of arrestees and crime victims only to persons who would use the addresses for scholarly, journalistic, political, or governmental purposes, or to private investigators, violated the First Amendment.

Holding
- A law that restricts the disclosure of addresses of arrestees and crime victims only to persons who will use the records for noncommercial purposes is not facially invalid.

Court membership
- Chief Justice William Rehnquist Associate Justices John P. Stevens · Sandra Day O'Connor; Antonin Scalia · Anthony Kennedy; David Souter · Clarence Thomas; Ruth Bader Ginsburg · Stephen Breyer

Case opinions
- Majority: Rehnquist, joined by O’Connor, Scalia, Souter, Thomas, Ginsburg, Breyer
- Concurrence: Scalia, joined by Thomas
- Concurrence: Ginsburg, joined by O’Connor, Souter, Breyer
- Dissent: Stevens, joined by Kennedy

Laws applied
- U.S. Const. amend. I California Govt. Code Ann. § 6254(f)(3) (West Supp. 1999)

Los Angeles Police Department v. United Reporting Publishing Corp., 528 U.S. 32 (1999), was a case in which the Supreme Court of the United States upheld a California statute that allowed law enforcement agencies to disclose the addresses of arrestees and crime victims only to persons who intended to use the addresses for “for a scholarly, journalistic, political, or governmental purpose, or that the request is made for investigation purposes by a licensed private investigator.”

United Reporting Publishing Corp., which was in the business of selling arrestees’ addresses to private businesses for a profit, argued that such a law unconstitutionally restricted commercial speech and was therefore unconstitutional. Both the United States District Court for the Southern District of California and the Ninth Circuit Court of Appeals agreed, and issued injunctions against enforcement of the law.

But the U.S. Supreme Court reversed. The Supreme Court held that because the Constitution did not require law enforcement agencies to release such information at all, and the law did not prohibit speech about information that the speaker already had, the law was constitutional.

== Background ==
=== History ===
Prior to 1996, the United Reporting Publishing Corporation regularly obtained, from law enforcement agencies, the names and addresses of people who had been arrested. United then sold these addresses to attorneys, insurance companies, alcohol and drug abuse counselors, and driving schools.

In 1995, the California legislature passed a new statute which required that anyone who sought the address of an arrestee or a crime victim had to sign a statement, under penalty of perjury, that the person requesting the address was going to use the address “for a scholarly, journalistic, political, or governmental purpose, or that the request is made for investigation purposes by a licensed private investigator”. The statute also prohibited anyone who obtained the address of an arrestee or crime victim from using the address to sell a product or service.

=== Lower courts ===
Before the law went into effect, United Reporting Publishing filed suit in the United States District Court for the Southern District of California. United Reporting Publishing stated that, because of the nature of their business, they could not sign a statement that they would only use the address for scholarly, journalistic, political, governmental, or private investigative purposes. Also, United Reporting Publishing sold addresses to its customers. Therefore, United Reporting Publishing argued that the law effectively barred them from receiving arrestees’ or victims’ addresses. Thus, United Reporting Publishing contended that the law was unconstitutional under the First Amendment, because the law restricted the free flow of information to United Reporting Publishing.

The District Court issued an injunction prohibiting the state of California from enforcing the law. The District Court held:

“Functionally, this is a limitation on commercial speech. The government is the only source of this information and by statute is disseminating it to everyone except commercial users. The government cannot denominate this a limitation on access in order to achieve a limitation on non-preferred speech. This limitation on access constitutes an indirect limitation on commercial speech.”

The District Court held that because the statute indirectly limited commercial speech, the statute violated the First Amendment.

The state appealed to the Ninth Circuit, who affirmed the District Court's ruling. The Ninth Circuit analyzed the case under the rubric of Central Hudson Gas & Electric Corp. v. Public Service Commission, which is the leading U.S. Supreme Court case on commercial speech. Central Hudson Gas held that any regulation of commercial speech is subject to the following four part analysis:

1) Whether the First Amendment protects the commercial speech at issue

2) Whether the government's interest in restricting the speech is substantial

3) Whether the regulation directly advances the government's interest

4) Whether the regulation is not more extensive than needed to serve the government's interest.

The Ninth Circuit held that the First Amendment protected United Reporting Publishing's speech. The Ninth Circuit also held that the government has a substantial interest in protecting arrestees’ privacy. However, the Ninth Circuit held that the statute did not directly advance the government's interest in protect8ing arrestees’ privacy. The Ninth Circuit wrote:

“The fact that journalists, academicians, curiosity seekers, and other noncommercial users may peruse and report on arrestee records, the district court observed, belies the LAPD's claim that the statute is actually intended to protect the privacy interests of arrestees. ... Instead, it appears to be more directed at preventing solicitation practices.”

The Ninth Circuit then quoted the District Court's decision below, which stated, “It is hard to see how direct mail solicitations invade the privacy of arrestees. If they don't like the solicitation, they can simply throw it away."

Because the Ninth Circuit found that the statute did not directly advance the state's interest in protecting the privacy of arrestees, the Ninth Circuit held that law unconstitutional under the First Amendment.

The Los Angeles Police Department appealed to the U.S. Supreme Court, which granted certiorari.

== Opinion of the court ==
=== Arguments ===
Tom Goldstein argued the case for the Los Angeles Police Department. With him on the brief were David Boies, James Hahn, and Frederick N. Merkin. Bruce Ennis argued the case for United Reporting Publishing. With him on the brief were Guylin R. Cummins and Marcelle E. Mihaila. The United States federal government, as well as the states of New York, California, Colorado, Delaware, Hawaii, Idaho, Iowa, Louisiana, Nevada, Ohio, South Carolina, and Washington, all filed briefs in support of the Los Angeles Police Department. The Direct Marketing Association, the Individual Reference Services Group, Investigative Reports and Editors, Inc., the Newsletter Publishers Association, the Reporters Committee for Freedom of the Press, and the Washington Legal Foundation, all filed briefs in support of United Reporting Publishing.

The Los Angeles Police Department argued that the statute did not abridge anyone's right to free speech, but that the law merely regulated access to information that the police department held. United Reporting Publishing argued that the law was “facially invalid” because the law “discriminates between speakers in order to reduce the amount of commercial speech.” United Reporting Publishing argued that the law was “overbroad” because the law could chill certain constitutionally protected speech.

=== Opinions ===
==== Majority opinion ====
Chief Justice William H. Rehnquist delivered the opinion of the Court. The Court held that the statute in question did not violate the First Amendment. The Court stated:

“This is not a case in which the government is prohibiting a speaker from conveying information that the speaker already possesses. ... The California statute in question merely requires that if respondent wishes to obtain the addresses of arrestees it must qualify under the statute to do so. Respondent did not attempt to qualify and was therefore denied access to the addresses. For purposes of assessing the propriety of a facial invalidation, what we have before us is nothing more than a governmental denial of access to information in its possession. California could decide not to give out arrestee information at all without violating the First Amendment.”

The court observed that because the First Amendment did not require law enforcement agencies to provide arrestees’ and victims’ information to the public at all, it did not violate the First Amendment to restrict disclosure to a certain class of persons. The Court rejected United Reporting Publishing's overbreadth argument. The court quoted New York v. Ferber, which held that "a person to whom a statute may constitutionally be applied may not challenge that statute on the ground that it may conceivably be applied unconstitutionally to others in situations not before the Court." Quoting Broadrick v. Oklahoma, the court noted that although in the past, it had allowed overbreadth challenges based on the First Amendment in the past, the overbreadth doctrine was “strong medicine” and “should be used only as a last resort.” The court therefore held that the statute was not facially invalid. The court also observed that United Reporting Publishing faced no threat of prosecution or denial of funding; therefore, there was less need to challenge the statute as facially invalid.

==== Scalia's concurrence ====
Justice Antonin Scalia, joined by Justice Clarence Thomas concurred. Scalia's reasoning was that “the fact that the statute is formally nothing but a restriction upon access to government information is determinative.”

==== Ginburg's concurrence ====
Justice Ruth Bader Ginsburg wrote a separate concurrence, joined by Justices Sandra Day O’Connor, David Souter, and Stephen Breyer. Ginsburg opined that the case “is properly analyzed as a restriction on access to government information, not as a restriction on protected speech.” Ginsburg further stated:

“Throughout its argument, respondent assumes that § 6254(f)(3)'s regime of selective disclosure burdens speech in the sense of reducing the total flow of information. Whether that is correct is far from clear and depends on the point of comparison. If California were to publish the names and addresses of arrestees for everyone to use freely, it would indeed be easier to speak to and about arrestees than it is under the present system. But if States were required to choose between keeping proprietary information to themselves and making it available without limits, States might well choose the former option. In that event, disallowing selective disclosure would lead not to more speech overall but to more secrecy and less speech. As noted above, this consideration could not justify limited disclosures that discriminated on the basis of viewpoint or some other proscribed criterion. But it does suggest that society's interest in the free flow of information might argue for upholding laws like the one at issue in this case rather than imposing an all-or-nothing regime under which "nothing" could be a State's easiest response.”

==== Dissent ====
Justice John Paul Stevens, joined with Justice Anthony Kennedy, dissented. Justice Stevens wrote,

“A different, and more difficult, question is presented when the State makes information generally available, but denies access to a small disfavored class. In this case, the State is making the information available to scholars, news media, politicians, and others, while denying access to a narrow category of persons solely because they intend to use the information for a constitutionally protected purpose. As Justice Ginsburg points out, if the State identified the disfavored persons based on their viewpoint, or political affiliation, for example, the discrimination would clearly be invalid. See ante, at 43 (concurring opinion). What the State did here, in my opinion, is comparable to that obviously unconstitutional discrimination. In this case, the denial of access is based on the fact that respondent plans to publish the information to others who, in turn, intend to use it for a commercial speech purpose that the State finds objectionable. Respondent's proposed publication of the information is indisputably lawful—petitioner concedes that if respondent independently acquires the data, the First Amendment protects its right to communicate it to others. Brief for Petitioner 27; see also Cox Broadcasting Corp. v. Cohn, 420 U. S. 469, 496 (1975). Similarly, the First Amendment supports the third parties' use of it for commercial speech purposes. See Shapero v. Kentucky Bar Assn., 486 U. S. 466, 472 (1988). Thus, because the State's discrimination is based on its desire to prevent the information from being used for constitutionally protected purposes, I think it must assume the burden of justifying its conduct.”

== Subsequent developments ==
In United States v. Sineneng-Smith (a challenge to a law restricting speech that encouraged illegal immigration) and in United States v. Williams (a challenge to a law criminalizing the possession and distribution of child pornography), the Supreme Court cited Los Angeles Police Department v. United Reporting Publishing Corp. to support the doctrine that an overbreadth challenge should only be used as a last resort. In both of those cases, the respondent had challenged a law as overbroad, and the court rejected the overbreadth challenge in both cases.

In McBurney v. Young, the court cited Los Angeles Police Department v. United Reporting Publishing Corp. to support the principle that the Constitution did not require the existence of Freedom of Information Act (FOIA) laws. In McBurney, Virginia had a law that allowed residents of Virginia access to public records, but did not allow non-Virginia residents to access these records. This law, like the law in Los Angeles Police Department v. United Reporting Publishing Corp. allowed certain persons but not other to access public records; the court cited Los Angeles Police Department v. United Reporting Publishing Corp. and upheld the statute in McBurney as well.

The Court distinguished Los Angeles Police Department v. United Reporting Publishing Corp. in Sorrell v. IMS Health Inc. Sorrell involved a challenge to a Vermont law that prohibited the sale, disclosure, and use of pharmacy records the reveal doctors’ prescribing practices. Vermont had cited Los Angeles Police Department v. United Reporting Publishing Corp. in support of its contention that the law was constitutional. However, the Court held that Los Angeles Police Department v. United Reporting Publishing Corp. did not apply to Sorrell, because Los Angeles Police Department v. United Reporting Publishing Corp. made it clear that it was not "a case in which the government is prohibiting a speaker from conveying information that the speaker already possesses." However, in Sorrell, Vermont was attempted to prohibit speakers from conveying information which the speakers’ possessed, and so the Vermont law violated the First Amendment.

The statute at issue in this case is still in force today.

The United Reporting Publishing Corp. still exists today. It still obtains arrest records from California law enforcement agencies. It has rebranded itself as a publisher of arrest news, in order to comply with the requirement that arrestee data be used “for a scholarly, journalistic, political, or governmental purpose.”
