= Guerrero Municipality =

Guerrero Municipality may refer to:

- Guerrero Municipality, Chihuahua
- Guerrero Municipality, Coahuila
- Guerrero Municipality, Tamaulipas
