= Alfred D. Starbird =

United States Army general and modern pentathlete (1912–1983)

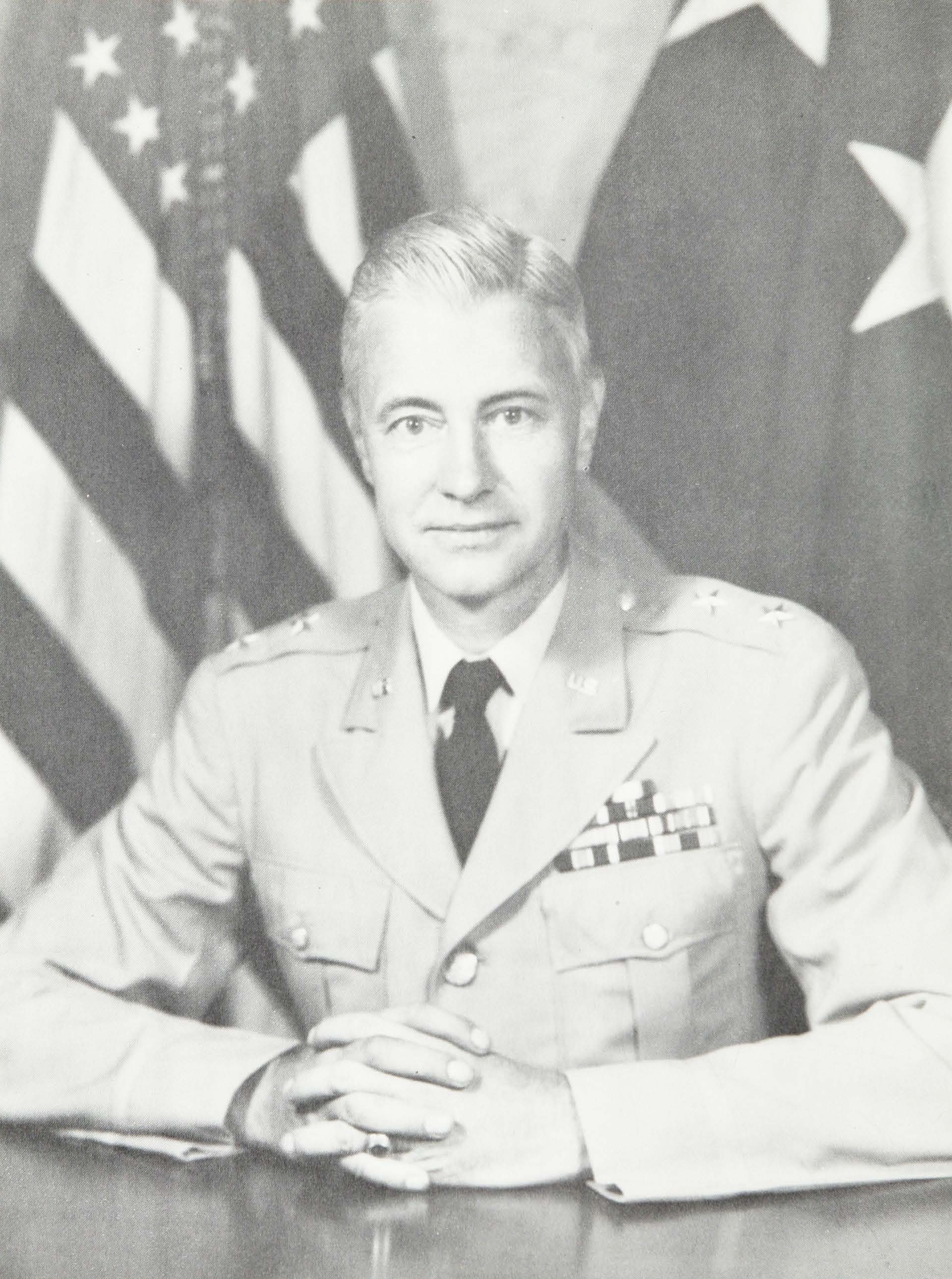
- Starbird as Division Engineer, North Pacific Division c. 1961
- Born: April 28, 1912; Fort Sill, Oklahoma, US
- Died: July 28, 1983 (aged 71); Washington, District of Columbia, US
- Burial place: Arlington National Cemetery
- Military career
- Allegiance: United States
- Branch: United States Army
- Service years: 1933–1971
- Rank: Lieutenant General
- Service number: 0-18961
- Unit: Corps of Engineers
- Commands: Defense Communications Agency; Joint Task Force 8; 1135th Engineer Combat Group
- Conflicts: World War II; Operation Torch; Operation Overlord; Western Allied invasion of Germany; Vietnam War
- Awards: Distinguished Service Medal (4); Legion of Merit (2); Bronze Star (2); Commendation Medal; Order of the Patriotic War Second Class (Union of Soviet Socialist Republics); Secretary of Defense Meritorious Civilian Service Award
- Sports career
- Sport: Modern pentathlon

Sports achievements and titles
- Olympic finals: 1936 Summer Olympics

Alfred Dodd Starbird (April 28, 1912 – July 28, 1983) was an American modern pentathlete, lieutenant general, and authority on nuclear weaponry. A graduate of the United States Military Academy at West Point, New York, class of 1933, he was commissioned in the United States Army Corps of Engineers. He was a member of the United States modern pentathlon team at the 1936 Summer Olympics, finishing seventh overall in a field of 42.

During World War II, Starbird served in the Operations Division of the War Department General Staff. He was an observer at landings at Oran and Normandy. In the latter part of the war in Europe, he commanded the 1135th Engineer Combat Group, which supported the assault crossing of the Rhine, and built bridges over the Danube.

From 1955 to 1961, Starbird was Director of Military Applications of the Atomic Energy Commission. He commanded Joint Task Force 8 in the conduct the Operation Dominic series of nuclear tests in 1962, was director of the Defense Communications Agency from 1962 to 1967, and director of the Sentinel program from 1967 to 1971.

After retiring from the Army in 1971, Starbird was director of the newly created Office of Test and Evaluation in the Department of Defense (DOD) from 1971 to 1975, and assistant administrator for National Security in the Energy Research and Development Administration (ERDA) from 1975 to 1977. In 1977, ERDA became part of the new Department of Energy (DOE), and he became its acting secretary for Defense Programs. He retired in 1980.

== Early life and education ==
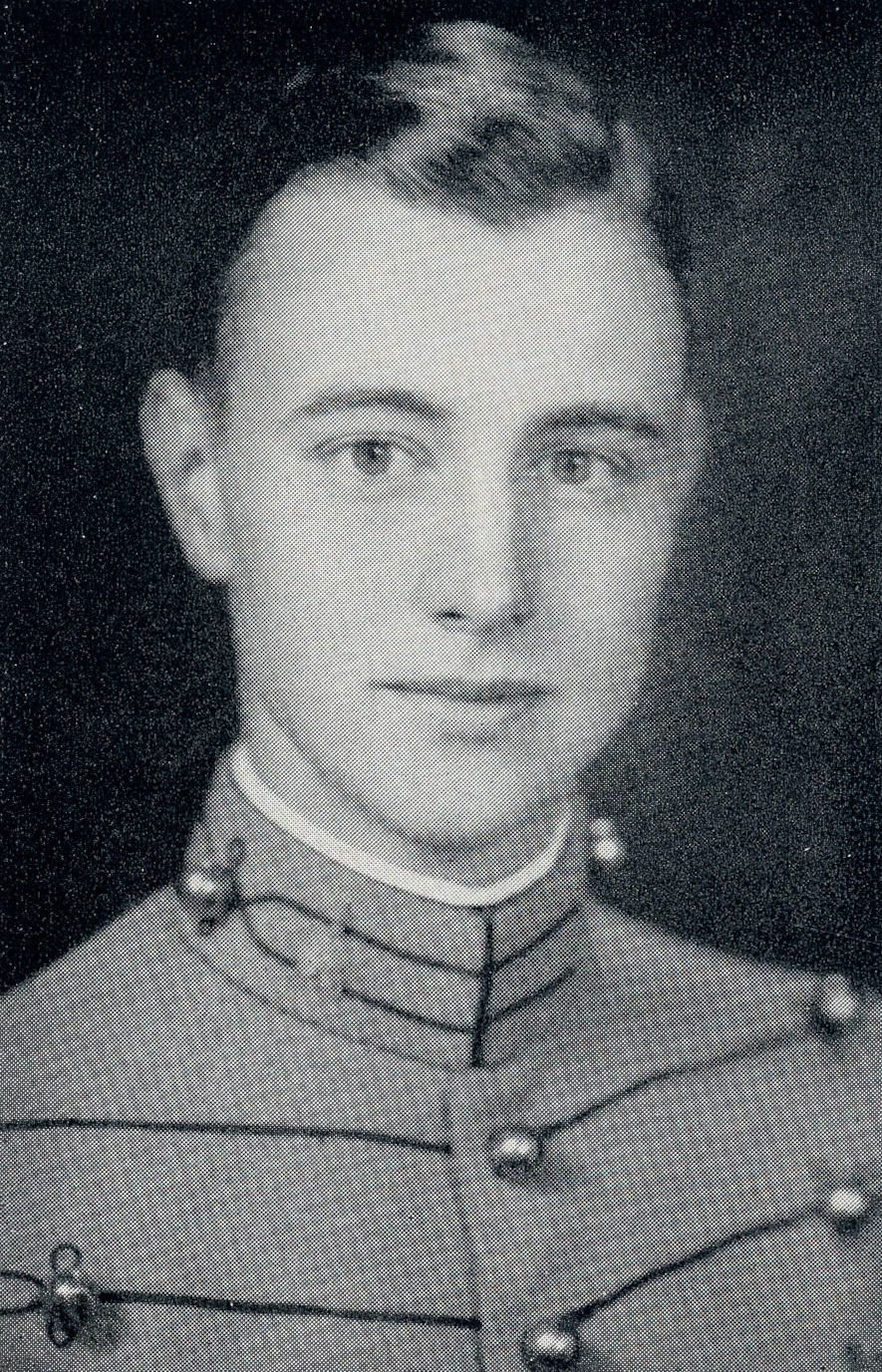
Starbird as a United States Military Academy cadet c. 1933

Alfred Dodd Starbird was born in Fort Sill, Oklahoma, on April 28, 1912, the son of Brigadier General Alfred A. Starbird and his wife, Ethel Dodd Starbird, the daughter of Brigadier General George A. Dodd. He had two sisters, Catharine (Kaye) and Ethel. His family called him by his middle name, Dodd.

On July 1, 1929, Starbird entered the United States Military Academy at West Point, New York. Although one of the younger members of his class, he was 6 feet 5 inches (1.96 m) tall, and distinguished himself in sports. He was captain of the cross country running team and also played basketball. He graduated 5th of 347 with the class of 1933, and, as was normal for high-ranking graduates, he was commissioned as a second lieutenant in the United States Army Corps of Engineers. He was posted to the 5th Engineer Regiment at Camp Humphreys, Virginia, until February 1, 1935, and then to the 13th Engineer Regiment at Fort Belvoir (as Camp Humphreys had been renamed) until June 15, 1935.

== Olympic Games ==
Starbird, who was promoted to first lieutenant on June 12, 1936, was detached to join the United States modern pentathlon team at the 1936 Summer Olympics. He finished equal seventh in the cross country running, equal eighth in the fencing and show jumping, 20th in the swimming and 23rd in the shooting, and finished seventh overall in a field of 42. Although the United States team was placed first, he did not receive a gold medal, as medals were not awarded to modern pentathlon teams until 1952. Returning to the United States on August 23, 1936, Starbird entered Princeton University, from which he received a Master of Science degree in Civil Engineering on July 1, 1937.

After attending the officers' course at the Engineer School at Fort Belvoir, he returned to West Point as an instructor in Civil and Military Engineering on June 5, 1938. He married Evelyn Wallington at Fort Myer, Virginia, where her father was stationed, in June 1939. They had three children: Edward, Susan and Catharine.

== World War II ==
During World War II, Starbird was promoted to captain in the Army of the United States on September 9, 1940, and major on February 1, 1942. On May 22, 1942, he was posted to the Operations Division of the War Department General Staff, the U.S. Army's global command post, working in its European section.

For Operation Torch, the Allied invasion of French North Africa, he was attached to the staff of the 1st Infantry Division as the War Department observer from October 20 to November 23, 1942, for its landing at Oran. He was promoted to lieutenant colonel in the Army of the United States on November 28, 1942, and captain in the Corps of Engineers on June 13, 1943. He represented the Operations Division at the Quebec Conference in August 1943 as an expert on the European Theater of Operations.

During Operation Overlord, the invasion of Normandy, he was again a War Department observer, this time with V Corps headquarters from May 20 to June 13, 1944. For this service he was awarded the Bronze Star Medal. Returning to the Operations Division, he was promoted to colonel in the Army of the United States on December 16, 1944. For his services with the Operations Division, he was awarded the Distinguished Service Medal.

On January 1, 1945, Starbird assumed command of the 1135th Engineer Combat Group. The 1135th Engineer Combat Group supported the XII Corps assault crossing of the Rhine River on March 22 and 23, 1945. For this operation 18 engineer units were attached to 1135th Engineer Combat Group, and Starbird had the services of 600 storm boats and 300 assault boats. The 1135th Engineer Combat Group built a pontoon bridge over the Danube River on May 4 and then a treadway bridge on May 6. Starbird was awarded the Legion of Merit, a second Bronze Star Medal and the Order of the Patriotic War Second Class from the Union of Soviet Socialist Republics. He returned to the Operations Division on June 1, 1945.

== Nuclear weapons ==
On July 17, 1946, Starbird was posted to Hawaii as the deputy chief of staff of United States Army Pacific. He was then seconded to Joint Task Force 7, a special force formed for the Operation Sandstone nuclear tests at Eniwetok Atoll in the Pacific in 1948. His appointment as a colonel in the Army of the United States was terminated on June 30, 1947, and he reverted to his permanent rank of captain. He was promoted to major in the Corps of Engineers on July 15, 1948. On April 1, 1949, he returned to Washington, D.C., where he worked for a year with the Weapons Systems Evaluation Group. Starbird did not complete the professional education typical of senior officers, but based on his World War II experience, he received equivalent credit for attending the Armed Forces Staff College.

Starbird joined the Supreme Headquarters Allied Powers Europe in Paris when it was formed in 1951. He then returned to Washington, D.C., for a two-year tour in the Office of the Chief of Engineers. He was promoted to brigadier general in 1955. From 1955 to 1961, he was Director of Military Applications of the Atomic Energy Commission. At this time, great technical progress was being made in nuclear weapons technology, and atomic bombs and hydrogen bombs were coming into service in large numbers. He wrote voluminous reports on complex, technical issues. He advised the Atomic Energy Commission on nuclear disarmament issues, and a proposed moratorium on nuclear testing, and warned the Commission about the amount of fallout that could be expected from the Operation Hardtack I nuclear tests, and recommended the use of underground nuclear weapons testing.

In 1961, Starbird returned to duty with the Corps of Engineers as chief engineer of the North Pacific Division, supervising large military and civil construction projects in Portland, Oregon. In December 1961, he was suddenly ordered to take command of Joint Task Force 8 and conduct the Operation Dominic series of nuclear tests. For this, he was awarded an oak leaf cluster to his Distinguished Service Medal. His citation read:

The success and productivity of this most complex and urgent program transcended all previous efforts in the history of United States nuclear testing and significantly enhanced the security of the nation and the free world.

Starbird served as director of the Defense Communications Agency from 1962 to 1967. On June 15, 1966, he was designated commander of Joint Task Force 728, and made directly responsible to the Secretary of Defense, Robert McNamara. Starbird was given until September 1967 to build the McNamara Line, an electronic surveillance system intended to detect infiltration of South Vietnam by NVA forces from North Vietnam and Laos. The project was given the highest national priority, and Starbird was sent to South Vietnam to confer with General William Westmoreland. Considered by its critics to be symbolic of McNamara's management, in that it was expensive, valued technology over experience, and was generally ineffective, the barrier was never completed, and by March 1969 was shelved. Starbird received a second oak leaf cluster to his Distinguished Service Medal for this work. His final assignment was as director of the Sentinel program, an anti-ballistic missile system. He retired from the military in 1971. He was awarded a third oak leaf cluster to his Distinguished Service Medal, and an oak leaf cluster to his Legion of Merit.

In 1971, Starbird became director of the newly created Office of Test and Evaluation in the Department of Defense (DOD). In 1975, he was appointed the assistant administrator for National Security in the ERDA, the successor to the Atomic Energy Commission. In 1977, ERDA became part of the new Department of Energy (DOE), and he became its acting secretary for Defense Programs. He retired, only to be recalled to become director of the Joint DOD/DOE Long Range Resource Planning Group. He finally retired in 1980. As a civilian, he received an Atomic Energy Commission citation and gold medal for Commendatory Service in 1970, the Secretary of Defense Meritorious Civilian Service Award in 1975 and the ERDA Citation in 1977.

Starbird died of cancer at Walter Reed Hospital on July 28, 1983. His son Edward graduated with West Point class of 1962, and rose to become a colonel in the Corps of Engineers. Edward married Margaret Leonard, the daughter of Starbird's 1936 modern pentathlon teammate Charles F. Leonard Jr. Their son, Starbird's grandson, Charles D. Starbird graduated with the class of 1990, and granddaughter Kate Starbird is a former professional basketball player in the Women's National Basketball Association (WNBA) and the American Basketball League (ABL), and a faculty member at the University of Washington.
