= Turoff =

Turoff is a surname. Notable people with the surname include:

- Murray Turoff (1936–2022), American computer science professor
- Nico Turoff (1899–1978), Ukrainian boxer and actor
- Allan Turoff (fl. 1970s), inventor of the word game, Boggle
