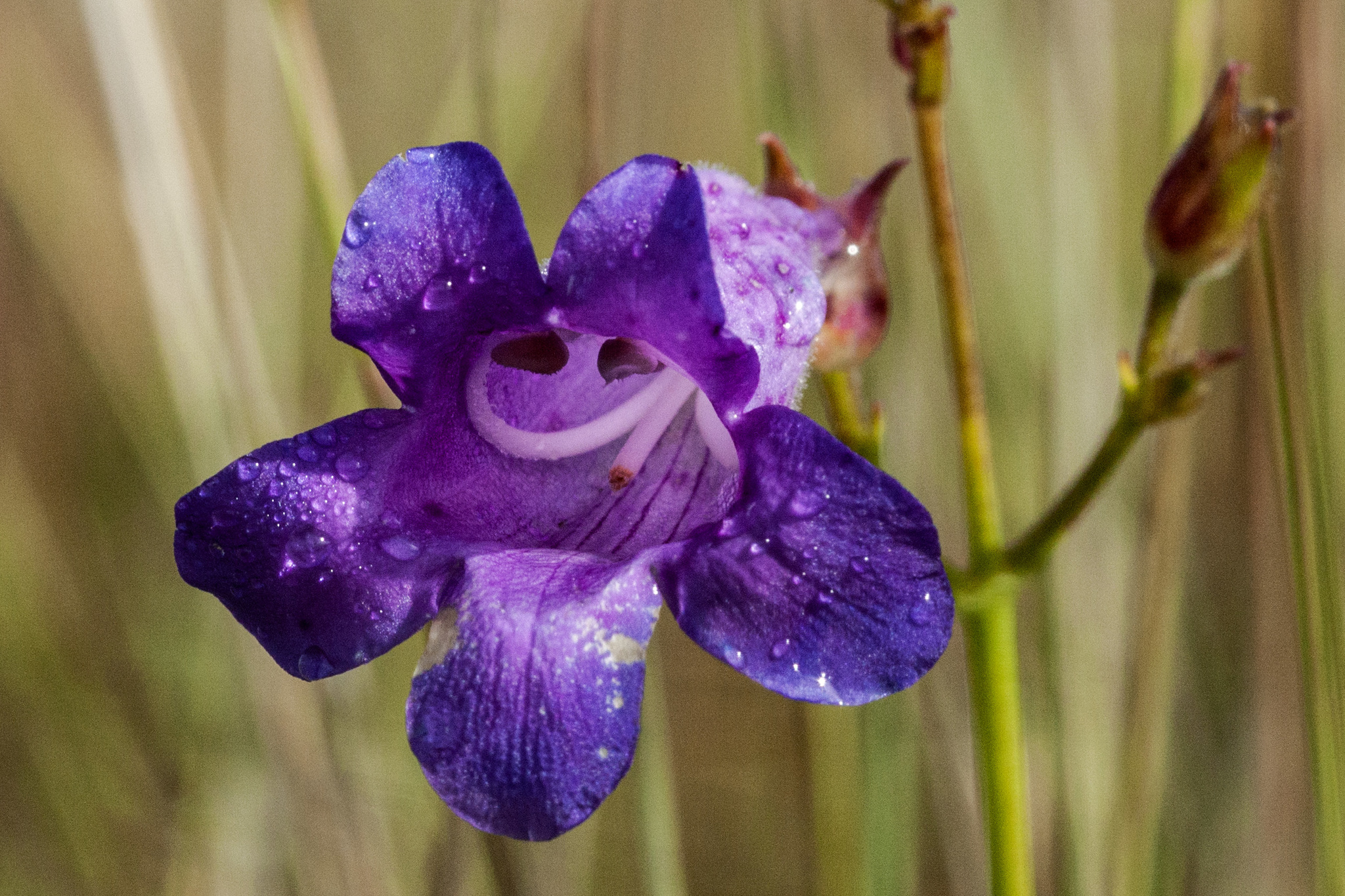
- Guerrero Municipality, Chihuahua, Mexico

Conservation status
- Apparently Secure (NatureServe)

Scientific classification
- Kingdom: Plantae
- Clade: Embryophytes
- Clade: Tracheophytes
- Clade: Angiosperms
- Clade: Eudicots
- Clade: Asterids
- Order: Lamiales
- Family: Plantaginaceae
- Genus: Penstemon
- Species: P. stenophyllus

Binomial name
- Penstemon stenophyllus A.Gray

Synonyms
- Penstemon rubescens

= Penstemon stenophyllus =

Plant species in the veronica family

Penstemon stenophyllus, commonly known as Sonoran penstemon or shoestring penstemon, is a species in the veronica family from Arizona and Mexico.

== Description ==
Shoestring penstemons are herbaceous perennial plants that grow one to three flowering stems 15 to 90 centimeters (6–35 in) tall. Though herbaceous, it has a woody caudex. The stems are often retrorsely hairy, covered in stiff backwards-pointing hairs, but can sometimes be nearly hairless.

The leaves are attached either to the stems or are basal leaves, attached directly to the caudex at the base of the plant, however the basal leaves are usually missing by the time a plant flowers. The lowest leaves on the stems and basal leaves are 1.6–8 cm long and just 3–10 millimeters wide, narrowly oblanceolate to lanceolate. The stems can have 12 to 60 leaves attached in pairs to opposite sides, but usually do not have more than 30. The upper leaves are narrow and grass-like, 4.5–15 cm long and just 1–6 mm wide. Like the stems they are often retrorsely hairy, but unlike the stems can sometimes be hairless.

The flowers are variously blue, lavender, purple or violet with darker reddish-purple floral guide lines pointing into the lower side of the flower's throat.

== Taxonomy ==
The species Penstemon stenophyllus was first scientifically described by Asa Gray in 1859. It is part of the Penstemon genus which is classified in the Plantaginaceae family. Asa Gray also described a species he named Penstemon rubescens in 1883 that is considered a heterotypic synonym.

=== Names ===
In Botanical Latin the species name, stenophyllus, means "narrow-leaved". It is known by the common names shoestring penstemon and Sonoran beardtongue or Sonoran penstemon.

== Range and habitat ==
Though it is native to both the United States and Mexico, most of its range is in Mexico. There it grows mostly in the Sierra Madre Occidental starting in Sonora and Chihuahua and then southwards to central Durango and also occurs in Zacatecas. According to Plants of the World Online it is also found as far south as Jalisco. In the United States it is only found in the Huachuca and Patagonia mountains of southeastern Arizona at elevations of 1,200–1,700 meters (3,900–5,600 ft). In Mexico the species can be found to as much as 2,300 m (7,500 ft).

The habitats where shoestring penstemons grow include desert grasslands and meadows in pine or pine–oak woodlands.

== Uses ==
Shoestring penstemons are not known to be in cultivation.

== See also ==
List of Penstemon species
