= George A. Dodd =

United States Army general (1852–1925)

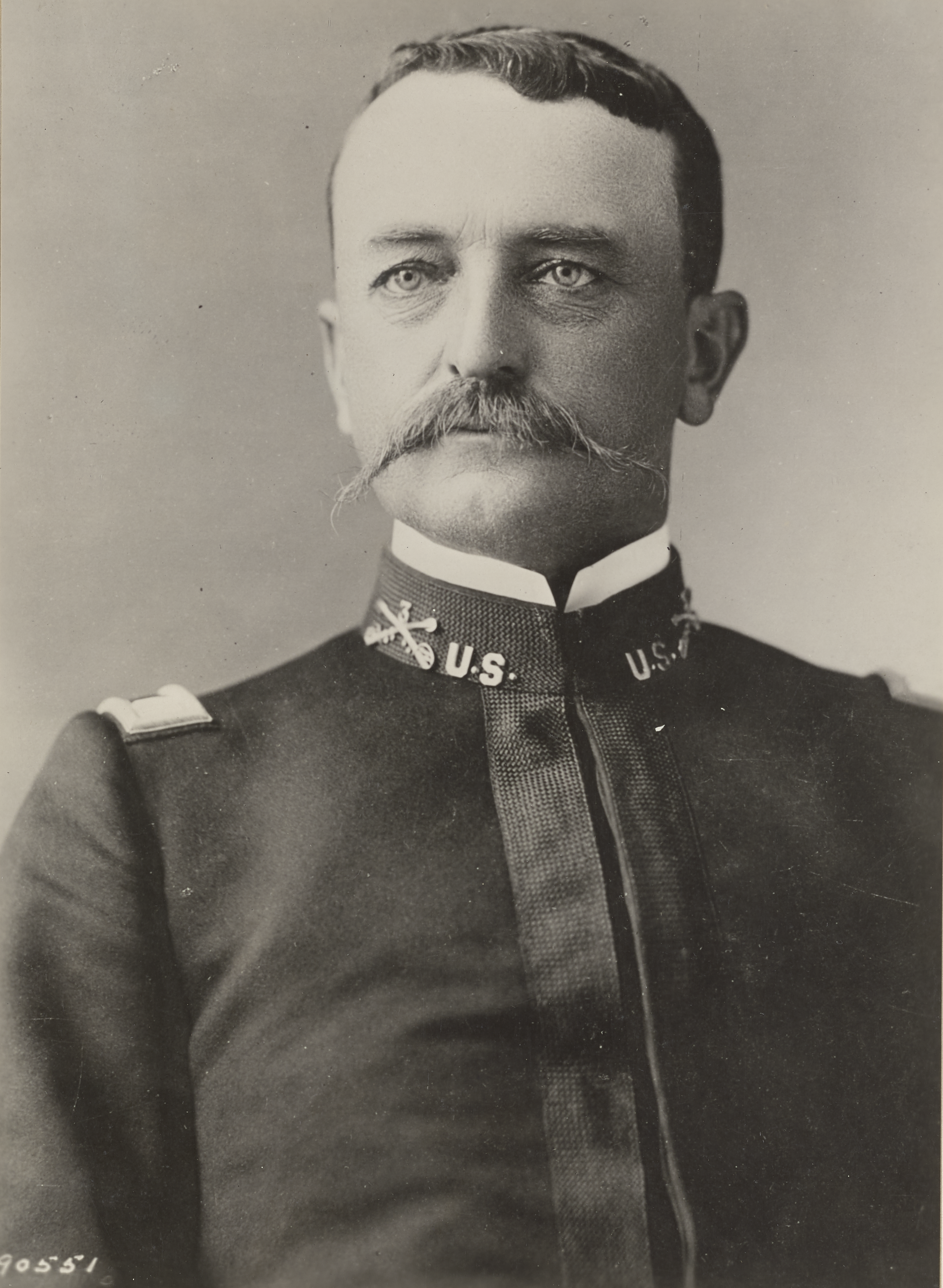
- Dodd as a major with the 3rd Cavalry, c. 1902
- Born: July 26, 1852; Lycoming County, Pennsylvania, US
- Died: June 28, 1925 (aged 72) Orlando, Florida, US
- Buried: Arlington National Cemetery
- Allegiance: United States
- Branch: US Army
- Service years: 1872–1916
- Rank: Brigadier General
- Conflicts: Great Sioux War: Battle of Bates Creek; Geronimo's War: Battle of Big Dry Wash; Spanish–American War: Battle of San Juan Hill; Siege of Santiago; Philippine–American War; Border War: Mexican Expedition; Battle of Guerrero
- Other work: Farmer

Brigadier General George Allan Dodd (July 26, 1852 – June 28, 1925) was an officer in the United States Army. He was known for his victory over the Villistas in 1916 at the Battle of Guerrero, Mexico, during the Pancho Villa Expedition.

== Early life and family ==
Dodd was born in Lycoming County, Pennsylvania, on July 26, 1852. Dodd's father was killed in the American Civil War in 1865, at the Siege of Petersburg, so he helped raise his younger brothers and sisters with his mother.

== Early career ==
In 1872, Dodd passed the entrance exam at West Point and was accepted into the United States Military Academy. He graduated on June 15, 1876. He joined the 3rd Cavalry and was sent to Dakota Territory to fight in the Great Sioux War against various native American tribes of the Northern Plains. During the war, Dodd led Sioux scouts and fought in the Battle of Bates Creek, in which the Cheyenne leader Dull Knife was killed.

In 1880, he married Clara Agnes Steele. They had nine children: Emily, Catherine, Allen, Charles, George Allen, Mary Ethel, William Alexander, Reginald Alden, and Lida Dorothy. Mary Ethel Dodd was the wife of Brigadier General Alfred A. Starbird and mother of Lieutenant General Alfred D. Starbird.

In 1882, in Geronimo's War, Dodd commanded Apache scouts in the American Southwest and northern Mexico. It was at this time that he fought in the Battle of Big Dry Wash on July 17, 1882, the last major battle involving the Apache.

== Spanish–American War ==
When the Spanish–American War began on April 25, 1898, Dodd was still serving in the 3rd Cavalry when he received orders to sail from Florida to Cuba with a large American invasion force in order to capture the island from its Spanish garrison. At the Battle of San Juan Hill on July 1, Dodd distinguished himself while fighting alongside Theodore Roosevelt and his Rough Riders. He was also wounded in the Siege of Santiago from July 3 through July 17 while serving as a captain. When the war ended, Dodd returned to the United States for a brief time and was promoted to major.

== Philippine insurrection ==
In 1899, the Filipino Rebellion began so that year the 3rd Cavalry sailed for Manila.

Dodd and the 3rd Cavalry remained on duty mainly in the Philippines until 1902, occasionally returning to America. In 1904 he was promoted to lieutenant colonel and placed second in command of the 10th Cavalry Buffalo Soldiers.

== Mexican punitive expedition ==
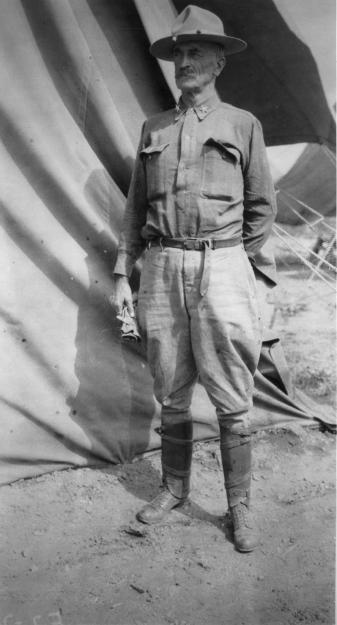
Dodd in 1916

In 1916, at age sixty-three, Dodd was the colonel of approximately 400 men of the 7th Cavalry, stationed at Camp Harry J. Jones, Arizona. Following Pancho Villa's attack on Columbus, New Mexico in March, Dodd and his command were ordered to ride south into Chihuahua, Mexico to participate in General John J. Pershing's punitive expedition. On March 29, Dodd arrived at the town of Guerrero, which was held by hundreds of Villistas, led by Villa himself. In what was called the "last true cavalry charge" in history, the 7th Cavalry attacked Guerrero and routed the Mexicans after five hours of fighting. Fifty-six of Villa's men, including one of his generals, were killed in the fighting, and another thirty-five were wounded. On the American side, only five men were wounded but the victory was not complete as Villa escaped capture with the majority of his men. However, over the next few months, the Villistas remained dispersed in the hills of the Sierra Madre and were no longer consider a threat to the United States Army.

News of the battle quickly spread to the United States, where Dodd was acclaimed a national hero. Soon thereafter, the Senate approved his promotion to brigadier general. Although Dodd was promoted on July 3, 1916, he retired from the Army just 23 days later on July 26, having reached the mandatory retirement age of 64.

== Personal life and family ==
In retirement, Dodd lived on his farm near Ithaca, New York. He later moved to a home in Orlando, Florida, where he died on June 28, 1925. General Dodd was buried with his wife and one son at Arlington National Cemetery.

Dodd's grandson Alfred Dodd Starbird was a penathlete in the 1936 Summer Olympics and lieutenant general in the Army. Great-great-granddaughter Kate Starbird was a professional basketball player before becoming a computer scientist.

== Awards ==
- Silver Star with three oak leaf clusters
- Indian Campaign Medal
- Spanish Campaign Medal
- Philippine Campaign Medal
- Mexican Service Medal
