= Luis T. Hernandez Terrazas =

Mexican engineer

Luis Trinidad Hernandez Terrazas (born c. 1906 in Chihuahua, Mexico; death date unknown) was a Mexican engineer who founded the brand LTH, one of the leading car battery brands in Mexico.

== Biography ==
Luis T. Hernandez Terrazas was born in Mesa de Cristo Rey, Chihuahua, Mexico in 1906, where he studied electricity by correspondence, initially working to improve the engine-starting crank system. He converted his mechanic shop into a place where he could work on his ideas, and there he invented a battery that maintained its charge for a long time. He noticed the method of cranking an engine was coming to an end, so he devised a black box as an accumulator to store energy. At age 20, he moved to Monterrey, Nuevo Leon, Mexico to bring his idea to the land of automotives, where he believed there would be numerous cars in the city.

He established the brand LTH in 1928, using his initials, as shown on the front of the battery, for Mexico, which was recovering from the revolution. To ensure his ideas were successful, he conducted multiple tests to prove his batteries were effective for the public, and he succeeded. He established his shop a few blocks from the Palacio de Gobierno in Monterrey at the corner of the streets Aramberri and Zaragoza.

Since then LTH has been one of the leading car battery brands in Mexico and Latin America. In 2004 it was acquired by Johnson Controls

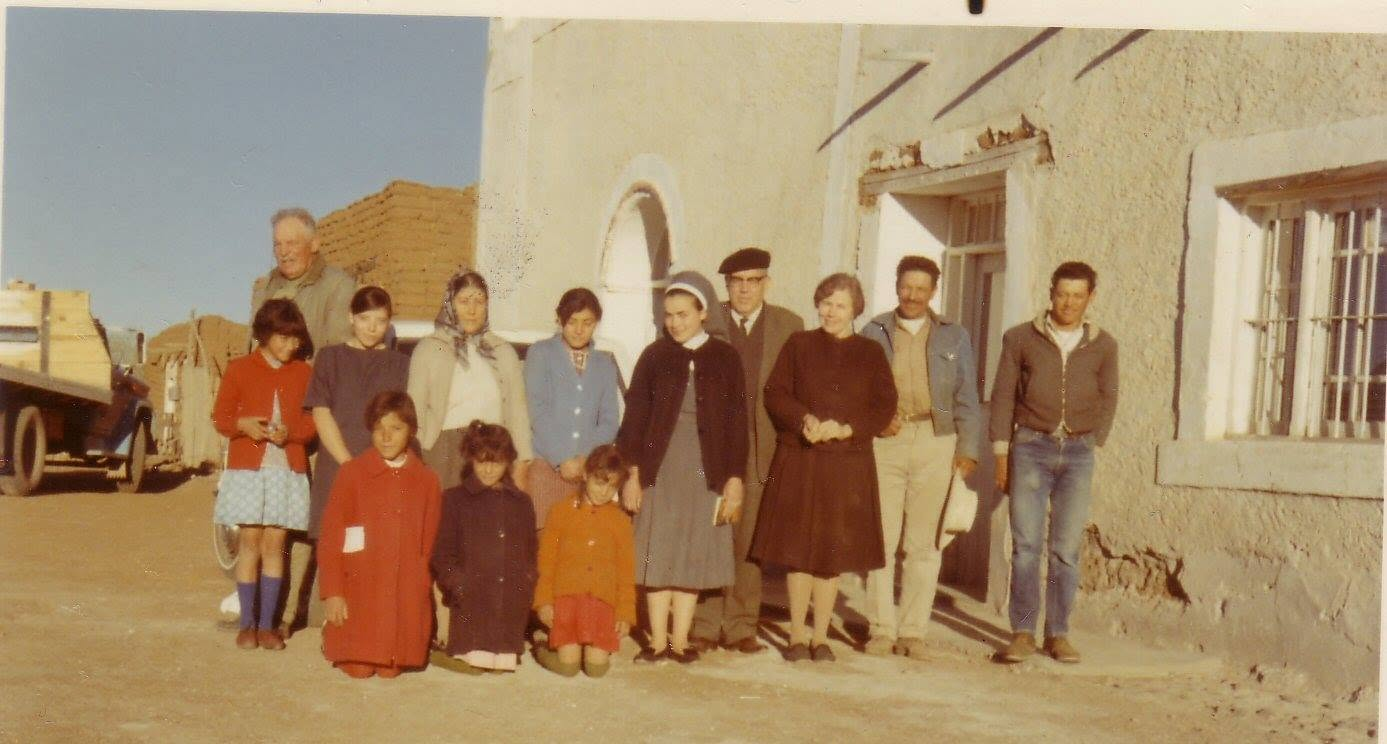
Luís T. Hernández, con boina, en la Mesa de Cristo Rey, Chihuahua
