= Hari K. Prasad =

Indian technologist

Hari Krishna Prasad Vemuru is an Indian security researcher. In April 2010, Prasad came to media attention, after an independent security analysis undertaken by Prasad, Rop Gonggrijp, Alex Halderman, and others found that the Electronic voting machines used by the Election Commission of India in India's elections could be manipulated by people who have physical access to the machines. In August 2010, Prasad was charged with suspected EVM theft and arrested. While government authorities stated that the voting machine tested by Prasad had been accessed illegally, Halderman stated that access to the machine had been obtained through a source who had legitimate access to it and that there was no evidence to indicate that it had been stolen. In October 2010, Prasad became the first Indian to be awarded the Pioneer Award by the Electronic Frontier Foundation.
