= The Woman with the Alabaster Jar =

Book by Margaret Starbird

- Author: Margaret Starbird
- Language: English
- Subject: Christianity
- Genre: Non-fiction
- Publisher: Inner Traditions/Bear
- Publication date: 1993

The Woman with the Alabaster Jar: Mary Magdalene and the Holy Grail is a book written by Margaret Starbird in 1993, claiming Jesus Christ and Mary Magdalene were married, and that Mary Magdalene was the Holy Grail.

Margaret Starbird developed the hypothesis that Saint Sarah was the daughter of Jesus and Mary Magdalene and that this was the source of the legend associated with the cult at Saintes-Maries-de-la-Mer. She stated (correctly) that the name "Sarah" means "Princess" in Hebrew, thus (supposedly) making her the forgotten child of the "sang réal", the blood royal of the King of the Jews.

The book is mentioned in the 2003 novel The Da Vinci Code, an international bestseller by Dan Brown; both books made use of the blood royal theory from the 1982 book The Holy Blood and the Holy Grail by Michael Baigent, Richard Leigh, and Henry Lincoln.

The book has been criticised for containing theories based on medieval lore and art, rather than on historical treatment of the Bible.

== See also ==
- Jesus bloodline
