= Disaster informatics =

This is the flag of the Federal Emergency Management Agency (FEMA). FEMA is used to coordinate federal responses to disasters by managing recovery and mitigation programs into preparedness for natural disasters.

Disaster informatics or crisis informatics is the study of the use of information and technology in the preparation, mitigation, response and recovery phases of disasters and other emergencies. Disaster informatics or emergency involves increased use of technology to depict how people can react to emergencies and other disasters that require fast improvements on recovery and preparedness. It began to emerge as a field after the successful use of a variety of technologies in disasters including the Asian tsunami, September 11th and Hurricane Katrina.

Disaster informatics may involve incorporating social media content generated by people in disaster zones into humanitarian response plans based on satellite imagery, early warning systems, and official emergency services procedures. Disaster informatics may involve crowdsourcing, data mining, participatory mapping or citizen science, with members of the public as 'everyday analysts'.

== History ==
The term Informatics goes back to the 1960s rooting to medical informatics, this defines informatics as a discipline of science that researches the structure and regularities of scientific information. Subsequently, Informatics became reiterated as the broad range of informatics topics and various definitions between 1960-2000. Essentially, this indicates that Informatics is the study of identifying information with the application of information and communication technologies to manage data and analyze humans in a social context.

Social informatics has grown tremendously over the past couple of decades, introduced as a stemming discipline to disaster informatics. In the late 1980's online systems became more networked and more portable for the emergence of innovation in information technology. As telecommunications grow globally, the spread of information and risks are very powerful resulting in disaster management. From the decade of 2000, informatics technologies have evolved and established disaster risk reduction technologies for advanced global disaster response.

The term Disaster informatics was first used in a request for proposal response by D. E. Yarrington after the WTC communications problems were revealed. Subsequently, in 2002, a grant proposal was submitted to the National Institutes of Health/National Library of Medicine to begin the formal study of disaster informatics as it related to public health. This initiative emerged from her library and information science work at Jackson State University.

== Crowdsourcing and data mining ==
Crowdsourcing is the practice of obtaining an overview of all information surrounding a specific situation. Crowdsourcing consists of reviewing information and data by analyzing online communities and this can be done through analyzing social media platforms and other online networks. Crowdsourcing is a type of data analysis method used in correspondence with creating response mechanisms and mitigation exercises to build situation recovery and preparedness to react to emergencies efficiently and promptly. With the constant spread of information, social media platforms are a main source of how crowdsourcing becomes useful. As crowdsourcing is gathering information, disaster informatics uses data mediation to create a strong data collection base.

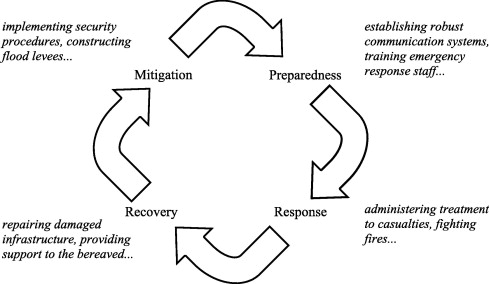
This figure represents the phases and different mechanisms used to provide a structure in disaster management.

In the context of disaster informatics, crowdsourcing helps to balance information and then use information technologies to prepare for certain situations. Disaster informatics uses crowdsourcing to maintain a plan for response and recovery over time in different crises and natural disasters. Crowdsourcing is used in a variety of ways by disaster informatics, for example in disaster-affected locations crowdsourcing can review social media platforms to examine disasters in real time and help get assistance where it is needed. Crowdsourcing also uses information technologies and telecommunication technologies to communicate precautions during times of crisis and uses early warning systems to reduce risks in the spread of misinformation. Crowdsourcing most corresponds with disaster informatics by advancing improvement in situational awareness and implementing reliability, responsive crisis organizations, and humanitarian collaborations like satellite imagery, early warning systems, and data mining.

Data mining is the process of obtaining valuable information to determine the different patterns within large pieces of data. Data mining methods are a crucial step toward self-organization and computer-mediated communication to foster more effective disaster management.

In disaster informatics, data mining uses information to mediate the spread of misinformation by retrieving data from satellite imagery and early warning systems to predict weather conditions, natural disasters, and potential threats. Data mining helps to improve decision-making throughout disasters by finding challenges in data and using them to reduce risks in predictions for disaster response. Essentially, data mining provides insight into computing innovation in public forums and continuously communicates responsive predictions of disaster recovery.

== Data methods and analysis ==
Disaster informatics focuses on the retrieval of data and analyzing this data to extract significant information to form safety precautions and recovery mechanisms in preparation for situational disasters. Different data methods like crowdsourcing, remote sensing, data mining, computer vision, participatory mapping, and citizen-generated science are practiced to provide insights among specific complex data to gauge decision-making and prioritize effective resources. When using these tools and technologies in disaster informatics the data collected involves using real-time event detection, using sensory networks to find data mapping information, and using the statistics of past disasters to allocate resources and rapid quality assessment.

Within the process of reforming and extracting data from large-scale data analytics like social media, satellite imagery, remote sensing, and multidisciplinary layers of data the analysis of this type of data introduces different developments of health effectiveness in response to opening a comprehensive approach to disaster management and disaster informatics. These methods enhance the options used to distribute communications and interactions during, after, and before disasters occur.

== Technologies ==
In disaster informatics, there are a number of technologies that are used to collect and disseminate data for disaster preparedness and mitigation. These technologies are used to make visual differences within communities to provide awareness to disaster-affected communities. Through 1900s-2000s the International Decade for Natural Disaster Reduction initiative arose and started by using technologies like geographic information systems (GIS), data visualization tools for real-time monitoring, different simulation models, and cloud computing to evaluate the behavior of the population to understand how people should and can respond to disasters. This helped people to use resources and responsive strategies to evaluate a disaster and evacuate if required. These complex measures explain clear analysis for the higher-risk areas in the location of a natural disaster and even lower-risk areas for prompt reaction and preparedness.

In the context of individual association with disaster informatics, Geographic Information Systems are used for hazard mapping and damage assessment to help visualize routes to take in infrastructure to the disaster-impacted areas. GIS includes technologies like satellite imagery, social media, and other remote sensory networks. Remote sensing is very compatible with disaster informatics by detecting satellite or drone-type technologies by using these sensing technologies to evaluate images to provide information about geographical changes in weather patterns, land change, and damage levels after a disaster. Combining this with early warning systems and evaluating population behaviors in natural and man-made crises have helped create alerts to the authorities and the public promptly. These tools and visualization technologies reflect data, maps, and graphs in a way that allows people to make distinctions regarding disaster recovery.

== Real-life scenarios ==
In correspondence with the history and known definition of information technology and informatics, the use of “smart” technologies grew tremendously as the year 2000 hit and catastrophic events substantially shaped the way that disaster informatics is now used for disaster management. Subsequently, some of the major catastrophic events that took place after the International Decade for Natural Disaster Reduction (IDNDR) initiative were the attacks of September 11, Hurricane Katrina, and the Asian tsunami. Each of these disasters called for an initiative that protects and proposes management and recovery in coordination with disaster informatics. In response to these disasters, Informatics resulted in an emergence of information, data collection, communicational response, and fast-acting solutions to any public crisis.

The attacks of September 11 played a vital role in the disbursement of disaster management as these attacks not only signified the importance of disaster informatics, but embraced the need for rapid response mechanisms to perform emergence governance to the public. In 2001, the United Nations International Strategy for Disaster Reduction called for actions regarding disaster informatics and the study and role of science and technology in disaster reduction. After these attacks occurred this opened up a large volume of communication and coordination between several government agencies to cover different categories of disaster recovery. Through communication systems and geospatial technologies this then emerged effective solutions for more catastrophic emergencies. These solutions consist of the Federal Emergency Management Agency and Homeland Security Information Network, working toward helping mainstream agencies improve recovery and preparedness for future crises.

In 2004, The Asian tsunami exposed a whole new territory of recovery and preparedness regarding geographic natural disaster. During this time, with no early warning systems in place, the tsunami made it difficult for responders to act fast and predict moves for future precaution. Using disaster informatics, this led to the creation of data regarding oceanic measurement and tectonic wave activity to determine the areas affected by post-tsunami damages. Disaster informatics took over the response to mitigate tsunami and earthquake research and used technologies like remote sensing and crowdsourcing to develop automated responses to detect tsunamis in preparations for emergency evacuation.

By 2005, disaster informatics had made modifications to emergency communication systems and response planning within several areas of disaster management. After Hurricane Katrina, disaster informatics became more significant and more evolved with improved technological solutions for rescue resources and emergency planning. With the research limitations, Hurricane Katrina exposed many weaknesses within the usefulness of GIS and crowdsourcing, due to the lack of preparation and tools and resources for evacuation.

Essentially, all of these catastrophic events took place in a manner that structured disaster informatics, to better improve technology and mechanisms to ensure utmost safety regarding future events. Overall, disaster informatics will continue to evolve and involve new technologies for better data preparation and help coordinate awareness for communication technologies in disaster management.

== See also ==
- Information Systems for Crisis Response and Management
- International Decade for Natural Disaster Reduction
- United Nations International Strategy for Disaster Reduction
- Disaster Management
- Emergency management
- Disaster response
