= Basúchil =

Basúchil Villa de Aguilar
- Town
- Location in Mexico Basúchil (Mexico)
- Coordinates: 28°31′N 107°24′W
- Country: Mexico
- State: Chihuahua
- Municipality: Guerrero
- Elevation: 2,152 m (7,060 ft)

Population (2010)
  - Total: 1,451
- Time zone: UTC-6 (Central)
- Postcode: 31687
- Area code: 635
- Climate: BSk

Basúchil (Bajichi), "water well" in the Raramuri language, is a town in the municipality of Guerrero, State of Chihuahua, Mexico. It was founded in 1649 as a presidio to protect the Jesuit mission in the Tarahumara Papigochi region a few miles to the west. Basúchil was initially named La Villa de Aguilar by its founder, Diego Guajardo Fajardo, governor of the New Vizcaya, after his home town, Aguilar de la Frontera, Spain. In 1652 the town was destroyed and its inhabitants killed by an attack incited by the Tarahumara leader Teporaca. Years later it was resettled and renamed Basúchil. The Adolfo Lopez Mateos-Madera Highway (Route 16) passes on the east side.

Abraham González, later governor of Chihuahua, was born in Basúchil in 1864. Ángel González, the ranchera composer best known for his seminal narcocorrido, "Contrabando y Traición," lived most of his life in Basúchil.

== Economy ==
In the 20th century, Mennonites from the area around Cuauhtémoc, Chihuahua, introduced apple trees; as a result, apples became one of the region's main industries, along with beef cattle. Corn, beans, and potatoes are also cultivated throughout the region.
