= Alfred A. Starbird =

United States Army general (1875–1956)

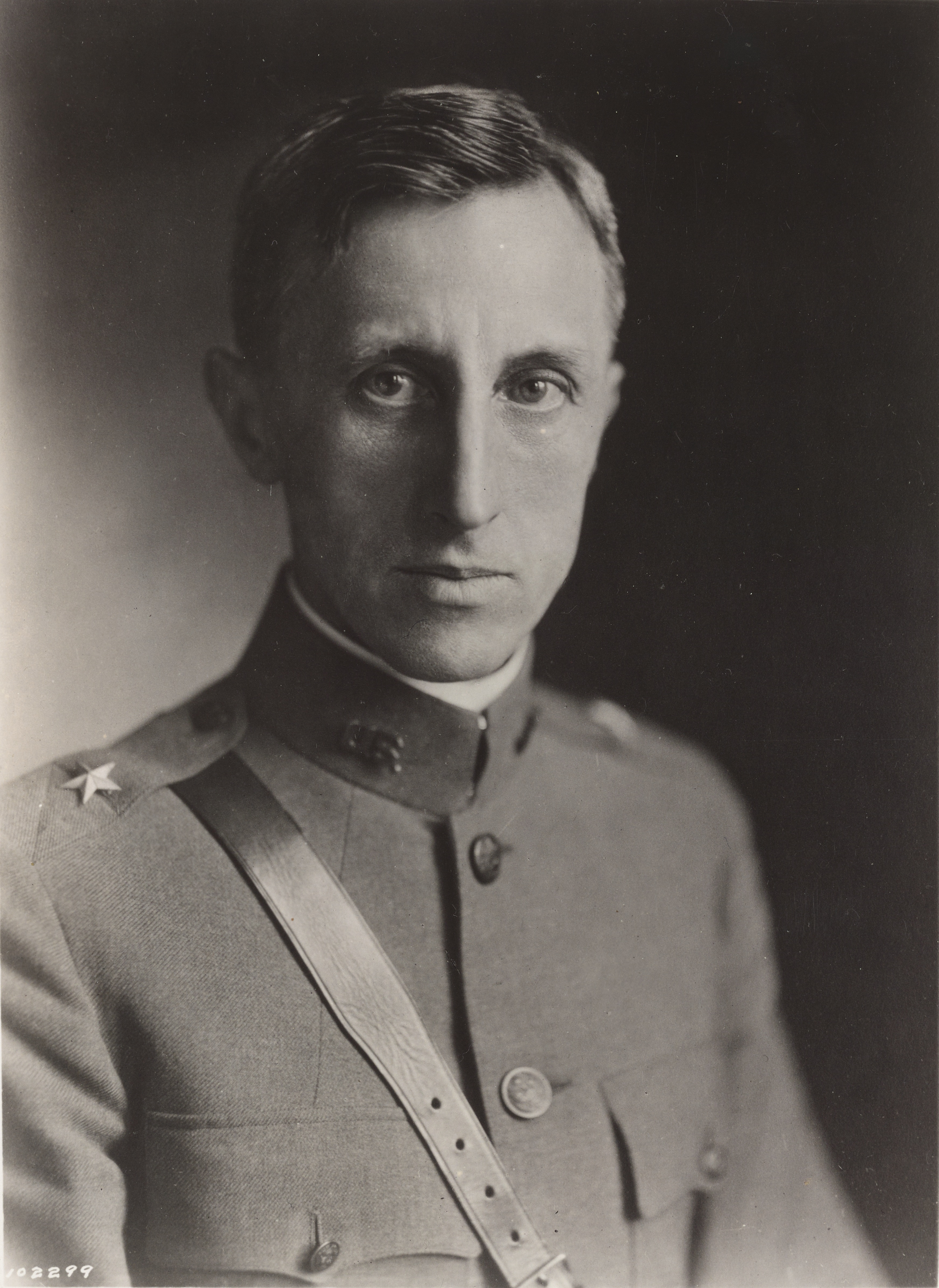
- Starbird in 1922
- Born: 15 July 1875; Paris, Maine, US
- Died: 9 December 1956 (aged 81); Kensington, Maryland, US
- Burial place: Arlington National Cemetery
- Education: University of Maine; United States Army Command and General Staff College; United States Army War College
- Spouse: Mary Ethel Dodd (m. 1911–1956)
- Children: 3 (including Alfred D. Starbird)
- Relatives: George A. Dodd (father-in-law)
- Military career
- Service: United States Army
- Service years: 1898–1930
- Rank: Brigadier General
- Service number: 0–662
- Units: US Army Field Artillery Branch; US Army Coast Artillery Corps
- Commands: Battery C, 5th Field Artillery Regiment; 8th Field Artillery Brigade; Base Section No. 5, Brest, France; 6th Field Artillery Regiment; 1st Field Artillery Brigade; 7th Field Artillery Regiment
- Wars: Spanish–American War; Philippine–American War; Mexican Border War; World War I Occupation of the Rhineland
- Awards: Army Distinguished Service Medal
- Other work: Historian; Genealogist

Alfred A. Starbird (15 July 1875 – 9 December 1956) was a career officer in the United States Army. A veteran of the Spanish–American War, Philippine–American War, Mexican Border War, World War I, and Occupation of the Rhineland, he served from 1898 to 1930. Starbird attained the rank of brigadier general and was a recipient of the Army Distinguished Service Medal. After retiring, he was a historian and genealogist.

Starbird was raised and educated in Paris, Maine and was an 1898 graduate of the University of Maine. He enlisted in the army for the Spanish–American War in May 1898, and in August he received his commission as a second lieutenant of Field Artillery. He served in Manila during the Philippine–American War, and carried out Field Artillery and Coast Artillery assignments throughout the United States. As he advanced through the ranks, he also served in inspector general postings. During World War I, he commanded an artillery brigade and the US port at Brest, France.

After the First World War, Starbird graduated from the United States Army War College and served in senior command and staff assignments including command of the 6th Field Artillery Regiment, 1st Field Artillery Brigade, and 7th Field Artillery Regiment. In retirement, Starbird resided in Vermont, and later moved to Kensington, Maryland. He died in Kensington on 9 December 1956 and was buried at Arlington National Cemetery.

== Early life ==
Alfred Andrews Starbird was born in Paris, Maine on 15 July 1875, a son of Emeline Hardy (Roberts) Hardy and Winfield Scott Starbird, a Union Army veteran of the American Civil War. He was raised and educated in Paris and attended Paris Hill Academy. He then attended Maine State College (now the University of Maine), from which he graduated in 1898 with a Bachelor of Science degree in pharmacy. While in college, he joined the Phi Kappa Sigma fraternity. In 1897, he won the school's annual Walter Balentine Prize, which was awarded to the member of the junior class who excelled in biological chemistry. Starbird was also a member of the school's Coburn Cadets, in which he was commissioned a second lieutenant. Among Starbird's college classmates was Dana T. Merrill, a career army officer who attained the rank of brigadier general.

=== Family ===
In 1911, Starbird married Mary Ethel Dodd, the daughter of George A. Dodd, a brigadier general in the army. They were married until his death and were the parents of three children. Son Alfred D. Starbird was a career army officer and attained the rank of lieutenant general. Daughter Catherine was a writer and the wife of engineer Nahum Edward Jennison of Shelburne, Vermont. Daughter Ethel was an army veteran of World War II, journalist, and federal government public relations official.

== Start of career ==
In May 1898, Starbird enlisted for the Spanish–American War and was appointed a sergeant in Company D, 1st Maine Volunteer Infantry, which underwent training at Camp Chickamauga, Georgia. In August, he received his commission as a second lieutenant in Battery B, 6th Field Artillery Regiment. After initial duty at Fort McHenry, Maryland, Starbird served with his regiment in Manila during the Philippine–American War. In April 1901, he was promoted to first lieutenant and assigned to the 70th Coast Artillery Company while continuing to serve in Manila. He returned to the United States in late 1901 and was stationed at Fort Monroe, Virginia, where he attended the course of instruction for artillery officers. After graduating in July 1902, he was attached to the 45th Coast Artillery Company at Fort Monroe for temporary duty. In September 1902 he was posted to Coast Artillery duty at Fort Dupont, Delaware.

In December 1902, Starbird was assigned to the 83rd Coast Artillery Company at Fort Revere, Massachusetts. In September 1903, he was assigned to the 13th Coast Artillery Company at Fort Monroe. In July 1904, Starbird was transferred to the 31st Coast Artillery Company at Fort Caswell, North Carolina. In October 1905, he was assigned to Coast Artillery duty at Fort Slocum, New York. In June 1907, Starbird was assigned to the staff of the 5th Field Artillery Regiment while continuing to serve at Fort Slocum. In January 1908, he assumed command of the regiment's Battery C at Fort Leavenworth, Kansas. In February 1912, Starbird was assigned to the US Army Field Artillery School at Fort Sill, Oklahoma, where he was a student in the School of Fire's course for officers.

== Continued career ==
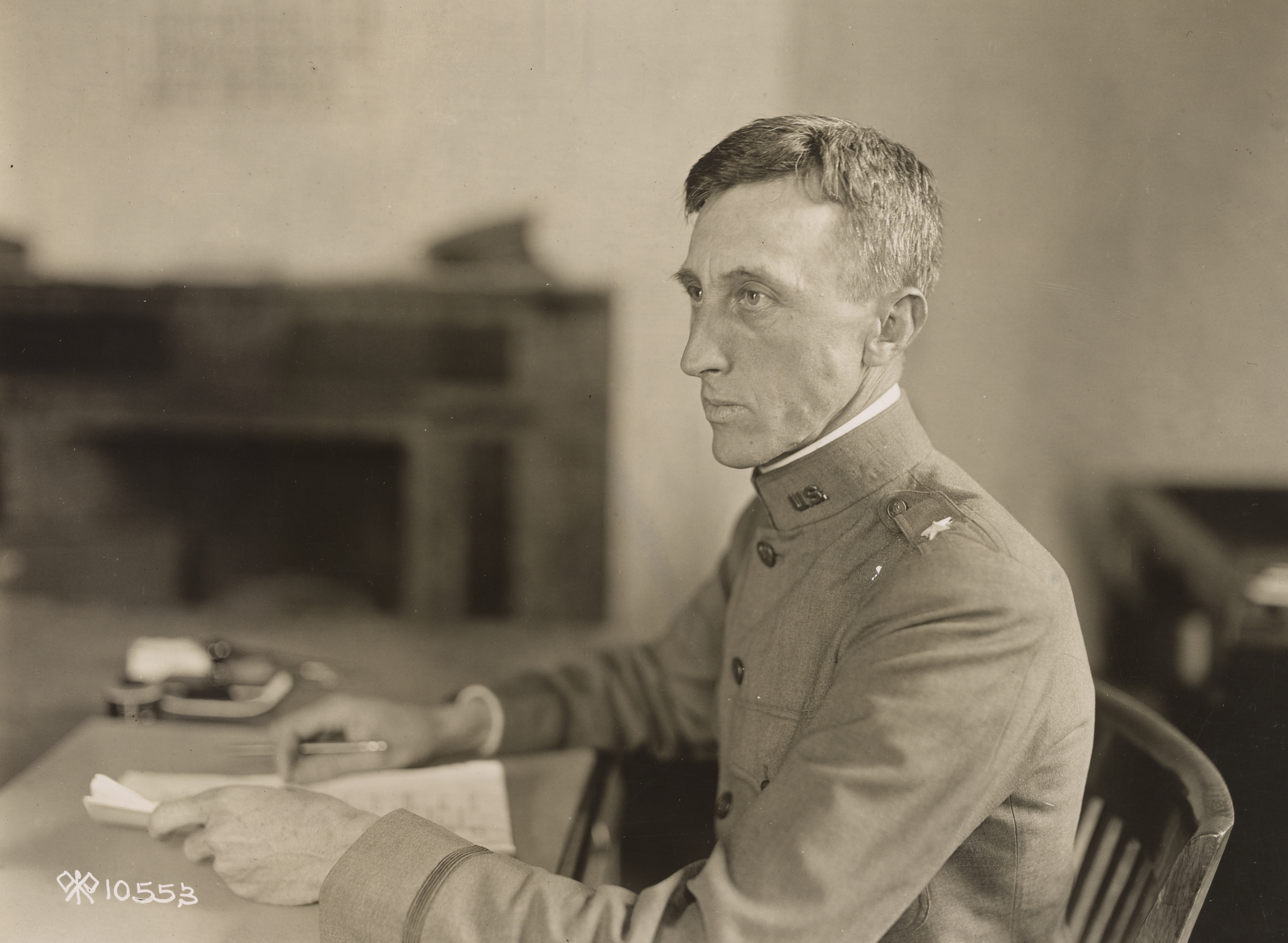
Starbird in 1918

In May 1912, Starbird began the course at Fort Leavenworth's School of the Line. After graduating in May 1913, he was assigned as a student at Fort Leavenworth's United States Army Command and General Staff College. In August 1913, he was among the army officers assigned as instructors and observers for the National Guard training camp that was held near Fremont, Nebraska. After graduating from the staff college, he continued to serve with the 5th Field Artillery at Fort Sill. In July 1916, Starbird was promoted to major and assigned to lead a contingent of soldiers that studied and devised ways to employ tractors the army purchased for use in towing artillery pieces during the Mexican Border War. After his duty with the towed artillery detachment, he was assigned to Fort Bliss, Texas as an instructor for units of the National Guard as they were activated for federal service on the Mexico-U.S. border.

With American entry into World War I looming, in February 1917 Starbird was detailed to the Office of the Inspector General of the United States Army and assigned to inspector general's duty with the army's Southern Department. The US entered the war on 6 April 1917, and on 10 April Starbird was assigned to inspector general's duty at the Northeastern Department's Boston headquarters. In August 1917, Starbird received promotion to lieutenant colonel, after which he was assigned to duty at the inspector general's headquarters in Washington, DC. Starbird received promotion to temporary colonel in November 1917. During the war, Starbird inspected field artillery units during organization and training to ensure they were prepared to depart for combat in France. In April 1918, he was promoted to temporary brigadier general. In May 1918, Starbird was assigned to command the 8th Field Artillery Brigade at Camp Fremont, California. In September 1918, he relocated with his brigade from Camp Fremont to Fort Sill, where it underwent additional training. Starbird arrived in France shortly before the Armistice of November 11, 1918 ended the war, and he commanded Base Section No. 5, the US port of embarkation in Brest.

== Later career ==
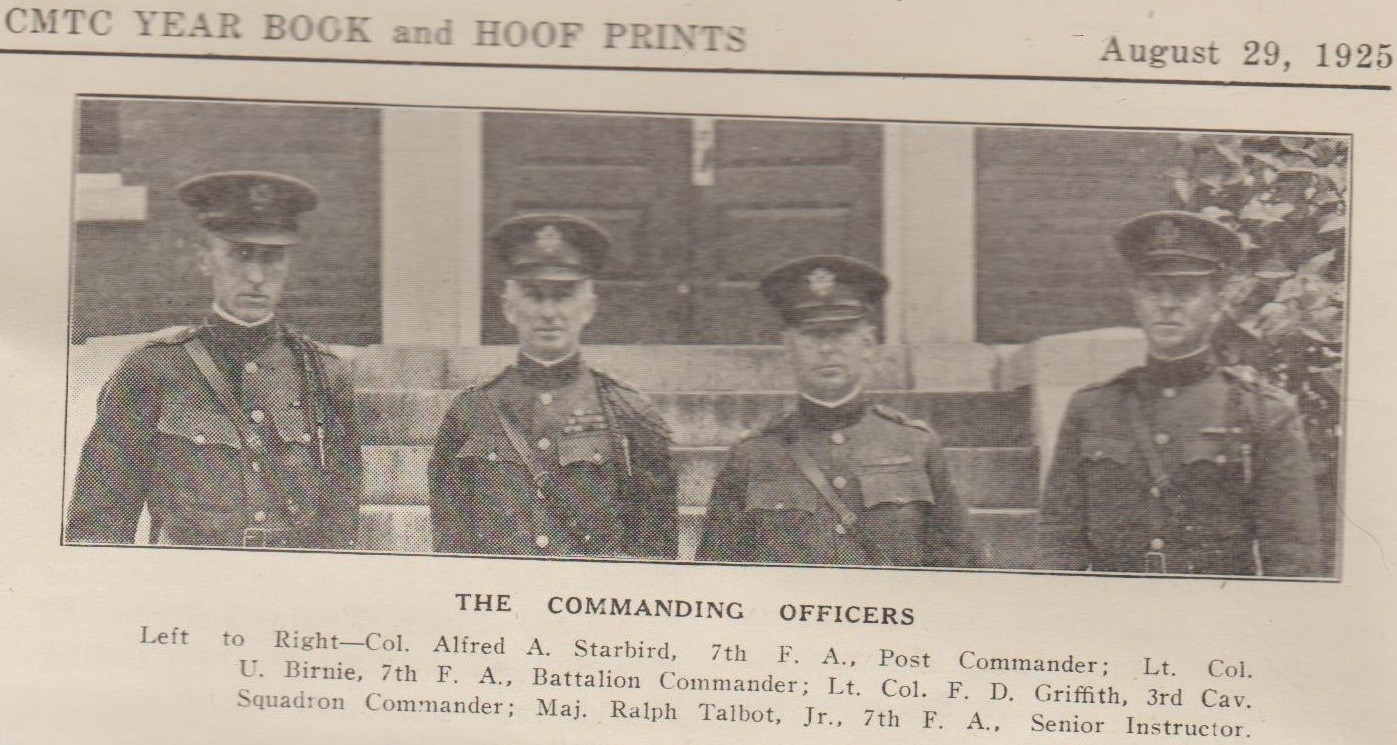
Ft. Ethan Allen in 1925, L to R: Starbird, Upton Birnie Jr., Frederick D. Griffith Jr., Ralph Talbot Jr.

After the First World War, Starbird remained in Europe and continued in command of the port of Brest during the post-war Occupation of the Rhineland. He returned to the United States in May 1919 and was reduced in rank to lieutenant colonel in June. In July 1919, he was posted to Washington, DC and assigned as a student at the United States Army War College. He was promoted to colonel in July 1920 and assigned to the War Department General Staff. From October 1923 to January 1925, Starbird commanded the 6th Field Artillery Regiment at Fort Hoyle, Maryland. He commanded the 1st Field Artillery Brigade in Boston from December 1924 to March 1925, and the 7th Field Artillery Regiment at Fort Ethan Allen, Vermont from January 1925 to June 1926. After commanding the 7th Field Artillery, Starbird was assigned to duty as assistant chief of staff for operations (G-3) on the staff of the Second Corps Area at Governors Island, New York. Starbird requested retirement in 1929, which was approved in February 1930.

In retirement, Starbird was a resident of Burlington, Vermont. In June 1930, the US Congress enacted legislation permitting the general officers of World War I to retire at their highest rank, and Starbird was promoted to brigadier general on the retired list. In 1932, Starbird was active in organizations that opposed the Bonus Army's efforts to obtain early payment during the Great Depression of benefits due to First World War veterans. Starbird was a Freemason and attained the 32nd degree of the Scottish Rite. He was also a historian and genealogist and a fellow of the Institute of American Genealogy, and his published works included a genealogy of the Starbird family. In addition, Starbird was a member of legacy societies including the Sons of the American Revolution. In his later years, Starbird resided first in Jericho, Vermont, then at a nursing home in Kensington, Maryland. He died in Kensington on 9 December 1956 and was buried at Arlington National Cemetery.

=== Awards ===
Starbird received the Army Distinguished Service Medal for his World War I service and post-war occupation duty. The citation read:

For services in connection with the planning, organization, and administration of the post and subposts of Brest, Base Section No. 5, thereby contributing in a very great measure to the successful operation of this base during the return of the American Expeditionary Forces.

Service: United States Army Organization: American Expeditionary Forces Date: 3 May 1922 Orders: War Department, General Order No. 19

== Dates of rank ==
Starbird's dates of rank were:

- Sergeant (United States Volunteers), 13 May 1898
- Second Lieutenant, 9 July 1898
- First Lieutenant, 2 February 1901
- Captain, 31 July 1903
- Major, 1 July 1916
- Lieutenant Colonel, 15 May 1917
- Colonel (Army of the United States), 1 July 1920
- Brigadier General (Army of the United States), 12 April 1918
- Lieutenant Colonel, 1 June 1919
- Colonel, 1 July 1920
- Brigadier General (Retired), 1 February 1930

== Works by ==
- Genealogy of the Starbird-Starbard-Family. Burlington, Vermont: The Lane Press. 1943 – via Internet Archive.
