= Secretary of Defense Meritorious Civilian Service Award =

U.S. Department of Defense award

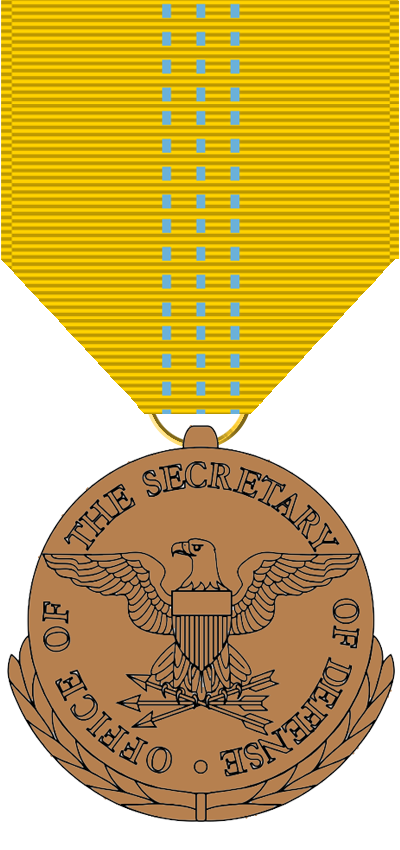
- Ribbon of the medal
- Type: Career award
- Awarded for: Exceptionally noteworthy or superlative contributions of major significance to the Department of Defense.
- Country: United States
- Presented by: United States Department of Defense
- Eligibility: Career civilian employees of the federal government
- Ribbon

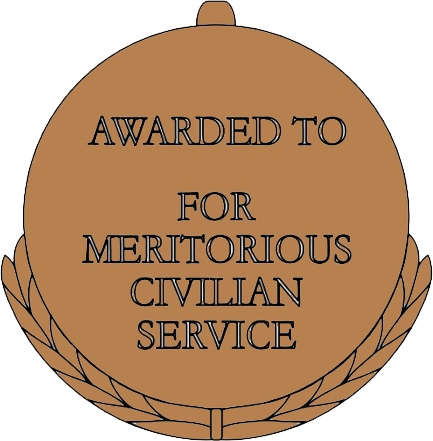
- Reverse

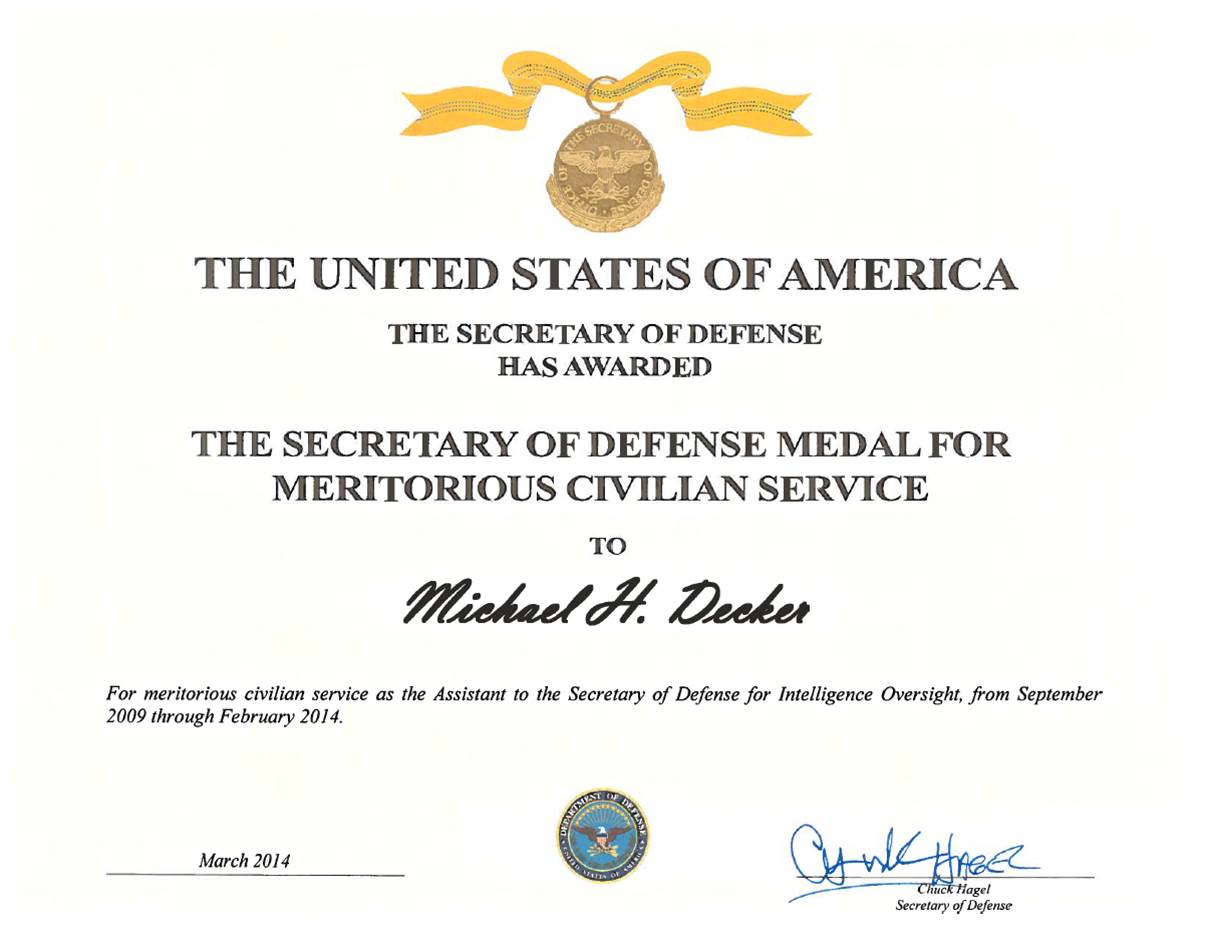
- Example of Secretary of Defense Medal for Meritorious Civilian Service

Precedence
- Next (higher): Department of Defense Distinguished Civilian Service Award

The Secretary of Defense Meritorious Civilian Service Award is the second highest career award presented by the Department of Defense. It is presented for exceptionally noteworthy service of major significance to the Department of Defense as a whole.

== Award procedure ==
Candidates for this award are Department of Defense or other government agency employees who have rendered exceptionally meritorious service of major significance to the Department of Defense. This award requires review by the Department of Defense Incentive Awards Board. This board recommends approval or disapproval of the award, though the Secretary of Defense is the approval authority. Heads of the Office of the Secretary of Defense Components and Secretaries of Military Departments submit nominations to the Assistant Director for Labor and Management Employee Relations, Directorate for Personnel and Security, Washington Headquarters Services.

== Award device ==
Recipients of the award receive a medal set, a certificate signed by the Secretary of Defense and citation. Recipients may receive the award more than once, with subsequent awards being recognized by bronze, silver, or gold palms.

== See also ==
- Awards and decorations of the United States government
