= Vicente Guerrero, Chihuahua =

Town in the Mexican state of Chihuahua

Vicente Guerrero
- City
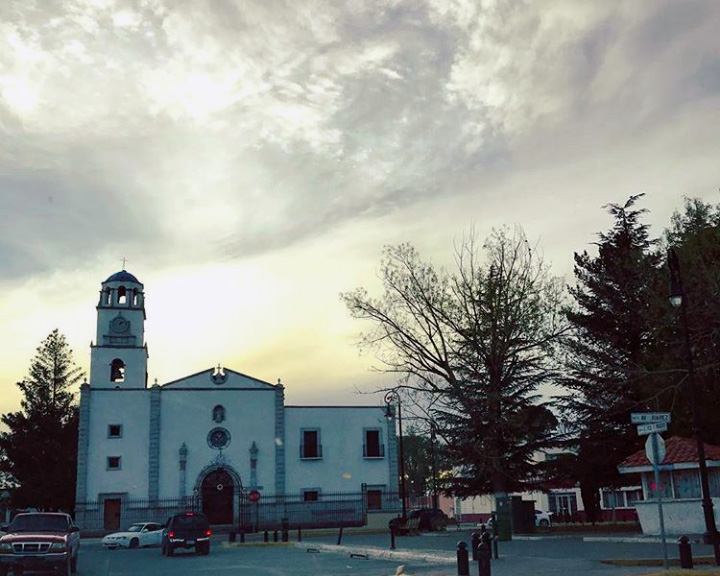

- Location in Mexico
- Coordinates: 28°32′52″N 107°29′08″W
- Country: Mexico
- State: Chihuahua
- Municipality: Guerrero

Population (2010)
  - Total: 7,751

Vicente Guerrero is a town and seat of the municipality of Guerrero, in the northern Mexican state of Chihuahua. As of 2010, the town had a population of 7,751, up from 6,536 as of 2005.

It was the location of the March 1916 Battle of Guerrero.
