= MediaJustice =

American national non-profit organization

MediaJustice is an American national non-profit organization based in Oakland, California, established in 2008. Until 2019, MediaJustice was known as the Center for Media Justice. It was founded by Malkia Cyril and its current executive director is Steven Renderos. The organization's mission is "to build a powerful movement for a more just and participatory media and digital world—with racial equity and human rights for all".

== Background ==
In 2002, leaders from We Interrupt This Message and Race Forward (formerly the Applied Research Center) launched the Youth Media Council (YMC) to counter media bias against California's youth and people of color. As the project grew, it expanded to address inequities in media access and coverage in diverse communities by collaborating with local social justice groups nationwide. With technical support from the Movement Strategy Center, YMC staff organized these groups into the Media Action Grassroots Network (MAG-Net), and evolved to become the Center for Media Justice (CMJ). Launched in 2008, CMJ is now a nationally recognized organizing hub representing the media policy interests and building the cultural leadership of hundreds of social justice groups across the United States.

Vision
MediaJustice has a vision that states, "MediaJustice is a long-term vision to democratize the economy, government, and society through policies and practices that ensure: democratic media ownership, fundamental communication rights; universal media and technology access, and meaningful, accurate representation within news and popular culture for everyone."

MediaJustice believes that media justice will be achieved when the media and cultural environment result in connected communities, fair economies, racial justice and human rights for all people, and lift up the voices of communities of color, low-income people and other under-represented communities.

== See also ==
- Media activism
