= Margaret Starbird =

American writer

- Born: Margaret Leonard; June 18, 1942 (age 84); West Point, New York, U.S.
- Education: University of Maryland, College Park (BS, MS)
- Occupation: Author
- Notable work: The Woman with the Alabaster Jar
- Spouse: Edward Starbird (m. 1968)
- Children: 5, including Kate
- Father: Charles Leonard

Margaret Leonard Starbird (born June 18, 1942) is the author of seven books arguing for the existence of a secret Christian tradition that held Jesus was married to Mary Magdalene, calling it the "Grail heresy", after having set out to discredit the bloodline hypothesis contained in The Holy Blood and the Holy Grail.

== Career ==
Starbird holds Bachelor of Arts (1963) and Master of Arts (1966) degrees from the University of Maryland, College Park, where she majored in medieval studies, comparative literature and German language. During her graduate studies, Starbird taught German courses at the University of Maryland. Then from 1969 to 1970, Starbird taught foreign language courses at North Carolina State University.

From 1988 to 1989, Starbird took classes at Vanderbilt Divinity School, later teaching religious education and Scripture in Catholic parishes. Starbird was a basic skills instructor at Central Texas College's extension program at the Fort Lewis military base in Tacoma, Washington from 1992 to 2004.

== Works and beliefs ==
In her 1993 book The Woman with the Alabaster Jar: Mary Magdalen and the Holy Grail, Margaret Starbird developed the hypothesis that Saint Sarah was the daughter of Jesus and Mary Magdalen and that this was the source of the legend associated with the cult at Saintes-Maries-de-la-Mer, France. She also claimed that the name "Sarah" meant "Princess" in Hebrew, thus making her the forgotten child of the "sang réal", the blood royal of the King of the Jews. Her works contain many references to ancient alphanumeric codes known as Hebrew Gematria and Greek Isopsephy. She also exposes secrets encoded in classical art. Starbird believes that the patriarchal Roman Catholic church suppressed the veneration and devotion of the sacred feminine, leading to an unbalanced spirituality in mainstream Christianity.

Margaret Starbird has outlined her conviction that "Christianity at its inception included the celebration of the Hieros gamos ("holy wedding") of opposites, a model incarnate in the archetypal bridegroom and his bride – Jesus the Christ and the woman called "the Magdalen". This model of unity, tragically lost in the cradle of Christianity, is patterned on the fundamental blueprint for life on our planet, and manifested in the leadership role played by certain women in the community of Jesus' first followers." Starbird claims this sacred partnership was the same as that which existed in other regions of the Near East that predated Christianity, comparable to the cults of Inanna and Dummuzi, Ishtar and Tammuz – being part of a fertility cult that brought well being to its people. This marriage honored "the cosmic dance of masculine and feminine energies and the eternal cycles manifested by the Life Force", with Mary Magdalene designated the "Queen of Heaven".

Starbird does not believe that Mary Magdalen originated from the town of Magdala, saying it was originally named Taricheae in biblical times before its destruction in AD 67, and when rebuilt after the death of Mary Magdalen was renamed "Magdala".

== Personal life ==
Born Margaret Leonard in West Point, New York, Starbird married Army Colonel Edward Starbird in 1968. They had five children, including computer scientist and former professional basketball player Kate Starbird.

Margaret Starbird's father was Army Major General Charles Leonard, who won a silver medal in the modern pentathlon at the 1936 Olympic Games held in Berlin, Germany.

== Criticism ==
Although Starbird's works have very little mention of a continuing sacred bloodline of descendants of Jesus and Mary Magdalen, which is a significant portion of the premises behind such books as The Holy Blood and the Holy Grail, she did state in The Woman With the Alabaster Jar that "there is evidence to suggest that the royal bloodline of Jesus and Mary Magdalen eventually flowed in the veins of the Merovingian monarchs of France", and mistakenly claimed that the fleur-de-lys was the royal emblem of Clovis I (c. 466-511) and the "heraldic emblem of the Merovingian bloodline" – the symbol was a "Capetian innovation, first employed by Robert II of France before the science of heraldry even existed." An anonymous twelfth century poem about the Battle of Tolbiac (c.496) first claimed that Clovis replaced his toad-covered buckler with the fleur-de-lys.

Starbird's theories have been criticized for being based on medieval lore and art, rather than on historical treatment of the Bible. Both Darrell Bock and Bart D. Ehrman have claimed that "There is no reference to Jesus' marriage or a wife in the Four Gospels" and, "There is no reference to Jesus' marriage or a wife in any other early Christian writing".

Starbird's interpretation of the Gnostic Gospels as suggesting an amorous relationship between Jesus and Mary Magdalen is not widely accepted amongst Biblical scholars or skeptics. The (non-canonical) Gospel of Philip states that Mary Magdalen was Jesus' "companion", that Jesus "loved her more than all his disciples", and that he "often kissed her on her [...]". The paragraph concerned describes Mary Magdalene as "barren" and being "the mother of the angels"; one scholar observed that the Gospel of Philip goes so far as to say "that marital relations defile a woman.". Likewise, Starbird has claimed that the medieval Cathars believed Jesus was married to Mary Magdelen, through an interpretation of the Major Arcana of the Tarot, but this is also disputed. Even if one were to acknowledge Starbird's interpretation of these, critics of The Da Vinci Code such as Robert M. Price have countered that no institutional continuity exists between 2nd century Gnostics and medieval Cathars, nor between the Cathars and the Knights Templar as works such as The Holy Blood and the Holy Grail have suggested.

== Works ==
- The Woman with the Alabaster Jar: Mary Magdalen and the Holy Grail (Bear & Co, 1993). ISBN 1-879181-03-7
- The Goddess in the Gospels: Reclaiming the Sacred Feminine (Bear & Co, 1998). ISBN 1-879181-55-X
- The Tarot Trumps and the Holy Grail: Great Secrets of the Middle Ages (Bear & Co, 2000). ISBN 0-9678428-0-8
- Magdalene’s Lost Legacy: Symbolic Numbers and the Sacred Union in Christianity (Bear & Co, 2003). ISBN 1-59143-012-7
- The Feminine Face of Christianity (Godsfield Press Ltd., UK, 2003). ISBN 1-84181-184-X
- Mary Magdalene, Bride in Exile (Bear & Co, 2005). ISBN 1-59143-054-2

Co-authored with Joan Norton

- 14 Steps to Awaken the Sacred Feminine: Women in the Circle of Mary Magdalene (Bear & Co, 2009). ISBN 1-59143-091-7

Documentary

- Margaret Starbird's work is the main subject in the National Geographic TV series "Ancient X Files" in Season 2, Episode 10 "The Mystery of Mary Magdelene" originally broadcast July 3, 2012, on the National Geographic Channel in the UK.

== In popular culture ==
Starbird's works along with those of Lynn Picknett, Michael Baigent, Henry Lincoln, and others were highly influential upon Dan Brown's bestselling novel, The Da Vinci Code and are directly mentioned in that work.

== See also ==
- Jesus bloodline
- The Holy Blood and the Holy Grail
