= Information Systems for Crisis Response and Management =

The Information Systems for Crisis Response and Management (ISCRAM) Community is an international community of researchers, practitioners and policy makers involved in or concerned about the design, development, deployment, use and evaluation of information systems for crisis response and management. The ISCRAM Community has been co-founded by Bartel Van de Walle (Tilburg University, the Netherlands), Benny Carlé (SCK-CEN Nuclear Research Center, Belgium), and Murray Turoff (New Jersey Institute of Technology).

== ISCRAM Conferences ==
ISCRAM conferences have been held annually since 2004. Since 2005, the conference has alternated between Europe and the United States / Canada.

Location (year)	Programme and/or conference chairs
Brussels, Belgium (2004, 2005)	Bartel Van de Walle and Benny Carlé
Newark, New Jersey (2006)	Bartel Van de Walle and Murray Turoff
Delft, the Netherlands (2007)	Bartel Van de Walle, Paul Burghardt, and Kees Nieuwenhuis
Washington, DC (2008)	Bartel Van de Walle, Frank Fiedrich, Jack Harrald, and Theresa Jefferson
Gothenburg, Sweden (2009)	Jonas Landgren, Bartel Van de Walle, and Susanne Jul
Seattle, Washington (2010)	Mark Haselkorn, Simon French, and Brian Tomaszewski
Lisbon, Portugal (2011)	Maria A. Santos, Julie Dugdale, and David Mendonça
Vancouver, Canada (2012)	Brian Fisher, Richard Arias-Hernandez, Leon Rothkrantz, Jozef Ristvej, and Zeno Franco
Baden-Baden, Germany (2013)	Jürgen Beyerer, Thomas Usländer, and Tina Comes
University Park, Pennsylvania (2014)	Andrea Tapia, Starr Roxanne Hiltz, Mark S. Pfaff, Linda Plotnick, and Patrick C. Shih
Kristiansand, Norway (2015)	Leysia Palen, Monika Büscher, Tina Comes, and Amanda Hughes
Rio de Janeiro, Brazil (2016)	Andrea Tapia, Pedro Antunes, Victor A. Bañuls, Kathleen Moore, and João Porto de Albuquerque
Albi, France (2017)	Tina Comes, Frédérick Bénaben, Chihab Hanachi, Matthieu Lauras, and Aurélie Montarnal
Rochester, New York (2018)	Kees Boersma and Brian M. Tomaszewski
Valencia, Spain (2019)	Zeno Franco, José J. González, and José H. Canós
Omaha, Nebraska (2023)	Deepak Khazanchi, Ioannis M. Dokas, Jaziar Radianti, Nick Lalone
Münster, Germany (2024)	

At the conference, the Mike Meleshkin best PhD student paper is awarded to the best paper written and presented by a PhD student. Past awardees are Sebastian Henke (University of Münster, Germany), Jonas Landgren (Viktoria Institute, Sweden), Jiri Trnka (Linkoping University, Sweden), Manuel Llavador (Polytechnic University of Valencia, Spain), Valentin Bertsch (Karlsruhe University, Germany), Thomas Foulquier (Université de Sherbrooke, Canada), and the PhD students in crisis informatics at the University of Colorado at Boulder (USA).

== ISCRAM-CHINA and Summer School ==
Since 2005, an annual conference is also held in China, at Harbin Engineering University, with Dr. Song Yan as conference chair. The 2008 meeting is held jointly with the GI4D meeting on August 4–6, 2008.

The Summer School for PhD students took place in the Netherlands at Tilburg University in June 2006 and 2007.

== ISCRAM Journal ==
The International Journal of Information Systems for Crisis Response and Management (IJISCRAM) is a journal which started in January 2009. Co-Editors-in-Chief are Murray Jennex (San Diego State University) and Bartel Van de Walle (Tilburg University, the Netherlands).

The mission of the International Journal of Information Systems for Crisis Response and Management (IJISCRAM) is to provide an outlet for innovative research in the area of information systems for crisis response and management. Research is expected to be rigorous but can utilize any accepted methodology and may be qualitative or quantitative in nature. The journal will provide a comprehensive cross disciplinary forum for advancing the understanding of the organizational, technical, human, and cognitive issues associated with the use of information systems in responding and managing crises of all kinds. The goal of the journal is to publish high quality empirical and theoretical research covering all aspects of information systems for crisis response and management. Full-length research manuscripts, insightful research and practice notes, and case studies will be considered for publication.
