= Starr Roxanne Hiltz =

American academic

- Born: September 7, 1942 (age 84); Little Rock, Arkansas
- Education: Columbia University, Vassar College
- Occupation: Distinguished Professor Emerita
- Known for: Computer-mediated communication, E-learning
- Awards: EFF Pioneer Award
- Scientific career
- Fields: Information Systems, Sociology
- Workplaces: New Jersey Institute of Technology, Rutgers–Newark

Starr Roxanne Hiltz is a retired Distinguished Professor of Information Science/Information Systems at New Jersey Institute of Technology (NJIT). She, along with Murray Turoff (her husband), are the authors of The Network Nation, a book that is described as "the seminal book that helped define the electronic frontier". Hiltz worked with Turoff on developing the Electronic Information Organizer, a platform where researchers could collaborate on scientific applications. Hiltz and Turoff also worked together to predict how the development of virtual communities would impact society, politics and law. Additionally, her work looks into online learning and group decision-making research, determining how virtual communities impact them. She is also the author of The Virtual Classroom: Learning Without Limits via Computer Networks (1994).

== Education ==
Hiltz attended Vassar College in Poughkeepsie, New York for her undergraduate degree in sociology and minor in economics.

She earned a PhD in sociology at Columbia University. Her doctoral dissertation, "The Consumer Financial System: A Mechanism of Inequality," examined the American consumer finance sector from a sociological perspective.

== Awards and honors ==
- Electronic Frontier Foundation Pioneer Award (1994)
- Sloan-C Award for "Most Outstanding Achievement in Online Teaching and Learning by an Individual” (2004)
- Fulbright-University of Salzburg Distinguished Chair in Communications and Media (2008)
- NSF Faculty Fellowship in Science (1976 - 1977)
- Electronic Networking Association's Rodale Award for Creative Achievement (1990)
