= Murray Turoff =

American computer scientist (1936–2022)

- Born: 13 February 1936; San Francisco, United States
- Died: 28 September 2022 (aged 86); New Jersey, U.S.
- Education: University of California - Berkeley, Brandeis University
- Known for: Computer-mediated communication
- Title: Distinguished Professor Emeritus
- Awards: EFF Pioneer Award
- Scientific career
- Fields: Information and computer science, management
- Workplaces: New Jersey Institute of Technology, Rutgers–Newark

Murray Turoff (February 13, 1936 – October 28, 2022) was a Distinguished Professor at New Jersey Institute of Technology (NJIT) who was a key founding father of computer-mediated communication.

== Career ==
Turoff received his B.A. degree in Mathematics and Physics from the University of California at Berkeley in 1958. He received his PhD in Physics from Brandeis University in 1965.

Turoff has served as Chairperson of the Information Systems Department, acting Chairperson of the Computer and Information Science Department as well as Director of Computerized Conferencing and Communications Center during his tenure at NJIT. He was also simultaneously a member of the faculty at Rutgers Graduate School of Management between 1982 and 2005.

Turoff co-founded the Information Systems for Crisis Response and Management (ISCRAM) community.

After his retirement he held the title Distinguished Professor Emeritus in the Information Systems Department at New Jersey Institute of Technology.

== Major projects ==
Turoff was the designer of the Emergency Management Information System And Reference Index (EMISARI), which was the first group communication-oriented crisis management system and which was used for the 1971 Wage Price Freeze and assorted federal crisis events until the mid-1980s. He designed and implemented EIES (Electronic Information Exchange System) as part of a 25-year research program into the design of structured Computer Mediated Communications Systems (CMC) to conduct field trials and evaluations of alternative applications of human communications via computers.

== Publications ==
He has authored or co-authored 8 books including The Network Nation (with his wife Starr Roxanne Hiltz) which won the TSM Award of the Association of American Publishers for the Best Technical Publication in 1978 which went on to become the defining document and standard reference of its time for the field of computer mediated communication.

== Awards ==
Turoff was awarded the EFF Pioneer Award in 1994 for "significant and influential contributions to computer-based communications and to the empowerment of individuals in using computers." In 2018 he was inducted into the International Academy for Systems and Cybernetic Sciences.
