= Battle of Guerrero =

1916 US victory over Pancho Villa in Mexico

- Part of the Border War, Pancho Villa Expedition, Mexican Revolution
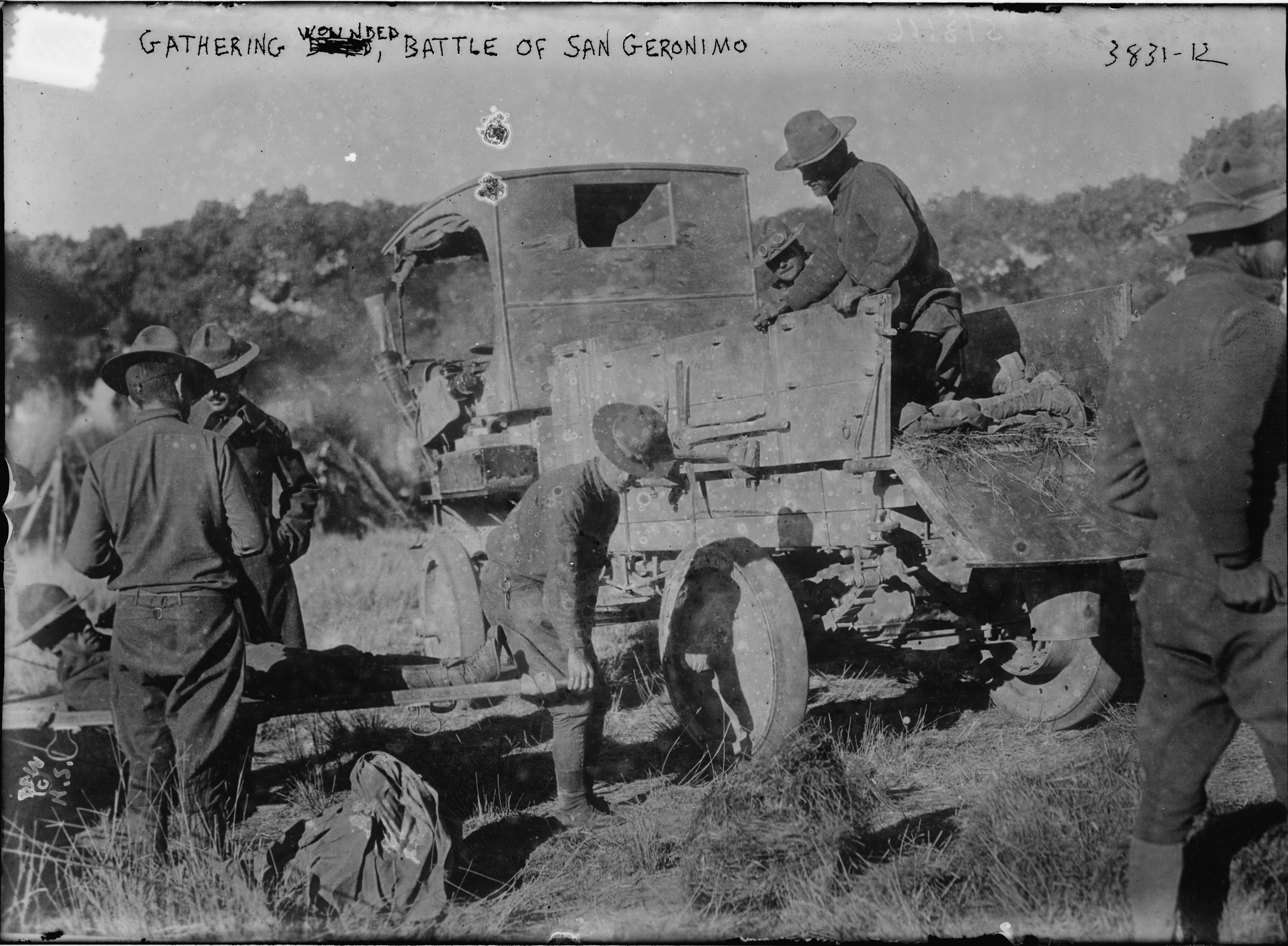
- American soldiers carrying wounded soldiers, Chihuahua, 1916.
Date	March 29, 1916
Location	Guerrero, Chihuahua, Mexico 28°32′52″N 107°29′08″W
Result	United States victory

Belligerents
United States	Villistas

Commanders and leaders
(United States) George A. Dodd	Pancho Villa; Elicio Hernandez †

Strength
370 cavalry	200–500 cavalry

Casualties and losses
5 wounded	56 killed 35 wounded

The Battle of Guerrero, or the Battle of San Gerónimo, in March 1916, was the first military engagement between the rebels of Pancho Villa and the United States during the Mexican Expedition. After a long ride, elements of the American 7th Cavalry Regiment encountered a large force of Villistas at the town of Guerrero in the state of Chihuahua. In what has been called the "last true cavalry charge," the Americans assaulted the town and routed the defenders, inflicting over seventy-five casualties on the Mexicans with the loss of only five men wounded.

== Battle ==
The Mexican Expedition began after Pancho Villa's attack on Columbus, New Mexico, on March 9, 1916, in which eighteen American soldiers and civilians were killed. In response to the incident, General John J. Pershing led the United States Army into Mexico with the intention of capturing, or killing, General Villa. On March 27, Villa and his army made a simultaneous nighttime attack on the towns of San Ysidro, Minaca and Guerrero, which were held by federal Carrancista troops whom Villa was also campaigning against. At Minaca and Guerrero the Villistas captured the garrisons without resistance, but at San Ysidro, the Carrancistas repulsed the attack. Villa was wounded in his right knee cap during the affair. The wound greatly impaired his command ability over the next few weeks and it nearly led to his capture by American forces. When the Battle of San Ysidro was over, the Villistas retreated to Guerrero and prepared defenses. Around this time, General Pershing received intelligence regarding the location of Villa at Guerrero, 230 miles south of Columbus, so he sent a messenger to Colonel George A. Dodd to move his 370-man force of cavalry into the area. Colonel Dodd was to ride as fast as possible to catch Villa before he moved on. When the Americans arrived at Guerrero on March 29, they had traveled about 400 miles in fourteen days, following their departure from Camp Harvey J. Jones in southern Arizona, including fifty-five miles in the seventeen hours after receiving news of Villa's position. The entire expedition was equipped with inaccurate maps of the Mexican frontier so Colonel Dodd and his men had to rely on a civilian guide, named J. B. Baker, who led the cavalry on a "circular march" across the rugged Sierra Madre Occidental.

Much time was lost in the march and the men were exposed to extreme heat during the day and freezing temperatures at night. By the morning of March 29, the Americans were exhausted from their journey, low on rations, and had to fight a battle against a well defended town. According to varying sources, there were between 200 and 500 Villistas at Guerrero, spread out across the town, and for the first couple of hours after the 7th Cavalry's arrival, Dodd had his men attempt to ascertain the number of enemy forces. It wasn't until 8:00 am that the order to attack was given. Dodd divided his command into three contingents with instructions to charge and surround the town in order to cut off the Villistas's avenue of escape. When the Americans charged, fighting erupted at three points. After the charge the Americans dismounted to fight the Mexicans on foot. Guerrero was flanked by mountains on two sides which made it difficult to surround the town and the Villistas used them for cover. There were also not enough cavalrymen to cover all of the escape routes so the majority of the Mexicans got away, including Pancho Villa. Part of the Villista army mounted up and retreated east through a valley. They were pursued by some of the American cavalrymen in a ten-mile running engagement. Another force of Mexicans calmly rode out of Guerrero, pretending to be Carrancistas by displaying a Mexican national flag; this group went unmolested by the 7th Cavalry. Villa lost his friend, General Elicio Hernández, and fifty-five others killed in the battle and another thirty-five wounded. The Americans suffered only five wounded during a five-hour battle. Colonel Dodd and his men also captured thirty-six horses and mules, two machine guns, many small arms and some war supplies. Several condemned Carrancista prisoners were liberated.

Initially the Battle of Guerrero was thought to be a great opening success in the campaign but it later proved to be a disappointment as it would be the closest they came to capturing Villa in battle. However, the battle was considered the "most successful single engagement of Pershing's Punitive Expedition". After the retreat the Villista army dispersed and for the next three months they no longer posed a significant threat to the United States military. Villa himself hid out in the hills while his knee healed. One day, not long after the battle, Villa was camped at the end of a valley and watched a troop of Pershing's cavalrymen ride by. Villa heard them singing "It's a Long Way to Tipperary"; this would be the last time Americans got so close to the general. News of the victory was widely circulated in the United States, prompting the Senate's approval of Colonel Dodd's promotion to brigadier general.

== See also ==
- Mexican Revolution
- Mier Expedition
- Crabb Massacre
- Crawford Affair

== Bibliography ==
- Boot, Max (2003). The Savage Wars of Peace: Small Wars and the Rise of American Power. New York: Basic Books. ISBN 046500721X. LCCN 2004695066.
- Beede, Benjamin R. (1994). The War of 1898, and U.S. interventions, 1898-1934: an encyclopedia. Taylor & Francis. ISBN 0-8240-5624-8.
