= Malkia Cyril =

American poet

- Cyril in 2017
- Born: Malkia Amala Cyril; May 2, 1974 (age 52)
- Education: Sarah Lawrence College (BA)

Malkia Amala Devich-Cyril (born May 2, 1974) is a poet and media activist best known for spearheading national grassroots efforts of the Net Neutrality campaign.

== Biography ==
Born to Janet Cyril, an activist in the Black Panther Party, Devich-Cyril was raised in the Bedford-Stuyvesant neighborhood of Brooklyn, New York. They learned to read at the Liberation Bookstore in Harlem. They refer to growing up in the Black Panther Party as "in and of itself a blessing."

They have framed the discourse on protecting net neutrality as shifting away from the notion of "media democracy" and instead as a case of "media justice." They are the executive director of the Center for Media Justice, and a co-founder of the Media Action Grassroots Network.

Devich-Cyril's writings on media activism frequently appear in national publications such as Politico, the Huffington Post, and The Guardian Creative writing, including poetry and short-stories, have been published in anthologies such as Afrekete: An Anthology of Black Lesbian Writing, Aloud: Voices from the Nuyorican Poets Café, and In the Tradition: An Anthology of Young Black Writers.

== Personal life ==
Devich-Cyril was married to comedian and editor Alana Devich-Cyril, who died in 2018.

== Training ==
- Rockwood Leadership Institute Fellow
- The Root 100
