= Bruce Ennis (attorney) =

American civil rights attorney (d. 2000)

Bruce James Ennis (c. 1940 – 2000) was an American civil rights attorney and founder of the law firm Ennis, Friedman, Bersoff & Ewing, which merged into Jenner & Block in 1988. In 1997, he was awarded the Freedom to Read Foundation Roll of Honor.
