= Guerrero Municipality, Chihuahua =

Municipality in the Mexican state of Chihuahua

Guerrero
- Municipality
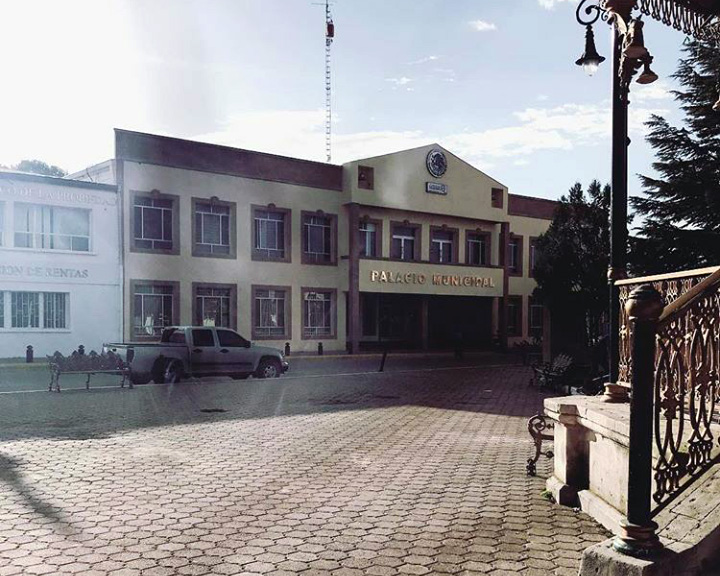
- Municipal Palace

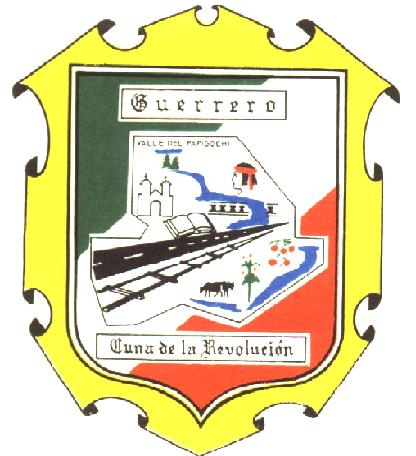
- Coat of arms

- Municipality of Guerrero in Chihuahua
- Coordinates: 28°32′20″N 107°29′30″W
- Country: Mexico
- State: Chihuahua
- Founded: 1826
- Named for: Vicente Guerrero
- Seat: Vicente Guerrero
- Largest city: La Junta

Area
  - Total: 5,603.6 km^{2} (2,163.6 sq mi)

Population (2010)
  - Total: 39,626
  - Density: 7.0715/km^{2} (18.315/sq mi)

Guerrero is one of the 67 municipalities of Chihuahua, in northern Mexico. The municipal seat lies at Vicente Guerrero (a.k.a. Ciudad Guerrero). The municipality covers an area of 5,603.6 km^{2}.

As of 2010, the municipality had a total population of 39,626, up from 37,249 as of 2005.

The municipality had 822 localities, the largest of which (with 2010 populations in parentheses) were: La Junta (8,930), Vicente Guerrero (7,751), Tomochi (2,818), classified as urban, and Basúchil (1,451), and Orozco (San Isidro Pascual Orozco) (1,263), classified as rural.

== Geography ==
=== Towns and villages ===
The municipality has 462 localities. The largest are:

Name	Population (2005)
La Junta	8,702
Guerrero	6,536
Tomochi	2,404
Basúchil	1,376
Calera	1,134
Pachera	848
Total Municipality	8,010

== Municipal presidents ==
- (1989 - 1992): Luis Moya Anchondo
- (1992 - 1995): Carlos Comadurán
- (1995 - 1998): Alfonso Domínguez Carreón
- (1998 - 2001): Jesús Alfredo Velarde Guzmán
- (2001 - 2004): Jorge Morales Morales
- (2004 - 2007): Alfonso Domínguez Carreón
- (2007 - 2010): José Gabriel Almeyda Ochoa
