= 2026 Chihuahua CIA scandal =

Political controversy in Mexico

- Location of El Pinal within Chihuahua
- Date: 16–19 April 2026 (operation and crash)
- Location: El Pinal and near Polanco, Chihuahua, Mexico; 26.670°N 107.695°W
- Type: Road crash; political scandal
- Participants: Chihuahua State Investigation Agency; Secretariat of National Defense; four United States personnel
- Outcome: Resignation of the Chihuahua attorney general; two surviving US personnel asked to leave Mexico
- Deaths: 4
- Arrests: 1

The 2026 Chihuahua CIA scandal is a political controversy in Mexico over the participation of four United States personnel, reported to be officers of the Central Intelligence Agency (CIA), in an anti-drug operation run by the government of Chihuahua in April 2026 without the knowledge of the federal government. Two of the Americans, together with two state police officers, died on 19 April when their vehicle fell into a ravine as the convoy returned from dismantling a methamphetamine laboratory at El Pinal, in the municipality of Morelos.

State officials first described the dead Americans as embassy instructors who had not taken part in the operation. US media, citing anonymous sources, reported that they worked for the CIA, and a state special prosecutor found that four foreigners had traveled with the convoy from the start. President Claudia Sheinbaum said the presence of foreign agents without federal accreditation breached Mexican law and placed the main fault on the state government. Mexico sent a diplomatic note to the United States and asked the two surviving officers to leave the country.

The state attorney general, César Jáuregui Moreno, resigned, and Morena sought the impeachment of Governor Maru Campos of the National Action Party (PAN). Campos denied knowing of the Americans' presence, and the PAN called the campaign political persecution. In October, Jáuregui was arrested on state charges over the operation, and the federal Attorney General's Office (FGR) served him with a further warrant for treason. In late October, judges ordered him to stand trial on a state charge of abuse of public office and on the federal treason charge, and he was held in pretrial detention. He denied wrongdoing, and his supporters called the case politically motivated.

== Background ==
=== US–Mexico security cooperation ===
After Donald Trump returned to office in January 2025, his administration designated several Mexican cartels as foreign terrorist organizations, which CNN reported gave legal cover for additional US intelligence authorities. The CIA expanded a covert drone program over Mexico, flying MQ-9 Reaper surveillance aircraft from 2025; President Claudia Sheinbaum said in 2025 that the flights took place at Mexico's request. The new US ambassador, Ronald Johnson, in office since May 2025, is a former CIA officer.

On 3 September 2025, during a visit to Mexico City by U.S. Secretary of State Marco Rubio, the two governments set up a high-level implementation group to follow up on joint security commitments; their statement said cooperation would rest on "reciprocity, respect for sovereignty and territorial integrity" and would take place "within our respective legal frameworks". In January 2026, Sheinbaum said there were no joint operations in Mexico and that US agents knew the limits set by the Constitution and the National Security Law. When Mexican special forces killed Nemesio Oseguera Cervantes ("El Mencho"), leader of the Jalisco New Generation Cartel, in February 2026, the government acknowledged that CIA intelligence had helped locate him but said there had been no involvement of US forces.

Under amendments to Mexico's National Security Law passed by Congress in December 2020, foreign agents may not operate in the country without federal authorization, must share the information they obtain with the Mexican government and report monthly on their activities to the foreign and security ministries, and have no immunity; Mexican officials need permission to meet them and must report what was discussed. Sheinbaum summarized the requirement in April 2026: personnel of a US agency must be accredited with the Foreign Ministry (SRE) and send it a monthly report on their work in the country.

=== Chihuahua and US agencies ===
Chihuahua has been governed since September 2021 by Maru Campos of the National Action Party (PAN), an opposition party at the federal level. César Jáuregui Moreno, a long-standing PAN politician, served as her general secretary of government from 2021 to 2023 and as state attorney general from January 2023. Under him, Guillermo Arturo Zuany Portillo, a former police commander, headed the strategic operations and anti-kidnapping unit of the State Attorney General's Office (FGE).

In April 2022, Campos signed a border-security memorandum of understanding with the governor of Texas, Greg Abbott, and presented Centinela, a US$200 million surveillance and technology platform. La Jornada reported that the memorandum, together with training agreements with the FBI and the State Department, had given US agencies access to Centinela and its some 4,000 cameras since 2023. According to Reforma, as reported by El Imparcial, the state planned to house personnel of the DEA, the FBI and other US agencies on the 18th floor of the Torre Centinela, its new security headquarters in Ciudad Juárez.

The FGE also had its own arrangements with US counterparts. In April 2026, its spokesman, Eloy García, told The New York Times that it had signed agreements allowing training exercises with US agencies without federal authorization, and that cooperation had intensified after three state agents were intoxicated while handling fentanyl in 2025. In a November 2026 investigation based on unreleased documents, including the state's arrest-warrant request, and on interviews with two dozen anonymous Mexican and US officials, the Times reported that this cooperation extended to the CIA, which had begun working with Zuany around 2025. From the autumn of that year, according to the paper, Zuany introduced a CIA officer to state police as an adviser for a new special forces unit, and CIA officers went on to train state forces and ride along on operations, armed and in tactical gear and sometimes wearing jackets with state insignia; they did not engage in combat but provided intelligence and direction. The Times also reported that the United States had revoked Zuany's visa months earlier over suspected ties to cartels, according to a letter Mexican officials sent to the FBI, and that officials said it was reinstated in return for his help.

== Operation and crash ==
According to the chronology later presented by the state special prosecutor, Wendy Paola Chávez Villanueva, a convoy of about 40 agents of the State Investigation Agency (AEI) left the city of Chihuahua on the morning of 16 April 2026. The AEI director, Pedro Román Oseguera Cervantes, traveled in it with his escort and four foreigners in civilian clothes. That afternoon, the director met the army commander at the barracks in Guachochi, and the convoy, joined by eight vehicles carrying about 50 soldiers of the Secretariat of National Defense (SEDENA), went on to the village of Polanco in the municipality of Batopilas. The column reached El Pinal, in the Sierra Tarahumara, on the afternoon of 17 April. Foot searches the next morning found the laboratory at 07:30; the AEI director notified his superiors, who informed the Attorney General's Office (FGR), and at 17:30 he ordered the return to Chihuahua.

The state described the operation as the result of a three-month investigation by the AEI and SEDENA and attributed the site to the Sinaloa Cartel. Its first release spoke of six clandestine synthetic-drug sites, one of them "one of the largest found in the country", with ovens, gas cylinders and thousands of liters of precursor chemicals. State attorney general César Jáuregui said the laboratories had been detected with a drone and that only the AEI and SEDENA took part. Officials cited by El Imparcial estimated the site's potential output at up to 2.8 tonnes of methamphetamine.

At about 01:50 on Sunday 19 April, a vehicle carrying the AEI director lost control on a dirt road with poor visibility near Polanco, between the municipalities of Morelos and Guachochi, overturned into a ravine and caught fire. All four occupants died: Oseguera Cervantes; his escort, Manuel Genaro Méndez Montes; and two US nationals. In October 2026, Mexican media, citing obituaries and US military material, identified the Americans as Richard Leiter Johnston III, a former United States Army captain who had later joined the Special Forces, and John Dudley Black, a former Marine Corps officer; both had served in Afghanistan. Authorities described the crash as a traffic accident rather than an attack. According to the special prosecutor's report, an escort told the first officer at the scene that the dead were US citizens who served as liaisons of the US Embassy. The bodies were taken to Chihuahua for forensic examination, and the US consulate in Ciudad Juárez claimed the Americans' remains without stating which agency they worked for.

== Disclosure and conflicting accounts ==
On the morning of 19 April, the State Attorney General's Office (FGE) announced the deaths of its two officers and of "two instructor officers of the United States Embassy" who had been returning from the operation. State attorney general César Jáuregui told reporters that the Americans had been carrying out training as part of a normal exchange with US authorities. Ambassador Ronald Johnson wrote on X that he was "deeply saddened by the tragic loss of two U.S. Embassy personnel", the AEI director and an AEI officer. On 20 April, the embassy declined to identify the two or the agency they worked for, saying only that they had been "supporting Chihuahua state authorities' efforts to combat cartel operations".

At her morning press conference on 20 April, President Claudia Sheinbaum said the federal government had not known of any direct work between Chihuahua and US Embassy personnel, and that there were no joint ground or air operations. "The relationship is federal, not state," she said; any such collaboration required federal authorization.

On 21 April, The Washington Post, citing two people familiar with the matter, became the first to report that the two dead Americans worked for the CIA, as part of the agency's expanded role against drug trafficking in the Western Hemisphere. Later that day, The New York Times, citing people familiar with the episode, CNN, citing three people briefed on the matter, and the Associated Press, citing a US official and two other people, reported the same. CBS News also reported it. The CIA, the State Department and the embassy declined to comment.

The Chihuahua government's account changed as scrutiny grew. At a state security meeting in Ciudad Juárez on 20 April, Jáuregui said the AEI director had met the American instructors by chance in Polanco, where they had been teaching a course on handling drones, and that they had asked to ride with the convoy to catch a flight from Chihuahua the next morning; since they had never been at the laboratory, he said, there had been no reason to inform the president. In an interview the next day, he repeated that they had not taken part in the operation and said he did not know which agency they belonged to. A late statement from the FGE on 20 April instead had the instructors going to the site after the operation, while the spokesman Eloy García told The New York Times that they were present under a training agreement with the US government that did not require federal approval. The Associated Press summarized that local officials had originally said they were working with the US on the operation, but "later walked those comments back" once Sheinbaum began to scrutinize those claims. On 21 April, Sheinbaum said the state attorney general had changed his statement and that the information available to the federal government was that the Americans had been "working jointly" with the state.

On 27 April, the special prosecutor, Wendy Paola Chávez Villanueva, presented a chronology based on about 50 interviews and 10 expert reports. It found that four people from outside the FGE, unarmed and in civilian clothes, with their faces covered most of the time, had joined the convoy in Chihuahua on 16 April and dealt directly with the AEI director; two were the dead Americans, and the FGE believed the other two were also US citizens. She found no record that the director had sought authorization or informed his superiors, and said the evidence suggested "a possible collaboration of an unofficial nature". The report contradicted Jáuregui's account of a chance meeting in Polanco.

Jáuregui resigned on the night of 27 April, minutes after Chávez presented her chronology, announcing in a video message that he had submitted his resignation to Governor Maru Campos. He said the information he had initially shared with the public "was inconsistent and warranted an investigation", that there had been "omissions, both in information and in institutional management, regarding the points of contact with those persons", and that he accepted political responsibility for them; he also called the laboratory one of the largest in the country's history. His deputy, Francisco Sáenz Soto, became acting attorney general. Sheinbaum said the next day that the investigation "doesn't stop at a resignation". On 13 May, Zuany also resigned after Campos said she had instructed the FGE to proceed "regardless of who might fall"; the FGE had opened an administrative proceeding against him over a possible omission during the operation.

The special prosecutor's description of the foreigners as unarmed was later questioned: on 12 May, Chávez showed footage from 16 April of one of them holding a long gun inside the offices of the FGE's strategic operations unit, which the foreigners had visited twice before the operation. The New York Times reported in November that the four CIA officers had met Zuany and other state officials several times in the days before the operation and had helped the Mexican agents locate the laboratory. Citing the warrant request and people present, it also reported that Zuany, who had not taken part in the operation, was called from the scene of the crash and told the agents to remove the CIA officers' bodies and make sure they were not wearing Mexican government insignia, and that he afterward pressured agents to conceal the CIA's presence when they were questioned.

== Responses ==
=== Federal government ===
On 22 April, President Claudia Sheinbaum said the Secretariat of Foreign Affairs (SRE) had written to Ambassador Ronald Johnson asking for full information and stating that what had happened was "not part of the security protocol we have agreed"; she called it "a matter of national security and sovereignty". The weekly Zeta described the note as a formal protest requesting the agents' identities, date of entry, and role. She said the foreign ministry, the defense ministry and the Secretariat of Security and Citizen Protection (SSPC) had all been checked and none had been told, and that Mexico did not accept foreign participation in field operations. The next day she said the US ambassador should have informed the federal authorities, "but the main failing lies with the state government that requested this collaboration", which she said contravened the Constitution and the National Security Law. She said she did not want a conflict with the United States. The federal security secretary, Omar García Harfuch, said US agencies exchanged information with Mexico but had never taken part in field operations.

On 25 April, the federal Security Cabinet stated that neither it nor the SRE had known that foreign agents were operating in the country. One of the two dead Americans had entered Mexico as a visitor without permission to work and the other on a diplomatic passport, and neither had formal accreditation to take part in operations. On 27 April, Sheinbaum said the diplomatic note had told the US that the federal government had not known of these people's participation and expressed hope that the case would be "an exception", and that the United States agreed that the Constitution and Mexican law should be upheld. The next day, she said the US had replied that it would abide by existing agreements and by Mexican law and the Constitution; asked whether the agents would be expelled, she said "not right now".

After a first contact with García Harfuch and Interior Secretary Rosa Icela Rodríguez, Governor Maru Campos met García Harfuch at the SSPC in Mexico City on 23 April, accompanied by César Jáuregui and the state security secretary, Gilberto Loya Chávez, with Foreign Ministry officials also taking part. According to Sheinbaum, the governor agreed to provide information and was told that the procedure for collaborating with a foreign government had not been followed. García Harfuch later said Campos had told him she had not known of any operation with US agents in the field. On 24 April, Campos announced a special unit, headed by Chávez, to investigate the events, and said her government would make no statements while it worked.

The same day, Sheinbaum said a letter was being sent to the governments of all 31 states and Mexico City, stating that any security collaboration with a foreign agency must follow the Constitution and the National Security Law and be channeled through the SRE or the federal Security Cabinet. "There is something that is not negotiable," she said: "sovereignty and principles". She contrasted her position with that of former president Felipe Calderón, whom she accused of having let foreign agents operate on the ground. On 27 April, she dismissed the need for a state investigative unit, saying the responsibility lay either with the state prosecutor's office or with the security secretary.

On 27 May, Sheinbaum said that four Americans had been involved: two had died, and Mexico had asked the other two, who lacked accreditation, to leave the country, which they did. She said they had entered legally, with diplomatic or tourist status, but had not followed the protocol under which the SRE and the Security Cabinet approve the stay of foreign personnel doing intelligence work. The request was made through a note to the embassy, and the two chose to leave rather than register formally. Asked about foreign agents on 20 July, Sheinbaum said about 250 were accredited in Mexico, that all had to comply with the Constitution and the National Security Law and report monthly on their activities, and that after the Chihuahua case Mexico had asked the embassy to withdraw those without permission, since "it is always better to use the diplomatic route".

=== Congress and parties ===
On 22 April, the Senate's Constitutional Affairs Committee voted 15–1 to invite Campos and Jáuregui to a working meeting to explain the events. Morena and PAN senators voted in favor; the only vote against came from Luis Donaldo Colosio Riojas of Citizens' Movement, who argued that answering a breach of national security by encroaching on state sovereignty was incoherent. PAN leader Ricardo Anaya said his party would gladly vote for the governor to come and explain "how organized crime really is fought", while demanding that the Morena governor of Sinaloa, Rubén Rocha Moya, also appear. Javier Corral, a Morena senator and former governor of Chihuahua, said the state government had fallen into "a cascade of lies". The plenary approved the invitation, which was not binding. Campos declined to attend the meeting on 28 April, writing that her appearance could compromise confidential information in the investigations; "We answer to our people, not to the Senate," she told a journalist. On 24 April, the Congress of Chihuahua had blocked a request for Campos and Jáuregui to appear before it on the matter.

The Labor Party (PT) leader in the Chamber of Deputies, Reginaldo Sandoval, called for impeachment against Campos for treason. On 12 May, Morena's national president, Ariadna Montiel, announced a march in Chihuahua for 16 May to demand the removal of Campos's immunity from prosecution, backed by the Morena leader in the Chamber of Deputies, Ricardo Monreal. Montiel said the governor had broken state and federal law, since only the federal government could request help from a foreign country. On 26 May, eleven Morena members of the Congress of Chihuahua filed an impeachment request with the federal Chamber of Deputies, alleging a violation of national sovereignty amounting to treason; because the deputies who filed it did not ratify it within the three days allowed, which ran to 29 May, the chamber's president, Kenia López Rabadán of the PAN, declared that it was deemed not to have been filed and had never reached the committee stage.

Campos made her first substantive statement on 12 May, after Morena announced its impeachment push. She said she had neither arranged nor authorized the Americans' presence and had not known of it, defended the operation as the work of trained police investigators, and accused Morena of looking for culprits "to cover up the crisis and lack of results". The PAN national president, Jorge Romero, pledged the party's full support for Campos and described the offensive as retaliation for the PAN's own impeachment request against Rocha Moya. After the Attorney General's Office (FGR) summoned the governor in May, the state government called the summons political persecution "ordered from the National Palace", and former president Felipe Calderón called Morena "cowards and hypocrites"; the Interior Ministry replied that the FGR was autonomous and had no political interest. On 30 May, the PAN held a rally under the slogan "#YoConMaru" in Chihuahua, attended by Calderón and former president Vicente Fox. Analysts quoted by Expansión saw the party's defense of Campos as a way to unite its members and to hold Chihuahua in the 2027 state election.

== Investigations and prosecutions ==
=== Investigations ===
The Attorney General's Office (FGR) opened its file on 18 April, after the FGE telephoned it once the operation had already been carried out. According to La Razón, when federal investigators reached the site, local authorities did not hand over the scene, evidence or substances with a chain of custody, and the FGR recorded "various anomalies". It opened two lines of inquiry, one into the laboratory and one into the presence of foreign agents, and received the state's case file on 27 April after repeated requests; the foreign-agents inquiry was assigned to its special unit for complex cases. About 50 state personnel were summoned to testify in Ciudad Juárez, and the FGR also interviewed the soldiers who had provided perimeter security. On 13 May, the FGR added a line of inquiry into whether the state prosecutor's office had encroached on exclusive federal powers over narcotics offenses under the General Health Law, foreign relations and national security.

A special unit of the state prosecutor's office headed by Wendy Paola Chávez Villanueva ran a parallel investigation. It produced the 27 April chronology and, on 12 May, reported that the foreigners had been inside the strategic operations offices twice and that there was no record that the AEI director or other officials had sought authorization or informed their superiors. Its file then held about 50 statements, 10 expert reports and more than 6,000 hours of video.

On 23 May, federal officials served Governor Maru Campos at the Government Palace with a summons to be interviewed as a witness, and the FGR said César Jáuregui had also been summoned as a witness because of his place in the chain of command. President Claudia Sheinbaum described the summonses as ordinary investigative procedure. On 27 May, Jáuregui answered questions as a witness for about two and a half hours at the FGR's office in Ciudad Juárez. Campos instead appeared outside FGR headquarters in Mexico City with PAN leaders, saying "today the persecuted one is the governor of Chihuahua; tomorrow it could be you", while her lawyer delivered a written statement disputing the federal prosecutors' power to compel a sitting governor.

=== Criminal proceedings ===
César Jáuregui Moreno in July 2026

By October, Campos had broken with her former attorney general. She and Sheinbaum met privately on 19 September, and later gave conflicting accounts of the meeting: Sheinbaum said Campos had told her "it wasn't me, it was the prosecutor", while Campos denied having accused Jáuregui and said the federal government already knew she had been unaware of the agents. In an interview on 14 October, Campos said that Jáuregui and others in the FGE had "acted on their own" in the El Pinal case and that "this cannot be forgiven". Jáuregui, who had announced in June that he would seek the PAN's nomination for mayor of the city of Chihuahua, replied in a video the next day that he had committed no crime and would dismantle the laboratory again.

On 16 October, a state judge issued arrest warrants for Jáuregui and Guillermo Arturo Zuany Portillo at the FGE's request. Jáuregui was charged under the Chihuahua criminal code with abuse of public office and conspiracy among public servants, and Zuany with the same offenses and with making false statements to authorities. Jáuregui was arrested in the city of Chihuahua the next morning. At his first hearing, the state prosecutor's office alleged that he had ordered the four foreigners to join the operation and had concealed their role by saying the dead men had been there for drone training. It also presented hotel, car-rental and geolocation records that, it said, placed Johnston in Chihuahua in October 2025 and again in January 2026. Jáuregui said there was "not one order, not one WhatsApp" linking him to the decision to include the Americans, and his defense said the evidence did not show his participation.

That evening, the FGR served him with a federal warrant for treason. When the state judge declined to order his pretrial detention on 18 October, federal agents took him into custody as he left court and transferred him to the Altiplano federal prison. The Attorney General, Ernestina Godoy, alleged that he had allowed foreigners to operate in Mexico without authorization and had concealed information from the federal authorities. His lawyer, Héctor Villasana, said the FGR had turned a witness into a suspect without new evidence in order to hamper his political career. Sheinbaum said the state charges showed that the Chihuahua authorities acknowledged Jáuregui as "the main person responsible" for the participation of US agents in the operation. Campos backed the arrest, saying that no one who served or had served in her government was above the law, but called the treason charge disproportionate.

On 22 October, the state judge ordered Jáuregui to stand trial for abuse of public office but dismissed the conspiracy charge, finding that the FGE had not met the legal requirements to establish it, and gave prosecutors two months to complete their investigation; his lawyer called the ruling politically motivated and said he would appeal. In the federal case, a judge ordered him held in pretrial detention on 21 October, and on 24 October Judge Ricardo Alfonso Santos Dorantes ordered him to stand trial for treason, keeping him in custody at Altiplano.

On 10 November, García Harfuch said that both the FGR and the state prosecutor's office had arrest warrants in force against Zuany, who had sought to block the state warrant through the courts. Two days later, The New York Times, citing anonymous US and Mexican officials, reported that Zuany had fled to the United States after Jáuregui's arrest and was under the protection of the US government; he did not respond to a request for comment. Campos's office said the accusations against Zuany and Jáuregui represented "a serious failure" and that she had "taken responsibility for correcting the controls that made it possible".

== Wider reporting on CIA activity in Mexico ==
On 12 May, CNN reported, citing anonymous sources, that officers of the CIA's paramilitary Ground Branch had "directly participated" since 2025 in deadly attacks on several mostly mid-level cartel members in Mexico, including the car bombing that killed Francisco Beltrán near Mexico City on 28 March 2026. CNN described the Chihuahua deaths as "the first hints" of this campaign and reported that all four Americans on the El Pinal raid had been Ground Branch members. The New York Times gave a different account of the Beltrán killing, reporting that Mexican authorities carried it out with CIA intelligence and planning support and that no CIA officers were on site.

A CIA spokesperson called CNN's report "false and salacious", without specifying what was wrong in it. Omar García Harfuch said Mexico categorically rejected any suggestion of lethal or covert operations by foreign agencies on its territory, and President Claudia Sheinbaum dismissed both reports as fabrications. CNN said it stood by its reporting, and the Times said it "remains confident in the accuracy of what we reported". José Luis Valdés Ugalde of the National Autonomous University of Mexico told CNN that working through a state government rather than the federal one spoke of US distrust of Mexico's federal authorities.

== See also ==
- Mexico–United States relations
- Mexican drug war
