= Navia =

Navia may refer to:

- Nabia or Navia, pre-Roman Hispano-Celtic deity of Iberian peninsula
- Navia (San Luis), a village and municipality in San Luis Province, Argentina
- Navia, Iran, a village in North Khorasan Province
- Navia, Asturias, a municipality in the Principality of Asturias, Spain
  - Navia (parish)
- Navia (river), in Spain
- Navia (plant), a genus of bromeliads
- Navia (spirit), a type of water deities in Slavic paganism
- Navia (vehicle), an electric eight-passenger robotically driven vehicle made by France's Induct Technology
- Navia Robinson (born 2005), American actress
- Navia Nguyen (born 1973), Vietnamese-American model and actress
- Navia, a character in 2020 video game Genshin Impact
- Reinaldo Navia (born 1978), Chilean football striker
- Rafael Nieto Navia (born 1938), Colombian jurist, political scientist and professor
