= Posht-e Bam =

Posht-e Bam or Posht Bam (Persian: پشت بام) may refer to:

- Posht Bam, Kohgiluyeh and Boyer-Ahmad
- Posht-e Bam, North Khorasan
