= Jáuregui =

Jáuregui (from Basque: palace or manor house) may refer to:

== Places ==
- José María Jáuregui, Buenos Aires, Buenos Aires Province, Argentina
- Santa Fe–Carlos Jáuregui (Buenos Aires Underground), subway station in Buenos Aires, Argentina
- Santa Rosa Jáuregui, Querétaro, Mexico
- Jáuregui Municipality, Táchira, Venezuela; see La Grita

== People with the surname Jáuregui ==
- Antonio Jauregui, bass player for the Peruvian band Libído
- Carlos Jáuregui (activist) (1957–1996), Argentine LGBT rights activist
- Carlos Jáuregui (chess player) (1932–2013), Chilean–Canadian chess master
- César Jáuregui Moreno, Mexican lawyer and former attorney general of Chihuahua
- César Jáuregui Robles, Mexican lawyer and politician, former member of the Federal Judiciary Council
- El Texano (1958–2006), ring name of Mexican professional wrestler Juan Aguilar Jáuregui
- Enrique Urbizu Jáuregui (born 1962), Spanish film director and screenwriter
- Fernando Jáuregui (born 1950), Spanish journalist with the show Mesa de redacción broadcast by Telecinco in Spain
- Hugo Jauregui, head coach of the Argentine squad for the 2003 FIVB Women's World Cup
- Ignacio Jáuregui (born 1938), player and manager of the Mexican soccer club C.F. Monterrey
- Igor Jauregi (born 1974), Spanish soccer player
- Imanol Jáuregui Tasso, a character in the Mexican telenovela Primer amor... a mil por hora
- Javier Jáuregui (boxer) (1973–2013), Mexican boxer
- Javier Jauregui (footballer) (born 1975), Spanish footballer
- José María Jáuregui (1896–1988), Spanish football goalkeeper
- Juan Martín Jauregui (born 1979), Argentine actor
- Julio Jauregui, participant in the debate concerning Irujo's Basque Republic proposal
- Julio Jáuregui, owner of A1 Team Mexico
- Lauren Jauregui (born 1996), American singer and songwriter
- Mario Jáuregui, Mexican footballer; see 1996–97 Atlante F.C. season
- Quentin Jaurégui (born 1994), French racing cyclist
- Ramón Jáuregui, leader of the Socialist Party of the Basque Country–Basque Country Left
- Roberto Jáuregui (1960–1994), Argentine journalist and human rights activist
- Sergio Jáuregui (born 1985), Bolivian soccer defender
- Yazmin Jauregui (born 1999), Mexican mixed martial artist

== People with the surname de Jáuregui ==
- Agustín de Jáuregui (c. 1711–1784), Spanish politician and soldier who served as governor of Chile and viceroy of Peru
- Gaspar de Jáuregui ('the Shepherd'), Basque guerrilla who became Comandante General of the Basque Provinces; see Tomás de Zumalacárregui
- Heidi Urbahn de Jauregui (born 1940), French academic and essayist, emeritus professor of German Literature
- Juan de Jáuregui (assassin) (1562–1582), failed assassin of Prince William I of Orange
- Juan de Jáuregui (1583–1641), Spanish poet, scholar and painter
- Pablo de Olavide y Jáuregui (1725–1803), Peruvian-born Spanish politician, lawyer and writer
