= César Jáuregui =

César Jáuregui may refer to:

- César Jáuregui Moreno (born 1966), Mexican politician from Baja California, attorney general of Chihuahua in 2023–2026
- César Jáuregui Robles (born 1961), Mexican politician from Coahuila, national-list senator in 2000–2006
