= Kotalli =

Village in North Khorasan province, Iran

Kotalli Persian: كتلي
- Village
- Location within Iran
- Coordinates: 37°18′30″N 57°00′36″E
- Country: Iran
- Province: North Khorasan
- County: Jajrom
- District: Jolgeh Shuqan
- Rural District: Tabar

Population (2016)
  - Total: 348
- Time zone: UTC+3:30 (IRST)

Kotalli (Persian: كتلي) (Note: Also romanized as Kotallī) is a village in Tabar Rural District of Jolgeh Shuqan District (Note: Formerly Dashtkuh District) in Jajrom County, North Khorasan province, Iran.

== Demographics ==
=== Population ===
At the time of the 2006 National Census, the village's population was 411 in 107 households. The following census in 2011 counted 371 people in 107 households. The 2016 census measured the population of the village as 348 people in 114 households.
