= Chowchik Ab =

Village in North Khorasan province, Iran

Chowchik Ab Persian: چوچيك اب
- Village
- Location within Iran
- Country: Iran
- Province: North Khorasan
- County: Jajrom
- District: Jolgeh Shuqan
- Rural District: Shuqan

Population (2016)
  - Total: 0
- Time zone: UTC+3:30 (IRST)

Chowchik Ab (Persian: چوچيك اب) (Note: Also romanized as Chowchīk Āb; also known as Emāmzādeh-ye Chechīk Āb and Emāmzādeh-ye Chowchīk Āb) is a village in Shuqan Rural District (Note: Formerly Jolgeh Shuqan Rural District) of Jolgeh Shuqan District, (Note: Formerly Dashtkuh District) Jajrom County, North Khorasan province, Iran.

== Demographics ==
=== Population ===
At the time of the 2006 National Census, the village's population was five in five households. The village did not appear in the following census of 2011. The 2016 census measured the population of the village as zero.
