= Emarat, Jajrom =

Village in North Khorasan province, Iran

Emarat Persian: عمارت
- Village
- Location within Iran
- Coordinates: 37°19′31″N 56°44′29″E
- Country: Iran
- Province: North Khorasan
- County: Jajrom
- District: Jolgeh Shuqan
- Rural District: Shuqan

Population (2016)
  - Total: 194
- Time zone: UTC+3:30 (IRST)

Emarat (Persian: عمارت) (Note: Also romanized as ‘Emārat; also known as ‘Abbāsābād) is a village in Shuqan Rural District (Note: Formerly Jolgeh Shuqan Rural District) of Jolgeh Shuqan District, (Note: Formerly Dashtkuh District) Jajrom County, North Khorasan province, Iran.

== Demographics ==
=== Population ===
At the time of the 2006 National Census, the village's population was 229 in 64 households. The following census in 2011 counted 219 people in 72 households. The 2016 census measured the population of the village as 194 people in 61 households.
