= Shuqan Rural District =

Rural district in North Khorasan province, Iran

Shuqan Rural District Persian: دهستان شوقان
- Rural District
- Location within Iran
- Coordinates: 37°19′48″N 56°48′36″E
- Country: Iran
- Province: North Khorasan
- County: Jajrom
- District: Jolgeh Shuqan
- Established: 1987
- Capital: Shuqan

Population (2016)
  - Total: 2,497
- Time zone: UTC+3:30 (IRST)

Shuqan Rural District (Persian: دهستان شوقان) (Note: Formerly Jolgeh Shuqan Rural District (دهستان جلگه شوقان)) is in Jolgeh Shuqan District (Note: Formerly Dashtkuh District) of Jajrom County, North Khorasan province, Iran. It is administered from the city of Shuqan. The previous capital of the rural district was the village of Jushqan, now in Tabar Rural District.

== Demographics ==
=== Population ===
At the time of the 2006 National Census, the rural district's population was 2,538 in 725 households. There were 2,520 inhabitants in 794 households at the following census of 2011. The 2016 census measured the population of the rural district as 2,497 in 779 households. The most populous of its 19 villages was Hesar-e Isa, with 643 people.

=== Other villages in the rural district ===
- Bam
- Chapeh
- Chowchik Ab
- Do Borjeh
- Emarat
- Joghdi
- Kalateh-ye Shoqan
- Naviar
- Posht-e Bam
- Qarajeh-ye Robat
