= Tabar, Iran =

Village in North Khorasan province, Iran

Tabar Persian: طبر
- Village
- Location within Iran
- Coordinates: 37°18′09″N 56°53′58″E
- Country: Iran
- Province: North Khorasan
- County: Jajrom
- District: Jolgeh Shuqan
- Rural District: Tabar

Population (2016)
  - Total: 755
- Time zone: UTC+3:30 (IRST)

Tabar (Persian: طبر) (Note: Also romanized as Ţabar; also known as Tavār and Tīr) is a village in, and the capital of, Tabar Rural District in Jolgeh Shuqan District (Note: Formerly Dashtkuh District) of Jajrom County, North Khorasan province, Iran.

== Demographics ==
=== Population ===
At the time of the 2006 National Census, the village's population was 1,025 in 298 households. The following census in 2011 counted 978 people in 299 households. The 2016 census measured the population of the village as 755 people in 275 households.
