= Qarajeh-ye Robat =

Village in North Khorasan province, Iran

Qarajeh-ye Robat Persian: قراجه رباط
- Village
- Location within Iran
- Coordinates: 37°18′24″N 56°44′20″E
- Country: Iran
- Province: North Khorasan
- County: Jajrom
- District: Jolgeh Shuqan
- Rural District: Shuqan

Population (2016)
  - Total: 269
- Time zone: UTC+3:30 (IRST)

Qarajeh-ye Robat (Persian: قراجه رباط) (Note: Also romanized as Qarājeh-ye Robāţ) is a village in Shuqan Rural District (Note: Formerly Jolgeh Shuqan Rural District) of Jolgeh Shuqan District, (Note: Formerly Dashtkuh District) Jajrom County, North Khorasan province, Iran.

== Demographics ==
=== Population ===
At the time of the 2006 National Census, the village's population was 243 in 61 households. The following census in 2011 counted 254 people in 74 households. The 2016 census measured the population of the village as 269 people in 71 households.
