= Pish Darreh =

Village in North Khorasan province, Iran

Pish Darreh Persian: پيش دره
- Village
- Location within Iran
- Coordinates: 37°18′26″N 56°48′03″E
- Country: Iran
- Province: North Khorasan
- County: Jajrom
- District: Jolgeh Shuqan
- Rural District: Tabar

Population (2016)
  - Total: 256
- Time zone: UTC+3:30 (IRST)

Pish Darreh (Persian: پيش دره) (Note: Also romanized as Pīsh Darreh; also known as Peshī Dar) is a village in Tabar Rural District of Jolgeh Shuqan District (Note: Formerly Dashtkuh District) in Jajrom County, North Khorasan province, Iran.

== Demographics ==
=== Population ===
At the time of the 2006 National Census, the village's population was 259 in 62 households. The following census in 2011 counted 265 people in 77 households. The 2016 census measured the population of the village as 256 people in 80 households.
