= Jushqan, Jajrom =

Village in North Khorasan province, Iran

Jushqan Persian: جوشقان
- Village
- Location within Iran
- Country: Iran
- Province: North Khorasan
- County: Jajrom
- District: Jolgeh Shuqan
- Rural District: Tabar

Population (2016)
  - Total: 506
- Time zone: UTC+3:30 (IRST)

Jushqan (Persian: جوشقان) (Note: Also romanized as Jūshqān) is a village in Tabar Rural District of Jolgeh Shuqan District (Note: Formerly Dashtkuh District) in Jajrom County, North Khorasan province, Iran. It was the capital of Jolgeh Shuqan Rural District (Note: Renamed Shuqan Rural District) until its capital was transferred to the village of Shuqan, now a city.

== Demographics ==
=== Population ===
At the time of the 2006 National Census, the village's population was 561 in 152 households. The following census in 2011 counted 564 people in 181 households. The 2016 census measured the population of the village as 506 people in 159 households.
