= Chahar Bid, North Khorasan =

Village in North Khorasan province, Iran

Chahar Bid Persian: چهاربید
- Village
- Location within Iran
- Coordinates: 37°18′14″N 56°58′28″E
- Country: Iran
- Province: North Khorasan
- County: Jajrom
- District: Jolgeh Shuqan
- Rural District: Tabar

Population (2016)
  - Total: 1,329
- Time zone: UTC+3:30 (IRST)

Chahar Bid (Persian: چهاربيد) (Note: Also romanized as Chahār Bīd) is a village in Tabar Rural District of Jolgeh Shuqan District (Note: Formerly Dashtkuh District) in Jajrom County, North Khorasan province, Iran.

== Demographics ==
=== Population ===
At the time of the 2006 National Census, the village's population was 1,546 in 416 households. The following census in 2011 counted 1,315 people in 430 households. The 2016 census measured the population of the village as 1,329 people in 438 households, the most populous in its rural district.
