= Cheshmeh Tabari =

Village in North Khorasan province, Iran

Cheshmeh Tabari Persian: چشمه طبري
- Village
- Location within Iran
- Coordinates: 37°17′53″N 56°50′02″E
- Country: Iran
- Province: North Khorasan
- County: Jajrom
- District: Jolgeh Shuqan
- Rural District: Tabar

Population (2016)
  - Total: 71
- Time zone: UTC+3:30 (IRST)

Cheshmeh Tabari (Persian: چشمه طبري) (Note: Also romanized as Cheshmeh Ţabarī) is a village in Tabar Rural District of Jolgeh Shuqan District (Note: Formerly Dashtkuh District) in Jajrom County, North Khorasan province, Iran.

== Demographics ==
=== Population ===
At the time of the 2006 National Census, the village's population was 111 in 26 households. The following census in 2011 counted 93 people in 22 households. The 2016 census measured the population of the village as 71 people in 24 households.
