= Joghdi =

Village in North Khorasan province, Iran

Joghdi Persian: جغدي
- Village
- Location within Iran
- Coordinates: 37°20′59″N 56°48′47″E
- Country: Iran
- Province: North Khorasan
- County: Jajrom
- District: Jolgeh Shuqan
- Rural District: Shuqan

Population (2016)
  - Total: 643
- Time zone: UTC+3:30 (IRST)

Joghdi (Persian: جغدي) (Note: Also romanized as Joghdī; also known as Joghdt) is a village in Shuqan Rural District (Note: Formerly Jolgeh Shuqan Rural District) of Jolgeh Shuqan District, (Note: Formerly Dashtkuh District) Jajrom County, North Khorasan province, Iran.

== Demographics ==
=== Population ===
At the time of the 2006 National Census, the village's population was 112 in 31 households. The following census in 2011 counted 115 people in 35 households. The 2016 census measured the population of the village as 104 people in 33 households.
