= Hesar-e Isa =

Village in North Khorasan province, Iran

Hesar-e Isa Persian: حصار عيسي
- Village
- Location within Iran
- Coordinates: 37°19′35″N 56°58′12″E
- Country: Iran
- Province: North Khorasan
- County: Jajrom
- District: Jolgeh Shuqan
- Rural District: Shuqan

Population (2016)
  - Total: 643
- Time zone: UTC+3:30 (IRST)

Hesar-e Isa (Persian: حصارعيسي) (Note: Also romanized as Ḩeşār-e ‘Īsá; also known as Ḩeşār) is a village in Shuqan Rural District (Note: Formerly Jolgeh Shuqan Rural District) of Jolgeh Shuqan District, (Note: Formerly Dashtkuh District) Jajrom County, North Khorasan province, Iran.

== Demographics ==
=== Population ===
At the time of the 2006 National Census, the village's population was 592 in 154 households. The following census in 2011 counted 655 people in 189 households. The 2016 census measured the population of the village as 643 people in 186 households, the most populous in its rural district.
