= César Jáuregui Robles =

Mexican politician and lawyer

- Born: Sergio César Alejandro Jáuregui Robles; 6 October 1961 (age 65); Torreón, Coahuila, Mexico
- Occupations: Lawyer and politician
- Political party: National Action Party (PAN)

Sergio César Alejandro Jáuregui Robles (born 6 October 1961) is a Mexican lawyer and politician affiliated with the National Action Party (PAN). He has represented his party in both chambers of Congress, was a member of the Council of the Federal Judiciary and served in the government of the state of Chihuahua from 2016 to 2019.

== Political career ==
César Jáuregui Robles was born in Torreón, Coahuila, in 1961 and earned a law degree from the Chihuahua campus of the Monterrey Institute of Technology and Higher Education (ITESM) in 1984. He joined the PAN in 1981.

He has been elected to a plurinominal seat in the Chamber of Deputies on two occasions: in the 1991 mid-terms (55th Congress), and in the 1997 mid-terms (57th Congress). In the 2000 general election, he was elected to the Senate from the PAN's national list.

From 2009 to 2014, he was a member of the Council of the Federal Judiciary. In 2016, Governor of Chihuahua Javier Corral appointed him secretary of government in his cabinet, a position where he remained until 2019.

== Family ==
César Jáuregui Moreno, who served as Chihuahua's secretary of government under Governor Maru Campos from 2021 to 2023, is not a relative.
