= Shuqan =

City in North Khorasan province, Iran

Shuqan Persian: شوقان
- City
- Location within Iran
- Coordinates: 37°20′25″N 56°53′12″E
- Country: Iran
- Province: North Khorasan
- County: Jajrom
- District: Jolgeh Shuqan
- Established as a city: 2000

Population (2016)
  - Total: 2,313
- Time zone: UTC+3:30 (IRST)

Shuqan (Persian: شوقان) (Note: Also known as Shoqan and Shoqān) is a city in, and the capital of, Jolgeh Shuqan District (Note: Formerly Dashtkuh District) in Jajrom County, North Khorasan province, Iran. It is also serves as the administrative center for Shuqan Rural District. (Note: Formerly Jolgeh Shuqan Rural District) The previous capital of the rural district was the village of Jushqan, now in Tabar Rural District. The village of Shuqan was converted to a city in 2000.

== Demographics ==
=== Ethnicity ===
The city is populated by Kurds.

=== Population ===
At the time of the 2006 National Census, the city's population was 2,297 in 628 households. The following census in 2011 counted 2,436 people in 742 households. The 2016 census measured the population of the city as 2,313 people in 758 households.

== Geography ==
The city of Shuqan, which is located 64 kilometers from Bojnord, the capital of North Khorasan province, is famous as the center of the Shuqan Plain and a summer town in the region. It has a mountainous and moderate climate, which is located in the north of Aladagh mountain and in the south of Saluk and Bahar mountains.
