= Garmok =

Garmok may refer to:

- Garmak, Jajrom, a village in North Khorasan Province, Iran
- Garmak, Maneh and Samalqan, a village in North Khorasan Province, Iran
