= Mohammadabad-e Tabar =

Village in North Khorasan province, Iran

Mohammadabad-e Tabar Persian: محمدابادطبر
- Village
- Location within Iran
- Coordinates: 37°18′41″N 56°54′59″E
- Country: Iran
- Province: North Khorasan
- County: Jajrom
- District: Jolgeh Shuqan
- Rural District: Tabar

Population (2016)
  - Total: 275
- Time zone: UTC+3:30 (IRST)

Mohammadabad-e Tabar (Persian: محمدابادطبر) (Note: Also romanized as Moḩammadābād-e Ţabar; also known as Handava, Handavā and Moḩammadābād) is a village in Tabar Rural District of Jolgeh Shuqan District (Note: Formerly Dashtkuh District) in Jajrom County, North Khorasan province, Iran.

== Demographics ==
=== Population ===
At the time of the 2006 National Census, the village's population was 327 in 92 households. The following census in 2011 counted 329 people in 110 households. The 2016 census measured the population of the village as 275 people in 98 households.
