= Bam, Jajrom =

Village in North Khorasan province, Iran

Bam Persian: بام
- Village
- Location within Iran
- Coordinates: 37°20′46″N 56°50′15″E
- Country: Iran
- Province: North Khorasan
- County: Jajrom
- District: Jolgeh Shuqan
- Rural District: Shuqan

Population (2016)
  - Total: 187
- Time zone: UTC+3:30 (IRST)

Bam (Persian: بام) (Note: Also romanized as Bām) is a village in Shuqan Rural District (Note: Formerly Jolgeh Shuqan Rural District) of Jolgeh Shuqan District, (Note: Formerly Dashtkuh District) Jajrom County, North Khorasan province, Iran.

== Demographics ==
=== Population ===
At the time of the 2006 National Census, the village's population was 241 in 68 households. The following census in 2011 counted 233 people in 77 households. The 2016 census measured the population of the village as 187 people in 61 households.
