= Industrias Lácteas Asturianas =

Industrias Lácteas Asturianas S.A.
- Company type: Private
- Founded: 1960, founded by Francisco Rodríguez and Pablo Mayoral
- Headquarters: Anleo, Navia (Asturias)
- Products: dairy, dairy products, juices, beverages
- Brands: Reny Picot

Industrias Lácteas Asturianas (Ilas) is a company based in the Asturian parish of Anleo in the council of Navia, Spain.

== History ==
In 1960 Francisco Rodríguez, current president, and Pablo Mayoral put 150,000 pesetas each to found the company. They decide to install the first factory in the premises previously occupied by a ballroom. The town of Anleo is chosen as it is the only town in the area to have a telephone line.

The factory of seven workers begins to make Camembert cheese continuing its growth to the present day

== Products ==
- Milk : Milk and milk powder
- Cheese : Manufactures different types of Camembert, Gouda, Brie, Fontina, Manchego, Edam or cheese powder
- Butter : Creates butter, light butter, etc.
- Demineralized whey

== Subsidiaries ==
- Old Europe Cheese, Inc. Michigan, (USA): Production capacity of 100,000 liters per day and soft cheese and pressed cheese are treated there
- ILAS México, Chihuahua, (Mexico): Established in 1980, it has a production capacity of 300,000 liters of demineralized serum per day.
- Beijing Evergreen Dairy Products (China): Factory dedicated to the production of powdered milk, liquid milk, butter, milkshakes, liquid yogurts and ice cream.
- Le Chèvrefeuille (France): Capacity of 20,000 liters per day, and in it goat cheeses are made.
- Industrias queseras del Guadarrama SL (Madrid)
- Lacteas Castellano Leonesas SA Fresno de la Ribera (Zamora) Zamorano cheese, traditional cheese, burgos cheese and cream cheese.

It also has factories in Poland, Argentina and Portugal.
