= Kalateh-ye Hajj Ali Akbar =

Village in North Khorasan province, Iran

Kalateh-ye Hajj Ali Akbar Persian: كلاته حاج علي اكبر
- Village
- Location within Iran
- Coordinates: 37°18′00″N 56°45′00″E
- Country: Iran
- Province: North Khorasan
- County: Jajrom
- District: Jolgeh Shuqan
- Rural District: Tabar

Population (2016)
  - Total: 73
- Time zone: UTC+3:30 (IRST)

Kalateh-ye Hajj Ali Akbar (Persian: كلاته حاج رحمت) (Note: Also romanized as Kalāteh-ye Ḩājj ʿAlī Āḵbar; also known as Kalateh-ye Hajj Rahmat, also romanized as Kalāteh-ye Ḩājj Raḩmat) is a village in Tabar Rural District of Jolgeh Shuqan District (Note: Formerly Dashtkuh District) in Jajrom County, North Khorasan province, Iran.

== Demographics ==
=== Population ===
At the time of the 2006 National Census, the village's population was 70 in 23 households. The following census in 2011 counted 79 people in 24 households. The 2016 census measured the population of the village as 73 people in 23 households.
