= Morelos (disambiguation) =

Morelos is a state of Mexico.

Morelos may also refer to:

- Morelos, Chihuahua
- Morelos, Coahuila
- Morelos, Michoacán
- Morelos, State of Mexico
- Morelos, Tamaulipas
- Morelos, Zacatecas
- Morelos (satellite)
- Morelos Dam, a dam near Los Algodones, Baja California
- Estadio Morelos, a sports stadium in Morelia, Michoacán
- Morelos metro station, a station on the Mexico City Metro
- Morelos (Mexico City Metrobús), a BRT station in Mexico City
- Ciudad Morelos, Baja California
- Ecatepec de Morelos, State of Mexico
- Puerto Morelos, Quintana Roo

== People with the name ==
- Alfredo Morelos (born 1996), Colombian footballer
- José María Morelos (1765–1815), leader of the Mexican War of Independence
- Lisette Morelos (born 1978), Mexican actress

== See also ==
- Morelos Municipality (disambiguation)
- José María Morelos (disambiguation)
