= Morelos Municipality =

Morelos Municipality may refer to:

- Morelos Municipality, Coahuila
- Morelos Municipality, Chihuahua
- Morelos, Michoacán
- Morelos, State of Mexico
- Morelos, Zacatecas

== See also ==
- Morelos (disambiguation)
