= Ab Barik, North Khorasan =

Village in North Khorasan province, Iran

Ab Barik Persian: آب باریک
- Village
- Country: Iran
- Province: North Khorasan
- County: Jajrom
- District: Jolgeh Shuqan
- Rural District: Tabar

Population (2016)
  - Total: 0
- Time zone: UTC+3:30 (IRST)

Ab Barik (Persian: آب باریک) (Note: Also romanized as Āb Bārīḵ) is a village in Tabar Rural District of Jolgeh Shuqan District (Note: Formerly Dashtkuh District) in Jajrom County, North Khorasan province, Iran.

== Demographics ==
=== Population ===
At the time of the 2006 National Census, the village's population was 14 in 12 households. The village did not appear in the following census of 2011. The 2016 census measured the population of the village as zero.
