= Do Borjeh =

Village in North Khorasan province, Iran

Do Borjeh Persian: دوبرجه
- Village
- Location within Iran
- Coordinates: 37°19′59″N 56°49′53″E
- Country: Iran
- Province: North Khorasan
- County: Jajrom
- District: Jolgeh Shuqan
- Rural District: Shuqan

Population (2016)
  - Total: 384
- Time zone: UTC+3:30 (IRST)

Do Borjeh (Persian: دوبرجه) (Note: Also romanized as Do Borcheh) is a village in Shuqan Rural District (Note: Formerly Jolgeh Shuqan Rural District) of Jolgeh Shuqan District, (Note: Formerly Dashtkuh District) Jajrom County, North Khorasan province, Iran.

== Demographics ==
=== Population ===
At the time of the 2006 National Census, the village's population was 290 in 103 households. The following census in 2011 counted 249 people in 92 households. The 2016 census measured the population of the village as 384 people in 127 households.
