= Chapeh =

Village in North Khorasan province, Iran

Chapeh Persian: چپه
- Village
- Location within Iran
- Country: Iran
- Province: North Khorasan
- County: Jajrom
- District: Jolgeh Shuqan
- Rural District: Shuqan

Population (2016)
  - Total: 50
- Time zone: UTC+3:30 (IRST)

Chapeh (Persian: چپه) (Note: Also known as Cheyeh) is a village in Shuqan Rural District (Note: Formerly Jolgeh Shuqan Rural District) of Jolgeh Shuqan District, (Note: Formerly Dashtkuh District) Jajrom County, North Khorasan province, Iran.

== Demographics ==
=== Population ===
At the time of the 2006 National Census, the village's population was 46 in 16 households. The following census in 2011 counted 45 people in 16 households. The 2016 census measured the population of the village as 50 people in 20 households.
