= Kalateh-ye Shoqan =

Village in North Khorasan province, Iran

Kalateh-ye Shoqan Persian: كلاته شقان
- Village
- Location within Iran
- Coordinates: 37°20′13″N 56°48′00″E
- Country: Iran
- Province: North Khorasan
- County: Jajrom
- District: Jolgeh Shuqan
- Rural District: Shuqan

Population (2016)
  - Total: 200
- Time zone: UTC+3:30 (IRST)

Kalateh-ye Shoqan (Persian: كلاته شقان) (Note: Also romanized as Kalāteh-e Shoqān and Kalateh-ye Shoqan; also known as Kalāteh-ye Shoqānīhā) is a village in Shuqan Rural District (Note: Formerly Jolgeh Shuqan Rural District) of Jolgeh Shuqan District, (Note: Formerly Dashtkuh District) Jajrom County, North Khorasan province, Iran.

== Demographics ==
=== Population ===
At the time of the 2006 National Census, the village's population was 278 in 73 households. The following census in 2011 counted 248 people in 73 households. The 2016 census measured the population of the village as 200 people in 57 households.
