= Barazarlu =

Village in North Khorasan province, Iran

Barazarlu Persian: برزانلو
- Village
- Location within Iran
- Coordinates: 37°17′06″N 56°55′54″E
- Country: Iran
- Province: North Khorasan
- County: Jajrom
- District: Jolgeh Shuqan
- Rural District: Tabar

Population (2016)
  - Total: 255
- Time zone: UTC+3:30 (IRST)

Barazarlu (Persian: برزانلو) (Note: Also romanized as Barāzārlū; also known Barāzānlū) is a village in Tabar Rural District of Jolgeh Shuqan District (Note: Formerly Dashtkuh District) in Jajrom County, North Khorasan province, Iran.

== Demographics ==
=== Population ===
At the time of the 2006 National Census, the village's population was 316 in 82 households. The following census in 2011 counted 327 people in 96 households. The 2016 census measured the population of the village as 255 people in 83 households.
