= Andés =

- Parish
- Location within Spain
- Coordinates: 43.55°N 6.7°W
- Country: Spain
- Autonomous community: Asturias
- Province: Asturias
- Municipality: Navia
- Elevation: 71.3 m (234 ft)

Population (2008)
  - Total: 701
  - Density: 108.51/km^{2} (281.0/sq mi)
- Postal code: 33719

Andés is one of eight parishes (administrative divisions) in Navia, a municipality within the province and autonomous community of Asturias, in northern Spain. The parish of Andés is located on the western coast of the Principality of Asturias. Within the municipality of Navia it is located between the towns of Puerto de Vega and Navia.

== Population ==
The parish has a population of 701 inhabitants and an area of 6.46 km².

== Villages ==
- El Monte
- La Casanova
- L'Aspra
- Las Cortías
- La Guardia
- La Villalonga
- Téifaros (see below)
- Paderne
- La Cruz de Paderne
- La Colorada
- La Venta

== Téifaros ==
The village of Teifaros consists of only about a little over a dozen houses, including a few farms, where cows are raised for their milk. From Teifaros, the sea is visible, and the beaches of Fabal and Frejulfe are easily accessible by foot. The countryside is a mixture of crops such as potatoes and corn, fields of grass, and eucalyptus forests. The sea (Atlantic) reaches the land in either beaches or cliffs. The climate is humid and cool, meaning that the water is cold, even in summer. In summer it usually approaches 18 degrees celsius. Waves can be very powerful and dangerous. Beaches are usually made of black sand, because it comes from the black rock found in the area. Teifaros is located on a hilly and very green region.

== Geography ==
The parish of Andés is located on the coastal plateau and is wedged between the Veiga d'Arenas and Frejulfe beaches, locations where the Navia and Frejulfe rivers, respectively, empty into the sea. This plain is fragmented by several rivulets, which are born near the coast, resulting in small valleys with gentle slopes. At its mouth there are small and beautiful beaches with calm waters. Some of these rivulets flow into the sea forming jets of water several meters high due to the limited erosive capacity of the flow and steady decline of the waterfront. The Rubreves, La Bragada, La Rubias, Las Cortías, La Xertal and Cereizo rivulets run from south to north, are short-haul and flow into the sea. The Travesedo Brook runs from east to west, ending at the Poza de Veiga d'Arenas. The Paderne stream, which exceeds two kilometers, also runs east-west, empties into the river Navia and in its last section it is called the Olga Faquina River.

The coast has a cliff of considerable height where the flow of the rivulets is broken up forming small beaches such as Fabal, Cuedo, Las Rubias, La Bragada, Las Cascareiras, Las Barrosas and Pena Furada. The point of the coast which projects the further into the sea is El Castrillon. The remains of a Roman fort can still be found here.

== Sports ==
The city's main football team, Andés CF, reached the Tercera División in the 2014–15 season, but are now languishing in the Primera Regional de Asturias.
