= Televisa Law =

2006 Mexican law

The Televisa Law (Spanish: Ley Televisa) is the name given by the press to the Federal Law of Radio and Television (Spanish: Ley Federal de Radio y Televisión or LFRTV), a controversial law approved by the Congress of Mexico in 2006, shortly before the presidential election. This law concentrates on the deregulation of the digital spectrum to be assigned to the two national television networks in the country: Televisa and TV Azteca.

This law concedes to these two private television networks, free of monetary costs, the digital frequency spectrum, a public good belonging to the Government of Mexico.

== Background ==
One of the main promoters of the Televisa Law was Javier Orozco Gómez, General Attorney of the Grupo Televisa and later federal deputy representing the Partido Verde Ecologista de México and replacement senator for Irma Ortega Fajardo during the presentation of the law.

This law obtained the votes of the two parties with relative majority in both chambers of congress National Action Party (PAN) and Institutional Revolutionary Party (PRI). However, several senators from both parties objected to this law such as Javier Corral Jurado from the PAN and several others from the PRI. All of the deputies of the third major party in Mexico, the Party of the Democratic Revolution, the PRD, voted against this law, with Raymundo Cárdenas, senator for Zacatecas being one of the most vocal.

Another key supporter of this law was Diego Fernández de Cevallos, which has previously been criticized for his defense of private parties against the government while acting as a congressperson. Fernández de Cevallos directed harsh criticism towards Javier Corral who opposed the law due to his personal convictions against the generalized opinion of his party. Corral Jurado limited himself to say that he would keep striving for an integral, democratic reform for the electronic media.

The appearance of Jorge Arredondo Martínez, and engineer and president of the Comisión Federal de Telecomunicaciones declared after the incisive questioning by Emilio Gamboa Patrón, senator from the PRI, whether the law constituted an advance:

It does not assure the State's role of regulating the efficient use of the radio electric spectrum; it does not regulate spectrum and networks, under the same model, to allow the growing diversity of new converging services; it causes an inadequate administration of the spectrum that jeopardizes the convergence, because it makes difficult the introduction of new services, technologies and services

— Jorge Arredondo Martínez, during his appearance before the Senate of Mexico

== Claims of deficiencies of this law ==
- In May 2007, Sergio Salvador Aguirre Anguiano, minister of the Supreme Court of Justice of the Nation, explained that the article 28 of the Ley Federal de Radio y Televisión established that the granting of concessions violates the articles 1, 25, 27 and 28 of the Constitution of Mexico, and would encourage the concentration of broadcasting and telecommunications in the hands of the current licensees, Televisa and TV Azteca.
- Santiago Creel, the former Secretary of Interior during the administration of Vicente Fox, who supported the law declared in 2007, now as senator, that the approval occurred under pressure, that it was not negotiated, but imposed prior to the 2006 presidential election, when "the involved parties where immersed in an intense campaign that required media exposure", and that resulted in legislation "with many defects". Even the opposition has expressed admiration for Creel's courage in exposing the mistakes of the administration he was a member of.

== Supreme Court ==
In June 2007, the Supreme Court struck down several key clauses of the law. The right of the two companies to use the spectrum without paying for a license was struck down. The alternate spectrum dispersion method given (that of auction to highest bidder) was also revoked, returning the choice to the executive. As a secondary point, the automatic renewal of licenses after 20 years was also struck down by the Court. In line with the nature of the dispute, the Court held public deliberations and opened up witness and expert testimony in an unprecedented way.

== Other reactions ==
The Instituto Mexicano de la Radio (Grupo IMER) did not agree with this law because they claimed that if approved, all the radio stations of this group, as well as the television stations Once TV, Canal 22, Edusat and TV UNAM would be forced off the air. All the stations of the Grupo IMER then proceeded to broadcast the same song all day. Which was an allegory to the lack of plurality of the existing monopolies that always "plays the same song", and then a voice with no background music that reminded people that monopolies do not promote diversity and plurality of mass media. This protest against the new media law resulted in a successful action due to its public impact.
