= Polavieja =

Parish in Navia, Asturias, Spain

- Parish
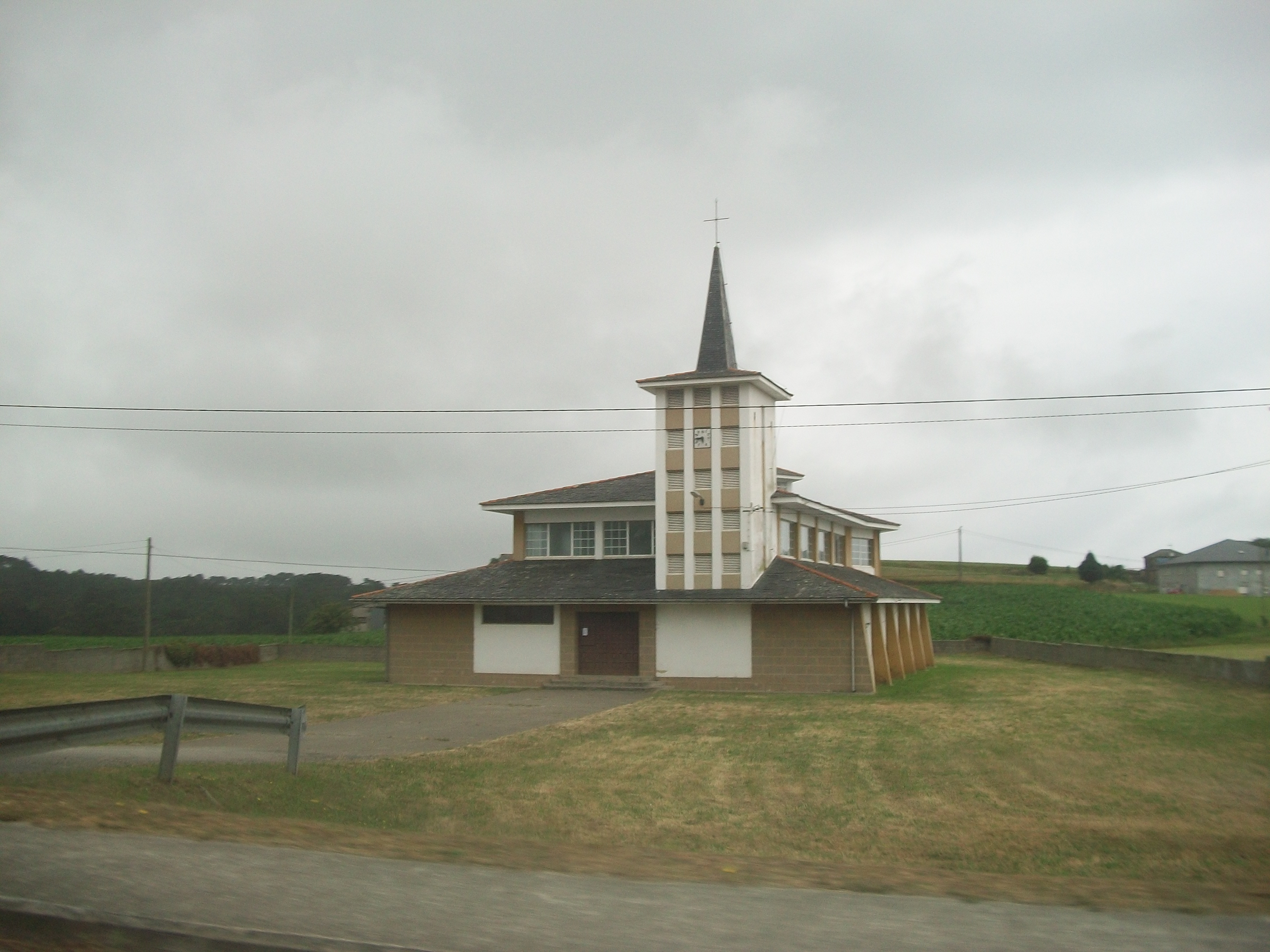
- Church of the parish

- Location within Spain
- Coordinates: 43.533333°N 6.65°W
- Country: Spain
- Autonomous community: Asturias
- Province: Asturias
- Municipality: Navia

Area
  - Total: 9.58 km^{2} (3.70 sq mi)

Population
  - Total: 247

Polavieja (Polavieya in Asturian language) is one of eight parishes in Navia, a municipality within the province and autonomous community of Asturias, in northern Spain.

== Villages ==
- Artedo (L'artedu)
- Caborno (Cabornu)
- El Bidulare (El Vidural)
- Carvajal (El Carbayal)
- Las Escas
- Polavieja (La Polavieya)
- San Miguel de los Eiros (Samigaldeiros)
- Villabona
