= Garmak, Jajrom =

Village in North Khorasan province, Iran

Garmak Persian: گرمك
- Village
- Location within Iran
- Coordinates: 37°17′42″N 56°56′21″E
- Country: Iran
- Province: North Khorasan
- County: Jajrom
- District: Jolgeh Shuqan
- Rural District: Tabar

Population (2016)
  - Total: 307
- Time zone: UTC+3:30 (IRST)

Garmak (Persian: گرمك) (Note: Also romanized as Garmok) is a village in Tabar Rural District of Jolgeh Shuqan District (Note: Formerly Dashtkuh District) in Jajrom County, North Khorasan province, Iran.

== Demographics ==
=== Population ===
At the time of the 2006 National Census, the village's population was 371 in 104 households. The following census in 2011 counted 390 people in 114 households. The 2016 census measured the population of the village as 307 people in 104 households.
