= Villanueva (Navia) =

Parish in Navia, Asturias, Spain

- Parish
- Location within Spain
- Coordinates: 43.516667°N 6.683333°W
- Country: Spain
- Autonomous community: Asturias
- Province: Asturias
- Municipality: Navia

Villanueva is one of eight parishes (administrative divisions) in Navia, a municipality within the province and autonomous community of Asturias in northern Spain.

== Villages ==
1. Armental
2. Balmeón (Valmeón)
3. Buenaavist
4. Cabanella
5. La Colorada
6. La Mabona (Llamabúa)
7. La Venta
8. Las Aceñas (Las Acenias)
9. Salcedo
10. Talarén
