= Piñera (Navia) =

Parish in Navia, Asturias, Spain

- Parish
- Location within Spain
- Coordinates: 43.55°N 6.666667°W
- Country: Spain
- Autonomous community: Asturias
- Province: Asturias
- Municipality: Navia

Piñera is one of eight parishes (administrative divisions) in Navia, a municipality within the province and autonomous community of Asturias, in northern Spain.

== Villages ==
- Busmargalí (Busmargalín)
- El Seijo (El Seixo)
- Freal
- Frejulfe (Frexulfe)
- Fuentes (Fontes)
- Piñera
- Somorto (El Somourtu)
- Villaoril (Villauril)
