= Villapedre =

Parish in Navia, Asturias, Spain

- Parish
- Villapedre; Viḷḷapedre
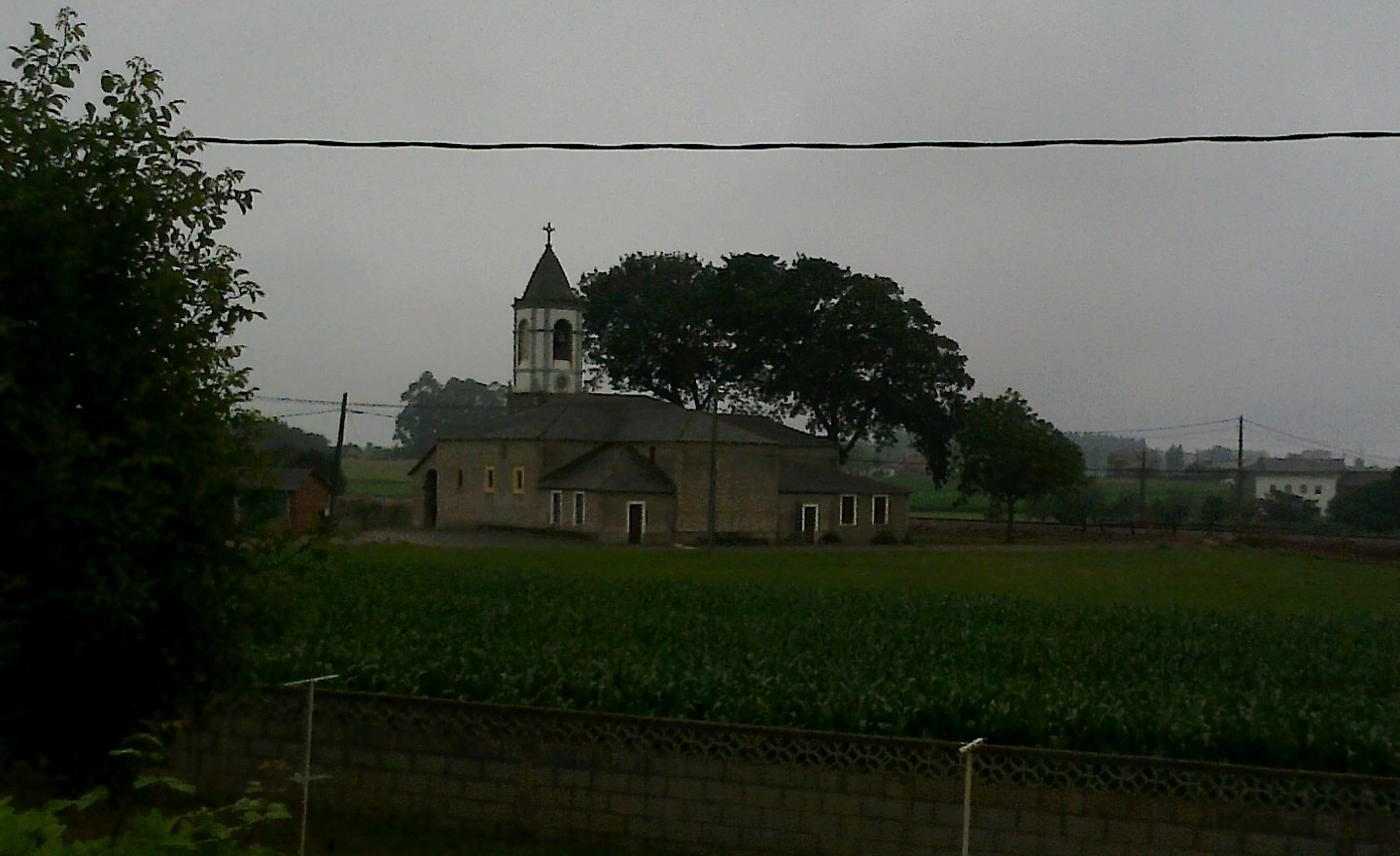
- Church of Villapedre

- Location within Spain
- Coordinates: 43.533333°N 6.65°W
- Country: Spain
- Autonomous community: Asturias
- Municipality: Navia

Area
  - Total: 6.45 km^{2} (2.49 sq mi)
- Elevation: 68 m (223 ft)

Population (2025)
  - Total: 527
- Postal code: 33793

Villapedre or Viḷḷapedre (Asturian and Spanish: [biʎa'pedre]) is one of eight parishes (administrative divisions) in Navia, a municipality within the province and autonomous community of Asturias, in northern Spain. It is located 5.6 km away from the city of Navia. Its postal code is 33793. The town's biggest festival occurs on the Feast of Saint James. The Northern Way of the Camino de Santiago goes through the town.

Solar eclipse of August 12, 2026 in Villapedre

== Location and Geography ==
It has a surface area of 6.45 km^{2}. The Romallande Creek runs through the town. It has a total population of 527 people.

Highway N-634 and the Ferrol to Gijón Narrow Guage Railway go through the town.

== Villages ==
- Barzana
- Cabrafigal
- El Bao
- El Barbeitín
- El Cueto
- La Peña
- Pedrosa
- Tox
- Villainclán
- Villaiz
- Villar
