= Javier Orozco Gómez =

Mexican politician

- Born: 18 November 1964 (age 61); Benito Juárez, D.F., Mexico
- Occupations: Deputy and Senator
- Political party: PVEM

Javier Orozco Gómez (born 18 November 1964) is a Mexican politician affiliated with the PVEM. As of 2013 he served as Deputy of both the LIX and LXII Legislatures of the Mexican Congress representing the State of Mexico. He also served as Senator during the LX and LXI Legislatures. He was one of the promoters of the infamous Televisa Law.
