= José María Morelos (disambiguation) =

José María Teclo Morelos Pérez y Pavón (1765–1815) was a Mexican Catholic priest, statesman and military leader who led the Mexican War of Independence movement.

Places named after him include:

- General José María Morelos y Pavón, Aguascalientes
- José María Morelos Municipality, Quintana Roo
  - José María Morelos, Quintana Roo, the municipal seat
- Jose Maria Morelos Buenavista, Tlaxcala
- Morelos (disambiguation)

== See also ==
- Equestrian statue of José María Morelos (disambiguation)
