= Naviar =

Village in North Khorasan province, Iran

Naviar Persian: ناويار
- Village
- Location within Iran
- Coordinates: 37°21′51″N 56°41′29″E
- Country: Iran
- Province: North Khorasan
- County: Jajrom
- District: Jolgeh Shuqan
- Rural District: Shuqan

Population (2016)
  - Total: 125
- Time zone: UTC+3:30 (IRST)

Naviar (Persian: ناويار) (Note: Also romanized as Nāvīār; also known as Nāvayān, Nāvīā, and Nāvīyā (ناويا)) is a village in Shuqan Rural District (Note: Formerly Jolgeh Shuqan Rural District) of Jolgeh Shuqan District, (Note: Formerly Dashtkuh District) Jajrom County, North Khorasan province, Iran.

== Demographics ==
=== Population ===
At the time of the 2006 National Census, the village's population was 180 in 54 households. The following census in 2011 counted 168 people in 58 households. The 2016 census measured the population of the village as 125 people in 50 households.
