= Posht-e Bam, North Khorasan =

Village in North Khorasan province, Iran

Posht-e Bam Persian: پشت بام
- Village
- Location within Iran
- Coordinates: 37°19′04″N 56°50′27″E
- Country: Iran
- Province: North Khorasan
- County: Jajrom
- District: Jolgeh Shuqan
- Rural District: Shuqan

Population (2016)
  - Total: 339
- Time zone: UTC+3:30 (IRST)

Posht-e Bam (Persian: پشت بام) (Note: Also romanized as Posht-e Bām) is a village in Shuqan Rural District (Note: Formerly Jolgeh Shuqan Rural District) of Jolgeh Shuqan District, (Note: Formerly Dashtkuh District) Jajrom County, North Khorasan province, Iran.

== Demographics ==
=== Population ===
At the time of the 2006 National Census, the village's population was 313 in 95 households. The following census in 2011 counted 327 people in 106 households. The 2016 census measured the population of the village as 339 people in 112 households.
