= Anleo =

- Parish
- Location within Spain
- Coordinates: 43.516667°N 6.683333°W
- Country: Spain
- Autonomous community: Asturias
- Province: Asturias
- Municipality: Navia

Anleo is one of eight parishes (administrative divisions) in Navia, a municipality within the province and autonomous community of Asturias, in northern Spain.

The village of Anleo is located at an altitude of 130 m and is 5.8 km from the town of Navia, capital of the council.

The architectural work that governs this small town is the palace of Anleo, which is currently undergoing rehabilitation. It has an L shape. Its origin dates back to the 13th century and it gave shelter to Saint Francis of Assisi on his pilgrimage to Santiago de Compostela . It was burned in a fire in 1520; it was rebuilt and rebuilt in 1704. Today you can see the monumental character it had, with its square towers framing the facade. Three towers of different heights: two of them crenellated, with pinnacles topped in balls and drainage gargoyles at the corners; a third, square —which had a 4-sided slate roof— with loopholes on the ground floor, a semicircular arched door and lintel windows, one of them geminated (split, divided). Main facade composed of a longitudinal body flanked by two square towers. The floors are separated by imposts (strips) of stonework. Highlighted plinth in the lower area. Door with molded frame in the center.

Anleo is the headquarters of Reny Picot, an important dairy products company that occupies more space than the town itself.

== Villages ==
- Anleo (Anlleo)
- Braña del Río (La Braña'l Ríu)
- Cacabellos
- Las Murias
- Piquera (Piqueira)
- Sante

=== Populations ===
According to the gazetteer of 2012, the parish comprises the following population entities:

Topónimo (id. tradicional)	Categoría histórica	Población empadronada (2012)	Viviendas (2001)	Altitud	Distancia a la capital (m)
Anleo (Anlleo)	aldea	325 hab.	113	130 m	5,8 km
Braña del Río (La Braña'l Ríu)	aldea	13 hab.	7	360 m	8,4 km
Cacabellos	aldea	54 hab.	24	60 m	5,0 km
Las Murias	casería	25 hab.	7	160 m	8,0 km
Piquera (Piqueira)	casería	21 hab.	9	50 m	3,2 km
Sante	lugar	116 hab.	43	60 m	4,0 km
