= César Jáuregui Moreno =

Mexican politician (born 1966)

Jáuregui Moreno in 2026

César Gustavo Jáuregui Moreno (Note: In this Mexican name, the surname is Jáuregui and the second or maternal family name is Moreno.) (born 26 June 1966) is a Mexican politician from the National Action Party (PAN). Born in Baja California, he has lived in Chihuahua since adolescence and has held numerous political positions in that state.

His most recent position was as attorney general of Chihuahua, to which he was appointed in 2023. He resigned on 27 April 2026 following accusations of his involvement in the 2026 Chihuahua CIA scandal. He is currently incarcerated, facing state charges and a federal prosecution for the crime of treason.

== Early life and political career ==
César Jáuregui Moreno was born on 26 June 1966 in Mexicali, Baja California, where he completed his basic education. For high school, however, he had relocated to Ciudad Juárez, Chihuahua, and he later completed a law degree at the Autonomous University of Chihuahua in 1990. By that time he was already a member of the PAN, which he had joined in 1983.

He held various positions during the 1990s, including director of legislative research in the Congress of Chihuahua and assistant director of internal affairs in the state government. He was also director of government and commerce in the Juárez municipal government and sat on the municipal council. In 2004 he was elected to a seat in the Congress of Chihuahua, where he coordinated the PAN bloc during the 2004–2007 legislative session. He stood for municipal president of Juárez in 2010 but lost to Héctor Murguía Lardizábal of the Institutional Revolutionary Party (PRI). During the 2010s he served in the municipal governments of Delicias and Chihuahua and, from 2014 to 2016, he served a second term in the Congress of Chihuahua when he was again the PAN's congressional coordinator. He also served in various roles within the PAN's party apparatus in Chihuahua.

From 2016 to 2021 he was the secretary of the municipal government during Maru Campos's two terms as municipal president of Chihuahua, whose electoral campaigns he also coordinated. He also coordinated Campos's successful bid for the governorship of Chihuahua in 2021 and was appointed general secretary of the state government in her 2021–2027 administration.

== Attorney general of Chihuahua ==
Following a cabinet reshuffle that saw Roberto Fierro Duarte removed from the position, Jáuregui Moreno was sworn in as attorney general of Chihuahua on 25 January 2026.
