= Navia (parish) =

Parish in Navia, Asturias, Spain

- Parish
- Location within Spain
- Coordinates: 43°31′N 6°43′W
- Country: Spain
- Autonomous community: Asturias
- Province: Asturias
- Municipality: Navia

Navia is one of eight parishes (administrative divisions) in Navia, a municipality within the province and autonomous community of Asturias, in northern Spain.
