= 1996–97 Atlante F.C. season =

Atlante
1996–97 season
- Manager: Miguel Mejía Barón
- Stadium: Estadio Azteca
- Invierno: 1st Playoffs: Quarterfinals
- Verano: 5th Playoffs: Quarterfinals
- Copa México: Group stage
- Top goalscorer: League: Luís Roberto Alves (17 goals); All: Luís Roberto Alves (18 goals)
- Biggest win: Atlante 6–0 Celaya (18 November 1996)
- Biggest defeat: Toros Neza 4–0 Atlante (4 December 1996)
Home colours
- All statistics correct as of 31 January 2019.

The 1996–97 Atlante F.C. season was the 5th season since the team's last promotion to Primera División. Atlante competed in Primera División and Copa México

== Coaching staff ==
Position	Name
Head coach	(Mexico) Miguel Mejía Barón
Assistant coaches	(Mexico) Guillermo Vázquez Mejía
Assistant coaches	(Mexico) Ricardo Aguirre
Fitness coach	(Mexico) Manuel Benítez
Doctor	(Mexico) Alfonso Díaz

== Players ==
=== Squad information ===
No.	Pos.	Nat.	Name	Date of birth (age)	Signed in	Previous club
Goalkeepers
1	GK	(Mexico)	Ángel Maldonado	8 September 1973 (aged 22)		
9	GK	(Mexico)	Jorge Campos	15 October 1966 (aged 29)	1995	(Mexico) UNAM
12	GK	(Mexico)	Félix Fernández	11 January 1967 (aged 29)	1987	(Mexico) Youth system
Defenders
2	DF	(Mexico)	Juan Hernández	8 March 1965 (aged 31)	1996	(Mexico) América
3	DF	(Mexico)	Juan de Dios Ramírez (VC)	8 March 1969 (aged 27)	1996	(Mexico) Toros Neza
4	DF	(Mexico)	Ignacio Ambríz (2nd VC)	7 February 1965 (aged 31)	1996	(Mexico) Necaxa
5	DF	(Romania)	Miodrag Belodedici	20 May 1964 (aged 32)	1996	(Spain) Villarreal
15	DF	(Mexico)	Eduardo Medina	13 September 1972 (aged 23)	1995	(Mexico) UNAM
16	DF	(Mexico)	José Luis Navarrete	12 January 1973 (aged 23)	1992	
24	DF	(Mexico)	José Guadalupe Cruz	22 November 1967 (aged 28)	1988	
Midfielders
8	MF	(Brazil)	José Damasceno	13 July 1970 (aged 26)	1996	(Mexico) Celaya
10	MF	(Serbia and Montenegro)	Vlada Stošić	31 January 1965 (aged 31)	1997 (Winter)	(Spain) Betis
13	MF	(Mexico)	Víctor Saavedra	17 July 1973 (aged 23)	1995	
14	MF	(Mexico)	Ricardo Carbajal	17 October 1968 (aged 27)	1995	(Mexico) Cruz Azul
21	MF	(Mexico)	Gastón Obledo	6 February 1966 (aged 30)	1993	(Mexico) UAT
21	MF	(Mexico)	Javier Flores	10 July 1973 (aged 23)	1996	
25	MF	(Mexico)	Manuel Sol	31 August 1973 (aged 22)	1996	(Mexico) Necaxa
29	MF	(Mexico)	Mario García	1 June 1967 (aged 29)	1989	
Forwards
6	FW	(Peru)	Germán Carty	16 July 1968 (aged 28)	1996	(Peru) Sport Boys
7	FW	(Mexico)	Alfonso Malibrán	20 October 1973 (aged 22)		
11	FW	(Argentina)	Martín Ubaldi	11 November 1969 (aged 26)	1996	(Mexico) UANL
17	FW	(Mexico)	Luís Roberto Alves (Captain)	23 May 1967 (aged 29)	1996	(Mexico) América
20	FW	(Mexico)	Mario Jáuregui	1 August 1970 (aged 26)	1995	(Mexico) Monterrey

Players and squad numbers last updated on 31 January 2019.
Note: Flags indicate national team as has been defined under FIFA eligibility rules. Players may hold more than one non-FIFA nationality.

== Competitions ==
=== Overview ===
Competition	First match	Last match	Starting round	Final position	Record							
Competition	First match	Last match	Starting round	Final position	Pld	W	D	L	GF	GA	GD	Win %
Torneo Invierno	11 August 1996	7 December 1996	Matchday 1	1st	19	12	2	5	32	20	+12	63.16
Torneo Verano	11 January 1997	18 May 1997	Matchday 1	Runners-up	19	9	4	6	26	22	+4	47.37
Copa México	30 June 1996	28 July 1996	Group stage	Group stage	8	4	0	4	11	12	−1	50.00
Total					46	25	6	15	69	54	+15	54.35

Source: RSSSF.com

=== Torneo Invierno ===
==== League table ====
Pos	Team	Pld	W	D	L	GF	GA	GD	Pts	Qualification or relegation
1	Atlante	17	12	2	3	30	11	+19	38	Advance to Liguilla (Playoffs)
2	Santos Laguna (C)	17	10	4	3	21	15	+6	34	Advance to Liguilla (Playoffs)
3	Guadalajara	17	9	4	4	33	19	+14	31	Advance to Liguilla (Playoffs)
4	Puebla	17	9	4	4	32	22	+10	31	Advance to Liguilla (Playoffs)
5	Toluca	17	9	3	5	26	15	+11	30	Advance to Liguilla (Playoffs)

Source: Liga MX
Rules for classification: 1) Points; 2) Goal difference; 3) Number of goals scored; 4) Head-to-head results between tied teams; 5) Number of goals scored away; 6) Highest relegation coefficient; 7) Fair Play points
(C) Champions

==== Results summary ====
Overall								Home						Away					
Pld	W	D	L	GF	GA	GD	Pts	W	D	L	GF	GA	GD	W	D	L	GF	GA	GD
17	12	2	3	30	11	+19	38	6	1	1	17	3	+14	6	1	2	13	8	+5

Source: Liga MX

=== Torneo Verano ===
==== League table ====
Pos	Team	Pld	W	D	L	GF	GA	GD	Pts	Qualification or relegation
3	Toros Neza	17	9	3	5	40	32	+8	30	Advance to Liguilla (Playoffs)
4	Necaxa	17	8	4	5	33	20	+13	28	Advance to Liguilla (Playoffs)
5	Atlante	17	8	4	5	23	19	+4	28	Advance to Liguilla (Playoffs)
6	UNAM	17	8	3	6	25	26	−1	27	Advance to Liguilla (Playoffs)
7	Santos Laguna	17	8	2	7	27	28	−1	26	Advance to Liguilla (Playoffs)

Source: Liga MX
Rules for classification: 1) Points; 2) Goal difference; 3) Number of goals scored; 4) Head-to-head results between tied teams; 5) Number of goals scored away; 6) Highest relegation coefficient; 7) Fair Play points

==== Results summary ====
Overall								Home						Away					
Pld	W	D	L	GF	GA	GD	Pts	W	D	L	GF	GA	GD	W	D	L	GF	GA	GD
17	8	4	5	23	19	+4	28	5	1	3	14	10	+4	3	3	2	9	9	0

Source: Liga MX

== Statistics ==
=== Goals ===
Rank	Player	Position	Invierno	Verano	Copa México	Total
1	(Mexico) Luís Roberto Alves	FW	10	7	1	18
2	(Mexico) Mario Jáuregui	FW	7	1	1	9
3	(Mexico) Ricardo Carbajal	MF	4	4	0	8
4	(Brazil) José Damasceno	MF	4	2	0	6
4	(Mexico) Juan Hernández	DF	1	2	3	6
6	(Argentina) Martín Ubaldi	FW	1	2	2	5
7	(Peru) Germán Carty	FW	0	4	0	4
8	(Mexico) Alfonso Malibrán	FW	2	1	0	3
9	(Mexico) Ignacio Ambríz	DF	1	1	0	2
9	(Romania) Miodrag Belodedici	DF	1	0	1	2
9	(Mexico) Javier Flores	MF	1	0	1	2
9	(Serbia and Montenegro) Vlada Stošić	MF	0	2	0	2
13	(Mexico) Víctor Saavedra	MF	0	0	1	1
13	(Mexico) Mario García	MF	0	0	1	1
Total			32	26	11	69

=== Clean sheets ===
Rank	Name	Invierno	Verano	Total
1	(Mexico) Jorge Campos	3	5	8
2	(Mexico) Félix Fernández	3	0	3
Total		6	5	11
