= Posht Bam, Kohgiluyeh and Boyer-Ahmad =

Posht Bam پشت بام
- Village
- Location within Iran
- Coordinates: 30°47′41″N 50°50′17″E
- Country: Iran
- Province: Kohgiluyeh and Boyer-Ahmad
- County: Charam
- Bakhsh: Sarfaryab
- Rural District: Sarfaryab

Population (2006)
  - Total: 53
- Time zone: UTC+3:30 (IRST)
  - Summer (DST): UTC+4:30 (IRDT)

Posht Bam (Persian: پشت بام, also Romanized as Posht Bām) is a village in Sarfaryab Rural District, Sarfaryab District, Charam County, Kohgiluyeh and Boyer-Ahmad Province, Iran. At the 2006 census, its population was 53, in 10 families.
