= Maru Campos =

Mexican politician and lawyer (born 1975)

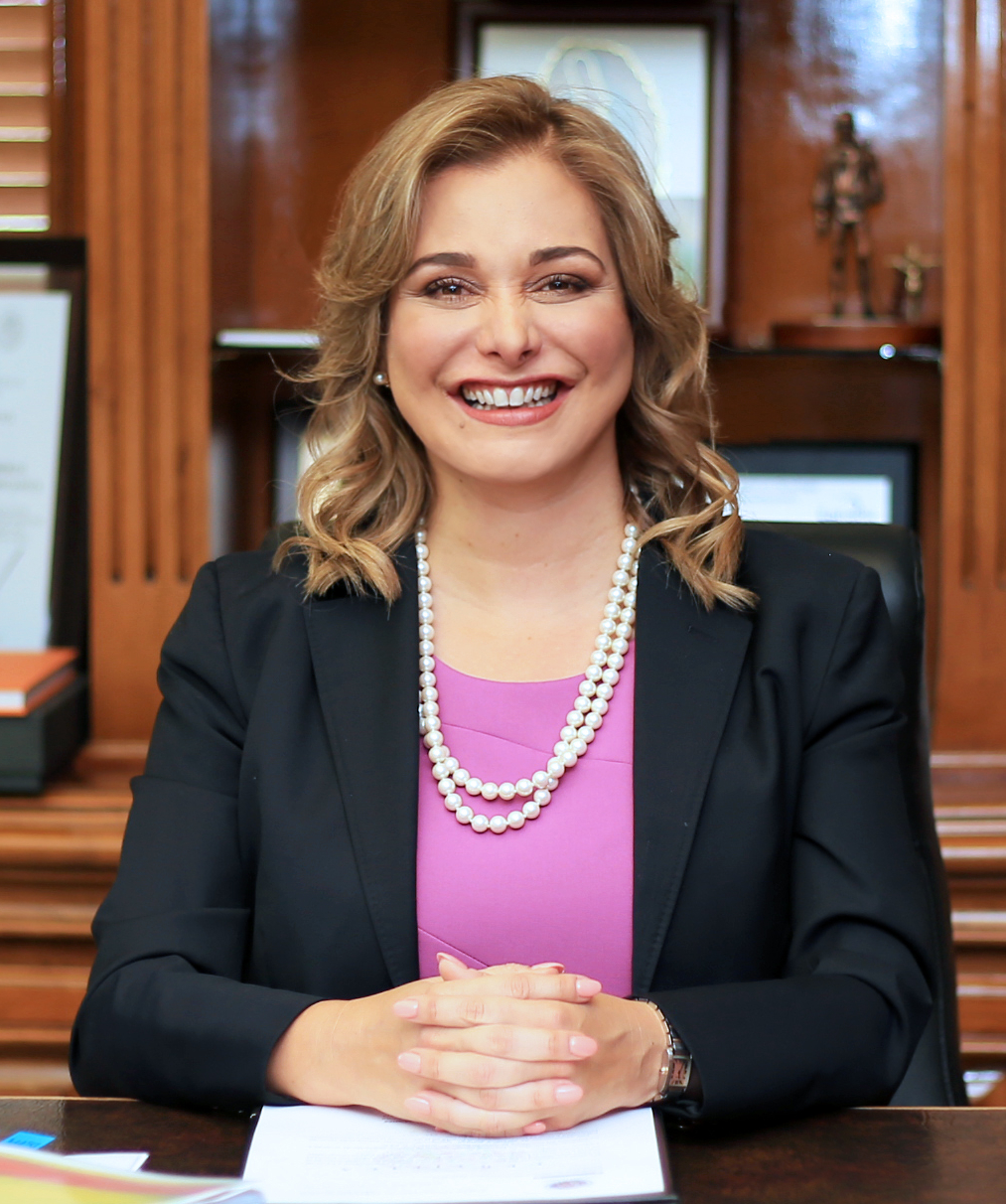
- Official portrait, 2018

Governor of Chihuahua
- Incumbent
- Assumed office 8 September 2021
- Preceded by: Javier Corral

Municipal president of Chihuahua
- In office 8 August 2018 – 2 January 2021
- Preceded by: Marco Antonio Bonilla Mendoza
- Succeeded by: María Angélica Granados Trespalacios
- In office 10 October 2016 – 17 May 2018
- Preceded by: Javier Garfio Pacheco
- Succeeded by: Marco Antonio Bonilla Mendoza

Deputy of the Mexican Congress from Chihuahua
- In office 1 September 2006 – 31 August 2009

Personal details
- Born: María Eugenia Campos Galván; 11 September 1975 (age 51) Chihuahua City, Chihuahua, Mexico
- Party: National Action Party
- Education: Monterrey Institute of Technology and Higher Education; Georgetown University
- Occupation: Politician, lawyer
- Website: http://www.marucampos.mx/

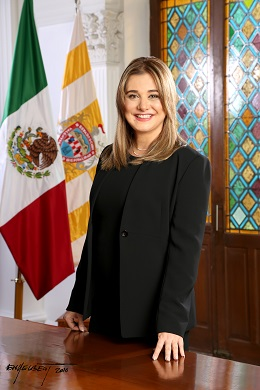
Campos in 2016

María Eugenia Campos Galván (born 11 September 1975), commonly known as Maru Campos, is a Mexican politician and lawyer affiliated with the National Action Party (PAN). She has served as Governor of the State of Chihuahua since 2021, becoming the first woman to hold the position. Before that, she was a federal deputy in the LX Legislature of the Mexican Congress from 2013 to 2016, and later served as mayor of Chihuahua City from 2016 to 2021, elected the first female and the first person to be democratically re-elected for a second term.

== Personal life ==
María Eugenia Campos Galván was born on 11 September 1975 in Chihuahua City. She is the daughter of engineer Manuel Campos Cepeda and politician María Eugenia Galván Antillón, who served as a federal deputy in Mexico's LVIII Legislature and later as Secretary of Social Development for the state of Chihuahua. The family also included her younger brother, Guillermo Federico, a public official and politician who died in a car accident in Mexico City on 14 November 2011, shortly after attending the funeral of Francisco Blake Mora.

She spent her childhood in her hometown, where she completed her primary and secondary education at the Instituto La Salle. From a young age, she took part in missionary work in the Sierra Tarahumara, particularly in the municipalities of Bocoyna and Batopilas, an experience that deeply shaped her social awareness and commitment to community service.

In August 1994, she enrolled at the Monterrey Institute of Technology and Higher Education, Chihuahua campus, where she pursued a law degree, graduating in December 1999. During her undergraduate studies, she practiced civil law at a local law firm and participated in an academic exchange at Harvard Kennedy School.

She later earned a master's degree in Latin American Studies and Government from Georgetown University's Walsh School of Foreign Service. Additionally, she obtained a master's degree in Public Administration and Public Policy from ITESM's Graduate School of Public Administration and Public Policy. Campos Galván has also completed several specialized programs and diplomas in governance, democratic transitions, political theory, and political communication through institutions such as Ibero-American University, the Christian Democrat Organization of America, Georgetown University, and the National Democratic Institute.

== Political career ==
=== Early political involvement ===
At the age of 22, María Eugenia Campos Galván joined the National Action Party (PAN). Since 1998, she has served as a state councilor for her party, and since 2007, as a national councilor. From 1997 to 1999, she was State Secretary of Acción Juvenil, the youth wing of PAN in Chihuahua.

In 2000, she entered public service through the Congress of Chihuahua, working as an advisor to PAN's parliamentary group. She later moved to Mexico City, where she served as an advisor to the Energy Committee in the Chamber of Deputies, and subsequently as private secretary and technical secretary to the General Directorate of Political Development in the Secretariat of the Interior.

From 2004 to 2006, she was the National Executive Committee's representative in Washington, D.C. During PAN's internal race to choose its presidential candidate for the 2006 federal elections, she was National Coordinator for Women in the campaign of pre-candidate Santiago Creel.

=== Federal government official (2009–2012) ===
In December 2009, Campos Galván was appointed State Delegate of Liconsa, a state-owned company under the social development sector dedicated to combating food poverty. In this role, she reorganized administrative processes and internal controls for the fresh milk purchasing program in the state. She also reported a recurring case of fund misappropriation involving Industrias Lácteas de Chihuahua—a subsidiary of the Spanish company Industrias Lácteas Asturianas. In May 2011, after receiving threats, she resigned from her post for personal security reasons.

She later served as an advisor at the General Directorate of the Comisión Federal de Electricidad, where she coordinated the company's social outreach efforts and institutional relations with federal entities and the Mexican Congress.

In the 2012 federal elections, she ran as PAN's candidate for federal deputy in Electoral District 8, which at the time covered the northern and eastern areas of Chihuahua City. She obtained 31.48% of the vote, coming within fewer than eight thousand votes of the winning Institutional Revolutionary Party candidate, Pedro Ignacio Domínguez Zepeda.

== Congresswoman ==
=== Federal deputy (2006–2009) ===
In the 2006 federal elections, María Eugenia Campos Galván was elected as a federal deputy for the National Action Party through proportional representation. She took office on September 1 of that year as a member of the LX Legislature of the Mexican Congress.

She served as secretary of the Foreign Affairs Committee and as a member of the committees on the Federal District, Public Administration, and the Special Committee for State Reform.

During her term, she introduced multiple legislative initiatives and proposals. Among them were: the creation of the Unified Registry of Secured Transactions, which took effect in August 2009; a constitutional amendment requiring congressional approval for the President of the Republic to travel abroad for up to seven days; a reform strengthening the powers of the Bank of Mexico to promote economic growth and job creation; and the design and implementation of comprehensive strategies to address challenges along the northern border. She also secured federal support for the construction of a children's hospital in Chihuahua City.

Campos Galván also backed several reforms that were approved and later published in the Official Journal of the Federation, including: strengthening the oversight powers of the Superior Auditor of the Federation; elevating the right to public information to constitutional status; reducing both public and private funding for political parties; increasing penalties for organized crime; enacting the Law for the Promotion and Development of Biofuels; promoting women's participation in rural economic development; advancing training and formal recognition for Indigenous midwives; and disqualifying public officials from service if they failed to submit their asset declarations without justified cause.

=== Local deputy (2013–2016) ===
In the 2013 state elections, she ran as the PAN candidate for local deputy in Chihuahua's 17th electoral district, which covers the eastern part of the capital. She won with 47.84% of the vote, finishing more than six points ahead of the runner-up.

She took office on October 1 of that year as a member of the LXIV Legislature of the Congress of the State of Chihuahua. She served as secretary of the Committees on Programming, Budget, and Public Finance, and on Oversight (Auditing). She was also a member of the First Committee on Governance and Constitutional Affairs, as well as the committees on Energy; Economy; the Special Committee to review executive-branch performance reports; the Special Committee to review government reports; and the working group on reform of the state legislature. In addition, she served as deputy floor leader of the PAN caucus.

Her legislative work included initiatives to enact a State Regulatory Improvement and Austerity Law; a State Law on Addiction Prevention; a State Scholarships and Loans Law; and the law establishing the "School for Mothers, Fathers, and Guardians" program. She also introduced proposals incorporated into the new State Civil Pensions Law; requested audits of the Coordinadora de Transporte Colectivo due to irregularities detected in the Vivebús system; pressed for enforcement of the 50% fare discount on urban and semi-urban transit; called for publication of the regulations to the Animal Welfare Law; urged an expansion of the fuel price equalization program to lower gasoline prices; and repeatedly opposed debt increases requested by the state government.

In 2016, she requested leave from her post to seek the PAN nomination for mayor of her hometown.

== Mayor of Chihuahua City (2016–2021) ==
=== 2016 election ===
After securing a leave of absence from her position as a local deputy, she registered on March 3, 2016, as a contender for the mayoralty of Chihuahua City, receiving her official certificate as a pre-candidate two days later.

From April 28 to June 1 of that year, she conducted her campaign as the PAN candidate. In the election, she received a total of 154,229 votes—44.33% of all ballots cast. This not only returned the municipal government to her party but also set a record for the largest winning margin in the city's history, surpassing her closest rival by 63,312 votes, an 18.2% difference.

Days after the election, she received her official certificate as mayor-elect and was welcomed by then-mayor Javier Garfio Pacheco to begin the transition process.

=== First term (2016–2018) ===
On October 10, 2016, she was sworn in as the first woman to serve as mayor of Chihuahua City, for the 2016–2018 term. Campos Galván launched Escudo Chihuahua ("Chihuahua Shield"), a security platform that included vehicle inspection arches and license plate–reading cameras at the city's geographic limits, as well as the installation of over 500 surveillance cameras—up from just six functioning units when she took office. She equipped municipal patrol cars with tablets and provided body cameras to police officers. A new municipal intelligence, monitoring, and operations center was built, linked to more than 3,000 privately owned cameras, along with a new police station in the Riberas del Sacramento neighborhood.

She repaired the city's police helicopter, unused for years, and acquired the first municipal tactical vehicle for high-risk interventions. She established the Pink Squad to address and prevent domestic violence and introduced a panic button system for businesses and mobile phones through the city's "Marca el Cambio" ("Make the Change") app. With support from the United States Agency for International Development, she launched Mi Colonia es Mi Casa ("My Neighborhood Is My Home"), a social intervention and public space improvement program. During her first term, overall crime rates dropped by 28%, and homicides fell by 49%. She implemented an austerity plan that saved approximately 100 million pesos and increased municipal revenue without raising property taxes. As a result, Chihuahua improved its credit rating to BBB+ with Fitch Ratings and AA+ with HR Ratings.

Municipal regulations were reformed so that city council sessions and procurement processes were broadcast live on social media. The municipal gazette began digital publication, and she created an internal control office. She introduced the triple helix governance model—linking government, academia, and industry—and improved the city's transparency rating to 94 out of 100 from the Chihuahua State Transparency Institute, doubling the national score assigned by Ciudadanos por Municipios Transparentes (Citizens for Transparent Municipalities). Chihuahua became one of only three municipalities in Mexico to comply fully with the new governmental accounting law. Campos Galván led an official ceremony to issue an institutional apology for the 2013 Aeroshow tragedy, provided compensation to victims and their families, and built a memorial to honor them. She reactivated the Regional Economic Development Council after a five-year hiatus, created a new downtown one-stop office for rapid business registration, and launched a municipal entrepreneurship fund. She inaugurated the Chihuahua Living Lab to promote civic innovation and invested in key industrial clusters, including automotive, aerospace, metalworking, medical tourism, and winemaking. Through the "Chihuahua First" program, local companies joined global supply chains, and she signed an agreement with the European Union to implement carbon-emission–reduction technologies. Major works included electrification in nine neighborhoods—bringing power to 5,000 families—construction of the city's southern wastewater collector, installation of drainage for over 8,000 homes, and development of Vistas Cerro Grande, the largest linear park in the city. She oversaw the construction of key road projects, including the La Juventud–La Cantera interchange, expansion of Aldama Highway to Sacramento Avenue, the Homero–Tecnológico overpass, and additional lanes on Cantera Avenue and the Pan-American Highway.

Other projects included 74 new bus stops, hydraulic concrete paving of the Sauz–Nuevo Delicias road and nearly 300 streets, renovation of the municipal equine therapy center, restoration of a 19th-century house into a museum, and the opening of medical clinics in Ejido Ocampo and Riberas del Sacramento.

She inaugurated the city center's sculpture corridor—featuring works by artists such as José Luis Cuevas—restored landmarks like the Cueva de las Monas and the Grutas del Nombre de Dios, and established the first municipal arts and creators fund in Mexico.

Her Mayor in Your Neighborhood program brought her directly to public spaces to meet citizens, and she introduced transportation scholarships for students, the "My Support, My Well-being" card benefiting over 90,000 women, and a senior food assistance program that doubled its beneficiaries compared to the previous administration. Under her leadership, Chihuahua received the Silver Broom award as one of the cleanest cities in Latin America, the Alcaldes de México award for public safety advances, and the Pioneer Award from the Odessa, Texas, Hispanic Chamber of Commerce.

On May 17, 2018, she requested a leave of absence from the city council to seek re-election, with Marco Bonilla Mendoza stepping in as interim mayor.

=== 2018 election ===
On January 28, 2018, she registered as a pre-candidate for re-election and launched her campaign in late May as the nominee of the "Por Chihuahua al Frente" coalition, comprising National Action Party and the Citizens' Movement.

She secured 203,613 votes—51.37% of the total—nearly 100,000 more than the runner-up and almost 50,000 more than in her first mayoral race, breaking her own record. She thus became the first person to be democratically re-elected as Mayor of Chihuahua.

After the election, she resumed office on August 8, 2018, to complete her first term and immediately begin her second.

=== Second term (2018–2021) ===
She expanded the Escudo Chihuahua security platform launched in her first term by adding over 500 new cameras, bringing the city's total to more than 1,000. The police fleet was renewed, the "School Police" and "Grandparent Police" programs were maintained, and a new "Neighborhood Watch" initiative was introduced. She also created a Tactical Analysis Unit, an Intelligence Room, and a Gender Crime Unit, establishing "orange zones" to support women facing violence. Panic buttons were installed at bus stops, and the municipal police earned triple ISO certification, as well as accreditation from the Commission on Accreditation for Law Enforcement Agencies (CALEA).

Economically, she launched the "City Brand" to attract tourism and investment. Major projects included a $14.5 million USD investment from The Home Depot. She fully digitized the city's most-used administrative procedures, expanded the municipal entrepreneurship fund, earned a AAA credit rating from Fitch Ratings, and received the Mayors of Mexico award for ease of doing business.

When the COVID-19 pandemic hit, her administration implemented measures to support families—such as food aid, hygiene supply distribution, and financial support for small businesses—followed by an economic recovery plan developed with business, academic, and civic leaders. Daily public space disinfections and supply deliveries to hospitals were also carried out.

Her public works projects included three "turbo roundabouts" the second lane of the University Overpass, the extension of Nogales Avenue, and the Periférico de la Juventud overpass at Valle Escondido and Vía Sicilia.

Chihuahua ranked first in transparency among Mexico's state capitals and third among all municipalities in the country. She implemented participatory budgeting, through which residents voted to build the city's first inclusive park for people with disabilities. She also applied the "quadruple helix" governance model, integrating government, industry, academia, and civil society.

Social initiatives expanded the women's support card program to 130,000 beneficiaries, launched the municipal dental clinic, opened a medical and psychological helpline, and guaranteed universal scholarship coverage for students in need or with outstanding academic or athletic performance. The San Martín Community Center was inaugurated, and the Family Development Center in Punta Oriente was rebuilt. When the federal government ended its childcare subsidy program, the city stepped in with municipal funding to keep local daycare centers open. Her administration made the largest municipal investment in educational infrastructure in the city's history and strengthened the D.A.R.E. program, reaching over 50,000 students.

She also engaged in national-level advocacy, visiting Mexico's National Palace to request more resources for Chihuahua's municipalities—a protest during which she was tear-gassed by presidential guards. She played a central role in defending water rights at the La Boquilla Dam, opposing the federal government's plan to divert water to Tamaulipas. This included supporting a protest encampment at the dam and negotiating with federal authorities, a conflict resolved shortly before she became governor-elect.

In 2019, she presented the "Iluminamos Chihuahua" project to replace 81,500 streetlights via a 15-year private contract valued at approximately 6.2 billion pesos. Civil organizations called for a public referendum, which resulted in the project's cancellation on the very night results were announced.

In June 2019, Campos signed a historic bilateral commission agreement with Albuquerque Mayor Tim Keller. The agreement seeks to strengthen ties between the cities by creating an Albuquerque – Chihuahua protocol for economic development, tourism and cultural exchange, public safety, and education.

"This new Commission will create trade and culture connections between us and our sister city Chihuahua, Mexico," said Mayor Keller. "When you're in Chihuahua, you can feel how much we share from the high desert landscapes to green chile, along with so much of the history and culture. We are taking the responsibility to step up and demonstrate that cities can help lead the way toward inter-border collaboration. Together, we will work towards strengthening economic development, tourism and culture, public safety, and education."

Campos presented a talk at the LAPA Georgetown forum on the role of Local Governments in the Fight Against Insecurity.

She was awarded the Norma Villarreal Prize for women in municipal politics and received three additional honors—for the "IMM in Your Company" program, the Escudo Chihuahua platform, and for promoting humanistic and transparent governance.

Her leadership extended beyond the city: she served as Vice President of Communications for the National Association of Mayors, and from 8 March to 14 October 2020, she was President of the National Conference of Municipalities of Mexico.

On 2 January 2021, she took leave from her position to seek her party's nomination for governor. María Angélica Granados Trespalacios was appointed as interim mayor.

== Governor of Chihuahua ==
=== 2021 elections ===
In early 2020, she publicly announced her intention to run for Governor of Chihuahua. On 13 December 2020 she officially registered as a pre-candidate for the governorship of Chihuahua in the National Action Party's internal selection process, where she competed against then-senator Gustavo Madero Muñoz.

The pre-campaign period ran from January 3 to 24, 2021, with her campaign kickoff taking place in Ciudad Juárez. On 24 January, she won the internal election, becoming the candidate of the "Nos Une Chihuahua" ("Chihuahua Unites Us") coalition after securing 61.92% of the votes cast by PAN members across the state.

She formally registered her candidacy with the state electoral institute on 15 March 2021, and began her official campaign on 4 April with a rally at La Boquilla Dam under the slogan "Together for a Better Future". Her campaign concluded on 2 June 2021. In the final stretch, she received public endorsements from two rival candidates—Graciela Ortiz González of the Institutional Revolutionary Party and María Eugenia Baeza of the Progressive Social Networks—both of whom announced they were withdrawing from the race.

The election took place on Sunday, 6 June 2021. She won with 576,176 votes, representing 42.45% of the total, securing a margin of more than 130,000 votes—almost a 10% lead—over her closest rival, Morena party candidate Juan Carlos Loera. A week later, she was officially certified as governor-elect.

However, the sitting governor, Javier Corral Jurado, refused to recognize her victory, leading to an atypical transition process in which he personally refused to participate in the handover of power, allowing only some of his cabinet members to take part.

Regarding the ongoing conflict over La Boquilla Dam, as governor-elect she initiated negotiations with then–Secretary of the Interior Adán Augusto López. She announced an agreement had been reached that included the release of farmers who had been detained by the National Guard, an end to the water transfers from the dam, and the allocation of support for farmers to modernize irrigation systems and fund new planting efforts.

=== Accusations and legal proceedings ===
In January 2021, the Chihuahua State Attorney General's Office accused her of having received at least 10.3 million pesos in bribes between 2014 and 2016 from then-governor César Duarte Jáquez. It was alleged that the payments took place during her time as deputy leader of the PAN legislative caucus in the state congress and during her first campaign for mayor of Chihuahua. She was forced to surrender her passport and pay a MXN $500,000 bond. Campos responded by denouncing the process as politically motivated, claiming that she had been denied access to evidence during the initial stages, as required by law, and asserting that then-governor Javier Corral was orchestrating a political persecution to block her path to the governorship and hand over the state to Morena.

While already a gubernatorial candidate, on April 1 of that year she was formally bound over for trial by a control judge after a hearing that lasted more than 42 hours. During the proceedings, her defense team was unable to fully dismiss the evidence presented by prosecutors, which included 34 receipts allegedly signed by her. Nevertheless, her political rights remained intact, allowing her to continue her candidacy and campaign. "I don't give up, I don't give in," Campos Galván said.

Months later, after being elected governor, the court dismissed the charges, ruling that the prosecution had failed to prove that the alleged bribes had influenced her legislative votes as a state deputy.

She was also investigated by the Specialized Anti-Corruption Prosecutor's Office for alleged acts of bribery and abuse of authority. According to the accusations, while serving as mayor of Chihuahua she had allegedly received monthly payments of over 1.3 million pesos from government contractors between 2017 and 2018. It was further claimed that she had ordered contracts for cleaning and maintenance of medians, parks, and public gardens to be awarded to five companies that, according to audit findings, were interconnected and had simulated competition in the bidding process. However, the same prosecutor's office later requested the State Superior Court of Justice to dismiss the case and withdrew the charges, and she was never formally indicted.

Campos Galván said that she looked forward to demonstrating that "the accusations are false," and that the whole process against her is "a political persecution based on falsified statements, fabrication of evidence, use of institutions, threats and a collusion of political actors, figures of the state government and other parties, with the intention of spreading lies, deceive citizens and damage the relationship of trust" that she has built with the people of Chihuahua.

=== Governorship ===
In the early hours of September 8, 2021, as the newly sworn-in governor of Chihuahua, she received outgoing governor Javier Corral, who signed the transition documents before declining to participate in the official swearing-in ceremony. That same day, during an extraordinary session of the Chihuahua State Congress held at the Plaza de la Mexicanidad in Ciudad Juárez, she formally assumed office for the 2021–2027 term, becoming the first woman to hold the governorship in the state's history.

In healthcare, she launched the MediChihuahua program following the dissolution of the federal Seguro Popular and INSABI systems, ensuring continued medical services for those without social security. She partnered with Grupo México to bring Dr. Vagón medical services to the Sierra Tarahumara, introduced the S+ electronic medical record system, and implemented chatbot technology for patient care via WhatsApp and telemedicine. Her administration established mobile medical clinics, inaugurated two linear accelerators for cancer treatment, added nine new mammography units, and created the state's cancer registry. She expanded specialized oncology infrastructure, established the catheter clinic in Parral, upgraded neonatal intensive care units, introduced a vasectomy clinic (placing Chihuahua second nationwide in productivity), and inaugurated the Regional Radiotherapy Center in Ciudad Juárez, among many other hospital renovations and health service expansions. She also launched NutriChihuahua and constructed twenty regional nutrition centers and a maternal shelter in the Sierra Tarahumara.

In social development, she created the Chihuahuan Institute for Child Development, established a new childcare network after the federal program was dismantled, and opened six youth development centers, including the Soy Joven house in Ciudad Juárez. She declared a gender violence alert in five municipalities, created support services for families of femicide victims, opened eleven women's shelters and 347 "Orange Points" for assistance, and launched an economic support card program that reached 130,000 women. She also fostered dialogue with indigenous communities through an unprecedented statewide gathering of traditional indigenous authorities and promoted cultural initiatives such as the Re'We festival of traditional games.

In culture and education, she restored major cultural venues, decreed free museum entry on Thursdays, and increased preschool enrollment from 54% to 62%. She incorporated robotics workshops and new science and technology labs in technical schools. Under her leadership, Chihuahua climbed from 26th place to the top rankings in Mexico's national sports competitions, and professional baseball returned to the state with the revival of the Dorados team. She also relaunched the multicultural Omáwari Festival and declared Los Seremos a part of Chihuahua's intangible cultural heritage.

In economic development, Chihuahua became the nation's leading exporter, ranked fifth in overall growth, fourth in wage growth, first in employment rate, and second in lowest labor informality. The state also advanced in the IMCO competitiveness index, entering the top ten nationally. Her administration created the Sustainable Energy Development Trust, the State Science, Technology and Innovation Fund, and promoted circular economy models. She inaugurated Spark Innovation Park, installed over 2,000 solar panels in public buildings, and launched the Barrancas del Cobre International Airport, adding new air routes that improved connectivity. Guachochi and Hidalgo del Parral were designated as Pueblos Mágicos.

In infrastructure, she oversaw the construction of the Migrant Children's Assistance Center, the Pico de Águila Dam, and new facilities for public safety and social services. She modernized highways, hospitals, parks, and sports arenas, and launched JuárezBus, the city's BRT system with GPS-equipped buses.

In security, she implemented the Centinela surveillance platform with over 10,000 cameras, created immediate response centers, women's justice centers, and launched specialized units such as the Rosa Squad, SWAT, and the Mining, Banking, and Forestry police divisions. She promoted the recognition of forced displacement as a crime, achieved CALEA Triple Accreditation for state police processes, modernized the C4 into C7-IA (the first in Latin America), and reduced key crimes significantly: homicides dropped 22%, vehicle theft with violence 28%, home burglary with violence 25%, and drug dealing offenses 54%. Public trust in the state police also improved notably.

In governance and finance, she created new state secretariats, implemented the first Digital Government Law, expanded free internet access points, raised compliance with public asset declarations from 37.4% to 91.3%, increased own revenues by 33%, reduced public debt by 15%, and eliminated the fiscal deficit. Under her leadership, Chihuahua was recognized as the state least dependent on federal transfers, while Fitch Ratings and HR Ratings improved the state's credit ratings.

Her leadership earned national recognition, including the Antea Award from the National Chamber of Radio and Television, and in 2025 she was named coordinator of the National Governors Conference (CONAGO) for the National Action Party.

== Professional career ==
Beyond politics, she has worked in academia and media. She served as a full-time professor at Tecnológico de Monterrey, teaching courses in private international law and diplomatic and consular policies, and has also been a columnist for outlets such as El Heraldo de Chihuahua.
