= Morelos Municipality, Chihuahua =

Municipality in the Mexican state of Chihuahua

Morelos
- Municipality
- Municipality of Morelos in Chihuahua

- Location in Mexico
- Coordinates: 26°40′15″N 107°40′39″W
- Country: Mexico
- State: Chihuahua
- Municipal seat: Morelos

Area
  - Total: 1,336.8 km^{2} (516.1 sq mi)

Population (2010)
  - Total: 8,343
  - Density: 6.241/km^{2} (16.16/sq mi)

Morelos is one of the 67 municipalities of Chihuahua, in north-western Mexico. The municipal seat lies at Morelos. The municipality covers an area of 1336.8 km^{2}.

As of 2010, the municipality had a total population of 8,343, up from 7,172 as of 2005.

The municipality had 556 localities, none of which had a population over 1,000.

The municipality's name honors Independence War hero José María Morelos.

== Geography ==
=== Towns and villages ===
The municipality has 295 localities. The largest are:

| Name | Population (2005) |
|---|---|
| Morelos | 735 |
| Ciénega Prieta | 371 |
| El Tablón | 346 |
| Potrero de Los Bojórquez | 314 |
| Rancho Mesa los Leales | 222 |
| Total Municipality | 7,172 |
