= Javier Corral =

American-born Mexican politician

Javier Corral Jurado
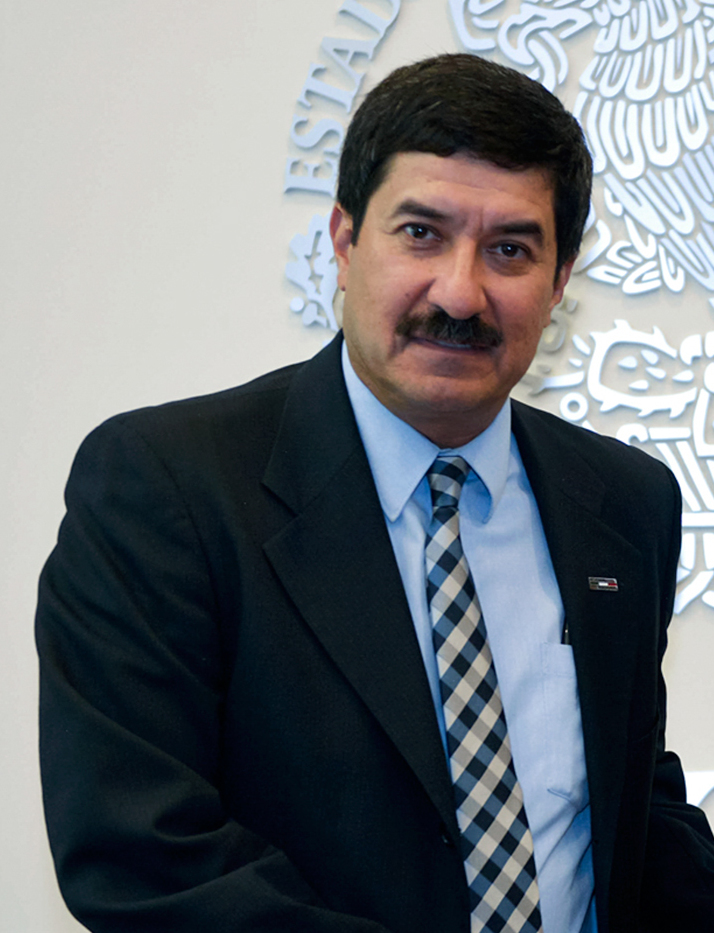
- Javier Corral in 2016

Governor of Chihuahua
- In office October 4, 2016 – September 7, 2021
- Preceded by: César Duarte Jáquez
- Succeeded by: Maru Campos

Personal details
- Born: 2 August 1966 (age 60) El Paso, Texas, U.S.
- Citizenship: Mexico; United States
- Party: Morena (since 2024)
- Other political affiliations: PAN (until 2023)
- Spouse: Cinthia Aideé Chavira Gamboa
- Website: Javier Corral

Javier Corral Jurado (born 2 August 1966) is an American-born Mexican politician affiliated with Morena. Formerly affiliated with the National Action Party (PAN), he served as Governor of Chihuahua from 2016 to 2021. He has served in politics since the early 1980s, including six terms between the Chamber of Deputies and Senate. Corral also specializes in communications and has a long career as a columnist and founder of various publications; he also was instrumental in the successful constitutional challenge that struck down the Televisa Law.

== Early life and education ==
Corral was born on 2 August 1966 in El Paso, Texas, United States but spent much of his childhood across the border in Ciudad Juárez, Chihuahua; in a 2016 interview, he noted that "although I was born on the other side of the border, I am 100 percent juarense". His mother, Socorro Jurado Ríos, sought to protect her children by giving birth to them in the United States. Javier was named for Javier Solís, an actor who had died several months before his birth. In 1978, Corral's mother died when a gas tanker exploded on the Mexico City-Querétaro highway and killed 200 people; by this time, she was selling jewelry and clothing in order to support her six children, and she had already separated from Corral's father.

At the age of 11, Corral worked for El Diario de Juárez newspaper and was referred to as "the kid journalist". In 1979, he traveled to the White House to receive the International Youth Journalism Award from President Jimmy Carter. Not long after, Arnoldo Cabada de la O, then an employee at XEJ-TDT, invited him to work on his newscast; when Cabada had a falling out with station owner Pedro Meneses Hoyos, Corral followed Cabada to the new XHIJ-TDT.

== Early work ==
Corral's career in public service began in the early 1980s, inspired by sermons he heard from Bishop Manuel Talamás Camandari while he served as an altar boy. He joined the National Action Party (Partido Acción Nacional, PAN) in 1982 — a political decision that caused him to split from Cabada and leave XHIJ — and served brief stints as the Director of Public Relations and Press for the public services unit of the Chihuahua Municipality, then as the Chief of Press for the public safety unit of the municipality. From 1982 to 1983, he served as Secretary General of the Chihuahua State Association of Journalists. In the PAN, he assisted candidates for municipal President of Ciudad Juárez. In 1985 and 1986, he founded and directed two publications: Ya es tiempo (It's Time), the official magazine of the PAN candidacy for Governor of Chihuahua in 1986, and a protest magazine, El Cincel.

== Chihuahua legislature ==
His first candidacy for elected office was in 1991 when he ran for federal deputy, which he lost. The next year, Corral was elected to the LVII Legislature of Chihuahua. There, he presided over the Justice and Human Rights and Editorial Matters Commissions. Two years after his term ended, he was elected as a federal deputy to the LVII Legislature; he would serve twelve of the next fifteen years as deputy and senator in Congress. In the LVII Legislature, he presided over the Radio, Television and Film Commission, sat on two other commissions, and served as the deputy coordinator of culture, communication and relations for the PAN parliamentary group in the chamber. Corral then served as Senator during the LVIII and LIX Legislatures; he presided over the Communications and Transportation and Rules and Parliamentary Practices Commissions. He sat on seven other commissions in his six-year term, including Border Matters, Special for State Reform, and the bicameral commission that governs Canal del Congreso.

While in the LIX Legislature, Corral completed his undergraduate degree in law and social sciences at the Universidad de Occidente in Los Mochis, Sinaloa.

In May 2006, a group of 47 senators headed by Corral, Manuel Bartlett Díaz and César Raúl Ojeda Zubieta presented a constitutional challenge to the recently passed Televisa Law before the Supreme Court of Justice of the Nation. In August 2007, the court declared the law invalid. His confrontational stance against traditional broadcasters continued; in 2007, the Federal Electoral Tribunal cleared Corral of responsibility over a debt of 1 million pesos allegedly owed to Televisa stemming from advertising time bought during his 2004 run for governor.

In 2009, Corral returned to the Chamber of Deputies in the LXI Legislature, presiding over the Government Commission and serving on four others, including Radio, Television and Film. That same year, he taught at the UNAM as a graduate professor of information rights. Three years later, he returned to the Senate for the LXII and LXIII Legislatures, presiding yet again on the Rules and Parliamentary Practices Commission and serving as Secretary of the Communications and Transportation Commission. He also sat on the Education and Government Commissions in both the LXII and LXIII Legislatures and the Foreign Relations (Latin America and Caribbean) Commission from 2012 to 2013. In the summer of 2015, Corral ran for national president of the PAN and lost by a wide margin to Ricardo Anaya.

== Governor of Chihuahua ==
Corral launched a failed campaign ran for governor in 2004 under a PAN-PCD-PRD coalition banner. On February 9, 2016, Corral resigned from the Senate in order to make his second bid for Governor of Chihuahua; in the legislature he was succeeded by Sylvia Leticia Martínez Elizondoes . On June 5, 2016 he defeated PRI coalition's candidate, Enrique Serrano Escobar, with 39 versus 31 percent.

A dispute over water distribution at La Boquilla Dam in September 2020 left two demonstrors dead at the hands of the National Guard.

Between October 2016 and January 2021 there were 10,042 homicides, of which 95% have gone unpunished, according to the Attorney General's Office (FGE) and the State Judiciary. More than half the murders were in Ciudad Juárez, mostly attributed to organized crime. Ten percent of the victims were women. Officially 3,513 people have been reported missing, although civil groups say the true number is much higher; 52% of the missing cases have occurred during the Coral administration. Also since 2016 narcofosas (mass graves attributed to organized crime) have been discovered — in Cuauhtémoc, Valle de Juárez, El Navajo creek (December 2016), Madera (June 2017), Guadalupe Municipality (June 2018), and Mariano Matamoros (February 2019).

== Other work ==
In 1987 and 1988, Corral was a member of the company Administración Profesional de Negocios; in 1989, he co-founded Meridiano 107. He also worked for a variety of local and national media outlets including El Fronterizo and El Universal, as well as publications in the field of communications such as Revista Mexicana de Comunicación and Etcétera.

In 2012, his appearances on Antena Radio, the newscast of the Instituto Mexicano de la Radio, resulted in a fine as the IFE ruled that they illegally constituted additional airtime for the PAN beyond what it was entitled to under electoral law.
