= Tabar Rural District =

Rural district in North Khorasan province, Iran

Tabar Rural District Persian: دهستان طبر
- Rural District
- Location within Iran
- Coordinates: 37°17′24″N 56°50′24″E
- Country: Iran
- Province: North Khorasan
- County: Jajrom
- District: Jolgeh Shuqan
- Established: 1998
- Capital: Tabar

Population (2016)
  - Total: 4,175
- Time zone: UTC+3:30 (IRST)

Tabar Rural District (Persian: دهستان طبر) is in Jolgeh Shuqan District (Note: Formerly Dashtkuh District) of Jajrom County, North Khorasan province, Iran. Its capital is the village of Tabar.

== Demographics ==
=== Population ===
At the time of the 2006 National Census, the rural district's population was 5,012 in 1,375 households. There were 4,711 inhabitants in 1,460 households at the following census of 2011. The 2016 census measured the population of the rural district as 4,175 in 1,398 households. The most populous of its 15 villages was Chahar Bid, with 1,329 people.

=== Other villages in the rural district ===
- Ab Barik
- Barazarlu
- Cheshmeh Tabari
- Garmak
- Jushqan
- Kalateh-ye Hajj Ali Akbar
- Kotalli
- Mohammadabad-e Tabar
- Pish Darreh
