= Morelos, Chihuahua =

Town in the Mexican state of Chihuahua

Morelos
- Town
- Location in Mexico
- Coordinates: 29°39′N 107°42′W
- Country: Mexico
- State: Chihuahua
- Municipality: Morelos Municipality

Population (2010)
  - Total: 813

Morelos is a town and seat of the municipality of Morelos Municipality, in the northern Mexican state of Chihuahua. As of 2010, the town had a population of 813, up from 735 as of 2005.
