= Navia, Asturias =

Navia
- Municipality
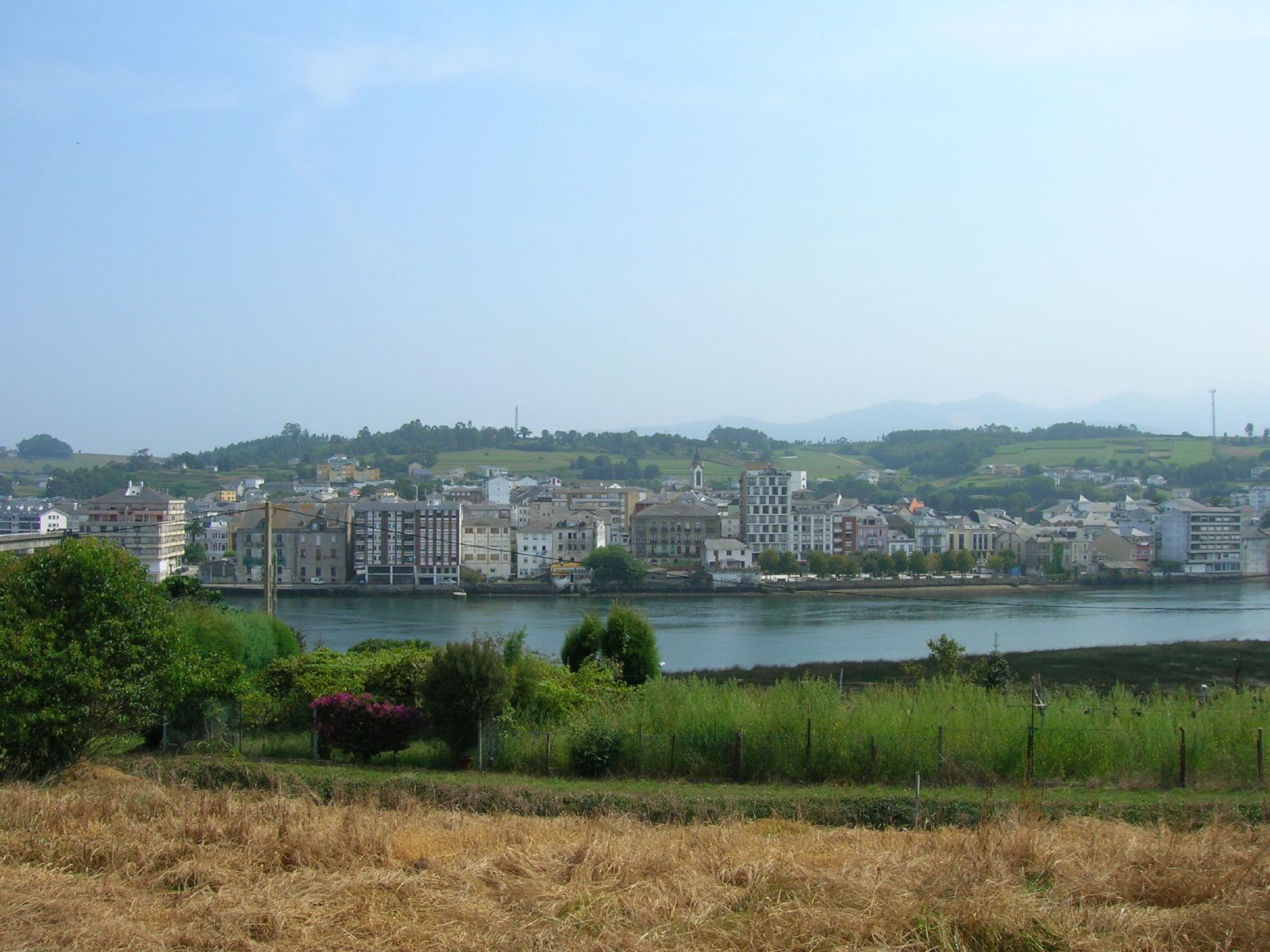
- View of Navia.

- Flag Coat of arms

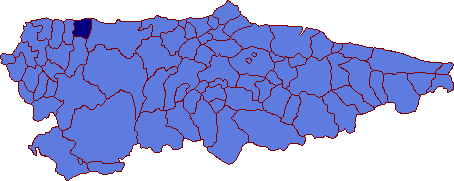

- Location in Spain
- Coordinates: 43°32′N 6°43′W
- Country: Spain
- Autonomous community: Asturias
- Province: Asturias
- Comarca: Eo-Navia
- Judicial district: Valdés
- Capital: Navia

Government
  - Mayor: Ignacio García Palacios (PSOE)

Area
  - Total: 63.12 km^{2} (24.37 sq mi)
- Highest elevation: 842 m (2,762 ft)

Population (2025-01-01)
  - Total: 8,031
  - Density: 127.2/km^{2} (329.5/sq mi)
- Demonym: Naviegos
- Time zone: UTC+1 (CET)
  - Summer (DST): UTC+2 (CEST)
- Postal code: 33710
- Website: Official website

Navia is a municipality in the Autonomous Community of the Principality of Asturias, Spain. It lies on the Cantabrian Sea, and is bordered by the municipalities of Villayón to the south, Valdés to the east, and Coaña to the west. It is also the name of a parish and a village in the municipality.

The Navia River flows through the municipality.

== Parishes ==
- Andés
- Anleo
- Navia
- Piñera
- Polavieja
- Puerto de Vega
- Villanueva
- Villapedre

== See also ==
- List of municipalities in Asturias
