= Jolgeh Shuqan District =

District in North Khorasan province, Iran

Jolgeh Shuqan District Persian: بخش جلگه شوقان
- District
- Location within Iran
- Coordinates: 37°19′15″N 56°49′15″E
- Country: Iran
- Province: North Khorasan
- County: Jajrom
- Established: 1997
- Capital: Shuqan

Population (2016)
  - Total: 8,985
- Time zone: UTC+3:30 (IRST)

Jolgeh Shuqan District (Persian: بخش جلگه شوقان) (Note: Formerly Dashtkuh District (بخش دشتكوه)) is in Jajrom County, North Khorasan province, Iran. Its capital is the city of Shuqan.

== Demographics ==
=== Population ===
At the time of the 2006 National Census, the district's population was 9,847 in 2,728 households. The following census in 2011 counted 9,667 people in 2,996 households. The 2016 census measured the population of the district as 8,985 inhabitants in 2,935 households.

=== Administrative divisions ===
Jolgeh Shuqan District Population
| Administrative Divisions | 2006 | 2011 | 2016 |
|---|---|---|---|
| Shuqan RD (Note: Formerly Jolgeh Shuqan Rural District) | 2,538 | 2,520 | 2,497 |
| Tabar RD | 5,012 | 4,711 | 4,175 |
| Shuqan (city) | 2,297 | 2,436 | 2,313 |
| Total | 9,847 | 9,667 | 8,985 |
RD = Rural District
