= Ghost station =

Disused train stations

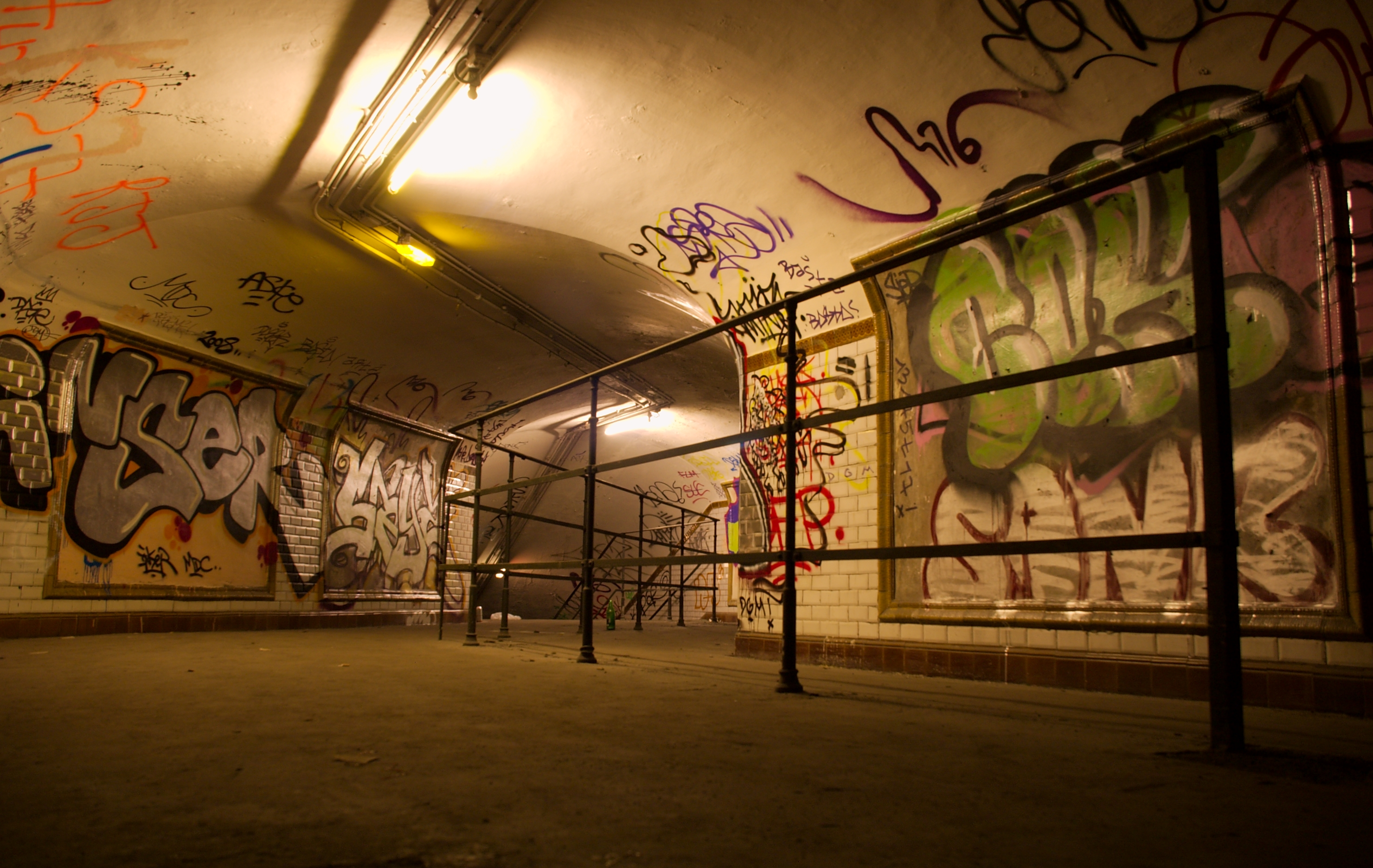
Saint-Martin, a ghost station in the Paris Métro

A ghost station is a closed or never opened train station through which revenue-service passenger trains (especially rapid transit trains) pass but at which they do not stop. The term is also sometimes used for any unused underground station or any unused station, whether or not trains pass through them. In Germany, a station that has been built in the course of constructing something else as a so-called "Bauvorleistung" (roughly: construction pre-effort) is referred to as a "ghost station", despite the different purpose and origin of the terms. Some English-language publications also refer to "pre-built" stations or parts thereof that have yet to see service as "ghost stations".

== Origin of the term ==
The term "ghost station" is a calque of the German word Geisterbahnhof (plural Geisterbahnhöfe). The German term was coined to describe certain stations on Berlin's U-Bahn and S-Bahn networks that were closed during the period of Berlin's division during the Cold War because they were an integral part of a transit line mostly located on the eastern side of the Berlin Wall. The term was coined by West Berliners who observed the dim lit, heavily guarded stations through their carriages, likening the guards of East German borders to ghosts. Soon after the Wall fell, most of the stations reopened.

== Ghost stations in Berlin ==
=== Background ===
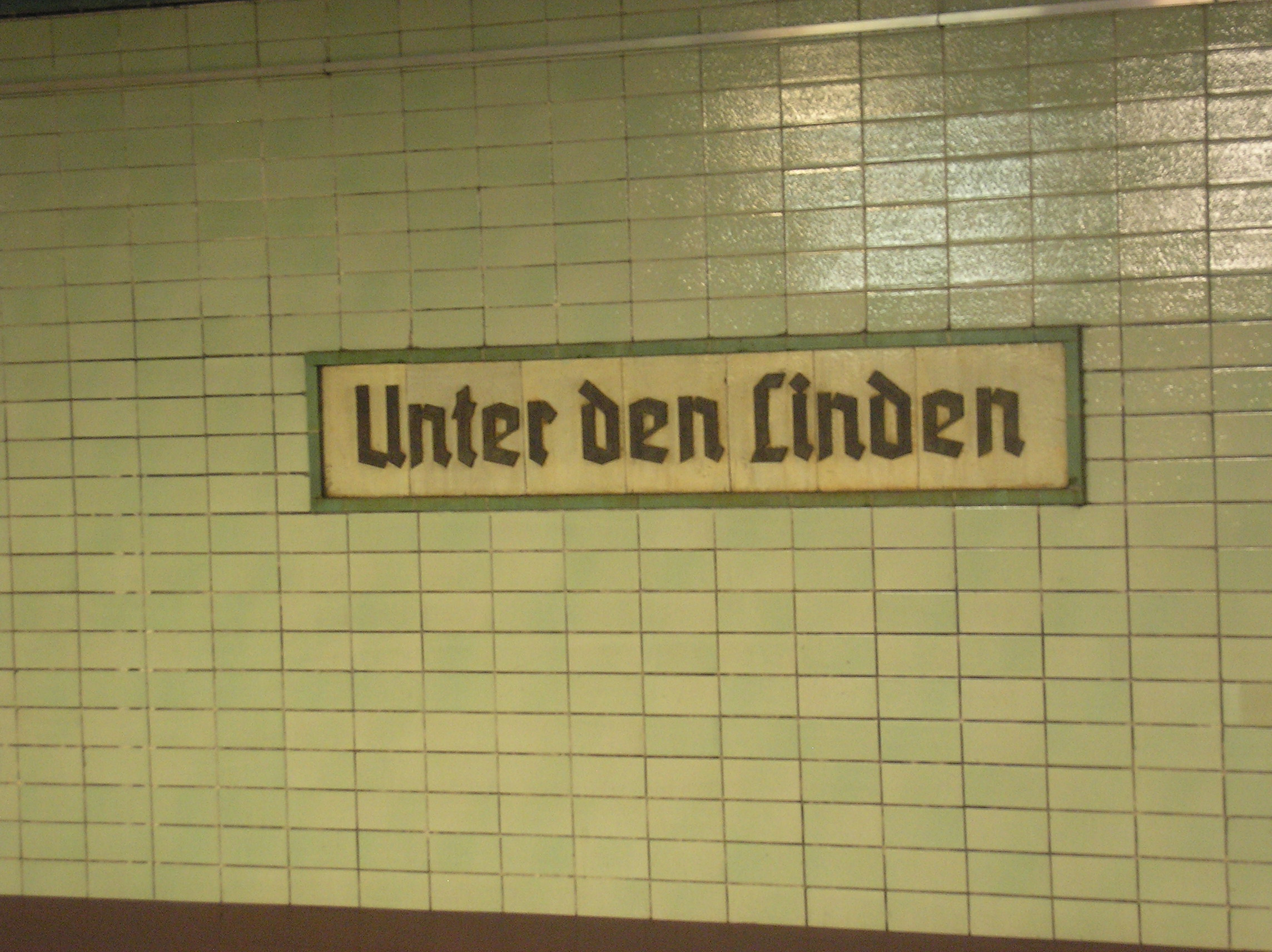
Sign at Unter den Linden in 2007, unchanged since the 1930s. It has since been covered by a modern sign showing the station's new name, "Brandenburger Tor".

Map of ghost stations in Berlin

In August 1961 the East German government built the Berlin Wall, ending freedom of movement between East and West Berlin. As a result, the Berlin public transit network, which had formerly spanned both halves of the city, was also divided into two. Some U- and S-Bahn lines fell entirely into one half of the city or the other; other lines were divided between the two jurisdictions, with trains running only to the border and then turning back. However, there were three lines—the U-Bahn lines now designated U6 and U8, and the Nord–Süd Tunnel on the S-Bahn—that ran for the most part through West Berlin but passed for a short distance through the borough of Mitte (the historic city centre), which was East Berlin territory. These lines continued to be open to West Berliners; however, trains did not stop at most of the stations located within East Berlin, though for technical reasons they did have to slow down significantly while passing through. The name Geisterbahnhof was soon aptly applied to these dimly lit, heavily guarded stations by travellers from West Berlin, who watched them pass by through the carriage windows. However, the term was never official; West Berlin U-Bahn maps of the period simply labelled these stations "Bahnhöfe, auf denen die Züge nicht halten" ("stations at which the trains do not stop"). East Berlin maps neither depicted the West Berlin lines nor the ghost stations. U-Bahn maps in the Friedrichstraße transfer station were unique: They depicted all the Western lines, but not the Geisterbahnhöfe, and showed the city divided into "Berlin, Hauptstadt der DDR" ("Berlin, capital of the German Democratic Republic") and "Westberlin", the official terminology used by East Germany.

The lines were a vital part of the West Berlin transit network, but because part of the route of some of the lines lay in East Berlin territory, it was difficult for Western support staff to perform maintenance work on the tracks and tunnels. If a train on a West Berlin line broke down in East Berlin territory, then passengers had to wait for Eastern border police to appear and escort them out. The East German government occasionally hinted that it might someday block access to the tunnels at the border and run its own service on the East Berlin sections of these lines. However, this awkward status quo persisted for the entire 28-year period of the division of Berlin.

At the closed stations, barbed wire fences were installed to prevent any would-be escapees from East Berlin from accessing the track bed, and the electrically live third rail served as an additional and potentially lethal deterrent. An alarm was triggered if anyone breached one of the barriers. As for the entrances, the signage was removed, walkways were walled up and stairways were sealed with concrete slabs. Police stations were built into the windowed platform service booths, from which the whole platform area could be monitored.

A wide white line on the wall marked the exact location of the border. Later, gates were installed at some stations that could be rolled into place at night while the guards were off-duty. Guard posts at other stations were staffed continuously, creating additional employment positions with the transport police. In the platform area, the guards always worked in pairs, and care was taken in their assignment to assure that there would be no personal ties between them. In addition, superior officers could conduct surprise inspections at any time, thus, maintaining maximum security. Other stations were secured by the East German border guards.

=== Particular stations ===
Friedrichstraße station, though served by Western lines and located in East Berlin territory, was not a Geisterbahnhof. Instead, it served as a transfer point between U6 and several S-Bahn lines. Western passengers could walk from one platform to another without ever leaving the station or having to show papers, much like air travellers changing planes at an international airport. Westerners with appropriate visas could also enter East Berlin there (they could even get a visa in the station). There was an Intershop in the station that could be accessed without having to pass a border or customs checkpoint of either East or West Germany and it was thus a popular place for westerners to buy cheap alcohol in D-Mark, but the West Berlin customs considered goods bought there contraband and did spot checks on what they considered customs evasion.

The Bornholmer Straße S-Bahn station was the only ghost station not located in a tunnel. It was situated close to the wall near the Bornholmer Straße border crossing. West Berlin trains passed through it without stopping. East Berlin S-Bahn trains passed the same station but on different tracks. The tracks used by Western and Eastern trains were sealed off from each other by a tall fence.

Another oddity was Wollankstraße station. Like Bornholmer Straße, it was an S-Bahn stop served by West Berlin trains, but located on East Berlin territory just behind the border. However, Wollankstraße was in use and accessible for West Berliners, as one of its exits opened on a West Berlin street. This exit was exactly on the border line, a warning sign next to it informing passengers about the situation. Its other exits to East Berlin streets were blocked.

=== Reopening ===
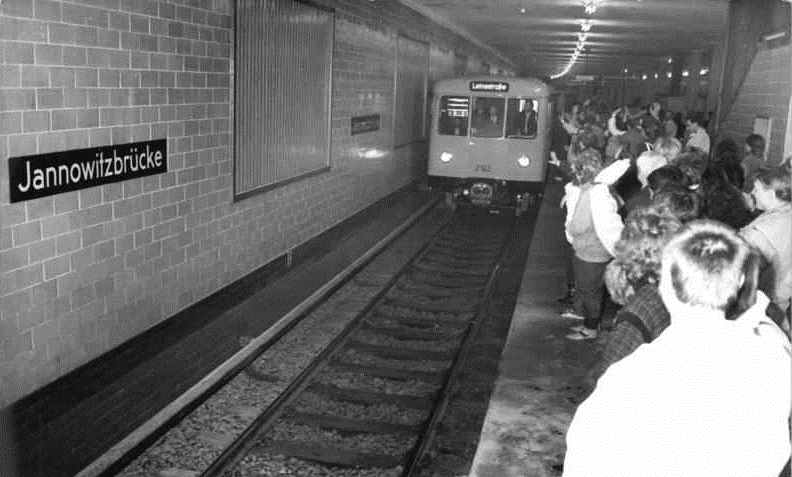
The reopening of Jannowitzbrücke U-Bahn station on 11 November 1989, the first of the ghost stations to be reopened after the Fall of the Berlin Wall

The first people to enter the ghost stations after the fall of the Berlin Wall in November 1989 found that they lived up to their informal name, with ads and signage on the walls unchanged since 1961. None of them have been preserved.

The first ghost station to reopen to passenger traffic was Jannowitzbrücke (U8) on 11 November 1989, two days after the fall of the Wall. It was equipped with a checkpoint within the station akin to Friedrichstraße, where East German customs and border control were provisionally installed to facilitate passengers heading to or coming from East Berlin. Hand-drawn destination signs were hung up covering the old ones from pre-1961; these signs were both crumbling from age and obviously missing the termini of post-1961 line extensions. On 22 December 1989, Rosenthaler Platz (U8) was reopened with a similar provisional checkpoint.

On 12 April 1990, the third station to reopen was Bernauer Straße (U8). As its northern exit was directly on the border, it could be opened with direct access to West Berlin without the need of a checkpoint. Its southern exit towards East Berlin was not reopened until 1 July 1990.

Discussions on reopening all the U6 and U8 stations including the S-Bahn station Oranienburger Straße, Unter den Linden and Nordbahnhof had begun on 13 April 1990 without border controls. These took two months to clean up, removing all the dirt and refurbishing the interiors; all stations had been reopened on 1 July 1990 at 11 a.m., as East Berlin and East Germany had adopted the West German currency (DM), leaving the border checkpoints abandoned.

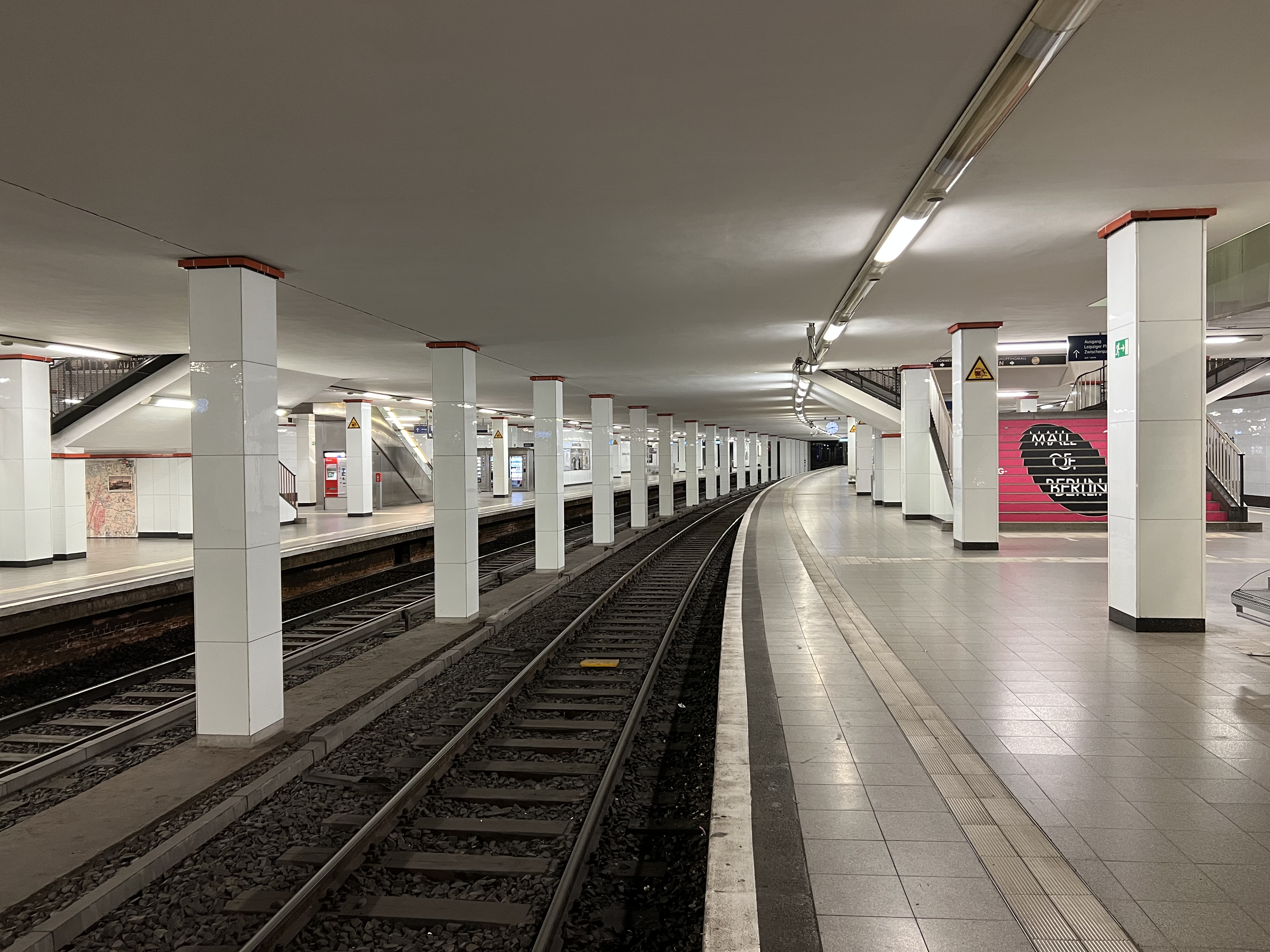
S-Bahn station Potsdamer Platz – formerly a ghost station and now reopened

On 2 July 1990, Oranienburger Straße was the first ghost station on the Nord-Süd-S-Bahn to reopen. On 1 September 1990, Unter den Linden and Nordbahnhof were opened following reconstruction works. On 12 December 1990, Bornholmer Straße was reopened for West Berlin trains; a second platform for East Berlin trains allowing interchange followed on 5 August 1991. The very last ghost station to reopen was Potsdamer Platz, which opened on 3 March 1992, following an extensive restoration of the entire North–South tunnel.

In the following years, the city and German government put a great deal of effort into restoring and reunifying the S-Bahn and U-Bahn networks in Berlin. The U-Bahn system reached its pre-war status in 1995 with the reopening of Warschauer Straße on U1. The S-Bahn system reached a preliminary completion in 2002 (with the reopening of the ring), even though there are still disused sections of lines closed in the aftermath of the wall. Decisions on reopening of some of these sections are still to be made. There was a political promise made in the course of reunification that all S-Bahn lines and services shut down due to partition were to be restored – with federal funds if need be – but as of 2021 this is still not the case and some former services are seen to be as of lower importance than proposed entirely new construction.

=== List of all Berlin ghost stations ===
This list only includes those stations in East Berlin territory that western trains passed through without stopping. There were other stations on both sides of the wall that were closed during the division because those sections of track were not in use.

Temporary checkpoints were set up for stations with access to East Berlin that were reopened before 1 July 1990. Checkpoints were no longer necessary for those reopened after that date when border checks were eliminated with the currency union between East and West Germany.

List of Berlin's ghost stations as a result of the Cold War
Nord–Süd S-Bahn (S1, S2 and S25)
No.	Station	Date reopened	Remarks	Order of reopening
1	Bornholmer Straße	12 December 1990		7
2	Nordbahnhof	1 September 1990		6
3	Oranienburger Straße	2 July 1990	First S-Bahn ghost station to reopen	5
4	Unter den Linden	1 September 1990	Renamed Brandenburger Tor station. Named in honor of East German Prime Minister Otto Grotewohl, 1949–1989.	6
5	Potsdamer Platz	3 March 1992	Named in honor of East German President Wilhelm Pieck, 1949–1989.	8
U 6
1	Schwartzkopffstraße	1 July 1990	From approximately 1951 to 1971, the Schwartzkopffstraße station bore the name Walter-Ulbricht-Stadion after a nearby stadium named in honour of Walter Ulbricht, then the First Secretary of the Socialist Unity Party (SED) and de facto leader of East Germany. In 1971, when Ulbricht was deposed and replaced by Erich Honecker, the stadium and station were renamed Stadion der Weltjugend (Stadium of World Youth). The original name was restored in 1991.	4
2	Nordbahnhof	1 July 1990	Renamed Zinnowitzer Straße (1991–2009), then Naturkundemuseum (from 2009)	4
3	Oranienburger Tor	1 July 1990		4
4	Französische Straße	1 July 1990	Closed again December 2020 (see below)	4
5	Stadtmitte	1 July 1990	Only the U6 station was closed. East Berlin Underground line A (part of today's U2) trains continued to stop here.	4
U 8
1	Bernauer Straße	12 April 1990	Only direct access to West Berlin was opened on this date (without the need for a checkpoint). The southern exit to East Berlin was not reopened until 1 July 1990.	3
2	Rosenthaler Platz	22 December 1989	Temporary checkpoint set up for border crossing into East Berlin.	2
3	Weinmeisterstraße	1 July 1990		4
4	Alexanderplatz	1 July 1990	Only the U8 station was closed. East Berlin Underground line A (part of today's U2), and line E (today numbered U5), as well as S-Bahn trains continued to stop here.	4
5	Jannowitzbrücke	11 November 1989	Only the U8 station was closed. East Berlin S-Bahn trains continued to stop here. After reopening, checkpoints were set up for border crossing into East Berlin.	1
6	Heinrich-Heine-Straße	1 July 1990		4

=== New ghost stations after reunification ===
In contrast with the above-listed stations, multiple stations in the Berlin area that were of high importance during the Cold War rapidly lost importance and passengers after reunification, some to the point of becoming ghost stations. The most notable examples are:

- Genshagener Heide (in German): station on the Berlin Outer Ring located due south of Berlin, quite far from any populated place, lost its importance with the resumption of direct routes from the Potsdam area to East Berlin and due to the reduction of the workforce in the Industriewerke Ludwigsfelde factory located nearby. Trains running between Potsdam and the Berlin Schönefeld Flughafen station stopped at the station until December 2012. Since then all passenger trains pass through without stopping and it was officially reclassified to a Betriebsbahnhof (service station). A train stop named Ludwigsfelde-Struveshof was built 2 km (1.2 mi) to the west (closer to populated areas) and brought into service with the closure of the Genshagener Heide station.
- Potsdam Pirschheide: an interchange station also located on the Berlin Outer Ring on the outskirts of Potsdam, named Potsdam Hauptbahnhof (Potsdam Main station) between 1961 and 1993, was the most important station of Potsdam when the traffic flow to West Berlin (Berlin–Magdeburg railway) was severely restricted. After resumption of service between Potsdam and Berlin-Wannsee station, the Pirschheide station lost its importance, became unstaffed in 1994. Tracks on the upper deck were demolished in 1999 (leaving only a pair of through tracks not adjacent to any platform), and on the lower deck only a single platform was left in service for use by the local trains from Potsdam to Michendorf. Although its present-day importance is negligible and its decaying appearance is not unlike "real" ghost stations from the Cold War era, it still has regular passenger trains stopping at it.
- Due to the delays in opening Berlin Brandenburg Airport the train station serving it (which was ready for use on the originally planned opening date in 2012) was served by empty trains to prevent mold.
- Französische Straße (Berlin U-Bahn) mentioned above shut down permanently in December 2020 when the new interchange station with the extended U5 opened as the two are too close to each other. It is thus the only Berlin U-Bahn station to be a ghost station twice over and for entirely different reasons.

== Ghost stations elsewhere ==
=== Argentina ===
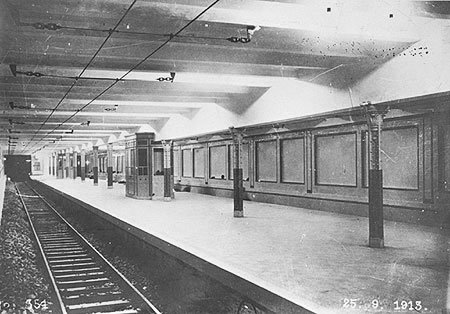
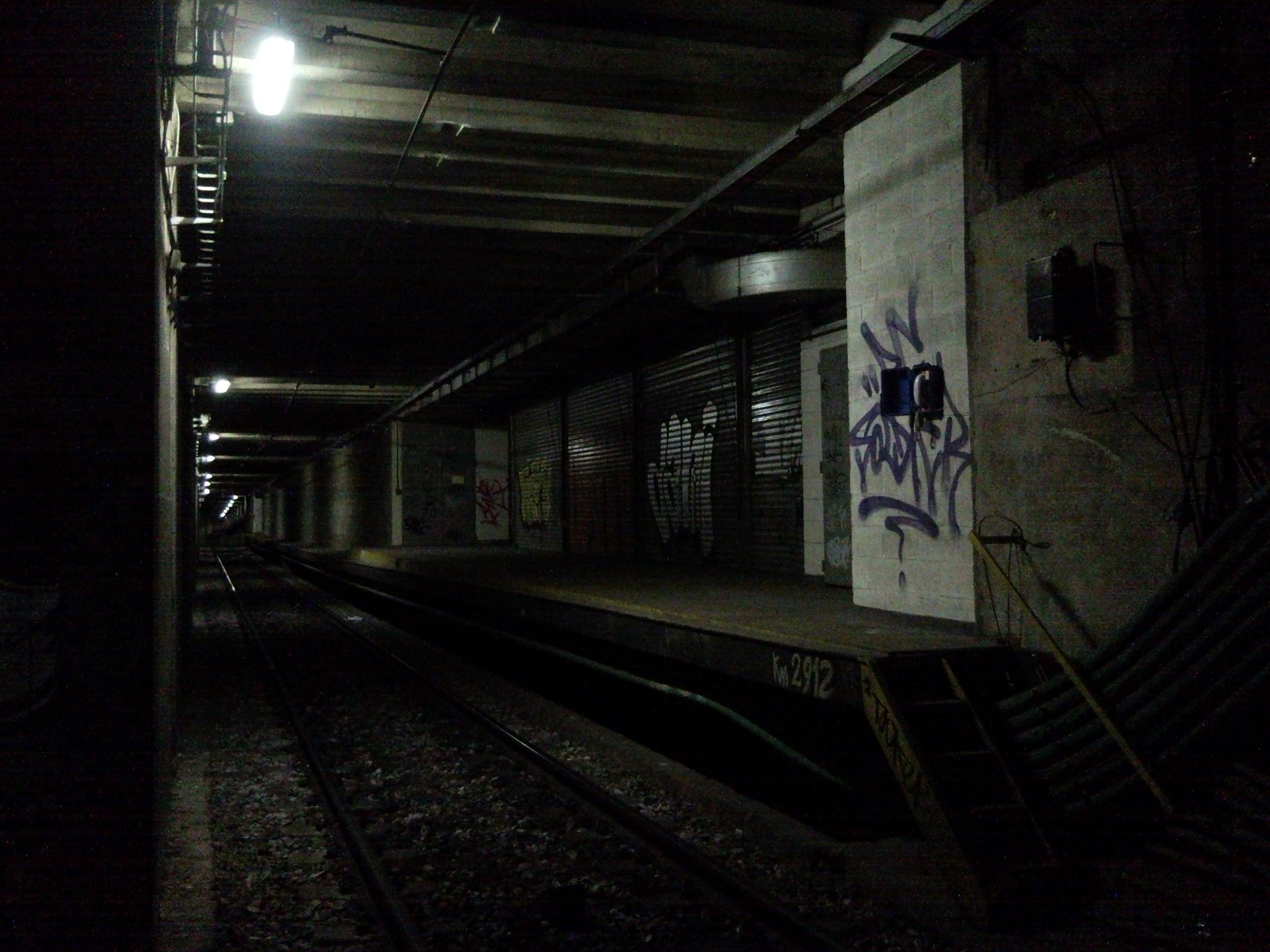
Alberti Norte station in 1913 (top/left) and 2009 (bottom/right)

The Buenos Aires Underground has four ghost stations. The two stations on Line A were originally two single-platform stations closed in 1953 since their close proximity meant trains had to stop in quick succession and frequencies were reduced. Their opposing platforms, located just metres away from each of the ghost stations, still remain open as Pasco and Alberti stations. The stations are preserved to maintain their original appearance and can still be seen when travelling on the line, even being used as a display for a time.

On Line E, the two stations were closed in 1966 when the line was re-routed closer to the centre of Buenos Aires in order to improve passenger numbers. They have both been used as maintenance areas for Line E and Line C, while one of the stations served as a set for the 1996 Argentine film Moebius. The stations were under consideration to be re-purposed as part of the new Line F, however it was later decided to build new tunnels instead.

There are also two stations (Apeadero Boedo and Apeadero Carranza) on Line E and Line D which were designed to be used as temporary stations while their respective lines were being extended. Though the platforms remain, they cannot be considered true ghost stations since they were never intended to be a permanent part of the network and designed to be re-purposed as electrical substations once the permanent stations were built.

- Underground Line A
  - Pasco Sur
  - Alberti Norte
- Underground Line E
  - San José vieja
  - Constitución

=== Australia ===
- General Motors on the Gippsland railway line. (Not an underground station, nor part of an underground network).
- Nyanda on the Gold Coast railway line. (Not an underground station, nor part of an underground network).
- Woollahra on the Eastern Suburbs railway line. (Not an underground station, partially constructed but never opened).

=== Austria ===
- Vienna Underground Railway (U-Bahn): Station Lerchenfelder Straße of line U2 closed in 2003 and the old Westbahnhof station. The U2 station An den alten Schanzen is planned to be in use in 2024, but not yet opened.
- Vienna Rapid Transit (S-Bahn): several stations have been closed: Radetzkyplatz, Brigittenau Vorortebahnhof, Baumgarten in 1939, the old Praterstern station, Strandbäder in 2000, Kahlenbergerdorf in 2004, Breitenleer Straße in 2010
- Several stations along the Arlberg Railway line: Braz, Hintergasse, Dalaas, Wald am Arlberg and Klösterle.

=== Belgium ===
- Sainctelette, a never opened Brussels Metro station on lines 2 and 6 between Yser and Ribaucourt, left unfinished because of its proximity to adjacent stations.
- The Charleroi light rail system is notable for several stations and lines built but never opened.

=== Brazil ===
- Paraíso (São Paulo Metro), platforms of the Moema branch, never opened
- Pedro II (São Paulo Metro), underground docks that would serve the Southeast-Southwest line, but which would not have been put into service
- Pirelli Station (CPTM São Paulo) in Santo André
- Paranapiacaba Station (CPTM São Paulo) in Paranapiacaba in Santo André
- Diretor Pestana station, in Porto Alegre. An old station formerly used in a passenger train line from Porto Alegre to Santa Maria, and currently only cargo trains pass through it in service, while metropolitan trains operated by the Trensurb line only pass there while maneuvering. Aeroporto station of the Trensurb, serving Porto Alegre airport, was built right beside the Diretor Pestana station.

=== Bulgaria ===
- St. Naum Station (Станция Свети Наум) and NDK Station (Станция НДК) of the Sofia Metro. Both stations were built in the 1980s, together with the National Palace of Culture and the redevelopment of the surrounding area. Currently these stations are fully completed and had become operational on 31 August 2012. St. Naum Station is operating under the name of European Union Metro Station.
- Moderno Predgradie Station (Станция Модерно предградие). Now Pancho Vladigerov station (Станция Панчо Владигеров), which is under construction and will open sometime in 2026

=== Canada ===
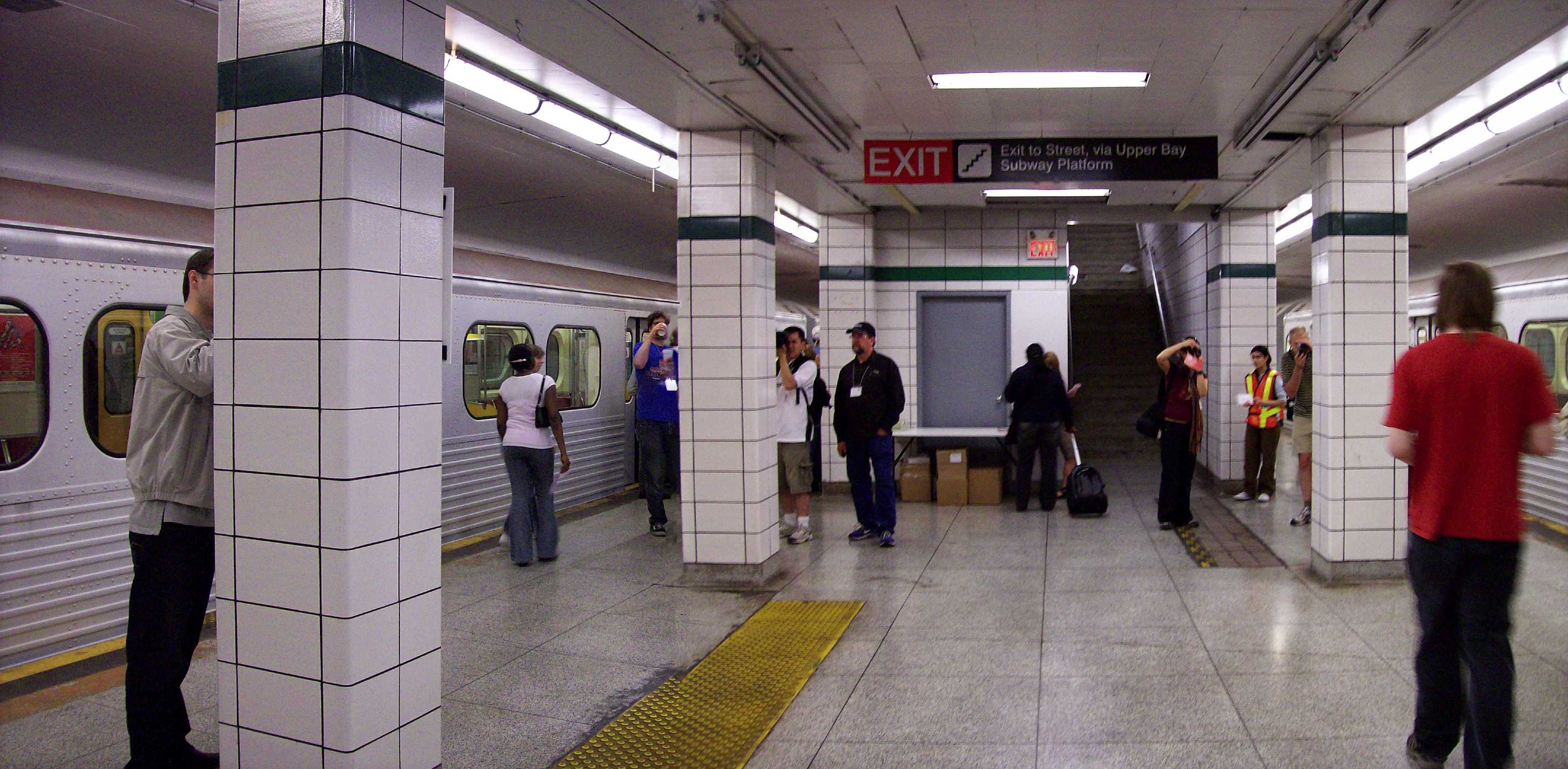
Lower Bay, Toronto, opened during a limited tour

- Lower Bay in Toronto. Below the main platform for Bay station is an abandoned level which was used for only six months in 1966 when the Toronto Transit Commission (TTC) experimentally interlined portions of both the Yonge–University and Bloor–Danforth lines. This abandoned platform is sometimes referred to as "Lower Bay" by the general public or "Bay Lower" by the TTC.
- Municipal Building in Calgary. A downtown subway was originally planned under 8th Avenue for the Calgary C-Train. In preparation, a short section of tunnel and underground LRT station were built under the Calgary Municipal Building when it was constructed in 1985. Subway plans were halted because the initial surface line on 7th Avenue turned out to have much more passenger capacity than expected. The underground station and downtown subway may be completed in the foreseeable future as future C-Train lines which are under construction and proposed will exceed the capacity of the 7th Avenue surface line.
- Edmonton LRT. An underground LRT station was built between Stadium and Churchill stations as a proposed future light rail station. There is concrete poured to form two elevator shafts and part of the platform. There are concrete walls that block stairs that go to the Edmonton Remand Centre and to the Edmonton Law Courts.

=== Chile ===
- Libertad station, located between Cumming and Quinta Normal in Line 5 of the Santiago Metro, is a ghost station that was never opened because of insufficient passenger demand for the station due to the low density of people traveling around and through it.
- Echeverría is a ghost station located in Line 4A, also closed because of the low density of people traveling around and through it.
- The original project of the line 3 side of Puente Cal y Canto metro station is also a ghost station. The entire line 3 was canceled because of the 1985 Algarrobo earthquake.

=== China ===
- The western section of Line 1 of the Beijing Subway, Fushouling and Station 53 (Gaojing), has not yet been opened to the public. Fushouling station is under renovation and will open to the public in 2026 or 2027.
- Xinhualu station was the former terminus of Line 1 of the Tianjin Metro. After Line 1 was shut down for renovation in 2001, the station was permanently closed. It was the first subway station in Chinese history to be permanently closed. The surface entrance has been demolished, and it can only be accessed via the track. Xinhualu station will be renovated and reopen to public in future. Line 1 also have a relocated station Yingkoudao, which relocated to the east side of now-abandoned former station.
- On Line 7 of the Shenzhen Metro, there are two stations that have not been opened to the public. They are Wenti Park station and Fulin station. Fulin station was initially opposed by most of the surrounding residents during construction, so it was reserved for the development of the Lok Ma Chau Loop area. Currently, all trains on Line 7 can only pass through Fulin station without stopping. Although Wenti Park station has been fully built, it is currently only open to internal subway employees commuting to the Shenyun depot and has not yet been opened to the public. The opening date is yet to be determined.

=== Denmark ===
- Ellebjerg station is a former surface station on Køgebugtbanen (line A), which is a part of the S-train network in Copenhagen. The station was closed in 2007 when the Ny Ellebjerg station ("New Ellebjerg station") was built when Ringbanen (line F) was extended, with connections between these two lines.

=== Finland ===
- The Kamppi metro station has an unused north–south station, below and at right angles to the east–west one currently in use. Excavated at the same time as the east–west station, it was never outfitted, because the corresponding north–south metro line was never built.
- The Hakaniemi metro station has another similar ghost station, built for the U-line which was eventually not constructed, and its excavation remains incomplete. They have no trains and are not accessible.
- The University of Helsinki metro station is a former ghost station, since it was excavated in the late 1970s, but opened to the public in 1995.
- Under Munkkivuori Shopping Centre in Helsinki is an unfinished space for Helsinki Metro station. The space was reserved during expansion work of the shopping centre in early 60s but never used.

=== France ===
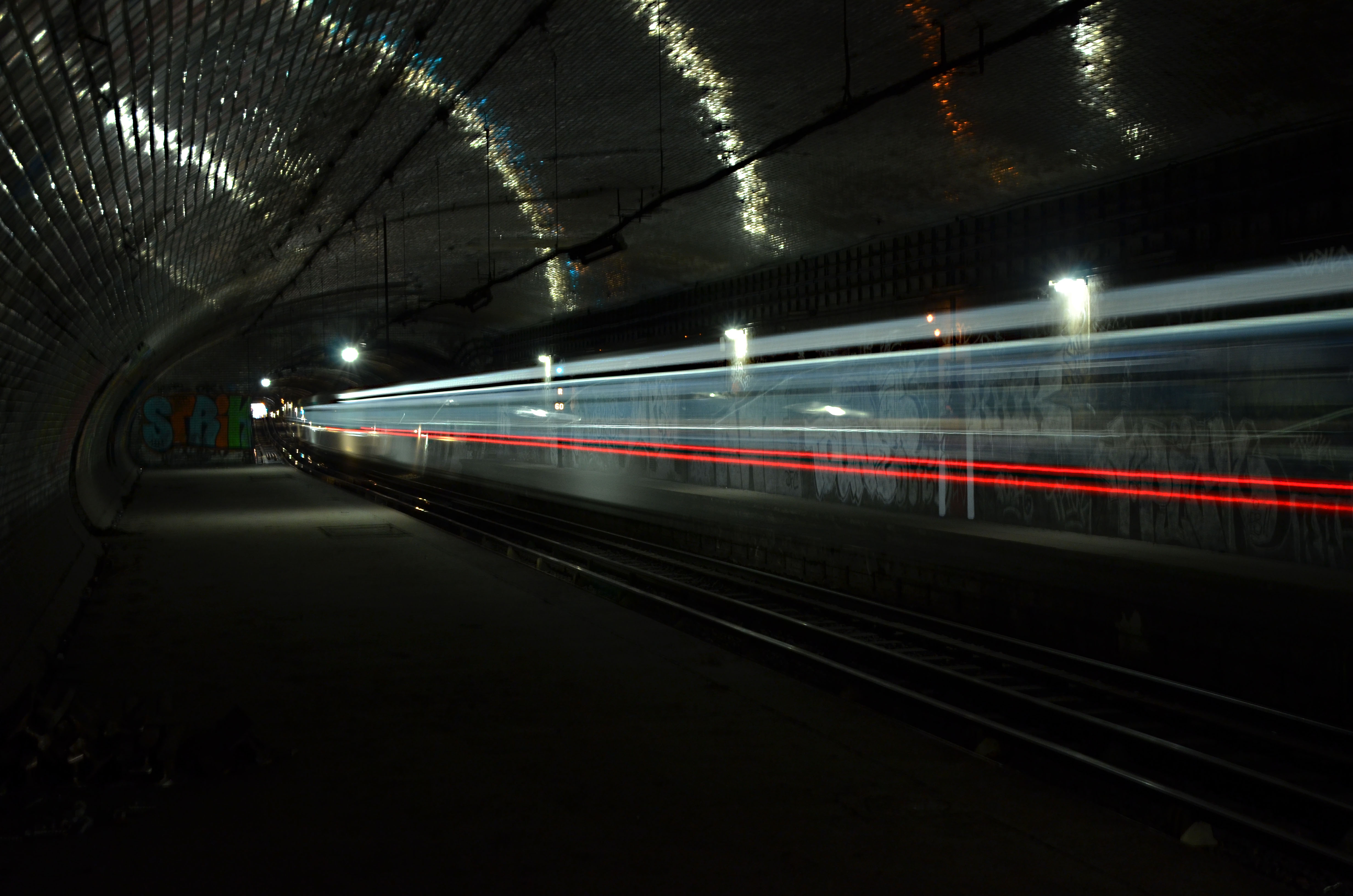
Champ de Mars, closed 1939

- Arsenal (Paris Métro)
- Champ de Mars (Paris Métro)
- Croix-Rouge (Paris Métro)
- Haxo (Paris Métro) (never opened)
- Porte Molitor (Paris Métro) (never opened)
- Saint-Martin (Paris Métro)

=== Germany ===
Apart from Berlin (which also has provisions for future extensions that serve no current purpose):

- Duisburg Light Railway (Stadtbahn): station Angerbogen, built, but never opened
- Düsseldorf Rapid Transit (S-Bahn): station Kalkum closed since 1990 and Station Abflug E at Düsseldorf Airport since 1998
- Hamburg Underground Railway (U-Bahn): station Beimoor, built, but never opened; station Hellkamp on line U2 and station Hauptbahnhof Nord
- Hanover Light Railway (Stadtbahn): part of station Hauptbahnhof, built, but never opened
- Cologne Light Railway (Stadtbahn): station Fixheider Weg closed in 2003, Deutz/Messe Kölnarena, built, but never opened
- Ludwigshafen Tramway: tramway underground stations Danziger Platz and Rathaus (partially)
- Munich Rapid Transit (S-Bahn): München Olympiastadion station closed in 1988
- Nuremberg Ring Railway: stations Langwasser and Zollhaus closed in 1992; the former station "Märzfeld" served the Nazi party rallying grounds and later deportations to the Nazi death camps. It can be visited in guided tours.
- Nuremberg U-Bahn: minor provisions made for a future infill station between Flughafen station and Ziegelstein station; there is an emergency exit near the proposed site of this tentative "Marienberg station"
- Altenburg-Rheinau, located in Baden-Württemberg but on a line owned and operated by Swiss Federal Railways, closed in 2010 due to low passenger frequency

On some German high speed lines there are provisions made at overtaking stations (which serve an important function for operating trains, but do not appear obvious to most passengers as having any purpose) to allow for (conversion to) passenger service more easily in the future. In some cases this is as little as leaving more space between tracks to allow for the future construction of platforms, while in others there are significant parts of a passenger station constructed before the decision to not serve it after all is made. An example that has attracted particular public debate regarding the feasibility and desirability of passenger service is Ilmenau-Wolfsberg service station in a forest near Ilmenau along the Nuremberg–Erfurt high-speed railway.

=== Hong Kong ===
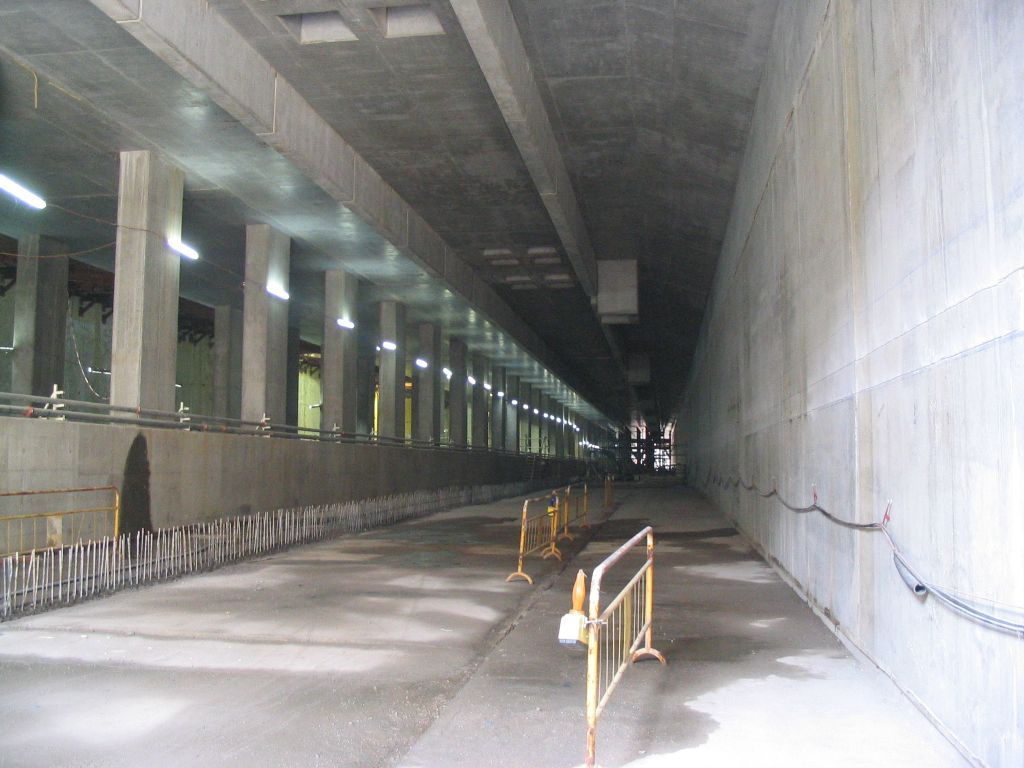
Area reserved for Kwu Tung station's platform

- Rumsey station in the MTR. This platform was originally reserved for the East Kowloon line proposal in the 1970s, in order to minimise the effects on the Island line. However, these platforms are now abandoned and brick walls have been placed at the two ends of the 60 m (200 ft) long platforms to block them off. The station is now merged into Sheung Wan and formerly served as the terminus of the Island line before the opening of West Island line. Since the platforms were built as the upper platforms, and the proposed Rumsey station concourse was redeveloped as east concourse of Sheung Wan station, passengers going to and from exit E (proposed exit for Rumsey station) must pass through the abandoned platforms. In preparation for the opening of the West Island line extension the station was renovated, and the track area along the platforms was walled off.
- A ghost station, Kwu Tung exists on the Lok Ma Chau Spur Line of the East Rail line. Currently, the station only has an underground station box structure and a ventilation shaft. Construction of the station resumed in 2023 and the station will start operations in 2027.

=== Indonesia ===
Indonesia has some ghost stations like Gunung Putri railway station.

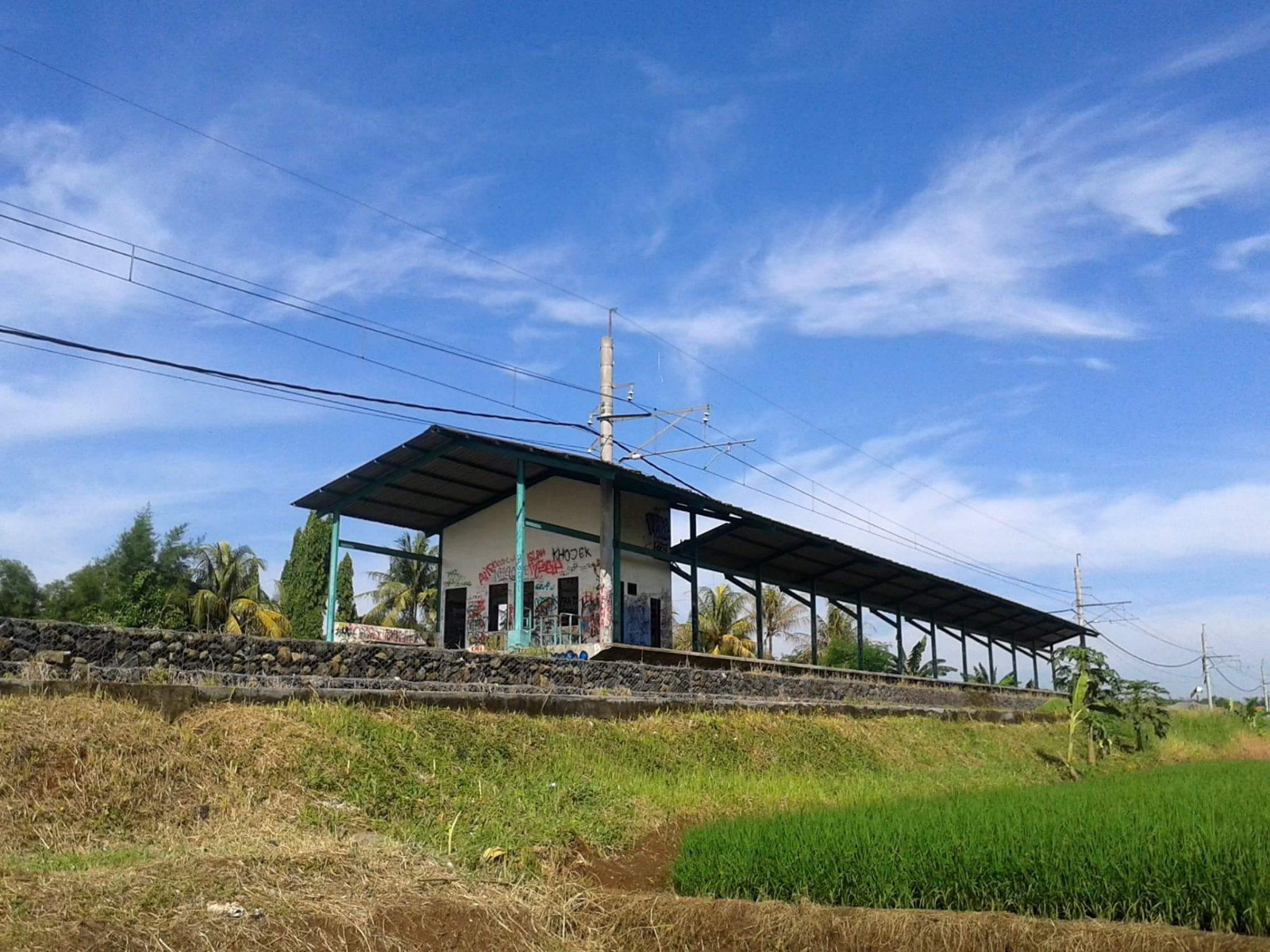
Formerly abandoned Pondok Rajeg station, re-opened on 19 October 2024, photo was taken on 10 June 2016.

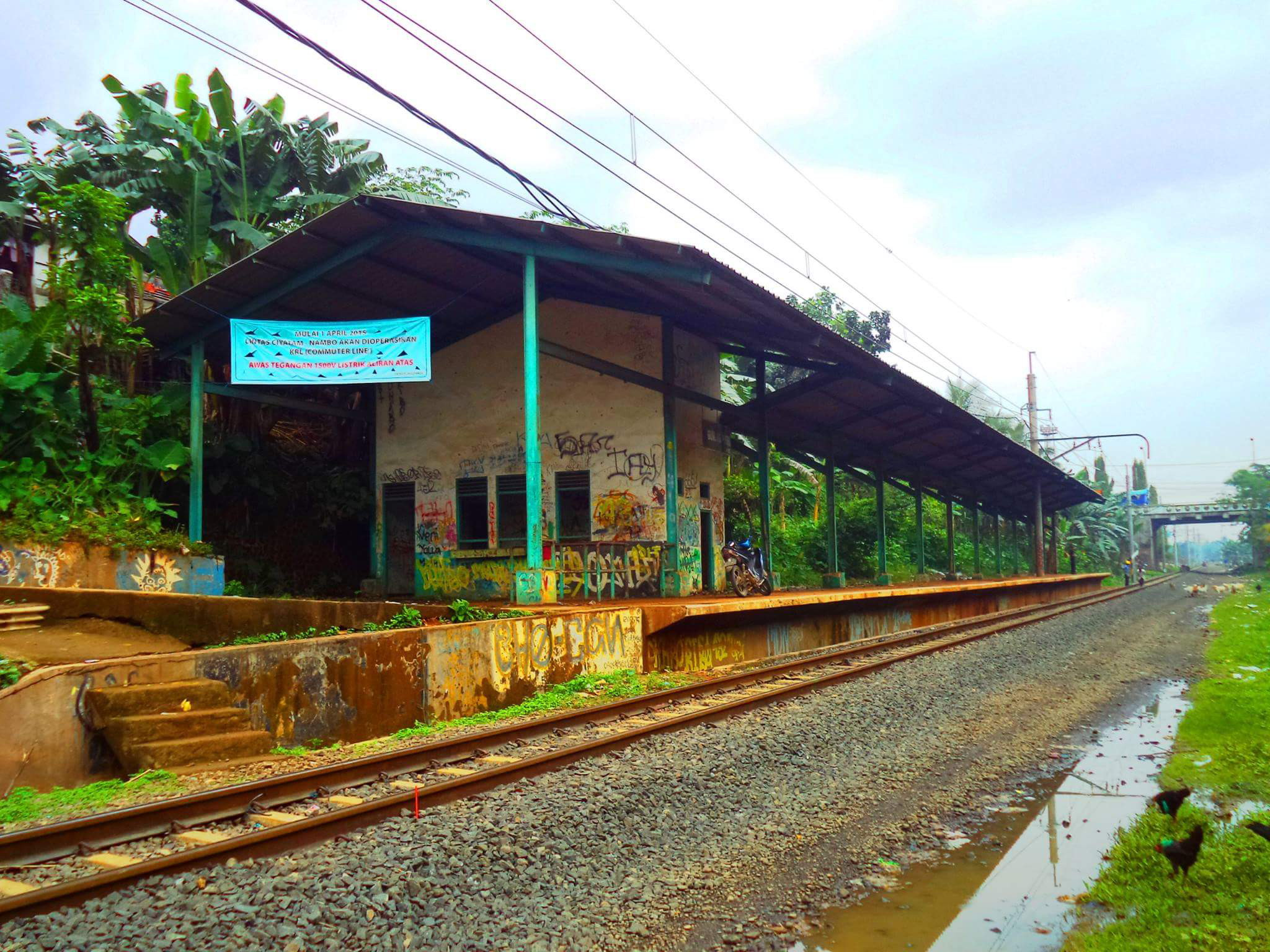
Abandoned Gunung Putri station, photo was taken on 20 March 2015.

=== Ireland ===
Brennanstown station exists on the Green Line of the Luas tram system in Dublin, between Ballyogan Wood and Carrickmines. It was intended to service new suburbs, but, the post-2008 Irish economic downturn meant that the suburbs were never built and the tram passes through empty fields at that point on the line. The station is labelled "Future Stop" on the route map.

=== Israel ===
Rosh HaAyin South railway station became a ghost station on Israel Railways network in 2003, when the line it served as a terminus was extended towards Kfar Saba–Nordau railway station, and a new station, serving Rosh HaAyin was built a couple of kilometers to the north.

=== Italy ===
Italy does not have a long list of ghost stations. Amongst the few examples is Quintiliani, on Line B of the Rome Metro. It was built in 1990 as part of the extension towards the northeast of Line B, but was kept unused because it was meant to serve a planned business district called Sistema Direzionale Orientale (Eastern Directional District) that was never realized.

In the early 2000s the project of the S.D.O. was cancelled and the station, which was in the middle of nowhere, was taken in charge by the Municipality of Rome and renewed to make it compliant with the new security rules issued in the meantime; a new bus line was established to link the station to the nearby Sandro Pertini general hospital. On 23 June 2003 it was officially opened to passenger traffic, ending a 13-year long period of ghost station status.

=== Japan ===
- Hakubutsukan Dōbutsuen station on the Keisei Main Line (closed in 2004)
- Kaede station on the JR Hokkaido Sekishō Line (closed in 2004)
- Manseibashi station on the Tokyo Metro Ginza Line (closed in 1931)

There are two "ghost stations" in the Seikan tunnel (Tappi-Kaitei Station & Yoshioka-Kaitei Station) which lost all remaining passenger service in the course of the construction of the Hokkaido Shinkansen.

=== Liechtenstein ===
- Schaanwald station on Liechtenstein's only railway line, the Feldkirch–Buchs railway, was closed in 2013

=== Malaysia ===
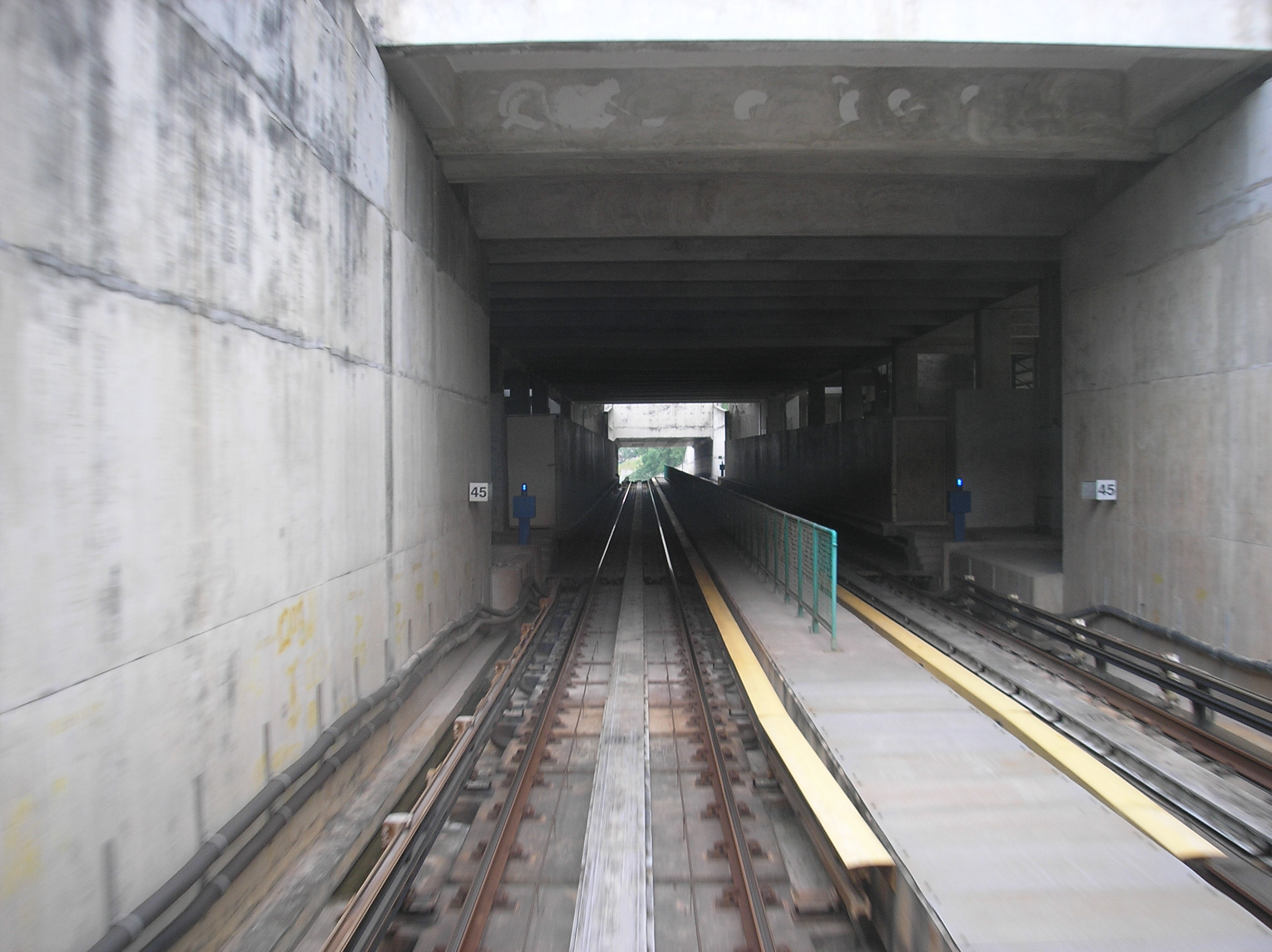
Sri Rampai in 2007, in an unfinished state since 1999. The station was completed and opened in 2010.

- Rantau Panjang railway station is a partially disused railway station owned by Keretapi Tanah Melayu (KTM) which is a part of the Rantau Panjang extension of KTM Intercity's East Coast Line in Rantau Panjang, Kelantan. After DMU drivers from Thailand refused to stop their railcars between Rantau Panjang and Tumpat, it is reused by Eastern & Oriental Express trains as a railway station for emergency purposes.
- Sri Rampai station on the PUTRA LRT/Kelana Jaya line in Kuala Lumpur. Partially completed during construction between 1994 and 1999 but remaining inactive and mothballed for a decade after the opening of the line, as ridership via the station was initially projected to be too low. Completed and opened in December 2010 following new property developments around the station.

=== New Zealand ===
- Helensville railway station on Auckland's Northern Line closed in 2009
- Kumeu railway station on Auckland's Northern Line, a temporary stop in 2008 and 2009
- Waimauku railway station on Auckland's Northern Line closed in 2009
- Waitakere railway station with electrification terminating at Swanson, this station has closed (2014)

=== North Korea ===
- Pyongyang Metro – Kwangmyŏng station (Korean: 광명) has been closed since 1995 when the mausoleum of Kim Il-Sung was opened atop that station.

=== Norway ===
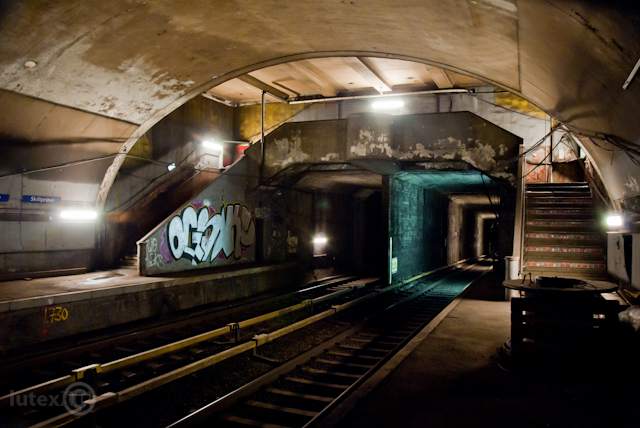
Valkyrie plass, closed 1985

- Valkyrie plass on the Oslo Metro
- Volvat on the Oslo Metro
- Elisenberg in the Oslo Tunnel

All three are real ghost stations, underground stations with trains passing through.

=== Russia ===
==== Moscow Metro ====
- Pervomayskaya (depot) and Kaluzhskaya (depot): Temporary stations built in the respective metro depots. After the lines they were serving were extended and proper stations built, these were closed.

==== Saint Petersburg Metro ====
- Dachnoye, a bay platform opened in 1966, closed in 1977, a part of the platform was rebuilt as a police building.

==== Nizhny Novgorod Metro ====
- Yarmarka, located between the Moskovskaya and Strelka stations. Its construction was started in 1993, but was discontinued in 1996. At first, in this station there was a headshunt for trains. After the opening of the Strelka station you can see the branch and expansion of the tunnel for the station. Presumably this station will be completed after 2020.

=== Singapore ===
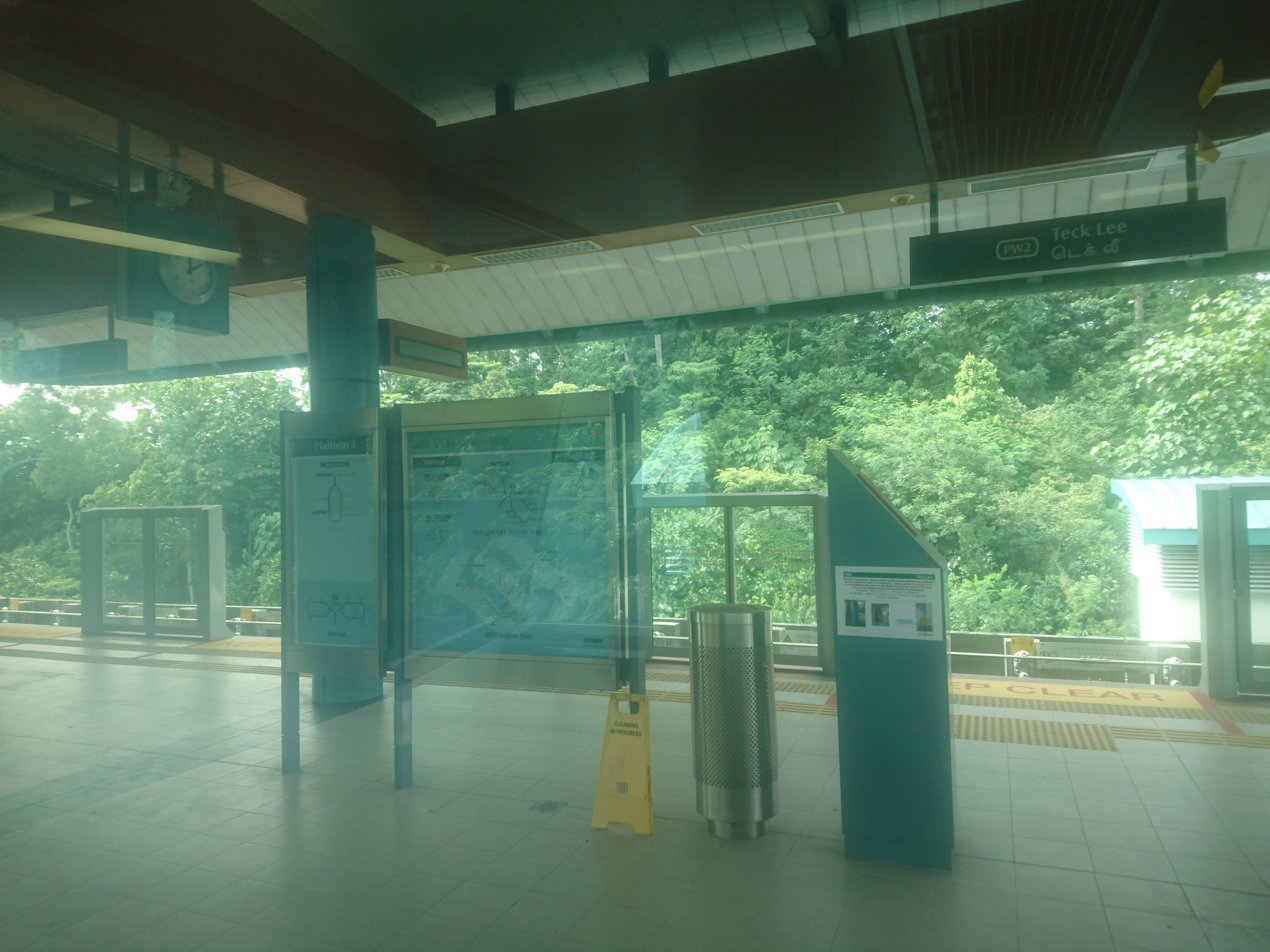
View of Teck Lee LRT station in 2019

- Bukit Brown is an unopened station along the Circle line. It is currently only a shell station with only a ventilation shaft. It is located on top of Bukit Brown Chinese Cemetery and Jalan Mashhor, an abandoned road. SMRT, the operator of the Circle Line, is currently reviewing the possibilities to open the station, however, and it should be open in the future. Hume station is also a ventilation shaft, but opened as a fully-operational station on 28 February 2025.
- Currently, Mount Pleasant and Marina South are also ghost stations, to be opened in tandem with housing estates in the area. A shell station called Tagore also exists between Springleaf and Lentor station, and will open along with surrounding developments.
- Several stations on the Punggol LRT, including the entire West Loop, did not open with the rest of the line in 2005. All of these stations have since opened for service alongside developments in their respective areas. The last station to open, which was Teck Lee, opened on 15 August 2024, nearly two decades since the line began operations.
- Ten Mile Junction station on the Bukit Panjang LRT opened in November 1999, and was permanently closed on 13 January 2019, to facilitate upgrading works for the line. The station was previously closed from late 2010 to early 2012 for refurbishment works.
- Founders' Memorial station is currently a ghost station with Mount Pleasant and Marina South MRT station stations on the same line network. It would open together with the upcoming Founders' Memorial attraction, which the station was named after.

=== South Korea ===
- A second platform for Seoul Subway Line 2 at Sinseol-dong station

=== Spain ===
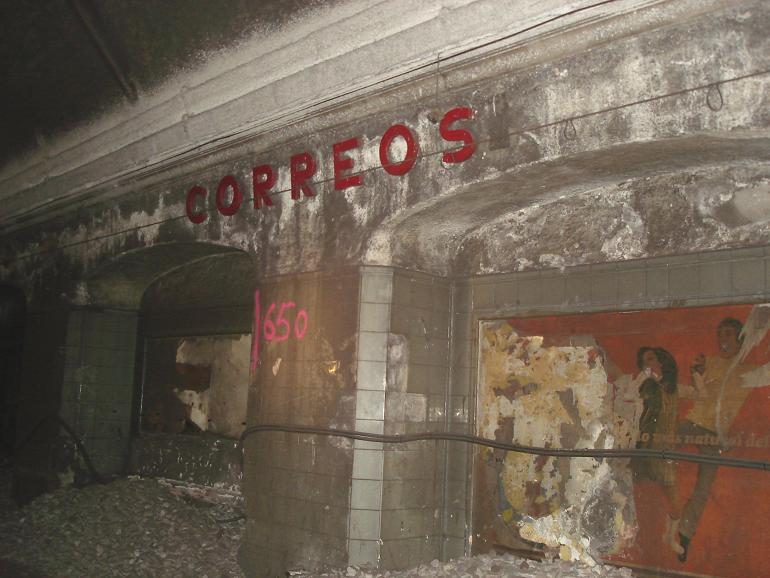
Correos on the Barcelona Metro, closed 1972

- Disused Barcelona Metro stations
- Chamberí on Line 1 of Madrid Metro – one of the first stations to open, it was closed after train and platform lengths increased to such a degree that the distance from it to the neighboring stations was deemed too short. It is now a museum.
- El Tejar, San Martín de la Vega, Parque de Ocio, Dos Castillas, Vaquerizas, Cercedilla Pueblo, Las Heras, Camorritos, Siete Picos and Collado Albo in Cercanías Madrid
- Mercat Central on Line 10 of Metrovalencia was the only completed station on the section planned, but later abandoned, from Alacant to Tavernes Blanques.

=== Sweden ===
- Korpmossevägen on the Stockholm Metro (abandoned when the line was converted from tram to metro operation; it's not underground)
- Kymlinge on the Stockholm Metro (never finished; partly underground)
- Rannebergen in Gothenburg (prepared underground station not used by trains)
- Traneberg on the Stockholm Metro (abandoned when the line was converted from tram to metro operation, demolished in the early 2000s. Not underground)

=== Switzerland ===
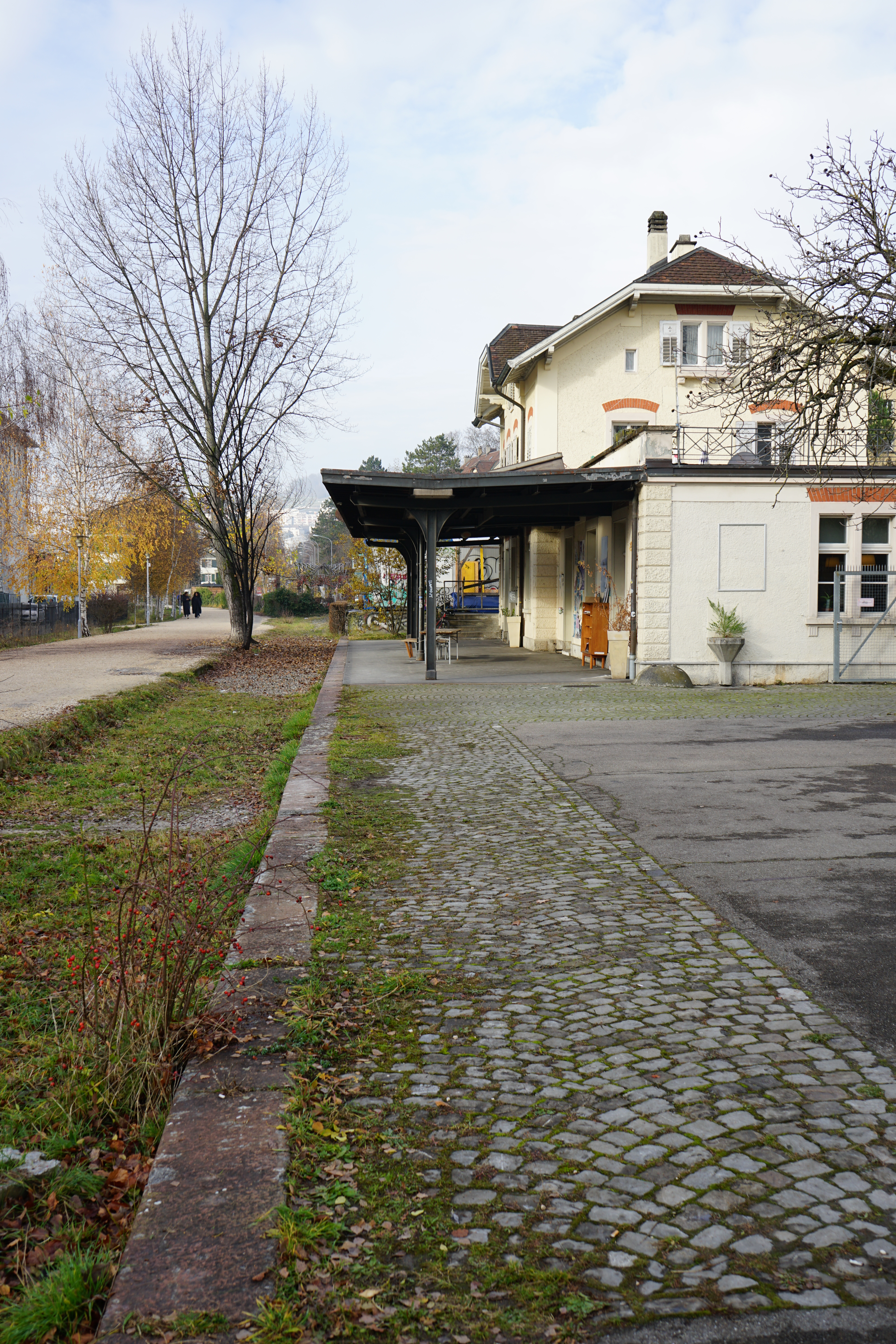
Zurich Letten station building in 2020

- Algetshausen-Henau, closed in 2013 with the opening of the St. Gallen S-Bahn system
- Bollingen, closed in 2004 due to low passenger frequency and after the opening of another railway station nearby
- Därligen, closed in 2020, with services being replaced by a bus line
- Faulensee, closed in 2020, with services being replaced by a bus line
- Grandgourt, closed in 2022
- Le Lussex, closed in 2020
- Leissigen, closed in 2020 with services replaced by a bus line,
- Lenzburg Stadt, closed in 1984, station building demolished in 2003
- Ligerz, closed in 2024 due to the construction of a tunnel, service replaced by a bus line
- Mols, closed in 2021, served ever since by a bus line
- Montétan, closed in 2021 due to the construction of a tunnel
- Sassal, closed in ca. 2000 due to the danger of falling rocks, low passenger numbers, and problems getting on and off trains at this location
- Sattel-Aegeri, closed in 2023 after the construction of another station nearby
- Schwarzenbach, closed in 2013 with the opening of the St. Gallen S-Bahn system
- Sihlbrugg, closed in 2012
- Vaumarcus, closed in 2024
- Vevey-Funi, closed in 2024, services replaced by a rush-hour bus line
- Weesen refers to two railway stations, one of which was closed in 1969 and the other one in 2013 with the opening of the St. Gallen S-Bahn system, shortly reopened during the ESAF 2025
- Yverdon-Champ Pittet, closed in 2024
- Zürich Letten, closed in 1989 with the opening of the Zurich S-Bahn system, for which a new tunnel was built and which resulted in the closing of the line to Letten station. Its former railway yard became the site of a drug scene during the early 1990s after the closure of the nearby Platzspitz park

=== Turkey ===
Terminal 2 in Istanbul Metro Built for Istanbul Airport Terminal 2 but currently closed and waiting the opening of Terminal 2.

=== Ukraine ===
- Vulytsia Hertsena, Lvivska Brama and Telychka in the Kyiv Metro
- Vovnopriadylna in the Kryvyi Rih Metrotram

=== United Kingdom ===
- List of former and unopened London Underground stations
- Merkland Street on the Glasgow Subway, closed in 1977 as part of the system's modernisation and was replaced by Partick in 1980.
- King's Cross Thameslink, closed in 2007 and replaced by St Pancras Thameslink.

=== United States ===
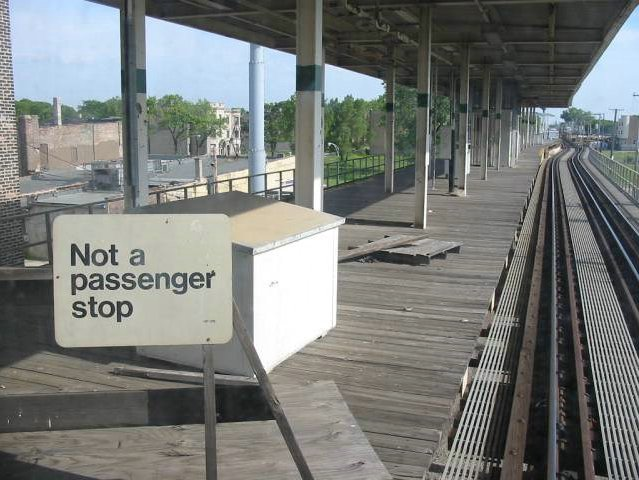
58th Street on the Chicago "L" Green Line

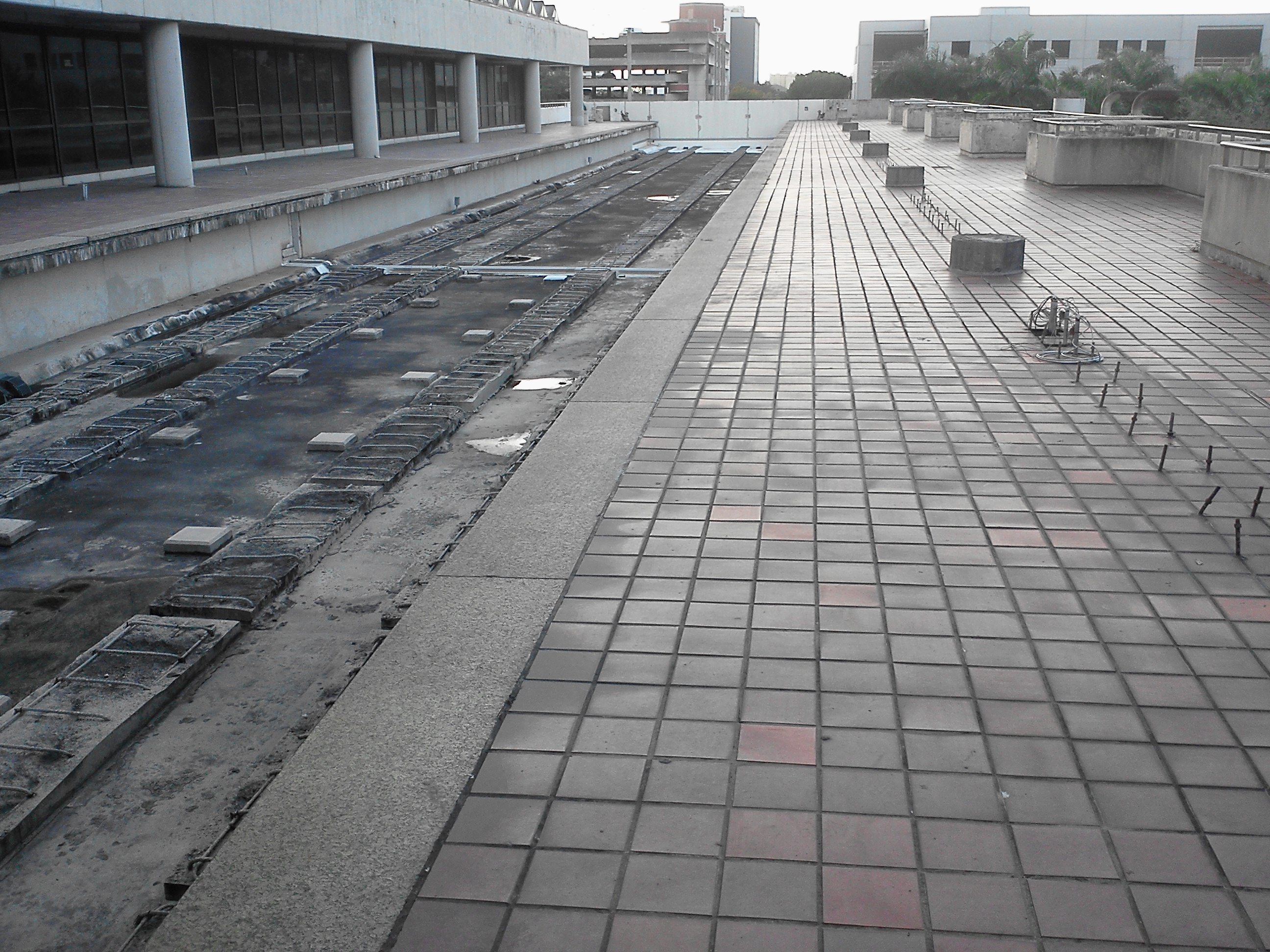
Ghost platform at Government Center Metrorail station, Miami

- Euclid–East 120th on the RTA Rapid Transit in Cleveland
- Nine stations on the New York City Subway, as well as two stations on the PATH system
- Woodhaven Junction on the Atlantic Branch of the LIRR
- Spring Garden on the Broad-Ridge Spur in Philadelphia
- Six stations on the Chicago "L"
- Three stations on the VTA light rail system in San Jose, as well as Eureka Valley in San Francisco
- The unused east–west platform at Government Center Station on the Metrorail in Miami
- Harvard-Holyoke near Boston
- The former platforms of the Gateway station in Pittsburgh
- Race Street station in the Cincinnati Subway
- 29th & Welton in Denver
- Subway Terminal Building in Los Angeles contains an abandoned station in the basement with its terminus at Belmont Tunnel/Toluca Substation and Yard. The tunnel was bisected by new construction in the early 21st century.
- Four stations on TriMet MAX Light Rail Blue and Red Lines in Portland, Oregon

== See also ==
- Abandoned railway station
