= Französische Straße station =

Former railway station in Berlin, Germany

Coordinates: 52°30′53″N 13°23′21″E

Französische Straße
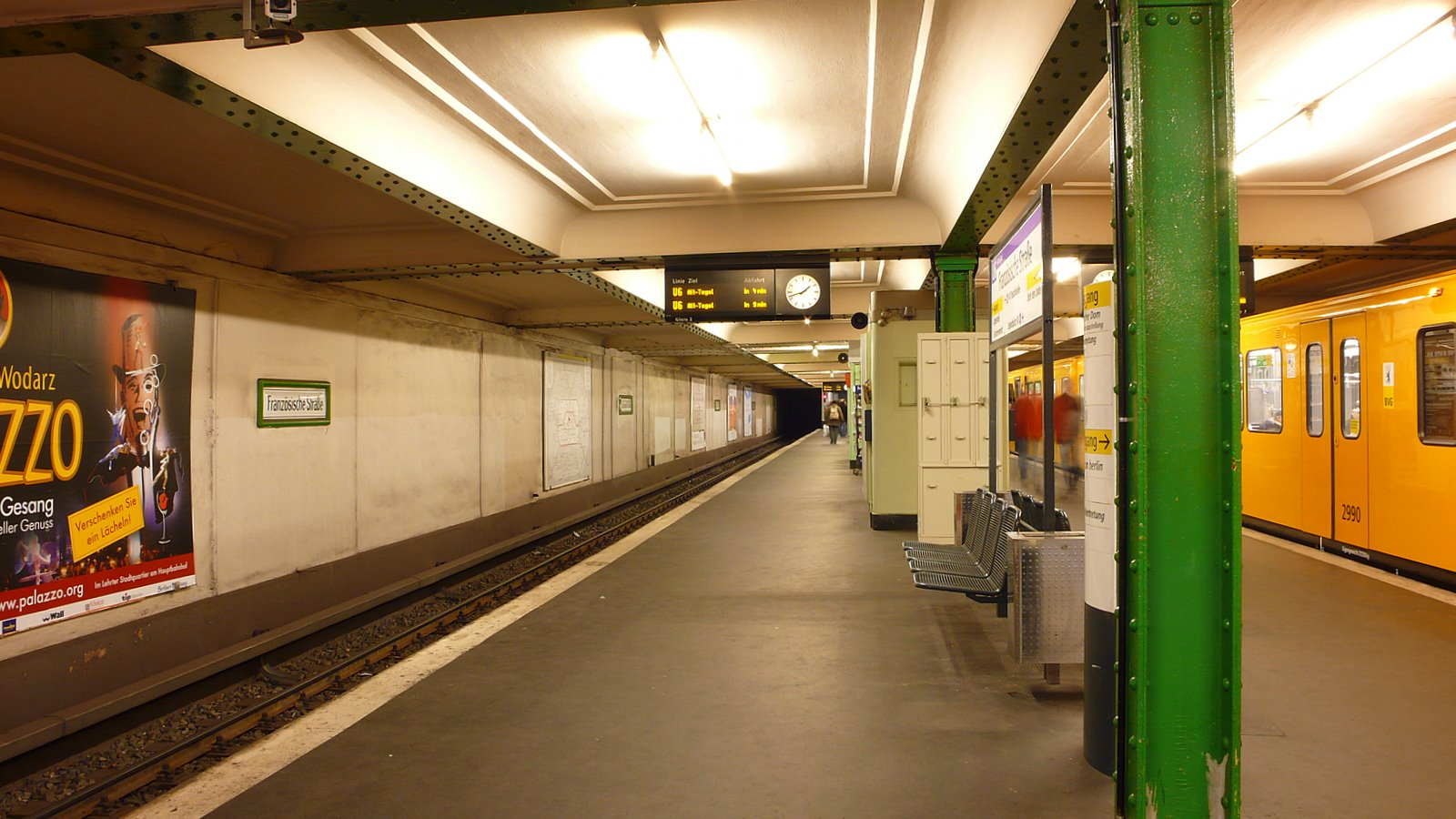
- Platform view of Französische Straße in 2011, prior to being closed for a second time

General information
- Location: Mitte
- Owner: Berliner Verkehrsbetriebe
- Operator: Berliner Verkehrsbetriebe
- Platforms: 1 island platform
- Tracks: 2
- Train operators: Berliner Verkehrsbetriebe

Other information
- Fare zone: VBB: Berlin A/5555

History
- Opened: 30 January 1923; 103 years ago
- Closed: 3 December 2020; 5 years ago

Services
Preceding station	Berlin U-Bahn	Following station
Former service
Friedrichstraße towards Alt-Tegel	U6	Stadtmitte towards Alt-Mariendorf
Location

Französische Straße was a Berlin U-Bahn underground station on the U6 line located under the street Friedrichstraße in central Berlin.

This station was built by Grenander/Fehse/Jennen and opened in 1923. In 1945 it closed for a few months; it was closed in 1961 at the start of the (1961–1990) Cold War, becoming a ghost station; the underground trains of the West Berlin BVG passed the island platform in East Berlin slowly without stopping. In 1990, after the Berlin Wall fell, the station reopened. In 1995, the platform had to be lengthened by 25 m (82 ft) to accommodate the longer six-car trains.

== 2020 closure ==
With the opening of the expanded U5 line connecting Alexanderplatz with Berlin Hauptbahnhof, Französische Straße station was closed and replaced by the newly built Unter den Linden station directly to the north, allowing transfers between the U6 and U5 lines. The last trains called at Französische Straße on 3 December 2020, and Unter den Linden station opened the following day.
