= Spring Garden station (Broad–Ridge Spur) =

Rapid transit station in Philadelphia 1932–1989

Spring Garden
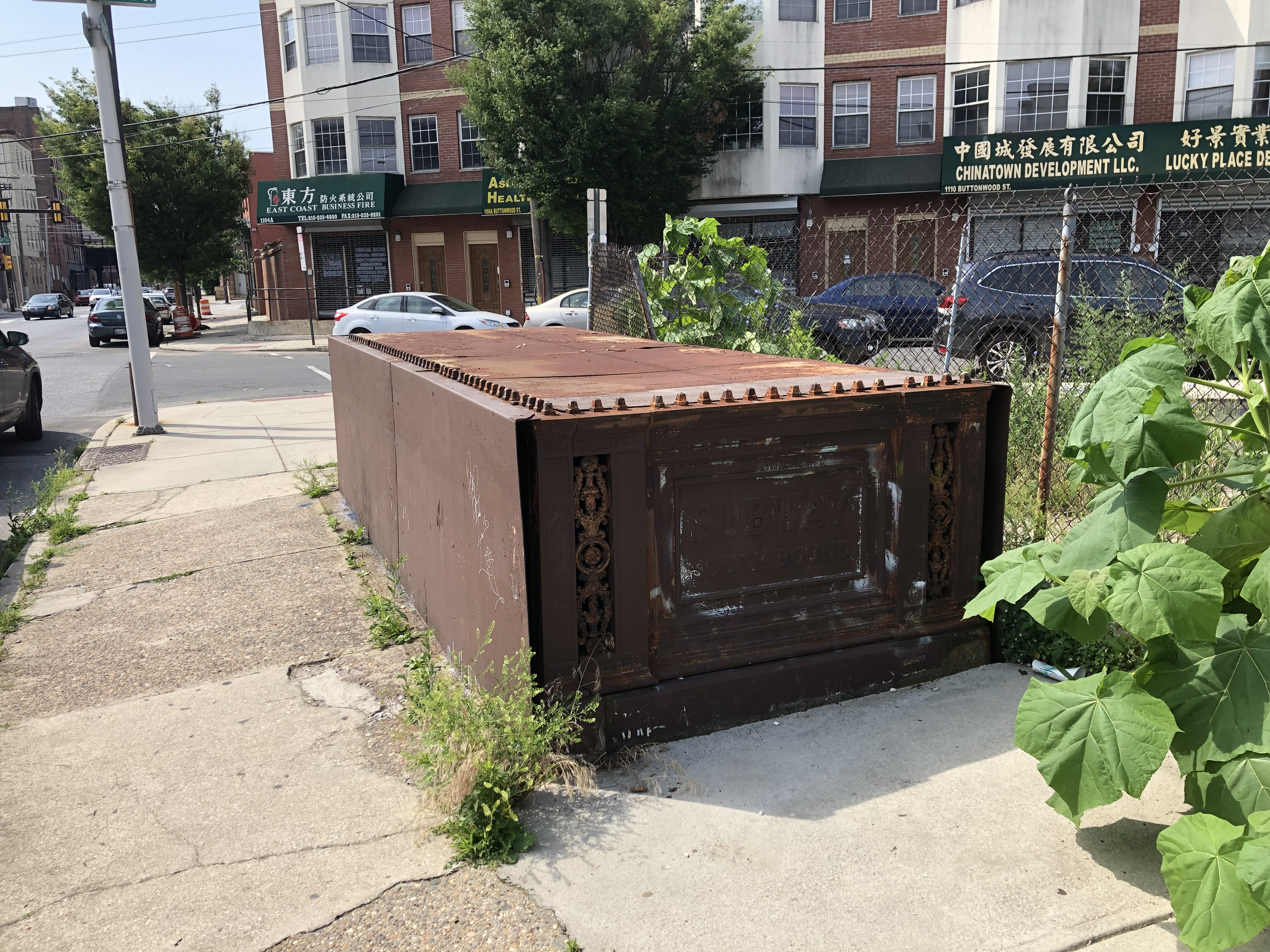
- A former entrance to Spring Garden station, seen in June 2019

General information
- Location: Spring Garden Street and Ridge Avenue; Philadelphia, Pennsylvania
- Coordinates: 39.9618°N 75.1579°W
- Platforms: 2 side platforms
- Tracks: 2

Construction
- Accessible: No

History
- Opened: December 21, 1932
- Closed: September 10, 1989

Former services
Preceding station	SEPTA	Following station
Chinatown toward 8th & Market	Broad–Ridge Spur	Fairmount toward Olney or Fern Rock
Location

Spring Garden station is an abandoned subway rapid transit station on the SEPTA Broad–Ridge Spur, located under Ridge Avenue between Spring Garden Street and Buttonwood Street.

The Broad-Ridge Spur, including Spring Garden station, opened on December 21, 1932. By the late 1980s, Spring Garden station was lightly used and exit-only; it was frequently occupied by drug users and dealers. After no substantial opposition from nearby residents, SEPTA closed the station on September 10, 1989. The now abandoned station, visible from passing trains, is heavily graffitied. A single entrance, covered with steel, is still present on the west side of Ridge Avenue just north of Buttonwood Street.
