= Nyanda railway station =

Former railway station in Brisbane, Australia

Nyanda
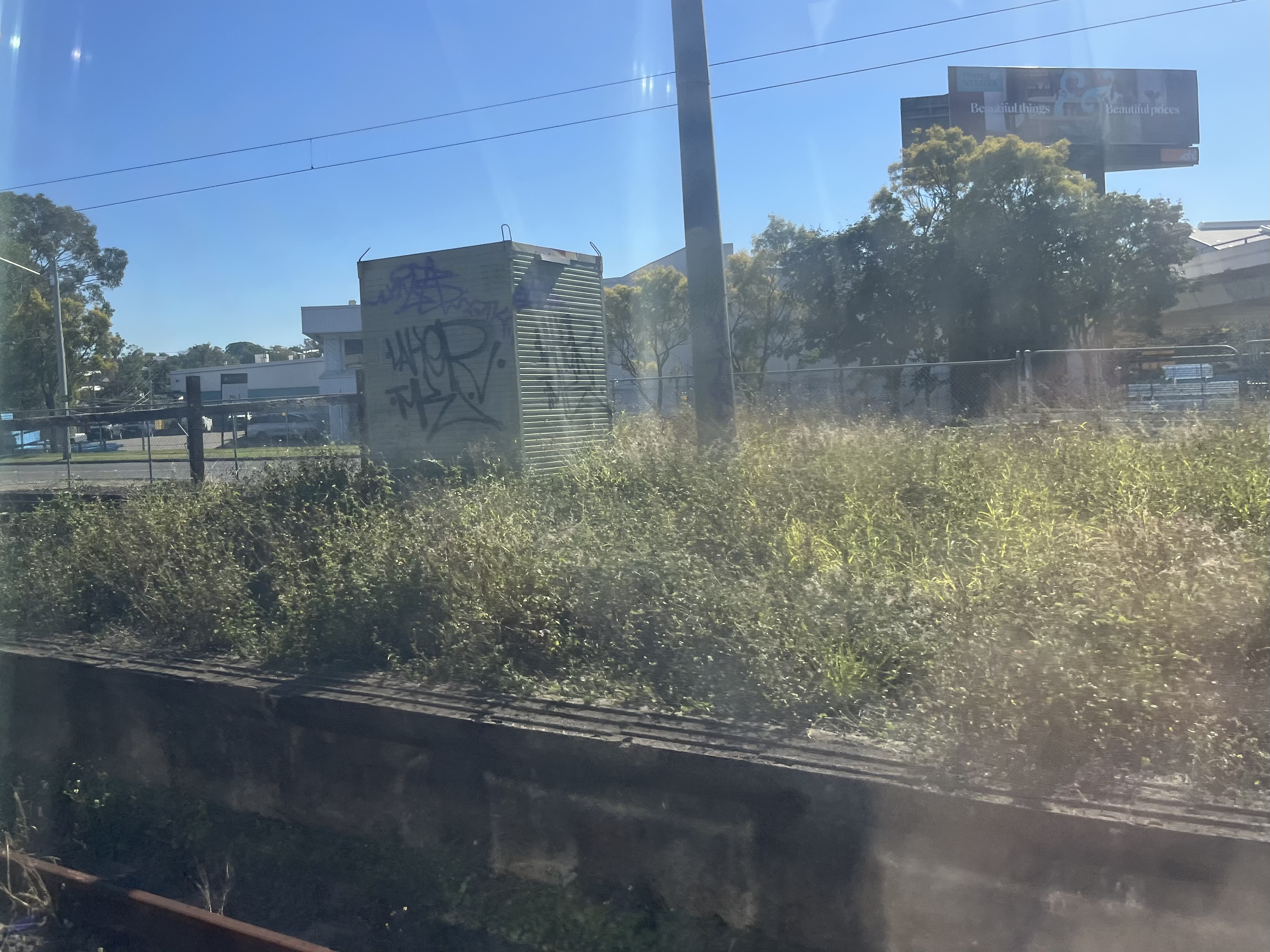
- Abandoned platforms in August 2026

General information
- Coordinates: 27°32′54″S 153°01′08″E
- Owner: Queensland Rail
- Operator: Queensland Rail
- Line: Beenleigh
- Platforms: 2 (1 island)

Construction
- Structure type: Ground

History
- Opened: 1885
- Closed: November 1978
- Former names: Nyanda Crossing
Location

Nyanda railway station is a closed railway station on the Beenleigh line in Queensland, Australia between Rocklea and Salisbury stations. It opened in 1885 as Nyanda Crossing and was positioned so one person could manage the station and attend to the Beaudesert Road level crossing. It became an unnamed stopping place for workers at the adjacent Evans Deakin and Company factory in 1940 and was renamed Nyanda in 1951.

In 1976, an overpass was constructed over the station.

Most platforms south of the Brisbane River were progressively lengthened in the late 1970s to accommodate SX sets and the new Electric Multiple Unit trains. The existing platform used up all the available space between Beaudesert Road and industrial sidings at the north end of the station and there was no room to extend it. As a result, the station closed in 1978 when the Merivale Bridge opened.
