= Springleaf MRT station =

Mass Rapid Transit station in Singapore

Springleaf TE4 春叶 ஸ்பிரிங்லீஃவ்
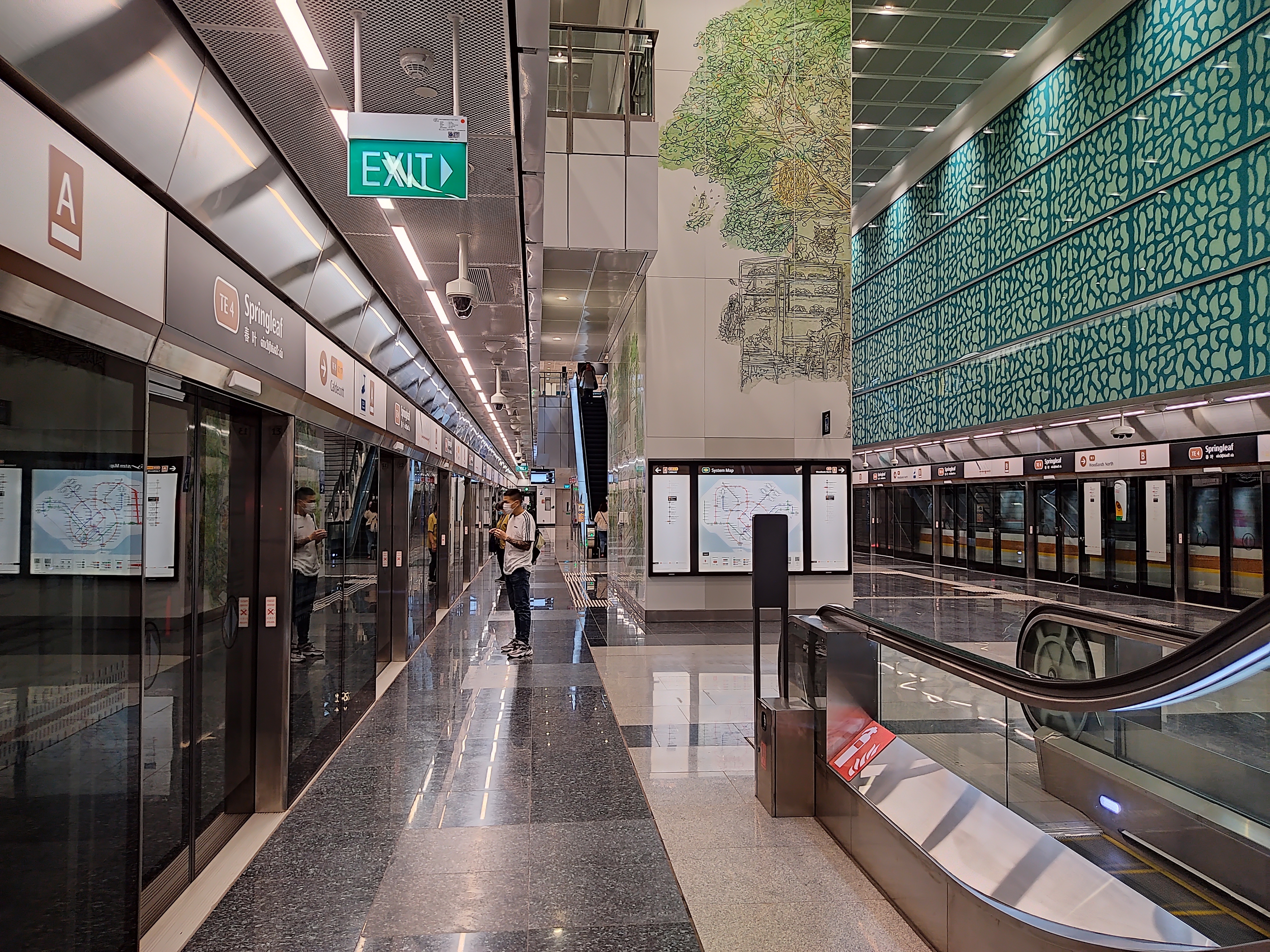
- Platform level of Springleaf station

General information
- Location: 825 Upper Thomson Road, Singapore 787140
- Coordinates: 01°23′52″N 103°49′06″E
- System: Mass Rapid Transit (MRT) station
- Owner: Land Transport Authority
- Operator: SMRT Trains
- Line: Thomson–East Coast Line
- Platforms: 2 (1 island platform)
- Tracks: 2
- Connections: Bus, Taxi

Construction
- Structure type: Underground
- Platform levels: 1
- Accessible: Yes

Other information
- Station code: SPL

History
- Opened: 28 August 2021; 5 years ago
- Former names: Nee Soon Village, Thong Soon

Passengers
- June 2024: 4,632 per day

Services
Preceding station	Mass Rapid Transit	Following station
Woodlands South towards Woodlands North	Thomson–East Coast Line	Lentor towards Bayshore
Track layout
Location
- Location within Singapore Rail

Springleaf MRT station is an underground Mass Rapid Transit (MRT) station on the Thomson–East Coast Line (TEL) in Yishun, Singapore. Situated along Upper Thomson Road, it serves the neighbourhood of Springleaf and the nearby Springleaf Nature Park. It will also serve future housing developments in the Springleaf area. The station is operated by SMRT Trains.

First announced in August 2012 as part of the Thomson Line (TSL), the station was constructed as part of TEL Phase 2 (TEL 2) after plans for the TSL and the Eastern Region Line (ERL) were merged. The station was built close to the shophouses along Upper Thomson Road. An earth retaining stabilising structure was installed to minimise ground movement. Along with the TEL 2 stations, Springleaf station opened on 28 August 2021 and features an Art-in-Transit artwork Tree of Memories by Koh Hong Teng.

== History ==
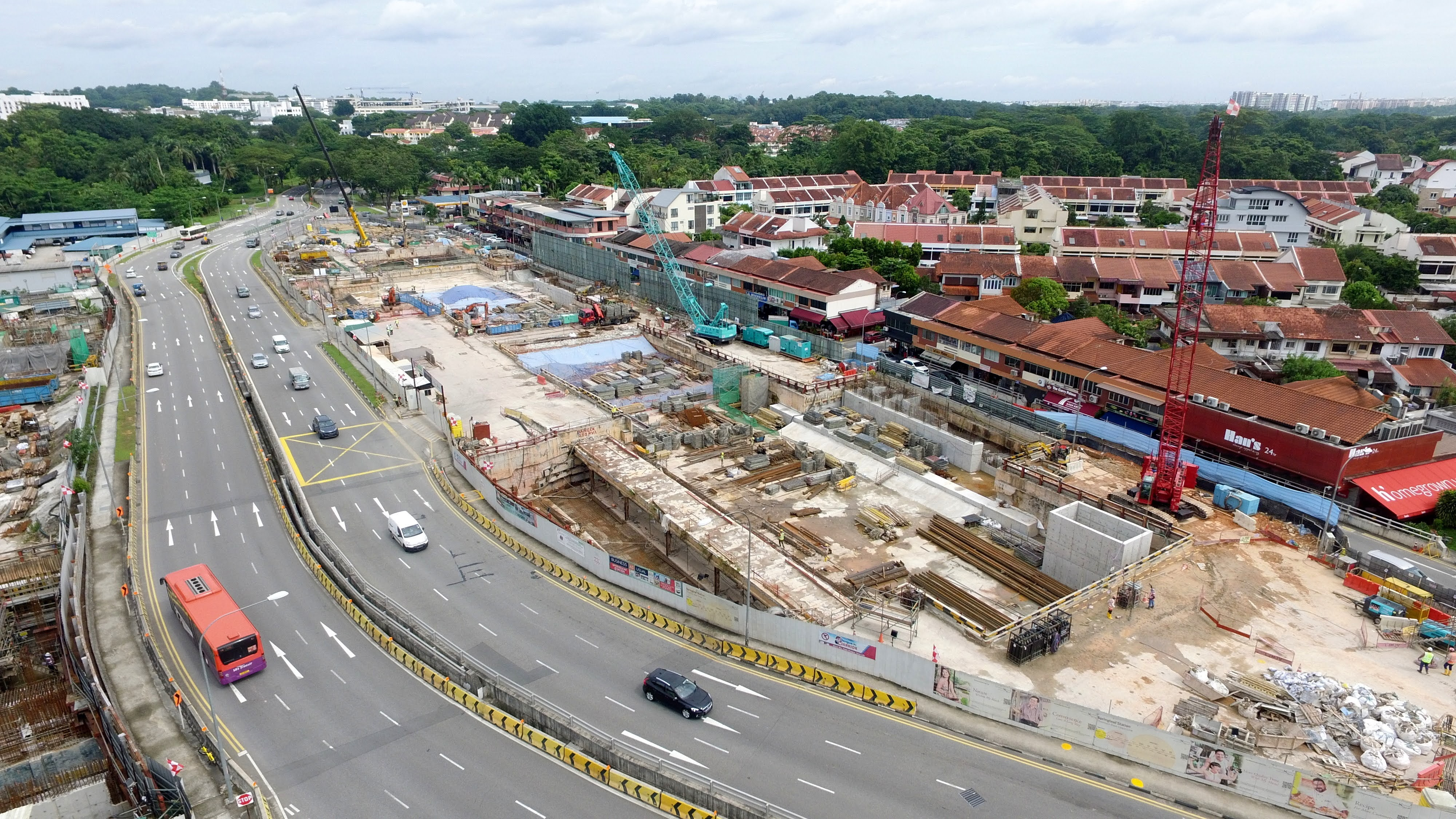
The station during its construction in 2018

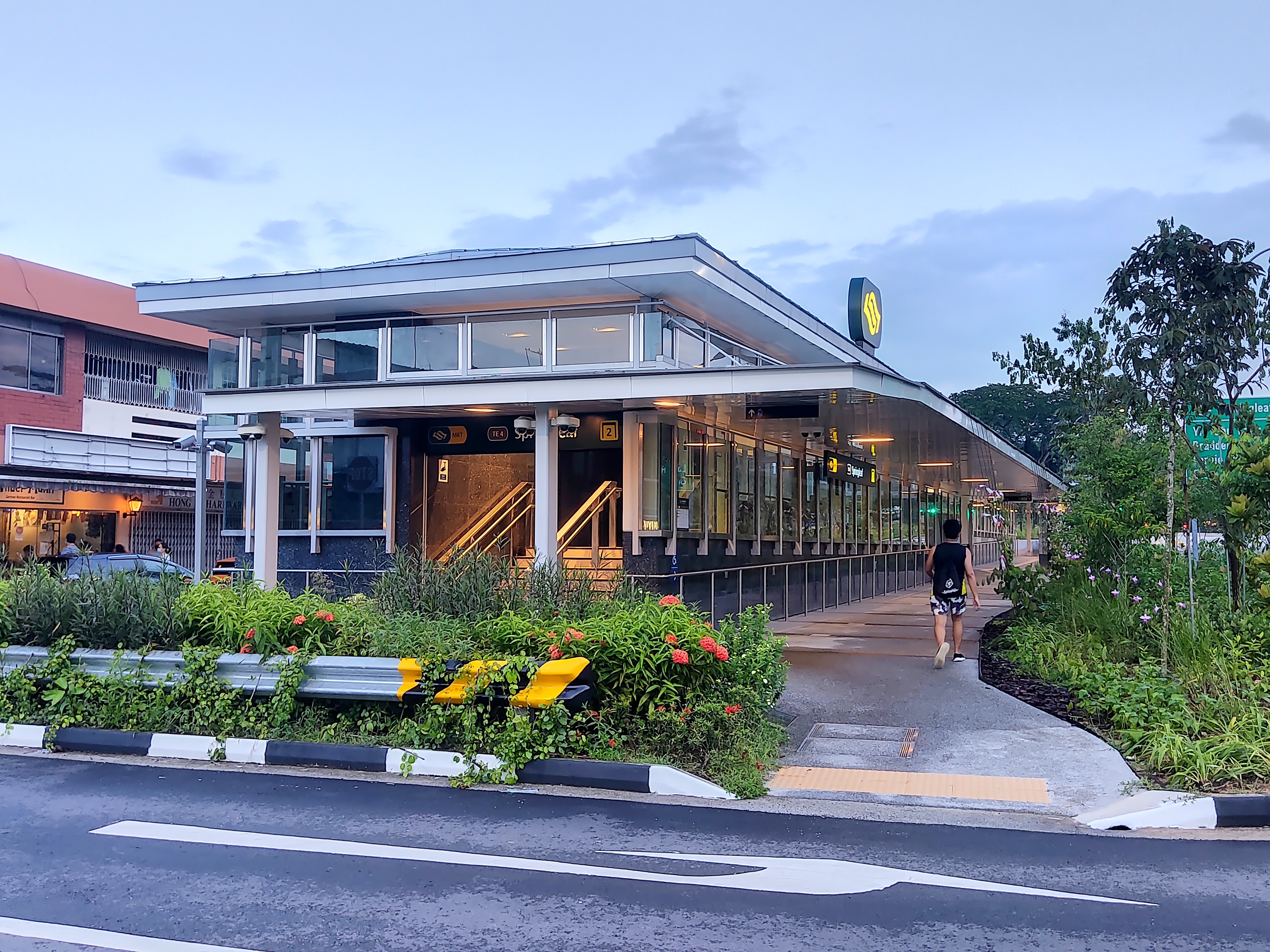
Exit 2 of the station

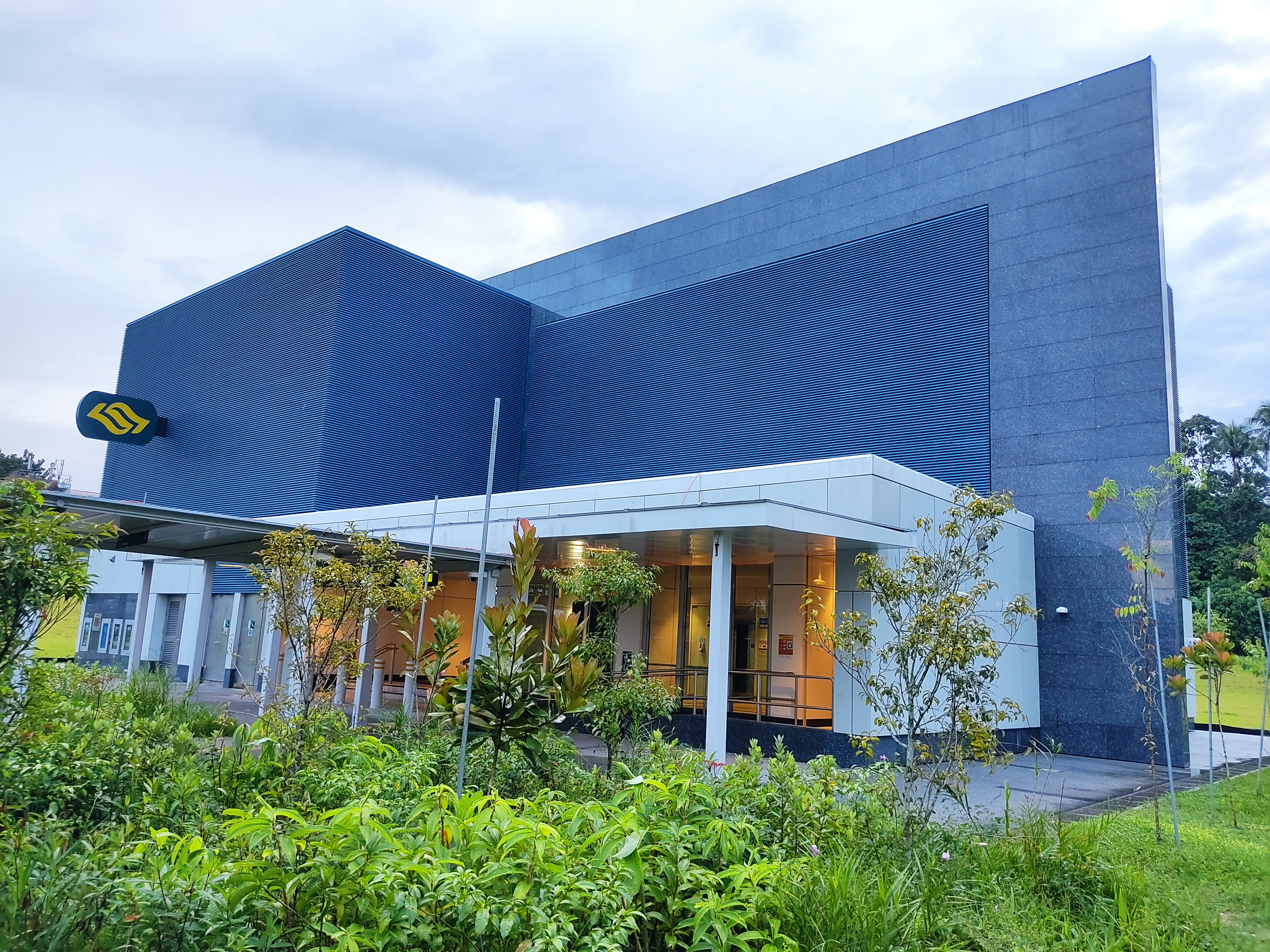
Exit 3 of the station

The station was first announced as part of the 22-station Thomson Line (TSL) on 29 August 2012. In November 2013, the Land Transport Authority (LTA) awarded Contract T208 for the design and construction of Springleaf Station and associated tunnels to Leighton Contractors (Asia) Limited (Singapore Branch) – John Holland Pty Ltd Joint Venture (JV) at S$383 million (US$306.1 million). The station's construction began in 2014, with a scheduled completion date of 2020.

Another contract for the construction of bored tunnels from Seletar Expressway to Springleaf station (alongside other facilities) was awarded to Shimizu Corporation at a sum of S$189.8 million (US$149.8 million) in January 2014. On 15 August 2014, the LTA announced that the TSL would merge with the Eastern Region Line to form the Thomson–East Coast Line (TEL). Springleaf station, part of the proposed line, would be constructed as part of TEL 2, consisting of six stations between this station and Caldecott.

Springleaf station was built only seven metres (23 ft) away from the shophouses located along Upper Thomson Road. To minimise ground movement and any damage to the shophouses, cement was mixed into the ground while an earth-retaining stabilising structure was installed to strengthen the soil. Cranes and heavy machinery had to be carefully installed, with restricted movements to avoid endangering the shophouses and patrons. Barriers were installed to minimise noise pollution, and workers draped noise curtains on heavy machinery. Meanwhile, the LTA collaborated closely with the power supplier PowerGrid to construct a cable tunnel through the station.

With restrictions imposed on construction due to the COVID-19 pandemic, the TEL 2 completion date was pushed to 2021. On 14 December 2020, it was announced that the opening of TEL 2 had been delayed to the third quarter of 2021 so the rail system software for the line could be reviewed. As announced during a visit by Transport Minister S. Iswaran at Caldecott station on 30 June 2021, the station began operations on 28 August 2021.

The King of Malaysia Ibrahim Iskandar of Johor visited the station on 7 May 2024 during his state visit to Singapore.

== Details ==
Springleaf station serves the TEL of the Singapore MRT system. Between the Woodlands South and Lentor stations, the official station code is TE4. Being part of the TEL, the station is operated by SMRT Trains; train frequencies on the TEL range from 3 to 6 minutes.

The station has three entrances that serve the Springleaf Nature Park, Thong Soon residential estate and the shophouses along Upper Thomson Road. The station will also serve future housing developments in the area.

The Art-in-Transit artwork for the station Tree of Memories is displayed on the station's lift shaft. The artwork depicts shophouses in the vicinity enveloped by a banyan tree that can be seen at the nearby Springleaf Nature Park, intended to illustrate the "spatial connection" between people and nature.
