= Lentor MRT station =

Mass Rapid Transit station in Singapore

Lentor TE5 伦多 லென்ட்டோர்
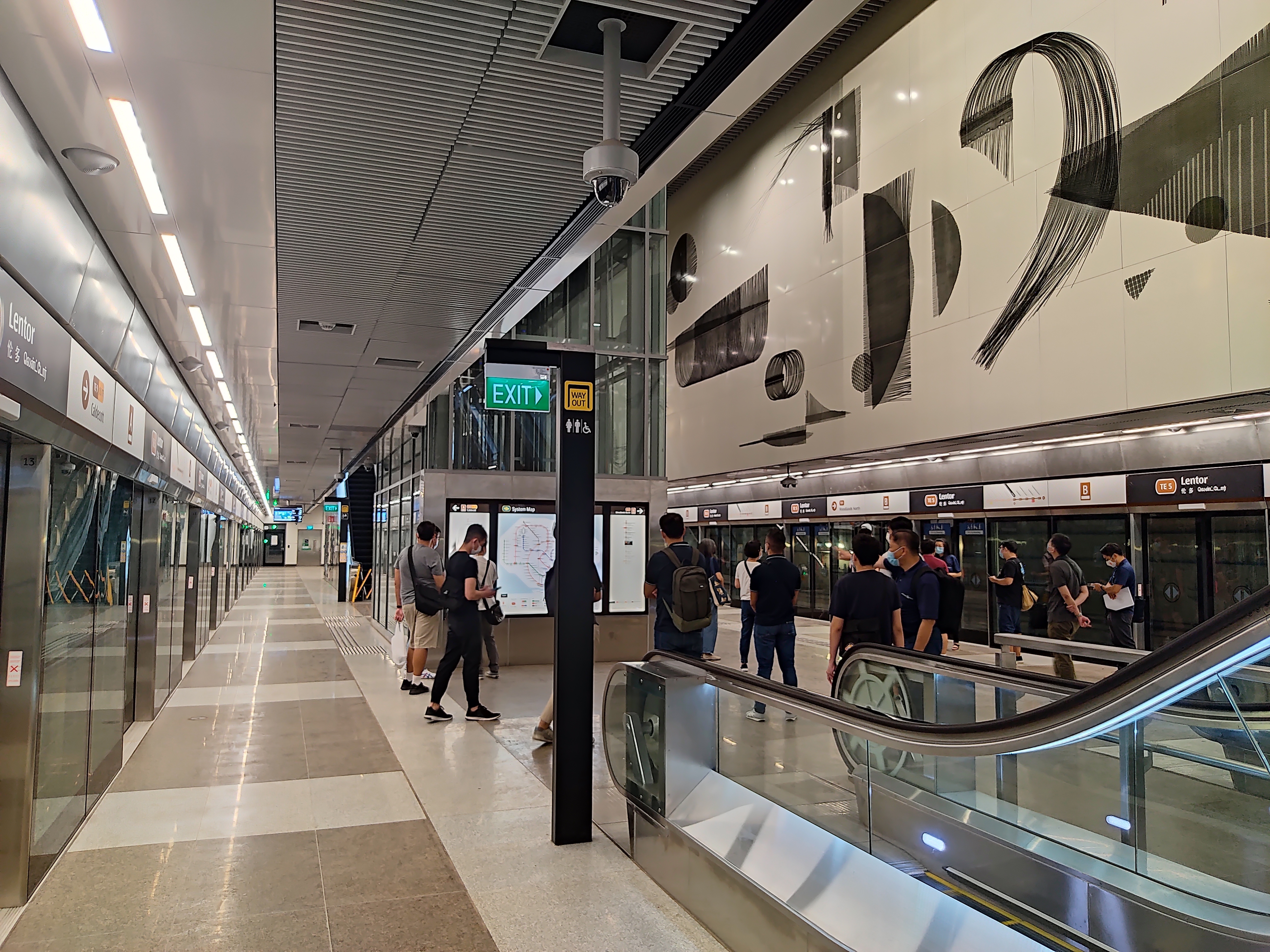
- Platform level of Lentor station with the featured artwork

General information
- Location: 1 Lentor Drive, Singapore 789361
- Coordinates: 01°23′05″N 103°50′12″E
- System: Mass Rapid Transit (MRT) station
- Owner: Land Transport Authority
- Operator: SMRT Trains
- Line: Thomson–East Coast Line
- Platforms: 2 (1 island platform)
- Tracks: 2
- Connections: Bus, Taxi

Construction
- Structure type: Underground
- Platform levels: 1
- Accessible: Yes

Other information
- Station code: LTR

History
- Opened: 28 August 2021; 5 years ago
- Former names: Lentor Green, Teacher's Estate

Passengers
- June 2024: 4,169 per day

Services
Preceding station	Mass Rapid Transit	Following station
Springleaf towards Woodlands North	Thomson–East Coast Line	Mayflower towards Bayshore
Track layout
Location
- Location within Singapore Rail

Lentor MRT station (IPA: /ˈlɛntɔːr/ LEN-tor) is an underground Mass Rapid Transit (MRT) station on the Thomson–East Coast Line (TEL). It is situated in northern Ang Mo Kio, Singapore, underneath Lentor Drive. The station serves various residential estates such as Lentor Estate and Teacher's Estate, as well as landmarks such as Anderson Primary School and the Saint Thomas Orthodox Syrian Cathedral.

First announced in August 2012 as part of the Thomson Line (TSL), the station was constructed as part of TEL Phase 2 (TEL2) after plans for the TSL and the Eastern Region line (ERL) were merged. The station was built using the top-down method; the works had to avoid damaging the major telecommunication cables at the working site. Along with the TEL2 stations, Lentor opened on 28 August 2021 and features an Art-in-Transit artwork Interlude by Tan Guo-Liang.

== History ==
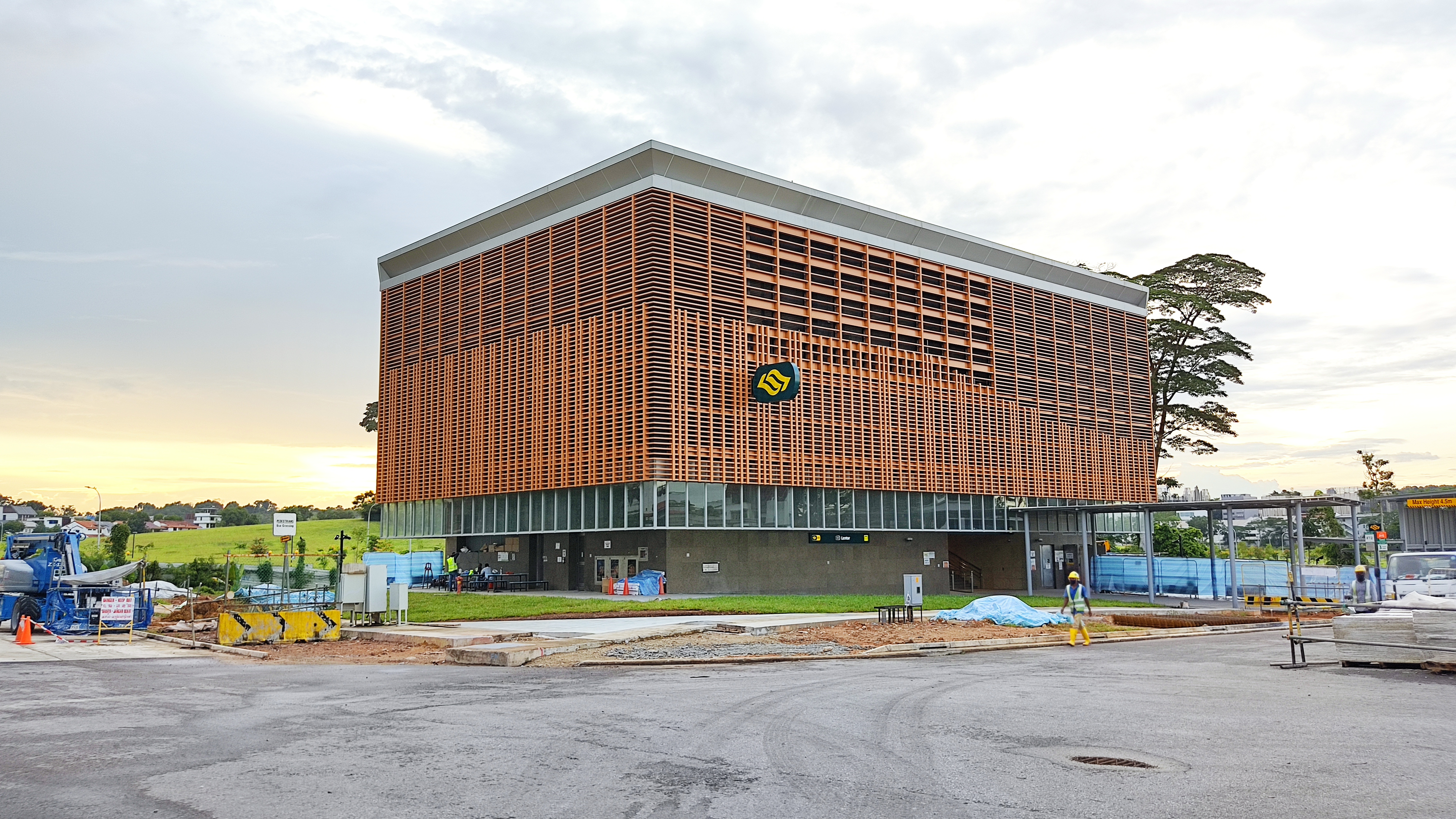
Station entrance under construction prior to opening

Lentor station was first announced as part of the 22-station Thomson Line (TSL) on 29 August 2012. In October 2013, the Land Transport Authority (LTA) awarded Contract T209 for the design and construction of Lentor station and associated tunnels to China Railway No. 5 Engineering Group Co. Ltd (Singapore Branch) at S$247 million (US$197.4 million). The station's construction began in 2014, with a scheduled completion date of 2020.

On 15 August 2014, the LTA announced that the TSL would merge with the Eastern Region Line to form the Thomson–East Coast Line (TEL). Lentor station, part of the proposed line, would be constructed as part of TEL2, consisting of six stations between Springleaf and Caldecott. The station was constructed using the top-down method to minimise impact to the surrounding developments. The workers conducted an extensive survey to locate the network of utility services at the construction site. This prevents disruption affecting the area. Prime Minister Lee Hsien Loong inaugurated the station's groundbreaking ceremony on 6 September.

In the early morning of 1 March 2018, a 48-year-old construction worker died after falling from a working platform, 2.5 metres (8.2 ft) above the ground, while working in a tunnel leading to the station. Prior to the incident, four other workers were dismantling components of a tunnel boring machine (TBM) after finishing tunneling works. A component of the TBM, a man-lock chamber, was being lowered using chain blocks when it abruptly swung, striking the platform that the worker was standing on.

With restrictions imposed on construction due to the COVID-19 pandemic, the TEL 2 completion date was pushed to 2021. On 14 December 2020, it was further announced that the opening of TEL 2 was delayed to the third quarter of 2021 so the rail system software for the line could be reviewed. As announced during a visit by Transport Minister S. Iswaran at Caldecott station on 30 June 2021, the station began operations on 28 August 2021.

== Station details ==
Station interior

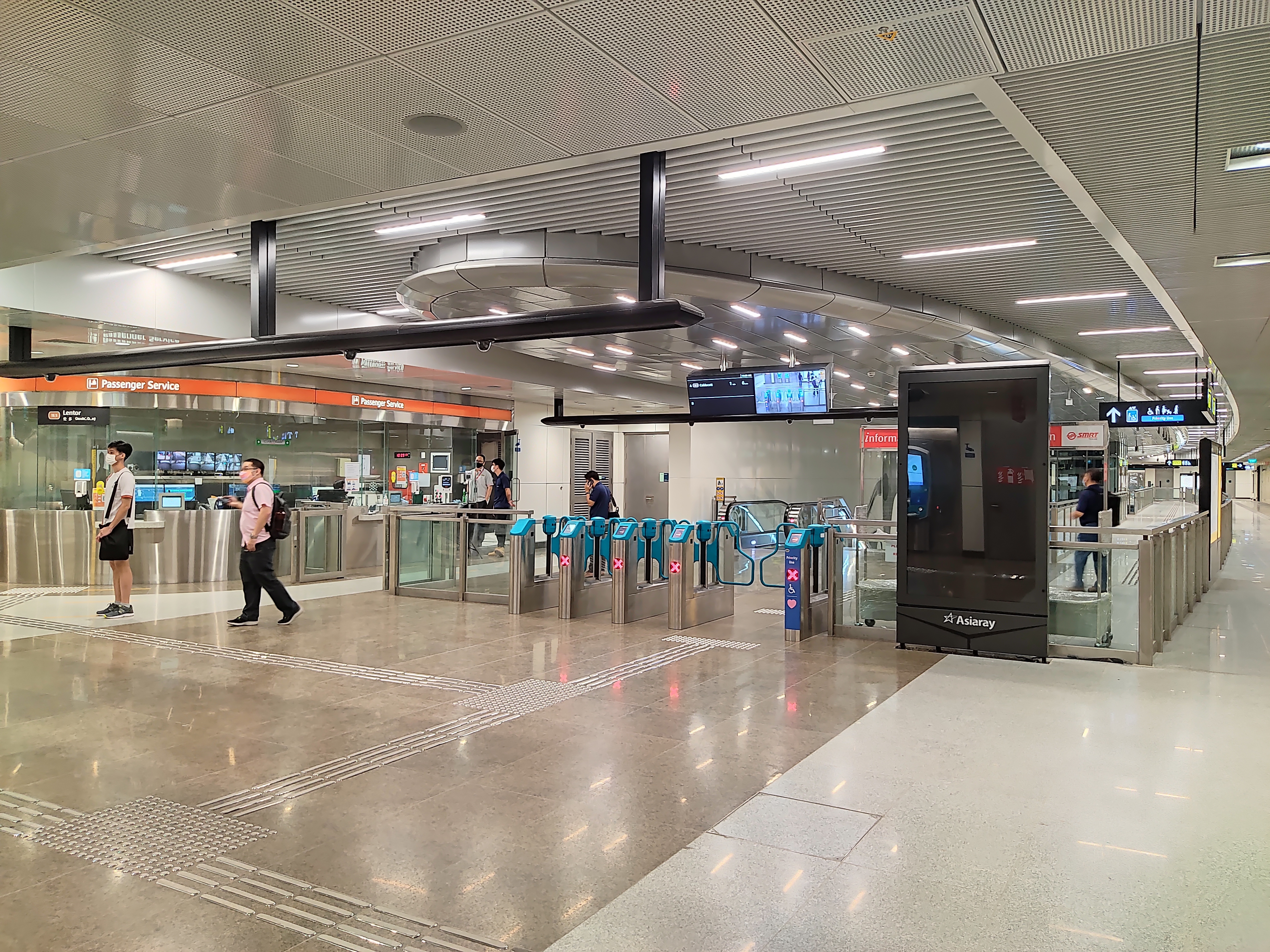
Station concourse

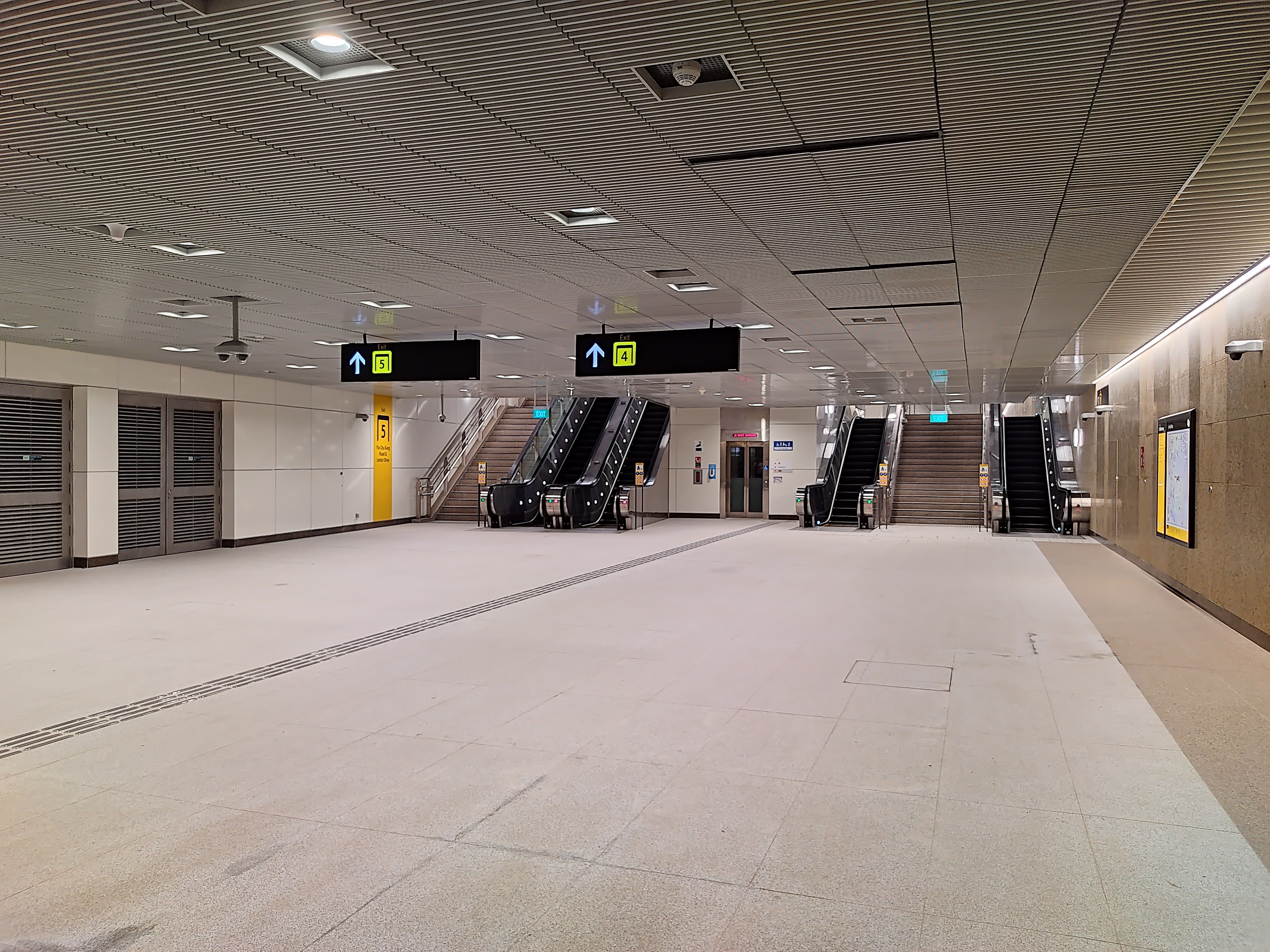
Station linkway to Exits 4 and 5

Lentor station serves the TEL and is between Springleaf and Mayflower stations. The official station code is TE5. Being part of the TEL, the station is operated by SMRT Trains. Train frequencies on the TEL range from 3 to 6 minutes. The station is located underneath Lentor Drive near the junction with Yio Chu Kang Road. The five entrances of Lentor station serve the surrounding residential areas of Lentor Estate and Teacher’s Estate, as well as landmarks such as Anderson Primary School, First Evangelical Reformed Church and Saint Thomas Orthodox Syrian Cathedral.

Designed by SAA Architects, the station design is inspired by the greenery covering Yio Chu Kang Road. The station columns resemble tree structures branching out to support the roof, with timbre panels that allow natural light into the station, similar to rainforest canopies. The station is a designated Civil Defence (CD) shelter and contains a reinforced structure with blast doors. During a chemical attack, the air vents of the station can be shut to prevent the circulation of toxic gases. The CD shelter has dedicated cubicles for chemical decontamination alongside dry toilets.

Lentor station features an Art-in-Transit artwork: Interlude by Tan Guo-Liang. The work, created using mesh fabric, depicts musical notes and calligraphic scripts. Tan intended for his work to be viewed as a "visual poem", and he was inspired by the streets named after prominent poets, such as Rabindranath Tagore, According to the artist, the curved lines on the artwork added further significance to the piece, as the station name "Lentor" (also spelt Lentur) means "flexible" in Standard Singaporean Malay.
