= Vaumarcus railway station =

Former railway station in Switzerland

Vaumarcus
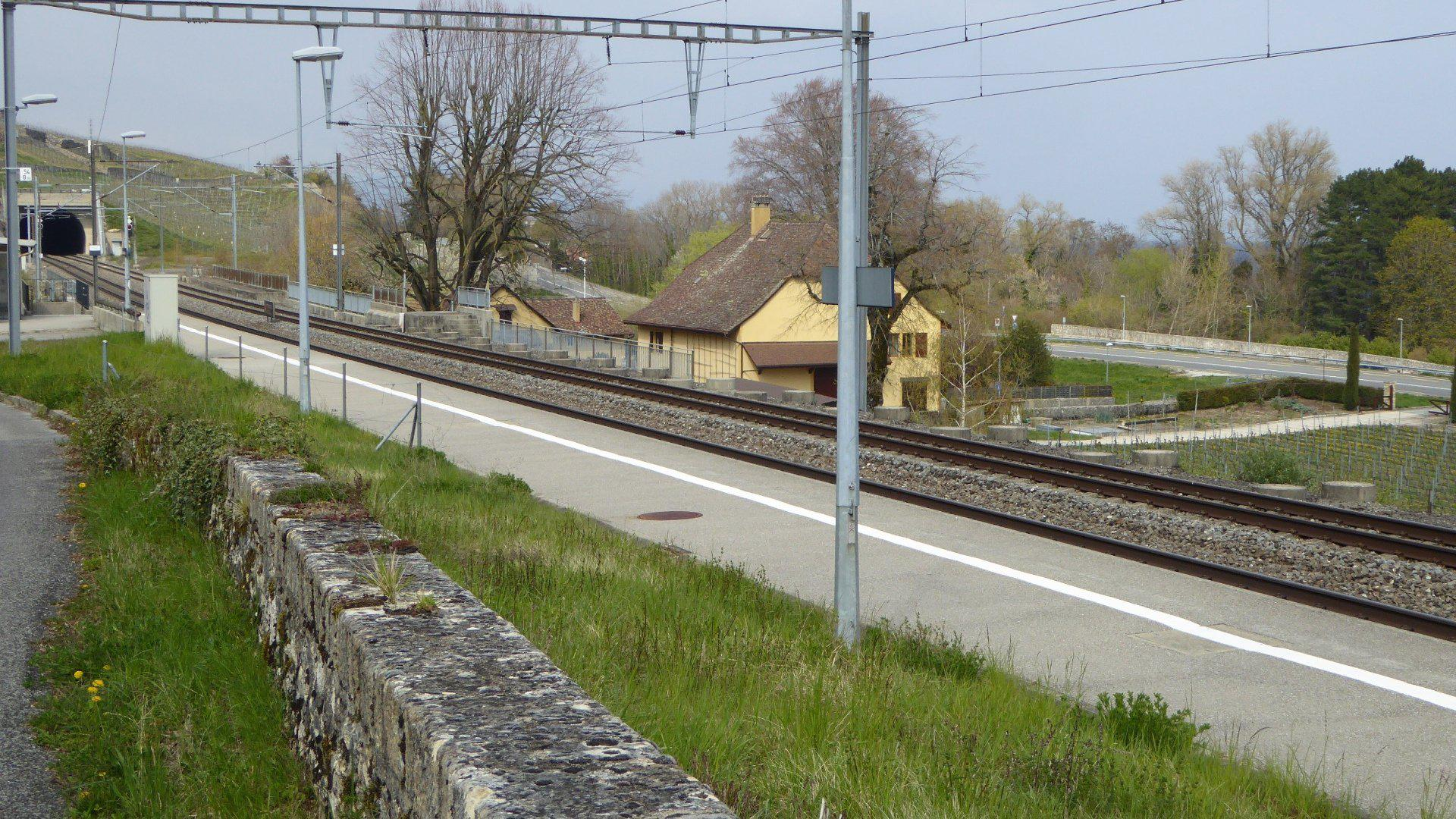
- The station platform in 2018

General information
- Location: La Grande Béroche; Switzerland
- Coordinates: 46°52′39″N 6°45′27″E
- Elevation: 446 m (1,463 ft)
- Owner: Swiss Federal Railways
- Line: Jura Foot line
- Distance: 54.8 km (34.1 mi) from Lausanne
- Platforms: 1 side platform
- Tracks: 2
- Connections: CarPostal SA bus lines

Construction
- Parking: 3
- Accessible: No

Other information
- Station code: 8504204 (VAU)

History
- Closed: 15 December 2024
Location
- Location within Switzerland Location within Canton of Neuchâtel

Vaumarcus railway station (French: Gare de Vaumarcus) was a railway station in the municipality of La Grande Béroche, in the Swiss canton of Neuchâtel. It is an intermediate stop on the standard gauge Jura Foot line of Swiss Federal Railways. The station closed with the December 2024 timetable change.
