= January 1914 =

Month of 1914

<<	January 1914					>>
Su	Mo	Tu	We	Th	Fr	Sa
				1	2	3
4	5	6	7	8	9	10
11	12	13	14	15	16	17
18	19	20	21	22	23	24
25	26	27	28	29	30	31

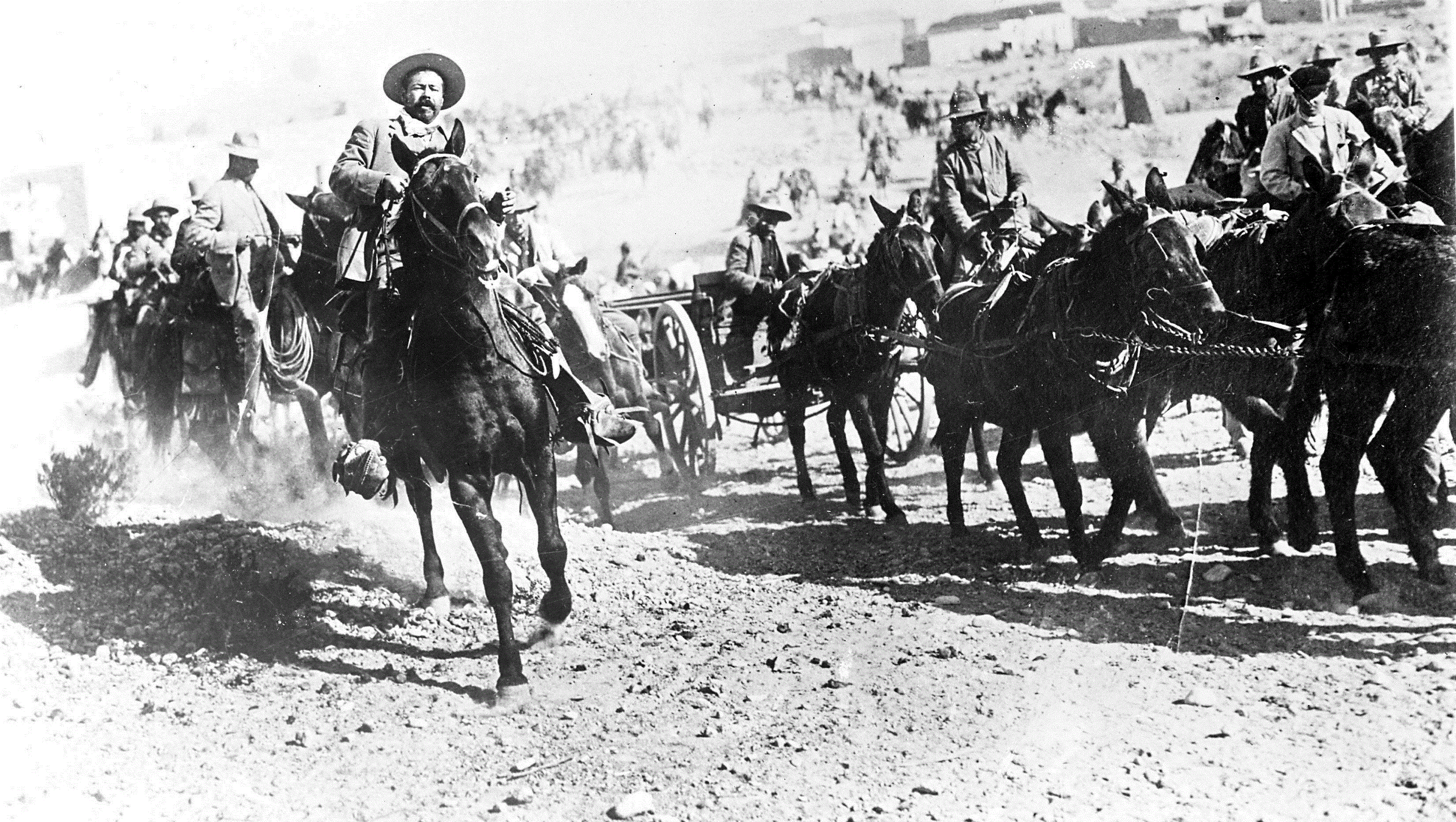
Iconic image of Villa in Ojinaga, a publicity still taken by Mutual Film Corporation photographer John Davidson Wheelan in January 1914

The following events occurred in January 1914:

== January 1, 1914 (Thursday) ==
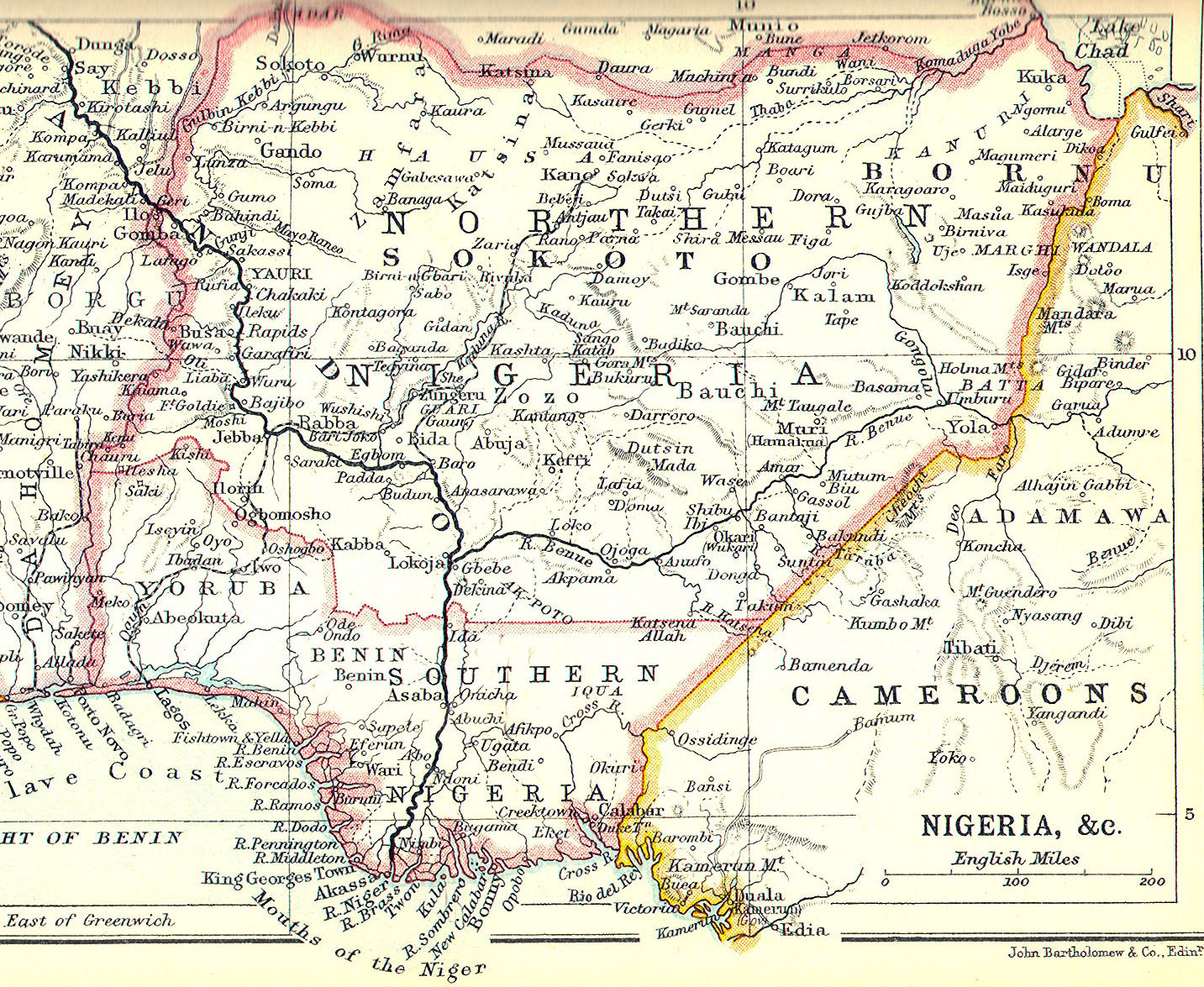
A map displaying Southern and Northern Nigeria, 1914

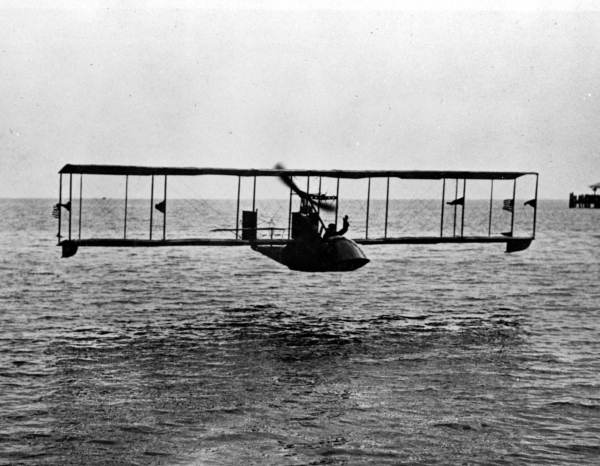
A Benoist XIV over Tampa Bay in Florida in 1914.

- British governor Sir Frederick Lugard successfully completed amalgamation of the Northern and Southern protectorates of Nigeria to form a united country that was presided over by a proconsul entitled the Governor-General of Nigeria. Although formally the country's name was derived from the Niger River, some accounts attribute the name of the country to Lady Lugard, wife of the governor, in a letter she wrote to The Times on 8 January 1897. Lady Lugard suggested the name Nigeria as a shortened alternative to the Royal Niger Company's Territories, in reference to the mercantile company chartered by the British government to operate in that region.
- Battle of Ojinaga – About 6,000 of Pancho Villa's soldiers under command of Gen. Toribio Ortega Ramírez attacked 4,000 federal troop occupying Ojinaga, a town on the Mexican-U.S. border. Ramírez's men forced federal troops out of outlying outposts into the adobe buildings of the town, but were stalled by artillery bombardment.
- The St. Petersburg–Tampa Airboat Line in the United States started services between St. Petersburg and Tampa, Florida, becoming the first airline to provide scheduled regular commercial passenger services with winged aircraft, with Tony Jannus (the first federally-licensed pilot) conveying passengers in a Benoist flying boat. Abram C. Pheil, former mayor of St. Petersburg, was the first airline passenger and over 3,000 people witnessed the first departure.
- The Naval Wing of the Royal Flying Corps was given the responsibility for the operation of all British military airships. The Royal Navy retained control of all British airships until December 1919.
- Horatio Clarence Hocken was reelected mayor of Toronto, defeating Fred McBrien with over 21,000 votes to the challenger's 16,000. The city also elected to city council Louis Singer, the first representative of Toronto's large Jewish community.
- Kornelis ter Laan, member of the House of Representatives of the Netherlands, was appointed mayor of Zaandam, becoming the first politician from the Social Democratic Workers' Party to hold a municipal leadership position. He would remain mayor until 1937.
- The Toyokawa Railway opened in Aichi Prefecture, Japan, with stations Higashi-Akasaka and Higashi-Shimmachi serving the line.
- The Southern Line of the State Railway of Thailand was extended in the Nakhon Si Thammarat province, Thailand, with stations Thung Song Junction serving the line.
- Francis W. Martin assumed office as the first Bronx County District Attorney in New York City as The Bronx became New York state's newest county.
- The Five Nations January 1, 1914 (Championship]] – an international rugby tournament – commenced with England, France, Ireland, Scotland and Wales in competition. Originally started out as the Home Nations Championships involving only the countries in the British Isles, the name was changed to reflect the inclusion of France. Ten matches were spread out over weeks with the final played in April.
- World Baseball Tour – The tour reached Australia and played a New Year's Day game in Brisbane, with the New York Giants beating the Chicago White Sox 2–1.
- The copyright on the Richard Wagner opera Parsifal expired allowing it to be staged outside of Bayreuth, Germany. Over 50 opera houses around Europe stage performances over a seven-month period.
- French artist Charles Ginner introduced the concept of neorealism in a manifesto published in the art magazine New Age.
- The Hurtig & Seamon's New Burlesque Theater opened in Harlem, New York City. It was renamed the Apollo Theater in 1934 when the music hall began allowing black patrons, becoming one of the most famous venues for African-American music and live performers.
- The first edition of The Moldovan Word was published in Bessarabia, Austria-Hungary, and lasted until 1919. The paper was revived in 1943.
- Daily newspaper The Tweed Daily was first published in Murwillumbah, New South Wales, Australia.
- The West Tampa Free Public Library opened in Tampa, Florida and the first public library of Hillsborough County, Florida. The building was added to the National Register of Historic Places in 1983.
- The sports club Grüner was established in Oslo, starting with the association football club and followed by ice hockey and handball programs.
- Berlevåg Municipality and Gamvik Municipality were established in Norway.
- Born:
  - Noor Inayat Khan, British intelligence officer, member of the Special Operations Executive embedded with the French Resistance during World War II, recipient of the George Cross; in Moscow, Russian Empire (present-day Russia) (executed in Dachau, 1944)
  - Adwaita Mallabarman, Bengali writer, author of the novel A River Called Titas; in the Brahmanbaria District, Bengal, British India (present-day Bangladesh) (d. 1951)
  - L. S. N. Prasad, Indian pediatrician, professor of pediatrics at Patna Medical College and Hospital; as Lala Suraj Nandan Prasad, in Bihar Sharif, British India (present-day India) (d. 2009)
- Died: Alice Brady, Irish labour activist, youth leader in the Dublin lock-out, died of complications from gunshot wound (b. 1898)

== January 2, 1914 (Friday) ==
- Battle of Ojinaga – An estimated 1,000 casualties were reported as the battle moved into its second day, with Pancho Villa's troops under the command of Gen. Toribio Ortega Ramírez slowly gaining ground against defending federal troops in Ojinaga, Mexico in spite of constant artillery bombardment. Many federal troops deserted and crossed the Mexican-U.S. border into Presidio, Texas where the United States Army assisted the Red Cross in setting up a mobile hospital to treat wounded while at the same time disarming and turning away hundreds of others.
- British aviator Eleanor Trehawke Davies became the first woman to experience an aerobatic loop as a passenger in a Morane-Saulnier monoplane piloted by fellow countryman Gustav Hamel.
- The Cleveland Trust Bank established the Cleveland Foundation in Cleveland to support community initiatives in the surrounding counties.
- Born:
  - Vivian Stuart, British writer for best-selling romantic single novels and series; as Violet Vivian Finlay, in Berkshire, England (d. 1986)
  - Rachel Saint, American missionary, known for her missionary work with the Waorani people in Ecuador; in Wyncote, Pennsylvania, United States (d. 1994)
- Died: Raoul Pugno, French composer, best known for his piano interpretations of Mozart (b. 1852)

== January 3, 1914 (Saturday) ==
- Battle of Ojinaga – An estimated 2,000 wounded or deserting Mexican federal troops crossed the Mexican–U.S. border into Presidio, Texas as Pancho Villa's revolutionary troops pounded federal defenses in the town of Ojinaga, Mexico.
- The returned Mona Lisa only received 60 visits at the Louvre in Paris. The painting had been missing for about 2 1/2 years before Vincenzo Peruggia, a Louvre employee who had stolen the painting, attempted to sell it to museum officials in Florence.
- Caffè San Marco officially opened for business in Trieste, Italy, becoming a famous rendezvous for many artists and intellectuals including James Joyce, Umberto Saba and Italo Svevo. The café would be destroyed in World War I and rebuilt.
- The musical Nuts and Wine – with lyrics by C. H. Bovill and P. G. Wodehouse and music by Frank E. Tours – premiered at the Empire Theatre in London.
- World Baseball Tour – The New York Giants and the Chicago White Sox entertained crowds in Sydney, Australia with an exhibition game of baseball, with the Sox beating the Giants, 5–4.
- Born:
  - Adelheid Habsburg-Lorraine, member of Austrian Imperial family; at Schloss Hetzendorf in Vienna, Austria-Hungary (present-day Austria) (d. 1971)
  - Madman Muntz, American entrepreneur, creator of the "madman" advertising persona; as Earl Williams Muntz, in Elgin, Illinois, United States (d. 1987)
- Died: John Willms, American clergy, missionary for Pennsylvania, rector of the Pittsburgh Catholic College of the Holy Ghost (now Duquesne University) and director of the Association of the Holy Childhood (b. 1849)

== January 4, 1914 (Sunday) ==
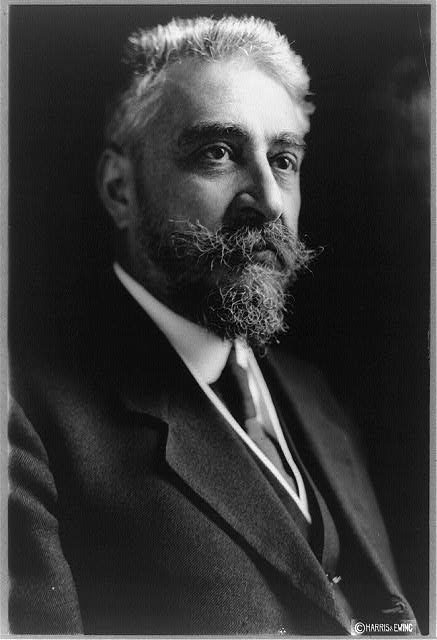
Romanian Prime Minister Brătianu

- Ion I. C. Brătianu became Prime Minister of Romania for the second time, replacing Titu Maiorescu, and formed his third cabinet for the Government of Romania.
- Tanker Oklahoma on her return trip to Port Arthur, Texas ran into a strong gale while approximately 60 nautical miles (110 km) south east of Cape May, New Jersey and broke in two with the loss of one passenger and 25 of her 38 crew. Survivors were rescued by German liner Bavaria and the steamer Gregory.
- Battle of Ojinaga – Pancho Villa relieved General Toribio Ortega Ramírez of command after the officer ordered his men to withdraw after four days of fruitless attacks against federal troops barricaded in the town of Ojinaga, Mexico. An additional 1,000 revolutionary soldiers were brought up from Chihuahua City to strengthen the current attacking force.
- Thomas Winsmore, a three-masted schooner ran aground on a shoal during a storm in the Atlantic Ocean off the coast of North Carolina. Her crew were rescued by USRC Seminole and the ship was towed back to shore.
- Canadian schooner Ionia sank during a storm off Sable Island – located 109 miles (175 km) southeast of Nova Scotia – with all seven crew reported lost.
- The Short Admiralty aircraft was first flown near Eastchurch, England, with aviation designer Charles Richard Fairey as passenger. The model would be used by the Royal Navy during World War I.
- Born:
  - Herman Franks, American baseball player, catcher for the St. Louis Cardinals, Brooklyn Dodgers, Philadelphia Athletics, and New York Giants from 1939 to 1949; in Price, Utah, United States (d. 2009)
  - Jean-Pierre Vernant, French historian and anthropologist, specialized in ancient Greece; in Provins, France (d. 2007)
- Died:
  - Silas Weir Mitchell, American physician, credited for discovering causalgia (b. 1829)
  - Mark Melford, British stage actor and playwright, pioneer of British farce (b. 1850)

== January 5, 1914 (Monday) ==
- Zabern Affair – Military trials commenced in Strasbourg, Germany for Colonel Adolf von Reuter, commanding officer of the Prussian Infantry Regiment 99 in Saverne, Alsace (now in France), and Second Lieutenant Schadt, both charged of unlawfully appropriating authority from the civilian police during and after a public protest on November 28, 1913.
- Ford Motor Company announced an eight-hour workday and a daily wage of $5. The new workplace policy increased the auto manufacturer's productivity, and a significant increase in profit margin (from $30 million to $60 million in two years).
- The first classes were held at Luther Academy in Melville, Saskatchewan. The Academy became affiliated with the University of Saskatchewan in 1971 and moved to Regina to become Luther College.
- The Paulton Halt railway station opened in Somerset, England.
- World Baseball Tour – The New York Giants and the Chicago White Sox played their second baseball exhibition game in Sydney, Australia with the Sox beating the Giants, 10–5.
- The newspaper Vairas was first published in Vilnius, Lithuania as the mouthpiece of the Lithuanian Nationalist Union.
- Born:
  - George Reeves, American actor, best known for the title role in the 1950s TV series Adventures of Superman; as George Keefer Brewer, in Woolstock, Iowa, United States (died by suicide, 1959)
  - Nicolas de Staël, Russian-French painter best known for his abstract landscape painting; as Nikolai Vladimirovich Stael von Holstein, in Saint Petersburg, Russian Empire (present-day Russia) (d. 1955)
  - Tony DeSantis, American businessman, founder of the Drury Lane theatres; as Anthony DeSantis, in Gary, Indiana, United States (d. 2007)
- Died:
  - François Cellier, English conductor and composer, music director and conductor of the D'Oyly Carte Opera Company (b. 1849)
  - Michel Ephrussi, Russian-French banker and horse breeder, bred several award-winning thoroughbred racing horses (b. 1844)

== January 6, 1914 (Tuesday) ==
- Charles E. Merrill opened his brokerage firm Charles E. Merrill & Co. for business at 7 Wall Street in New York City. His firm joined with Edmund C. Lynch a year later to become Merrill Lynch & Company.
- Battle of Ojinaga – In a surreal turn in Pancho Villa's bloody campaign to take Ojinaga, the Mexican revolutionary signed a film deal with Harry Aitken, who opened the Reliance-Majestic Studio with D. W. Griffith in Hollywood, California later that year. Aitken had sent a film crew of 10 to the Ojinaga battle site to shoot footage of the fighting from the revolutionary army's viewpoint. Aitken was quoted in the press with having second thoughts about the contract between his production company and Villa: "How would you feel to be a partner with a man engaged in killing people, and do you suspect the fact that moving picture machines are in range to immortalize an act of daring or of cruel brutality will have any effect on the warfare itself?"
- The Professional Children's School began admitting students interested in theater work in New York City.
- Born:
  - Federico Caffè, Italian economist, leading thinker on economic policy and welfare; in Castellammare Adriatico, Kingdom of Italy (present-day Pescara, Italy) (disappeared, 1987; declared dead, 1998)
  - Godfrey Edward Arnold, Austrian-American medical researcher in speech pathology; as Gottfried Eduard Arnold, in Olmütz, Austria-Hungary (present-day Olomouc, Czech Republic) (d. 1989)
  - Kenneth Pitzer, American chemist, known for his Pitzer equations in describing the behavior of molecule ions in water; in Pomona, California, United States (d. 1997)
  - Fred Kilgour, American librarian, founder of the OCLC network; as Frederick Kilgour, in Springfield, Massachusetts, United States (d. 2006)
- Died:
  - Willem Essuman Pietersen, Dutch Gold Coast politician and educator, president of the Gold Coast Aborigines' Rights Protection Society (b. 1844)
  - Charles Tudor Williams, American business executive and educator, brother to Edward Porter Williams, (co-founder of Sherwin-Williams) (b. 1839)

== January 7, 1914 (Wednesday) ==
- The Alexandre La Valley, an old French crane boat, completed its transit though newly completed Panama Canal on a test run, becoming the first actual vessel to do so. The SS Ancon would be the first ship to officially transit the canal on August 15, 1914.
- Some 200 Ottoman Empire soldiers were arrested on board a steamer the port city of Avlona, Albania by the country's provisional government. The Empire had intended to land troops in the port and proclaim Gen. Ahmed Izzet Pasha "King of Albania." Martial law was declared in the country immediately after the arrests, leading to a revolt among the Albanian peasantry.
- Battle of Ojinaga – Pancho Villa delayed an attack on federal troops barricaded in the town of Ojinaga, Mexico until a four-man film crew from New York City was able to cross the Mexican-U.S. border and reach the rebel army's line. Villa had signed a contract with Harry Aitken and Frank M. Thayer of Mutual Film to have the battle filmed. Footage of the battle was edited into staged scenes to give the film more of a narrative and released as The Life of General Villa, produced by D. W. Griffith and directed by Raoul Walsh who also appeared in the film. The film is now presumably lost.
- World Baseball Tour – The tour moved on to Melbourne, Australia where the New York Giants attempted to even out the series wins on the continent with a 12–8 victory over the Chicago White Sox in front of a crowd of 10,000.
- The Uruguayan association football club Rampla Juniors was formed near Montevideo.
- Died: Joseph Dubuc, Canadian politician and federal judge, member of the Legislative Assembly of Manitoba from 1870 to 1878, member of the Court of Queen's Bench of Manitoba from 1879 to 1909 (b. 1840)

== January 8, 1914 (Thursday) ==
- South African workers with The Amalgamated Society of Railway and Harbour Servants began to strike in the Transvaal and Orange Free State over the previous October decision of the Railway Administration to retrench labor.
- World Baseball Tour – The Melbourne stop closed the Australian leg of the tour with the New York Giants clinching a 4–3 win over the Chicago White Sox in 11 innings.
- Born:
  - Norman Nicholson, British poet, best known for works about the life and language of his hometown of Millom; in Millom, England (d. 1987)
  - Lucien Bodard, French journalist and writer, best known for covering events in Asia including the rise of the communist China; in Chongqing, Republic of China (present-day China) (d. 1998)
  - Hermann Pilnik, German-born Argentine chess Grandmaster; in Stuttgart, German Empire (present-day Germany) (d. 1981)
- Died: Simon Bolivar Buckner, American soldier and politician, Confederate States Army officer and 30th Governor of Kentucky (b. 1823)

== January 9, 1914 (Friday) ==
- The Phi Beta Sigma fraternity was founded by African American students at Howard University in Washington, D.C.
- Born:
  - Derek Allhusen, British Olympic equestrian, gold and silver medalist at the 1968 Summer Olympics in Mexico; in London, England (d. 2000)
  - Ted Berkman, American journalist and screenwriter, best known for Bedtime for Bonzo starring Ronald Reagan; as Edward Oscar Berkman, in New York City, United States (d. 2006)
  - James P. Coleman, American politician and judge, 52nd Governor of Mississippi, judge with the United States Court of Appeals for the Fifth Circuit from 1965 to 1981; in Ackerman, Mississippi, United States (d. 1991)
  - Kenny Clarke, American jazz musician, major innovator for the bebop style of drumming; as Kenneth Clarke Spearman, in Pittsburgh, United States (d. 1985)
  - Angus G. Wynne, American entrepreneur, developer of the Six Flags amusement park chain; in East Baton Rouge Parish, Louisiana, United States (d. 1979)

== January 10, 1914 (Saturday) ==
- Battle of Ojinaga – Pancho Villa led a force of 7,000 troops and captured Ojinaga, forcing more than half of the 4,000 defending federal troops to retreat over the Mexican-U.S. border. The victory effectively gave Villa control of nearly all of northern Mexico and cemented his reputation as a great military leader.
- Yuan Shikai, Provisional President for the Republic of China, formally dissolved Parliament after defeating political opponents Chinese Revolutionary Party through months of political and military maneuvers. Yuan began steps to replace the republic's provisional constitution with his own and within months proclaimed himself as China's new emperor.
- Zabern Affair – A military court in Strasbourg, Germany acquitted commanding officer Colonel Adolf von Reuter and Second Lieutenant Schadt for illegally appropriating the civilian police during and after a public protest on November 28, 1913, in Saverne, Alsace.
- Canadian Arctic Expedition – After drifting in ice for several months in the Beaufort Sea, the polar expedition crew of the ship Karluk were wakened to "a severe shudder [that] shook the whole ship," according to expedition member William Laird McKinlay. It was evident ice was attacking the hull, and at 6:45 AM a loud bang was heard, indicating the hull has been punctured. Captain Robert Bartlett observed a gash 10 feet (3.0 m) in the ship's engine room. With the pumps unable to handle the inflow of water, Bartlett ordered the crew to abandon ship.
- Rent strike organizers for 300 tenants living in the Burley area of Leeds called for a city-wide protest against a significant increase in rents imposed by the Leeds branch of the Property Owners Association. The strike lasted eight weeks.
- A by-election for the Australian House of Representatives seat of Adelaide was held, triggered by the death of Labor Party Member of Parliament Ernest Roberts. Labor Party candidate George Edwin Yates won the seat, taking over 10,072 thousand votes (84 per cent) over Single Tax League opponent Edward Craigie at 1,857 (15 per cent).
- Archaeologists T. E. Lawrence and Leonard Woolley were recruited to undertake an archaeological survey of the Negev in Palestine.
- John G. Morrison and his son Arling were killed in their Salt Lake City grocery store by two armed intruders masked in red bandannas. Later that evening, labor activist Joel Emmanuel Hägglund, better known as Joe Hill, met a local doctor to be treated for a bullet wound in the left lung. Hill claimed he had been shot following an argument with a woman but refused to name her. The doctor later reported to police that Hill was also armed with a pistol. Police investigators searched Hill's residence and found a red bandanna but the pistol purported to be in Hill's possession was never found. Hill denied involvement in the robbery and the killing of Morrison. Hill did not know Morrison, and at his trial, defense lawyers pointed out four other people were treated for bullet wounds that same night, and the entry and size of the bullet wound aligned with Hill's testimony of the circumstances when he was shot.
- The Henry Bischoff & Company banking house went into receivership in New York City.
- Norwegian speed skater Oscar Mathisen set the first of five world records throughout the month of January, starting with a finish of 43.7 seconds in the 500 m in Oslo at the newly reopened Frogner stadium, which had to be moved to make room for the Jubilee Exhibition.
- Died:
  - Leonie Aviat, French nun, co-founder of the Oblate Sisters of St. Francis de Sales, canonized in 2001 (b. 1844)
  - Robert Oskar Julius von Görschen, German lawyer, held key business executive positions for Aachen's top two companies (b. 1829)

== January 11, 1914 (Sunday) ==
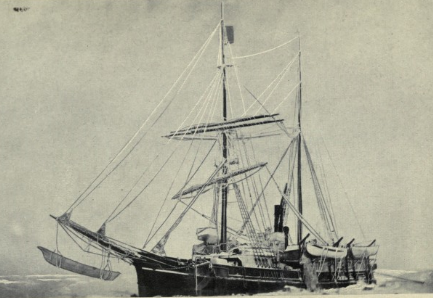
Karluk caught in ice, August 1913

- The Sakurajima volcano in Japan began to erupt after being dormant for over a century, becoming effusive after a very large earthquake on January 12. The lava flow caused the island which it formed to be linked to the Ōsumi Peninsula.
- The People's Party ousted the governing True People's Party in parliamentary elections in Montenegro.
- Canadian Arctic Expedition – The expedition's flagship – the Karluk – was completely abandoned. The crew had worked throughout yesterday when the hull break was discovered and overnight in pitch darkness and driving snow to add rations and equipment to stockpiles already left out on the ice for emergency. At 3:15 PM, Captain Robert Bartlett played Chopin's Funeral March on the ship's Victrola before stepping off the Karluk. The ship sank within minutes. Stranded on the ice were 22 men, one woman, two children, 16 dogs and a cat. The team immediately assembled a "Shipwreck Camp" as they prepared for a march to Wrangel Island, the nearest piece of land, in February when daylight hours were longer.
- The Honam rail line was completed, connecting the cities of Daejeon and Gwangju in Korea with station Jangseong serving the line.
- The Jagadbandhu Institution, an all-boys academy, was established by Jagadbandhu Roy in Calcutta. The school was renowned for producing famous Indian leaders, scholars, artists and scientists including English scholar Chinmoy Guha, art critic Samik Bandyopadhyay, and historian Tapan Raychaudhuri.
- Norway's Oscar Mathisen achieved the second of five world records in speed skating for January, skating 2:19.4 minutes in the 1,500 m in Oslo.
- The Italian association football club Reggina was founded in Reggio Calabria, Italy.
- Born:
  - Beverly Briley, American politician, first mayor of the Nashville and Davidson County metropolitan government from 1963 to 1974; as Clifton Beverly Briley, in West Nashville, Tennessee, United States (d. 1980)
  - Dora del Hoyo, Spanish religious leader, first female member of Opus Dei; as Salvadora Honorata del Hoyo Alonso, in León, Spain (d. 2004)
  - Bernice Gordon, American crossword puzzle constructor for The New York Times; in Philadelphia, United States (d. 2015)
  - Dorothy Jeakins, American film costume designer, co-winner with Barbara Karinska for the first Academy Award for Best Costume Design for Joan of Arc in 1948; in San Diego, United States (d. 1995)
  - Sherman P. Lloyd, American politician, U.S. Representative from Utah from 1963 to 1973; in St. Anthony, Idaho, United States (d. 1979)
- Died: Carl Jacobsen, Danish brewer and patron of the arts, son of J.C. Jacobsen, the founder of the Carlsberg brewery (b. 1842)

== January 12, 1914 (Monday) ==
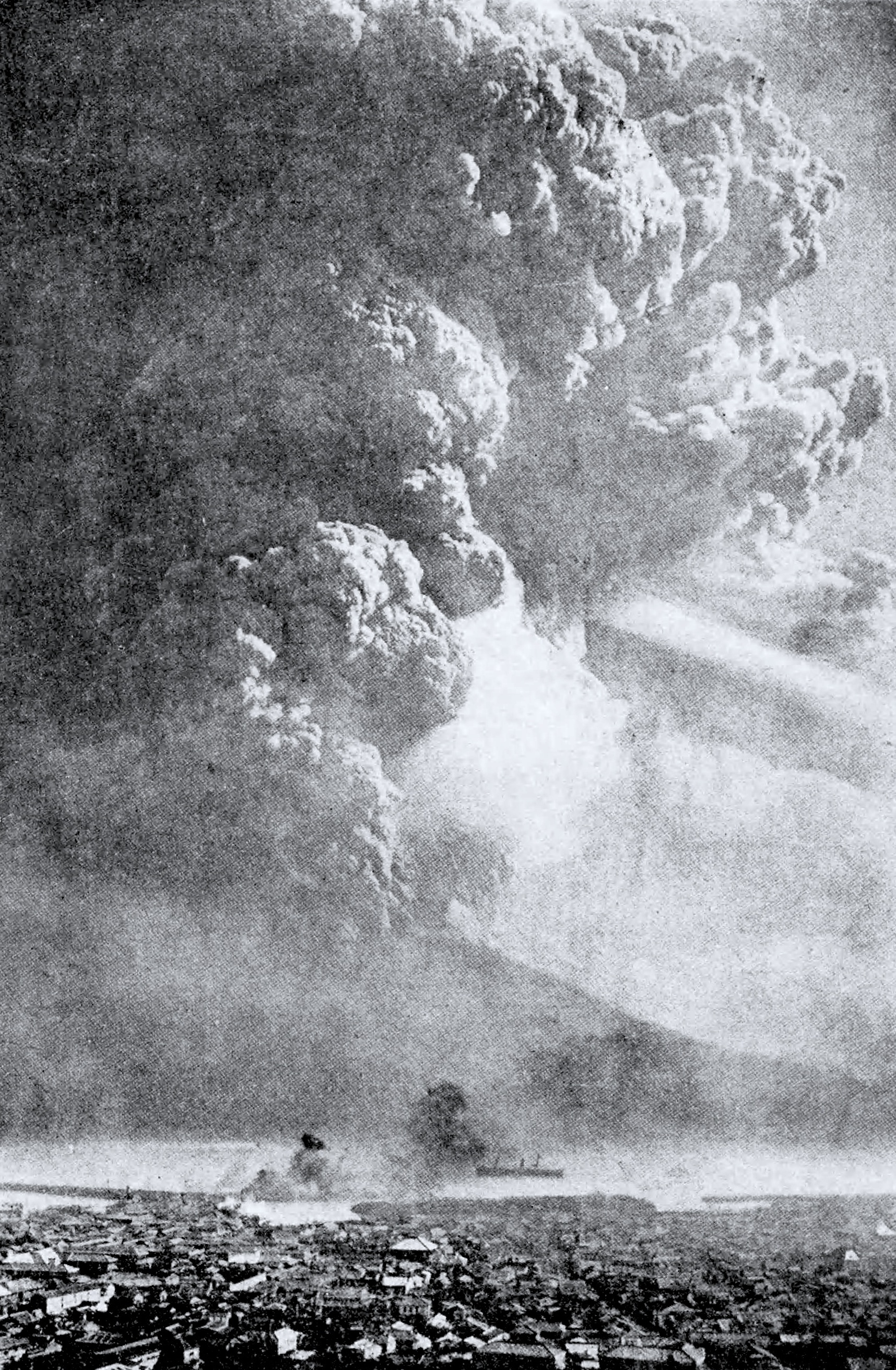
Sakurajima erupting view from Kagoshima, Japan.

- An earthquake measuring 6.7 in magnitude – caused by the erupting Sakurajima volcano – killed 29 people and destroyed 120 homes in the Kagoshima Prefecture, Kyushu, Japan.
- The Brighton station opened in Adelaide, Australia to serve the Seaford railway line.
- Born:
  - Albrecht von Goertz, German industrial designer, designed the BMW 503 and BMW 507; in Brunkensen, German Empire (present-day Germany) (d. 2006)
  - Edward Gurney, U.S. Senator from Florida from 1969 to 1974; in Portland, Maine, United States (d. 1996)
- Died:
  - David Laird, Canadian politician, third Lieutenant Governor of the Northwest Territories, chief negotiator for the inclusion of Prince Edward Island into the Canadian Confederation and of several Canadian indigenous treaties (b. 1833)
  - Anton Dorph, Danish painter, famous for his altarpieces and depictions of fishing life in Denmark (b. 1831)

== January 13, 1914 (Tuesday) ==
- James Michael Curley won 53% of the vote in the mayoral election to become the 41st Mayor of Boston. He would be elected to the mayoral seat three more times as well as serve as the 53rd Governor of Massachusetts.
- Born: Ted Willis, British television dramatist and author, listed by Guinness World Records as the most prolific writer; as Edward Henry Willis, in Tottenham, England (d. 1992)
- Died:
  - Alfred Lichtwark, German art curator and historian, director of the Hamburger Kunsthalle (b. 1852)
  - Edward Charles Spitzka, American neurologist, pioneered studies of the anatomy of the human nervous system (b. 1852)

== January 14, 1914 (Wednesday) ==
- The Ford Motor Company reached a milestone of building a Ford Model T in 93 minutes using the assembly line.
- Karen Blixen, author of Out of Africa, arrived in Kenya and was married the same day to her second cousin Bror Flixen-Finecke, receiving the title of baroness.
- The Bridge of Sighs over New College Lane at Hertford College, Oxford was opened to the public. The crossing was designed by Thomas Graham Jackson, the architect of many of Oxford's turn-of-the-century structures, including the Oxford Military College campus.
- The Italian steamship Lina, transporting 720 tonnes of lumber from Rijeka to Trieste, sank in the Vela vrata strait after hitting the coast of Cres around Cape Pečen in dense fog.
- Born:
  - Harold Russell, Canadian-American World War II soldier and actor, recipient of the Academy Award for Best Actor for The Best Years of Our Lives; in North Sydney, Nova Scotia, Canada (d. 2002)
  - Dudley Randall, American poet and publisher, founder of Broadside Press in 1965; in Detroit, United States (d. 2000)
  - Vince Alascia, American comic book artist, famous for his work on Captain America during the Golden Age of Comic Books (d. 1998)
  - Wang Bingzhang, Chinese military officer, founding commanding officer of the People's Liberation Army and People's Liberation Army Air Force; in Anyang, Republic of China (present-day China) (d. 2005)
  - Thomas J. Watson Jr., American business executive and diplomat, second president of IBM, 16th United States Ambassador to the Soviet Union; in Dayton, Ohio, United States (d. 1993)

== January 15, 1914 (Thursday) ==
- Swift Current, Saskatchewan was incorporated as a city.
- The first meeting of the Indian Science Congress was held at the premises of The Asiatic Society, Calcutta, with Ashutosh Mukherjee, Vice Chancellor of the University of Calcutta presiding over 105 scientists from India and abroad in attendance.
- The Montclair Art Museum opened in Montclair, New Jersey, becoming the first museum in the state that granted access to the public and the first dedicated solely to art.
- Born: Hugh Trevor-Roper, English historian, leading expert of early modern Britain and Nazi Germany at University of Oxford; in Glanton, England (d. 2003)
- Died:
  - Louis Wagner, American military officer, 9th Commander-in-Chief of the Grand Army of the Republic (b. 1838)
  - Hermann, Freiherr von Soden, American-German Biblical scholar, advocate for a more Presbyterian and democratic constitution in the congregations of the Prussian Union of Churches (killed in a railway accident) (b. 1852)

== January 16, 1914 (Friday) ==
- Mahatma Gandhi and Jan Smuts, South Africa's Minister of the Interior, met after a month-long impasse and reached a deal on tax relief for the country's Indian community and a repeal of a state court ruling not to recognize polygamous marriage. The success of reaching a deal after months of civil strife between the Indian community and the South African establishment earned Gandhi the title Mahatma, Sanskrit for "high-souled" or "venerable."
- The Royal Navy submarine A7 sank in Whitesand Bay, Cornwall, England with the loss of all 11 crew.
- The Party of the Right was established in Luxembourg, the predecessor to the Christian Social People's Party.
- The association football club Altay Spor Kulübü was established in İzmir, located in the Ottoman Empire (now Turkey). The club has held a record 15 titles in the İzmir Football League and continues playing at İzmir Alsancak Stadium.
- Born:
  - Roger Wagner, French-American choral musician, leader of renowned Roger Wagner Chorale; in Le Puy, France (d. 1992)
  - Buddy Moss, American blues musician, credits as one of leading guitarists in East Coast blues; as Eugene Moss, in Jewell, Georgia, United States (d. 1984)
  - Claude Simons Jr., American football, baseball and basketball coach for Tulane University, Louisiana from 1938 to 1949; in New Orleans, United States (d. 1975)
- Died:
  - Itō Sukeyuki, Japanese naval officer, 6th Chief of the Imperial Japanese Navy General Staff (b. 1843)
  - George Albertus Cox, Canadian businessman and senator, developed Canada's modern financial industry and member of the Senate of Canada from 1886 to 1914 (b. 1840)
  - Richard Pennefather, Irish-Australian politician, 9th Attorney-General of Western Australia (b. 1851)

== January 17, 1914 (Saturday) ==
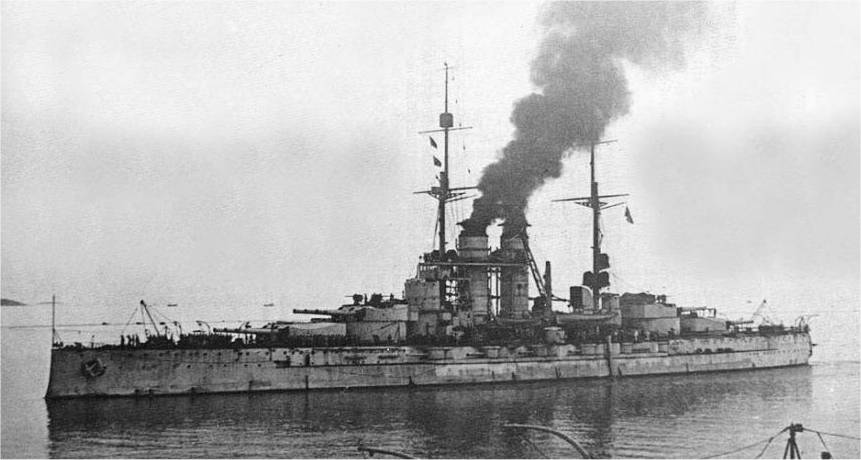
SMS Szent István in the Fažana Strait

- The SMS Szent István battleship for the Austro-Hungarian Navy was launched by Ganz & Company in Fiume (now Rijeka, Croatia). The launching was plagued with problems from the start, with neither the Emperor of Austria Franz Joseph nor Archduke Franz Ferdinand being able to attend. During the launching itself, a starboard anchor had to be dropped to prevent the ship from hitting another ship carrying spectators, but the anchor chain had not been shackled and it struck two dockworkers, killing one and crushing the arm of the other.
- The 13th annual Detroit Auto Show was held on the first three floors of the Ford branch building on Woodward and Boulevard, Detroit.
- Joseph Joel Hammond, the first person from New Zealand to gain a pilot's license in England, became the first person to fly over Auckland. He flew a Blériot monoplane (named Brittania) which had been donated to the New Zealand Government by the Imperial Air Fleet Committee, from Potter's Park (near One Tree Hill).
- Eimskip, the oldest shipping company in Iceland, was formed.
- The Southern Pacific Red Electric Lines began providing passenger train service in the Willamette Valley of Oregon.
- Speed skater Oscar Mathisen of Norway achieved two world records in one day in Davos, Switzerland. He beat his own world record of 43.7 seconds in the 500 m set earlier in the month with 43.4, and skated to a new world record of 8:36.6 minutes in the 5,000 m. He would eventually complete the month with five world records in total.
- Born:
  - Théo Lefèvre, Belgian state leader, 39th Prime Minister of Belgium; as Théodore Joseph Albéric Marie Lefèvre, in Ghent, Belgium (d. 1973)
  - William Stafford, American poet and pacifist, 12th United States Poet Laureate; in Hutchinson, Kansas, United States (d. 1993)
  - Luis de la Fuente, Mexican association football player, Primera División de México champion in 1945 and 1949; as Luis de la Fuente y Hoyos, in Veracruz, Mexico (d. 1972)
  - Héctor P. Garcia, Mexican-American army physician, and activist, founder of the American GI Forum; in Tamaulipas, Mexico (d. 1996)
  - Kurt Freund, Czech-Canadian physician and sexologist best known for developing phallometry; in Chrudim, Bohemia (present-day Czech Republic) (d. 1996)
  - Kurt Franz, German SS officer, commander of the Treblinka extermination camp; in Düsseldorf, German Empire (present-day Germany) (d. 1998)
  - Paul Royle, Australian Royal Air Force pilot during World War II, escapee from the Stalag Luft III POW camp; in Perth, Australia (d. 2015)

== January 18, 1914 (Sunday) ==
- Emiliano Zapata, leader of the Liberation Army of the South signed a treaty with Julián Blanco, the rebel chief in Guerrero, Mexico to unite against the federal army of president Victoriano Huerta.
- The Dublin lock-out ended after four months of dispute between 20,000 workers and 300 employers in Ireland's capital city. Most workers returned to their jobs, signing pledges not to unionize.
- Norwegian athlete Oscar Mathisen became the world's best speed skater of 1914, capping an incredible world-breaking month with his fifth world record in Davos, Switzerland. He broke his own record of 2:19.4 minutes in the 1,500 m with 2:17.4 minutes.
- The Princes Ice Hockey Club of Great Britain won the Les Avants Hockey Championship in Les Avants, Switzerland.
- A party held in honor of English poet Wilfrid Scawen Blunt at his stud farm in West Sussex brought together W. B. Yeats, Ezra Pound, Thomas Sturge Moore, Victor Plarr, Richard Aldington, F. S. Flint and Frederic Manning.
- American industrialist F. Lewis Clark disappeared while on a business trip to Santa Barbara, California. Speculation of his disappearance included possible suicide "by jumping from a pier" in Santa Barbara, as his hat was found in the water nearby.
- Born:
  - Arno Schmidt, German writer, author of Bottom's Dream; in Hamburg, German Empire (present-day Germany) (d. 1979)
  - Vitomil Zupan, Slovene writer, author of A Minuet for Guitar; in Ljubljana, Austria-Hungary (present-day Slovenia) (d. 1987)

== January 19, 1914 (Monday) ==
- The University of Missouri in Columbia, Missouri established a School of Commerce, which was renamed the Trulaske College of Business in 2007.
- British Home Championship – Ireland defeated Wales 2-1 at Racecourse Ground, Wrexham, Wales, in what became an outright championship win for Ireland after years being the underdogs in the association football competition. It was the last series played before the onset of World War I.
- The all-girl Boston High School opened in Boston, Lincolnshire, England with 112 students on roll call.
- The Park Square Theatre opened in Boston as the venue for productions by impresario John Cort, but was purchased by the Archibald and Edgar Selwyn brothers the following year and changed to its present name.
- Born:
  - Bob Gerard, British racing driver, competed in eight Formula One Grands Prix championships; as Frederick Roberts Gerard, in Leicester, England (d. 1990)
  - Ralph Perk, American politician, 52nd Mayor of Cleveland; in Cleveland, United States (d. 1999)
- Died:
  - Georges Picquart, French general and politician, uncovered the real culprit in the Dreyfus affair (b. 1854)
  - Candelaria Figueredo, Cuban partisan fighter, member of the Cuban rebellion during the Ten Years' War against Spain (b. 1852)

== January 20, 1914 (Tuesday) ==
- The International Convention for the Safety of Life at Sea, also known as the SOLAS Convention, was adopted as an international maritime safety treaty. The treaty was in part drafted and adopted in response to the sinking of the Titanic in 1912. Elements of the convention included prescribed numbers of lifeboats and other emergency equipment along with safety procedures for commercial ships, and the establishment of the International Ice Patrol to monitor and alert sea vessels of ice bergs entering major northern shipping lanes.
- The original Magistrates' Court Building opened in Melbourne.
- Born:
  - Vsevolod Ivanovich, last male member of the Romanov family of Imperial Russia; in Saint Petersburg, Russian Empire (present-day Russia) (d. 1973)
  - Oscar Collazo, Puerto Rican revolutionary, attempted to assassinate U.S. President Harry S. Truman in 1950; in Florida, Puerto Rico (d. 1994)

== January 21, 1914 (Wednesday) ==
- The Daily Telegraph reported that Karl Richter, a German employee with the Siemens Tokyo office, had been arrested in Germany for stealing documents indicating that Siemens had previously paid a bribe of 1,000 pounds sterling to the Japanese navy. Richter sold the incriminating documents to the Reuters news agency, along with a telegram from Siemens head office asking the Japanese navy for clarification on a deal offered by Vickers, a British firm, offering more competitive naval contracts over Siemens (which held a virtual monopoly in Japan). Richter was sentenced to two years in prison but his actions led to military intelligence investigations that uncovered many Japanese naval officers had received extensive bribes from various foreign companies.
- Canadian Arctic Expedition – A trail-breaking party of four, led by Karluk's first officer Alexander Anderson, left Shipwreck Camp with instructions from Captain Robert Bartlett to establish a camp on the north shore of Wrangel Island.
- The Jerusalem's Church in Copenhagen was destroyed in a fire.
- Born:
  - Adrian S. Fisher, American lawyer and public servant, legal adviser for the United States Department of War and Department of State for four presidential administrations; in Memphis, Tennessee, United States (d. 1983)
- Died:
  - Donald Smith, Scottish-Canadian politician, High Commission of Canada in the United Kingdom from 1896 to 1914, often referred to as Lord Strathcona (b. 1820)
  - Theodor Kittelsen, Norwegian painter famous of his nature and paintings based on fairy tales and legends, particularly trolls, in Kragerø, Norway (b. 1857)

== January 22, 1914 (Thursday) ==
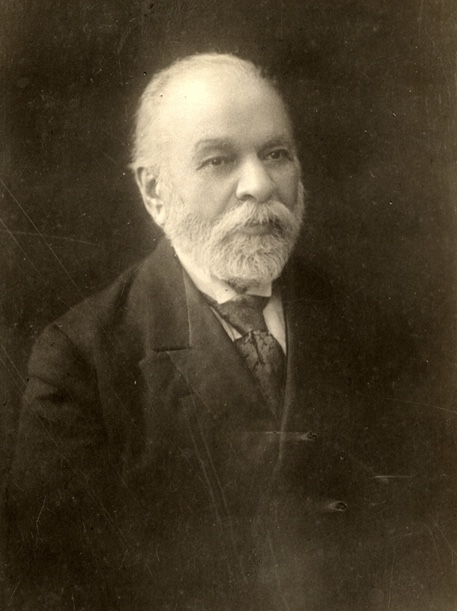
Albanian Prime Minister Kemal

- Ismail Kemal resigned as prime minister of Albania, the first to hold such an office created to head the Provisional Government of Albania. Fejzi Alizoti succeeded him as interim prime minister under the auspices of the International Control Commission, in accordance to the Treaty of London.
- Twelve remaining defendants in the Barisal Conspiracy Case pleaded guilty to conspiracy to wage war against the British Crown in a Calcutta court. Originally, 44 Bengalis had been charged for plans to incite rebellion against the Raj. Five received sentences between 10 and 12 years, and the remaining five to seven years.
- The Princes Ice Hockey Club of Great Britain continued their streak from Switzerland, winning the Cup Chamonix ice hockey tournament in Chamonix, France.
- The play The Exchange by French dramatist Paul Claudel premiered at the Théâtre du Vieux-Colombier in Paris.
- Born: Sisowath Sirik Matak, Cambodian politician, member of the Cambodian royal family; in Phnom Penh, Kingdom of Cambodia, French Indochina (present-day Cambodia) (executed by Khmer Rouge, 1975)
- Died:
  - Mikhail Botkin, Russian artist, part of the famous Botkin family which included writer Vasily Botkin and physician Sergey Botkin (b. 1839)
  - Charles K. Hamilton, American aviator, survived over 60 crashes (b. 1881)
  - Neil Snow, American football player, fullback for the University of Michigan football team from 1898 to 1902 (b. 1879)

== January 23, 1914 (Friday) ==
- British shipping companies J. P. Corry & Company, Wm. Milburn & Company, Thos. B. Royden & Company and Tyser & Company amalgamated to become the Commonwealth and Dominion Line. The shipping line would be bought out by American-based Cunard Line but retained its operating independence, re-branding itself as Port Line Limited in 1937.
- The Church of England established the Diocese of St Edmundsbury and Ipswich and the Diocese of Sheffield in England.
- World Baseball Tour – In the only stopover in Asia outside of China and Japan, British tea magnate Thomas Lipton hosted the touring New York Giants and the Chicago White Sox team in Colombo, Ceylon (now Sri Lanka). The two teams also played five innings for a crowd of 5,000, with the Sox beating the Giants, 4–1.
- The Tsushima railroad opened in Aichi Prefecture, Japan, with stations Sukaguchi, Jimokuji, Shippō, Kida, Aotsuka, Shobata, Fujinami, Tsushima, Nishi Biwajima and Shinkawa serving the line.
- Born:
  - Louis, Prince Napoléon, pretender to the Imperial Throne of France of the Bonaparte dynasty from 1926 to his death; in Brussels, Kingdom of Belgium (d. 1997)
  - Alex Tremulis, American auto designer, designed the 1948 Tucker Sedan; as Alexander Tremulis, in Chicago, United States (d. 1991)
- Died: George W. Johnson, American singer and pioneer recording artist (b. 1850)

== January 24, 1914 (Saturday) ==
- Danish boxer Waldemar Holberg defeated Ray Bronson over 20 rounds in Melbourne, Australia and claimed the vacant World Welterweight Championship, only to lose the title 23 days later to Ireland's Tom McCormick after a sixth round foul, also at Melbourne.
- The opera Madeleine by American composer Victor Herbert premiered at the Metropolitan Opera in New York City. Herbert's second opera was not as well received as his operettas and musicals and dropped out of sight after six runs.
- Czech pianist Marie Dvořáková of the Organ School in Brno, Moravia performed the composition In the Mists by Czech composer Leoš Janáček for the first time in public.

== January 25, 1914 (Sunday) ==
- The United States Navy put the USS Montana on alert as unrest grew in Haiti. Towns north of the capital Port-au-Prince took up arms against the administration under president Michel Oreste.
- The Engelbrekt Church in Stockholm was completed. It remains one of the largest churches in the Swedish capital.
- World Figure Skating Championships – Hungarian figure skater Opika von Méray Horváth won gold in the women's competition, while skaters Ludowika and Walter Jakobsson of Finland won gold in the pairs competition.

== January 26, 1914 (Monday) ==
- The Alter Motor Car Company of Plymouth, Michigan was formed to construct an auto manufacturing plant. The company would produce 1,000 vehicles before going into receivership two years later.
- Belgian literary Nobel prize winner Maurice Maeterlinck's criticisms of the Catholic Church, including his vocal opposition to the Catholic Party anti-union stance in Belgium during a nation-wide labor dispute, motivated the Vatican to issue a decree to place his opera omnia on the Index Librorum Prohibitorum, a list for literary work banned by the Church.
- The Man Upstairs, a collection of short stories by P. G. Wodehouse, was published in the United Kingdom by Methuen & Co., London.
- Percy Jones became the first Welsh boxer to hold a world title, winning triple crown in British, European and World featherweight titles, against title holder Bill Ladbury. Jones outpointed Ladbury in a 20-round onslaught to win by decision.
- Born: Dürrüşehvar Sultan, Ottoman noble, daughter of Abdulmejid II, 29th and last Sultan of the Ottoman Empire; in Istanbul, Ottoman Empire (present-day Turkey) (d. 2006)
- Died:
  - Jane Morris, English model and artist, model for many of the Pre-Raphaelite Brotherhood artists (b. 1839)
  - Jose Gabriel del Rosario Brochero, Argentinian clergy, known for his work treating the sick and poor, in Argentina, canonized in 2016 (b. 1840)

== January 27, 1914 (Tuesday) ==
- Haiti president Michel Oreste abdicated and fled the country while USS Montana landed 150 Marines in Port-au-Prince to retain order. The reformist leader was pushed out by forces loyal to the landowning elite in the country.
- The Mutual Alliance Trust Company took over the National Reserve Bank in New York City.
- Born:
  - Anna Larina, revolutionary and wife to Bolshevik leader Nikolai Bukharin, author of This I Cannot Forget; in Russian Empire (present-day Russia) (d. 1996)
  - Bill Littlejohn, American animator, known for the Tom and Jerry cartoon shorts and Peanuts television specials; as William Littlejohn, in Newark, New Jersey, United States (d. 2010)
  - Teresa James, American aviator and one of the first Women Airforce Service Pilots; in Pittsburgh, United States (d. 2008)

== January 28, 1914 (Wednesday) ==
- Beverly Hills, California was incorporated as a city.
- Canadian suffragist Nellie McClung staged a mock play with fellow suffragists at the Walker Theatre in Winnipeg, Manitoba. The play ridiculed Manitoba Premier Rodmond Roblin's opposition to women receiving the vote. The women acted as Members of Parliament, with McClung playing the role of Premier, and held a mock debate about whether to give men the vote. The play was a success and helped advance the cause of women's suffrage. In January 1916, Manitoba became the first Canadian province to give women the right to vote.
- The USS Potomac, a tugboat commissioned by the United States Navy, left Newport, Rhode Island to assist in rescue of fishing vessels stranded in ice off the coast of Newfoundland.
- The first Millrose Games was held in Madison Square Garden in New York City, making it the longest running sports events ever held in the city's venue.
- The village of Clyde, Alberta was established.
- Died:
  - Shelby Moore Cullom, American politician, 17th Governor of Illinois, U.S. Senator from Illinois from 1883 till 1913 (b. 1829)
  - John J. McLaughlin, Canadian pharmacist, founder of Canada Dry ginger ale (b. 1865)

== January 29, 1914 (Thursday) ==
- An estimated 1,300 civilians were massacred by "bandit" soldiers under Bai Lang – known in media as the "White Wolf" – during the looting of Liuanchow in the Nganhwei Province, China.
- The British passenger ship Euripides, later renamed Akaroa, was launched at the Harland & Wolff shipyards in Belfast.
- U.S. President Woodrow Wilson directly wired cordial birthday wishes to Kaiser Wilhelm, the first time the United States and Germany exchanged messages using direct wireless communication.
- Pancho Villa formally confirmed he would not seek the presidency of Mexico should the revolution be successful, stating he continued to put his support behind General Venustiano Carranza should the revolutionary leader ever run for president: "As proof of my loyalty and as evidence that I have no ambition to become president, I would leave the country if he ordered me to do so."
- Yone Noguchi lectured on "The Japanese Hokku Poetry" at Magdalen College at Oxford at the invitation of poet laureate, Robert Bridges.
- Born: Bonnie Prudden, American activist, promoter of physical fitness during the Dwight D. Eisenhower administration and the formation of President's Council on Youth Fitness; as Ruth Alice Prudden, in New York City, United States (d. 2011)

== January 30, 1914 (Friday) ==
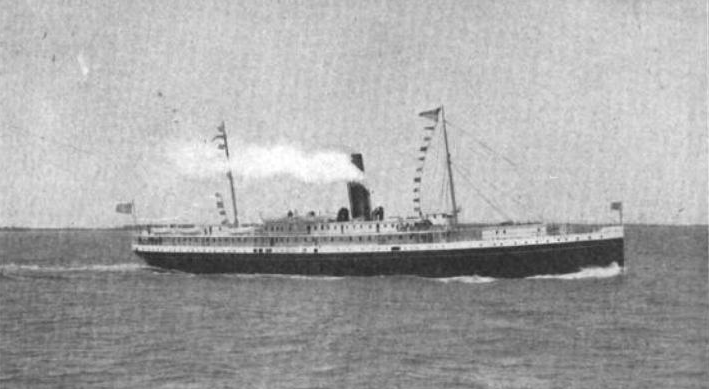
SS Monroe photographed 1903

- The ocean liner Monroe collided with Nantucket at 2 AM in the Atlantic Ocean 50 nautical miles (93 km) off the Virginia Capes, Virginia and sank with the loss of 41 of the 140 people on board. Survivors were rescued by Nantucket.
- An "explosion of fire-damp" in a colliery killed 22 miners and injured another 17 in Dortmund, Germany.
- Pancho Villa announced his army would be adopting more "civilized warfare," especially in relation to treating prisoners of war, after procuring a United States Army manual titled "The Ethics of International Warfare." The announcement was part of dialogue with New Mexico Governor William C. McDonald who visited Villa in Chihuahua City, Mexico in the aftermath of the border battle at Ojinaga.
- Russian chess master Alexander Alekhine won his first major Russian tournament, when he tied for first place with Aron Nimzowitsch in the 8th All-Russian Masters Tournament at Saint Petersburg. Afterward, they drew in a mini-match for first prize (they both won a game).
- The German operetta Alone at Last by composer Franz Lehár premiered at the Theater an der Wien.
- Born:
  - John Ireland, Canadian actor, known roles in Western films including My Darling Clementine, Red River and Gunfight at the O.K. Corral; in Vancouver, Canada (d. 1992)
  - David Wayne, American actor known for film roles in Adam's Rib and How to Marry a Millionaire; as Wayne James McKeekan, in Traverse City, Michigan, United States (d. 1995)
  - Elizabeth McCord, American painter, part of the hard-edge movement of the 1950s; in Dayton, Ohio, United States (d. 2008)
- Died: Paul Déroulède, French author and politician, author of patriotic poems such as Vive la France (b. 1846)

== January 31, 1914 (Saturday) ==
- Nearly 10,000 federal troops were dispatched to defend Torreón, Mexico from Pancho Villa's advancing army.
- The No. 6 Squadron for the Royal Flying Corps was established.
- The Art Gallery of Hamilton was founded in Hamilton, Ontario.
- The first issue of Direct Action was published in Sydney, Australia.
- Born:
  - Daya Mata, American religious leader, President of the Self-Realization Fellowship; as Rachel Faye Wright, in Salt Lake City, United States (d. 2010)
  - Jersey Joe Walcott, American boxer, 1947 world heavyweight champion; as Arnold Raymond Cream, in Pennsauken, New Jersey, United States (d. 1994)
  - Johannes Virolainen, Finnish state leader, 30th Prime Minister of Finland; in Viipurin maalaiskunta, Finland (present-day Russia) (d. 2000)
  - Sam Houston Johnson, American civil servant, younger brother of U.S. President Lyndon B. Johnson; in Johnson City, Texas, United States (d. 1978)
  - Carey Loftin, American actor and stuntman, played the unseen truck driver in Steven Spielberg's Duel; as William Carey Loftin, in Blountstown, Florida, United States (d. 1997)
- Died: James A. Beaver, American politician, 20th Governor of Pennsylvania (b. 1837)
