= List of shipwrecks in January 1914 =

The list of shipwrecks in January 1914 includes ships sunk, foundered, grounded, or otherwise lost during January 1914.

== 1 January ==
List of shipwrecks: 1 January 1914
Ship	State	Description
John J. Fallon	United States	The schooner went ashore at the entrance to the harbor at Boston, Massachusetts. Refloated and returned to service.

== 2 January ==
List of shipwrecks: 2 January 1914
Ship	State	Description
Nerok	Russia	The cargo ship was driven ashore near Rønne, Denmark with the loss of all but two of her crew. The vessel was built by Messrs Smith Dock Company Limited for Russia. One of the survivors was engineer John Joseph Hayes from South Bank, North Yorkshire, the other was an Imperial Russian Navy lieutenant named Bolimor.

== 3 January ==
List of shipwrecks: 3 January 1914
Ship	State	Description
Helen	United States	The gasoline sloop stranded near Sunset Rock one mile (1.6 km) south of the Narragansett Pier Life Saving Station in strong wind and high seas. Her captain, the only one on board, was rescued by the United States Life Saving Service just before the ship was flung onto rocks and broke up.

== 4 January ==
List of shipwrecks: 4 January 1914
Ship	State	Description
Oklahoma	United States	The tanker on her return trip to Port Arthur, Texas, in ballast ran into a strong gale approximately 60 nautical miles (110 km; 69 mi) southeast of Cape May, New Jersey and broke in two with the loss of one passenger and 25 of her 38 crew. The steamer Bavaria (Germany) rescued 8 survivors (39°07′N 73°45′W). Oklahoma's after half sank on its own; the revenue cutter USRC Seneca ( United States Revenue Cutter Service) shelled and sank her capsized forward half with 15 shots from a 6-pounder gun 15 nautical miles (28 km; 17 mi) southeast of Fenwick Island Light, Delaware, and recovered the bodies of three crew members from one of Oklahoma's lifeboats.
Seine	France	The cargo ship broke moorings at Herbillon, Algeria, while loading for Algiers. She went ashore and became a wreck. All on board were rescued.
Thomas Winsmore	United States	The three-masted schooner ran aground on the Lookout Shoal in the Atlantic Ocean off the coast of North Carolina and was wrecked. Her crew were rescued by USRC Seminole ( United States Revenue Cutter Service).

== 7 January ==
List of shipwrecks: 7 January 1914
Ship	State	Description
Cora	France	The schooner was driven ashore and wrecked on Chesil Beach, Dorset, United Kingdom.

== 10 January ==
List of shipwrecks: 10 January 1914
Ship	State	Description
Gina	Italy	The coaster sank at Bosa, Sardinia whilst discharging cargo.

== 11 January ==
List of shipwrecks: 11 January 1914
Ship	State	Description
Karluk	Canada	Canadian Arctic Expedition: After becoming trapped in ice in the Beaufort Sea on 13 August 1913 in a failed attempt to reach Herschel Island, subsequently drifting westward with the ice through the Beaufort Sea and into the Chukchi Sea, and being holed by the ice on 10 January 1914 and beginning to flood, the brigantine sank in the Chukchi Sea near Herald Island. Except for 11 who died during the ordeal, all aboard hiked across the ice to Wrangel Island, where the motor schooner King & Winge (United States) rescued them in September 1914.

== 13 January ==
List of shipwrecks: 13 January 1914
Ship	State	Description
Ajuricaba	Brazil	The cargo ship foundered in the Amazon River at Manaus.
Barge No. 788	United States	The barge went aground on shoals off Great Point, Nantucket Island, Massachusetts in fog and heavy seas after losing her towline to the tug Irvington (United States). Her crew was rescued by the United States Life Saving Service. Later pulled off by the tug Seabright (United States).
Cobequid	United Kingdom	The passenger ship ran aground in the Bay of Fundy 8 nautical miles (15 km) north east of Yarmouth, Nova Scotia, Canada. All on board were rescued.

== 14 January ==
List of shipwrecks: 14 January 1914
Ship	State	Description
Kenkon Maru XI	Japan	The cargo ship struck a rock at Harimoen Djawa and was wrecked. Her crew survived.

== 15 January ==
List of shipwrecks: 3 January 1914
Ship	State	Description
Greta	United States	The schooner was sunk in the western Nantucket Sound.
John Paul	United States	The schooner went ashore and sank 4 1/5 miles (6.8 km) west of the Cross Rip Lightship ( United States Lighthouse Service) (41°27′N 70°23′W).
Pathfinder	United States	The pilot boat was wrecked on rocks at Point Diablo, California two miles (3.2 km) west of the Fort Point Life Saving Station in dense fog. Her crew left in her two boats and was rescued by the United States Life Saving Service at sea. The next day she broke up during salvage efforts.

== 16 January ==
List of shipwrecks: 16 January 1914
Ship	State	Description
HMS A7	Royal Navy	The A-class submarine dived into the mud and sank in Whitesand Bay, Cornwall, England, with the loss of all 11 crew.

== 17 January ==
List of shipwrecks: 17 January 1914
Ship	State	Description
Spring	Norway	The cargo ship collided with another vessel and sank in Heltefjord.

== 21 January ==
List of shipwrecks: 21 January 1914
Ship	State	Description
Alexandra	United Kingdom	The cargo ship ran aground in the Atlantic Ocean 3 nautical miles (5.6 km) off Sagres, Portugal and was wrecked. Her crew were rescued.
Genr'l Adelbert Ames	United States	The schooner was wrecked one mile (1.6 km) east of the Monomoy Life-Saving Station in a gale, a total loss. Her crew was rescued by the United States Life Saving Service.

== 22 January ==
List of shipwrecks: 22 January 1914
Ship	State	Description
Levi S. Andrews	United States	The schooner was beached to prevent sinking near the north end of Parramore Island, Virginia, two miles (3.2 km) south east of the Wachapreague Life-Saving Station after becoming waterlogged due to a leak in rough weather. Her crew was rescued by the United States Life Saving Service. She was pulled off on 23 January just hours before a severe storm arrived.

== 25 January ==
List of shipwrecks: 25 January 1914
Ship	State	Description
Armenia	United Kingdom	The cargo ship ran aground on Goeree, Zeeland, Netherlands. She was refloated on 30 January.
San Antonio	Germany	The sailing ship ran aground off the coast of Morocco. She was refloated, repaired, and returned to service.

== 26 January ==
List of shipwrecks: 26 January 1914
Ship	State	Description
Hauto	United States	The barge sank in the East River at the foot of 135th Street, New York City.
Warrior	United States	The steam yacht grounded on the Colombian coast near the mouth of the Magdalena River, with no loss of life. She was refloated early in April.

== 27 January ==
List of shipwrecks: 27 January 1914
Ship	State	Description
Olive F. Hutchins	United States	The fishing schooner sank near Castle Island in the harbor of Boston, Massachusetts, after colliding with the George A. Hibbard.
Restless	United Kingdom	The schooner was run down and sunk in the Thames Estuary off Southend, Essex by the dredger Lord Desborough (United Kingdom) with the loss of three of her seven crew.
Sao Vicente	Brazil	The cargo ship sank.

== 28 January ==
List of shipwrecks: 28 January 1914
Ship	State	Description
Collier	United Kingdom	The steamship was wrecked at Morte Point, Devon.
Posidonia	United Kingdom	The seagrass dredge departed Fremantle, Western Australia on this date for Port Pirie, South Australia. Assumed to have been lost in a storm in the vicinity of Cape Leeuwin, with all hands.

== 30 January ==
List of shipwrecks: 30 January 1914
Ship	State	Description
Monroe	United States	The ocean liner collided with Nantucket (United States) in the Atlantic Ocean 50 nautical miles (93 km) (37°37′N 75°14′W) in 15 fathoms (90 ft; 27 m) of water off the Virginia Capes and sank with the loss of 19 passengers and 22 crew of the 140 people on board. Survivors were rescued by Nantucket. Wreck reduced to a clearance of 9 fathoms by USRC Onondaga.

== 31 January ==
List of shipwrecks: 31 January 1914
Ship	State	Description
Alice	United States	The 29-net register ton motor halibut schooner was stranded on a rock and became a total loss in Sumner Strait off Cape Pole, Territory of Alaska, on Kosciusko Island in the Alexander Archipelago in Southeast Alaska. Her crew of 11 survived.
Dinsdale	United States	The water boat was sunk in a collision in the main channel of upper New York Bay in 60 feet (18 m) of water. A large water pump was salvaged by the U.S. Survey boat Manisees (United States).
John Gilmore	United States	The schooner sank near Duck Island, Connecticut after her tow tug, Enterprise (United States), suffered rudder failure. Later raised.

== Unknown date ==
List of shipwrecks: Unknown date 1914
Ship	State	Description
Clara Bella	United Kingdom	The 130.6-foot (39.8 m), 299-ton steam trawler left port 21 January and vanished. Believed to have sunk off Iceland, possibly in February. Lost with all 13 hands.
Doris	United Kingdom	The 126.3-foot (38.5 m), 239-ton steam trawler left port 21 January and vanished, lost with all 10 hands. The body of her cook and debris washed ashore at Skye.
Jeanette	United States	The dredger was destroyed by fire at St. Louis, Missouri.
John Paul	United States	The schooner sank in a gale between 12 and 15 January in Nantucket Sound in 10 fathoms (60 ft; 18 m) of water 4 1/2 miles (7.2 km) east south east of the Hedge Fence light vessel. The wreck was leveled to a clearance of 7 fathoms (42 ft; 13 m) by USRC Acushnet ( United States Revenue-Marine) starting on 17 January and finished on 1 February.
Tapperheten	Swedish Navy	The Äran-class coastal defence ship ran aground on rocks near Stockholm. Refloated in July by blasting the rocks out from under her, repaired and returned to service by the end of 1915.
