= Paquita Jiménez =

Political activist and human rights defender (1958–2020)

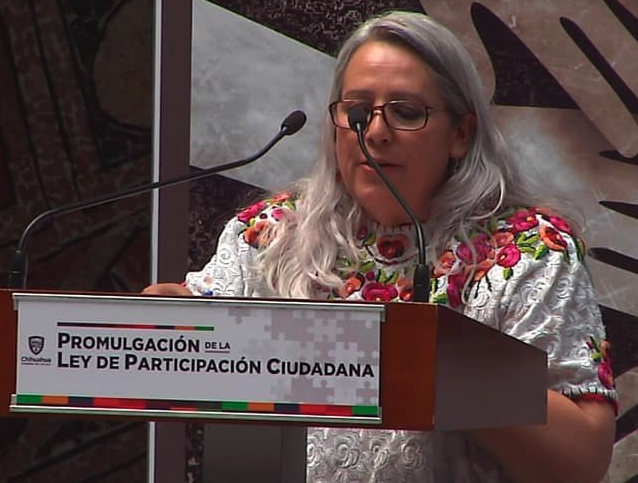

Personal details
- Born: Francisca Jiménez Barrientos; October 4, 1958 La Esmeralda, Ojinaga, Chihuahua
- Died: May 15, 2020 (aged 61) Chihuahua City, Chihuahua
- Education: Chihuahua Institute of Technology
- Nickname: Paquita

Francisca Jiménez Barrientos (October 4, 1958, in La Esmeralda, Ojinaga – May 15, 2020, in Chihuahua, Chihuahua) was a political activist, community organizer, and human rights defender. Coordinated for several years COSYDDHAC, the second human rights organization created in Mexico, in 2001 she participated in the founding of the Red por la Participación Ciudadana A.C. (Red Ciudadana) which was made up of six of the main organizations in the state of Chihuahua, Mexico. A member of the State Movement of Women Rights (Red Estatal de Mujeres) in Chihuahua whom made possible the visibility of the feminicide cases in Ciudad Juárez and Chihuahua, she also accompanied causes such as the demand for justice for the feminicide of Marisela Escobedo and the protests over the murder of the journalist Miroslava Breach. Promoter of legislative transparency, as well as the Law of Transparency and access to public information and the Law of Citizen Participation for the state of Chihuahua. Also participating in the defense of the original communities of the Sierra de Chihuahua.

== Biography ==
=== Early life and education ===
Jiménez was born in the community of La Esmeralda in the Municipality of Ojinaga on January 4, 1958, the eldest daughter of three brothers from the marriage of Anselmo Jiménez Mata and María Angela Barrientos Bermúdez, at the age of 8 she moved to Chihuahua capital, years later she studied the degree in commercial relations at the Technological Institute of Chihuahua.

=== Activism, demand and defense of Human Rights ===
At the beginning of the 1990s, once married and living in the Panorámico neighborhood, along with their neighbors El Saucito, Colinas del Sol, Diego Lucero and Arboledas neighborhoods, they organized to face the serious environmental problem caused by the installation of a plant of sewage treatment, which would benefit the recently created San Francisco Country Club, of 20 hectares that required that treated water, which began to be built in April of that year 1991 on the Izalco neighborhood, between Popocatépetl and Chichontepec streets, The same that gave off odors that impacted the children and young people of nearby schools as well as the neighbors, who fought from April 1991 to August 23, 1992 when the act was signed that determined that the hydraulic installation would be built away from that place. In 1992 he joined the Commission for Solidarity and Defense of Human Rights (COSYDDHAC), an organization that seeks to promote human rights and in particular the rights of indigenous peoples, documentation and defense of human rights violations, and channeling of particular cases for their defense. She was in charge of the coordination for 8 years. There she had the first contact with communities in the Sierra Tarahumara. She was the founder of the Red por la Participación Ciudadana A.C. in 2001, the organization that promoted the Law of Transparency and access to public information. Together with other organizations such as Plan Estrategico de Juárez, they promoted a new and advanced Law on Citizen Participation. She also contributed to the creation of the Chihuahuense Institute for Transparency and Access to Public Information (ICHITAIP), and the formation of the State Anti-Corruption System. Promoting public policies from various positions such as: Counselor who owns the Technical Advisory Council of the Federal Law of Promotion of CSO activities, member of the Citizen Committee for Electoral Reform, Counselor of the Advisory Council of the Chihuahuense Institute for Women, Electoral Counselor of the INE.

=== Chihuahua 2019 Plebiscite ===
In 2019, the municipal government of Chihuahua was forced to hold a plebiscite against the privatization of public lighting, Jimenéz was one of the applicants and promoters of the Chihuahua Plebiscite that achieved the citizen consultation with the greatest participation in the history of Mexico. She also participate as a speaker in various forums on the right to information, Líderes de América Latina; Participation and Democracy, among others, being recognized for her trajectory promoting processes of construction of citizenship, citizen participation and in the defense of Human Rights Defenders.

=== Death ===
Jiménez died in the city of Chihuahua on May 15, 2020, at the age of 62 after having fought against pancreatic cancer.
