= Potrero del Llano =

Potrero del Llano may refer to:

- SS Potrero del Llano, an oil tanker built in 1912
- Potrero del Llano, Chihuahua, a rural community in Chihuahua, Mexico
