= El Oasis =

Coordinates: 29°01′34″N 104°38′58″W

El Oasis is a rural community in Ojinaga Municipality, Chihuahua, Mexico. As of the 2010 census, El Oasis had a population of 475 inhabitants. The community is situated at an elevation of 1,204 meters above sea level.
