= Battle of Ojinaga =

1914 Mexican Revolution battle

- Part of the Mexican Revolution
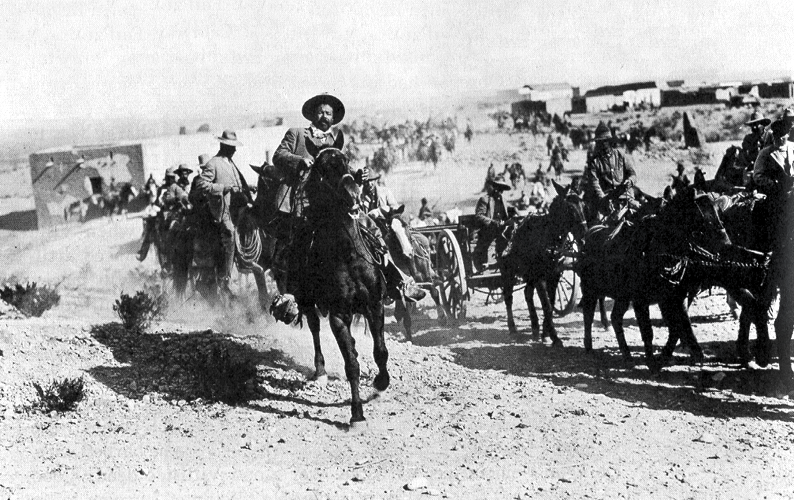
- Pancho Villa and Siete Leguas in front of their Dorados
Date	10–11 January 1914
Location	Ojinaga, Chihuahua 29°33′0″N 104°24′0″W
Result	Revolutionary victory

Belligerents
Constitutionalists: División del Norte	Government: Federal Army

Commanders and leaders
Pancho Villa	Salvador Mercado; Pascual Orozco

Strength
5,500	4,500

Casualties and losses
35	3,500

The Battle of Ojinaga, also known as the Taking of Ojinaga, was one of the battles of the Mexican Revolution and was fought on January 11, 1914. The conflict put an end to the last stronghold of the Federal Army in Northern Mexico.

After the rebel Generals Toribio Ortega Ramírez and Pánfilo Natera García could not finish the place off, Pancho Villa arrived in Ojinaga with a large army, thus displacing the forces of Salvador Mercado from the city. The bodies had to be burned to prevent a typhus epidemic.

== Background ==
The first phase of the revolution, which began in 1910, ended with the victory of the revolutionaries: President Porfirio Díaz, who resigned in 1911, was later replaced by the revolutionary Francisco Ignacio Madero. However, in early 1913, with the help of the betrayal of Victoriano Huerta, the followers of the old system murdered Madero, and Huerta became the new president. Against him, a nationwide coalition developed among former revolutionaries and Governor Venustiano Carranza of Coahuila appointed himself commander-in-chief of the entire uprising.

Villa returned to Mexico with only 8 companions from the United States in the spring, but as the months passed, more and more people joined him and acquired more and more weapons. After being appointed head of the revolutionary movement in Chihuahua, Pancho Villa reorganized the Northern Division, thus having more than 5,000 men integrating troops of infantry, cavalry and artillery weapons, in addition to having support services such as health, transportation and food. After fighting several battles, they captured Ciudad Juárez and moved on to Chihuahua. In order to take the city of Chihuahua, Francisco Villa pressured the federals in a battle, finishing these troops. The city became chaos and was sacked by Pascual Orozco's troops, so General Salvador Mercado ordered the evacuation of the city at the end of November 1913 and headed for Ojinaga, a border point with the United States, which allowed Villa to occupy the state capital on December 8 of the same year. General Mercado withdrew from the city of Chihuahua, for the interests of businessmen who saw in the federal forces a security for their money against the constitutionalists. When leaving for Ojinaga, Mercado refused to start combat with the villistas, foreseeing that if Pancho Villa pursued him to the border, he would be helped by the North Americans and thus could return to the capital of the country.

Villa first sent Panfilo Natera's forces to occupy Ojinaga. On 31 December 1913, they arrived near the town, which was protected by Mercado's 4,500-strong force, including no less than 12 generals. On Villa's advice, Natera tried night attacks for three days, then attacked again at dawn on January 4, but had to retreat due to a counterattack by José Inés Salazar's horsemen, and even 130 revolutionaries were captured and immediately shot dead by the Huertists. Natera's camp was then weakened by internal debates.

The defeated troops informed Pancho Villa in the afternoon of the situation, who in those days was preoccupied not only with military issues but also with an unusual topic: his men negotiated with American film companies and offered to watch and film Villa's operations in exchange for part of their proceeds, in addition to receiving horse and food during this time. Only one company showed interest in the offer: Mutual Film, led by Harry Aitken: a contract was signed with them on January 5, stipulating that revolutionaries would receive an advance of $25,000 and a fifth of subsequent revenues. The contract was signed in El Paso, in the absence of Villa, by Eugenio Aguirre Benavides, and on behalf of the other party by Gunther Lessing, a lawyer, on behalf of Thayer. The Huertist newspaper El País wrote about the case of Villa “speculating on the blood of Mexicans.”

When Villa learned of the defeat of the Naterá in Ciudad Juárez on the January 4, he immediately began to prepare for another attack. While Rosalío Hernández put a brigade called Leales de Camargo on standby, Villa telegraphed Maclovio Herrera to the south by telegram and then took a train to Chihuahua on January 5 at 2pm in the company of Raúl Madero and Luis Aguirre Benavides. From there, they continued their journey on a railway line that was not yet fully completed, and then on horseback in the extreme cold. There were a total of 1,500 of them, traveling without food for three days, eating the meat of cattle procured from the area without salt. When Villa appeared in the San Juan hacienda, where the division camped, enthusiasm immediately increased.

== The battle ==
On January 10, at 6 a.m., the trumpet sounded and a review began. Ammunition was distributed, approx. 200 pieces, and then the assembling military council ordered them to approach the city out of range. The task of the brigades of Hernández, Toribio Ortega, and Herrera was to lock Ojinaga in a semicircle, leaving only the side facing the United States free. It was planned that the attack would be carried out without a hat, the password would be the individual number, and whoever ran away from them would be shot.

In the evening, the attackers took up their positions, the artillery was located 2,500 meters from the settlement. The next day, with tense anticipation, they prepared for a night attack. About 700 of Natera's men, the Morelos and Contreras brigades, were left in reserve. The fight started around 6 in the evening, the two halves starting to shoot each other with cannons and rifles. Herrera and Hernández's men penetrated the city through the cemetery, in the direction of the watchtower, to squeeze the defenders toward the Río Bravo border river, while in the north, Trinidad Rodríguez approached from a ranch called San Francisco. During his attack, some villagers infiltrated the city and moved aside to climb the church bell tower. In a matter of hours, the revolutionaries swept away the defense of the city, the Confederates fled their rifles, threw themselves into the river, and tried to swim across to the other side, the Texas Presidium.

With the taking of Ojinaga, the constitutionalist struggle was able to secure the northern border by focusing its struggle on the interior of the country.

== Aftermath ==
Pascual Orozco, an ally associated with Shafter, fled to San Antonio, where his wife was waiting, but many of the fugitives were arrested in the United States. 3352 soldiers (including 8 generals) and 1607 women accused of violating the Neutrality Act were captured and transported first to Marfa and then to Fort Bliss.

Only 35 of the revolutionary army lost their lives, and the loot was enormous: they also acquired 14 cannons, 100,000 rounds of ammunition, and 2,000 Mauser rifles. It is conceivable, but not at all certain, that the American writer Ambrose Bierce, who was with the revolutionaries, also lost his life in the battle of Ojinaga.

Films made in those days were soon shown in New York, but nothing from the battle was visible. The show was also attended by the father of the Madero brothers, who didn't even know Raúl's son was involved in the fighting, but he discovered him in the film. The discovery uncomfortably affected him, and his other son, Alfonso, had to reassure him.

== Personalities involved in the battle ==
- Ambrose Bierce
- Enrique Creel
- John J. Pershing
- John Reed
- Luis Terrazas

== Bibliography ==
- Taibo, Paco Ignacio (2007). Pancho Villa: Una biografía narrativa (in Spanish) (1st ed.). Barcelona: Editorial Planeta. ISBN 9788408073147. OCLC 433362298.
