= Victor Leaton Ochoa =

Mexican American revolutionary and inventor (1850–1945)

Victor Leaton Ochoa (1850 Chihuahua, Mexico – 1945 Sinaloa, Mexico) was a Mexican American revolutionary, journalist, union leader, miner and inventor. He is best known for his invention of the Ochoaplane, an early version of the pen and pencil clip an adjustable wrench and a windmill. He also participated in a fight to overthrow Mexican dictator Porfirio Díaz in the early 1890s.

== Biography ==
Ochoa was born in Ojinaga, Chihuahua, Mexico in 1850 and was of Spanish and Scottish descent. His exact date of birth is unknown. His father was Juan Ochoa, who was a customs collector in Presidio, Texas and owned a large lumber mill in Fort Davis, Texas. Ochoa has a brother named Esteban. His grandfather was Benjamin Leaton, who was a captain in the Federal army and settled on the family property of the Ochoas. He also remodelled an old Spanish mission into a fort, until the government took it over and named it Fort Leaton. Victor Ochoa later moved to Texas, then New York and New Jersey, eventually becoming a U.S. citizen in 1889. Ochoa was also a journalist who founded El Hispano American and El Correo del Bravo. He was opposed to the dictatorship of Porfirio Díaz, who had been in rule of Mexico from 1876 to 1911. Ochoa became involved in a fight by Mexican rebels to overthrow Porfirio Díaz in the 1890s. After this incident, Diaz put a bounty on Ochoa's head for $50,000, "dead or alive". For his illegal actions, a federal warrant was issued for his arrest and was sought by the U.S. Marshall Service and Believed to be the one who organised the fight. In 1894, Ochoa was arrested for his revolutionary activities, where he was supplying and hiring Mexican dissidents in El Paso, Texas, which violated the United States's neutrality laws. In the fall of 1894, Pecos County Sheriff A. J. Royal and Texas Ranger James W. Fulgham arrested Victor Ochoa as they were rounding up suspected horse thieves. He was put in the Pecos County jail and promptly escaped. Eventually, he was found and returned to El Paso. He was sentenced to two years in federal prison at Kings County Penitentiary in Brooklyn and had his U.S. citizenship stripped, but had it restored by President Theodore Roosevelt in 1906. As committed to his revolutionary ideals, he was also committed to inventing. He worked with Watson E. Coleman, who was a solicitor for patents, who helped him file for and obtain patents in other countries such as Czechoslovakia, France, Germany, Great Britain, Japan, Mexico, Netherlands, Poland and Spain. He is recognised by the Smithsonian Institution for his work.

== Death ==
He died in Sinaloa of natural causes at 95.

== Inventions ==
=== Ochoaplane ===
Ochoa is the inventor of the Ochoaplane around 1908–1911, one of the first airplanes ever built. It had collapsable wings and flew as an ornithopter, with 6 wings that flapped like a bird's. Ochoa believed he had solved the problem with flight at this time.

=== Adjustable wrench ===
Ochoa invented an adjustable wrench in 1921 as an improvement for turning pipes, nuts and bolts.

=== Electric brake ===
In 1907, Ochoa was granted a U.S. patent for an electric brake intended to stop railway cars or trains using magnetic attraction. This brake system is still used in modern vehicles.

=== Pen and pencil clip ===
Ochoa had invented the early version of the pen and pencil clip and sold the patent to Waterman Co. in 1900. He also patented a pen and pencil clip for holding them in a pocket. In 1907 he sold that patent to the American Pen and Pencil Co.

=== Windmill ===
Ochoa invented an improvement of windmills intended to obtain electricity in a storage battery by installing a dynamo on the windmill. With this amount of electricity, it would be able to power a house or run small motors.
