= Maijoma =

Community in Chihuahua, Mexico

Coordinates: 28°54′57″N 104°24′32″W

Maijoma is a rural community located in Ojinaga Municipality, Chihuahua, Mexico. It had a population of 160 inhabitants at the 2010 census, and is situated at an elevation of 1,382 meters above sea level.
