= 1911 Les Avants Ice Hockey Tournament =

The 1911 Les Avants Tournament was an international ice hockey tournament held in Les Avants, Switzerland from January 13–15, 1911. Five teams participated in the tournament, which was won by the Oxford Canadians.

== Results ==
=== Final Table ===
Pl.		GP	W	T	L	Goals	Pts
1.	(Canada) Oxford Canadians	4	4	0	0	58:1	8
2.	(Germany) Berliner Schlittschuhclub	4	3	0	1	18:14	6
3.	(United Kingdom) Prince's Ice Hockey Club	4	2	0	2	27:18	4
4.	(Switzerland) Club des Patineurs Lausanne	4	1	0	3	8:30	2
5.	(Belgium) Fédération des Patineurs de Belgique	4	0	0	4	3:51	0

== See also ==
1914 Les Avants Ice Hockey Tournament
