= Ojinaga =

Town in the Mexican state of Chihuahua

- Town
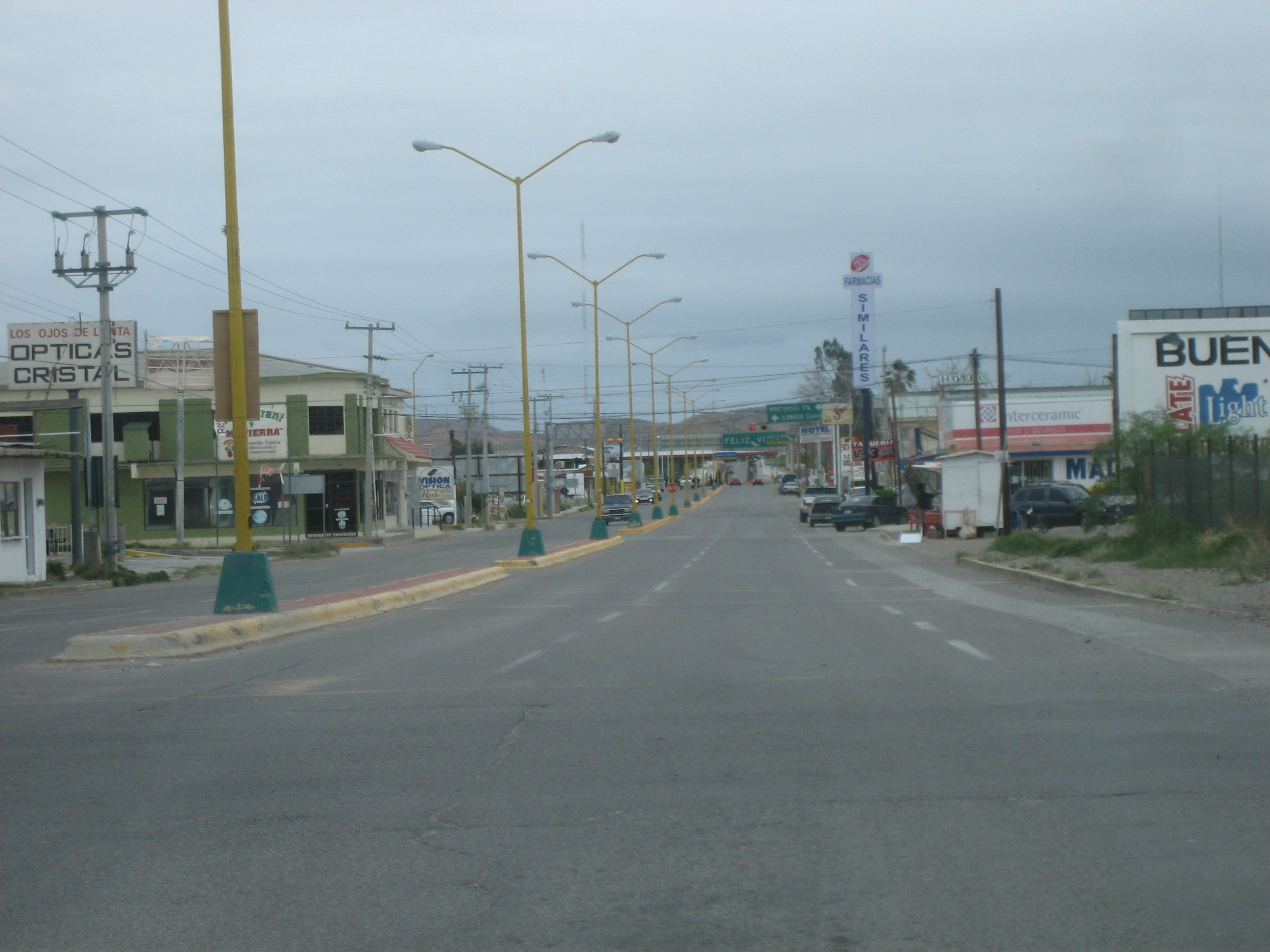
- North to border crossing on Blv. Libre Comercio in Ojinaga

- Location in Mexico
- Coordinates: 29°33′52″N 104°24′59″W
- Country: Mexico
- State: Chihuahua
- Municipality: Ojinaga
- Elevation: 800 m (2,600 ft)

Population (2015)
  - Total: 28,040

Ojinaga (Manuel Ojinaga) is a town and seat of the municipality of Ojinaga, in the northern Mexican state of Chihuahua. As of 2015, the town had a total population of 28,040. It is a rural border town on the U.S.–Mexico border, with the city of Presidio, Texas, directly opposite, on the U.S. side of the border. Ojinaga is situated where the Río Conchos drains into the Río Grande (known as the Rio Bravo in Mexico), an area called La Junta de los Rios. Presidio and Ojinaga are connected by the Presidio–Ojinaga International Bridge and the Presidio–Ojinaga International Rail Bridge.

== History ==
Ojinaga was founded around AD 1200 by the Pueblo Native Americans, who were later assimilated by Uto-Aztecan speakers. Ojinaga was first visited by Spanish explorers (led by Álvar Núñez Cabeza de Vaca) in 1535. (See La Junta Indians)

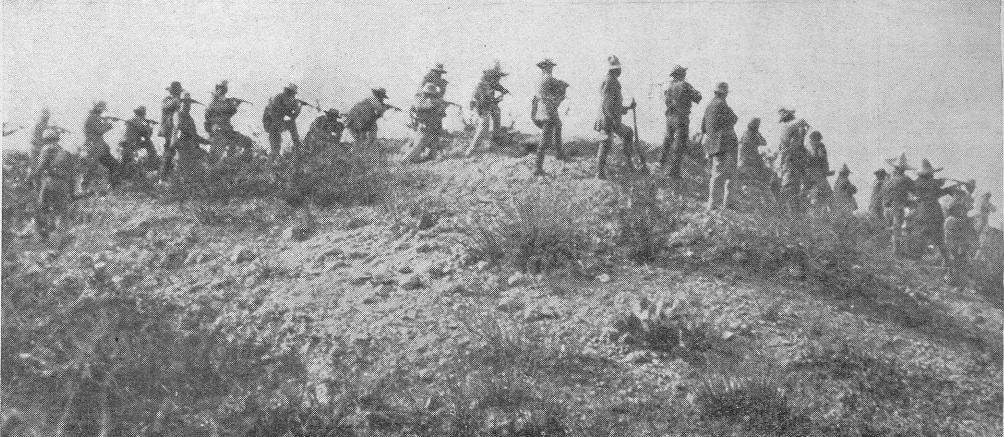
Battle in Ojinaga with General Toribio Ortega's troops opening fire on federals.

During the Mexican Revolution, Ojinaga was the scene of the Battle of Ojinaga between Pancho Villa's revolutionaries and government troops under Pascual Orozco. Orozco's defeat here after a long military campaign led to his exile in the United States. The U.S. writer Ambrose Bierce may have died there, although that is uncertain.

== Culture ==
Ojinaga still retains its rural culture and environment, with relatively little pollution and few urban problems. Some of the most famous norteño-sax artists are from Ojinaga, such as Los Jilgueros del Arroyo, Conjunto Primavera, Los Rieleros del Norte, Polo Urías, Los Norteños de Ojinaga, and Los Diamantes de Ojinaga.

== Geography ==
=== Location ===
Because of its location on the Río Grande border between Chihuahua and the U.S. state of Texas, Ojinaga is often a station for narcotic smuggling and illegal immigration. The creation of the "La Entrada al Pacífico" or "The Entrance to the Pacific", has made Ojinaga and Presidio, Texas, into a proposed inland trade corridor between the two countries. The route extends into Odessa-Midland, Texas. Several changes have also had to be made to the port of entry in Presidio, Texas, to accommodate the growing amount of traffic crossing the border. Truck lanes for heavy vehicles have also been added.

== Climate ==
Climate data for Ojinaga (1991–2020)
Month	Jan	Feb	Mar	Apr	May	Jun	Jul	Aug	Sep	Oct	Nov	Dec	Year
Record high °C (°F)	33.0 (91.4)	35.0 (95.0)	38.5 (101.3)	42.0 (107.6)	45.5 (113.9)	50.0 (122.0)	49.0 (120.2)	49.0 (120.2)	45.0 (113.0)	41.0 (105.8)	39.5 (103.1)	32.0 (89.6)	50.0 (122.0)
Mean daily maximum °C (°F)	20.0 (68.0)	23.6 (74.5)	27.9 (82.2)	32.3 (90.1)	37.0 (98.6)	40.0 (104.0)	38.7 (101.7)	38.1 (100.6)	35.0 (95.0)	31.2 (88.2)	23.3 (73.9)	20.1 (68.2)	30.6 (87.1)
Daily mean °C (°F)	10.9 (51.6)	14.1 (57.4)	18.1 (64.6)	22.6 (72.7)	27.5 (81.5)	31.4 (88.5)	30.9 (87.6)	30.6 (87.1)	27.6 (81.7)	22.7 (72.9)	14.4 (57.9)	11.2 (52.2)	21.8 (71.2)
Mean daily minimum °C (°F)	1.9 (35.4)	4.5 (40.1)	8.4 (47.1)	12.8 (55.0)	18.0 (64.4)	22.7 (72.9)	23.2 (73.8)	23.2 (73.8)	20.2 (68.4)	14.1 (57.4)	5.5 (41.9)	2.2 (36.0)	13.1 (55.6)
Record low °C (°F)	−7.0 (19.4)	−12.0 (10.4)	−2.5 (27.5)	−2.0 (28.4)	4.0 (39.2)	10.0 (50.0)	7.0 (44.6)	12.0 (53.6)	9.0 (48.2)	−5.0 (23.0)	−7.0 (19.4)	−9.0 (15.8)	−12.0 (10.4)
Average precipitation mm (inches)	10.9 (0.43)	9.5 (0.37)	6.5 (0.26)	5.0 (0.20)	15.1 (0.59)	23.9 (0.94)	39.2 (1.54)	30.9 (1.22)	31.9 (1.26)	22.0 (0.87)	11.3 (0.44)	8.2 (0.32)	214.4 (8.44)
Average precipitation days (≥ 0.1 mm)	2.0	1.5	1.3	1.0	2.5	3.3	5.0	4.4	4.5	2.9	2.0	1.8	32.2
Source: Servicio Meteorologico Nacional

== Economy ==
Ojinaga serves as a support center and market community for the surrounding area. Though it is on the border Ojinaga has drawn little benefit from maquiladoras. Selkirk has a plant which makes chimney, venting and air distribution products and Solitaire Homes has established a factory for prefabricated homes. There are about 15,000 acres (60 km^{2}) used for agriculture, the largest area being cattle pasture, with the main crops soy, cotton, corn, wheat, onions, peanuts, cantaloupes and vegetables. There are mineral deposits which consist of lead, silver, coal, zinc, manganese, marble and uranium.

== Notable people ==
- Conjunto Primavera - Norteño-sax band
- Luz María Aguilar - Actress
- Los Rieleros del Norte - Norteño-sax band
- Norteños de Ojinaga - Norteño-sax band
- Pablo Acosta - Drug lord
- Polo Urías - Norteño-sax singer
- Victor Leaton Ochoa - Revolutionary and inventor

== In popular culture ==
Ojinaga is featured in the novel Streets of Laredo by Larry McMurtry as the hometown of Maria, the midwife of Ojinaga and mother of Joey Garza.

== See also ==
- Ojinaga Cut
