= La Esmeralda, Chihuahua =

Coordinates: 29°34′54″N 104°27′43″W

La Esmeralda is a rural community in Ojinaga Municipality, Chihuahua, Mexico. It had a population of 187 inhabitants in the 2010 census, and is situated at an elevation of 794 meters above sea level.
