= Ojinaga Municipality =

Municipality in the Mexican state of Chihuahua

Ojinaga
- Municipality
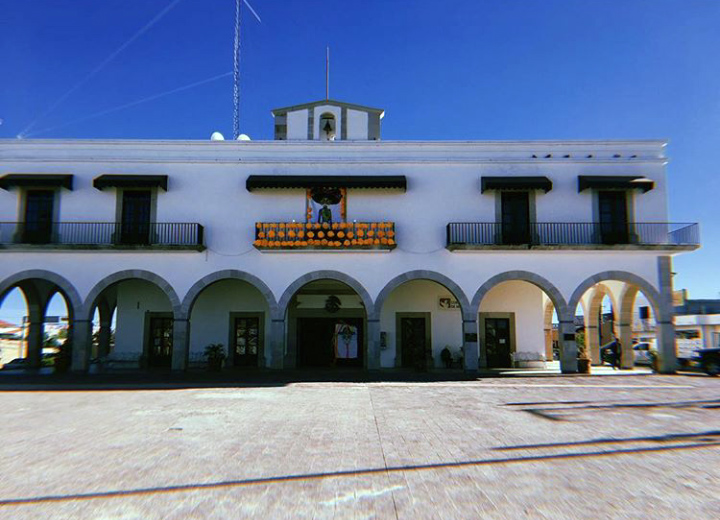
- Ojinaga government headquarters
- Nickname: La perla del desierto
- Municipality of Ojinaga in Chihuahua

- Location in Mexico
- Coordinates: 29°34′N 104°25′W
- Country: Mexico
- State: Chihuahua
- Municipal seat: Ojinaga

Area
  - Total: 9,500.5 km^{2} (3,668.2 sq mi)

Population (2010)
  - Total: 26,304
  - Density: 2.7687/km^{2} (7.1709/sq mi)

Ojinaga Municipality (formally: Manuel Ojinaga ) is one of the 67 municipalities of Chihuahua, in northern Mexico. The municipal seat lies at Ojinaga, a rural bordertown on the U.S.-Mexico border. The municipality has an area of 9,500.50 km^{2} (3,668.16 sq mi).

== Geography ==
Ojinaga, named after Juarista governor Manuel Ojinaga, reported a 2010 census population of 22,744 people in the town, which serves as municipal seat of the municipality of 26,304 inhabitants. The municipality includes numerous very small outlying communities, the largest of which are El Oasis and Nueva Holanda.

=== Towns and villages ===
The municipality has 108 localities. The largest are:

Name	2010 Census Population
Ojinaga	22,744
El Oasis	475
Nueva Holanda	426
La Esmeralda	187
Maijoma	160
Valverde	143
El Divisadero	135
El Mezquite	120
Potrero del Llano	129
Total Municipality	26,304

=== Adjacent municipalities and counties ===
- Manuel Benavides Municipality – southeast
- Camargo Municipality – south
- Julimes Municipality – southwest
- Aldama Municipality – southwest
- Coyame del Sotol Municipality – west
- Guadalupe Municipality – northwest
- Presidio County, Texas – north and northeast
