= 1914 Les Avants Ice Hockey Tournament =

The 1914 Les Avants Tournament was an international ice hockey tournament held in Les Avants, Switzerland from January 16-18, 1914. Five teams participated in the tournament, which was won by Prince's Ice Hockey Club of Great Britain.

== Results ==
=== Final Table ===
Pl.		GP	W	T	L	Goals	Pts
1.	(United Kingdom) Prince's Ice Hockey Club	4	4	0	0	34:1	8
2.	(Germany) Berliner Schlittschuhclub	4	2	1	1	21:7	5
3.	(Bohemia) Ceská sportovní spolecnost	4	2	1	1	20:2	5
4.	(Switzerland) Club des Patineurs Lausanne	4	1	0	3	5:24	2
5.	(Belgium) Brussels Ice Hockey Club	4	0	0	4	1:47	0

== See also ==
1911 Les Avants Ice Hockey Tournament
