= Potrero del Llano, Chihuahua =

Coordinates: 29°12′44″N 104°26′36″W

Potereo de Llano is a rural community located in Ojinaga Municipality, Chihuahua, Mexico. It had a population of 120 inhabitants at the 2010 census, and is situated at an elevation of 1,040 meters above sea level.
