= HMS A7 =

Submarine of the Royal Navy

Coordinates: 50°19′45″N 04°18′25″W

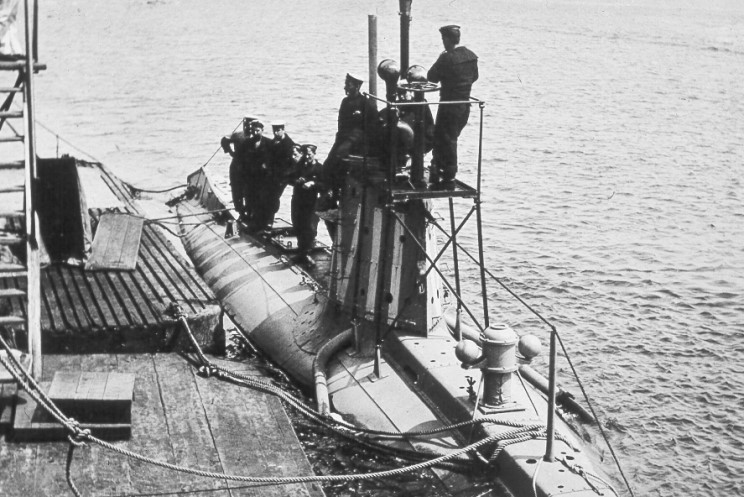
- HMS A7

History

United Kingdom
- Name: HMS A7
- Builder: Vickers Barrow-in-Furness
- Laid down: 19 February 1903
- Launched: 23 January 1905
- Commissioned: 16 January 1905
- Fate: Sunk in Whitsand Bay, 16 January 1914

General characteristics
- Class & type: A-class submarine
- Displacement: 190 long tons (193 t) surfaced; 206 long tons (209 t) submerged
- Length: 105 ft (32.0 m)
- Beam: 12 ft 9 in (3.9 m)
- Draught: 10 ft 8 in (3.3 m)
- Installed power: 550 bhp (410 kW) (petrol engine); 150 hp (110 kW) (electric motor)
- Propulsion: 1 × 16-cylinder Wolseley petrol engine; 1 × electric motor
- Speed: 11 knots (20 km/h; 13 mph) surfaced; 7 knots (13 km/h; 8.1 mph) submerged
- Range: 500 nautical miles (930 km; 580 mi) at 10 kn (19 km/h; 12 mph) surfaced
- Complement: 2 officers and 9 ratings
- Armament: 2 × 18-inch (45 cm) torpedo tubes

HMS A7 was an A-class submarine built for the Royal Navy in the first decade of the 20th century. She sank in a training accident in 1914 with the loss of her entire crew. Efforts to salvage her failed and her wreck is a protected site. Diving on her is prohibited without a licence from the Ministry of Defence.

== Design and description ==
A7 was a member of the first British class of submarines, although slightly larger, faster and more heavily armed than the lead ship, HMS A1. The submarine had a length of 105 feet 1 inch (32.0 m) overall, a beam of 12 feet 9 inches (3.9 m) and a mean draught of 10 feet 8 inches (3.3 m). They displaced 190 long tons (190 t) on the surface and 206 long tons (209 t) submerged. The A-class submarines had a crew of 2 officers and 9 ratings.

For surface running, the boats were powered by a single 16-cylinder 550-brake-horsepower (410 kW) Wolseley petrol engine that drove one propeller shaft. When submerged the propeller was driven by a 150-horsepower (112 kW) electric motor. They could reach 11 knots (20 km/h; 13 mph) on the surface and 7 knots (13 km/h; 8.1 mph) underwater. On the surface, A7 had a range of 500 nautical miles (930 km; 580 mi) at 10 knots (19 km/h; 12 mph); submerged the boat had a range of 30 nautical miles (56 km; 35 mi) at 5 knots (9.3 km/h; 5.8 mph).

The boats were armed with two 18-inch (45 cm) torpedo tubes in the bow. They could carry a pair of reload torpedoes, but generally did not as doing so that they had to compensate for their weight by an equivalent weight of fuel.

== Construction and career ==
A7 was ordered as part of the 1903–04 Naval Programme from Vickers. She was laid down at their shipyard in Barrow-in-Furness on 1 September 1903, launched on 21 January 1905 and completed on 13 April. She sank in Whitsand Bay, Cornwall on 16 January 1914 with the loss of her crew whilst carrying out dummy torpedo attacks on Pygmy in conjunction with submarine A9. A disturbance in the water was seen which was thought to be caused by the crew of A7 attempting to blow water from her ballast tanks in a desperate attempt to reach the surface. The location was marked with a buoy and Pygmy returned to Plymouth Sound to report on the disaster. Pygmy returned to the site in the afternoon but was unable to locate the buoy as the weather had deteriorated. It then took five days to relocate the submarine, she was found in 121 ft (37 m) depth with 20 ft (6.1 m) of her stern buried in the muddy seabed and with her bow 33 ft (10 m) off the bottom, raised at an angle of 30°. Several attempts were made to salvage her over the next month by attaching a hawser to the towing eye on the bow or wrapping steel hawsers around her hull, but her stern was too deeply embedded in the mud and the hawsers parted without pulling her out. She lies today where she sank, buried up to her waterline in a flat, mud seabed in about 121 ft (37 m) of water. In 2001, she was declared as one of 16 wrecks in British waters designated as "Controlled Sites" under the Protection of Military Remains Act by the British Government and which cannot be dived without special permission.

In 2014 the SHIPS Project team in Plymouth completed an archaeological investigation of the A7 submarine, having been granted a licence by the UK Ministry of Defence.
