= Thomas Winsmore (schooner) =

American trading ship

Coordinates: 38.790218°N 75.161762°W

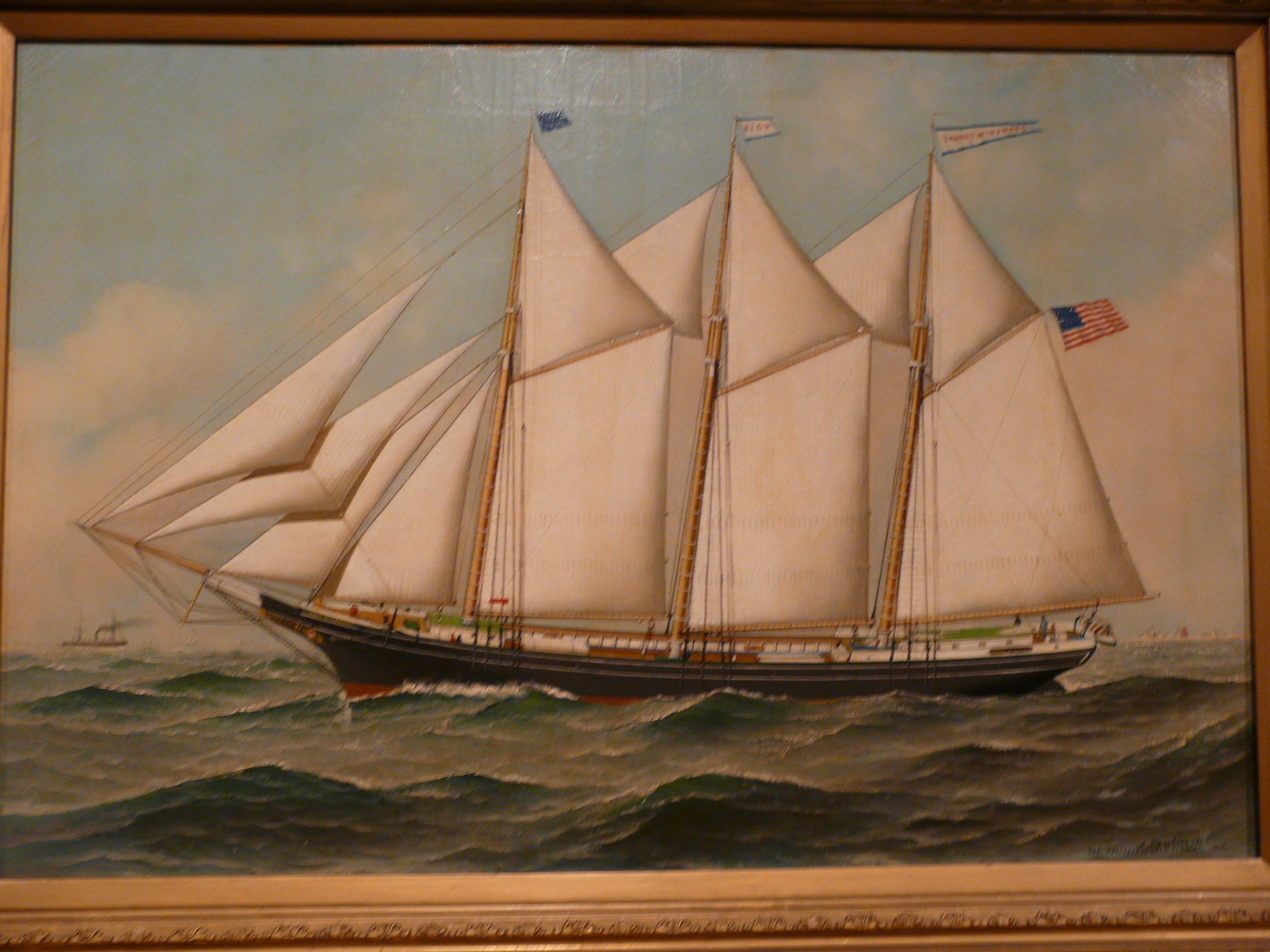

History

United States
- Name: Thomas Winsmore
- Namesake: Thomas Winsmore, of the ship chandlery Cain & Winsmore
- Builder: Built on the Broadkill River, Milton, Delaware, by C.C. Davidson
- Launched: December 15, 1890
- Home port: Philadelphia
- Identification: US Official Number 145575; Call sign KJGB
- Fate: Abandoned in a storm off the coast of Florida, December 1915

General characteristics
- Class & type: Three-masted schooner
- Tonnage: 435 GRT; 381 NRT
- Tons burthen: 414 tons
- Length: 144 ft 4 in (43.99 m)
- Beam: 34 ft 2 in (10.41 m)
- Depth: 10 ft 6 in (3.20 m)

Thomas Winsmore was an 1890 schooner that sailed in the coastwise trade, bringing coal from Philadelphia to northern ports, and returning with cargoes of lumber. According to one source, the ship operated free of mishaps for almost 22 years. However, the ship was known for its "troublesome" crew; and in one instance, it appears a fight resulted in the death of one crew member, Jack Kalfus.

The ship's namesake was Thomas Winsmore, of the ship chandlery Cain & Winsmore.

== Rescue by Revenue Cutter Seminole in 1914 ==
A report from the United States Revenue Cutter Service describes one of the accidents that marked the end of 22 years of safe operation, when Thomas Winsmore went aground near Lookout Shoal, off the North Carolina coast:

The three-masted schooner Thomas Winsmore, on January 4, 1914, was in a predicament where the services of a revenue cutter were needed about as badly as ever happens. In a stiff westerly gale, with both anchors down and dragging on a lee shore, rolling heavily in a cross sea, deck load shifted, and 5 feet of water in the hold, it seemed that this schooner's end was close at hand. In addition to all these troubles, the captain feared that his crew would mutiny. Fortunately the revenue cutter Seminole observed the plight of the schooner and went immediately to her assistance. An attempt to shoot a line on board the distressed vessel proved futile, owing to the high wind. The sea was too rough to lower the surfboat, but by a liberal use of oil the cutter was enabled to get a 4-inch line on board, by means of which a 10-inch hawser was secured to the schooner. In a short time the unfortunate vessel was towed to a safe anchorage, and arrangements were made to send an armed boat's crew to assist the master of the schooner in the event his crew should again become troublesome.

== Abandonment ==
Thomas Winsmore was abandoned in a storm off the coast of Florida in December 1915.
