= SS Oklahoma (1908) =

20th US steam tanker

History

United States
- Name: Oklahoma
- Namesake: Oklahoma
- Owner: J. M. Guffey Petroleum Co. (1908-1913); Gulf Refining Company (1913-1914)
- Builder: New York Shipbuilding Co., Camden
- Yard number: 53
- Laid down: 1907
- Launched: 29 February 1908
- Sponsored by: Miss Mildred Fessenden Taber
- Commissioned: 25 April 1908
- Maiden voyage: 7 May 1908
- Home port: Port Arthur
- Identification: US Official Number 205040; Call sign KWNH
- Fate: Sank, 4 January 1914

General characteristics
- Type: Tanker
- Tonnage: 5,853 GRT; 3,795 NRT; 9,800 DWT
- Length: 419 ft 0 in (127.71 m)
- Beam: 55 ft 2 in (16.81 m)
- Draft: 27 ft 0 in (8.23 m) (loaded)
- Depth: 28 ft 8 in (8.74 m)
- Installed power: 424 Nhp, 3,200 ihp
- Propulsion: New York Shipbuilding Co. 3-cylinder triple expansion
- Speed: 11 1/2 knots (13.2 mph; 21.3 km/h)

Oklahoma was a steam tanker built in 1907–1908 by New York Shipbuilding Co. of Camden for the J. M. Guffey Petroleum Company, with intention of transporting oil and petroleum products to ports along the East Coast of the United States and Europe. In January 1914 the tanker ran into a gale and broke in two and sank with a loss of twenty six men.

== Design and construction ==
Early in 1907 J. M. Guffey Petroleum Co. following planned expansion of their pipeline system from Oklahoma to Port Arthur, decided to add a large tanker of approximately 10,000 deadweight to its existing fleet of older vessels, enlarging their oil carrying capabilities. A contract for this vessel was awarded to the New York Shipbuilding Co. and Oklahoma was laid down at the builder's shipyard in Camden (yard number 53) and launched on 29 February 1908, with Miss Mildred Fessenden Taber of New York City, daughter of George H. Taber, general manager of the J. M. Guffey Co., serving as the sponsor. The ship was of the spar-deck type and had two main decks. The ship was equipped with wireless of De Forest type and submarine signal system, and had electrical lights installed along the decks. The tanker had her hold subdivided into sixteen cargo tanks fitted for carrying oil in bulk with a total capacity of approximately 2,520,000 gallons and had a cargo pump room with two duplex pumps located just aft of the main oil tanks. In addition, the tanker had eight extra compartments on the wings, with two of them being designed to carry freight cargo and the other six served as summer oil tanks.

As built, the ship was 419 feet 0 inches (127.71 m) long (between perpendiculars) and 55 feet 2 inches (16.81 m) abeam, and had a depth of 28 feet 8 inches (8.74 m). Oklahoma was originally assessed at 5,853 GRT and 3,795 NRT and had deadweight of approximately 9,800. The vessel had a steel hull with double bottom extending under her forepeak and boiler room, and a single 424 Nhp (3,200 ihp) vertical triple expansion steam engine, with cylinders of 28-inch (71 cm), 46-inch (120 cm) and 76-inch (190 cm) diameter with a 54-inch (140 cm) stroke, that drove a single screw propeller and moved the ship at up to 11 1/2 knots (13.2 mph; 21.3 km/h). The steam for the engine was supplied by three single-ended Scotch boilers fitted for coal. At the time of her construction the vessel was one of the biggest tankers ever built in the United States.

The sea trials were held from April 11 through April 13, during which the tanker was able to achieve top speed of 12 1/4 knots (14.1 mph; 22.7 km/h), about 3/4 of a knot over her contractual speed. After successful completion of the sea trials, Oklahoma was turned over to her owners approximately a week later and officially commissioned on April 25.

== Operational history ==
After delivery to her owners the tanker loaded a full cargo of petroleum consigned to the Anglo-American Oil Company and departed Philadelphia for United Kingdom on 7 May 1908. After reaching and unloading her cargo at Belfast on May 21 and Dublin on May 23, the ship sailed back to Philadelphia arriving there on June 8, thus successfully completing her maiden voyage. On her second trip to England in June 1908 the tanker grounded on the upper end of Tinicum Island while travelling down Schuylkill River with a cargo of 2,400,000 gallons of oil, but was able to refloat herself on the rising tide and proceed to her destination. After two more trips from Philadelphia, the tanker was reassigned to a different route and started carrying oil from Port Arthur to United Kingdom for the remainder of 1908. Starting in 1909 Oklahoma was put on a domestic coastal route carrying oil and petroleum products from Gulf ports of Port Arthur and Beaumont to refineries in Philadelphia and New York. She continued serving this route without interruptions for the remainder of her career.

On 4 January 1911 while attempting to dock in Port Arthur the tanker rammed and cut in half the barge Saratoga belonging to the Texas Company also causing minor damage to the wharf totaling in excess of US$10,000.

In October 1910 Oklahoma became a center of a wireless hoax, when multiple vessels and shore stations picked up a wireless call for help pretending to be coming from her. Several ships searched for presumably stricken tanker including revenue cutter Acushnet but found no trace of the ship. The cutter finally was able to contact Oklahoma next day who was way down south on her way to Port Arthur and reported that everything was normal and they never sent a distress call.

=== Sinking ===
Oklahoma departed for her last voyage from New York in ballast on 3 January 1914 bound for Port Arthur. The tanker was under command of captain Alfred Gunther, had a crew of thirty eight men and also had on board one passenger, captain Loring A. Cates, who was on his way to Port Arthur to assume command of another Gulf Refining vessel. The ship was heading first to the Delaware Breakwater to pick up a barge and resume her trip down south. In the evening of January 3 the tanker ran into a very strong nor'easter of the New Jersey coast, with winds averaging 50 to 60 miles per hour (80 to 97 km/h) and gusts up to 120 miles per hour (190 km/h). The same storm devastated a seashore community of Seabright causing over US$1,000,000 in damages. As the storm raged, Oklahoma maintained her engines running so she would not be driven towards the shore. At around 07:30 on January 4, as captain Gunther was giving the ship's position to the wireless operator (believed to be approximately 39°30′N 74°0′W), a huge wave swept over the side of the vessel breaking her in two with the stern being swung around and laying alongside the bow. Thirty two men were trapped on the stern as it started to fill quickly. Two lifeboats were quickly lowered, one containing approximately 20 men commandeered by captain Cates, and another with eleven men in it. Captain Gunther and seven other crewmen were left on the bow section of the tanker, which continued to float and showed no signs of sinking. Both lifeboats drifted away from the wreck leaving captain Gunther and seven crewmen alone on the ship bow.

At about 15:00 on January 4 Spanish steamer SS Manuel Calvo noticed a floating derelict and closed in to investigate. An attempt was made to lower a lifeboat but as soon as it was lowered, a high wave came in and smashed the lifeboat against the ship's side injuring three men in the process. Due to continuing strong winds and rough seas still present in the area nothing could be accomplished and the vessel left after about an hour of trying. At approximately 05:00 on January 5 German steamer SS Bavaria noticed distress signals and by about 08:00 approached the wreck. By then, the weather had subsided significantly allowing Bavaria to lower a lifeboat and take off all eight men from the fore section of the tanker. British steamer SS Tenadores also arrived at the scene as Bavaria was finishing up the rescue operation and stood by until all survivors were safely on board the German vessel.

One lifeboat with eleven men in it was spotted at around 13:20 on January 4 by a lookout from Booth Line steamer SS Gregory. The lifeboat had a sail hoisted which helped to keep it from being overwhelmed by the waves. However, as soon as survivors noticed Gregory they dropped the sail and their boat almost immediately capsized. Three officers from the Booth liner jumped in the water and managed to bring back six survivors, with one of them dying from exposure on the deck of the steamer.

In response to a radiogram sent by the steamer Manuel Calvo in the late afternoon of January 4, the US Coast Guard cutter Seneca was dispatched from Newport to help the sinking vessel. The cutter had to fight through the same gale as Oklahoma which slowed her down considerably. At around 16:00 on January 5 a lifeboat was spotted with a man sitting upright in it. A surfboat was launched by Seneca and a man and two dead bodies were recovered from the waterlogged lifeboat. An attempt was made to resuscitate a man for two hours on board the cutter but he never regained consciousness.

In the afternoon of January 6 Seneca located the upside-down floating fore section wreck of Oklahoma about 12 nautical miles (22 km) southeast from the Fenwick Island Lightship. After examining it and determining that it could not be safely towed, mines were attached to the body of the wreck, but they failed to explode. As it was getting dark, the cutter decided to stand by waiting for daybreak. In the morning of January 7 it was decided not to use mines and instead the cutter fired sixteen shots from her rapid-fire six-pounder guns causing the wreck to rapidly sink in approximately 18 fathoms (108 ft; 33 m) of water.

Subsequent investigation into the wrecking of Oklahoma established that her loss was unavoidable when her bow and stern were both buoyed up by high seas causing the ship to break in two. In addition, a lack of law controlling and standardizing vessel construction was blamed for the wreck.
