= USRC Seminole =

Ship of the U.S. Revenue Cutter Service

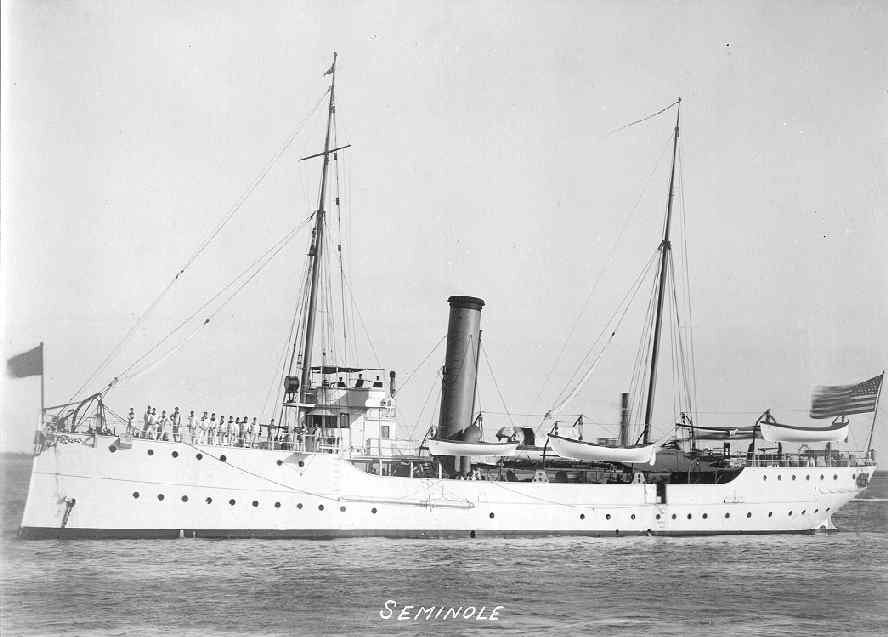
- USRC Seminole

History

United States
- Name: Seminole
- Namesake: Seminole Native American Tribe
- Builder: Columbian Iron Works
- Cost: $141,000
- Launched: 18 March 1899
- Commissioned: 3 September 1900
- Decommissioned: 17 December 1934
- Fate: Transfer to Federal Emergency Relief Administration

General characteristics
- Displacement: 845 tons
- Length: 188 ft (57 m)
- Beam: 29 ft 6 in (8.99 m)
- Draft: 11 ft 8 in (3.56 m)
- Propulsion: Triple-expansion steam, 20.75 in (52.7 cm), 32 in (81 cm), 50 in (130 cm) dia. X 27 in (69 cm) stroke
- Speed: 14.7 knots
- Complement: 8 officers, 59 men
- Armament: (4) 3-pounders

USRC Seminole was a 188 ft (57 m), 845-ton United States Revenue Cutter Service steamer constructed by the Columbian Iron Works in Baltimore, Maryland for $141,000. She was commissioned in 1900 and saw service through 1934, when she was transferred to the Federal Emergency Relief Administration.

== Career ==
Seminole was first based out of Boston and she patrolled the New England coast and the North Atlantic. Her winter cruising area included assisting fishing vessels in the ice of Newfoundland. She transferred to Staten Island, New York on 22 May 1904 and transferred again to Wilmington, North Carolina, arriving on 5 July 1905. Her patrol area included the southeastern coast, as well as winter cruises from Cape Hatteras, North Carolina to Charleston, South Carolina and even down through Key West, Florida. Her duties included derelict destruction, attending local ceremonies, patrolling regattas, and rendering assistance when needed such as the 4 January 1914 rescue of schooner Thomas Winsmore. Winsmore was caught in a gale that forced her to shore where she was taking on water in the hold. Seminole spotted the distressed Winsmore and came to its aid by passing a hawser and towing her to a safe anchorage. When the captain of Seminole learned that the master of Winsmore believed that a mutiny of his crew was likely, armed crew of the Seminole were put aboard Winsmore to stop a possible mutiny. On 9 April 1914 she assisted schooner Wm. Thos. Moore that had been stranded on the bar at Little River Inlet on 29 March.

With the outbreak of World War I in August 1914, USRC Seminole enforced the neutrality laws of the United States until the United States entered the war in April 1917. (Note: After 28 January 1915 the Revenue Cutter Service was merged with the United States Life-Saving Service to form the United States Coast Guard. The prefix for Revenue Cutter Service vessels was changed from USRC to USCGC, thus; USRC Seminole became USCGC Seminole.) She then served under the Navy and patrolled off the Carolinas. In 1923 she was detached to Puerto Rico where she served as an independent unit and returned to her permanent station of Wilmington later that year.

On 5 March 1927, the Spanish cargo ship SS Cabo Hatteras caught fire in the Atlantic Ocean 140 nautical miles (260 km) east-southeast of Sandy Hook, New Jersey, and was abandoned by her crew. The Spanish steamer Cabo Torres rescued them. On 6 March, Seminole sank Cabo Hatteras with gunfire.

In 1929 Seminole transferred for service on the Great Lakes. She was stationed at Sault Ste. Marie, Michigan until she was decommissioned in 1934.

== Notes ==
=== References ===
- Eger, Christopher L. (March 2021). "Hudson Fulton Celebration, Part II". Warship International. LVIII (1): 58–81. ISSN 0043-0374.
- U.S. Revenue Cutter Service (1914). Annual Report of the Revenue Cutter Service, 1914.
- "Coast Guard General Order No. 1" (PDF). Office of the Secretary of the Treasury. U.S. Coast Guard Historian's Office.
- "Seminole, 1900". List of cutters. U.S. Coast Guard Historian's Office.
- Canney, Donald L. (1995). U.S. Coast Guard and Revenue Cutters, 1790–1935. Naval Institute Press, Annapolis, Maryland. ISBN 978-1-55750-101-1.
- U.S. Coast Guard. Record of Movements: Vessels of the United States Coast Guard: 1790 - December 31, 1933. Washington, DC: U.S. Government Printing Office, 1934; 1989 (reprint)
