= Toribio Ortega Ramírez =

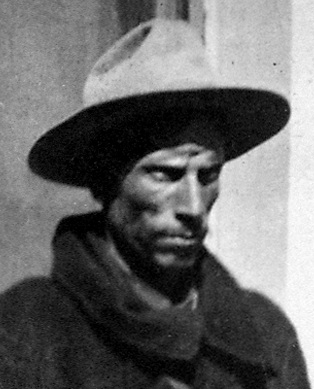
Toribio Ortega in 1913

Toribio Ortega Ramírez (16 April 1870–1914) was a leading general in the Mexican Revolution. He was born on 16 April 1870, in Coyame, Iturbide district, in the State of Chihuahua.

== Family ==
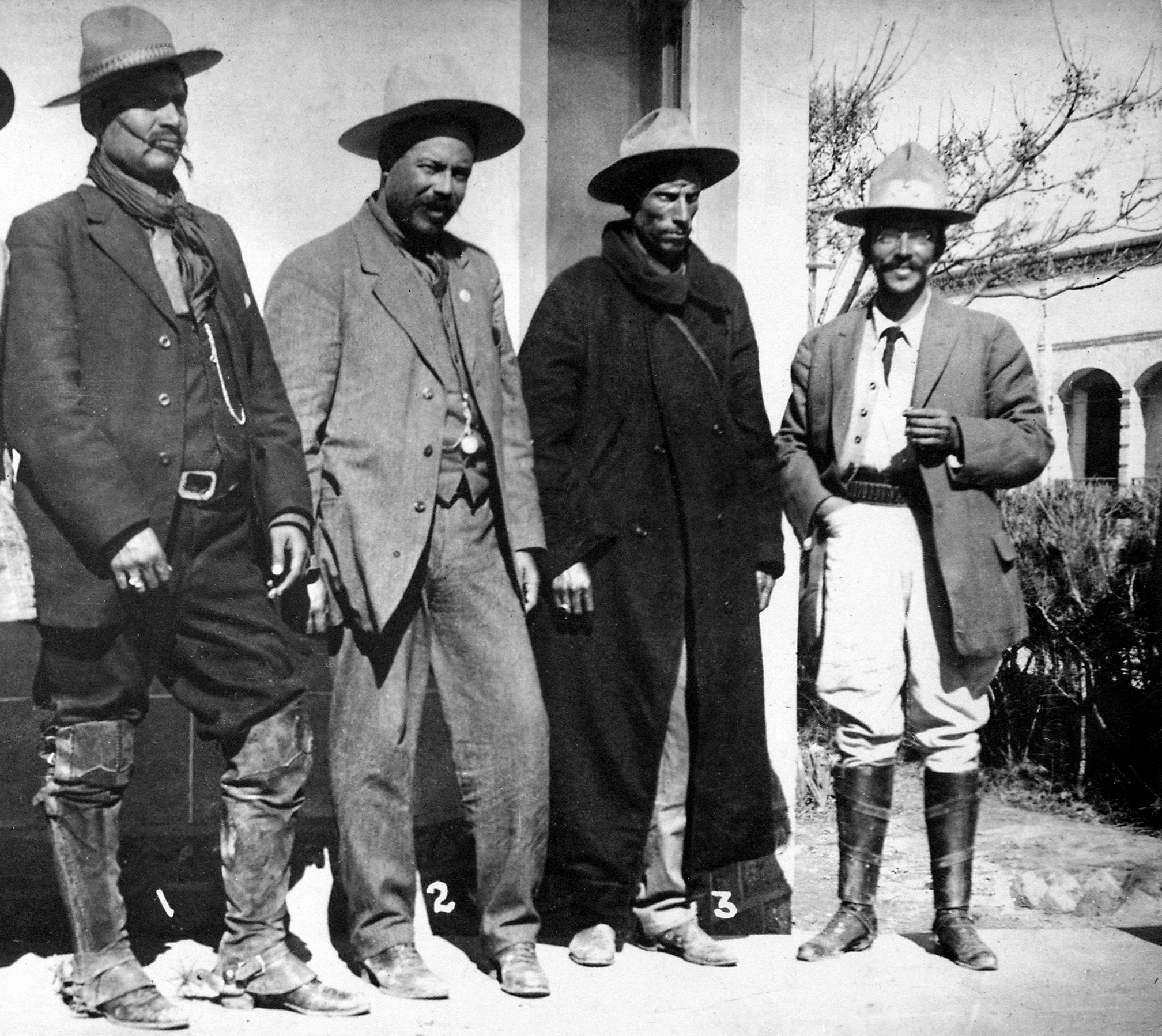
Mexican revolutionaries- (left to right) General Rodolfo Fierro, Pancho Villa, General Toribio Ortega and Colonel Juan Medina

On November 14, 2011, New Mexico Governor Susana Martinez visited Cuchillo Parado, Mexico, for a celebration in honor of Ortega, her great-grandfather. Toribio and his wife Fermina produced three daughters and three sons: Veneranda, Francisca, Juanita, Valerio, Galación (Chon) and Santa Ana. Valerio, the eldest, passed at a year and a half. The fifth born, Santa Ana, died at birth.

== Mexican Revolution ==
Ortega held the rank of general in the Mexican Revolution. Ortega was one of the first to revolt against Porfirio Díaz on November 14, 1910.

== Bibliography ==
- NARANJO, Francisco (1935). Diccionario biográfico Revolucionario (Imprenta Editorial "Cosmos" ed.).

• Ontiveros, Francisco; Toribio Ortega y la Brigada Gonzalez Ortega: Chihuahua, Mexico, 1914. Translation by Victor M. Martinez Ortega, Martinez Publishing; El Paso/Austin 1991.
