= December 1913 =

Month of 1913

<<	December 1913					>>
Su	Mo	Tu	We	Th	Fr	Sa
	1	2	3	4	5	6
7	8	9	10	11	12	13
14	15	16	17	18	19	20
21	22	23	24	25	26	27
28	29	30	31

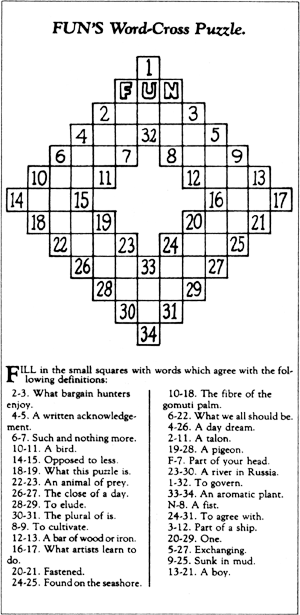
December 21, 1913: The first crossword puzzle is introduced

December 12, 1913: The world's most famous painting, stolen from the Louvre Museum two years earlier, is recovered by police in Italy

The following events occurred in December 1913:

== December 1, 1913 (Monday) ==
- Crete, having obtained self rule from Turkey after the Greco-Turkish War, was annexed by Greece.
- The Ford Motor Company introduced the first moving automobile assembly line, reducing chassis assembly time from 12 1/2 hours in October to 2 hours, 40 minutes. Although Henry Ford was not the first to use an assembly line, and had started the process the month before with the assembly of magnetos, his successful adoption of the line for factories was a milestone in the beginning of the era of mass production.
- The Auckland Exhibition officially opened to the public in Auckland Domain Park, Auckland with an estimated 18,000 attendees the opening day of the world's fair.
- The first drive-in gasoline station opened in Pittsburgh.
- A record blizzard hit Colorado, with four to six feet (one to two meters) of snow falling in the first week of December. Georgetown, in the foothills west of Denver, was the hardest hit with a record 86 inches of snow, just over seven feet (over two meters).
- The Buenos Aires Underground, the subway system for Buenos Aires, opened to the public with Line A carrying 220,000 passengers on the first day. It was the 13th subway system built in the world and the first in Latin America, with stations Alberti, Alberti Norte, Congreso, Lima, Pasco, Pasco Sur, Perú, Piedras, Plaza de Mayo, Plaza Miserere, and Sáenz Peña serving Line A.
- The Victorian Rail Track Corporation opened rail stations at Rupertswood to serve the Bendigo railway line, and the Seaford to serve the Frankston railway line in Victoria, Australia.
- The London Underground extended the Bakerloo line with a new tube station at Paddington.
- Born:
  - Mary Ainsworth, American-Canadian psychologist who developed the concept of attachment theory and the strange situation procedure; as Mary Dinsmore Sadler, in Glendale, Ohio (d. 1999)
  - Mary Martin, American actress and singer, known for stage roles in South Pacific and The Sound of Music; in Weatherford, Texas (d. 1990)
- Died: Juhan Liiv, 49, Estonian poet and short story writer and author of Vari (The Shadow), died of pneumonia contracted after he had been ordered off of a train (b. 1864)

== December 2, 1913 (Tuesday) ==
- U.S. President Woodrow Wilson delivered his first State of the Union address, with a call for the end of the Victoriano Huerta regime in Mexico: "There can be no certain prospect of peace in America until Gen. Huerta has surrendered his usurped authority in Mexico."
- Louis Barthou, 78th Prime Minister of France, resigned after only eight months in office following a defeat on a budget vote.
- During a military practice in Saverne, Germany, Second Lieutenant Günter Freiherr von Forstner – the source of much of the town's outrage against the German military since the Zabern Affair began in November – was mocked by Karl Blank, a journeyman shoemaker. Eyewitnesses reported Forstner lost his temper and struck Blank with his saber, causing severe head injuries that paralyzed him on one side. Forstner was sentenced to 43 days in jail after the first trial, but an appellate trial reversed the sentence after the judge concluded Forstner had acted in self-defense.
- Archbishop José Antonio Lezcano y Ortega was ordained to the newly created Roman Catholic Archdiocese of Managua in Nicaragua, including the Roman Catholic Diocese of Granada. As well, the Vicariate Apostolic of Bluefields was established, eventually elevated to Diocese of Bluefields in 2017.
- Danish author Karen Blixen left her native Rungstedlund, Denmark to settle in Kenya where she would live for almost 28 years on her African farm.
- The Brudenell Social Club opened in Hyde Park, Leeds, England.

== December 3, 1913 (Wednesday) ==
- Twenty-eight men were killed in the Arcadia Hotel fire in Boston.

== December 4, 1913 (Thursday) ==
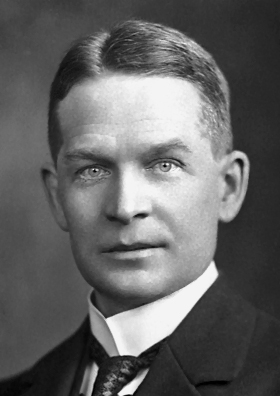
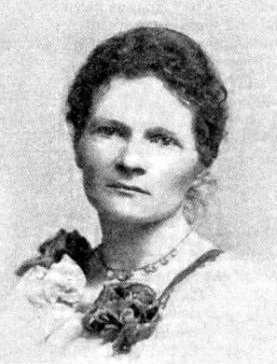
Chemist Frederick Soddy and physician Margaret Todd
- For the first time in the history of the German Empire, the Reichstag passed a vote of no-confidence against the Chancellor, with 293 votes for, 54 against, and four abstentions against the government of Theobald von Bethmann Hollweg. Leaders of each non-governing party declared the actions of the government in relation to the Zabern Affair were "not the view of the Reichstag."
- Vladimir Lenin published his paper "The Poverty of People's Teachers" in the political magazine Za Pravdu.
- Georgetown, Colorado, had the highest recorded snowfall in a 24-hour period in U.S. history, with 63 inches (5 feet, 3 inches or 1.6 metres of snow.
- The word "isotope", referring to a variation of a chemical element containing the same number of protons but a different number of neutrons, was introduced into common usage when the British scientific journal Nature published an article by Frederick Soddy, a pioneer in radiochemistry; Soddy had postulated the existence of isotopes in a February 27 address before Britain's Royal Society, referring to "atoms of the same chemical properties, non-separable by any known process," but without using the term, which was suggested to him by his friend, Edinburgh physician Margaret Todd.
- The opera L'amore medico by composer Ermanno Wolf-Ferrari premiered at the Hoftheater in Dresden.

== December 5, 1913 (Friday) ==
- Isabella Newman of Mordialloc, Victoria, Australia, was arrested on suspicion of several reported disappearances of infants in Melbourne. Investigators connected her to several advertisements that took in infants born out of wedlock for adoption in exchange for fee of services. Upon learning that she was to be taken into Melbourne for further questioning, Newman asked to be excused to change into traveling clothes before locking herself in her bedroom and taking strychnine. Investigation following her suicide uncovered at least three infant bodies, two on the Newman farm property and a third in a different location.

== December 6, 1913 (Saturday) ==
- William Holman, the Premier of the Australian state of New South Wales, retained his membership in the state general assembly by defeating challenger Charles Wade in state elections.
- The World Baseball Tour for 1913–14 began, with the National League champion New York Giants and the American League's fifth-place finishing Chicago White Sox starting their Asian visit in Tokyo. Although an exhibition game, it was the first Major League Baseball game to be played in Japan. The White Sox beat the Giants 9 to 4. The 46-game tour had started in the U.S. on October 18, soon after the end of the World Series, with the Giants and White Sox starting in Cincinnati and ending in Portland, Oregon, on November 19, before the players boarded the ship SS Empress of Japan to sail to Asia.
- The Park Ridge Public Library opened in Park Ridge, Illinois, which was funded by the Carnegie Foundation.
- Born:
  - Nikolai Amosov, Ukrainian heart surgeon, inventor, best-selling author, and exercise enthusiast; in Olkhovo, Russian Empire (d. 2002)
  - Eleanor Holm, American Olympic swimmer, gold medalist at the 1932 Summer Olympics in Los Angeles, who was later barred from the 1936 Olympics for conduct; in New York City (d. 2004)
- Died: Alec Hurley, 42, British music hall performer who was married to Marie Lloyd, died of pneumonia (b. 1871)

== December 7, 1913 (Sunday) ==
- The first direct elections were held in Costa Rica since 1844, with Máximo Fernández Alvarado of the National Republican Party defeating Carlos Durán Cartín of the National Union Party. However, both leaders resigned in May 1914 and Alfredo González Flores was appointed President of Costa Rica.
- Three men were shot during the Copper Country Strike at a boarding house in Painesdale, Michigan. Boarding house owner, Thomas Dally and English brothers Arthur and Harry Jane who were renting rooms from Dally, were killed by random rifle shots fired into the house from nearby woods. The Jane brothers had arrived in Michigan with the intention of crossing strike lines to work. Later, two Finnish immigrant brothers and an Austrian were charged with first degree murder in connection with the shooting, but the third suspect escaped from custody and was never recaptured.
- The first baseball game between Major League Baseball players and a Japanese team took place in Tokyo as a combined Giants and White Sox team beat Keio University 16 to 3.
- A film adaptation of The Sea-Wolf by Jack London went into wide release, starring and directed by Hobart Bosworth, through the Balboa Amusement Producing Company. The film is now considered lost.
- Born: Donald C. MacDonald, Canadian politician, President of Canada's New Democratic Party from 1953 to 1970; in Cranbrook, British Columbia (d. 2008)
- Died:
  - Aaron Montgomery Ward, 70, American entrepreneur, pioneered mail order catalog sales, founder of the Montgomery Ward department store chain (b. 1843)
  - Luigi Oreglia di Santo Stefano, Italian priest, 85, Dean of the College of Cardinals from 1896 to 1913 (b. 1828)

== December 8, 1913 (Monday) ==
- William J. McNamara defeated incumbent William Short to become the 12th Mayor of Edmonton during the municipal election, the first time a sitting mayor in the city was defeated.
- Construction began on the Palace of Fine Arts in the Marina District of San Francisco for the Panama-Pacific Exposition.
- The School of Compounding Medicine at Royal Medical College was established in Bangkok. It became part of the Chulalongkorn University when the educational institution was established in 1916.
- Born: Delmore Schwartz, American poet, notable collections including In Dreams Begin; in New York City (d. 1966)

== December 9, 1913 (Tuesday) ==
- Pancho Villa's forces left Chihuahua City in pursuit of federal troops fleeing to Ojinaga, Mexico, located on the Mexican-U.S. border.
- John K. Tener, former pro baseball player and former 25th Governor of Pennsylvania, was elected president of the National League.
- Born: Gerard Sekoto, South African artist, promoter of urban black art; in Botshabelo, Mpumalanga] (d. 1993)

== December 10, 1913 (Wednesday) ==
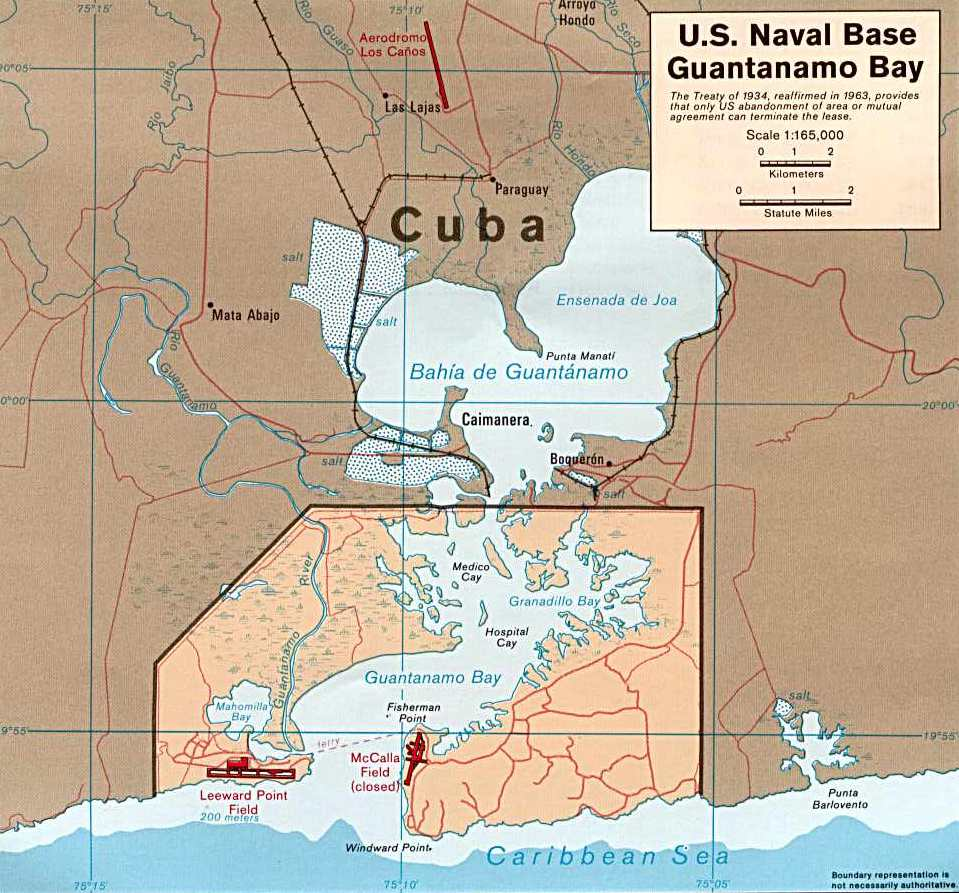
Map of Guantanamo Bay Naval Base

- The Nobel Prize Committee selected Dutch physicist Heike Kamerlingh Onnes as recipient for the Nobel Prize in Physics; Swiss Chemist Alfred Werner for the Nobel Prize in Chemistry; French physiologist Charles Richet for the Nobel Prize in Medicine and Belgian lawyer Henri La Fontaine, head of the International Peace Bureau, for the Nobel Peace Prize.
- Copper Country Strike – Offices of the striking Western Federation of Miners throughout Houghton County, Michigan were raided by members of Citizens Alliance, an organization backed by mining companies affected by the ongoing strike, with assistance from sheriff's deputies.
- The Guantanamo Bay Naval Base, located on 45 square miles (120 km^{2}) of American-controlled land leased in southeastern Cuba by the United States Navy, was officially opened.
- French aviator Léon Letort died from injuries following a crash landing at Barbezieux-Saint-Hilaire, France, while attempting to make the longest flight of the year in a competition by Aéro-Club de France.
- The musical High Jinks composed by Rudolf Friml premiered at the Casino Theatre in New York City where it ran for 213 performances.
- Born:
  - Morton Gould, American composer, recipient of the Pulitzer Prize for Music for Stringmusic; in Richmond Hill, Queens, New York (d. 1996)
  - Harry Locke, British actor, notable for his role in BBC's adaptation of War and Peace; in London(d. 1987)

== December 11, 1913 (Thursday) ==
- The Sikorsky Ilya Muromets four-engine airplane, a heavy bomber for the Imperial Russian Air Service, flew for the first time. The plane was designed by Russian aviation engineer Igor Sikorsky and named after Ilya Muromets, a hero from Russian mythology.
- The Fort Garry Hotel opened in downtown Winnipeg as one of Canada's grand railway hotels. It was added to the National Historic Sites of Canada in 1981.
- Born: Jean Marais, French actor and film director, most known for the title role in Beauty and the Beast; as Jean-Alfred Villain-Marais, in Cherbourg, Manche département (d. 1998)
- Died:
  - Carl von In der Maur, 59, Austrian-born Liechtensteiner state leader, Governor of Liechtenstein for Prince Johann II since 1897, previously Governor 1884 to 1892 (b. 1852). In der Maur died from complications of a stroke and was succeeded by Leopold Freiherr von Imhof.
  - Ioan Kalinderu, 73, Romanian judge and public servant, member of the High Court of Cassation and Justice in Romania and adviser to Carol I of Romania (b. 1840)

== December 12, 1913 (Friday) ==
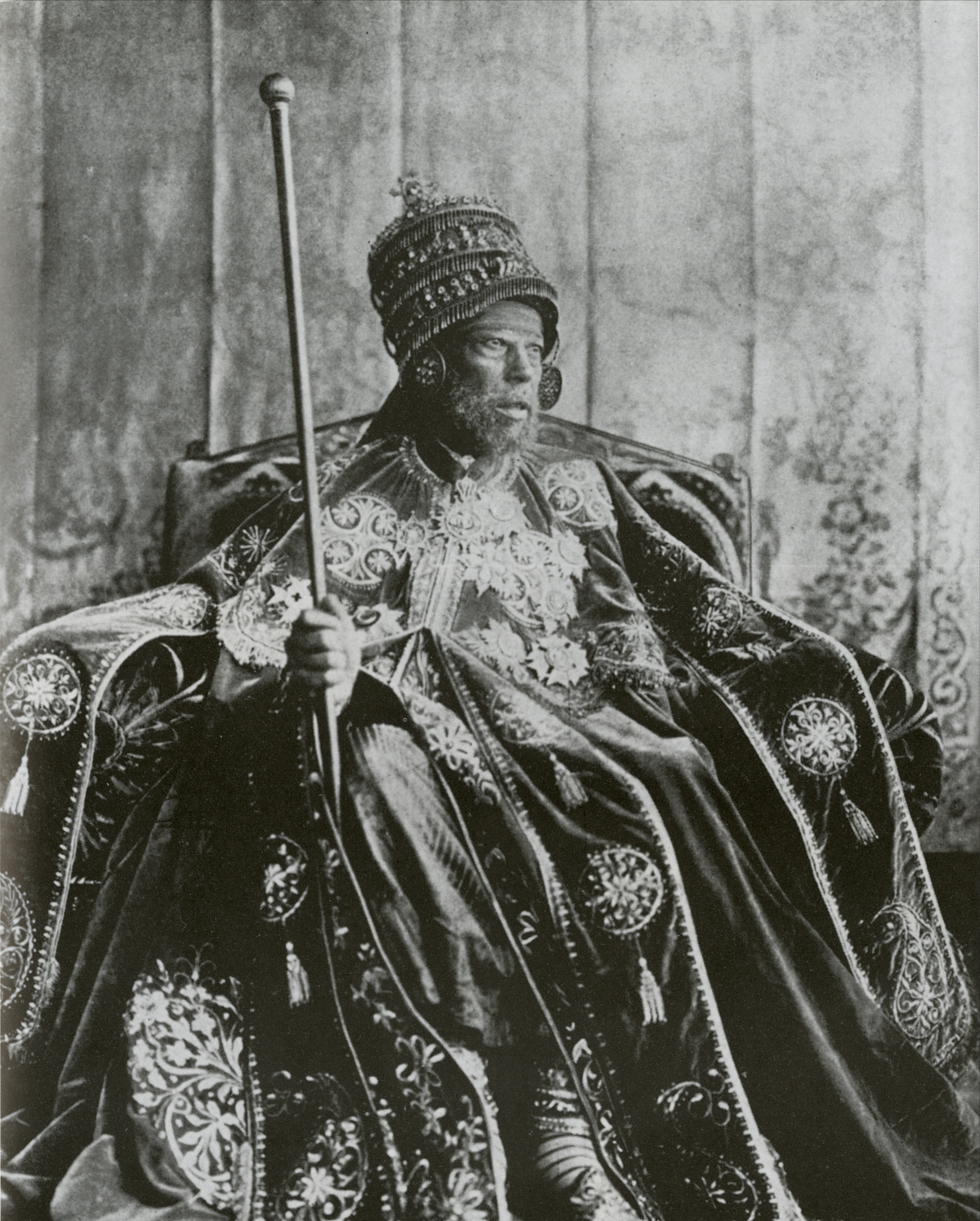
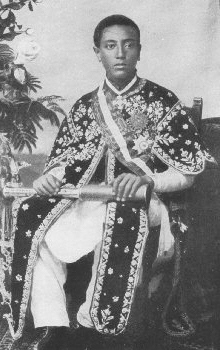
Emperor Menelik II and Lij Iyasu
- Menelik II, the Emperor of Ethiopia since 1889, died at the age of 69. He was succeeded by his 18-year-old grandson, Kiffle Yaqob, whom he had designated in 1909 as his successor after he suffered a stroke. The grandson would reign as Lij Iyasu but would be deposed less than three years later without ever having been crowned.
- The stolen Mona Lisa was recovered in Florence after Vincenzo Peruggia was arrested while trying to sell it.
- Roosevelt–Rondon Scientific Expedition – Following a speaking tour in Brazil and Argentina, former U.S. President Theodore Roosevelt met up with Brazilian military officer and explorer Cândido Rondon to embark on a joint exploration of the "River of Doubt," a 1,000-mile (1,600 km) river (later renamed Roosevelt River) located in a remote area of the Brazilian Amazon basin.
- In the second of three "Brides in the Bath murders", George Joseph Smith's new (second) wife, Alice Burnham, was found dead in her bath in her home in Blackpool, England.
- Born: Stanley Bate, British symphony and opera composer; in Milehouse, Devonshire (d. 1959)

== December 13, 1913 (Saturday) ==
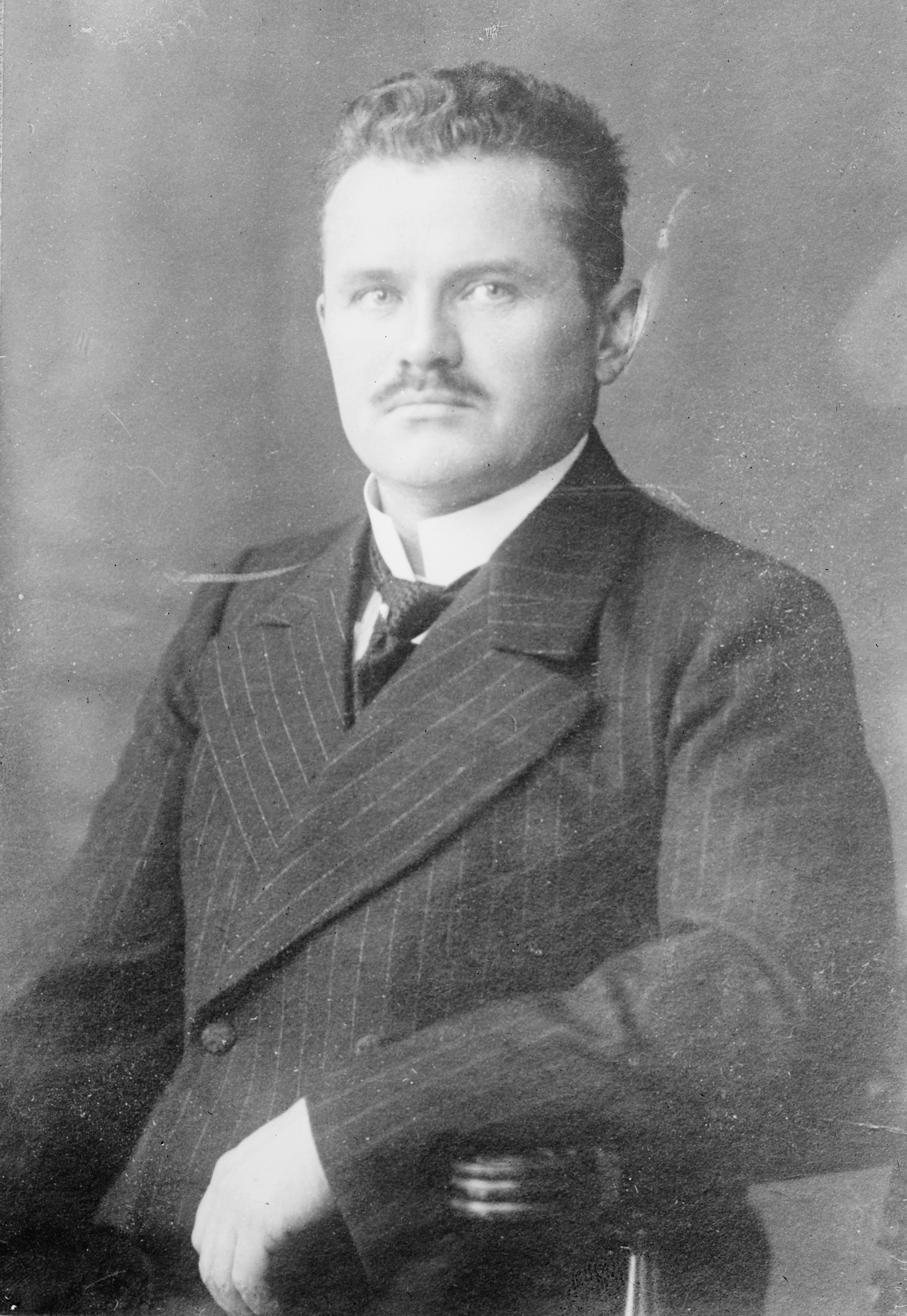
German balloonist Hugo Kaulen, who spent 3½ days in the air

- German balloonist Hugo Kaulen returned to the ground after staying aloft for almost four days (87 hours), a record at that time for the longest time spent floating in the air. His time would not be exceeded until 1935.
- The Edmonton Stock Pavilion opened at Northlands Park, Edmonton for agricultural fairs but evolved to become the city's first indoor arena known as the Edmonton Gardens. It was the first home arena for the Edmonton Oilers when the hockey club was still part of the World Hockey Association. It was renovated three times before it was finally demolished in 1982.
- Born:
  - Archie Moore, American boxer, light heavyweight boxing world champion from 1952 to 1962; as Archibald Lee Wright, in Benoit, Mississippi (d. 1998)
  - John Pope-Hennessy, British art historian, Director of the British Museum from 1974 to 1976, and leading scholar of Italian Renaissance art; in London, England (d. 1994)
  - Arnold Brown, English-born Canadian religious leader, General of The Salvation Army from 1977 to 1981; in London (d. 2002)

== December 14, 1913 (Sunday) ==
- The New York Giants beat the Chicago White Sox 7 to 4 in the first Major League Baseball game to be played in Hong Kong. A December 11 game in Shanghai, that would have been the first on mainland China, had been canceled because of rain. The Hong Kong game was delayed because British health authorities had to determine first that none of the players had smallpox.
- The Imperial Japanese Navy launched the battleship Haruna at the Kawasaki Shipyards in Kobe, Japan.

== December 15, 1913 (Monday) ==
- An election was held in Malta for all eight electoral seats.
- Nicaragua became a signatory to the 1910 Buenos Aires Convention copyright treaty, the third country in Latin America to do so.
- The Royal Navy launched the battlecruiser HMS Tiger – the 11th Royal Navy ship to bear that name – at the John Brown & Company shipyard in Clydebank, Scotland.
- The new Elgin and Winter Garden Theatres opened in Toronto, with American composer Irving Berlin performing at the opening of the new facility.
- Born: Muriel Rukeyser, American poet, author of The Book of the Dead; in New York City (d. 1980)

== December 16, 1913 (Tuesday) ==
- An explosion at Vulcan Mine in New Castle, Colorado, killed 38 miners.
- Parliamentary elections were held in the Kingdom of Croatia-Slavonia. The Croat-Serb Coalition won with 39.09% of the vote.
- Japanese Government Railways extended the Echigo Line in the Niigata Prefecture, Japan, with station Raihai serving the line.
- The Hartola Church was consecrated in Hartola, Finland.
- Born: George Ignatieff, Russian-born Canadian diplomat, Canadian Ambassador to the United Nations from 1966 to 1969, recipient of the 1984 Pearson Medal of Peace; in Saint Petersburg, Russian Empire (d. 1989)

== December 17, 1913 (Wednesday) ==
- The first Major League Baseball game to be played in the Philippines took place in Manila, where the Chicago White Sox beat the New York Giants 2 to 1. The teams met again the next day in Manila, with the White Sox winning again with a score of 7 to 4.
- The village of Coalhurst, Alberta was established.
- Born: Mary Kenneth Keller, American computer scientist, leading promoter of computer science instructions at the smaller college level; in Cleveland (d. 1985)
- Died: Stefano Gobatti, 61, Italian opera composer, known for works including I Goti (b. 1852)

== December 18, 1913 (Thursday) ==
- Croke Park in Dublin was purchased by the Gaelic Athletic Association (GAA) to become the permanent site for national championship games in Gaelic football and for hurling, as well as for Gaelic handball and for the GAA version of rounders. Originally accommodating a few thousand people in its stands, Croke Park is now Ireland's largest stadium, with room for 79,500 people.
- The Spanish government approved the creation of the Commonwealth of Catalonia, a regional governing body for the Catalan language speakers in the northeastern section of Spain. In addition to providing some autonomy for the Catalonians, the Mancomunitat provided common policy for the provinces of Barcelona, Gerona (now Girona), Lerida (now Lleida) and Tarragona. The Mancomunitat, with a President and two councilors from each province, would begin its operation on April 6, 1914, but would be dissolved in 1925.
- The 1913–1914 World Baseball Tour concluded its Philippine stage as both baseball teams took time off to spend the holidays in the Far East before sailing to Australia for a New Year's Day game in Brisbane.
- Born:
  - Willy Brandt, German state leader, Chancellor of West Germany from 1969 to 1974, recipient of the 1971 Nobel Peace Prize; as Herbert Ernst Karl Frahm, in Lübeck, German Empire (d. 1992)
  - Lynn Bari, American actress, known for film roles such as The Bridge of San Luis Rey; as Marjorie Schuyler Fisher, in Roanoke, Virginia (d. 1989)
  - Alfred Bester, American science fiction writer, Hugo Award winner for The Demolished Man; in New York City (d. 1987)
  - Ray Meyer, American basketball coach for DePaul University from 1942 to 1984; as Raymond Joseph Meyer, in Chicago (d. 2006)
  - Saburō Takata, Japanese composer, known for the classical piece Takuboku Tankashu; in Nagoya, Empire of Japan (d. 2000)

== December 19, 1913 (Friday) ==
- Boxers Jack Johnson and Battling Jim Johnson fought a 10-round match for the world heavyweight title in Paris. The novelty of two black professionals competing for the world title drew crowds, but a sportswriter from The Indianapolis Star observed spectators becoming unruly, and demanding their money back, when it became apparent that neither boxer was putting up a fight. At one point, Jack Johnson was only using his right arm to box. Organizers claimed Johnson's left arm had been broken during the third round, but there was no evidence of any injury. The fight was ruled a draw, and Jack Johnson retained his title.
- Peruvian composer Daniel Alomía Robles premiered a zarzuela, or musical play, titled El cóndor pasa at the Teatro Mazzi in Lima.

== December 20, 1913 (Saturday) ==
- A major strike in Wellington, New Zealand, ended after the United Federation of Labour (UFL) conceded defeat. Their labor ally, the Federated Seamen's Union, had broken ranks by reaching a deal with shipowners to return to work. The bitter, two-month labor struggle involved up to 16,000 unionists across New Zealand, and sparked violent clashes between strikers and police.
- A serious fire at Portsmouth Dockyard destroyed the semaphore tower.
- Taiwan Railways Administration opened the Pingtung line in Pingtung City, Taiwan, with stations Liukuaicuo and Akō serving the line.
- The Wandoan railway line opened to link Miles and Wandoan, Queensland, Argentina.
- The association football club Ramón Santamarina was established in Tandil, Argentina.

== December 21, 1913 (Sunday) ==
- An earthquake with a magnitude of 7.2 struck Yunnan, China, killing at least 942 people. Another 112 were injured, and scores of homes were destroyed.
- The first crossword puzzle in history, Arthur Wynne's "word-cross", was published in the New York World.
- The parish Grace Church on-the-Hill was consecrated in the Forest Hill neighborhood of Toronto.
- Born:
  - Arnold Friberg, American painter, known for the painting The Prayer at Valley Forge; in Winnetka, Illinois (d. 2010)
  - Raich Carter, English association football player and coach, inside forward for the England national football team from 1934 to 1947, team captain for Sunderland and Derby County from 1931 to 1948; as Horatio Stratton Carter, in Hendon, Sunderland (d. 1994)

== December 22, 1913 (Monday) ==
- The Kilcoy railway line was extended to link Kilcoy to Woodford, Queensland, Australia. The first half of the line would close in 1964 and the other half closed in 1996.
- British racing driver Lydston Hornsted set a new land speed record in excess of 200 kilometres per hour (120 mph) driving in a Benz 200 horse power racing car ("Blitzenbenz") at the Brooklands racing circuit in southern England.

== December 23, 1913 (Tuesday) ==
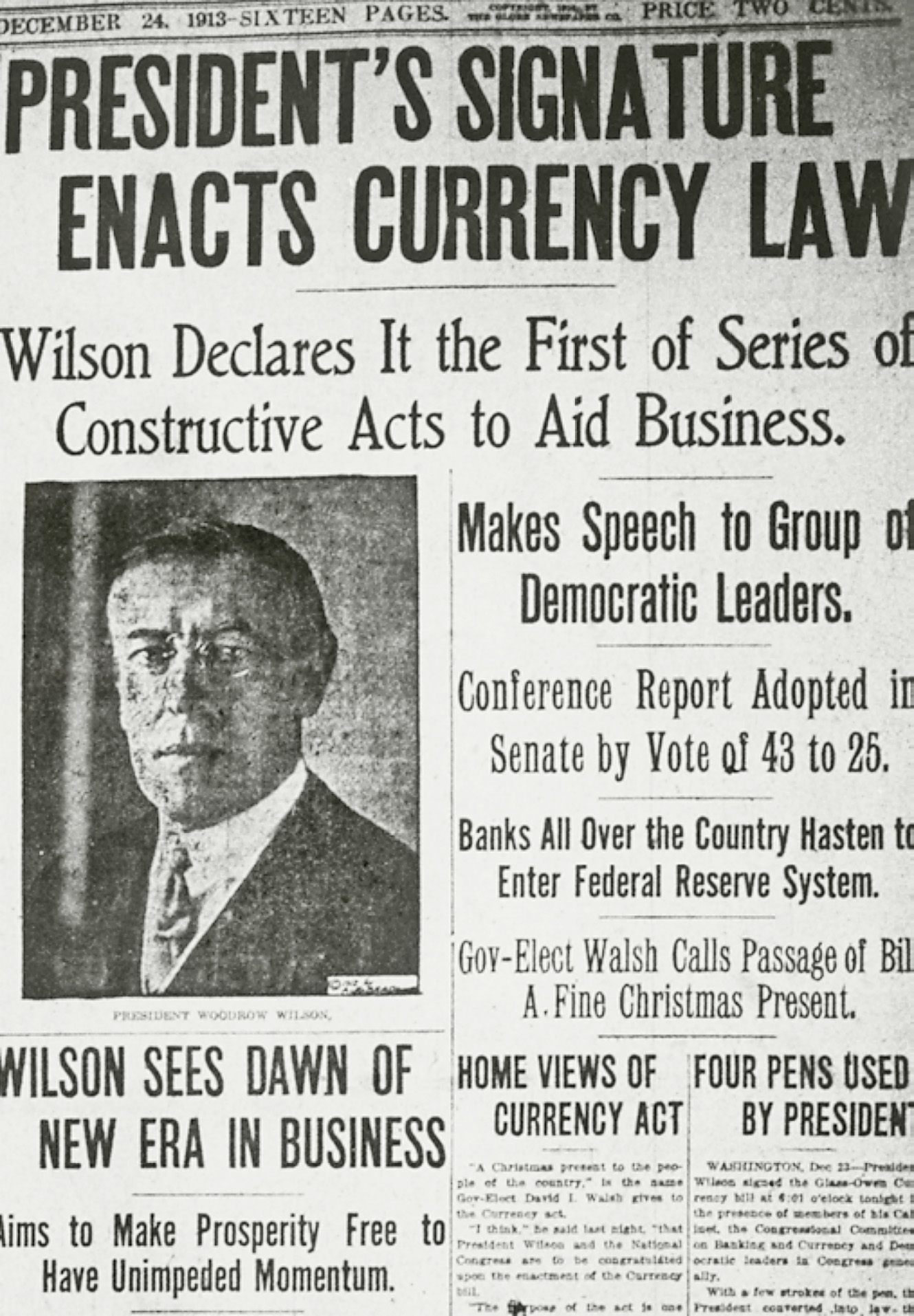
Newspaper article announcing the signing of the Federal Reserve into law

- The Federal Reserve Act was signed into law by U.S. President Woodrow Wilson, creating the Federal Reserve as the central banking system of the United States.
- Died: Bonnor Middleton, 48, South African cricketer, played six Tests from 1896 to 1902 for the South Africa national cricket team, died of an asthma attack (b. 1865)

== December 24, 1913 (Wednesday) ==
- The Old Townsville railway station opened in Townsville City, Queensland, Australia to serve the North Coast railway line. It was replaced by the newer rail station in 2003 while the building itself remains operating as the administrative offices for Queensland Rail.
- Seventy-three people were killed in a stampede at the Italian Hall in Calumet, Michigan (59 of them children) during a Christmas Eve celebration for over 400 striking miners and their families. An unknown person had yelled "Fire!" even though there was none. Speculation included the theory that an anti-union ally of mine management had yelled out the false alarm in order to disrupt the party.
- Born: Ad Reinhardt, American abstract painter, member of the American Abstract Artists in New York City; as Adolph Reinhardt, in Buffalo, New York (d. 1967)

== December 25, 1913 (Thursday) ==
- The polar expedition crew on the Karluk celebrated Christmas, with decorations, presents, a programme of sports on the ice, and a banquet. The polar ship had been drifting west in the ice for nearly three months and was now just 50 miles (80 km) north of Herald Island, a rocky outpost east of Wrangel Island, in the Beaufort Sea.
- The Grytviken Church was consecrated by the Church of Norway for the whaling community of Grytviken, South Georgia Island.
- The remaining structure to the decommissioned Dames Point Light house on St. Johns River, Florida was destroyed by fire.
- Disfellowshipped Adventist lay preacher Felix Manalo begins the new religious movement known as the Iglesia ni Cristo with the baptism of its first members.
- Born:
  - Henri Nannen, German journalist, founder of Gruner + Jahr and the news magazine Stern; in Emden, German Empire (d. 1996)
  - Tony Martin, American singer known for hits such as "Fools Rush In" and "La Vie en rose"; as Alvin Morris, in San Francisco (d. 2012)

== December 26, 1913 (Friday) ==
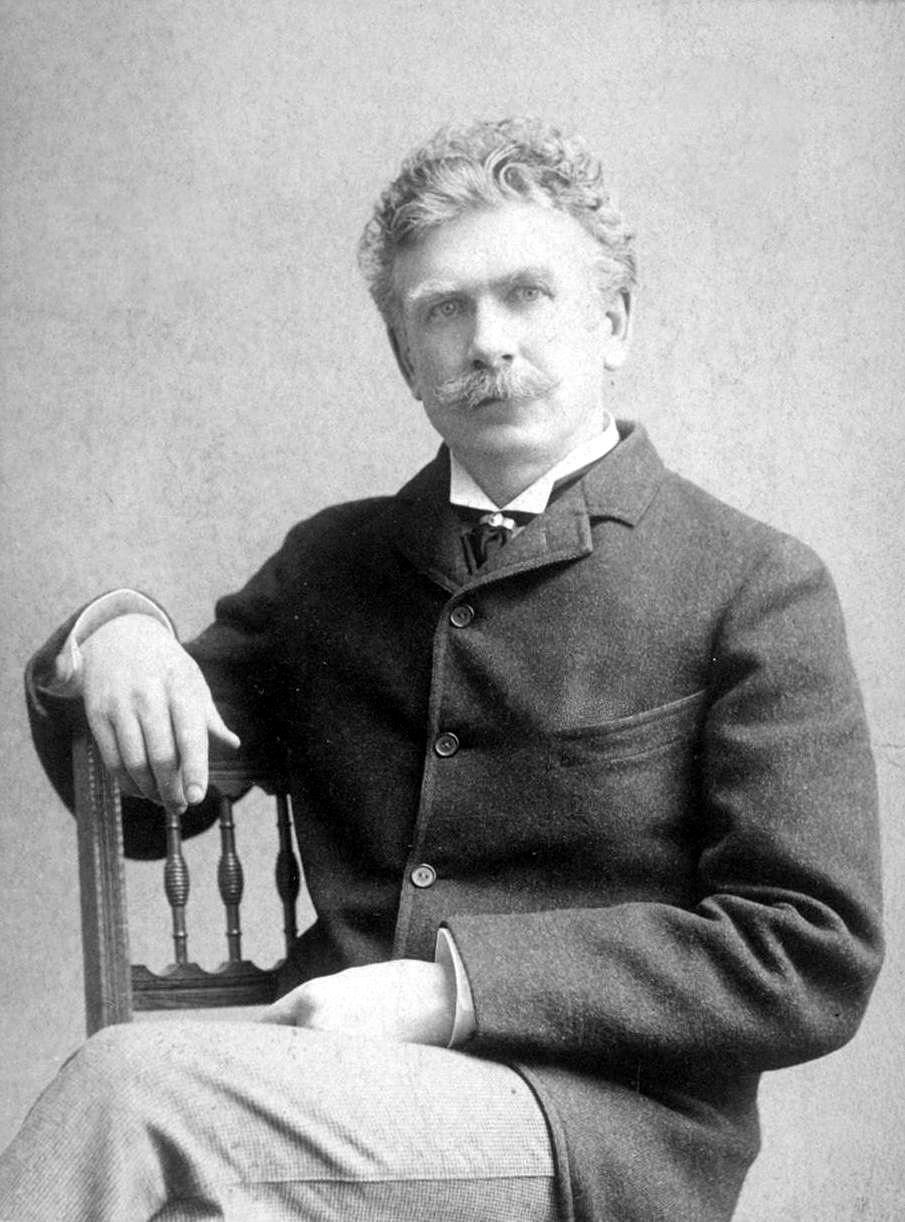
American author Ambrose Bierce

- Ambrose Bierce, a 71-year-old American writer and journalist, author of "An Occurrence at Owl Creek Bridge", disappeared after writing a letter to Blanche Partington from Chihuahua City in Mexico. Dated December 26, 1913, the letter ended with the sentence: "As to me, I leave here tomorrow for an unknown destination." Theories for Bierce's vanishing after the date of the letter are numerous. Stories from locals in Sierra Mojada, Coahuila, documented by the priest James Lienert, stated that Bierce was executed by firing squad in a local town cemetery. However, no firm evidence has yet to turn up that resolves the mystery surrounding the famous author's fate.
- Charles Moyer, president of the Western Federation of Miners that were on strike, was attacked in his hotel room in Hancock, Michigan, by assailants allegedly working for the mining companies. After being beaten with a pistol, Moyer was shot in the back and then dragged to a nearby train station. Moyer reported being met by Jim McNaughton, manager of the Calumet and Hecla Mine Company, at the station and being told "If I ever came back to Houghton or the range he would see me hanged." Moyer was forced onto a train heading to Chicago where he was treated at the city's St. Luke's Hospital for his injuries. McNaughton denied he made any threats to Moyer. The assault remains unsolved.
- The Danish film Atlantis, starring Olaf Fønss and opera singer Ida Orloff and directed by August Blom, was released through Nordisk Film. The film drew criticism for the depiction of a sinking ocean liner as part of its plot, a year after the sinking of the RMS Titanic, but has garnered credit for being one the first great films of the early age of cinema.
- Born:
  - Frank Swift, English association football player, goalkeeper for Manchester City and the England national team; in Blackpool, Lancashire (killed in Munich air disaster, 1958)
  - Vladimir Tretchikoff, Russian painter, known for works including Chinese Girl and Alicia Markova "The Dying Swan"; in Petropavlovsk, Russian Empire (present-day Petropavl, Kazakhstan) (d. 2006)

== December 27, 1913 (Saturday) ==
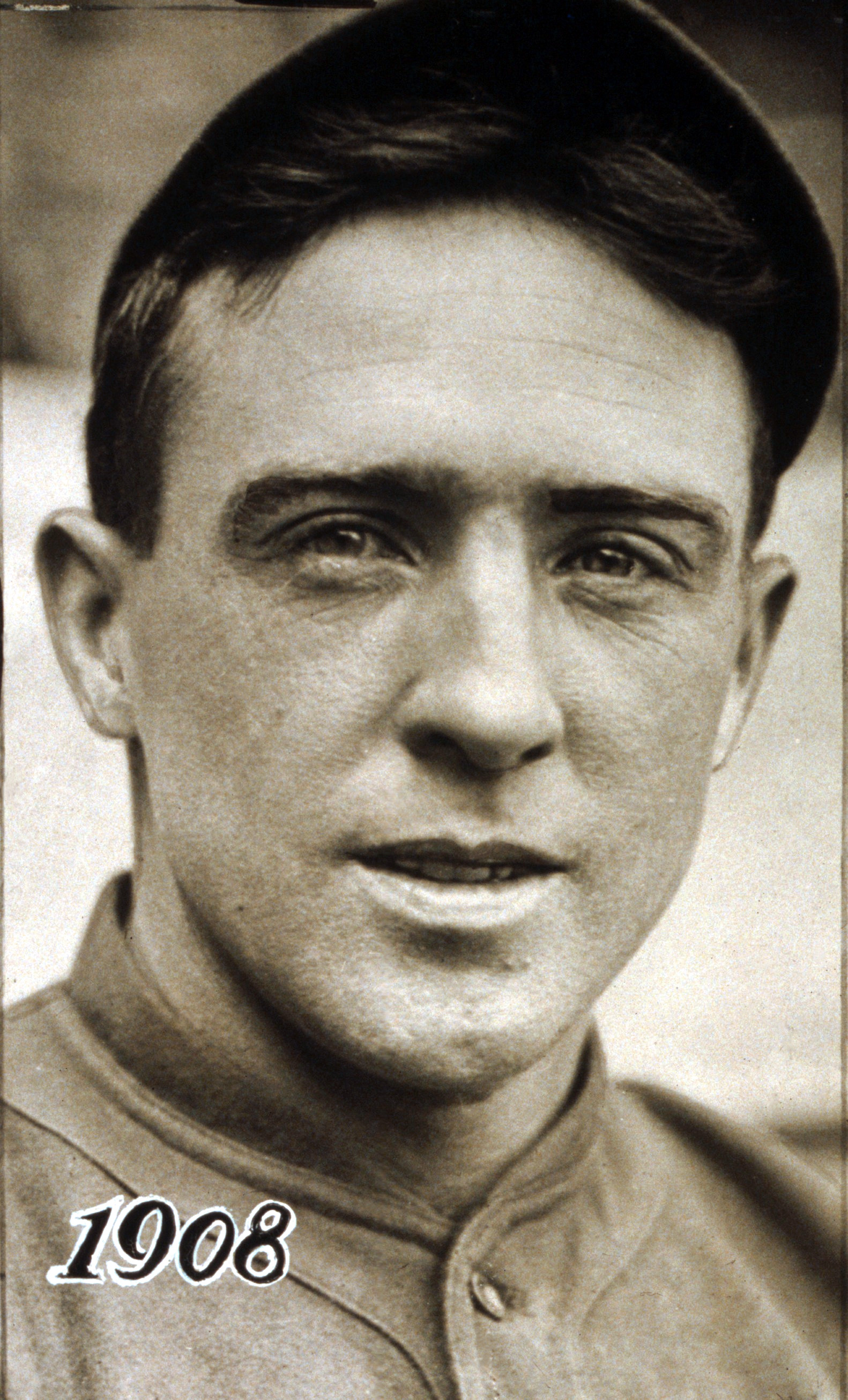
Shortstop Joe Tinker

- Baseball's new Federal League signed its first major star when Brooklyn Dodgers shortstop Joe Tinker (of "Tinker to Evers to Chance" fame) signed a contract with the Chicago Whales.
- Born: Elizabeth Smart, Canadian author, known for By Grand Central Station I Sat Down and Wept; in Ottawa (d. 1986)

== December 28, 1913 (Sunday) ==
- The Mykolaiv Regional Museum of Local History was established in Ukraine.
- The "Venus of Cyrene", a headless marble sculpture, was discovered by Italian troops in Cyrene, Libya after torrential rains washed away the topsoil at the Baths of Trajan in the Sanctuary of Apollo. It would be displayed in Rome for 94 years, but would be returned to Libya in 2008.
- Born: Lou Jacobi, Canadian-American actor, famous for stage and film roles including Broadway's The Diary of Anne Frank; as Louis Jacobovitch, in Toronto (d. 2009)

== December 29, 1913 (Monday) ==
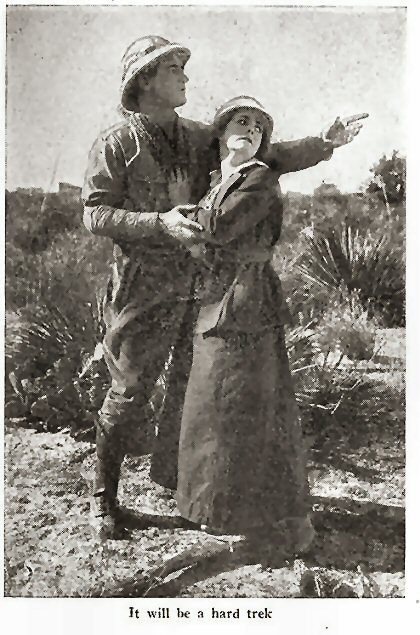
The Adventures of Kathlyn

- The first serial film, The Adventures of Kathlyn starring Kathlyn Williams, premiered in Chicago.
- Charlie Chaplin signed a contract with Mack Sennett to begin making films at Keystone Studios.
- The Girl on the Film, a Broadway production, opened at the 44th Street Theatre and ran for 64 performances.
- The comic strip Jerry on the Job by Walter Hoban began its run through the Newspaper Feature Service owned by newspaper mogul William Randolph Hearst. The strip would run until 1931.
- Born: Pierre Werner, French-born Luxembourgian state leader, Prime Minister of Luxembourg 1979 to 1984; in Saint-André-lez-Lille, Nord département (d. 2002)

== December 30, 1913 (Tuesday) ==
- The Sydney Morning Herald broke the news that thousands of people were starving in the Aomori and Hokkaido prefectures of Japan, in one of the worst famines in the country since 1809.
- Italy returned the Mona Lisa to France.
- English cricketer Sydney Barnes took 17 wickets in a match between England and South Africa (8–56 and 9–103), totaling 49 wickets, the most in a Test series.
- Born:
  - Elyne Mitchell, Australian author, creator of the Silver Brumby series of children's novels; as Elyne Chauvel, in Melbourne (d. 2002)
  - Lucio Agostini, Italian-born Canadian composer, known for his collaborative work with the Canadian Broadcasting Corporation; in Fano, Kingdom of Italy (d. 1996)

== December 31, 1913 (Wednesday) ==
- The second cabinet under Romanian Prime Minister Titu Maiorescu was dissolved.
- Airplane co-inventor Orville Wright made the first public demonstration of the next generation of airplanes, the Wright Model E, an airplane that had come equipped with an autopilot that could not only keep the plane in the air, but could also turn the plane on a preset course. Before a crowd of onlookers at Huffman Prairie outside Dayton, Ohio, Wright showed off the new "automatic stabilizer" and flew "seven circuits around the Huffman Prairie while holding his hands above his head", so that the onlookers could see that he wasn't touching the controls, before taking back over to come in for a landing. For his accomplishment, timed by the Wright for the last day of the year to avoid being bested by his rival, Glenn Curtiss, Wright won the Collier Trophy, awarded by the Aero Club of America, for the year's most significant innovation in aeronautics.
- For the first time in its 6,400 year history, the Holy City of Jerusalem was the site of an airplane landing. The pilot, French Army General Gaëtan Bonnier landed his Blériot XI near the Pool of Siloam, and was welcomed by Jerusalem Mayor Hussein al-Husayni, the executive appointed by the Ottoman Empire.
- The village of Lakeview, Alberta was established.
