= Constitución (Buenos Aires Underground) =

Buenos Aires Underground station

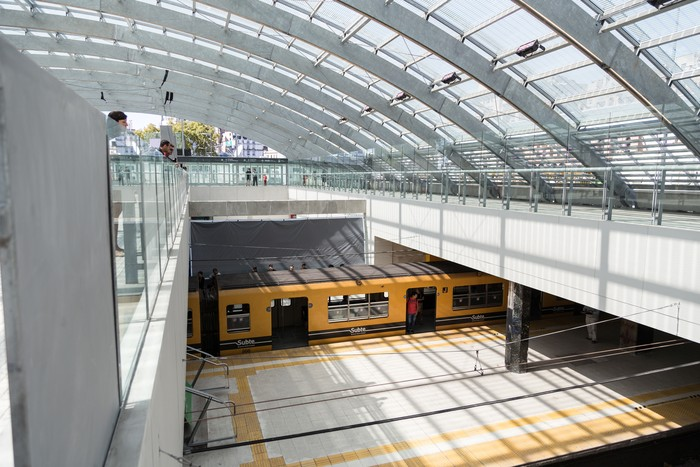

General information
- Location: Lima and Brasil
- Coordinates: 34°37′40″S 58°22′52.7″W
- Platforms: Island and Side platforms
- Connections: General Roca Railway, Roca Line and

History
- Opened: 9 November 1934

Services
Preceding station	Buenos Aires Underground	Following station
San Juan towards Retiro	Line C	Terminus
Location

Constitución is a station on Line C of the Buenos Aires Underground and is the current terminus. Here passengers can transfer to Metrobus Sur. The station is a part of the larger Constitución railway station which serves as the terminal for the General Roca Railway and Roca Line. The station was opened on 9 November 1934 as part of the inaugural section of the line, from Constitución to Diagonal Norte.

== Line E ==
Up until 1966, the station also combined with Line E at a station, also called Constitución, until line E was re-routed. It is hence now a is a ghost station.

=== History ===
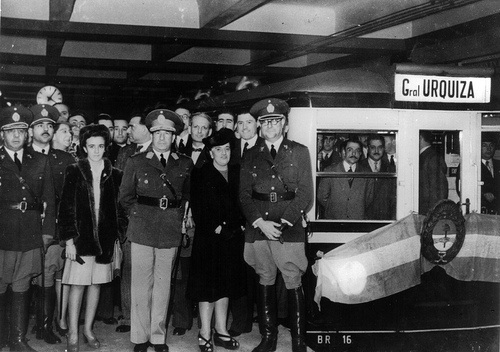
The station at its inauguration in 1944 with Siemens-Schuckert Orenstein & Koppel rolling stock visible.

The station was the original terminus of Line E when it still had its original trajectory to Constitución railway station where it combined with the General Roca Railway. However, the line was re-routed further towards the centre of the city in 1966 in order to improve the line's traffic and the station was closed along with San José vieja station on 24 April 1966.

The first tunnels heading towards the station were actually constructed in 1932 (instead of 1938 like the rest of the line) since the Hispanic-Argentine Company for Public Works and Finances (CHADOPyF) built 100m of tunnels originally intended for Line C, which was soon abandoned in favour of the line's current trajectory. When construction of Line E began in 1938, the tunnel was re-purposed as the first part of the line.

Constitución is today a ghost station, used partially as a maintenance area for the rolling stock of both Line E and Line C under the name Constitución Workshops, though the manoeuvring areas had already been used as a workshop as early as 1934 for Line C before work on Line E commenced.

=== Possible use on Line F ===
As early as 1957, the use of the station as part of a new north-south line was being considered. In 2006, it was under evaluation whether the two Line E ghost stations could be used as the southern point of Line F, considering they overlapped the line's trajectory. However, it was later decided that Line F would use a completely new tunnel with new stations given the frequency the line is expected to have.

== Gallery ==
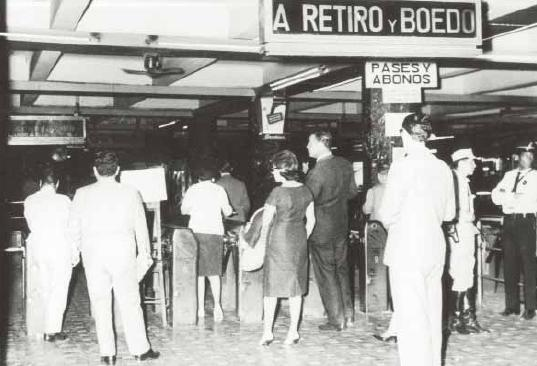
Former Line E connection

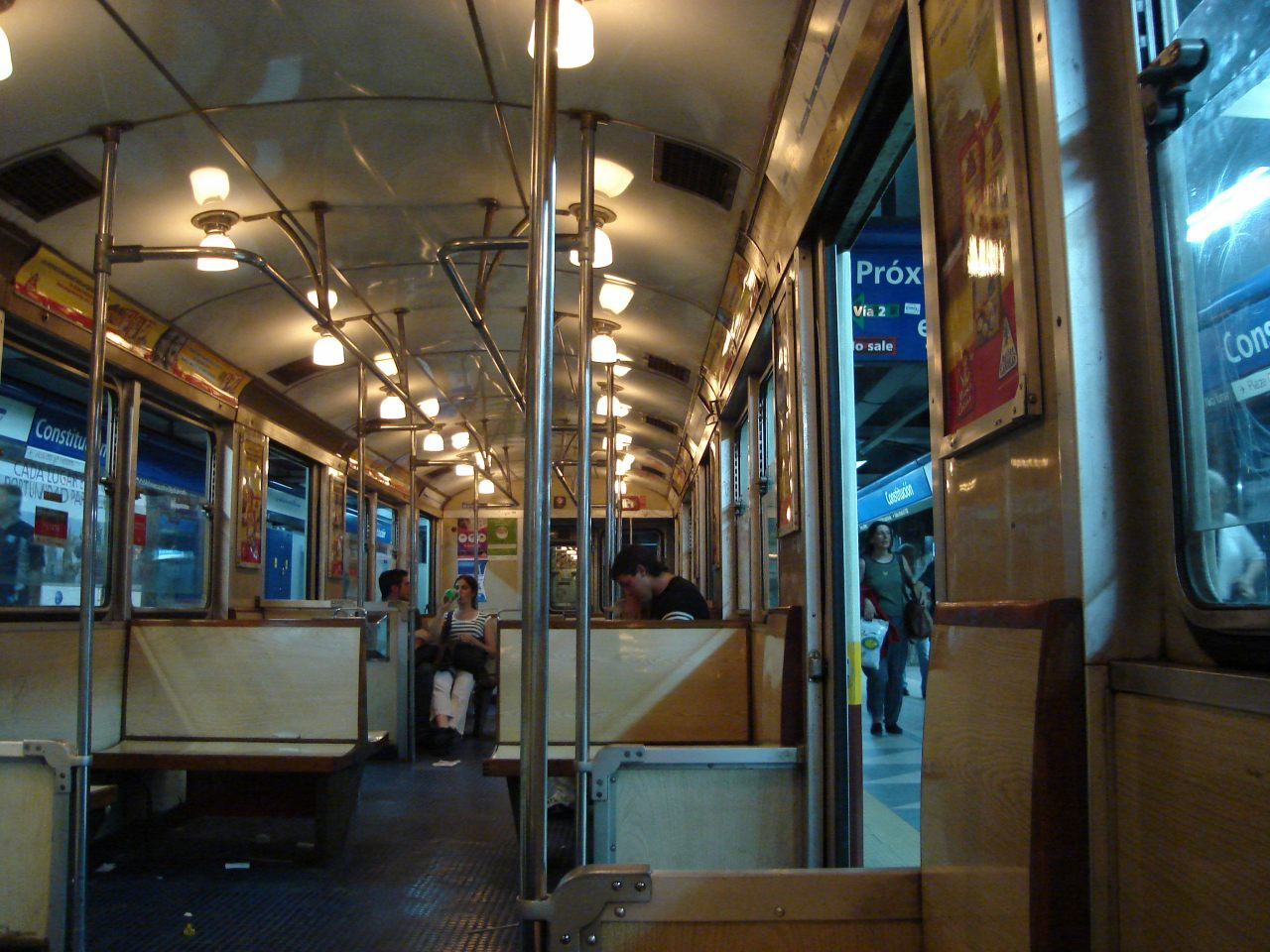
Interior of 1930s Seimens rolling stock

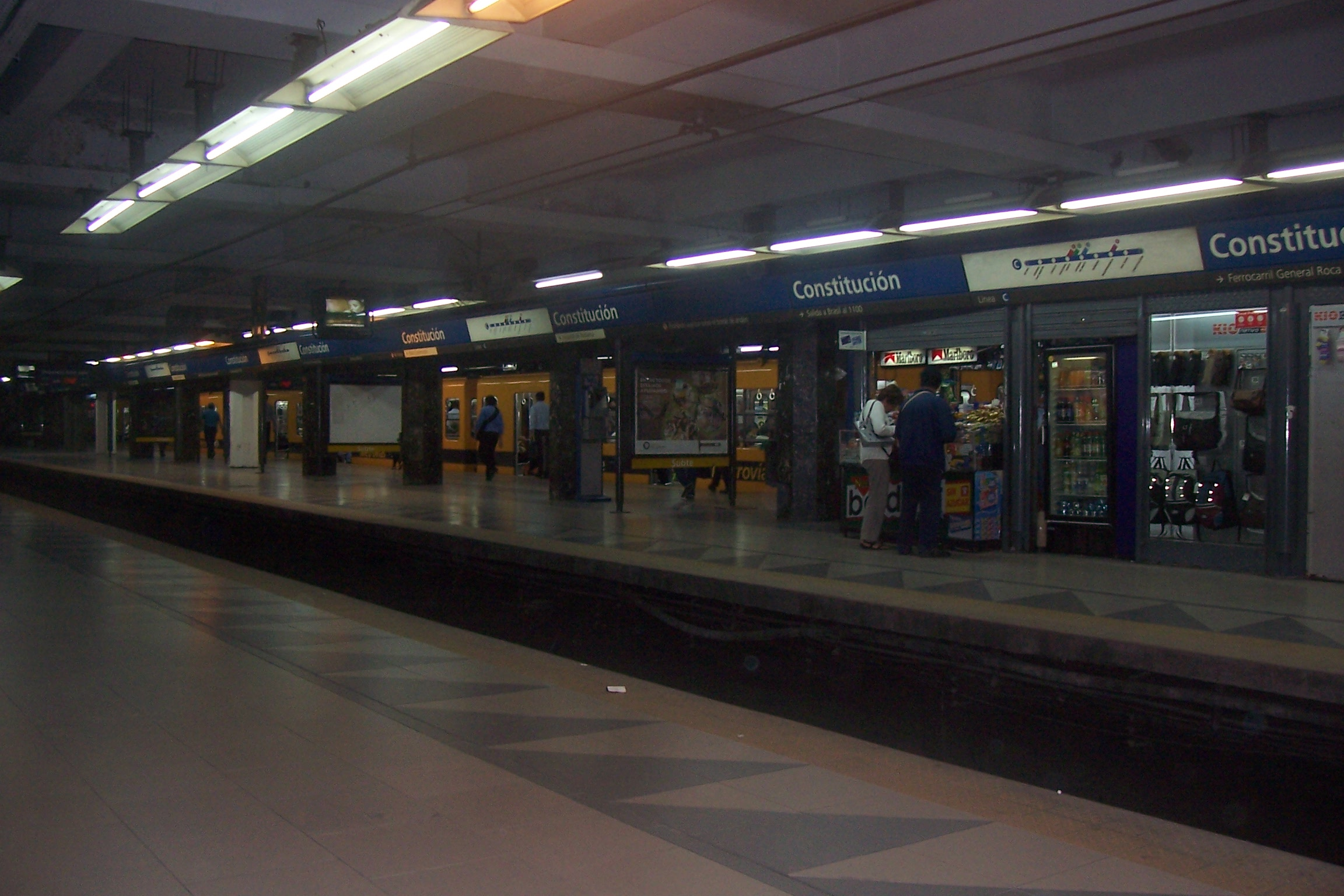
Platforms

== See also ==
- San José vieja - Ghost station on Line E
- Pasco Sur - Ghost station on Line A
- Alberti Norte - Ghost station on Line A
