= San José vieja (Buenos Aires Underground) =

Former Buenos Aires Underground station

San José vieja (closed)

General information
- Location: San Juan and San José
- Platforms: Side platforms

History
- Opened: 1944
- Closed: 24 April 1966

San José vieja is a ghost station in the Buenos Aires Underground, which was part of Line E until its closure in 1966. It is one of two ghost stations on the line, the other being Constitución.

== History ==
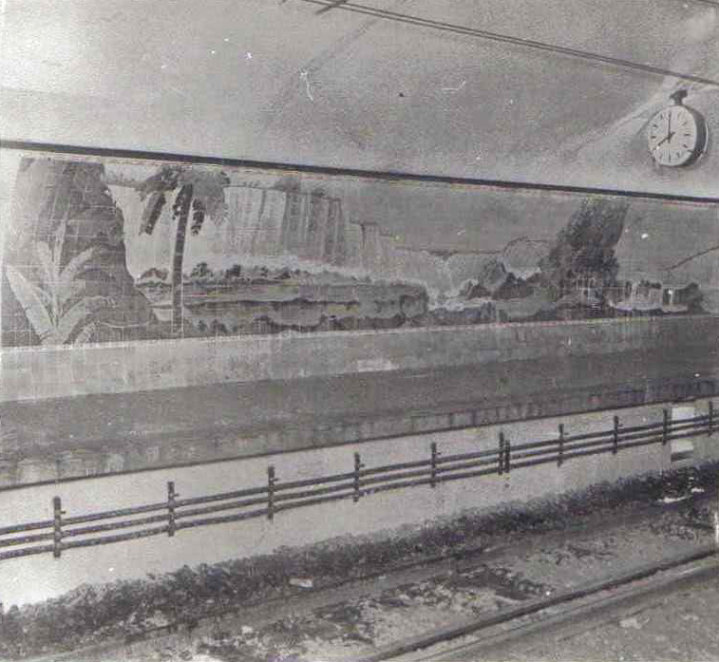
One of the station's murals (c.1960s)

The station was part of Line E's original trajectory to Constitución railway station where it combined with Line C and terminated. However, the line was re-routed further towards the centre of the city in 1966 in order to improve the line's traffic and the station was closed along with Constitución station.

In the year the line was re-routed, the station was still used briefly as part of a low-frequency branch of the line. However, when it was finally closed in that same year, it was used as a storage area for the line's rolling stock up until 1999 when it was converted into a maintenance area. Its current naming is San José Workshop, while at the same time the station's murals are preserved and protected.

The station was used as a set for the 1996 Argentine film Moebius and served as the fictional Dock Sud and Parque stations. In December 2014, murals representing scenes and dialogues from the film were set up at the current San José station.

== Possible use on Line F ==
As early as 1957, the use of the station as part of a new north-south line was being considered. In 2006, it was under evaluation whether the two Line E ghost stations could be used as the southern point of Line F, considering they overlapped the line's trajectory. However, it was later decided that Line F would use a completely new tunnel with new stations given the frequency the line is expected to have.

== See also ==
- Constitución - Ghost station on the same line
- Pasco Sur - Ghost station on Line A
- Alberti Norte - Ghost station on Line A
