= Pasco Sur (Buenos Aires Underground) =

Former Buenos Aires Underground station

Pasco Sur (Closed)
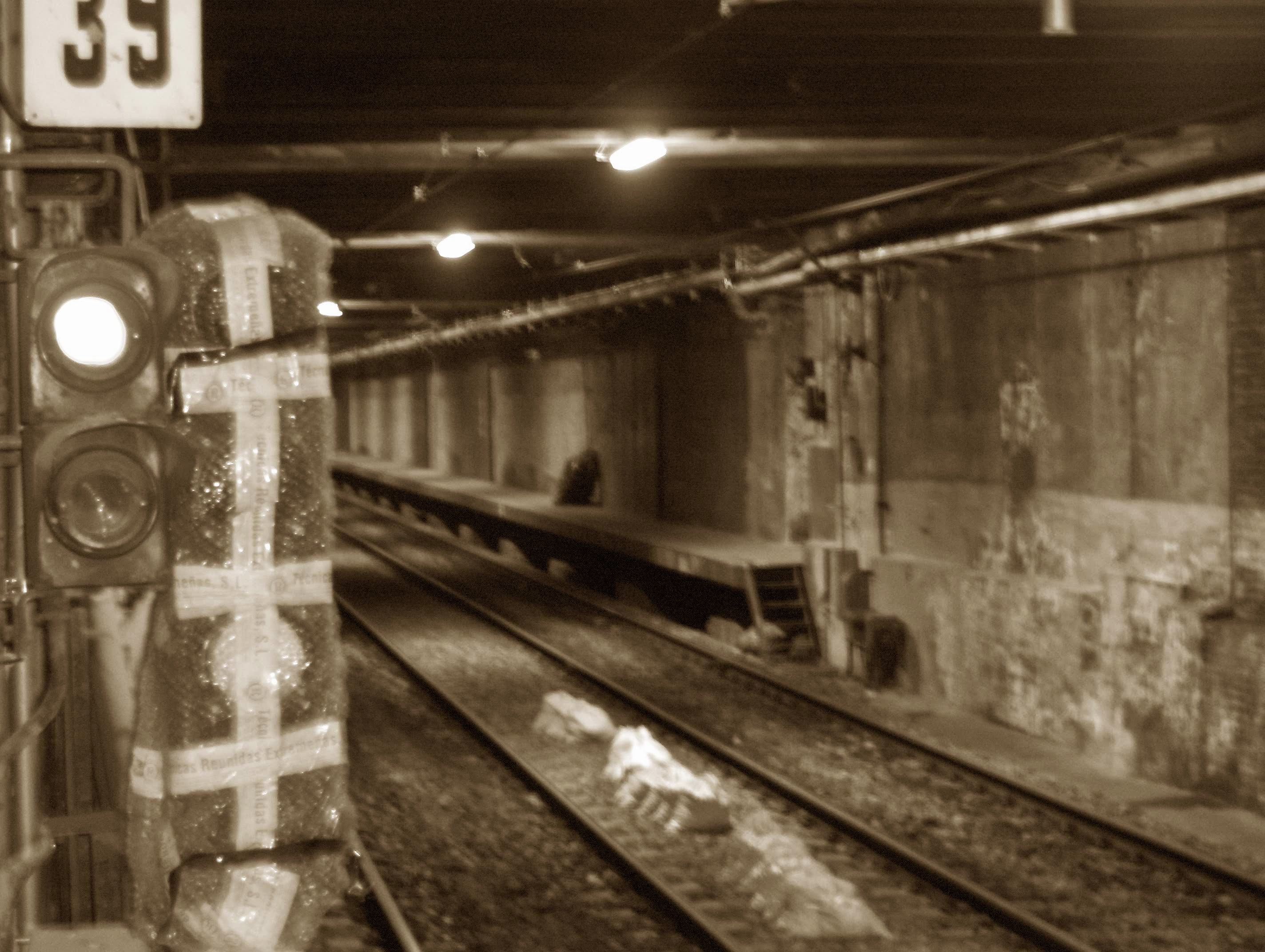

General information
- Location: Avenida Rivadavia and Pasco
- Coordinates: 34°36′35.1″S 58°23′49.5″W
- Platforms: Single side platform

History
- Opened: 1913
- Closed: 1953
Location

Pasco Sur is a ghost station in the Buenos Aires Underground, which was part of Line A until its closure in 1953. It is one of two ghost stations on the line, the other being Alberti Norte.

== History ==
The station was originally opened in 1913, as one of the original Line A stations opened that year. The station was unusual for the network in the sense that it only had one platform, serving only trains heading towards Primera Junta (the terminus at the time), with the opposite platform located some metres away at Pasco station.

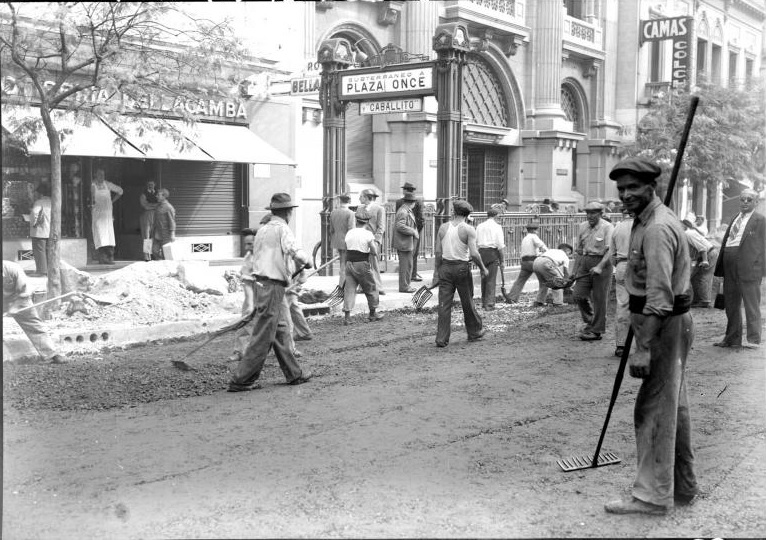
Road workers outside the entrance to the station (1938)

Given its proximity to Alberti's southern platform (located just 124 metres away), both Pasco Sur and Alberti Norte stations were closed in 1953 in order to improve the line's frequency, since the closeness of stations in that part of the line meant that trains could never accelerate to full speed before having to stop again.

Some theories claim that this station was closed as a result of the destruction and burning down of the building located above the station, which was the headquarters of the Argentine Socialist Party at the time. However, it is unclear to what extent this may have influenced the closure of the station, if at all. Upon the closure of the station, passengers could still see the unaltered station for many years from the line's trains.

Unlike Alberti Norte which was converted into an electrical substation, Pasco Sur has mostly maintained its original condition, with its turnstiles, signage and ticket counters still intact, and these can be occasionally observed by passengers when the station's lights are occasionally turned on.

== Urban myths ==
There are a number of urban myths surrounding the station. The most popular of these claims that a woman depressed by being left by her boyfriend threw herself onto the tracks at the station in an act of suicide, while another version of the same myth claims that she was forced into marriage to someone she did not love by her parents and committed suicide in the same manner. This is one of the oldest urban myths related to the Underground and is furthered by the presence of a mysterious white cross in the tunnel near the station.

== See also ==
- San José vieja - Ghost station on Line E
- Constitución - Ghost station on Line E
- Alberti Norte - Ghost station on Line A
