= Alberti Norte (Buenos Aires Underground) =

Former Buenos Aires Underground station

Alberti Norte (Closed)
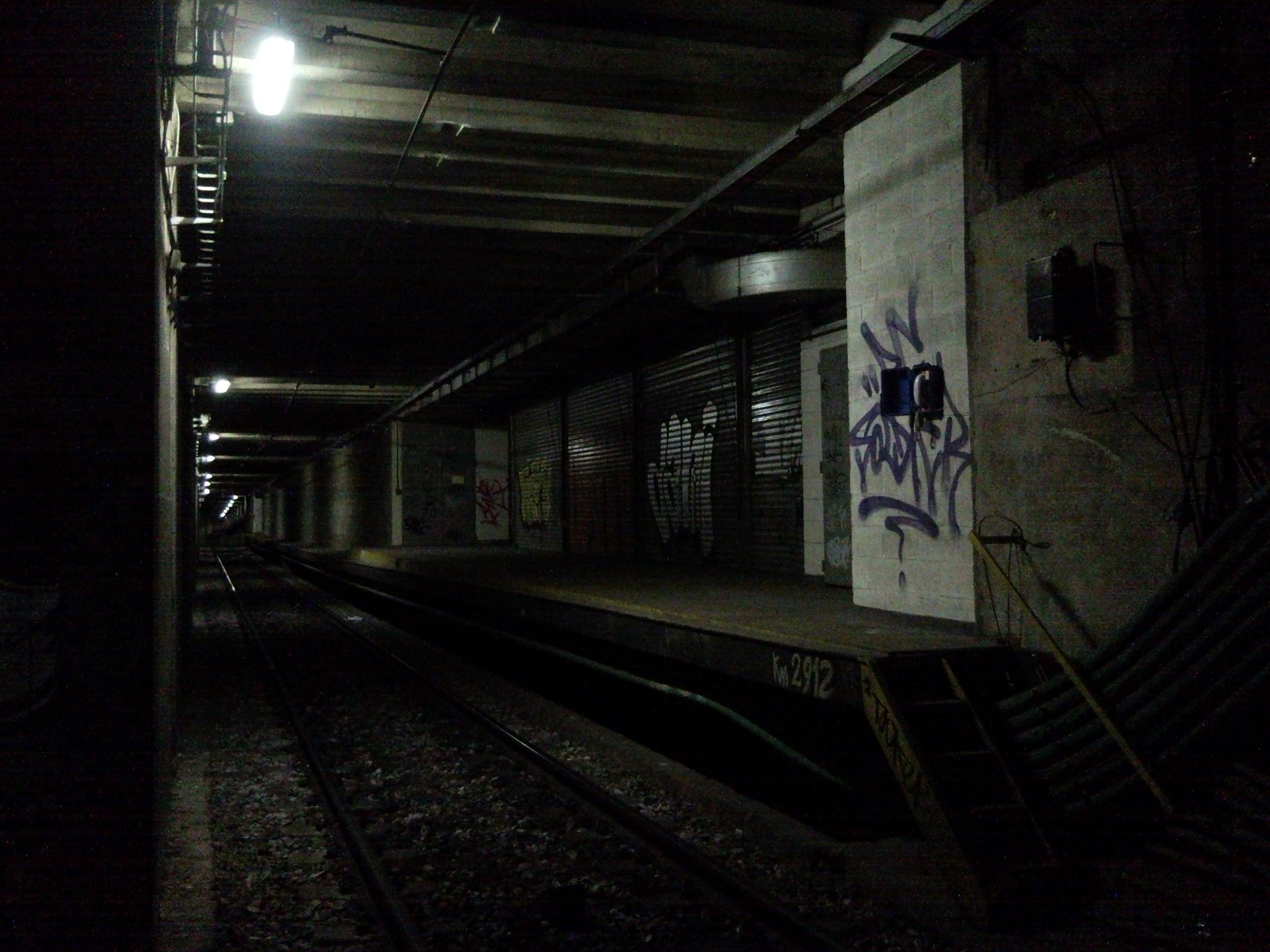

General information
- Location: Avenida Rivadavia and Alberti
- Coordinates: 34°36′35.5″S 58°24′06.4″W
- Platforms: Single side platform

History
- Opened: 1913
- Closed: 1953
Location

Alberti Norte is a ghost station in the Buenos Aires Underground, which was part of Line A until its closure in 1953. It is one of two ghost stations on the line, the other being Pasco Sur.

== History ==
The station was originally opened in 1913, as one of the original Line A stations opened that year. The station was unusual for the network in the sense that it only had one platform, serving only trains heading towards Plaza de Mayo, with the opposite platform located some metres away at Alberti station.

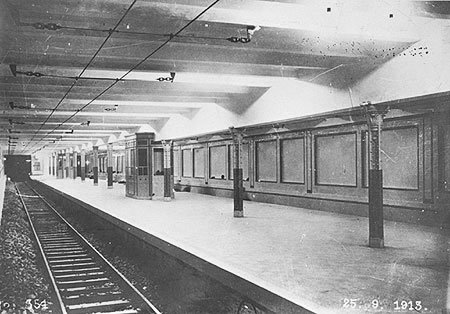
The station in 1913.

Given its proximity to Pasco's northern platform (located just 124 metres away), both Alberti Norte and Pasco Sur stations were closed in 1953 in order to improve the line's frequency, since the close proximity of stations in that part of the line meant that trains could never accelerate to full speed before having to stop again.

Upon the closure of the station, passengers could still see the unaltered station for many years from the line's trains. In the mid-1980s, the platform even had a display showing the early years of the Underground, complete with mannequins dressed in 1920s clothing.

When the Underground services were privatised by concession to Metrovías in the 1990s, the company closed up the platform and turned it into an electrical substation for the line. The entrance to the station from Rivadavia Avenue still exists, though it is sealed with a door only for maintenance personnel.

== Urban myths ==
There are a number of urban myths surrounding the station. The most popular of these claims that when the station was being built, two railway workers were buried alive and their deaths were covered up and never reported to the local media. Subte workers and passengers of the line claim that if one takes the last train of the line (23:30) then the railway workers can be seen on the platform, with shovels in hand, following the gaze of passengers until the train passed. Another myth claims that if the lights went out on the old La Brugeoise cars when passing the station, one could see passengers dressed in period clothing waiting on the platform.

== See also ==
- San José vieja - Ghost station on Line E
- Constitución - Ghost station on Line E
- Pasco Sur - Ghost station on Line A
