= San Juan (Buenos Aires Underground) =

Buenos Aires Underground station

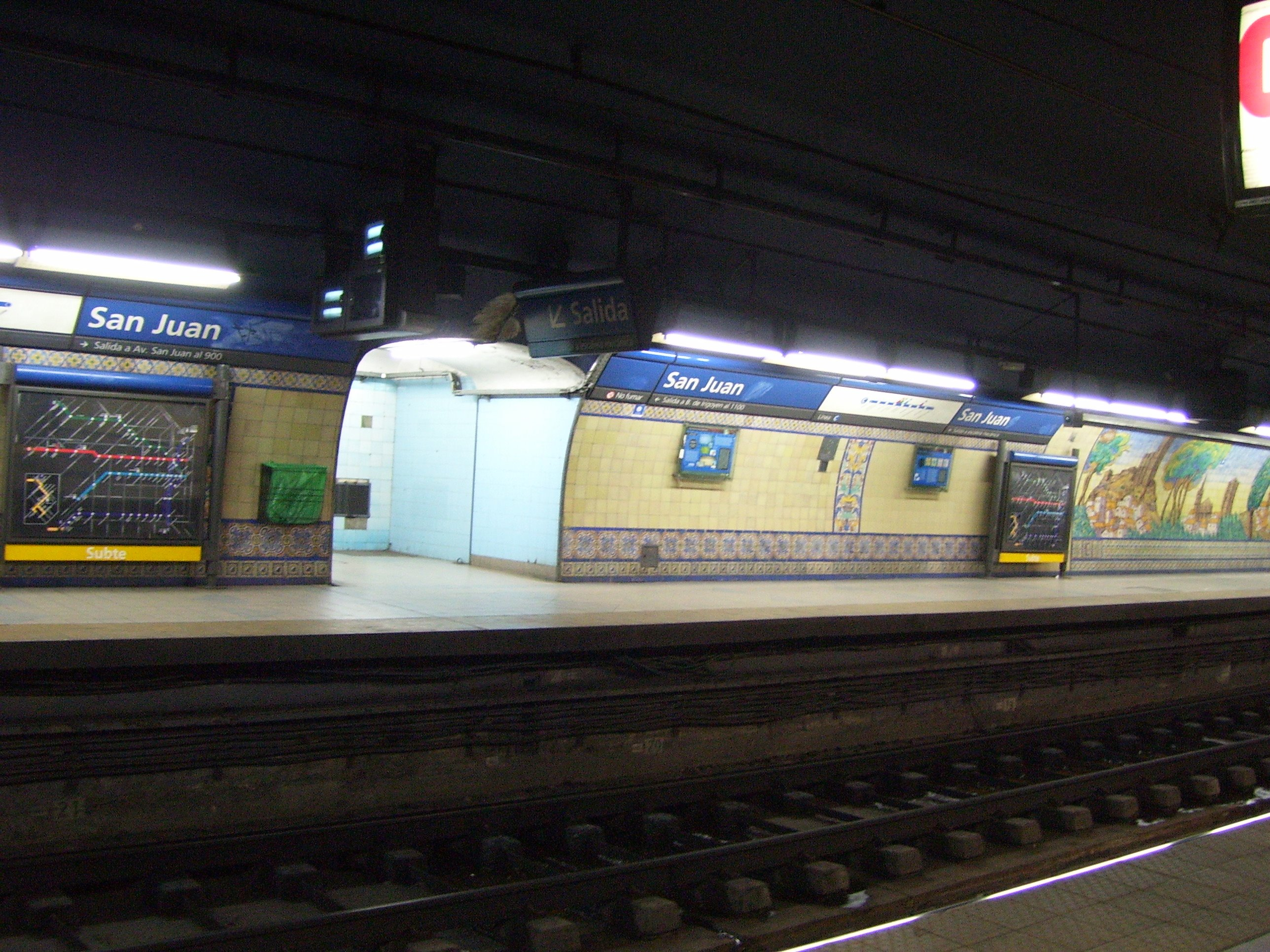

General information
- Location: Bernardo de Irigoyen and San Juan
- Coordinates: 34°37′18.9″S 58°22′48″W
- Platforms: Side platforms

History
- Opened: 9 November 1934

Services
Preceding station	Buenos Aires Underground	Following station
Independencia towards Retiro	Line C	Constitución Terminus
Location

San Juan is a station on Line C of the Buenos Aires Underground. The station was opened on 9 November 1934 as part of the inaugural section of the line, from Constitución to Diagonal Norte.
