= 1913 Maltese general election =

General elections were held in Malta on 15 December 1913. All eight elected seats were uncontested as the members elected in 1912 were all returned unopposed.

== Background ==
The elections were held under the Chamberlain Constitution, with members elected from eight single-member constituencies.

| District | Towns |
|---|---|
| I | Valletta East |
| II | Valletta West, Msida, Sliema, St. Julian's |
| III | Floriana, Pietà, Ħamrun, Qormi, Żebbuġ |
| IV | Cospicua, Birgu, Kalkara, Żabbar, Marsaskala |
| V | Senglea, New Village, Luqa, Gudja, Għaxaq, Żejtun, Marsaxlokk, Saint George's Bay and Birżebbuġa |
| VI | Birkirkara, Balzan, Lija, Attard, Għargħur, Naxxar, Mosta, Mellieħa |
| VII | Mdina, Rabat, Siġġiewi, Dingli, Qrendi, Mqabba, Żurrieq, Bubaqra, Safi, Kirkop |
| VIII | Gozo and Comino |
Source: Schiavone, p17

== Results ==
A total of 8,252 people were registered to vote, but no votes were cast.

| Constituency | Name | Votes | Notes |
|---|---|---|---|
| I | Andrè Pullicino | – | Re-elected unopposed |
| II | G Caruana Mamo | – | Re-elected unopposed |
| III | Antonio Dalli | – | Re-elected unopposed |
| IV | John O'Neill | – | Re-elected unopposed |
| V | G Felice Inglott | – | Re-elected unopposed |
| VI | Salv. dei Conti Sant Manduca | – | Re-elected unopposed |
| VII | Giuseppe Zammit | – | Re-elected unopposed |
| VIII | Giuseppe Mizzi | – | Re-elected unopposed |
Source: Schiavone, p182
