= Sáenz Peña (Buenos Aires Underground) =

Buenos Aires Underground station

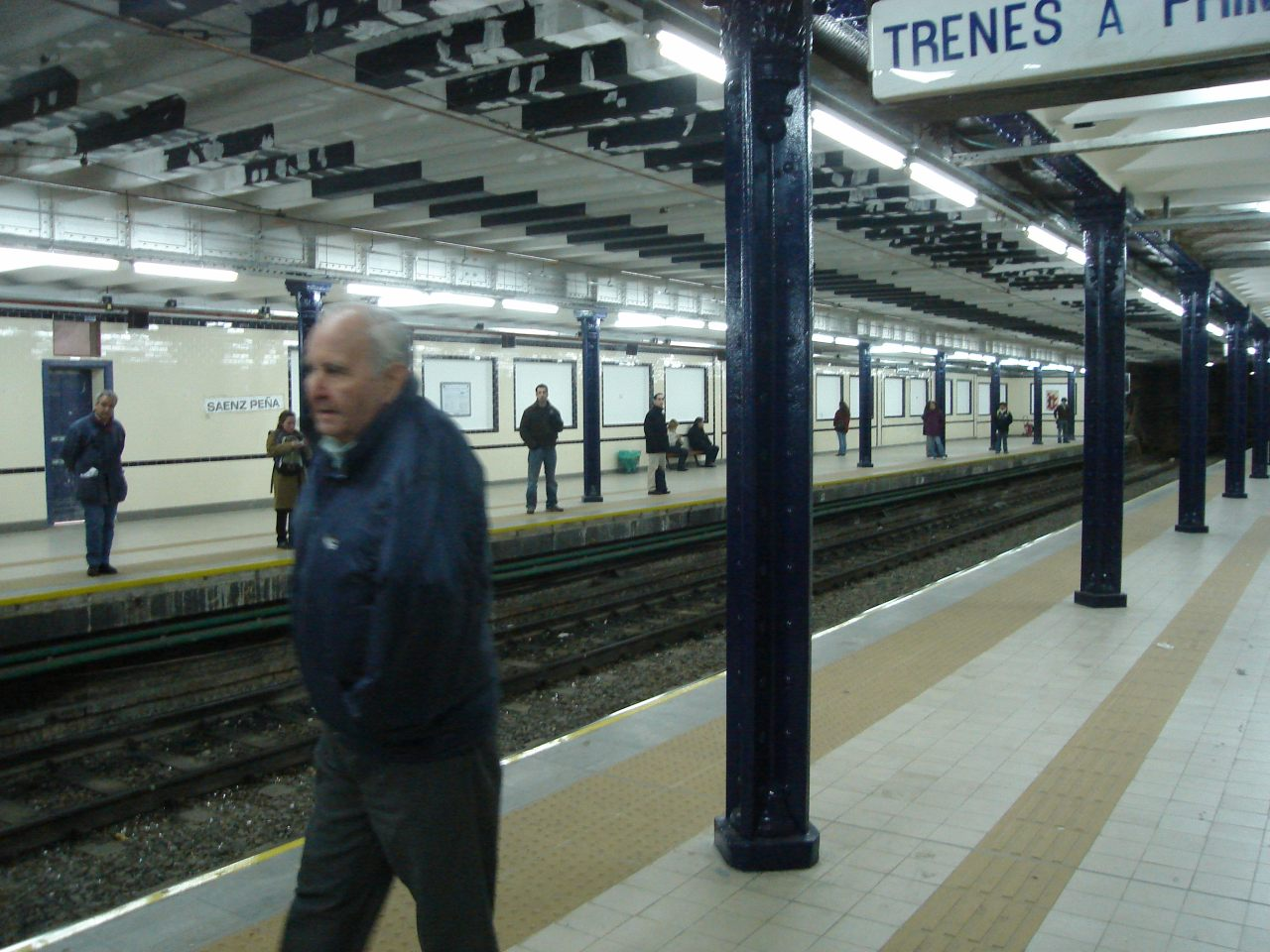

General information
- Location: Avenida de Mayo and Luis Sáenz Peña
- Coordinates: 34°36′34″S 58°23′12.5″W
- Platforms: Side platforms

History
- Opened: 1 December 1913

Services
Preceding station	Buenos Aires Underground	Following station
Congreso towards San Pedrito	Line A	Lima towards Plaza de Mayo
Location

Sáenz Peña is a station on Line A of the Buenos Aires Underground. It is the last station of the line located under the Avenida de Mayo in the neighbourhood of Monserrat. The station belonged to the inaugural section of the Buenos Aires Underground opened on 1 December 1913, which linked the stations Plaza Miserere and Plaza de Mayo.
