= Hugo Kaulen =

German balloonist

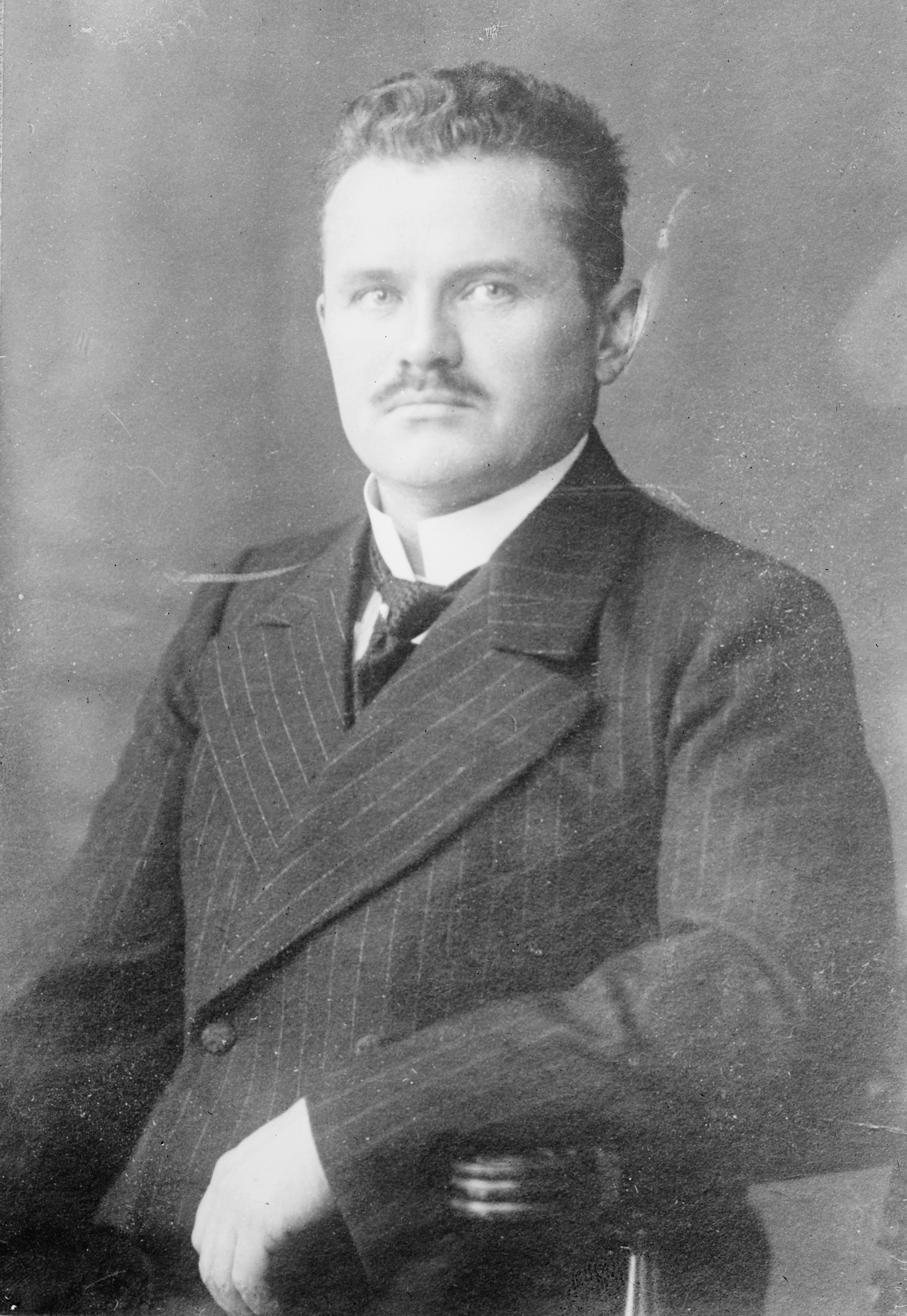

Hugo Kaulen Sr. (28 October 1869 - 9 July 1954) was a pioneering German balloonist.

== Biography ==
He was born on 28 October 1869 in Ronsdorf. He had a son, Dr. Hugo Kaulen. Jr.

From 13 to 17 December 1913 he stayed aloft for 87 hours. His record lasted until 1976. He died on 9 July 1954 in Wuppertal.
