= Congreso (Buenos Aires Underground) =

Buenos Aires Underground station

General information
- Location: Avenida Rivadavia and Avenida Callao
- Coordinates: 34°36′33.4″S 58°23′34.1″W
- Platforms: Side platforms

History
- Opened: 1 December 1913

Services
Preceding station	Buenos Aires Underground	Following station
Pasco towards San Pedrito	Line A	Sáenz Peña towards Plaza de Mayo
Location

Congreso is a station on Line A of the Buenos Aires Underground. It lies at the intersection of Rivadavia and Callao avenues, in the neighborhood of Balvanera. It is located just metres from the Palace of the Argentine National Congress. The station belonged to the inaugural section of the Buenos Aires Underground opened on 1 December 1913, which linked the stations Plaza Miserere and Plaza de Mayo.

== Gallery ==
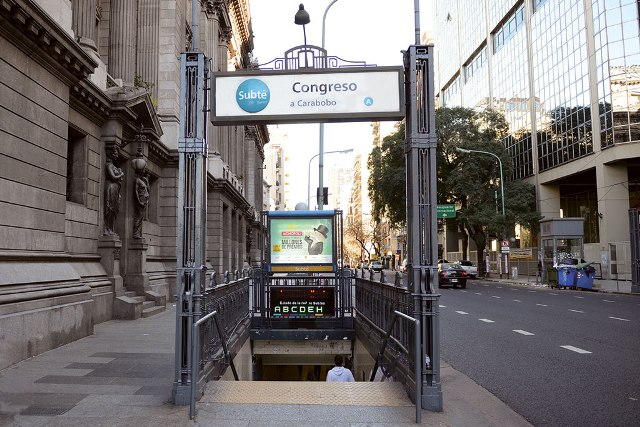

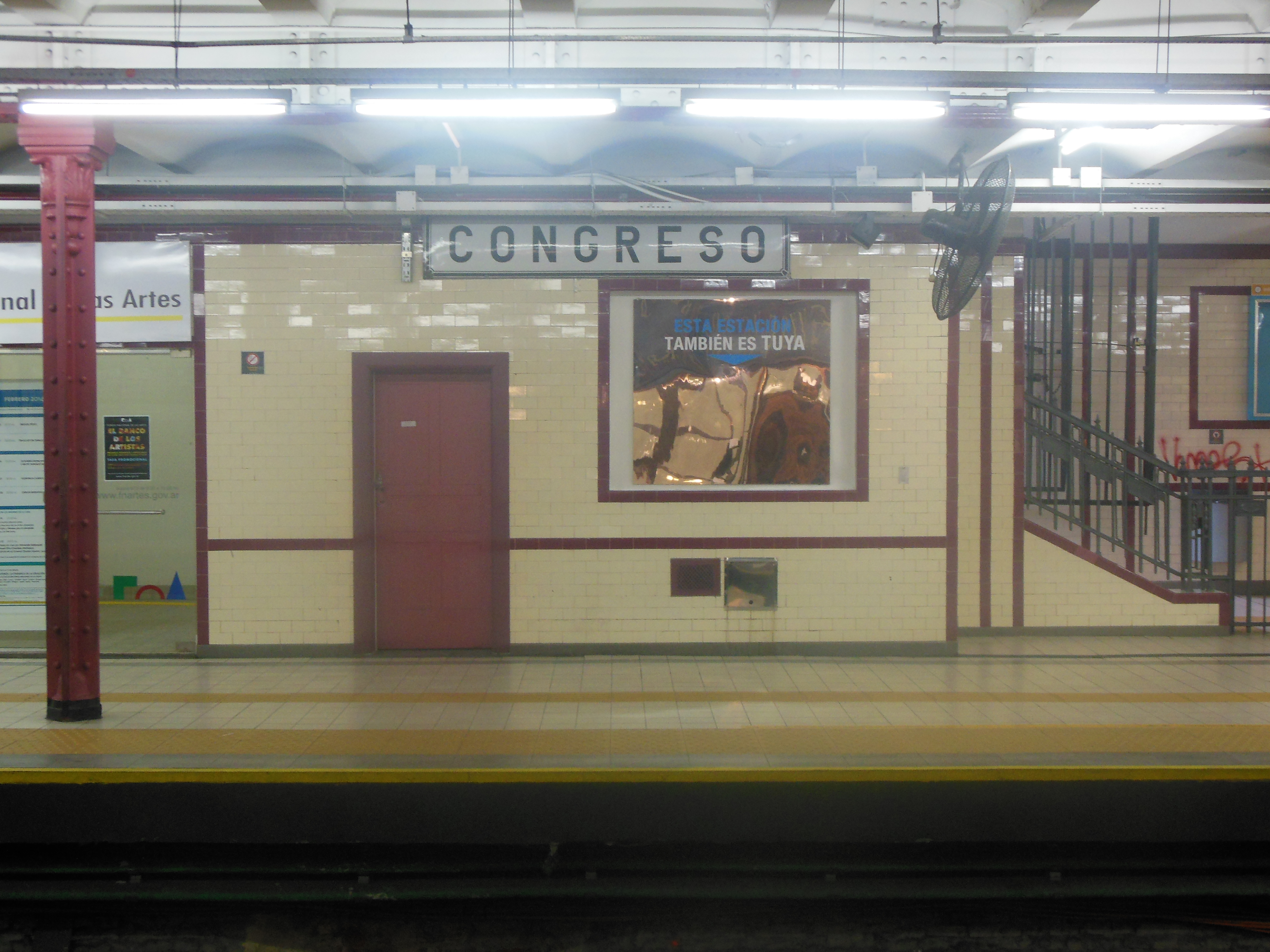

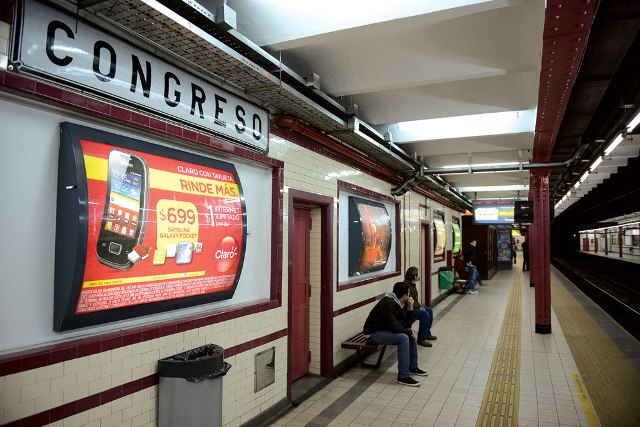

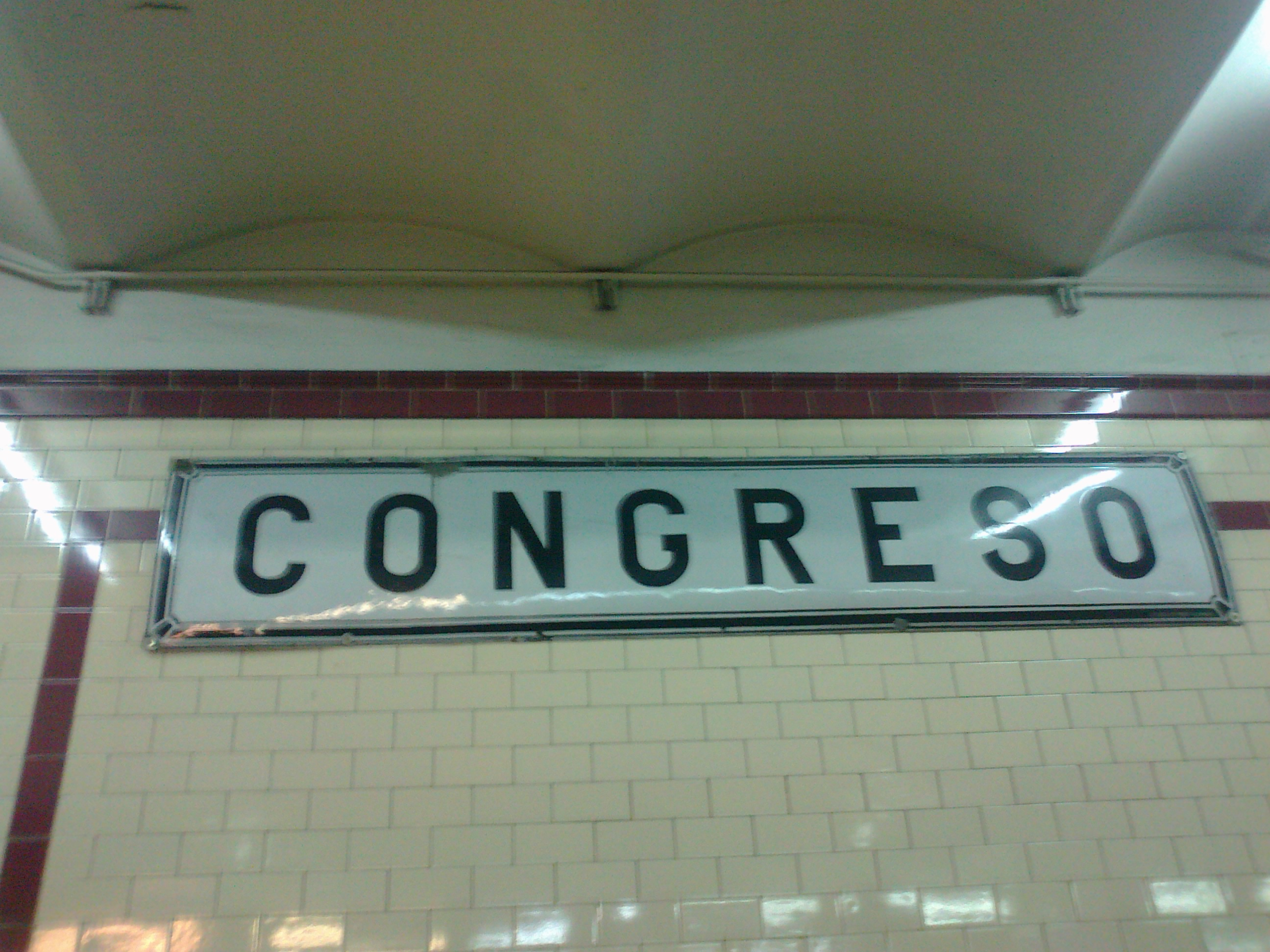

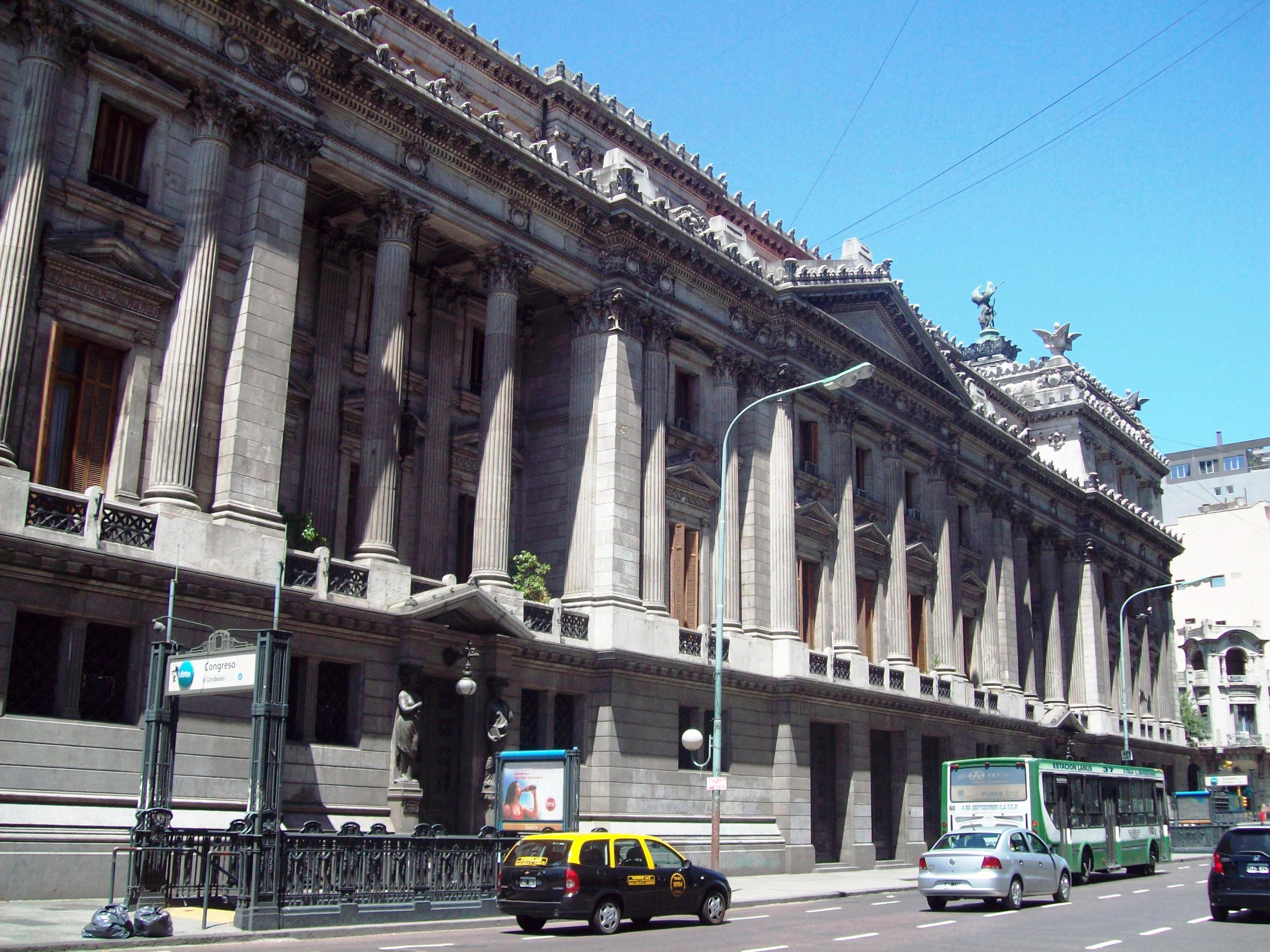

== Nearby ==
- Argentine National Congress
- Congressional Plaza
- Confitería El Molino
