= 1912 Maltese general election =

General elections were held in Malta on 16 and 17 October 1912. Only two of the eight elected seats were contested.

== Background ==
The elections were held under the Chamberlain Constitution, with members elected from eight single-member constituencies.

District	Towns
I	Valletta East
II	Valletta West, Msida, Sliema, St. Julian's
III	Floriana, Pietà, Ħamrun, Qormi, Żebbuġ
IV	Cospicua, Birgu, Kalkara, Żabbar, Marsaskala
V	Senglea, New Village, Luqa, Gudja, Għaxaq, Żejtun, Marsaxlokk, Saint George's Bay and Birżebbuġa
VI	Birkirkara, Balzan, Lija, Attard, Għargħur, Naxxar, Mosta, Mellieħa
VII	Mdina, Rabat, Siġġiewi, Dingli, Qrendi, Mqabba, Żurrieq, Bubaqra, Safi, Kirkop
VIII	Gozo and Comino
Source: Schiavone, p17

== Results ==
A total of 8,812 people were registered to vote.

Constituency	Name	Votes	Notes
I	Andrè Pullicino	403	Re-elected
II	G Caruana Mamo	–	Unopposed
III	Antonio Dalli	–	Re-elected unopposed (previously from constituency VI)
IV	John O'Neill	–	Unopposed
V	G Felice Inglott	688	
VI	Salv. dei Conti Sant Manduca	–	Unopposed
VII	Giuseppe Zammit	–	Unopposed
VIII	Giuseppe Mizzi	–	Unopposed
Source: Schiavone, p182
