= Park Ridge Public Library =

Library in Park Ridge, Illinois, US

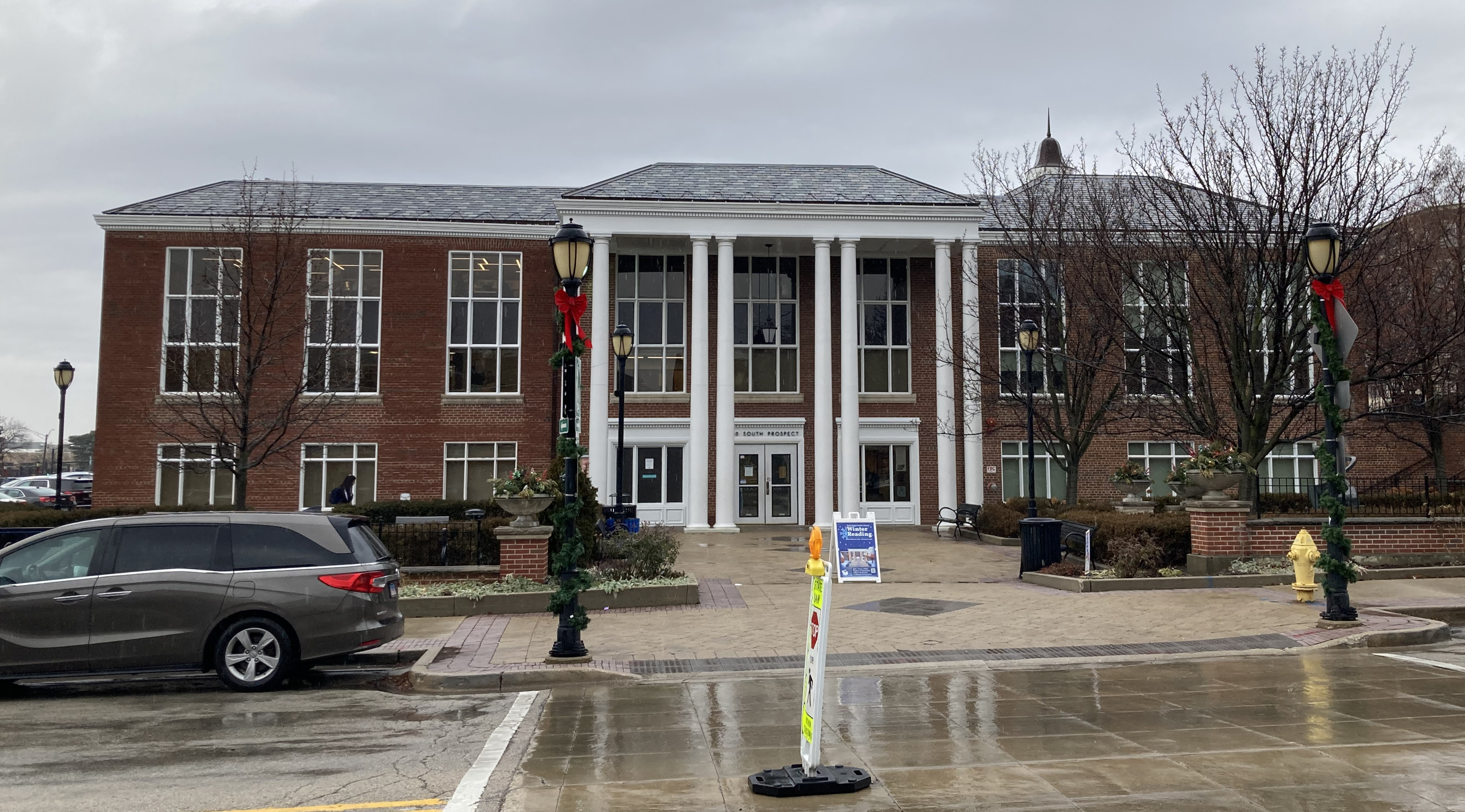
- 42°00′39″N 87°49′50″W
- Location: 20 S Prospect Ave, Park Ridge, Illinois, USA
- Type: Public library
- Established: December 6, 1913

Collection
- Size: 176,398

Access and use
- Circulation: 540,368
- Population served: 37,480

The Park Ridge Public Library serves residents and businesses of the city of Park Ridge, Illinois. Park Ridge is a northwest suburb of Chicago. The library serves a population of 39,650 residents and is located at 20 South Prospect Avenue, Park Ridge, Illinois 60068 in the Uptown neighborhood. The purpose of the Park Ridge Public Library is to advance human knowledge and understanding by providing access to information, literature, technology, and the arts relevant to the community it serves.

== History ==
The library, which was established with a $7,500 grant from the Carnegie Foundation, opened to the public on December 6, 1913. Originally the library was open 10 hours a week which was increased to 15 hours in 1923 and 61 hours in 1932. A thousand books were donated to the new library by the George Carpenter Estate. The total book collection consisted of 2,072 volumes. Upon opening, the library had only two paid staff members. The library was originally located at 1 N. Northwest Highway. That building served as the City's library for 44 years until a new one was built across the street. The current library was built in 1958. An addition was added in 1977 that doubled the size of the building.

== Resources ==
The Park Ridge Public Library has a collection of approximately 175,000 items with an annual circulation of over 500,000 items.

== Services ==
Each department offers a variety of services to the residents of Park Ridge.

- Reference Department
- Readers Services Department
- Young Adult Department
- Children's Department

Free programs for adults include:

- Art lectures
- Music performances
- Cooking demonstrations
- Theatrical presentations
- Health programs
- Feature films
- Foreign films
- Travel films
