= Saburō Takata =

Japanese composer (1913–2000)

Saburo Takata
- Born: 18 December 1913; Japan Aichi Nagoya
- Died: 22 October 2000 (aged 86); Japan Tokyo
- Other name: 髙田 三郎
- Occupation: composer

Saburō Takata (高田 三郎, Nagoya 18 December 1913 – 22 October 2000) was a Japanese Roman Catholic composer.

== Works, editions and recordings ==
- Takuboku Tankashu 8 songs - Recording: Kazumichi Ohno (tenor), Kyosuke Kobayashi (piano). Thorofon 1994
