= Alberti (Buenos Aires Underground) =

Buenos Aires Underground station

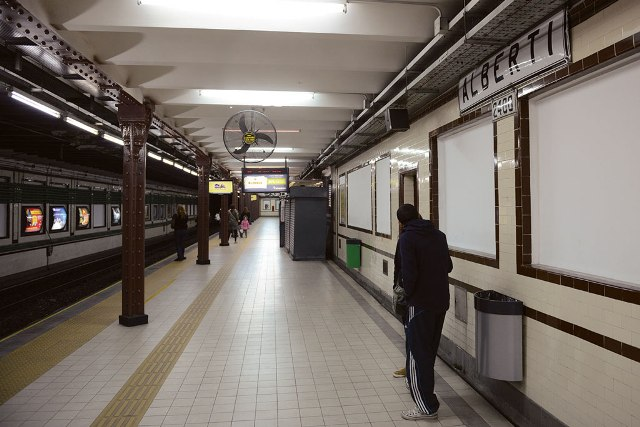

General information
- Location: Avenida Rivadavia and Alberti
- Coordinates: 34°36′35.5″S 58°24′4.9″W
- Platforms: Single side platform

History
- Opened: 1 December 1913

Services
Preceding station	Buenos Aires Underground	Following station
Plaza Miserere towards San Pedrito	Line A	Pasco towards Plaza de Mayo
Location

Alberti is a station on Line A of the Buenos Aires Underground. The station belonged to the inaugural section of the Buenos Aires Underground opened on 1 December 1913, which linked the stations Plaza Miserere and Plaza de Mayo. Like the Pasco station, it is one of two stations of the line which only has one platform, in this case only serving passengers heading towards San Pedrito. The other platform (the ghost station Alberti Norte) is located just a few meters away, but was closed in 1953 since the proximity of Pasco station meant having so many stops in such quick succession slowed the line's frequency.
