= Pasco (Buenos Aires Underground) =

Buenos Aires Underground station

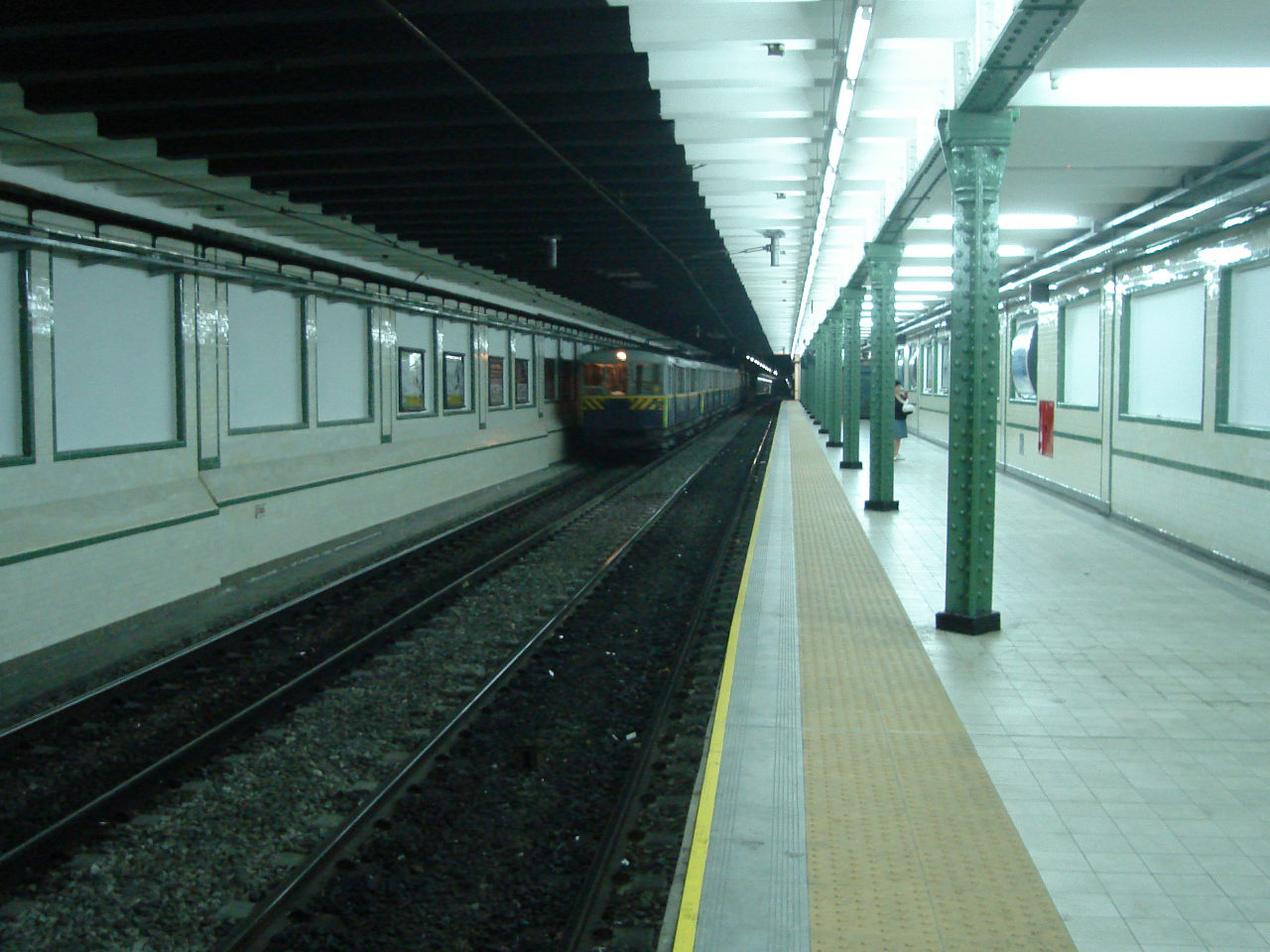

General information
- Location: Avenida Rivadavia and Pasco
- Coordinates: 34°36′34.8″S 58°23′54.4″W
- Platforms: Single side platform

History
- Opened: 1913

Services
Preceding station	Buenos Aires Underground	Following station
Alberti towards San Pedrito	Line A	Congreso towards Plaza de Mayo
Location

Pasco is a station on Line A of the Buenos Aires Underground. The station belonged to the inaugural section of the Buenos Aires Underground, opened on 1 December 1913, which linked the stations Plaza Miserere and Plaza de Mayo. Like the Alberti station, it only has one platform, which in this case only serves passengers traveling to Plaza de Mayo. The other platform (the ghost station Pasco Sur) is just a few meters away, but it was closed in 1953 since the proximity of Alberti station meant that so many stops in such quick succession slowed the line's frequency.

== Gallery ==
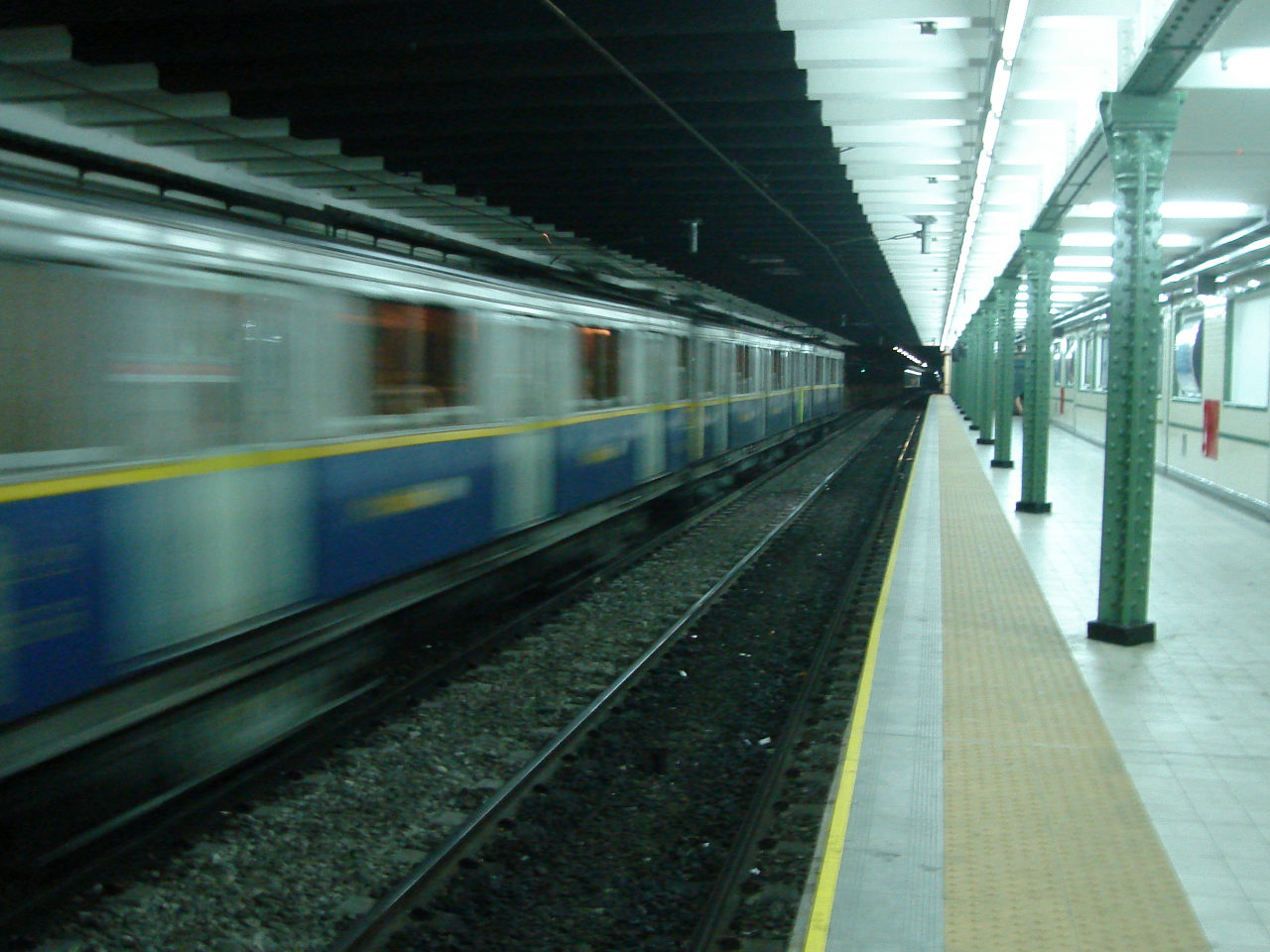

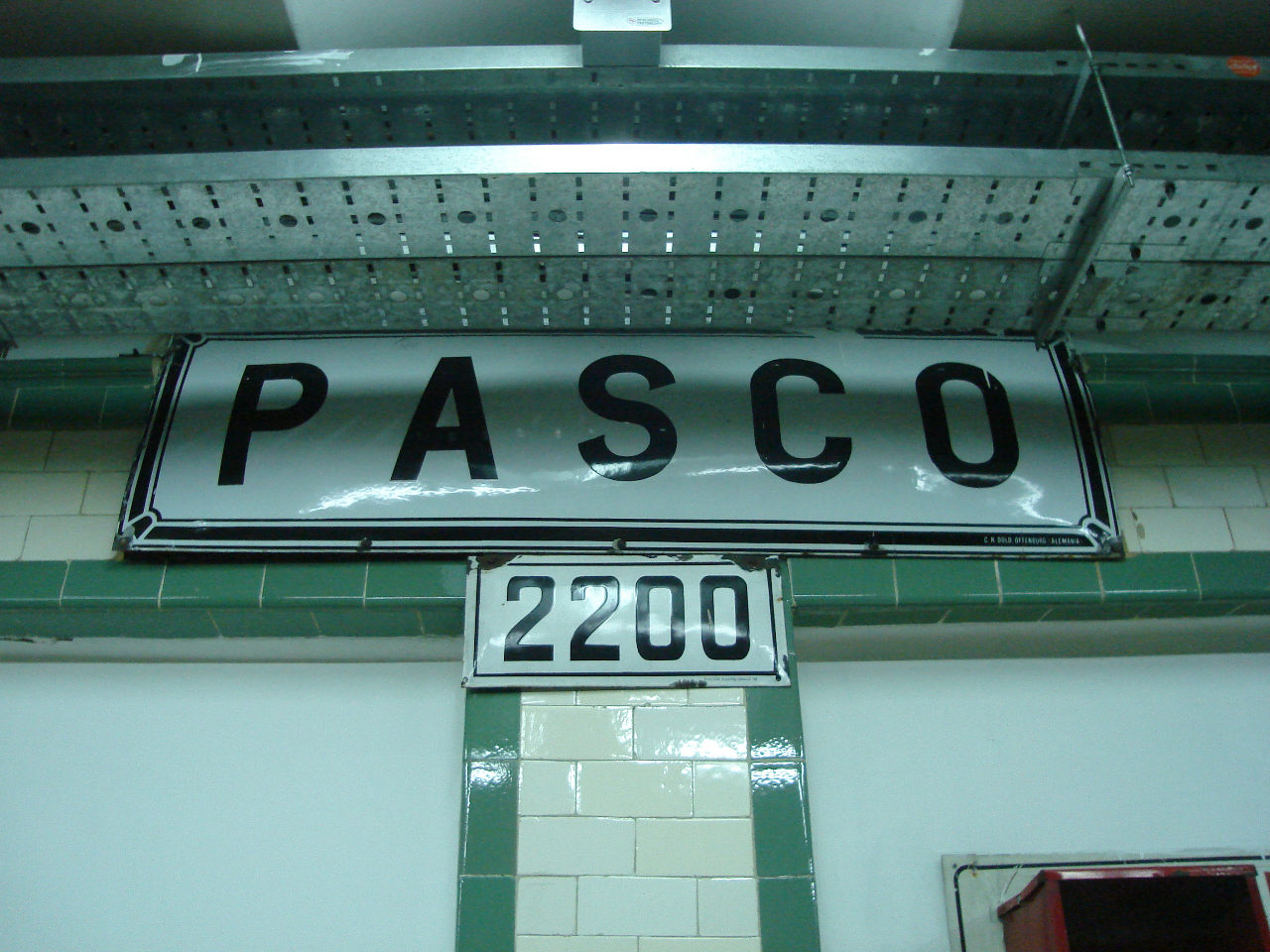

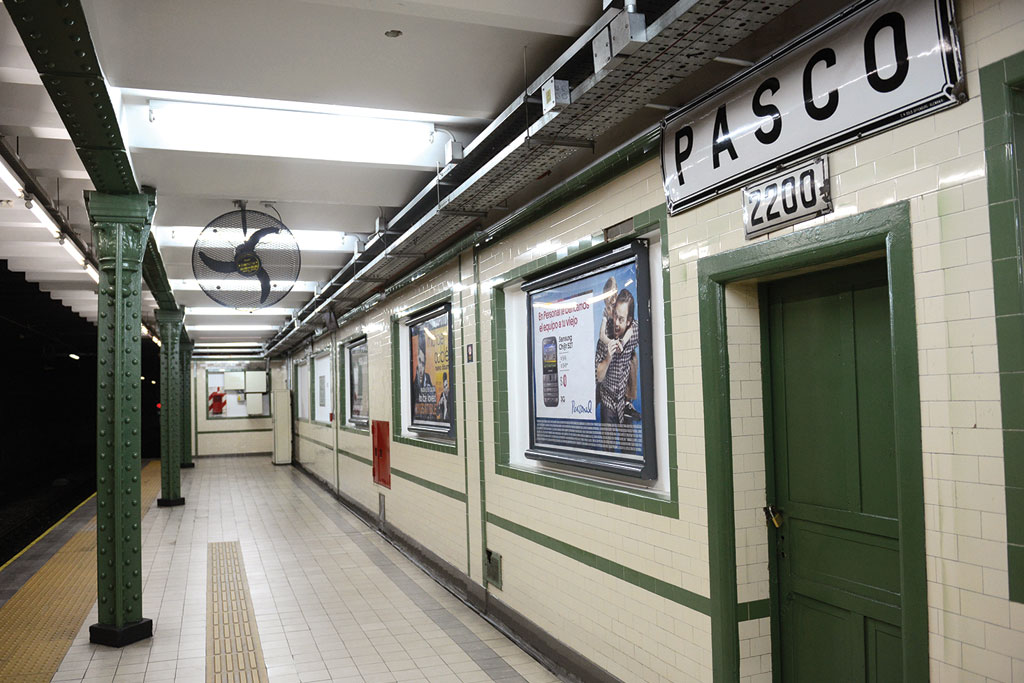
