= Old Berlin Horse station =

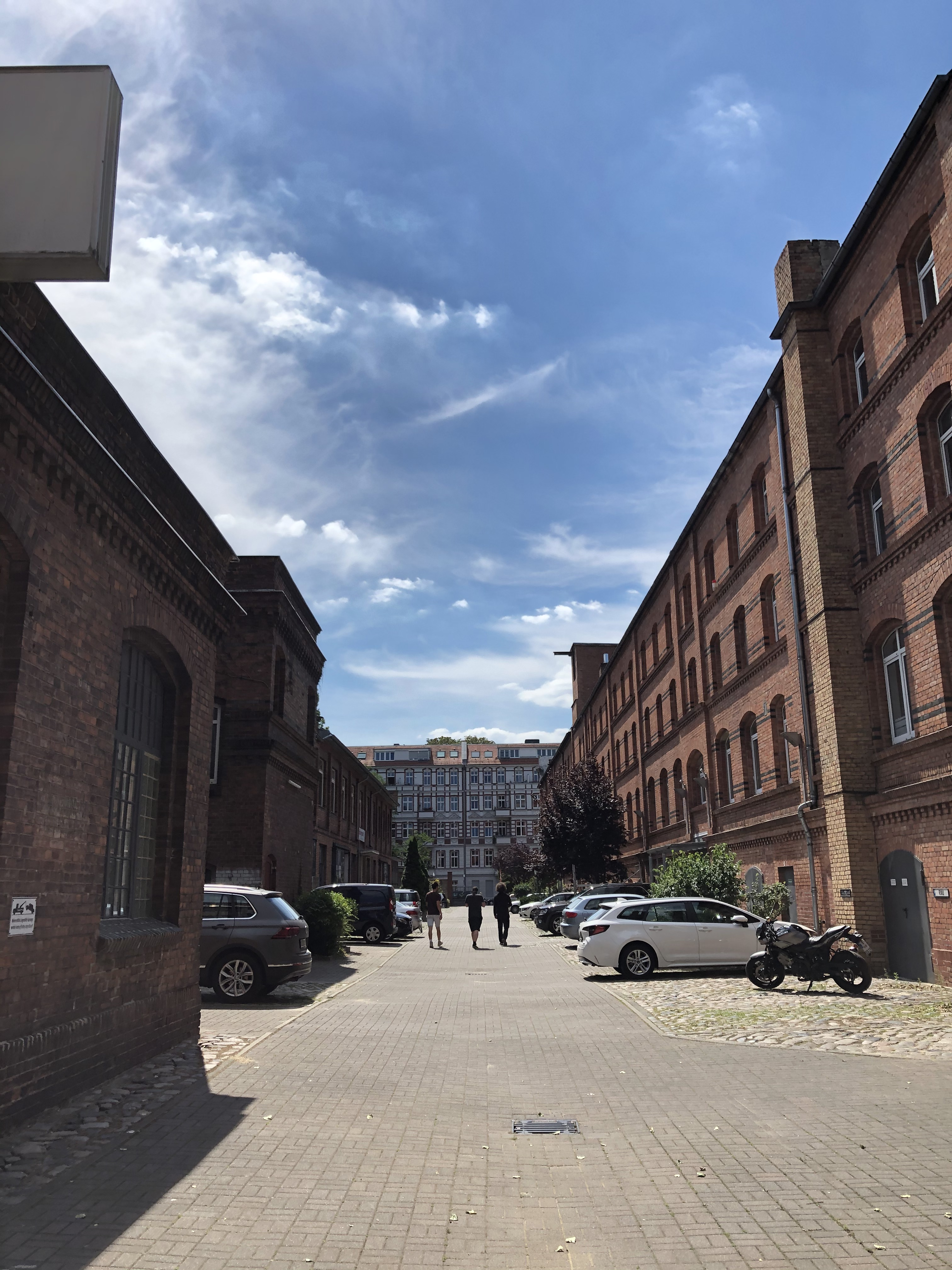
The Berliner Pferdebahnhof commissioned in 1891 by the Große Berliner Pferdeeisenbahn AG and built by architect Joseph Fischer-Dick

History of the Berliner Pferdebahnhof

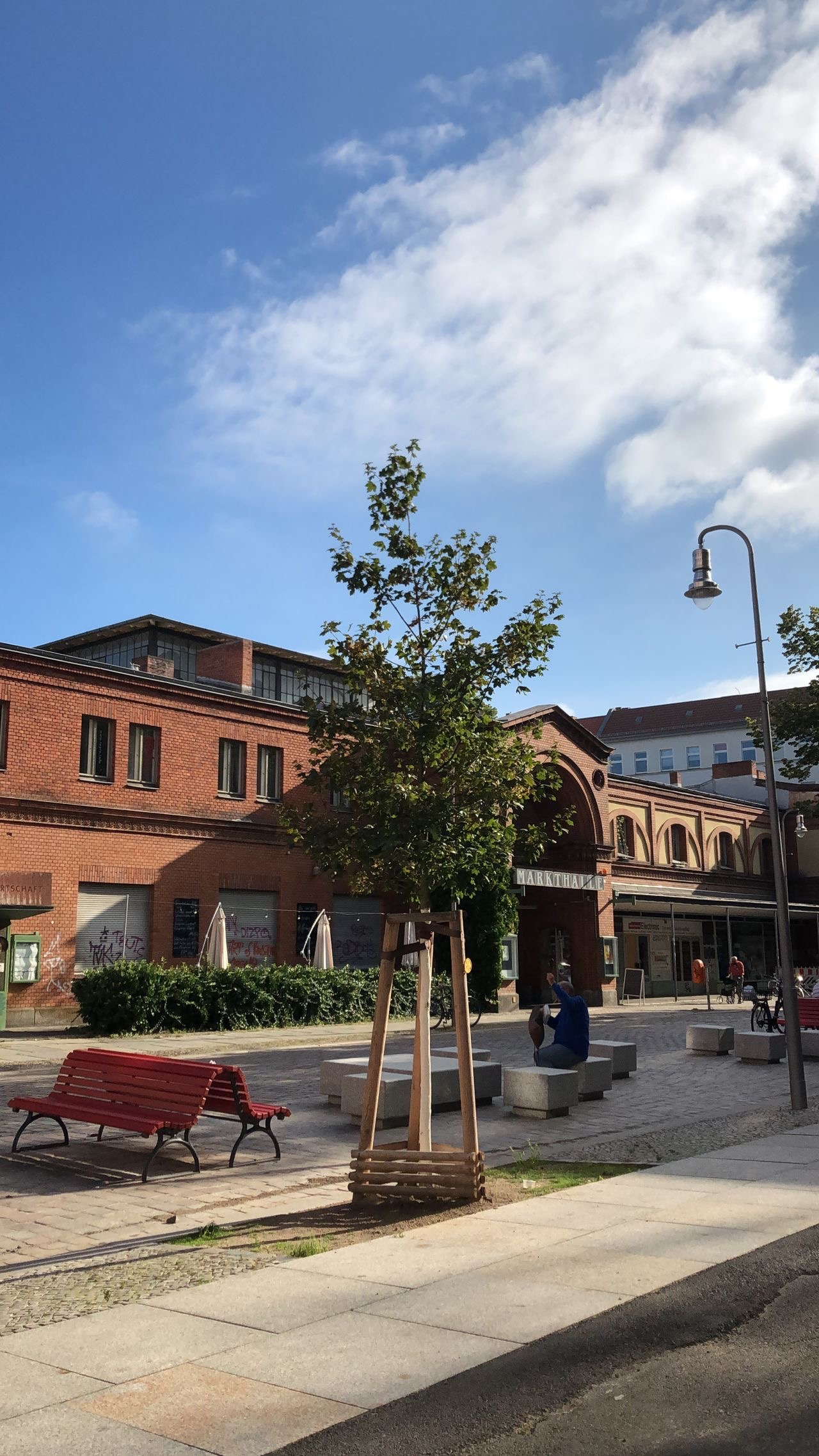
Arminiusmarkthalle Built in 1891 by Hermann Blankenstein and August Lindemann

The buildings were built in 1891 as the last Pferdebahnhof (Horse Station) for the Große Berliner Pferdeeisenbahn AG (Great Berlin Horse Railway company), which was founded in 1871 and began operations in 1873 with its first line number 8 from Gesundbrunnen to Rosenthaler Platz. The buildings were designed by master architect Joseph Fischer-Dick who was commissioned by Kaiser Wilhelm II to design various buildings in the city including the historic Wiebehallen on Wiebestraße. Joseph Fischer-Dick worked with master masons and carpenters Stiebitz and Köppchen to build the Pferdebahnhof on Waldenserstraße.

This was the largest and last built station for an industry that was soon taken over by electricity. This was also the only building designed and built from start to finish by the Große Berliner Pferdeeisenbahn AG (Great Berlin Horse Railway company). At this time there was also 2 other stations in the inner city locality of Moabit one at Waldstraße 41-42 and another at Stromstraße 52. The two older stations in Moabit were not enough to service the growing Berlin population at that time. Which in turn lead the company to build the larger Berliner Pferdebahnhof. The building on the left, which is depicted in the photograph on the right was a two-story building that stored around 70 wagons at the time to pull passenger. The building on the right use to house around 500 horses on the first and second floors.

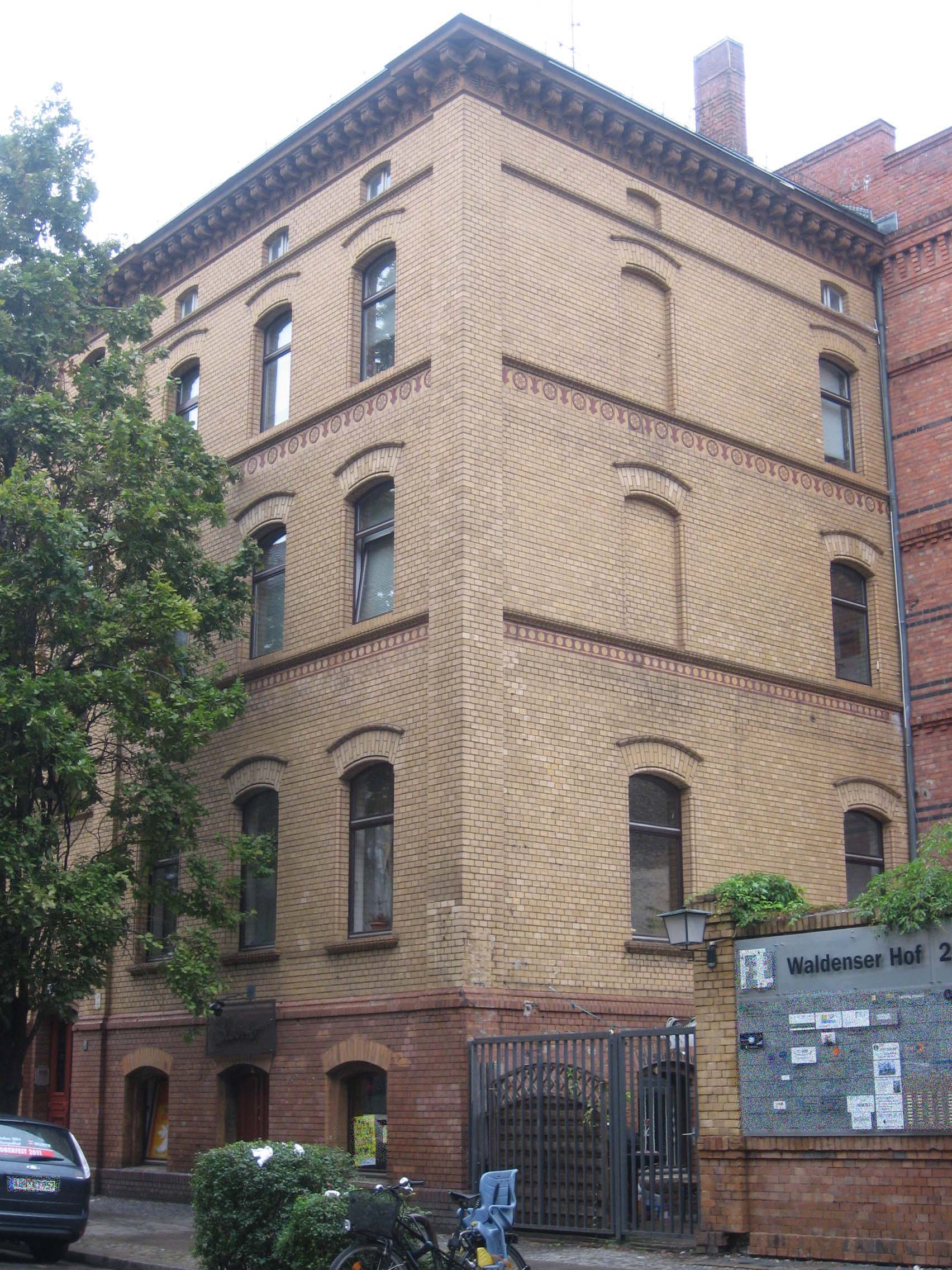
Front Administration Building for the - Große Berliner Pferdeeisenbahn AG (Great Berlin Horse Railway company)

Still, today when you walk the compound you can see the old Prussian cap covers and the ramp accesses in the buildings which were used to access the horse stables on the upper floors. The buildings were designed to have a large court yard in between them where railroad tracks use to previously occupy the now brick road. The station was shut down in 1904 as the city turned to electricity and the horse-drawn roadways lost their importance. The Große Berliner Pferdeeisenbahn AG was later replaced by the Große Berliner Straßenbahn (GBS)

Location

The Berliner Pferdebahnhof is located in Moabit an inner city locality in the borough of Mitte, Berlin, Germany. Moabit was incorporated as a part of Berlin in 1861 and is a former industrial neighborhood located in the western part of the city. In addition to the Berliner Pferdebahnhof there are various other old industrial buildings still standing in Moabit such as the AEG's Turbine factory the Hamburger Bahnhof and the Westhafen port which is neighboring the district of Wedding. The Berliner Pferdebahnhof is located on Waldenserstraße 2–4 in direct vicinity of the Arminiusmarkthalle near Turmstraße. This is located just behind the Rathaus Tiergarten (Town Hall). The Arminiusmarkthalle was also constructed around the same time as the Berliner Pferdebahnhof in 1891. This is one of Berlin's last remaining market halls in the city and built in the same red bricks as the Berliner Pferdebahnhof. This building was heavily damaged in WW II and rebuilt in the 1950s. The building is now under national trust protection and is open for public use.

Present Day

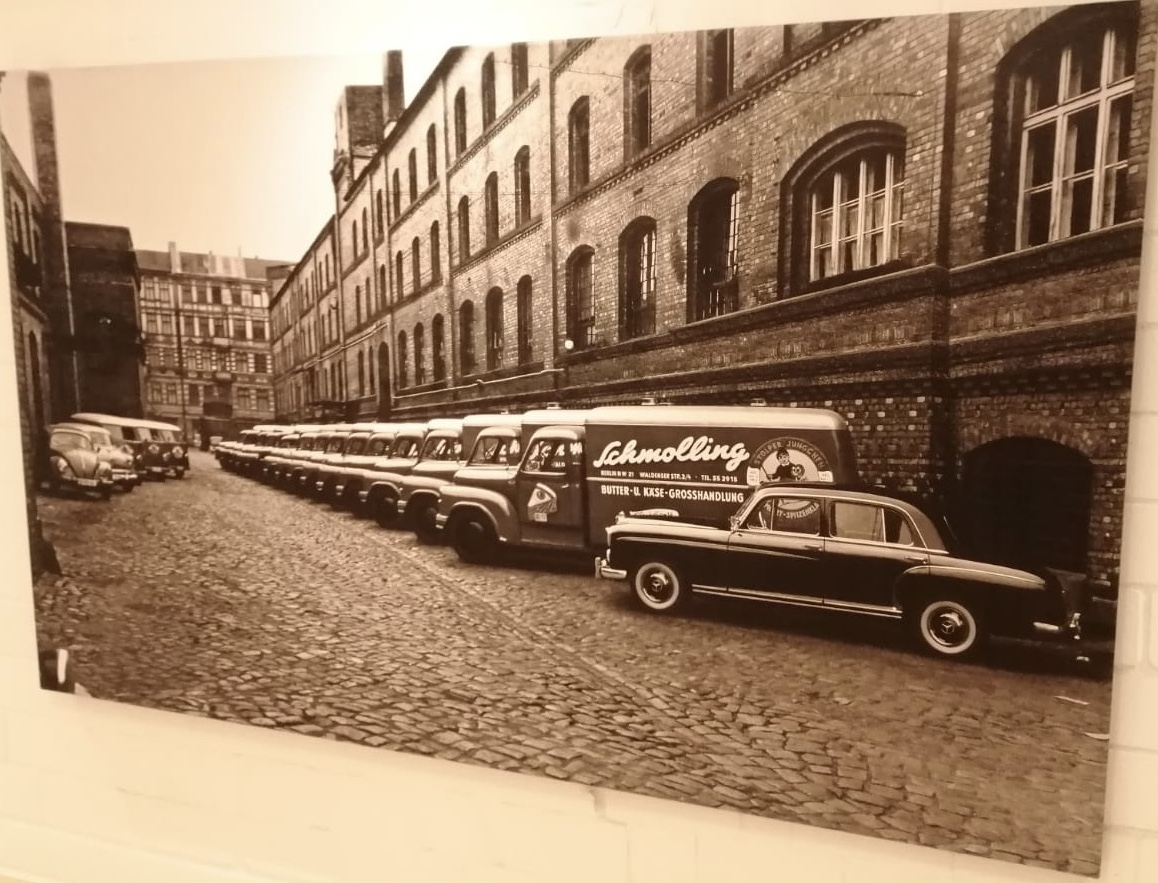
Schmolling Butter u. Käse Großhandlung Trucks (Butter & Cheese Wholesalers) Pictured at the Berliner Pferdebahnhof 1958

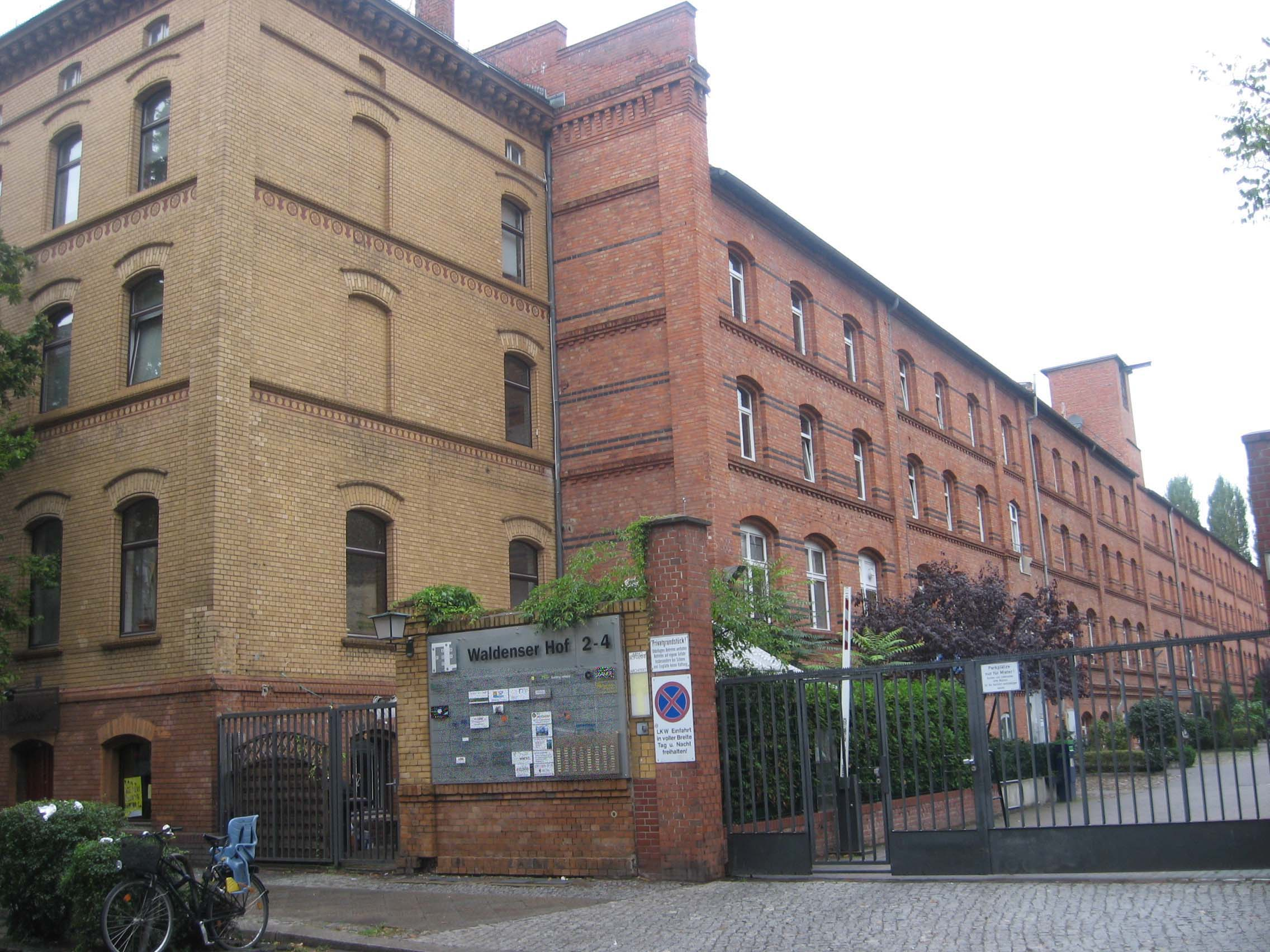
Berliner Pferdebahnhof (2011)

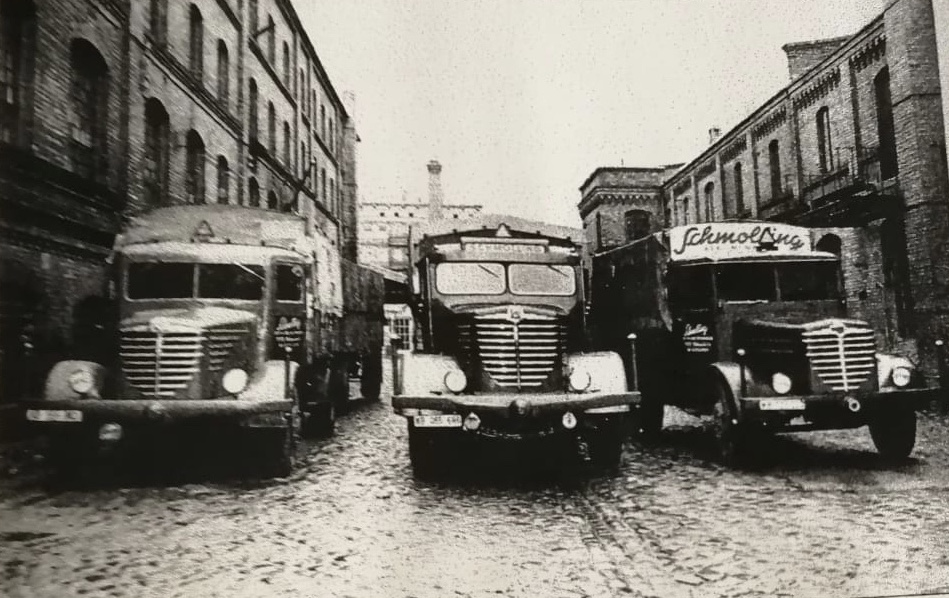
Schmolling Frischdienst für Molkereiprodukte at the Berliner Pferdebahnhof in Moabit, Mitte, Berlin

The Berliner Pferdebahnhof is designated as a building monument (Baudenkmal) by the city of Berlin and German federal government. It is registered under the monument number 09050358 as the Berliner Pferdebahnhof. It is also referred to as the Pferdebahnhof Moabit by numerous sources due to its location within the city of Berlin. The buildings were slightly damaged during WW II, but restored shortly after in the 1950s. After the end of the Große Berliner Pferdeeisenbahn AG the buildings were taken over by the Schmolling Family. The buildings were than used by Schmolling Frischdienst für Molkereiprodukte GmbH & Co Betriebs KG for a period of time, which use to provide the city of Berlin with various dairy products such as butter, milk, cheese and other various fresh produce products. Although, in the middle of the 1970s the building were no longer used as a dairy factory and logistic center. The buildings were than renovated and retired from industrial usage. They are presently being used for residential living and commercial office spaces housing organizations such as the Bildungsmarkt unternehmensverbund, which is a non-profit trade vocational training school in the city of Berlin.
