= Susan Ross =

Susan Ross may refer to:

- Susan Ross (Seinfeld), a character on the American sitcom Seinfeld
- Susan Ross (artist) (1915–2006), Canadian painter, printmaker, and illustrator
- Susan M. Ross, Canadian architect, educator, and academic

== See also ==
- Susan Penelope Rosse (1652–1700), English painter
