= Susan M. Ross =

Canadian architect

- Education: M.Sc. A. Planning (Conservation of the Built Environment), Université de Montréal; B. Arch & B. Sc., McGill University
- Alma mater: Université de Montréal, McGill University
- Known for: Architecture, Sustainable Heritage Conservation, Educator
- Notable work: Publications addressing the environmental legacies of 20th century building materials, and conservation methods. Conservation work on historic buildings.

Susan M. Ross, OAQ, MRAIC, FAPT, is a Canadian architect, educator, and academic who has held positions in multiple Canadian universities and worked nationally and internationally. She is known for her publications and teachings in sustainable Heritage Conservation in Canada. Her research into sustainable heritage conservation is expansive and ranges from understanding historic urban infrastructure landscapes to discerning the intersection of heritage and waste through deconstruction and reuse. Ross was inducted into the College of Fellows of the Association for Preservation Technology in 2013.

== Early life and education ==
Ross was born in Montréal, Quebec, Canada, and graduated with a Bachelor of Science (Architecture) and Bachelor's of Architecture from McGill University in 1985 and 1987, respectively. During and following her time at McGill, Ross was an architectural intern at multiple firms in Montréal, Quebec. After obtaining her professional license (OAQ) in 1992, Ross worked as an Intermediate Architect at LeMoyne Lapointe Magne Architects and Urban Planners. In 1995, Ross moved to Berlin, Germany, for work.

After working in Berlin, Germany, gaining experience with international design practices, Ross returned to Canada in 1999 to continue her studies. She obtained a Master of Science in Planning focusing on Conservation of the Built Environment in 2002 from the Université de Montréal. Her master's thesis looked at the transformation of the reservoir landscapes of Montreal's historic waterworks located in Mount Royal.

Since 2013, Ross has taken on multiple teaching and research roles, notably at Carleton University, where she is cross-appointed to the Azrieli School of Architecture and Urbanism and the School of Indigenous and Canadian Studies.

== Career ==
=== Practitioner ===
In 1985, Ross began her career as an Architect-intern at Irving Caruso Architect in Montréal. Post graduation, Ross went on to intern at Peter Rose Architect, working on the team for the Canadian Centre for Architecture buildings and site. Between 1990 and 1995 Ross delved into renovation, adaptive reuse, planning and landscape projects at LeMoyne Lapointe Magne Architects and Urban Planners in Montréal as an Intermediate Architect. She worked on public and educational architecture, as well as industrial infrastructure. Some notable projects include the renovation and adaptive reuse of two National Historic Sites: the Marché Bonsecours, a market in Montréal, as well as the Old Customs House, also in Montréal.

From 1995 to 1999, Ross worked as a consulting architect in Berlin, Germany. During these years, she participated in various urban design proposals for Berlin and the surrounding region, designed a proposal for an infill office building on Rosenthaler Platz, and completed the design and detailed development for an addition to an industrial factory in Stuttgart.

Ross has maintained her private practice doing renovation work on private residences since 1992.

Between 2002 and 2013, Susan Ross was a Senior Conservation Architect with Public Works and Government Services Canada. She performed building investigations, analysis, and conservation planning and developed policies for tools and best practices related to conservation efforts. At this time, she led the development of the second edition of The Standards and Guidelines for the Conservation of Historic Places in Canada.

=== Educator ===
Ross has taught architecture, sustainable heritage conservation, cultural landscapes and place-making at the university level in Ontario and Québec. Since 2013, Ross has been an assistant professor, then associate professor in the School of Indigenous and Canadian Studies at Carleton University in Ottawa, Ontario. Since 2021, she has been cross-appointed to the Azrieli School of Architecture and Urbanism.

Since 2014, she has published over forty case studies about sustainable heritage conservation in Canada produced by students for her course on Heritage conservation and sustainability.

Since 2021 she has been a lead organizer of Just Transitions, Heritage Education for Climate Adaptation. This included convening the first online Icomos University Forum on Knowledge Areas for Climate Adaptation.

=== Research ===
Alongside a research team at Carleton University that has included Alison Creba, Kevin Complido, and Nansen Murray, Ross, since 2016, has centered her research on waste, specifically waste related to and around heritage resources. This can include demolition waste, and how salvage and or reuse fit into conservation. The research also addresses the sustainability of modern wood heritage in Canada, current policy and practice in heritage conservation and restoration, and how to remedy heritage waste moving forward in an age of more sustainable construction techniques.

In 2018 she organized a related symposium at Carleton University. In 2020 she coedited a special issue on Heritage and Waste Values of The Journal of Cultural Heritage Management and Sustainable Development.

== Author, editor and publications ==
Ross has contributed articles to publications such as Future Anterior: Journal of Historic Preservation, History Theory & Criticism, Journal of Cultural Heritage Management and Sustainable Development,Journal of Architectural Conservation, and Docomomo International Journal. She has also published chapters in edited books examining the intersection of conservation work and sustainable building practices. She has written work covering an expanse of architectural conservation practices such as sustainable heritage conservation, modern and industrial heritage, heritage policy and practices in Canada, landscapes, building deterioration, deconstruction and reuse, climate change and cultural heritage management.

=== Chapters in edited books ===
Author(s)	Editor(s)	Title	Journal/ Publishing Entity	Page No.s	Date
Ross, Susan M.	Cameron, C.	Sustainable Heritage-in-Practice: Relationships, Goals, Localization and Models.	Evolving Heritage Conservation Practice in the 21st Century, Creativity, Heritage and the City, vol 5. Springer	113-128	2023
Ross, Susan	Elliott, Bridget & Windover, Michael	Conserving 'Modest' Moderne Housing: 1930s Apartment Buildings in Canada.	The Routledge Companion to Art Deco, London: Routledge	315-337	2019
Ross, Susan	Quinn, Carolyn; Belliveau, Richard & Ross, Susan	Between the Wars, 1919-1939	From Walk Up to High-Rise: Ottawa's Historic Apartment Buildings, Ottawa: Heritage Ottawa	25-26	2017
Ross, Susan	Quinn, Carolyn; Belliveau, Richard & Ross, Susan	The Windsor Arms	From Walk Up to High-Rise: Ottawa's Historic Apartment Buildings, Ottawa: Heritage Ottawa	35-36	2017
Ross, Susan	Vanlaethem, France & Therrien, Marie-Josée	Conserver le bois moderne: des stratégies environnementales pour un patrimoine organique	La sauvegarde de l'architecture moderne, Presses de l'université du Québec	305-323	2014
Ross, Susan	Castonguay, S., & Dagenais, M.	Hidden Water in the Landscape: The Covered Reservoirs of Mount Royal	Metropolitan Natures: Environmental Histories of Montreal, Pittsburgh University Press	115-132.	2012

=== Articles in refereed journals ===
Author(s)	Title	Journal/ Publishing Entity	Page No.s	Date
Aidoo, Fallon Samuels, Daniel Barber, Joseph Siry, Michele Morganti, Susan Ross, Jessica Morris, Francesco Cianfarani, Juliana Yat Shun Kei, Priya Jain, And Kai Woolner-Pratt.	Roundtable Discussion: Retrofitting Research: A Global Conversation on Challenges and Opportunities.	Future Anterior: Journal of Historic Preservation History Theory & Criticism 18, no. 1	117-146	Summer 2021
Ross, Susan M.	Re-evaluating Heritage Waste: Sustaining Material Values through Deconstruction and Reuse.	The Historic Environment: Policy and Practice 11.2	1-27	2020
Ross, Susan and Victoria Angel	Heritage and Waste: Introduction.	Journal of Cultural Heritage Management and Sustainable Development 10.1	1-5	2020
Ross, Susan	Waterworks in a changing climate: the R.C. Harris filtration plant, Toronto, Canada	Proceedings of the Institute of Civil Engineers – Engineering History and Heritage 172.3	125-135	2019
Ross, Susan	Sustainable Conservation Strategies for Canada's Modernist Wood Legacy	Journal of Architectural Conservation 23.3	171-189	2017
Ross, Susan	Enhancing the Conservation Tools for Natural Heritage in Heritage Districts	APT Bulletin 48.2-3	60-67	2016
Ross, Susan	How Green was Canadian Modernism? How Sustainable Will it Be?	Docomomo International Journal, special Canada Modern issue 38	67-73	2008
Ross, Susan and Andrew Powter	Integrating Environmental and Cultural Sustainability in Heritage Properties	Association for Preservation Technology Bulletin 36.4	5-11	2005
Ross, Susan	Steam or Waterpower? Thomas C. Keefer and the Engineers discuss the Montreal Waterworks in 1852	Industrial Archaeology 29.1	49-64	2003
Ross, Susan	Montreal's Grain Elevator no.5, The Uncertain Fate of a Modern Icon	Docomomo International Journal 28	32-24	2003

== Memberships and activism ==
Susan Ross is an active member of multiple heritage organizations. She co-chairs the National Roundtable on Heritage Education, which seeks to understand, strengthen and advance heritage education in Canada. Other organizations range from local to international and include the National Trust for Canada, ICOMOS Canada (The International Council on Monuments and Sites), TICCIH (The International Committee for the Conservation of the Industrial Heritage), Docomomo, Heritage Ottawa, and the Association for Critical Heritage Studies.

Through her work at Carleton University and her publications, Ross advocates for better education, policy, planning, and practices around heritage conservation in Canada and greater awareness of the impact of demolition and the potential for the reuse of materials.
