= Weinmeisterstraße station =

Station of the Berlin U-Bahn

Coordinates: 52.525°N 13.405°E

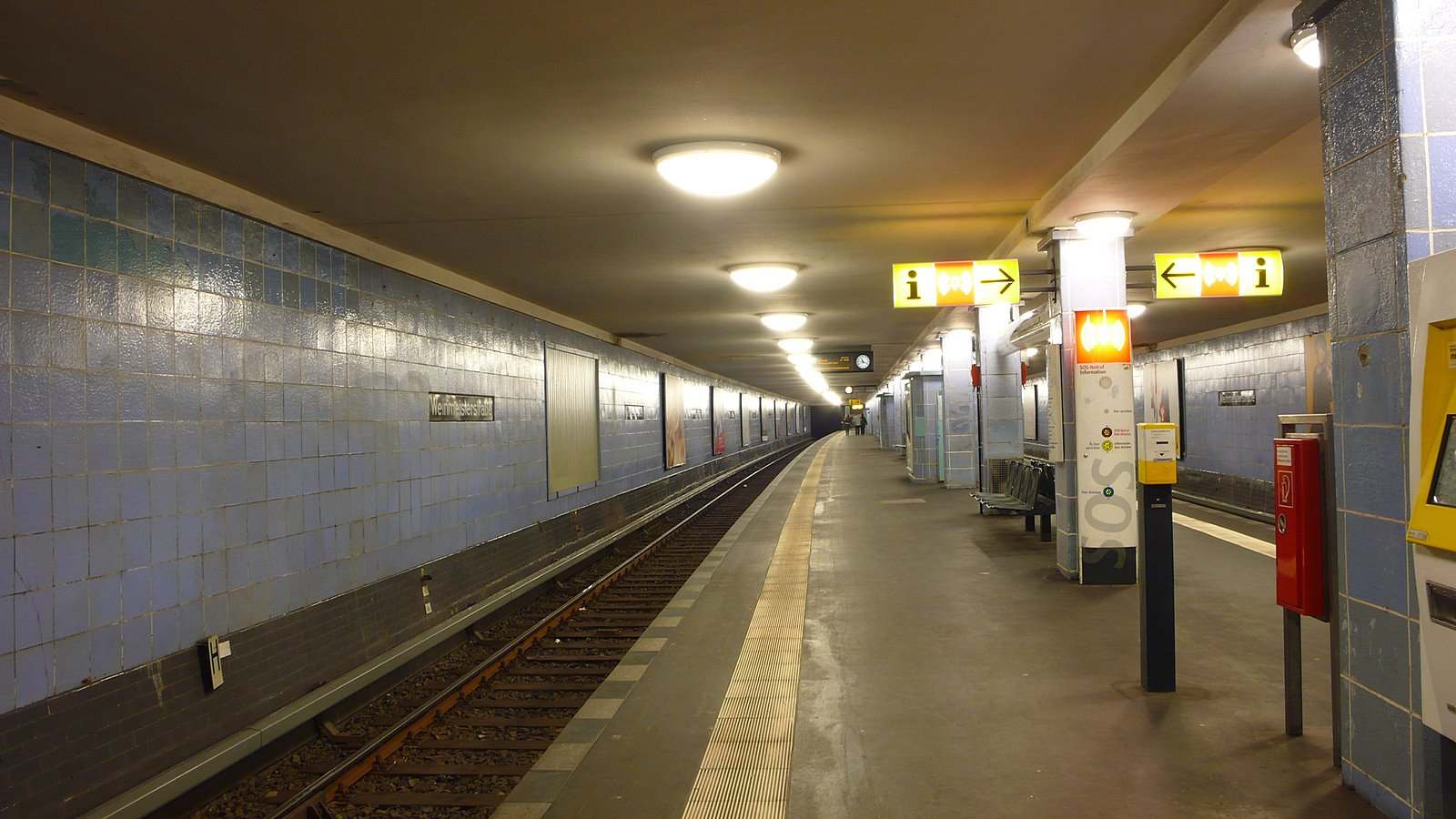
Platform at Weinmeisterstraße

Weinmeisterstraße is a Berlin U-Bahn station located on the U8.

It was built in 1930 (96 years ago) by Alexander Grenander and shortly closed during World War II.

During the Berlin Wall (from 1961) the station was closed by the East German government, later on top of the entrances apartments were built. When it was reopened on 1 July 1990, there were some difficulties to open them again, but so far minor cleanup is needed.

Preceding station	Berlin U-Bahn	Following station
Rosenthaler Platz towards Wittenau	U8	Alexanderplatz towards Hermannstraße
