= Volkspark am Weinberg =

Urban park in Berlin, Germany

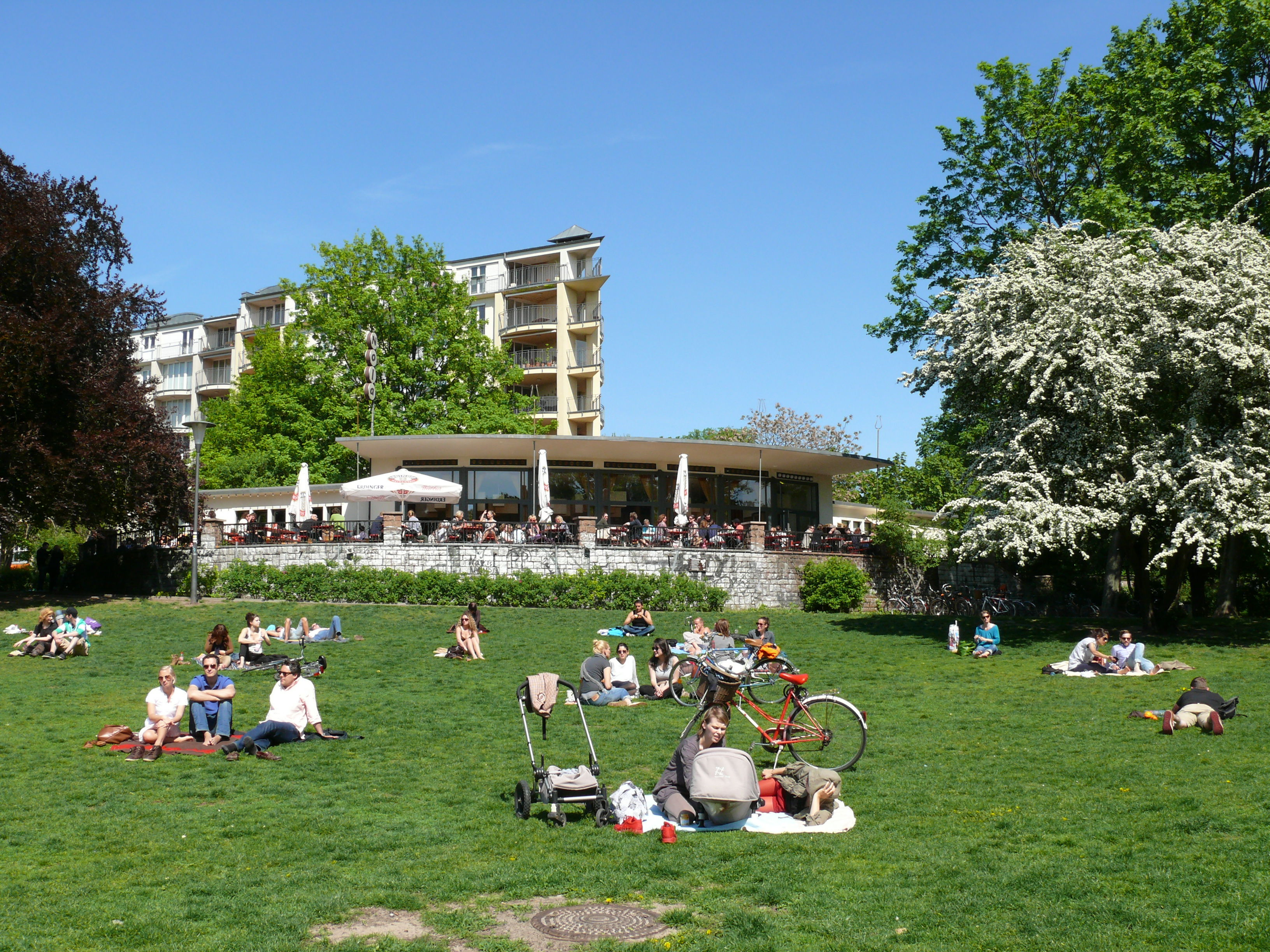
- Café Weinberg, Volkspark

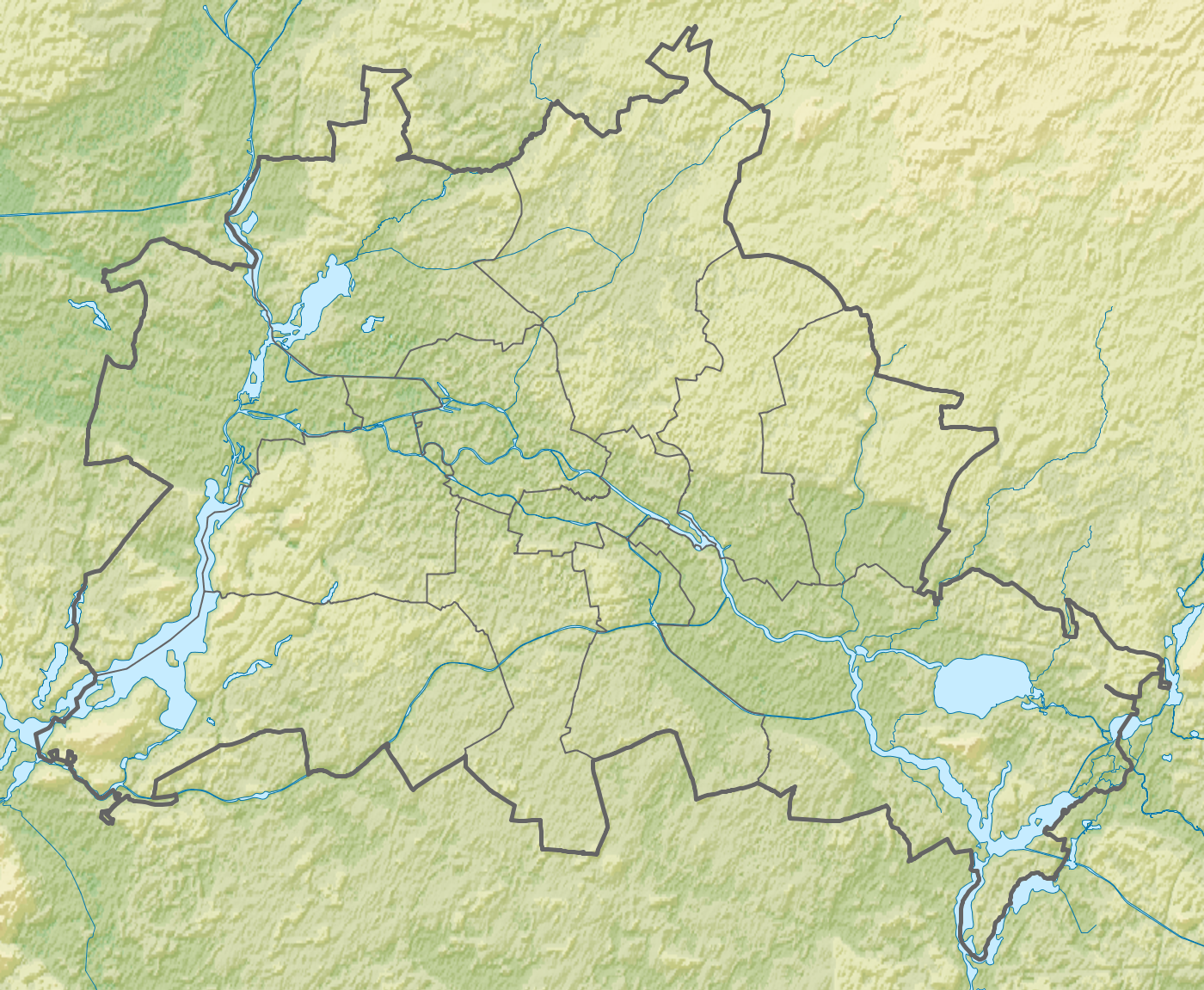
- Location within Central Berlin Location within Berlin
- Type: Urban park
- Location: Mitte, Berlin
- Coordinates: 52°31′56″N 13°24′5″E
- Area: 4.3 hectares (11 acres)
- Created: 1954-1958
- Status: Open all year

The Volkspark am Weinberg (also called Weinbergspark) is the only Volkspark (public park) in Berlin's Mitte locality in the district of the same name and covers an area of 4.3 hectares (11 acres). It is bordered by Weinbergsweg to the southeast, Brunnenstraße to the southwest, Veteranenstraße to the northwest and Fehrbelliner Straße to the northeast. The name Weinberg (vineyard) goes back to the vineyards that formerly occupied the hill on which the park is now situated. Since the late 1970s, the park has been designated as a garden monument (Gartendenkmal).

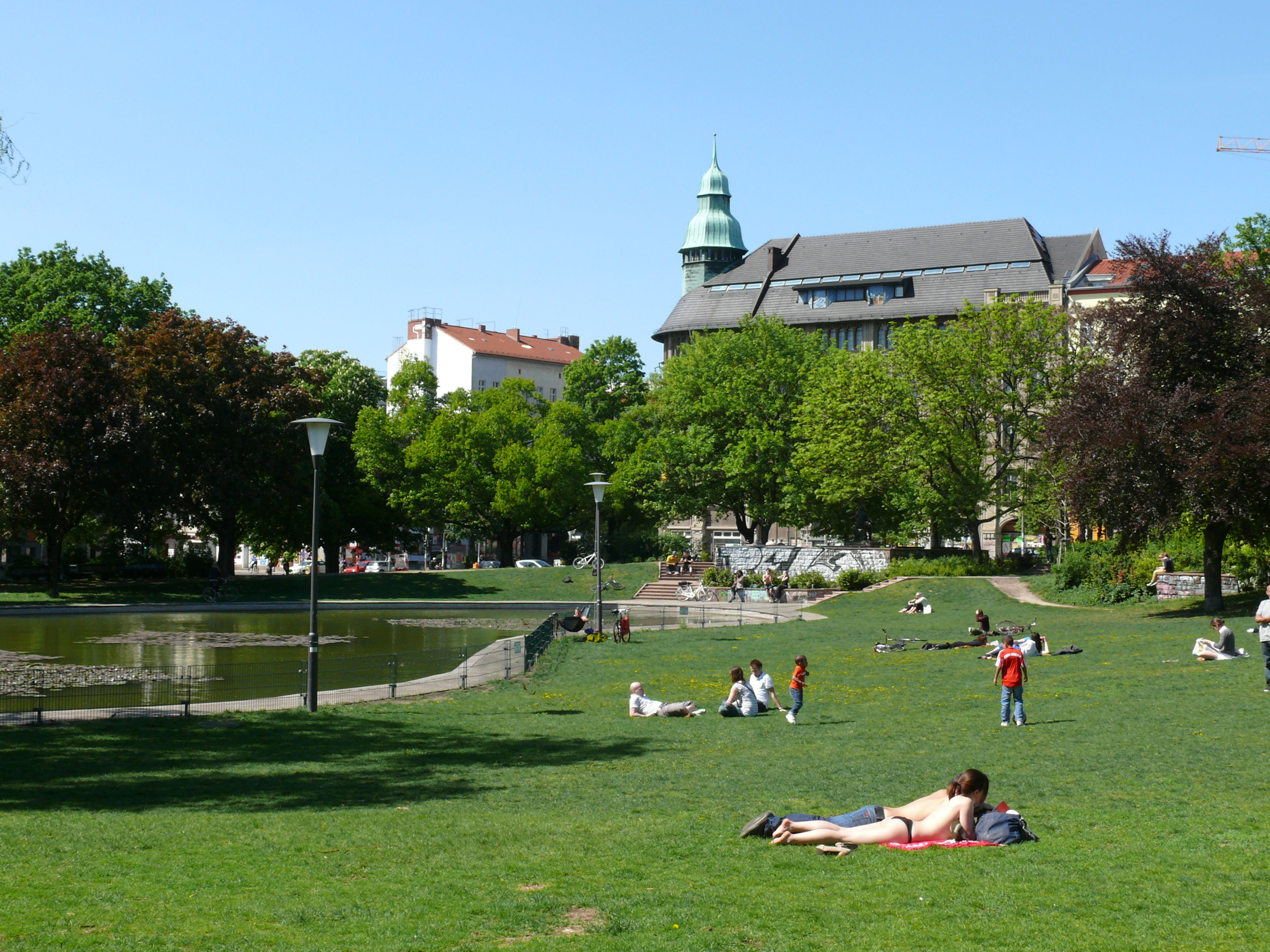
Lawn for sunbathing, 2011

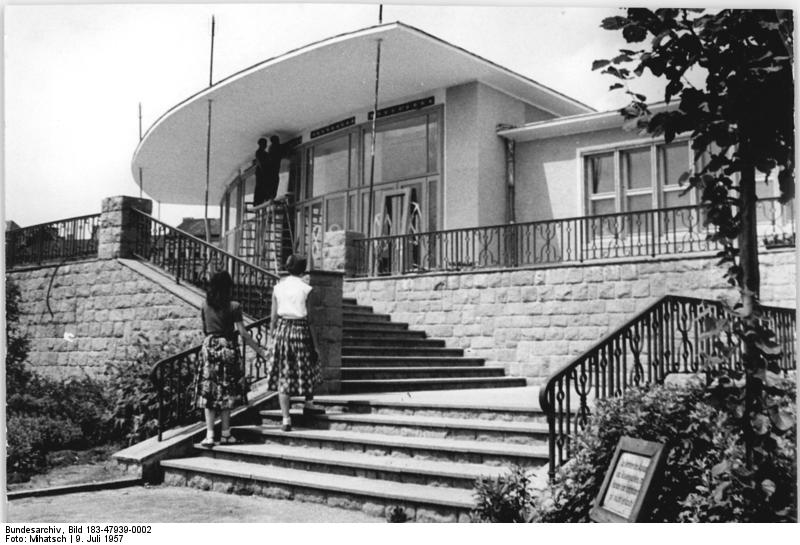
Café, 1957

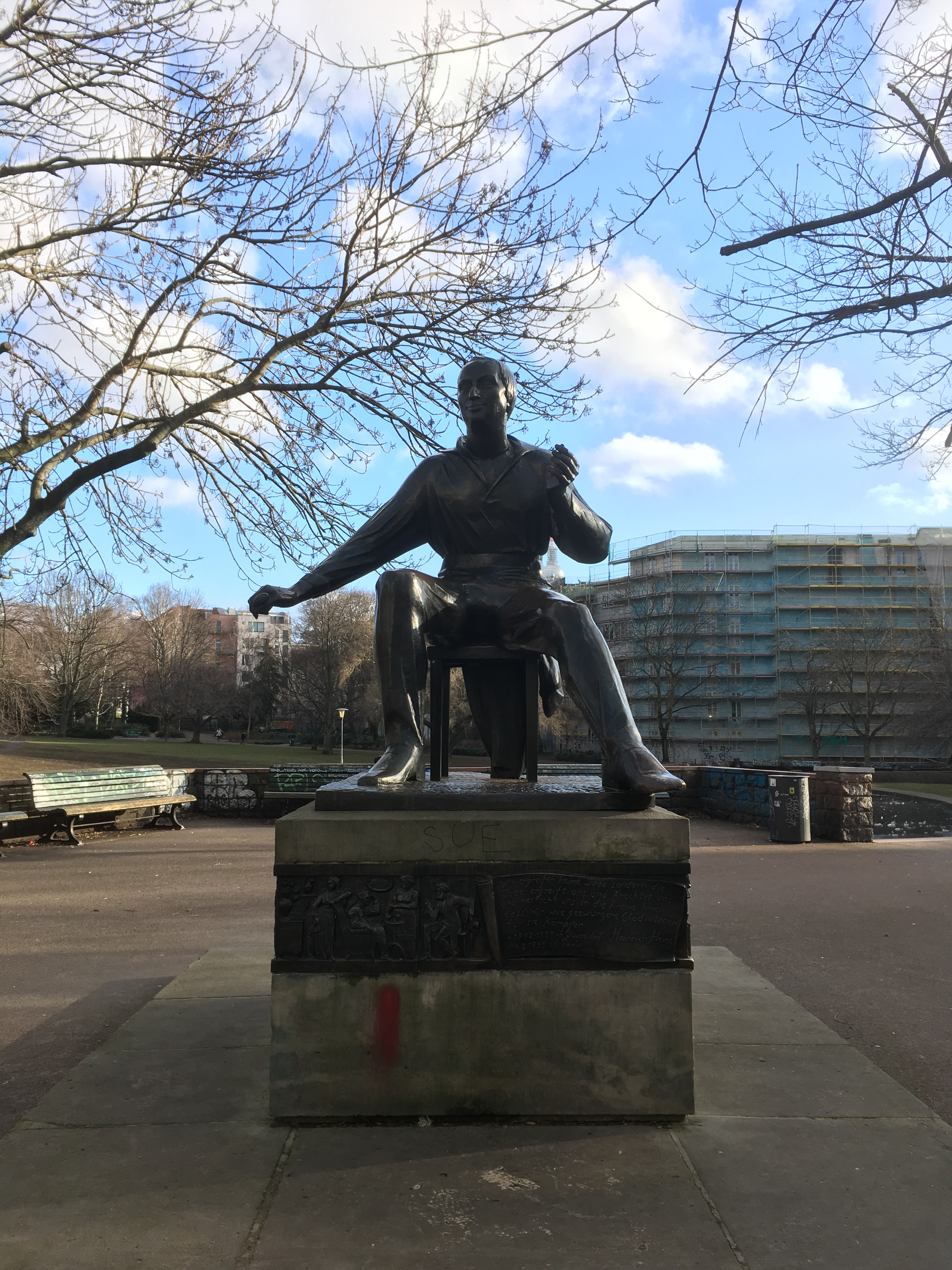
Heinrich Heine statue at the parks entrance

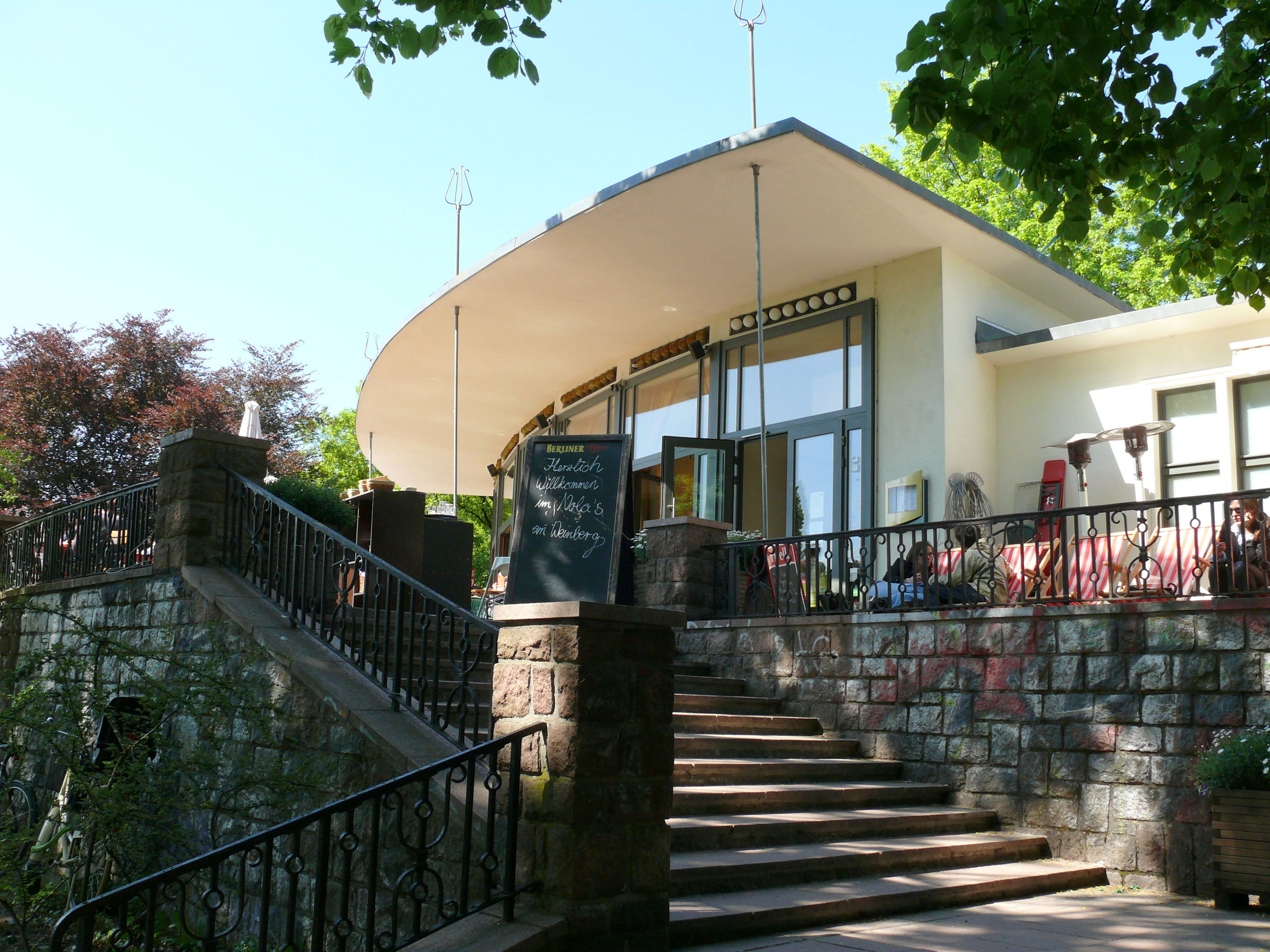
Café, 2011

== History ==
A Gründerzeit (founders' period) development existed on the current park's location since the middle of the 18th century. In the area along the Invaliden- and Brunnenstraße, and from Fehrbelliner Straße up to the level of Zehdenicker Straße, was used as Mullberry plantation and housed the Villa Wollank. Later, the space was used as a garden pub and amusement site.

From 1936, a part of the villa belonging to the park was leased to the city of Berlin and opened to the public. Several theatres opened on either side of the park, including the Walhalla-Theater with Carows Lachbühne. During the Second World War, Allied Air Raids from 1943 onwards destroyed the buildings and developments around the current Weinberg park, with the area being cleared of debris after the war. In 1954-1956, the park was constructed according to the plans of landscape architect Helmut Kruse, who planned a richly structured park with diverse design and utilisation areas taking into account the hillside location.

Between 1957 and 1958, the Café am Weinberg building was constructed on the elevated plateau, offering visitors a panoramic view of the park. The building was designed by Hans Jahrig and Max Kowohl. In the southwestern corner of the park, a kidney-shaped pond was laid out, surrounded by a central lawn for sunbathing. The park occupied a special position in the Berlin green plan of the 1950s, as it is the only park of its size and consistently independent formal form, at a time when the restoration or renewal of war-damaged parks was the city's main focus.

== Description ==
Between the remaining buildings of the Invalidenstrasse and the Weinbergsweg lies a rose garden with a fountain, a playground and a sports facility with a football pitch and table tennis tables, separated by a height offset on the north side.

Other themed gardens, such as the Heidegarten, Schau- und Sichtungsgarten and the Alpinum, designed to introduce Berliners to a wide variety of plant types, are located along the main access paths surrounding the central lawn. In the northwest of the park stands Waldemar Grzimek's 1955 monument to poet Heinrich Heine, which was originally planned to be displayed in Kastanienwäldchen (Unter den Linden) in 1956. However, the sculpture was erected here in this people's park in 1958.

On the base of the statue a quote from Heinrich Heine can be read: "We do not seize an idea but the idea seizes us and enslaves us and whips us into the arena like forced gladiators to fight for it."

== Usage ==
The lawn on the southwest slope is a popular summer sunbathing spot for locals. Below the lawn is an artificial pond, above a Swiss restaurant and café, the rose garden, a playground and a sports complex with a football pitch and table tennis tables, all of which are used intensively.

Although the residential area in the surrounding area is one of the areas with the highest number of children in Berlin, the park has not been adequately maintained for years. Only after residents demanded the repair in neighbourhood talks and by collecting signatures in order to counter the establishment of a drug scene, did the Senate make funds available for this garden monument. Regular checks are carried out in the park through the police station directly adjacent to the park. This and the reports in the tabloid press sparked a debate against a sweeping condemnation of dealers. Soon thereafter, in August 2007, the district council provided funds for the repair and extension of the park’s lighting system.

Since the end of 2005, the Volkspark am Weinberg has been renovated with a budget of around one million euros.

== Suburban Theatre at Weinbergsweg ==
Julie Gräbert (1803–1871), better known as Mutter Gräbert (Mother Gräbert), was in charge of the Suburban Theatre at the Weinbergsweg from 1854 onwards. The theatre quickly became known in the city because of its „primal Berlinism“ (original Berlinism, a reference to its use of Berlin dialect). Here the 'Berliner Posse' found a home next to the established Wallner-Theater.

The Suburban Theatre was ultimately a victim of the Gründerzeit period - after Gräbert's death in 1871, it was demolished in 1873 and Zehdenicker Straße was built in its place. Julie Gräbert was buried in the nearby Elisabeth-Kirchhof cemetery.
