= Rosenthaler Platz station =

Station of the Berlin U-Bahn

Rosenthaler Platz
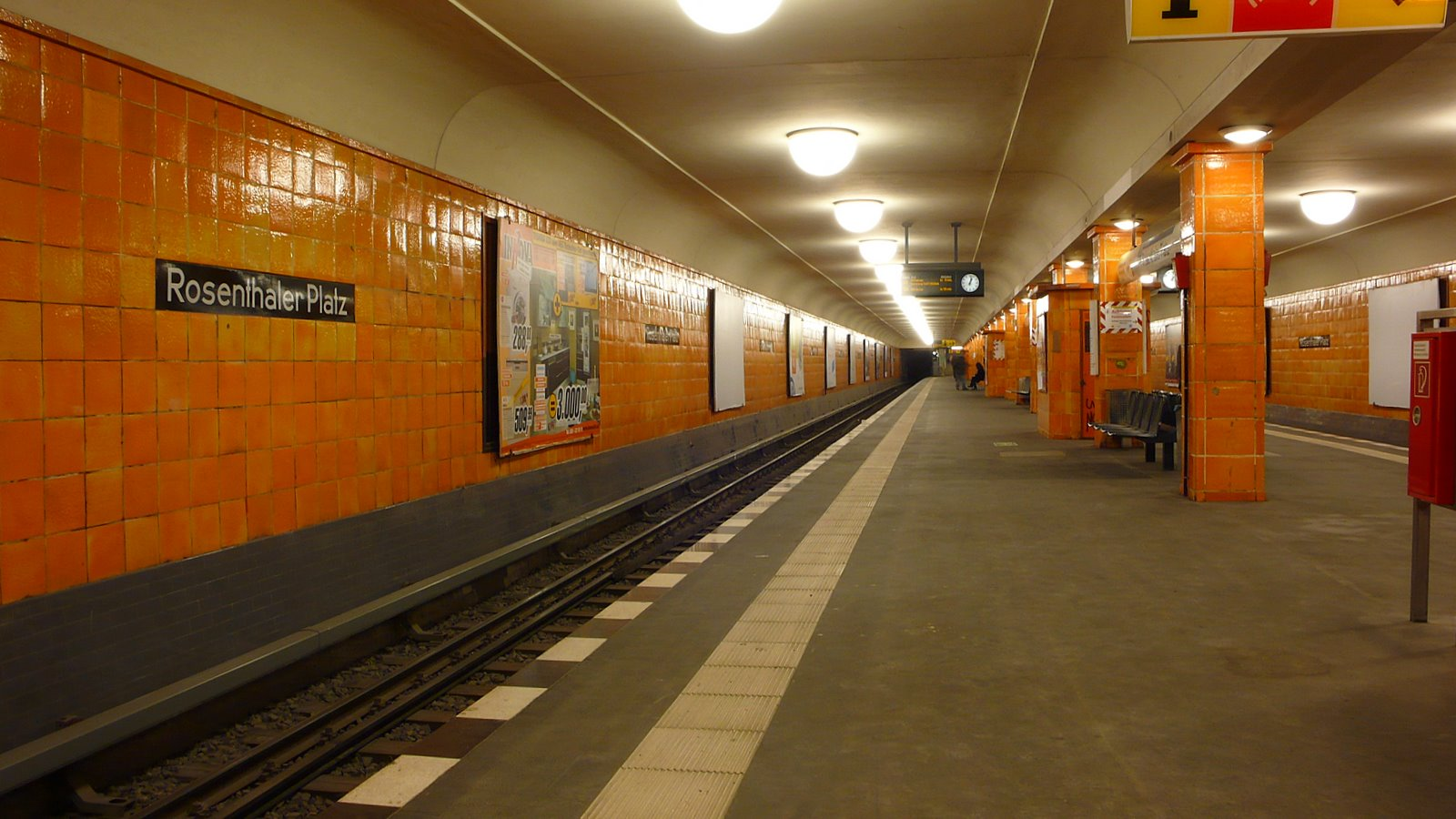
- Platform view

General information
- Location: Rosenthaler Platz; Mitte, Berlin; Germany
- Coordinates: 52.530°N 13.401°E
- Owner: Berliner Verkehrsbetriebe
- Operator: Berliner Verkehrsbetriebe
- Platforms: 1 island platform
- Tracks: 2
- Connections: : 142, N8, N40; : M1, M8

Construction
- Structure type: Underground

Other information
- Fare zone: : Berlin A/5555

History
- Opened: 18 April 1930; 96 years ago

Services
Preceding station	Berlin U-Bahn	Following station
Bernauer Straße towards Wittenau	U8	Weinmeisterstraße towards Hermannstraße
Location

Rosenthaler Platz is a Berlin U-Bahn station located on the U8. Opened on 18 April 1930, the station was designed by Alfred Grenander, making prominent use of orange uranium tiles.

From 1961 to 1989 the station was one of the city's many "ghost stations". The station served as a temporary border crossing after the fall of the Berlin Wall.
