= Rosenthaler Platz =

Square in Berlin, Germany

Coordinates: 52.5296°N 13.4012°E

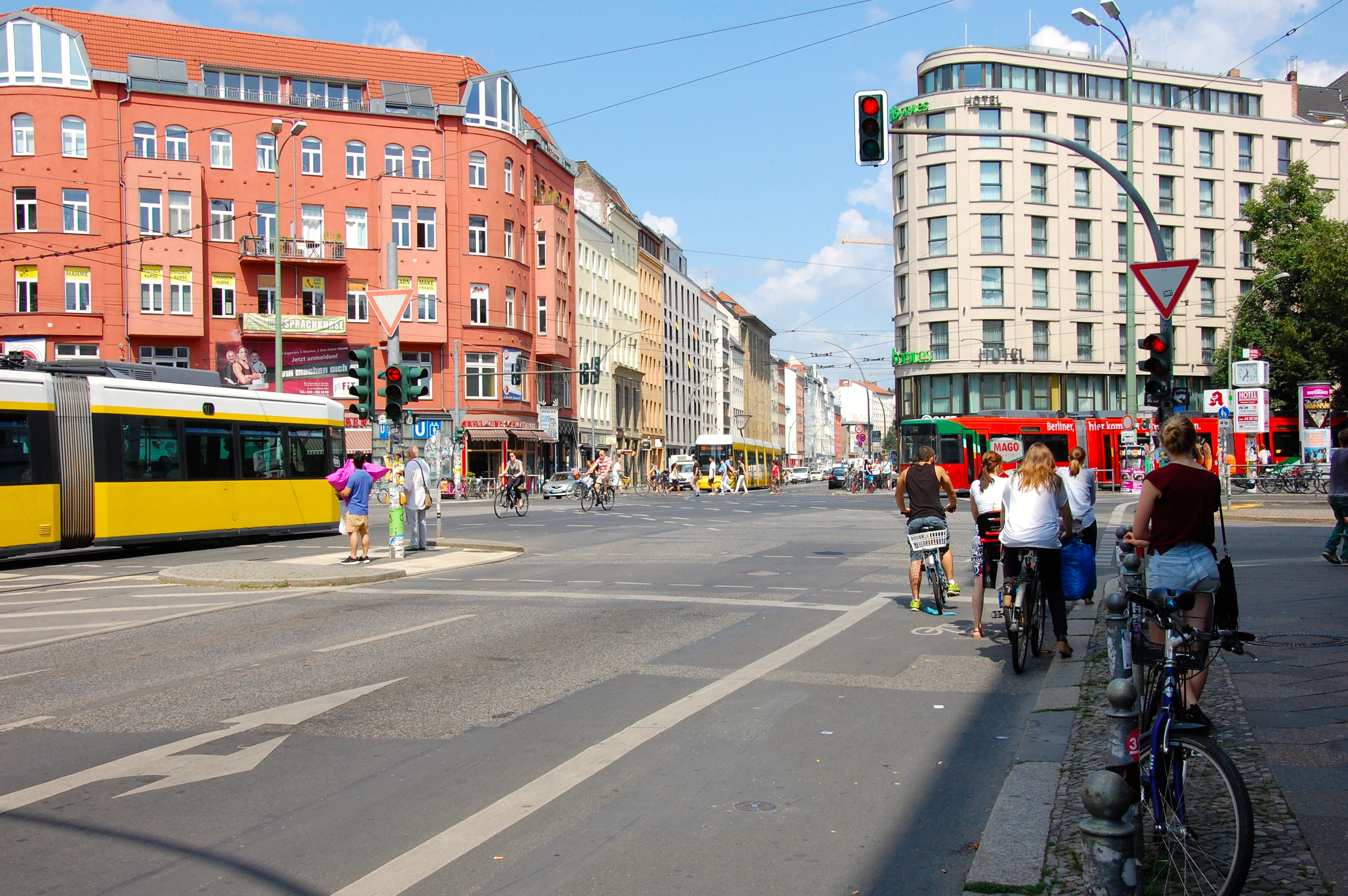

- Location within Central Berlin Location within Berlin
- Location: Mitte, Berlin
- Nearest metro station: Rosenthaler Platz (Berlin U-Bahn)

Rosenthaler Platz in Berlin's Mitte district, district Mitte, forms a crossroads where Rosenthaler Strasse, Brunnenstrasse and Weinbergsweg meet Torstrasse, and is therefore not a square in the true sense of the word. It is located on the site of the former Rosenthaler Tor of the Berlin Customs Wall, from which a road led to the village of Rosenthal. This gate was one of the few through which Jews were allowed to enter Berlin until the 19th century. Those who were not allowed to enter could stay overnight in a special Jewish hostel.

Directly in front of the gate, at the behest of Friedrich II, the Rosenthal suburb was built, a colony in which Saxon guest workers were settled. The Rosenthaler Tor was demolished around 1867 during Berlin's expansion and the demolition of the customs wall.

In Alfred Döblin's novel Berlin Alexanderplatz, published in 1929, Rosenthaler Platz plays the central role in his second book; the construction work on the underground between Alexanderplatz and Rosenthaler Platz is also mentioned in it.

The Rosenthaler Platz underground station was opened on 18 April 1930. When construction of the Berlin Wall began in the night of 13 August 1961, it was closed because the line led to West Berlin on both sides. Shortly after reunification in the GDR, from 22 December 1989 until the summer of 1990, the station functioned as a temporary border crossing.

To the north of Rosenthaler Platz is the Weinbergspark.
