= Julie Gräbert =

German theatre manager

Julie Gräbert (1803–1871), was a German theatre manager.

She succeeded her husband as the manager of the popular theatre Vorstädtische Theater am Weinbergsweg in Berlin between 1855 and 1870, which was known as an innovative establishment during her tenure.

She is the subject of a Singspiel by Curth Flatow, Mutter Gräbert macht Theater.
