= Coahuila State Government Palace =

Building in Saltillo, Mexico

- El Palacio de Gobierno de Coahuila
- Alternative names: Pink Palace (Palacio Rosa)

General information
- Architectural style: Neoclassical
- Location: Plaza de Armas, Saltillo, Mexico, Mexico
- Coordinates: 25.4219°N 101.0010°W
- Year built: 1808-1809
- Owner: Coahuila

The Coahuila State Government Palace (Spanish: El Palacio de Gobierno de Coahuila), also known as Pink Palace (Spanish: Palacio Rosa) is a building located in Saltillo, Mexico. It serves as the state government building of Coahuila and a part of the state's capital. The neoclassical structure holds multiple rooms to accommodate seats for designated executive officials, including the governor. The palace is nicknamed "Pink Palace" due to its exterior pink color from the quarry sandstone. The building sits in the Plaza de Armas central square and right beside the San Esteban de Nueva Tlaxcala (Santa Cruz) fountain. The palace includes three floors and a museum which visitors can enter without fee.

== History ==
During Spain's colonial conquest of North America, Alberto del Canto, would establish a settlement known as the "Villa de Santiago del Saltillo" (and later officially known as Saltillo) in 1577. The city would remain populated with mixed communities from the indigenous and the Spaniards. In the early 1800's, the city would become flourished with agriculture and commercial businesses. Between 1808-1809, the building would undergo construction and would open soon after. The palace was administered for the city mayor of Saltillo. In 1856, a fire broke out on the palace due to an explosion from the barrels of gunpowder stored inside, reducing the structure to rubbles. Reconstruction efforts to restore the original structure of the palace took place between 1862-1885. The palace was transferred and administered to the state government of Coahuila in 1929. The palace added a third floor in 1979 and renovated in 2009, an addition to a museum on the ground floor which opened in the same year.

== Interior ==
=== Halls ===
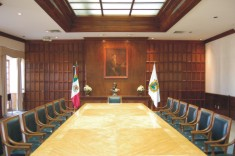
Carranza Room

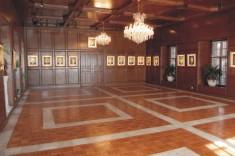
Governor's Hall

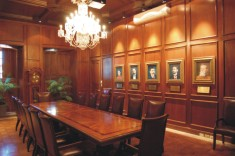
Conference room, adjacent to the President's Hall

In the palace consists of five halls, one of which is the "Carranza Hall". This hall is located on the floor of the palace and serves as a directory towards the governor of Coahuila's executive office. It is also adjacent to the Carranza Room, where cabinet delegates meet. The "Governors Hall "serves as a directory for ceremonies, held by delegates of the Coahuila government. The hall is adorned by a gallery, which holds portraits of important Mexican figures who have been a part of the Coahuilan government. The "President's Hall" is adjacent to the State Governor conference features a gallery with prominent Coahuilan figures who, as presidents, shaped Mexican history.

=== Murals ===
The palace features murals painted by Mexican muralist Salvador Almaraz López, although some sources vary. The murals are separated as altarpieces. They represent the subsequent history of Coahuila and Mexico. These murals are located on each floor of the palace besides the halls.

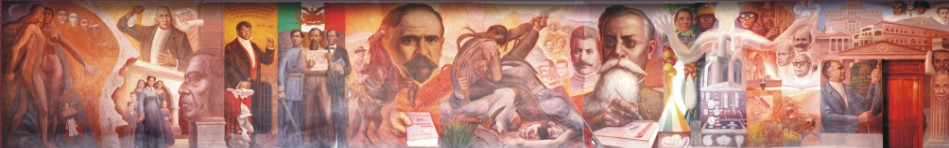
Murals featuring the themes of Mexico and Coahuila

=== Exhibit ===
The exhibition is found on the ground floor of the palace and consists of various artifacts and relics of the history of Coahuila and Mexico. The exhibition includes 9 rooms where these artifacts are held in. The exhibition was planned and constructed in 2007, eventually opening to the public in 2009 after completing it.
