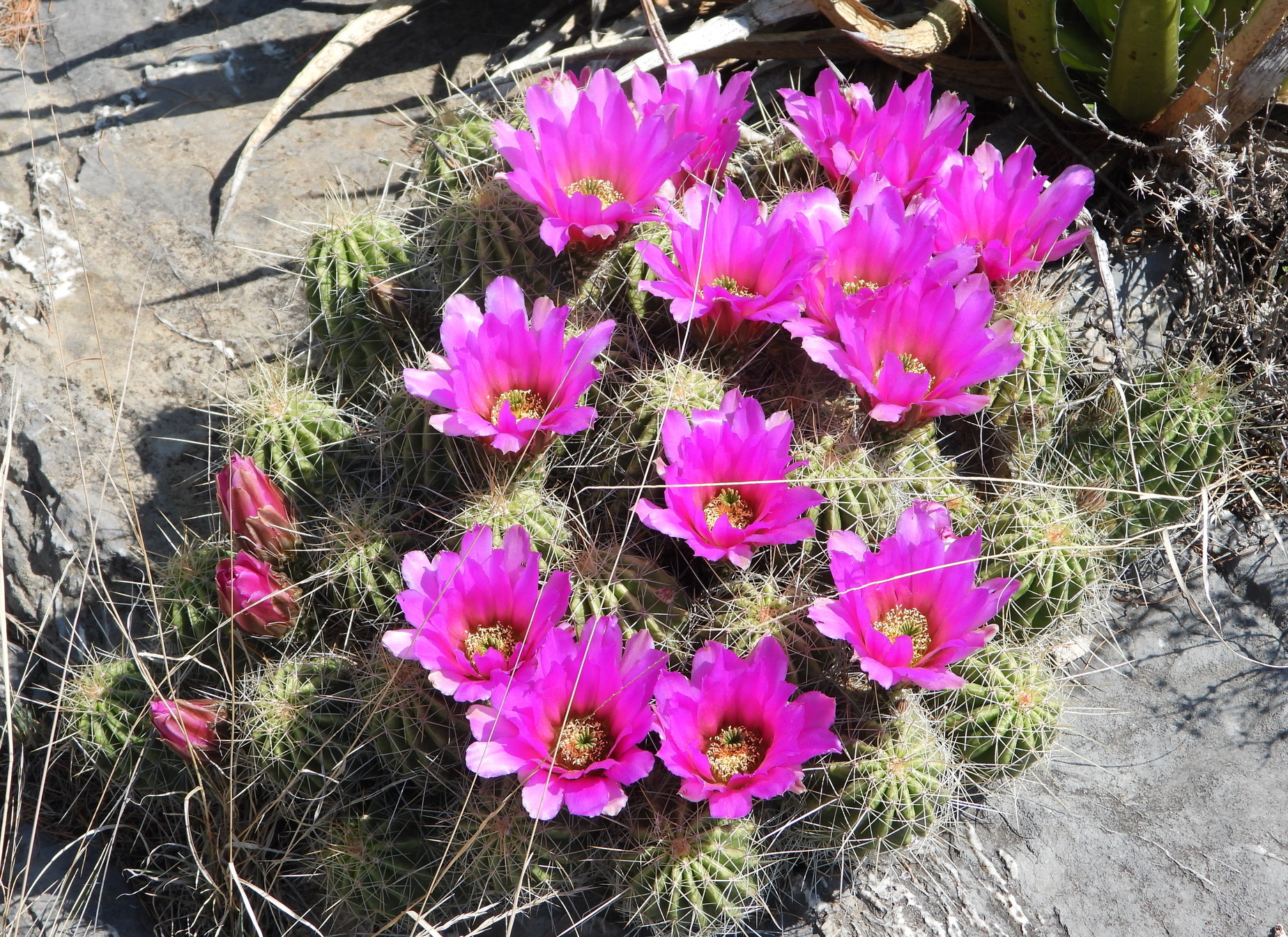

Scientific classification
- Kingdom: Plantae
- Clade: Tracheophytes
- Clade: Angiosperms
- Clade: Eudicots
- Order: Caryophyllales
- Family: Cactaceae
- Subfamily: Cactoideae
- Genus: Echinocereus
- Species: E. zapalinamensis

Binomial name
- Echinocereus zapalinamensis W.Blum & J.Flores Ventura, 2022

= Echinocereus zapalinamensis =

Species of cactus

Echinocereus zapalinamensis is a species of Echinocereus found in Mexico.

== Description ==
Echinocereus zapalinamensis is a cactus that grows in dense cushions of up to 70 stems. It has a low-growing, rounded, and close-to-the-ground appearance, with stems that cluster densely together. The stems are upright, spherical or short cylindrical in shape, reaching up to 30 cm (12 in) in height and 6 to 8 cm (2.4 to 3.1 in) in diameter. They have light green epidermis, and the root system is fibrous and easily branched. The plant features 14 to 17 slightly irregular ribs, each 0.5 to 1 cm (0.20 to 0.39 in) high and spaced 1 to 2.5 cm (0.39 to 0.98 in) apart. Areoles are rounded, up to 4 mm (0.16 in) across, located along the ribs, and separated by 1.2 to 1.8 cm (0.47 to 0.71 in). From each areole, 7 to 11 radial spines emerge; these spines are 1.5 to 3.5 cm (0.59 to 1.38 in) long, white to gray in color, tightly packed, straight, and rigid. Additionally, there are 1 to 3 central spines (rarely up to 4), measuring 2.5 to 5 cm (0.98 to 1.97 in) long (occasionally up to 7.5 cm (3.0 in)). These central spines are yellow to brown, straight, prominent, and covered with fine hair-like trichomes.

The buds of the plant are pointed, initially green and later turning pink, with spines on their surface. The flowers are funnel-shaped, measuring 5 to 7 cm (2.0 to 2.8 in) in length and 7 to 9 cm (2.8 to 3.5 in) across. They have a purplish-pink color with a reddish-purple throat. The floral tube is 1.3 to 1.8 cm (0.51 to 0.71 in) long and 1.2 to 3.5 cm (0.47 to 1.38 in) in diameter, displaying green to brownish-green hues. The ovary is green, 1 to 1.3 cm (0.39 to 0.51 in) long and wide, with 3 to 8 white spines up to 1.5 cm (0.59 in) long, accompanied by white woolly hairs about 1.5 mm (0.059 in) long. The surface of the spines bears fine trichomes. Petals are 3.5 to 4.5 cm (1.4 to 1.8 in) long and 0.8 to 1.2 cm (0.31 to 0.47 in) wide. The nectary chamber is approximately 5 mm (0.20 in) long and 3 to 4 mm (0.12 to 0.16 in) wide. The stamens are pink with greenish tips, 1.5 to 2.5 cm (0.59 to 0.98 in) long, with yellow anthers and pollen. The style measures 3 to 3.5 cm (1.2 to 1.4 in) long and about 3 mm (0.12 in) thick, with a paler green hue toward the tip. The stigma has 6 to 7 lobes, each up to 5 mm (0.20 in) long, and is green to dark green in color.

Fruits develop about four to five months after flowering. They are rounded, measuring 3.2 to 3.6 cm (1.3 to 1.4 in) in both length and diameter, and change color from light green to orange or reddish-orange as they ripen. The pulp inside is white and translucent. When ripe, the fruit opens along a single seam. Seeds are small, measuring 1.4 to 1.6 mm (0.055 to 0.063 in) long and 0.9 to 1.1 mm (0.035 to 0.043 in) wide. They are black, with a pitted surface featuring convex to conical warts, covered by a thin layer.

Echinocereus zapalinamensis is a diploid species with a chromosome number of 2n = 22.

This species is similar to Echinocereus stramineus but differs by more ribs, fewer spines, larger seeds, white pulp in the fruit instead of pink, and a later flowering time.

== Distribution ==
This species is native to northeastern Mexico, specifically the Serranía de Zapalinamé in Coahuila. It thrives in seasonally dry tropical environments, typically between 1700 and 2550 meters elevation. Its habitat includes calcareous soils in transitional areas between valleys and desert or semi-desert plateaus, as well as pine forests and mountain woodlands that receive more rainfall.

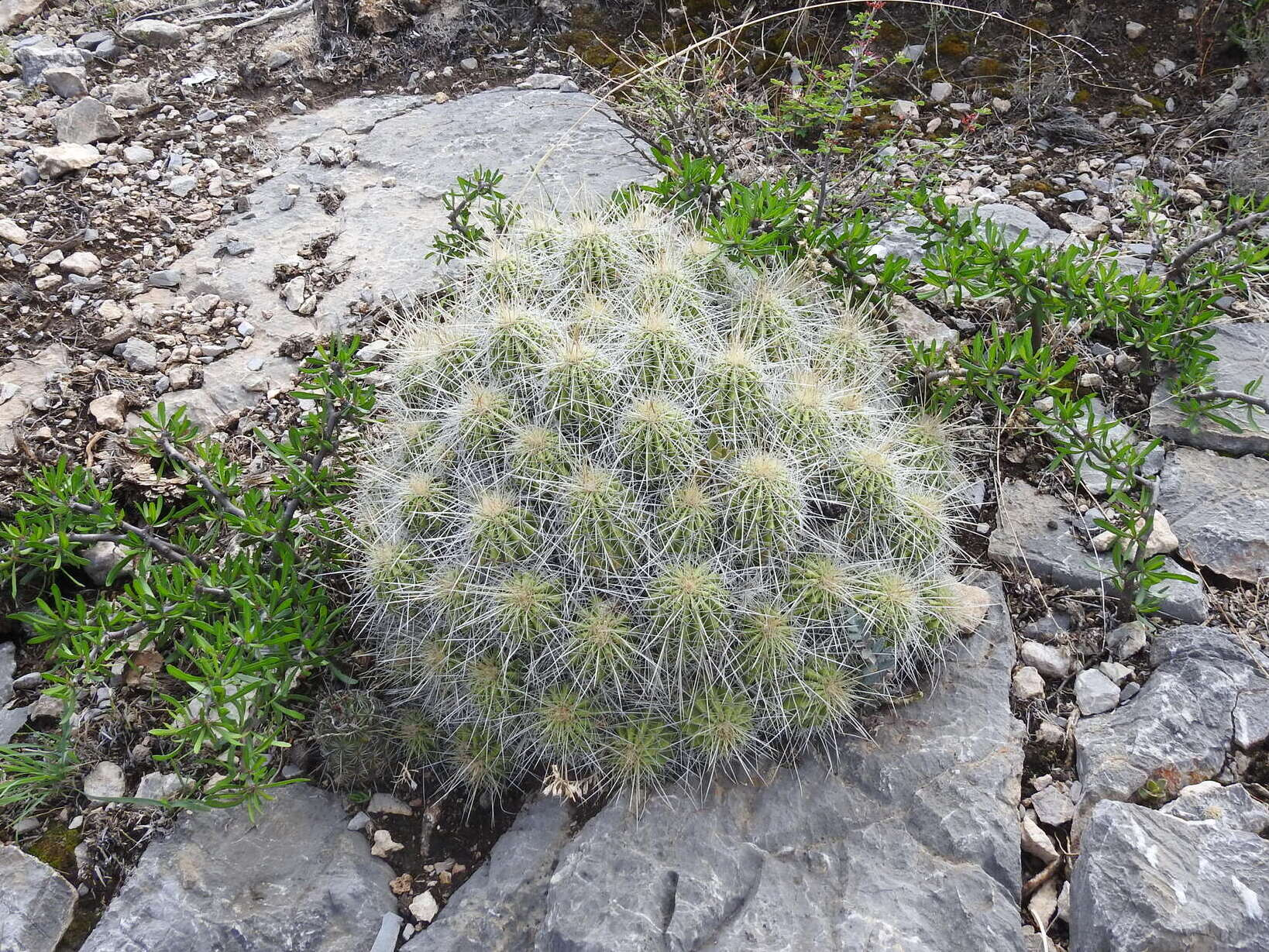
Plant growing in habitat near Saltillo, Coahuila, Mexico

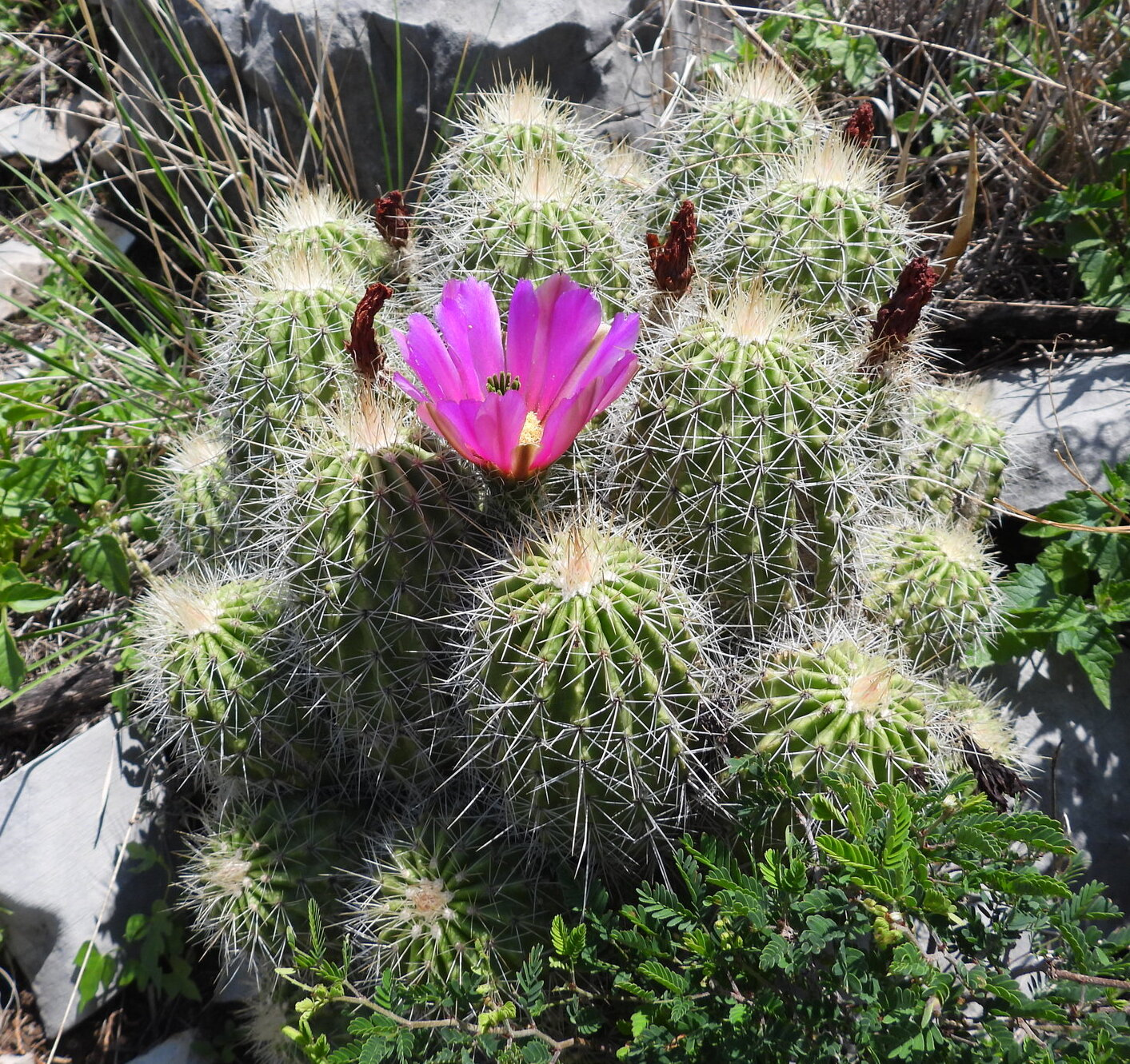
Plant blooming in habitat

== Taxonomy ==
Botanists Wolfgang Blum and J. Flores Ventura described Echinocereus zapalinamensis in 2022. The species was first published in the scientific journal Echinocereenfreund (Special Publication 35: 342). It is named for the Sierra de Zapalinamé in Coahuila, Mexico, where it was discovered.
