= Zapalinamé =

Huachichil tribal leader

Zapalinamé was the leader of the Huachichil tribe that along with other leaders such as Maquisaco, Maquemachichihuac and Cilavan fought against the Spanish invasion in the 16th century in what now is the metropolitan area of Saltillo, Mexico. The Sierra de Zapalinamé was named after him.

== See also ==
- Serranía de Zapalinamé
