= Saltillo tile =

Mexican tile design

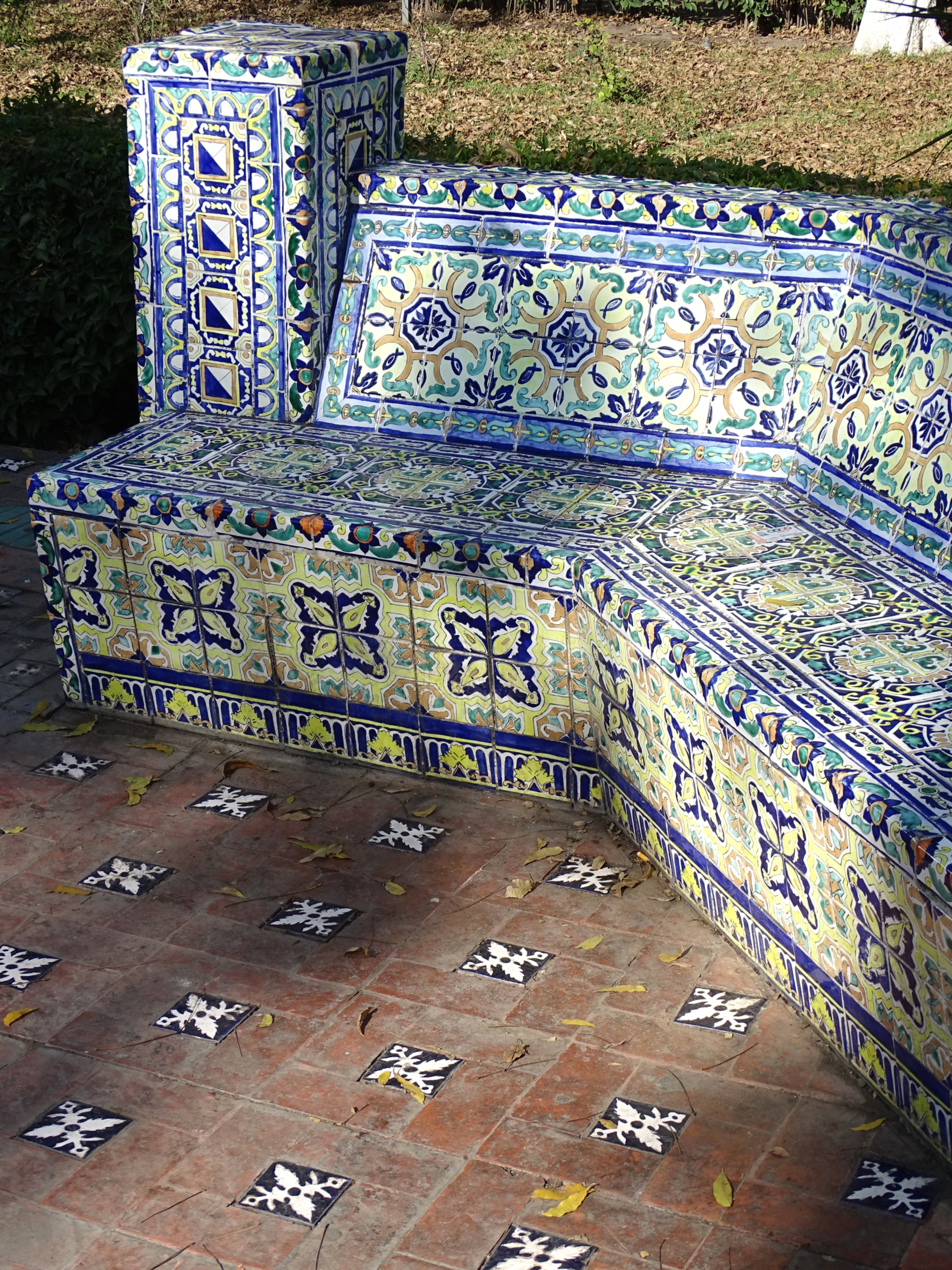
Saltillo tile in the historic city center of Saltillo

Saltillo tile is a type of terracotta tile that originates in Saltillo, Coahuila, Mexico. It is one of the two most famous products of the city, the other being multicolored woven sarapes typical of the region. Saltillo-type tiles have since been manufactured at many places in Mexico, and high-fire "Saltillo look" tiles, many from Italy, compete with the terracotta originals.

== Description ==
Saltillo tiles vary in color and shape, but the majority of Traditional Saltillo tiles range in varying hues of reds, oranges, and yellows. Manganese Saltillo tile has light and dark brown colors with some terracotta tones. Antique Saltillo tile is a hand-textured finished with deep terracotta tones of color. With its textured surface, Antique Saltillo tile is ideal for areas that need a non-slip surface. Spanish Mission Red Saltillo tile is similar to Traditional Saltillo tile, except it doesn't have as many of the light cream and golden colors.

Saltillo tile flooring can be found in many shapes and sizes. Tiles are shaped either by pressing quarried clay with a wooden frame (super), or carving out the desired shape (regular). Depending on the raw tile's placement among other tiles at the time of firing, its color ranges from yellow to a rich orange.

Rustic characteristics found in handmade Saltillo tile include bumps, chips, lime pops, color striping, color variations, size variations, thickness variations, concave back, fingerprints, irregular markings and smudges. These rustic characteristics lend to the appeal of rustic style flooring.

== Installation and sealing ==
Saltillo tile is highly porous, and soaks in liquid easily. Unlike most ceramic tile, there is no glaze on the top surface of the tile. It is difficult to install as it absorbs water from the thin-set mortar, grout, grease pencils, etc. Once placed, it stains and scuffs easily if not properly sealed and maintained with a quality sealant. Saltillo is a poor choice for outdoor installation in freeze-thaw climates, although a popular choice in warmer climates. During installation, the tiles should be handled carefully to avoid stains that can even occur from body oils on the installer's hands. To avoid stain issues, consider sourcing presealed Saltillo tile vs. raw clay tile. The process of installing presealed tiles is simpler and less costly for the overall project.

Preferred methods for installation invariably relate to its propensity for soaking in liquid. One method involves soaking the tile in water, setting the tile with thin-set mortar, grouting, then sealing both the Saltillo and the grout with a quality surface sealant. However, using this method may cause the grout to stick to the surface of the Saltillo tile, making it impossible to remove. This method is not recommended for do-it-yourselfers.

A penetrating sealant will maintain the natural look of the tile. You should periodically test the seal by putting a few drops of water on the tile in various places. If the water is absorbed, then another coat of sealant should be applied.

Other surface sealants may give the tile a shiny appearance. As the tile loses its shine, another coat is applied on top of the old sealant. If the finish becomes too worn or uneven, it can be stripped and a new coat applied. However, this option is very labor-intensive.

Additionally, another coat of sealant can be used on both the Saltillo tile and grout. A professional with experience in Saltillo will charge $2.50 to $6.00 per square foot for installation, depending on your locale.

Treatments for Saltillo include: coating them with a surface sealant prior to grouting (as mentioned earlier), applying an admixture of linseed oil and paint thinner, applying natural stone color enhancers, applying floor hardeners, applying shine, painting them with a water-based paint, coating them with wood stain, etc. As the tile is incredibly porous it will readily absorb just about any liquid. Please note any of these treatments may be used on the tile, however, some of them such as penetrating sealant, enhancers or linseed oil treatments penetrate into the tile and may affect the ability of later coatings to adhere to the tile. Ultra-durable, water-based polyurethane makes an excellent coating for adding slip resistance, beautiful appearance, and protection from penetrating stains. Look for a polyurethane coating that has no VOCs for maximum environmental friendliness.

Saltillo tile may be sealed with a penetrating sealant or a film forming sealant (coating). A film forming sealant will leave a film on the surface of the tile. With multiple coats, the film will build an even protective film and gloss that may repel water, oil, grease, and efflorescence. A quality acrylic sealant should be used as it will be easy to apply, non-yellowing and long-lasting. A quality acrylic floor polish can be applied over the sealed surface for added abrasion and wear protection.

The finished sealed floor should be maintained for best results. For routine cleaning use a neutral cleaner to damp mop the floor (never flood the sealed floor with water). Reapply the polish if areas begin to show wear over time. Maintaining the sealant/polish will greatly extend the life of the sealant and minimize repair needs.
