= Karla Wheelock =

Mexican mountaineer, writer and lawyer

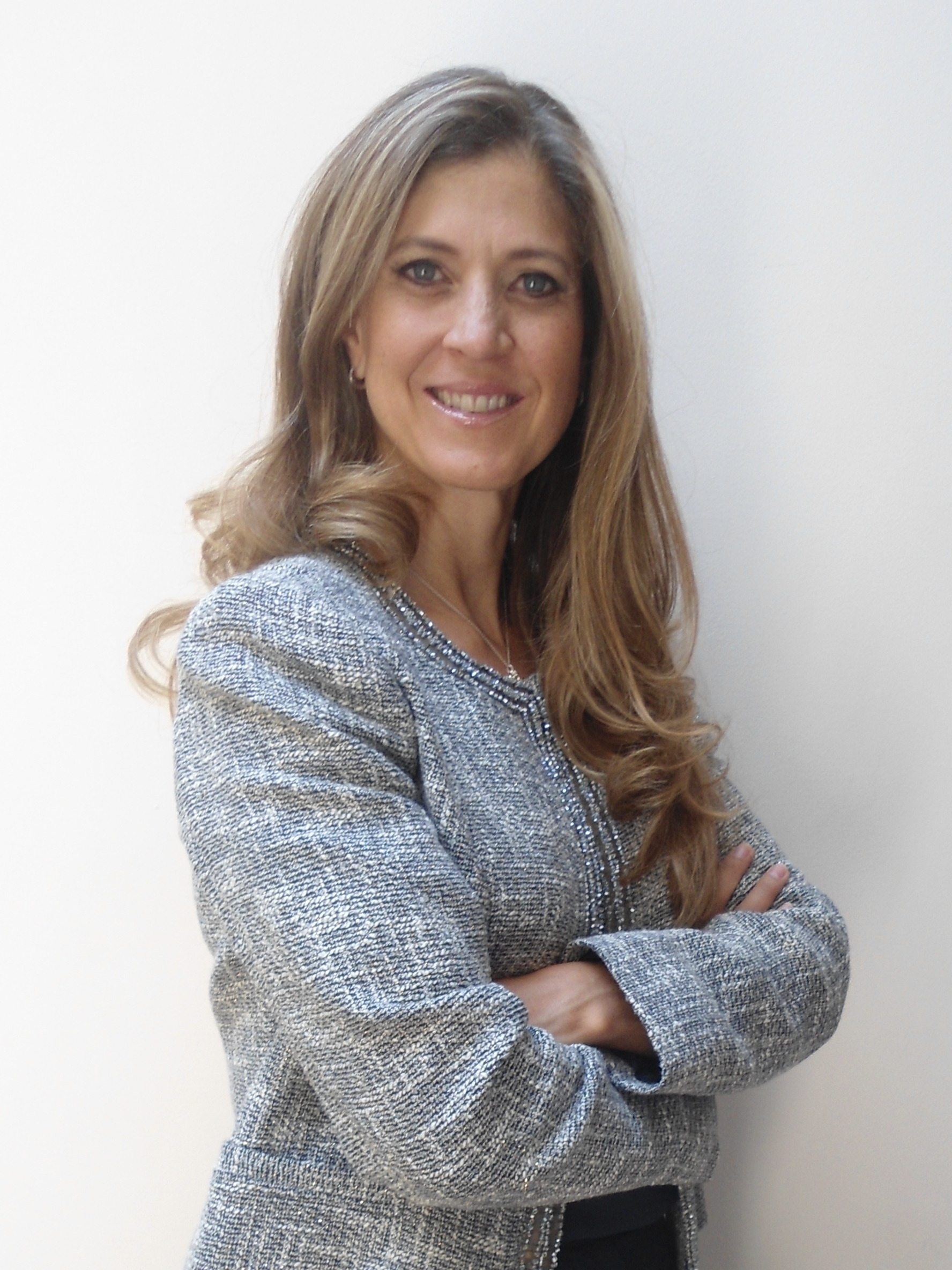

Personal information
- Full name: Karla Susana Wheelock Aguayo
- Nationality: Mexican
- Born: 14 April 1968 (age 58) Saltillo, Coahuila
- Parents: James Wheelcock (father); María del Carmen Aguayo (mother)
- Website: www.karlawheelock.com

Climbing career
- Major ascents: The Seven Summits

Karla Susana Wheelock Aguayo (born 14 April 1968) is a Mexican mountaineer, writer, and lecturer. Shortly after Elsa Ávila became the first Latin American woman to ascend Mount Everest on 5 May 1999, Wheelock ascended Everest by the same route. She is the first Iberoamerican woman to climb the Seven Summits, achieving this in 2005. She holds a degree in Law from the Faculty of Law of the Autonomous University of Coahuila, an institution from which she graduated from with Honorable Mention, and worked for the government of Carlos Salinas de Gortari and the Secretary of Commerce and Industrial Development.

== Biography ==
Karla Wheelock was born to James Wheelock and María del Carmen Aguayo on 14 April 1968 in Saltillo, capital of Coahuila. At age six, she joined a Mexican scouting group and there developed a love for nature and mountains in particular. Wheelock began her mountaineering career in 1989 with the ascent of Popocatépetl, Iztaccihuatl, and the Pico de Orizaba, all in the same year. In 1993, she began her journey on the Seven Summits, climbing Aconcagua, the highest peak both in South America and outside of Asia. She would be nominated for the Mexican National Sports Award in 1999 and 2000. In 2005, Wheelock became the first Iberoamerican woman to climb all Seven Summits.

=== Activism and philanthropy ===
In her interviews and conferences, Wheelock has spoken extensively on issues of education, teamwork, leadership, personal improvement, motherhood, and the situation of women in Mexico.
