= Centro de Convenciones Arena Saltillo =

Arena in Saltilo, Coahuila

Coordinates: 25.4424°N 100.9308°W

Centro de Convenciones Arena Saltillo, popularly shortened to Arena Saltillo, is a 6,000-seat indoor arena and convention center located in Saltillo, Coahuila. Unlike most indoor arenas, the Arena does have any permanent seating; portable stands can be used in the arena for sporting events including basketball, boxing, lucha libre and ice hockey, as well as concerts, ice shows and circuses. Arena Saltillo can accommodate up to 10,000 standing for general admission or festival concerts.

The arena stands 12 meters (39 feet) tall and features 4,000 square meters [43,000 square feet] of indoor space plus a similarly-sized promenade, allowing it to be used for trade shows, conventions and other events. Concession facilities can be found at the promenade and inside the main arena. A 600-square-meter (6,500-square-foot) VIP area is located inside the arena. Restrooms can be found at the VIP area and inside the arena itself.

Arena Saltillo is a popular stop for tours by such artists as Los Tigres del Norte, Alejandra Guzman, Mana, Lorena Herrera, Lupita D'Alessio, Patricia Navidad, Maribel Guardia, Luis Miguel, and Intocable, among other acts.
