= Saltillo Institute of Technology =

Coordinates: 25.4433°N 100.9939°W

- Instituto Tecnológico de Saltillo
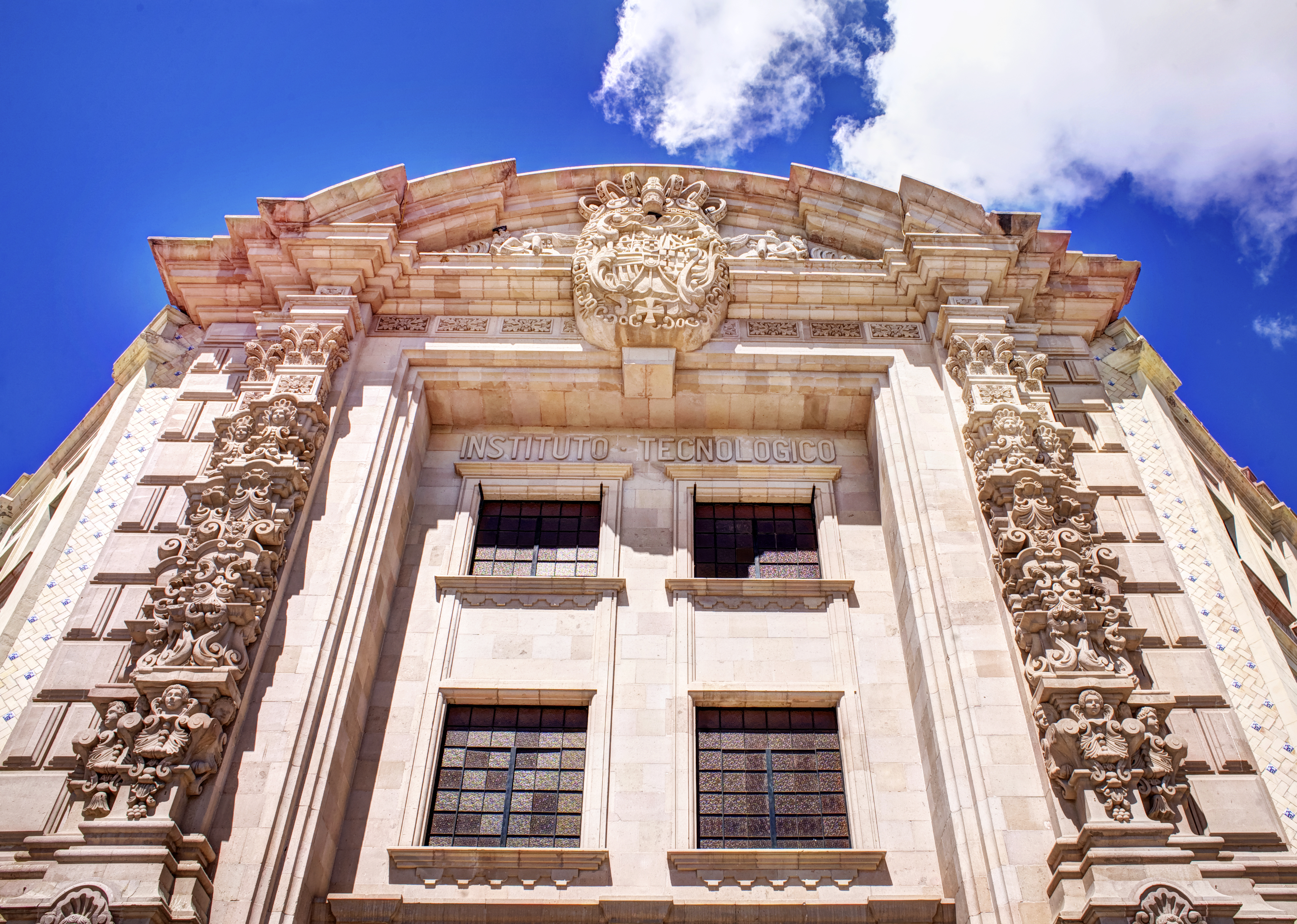
- Motto: La técnica por la grandeza de México (Technique for the greatness of Mexico)
- Type: Public
- Established: 1951
- President: Ania Guadalupe Sánchez Ruiz
- Administrative staff: 258
- Students: 7,825 (2020)
- Location: Saltillo, Coahuila, Mexico
- Campus: Urban
- Website: www.saltillo.tecnm.mx

The Saltillo Institute of Technology (Spanish: Instituto Tecnológico de Saltillo), or ITS, is located in the city of Saltillo, state capital of Coahuila, Mexico. It is a college level technological institution. Founded in July 1950 by Mexican President Miguel Alemán Valdez, it started operations on January 3, 1951.

== History ==
The Saltillo Institute of Technology was founded by presidential decree in July 1950 and began academic operations on 3 January 1951 as one of Mexico’s early regional technological institutes. During its institutional development the school changed designations to reflect an expanding scope and regional role: initially named Instituto Tecnológico de Coahuila, it was redesignated Instituto Tecnológico Regional de Coahuila in 1968, became Instituto Tecnológico Regional de Saltillo in 1977, and adopted the current name Instituto Tecnológico de Saltillo in 1981 as part of the campus’ consolidation of higher‑education programs.

In 1951, the objective of the institution was to provide students technical degrees suitable for the industry; however, due to expansion, it later offered high school, engineering and graduate degrees. By 1951, enrollment consisted of barely 314 students, by 2006, it had grown to 7,016 students: (6,963 at the undergraduate level and 53 at the postgraduate level) in addition to the school staff (4 directors, 23 department heads, 424 professors, 16 researchers, 357 administrative staff and 74 service staff).

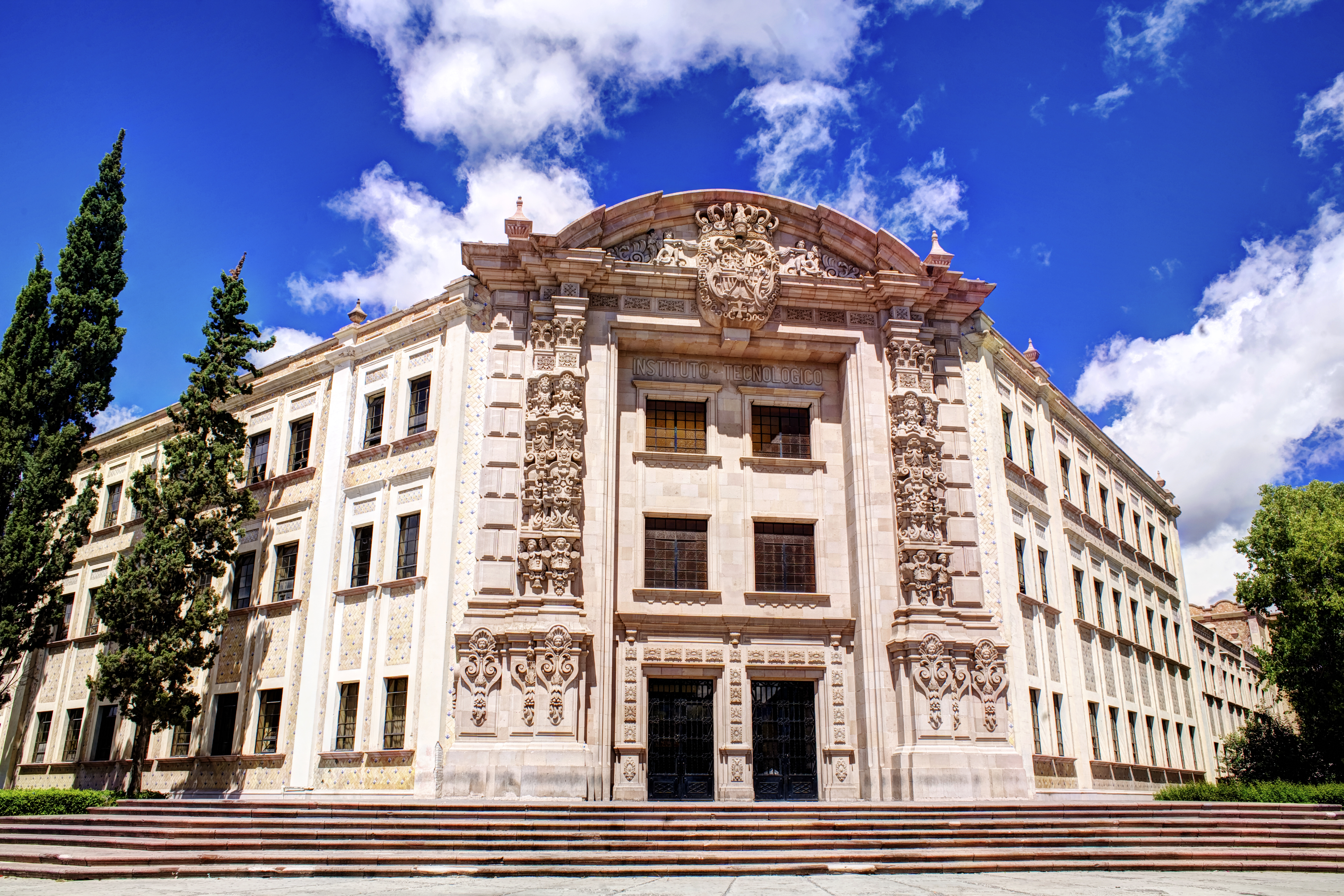
Main building

== Campus and facilities ==
The main building began construction in 1945 in Neocolonial style, designed by Eng. Zeferino Domínguez Villarreal. It is a large building of carved pink quarry stone with arcades, ribbed clay roof tiles and a restrained use of glazed tiles. Its main façade is a monumental-scale reproduction of the façade of the second seat of the Real y Pontificia Universidad de México, the first university on the continent. The use of the façade of the first university on the continent as inspiration is explained by the fact that the original concept for the building was to house the Autonomous University of Coahuila, as shown by Ing. Domínguez’s plans preserved in the map library of the Municipal Archive of Saltillo.

However, following observations by educational authorities and proposals from the business sector, it was decided to refocus this educational project given the urgent need to train human resources with a technological orientation, so the idea of prioritizing the creation of the Instituto Tecnológico de Coahuila at this site was consolidated, and for this new institution to begin its functions immediately due to the urgent need and shortage of technicians who were highly demanded by the region’s industrial and productive sector, adopting for this purpose the model of the Instituto Politécnico Nacional.

The cornerstone was laid in 1945, it was officially inaugurated in July 1950, and it was necessary to wait until 3 January 1951 for academic activities to officially begin.

Located on an area of seven hectares, it originally consisted only of the main building and eight additional spaces intended for workshops in Foundry, Internal Combustion, Carpentry, Welding, Fitting, Machine Tools, Electricity and Construction.

To adequately serve this student population, the technological institute has a human resources complement made up of 16 administrators, 177 teaching staff, 14 researchers, 134 technical assistants, 172 administrative employees and 76 service staff.

Additionally, for the development of its activities, it has physical facilities composed of 63 classrooms, 2 workshops, 4 light laboratories, 4 heavy laboratories, a language laboratory, an information center, a computer center, laboratories for each specialty or degree program, an administrative building, an auditorium, 3 audiovisual rooms, a warehouse, a publishing unit, a clinic, a soccer stadium, an Olympic gymnasium, 2 basketball courts, an indoor swimming pool, extensive parking areas, a radio station, a cafeteria, an auditorium and a main esplanade.

The main campus is located in the Colonia Tecnológico area of Saltillo and is commonly listed at Blvd. Venustiano Carranza #2400, Col. Tecnológico, Saltillo, Coahuila, C.P. 25280. The campus comprises multiple academic buildings, specialized laboratories and workshops that support engineering and applied‑technology instruction; published institutional summaries and external directories report campus services including a library, computer and electronics laboratories, materials and industrial engineering labs, and auditoria for academic and community events.

A new satellite campus known as Campus Arteaga, located in the municipality of Arteaga, Coahuila to the south/southeast of Saltillo; the project was planned to expand institutional capacity and relieve crowding at the main Saltillo campus by relocating some academic activities and programs to the new site.

Construction and delivery of the principal works were reported complete in October 2025, when local authorities received the finished buildings, while regional coverage during 2024–2025 documented staged commissioning plans and indicated an initial capacity for the first stage of roughly 300 students with further phases to expand enrollment; several reports note that, although the infrastructure was delivered, the campus still required formal institutional activation (inauguration, equipment finalization and scheduling) before regular academic operations began.

== Governance and integration into Tecnológico Nacional de México ==
The Saltillo Institute of Technology is a public institution that operates under the regulatory framework of the Mexican Secretaría de Educación Pública (SEP) and is an affiliated campus within the National Technological Institute of Mexico (TecNM) system.

TecNM provides the organizational framework, normative guidance and centralized coordination for affiliated institutes, including academic program standardization, quality‑assurance mechanisms and centralized policy instruments that member campuses implement at the local level. The contemporary TecNM organization traces to a federal reorganization that culminated in the formal creation of the Tecnológico Nacional de México by presidential decree on 23 July 2014; that decree consolidated many state and regional technological institutes into a single national system to harmonize academic standards, strengthen governance and improve linkages with regional industry and development initiatives.

Member institutions such as Instituto Tecnológico de Saltillo implement TecNM's internal control manuals and quality‑management procedures and periodically report internal audits and certification activities in line with system requirements and SEP regulation.

== Academics ==
The institute offers a suite of undergraduate engineering and technology programs — including Electrical Engineering, Electronic Engineering, Industrial Engineering, Materials Engineering, Computer Systems Engineering, Mechatronics, Computer Engineering and Mechanical Engineering — together with business and management options at the undergraduate level.

At the graduate level ITS provides master's programs in Materials Engineering and Industrial Engineering and a doctoral program in Materials, reflecting a particular institutional emphasis on materials science and industrial applications.

== List of directors ==
List of directors and tenures:

- Santiago Tamez Anguiano (1950–1951)
- Narciso Urrutia Lozano (1951–1952)
- Segundo Rodríguez Alvarez (1952)
- Oscar Peart Pérez (1952–1960)
- Gabriel H. Acosta (1960–1961)
- Jorge Fernández Mier (1961–1966)
- Benjamín Rodríguez Zarzosa (1966–1967)
- Jorge Fernández Mier (1967–1973)
- Rodolfo Rosas Morales (1973–1976)
- David Hernandez Ochoa (1976)
- Luis Rosales Celis (1976–1981)
- Carlos Herrera Pérez (1981–1983)
- Manuel F. Flores Revuelta (1983–1986)
- Jesús H. Cano Ríos (1986–1988)
- José Claudio Tamez Saénz (1988–1991)
- Manuel F. Flores Revuelta (1991–1996)
- Juan Francisco Mancinas Casas (1996–2001)
- Enriqueta Gonzalez Aguilar (2001–2005)
- Jesús Contreras García (2005–2013)
- Arnoldo Solís Covarrubias (2013–2019)
- María Gloria Hinojosa (2019–2023)
- Ania Guadalupe Sánchez Ruiz (2023–present)

== Radio Tecnológico ==
Since 1991, at the initiative of Eng. Manuel F. Flores Revuelta, the first cultural radio station in Saltillo, Coahuila, "Atenas de México," began operations; its call sign is XHINS "Radio Tecnológico" on 100.1 FM, and it can also be tuned via the internet.

== Gallery ==
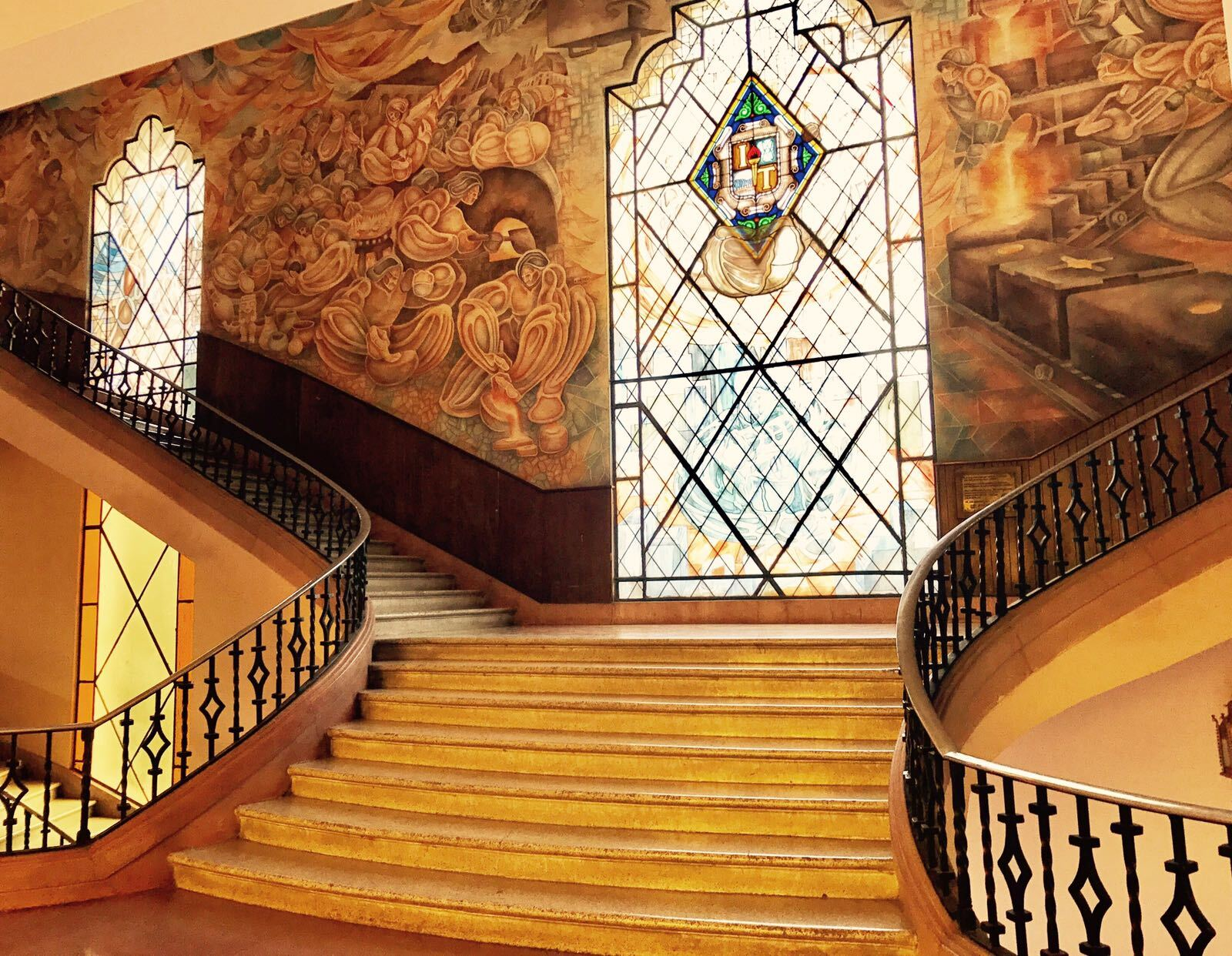
Interior view of the main building showing the stained-glass vitral and central stairway

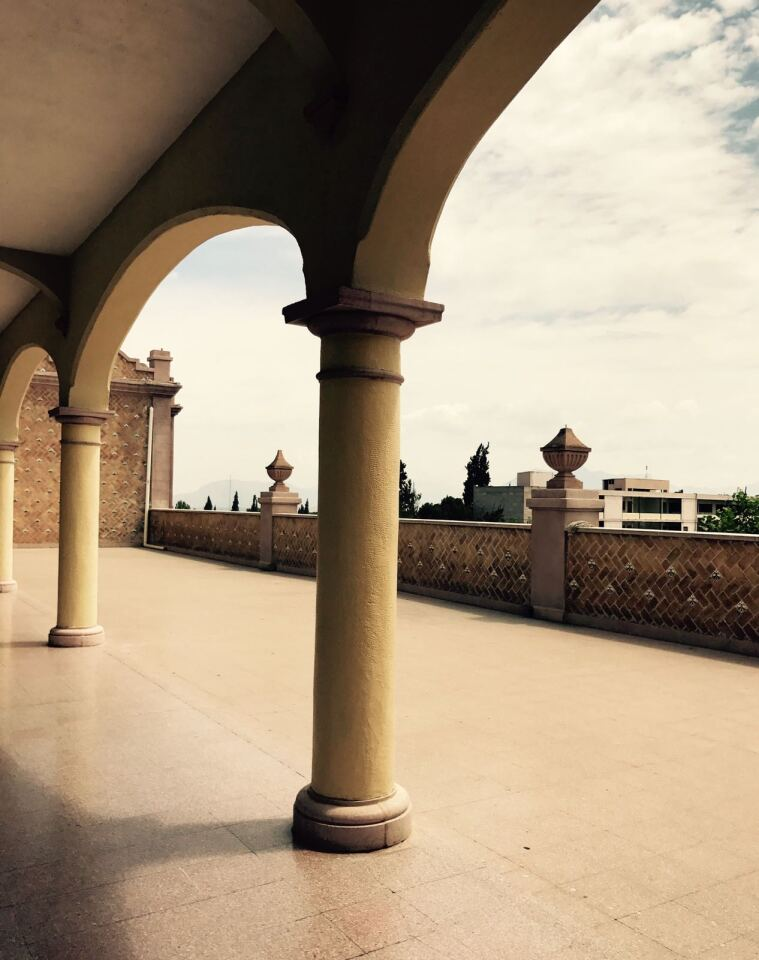
Exterior view of the third-floor terrace on the main building

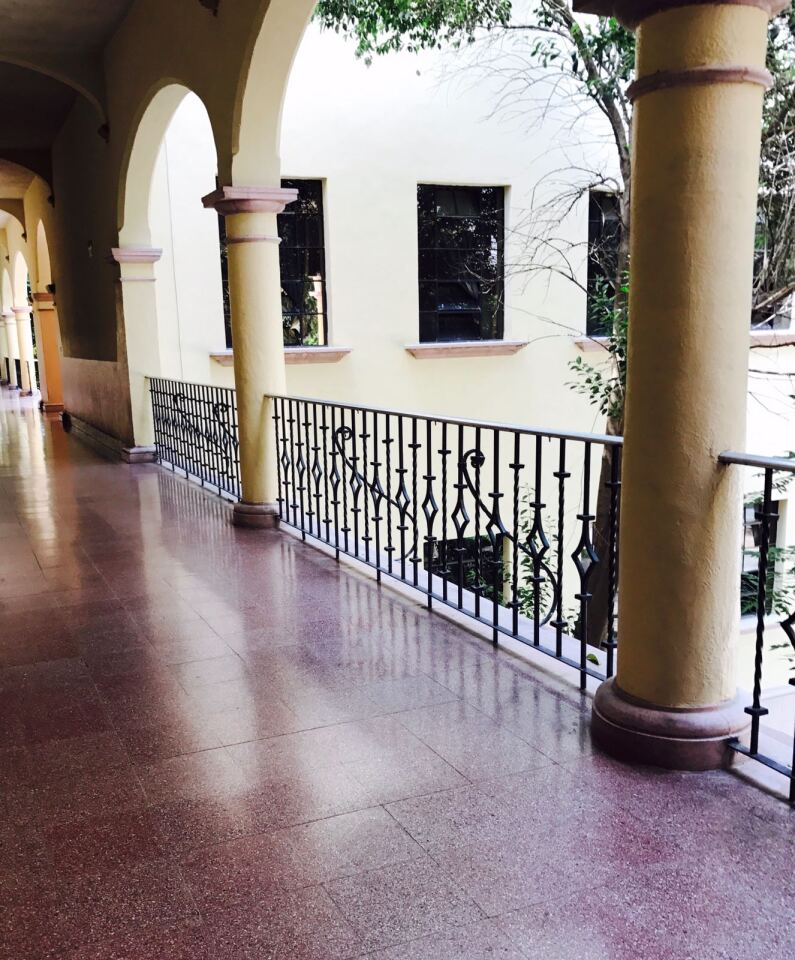
Interior hallway of the main building
