= Saltillo =

- City
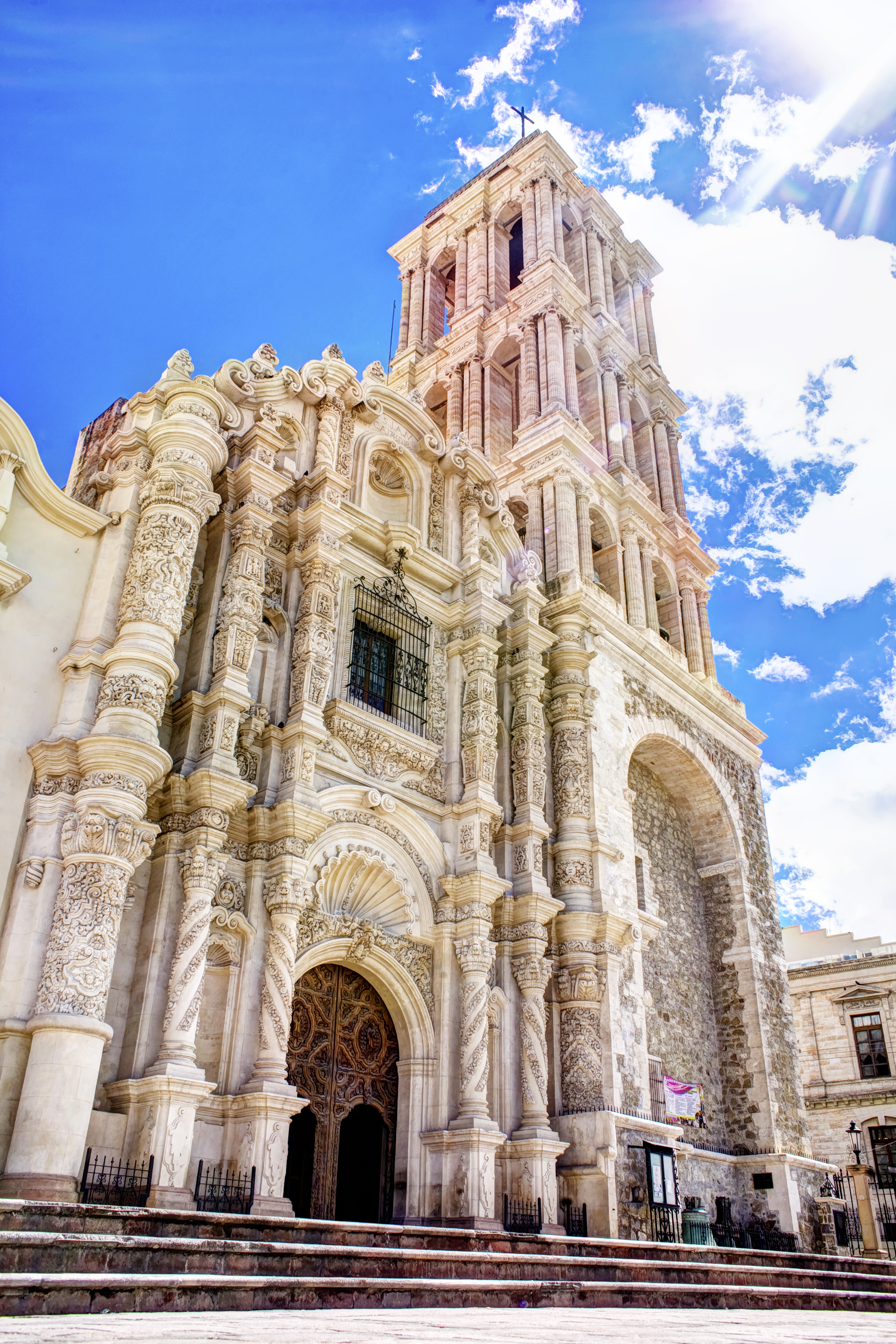
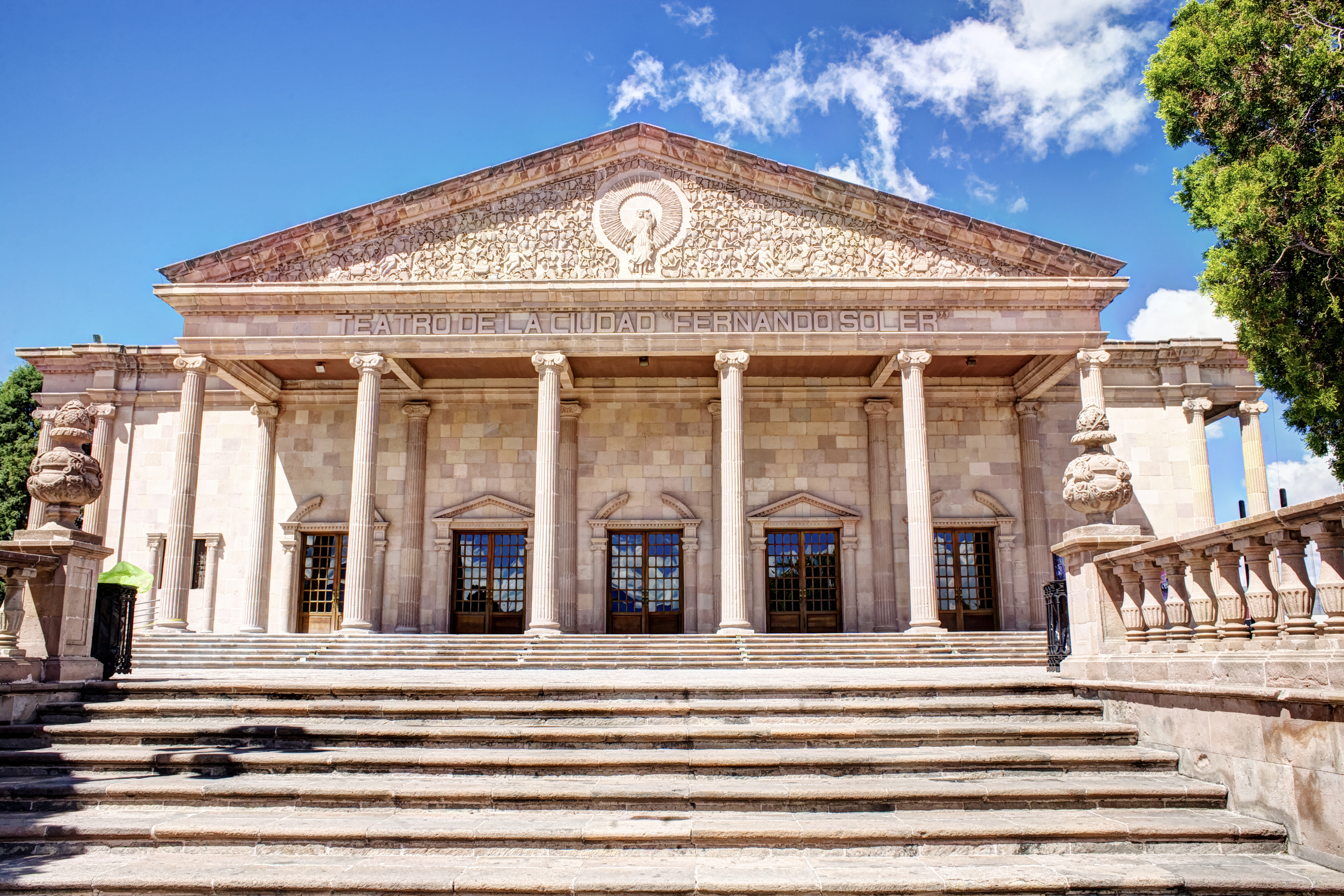
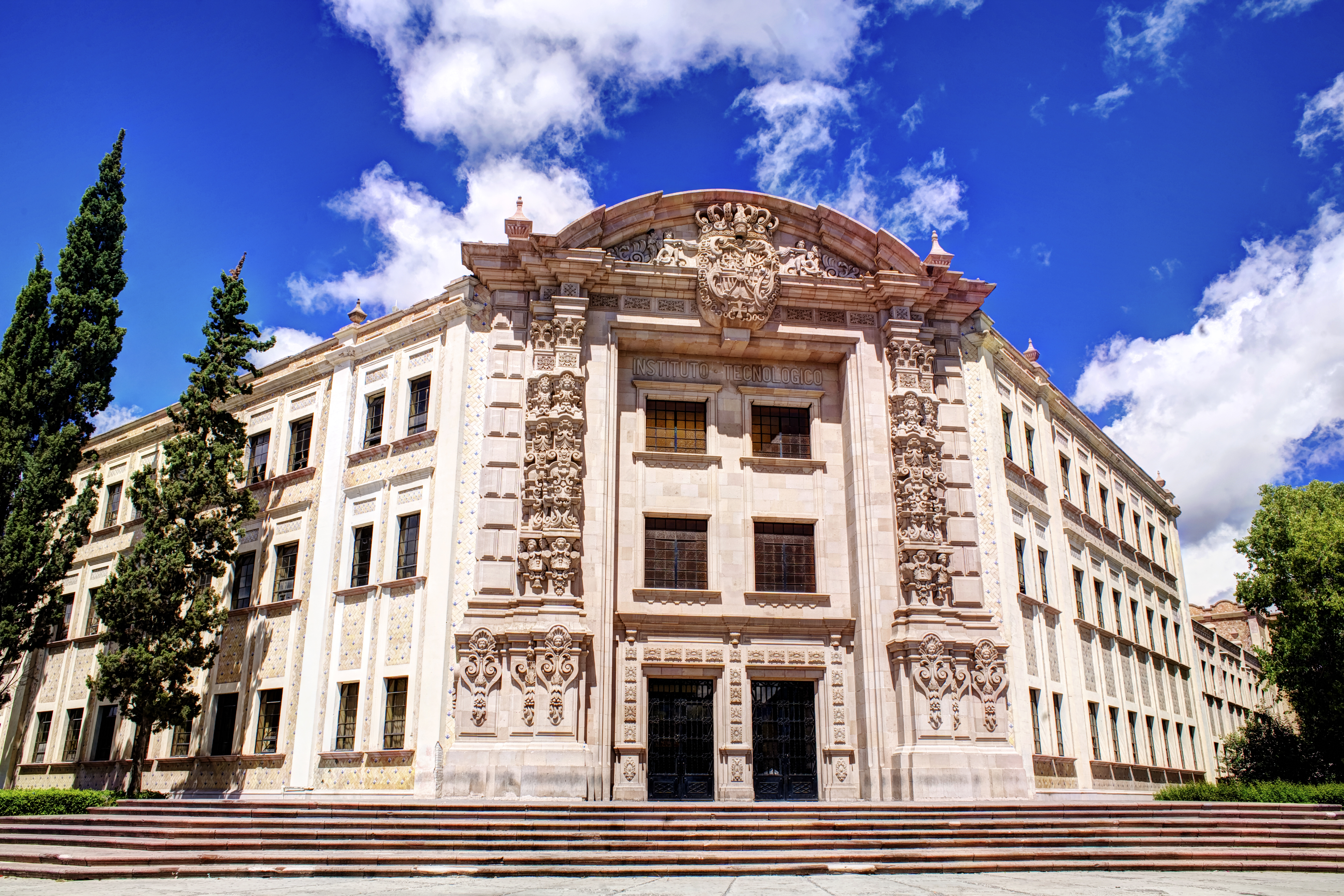
- Saltillo Cathedral Fernando Soler Theater Tecnológico de Saltillo

- Coat of arms
- Nicknames: The Athens of Mexico, The Detroit of Mexico
- Location of Saltillo within the municipality

- Location of Saltillo in Mexico Location of Saltillo in Coahuila
- Coordinates: 25°25′23″N 100°59′31″W
- Country: Mexico
- State: Coahuila
- Municipality: Saltillo
- Founded: July 25, 1577
- Founded as: Villa de Santiago del Saltillo
- Founder: Alberto del Canto

Government
  - Mayor: Javier Díaz González

Area
  - City: 272 km^{2} (105 sq mi)
- Elevation: 1,600 m (5,200 ft)

Population (2020)
  - City: 879,958
  - Density: 2,900/km^{2} (7,600/sq mi)
  - Urban: 1,017,806
  - Metro: 1,031,779
  - Demonym: Saltillense

GDP (PPP, constant 2015 values)
  - Year: 2023
  - Total: $29.4 billion
  - Per capita: $28,400
- Time zone: UTC−06:00 (Zona Centro)
- Postal code: 25000
- Area code: +52 844
- Website: www.saltillo.gob.mx

Saltillo (Latin American Spanish: [salˈtiʝo]) is the capital and largest city of the northeastern Mexican state of Coahuila and is also the municipal seat of the municipality of the same name. As of a 2020 census, Saltillo had a population of 879,958 people, while the Saltillo metropolitan area population was 1,031,779, making Saltillo the largest city in the state of Coahuila, and the 14th most populated metropolitan area in the country. Saltillo is considered the most competitive city in Mexico for cities with over one million inhabitants. Saltillo's success is due to its strong performance in the Urban Competitiveness Index (ICU), which is developed by the Mexican Institute for Competitiveness (IMCO). The ICU evaluates cities based on 35 indicators, including law, society, infrastructure, labor market, political system, and innovation. Saltillo is also the safest capital city in Mexico, according to INEGI data from 2025.

Saltillo is one of the most industrialized cities in Mexico and has one of the largest automotive industries in the country, with plants such as Tupy, Grupo Industrial Saltillo, General Motors, Stellantis, Daimler AG, Freightliner Trucks, BorgWarner, Plastic Omnium, Magna, and Nemak operating in the region. The city and its metropolitan area also house a large number of plants providing manufactured goods to various other multinational companies, including Tesla's new plant in Mexico, located less than an hour away in the neighboring Santa Catarina, Nuevo León.

== History ==
=== Colonial era ===
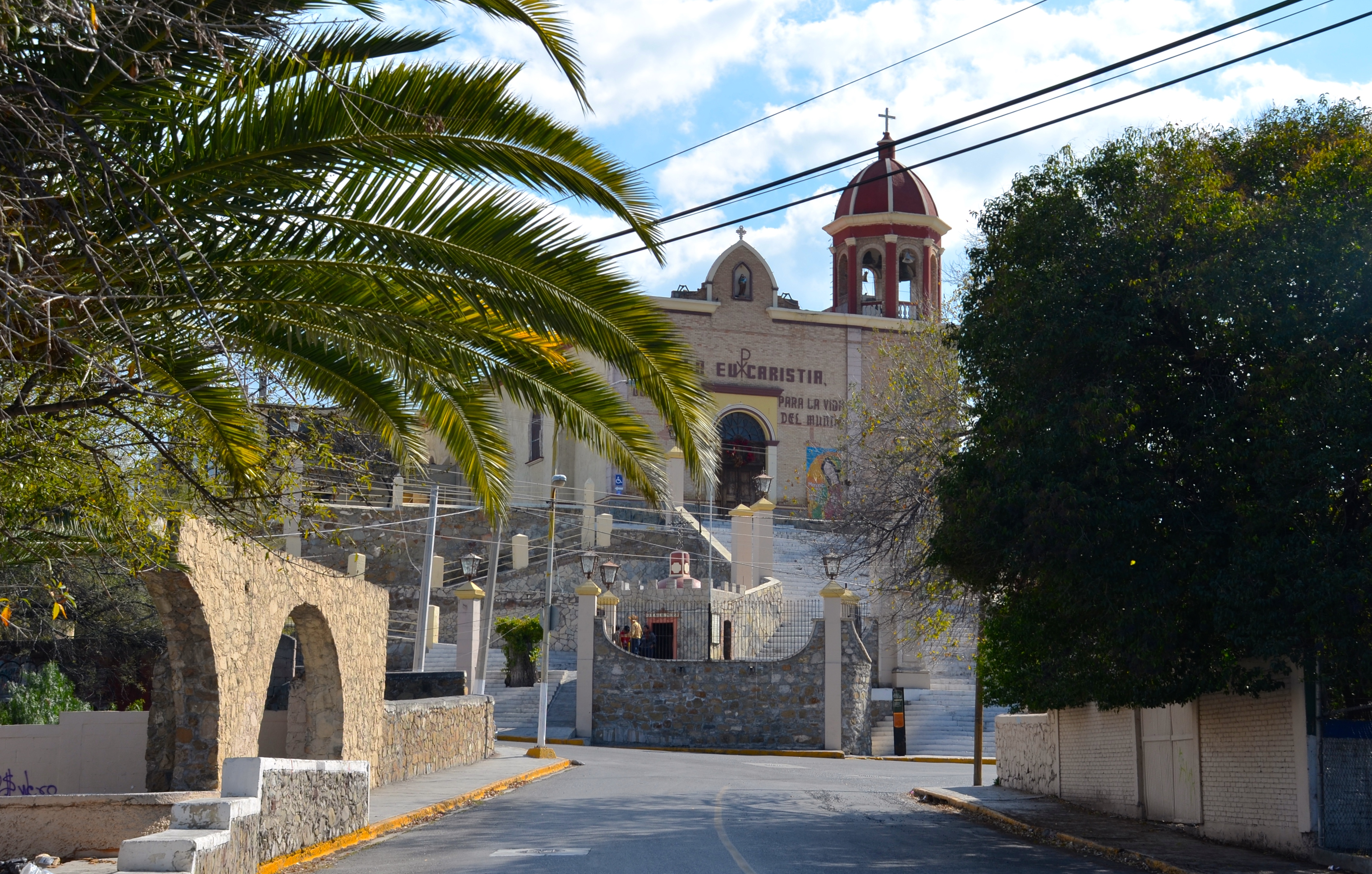
Parish of the Holy Christ of the Ojo de Agua, today recognized as the site of the founding of the city.

Founded in 1577 by Conquistador Alberto del Canto as Villa de Santiago del Saltillo, it is one of the oldest post-conquest settlements in Northern Mexico. The name of the city comes from a small waterfall that draws water from a spring. Nowadays, the spring is located within the Parish of the Holy Christ of the Ojo de Agua and is still visited by the local population.

In 1591, the Spanish resettled a community of their Tlaxcaltec allies in a separate town, San Esteban de Nueva Tlaxcala, located just across an irrigation ditch from Saltillo. The measure was taken in order to aid stalled colonization efforts and cultivate the land. In its early years, Saltillo grew slowly due to the hostility of the indigenous Chichimeca people and frequent water shortages. A hundred years after its founding, its population was only about 300 people, whilst the population of the adjacent Tlaxcaltec town, San Esteban, was about 1,750.

In the eighteenth century, Saltillo was a commercial center on the northern frontier which served as a bridge from central Mexico to regions further northeast such as the New Kingdom of León, New Santander, Coahuila, and Texas. It also supplied the silver mines of Zacatecas with wheat. It never rose to great prominence, but it did develop a commercial core and an agricultural and ranching sector that supplied its needs, with surpluses that could be sold. Saltillo became administratively important at the end of the eighteenth century, when a branch of the Royal Treasury was established in the city.

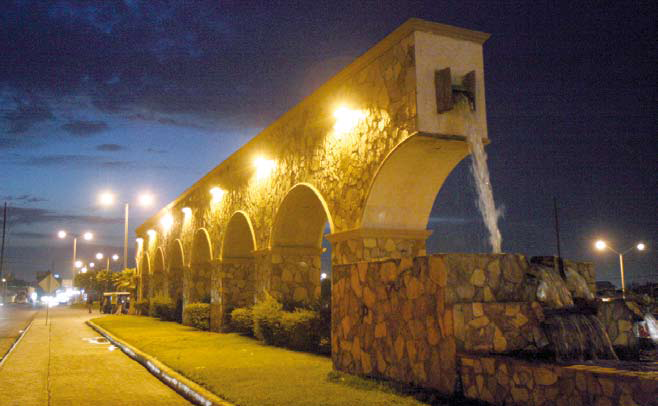
Historical aqueduct

Merchants, most of whom were Iberian Peninsula-born Spaniards, constituted the most important economic group, handling a wide variety of goods and selling in shops. They were the provincial branch of the transatlantic merchant sector, with ties to Mexico City merchants. Peninsular merchants in Saltillo married into the local elite society, acquired rural properties, and sought local office.

In the late seventeenth century, an annual trade fair was established, which carried Mexican livestock and manufactured goods to places as far as China and Europe. Saltillo could produce wheat commercially as long as there was access to water, but as with many other parts of the North, drought was a consistent threat. In the eighteenth century, there was a demand for draft animals, which Saltillo supplied.

=== Early Mexico ===
In 1824, Saltillo was made the capital of the state of Coahuila y Tejas, substituting Santiago de la Monclova as such. Three years later, Mexican Constituting Congress sanctioned that the city's name be changed to Leona Vicario, after one of the few female figures of the Mexican War of Independence. However, in 1831, a new State Congress decree merged Leona Vicario with the contiguous town of San Esteban (renamed Villalongín) and the name was changed back to Saltillo.

For nearly a decade, Saltillo held the administrative seat of a territory which included Coahuila alongside most of the territory of the current U.S. state of Texas until it was lost in the 1836 in the Texas Revolution. The Republic of Texas continued to have border disputes with Mexico's Centralist Republic, which continued to object to its independence. Peace was further disturbed by Comanche and Apache raiding, private vendettas, and separatist movements. On October 23, 1840, the Battle of Saltillo took place when 110 Texians and Tejanos crossed the Rio Grande to attack the city's government in support of an attempt to create a separate Republic of the Rio Grande between Texas and Mexico.

In 1845, Texas was annexed by the United States and its disputes with Mexico, aggravated by the Polk Administration, soon expanded into the Mexican–American War. The first phase of the war ended in September 1846 with Gen. Zachary Taylor's hard-won siege and occupation of Monterrey in Nuevo León. The War Department ordered him to remain there, but Taylor violated the armistice and went with Gen. William Worth and 1200 men to occupy Saltillo on 16 November to protect the approaches to his main army in Monterrey. Antonio López de Santa Anna had been allowed through the blockade of Veracruz to bring the war to a swift conclusion but had instead rallied the Mexican army and moved north. Gen. John E. Wool was sent to nearby Agua Nueva on December 21 and the indecisive Battle of Buena Vista occurred 12 miles (19 km) from Saltillo between February 22 and 23,1847, after which López de Santa Anna's army was forced to move south to protect San Luis Potosí and counter a seaborne invasion by Gen. Winfield Scott.

=== Porfiriato and Mexican Revolution ===
Modernity reached Coahuila with the arrival of the railroad in 1880, during the Porfiriato. In 1890, telegraph, telephone, and street lighting networks were created in addition to the construction of cultural buildings, including theaters and plazas, and buildings of a social nature such as hospices, civil hospitals, and sanitary structures consisting of drinking water and drainage systems.

During the 1910–1920 Mexican Revolution, Saltillo was occupied in separate events by the forces of Victoriano Huerta, Francisco Villa, and then by those of Venustiano Carranza. Hundreds of peasants were forced to join these various groups. As a result, many fled to Texas, including aristocratic families.

=== 20th century ===
In 1923 the Antonio Narro Agrarian University was founded. Two decades later in 1943, the Monterrey Institute of Technology and Higher Education was established in the city, then in 1951, the Technological Institute of Saltillo and in 1957, the Autonomous University of Coahuila was established.

Saltillo's agricultural climate in the second half of the 20th century was rapidly transforming into industrial activity; huge orchards disappeared and factories began to dominate the landscape.

In the second quarter of the twentieth century, Saltillo changed from agricultural and textile activities towards industrial activities, with the creation of companies such as CIFUNSA, CINSA, Éxito, and Molinos el Fénix, among others.

The true industrial explosion occurred in the '70s and '80s with the arrival of the car industry to the region. Companies such as General Motors and Chrysler, along with their respective satellite companies or suppliers, came to Saltillo. Since then, Saltillo and its Metropolitan Zone (Ramos Arizpe and Arteaga) are known as the "Detroit of Mexico". However, a movement is currently underway to diversify the industry, with the arrival of pharmaceutical companies, household appliances, chemicals, ceramics, and even parts for the aerospace industry.

== Geography ==
El Cerro del Pueblo (The Town Hill) and its 4-metre (13 ft) cross overlook the city. The city's elevation makes it colder and windier than the neighboring city of Monterrey. Saltillo lies in the Chihuahuan Desert near the city of Arteaga. The city is flanked by the Zapalinamé mountains, which are part of the Sierra Madre Oriental. According to local legend, by looking at the relief of the mountains one can see the relief of Zapalinamé, chieftain of the Guachichil tribe who rose against the Spaniards in 1584.

=== Orography and hydrography ===
==== San Lorenzo Canyon ====
Composed of geological formations of the Jurassic period, the San Lorenzo Canyon, located southeast of Saltillo in the Sierra de Zapalinamé, is a tourist attraction for outdoor activities and extreme sports such as rock climbing, rappelling, mountain biking, hiking, mountaineering and camping.

==== Arroyo de los Ojitos ====
It begins south of Francisco Coss Boulevard, crosses the Venustiano Carranza Boulevard, passes between the Liverpool and Home Depot buildings, and is channeled through Nazario Boulevard Ortiz towards Benito Juárez Street.

==== Arroyo de la Tortola ====
It begins its course in the Magisterio neighborhood, towards the temple of Santo Cristo del Ojo de Agua, crosses the center of the city between the streets Arteaga and Matamoros near the Coahuila school, then converges with the channel that descends near Antonio Cárdenas Street (or South Abasolo), is channeled underground through the Topo Chico neighbourhood, down through Nava Street and then by Luis Echeverría and down again by Abasolo Norte and connects in Nazario Ortiz with the Charquillo.

==== Arroyo del Charquillo ====
It starts from the eastern end of the Ateneo street, goes down behind the sports San Isidro passes to the side of Campo Redondo, crosses the lake of the Sports City towards the Tecnológico de Monterrey and continues until converging with the Cevallos stream at the Boulevard Moctezuma or Pedro Figueroa.

==== Cevallos Creek ====
It starts in the Zapaliname mountain range, from the Lomas de Lourdes neighborhood, it passes along the Luis Echeverría Oriente Boulevard, passes behind the Mercado de Abastos, crosses on one side of Plaza Sendero, then descends along Tezcatlipoca street, passes near the Club Campestre and converges with the Navarreña stream on the road to Monterrey and on the way to the Valdés.

==== Arroyo de la Navarreña ====
Starts in the mountains near the Vista Hermosa neighborhood, crosswise through neighborhoods such as Founders and Morelos, goes down the side of the Corona Motel on Fundadores Boulevard, pass by the Dolores Pantheon on Jesus Valdés Sánchez Boulevard and continues towards the South, surrounding the Country Club on its east side and the Country Club subdivision and continues to the city of Ramos.

==== Land El Aguaje ====
Located in the San Lorenzo Canyon southeast of the city of Saltillo. Composed of geological formations originated between the Upper Jurassic and Quaternary that facilitate the intense infiltration of water to the subsoil, thus allowing the constant recharge of the aquifers that supply drinking water to the city of Saltillo.On July 3, 2008, the Government of the State of Coahuila decided to buy the property, which was granted to Mexican Wildlife Protection in bailment on July 23, 2012, for its management and conservation.

==== Sierra La Concordia ====
It is the highest mountain in the municipality, reaches 3,462 meters above sea level.

==== Sierra Catana ====
The Sierra Catana mountain reaches 3,104 meters above sea level.

=== Climate ===
Saltillo has a hot desert climate (Köppen climate classification: BWh), slightly too dry to be a hot semi-arid climate. Saltillo is located in the Chihuahuan Desert but temperatures are cooler than other desert cities in Mexico because it is located at an altitude of 1,600 meters (5,250 ft). Summers are slightly hot with cool nights, and winters are sunny but cool. Rainfall is scarce but more prominent in summer. Snowfall and sub-freezing temperatures are not unknown, but do not occur every year.

Climate data for Saltillo (1991–2020, extremes 1949–2020)
Month	Jan	Feb	Mar	Apr	May	Jun	Jul	Aug	Sep	Oct	Nov	Dec	Year
Record high °C (°F)	36.5 (97.7)	35.0 (95.0)	37.0 (98.6)	39.0 (102.2)	41.0 (105.8)	40.5 (104.9)	39.5 (103.1)	37.0 (98.6)	38.5 (101.3)	39.0 (102.2)	34.5 (94.1)	32.6 (90.7)	41.0 (105.8)
Mean daily maximum °C (°F)	20.1 (68.2)	22.3 (72.1)	24.9 (76.8)	28.0 (82.4)	30.1 (86.2)	30.1 (86.2)	29.4 (84.9)	29.0 (84.2)	26.4 (79.5)	25.2 (77.4)	22.7 (72.9)	20.5 (68.9)	25.7 (78.3)
Daily mean °C (°F)	12.5 (54.5)	14.5 (58.1)	17.1 (62.8)	20.2 (68.4)	22.7 (72.9)	23.4 (74.1)	23.2 (73.8)	22.7 (72.9)	20.3 (68.5)	18.4 (65.1)	15.6 (60.1)	13.2 (55.8)	18.6 (65.5)
Mean daily minimum °C (°F)	4.9 (40.8)	6.7 (44.1)	9.3 (48.7)	12.5 (54.5)	15.4 (59.7)	16.6 (61.9)	16.9 (62.4)	16.3 (61.3)	14.2 (57.6)	11.6 (52.9)	8.3 (46.9)	5.9 (42.6)	11.6 (52.9)
Record low °C (°F)	−14.5 (5.9)	−13.0 (8.6)	−6.0 (21.2)	0.0 (32.0)	5.0 (41.0)	6.5 (43.7)	7.0 (44.6)	2.0 (35.6)	1.3 (34.3)	−3.0 (26.6)	−5.0 (23.0)	−11.0 (12.2)	−14.5 (5.9)
Average precipitation mm (inches)	13.6 (0.54)	9.9 (0.39)	11.2 (0.44)	13.2 (0.52)	28.5 (1.12)	40.1 (1.58)	63.7 (2.51)	40.7 (1.60)	62.0 (2.44)	27.3 (1.07)	7.5 (0.30)	8.0 (0.31)	325.7 (12.82)
Average precipitation days (≥ 0.1 mm)	4.1	2.9	3.6	3.4	6.8	8.1	10.7	9.6	9.7	6.1	3.5	2.6	71.1
Average snowy days	0.1	0.0	0.0	0.0	0.0	0.0	0.0	0.0	0.0	0.0	0.0	0.2	0.3
Average relative humidity (%)	55.7	53.1	49.5	47.7	52.0	57.5	63.1	67.7	76.2	67.0	59.7	55.1	58.7
Mean monthly sunshine hours	225.6	226.9	265.3	275.4	288.4	277.8	256.1	261.3	212.8	247.8	230.6	218.5	2,986.5
Source 1: Servicio Meteorologico Nacional, NOAA NCEI (humidity-sun 1991-2020)
Source 2: Colegio de Postgraduados (snow days)

== Demographics ==
=== Population ===
The city of Saltillo according to the last official count and delimitation carried out in 2020 jointly by the INEGI, the CONAPO and the SEDESOL, is the 14th most populated city in Mexico with 879,958 inhabitants.

Historical population
Year	Pop.	±%
1900	23,996	—
1910	35,414	+47.6%
1921	40,451	+14.2%
1930	45,272	+11.9%
1940	49,430	+9.2%
1950	69,842	+41.3%
1960	98,839	+41.5%
1970	161,114	+63.0%
1980	284,937	+76.9%
1990	420,947	+47.7%
2000	578,046	+37.3%
2010	725,123	+25.4%
2020	879,958	+21.4%

demographic vertical bar chart of between 1900 and 2020
Population from the censuses of the National Institute of Statistics and Geography (INEGI) from 1900 to 2020.

== Economy ==
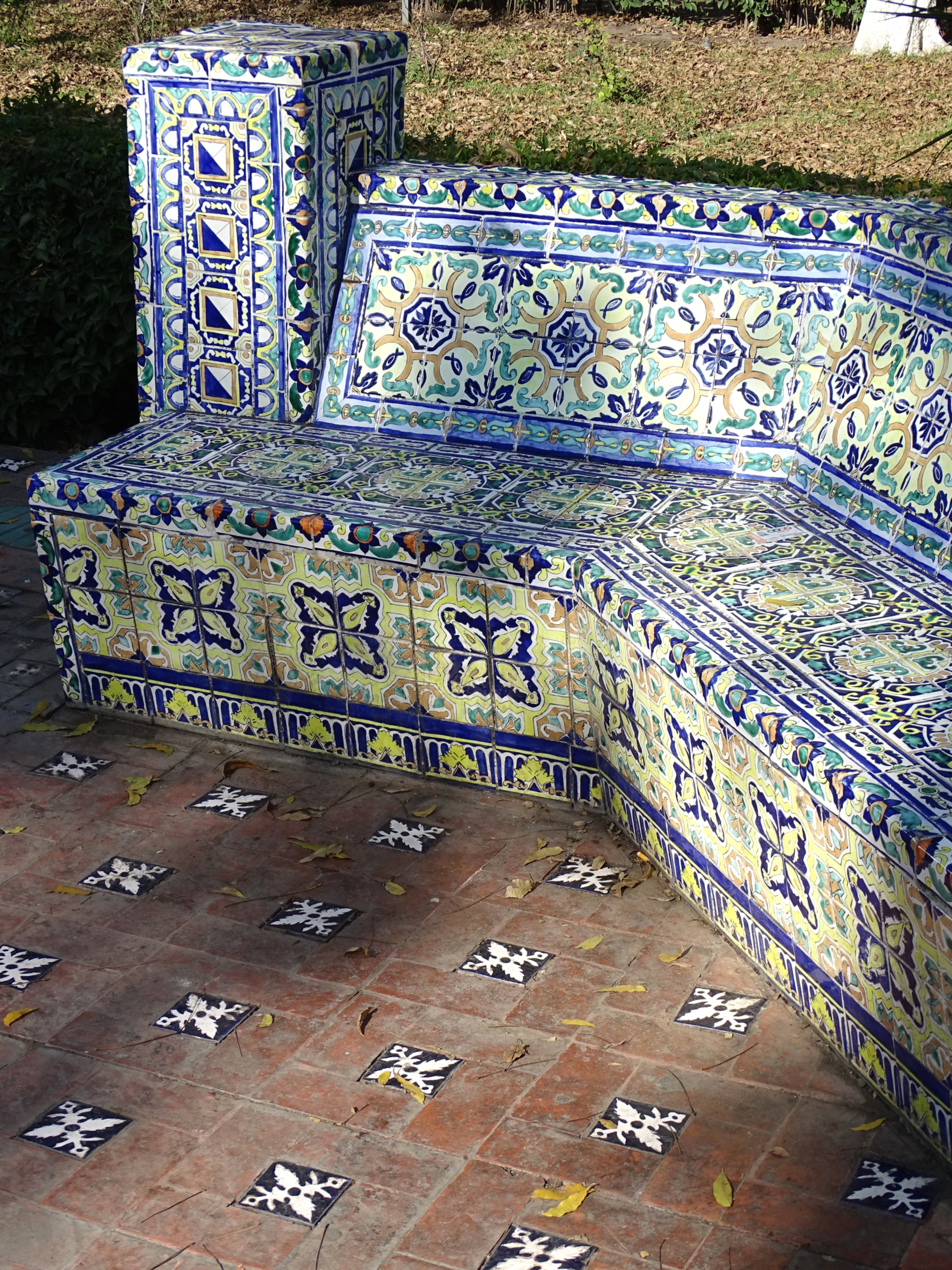
Saltillo tile in the historic city center

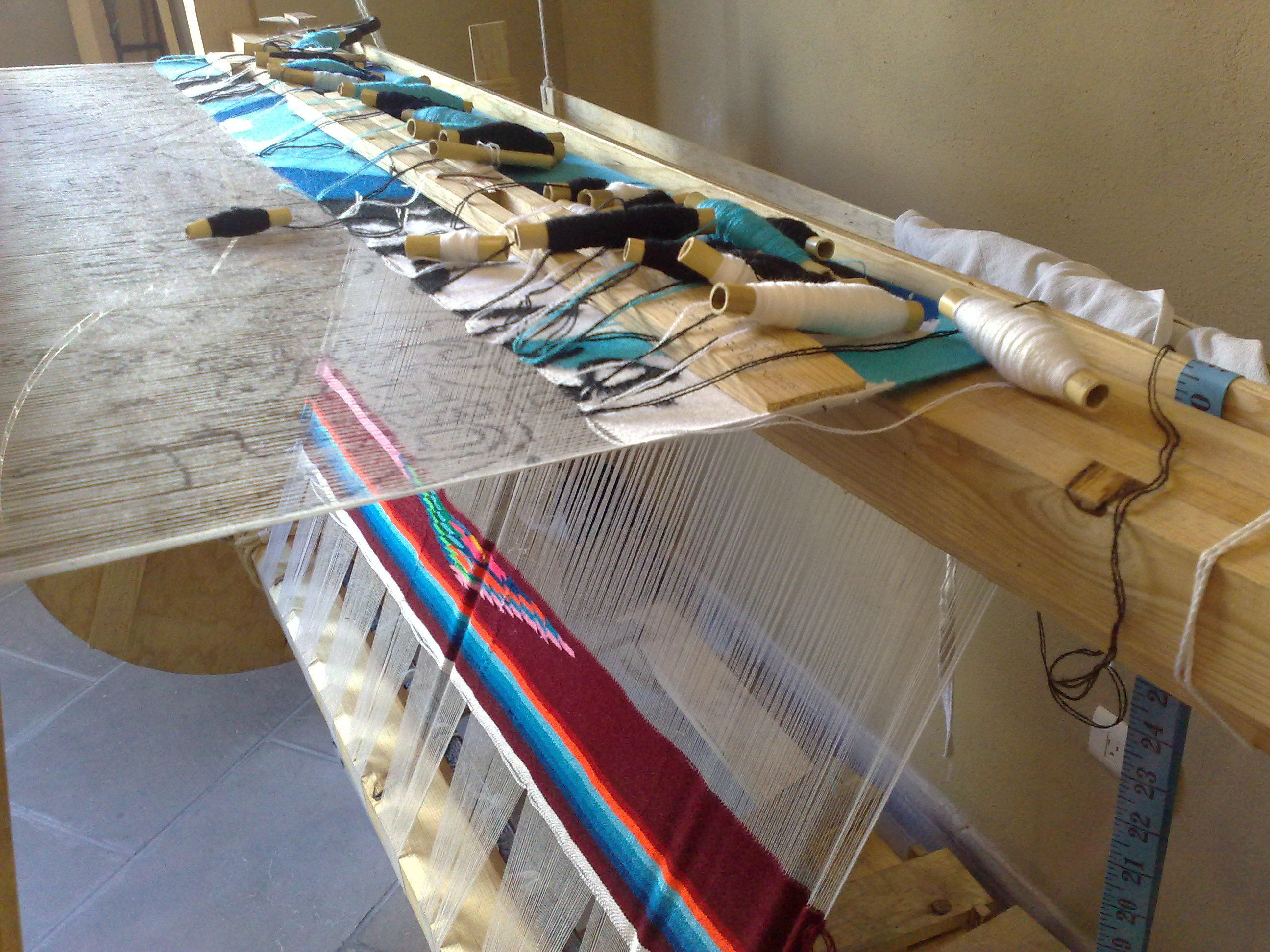
Sarapes being made

Saltillo's most famous exports are Saltillo tile and the locally woven multi-colored sarapes. Mercedes-Benz and General Motors both have assembly plants there and Chrysler operates a truck assembly plant, a sedan assembly plant, two engine facilities, and a car transmissions plant. Of all the vehicles made in Mexico, 37.4% of cars and 62.6% of trucks are assembled in Saltillo. Saltillo is home to the Grupo Industrial Saltillo, an important manufacturing conglomerate that makes home appliances, silverware, and auto parts.

The General Motors plant manufactures vehicles for export to Japan, Canada, and Central America as well as for domestic purchase. It builds the Chevrolet C2, Chevrolet Monza, Chevrolet Captiva, Chevrolet HHR, Saturn Vue hybrid, Saab 9-4X, and Cadillac SRX. As of 2016 the plant produces about one third of the firm's full-sized pick-up trucks.

== Education ==
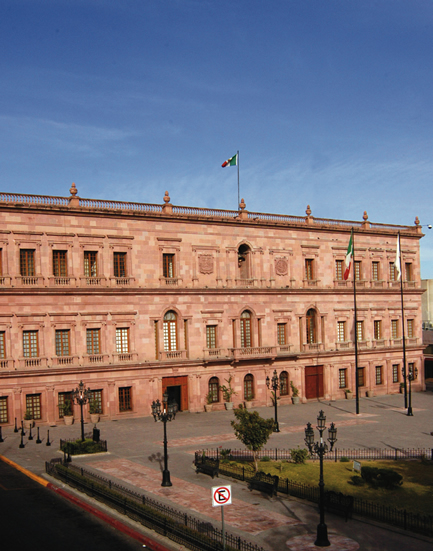
Local government palace

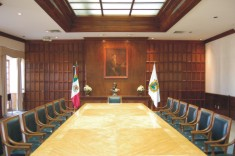
Inside the government palace

Saltillo's main universities are the Universidad Autónoma de Coahuila, the Instituto Tecnológico de Saltillo, the Tec de Monterrey Saltillo Campus, El Instituto de Filologia Hispanica, the Universidad Carolina and the Universidad Autónoma Agraria Antonio Narro.

== Government ==
The city of Saltillo is the municipal seat of the municipality of Saltillo. The current mayor is José María Fraustro Siller, from the Partido Revolucionario Institucional (PRI).

== Sites of interest ==
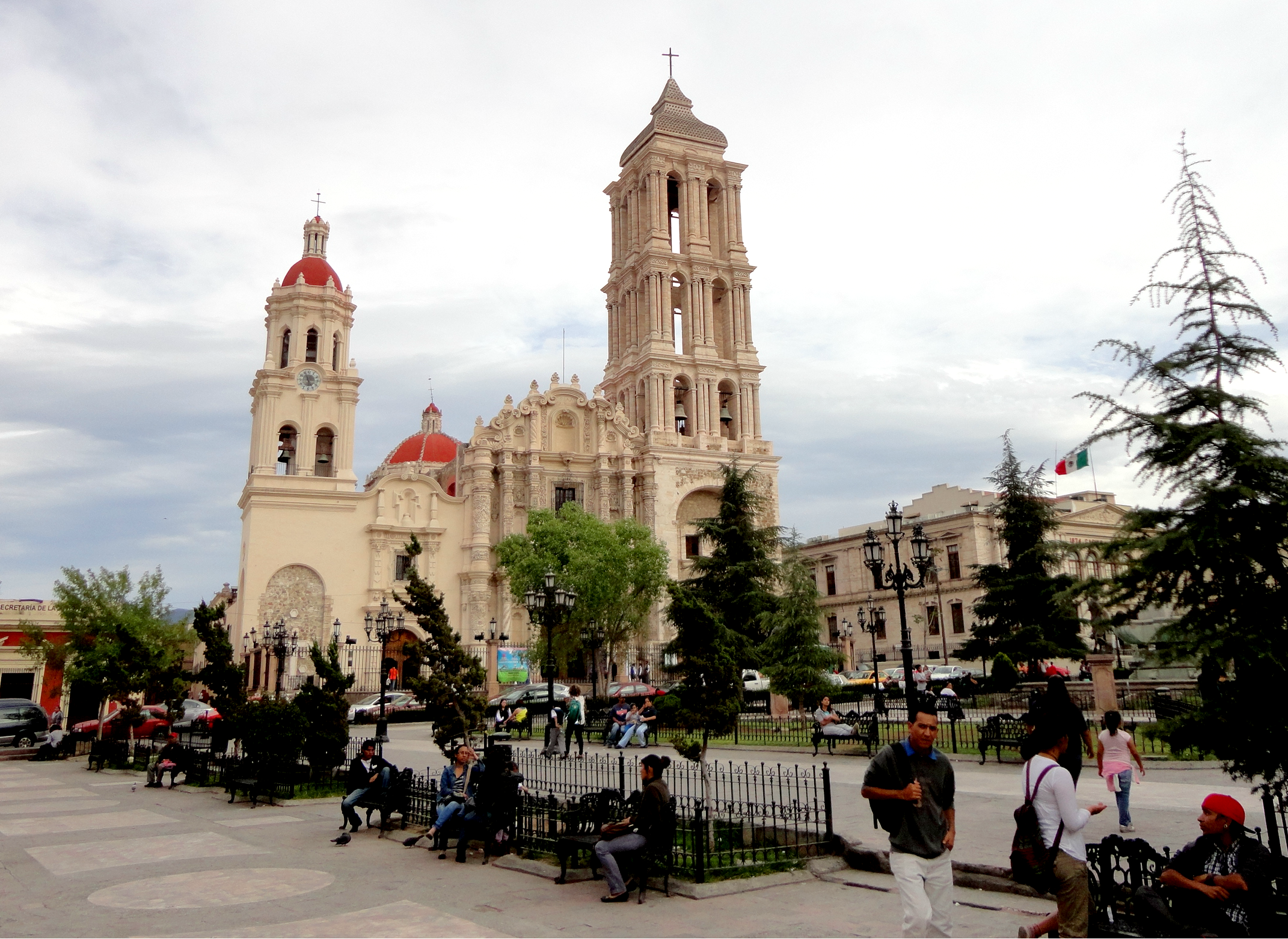
Saltillo Cathedral

=== Cultural ===
- 'Fernando Soler City Theater:' Designed by the architect Francisco Flores Flores, it opened on March 26, 1979. The theater hosts plays, operas, music, dance, children's shows, festivals, conferences, government reports, graduations, and congresses. The first performance in this theater was "The Efforts of a House" by Sor Juana Inés de la Cruz, under the direction of Luis G. Basurto with scenery by David Antón and the actors Magda Guzmán, Rubén Rojo, José Baviera, and Carmen Monje, among others.
- 'Paraninfo del Ateneo Fuente:' Auditorium in the Universidad Autonoma de Coahuila, which holds academic and cultural events. Has mural works by the Catalan painter Salvador Tarazona, of which the one on the north side is dedicated to science and the one on the south side is dedicated to arts and culture.
- 'Casa Purcell Cultural Center:' Architectural work built in the 19th century by the architect Alfredo Gilles in the style of the old houses of Ireland. Previously owned by Guillermo Purcell, it is now a cultural center that has exhibition spaces for contemporary art.
- 'García Carrillo Theater Cultural Center:' It has a gallery for temporary exhibitions. It also has an auditorium where conferences, concerts, readings and, film projections are held.
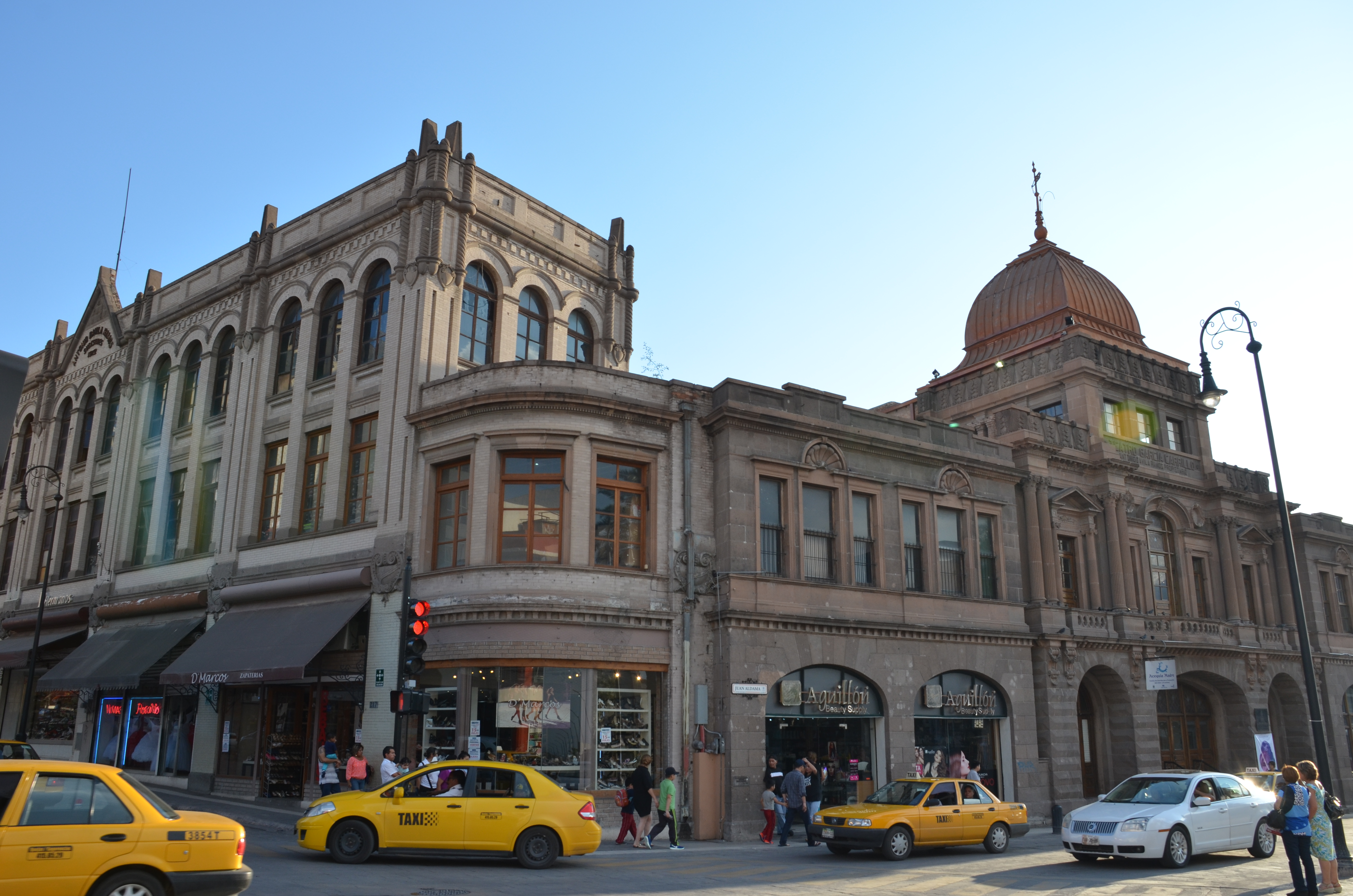
  García Carrillo Theater, Aldama and Allende Street, downtown area.
- 'The Cultural Center Vito Alessio Robles:' Former headquarters of the City Council of Saltillo, it has a mural by Helena Huerta on the history of Coahuila, personal objects of Don Vito Alessio Robles, a library (with a collection of old books and documents of historians Vito Alessio Robles and Oscar Dávila), and temporary exhibitions of modern art.
- 'Coahuilense Institute of Culture:' Culture and art created in the state are promoted and disseminated here. It has an art gallery, workshops, conference rooms, as well as a bookstore and cafeteria.
- 'El Recinto a Juárez:' It houses the Coahuilense College of Historical Research. It offers library services and holds plays, conferences, book presentations, and other cultural activities.
- 'University Cultural Heritage Site:' House dating from 1680, belonging to the Purcell family during the twentieth century. It was the headquarters of the National Bank of Mexico and from 2005 it is used for displaying the artistic heritage of the city.
- 'Aurora Morales de López University Cultural Site:' A space for artistic expression of the Autonomous University of Coahuila. The site broadcasts and houses works by Coahuilenses.

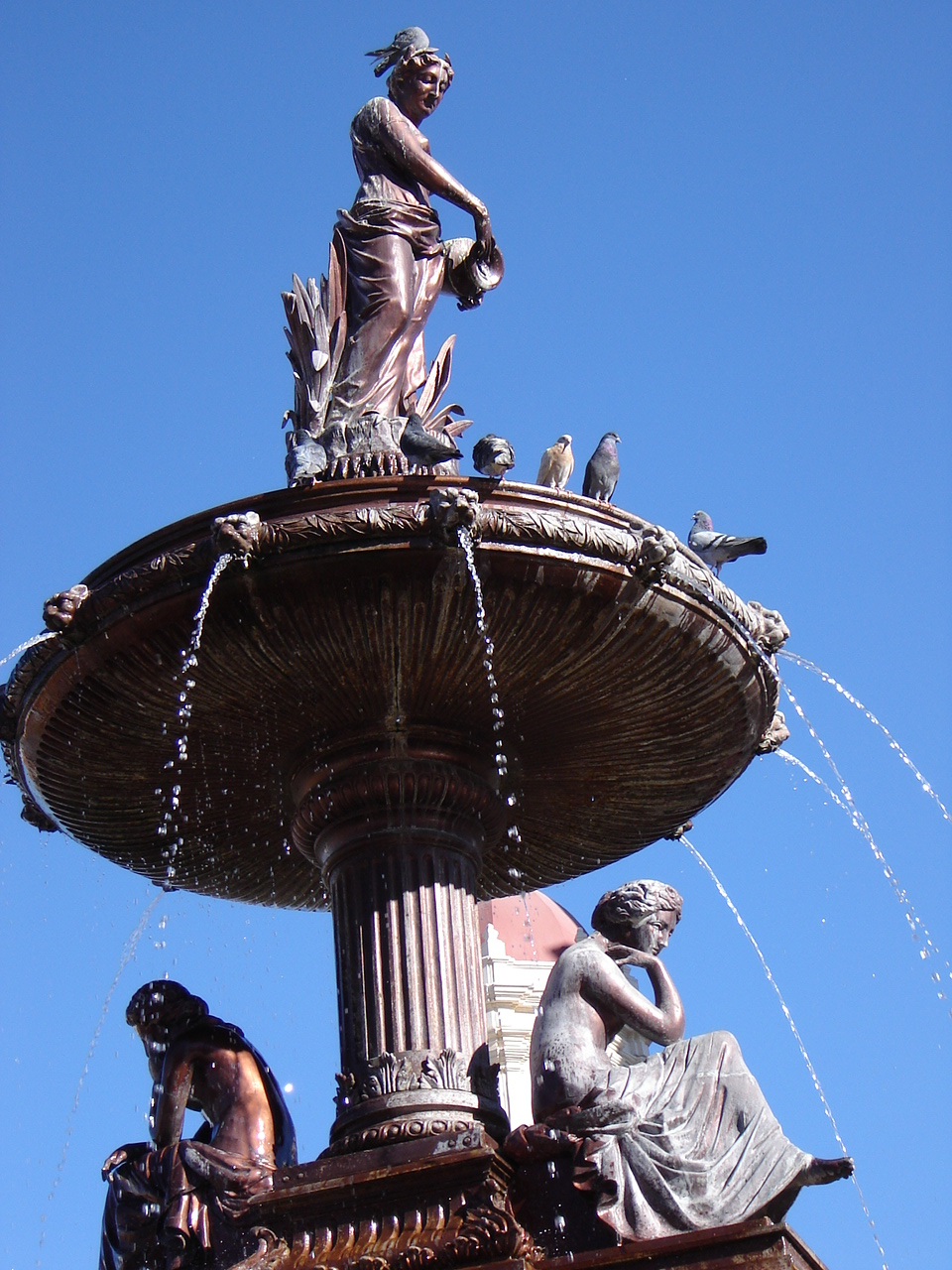
Plaza de Armas fountain

=== Religious ===
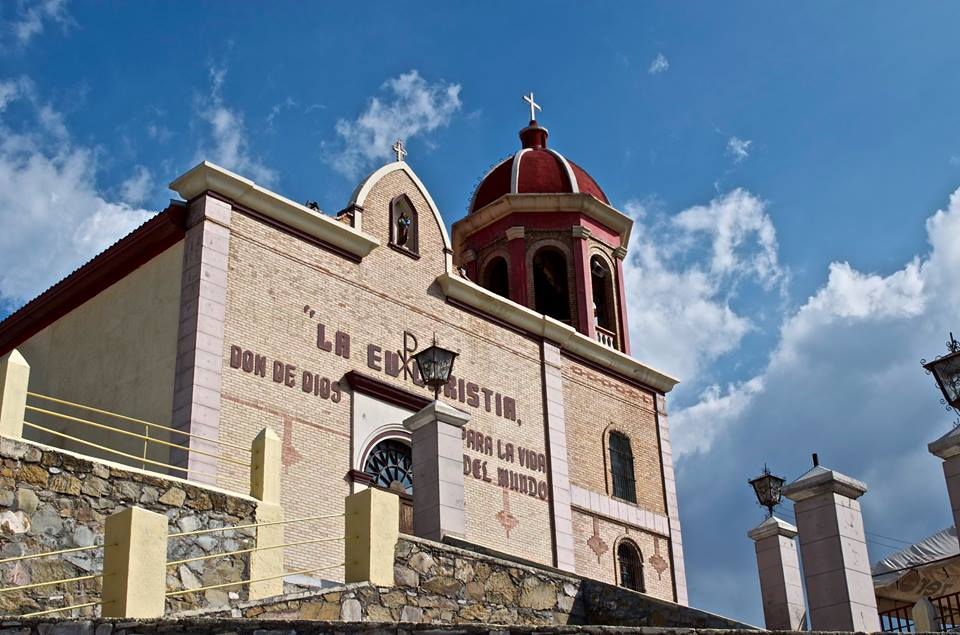
Church of Santo Cristo del Ojo de Agua.

- 'Cathedral of Santiago Apostol:' Dedicated to the Apostle St James the greater, the church began its construction in 1745 as a parish and in 1891 became the Cathedral of Saltillo. It combines architectural styles such as baroque and the churrigueresco. Inside, its altarpieces stand out, as well as a collection of 45 oil paintings. The silver front on the altar of San José is an 18th-century piece that participated in the exhibition "Mexico, Splendors of Thirty Centuries", which toured the US and Mexico for three years.
- 'Church of Santo Cristo del Ojo de Agua:' It is located at the top of the hill where the spring comes from which the name of the city emerges. This church houses a crucified Christ known as the Holy Christ of the Waterhole (Ojo de Agua), to whom many parishioners attribute the presence of the spring, which seems to spring from its base. The temple began to be built around 1917 and the Holy Christ of the Waterhole arrived in the city in 1927 by efforts of the third bishop of Saltillo, Jesús María Echavarría y Aguirre.
- 'Parish of San Esteban:' Temple built in 1592 when the town of San Esteban de la Nueva Tlaxcala was founded, inhabited by the Tlaxcaltecs.
- 'Temple of San Juan Nepomuceno:' Jesuit temple built in the 19th century. Its neoclassical facade contains unfinished towers, dome, and windows. Inside are oil paintings by Father Gonzalo Carrasco, evangelical sculptures, and a mural of the life of San Juan.
- 'Sanctuary of Guadalupe:' Gothic style church built in 1890. In the upper and central part of the building there is a clock, ogival windows and arch buttresses, characteristic of the Gothic style that arrived in Mexico after the Maximilian Empire.

=== Museums ===
In Saltillo there are about 22 museums, including: Museum of the Presidents' Coahuilenses, Campus of the University Cultural Heritage, 'Pinacoteca Ateneo Fuente' of the Autonomous University of Coahuila, Museum-Parish Archive, Hall of Natural History.

- 'Museum of the Coahuilenses Presidents:' Erected to honor the memory and legacy of the five coahuilenses who have been Presidents of Mexico: Melchor Múzquiz, Francisco I. Madero, Eulalio Gutiérrez Ortiz, Roque González Garza and Venustiano Carranza. Display photographs, documents and personal and official objects of these characters. It has the first presidential band that Guadalupe Victoria during his tenure as President.
- 'Landín Chapel Museum:' The old chapel, built at the end of the 18th century, it has been restored and preserved more recently. It includes a museum area where a collection of 20 paintings of religious art from the 17th and 18th centuries is exhibited.
- 'Museo de la Angostura:' In memory of the triumph of Mexican troops against the United States in 1847. It is housed in an old house that was once the State Normal School.
- 'Catrina Museum:' Picturesque space where we can appreciate the history of Catrina, who represents death in the traditional Day of the Dead has a cafeteria where hot chocolate and bread are served every day of the year.
- 'Bird Museum of Mexico:' It has a collection of more than 2,500 taxidermized birds, (the largest collection of birds in Mexico and Latin America) mostly belonging to the Mexican territory. The enclosure that houses it was the former Jesuit College «San Juan Nepomuceno».
- 'Museo del Normalismo:' Tells the history of education in Coahuila. It has a collection of pedagogical instruments and a room dedicated to distinguished graduates of the Benemérita Normal School of Coahuila.
- 'Museo del Sarape and Typical Costumes:' Promotes the investigation and rescue of a material heritage that is part of the identity of both Saltillenses and Mexicans. It exhibits the first sarapes made in the 19th and 20th centuries, as well as the typical costumes of the region.
- 'The Gyroscope Museum:' Science museum.
- 'Rubén Herrera Museum:' House dating from the 18th century, where a collection of the Zacatecan master Rubén Herrera made in Mexico and Europe is displayed. It has a room for temporary exhibitions, auditorium, and library.
- 'MAG Graphic Arts Museum:' In this new Museum in Saltillo, there is an important collection of more than 1,400 objects that belonged to José Guadalupe Posada, Mexican engraver, known for his prints and social cartoons, inspired by Mexican folklore. It seeks to promote knowledge and appreciation of both industrial and artistic printing techniques, value the work of visual artists and rescue the appreciation for the trade of the printers.
- 'Cato Museum:' The journalist and chronicler of the city.
- 'Museo del Horror:' Horror.

== Culture ==
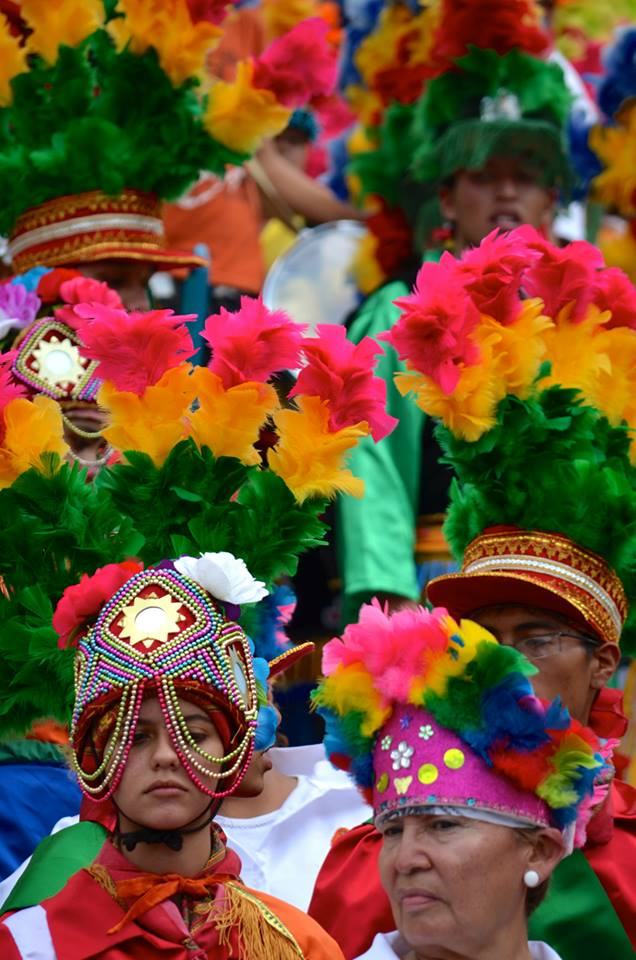
Matlachinada 2014. Event held every year, with Matachines from all over the state of Coahuila.

Saltillo's local culture shares many features with the larger Northern Mexican culture. However, it has various particularities that denote a great cultural and historical wealth. Some of them are highlighted below.

=== Matachines ===
The danza de matachines is a carnivalesque dance that, in addition to being performed in Saltillo, is performed in various locations ranging from the US state of New Mexico to the Mexican states of Jalisco, Nayarit, Aguascalientes, Zacatecas, San Luis Potosí, Nuevo León and Chihuahua. As a cultural manifestation, this dance has controversial origins. Cruz Viveros, an academic from Veracruz, points out that it must have arrived in America with the Spanish Conquest, since it is similar to the Moorish dances that were already used in Spain, Portugal, Italy and France since the Middle Ages. According to him, in Mexico the dance would have been subject to a process of redefinition with which it would have been intended to attribute an indigenous origin. From this moment on, the event in which it takes place began to be called matlachinada, whereas the dancers, were dubbed matlachines (both terms supposedly derived from the Nahuatl word "matlatzinca").

Regardless of its possible European origins, the dance that is performed in Saltillo in honor of the Holy Christ, incorporates in its costumes and choreography various elements that, at least, belong to the Mexican imaginary of "the indigenous" and, at most, can be attributed to the Tlaxcaltecs. Among these elements we find bows and arrows, headdresses with multicolored feathers, little stones, decorated skirts and sandals. In addition, the dance is organized by the inhabitants of the Ojo de Agua neighborhood, formerly inhabited by people of Tlaxcaltec origin.

=== Sarape de Saltillo ===
The sarape (serape, or jorongo) is a rectangular garment, for male use, with or without opening for the head and multicolored stripes which are reminiscent of a rainbow. It is one of the most representative objects of Mexico. The serape is a garment of traditional Mexican men's clothing, usually brightly colored and with traditional patterns. It is usually made of wool fiber that maintains heat more efficiently, but is also woven from cotton. The thickness of the yarn chosen for the fabric, as well as its material, the elaboration of each necessary knot and the final size of the serape, are variables that influence the final weight and feel of the serape. It is traditional from various parts of Mexico, as in Saltillo. In fact, it was colonizers of Tlaxcalan origin who took the serape to Coahuila from Zaragoza, Zacatecas and probably to New Mexico.

It serves as a coat, blanket, bedspread, tablecloth or cape. It also decorates walls and floors, as a tapestry or carpet. Another use is to put it on the horse before climbing to the saddle.

=== Pulque bread ===
Pulque bread is a tradition deeply rooted in the town and is highly sought after by the people of Saltillo. Its preparation, based on wheat flour, water or milk, egg and, sometimes, lard is similar to that of other Mexican sweet breads. However, it differs by including pulque, which is a fermented drink obtained from the agave plant, as a fermentation agent. This gives it a characteristic flavor, sweetness and moisture. With this dough, pecan empanadas, chorreadas, muffins, braid bread, bishops, etc. are made. Although for many the city of Saltillo is synonymous with this bread, in reality its production constitutes, along that in a handful of neighboring towns, a relatively isolated focus of its production in Northeastern Mexico. Such is the case that outside of Saltillo, pulque bread can be found in the Mexican states of Hidalgo, Puebla, Querétaro, Mexico City, Oaxaca and, of course, Tlaxcala.

=== The Saltillo Rondalla of the UAAAN ===
The city of Saltillo is known for its rondalla, being the highest representative of the Rondallesque movement in Mexico for more than four decades. The 'Rondalla de Saltillo' went beyond transposing the established limits and creating its own style. It has multiple recordings and has toured several countries, it is characterized by using guitars, requintos, double bass, and vocals. The poet Marco Antonio Aguirre arrived at La Rondalla de Saltillo in 1966 and wrote his story with tours, and 30 recorded albums.

== Sports ==
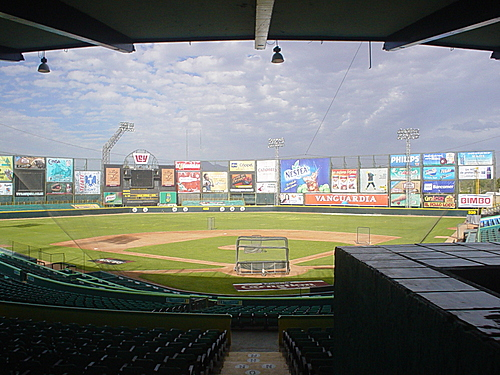
Francisco I. Madero Ballpark

Saltillo is a city with a long baseball tradition. In fact, some sources indicate that the sport began to be practiced in town at the end of the 19th century. However, its representative team, the Saraperos de Saltillo, did not arrive in the Mexican Baseball League until 1970. They had their origins in a dinner held by the members of the Pro-Works Committee of the Saltillo Cathedral, whose president was Mr. Jorge Torres Casso. They currently hold three championships, in 1980, 2009 and 2010, and eight division titles, in 1971, 1972, 1973, 1988, 2004, 2005, 2009 and 2010.

Other professional clubs based in Saltillo are:

Club	Sport	Founded	League	Venue
Dinos Saltillo	American football	2016	LFA	Estadio Olímpico Francisco I. Madero
Saltillo F.C.	Football	2019	Serie A de México	Estadio Olímpico Francisco I. Madero
Saltillo Soccer F.C.	Football	1995	Liga TDP	Estadio Olímpico Francisco I. Madero

Other sporting events, including basketball, boxing, lucha libre and ice hockey take place in Centro de Convenciones Arena Saltillo.

== Transportation ==
Saltillo Metropolitan Area air traffic is served by Plan de Guadalupe International Airport. It takes 15 minutes to get from downtown Saltillo to the airport. It has several cargo airline flights per day, but no passenger flights. There is a comprehensive bus system in Saltillo along with many taxis.

== Sister cities ==
The following are sister cities of Saltillo:

- (United States) Austin
- (United States) Canton
- Guatemala City
- (United States) Lansing
- (Cuba) Holguín
- (Mexico) Tlaxcala City
- (Canada) Windsor

== Notable people ==
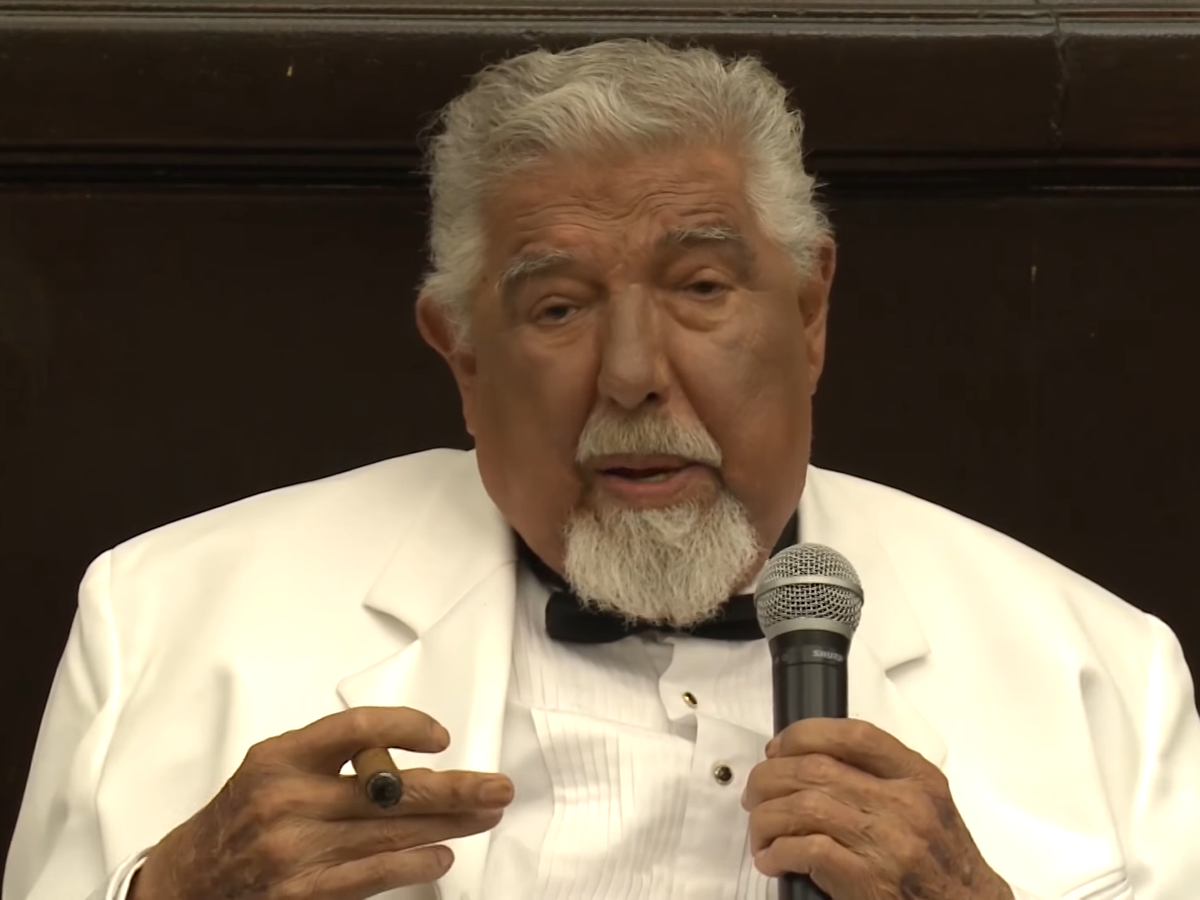
Rubén Aguirre

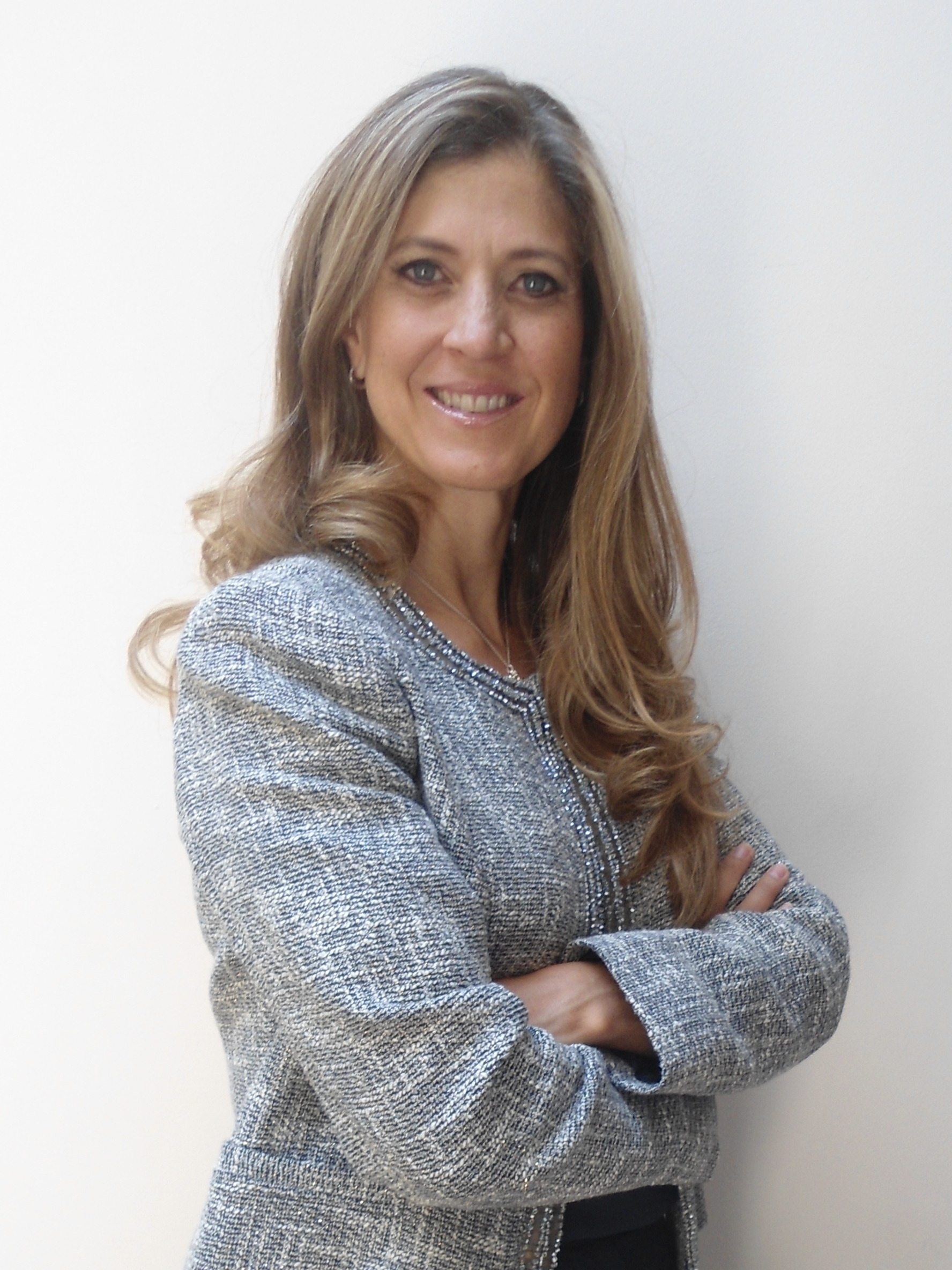
Karla Wheelock

During the twentieth century the city received the nickname of "the Athens of Mexico" for its large number of prominent intellectuals.

- Manuel Acuña, 19th-century Mexican writer. He focused on poetry, but also wrote some novels and plays.
- Rubén Aguirre, actor best remembered for his portrayal of Professor Jirafales in the television show El Chavo del Ocho.
- Vito Alessio Robles, military officer, engineer, writer, journalist, diplomat, and academic who participated in the Mexican Revolution.
- Pedro Arce, professional footballer.
- Carlos Bee, former U.S. Representative from Texas, son of Hamilton Bee, great-grandson of Thomas Bee.
- Ernesto Boardman, competitive archer, gold medalist at the 2015 Pan American Games.
- Humberto Elizondo, film and television actor.
- Eulalio Gutiérrez, president of Mexico from November 1914 to January 1915
- Louis Febre, composer, best known for his work on the television series Smallville.
- Roque González Garza, Mexican general and acting president of the Republic from January to June 1915.
- Magda Guzmán, actress.
- Rosario Ibarra, activist and prominent figure in Mexican politics, presidential candidate in 1982 and 1988.
- Checo Marrero, Engineer, Master in Finance, golfer and father of Lencho.
- Brissia Mayagoitiae, singer.
- José Narro Robles, former director of the Faculty of Medicine of the National Autonomous University of Mexico.
- Abril Rodríguez, beauty contestant
- Andrés Soler, Golden Age of Mexican cinema actor.
- Fernando Soler, film actor, director, screenwriter, and producer.
- Julio Torri, writer and teacher who formed part of the Ateneo de la Juventud.
- Karla Wheelock, mountaineer, writer, and lecturer, first Iberoamerican woman to climb the Seven Summits.
