= San Esteban de Nueva Tlaxcala =

Coordinates: 25.422°N 101.002°W

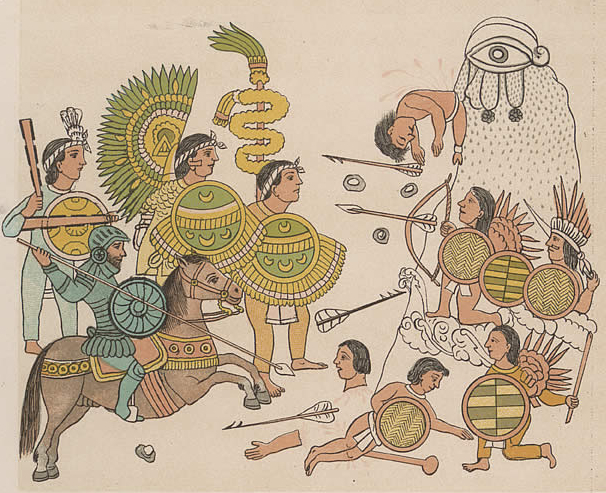
Tlaxcalans and a Spaniard (left) fighting against Chichimecas.

San Esteban de Nueva Tlaxcala was a Tlaxcalan municipality in what is now the Mexican state of Coahuila. San Esteban was the northernmost of the six Tlaxcalan colonies established in 1591 at the behest of the Viceroy of New Spain, Luis de Velasco; its founders came from Tizatlan. In 1834, San Esteban was merged into the adjoining city of Saltillo.

On the sparsely settled northeastern frontier of Mexico, menaced by hostile Indigenous people (Indians), the Tlaxcalans were allies of the Spanish settlers against the Indigenous of the region, but also stood apart with an independent society. San Esteban was often in legal controversies with the Spanish settlers of Saltillo.

== History ==
San Esteban was established as part of a strategy by the Spanish government to end the long-running and destructive Chichimeca War (1550-1590) and to gain control of its northeastern borderlands. The Spanish decided to resettle 400 Tlaxcalan families in the conflicted areas. The Tlaxcalans were Christians and loyal allies of the Spanish. The Tlaxcalans would help the Spanish defend their northern border and pacify the Chichimeca tribes by "soft and peaceful means," introducing them to Christianity and Spanish culture and turning them from nomadic hunter-gatherers into sedentary farmers.

The 400 Tlaxcalan families were resettled in six different places, including the struggling Spanish settlement of Saltillo. The resettlement was preceded by a long negotiation between the Spanish authorities and Tlaxcalan leaders. The Tlaxcalans extracted a number of concessions, the most important of which was that their communities would be autonomous, independent of local governments, self-ruled, and answerable only to the office of the Viceroy in Mexico City. Other concessions they received were recognition of the Tlaxcalans as hidalgos ("gentlemen," an inheritable status), exemption from tribute and forced labor (the encomienda system), and a prohibition of encroachment on their lands by livestock owned by non-Tlaxcalans. The Tlaxcalans were also given the right to bear arms as if they were Spaniards and to ride "saddled and bridled" horses (also as if they were Spaniards). San Esteban would thus be "an independent municipality with special privileges that placed it in the netherworld between the Spanish and the indigenous."

In July 1591, 71 Tlaxcalan families and 16 bachelors arrived in Saltillo and the town of San Esteban was founded on the western side of the Spanish settlement and separated from the Spaniards only by an irrigation canal. Only 20 Spanish "vecinos" (property owning householders) lived in Saltillo. Their numbers were diminishing and the settlement was in danger of being extinguished by Chichimeca attacks so the Tlaxcalans were greeted with enthusiasm. The Tlaxcalans armed and equipped their men to assist in defending Saltillo, plus providing a small group, usually 8 to 10 men, to join the Spaniards on expeditions to suppress the nomadic tribes living near Saltillo. Although the Chichimeca War had mostly ended, other nomadic tribes, such as the Toboso, in northern Mexico continued to be hostile to the Spaniards.

The Tlaxcalans had been tasked by the Viceroy with helping "civilize" the Chichimeca people. Several hundred formerly-hostile Guachichils were resettled near San Esteban on lands given them as part of a peace agreement. By 1677, San Esteban claimed the Guachichil land as their own, declaring the descendants of the Guachichils as "pure Tlaxcalan." The population of San Estaban by then was 1,750. Throughout the more than 200 year history of San Esteban, the Tlaxcalans would strive to maintain their ethnic purity, both out of pride and a desire to keep the privileges granted them in 1591. They married mostly within their own community, and they retained their native language of Nahuatl, as witnessed by the large number of Nahuatl documents, especially wills, preserved from the 17th century.

== Tlaxcalan colonies ==
San Esteban sent colonists to the nearby settlement of Parras in 1598 and in the 17th and 18th centuries sent colonists to a dozen other settlements menaced by hostile Indians. The contingents of Tlaxcalans sent to help defend these places and pacify the local Indians usually numbered 10 to 14 families. Thus, Tlaxcalans were widely distributed along the northeastern frontier of Mexico. The Spanish government provided the colonists with tools and seeds and sometimes paid them cash for their collaboration. Tlaxcalan colonists continued to have the privileges they enjoyed in San Esteban de Nueva Tlaxcala.

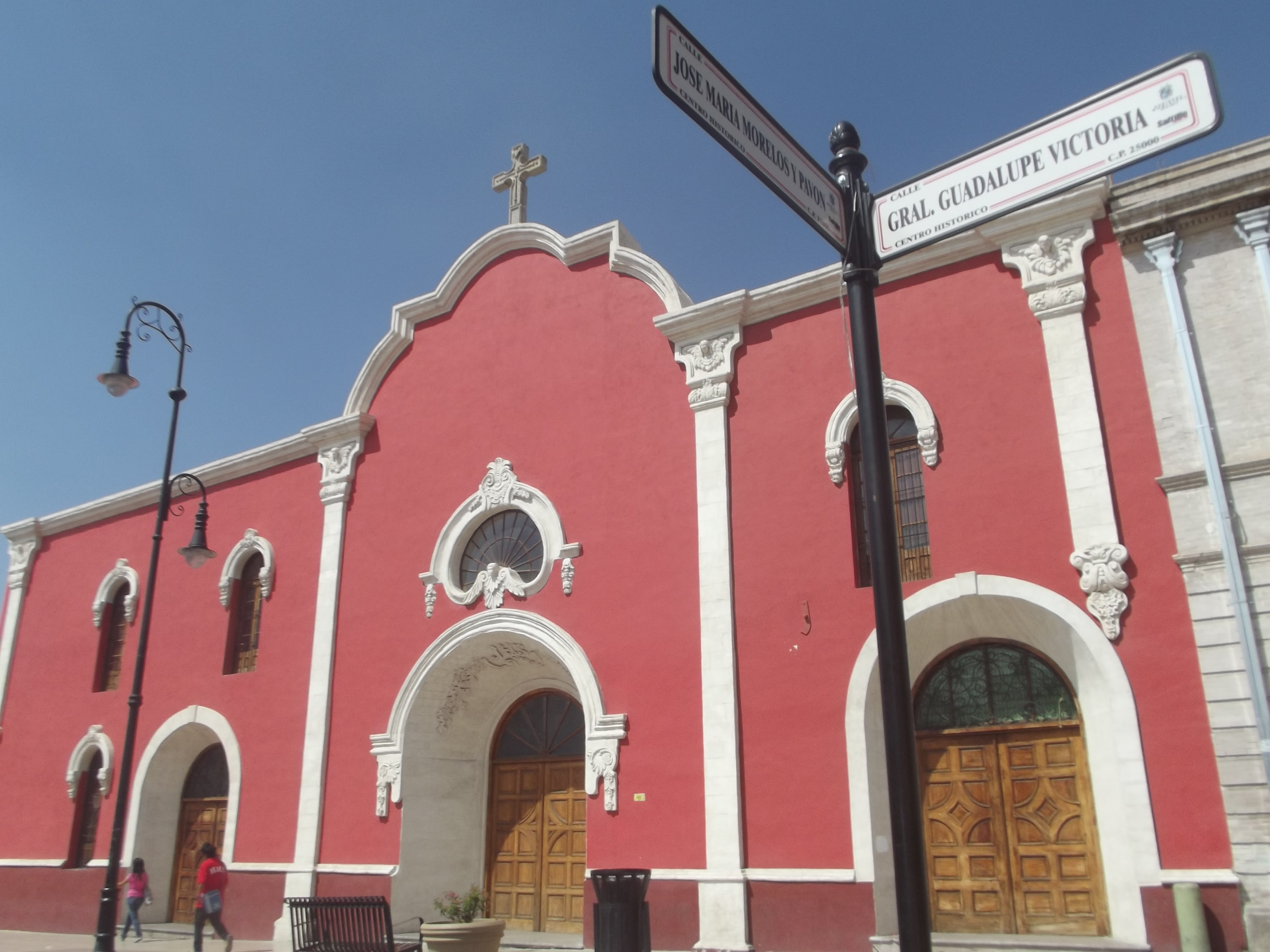
The San Esteban Cathedral is the oldest in Saltillo.

== Overtaken by events ==
A Spanish priest "described San Esteban residents in 1777 as industrious, abhorring laziness and applying themselves enthusiastically to their agricultural labors, and responsible for producing the bulk of vegetables and fruits consumed in neighboring Saltillo." Nevertheless, an increasing non-Tlaxcalan population of northeastern Mexico, Indian hostility, drought, and disease began to erode the independence of San Estaban in the 1780s and afterwards. San Estaban steadily lost political and legal battles with the Spanish authorities of Saltillo, and began to struggle more for survival than retaining its traditional privileges and rights.

A reorganization of the colonial government in the 1780s resulted in San Esteban losing much of its autonomy and right of self government. The traditional rights of San Estaban were further eroded after 1821 when Mexican gained independence from Spain. In 1827, San Esteban's name was changed and in 1834 it was merged into the municipality of Saltillo.
