= Serranía de Zapalinamé =

Mountain range in northeastern Mexico

- Sierra de Zapalinamé
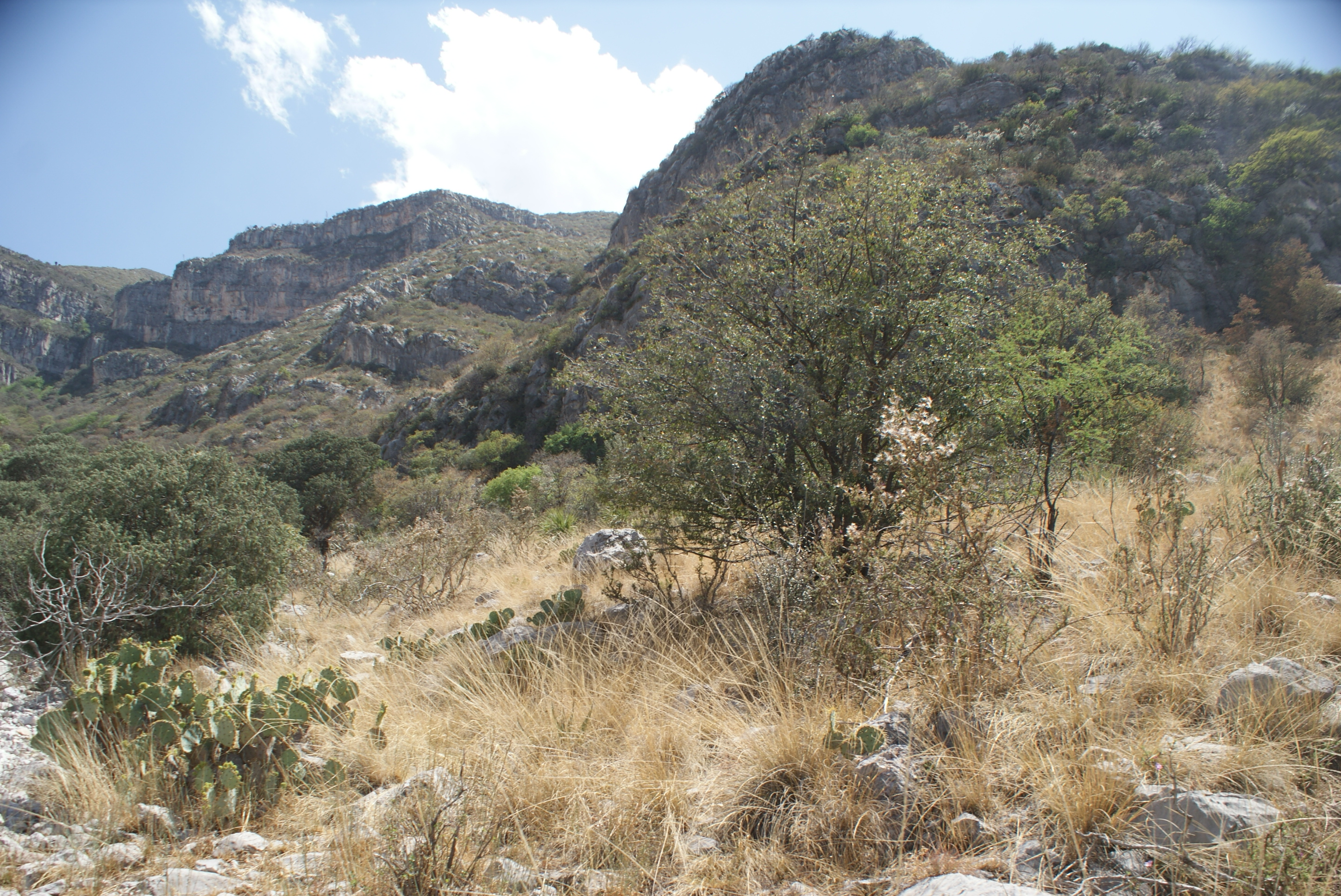
- Camino de Cuatro in the Sierra de Zapalinamé

- Location within Mexico
- Location: Coahuila, Mexico
- Nearest city: Saltillo
- Coordinates: 25°20′11″N 100°55′43″W
- Area: 253.74 km^{2} (97.97 sq mi)
- Designation: ecological conservation
- Designated: 1996

The Serranía de Zapalinamé, also known as the Sierra de Zapalinamé, is a mountain range and protected area of northeastern Mexico. The city of Saltillo lies immediately north of the mountains.

The range is a westward extension of the Sierra Madre Oriental. The highest peak in the range is El Penitiente at 3,140 meters elevation.

Higher elevations are home to pine–oak forests. The lower slopes are dry shrublands. The Serranía is in the upper basin of the San Juan River, and its forests protect downstream water quality and reduce flood risk.

The Serranía de Zapalinamé was designated an ecological conservation area in 1996 by the state government of Coahuila. The protected area covers 253.74 km^{2}.
