= Jimulco =

Protected area in Mexico

Sierra y Cañón de Jimulco
- Location: Coahuila, Mexico
- Nearest city: Torreón
- Area: 610.18 km^{2} (235.59 sq mi)
- Designation: Natural protected area and ecological reserve
- Designated: 2003
- Governing body: Torreón Municipality

The Reserva Ecológica Municipal Sierra y Cañón de Jimulco is a protected natural area in Torreón, Coahuila, Mexico. Jimulco has a high mountain range of over 10,000 ft, a riparian area formed by the Aguanaval River, an endorrheic basin and an extensive valley with the characteristic flora and fauna of the Chihuahuan Desert. El Cañon del Realito and El Cañon de la Cabeza are two small canyons of great beauty formed by the Aguanaval.

The summit of Sierra de Jimulco is covered in pine-oak forest. The riparian area has old Montezuma bald cypresses, willows and cottonwoods. Cougars and bobcats move from the mountain footholds to the riparian forest. More than 120 species of birds have been observed in the area including mountain bluebirds, red-shouldered hawks and golden eagles. Characteristic vegetation of the Chihuahuan desert includes lechuguilla, ocotillo, cholla cactus, and prickly pear cactus. An endemic subspecies of Agave victoriae-reginae is common in the sheer cliffs of the nearby mountains.

Extensive mesquite patches still survive in this protected area but are being cut at an alarming rate to make charcoal. Other menaces to the area are the intended construction of a large dam at Cañon de la Cabeza, overpumping of groundwater and illegal hunting.

The reserve was established in 2003, and has an area of 610.18 km^{2}.
