= Matamoros =

Matamoros is a Spanish surname and place name meaning "Moor killer". It may refer to:

== Music ==
- "Matamoros", a song by The Afghan Whigs from Do to the Beast
- "Matamoros Banks", a song by Bruce Springsteen from Devils & Dust
- Matamoros Querido, a 1971 album by Rigo Tovar
  - "Mi Matamoros Querido", a song on Matamoros Querido

== People ==
- Carlos Matamoros Franco (born 1966), Ecuadorian chess grandmaster
- Mariano Matamoros (1770–1814), a liberal priest and insurgent active during the Mexican War of Independence
- Miguel Matamoros (1894–1971), a Cuban musician and composer
  - Trio Matamoros, Cuban trova group founded by Miguel Matamoros
- Saint James Matamoros, 'the Moor-slayer', Spanish mythological figure

== Places ==
=== Mexico ===
- Matamoros, Tamaulipas, the largest city known as Matamoros, also called Heroica Matamoros
  - Matamoros Municipality, Tamaulipas, the municipality it is located in
  - Matamoros–Brownsville metropolitan area, transnational conurbation along the Mexico–U.S. border
  - Matamoros Cathedral
- Matamoros Municipality, Chihuahua
  - Mariano Matamoros, Chihuahua, town and municipal seat
- Matamoros Municipality, Coahuila
  - Matamoros, Coahuila, city and municipal seat
- General Mariano Matamoros Airport, an airport located in Temixco, Morelos
- Tlacolula de Matamoros, city in Oaxaca
- Izúcar de Matamoros, city in Puebla
- Landa de Matamoros, city in Querétaro
- Matamoros (Mexibús), a BRT station in Ecatepec de Morelos, State of Mexico

=== Spain ===
- Valle de Matamoros, municipality in the province of Badajoz

== See also ==
- Matamoras (disambiguation)
