= Matamoros Municipality =

There are several municipalities in Mexico called Matamoros:

- Matamoros Municipality, Chihuahua
- Matamoros Municipality, Coahuila
- Matamoros Municipality, Tamaulipas

See also

- Matamoros (disambiguation)
