= Comarca Lagunera =

Comarca Lagunera Metropolitan Area
- Metropolitan Area
- Zona Metropolitana de Comarca Lagunera (Spanish)
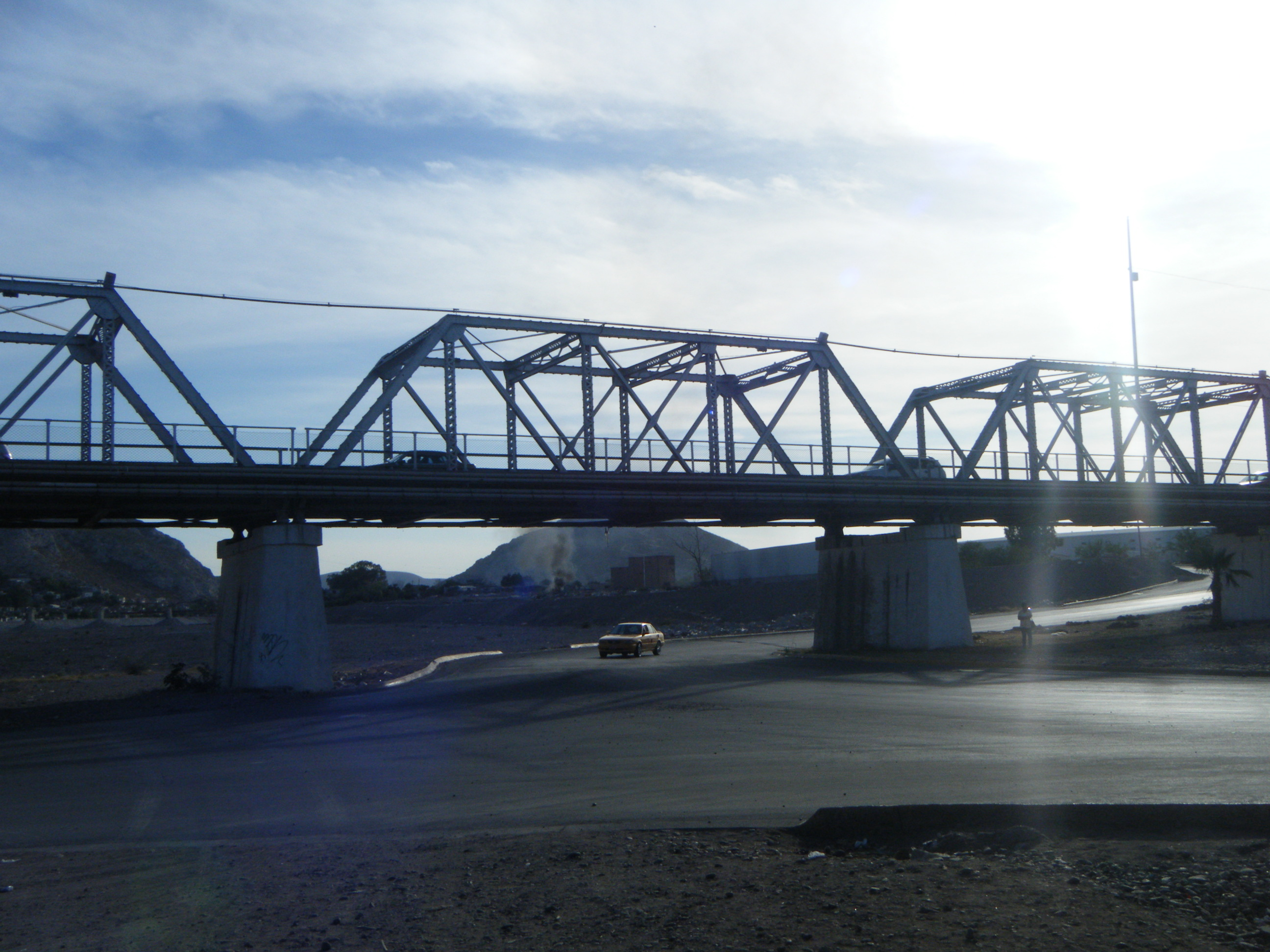
- Puente Plateado which joins Torreón in Coahuila and Gómez Palacio in Durango

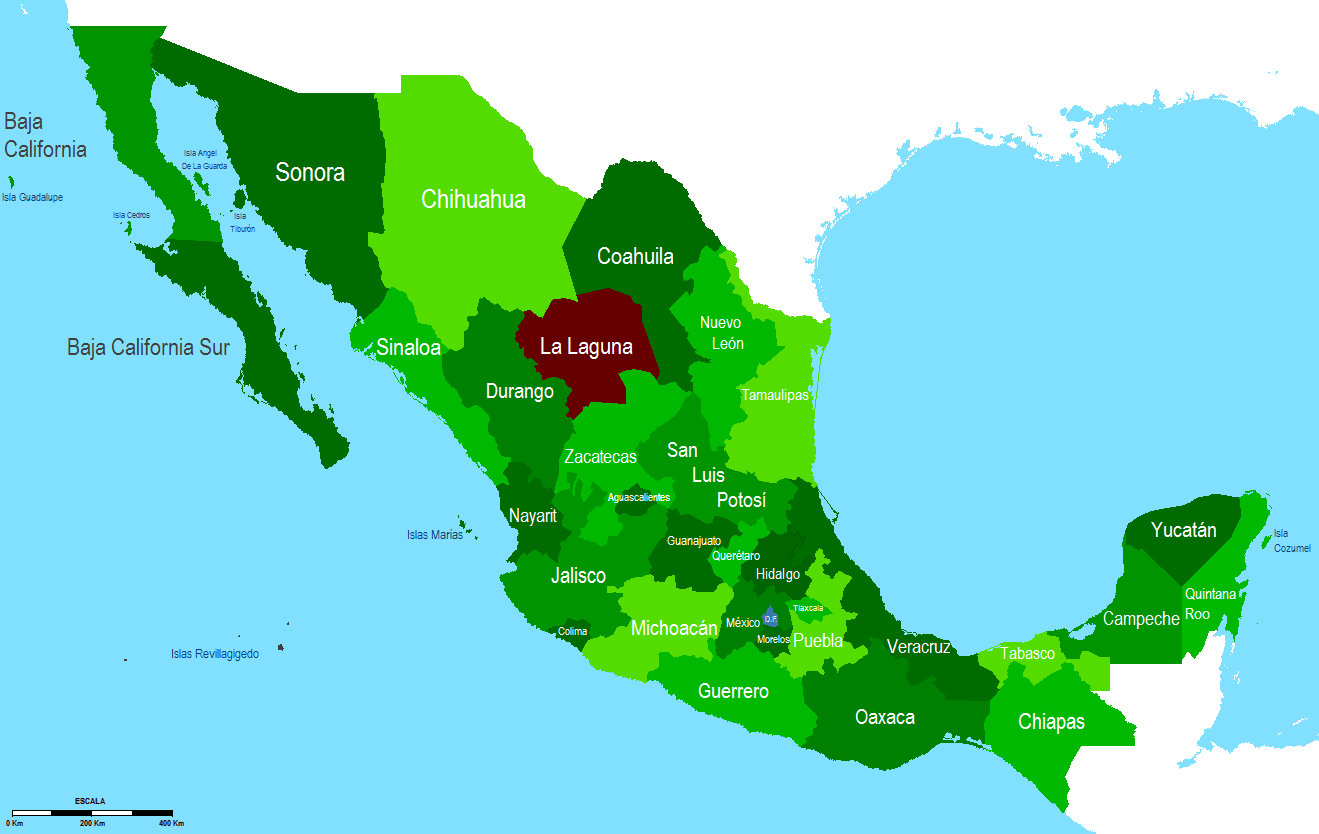
- Map of Comarca Lagunera

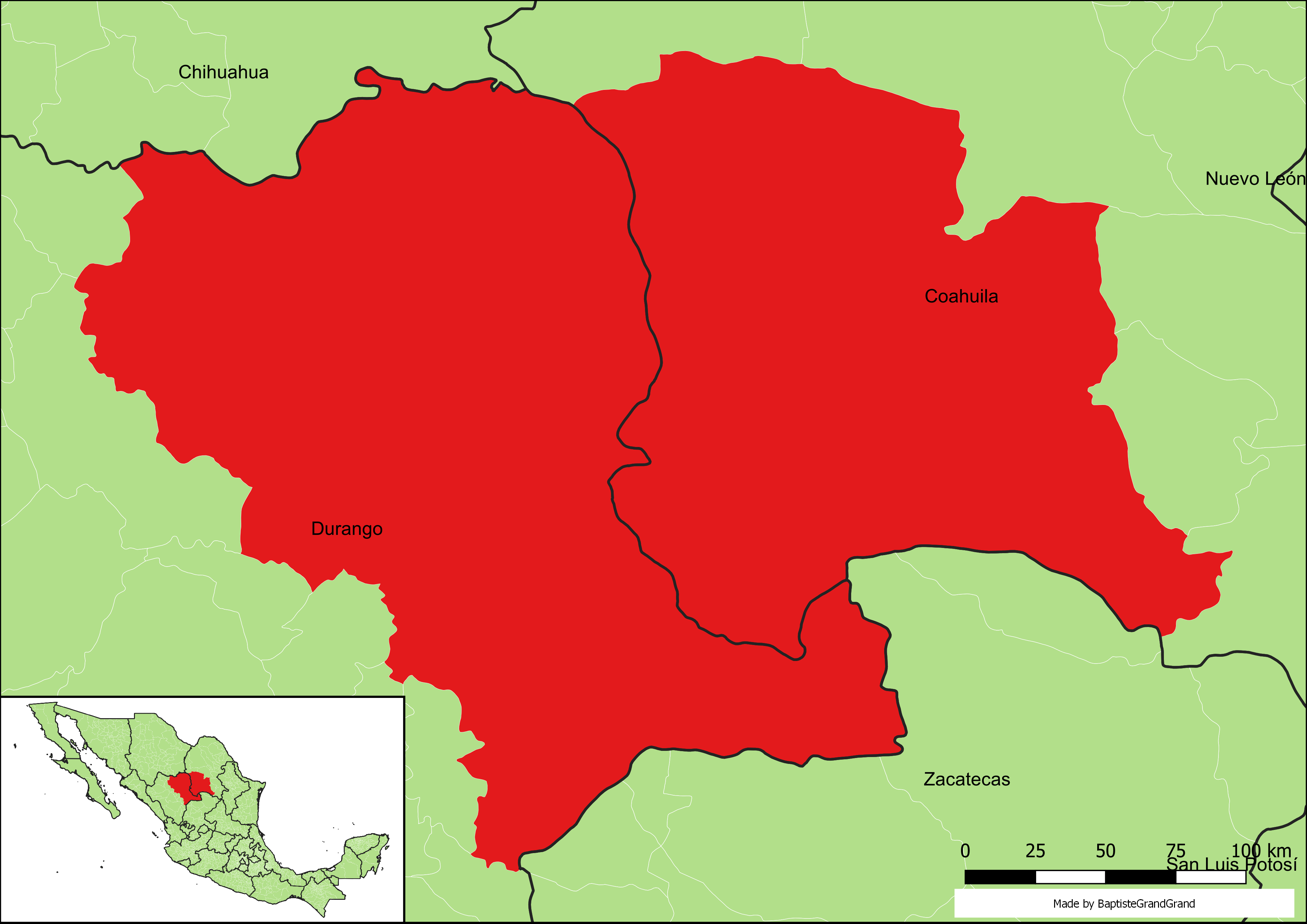
Comarca Lagunera between Durango and Coahuila
City of Torreón / Ciudad de Torreón
Zona metropolitana de La Laguna
- Coordinates: 24°22′N 102°22′W
- Country: Mexico
- Largest city: Torreón
- Other cities: Gómez Palacio; Lerdo
- States: Coahuila; Durango

Area
  - Metropolitan Area: 17,330 sq mi (44,900 km^{2})
- Elevation: 3,670 ft (1,120 m)

Population
  - Metropolitan Area: 1,488,613
  - Density: 85.90/sq mi (33.17/km^{2})
  - Urban: 1,152,053
  - Rural: 336,620
- Time zone: UTC−06:00 (Zona Centro)
- Telephone area codes: +52 (Country) 871 and 872
- Airport: Francisco Sarabia International Airport (TRC)

The Comarca Lagunera or La Comarca de la Laguna (In english: Lagoon Shire) is a region of northern Mexico occupying large portions of the states of Durango and Coahuila, with rich soils produced by periodic flooding of the Nazas and Aguanaval rivers. Neither river drains into either the Pacific Ocean or the Gulf of Mexico, but rather they created a series of inland lakes. The region was developed for large-scale irrigated cotton agriculture. During the Mexican Revolution, the region was the site of fierce fighting. Following the military phase of the Revolution, the region was part of the agrarian reform under President Lázaro Cárdenas. The dam named for Cárdenas now controls flooding of the rivers, but the groundwater resources are no longer recharged as a result. It is the 8th largest metropolitan area in Mexico.

== Geography ==
=== Municipalities ===
The Comarca Lagunera is formed by 15 municipios; 5 in Coahuila (Torreón Municipality, Matamoros Municipality, San Pedro Municipality, Francisco I. Madero Municipality, Viesca Municipality) and 10 in Durango (Gómez Palacio Municipality, Lerdo Municipality, Tlahualilo Municipality, Mapimí Municipality, Rodeo Municipality, Nazas Municipality, San Juan de Guadalupe Municipality, San Luis del Cordero Municipality, General Simón Bolívar, San Pedro del Gallo Municipality).

=== Territory ===
It covers an area of 44,887 km^{2} (17,331 sq mi) out of which 22,031 km^{2} (8,506 sq mi) belong to Coahuila and 25,856 km^{2} (9,983 sq mi) to Durango, which makes it 2.5 percent of the national area.

=== Borders ===
It borders north with the state of Chihuahua, and with Sierra Mojada Municipality and Cuatrociénegas Municipality of Coahuila, to the west with Indé Municipality and Hidalgo Municipality in Durango, to the southwest with the state of Zacatecas and to the east with Parras Municipality in Coahuila. This polygon is located in the north-central part of Mexico, between the parallels 24° 22' and 26° 23' North and meridians 102° 22' and 104° 47' West in the southernmost part of the Bolsón de Mapimí. The average altitude of the region is of 1,139 meters (3,737 ft).

=== Hydrology ===
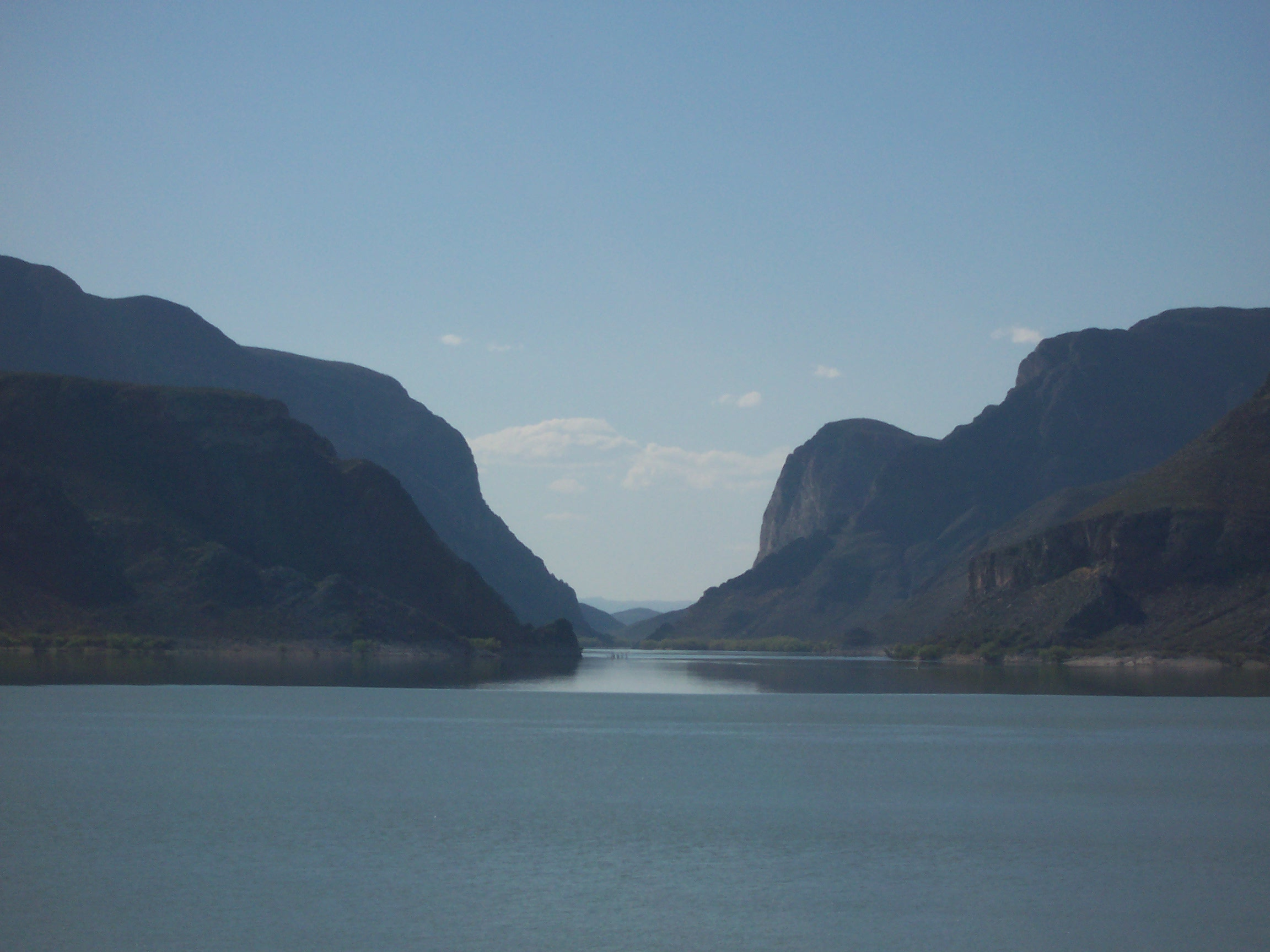
Rio Nazas

The Comarca Lagunera is subject to periodic flooding due to the overflowing of its principal rivers.

==== Nazas River ====
The Nazas River, average flow of 1,900 cubic meters per second, is formed from the merging of the Sextín River and the Ramos River. In its transit towards the Laguna de Mayrán it is contained in the Lázaro Cárdenas dam (3,336 million cubic meters). In its course it receives the flows of the Vizcaíno, Peñón, San Juan, Naitcha and Cuencamé creeks, and finally stops at the Francisco Zarco Dam (436 million cubic meters).

==== Aguanaval River ====
The Aguanaval River, which has an average flow of 600 cubic meters per second, is formed from the fusion of the Saín Alto River and Trujillo River in Zacatecas. It receives the flows of the Reyes, Santiago and Mazamitote creeks.

==== Other ====
There are other important hydrologic components in the Comarca Lagunera region. The Benjamín Ortega Cantero dam in the municipio of Mapimí, the Francisco González de la Vega dam in Rodeo, the Los Naranjos dam in Simón Bolívar and the Cinco de Mayo dam in San Pedro del Gallo. Also, the Mayrán and Viesca lagoons are big natural dams that constitute dry beds at the moment, and are unable to be filled due to the dams located in the Nazas River for the Mayrán lagoon and the city of Matamoros being in the Aguanaval River's flood path.

=== Orography ===
The region is conformed by a large and truncated mountain range, in which several prominent features can be seen constituted by sedimentary rock from the Mesozoic, where important marble and other non-ferrous minerals are exploited. The most important features within the Comarca Lagunera are the Sierra de Jimulco (altitude of 3,120 m), the Sierra del Rosario (altitude of 2,820 m), and the Sierra de Tlahualilo (altitude of 2,200 m).

== History ==
In the 1980s, proposals began being made that Comarca Lagunera become Mexico's 33rd state, separating from Coahuila and Durango. In the late 1980s, three unsuccessful attempts were made in Congress to approve Comarca Laguna's statehood. Discussions have continued for decades, with no progress, until 2013, when a project named ELLA (Estado de La Laguna) presented the government with an updated proposal, arguing that statehood would help alleviate the issues of drought and poverty that plague the area. They say that the states of Durango and Coahuila provide a disproportionately small share of funding compared to what the region provides in taxes, labor and production. The group gathered over 500,000 petition signatures in support of the proposal. In January 2014, the Mexican government responded, agreeing to take the proposal under consideration.

== Climate ==
It has average heat throughout the year, with an average temperature of 22 °C (72 °F) and extreme dryness, with an average rainfall of 300 mm (12 in). There is an average of 22 cold days a year, with temperatures ranging lows of 0 °C (32 °F) and highs of 40 °C (104 °F).

== Population ==
The economic rise of the Comarca Lagunera is centralized in an urban center formed by the cities of Lerdo, Gómez Palacio, and Torreón. This major settlement has, as of 2000, a population of 1,249,442, out of which 912,822 are located in the urban area and 336,620 in rural settlements, making it the 8th largest metropolitan area in Mexico .

== Economy ==
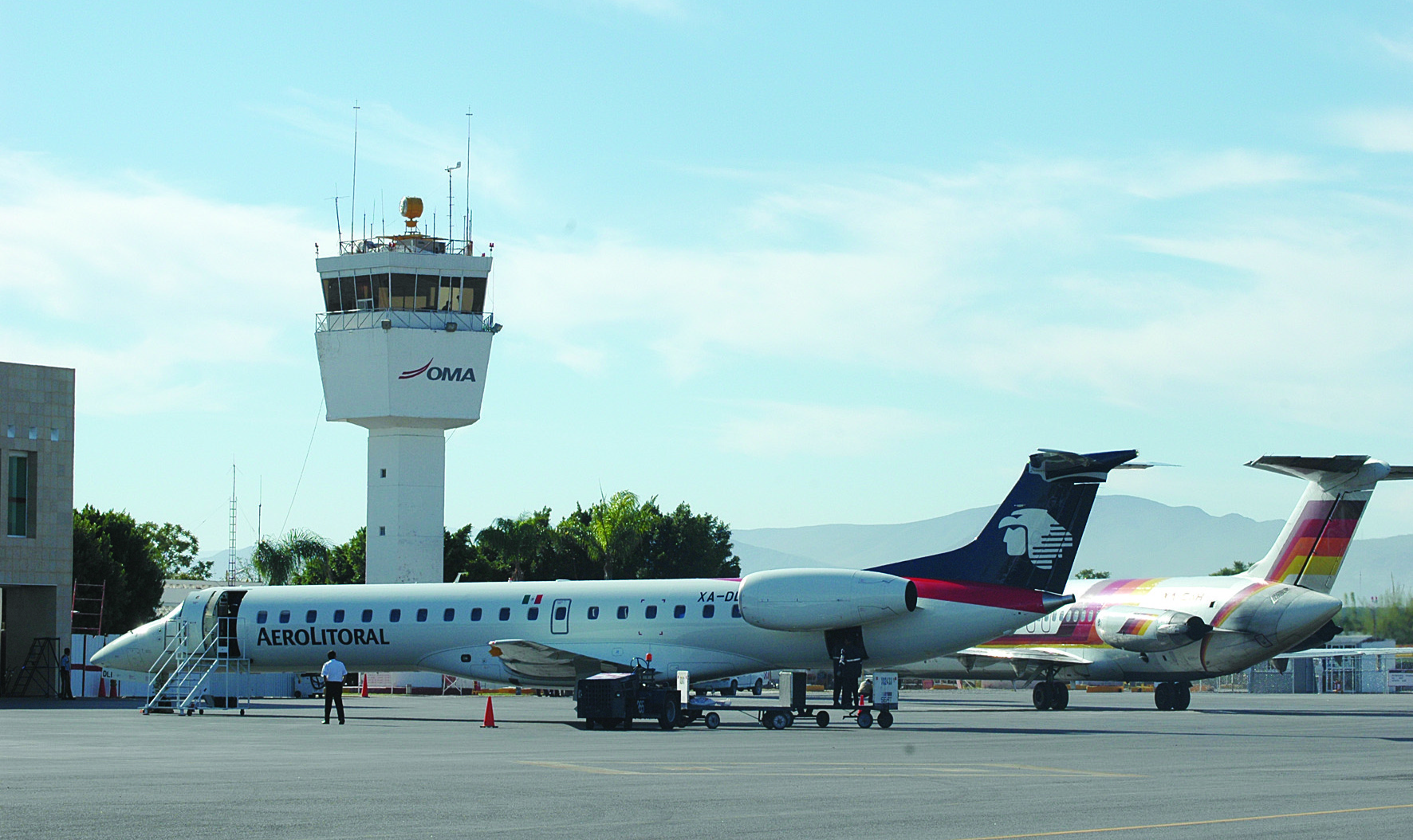
Airport Francisco Sarabia in Torreón

The Comarca Lagunera is Mexico's most important milk producer with a 14 percent of the national production of milk, 3.6 million liters of milk a day. And within the city of Torreón lies the largest silver refinery of the world, Met-Mex Peñoles. The Comarca is an important producer of raw materials and finished products: among which are cement, fertilizers, non-ferrous metals, marble, milk-derivates, among others.

One of the most important activities is that of the maquiladora (assembly plant) industry of clothing, car parts and electrical components.

== Education ==
The region has a total of 32 professional studies centers, universities, community colleges, and technical institutes. The most important in the region are the Universidad Autónoma de Coahuila, the Tecnológico de Monterrey Campus Laguna, the Iberoamerican University Torreón, Universidad Autónoma de la Laguna, Universidad La Salle and Instituto Tecnológico de la Laguna.

== See also ==
- Metropolitan Areas of Mexico
