= Gómez Palacio, Durango =

City in the Mexican state of Durango

- City
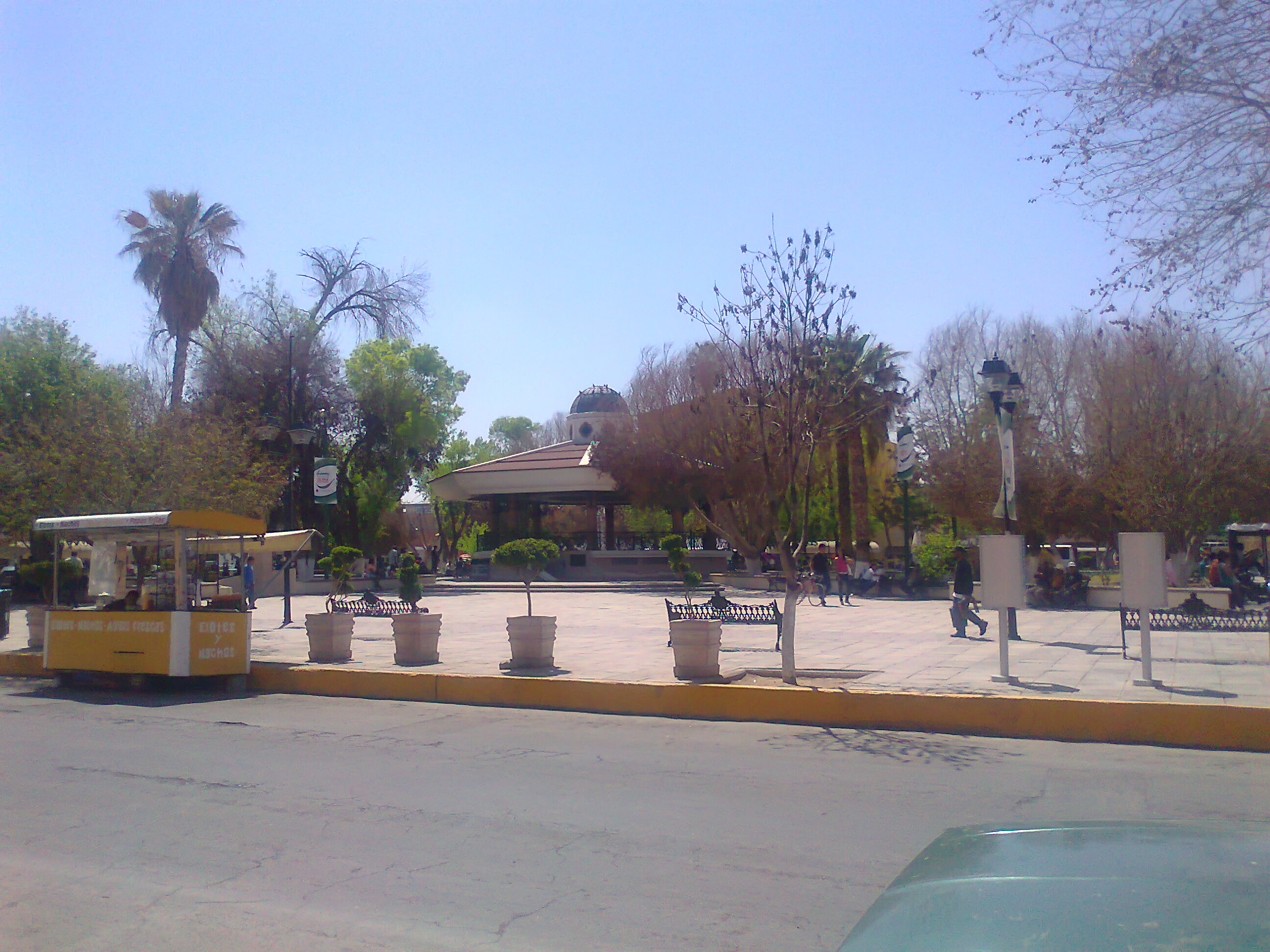
- Main Square of Gómez Palacio

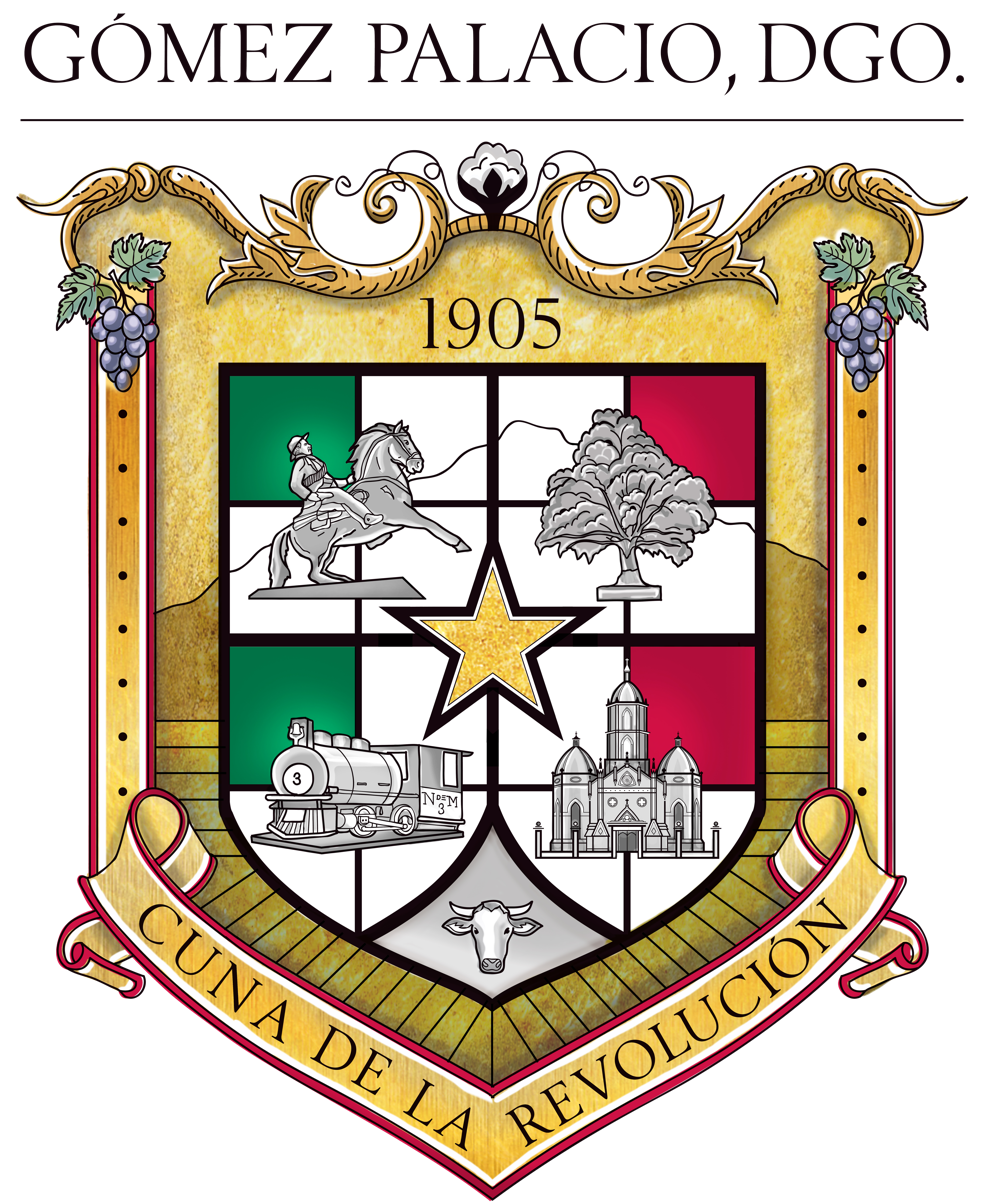
- Coat of arms
- Motto(s): Capital Industrial de La Comarca Lagunera (Industrial Capital of the Comarca Lagunera)
- Location in Mexico Gómez Palacio, Durango (Mexico)
- Country: Mexico
- State: Durango
- Municipality: Gómez Palacio

Population (2010)
  - Total: 327,985
- Website: Official website

Gómez Palacio is a city and its surrounding municipality in northeastern Durango, Mexico, adjacent to the border of the state of Coahuila. The city is named in honor of former Durango governor, Francisco Gómez Palacio y Bravo.

As of 2010, the city of Gómez Palacio had a population of 327,985, up from 304,515 as of 2005, making it the state's second-largest community. The municipality (including the city) population was 327,985. The municipality's area is 990.2 square kilometres (382.3 sq mi). The municipality and city are part of a large metropolitan area called the Comarca Lagunera Metropolitan Area, which includes Torreón Municipality and Matamoros Municipality in Coahuila, as well as Lerdo Municipality in Durango. The metropolitan area had an official population of 1,215,817 persons in 2010.

== History ==
From the first half of the seventeenth century, the land within the triangle formed by San Juan de Casta (now Leon Guzman), Santiago de Mapimí (Mapimí) and Santa Maria de las Parras (Parras), formed part of the property of the Marquis of Aguayo and named Hacienda de San Lorenzo de la Laguna.

In 1848, after several modifications, the lands were purchased by Juan Ignacio Jimenez, from Cuencame. The purchase included the entrance of the river Nazas (Cañon de Calabazas), where he built Calabazas Dam and a system of canals and ditches to irrigate the lands of the Haciendas of Sacramento, Noé, Santa Rosa, Torreón and San Ignacio.

In 1880, his successors sold these properties to one of his managers, Spanish farmer Santiago Lavín Cuadra. In 1885, Lavín drafted the blocks that would be the beginning of the city. He created a public square in Hidalgo Street (now Independencia) and offered free land to those who agreed to plant trees to give the region a different look. The first deed was recorded September 15, 1885, now considered the city's founding date. Lavín named the town in honor of Francisco Gomez Palacio for his many achievements as governor, federal deputy, Secretary of the Interior and as an official in the government of Benito Juárez.

The city was officially recognized by the State Congress December 21, 1905, by decree number 60.

== Early industries ==
On June 25, 1887, a legal society was formed that gave rise to La Jabonera (The Soap), considered the city's most important industry. Another company was the spinning and weaving La Amistad (Friendship) that received a land grant to set up their factory. Another was La Union (The Union), a shoe factory that became successful enough to compete with imported European and U.S. premium brands.

== Economy ==
Upon founding the city, Cuadra ceded land to the Mexican Central Railroad so that it could build a roundhouse and workshops, with the aim of expanding it to an entire railroad terminal. In 1907, a U.S. company transferred its Jimulco facilities to Gómez Palacio and terminals for passenger and cargo trains were established. Over time, about 2,000 workers arrived. The trains were operated by U.S. personnel, who gradually trained Mexican workers to operate the trains. Mexican workers occupied vacancies left by departing Americans and by 1910, all positions were filled by Mexicans.

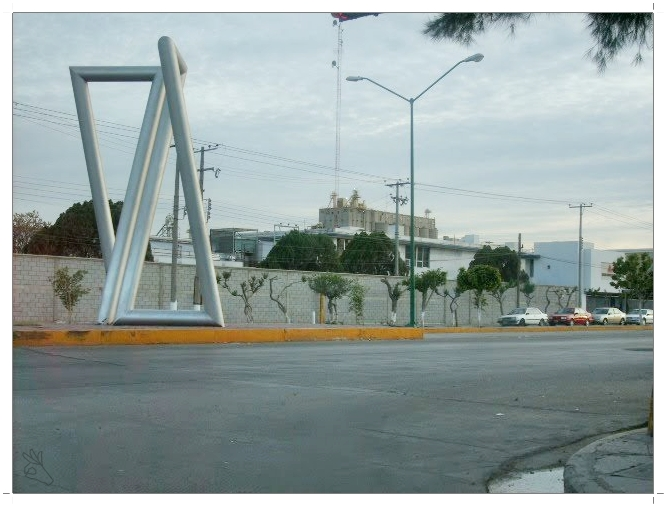
Industrial area.

The city became one of the largest railroad centers in the country, boosting the already thriving development. The outbreak of the revolutionary struggle caused the closure of many industries and businesses, especially affecting manual laborers. For many years, the railroad was the mainstay of the local economy. The roundhouse, workshops and terminals were changed to Torreon, Coahuila.

The installation of the Francke power plant in 1930 gave considerable impetus to industrialization.

The first agricultural strike in the region occurred June 11, 1935, in the Hacienda of Manila, multiplying effects in other estates that resulted in the issuance of the decree of October 6, 1936, by which General Lázaro Cárdenas initiated the distribution of land to laborers throughout the Comarca Lagunera.

As the busiest economy in the region and state, the city contributed nearly 45% of GDP along with Ciudad Lerdo and over 55% with Laguna Region of Durango. Gómez Palacio hosts several industrial parks, including the newer Park Gómez Palacio Americas, Harrier Industrial Park with 588 companies and the Zone of International Connectivity, Laguna for international trade.

== Notable people ==
- Andrade El Idolo (born 1989), professional wrestler
- Ángel Azteca (1963–2007), professional wrestler
- Uriel Antuna (born 1997), professional footballer
- Manny Bañuelos (born 1991), Major League Baseball pitcher
- Blue Panther (born 1960), professional wrestler
- Gran Guerrero (born 1993), professional wrestler
- Jesús Mena (born 1968), former diver, bronze medalist at the 1988 Summer Olympics
- Cristian Mijares (born 1981), former professional boxer
- Desirée Monsiváis (born 1988), former professional footballer and TV commentator
- Juan Navarrete (born 1953), professional baseball player and manager, member of the Mexican Professional Baseball Hall of Fame
- Último Guerrero (born 1972), professional wrestler

== Sister City ==
Gómez Palacio has one sister city.:

- (United States) - South El Monte, California, USA
