= Gabriel Palmeros =

Mexican footballer (born 1977)

Personal information
- Full name: Gabriel Palmeros Valadéz
- Date of birth: December 2, 1977 (age 48)
- Place of birth: Puebla, Puebla, Mexico
- Height: 1.73 m (5 ft 8 in)
- Position: Defender

Senior career*
Years	Team	Apps	(Gls)
2001–2005	Santos Laguna	58	(0)
2005–2007	Jaguares de Chiapas	55	(0)
- * Club domestic league appearances and goals as of March 11, 2007

Gabriel Palmeros Valadéz (born December 2, 1977) is a former Mexican football (soccer) defender. He played for Santos Laguna (2001–2005) and Jaguares de Chiapas (2005–2007).

== Career ==
Born in Puebla, Puebla, Palmeros' family moved to Comarca Lagunera when he was very young. He began playing football with local side Santos Laguna, where he would make his Liga MX debut.
