= Candelaria Cave =

Archeological site in Mexico

- Cueva de la Candelaria (Spanish)
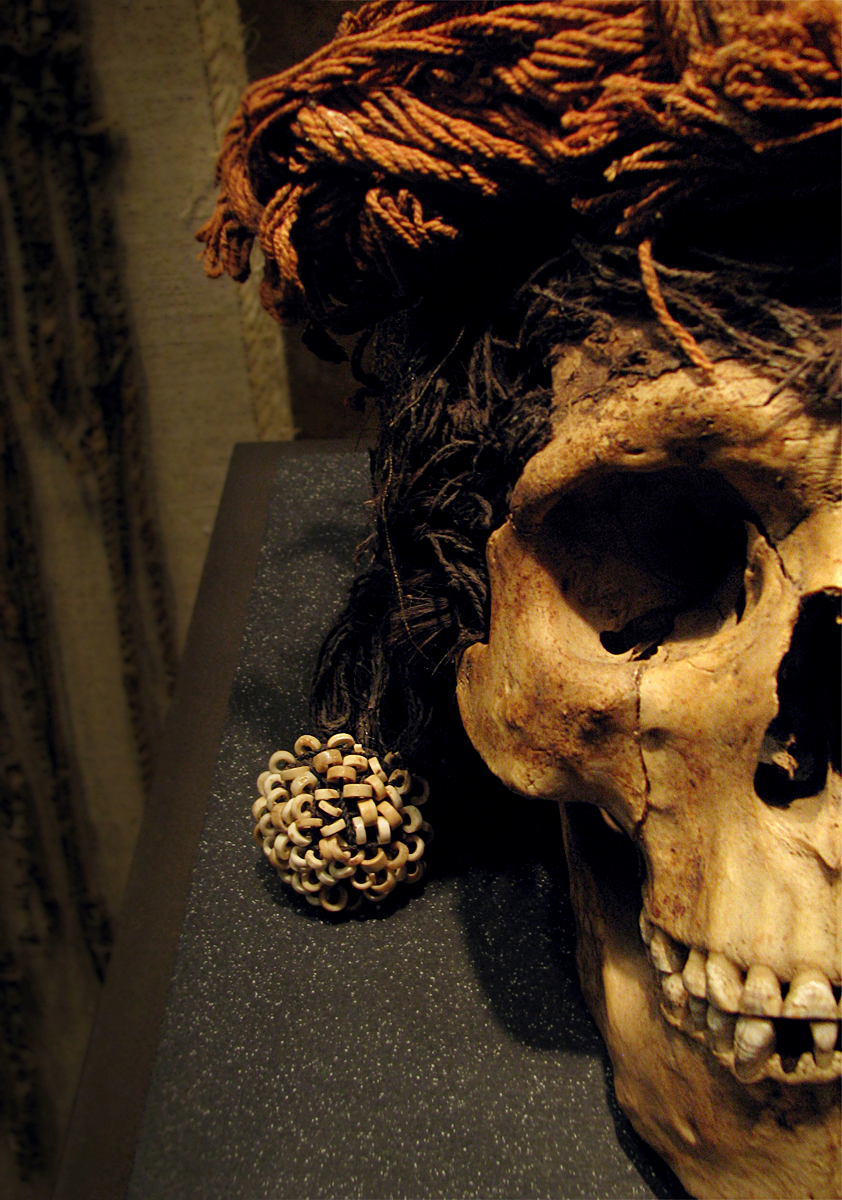
- Detail of a skull found in Cueva de la Candelaria. Wears a head ornament made from vegetal fibers and seashell beads. Currently displayed at INAH National Anthropology Museum.
- Interactive map of Candelaria Cave
- 25°25′16″N 100°57′40″W
- Periods: 1200 - 1500 CE. (Postclassical)
- Cultures: Chichimeca – Coahuilteca
- Location: Candelaria, Coahuila, Aridoamerica; Mexico

Cueva de la Candelaria (Candelaria Cave) is an archaeological site located the Mexican state of Coahuila. It is a cave that was used as cemetery by nomad visitors. Early site research was made in 1953 and there was a later season in 1954. As a result of these investigations, many materials were recovered and are kept by the National Institute of Anthropology and History (INAH).

Cueva de la Candelaria findings are interesting by the large amount of textiles found on this site. They constitute a source of important information about nomad Aridoamerica cultures. According to the researchers, the tissues style is very similar to baskets fabrication, but lack of stone tools artifacts such as the atlatl makes difficult the identification of Cueva de la Candelaria occupants.

State history mentions on a smaller scale to nomadic groups that inhabited this wide southern Aridoamerica region, these groups were generically called Chichimeca, but also have their specific names, such as the Coahuiltecos, Huachichiles, Irritilas and Tobosos.

Little is known about them, historical sources hardly speak of their customs, languages or dialects, or traditions, although some vestiges left for posterity are already known. Archaeological evidence displayed in caves show these were used as houses, as well as burial with tools, clothing and gifts have been discovered. Most popular sites are the Cueva de la Candelaria, La Espantosa y La Chuparrosa.

The Cueva de la Candelaria occupants used to bury their dead in packages containing not only the body but body ornaments made of natural fibre, leather, shells, and feathers, as well as other pieces of clothing and footwear. Everything is wrapped in a Cotton or cassava woven blanket, and tied with twine. Most of the packages of Cueva de la Candelaria were found incomplete, that were opened perhaps by looters.

== Background ==
Since the 17th century there are documents with colonial references to the Coahuila mortuary. In 1645, a Jesuit priest residing in Parras de la Fuente, Coahuila, found one day "… a place full of caves... he saw there... a skulls and human bones sepulcher..." (Pérez de Rivas, quoted in Gonzalez Arratia, 1999, p. 19). Toward 1778, priest Juan Agustín de Morfi reproduced the testimony of a Spanish captain in the Sierra del Carmen, north of Coahuila, "... found a very large cave with Indians corpses, wrapped in fine tapetes” (ibid).

However, until the 19th century when different people who explored or visited southwest Coahuila, particularly the Comarca Lagunera, made more precise descriptions of several caves in which the ancient pre-Hispanic inhabitants of the region deposited their dead in a flexed position, wrapped in blankets and tethered, resembling a package, hence the current name "mortuary package”. In 1880 English botanist Edward Palmer toured the Comarca Lagunera, where he found some caves with mortuary remains and a number of associated artifacts in wood, feathers, bone, seashells and stone. In June 2006 the book The exploration of Edward Palmer was published. To write this book, Leticia González Arratia spent a year at the Smithsonian Institution and a few weeks in the Peabody Museum of Harvard University with the goal of gathering further information on Palmer and his findings in the desert of Coahuila.

In 1838, Juan Nepomuceno Flores reveals that a Sierra Mojada cave contained many corpses with the mentioned features, and in 1848, Jose Ma. Avila talks about his visit to two mortuary caves, one of them located very near the El Coyote ranch near Torreón, Coahuila. Edward Palmer, English empirical botanist employed by the Peabody Museum, in 1880 found, with informers help, four caves located between El Coyote and Monclova. Although it had been looted, some closed mortuary packages were kept in the vicinity of the rancho El Coyote.

Finally, the most important registered mortuary cave of arid northern Mexico was explored professionally during the 20th century. It was Cueva de la Candelaria, located in the Valle de las Delicias, at the northern border of the Comarca Lagunera. It was explored in 1958 by a team of archaeologists, geologists and physical anthropologists, and their results are summarized in the work of Luis Aveleyra Arroyo de Anda, Irmgard W. Johnson, Pablo Martínez del Río and Arturo Romano.

== The site ==
=== La Candelaria burials ===
In three caves of the state of Coahuila, used as crypts the mortuary packages of three infants was found and more than 100 adults dating from the 13th century, according to INAH. Archaeologist Leticia González, an INAH researcher at that entity, unveiled that these packages had all associated artifacts inside and outside the shroud and that this demonstrates that hunter-gatherers of the Coahuila desert worshipped their ancestors.

In the research project “Mortuary Packages”, the expert analyzes funeral caves in the northern Mexico desert, and specifically of Coahuila, as La Candelaria, coyote and three springs, the latter, discovered two years ago in the Comarca Lagunera, southwest of the State. A subdivision of the objects found in the caves was made for more precise information thereon, on the one hand, studied the fabric used for the shroud, as well as bands and laces used to tie the corpse. Other subdivision are ornaments and work tools, located outside the shroud, such as spears, bows, huge baskets and digging sticks measuring between 50 and 60 cm long.

Then, after the objects subdivisions, the mortuary ritual of the Northern Mexico desert hunter-gatherers was divided into several segments. First the body preparation, i.e. place their clothes, ornaments, and instruments; wrap with the fabric and tie it; a peculiarity is that all the skeletons found in this part of the country were found in a flexed position. The next step was moving the bodies to the mortuary caves and place it there; it is important to clarify, that all caves in Coahuila, are underground; entrance is by a kind of very small hole and after about five or six meters the tunnel opens into a chamber.

These were kind of natural mausoleums, because in the state there are many caves of that type; very small, and is perhaps the reason why the bodies were flexed. The next step in the funeral ritual consisted in the cave preparation, where the body was placed; because it was observed that they were not simply left in the ground, but there was a process, the bodies were placed on wooden beds, nopal leaves or maguey leaves. Outside the shroud was placed everything that did not fit, obviously inside were huge baskets, arrows, bows, and digging sticks, all this is a constant in the tombs. Human remains were deposited in the funeral bed, but never actually buried.

On the other hand, the ritual was divided into several stages and corpses were not buried but placed in the caves along with hunters artifacts; three items seem always present (bows, huge baskets and digging sticks). Also there were two distinctive mortuary traditions: one is when the body is wrapped in fabric and the other in a petate or bedroll.

=== Coahuila mortuary caves ===
Mortuary packages located in several Coahuila caves reveal that hunter-gatherers groups from northern Mexico developed extremely complex rites and ceremonies in pre-Hispanic times, which constitute the complete social and religious scenario.

From the analysis made of unpublished documents and publications, as well as the archaeological material available both in Mexico and abroad, has been possible to develop a theory about the relationship of these caves with a complex and sophisticated mortuary ritual. This interpretation is based on the fact that the descriptions of documents match the archaeological material that has survived to our day, and in this comparison a number of characteristics are noted that repeat themselves throughout the centuries, which indicates a systematic disposition of the dead in pre-Hispanic times.

An important fact is that bodies are placed on a cave, and in most cases, entry is in the form of a shaft with a steep slope towards the interior, several meters in length, where a first chamber is located, with one or more additional underground chambers.

These chambers received the corpses of a number of people. In some cases up to 30, as in the La Paila cave, and other "many" in the Coyote. In Cueva de la Candelaria not less than 200 individuals were found and in the Sierra Mojada, a quick calculation by its discoverer, around 1,000. In addition to the quantity diversity, as per all testimonials, is that originally corpses were placed tied in “mortuary packages” and arranged one next to another or one above the other.

== Sources ==
- Pijoan Aguadé, Carmen Ma. y Josefina Mansilla Lory (2000), "La Cueva de la Candelaria: bultos mortuorios y materiales", en Chungará. Revista de Antropología Chilena, v.32, n.2, julio.
