= Matamoros, Coahuila =

City in the Mexican state of Coahuila

- Municipal seat
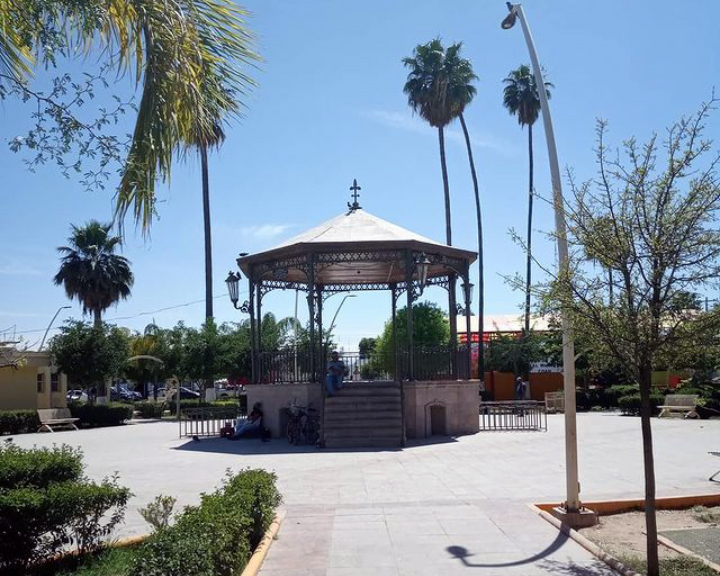

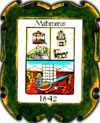
- Coat of arms

- Location within Coahuila Location within Mexico
- Coordinates: 25°31′45″N 103°13′48″W
- Country: Mexico
- State: Coahuila
- Municipality: Matamoros

Population (2005)
  - Total: 48,511

Matamoros is a city located in the southwestern part of the Mexican state of Coahuila; it serves as the seat of the surrounding municipality of the same name. It lies directly east of the larger city of Torreón and is a part of the Comarca Lagunera, a larger metropolitan area that includes the municipality of Torreón in Coahuila in addition to the municipalities of Gómez Palacio and Lerdo in the adjacent state of Durango.

At the 2010 census the city had a population of 52,599, while the municipality had a population of 107,007.

At the 2010 census the city had a population of 52,599 inhabitants, while the municipality had a population of 107,007. The municipality has an area of 1,003.7 km² (387.53 sq mi), which includes many small outlying communities, the largest of which is the town of San Antonio del Coyote.

It is one of the cities that make up the Lagunera Region. Together with the city of Torreón in Coahuila, and the cities of Gómez Palacio and Ciudad Lerdo in the state of Durango, they make up the metropolitan area of La Laguna.

== History ==
In 1839, a group of settlers settled in "la Vega de Marrufo", property of the marquisate of Aguayo, however it was abandoned some time later due to major floods.

=== The Village of Matamoros ===
In 1864 during the Second French intervention in Mexico, under the orders of Benito Juárez, the native of "El Gatuño", today called "Congregation Hidalgo" Don Juan de la Cruz Borrego, along with a group of people, were entrusted with guarding of eleven carts loaded with a selection of valuable documents that were of the greatest importance for the Liberal Party and for the cause of Juárez. These documents were hidden in "the Bat Cave" today called "the Tobacco Cave."

On September 5, 1864, it was elevated to the category of Villa, La Villa de Matamoros by the then President Benito Juárez. On August 28 of this same year, President Benito Juárez issues the decree to grant the farmers the right over the lots that would make up the town.

On February 27, 1927, when Plutarco Elías Calles was president, it was granted the status of city.

== Natural resources ==
The main mineral resource is the sandy banks exploited by the construction industry, mainly the Brick Industry, which due to the properties of the clay in this region, turns out to be of very good quality.

Another of the vast natural resources in the region is mesquite charcoal. In addition, its firewood is used in homes and bakeries in Matamoros.

== Demography ==
According to the census carried out by the National Institute of Statistics and Geography (INEGI), Matamoros has a total of 59,762 inhabitants, 29,256 men and 30,506 women.

The average level of schooling is 9.73 years. It has a fertility rate of 2.21 children per woman.

== Religion ==
=== Catholic Church ===
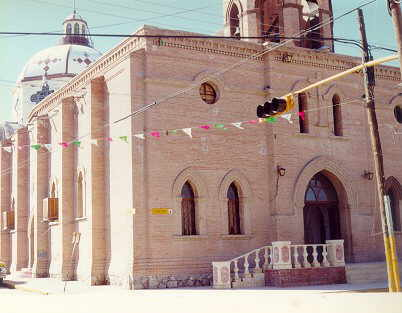
Matamoros Church.

Matamoros belongs to the Diocese of Torreón. On July 4 of each year, the fair of La Virgen del Refugio, patron saint of the city, is organized, which includes mechanical games, grape harvests and religious music concerts.

== Communication routes ==
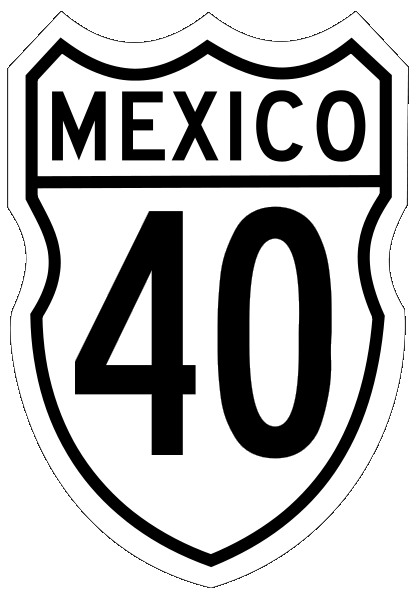
Federal Highway 40

By land via Federal Highway 40 Torreón-Saltillo, which crosses the state of Coahuila from side to side; It is also located half an hour from the Torreón Bus Station. And by air, it is 30 minutes from Torreón International Airport.

== Recreation ==
Among the most visited places are the Plaza de Armas, the Tobacco Cave, Home Run, the main church, the Historic Center and the Municipal Gymnasium. In addition, events are held by the municipal government such as dances, plays, plays and folk music concerts on the esplanade of the municipal presidency.

Matamoros is also home to the popular Wet Laguna water park.
