= Matamoras =

Matamoras may refer to:

- Matamoras, Indiana
- Matamoras, Ohio
- Matamoras, Pennsylvania

== See also ==
- Matamoros (disambiguation)
