= Coat of arms of Coahuila =

Coat of Arms of Coahuila

The Coat of arms of Coahuila (Spanish: Escudo de Coahuila de Zaragoza, lit. "state shield of Coahuila") is a symbol of the Free and Sovereign State of Coahuila.

== Symbolism ==
It is a curtain, with the lower tablecloth representing, on a blue background, the indigenous name of Coahuila, which means grove and whose name undoubtedly came from the leafy walnut trees that grew in the most abundant spring of the now municipality of Monclova, a town that, despite its successive designations, continued to be called with admirable persistence San Francisco de Coahuila or, simply, Coahuila, which gave its name to the Coahuiltecan tribe and its name to the river that today bears the name of Monclova. It is possible that the name Coahuila is made up of two Nahuatl words, Coatl which means Serpent and Huilotl which means Bird in Flight. The early Spaniards that settled what is now Coahuila and earlier the Nueva Extremadura de Coahuila believed that in the oak moats there was a certain species of snake capable of flying. These flying snakes were popularly known as "Alicantres." In the Coat of Arms of present day Coahuila, a red sun emerges from the walnut tree to symbolize that the Mexican revolution was born in Coahuila. The sinister curtain recalls that the southern portion of the territory that today forms the State of Coahuila belonged until 1787 to Nueva Vizcaya, whose arms are those that appear on this curtain and are none other than those of the old Basque province of the same name; on a blue field, a tree and two crossed wolves, introducing the variant of changing the blue background for a silver one. The curtain on the right contains, with the only variant that the blue background was changed for a gold one, the coat of arms of the city of Badajoz, which is in turn the coat of arms of the province of Extremadura, thereby representing the historical fact that the portion of the current State of Coahuila located north of twenty-six degrees of boreal latitude had the name of Nueva Extremadura. The arms consist of a rampant lion of gules supported on a silver column, with the Latin legend: “Plus Ultra”. On the border of the coat of arms, the inscription: Coahuila de Zaragoza.

== History ==
In 1942, at the initiative of Vito Alessio Robles, the governor of the state, Benecio López Padilla, sent a bill for the adoption of the Coat of Arms, which was approved on October 23 of the same year.

== See also ==
- Coahuila
- Coat of arms of Mexico
