= Universidad La Salle México =

Multi-campus Catholic university in Mexico

Coordinates: 19.4076°N 99.1822°W

La Salle University, Mexico
- Universidad La Salle México
- Former names: Colegio Cristobal Colon High School
- Motto: Indivisa Manent (Latin)
- Motto in English: Remain Undivided
- Type: Private Catholic
- Established: 1962; 64 years ago
- Founders: Institute of the Brothers of the Christian Schools
- Religious affiliation: Roman Catholic (Christian Brothers)
- Academic affiliations: CNAHEC; IALU
- President: Br. José Francisco Flores Gamio, F.S.C.
- Location: Mexico City, Mexico
- Campus: Urban 15 campuses Main: Mexico City
- Colors: Blue - White - Red
- Nickname: ULSA
- Mascot: Eagles
- Website: www.lasalle.mx

Universidad La Salle also referred to by its acronym ULSA is a private Catholic university run by the Institute of the Brothers of the Christian Schools in 15 campuses in Mexico. It offers high school, bachelor, master and Ph.D degrees. It has had an expansion in the country, creating its own university national system. Its main campus is located in Mexico City, and has a presence in Ciudad Obregón, Chihuahua, Gomez Palacio, Monterrey, Ciudad Victoria, Leon, Morelia, Pachuca, Ciudad Nezahualcóyotl, Puebla, Oaxaca, Cancún, Cuernavaca and Saltillo.

It is part of the educational community of the Brothers of the Christian Schools, founded by Saint Jean-Baptiste de La Salle, patron saint of education. The congregation has about seventy-seven thousand lay partners and one million students around the world, with establishments of higher learning in Argentina, Belgium, Brazil, Colombia, France, Guatemala, Israel, Ivory Coast, Jerusalem, Pakistan, Palestine, Philippines, Spain, the United States, and Venezuela.

== History ==
In 1905, the brothers of La Salle Jerbert Alphonse Gibert, Adrien Marie Astruc, Amedée Francois Vincent and Antoinde Claude Carrel traveled to Mexico from Le Havre, France, along with Br. Pedro Celestino Schniedier who traveled from Colombia. They founded the delegation of LaSalle brethren in Mexico. The brothers established schools in Puebla, Toluca, Torreon, Monterrey, and various other locations in the country. Their first high school in Mexico City opened in 1931, the Colegio Francés De la Salle. In 1932 the school won formal recognition and authorization by the National Autonomous University of Mexico. In 1938 the Colegio Cristóbal Colón was also established in the Colonia San Rafael.

The history of Universidad La Salle began with the relocation of Colegio Cristóbal Colón to the center of the traditional Colonia Condesa in Mexico City in 1962. On February 15 it opened its doors with only the high school building completed and a partially built tower, gym and auditorium. By May of the same year, it had rapidly grown to announce its transformation from just a school to a full university category. Since then, it has undergone continuous expansion. The main campus has a population of approximately 10,000 students, and has expanded its campus throughout Mexico City with buildings in many areas of the city.

There are branches of Universidad La Salle in 15 Mexican states. The La Salle educational institution itself is represented in over 82 different countries, and 5 continents making it the largest educational community in the world.

ULSA is among the top 7 private universities in Mexico and ranked in the top three in areas such as Architecture, Mechanical Engineering, Industrial Engineering, Chemical Engineering and Medicine.

The Universidad La Salle medical school (Facultad Mexicana de Medicina) is one of the most prestigious medical schools in Mexico. It was Mexico's first private medical school and was founded in 1970. It is accredited by the Consejo Mexicano para la Acreditación de la Educación Médica (COMAEM), and is listed in the International Medical Education Directory. Albeit a young school, many of the country's department heads are graduates from La Salle.

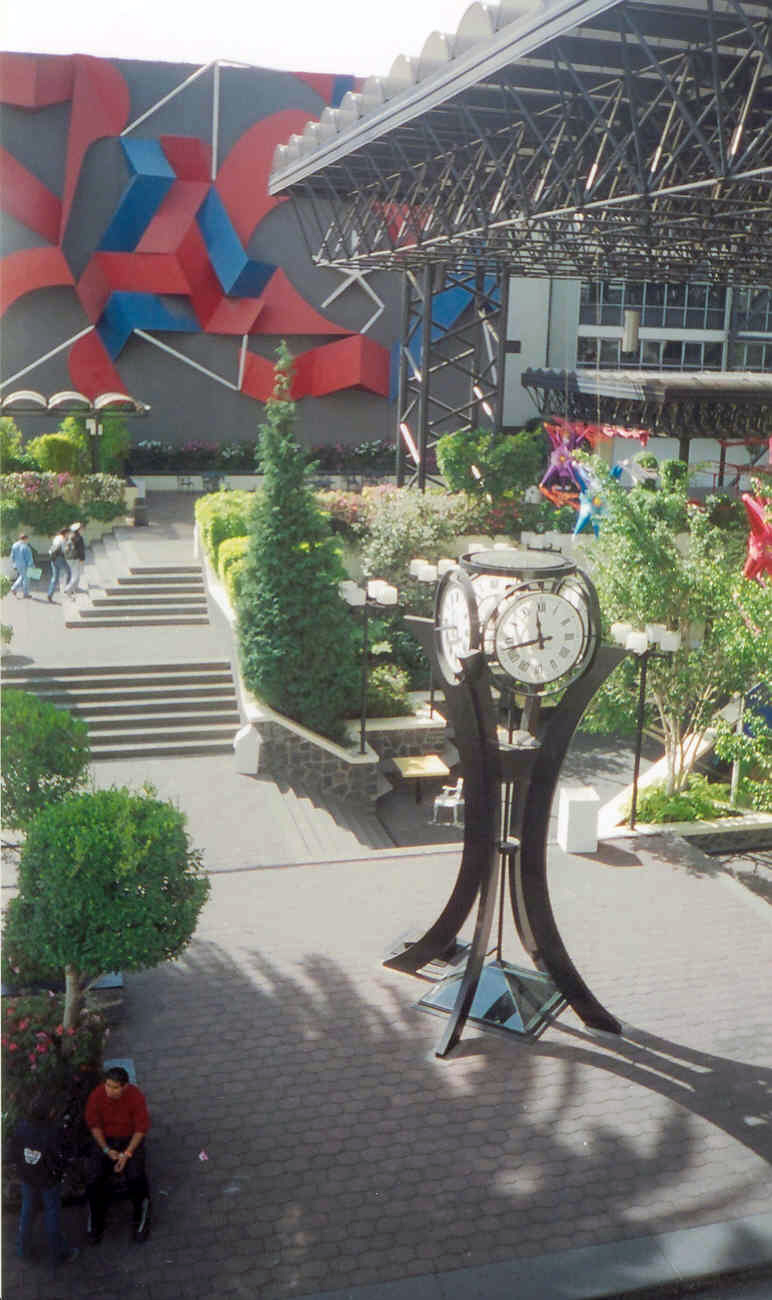

== University presidents ==
- 2021–Present Hno. José Francisco Flores Gamio F.S.C.
- 2011– 2021 Dr. Enrique Gonzalez Alvarez
- 2009–2011 M.A. Martín Rocha Pedrajo
- 2006–2009 Dr. Ambrosio Luna Salas
- 2000–2006 Mtro. Raúl Valadez García
- 1991–2000 Dr. Lucio Tazzer de Schrijver
- 1988–1991 Dr. José Cervantes Hernández
- 1983–1988 M.A. César Rangel Barrera
- 1974–1983 Dr. Francisco L. Cervantes Lechuga
- 1968–1974 Dr. Guillermo Alba López
- 1962–1968 Dr. Manuel de J. Álvarez Campos

== Campuses ==
- Cancún
- Chihuahua
- Ciudad Obregón
- Ciudad Nezahualcóyotl
- Ciudad Victoria
- Cuernavaca
- Guadalajara
- Laguna
- León
- Mexico City
- Monterrey
- Morelia
- Pachuca
- Puebla
- Saltillo
- Oaxaca

== Programs ==
- Architecture
- Accounting
- Biomedical Engineering
- Business Administration
- Chemical engineering
- Chemistry of Food
- Civil engineering
- Communications
- Cybernetics and computer science engineering
- Education
- Electrical and electronic systems engineering
- Graphic design
- Industrial engineering
- International Relations
- International business trade
- Law
- Marketing
- Management information systems
- Mechanical and Energy systems engineering
- Mechatronics Engineering
- Medicine
- Pharmaceutical biochemistry
- Philosophy
- Religious studies
- University-preparatory school

== Degrees ==
Foundation Year	School	Career	Starting Year
1962	High School		1962
1964	Mexican School of Architecture, Design and Communication	Architecture	1964
		Communication Science	2001
		Graphic Design	1990
1961	Business School	Actuaría	
		Administration	1961
		Trade and International Business	
		Accounts	1961
		Information Technology for Business	
1967	Faculty of Law	Law	1967
		International Relationships	
1968	Faculty of Humanities and Social Sciences	Educational Sciences	
		Religious sciences	1971
		Elementary School	
		Teaching of Foreign Language	
		Philosophy	1968
		Psychology	
1964	Engineer School	Biomedical Engineering	
		Cybernetic Engineering and Computational Systems	1975
		Civil engineering	1964
		Electronic Engineering and Communications	1965
		Industrial Engineering	1965
		Mechanic Engineering	1965
1970	Mexican School of Medicine	Medical Doctor	1970
1973	Chemical Science School	Environmental Engineering	
		Chemical Engineering	1973
		Chemistry of Food	
		Pharmaceutical Chemical Biologist	1973
		Biomedical Engineering	2008

== Specialties ==
Area	Specialties
White-Collar Workers	Taxes
	Corporate and Stock Exchange Finance
	Lógistic and Electronic Business
	Marketing and Publicity
Sciences	Quality and Estadític
a	Company's Right
Higher education	Higher education
	Strategies Psicopedagógicas in The Educational practice
Mexican School of Architecture, Design and Communication	Management of Real-Estate Projects
	Strategic Step of Check Mark
Mexican School of Medicine	Anesthesiology
	General surgery
	Gynecology and Obstetrics
	Critical Care Medicine
	Internal medicine
	Neonatology
	Otorhinolaryngology (ENT)
	Pediatrics
	Psychiatry
	Radiology
	Orthopedics

== Graduate programs ==
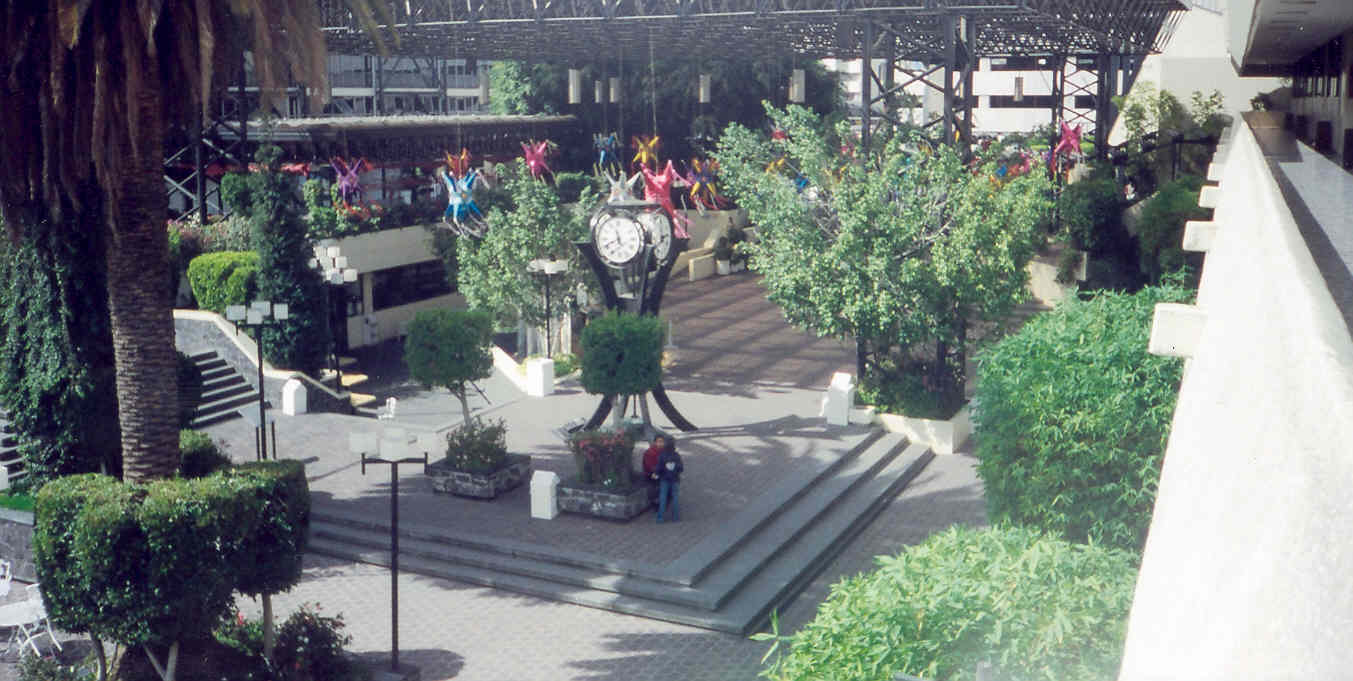
Plaza La Salle.

=== Business School ===
- Administration
- International Business Administration
- Health Organizations Administration
- Economic and Financial Engineering
- Strategic Management of Human Capital
- Information Technologies in the Business Direction

=== Chemical Sciences School ===
- Food Science and Human Nutrition
- Clinical Pharmacology
- Quality and Applied Statistics

=== Law School ===
- Business law
- Civil law
- Criminal law

=== Engineering School ===
- Master of Science, Field of Cybertronics
- Project Management and Building Business

=== Social Sciences and Humanities School ===
- Social Philosophy
- Master of Education, Field of Education Management
- Master of Education, Field of Educational Intervention

=== Mexican Architecture, Design and Communication School ===
- Management of Real Estate Projects

=== Graduate school and research direction ===
- MIEX Master International Management
- MIEX General Information for 2nd academic year

== Doctorates ==
- Administration
- Education

== Ph.D. ==
- Education
- Law

== Courses of distant learning ==
- Courses of Quality in the Service
- Assertive communication
- Discipline with dignity
- Design of Strategies for the Evaluation for Competitions
- Strategies of Motivation at the Classroom
- Developmental strategies of the Competition Lectora in the Pupil of half level and half a superior
- Evaluation of the Quality of the Services
- Effective negotiation
- New form of Learning News
- Planning for Competitions
- Preparation for Residencias's National Exam Medical (ENARM)

== Courses of continuous education ==
- Orthographic Bringing Up To Date and Modern Wording
- Juridical argumentation
- Emotional intelligence
- Finance stops Nonfinancial
- Selling Techniques

== See also ==
- Institute of the Brothers of the Christian Schools

== Bibliography ==
- Concepción Barrón Tirado. Universidades privadas: formación en educación, Mexico, ed.National Autonomous university of Mexico, Plaza and Valdés, ISBN 978-970-722-152-9
- LEVY, Daniel C. (1995) higher education and the status in Latin America: Private challenges to the public predominance Collection Problemas educational of Mexico, Mexico, ed.Latin American faculty of Social Sciences, Estudios's Centro on the University, UNAM, Miguel angel Porrúa, ISBN 978-968-842-520-6
- ULSA (1979) Catálogo Universidad The Salle A.C. 79-80 Mexico, ed.The University's Apartment of Information and Promotion Her, Leave To Him
