= State Anthem of Coahuila =

Local anthem in Mexico

Himno del Estado de Coahuila
English: State Anthem of Coahuila
- State anthem of Coahuila
- Music: José Luis Ulloa Pedroza, 2003
- Adopted: 2003

Audio sample
- Himno del Estado de Coahuila: file; help

The ’State Anthem of Coahuila' (Spanish: Himno del Estado de Coahuila) was published in 2003 by the government of Enrique Martínez y Martínez. It was composed by José Luis Ulloa Pedroza.

== Lyrics ==
Spanish lyrics

I
Hoy rendimos un tributo a Coahuila,
con orgullo nuestras voces se unirán,
y al cantar a la grandeza de esta tierra
alma, voz y corazones vibrarán.
Oh, Coahuila, mi tierra tan querida
he venido hoy con júbilo a exaltar
las virtudes infinitas de este suelo
que es ejemplo de trabajo y dignidad.

Coro:
𝄆 Es Coahuila una tierra bendita
de carácter tenaz y ejemplar;
que orgullosos sus hijos proclaman
bello Estado triunfante, inmortal. 𝄇

II
Al mirar su desierto y sus montañas,
escenario del esfuerzo creador,
surge el nombre de los hombres y mujeres
que forjaron con valor esta Nación.
Son tus hijos gran orgullo de esta Patria
que nos dieron con su vida libertad;
un ejemplo de este pueblo infatigable
con estirpe de nobleza y de lealtad.

Coro

III
Demostremos decididos que en Coahuila,
con pasión por esta senda al transitar,
cada paso engrandece nuestra historia
como herencia de paz y unidad.
Coahuilenses hoy unamos nuestras voces
entonemos nuestro canto con fervor;
y vivamos siempre en aras de armonía
trabajando por un México mejor.

Coro

English translation

I
Today we give tribute to Coahuila
With pride our voices are joined
Singing to the greatness of this land
Soul, voice and hearts will vibrate
Oh Coahuila my beloved land
I have come today with rejoice to exalt
The infinite virtues of this land
Which is an example of work and dignity

Chorus:
𝄆 Coahuila is a blessed land
With a tenacious and exemplary character
With pride its sons proclaimed
Beautiful triumphant and immortal state 𝄇

II
When we look at its desert and mountains
Scenery from a creative effort
The names of men and women arise
They forget with courage this nation
Your children are a pride of this father land
Whose lives gave us freedom
An example of an untiring people
With a noble and loyal lineage

Chorus

III
We have to demonstrate that in Coahuila
With passion on this road we go
Each step aggrandizes our a great history
As a heritage of peace and unity
Coahuila let's join our voices
let's tune our song with enthusiasm
And live with harmony forever
Working for a better Mexico

Chorus
