= Met-Mex Peñoles =

Met-Mex Peñoles is a large metallurgical and chemical company located in Torreón, Coahuila, Mexico. This industrial site processes the majority of the zinc and lead mineral ores mined in Mexico and some other countries.

The facility produces the following metals: silver, gold, zinc, lead, cadmium and bismuth; as well as the following chemicals: sulfuric acid, oleum, and antimony trioxide.

This metallurgical complex is the largest producer of silver in the world, the largest producer of zinc in Latin America, and the most important producer of gold and lead in Mexico.

Peñoles Group is not only Met-Mex. It includes a variety of business units like mines, metallurgical, chemical and administrative companies.
