= Aguanaval River =

River located in northeastern Mexico

Coordinates: 24.250237°N 102.88602°W

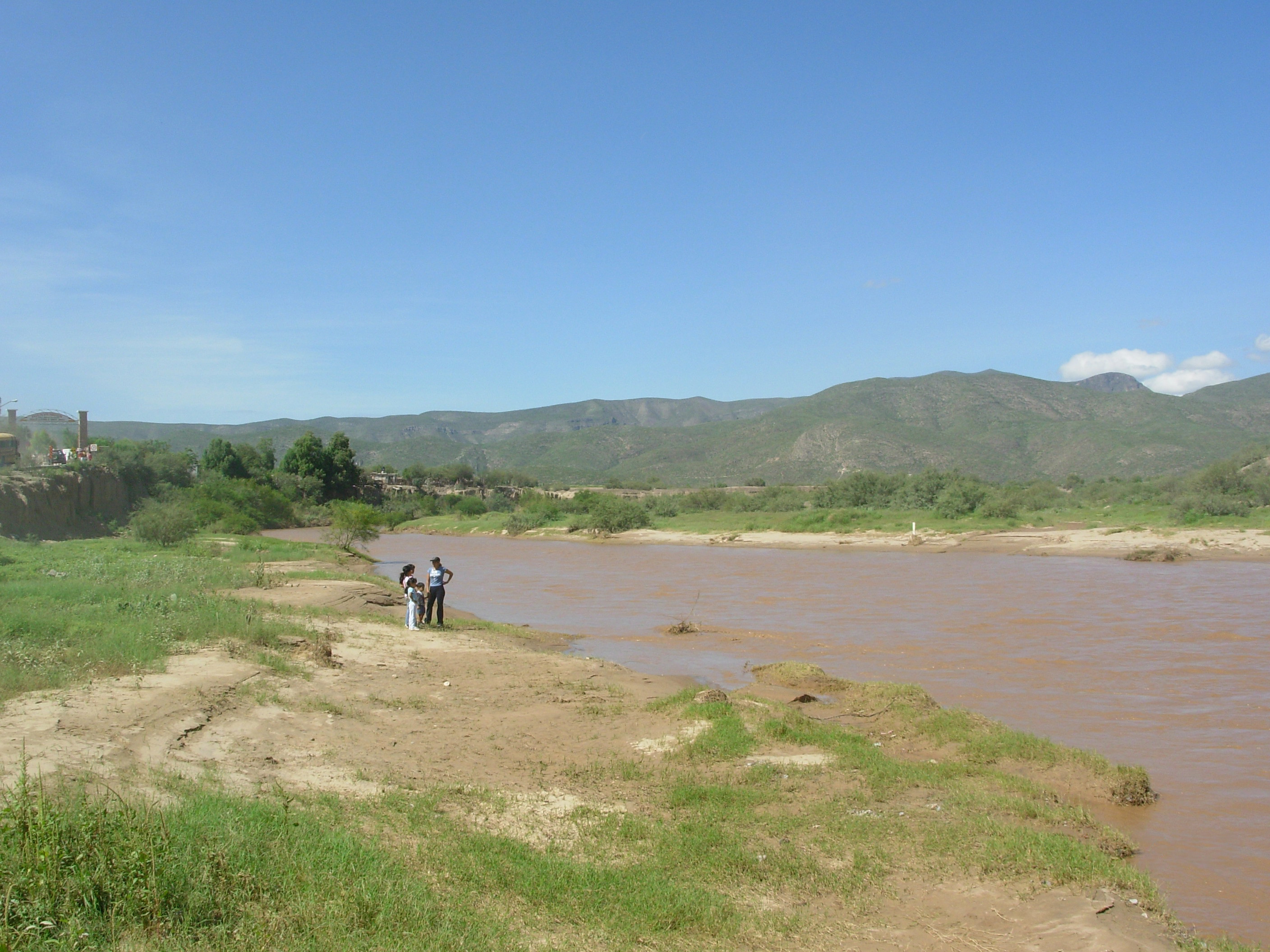

- Location of mouth

Location
- Country: Mexico
- State: Zacatecas, Durango, Coahuila

The Aguanaval River is a river located in northcentral Mexico.

== Geography ==
It originates in the southern Sierra Madre Occidental range of Zacatecas state, and flows generally north through Zacatecas and Durango states to empty into the endorheic Bolsón de Mapimí, in Coahuila state.

Of the 1,471 basins in Mexico, the Aguanaval is one of the rivers that belong to the interior drainage basin.

== Use ==
The Aguanaval River water is withdrawn and used extensively for irrigation in the Laguna Region of Durango and Coahuila.

== See also ==
- List of longest rivers of Mexico
- List of rivers of Mexico
