= Mariano Matamoros, Chihuahua =

Town in the Mexican state of Chihuahua

Mariano Matamoros
- Town
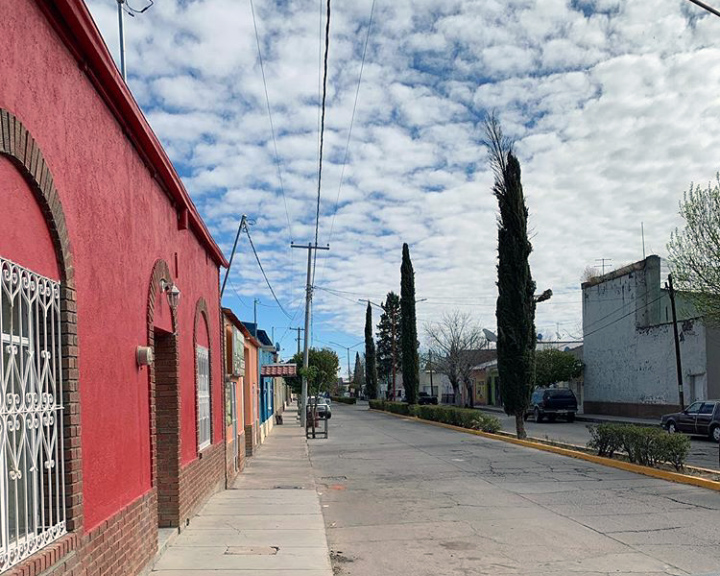

- Location within Chihuahua Location within Mexico
- Coordinates: 26°45′45″N 105°35′5″W
- Country: Mexico
- State: Chihuahua
- Municipality: Matamoros

Population (2010)
  - Total: 2,615
- Time zone: UTC-6

Mariano Matamoros (aka Villa Matamoros or simply Matamoros) is a town and seat of the municipality of Matamoros, in the northern Mexican state of Chihuahua. As of 2010, the town had a population of 2,615, up from 2,256 as of 2005.
