= Coahuila =

State of Mexico

Coahuila Nacika (Lipan Apache)
- State
- Free and Sovereign State of Coahuila de Zaragoza; Estado Libre y Soberano de Coahuila de Zaragoza (Spanish)
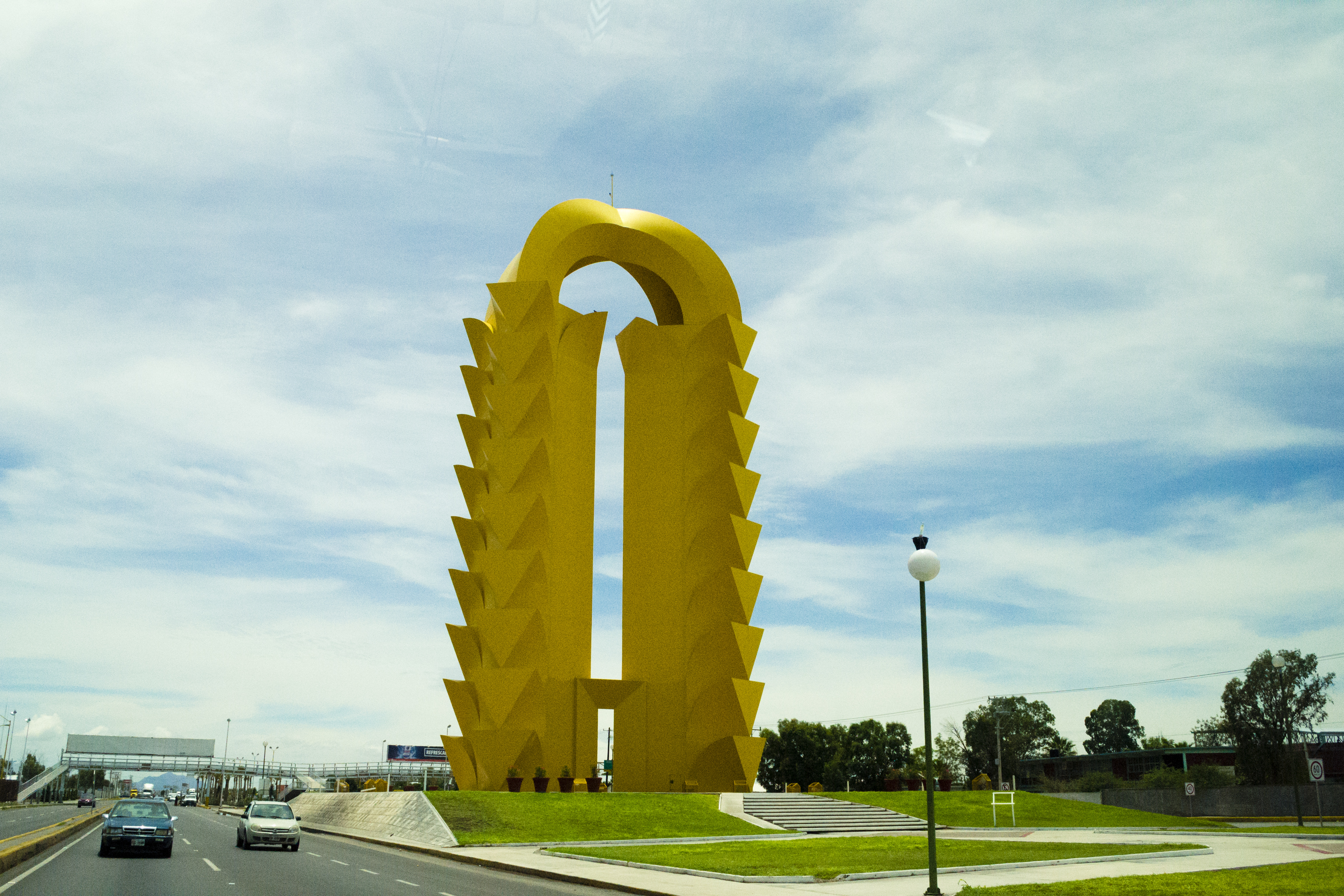
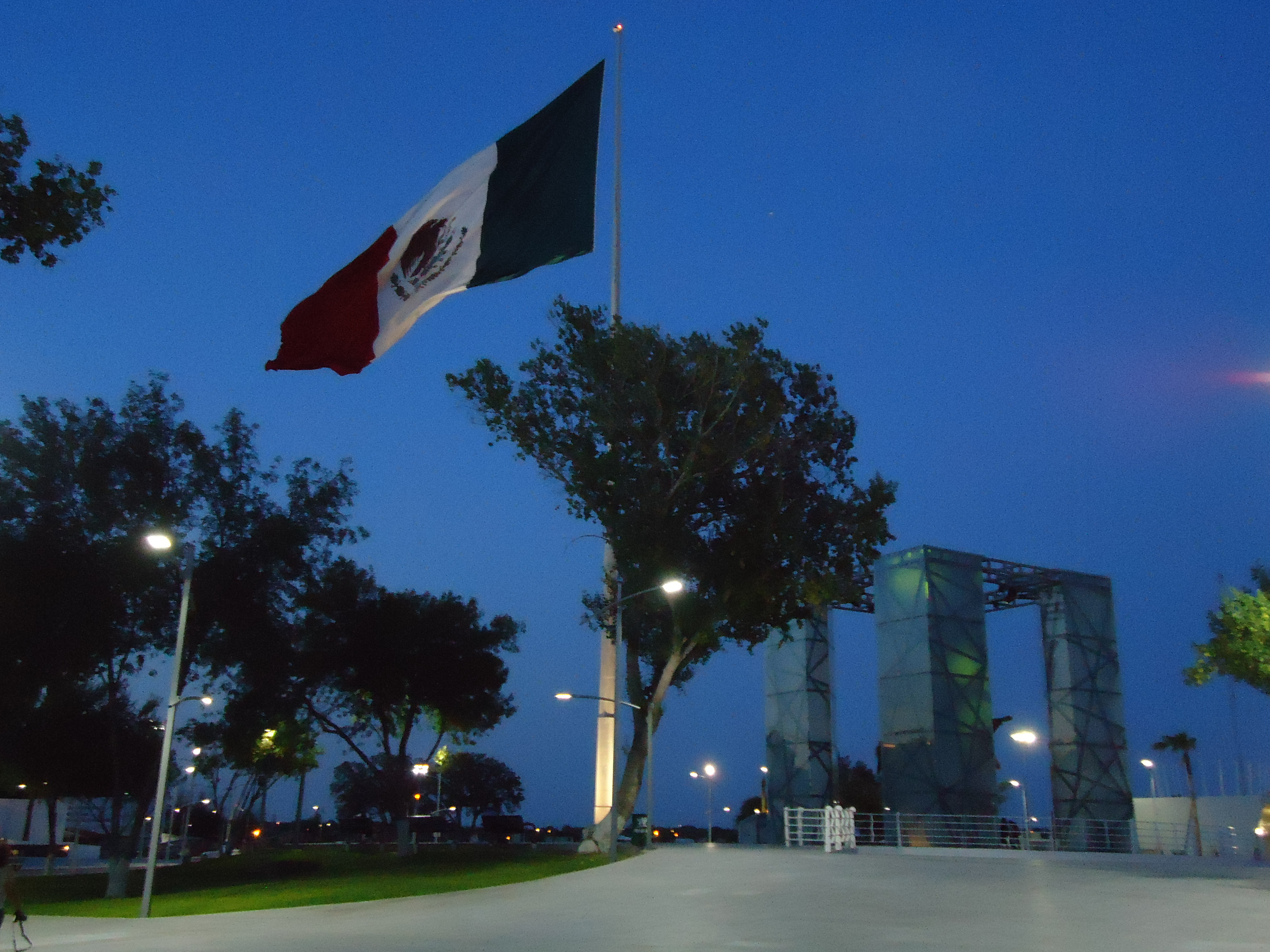
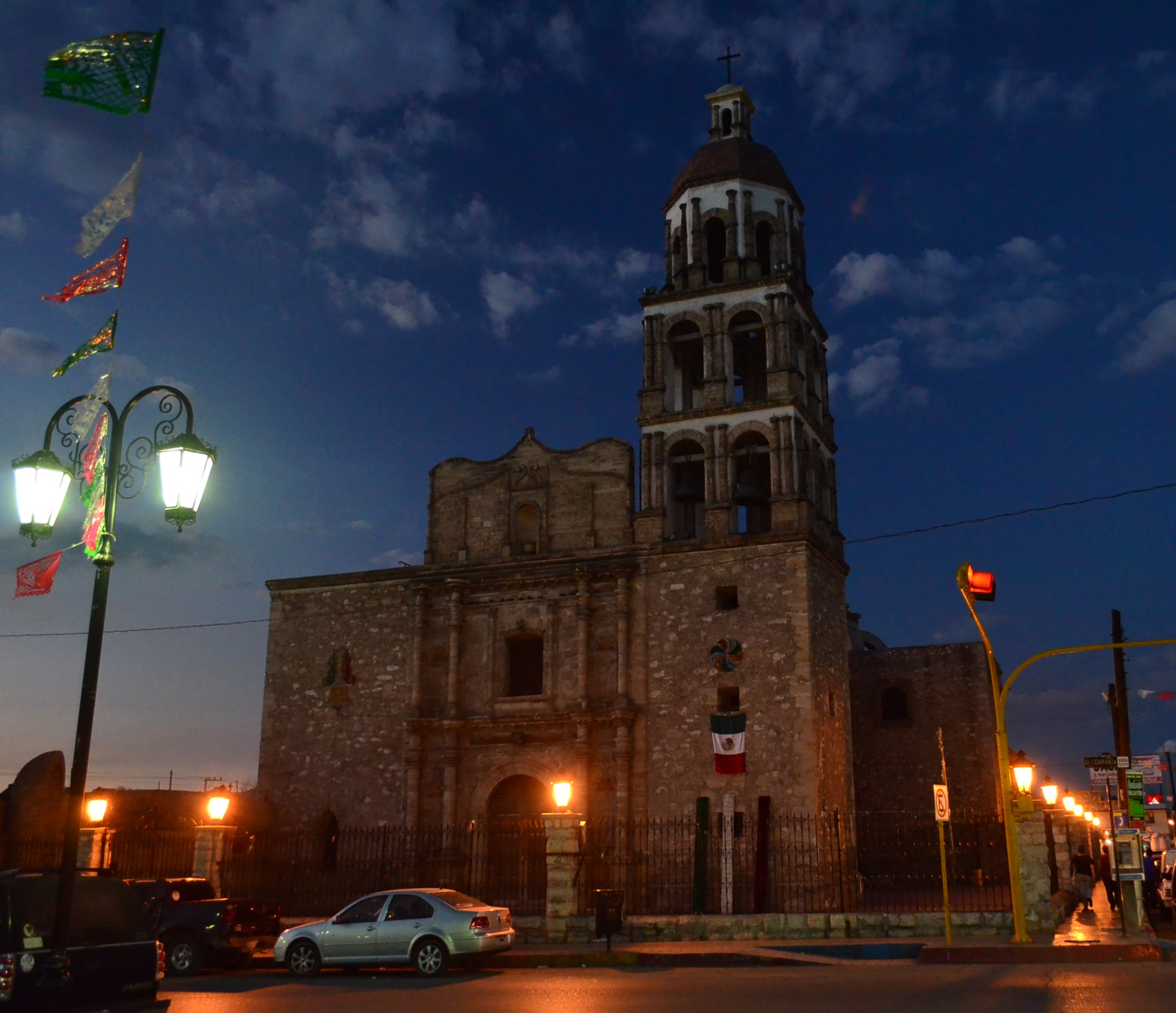
- Torreón Piedras Negras Monclova

- Coat of arms
- Motto: Plus Ultra (Latin)
- Anthem: State Anthem of Coahuila (Español: Himno Coahuilense)
- State of Coahuila within Mexico
- Coordinates: 27°18′N 102°3′W
- Country: Mexico
- Capital and largest city: Saltillo
- Largest metro: La Laguna
- Municipalities: 38
- Admission: May 7, 1824
- Order: 16th^{[a]}

Government
  - Governor: Manolo Jiménez Salinas (PRI)
  - Senators: Reyes Flores Hurtado (Morena); Eva Eugenia Galaz Caletti (Morena); Verónica Martínez García (PRI)
  - Deputies: Federal deputies: • Brígido Moreno Hernández (1st); • Francisco Javier Borrego Adame (2nd); • Ana Patricia Cardona Ortiz (3rd); • Jericó Abramo Masso (4th); • José Antonio Gutiérrez Jardón (5th); • Shamir Fernández Hernández (6th); • Jaime Bueno Zertuche (7th)

Area
  - Total: 151,595 km^{2} (58,531 sq mi)
- Ranked 3rd
- Highest elevation (Sierra de la Marta): 3,710 m (12,170 ft)

Population (2020)
  - Total: 3,146,771
  - Rank: 15th
  - Density: 20.7577/km^{2} (53.7623/sq mi)
  - Rank: 26th
- Demonym: Coahuilense

GDP
  - Total: MXN 1.035 trillion (US$51.5 billion) (2022)
  - Per capita: US$15,699 (2022)
- Time zone: UTC−06:00 (Zona Centro)
  - Summer (DST): UTC−05:00 (DST)
- Postal code: 25 - 27
- Area code: Area codes: • 842; • 844; • 861; • 862; • 864; • 866; • 867; • 869; • 871; • 872; • 873; • 877; • 878
- ISO 3166 code: MX-COA
- HDI: ▲0.833 very high Ranked 3rd of 32
- Website: Official website
- a. Joined to the federation under the name of Coahuila y Texas; also recognized as Coahuila y Tejas.

Coahuila, (Note: Spanish pronunciation: [koaˈwila]) formally Coahuila de Zaragoza, (Note: Latin American Spanish: [koaˈwila ðe saɾaˈɣosa]; Lipan: Nacika) officially the Free and Sovereign State of Coahuila de Zaragoza, (Note: Spanish: Estado Libre y Soberano de Coahuila de Zaragoza) is one of the 31 states of Mexico. The largest city and state capital is the city of Saltillo; the second largest is Torreón and the third largest is Monclova (a former state capital); the fourth largest is Piedras Negras; and the fifth largest is Ciudad Acuña.

Coahuila borders the Mexican states of Nuevo León to the east, Zacatecas to the south, and Durango and Chihuahua to the west. To the north, Coahuila accounts for a 512-kilometre (318 mi) stretch of the Mexico–United States border, adjacent to the U.S. state of Texas along the course of the Rio Grande (Río Bravo del Norte). With an area of 151,563 square kilometres (58,519 sq mi), it is the nation's third-largest state. It comprises 38 municipalities (municipios). In the 2020 Census, Coahuila had a population of 3,146,771.

== Toponymy ==
There are various theories regarding the origin of the name Coahuila. For example, Vito Alessio Robles, a military officer and historian from Coahuila, claimed that the name originated from the combination of the words “koatl” and “wilana,” which in the Nahuatl language could be interpreted as “place where snakes crawl.”

On the other hand, according to historian Tomás Zepeda, the name of the state (in Nahuatl, Kwawillan) derives from the word “kwawitl,” meaning “tree,” and the commonly used locative suffix “-tlan,” which denotes abundance. Together, they mean “place where trees abound.”

This latter interpretation is the most widely accepted today. Accordingly, the lower section of the state's coat of arms features a grove of trees, representing the lush walnut groves of the city of Monclova, Coahuila.

Today, the state's official name is the “Free, Independent and Sovereign State of Coahuila de Zaragoza,” in honor of General Ignacio Zaragoza, who was born in the state.

== History ==
The Spanish explored the north of Mexico some decades after their victory in Tenochtitlan, the capital of the Aztecs. Such exploration was delayed because the northern climate was harsher and there was no gold. The first Spanish settlement in the region now called Coahuila was at Minas de la Trinidad in 1577. Saltillo was settled in 1586, to form part of the province of Nueva Vizcaya of the Vice-royalty of New Spain. Later it became one of the first provinces of Nueva Extremadura to be explored by Europeans. Among the 16th century settlers of Saltillo and other communities in Nueva Vizcaya were Tlaxcalans, who founded an independent community bordering Saltillo, called San Esteban de Nueva Tlaxcala.

Coahuila y Tejas was one of the constituent states of the newly independent United Mexican States under their 1824 Constitution, and included Texas, Coahuila and Nuevo León. Later in the same year Nuevo León was detached, but Texas remained a part of the state until 1836, when it seceded to form the Republic of Texas. Monclova was the capital of the state from 1833 to 1835.

In 1840, Coahuila briefly became a member of the short lived Republic of the Rio Grande. In the mid-19th century, the Sánchez Navarro family owned a ranch of 6,700,000 ha (16,500,000 acres) mostly in Coahuila. It was the largest privately owned property in the Americas.

In the 1840s and 1850s, Coahuila was the target of frequent Comanche raids.

On February 19, 1856, Santiago Vidaurri annexed Coahuila to his state, Nuevo León, but it regained its separate status in 1868.

During the Mexican Revolution, Francisco Villa attacked the city of Torreón.

On April 4, 2004, the border city of Piedras Negras was flooded. More than 30 people died and more than 4,000 lost their homes.

In 2007 Coahuila became the first state in Mexico to offer civil unions (Pacto Civil de Solidaridad) to same-sex couples.

== Archaeological finds ==
In July 2025, archaeologists from Mexico’s National Institute of Anthropology and History (INAH) and CONANP discovered a pre-Hispanic mortuary cave in the desert mountains of Coahuila. Accessed via a narrow 50‑cm vertical shaft, the cave contained the remains of around 17 individuals, including men, women, and children, who were interred in bundled form on baskets or mats. The semi-circular chamber preserved 12 complete skulls (five of which belonged to children), and while evidence of modern looting was present, the burials share significant similarities with those at Coahuila’s Candelaria Cave. The finds are being preserved at the Regional Museum of La Laguna in Torreón.

== Geography ==
The Sierra Madre Oriental runs northwest to southeast through the State, and the higher elevations are home to the Sierra Madre Oriental pine-oak forests. The northernmost fingers of the Sierra Madre Oriental, the Sierra del Burro and the Sierra del Carmen, reach to the border with the United States at the Rio Grande.

East of the range, the land slopes gently toward the Rio Grande, and is drained by several rivers, including the Salado and its tributary, the Sabinas River. The Tamaulipan mezquital, a dry shrubland ecoregion, occupies the eastern portion of the State, and extends across the Rio Grande into southern Texas.

The portion of the State west of the Sierra Madre Oriental lies on the Mexican Plateau, and is part of the Chihuahuan Desert. The Bolsón de Mapimí is a large endorheic basin which covers much of the western portion of the State and extends into adjacent portions of Chihuahua, Durango, and Zacatecas. The Nazas River, which flows east from Durango, and the Aguanaval River, which flows north from Zacatecas, empty into lakes in the Bolsón. Torreón, the most populous city in the State, lies on the Nazas in the irrigated Laguna Region, the (Comarca Lagunera), which straddles the border of Coahuila and Durango.

Coahuila contains two biosphere reserves. Maderas del Carmen lies on the northern border of the State, and includes sections of the Chihuahuan desert and sky islands of pine-oak forest in the Sierra del Carmen. The springs, lakes, and wetlands of the Cuatro Ciénegas Basin lie west of Monclova on the west slope of the Sierra Madre.

Coahuila is largely arid or semi-arid, but the rivers of the State support extensive irrigated agriculture, particularly cotton. The Parras district in the southern part of the State produces wines and brandies. The pine-oak forests of the Sierra Madre produce timber.

== Demographics ==
Largest cities or towns in Coahuila Source:
Rank		Municipality	Pop.
1	Saltillo	Saltillo	864,431
2	Torreón	Torreón	690,193
3	Monclova	Monclova	237,169
4	Piedras Negras	Piedras Negras	173,959
5	Ciudad Acuña	Acuña	160,255
6	Ramos Arizpe	Ramos Arizpe	114,010
7	Frontera	Frontera	75,242
8	Matamoros	Matamoros	59,762
9	Sabinas	Sabinas	59,196
10	San Pedro	San Pedro	49,490

Religion in Coahuila (2010 census)
Roman Catholicism	80.4%
Other Christian	12.0%
Other Religion	0.0%
No religion	5.5%
Unspecified	2.1%

Historical population
Year	Pop.	±%
1787	15,287	—
1815	50,600	+231.0%
1895	242,021	+378.3%
1900	296,938	+22.7%
1910	362,092	+21.9%
1921	393,480	+8.7%
1930	436,425	+10.9%
1940	550,717	+26.2%
1950	720,619	+30.9%
1960	907,734	+26.0%
1970	1,114,956	+22.8%
1980	1,557,265	+39.7%
1990	1,972,340	+26.7%
1995	2,173,775	+10.2%
2000	2,298,070	+5.7%
2005	2,495,200	+8.6%
2010	2,748,391	+10.1%
2015	2,954,915	+7.5%
2020	3,146,771	+6.5%

The last population census run across Mexico in the year 2020, reports Coahuila de Zaragoza as having 3,146,771 inhabitants, which, considering its size, means that the state has a very low density, in fact as low as only 15 persons per square kilometer.

Coahuila's population is mainly made up of Mestizos. Fewer than 7,500 natives reside in Coahuila, or merely 0.3% of the total population. According to the 2020 Census, 1.46% of Coahuila's population identified as Black, Afro-Mexican, or of African descent.

The rest of the demographic particulars in the state are very similar to national averages, such as a high life expectancy (reaching 75 years of age) and a Catholic majority.

== Education ==
- Basic education

Basic public education in Coahuila is mainly managed by the state's Secretary of Education, but federal-sustained schools are also very common. There are also a lot of private schools in the main cities of the state.

- Higher education

Some of the most recognized universities in Coahuila include:

  - Iberoamerican University of Torreón|Iberoamerican University (Universidad Iberoamericana)

A private university part of the Jesuit University System with a campus in Torreón and a university extension center in Saltillo.

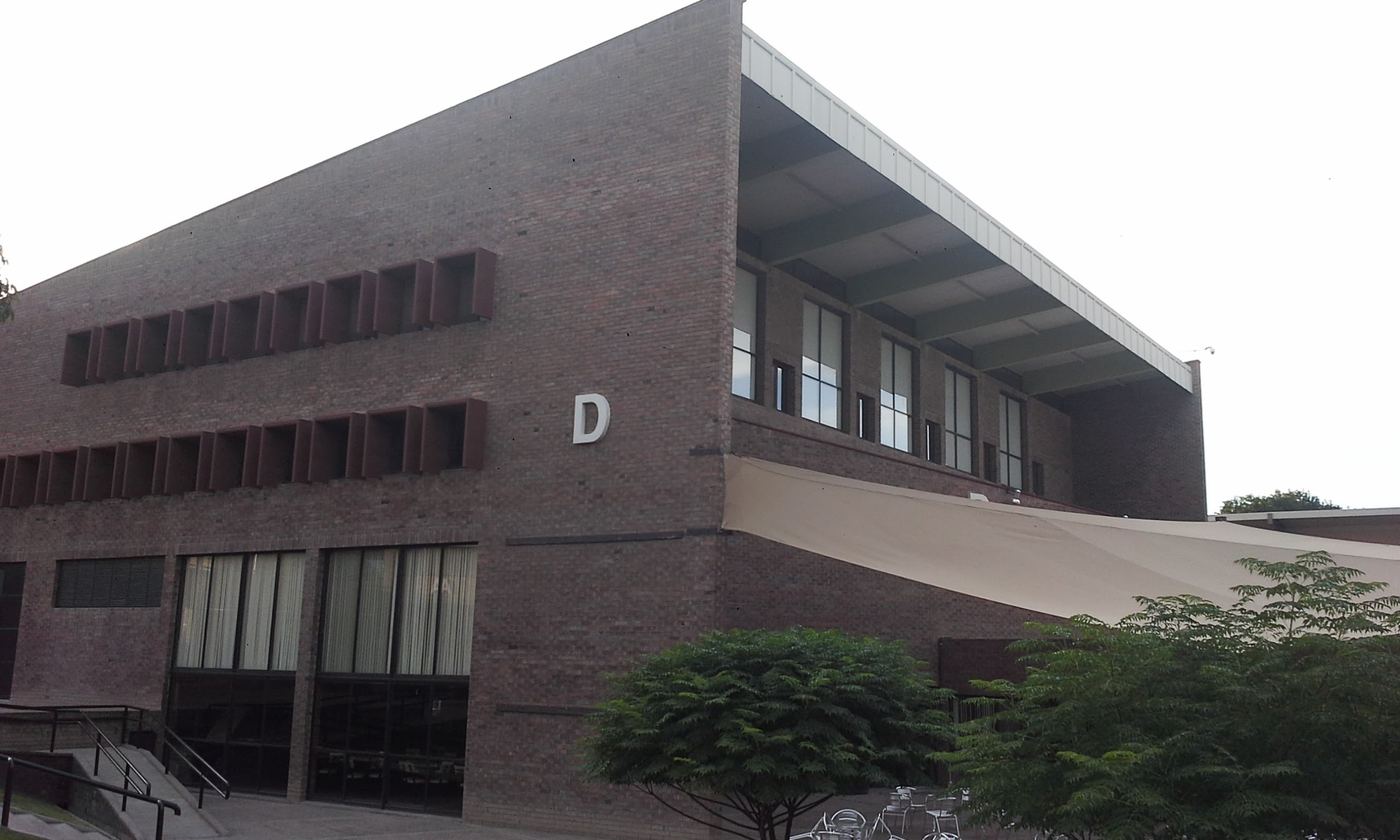
Building at the Iberoamerican University

  - Technological Institute of La Laguna (Instituto Tecnológico de la Laguna)

The most recognized public technological university of La Laguna Region located in the city of Torreón.

  - Technological Institute of Saltillo (Instituto Tecnológico de Saltillo)
  - Monterrey Institute Of Technology and Higher Studies

It is the most known technological university in Mexico with two campuses: one in Saltillo and another one in Torreón.

  - Autonomous University of La Laguna
  - Antonio Narro Agrarian Autonomous University (UAAAN)
  - Autonomous University of Coahuila (Universidad Autónoma de Coahuila)

It is considered the best public university of the states and it has campuses and schools all across Coahuila.

== Economy ==
About 95% of Mexico's coal reserves are found in Coahuila, which is the country's top mining state.

Saltillo and the Southeast region have one of the largest automobile industry in the country and the major industry in the state, hosting companies such as General Motors and Stellantis assembly plants.

Torreón has Met-Mex Peñoles, a mining company. The city is the world's largest silver producer and Mexico's largest gold producer. It also has Lala, a dairy products company, which produces 40% of Mexico's milk consumption and distribution.

As of 2005, Coahuila's economy represents 3.5% of Mexico's total gross domestic product or US$22,874 million. Coahuila's economy has a strong focus on export oriented manufacturing (i.e. maquiladora / INMEX). As of 2005, 221,273 people are employed in the manufacturing sector. Foreign direct investment in Coahuila was US$143.1 million for 2005. The average wage for an employee in Coahuila is approximately 190 pesos per day.

On the other hand, Coahuila is the Mexican state with the highest level of public debt in the nation.

== Municipalities ==
Coahuila is subdivided into five regions and 38 municipalities (municipios).

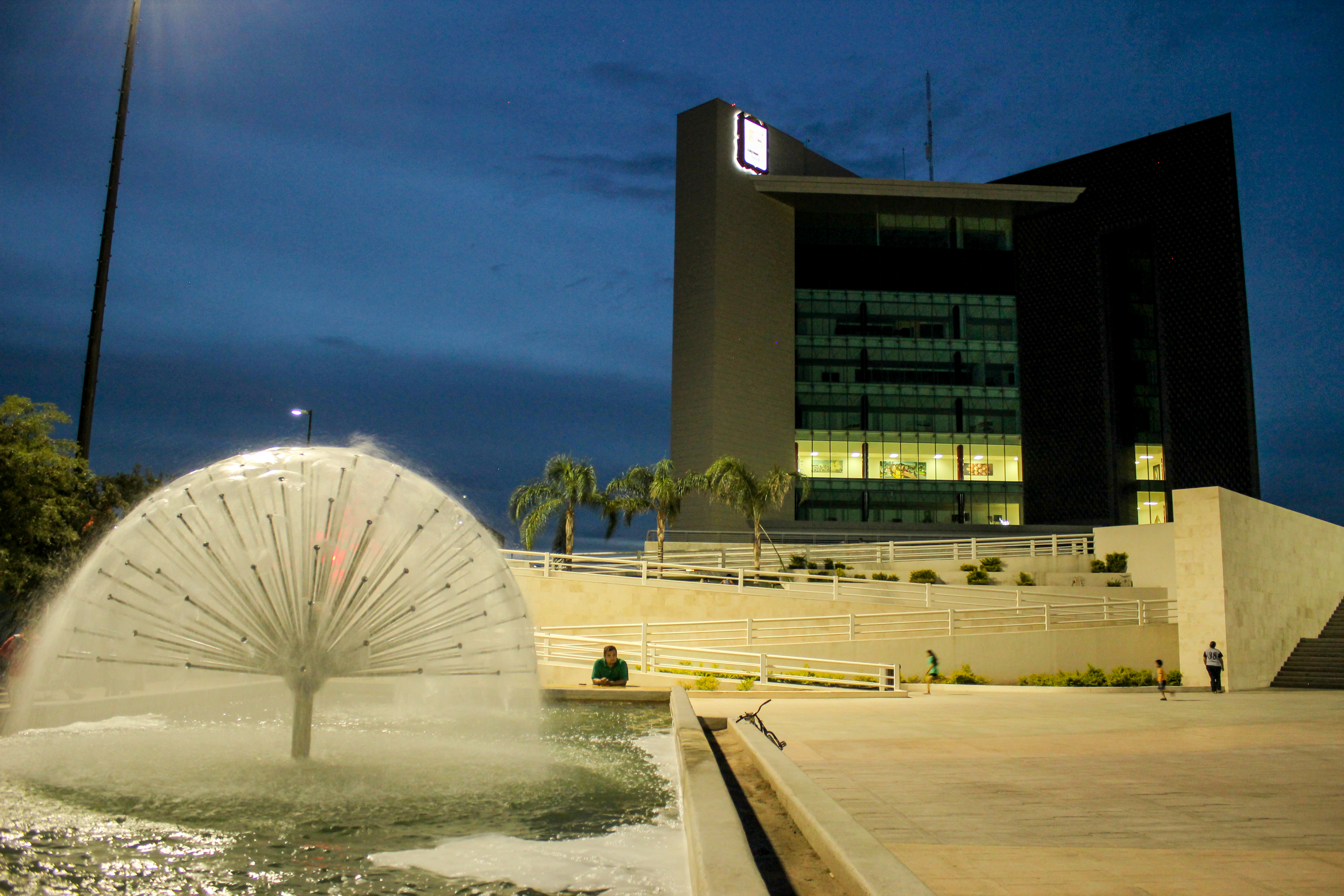
Torreón

== Media ==
Newspapers of Coahuila include: El Diario de Coahuila, El Guardián, El Heraldo de Saltillo, El Siglo de Torreón, Esto del Norte, La I (Laguna), la I (Saltillo), La Opinión Milenio, La Voz de Coahuila (Monclova), Noticias de El Sol de la Laguna, Vanguardia, Zócalo (Monclova), Zócalo (Piedras Negras), Zócalo El Periódico de Saltillo, and Zócalo Saltillo.

== Politics ==
Coahuila has eight Electoral Districts that elect one deputy each to the Chamber of Deputies.

District	Head town
First Federal Electoral District of Coahuila	Piedras Negras
Second Federal Electoral District of Coahuila	San Pedro de las Colonias
Third Federal Electoral District of Coahuila	Monclova
Fourth Federal Electoral District of Coahuila	Saltillo
Fifth Federal Electoral District of Coahuila	Torreón
Sixth Federal Electoral District of Coahuila	Torreón
Seventh Federal Electoral District of Coahuila	Saltillo
Eighth Federal Electoral District of Coahuila	Ramos Arizpe

== List of governors ==
This list is incomplete

- José María Garza Galán (1886–1893)
- José María Múzquiz (1894)
- Miguel Cárdenas (1894–1909)
- Jesús de Valle (1909–1911)
- Venustiano Carranza (1911–1913)
- Gustavo Espinoza Mireles (1917–1920)
- Luis Gutiérrez Ortíz (1920–1921)
- Arnulfo González (1921–1923)
- Carlos Garza Castro (1923–1925)
- Manuel Pérez Treviño (1925–1929)
- Bruno Neira González (1929–1929)
- Nazario S. Ortiz Garza (1929–1933)
- Jesús Valdez Sánchez (1933–1937)
- Pedro Rodríguez Triana (1937–1941)
- Gabriel Cervera Riza (1941–1941)
- Benecio López Padilla (1941–1945)
- Ignacio Cepeda Dávila (1945–1947)
- Ricardo Ainslie Rivera (1947–1948)
- Paz Faz Risa (1948–1948)
- Raúl López Sánchez (1948–1951)
- Roman Cepeda Flores (1951–1957)
- Raúl Madero González (1957–1963)
- Braulio Fernández Aguirre (1963–1969)
- Eulalio Gutiérrez Treviño (1969–1975)
- Oscar Flores Tapia (1975–1981)
- Francisco José Madero González (1981–1981)
- José de las Fuentes Rodríguez (1981–1987)
- Eliseo Mendoza Berrueto (1987–1993)
- Rogelio Montemayor Seguy (1993–1999)
- Enrique Martínez y Martínez (1999–2005)
- Humberto Moreira Valdés (2005–2011) (Left)
- Jorge Torres López (2011) (Humberto Moreira's substitute)
- Rubén Moreira Valdez (2011–2017)
- Miguel Riquelme Solís (2017–2023)
- Manolo Jiménez Salinas (2023–present)

== People ==
- Raul Allegre - Former football placekicker in the National Football League
- Gladys Pearl Baker - mother of Marilyn Monroe and Berniece Baker Miracle
- Reading Wood Black - Founder of Uvalde, Texas, spent American Civil War years in Coahuila
- Venustiano Carranza - President of Mexico
- Sangre Chicana - Professional wrestler
- Mario Domm - musician and lead singer of Mexican pop band Camila
- Luis Farell - Combat pilot and general
- Eulalio Gutiérrez - President of Mexico
- Rosario Ibarra - Activist, deputy and senator
- Francisco I. Madero - President of Mexico November 1911 – February 1913
- Pablo Montero - Singer and actor
- Sanchez Navarro, large landholding family in the 18th and 19th centuries.
- Oribe Peralta - football player
- Horacio Piña - MLB pitcher
- Marco Antonio Rubio - Professional boxer
- Joakim Soria - MLB closer
- Ari Telch - Actor
- Andrea Villarreal - Feminist and revolutionary
- Dr. Wagner - Professional wrestler
- Dr. Wagner, Jr. - Professional wrestler
- Susana Zabaleta - singer and actress
- Humberto Zurita - Actor, director and producer
- Demian Bichir - Actor, director and Academy Award nominee

== See also ==
- Coahuila y Tejas
- Nueva Extremadura
- Nueva Vizcaya
- State Anthem of Coahuila
- States of Mexico
