= Matamoros Municipality, Chihuahua =

Municipality in the Mexican state of Chihuahua

Matamoros
- Municipality
- Municipality of Matamoros in Chihuahua

- Location in Mexico
- Coordinates: 26°45′49″N 105°34′56″W
- Country: Mexico
- State: Chihuahua
- Municipal seat: Mariano Matamoros

Area
  - Total: 1,139.5 km^{2} (440.0 sq mi)

Population (2010)
  - Total: 4,499
  - Density: 3.948/km^{2} (10.23/sq mi)

Matamoros is one of the 67 municipalities of Chihuahua, in northern Mexico. The municipal seat lies at Mariano Matamoros (aka "Villa Matamoros"). The municipality covers an area of 1,139.5 km^{2}.

As of 2010, the municipality had a total population of 4,499, up from 4,304 as of 2005.

The municipality had 109 localities, the largest of which (with 2010 population in parentheses) was: Mariano Matamoros (2,615), classified as urban.

== Geography ==
=== Towns and villages ===
The municipality has 46 localities. The largest are:

Name	Population (2005)
Mariano Matamoros	2,256
El Veranito	509
Santa Rosalía	345
Ciénega de Ceniceros	312
Total Municipality	4,304
