= Torreón =

City in the Mexican state of Coahuila

Torreón, Coahuila
- City
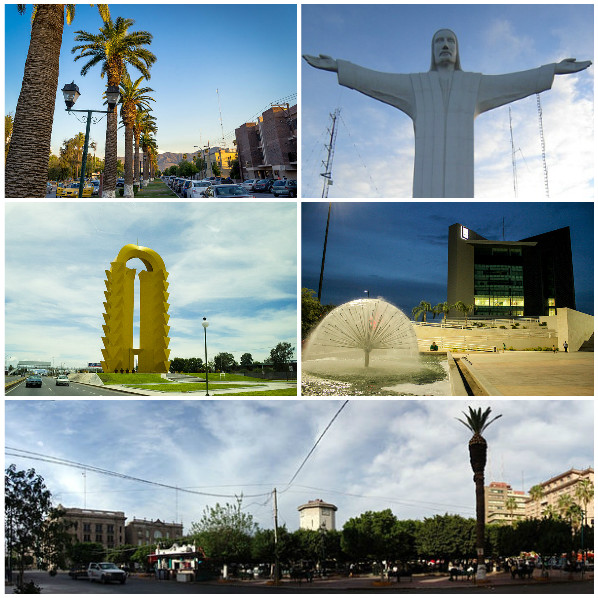
- From top to bottom from left to right: the Alameda Ignacio Zaragoza, the Cristo de las Noas, the Puerta de Torreón, the Plaza Mayor and the Plaza de Armas in the Historic Center

- Flag Coat of arms
- Nickname: La Ciudad de los Grandes Esfuerzos (The City of the Big Efforts)
- Location in Mexico Torreón, Coahuila (Mexico)
- Coordinates: 25°32′31″N 103°24′30″W
- Country: Mexico
- State: Coahuila
- Municipality: Torreón
- Established: September 25, 1893
- Declared city: September 15, 1907

Government
  - Mayor: Roman Alberto Cepeda (Institutional Revolution Party PRI) (2022–2024)

Area
  - Land: 140 km^{2} (54 sq mi)
- Elevation: 1,120 m (3,670 ft)

Population
  - Municipality: 735,340 (2021)
  - Rank: 25th in Mexico; 10th (Agglomeration)
  - Density: 5,200/km^{2} (13,000/sq mi)
  - Urban: 1,328,522
  - Metro: 1,434,283

GDP (PPP, constant 2015 values)
  - Year: 2023
  - Total (Metro): $54.9 billion
  - Per capita: $30,800
- Time zone: UTC−06:00 (Zona Centro)
- Postal code: 27000
- Area code: +52 871
- Website: Official site

Torreón (Spanish pronunciation: [toreˈon]) is a city and seat of Torreón Municipality in the Mexican state of Coahuila. The city's population is 720,848 inhabitants, making it the second largest city in the state of Coahuila. Torreón is part of the Comarca Lagunera metropolitan area. It borders the cites of Gómez Palacio and Lerdo to the west.

The area was originally a center for ranching. With irrigation, the city became an important center for farming and the processing of cotton. The city's economy is based on the metals, livestock, agriculture industries, the textile, metallurgical, chemical, commerce and industries. It is one of the youngest cities in Mexico, having celebrated its centenary in 2007. It is popularly nicknamed "The City of Great Efforts" because despite all the adverse environmental conditions, it managed to flourish as a city due to its prosperous industry and commerce.

Torreón is served by Francisco Sarabia International Airport, an airport with flights to several cities in Mexico and the United States.

== History ==
According to archaeological findings, the area of Torreón was populated around the 10th millennium BC.

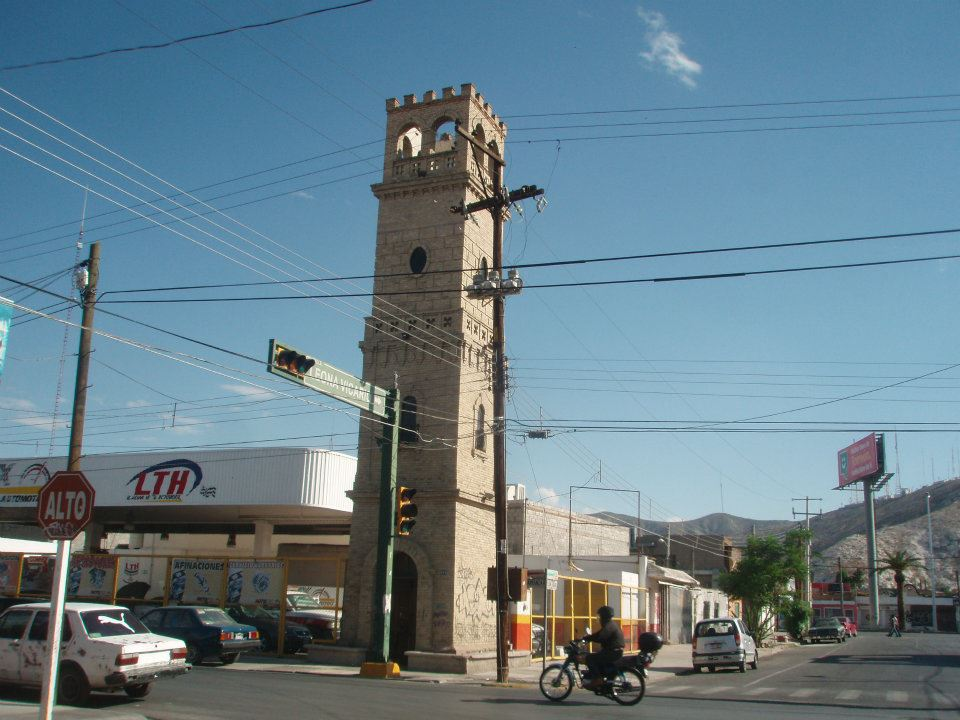
One of the few remaining towers (Torreones) in the city.

The first Spanish mission arrived in 1566, led by Fr. Pedro Espinareda. However, the city developed only in the independent Mexican era, around a Torreón ("Big Tower") built to monitor Río Nazas's floods, in conjunction with the creation of a railroad connecting to the US border city of El Paso, which gave an economic boom to the city and therefore a population boom as well. The population grew from 200 in 1892 to 34,000 in 1910. Torreón received city status in 1907.

During the Mexican Revolution (1910–1920), the city was taken more than once; the most prominent character ever to take the city was the revolutionary general Pancho Villa. It was also the location of the 1911 Torreón massacre, where 303 Chinese immigrants were killed by the revolutionaries over a ten-hour period. During the revolution, Torreón was also the site of an important convention that led to a deal between the rebellious armies. The city is 56 km (35 mi) southwest of historic San Pedro de las Colonias, where some of the Mexican Revolution battles occurred.

After the Mexican Revolution, the city continued to develop economically; during the first years of the 20th century, the primary industry of the city was farming, although other industries later formed or were established in the area.

On September 15, 2007, Torreón celebrated its first 100 years as a chartered city. It held a series of cultural events from September 15, 2006, to September 15, 2007, culminating on the day that the city turned 100 years old.

== Geography ==
Torreón is near the southwest border of the state of Coahuila, within the Laguna region of the state. The border is delineated by the Nazas River that separates it from Gómez Palacio, Durango. The municipality covers 1,947.7 km^{2} (752.0 sq mi), including much of the rural area south of the city. The city's elevation is 1,120 m (3,670 ft), which is low for the Mexican interior. The terrain where the urban area is spread is generally flat, with somewhat prominent relief formations (up to 1,600 m (5,249 ft) south and southwest of the city, thus visible at well-nigh any given point in the city. Higher mountains, over 3,000 m (9,843 ft), are on the southern, mostly uninhabited section of the Municipality, the most prominent being El Picacho.

=== Climate ===
The city features a desert climate (in the Köppen climate classification BWh). Rainfall is scarce but more prominent in the summer, whilst temperatures are very hot by day and cool at night, although the urban heat island effect causes temperatures on summer nights to be considerably warmer than nearby areas. Flora and fauna are those common to semidesert habitats.

Climate data for Torreón (1951–2010)
Month	Jan	Feb	Mar	Apr	May	Jun	Jul	Aug	Sep	Oct	Nov	Dec	Year
Record high °C (°F)	35.0 (95.0)	35.0 (95.0)	40.6 (105.1)	41.2 (106.2)	42.2 (108.0)	45.6 (114.1)	43.5 (110.3)	39.2 (102.6)	38.4 (101.1)	36.0 (96.8)	34.8 (94.6)	34.5 (94.1)	43.0 (109.4)
Mean daily maximum °C (°F)	22.3 (72.1)	25.3 (77.5)	26.0 (78.8)	32.5 (90.5)	35.3 (95.5)	35.4 (95.7)	34.3 (93.7)	33.7 (92.7)	31.8 (89.2)	29.5 (85.1)	26.1 (79.0)	22.8 (73.0)	29.6 (85.3)
Daily mean °C (°F)	14.5 (58.1)	17.0 (62.6)	19.0 (66.2)	24.1 (75.4)	27.2 (81.0)	28.1 (82.6)	27.4 (81.3)	27.0 (80.6)	25.2 (77.4)	22.4 (72.3)	18.2 (64.8)	15.1 (59.2)	22.1 (71.8)
Mean daily minimum °C (°F)	6.8 (44.2)	8.6 (47.5)	11.9 (53.4)	15.6 (60.1)	19.0 (66.2)	20.8 (69.4)	20.5 (68.9)	20.3 (68.5)	18.6 (65.5)	15.2 (59.4)	10.3 (50.5)	7.4 (45.3)	14.6 (58.3)
Record low °C (°F)	−7.0 (19.4)	−5.0 (23.0)	−5.5 (22.1)	1.8 (35.2)	4.0 (39.2)	10.0 (50.0)	11.0 (51.8)	10.0 (50.0)	7.5 (45.5)	−5.0 (23.0)	−18.8 (−1.8)	−20.0 (−4.0)	−20.0 (−4.0)
Average precipitation mm (inches)	20.1 (0.79)	6.5 (0.26)	6.5 (0.26)	14.1 (0.56)	18.8 (0.74)	34.9 (1.37)	24.2 (0.95)	26.5 (1.04)	18.1 (0.71)	11.8 (0.46)	7.9 (0.31)	16.3 (0.64)	205.8 (8.10)
Average precipitation days (≥ 0.1 mm)	2.5	1.1	0.7	1.7	3.3	4.3	5.7	5.0	4.7	2.7	1.5	1.8	34.9
Average relative humidity (%)	55	46	39	39	42	50	53	54	57	55	53	56	50
Mean monthly sunshine hours	176	176	227	239	271	286	293	264	211	237	214	176	2,770
Source 1: Servicio Meteorológico Nacional (humidity 1981–2000)
Source 2: Ogimet (sun 1981–2010)

== Main sights ==
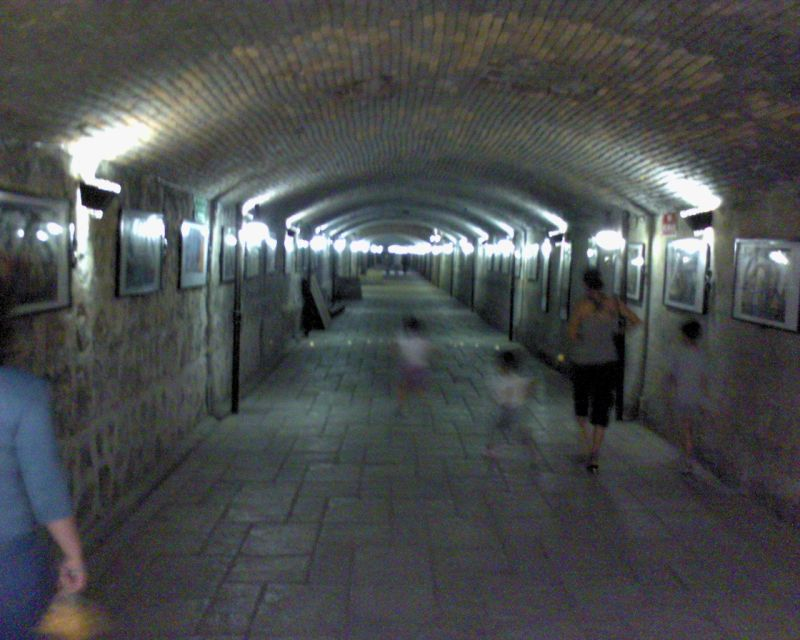
El Canal de la Perla.

Cristo de las Noas, at 21.80 m (71.5 ft), is the third tallest statue of Christ in Latin America, only smaller than the statue of Christ The Redeemer in Brazil and Cristo de la Concordia in Cochabamba, Bolivia. Situated on the top of a hill, this image of Jesus with extended arms symbolises protection for the inhabitants of Torreon. The hilltop has a Catholic church and offers a view of the entire city.

There are also several shopping centers in the city, including Galerias Laguna, Plaza Cuatro Caminos, and Intermall.

The "Canal de la Perla" (the Pearl Watercourse), an underground watercourse built in the 19th century to drive the Nazas' river water to the fields near the city, was re-discovered in 2003 and re-opened in 2014. It now passes under the oldest part of the city and it can be visited and walked through. It is also used for cultural and artistic exhibitions.

In 2006, the "Museo Arocena" (Arocena Museum) that holds art collections from the pre-Hispanic times to the present, was opened; it also has a section dedicated to Mexico's and Torreón's history. There are also temporal expositions, conferences, book fairs, movies, and activities for children.

== Economy ==
The area was originally a center for ranching. With irrigation the city became an important center for support for farming and processing of cotton. In the middle of the 20th century, it became an industrial city. The city has industries in textiles, clothing and metals processing. Some important industries and companies that have business here, like Peñoles, an important Mexican mining group, and Motores John Deere, Lala, an important dairy products company, Yura Corporation, stores like Soriana, Cimaco, Extra, among others.

== Education ==
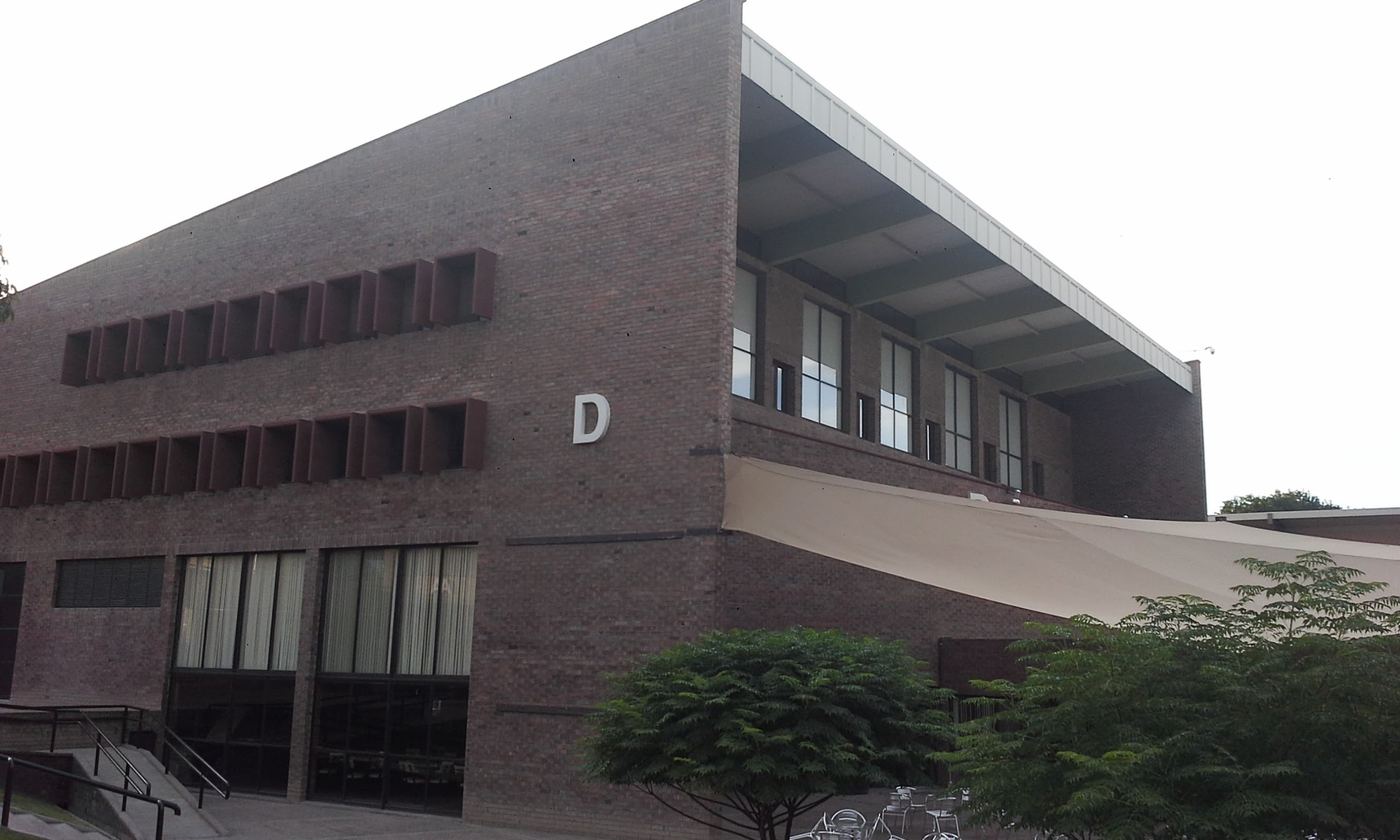
Building at the Iberoamerican University

Torreón and the surrounding comarca are served by several public and private universities. Some of the most recognized institutions in the area are:

- Universidad Autónoma Agraria Antonio Narro (Unidad Laguna (UAAAN))
- Autonomous University of Coahuila (Universidad Autónoma de Coahuila (UAdeC))
- Universidad Autónoma de la Laguna
- Autonomous University of the Northeast (Universidad Autónoma del Noreste (UANE))
- Iberoamerican University Torreón (Universidad Iberoamericana Torreón (Ibero))
- Valley of Mexico University (Universidad del Valle de México (UVM))
- Monterrey Institute of Technology and Higher Education (Instituto Tecnológico y de Estudios Superiores de Monterrey (ITESM))
- La Laguna Institute of Technology (Instituto Tecnológico de la Laguna)
- TecMilenio University (Universidad TecMilenio)
- Torreon Institute of Technology (Instituto Tecnológico de Torreón)
- Torreon Technological University (Universidad Tecnológica de Torreón)
- Universidad La Salle México (ULSA), Laguna

== Sports ==
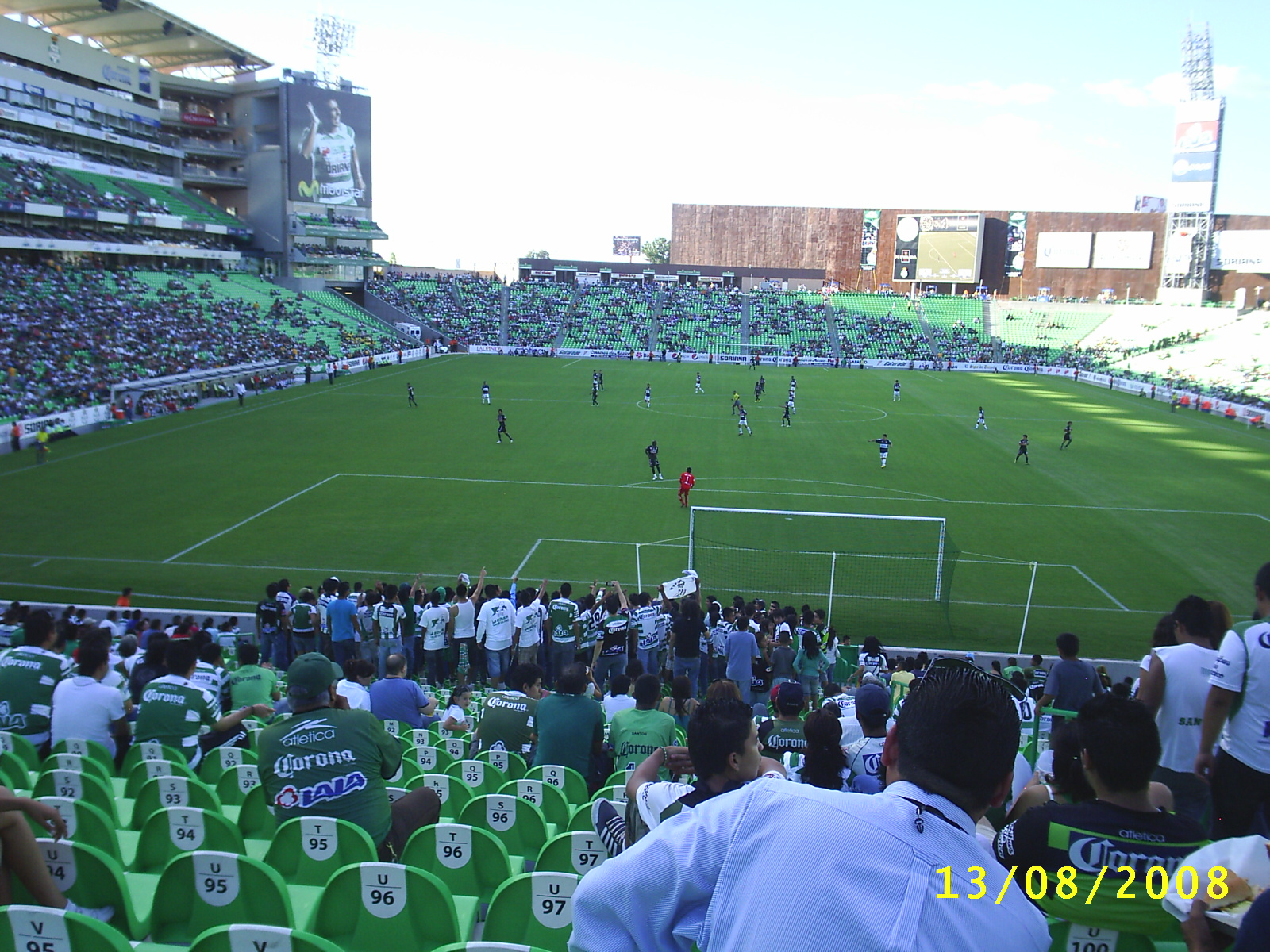
Estadio Corona.

Torreón has a football team in the Liga MX named Santos Laguna. The team won championships in 1996, 2001, 2008, 2012, 2015, and 2018. It used to play in Estadio Corona, until 2009 when it moved to the Territorio Santos Modelo to meet the growing demands of its fan base.

The city is also home to a baseball team called "Vaqueros Laguna" (Laguna Cowboys) of the Mexican League. They play at Estadio Revolución.

Torreón's professional basketball team, Jefes de Fuerza Lagunera, play in the Municipal Auditorium, which seats approximately 3,000 people. They are members of the LNBP (Liga Nacional de Baloncesto Profesional) which is considered to be the top basketball league in Mexico.

Former NFL placekicker and Super Bowl XXI champion, Raul Allegre, is a Torreón native.

== Events ==
=== Cotton and Grape Fair ===
The main annual festival in Torreón is the Cotton and Grape Fair (Feria del Algodón y La Uva) which takes place in September. It contains cultural events, music, food and amusement rides.

=== Independence Day ===
It takes place on September 15 and 16. There are celebrations all around the city, but the most important is the one celebrated in the Plaza Mayor. People wear traditional Mexican clothes, eat traditional dishes and "Antojitos". At night the city mayor makes the traditional celebration of "El Grito". The next day (September 16) there is a parade on the Morelos Avenue.

== Twin towns – sister cities ==
- Reynosa, Mexico
- Culiacan, Mexico
- Hermosillo, Mexico
- Chihuahua, Mexico
- Laredo, United States
- El Paso, United States

== Notable people ==
- Carlos Acevedo, footballer
- Raul Allegre, former NFL Placekicker
- William Andrew Archer, American botanist
- Bandido, professional wrestler
- Mariana Bayón, winner of the first cycle of Mexico's Next Top Model
- Demián Bichir, actor
- Odiseo Bichir, actor
- Black Warrior, wrestler
- Ronaldo Cisneros, footballer
- Carlos Ferro, actor
- Antonia Hernández ,attorney, activist, and philanthropist
- Raúl Méndez, actor
- Ricardo Montalbán, actor
- Pablo Montero, singer
- Oribe Peralta, footballer
- Pilar Rioja, dancer
- Carmen Salinas, actress
- Jorge Sánchez, footballer
- Alberto Vázquez, singer
- Sergio Villarreal Barragán, Mexican drug lord and former leader of Beltrán-Leyva Cartel
- Dr. Wagner Jr., wrestler
- Humberto Zurita, actor
