= Torreón Municipality =

Municipality in the Mexican state of Coahuila

Torreón
- Municipality
- Coat of arms

- Municipality of Torreón in Coahuila
- Coordinates: 25°32′40″N 103°26′33″W
- Country: Mexico
- State: Coahuila
- Municipal seat: Torreón

Area
  - Total: 1,947.7 km^{2} (752.0 sq mi)

Population (2020)
  - Total: 720,848
- Time zone: UTC–06:00 (Zona Centro)

Torreón is one of the municipalities of Coahuila de Zaragoza, a state in north-eastern Mexico. The city of Torreón is the municipal seat. The municipality covers an area of 1947.7 km^{2}.

As of 2020, the municipality had a total population of 720,848.

The municipality of Torreón is divided into two sections, with a southern exclave separated from the main urban area by the municipalities of Lerdo, Matamoros and Viesca.
