= Matamoros Municipality, Coahuila =

Municipality in the Mexican state of Coahuila

Matamoros
- Municipality
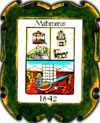
- Coat of arms

- Location in Mexico
- Coordinates: 25°31′41″N 103°13′42″W
- Country: Mexico
- State: Coahuila
- Municipal seat: Matamoros

Area
  - Total: 1,003.7 km^{2} (387.5 sq mi)

Population (2005)
  - Total: 99,707

Matamoros is one of the 38 municipalities of Coahuila, in north-eastern Mexico. The municipal seat lies at Matamoros. The municipality covers an area of 1003.7 km^{2}.

As of 2005, the municipality had a total population of 99,707.
