= 4th federal electoral district of Coahuila =

Federal electoral district of Mexico

Coahuila's 4th
- Electoral district of the Chamber of Deputies of Mexico

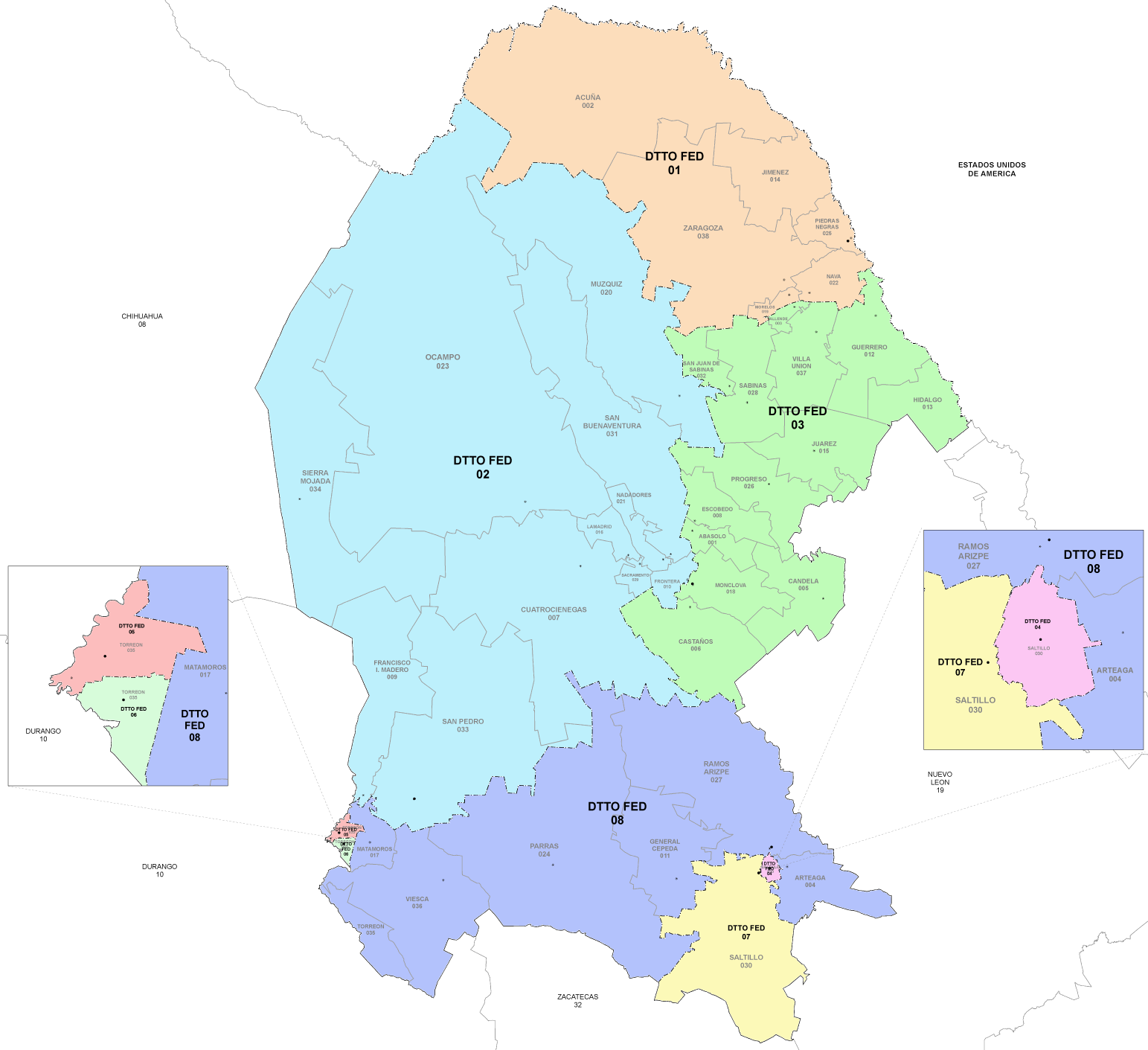
- 4th district since 2022

Incumbent
- Member: Jericó Abramo Masso
- Party: ▌Institutional Revolutionary Party
- Congress: 66th (2024–2027)

District
- State: Coahuila
- Head town: Saltillo
- Coordinates: 25°25′N 100°59′W
- Covers: Municipality of Saltillo (part)
- PR region: Second
- Precincts: 187
- Population: 443,238 (2020 census)

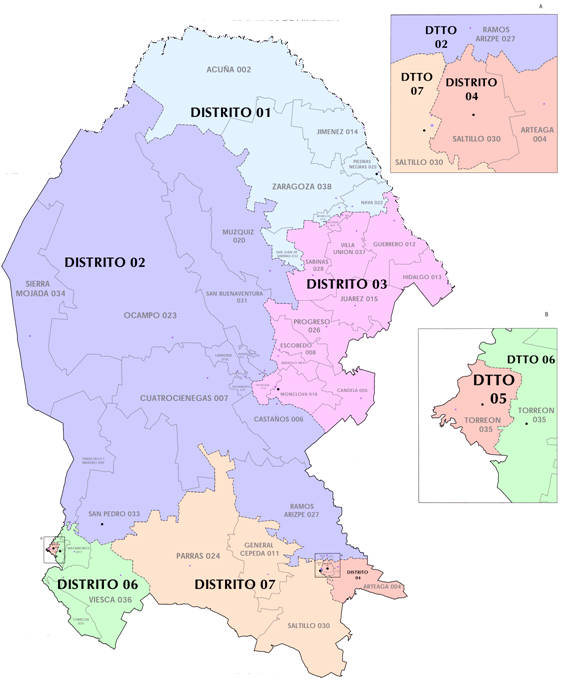
Coahuila under the 2017–2022 districting plan

The 4th federal electoral district of Coahuila (Spanish: Distrito electoral federal 04 de Coahuila) is one of the 300 electoral districts into which Mexico is divided for elections to the federal Chamber of Deputies and one of eight such districts in the state of Coahuila.

It elects one deputy to the lower house of Congress for each three-year legislative session using the first-past-the-post system. Votes cast in the district also count towards the calculation of proportional representation ("plurinominal") deputies elected from the second region.

The current member for the district, re-elected in the 2024 general election, is Jericó Abramo Masso of the Institutional Revolutionary Party (PRI).

== District territory ==
In its 2023 districting plan, which is to be used for the 2024, 2027 and 2030 federal elections, the National Electoral Institute (INE) assigned Coahuila an additional district. The reconfigured 4th district covers 187 electoral precincts (secciones electorales) in the north-eastern, urban portion of the municipality of Saltillo. (Note: The remainder of the municipality is assigned to the 7th district)

The district's head town (cabecera distrital), where results from individual polling stations are gathered together and tallied, is the state capital, the city of Saltillo. The district reported a population of 443,238 in the 2020 census.

== Previous districting schemes ==
Evolution of electoral district numbers
	1974	1978	1996	2005	2017	2023
Coahuila	4	7	7	7	7	8
Chamber of Deputies	196	300				

2017–2022

Between 2017 and 2022, the district covered a part of the municipality of Saltillo and the whole of the neighbouring municipality of Arteaga. The head town was at Saltillo.

2005–2017

Between 2005 and 2017, the district covered the eastern portion of the municipality of Saltillo, with the city of Saltillo serving as the head town.

1996–2005

Under the 1996 scheme, the district covered the north-eastern portion of the city of Saltillo – the head town – together with the municipalities of Arteaga, General Cepeda, Parras and Ramos Arizpe.

1978–1996

The districting scheme in force from 1978 to 1996 was the result of the 1977 electoral reforms, which increased the number of single-member seats in the Chamber of Deputies from 196 to 300. Under that plan, Coahuila's seat allocation rose from 4 to 7. Located in the north of the state, the 4th district had its head town at Piedras Negras and it covered the municipalities of Acuña, Jiménez, Morelos, Nava, Piedras Negras, Sabinas and Zaragoza.

== Deputies returned to Congress ==
(Mexico) National parties
- Current
- PAN
- PRI
- PT
- PVEM
- MC
- Morena
- PAZ
- Somos
- Defunct or local only
- PLM
- PNR
- PRM
- PNM
- PP
- PPS
- PARM
- PFCRN
- CON
- PANAL
- PSD
- PES
- PES
- PRD

Coahuila's 4th district
Election	Deputy	Party	Term	Legislature
1916	Jorge Von Versen		1916–1917	Constituent Congress of Querétaro
1917	Aureliano Esquivel Casas	PLC	1917–1918	27th Congress
1918	Jesús Rodríguez de La Fuente		1918–1920	28th Congress
1920	Manuel H. Flores	Laborist Party (Mexico)	1920–1922	29th Congress
1922	Enrique Breceda	Laborist Party (Mexico)	1922–1924	30th Congress
1924	Elpidio Rodríguez	Laborist Party (Mexico)	1924–1926	31st Congress
1926	Elpidio Barrera	Institutional Revolutionary Party	1926–1928	32nd Congress
1928	Alfredo I. Moreno		1928–1930	33rd Congress
1930	Raymundo Cervera		1930–1932	34th Congress
1932	Severo Jiménez Cadena	Institutional Revolutionary Party	1932–1934	35th Congress
1934	Carlos Garza Castro		1934–1937	36th Congress
1937	Emilio N. Acosta		1937–1940	37th Congress
1940	Carlos Samaniego G.		1940–1943	38th Congress
1943	Secundino Ramos y Ramos	Institutional Revolutionary Party	1943–1946	39th Congress
1946	Federico Meza Zúñiga	Institutional Revolutionary Party	1946–1949	40th Congress
1949	Ramón Quintana Espinoza	Institutional Revolutionary Party	1949–1952	41st Congress
1952	Feliciano Morales Ramos	Institutional Revolutionary Party	1952–1955	42nd Congress
1955	Antonio Hernández Méndez	Institutional Revolutionary Party	1955–1958	43rd Congress
1958	Daniel Hernández Medrano	Institutional Revolutionary Party	1958–1961	44th Congress
1961	Esteban Guzmán Vázquez	Institutional Revolutionary Party	1961–1964	45th Congress
1964	Mauro Berrueto Ramón	Institutional Revolutionary Party	1964–1967	46th Congress
1967	Feliciano Morales Ramos	Institutional Revolutionary Party	1967–1970	47th Congress
1970	Salvador Hernández Vela	Institutional Revolutionary Party	1970–1973	48th Congress
1973	J. Jesús López González	Institutional Revolutionary Party	1973–1976	49th Congress
1976	Julián Muñoz Uresti	Institutional Revolutionary Party	1976–1979	50th Congress
1979	Ángel López Padilla	Institutional Revolutionary Party	1979–1982	51st Congress
1982	Lucio Lozano Ramírez	Institutional Revolutionary Party	1982–1985	52nd Congress
1985	Rodolfo Alfredo Jiménez Villarreal	Institutional Revolutionary Party	1985–1988	53rd Congress
1988	Rogelio Montemayor Seguy (Note: Montemayor took leave of his seat in 1990 to contend for a Senate seat in the 1991 mid-terms.); Carlos Fermín Juaristi Septién	Institutional Revolutionary Party	1988–1990; 1990–1991	54th Congress
1991	Jesús María Ramón Valdés	Institutional Revolutionary Party	1991–1994	55th Congress
1994	Marco Antonio Dávila Montesinos	Institutional Revolutionary Party	1994–1997	56th Congress
1997	Horacio Veloz Muñoz	Institutional Revolutionary Party	1997–2000	57th Congress
2000	Ernesto Saro Boardman; María Teresa Romo Castillón	National Action Party (Mexico)	2000–2002; 2002–2003	58th Congress
2003	Óscar Pimentel González (Note: Pimentel requested indefinite leave from Congress on 17 November 2005.); Norma Dávila Salinas	Institutional Revolutionary Party	2003–2005; 2005–2006	59th Congress
2006	Jericó Abramo Masso	Institutional Revolutionary Party	2006–2009	60th Congress
2009	Rubén Moreira Valdez; Diana Patricia González Soto	Institutional Revolutionary Party	2009–2010; 2010–2012	61st Congress
2012	Fernando de las Fuentes	Institutional Revolutionary Party	2012–2015	62nd Congress
2015	Armando Luna Canales	Institutional Revolutionary Party	2015–2018	63rd Congress
2018	Martha Garay Cadena	Institutional Revolutionary Party	2018–2021	64th Congress
2021	Jericó Abramo Masso	Institutional Revolutionary Party	2021–2024	65th Congress
2024	Jericó Abramo Masso	Institutional Revolutionary Party	2024–2027	66th Congress

== Presidential elections ==
Coahuila's 4th district
Election	District won by	Party or coalition	%
2018	Andrés Manuel López Obrador	Juntos Haremos Historia	37.0400
2024	Claudia Sheinbaum Pardo	Sigamos Haciendo Historia	45.8491
