= Humberto Moreira =

Mexican politician

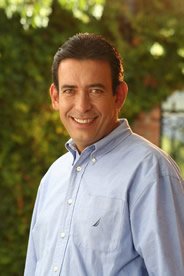

President of the Institutional Revolutionary Party
- In office 4 March 2011 – 2 December 2011
- Preceded by: Beatriz Paredes Rangel
- Succeeded by: Cristina Díaz

26th Governor of Coahuila
- In office 17 February 2005 – 4 January 2011
- Preceded by: Enrique Martínez y Martínez
- Succeeded by: Jorge Torres López

Municipal president of Saltillo
- In office 1 January 2003 – 15 January 2005
- Preceded by: Óscar Pimentel González
- Succeeded by: Fernando de las Fuentes

Personal details
- Born: 28 July 1966 (age 59) Saltillo, Coahuila
- Party: PRI
- Spouse: Vanessa Guerrero Martínez
- Profession: Educator, politician

Humberto Moreira Valdés (born 28 July 1966) is a Mexican politician who served as President of the Institutional Revolutionary Party. He was Governor of the State of Coahuila from 2005 to 2011.

Moreira was included in a list of the "10 most corrupt Mexicans" published by Forbes in 2013. Through his lawyer, Moreira attempted to have his name removed from the list. Moreira was arrested by the government of Spain in January 2016 on suspicion of money laundering.

== Early life ==
Moreira was born in Saltillo, Coahuila. He graduated in 1985, from Escuela Normal de Coahuila obtaining a teaching degree in Primary Education. Graduated with a B.A. in Middle School Education, from the Escuela Normal Superior de Coahuila, specializing in Social Sciences. Numerous Diplomas: Diploma of Political Analysis, from the Universidad Iberoamericana, Diploma of Public Policy, from the Instituto Nacional de Administración Pública, Diploma of Applied Community Sociology, from the Universidad Iberoamericana.

== Career in education ==
In 1985, Moreira began his teaching career as a teacher in the Technical Secondary School Abel Suárez de León. In 1988, he moved to Mexico City where he continued his professional career by occupying low level positions in the Secretariat of Public Education as: Teacher in the Center for Investigation and Professional Development of Educators, Chief of the Department of Human Resources in the General Directive offices for Normal School Education and Teacher Training, Private Secretary for the General Director of the Department of Education and Teacher Training, Director of Connecting Links between the Federative Entities of the Emerging Program for Teacher Training, and Private Secretary for the Undersecretary of Primary Education.

In 1994, was appointed as: Delegate in Coahuila of the National Council for the Promotion of Education, Delegate in Coahuila of the National Institute for Adult Education, and then he was appointed the Secretary of Public Education for the State of Coahuila from 1999 to 2002.

== Political career ==
He served as municipal president of Saltillo from 1 January 2003 to 15 June 2005.

=== Governor of Coahuila ===
On 17 July 2005 is designated as candidate of his party (PRI) for the Government of Coahuila and on 25 September 2005, Moreira was elected Governor of the State of Coahuila, by obtaining record votes and winning in a landslide.

On 1 December 2005, he took office as Governor of the State of Coahuila de Zaragoza serving as Governor for the 2005–2011 term. His administration adopted as official motto "The Government of the People."

=== President of PRI ===
He held the Governorship of the State of Coahuila until 3 January 2011, when the Congress of Coahuila granted license status to participate in the process of renewing the national leadership of the PRI.

On 8 January 2011, the National Commission for Internal Processes record gave him the constance of majority of votes and named him president-elect.

On 4 March 2011, he took office as the President of the Institutional Revolutionary Party succeeding Beatriz Paredes Rangel. In early June, he was involved in a controversy due to an underling of his suddenly becoming a rich man in the USA.

As of 23 August, it was revealed that during his administration, the debt of the state increased more than hundred-fold, amidst allegations of opacity in the management of public finances. Debt increased from around $27 million to $2.8 billion in just five years, which in addition to the misinformation surrounding the amount owed (previously stated as being 700 million dollars) led to Coahuila's credit rating being downgraded by Standard & Poor's from A+ to BBB−, a downgrade of six levels. It has been confirmed that apocryphal documentation was issued to get the loans and that he was aware and actively participating when credits were granted to the State using fake documentation.

According to the newspaper Milenio, the PGR does not currently have enough evidence to charge Moreira; however, the PGR has not confirmed this publicly.

=== Controversies ===
During his tenure as governor of Coahuila, Moreira signed decrees where the state acquired a debt of over thirty-three hundred billion pesos, he was accused of using fake documentation to obtain the money, and it is presumed that was used to illegally finance, and win, 5 governorships for the PRI party, and also to finance the presidential campaign of Enrique Peña Nieto. For acquiring this debt the state of Coahuila fell from having an A+ score to a BBB− in the Standard & Poor's index.

On 3 October 2012 his eldest son, José Eduardo, was assassinated.

==== Arrest ====
On 15 January 2016 Humberto Moreira was arrested by the government of Spain in the Barajas Airport, and charged with money laundering and embezzlement. The arrest was done on request of the US government.

It was reported that the Spanish government's anti-corruption prosecutor was investigating the relation between Moreira's money laundering operation and los Zetas drug cartel, and stated that the assassination of Moreira's son in 2012, was in retaliation of a money laundering operation where the Los Zetas cartel did not get their share.

On 22 January 2016 Moreira was granted restricted release on a bail, and is waiting for a trial and the end of the investigation.

== Private life ==
His parents are Rubén Moreira and Evangelina Valdés. He has been married three times, and is the father of five children.

== See also ==
- 2002 Coahuila state election
- 2005 Coahuila state election
- List of presidents of Saltillo Municipality

Political offices
Preceded by Beatriz Paredes Rangel	President of the Institutional Revolutionary Party; 4 March 2011 – 2 December 2011	Succeeded by Cristina Díaz
Preceded by Enrique Martínez y Martínez	Governor of Coahuila; 2005–2011	Succeeded by Jorge Torres López
Preceded by Óscar Pimentel González	Mayor of Saltillo; 2002–2005	Succeeded by Ismael Eugenio Ramos Flores
