= Fernando de las Fuentes =

Mexican politician

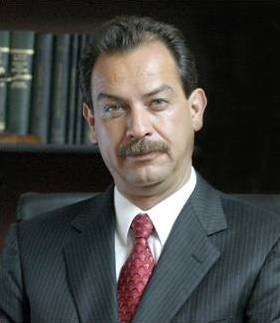

Member of the Chamber of Deputies for Coahuila′s 7th district
- In office 1 September 2018 – 4 January 2021
- Preceded by: Jericó Abramo Masso
- Succeeded by: Sergio Armando Sisbeles Alvarado
- In office 1 September 2003 – 18 July 2005
- Preceded by: Miguel Arizpe Jiménez
- Succeeded by: Aldo Martínez Hernández

Member of the Chamber of Deputies for Coahuila's 4th district
- In office 1 September 2012 – 31 August 2015
- Preceded by: Diana Patricia González Soto
- Succeeded by: Armando Luna Canales

Member of the Congress of Coahuila for the 1st district
- In office 1 January 2009 – 31 December 2011
- Preceded by: Guadalupe Sergio Resendiz Boone
- Succeeded by: Jorge Alanís Canales

Municipal President of Saltillo
- In office 1 January 2006 – 17 July 2008
- Preceded by: Ismael Eugenio Ramos Flores
- Succeeded by: Jorge Torres López

Member of the Congress of Coahuila for the 2nd district
- In office 1 January 2000 – 31 December 2002
- Preceded by: Rafael Rico González
- Succeeded by: Hilda Esthela Flores Escalera

Personal details
- Born: 7 August 1960 (age 65) Saltillo, Coahuila
- Political party: Institutional Revolutionary
- Parent(s): José de las Fuentes; Elsa Hernández Salazar
- Occupation: Lawyer

Fernando de las Fuentes Hernández (born August 7, 1960) is a Mexican lawyer, entrepreneur and politician, affiliated with the Institutional Revolutionary Party (PRI).

== Personal life and education ==
De las Fuentes was born to José de las Fuentes Rodríguez and Elsa Hernández. He studied law in the Universidad Autónoma de Coahuila. He is married to Patricia Arizpe with whom he has three children; Maria Fernanda, Raul Alberto and Jorge Arturo.

== Political career ==
He began his career in Public Administration as Secretary of the Joint Agricultural Committee of the State of Mexico (1988 to 1990). In December 1993 he was appointed Director General of the State Tourism Development, to in 1997 to be in charge of the Directorate of Public Relations Executive.

By choice of the citizens of the Local II District of Saltillo joined the LV state Legislature to Congress, were coordinated by the Citizens Commission on Social and Management, and was part of four more committees (1999–2002).

In 2003 he was elected federal deputy to the LIX Legislature of the Mexican Congress for the seventh district of Coahuila, in the Saltillo area, and which belonged to the Commission to Strengthen Federalism and the Secretary of the Housing Commission (2003–2005).

Mayor of Saltillo, capital of the state of Coahuila (2006–2008). In this period the city received an unprecedented transformation in roadways, bridges, vehicle support and a sense of social development in countryside and urban areas coupled with an unprotected beautification of our urban environment.

In 1988, by the people of the I Electoral District got the highest vote achieved by a Local deputy of Saltillo, also serves as Coordinator of the PRI fraction and chairman of the board of Governors of Congress of the State of Coahuila LVIII Legislature.

In 2012, he was elected as federal deputy to the LXII Legislature of the Mexican Congress from the fourth district, located in Saltillo.

== See also ==
- 2005 Coahuila state election
- List of presidents of Saltillo Municipality

Preceded by Ismael Eugenio Ramos Flores	Municipal President of Saltillo, Coahuila; 2005–2007	Succeeded by Jorge Torres López
