= Governor Torres =

Governor Torres may refer to:

- Ignacio Torres (politician) (born 1988), Governor of Chubut Province, Argentina
- Jorge Torres López (born 1954), Governor of Coahuila, Mexico
- Laureano de Torres y Ayala (1645–1725), Governor of La Florida and Cuba
- Mario Marín (politician) (Mario Plutarco Marín Torres, born 1954), Governor of Puebla, Mexico
- Ralph Torres (born 1979), Governor of the Northern Mariana Islands
- Ramon Torres (politician) (1891–1975), Governor of Negros Occidental, Philippines

== See also ==
- Governor Torre (disambiguation)
