= 7th federal electoral district of Coahuila =

Federal electoral district of Mexico

Coahuila's 7th
- Electoral district of the Chamber of Deputies of Mexico

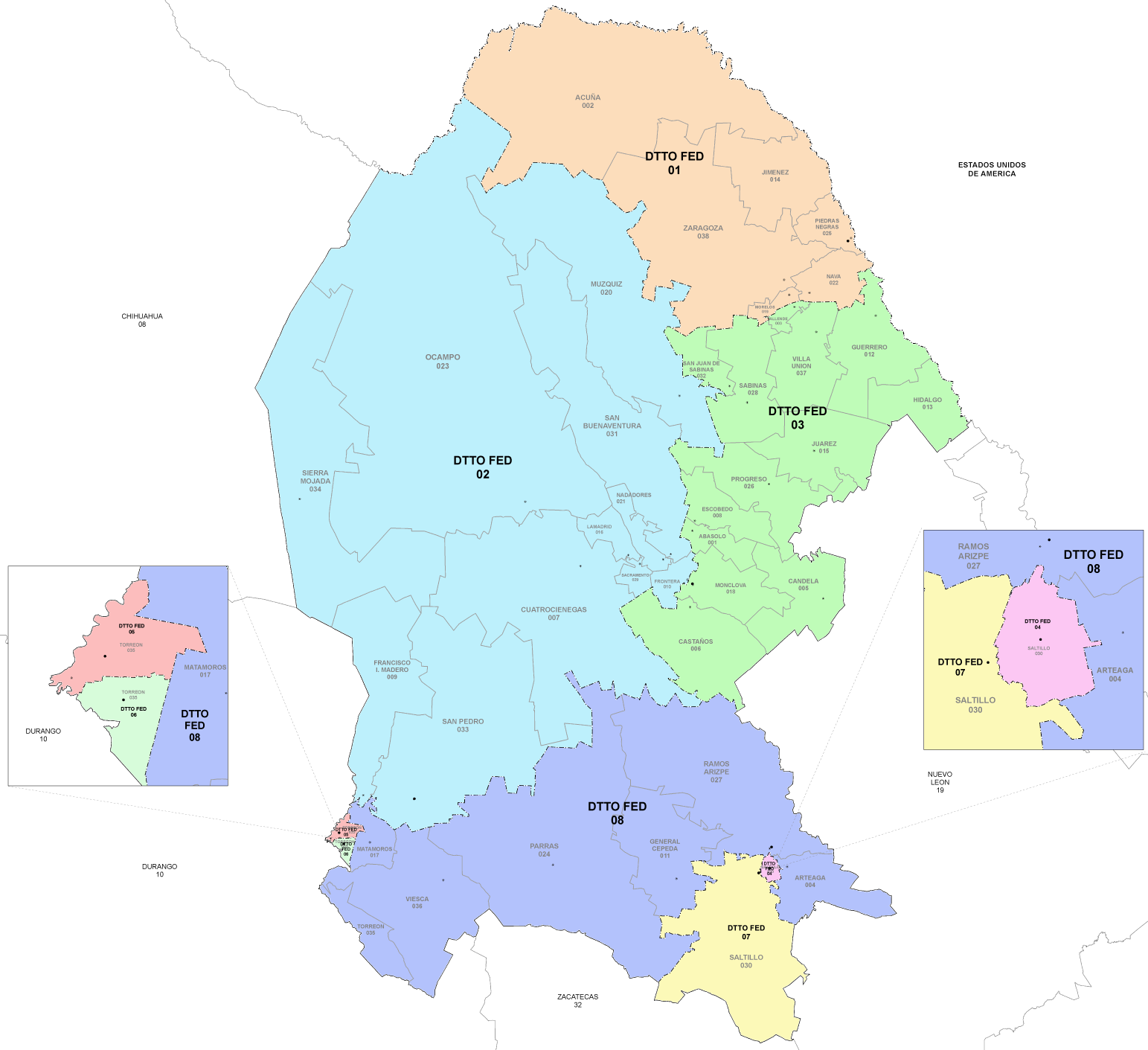
- 7th district since 2022

Incumbent
- Member: Antonio Lorenzo Castro Villarreal
- Party: ▌Morena
- Congress: 66th (2024–2027)

District
- State: Coahuila
- Head town: Saltillo
- Coordinates: 25°25′N 100°59′W
- Covers: Municipality of Saltillo (part)
- PR region: Second
- Precincts: 223
- Population: 441,607 (2020 census)

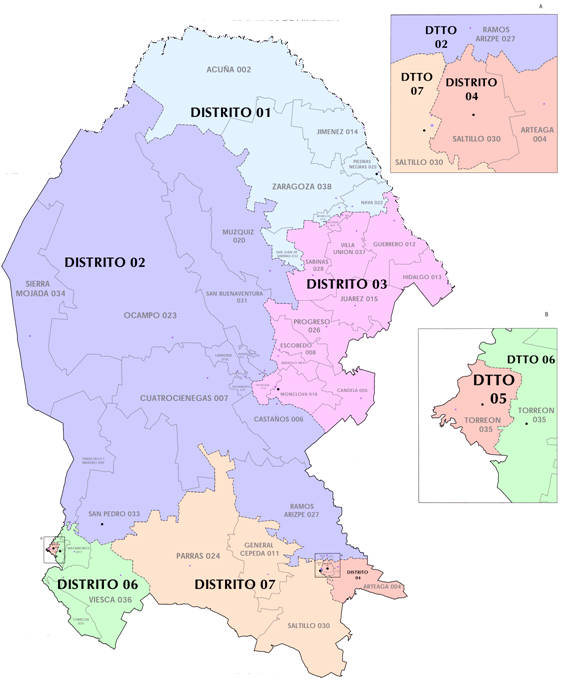
Coahuila under the 2017–2022 districting plan

The 7th federal electoral district of Coahuila (Spanish: Distrito electoral federal 07 de Coahuila) is one of the 300 electoral districts into which Mexico is divided for elections to the federal Chamber of Deputies and one of eight such districts in the state of Coahuila.

It elects one deputy to the lower house of Congress for each three-year legislative session by means of the first-past-the-post system. Votes cast in the district also count towards the calculation of proportional representation ("plurinominal") deputies elected from the second region.

Suspended in 1930, (Note: An amendment to Article 52 of the Constitution in 1928 changed the original provision of "one deputy per 60,000 inhabitants" to "one deputy per 100,000"; as a result, the size of the Chamber of Deputies fell from 281 in the 1928 election to 171 in 1934.) the 7th district was re-established as part of the 1977 political reforms and was first contested in the 1979 mid-term election.

The current member for the district, elected in the 2024 general election, is Antonio Lorenzo Castro Villarreal of the National Regeneration Movement (Morena).

== District territory ==
In its 2022 districting plan, which is to be used for the 2024, 2027 and 2030 federal elections, the National Electoral Institute (INE) assigned Coahuila an additional district. The reconfigured 7th district covers 223 electoral precincts (secciones electorales) in the more rural portion of the municipality of Saltillo. (Note: The 4th district covers the remainder of the municipality.)

The head town (cabecera distrital), where results from individual polling stations are gathered together and tallied, is the state capital, the city of Saltillo. The district reported a population of 441,607 in the 2020 census.

== Previous districting schemes ==
Evolution of electoral district numbers
	1974	1978	1996	2005	2017	2023
Coahuila	4	7	7	7	7	8
Chamber of Deputies	196	300				

2017–2022

Between 2017 and 2022, the district covered 220 precincts in the municipality of Saltillo and the municipalities of General Cepeda and Parras in their entirety. The head town was at Saltillo.

2005–2017

Under the 2005 districting scheme, the district covered 171 precincts in the west of the municipality of Saltillo. The head town was at Saltillo.

1996–2005

Under the 1996 scheme, the district covered the south-west portion of the city of Saltillo and the southern part of its municipality. Saltillo was the head town.

1978–1996

The districting scheme in force from 1978 to 1996 was the result of the 1977 electoral reforms, which increased the number of single-member seats in the Chamber of Deputies from 196 to 300. Under that plan, Coahuila's seat allocation rose from 4 to 7. The 7th district had its head town at San Pedro de las Colonias and it comprised the municipalities of Cuatrociénegas, Lamadrid, Múzquiz, Ocampo, Sacramento, San Juan de Sabinas, San Pedro and Sierra Mojada.

== Deputies returned to Congress ==
(Mexico) National parties
- Current
- PAN
- PRI
- PT
- PVEM
- MC
- Morena
- PAZ
- Somos
- Defunct or local only
- PLM
- PNR
- PRM
- PNM
- PP
- PPS
- PARM
- PFCRN
- CON
- PANAL
- PSD
- PES
- PES
- PRD

Coahuila's 7th district
Election	Deputy	Party	Term	Legislature
1922	Elpidio Barrera		1922–1924	30th Congress
1924	Vacant		1924–1926	31st Congress
1926	Francisco De Valle		1926–1928	32nd Congress
1928	Adolfo Mondragón Bouckhardt		1928–1930	33rd Congress
The seventh district was suspended from 1930 to 1979
1979	Lorenzo García Zárate	Institutional Revolutionary Party	1979–1982	51st Congress
1982	Juan Antonio García Guerrero	Institutional Revolutionary Party	1982–1985	52nd Congress
1985	Gonzalo Padilla Fuentes	Institutional Revolutionary Party	1985–1988	53rd Congress
1988	Noé Fernando Garza Flores	Institutional Revolutionary Party	1988–1991	54th Congress
1991	Javier Guerrero García	Institutional Revolutionary Party	1991–1994	55th Congress
1994	José Luis Flores Méndez	Institutional Revolutionary Party	1994–1997	56th Congress
1997	Enrique Martínez y Martínez; Pilar Cabrera Hernández	Institutional Revolutionary Party	1997–1999; 1999–2000	57th Congress
2000	Miguel Arizpe Jiménez	Institutional Revolutionary Party	2000–2003	58th Congress
2003	Fernando de las Fuentes (Note: De las Fuentes resigned his seat on 18 July 2005.); Aldo Martínez Hernández	Institutional Revolutionary Party	2003–2005; 2005–2006	59th Congress
2006	Óscar Mohamar Dainitín	National Action Party (Mexico)	2006–2009	60th Congress
2009	Héctor Franco López; Lily Fabiola de la Rosa Cortés	Institutional Revolutionary Party	2009–2011; 2011–2012	61st Congress
2012	Esther Quintana Salinas	National Action Party (Mexico)	2012–2015	62nd Congress
2015	Jericó Abramo Masso; Mario Alberto Mata Quintero	Institutional Revolutionary Party	2015–2017; 2018	63rd Congress
2018	Fernando de las Fuentes Hernández; Sergio Armando Sisbeles Alvarado	Institutional Revolutionary Party	2018–2021; 2021	64th Congress
2021	Jaime Bueno Zertuche	Institutional Revolutionary Party	2021–2024	65th Congress
2024	Antonio Lorenzo Castro Villarreal	National Regeneration Movement	2024–2027	66th Congress

== Presidential elections ==
Coahuila's 7th district
Election	District won by	Party or coalition	%
2018	Andrés Manuel López Obrador	Juntos Haremos Historia	41.5028
2024	Claudia Sheinbaum Pardo	Sigamos Haciendo Historia	55.5071
