= Bobadilla =

Bobadilla may refer to:

== People ==
- Bobadilla (surname)

== Places ==
- Bobadilla, Chile, a town in Maule Region, Chile
- Bobadilla, La Rioja, a municipality in La Rioja, Spain
- Bobadilla, Antequera, a village in Andalusia, Spain
  - Bobadilla railway station
- Bobadilla del Campo (or Bobadilla), a municipality in Castile and León, Spain
