= Line Bareiro =

Paraguayan political scientist (1950–2026)

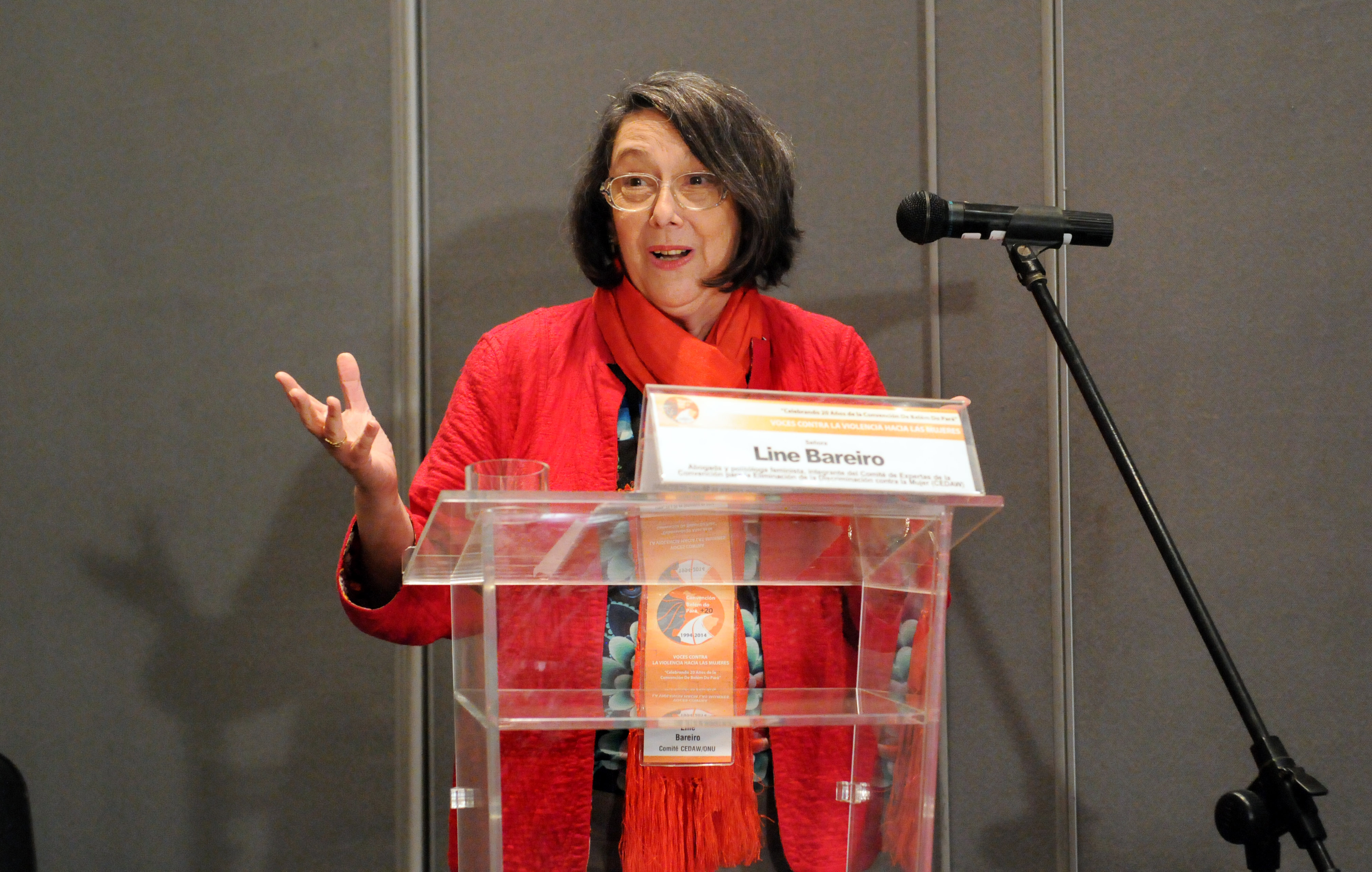
Bareiro in 2014

Olinda María Selva Bareiro Bobadilla, (Note: In this name that follows Hispanic American naming customs, the first or paternal surname is Bareiro and the second or maternal family name is Bobadilla.) (30 August 1950 – 1 August 2026), known as Line Bareiro, was a Paraguayan political scientist, civil rights activist and feminist.

== Life and career ==
Line Bareiro studied at the University of Heidelberg in Germany, gaining a Masters in political science in 1979 and working as a research assistant to Dieter Nohlen. Returning to Paraguay she worked with the NGO Paraguayo de Datos (BPD) until its suppression by Alfredo Stroessner in 1982. She was a founder member of the Centro de Documentación e Estudios in 1985, and active in the women's movement Coordinación de Mujeres del Paraguay (CMP), founded in 1987. After Stroessner's overthrow in 1989, she was a founder member of Decidamos, a citizen advocacy group of NGOs.

In 2010 Bareiro was elected to the UN's Committee on the Elimination of Discrimination against Women (CEDAW), to serve on the committee from 2011 until 2014.

Bareiro died on 1 August 2026, at the age of 75.

== Works ==
- (ed. with Clyde Soto & Mary Monte) Alquimistas: documentos para otra historia de las mujeres, 1993
- (ed. with Ticio Escobar & Saúl Sosnowski) Hacia una cultura para la democracia en el Paraguay, 1994
- (ed. with Celsa Vega) Campesinas frente a la pobreza : condiciones de vida de las familias organizadas de la Cordillera, 1994
- (ed. with Clyde Soto) Ciudadanas: una memoria inconstante, 1997
- (ed.) El costo de la libertad : asesinato y heridas en el marzo paraguayo, 1999
- (with Clyde Soto) Women. In Peter Lambert & Andrew Nickson, The Transition to Democracy in Paraguay, Springer, pp. 87–.
