= Esther Quintana Salinas =

Mexican politician (born 1951)

- Born: 1 July 1951 (age 75); Acapulco, Guerrero, Mexico
- Occupation: Deputy
- Political party: PAN

Esther Quintana Salinas (born 1 July 1951) is a Mexican politician affiliated with the National Action Party (PAN). In 2012–2015 she served as a federal deputy in the 62nd session of Congress, representing Coahuila's seventh district. Between 2009 and 2012 she served in the 58th session of the Congress of Coahuila.
