= Aldo Martínez Hernández =

Mexican politician

- Born: 16 March 1980 (age 46); Coahuila, Mexico
- Occupation: Politician
- Political party: PRI

Aldo Mauricio Martínez Hernández (born 16 March 1980) is a Mexican politician affiliated with the Institutional Revolutionary Party (PRI). In 2005–2006 he served as a federal deputy in the 59th session of Congress, representing Coahuila's seventh district as the substitute of Fernando de las Fuentes who had requested indefinite leave from his seat on 18 July 2005.
