= Héctor López (disambiguation) =

Héctor López (born 1929) is a Panamanian former baseball player.

Hector Lopez may also refer to:

- Héctor López (athlete) (born 1952), Venezuelan Olympic athlete
- Héctor López (boxer) (1967–2011), Olympic Mexican boxer
- Héctor López (volleyball) (born 1971), Spanish former volleyball player
- Héctor Mario López Fuentes (1930–2015), Guatemalan general
- Hector Lopez, fictional character in seasons five and six (2003–2004) of U.S. sitcom Becker
- Héctor Franco López (born 1963), Mexican politician
- Hector Lopéz Alonso (born 1979), Spanish Paralympic swimmer
