= Clyde Soto =

Paraguayan feminist, psychologist and human rights activist

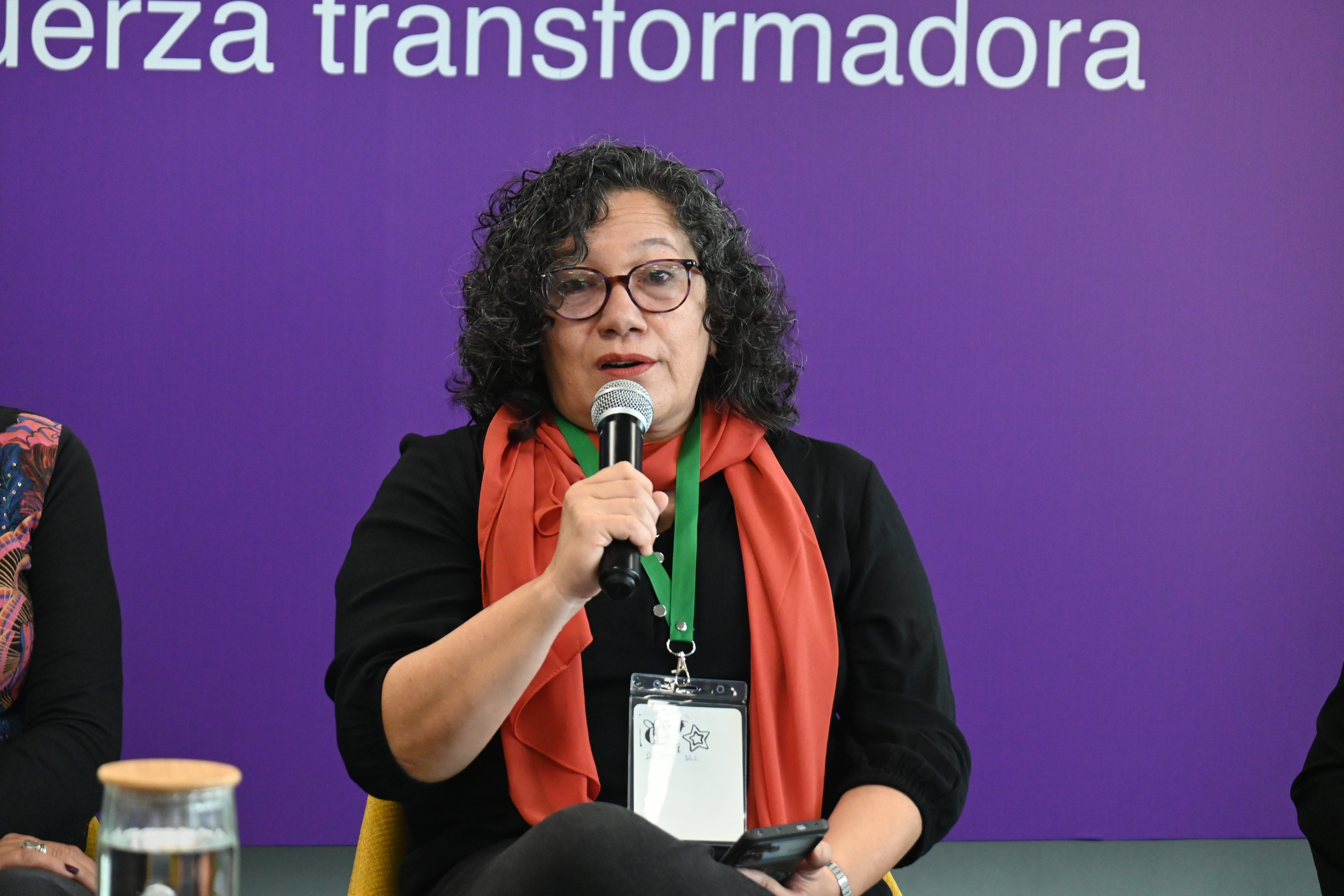
Soto Badaui in 2025

Clyde María Soto Badaui (Note: In this Hispanic American name, the first or paternal surname is Soto and the second or maternal family name is Badaui.) (born 1966) is a Paraguayan feminist, psychologist and human rights activist.

== Life ==
Born in 1966, Clyde Soto has a degree in psychology, which she gained from the Universidad Nacional de Asunción. She also trained in gender studies at the University Institute for Women's Studies of the Autonomous University of Madrid and completed the Regional Training Program in Gender and Public Policies (PRIGEPP) from the Latin American Faculty of Social Sciences (FLACSO).

From 1987 to 1990 she worked in the Social Sciences Group (GCS). Since 1991 Clyde Soto has worked as a researcher at Centro de Documentacion y Estudios (CDE), a non-profit social research and documentation centre in Asunción. She is on the editorial team of Informativo Mujer, published by the CDE, and was Director of the CDE from 1999 to 2001. From 1999 to 2000 she was correspondent in Paraguay for Mujer-Fempress magazine.

Soto is a member of the Coordination of Women of Paraguay (CMP).

In March 2021, Soto was one of those who criticized education minister Juan Manuel Brunetti's appeal to the "traditional family", forcing Brunetti to apologize.

== Works ==
- (with Jorge Silvero Salgueiro) Participación de la mujer en el espacio municipal. Asunción: Mujeres por la Democracia, 1991.
- (ed. with Line Bareiro) Sola no basta: mecanismos para mejorar la participación política de las mujeres. 1992.
- (with Line Bareiro and Mary Monte) Alquimistas: documentos para otra historia de las mujeres. 1993.
- (with Carmen Echauri) Los saberes del poder. 1993.
- (ed. with Line Bareiro) Ciudadanas: una memoria inconstante [Women citizens: an uneven history]. Asunción, Paraguay: Centro de Documentación y Estudios, 1997.
- (with Line Bareiro) Women. In Peter Lambert and Andrew Nickson, eds., The Transition to Democracy in Paraguay. Macmillan Press, 1997, pp.87–96.
