= Noé Fernando Garza Flores =

Mexican politician

- Born: 31 May 1948 (age 78); Coahuila, Mexico
- Education: UANL
- Occupation: Politician
- Political party: PRI

Noé Fernando Garza Flores (born 31 May 1948) is a Mexican politician from the Institutional Revolutionary Party (PRI). He served as a federal deputy in the 54th session of Congress (1988–1991) for Coahuila's seventh district, and in the 61st session (2010–2012) as a plurinominal deputy substituting for Hilda Esthela Flores Escalera. He was also elected to the 53rd session of the Congress of Coahuila.
