= Soto (surname) =

Soto is a Spanish surname.

== Geographical distribution ==
As of 2014, 28.7% of all known bearers of the surname Soto were residents of Mexico (frequency 1:359), 12.0% of Chile (1:122), 10.4% of the United States (1:2,883), 7.2% of Colombia (1:549), 6.9% of Peru (1:380), 6.0% of Venezuela (1:414), 5.0% of Argentina (1:712), 4.2% of Spain (1:927), 3.8% of the Dominican Republic (1:226), 2.4% of Costa Rica (1:164), 2.3% of Guatemala (1:580), 1.7% of Bolivia (1:514), 1.6% of Cuba (1:591), 1.5% of Puerto Rico (1:197), 1.1% of Honduras (1:675) and 1.0% of Mozambique (1:2,325).

In Spain, the frequency of the surname was higher than national average (1:927) in the following autonomous communities:

1. Region of Murcia (1:436)
2. Galicia (1:509)
3. La Rioja (1:597)
4. Andalusia (1:698)
5. Navarre (1:853)
6. Castile and León (1:855)
7. Asturias (1:925)

In Chile, the frequency of the surname was higher than national average (1:122) in the following regions:

1. Los Lagos Region (1:51)
2. Magallanes Region (1:70)
3. Aysén Region (1:79)
4. O'Higgins Region (1:86)
5. Los Ríos Region (1:97)
6. Santiago Metropolitan Region (1:121)

== People ==
- Alberto Soto (footballer, born 1990) (born 1990), Mexican footballer
- Alejandro Morera Soto (1909–1995), Costa Rican footballer
- Apolinar de Jesús Soto Quesada (1827–1911), Costa Rican politician
- Bernardo Soto Alfaro (1854–1931), president of Costa Rica
- Blanca Soto (born 1979), Mexican model
- Caitro Soto (1934–2004), Peruvian musician
- Carlos Soto Arriví (1959–1978), Puerto Rican independence activist
- Cecilia Soto (born 1950), Mexican politician
- Cesar Soto (boxer) (born 1971), Mexican boxer
- Clemente Soto Vélez (1905–1993), Puerto Rican writer and journalist
- Cynthia Soto, American politician
- Daniel Garcia Soto, Puerto Rican wrestler
- Darren Soto (born 1978), American politician
- Diana Soto (born 1980), Peruvian volleyball player
- Diana Patricia González Soto (born 1964), Mexican politician
- Eddie Soto (born 1972), American soccer player
- Elías M. Soto (1858–1944), Colombian musician and composer
- Elkin Soto (born 1980), Colombian footballer
- Erik Manuel Soto Mexican-American poet
- Felix Soto Toro (born 1967), Puerto Rican astronaut
- Fernando Soto-Hay y Garcia
- Francisco Puertas Soto (born 1963), Spanish rugby player
- Freddy Soto (1970–2005), American comedian
- Gabriel Soto (born 1975), Mexican model and actor
- Gary Soto (born 1952), American author and poet
- Geovany Soto (born 1983), Puerto Rican baseball player
- Héctor Soto (born 1978), Puerto Rican volleyball player
- Hernando de Soto (c. 1500–1542), Spanish explorer
- Humberto Soto (born 1980), Mexican boxer
- Iván Hernández Soto (born 1980), Spanish footballer
- Iván Sánchez-Rico Soto (born 1980), Spanish footballer
- Jafet Soto (born 1976), Costa Rican footballer
- Jaime Soto (born 1955), American Catholic bishop
- Jay Soto, American jazz guitarist
- Jeff Scott Soto (born 1965), American singer
- Jesús Rafael Soto (1923–2005), Venezuelan artist
- Jock Soto, American ballet dancer
- Joel Soto (born 1982), Chilean footballer
- Jorge Soto (footballer) (born 1971), Peruvian footballer
- Jorge Soto (golfer) (1945–2011), Argentine golfer
- Jorge Azanza Soto (born 1982), Spanish bicycle racer
- José Soto (disambiguation)
- Jose Luis de Quintanar Soto y Ruiz (1772–1837), Mexican military officer
- Josu De Solaun Soto (born 1982), Spanish pianist
- Juan Soto (born 1998), Dominican baseball player
- Juan Soto (referee) (born 1977), Venezuelan football referee
- Lindsay Soto (born 1976), American sports journalist
- Lisa Soto, American artist
- Lornna Soto (born 1970), Puerto Rican politician
- Luis Gutiérrez Soto (1890–1977), Spanish architect
- Manuel Ángel Núñez Soto (born 1951), Mexican politician
- Marco Aurelio Soto (1846–1908), President of Honduras
- Mario Soto (baseball) (born 1956), Dominican baseball player
- Mario Soto (footballer, born 1950), Chilean footballer
- Máximo Soto Hall (1871–1944), Guatemalan novelist
- Miriam Blasco Soto (born 1963), Spanish judoka
- Neftalí Soto (baseball) (born 1989), Puerto Rican baseball player
- Nell Soto (1926–2009), American politician
- Onell Soto (1932–2015), American Episcopal bishop
- Pablo Soto (software developer) (born 1979), Spanish computer scientist
- Pedro Blanco Soto (1789–1825), President of Bolivia
- Pedro Juan Soto (1928–2002), Puerto Rican writer
- Roberto Soto (born 1948), Puerto Rican wrestler
- Rodolfo Campo Soto (born 1942), Colombian politician
- Santiago Cervera Soto (born 1965), Spanish politician
- Steve Soto (born 1963), American musician
- Talisa Soto (born 1967), American model and actress
- Victoria Leigh Soto (1985–2012), American teacher and murder victim
- Juan Soto (born October 25, 1998) Professional MLB player
