= Juan Sánchez-Navarro y Peón =

Juan Sánchez-Navarro y Peón (April 24, 1913 – February 12, 2006) was a Mexican businessman, lawyer, philosopher, philanthropist, journalist and professor. For more than 40 years, he served as Executive Vice President of Grupo Modelo. In addition, he led various national business organizations and was a main co-founder of Mexico's National Action Party PAN. Though he himself not a PAN affiliate, he believed in the essential importance of democracy by means of a bi-partisan system that could serve as a contrast to then Mexico's ruling political party PRI (thus his involvement PAN in its inception). Sanchez-Navarro would years later be known as the moral conscience and the single most important ideological figure in Mexico's booming business community.

== Biography ==
Sánchez-Navarro was born in downtown Mexico City, descendant of the influential Sánchez Navarro family. He studied law and philosophy in the National Autonomous University of Mexico eventually becoming a professor there for more than 50 years. At some point he was also a teaching assistant to philosopher Antonio Caso.

In 1938, Sánchez-Navarro became a manager at Cervecería Central which then belonged to Cervecería Cuauhtémoc. In 1939 he co-founded the National Action Party (PAN) with Manuel Gómez Morín and Efraín González Luna. In 1942 he was offered a job at then small competitor Cervecería Modelo (now makers of Corona, Pacifico, Victoria amongst others) by the company's founder Pablo Diez, after what was a fair but staunch negotiation with Don Pablo over beer concession rights at a bullfighting arena. He accepted the new job and eventually would become director and vice president of the board of Grupo Modelo as well as a controlling shareholder, from 1960 forward. Following the death of Don Pablo, Sanchez-Navarro became the leading face of the company. Sánchez-Navarro would be active and preside in the many employers' organizations he helped establish in Mexico. These include CANACINTRA, CONCANACO, CONCAMIN, CCE, CEESP, CEMAI among others. He was a notable supporter of Vicente Fox' Presidential campaign in 2000.

He died in Mexico City at the age of 92, where he was buried in the French cemetery.

== Works ==
- Los orígenes de la idea de justicia. ("On the origins of the concept of Justice");
- El concepto cristiano de la propiedad. ("The Christian idea of property");
- La cuestión del salario justo. ("The question of the fair salary");
- Principios básicos para el sano desarrollo económico. ("Basic principles for a healthy economic development");
- El empresariado mexicano en el desarrollo económico. ("The Mexican business community and their role in economic development")
