= List of municipal presidents of Saltillo =

The following is a list of municipal presidents of Saltillo Municipality in the state of Coahuila, Mexico. The municipality includes the city of Saltillo.

== List of officials ==
- Mauricio D. González, 1937-1938
- Pedro Cerda, 1939-1940
- Salvador Salazar, 1940
- Jesús Daniel Aguilar, 1940-1940
- Tomás Algaba Gómez, 1941-1941
- Ricardo Villarreal, 1942-1942
- Ignacio Cepeda Dávila, 1943-1945
- Jesús R. Flores Luna, 1945
- Evelio González Treviño, 1946-1948
- Carlos de la Peña Santos, 1949-1951
- Carlos Valdés Villarreal, 1952-1954
- Manuel Valdés Dávila, 1955-1957
- Eulalio Gutiérrez Treviño, 1958-1960
- Eduardo Dávila Garza, 1961-1963
- Roberto Orozco Melo, 1964-1966
- Jesús R. González, 1967-1969
- Arturo Berrueto González, 1970-1972
- Luis Horacio Salinas, 1973-1975
- Juan Pablo Rodríguez Galindo, 1976-1978
- Enrique Martínez y Martínez, 1979-1981
- Mario Eulalio Gutiérrez Talamás, 1982-1984
- Carlos de la Peña Ramos, 1985-1987
- Eleazar Galindo Vara, 1988-1990
- Mario Eulalio Gutiérrez Talamás, 1990
- Rosendo Villarreal, 1991-1993
- Bibiano Berlanga Castro, 1993
- Miguel Arizpe Jiménez, 1994-1996
- Manuel López Villarreal, 1997-1999
- Óscar Pimentel González, 2000-2002
- Humberto Moreira, 2003-2005
- Ismael Eugenio Ramos Flores, 2005
- Fernando de las Fuentes, 2006-2008
- Jorge Torres López, 2008-2009
- Jericó Abramo Masso, 2010-2013
- Isidro López Villarreal, 2014-2017
- Manolo Jiménez Salinas, 2018-2021
- José María Fraustro Siller, 2022-present

== See also ==
- Coahuila state election, 2020
- History of Saltillo
