= Ernesto Saro Boardman =

Mexican politician

Senator of the Congress of the Union for Coahuila
- In office 1 September 2006 – 31 August 2012
- Preceded by: Luis Alberto Rico Samaniego
- Succeeded by: Silvia Garza Galván

Deputy of the Congress of the Union for the 4th district of Coahuila
- In office 1 September 2000 – 17 July 2002
- Preceded by: Horacio Veloz Muñoz
- Succeeded by: María Teresa Romo Castillón

Personal details
- Born: 25 July 1950 (age 75) Ramos Arizpe, Coahuila, Mexico
- Party: PAN
- Occupation: Senator

Ernesto Saro Boardman (born 25 July 1950) is a Mexican politician affiliated with the National Action Party (PAN). He served as a senator during the 60th and 61st sessions of Congress (2006–2012), representing Coahuila. He also served as a federal deputy during the 58th Congress (2000–2002), representing Coahuila's fourth district.
