= Miguel Arizpe Jiménez =

Mexican politician (born 1948)

- Born: 17 November 1948 (age 77); Monterrey, Nuevo León, Mexico
- Occupation: Politician
- Political party: PRI

Miguel Arizpe Jiménez (born 17 November 1948) is a Mexican politician from the Institutional Revolutionary Party (PRI). From 2000 to 2003 he served as a federal deputy in the 58th session of Congress, representing Coahuila's seventh district.

== See also ==
- 1993 Coahuila state election
- List of presidents of Saltillo Municipality

Preceded by Bibiano Berlanga Castro	Municipal President of Saltillo, Coahuila; 1993—1996	Succeeded by Manuel López Villarreal
Preceded by Pilar Concepción Cabrera Hernández	LVIII Legislature of the Chamber of Diputies; 2000—2003	Succeeded by
