= Enrique Martínez y Martínez =

Mexican politician

Enrique Martinez y Martinez
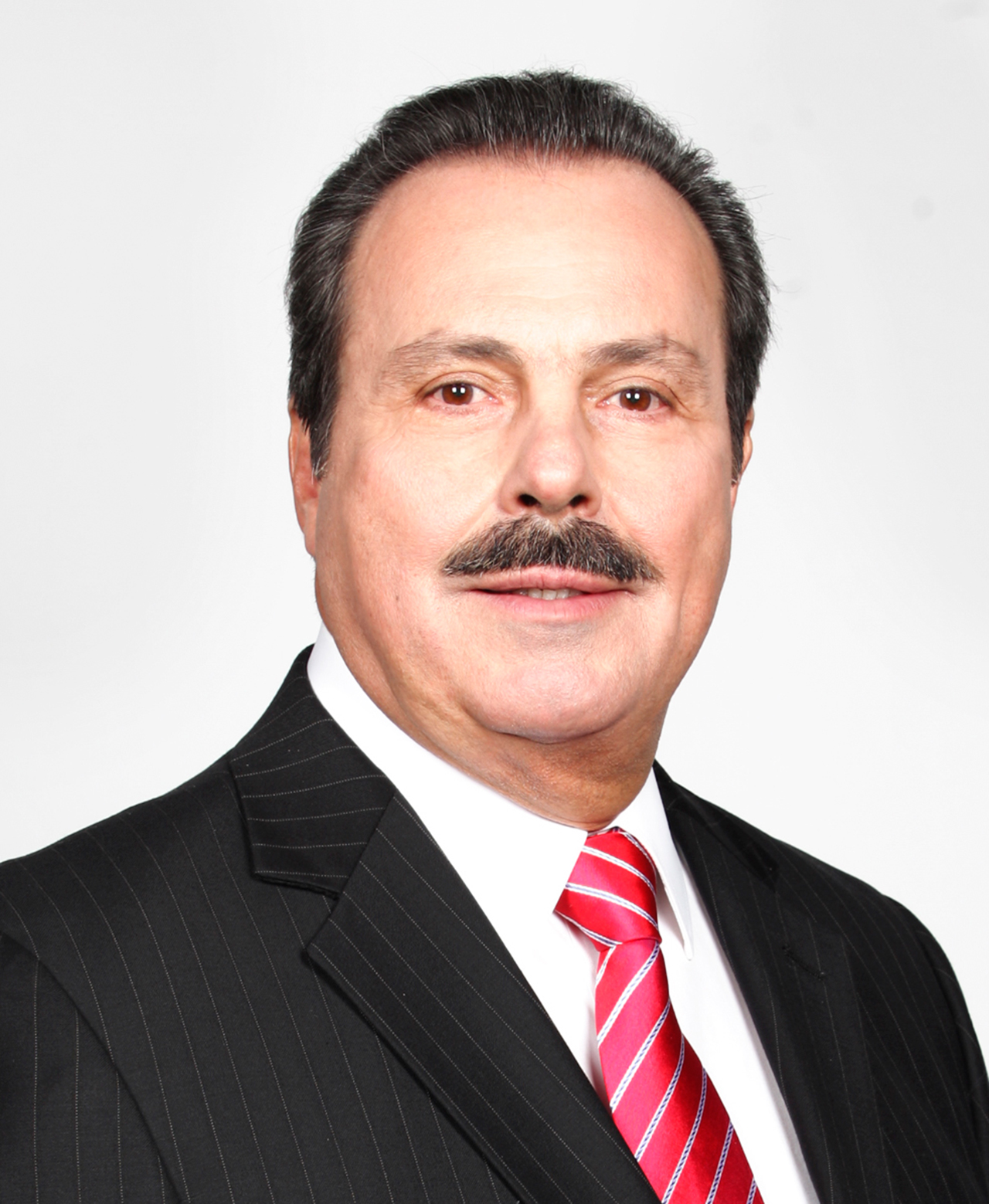

Ambassador of Mexico to Cuba
- In office 25 May 2015 – 30 November 2018
- President: Enrique Peña Nieto
- Preceded by: Juan José Bremer
- Succeeded by: Miguel Ignacio Díaz Reynoso

Secretary of Agriculture, Livestock, Rural Development, Fisheries and Food
- In office 1 December 2012 – 27 August 2015
- President: Enrique Peña Nieto
- Preceded by: Francisco Mayorga Castañeda
- Succeeded by: José Calzada

25th Governor of Coahuila
- In office 2 December 1999 – 17 February 2005
- Preceded by: Rogelio Montemayor Seguy
- Succeeded by: Humberto Moreira Valdés

Personal details
- Born: 10 November 1948 (age 77) Saltillo
- Party: Revolutionary Institutional Party
- Spouse: María Guadalupe Morales
- Education: Monterrey Institute of Technology and Higher Education

Enrique Martinez y Martinez (born 10 November 1948 in Saltillo) is a Mexican politician affiliated with the Revolutionary Institutional Party. He has served as Mexico's Ambassador to Cuba since 2016. He previously served as Governor of Coahuila from 2 December 1999 to 17 February 2005.

Martínez y Martínez received a bachelor's degree in economics from the Monterrey Institute of Technology and Higher Studies. After graduation, he taught several courses in economics at the Autonomous University of Coahuila and at the Antonio Narro Autonomous Agricultural University (in Spanish: Universidad Autonoma Agraria Antonio Narro).

He joined the private sector as president of Grupo Empresarial Martínez, started his political career as municipal president of Saltillo (1979–81) and has been elected twice to the Chamber of Deputies: 1988–91, representing Coahuila's First District, and 1997–99, representing its Seventh District.

In 1999, as the PRI candidate for governor, he defeated a coalition of four parties with 60% of the vote and started serving as governor of Coahuila on 1 December; his term expired on 1 December 2005, and he was succeeded by Humberto Moreira Valdés.

During the early months of 2005 Martínez tried unsuccessfully to secure his party nomination for the 2006 presidential election.

He is married to María Guadalupe Morales and has two sons and a daughter: Enrique, Eduardo and Ana Sofía.

== See also ==
- List of presidents of Saltillo Municipality

Political offices
Preceded by Rogelio Montemayor Seguy	Governor of Coahuila; 1999–2005	Succeeded by Humberto Moreira Valdés
Preceded by Juan Pablo Rodríguez Galindo	Municipal President of Saltillo, Coahuila; 1978–1981	Succeeded by Mario Eulalio Gutiérrez Talamás
Preceded by Francisco Mayorga Castañeda	Secretary of Agriculture; 2012–2015	Succeeded by José Calzada
