= 2026 Coahuila state election =

- June 7, 2026
- All 25 seats in the Congress of Coahuila; 13 seats needed for a majority
- Turnout: 50.74% ▼5.8%
Party	Vote %	Seats	+/–
PRI	51.34	15	+5
MORENA	22.87	5	0
Unidad Democrática de Coahuila	4.01	3	+2
Nuevas Ideas	6.13	1	0
PT	2.69	1	0
This lists parties that won seats. See the complete results below.
President of the Governing Board before
Luz Morales Núñez; PRI

The 2026 Coahuila state election took place on June 7, 2026, to elect all 25 seats in the Congress of Coahuila. Pre-campaign stages were held during March. Electoral campaigns ran from May 1 to May 31, while voting took place on June 7.

All 25 seats in the local Congress were up for election, 16 through direct election in single-member constituencies and 9 through a proportional representation system.

== Background ==
Coahuila is one of few states where the ruling National Regeneration Movement (Morena) party does not hold the majority in the local congress since they assumed control of the federal government in the 2024 general election.

== Districts ==
=== District 1. Acuña ===
District 1 (Acuña)
Party	Candidate	Votes	
National Action Party	Gabriela Arce	535	0.73%
Institutional Revolutionary Party	Francisco Navarro Galindo	25980	35.62%
Ecologist Green Party of Mexico	Pablo Ortega	2936	4.03%
Labor Party	Delia Gonzalez	837	1.15%
Democratic Unity of Coahuila	Francisco Navarro Galindo	19403	26.61%
Citizens' Movement	Marcela Castro	310	0.43%
National Regeneration Movement	Delia Gonzalez	8567	11.75%
New Ideas	Javier Gonzalez	5723	7.85%
Mexico Avante	Alberto Zatarain	193	0.26%
		2269	3.14%
		573	0.79%
Valid votes			
Blank vote/Spoilt vote/Protest vote/Write-in candidate			
Turnout			
Abstention			
Total votes			
PREP-Electoral Institute of Coahuila

=== District 2. Piedras Negras ===
District 2 (Piedras Negras)
Party	Candidate	Votes	
National Action Party	Sergio Borja	726	1.08%
Institutional Revolutionary Party	Guillermo Ruiz (incumbent)	32978	48.88%
Ecologist Green Party of Mexico	Karla Lucio	1568	2.43%
Labor Party	Mayra Ruby Rangel	1935	3.00%
Democratic Unity of Coahuila	Guillermo Ruiz (incumbent)	973	1.51%
Citizens' Movement	Gabriela Lopez	486	0.75%
National Regeneration Movement	Mayra Ruby Rangel	14997	23.28%
New Ideas	Vanessa Ramirez	4305	6.68%
Mexico Avante	Sergio Briones	60	0.09%
Non-Partisan	Masias Menera Sierra	1488	2.06%
Valid votes			
Blank vote/Spoilt vote/Protest vote/Write-in candidate			
Turnout			
Abstention			
Total votes			
PREP-Electoral Institute of Coahuila

=== District 3. Sabinas ===
District 3 (Sabinas)
Party	Candidate	Votes	
National Action Party	Cesar Macareno	1176	1.37%
Institutional Revolutionary Party	Claudia Garza	35737	41.74%
Ecologist Green Party of Mexico	Alhira Resendiz	7823	9.57%
Labor Party	Jesus Z'Cruz	6343	7.76%
Democratic Unity of Coahuila	Claudia Garza	4340	5.31%
Citizens' Movement	Omar Corral	1056	1.29%
National Regeneration Movement	Jesus Z'Cruz	15247	18.64%
New Ideas	Mario Lopez	5119	6.26%
Mexico Avante	Roberto Carlos Ramos	138	0.17%
Valid votes			
Blank vote/Spoilt vote/Protest vote/Write-in candidate			
Turnout			
Abstention			
Total votes			
PREP-Electoral Institute of Coahuila

=== District 4. San Pedro ===
District 4 (San Pedro)
Party	Candidate	Votes	
National Action Party	Beatriz Sanchez	2147	2.63%
Institutional Revolutionary Party	Cristina Amezcua	35781	43.76%
Ecologist Green Party of Mexico	Rosa Hernandez	2854	3.51%
Labor Party	Delia Hernandez* (incumbent)	1321	1.62%
Democratic Unity of Coahuila	Cristina Amezcua	3141	3.86%
Citizens' Movement	Maria Aracely Rosales	790	0.97%
National Regeneration Movement	Delia Hernandez* (incumbent)	24321	29.90%
New Ideas	Denisse Espino	5105	6.28%
Mexico Avante	Esmeralda Rivera	834	1.03%
Non-Partisan	Mario Alberto Cordova	944	1.31%
Valid votes			
Blank vote/Spoilt vote/Protest vote/Write-in candidate			
Turnout			
Abstention			
Total votes			
PREP-Electoral Institute of Coahuila

=== District 5. Monclova ===
District 5 (Monclova)
Party	Candidate	Votes	
National Action Party	Hector Garza	233	2.85%
Institutional Revolutionary Party	Esra Ibn Cavazos	36588	46.71%
Ecologist Green Party of Mexico	Wendy Anai Delgado	931	1.22%
Labor Party	Alfonso Almeraz	1078	1.42%
Democratic Unity of Coahuila	Esra Ibn Cavazos	644	0.85%
Citizens' Movement	Jaime Diaz	1356	1.78%
National Regeneration Movement	Alfonso Almeraz	19235	25.29%
New Ideas	Humberto Sabas Valdes	7314	9.61%
Mexico Avante	Fernando Rodriguez	2518	3.31%
Valid votes			
Blank vote/Spoilt vote/Protest vote/Write-in candidate			
Turnout			
Abstention			
Total votes			
PREP-Electoral Institute of Coahuila

=== District 6. Frontera ===
District 6 (Frontera)
Party	Candidate	Votes	
National Action Party	Yolanda Acuña	616	0.76%
Institutional Revolutionary Party	Hector Garcia Falcon	37182	45.99%
Ecologist Green Party of Mexico	Enrique Sanchez	1794	2.16%
Labor Party	Antonio Flores* (incumbent)	9224	11.13%
Democratic Unity of Coahuila	Hector Garcia Falcon	780	0.94%
Citizens' Movement	Antonio Wislar	385	0.46%
National Regeneration Movement	Antonio Flores* (incumbent)	15306	18.47%
New Ideas	Elier Ramirez	3428	4.14%
Mexico Avante	Cesar Santillana	906	1.09%
Valid votes			
Blank vote/Spoilt vote/Protest vote/Write-in candidate			
Turnout			
Abstention			
Total votes			
PREP-Electoral Institute of Coahuila

=== District 7. Matamoros ===
District 7 (Matamoros)
Party	Candidate	Votes	
National Action Party	Ezequiel Soto	501	0.50%
Institutional Revolutionary Party	Sol Luna Adame	50756	50.84%
Ecologist Green Party of Mexico	Israel Castañeda	2379	2.57%
Labor Party	Darinka Guerra	1222	1.32%
Democratic Unity of Coahuila	Sol Luna Adame	1620	1.75%
Citizens' Movement	Horacio Piña	535	0.58%
National Regeneration Movement	Darinka Guerra	24537	26.51%
New Ideas	Jesus Contreras Pacheco	8343	9.01%
Mexico Avante	Marleny Barrientos	142	0.15%
Valid votes			
Blank vote/Spoilt vote/Protest vote/Write-in candidate			
Turnout			
Abstention			
Total votes			
PREP-Electoral Institute of Coahuila

=== District 8. Torreón ===
District 8 (Torreón)
Party	Candidate	Votes	
National Action Party	Gerardo Aguado Gomez	2265	3.65%
Institutional Revolutionary Party	Ximena Villarreal Blake	37591	60.88%
Ecologist Green Party of Mexico	Vanessa Herrera	1000	1.57%
Labor Party	Lucia Zorrilla	1282	2.01%
Democratic Unity of Coahuila	Ximena Villarreal Blake	1441	2.26%
Citizens' Movement	Oscar Puentes	1380	2.16%
National Regeneration Movement	Lucia Zorrilla	10644	16.68%
New Ideas	Pablo Uribe	4083	6.40%
Mexico Avante	Ana Isabel Martinez	86	0.13%
Valid votes			
Blank vote/Spoilt vote/Protest vote/Write-in candidate			
Turnout			
Abstention			
Total votes			
PREP-Electoral Institute of Coahuila

=== District 9. Torreón ===
District 9 (Torreón)
Party	Candidate	Votes	
National Action Party	Thalia Peñaloza	2618	2.95%
Institutional Revolutionary Party	Veronica Martinez (incumbent)	55266	62.24%
Ecologist Green Party of Mexico	Gabriel Hernandez	1399	1.60%
Labor Party	Antonio Attolini * (incumbent)	1446	1.66%
Democratic Unity of Coahuila	Veronica Martinez (incumbent)	857	0.98%
Citizens' Movement	Valeria Carranza	1309	1.50%
National Regeneration Movement	Antonio Attolini *(incumbent)	17212	19.74%
New Ideas	Vanessa Martinez	3441	3.95%
Mexico Avante	Karla Quiñonez	105	0.12%
Valid votes			
Blank vote/Spoilt vote/Protest vote/Write-in candidate			
Turnout			
Abstention			
Total votes			
PREP-Electoral Institute of Coahuila

=== District 10. Torreón ===
District 10 (Torreón)
Party	Candidate	Votes	
National Action Party	Abraham Rebollar	1514	2.12%
Institutional Revolutionary Party	Felipe Gonzalez	42038	58.96%
Ecologist Green Party of Mexico	Maria Villegas	1321	1.89%
Labor Party	Rocio de Aguinaga	647	0.92%
Democratic Unity of Coahuila	Felipe Gonzalez	516	0.74%
Citizens' Movement	Sofia Diaz Lozano	820	1.17%
National Regeneration Movement	Rocio de Aguinaga	16149	23.09%
New Ideas	Carlos Alba	3420	4.89%
Mexico Avante	Lucia Lozano	135	0.19%
Valid votes			
Blank vote/Spoilt vote/Protest vote/Write-in candidate			
Turnout			
Abstention			
Total votes			
PREP-Electoral Institute of Coahuila

=== District 11. Torreón ===
District 11 (Torreón)
Party	Candidate	Votes	
National Action Party	Claudia Alvarez	1127	1.96%
Institutional Revolutionary Party	Hugo Davila Prado (incumbent)	33902	59.01%
Ecologist Green Party of Mexico	Gerardo Calvillo	1265	2.26%
Labor Party	Fernando Hernandez	580	1.04%
Democratic Unity of Coahuila	Hugo Davila Prado (incumbent)	509	0.91%
Citizens' Movement	Jaime Martinez Veloz	803	1.43%
National Regeneration Movement	Fernando Hernandez	11687	20.86%
New Ideas	Luisa Morales	2910	5.19%
Mexico Avante	Juan Pablo Castellanos	109	0.19%
Valid votes			
Blank vote/Spoilt vote/Protest vote/Write-in candidate			
Turnout			
Abstention			
Total votes			
PREP-Electoral Institute of Coahuila

=== District 12. Ramos Arizpe ===
District 12 (Ramos Arizpe)
Party	Candidate	Votes	
National Action Party	Kimberli Regalado	2217	2.95%
Institutional Revolutionary Party	Jose Maria Morales	36733	48.83%
Ecologist Green Party of Mexico	Areli Flores	2099	2.99%
Labor Party	Esthela Flores	997	1.42%
Democratic Unity of Coahuila	Jose Maria Morales	1380	1.96%
Citizens' Movement	Laura Cruz	993	1.41%
National Regeneration Movement	Esthela Flores	14058	20.01%
New Ideas	Erika Martinez	7102	10.11%
Mexico Avante	Omar Nacoud Rodriguez	256	0.36%
Valid votes			
Blank vote/Spoilt vote/Protest vote/Write-in candidate			
Turnout			
Abstention			
Total votes			
PREP-Electoral Institute of Coahuila

=== District 13. Saltillo ===
District 13 (Saltillo)
Party	Candidate	Votes	
National Action Party	Ana Laura Rivera	2911	3.09%
Institutional Revolutionary Party	Luz Elena Morales (incumbent)	49241	52.34%
Ecologist Green Party of Mexico	Yulia Vitela	1177	1.30%
Labor Party	Josefina Flores	950	1.05%
Democratic Unity of Coahuila	Luz Elena Morales (incumbent)	755	0.83%
Citizens' Movement	Monica Trejo	3839	4.23%
National Regeneration Movement	Josefina Flores	23774	26.18%
New Ideas	Karla Gonzalez	4443	4.89%
Mexico Avante	Carlos de la Fuente	1101	1.21%
Valid votes			
Blank vote/Spoilt vote/Protest vote/Write-in candidate			
Turnout			
Abstention			
Total votes			
PREP-Electoral Institute of Coahuila

=== District 14. Saltillo ===
District 14 (Saltillo)
Party	Candidate	Votes	
National Action Party	Argentina Cardenas	1776	2.41%
Institutional Revolutionary Party	Marimar Arroyo	37253	50.59%
Ecologist Green Party of Mexico	Zulaica Martinez	1480	2.13%
Labor Party	Eduardo Hernandez	606	0.87%
Democratic Unity of Coahuila	Marimar Arroyo	742	1.07%
Citizens' Movement	Alfonso Danao	5104	7.34%
National Regeneration Movement	Eduardo Hernandez	16249	23.35%
New Ideas	Marcela Valdes	4020	5.78%
Mexico Avante	Dulce Yeverino	322	0.46%
Valid votes			
Blank vote/Spoilt vote/Protest vote/Write-in candidate			
Turnout			
Abstention			
Total votes			
PREP-Electoral Institute of Coahuila

=== District 15. Saltillo ===
District 15 (Saltillo)
Party	Candidate	Votes	
National Action Party	Diego Cortes	1732	2.39%
Institutional Revolutionary Party	Eduardo Medrano	34522	47.69%
Ecologist Green Party of Mexico	Limbar Valdez	1318	1.86%
Labor Party	Alberto Hurtado * (incumbent)	1225	1.73%
Democratic Unity of Coahuila	Eduardo Medrano	580	0.82%
Citizens' Movement	Mitchell Marquez	3410	4.80%
National Regeneration Movement	Alberto Hurtado * (incumbent)	19068	26.85%
New Ideas	Martin Guevara	4156	5.85%
Mexico Avante	Perla Guerrero	356	0.50%
Valid votes			
Blank vote/Spoilt vote/Protest vote/Write-in candidate			
Turnout			
Abstention			
Total votes			
PREP-Electoral Institute of Coahuila

=== District 16. Saltillo ===
District 16 (Saltillo)
Party	Candidate	Votes	
National Action Party	Juana Parra	1456	1.69%
Institutional Revolutionary Party	Alvaro Moreira (incumbent)	39379	45.58%
Ecologist Green Party of Mexico	Alejandro Martinez	2169	2.60%
Labor Party	Alejandra Salazar Mejorado	2405	2.88%
Democratic Unity of Coahuila	Alvaro Moreira (incumbent)	793	0.95%
Citizens' Movement	Albany Castro	2965	3.55%
National Regeneration Movement	Alejandra Salazar Mejorado	24332	29.17%
New Ideas	Adriana Peña	4215	5.05%
Mexico Avante	Alejandra Iznaola	324	0.39%
Valid votes			
Blank vote/Spoilt vote/Protest vote/Write-in candidate			
Turnout			
Abstention			
Total votes			
PREP-Electoral Institute of Coahuila

(*). – Incumbent candidate through proportional representation seat (2023–26).

== Results ==
Party
Institutional Revolutionary Party
Morena
National Action Party
Party of the Democratic Revolution
Labor Party
Ecologist Green Party of Mexico
Unidad Democrática de Coahuila
Total
Source: IEC

== See also ==
- Congress of Coahuila
