= Óscar Mohamar Dainitín =

Mexican politician

Oscar Mohamar Dainitín
- Born: 18 September 1969 (age 56); Coahuila, Mexico
- Occupation: Politician
- Political party: PAN

Oscar Miguel Mohamar Dainitín (born 18 September 1969) is a Mexican politician affiliated with the National Action Party (PAN). In the 2006 general election he was elected to the Chamber of Deputies for the 60th session of Congress, representing Coahuila's seventh district.
