= Óscar Pimentel González =

Mexican politician

- Born: 21 May 1955 (age 71); San Pedro, Coahuila, Mexico
- Occupation: Politician
- Political party: PRI

Óscar Pimentel González (born 21 May 1955) is a Mexican politician affiliated with the Institutional Revolutionary Party (PRI). He has been elected to the Chamber of Deputies on two occasions: in 1991, representing Coahuila's first district, and in 2003, representing Coahuila's fourth district.

== See also ==
- List of presidents of Saltillo Municipality

Preceded by Manuel López Villarreal	Municipal President of Saltillo, Coahuila; 1999–2002	Succeeded by Humberto Moreira Valdés
