= General Cepeda Municipality =

Municipality in the Mexican state of Coahuila

General Cepeda
- Municipality
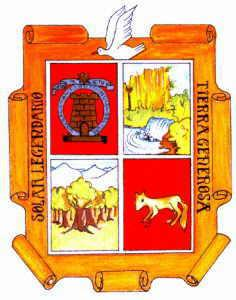
- Coat of arms

- Municipality of General Cepeda in Coahuila

- Location in Mexico
- Coordinates: 25°22′41″N 101°28′30″W
- Country: Mexico
- State: Coahuila
- Municipal seat: General Cepeda

Area
  - Total: 3,517 km^{2} (1,358 sq mi)

Population (2005)
  - Total: 11,284

General Cepeda is one of the 38 municipalities of Coahuila, in north-eastern Mexico. The municipal seat lies at General Cepeda. The municipality covers an area of 3517 km².

As of 2005, the municipality had a total population of 11,284.
