= Sánchez Navarro ranch =

Former private estate in Mexico

Coordinates: 25°22′36″N 101°28′36″W

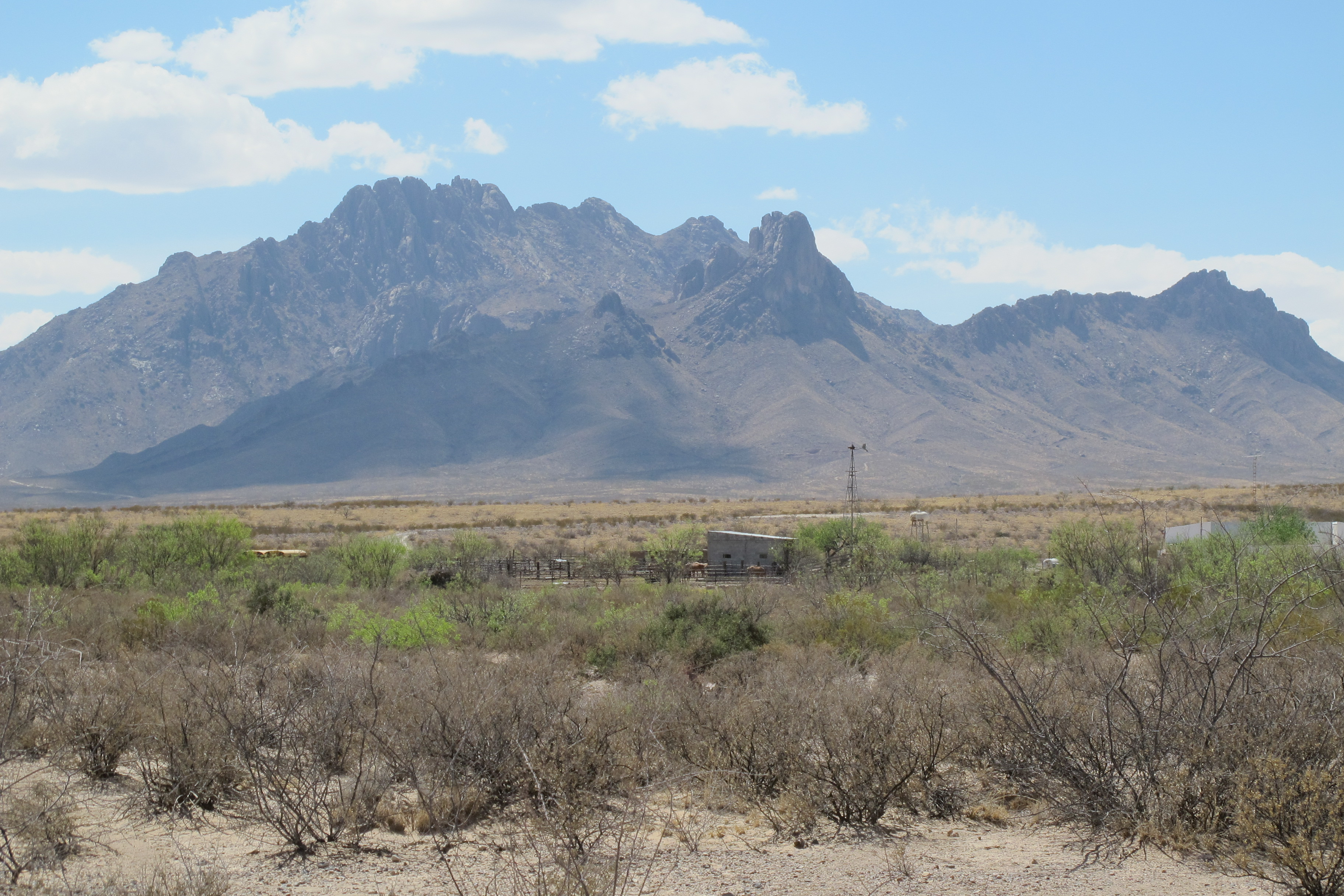
A typical scene in the Chihuahua desert.

The Sánchez Navarro ranch (1765–1866) in Mexico was the largest privately owned estate or latifundio in Latin America. At its maximum extent, the Sánchez Navarro family owned more than 67,000 square kilometres (16,500,000 acres) of land, an area almost as large as the Republic of Ireland and larger than the American state of West Virginia. The Sánchez Navarro latifundio was more than five times the size of the largest ranch, the XIT, in the United States and extended 350 kilometres (220 miles) from north to south. The latifundio was located in the Chihuahuan Desert, mostly in Coahuila, but also in Nuevo Leon, Durango, and Zacatecas.

The acquisition of land by José Miguel Sánchez Navarro (1730–1821) began in 1765 and the latifundio existed until 1866 when the land was expropriated by the government of Mexico. Family members continued to be prominent in Mexican society into the 21st century. Throughout their history the Sánchez Navarros struggled against raids by the Comanche and Apache Indians and frequent and persistent drought and scarcity of water for their livestock, mostly sheep but also cattle, horses, and mules.

== History ==
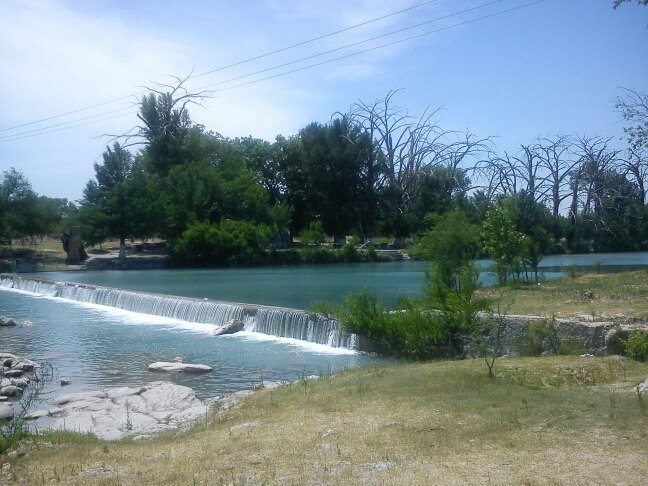
Water was scarce in most of the latifundo, except for the Sabinas River.

In the 16th century, most of the Spanish settlements in northern Mexico were established to exploit mineral wealth, especially silver. However, Coahuila (then called Nueva Extremadura) lacked large deposits of precious metals and livestock grazing, mostly sheep and cattle, became the principal economic activity. The sparse vegetation of the desert dictated the need for large tracts of land. Farming was only possible in river valleys, few in number, or where ephemeral lakes formed in the rainy season. Throughout the history of latifundios in Coahuila the scarcity of water due to frequent droughts was one of two major problems, the other being hostile Indians: first, in the 17th century, the Toboso peoples and other hunter-gatherer peoples native to Coahuila, in the 18th century the Apache, and, finally, in the 19th century, the Comanche.

The San Miguel del Aguajo latifundio. In the late 16th century, several early Spanish settlers in Coahuila received large grants of land from the Spanish government in Mexico City. Francisco de Urdiñola built a large latifundio centered on the community at San Francisco de Patos (renamed General Cepeda in 1892). in southern Coahuila. His descendants, including by marriage the Marquis de San Miguel de Aguayo, by the mid 18th century had accumulated nearly as much land as the later Sánchez Navarros and their holdings had roughly the same boundaries. The Marquisate of Aguayo introduced large scale growing of grapes at Parras and exported wine and brandy to Mexico City and other Mexican cities. The owners of San Miguel de Aguayo, as the latifundio was called, raised cattle, horses, and, especially, sheep with herds estimated to exceed 200,000. They also opened the first textile mill in northern Mexico to supply clothing to its workers and residents and created a cavalry force to defend against Indian raids. The headquarters at Patos had a population of 1,200 people in 1765.

Mismanagement and the hazards of raising livestock in a drought-prone region drove the Aguayo family to sell much of their property to English investors in 1825. The Sánchez Navarro family acquired the entire Aguayo estate in 1840.

The Sánchez Navarros. Concurrent with the growth of the San Miguel del Aguayo latifundio in southern Coahuila, the Sánchez Navarros became important in northern Coahuila. Originally a prominent family in Saltillo. José Miguel, a priest, was appointed as Curate in Monclova, the capital of Coahuila, in 1755. He was joined there by his brother José Gregorio (d. 1774). The Sánchez Navarro brothers began to acquire land around Monclova in 1765. They established their headquarters, the Hacienda de San Ignacio del Paso Tapado, 30 kilometres (19 mi) northeast of Monclova. Another brother, Manuel Francisco (1743-1805), soon joined the enterprise and acquired additional lands through marriage and inheritance. Manuel Francisco was the manager of the ranch, focusing mostly on the development of the northern portion of the estate near Santa Rosa (now Santa Rosa de Múzquiz) which is watered by the Sabinas River.

Manuel Francisco's son, José Melchor (1782-1836), took over management of the estate in 1802, then in poor condition due to drought and Apache raids. He established a new hacienda named Nuesta Señora de las Tres Hermanas. Tres Hermanas was large and designed for defense, a large compound surrounded by a wall 3 metres (10 ft) high, with dwellings and wall built of stone. The hacienda was 50 kilometres (31 miles) north of Monclova near the junction of the Monclova and Nadadores rivers. At Tres Hermanas and nearby Tapado Jose Melchor introduced irrigation on a large scale to the latifundio and enlarged a vineyard.

José Melchor died in 1836 and bequeathed the latifundio to his wife, Apolonia Beráin (d. 1876) and the couple's two sons, Jacobo (c.1814-after 1870) and Carlos (1816-1876). Apolonia ran the estate with "unquestionable authority" until her sons reached 25 years of age. In 1840, Carlos, an attorney who lived in Mexico City while Jacobo managed the estate, made the largest acquisition of the family when he purchased the bankrupt estate of San Miguel de Aguayo. This purchase increased the land holdings of the Sánchez Navarros to 67,000 square kilometres (16,500,000 acres). Their latifundio, thus, became the largest in Latin America. Jacobo moved the headquarters of the latifundio southward to Patos, taking over the headquarters of San Miguel de Aguayo. Scattered around the latifundio were 24 large haciendas or cascos each of which operated autonomously. Most of the cascos were in the better-watered northern part of the latifundio.

The livestock holdings of the Sánchez Navarros were immense. In 1847, their herds of sheep totaled 250,000 and in addition they possessed large numbers of cattle, horses, and mules. Their number of full-time employees was probably between 1,000 and 1,500. To this total could be added many seasonal employees, plus people who leased land from the Sánchez Navarros.

== Mexican War of Independence ==
In the Mexican War of Independence from Spain, led initially by Miguel Hidalgo and Ignacio Allende, the Sánchez Navarro family, led by José Melchor, took the side of royalist Spain. In 1811, defeated in battle, Hidalgo and Allende and their rebel army retreated to Saltillo, near Sánchez Navarro land. Spies told José Melchor that the rebels planned to continue their retreat to Texas passing through Monclova, home of many of the Sánchez Navarros. The royalists quickly took control of Monclova and set up an ambush at the Wells of Baján, on what was or would become Sánchez Navarro property. On March 21, 1811, the rebels were defeated. Hidalgo and Allende were captured and later executed. Among the prisoners taken by the royalists at the Wells of Baján were two nephews of José Miguel Sánchez Navarro who were fighting on the rebel side.

José Melchor continued to be involved in royalist politics, opposing independence for Mexico until 1821 when he supported the Plan of Iguala which called for Mexican independence but "without the social and economic reforms for which Father Hidalgo and his followers had fought."

== Threats from Indians ==
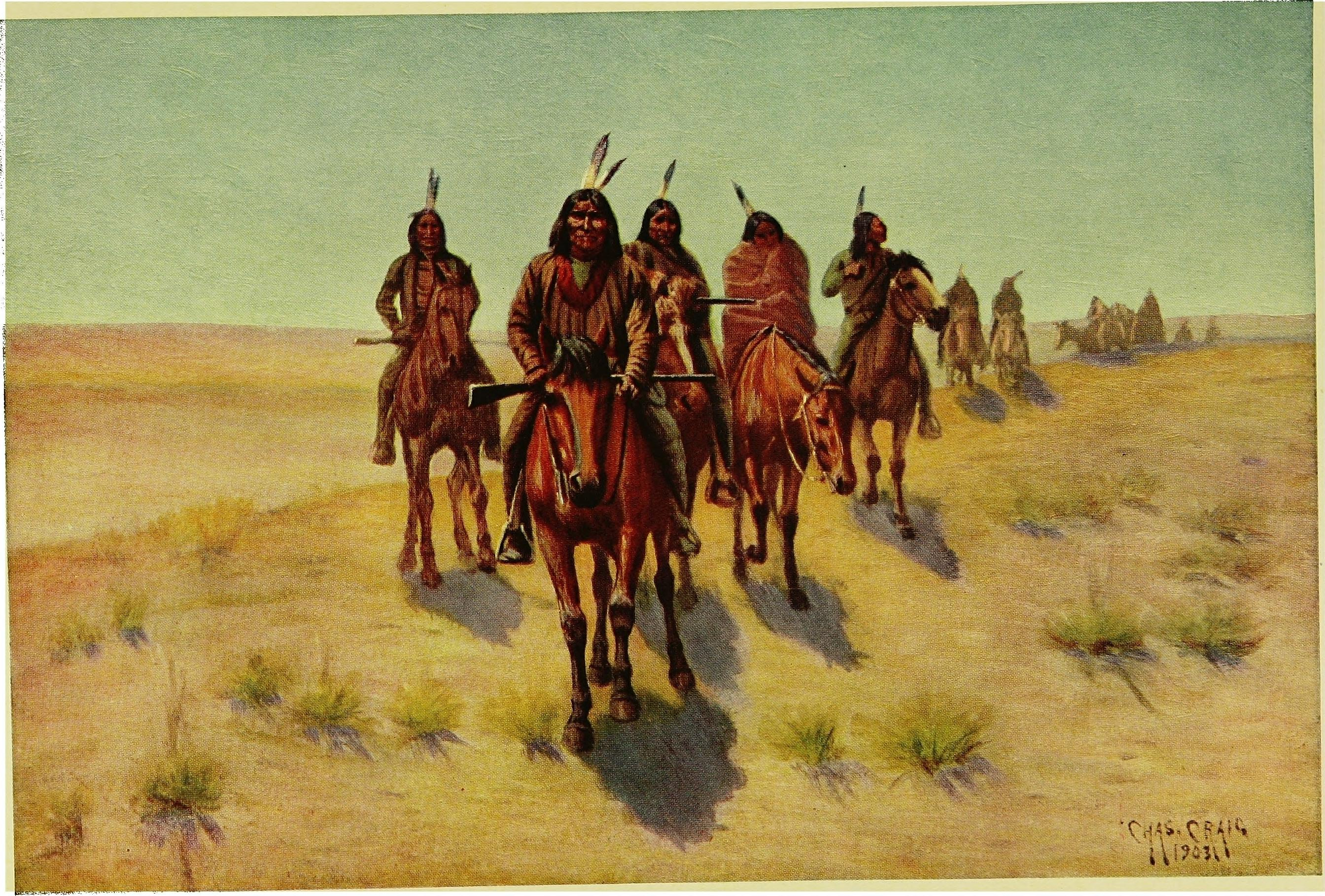
An artist's conception of Apache raiders.

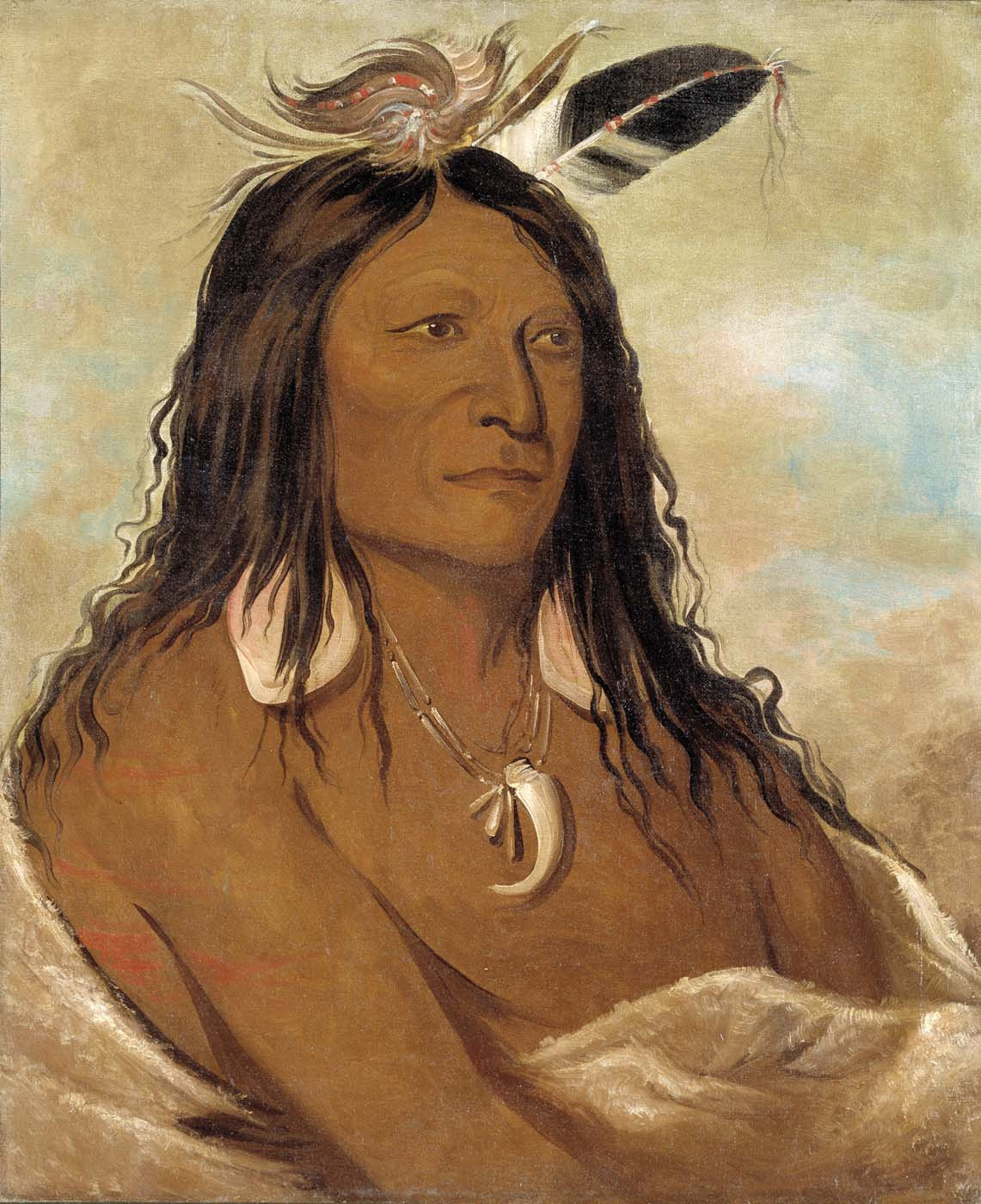
A Comanche chieftain in 1834.

Throughout its history the Sánchez Navarro latifundio suffered less from Indian attacks than other parts of northern Mexico because the family concentrated on raising sheep, rather than horses, mules, and cattle which were more valued by the Apache and Comanche who inhabited the region. Nevertheless, Indian raids were a constant problem, forcing the abandonment of several neighboring haciendas and latifundios. Apache raids were especially serious from the 1770s until the 1790s, the main perpetrators being the Lipan who lived to the northeast and the Mescalero who lived to the northwest. In spring 1790, the Apache depredations on the Sanchez Navarros were most severe. In March, the Apache killed 14 workers at Tapado and plundered an oxcart caravan; in April they slaughtered 500 sheep; and in May they killed 2 herders and kidnapped a youth. However, in 1786 the Comanches in Texas and New Mexico, induced by generous presents, had concluded a peace agreement with the Spanish and helped suppress the Apaches, thereby leading to an era of relative peace from 1793 until the Mexican war of independence undermined Spanish rule in the 1810s.

José Melchor Sánchez Navarro first noticed the presence of Comanches and their Kiowa allies in the northern part of the estate near Santa Rosa (Muzquiz) in 1825. The Comanches were much more numerous than the Apaches and their raids into Mexico often consisted of hundreds of men. The Sánchez Navarros declined to contribute to self defense units being organized at Monclova, saying their employees were needed to protect the latifundio. The first Comanche raid reaching deep into Mexico and menacing the entire area of the Sánchez Navarro latifundo was in the winter of 1840–1841. Defenses against the Comanches were organized at the Sánchez Navarro headquarters at Patos, but 400 Comanches instead attacked the outskirts of the city of Saltillo (population 12,000). In 1842, Patos was again threatened, saved perhaps by the arrival of 70 soldiers commanded by José Juan Sánchez Navarro, the soldier in the family, who responded with alacrity to the threat on his family's property. Thereafter, until the 1860s large and destructive Comanche raids on Sánchez Navarro haciendas and livestock were an almost yearly occurrence.

One reason that the Comanches were able to raid with near impunity in northern Mexico was the reluctance of the Sánchez Navarros and other large landowners to arm their employees, fearing revolt if shepherds and others got their hands on firearms. Likewise, they attempted to prevent their employees from fleeing south to safer places.

In 1850, the Mexican government persuaded a band of Kickapoo and Seminole Indians to move to Mexico to help fight against the Comanches. In exchange for their services, the Kickapoo were given 7,023 hectares (17,353 acres) of land in the northern part of the Sanchez Navarro estate. The Kickapoo continued to own and occupy the land into the 21st century.

The scope of the Sánchez Navarro's losses to Comanches is illustrated by a claim for compensation they submitted to the United States' government which in 1848 had assumed responsibility for preventing Indian raids originating in U.S. territory, a responsibility the U.S. abrogated in 1853 in the Treaty of Guadalupe. The claim (no doubt exaggerated for claims of livestock lost) said that between 1848 and 1853 the family had 141 employees killed by Indians and lost more than 200,000 sheep, 100,000 cattle, and 15,000 horses and mules. The family was never compensated.

== Mexican American War ==
In late 1846, U.S. General John Wool and his army occupied Monclova and Saltillo. Jacobo Sánchez Navarro, then managing the latifundio, established a friendly relationship with Wool and made a profit by supplying the American army. At the same time, Jacobo was working on behalf of Mexico, stockpiling flour for the army of Mexican leader Antonio López de Santa Anna which was advancing on Saltillo. Other members of the Sánchez Navarro family were in Santa Anna's army or in guerilla forces. However, the Americans defeated Santa Anna at the Battle of Buena Vista which took place on Sanchez Navarro property south of Saltillo in February 1847. Jacobo persuaded Wool that he was innocent of any deception against the Americans and declared his neutrality in the war. The Sánchez Navarro latifundio emerged unscathed by the war and the American occupation.

== Decline and fall ==
The Sánchez Navarro's prominence in Coahuila was reduced after 1855 by the rise of a political enemy, Santiago Vidaurri, whose partisans plundered the latifundio and Jacobo Sánchez Navarro's mansion in Saltillo. The family supported the French invasion of Mexico in 1862 and the subsequent imposition by France of the Austrian prince Maximilian as emperor of Mexico. Jacobo's brother Carlos became prominent at the court of Maximilian in Mexico City, while Jacobo managed the latifundio. In 1867 insurgent forces led by Benito Juárez overthrew and executed Maximilian and Carlos was imprisoned for a year. Carlos then went into exile in Paris, returning to Mexico in 1870 after Juárez granted him amnesty. He died in "genteel poverty" in Mexico City in 1876.

In 1866, Juárez ordered the expropriation of the Sánchez Navarro latifundio and other large estates in Mexico. After litigation the family regained some of its property in the 1870s, but promptly sold it. Members of the family continued to be prominent. Juan Sánchez-Navarro y Peón (1913-2006) was a prominent businessman, a founder of the National Action Party (PAN), and the author of a book about his ancestor's role in designing the Alamo in San Antonio, Texas. Several Sanchez Navarros are actors in Mexican movies and television.

== See also ==
- Juan Sánchez-Navarro y Peón
