= Manuel López Villarreal =

Mexican engineer and politician

- Born: 20 October 1958 (age 67); Saltillo, Coahuila, Mexico
- Education: ITESM; St. Edward's University
- Occupations: Engineer and politician
- Political party: PAN
- Spouse: María Teresa De Jesús Romo Castillón
- Children: 4

Jesús Manuel Ignacio López Villarreal (born 20 October 1958) is a Mexican engineer and politician who is affiliated with the National Action Party. He served as Deputy of the LIX Legislature of the Mexican Congress as a plurinominal representative. He was also the municipal president of Saltillo from 1997 to 1999.

== See also ==
- List of presidents of Saltillo Municipality

Preceded by Miguel Arizpe Jiménez	Municipal President of Saltillo, Coahuila; 1996–1999	Succeeded by Óscar Pimentel González
