= Coordinación de Mujeres del Paraguay =

The Coordinación de Mujeres del Paraguay (Coordinating Body of Paraguayan Women, CMP) is a network of feminist organisations in Paraguay. The CMP was founded in 1987 or 1988.

== History ==
At its inception the CMP consisted of fifteen Paraguayan women's groups. The initiative to form the CMP, led by Mercedes Sandoval de Hempel, has been characterised as a significant turning point in the articulation of women's rights after three decades of violent dictatorship under Alfredo Stroessner.

After the dictatorship, the CMP showed a new professionalism in making the case for gender equality. On behalf of the CMP, Sandoval drafted Law 1/92, the law relating to marriage, of the Paraguayan Civil Code. In the 1998 Paraguayan general election the CMP presented a 13-point platform of feminist policy proposals. In 1999 the CMP lobbied for a law explicitly outlawing domestic violence against women, resulting in legislation in 2000.

Groups under the umbrella of the CMP today are Aireana - Group for Lesbian Rights, the Trinidad Association, the Community Support Educational Base (BECA), the Documentation and Studies Center (CDE), Kuña Róga, and United in Hope (UNES). The group also includes individual members. Members have included Line Bareiro, Gloria Rubin. and Mirta Moragas.
