= Jiménez, Coahuila =

Town in the Mexican state of Coahuila

Jiménez
- Municipal seat
- Location in Mexico
- Coordinates: 29°04′11″N 100°40′30″W
- Country: Mexico
- State: Coahuila
- Municipality: Jiménez
- Elevation: 250 m (820 ft)

Population (2010)
  - Total: 1,160

Jiménez is a town and seat of the municipality of Jiménez in the Mexican state of Coahuila, at an altitude of 250 meters above sea level. It is located on the confluence of the Río San Diego and the Rio Grande (locally known as the Río Bravo) bordering with the U.S. state of Texas. It had a population of 1,160 inhabitants in the 2010 census, and is, unusually for a Mexican municipal seat, the second-largest locality in the municipality, after the town of San Carlos (which had a population of 3,126).

The town was founded in 1859 under the name of "Resurrección" by captain Manuel Leal, and tejano expatriate families from San Antonio, Texas.

== History ==
In June 1675 the area was first visited by Lt. Fernando del Bosque, on a reconnaissance expedition up the Rio Grande from the city of Nuestra Sra. de Guadalupe (Monclova). He was accompanied by the Franciscan Friars Juan Larios and Dionisio de San Buenaventura. The troop camped on the edge of the San Diego river, which the Indians called the "Nueces", very near the site of the actual town of Jiménez today. They met with two local Native American chiefs, Bacora and Pinanaca whose tribe, numbering 150 people, were on a buffalo hunting expedition. Del Bosque named the camp "Santa Clara de las Nueces".

The area was again visited in 1729 by captain, José de Barroterán, who suggested a site on the San Diego river for a possible Presidio, but no attempt was made at foundation.

In December 1735, Governor Blas de la Garza Falcón and Joseph de Eca y Múzquiz selected an area on the banks of the San Diego river for a fort, and actually began cutting logs for its construction, but had to stop operations when they were ordered back to San Juan Bautista. In 1737, permission was given to captain Miguel de la Garza Falcón, son of the governor who had died the previous year, to begin the construction of the presidio on the San Diego, arriving in October of that year with 50 soldiers and officers as well as 16 families for the new presidio which was named "Sacramento". The place turned out to be a poor choice as the land was difficult to irrigate, and after a brief two years it was moved to Santa Rosa, now Melchor Múzquiz, Coahuila.

In 1773, a second attempt at another location on the San Diego river was attempted, this time the location was a small spring, tributary to the San Diego named "Aguaverde". The Presidio was completed and occupied by troops by late April 1773. This presidio and garrison lasted at this site for eight years, during which time it saw plenty of action against Native American attacks. In 1781 the garrison was relocated to San Fernando de Austria (now Zaragoza, Coah.), where the company still kept the name of Aguaverde, but the presidio was abandoned. It was not occupied again until the late 1840s and early 1850s, where the garrison of San Vicente was transplanted into the old Presidio.

In December 1859, a group headed by captain Manuel Leal founded villa La Resurreccion, with families from the surrounding towns of Piedras Negras, Guerrero, Nava, Gigedo, as well as a group of families from San Antonio, Texas. The town was founded on lands previously occupied by the Colonia de Agua Verde.

In February 1861 the village was attacked by a large force of Lipan Apache people. Some casualties were reported, among them was an old veteran of the Texas Independence and Texas Ranger, Damacio Galván. The Lipans carried off some 500 head of cattle, as well as some children from the town. This fierce attack discouraged many of the settlers and the town's population diminished drastically, many of the families from San Antonio returned to Texas.

During the mid to late 1860s, more settlers arrived from neighboring towns, and the town prospered. In 1875, the villa was renamed "Jiménez" in honor of Mariano Jiménez, a leader during Mexico's Independence movement.

On September 26, 1906 the first armed rebellion against the dictatorship of Porfirio Díaz, precursor to the Mexican Revolution began in Jiménez, it was led by Juan José Arredondo and Calixto Guerra, members of the Partido Liberal Mexicano of Ricardo Flores Magon. The movement was short lived as Federal troop reinforcements from Piedras Negras, surprised and dispersed the revolutionaries the next day at Hacienda Victoria.

On June 24, 1908 another rebellion was attempted this time at Las Vacas (Cd. Acuña), by Benjamín Canales and Calixto Guerra. After a day-long battle and heavy losses on both sides, the federal garrison prevailed and the revolutionaries were forced to retreat across the border into Texas.

== Demography ==
In the 2010 census the municipality had a population of 9,935 inhabitants.

== Geography ==
Jiménez is located at 29°4′11″N 100°40′30″W, at an altitude of 250 metres (820 ft) above sea level.

=== Climate ===
The region of Jiménez has a hot, semi-arid climate. During the summer, the temperature averages (mean) between 79°F (26°C) and 88°F (31°C).

The highest precipitation is typically recorded in May, June, September, and October, with an average monthly downfall in the range of 300 to 400 mm.

== Natural resources ==
The region's main resources are agriculture and livestock.

== Education ==
The municipality of Jiménez has a total of 33 primary schools, and 5 secondary schools.

== Tourism ==
- The Plaza Francisco I. Madero
- Monument to Ricardo Flores Magón and the Revolutionaries of Sept. 26, 1906
- The Old Cemetery
- The San Diego River
- Hacienda Victoria

== List of Presidentes Municipales ==
- Regino R. Garza (1912)
- Félix Arreola (1913) (1914–1917)
- Úrsulo Villarreal (1918)
- Félix Arreola Martínez (1919–1920)
- Ramón Faz de Hoyos (1921–1922)
- Encarnación Domínguez (1923–1924)
- Pedro Villarreal Guerra (1925–1926)
- Herculano Villarreal (1927–1928)
- José Moreno Rivas (1929–1930)
- Rutilo Guerra (1931–1932)
- José Moreno Rivas (1933–1934)
- Jesús E. Sánchez (1935–1936)
- Silverio Campos (1937–1938) PNR
- Epifanio Martínez (1939–1940) PRM
- Alejandro Siller (1941–1942) PRM
- Dionisio Pérez Faz (1943–1945) PRM
- Pedro Bravo Zertuche (1946–1948) PRI
- José V. Sánchez (1949–1951) PRI
- Cruz Olivo Rico (1952–1954) PRI
- Justo Guerra Arreola (1955–1957) PRI
- José Sánchez Arreola (1958–1960) PRI
- Anselmo Balderas Abundis (1961–1963) PRI
- Emilio Ramírez Escobedo (1964–1966) PRI
- Ignacio Rivero Ríos (1967–1969) PRI
- J. Cruz Olivo Rico (1970–1972) PRI
- Apolonio Martínez Rodríguez (1973–1975) PRI
- Ma. del Consuelo Villarreal Pérez de G. (1976–1978) PRI
- Miguel Lozano Arizpe (1979–1981) PRI
- Adolfo Narváez Faz (1982–1984) PRI
- Ludivina Hernández de Treviño (1985–1987) PRI
- Evelio Celedón Banda (1988–1990) PRI
- Pedro Bravo Berlanga (1991–1993) PRI
- Faustino Infante Regalado (1994–1996) PRI
- Juan Antonio Balderas Balboa (1997–1999) PRI
- Federico Ordóñez Coronado (2000–2002) PRI
- Agapito Balderas Elizondo (2003–2005) PRI
- Francisco Trujillo Reyes (2006–2008) COAL.
- Mario Robles Molina (2008–2009) COAL.
- Juan Antonio Balderas Balboa (2010–2013) PRI
- Salvador Ricardo Lozano Arizpe (2014-2017) COAL.

== Notable people ==
- Calixto Guerra - Jiménez Revolutionary of 1906 and Las Vacas in 1908
- Vicente Arreola Herrera (1875–1935) - Mining Engineer, industrialist

== Jiménez in popular culture ==
- In the opening jail scene in the 1992 film El Mariachi by writer/director Robert Rodriguez.
- The 2005 film The Three Burials of Melquiades Estrada directed by Tommy Lee Jones, the town that Jones' character is trying to return the body of Melquiades Estrada for burial.
