= Bobadilla del Campo =

Coordinates: 41°12′N 5°01′W

Bobadilla del Campo, Spain
- Flag Coat of arms

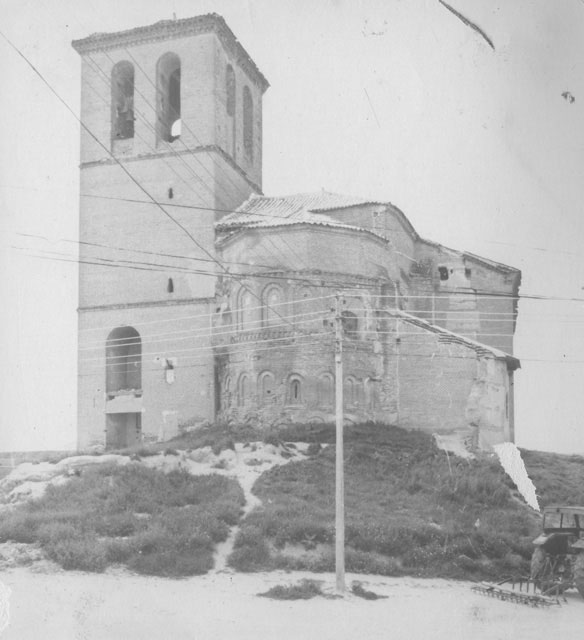
- Church of San Matias
- Country: Spain
- Autonomous community: Castile and León
- Province: Valladolid
- Municipality: Bobadilla del Campo

Area
  - Total: 32.70 km^{2} (12.63 sq mi)
- Elevation: 760 m (2,490 ft)

Population (2025-01-01)
  - Total: 279
  - Density: 8.53/km^{2} (22.1/sq mi)
- Time zone: UTC+1 (CET)
  - Summer (DST): UTC+2 (CEST)

Bobadilla del Campo is a municipality in the province of Valladolid, Castile and León, Spain.

According to the 2004 census (INE), the municipality had a population of 385 inhabitants.
