= Governor Torre =

Governor Torre may refer to:

- Carlos María de la Torre y Navacerrada, Governor-General of the Philippines
- Egidio Torre Cantú (born 1957), Governor of Tamaulipas, Mexico
- Francisco Mier y Torre, Governor of Nuevo León, Mexico
- Luis de la Torre, Governor of New Spain
- Miguel de la Torre (1786–1843), Governor of Puerto Rico

== See also ==
- Governor Torres (disambiguation)
