= Bobadilla, La Rioja =

Bobadilla
- Municipality
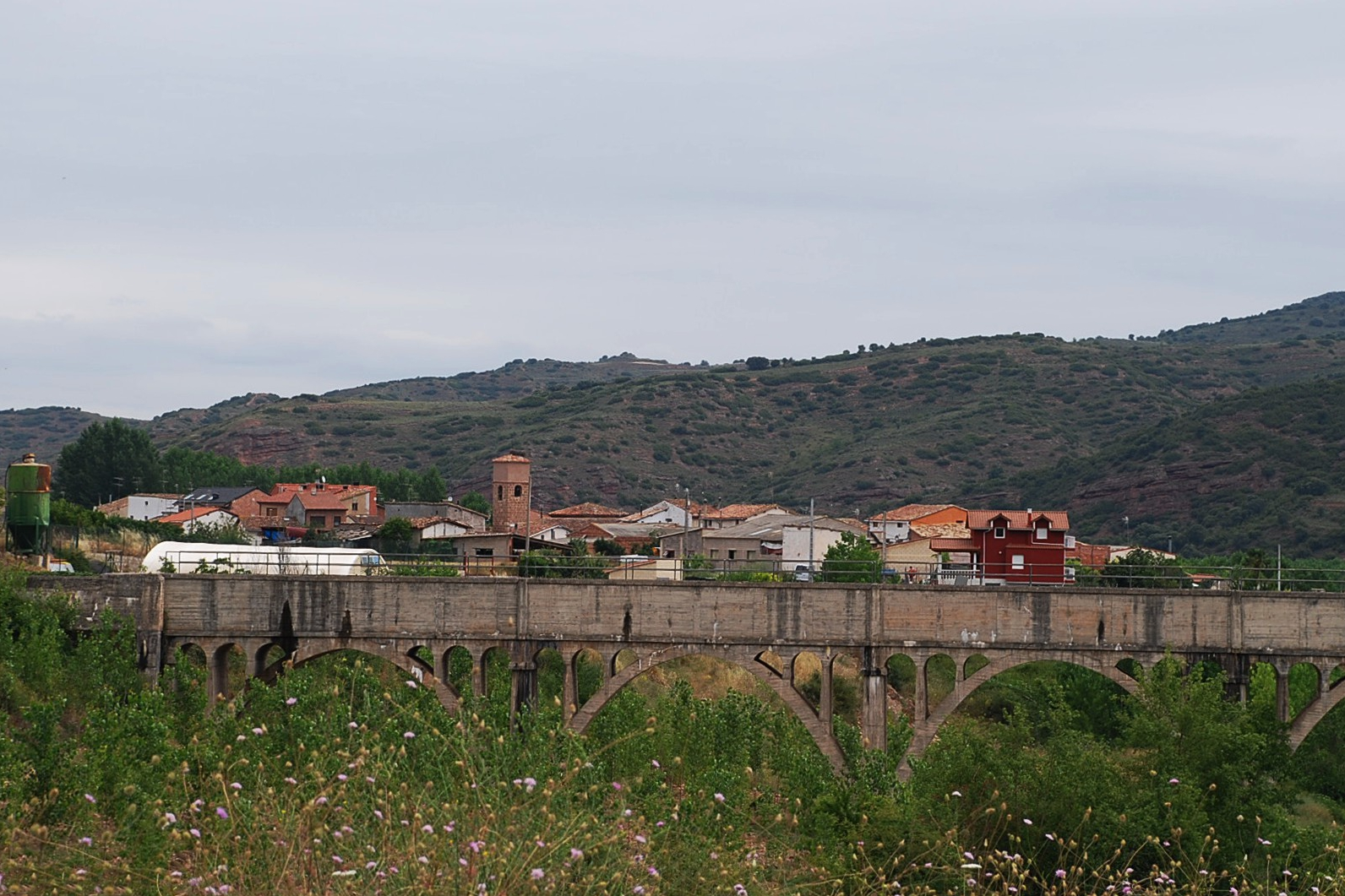
- Bobadilla

- Location in La Rioja

- Location in La Rioja Location in Spain
- Coordinates: 42°19′3″N 2°45′33″W
- Country: Spain
- Autonomous community: La Rioja
- Comarca: Nájera

Government
  - Alcalde: Miguel Ángel Rodríguez Neila (People's Party)

Area
  - Total: 4.66 km^{2} (1.80 sq mi)

Population (2025-01-01)
  - Total: 103
  - Density: 22.1/km^{2} (57.2/sq mi)
- Website: Official website

Bobadilla is a municipality in the Province of La Rioja, Spain.
