= Bareiro =

Bareiro is a surname. Notable people with the surname include:

- Adam Bareiro (born 1996), Paraguayan footballer
- Antonio Bareiro (born 1989), Paraguayan footballer
- Cándido Bareiro (1833–1880), President of Paraguay
- Diego Bareiro (born 1991), Paraguayan basketball player
- Fredy Bareiro (born 1982), Paraguayan footballer
- Nery Bareiro (born 1988), Paraguayan footballer
