= Bobadilla (surname) =

Bobadilla is a surname of Spanish origin. Notable people with this surname include:

- Aldo Bobadilla (b. 1976), Paraguayan professional football player
- Beatriz de Bobadilla (1440–1511), Spanish noblewoman, confidant and advisor to Queen Isabella I of Castile
- Beatriz de Bobadilla y Ossorio, (1462–1501), Spanish noblewoman, ruler of La Gomera and El Hierro
- Damián Bobadilla (b. 2001), Paraguayan professional football player
- Daniela Bobadilla, (b.1993), Mexican-Canadian actress
- Diego López Pacheco Cabrera y Bobadilla, marqués de Villena (1599–1653), Spanish nobleman; viceroy of New Spain 1640–42
- Francisco de Bobadilla (b. unknown, d. 1502), Spanish colonial administrator
- Francisco Mendoza de Bobadilla (1508–1566), Spanish Roman Catholic cardinal
- Geronimo de Bobadilla (b. unknown, d. 1680), Spanish Baroque painter
- Isabel de Bobadilla (b. unknown, d. 1543), Spanish noblewoman, wife of Hernando de Soto; governor of Cuba
- Nicholas Bobadilla (1511–1590), Spanish Roman Catholic priest; one of the first Jesuits
- Raúl Bobadilla (b. 1987), Argentine professional football player
- Tomás Bobadilla (1785 – 1871), Dominican Republic president, senator and magistrate

== See also ==
- Bobadilla (disambiguation)
