= Jericó Abramo Masso =

Mexican politician (born 1975)

- Born: 17 October 1975 (age 51); Saltillo, Coahuila, Mexico
- Occupation: Politician
- Political party: Institutional Revolutionary Party

Jericó Abramo Masso (first name also spelled Yericó; born 17 October 1975) is a Mexican politician affiliated with the Institutional Revolutionary Party (PRI). In the 2024 general election he was elected to his fourth term in the Chamber of Deputies.

== Life ==
Abramo received his undergraduate degree in business administration from the Universidad Autónoma del Noreste in Saltillo in 1997; during the three years he studied for the degree, he was the sales manager at Inmobiliaria Iconosa S.A. de C.V. and head of sales at Inmobiliaria y Constructora del Noreste, S.A. de C.V. From 1995 to 2004, he owned Pecos Steak House, directing it from 1996 to 1998.

The late 1990s saw Abramo's entry into the PRI. He was the deputy chief of financing for the state party and founded the Business Political Institute at the same time between 1998 and 1999. He also worked as social management coordinator on the party's 1999 Saltillo municipal presidential campaign. Between 1999 and 2001, he was the secretary general of the Saltillo chapter of the Confederación Nacional de Organizaciones Populares, and from 2001 to 2002, he headed the PRI in Saltillo while serving as a state-level party councilor.

In 2000, voters sent Abramo to his first public office, as a city councilor. When his three-year term concluded, he moved to direct the city's public services department, a post he left in 2005 to coordinate a state program titled "24 Municipalities of Coahuila".

In 2006 Abramo was elected to represent Coahuila's fourth federal district in the 60th session of Congress. He served as president on a special commission to investigate the Pasta de Conchos mine disaster that occurred in San Juan de Sabinas, Coahuila, in which 65 miners perished. He also served on the Communications, Economy, Youth and Sports, and Special for the Cuenca de Burgos Region Commissions, and as a national councillor for the PRI.

A year after his first term as a deputy ended, Abramo returned to public office, this time as the municipal president of Saltillo, from 2010 to 2013. During this time, he spent a year as the vice president of the National Federation of Municipalities of Mexico. At the end of his term, he decided to move to Mexico City with his family instead of taking on a position in the state government or running as a local deputy in 2014. Instead, in 2014, Abramo became the state president of Fundación Colosio, A.C.

In the 2015 mid-terms, Abramo returned to the Chamber of Deputies, this time, from Coahuila's seventh district. He was the secretary of the Energy and Cooperative Development and Social Economy Commissions, and a member of three others.

Masso indicated his interest in potentially seeking the PRI gubernatorial nomination in the 2017 election.

Voters in Coahuila's fourth district returned him to the Chamber of Deputies for a third term in the 2021 general election and re-elected him for the same seat in the 2024 general election.

== See also ==
- List of presidents of Saltillo Municipality
