= Héctor Franco López =

Mexican politician

- Born: 20 February 1963 (age 63); Tapachula, Chiapas, Mexico
- Occupation: Politician
- Political party: PRI

Héctor Franco López (born 20 February 1963) is a Mexican politician from the Institutional Revolutionary Party (PRI). From 2009 to 2011 he served as a federal deputy in the 61st session of Congress, representing Coahuila's seventh district.
