= General Cepeda =

City in the Mexican state of Coahuila

General Cepeda San Francisco de los Patos
- Municipal seat and city
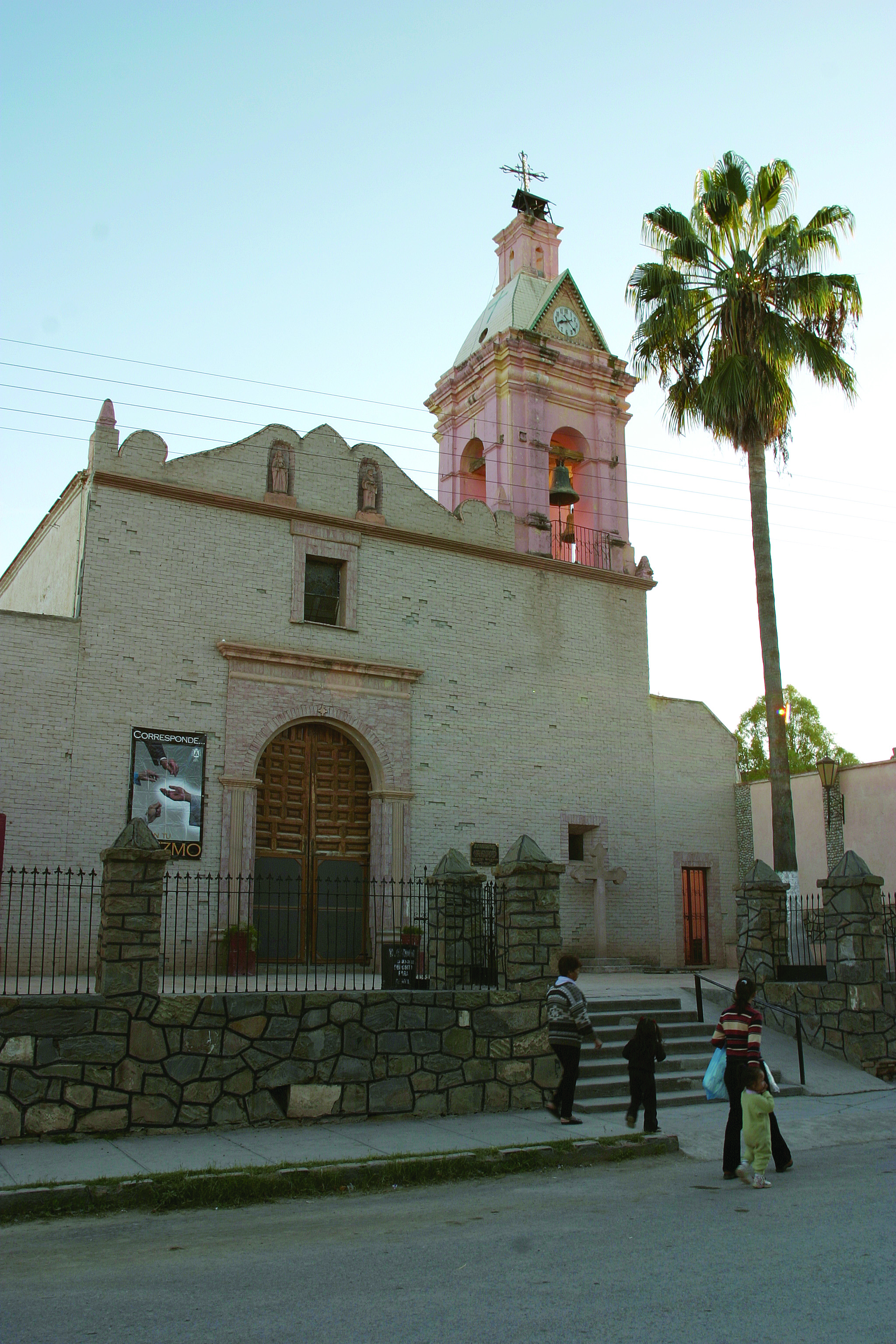
- San Francisco de Asis cathedral

- Location in Mexico
- Coordinates: 25.379°N 101.479°W
- Country: Mexico
- State: Coahuila
- Municipality: General Cepeda
- Established: 1575

Population (2010)
  - Total: 4,382

General Cepeda is a city and seat of the municipality of General Cepeda, in the north-eastern Mexican state of Coahuila. The town is named after Victoriano Cepeda Camacho (1826-1892), a general and a governor of Coahuila. Until 1892, the town was named San Francisco de los Patos and had been the headquarters for two of the largest estates in all of the Americas. In 2023, General Cepeda was designated a Pueblo Mágico by the Mexican government, recognizing its cultural and historical importance.

== History ==
Until 1892, General Cepeda was named San Francisco de los Patos. Patos was established in 1575 and initially the land was owned by Francisco de Urdiñola. From the 16th to the 19th centuries, the "splendid hacienda" in the town was the headquarters of two of the largest latifundios (land holdings) in the Americas. Urdiñola began what came to be called the Marquisate of San Miguel de Aguayo which, after bankruptcy, was purchased by the Sánchez Navarro family in 1840. After the expropriation of the Sánchez Navarro latifundio in 1866, the Patos headquarters became the municipal building of General Cepeda.

== Geography ==
The town of General Cepeda is located about 50 kilometres (31 mi) in straight-line distance west of the state capital of Saltillo. General Cepeda has an elevation of 1,466 metres (4,810 ft). The town is located in the northern foothills of the Sierra de Los Patos (Duck Mountains) which at La Concordia Mountain reach a maximum elevation of 3,441 metres (11,289 ft). The mountains are cooler and receive more precipitation than the surrounding desert and the waterways flowing down from the mountains made the General Cepeda area feasible for irrigated agriculture and attractive to Spanish settlers in the 16th and 17th centuries. When the Spanish first visited the area in 1568, a small lake they called Laguna de los Patos (Duck Lake) was near what became the town.

=== Climate ===
General Cepeda is on the southern edge of the Chihuahua Desert and has a Köppen classification BSh climate (warm, semi-arid steppe), although its annual average precipitation of 347 millimetres (13.7 in) is barely more than the upper limit of precipitation of BWh (desert) climates. Under the Trewartha system, the climate is classified as BWab (semi-arid steppe with hot summers and warm winters). Most of the precipitation is in the summer months from June to September.

Climate data for General Cepeda (1991–2020)
Month	Jan	Feb	Mar	Apr	May	Jun	Jul	Aug	Sep	Oct	Nov	Dec	Year
Record high °C (°F)	36.0 (96.8)	37.5 (99.5)	50.0 (122.0)	42.0 (107.6)	46.0 (114.8)	42.0 (107.6)	41.0 (105.8)	41.0 (105.8)	41.0 (105.8)	38.0 (100.4)	38.0 (100.4)	35.0 (95.0)	50.0 (122.0)
Mean daily maximum °C (°F)	20.3 (68.5)	23.4 (74.1)	26.7 (80.1)	30.1 (86.2)	33.3 (91.9)	33.6 (92.5)	33.1 (91.6)	32.5 (90.5)	29.4 (84.9)	28.2 (82.8)	24.2 (75.6)	21.1 (70.0)	28.0 (82.4)
Daily mean °C (°F)	12.9 (55.2)	15.4 (59.7)	18.3 (64.9)	21.5 (70.7)	24.7 (76.5)	25.5 (77.9)	25.3 (77.5)	24.7 (76.5)	22.2 (72.0)	20.3 (68.5)	16.4 (61.5)	13.6 (56.5)	20.1 (68.1)
Mean daily minimum °C (°F)	5.6 (42.1)	7.4 (45.3)	9.9 (49.8)	12.8 (55.0)	16.1 (61.0)	17.3 (63.1)	17.4 (63.3)	16.9 (62.4)	15.0 (59.0)	12.4 (54.3)	8.7 (47.7)	6.1 (43.0)	12.1 (53.8)
Record low °C (°F)	−7.0 (19.4)	−12.0 (10.4)	−6.0 (21.2)	−0.3 (31.5)	3.0 (37.4)	8.0 (46.4)	9.0 (48.2)	1.0 (33.8)	0.0 (32.0)	0.0 (32.0)	−7.5 (18.5)	−11.0 (12.2)	−12.0 (10.4)
Average precipitation mm (inches)	12.5 (0.49)	7.8 (0.31)	12.5 (0.49)	10.5 (0.41)	24.7 (0.97)	50.7 (2.00)	66.4 (2.61)	76.9 (3.03)	55.3 (2.18)	23.9 (0.94)	8.2 (0.32)	11.5 (0.45)	360.9 (14.2)
Average precipitation days (≥ 0.1 mm)	2.6	1.6	2.0	2.0	5.0	7.2	8.1	8.5	8.1	3.8	2.2	2.5	53.6
Source: Servicio Meteorologico Nacional

== See also ==
- José de Azlor y Virto de Vera, the Marques de San Miguel del Aguayo
- Sánchez Navarro ranch, this large estate in the 18th and 19th centuries was based in San Francisco de los Patos, now General Cepeda.
