= Diana Patricia González Soto =

Mexican politician

- Born: 22 February 1964 (age 62); Coahuila, Mexico
- Occupation: Politician
- Political party: PRI

Diana Patricia González Soto (born 22 February 1964) is a Mexican politician from the Institutional Revolutionary Party (PRI). In 2010–2012 she served as a deputy in the 61st Congress, representing Coahuila's fourth district.
