= Jorge Torres López =

Mexican politician

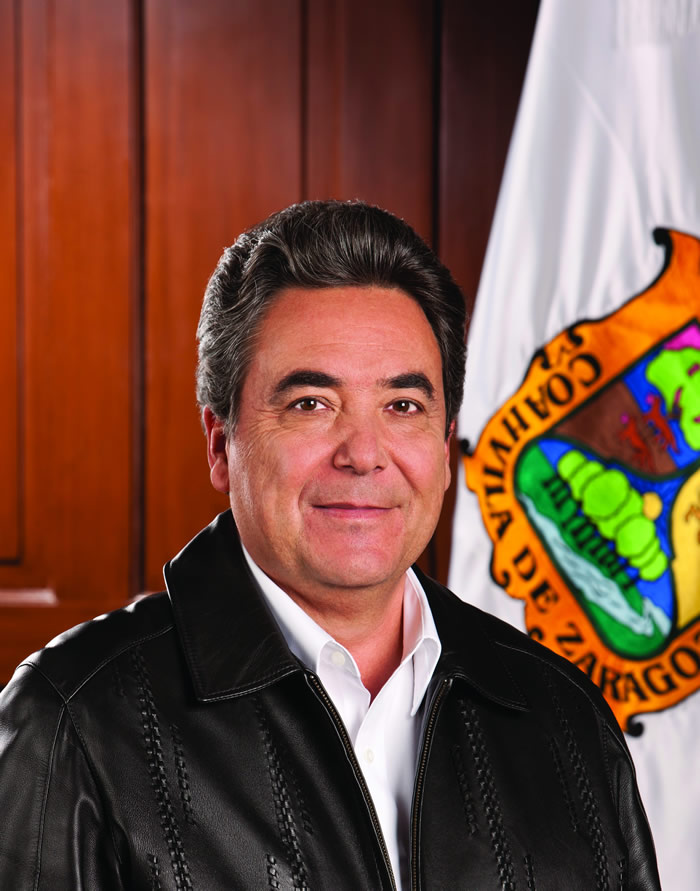

Governor of Coahuila
- In office January 4, 2011 – December 1, 2011
- Preceded by: Humberto Moreira
- Succeeded by: Rubén Moreira Valdez

Personal details
- Born: February 20, 1954 (age 72) Saltillo, Coahuila
- Party: Institutional Revolutionary Party

Jorge Juan Torres López (born February 20, 1954 Saltillo, Coahuilla) is a Mexican politician and member of the Institutional Revolutionary Party (PRI). Torres served as the Governor of Coahuila from January 4, 2011, until December 1, 2011.

Jorge Torres Lopez previously held office as the Municipal President of Saltillo from 2007 to 2009. In 2011, incumbent Coahuila Governor Humberto Moreira left office early to become President of the Institutional Revolutionary Party. The Coahuila State Congress selected Torres as interim Governor to fill out the remainder of Moreira's unexpired term.

Jorge Torres Lopez served as Governor until December 1, 2011, when he was succeeded by newly elected Governor Rubén Moreira Valdez.

== See also ==
- List of presidents of Saltillo Municipality
