= Congress of Coahuila =

Legislature of Coahuila, Mexico

Congress of Coahuila Congreso del Estado de Coahuila de Zaragoza
- LXIII Legislature

Type
- Type: Unicameral

Structure
- Seats: 25 diputados
- Political groups: PRI (10) MORENA (5) PAN (5) PRD (2) PT (1) PVEM (1) UDC (1)
- Length of term: 3 years
- Authority: Political Constitution of the State of Coahuila of Zaragoza
- Salary: $91,313 pesos per month

Elections
- Voting system: 16 with first-past-the-post and 9 with proportional representation
- Last election: 4 June 2023
- Next election: 2026

Meeting place
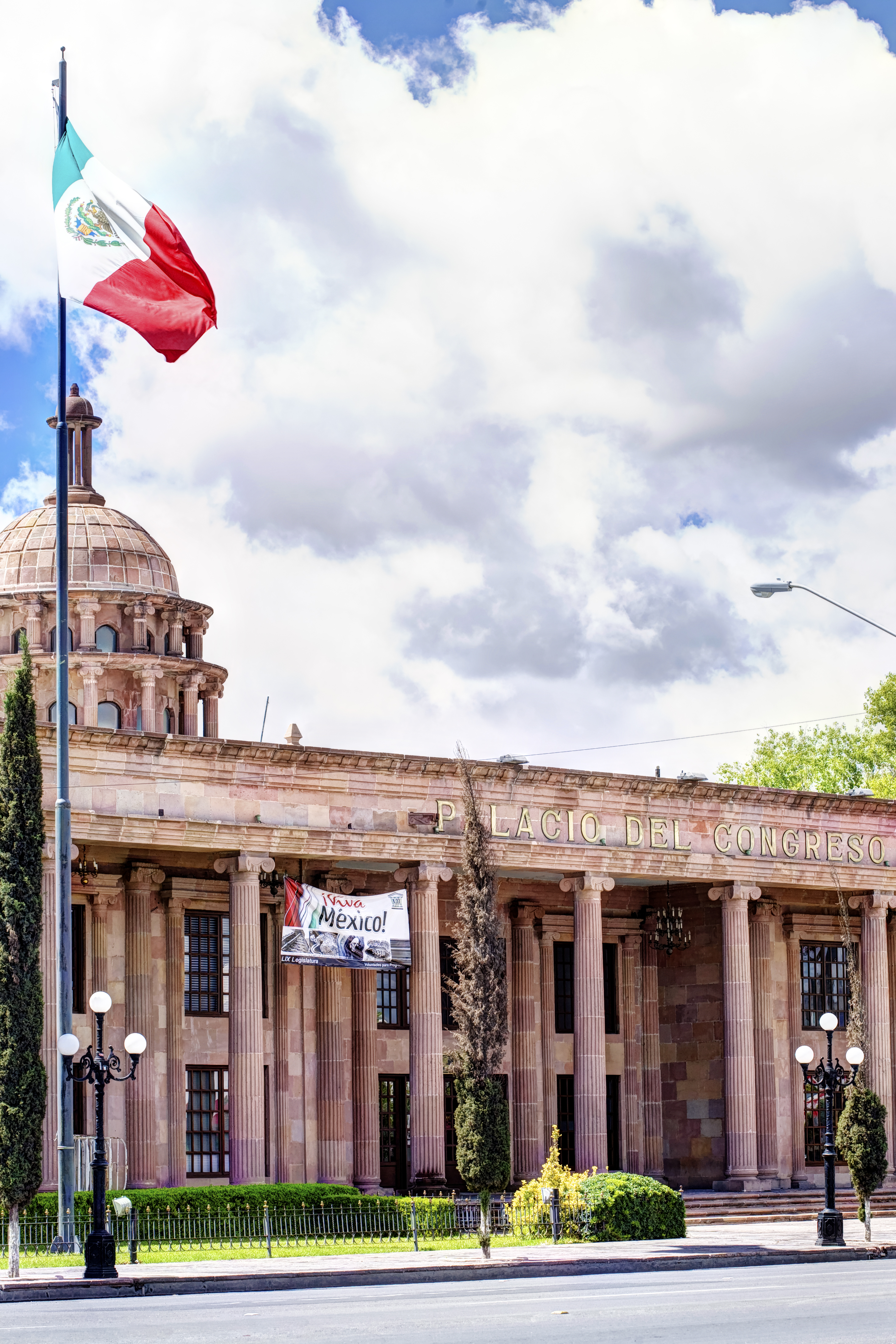
- Palacio del Congreso; Blvd. Francisco Coss s/n esquina Obregón, Saltillo, Coahuila, Mexico

Website
- congresocoahuila.gob.mx

The Congress of the State of Coahuila de Zaragoza (Spanish: Congreso del Estado de Coahuila de Zaragoza) is the state legislature of Coahuila, a state of Mexico. The Congress is unicameral.

The Congress has 25 members: 16 elected in single-member districts via first-past-the-post voting and 9 elected via proportional representation.

== Current composition by party ==
The LXIII Legislature of the Congress of Coahuila consists of 25 deputies.

Party	Deputies
Institutional Revolutionary Party	10
MORENA	5
National Action Party	5
Party of the Democratic Revolution	2
Labor Party	1
Ecologist Green Party of Mexico	1
Democratic Unity of Coahuila	1

== See also ==
- List of Mexican state congresses
