= Saltillo Municipality =

Municipality in the Mexican state of Coahuila

Saltillo
- Municipality
- Coat of arms

- Municipality of Saltillo in Coahuila
- Coordinates: 25°23′59″N 101°59′17″W
- Country: Mexico
- State: Coahuila
- Founded: 1827
- Seat: Saltillo
- Largest city: Saltillo

Government
  - Municipal president: José María Fraustro Siller

Area
  - Total: 6,837 km^{2} (2,640 sq mi)

Population (2020)
  - Total: 879,958
- Website: https://saltillo.gob.mx

Saltillo is one of the 38 municipalities of Coahuila, in north-eastern Mexico. The municipal seat lies at Saltillo. The municipality covers an area of 6837 km^{2}.

As of 2020, the municipality had a total population of 879,958, making it the most populous municipality in Coahuila.

The municipal government is headed by the municipal president of Saltillo (or mayor of Saltillo).
