= Salomon Juan Marcos Issa =

Mexican politician

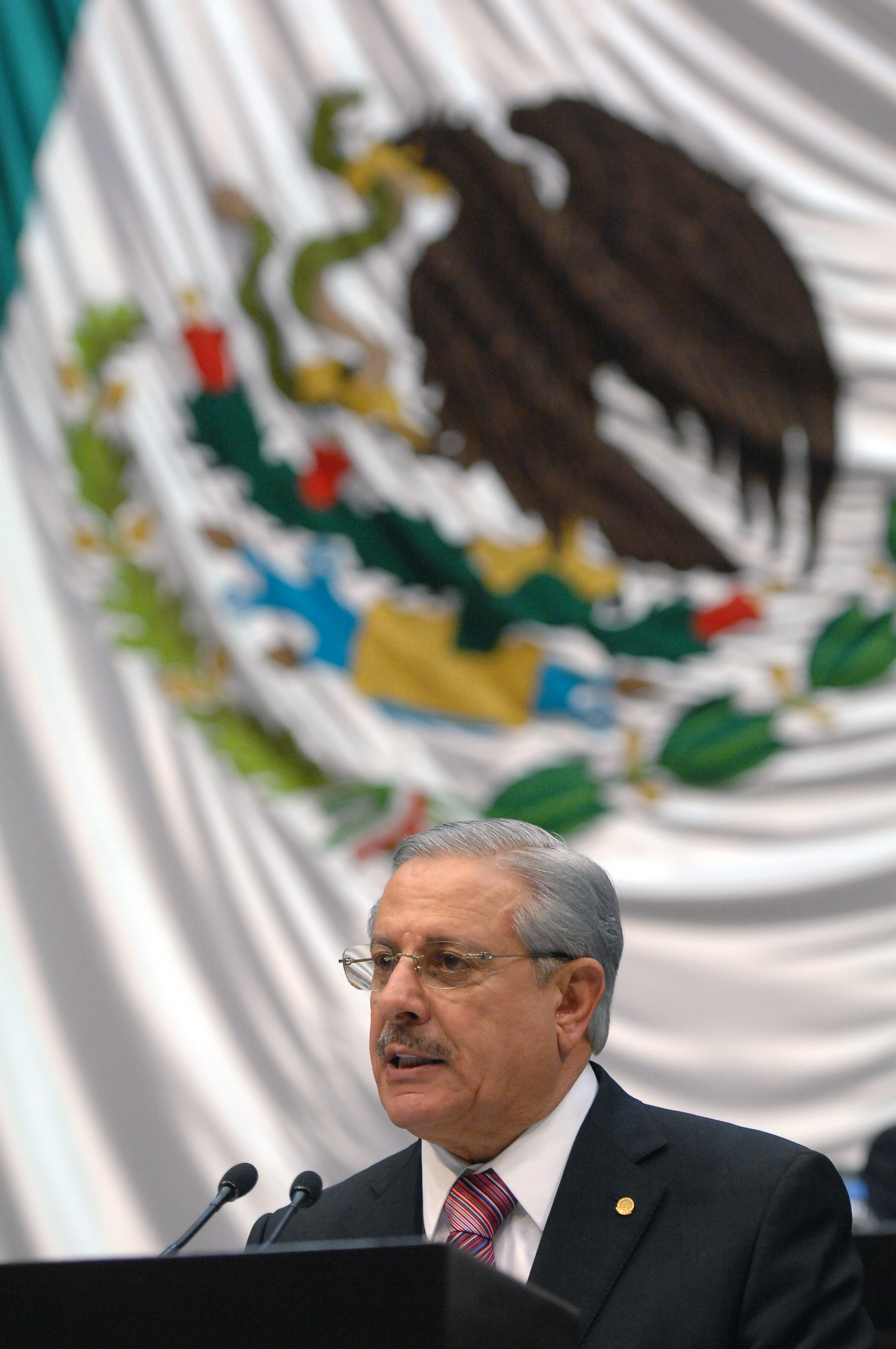

Member of the Chamber of Deputies for Coahuila′s 5th district
- In office 1 September 2012 – 31 August 2015
- Preceded by: Miguel Ángel Riquelme Solís
- Succeeded by: Flor Estela Rentería Medina

Mayor of Torreón, Coahuila, Mexico
- In office 2000–2002
- Preceded by: Jorge Zermeño Infante
- Succeeded by: Guillermo Anaya Llamas

Personal details
- Born: 5 July 1948 (age 78) Torreón, Coahuila
- Party: Institutional Revolutionary Party (PRI)
- Spouse: Rocío Villarreal Asúnsolo
- Children: Salomón, Antonio y Rocío
- Education: Autonomous University of Coahuila
- Occupation: Politician

Salomon Juan Marcos Issa (born July 5, 1948 in Torreón, Coahuila) is a Mexican politician. Currently is federal congressman in the LXII Legislature of the Mexican Congress. Also has been municipal president of Torreón in Coahuila during 2000 to 2002.

== Biography ==
Second child of businessman Antonio Juan Marcos and his wife Issa Habib. He studied licenciature in Business Management in the Autonomous University of Coahuila. He is married with Rocío Villarreal Asúnsolo and has three children: Salomón, Antonio y Rocío. Juan Marcos has stood out as businessman in denim manufacturing industry.

His political activity started in 1996, when he was candidate to be municipal presidente (Mayor) of Torreón but it was defeated by Jorge Zermeño Infante of the (PAN) in that chance.

Between 2000 and 2002 he was elected as mayor of Torreón. Before that, between 2003 and 2005, was representative in Coahuila's Congress. During 2006 was candidate to Senator. In Mexican general election in 2012 he gained a seat in the Chamber of Deputies as representative of Coahuila.

== See also ==
- Antonio Juan Marcos Villarreal
