= Mexican wine =

Wine making in Mexico

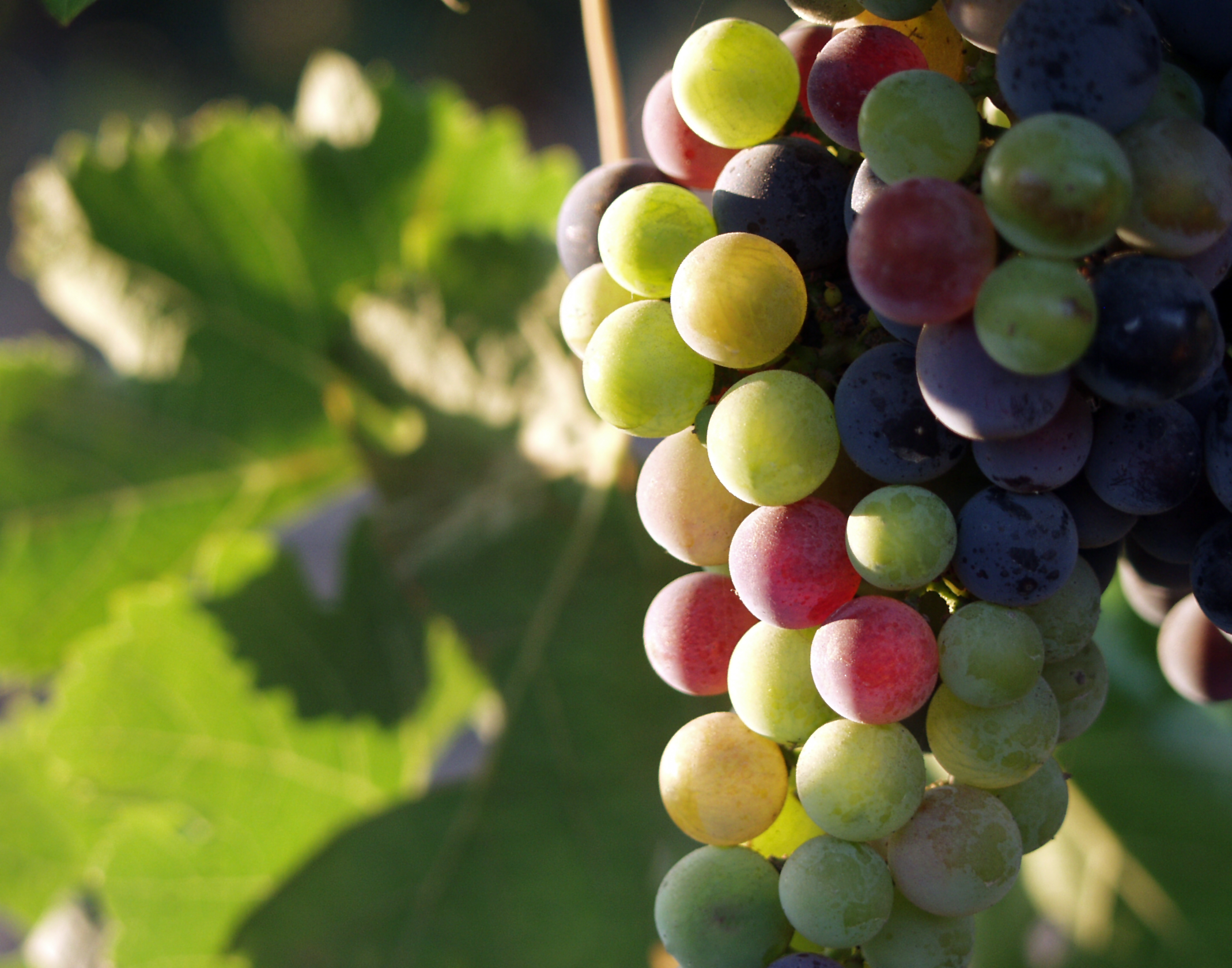
Grapes during pigmentation in Valle de Guadalupe, Baja California.

Mexican wine and wine making began with the arrival of the Spanish in the 16th century, when they brought vines from Europe to modern day Mexico, the oldest wine-growing region in the Americas. Although there were indigenous grapes before the Spanish conquest, the Spaniards found that Spanish grapevines also did very well in the colony of New Spain (Mexico) and by the 17th century wine exports from Spain to the New World fell. In 1699, Charles II of Spain prohibited wine making in Mexico, with the exception of wine for Church purposes. From then until Mexico’s Independence, wine was produced in Mexico only on a small scale.

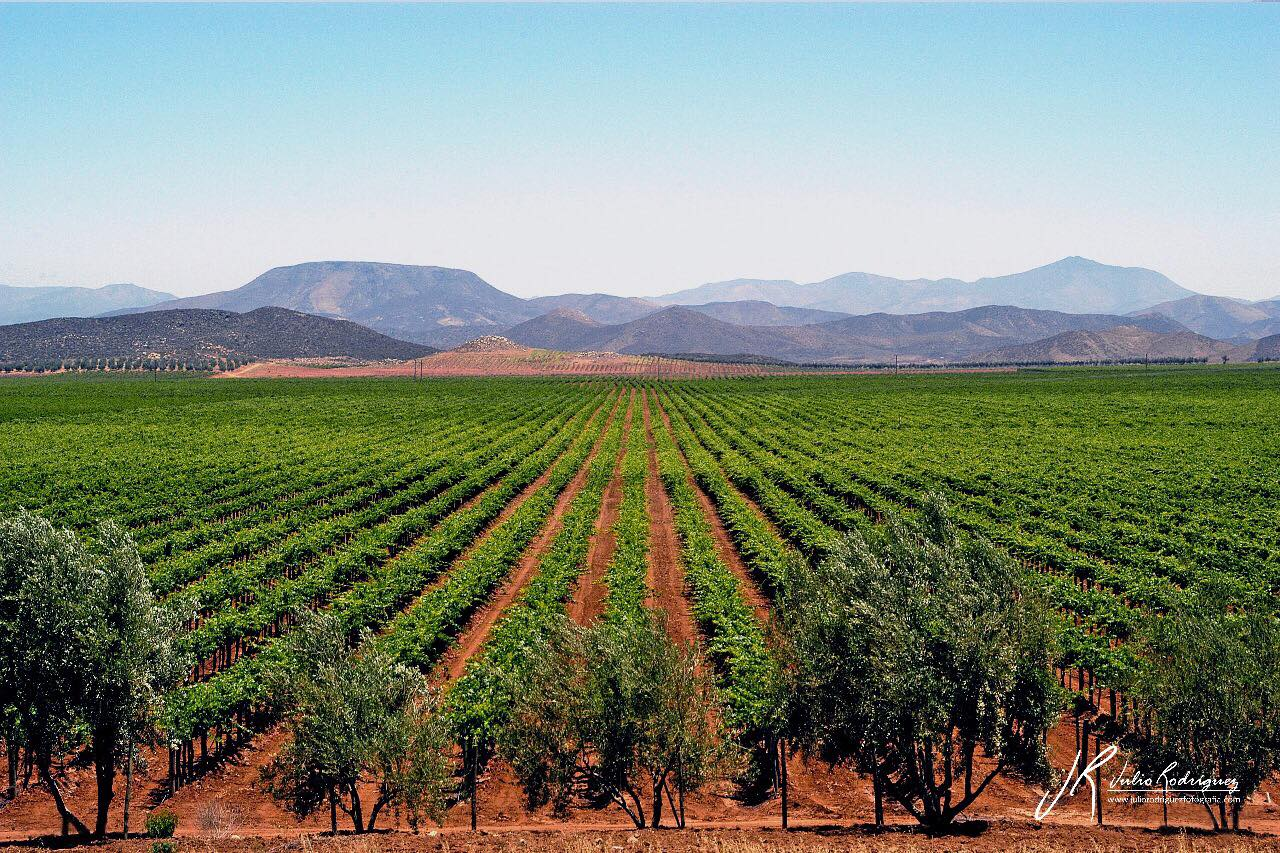
Vineyard in the Valle de San Vicente, Baja California by landscape photographer Julio Rodríguez

After Independence, wine making for personal purposes was no longer prohibited and production rose, especially in the late 19th and early 20th centuries. Many other European immigrant groups helped with the comeback of wine in Mexico. However, the Mexican Revolution set back wine production, especially in the north of the country. Wine production in Mexico has been rising in both quantity and quality since the 1980s, although competition from foreign wines and 40% tax on the product makes competing difficult within Mexico. Mexico is not traditionally a wine-drinking country, but rather prefers beer, tequila and mezcal. Interest in Mexican wine, especially in the major cities and tourists areas (along with the introduction into the US on a small scale), has grown along with Mexican wines’ reputation throughout the world. Many Mexican companies have received numerous awards. Various wine producers from Mexico have won international awards for their products. In 2020, the wine Don Leo Gran Reserva Cabernet Sauvignon won gold in the International Cabernet competition (CIDC) and the trophy for the world's best Cabernet. The wine is produced in Parras, Coahuila in the Northwestern region of Mexico.

There are three major wine-producing areas in Mexico, with the Baja California area producing 90% of Mexico’s wine. This area is promoted heavily for enotourism with the “Ruta del Vino” (Wine Route), which connects over fifty wineries with the port of Ensenada and the border and the annual Vendimia harvest festival.

== History of wine making in Mexico ==
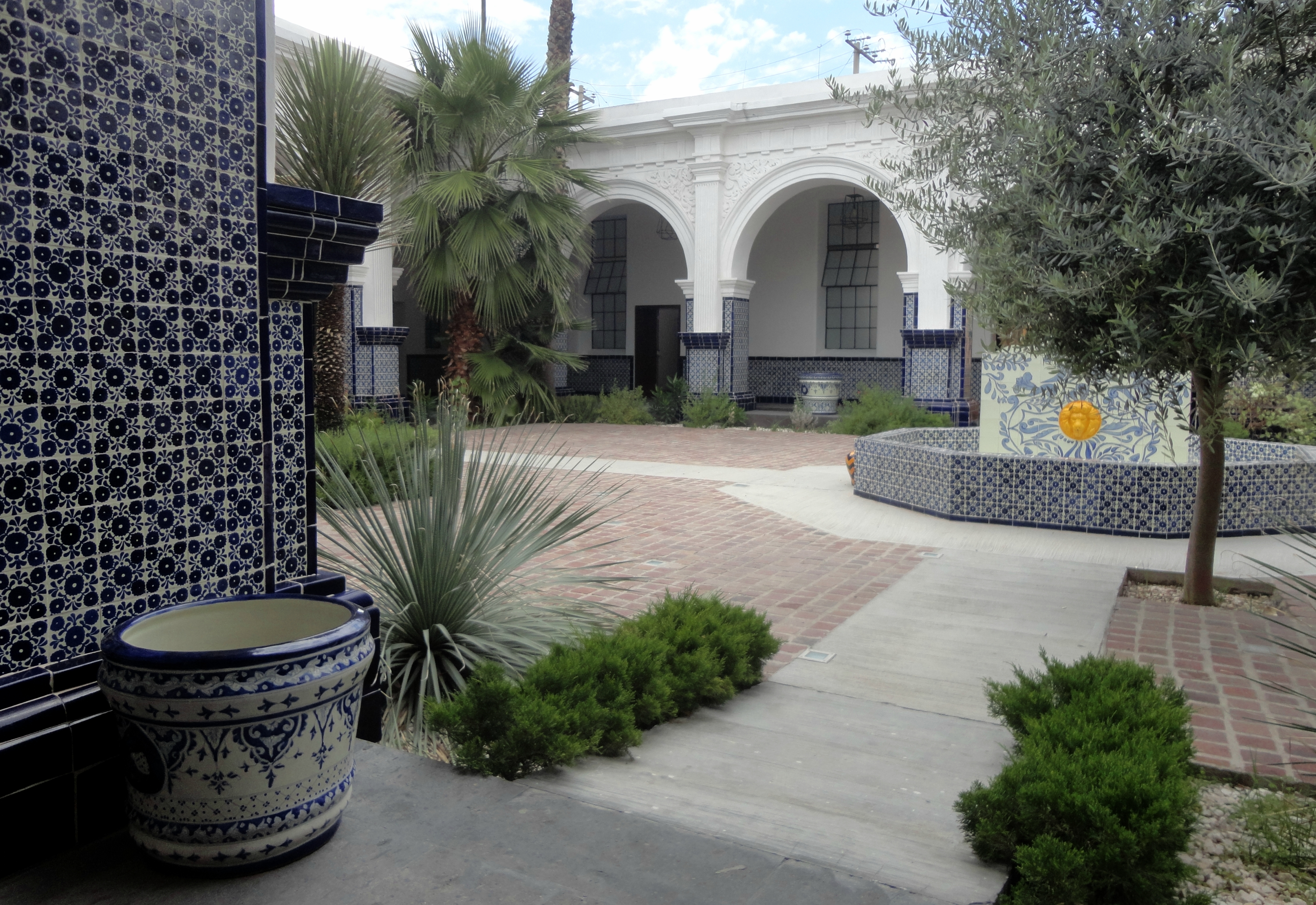
The Wine Museum in Dolores Hidalgo covers the history of wine making in Guanajuato

According to legend, Hernán Cortés and his soldiers quickly depleted the wine they brought with them from Spain celebrating the conquest of the Aztec Empire in 1521. Because of this, one of Cortés’ first acts as governor was to order the planting of grapevines throughout New Spain.

In the early colonial era, ships arriving to Mexico and Spain’s other colonies carried grapevines. In certain areas, Spaniards found a native type of grapevine, but it did not lend itself well to winemaking. However, vines from Europe grew very well here, and they were planted in monasteries and haciendas in the states of Puebla, Coahuila, Zacatecas and others.

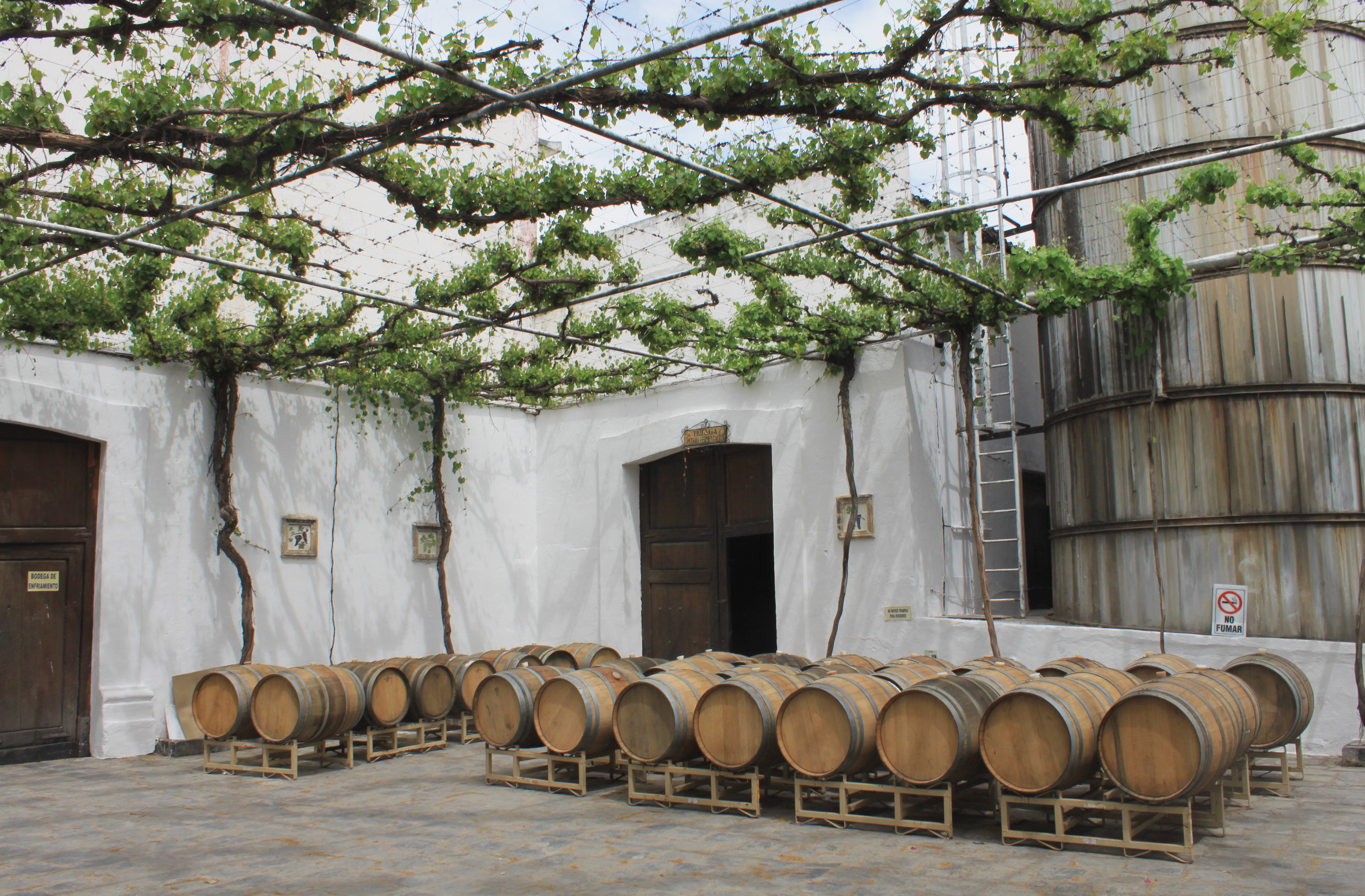
Casa Madero, the oldest winery in the Americas

In 1597, Casa Madero was founded by Lorenzo García in the town of Santa María de las Parras (Holy Mary of the Grapevines) and is now the oldest winery in the Americas. This area of Coahuila soon became a major wine producer due to its climate and good supplies of water. The vines that were established here were later exported to the Napa Valley in California and South America.

Vineyards in the Americas, especially New Spain were successful enough that wine exports from Spain to America plummeted. Because of this, the government of Charles II decided to prohibit the production of wine in Spain’s colonies, especially Mexico, except for the making of wine for the Church in 1699. That prohibition stayed in force until Mexico’s Independence. However, many missionaries refused to abide by the edict and continued to produce wine for normal consumption on a small scale. One of these was Jesuit priest Juan Ugarte, who planted the first vines in Baja California when he arrived at the Loreto mission in 1701.

From the end of the 18th century to the middle of the 19th, most wine production was done by clergy. The Santo Tomás Mission, founded in Baja California by Jesuit priests in 1791, reactivated larger scale production of wine in Mexico. In 1843, Dominican priests began growing grapes at the nearby Nuestra Señora de Guadalupe del Norte mission, located in what is now called Valle de Guadalupe. This valley is one of the few in the world, along with others such as the Napa Valley and the Rhone Valley, in which premium wine grapes can be grown.

In the 1850s, as part of Mexico’s Reform War, many of the Church’s land holdings were taken by the state. Most of the small wineries tended by missionaries were eventually abandoned. In 1888, the former lands of the Santo Tomás Mission were sold to a private group, which established the first large-scale commercial winery and the earliest winery in continuous operation, called Bodegas Santo Tomás. Initially, the wine made by the group was sweet and of low quality.

During the period of Mexican history known as the Porfiriato (1880–1910), wine production in Mexico increased and spread to other regions of the country. In the Baja California area in 1904, Russian immigrants known as Molokans, a pacifist religious group fleeing service in the Tsar's army, purchased 40 hectares (100 acres) of land and began producing wine grapes. They encouraged others to do the same, helping the area acquire a reputation for making good wine. However, winemaking was set back by the Mexican Revolution as many lands were abandoned by their owners or destroyed by the rebels.

Wine making in Mexico began to experience a comeback in the 1980s, with wine production peaking at four million cases a year in the latter part of the decade. However, the 1980s also opened Mexico’s small wine market to foreign competition, which hurt it. Baja California, which produces 90% of Mexico’s wine, only sells about 1.5 million cases a year today, but the quality of this wine is generally higher.

Since the 1980s, wine production, especially in Baja California, has been steadily improving with better tending of vineyards and incorporating modern advancements in winemaking. Most wineries here are young, established only since the 1980s and 1990s, but some enthusiasts are calling the Valley of Guadalupe area the “next Napa Valley.” The wine industry is growing rapidly and the quality of the wine is improving. Mexican wine can be found in 38 countries in the world and many vintages have won international awards.

== Wine consumption in Mexico today ==
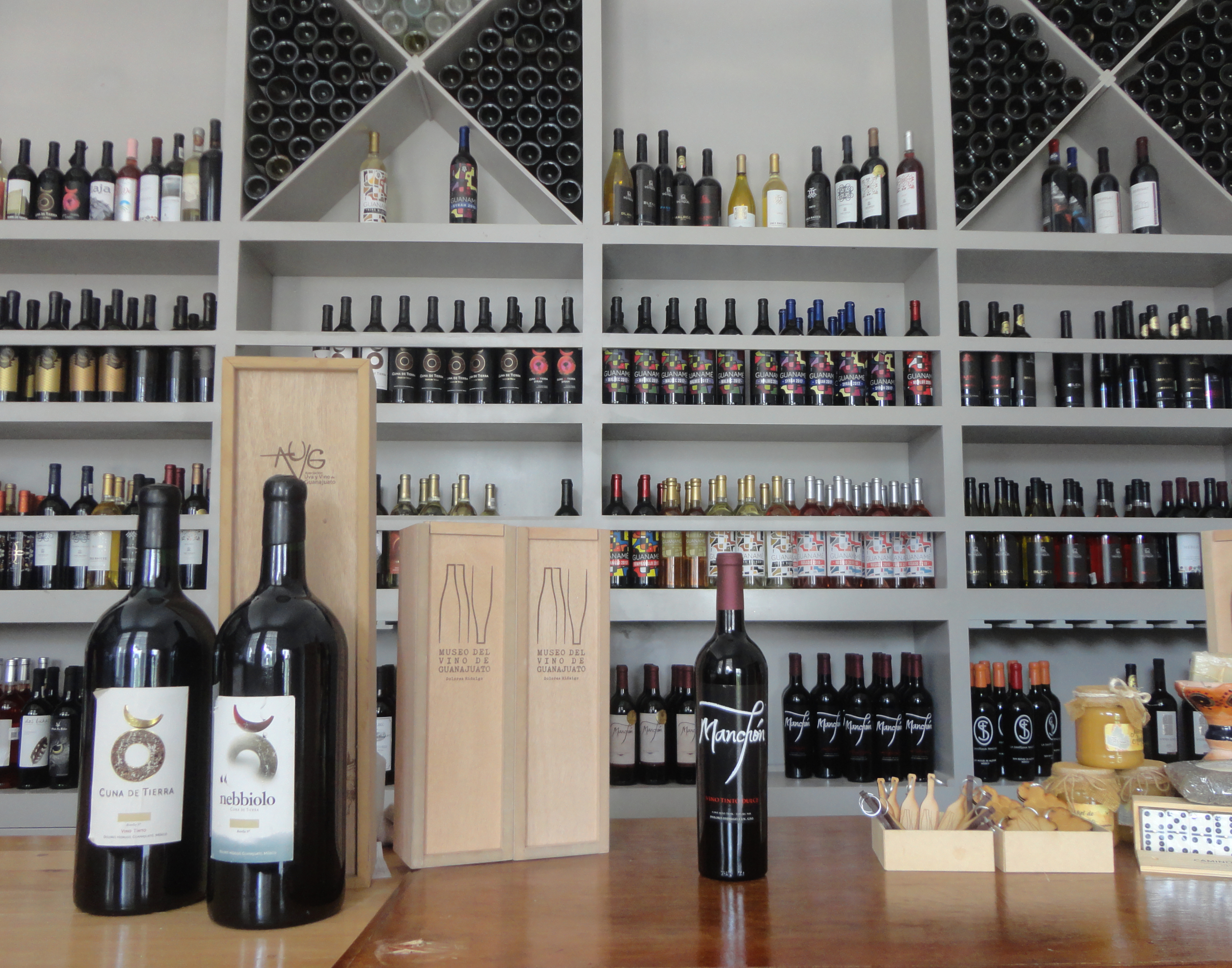
Different wines from Guanajuato

Despite Mexico’s Spanish heritage, it is not a major wine-drinking country; beer and tequila are far more popular than wine. Average wine consumption per capita is only two glasses a year. The Mexican government imposes taxes of 40% per bottle, making it hard to compete with beer and tequila. However, consumption of wine in Mexico is growing, with imports of wine in 2005 being nearly four times higher than ten years before. Most wine is consumed in major cities such as Mexico City, Monterrey, Guadalajara and Puebla, and is also commonly found in the tourist areas, such as Cancún and Cabo San Lucas.

Most of the wine consumed in Mexico is imported from Europe, Chile, Australia and New Zealand, with about forty percent coming from domestic wineries. However, wine consumption continues to grow with one factor being increased interest in it by the middle classes, especially in Mexico City. As the reputation of Mexican wines increases, preference for native wines is also increasing in Mexico. At one time, no sophisticated restaurant in Mexico City would serve Mexican wine. Today, newer restaurants always include selections from Mexico on their wine lists.

While wine drinking is not widespread in Mexico, the consumption of brandy, or distilled wine, is. Brandy is the most widespread distilled liquor in Mexico. It is even more popular than rum or tequila. Mexico is the fourth largest consumer of brandy in the world behind the Philippines, Germany and Equatorial Guinea. The last of Mexico's tariffs on imported brandy were lifted in the first decade of the 21st century, with sales and consumption expected to rise.

== Wine producing areas and vintages in Mexico ==
Nearly 2,500 hectares (6,200 acres) are planted to grapes in Mexico. Principal white wine grapes include chenin blanc, chardonnay, sauvignon blanc and viognier, and reds include all five Bordeaux varietals plus Grenache, tempranillo, dolcetto, syrah and petite sirah.

In March 2025, the Querétaro wine area was awarded the geographical indication 'Indicación Geográfica Protegida' (Vinos de la Región Vitivinícola de Querétaro) by the Mexican Institute of Industrial Property. This is historically the first Mexican region to be awarded this protection for its wines.

There are three areas in Mexico where wine grapes are grown. The North area includes Baja California and Sonora; the La Laguna area is in Coahuila and Durango and the Center area consists of Zacatecas, Aguascalientes and Querétaro. Most of these areas have a fairly warm climate, which tend to make Mexican wines spicy, full-bodied and ripe; however, Northern Baja California's humid winters, dry warm summers and sea breezes allow for most of the same varietals produced in California. The La Laguna region is the oldest wine-making area of Mexico, and straddles the states of Coahuila and Durango, with grapes thriving in the Parras Valley. This valley is a microclimate in the desert area of these states at an altitude of 1,500 meters. The valley has warm days, cool nights and low humidity which inhibits insect and fungus damage to the vines. Mountain springs provide sufficient water in this arid part of Mexico. The temperature difference of 12 °C (22 °F) between day and night is also beneficial to the grapes. The valley primarily produces reds based on Bordeaux such as cabernet sauvignon, Shiraz, merlot and Tempranillo. Some whites are produced as well. More than 400 families come to the Parras Valley in August and September for the annual grape harvest called “la vendimia.”

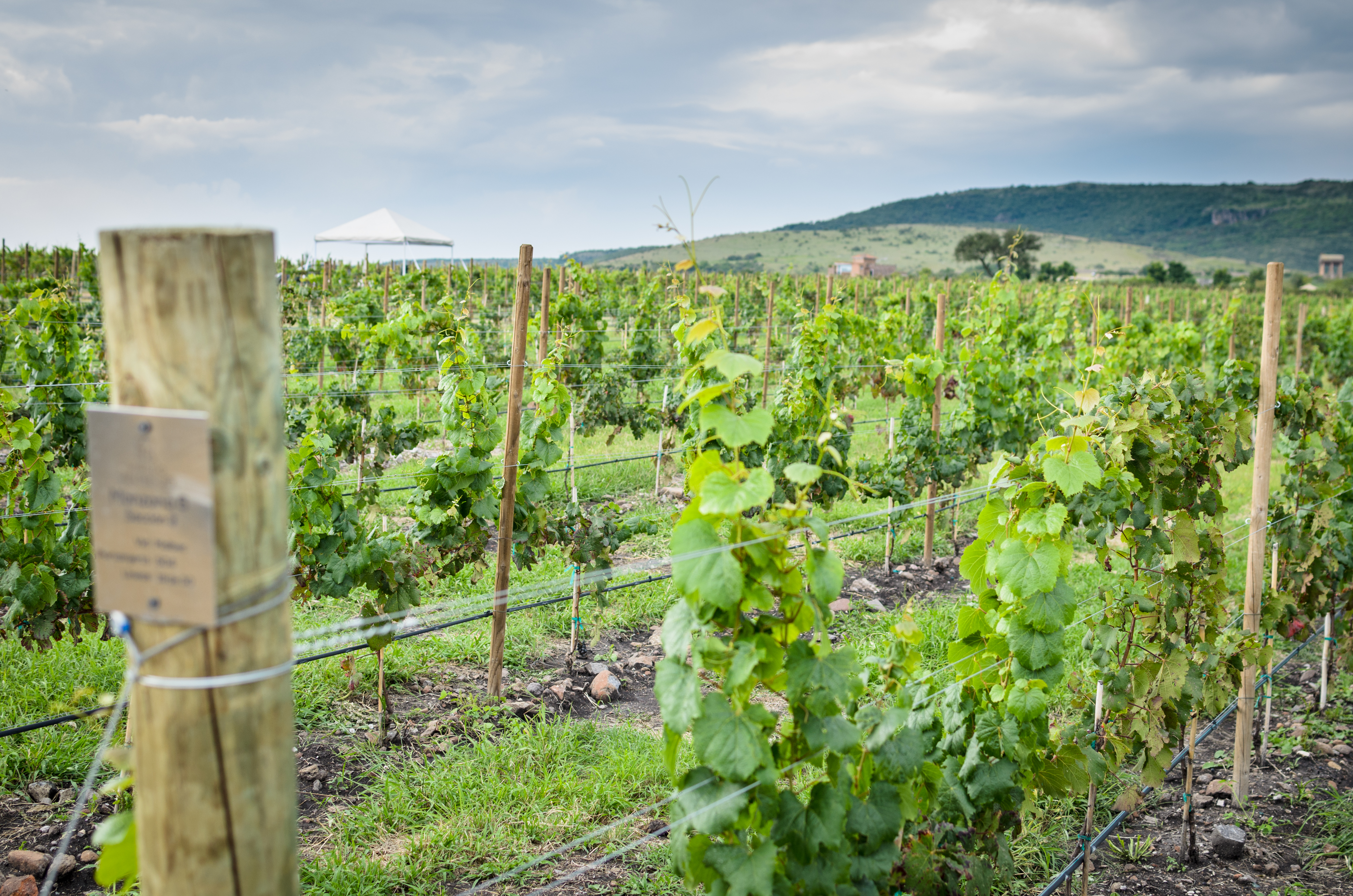
Vineyard in San Miguel de Allende, Guanajuato

The most important winery here is Casa Madero, the oldest winery in the New World, founded in 1597 as Hacienda San Lorenzo, Coahuila. This label includes a range of varietals, with its chardonnay, chenin blanc and Syrah winning awards. Its brandies are considered among the best in Mexico. Another important winery here is Bodegas Ferrino, founded by a 19th-century Italian immigrant near the town of Cuatro Ciénegas.

Another interesting winery is located in Tarahumara country at the edge of the Copper Canyon in Chihuahua, in a small valley named Cerocahui. In 1680, Father Juan María de Salvaterra arrived here to establish a mission. Later, Jesuits brought cuttings of French and Spanish vines. When the Jesuits were forced out of Mexico in the 18th century, the Cerocahui vineyards were destroyed except for a few cuttings secretly kept and grown by the José María Sánchez family. These vines were cared for by the family until the late 20th century, when the last of the family died without heirs. The gardener for the family saved cuttings from the vines and with the Misión Hotel and planted them at what was the Girls Boarding School. Since then the town has had over 4,000 vines under cultivation and a winery has been established at the hotel.

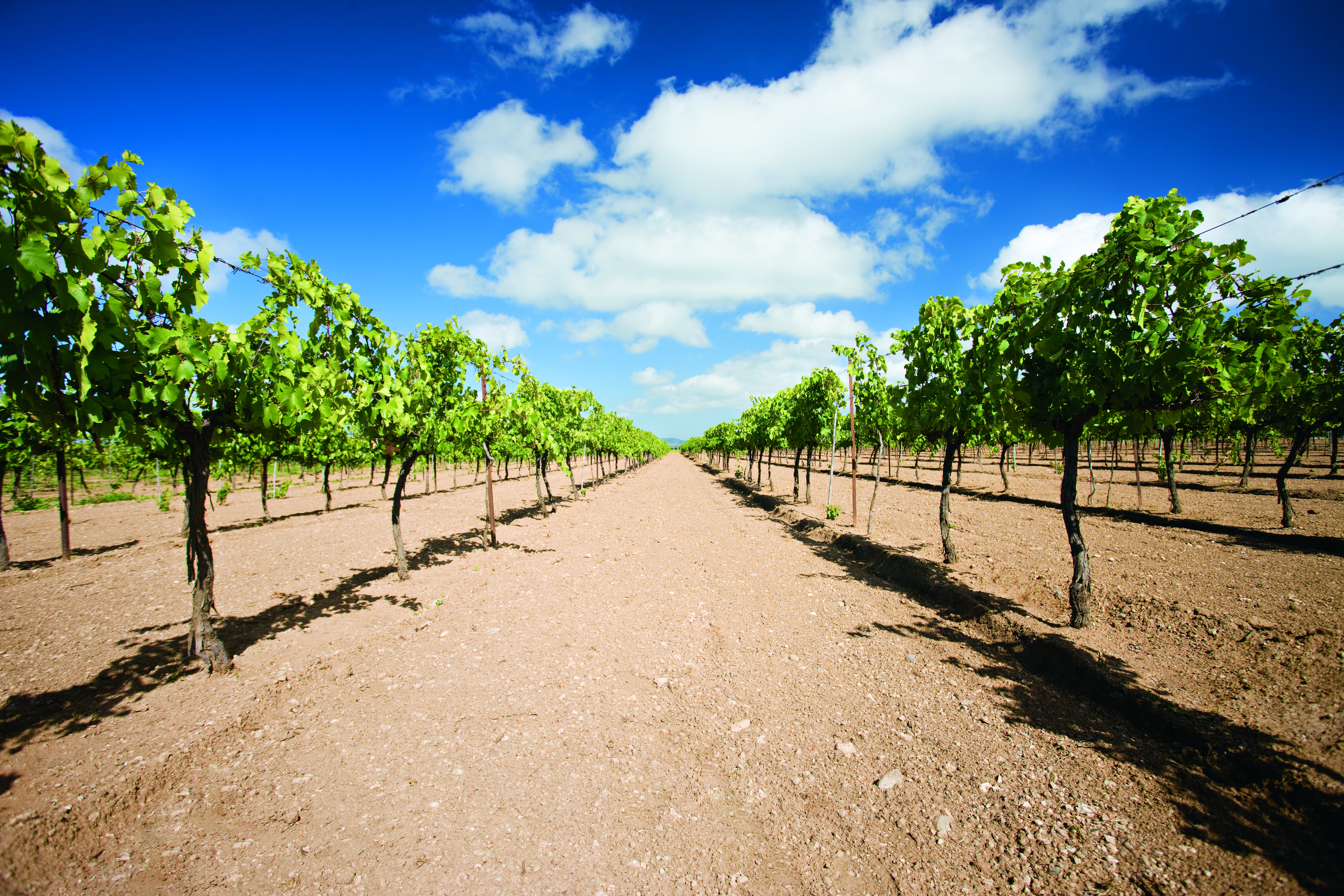
Vineyard in Ezequiel Montes, Querétaro

The Center region consists of areas in Querétaro, Zacatecas and Aguascalientes. Most vineyards are found at an altitude of 2,000 metres (6,500 ft), and most of the wine produced here is of the sparkling variety. However, other types such as Sauvignon blanc, Cabernet Sauvignon and Pinot noir can be found as well. The best-known vintner here is the Mexican operation of Spain’s Freixenet winery. This label is known for dry sparkling wines called “vinos espumosos” (sparkling wines), which come in satiny black bottles and based on Dom Pérignon’s champagne fermentation methods. Some still red wines are also produced. Another major producer is Companía Vinícola Los Eucaliptos in the town of Ezequiel Montes. A locally known label is Vinos Hidalgo La Madrileña in the San Juan del Río region. Los Azteca Hacienda Mexicana dates back to the 18th century which recently became a winery. Another vintner called La Ronda specializes in growing grapes to make Kosher wine sold in certain markets in Mexico City.

Most vineyards in Zacatecas are in the municipalities of Ojocaliente and Valle de la Macarena. This area has very cool winters and fairly cool summers, which combined with its moisture-holding clay soils is best for fast-maturing grapes with a high sugar content. A number of European red varieties such as cabernet sauvignon and merlot are grown here as well as American varieties such as zinfandel, Black Spanish and Lenoir. Some white grapes also do well here. Wineries here are smaller operations than in other parts of the country, with the best known local label being Casa Cachola just outside Valle de las Arcinas.

Vineyards in Sonora are typically in mountainous areas to offset the very hot climate. Viñedo Cuatro Sierras is located on Highway 2 going between the border town of Agua Prieta and Cananea, about 30 minutes by car from the U.S. border at Naco, Arizona. At about 1,500 meters of elevation and between four mountain ranges, its desert microclimate allows for the production of wine grapes. Cabernet Sauvignon, Touriga Nacional, Carmenère, Grenache, Chardonnay, and Verdejo are among the varieties grown there. Other producers in Sonora include Viñedo Cinco Encinos, Viñedos La Bonita, Giottonini, Viñedo Rancho Sonora, and La Cava de Ruby.

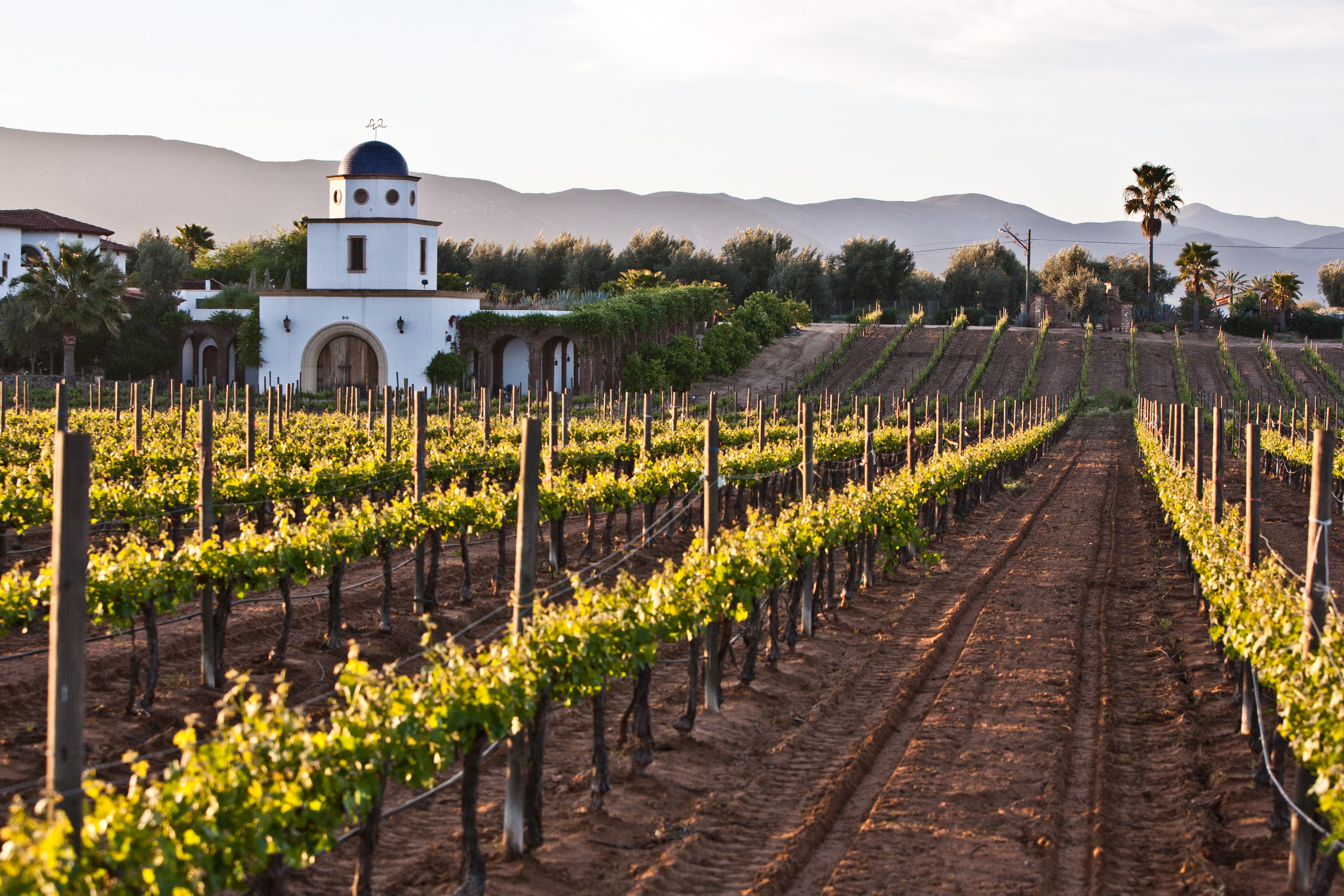
Vinyard in the Valle de Guadalupe of Baja California

The North zone produces ninety percent of Mexico’s wines today, with almost all of that coming from three regions not far from the port city of Ensenada: the San Antonio de las Minas zone, which includes the Valle de Guadalupe, the San Vicente Valley and the Santo Tomás Valley. This area is noted for its deep granite soils, warm sunny days, and nights cool due to breezes from the nearby Pacific Ocean. The area is ideal for both red and white wines, and one of the few locales in the world that can grow grapes for world-class wines. Grapes for Baja California wines are also grown in areas in neighboring Sonora state. The varieties of red wine produced in the Baja California region are Cabernet Sauvignon, Ruby Cabernet, Zinfandel, Grenache. and Mission. The white wines are Chenin Blanc, Palomino, Riesling, Sauvignon Blanc, Sémillon, Saint Emilion, and Malaga. There are three major wine producers in this area, Vinos L.A. Cetto in the Calafia Valley, Vinos Pedro Domecq and Bodegas de Santo Tomás in the Santo Tomás Valley. All have had wines that won international competitions including the Double Gold won by L.A. Cetto at the San Francisco International Wine Competition in May 2009. Many of these wines are now exported to Europe, the U.S. and Canada, and most wineries offer tours and wine tasting.

Most of Mexico’s wine innovation occurs in the Ensenada area, in the form of the so-called “boutique” producers such as Casa de Piedra, whose first vintage was produced in 1997. This operation only produces one white, called Piedra del Sol and a red called Vino de Piedra. Another small producer is Viña de Liceaga, which produces reds. Don Miller owns a ranch and winery called Casa Adobe Guadalupe with a wine school here to help small producers make a profit and draw tourists. There is even one organic wine producer by the name of Doña Lupe.

== Enotourism and festivals in Mexico ==
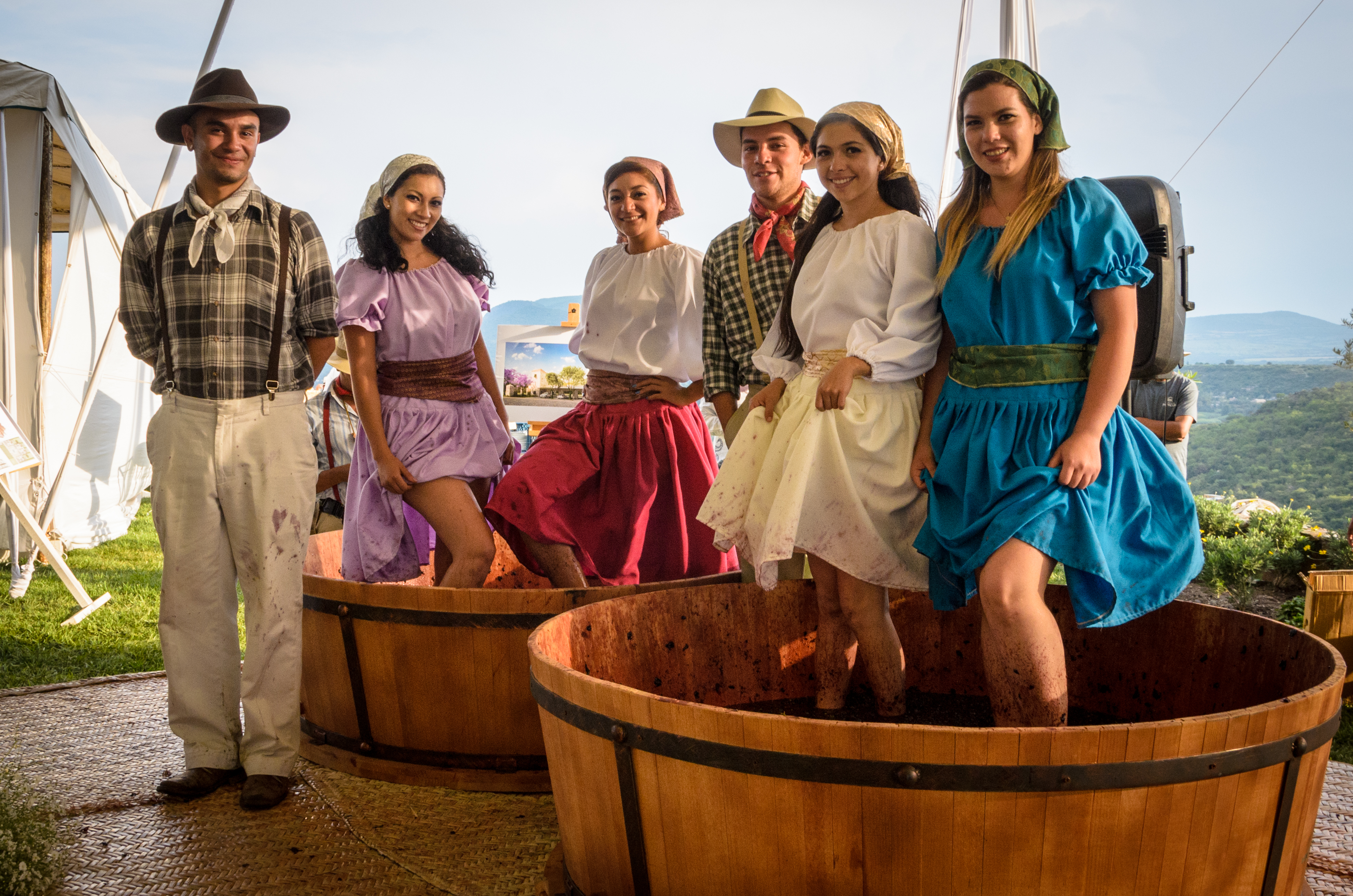
Harvest celebration at a vineyard in San Miguel de Allende, Guanajuato.

Enotourism in Mexico is centered on the Norte region, although wine festivals exist in the other wine-producing regions. The “Ruta del Vino” (Wine Route) connects the wine producing areas of the municipality of Ensenada, such as the Valley of Guadalupe, the Valley of Llano Colorado, Valley of Santo Tomás and the Valley of San Vicente with the port city of Ensenada and the border cities of Tijuana and Tecate. The Route connects over fifty wineries, along with upscale restaurants, hotels, museums and other attractions of this part of Baja California state. The route is marked by “Ruta del Vino” signs on the roads and highways to promote the area for enotourism, especially from the U.S. border.

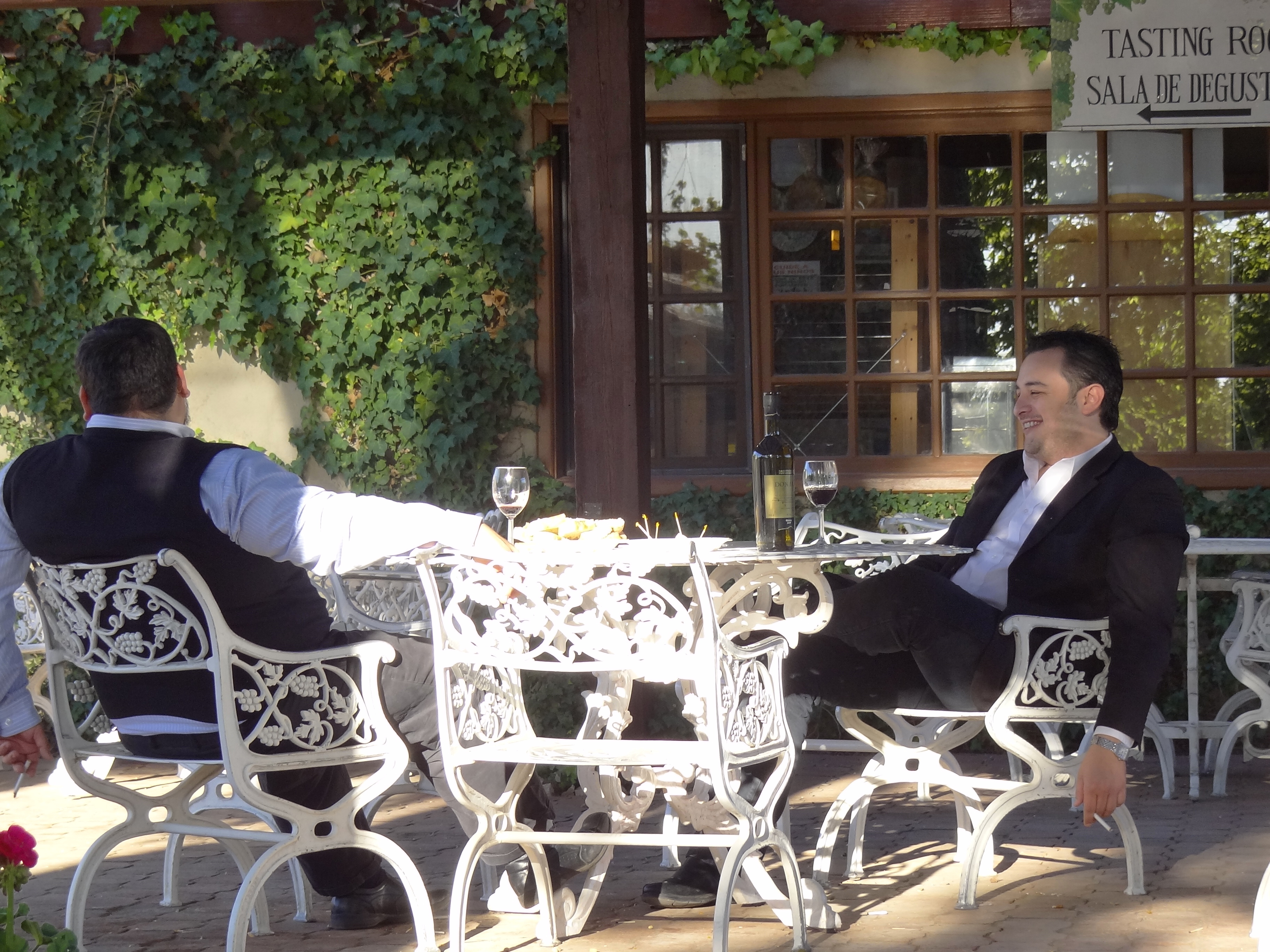
Wine tasting at a winery in Valle de Guadalupe

Another major tourism draw is the Fiesta de la Vendimia (Vintage Festival), which takes place in Ensenada and the Valley of Guadalupe every year in August. The festivals include wine tasting and contests, winery tours, fishing tournaments, cook-offs, gourmet food and concerts. These events are sponsored and/or organized by the area’s wineries. Since the event occurs in the summer, afternoon temperatures can hover around 38 °C (100 °F). Some of the events include “Noche de Cofradia en Ensenada”, which features wine and food tasting from about thirty wineries and restaurants, matching local wines with local culinary specialties. The annual Malagon Family Celebration is held on a 200-hectare (500-acre) ranch, vineyard with winery and bed and breakfast. This event includes a horse show, live music, food and wine. The Concurso Internacional Ensenada Tierra del Vino wine competition is also held in the city. Perhaps the most unusual event is at Bibayoff Winery with Russian music, dancers, food and wines.

However the drug war, which mostly takes place in border cities like Tijuana, has hurt this tourism to the area significantly as many U.S. tourists do not want to pass the border towns to get to the relatively calm wine valleys of Baja California.

The Parras Valley in Coahuila has held its Feria de la Uva y el Vino (Festival of Grapes and Wine) since 1945, centered on the town of Parras de la Fuente. The event showcases the area's wines as well as other local products such as handcrafts, candies, denim clothing and food. This event is generally held in June.

In the Center area, Tequisquiapan, Querétaro sponsors an annual cheese and wine festival called the Feria Nacional del Queso y de Vino in the month of June. This event draws local, national and international participants to compete for prizes and provide samples to visitors. This part of Querétaro is not only in wine country, but very near the center of where most Mexican cheeses were developed. Wines featured at this event are sparkling wines, but chardonnays, sauvignon blanc, merlots, pinot noirs and cabernets are also available for tasting. Wines from other parts of Mexico and the world also appear here. A more local celebration in the same area is Querétaro's version of the Vendimia first harvest festival which occurs at various wineries in the state in July. The most notable events occur at the Viñedos La Redonda Winery near Tequisquiapan with music, wine tasting and competitions, gourmet food and a handcrafts exposition.

Winefests in other parts of the country include the Cabo San Lucas Wine and Food Fest and the Guadalajara Winefest in November, as well as the GastroVino wine and food fest in Todos Santos, BCS in April.

== See also ==
- Baja California wine industry
- Agave wine
- Cheeses of Mexico
- Mexican beer
- Mexican cuisine
- Mezcal
- Pulque
- Tequila
- Winemaking
- Agriculture in Mexico
