= 5th federal electoral district of Coahuila =

Federal electoral district of Mexico

Coahuila's 5th
- Electoral district of the Chamber of Deputies of Mexico

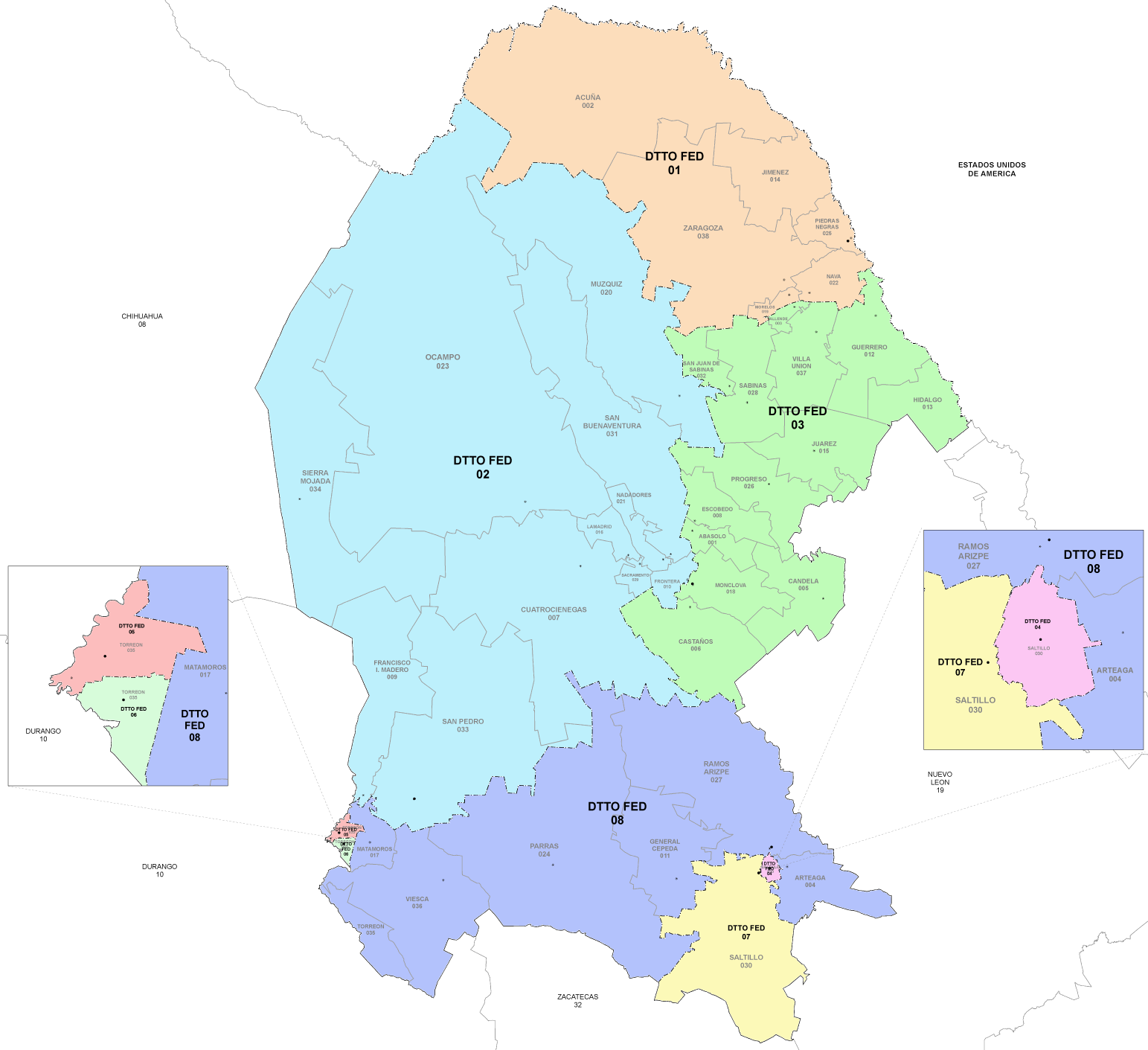
- 5th district since 2022

Incumbent
- Member: Guillermo Anaya Llamas
- Party: ▌National Action Party
- Congress: 66th (2024–2027)

District
- State: Coahuila
- Head town: Torreón
- Coordinates: 25°32′N 103°24′W
- Covers: Municipality of Torreón (part)
- PR region: Second
- Precincts: 205
- Population: 358,338 (2020 census)

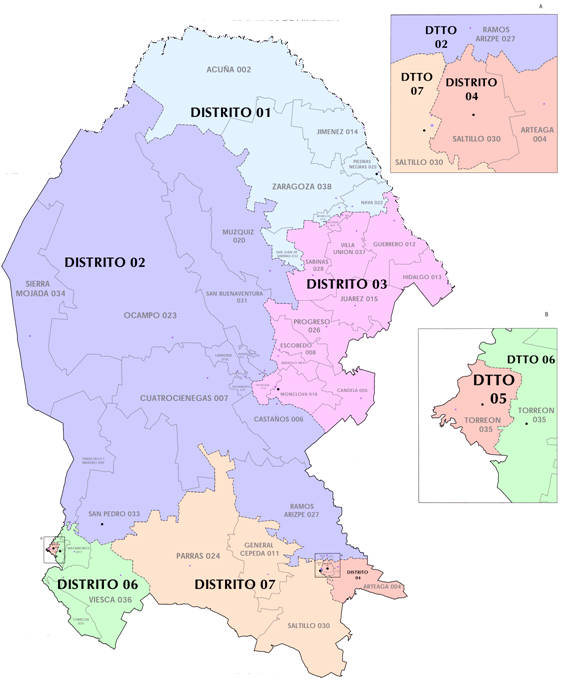
Coahuila under the 2017–2022 districting plan

The 5th federal electoral district of Coahuila (Spanish: Distrito electoral federal 05 de Coahuila) is one of the 300 electoral districts into which Mexico is divided for elections to the federal Chamber of Deputies and one of eight such districts in the state of Coahuila.

It elects one deputy to the lower house of Congress for each three-year legislative session by means of the first-past-the-post system. Votes cast in the district also count towards the calculation of proportional representation ("plurinominal") deputies elected from the second region.

Suspended in 1930, (Note: An amendment to Article 52 of the Constitution in 1928 changed the original provision of "one deputy per 60,000 inhabitants" to "one deputy per 100,000"; as a result, the size of the Chamber of Deputies fell from 281 in the 1928 election to 171 in 1934.) the 5th district was re-established as part of the 1977 political reforms and was first contested in the 1979 mid-term election. The current member for the district, elected in the 2024 general election, is José Guillermo Anaya Llamas of the National Action Party (PAN).

== District territory ==
In its 2023 districting plan, which is to be used for the 2024, 2027 and 2030 federal elections, the National Electoral Institute (INE) assigned Coahuila an additional district. The reconfigured 5th district comprises 205 electoral precincts (secciones electorales) in the main portion of the municipality of Torreón. (Note: The 6th district covers the remainder of the municipality.)

The head town (cabecera distrital), where results from individual polling stations are gathered together and tallied, is the city of Torreón. The district reported a population of 358,338 in the 2020 census.

== Previous districting schemes ==
Evolution of electoral district numbers
	1974	1978	1996	2005	2017	2023
Coahuila	4	7	7	7	7	8
Chamber of Deputies	196	300				

2017–2022

Between 2017 and 2022, the district covered 276 precincts in the municipality of Torreón, with the remainder of the municipality assigned to the 6th district. The head town was at Torreón.

2005–2017

Under the 2005 districting scheme, the district covered the municipalities of Matamoros, Parras, Viesca and 142 precincts in the southern half of the municipality of Torreón. The head town was the city of Torreón.

1996–2005

Under the 1996 scheme, the district covered the north and east of the city of Torreón, the north, east and south of the surrounding municipality, and the whole of the municipalities of Matamoros and Viesca.

1978–1996

The districting scheme in force from 1978 to 1996 was the result of the 1977 electoral reforms, which increased the number of single-member seats in the Chamber of Deputies from 196 to 300. Under that plan, Coahuila's seat allocation rose from 4 to 7. The 5th district had its head town at Frontera and it comprised the municipalities of Arteaga, Castaños, Frontera, General Cepeda, Parras, Ramos Arizpe and the rural portion of the municipality of Saltillo.

== Deputies returned to Congress ==
(Mexico) National parties
- Current
- PAN
- PRI
- PT
- PVEM
- MC
- Morena
- PAZ
- Somos
- Defunct or local only
- PLM
- PNR
- PRM
- PNM
- PP
- PPS
- PARM
- PFCRN
- CON
- PANAL
- PSD
- PES
- PES
- PRD

Coahuila's 5th district
Election	Deputy	Party	Term	Legislature
1916	Manuel Cepeda Medrano		1916–1917	Constituent Congress of Querétaro
1917	Jacinto B. Treviño	PLC	1917–1918	27th Congress
1918|	Francisco L. Treviño		1918–1920	28th Congress
1920	Andrés Gutiérrez Castro	Laborist Party (Mexico)	1920–1922	29th Congress
1922	Carlos Garza Castro		1922–1924	30th Congress
1924	Antonio Garza Castro	Laborist Party (Mexico)	1924–1926	31st Congress
1926	Antonio Garza Castro	Laborist Party (Mexico)	1926–1928	32nd Congress
1928	Antonio Garza Castro	Laborist Party (Mexico)	1928–1930	33rd Congress
The 5th district was suspended from 1930 to 1979
1979	Conrado Martínez Ortiz	Institutional Revolutionary Party	1979–1982	51st Congress
1982	Óscar Ramírez Mijares	Institutional Revolutionary Party	1982–1985	52nd Congress
1985	Gaspar Valdés Valdés	Institutional Revolutionary Party	1985–1988	53rd Congress
1988	Ignacio Dávila Sánchez	Institutional Revolutionary Party	1988–1991	54th Congress
1991	Gaspar Valdez Valdez	Institutional Revolutionary Party	1991–1994	55th Congress
1994	Gerardo Ordaz Moreno	Institutional Revolutionary Party	1994–1997	56th Congress
1997	Braulio Manuel Fernández Aguirre	Institutional Revolutionary Party	1997–2000	57th Congress
2000	Néstor Villarreal Castro	National Action Party (Mexico)	2000–2003	58th Congress
2003	Eduardo Olmos Castro	Institutional Revolutionary Party	2003–2006	59th Congress
2006	Carlos Augusto Bracho González	National Action Party (Mexico)	2006–2009	60th Congress
2009	Miguel Ángel Riquelme Solís	Institutional Revolutionary Party	2009–2012	61st Congress
2012	Salomón Juan Marcos Issa	Institutional Revolutionary Party	2012–2015	62nd Congress
2015	Flor Estela Rentería Medina	Institutional Revolutionary Party	2015–2018	63rd Congress
2018	Luis Fernando Salazar Fernández (Note: Salazar Fernández originally sat with the PAN after being elected for the Por México al Frente coalition. He switched from the PAN to Morena on 17 October 2018.)	National Action Party (Mexico) National Regeneration Movement	2018–2021	64th Congress
2021	José Antonio Gutiérrez Jardón	Institutional Revolutionary Party	2021–2024	65th Congress
2024	José Guillermo Anaya Llamas	National Action Party (Mexico)	2024–2027	66th Congress

== Presidential elections ==
Coahuila's 5th district
Election	District won by	Party or coalition	%
2018	Andrés Manuel López Obrador	Juntos Haremos Historia	42.0509
2024	Claudia Sheinbaum Pardo	Sigamos Haciendo Historia	50.0046
