= Antonio Juan Marcos Villarreal =

Mexican politician and businessman

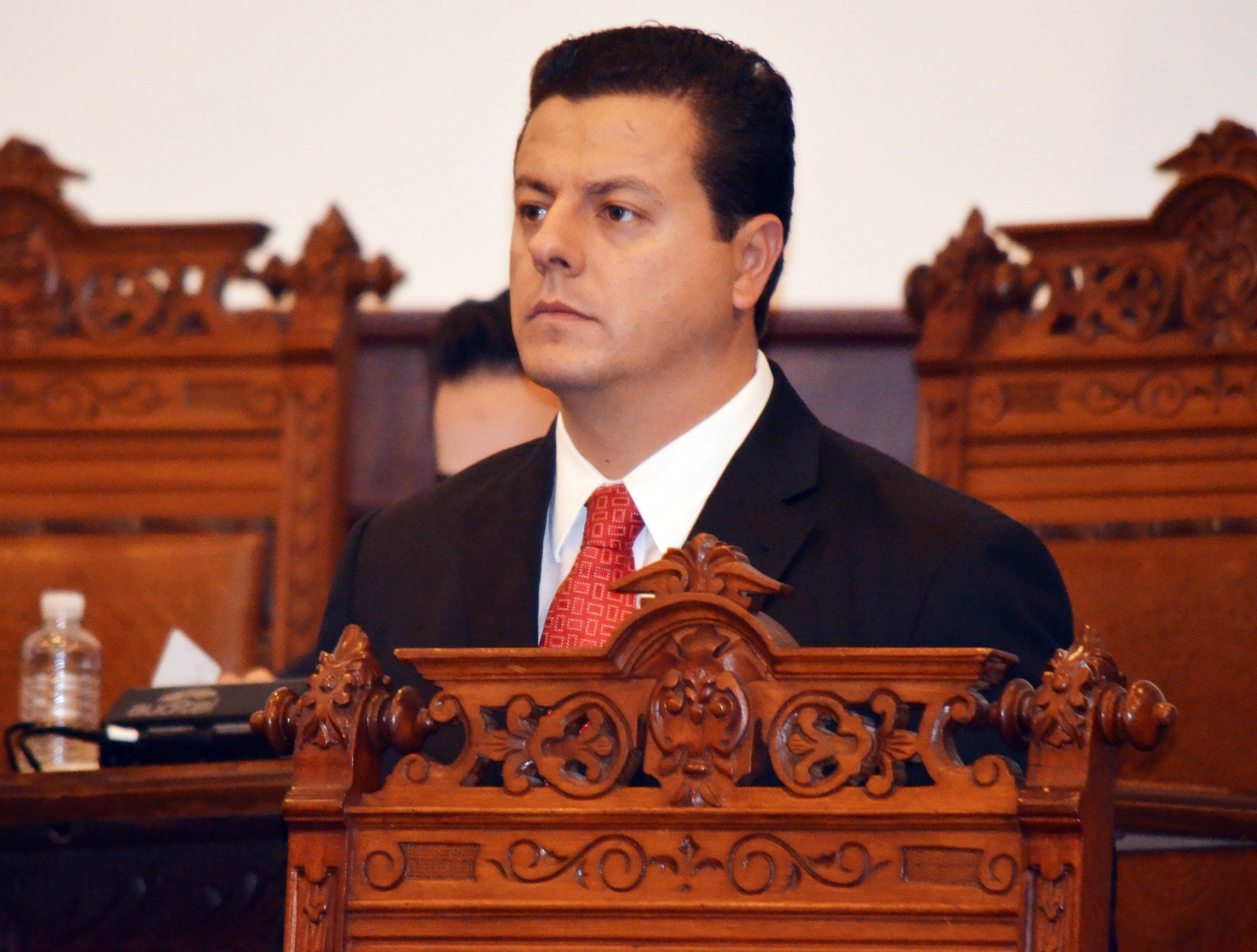

Personal details
- Born: May 12, 1976 (age 49) Torreón, Coahuila
- Occupation: Politician, businessperson

Antonio Juan Marcos Villarreal (born May 12, 1976) is a Mexican politician and businessman, member of the Institutional Revolutionary Party and Coahuila's congressman.

== Biography ==
Born in Torreón, Coahuila, Antonio Juan Marcos Villarreal is the son of the politician and congressman Salomón Juan Marcos Issa and Rocío Villarreal Asunsolo. His family is one of the most important in the textile industry of Torreón, Coahuila. He earned a bachelor's degree in Business Management at the Instituto Tecnológico de Estudios Superiores de Monterrey in 1999. He has been affiliated with the Institutional Revolutionary Party since he was 18 years old.

He was president of the National Chamber of Cloth Industry in the Laguna delegation and president of the Consejo Lagunero de la Iniciativa Privada and other non-profit organizations.

He was an advisor in the National Commission of Mexican Transportation and in the non-profit association "Fíjate en La Laguna".

== Politics ==
In his career as a politician, he was a deputy in State Congress of Coahuila during 2005. In 2009, he served as Director of Non-Centralized Organisms and the Secretary of Regional Development of La Laguna. In 2011, he was elected representative of the VII Local District of Coahuila, becoming a member of the LIX Legislatura of this state.

== See also ==
- Antonio Juan Marcos Issa
- Salomon Juan Marcos Issa
