= 6th federal electoral district of Coahuila =

Federal electoral district of Mexico

Coahuila's 6th
- Electoral district of the Chamber of Deputies of Mexico

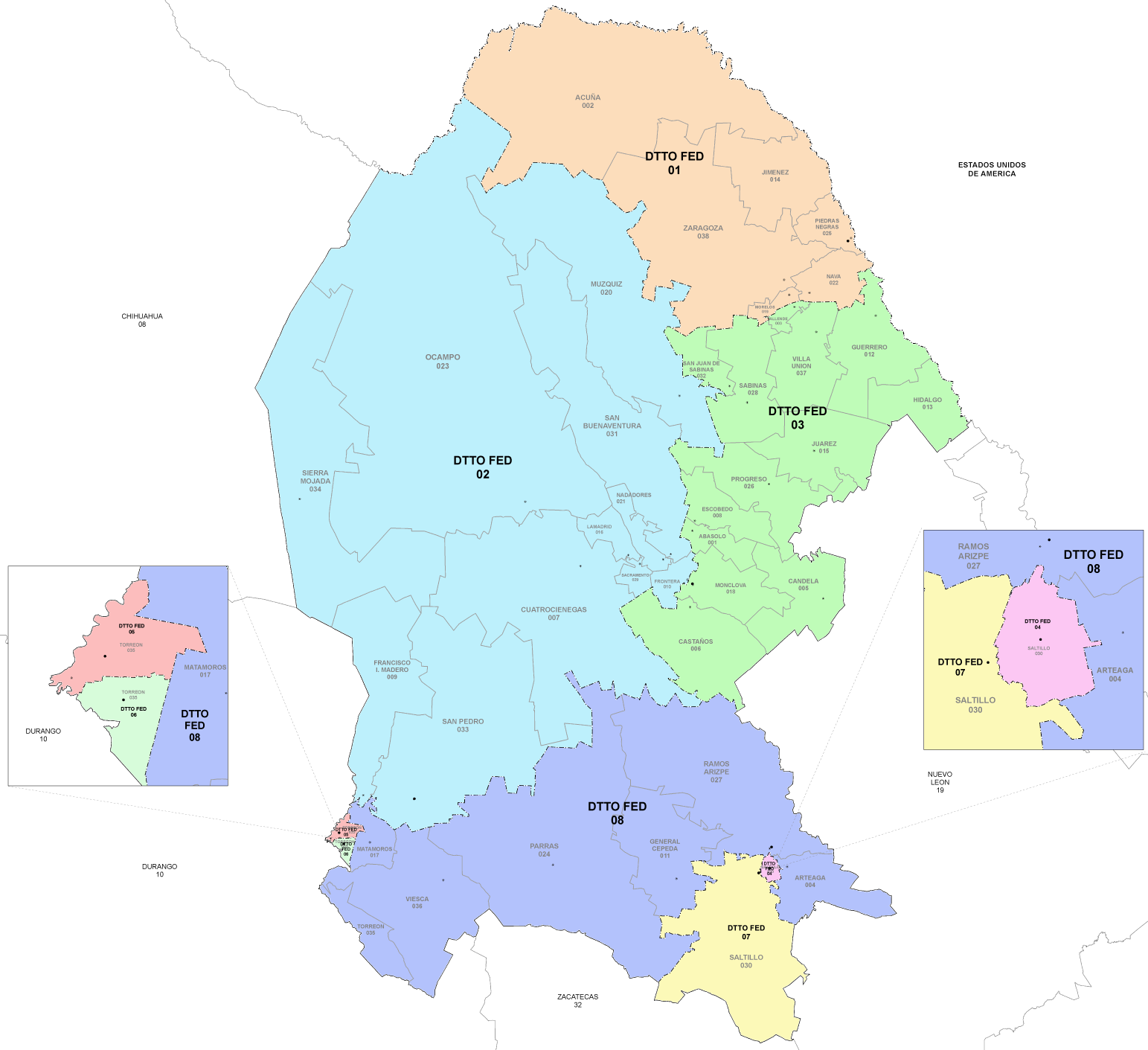
- 6th district since 2022

Incumbent
- Member: Cintia Cuevas Sánchez
- Party: ▌Morena
- Congress: 66th (2024–2027)

District
- State: Coahuila
- Head town: Torreón
- Coordinates: 25°32′N 103°24′W
- Covers: Municipality of Torreón (part)
- PR region: Second
- Precincts: 190
- Population: 358,152 (2020 census)

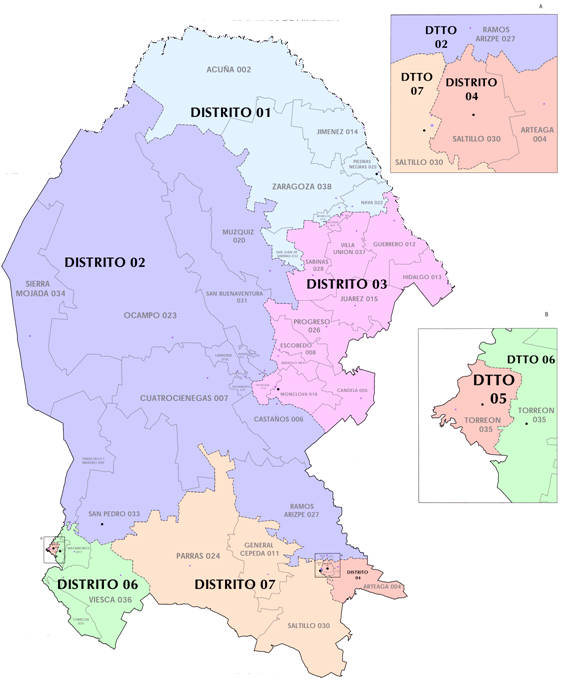
Coahuila under the 2017–2022 districting plan

The 6th federal electoral district of Coahuila (Spanish: Distrito electoral federal 06 de Coahuila) is one of the 300 electoral districts into which Mexico is divided for elections to the federal Chamber of Deputies and one of eight such districts in the state of Coahuila.

It elects one deputy to the lower house of Congress for each three-year legislative session by means of the first-past-the-post system. Votes cast in the district also count towards the calculation of proportional representation ("plurinominal") deputies elected from the second region.

Suspended in 1930, (Note: An amendment to Article 52 of the Constitution in 1928 changed the original provision of "one deputy per 60,000 inhabitants" to "one deputy per 100,000"; as a result, the size of the Chamber of Deputies fell from 281 in the 1928 election to 171 in 1934.) the 6th district was re-established as part of the 1977 political reforms and was first contested in the 1979 mid-term election. The restored district elected its first deputy in the 1979 mid-terms.

The current member for the district, elected in the 2024 general election, is Cintia Cuevas Sánchez of the National Regeneration Movement (Morena).

== District territory ==
In its 2023 districting plan, which is to be used for the 2024, 2027 and 2030 federal elections, the National Electoral Institute (INE) assigned Coahuila an additional district. The reconfigured 6th district covers 190 electoral precincts (secciones electorales) in the northern portion of the municipality of Torreón. (Note: The 5th district covers the remainder of the municipality.)

The head town (cabecera distrital), where results from individual polling stations are gathered together and tallied, is the city of Torreón. The district reported a population of 358,152 in the 2020 census.

== Previous districting schemes ==
Evolution of electoral district numbers
	1974	1978	1996	2005	2017	2023
Coahuila	4	7	7	7	7	8
Chamber of Deputies	196	300				

2017–2022

Between 2017 and 2022, the district covered 161 precincts in the municipality of Torreón, with the remainder of the municipality assigned to the 5th district. The head town was at Torreon.

2005–2017

Under the 2005 districting scheme, the 6th district covered 161 precincts in the northern half of the municipality of Torreón. The city of Torreón was the head town.

1996–2005

Under the 1996 scheme, the district covered the western portion of the city of Torreón.

1978–1996

The districting scheme in force from 1978 to 1996 was the result of the 1977 electoral reforms, which increased the number of single-member seats in the Chamber of Deputies from 196 to 300. Under that plan, Coahuila's seat allocation rose from 4 to 7. The 6th district had its head town at Torreón and it covered a part of the city and the rural portion of its municipality.

== Deputies returned to Congress ==
(Mexico) National parties
- Current
- PAN
- PRI
- PT
- PVEM
- MC
- Morena
- PAZ
- Somos
- Defunct or local only
- PLM
- PNR
- PRM
- PNM
- PP
- PPS
- PARM
- PFCRN
- CON
- PANAL
- PSD
- PES
- PES
- PRD

Coahuila's 6th district
Election	Deputy	Party	Term	Legislature
1922	Jacobo Cárdenas	Laborist Party (Mexico)	1922–1924	30th Congress
1924	Marcos A. Hernández	Laborist Party (Mexico)	1924–1926	31st Congress
1926	Domingo P. Acosta	Laborist Party (Mexico)	1926–1928	32nd Congress
1928	Raymundo Cervera	Laborist Party (Mexico)	1928–1930	33rd Congress
The 6th district was suspended from 1930 to 1979
1979	Francisco José Madero González	Institutional Revolutionary Party	1979–1982	51st Congress
1982	Enrique Agüero Ávalos	Institutional Revolutionary Party	1982–1985	52nd Congress
1985	Heriberto Ramos Salas	Institutional Revolutionary Party	1985–1988	53rd Congress
1988	Humberto Roque Villanueva	Institutional Revolutionary Party	1988–1991	54th Congress
1991	Mariano López Mercado (Note: López Mercado took leave of his seat to contend for and serve as the municipal president of Torreón (1994–1996).); Irma Mayela Adame Aguayo	Institutional Revolutionary Party	1991–1993; 1993–1994	55th Congress
1994	Jesús Salvador Hernández Vélez	Institutional Revolutionary Party	1994–1997	56th Congress
1997	Alberto González Domene	National Action Party (Mexico)	1997–2000	57th Congress
2000	Guillermo Anaya Llamas; Silvestre Enrique Faya Viesca	National Action Party (Mexico)	2000–2002; 2002–2003	58th Congress
2003	Vacant (Note: The Federal Electoral Court annulled the 6 July election in the 6th district and a special election was held.); Laura Reyes Retana Ramos (Note: Retana Ramos left the PRI group in Congress in February 2006 to sit as an independent.)	Institutional Revolutionary Party Independent politician	2003–2004; 2004–2006	59th Congress
2006	Jesús de León Tello (Note: De León Tello took leave of his seat on 9 August 2009 to contend for the municipal presidency of Torreón.); Florentina Medrano Echeverría	National Action Party (Mexico)	2006–2009; 2009	60th Congress
2009	Héctor Fernández Aguirre	Institutional Revolutionary Party	2009–2012	61st Congress
2012	Marcelo Torres Cofiño	National Action Party (Mexico)	2012–2015	62nd Congress
2015	José Refugio Sandoval Rodríguez		2015–2018	63rd Congress
2018	José Ángel Pérez Hernández (Note: Pérez Hernández switched allegiance from the Social Encounter Party to the Labour Party in August 2020.)	Social Encounter Party Labour Party (Mexico)	2018–2021	64th Congress
2021	Shamir Fernández Hernández	Institutional Revolutionary Party	2021–2024	65th Congress
2024	Cintia Cuevas Sánchez	National Regeneration Movement	2024–2027	66th Congress

== Presidential elections ==
Coahuila's 6th district
Election	District won by	Party or coalition	%
2018	Andrés Manuel López Obrador	Juntos Haremos Historia	49.5217
2024	Claudia Sheinbaum Pardo	Sigamos Haciendo Historia	52.7248
