= Autonomous University of Coahuila =

Coordinates: 26.9457°N 101.4165°W

- Universidad Autónoma de Coahuila
- Motto: En el bien, fincamos el saber
- Motto in English: In the good, we establish knowledge
- Type: Public university
- Established: 1957
- Students: 30,269
- Location: Coahuila, Mexico

The Autonomous University of Coahuila (Universidad Autónoma de Coahuila) is a state university founded in 1957. It is located in the northern Mexican state of Coahuila. The university system has three campuses — Saltillo, Torreón, and Norte — distributed among the most populated cities in the state. It is perhaps the only one university in the world which is governed by a President elected for a period of 3 years by direct general balloting by the unqualified vote of both students and teachers.

== Campuses ==
The university's administrative headquarters are located on the Saltillo campus. The city's reputation for learning dates back to Colonial times and this tradition continues to be true today. Saltillo, the state capital, is only a 50-minute drive from the metropolitan city of Monterrey. Although highly industrialized, Saltillo offers a variety of cultural attractions, such as the Plaza de Armas, the Government Palace, the Cathedral de Santiago, and several interesting museums.

Another of the campuses is located in the city of Torreón. The area is hot and dry and includes the nearby desert oasis called Dunas de Viesca and Parras de la Fuente. Torreón is well known for its cotton crop and milk production.

The Campus Norte is situated mainly in the city of Monclova. The region is one of the main domestic producers of coal. Nearby attractions include Xochipoli Park, the Don Martin Dam and the Bisagra Turtle Reserve.

The Piedras Negras Campus is located near the government palace and the city's main square, the "Macro Plaza".

The university also has an inter-institutional agreement with the Universidad Mexico Americana del Norte in Reynosa, Tamaulipas to offer its Doctor of Business Administration degree at the border city.

== Majors ==
Undergraduate

- Accounting
- Architecture
- Art
- Biochemistry
- Biology
- Business Administration
- Chemistry
- Civil
- Communications and Electronics
- Computer Administration
- Computer Engineering
- Economics
- Education
- Electrical
- Finances
- Fiscal Administration
- Graphic Design
- Health Sciences
- History
- Human Relations
- Human Resources
- Industrial
- Law
- Marketing
- Math
- Mechanical
- Merchandising
- Metallurgy and Materials
- Mineral and Energy Resources
- Music
- Musical Education
- Physics
- Political Sciences and Public Administration
- Production
- Psychology
- Social Work
- Sociology
- Software
- Spanish Literature

Graduate

- Anesthesiology
- Biocatalysts
- Biotechnology
- Chemistry Science and Technology
- Clinical Pharmacology
- Construction
- Corporate Health, Safety and Ecology
- Dentistry
- Electronics
- Emergencies
- Enzymes
- Family Medicine
- Finances
- Fiscal Administration
- Food Science and Technology
- General Surgery
- Geriatrics
- Global Business
- Gynecology and Obstetrics
- Health Research
- Human Capital
- Information Technology
- Integral Medicine
- Internal Medicine
- Law
- Marketing
- Math Education
- Mechanical
- Ophthalmology
- Pediatrics
- Planning (Economics/Architecture)
- Projects Administration (Architecture)
- Projects Formulation and Evaluation
- Radiology
- Radiology
- Real Estate Valuation
- Regional Development
- Research
- Social Development
- Taxes
- Trauma
- Upper Level Corporate Management
- Water Management
- Work Medicine

== Students & Facilities ==
- Total Enrollment: 30,269
- Undergraduates: 29,157
- Graduates: 1,112
- Total Faculty: 2,270
- Full-time Faculty: 588
- Library Facilities: 55
- Library Volumes: 374,429
- Cafeterias:
- Student Computing Centers: 45
- Average Students/Computer:
- Photocopy Facilities: 30
- Campus Bookstores: 31

== Extracurricular activities ==
- Folkloric dance
- Guided tours
- Intercollegiate sports
- Music
- Musical groups
- Radio/television
- Small business groups
- Social service groups
- Social services
- Student government/student council
- Student newspaper
- Travel groups

== Campus ==
In order to meet the demand for higher education in the state of Coahuila, UAdeC has three campuses located throughout the state. The campus in Saltillo comprises 24 schools, the Torreón campus has 17 schools and the Campus Norte in Monclova has 10 schools.

Students have access to computers connected to the Internet and all the university centers have cafeterias, a library and sports facilities.

== Notable alumni ==
- Jaime Martínez Veloz
- Rubén Moreira Valdez
- Laura Reyes Retana
