= Miguel Ángel Riquelme Solís =

Governor of Coahuila (born 1970)

Miguel Ángel Riquelme
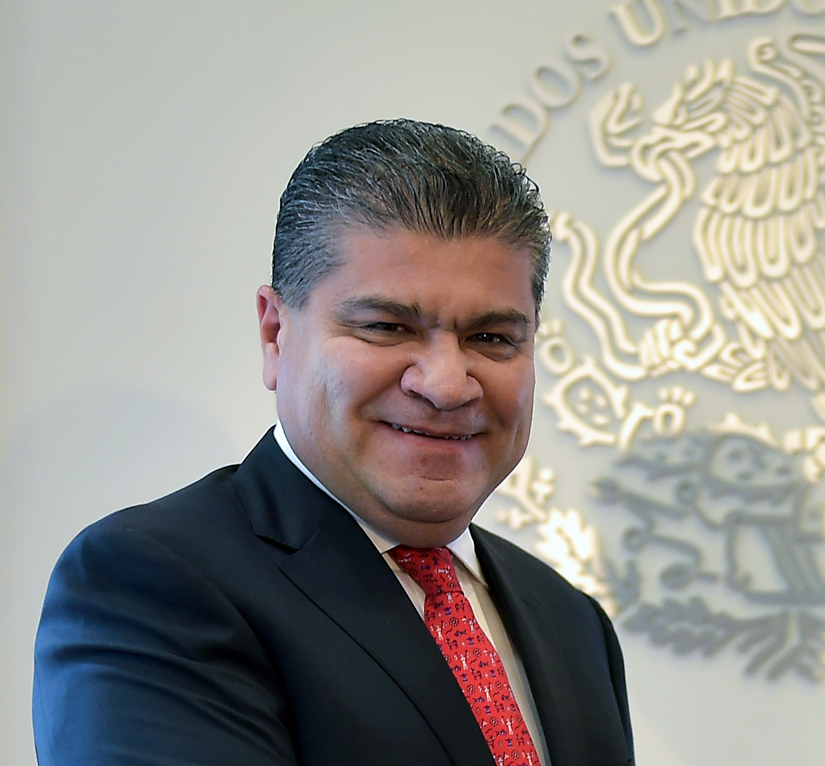

Governor of Coahuila
- In office 1 December 2017 – 30 November 2023
- Preceded by: Rubén Moreira Valdez
- Succeeded by: Manolo Jiménez Salinas

Member of the Chamber of Deputies for Coahuila's 5th district
- In office 1 September 2009 – 31 August 2012
- Preceded by: Carlos Augusto Bracho
- Succeeded by: Salomon Juan Marcos Issa

Personal details
- Born: 18 September 1970 (age 55) Torreón, Coahuila, Mexico
- Party: Institutional Revolutionary Party (PRI)

Miguel Ángel Riquelme Solís (born 18 September 1970) is a Mexican politician from the Institutional Revolutionary Party (PRI). He served as governor of Coahuila from 2017 to 2023.

== Early life and career ==
Riquelme Solís was born in Torreón, Coahuila, on 18 September 1970. He attended the Instituto Tecnológico de La Laguna, where he studied computer engineering and was the president of the student body between 1991 and 1993. He became a tax collector in the nearby town of Matamoros, Coahuila, in 1994, bouncing between the tax collection offices of Matamoros and Torreón. He also joined the PRI, working on the campaign staff of a candidate for state deputy in 1996 and coordinating political operatives for a federal deputy campaign in 1997. In 1999, he ran for state deputy from a district in Torreón.

In 2000, Riquelme joined the state government, overseeing social welfare programs in the Laguna region for most of the government of Enrique Martínez y Martínez. After a brief stint in the Coahuila state legislature between 2005 and 2007, he headed up social welfare efforts in the state secretariat of regional development and then was named the head of the Laguna office of that agency.

In 2009, voters in Coahuila's fifth district elected Riquelme as their deputy to the 61st Congress. He held four commission assignments, including a secretary post on the Metropolitan Development Commission.

On 10 February 2011, Riquelme took permanent leave from the Chamber of Deputies. When Rubén Moreira Valdez's government came into power, Riquelme was named the state secretary of government. Three years later, in 2014, Riquelme was elected the municipal president of Torreón; during this time, he was criticized for throwing a birthday party for nearly 1,500 people that cost one million pesos. Among the large projects taken up by the municipal government during his term was a cable car to the Cristo de las Noas statue; the project cost 170 million pesos and was not finished until December 2017 due to numerous delays; Riquelme dedicated the project as the governor.

=== 2017 gubernatorial campaign ===
In December 2016, during the reading of his third government address as mayor, Riquelme announced he would step aside as mayor in order to compete for the PRI gubernatorial nomination. In the internal PRI election, he earned 90 percent of the vote to secure the nomination.

The gubernatorial campaign was closely contested and narrowly won by Riquelme by a margin of 2.5 percentage points over National Action Party candidate Guillermo Anaya Llamas. Riquelme's win was challenged due to allegations that the campaign exceeded its spending limits; the case was not finally resolved by the Federal Electoral Tribunal in Riquelme's favor until 24 November, just a week before the new governor was to take office.

== Post-gubernatorial career ==
Riquelme Solís won election as one of Coahuila's senators in the 2024 Senate election, occupying the first place on the Fuerza y Corazón por México coalition's two-name formula.

== Personal life ==
In 1992, Riquelme married Blanca Marcela, with whom he has two daughters.
