= Jesús de León Tello =

Mexican politician

- Born: 20 May 1974 (age 52); Torreón, Coahuila, Mexico
- Occupation: Politician
- Political party: PAN

Jesús de León Tello (born 20 May 1974) is a Mexican politician affiliated with the National Action Party (PAN). In the 2006 general election he was elected to the Chamber of Deputies for the 60th session of Congress, representing Coahuila's sixth district.
