= Vinos de la Región Vitivinícola de Querétaro =

Vinos de la Región Vitivinícola de Querétaro is the geographical indication (Indicación Geográfica Protegida - IGP) that recognizes and protects the wine produced in the region of Querétaro in Mexico (Querétaro IGP). The label was created in March 2025 by the Mexican Institute of Industrial Property, and marked the first time an IGP was attributed to a wine region in Mexico.

The State of Querétaro grows grapes on 600 hectares, producing 300 different wine labels. The main cities producing wine in the IGP region are:

- Tequisquiapan
- El Marqués
- Ezequiel Montes
- San Juan del Río
- Colón
- Huimilpan
- Cadereyta de Montes
- Pedro Escobedo

== See also ==
- Mexican wine
- New World wine
