= Guillermo Anaya Llamas =

Mexican politician (born 1968)

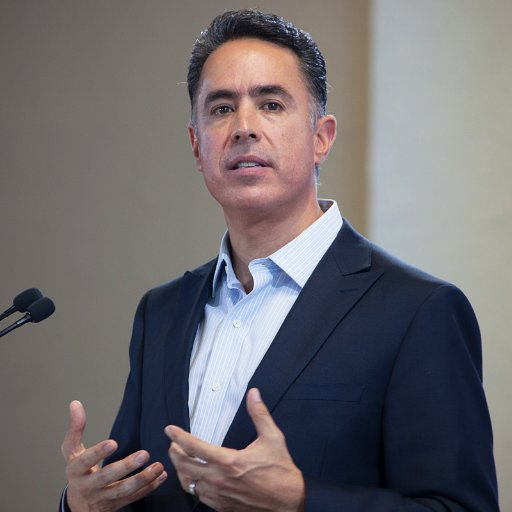
- Born: José Guillermo Anaya Llamas; 2 July 1968 (age 58); Torreón, Coahuila, Mexico
- Occupation: Politician
- Political party: National Action Party

José Guillermo Anaya Llamas (Note: In this Spanish name, the first or paternal surname is Anaya and the second or maternal family name is Llamas.) (born 2 July 1968) is a Mexican politician affiliated with the National Action Party (PAN). He has served as the municipal president of his home town, Torreón, Coahuila, and has been elected to both chambers of the Congress of the Union

== Biography ==
Guillermo Anaya Llamas has a law degree and a master's degree in Corporate Law, both from Universidad Iberoamericana Torreón.

He was a deputy in the Congress of Coahuila from 1997 to 1999, where he was coordinator of the PAN bench; a federal deputy of during the 58th Congress from 2000 to 2002, representing the sixth district of Coahuila; and municipal president of Torreón from 2003 to 2005. He was the coordinator of Felipe Calderón's 2006 presidential campaign in the state of Coahuila. In September 2006 his daughter was sponsored by Felipe Calderón and Margarita Zavala in Torreón; at that time Guillermo Anaya's sister was the wife of Sergio Villareal el Grande's brother, who attended the meeting and recommended Calderón appoint Genaro García Luna as head of security. In the 2006 general election Anaya was elected to the Senate for Coahuila.

On 15 October 2007, Governor of Coahuila Humberto Moreira, who is currently facing harsh criticism for the illicit debt of the state of Coahuila, accused him, together with Senator Ernesto Saro Boardman and the national president of the PAN, Manuel Espino, of having links with drug trafficking, which was denied by the senator who demanded Moreira to prove it or retract it, otherwise he would proceed to take legal action. The weekly Proceso published a column allegedly confirming Senator Anaya's family ties with one of the main lieutenants of the Gulf Cartel. However, a defamation lawsuit was filed against the author of said article, which resulted in a ruling in favor of Guillermo Anaya in which the accusations were proven to be false.

On 9 December 2007, the national president of the PAN, Germán Martínez Cázares, proposed him for the position of general secretary of the PAN; he ceased in the same, by instruction of the same Martínez Cázares on 10 June 2008 and became vice-coordinator of the PAN bench in the Senate of the Republic, he was replaced in the general secretariat by Deputy Rogelio Carbajal Tejada after ratification by the National Executive Committee.

In 2011 he was the candidate for governor for the parties Acción Nacional and Unidad Democrática de Coahuila, in the electoral process to renew the governorship of Coahuila in the elections of that year. He lost to Rubén Moreira Valdez, brother of the then governor on leave of absence Humberto Moreira.

He was a plurinominal deputy from 2012 to 2015 in the 62nd Congress, in which he was a member of the Civil Protection and National Defense Commissions, as well as Chairman of the Public Safety Commission. In 2016 he was elected candidate for Governor of Coahuila for the second time, being nominated by the Coalition "Alianza Ciudadana por Coahuila", formed by the parties Acción Nacional, Unidad Democrática de Coahuila, Primero Coahuila and Encuentro Social towards the Coahuila State Elections of 2017. He lost to Miguel Ángel Riquelme. He sought to annul the election with the slogan "Coahula digno".

In 2017, details were disseminated about an account of Guillermo Anaya, in a bank in the tax haven of Barbados.

In the 2024 general election, Anaya Llamas was elected to the Chamber of Deputies for Coahuila's 5th district.
