= Néstor Villarreal Castro =

Mexican politician

- Born: 24 August 1953 (age 72); Torreón, Coahuila, Mexico
- Occupation: Politician
- Political party: PAN

Néstor Villarreal Castro (born 24 August 1953) is a Mexican politician from the National Action Party (PAN). From 2000 to 2003 he served as a federal deputy in the 58th session of Congress, representing Coahuila's fifth district.
