= Luis Fernando Salazar Fernández =

Mexican politician

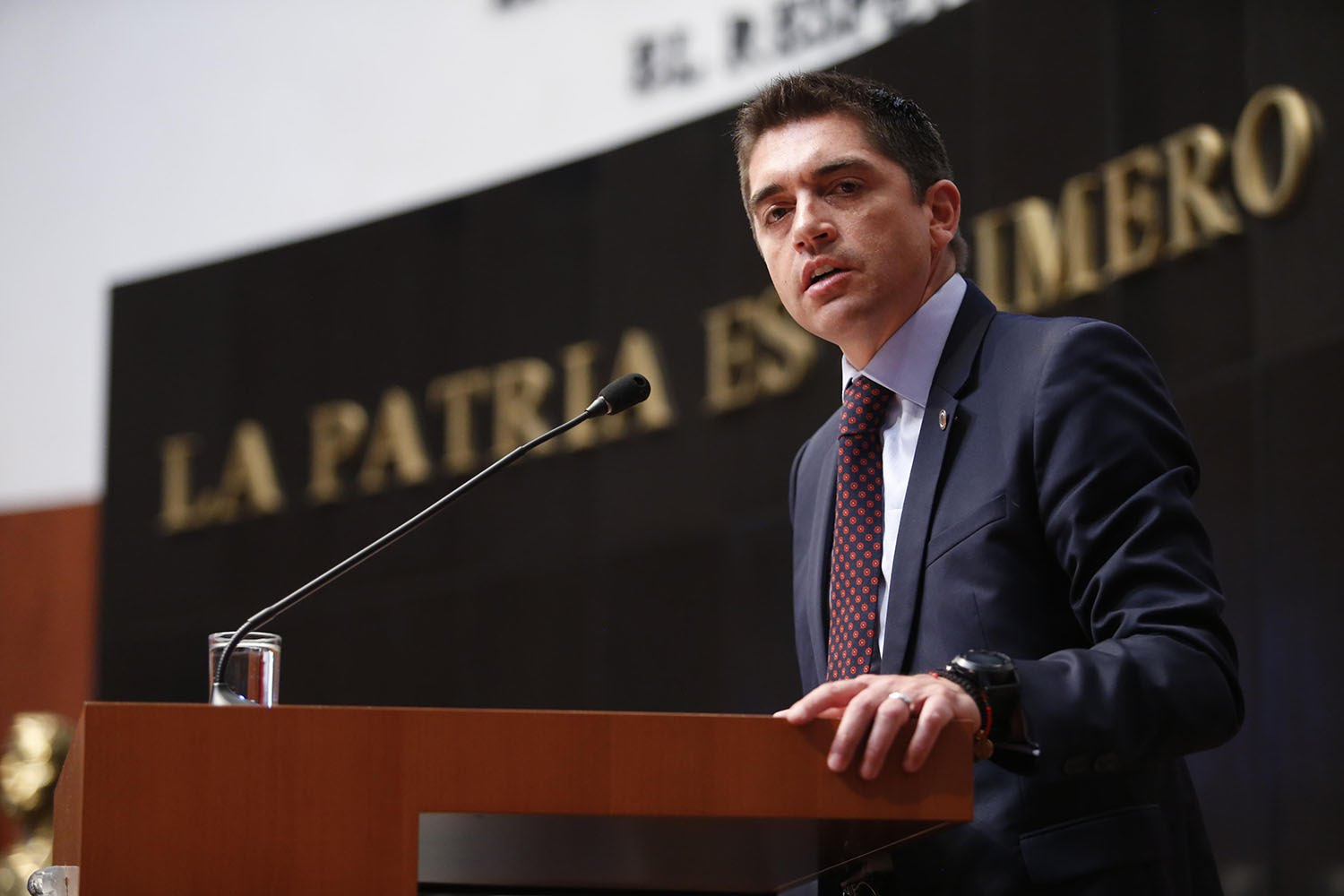
- Salazar in 2016
- Born: 18 November 1977 (age 48); Torreón, Coahuila, Mexico
- Education: Universidad Iberoamericana; George Washington University
- Occupation: Senator
- Political party: MORENA

Luis Fernando Salazar Fernández ( Born in born 18 November 1977 in Torreón, Coahuila de Zaragoza) He is a Mexican politician currently affiliated with the Morena since September 1st 2024, he previously was a member of the National Action Party (PAN). He is a senator for Coahuila in the 62nd and 63rd sessions of Congress and a federal deputy during the 64th Congress, representing Coahuila's fifth district.

Salazar Fernández won election as one of Coahuila's senators in the 2024 Senate election, occupying the first place on the Sigamos Haciendo Historia coalition's two-name formula.
