= Héctor Fernández Aguirre =

Mexican politician

- Born: 5 August 1943 (age 82); Torreón, Coahuila, Mexico
- Occupation: Politician
- Political party: PRI

Héctor Fernández Aguirre (born 5 August 1943) is a Mexican politician from the Institutional Revolutionary Party (PRI). From 2009 to 2012 he served as a federal deputy in the 61st Congress, representing Coahuila's sixth district.
