= Parras Municipality =

Municipality in the Mexican state of Coahuila

Parras
- Municipality
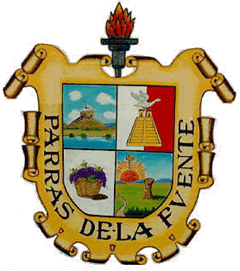
- Coat of arms

- Municipality of Parras in Coahuila

- Location in Mexico
- Coordinates: 25°26′27″N 102°11′10″W
- Country: Mexico
- State: Coahuila
- Municipal seat: Parras de la Fuente

Area
  - Total: 9,271.7 km^{2} (3,579.8 sq mi)

Population (2005)
  - Total: 44,715

Parras is one of the 38 municipalities of Coahuila, in north-eastern Mexico. The municipal seat lies at Parras de la Fuente. The municipality covers an area of 9,271.7 km^{2}.

As of 2005, the municipality had a total population of 44,715.
