= Rogelio Carbajal Tejada =

Mexican lawyer and politician

- Born: 29 October 1975 (age 50); Torreón, Coahuila, Mexico
- Education: Universidad Iberoamericana
- Occupations: Lawyer and politician
- Political party: PAN

Rogelio Carbajal Tejada (born 29 October 1975) is a Mexican lawyer and politician from the National Action Party. From 2006 to 2009 he served as Deputy of the LX Legislature of the Mexican Congress representing Coahuila.
