= Carlos Augusto Bracho González =

Mexican politician

- Born: 4 July 1964 (age 61); Torreón, Coahuila, Mexico
- Occupation: Politician
- Political party: PAN

Carlos Augusto Bracho González (born 4 July 1964) is a Mexican politician affiliated with the National Action Party (PAN). In 2006–2009 he served as a federal deputy in the 60th session of Congress, representing Coahuila's fifth district.
