= Parras =

City in the Mexican state of Coahuila

Parras, Coahuila
- City
- Parras de la Fuente
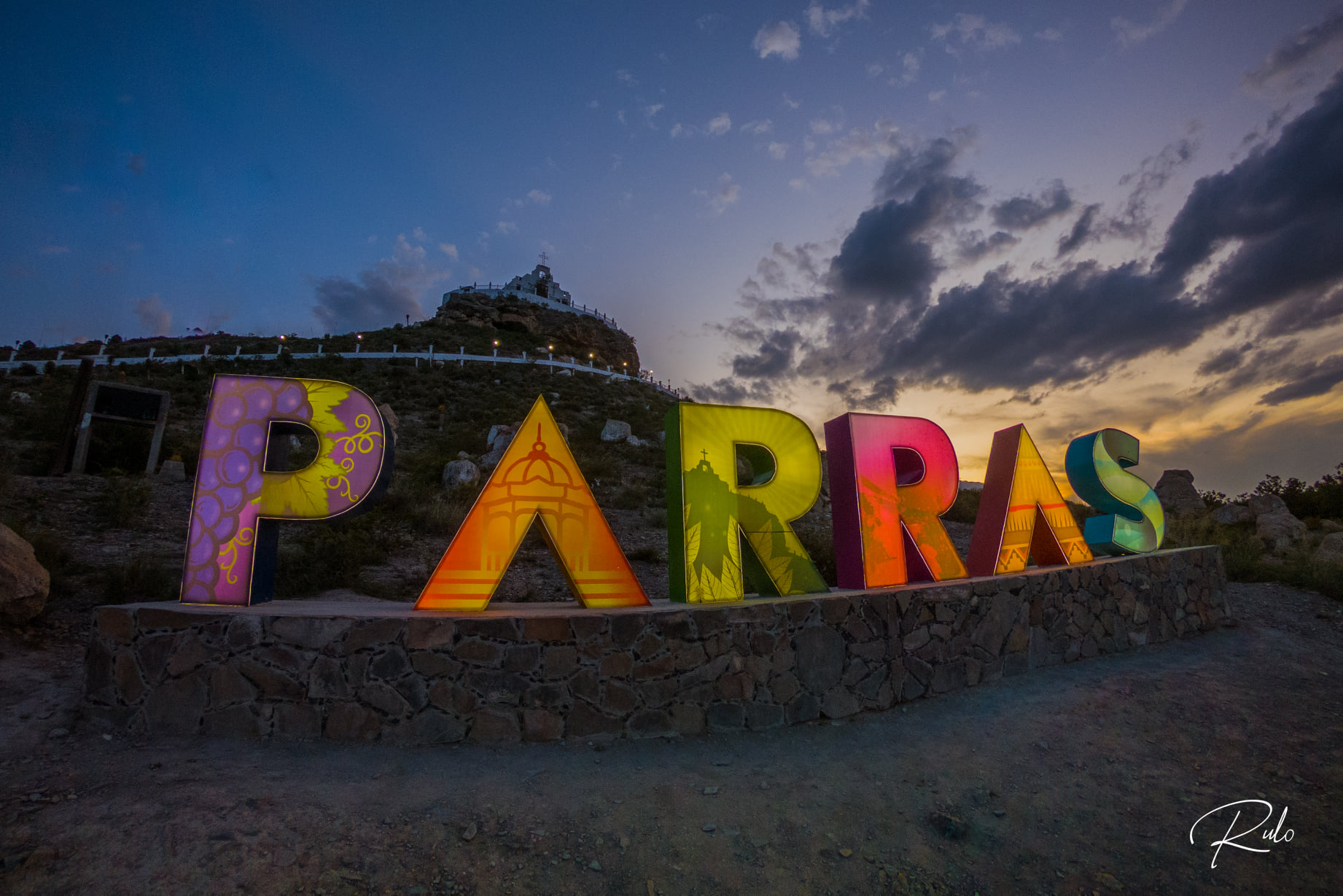

- Location in Mexico Parras, Coahuila (Mexico)
- Coordinates: 25°26′25″N 102°10′45″W
- Country: Mexico
- State: Coahuila
- Municipality: Parras
- Founded: February 18, 1598
- Founded as: Villa de Santa María de las Parras
- Founder: Antón Martín Zapata; Juan Agustín de Espinosa
- Elevation: 1,500 m (4,900 ft)

Population (2010)
  - Total: 44,472
- Time zone: UTC-6 (Central Standard Time)

Parras de la Fuente (pronounced [ˈparas ðe la ˈfwente]) is a city located in the southern part of the Mexican state of Coahuila. The city serves as the municipal seat of the surrounding Parras Municipality, which has an area of 9,271.7 km^{2} (3,579.8 sq mi).

At the census of 2020, the population was 44,472. There are many factories that produce denim and Parras is also a source for Mexican wine. It was the first wine growing region in the Americas.

== History ==
The former Hacienda del Rosario is the place where Parras de la Fuente was founded in 1598, by Capitán Antón Martín de Zapata. The revolutionary and President of Mexico Francisco I. Madero was born here in 1873.

In 1846, during the Mexican–American War, Parras was held by American troops. Additionally, French forces were defeated there in 1866 during the French intervention in Mexico.

The oldest winery in the Americas is in Parras de la Fuente, and was founded by Lorenzo García on August 19, 1597. Casa Madero is home to the oldest winery.

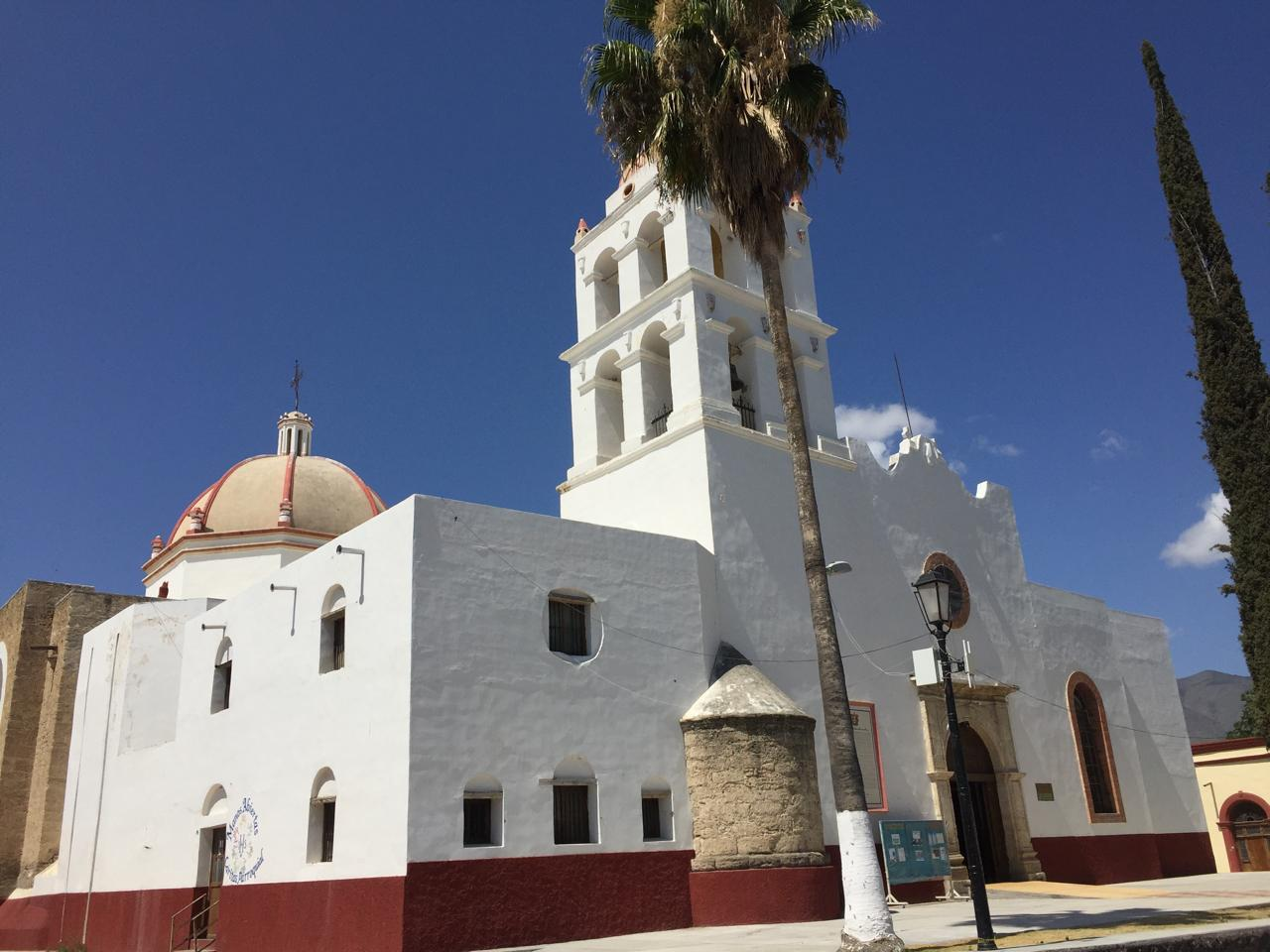
The church of Santa María de las Parras which is the oldest religious building in Mexico (1598).

== Climate ==
Climate data for Parras (1991–2020)
Month	Jan	Feb	Mar	Apr	May	Jun	Jul	Aug	Sep	Oct	Nov	Dec	Year
Record high °C (°F)	32.0 (89.6)	35.5 (95.9)	36.5 (97.7)	42.0 (107.6)	42.0 (107.6)	42.0 (107.6)	44.0 (111.2)	41.0 (105.8)	42.0 (107.6)	38.0 (100.4)	35.0 (95.0)	32.0 (89.6)	44.0 (111.2)
Mean daily maximum °C (°F)	21.0 (69.8)	23.3 (73.9)	26.4 (79.5)	30.0 (86.0)	32.5 (90.5)	32.7 (90.9)	31.7 (89.1)	31.5 (88.7)	29.1 (84.4)	27.8 (82.0)	24.2 (75.6)	21.2 (70.2)	27.6 (81.7)
Daily mean °C (°F)	13.6 (56.5)	15.6 (60.1)	18.4 (65.1)	21.8 (71.2)	24.4 (75.9)	25.1 (77.2)	24.7 (76.5)	24.2 (75.6)	22.1 (71.8)	20.5 (68.9)	16.9 (62.4)	13.9 (57.0)	20.1 (68.2)
Mean daily minimum °C (°F)	6.2 (43.2)	7.8 (46.0)	10.4 (50.7)	13.6 (56.5)	16.3 (61.3)	17.5 (63.5)	17.6 (63.7)	16.9 (62.4)	15.2 (59.4)	13.1 (55.6)	9.6 (49.3)	6.6 (43.9)	12.6 (54.7)
Record low °C (°F)	−10.8 (12.6)	−12.0 (10.4)	−5.0 (23.0)	1.7 (35.1)	4.0 (39.2)	7.0 (44.6)	5.5 (41.9)	10.0 (50.0)	6.0 (42.8)	0.0 (32.0)	−7.0 (19.4)	−8.0 (17.6)	−12.0 (10.4)
Average precipitation mm (inches)	8.4 (0.33)	9.3 (0.37)	12.2 (0.48)	6.6 (0.26)	18.3 (0.72)	38.9 (1.53)	70.9 (2.79)	43.6 (1.72)	70.3 (2.77)	26.4 (1.04)	10.0 (0.39)	7.6 (0.30)	322.5 (12.70)
Average precipitation days (≥ 0.1 mm)	2.0	1.3	1.8	1.6	4.0	6.3	9.2	7.3	8.0	4.0	2.3	1.9	49.7
Source: Servicio Meteorologico Nacional

== Features ==
Main plaza in Parras de la Fuente

Parras de la Fuente is a Pueblo Mágico, designated in 2004. Parras is called the oasis of the semi-desert of Coahuila state. It has bathing resorts (which were used to generate electric power for industry usage).

The Municipality President's building, a historical attraction, is a replica of the State's Government Palace in Saltillo. The Hostal el Farol is the historic former house of General Raúl Madero. San Ignacio de Loyola church was built in the 17th century. Santo Madero church is located on an extinct volcano plug just north of the town.

== Academic programs ==
- Parras Summer Program, in Spanish language and culture and appropriate technology; a program of Humboldt State University in Arcata, California

== Notable people ==
- Senator Francisco José Madero González, who was interim Governor of Coahuila from August 12, 1981, to November 30, 1981.

== Sister city ==
- (United States) Grapevine, Texas, USA

== See also ==
- Pueblo Mágico
