= Baja California wine industry =

The Baja California wine industry is concentrated in a small area of the state of Baja California, Mexico. Most of the production is in the Valle de Guadalupe, there is also grape and wine production in some neighboring valleys. These valleys all have Mediterranean-type microclimates, instead of desert, thanks to sea breezes and fog which comes inland from the Pacific Ocean. Though a bit warmer and drier, the region produces many of the same grapes as in California, US, producing varietals that originated in southern France, Spain, Portugal, Italy and Greece.

While wine was first made here in the late 17th century/early 18th, premium winemaking did not begin until the 1980s, with the success of the Monte Xanic winery. Wine making is very eclectic here, with no one style dominating the scene. The success of the modern wine industry has spurred a tourism industry as well, though not as developed as in some other parts of Mexico.

== Environment ==
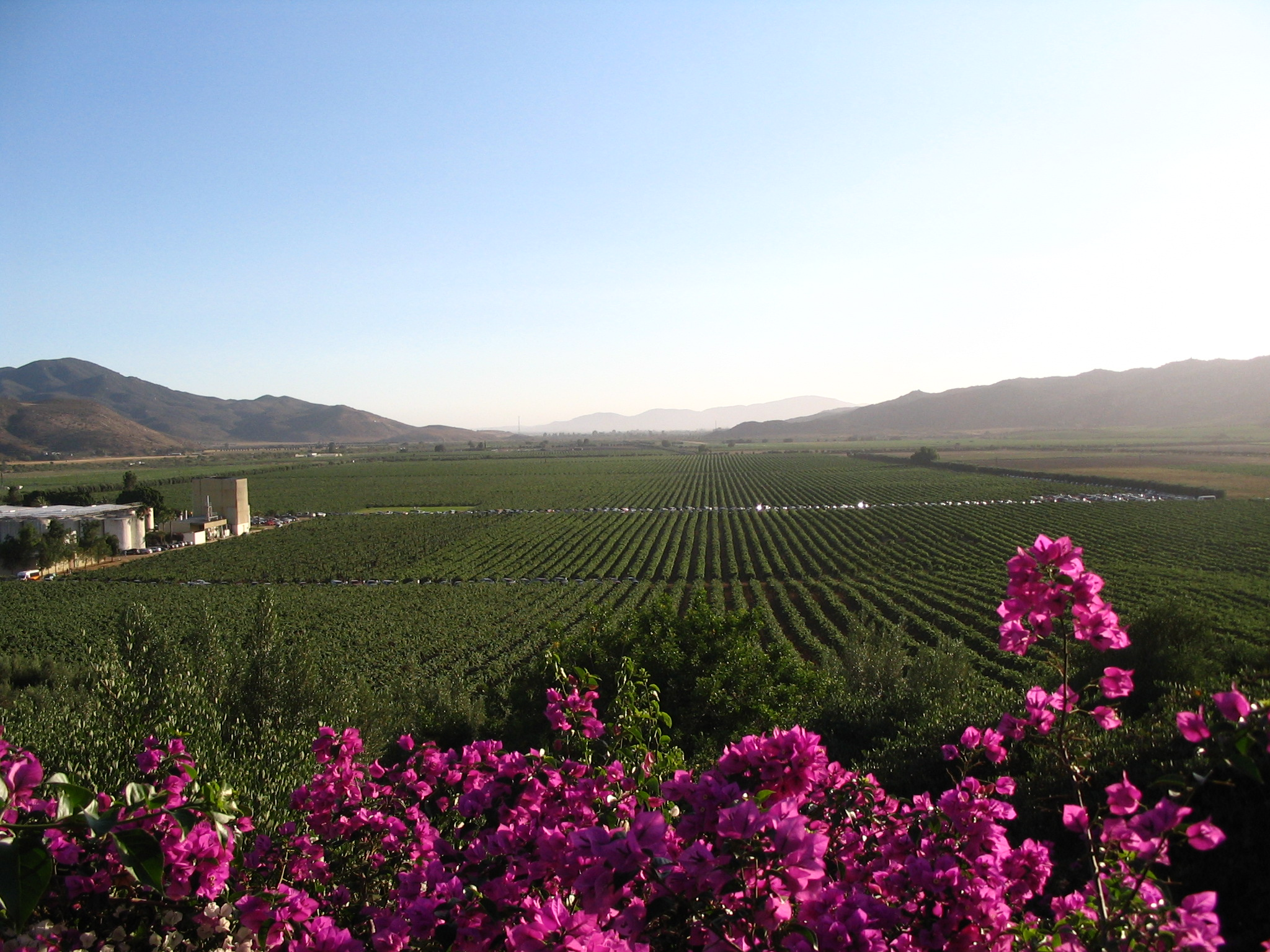
View of vineyards in the Valle de Guadalupe

Most of Mexico lies south of the 30-50 degree latitude range for most wine grapes, but altitude and other factors do allow for production. The Baja California peninsula was originally under the sea until tectonic movement raised it and began the process of breaking down the granite, allowing it to mix with alluvial soil of clay, sand and other minerals to form the soils the vines grow in today. Wine grapes are only grown in a specific part of northern Baja California, where the microclimates produce an environment similar to areas in California. These are four main valleys that extend perpendicular to the Pacific Ocean, allowing for the entrance of sea breezes and fogs to moderate otherwise desert into Mediterranean microclimates. Baja has humid winters, dry warm summers. Like southern California, June fogs slow the ripening of fruit, but harvests still begin in late July.

Overall, the area is warmer and drier than California, and water is a major issue. Average annual rainfall varies from seven to twenty two centimeters per year. Grapevines need at least thirteen. Irrigation is necessary relying on springs and groundwater. Drought conditions from 2010 to 2015 lowered levels in wells as much as nine meters. Even under normal conditions, the water available in the Valle de Guadalupe area is high is salt and other minerals. The drought raised that salinity even more, to the point that it could be tasted in well water. Some grape varieties such as Semillon and Viognier do not do well with saline conditions and some Syrahs can taste salty. Some winemakers work to reduce the salinity of the water but others insist that it gives the wine more body.

The lack of water is a major limiting factor for the continued growth of grape growing in this area. Some changes in farming are being made such as shifting o drip or subsurface irrigation, cutting away grape clusters to decrease the need for water (which improves grape quality) and planting more white grapes, which ripen faster. Wineries that can afford are setting up water treatment plants to reclaim waste water. A new technology is applying polymer gels to plant roots. When wet the gel retains water and less irrigation is needed. Although the Valle de Guadalupe has the most prestige, wineries are looking into neighboring valleys with better water supplies, while other are looking into diversifying into other products such as olives.

Baja has four principal areas all near Ensenada: Valle de Guadalupe, Calafia Valley, San Vicente Valley, Santo Tomas Valley and to some extent, the San Rafael Valley. The average altitude is about 1000 feet above sea level. Most of the area's vineyards and winemaking facilities are in the Valle de Guadalupe, just northeast of the port city of Ensenada. This valley extends about fifteen miles northeast to southwest with an opening near the ocean. This allows cool air current to move inland and temper the area's heat and also allows for the temperature swings that grapes need. Land prices have risen over the past 20 years from about US$7,000 per hectare to more than $100,000. This is one reason why people already in Valle de Guadalupe are looking into nearby valleys such as Santo Tomas, San Vicente and Ojos Negros. The Valle de Calafia is in the northeast and the Valle de las Palmas at the north. Other wine-producing valleys include the Santo Tomás Valley, with an altitude of 750 feet above sea level, the San Vicente Valley at 350 feet, both south of Ensenada. Ojos Negros is cooler and wetter than Valle de Guadalupe. There is one winery in Ojos Negros, Bodegas San Rafael, owned by the Hussong family of the Hussong Cantina in Ensenada. It claims to be the origin of the margarita.

== Production ==
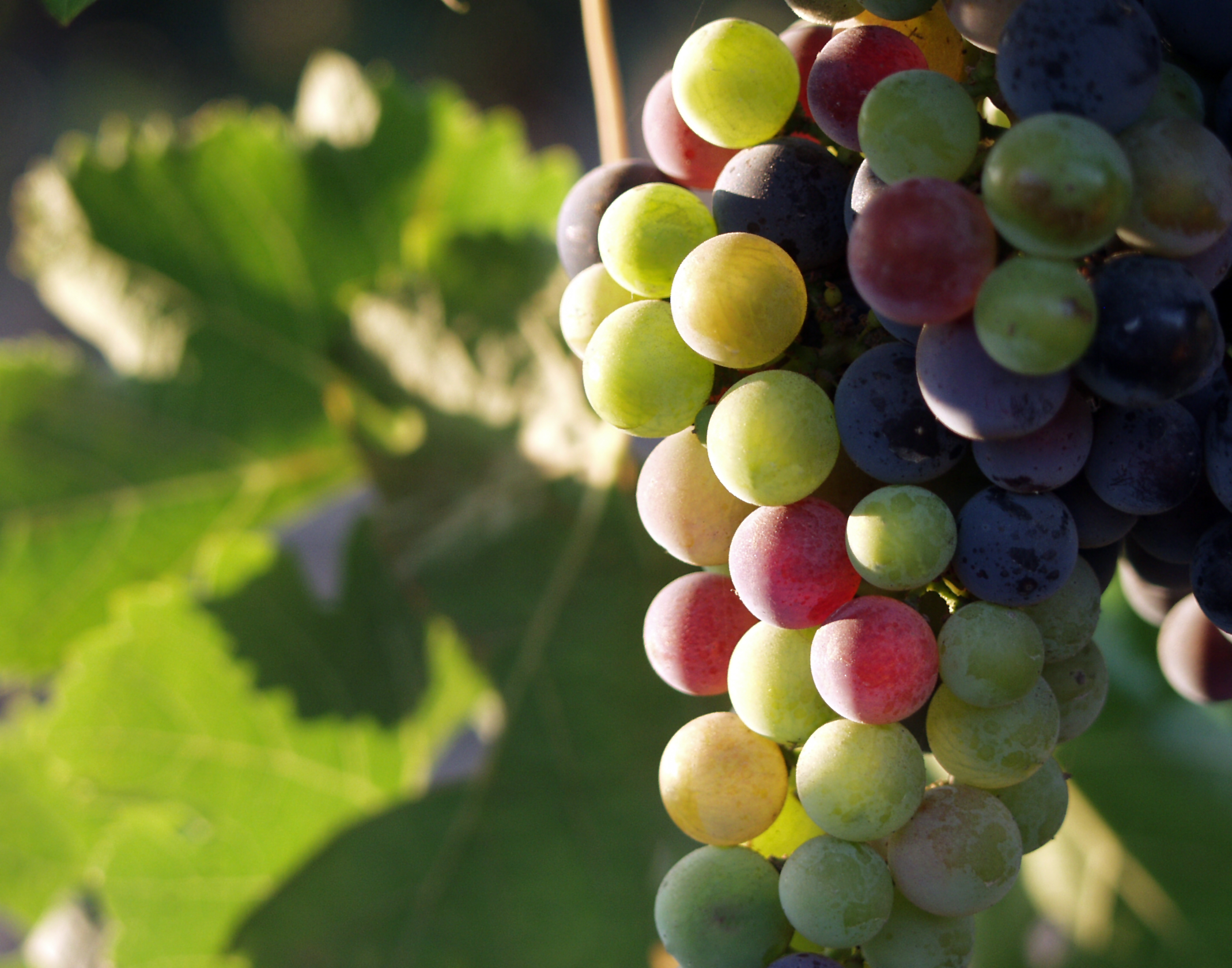
Grapes during pigmentation in the Valle de Guadalupe

While there is grape and wine production in the interior of Mexico, northern Baja seems to be better suited to the production of more and better wines. About 90% of all Mexican wines are produced here and just about all the award-winning vintages do. Most of the wine grapes grown her are those grown in California, with the addition of tempranillo and Chenin Blanc, which is one of the most popular varieties. The dry and hotter climate along with tradition should dictate what is grown here but that is not really the case. Although grape varieties from warmer regions such as southern France, Spain, Italy, etc. are more favored, but about all varietals are grown here except those which absolutely need cooler temperatures. No one variety dominates and most of the better-known grapes. Camillo Magoni of Casa Magoni winery has planted over 100 varieties himself.

While the quality of the wine produced here can vary widely, wines from Baja tend to be richly colored and full-bodied. The main reason for this is that the climate tends to produce grapes with thick skins, which create more intense flavors and aromas. The Nebbiolo of Baja produces a dark, inky wine unlike any other of its types in the world, having more in common with a Petite Sirah than its cousins in Italy. These vines arrived after World War II but identification tags were lost in transit, so no one knows exactly what varieties they are.

Many growing and production methods are newer as most wineries have been in existence for only a short time. Many vineyards are new or recently replanted using modern cultivation techniques, improved rootstocks and cultivars. Most wines are fermented in stainless steel. Length of maceration and fermentation depends on the producer. Red wines are usually aged in French or American oak for a period of between a couple to as many as 24 months. What really sets Baja wine apart from other regions is its “wild west” approach to winemaking, as most winemakers here are not too attached to tradition. Blending grape varieties is very common including unusual combinations such as Cabernet blended with Nebbiolo or Grenache. The Mexican government is not involved in the regulation of the wine industry, with no appellation laws and nothing dictating how wines are manufactured or labeled.

== History ==
Mexico has a long history of wine making, even if it is not distinguished. It was first in the New World to have grape vines planted. Mission grape (Listan Prieto) vines were brought to Baja in the late 17th century to make sacramental wine. Jesuit priest Juan Jugarte established the first vineyards in Baja California in 1701 at the Loreto Mission. However, at this same time, Charles II ordered all vineyards in the New World destroyed to protect wine making on the Spanish homeland. Catholic missions were exempted, allowed to make small amounts for religious purposes. Despite this restriction, the missions became significant wine producers. Between 1699 and 1857, they produced virtually all the wine made in Mexico. The Santo Tomás Mission founded in 1791 became Mexico largest wine producer. The Dominicans founded mission and in 1843 their first vineyard in the Nuestra Señora de Guadalupe del Norte Valley. Today, this Valle de Guadalupe is the center of Mexico fine wine production.

In 1857, the Mexican government seized all land holdings of the Catholic Church. Some vineyards, like those in Santo Tomas were sold to private entities, but many of the vine yards were simply abandoned. In the late 19th and very early 20th century, Russian Molokan refugees arrived to the Valle de Guadalupe and began growing grapes. Francisco Zarco was founded by these immigrants and there are still headstones with the Cyrillic alphabet. Around this same time, James Concannon and Antonio Perrelli-Minetti introduced several French grapes, along with Zinfandel. Many vineyards were lost in the early 20th century due to a Phylloxera infestation, and more disruption was caused by the Mexican Revolution.

In 1931, Italian Esteban Ferro introduced Italian and more French varieties, marking the start of Baja as a wine-producing region. Before World War II, most wine was imported from Europe. In 1948, the Mexican government banned the import of luxury goods such as wine, encouraging Pedro Domecq to establish a winery and distillery in Baja California. In 1949, the National Association of Wine Producers was founded with an initial membership of fifteen wineries. Fourteen more were added in the 1950s.

True commercial wine operations did not begin until the 1970s. Casa Pedro Domecq was founded in 1972 and L.A. Cetto shortly after in 1974. During the decade, production increased three-fold due to larger vineyards and the introduction of new technologies. By the end of the decade Mexican wineries were selling about four million cases per year. Most of this production was of average and cheap commercial wines. However, Hugo D'Acosta founded La Escuelita (Little School) at this time to teach local growers more modern processing methods. It also worked to provide members with equipment. La Escuelita has had more than 300 students and many of these have founded or work at wineries in the area.

The decision to open the country to foreign products including wines in the early 1980s, led to a major drop in production in Baja, with Mexican wines unable to compete with U.S. Chilean and European vintages. The number of Mexican wineries in the entire country dropped from 82 to fifteen. Those that survived were larger enterprises who made other products as well as wine.

The renaissance of the Baja wine industry began in the 1980s, with what happened here comparable to what happened in California in the 1960s, with an emphasis on quality. The Monte Xanic winery is credited with the push towards premium wines, with its success prompting other wineries to bring in oenologists from Europe. Even the larger, established wineries have since upgraded their product lines in response. Baja accounts for 90% of all Mexican wine production, but this is only a total of 1.6 cases per year. Most wine grapes are still grown to produce brandy, as Mexico is the third largest producer of this beverage in the world.

One reason for the low production is that demand for wine in Mexico is very low, although this is changing. Mexico ranks only 66th in the world in wine consumption, with many Mexicans preferring beer, spirits and even soft drinks over wine. One reason for this is that many Mexicans do not feel that wine pairs well with their food. Another reason is that many wine drinkers in the country are from the upper classes, which tend to prefer the foreign over the domestic. As of 2015, only a third of the four million cases of wine consumed in the country, only a third was domestic. However, there have been signs since the 1980s that this is changing. Per capita wine consumption has doubled in the past decade and has become a beverage for the aspiring middle class. The success of Monte Xanic was among younger wine drinkers, who tend to be more proud of their Mexican heritage. These two factors means that in good years, sometimes entire vintages of prestigious brands are sold before they are even made.

== Winemakers ==
The three main producers in Baja are L.A. Cetto, Casa Domecq, and Bodega de Santa Tomas, with Cetto and Domecq by themselves accounting for 80% of Mexico's wine production. Of the eighty or so other wineries, most are small and family owned, and there are hundreds of non-professional artisan wine makers. Many working in the wine industry here were trained in California, Oregon, and Washington, especially the field workers. Many of the winemakers have experience in Europe and the western United States. However, only a limited number of producers are making wines that can participate in international competitions.

Casa Domecq was originally called Vides del Guadalupe and was the first modern commercial winery in Baja California. It owns about half of the 6,500 acres under wine cultivation in Baja, but it is still better known for its brandy than its wine. Its best known wine is Padre Kino, developed in 1972 to cater to the Mexican taste for sweeter wine. (lindajoy) Its vineyards produce Zinfandel, Chenin Blanc, Riesling, and Cabernet Sauvignon.

L. A. Cetto was founded in 1974 and today is the largest commercial vintner in Mexico with about 3,000 acres under cultivation. It was founded by Luis A. Cetto (Sr) who immigrated to Mexico from Trento, Italy, starting the business in 1934. The company makes a number of products in addition to wine.

Bodegas de Santo Tomás is Baja's oldest existing winery, founded in 1791 with true commercial production beginning in 1888. It was originally founded with the grape vines of the old Santo Tomas mission. The winery moved to Ensenada in 1900 and to its current facilities in 1934. The winery has dramatically upgraded its wines, most recently under Laura Zamora, Mexico's only female wine maker. The wineries major sellers are Cabernet Sauvignon, Chenin Blanc and Grenache Rose. It has had facilities for tourists for a very long time.

Monte Xanic is currently the most prestigious brand of wines coming out of Baja California. Monte Xanic is credited with setting a higher standard for Mexican wine. Hans Backhoff founded Monte Xanic to prove that Mexico could make great wine and began changing Mexico's reputation. In the 1980s, no one dared to make premium wine in Mexico. Since then most wineries make at least one.

Casa de Piedra is run by Hugo D'Acosta a former winemaker from the Bodega de Santo Tomas and founded of a local school for winemakers. Hugo D'Acosta was raised in Mexico City, trained in France and initially worked for Santo Tomas before founding Casa de Piedra just north of Ensenada. His first wines were released in 1997. Wines like Vino de Piedra, a blend of tempranillo and cabernet has a cult following in Mexico.

Other commercial wineries include Vinos Bibayoff (early 1970s), Casa Valmar (1983), San Antonio (1986), Mogor-Badan (1987), Chateau Camou (1991), Vina de Liceaga (1993), Casa de Piedra (1997) Adobe Guadalupe (2001), Rincon de Guadalupe (2001) and Vinisterra (2002).

== Tourism ==
The success of the wine industry since the 1980s has spurred something of a tourism industry. Tourists coming to see and tastes the wines have led to the establishment of finer restaurants, and various types of lodging, from bed and breakfasts, inns and “luxury camping.” These are particularly in demand during the annual harvest festivals in July and August, with includes street parties and culinary exhibitions and competitions along with wine tasting. Monte Xanic holds a series of sunset concerts at its theatre located on its artificial lake.

The wine industry has supported a culinary evolution. The restaurant scene is growing and gaining reputation with chefs such as Javier Plascencia and Miguel Angel Guerrero creating what is called Baja Med cuisine. The cuisine was created specifically to complement the local wine, focused on local products, especially seafood. Two restaurants Corazon de Tierra and Laja 2 of the ten Mexican restaurants on the list of Latin America's 50 Best Restaurants recommended by Restaurant magazine.

Many restaurants and lodgings are attached to wineries. Villa del Valle is a bed and breakfast with restaurant and winery founded by British expats Eileen and Phil Gregory, who arrived in 2005. Phil had a career in music in Los Angeles before coming here to make organic wines. They produce Sauvignon Blanc and Cabernet Sauvignon. They are a supplier to renowned Mexico City restaurant Pujol.

The Ruta del Vino was established by the local tourist board to help visitors discover the local wine scene. It lists more than 60 wineries in 35 square mile area, providing updated maps. In addition, there is a Valle de Guadalupe Community Museum, on land donated by Monte Xanic, as well as the wine museum that was opened by president Vicente Fox in 2012. However, the tourism industry is not as organized as in some other parts of Mexico and many roads are still dirt.
