= Laura Reyes Retana =

Mexican politician

- Born: 10 September 1955 (age 70); Torreón, Coahuila, Mexico
- Occupation: Politician
- Political party: PRI

Laura Reyes Retana Ramos (born 10 September 1955) is a Mexican politician affiliated with the Institutional Revolutionary Party. She served as Deputy of the LIX Legislature of the Mexican Congress representing Coahuila, and previously served in the Congress of Coahuila.
