= Antonio Juan Marcos Issa =

Mexican businessman

Antonio Juan Marcos Issa (born October 26, 1946; Torreón, Coahuila) is a businessman of Mexico.

== Life ==
He studied economics in University of Nuevo León, graduated in 1969. Also, he has a master's degree in economic planning in the New School for Social Research in New York City.

He has been professor in the Economics Faculty of the University of Nuevo León; lecturer in the Economics School of the Instituto Tecnológico Autónomo de México; was director of Economic Studies Department of the Instituto Mexicano de Comercio Exterior.

As a public servant, between 1973 and 1977 occupied the Subdirection of Industrial Production in the Mexican Institute of Coffee (Inmecafé), after that until 1980 was chief director of Fondo Nacional para Actividades Sociales (FONAPAS). Ambassador of Mexico in the FAO during two years from 1980 to 1982,

He was also representative of Pemex Europe at its head office in Paris, France between 1983 and 1986. At the Secretariat of Foreign Affairs he worked as regional director till 1993. He was Director of Finances of Coahuila state during 6 years. General advisory in General Direction of Pemex from 2000 to February 2003.

As a businessman, he has participated in the agricultural and construction businesses since 1985, currently has investments in energy.
