= 2024 Coahuila elections =

Mexican state election

The 2024 Coahuila elections was held on June 2, 2024 to decide the 38 Municipalities top level positions around the state. Municipal elections in Coahuila allow the people to elect members of the Ayuntamiento (City Council) in each municipality. These are called the 38 municipal presidents (Mayors), 74 sindicos and 400 regidores (city councilors). The term of office of councilors, the mayor and his deputies is, in principle, three years. The municipal elections are sanctioned by Electoral Institute of Coahuila since its creation in 2016. Elected officials began their three-year terms on 1 January 2025.

== Background ==
By the 2024, Institutional Revolutionary Party holds 18 out of 38 municipalities seeking to retain them and with the additional goal of winning more. National Action Party holds 2 municipalities, after its electoral preferences are plummeted. Meanwhile, federal government party National Regeneration Movement holds 4 municipalities (San Juan de Sabinas, Sabinas, Francisco I. Madero, and Muzquiz) since 2021 and during June counts with high-expectations in Coahuila to obtain more municipalities due to the Lopez Obrador popularity.

== Election results ==
=== Northern region ===
==== Acuna ====
Acuna Municipality
Party	Candidate	Votes		Seats
National Action Party	Juanita Anel Peña	426	0.61%	0 / 20
Institutional Revolutionary Party	Emilio de Hoyos Montemayor	25,447	36.70%	13 / 20
Party of the Democratic Revolution	Emilio de Hoyos Montemayor	2,532	3.65%	0 / 20
Ecologist Green Party of Mexico	Pablo Ortega Alvarado	4,005	5.78%	2 / 20
Labor Party	Paloma de los Santos Perez	1,853	2.67%	0 / 20
Democratic Unity of Coahuila	Emilio de Hoyos Montemayor (incumbent)	19,044	27.47%	0 / 20
Citizens' Movement	Yarissa Martinez Garcia	1,134	1.64%	0 / 20
National Regeneration Movement	Paloma de los Santos Perez	14,892	21.48%	5 / 20
Valid votes			69333 (96.79%)	
Blank vote/Spoilt vote/Protest vote/Write-in candidate			2303 (3.21%)	
Turnout			55.06 %	
Abstention			44.94%	
Total votes			71636	
PREP-Electoral Institute of Coahuila

==== Guerrero ====
Guerrero Municipality
Party	Candidate	Votes		Seats
National Action Party	Manuel Espinoza Luna	261	18.74%	1 / 10
Institutional Revolutionary Party	Mario Cedillo Infante	723	51.90%	7 / 10
Party of the Democratic Revolution	Mario Cedillo Infante	19	1.36%	0 / 10
Labor Party	Heliodoro Rodriguez Rodriguez	79	5.67%	0 / 10
Democratic Unity of Coahuila	Mario Cedillo Infante	10	0.72%	0 / 10
National Regeneration Movement	Heliodoro Rodriguez Rodriguez	301	21.61%	2 / 10
Valid votes			1393 (98.45%)	
Blank vote/Spoilt vote/Protest vote/Write-in candidate			22 (1.55%)	
Turnout			74.87%	
Abstention			25.13%	
Total votes			1415	
PREP-Electoral Institute of Coahuila

==== Hidalgo ====
Hidalgo Municipality
Party	Candidate	Votes		Seats
Institutional Revolutionary Party	Aleida Guzman Vargas	329	29.94%	2 / 10
Party of the Democratic Revolution	Aleida Guzman Vargas	43	3.91%	0 / 10
Ecologist Green Party of Mexico	Mario Cruz Gutierrez	207	18.44%	1 / 10
Democratic Unity of Coahuila	Aleida Guzman Vargas	20	1.82%	0 / 10
Citizens' Movement	Conrrado Navarro Sanchez	500	45.50%	7 / 10
Valid votes			1099 (99.37%)	
Blank vote/Spoilt vote/Protest vote/Write-in candidate			7 (0.63%)	
Turnout			78.11%	
Abstention			21.89%	
Total votes			1106	
PREP-Electoral Institute of Coahuila

==== Jimenez ====
Jimenez Municipality
Party	Candidate	Votes		Seats
Institutional Revolutionary Party	Claudia Maribel Gonzalez	2019	39.46%	9 / 14
Party of the Democratic Revolution	Claudia Maribel Gonzalez	150	2.93%	0 / 10
Labor Party	Alma Rosa Sanchez Vallejo	402	7.86%	1 / 14
Democratic Unity of Coahuila	Claudia Maribel Gonzalez	390	7.62%	0 / 14
Citizens' Movement	Omar Roquetty Castillo	639	12.49%	1 / 14
National Regeneration Movement	Alma Rosa Sanchez Vallejo	1517	29.65%	3 / 14
Valid votes			5117 (96.39%)	
Blank vote/Spoilt vote/Protest vote/Write-in candidate			195 (3.67%)	
Turnout			59.57%	
Abstention			40.43%	
Total Votes			5312	
PREP-Electoral Institute of Coahuila

==== Piedras Negras ====
Piedras Negras Municipality
Party	Candidate	Votes		Seats
National Action Party	Ursula Garcia Villarreal	745	0.88%	0 / 20
Institutional Revolutionary Party	Norma Treviño Galindo (incumbent)	34503	40.95%	6 / 20
Party of the Democratic Revolution	Norma Treviño Galindo	1832	2.17%	0 / 20
Ecologist Green Party of Mexico	Raul Tamez Robledo	1005	1.19%	0 / 20
Labor Party	Jacobo Rodriguez	10018	11.89%	0 / 20
Democratic Unity of Coahuila	Norma Treviño Galindo	687	0.82%	0 / 20
Citizens' Movement	Anselmo Elizondo Davila	3176	3.77%	1 / 20
National Regeneration Movement	Jacobo Rodriguez	32285	38.32%	13 / 20
Valid votes			84251 (96.70%)	
Blank vote/Spoilt vote/Protest vote/Write-in candidate			2873 (3.30%)	
Turnout			60.05%	
Abstention			39.95%	
Total votes			87124	
PREP-Electoral Institute of Coahuila

=== Five Springs Region ===
==== Allende ====
Allende Municipality
Party	Candidate	Votes		Seats
National Action Party	Brenda Zurita Cervera	209	1.71%	0 / 14
Institutional Revolutionary Party	Jose de Jesus Diaz Gutierrez	4708	38.42%	5 / 14
Party of the Democratic Revolution	Jose de Jesus Diaz Gutierrez	233	1.90%	0 / 14
Labor Party	Ricardo Treviño Guevara	1888	15.41%	0 / 14
Democratic Unity of Coahuila	Jose de Jesus Diaz Gutierrez	120	0.98%	0 / 14
Citizens' Movement	Gamarys Calvillo Espinoza	252	2.06%	0 / 14
National Regeneration Movement	Ricardo Treviño Guevara	4843	39.53%	9 / 14
Valid votes			12253 (97.91%)	
Blank vote/Spoilt vote/Protest vote/Write-in candidate			261 (2.09%)	
Turnout			63.46%	
Abstention			36.54%	
Total votes			12514	
PREP-Electoral Institute of Coahuila

==== Morelos ====
Morelos Municipality
Party	Candidate	Votes		Seats
National Action Party	Estela Garza de Luna	131	2.84%	0 / 14
Institutional Revolutionary Party	Mario Camarillo Zertuche	2748	59.58%	9 / 14
Party of the Democratic Revolution	Mario Camarillo Zertuche (incumbent)	98	2.12%	0 / 14
Ecologist Green Party of Mexico	Natali Garcia Ontiveros	183	3.97%	1 / 14
Labor Party	Griselda Treviño Jimenez	402	8.72%	1 / 14
Democratic Unity of Coahuila	Mario Camarillo Zertuche	69	1.50%	0 / 14
Citizens' Movement	Carlos Ferraez Gomez	46	1.00%	0 / 14
National Regeneration Movement	Griselda Treviño Jimenez	935	20.27%	3 / 14
Valid votes			4612 (97.14%)	
Blank vote/Spoilt vote/Protest vote/Write-in candidate			136 (2.86%)	
Turnout			63.59%	
Abstention			36.41%	
Total votes			4748	
PREP-Electoral Institute of Coahuila

==== Nava ====
Nava Municipality
Party	Candidate	Votes		Seats
National Action Party	Olga Cervantes Aguirre	162	1.05%	0 / 14
Institutional Revolutionary Party	Maria del Pilar Valenzuela	4172	26.98%	5 / 14
Party of the Democratic Revolution	Maria del Pilar Valenzuela	453	2.93%	0 / 14
Ecologist Green Party of Mexico	Susana Garcia Rangel	121	0.78%	0 / 14
Labor Party	Ivan Ochoa Rodriguez	2607	16.86%	0 / 14
Democratic Unity of Coahuila	Maria del Pilar Valenzuela	151	0.98%	0 / 14
Citizens' Movement	Alejandra Roque Mancillas	160	1.03%	0 / 14
National Regeneration Movement	Ivan Ochoa Rodriguez	7639	49.40%	9 / 14
Valid votes			15465 (96.93%)	
Blank vote/Spoilt vote/Protest vote/Write-in candidate			490 (3.07%)	
Turnout			62.01%	
Abstention			37.99%	
Total votes			15955	
PREP-Electoral Institute of Coahuila

==== Villa Union ====
Villa Union Municipality
Party	Candidate	Votes		Seats
National Action Party	Gloria Alfaro Tello	67	1.90%	0 / 10
Institutional Revolutionary Party	Mario Gonzalez Vela	1794	50.85%	7 / 10
Party of the Democratic Revolution	Mario Gonzalez Vela	85	2.41%	0 / 10
Labor Party	Dulce Perez Treviño	243	6.89%	1 / 10
Democratic Unity of Coahuila	Mario Gonzalez Vela	132	3.74%	0 / 10
National Regeneration Movement	Dulce Perez Treviño	1207	34.21%	2 / 10
Valid votes			3528 (97.81%)	
Blank vote/Spoilt vote/Protest vote/Write-in candidate			79 (2.19%)	
Turnout			63.35 %	
Abstention			36.65%	
Total votes			3607	
PREP-Electoral Institute of Coahuila

==== Zaragoza ====
Zaragoza Municipality
Party	Candidate	Votes		Seats
National Action Party	Juan Antonio Gomez Galindo	234	3.56%	0 / 14
Institutional Revolutionary Party	Silvia Rodriguez Garza	1938	29.50%	2 / 14
Party of the Democratic Revolution	Silvia Rodriguez Garza	468	7.12%	1 / 14
Labor Party	Evelio Vara Rivera	3192	48.59%	9 / 14
Democratic Unity of Coahuila	Silvia Rodriguez Garza	259	3.94%	1 / 14
Citizens' Movement	Carlos Ernesto Santana Guerrero	478	7.28%	1 / 14
Valid votes			6569 (97.42%)	
Blank vote/Spoilt vote/Protest vote/Write-in candidate			174 (2.58%)	
Turnout			58.80%	
Abstention			41.20%	
Total votes			6743	
PREP-Electoral Institute of Coahuila

=== Coal-mining Region ===
==== Juarez ====
Juarez Municipality
Party	Candidate	Votes		Seats
National Action Party	Juan Carlos Calderon Orosco	446	42.80%	2 / 10
Institutional Revolutionary Party	Ana Lilia Quiñones	494	47.41%	7 / 10
Party of the Democratic Revolution	Ana Lilia Quiñones	20	1.92%	0 / 10
Labor Party	Amelia Corona Velazquez	48	4.61%	1 / 10
Democratic Unity of Coahuila	Ana Lilia Quiñones	4	0.38%	0 / 10
National Regeneration Movement	Amelia Corona Velazquez	30	2.88%	0 / 10
Valid votes			1042 (97.66%)	
Blank vote/Spoilt vote/Protest vote/Write-in candidate			25 (2.34%)	
Turnout			76.32%	
Abstention			23.68%	
Total votes			1067	
PREP-Electoral Institute of Coahuila

==== Muzquiz ====
Muzquiz Municipality
Party	Candidate	Votes		Seats
National Action Party	Yaneth Ornelas Abraham	248	0.70%	0 / 20
Institutional Revolutionary Party	Laura Jimenez Gutierrez	19566	54.86%	13 / 20
Party of the Democratic Revolution	Laura Jimenez Gutierrez	1049	2.94%	0 / 20
Ecologist Green Party of Mexico	Elizabeth Del Bosque Larios	218	0.61%	0 / 20
Labor Party	Tania Flores Guerra	4167	11.68%	2 / 20
Democratic Unity of Coahuila	Laura Jimenez Gutierrez	384	1.08%	0 / 20
Citizens' Movement	Monica Escalera Mendoza	1025	2.87%	0 / 20
National Regeneration Movement	Tania Flores Guerra	9009	25.26%	5 / 20
Valid votes			35666 (95.49%)	
Blank vote/Spoilt vote/Protest vote/Write-in candidate			1686 (4.51%)	
Turnout			66.05%	
Abstention			33.95%	
Total votes			37352	
PREP-Electoral Institute of Coahuila

==== Progreso ====
Progreso Municipality
Party	Candidate	Votes		Seats
National Action Party	Petra Salazar Viera	66	3.08%	0 / 10
Institutional Revolutionary Party	Federico Quintanilla Arana (incumbent)	1666	77.81%	7 / 10
Party of the Democratic Revolution	Federico Quintanilla Arana	38	1.77%	0 / 10
Labor Party	Cesar de la Garza Herrera	115	5.37%	1 / 10
Democratic Unity of Coahuila	Federico Quintanilla Arana	38	1.77%	0 / 10
Citizens' Movement	Claudia Gonzalez Santos	29	1.35%	0 / 10
National Regeneration Movement	Cesar de la Garza Herrera	189	8.83%	2 / 10
Valid votes			2141 (98.17%)	
Blank vote/Spoilt vote/Protest vote/Write-in candidate			40 (1.83%)	
Turnout			72.75%	
Abstention			27.25%	
Total votes			2181	
PREP-Electoral Institute of Coahuila

==== Sabinas ====
Sabinas Municipality
Party	Candidate	Votes		Seats
National Action Party	Cristina Reyna Murillo	232	0.73%	0 / 20
Institutional Revolutionary Party	Zulmma Guerrero Cazares	8872	27.93%	3 / 20
Party of the Democratic Revolution	Zulmma Guerrero Cazares	1407	4.43%	1 / 20
Ecologist Green Party of Mexico	Feliciano Diaz Iribarren	12440	39.16%	13 / 20
Labor Party	Elizabeth Fernandez Camacho	935	2.94%	0 / 20
Democratic Unity of Coahuila	Zulmma Guerrero Cazares	2057	6.48%	1 / 20
Citizens' Movement	Remberto Hernandez	1752	5.52%	1 / 20
National Regeneration Movement	Elizabeth Fernandez Camacho	4071	12.82%	1 / 20
Non-Partisan	Tristan de la Cruz	540	0.26%	0 / 18
Valid votes			31766 (95.05%)	
Blank vote/Spoilt vote/Protest vote/Write-in candidate			1115 (3.34%)	
Turnout			63.37%	
Abstention			36.63%	
Total votes			33421	
PREP-Electoral Institute of Coahuila

==== San Juan de Sabinas ====
San Juan de Sabinas Municipality
Party	Candidate	Votes		Seats
National Action Party	Marcelino Buendia Rosas	124	0.56%	0 / 14
Institutional Revolutionary Party	Oscar Rios Ramirez	8128	36.64%	9 / 14
Party of the Democratic Revolution	Oscar Rios Ramirez	1055	4.76%	0 / 14
Ecologist Green Party of Mexico	Roberto Gonzalez Ortiz	90	0.41%	0 / 14
Labor Party	Jesus Z'Cruz de la Garza	7013	31.62%	3 / 14
Democratic Unity of Coahuila	Oscar Rios Ramirez	96	0.43%	0 / 14
Citizens' Movement	David Carabaza Guerrero	269	1.21%	0 / 14
National Regeneration Movement	Mario Lopez Gamez	5407	24.38%	2 / 14
Valid votes			22182 (97.94%)	
Blank vote/Spoilt vote/Protest vote/Write-in candidate			467 (2.06%)	
Turnout			64.73%	
Abstention			35.27%	
Total votes			22649	
PREP-Electoral Institute of Coahuila

=== Desert region ===
==== Cuatrocienegas ====
Cuatrocienegas Municipality
Party	Candidate	Votes		Seats
National Action Party	Victor Leija Vega	3879	59.20%	7 / 10
Institutional Revolutionary Party	Manuel Villarreal Cortez	2104	32.11%	3 / 10
Party of the Democratic Revolution	Manuel Villarreal Cortez	158	2.41%	0 / 10
Labor Party	Heron Cabello Hinojosa	74	1.13%	0 / 10
Democratic Unity of Coahuila	Manuel Villarreal Cortez	37	0.56%	0 / 14
Citizens' Movement	Olga Rotunno Aguayo	65	0.99%	0 / 10
National Regeneration Movement	Heron Cabello Hinojosa	235	3.59%	1 / 10
Valid votes			6552 (96.61%)	
Blank vote/Spoilt vote/Protest vote/Write-in candidate			230 (3.39%)	
Turnout			70.15%	
Abstention			29.85%	
Total votes			6782	
PREP-Electoral Institute of Coahuila

==== Lamadrid ====
Lamadrid Municipality
Party	Candidate	Votes		Seats
National Action Party	Jesus Palma Hernandez	458	34.96%	2 / 10
Institutional Revolutionary Party	Magdalena Ortiz Pizarro	657	50.15%	7 / 10
Party of the Democratic Revolution	Magdalena Ortiz Pizarro	9	0.69%	0 / 10
Ecologist Green Party of Mexico	Anais Gonzalez Martinez	98	7.48%	1 / 10
Labor Party	Norma Rodriguez Garcia	35	2.67%	0 / 10
Democratic Unity of Coahuila	Magdalena Ortiz Pizarro	5	0.38%	0 / 14
Citizens' Movement	Johana Rodriguez Ramos	7	0.53%	0 / 10
National Regeneration Movement	Norma Rodriguez Garcia	41	3.13%	0 / 10
Valid votes			1310 (97.69%)	
Blank vote/Spoilt vote/Protest vote/Write-in candidate			31 (2.31%)	
Turnout			81.42%	
Abstention			18.58%	
Total votes			1341	
PREP-Electoral Institute of Coahuila

==== Nadadores ====
Nadadores Municipality
Party	Candidate	Votes		Seats
National Action Party	Martin Cervantes Moreno	601	16.47%	1 / 10
Institutional Revolutionary Party	Maria Alejandra Huerta Aleman	1690	46.30%	7 / 10
Party of the Democratic Revolution	Maria Alejandra Huerta Aleman	72	1.97%	0 / 10
Ecologist Green Party of Mexico	Guillermina Sandoval Ramirez	402	11.01%	1 / 14
Labor Party	Norma Villarreal Reyes	138	3.78%	0 / 10
Democratic Unity of Coahuila	Maria Alejandra Huerta Aleman	20	0.55%	0 / 14
Citizens' Movement	Gloria Rios Sanchez	55	1.51%	0 / 10
National Regeneration Movement	Norma Villarreal Reyes	672	18.41%	2 / 10
Valid votes			3650 (97.05%)	
Blank vote/Spoilt vote/Protest vote/Write-in candidate			111 (2.95%)	
Turnout			73.40%	
Abstention			26.60%	
Total votes			3761	
PREP-Electoral Institute of Coahuila

==== Ocampo ====
Ocampo Municipality
Party	Candidate	Votes		Seats
National Action Party	Maria Francisca Vazquez Rodriguez	692	17.21%	1 / 10
Institutional Revolutionary Party	Adriana Valdez Lopez	1840	45.75%	7 / 10
Party of the Democratic Revolution	Adriana Valdez Lopez	74	1.84%	0 / 10
Labor Party	Dora Alicia Peña Muñiz	466	11.59%	0 / 10
Democratic Unity of Coahuila	Adriana Valdez Lopez	78	1.94%	0 / 10
Citizens' Movement	Karla Perez Gutierrez	16	0.40%	0 / 10
National Regeneration Movement	Dora Alicia Peña Muñiz	856	21.28%	2 / 10
Valid votes			4022 (97.53%)	
Blank vote/Spoilt vote/Protest vote/Write-in candidate			102 (2.47%)	
Turnout			57.78%	
Abstention			42.22%	
Total votes			4124	
PREP-Electoral Institute of Coahuila

==== Sacramento ====
Sacramento Municipality
Party	Candidate	Votes		Seats
National Action Party	Laura Montejano Romo	6	0.34%	0 / 10
Institutional Revolutionary Party	Wendolin Ovalle Reyna	992	56.43%	7 / 10
Party of the Democratic Revolution	Wendolin Ovalle Reyna	8	0.46%	0 / 10
Labor Party	Yajaira Reyna Ramos	67	3.81%	0 / 10
Democratic Unity of Coahuila	Wendolin Ovalle Reyna	5	0.28%	0 / 10
Citizens' Movement	Jaime Moreno Navarro	527	29.98%	2 / 10
National Regeneration Movement	Yajaira Reyna Ramos	153	8.70%	1 / 10
Valid votes			1758 (97.99%)	
Blank vote/Spoilt vote/Protest vote/Write-in candidate			36 (2.01%)	
Turnout			86.37%	
Abstention			13.63%	
Total votes			1794	
PREP-Electoral Institute of Coahuila

==== San Buenaventura ====
San Buenaventura Municipality
Party	Candidate	Votes		Seats
National Action Party	Rosa Guajardo Hernandez	659	5.15%	1 / 14
Institutional Revolutionary Party	Hugo Ivan Lozano	7241	56.60%	9 / 14
Party of the Democratic Revolution	Hugo Lozano Sanchez	192	1.50%	0 / 14
Labor Party	Nicthe Molina Soto	654	5.11%	1 / 10
Democratic Unity of Coahuila	Hugo Ivan Lozano	118	0.92%	0 / 14
Citizens' Movement	Denisse Davila Espinoza	112	0.88%	0 / 14
National Regeneration Movement	Nicthe Molina Soto	3817	29.84%	3 / 14
Valid votes			12793 (98.22%)	
Blank vote/Spoilt vote/Protest vote/Write-in candidate			232 (1.78%)	
Turnout			66.44%	
Abstention			33.56%	
Total votes			13025	
PREP-Electoral Institute of Coahuila

==== Sierra Mojada ====
Sierra Mojada Municipality
Party	Candidate	Votes		Seats
National Action Party	Esven Licon Lujan	431	20.52%	2 / 10
Institutional Revolutionary Party	Elias Portillo Vasquez	979	46.62%	7 / 10
Party of the Democratic Revolution	Elias Portillo Vasquez	21	1.00%	0 / 10
Labor Party	Edgar Tavarez Olivas	416	19.81%	1 / 10
Democratic Unity of Coahuila	Elias Portillo Vasquez	7	0.33%	0 / 10
Citizens' Movement	Berenise Arreola Arreola	77	3.67%	0 / 10
National Regeneration Movement	Edgar Tavarez Olivas	169	8.05%	0 / 10
Valid votes			2100 (97.54%)	
Blank vote/Spoilt vote/Protest vote/Write-in candidate			53 (2.46%)	
Turnout			59.41%	
Abstention			40.59%	
Total votes			2153	
PREP-Electoral Institute of Coahuila

=== Central Region ===
==== Abasolo ====
Abasolo Municipality
Party	Candidate	Votes		Seats
Institutional Revolutionary Party	Yolanda Garcia Valdez	512	47.28%	7 / 10
Party of the Democratic Revolution	Yolanda Garcia Valdez	38	3.51%	0 / 10
Ecologist Green Party of Mexico	Martha Galaviz Alvarado	1	0.09% 4.91%	0 / 10
Labor Party	Ramiro Reyes Rodriguez	50	4.62%	1 / 10
Democratic Unity of Coahuila	Yolanda Garcia Valdez	5	0.46%	0 / 10
National Regeneration Movement	Ramiro Reyes Rodriguez	477	44.04%	2 / 10
Valid votes			1083 (98.54%)	
Blank vote/Spoilt vote/Protest vote/Write-in candidate			16 (1.46%)	
Turnout			82.26%	
Abstention			17.74%	
Total votes			1099	
PREP-Electoral Institute of Coahuila

==== Candela ====
Candela Municipality
Party	Candidate	Votes		Seats
National Action Party	Adriana Perales Perches	16	1.15%	0 / 10
Institutional Revolutionary Party	Fernando Juarez Santos	730	52.59%	7 / 10
Party of the Democratic Revolution	Fernando Juarez Santos	18	1.30%	0 / 10
Labor Party	Angelica Cazares Robles	35	2.52%	0 / 10
Democratic Unity of Coahuila	Fernando Juarez Santos	6	0.43%	0 / 10
Citizens' Movement	Roberto Tijerina Menchaca	545	39.27%	3 / 10
National Regeneration Movement	Angelica Cazares Robles	38	2.74%	0 / 10
Valid votes			1388 (97.00%)	
Blank vote/Spoilt vote/Protest vote/Write-in candidate			43 (3.00%)	
Turnout			87.74%	
Abstention			12.26%	
Total votes			1431	
PREP-Electoral Institute of Coahuila

==== Castanos ====
Castanos Municipality
Party	Candidate	Votes		Seats
National Action Party	Patsy Guajardo Garcia	867	6.61%	1 / 14
Institutional Revolutionary Party	Isabel Sifuentes Zamora	5396	41.15%	4 / 14
Party of the Democratic Revolution	Isabel Sifuentes Zamora	308	2.34%	0 / 20
Ecologist Green Party of Mexico	Yanira Hernandez Mendez	5577	4.91%	1 / 20
Labor Party	Ruth Nohemi Lopez Flores	2232	21.48%	1 / 10
Democratic Unity of Coahuila	Isabel Sifuentes Zamora	215	1.63%	0 / 14
Citizens' Movement	Olga Montenegro Llamas	141	1.07%	0 / 14
National Regeneration Movement	Ruth Nohemi Lopez Flores	6014	45.87%	9 / 14
Valid votes			14667 (95.80%)	
Blank vote/Spoilt vote/Protest vote/Write-in candidate			643 (4.20%)	
Turnout			67.56%	
Abstention			32.44%	
Total votes			15310	
PREP-Electoral Institute of Coahuila

==== Escobedo ====
Escobedo Municipality
Party	Candidate	Votes		Seats
National Action Party	Alicia Perez Rodriguez	2	0.11%	0 / 10
Institutional Revolutionary Party	Daniela Duran Soto	771	40.69%	7 / 10
Party of the Democratic Revolution	Daniela Duran Soto	40	2.11%	0 / 10
Ecologist Green Party of Mexico	Marcelo Amador Cantu	39	2.06%	0 / 10
Labor Party	Sara Chavez Govea	79	4.17%	0 / 10
Democratic Unity of Coahuila	Daniela Duran Soto	7	0.37%	0 / 10
Citizens' Movement	Pedro Govea Montoya	473	24.96%	1 / 10
National Regeneration Movement	Sara Chavez Govea	484	25.54%	2 / 10
Valid votes			1895 (98.60%)	
Blank vote/Spoilt vote/Protest vote/Write-in candidate			27 (1.40%)	
Turnout			74.76%	
Abstention			25.54%	
Total votes			1922	
PREP-Electoral Institute of Coahuila

==== Frontera ====
Frontera Municipality
Party	Candidate	Votes		Seats
National Action Party	Guilebaldo Perez Aguilar	1207	3.05%	1 / 20
Institutional Revolutionary Party	Sara Perez Cantu	13447	33.93%	13 / 20
Party of the Democratic Revolution	Sara Perez Cantu	435	1.10%	0 / 20
Ecologist Green Party of Mexico	Griselda Tovar Heredia	676	1.71%	0 / 20
Labor Party	Javier Castillo Perez	12552	31.67%	4 / 20
Democratic Unity of Coahuila	Sara Perez Cantu	166	0.42%	0 / 20
Citizens' Movement	Juan Escobedo Barboza	683	1.72%	0 / 20
National Regeneration Movement	Roberto Piña Amaya	10466	26.41%	2 / 20
Valid votes			39632 (97.60%)	
Blank vote/Spoilt vote/Protest vote/Write-in candidate			976 (2.40%)	
Turnout			63.86%	
Abstention			36.14%	
Total votes			40608	
PREP-Electoral Institute of Coahuila

==== Monclova ====
Monclova Municipality
Party	Candidate	Votes		Seats
National Action Party	Mario Davila Delgado	13951	12.28%	2 / 20
Institutional Revolutionary Party	Carlos Villarreal Perez	57913	50.97%	13 / 20
Party of the Democratic Revolution	Carlos Villarreal Perez	4347	3.83%	0 / 20
Ecologist Green Party of Mexico	Cesar Flores Sosa	5577	4.91%	1 / 20
Labor Party	Claudia Garza del Toro	3110	2.74%	1 / 20
Democratic Unity of Coahuila	Carlos Villarreal Perez	684	0.60%	0 / 20
Citizens' Movement	Elizabeth Felan Gonzalez	1457	1.28%	0 / 20
National Regeneration Movement	Claudia Garza del Toro	26590	23.40%	3 / 20
Valid votes			113629 (97.27%)	
Blank vote/Spoilt vote/Protest vote/Write-in candidate			3194 (2.73%)	
Turnout			64.59%	
Abstention			35.41%	
Total votes			116823	
PREP-Electoral Institute of Coahuila

=== La Laguna Region ===
==== Francisco I. Madero ====
Francisco I. Madero Municipality
Party	Candidate	Votes		Seats
National Action Party	Rosa Maribel Coronado Martinez	273	0.87%	0 / 20
Institutional Revolutionary Party	Patricia Quistian Contreras	11273	35.86%	6 / 20
Party of the Democratic Revolution	Patricia Quistian Contreras	2303	7.33%	1 / 20
Ecologist Green Party of Mexico	Teresa Meraz Garcia	615	1.96%	0 / 20
Labor Party	Felix Ramirez Hernandez	2371	7.54%	0 / 20
Democratic Unity of Coahuila	Patricia Quistian Contreras	598	1.90%	0 / 20
Citizens' Movement	Enrique Chavez Garcia	760	2.42%	0 / 20
National Regeneration Movement	Felix Ramirez Hernandez	13239	42.12%	13 / 20
Valid votes			31432	
Blank vote/Spoilt vote/Protest vote/Write-in candidate			1215 (3.72%)	
Turnout			71.19%	
Abstention			28.81%	
Total votes			32647	
PREP-Electoral Institute of Coahuila

==== Matamoros ====
Matamoros Municipality
Party	Candidate	Votes		Seats
National Action Party	Oscar Guerrero Rodriguez	710	1.17%	0 / 20
Institutional Revolutionary Party	Miguel Angel Ramirez Lopez	27468	45.28%	13 / 20
Party of the Democratic Revolution	Miguel Angel Ramirez Lopez	2582	4.26%	0 / 20
Ecologist Green Party of Mexico	Jose Luis Medina Cervantes	1331	2.19%	0 / 20
Labor Party	Azalea Huitron Ramirez	2448	4.04%	1 / 20
Democratic Unity of Coahuila	Miguel Angel Ramirez Lopez	670	1.10%	0 / 20
Citizens' Movement	Rosa Gallegos Mendez	735	1.21%	0 / 20
National Regeneration Movement	Azalea Huitron Ramirez	24715	40.74%	6 / 20
Valid votes			60659 (96.16%)	
Blank vote/Spoilt vote/Protest vote/Write-in candidate			2421 (3.84%)	
Turnout			71.90%	
Abstention			28.10%	
Total votes			63080	
PREP-Electoral Institute of Coahuila

==== San Pedro de las Colonias ====
San Pedro de las Colonias Municipality
Party	Candidate	Votes		Seats
National Action Party	Elizabeth Sanchez Niño	481	1.08%	0 / 20
Institutional Revolutionary Party	Brenda Guereca Hernandez	15604	35.18%	13 / 20
Party of the Democratic Revolution	Brenda Guereca Hernandez	2839	6.40%	0 / 20
Ecologist Green Party of Mexico	Patricia Grado Falcon	10551	23.79%	2 / 20
Labor Party	Edgar Sanchez Garza	1160	2.62%	0 / 20
Democratic Unity of Coahuila	Brenda Guereca Hernandez	1621	3.65%	0 / 20
Citizens' Movement	Luz Marmolejo Salinas	283	0.64%	0 / 20
National Regeneration Movement	Edgar Sanchez Garza	11819	26.64%	3 / 20
Non-Partisan	Julio Corpus	7000	15.78%	2 / 20
Valid votes			44358 (82.60%)	
Blank vote/Spoilt vote/Protest vote/Write-in candidate			2344 (4.36%)	
Turnout			70.72%	
Abstention			29.28%	
Total votes			53702	
PREP-Electoral Institute of Coahuila

==== Torreon ====
Torreon Municipality
Party	Candidate	Votes		Seats
National Action Party	Sergio Lara Galvan	19473	5.39%	1 / 20
Institutional Revolutionary Party	Roman Alberto Cepeda	166412	46.08%	13 / 20
Party of the Democratic Revolution	Roman Alberto Cepeda	6466	1.79%	0 / 20
Ecologist Green Party of Mexico	Ignacio Corona Rodriguez	9974	2.76%	0 / 20
Labor Party	Shamir Fernandez Hernandez	21663	6.00%	1 / 10
Democratic Unity of Coahuila	Roman Alberto Cepeda	2260	0.63%	0 / 20
Citizens' Movement	Jorge Torres Bernal	7723	2.14%	0 / 20
National Regeneration Movement	Shamir Fernandez Hernandez	127176	35.21%	5 / 20
Valid votes			361147 (96.24%)	
Blank vote/Spoilt vote/Protest vote/Write-in candidate			14111 (3.76%)	
Turnout			68.17%	
Abstention			31.83%	
Total votes			375258	
PREP-Electoral Institute of Coahuila

==== Viesca ====
Viesca Municipality
Party	Candidate	Votes		Seats
National Action Party	Patricia Solis Ortiz	50	0.46%	0 / 10
Institutional Revolutionary Party	Hilario Escobedo de la Paz	4907	45.12%	5 / 14
Party of the Democratic Revolution	Hilario Escobedo de la Paz	76	0.70%	0 / 14
Ecologist Green Party of Mexico	Meissy Escobedo Mota	111	1.02%	0 / 14
Labor Party	Jorge Velez Sandoval	922	8.48%	0 / 14
Democratic Unity of Coahuila	Hilario Escobedo de la Paz	46	0.42%	0 / 14
Citizens' Movement	Leslie Aguilar Guardado	91	0.84%	0 / 14
National Regeneration Movement	Jorge Velez Sandoval	4673	42.97%	9 / 14
Valid votes			10876 (96.64%)	
Blank vote/Spoilt vote/Protest vote/Write-in candidate			378 (3.36%)	
Turnout			72.75%	
Abstention			27.25%	
Total votes			11254	
PREP-Electoral Institute of Coahuila

=== Southeastern Region ===
==== Arteaga ====
Arteaga Municipality
Party	Candidate	Votes		Seats
National Action Party	Felipe Duran Figueroa	1483	12.08%	1 / 14
Institutional Revolutionary Party	Ana Karen Sanchez Flores	7700	62.74%	9 / 14
Party of the Democratic Revolution	Ana Karen Sanchez Flores	68	0.55%	0 / 14
Ecologist Green Party of Mexico	Alejandro Villarreal Mauri	142	1.15%	0 / 14
Labor Party	Jorge Renteria Campa	201	0.56%	0 / 20
Democratic Unity of Coahuila	Ana Karen Sanchez Flores	66	0.53%	0 / 14
Citizens' Movement	Fidel Valdes Cruz	148	1.20%	0 / 14
National Regeneration Movement	Jorge Renteria Campa	1894	15.43%	4 / 14
Valid votes			15094 (96.74%)	
Blank vote/Spoilt vote/Protest vote/Write-in candidate			508 (3.26%)	
Turnout			73.23%	
Abstention			26.77%	
Total votes			15602	
PREP-Electoral Institute of Coahuila

==== General Cepeda ====
General Cepeda Municipality
Party	Candidate	Votes		Seats
National Action Party	Pablo Salas Aguirre	2656	36.07%	4 / 14
Institutional Revolutionary Party	Mayra Ramos de Zamora	3976	54.00%	9 / 14
Party of the Democratic Revolution	Mayra Ramos de Zamora	116	1.58%	0 / 14
Labor Party	Antonieta Ramos Cantu	169	2.30%	0 / 14
Democratic Unity of Coahuila	Mayra Ramos de Zamora	57	0.77%	0 / 14
National Regeneration Movement	Antonieta Ramos Cantu	389	5.28%	1 / 14
Valid votes			7363 (95.64%)	
Blank vote/Spoilt vote/Protest vote/Write-in candidate			335 (4.35%)	
Turnout			78.43%	
Abstention			21.57%	
Total votes			7699	
PREP-Electoral Institute of Coahuila

==== Parras ====
Parras Municipality
Party	Candidate	Votes		Seats
National Action Party	Claudia Aleman Cortes	257	1.21%	0 / 14
Institutional Revolutionary Party	Fernando Orozco Lara	9261	43.59%	9 / 14
Party of the Democratic Revolution	Fernando Orozco Lara	201	0.95%	0 / 14
Ecologist Green Party of Mexico	Armando Ortiz Zamora	605	2.85%	0 / 14
Labor Party	Jose Antonio Luna Serrano	2019	9.50%	1 / 14
Democratic Unity of Coahuila	Fernando Orozco Lara	157	0.74%	0 / 20
Citizens' Movement	Isidro Miguel Cruz	1128	5.31%	1 / 14
National Regeneration Movement	Karla Mireya Orta Rangel	7618	35.86%	3 / 14
Valid votes			21246	
Blank vote/Spoilt vote/Protest vote/Write-in candidate			987 (4.44%)	
Turnout			63.84%	
Abstention			36.16%	
Total votes			22233 (95.56%)	
PREP-Electoral Institute of Coahuila

==== Ramos Arizpe ====
Ramos Arizpe Municipality
Party	Candidate	Votes		Seats
National Action Party	Juan Ozuna Garcia	1782	3.80%	1 / 20
Institutional Revolutionary Party	Tomas Gutierrez Merino	21080	44.99%	13 / 20
Party of the Democratic Revolution	Tomas Gutierrez Merino	829	1.77%	0 / 20
Ecologist Green Party of Mexico	Areli Flores Oyervides	5490	11.72%	2 / 20
Labor Party	Gerardo Covarrubias Chavez	2497	5.33%	1 / 20
Democratic Unity of Coahuila	Tomas Gutierrez Merino	518	1.11%	0 / 20
Citizens' Movement	Cristina Victoria Palma	1008	2.15%	0 / 20
National Regeneration Movement	Gerardo Covarrubias Chavez	13653	29.14%	3 / 20
Valid votes			46857	
Blank vote/Spoilt vote/Protest vote/Write-in candidate			1526 (3.15%)	
Turnout			57.37%	
Abstention			42.63%	
Total votes			48383	
PREP-Electoral Institute of Coahuila

==== Saltillo ====
Saltillo Municipality
Party	Candidate	Votes		Seats
National Action Party	Amal Esper Serur	14723	3.71%	1 / 20
Institutional Revolutionary Party	Javier Diaz Gonzalez	172158	43.41%	13 / 20
Party of the Democratic Revolution	Javier Diaz Gonzalez	4990	1.26%	0 / 20
Ecologist Green Party of Mexico	Elisa Villalobos Hernandez	8419	2.12%	0 / 20
Labor Party	Diana Hernandez Aguilar	7707	1.94%	0 / 20
Democratic Unity of Coahuila	Javier Diaz Gonzalez	2772	0.70%	0 / 20
Citizens' Movement	Mitchell Marquez de Luna	37265	9.40%	1 / 20
National Regeneration Movement	Alejandra Salazar Mejorado	148529	37.45%	5 / 20
Valid votes			396563 (96.34%)	
Blank vote/Spoilt vote/Protest vote/Write-in candidate			15056 (3.66%)	
Turnout			62.61%	
Abstention			37.39%	
Total votes			411619	
PREP-Electoral Institute of Coahuila

== See also ==
- 2024 Mexican local elections
