= 1st federal electoral district of Coahuila =

Federal electoral district of Mexico

Coahuila's 1st
- Electoral district of the Chamber of Deputies of Mexico

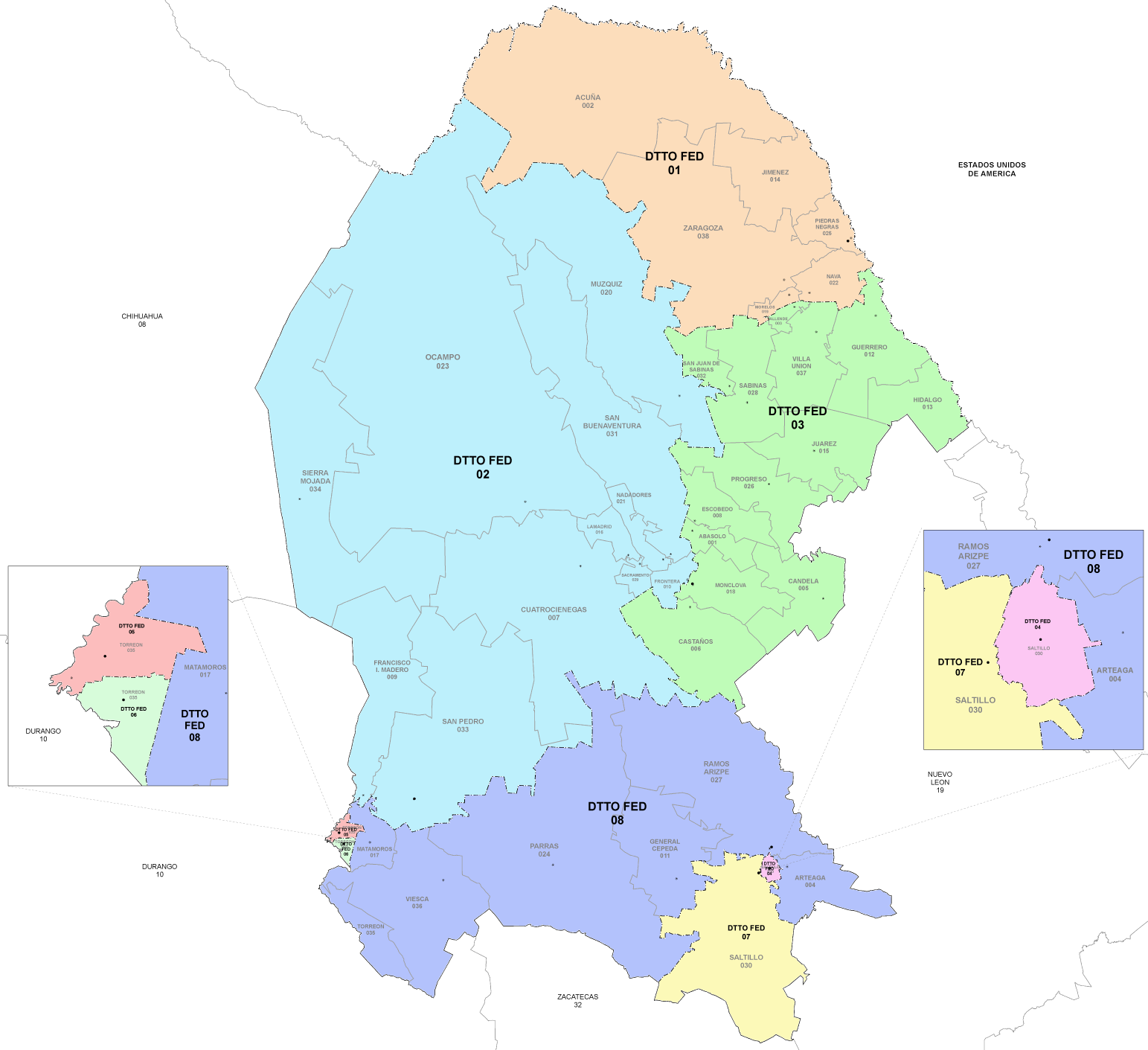
- 1st district since 2022

Incumbent
- Member: Brígido Moreno Hernández
- Party: ▌Labour Party
- Congress: 66th (2024–2027)

District
- State: Coahuila
- Head town: Piedras Negras
- Coordinates: 28°40′N 100°40′W
- Covers: Acuña, Jiménez, Morelos, Nava, Piedras Negras, Zaragoza
- PR region: Second
- Precincts: 206
- Population: 403,123 (2020 census)

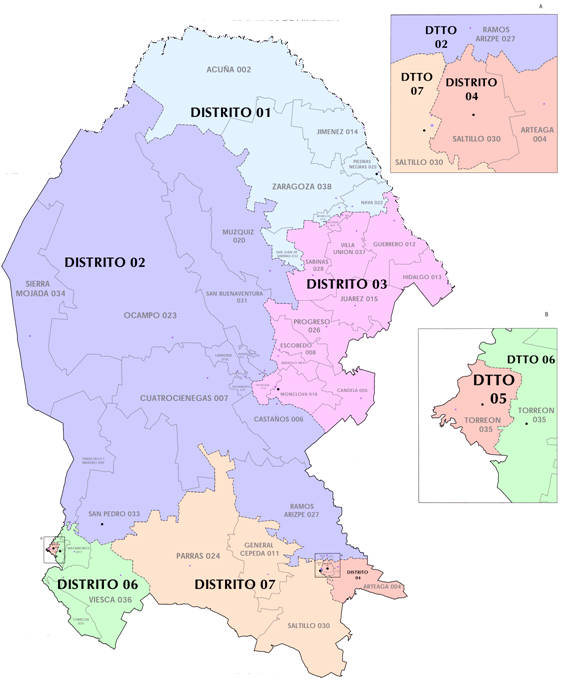
Coahuila under the 2017–2022 districting plan

The 1st federal electoral district of Coahuila (Spanish: Distrito electoral federal 01 de Coahuila) is one of the 300 electoral districts into which Mexico is divided for elections to the federal Chamber of Deputies and one of eight such districts in the state of Coahuila.

It elects one deputy to the lower house of Congress for each three-year legislative session by means of the first past the post system. Votes cast in the district also count towards the calculation of proportional representation ("plurinominal") deputies elected from the second region.

The current member for the district, re-elected in the 2024 general election, is Brígido Ramiro Moreno Hernández of the Labour Party (PT).

== District territory ==
In its 2023 districting plan, which is to be used for the 2024, 2027 and 2030 federal elections, the National Electoral Institute (INE) assigned Coahuila an additional district. The reconfigured 1st district comprises 206 electoral precincts (secciones electorales) across six municipalities in the state's extreme north:

- Acuña, Jiménez, Morelos, Nava, Piedras Negras and Zaragoza.

The head town (cabecera distrital), where results from individual polling stations are gathered together and tallied, is the city of Piedras Negras. The district reported a population of 403,123 in the 2020 census.

== Previous districting schemes ==
Evolution of electoral district numbers
	1974	1978	1996	2005	2017	2023
Coahuila	4	7	7	7	7	8
Chamber of Deputies	196	300				

2017–2022

Between 2017 and 2022, the district covered seven of the state's northern municipalities: the six included in the 2023 plan, plus San Juan de Sabinas. The head town was at Piedras Negras.

2005–2017

Under the 2005 districting scheme, the district covered 10 northern municipalities: Acuña, Allende, Guerrero, Hidalgo, Jiménez, Morelos, Nava, Piedras Negras, Villa Unión and Zaragoza. The head town was the city of Piedras Negras.

1996–2005

Between 1996 and 2005, the 1st district's territory was in the north and north-east region of the state and covered 11 municipalities: Acuña, Allende, Guerrero, Hidalgo, Jiménez, Morelos, Múzquiz, Nava, Piedras Negras, Villa Unión and Zaragoza. The head town was at Piedras Negras.

1978–1996

The districting scheme in force from 1978 to 1996 was the result of the 1977 electoral reforms, which increased the number of single-member seats in the Chamber of Deputies from 196 to 300. Under that plan, Coahuila's seat allocation rose from 4 to 7. The 1st district had its head town at Saltillo and it covered that city.

== Deputies returned to Congress ==
(Mexico) National parties
- Current
- PAN
- PRI
- PT
- PVEM
- MC
- Morena
- PAZ
- Somos
- Defunct or local only
- PLM
- PNR
- PRM
- PNM
- PP
- PPS
- PARM
- PFCRN
- CON
- PANAL
- PSD
- PES
- PES
- PRD

Coahuila's 1st district
Election	Deputy	Party	Term	Legislature
1916	Manuel Aguirre Berlanga		1916–1917	Constituent Congress of Querétaro
1917	Serapio Aguirre	PLC	1917–1918	27th Congress
1918	Ernesto Meade Fierro		1918–1920	28th Congress
1920	Miguel Alessio Robles	Laborist Party (Mexico)	1920–1922	29th Congress
1922	Lorenzo Dávila	Laborist Party (Mexico)	1922–1924	30th Congress
1924	Jacobo Cárdenas	Laborist Party (Mexico)	1924–1926	31st Congress
1926	Juan L. Morales	Laborist Party (Mexico)	1926–1928	32nd Congress
1928	Rómulo Moreira	Laborist Party (Mexico)	1928–1930	33rd Congress
1930	Ricardo Ainslie R.	Institutional Revolutionary Party	1930–1932	34th Congress
1932	Ricardo Ainslie R.	Institutional Revolutionary Party	1932–1934	35th Congress
1934	Jesús Govea T.		1934–1937	36th Congress
1937	Tomás Garza Felán	Institutional Revolutionary Party	1937–1940	37th Congress
1940	Pedro Cerda		1940–1943	38th Congress
1943	Francisco López Serrano	Institutional Revolutionary Party	1943–1946	39th Congress
1946	Federico Berrueto Ramón	Institutional Revolutionary Party	1946–1949	40th Congress
1949	Evelio González Treviño	Institutional Revolutionary Party	1949–1952	41st Congress
1952	Rafael Carranza Hernández	Institutional Revolutionary Party	1952–1955	42nd Congress
1955	Carlos Valdés Villarreal	Institutional Revolutionary Party	1955–1958	43rd Congress
1958	Florencio Barrera Fuentes	Institutional Revolutionary Party	1958–1961	44th Congress
1961	Salvador González Lobo	Institutional Revolutionary Party	1961–1964	45th Congress
1964	Tomás Algaba Gómez	Institutional Revolutionary Party	1964–1967	46th Congress
1967	José de las Fuentes Rodríguez	Institutional Revolutionary Party	1967–1970	47th Congress
1970	Gustavo Guerra Castaños	Institutional Revolutionary Party	1970–1973	48th Congress
1973	Jesús Roberto Dávila Narro	Institutional Revolutionary Party	1973–1976	49th Congress
1976	José de las Fuentes Rodríguez	Institutional Revolutionary Party	1976–1979	50th Congress
1979	Jorge Masso Masso	Institutional Revolutionary Party	1979–1982	51st Congress
1982	Abraham Cepeda Izaguirre	Institutional Revolutionary Party	1982–1985	52nd Congress
1985	Eliseo Mendoza Berrueto (Note: Mendoza Berrueto took leave of his seat to assume office as the governor of Coahuila.); Hilda Aurelia Lozano Flores	Institutional Revolutionary Party	1985–1987; 1987–1988	53rd Congress
1988	Enrique Martínez y Martínez	Institutional Revolutionary Party	1988–1991	54th Congress
1991	Óscar Pimentel González	Institutional Revolutionary Party	1991–1994	55th Congress
1994	Alejandro Gutiérrez Gutiérrez	Institutional Revolutionary Party	1994–1997	56th Congress
1997	Francisco García Castells	Institutional Revolutionary Party	1997–2000	57th Congress
2000	Claudio Bres Garza (Note: Bres Garza took leave of his seat on 17 July 2002 to assume office as municipal president of Piedras Negras.); Armín Valdés Torres	Institutional Revolutionary Party	2000–2002; 2002–2003	58th Congress
2003	Jesús María Ramón Valdés	Institutional Revolutionary Party	2003–2006	59th Congress
2006	Ángel Humberto García Reyes	National Action Party (Mexico)	2006–2009	60th Congress
2009	Francisco Saracho Navarro	Institutional Revolutionary Party	2009–2012	61st Congress
2012	Irma Elizondo Ramírez (Note: Elizondo Ramírez died in office on 4 August 2014.); María de Lourdes Flores Treviño	Institutional Revolutionary Party	2012–2014; 2014–2015	62nd Congress
2015	Francisco Saracho Navarro	Institutional Revolutionary Party	2015–2018	63rd Congress
2018	Lenin Pérez Rivera (Note: Pérez Rivera sat as a member of the PAN until March 2020 and as an independent thereafter.)	National Action Party (Mexico) Independent politician	2018–2021	64th Congress
2021	Brígido Ramiro Moreno Hernández	Labour Party (Mexico)	2021–2024	65th Congress
2024	Brígido Ramiro Moreno Hernández	Labour Party (Mexico)	2024–2027	66th Congress

== Presidential elections ==
Coahuila's 1st district
Election	District won by	Party or coalition	%
2018	Andrés Manuel López Obrador	Juntos Haremos Historia	46.6003
2024	Claudia Sheinbaum Pardo	Sigamos Haciendo Historia	56.4507
