= UTC−05:00 =

Time zone

- Time zone
- World map with the time zone highlighted

UTC offset
- UTC: UTC−05:00

Current time
- :: UTC−05:00 [refresh]

Central meridian
- 75 degrees W

Date-time group
- R

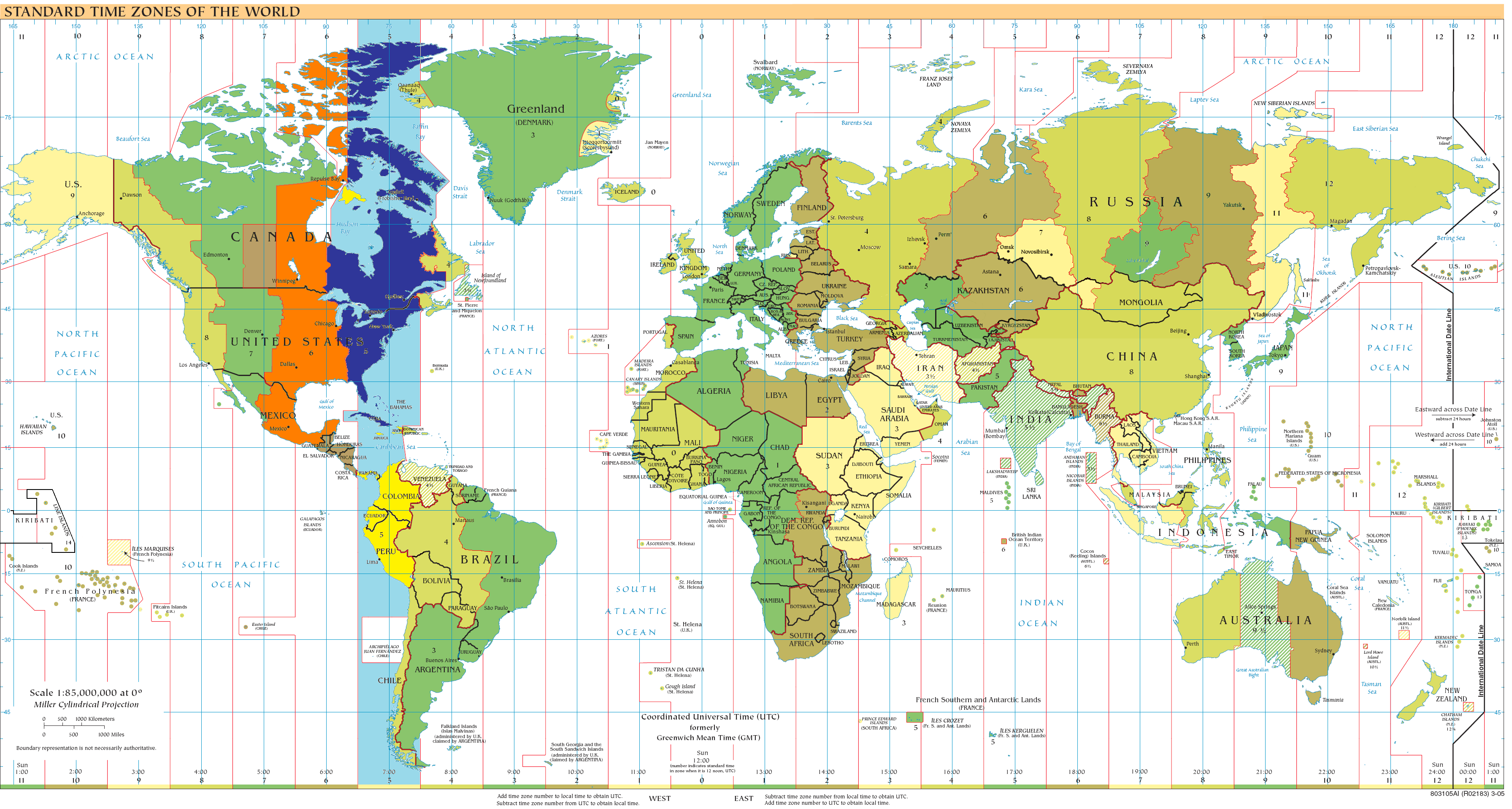
UTC−05:00: blue (January), orange (July), yellow (year-round), light blue (sea areas)

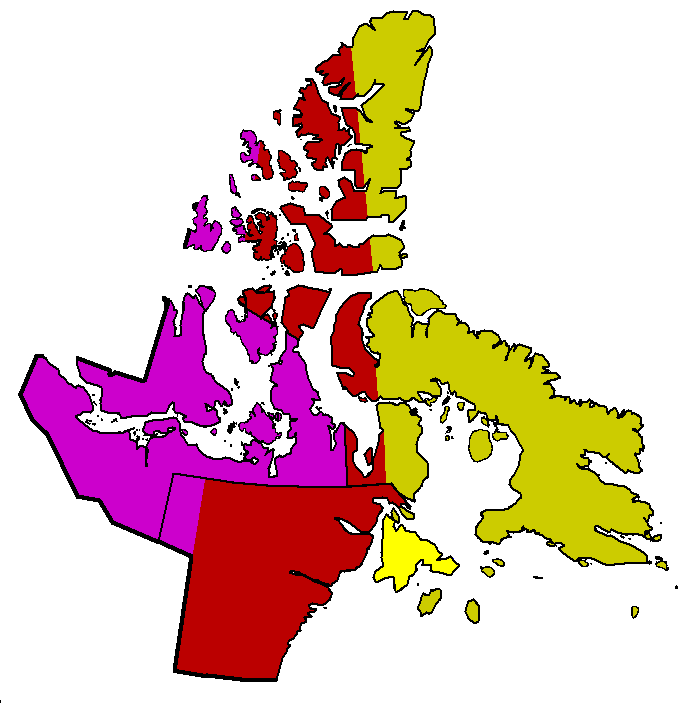
Time in Nunavut: Standard / DST; GMT−05:00 / GMT−04:00 / Eastern Time; GMT−05:00 (year round) / / Eastern Time; GMT−06:00 / GMT−05:00 / Central Time; GMT−07:00 / GMT−06:00 / Mountain Time

Time in Indiana Counties grouped by time zone. Lake Michigan shown in blue at top left.: / Standard / DST / US time zone; Red / UTC−06:00 / UTC−05:00 / Central Time; Yellow / UTC−05:00 / UTC−04:00 / Eastern Time

Time in Mexico: Mexican time zone / Standard / DST / U.S. equivalent; Zona Sureste / UTC−05:00 / / Eastern Standard Time; Zona Centro / UTC−06:00 / UTC−05:00 / Central Time; Zona Centro / UTC−06:00 / / Central Standard Time; Zona Pacífico / UTC−07:00 / UTC−06:00 / Mountain Time; Zona Pacífico / UTC−07:00 / / Mountain Standard Time; Zona Noroeste / UTC−08:00 / UTC−07:00 / Pacific Time

Time in Brazil, since 25 April 2019 Time in Brazil: ACT / Acre Time / UTC−5 / (BRT–2); AMT / Amazon Time / UTC−4 / (BRT−1); BRT / Brasília Time / UTC−3 / (BRT); FNT / Fernando de Noronha Time / UTC−2 / (BRT+1)

UTC−05:00 is an identifier for a time offset from UTC of −05:00. In North America, it is observed in the Eastern Time Zone during standard time and in the Central Time Zone (Spanish: Zona Centro) during the other eight months (see Daylight saving time). The western Caribbean uses it year round.

== As standard time (Northern Hemisphere winter) ==
Principal cities: New York, Washington, Philadelphia, Boston, Atlanta, Miami, Detroit, Columbus, Baltimore, Cleveland, Pittsburgh, Indianapolis, Orlando, Charlotte, Charleston, Wilmington, Key West, Toronto, Montreal, Ottawa, Quebec City, Iqaluit, Nassau, Havana, Port-au-Prince, Cockburn Town, Providenciales

=== North America ===
- Canada (Eastern Time Zone)
  - Nunavut
    - Qikiqtaaluk Region except Resolute
  - Ontario
    - Most of province (east of 90° W)
  - Quebec
    - Most of province except easternmost area
- United States (Eastern Time Zone)
  - Delaware
  - District of Columbia
  - Florida
    - Entire state except the counties of Bay, Calhoun, Escambia, Holmes, Jackson, Okaloosa, Santa Rosa, Walton, and Washington, and northern Gulf county (panhandle)
  - Georgia
  - Indiana
    - Except the northwestern counties of Jasper, Lake, LaPorte, Newton, Porter and Starke, and the southwestern counties of Gibson, Perry, Posey, Spencer, Vanderburgh and Warrick
  - Kentucky
    - Counties to the east of (not including) the counties of Breckinridge, Grayson, Hart, Green, Adair, Russell and Clinton
  - Maine
  - Maryland
  - Michigan
    - Except the western counties of Dickinson, Gogebic, Iron and Menominee
  - New England (states of Connecticut, Massachusetts, Maine, New Hampshire, Rhode Island and Vermont)
  - New Jersey
  - New York
  - North Carolina
  - Ohio
  - Pennsylvania
  - South Carolina
  - Tennessee
    - The counties of Scott, Morgan, Roane, Rhea and Hamilton, and all counties to the east of these
  - Virginia
  - West Virginia

=== Caribbean ===
- Bahamas
- Cuba
- Haiti
- Navassa Island
- United Kingdom
  - Turks and Caicos Islands

== As daylight saving time (Northern Hemisphere summer) ==
Principal cities: Chicago, Dallas, Houston, St. Louis, Minneapolis, Austin, Memphis, Kansas City, San Antonio, Nashville, New Orleans, Milwaukee, Oklahoma City, Reynosa

=== North America ===
- Canada (Central Time Zone)
  - Nunavut
    - All of Kivalliq Region (Coral Harbour)
  - Ontario
    - West of 90° W
- Mexico (near US border with Texas)
  - Chihuahua
    - The municipalities of Coyame del Sotol, Ojinaga and Manuel Benavides
  - Coahuila de Zaragoza
    - The municipalities of Acuña, Allende, Guerrero, Hidalgo, Jiménez, Morelos, Nava, Ocampo, Piedras Negras, Villa Unión and Zaragoza
  - Nuevo León
    - The municipality of Anahuac
  - Tamaulipas
    - The municipalities of Nuevo Laredo, Guerrero, Mier, Miguel Alemán, Camargo, Gustavo Díaz Ordaz, Reynosa, Río Bravo, Valle Hermoso and Matamoros
- United States (Central Time Zone)
  - Alabama
    - entire state except Phenix City
  - Arkansas
  - Florida
    - The counties of Bay, Calhoun, Escambia, Holmes, Jackson, Okaloosa, Santa Rosa, Walton, and Washington, and northern Gulf county (panhandle)
  - Illinois
  - Indiana
    - Northwestern counties of Jasper, Lake, LaPorte, Newton, Porter and Starke
    - Southwestern counties of Gibson, Perry, Posey, Spencer, Vanderburgh and Warrick
  - Iowa
  - Kansas
    - Entire state except westernmost counties
  - Kentucky
    - The counties of Breckinridge, Grayson, Hart, Green, Adair, Russell and Clinton, and all counties to the west of these
  - Louisiana
  - Michigan
    - The western counties of Dickinson, Gogebic, Iron and Menominee
  - Minnesota
  - Mississippi
  - Missouri
  - Nebraska
    - Central and eastern Nebraska
  - North Dakota
    - Entire state except southwest
  - Oklahoma
    - Entire state except Kenton
  - South Dakota
    - Eastern half
  - Tennessee
    - Counties to the west of the counties of Scott, Morgan, Roane, Rhea, and Hamilton
  - Texas
    - All except westernmost counties
  - Wisconsin

== As standard time (year-round) ==
Principal cities: Winnipeg, Cancún, Bogotá, Lima, Kingston, Quito, Panama City, George Town

=== North America ===
- Canada – Eastern Time Zone
  - Nunavut
    - Southampton Island
  - Manitoba
  - Ontario
    - Atikokan and New Osnaburgh/Pickle Lake area
- Mexico (Zona Sureste)
  - Quintana Roo
- Panama

=== South America ===
- Brazil
  - Acre
  - Amazonas (13 western municipalities, approximately marked by a line between Tabatinga and Porto Acre)
- Colombia – Time in Colombia
- Ecuador – Time in Ecuador (except Galápagos Islands)
- Peru – Time in Peru

=== Caribbean ===
- Jamaica – Time in Jamaica
- United Kingdom
  - British Overseas Territories
    - Cayman Islands
- United States
  - United States Minor Outlying Islands
    - Navassa Island

== As daylight saving time (Southern Hemisphere summer) ==
Principal settlement: Hanga Roa

=== East Pacific ===
- Chile
  - Easter Island

== See also ==
- Central Daylight Time
- Eastern Standard Time
- List of places using UTC−05:00
- Time in Brazil
- Time in Canada
- Time in Chile
- Time in Colombia
- Time in Ecuador
- Time in Mexico
- Time in Panama
- Time in Peru
- Time in the United States
- Time in Belize
