= UTC−06:00 =

Time zone

- Time zone
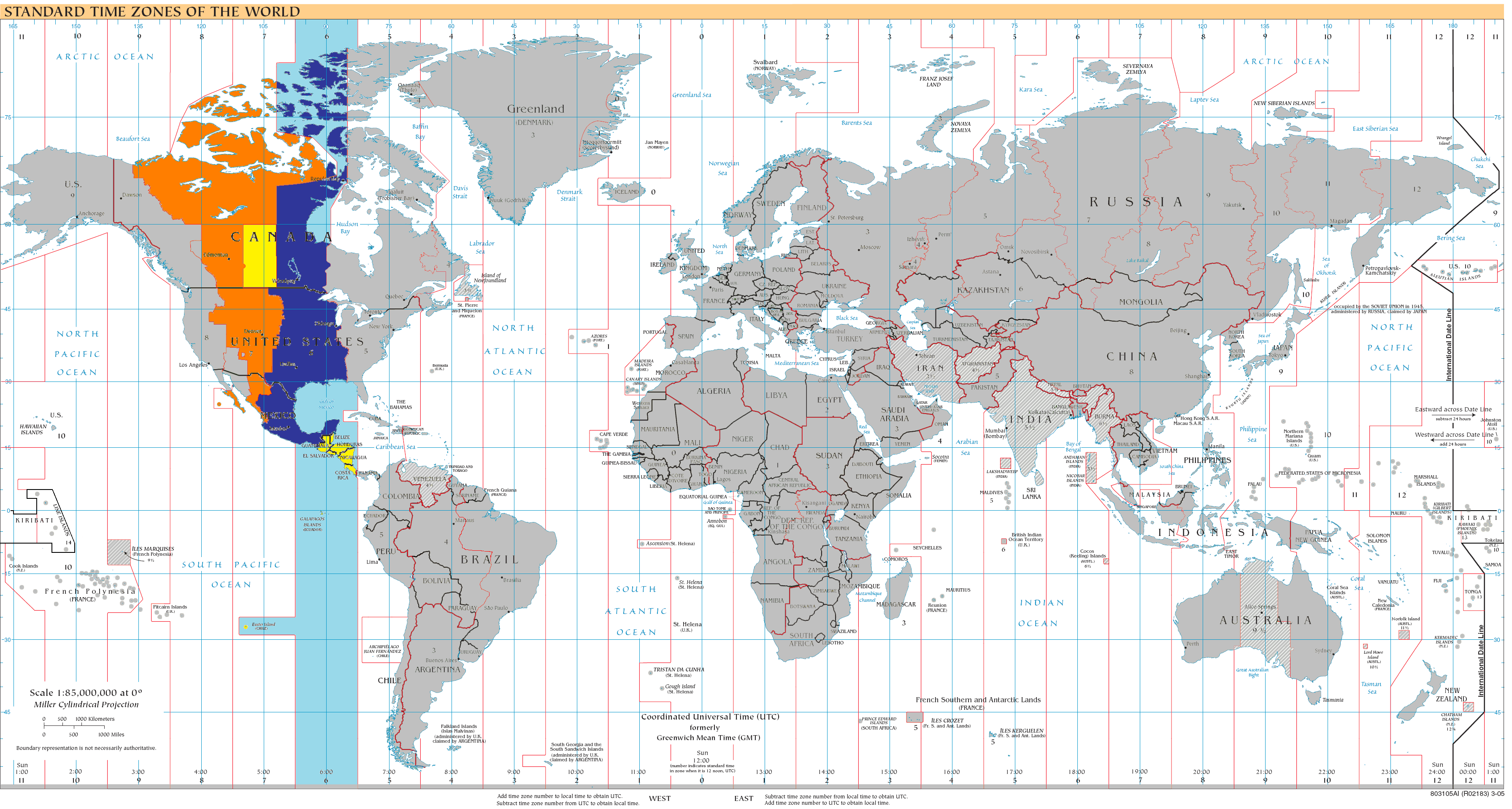
- World map with the time zone highlighted

UTC offset
- UTC: UTC−06:00

Current time
- :: UTC−06:00 [refresh]

Central meridian
- 90 degrees W

Date-time group
- S

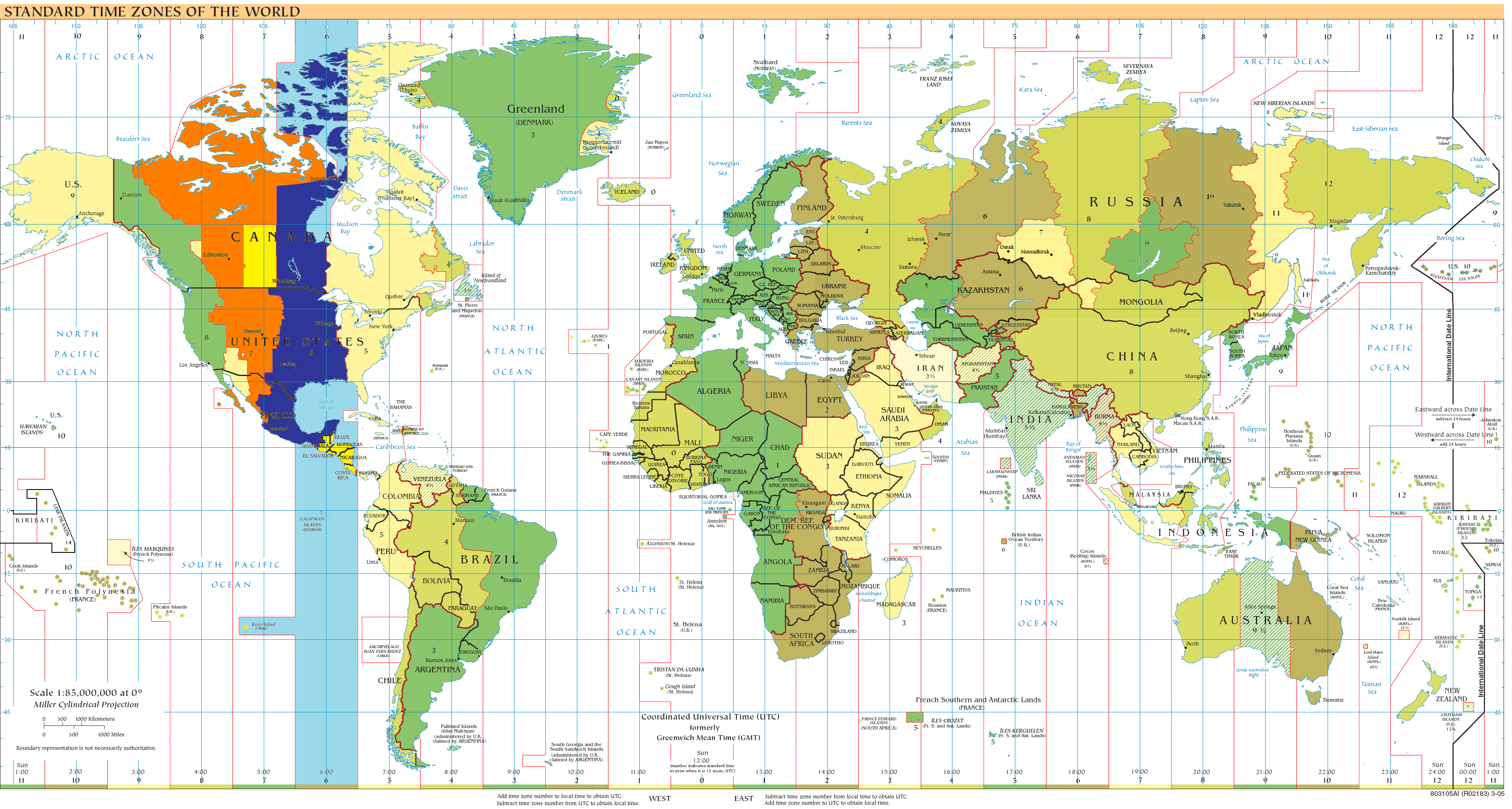
UTC−06:00: blue (January), orange (July), yellow (year-round), light blue (sea areas)

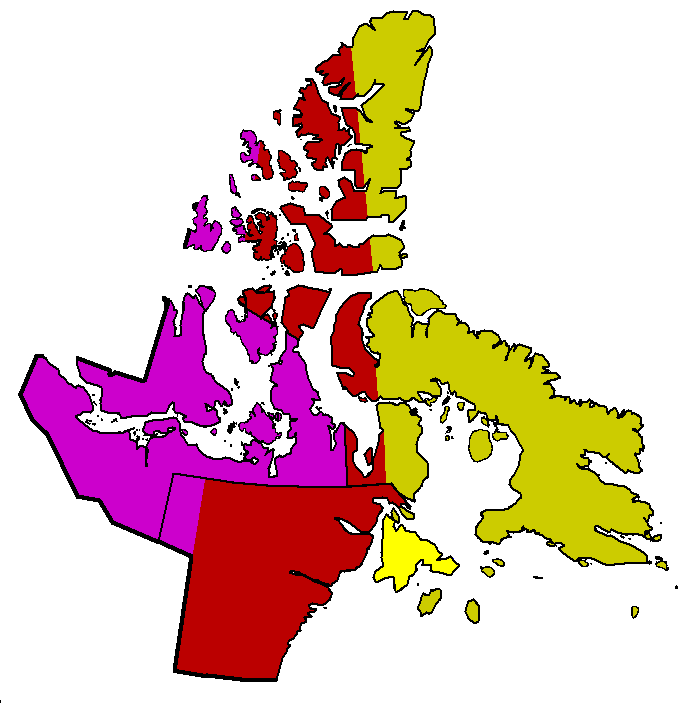
Time in Nunavut: Standard / DST; GMT−05:00 / GMT−04:00 / Eastern Time; GMT−05:00 (year round) / / Eastern Time; GMT−06:00 / GMT−05:00 / Central Time; GMT−07:00 / GMT−06:00 / Mountain Time

Time in Indiana Counties grouped by time zone. Lake Michigan shown in blue at top left.: / Standard / DST / US time zone; Red / UTC−06:00 / UTC−05:00 / Central Time; Yellow / UTC−05:00 / UTC−04:00 / Eastern Time

Time in Mexico: Mexican time zone / Standard / DST / U.S. equivalent; Zona Sureste / UTC−05:00 / / Eastern Standard Time; Zona Centro / UTC−06:00 / UTC−05:00 / Central Time; Zona Centro / UTC−06:00 / / Central Standard Time; Zona Pacífico / UTC−07:00 / UTC−06:00 / Mountain Time; Zona Pacífico / UTC−07:00 / / Mountain Standard Time; Zona Noroeste / UTC−08:00 / UTC−07:00 / Pacific Time

UTC−06:00 is an identifier for a time offset from UTC of −06:00. In North America, it is observed in the Central Time Zone (Spanish: Zona Centro) during standard time and in the Mountain Time Zone (French: Heure des Rocheuses) during the other eight months (see daylight saving time). Several Latin American countries and a few other places use it year-round.

== As standard time (Northern Hemisphere winter) ==
Principal cities: Chicago, Dallas, Houston, St. Louis, Minneapolis, Austin, Memphis, Kansas City, San Antonio, Nashville, New Orleans, Milwaukee, Oklahoma City, Reynosa

=== North America ===
CST is standard time in the 6th time zone west of Greenwich, centralized by the 90th meridian; used in North America in some parts of Canada, Mexico and the United States.

- Canada (Central Time Zone)
  - Nunavut
    - Kivalliq Region except Southampton Island (Coral Harbour)
  - Ontario
    - West of 90° west
- Mexico (near US border with Texas)
  - Chihuahua
    - The municipalities of Coyame del Sotol, Ojinaga and Manuel Benavides
  - Coahuila de Zaragoza
    - The municipalities of Acuña, Allende, Guerrero, Hidalgo, Jiménez, Morelos, Nava, Ocampo, Piedras Negras, Villa Unión and Zaragoza
  - Nuevo León
    - The municipality of Anahuac
  - Tamaulipas
    - The municipalities of Nuevo Laredo, Guerrero, Mier, Miguel Alemán, Camargo, Gustavo Díaz Ordaz, Reynosa, Río Bravo, Valle Hermoso and Matamoros
- United States (Central Time Zone)
  - Alabama
    - The city of Phenix City uses both UTC−05:00 and UTC−06:00 due to its proximity to Columbus, Georgia
  - Arkansas
  - Florida
    - The counties of Bay, Calhoun, Escambia, Holmes, Jackson, Okaloosa, Santa Rosa, Walton, and Washington, and northern Gulf County (panhandle)
  - Illinois
  - Indiana
    - Northwestern counties of Jasper, Lake, LaPorte, Newton, Porter and Starke
    - Southwestern counties of Gibson, Perry, Posey, Spencer, Vanderburgh and Warrick
  - Iowa
  - Kansas
    - Entire state except Greeley, Hamilton, Sherman and Wallace counties
  - Kentucky
    - The counties of Breckinridge, Grayson, Hart, Green, Adair, Russell and Clinton, and all counties to the west of these
  - Louisiana
  - Michigan
    - The western counties of Dickinson, Gogebic, Iron and Menominee
  - Minnesota
  - Mississippi
  - Missouri
  - Nebraska
    - Central and eastern Nebraska
  - North Dakota
    - Entire state except southwest
  - Oklahoma
    - Entire state except Kenton
  - South Dakota
    - Eastern half
  - Tennessee
    - Counties to the west of the counties of Scott, Morgan, Roane, Rhea, and Hamilton
  - Texas
    - All except northwestern Culberson, El Paso and Hudspeth counties
  - Wisconsin

== As daylight saving time (Northern Hemisphere summer) ==
Principal cities: Denver, Billings, Boise, Salt Lake City, Albuquerque, El Paso, Ciudad Juárez

=== North America ===
- Canada (Mountain Time Zone)
  - Nunavut
    - Kitikmeot Region
- Mexico (near US border with New Mexico & western Texas)
  - Chihuahua
    - The municipalities of Janos, Ascensión, Juárez, Práxedis G. Guerrero and Guadalupe
- United States (Mountain Time Zone)
  - Arizona - Navajo Nation only
  - Colorado
  - Idaho
    - South of Salmon River
  - Kansas
    - The western counties of Greeley, Hamilton, Sherman and Wallace
  - Montana
  - Nebraska
    - The western counties of Cherry (western part), Hooker, Arthur, Keith, Perkins, Chase and Dundy, and all counties to the west of these
  - Nevada
    - West Wendover
  - New Mexico
  - North Dakota
    - The Southwestern counties of Adams, Billings, Bowman, Dunn (southern part), Golden Valley, Grant, Hettinger, McKenzie (southern part), Sioux (west of ND route 31), Slope and Stark
  - Oklahoma
    - Kenton
  - Oregon
    - Malheur County (except a small strip in the south)
  - South Dakota
    - The western counties of Corson, Dewey, Stanley (western part), Jackson and Bennett, and all counties to the west of these
  - Texas
    - The western counties of Culberson (northwestern part), El Paso and Hudspeth
  - Utah
  - Wyoming

== As standard time (year-round) ==
Principal cities: Yellowknife, Calgary, Edmonton, Regina, Saskatoon, Puebla, Orizaba, Mexico City, Guadalajara, Monterrey, Guatemala City, Tegucigalpa, Managua, Belmopan, Belize City, San José, San Salvador, San Pedro Sula, Liberia.

=== Central America ===
- Belize
- Costa Rica
- El Salvador
- Guatemala
- Honduras
- Nicaragua
  - Called Central America Time Zone

=== North America ===
- Canada (Central Time Zone)
  - British Columbia
    - Regional District of East Kootenay
    - Town of Golden
    - Columbia-Shuswap Regional District
  - Northwest Territories, where it is officially called Northwest Territories Time.
  - Alberta, where it is officially called Alberta Time and formerly known as Mountain Daylight Time.
  - Saskatchewan
- Mexico (Zona Centro)
  - All except Baja California, Baja California Sur, most of Nayarit, Quintana Roo, Sinaloa, Sonora and the northern municipalities of Chihuahua, Coahuila, Nuevo León and Tamaulipas.
  - A small enclave of the UTC−6 time zone is followed in the municipality of Bahía de Banderas, Nayarit, due to its strong economic ties with the neighboring municipality of Puerto Vallarta, Jalisco.

=== Oceania ===
==== East Pacific ====
- Ecuador
  - Galápagos Province

== As standard time (Southern Hemisphere winter) ==
Principal settlement: Hanga Roa

=== Oceania ===
==== East Pacific ====
- Chile
  - Easter Island

== See also ==
- Time in Canada
- Time in Chile
- Time in Ecuador
- Time in Mexico
- Time in the United States
