= Time in Mexico =

Time in Mexico: Mexican time zone / Standard / DST / U.S. equivalent; Zona Sureste / UTC−05:00 / / Eastern Standard Time; Zona Centro / UTC−06:00 / UTC−05:00 / Central Time; Zona Centro / UTC−06:00 / / Central Standard Time; Zona Pacífico / UTC−07:00 / UTC−06:00 / Mountain Time; Zona Pacífico / UTC−07:00 / / Mountain Standard Time; Zona Noroeste / UTC−08:00 / UTC−07:00 / Pacific Time

Mexico uses four time zones:

- UTC−05:00: Zona Sureste (Southeast Zone), comprising the state of Quintana Roo;
- UTC−06:00: Zona Centro (Central Zone), comprising all parts of Mexico not included in the other zones, including Mexico City, Guadalajara, and Monterrey;
- UTC−07:00: Zona Pacífico (Pacific Zone), comprising the states of Baja California Sur, Nayarit (except the municipality of Bahía de Banderas), Sinaloa, Sonora, and northwest border municipalities of Chihuahua (Janos, Ascensión, Juárez, Guadalupe, and Práxedis Gilberto Guerrero)
- UTC−08:00: Zona Noroeste (Northwest Zone), comprising the state of Baja California.

Some municipalities near the U.S. border, (Note: Janos, Ascensión, Juárez, Guadalupe, and Práxedis Gilberto Guerrero in the state of Chihuahua follow U.S. Mountain time) (Note: Coyame del Sotol, Ojinaga, and Manuel Benavides in the state of Chihuahua follow U.S. Central time) (Note: Ocampo, Acuña, Jiménez, Piedras Negras, Zaragoza, Morelos, Allende, Villa Unión, Nava, Guerrero, and Hidalgo, in the state of Coahuila; Anáhuac, in the state of Nuevo León; Nuevo Laredo, Guerrero, Mier, Miguel Alemán, Camargo, Gustavo Díaz Ordaz, Reynosa, Río Bravo, Valle Hermoso, and Matamoros, in the state of Tamaulipas follow U.S. Central time) as well as the entire state of Baja California, observe daylight saving time, setting the time forward one hour on the second Sunday of March at 2:00 and back one hour on the first Sunday of November at 2:00. This is done to maintain the same time as the respective areas across the border in the United States.

Mexican law states that remote islands observe the time zone corresponding to their geographic location. According to this rule, in the Revillagigedo Islands, San Benedicto, Socorro and Roca Partida are in UTC−07:00, and Clarion is in UTC−08:00.

== History ==
=== Early 20th century ===
Standard time was first adopted in Mexico in 1922, under a decree by President Álvaro Obregón establishing two time zones. One time zone based on 105°W (7 hours behind GMT) covered most of the country, from Baja California to Veracruz and Oaxaca. A second time zone based on 90°W (6 hours behind GMT) covered the southeastern part of the country, comprising the states of Chiapas, Tabasco, Campeche, Yucatán, and the territory of Quintana Roo. In 1924, a third time zone based on 120°W (8 hours behind GMT) was established for the northern district of the territory of Baja California (corresponding to the current state of Baja California), and the states of Veracruz and Oaxaca were changed to time zone 90°W (6 hours behind GMT).

In 1927, all areas using time zone 105°W (7 hours behind GMT) were changed to 90°W (6 hours behind GMT), and the northern district of the territory of Baja California was changed to 105°W (7 hours behind GMT). In 1930, the northern district of the territory of Baja California was returned to 120°W (8 hours behind GMT), and the rest of the country was returned to 105°W (7 hours behind GMT), except the eastern portion, comprising the states of Tamaulipas, Veracruz, Oaxaca, Chiapas, Tabasco, Campeche, Yucatán, and the territory of Quintana Roo, which remained in 90°W (6 hours behind GMT). The three time zones were named Hora del Oeste (Western Time), Hora del Centro (Central Time), and Hora del Golfo (Gulf Time), respectively.

In 1931, Mexico observed daylight saving time for the first time. From 30 April to 30 September, the areas in time zones 120°W and 105°W observed 105°W and 90°W (7 and 6 hours behind GMT), respectively, while the areas in time zone 90°W remained observing their standard time all year. This observance was supposed to continue every year from 1 April to 30 September, but it was abandoned in 1932. Instead, the areas in 120°W remained observing their standard time, while the areas in 105°W were permanently changed to 90°W (6 hours behind GMT). Only the Federal District, which corresponds to the current Mexico City, observed daylight saving time in 1939, 1940–1941, 1943–1944, and 1950.

In 1942, the North Territory of Baja California (current Baja California), South Territory of Baja California (current Baja California Sur) and the states of Nayarit, Sinaloa and Sonora were changed to 105°W (7 hours behind GMT), named Hora del Noroeste (Northwest Time). The rest of the country remained in 90°W (6 hours behind GMT), named Hora del Centro (Central Time). The North Territory of Baja California was returned to 120°W (8 hours behind GMT) in 1945, changed again to 105°W in 1948, returned again to 120°W in 1949, and started observing daylight saving time in 1950, following the same changes in the neighboring U.S. state of California.

=== Late 20th century ===
After becoming a state, Baja California continued observing daylight saving time, usually with the same schedule as the U.S. state of California.

In December 1981, for commercial and tourism reasons, the states of Campeche, Yucatán, and Quintana Roo were changed to time zone 75°W (UTC−05:00). Campeche and Yucatán returned to 90°W (UTC−06:00) in November 1982, and Quintana Roo did so in January 1983.

In 1988, the states of Coahuila, Durango, Nuevo León and Tamaulipas observed daylight saving time as an experiment, from the first Sunday in April to the last Sunday in October, the same schedule used in the United States at the time. None of these states continued the practice in the following year.

In 1996, all of Mexico started observing daylight saving time, from the first Sunday in April to the last Sunday in October, matching the U.S. schedule. In 1997, Quintana Roo was changed to 75°W (UTC−05:00) during standard time and 60°W (UTC−04:00) during daylight saving time, but returned to its previous time zone in 1998. Also in 1998, the state of Chihuahua was changed to 105°W (UTC−07:00) during standard time and 90°W (UTC−06:00) during daylight saving time, resulting in its largest city, Juárez, matching the time of neighboring El Paso, Texas, in U.S. Mountain Time. In 1999, the state of Sonora discontinued the observance of daylight saving time, matching most of neighboring Arizona.

=== 21st century ===
In 2001, Mexico experimented with a shorter period of daylight saving time, from the first Sunday in May to the last Sunday in September, except in Baja California, which maintained the U.S. schedule, and Sonora, which did not observe daylight saving time. The government of the Federal District issued a decree attempting to also discontinue observing daylight saving time, but the Supreme Court ruled that only Congress had the power to decide on the subject. As a result, Congress passed a law establishing the time zones and a congressional decree for daylight saving time, both of which had previously been established only by presidential decree. The law named the time zones Zona Centro (Central Zone, UTC−06:00 standard time), Zona Pacífico (Pacific Zone, UTC−07:00 standard time) and Zona Noroeste (Northwest Zone, UTC−08:00 standard time). From 2002, daylight saving time was restored to the previous schedule from the first Sunday in April to the last Sunday in October.

In 2007, the United States extended its daylight saving time schedule to be from the second Sunday in March to the first Sunday in November. The Mexican Congress decided to maintain the existing shorter schedule for Mexico, causing a time difference across the Mexico–United States border during part of the year. The border population complained about the situation, to which Congress responded in 2010 by adopting the U.S. schedule only for Baja California and for municipalities within 20 km of the border, except in Sonora, which had discontinued daylight saving time altogether, while the rest of the country continued using the previous schedule. Also in 2010, the municipality of Bahía de Banderas, in the state of Nayarit, changed to the Central Zone (UTC−06:00 standard time and UTC−05:00 daylight saving time). In 2015, the state of Quintana Roo changed to a new time zone, Zona Sureste (Southeast Zone), and discontinued daylight saving time, being in UTC−05:00 all year.

In October 2022, Congress replaced the entire law on time zones. Daylight saving time was discontinued nationally, except in Baja California and some municipalities near the U.S. border, which continued observing it with the U.S. schedule. At the same time, the entire state of Chihuahua, including areas near the U.S. border, changed to the Central Zone (UTC−06:00 all year). The law also created a procedure for a state to request Congress to change its time zone or its observance of daylight saving time, and in case of a change initiated by Congress, the law required that Congress seek approval from the respective state. In November 2022, following a request by the state of Chihuahua and approval by Congress according to this procedure, the municipalities near the northwest border of the state were returned to UTC−07:00 standard time and UTC−06:00 daylight saving time, matching the time of Juárez with neighboring El Paso, and the municipalities near the northeast border were changed to UTC−06:00 standard time and UTC−05:00 daylight saving time, matching the time of Ojinaga with neighboring Presidio, Texas. Although the text of decree published to make this change specified the time zones incorrectly, the time was changed according to its intent, and Congress planned to correct the text later.

== IANA time zone database ==
Data for Mexico from zone.tab in the IANA time zone database.

c.c.	Coordinates	TZ ID	Areas	UTC offset ±hh:mm		Time zone		Notes	Map
c.c.	Coordinates	TZ ID	Areas	Std.	DST	Std.	DST	Notes	Map
MX	+3232−11701	America/Tijuana	Baja California	−08:00	−07:00	PST	PDT	Follows U.S. DST rules	
MX	+2904−11058	America/Hermosillo	Sonora	−07:00		MST			
MX	+2313−10625	America/Mazatlan	Baja California Sur, Nayarit (most areas), Sinaloa	−07:00		MST			
MX	+3144−10629	America/Ciudad_Juarez	Chihuahua (US border – west)	−07:00	−06:00	MST	MDT	Follows U.S. DST rules	
MX	+2838−10605	America/Chihuahua	Chihuahua (most areas)	−06:00		CST		Moved from Zona Pacifico in 2022.	
MX	+1924−09909	America/Mexico_City	Central Mexico	−06:00		CST			
MX	+2048−10515	America/Bahia_Banderas	Bahía de Banderas	−06:00		CST		Matches Mexico City since 2010	
MX	+2540−10019	America/Monterrey	Durango; Coahuila, Nuevo León, Tamaulipas (most areas)	−06:00		CST		Matches Mexico City since 1999	
MX	+2058−08937	America/Merida	Campeche, Yucatán	−06:00		CST		Matches Mexico City since 1982	
MX	+2934−10425	America/Ojinaga	Chihuahua (US border – east)	−06:00	−05:00	CST	CDT	Moved from Zona Pacifico in 2022. Follows U.S. DST rules	
MX	+2550−09730	America/Matamoros	Coahuila, Nuevo León, Tamaulipas (US border)	−06:00	−05:00	CST	CDT	Follows U.S. DST rules	
MX	+2105−08646	America/Cancun	Quintana Roo	−05:00		EST			

== See also ==
- Effects of time zones on North American broadcasting
