= List of municipalities and counties on the Mexico–United States border =

This is a list of all counties and municipalities (municipios in Spanish) that are directly on the Mexico–United States border. A total of 37 municipalities and 23 counties, spread across 6 Mexican and 4 American states, are located on the border. All entities are listed geographically from west to east.

== Mexico ==
=== Baja California ===
- Tijuana Municipality
- Tecate Municipality
- Mexicali Municipality

=== Sonora ===
- San Luis Río Colorado Municipality
- Puerto Peñasco Municipality
- Plutarco Elías Calles Municipality
- Caborca Municipality
- Altar Municipality
- Sáric Municipality
- Nogales Municipality
- Santa Cruz Municipality
- Cananea Municipality
- Naco Municipality
- Agua Prieta Municipality

=== Chihuahua ===
- Janos Municipality
- Ascensión Municipality
- Juárez Municipality
- Guadalupe Municipality (first occurrence)
- Práxedis G. Guerrero Municipality
- Guadalupe Municipality (second occurrence, since it borders Práxedis G. Guerrero on three sides)
- Ojinaga Municipality
- Manuel Benavides Municipality

=== Coahuila ===
- Ocampo Municipality
- Acuña Municipality
- Jiménez Municipality
- Piedras Negras Municipality
- Guerrero Municipality
- Hidalgo Municipality

=== Nuevo León ===
- Anohuac Municipality

=== Tamaulipas ===
- Nuevo Laredo Municipality
- Guerrero Municipality
- Mier Municipality
- Miguel Alemán Municipality
- Camargo Municipality
- Gustavo Díaz Ordaz Municipality
- Reynosa Municipality
- Río Bravo Municipality
- Matamoros Municipality

== United States ==
Map of U.S. counties on the border

=== California ===
- San Diego County
- Imperial County

=== Arizona ===
- Yuma County
- Pima County
- Santa Cruz County
- Cochise County

=== New Mexico ===
- Hidalgo County
- Luna County
- Doña Ana County

=== Texas ===
- El Paso County
- Hudspeth County
- Jeff Davis County (border at only one point, i.e., border length is zero)
- Presidio County
- Brewster County
- Terrell County
- Val Verde County
- Kinney County
- Maverick County
- Webb County
- Zapata County
- Starr County
- Hidalgo County
- Cameron County

== See also ==
- International border states of the United States#Border with Mexico
