= Municipalities of Coahuila =

List of municipalities of Mexican state

Map of Mexico with Coahuila highlighted

Coahuila is a state in northeast Mexico that is divided into 38 municipalities. According to the 2020 INEGI census, Coahuila is the 15th most populous state with 3,146,771 inhabitants and the third largest by land area spanning 151,846.16 square kilometres (58,628.13 sq mi).

Municipalities in Coahuila are administratively autonomous of the state according to the 115th article of the 1917 Constitution of Mexico. Every three years, citizens elect a municipal president (Spanish: presidente municipal) by a plurality voting system who heads a concurrently elected municipal council (ayuntamiento) responsible for providing all the public services for their constituents. The municipal council consists of a variable number of trustees and councillors (regidores y síndicos). Municipalities are responsible for public services (such as water and sewerage), street lighting, public safety, traffic, and the maintenance of public parks, gardens and cemeteries. They may also assist the state and federal governments in education, emergency fire and medical services, environmental protection and maintenance of monuments and historical landmarks. Since 1984, they have had the power to collect property taxes and user fees, although more funds are obtained from the state and federal governments than from their own income.

The largest municipality by population is the state capital Saltillo, with 879,958 residents, while the smallest is Abasolo with 1,022 residents. The largest municipality by land area in Coahuila and the third largest in Mexico is Ocampo, which spans 26,064.30 km^{2} (10,063.48 sq mi), and the smallest is Allende which spans 252.01 km^{2} (97.30 sq mi). The first municipality to incorporate was Monclova on August 12, 1689, and the newest municipality is Francisco I. Madero, which incorporated December 2, 1936.

== Municipalities ==
Largest municipalities in Coahuila by population

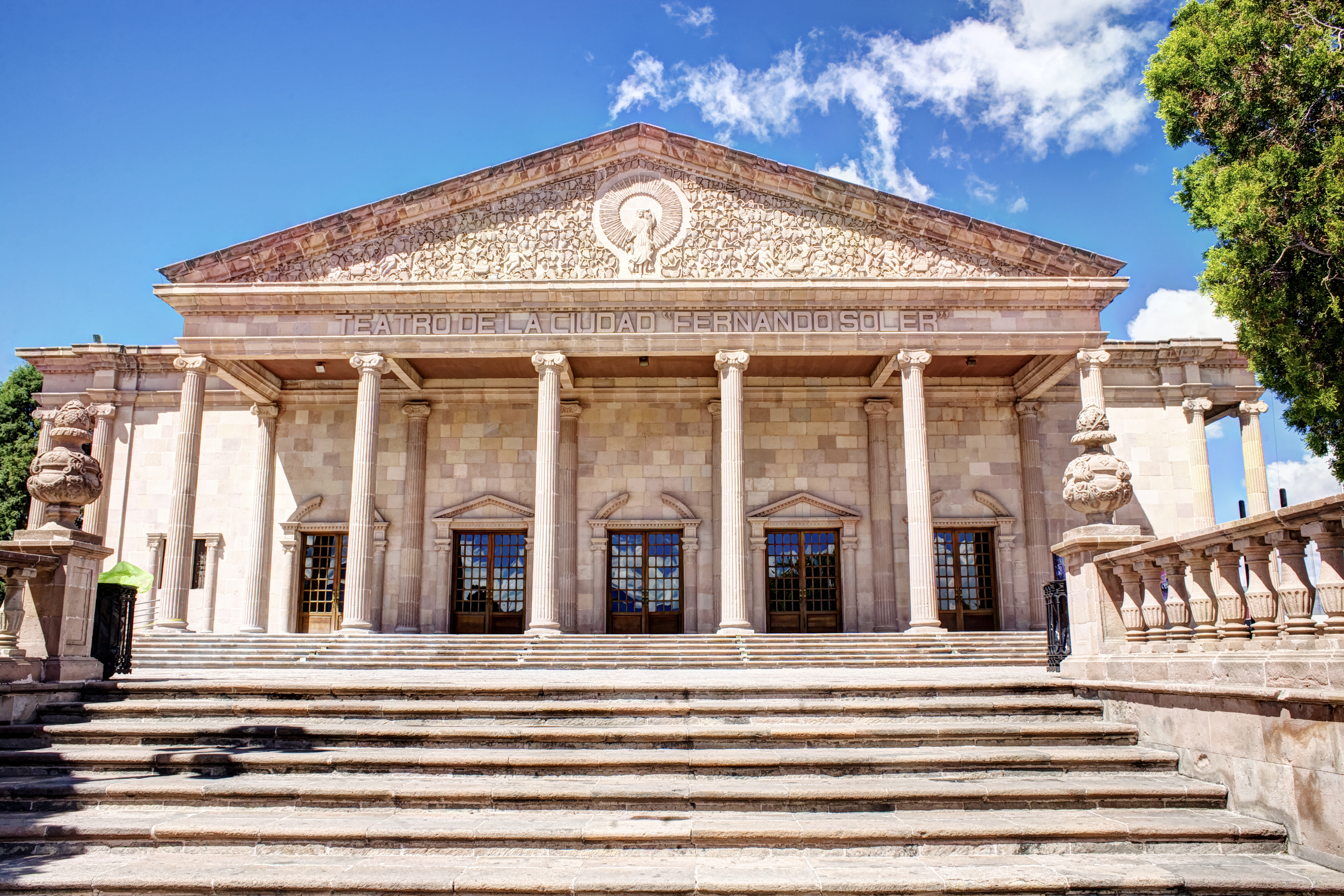
Saltillo, state capital and largest municipality by population in Coahuila.

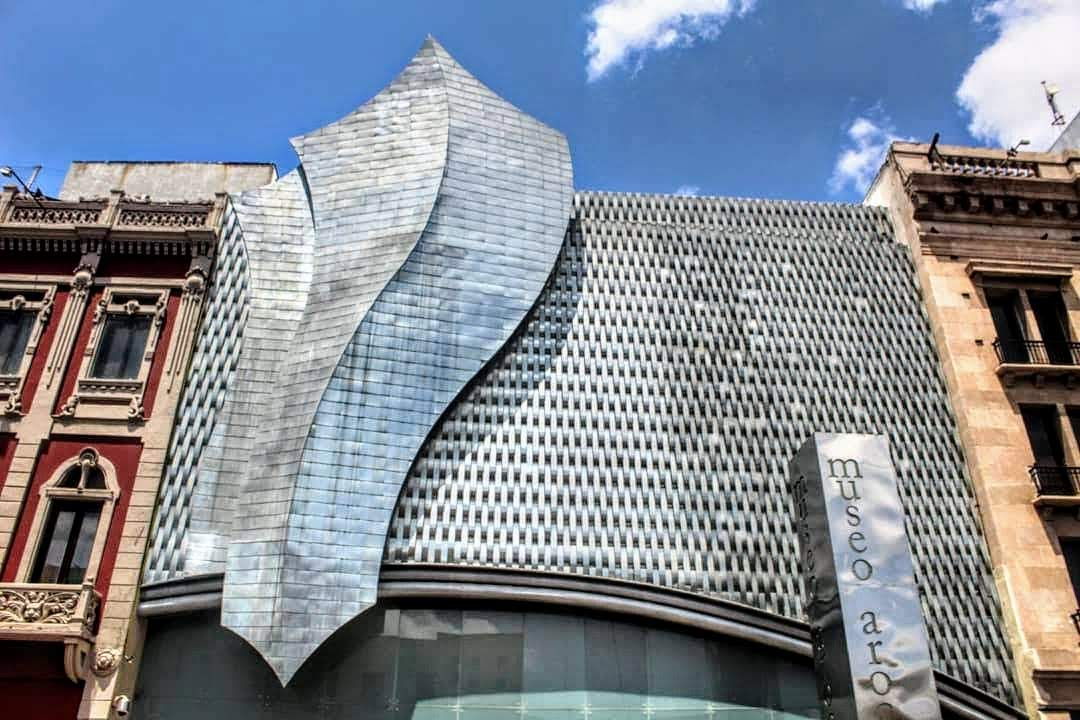
Torreón, second largest municipality by population.

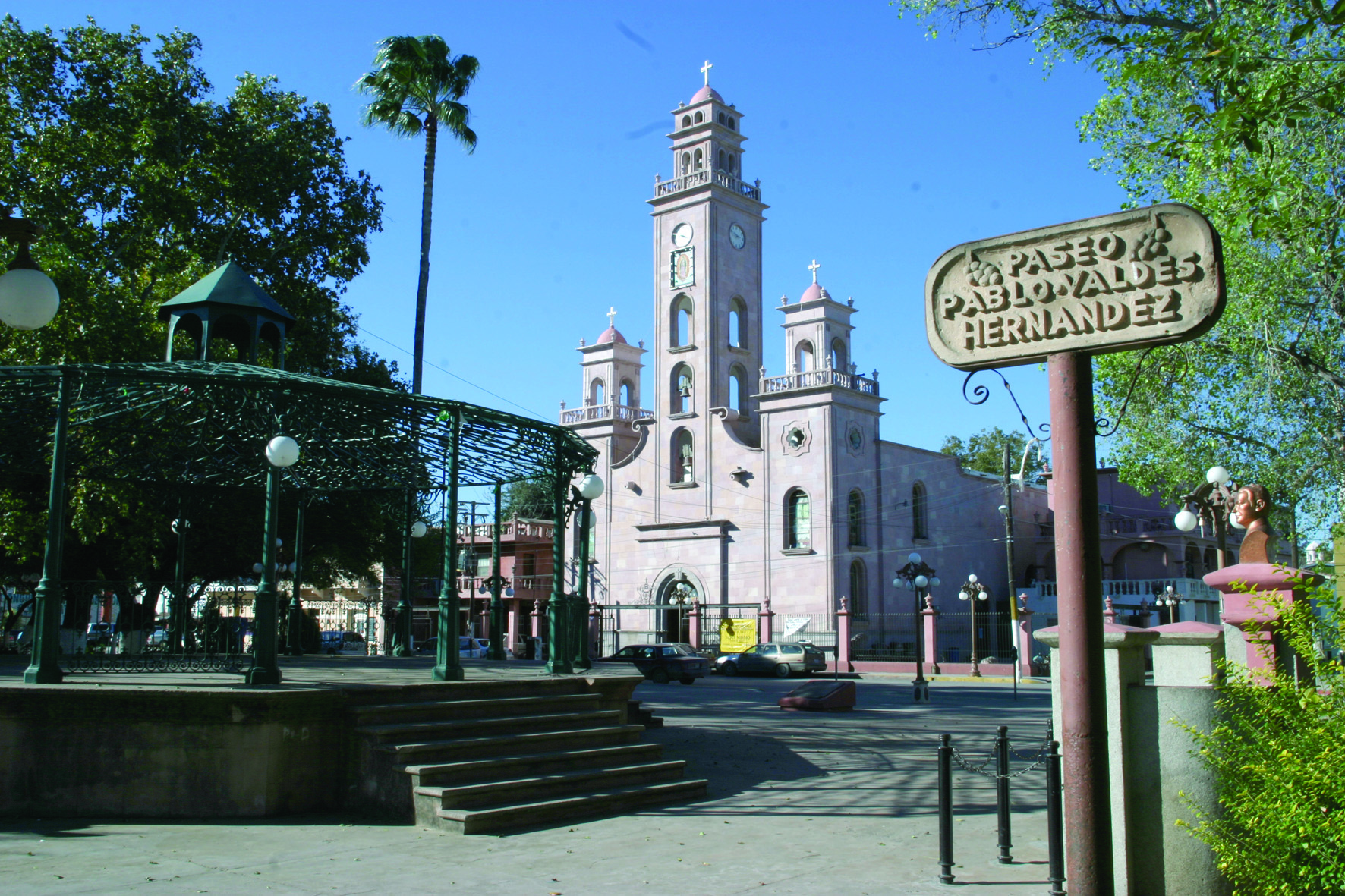
Piedras Negras, the fourth largest municipality by population.

† State capital

Municipalities of Coahuila
Name	Municipal seat	Population (2020)	Population (2010)	Change	Land area		Population density (2020)	Incorporation date
Name	Municipal seat	Population (2020)	Population (2010)	Change	km^{2}	sq mi	Population density (2020)	Incorporation date
Abasolo	Abasolo	1,022	1,070	−4.5%	744.40	287.41	1.4/km^{2} (3.5/sq mi)	November 17, 1827
Acuña	Ciudad Acuña	163,058	136,755	+19.2%	11,478.22	4,431.77	14.2/km^{2} (36.8/sq mi)	February 12, 1890
Allende	Allende	23,056	22,675	+1.7%	252.01	97.30	91.5/km^{2} (237.0/sq mi)	February 3, 1826
Arteaga	Arteaga	29,578	22,544	+31.2%	1,638.66	632.69	18.1/km^{2} (46.7/sq mi)	December 31, 1866
Candela	Candela	1,643	1,808	−9.1%	2,122.52	819.51	0.8/km^{2} (2.0/sq mi)	October 4, 1857
Castaños	Castaños	29,128	25,892	+12.5%	3,349.05	1,293.08	8.7/km^{2} (22.5/sq mi)	February 6, 1877
Cuatrociénegas	Cuatrociénegas de Carranza	12,715	13,013	−2.3%	10,691.19	4,127.89	1.2/km^{2} (3.1/sq mi)	June 11, 1800
Escobedo (Note: Name was changed from Abasolo Nuevo in 1918.)	Escobedo	3,047	2,901	+5.0%	1,026.61	396.38	3.0/km^{2} (7.7/sq mi)	December 2, 1905
Francisco I. Madero	Francisco I. Madero	59,035	55,676	+6.0%	2,815.25	1,086.97	21.0/km^{2} (54.3/sq mi)	December 2, 1936
Frontera	Ciudad Frontera	82,409	75,215	+9.6%	458.25	176.93	179.8/km^{2} (465.8/sq mi)	December 14, 1927
General Cepeda (Note: The Congress of Coahuila changed the municipality's name from Villa de Patos on December 29, 1892.)	General Cepeda	11,898	11,682	+1.8%	2,646.14	1,021.68	4.5/km^{2} (11.6/sq mi)	September 25, 1866
Guerrero (Note: Guerrero was originally incorporated as Río Grande, changing its name on March 18, 1834.)	Guerrero	1,643	2,091	−21.4%	2,931.13	1,131.72	0.6/km^{2} (1.5/sq mi)	March 11, 1827
Hidalgo	Hidalgo	1,735	1,852	−6.3%	1,131.55	436.90	1.5/km^{2} (4.0/sq mi)	August 2, 1886
Jiménez	Jiménez	9,502	9,935	−4.4%	2,203.86	850.92	4.3/km^{2} (11.2/sq mi)	February 13, 1875
Juárez	Juárez	1,584	1,599	−0.9%	2,462.03	950.60	0.6/km^{2} (1.7/sq mi)	December 5, 1874
Lamadrid	Lamadrid	1,764	1,835	−3.9%	674.50	260.43	2.6/km^{2} (6.8/sq mi)	May 13, 1912
Matamoros	Matamoros de la Laguna	118,337	107,160	+10.4%	807.63	311.83	146.5/km^{2} (379.5/sq mi)	August 6, 1869
Monclova	Monclova	237,951	216,206	+10.1%	1,253.69	484.05	189.8/km^{2} (491.6/sq mi)	August 12, 1689
Morelos	Morelos	7,928	8,207	−3.4%	640.09	247.14	12.4/km^{2} (32.1/sq mi)	February 3, 1826
Múzquiz	Santa Rosa de Múzquiz	71,627	66,834	+7.2%	8,300.45	3,204.82	8.6/km^{2} (22.3/sq mi)	January 31, 1850
Nadadores	Nadadores	6,539	6,335	+3.2%	717.77	277.13	9.1/km^{2} (23.6/sq mi)	June 21, 1828
Nava	Nava	33,129	27,928	+18.6%	909.23	351.05	36.4/km^{2} (94.4/sq mi)	June 13, 1827
Ocampo	Ocampo	9,642	10,991	−12.3%	26,064.30	10,063.48	0.4/km^{2} (1.0/sq mi)	July 3, 1890
Parras	Parras de la Fuente	44,472	45,401	−2.0%	10,641.79	4,108.82	4.2/km^{2} (10.8/sq mi)	December 12, 1824
Piedras Negras	Piedras Negras	176,327	152,806	+15.4%	475.08	183.43	371.2/km^{2} (961.3/sq mi)	October 4, 1857
Progreso	Progreso	3,239	3,473	−6.7%	2,891.22	1,116.31	1.1/km^{2} (2.9/sq mi)	November 11, 1860
Ramos Arizpe	Ramos Arizpe	122,243	75,461	+62.0%	6,767.36	2,612.89	18.1/km^{2} (46.8/sq mi)	May 13, 1850
Sabinas	Sabinas	64,811	60,847	+6.5%	1,979.31	764.21	32.7/km^{2} (84.8/sq mi)	January 22, 1906
Sacramento	Sacramento	2,471	2,314	+6.8%	289.86	111.92	8.5/km^{2} (22.1/sq mi)	May 9, 1862
Saltillo†	Saltillo	879,958	725,123	+21.4%	5,631.26	2,174.24	156.3/km^{2} (404.7/sq mi)	March 11, 1827
San Buenaventura	San Buenaventura	24,759	22,149	+11.8%	6,453.08	2,491.55	3.8/km^{2} (9.9/sq mi)	October 4, 1857
San Juan de Sabinas	Nueva Rosita	42,260	41,649	+1.5%	803.63	310.28	52.6/km^{2} (136.2/sq mi)	August 6, 1869
San Pedro de las Colonias	San Pedro de las Colonias	101,041	102,650	−1.6%	7,157.36	2,763.47	14.1/km^{2} (36.6/sq mi)	February 24, 1871
Sierra Mojada	Sierra Mojada	6,744	6,375	+5.8%	7,934.60	3,063.56	0.8/km^{2} (2.2/sq mi)	September 29, 1879
Torreón	Torreón	720,848	639,629	+12.7%	1,285.40	496.29	560.8/km^{2} (1,452.5/sq mi)	February 25, 1893
Viesca	Viesca	20,305	21,319	−4.8%	4,410.76	1,703.01	4.6/km^{2} (11.9/sq mi)	September 21, 1830
Villa Unión	Villa Unión	6,188	6,289	−1.6%	1,857.32	717.12	3.3/km^{2} (8.6/sq mi)	December 28, 1927
Zaragoza (Note: On August 7, 1827, the name of the town was changed from San Fernando to Villa de Rosas, and then to Rosas on October 4, 1857, and finally to Zaragoza on February 27, 1868.)	Zaragoza	13,135	12,702	+3.4%	7,949.58	3,069.35	1.7/km^{2} (4.3/sq mi)	November 15, 1824
Coahuila	—	3,146,771	2,748,391	+14.5%	151,846.16	58,628.13	20.7/km^{2} (53.7/sq mi)	—
Mexico	—	119,938,473	112,336,538	+6.8%	1,972,550	761,606	60.8/km^{2} (157.5/sq mi)	—
