= Hidalgo, Coahuila =

Hidalgo
- Municipal seat
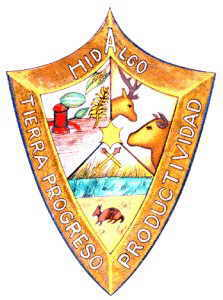
- Coat of arms

- Location in Mexico
- Coordinates: 27°47′28″N 99°52′27″W
- Country: Mexico
- State: Coahuila
- Municipality: Hidalgo

Government
  - President: Conrrado Navarro (Movimiento Ciudadano)
- Elevation: 150 m (490 ft)

Population (2010)
  - Total: 1,638
- Time zone: UTC–06:00 (Zona Centro)
  - Summer (DST): UTC–05:00 (DST)
- Codigo Postal: 26670
- Area code: +52-867
- Nearest Airports: Laredo: Laredo International Airport KLRD LRD Nuevo Laredo: Quetzalcoatl International Airport MMNL NLD

Hidalgo or Villa Hidalgo is a community located in the Mexican state of Coahuila. It is the municipal seat of Hidalgo Municipality. According to the INEGI census of 2010, Hidalgo has a population of 1,638 inhabitants. Its elevation is 150 meters above sea level.
