= Allende, Coahuila =

City in the Mexican state of Coahuila

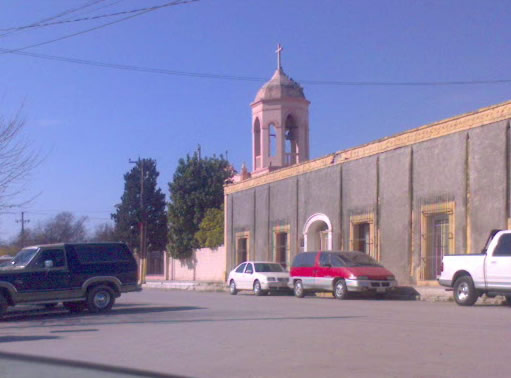
- Nickname: Coah
- Location within Mexico
- Coordinates: 28°20′N 100°50′W
- Country: Mexico
- State: Coahuila
- Municipality: Allende
- Founded: 16 March 1826

Government
  - Mayor: Ricardo Alfonso Treviño Guevara

Area
  - Municipality: 198.70 km^{2} (76.72 sq mi)
- Elevation: 380 m (1,250 ft)

Population (2000)
  - Metro: 20,153 (Municipality)
- Time zone: UTC–06:00 (Zona Centro)
  - Summer (DST): UTC–05:00 (DST)
- Postal code: 26531
- Area code: 862
- Website: www.allendecoahuila.gob.mx

Allende is a city in the Mexican state of Coahuila. The city serves as the administrative center for the surrounding municipality of Allende.

== History ==
The name "Allende" is in honor of Ignacio Allende, a hero of Mexico's War of Independence. The town's folk hero is Arnulfo González who was gunned down in the mid-1920s, and has a "corrido" sung by artists such as Vicente Fernández and many others. Prior to 1832 the settlement was known as San Juan de Mata.

=== Los Zetas Massacre ===
In February, 2014, members of the Army, Navy, State, and Federal Police forces began searching for the remains of at least 300 residents of the region, who had been murdered in 2011 and buried in a series of clandestine graves in local ranches. In the Dallas suburbs, the U.S. Drug Enforcement Administration (DEA) had launched Operation Too Legit to Quit after some surprising busts. In one, police had found $802,000, vacuum-packed and hidden in the gas tank of a pickup. The driver said he worked for a guy he knew only as “El Diablo,” the Devil.

After more arrests, DEA Agent Richard Martinez and Assistant U.S. Attorney Ernest Gonzalez determined that El Diablo was 30-year-old Jose Vasquez, Jr., a Dallas native who’d started selling drugs in high school and was now the leading Zetas cocaine distributor in east Texas, moving truckloads of drugs, guns and money each month. As they prepared to arrest him, Vasquez slipped across the border to Allende, where he sought protection from members of the cartel’s inner circle. But Martinez and Gonzalez saw an opportunity in his escape. If they could persuade Vasquez to cooperate, it would give them rare access to the senior ranks of the notoriously impenetrable cartel and a chance to capture its leaders, particularly the Treviño brothers, who had killed their way onto the list of the DEA’s top targets. Miguel Ángel Treviño was known as Z-40, Omar as Z-42.

What Martinez wanted were the trackable PINs, or personal identification numbers, of the Treviños’ BlackBerry phones. Vasquez had left the agent plenty of leverage. His wife and mother were still living in Texas. The DEA threatened to imprison Vasquez’s mother and wife if he did not get the trackable PINs for the Treviños. Under pressure to get the phones’ PINs, Vasquez turned to Héctor Moreno, a Zeta lieutenant, using a little leverage of his own. It was Moreno’s brother, Gilberto, who had been caught driving the truck with $802,000 in the gas tank. Facing 20 years in prison, Gilberto had confessed that he was working for the Zetas and that the cash belonged to the Treviño brothers. Vasquez arranged for his lawyer in Dallas to represent Gilberto and promised not to let anyone else in the cartel know about Gilberto’s incriminating statements. Moreno repaid the favor by agreeing to get Vasquez the numbers.

The Treviños found out; in response, members of the Zetas seized the towns of Allende and Nava, destroyed 80 houses with heavy machinery, and kidnapped approximately 80 families. These people were not seen again, until the operation began uncovering some of their bodies, many of which allegedly had been dissolved with a mixture of diesel fuel and caustic soda in large barrels of improvised "kitchens", in 2014.

== Geography ==
The city of Allende is located at 28°20′30″N 100°50′2″W, at a height of 380 meters (1,250 ft) above sea level. It straddles Federal Highway 57, with state capital Saltillo some 390 kilometers (240 mi) away to the south, while the international border crossing at Piedras Negras, Coahuila (across the Río Bravo del Norte from Eagle Pass, Texas, United States) is some 55 kilometers (34 mi) to the north. Allende is also crossed by the railway that connects Saltillo to the border city of Ciudad Acuña (across the river from Del Rio, Texas, United States).

Allende municipality covers a total surface area of 198.70 square kilometers (76.72 sq mi) and, in 2000, reported a total population of 20,153. The town's annual festival (fiesta patronal) takes place on 29 August. In addition to the municipal seat, the only other two settlements of any size in the municipality are Río Bravo and Chamucero.

=== Climate ===
Climate data for Allende (1991–2020)
Month	Jan	Feb	Mar	Apr	May	Jun	Jul	Aug	Sep	Oct	Nov	Dec	Year
Record high °C (°F)	38.0 (100.4)	41.0 (105.8)	43.0 (109.4)	49.3 (120.7)	46.0 (114.8)	48.0 (118.4)	46.0 (114.8)	47.0 (116.6)	46.0 (114.8)	42.0 (107.6)	43.0 (109.4)	40.0 (104.0)	49.3 (120.7)
Mean daily maximum °C (°F)	20.5 (68.9)	22.5 (72.5)	26.7 (80.1)	30.5 (86.9)	33.8 (92.8)	36.8 (98.2)	37.1 (98.8)	37.7 (99.9)	33.7 (92.7)	29.6 (85.3)	24.6 (76.3)	21.1 (70.0)	29.6 (85.3)
Daily mean °C (°F)	12.7 (54.9)	14.5 (58.1)	18.5 (65.3)	22.1 (71.8)	26.1 (79.0)	29.1 (84.4)	29.6 (85.3)	29.9 (85.8)	26.8 (80.2)	22.5 (72.5)	17.0 (62.6)	13.1 (55.6)	21.8 (71.2)
Mean daily minimum °C (°F)	4.8 (40.6)	6.6 (43.9)	10.2 (50.4)	13.6 (56.5)	18.3 (64.9)	21.5 (70.7)	22.1 (71.8)	22.1 (71.8)	19.9 (67.8)	15.3 (59.5)	9.4 (48.9)	5.1 (41.2)	14.1 (57.4)
Record low °C (°F)	−7.0 (19.4)	−7.0 (19.4)	−5.0 (23.0)	−5.0 (23.0)	7.0 (44.6)	9.0 (48.2)	0.0 (32.0)	10.0 (50.0)	0.0 (32.0)	2.0 (35.6)	−6.0 (21.2)	−9.0 (15.8)	−9.0 (15.8)
Average precipitation mm (inches)	17.4 (0.69)	16.9 (0.67)	30.2 (1.19)	38.7 (1.52)	67.1 (2.64)	41.3 (1.63)	48.8 (1.92)	52.3 (2.06)	85.1 (3.35)	48.8 (1.92)	25.1 (0.99)	13.9 (0.55)	485.6 (19.12)
Average precipitation days (≥ 0.1 mm)	3.3	2.7	3.4	3.9	4.9	3.4	3.7	3.1	5.4	3.9	2.6	2.2	42.5
Source: Servicio Meteorologico Nacional

== Government ==
=== Municipal presidents ===
Municipal president	Term	Political party
Canuto Muñoz Mares	1939 - 1940	PRM
Alfonso García	1941 - 1941	PRM
Juan de los Santos	1942 - 1942	PRM
Enrique A. Díaz	1943 - 1945	PRM
Juan José Cantú	1946 - 1948	PRI
Salvador F. Ibarra	1949 - 1951	PRI
Isidoro Flores Ramírez	1952 - 1954	PRI
Pedro A. Valdés	1955 - 1955	PRI
Felipe de Alba	1956 - 1957	PRI
Enrique A. Díaz	1958 - 1960	PRI
Evaristo A. Cadena U.	1961 - 1963	PRI
Guter Lara Castro	1964 - 1966	PRI
Humberto Cantú Villarreal	1967 - 1969	PRI
Isaías Ortiz Rubio	1970 - 1972	PRI
Mario J. Lozano G.	1973 - 1975	PRI
Jesús Perales	1976 - 1978	PRI
José Luis Zertuche	1979 - 1981	PRI
Enrique Navarro Montemayor	1982 - 1984	PRI
Héctor Rocha Contreras	1985 - 1987	PRI
Esteban Barrón Zulaica	1988 - 1990	PRI
Mario Salazar Garza	1991 - 1993	PRI
Tomás G. Navarro Valdés	1994 - 1996	PRI
Esteban Barrón Zulaica	1997 - 1999	PRI
Humberto Leonel Moreno V.	2000 - 2002	PRI
Esteban Barrón Zulaica	2003 - 2005	PRI
Ricardo Alfonso Treviño Guevara	2006 - 2009	PRI
Sergio Alonso Lozano Rodríguez	2010 - 2013	PAN
Luis Reynaldo Tapia Valadez	2014 - 2017	PRI
Antero Alberto Alvarado Saldívar	2018 - 2021	UDC -PAN
José de Jesús Díaz Gutiérrez	2022 -	PRI
