= Humberto García Reyes =

Mexican politician

Member of the Chamber of Deputies for Coahuila′s 1st district
- In office 1 September 2006 – 31 August 2009
- Preceded by: Jesús María Ramón Valdés
- Succeeded by: Francisco Saracho Navarro

Personal details
- Born: 6 March 1953 (age 73) Coahuila, Mexico
- Party: National Action Party
- Occupation: Politician

Ángel Humberto García Reyes (born 6 March 1953) is a Mexican politician formerly affiliated with the National Action Party. As of 2014 he served as Deputy of the LX Legislature of the Mexican Congress representing Coahuila.
