= Irma Elizondo Ramírez =

Mexican politician

- Born: 21 November 1945; Sabinas, Coahuila, Mexico
- Died: 4 August 2014 (aged 68); Mexico City
- Occupation: Politician
- Political party: PRI

Irma Elizondo Ramírez (November 21, 1945 – August 4, 2014) was a Mexican politician affiliated with the Institutional Revolutionary Party (PRI). In 2012 she was elected to the Chamber of Deputies for the 62nd Congress, representing the First Federal Electoral District of Coahuila. She died of heart attack, while still in office, on August 4, 2014, at the age of 68.
