= Jesús María Ramón Valdés =

Mexican politician

Member of the Chamber of Deputies for Coahuila's 1st district
- In office 1 September 2003 – 31 August 2006
- Preceded by: Armín Valdés Torres
- Succeeded by: Humberto García Reyes

Personal details
- Born: 15 March 1938 Ciudad Acuña, Coahuila, Mexico
- Died: 7 January 2016 (aged 77) San Antonio, Texas, U.S.
- Party: PRI
- Occupation: Deputy and Senator

Jesús María Ramón Valdés (15 March 1938 – 7 January 2016) was a Mexican politician affiliated with the Institutional Revolutionary Party (PRI). In 2006–2012 he served as a senator during the 60th and 61st sessions of the Congress of the Union, representing Coahuila. He also served in the Chamber of Deputies during the 59th Congress (2003–2006), for Coahuila's first district, and as municipal president of Ciudad Acuña in 1982–1984.

Ramón Valdés died in San Antonio, Texas, U.S., on 7 January 2016.
