= XHZR-FM =

Radio station in Zaragoza, Coahuila

- Zaragoza, Coahuila; Mexico
- Frequency: 97.3 MHz
- Branding: XEZR, La Traviesa de Coahuila

Ownership
- Owner: Grupo M; (Radiotelevisión Norteña, S.A. de C.V.)

History
- First air date: April 16, 1962 (concession)
- Call sign meaning: From "Zaragoza"

Technical information
- Licensing authority: CRT
- Class: AA
- ERP: 6 kW
- HAAT: 67.09 m (220.1 ft)
- Transmitter coordinates: 28°29′00″N 100°54′00″W

Links
- Website: www.grupomradio.mx

XHZR-FM is a radio station on 97.3 FM in Zaragoza, Coahuila. It is known as La Traviesa.

== History ==
XEZR-AM 850 received its concession on April 16, 1962. It was owned by Radiodifusora del Norte, S.A. and broadcast with 1,000 watts as a daytimer. It later began nighttime broadcasts with 250 watts. XEZR later moved to 800 kHz and increased its power to 2 kW day and night. In 2011, XEZR was cleared to migrate to FM.
