= Escobedo Municipality =

Municipality in the Mexican state of Coahuila

Escobedo
- Municipality
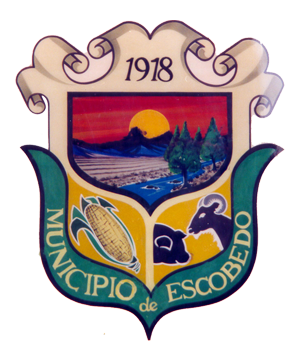
- Coat of arms

- Municipality of Escobedo in Coahuila

- Location in Mexico
- Coordinates: 27°14′6″N 101°24′44″W
- Country: Mexico
- State: Coahuila
- Municipal seat: Escobedo

Area
  - Total: 973.9 km^{2} (376.0 sq mi)

Population (2005)
  - Total: 2,778

Escobedo is one of the 38 municipalities of Coahuila, in north-eastern Mexico. The municipal seat lies at Escobedo. The municipality covers an area of 973.9 km^{2}.

As of 2005, the municipality had a total population of 2,778.
