= Escobedo, Coahuila =

City in the Mexican state of Coahuila

Escobedo
- City
- Location in Mexico
- Coordinates: 27°14′6″N 101°24′44″W
- Country: Mexico
- State: Coahuila
- Municipality: Escobedo

Escobedo is a city in the northern Mexican state of Coahuila. It is located in the state's central region (Región Centro), about 50 km north of Monclova. The city serves as the municipal seat for the surrounding municipality of the same name. The name "Escobedo" honours 19th-century liberal statesman Mariano Escobedo.

Escobedo had 2,791 inhabitants in 2000.

The Ford Motor Company has a commercial truck assembly plant in Escobedo.
