= Quick count =

Method for verification of election results

Quick count is a method for verification of election results by projecting them from a sample of the polling stations.

The similar Parallel Vote Tabulation (PVT) is an election observation method that is typically based on a representative random sample of polling stations and is employed for independent verification (or challenge) of election results. A PVT involves observation of the administration of the election, the process of voting and of counting of ballots at the polling stations, collection of official polling station results and independent tabulation of these results, parallel to election authorities.

== Origin ==
Organizers from the Philippine National Citizen Movement for Free Elections (NAMFREL) are widely recognized as the pioneers of the quick count, or parallel vote tabulation (PVT) for emerging democracies. During a 1986 Presidential election, NAMFREL attempted to mirror the official count of all 90,000 polling stations. They performed a remarkable task in collecting data from the majority of polling stations, providing evidence to help uncover the massive vote counting fraud attempted by Marcos supporters.

== Method ==
Sample-based election observation such as the PVT is grounded in statistics, namely the central limit theorem and the law of large numbers. When a group of observers has access to an official list of polling units (provided by the government or independent election commission), they can deploy a representative random sample of observers from their organization (or election-monitoring coalition of organizations) to polling stations who observe the process of the election and the posted vote count at each polling unit. Following the voting period, observers then transmit the information that they collect back to a central data center for analysis. This data can then be used to make independent and statistically-backed estimates of the vote-share per party or candidate, election turnout and conduct and administration of the election by the election management body.

The approach is described in detail in the National Democratic Institute (NDI)'s The Quick Count and Election Observation. It is also briefly described in section 10B of the Handbook for Domestic Election Observers, published by the Office for Democratic Institutions and Human Rights (ODIHR), which is part of the Organization for Security and Co-operation in Europe (OSCE).

== Use ==
Elections in Indonesia prominently feature quick count procedures, and they are considered more credible than projections by exit polls, or surveys. Elections in Mexico also feature quick count procedures. Elections in Bolivia have both quick counts and traditional counting procedures.

== Examples ==
=== Nigeria 2019 elections ===
The nonprofit YIAGA Africa used PVT to verify the Presidential vote on 23 February 2019. It sent observers but did not use PVT for the state elections on 9 March 2019.

=== Zimbabwe 2008 election ===
The disputed Zimbabwean election held in March 2008, is another example where parallel vote tabulation played a significant (if not conclusive) role in the outcome. Following a concession gained by then President Thabo Mbeki of South Africa in the much-maligned process of "quiet diplomacy", the results at individual polling stations were displayed on the outside. MDC supporters took pictures, often with camera phones, and sent these to a central location (in Johannesburg), where the results were tabulated.

The MDC claimed as a consequence of this process that their candidate, Morgan Tsvangirai, had polled 50.3% of the vote, and that he was thus the outright winner of the election. A six-week hiatus followed, in which no new results were officially released by the Zimbabwean election authority. At the end of the process, it was announced that Mr. Tsvangirai had secured 48.6% of the votes, and that a run-off election would follow.

Although no clear outcome was gained in that election, the parallel vote tabulation played a significant role in preventing outright electoral fraud.
