= Francisco Saracho Navarro =

Mexican politician

- Born: 8 February 1963 (age 63); Ciudad Acuña, Coahuila, Mexico
- Occupation: Politician
- Political party: Institutional Revolutionary Party

Francisco Saracho Navarro (born 8 February 1963) is a Mexican politician from the Institutional Revolutionary Party (PRI). In 2009–2012 and 2015–2018 he served in the Chamber of Deputies, representing the First Federal Electoral District of Coahuila.

== Life ==
Saracho obtained his law degree from Universidad Autónoma de Coahuila in 1984 and promptly began serving in the state government. He served as department chief and later deputy director of the Sanitation and Hygiene Section of the Secretariat of Labor and Social Welfare. From the STPS, he jumped to the National Institute of Statistics and Geography; during his time at INEGI, he coordinated censuses in the State of Mexico and briefly in Coahuila. 1990 saw Saracho change government agencies yet again, this time to Solidaridad, where he served as a regional coordinator in northern, then in southern, Coahuila, and finally as the state coordinator from 1993 to 1994.

1994 saw Saracho become active in the PRI, particularly in the state chapter of Territorial Movement; he served as its state coordinator and secretary general from 1994 to 1996. He also was elected to the LIII Legislature of the Congress of Coahuila during the same years. A year later, voters in Ciudad Acuña elected Saracho municipal president.

Between 2001 and 2005, Saracho directed the Public Property Registry, which records land deeds, for Acuña, Zaragoza and Jiménez. He left that post as he headed into the 2006 state elections, where voters sent him back to the state congress, in its LVII Legislature, after a ten-year absence.

In 2009, voters elected Saracho to the federal Chamber of Deputies for the first time. In the LXI Legislature, he was the secretary of the Constitutional Points Commission and served on five others: Metropolitan Development, Citizen Participation, Oversight of the Superior Auditor of the Federation, and a special committee studying illegal trafficking, customs and ports of entry. He left the Chamber of Deputies when he was tapped by Enrique Peña Nieto to be a state coordinator for the 2012 PRI presidential campaign. From 2012 to 2015, Saracho served as the Coahuila Secretary of Infrastructure.

In January 2015, Saracho resigned from the state government in order to pursue a return to the Chamber of Deputies, representing the first district based in Piedras Negras. He presides over the Cuenca de Burgos Commission and serves on four others, including Communications, Northern Border Matters, Infrastructure, and the Special Commission for the Wine and Berries Industry. The latter was created at Saracho's suggestion, noting the economic importance of the industry and its need to face international competition.
