= Morelos Municipality, Coahuila =

Municipality in the Mexican state of Coahuila

Morelos
- Municipality
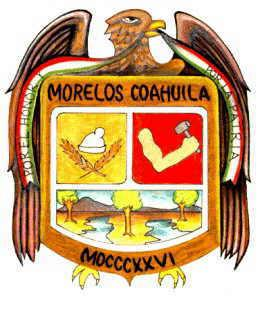
- Coat of arms

- Municipality of Morelos in Coahuila
- Coordinates: 28°24′28″N 100°53′6″W
- Country: Mexico
- State: Coahuila
- Founded: 3 February 1826
- Named for: José María Morelos
- Seat: Morelos
- Largest city: Morelos

Area
  - Total: 606.2 km^{2} (234.1 sq mi)

Population (2005)
  - Total: 1,516

Morelos is one of the 38 municipalities of Coahuila, in north-eastern Mexico. The municipal seat lies at Morelos. The municipality covers an area of 606.2 km^{2}. As of 2005, the municipality had a total population of 1,516.

== Geography ==
=== Adjacent municipalities ===
- Zaragoza Municipality (north)
- Nava Municipality (northeast)
- Allende Municipality (southeast)
- Sabinas Municipality (south)
- San Juan de Sabinas Municipality (southwest)
- Múzquiz Municipality (west)

=== Major highways ===
- Mexican Federal Highway 29
- Coahuila State Highway 10
