= Guerrero Municipality, Coahuila =

Municipality in the Mexican state of Coahuila

Guerrero
- Municipality
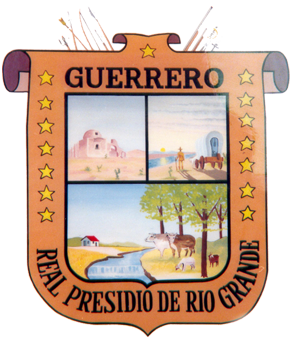
- Coat of arms

- Municipality of Guerrero in Coahuila

- Location in Mexico
- Coordinates: 28°18′30″N 100°22′37″W
- Country: Mexico
- State: Coahuila
- Municipal seat: Guerrero

Area
  - Total: 3,219.7 km^{2} (1,243.1 sq mi)
- Elevation: 216 m (709 ft)

Population (2010)
  - Total: 2,091

Guerrero is one of the 38 municipalities of Coahuila, in north-eastern Mexico. The municipal seat lies at Guerrero. The municipality covers an area of 3,219.7 km^{2} and is located on the international border between Mexico and the USA, here formed by the Río Bravo del Norte (Rio Grande), adjacent to the U.S. state of Texas.

As of 2010, the municipality had a total population of 2,091.

== Towns and villages ==
The largest localities (cities, towns, and villages) are:

Name	2010 Census Population
Guerrero	959
Santa Mónica	324
Guadalupe	168
Total Municipality	2,091

== Adjacent municipalities and counties ==
- Hidalgo Municipality - southeast
- Villa Unión Municipality - southwest and west
- Nava Municipality - northwest
- Piedras Negras Municipality - northwest
- Maverick County, Texas - north and northeast
- Webb County, Texas - east

== See also ==
- Mission San Francisco Solano (Mexico)
