= Zaragoza Municipality, Coahuila =

Municipality in the Mexican state of Coahuila

Zaragoza
- Municipality
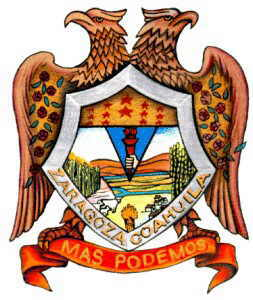
- Coat of arms

- Municipality of Zaragoza in Coahuila
- Coordinates: 28°29′30.32″N 100°55′10.19″W
- Country: Mexico
- State: Coahuila
- Founded: 15 November 1824
- Named for: Ignacio Zaragoza
- Seat: Zaragoza
- Largest city: Zaragoza

Area
  - Total: 8,183.5 km^{2} (3,159.7 sq mi)

Population (2005)
  - Total: 12,411
- Area code: 26450
- Website: Official site

Zaragoza is one of the 38 municipalities of Coahuila, a state in north-eastern Mexico. The municipal seat lies at Zaragoza. The municipality covers an area of 8183.5 km^{2}. It is near the Mexico–US border with Texas. It is one of the cities in the "5 manantiales" (5 springs) region in northern Coahuila. The celebrations commemorating Zaragoza's founding on 1 February 1753 are a popular attraction, and feature a traditional "cabalgata" or horse trail ride with horse pulled vintage buggies. On 7 August 1827, the name of the town was changed to San Fernando de Rosas, and to Zaragoza on the 27 February 1868.

== Economy ==
Zaragoza has an abundance of natural resources like fluoride, silver and lead. Zaragoza's local economy consists of agriculture, some industry, livestock, tourism and commercial/retail.

== Media ==
Zaragoza has a local cable television system and a local radio station, XHZR-FM.

== Geography ==
=== Adjacent municipalities ===
- Acuña Municipality (north)
- Jiménez Municipality (northeast)
- Piedras Negras Municipality (east)
- Nava Municipality (southeast)
- Morelos Municipality (south)
- Múzquiz Municipality (southwest)

=== Major highways ===
- Mexican Federal Highway 29

=== Climate ===
Climate data for Zaragoza
Month	Jan	Feb	Mar	Apr	May	Jun	Jul	Aug	Sep	Oct	Nov	Dec	Year
Mean daily maximum °C (°F)	19.5 (67.1)	22.4 (72.3)	27 (81)	31.3 (88.3)	34.9 (94.8)	37.7 (99.9)	39.1 (102.4)	39 (102)	35.7 (96.3)	30.9 (87.6)	24.6 (76.3)	20.1 (68.2)	30.2 (86.4)
Mean daily minimum °C (°F)	5.6 (42.1)	7.6 (45.7)	11.3 (52.3)	15 (59)	20.3 (68.5)	23.2 (73.8)	24.2 (75.6)	24.0 (75.2)	21 (70)	16.3 (61.3)	10.1 (50.2)	6.6 (43.9)	15.4 (59.7)
Average precipitation mm (inches)	15 (0.6)	30 (1.2)	36 (1.4)	58 (2.3)	79 (3.1)	61 (2.4)	46 (1.8)	58 (2.3)	69 (2.7)	41 (1.6)	23 (0.9)	20 (0.8)	530 (20.9)
Source: Weatherbase
