= Hidalgo Municipality, Coahuila =

Municipality in the Mexican state of Coahuila

Hidalgo
- Municipality
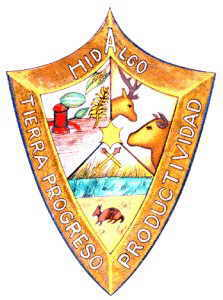
- Coat of arms

- Municipality of Hidalgo in Coahuila

- Location in Mexico
- Coordinates: 27°47′28″N 99°52′27″W
- Country: Mexico
- State: Coahuila
- Municipal seat: Hidalgo

Area
  - Total: 1,619.8 km^{2} (625.4 sq mi)

Population (2010)
  - Total: 1,852

Hidalgo is one of the 38 municipalities of Coahuila, in north-eastern Mexico. The municipal seat lies at Hidalgo. The municipality covers an area of 1619.8 km^{2} and is located on the international border between Mexico and the USA, there formed by the Río Bravo del Norte (Rio Grande), adjacent to the U.S. state of Texas.

As of 2010, the municipality had a total population of 1,852.

== Towns and villages ==
The largest localities (cities, towns, and villages) are:

Name	2010 Census Population
Hidalgo	1,638
El Semoro (Arroyitos)	12
Los Borregos	12
San Francisco	12
Total Municipality	1,852

== Adjacent municipalities and counties ==
- Anáhuac Municipality, Nuevo León - southeast and south
- Juárez Municipality - south
- Villa Unión Municipality - west
- Guerrero Municipality - northwest
- Webb County, Texas - northeast
