= Nava Municipality =

Municipality in the Mexican state of Coahuila

Nava
- Municipality
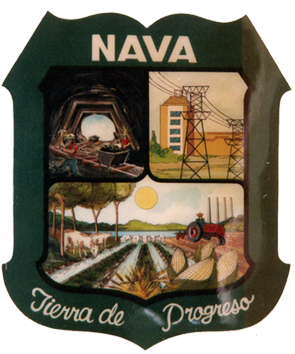
- Coat of arms

- Municipality of Nava in Coahuila

- Location in Mexico
- Coordinates: 28°25′17″N 100°46′03″W
- Country: Mexico
- State: Coahuila
- Municipal seat: Nava

Area
  - Total: 804.9 km^{2} (310.8 sq mi)

Population (2010)
  - Total: 27,928

Nava is one of the 38 municipalities of Coahuila, in north-eastern Mexico. The municipal seat lies at Nava. The municipality covers an area of 804.9 km^{2}.

== Towns and villages ==
The largest localities (cities, towns, and villages) are:

Name	2010 Census Population
Nava	22,192
Colonia Venustiano Carranza	4,921
Estación Río Escondido	220
Colonia Río Escondido	146
Total Municipality	27,928

== Adjacent municipalities ==
- Guerrero Municipality - east and southeast
- Villa Unión Municipality - southwest
- Zaragoza Municipality - northwest
- Piedras Negras Municipality - north
