= Acuña Municipality =

Municipality in the Mexican state of Coahuila

Acuña
- Municipality
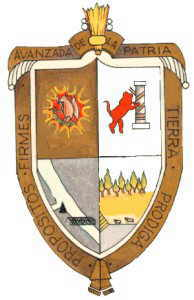
- Coat of arms

- Municipality of Acuña in Coahuila
- Coordinates: 29°30′N 101°45′W
- Country: Mexico
- State: Coahuila
- Municipal seat: Ciudad Acuña

Government
  - Municipal president: Emilio Alejandro de Hoyos Montemayor (2024–2027) ( Democratic Unity of Coahuila)

Area
  - Total: 11,487.7 km^{2} (4,435.4 sq mi)

Population (2015)
  - Total: 181,426

Acuña is one of the 38 municipalities of Coahuila, in north-eastern Mexico. The municipal seat lies at Ciudad Acuña, which contained over 98% of the municipality's population in 2010. The municipality covers an area of 11,487.7 km^{2} and is located on the international border between Mexico and the USA, here formed by the Río Bravo del Norte (Rio Grande), adjacent to the U.S. state of Texas.

In 2015, the municipality had a total population of 181,426 inhabitants. Acuña is currently the fastest growing city in Mexico.

== Towns and villages ==
The largest localities (cities, towns, and villages) are:

Name	2010 Census Population
Ciudad Acuña	134,233
Las Cuevas	399
Calles	373
Las Torres	274
Balcones	263
Total Municipality	136,755

== Adjacent municipalities and counties ==
- Jiménez Municipality - southeast
- Zaragoza Municipality - south
- Múzquiz Municipality - south
- Ocampo Municipality - southwest
- Brewster County, Texas - northwest
- Terrell County, Texas - north
- Val Verde County, Texas - northeast
