= Jiménez Municipality, Coahuila =

Municipality in the Mexican state of Coahuila

Jiménez
- Municipality
- Municipality of Jiménez in Coahuila
- Coordinates: 29°4′11″N 100°40′29″W
- Country: Mexico
- State: Coahuila
- Founded: 1875
- Named for: José Mariano Jiménez
- Seat: Jiménez
- Largest city: San Carlos

Area
  - Total: 3,040.9 km^{2} (1,174.1 sq mi)

Population (2015)
  - Total: 14,919

Jiménez is one of the 38 municipalities of Coahuila, in north-eastern Mexico. The municipal seat lies at Jiménez. The municipality covers an area of 3040.9 km^{2} and is located on the international border between Mexico and the USA, here formed by the Río Bravo del Norte (Rio Grande), adjacent to the U.S. state of Texas.

In 2010, the municipality had a total population of 9,935. Oil was recently discovered in Jiménez, and U.S oil companies are in the process of setting operations on both sides of the border, with the majority of the Mexico operations to be based in Cd. Acuna due to its proximity to Jiménez, and operations on the U.S side will be based in Del Rio, Texas. Companies are already working on infrastructure on the U.S side in Val Verde County. The oil industry is going to create an economical impact on both sides of the border.

== Towns and villages ==
The largest localities (cities, towns, and villages) are:

Name	2010 Census Population
San Carlos	3,126
Jiménez	1,160
Santa María	929
Madero del Río	506
El Orégano	498
Purísima	456
Palmira (Victoria)	428
La Muralla	402
Cristales	388
Total Municipality	9,935

== Adjacent municipalities and counties ==
- Piedras Negras Municipality - southeast
- Zaragoza Municipality - south and west
- Acuña Municipality - north
- Kinney County, Texas - northeast
- Maverick County, Texas - east
