= Allende Municipality, Coahuila =

Municipality in the Mexican state of Coahuila

Allende Municipality
- Municipality
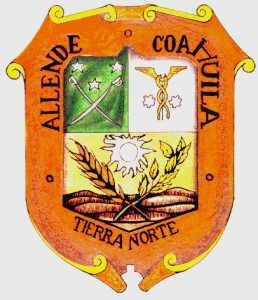
- Coat of arms

- Municipality of Allende in Coahuila

- Location in Mexico
- Coordinates: 28°20′30″N 100°50′2″W
- Country: Mexico
- State: Coahuila
- Municipal seat: Allende

Area
  - Total: 198.7 km^{2} (76.7 sq mi)

Population (2005)
  - Total: 20,153

Allende Municipality is one of the 38 municipalities of Coahuila, in north-eastern Mexico. The municipal seat lies at Allende. The municipality covers an area of 198.7 km^{2}.

== Demographics ==
As of 2005, the municipality had a total population of 20,153.

== Government ==
=== Municipal presidents ===
Municipal president	Term	Political party
Canuto Muñoz Mares	1939 - 1940	PRM
Alfonso García	1941 - 1941	PRM
Juan de los Santos	1942 - 1942	PRM
Enrique A. Díaz	1943 - 1945	PRM
Juan José Cantú	1946 - 1948	PRI
Salvador F. Ibarra	1949 - 1951	PRI
Isidoro Flores Ramírez	1952 - 1954	PRI
Pedro A. Valdés	1955 - 1955	PRI
Felipe de Alba	1956 - 1957	PRI
Enrique A. Díaz	1958 - 1960	PRI
Evaristo A. Cadena U.	1961 - 1963	PRI
Guter Lara Castro	1964 - 1966	PRI
Humberto Cantú Villarreal	1967 - 1969	PRI
Isaías Ortiz Rubio	1970 - 1972	PRI
Mario J. Lozano G.	1973 - 1975	PRI
Jesús Perales	1976 - 1978	PRI
José Luis Zertuche	1979 - 1981	PRI
Enrique Navarro Montemayor	1982 - 1984	PRI
Héctor Rocha Contreras	1985 - 1987	PRI
Esteban Barrón Zulaica	1988 - 1990	PRI
Mario Salazar Garza	1991 - 1993	PRI
Tomás G. Navarro Valdés	1994 - 1996	PRI
Esteban Barrón Zulaica	1997 - 1999	PRI
Humberto Leonel Moreno V.	2000 - 2002	PRI
Esteban Barrón Zulaica	2003 - 2005	PRI
Ricardo Alfonso Treviño Guevara	2006 - 2009	PRI
Sergio Alonso Lozano Rodríguez	2010 - 2013	PAN
Luis Reynaldo Tapia Valadez	2014 - 2017	PRI
Antero Alberto Alvarado Saldívar	2018 - 2021	UDC -PAN
José de Jesús Díaz Gutiérrez	2022 - 2024	PRI
Ricardo Alfonso Treviño Guevara	2024 -	PT; Morena
