= Piedras Negras Municipality =

Municipality in the Mexican state of Coahuila

Piedras Negras
- Municipality
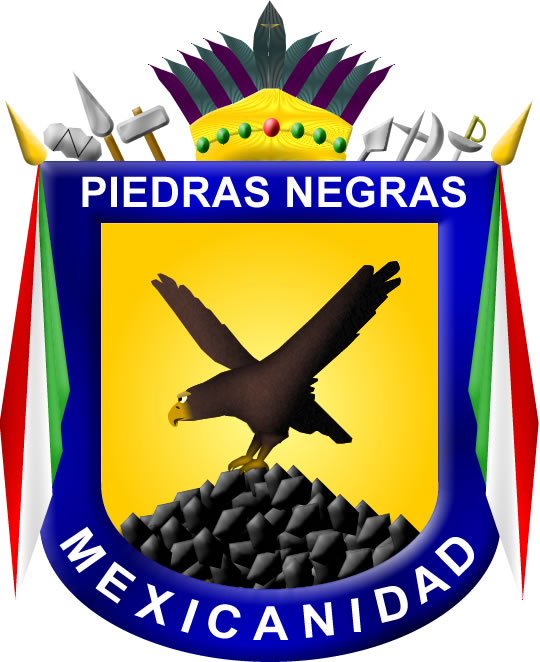
- Coat of arms

- Municipality of Piedras Negras in Coahuila

- Location in Mexico
- Coordinates: 28°43′20″N 100°34′5″W
- Country: Mexico
- State: Coahuila
- Municipal seat: Piedras Negras

Area
  - Total: 914.2 km^{2} (353.0 sq mi)
- Elevation: 223 m (732 ft)

Population (2010)
  - Total: 152,806

Piedras Negras Municipality is one of the 38 municipalities of Coahuila, in north-eastern Mexico. The municipal seat lies at Piedras Negras. The municipality covers an area of 914.2 km^{2} and is located on the international border between Mexico and the USA, here formed by the Río Bravo del Norte (Rio Grande), adjacent to the U.S. state of Texas.

As of 2010, the municipality had a total population of 152,806.

== Towns and villages ==
The largest localities (cities, towns, and villages) are:

Name	2010 Census Population
Piedras Negras	150,178
Centro de Readaptación Social Piedras Negras	830
Fraccionamiento Villa Real	767
El Moral	390
La Navaja (La Loma)	156
San Isidro	117
El Centinela	110
Total Municipality	152,806

== Adjacent municipalities and counties ==
- Nava Municipality - south
- Zaragoza Municipality - west
- Jiménez Municipality - north
- Maverick County, Texas - northeast
