= Villa Unión Municipality =

Municipality in the Mexican state of Coahuila

Villa Unión
- Municipality
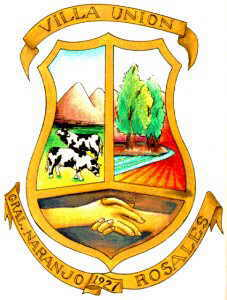
- Coat of arms

- Municipality of Villa Unión in Coahuila

- Location in Mexico
- Coordinates: 28°13′13″N 100°43′28″W
- Country: Mexico
- State: Coahuila
- Municipal seat: Villa Unión

Area
  - Total: 1,540.3 km^{2} (594.7 sq mi)

Population (2005)
  - Total: 6,138

Villa Unión is one of the 38 municipalities of Coahuila, in north-eastern Mexico. The municipal seat lies at Villa Unión. The municipality covers an area of 1540.3 km^{2}.

As of 2005, the municipality had a total population of 6,138.

On November 29, 2019, four police officers and seven armed civilians, members of the Cartel del Noreste, were killed in a shootout during an attack on the Villa Unión Municipal palace. Six other police officers were injured.
