= 2021 Coahuila elections =

Local elections in Mexico

The 2021 Coahuila elections was held on June 6, 2021, to decide the 38 Municipalities top level positions around the state. Municipal elections in Coahuila allow the people to elect members of the Ayuntamiento (City Council) in each municipality. These are called the 38 municipal presidents (Mayors), 74 sindicos and 400 regidores (city councilors). The term of office of councilors, the mayor and his deputies is, in principle, three years. The municipal elections are sanctioned by Electoral Institute of Coahuila since its creation in 2016.

== Background ==
By the 2021, Institutional Revolutionary Party holds 18 out of 38 municipalities seeking to retain them and with the additional goal of winning more. National Action Party holds 12 municipalities, though, its electoral preferences are plummeted. Meanwhile, federal government party National Regeneration Movement holds 4 municipalities (Piedras Negras, Parras, Francisco I. Madero, and Matamoros) since 2018 and during June counts with high-expectations in Coahuila to obtain more municipalities due to the Lopez Obrador popularity.

== Election results ==
=== Northern region ===
==== Acuna ====
Acuna Municipality
Party	Candidate	Votes		Seats
National Action Party	Sergio Garza Castillo	3639	6.10%	1 / 20
Institutional Revolutionary Party	Georgina Cano Torralva	18352	30.80%	4 / 20
Party of the Democratic Revolution	Georgina Cano Torralva	210	0.35%	0 / 20
Ecologist Green Party of Mexico	Pablo Ortega Alvarado	9095	15.26%	2 / 20
Labor Party	Ingrid Valenzuela Martinez	303	0.50%	0 / 20
Citizens' Movement	Kenia Solano Quiroga	715	1.20%	0 / 20
National Regeneration Movement	Emilio de Hoyos	24531	41.18%	13 / 20
Solidarity Encounter Party	Monica Cervantes Villaseñor	298	0.50%	0 / 20
Social Progressive Networks	Ana Cristina Sol Rivera	169	0.28%	0 / 20
Force For Mexico	Norma Maldonado Juarez	402	0.67%	0 / 20
Nonpartisan	Luis Crescencio Zuñiga Meraz	574	0.96%	0 / 20
Valid votes			58288 (97.84%)	
Blank vote/Spoilt vote/Protest vote/Write-in candidate			1281 (2.14%)	
Turnout			51.18 %	
Abstention			48.82%	
Total votes			59569	
PREP-Electoral Institute of Coahuila

==== Guerrero ====
Guerrero Municipality
Party	Candidate	Votes		Seats
National Action Party	Maria del Carmen Anzures Burciaga	338	25.45%	3 / 10
Institutional Revolutionary Party	Mario Cedillo Infante	960	72.28%	7 / 10
Party of the Democratic Revolution	Mario Cedillo Infante	1	0.07%	0 / 10
Valid votes			1299 (97.81%)	
Blank vote/Spoilt vote/Protest vote/Write-in candidate			29 (2.17%)	
Turnout			73.57%	
Abstention			26.43%	
PREP-Electoral Institute of Coahuila

==== Hidalgo ====
Hidalgo Municipality
Party	Candidate	Votes		Seats
National Action Party	Maria Elena Niño Castillo	64	6.00%	0 / 10
Institutional Revolutionary Party	Aleida Guzman Vargas	381	35.74%	2 / 10
Party of the Democratic Revolution	Aleida Guzman Vargas	1	0.09%	0 / 10
Ecologist Green Party of Mexico	Mario Cruz Gutierrez	381	35.74%	7 / 10
National Regeneration Movement	Saul Rascon Rascon	234	21.95%	1 / 10
Valid votes			1057 (99.15%)	
Blank vote/Spoilt vote/Protest vote/Write-in candidate			9 (0.84%)	
Turnout			81.81%	
Abstention			18.19%	
PREP-Electoral Institute of Coahuila

==== Jimenez ====
Jimenez Municipality
Party	Candidate	Votes		Seats
National Action Party	Jorge Eduardo Garcia Hernandez	68	1.36%	0 / 10
Institutional Revolutionary Party	Claudia Maribel Gonzalez	1887	37.81%	7 / 10
Party of the Democratic Revolution	Claudia Maribel Gonzalez	165	3.30%	0 / 10
Ecologist Green Party of Mexico	Maria Elena Ramirez	81	1.62%	0 / 10
Labor Party	Baldemar Hernandez Garcia	1213	24.30%	2 / 10
Democratic Unity of Coahuila	Gilberto Pinales Sanchez	466	9.33%	0 / 10
National Regeneration Movement	Blanca Carmona Cantu	967	19.37%	1 / 10
Solidarity Encounter Party	Nely Vega Martinez	51	1.02%	0 / 10
Valid votes			4898 (98.15%)	
Blank vote/Spoilt vote/Protest vote/Write-in candidate			92 (1.84%)	
Turnout			63.11	
Abstention			26.89%	
PREP-Electoral Institute of Coahuila

==== Piedras Negras ====
Piedras Negras Municipality
Party	Candidate	Votes		Seats
National Action Party	Maria Esther Hernandez Ventura	1228	1.89%	0 / 20
Institutional Revolutionary Party	Norma Treviño Galindo	18922	29.27%	13 / 20
Party of the Democratic Revolution	Norma Treviño Galindo	424	0.65%	0 / 20
Ecologist Green Party of Mexico	Aida Cantu Zayas	584	0.90%	0 / 20
Labor Party	Jacobo Rodriguez	15398	23.82%	2 / 20
Citizens' Movement	Jesus Monarrez	291	0.45%	0 / 20
National Regeneration Movement	Claudio Bres Garza (incumbent)	18041	27.91%	4 / 20
Solidarity Encounter Party	Yolanda Olague	465	0.71%	0 / 20
Social Progressive Networks	Fabian Acevedo Herrera	295	0.45%	0 / 20
Force For Mexico	Lucy Martinez	284	0.43%	0 / 20
Nonpartisanism	Lorenzo Menera Sierra	7568	11.70%	1 / 20
Valid votes			63 743 (98.61%)	
Blank vote/Spoilt vote/Protest vote/Write-in candidate			894 (1.37%)	
Turnout			57.73%	
Abstention			42.27%	
PREP-Electoral Institute of Coahuila

=== Five Springs Region ===
==== Allende ====
Allende Municipality
Party	Candidate	Votes		Seats
National Action Party	Juan Baldemar Portillo Rios	774	7.07%	1 / 15
Institutional Revolutionary Party	Jose de Jesus Diaz Gutierrez	4997	45.67%	10 / 15
Party of the Democratic Revolution	Jose de Jesus Diaz Gutierrez	49	0.44%	0 / 15
Labor Party	Blanca Alonzo Soto	45	0.41%	0 / 15
Citizens' Movement	Gamarys Calvillo Espinoza	417	3.81%	1 / 15
National Regeneration Movement	Luis Fernando Esquivel Fernandez	4382	40.05%	3 / 15
Force For Mexico	Brenda Zurita Cervera	119	1.08%	0 / 15
Valid votes			10783 (98.54%)	
Blank vote/Spoilt vote/Protest vote/Write-in candidate			157 (1.41%)	
Turnout			59.30%	
Abstention			40.70%	
PREP-Electoral Institute of Coahuila

==== Morelos ====
Morelos Municipality
Party	Candidate	Votes		Seats
National Action Party	Arturo Onofre Hernandez	789	19.43%	1 / 10
Institutional Revolutionary Party	Javier de Hoyos (incumbent)	1580	38.89%	7 / 10
Party of the Democratic Revolution	Gerardo de Hoyos Perales (incumbent)	98	2.41%	0 / 10
Citizens' Movement	Marcela Raygoza Eufracio	39	0.96%	0 / 10
National Regeneration Movement	Griselda Treviño Jimenez	1402	34.51%	2 / 10
Force For Mexico	Rita Olivia Quiroz Lopez	116	2.85%	0 / 10
Valid votes			4024 (99.06%)	
Blank vote/Spoilt vote/Protest vote/Write-in candidate			38 (0.93%)	
Turnout			64.94%	
Abstention			25.06%	
PREP-Electoral Institute of Coahuila

==== Nava ====
Nava Municipality
Party	Candidate	Votes		Seats
National Action Party	Carlos Ricardo Fernandez Riojas	3419	27.46%	2 / 14
Institutional Revolutionary Party	Maria del Pilar Valenzuela	4154	33.37%	9 / 14
Party of the Democratic Revolution	Maria del Pilar Valenzuela	40	0.32%	0 / 14
Ecologist Green Party of Mexico	Simon Fabian Herrera	144	1.15%	0 / 14
Labor Party	Mayra Trujillo Gonzalez	85	0.68%	0 / 14
Citizens' Movement	Jose Antonio Gomez	307	2.46%	0 / 14
National Regeneration Movement	Ivan Ochoa Rodriguez	4078	32.76%	3 / 14
Solidarity Encounter Party	Genoveva Gutierrez Nevarez	66	0.53%	0 / 20
Valid votes			12293 (98.74%)	
Blank vote/Spoilt vote/Protest vote/Write-in candidate			155 (1.38%)	
Turnout			58.37%	
Abstention			41.63%	
PREP-Electoral Institute of Coahuila

==== Villa Union ====
Villa Union Municipality
Party	Candidate	Votes		Seats
National Action Party	Mayra Nallely Castillon Torres	115	3.09%	1 / 10
Institutional Revolutionary Party	Mario Gonzalez Vela	1924	51.70%	7 / 10
Party of the Democratic Revolution	Mario Gonzalez Vela	138	3.70%	0 / 10
National Regeneration Movement	Marco Antonio Elizondo Villarreal	1498	40.25%	2 / 10
Valid votes			3675 (98.76%)	
Blank vote/Spoilt vote/Protest vote/Write-in candidate			46 (1.23%)	
Turnout			71.02 %	
Abstention			28.98%	
PREP-Electoral Institute of Coahuila

==== Zaragoza ====
Zaragoza Municipality
Party	Candidate	Votes		Seats
National Action Party	Juan Antonio Gomez Galindo	617	11.19%	0 / 10
Institutional Revolutionary Party	Laura María Galindo Dovalina	1803	32.70%	7 / 10
Party of the Democratic Revolution	Laura María Galindo Dovalina	77	1.39%	0 / 10
Labor Party	Evelio Vara Rivera	1677	30.41%	2 / 10
Citizens' Movement	Carlos Ernesto Santana Guerrero	746	13.53%	1 / 10
National Regeneration Movement	Jose Alfredo Aldape Aguirre	500	9.06%	0 / 10
Valid votes			5420 (98.31%)	
Blank vote/Spoilt vote/Protest vote/Write-in candidate			93 (1.67%)	
Turnout			56.97%	
Abstention			43.03%	
PREP-Electoral Institute of Coahuila

=== Coal-mining Region ===
==== Juarez ====
Juarez Municipality
Party	Candidate	Votes		Seats
National Action Party	Juan Carlos Calderon Orosco	402	35.57%	7 / 10
Institutional Revolutionary Party	Ana Lilia Quiñones	352	31.15%	2 / 10
Party of the Democratic Revolution	Ana Lilia Quiñones	6	0.53%	0 / 10
Citizens' Movement	Diana Sanchez Sanchez	320	28.31%	1 / 10
National Regeneration Movement	Palmira Garza Segura	40	3.53%	0 / 10
Valid votes			1120 (99.11%)	
Blank vote/Spoilt vote/Protest vote/Write-in candidate			10 (0.88%)	
Turnout			80.65%	
Abstention			19.25%	
PREP-Electoral Institute of Coahuila

==== Muzquiz ====
Muzquiz Municipality
Party	Candidate	Votes		Seats
National Action Party	Maria Francisca de la Garza Ortiz	1038	2.98%	0 / 18
Institutional Revolutionary Party	Hector Garcia Falcon	13101	37.63%	7 / 18
Party of the Democratic Revolution	Hector Miguel Garcia Falcon	315	0.90	0 / 18
Ecologist Green Party of Mexico	Elizabeth Del Bosque Larios	219	0.62	0 / 18
Labor Party	Cipriano Portales Bermudez	331	0.95%	0 / 18
Citizens' Movement	Juan Manuel Sanchez Sanchez	413	1.18%	0 / 20
National Regeneration Movement	Tania Flores Guerra	18455	53.01%	11 / 18
Social Progressive Networks	Lucio Lozano Herrera	299	0.85	0 / 18
Force For Mexico	Delia Vazquez Gonzalez	64	0.18	0 / 18
Valid votes			34235 (98.33%)	
Blank vote/Spoilt vote/Protest vote/Write-in candidate			579 (1.66%)	
Turnout			63.46%	
Abstention			36.54%	
PREP- Electoral Institute of Coahuila

==== Progreso ====
Progreso Municipality
Party	Candidate	Votes		Seats
National Action Party	Patricia Elizabeth De Leon Garcia	77	4.10%	1 / 10
Institutional Revolutionary Party	Federico Quintanilla Riojas (incumbent)	1552	82.81%	7 / 10
Party of the Democratic Revolution	Federico Quintanilla Riojas	7	0.37%	0 / 10
National Regeneration Movement	Nora Rodriguez Rivas	205	10.93%	2 / 10
Valid votes			1841 (98.23%)	
Blank vote/Spoilt vote/Protest vote/Write-in candidate			33 (1.75%)	
Turnout			76.58%	
Abstention			23.42%	
PREP-Electoral Institute of Coahuila

==== Sabinas ====
Sabinas Municipality
Party	Candidate	Votes		Seats
National Action Party	David Yutani Kuri	6526	22.15%	3 / 18
Institutional Revolutionary Party	Diana Haro Martinez	11871	40.29%	11 / 18
Party of the Democratic Revolution	Diana Haro Martinez	123	0.41%	0 / 20
Ecologist Green Party of Mexico	Jesus Romo Esquivel	227	0.77%	0 / 20
Labor Party	Raul Navarro Anguiano	180	0.61	0 / 20
Citizens' Movement	Remberto Hernandez	4504	15.28%	2 / 18
National Regeneration Movement	Elizabeth Fernandez Camacho	3929	13.33%	2 / 18
Solidarity Encounter Party	Miguel Angel Lopez	768	2.60%	0 / 20
Force For Mexico	Antonio Abad Cruz	812	2.75%	0 / 20
Valid votes			28940 (98.23%)	
Blank vote/Spoilt vote/Protest vote/Write-in candidate			521 (1.75%)	
Turnout			58.00%	
Abstention			42.00%	
PREP-Electoral Institute of Coahuila

==== San Juan de Sabinas ====
San Juan de Sabinas Municipality
Party	Candidate	Votes		Seats
National Action Party	Jorge Alberto Guajardo Garza	2764	13.58%	1 / 14
Institutional Revolutionary Party	Ana Maria Boone Godoy	7138	35.08%	4 / 14
Party of the Democratic Revolution	Ana Maria Boone Godoy	119	0.58%	0 / 20
Labor Party	Sandra Tobias Tovar	428	2.10	0 / 20
Citizens' Movement	Brenda Flores	293	1.44%	0 / 20
National Regeneration Movement	Mario Lopez Gamez	9143	44.94%	9 / 14
Force For Mexico	Rosaura Rodriguez Salas	165	0.81%	0 / 20
Valid votes			20050 (98.56%)	
Blank vote/Spoilt vote/Protest vote/Write-in candidate			292 (1.43%)	
Turnout			59.66%	
Abstention			41.34%	
PREP-Electoral Institute of Coahuila

=== Desert region ===
==== Cuatrocienegas ====
Cuatrocienegas Municipality
Party	Candidate	Votes		Seats
National Action Party	Yolanda Cantu Moncada (incumbent)	1521	23.88%	2 / 10
Institutional Revolutionary Party	Manuel Villarreal Cortez	2724	42.76%	7 / 10
Party of the Democratic Revolution	Manuel Villarreal Cortez	88	1.38%	0 / 10
Citizens' Movement	Mario Garza Lugo	246	3.86%	0 / 10
National Regeneration Movement	Alma Villarreal Cobas	1506	23.64%	1 / 10
Solidarity Encounter Party	Diana Arredondo Sandoval	30	0.47%	0 / 10
Force For Mexico	Armando Villa Sanchez	186	2.92%	0 / 10
Valid votes			6301 (98.93%)	
Blank vote/Spoilt vote/Protest vote/Write-in candidate			68 (1.06%)	
Turnout			67.69%	
Abstention			32.31%	
| PREP-Electoral Institute of Coahuila

==== Lamadrid ====
Lamadrid Municipality
Party	Candidate	Votes		Seats
National Action Party	Claudio Soto Rodriguez	505	36.59%	2 / 10
Institutional Revolutionary Party	Magdalena Ortiz Pizarro	662	47.97%	7 / 10
Party of the Democratic Revolution	Magdalena Ortiz Pizarro	6	0.43%	0 / 10
Citizens' Movement	Estela Moya Ramirez	19	1.37%	0 / 10
National Regeneration Movement	Fernando Romo Martinez	174	12.60%	1 / 10
Valid votes			1366 (98.98%)	
Blank vote/Spoilt vote/Protest vote/Write-in candidate			14 (1.01%)	
Turnout			85.23%	
Abstention			14.77%	
| PREP-Electoral Institute of Coahuila

==== Nadadores ====
Nadadores Municipality
Party	Candidate	Votes		Seats
National Action Party	Jose Maria Robles Guerrero	1131	34.37%	2 / 10
Institutional Revolutionary Party	Maria Alejandra Huerta Aleman	1320	40.12%	7 / 10
Party of the Democratic Revolution	Maria Alejandra Huerta Aleman	61	1.85%	0 / 10
National Regeneration Movement	Alma Reyes Gloria	696	21.15%	1 / 10
Solidarity Encounter Party	Griselda Flores Peralta	43	1.30%	0 / 10
Valid votes			3251 (98.81%)	
Blank vote/Spoilt vote/Protest vote/Write-in candidate			39 (1.18%)	
Turnout			76.76%	
Abstention			23.24%	
| PREP-Electoral Institute of Coahuila

==== Ocampo ====
Ocampo Municipality
Party	Candidate	Votes		Seats
National Action Party	Vasthi Valdez Hernandez	190	4.39%	0 / 20
Institutional Revolutionary Party	Laura Silva Fernandez (incumbent)	1464	33.84%	7 / 10
Party of the Democratic Revolution	Laura Mara Silva	45	1.04%	0 / 10
Citizens' Movement	Juana Guevara Luna	144	3.32%	0 / 10
National Regeneration Movement	Malena Hernandez Hernandez	566	13.08%	1 / 10
Social Encounter Party	Jaime Musa Bernal	406	9.38%	0 / 10
Force For Mexico	Roberto Barron Reyes	1385	32.02%	2 / 10
Valid votes			4200 (97.10%)	
Blank vote/Spoilt vote/Protest vote/Write-in candidate			125 (2.88%)	
Turnout			60.87%	
Abstention			38.13%	
| PREP-Electoral Institute of Coahuila

==== Sacramento ====
Sacramento Municipality
Party	Candidate	Votes		Seats
National Action Party	Alejandra Limon Castilleja	63	3.58%	1 / 10
Institutional Revolutionary Party	Andrea Ovalle Reyna	883	50.19%	7 / 10
Party of the Democratic Revolution	Andrea Ovalle Reyna	6	0.34%	0 / 10
Democratic Unity of Coahuila	Yajaira Reyna Ramos (Incumbent)	716	40.70%	2 / 10
Solidarity Encounter Party	Cerafin de la Paz	22	1.25%	0 / 10
Social Progressive Networks	Gabriela Vazquez Garcia	52	2.95%	0 / 10
Valid votes			1742 (99.03%)	
Blank vote/Spoilt vote/Protest vote/Write-in candidate			17 (0.96%)	
Turnout			88.21%	
Abstention			11.79%	
| PREP-Electoral Institute of Coahuila

==== San Buenaventura ====
San Buenaventura Municipality
Party	Candidate	Votes		Seats
National Action Party	Rocio Concepcion Rodriguez Carreon	878	7.56%	1 / 14
Institutional Revolutionary Party	Hugo Ivan Lozano	5311	45.75%	9 / 14
Party of the Democratic Revolution	Hugo Lozano Sanchez	67	0.57%	0 / 14
Ecologist Green Party of Mexico	Yajaira Avilez Frausto	193	1.66%	0 / 14
Democratic Unity of Coahuila	Jorge Castillo Salazar	1699	14.63%	1 / 14
Citizens' Movement	Santos Faz Escareño	549	4.72%	1 / 14
National Regeneration Movement	Martha Davila Segovia	2527	21.76%	2 / 14
Solidarity Encounter Party	Marcos Losoya Estrada	212	1.82%	0 / 14
Valid votes			11436 (98.51%)	
Blank vote/Spoilt vote/Protest vote/Write-in candidate			172 (1.47%)	
Turnout			61.98%	
Abstention			38.02%	
| PREP-Electoral Institute of Coahuila

==== Sierra Mojada ====
Sierra Mojada Municipality
Party	Candidate	Votes		Seats
National Action Party	Florencio Romero de la Rosa	499	20.30%	2 / 10
Institutional Revolutionary Party	Elias Portillo Vasquez	1109	45.13%	7 / 10
Party of the Democratic Revolution	Elias Portillo Vasquez	25	1.01%	0 / 10
Citizens' Movement	Hugo Mancha Flores	444	18.07%	1 / 10
National Regeneration Movement	Clarisa Esparza Mendoza	309	12.57%	0 / 10
Solidarity Encounter Party	Emiliano Acevedo Hernandez	49	1.99%	0 / 20
Valid votes			2435 (99.10%)	
Blank vote/Spoilt vote/Protest vote/Write-in candidate			22 (0.89%)	
Turnout			65.87%	
Abstention			24.13%	
| PREP-Electoral Institute of Coahuila

=== Central Region ===
==== Abasolo ====
Abasolo Municipality
Party	Candidate	Votes		Seats
National Action Party	Mirasol Trevino Puente (incumbent)	214	19.59%	1 / 10
Institutional Revolutionary Party	Irene Flores Lerma	355	32.50%	2 / 10
Party of the Democratic Revolution	Irene Flores Lerma	5	0.45%	0 / 10
National Regeneration Movement	Ramiro Reyes Rodriguez	505	46.24%	7 / 10
Valid votes			1079 (98.80%)	
Blank vote/Spoilt vote/Protest vote/Write-in candidate			13 (1.18%)	
Turnout			85.37%	
Abstention			14.63%	
PREP-Electoral Institute of Coahuila

==== Candela ====
Candela Municipality
Party	Candidate	Votes		Seats
National Action Party	Aracelia Jasso Vaquera	751	52.04%	7 / 10
Institutional Revolutionary Party	San Juana Elizondo	556	38.53%	2 / 10
Party of the Democratic Revolution	San Juana Elizondo	7	0.45%	0 / 10
National Regeneration Movement	Hector Hugo Cantu Calderon	113	7.83%	1 / 10
Valid votes			1427 (98.89%)	
Blank vote/Spoilt vote/Protest vote/Write-in candidate			16 (1.10%)	
Turnout			86.82%	
Abstention				
PREP-Electoral Institute of Coahuila

==== Castanos ====
Castanos Municipality
Party	Candidate	Votes		Seats
National Action Party	Luis Horacio de Hoyos Martinez	867	6.61%	1 / 14
Institutional Revolutionary Party	Rolando Gonzalez Puente	5396	41.15%	4 / 14
Party of the Democratic Revolution	Rolando Gonzalez Puente	308	2.34%	0 / 20
Democratic Unity of Coahuila	Carlos Campos	215	1.63%	0 / 14
Citizens' Movement	Soraya Arzola	141	1.07%	0 / 14
National Regeneration Movement	Juan Antonio Garza Garcia	6014	45.87%	9 / 14
Valid votes			12941	
Blank vote/Spoilt vote/Protest vote/Write-in candidate			169	
Turnout			61.27%	
Abstention				
PREP-Electoral Institute of Coahuila

==== Escobedo ====
Escobedo Municipality
Party	Candidate	Votes		Seats
National Action Party	Anahi Estrada Herrera	34	1.73%	0 / 10
Institutional Revolutionary Party	Jorge Maldonado Ibarra	917	46.90%	3 / 10
Party of the Democratic Revolution	Jorge Maldonado Ibarra	20	1.03%	0 / 10
Labor Party	Patricia de Leon Diaz	4	0.20%	0 / 10
National Regeneration Movement	Jesus Huitron Maldonado	951	48.64%	7 / 10
Valid votes			1926 (98.51%)	
Blank vote/Spoilt vote/Protest vote/Write-in candidate			29 (1.48%)	
Turnout			79.53%	
Abstention			20.47%	
PREP-Electoral Institute of Coahuila

==== Frontera ====
Frontera Municipality
Party	Candidate	Votes		Seats
National Action Party	Javier Liñan Garcia	6247	17.94%	1 / 18
Institutional Revolutionary Party	Bella Aleman Reyes	11167	32.07%	5 / 18
Party of the Democratic Revolution	Bella Aleman Reyes	272	0.78%	0 / 20
Ecologist Green Party of Mexico	Zulma Menchaca Villarreal	284	0.81%	0 / 20
Citizens' Movement	Rosa Linda Silva	272	0.78%	0 / 20
National Regeneration Movement	Roberto Piña Amaya	12738	36.58%	11 / 18
Solidarity Encounter Party	Yolanda Ramirez Rodriguez	126		0 / 20
Force For Mexico	Javier Garcia Castillo	2966	8.51%	1 / 18
Valid votes				
Blank vote/Spoilt vote/Protest vote/Write-in candidate				
Turnout				
Abstention				
PREP-Electoral Institute of Coahuila

==== Monclova ====
Monclova Municipality
Party	Candidate	Votes		Seats
National Action Party	Mario Alberto Davila Delgado	30386	31.15%	13 / 20
Institutional Revolutionary Party	Guadalupe Murguia	29043	29.78%	4 / 20
Party of the Democratic Revolution	Guadalupe Murguia	808	0.80%	0 / 20
Ecologist Green Party of Mexico	Rosa Tobias Chavez	617	0.63%	0 / 20
Democratic Unity of Coahuila	Gerardo Bortoni	934	0.95%	0 / 20
Citizens' Movement	Gerardo Almaraz	1756	1.80%	0 / 20
National Regeneration Movement	Cristina de la Rosa	18937	19.41%	2 / 20
Solidarity Encounter Party	Jesús Gonzales Pruneda	224	0.22%	0 / 20
Social Progressive Networks	Juanita Olande Felipe	246	0.25%	0 / 20
Force For Mexico	Cesar Flores Sosa	13015	13.34%	1 / 20
Valid votes			95946 (98.38%)	
Blank vote/Spoilt vote/Protest vote/Write-in candidate			1573 (1.60%)	
Turnout			56.67%	
Abstention			43.23%	
PREP-Electoral Institute of Coahuila

=== La Laguna Region ===
==== Francisco I. Madero ====
Francisco I. Madero Municipality
Party	Candidate	Votes		Seats
National Action Party	Rosa Maribel Coronado Martinez	641	2.20%	0 / 18
Institutional Revolutionary Party	Maria Teresa Acosta Vera	9927	34.09%	5 / 18
Party of the Democratic Revolution	Maria Teresa Acosta Vera	262	0.89%	0 / 18
Ecologist Green Party of Mexico	David Gonzalez Rodriguez	944	3.42%	1 / 18
Labor Party	Magaly Rodriguez Sotelo	462	1.58%	0 / 18
Democratic Unity of Coahuila	Conny Vargas Moreno	343	1.17%	0 / 18
National Regeneration Movement	Jonathan Avalos (incumbent)	13620	46.77%	11 / 18
Solidarity Encounter Party	Adolfo Goytia	272	0.93%	0 / 18
Social Progressive Networks	Carolina Castañon Najera	190	0.65	0 / 18
Force For Mexico	Luis Lopez Alvarez	581	1.99%	0 / 18
Non-Partisan	Manuel Dionisio Estrada	1473	5.05%	1 / 18
Valid votes			28715	
Blank vote/Spoilt vote/Protest vote/Write-in candidate			403	
Turnout			67.31%	
Abstention				
PREP-Electoral Institute of Coahuila

==== Matamoros ====
Matamoros Municipality
Party	Candidate	Votes		Seats
National Action Party	Rosa Maria Gomez Vazquez	733	1.30%	0 / 18
Institutional Revolutionary Party	Miguel Angel Ramirez Lopez	25036	44.44%	11 / 18
Party of the Democratic Revolution	Miguel Angel Ramirez	2029	3.60%	0 / 18
Ecologist Green Party of Mexico	Horacio Piña Avila (Incumbent)	5311	9.42%	1 / 18
Democratic Unity of Coahuila	Georgina Escareño	313	0.55%	0 / 18
Citizens' Movement	Fatima Castillo Morales	775	1.37%	0 / 18
National Regeneration Movement	Valeria Lopez Luevanos	16969	30.12%	5 / 18
Solidarity Encounter Party	Jesus Salazar Garza	548	0.97%	0 / 18
Social Progressive Networks	Javier Valdez Villegas	186	0.33%	0 / 18
Force For Mexico	Silvia Cristina Arellano Ibarra	3340	5.92%	1 / 18
Nonpartisan	Liz Garay	61	0.10%	0 / 18
Valid votes			55301	
Blank vote/Spoilt vote/Protest vote/Write-in candidate			1029	
Turnout			67.93	
Abstention				
PREP-Electoral Institute of Coahuila

==== San Pedro de las Colonias ====
San Pedro de las Colonias Municipality
Party	Candidate	Votes		Seats
National Action Party	Patricia Grado Falcon (incumbent)	10495	20.36%	2 / 18
Institutional Revolutionary Party	David Ruiz Mejia	17156	33.28%	11 / 18
Party of the Democratic Revolution	David Ruiz Mejia	697	1.35%	0 / 18
Ecologist Green Party of Mexico	Edgar Sanchez Garza	12250	23.76%	3 / 18
Labor Party	Deyaneira Seturiano	200	0.38%	0 / 18
Democratic Unity of Coahuila	Martha Wong Garduño	83		0 / 18
Citizens' Movement	Mireya Hernandez	387	0.75	0 / 18
National Regeneration Movement	Karla Rodriguez Romero	6908	13.40%	2 / 18
Solidarity Encounter Party	Lorena Garcia	245	0.47%	0 / 18
Force For Mexico	Laura Elena Frausto	252	0.48%	0 / 18
Non-Partisan	Oralia Jimenez	1405	2.72%	0 / 18
Non-Partisan	José Narvaez	138	0.26%	0 / 18
Valid votes			50216	
Blank vote/Spoilt vote/Protest vote/Write-in candidate			1331	
Turnout			69.54%	
Abstention				
PREP-Electoral Institute of Coahuila

==== Torreon ====
Torreon Municipality
Party	Candidate	Votes		Seats
National Action Party	Marcelo Torres Cofiño	58916	19.13%	3 / 20
Institutional Revolutionary Party	Roman Alberto Cepeda	129475	42.04%	13 / 20
Party of the Democratic Revolution	Roman Alberto Cepeda	2036	0.66%	0 / 20
Ecologist Green Party of Mexico	Lily Leal Romo	2904	0.94%	0 / 20
Democratic Unity of Coahuila	Estrella Salas	273	0.08%	0 / 20
Citizens' Movement	Anna Bermudez Macias	2588	0.84%	0 / 20
National Regeneration Movement	Luis Fernando Salazar	100398	32.60%	4 / 20
Solidarity Encounter Party	Mariana Roman Leyer	897	0.29%	0 / 20
Social Progressive Networks	Victor Arellano Cobian	913	0.29%	0 / 20
Force For Mexico	Sandra Sierra Limones	2640	0.85%	0 / 20
Nonpartisan	Jorge Rios Contreras	1051	0.34%	0 / 20
Valid votes			302091 (98.09%)	
Blank vote/Spoilt vote/Protest vote/Write-in candidate			5848 (1.89%)	
Turnout			60.02%	
Abstention			39.98%	
PREP-Electoral Institute of Coahuila

==== Viesca ====
Viesca Municipality
Party	Candidate	Votes		Seats
National Action Party	Patricia Solis Ortiz	120	1.15%	0 / 10
Institutional Revolutionary Party	Hilario Escobedo de la Paz	4196	40.38%	7 / 10
Party of the Democratic Revolution	Hilario Escobedo de la Paz	86	0.82%	0 / 10
Ecologist Green Party of Mexico	Giselle Nuñez	88	0.84%	0 / 10
Labor Party	Jorge Velez Sandoval	2232	21.48%	1 / 10
Democratic Unity of Coahuila	Luz Fabela Navarro	107	1.02%	0 / 20
National Regeneration Movement	Alejandra Lopez Favela	2888	27.79%	2 / 10
Solidarity Encounter Party	Cynthia Alima Saucedo Hernández	27	0.25%	0 / 10
Force For Mexico	Leonardo Rodriguez Chairez	470	4.52%	0 / 20
Valid votes			10214 (98.31%)	
Blank vote/Spoilt vote/Protest vote/Write-in candidate			175 (1.68%)	
Turnout			68.88%	
Abstention			31.12%	
PREP-Electoral Institute of Coahuila

=== Southeastern Region ===
==== Arteaga ====
Arteaga Municipality
Party	Candidate	Votes		Seats
National Action Party	Ana Marcela Valdes Carbonell	1483	12.08%	1 / 14
Institutional Revolutionary Party	Ramiro Duran Garcia	7700	62.74%	9 / 14
Party of the Democratic Revolution	Ramiro Duran Garcia	68	0.55%	0 / 14
Ecologist Green Party of Mexico	Gricela Lara Hernandez	142	1.15%	0 / 14
Democratic Unity of Coahuila	Hirma Solis Torres	66	0.53%	0 / 14
Citizens' Movement	Nayra Muñiz Gonzalez	148	1.20%	0 / 14
National Regeneration Movement	Hilda Minerva Vasquez Aldape	1894	15.43%	4 / 14
Solidarity Encounter Party	Ruben Loera Flores	306	2.49%	0 / 14
Social Progressive Networks	Fermin Garcia Cepeda	130	1.05%	0 / 14
Force For Mexico	Francisca Camacho de Leon	75	0.61%	0 / 14
Valid votes			12012 (97.88%)	
Blank vote/Spoilt vote/Protest vote/Write-in candidate			259 (2.10%)	
Turnout			64.51%	
Abstention			25.49%	
PREP-Electoral Institute of Coahuila

==== General Cepeda ====
General Cepeda Municipality
Party	Candidate	Votes		Seats
National Action Party	Pablo Salas Aguirre	3252	48.78%	7 / 10
Institutional Revolutionary Party	Mayra Ramos de Zamora	2367	35.50%	2 / 10
Party of the Democratic Revolution	Mayra Ramos de Zamora	181	2.71%	0 / 10
Ecologist Green Party of Mexico	Jesús Antonio Zamora Rodriguez	134	2.01%	0 / 10
Labor Party	Benjamin Tellez Lopez	261	3.91%	1 / 10
Democratic Unity of Coahuila	Antonieta Oyervides Valdes	21	0.31%	0 / 10
Citizens' Movement	Gerardo Camacho Rodriguez	47	0.70%	0 / 10
National Regeneration Movement	Cynthia Cerda Gonzalez	260	3.90%	0 / 10
Valid votes			6523 (97.85%)	
Blank vote/Spoilt vote/Protest vote/Write-in candidate			143 (2.14%)	
Turnout			71.03%	
Abstention			28.97%	
PREP-Electoral Institute of Coahuila

==== Parras ====
Parras Municipality
Party	Candidate	Votes		Seats
National Action Party	Adolfo Perales Huerta	394	1.75%	0 / 14
Institutional Revolutionary Party	Fernando Orozco Lara	7447	33.19%	9 / 14
Party of the Democratic Revolution	Fernando Orozco Lara	883		0 / 14
Ecologist Green Party of Mexico	Jose Antonio Luna Serrano	153	0.68%	0 / 14
Labor Party	Jesus Pablo Sanchez	1161	5.17%	0 / 14
Citizens' Movement	Gerardo Davila Ochoa	2728	12.61%	1 / 14
National Regeneration Movement	Brenda Velez Zurita	1596	7.11%	1 / 14
Solidarity Encounter Party	Guadalupe Segovia	223	0.99%	0 / 14
Social Progressive Networks	Gerardo Mendoza Martinez	387	1.72%	0 / 14
Force For Mexico	Ignacio Segura Teniente	4449	19.83%	2 / 14
Nonpartisan	Isidro Miguel Cruz	2382	10.61%	1 / 14
Valid votes				
Blank vote/Spoilt vote/Protest vote/Write-in candidate				
Turnout				
Abstention				
PREP-Electoral Institute of Coahuila

==== Ramos Arizpe ====
Ramos Arizpe Municipality
Party	Candidate	Votes		Seats
National Action Party	Elena Concepcion Coss Cossio	2100	5.91%	1 / 18
Institutional Revolutionary Party	Jose Maria Morales (incumbent)	19997	56.29%	11 / 18
Party of the Democratic Revolution	Jose Maria Morales (incumbent)	517	1.45%	0 / 20
Ecologist Green Party of Mexico	Areli Flores	1732	4.87%	1 / 18
Labor Party	Erika Martinez Lopez	201	0.56%	0 / 20
Citizens' Movement	Claudia Hernandez	421	1.18%	0 / 18
National Regeneration Movement	Ariel Leza Maldonado	9332	26.26%	5 / 18
Solidarity Encounter Party	Samuel Acevedo Presas	289	0.81%	0 / 20
Social Progressive Networks	Esmeralda Cruz Perez	78	0.21%	0 / 20
Force For Mexico	Juana Garcia Rocha	160	0.45%	0 / 20
Valid votes			34827	
Blank vote/Spoilt vote/Protest vote/Write-in candidate			687	
Turnout			49.72%	
Abstention				
PREP-Electoral Institute of Coahuila

==== Saltillo ====
Saltillo Municipality
Party	Candidate	Votes		Seats
National Action Party	Teresa Romo Castillón	17506	5.48%	1 / 20
Institutional Revolutionary Party	Jose Maria Fraustro Siller	154528	48.38%	12 / 20
Party of the Democratic Revolution	Jose Maria Fraustro Siller	5609	1.75%	1 / 20
Ecologist Green Party of Mexico	Limbar Valdez Montemayor	9015	2.82%	0 / 20
Labor Party	Magdalena Balderas Casas	1532	0.47%	0 / 20
Democratic Unity of Coahuila	Christian Cabello Romero	835	0.26%	0 / 20
Citizens' Movement	Mirna Narro Garcia	4880	1.52%	0 / 20
National Regeneration Movement	Armando Guadiana Tijerina	115191	36.06%	6 / 20
Solidarity Encounter Party	Vanessa Villarreal Narro	1453	0.45%	0 / 20
Force For Mexico	Enrique Navarro Flores	2020	0.63%	0 / 20
Valid votes			312569 (97.86%)	
Blank vote/Spoilt vote/Protest vote/Write-in candidate			6810 (2.12%)	
Turnout			53.16%	
Abstention			46.84%	
Electoral Institute of Coahuila

== See also ==
- 2021 Mexican local elections
- 2021 Mexican legislative election
- 2021 Mexican gubernatorial elections
