= 2nd federal electoral district of Coahuila =

Federal electoral district of Mexico

Coahuila's 2nd
- Electoral district of the Chamber of Deputies of Mexico

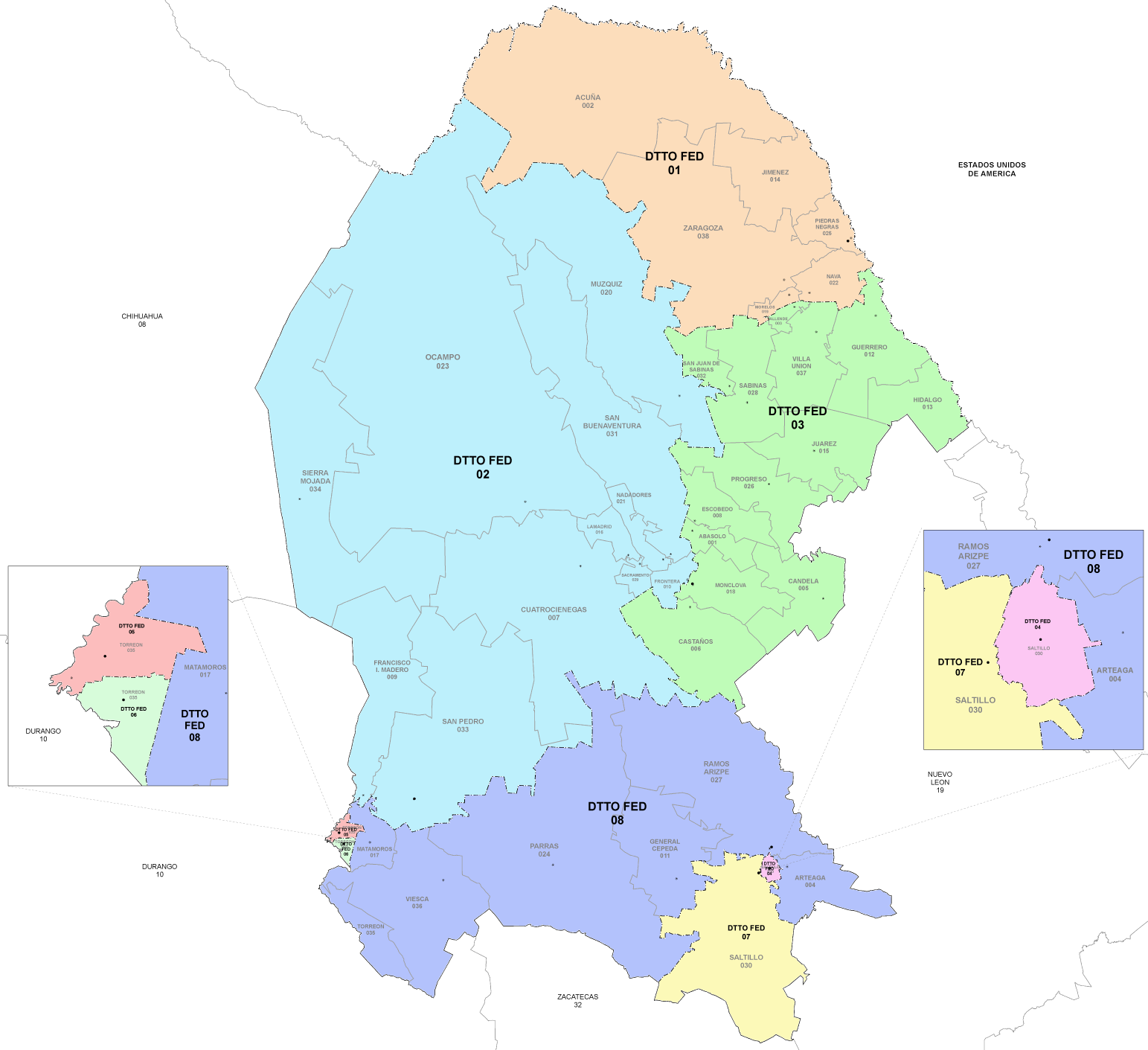
- 2nd district since 2022

Incumbent
- Member: Javier Borrego Adame
- Party: ▌Morena
- Congress: 66th (2024–2027)

District
- State: Coahuila
- Head town: San Pedro de las Colonias
- Coordinates: 25°45′N 102°58′W
- Covers: 11 municipalities: Cuatrociénegas, Francisco I. Madero, Frontera, Lamadrid, Múzquiz, Nadadores, Ocampo, Sacramento, San Buenaventura, San Pedro, Sierra Mojada
- PR region: Second
- Precincts: 268
- Population: 378,794 (2020 census)

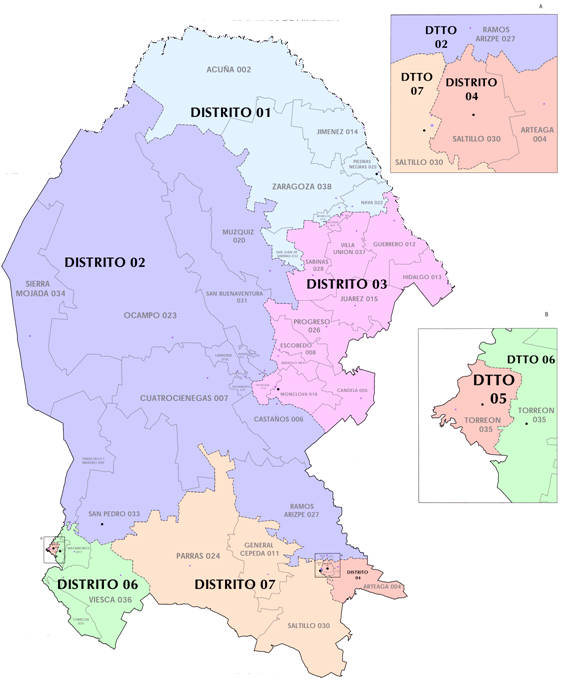
Coahuila under the 2017–2022 districting plan

The 2nd federal electoral district of Coahuila (Spanish: Distrito electoral federal 02 de Coahuila) is one of the 300 electoral districts into which Mexico is divided for elections to the federal Chamber of Deputies and one of eight such districts in the state of Coahuila.

It elects one deputy to the lower house of Congress for each three-year legislative session by means of the first past the post system. Votes cast in the district also count towards the calculation of proportional representation ("plurinominal") deputies elected from the second region.

The current member for the district, re-elected in the 2024 general election, is Francisco Javier Borrego Adame of the National Regeneration Movement (Morena).

== District territory ==
The district is one of the country's largest in terms of its surface area. In its 2023 districting plan, which is to be used for the 2024, 2027 and 2030 federal elections, the National Electoral Institute (INE) assigned Coahuila an additional district. The reconfigured 2nd district covers 268 electoral precincts (secciones electorales) across 11 municipalities:

- Cuatrociénegas, Francisco I. Madero, Frontera, Lamadrid, Múzquiz, Nadadores, Ocampo, Sacramento, San Buenaventura, San Pedro and Sierra Mojada.

The head town (cabecera distrital), where results from individual polling stations are gathered together and tallied, is the city of San Pedro de las Colonias. The district reported a population of 378,794 in the 2020 census.

== Previous districting schemes ==
Evolution of electoral district numbers
	1974	1978	1996	2005	2017	2023
Coahuila	4	7	7	7	7	8
Chamber of Deputies	196	300				

2017–2022

Between 2017 and 2022, the district covered 12 municipalities: Castaños, Cuatrociénegas, Francisco I. Madero, Lamadrid, Múzquiz, Nadadores, Ocampo, Ramos Arizpe, Sacramento, San Buenaventura, San Pedro de las Colonias, and Sierra Mojada. The head town was at San Pedro de las Colonias.

2005–2017

From 2005 to 2017, the district was in the same region of the state in the 2002 scheme. It comprised 11 municipalities: Cuatrociénegas, Francisco I. Madero, Frontera, Lamadrid, Múzquiz, Nadadores, Ocampo, San Juan de Sabinas, San Pedro de las Colonias, San Buenaventura and Sierra Mojada. The head town was the city of San Pedro de las Colonias.

1996–2005

Between 1996 and 2005, the district was in the same part of the state and comprised 12 municipalities: Cuatrociénegas, Francisco I. Madero, Frontera, Lamadrid, Múzquiz, Nadadores, Ocampo, San Juan de Sabinas, San Pedro de las Colonias, San Buenaventura and Sierra Mojada.

1978–1996

The districting scheme in force from 1978 to 1996 was the result of the 1977 electoral reforms, which increased the number of single-member seats in the Chamber of Deputies from 196 to 300. Under that plan, Coahuila's seat allocation rose from 4 to 7. The district had its head town at Torreón and it covered a part of that city.

== Deputies returned to Congress ==
(Mexico) National parties
- Current
- PAN
- PRI
- PT
- PVEM
- MC
- Morena
- PAZ
- Somos
- Defunct or local only
- PLM
- PNR
- PRM
- PNM
- PP
- PPS
- PARM
- PFCRN
- CON
- PANAL
- PSD
- PES
- PES
- PRD

Coahuila's 2nd district
Election	Deputy	Party	Term	Legislature
1916	Ernesto Meade Fierro		1916–1917	Constituent Congress of Querétaro
1917	Vacant		1917–1918	27th Congress
1918	Gustavo Gámez		1918–1920	28th Congress
1920	Aureliano J. Mijares	Laborist Party (Mexico)	1920–1922	29th Congress
1922	Adrián Aguirre Benavides	Laborist Party (Mexico)	1922–1924	30th Congress
1924	Vicente Santos Guajardo	Laborist Party (Mexico)	1924–1926	31st Congress
1926	Eduardo C. Loustaunau		1926–1930	32nd Congress
1928	Eduardo C. Loustaunau		1926–1930	33rd Congress
1930	Manuel Mijares V.		1930–1934	34th Congress
1932	Manuel Mijares V.		1930–1934	35th Congress
1934	Gustavo Espinoza Mireles	Institutional Revolutionary Party	1934–1937	36th Congress
1937	Juan Pérez	Institutional Revolutionary Party	1937–1940	37th Congress
1940	Genaro S. Cervantes	Institutional Revolutionary Party	1940–1943	38th Congress
1943	Ubaldo Veloz	Institutional Revolutionary Party	1943–1946	39th Congress
1946	León V. Paredes	Institutional Revolutionary Party	1946–1949	40th Congress
1949	Juan Magos Borjón	Institutional Revolutionary Party	1949–1952	41st Congress
1952	José Villarreal Corona	Institutional Revolutionary Party	1952–1955	42nd Congress
1955	Amador Robles Santibáñez	Institutional Revolutionary Party	1955–1958	43rd Congress
1958	Manuel Calderón Salas	Institutional Revolutionary Party	1958–1961	44th Congress
1961	Braulio Fernández Aguirre; Rodolfo Siller Rodríguez	Institutional Revolutionary Party	1961–1963; 1963–1964	45th Congress
1964	Alfonso Reyes Aguilera	Institutional Revolutionary Party	1964–1967	46th Congress
1967	Heriberto Ramos González	Institutional Revolutionary Party	1967–1970	47th Congress
1970	Luis Horacio Salinas Aguilera	Institutional Revolutionary Party	1970–1973	48th Congress
1973	Francisco Rodríguez Ortiz	Institutional Revolutionary Party	1973–1976	49th Congress
1976	Carlos Ortiz Tejeda	Institutional Revolutionary Party	1976–1979	50th Congress
1979	Juan Antonio García Villa	]	1979–1982	51st Congress
1982	Víctor González Avelar	Institutional Revolutionary Party	1982–1985	52nd Congress
1985	Braulio Manuel Fernández Aguirre	Institutional Revolutionary Party	1985–1988	53rd Congress
1988	Alicia López de la Torre	Institutional Revolutionary Party	1988–1991	54th Congress
1991	Francisco José Dávila Rodríguez	Institutional Revolutionary Party	1991–1994	55th Congress
1994	Manlio Fabio Gómez Uranga	Institutional Revolutionary Party	1994–1997	56th Congress
1997	Javier Guerrero García; José Villarreal Navarro	Institutional Revolutionary Party	1997–1999; 1999–2000	57th Congress
2000	Jesús de la Rosa Godoy	Institutional Revolutionary Party	2000–2003	58th Congress
2003	Jesús Zúñiga Romero	Institutional Revolutionary Party	2003–2006	59th Congress
2006	Javier Guerrero García	Institutional Revolutionary Party	2006–2009	60th Congress
2009	Hugo Héctor Martínez González	Institutional Revolutionary Party	2009–2012	61st Congress
2012	José Luis Flores Méndez	Institutional Revolutionary Party	2012–2015	62nd Congress
2015	Ana María Boone Godoy	Institutional Revolutionary Party	2015–2018	63rd Congress
2018	Javier Borrego Adame	National Regeneration Movement	2018–2021	64th Congress
2021	Javier Borrego Adame	National Regeneration Movement	2021–2024	65th Congress
2024	Javier Borrego Adame	National Regeneration Movement	2024–2027	66th Congress

== Presidential elections ==
Coahuila's 2nd district
Election	District won by	Party or coalition	%
2018	Andrés Manuel López Obrador	Juntos Haremos Historia	47.2227
2024	Claudia Sheinbaum Pardo	Sigamos Haciendo Historia	59.8990
