= Ocampo Municipality, Coahuila =

Municipality in the Mexican state of Coahuila

Ocampo
- Municipality
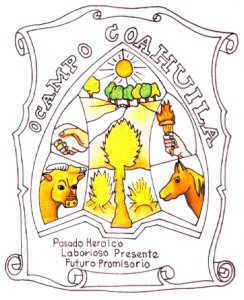
- Coat of arms

- Municipality of Ocampo in Coahuila

- Location in Mexico
- Coordinates: 27°18′50″N 102°23′50″W
- Country: Mexico
- State: Coahuila
- Municipal seat: Ocampo

Area
  - Total: 26,433 km^{2} (10,206 sq mi)

Population (2010)
  - Total: 10,991

Ocampo is one of the 38 municipalities of Coahuila, in north-eastern Mexico, and the largest by area. The municipal seat lies at Ocampo. The municipality covers an area of 26,433 km^{2} and is located on the international border between Mexico and the USA, here formed by the Río Bravo del Norte (Rio Grande), adjacent to the U.S. state of Texas.

In 2010, the municipality had a total population of 10,991.

== Towns and villages ==
The largest localities (cities, towns, and villages) are:

Name	2010 Census Population
Ocampo	3,679
Laguna del Rey (Químicas del Rey)	2,651
Chula Vista	1,671
San Miguel	259
La Rosita	257
Boquillas del Carmen	110
Total Municipality	10,991

== Adjacent municipalities and counties ==
- Acuña Municipality - northeast
- Múzquiz Municipality - northeast
- San Buenaventura Municipality - east
- Nadadores Municipality - southeast
- Lamadrid Municipality - southeast
- Cuatrociénegas Municipality - south
- Sierra Mojada Municipality - west
- Camargo Municipality, Chihuahua - west
- Manuel Benavides Municipality, Chihuahua - northwest
- Brewster County, Texas - north
