= Francisco I. Madero (disambiguation) =

Francisco I. Madero (1873‒1913) was a Mexican politician and revolutionary who served as the 33rd President of Mexico.

Francisco I. Madero may also refer to:

- Francisco I. Madero, Durango
- Francisco I. Madero, Coahuila
  - Francisco I. Madero Municipality, Coahuila, the municipal seat
- Francisco I. Madero Municipality, Hidalgo
