= José Luis Flores Méndez =

Mexican politician

- Born: 28 April 1956 (age 70); San Pedro, Coahuila, Mexico
- Occupation: Deputy
- Political party: PRI

José Luis Flores Méndez (born 28 April 1956) is a Mexican politician affiliated with the Institutional Revolutionary Party (PRI). In 2012–2015 he served in the Chamber of Deputies for the 52nd session of Congress, representing Coahuila's second district. He also served as a deputy for the 56th session (1994–1997), representing Coahuila's seventh district.
