= Javier Guerrero García =

Mexican politician

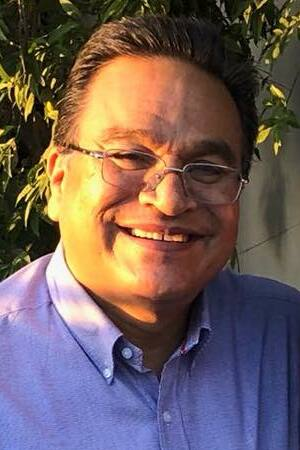
- Javier Guerrero García in 2018
- Born: 20 October 1958 (age 67); San Pedro, Coahuila, Mexico
- Occupation: Politician
- Political party: Independent

Javier Guerrero García (born 20 October 1958) is a Mexican politician affiliated with the Institutional Revolutionary Party (PRI). He represented Coahuila and the second electoral region as a deputy in the LXIII Legislature of the Mexican Congress.

== Life ==
Guerrero García's lengthy political career began when he joined the PRI in 1979, after he graduated from the Universidad Autónoma de Coahuila with a degree in political science and public administration. After obtaining a master's degree from the National Public Administration Institute (INAP) in 1981, he briefly served as the institution's president in 1982 before beginning a lengthy public service and party career. He worked on the PRI's 1982 presidential campaign in regional get-out-the-vote efforts and then bounced around different government agencies: he worked briefly in the Secretariat of the Interior, then in the Secretariat of Agricultural Reform as a technical secretary and program coordinator, and between 1985 and 1987, he worked in the General Comptroller of the Federation. Additionally, he was a professor at schools including the Universidad Iberoamericana, UNAM, INAP and the Universidad Autónoma del Estado de México.

1988 marked a watershed for Guerrero García, as he became the municipal president of San Pedro de las Colonias, his birthplace. His term ended in 1990, and after a brief stint in the National Solidarity Program, the PRI sent him to a legislature for the first time. In the LV Legislature of the Mexican Congress, which met between 1991 and 1994, Guerrero sat on a finance oversight commission, as well as those dealing with the budget and agricultural reform. Simultaneously, he also served on the advisory council of the National Solidarity Program.

After a three-year stretch as the deputy director general of operations of the DIF, Guerrero returned to San Lázaro for the LVII Legislature of the Mexican Congress. In his second tour as a deputy, he sat on commissions dealing with Science and Technology; Bicameral for Peace and Reconciliation; Municipal Strengthening; and Programming, Budget and Public Accounts. In 1999, Guerrero was tapped as the state finance secretary of Coahuila and remained in that position for almost all of the six-year term of Governor Enrique Martínez y Martínez.

Throughout all of this, Guerrero rose through the ranks in the PRI and its affiliated Confederación Nacional Campesina. He served as a deputy national secretary and as an alternate to the secretary of organization in the CNC; assisted in PRI gubernatorial campaigns; and ran as a candidate for secretary general of the PRI in 2000. In 2005, he made a run for Governor of Coahuila, but the PRI opted to select Humberto Moreira as its candidate instead.

In 2006, Guerrero returned once more to the federal legislature as a deputy to the LX Legislature of the Mexican Congress. He was a secretary on the Committee for the Center for the Study of Public Finances and on the Budget and Public Accounts Commission. He also sat on commissions dealing with civil service, finances, auditing, and the special commission formed to investigate the Pasta de Conchos mine disaster. In 2008, while still in the legislature, he became the PRI's national secretary of social management for a three-year term.

With his term as a PRI secretary completed, in 2011, Guerrero García made a brief return to the Coahuila state cabinet as the secretary of economic development; a year later, he moved to the Secretariat of Social Development (SEDESOL), where he was a deputy secretary of community development and social participation.

For the fourth time, the PRI sent Guerrero to the Chamber of Deputies in 2015, this time as a proportional representation deputy instead of from the Second Federal Electoral District of Coahuila. As has been the case in prior legislatures, his commission assignments are largely financial and budgetary; for instance, yet again, Guerrero sits on the Budget and Public Accounts Commission, as well as the oversight commission for the Superior Auditor of the Federation and the Committee for the Center for the Study of Public Finances. However, owing to his recent post in the SEDESOL, he is the president of the Social Development Commission. He is also considered a potential contender for the PRI candidacy in the 2017 gubernatorial election in Coahuila.
