= Cuatro Cienegas shiner =

Conservation status
- Endangered (IUCN 3.1)

Scientific classification
- Kingdom: Animalia
- Phylum: Chordata
- Class: Actinopterygii
- Division: Teleostei
- Order: Cypriniformes
- Family: Leuciscidae
- Subfamily: Pogonichthyinae
- Genus: Cyprinella
- Species: C. xanthicara

Binomial name
- Cyprinella xanthicara (W. L. Minckley & Lytle, 1969)

Synonyms
- Notropis xanthicara Minckley & Lytle, 1969

Species of fish

The Cuatro Cienegas shiner (Cyprinella xanthicara) is a species of freshwater ray-finned fish in the family Leuciscidae, the shiners, daces and minnows.

== Distribution ==
The small fish is endemic to the springs and marshes of the Cuatro Ciénegas and Cuatrociénegas Municipality area of Coahuila state in northeastern Mexico.

It is an Endangered species.
