= 8th federal electoral district of Coahuila =

Federal electoral district of Mexico

Coahuila's 8th
- Electoral district of the Chamber of Deputies of Mexico

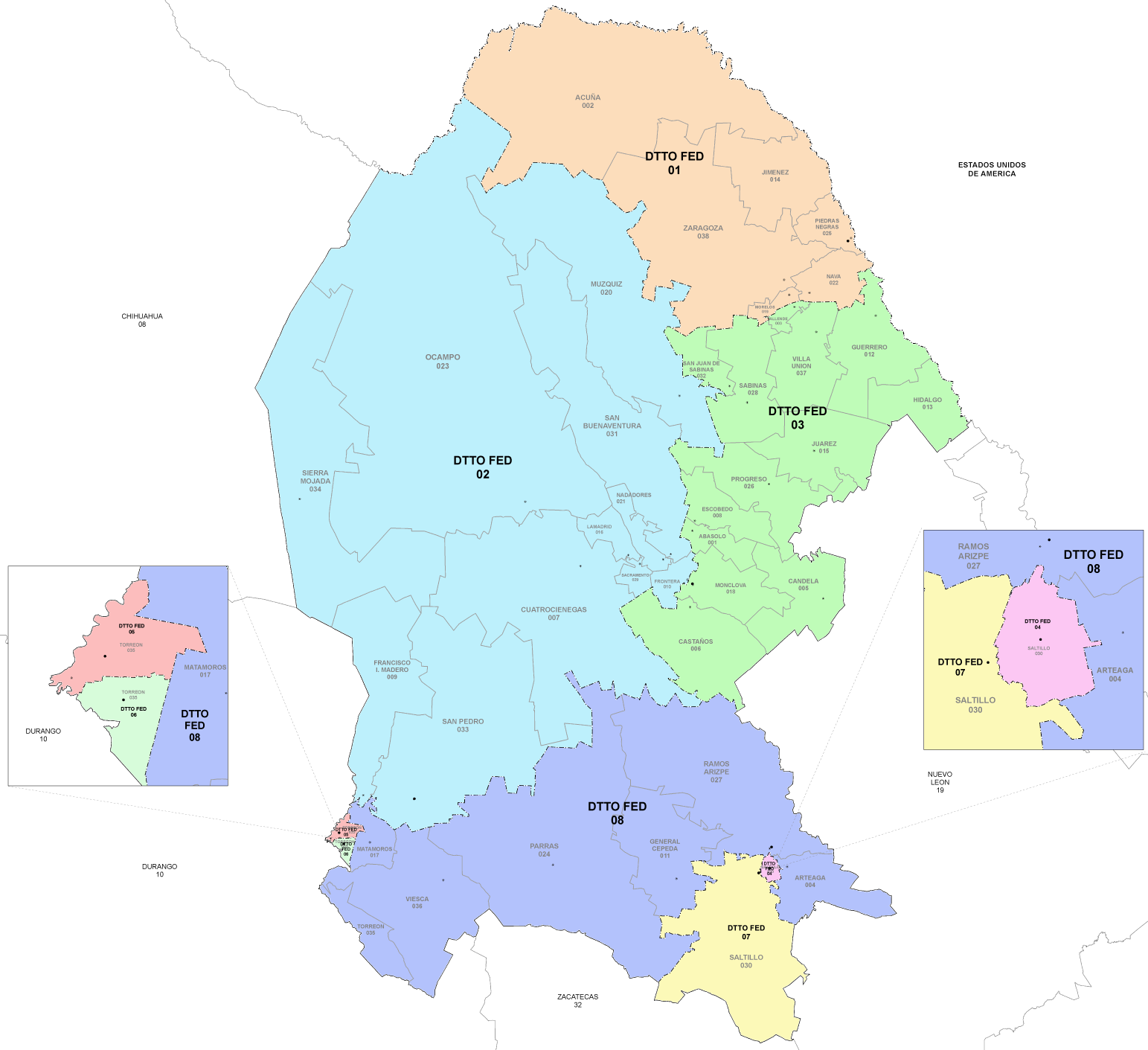
- 8th district since 2022

Incumbent
- Member: Hilda Magdalena Licerio Valdés
- Party: ▌Ecologist Green Party
- Congress: 66th (2024–2027)

District
- State: Coahuila
- Head town: Ramos Arizpe
- Coordinates: 25°32′N 100°57′W
- Covers: Arteaga, General Cepeda, Matamoros, Parras de la Fuente, Ramos Arizpe, Viesca, Torreón (part)
- PR region: Second
- Precincts: 205
- Population: 346,441 (2020 census)

The 8th federal electoral district of Coahuila (Spanish: Distrito electoral federal 08 de Coahuila) is one of the 300 electoral districts into which the territory of Mexico is divided for elections to the federal Chamber of Deputies and one of the eight districts in the state of Coahuila.

It elects one deputy to the lower house of Congress for each three-year legislative session by means of the first-past-the-post system. Votes cast in the district also count towards the calculation of proportional representation ("plurinominal") deputies elected from the second region.

It was created by the National Electoral Institute (INE) in its 2023 redistricting process and elected its first deputy, to the 66th Congress, in the 2024 general election. The inaugural member for the district is Hilda Magdalena Licerio Valdés of the Ecologist Green Party of Mexico (PVEM).

== District territory ==
Evolution of electoral district numbers
	1974	1978	1996	2005	2017	2023
Coahuila	4	7	7	7	7	8
Chamber of Deputies	196	300				

The 8th district is made up of 205 electoral precincts (secciones electorales) across the municipalities of Arteaga, General Cepeda, Matamoros, Parras de la Fuente, Ramos Arizpe, Viesca and Torreón's southern exclave. In it, there is an electoral registry of 251,491 people and a nominal list of 248,186 citizens.

The head town (cabecera distrital), where results from individual polling stations are gathered together and tallied, is the city of Ramos Arizpe. The district reported a population of 346,441 in the 2020 census.

== Deputies returned to Congress ==
(Mexico) National parties
- Current
- PAN
- PRI
- PT
- PVEM
- MC
- Morena
- PAZ
- Somos
- Defunct or local only
- PLM
- PNR
- PRM
- PNM
- PP
- PPS
- PARM
- PFCRN
- CON
- PANAL
- PSD
- PES
- PES
- PRD

Coahuila's 8th district
Election	Deputy	Party	Term	Legislature
2024	Hilda Magdalena Licerio Valdés		2024–2027	66th Congress

== Presidential elections ==
Coahuila's 8th district
Election	District won by	Party or coalition	%
2024	Claudia Sheinbaum Pardo	Sigamos Haciendo Historia	59.1021
