= San Pedro Municipality =

San Pedro Municipality may refer to:

- San Pedro Municipality, Pando, Manuripi Province, Bolivia
- San Pedro Municipality, Coahuila, Mexico
