= Licerio =

Licerio is a Spanish given name and surname. Notable people with the name include:

- Lycerius (died 548), Roman Catholic bishop and saint
- Licerio Gerónimo (1855–1924), general of the Philippine Revolutionary Forces
- Licerio Topacio (1839–1925), leader in the Philippine independence movement
- Hilda Magdalena Licerio Valdés (born 1993), Mexican politician
