= Manos Prietas =

Native American people

The Manos Prietas, meaning "black hands", were a Native American people from the region of present-day Texas and Mexico.

Spanish documents locate the Manos Prietas as native to the southern Coahuila region. Over the course of the seventeenth century, under pressure from encroaching Spanish settlements, they migrated north, across the Rio Grande, and onto the Edwards Plateau.

Their diet included deer and buffalo, prickly pear fruit, agave root, and nuts. They lived in round huts roofed with buffalo pelts.

Towards the end of the 17th century, surviving Manos Prietas entered a number of Spanish missions in Coahuila. These included Santa Rosa de Nadadores, San Miguel de Aguayo, and San Francisco Solano. The last records of Manos Prietas appear in 1793.
