= Jesús de la Rosa Godoy =

Mexican politician

- Born: 26 May 1954 (age 71); San Pedro, Coahuila, Mexico
- Occupation: Politician
- Political party: PRI

Jesús de la Rosa Godoy (born 26 May 1954) is a Mexican politician from the Institutional Revolutionary Party (PRI). From 2000 to 2003, during the 59th session of Congress, he served as a federal deputy representing Coahuila's second district.
