= Laguna del Rey =

Settlement in the Mexican state of Coahuila

Coordinates: 27°01′N 103°22′W

Laguna del Rey is a location under the authority of the municipality of Ocampo in the Mexican state of Coahuila. Laguna del Rey is located 210 kilometres north of the city of Torreón, Coahuila.

The area was settled during the mid-1950s because of the discovery of an underground aquifer with very large deposits of sodium sulfate. An industrial facility was built in order to exploit it. The deposit is now the property of Química del Rey, a company that processes the underground lagoons' minerals. The exploited sodium sulfate is used in the formulations of powder detergents.

This settlement has an air strip, railroad connections, a bank, hospital service and electrical connections.

The population of Laguna del Rey is around 3,500 inhabitants.
