= Santa Gertrudis, Coahuila =

Town in the Mexican state of Coahuila

Coordinates: 27°08′25″N 101°31′44″W

The small town of Santa Gertrudis lies in the municipality of San Buenaventura in the State of Coahuila, Mexico. The closest city is Monclova.

The town has a population of around 200 year-round residents, and 200 part-time residents. Santa Gertrudis is most populated during the summer or winter months when people that live in bigger cities in Mexico or the United States visit.

The 200+ year old town has existed since before the battle for Mexican Independence.

As of 2020, the town had a population of 247 people.
