= Jesús Zúñiga Romero =

Mexican politician

- Born: 3 June 1948 (age 77); Coahuila, Mexico
- Occupation: Politician
- Political party: PANAL

Jesús Zúñiga Romero (born 3 June 1949) is a Mexican politician affiliated with the New Alliance Party (PANAL). In 2003–2006 he served in the Chamber of Deputies during the 59th Congress, representing Coahuila's second district. On 16 March 2006 he announced he would sit as an independent.
