= Sacramento, Coahuila =

City in the Mexican state of Coahuila

Sacramento
- City
- Location in Mexico
- Coordinates: 27°0′13″N 101°43′29″W
- Country: Mexico
- State: Coahuila
- Municipality: Sacramento
- Founded: 1842
- Town status: 1862

Population (2020)
  - Total: 2,437

Sacramento is a city in the northern Mexican state of Coahuila. The city serves as the administrative centre for the surrounding municipality of the same name.

Sacramento is located at 27°00′13″N 101°43′29″W in the state's central region (Región Centro), some 250 km north of state capital Saltillo, and some 50 km north-west of former state capital Monclova, on Federal Highway 30.

It was founded in 1842 as Villa Nueva. It is believed to have changed its name to Sacramento ("sacrament") to honour a visit by Fr. Miguel Hidalgo during which he officiated a mass.

== Climate ==
Climate data for Sacramento (1991–2020)
Month	Jan	Feb	Mar	Apr	May	Jun	Jul	Aug	Sep	Oct	Nov	Dec	Year
Record high °C (°F)	45.0 (113.0)	40.0 (104.0)	40.0 (104.0)	45.0 (113.0)	45.0 (113.0)	48.0 (118.4)	48.0 (118.4)	45.0 (113.0)	47.0 (116.6)	45.0 (113.0)	45.0 (113.0)	42.0 (107.6)	48.0 (118.4)
Mean daily maximum °C (°F)	21.6 (70.9)	23.1 (73.6)	27.0 (80.6)	31.1 (88.0)	34.4 (93.9)	36.1 (97.0)	35.2 (95.4)	35.1 (95.2)	32.0 (89.6)	29.6 (85.3)	25.4 (77.7)	22.7 (72.9)	29.4 (84.9)
Daily mean °C (°F)	13.7 (56.7)	15.0 (59.0)	18.4 (65.1)	21.7 (71.1)	25.0 (77.0)	26.7 (80.1)	26.2 (79.2)	26.4 (79.5)	24.1 (75.4)	21.5 (70.7)	17.4 (63.3)	14.7 (58.5)	20.9 (69.6)
Mean daily minimum °C (°F)	5.9 (42.6)	6.9 (44.4)	9.9 (49.8)	12.4 (54.3)	15.7 (60.3)	17.4 (63.3)	17.2 (63.0)	17.7 (63.9)	16.3 (61.3)	13.5 (56.3)	9.4 (48.9)	6.8 (44.2)	12.4 (54.3)
Record low °C (°F)	−6.0 (21.2)	−5.0 (23.0)	−2.0 (28.4)	2.0 (35.6)	0.0 (32.0)	0.0 (32.0)	0.0 (32.0)	0.0 (32.0)	0.0 (32.0)	0.0 (32.0)	−4.0 (24.8)	−10.0 (14.0)	−10.0 (14.0)
Average precipitation mm (inches)	10.4 (0.41)	6.9 (0.27)	12.5 (0.49)	14.0 (0.55)	24.6 (0.97)	37.0 (1.46)	71.9 (2.83)	56.2 (2.21)	76.9 (3.03)	27.5 (1.08)	12.9 (0.51)	18.8 (0.74)	369.6 (14.55)
Average precipitation days (≥ 0.1 mm)	1.6	1.2	0.9	1.2	2.0	2.7	3.2	2.8	4.0	2.1	1.1	1.5	24.3
Source: Servicio Meteorologico Nacional
