= Sierra Mojada =

City in the Mexican state of Coahuila

- Municipal seat and city
- Location in Mexico
- Coordinates: 27°18′N 103°41′W
- Country: Mexico
- State: Coahuila
- Municipality: Sierra Mojada

Sierra Mojada is a city and seat of the municipality of Sierra Mojada, in the north-eastern Mexican state of Coahuila. Local oral tradition, documented by the priest James Lienert, states that Ambrose Bierce, who disappeared without a trace in 1913, was executed by firing squad in the town cemetery.

== Climate ==
Climate data for Sierra Mojada (1991–2020)
Month	Jan	Feb	Mar	Apr	May	Jun	Jul	Aug	Sep	Oct	Nov	Dec	Year
Record high °C (°F)	29.0 (84.2)	34.0 (93.2)	39.0 (102.2)	39.0 (102.2)	40.0 (104.0)	41.0 (105.8)	39.0 (102.2)	38.5 (101.3)	45.0 (113.0)	39.0 (102.2)	33.0 (91.4)	32.0 (89.6)	45.0 (113.0)
Mean daily maximum °C (°F)	16.7 (62.1)	19.3 (66.7)	22.9 (73.2)	27.0 (80.6)	30.0 (86.0)	31.4 (88.5)	30.2 (86.4)	29.4 (84.9)	26.8 (80.2)	24.7 (76.5)	20.7 (69.3)	17.1 (62.8)	24.7 (76.5)
Daily mean °C (°F)	10.4 (50.7)	12.6 (54.7)	15.4 (59.7)	19.0 (66.2)	22.0 (71.6)	23.4 (74.1)	22.7 (72.9)	22.1 (71.8)	19.8 (67.6)	17.5 (63.5)	13.5 (56.3)	10.7 (51.3)	17.4 (63.3)
Mean daily minimum °C (°F)	4.1 (39.4)	6.0 (42.8)	7.9 (46.2)	11.0 (51.8)	14.1 (57.4)	15.4 (59.7)	15.2 (59.4)	14.8 (58.6)	12.9 (55.2)	10.3 (50.5)	6.4 (43.5)	4.3 (39.7)	10.2 (50.4)
Record low °C (°F)	−12.0 (10.4)	−12.0 (10.4)	−10.0 (14.0)	−2.0 (28.4)	2.0 (35.6)	3.0 (37.4)	0.0 (32.0)	2.0 (35.6)	−1.0 (30.2)	−6.0 (21.2)	−12.0 (10.4)	−12.0 (10.4)	−12.0 (10.4)
Average precipitation mm (inches)	9.0 (0.35)	7.4 (0.29)	9.2 (0.36)	9.2 (0.36)	25.3 (1.00)	49.1 (1.93)	62.5 (2.46)	62.2 (2.45)	66.2 (2.61)	22.6 (0.89)	21.0 (0.83)	11.5 (0.45)	355.2 (13.98)
Average precipitation days (≥ 0.1 mm)	2.4	2.4	1.7	2.4	4.8	6.7	7.8	7.5	7.3	3.4	2.8	2.7	51.9
Source: Servicio Meteorologico Nacional
