= Valeria Souza =

Mexican scientist

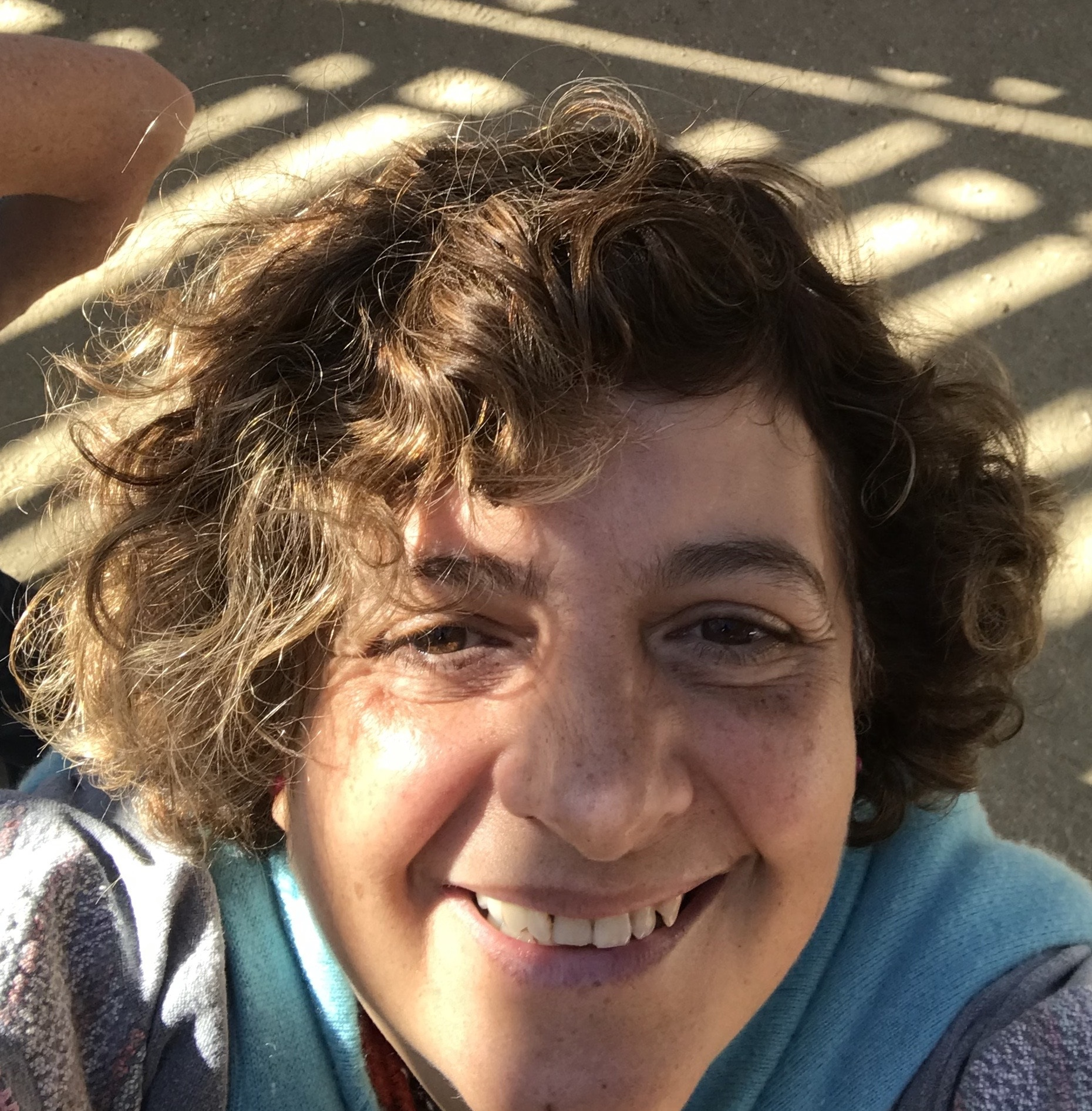
- Education: National Autonomous University of Mexico (B.S., M.S., & Ph.D.)
- Scientific career
- Fields: Microbiology, Evolutionary Biology
- Workplaces: National Autonomous University of Mexico

Valeria Francisca Eugenia Leopoldina de María de Guadalupe Souza Saldívar is a Mexican scientist who specializes in evolutionary and microbial ecology. She is a senior researcher in the Department of Evolutionary Ecology of the Institute of Ecology of the National Autonomous University of Mexico and a level III researcher in the National System of Researchers. She was the former president of the Scientific Society of Ecology of Mexico.

== Early education and career ==
Souza was born in Mexico City in 1958. Her father, Antonio Souza, was an art collector and critic who first discovered, in 1960, the painter Francisco Toledo. As an eight year old, she decided she wanted to become a biologist. Her interest in biology was further cemented after she was given a Time Life book to read about the discovery of DNA when she was ten years old. Souza received a B.S. in biology in 1983 and a Master's degree in biology in 1985 from the National Autonomous University of Mexico (UNAM). In 1990, also at UNAM, she received a Ph.D in microbial ecology from the Institute of Ecology (formerly known as the Ecology Center). She was a postdoctoral fellow from 1990-1992 in the Department of Ecology and Evolutionary Biology at the University of California, Irvine (UCI) with Richard Lenski where she worked on the long-term E. coli experiment. She continued her work with Lenski for one additional year at the Center for Microbial Ecology at Michigan State University following Lenski's move to Michigan from UCI. She is married to Dr. Luis Eguiarte, who is also a scientist.

== Research ==
Souza has 214 major publications and has received over 8600 citations. Her research focuses mainly on understanding the evolutionary, physiological, and ecological processes that are involved in the adaptation, speciation, and diversification of the biodiversity of microorganisms. Much of her research and conservation efforts focus on microbial mats and communities in Cuatro Ciénegas, Coahuila, Mexico. The work has revealed that microbes in these desert springs represent unique microbial lineages which she has worked to study and protect from groundwater extraction. As a result of multiple years of work in Cuatro Ciénegas the book "Cuatro Ciénegas, Ecology, Natural History and Microbiology" was published by Souza and her colleagues in 2018.

== Awards and honors ==
- 2020 Society for Freshwater Science Environmental Stewardship Award
- 2019 American Academy of Arts and Sciences (the fourth Mexican inducted overall and the first Mexican to do so in the Honorary Foreign Member category)
- 2016 Biology Professional Merit Medal by Board of Biologists of Mexico
- 2011 Aldo Leopold Fellowship of the Stanford Woods Institution
- 2011 Level III of the National System of Researchers
- 2010 ‘VW Love for the Planet’ award
- 2006 Sor Juana Inés de la Cruz Recognition from the National Autonomous University of Mexico
- 2006 National Conservation Award from the Ministry of the Environment and Natural Resources (SEMARNAT)
- 2003 PRIDE "D" level of the National Autonomous University of Mexico
- 1994 Winner of the MacArthur Foundation Fellowship
