= Hugo Héctor Martínez González =

Mexican politician

- Born: 17 May 1966 (age 60); Coahuila, Mexico
- Occupation: Politician
- Political party: PRI

Hugo Héctor Martínez González (born 17 May 1966) is a Mexican politician from the Institutional Revolutionary Party (PRI). From 2009 to 2012 he served in the Chamber of Deputies during the 61st Congress, representing Coahuila's second district.
