= Gambusia longispinis =

Conservation status
- Endangered (IUCN 3.1)

Scientific classification
- Kingdom: Animalia
- Phylum: Chordata
- Class: Actinopterygii
- Order: Cyprinodontiformes
- Family: Poeciliidae
- Genus: Gambusia
- Species: G. longispinis

Binomial name
- Gambusia longispinis W. L. Minckley, 1962

Species of fish

Gambusia longispinis, the Cuatrociengas gambusia (also locally called the Guayacon de Cuatro Cienegas), is an endangered species of fish in the family Poeciliidae. It is endemic to Cuatro Ciénegas in Mexico.
