= Cuatro Ciénegas =

City in the Mexican state of Coahuila

- City
- Cuatro Ciénegas de Carranza
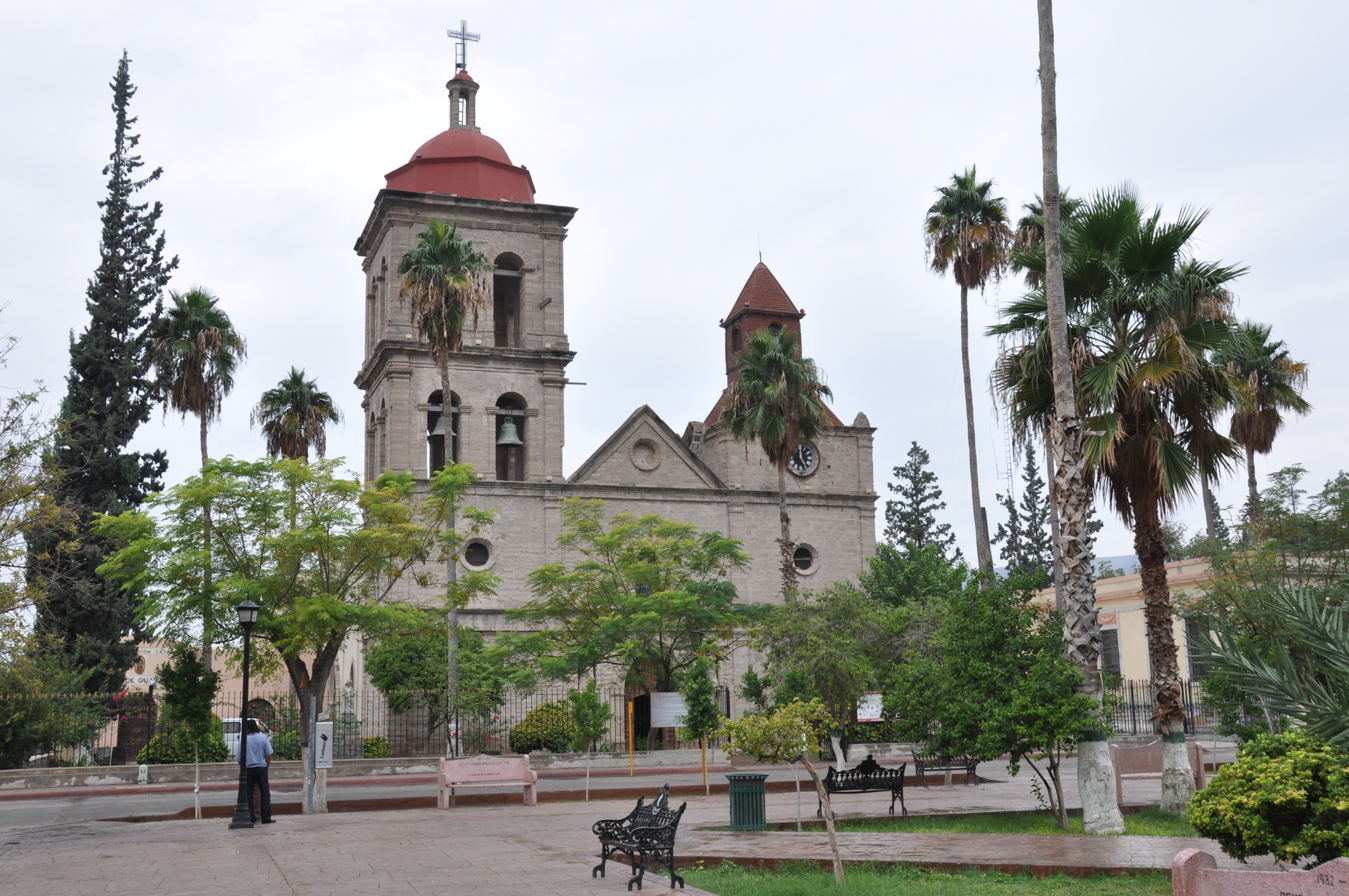
- Saint Joseph Parish

- Location in Mexico Cuatro Ciénegas (Mexico)
- Coordinates: 26°59′10″N 102°3′59″W
- Country: Mexico
- State: Coahuila
- Municipality: Cuatrociénegas
- Founded: 1800

Population (2020)
  - Total: 12,715

Cuatro Ciénegas (Spanish pronunciation: [ˈkwatɾo ˈsjeneɣas]) is a city in the northern Mexican state of Coahuila. It stands at an average elevation of 740 metres (2,430 ft) above sea level. The city serves as the municipal seat for the surrounding municipality of the same name.

It is located in the state's desert region (Región Desierto). Cuatro Ciénegas is Spanish for "four marshes"; the name was chosen by the first settlers because of the natural springs in the vicinity that create extensive areas of wetland and lakes.

Archeological excavations indicate settlement in the area from approximately 5000 years ago, as well as ritual use of peyote by the inhabitants.

Several failed settlements were founded here prior to the successful establishment of a town by Antonio Cordero y Bustamante on 24 May 1800. The settlement's original name was Nuestra Señora de los Dolores y Cuatro Ciénegas, which was later changed to Villa Venustiano Carranza, before finally settling on its current name.

The city is formally known as Cuatro Ciénegas de Carranza, in honour of its most famous son: Venustiano Carranza, President of Mexico from 1915 to 1920, who was born there in 1859.

The municipality reported 12,154 inhabitants in the year 2000 census.

== Cuatro Ciénegas Basin ==
Designations

Ramsar Wetland
- Official name: Área de Protección de Flora y Fauna Cuatrociénegas
- Designated: 22 June 1995
- Reference no.: 734

"Poza Azul" pool

The Cuatro Ciénegas Basin (CCB) is an official nature reserve in Mexico. The basin has inflowing rivers and streams from the near region, but it is endorheic (no natural outflow); a number of artificial channels leading water out of it have been made for irrigation and in prehistoric times it was part of the Rio Grande (Rio Bravo) basin. The nature reserves are small ecosystems with unique fauna and flora that are highly protected by government authorities. NASA has stated that the Cuatro Ciénegas Basin could have strong links to discovering life on Mars, since the adaptability of bioforms in the region was unique in the world. There are some 150 different plants and animals endemic to the valley and its surrounding mountains (e.g., Fouquieria shrevei). Among the many aquatic species in the Reserve are three endemic turtles (Coahuilan box turtle, Cuatro Ciénegas slider and Cuatro Cienegas softshell), eight endemic fish (Minckley's cichlid, Cuatro Cienegas shiner, Tufa darter, Bolson pupfish, Cuatro Cienegas pupfish, Cuatrociengas gambusia, Cuatrocienegas killifish and northern platyfish), and several endemic crustaceans and gastropods, especially hydrobiid freshwater snails.

Live stromatolites inhabit Cuatro Ciénegas' pools. These are colonies of certain types of cyanobacteria, extinct in most of the world, linked to the origin of an oxygen rich atmosphere over 3 billion years ago. A tiny copepod crustacean, Leptocaris stromatolicolus, is known only from the interstices of these stromatolites and bottom sediments in the saline pools.

The pools are an oligotrophic environment with little available phosphate, leading one local bacterial species, Bacillus coahuilensis, to acquire the genes necessary to partially replace its membrane phospholipids with sulfolipids through horizontal gene transfer.

Several environmental conservation leaders are working to protect the valley, including Pronatura Noreste. The organization owns a private reserve, called Pozas Azules, and has several ongoing projects that include the protection of native species, including stromatolites and the eradication of invasive flora and fauna, as well as community development and water efficient agriculture combined with organic techniques.

== Tourism ==
Cuatro Ciénegas has several natural tourist attractions, including white dunes and many wetlands which have unique ecosystems. The most famous natural attractions are:

=== Poza Azul ===
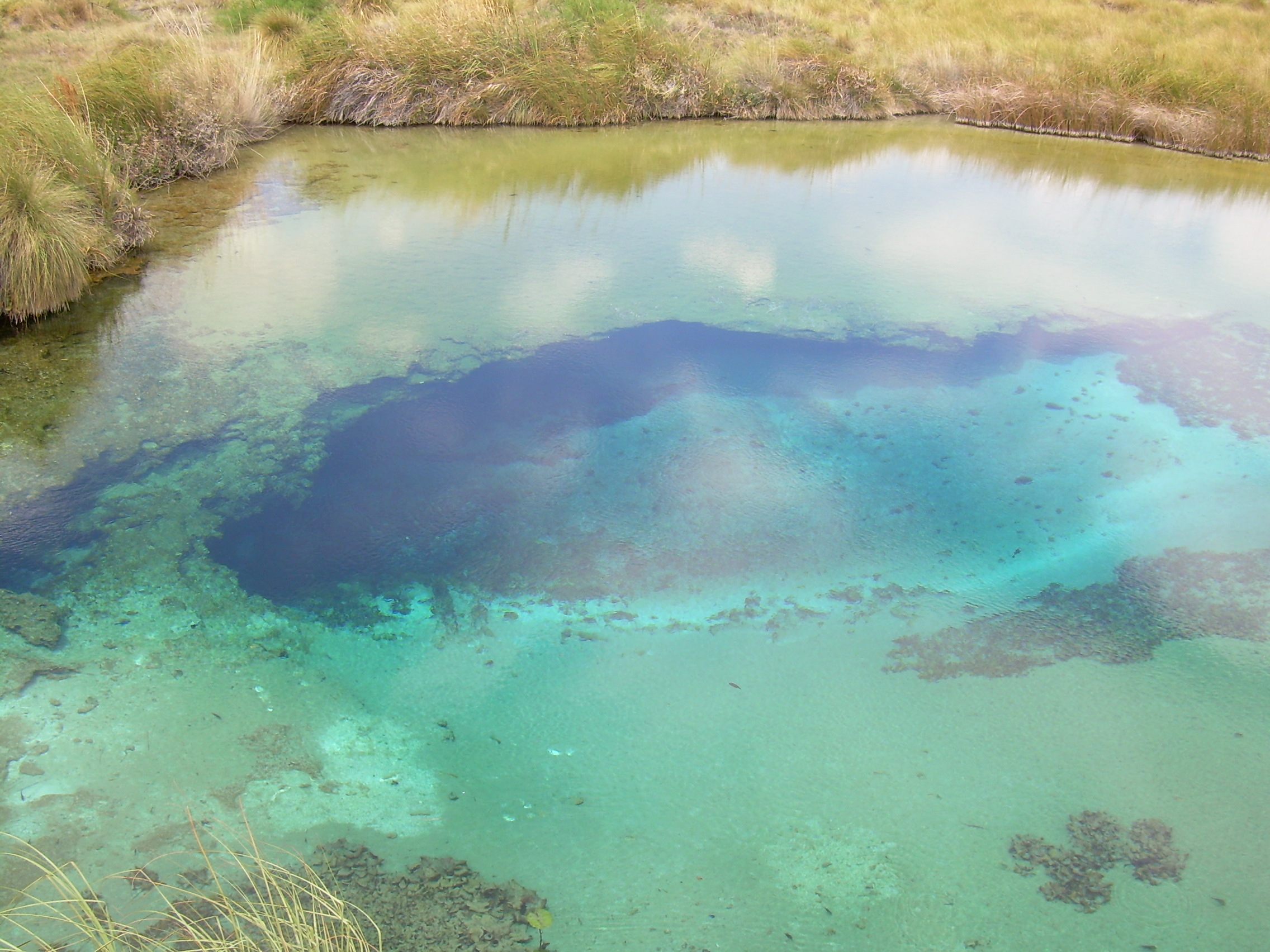
Poza Azul.

Poza Azul is a protected wetland, located 9 km (5.6 mi) from Cuatrociénegas seat. It is one of the best known wetlands in Cuatrociénegas. There is a photographic exhibition hall of the flora and fauna of the reserve, viewing platforms, and self-guided trails.

=== La Poza de la Becerra ===
La Poza de la Becerra (Spanish: The Pool of the Calf) is located 16 km (9.9 mi) from the county seat, on road number 30 Cuatrociénegas-Torreon. It is part of the biosphere reserve of Cuatrociénegas. The area contains many species endemic to the region.

=== Poza Churince ===
Poza Churince is located 18 km (11 mi) from the Cuatrociénegas seat by the federal highway 30 Cuatrociénegas-Torreon. It is an area of spring waters and varying temperatures.

=== Las Playitas ===
Las Playitas is a large extension of wetlands located close to the municipal seat.

=== White dunes ===
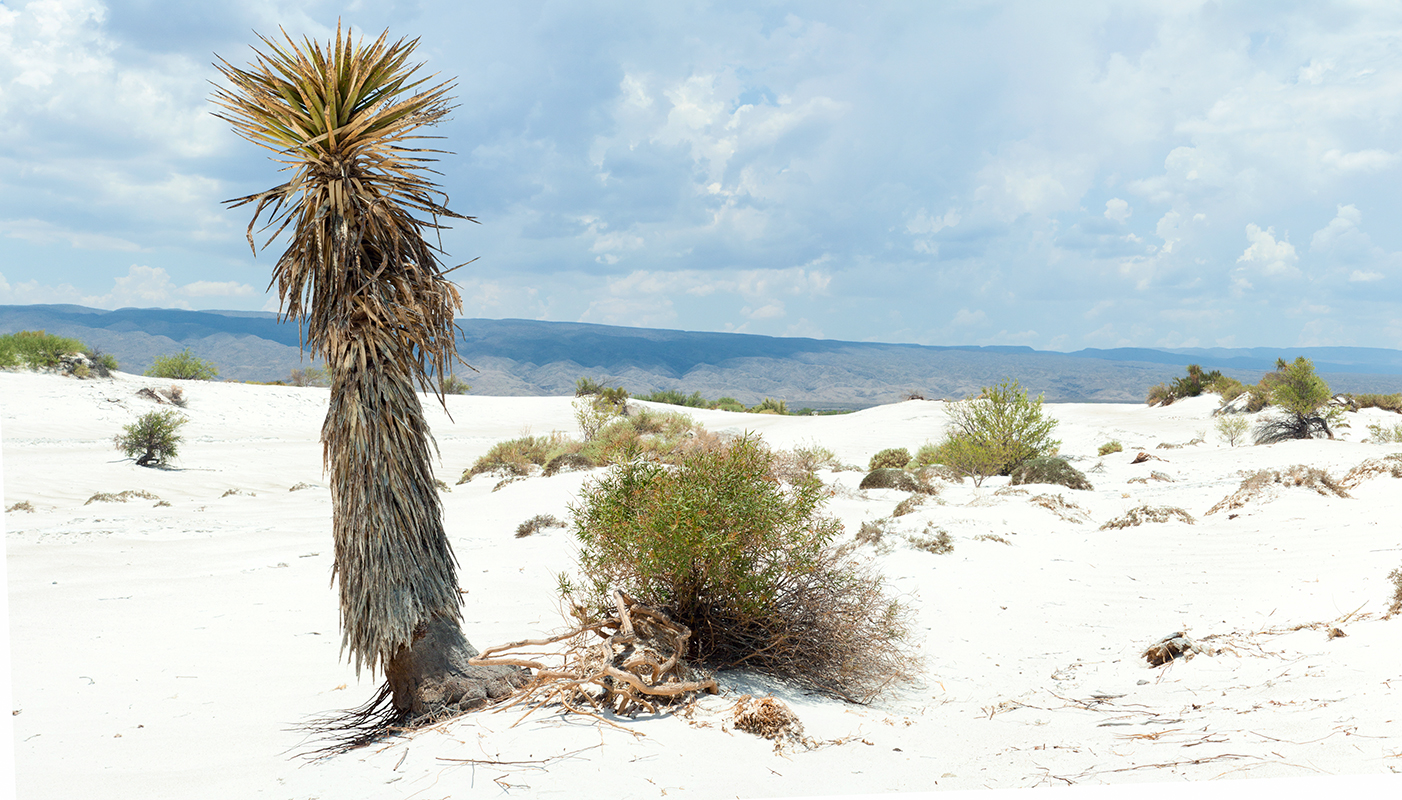
"Las Dunas de Yeso" in Cuatrociénegas.

Also known in Spanish as "Las Dunas de Yeso," white dunes cover a large area of white sand that consists of calcium sulfate. They are considered the largest in the country, and the third largest in the Americas.

=== Other tourist attractions ===
Other featured wetlands include "Nogalito" and the ecotouristic park "La Ilusión," as well as El Entronque and El Mesquite resorts. The Sierra de la Campana, a mountain range with a huge crater called El hundido, is also a tourist attraction. Cuatro Cienégas is also an important wine-making region; the winery Bodegas Ferriño, founded by a 19th-century Italian immigrant near the town of Cuatro Ciénegas, is the second largest producer of wine in Coahuila. The site attracts many visitors who are immersed in the process of making wine and it offers guide tours around the Cuatro Ciénegas valley.

== Aquifer and surface water ==
Scientists working in the basin and some local residents claim to have observed reduced spring discharge and a decrease in surface water in the Cuatro Ciénegas Basin (CCB) in recent years, although these changes have not been well documented in the scientific literature. Some have blamed the possible drying out on changes in climate and others have ascribed it to the introduction of large scale agriculture in adjacent valleys over the past two decades.

Valeria Souza, an ecology professor and researcher at the National Autonomous University of Mexico, found that based on genetic studies of microbes in the CCB and surrounding valleys, the aquifer extends far beyond the CCB and includes adjacent valleys. She published her results in the Proceedings of the National Academy of Sciences in April 2006. Regarding the source of drying out, she wrote: "Similar to situations occurring with increasing frequency in various arid regions of the world, agricultural development and associated water extraction in the region have placed new pressures on the ecological integrity of the unique ecosystems of Cuatro Ciénegas."

Research by hydrogeologist Brad Wolaver at the University of Texas at Austin, now at Flinders University, also found evidence that the aquifer supplying the water that emerges at the surface of the Cuatro Ciénegas Basin extends far beyond the basin and thus is potentially impacted by agricultural water extraction in adjacent valleys.

== Climate ==
Climate data for Cuatro Cienegas (1991–2020)
Month	Jan	Feb	Mar	Apr	May	Jun	Jul	Aug	Sep	Oct	Nov	Dec	Year
Record high °C (°F)	37.0 (98.6)	44.0 (111.2)	41.0 (105.8)	48.0 (118.4)	48.0 (118.4)	47.0 (116.6)	43.0 (109.4)	43.0 (109.4)	45.0 (113.0)	43.0 (109.4)	40.0 (104.0)	36.0 (96.8)	48.0 (118.4)
Mean daily maximum °C (°F)	21.2 (70.2)	24.2 (75.6)	28.1 (82.6)	31.5 (88.7)	34.6 (94.3)	35.9 (96.6)	35.1 (95.2)	35.4 (95.7)	32.2 (90.0)	29.6 (85.3)	25.0 (77.0)	20.7 (69.3)	29.5 (85.1)
Daily mean °C (°F)	13.4 (56.1)	16.1 (61.0)	19.9 (67.8)	23.5 (74.3)	27.3 (81.1)	29.3 (84.7)	29.0 (84.2)	29.3 (84.7)	26.2 (79.2)	22.6 (72.7)	17.5 (63.5)	13.3 (55.9)	22.3 (72.1)
Mean daily minimum °C (°F)	5.7 (42.3)	7.9 (46.2)	11.6 (52.9)	15.5 (59.9)	19.9 (67.8)	22.6 (72.7)	22.8 (73.0)	23.2 (73.8)	20.3 (68.5)	15.7 (60.3)	10.0 (50.0)	5.8 (42.4)	15.1 (59.2)
Record low °C (°F)	−6.0 (21.2)	−8.0 (17.6)	−2.0 (28.4)	1.0 (33.8)	5.0 (41.0)	5.0 (41.0)	13.0 (55.4)	15.0 (59.0)	9.0 (48.2)	0.0 (32.0)	−9.0 (15.8)	−10.0 (14.0)	−10.0 (14.0)
Average precipitation mm (inches)	9.2 (0.36)	6.1 (0.24)	8.1 (0.32)	7.2 (0.28)	19.7 (0.78)	29.4 (1.16)	34.2 (1.35)	27.0 (1.06)	49.4 (1.94)	17.8 (0.70)	9.4 (0.37)	10.0 (0.39)	227.5 (8.96)
Average precipitation days (≥ 0.1 mm)	2.3	1.7	1.3	1.5	4.3	4.2	4.7	3.8	6.1	3.1	2.0	2.5	37.5
Source: Servicio Meteorologico Nacional

== See also ==
- Cienega
