= San Buenaventura, Coahuila =

Town in the Mexican state of Coahuila

San Buenaventura
- Municipal seat
- Location in Mexico
- Coordinates: 27°3′45″N 101°32′48″W
- Country: Mexico
- State: Coahuila
- Municipality: San Buenaventura

"San Buenaventura" is also the official name of the city in Southern California, United States, normally referred to as Ventura, California. It can also refer to Mission San Buenaventura.

San Buenaventura is a town and seat of the surrounding municipality of the same name in the northern Mexican state of Coahuila. It is located at 27°03′45″N 101°32′48″W, in the state's central region (Región Centro). There were 19,986 inhabitants in 2000.
