= Viesca =

Town in the Mexican state of Coahuila

- Municipal seat
- Location in Coahuila
- Coordinates: 25°21′N 102°48′W
- Country: Mexico
- State: Coahuila
- Municipality: Viesca
- Established: 24 July 1731

Population (2005)
  - Total: 19,328

Viesca (Spanish pronunciation: [ˈbjeska]) is a town and seat of the surrounding municipality of the same name, located in the northern Mexican state of Coahuila. Named after the third governor of Coahuila and Texas, José María Viesca, Viesca had a population of 19,328 at the last census. Of this number 9,695 were men and 9,633 were women.

== Economy ==
Viesca's primary economic activity was formerly a salt factory which provided most of the jobs in town. The factory was shut down in 1992. Today, the main workplaces are the auto parts assembly factories that still operate giving jobs for most of the economic activity.

== Climate ==
Climate data for Viesca (1991–2020)
Month	Jan	Feb	Mar	Apr	May	Jun	Jul	Aug	Sep	Oct	Nov	Dec	Year
Record high °C (°F)	42.0 (107.6)	44.0 (111.2)	44.0 (111.2)	45.0 (113.0)	46.0 (114.8)	46.0 (114.8)	46.0 (114.8)	46.6 (115.9)	46.0 (114.8)	43.0 (109.4)	41.0 (105.8)	37.0 (98.6)	46.6 (115.9)
Mean daily maximum °C (°F)	24.0 (75.2)	27.5 (81.5)	30.8 (87.4)	34.6 (94.3)	37.3 (99.1)	37.7 (99.9)	36.7 (98.1)	36.4 (97.5)	33.7 (92.7)	31.8 (89.2)	28.0 (82.4)	24.3 (75.7)	31.9 (89.4)
Daily mean °C (°F)	14.8 (58.6)	17.8 (64.0)	21.0 (69.8)	25.0 (77.0)	28.3 (82.9)	30.0 (86.0)	29.7 (85.5)	29.3 (84.7)	26.6 (79.9)	23.5 (74.3)	18.9 (66.0)	15.3 (59.5)	23.4 (74.1)
Mean daily minimum °C (°F)	5.6 (42.1)	8.1 (46.6)	11.1 (52.0)	15.3 (59.5)	19.3 (66.7)	22.3 (72.1)	22.6 (72.7)	22.1 (71.8)	19.5 (67.1)	15.2 (59.4)	9.7 (49.5)	6.2 (43.2)	14.8 (58.6)
Record low °C (°F)	−13.0 (8.6)	−9.0 (15.8)	−7.0 (19.4)	−4.0 (24.8)	1.0 (33.8)	6.0 (42.8)	2.2 (36.0)	2.4 (36.3)	1.0 (33.8)	1.0 (33.8)	−8.0 (17.6)	−10.0 (14.0)	−13.0 (8.6)
Average precipitation mm (inches)	10.9 (0.43)	4.3 (0.17)	5.8 (0.23)	2.9 (0.11)	6.7 (0.26)	20.6 (0.81)	19.4 (0.76)	19.8 (0.78)	36.5 (1.44)	13.9 (0.55)	6.1 (0.24)	6.2 (0.24)	153.1 (6.03)
Average precipitation days (≥ 0.1 mm)	1.7	0.8	1.0	0.6	1.3	2.9	3.8	3.0	3.8	2.4	1.3	1.4	24.0
Source: Servicio Meteorologico Nacional
