= Tufa darter =

Conservation status
- Critically Endangered (IUCN 3.1)

Scientific classification
- Kingdom: Animalia
- Phylum: Chordata
- Class: Actinopterygii
- Order: Perciformes
- Family: Percidae
- Genus: Etheostoma
- Species: E. lugoi

Binomial name
- Etheostoma lugoi (Norris & Minckley, 1997)

Species of fish

The Tufa darter (Etheostoma lugoi) is a species of freshwater ray-finned fish, a darter from the subfamily Etheostomatinae, part of the family Percidae, which also contains the perches, ruffes and pikeperches. It is endemic to Rio Mesquites and its tributaries in Bolson de Cuatro Cienegas, Mexico. It inhabits unvegetated river bottoms made of gravel to cobble-sized fragments of tufa and tufa stromatolites. This species can reach a length of 3.8 cm (1.5 in). The specific name, lugoi, is in honor of José "Pepe" Lugo Guajardo for his contributions to the studies of the Cuatro Ciénegas Basin fauna.
