= Ana María Boone Godoy =

Mexican politician

- Born: 1 April 1964 (age 62); Nueva Rosita, Coahuila, Mexico
- Occupation: Politician
- Political party: Institutional Revolutionary Party

Ana María Boone Godoy (born April 1, 1964) is a Mexican politician from the Institutional Revolutionary Party (PRI). She served in the Chamber of Deputies for the LXIII Legislature of the Mexican Congress from the Second Federal Electoral District of Coahuila.

== Life ==
Boone received an undergraduate degree in early childhood education from the National Pedagogic University and worked as a normal school professor at the Labastida Superior Normal School. She also joined Section 39 of the SNTE.

Most of Boone's public service positions have been in the town of San Juan de Sabinas, where she directed the DIF and was a town councilor from 2003 to 2005. Similarly, she was deputy director of educational services for Sabinas and the nearby town of Múzquiz between 2010 and 2011.

=== Legislative career ===
In 2012, voters sent Boone Godoy to the LIX Legislature of Coahuila, where she spent two years as a deputy and served as the secretary of the chamber's board of directors.

Boone became a federal deputy in 2015 after she received 50 percent of the votes from Coahuila's second district, far ahead of the second-place candidate with just 15 percent. She serves as the Secretary of the Radio and Television Commission and also serves on the Children's Rights and Equity and Gender Commissions.

== Personal ==
Boone is involved in additional nonpolitical activities, including her role as the chairwoman and spokesperson of the Nueva Esperanza (New Hope) orphanage in Nueva Rosita, as well as part ownership of Radio Triunfadora de Coahuila, S.A. de C.V., the concessionaire of radio station XHWQ-FM in Monclova. Her father, Daniel Boone Menchaca, holds the concession for XHENR-FM, a radio station in Nueva Rosita.

Boone Godoy has two children, Ana Daniela and Annette.
