= Ciudad Frontera =

Town in the Mexican state of Coahuila

- Municipal seat
- Location in Mexico
- Coordinates: 26°55′36″N 101°27′9″W
- Country: Mexico
- State: Coahuila
- Municipality: Frontera

Population (2020)
  - Total: 75,242

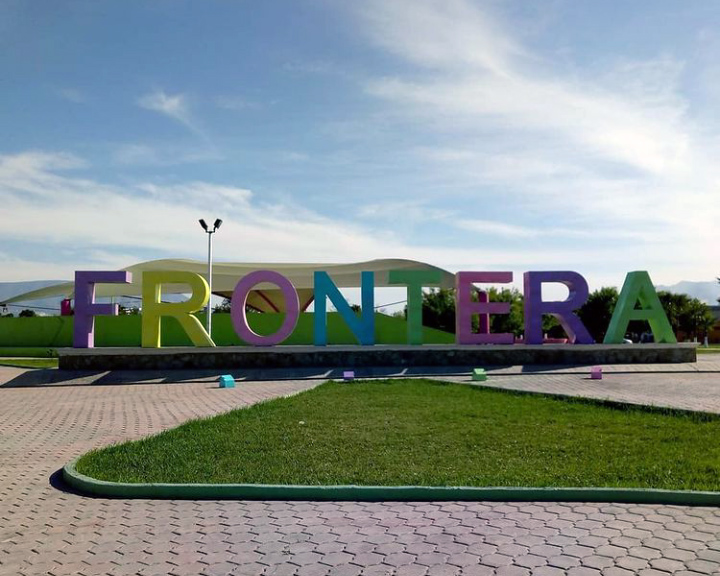

Ciudad Frontera is a town in the northern Mexican state of Coahuila. It is in the east-central part of the state, just west of the city of Monclova. It is located in the state's central region (Región Centro).

There were 65,606 inhabitants in the city as of the 2005 census, making it the state's sixth-largest community. The city serves as municipal seat of its surrounding municipality, which had a population of 70,160 and includes numerous small outlying communities such as Ocho de Enero. The municipality is part of the Monclova-Frontera metropolitan area.
