= Lamadrid =

Town in the Mexican state of Coahuila

- Municipal seat
- Location in Mexico
- Coordinates: 27°2′59″N 101°47′41″W
- Country: Mexico
- State: Coahuila
- Municipality: Lamadrid

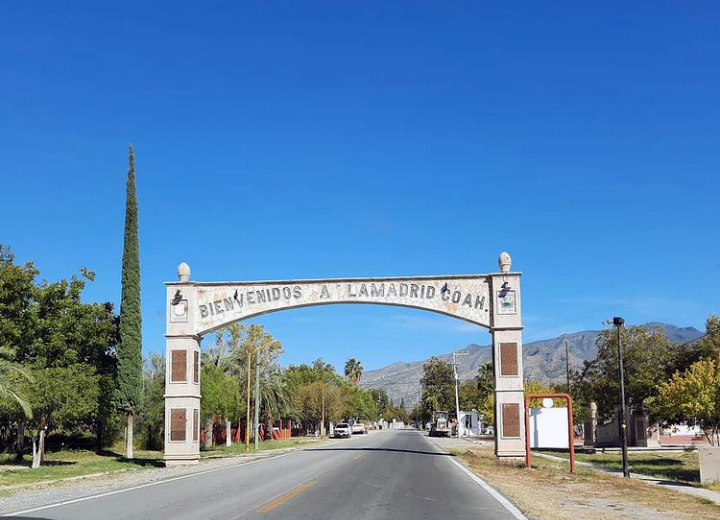
Lamadrid’s arch-shaped welcome sign

Lamadrid is a town in the northern Mexican state of Coahuila. It is the seat of the municipality of Lamadrid. There were 1,780 inhabitants in 2000.
