= Hilda Magdalena Licerio Valdés =

Mexican politician (born 1993)

Hilda Magdalena Licerio Valdés (born 30 August 1993) is a Mexican politician from the Ecologist Green Party of Mexico (PVEM).

Licerio Valdés is a native of Matamoros, Coahuila. In the 2024 election, she was elected to the Chamber of Deputies for the newly created 8th federal electoral district of Coahuila.

== See also ==
- LXVI Legislature of the Mexican Congress
