= Francisco I. Madero, Coahuila =

City in the Mexican state of Coahuila

Francisco I. Madero
- City
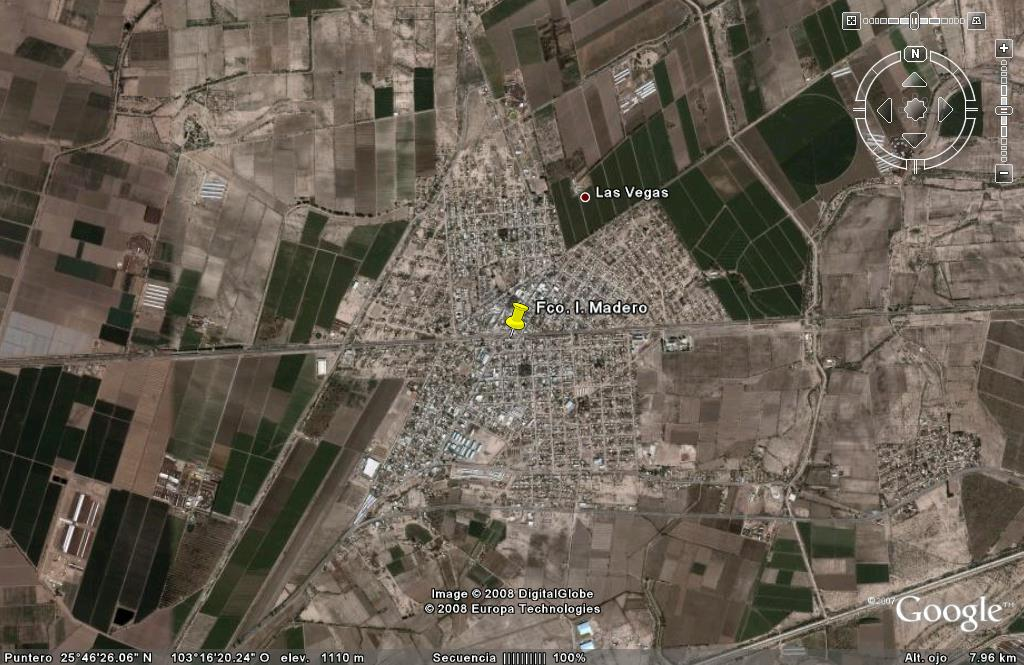
- Aerial view of Francisco I. Madero

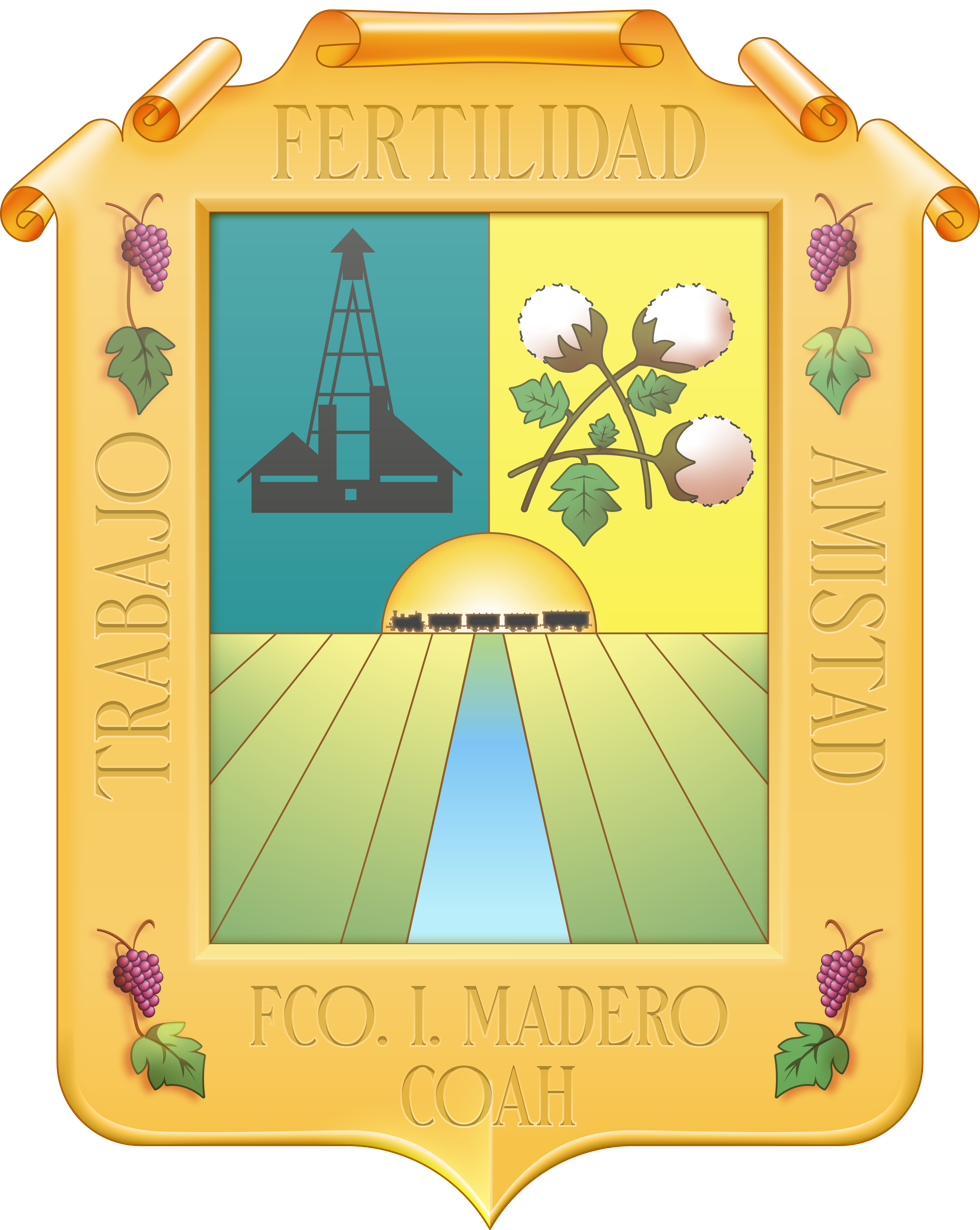
- Coat of arms

- Location in Mexico
- Coordinates: 25°46′31″N 103°16′23″W
- Country: Mexico
- State: Coahuila
- Municipality: Francisco I. Madero
- First settled: 1895
- Town status: 30 November 1936
- City status: 30 November 1986
- Elevation: 1,100 m (3,600 ft)

Population (2005)
  - Total: 50,084
- Postal code: 27900
- Area code: 872
- Website: www.fimcoahuila.gob.mx

Francisco I. Madero is a city in the northern Mexican state of Coahuila. It is located at the southwestern part of the state near the Durango state border, in the economic region known as Laguna at 25°46′31″N 103°16′23″W, at a mean height of 1,100 m (3,600 ft) above sea level. It serves as the municipal seat for the Francisco I. Madero Municipality, Coahuila.

It is named for Revolutionary hero Francisco I. Madero, a native of nearby Parras de la Fuente.

The city is located 200 km (120 mi) from the state capital, Saltillo. It had a 2005 census population of 30,084, while its surrounding municipality had a total population of 51,528.
