= Nadadores =

City in the Mexican state of Coahuila

- Municipal seat
- Location in Mexico
- Coordinates: 27°3′48″N 101°35′37″W
- Country: Mexico
- State: Coahuila
- Municipality: Nadadores

Nadadores is a city in the northern Mexican state of Coahuila. it serves as the administrative centre for the surrounding municipality of the same name.

Nadadores is located at 27°3′48″N 101°35′37″W, in the state's central region (Región Centro). It stands some 30 km north-west of former state capital Monclova on Federal Highway 30.

There were 5,949 inhabitants in 2000.

It is the location of an accidental detonation of 22 tons of Ammonium Nitrate, which left 28 dead and 250 injured on September 10, 2007 .. The explosion left a crater 23m wide and 3m deep, and a damage radius of about 500m.
