= Ocampo, Coahuila =

City in the Mexican state of Coahuila

Ocampo O’Campo
- Municipal seat and city
- Nickname(s): Camp of Ocampo, Coahuila, United States of America-Mexico
- Location in Mexico Ocampo (Coahuila) Ocampo (North America) Ocampo (Earth)
- Coordinates: 27°18′50″N 102°23′50″W
- Country: Mexico
- State: Coahuila
- Municipality: Ocampo
- Elevation: 1,116 m (3,661 ft)

Population (2010)
  - Total: 3,679

Ocampo is a city and seat of the municipality of Ocampo, in the north-eastern Mexican state of Coahuila. It had a population of 3,679 inhabitants in the 2010 census, representing over one-third of the municipality's population.

== Climate ==
Climate data for Ocampo (1991–2020)
Month	Jan	Feb	Mar	Apr	May	Jun	Jul	Aug	Sep	Oct	Nov	Dec	Year
Record high °C (°F)	35.0 (95.0)	37.0 (98.6)	49.0 (120.2)	43.0 (109.4)	44.0 (111.2)	48.0 (118.4)	42.0 (107.6)	46.0 (114.8)	40.0 (104.0)	39.0 (102.2)	41.0 (105.8)	34.0 (93.2)	49.0 (120.2)
Mean daily maximum °C (°F)	18.4 (65.1)	21.5 (70.7)	25.5 (77.9)	29.1 (84.4)	32.7 (90.9)	34.1 (93.4)	33.4 (92.1)	32.6 (90.7)	29.8 (85.6)	25.7 (78.3)	20.7 (69.3)	18.2 (64.8)	26.8 (80.2)
Daily mean °C (°F)	10.6 (51.1)	13.2 (55.8)	16.5 (61.7)	20.1 (68.2)	24.1 (75.4)	26.1 (79.0)	25.9 (78.6)	25.5 (77.9)	23.2 (73.8)	18.8 (65.8)	13.8 (56.8)	10.6 (51.1)	19.0 (66.2)
Mean daily minimum °C (°F)	2.8 (37.0)	4.9 (40.8)	7.5 (45.5)	11.1 (52.0)	15.5 (59.9)	18.2 (64.8)	18.5 (65.3)	18.4 (65.1)	16.5 (61.7)	11.9 (53.4)	7.0 (44.6)	3.0 (37.4)	11.3 (52.3)
Record low °C (°F)	−9.0 (15.8)	−11.0 (12.2)	−8.0 (17.6)	0.0 (32.0)	1.0 (33.8)	5.0 (41.0)	7.0 (44.6)	10.0 (50.0)	2.0 (35.6)	−4.0 (24.8)	−5.0 (23.0)	−12.0 (10.4)	−12.0 (10.4)
Average precipitation mm (inches)	12.3 (0.48)	5.6 (0.22)	11.5 (0.45)	18.6 (0.73)	49.4 (1.94)	57.5 (2.26)	72.6 (2.86)	44.3 (1.74)	61.9 (2.44)	27.3 (1.07)	23.4 (0.92)	12.5 (0.49)	396.9 (15.6)
Average precipitation days (≥ 0.1 mm)	2.0	1.1	1.3	2.0	4.2	4.3	5.1	4.5	5.7	2.7	1.7	2.0	36.6
Source: Servicio Meteorologico Nacional
