= Ramos Arizpe Municipality =

Municipality in the Mexican state of Coahuila

Ramos Arizpe
- Municipality
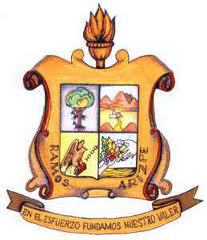
- Coat of arms

- Municipality of Ramos Arizpe in Coahuila

- Location in Mexico
- Coordinates: 25°32′26″N 100°57′2″W
- Country: Mexico
- State: Coahuila
- Municipal seat: Ramos Arizpe

Area
  - Total: 5,306.6 km^{2} (2,048.9 sq mi)

Population (2020)
  - Total: 122,243

Ramos Arizpe is one of the 38 municipalities of Coahuila, in north-eastern Mexico in the metropolitan area of Saltillo. The municipality covers an area of 5306.6 km^{2}.

As of 2020, the municipality had a total population of 122,243.

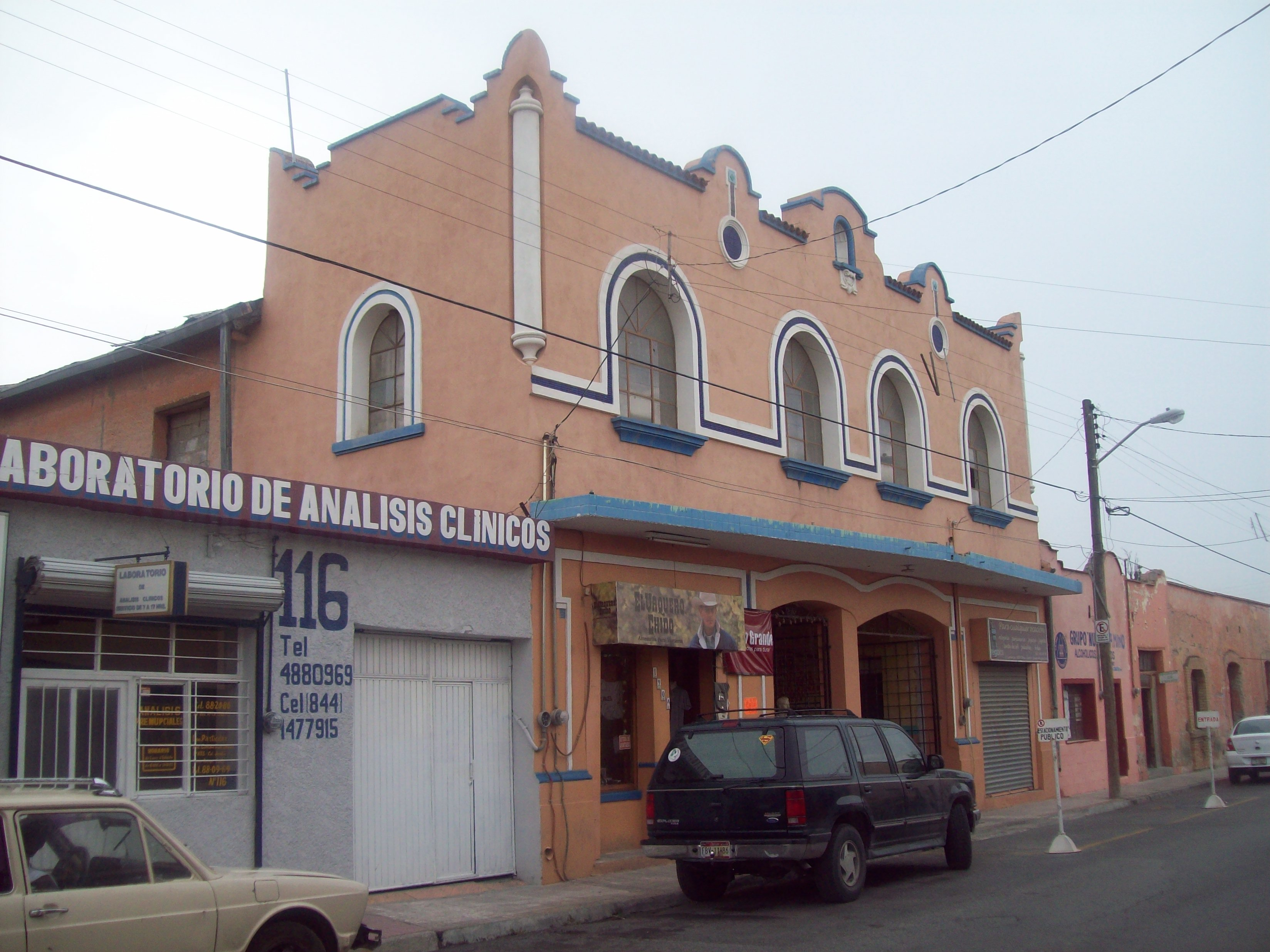
Old cinema in Ramos Arizpe

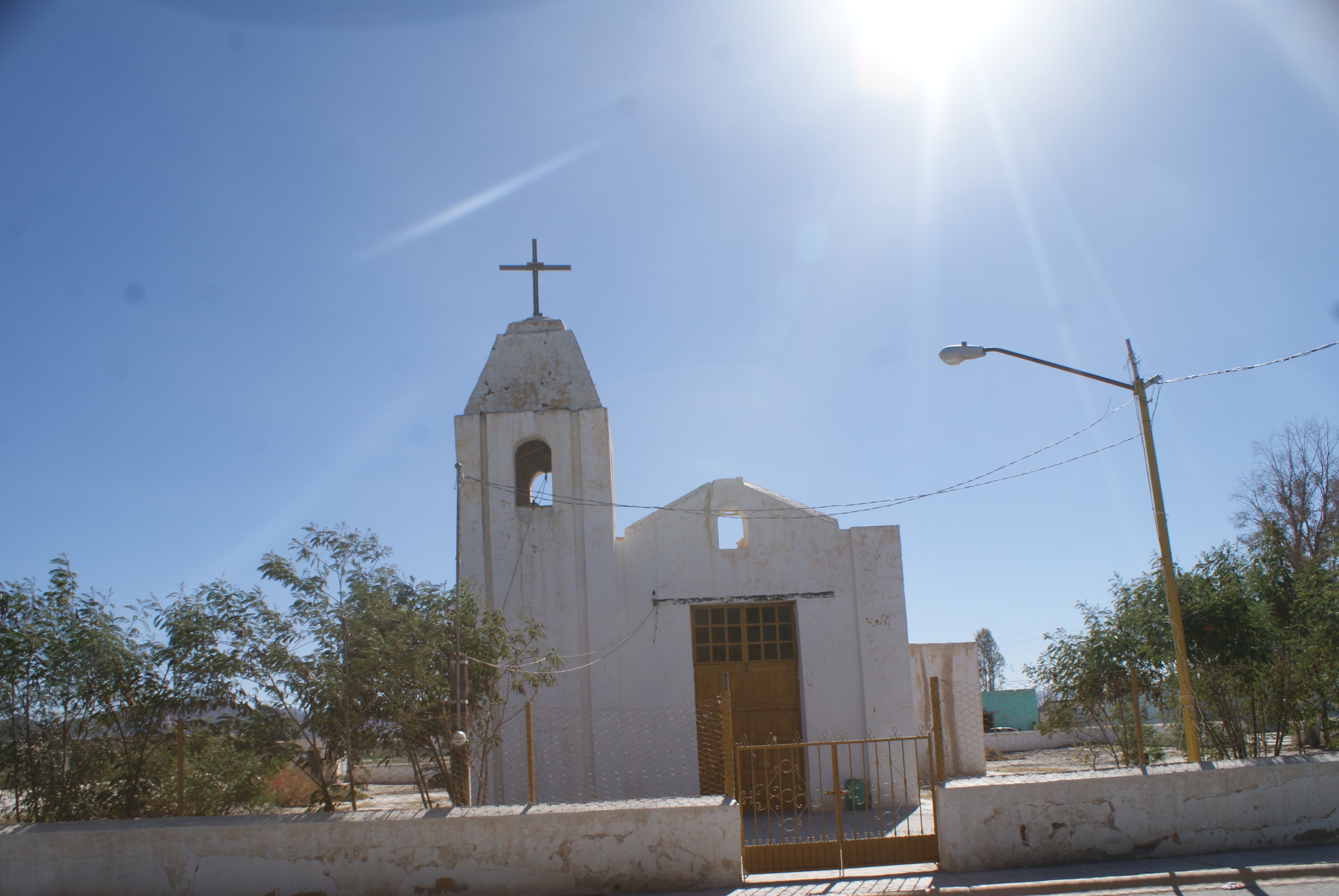
Church in Paredón

== Notable people ==
- Eulalio Gutiérrez, president of Mexico from November 1914 to January 1915
