= Frontera Municipality =

Municipality in the Mexican state of Coahuila

Frontera
- Municipality
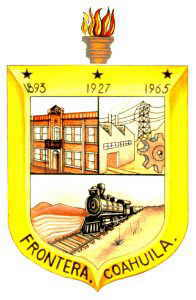
- Coat of arms

- Municipality of Frontera in Coahuila

- Location in Mexico
- Coordinates: 26°55′36″N 101°27′9″W
- Country: Mexico
- State: Coahuila
- Municipal seat: Ciudad Frontera

Area
  - Total: 506.8 km^{2} (195.7 sq mi)

Population (2005)
  - Total: 70,160

Frontera is one of the 38 municipalities of Coahuila, in north-eastern Mexico. The municipal seat lies at Ciudad Frontera. The municipality covers an area of 506.8 km^{2}.

As of 2005, the municipality had a total population of 70,160.
