= Viesca Municipality =

Municipality in the Mexican state of Coahuila

Viesca
- Municipality
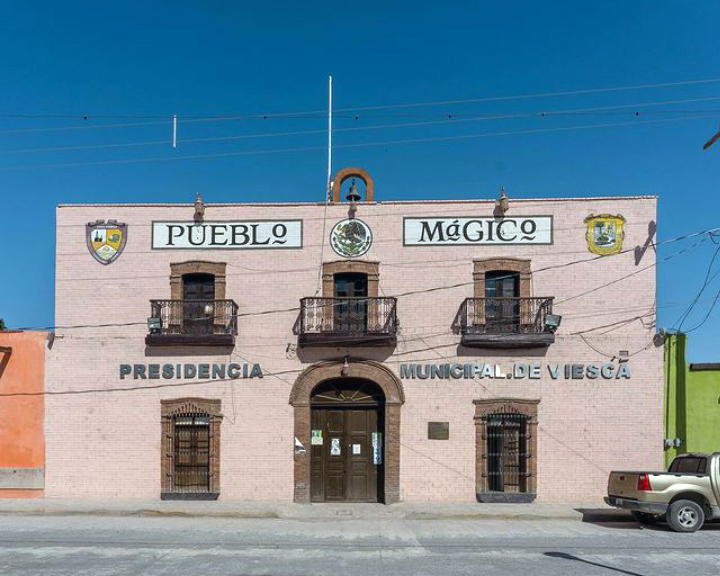
- Town hall

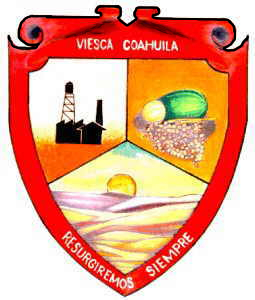
- Coat of arms

- Location in Mexico
- Coordinates: 25°20′28″N 102°48′16″W
- Country: Mexico
- State: Coahuila
- Municipal seat: Viesca

Area
  - Total: 4,203.5 km^{2} (1,623.0 sq mi)

Population (2005)
  - Total: 19,328

Viesca is one of the 38 municipalities of Coahuila, in north-eastern Mexico. The municipal seat lies at Viesca. The municipality covers an area of 4203.5 km^{2}.

As of 2005, the municipality had a total population of 19,328.
