= Sacramento Municipality =

Municipality in the Mexican state of Coahuila

Sacramento
- Municipality
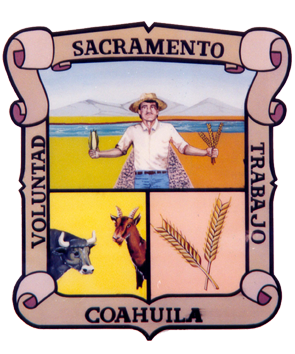
- Coat of arms

- Municipality of Sacramento in Coahuila

- Location in Mexico
- Coordinates: 27°0′13″N 101°43′29″W
- Country: Mexico
- State: Coahuila
- Municipal seat: Sacramento

Area
  - Total: 168.8 km^{2} (65.2 sq mi)

Population (2005)
  - Total: 2,063

Sacramento is one of the 38 municipalities of Coahuila, in north-eastern Mexico. The municipal seat lies at Sacramento. The municipality covers an area of 168.9 km^{2}.

As of 2005, the municipality had a total population of 2,063.
