= Lamadrid Municipality =

Municipality in the Mexican state of Coahuila

Lamadrid
- Municipality
- Municipality of Lamadrid in Coahuila

- Location in Mexico
- Coordinates: 27°2′59″N 101°47′41″W
- Country: Mexico
- State: Coahuila
- Municipal seat: Lamadrid

Area
  - Total: 506.8 km^{2} (195.7 sq mi)

Population (2005)
  - Total: 1,708

Lamadrid is one of the 38 municipalities of Coahuila, in north-eastern Mexico. The municipal seat lies at Lamadrid. The municipality covers an area of 506.8 km^{2}.

As of 2005, the municipality had a total population of 1,708.
