= Sierra Mojada Municipality =

Municipality in the Mexican state of Coahuila

Sierra Mojada
- Municipality
- Municipality of Sierra Mojada in Coahuila

- Location in Mexico
- Coordinates: 27°17′14″N 103°17′14″W
- Country: Mexico
- State: Coahuila
- Municipal seat: Sierra Mojada

Area
  - Total: 6,966.2 km^{2} (2,689.7 sq mi)

Population (2005)
  - Total: 5,245

Sierra Mojada is one of the 38 municipalities of Coahuila, in north-eastern Mexico. The municipal seat lies at Sierra Mojada. The municipality covers an area of 6966.2 km^{2}.

As of 2005, the municipality had a total population of 5,245.
