= Francisco I. Madero Municipality, Coahuila =

Municipality in the Mexican state of Coahuila

Francisco I. Madero
- Municipality
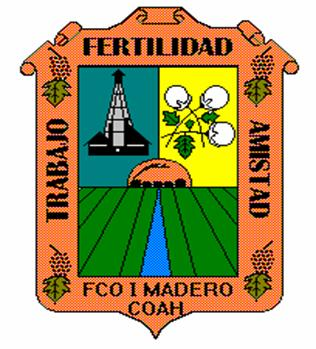
- Coat of arms
- Motto(s): Trabajo, Fertilidad, Amistad (Work, Fertility, Friendship)
- Municipality of Francisco I. Madero in Coahuila

- Location in Mexico
- Coordinates: 25°46′31″N 103°16′23″W
- Country: Mexico
- State: Coahuila
- Municipal seat: Francisco I. Madero

Area
  - Total: 4,933.9 km^{2} (1,905.0 sq mi)

Population (2005)
  - Total: 51,528
- Website: www.fimcoahuila.gob.mx

Francisco I. Madero is one of the 38 municipalities of Coahuila, in north-eastern Mexico. The municipal seat lies at Francisco I. Madero. The municipality covers an area of 4933.9 km^{2}.

As of 2005, the municipality had a total population of 51,528. In addition to the municipal seat, its largest other community is the town of Lequeitio.
