= Nadadores Municipality =

Municipality in the Mexican state of Coahuila

Nadadores
- Municipality
- Municipality of Nadadores in Coahuila

- Location in Mexico
- Coordinates: 27°3′48″N 101°35′37″W
- Country: Mexico
- State: Coahuila
- Municipal seat: Nadadores

Area
  - Total: 834.7 km^{2} (322.3 sq mi)

Population (2005)
  - Total: 5,822
  - Density: 6.975/km^{2} (18.07/sq mi)

Nadadores is one of the 38 municipalities of Coahuila, in north-eastern Mexico. The municipal seat lies at Nadadores. The municipality covers an area of 834.7 km^{2}.

As of 2005, the municipality had a total population of 5,822.
