= San Pedro Municipality, Coahuila =

Municipality in the Mexican state of Coahuila

San Pedro
- Municipality
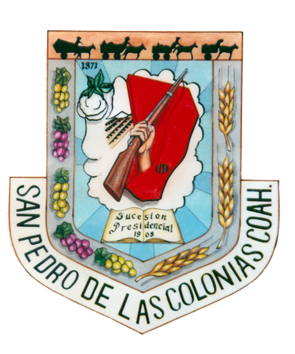
- Coat of arms

- Municipality of San Pedro in Coahuila

- Location in Mexico
- Coordinates: 25°45′32″N 102°58′58″W
- Country: Mexico
- State: Coahuila
- Municipal seat: San Pedro

Area
  - Total: 9,942.4 km^{2} (3,838.8 sq mi)

Population (2005)
  - Total: 93,677

San Pedro is one of the 38 municipalities of Coahuila, in north-eastern Mexico. The municipal seat lies at San Pedro. The municipality covers an area of 9942.4 km^{2}.

As of 2005, the municipality had a total population of 93,677.
