= San Buenaventura Municipality, Coahuila =

Municipality in the Mexican state of Coahuila

San Buenaventura
- Municipality
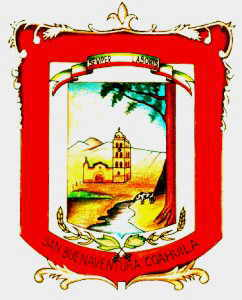
- Coat of arms

- Municipality of San Buenaventura in Coahuila

- Location in Mexico
- Coordinates: 27°03′45″N 101°32′48″W
- Country: Mexico
- State: Coahuila
- Municipal seat: San Buenaventura

Area
  - Total: 3,527.8 km^{2} (1,362.1 sq mi)

Population (2005)
  - Total: 19,620

San Buenaventura is one of the 38 municipalities of Coahuila, in north-eastern Mexico. The municipal seat lies at San Buenaventura. The municipality covers an area of 3527.8 km^{2}.

As of 2005, the municipality had a total population of 19,620.

== Localities ==
- Santa Gertrudis
