= Cuatrociénegas Municipality =

Municipality in the Mexican state of Coahuila

Cuatro Ciénegas
- Municipality
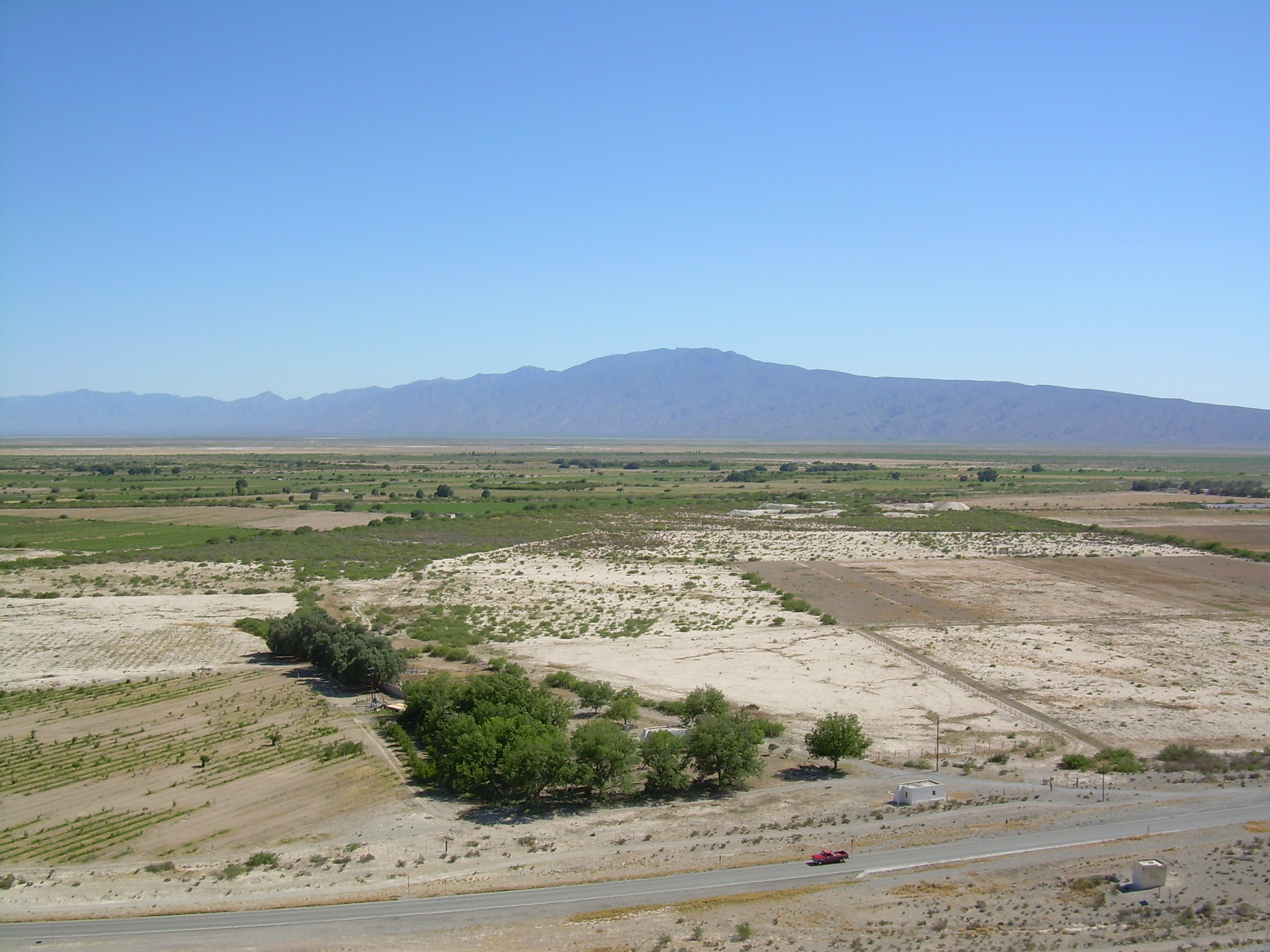
- Cuatrociénegas Valley

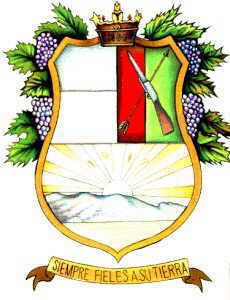
- Coat of arms

- Municipality of Cuatrociénegas in Coahuila
- Coordinates: 26°59′10″N 102°3′59″W
- Country: Mexico
- State: Coahuila
- Municipal seat: Cuatrociénegas de Carranza

Area
  - Total: 7,860.6 km^{2} (3,035.0 sq mi)

Population (2020)
  - Total: 12,715

Cuatro Ciénegas is one of the 38 municipalities of Coahuila, in north-eastern Mexico. The municipal seat lies at Cuatrociénegas de Carranza. The municipality covers an area of 7860.6 km^{2}.

As of 2020, the municipality had a total population of 12,715.

Cuatrociénegas is famous for its endemic species and has been awarded the "Pueblo Mágico" (Magic Town) category by the tourism department.
