= San Pedro, Coahuila =

City in the Mexican state of Coahuila

San Pedro
- Municipal seat

- Location in Mexico
- Coordinates: 25°45′35″N 102°58′54″W
- Country: Mexico
- State: Coahuila
- Municipality: San Pedro

Population (2005)
  - Total: 43,447

San Pedro (formally: San Pedro de las Colonias) is a city located in the southwestern part of the state of Coahuila in Mexico. San Pedro lies east-northeast of the city of Torreón and serves as the seat of the surrounding municipality of the same name.

In the 2005 INEGI Census the city had a population of 43,447 inhabitants, while the municipality had a population of 93,377. The municipality has a large area of 9,942.7 km^{2} (3,838.9 sq mi), which includes many smaller outlying communities, the largest of which is the town of Concordia (La Rosita).

== History ==
During the French intervention, the lands had belonged primarily to Doña Luisa Ibarra de Zuloaga, who was closely associated with Empress Carlota. After the restoration of the republic, the lands, notably the ranches “La Chona” and “El Hormiguero” were seized by the government and placed under the control of Don Jerónimo Treviño, hero of the 1866 Battle of Santa Isabel. Mustered out Republican soldiers settled on the land having been given grants by the governor of Coahuila.

== Climate ==
Climate data for San Pedro (1991–2020, extremes 1963-present)
| Month | Jan | Feb | Mar | Apr | May | Jun | Jul | Aug | Sep | Oct | Nov | Dec | Year |
|---|---|---|---|---|---|---|---|---|---|---|---|---|---|
| Record high °C (°F) | 36.0 (96.8) | 38.5 (101.3) | 41.5 (106.7) | 44.0 (111.2) | 47.5 (117.5) | 48.0 (118.4) | 45.0 (113.0) | 45.0 (113.0) | 43.0 (109.4) | 40.5 (104.9) | 37.5 (99.5) | 35.0 (95.0) | 48.0 (118.4) |
| Mean daily maximum °C (°F) | 22.1 (71.8) | 25.5 (77.9) | 28.5 (83.3) | 32.1 (89.8) | 35.5 (95.9) | 36.0 (96.8) | 35.1 (95.2) | 35.0 (95.0) | 32.2 (90.0) | 30.5 (86.9) | 25.9 (78.6) | 22.6 (72.7) | 30.1 (86.2) |
| Daily mean °C (°F) | 13.4 (56.1) | 16.5 (61.7) | 19.5 (67.1) | 22.9 (73.2) | 26.7 (80.1) | 28.2 (82.8) | 27.8 (82.0) | 27.7 (81.9) | 25.4 (77.7) | 22.5 (72.5) | 17.6 (63.7) | 14.0 (57.2) | 21.9 (71.4) |
| Mean daily minimum °C (°F) | 4.8 (40.6) | 7.4 (45.3) | 10.4 (50.7) | 13.6 (56.5) | 17.8 (64.0) | 20.4 (68.7) | 20.6 (69.1) | 20.4 (68.7) | 18.6 (65.5) | 14.4 (57.9) | 9.2 (48.6) | 5.4 (41.7) | 13.6 (56.5) |
| Record low °C (°F) | −10.0 (14.0) | −9.0 (15.8) | −4.0 (24.8) | −2.0 (28.4) | 6.0 (42.8) | 2.5 (36.5) | 8.0 (46.4) | 8.0 (46.4) | 8.0 (46.4) | 0.5 (32.9) | −4.0 (24.8) | −9.0 (15.8) | −10.0 (14.0) |
| Average precipitation mm (inches) | 9.6 (0.38) | 4.9 (0.19) | 7.0 (0.28) | 2.8 (0.11) | 14.3 (0.56) | 24.0 (0.94) | 28.2 (1.11) | 22.6 (0.89) | 38.5 (1.52) | 14.5 (0.57) | 8.8 (0.35) | 5.3 (0.21) | 180.5 (7.11) |
| Average precipitation days (≥ 0.1 mm) | 2.0 | 1.9 | 1.7 | 1.4 | 2.8 | 4.5 | 5.5 | 5.2 | 5.4 | 2.9 | 2.5 | 2.0 | 37.8 |
Source: Servicio Meteorologico Nacional

== Sister Cities ==
San Pedro is sister cities with Springfield, Illinois, United States.
