= 3rd federal electoral district of Coahuila =

Federal electoral district of Mexico

Coahuila's 3rd
- Electoral district of the Chamber of Deputies of Mexico

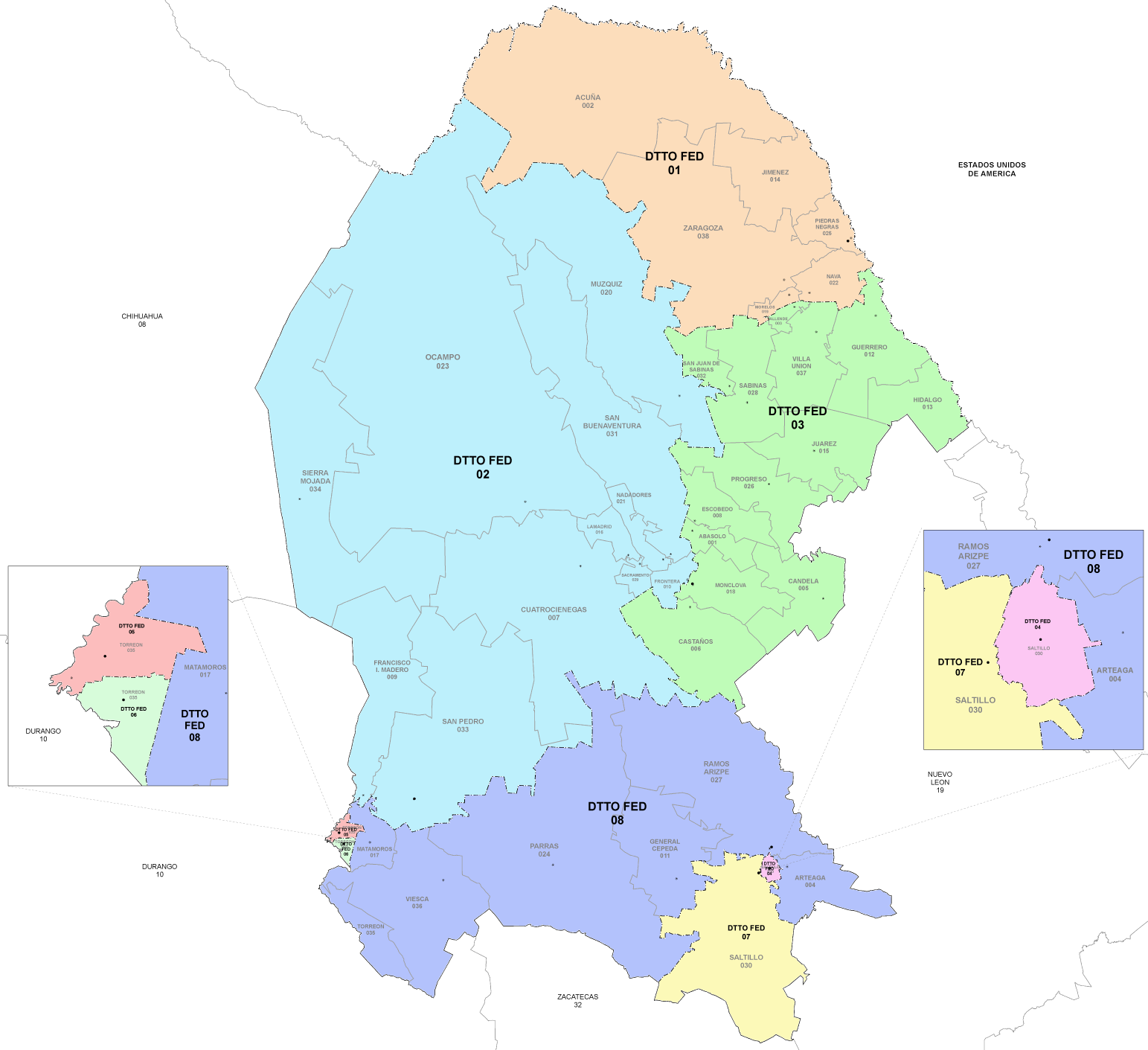
- 3rd district since 2022

Incumbent
- Member: Theodoros Kalionchiz
- Party: ▌National Action Party
- Congress: 66th (2024–2027)

District
- State: Coahuila
- Head town: Monclova
- Coordinates: 26°54′N 101°25′W
- Covers: 13 municipalities: Abasolo, Allende, Candela, Castaños, Escobedo, Guerrero, Hidalgo, Juárez, Monclova, Progreso, Sabinas, San Juan de Sabinas, Villa Unión
- PR region: Second
- Precincts: 268
- Population: 417,078 (2020 census)

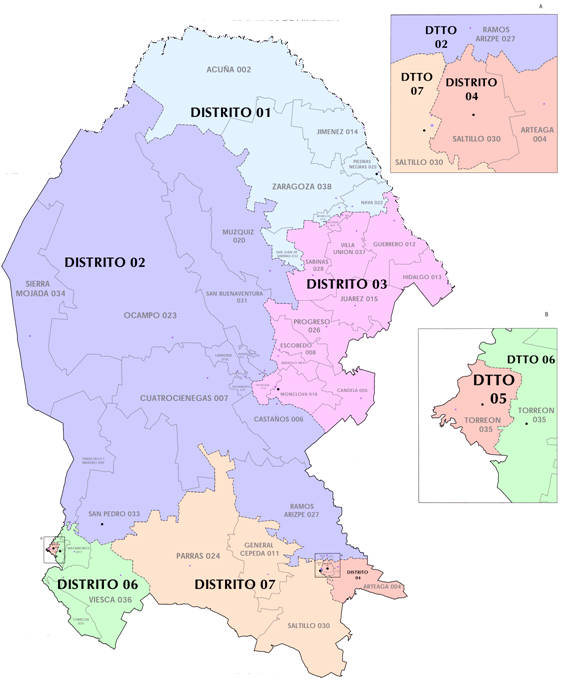
Coahuila under the 2017–2022 districting plan

The 3rd federal electoral district of Coahuila (Spanish: Distrito electoral federal 03 de Coahuila) is one of the 300 electoral districts into which Mexico is divided for elections to the federal Chamber of Deputies and one of eight such districts in the state of Coahuila.

It elects one deputy to the lower house of Congress for each three-year legislative session by means of the first-past-the-post system. Votes cast in the district also count towards the calculation of proportional representation ("plurinominal") deputies elected from the second region.

The current member for the district, elected in the 2024 general election, is Theodoros Kalionchiz de la Fuente of the National Action Party (PAN).

== District territory ==
In its 2023 districting plan, which is to be used for the 2024, 2027 and 2030 federal elections, the National Electoral Institute (INE) assigned Coahuila an additional district. The reconfigured 3rd district comprises 268 electoral precincts (secciones electorales) across 13 municipalities in the central-eastern portion of the state:

- Abasolo, Allende, Candela, Castaños, Escobedo, Guerrero, Hidalgo, Juárez, Monclova, Progreso, Sabinas, San Juan de Sabinas and Villa Unión.

The district's head town (cabecera distrital), where results from individual polling stations are gathered together and tallied, is the city of Monclova. The district reported a population of 417,078 in the 2020 census.

== Previous districting schemes ==
Evolution of electoral district numbers
	1974	1978	1996	2005	2017	2023
Coahuila	4	7	7	7	7	8
Chamber of Deputies	196	300				

2017–2022

Between 2017 and 2022, the district covered 12 municipalities: Abasolo, Allende, Candela, Escobedo, Frontera, Guerrero, Hidalgo, Juárez, Monclova, Progreso, Sabinas and Villa Unión. The head town was at Monclova.

2005–2017

Between 2005 and 2017, the district was located in the central-eastern portion of the state and covered 12 municipalities: Abasolo, Arteaga, Candela, Castaños, Escobedo, General Cepeda, Juárez, Monclova, Progreso, Ramos Arizpe, Sabinas and Sacramento. The head town was the city of Monclova.

1996–2005

Between 1996 and 2005, the district's territory was in the north and north-east region of the state and covered 10 municipalities: Abasolo, Candela, Castaños, Escobedo, Juárez, Monclova, Progreso, Sabinas, San Buenaventura and San Juan de Sabinas. The head town was at Monclova.

1978–1996

The districting scheme in force from 1978 to 1996 was the result of the 1977 electoral reforms, which increased the number of single-member seats in the Chamber of Deputies from 196 to 300. Under that plan, Coahuila's seat allocation rose from 4 to 7. The 3rd district had its head town at Monclova and it comprised the municipalities of Abasolo, Allende, Candela, Escobedo, Guerrero, Hidalgo, Juárez, Monclova, Nadadores, Progreso, San Buenaventura and Villa Unión.

== Deputies returned to Congress ==
(Mexico) National parties
- Current
- PAN
- PRI
- PT
- PVEM
- MC
- Morena
- PAZ
- Somos
- Defunct or local only
- PLM
- PNR
- PRM
- PNM
- PP
- PPS
- PARM
- PFCRN
- CON
- PANAL
- PSD
- PES
- PES
- PRD

Coahuila's 3rd district
Election	Deputy	Party	Term	Legislature
1916	José María Rodríguez		1916–1917	Constituent Congress of Querétaro
1917	Aarón Sáenz	PLC	1917–1918	27th Congress
1918	Alfredo Breceda Mercado (Note: Breceda Mercado took leave of his seat to serve as governor of the Federal District between January and February 1919. He was temporarily replaced by his substitute, Manuel H. Flores.)		1918–1920	28th Congress
1920	Francisco Guerrero V.	Laborist Party (Mexico)	1920–1922	29th Congress
1922	Otilio González	Laborist Party (Mexico)	1922–1924	30th Congress
1924	Candor Guajardo	Laborist Party (Mexico)	1924–1926	31st Congress
1926	Manuel Mijares V.	PLN	1926–1928	32nd Congress
1928	Manuel Mijares V.	PLN	1928–1930	33rd Congress
1930	Alfredo I. Moreno	Institutional Revolutionary Party	1930–1932	34th Congress
1932	Francisco Saracho	Institutional Revolutionary Party	1932–1934	35th Congress
1934	Delfín Cepeda	Institutional Revolutionary Party	1934–1937	36th Congress
1937	Damián L. Rodríguez	Institutional Revolutionary Party	1937–1940	37th Congress
1940	Arturo Carranza	Institutional Revolutionary Party	1940–1943	38th Congress
1943	Raúl López Sánchez	Institutional Revolutionary Party	1943–1946	39th Congress
1946	José de Jesús Urquizo	Institutional Revolutionary Party	1946–1949	40th Congress
1949	Fernando Vargas Meza	Institutional Revolutionary Party	1949–1952	41st Congress
1952	Antonio Marmolejo Barrera	Institutional Revolutionary Party	1952–1955	42nd Congress
1955	Jesús Rodríguez Silva	Institutional Revolutionary Party	1955–1958	43rd Congress
1958	Pablo Orozco Escobar	Institutional Revolutionary Party	1958–1961	44th Congress
1961	Félix de la Rosa Sánchez	Institutional Revolutionary Party	1961–1964	45th Congress
1964	Francisco Padilla Rodríguez	Institutional Revolutionary Party	1964–1967	46th Congress
1967	Juan Manuel Berlanga García	Institutional Revolutionary Party	1967–1970	47th Congress
1970	Aureliano Cruz Juárez	Institutional Revolutionary Party	1970–1973	48th Congress
1973	Arnoldo Villarreal Zertuche	Institutional Revolutionary Party	1973–1976	49th Congress
1976	Fernando Cabrera Rodríguez	Institutional Revolutionary Party	1976–1979	50th Congress
1979	Rafael Ibarra Chacón (Note: Ibarra Chacón took his seat on 22 December 1979 after the election of 1 July in the 3rd district was annulled.)	Institutional Revolutionary Party	1979–1982	51st Congress
1982	Enrique Neavez Muñiz	Institutional Revolutionary Party	1982–1985	52nd Congress
1985	Daniel Castaño de la Fuente	Institutional Revolutionary Party	1985–1988	53rd Congress
1988	Benigno Gil de los Santos	Institutional Revolutionary Party	1988–1991	54th Congress
1991	Fidel Hernández Puente	Institutional Revolutionary Party	1991–1994	55th Congress
1994	Miguel Ángel García García	Institutional Revolutionary Party	1994–1997	56th Congress
1997	Martha Laura Carranza Aguayo	Institutional Revolutionary Party	1997–2000	57th Congress
2000	Óscar Maldonado Domínguez	National Action Party (Mexico)	2000–2003	58th Congress
2003	Ricardo Rodríguez Rocha	Institutional Revolutionary Party	2003–2006	59th Congress
2006	Rolando Rivero Rivero	National Action Party (Mexico)	2006–2009	60th Congress
2009	Melchor Sánchez de la Fuente	Institutional Revolutionary Party	2009–2012	61st Congress
2012	Mario Alberto Dávila Delgado	National Action Party (Mexico)	2012–2015	62nd Congress
2015	María Guadalupe Oyervides Valdez	Institutional Revolutionary Party	2015–2018	63rd Congress
2018	Melba Farías Zambrano	National Regeneration Movement	2018–2021	64th Congress
2021	Cristina Amezcua González	Institutional Revolutionary Party	2021–2024	65th Congress
2024	Theodoros Kalionchiz de la Fuente	National Action Party (Mexico)	2024–2027	66th Congress

== Presidential elections ==
Coahuila's 3rd district
Election	District won by	Party or coalition	%
2018	Andrés Manuel López Obrador	Juntos Haremos Historia	47.5375
2024	Claudia Sheinbaum Pardo	Sigamos Haciendo Historia	51.7470
