= Deseret Power Railway =

Railway line in Utah and Colorado, US

Coordinates: 40.20596°N 108.99033°W

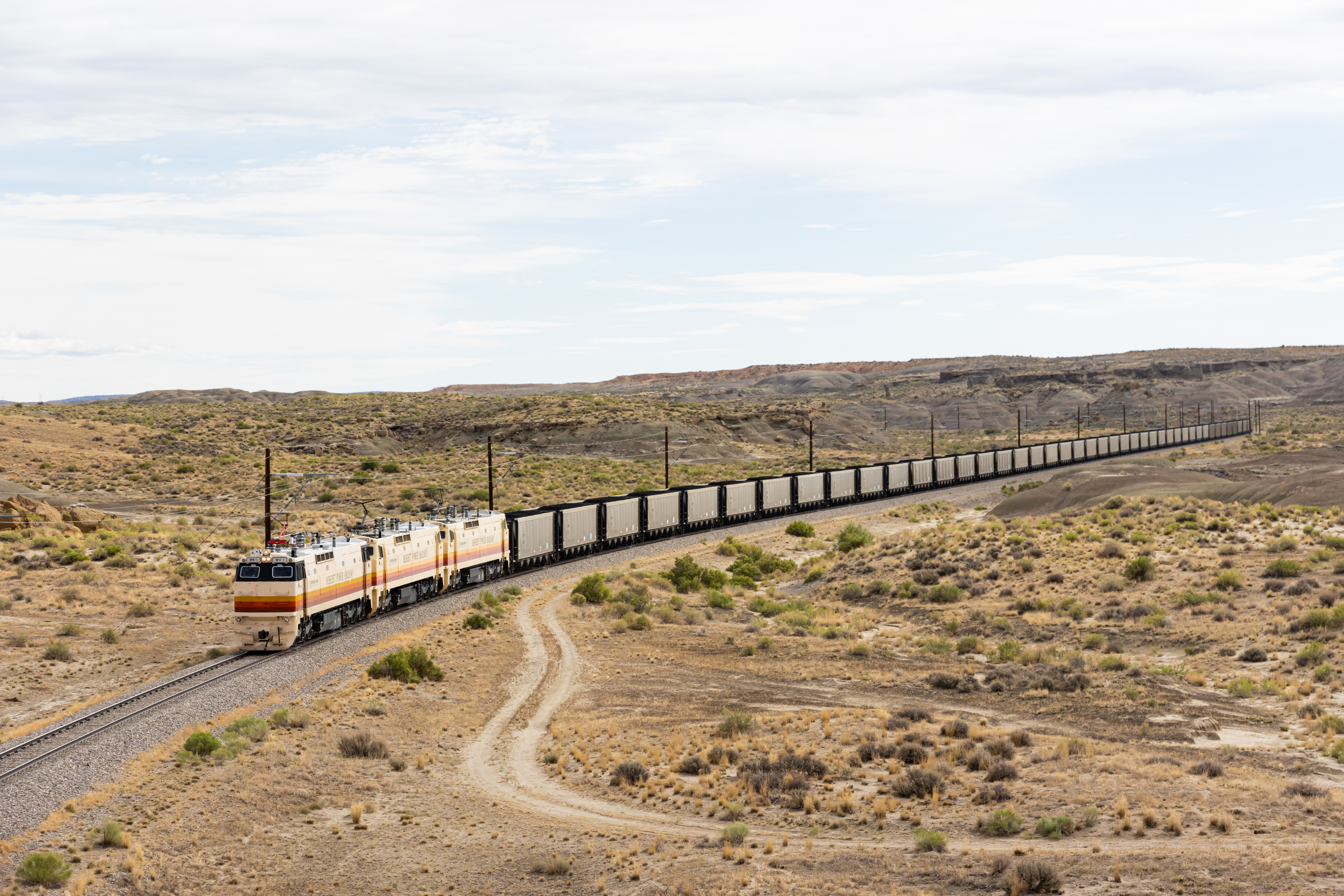

Overview
- Status: Operating
- Owner: Blue Mountain Energy
- Locale: Rio Blanco County, Colorado; Moffat County, Colorado; Uintah County, Utah
- Termini: East terminal: Deserado Mine coal loading facility; West terminal: Bonanza Power Plant

Service
- Type: Freight railroad for coal
- Operator(s): Blue Mountain Energy
- Rolling stock: 7 E60C-2 (4 operative, 3 stored); 59 bottom dump coal hopper cars

History
- Opened: January 4, 1984

Technical
- Line length: 33 miles (53 km)
- Track length: 39.4 miles (63.4 km)
- Character: single track main line with one passing siding and two loops
- Track gauge: 1,435 mm (4 ft 8 1/2 in)
- Electrification: 50 kV 60 Hz (AC) overhead catenary

The Deseret Power Railway (/ˌdɛzəˈrɛt/) (reporting mark DPRW), formerly known as the Deseret-Western Railway, is an electrified private Class III railroad operating in northeastern Utah and northwestern Colorado. It does not connect to the national rail network and has no signaling system. It was built to transport coal from a mine to a nearby power plant.

== History ==
The railroad was built in 1983 by Railroad Builders of Englewood, Colorado. All rolling stock was trucked 90 miles (140 km) via highway from Rifle, Colorado, the nearest point of the national rail network. The railroad began operation in January 1984 as Deseret Western Railway owned by Western Fuels Utah (WFU). This joint company was owned 90% by the Deseret Generation & Transmission Cooperative, which operated the Bonanza Power Plant, and 10% by Western Fuels Association. Its task was to operate the Deserado Mine and transport the produced coal to the power plant.

In October 1996, Deseret Generation & Transmission Cooperative bought the 10% share in WFU from Western Fuels Association and changed the name of WFU to Blue Mountain Energy. On September 1, 2001, Deseret Generation & Transmission Cooperative changed its name to Deseret Power Cooperative and at the same time the railroad changed its name to the current Deseret Power Railway.

== Route description ==
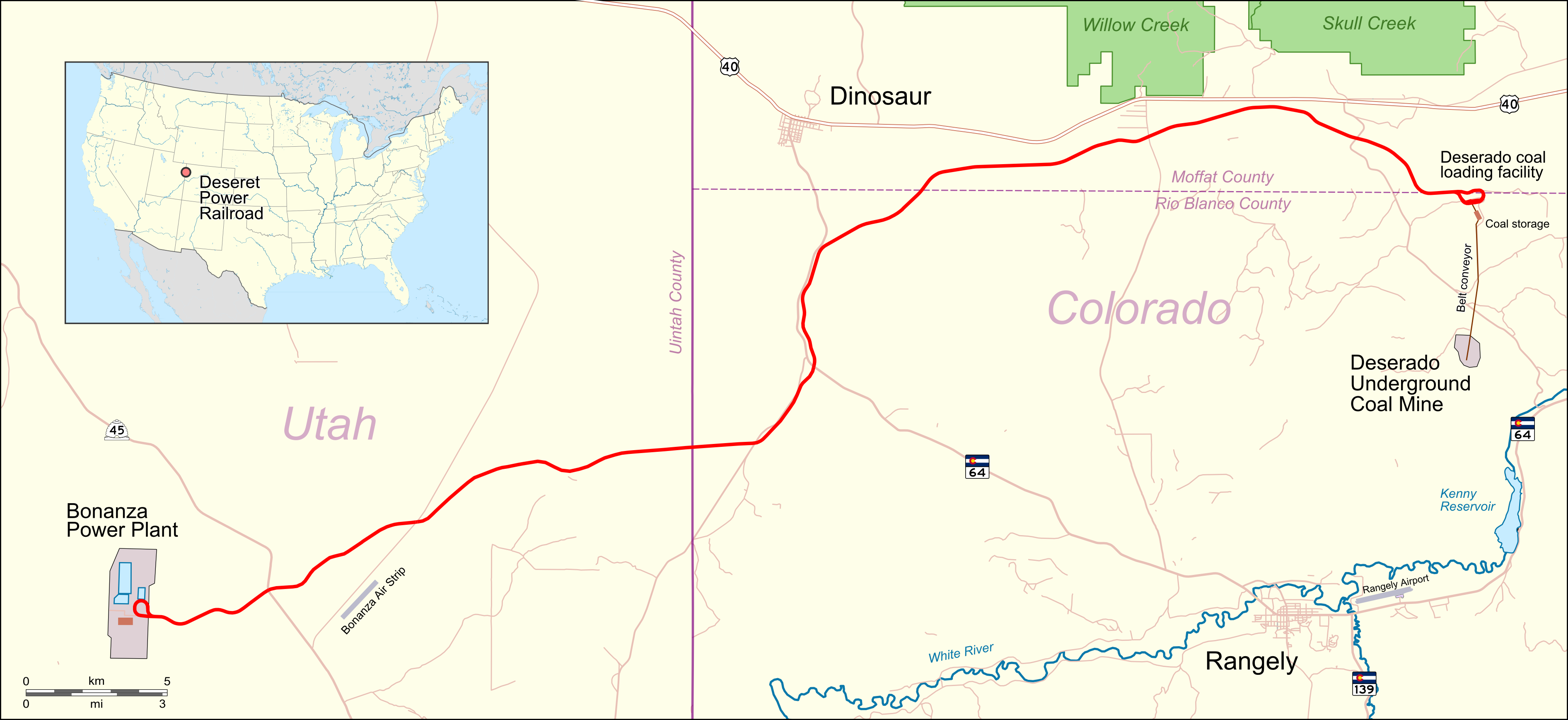
Map of the route

The Deseret Power Railroad exists only to transport coal from the co-operative's Deserado Coal Mine located northeast of Rangely, Colorado and south of Dinosaur, Colorado to their 400 MW Bonanza Power Plant located northwest of Bonanza, Utah. The mined coal is of high-volatile bituminous C quality. The length of the railway is about 35 miles (56 km), with 17 miles (27 km) in Utah. Each end of the line has a balloon loop; engine-servicing facilities are within the mine's loop. A siding is located halfway between the power plant and the mine. There are at least three grade crossings on the line, one of which, at Deserado Mine Road, has active warning devices. All other roads use over- or underpasses. The underpasses are typically built as corrugated steel culverts.

The route climbs from the mine over the Holum Pass, the lowest spot in the Skyline Ridge, before descending and crossing Colorado State Highway 64. Afterwards it climbs another ridge before reaching the power plant.

== Operations and equipment ==
The railroad is electrified using an overhead catenary system energized at 50 kV 60 Hz AC to supply power to its electric locomotives.

Motive power initially consisted of two General Electric E60Cs with road numbers WFU-1 and WFU-2. These two locomotives operated a 35-car train between the mine and the power plant. The trip between power plant and coal mine takes just short of one hour.

In September 2001, the locomotives received new road numbers (DPR-1 and DPR-2) when the railroad changed its name. The locomotive lettering was changed from Deseret Western Railroad to Deseret Railroad by painting over the word Western.

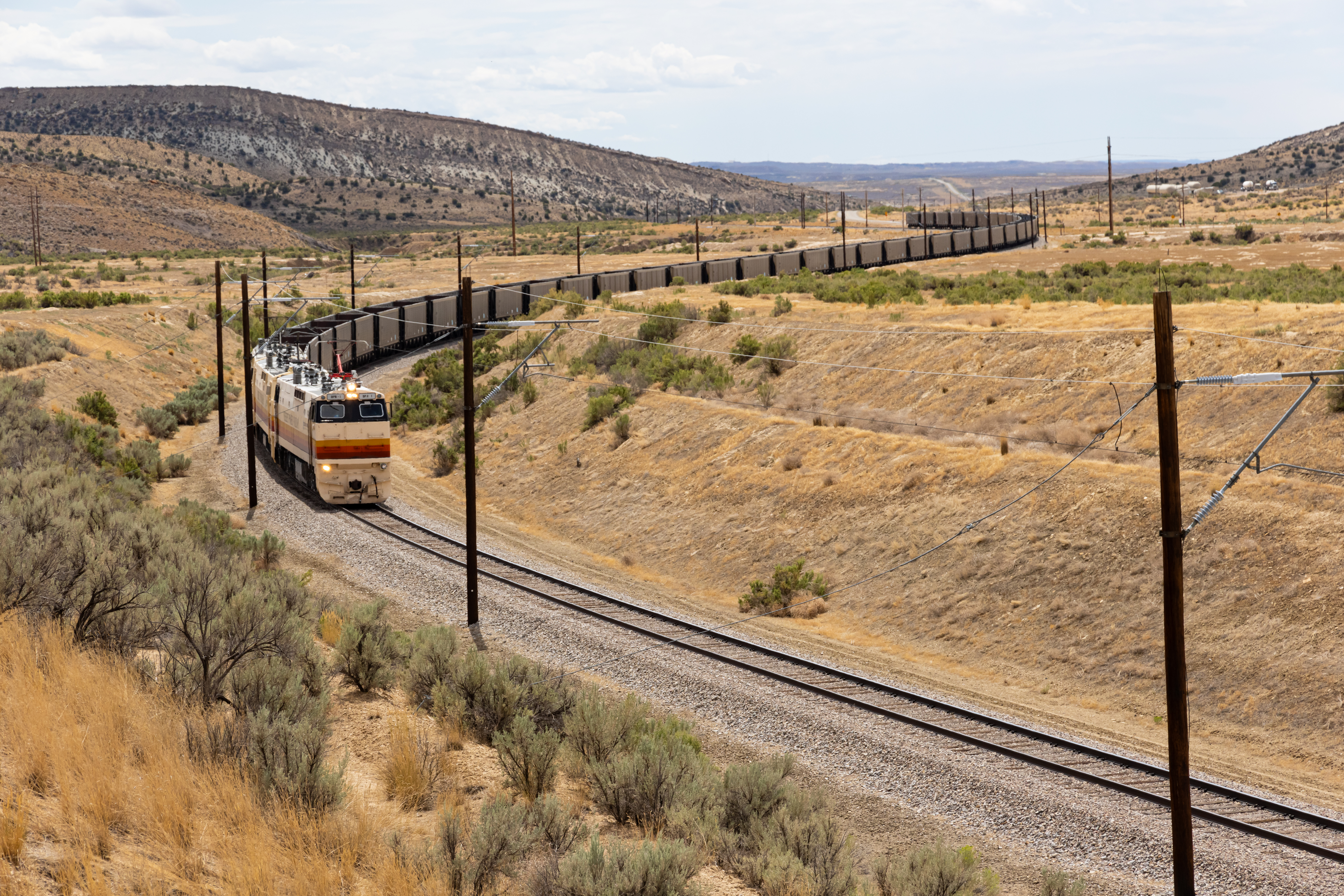
An eastbound return train seen from Highway 64

At the same time, the railroad purchased two more E60C locomotives second-hand from an abandoned Mexican electrification project. The Ferrocarriles Nacionales de México (NdeM) had ordered a series of 39 locomotives for 25 kV catenary voltage to be used on the new electrified line from Mexico City to Irapuato. Only 28 locomotives from this series entered revenue service, and the surplus locomotives were stored in Mercedes, Texas. Soon after, the electric operation ceased and the catenary was removed to create more clearance for container trains. The two locomotives purchased by Deseret had the road numbers EA031 and EA035. They went first from surplus storage to Texas Utilities, which sold them to the DPR. They kept the original paint scheme including the side wall lettering. Only EA031 entered revenue service as DPR-3 after being converted to 50 kV catenary supply using the railroad's spare transformer.

In February 2003, the railroad received 24 new bottom dump hoppers built by Johnstown America. These cars of the Autoflood III type with 5 bays received road numbers DPR-56 to DPR-79. The cars were brought from the manufacturer to Craig, Colorado, where they were picked up by Blue Mountain Energy and trucked to the Deserado Mine Loadout.

In October 2004, the railroad purchased three more NdeM locomotives, with road numbers EA012, EA017 and EA028. From this batch, only one locomotive entered revenue service as DPR-4. The locomotive had originally the road number EA012 and the conversion to 50 kV was done by rewinding the transformer.

As of 2024, a 45-car train with three locomotives run one to two trips during Monday to Thursday, with more trains usually on Tuesday to Thursday, but frequency varies with demand. If needed, a third round trip is done at night. The two original locomotives and one of the converted former NdeM locomotives in Deseret Power livery usually were, until recently, the used configuration. But as of 2024, the current configuration is one of the two original locomotives leading, often interchanged between runs, and two of the converted former NdeM locomotives in Deseret Power livery.

== See also ==
- Navajo Mine Railroad – another electric mine railroad in the US
- Black Mesa and Lake Powell Railroad – a former electric mine railroad in the US
- Iowa Traction Railway – another old electric shortline railroad in the US
