= Arizona State Railroad Museum =

Non-profit foundation

Coordinates: 35.26196°N 112.17927°W

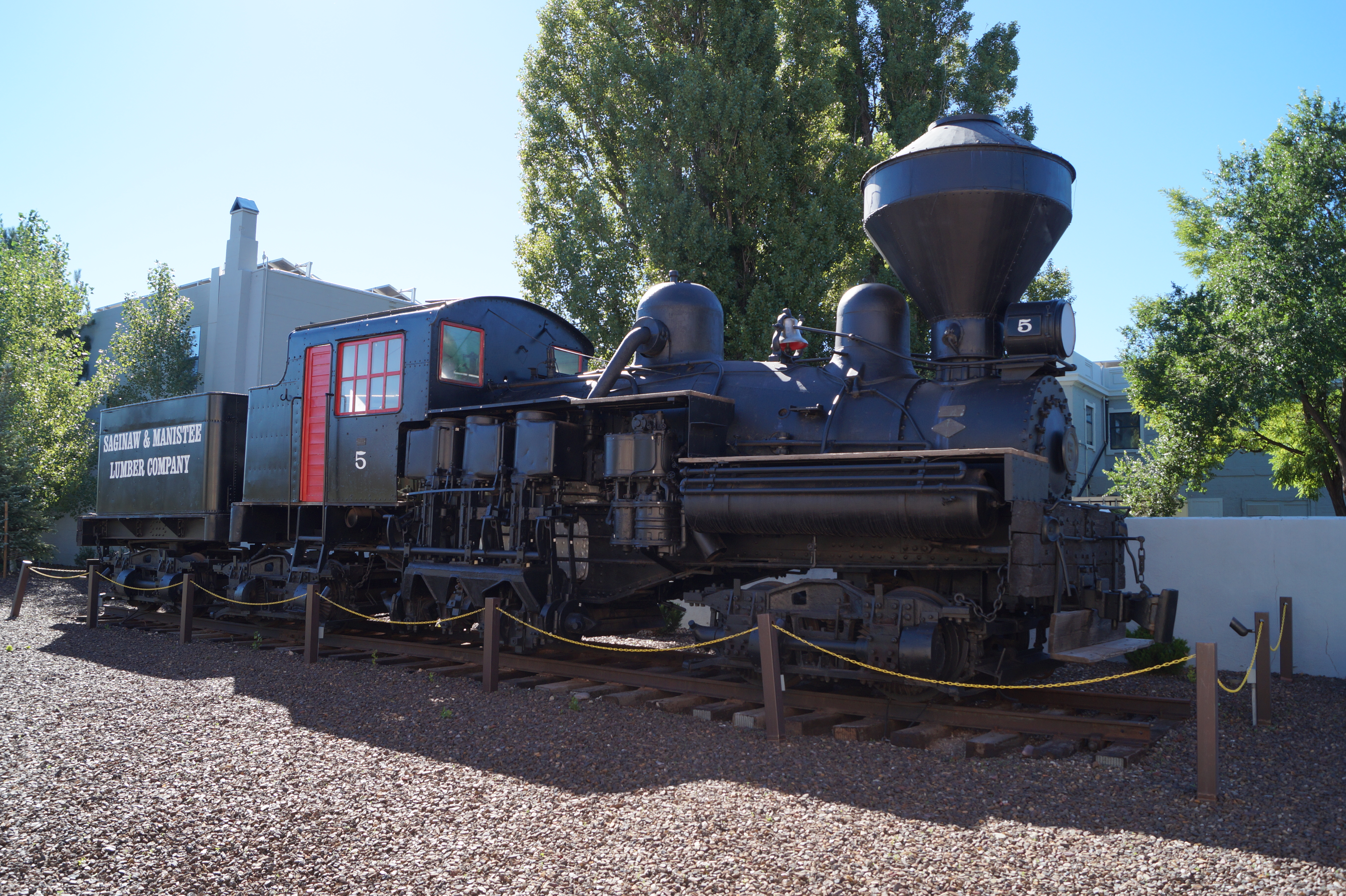
- Arizona State Railroad Museum Shay No 5 steam locomotive on display in Williams, Arizona

Overview
- Headquarters: Williams, Arizona
- Reporting mark: ASRM
- Locale: Coconino County, Arizona
- Dates of operation: 2009–present

Technical
- Track gauge: 4 ft 8 1/2 in (1,435 mm) standard gauge 3 ft (914 mm)

Other
- Website: azstaterrmuseum.org

The Arizona State Railroad Museum Foundation (ASRM) is a non-profit organization that primarily preserves historic railroad equipment that was once used throughout the state of Arizona. It was founded in 2009, and it is located in Williams, Arizona alongside the Grand Canyon Railway. Their goal is to construct a 21-acre museum to attract a world-wide audience with a collection of locomotives, rolling stock, and other historic artifacts.

== About the museum ==
The Arizona State Railroad Museum was founded in 2009 by a group of people with the intention of establishing heritage for the city of Williams' economy. The foundation's chairman and CEO is Albert J Richmond, and their director and secretary is Donald Dent. The foundation's goal is to construct a twenty-one acre museum ground adjacent to the Grand Canyon Railway's trackage near Interstate Highway 40. The museum is planned to display multiple locomotives, passenger cars, freight cars, and other railroad artifacts that represent railroad history in the state of Arizona.

== Equipment ==
Number	Builder	Date	Model	Former railroad	Status	Notes
5	Lima	May 1923	Steam Class C Shay	Anaconda Copper Mining Co.	Static Display	Never operated in Arizona, but was acquired by the ASRM to represent the Shays used by various logging and short line railroads in Northern Arizona, such as the Saginaw and Manistee Lumber Company. It is displayed by the Grand Canyon Hotel since 2014.
6	H.K. Porter, Inc.	1923	Steam narrow gauge 0-4-0 Fireless locomotive	Apache Powder Company	Operational	Powered by compressed air.
1317	EMD	May 1949	Diesel NW2	Southern Pacific, Ideal Cement Co.	Undergoing Cosmetic Restoration	Purchased by the ASRM on March 9, 2018. Currently undergoing cosmetic restoration to its original Southern Pacific paint scheme for a display.
1528	Alco	July 1952	Diesel S4	Atchison, Topeka and Santa Fe	Undergoing Cosmetic Restoration	Once painted in American Freedom Train colors. It was stored in Illinois for several years before the ASRM purchased it in 2017. Currently undergoing cosmetic restoration to its original ATSF paint scheme for a display.
3	Alco	March 1955	Diesel RS3	Magma Arizona Railroad	Static Display	Originally stored in Texas and Oklahoma for several years before purchased by the ASRM. Currently on display, awaiting possible restoration.
6001	GE	December 1972	Electric E60	Black Mesa and Lake Powell Railroad	Static Display	2nd E60 built for the BM&LP. Purchased by the ASRM shortly after being retired in 2010. Currently on static display.
50	GE	March 1973	Diesel SF30C	Atchison, Topeka and Santa Fe Minnesota Commercial Railway	Future Equipment	Originally a U36C, it was rebuilt to an SF30C numbered as 9501, it is only remaining SF30C in the United States. Currently awaiting to be moved from Minnesota Commercial property to museum property.

== See also ==
- Grand Canyon Railway – the ASRM's neighboring railroad.
- Arizona Railway Museum
- Nevada State Railroad Museum
- Colorado Railroad Museum
