= Mario Alberto Dávila Delgado =

Mexican politician (born 1959)

- Born: 26 December 1959 (age 66); Frontera, Coahuila, Mexico
- Occupation: Deputy
- Political party: PAN

Mario Dávila outside Monclova City Hall, 2022

Mario Alberto Dávila Delgado (born 26 December 1959) is a Mexican politician affiliated with the National Action Party (PAN). In 2012–2015 he served as a federal deputy in the 62nd Congress, representing Coahuila's third district.
