= Black Mesa and Lake Powell Railroad =

Former railway line in Arizona

Coordinates: 36°33′15″N 110°31′35″W

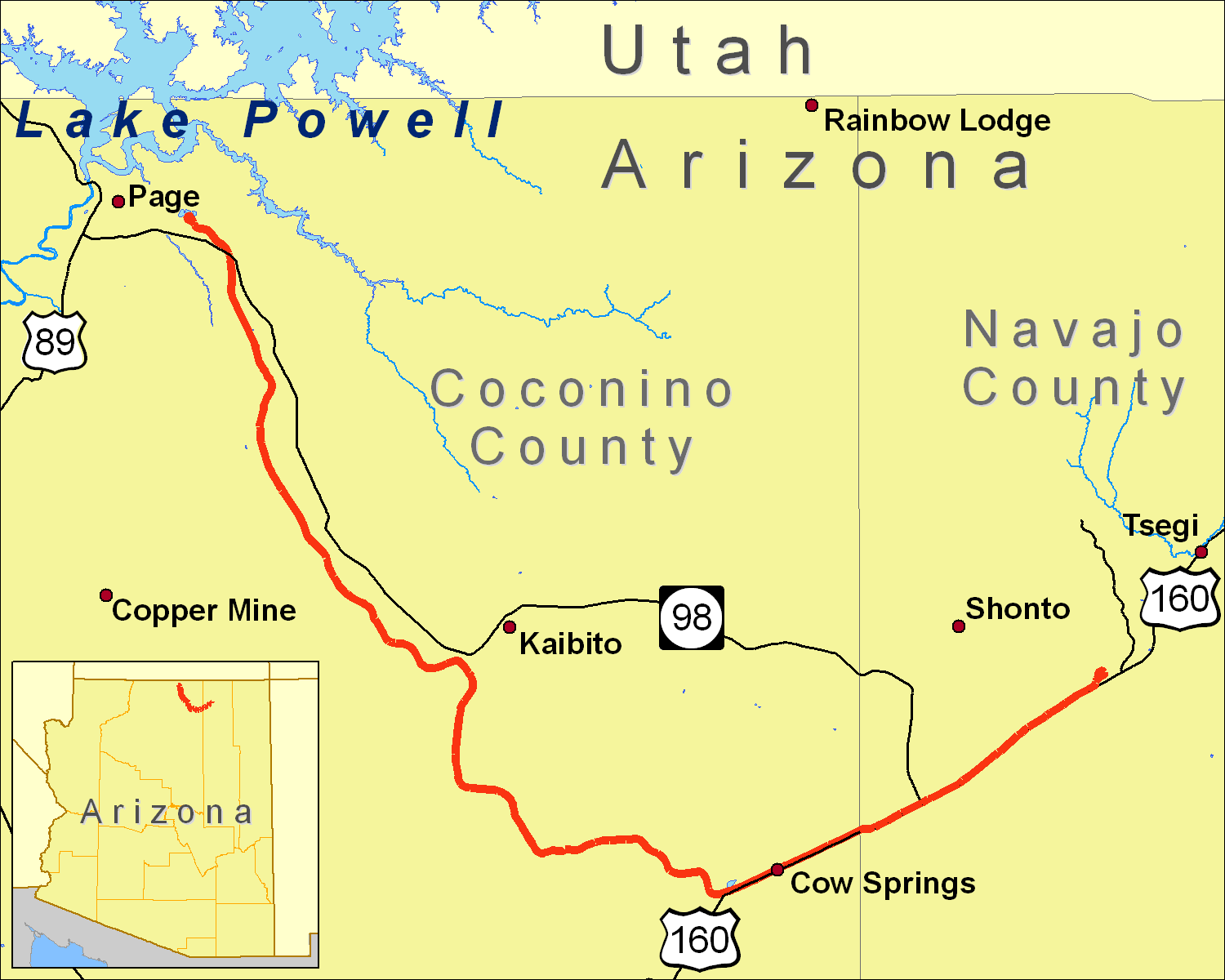

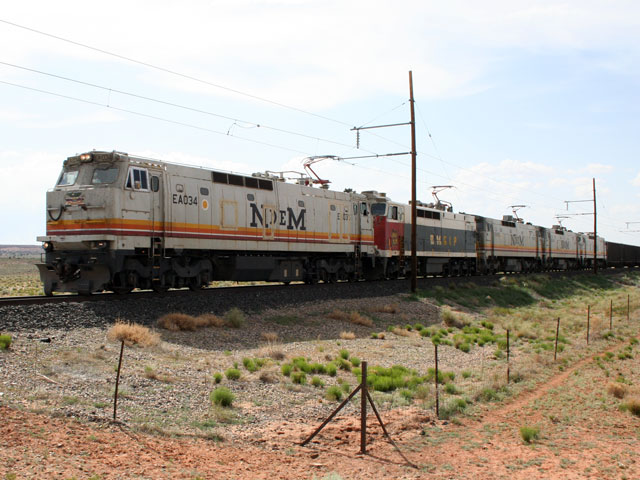
- Eastbound train on the Black Mesa and Lake Powell Railroad, May 19, 2007. Note the Ferrocarriles Nacionales de México (N de M) livery on the locomotives

Overview
- Headquarters: Page, Arizona
- Reporting mark: BLKM
- Locale: Navajo Nation, Northern Arizona
- Dates of operation: 1973–2019

Technical
- Electrification: 50 kV AC, 60 Hz, overhead catenary
- Length: 73 mi (117 km)

The Black Mesa and Lake Powell Railroad (reporting mark BLKM) was an electrified private railroad operating in Northern Arizona, USA within the Navajo Nation which transported coal 78 miles (126 km) from the Peabody Energy Kayenta Mine near Kayenta, Arizona to the Navajo Generating Station power plant at Page, Arizona. It was completely isolated from the national rail network and did not connect to any other railroad. As a result, like metros, light rails, and trams, it was not controlled by the Federal Railroad Administration.

The line was constructed in the early 1970s and was the first railroad in the United States to be electrified at 50,000 volts. It was owned by the Salt River Project and the co-owners of the Navajo Generating Station.

== Operation ==
The line was electrified by means of 50,000 V, 60 Hz, overhead catenary with electricity supplied by the Navajo Tribal Utility Authority.

During normal operations, the railroad operated three round trips per day. Between 1973 and 1976, six E60C locomotives were purchased new. In 1975, the company took delivery of two Morrison–Knudsen TE70-4S units. The only diesels on the railway would be scrapped by the mid-1990s.

In 1999, some 1982/83 built E60C-2s were purchased from Ferrocarriles Nacionales de México and overhauled including conversion from 25 kV.

Forty new aluminum coal hoppers were purchased from FreightCar America to replace some of the aging fleet of 30-year-old FMC and Ortner hoppers. The coal hoppers traveled an average of 400 mi (640 km) on a single day compared to the average American freight car, which traveled 58 mi (93 km) on average a day.

The railroad's final delivery to the Navajo Generating Station was August 26, 2019. The power plant was shut down in December 2019 due to competition from cheaper energy sources.

The electrical components of the railway were dismantled between winter 2019 and fall 2020, but the tracks have remained in place to be evaluated for future use. The tracks have been returned to the Navajo Nation.

== Future ==
After the BMLP was ceded to the Navajo Nation, the railroad and the service road next to it were taken under the care of its Division of Economic Development (DED). Among the various ideas floated for the railroad are turning it back into farmland for grazing, building a rail trail, and repurposing it as a tourist railroad. The Revolution Rail company proposed running railbikes on the line, while Sunbeam Tours and Railroad (STAR) has proposed running solar-powered railcars on the railway. According to Celesta Littleman, the head of STAR, the vehicles are "one permit away" from operating on the line.

In November 2024, the first StarCar, a 12-seat car designed to operate on the BMLP, was unveiled.

As of October 2025, STAR has proposed running trains from Page to Kaibito and from Shonto to Cow Springs, as well as "local service to Navajo residents". Moreover, Littleman is preparing testing her electric rail vehicles (ERVs) on the future STAR line.

== See also ==
- List of Arizona railroads
- Mine railway
- Navajo Mine Railroad - another (formerly electric) railroad on Navajo land
- Deseret Power Railroad - another electric railroad servicing a power plant in Colorado and Utah
