= Melchor Sánchez de la Fuente =

Mexican politician

- Born: 19 March 1956 (age 70); Monclova, Coahuila, Mexico
- Occupation: Politician
- Political party: PRI

Melchor Sánchez de la Fuente (born 19 March 1956) is a Mexican politician from the Institutional Revolutionary Party. From 2009 to 2012 he served as a federal deputy in the 61st Congress, representing Coahuila's third district.
