= Ricardo Rodríguez Rocha =

Mexican politician

- Born: 20 January 1962 (age 64); Monclova, Coahuila, Mexico
- Education: Universidad Regiomontana
- Occupation: Politician
- Political party: PRI

Ricardo Rodríguez Rocha (born 20 January 1962) is a Mexican politician affiliated with the Institutional Revolutionary Party (PRI). In 2003 he was elected to Chamber of Deputies for the 59th session of Congress, representing Coahuila's third district.
