= Rolando Rivero Rivero =

Mexican politician

- Born: 2 September 1944 (age 81); Coahuila, Mexico
- Occupation: Politician
- Political party: PAN

Rolando Rivero Rivero (born 2 September 1944) is a Mexican politician affiliated with the National Action Party (PAN). In 2006–2009 he served as a federal deputy in the 60th Congress, representing Coahuila's third district.
