= GE E60 =

Locomotive class

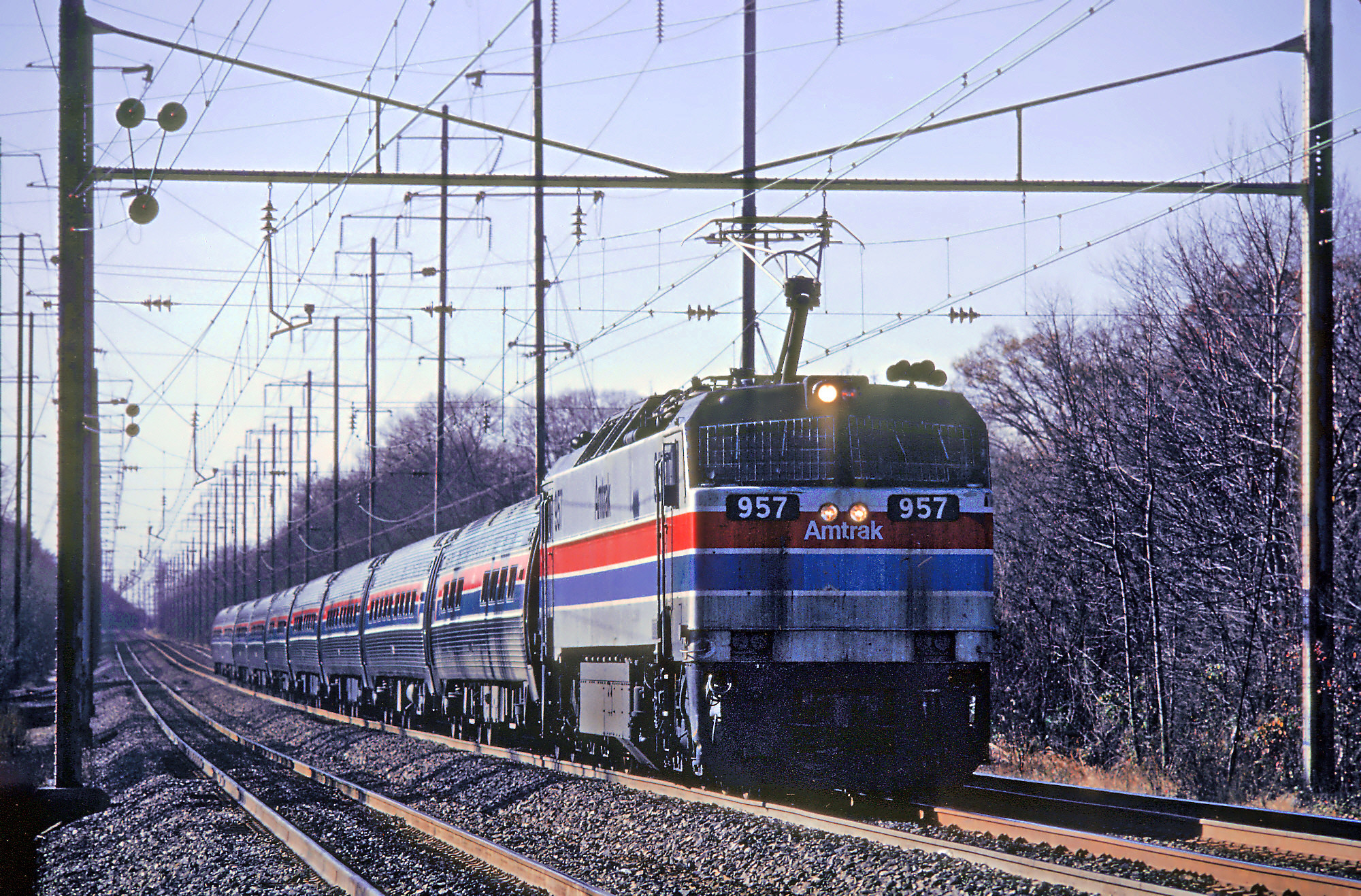
- Amtrak E60CH No. 957 on the Northeast Corridor in 1980
Type and origin
- Power type: Electric
- Builder: General Electric
- Build date: 1972–1983
- Total produced: 73
Specifications
- Configuration
  - AAR: C-C
  - UIC: Co'Co'
- Gauge: 4 ft 8 1/2 in (1,435 mm) standard gauge
- Wheel diameter: 42 in (1,067 mm) (E60C); 40 in (1,016 mm) (E60CP and E60C-2)
- Wheelbase: 13 ft 7 in (4.14 m) (E60CP)
- Length: 63 ft 2 in (19.25 m) (E60C); 70 ft 10 3/4 in (21.61 m) (E60C-2); 71 ft 3 in (21.72 m) (E60CP)
- Width: 10 ft 7 in (3.23 m) (E60CP)
- Height: 14 ft 7 in (4.45 m) (E60CP)
- Loco weight: 387,000–426,000 lb (176,000–193,000 kg)
- Fuel capacity: 500 US gal (1,900 L; 420 imp gal) (E60CP)
- Water cap.: 4,800 US gal (18,000 L; 4,000 imp gal) (E60CP)
- Sandbox cap.: 56 cu ft (1.6 m^{3}) (E60CP)
- Electric system/s: Overhead line: 25 kV 60 Hz AC; 12.5 kV 60 Hz AC; 50 kV 60 Hz AC; 12 kV 25 Hz AC
- Current pickup: Stone Faiveley pantograph
- Traction motors: 6 × GE 780B (E60C); 6 × GE 752AF (E60C-2)
- Transmission: Alternating current fed through multi-voltage transformer to silicon thyristor type rectifiers using phase angle control to provide direct current to six traction motors.
- MU working: AAR
- Train heating: Steam boiler (E60CP); HEP (E60CH and E60MA)
- Train brakes: Air (schedule 26-L), dynamic
- Safety systems: Cab Signal System, ATC
Performance figures
- Maximum speed: 72–120 mph (116–193 km/h)
- Power output: 6,000 hp (4.5 MW)
- Tractive effort: 75,000–125,000 lbf (334–556 kN) (starting); 34,000–82,000 lbf (151–365 kN) (continuous)
Career
- Operators: Amtrak; Black Mesa and Lake Powell Railroad; Deseret Power Railroad; Ferrocarriles Nacionales de México; Navajo Mine Railroad; New Jersey Transit; Texas Utilities
- Locale: Mexico City–Querétaro; Northeast Corridor; Western United States
- Retired: 1997 (NdeM); 1998 (New Jersey Transit); 2003 (Amtrak); 2011 (Texas Utilities); 2019 (BM&LP)
- Disposition: Several in active service, three preserved, rest scrapped

The GE E60 is a family of six-axle 6,000 hp (4.5 MW) C-C electric locomotives made by GE Transportation Systems (GE) between 1972 and 1983. The E60s were produced in several variants for both freight and passenger use in the United States and Mexico. GE designed the locomotive for use on the Black Mesa and Lake Powell Railroad (BM&LP), a dedicated coal-hauling route in Arizona, which began operation in 1973. That same year GE adapted the design for high-speed passenger service on Amtrak's Northeast Corridor. The largest customer was Ferrocarriles Nacionales de México (NdeM), the state-owned railroad in Mexico, which bought 39 for a new electrification project in the early 1980s.

The E60s were successful in the coal-hauling role. They ran on the BM&LP for decades and remain in use on several mining railroads in the Western United States. The passenger variants failed in their intended role. Problems with the truck design caused derailments above 90 miles per hour (140 km/h), rendering the locomotives unusable for high-speed service. By the end of the 1970s Amtrak abandoned the E60 in favor of EMD AEM-7 locomotives manufactured by Electro-Motive Division. In Mexico, the NdeM's project was delayed into the 1990s, then scrapped after three years of use. Most of the NdeM's electric locomotives never ran and were traded back to GE for diesels. Some were sold to various mining railroads.

== Design ==
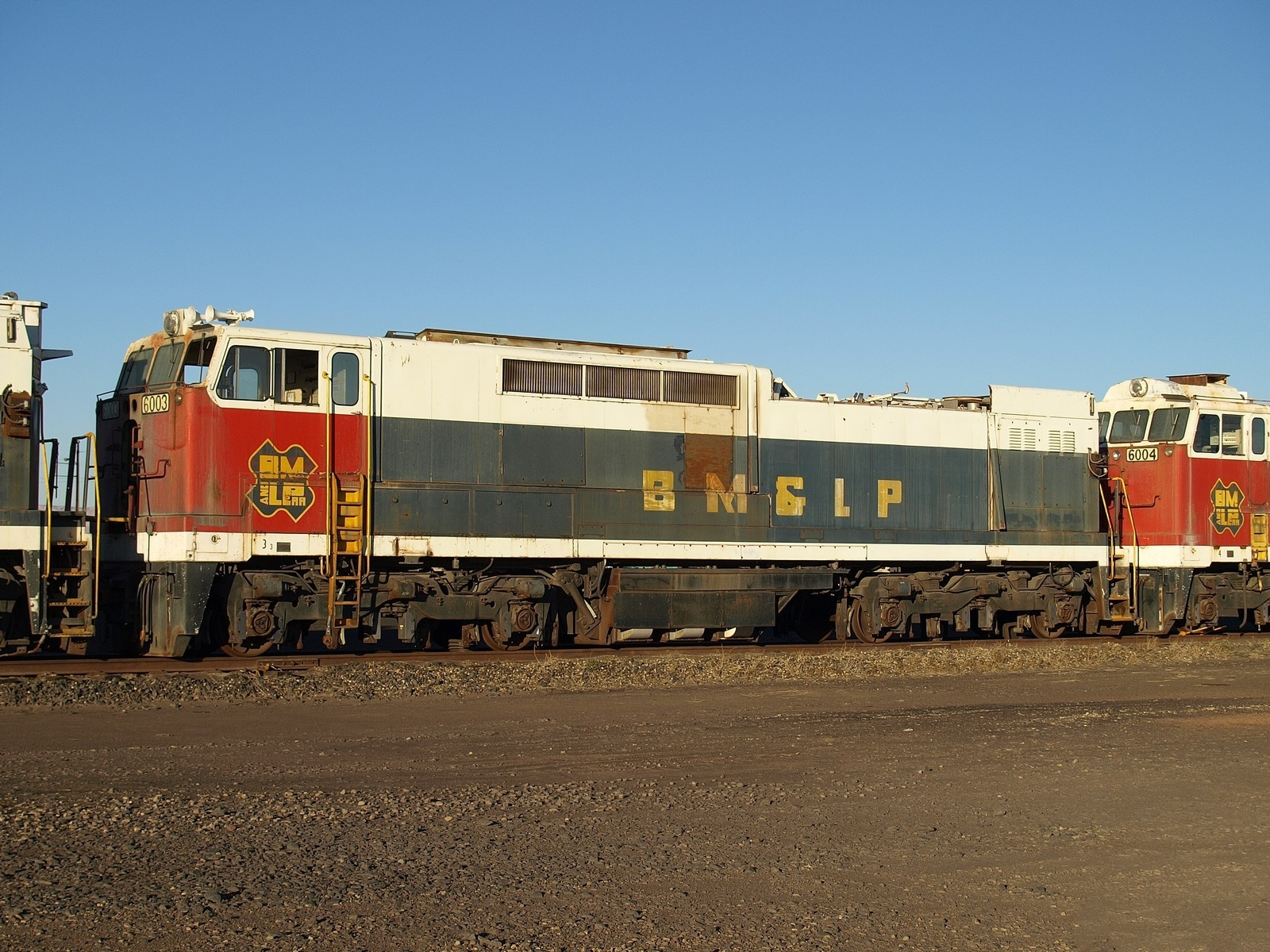
Black Mesa and Lake Powell Railroad E60C No. 6003 in 2010

The Black Mesa and Lake Powell Railroad (BM&LP) was a new railroad built to transport coal from the Black Mesa Mine near Kayenta, Arizona to the Navajo Generating Station power plant at Page, Arizona. It was 78 miles (125.5 km) long and isolated from the national railroad network. The BM&LP was electrified at 50 kV 60 Hz AC, and was the first such electrification to use this voltage in the world. The railroad was intended to run as a conveyor belt, with trains cycling between the coal mine and the plant. To operate this conveyor belt, GE Transportation Systems (GE) designed the E60C, though it was suitable for general mainline freight operation.

The heavy loads of coal on BM&LP drove GE's design choices on the E60C. GE chose a six-axle (C-C) design, with 42 in (1,067 mm) wheels instead of the standard 40 in (1,016 mm) wheels. This was necessary because of the locomotive's 85:21 gearing. With this gearing a maximum speed of 72 mph (116 km/h) was possible, although the standard operating speed on the BM&LP was 35 mph (56 km/h). A transformer steps down the high-voltage AC which is then rectified with thyristor bridges to provide DC power to six GE780 traction motors, one per axle. The locomotive is rated at 6,000 hp (4.5 MW), with a starting tractive effort of 125,000 lbf (556 kN) and a continuous tractive effort of 77,000 lbf (343 kN). Physically the locomotive is 63 ft 2 in (19.3 m) long and weighs 426,000 lb (193,230 kg), including some 100,000 lb (45,359 kg) of ballast.

GE made a number of changes when it redesigned the E60C for passenger use. The new design was lighter, at 387,000 lb (175,540 kg), and longer, at 71 ft 3 in (21.7 m). A gearing of 68:38 permitted a maximum design speed of 120 mph (193 km/h). The starting tractive effort was considerably lower at 75,000 lbf (334 kN), with a continuous rating of 34,000 lbf (151 kN). Unlike freight locomotives, passenger locomotives have to supply heat to passenger cars. In the 1970s Amtrak operated both old-style steam-heated cars and new Amfleet cars with head-end power (HEP). GE designed two variants to handle these use cases: the E60CP had steam generators, while the E60CH had HEP generators. Both models had a cab and pantograph at each end. Reflecting the varied electrification schemes on the Northeast Corridor the Amtrak units could operate at three different voltages: 11 kV 25 Hz AC, 12.5 kV 60 Hz AC, and 25 kV 60 Hz. The wheels had a more standard diameter of 40 in (1,016 mm).

GE revised the design in the early 1980s for use by Ferrocarriles Nacionales de México (NdeM) on its new electrification project. The E60C-2, like the passenger variants, had double cabs and double pantographs. They were geared at 83:20, for a maximum speed of 110 km/h (68 mph). Although geared differently from the E60CP/CH it also used 40 in (1,016 mm) wheels. The locomotives are 70 ft 10 3/4 in (21.6 m) long and weigh 370,000 lb (167,829 kg). They employ six GE 752AF traction motors. The tractive effort was similar to the original E60C: 117,000 lbf (520 kN) starting and 82,000 lbf (365 kN) continuous. NdeM adopted 25 kV 60 Hz electrification. A later buyer, the Deseret-Western Railway, like the Black Mesa and Lake Powell, adopted 50 kV 60 Hz AC.

== History ==
=== Black Mesa and Lake Powell Railroad ===
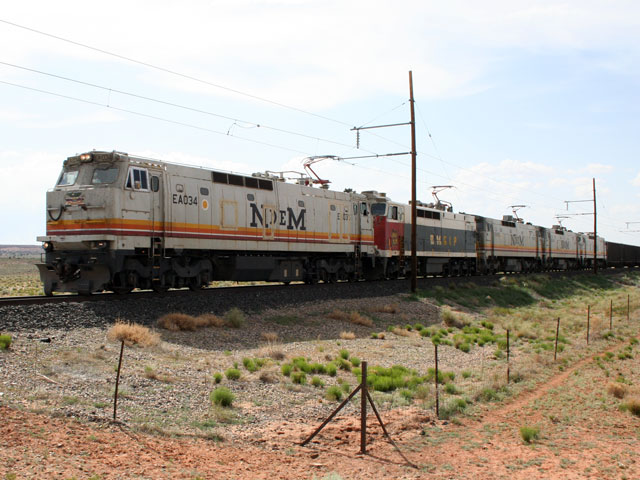
Ex-NdeM E60C-2 No. EA034 leads a train on the Black Mesa and Lake Powell Railroad in 2007

The planned weight of a loaded coal train at the Black Mesa and Lake Powell (BM&LP) was 11,424.5–12,989.5 short tons (10,364.1–11,783.9 t). GE intended that the E60Cs work in multiple, three per train, to handle this load. The BM&LP ordered a total of six locomotives between 1972–1976, allowing it to operate two trains at once. The BM&LP acquired six former Ferrocarriles Nacionales de México E60C-2s after the latter discontinued electric operations in the late 1990s. These displaced the original E60Cs. The Arizona State Railroad Museum of Williams, Arizona took possession of ex-BM&LP E60C No. 6001 in 2010.

=== Amtrak and New Jersey Transit ===
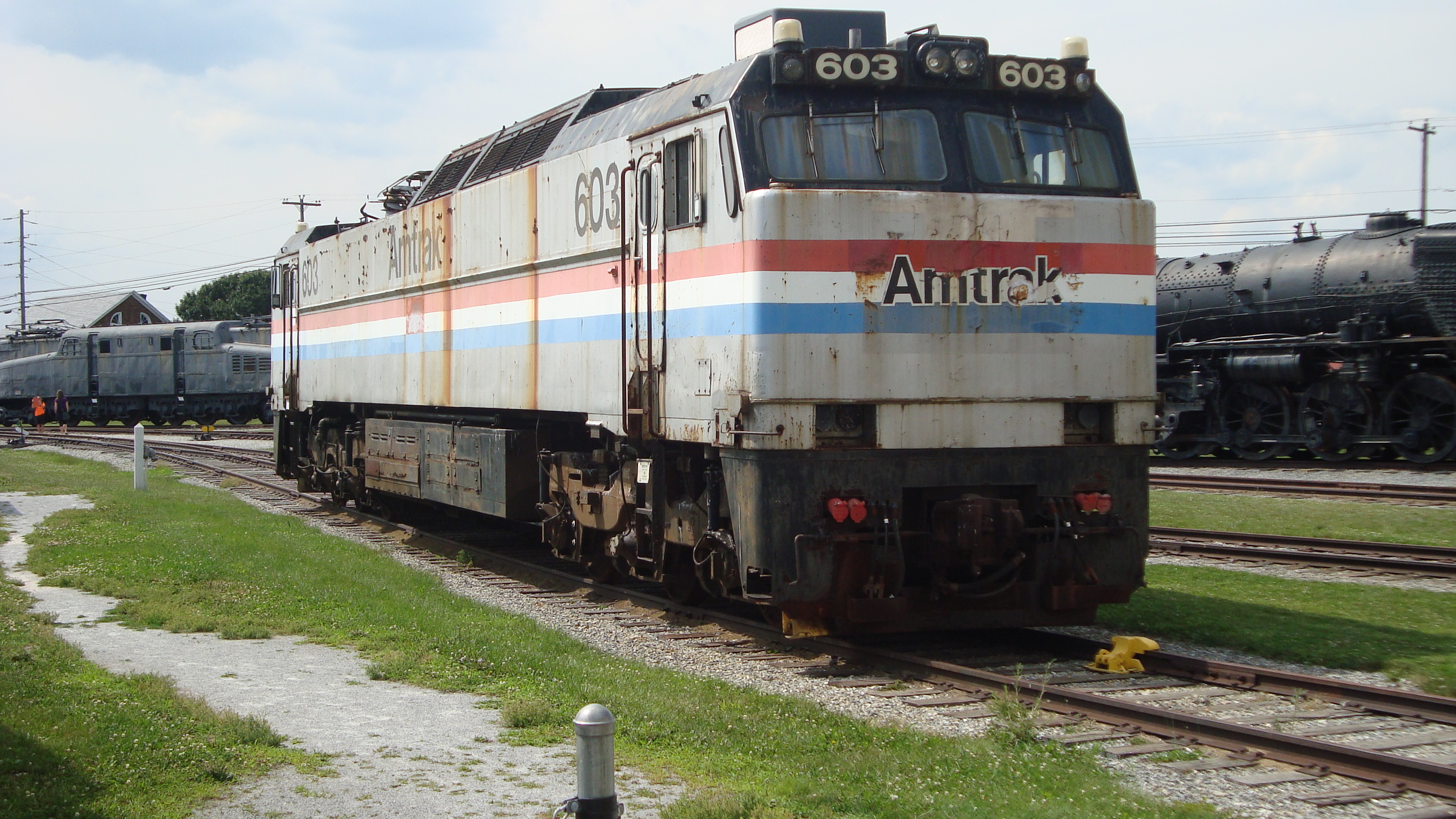
Ex-Amtrak E60MA No. 603 preserved at the Railroad Museum of Pennsylvania

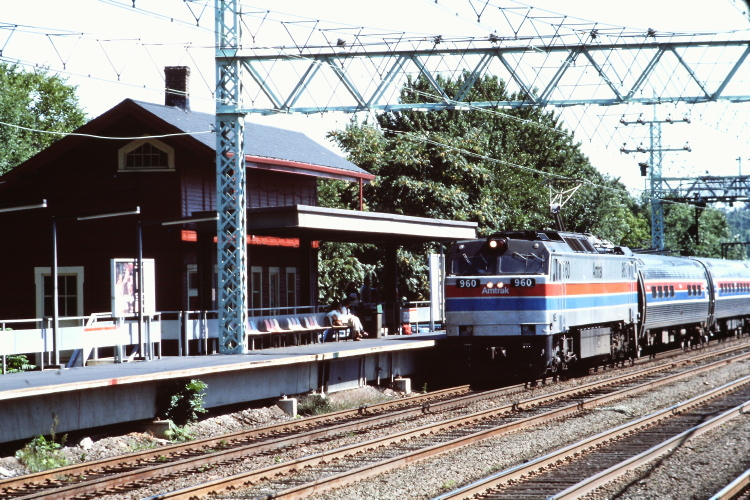
Amtrak E60CH No. 960 pulls a train through Cos Cob, Connecticut in September 1975

Amtrak assumed control of almost all private sector intercity passenger rail service in the United States on May 1, 1971, with a mandate to reverse decades of decline. It retained approximately 184 of the 440 trains which had run the day before. To operate these trains, Amtrak inherited a fleet of 300 locomotives (electric and diesel) and 1190 passenger cars, most of which dated from the 1940s–1950s.

Operation on the electrified portion of the Northeast Corridor was split between the Budd Metroliner electric multiple units and PRR GG1 locomotives. The former suffered from poor reliability, and the latter were over 35 years old and restricted to 85 mph (137 km/h). Amtrak faced a choice with the GG1s: completely rebuild the fleet, or replace them with a new locomotive. While no United States manufacturer had a dedicated electric passenger locomotive in its catalog, GE was proposing a passenger version of the E60C before the BM&LP locomotives even entered service. Importing and adapting a European locomotive would require a three-year lead time; GE promised delivery within a year. With few other options, Amtrak turned to GE to adapt the E60C for passenger service.

Amtrak ordered 26 E60s in 1973; 15 on March 26, 1973, and a further 11 on October 12. The total cost of the order was $18.4 million. The initial order was for 15 locomotives with steam generators and 11 with head-end power, but 9 of the first type were switched to using head-end power as Amtrak ramped up acquisition of Amfleet cars. Amtrak anticipated that E60-hauled Amfleet trains could displace both the GG1s and the mechanically-unreliable Metroliners.

The E60s began arriving in November 1974; they were the first locomotives to carry Amtrak's new Phase II livery. Problems soon developed, as the locomotives yawed sideways when accelerating, stressing the rails. The National Transportation Safety Board investigation after a derailment at Elkton, Maryland on February 24, 1975, revealed problems with the truck and bolster design. The Federal Railroad Administration restricted the maximum speed of the E60s to 85 mph (137 km/h). While Amtrak accepted the locomotives and publicly expressed "confidence" that they would be cleared for 110 mph (177 km/h) operation, it also arranged for a trial of the Swedish-built four-axle Rc4 electric locomotive. The problems with the E60 persisted into 1977, at which point Amtrak developed the specification for a locomotive based on the Rc4 design. In 1977–78 Amtrak ordered the first of 53 EMD AEM-7s, a twin-cab B-B electric locomotive produced by Electro-Motive Division.

As the AEM-7s arrived Amtrak began disposing of its E60s. It sold two E60CHs to the Navajo Mine Railroad in 1982. A grant from the Urban Mass Transportation Administration enabled New Jersey Transit to buy ten of the E60CHs in 1984 for use on the North Jersey Coast Line. Between 1986 and 1988, those E60s that remained with Amtrak were rebuilt, reclassified and renumbered. All E60CPs had their steam generators removed and four of these had HEP fitted. Those with HEP, both the E60CHs and the converted E60CPs, were rebuilt and renumbered as E60MA in the 600 series. The locomotives were regeared for a maximum speed of 90 mph (145 km/h). When the E60s returned to service, they were used on heavy, long-distance trains, such as the New York–New Orleans Crescent, the New York–Florida Silver Service, and the Washington, D.C.–Montreal Montrealer. They could also be found in push–pull service on the Keystone Service trains in the late 1980s and on Clocker trains in the early 1990s.

New Jersey Transit began buying ABB ALP-44s, an improved version of the EMD AEM-7 from Asea Brown Boveri, in 1990. It would acquire 32 altogether by the end of 1996. The E60 was off the New Jersey Transit roster by 1998. No. 958 was preserved by the United Railroad Historical Society of New Jersey. All Amtrak E60s were retired in 2003, having been replaced mostly by the HHP-8. In April 2004, the Railroad Museum of Pennsylvania acquired No. 603 for preservation.

=== Ferrocarriles Nacionales de México ===
The single largest order of E60Cs was by Ferrocarriles Nacionales de México (NdeM), the national railroad of Mexico. NdeM ordered 39 E60C-2 locomotives, built between 1982 and 1983. NdeM intended to use the locomotives on a new 155-mile (249 km) railway line between Mexico City and Querétaro. The line operated from 1994 to 1997; many locomotives never ran in revenue service. After privatization in 1997, Transportación Ferroviaria Mexicana (TFM) dismantled the electrification. The locomotives were made available for sale; eight were still owned by GE and, never delivered, stored in Brownsville, Texas. The availability of several dozen lightly used electric locomotives sparked interest from several commuter operators, including Caltrain in the San Francisco Bay Area and GO Transit in Toronto.

TFM traded 22 of the E60C-2s to GE for GE AC4400CW diesel locomotives. Three were sold to Texas Utilities to serve the company's Martin Lake Line, displacing GE E25Bs. They lasted in service until the end of electrified operations in 2011. EMD SD50 diesel locomotives replaced them. The E25Bs, smaller versions of the E60, had been in use since 1976. Another six went to the Black Mesa and Lake Powell, replacing its aging E60Cs. Five went to the Deseret Power Railroad. Texas Utilities discontinued electric operation in January 2011.

=== Deseret-Western Railway ===
In addition to the 39 locomotives delivered to NdeM, GE built two E60C-2s for the Deseret-Western Railway. The Deseret-Western, like the Black Mesa and Lake Powell Railroad, is a dedicated line hauling coal between a mine and a power station. The line opened in 1984. The Deseret-Western, now called the Deseret Power Railroad, supplemented its fleet with two ex-NdeM locomotives in the late 1990s, and another three in the 2000s.
