= Abasolo, Coahuila =

City in the Mexican state of Coahuila

Abasolo
- City
- Location within Mexico
- Coordinates: 27°11′N 101°25′W
- Country: Mexico
- State: Coahuila
- Municipality: Abasolo
- Founded: November 14, 1827

Government
  - Mayor: Sergio Alvarado del Toro
- Elevation: 430 m (1,410 ft)

Population (2000)
  - Total: 1,130
- Time zone: UTC-6 (Central (US Central))
- Postal code: 25701
- Area code: 866
- Website: www.abasolocoahuila.gob.mx

Abasolo is a city and seat of the municipality of Abasolo in the northern Mexican state of Coahuila. In 2000, the city had 1,130 inhabitants.

== History ==
In 1730 it went by the name of Vicente el Alto, by November 14, 1827, it was granted village status and renamed after Independence caudillo Mariano Abasolo.

== Coat of arms ==
Over a parchment appears the image of an eagle with its wings extended as a frame separated into three sections. In the upper right section the San Vicente Ferrer church is shown. A lit torch symbolizes the free spirit of its inhabitants in the upper left section. Finally in the lower section, prosperity and modernity are depicted in which a tractor driver works the land irrigated by a brook. In the background mountains and trees are seen. The inscription at the top of the parchment reads "Terra Mater", which emphasizes the importance of the land to its inhabitants.

== Geography ==
=== Climate ===
Climate data for Abasolo, Coahuila (1951–2010)
| Month | Jan | Feb | Mar | Apr | May | Jun | Jul | Aug | Sep | Oct | Nov | Dec | Year |
|---|---|---|---|---|---|---|---|---|---|---|---|---|---|
| Record high °C (°F) | 39.0 (102.2) | 41.0 (105.8) | 43.0 (109.4) | 47.0 (116.6) | 48.0 (118.4) | 47.0 (116.6) | 48.0 (118.4) | 47.0 (116.6) | 46.0 (114.8) | 46.0 (114.8) | 39.0 (102.2) | 36.0 (96.8) | 48.0 (118.4) |
| Mean daily maximum °C (°F) | 20.5 (68.9) | 23.4 (74.1) | 28.3 (82.9) | 30.9 (87.6) | 33.7 (92.7) | 35.7 (96.3) | 35.2 (95.4) | 35.1 (95.2) | 33.3 (91.9) | 29.2 (84.6) | 24.6 (76.3) | 20.8 (69.4) | 29.2 (84.6) |
| Daily mean °C (°F) | 12.5 (54.5) | 14.7 (58.5) | 19.0 (66.2) | 22.1 (71.8) | 25.8 (78.4) | 28.1 (82.6) | 28.0 (82.4) | 27.9 (82.2) | 25.8 (78.4) | 21.2 (70.2) | 16.4 (61.5) | 13.1 (55.6) | 21.2 (70.2) |
| Mean daily minimum °C (°F) | 4.5 (40.1) | 6.0 (42.8) | 9.8 (49.6) | 13.2 (55.8) | 18.0 (64.4) | 20.6 (69.1) | 20.8 (69.4) | 20.8 (69.4) | 18.4 (65.1) | 13.2 (55.8) | 8.3 (46.9) | 5.3 (41.5) | 13.2 (55.8) |
| Record low °C (°F) | −6.0 (21.2) | −5.0 (23.0) | 0.0 (32.0) | 2.0 (35.6) | 5.0 (41.0) | 4.0 (39.2) | 0.4 (32.7) | 4.0 (39.2) | 3.0 (37.4) | 2.0 (35.6) | 0.0 (32.0) | −11.0 (12.2) | −11.0 (12.2) |
| Average precipitation mm (inches) | 9.2 (0.36) | 8.9 (0.35) | 8.5 (0.33) | 16.2 (0.64) | 39.1 (1.54) | 27.9 (1.10) | 25.9 (1.02) | 23.4 (0.92) | 33.8 (1.33) | 19.0 (0.75) | 10.6 (0.42) | 7.9 (0.31) | 230.4 (9.07) |
| Average precipitation days (≥ 0.1 mm) | 1.5 | 1.7 | 1.6 | 1.5 | 3.5 | 2.1 | 2.3 | 1.9 | 3.2 | 1.5 | 1.3 | 1.8 | 23.9 |
Source: Servicio Meteorologico Nacional
