= Navajo Mine and Railroad =

Railway line in New Mexico

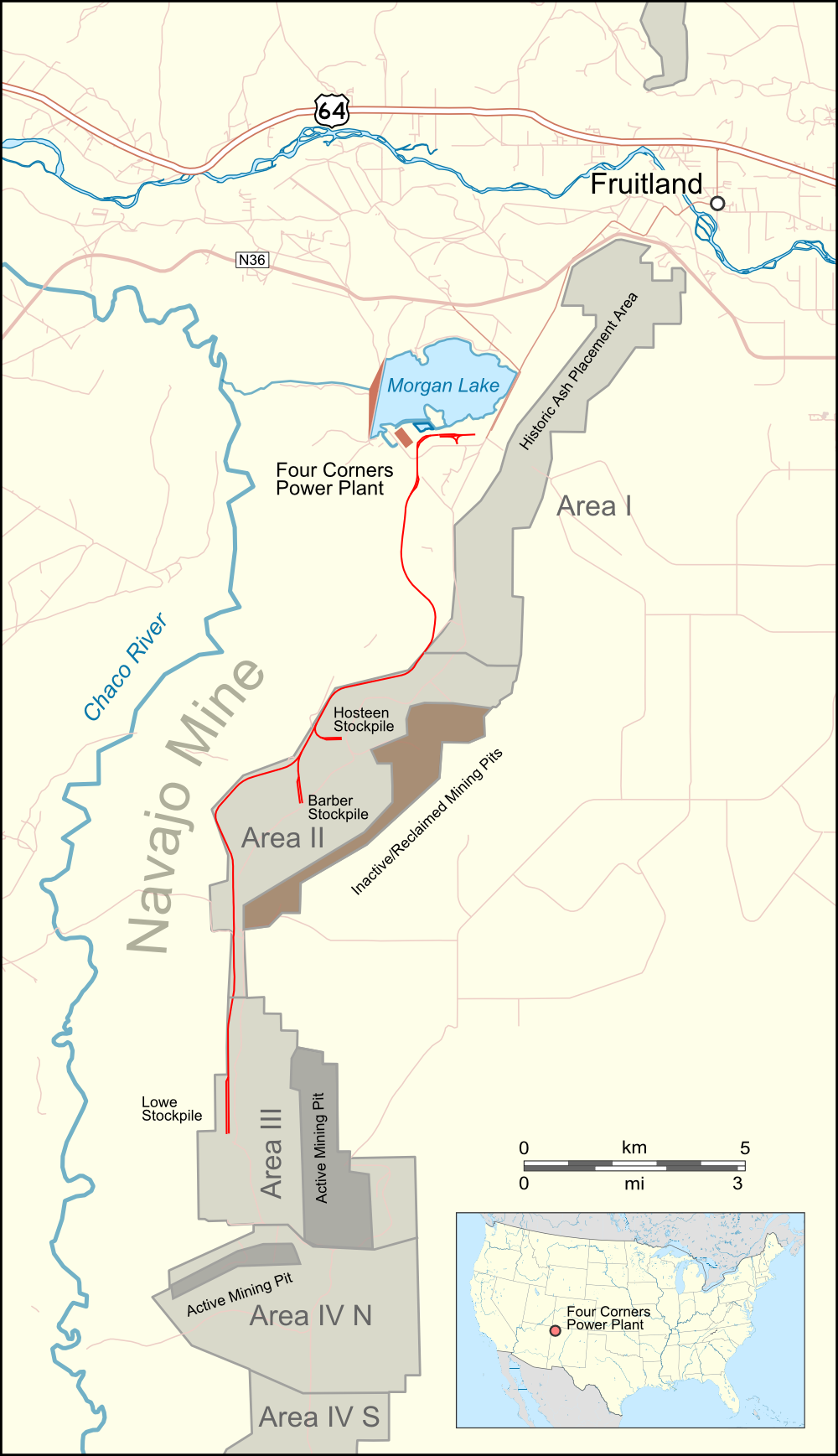
- Navajo Mine and Railroad, mining status as of 2016

Overview
- Status: Operating
- Locale: San Juan County, New Mexico
- Termini: South Terminals: coal load outs in the Navajo Mine; North Terminal: Four Corners Generating Station
- Website: navenergy.com

Service
- Type: Freight railroad for sub-bituminous coal

History
- Opened: 1974

Technical
- Line length: 13.3 miles (21.4 km)
- Track length: 17.8 miles (28.6 km)
- Number of tracks: 1
- Character: single track main line two branches
- Track gauge: 1,435 mm (4 ft 8 1/2 in)
- Electrification: No, formerly 25 kV 60 Hz (AC) overhead catenary

The Navajo Mine is a surface coal mine owned and operated by Navajo Transitional Energy Company (NTEC) in New Mexico, United States, within the Navajo Nation. The mine is about 20.5 miles (33 km) southwest of Farmington, New Mexico. The Navajo Mine Railroad has 13.8 miles (22.2 km) of track between the Four Corners Generating Station and Navajo Mine.

== History ==
Navajo Mine's coal lease was granted in 1957. In 1963, Navajo Mine began operations for Utah International. The Navajo Mine is the sole supplier of coal to the adjacent Four Corners Power Plant (FCPP). In 1977 General Electric acquired Navajo Mine from Utah International. Seven years later in 1984, BHP acquired Navajo Mine.

In 2013, the 22nd Navajo Nation Council created Navajo Transitional Energy Company (NTEC), under legislation No. 0116-13 with a vote of 7-4. By the end of that year, NTEC acquired Navajo Mine. NTEC received a lease extension through the Department of the Interior and the Office of Surface Mining Reclamation & Enforcement (OSMRE) for 25-year site lease extension for Navajo Mine and Four Corners Power Plant.

In 2016, NTEC contracted North American Coal Corporation as the operator for Navajo Mine, forming Bisti Fuels Company, LLC. Two years later in 2018, NTEC acquired 7% ownership of Four Corners Power Plant, the 1,550 MW power plant, making NTEC the only tribal company in the United States to have partial ownership of a coal-fired power plant.

Expanding further, NTEC acquired Cloud Peak Energy assets that included three coal mines in Wyoming and Montana. Those mines are Antelope, Cordero Rojo Mine, and Spring Creek. This made NTEC the third-largest coal producer in the United States. Finally, on October 01, 2021, NTEC assumed full operations at Navajo Mine, thus becoming the first tribally owned coal mining company to operate a coal mine on tribal land. Navajo Mine employs approximately 370 people, with 86% being enrolled Navajo members.

A 7-mile (11 km)-long standard gauge line was built in 1974 from the power plant to the Hosteen stockpile. The line was expanded to the present 14 miles (23 km) in 1983. Because there was no connection to the national railroad network, three diesel locomotives and 22 Maxon bottom dump coal hopper cars were transported from Gallup on low-bed trucks. At the beginning, only one train operated. There were problems with clogged oil bath filters on the diesel locomotives due to excessive coal dust, but the issues were solved with a new filter type.

Electric operation started 1984, as being more economical. (Diesel operation had become too expensive with increasing train loads and fuel prices.) Another 20 hopper cars were purchased, enabling operation of two trains, each having 18 cars. However in 2017, the railroad took delivery of GE ET44AC diesel locomotives to replace electric operations, citing maintenance difficulties.

When Kayenta Mine operations ceased and its railroad was decommissioned, the coal hopper cars were brought to Navajo Mine.

More recently, NTEC has been investing in solar power to expand to other energy alternatives. In addition, they expanded into the Helium realm, acquiring Tacitus. This acquisition consisted of helium wells and infrastructure in the Tocito Dome Field on the Navajo Nation as well as Federal and State leases for additional exploration in Utah. The Tocito Dome Field is proven and producing with existing offtake contracts in place.

== Route ==
The line runs from the Navajo Mine north-northwest to the Four Corners Generating Station, which is located 25 miles (40 km) west of Farmington, New Mexico. It has no physical connection to any other railroad.

== Operation ==
In the past when the railroad was electrified, trains were operated with an electric GE E60 locomotive on the north end and a diesel-electric ALCO Century 425 locomotive on the south end. The Century 425 was normally operated only as a control cab to for the radio remote-controlled E60, when the empty train was returning to the mine. The prime mover in the diesel-electric was still present to provide emergency power in event of an electric outage. There was sufficient equipment to create three trains, but only two trains were normally operated, each consisting of 21 coal hoppers. Each train typically made 12 round trips during each 24-hour operating day. Only one crew member worked at a time: this person took an empty train to the coal load out, then changed to the loaded train to take it back to the power plant. While this train was underway, the other train was loaded.

The railroad catenary had a voltage of 25 kV 60 Hz AC. The pantographs of the E60s were mounted atop pedestals on the roof to adapt to the unusually high catenary. Extra filters for cleaning the machine room air were mounted on the roof of the locomotive.

At the coal loadouts, front-end loaders deposited the coal into the hopper cars. Each car had a capacity between 100 and 125 short tons (91 and 113 t).

In 2020, Arizona Public Service (APS) announced plans to close the Four Corners Generating Station. This closure would render both the mine and the railroad obsolete.

In addition to the mine served by the railroad, the Navajo Transitional Energy Company (NTEC) owns three other mines in Montana and Wyoming.

== Motive power ==
- ALCO Century 425 with the road numbers LOD7, LOD8 and LOD9. All locomotives are former Norfolk & Western engines, which had the road numbers #1000, #1002 and #1005. The locomotives were originally ordered by the Wabash Railroad, before that company's merger with the N&W. They were rebuilt by Morrison Knudsen for operation on the Navajo Mine Railroad.
- Two General Electric ET44AC locomotives were delivered new in 2017 with road numbers 2026 and 2027.

=== Historical ===
- General Electric E60 with the road numbers LOE20, LOE21 and LOE23. These locomotives were built for Amtrak with the road numbers #961, #963 and #968 and were sold directly to the Navajo Mine Railroad, except #961, which was first sold to New Jersey Transit. All these locomotives were scrapped in 2003 and replaced by four E60s first delivered to Ferrocarriles Nacionales de México. These locomotives had previously served the Mexico City—Irapuato line, which was converted to an all-diesel operation.

== See also ==
- Mine railway
- Black Mesa and Lake Powell Railroad – other electric freight railroad on Navajo land, no longer in operation
- Deseret Power Railroad – other electric freight railroad
