= Castaños =

City in the Mexican state of Coahuila

- City
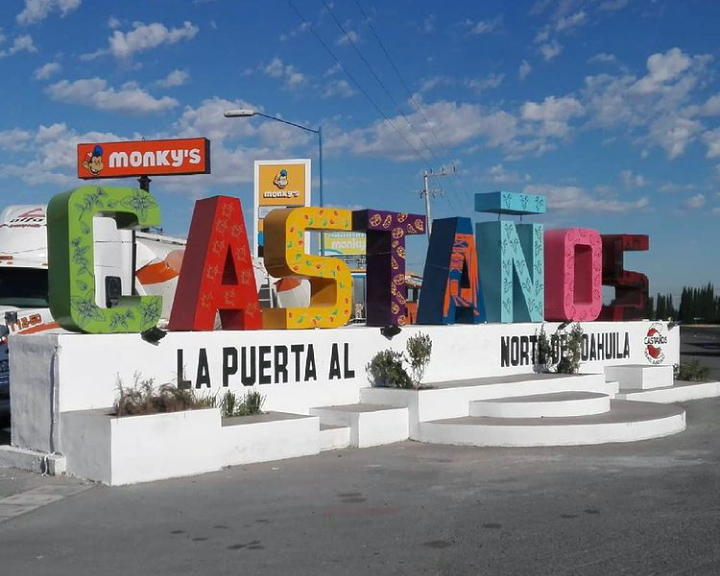
- Castaños in 2019

- Location in Mexico
- Coordinates: 26°47′3″N 101°25′58″W
- Country: Mexico
- State: Coahuila
- Municipality: Castaños

Population (2020)
  - Total: 29,128
- Time zone: UTC-6

Castaños is a city in the northern Mexican state of Coahuila. It is located at 101° 25' 58" West, 26° 47' 3" North, in the state's central region (Región Centro), within Castaños Municipality. It was settled in 1582 by Luis de Carvajal y de la Cueva and Gaspar Castaño de Sosa. The town was then founded on November 22, 1674.
