= FreightCar America =

Rolling stock manufacturer

FreightCar America, Inc.
- Type: Public
- Traded as: Nasdaq: RAIL; Russell 2000 Component
- Industry: Rail transport
- Founded: 1901; 125 years ago
- Headquarters: Chicago, Mexico, United States
- Key people: Nicholas Randall (CEO); James Meyer (executive chairman)
- Products: Freight cars
- Revenue: $496.97 million (2024)
- Number of employees: 2,023
- Website: freightcaramerica.com

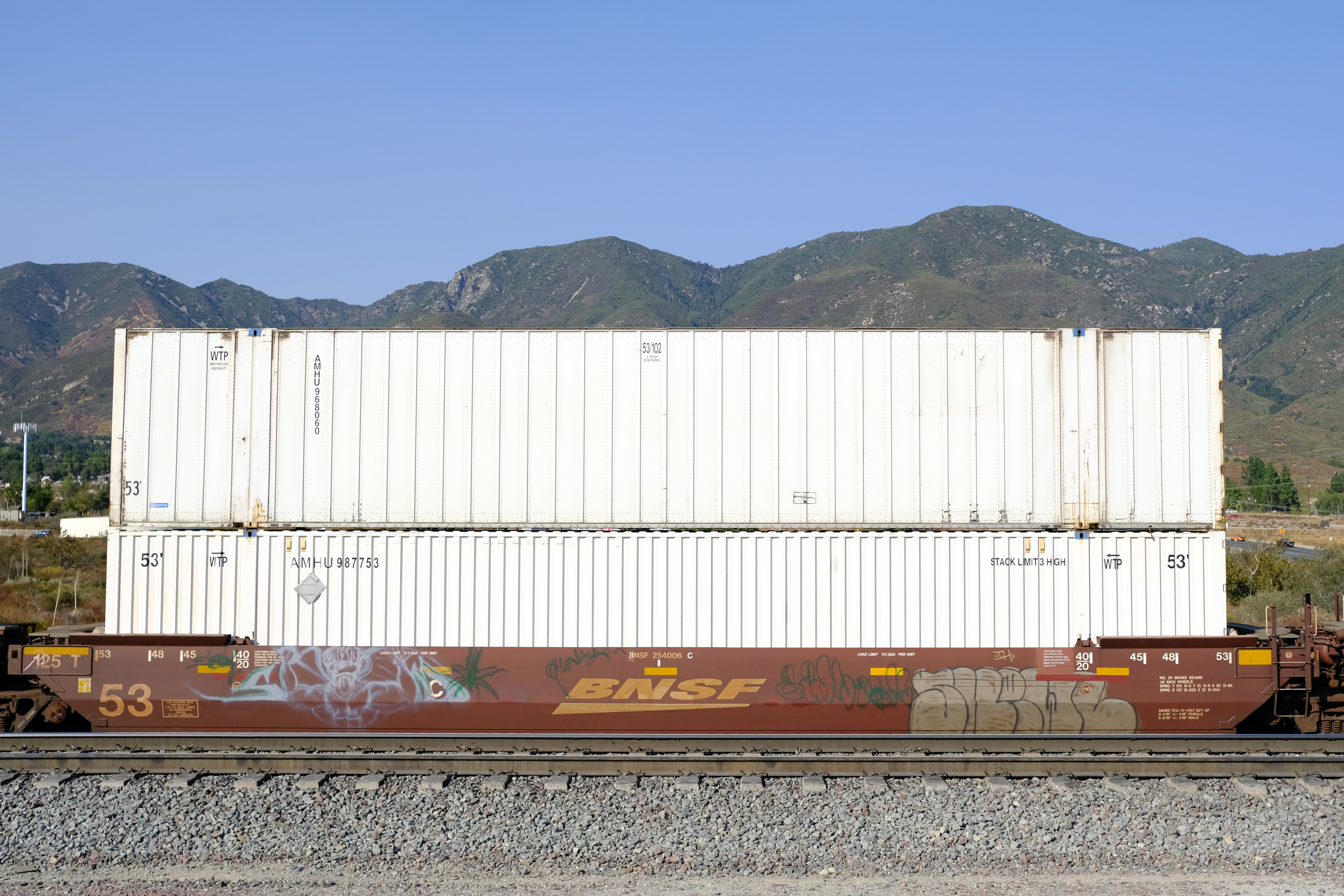
Wellcar

FreightCar America, Inc. is a manufacturer of freight cars for the railway industry. The company employs around 2,000 people, most of them at its 700,000 square foot manufacturing facility in Castaños, Mexico. In addition to the manufacturing facility, the company maintains a headquarters in Chicago and an engineering and parts facility in Johnstown, Pennsylvania.

== History ==
The company began operations in 1901, and is headquartered in Chicago, Illinois. It is engaged in the business of building, repairing, and leasing freight cars, largely for the transportation of bulk materials like coal, metals, wood products, and automobiles. In addition to the freight cars it constructs, the company also manufactures parts for use in cars built by other companies.

It formerly owned four American factories, in Johnstown, Pennsylvania, Danville, Illinois, Cherokee, Alabama and Roanoke, Virginia. The facility in Roanoke was closed in 2009 due to weak economic conditions, but it was announced on February 21, 2011, that it would reopen after an order for 1,500 coal cars from the Norfolk Southern Railway.

In 2008, the company produced 10,349 freight cars, but its output decreased to 3,377 cars in 2009. During fiscal year 2010, FreightCar America had a profit of $36.52 million on revenue of $141.3 million.

In June 2014, the Danville plant brought back over 100 employees with promises of work and being able to retire from the plant. They were set to be laid off indefinitely the end of February 2016.

On October 25, 2016, a mass shooting occurred at a FreightCar America building in Roanoke, Virginia. Getachew Fekede, a 53-year-old former employee and Kenyan refugee who moved to the U.S. in 2011, fired ten rounds from a 9mm handgun, killing an employee and wounding three others. He then committed suicide. The fatal victim was 56-year-old David Wesley Brown, a veteran of Operation desert storm. Police said the shooting appeared to be an act of workplace violence, but added that the possibility of terrorism would be investigated.

In mid-February 2017, the company announced layoffs at its Roanoke plant. This was followed by an announcement at the end of March 2017, that FreightCar America would idle the plant in June.

On August 2, 2018, it was announced that The Andersons Inc. had signed an agreement to purchase FreightCar America Inc.'s rail-car facility in Danville, Illinois. The Andersons' goal was to turn the former freight-car manufacturing plant into a full-service freight and tank rail-car repair shop. The Andersons Rail Group would provide rail-car repair, painting, blasting, cleaning, tank-car certification, and scrapping at the facility. Located along the CSX network, the 308,000-square-foot facility can store up to 400 rail cars.

On September 10, 2020, after receiving a $10 million Paycheck Protection Program loan intended to help businesses continue paying their workers, the company announced it planned to close its facility in Cherokee, Alabama by approximately the end of that year. Employee layoffs were to begin November 9, 2020, and continue in stages through February 28, 2021. The majority of layoffs were to occur in December 2020. Company president/CEO Jim Meyer cited "the depressed rail car market and the devastating impact and ongoing threat of COVID-19" as reasons for the decision. All of the company's manufacturing of new rail cars is now performed in Mexico, and its production of after market parts is manufactured in Pennsylvania.

In May 2022, the company announced CEO James Meyer would retire from the role upon the completion of a search process for a new CEO. In March 2024, Nicholas Randall, who had overseen the expansion of the company's manufacturing facility in Castaños, Mexico, was named the company's CEO; Meyer became the company’s executive chairman, remaining on the board of directors.

== Gallery ==
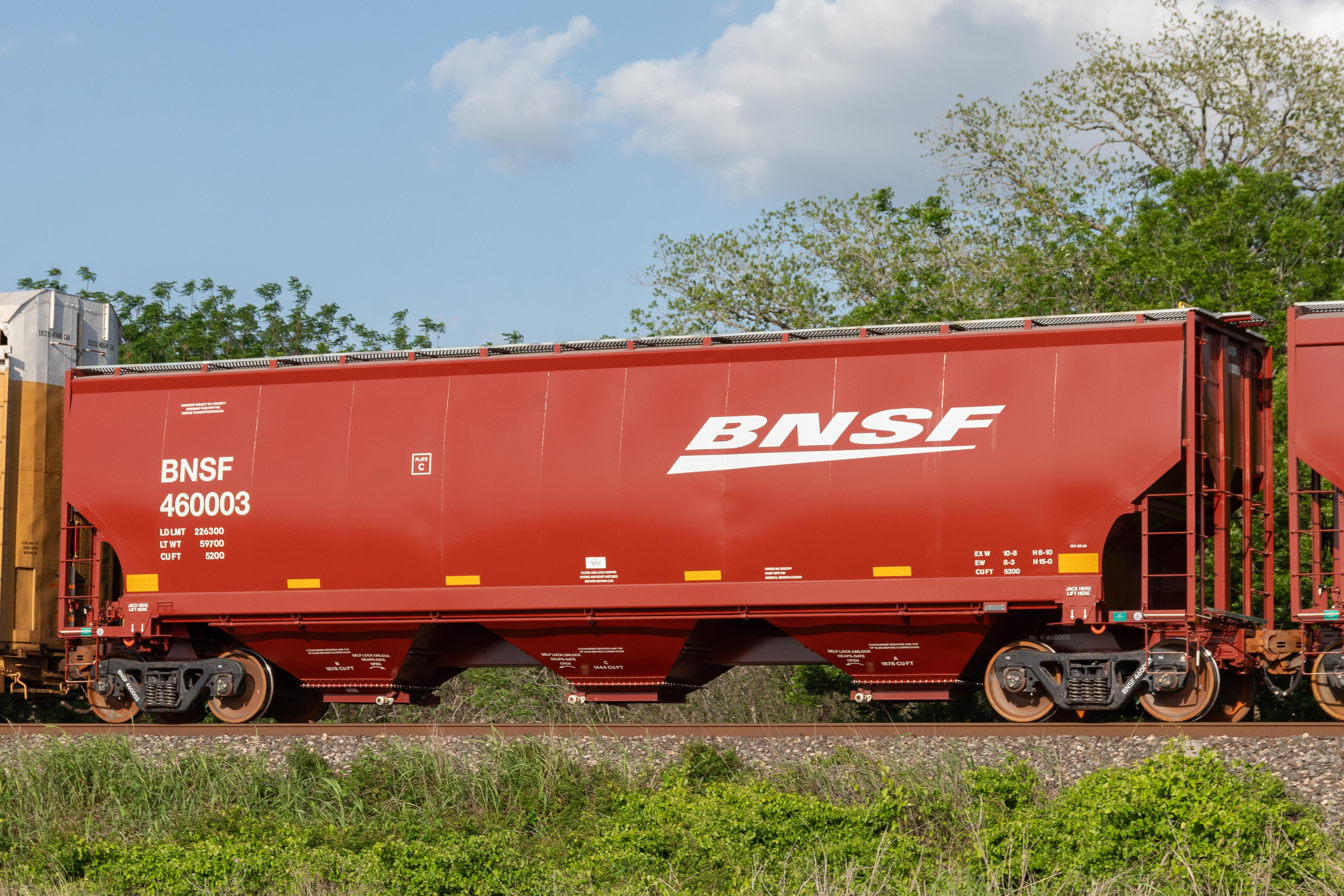
A FreightCar America covered hopper

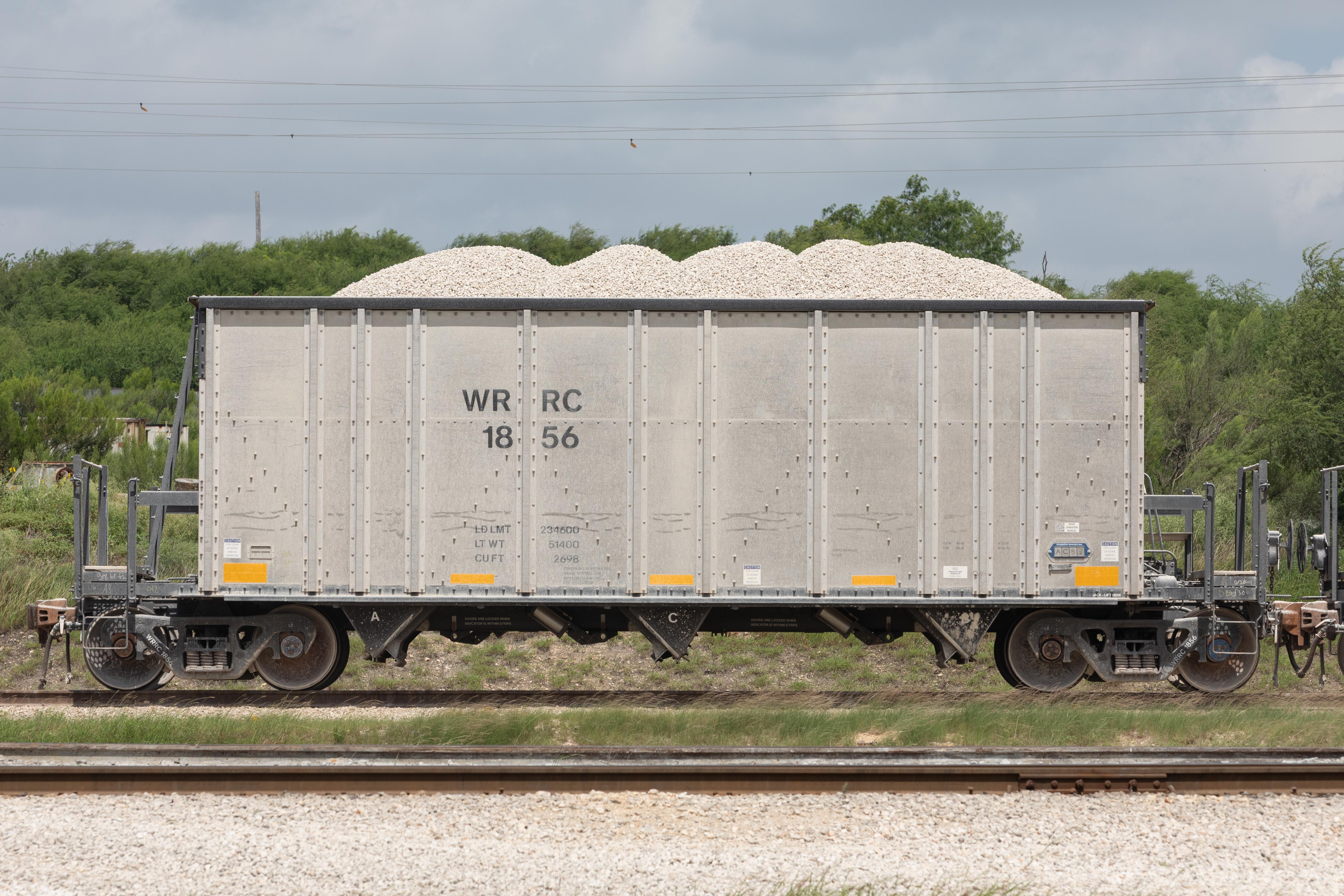
A FreightCar America aggregate hopper

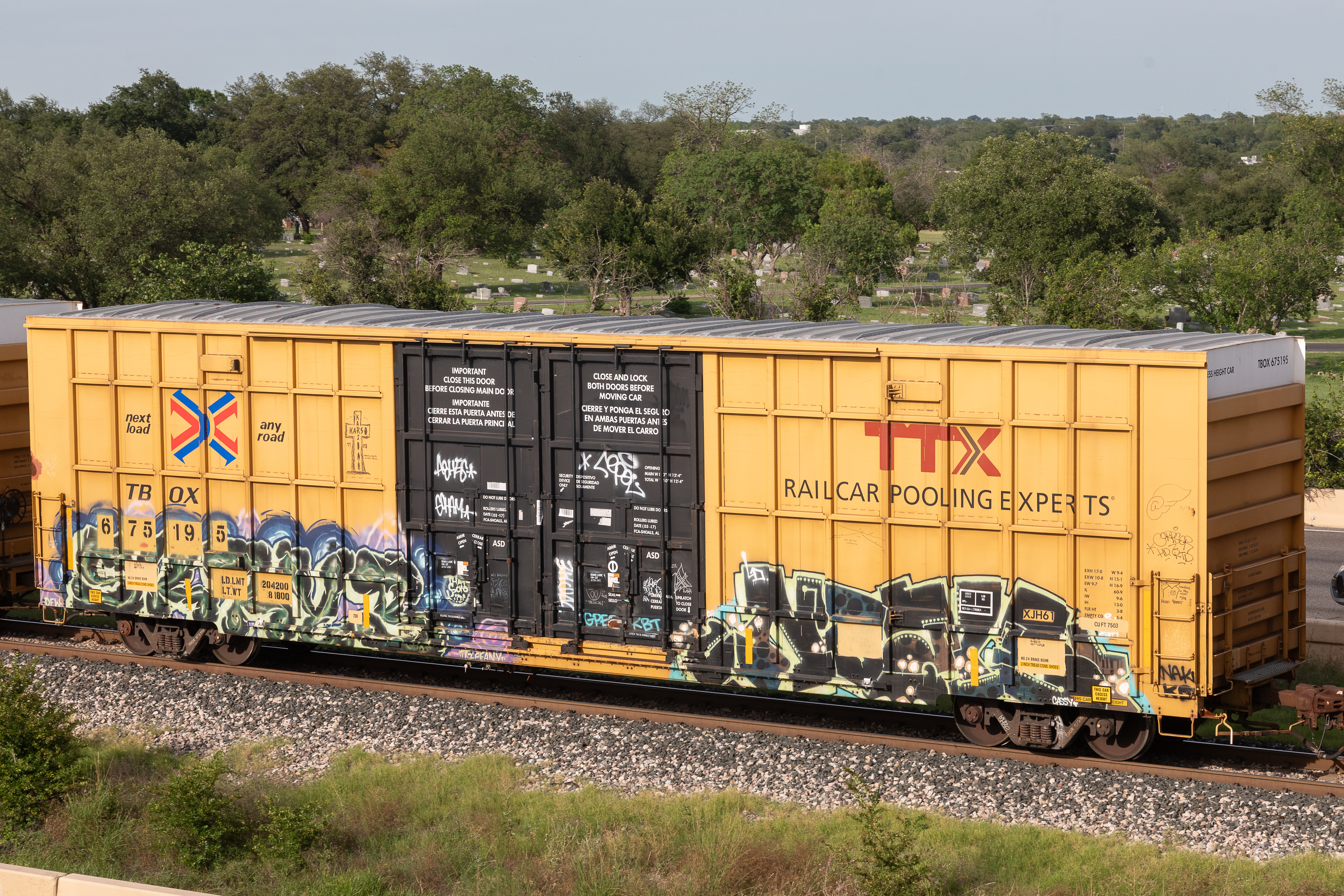
A FreightCar America boxcar

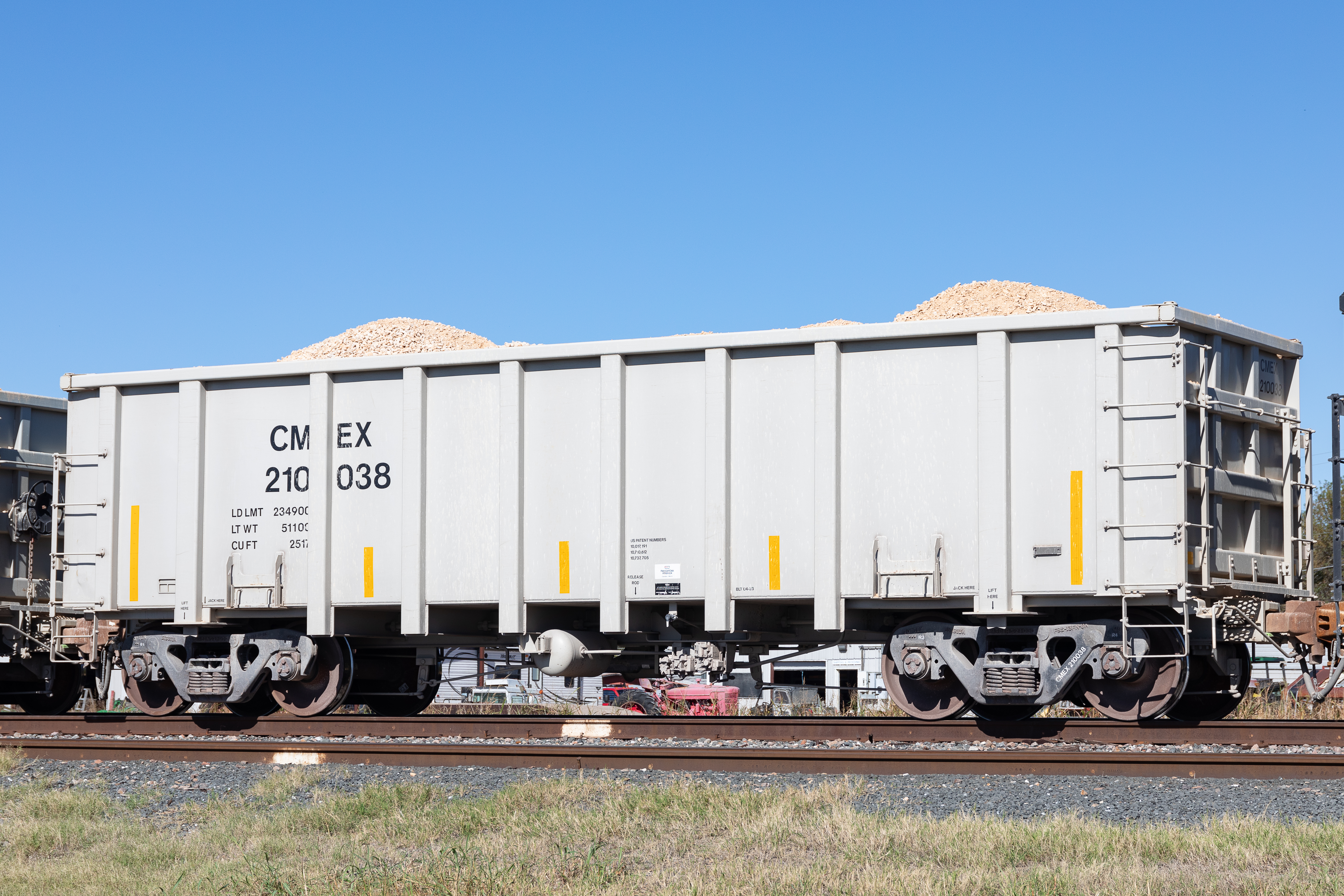
A FreightCar America aggregate gondola

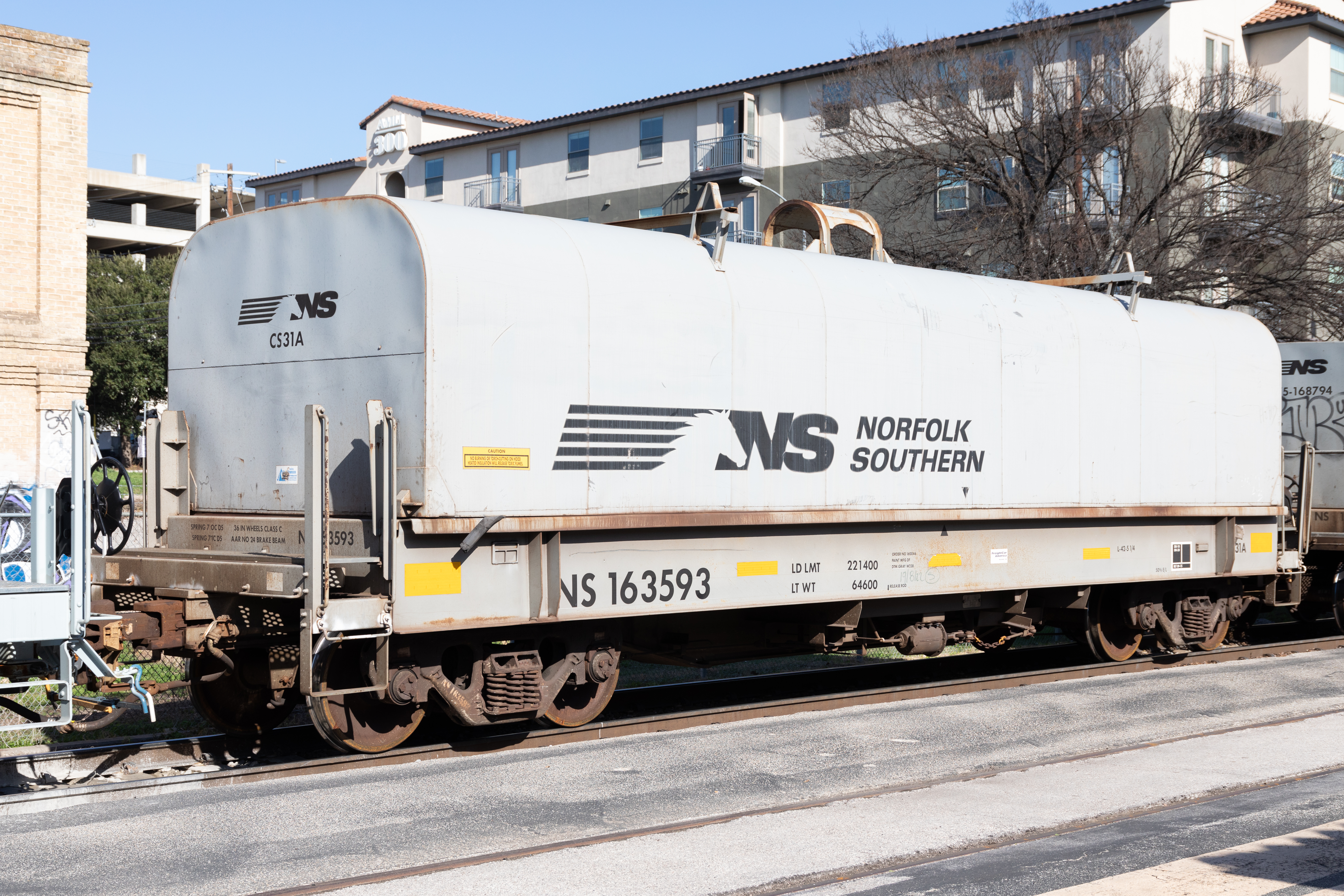
A FreightCar America coil car

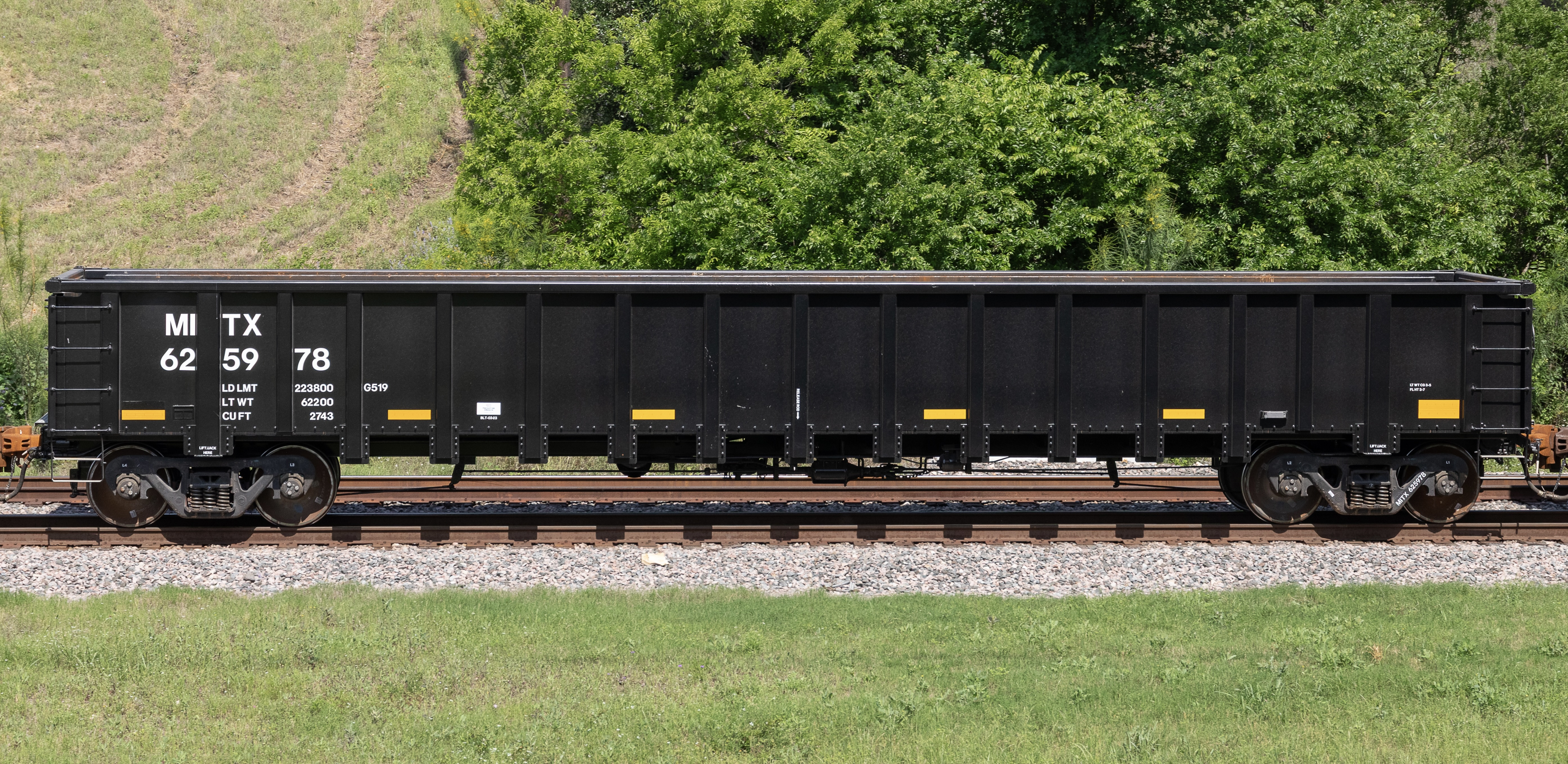
A FreightCar America gondola

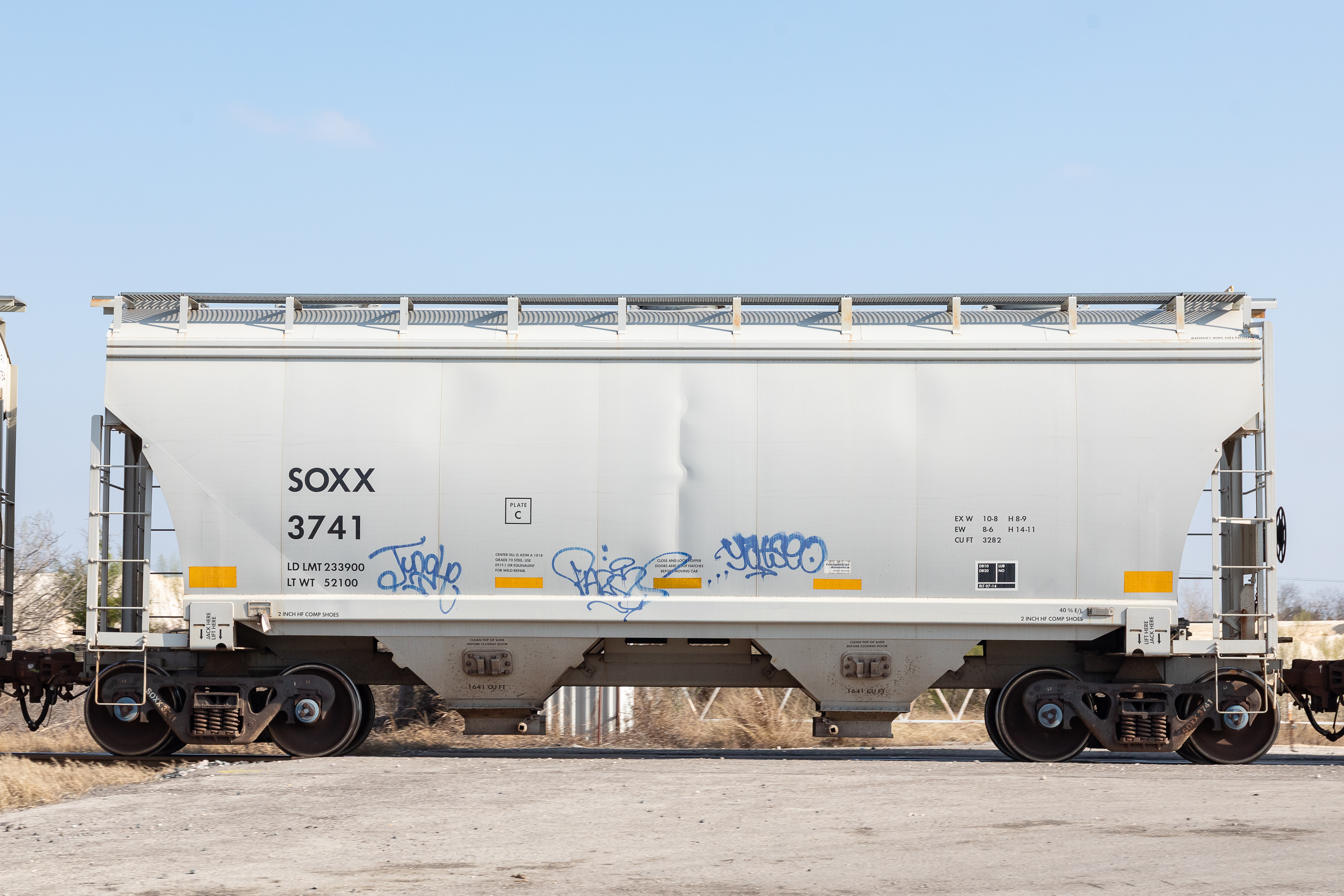
A FreightCar America covered hopper

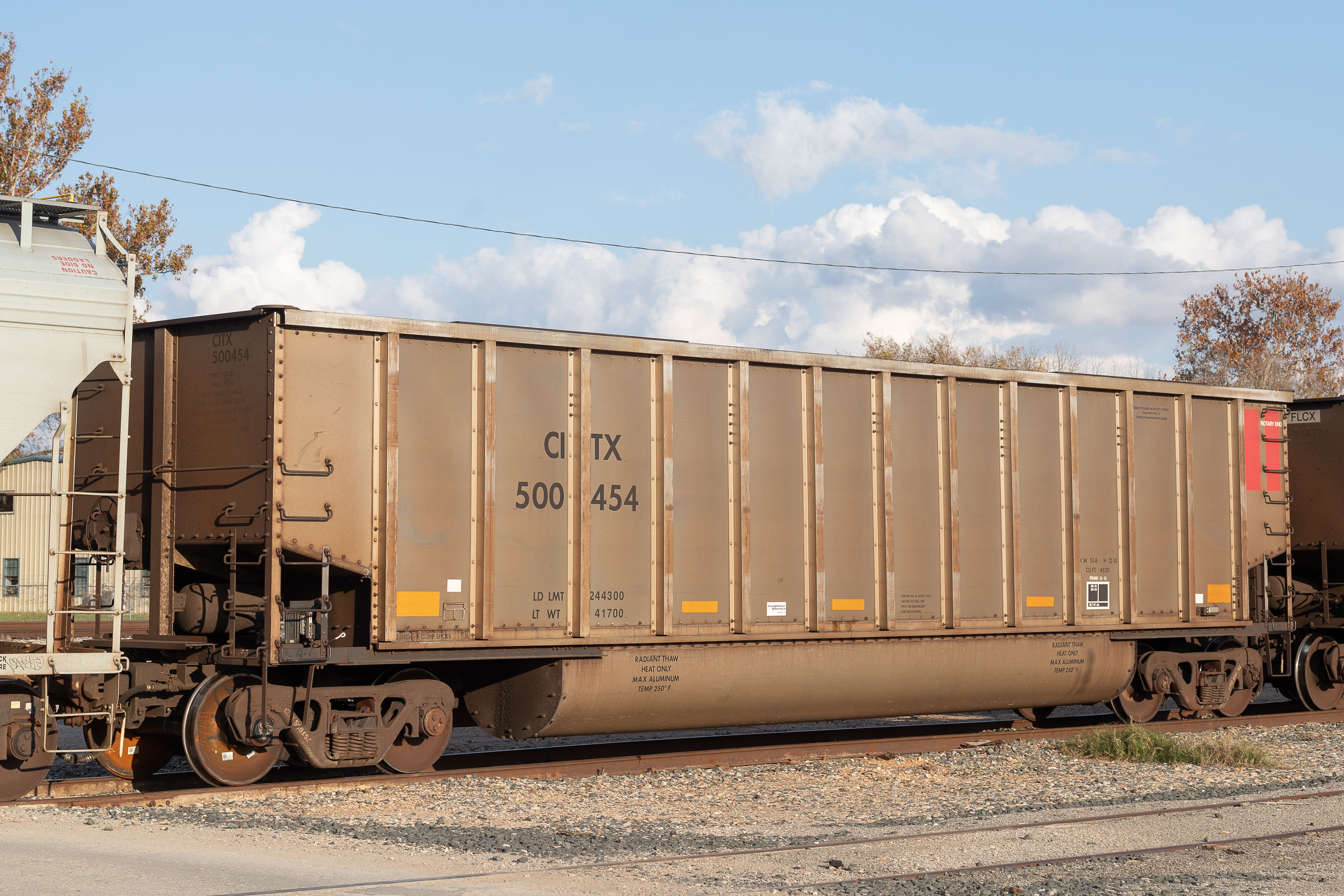
A FreightCar America bathtub gondola

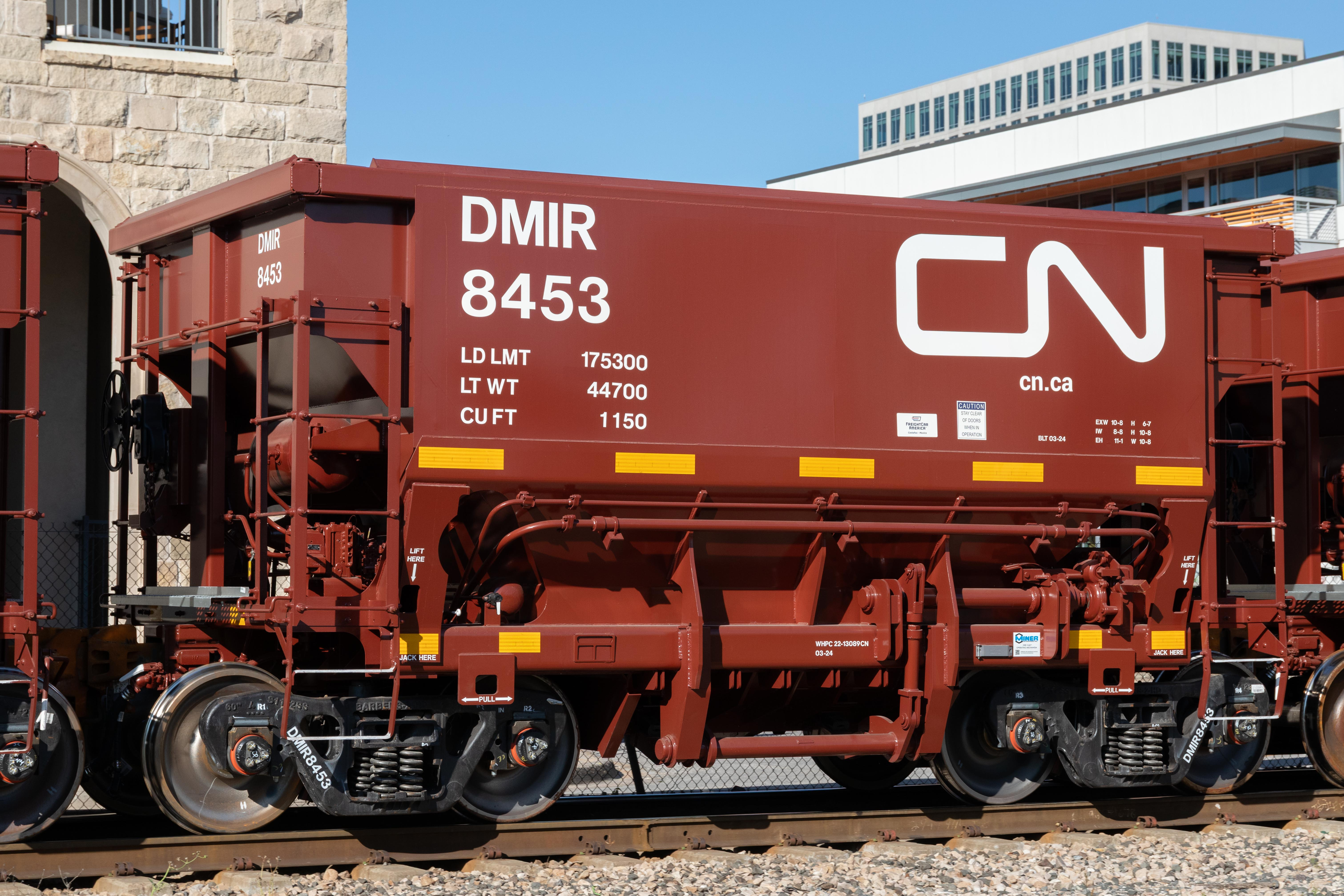
A FreightCar America ore car

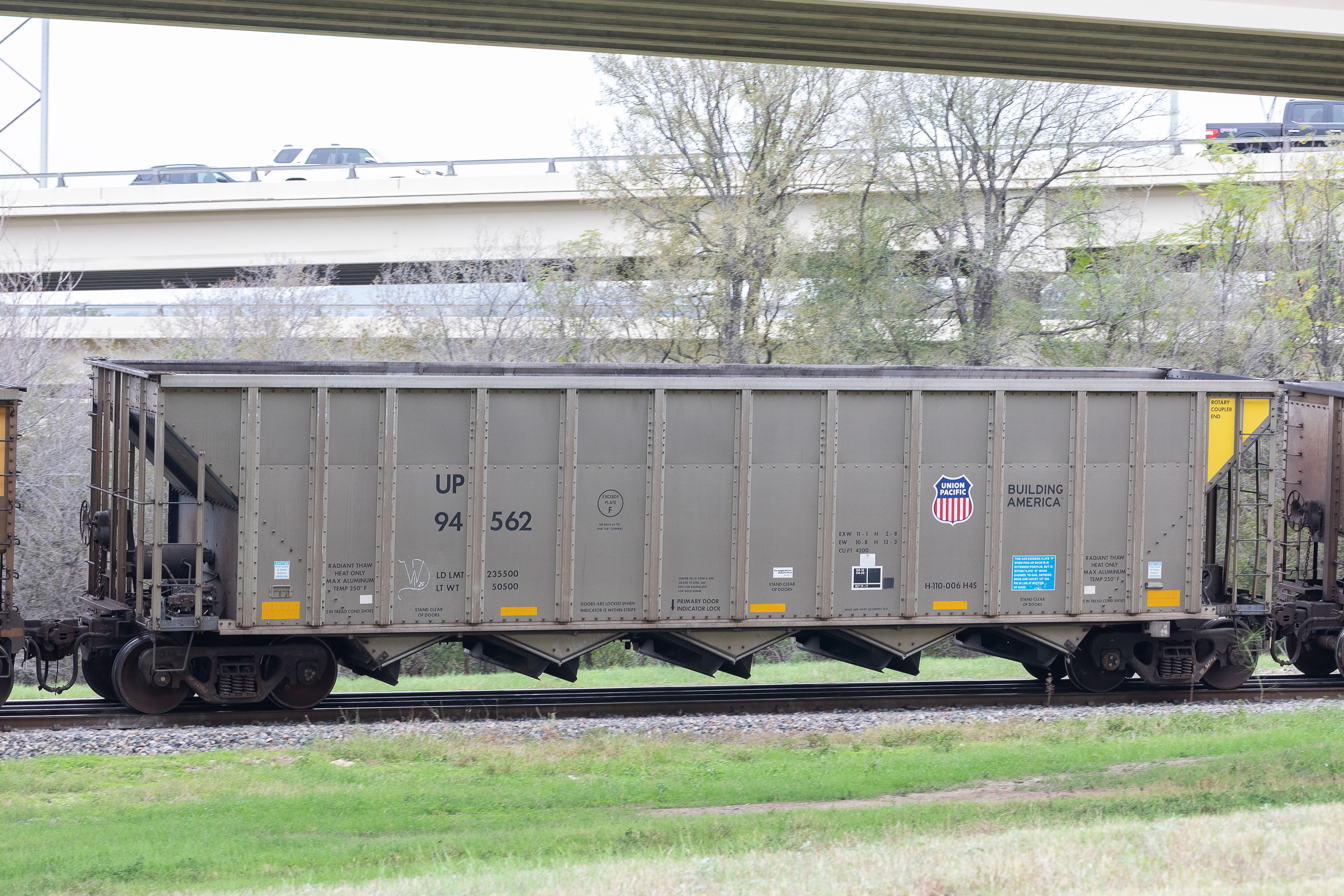
A FreightCar America coal hopper

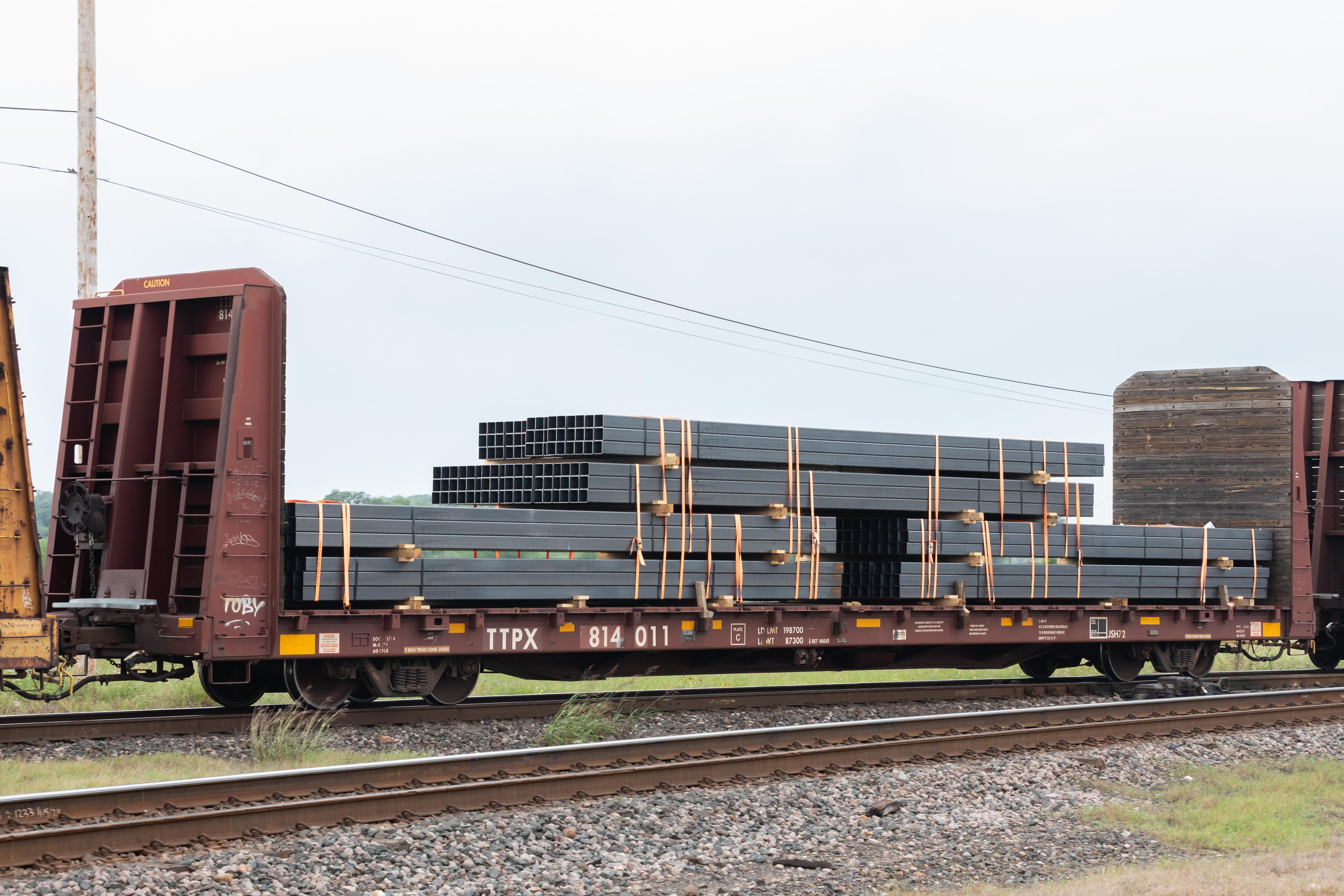
A FreightCar America bulkhead flatcar
