= Castaños Municipality =

Municipality in the Mexican state of Coahuila

Castaños
- Municipality
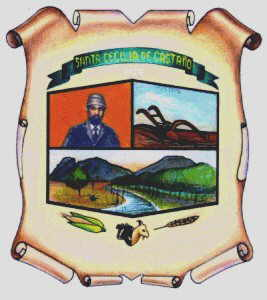
- Coat of arms

- Municipality of Castaños in Coahuila
- Coordinates: 26°47′3″N 101°25′58″W
- Country: Mexico
- State: Coahuila
- Founded: 1877
- Named for: Gaspar Castaño de Sosa
- Seat: Castaños
- Largest city: Castaños

Area
  - Total: 7,860 km^{2} (3,030 sq mi)

Population (2005)
  - Total: 23,871

Castaños is one of the 38 municipalities of Coahuila, in north-eastern Mexico. The municipal seat lies at Castaños. The municipality covers an area of 7860 km^{2}.

As of 2005, the municipality had a total population of 23,871.

== See also ==
- Wells of Baján
