= Abasolo Municipality, Coahuila =

Municipality in the Mexican state of Coahuila

Abasolo
- Municipality
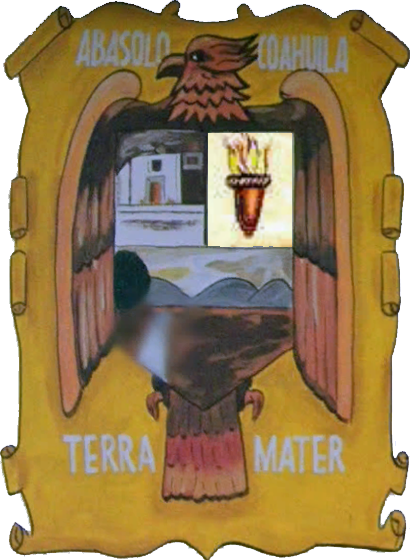
- Coat of arms

- Municipality of Abasolo in Coahuila

- Location in Mexico
- Coordinates: 27°10′56″N 101°25′31″W
- Country: Mexico
- State: Coahuila
- Municipal seat: Abasolo

Area
  - Total: 645.9 km^{2} (249.4 sq mi)

Population (2005)
  - Total: 991

Abasolo is one of the 38 municipalities of Coahuila, in north-eastern Mexico. The municipal seat lies at Abasolo. The municipality covers an area of 645.9 km^{2}.

As of 2005, the municipality had a total population of 991.

== Geography ==
=== Climate ===
Climate data for Abasolo
Month	Jan	Feb	Mar	Apr	May	Jun	Jul	Aug	Sep	Oct	Nov	Dec	Year
Mean daily maximum °C (°F)	20 (68)	23.1 (73.6)	27.9 (82.2)	30.7 (87.3)	33.4 (92.1)	35.2 (95.4)	34.9 (94.8)	34.8 (94.6)	33.5 (92.3)	29.6 (85.3)	24.5 (76.1)	20.6 (69.1)	29.0 (84.2)
Mean daily minimum °C (°F)	4.3 (39.7)	5.9 (42.6)	9.6 (49.3)	13 (55)	18 (64)	20.2 (68.4)	20.5 (68.9)	20.6 (69.1)	18.1 (64.6)	13.3 (55.9)	8.3 (46.9)	5.3 (41.5)	13.1 (55.6)
Average precipitation mm (inches)	7.6 (0.3)	10 (0.4)	10 (0.4)	15 (0.6)	43 (1.7)	30 (1.2)	20 (0.8)	23 (0.9)	33 (1.3)	20 (0.8)	13 (0.5)	7.6 (0.3)	230 (9.1)
Source: Weatherbase
