= Juárez Municipality, Coahuila =

Municipality in the Mexican state of Coahuila

Juárez
- Municipality
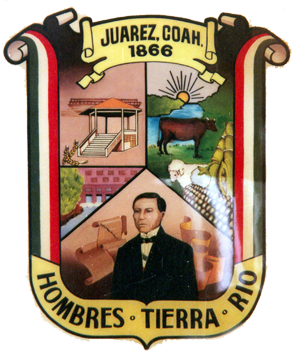
- Coat of arms

- Municipality of Juárez in Coahuila

- Location in Mexico
- Coordinates: 27°36′25″N 100°43′34″W
- Country: Mexico
- State: Coahuila
- Municipal seat: Juárez

Area
  - Total: 2,971.3 km^{2} (1,147.2 sq mi)

Population (2005)
  - Total: 1,393

Juárez is one of the 38 municipalities of Coahuila, in Northeastern Mexico with Don Margarito Garcia as Municipal President (January 2010 – July 2010). The municipal seat lies at Juárez. The municipality covers an area of 2,971.3 km^{2} (1,147.2 sq mi). As of 2005, the municipality had a total population of 1,393.

== Climate ==
Climate data for Juarez (1991–2020)
Month	Jan	Feb	Mar	Apr	May	Jun	Jul	Aug	Sep	Oct	Nov	Dec	Year
Record high °C (°F)	40.0 (104.0)	46.0 (114.8)	49.0 (120.2)	49.0 (120.2)	53.0 (127.4)	50.0 (122.0)	50.0 (122.0)	50.0 (122.0)	49.0 (120.2)	42.0 (107.6)	43.0 (109.4)	38.5 (101.3)	53.0 (127.4)
Mean daily maximum °C (°F)	16.9 (62.4)	19.8 (67.6)	24.6 (76.3)	29.3 (84.7)	34.5 (94.1)	38.8 (101.8)	39.5 (103.1)	38.9 (102.0)	34.9 (94.8)	29.8 (85.6)	22.9 (73.2)	17.8 (64.0)	29.0 (84.1)
Daily mean °C (°F)	10.6 (51.1)	13.6 (56.5)	17.1 (62.8)	21.2 (70.2)	25.5 (77.9)	29.5 (85.1)	30.4 (86.7)	30.2 (86.4)	27.4 (81.3)	22.3 (72.1)	16.1 (61.0)	11.3 (52.3)	21.2 (70.2)
Mean daily minimum °C (°F)	4.2 (39.6)	6.5 (43.7)	9.6 (49.3)	13.1 (55.6)	16.6 (61.9)	20.2 (68.4)	21.4 (70.5)	21.6 (70.9)	19.9 (67.8)	14.8 (58.6)	9.2 (48.6)	4.8 (40.6)	13.5 (56.3)
Record low °C (°F)	−11.5 (11.3)	−10.5 (13.1)	−3.0 (26.6)	−0.2 (31.6)	2.8 (37.0)	9.0 (48.2)	11.0 (51.8)	9.0 (48.2)	1.0 (33.8)	−0.6 (30.9)	−4.0 (24.8)	−4.5 (23.9)	−11.5 (11.3)
Average precipitation mm (inches)	12.0 (0.47)	6.4 (0.25)	10.6 (0.42)	25.3 (1.00)	31.7 (1.25)	24.9 (0.98)	27.1 (1.07)	29.5 (1.16)	62.4 (2.46)	28.1 (1.11)	10.5 (0.41)	13.2 (0.52)	281.7 (11.09)
Average precipitation days (≥ 0.1 mm)	2.2	1.6	2.0	2.2	3.2	2.2	2.5	2.6	4.6	2.7	1.9	1.8	29.5
Source: Servicio Meteorologico Nacional
