= San Antonio de las Alazanas =

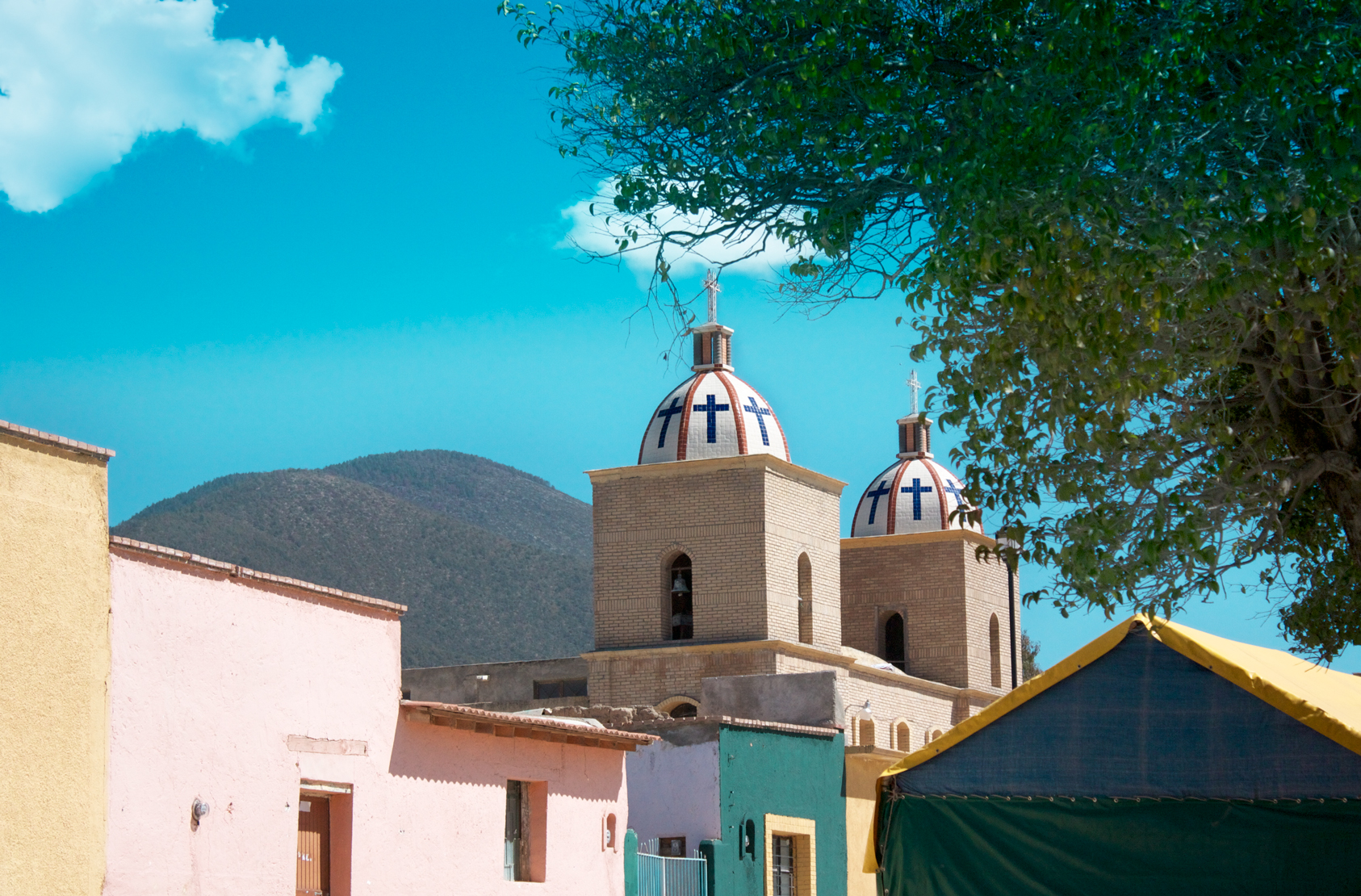
- San Antonio de las Alazanas, view from the main square

- Location within Mexico
- Coordinates: 25°16′21″N 100°34′45″W
- Country: Mexico
- State: Coahuila
- Municipality: Arteaga
- Elevation: 2,180 m (7,150 ft)

Population (2000)
  - Total: 2,235
- Time zone: UTC-6 (CST)
- Postal code: 25370

San Antonio de las Alazanas is a settlement located in the municipality of Arteaga, in the southeast of the Mexican state of Coahuila. It is located in the Sierra Madre Oriental range at a height of 2,180 meters (7,150 ft) above sea level.

This town is famous for its apple and quince plantations, with these fruits the villagers prepare fruit liquors, jams, sweets and other products.

It is situated in a valley rounded by huge mountains full of pines and has a mild weather that makes it the ideal place for tourism. Near San Antonio de las Alazanas you can find Monterreal and Mesa de las Tablas. Other tourist attractions are the Mummy Museum and the traditional Apple Fair celebrated each September.
