= Arteaga Municipality =

Arteaga Municipality may refer to one of two municipalities in Mexico:

- Arteaga Municipality, Michoacán
- Arteaga Municipality, Coahuila
