= List of ski areas and resorts in North America =

This is a list of ski areas and resorts in North America.

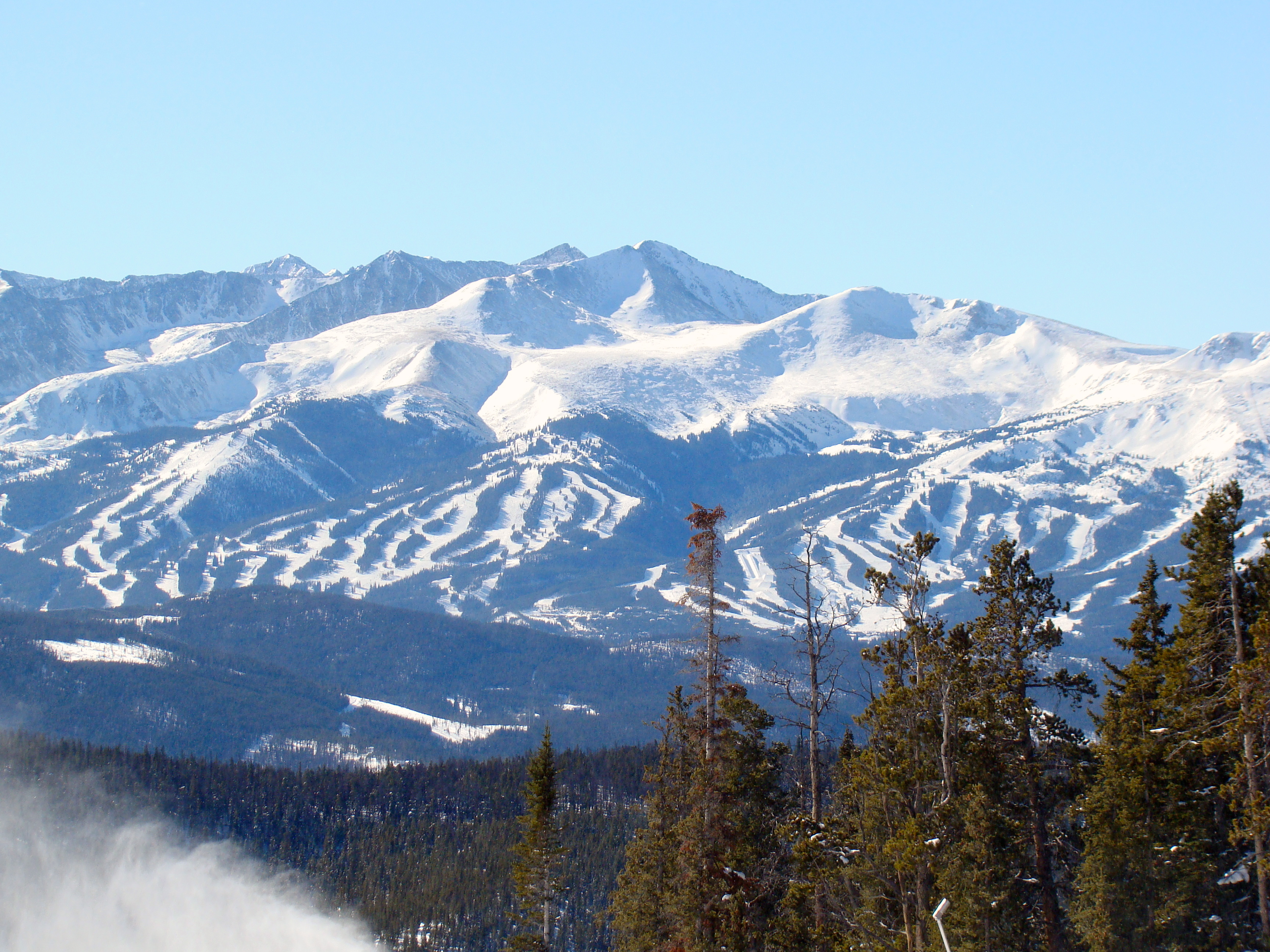
Peaks 8,9, and 10 of Breckenridge Ski Resort in Colorado.

== Greenland (Denmark) ==
- See footnote

== Mexico ==
- Monterreal
