= Monterreal =

Ski resort in Arteaga, Coahuila, Mexico

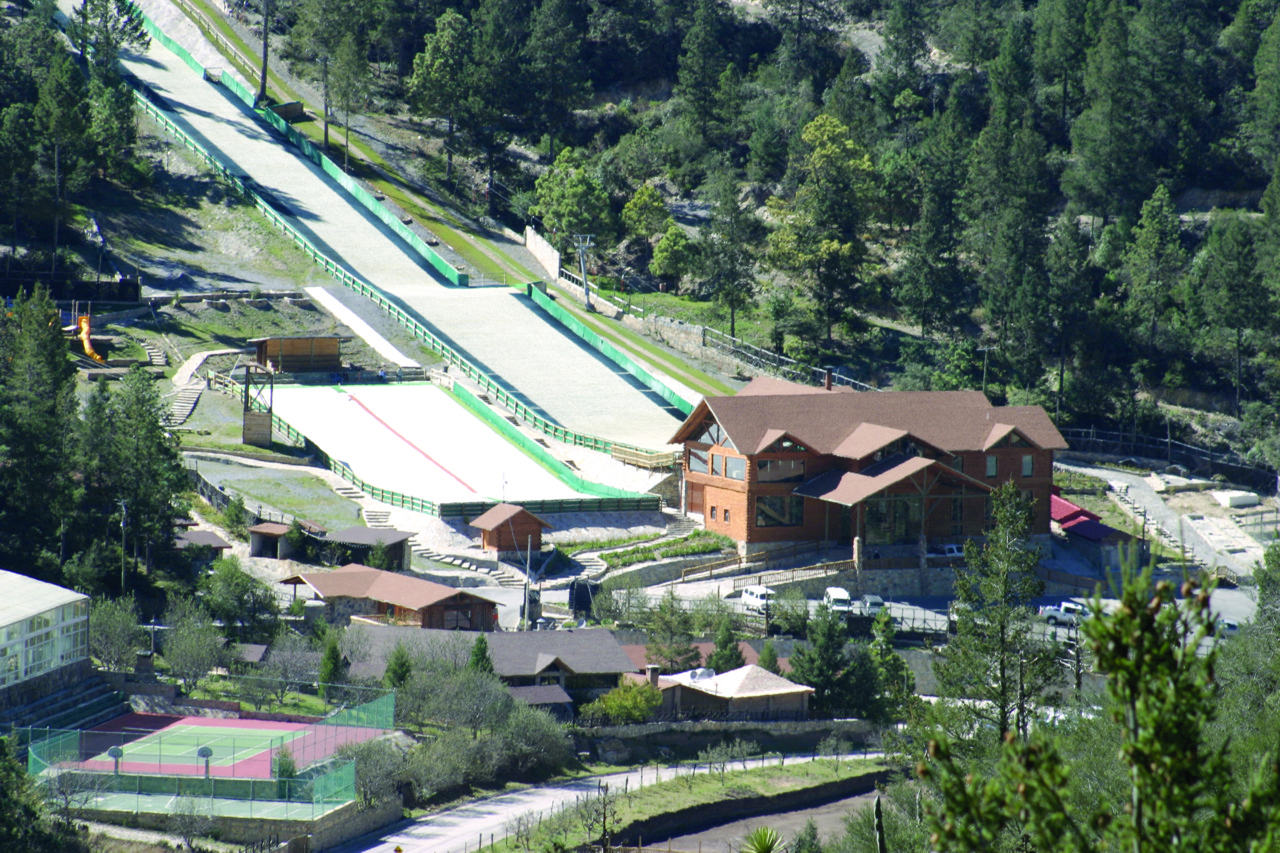
- Monterreal, Artega, Coahuila.
- Interactive map of Monterreal
- Location: Arteaga, Coahuila, Mexico
- Nearest city: Saltillo
- Coordinates: 25°14′3.34″N 100°26′14.56″W
- Top elevation: 3,445 m (11,302 ft)
- Base elevation: 2,940 m (9,650 ft)
- Skiable area: 4.6 km (2.85 mi)
- Lift system: 2 surface lifts
- Snowmaking: yes
- Website: http://www.monterreal.com

Monterreal (Spanish pronunciation: [montereˈal]) is a small ski resort situated in the municipality of Arteaga, in the southeast of the Mexican state of Coahuila, located 40 minutes from Saltillo and 90 minutes from Monterrey. It is the only commercial ski center in Mexico.

The Monterreal ski center has two runs. The main slope has a run of 230 m (754.6 ft). A separate 45 m (148 ft) long slope was specially designed for beginners and toboggans.

The main slope has a spring-box type drag lift and the teaching/play area has a conveyor type lift. The main track has a slope of about 20 degrees. In terms of difficulty, it can be considered as a blue run.

It is generally possible to ski between December and February, with natural snow.

== Climate ==
Monterreal features a Cold semi-arid climate BSk according to (Köppen) or BSlk (Trewartha) climate. The surrounding mountains capture more moisture and receive higher levels of precipitation, featuring an Oceanic climate. While the summer months witness the majority of precipitation, snow showers in winter are common when cold fronts from Texas reach the Sierra Madre Oriental.

Climate data for Jame, Coauhila (1981-2010 period). Elevation: 2,759 metres (9,052 ft)
Month	Jan	Feb	Mar	Apr	May	Jun	Jul	Aug	Sep	Oct	Nov	Dec	Year
Mean daily maximum °C (°F)	16.1 (61.0)	17.4 (63.3)	20.0 (68.0)	22.1 (71.8)	24.2 (75.6)	24.2 (75.6)	22.3 (72.1)	21.9 (71.4)	20.8 (69.4)	20.8 (69.4)	18.8 (65.8)	16.3 (61.3)	20.4 (68.7)
Daily mean °C (°F)	8.2 (46.8)	9.3 (48.7)	11.3 (52.3)	13.5 (56.3)	15.4 (59.7)	16.2 (61.2)	14.9 (58.8)	14.5 (58.1)	13.4 (56.1)	12.7 (54.9)	10.5 (50.9)	8.5 (47.3)	12.4 (54.3)
Mean daily minimum °C (°F)	0.3 (32.5)	1.3 (34.3)	2.6 (36.7)	5.0 (41.0)	6.7 (44.1)	8.1 (46.6)	7.5 (45.5)	7.1 (44.8)	6.0 (42.8)	4.6 (40.3)	2.1 (35.8)	0.7 (33.3)	4.3 (39.7)
Average precipitation mm (inches)	21.0 (0.83)	19.6 (0.77)	12.2 (0.48)	20.0 (0.79)	38.4 (1.51)	51.2 (2.02)	64.8 (2.55)	66.9 (2.63)	53.9 (2.12)	36.6 (1.44)	14.0 (0.55)	12.1 (0.48)	410.7 (16.17)
Source: Mexican Meteorological Service SMN.Conagua "SMN.Conagua". Retrieved on October 26, 2020.
