= Arteaga, Coahuila =

City in the Mexican state of Coahuila

Arteaga
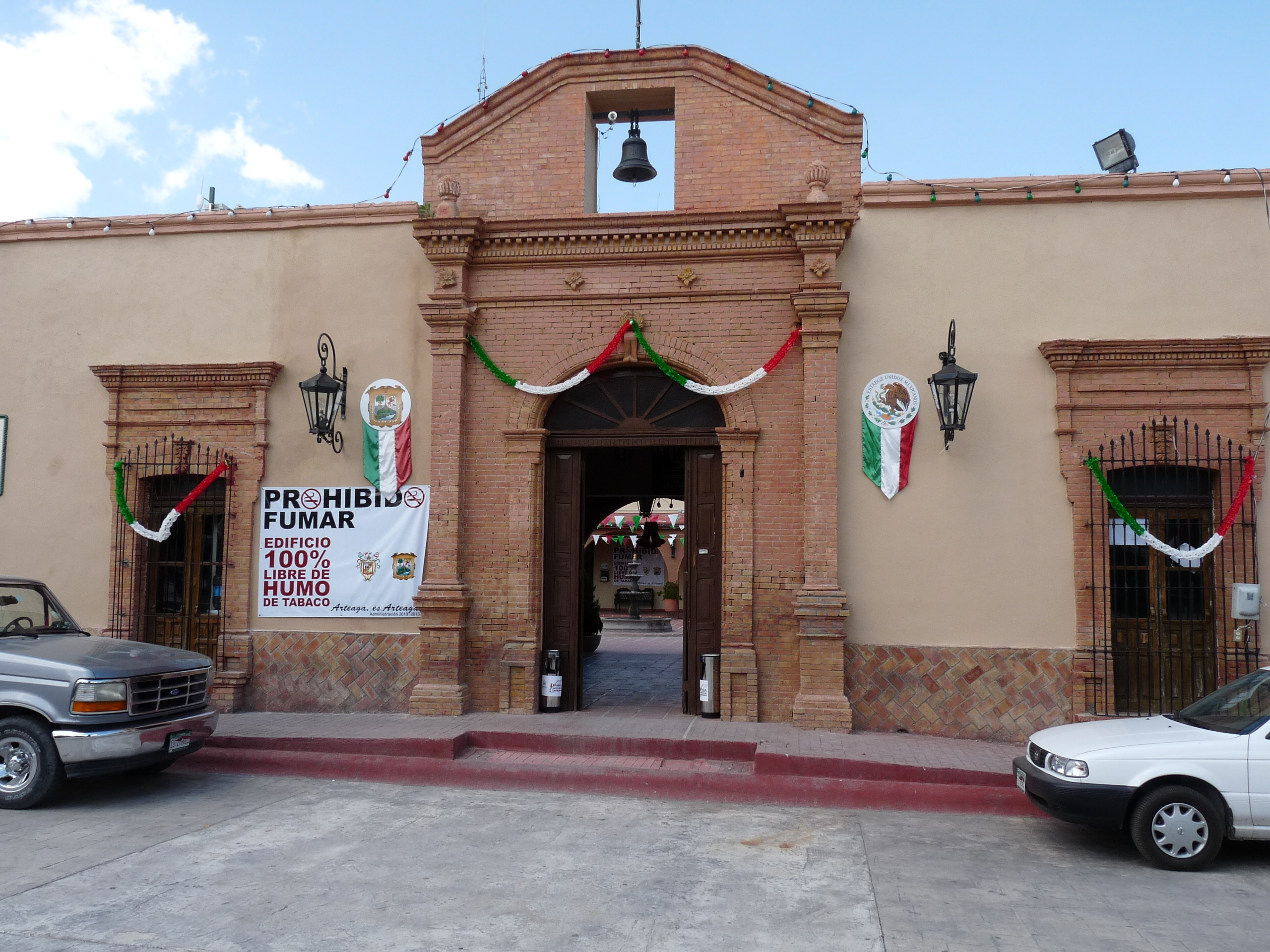
- Arteaga City Hall

- Location within Coahuila Location within Mexico
- Coordinates: 25°27′N 100°50′W
- Country: Mexico
- State: Coahuila
- Municipality: Arteaga
- Founded: 31 October 1591 (Francisco de Urdiñola)

Government
  - Mayor: Ramiro Durán García
- Elevation: 1,680 m (5,510 ft)

Population (2000)
  - Total: 6,042
- Time zone: UTC-6 (Zona Centro)
- Postal code: 25350

Arteaga (Spanish pronunciation: [aɾteˈaɣa]) is a town that is part of the Saltillo metropolitan area located in the Mexican state of Coahuila. It has been recognized as a Pueblo Mágico by Mexico's Secretariat of Tourism. It serves as the administrative centre for the surrounding municipality of the same name.

== Geography ==
It stands some 14 kilometres (8.7 mi) east of state capital Saltillo, on Federal Highways 57 and 54.

The municipality covers a total surface area of 1,818.60 square kilometers (702.17 sq mi) and, in 1995, reported a total population of 18,907. In addition to the municipal seat, it contains the settlements of San Antonio de las Alazanas, El Tunal, San Juan de los Dolores, Huachichil, Los Lirios, Mesa de Tablas, Bella Unión, Escobedo, and Jamé.

=== Climate ===
Arteaga residents often boast that they have a year-round median temperature of 22 °C (72 °F), and say theirs is the "most perfect" climate in North America.

== History ==
The area was first inhabited by settlers from Tlaxcala in 1580, who named it San Isidro de las Palomas. On 29 December 1866 it was renamed in honour of General José María Arteaga Magallanes, a 19th-century national hero and governor of the state of Querétaro de Arteaga.

It includes the congregation of Landeros, which was named after an American soldier of Irish descent, who after the army's march through the area in the 1840s, settled there.
