= Saltillo metropolitan area =

Saltillo Metropolitan Area
- Metropolitan Area
- Zona Metropolitana de Saltillo (Spanish)

Population (2022)
  - Total: 1,073,400

The Saltillo metropolitan area, also known as Greater Saltillo, refers to the surrounding urban agglomeration of the capital city of the mexican state of Coahuila: Saltillo. Officially called Area Metropolitana de la Ciudad de Saltillo. Saltillo metropolitan area is composed of the municipalities of: Ramos Arizpe, Arteaga and Derramadero. It has an area of 14,009.3 km² as well as a population of 1,073,400 inhabitants as of 2022. It is the fifteenth largest metropolis in the country and the largest metropolitan area in terms of area in the state of Coahuila. Also, it is the seventh place among the metropolitan areas with the highest GDP in the country, thus becoming the wealthiest metropolitan area in the state of Coahuila de Zaragoza.
