= Ski resort =

Resort developed for skiing, snowboarding, and other winter sports

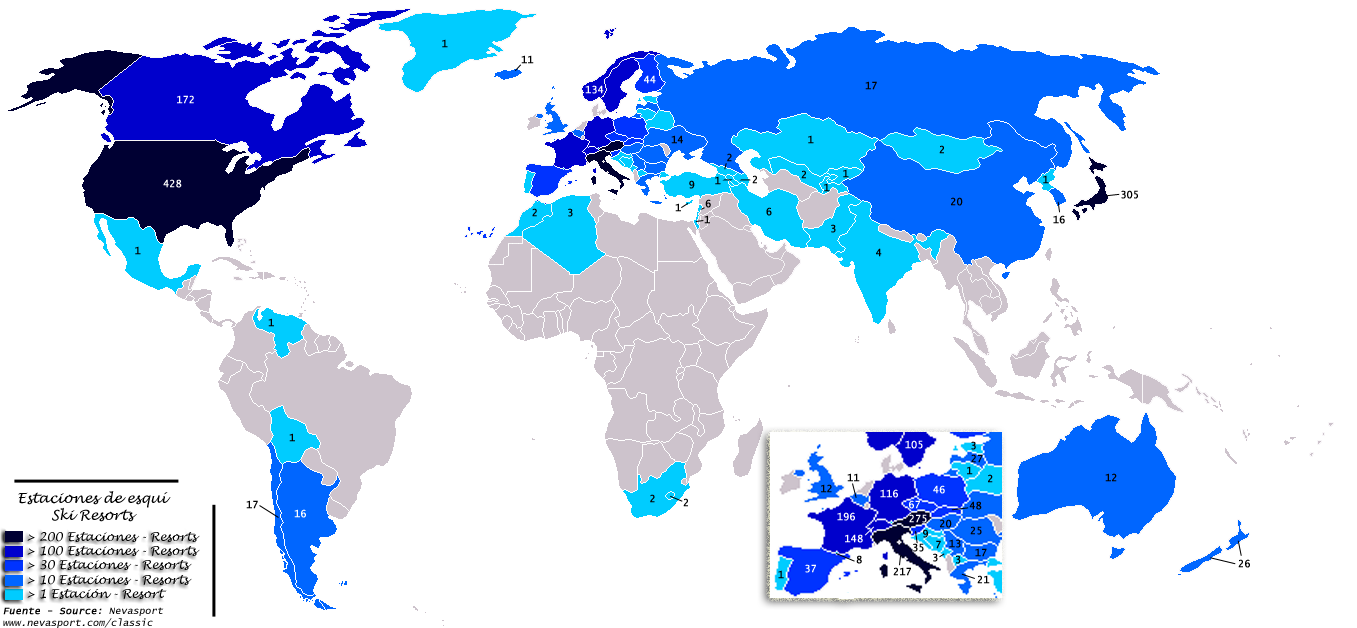
Ski resorts in the world by country

A ski resort is a resort developed for skiing, snowboarding, and other winter sports. In Europe, most ski resorts are towns or villages in or adjacent to a ski area, a mountainous area with pistes (marked ski trails) and a ski lift system. In North America, it is more common for ski areas to exist well away from towns, so ski resorts usually are destination resorts, often purpose-built and self-contained, where skiing is the main activity.

== Ski resort ==
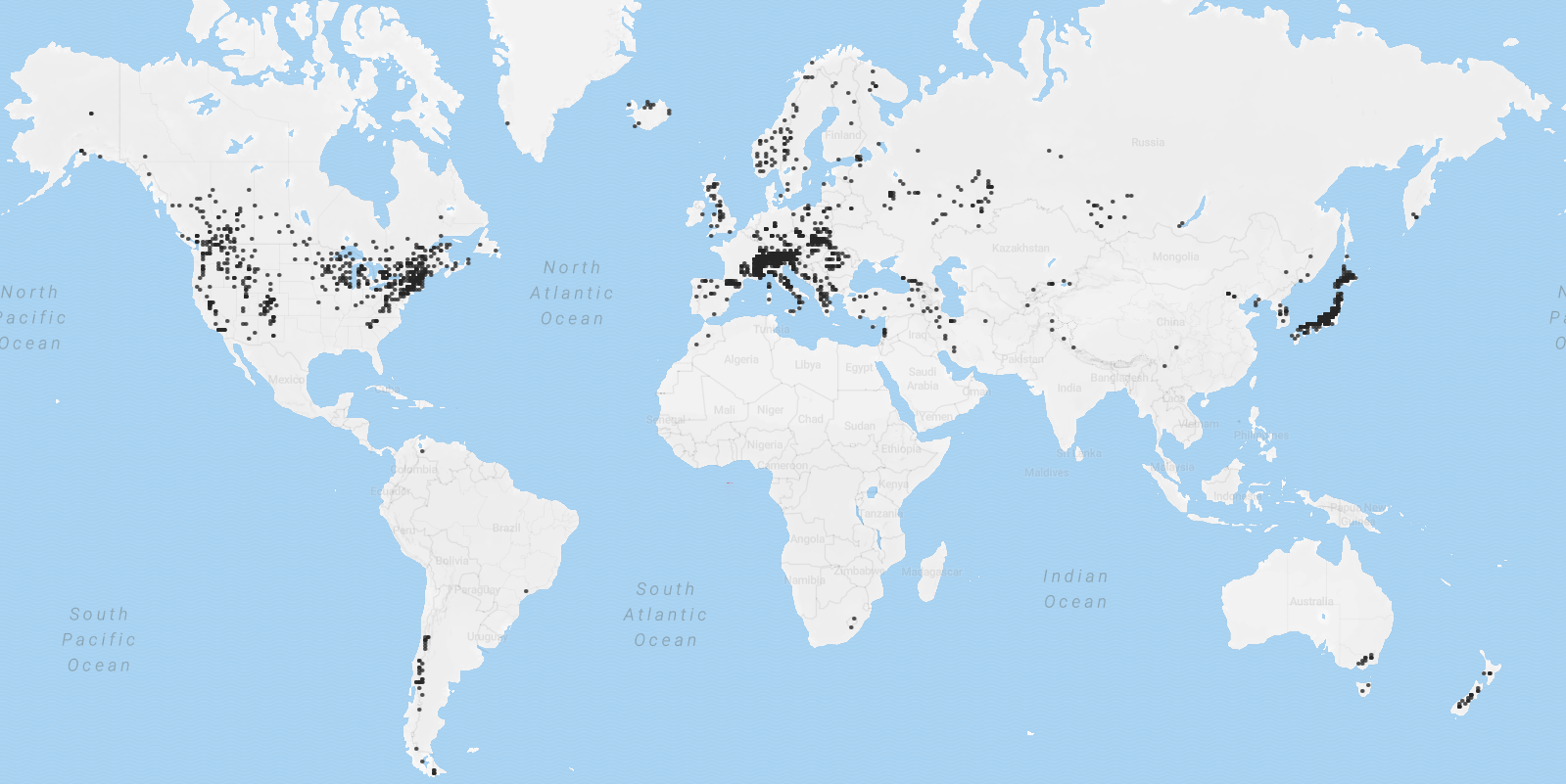
Map of world ski resorts

Ski resorts are located in both hemispheres, on all continents except Antarctica. They typically are located on mountains, as they require a large slope. They also need to receive sufficient snow (at least in combination with artificial snowmaking, unless the resort uses dry ski slopes).

High concentrations of ski resorts are located in the Alps, Scandinavia, western and eastern North America, and Japan. There are also ski resorts in the Andes, scattered across central Asia, and in Australia and New Zealand.

Extreme locations of non-indoor (at least one ski lift outside) ski resorts include:

- The most northern ski resort near Tromsø, Norway
- The most southern ski resort near Ushuaia, Argentina
- The ski resort closest to the equator from the north, near Lijiang, China.
- The ski resort closest to the equator from the south, near Mahlasela, Lesotho.

== Types ==
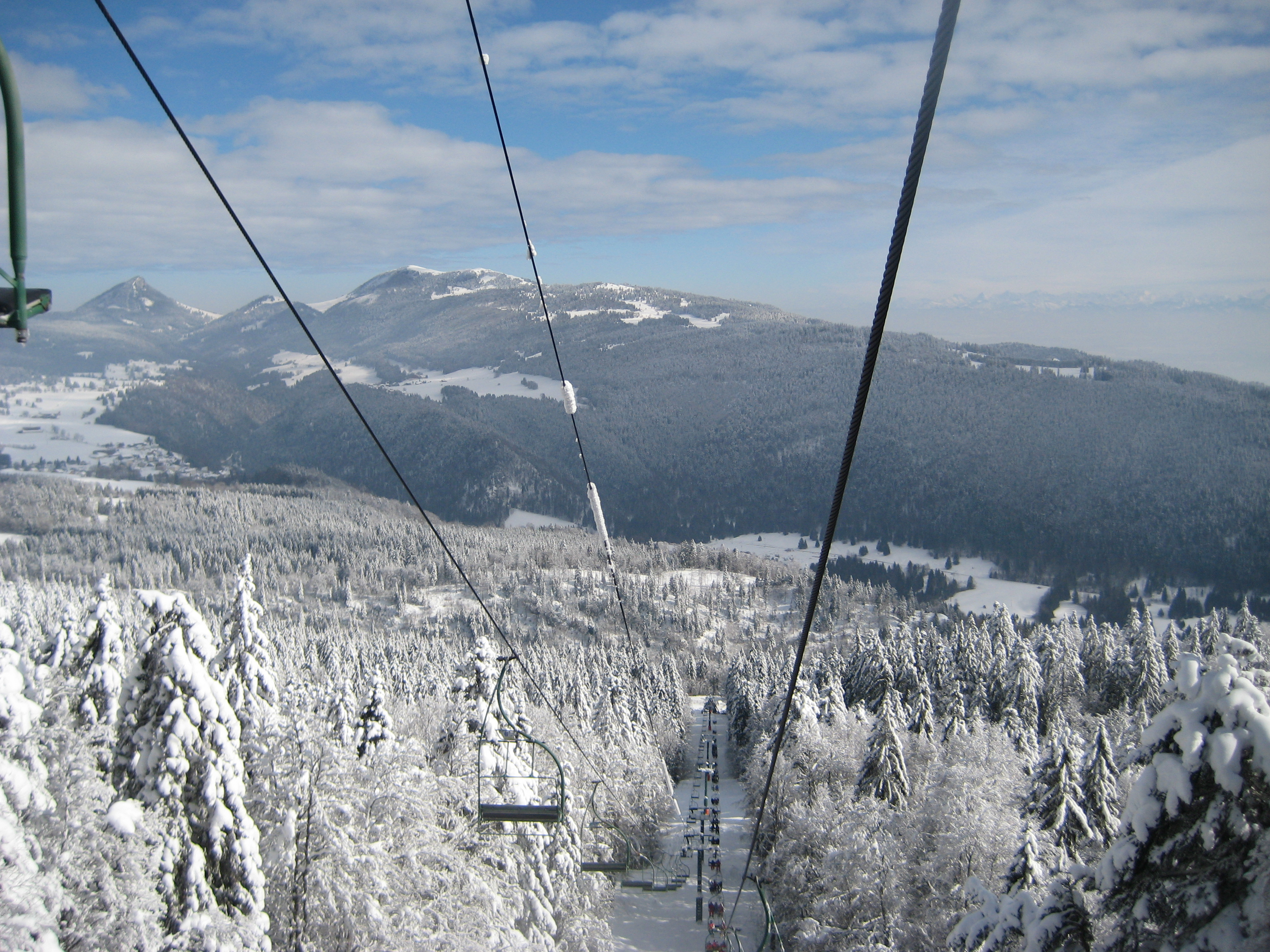
Scenic chairlift rising above a snowy mountain landscape in France

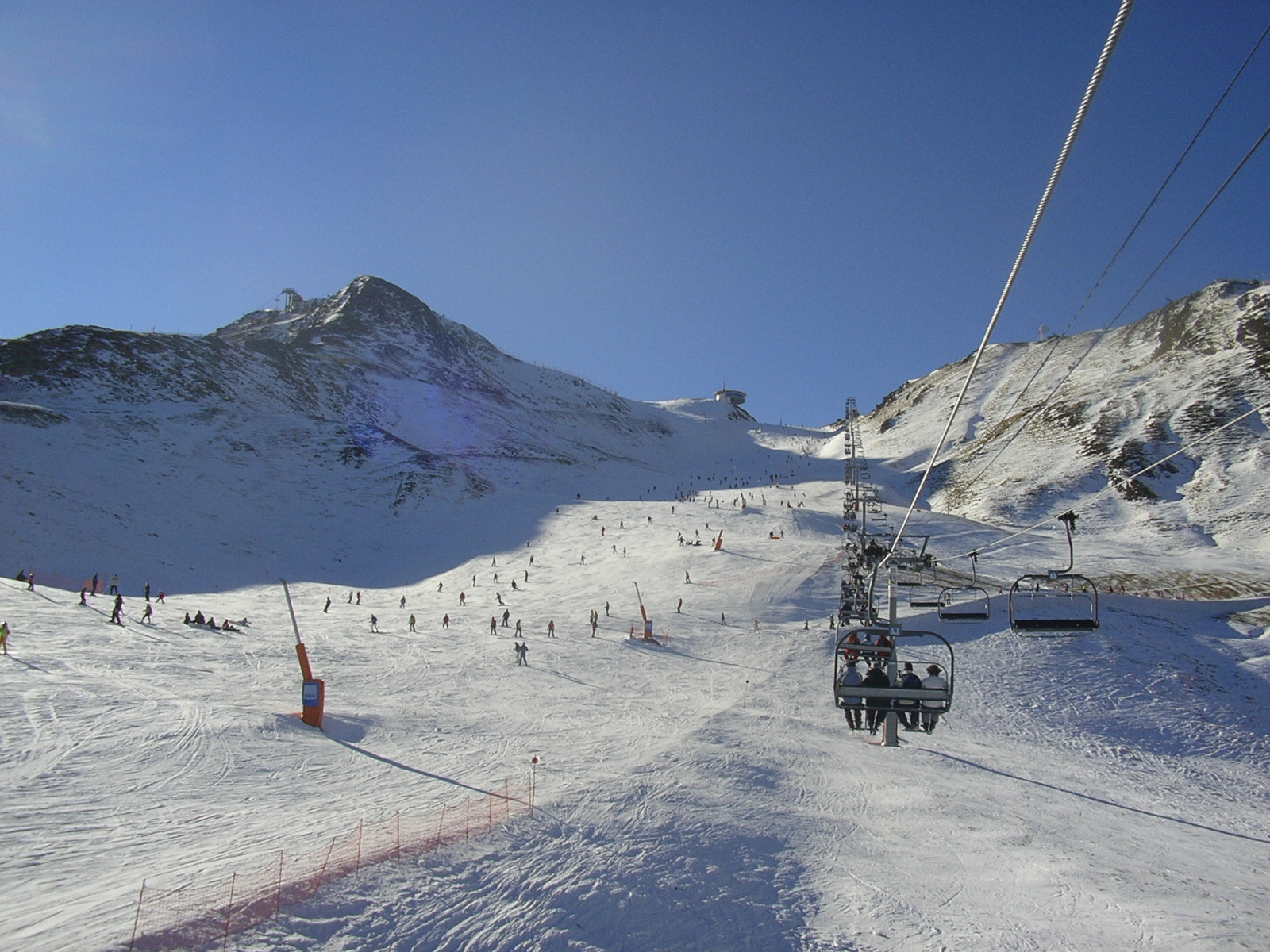
El Pas de la Casa, Andorra. Grandvalira is the largest ski resort in the Pyrenees.

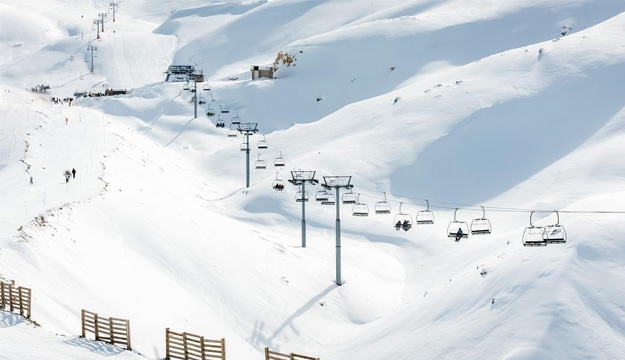
Mzaar Kfardebian Ski Resort in Lebanon

The ski industry has identified advancing generations of ski resorts:

First generation
Developed around a well-established summer resort or village (e.g. Davos, St. Moritz, Kitzbühel, Chamonix, Cortina d'Ampezzo, Megève, Val Gardena).
Second generation
Created from a non-tourist village or pasture (e.g. St Anton am Arlberg, Lech, Courchevel, L'Alpe d'Huez, Aspen/Snowmass, Breckenridge Ski Resort).
Third generation or integrated
Designed from scratch on virgin territory to be a purpose-built ski resort, all the amenities and services nearby (e.g. Sestriere, Flaine, La Plagne, Isola 2000).
Fourth generation or village resorts
Created from a virgin territory or around an existing village, but more concerned with traditional uses (e.g. Valmeinier, Valmorel, Shahdag Mountain Resort).

The term ski station is also used, particularly in Europe, for a skiing facility which is not located in or near a town or village. A ski resort which is also open for summer activities is often referred to as a mountain resort.

== Facilities and amenities ==
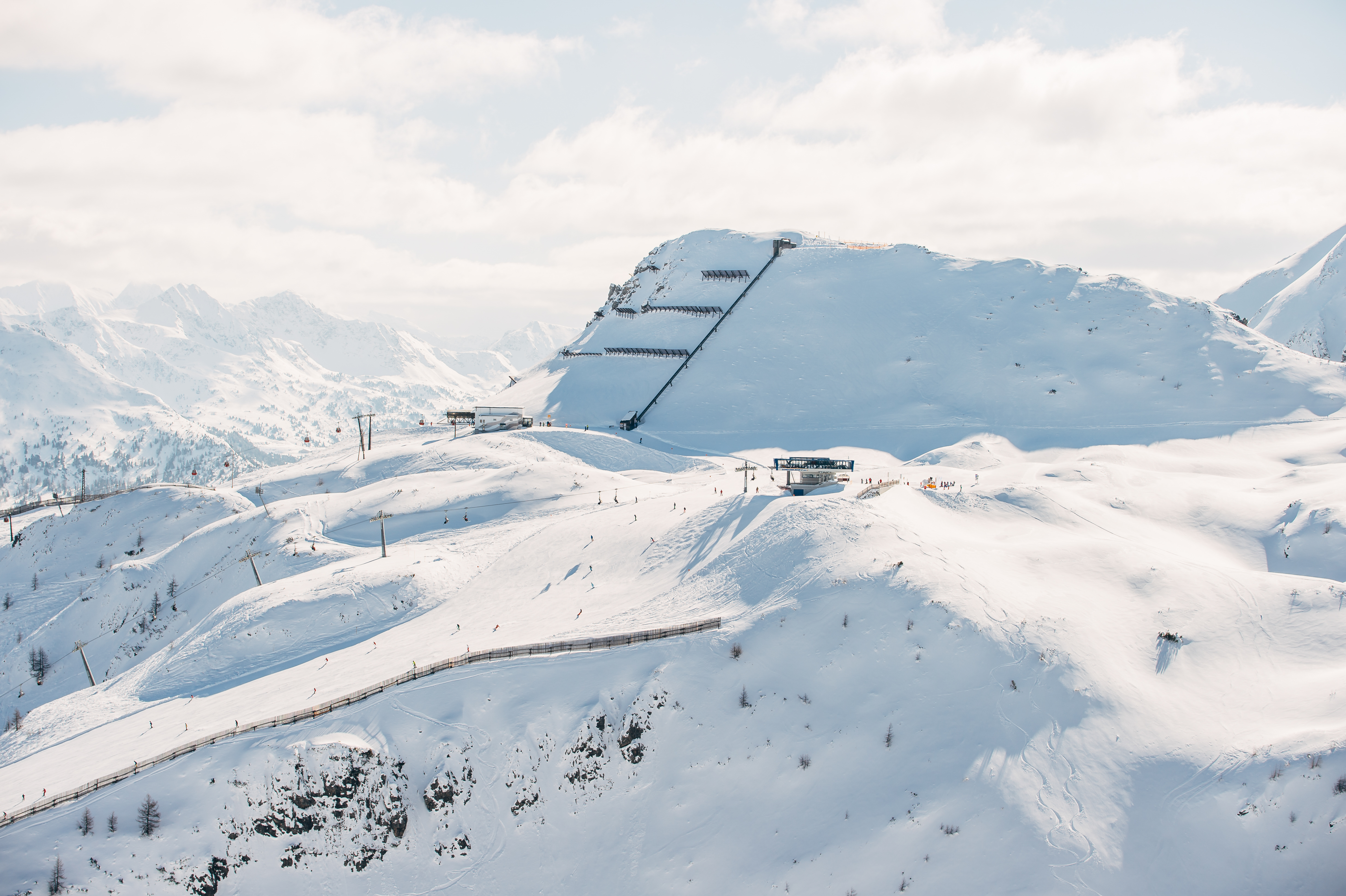
This image of Zauchensee, Austria, shows the pistes, served by a gondola lift, detachable chairlift and a funicular. There is a snow fence to prevent snowdrift; and avalanche towers and avalanche barriers to mitigate the risk of avalanches.

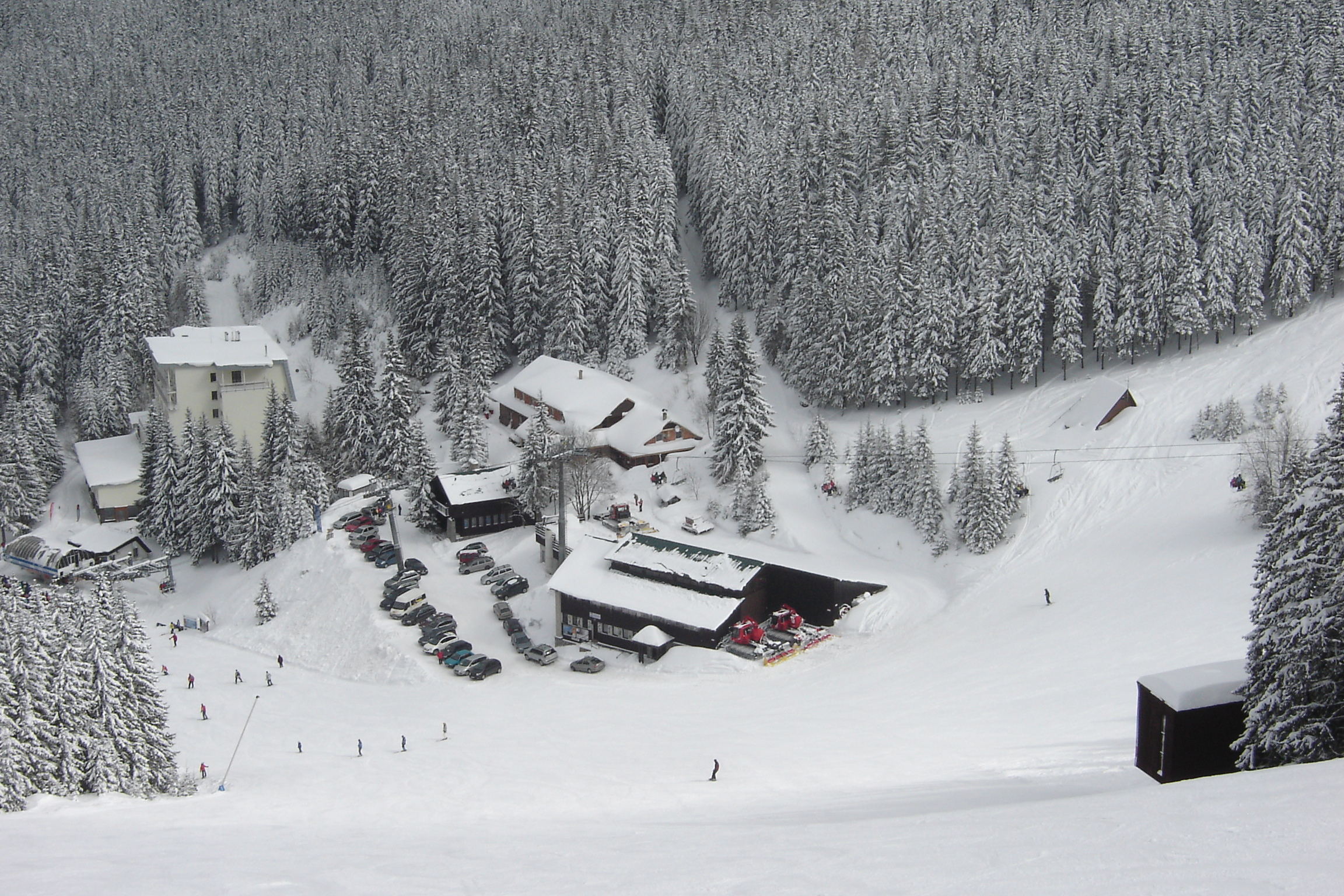
Jasná ski resort in Slovakia

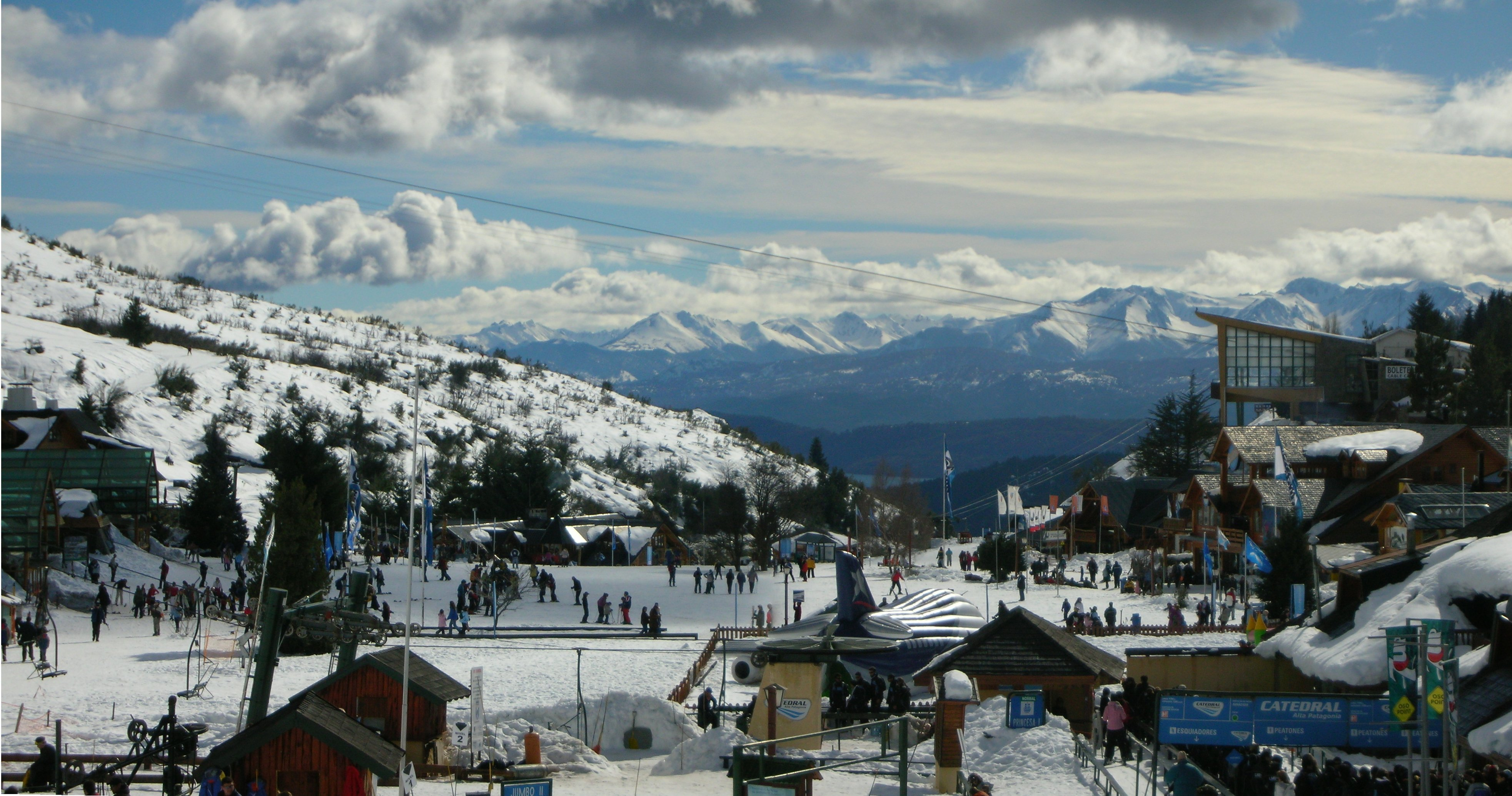
Cerro Catedral Ski Resort, Argentina

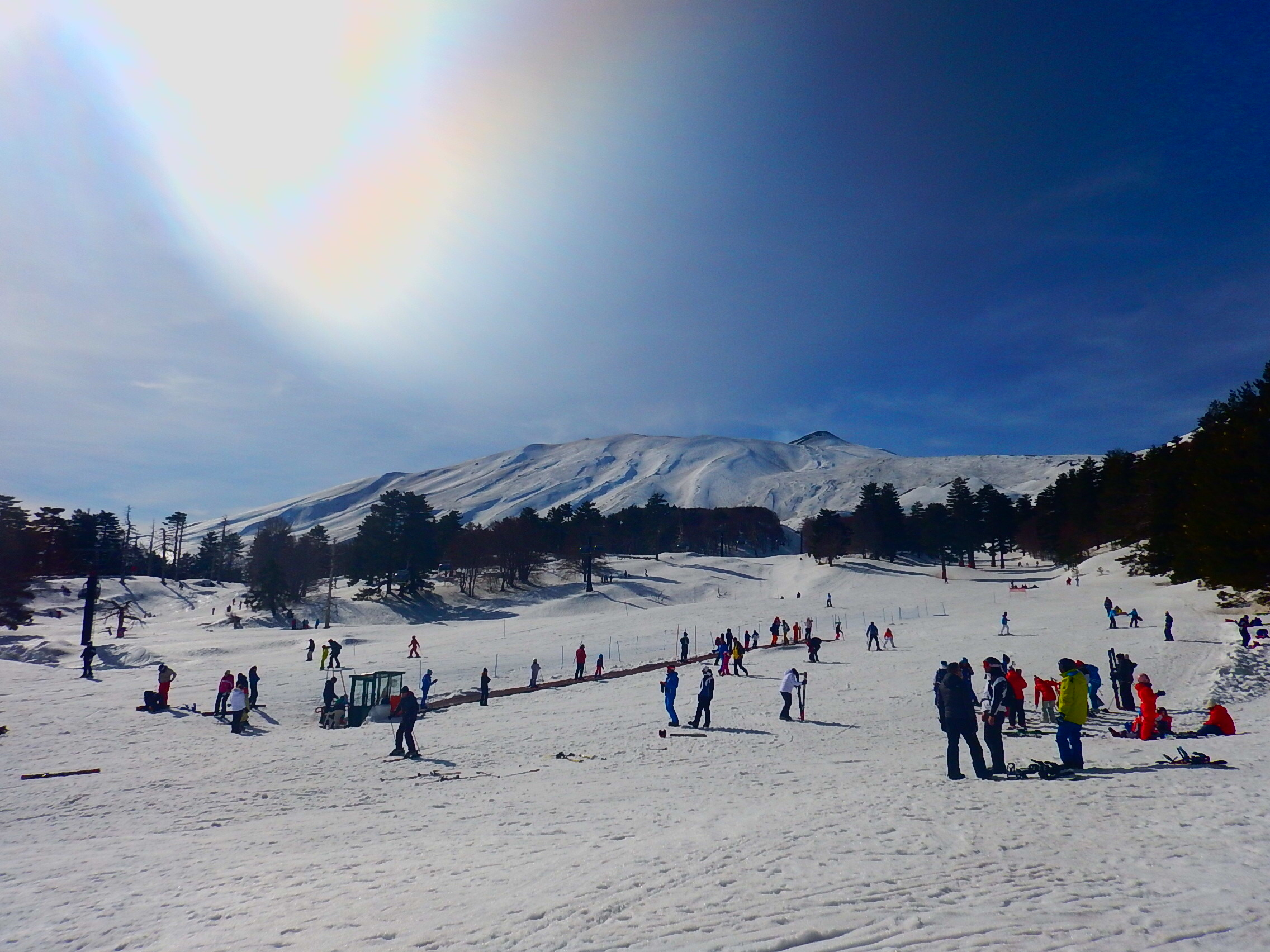
Ski resorts can also be situated on a volcano like this one on Etna in Sicily.

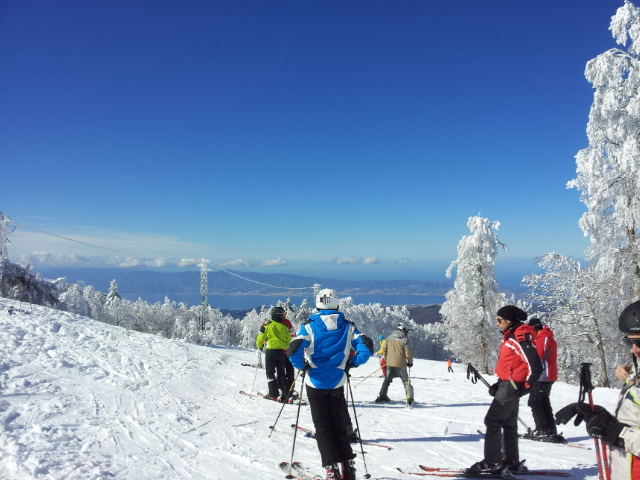
Gambarie, a ski resort above the Strait of Messina

Ski areas have marked paths for skiing known as runs, trails or pistes. Ski areas typically have one or more chairlifts for moving skiers rapidly to the top of hills, and to interconnect the various trails. Rope tows can also be used on short slopes (usually beginner hills or bunny slopes). Larger ski areas may use gondola lifts or aerial tramways for transportation across longer distances within the ski area. Resorts post their trail map illustrating the location of lifts, trails, services and the ski area boundary, and during the ski season issue a daily snow conditions report listing open trails, operating lifts and weather status.

Ski areas usually have at least a basic first aid facility, and some kind of ski patrol service to ensure that injured skiers are rescued. The ski patrol is usually responsible for rule enforcement, marking hazards, closing individual runs or areas as conditions require, and removing (dismissing) dangerous participants from the area.

The typical ski area base includes a ticket office, ski lodge, ski school, equipment rental/repair shop, restaurant/bar, shopping, shuttle bus stop and parking.

Some ski resorts offer lodging options on the slopes themselves, with ski-in and ski-out access allowing guests to ski right up to the door. Ski resorts often have other activities, such as snowmobiling, sledding, horse drawn sleighs, dog-sledding, ice skating, indoor or outdoor swimming and hot tubbing, game rooms, and local forms of entertainment, such as clubs, cinema, theaters and cabarets.

Après-ski (French for after skiing) is a term for entertainment, nightlife or social events that occur specifically at ski resorts. These add to the enjoyment of resort-goers and provide something to do besides skiing and snowboarding. The culture originated in the Alps, where it is most popular and where skiers often stop at bars on their last run of the day while still wearing all their ski gear. Though the word "ski" is a derivation of the Old Norse skíð via Norwegian, the choice of French is likely attributed to the early popularity of such activities in the French Alps, with which it was then linked.

== Environmental effects ==
As rising temperatures, receding glaciers and declining snowfall affect the environment, resort development and operations also have an environmental impact on land, lakes, streams, and wildlife. Amenities and infrastructure such as concrete buildings, ski lifts, access roads, parking lots, and railways have contributed to the urbanization of mountainous zones.

=== Primary (direct) impact of resort development ===
In recent years, the use of snow cannons by many ski resorts has increased to compensate for reduced levels of snowfall. In order to sustain good quality snow coverage, snowmaking requires large amounts of water and sometimes the creation of artificial lakes. Snow cannons also introduce a noise element.

=== Secondary (indirect) impact of resort development ===
The required infrastructure can affect erosion through the increased area of impervious surfaces, redirecting the flow of water runoff.

=== Mitigation efforts ===
Many resorts are taking steps to reduce their energy and water consumption and waste production, increase recycling, and restore habitats. Initiatives aimed at addressing environmental concerns include:

- Alpine Convention
- Snowsports Industries America (SIA) ClimateUnited
- NSAA Sustainable Slopes Initiative
- National Forest Foundation Ski Conservation Fund
- Ceres Business for Innovative Climate and Energy Policy (BICEP) Network
- FESI Winter Sports Sustainability Network (WSN)
- Protect Our Winters (POW)

== Gallery ==
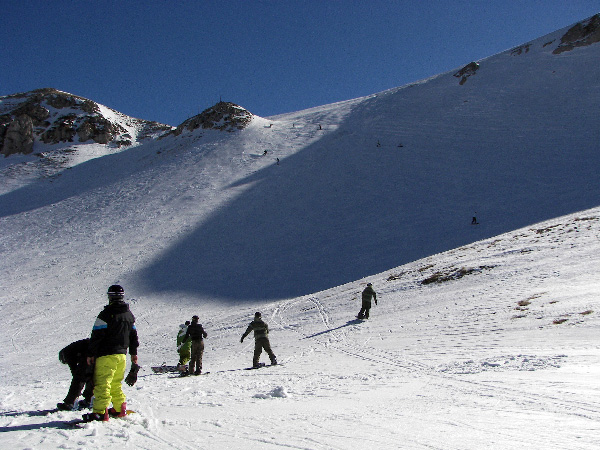
Roccaraso, Italy

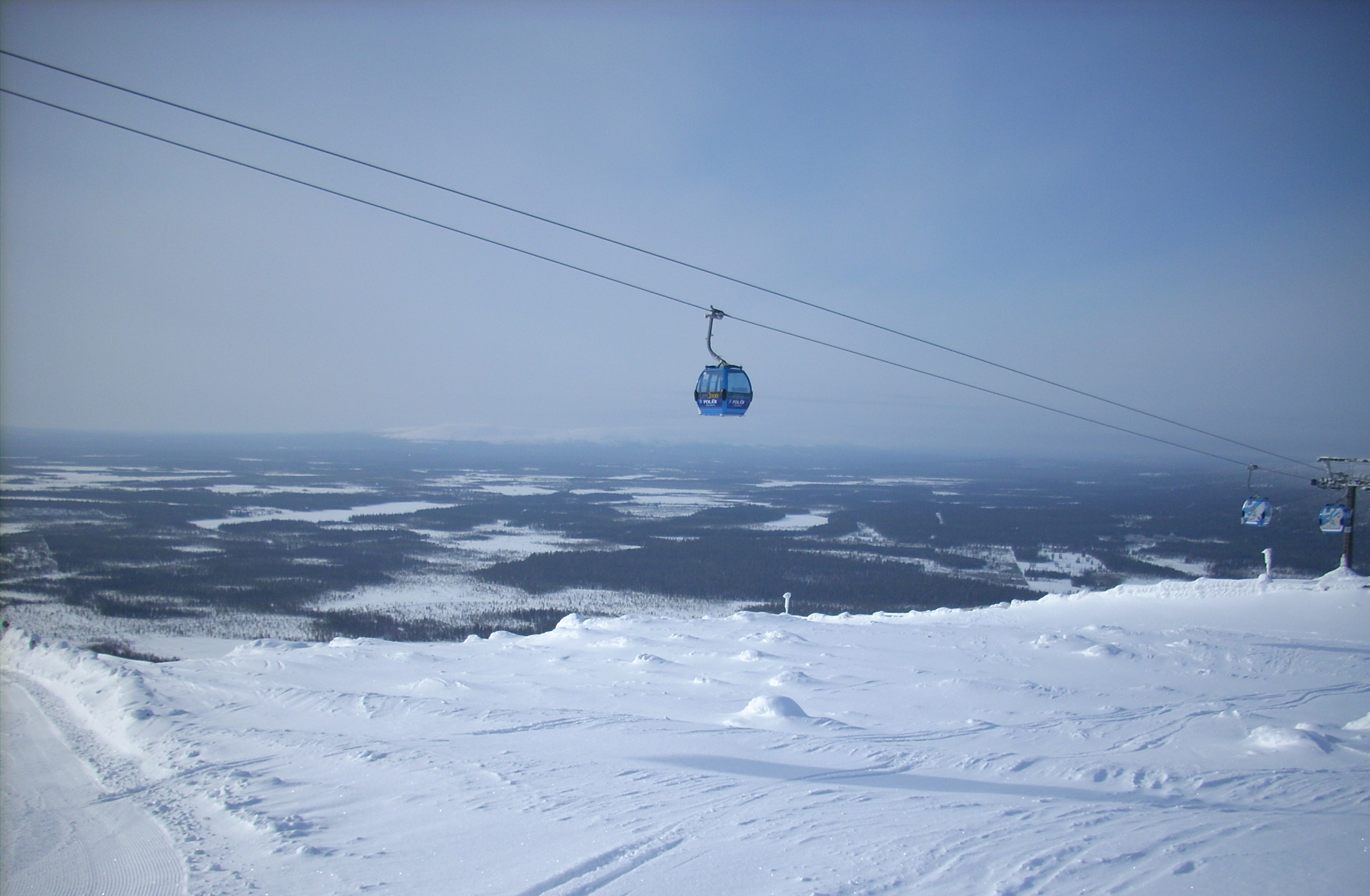
Levi, Finland

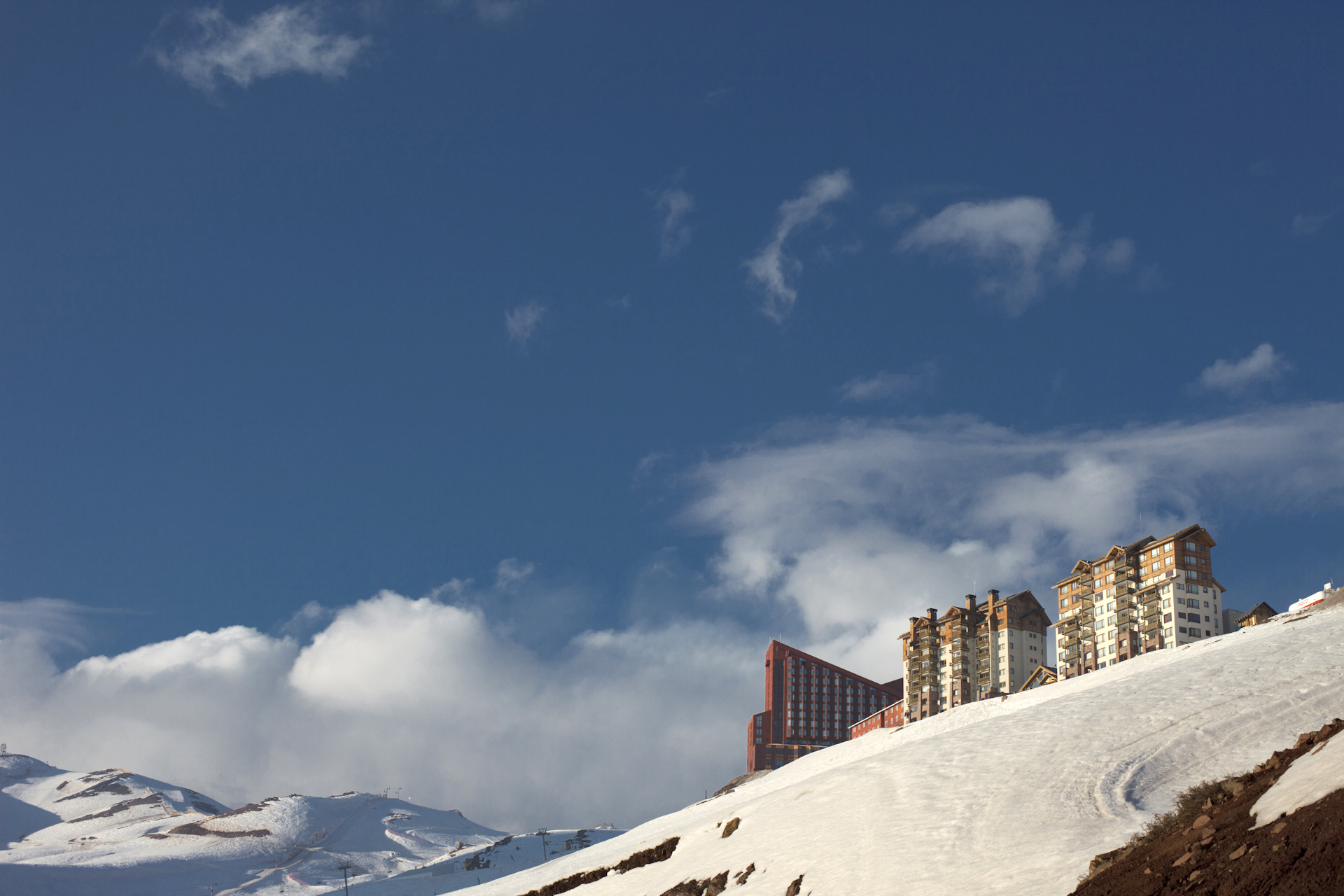
Valle Nevado, Chile

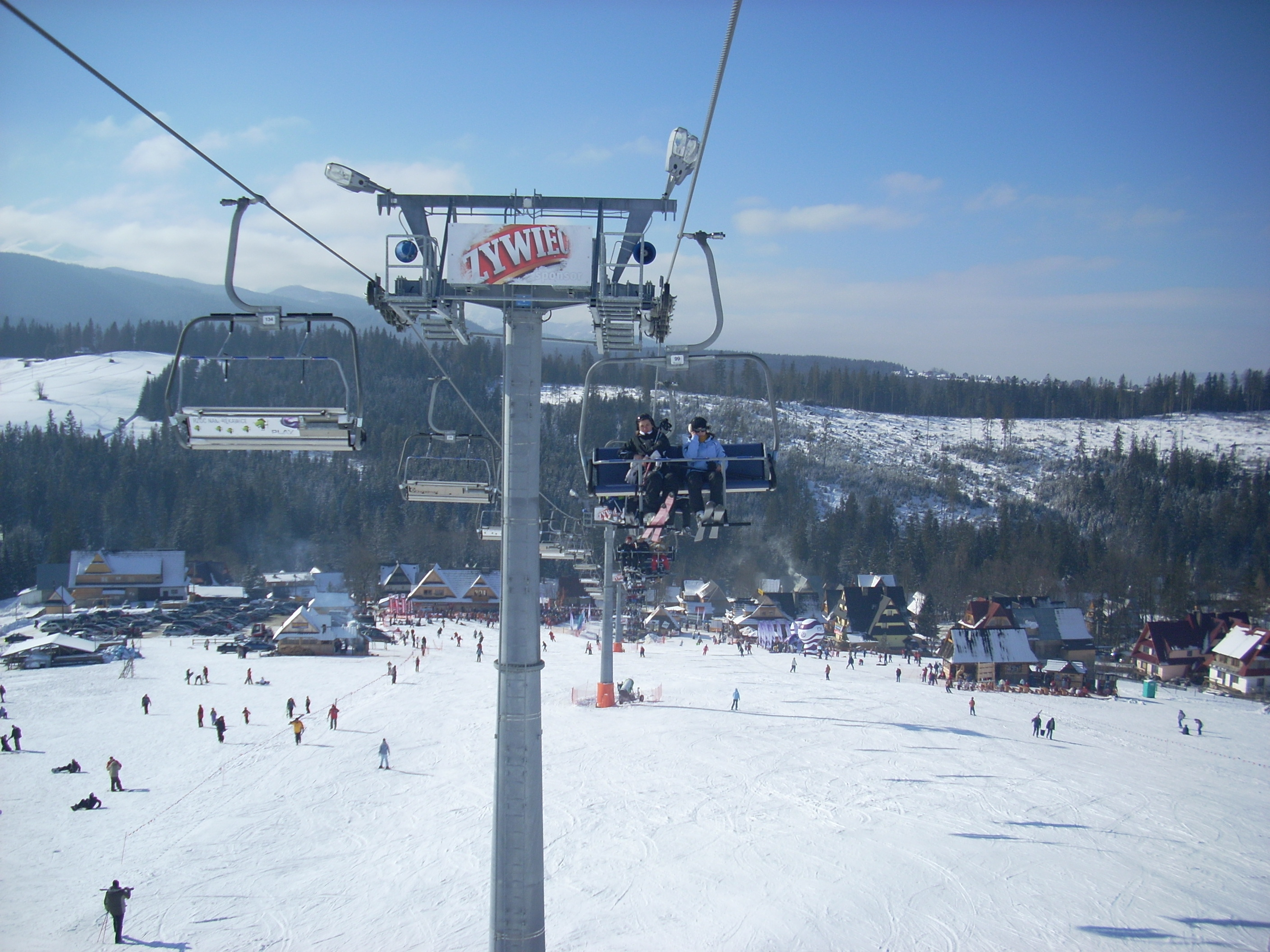
Małe Ciche, Poland

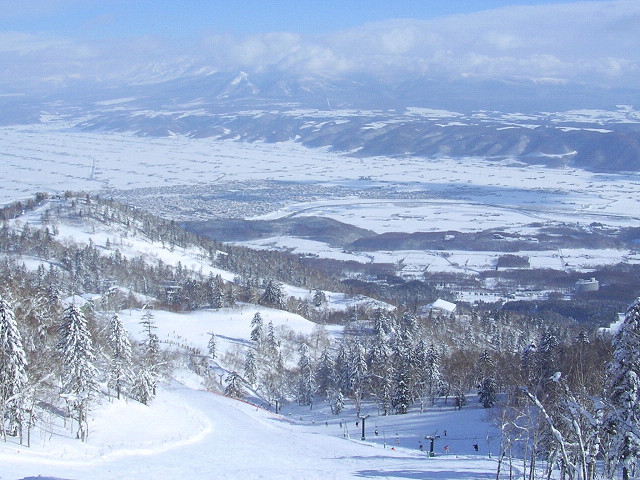
Furano Ski Resort, Japan

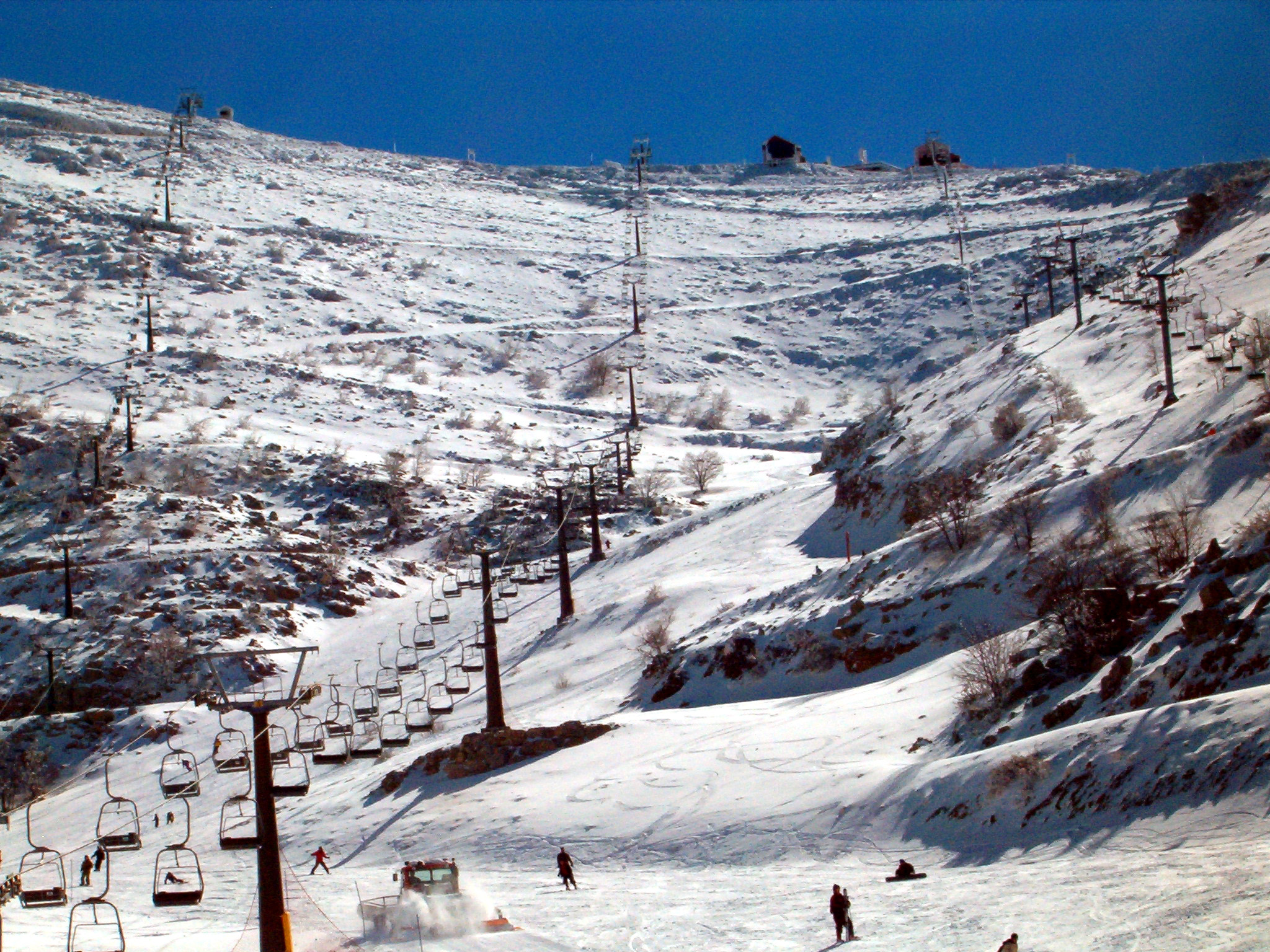
Mount Hermon Ski Resort, Golan Heights

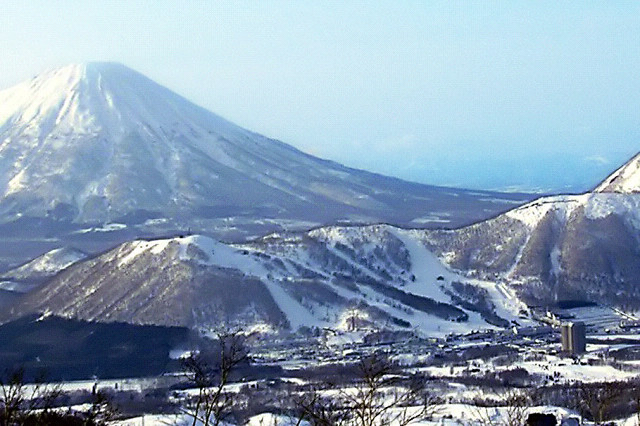
Rusutsu Resort, Japan

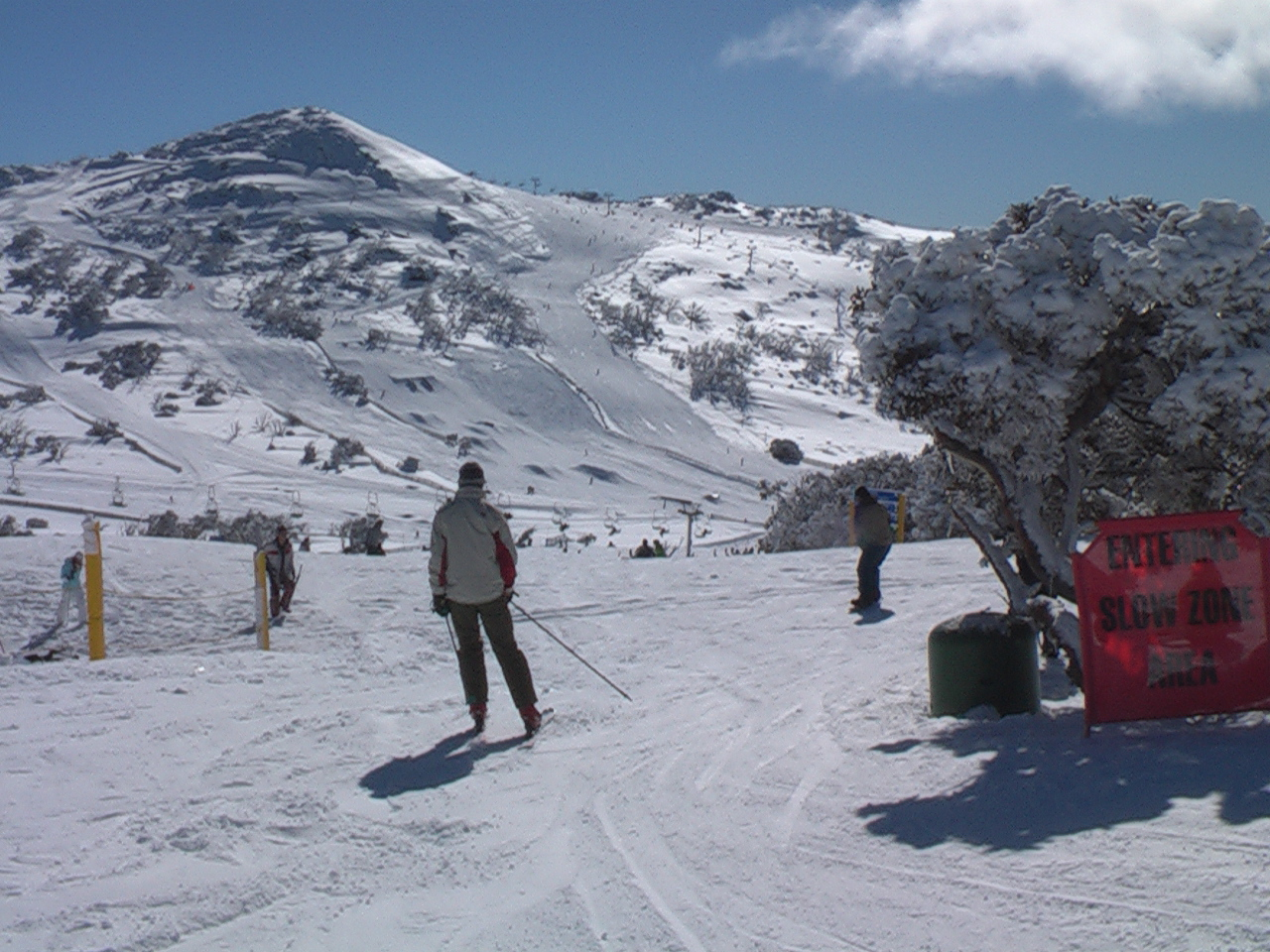
Perisher Ski Resort, Australia

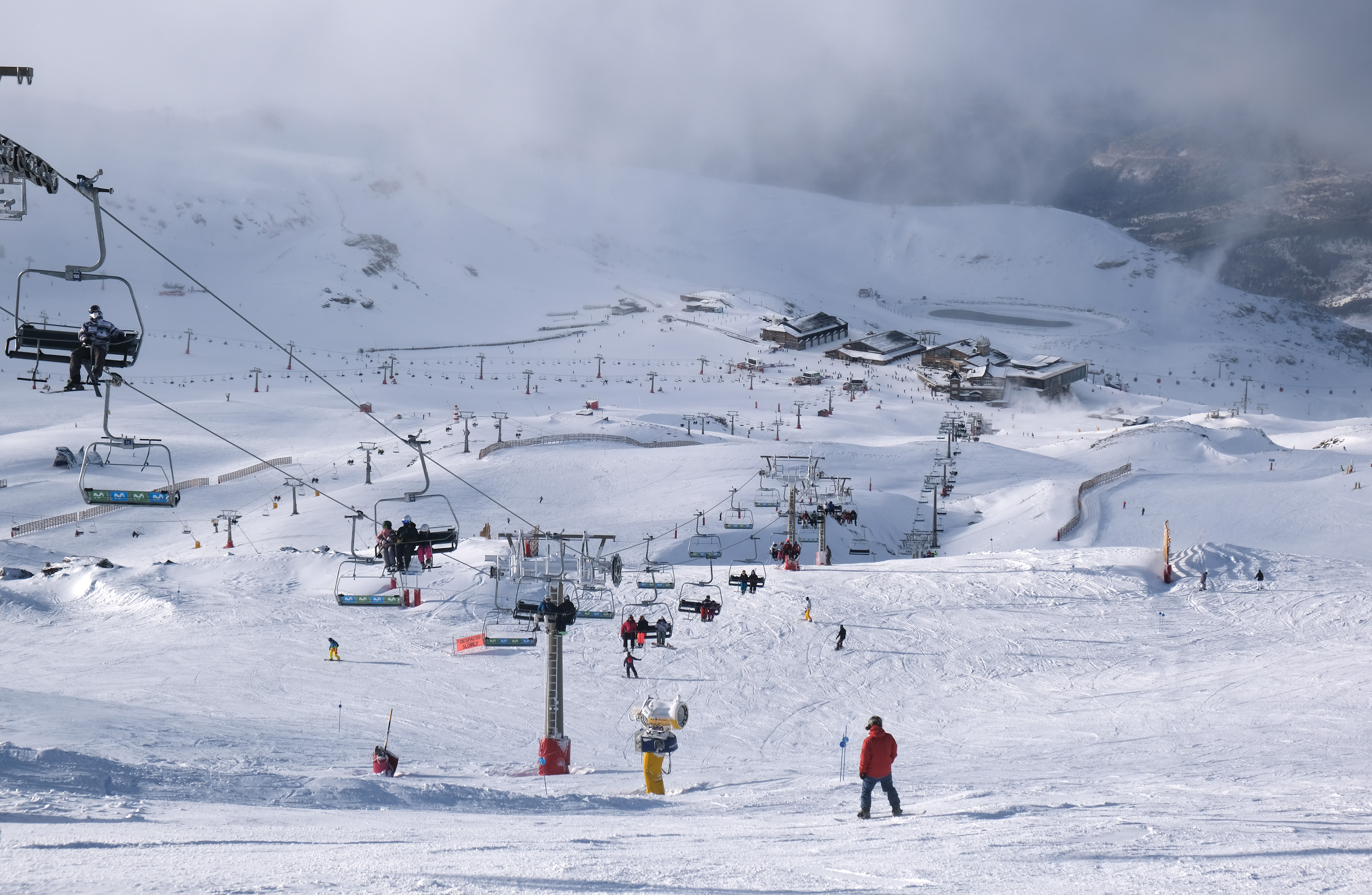
Sierra Nevada Ski Station, Spain

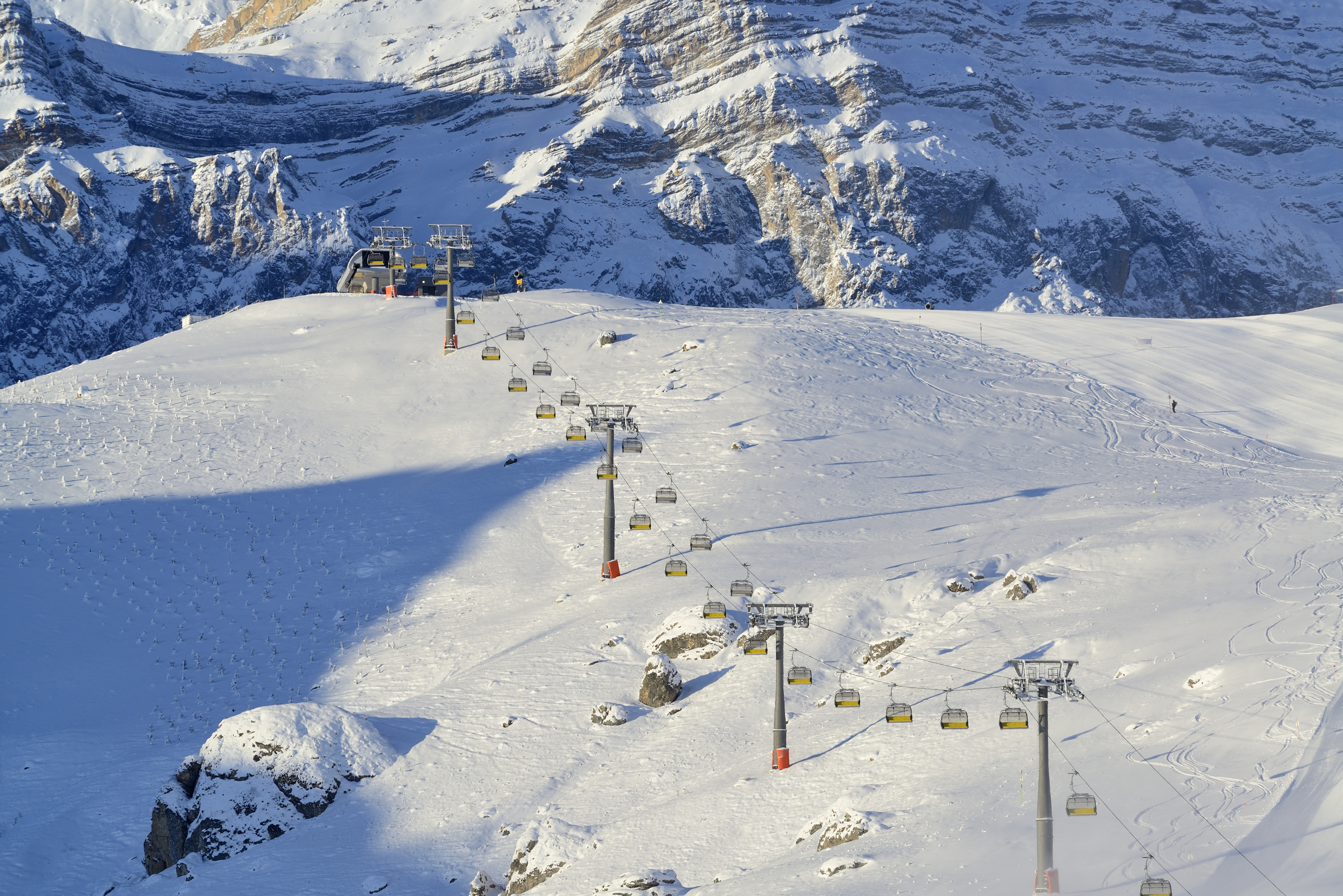
Shahdag Mountain Resort, Azerbaijan

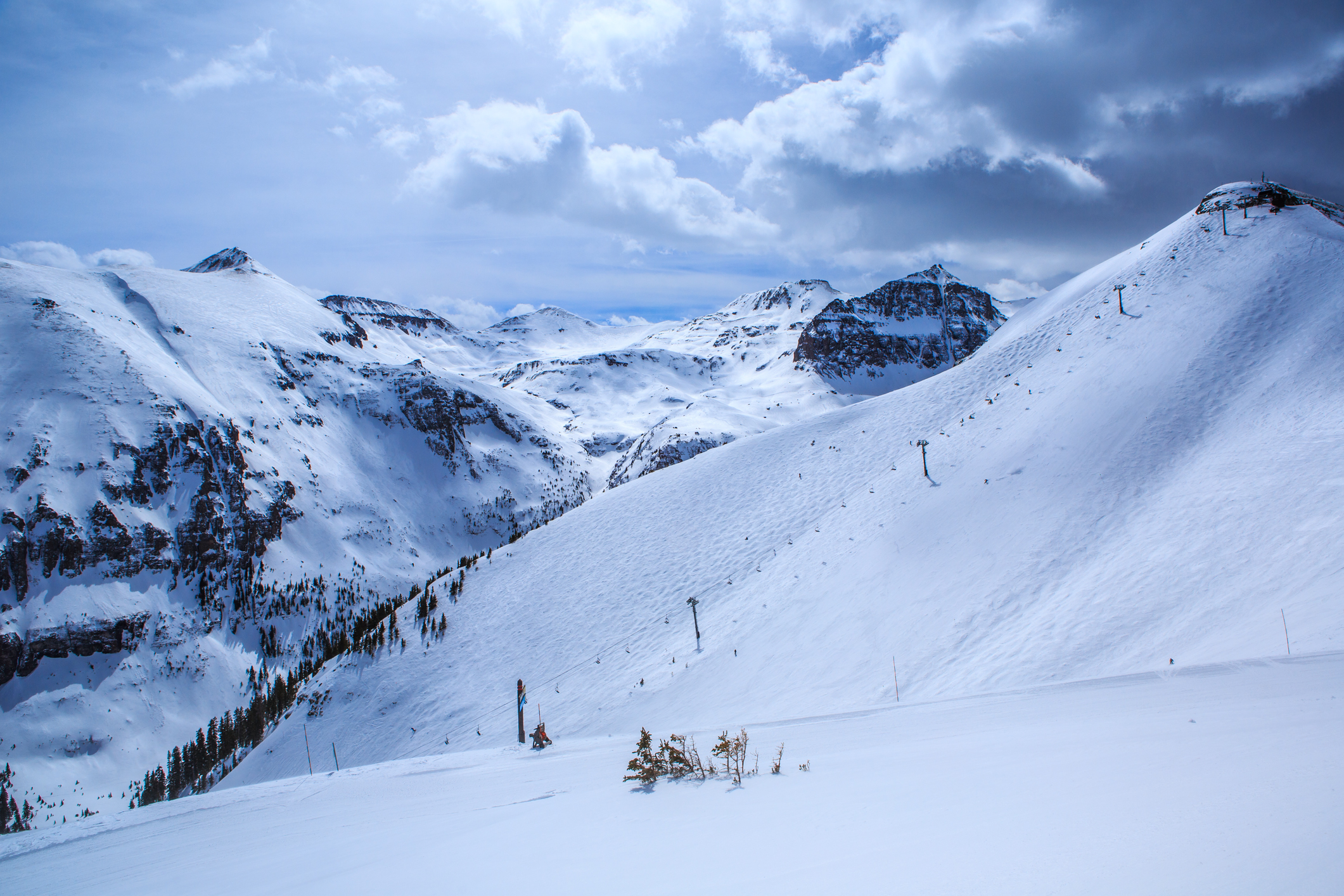
Telluride Ski Resort, United States

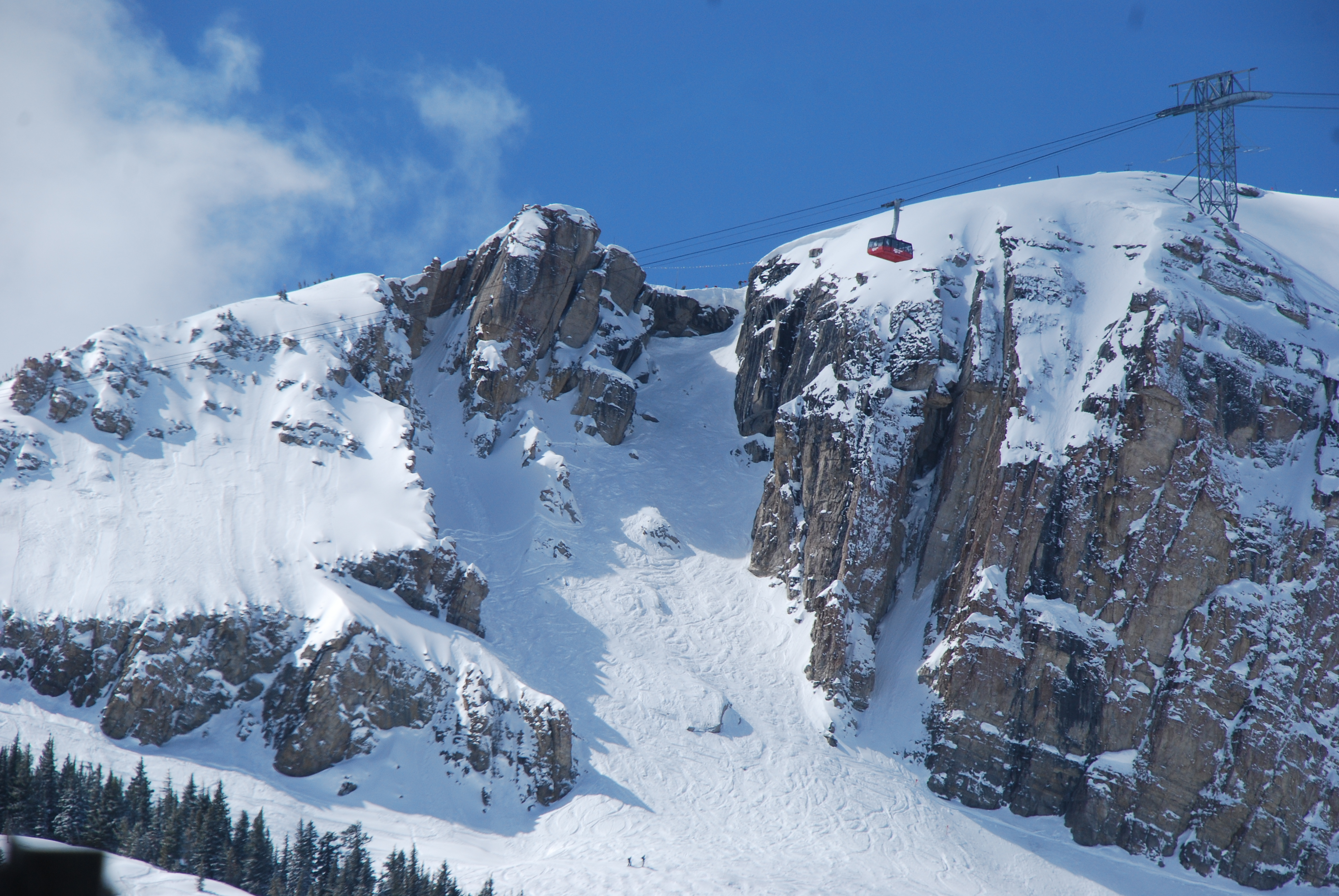
Jackson Hole Mountain Resort, United States

== See also ==
- List of ski areas and resorts
