= Arteaga Municipality, Coahuila =

Municipality in the Mexican state of Coahuila

Arteaga
- Municipality
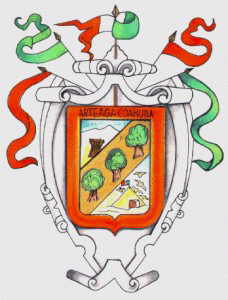
- Coat of arms

- Municipality of Arteaga in Coahuila

- Location in Mexico
- Coordinates: 25°25′28″N 101°50′24″W
- Country: Mexico
- State: Coahuila
- Municipal seat: Arteaga

Area
  - Total: 1,818.6 km^{2} (702.2 sq mi)

Population (2005)
  - Total: 19,622

Arteaga is one of the 38 municipalities of Coahuila, in north-eastern Mexico. The municipal seat lies at Arteaga. The municipality covers an area of 1818.6 km^{2}.

As of 2005, the municipality had a total population of 19,622.
