= Mangelwurzel =

Cultivated root vegetable

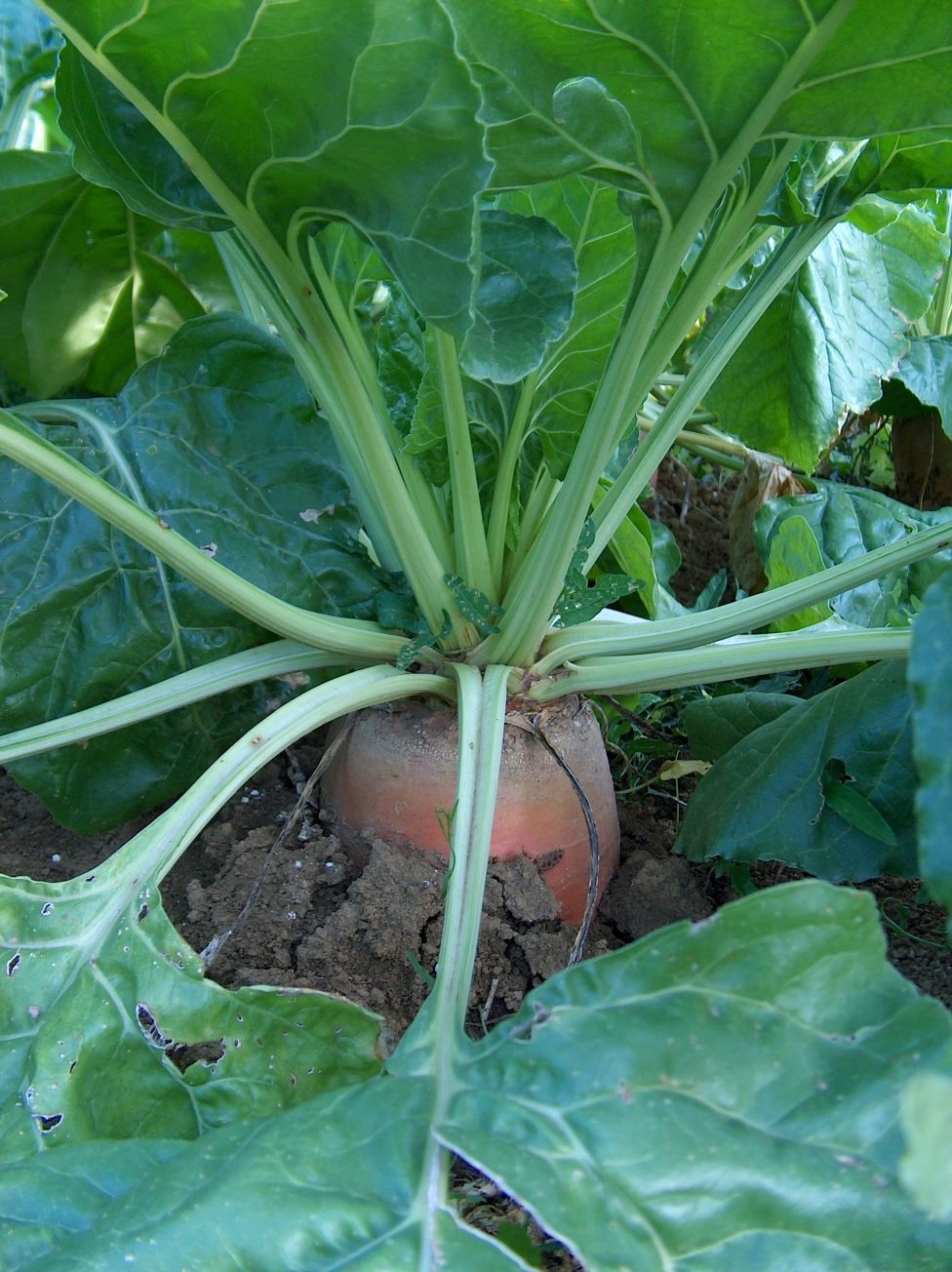
- Mangelwurzel
- Species: Beta vulgaris
- Subspecies: Beta vulgaris subsp. vulgaris
- Cultivar group: Crassa Group
- Origin: Sea beet (Beta vulgaris subsp. maritima)

Mangelwurzel or mangold wurzel (from German Mangel/Mangold, "chard" and Wurzel, "root"), also called mangold, mangel beet, field beet, fodder beet and (archaic) root of scarcity, is a cultivated root vegetable. It is a variety of Beta vulgaris, the same species that also contains the red beet (beetroot) and sugar beet varieties. The cultivar group is named Crassa Group. Their large white, yellow or orange-yellow swollen roots were developed in the 18th century as a fodder crop for feeding livestock.

== Uses ==
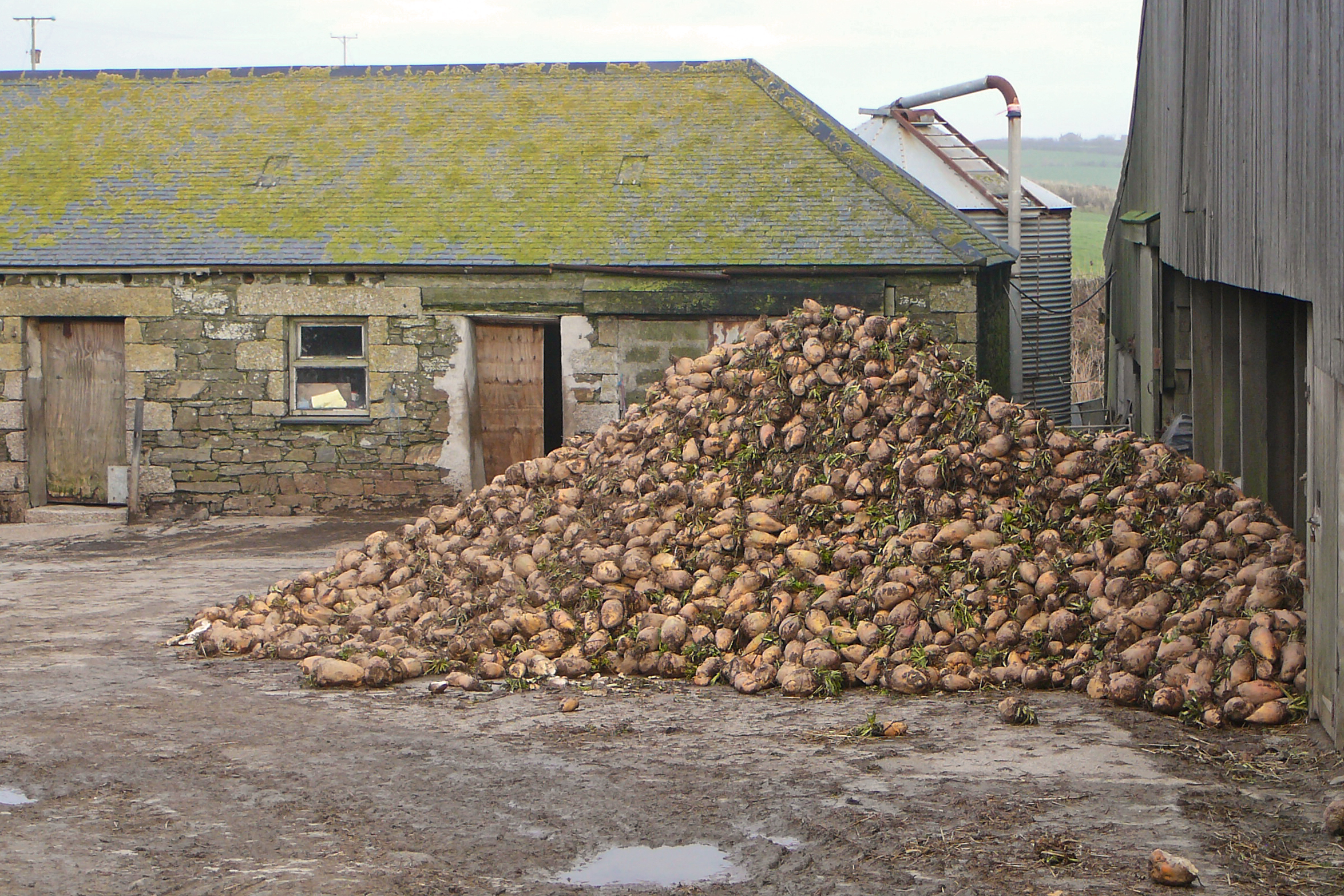
Harvested mangelwurzels in Cornwall, England, circa 2009.

Contemporary use is primarily for cattle, pig and other stock fodder, although it can be eaten—especially when young—by humans. Considered a crop for cool-temperate climates, the mangelwurzel sown in autumn can be grown as a winter crop in warm-temperate to subtropical climates. Both leaves and roots may be eaten. Leaves can be lightly steamed for salads or lightly boiled as a vegetable if treated like spinach or chard, which is a member of the same subspecies. Grown in well-dug, well-composted soil and watered regularly, the roots become tender, juicy, and flavourful. The roots are prepared boiled like potato for serving mashed, diced, or in sweet curries. Animals are known to thrive upon this plant; both its leaves and roots provide nutritious food. George Henderson, a 20th-century English farmer and author on agriculture, described mangel beets as one of the best fodders for dairying, as milk production is maximized.

The mangelwurzel has a history in England of being used for sport ("mangold hurling"), for celebration, for animal fodder, and for the brewing of a potent alcoholic beverage. The 1830 Scottish cookbook The Practice of Cookery includes a recipe for a beer made with mangelwurzel. In 19th-century American usage, mangel beets were sometimes referred to as "mango".

During the Irish Famine (1845–1852), Poor Law Guardians in Galway City leased (on a 999-year-lease) an eight-hectare (twenty-acre) former nunnery to house 1,000 orphaned or deserted boys ages from five to about 15. Here, the boys were taught tailoring, shoe making, and agricultural skills. On a two-hectare (five-acre) plot, they grew potatoes, cabbage, parsnips, carrots, onions, Swedish turnips, and "mangold wurtzel", both for workhouse consumption and for a cash crop.

Mangelwurzels are used as winter food for dairy cows, especially in New Zealand. Veterinarians used to believe that the plant contains too much oxalate for cattle to eat, but farmers found that very high amounts of grazed mangelwurzel killed only a very small portion of cows, with the rest thriving. It is now known that these deaths were due to rumen acidosis and had nothing to do with oxalate. Safer protocols to transition cows onto mangelwurzel feed were then provided, making the entire process quite safe.

As with most foods, subsisting on solely one crop can produce dietary deficiency. The food shortages in Europe after World War I caused great hardships, including cases of mangel-wurzel disease, as relief workers called it. It was a consequence of eating only beets.

== Growing requirements ==
In general, mangelwurzel are easy to grow. They may require supplementary potassium for optimum yields, flavour, and texture, and foliage readily displays potassium deficiency as interveinal chlorosis. This can be corrected with either organic or inorganic sources of potash.

Mangelwurzel is very susceptible to damage from frost. It is suited to southern parts of England where the climate is too warm and dry for the successful cultivation of turnip.

== In popular culture ==
In South Somerset, on the last Thursday of October every year, Punkie Night is celebrated. Children carry around lanterns called "punkies", made from hollowed-out mangelwurzels. Mangelwurzels also are, or previously were, carved out for Halloween in Norfolk, Wales, parts of Yorkshire and northwest Cumberland (Workington) and Devon.

Mangelwurzel seeds were sent by Benjamin Rush to George Washington.

Worzel Gummidge, the protagonist in a series of children's books and television adaptations, is a scarecrow whose head is made from a mangelwurzel.

It is mentioned in a line of “Beasts of England” - the fictional anthem of George Orwell’s Animal Farm (1945)

"Clover, beans, and mangel-wurzels shall be ours upon that day”

== See also ==
- Beet
- Rutabaga
- Turnip
- Chard
- The Wurzels, a British band
