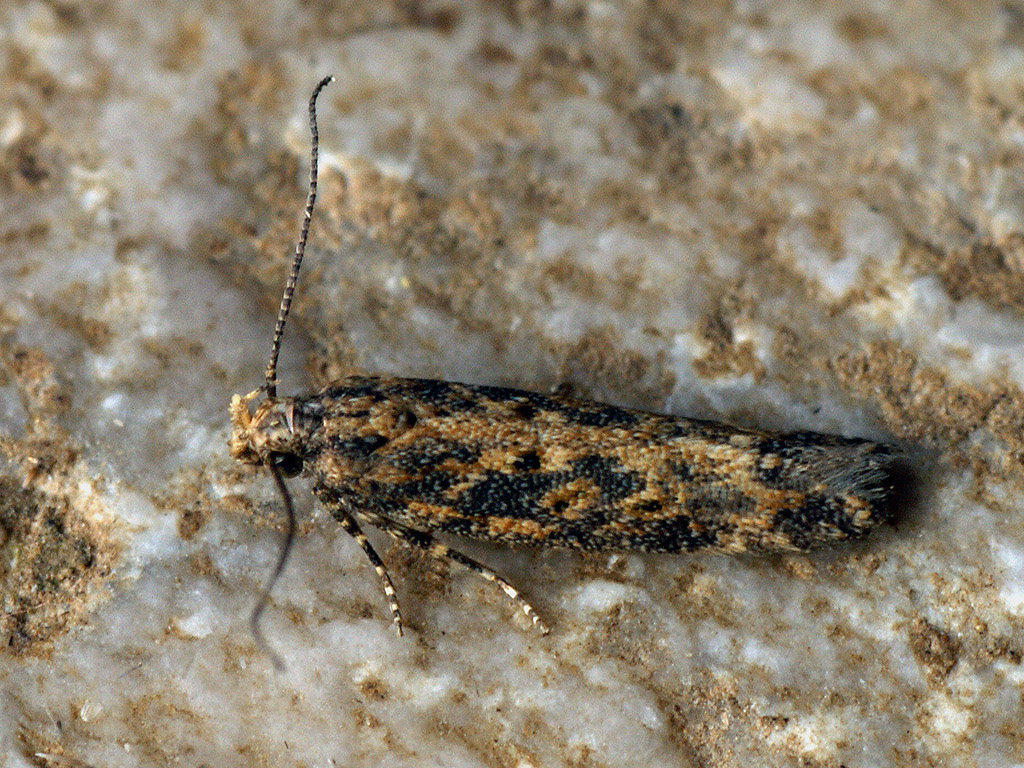

Scientific classification
- Kingdom: Animalia
- Phylum: Arthropoda
- Class: Insecta
- Order: Lepidoptera
- Family: Gelechiidae
- Genus: Scrobipalpa
- Species: S. ocellatella

Binomial name
- Scrobipalpa ocellatella (Boyd, 1858)

Synonyms
- Gelechia ocellatella Stainton, 1859; Gelechia submissella Stainton, 1859; Gelechia horticolella Rössler, 1866; Lita atriplicella var. clarella Caradja, 1920; Lita ocellatella obscurior Rebel, 1926; Gnorimoschema ocellatellum orientale Gregor & Povolný, 1954

= Scrobipalpa ocellatella =

Species of moth

Scrobipalpa ocellatella, the beet moth, is a moth in the family Gelechiidae. It was described by Boyd in 1858. It is found on Madeira and the Canary Islands, and in North Africa, most of Europe, the Middle East, Iran, from the southern part of European Russia to the Caucasus, as well as in Ukraine, Moldova, Georgia and Turkmenistan.

The wingspan is 12–14 mm (0.47–0.55 in). Head rosy-whitish, crown sometimes greyish. Terminal joint of palpi shorter than second. Forewings ochreous, sometimes greyish-tinged or rosy suffused, suffusedly irrorated with blackish -grey on disc, four costal patches, and an apical patch; stigmata black, sometimes ringed with pale, first discal beyond plical; an ill-defined nearly straight pale fascia at 3/4; black terminal dots. Larva pale yellowish - green; each segment with a transverse series of irregular crimson blotches; dots blackish; head pale brown.

The larvae feed on Beta maritima and Beta vulgaris. Young larvae bore in the midrib. Later, they mine the leaf from a web spun over of the leaf. The larvae have a grey green body with vague reddish-brown length lines and a light brown head. During the winter, the caterpillars that are in the leaf-tops usually die. Those that were in the heads of root crops, which remain in the field, survive.

The output of moths from pupae that have wintered, and at the same time pupation of caterpillars of V age, coincides with the appearance of sprouts of sugar beet. The moths do not need additional nutrition, however, during drier periods, dew drops are sucked out. They are active in the evening, night and morning hours. The life expectancy of moths is 12–18 days. Females lay two to three eggs on the underside of the leaves, the aerial part of the root crops, plant remains and lumps of soil. Fertility is 100-150 eggs.

The caterpillars born after 5–8 days first scrape the parenchyma, then braid the central leaves with cobwebs and eat through holes along the middle vein of the leaf and groove on the petioles. On adult beet plants they are under the swirling edges of the leaves and inside the cuttings or in the passages inside the head of the root crop. Damage is noted throughout the season, beginning with the appearance of two to three pairs of real leaves before harvesting. Caterpillars pass through five ages during the 25–30 days of development. They are hygrophilic, therefore, in a dry and hot weather, their mass death is observed. After completing nutrition they pupate in oval spider cocoons in the soil at a depth of 2–5 cm (0.79–1.97 in).

In the case of significant damage to plants, the growth of new leaves stops. Instead of a central beam, a black, loose lump of spiderweaved leaves is formed. Damage to the beet roots is particularly dangerous, as they become unsuitable for winter storage.

The caterpillars damage flower-bearing shoots, which leads to their curving and drying. As a result, additional sprouts appear that give small and inferior seeds. The danger increases in the second half of summer due to the increase in pest numbers in the second and subsequent generations.

The number of beet miner moths reduces more than 50 species of predators and parasites. Caterpillars infect parasites from the family of Eulophidae.

Due to the fact that the damaged root crops rot quickly, timely harvesting and processing is necessary in fields where the moth causes significant damage. Economic threshold of damage: in the phenophase six to eight leaves with one caterpillar per two plants; at the beginning of the formation of root crops, 0.8-1 caterpillar per plant; at the beginning of the withering away of leaves, two caterpillars per plant.
