= Margarida Relvas =

Portuguese photographer (1867–1930)

Margarida Augusta de Azevedo Relvas Navarro
- Born: 19 February 1867; Golegã, Portugal
- Died: 1930 (aged 62–63)
- Known for: Photography
- Movement: Naturalist
- Spouse: Alberto de Campos Navarro

Margarida Augusta de Azevedo Relvas Navarro (1867–1930) was one of the first Portuguese women photographers. Unlike that of her photographer father, Carlos Relvas, her work had no political intention and tended to resemble watercolours.

== Early life ==
Born Margarida Augusta de Azevedo Relvas in Golegã, Portugal on 19 February 1867 (some sources say 1862), Relvas was the daughter of the well-known photographer, Carlos Relvas (1838-1894), and Margarida Amélia Mendes de Azevedo e Vasconcelos (1838-1887), daughter of the Count of Podentes. One of her brothers was José Relvas, a future prime minister of Portugal who was known as the person who proclaimed the First Portuguese Republic after the 5 October 1910 revolution, which overthrew the monarchy. As a young woman, she shared her father's love of photography, revealing both an artistic and technical mastery of the subject and became one of the first female photographers in Portugal.

== Photography ==
Her albumen prints, produced using the wet collodion process, were influenced by the Barbizon School, a group of French landscape painters, and she would often use photography as a way of retaining an image of a landscape so that she could paint it later. She paid considerable attention to light in her photographs. She received widespread praise for their technical perfection and framing. An English visitor to Portugal, James Waterhouse, reported that she had a small photographic studio connected to her father's house, which was "the private domain of Miss Relvas". He commented favourably on her still life photography. This observation is important because some observers have questioned whether she was really a photographer, suggesting that her father just used her name to increase his possibility of winning prizes in exhibitions. This seems unlikely given the differences in styles and subjects of the photographs attributed to the two.

Relvas received several awards for her work, notably at the annual photography competition in Ghent in 1880 and at the Union Centrale des Arts Décoratifs in Paris in 1882, where she won a diploma and a silver medal. She travelled and exhibited with her father at many other international exhibitions from the age of eleven. In 1881 she contributed a "series of paintings with photographic proofs" to an exhibition in Madrid and in 1883 she exhibited in Brussels, winning a bronze medal and a medal of honour. She contributed to the First International Exhibition of Photography in Porto in 1886, receiving favourable comments about her work.

In 1880 she contributed to the magazine Á Volta do Mundo – Jornal de Viagens e Assumptos (Around the World – Journal of Travel and Affairs], edited and published by Teófilo Braga and Abilio Eduardo da Costa Lobo, and in 1884 she submitted pictures of the Golegã landscape to Illustração Universal Portugueza, which published one on the front page of its first issue with the observation that "possessing, like her illustrious father Mr. Carlos Relvas, a remarkable artistic aptitude, this lady has exuberantly demonstrated how skilled she is in the difficult art of photographing splendid works, of which the specimens presented in this issue perfectly illustrate". A photograph of Vidago also appeared in the first issue of A Arte Photographica, published in Porto in 1884, together with flattering comments about her work, and one of her pictures was again published in the Illustração Universal Portugueza in 1886, when the editor commented that "the elegant and graceful building whose engraving we give on this page (The Chalet of Mr. Mancellos Ferraz) deserved the great honour of being reproduced in a superb photograph by our kind and distinguished collaborator, the esteemed Mrs. Margarida Relvas. This suffices as praise of its picturesque aspect and to explain the reason that led us to give it coverage in Illustração Universal". Other periodicals that she contributed to included Moniteur de la Photographie, Photographic News, Anthony's Photographic Bulletin, Bulletin Belge de la Photographie, Philadelphia Photographer, O Occidente, and Correspondência de Figueira.

In 1887, Relvas married Alberto de Campos Navarro, a doctor, and moved to Torres Novas, abandoning her photographic career and concentrating on oil and watercolour painting. They had three children. In moving, she lost her access to her studio at her father's home and it is possible that this, plus her three daughters, who were born in quick succession, led to the end of her interest in photography. Also, her mother died in 1887 and she became estranged from her father when he remarried in 1888. From that year her health began to weaken and she lost weight. There are, however, several drawings and paintings signed by her, as Margarida Navarro, dated between 1894 and 1900.

== Death ==
Relvas died at Quinta dos Pinheiros, Torres Novas in 1930, from cardiac problems. Her name was given to a street in Golegã.

An exhibition of her work was held at the National Museum of Contemporary Art of Chiado in Lisbon at the end of 2025. The exhibition also included photographs by two other early Portuguese women photographers, Mariana Relvas, second wife of Carlos Relvas, and Maria Lemos de Magalhães.
