= Red urine =

Red urine may refer to:

- Beeturia, betacyanin-colored urine
- Blood-colored urine, including:
  - Hematuria, the presence of red blood cells (erythrocytes) in the urine
  - Hemoglobinuria, excess hemoglobin filtered by the kidneys into the urine
