= Maria Lemos de Magalhães =

Portuguese photographer (1863–1949)

- Born: 11 February 1863; Condeixa-a-Nova, district of Coimbra, Portugal
- Died: 15 November 1949 (aged 86)
- Known for: Photography
- Spouse: Luiz Cipriano Coelho de Magalhães

Maria da Conceição de Lemos Magalhães (1863–1949) was the most prolific female amateur photographer of the early 20th century in Portugal. She explored themes related to the land and the sea, rural work, and women in natural environments and also studied the chemistry of photography.

== Early life ==
Magalhães was born as Maria da Conceição de Lemos Pereira de Lacerda Sant'Iago on 11 February 1863 in Condeixa-a-Nova in the district of Coimbra in the centre of Portugal. She was the daughter of Ramalho Pereira de Azeredo Coutinho (1812–1895), who had the rank of Count, and Amelia da Madre de Deus Sant'Iago (1841–1897). In 1884 she married, in Porto, a politician and journalist, Luiz Cipriano Coelho de Magalhães (1859–1935). They lived in Moreira da Maia in the Greater Porto area, and were to have four children.

== Photography ==
It is unclear how or why Magalhães took up photography, but by the early 20th century she was becoming well known both in Portugal and abroad. She was certainly exposed to artistic influences at her home, known as the Quinta do Mosteiro, which hosted influential writers and painters. Additionally, her husband had close connections with the Portuguese Royal Family, several of whose members were involved in photography. When the Royal Family was exiled to London after the 5 October 1910 revolution against the monarchy, her family accompanied the deposed king to London, not returning until 1914 after her husband was granted an amnesty. Little is known about her photography after she returned to Portugal.

She paid close attention to laboratory processing and studied the chemistry applied to photography. Using up-to-date photographic techniques such as bromoil, she gained recognition through exhibitions and through the publication of her photographs in both national and foreign periodicals. In 1906 she exhibited at the Salon du Photo-Club de Paris, and a year later in Turin at the International Exhibition of Artistic and Scientific Photography. Her magazine contributions included the British magazine, The Studio, with her 1908 work, Cloud Effect. The following year, Passing Boat was published in the Portuguese Boletim Photographico, which also published other photographs by her. In the same year she participated in the International Exhibition of Photography in Dresden, and in the Portuguese Exhibition of Modern Amateur Photography. In May 1910, she took part in the Exhibition of Artistic Photography, held by the Portuguese Society of Photography, of which she was an invited member of the founding group of photographers.

== Other activities ==
Magalhães was president of the Porto branch of the Portuguese Women's Assistance to Victims of War, an association promoted by the aristocracy. Her son, Jose, is believed to have fought in World War I, and to have died from war wounds in 1922. An image captured before his departure for the war is the last she is known to have taken. In 1945 she donated to the National Museum of Contemporary Art of Chiado in Lisbon a portrait of the Azorean writer, Antero de Quental, by Columbano Bordalo Pinheiro.

== Death and legacy ==
Magalhães died on 15 November 1949. She left a vast body of work that was never published in her lifetime. Her photographic estate is divided between the collections of the Mascarenhas Gaivão Family, the Casa de Mateus Foundation, and of Rita van Zeller, her great-granddaughter.

An exhibition of her work was held at the National Museum of Contemporary Art of Chiado in Lisbon at the end of 2025. The exhibition also included the photographs of two other early Portuguese women photographers, Margarida Relvas and Mariana Relvas, respectively the daughter and second wife of the noted photographer, Carlos Relvas.
