= Punkie Night =

English custom practiced on the last Thursday of October

Punkie Night is a traditional West Country holiday practised on the last Thursday of October in Somerset. Children will march around with a punkie, that is a jack o'lantern traditionally made from a mangelwurzel, singing the following song :

It's Punkie Night tonight
It's Punkie Night tonight
Adam and Eve would not believe
It's Punkie Night tonight

There are some variants which also include these lines:

"Give me a candle, give me a light If you don't, you'll get a fright"

or alternatively:

"Give me a candle give me light If you haven't a candle, a penny's all right"

(Cooper & Sullivan, 1994).

As Cooper and Sullivan (1994) explain, this relates to the tradition of children would begging for candles on this night, and threaten people who refused to give them anything (compare the custom of Trick or Treat). Cooper and Sullivan also explain how a Punkie King and a Punkie Queen would typically lead the proceedings.

== Origins of the custom ==
The custom originated in the village of Hinton St George in Somerset when the menfolk had gone to a fair in Chiselborough a few miles away. They got drunk and fell asleep so the wives had to get them back home safely. They created lanterns out of mangelwurzels to stop the candles blowing out as there was a gale that night. When the men first saw the lanterns they thought they were will'o'the wisps. It is almost certainly linked with Hallowe'en and similar traditions can be found across the West Country. As Morrell (1977) explains, the word "Punkie"is an old English name for a lantern, and jack o'lanterns for Punkie Night may be made of swedes or mangel-wurzels rather than pumpkins. An alternative explanation of the term is that it is derived from pumpkin or punk, meaning tinder. Cooper and Sullivan (1994) attribute the custom's origins to a fair which was at one time held at Chiselborough. Men who would come back late from the fair would often need candles as lights to guide them home, in late October, which, as Cooper and Sullivan explain, would lead either to women making a jack o'lantern for their husbands, or men making the jack o'lantern, according to different versions of story.

Morrell explains how, in earlier times, farmers would put a traditional "Punkie" on their gates to ward off evil spirits at this time of year.

The festival has been celebrated at various sites including Castle Neroche in the Blackdown Hills, Long Sutton, Drayton, Somerset and, more commonly, at Hinton St George and the neighbouring village of Lopen. In Ireland there is a similar Halloween tradition called Púca Night. (Welsh: Pwca, Cornish: Bucca, English: Pooka) Púca is a Celtic name for faeries or sprites. Children dress up in costumes going from door to door asking for treats for the Púca Night.
