= Igreja Matriz da Golegã =

Church in Golegães Municipality, Portugal

Coordinates: 39°24′06″N 8°29′12″W

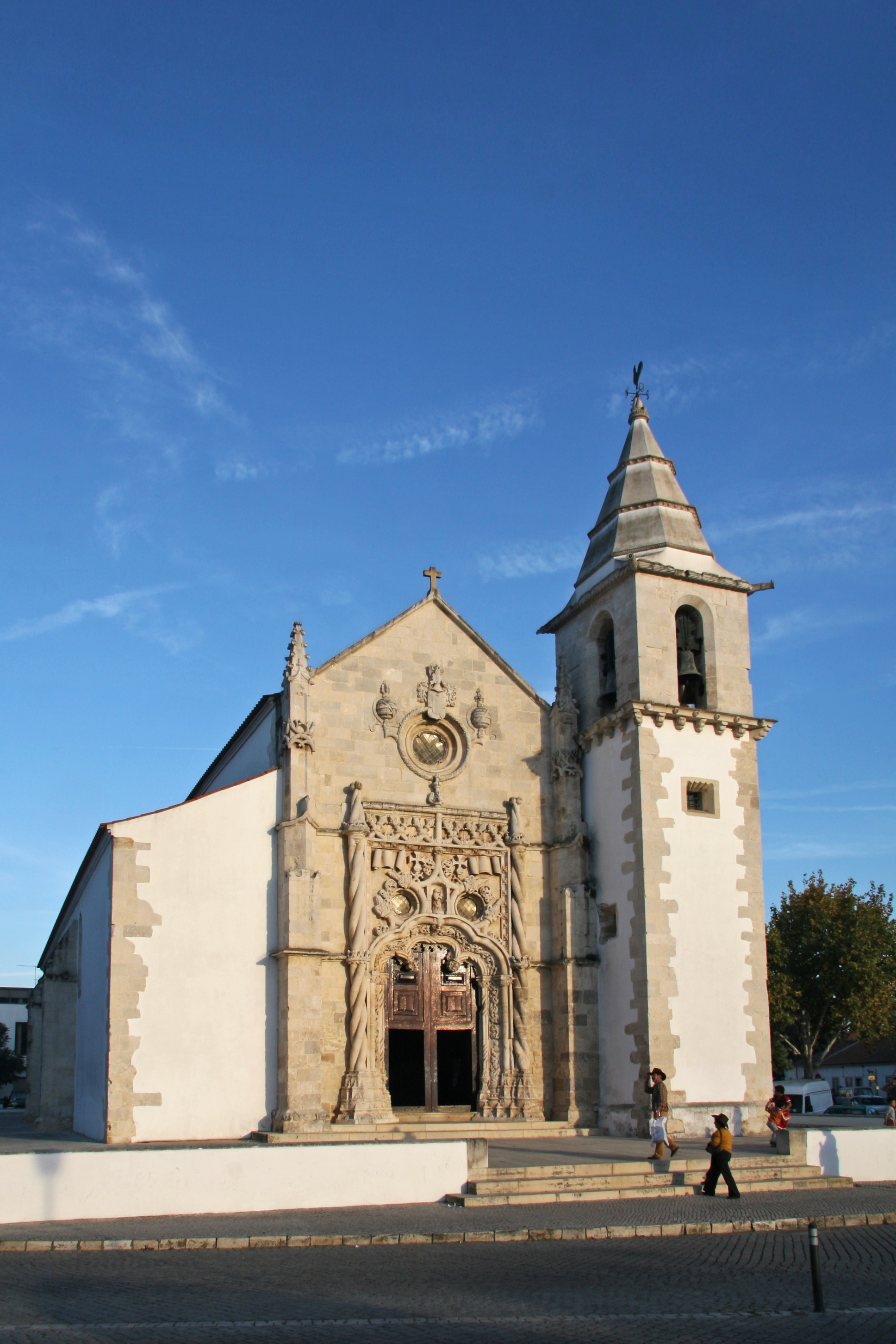
Igreja Matriz da Golegã

Igreja Matriz da Golegã is a church in the town Golegã, Portugal. It is classified as a National Monument.
