= Pombalinho =

- Civil parish
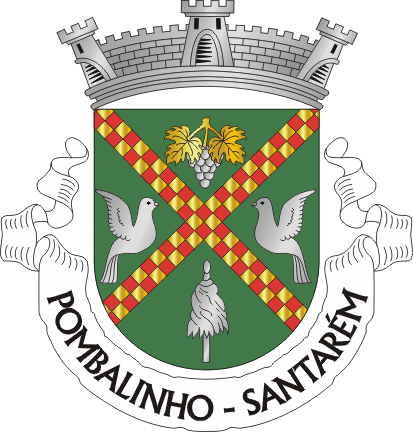
- Coat of arms

- Location in Portugal
- Coordinates: 39.343°N 8.555°W
- Country: Portugal
- Region: Oeste e Vale do Tejo
- Intermunic. comm.: Lezíria do Tejo
- District: Santarém
- Municipality: Golegã

Area
  - Total: 7.70 km^{2} (2.97 sq mi)

Population (2011)
  - Total: 448
  - Density: 58/km^{2} (150/sq mi)
- Time zone: UTC+00:00 (WET)
  - Summer (DST): UTC+01:00 (WEST)
- Postal code: 2150
- Area code: 243

Pombalinho (Portuguese pronunciation: [põbɐˈliɲu]) is a village and a civil parish in the municipality of Golegã, Portugal. The population in 2011 was 448, in an area of 7.70 km^{2}.

== History ==
Located on the right bank of the Tagus River, 22 kilometers northeast of the city of Santarém, in Roman antiquity it was an important satellite town of that city, which was founded by the Romans who occupied the region in the 2nd century BC and named the larger settlement Scalabis. Pombalinho was formerly called Santa Cruz do Pombal but became known from the 18th century onwards by the name of Pombalinho to distinguish it from other villages with the same name, especially the town of Pombal. The 1st Baron of Pombalinho, António Vasques da Cunha de Araújo Porto Carrero, was mentioned on Almeida Garrett's (1799 – 1854) Viagens na Minha Terra (Travels in My Homeland). Before 2013, it was part of Santarém municipality. In 2013 the civil parish of Pombalinho was merged into the municipality of Golegã.

== Geography ==
The territory of this village and respective civil parish, in the fertile Lezíria do Tejo (roughly the same area of the historical province of Ribatejo), is almost exclusively used for agriculture. Pombalinho's festivities take place in the festival of Saint Sebastian from 27 to 29 June, with mass singing, sermon, procession, Cavalhadas, among other activities.

== Heraldry ==
Symbolism of the Coat: The green shield represents agriculture. Aspa checker of red and gold, the combination of the patron saint (Santa Cruz) and colors of the arms of the baron Pombalinho (chess with gold, and the quote of Portocarreras loaded with pictures of red gold, the rocks), and a Roman pavement made recently discovered, with parallelepiped of various colors. Two doves in silver, outlined in the flanks, speaker element. Bunch of grapes silver, sheets of gold, to represent a source of wealth of the parish. Roca linen on edge, with other agricultural production. The flag is yellow, color of the pieces taken from the main shield.

== Culture and sports ==
- Soccer Field
- Group of Folklore dancing and singing of Ribatejo - POMBALINHO
- Vera Cruz Football Club
- House People's Pombalinho
- Annual Festivals S. Sebastian

== Mayors since 1921 ==
Extended content

Name	Term Start.	Term End.	Party
Júlio José Barreiros	21-February-1921	21-March-1921	Socialist
Manuel Martinho Gameiro	30-April-1921	2-January-1922	Socialist
António Eugénio de Menezes	16-January-1922	17-December-1925	Socialist
Joaquim Gonçalves Ferreira	2-January-1926	7-January-1938	Socialist
Manuel Monteiro Barbosa	7-January-1938	7-January-1942	Socialist
Manuel Gameiro Duarte	28-February-1942	4-January-1946	Socialist
António Alegre Mota	4-January-1946	22-December-1946	Socialist
António Fonseca Barreiros	2-January-1947	3-January-1951	Socialist
Herminio Correia Minderico	3-January-1951	5-January-1960	Socialist
Joaquim Pedro de Menezes	5-January-1960	2-November-1960	Socialist
Diamantino Carvalho	15-November-1963	3-January-1972	Socialist
Francisco Conceição Cruz	3-January-1972	3-October-1973	Socialist
José Carvalho Madeira	3-January-1973	13-January-1975	Socialist
José Carvalho Gomes	13-January-1975	8-January-1977	Socialist
Francisco Brás Barrão Júnior	8-January-1977	4-January-1986	Socialist
Francisco Bispo	4-January-1986	5-January-1990	Communist
Joaquim Manuel Barreiros Mateiro (Note: Resigned due to health problems.)	5-January-1990	31-December-2004	Socialist
Manuel João Bonifácio	28-October-2005	11-October-2009	Socialist
Luís Filipe Júlio	11-October-2009	Incumbent	MICP (Mov. Indep. Cidadãos Pombalinho)
