= Golegã =

- Municipality
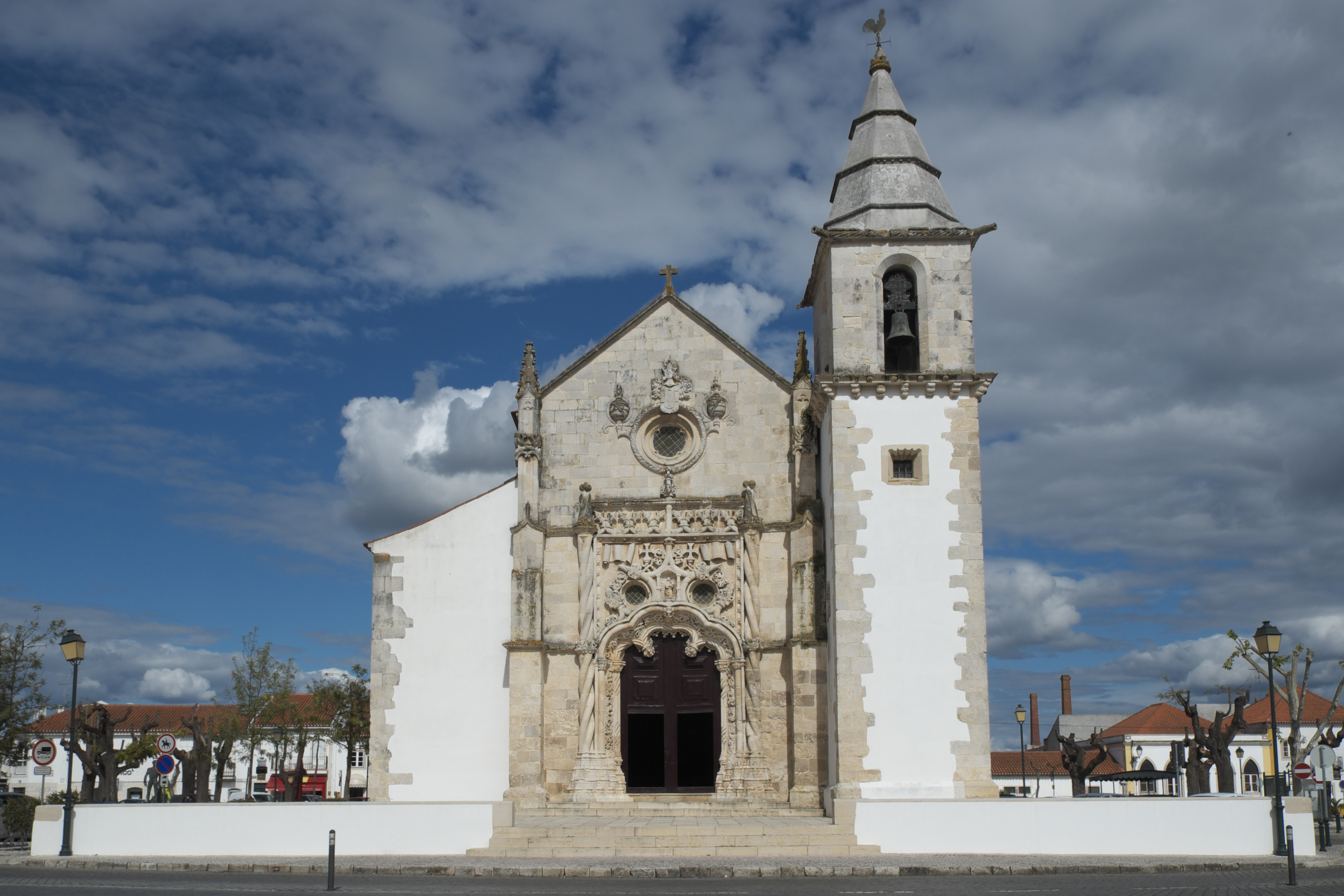
- Igreja Matriz da Golegã, Golegã

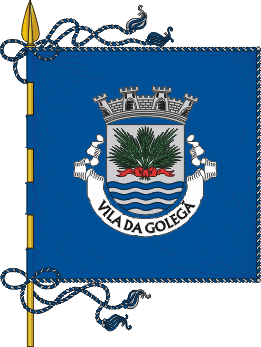
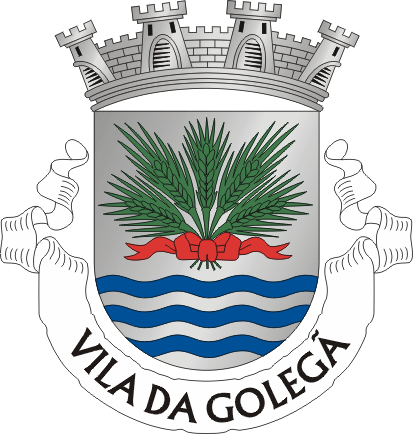
- Flag Coat of arms
- Interactive map of Golegã
- Location in Portugal
- Coordinates: 39°24′N 8°29′W
- Country: Portugal
- Region: Oeste e Vale do Tejo
- Intermunic. comm.: Lezíria do Tejo
- District: Santarém
- Parishes: 3

Government
  - President: José Tavares Veiga Silva Maltez (PS)

Area
  - Total: 84.32 km^{2} (32.56 sq mi)

Population (2011)
  - Total: 5,913
  - Density: 70.13/km^{2} (181.6/sq mi)
- Time zone: UTC+00:00 (WET)
  - Summer (DST): UTC+01:00 (WEST)
- Local holiday: Ascension Day (date varies)
- Website: www.cm-golega.pt

Golegã (European Portuguese pronunciation: [ɡulɨˈɣɐ̃]) is a town and municipality in Santarém District, Portugal. The population of the municipality in 2011 was 5,913, in an area of 84.32 km².

The present Mayor is Rui Manuel Lince Singeis Medinas Duarte, elected by the Socialist Party. The municipal holiday is Ascension Day.

== Historical sights ==
The main historical sight of Golegã is its main church Igreja Matriz da Golegã, built in the early 16th century in Manueline (Portuguese late Gothic) style. The remarkable main portal and the ribbed vaulting inside the main chapel are its most important artistic features. Near Golegã village is located the Quinta da Cardiga, a manor house with its origin in a 12th-century donation to the Knights Templar. Originally the site of a castle, the property was remodelled in the 16th century into a Renaissance rural palace.

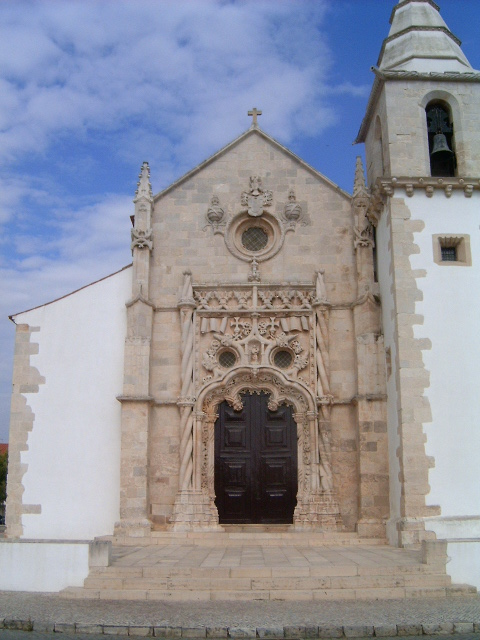
Main Church of Golegã and its Manueline portal.

== Geography ==
=== Parishes ===
Administratively, the municipality is divided into 3 civil parishes (freguesias):

- Azinhaga
- Golegã
- Pombalinho

=== Population ===
Population of Golegã municipality
1801	1849	1900	1930	1960	1981	1991	2001	2011
2452	2866	5694	6325	6150	5963	6072	5710	5913

== Economy ==
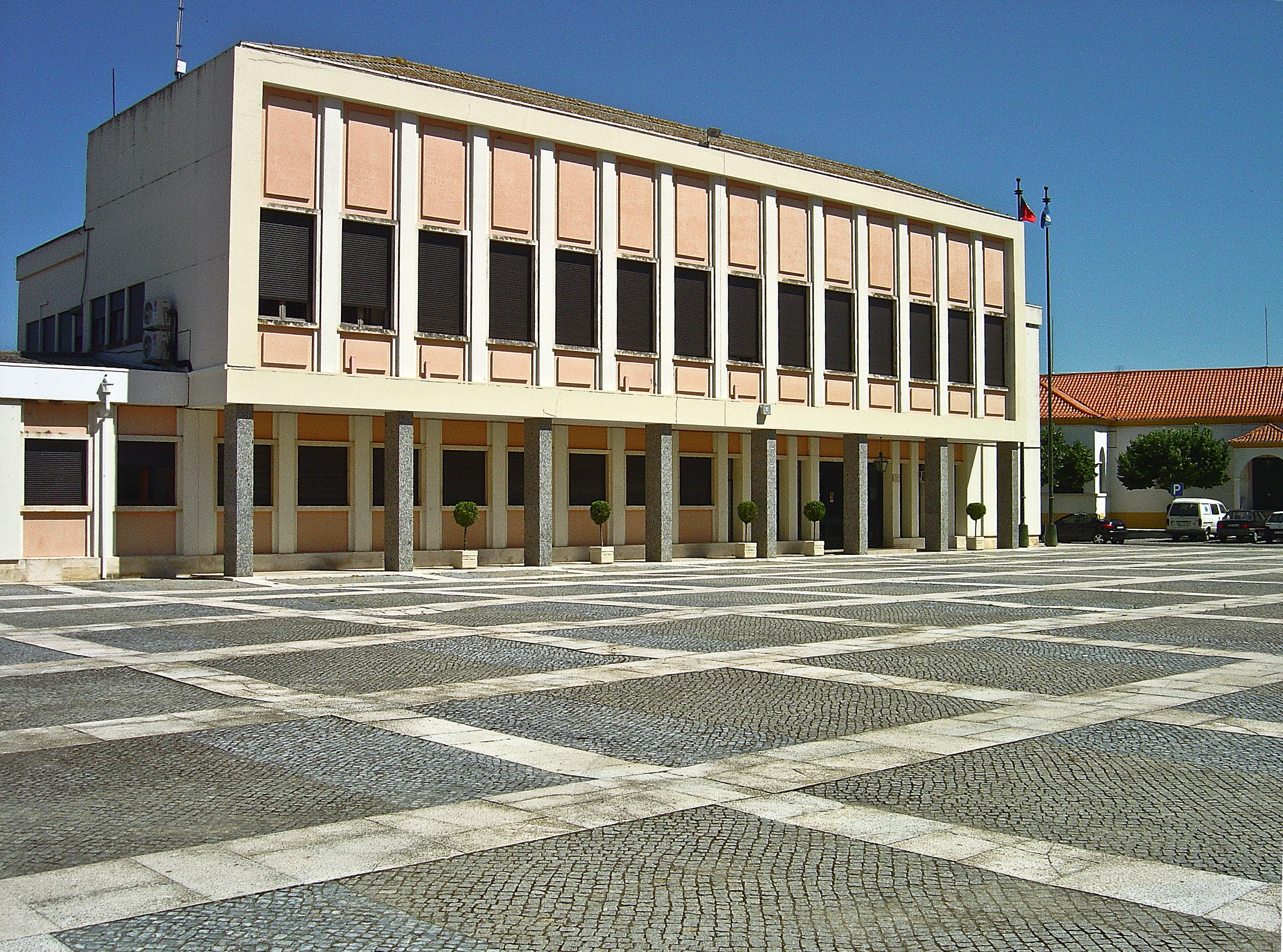
Câmara Municipal (City Hall), Golegã (2008)

The main agricultural productions in the municipality are maize and Beta vulgaris. The area is a reputed animal breeding center and an internationally renowned cattle and horse market. Golegã is considered the capital of the horse (Capital do Cavalo), and it has been the site for the gathering of breeders since at least the 18th century. Two fairs take place every November in Golegã: The Feira Nacional do Cavalo (National Horse Fair) and the Feira Internacional do Cavalo Lusitano (International Lusitano Horse Fair), dedicated to the Pure Blood Lusitano.

== Notable persons ==
- Carlos Relvas (1838 in Golegã – 1894) a wealthy landowner and amateur bullfighter.
- José Relvas (1858 in Golegã – 1929) a politician and 70th Prime Minister of Portugal in 1919.
- José Saramago (1922 in Azinhaga – 2010) writer, the winner of the 1998 Nobel Prize in Literature.
- Manuel Bento (1948 in Golegã – 2007) football goalkeeper with 63 caps for Portugal including participation in the 1984 UEFA European Football Championship and the 1986 FIFA World Cup as well as 324 club caps, mainly for S.L. Benfica.
