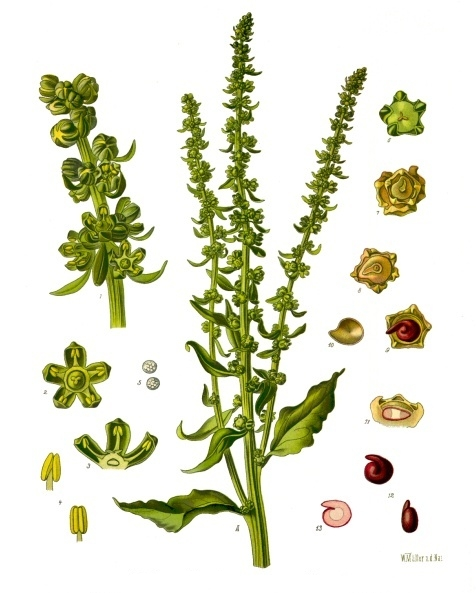
- Beta vulgaris subsp. vulgaris

Scientific classification
- Kingdom: Plantae
- Clade: Embryophytes
- Clade: Tracheophytes
- Clade: Spermatophytes
- Clade: Angiosperms
- Clade: Eudicots
- Order: Caryophyllales
- Family: Amaranthaceae
- Genus: Beta
- Species: B. vulgaris

Binomial name
- Beta vulgaris L.

Synonyms
- List: Beta alba DC.; Beta altissima Steud.; Beta atriplicifolia Rouy; Beta bengalensis Roxb.; Beta brasiliensis Scheidw.; Beta carnulosa Gren.; Beta cicla (L.) L.; Beta cicla var. argentea Krassochkin & Burenin; Beta cicla var. viridis Krassochkin & Burenin; Beta crispa Tratt.; Beta decumbens Moench; Beta esculenta Salisb.; Beta hortensis Mill.; Beta hybrida Andrz.; Beta incarnata Steud.; Beta lutea Steud.; Beta marina Crantz; Beta maritima L.; Beta maritima subsp. atriplicifolia (Rouy) Burenin; Beta maritima subsp. marcosii (O.Bolòs & Vigo) Juan & M.B.Crespo; Beta maritima subsp. orientalis (Roth) Burenin; Beta noeana Bunge ex Boiss.; Beta orientalis Roth; Beta purpurea Steud.; Beta rapa Dumort.; Beta rapacea Hegetschw.; Beta rosea Steud.; Beta sativa Bernh.; Beta stricta K.Koch; Beta sulcata Gasp.; Beta triflora Salisb.; Beta vulgaris var. aurantia Burenin; Beta vulgaris var. coniciformis Burenin; Beta vulgaris var. marcosii O.Bolòs & Vigo; Beta vulgaris var. maritima (L.) Moq.; Beta vulgaris var. mediasiatica Burenin; Beta vulgaris var. ovaliformis Burenin; Beta vulgaris var. rapacea W.D.J.Koch; Beta vulgaris var. rubidus Burenin; Beta vulgaris var. rubrifolia Krassochkin ex Burenin; Beta vulgaris var. virescens Burenin; Beta vulgaris var. viridifolia Krassochkin ex Burenin

= Beta vulgaris =

Species of flowering plant

Beta vulgaris (beet) is a species of flowering plant in the subfamily Betoideae of the family Amaranthaceae. It is a perennial plant usually growing up to 120 centimetres (4 ft) tall.

Three subspecies are typically recognised. The wild ancestor of all the cultivated beets is the sea beet (Beta vulgaris subsp. maritima), with several modern cultivars all belonging to B. vulgaris subsp. vulgaris.

Some of the most popular cultivar groups include: the sugar beet (used to produce table sugar), the root vegetable known as the beetroot or garden beet, the leaf vegetable known as chard or spinach beet or silverbeet, and mangelwurzel (a fodder crop).

== Description ==
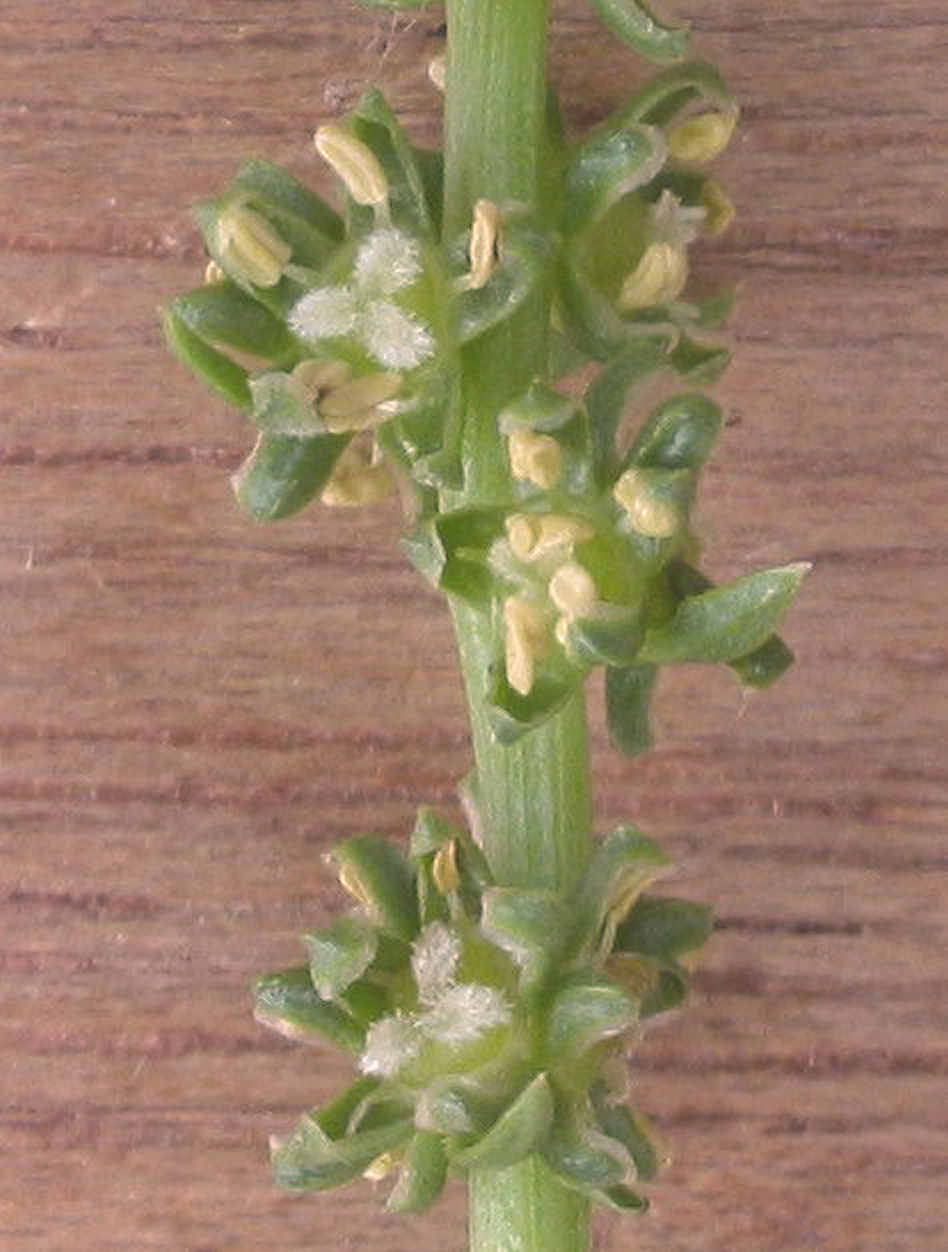
Flowers of Beta vulgaris

Beta vulgaris is a herbaceous biennial or, rarely, perennial plant up to 120 centimetres (4 ft) in height, rarely 200 cm; cultivated forms are mostly biennial. The roots of cultivated forms are dark red, white, or yellow and moderately to strongly swollen and fleshy (subsp. vulgaris); they are brown, fibrous, sometimes swollen, and woody in the wild subspecies. The stems grow erect or, in the wild forms, often procumbent; they are simple or branched in the upper part, and their surface is ribbed and striate. The basal leaves have a long petiole (which may be thickened and red, white, or yellow in some cultivars). The simple leaf blade is oblanceolate to heart-shaped, dark green to dark red, slightly fleshy, usually with a prominent midrib, with entire or undulate margin, 5–20 cm long on wild plants (often much larger in cultivated plants). The upper leaves are smaller, their blades are rhombic to narrowly lanceolate.

The flowers are produced in dense spike-like, basally interrupted inflorescences. Very small flowers sit in one- to three- (rarely eight-) flowered glomerules in the axils of short bracts or in the upper half of the inflorescence without bracts. The hermaphrodite flowers are urn-shaped, green or tinged reddish, and consist of five basally connate perianth segments (tepals), 3–5 × 2–3 mm, 5 stamens, and a semi-inferior ovary with 2–3 stigmas. The perianths of neighbouring flowers are often fused. Flowers are wind-pollinated or insect-pollinated, the former method being more important.

In fruit, the glomerules of flowers form connate hard clusters. The fruit (utricle) is enclosed by the leathery and incurved perianth, and is immersed in the swollen, hardened perianth base. The horizontal seed is lenticular, 2–3 mm, with a red-brown, shiny seed coat. The seed contains an annular embryo and copious perisperm (feeding tissue).

There are 18 chromosomes found in 2 sets, which makes beets diploid. Using chromosome number notation, 2n = 18.

Stereo image
Left frame
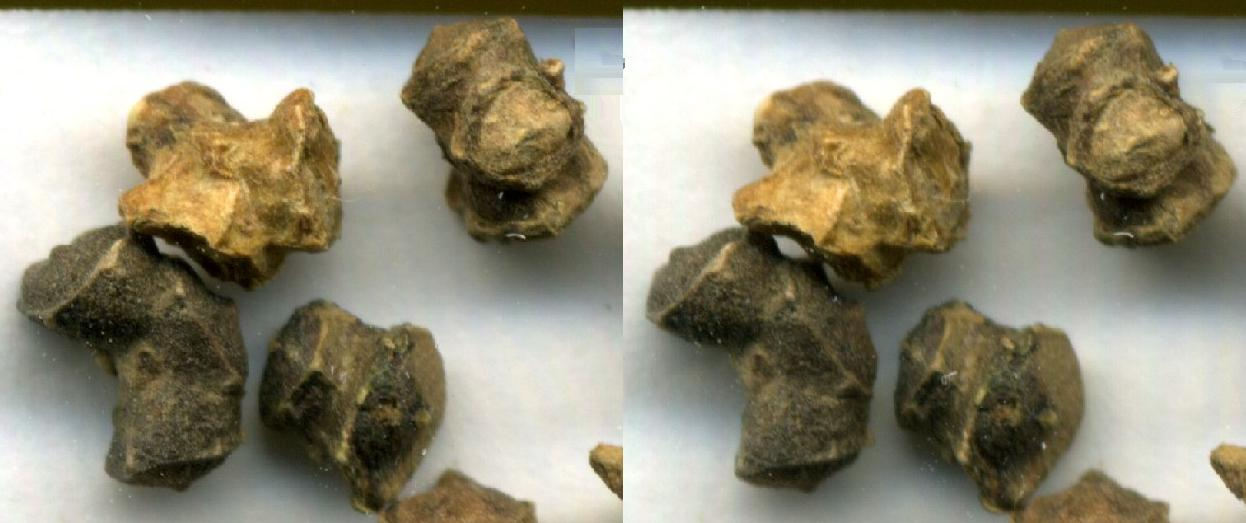
Right frame
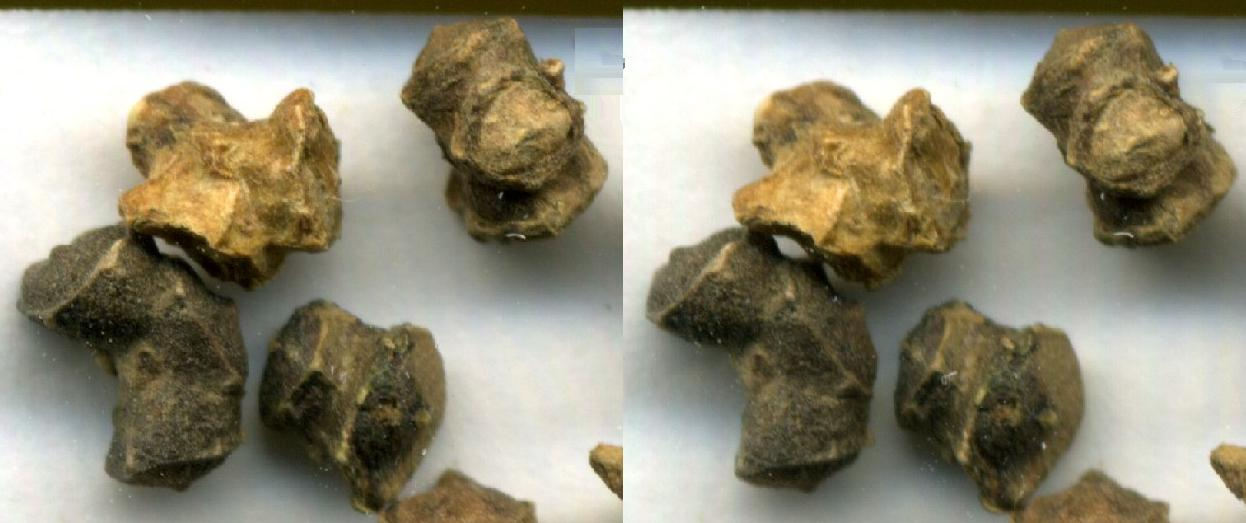
Parallel view
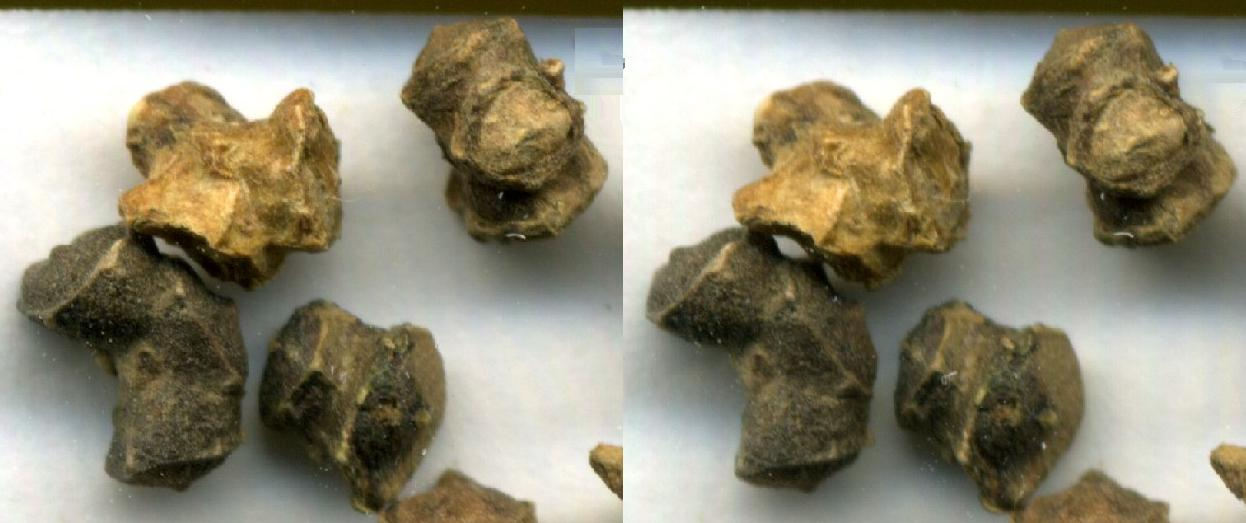
Cross-eye view
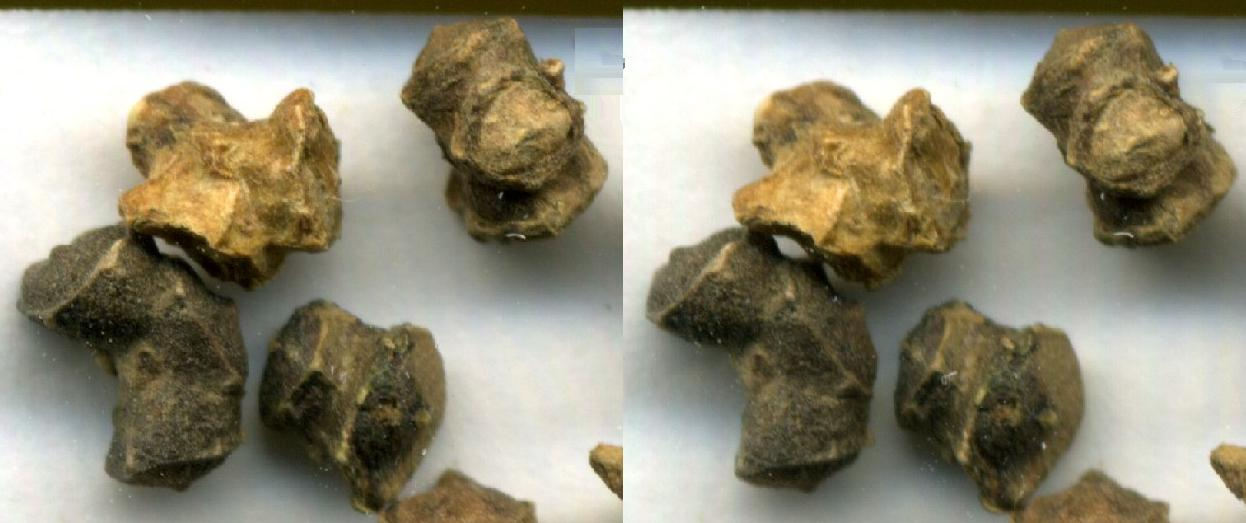

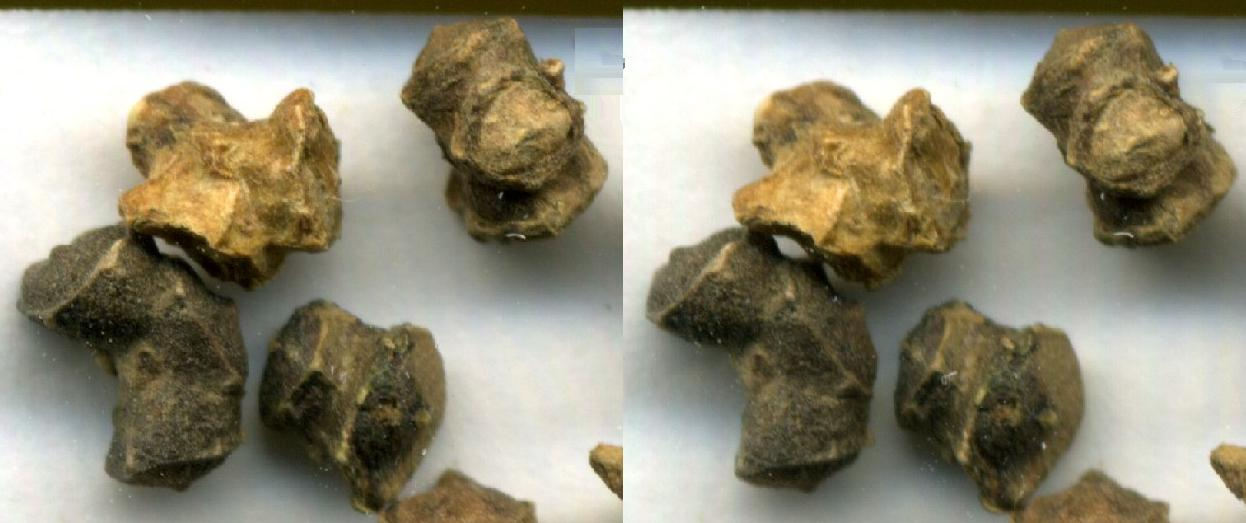

== Taxonomy ==
The species description of Beta vulgaris was made in 1753 by Carl Linnaeus in Species Plantarum, at the same time creating the genus Beta. Linnaeus regarded sea beet, chard and red beet as varieties (at that time, sugar beet and mangelwurzel had not been selected yet). In the second edition of Species Plantarum (1762), Linnaeus separated the sea beet as its own species, Beta maritima, and left only the cultivated beets in Beta vulgaris. Today sea beet and cultivated beets are considered as belonging to the same species, because they may hybridize and form fertile offspring. The taxonomy of the various cultivated races has a long and complicated history, they were treated at the rank of either subspecies, or convarieties or varieties. Now rankless cultivar groups are used, according to the International Code of Nomenclature for Cultivated Plants.

Beta vulgaris belongs to the subfamily Betoideae in family Amaranthaceae (s.l, including the Chenopodiaceae).

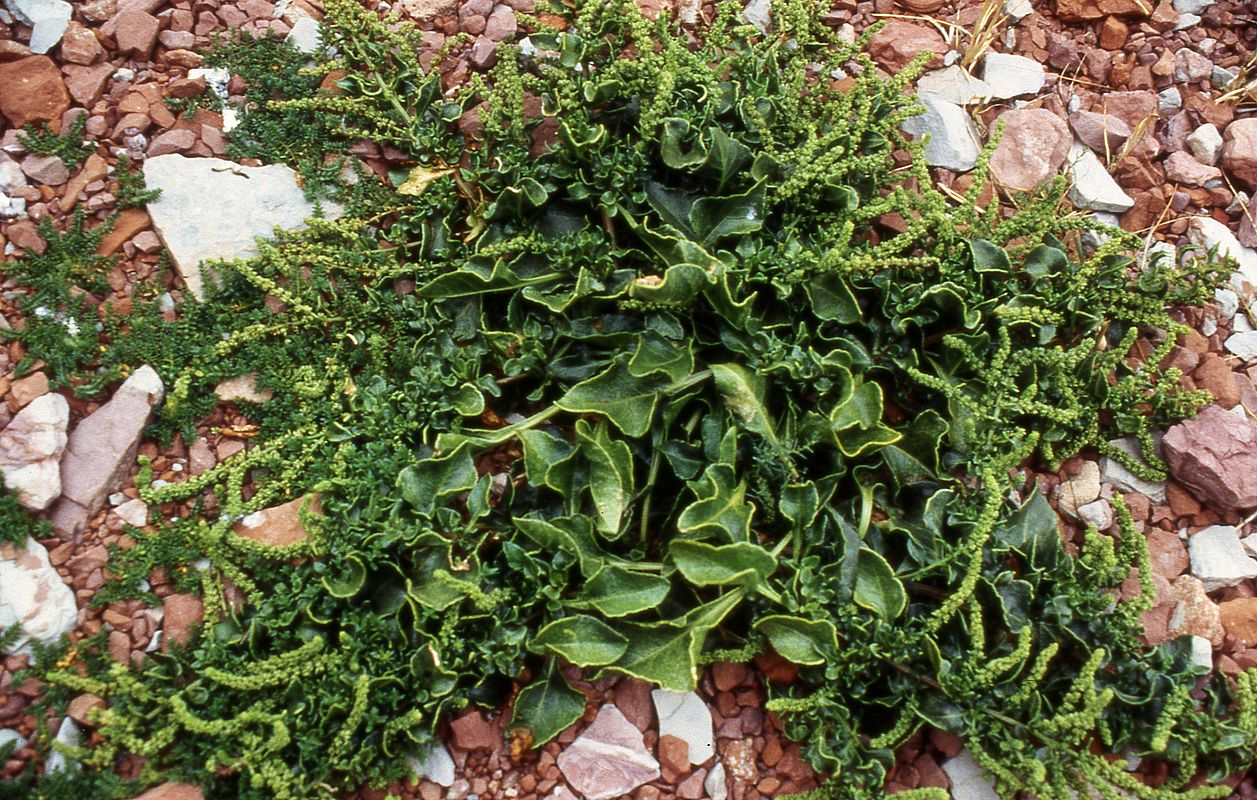
Sea beet (Beta vulgaris subsp maritima) at the shores of Heligoland

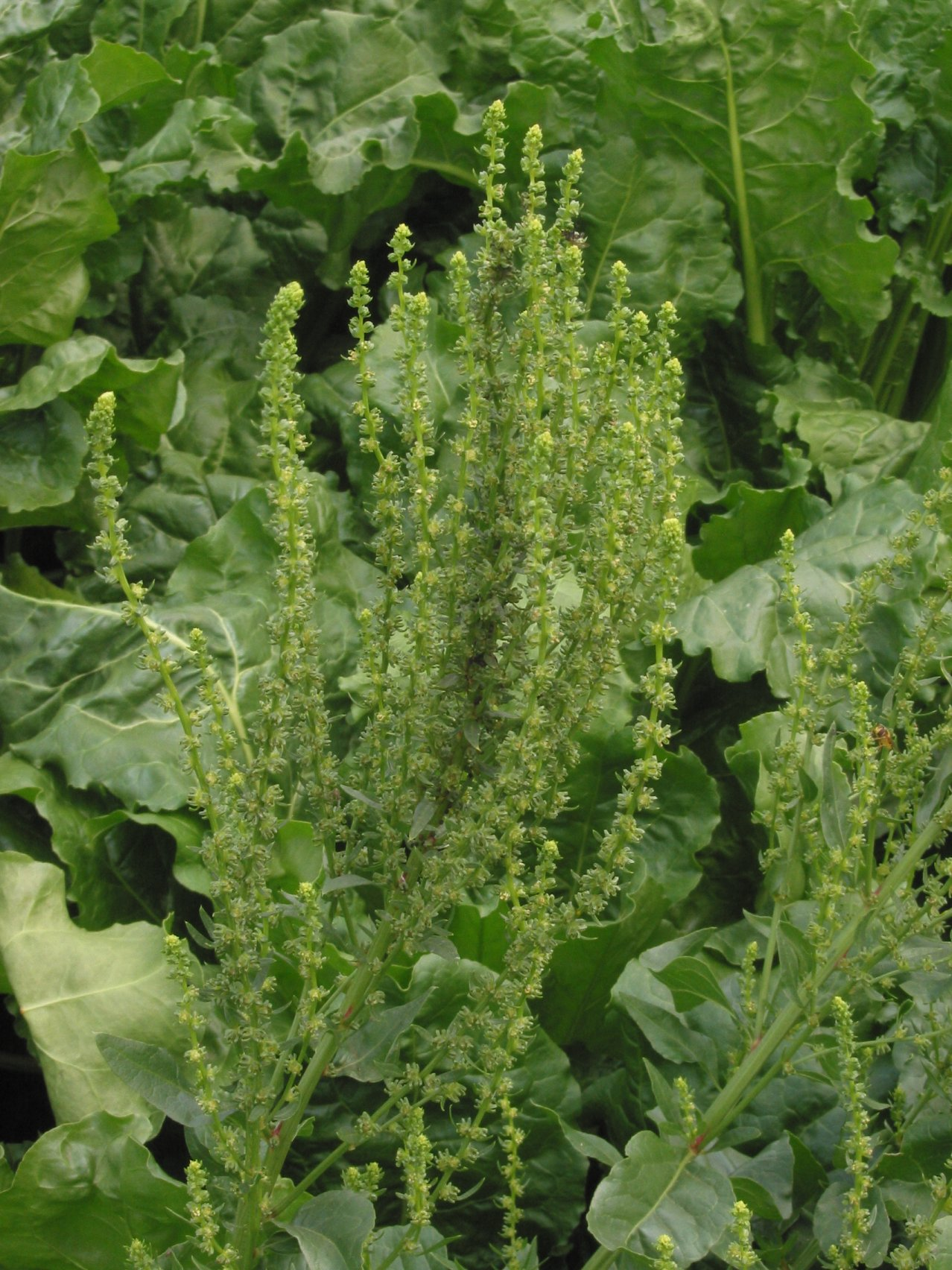
Flowering sugar beet

Beta vulgaris is classified into three subspecies:

- Beta vulgaris subsp. adanensis (Pamukç. ex Aellen) Ford-Lloyd & J.T.Williams (Syn.: Beta adanensis Pamukç. ex Aellen): occurring in disturbed habitats and steppes of Southeast Europe (Greece) and Western Asia (Cyprus, Israel, western Syria and Turkey).
- Beta vulgaris subsp. maritima, sea beet, the wild ancestor of all cultivated beets. Its distribution area reaches from the coasts of Western Europe and the Mediterranean Sea to the Near and Middle East.
- Beta vulgaris subsp. vulgaris (Syn.: Beta vulgaris subsp. cicla (L.) Arcang., Beta vulgaris subsp. rapacea (Koch) Döll).: all cultivated beets belong to this subspecies. There are five cultivar groups:
  - Altissima Group, sugar beet (Syn. B. v. subsp. v. convar. vulgaris var. altissima) - The sugar beet is a major commercial crop due to its high concentrations of sucrose, which is extracted to produce table sugar. It was developed from garden beets in Germany in the late 18th century after the roots of beets were found to contain sugar in 1747.
  - Cicla Group, spinach beet or chard (Syn. B. v. subsp. vulgaris convar. cicla var. cicla) - The leaf beet group has a long history dating to the second millennium BC. The first cultivated forms were believed to have been domesticated in the Mediterranean, but were introduced to the Middle East, India, and finally China by 850 AD. These were used as medicinal plants in Ancient Greece and Medieval Europe. Their popularity declined in Europe following the introduction of spinach. This variety is widely cultivated for its leaves, which are usually cooked like spinach. It can be found in many grocery stores around the world.
  - Flavescens Group, swiss chard (Syn. B. v. subsp. v. convar. cicla. var. flavescens) - Chard leaves have thick and fleshy midribs. Both the midribs and the leaf blades are used as vegetables, often in separate dishes. Some cultivars are also grown ornamentally for their coloured midribs. The thickened midribs are thought to have arisen from the spinach beet by mutation.
  - Conditiva Group, beetroot or garden beet (Syn. B. v. subsp. v. convar. vulgaris var. vulgaris) - This is the red root vegetable that is most typically associated with the word 'beet'. It is especially popular in Eastern Europe where it is the main ingredient of borscht.
  - Crassa Group, mangelwurzel (Syn. B. v. subsp. v. convar. vulgaris var. crassa) - This variety was developed in the 18th century from the garden beet for its tubers for use as a fodder crop.

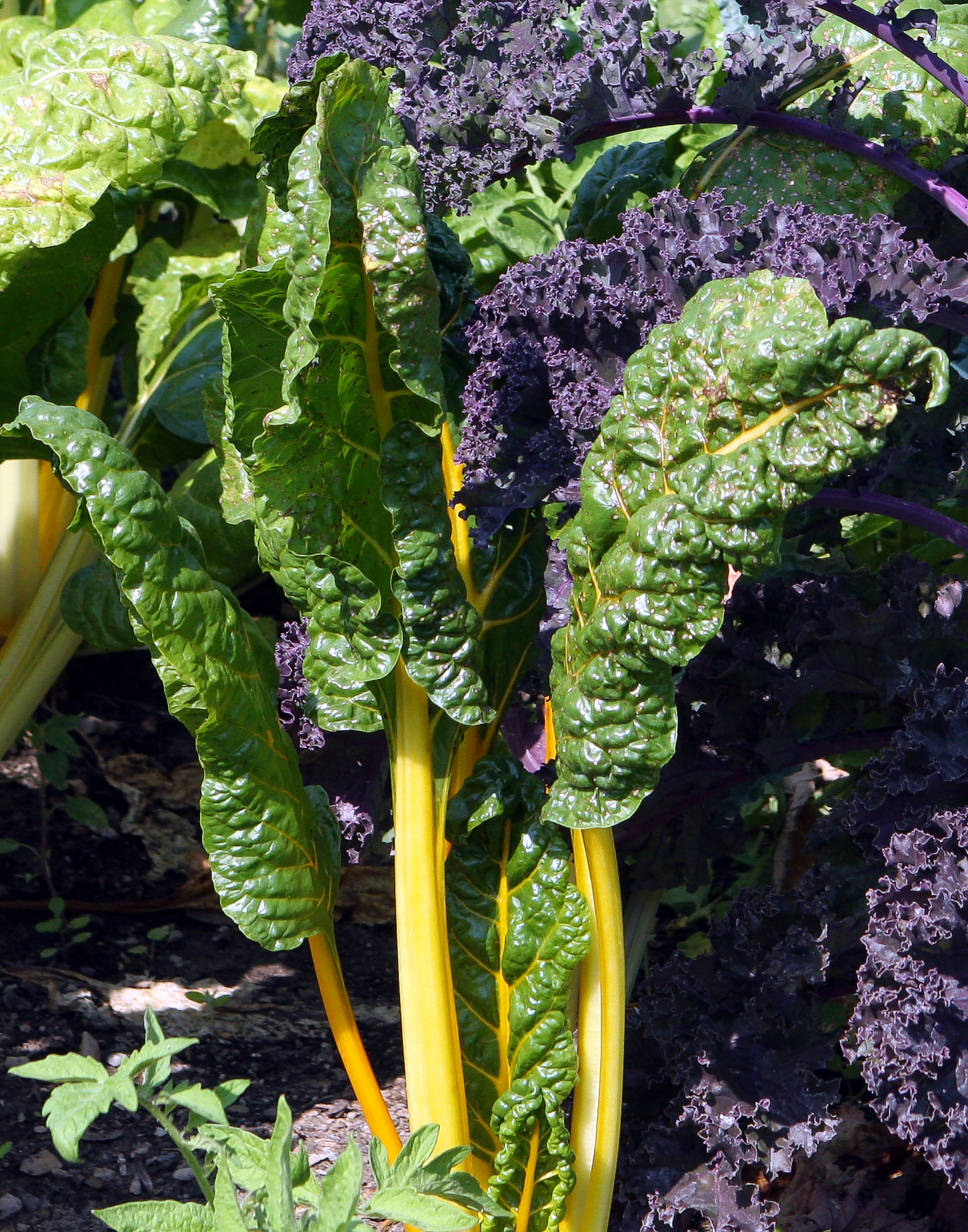
Yellow-stemmed chard (with purple-leaved kale)

== Distribution and habitat ==
The wild forms of Beta vulgaris are distributed in southwestern, northern and Southeast Europe along the Atlantic coasts and the Mediterranean Sea, in North Africa, Macaronesia, to Western Asia. Naturalized they occur in other continents. The plants grow at coastal cliffs, on stony and sandy beaches, in salt marshes or coastal grasslands, and in ruderal or disturbed places.

Cultivated beets are grown worldwide in regions without severe frosts. They prefer relatively cool temperatures between 15 and 19 °C. Leaf beets can thrive in warmer temperatures than beetroot. As descendants of coastal plants, they tolerate salty soils and drought. They grow best on pH-neutral to slightly alkaline soils containing plant nutrients and additionally sodium and boron.

== Ecology ==
Beets are a food plant for the larvae of a number of Lepidoptera species.

== Cultivation ==
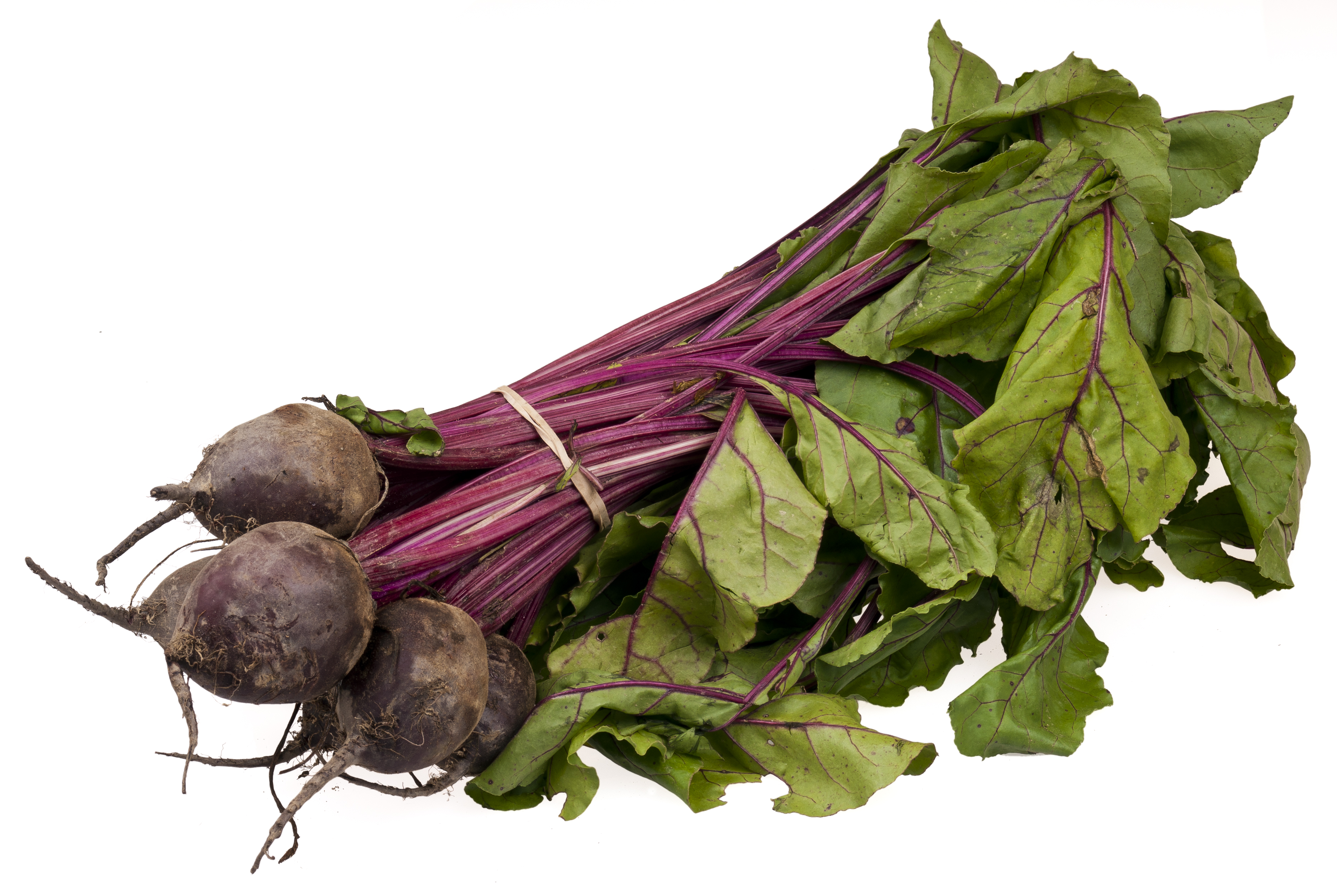
A bundle of B. vulgaris, known as beetroot

Beets are cultivated for fodder (e.g. mangelwurzel), for sugar (the sugar beet), as a leaf vegetable (chard or "Bull's Blood"), or as a root vegetable ("beetroot", "table beet", or "garden beet"). It is the most important crop of the large order Caryophyllales.

"Blood Turnip" was once a common name for beet root cultivars for the garden. Examples include: Bastian's Blood Turnip, Dewing's Early Blood Turnip, Edmand Blood Turnip, and Will's Improved Blood Turnip.

The "earthy" taste of some beetroot cultivars comes from the presence of geosmin. Researchers have not yet answered whether beets produce geosmin themselves or whether it is produced by symbiotic soil microbes living in the plant. Breeding programs can produce cultivars with low geosmin levels yielding flavours more acceptable to consumers.

Beets are one of the most boron-intensive of modern crops, a dependency possibly introduced as an evolutionary response its pre-industrial ancestor's constant exposure to sea spray; on commercial farms, a 60 tonne per hectare (26.8 ton/acre) harvest requires 600 grams of elemental boron per hectare (8.6 ounces/acre) for growth. A lack of boron causes the meristem and the shoot to languish, eventually leading to heart rot.

=== Red or purple coloring ===
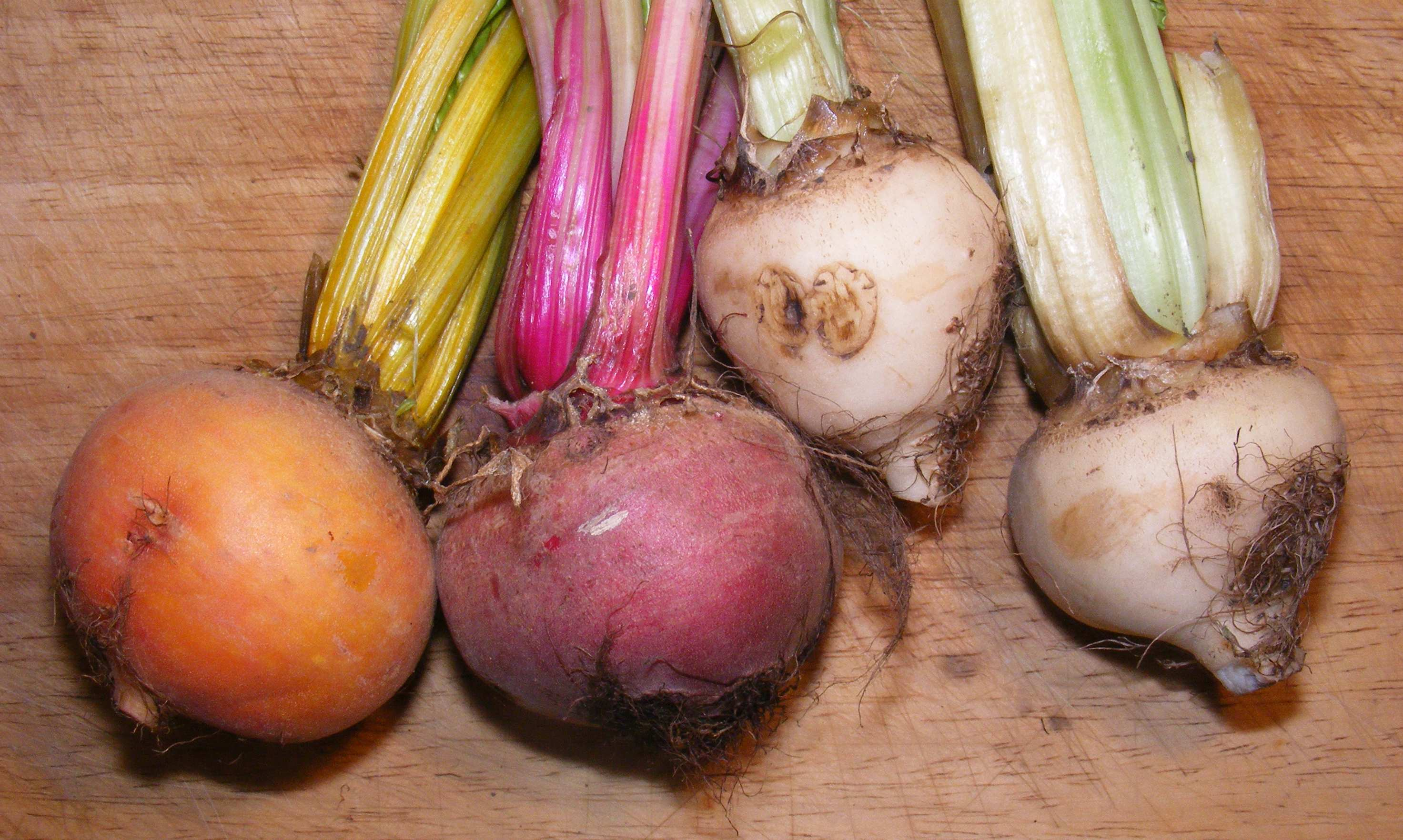
A selection of different colored beetroots

The color of red/purple beetroot is due to a variety of betalain pigments, unlike most other red plants, such as red cabbage, which contain anthocyanin pigments. The composition of different betalain pigments can vary, resulting in strains of beetroot which are yellow or other colors in addition to the familiar deep red. Some of the betalains in beets are betanin, isobetanin, probetanin, and neobetanin (the red to violet ones are known collectively as betacyanin). Other pigments contained in beet are indicaxanthin and vulgaxanthins (yellow to orange pigments known as betaxanthins). Indicaxanthin has been shown as a powerful protective antioxidant for thalassemia and prevents the breakdown of alpha-tocopherol (vitamin E).

Betacyanin in beetroot may cause red urine in people who are unable to break it down. This is called beeturia.

The pigments are contained in cell vacuoles. Beetroot cells are quite unstable and will 'leak' when cut, heated, or when in contact with air or sunlight. This is why red beetroots leave a purple stain. Leaving the skin on when cooking, however, will maintain the integrity of the cells and therefore minimize leakage.

== Uses ==
Beets, raw
Nutritional value per 100 g (3.5 oz)
- Energy: 180 kJ (43 kcal)
- Carbohydrates: 9.56 g
- Sugars: 6.76 g
- Dietary fiber: 2.8 g
- Fat: 0.17 g
- Protein: 1.61 g
Vitamins and minerals
| Vitamins | Quantity %DV^{†} |
| Vitamin A equiv. beta-Carotene | 0% 2 μg 0% 20 μg |
| Thiamine (B1) | 3% 0.031 mg |
| Riboflavin (B2) | 3% 0.04 mg |
| Niacin (B3) | 2% 0.334 mg |
| Pantothenic acid (B5) | 3% 0.155 mg |
| Vitamin B6 | 4% 0.067 mg |
| Folate (B9) | 27% 109 μg |
| Vitamin C | 5% 4.9 mg |
| Minerals | Quantity %DV^{†} |
| Calcium | 1% 16 mg |
| Iron | 4% 0.8 mg |
| Magnesium | 5% 23 mg |
| Manganese | 14% 0.329 mg |
| Phosphorus | 3% 40 mg |
| Potassium | 11% 325 mg |
| Sodium | 3% 78 mg |
| Zinc | 3% 0.35 mg |
- Other constituents: Quantity
- Water: 87.58g
- Link to USDA Database entry
- ^{†}Percentages estimated using US recommendations for adults, except for potassium, which is estimated based on expert recommendation from the National Academies.

=== Nutrition ===
In a 100 gram amount, beets supply 43 calories, contain 88% water, 10% carbohydrates, about 2% protein and have a minute amount of fat (table). The only micronutrients of significant content are folate (27% of the Daily Value, DV) and manganese (16% DV).

=== Culinary ===
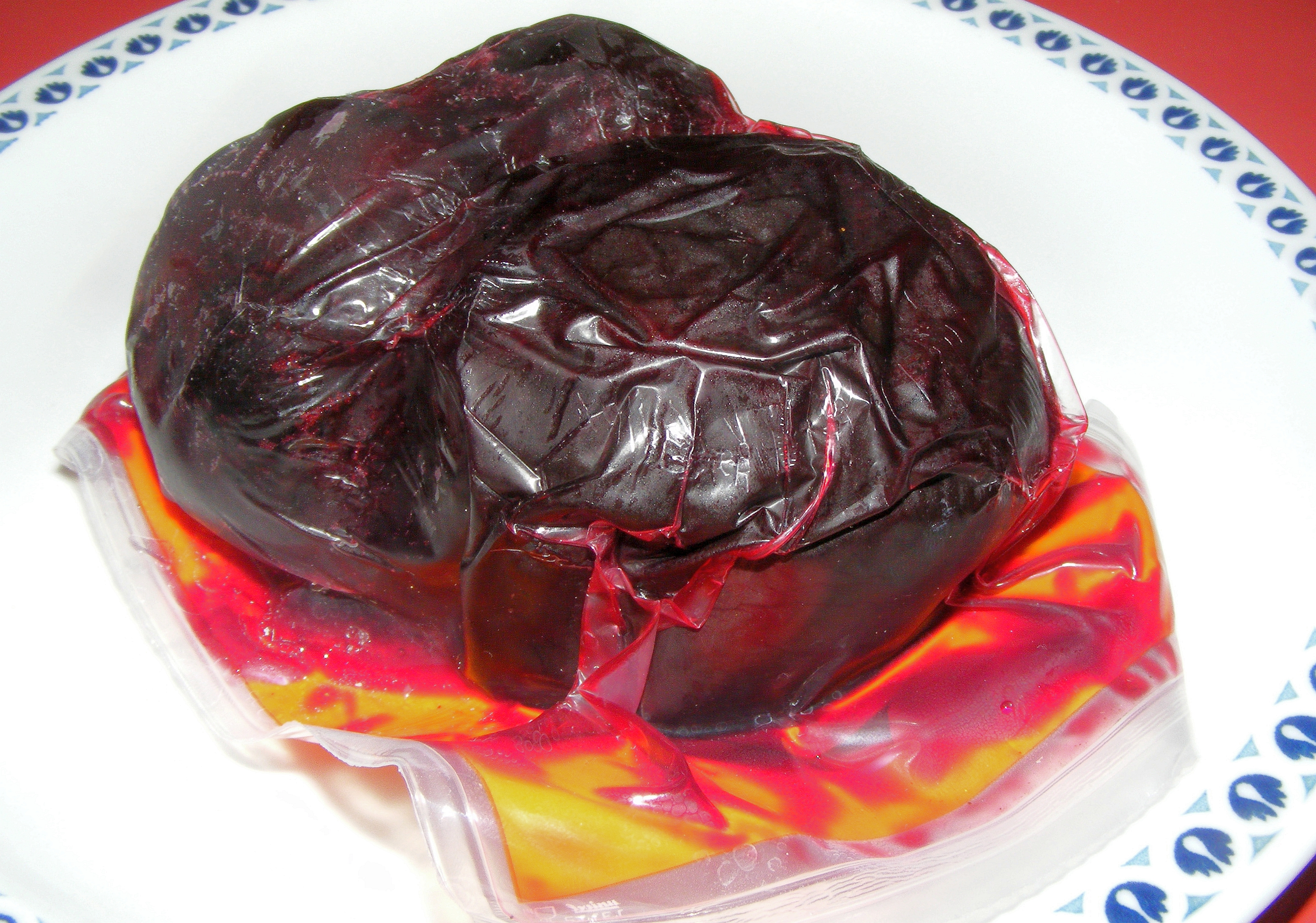
Packaged, precooked beetroot

Spinach beet leaves are eaten as a pot herb. Young leaves of the garden beet are sometimes used similarly. The midribs of Swiss chard are eaten boiled while the whole leaf blades are eaten as spinach beet.

In some parts of Africa, the whole leaf blades are usually prepared with the midribs as one dish.

The leaves and stems of young plants are steamed briefly and eaten as a vegetable; older leaves and stems are stir-fried and have a flavour resembling taro leaves.

The usually deep-red roots of garden beet can be baked, boiled, or steamed, and often served hot as a cooked vegetable or cold as a salad vegetable. They are also pickled. A large proportion of the commercial production is processed into boiled and sterilised beets or into pickles. In Eastern Europe beet soup, such as cold borsch, is a popular dish. Yellow-coloured garden beets are grown on a very small scale for home consumption.

The consumption of beets causes pink urine in some people.

Jewish people traditionally eat beet on Rosh Hashana (New Year). Its Aramaic name סלקא sounds like the word for "remove" or "depart"; it is eaten with a prayer "that our enemies be removed".

=== Traditional medicine ===
The roots and leaves of the beet have been used in traditional medicine to treat a wide variety of ailments. Ancient Romans used beetroot as a treatment for fevers and constipation, amongst other ailments. Apicius in De re coquinaria gives five recipes for soups to be given as a laxative, three of which feature the root of beet. Platina recommended taking beetroot with garlic to nullify the effects of 'garlic-breath'.

Beet greens and Swiss chard are both considered high oxalate foods which are implicated in the formation of kidney stones.

=== Phytochemicals and research ===
Betaine and betalain, two phytochemical compounds prevalent in Beta vulgaris, are under basic research for their potential biological properties.

=== Other uses ===
Cultivars with large, brightly coloured leaves are grown for decorative purposes.

== History ==
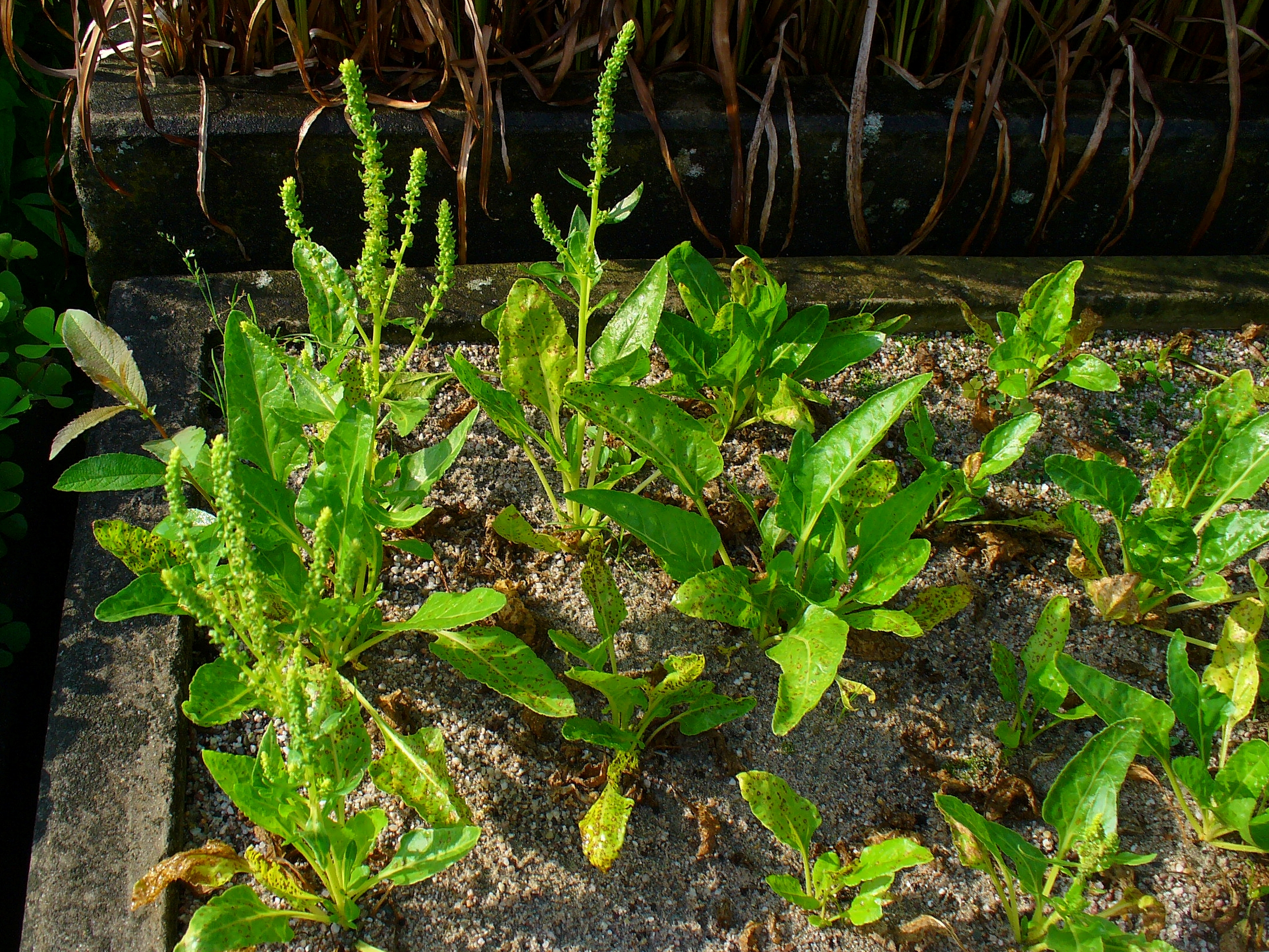
Sea beet (Beta vulgaris subsp. maritima), the wild ancestor of the cultivated forms.

The sea beet, the ancestor of modern cultivated beets, prospered along the coast of the Mediterranean Sea. Beetroot remains have been excavated in the Third dynasty Saqqara pyramid at Thebes, Egypt, and four charred beetroots were found in the Neolithic site of Aartswoud in the Netherlands though it has not been determined whether these were domesticated or wild forms of B. vulgaris. Zohary and Hopf note that beetroot is "linguistically well identified". They state the earliest written mention of the beet comes from 8th century BC Mesopotamia. The Greek Peripatetic Theophrastus later describes the beet as similar to the radish, while Aristotle also mentions the plant. Available evidence, such as that provided by Aristotle and Theophrastus, suggests the leafy varieties of the beet were grown primarily for most of its history, though these lost much of their popularity following the introduction of spinach. The ancient Romans considered beets an important health food and an aphrodisiac.

Roman and Jewish literary sources suggest that in the 1st century BC the domestic beet was represented in the Mediterranean basin primarily by leafy forms like chard and spinach beet. Zohary and Hopf also argue that it is very probable that beetroot cultivars were also grown at the time, and some Roman recipes support this. Later English and German sources show that beetroots were commonly cultivated in Medieval Europe.

=== Sugar beets ===
Modern sugar beets date back to mid-18th century Silesia where the king of Prussia subsidised experiments aimed at processes for sugar extraction. In 1747 Andreas Marggraf isolated sugar from beetroots and found them at concentrations of 1.3-1.6%. He also demonstrated that sugar could be extracted from beets that was the same as that produced from sugarcane. His student, Franz Karl Achard, evaluated 23 varieties of mangelwurzel for sugar content and selected a local race from Halberstadt in modern-day Saxony-Anhalt, Germany. Moritz Baron von Koppy and his son further selected from this race for white, conical tubers. The selection was named 'Weiße Schlesische Zuckerrübe', meaning white Silesian sugar beet, and boasted about a 6% sugar content. This selection is the progenitor of all modern sugar beets.

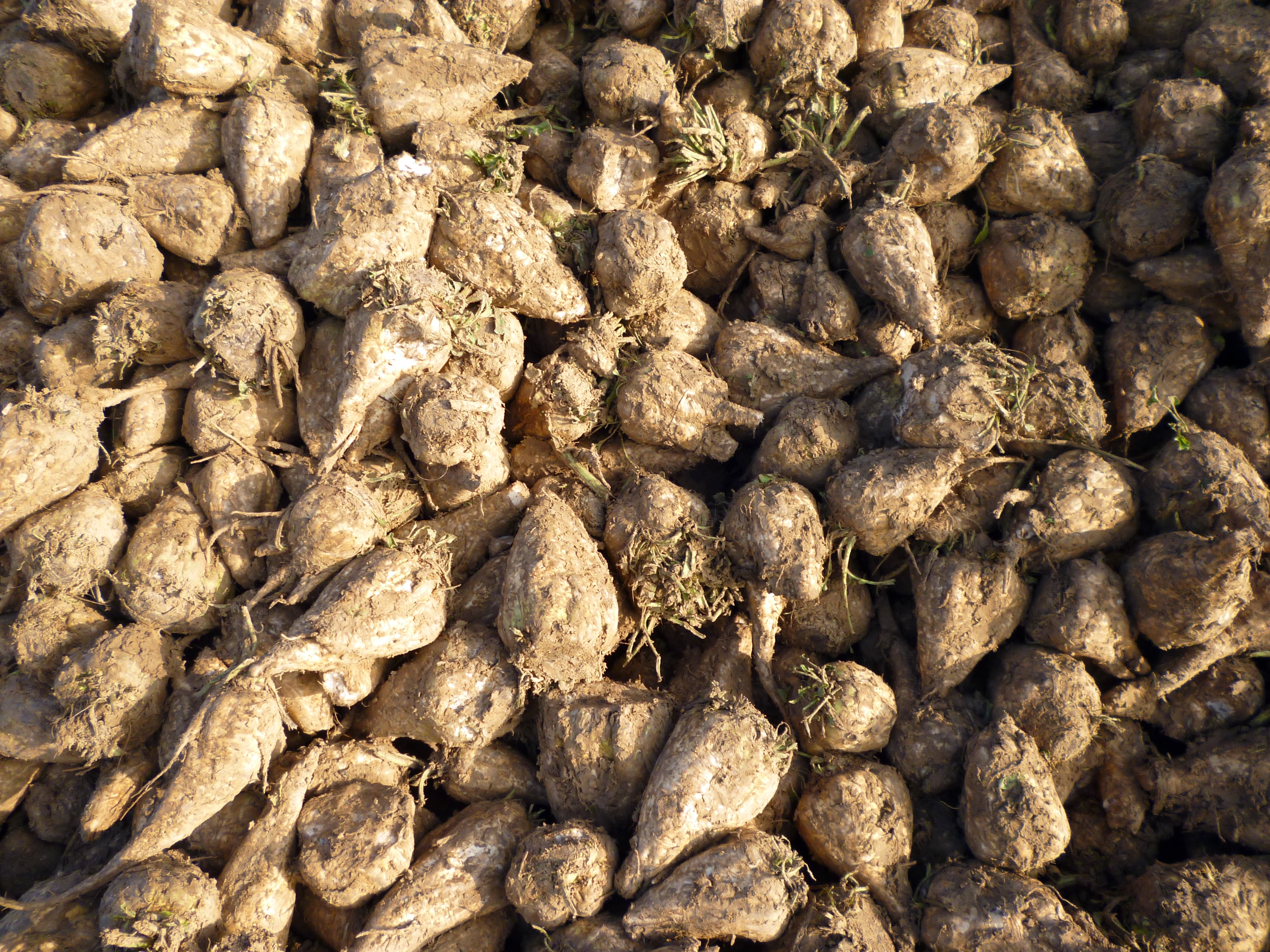
Sugar beets

A royal decree led to the first factory devoted to sugar extraction from beetroots being opened in Kunern, Silesia (now Konary, Poland) in 1801. The Silesian sugar beet was soon introduced to France where Napoleon opened schools specifically for studying the plant. He also ordered that 28,000 hectares (69,000 acres) be devoted to growing the new sugar beet. This was in response to British blockades of cane sugar during the Napoleonic Wars, which ultimately stimulated the rapid growth of a European sugar beet industry. By 1840 about 5% of the world's sugar was derived from sugar beets, and by 1880 this number had risen more than tenfold to over 50%. The sugar beet was introduced to North America after 1830 with the first commercial production starting in 1879 at a farm in Alvarado, California. The sugar beet was also introduced to Chile via German settlers around 1850.

It remains a widely cultivated commercial crop for producing table sugar, in part due to subsidies scaled to keep it competitive with tropical sugar cane.
