= Carlos Relvas =

Portuguese photography pioneer and sportsman

Carlos Relvas ComNSC
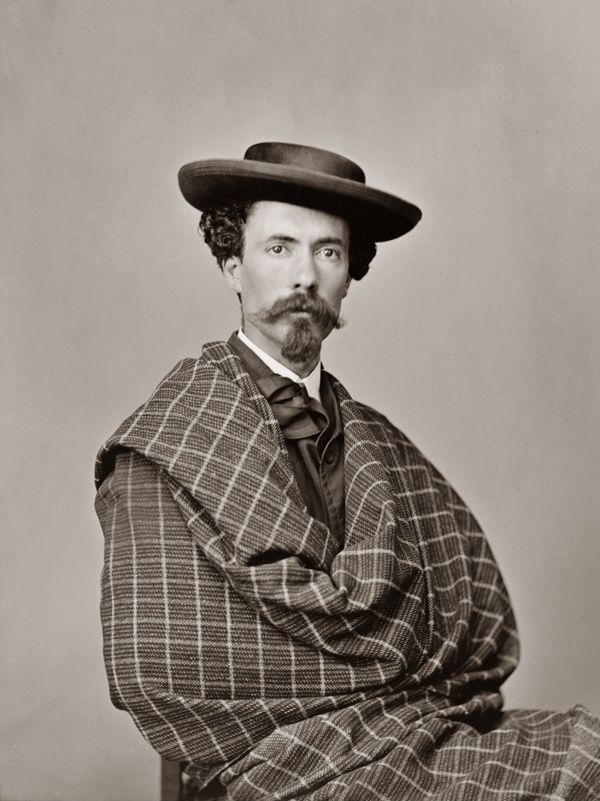
- Relvas, self-portrait (c. 1868-9)
- Born: Carlos Augusto de Mascarenhas Relvas de Campos; 13 November 1838; Golegã, Kingdom of Portugal
- Died: 23 January 1894 (aged 55); Golegã, Kingdom of Portugal
- Occupations: Photographer, cavaleiro

Carlos Augusto de Mascarenhas Relvas de Campos ComNSC (13 November 1838 – 23 January 1894), more commonly known simply as Carlos Relvas, was a wealthy Portuguese landowner, and sportsman. He is perhaps best known as a talented amateur bullfighter, and as a pioneer of photography in Portugal.

== Biography ==
Carlos Relvas was born in the Outeiro Palace, in Golegã, a small village in the rural province of Ribatejo in Portugal. His father, José Farinha Relvas de Campos was one of the wealthiest landowners in Ribatejo. He was educated by private tutors in science and foreign languages, particularly French.

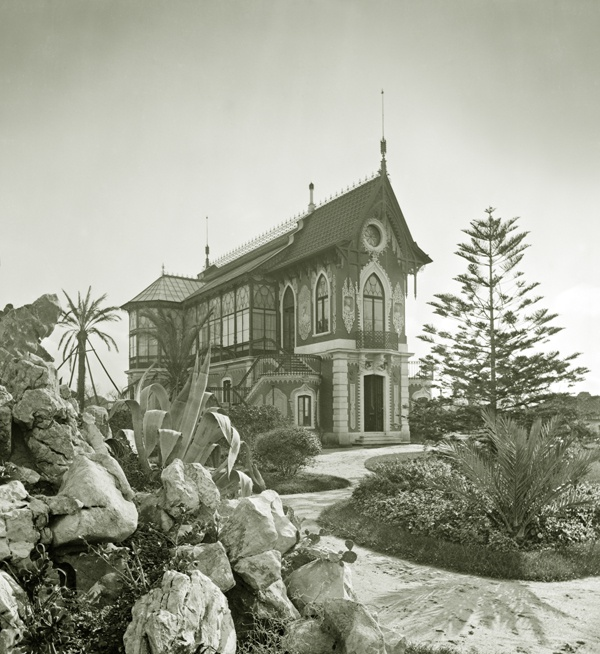
Carlos Relvas's photographic studio, in the 1870s

Relvas inherited a large fortune and extensive land from his parents. One biography notes his reputation for making charitable donations with his wealth.

As an aspiring artist of independent means, he soon turned to photography. In 1876, he had an opulent atelier built in one of his properties in Golegã, and bought modern photographic apparatuses from all over Europe. His photographic works became well known in Portugal, and he gained a reputation as an accomplished amateur. He became a member of the Société française de photographie, and many of his photographs were showcased in exhibitions in Portugal and abroad. He won the following prizes:

- Progress Medal (Vienna, 1873)
- Silver Medal (Madrid, 1873)
- Silver Medal (Vienna Photographic Society, 1875)
- Medal (Philadelphia, 1876)
- First Prize (Amsterdam, 1876)
- Gold Medal (Horticultural Exhibition at the Crystal Palace of Oporto, 1877)
- Gold Medal (Exhibition of the Union centrale des Arts décoratifs, Palais de l'Industrie, Paris)

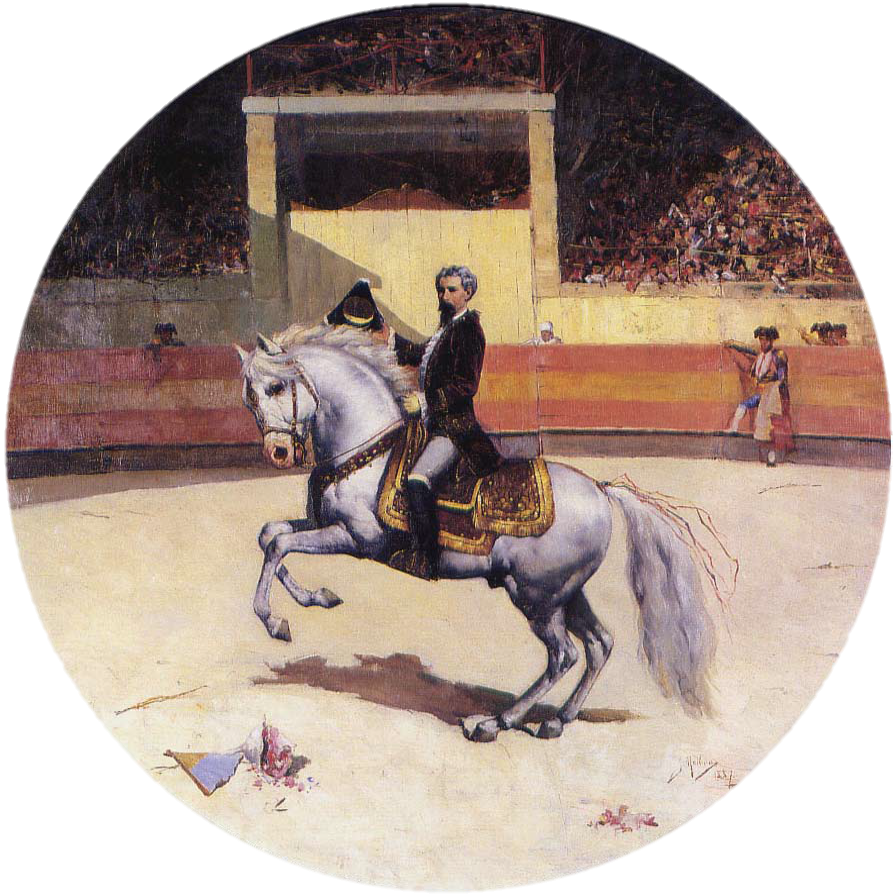
Carlos Relvas bullfighting on horseback, on an 1887 painting by José Malhoa

Relvas also became a notable marksman, fencer, and horse rider. He also became an amateur bullfighter, both as a cavaleiro (on horseback) and as a bandarilheiro. He had a bullring built in Golegã, and frequently took part in bullfighting spectacles for charity. Profits from the opening performance of the Golegã arena were donated to the local hospital, and his last performance was a benefit for the victims of the 1893 Azores hurricane.

In 1853, at age 15, Carlos Relvas married D. Margarida Amália Mendes de Vasconcelos, the daughter of the Count of Podentes, of an illustrious family in Beira Alta. They had four children. Their son José Relvas became a republican politician who actively participated in the 5 October 1910 revolution, and who briefly served as the country's Prime Minister in 1919. Their daughter, Margarida Relvas, also had a brief career as a noted photographer.

Relvas was married twice. His first wife Margarida died in 1887. One year later, he married Mariana Correia, who was not accepted by the entirety of his family. The couple moved to Relvas's photographic studio, now repurposed as a house, where they lived until Relvas's death. Carlos Relvas died on 23 January 1894, after contracting sepsis following a horse-riding accident.
