= Chard =

Green leafy vegetable

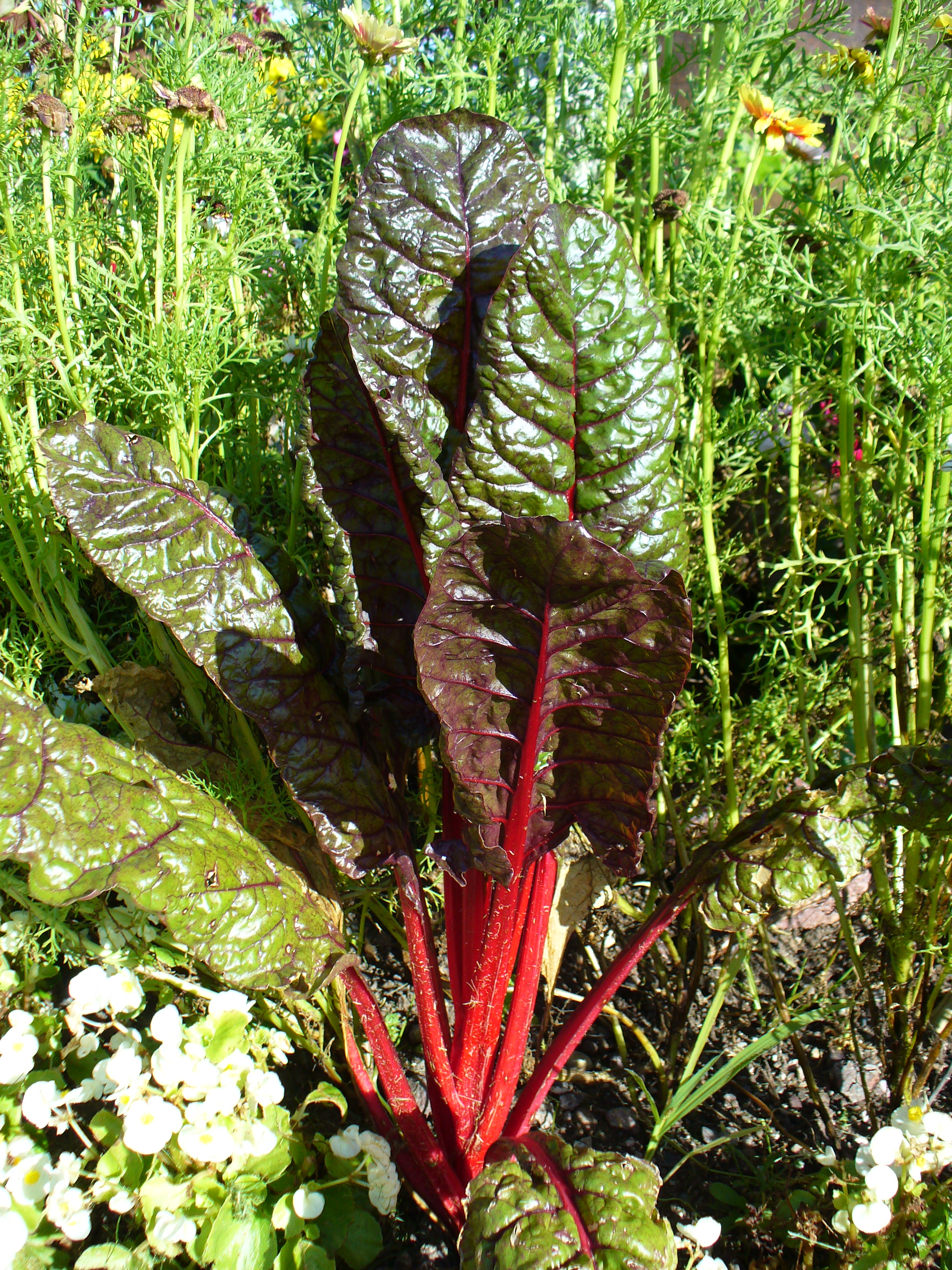
- Red-stemmed chard
- Species: Beta vulgaris
- Subspecies: Beta vulgaris subsp. vulgaris
- Cultivar group: Cicla Group, Flavescens Group
- Origin: Sea beet (Beta vulgaris subsp. maritima)
- Cultivar group members: Many; see text.

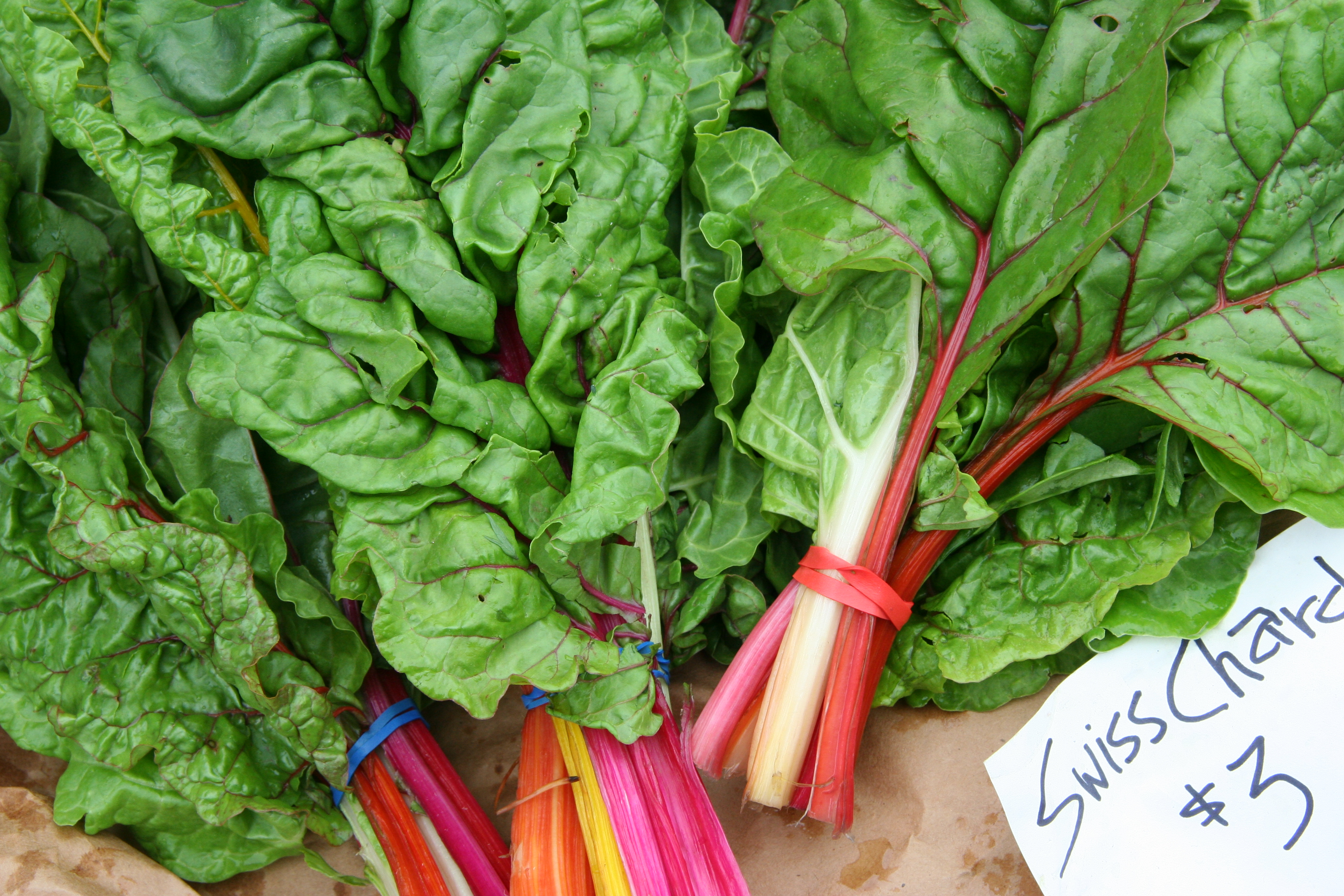
Swiss chard for sale at an outdoor market

Chard (/tʃɑːrd/; Beta vulgaris subsp. vulgaris, Cicla Group and Flavescens Group) is a green leafy vegetable. It is also called silver beet, perpetual spinach, beet spinach, seakale beet, and leaf beet, but because it is the same species as beetroot, these other common names may overlap.

In the cultivars of the Flavescens Group, or Swiss chard, the leaf stalks are large and often prepared separately from the leaf blade; the Cicla Group is the leafier spinach beet. The leaf blade can be green or reddish; the leaf stalks are usually white, yellow or red. Chard, like other green leafy vegetables, has highly nutritious leaves. Chard has been used in cooking for centuries.

== Taxonomy ==
=== Classification ===
Chard was first described in 1753 by Carl Linnaeus as Beta vulgaris var. cicla. Its taxonomic rank has changed many times: it has been treated as a subspecies, a convariety, and a variety of Beta vulgaris. (Among the numerous synonyms for it are Beta vulgaris subsp. cicla (L.) W.D.J. Koch (Cicla Group), B. vulgaris subsp. cicla (L.) W.D.J. Koch var. cicla L., B. vulgaris var. cycla (L.) Ulrich, B. vulgaris subsp. vulgaris (Leaf Beet Group), B. vulgaris subsp. vulgaris (Spinach Beet Group), B. vulgaris subsp. cicla (L.) W.D.J. Koch (Flavescens Group), B. vulgaris subsp. cicla (L.) W.D.J. Koch var. flavescens (Lam.) DC., B. vulgaris L. subsp. vulgaris (Leaf Beet Group), B. vulgaris subsp. vulgaris (Swiss Chard Group)). The accepted name for all beet cultivars, like chard, sugar beet and beetroot, is Beta vulgaris subsp. vulgaris. They are cultivated descendants of the sea beet, Beta vulgaris subsp. maritima. Chard belongs to the chenopods, which are now mostly included in the family Amaranthaceae (sensu lato).

The two rankless cultivar groups for chard are the Cicla Group for the leafy spinach beet and the Flavescens Group for the stalky Swiss chard.

=== Etymology ===
The word "chard" descends from the 14th-century French carde, from Latin carduus meaning artichoke thistle (or cardoon which also includes the artichoke) itself.

The origin of the adjective "Swiss" is unclear. Some attribute the name to it having been first described by a Swiss botanist, either Gaspard Bauhin or Karl Koch (although the latter was German, not Swiss). Be that as it may, chard is used in Swiss cuisine, e.g., in the traditional dish capuns from the canton of Grisons.

== Cultivation ==
Chard is a biennial. Clusters of chard seeds are usually sown, in the Northern Hemisphere, between June and October, the exact time depending on the desired harvesting period. Chard can be harvested while the leaves are young and tender, or after maturity when they are larger and have slightly tougher stems. Harvesting is a continual process, as most species of chard produce three or more crops.

=== Cultivars ===
Cultivars of chard include green forms, such as 'Lucullus' and 'Fordhook Giant', as well as red-ribbed forms, such as 'Ruby Chard' and 'Rhubarb Chard'. The red-ribbed forms are attractive in the garden, but as a general rule, the older green forms tend to outproduce the colorful hybrids. 'Rainbow Chard' is a mix of colored varieties often mistaken for a single variety.

Chard has shiny, green, ribbed leaves, with petioles that range in color from white to yellow to red, depending on the cultivar.

Chard may be harvested in the garden all summer by cutting individual leaves as needed. In the Northern Hemisphere, chard is typically ready to harvest as early as April and lasts until there is a hard frost, typically below −4 °C (25 °F). It is one of the hardier leafy greens, with a harvest season that typically lasts longer than that of kale, spinach, or baby greens.

Swiss chard, cooked, no salt
Nutritional value per 100 g (3.5 oz)
- Energy: 84 kJ (20 kcal)
- Carbohydrates: 4.13 g
- Sugars: 1.1 g
- Dietary fiber: 2.1 g
- Fat: 0.08 g
- Protein: 1.88 g
Vitamins and minerals
Vitamins	Quantity %DV^{†}
Vitamin A equiv. beta-Carotene lutein zeaxanthin	34% 306 μg 34% 3652 μg 11015 μg
Vitamin A	6124 IU
Thiamine (B1)	3% 0.034 mg
Riboflavin (B2)	7% 0.086 mg
Niacin (B3)	2% 0.36 mg
Pantothenic acid (B5)	3% 0.163 mg
Vitamin B6	5% 0.085 mg
Folate (B9)	2% 9 μg
Choline	5% 28.7 mg
Vitamin C	20% 18 mg
Vitamin E	13% 1.89 mg
Vitamin K	273% 327.3 μg
Minerals	Quantity %DV^{†}
Calcium	4% 58 mg
Iron	13% 2.26 mg
Magnesium	20% 86 mg
Manganese	15% 0.334 mg
Phosphorus	3% 33 mg
Potassium	18% 549 mg
Sodium	8% 179 mg
Zinc	3% 0.33 mg
- Other constituents: Quantity
- Water: 92.65 g
- Full Link to USDA Database entry
- ^{†}Percentages estimated using US recommendations for adults, except for potassium, which is estimated based on expert recommendation from the National Academies.

== Uses ==
=== Culinary ===
Fresh chard can be used raw in salads, stirfries, soups or omelets. The raw leaves can be used like a tortilla wrap. Chard leaves and stalks are typically boiled or sautéed; the bitterness fades with cooking.

Chard is one of the most common ingredients of Croatian cuisine in the Dalmatia region, being known as "queen of the Dalmatian garden" and used in various ways (boiled, in stews, in Soparnik, etc.).

=== Nutrition ===
In a 100-gram (3.5 oz) serving, raw Swiss chard provides 84 kilojoules (20 kcal) of food energy and has rich content (> 19% of the Daily Value, DV) of vitamins A, K, and C, with 122%, 1038%, and 50%, respectively, of the DV. Also having significant content in raw chard are dietary fiber and the dietary minerals magnesium, manganese, iron, and potassium. Raw chard has a low content of carbohydrates, protein, and fat.

Cooked chard is 93% water, 4% carbohydrates, 2% protein, and contains negligible fat. In a reference 100 g serving, cooked chard supplies 20 calories, with vitamin and mineral contents reduced compared to raw chard, but still present in significant proportions of the DV, especially for vitamin A, vitamin K, vitamin C, and magnesium (see table).

Swiss chard has a very high oxalate content, one of the highest among edible vegetables. 100 grams of fresh leaves contain 480 mg of oxalates, of which about a half is in soluble form. High oxalate intake has been linked to many diseases such as kidney stones formation, cardiovascular disease, and osteoporosis.

== In culture ==
In the Babylonian Talmud, a foundational Jewish text from late antiquity, chard is praised for its health benefits. In tractate Eruvin 29a, it is said that a cooked dish of chard "is good for the heart and good for the eyes, and all the more so for the intestines." In another passage, Berakhot 44b, it states: "Cabbage for food, mangold for medicine."
