= Beeturia =

Discoloration of urine after consuming beetroot

Betanin, a beet pigment causing urine coloring

Beeturia is the passing of red or pink urine after eating beetroots or foods colored with beetroot extract or beetroot betalain pigments. The color is caused by the excretion of the betalain pigments, such as betanin.

The coloring is highly variable between individuals and between different feeding occasions, and can vary in intensity from light pink urine to strongly-colored deep red urine. The condition is benign and dissipates promptly with avoidance of beet foods. Beeturia occurs in about 10-14% of the public, with higher frequency and intensity occurring in people with iron deficiency, pernicious anemia or digestive diseases.

The pigment is sensitive to oxidative degradation under strongly acidic conditions. Therefore, the urine coloring depends on stomach acidity and dwell time, as well as the presence in foods of betalain-protecting substances, such as oxalic acid.

Beeturia is often associated with red or pink feces due to unabsorbed pigments ending up in feces.

== Cause ==
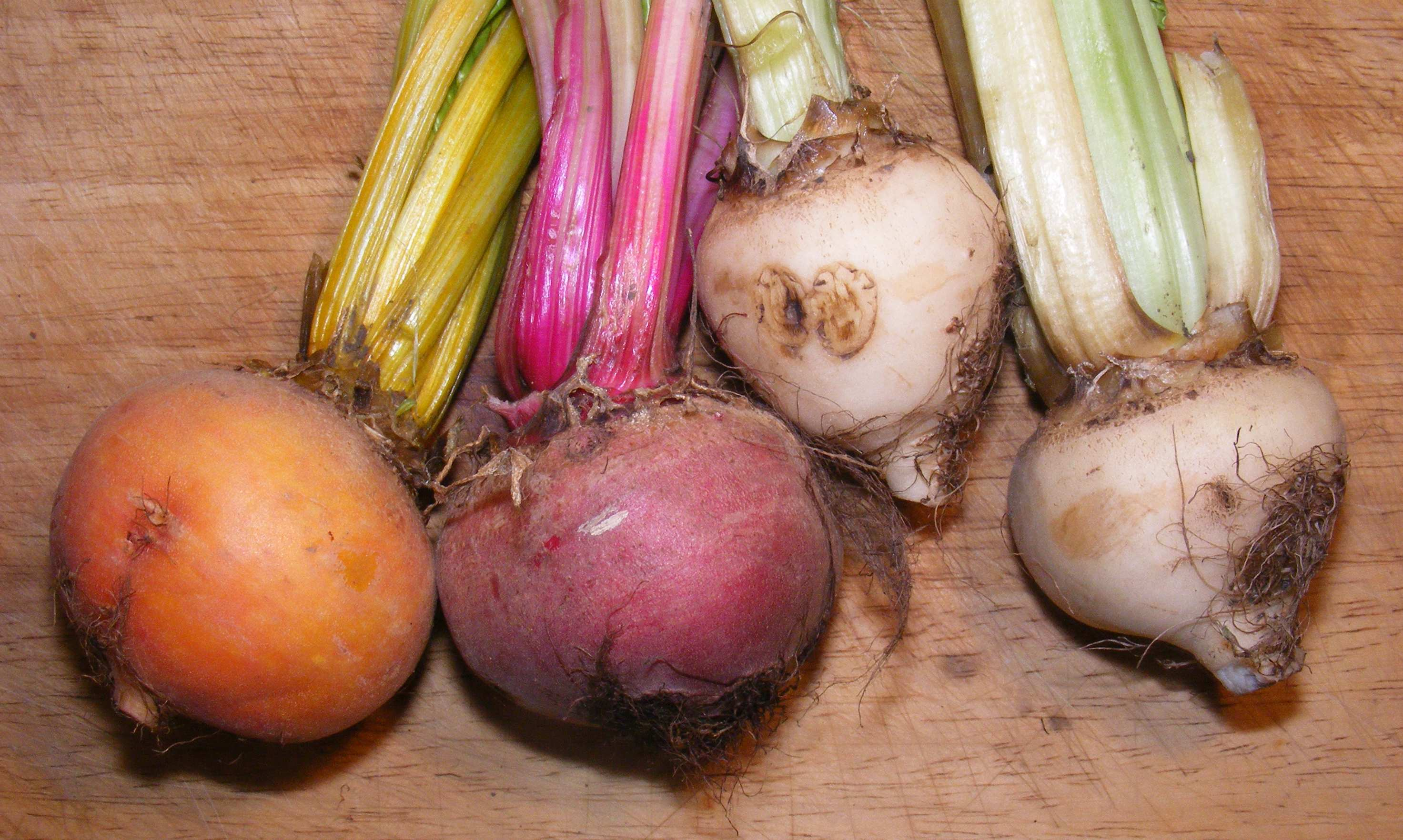
A selection of differently colored beetroot varieties

The red color seen in beeturia is caused by the presence of unmetabolized betalain pigments such as betanin in beetroot passed through the body. The pigments are absorbed in the colon. Betalains are oxidation-sensitive redox indicators that are decolorized by hydrochloric acid, ferric ions, and colonic bacteria preparations. The gut flora play a not-yet-evaluated role in the breakdown of the pigment.

== Differential diagnosis ==
The incidence of beeturia increases in people with pernicious anemia and iron deficiency. There is no known relation to deficiencies in liver metabolism or removal from the body by the kidneys. There is no known direct genetic influence, and no single gene variant, that differentiates excreters from non-excreters.

== Factors ==
The extent of excreted pigment depends on the beet pigment content of the meal, including the addition of concentrated beetroot extract as a food additive to certain processed foods. Storage conditions of the beet foods, including light, heat, and oxygen exposure, and repeated freeze-thaw cycles could degrade the beet pigments. Stomach acidity and dwell time may affect urine color intensity. The presence of beet pigment-protecting substances, such as oxalic acid, in the meal and during intestinal passage, increase the color intensity in the urine. Medications may affect stomach acidity, such as proton pump inhibitors, thereby affecting urine color.

== See also ==
- Porphyria, a group of disorders that may cause reddish urine
- Blue diaper syndrome
