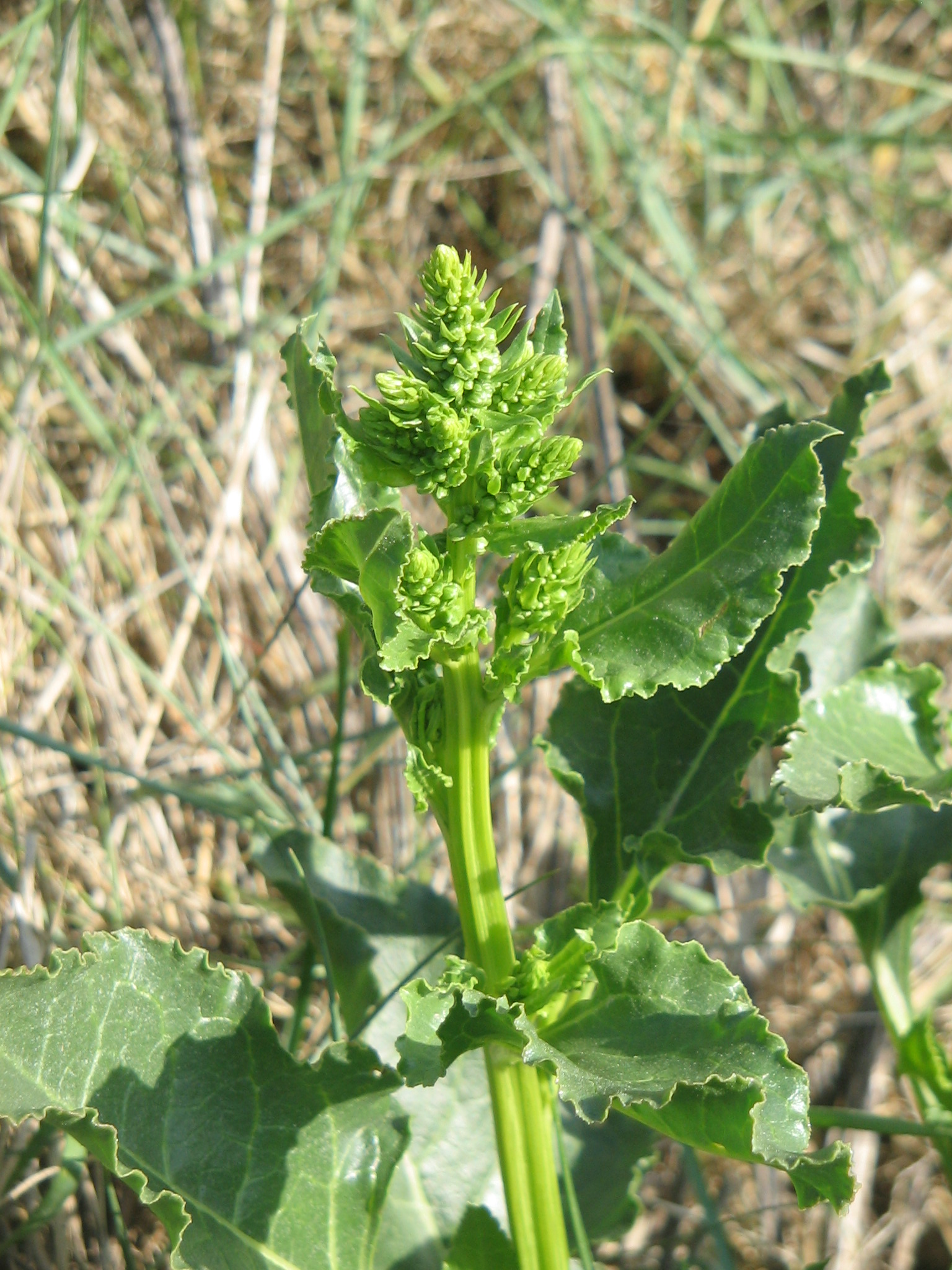

Scientific classification
- Kingdom: Plantae
- Clade: Tracheophytes
- Clade: Angiosperms
- Clade: Eudicots
- Order: Caryophyllales
- Family: Amaranthaceae
- Genus: Beta
- Species: B. vulgaris
- Subspecies: B. v. subsp. maritima

Trinomial name
- Beta vulgaris subsp. maritima (L.) Arcang.

= Sea beet =

Subspecies of beet (terrestrial)

The sea beet, Beta vulgaris subsp. maritima (L.) Arcangeli., is an Old World perennial plant with edible leaves, leading to the common name wild spinach.

== Description ==
Sea beet is an erect and sprawling perennial plant up to 80 centimetres (31 in) high with dark green, leathery, untoothed, shiny leaves. The lower leaves are wavy and roughly triangular while the upper leaves are narrow and oval. Blooming in summer, the inflorescence is borne on a thick, fleshy grooved stem in a leafy spike. The individual flowers are hermaphroditic, green and tiny with the sepals thickening and hardening around the fruits. They are wind-pollinated.

Leaves

Close-up of leaf

== Taxonomy ==
The species was previously of the Chenopodiaceae. Carl Linnaeus first described Beta vulgaris in 1753; in the second edition of Species Plantarum in 1762, he divided the species into wild and cultivated varieties, giving the name Beta maritima to the wild taxon.

The sea beet is the wild ancestor of common vegetables such as beetroot, sugar beet, and Swiss chard.

== Distribution and habitat ==
Sea beet is found in maritime locations in Europe, northern Africa, and southern Asia. In the British Isles it is found round the coasts of England, Wales, Ireland and southern Scotland. It grows at the top of sand and pebble beaches, at the drift-line on saltmarshes, on sea-walls, coastal rocks and cliffs. It also occurs on wasteland near the sea, and occasionally on rubbish tips and roadsides inland. On the pebble banks of Chesil Beach in Dorset, it dominates the drift-line along with oraches Atriplex spp., and is in dynamic equilibrium with a community dominated by shrubby sea-blite Suaeda vera.

It requires moist, well-drained soils, and does not tolerate shade. However, it is able to tolerate relatively high levels of sodium in its environment.

== Uses ==
Its leaves have a pleasant texture and taste, being good served raw or cooked (minus the tough stems), similar to spinach.
