= Tungi =

Tungi may refer to:

- Tungi, in Saint Helena a local name for the prickly or cactus pear Opuntia ficus-indica
- Tungi Spirit, an alcoholic beverage produced on Saint Helena from the fermented fruits of this plant
- Tongi, Bangladesh
- Tung Fort, Pune District, India
- Tungi, Bihar, a village in Nalanda district in Bihar, India
- Viliami Tungī Mailefihi (1888–1941), Tongan high chieftain and Prince Consort
- Prince Tungi Tongan Prince
