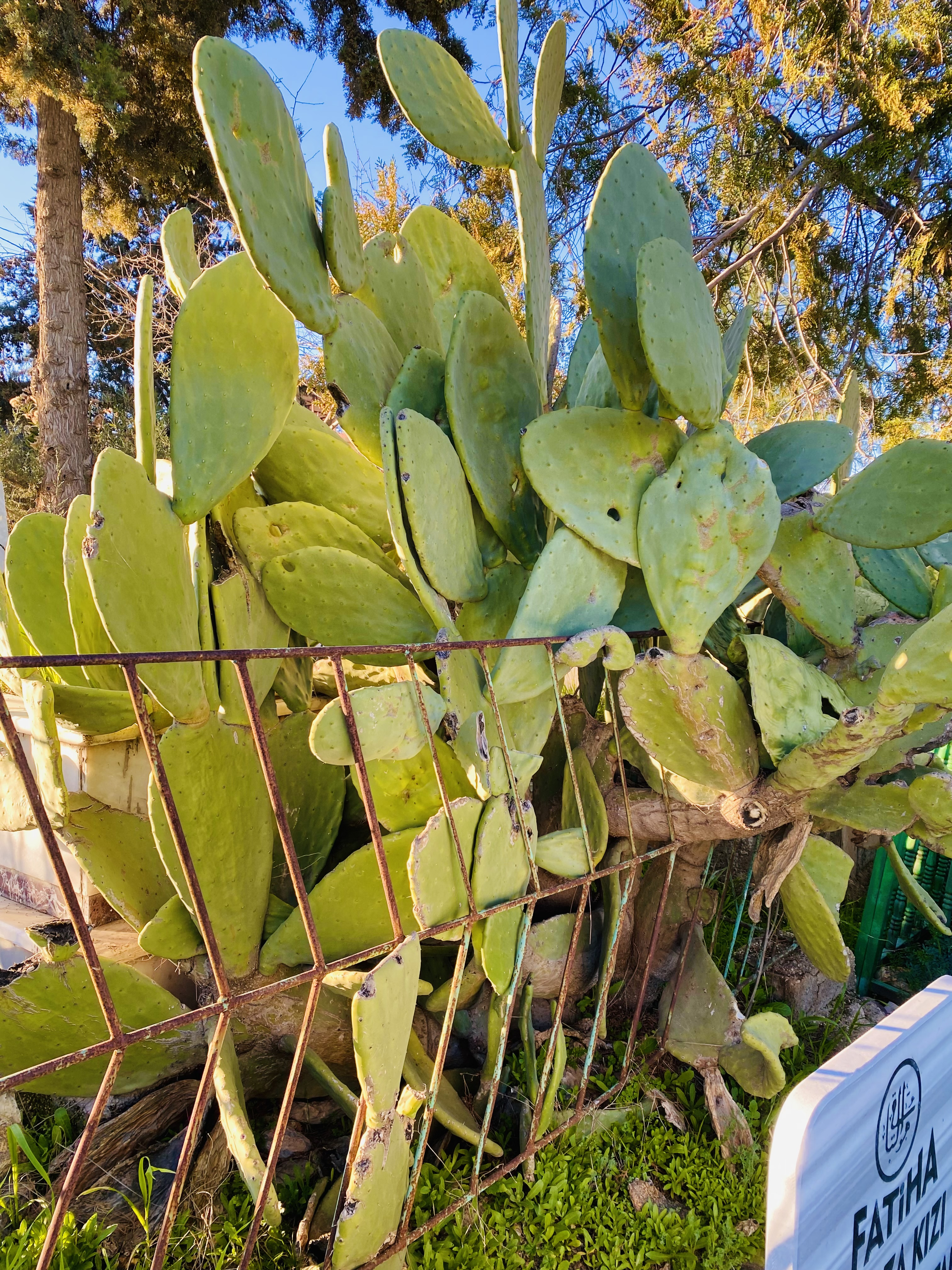
- In Gaziantep, Turkey

Conservation status
- Data Deficient (IUCN 3.1)

Scientific classification
- Kingdom: Plantae
- Clade: Embryophytes
- Clade: Tracheophytes
- Clade: Angiosperms
- Clade: Eudicots
- Order: Caryophyllales
- Family: Cactaceae
- Genus: Opuntia
- Species: O. ficus-indica

Binomial name
- Opuntia ficus-indica (L.) Mill.

Synonyms
- Cactus decumanus Willd.; Nopal Willd.; Cactus ficus-indica L.; Opuntia amyclaea Ten.; Opuntia cordobensis Speg.; Opuntia decumana (Willd.) Haw.; Opuntia ficus-barbarica A.Berger; Opuntia gymnocarpa F.A.C.Weber; Opuntia hispanica Griffiths; Opuntia maxima Mill.; Opuntia megacantha Salm-Dyck; Opuntia paraguayensis K.Schum.

= Opuntia ficus-indica =

Species of cactus

Opuntia ficus-indica, the Indian fig opuntia, fig opuntia, or prickly pear, is a species of cactus that has long been a domesticated crop plant grown in agricultural economies throughout arid and semiarid parts of the world. O. ficus-indica is the most widespread and most commercially important cactus. It is grown primarily as a fruit crop, and also for the vegetable nopales and other uses. Cacti are good crops for dry areas because they efficiently convert water into biomass. O. ficus-indica is the most widespread of the long-domesticated cactuses. Opuntia species hybridize easily, but the wild origin of O. ficus-indica is likely to have been in central Mexico, where its closest genetic relatives are found.

== Names ==
Most culinary references to the "prickly pear" refer to this species. The Spanish name tuna is also used for the fruit of this cactus and for Opuntia in general; according to Alexander von Humboldt, it was a word of Taino origin taken into the Spanish language around 1500.

Common English names for the plant and its fruit are Indian fig opuntia, Barbary fig, cactus pear, prickly pear, and spineless cactus, among many others. In Mexican Spanish, the plant is called nopal, a name that may be used in American English as culinary terms. Peninsular Spanish mostly uses higo chumbo for the fruit and chumbera for the plant.

In Greek, the plant is called φραγκοσυκιά and the fruit φραγκόσυκο, literally "Frankish fig", a label historically applied to foreign produce. In Cyprus, the fruits are commonly known as παπουτσόσυκα and the plant as παπουτσοσυκιά; the name is glossed in Cypriot dialect sources and popularly explained as "shoe figs" in reference to the thick, shoe-like pads.

== Description ==
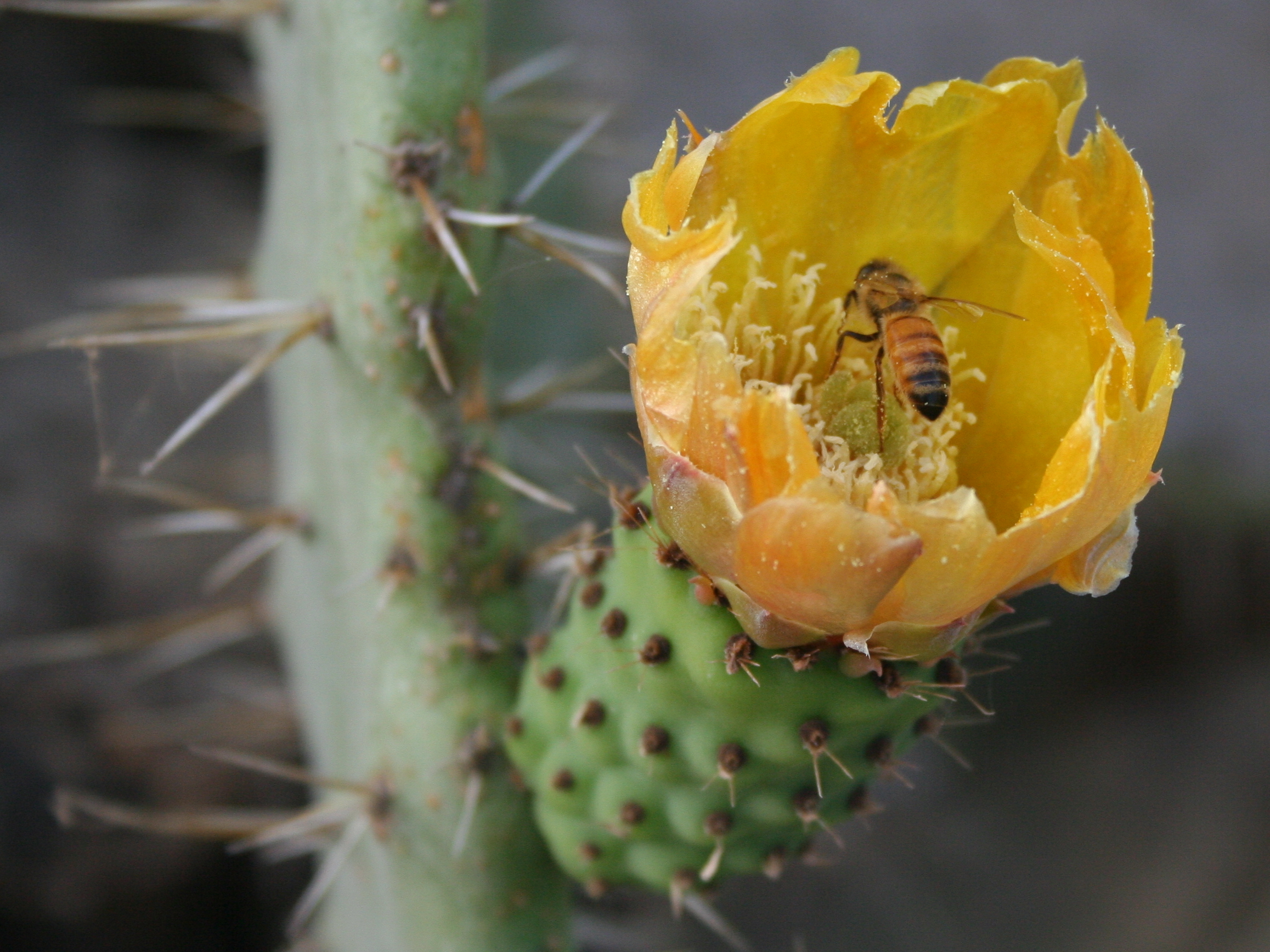
Flower

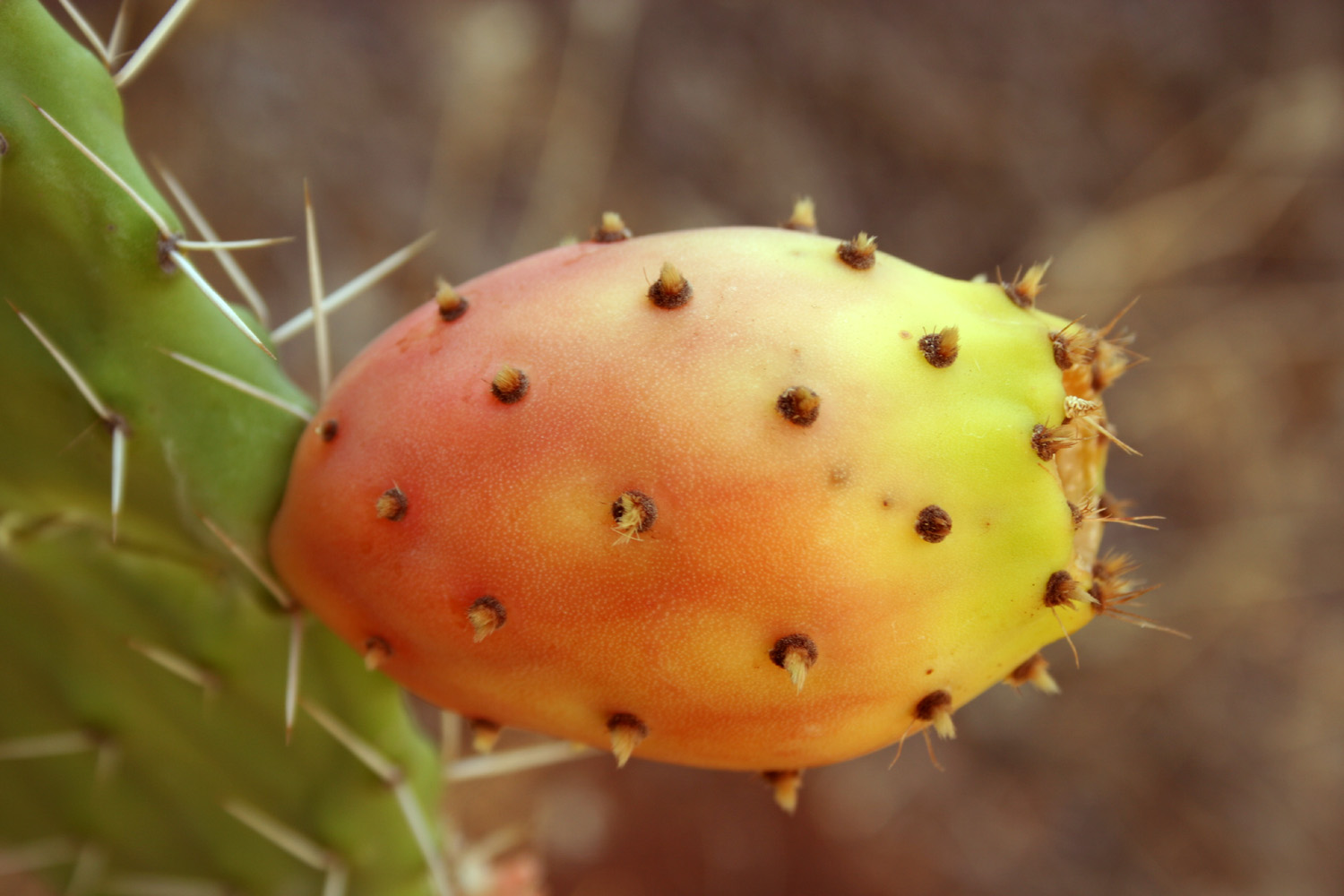
Fruit

O. ficus-indica is polyploid, hermaphroditic, and autogamous. As Opuntia species grow in semiarid environments, the main limiting factor in their environment is water. They have developed several adaptations to dry conditions, notably succulence.

A perennial shrub, O. ficus-indica can grow up to 5 m in height, with thick, succulent, and oblong to spatulate stems called cladodes. It has a water-repellent and sun-reflecting waxy epidermis. Cladodes 1–2 years old produce flowers, with the fruit's colours ranging from pale green to deep red.

The plants flower in three distinct colours: white, yellow, and red. The flowers first appear in early May through the early summer in the Northern Hemisphere, and the fruits ripen from August through October. The fruits are typically eaten, minus the thick outer skin, after chilling in a refrigerator for a few hours. They have a taste similar to sweet watermelon. The bright red/purple or white/yellowish flesh contains many tiny hard seeds that are usually swallowed but should be avoided by those who have problems digesting seeds.

== Uses ==
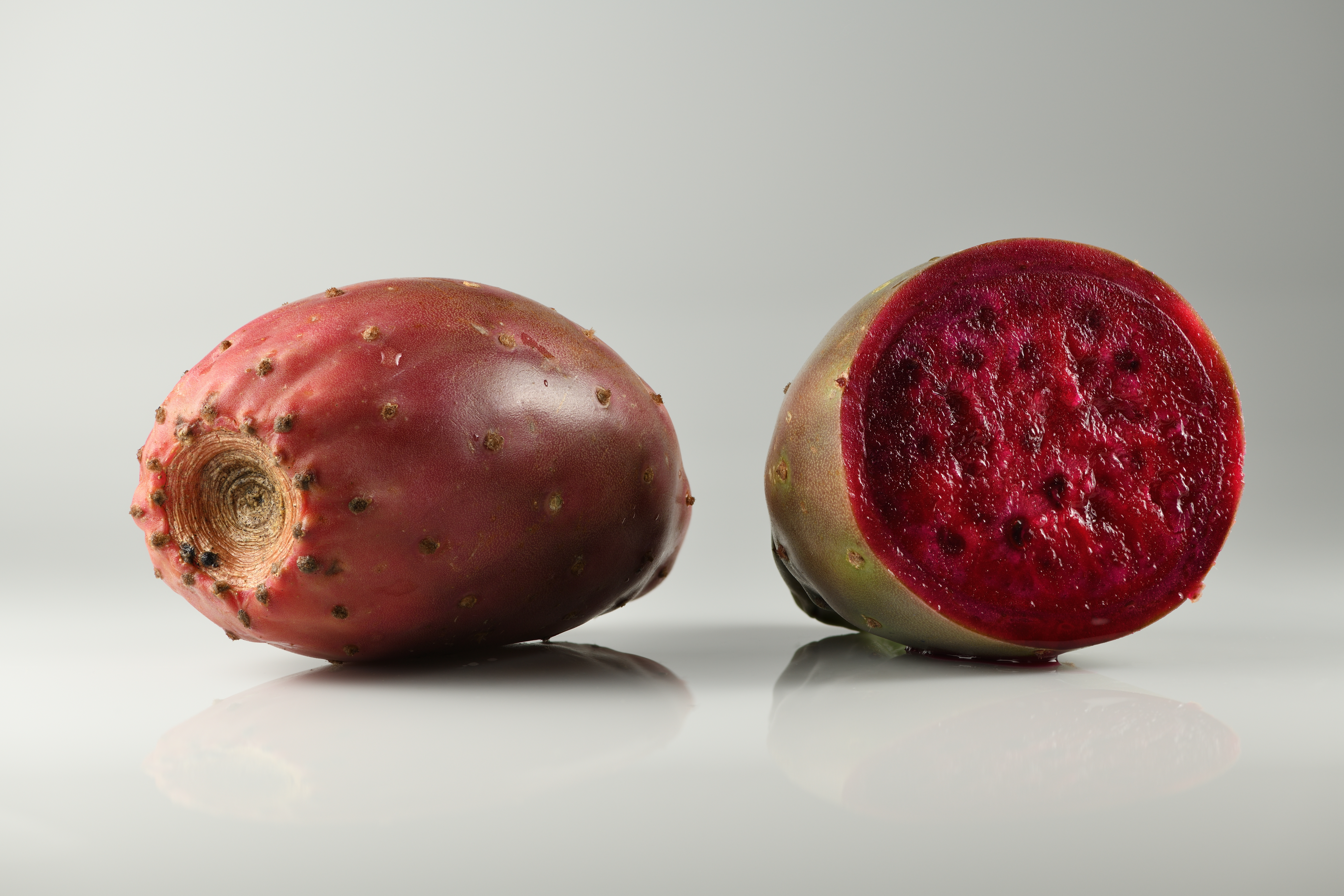
Fruit as food

=== Human consumption ===
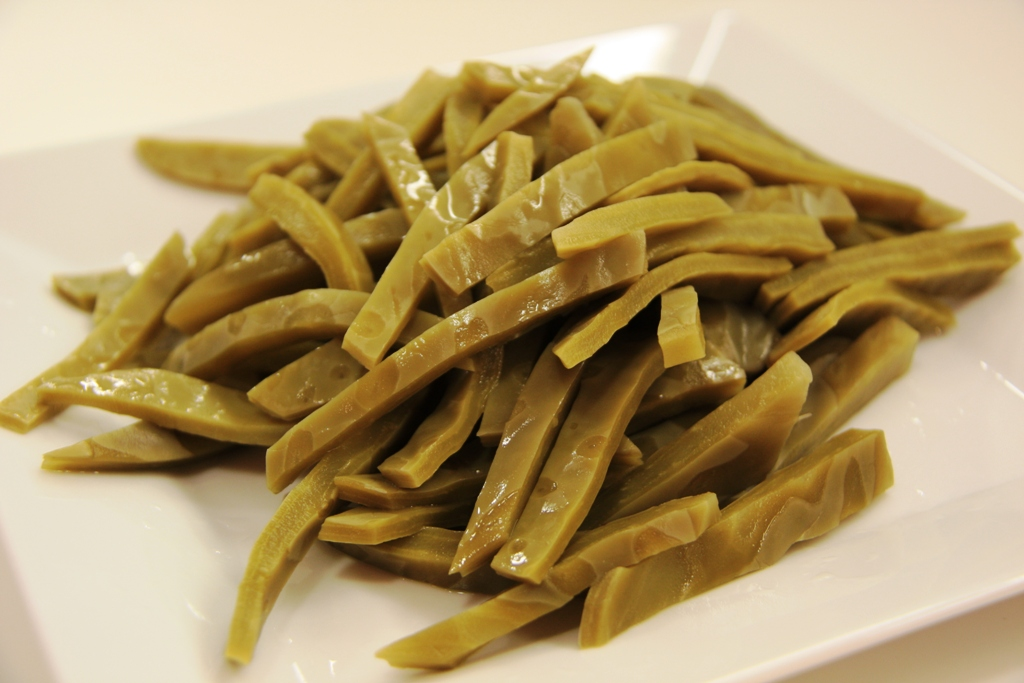
Sliced nopales

O. ficus-indica is consumed widely as food. The fruits are commercialized in many parts of the world, eaten raw, and have one of the highest concentrations of vitamin C of any fruit. The young "leaves" (actually cladodes, which technically are stems) are cooked and eaten as a vegetable known as nopalitos. They are sliced into strips, skinned or unskinned, and fried with eggs and jalapeños, served as a breakfast treat. They have a texture and flavor like green beans. The fruits or leaves can be boiled, used raw, or blended with fruit juice, cooked on a frying pan, used as a side dish with chicken, or added to tacos. Jams and jellies are produced from the fruit, which resemble strawberries and figs in color and flavor. Mexicans use Opuntia fruit to make an alcoholic drink called colonche.

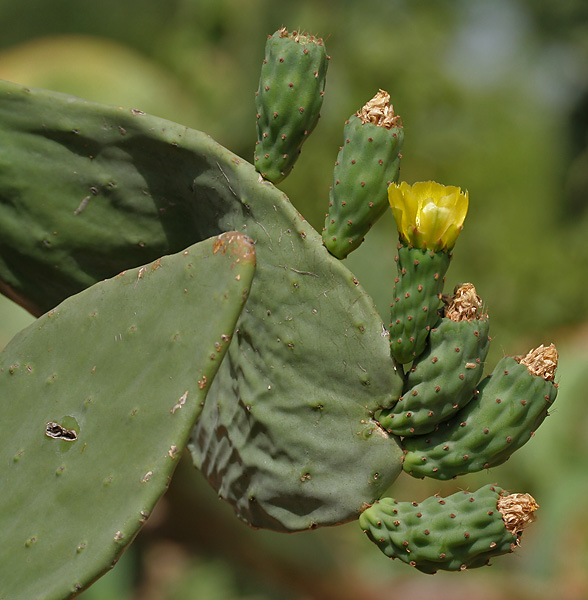
Flowering

In Sicily, a prickly pear-flavored liqueur called ficodi is produced, flavored somewhat like a medicinal aperitif. In Malta, a liqueur called bajtra (the Maltese name for prickly pear) is made from this fruit, which grows wild in almost every field. On the island of Saint Helena, the prickly pear also gives its name to locally distilled liqueur, Tungi Spirit.

=== Fodder ===
The cattle industry of the Southwest United States has begun to cultivate O. ficus-indica, both as a feed source for cattle and a boundary fence. Cattle are normally fed a spineless variety of the cactus. The cactus pads are low in dry matter and crude protein but useful as a supplement in drought conditions. In addition to the food value, the moisture content adequately eliminates watering the cattle during drought. Numerous wildlife species use the prickly pear for food. In severe drought years, the spines of wild prickly pear are sometimes burned off for emergency feed.

=== Soil erosion prevention ===
O. ficus-indica is planted in hedges to provide a cheap but effective erosion control in the Mediterranean basin. Under those hedges and adjacent areas, soil physical properties, nitrogen, and organic matter are considerably improved. The structural stability of the soil is enhanced, runoff and erosion are reduced, and water storage capacity and permeability are enhanced. Prickly pear plantations also positively impact the plant growth of other species by improving severe environmental conditions, which facilitate the colonization and development of herbaceous species.

O. ficus-indica is being advantageously used in Tunisia and Algeria to slow and direct sand movement and enhance the restoration of vegetative cover, thus minimizing deterioration of built terraces with its deep and strong rooting system.

=== Other ===
The plant may be used as an ingredient in adobe to bind and waterproof roofs. O. ficus-indica (as well as other species in Opuntia and Nopalea) is cultivated in nopalries to serve as a host plant for cochineal insects, which produce desirable red and purple dyes, a practice dating to the pre-Columbian era.

Mucilage from prickly pear may work as a natural, non-toxic dispersant for oil spills.

Mexico has a semicommercial pilot plant for biofuel production from Opuntia biomass, in operation since 2016.

== Cultivation ==
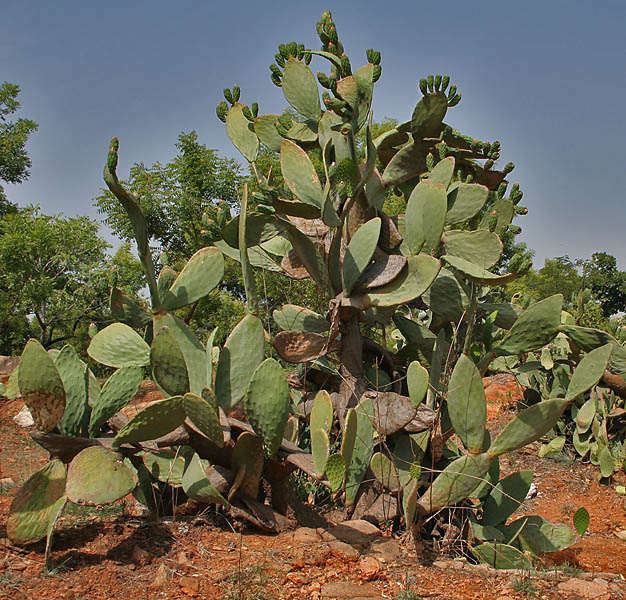
In Secunderabad, India

=== Distribution ===
Commercial use for O. ficus-indica is for the large, sweet fruits called tunas. An area with a significant tuna-growing cultivation is Mexico. The cactus grows wild and cultivated to heights of 12–16 feet (3.7–4.9 m). In Namibia, O. ficus-indica is a common drought-resistant fodder plant. O. ficus-indica grows in many frost-free areas of the world, including the Southern United States.

Prickly pears are a massive weed problem for some parts of Australia, especially southeast Queensland, some inland parts of New South Wales, Victoria, and south-eastern and eastern South Australia.

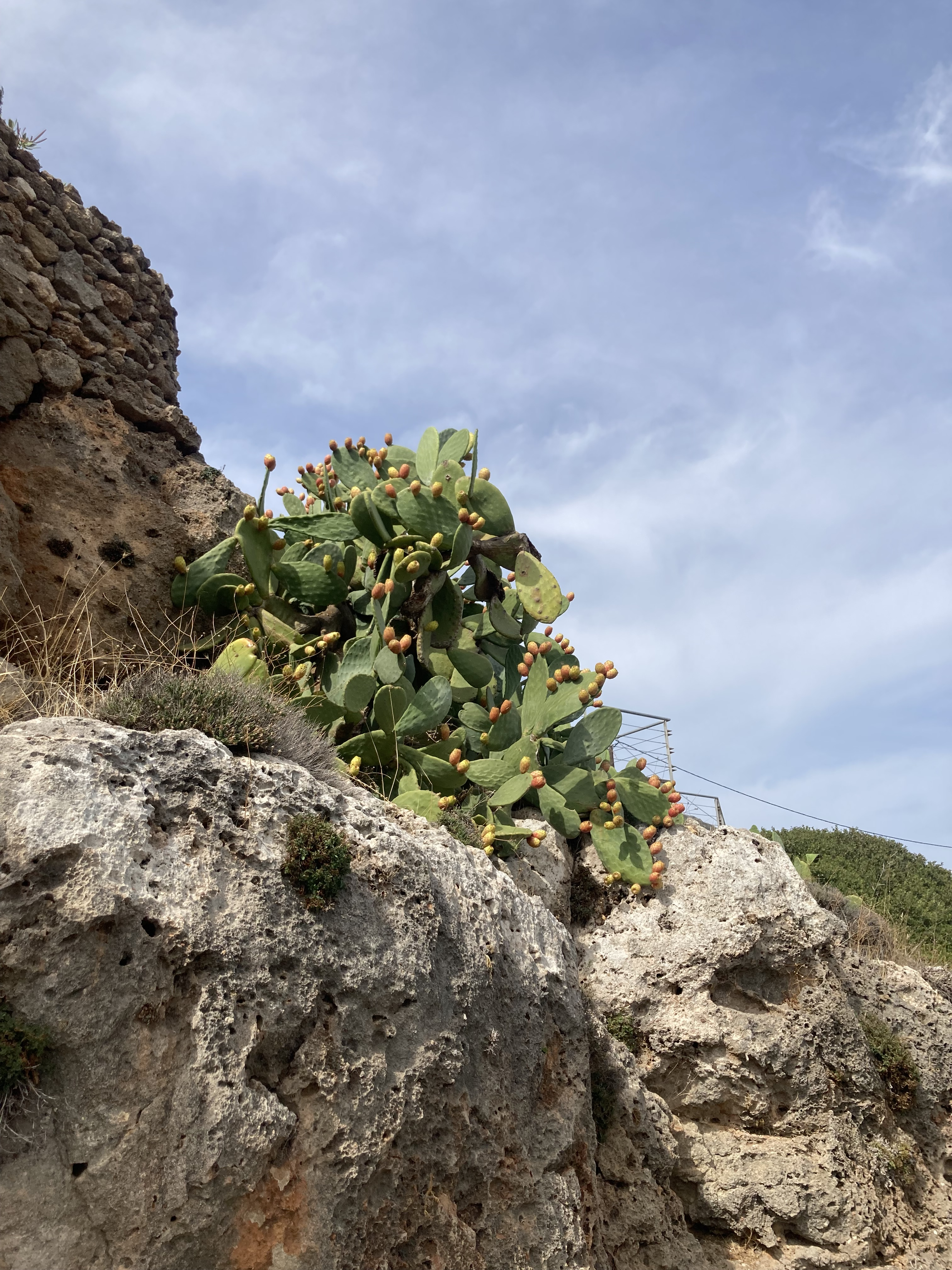
O. ficus-indica in Kythera, Greece

The plant is considered an invasive species in northern Africa.

=== Growth ===
Factors that limit the growth of prickly pear are rainfall, soil, atmospheric humidity, and temperature. Its minimum rainfall requirement is 200 mm per year as long as the soils are sandy and deep. The ideal growth conditions regarding rainfall are 200–400 mm (7.9–15.7 in) per year.

O. ficus-indica is sensitive to lack of oxygen in the root zone, requiring well-drained soils. It is similar to crassulacean acid metabolism species, which are not salt-tolerant in their root zone, and growth may cease under high salt concentration. O. ficus-indica usually grows in regions where relative humidity is above 60%, and saturation deficit occurs. It is absent in regions where less than 40% humidity occurs for more than a month. Mean daily temperature required to develop is at least 1.5–2.0 °C. At −10 to −12 °C, prickly pear growth is inhibited even if it is exposed to these temperatures only for a few minutes. The maximum temperature limit of prickly pear is above 50 °C.

=== Harvest and preparation ===
As the fruits of O. ficus-indica are delicate, they need to be carefully harvested by hand. The small spines on the fruits are removed by rubbing them on an abrasive surface or sweeping them through the grass. Before consumption, they are peeled.

The pads of the plant (mainly used as fodder) also must be harvested by hand. The pads are cut with a knife, detaching the pad from the plant in the joint. If O. ficus-indica is cultivated for forage production, spineless cultivars are preferred, but wild plants are also used as fodder. In these cases, the spines must be removed from the pads to avoid animal damage. Primarily, this is achieved by burning the spines off the pads.

== Nutrients and phytochemicals ==
O. ficus-indica for human and animal consumption is valuable for its water content in an arid environment, containing about 85% water as a water source for wildlife. The seeds contain 3–10% protein and 6–13% of fatty acids, mainly linoleic acid. However, the seeds contained in the fruits can be unpleasant to chew because of their hardness and can lead to constipation. For this reason, some agronomic studies in Italy and Mexico have focused on decreasing the seed content of Opuntia ficus-indica fruits.

As the fruit contains vitamin C (containing 25–30 mg per 100 g), it was once used to mitigate scurvy. Opuntia contains selenium.

The red color of the fruit and juice is due to betalains, (betanin and indicaxanthin). The plant also contains flavonoids, such as quercetin, isorhamnetin, and kaempferol.

== Biogeography ==
DNA analysis indicated O. ficus-indica was domesticated from Opuntia species native to central Mexico. The Codex Mendoza, and other early sources, show Opuntia cladodes, as well as cochineal dye (which must be cultivated on Opuntia), in Aztec tribute rolls. The plant spread to many parts of the Americas in pre-Columbian times. Since Columbus, it has spread to many parts of the world, especially the Mediterranean, where it has become naturalized.

== Cultural significance ==
The coat of arms of Mexico

The prickly pear appears in the coat of arms of Mexico which appears on the flag of Mexico. It is also the official plant of Texas by legislation from 1995. The plant is both an Israeli and Palestinian symbol. In Israel, the term sabra is a name for the plant and for Jews born in Israel.
