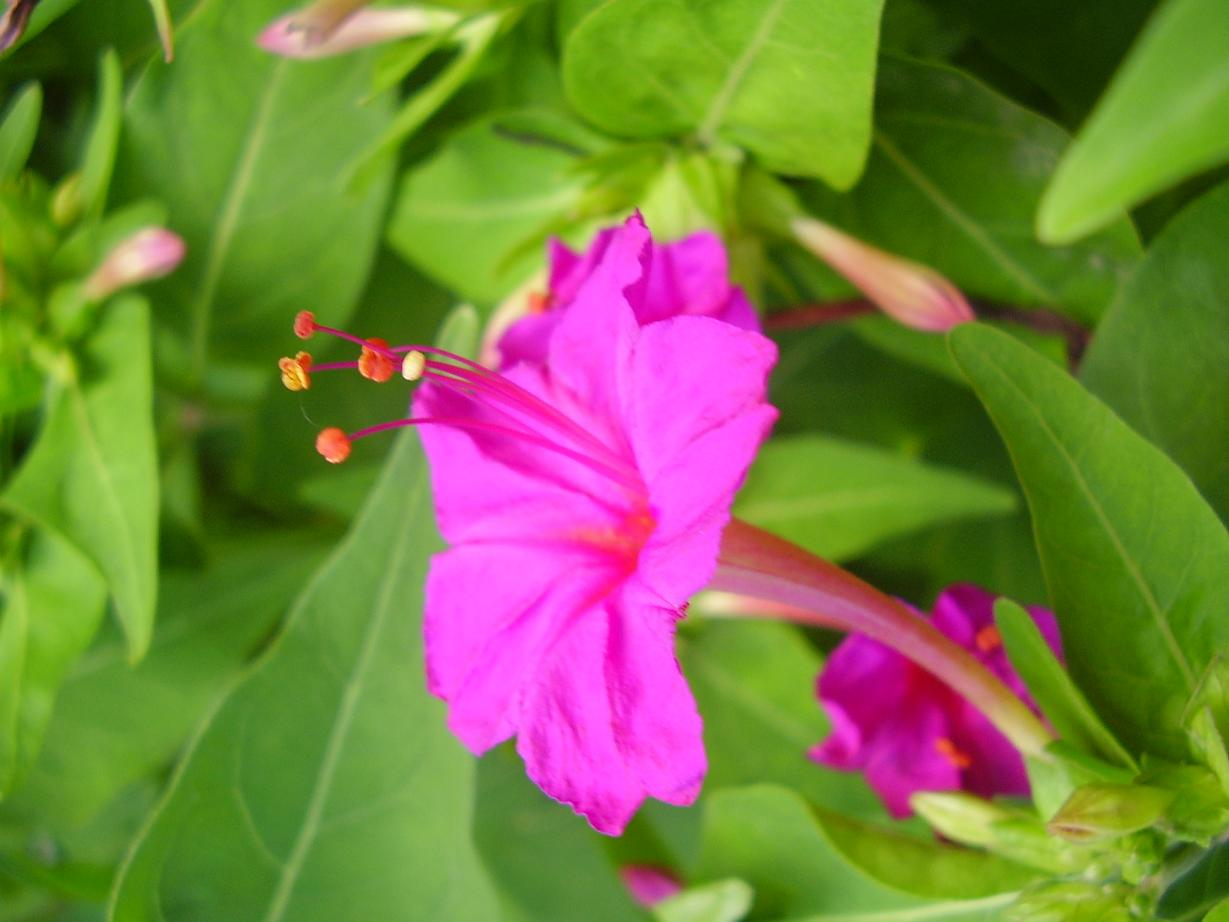

Scientific classification
- Kingdom: Plantae
- Clade: Tracheophytes
- Clade: Angiosperms
- Clade: Eudicots
- Order: Caryophyllales
- Family: Nyctaginaceae
- Genus: Mirabilis
- Species: M. jalapa

Binomial name
- Mirabilis jalapa L.

= Mirabilis jalapa =

Species of flower

Mirabilis jalapa, the marvel of Peru or four o'clock flower, is the most commonly grown ornamental species of Mirabilis plant, and is available in a range of colors. Mirabilis in Latin means wonderful and Jalapa (or Xalapa) is the state capital of Veracruz in Mexico. Mirabilis jalapa is believed to have been cultivated by the Aztecs for medicinal and ornamental purposes.

The flowers usually open from late afternoon or at dusk (namely between 4 and 8 o'clock), giving rise to one of its common names. The flowers then produce a strong, sweet fragrance throughout the night, then close in the morning. New flowers open the following day. It arrived in Europe in 1525. Today, it is common in many tropical regions and is also valued in Europe as an ornamental plant, although not necessarily hardy. It is the children's state flower of Connecticut under the name of Michaela Petit's Four O'Clocks.

== Etymology ==
The name of Mirabilis jalapa given by Carl Von Linné in 1753 is formed from the scientific Latin Mirabilis meaning "admirable" by allusion to the remarkable colors of its flowers and the specific name jalapa that would refer to its origin in the Jalapa in Guatemala. But the epithet of jalapa could also refer to the city of Xalapa (Jalapa) in Mexico from which came a former purgative drug, named jalap, taken from the tubers of the tuberous jalap. Xalapa also gives its name to the Jalapeño pepper.

Linnaeus refers to all species of Jalapa described by Joseph Pitton de Tournefort who in 1694 wrote:

"The Jalap, or Belle de Nuit is a kind of plant whose flower is a funnel-shaped flared pipe with a crenellated pavilion ... Father Plumier assured me that the Jalap, which is brought to us with the root of America, was a true species of Belle de nuit. We have also received the seed, which has produced in the Jardin Royal de Paris a plant quite like the common Belle de nuit; but this seed is more wrinkled, and the leaves of the plant are less smooth."

== Description ==
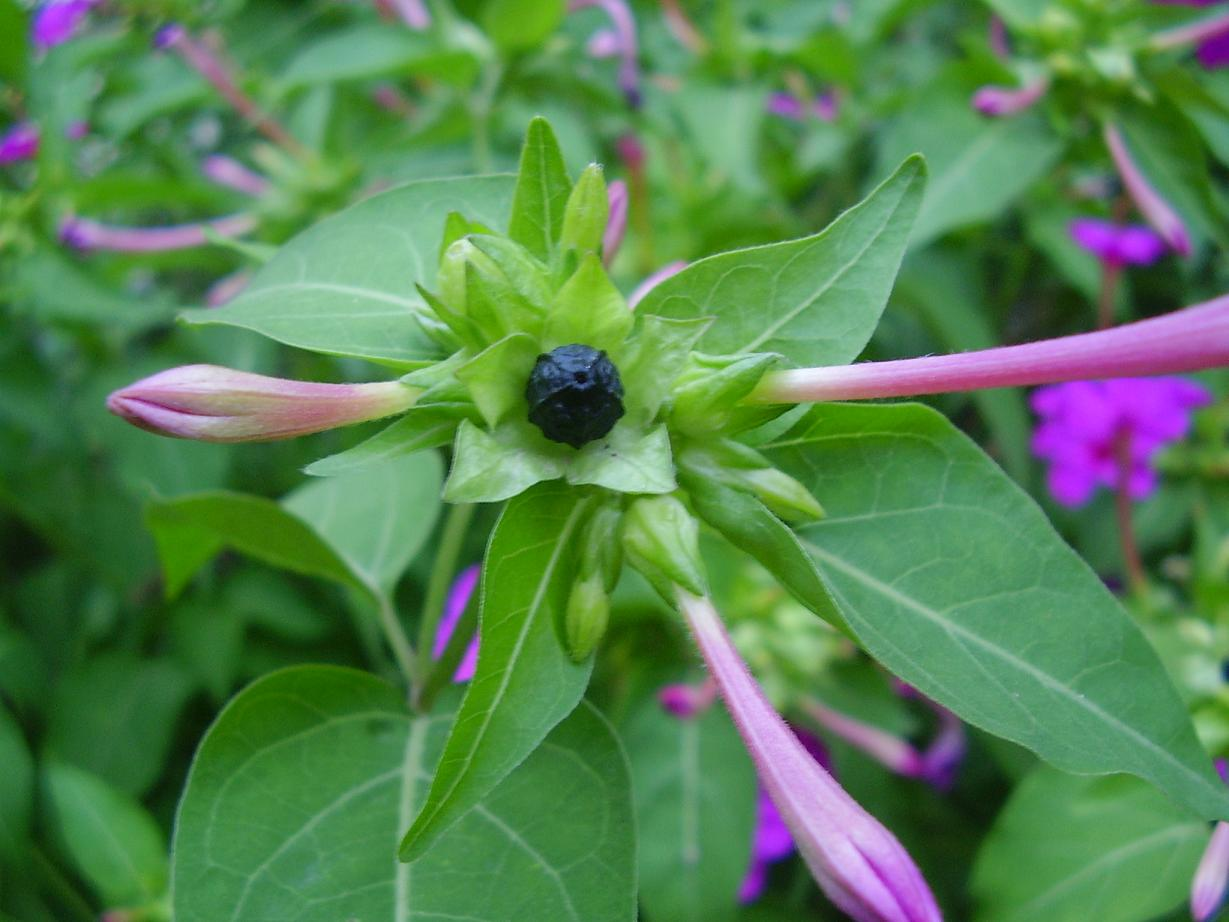
Fruit, seed, and bud

It is a perennial, herbaceous, bushy plant that reaches stature heights of mostly 1 meter, rarely up to 2 meters, in height. It may also be grown as an annual, especially in the temperate zone. The single-seeded fruits are spherical, wrinkled and black upon maturity, having started out greenish-yellow. The stems are thick, full, quadrangular with many ramifications and rooting at the nodes. The posture is often prostrate.

A curious aspect of M. jalapa is that flowers with different colors grow simultaneously on the same plant. Additionally, an individual flower can be splashed with different colors. Flower patterns are referred to as sectors (whole sections of flower), flakes (stripes of varying length), and spots. A single flower can be plain yellow, red, magenta, pink, or white, or have a combination of sectors, flakes, and spots. Furthermore, different combinations of flowers and patterns can occur on different flowers of the same plant.

Usually, the flowers are yellow, pink and white, but a different combination of flowers growing on the same single four o’clock plant can be found. Another interesting point is a color-changing phenomenon. For example, in the yellow variety, as the plant matures, it can display flowers that gradually change to a dark pink colour. Similarly, white flowers can change to light violet. Despite their appearance, the flowers are not formed from petals – rather they are a pigmented modification of the calyx. Similarly, the 'calyx' is an involucre of bracts. The flowers are funnel-shaped and pentalobed, they have no cup (replaced by bracteal leaves) but are made of a corolla.

4'o clock plant or mirabilis jalapa flower blossoming time lapse

The inflorescences contain three to seven unpopped flowers. Earning the name "four o'clock flower", the fragrant flowers open in the late afternoon or early evening, and also in overcast weather, and exhale a scent reminiscent of the tobacco flower, and attract moths for pollination. The anthesis lasts from 16 to 20 hours and thus remains visible part of the day. The flowers are pollinated by long-tongued moths of the family Sphingidae, such as the sphinx moths or hawk moths and other nocturnal pollinators attracted by the fragrance.

== Cultivation ==
The plant does best in full sun. Often in the sun the leaves wither, then return vigorously in the evening, when temperatures start to fall and the sun sets. It cannot stand the cold as the aerial part, with the first frosts, deteriorates and can die, but the underground part that can return to vegetate in spring remains vital. The plant will self-seed, often spreading rapidly if left unchecked in a garden. Some gardeners recommend that the seeds should be soaked before planting, but this is not totally necessary. In North America, the plant perennializes in warm, coastal environments, particularly in USDA zones 7–10. The plant is easy to grow, as long as it is sunny or partially shaded. Under these conditions, it grows very quickly.

It grows preferably in light soil, rich in humus and well draining, it is neutral side acidity (pH). Pot cultivation is always possible with a mixture of 80% soil and 20% garden soil and a very deep container with the tubers being put at a depth of 10 cm. It is usually sown from mid-February to May. The seeds germinate rapidly at a temperature of 18 °C.

== Distribution and habitat ==
Mirabilis jalapa is native to the dry tropical regions of North, Central and South America: Mexico, Guatemala, Chile and Peru. This plant has been introduced for ornamental purposes and has become naturalized throughout tropical, subtropical and temperate regions of the world. It is currently present in many countries in Asia, Africa, United States, Middle East and Europe. In Réunion, Mirabilis jalapa was initially an ornamental species; however it became naturalized on the west coast, between 400 and 700 m altitude, and on the south coast between 0 and 700 m.

It occurs in a ruderal debris area, and is relatively common in weedy sugarcane fields on the west and south coasts. Its high seed production and rapid growth allow it to cover up to 30% to 50% in cane plots. In cooler subtropical and temperate regions, it will die back with the first frosts or as the weather starts to cool down (especially after it fully matures and finished self-seeding), regrowing in the following spring from the tuberous roots.

== Genetic studies ==
Around 1900, Carl Correns used Mirabilis as a model organism for his studies on cytoplasmic inheritance. He used the plant's variegated leaves to prove that certain factors outside the nucleus affected phenotype in a way not explained by Mendel's theories. Correns proposed that leaf colour in Mirabilis was passed on via a uni-parental mode of inheritance.

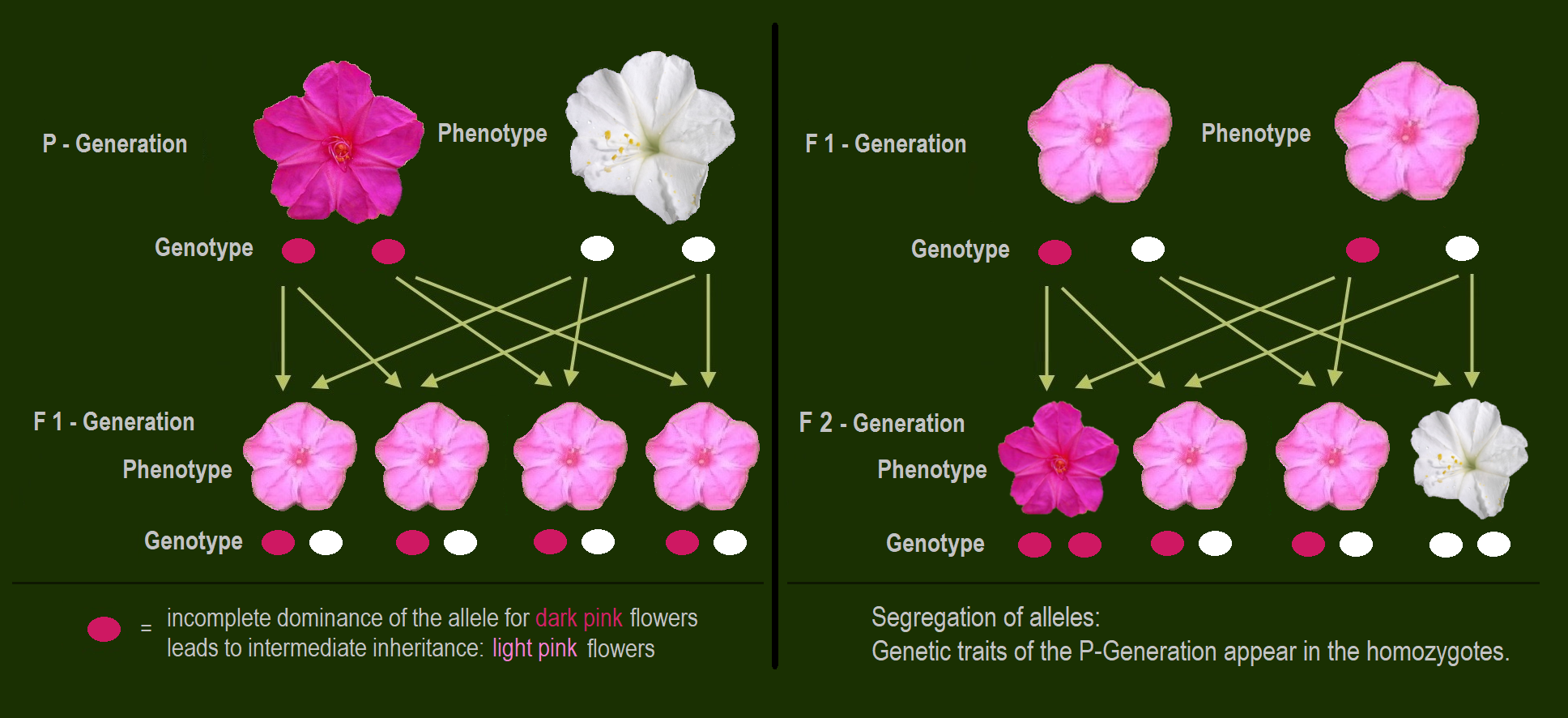

Also when plants with dark-pink flowers are crossed with white-flowered plants, light-pink-flowered offspring are produced. This is seen as an exception to Mendel's Law of Dominance because in this case, the dark-pink and white genes seem to be of equal strength, so neither completely dominates the other. The phenomenon is known as incomplete dominance. However the Mendelian principle of uniformity in the F_{1}-generation and the principle of segregation in the F_{2}-generation of genes do apply, which confirms the importance of Mendel's discoveries.

== Gallery ==
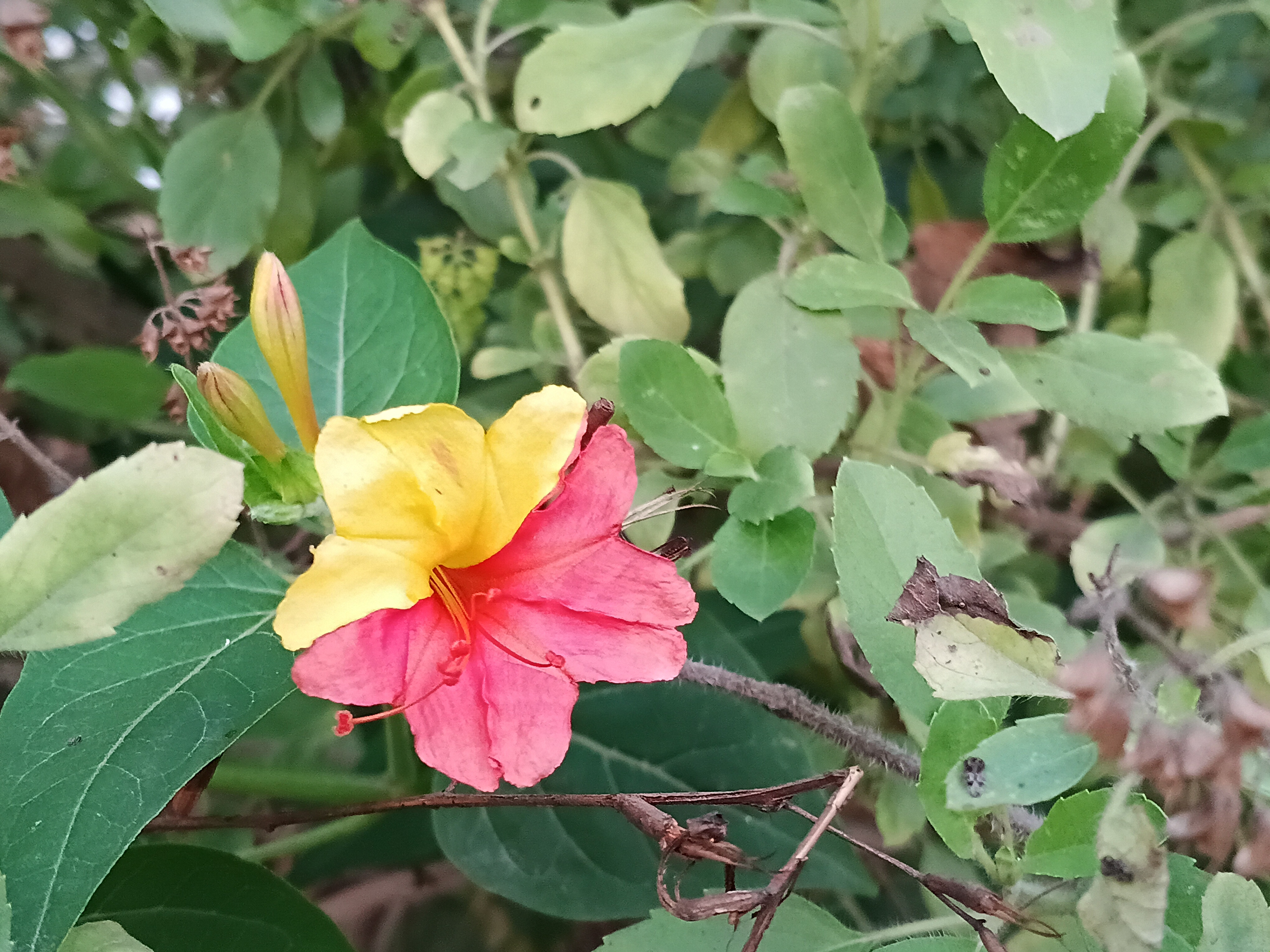
Complete bilateral (sectorial) chimera of Mirabilis jalapa (top view). Clean yellow–magenta split. Photographed in Cumilla, Bangladesh

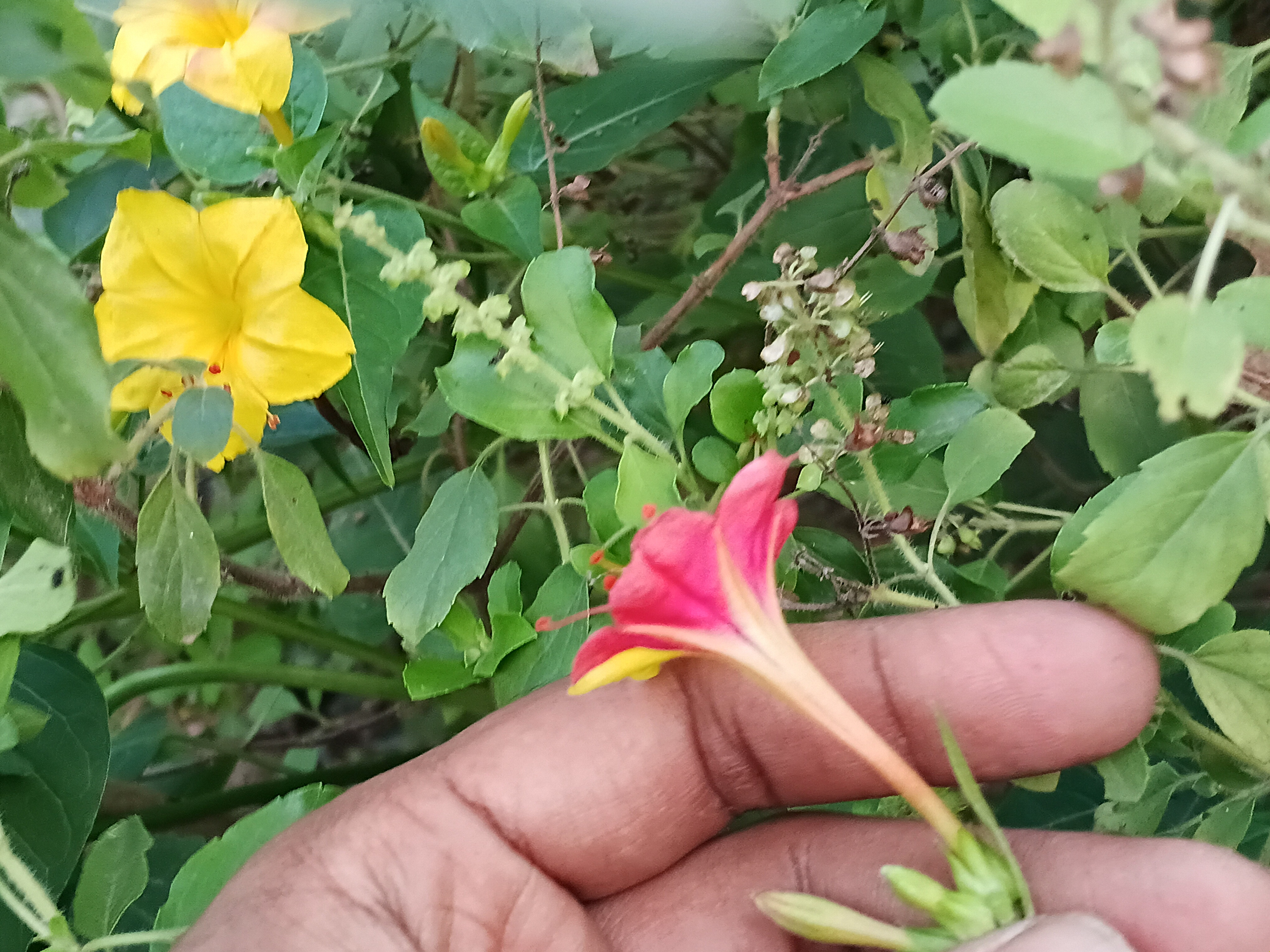
Same bilateral chimera flower from the side, showing the color split extending into the perianth tube

== Chemistry ==
Eight betaxanthins (indicaxanthin, vulgaxanthin-I, miraxanthin-I, II, III, IV, V and VI) can be isolated from M. jalapa flowers.

Rotenoids (mirabijalone A, B, C and D, 9-O-methyl-4-hydroxyboeravinone B, boeravinone C and boeravinone F, and 1,2,3,4-tetrahydro-1-methylisoquinoline-7,8-diol) can be isolated from the roots.

A fatty acid (8-hydroxyoctadeca-cis-11,14-dienoic acid) is found as a minor component in the seed oil.

Analysis of the methanolic extract of the aerial parts yields β-sitosterol, stigmasterol, ursolic acid, oleanolic acid and brassicasterol.

Bioassay-guided fractionation of an organic extract of the cell mass from a manipulated plant cell culture of M. jalapa led to the isolation and subsequent identification of an isoflavone, a roteinoid and a dehydrorotenoid. Two of these compounds are responsible for the antimicrobial activity against Candida albicans.

Bioassay-guided fractionation of the methanolic extract of M. jalapa also led to the isolation of an active polyphenolic amide: N-trans-feruloyl 4′-O-methyldopamine. This compound shows moderate activity as an efflux pump inhibitor against multidrug-resistant Staphylococcus aureus.

== Uses ==
- The flowers are used in food colouring. The leaves may be eaten cooked as well, but only as an emergency food.
- An edible crimson dye is obtained from the flowers to color cakes and jellies.
- In herbal medicine, parts of the plant may be used as a diuretic, purgative, and for vulnerary (wound healing) purposes. The root is believed to be an aphrodisiac as well as having diuretic and purgative properties. It is also used in the treatment of dropsy.
- The leaves are used to reduce inflammation. A decoction of them (by mashing and boiling) is used to treat abscesses. Leaf juice may be used to treat wounds. The bulbous roots of the flower have a laxative effect.
- Powdered, the seed of some varieties is used as a cosmetic and a dye. The seeds are considered poisonous.
- The plant has a potential for the bioremediation of soils polluted with moderate concentrations of heavy metals such as cadmium.
- In Brazil, the Kayapo sniff the powder of dried flowers to cure headaches and use the root decoction to wash wounds and treat skin conditions such as leprosy. In Peru, juice extracted from flowers is used for herpes lesions and earache. The juice extracted from the root is also used to treat earache, as well as diarrhea, dysentery, syphilis and liver infections. In Mexico, decoctions of the whole plant are used for dysentery, infected wounds, and bee and scorpion stings.
- Flower extract can be used as a natural pH indicator in acid–base titration. This was found and demonstrated to be both economical and accurate by Shishir et al. 2008.
- Some studies suggest that M. jalapa is an ancient introduction to the Himalayan region.

== Gallery ==
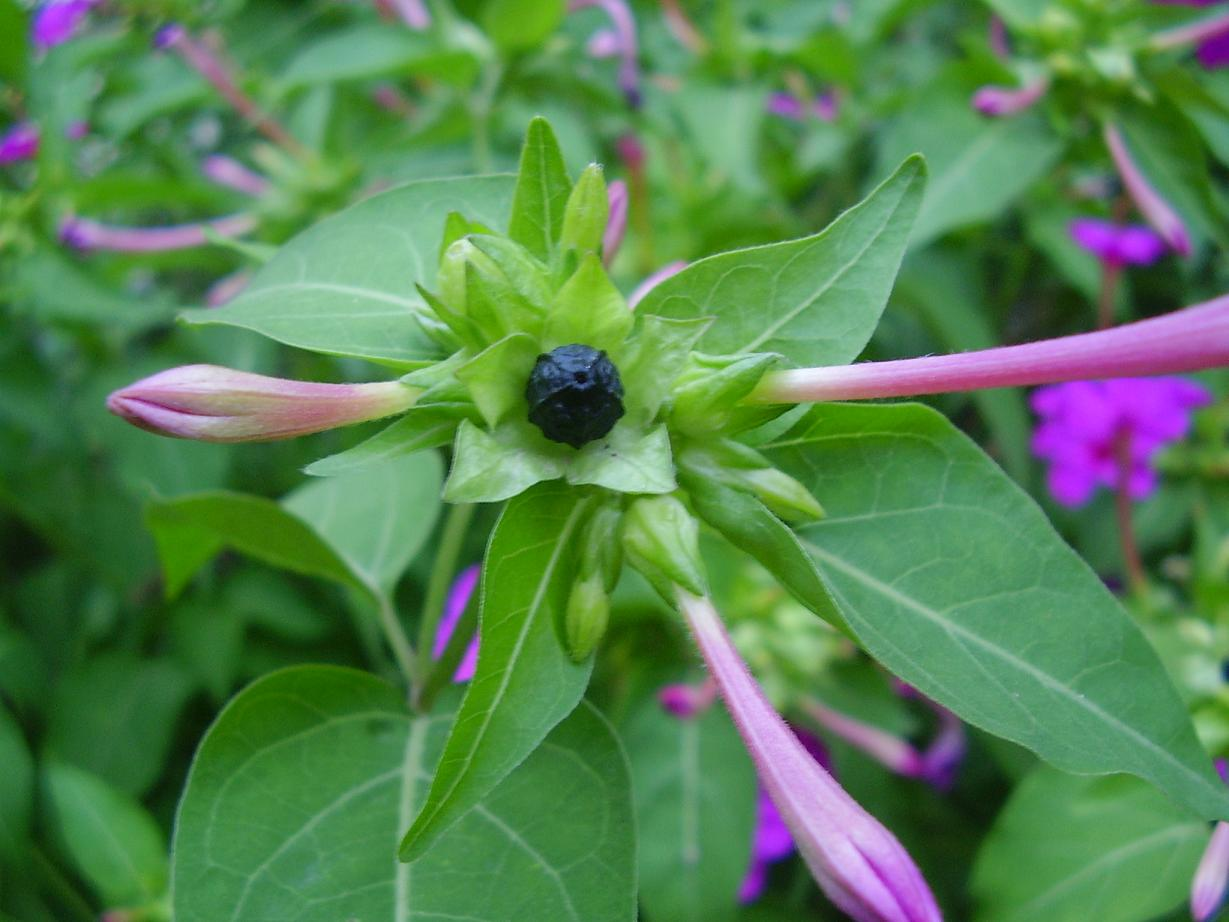
Fruit of Mirabilis jalapa

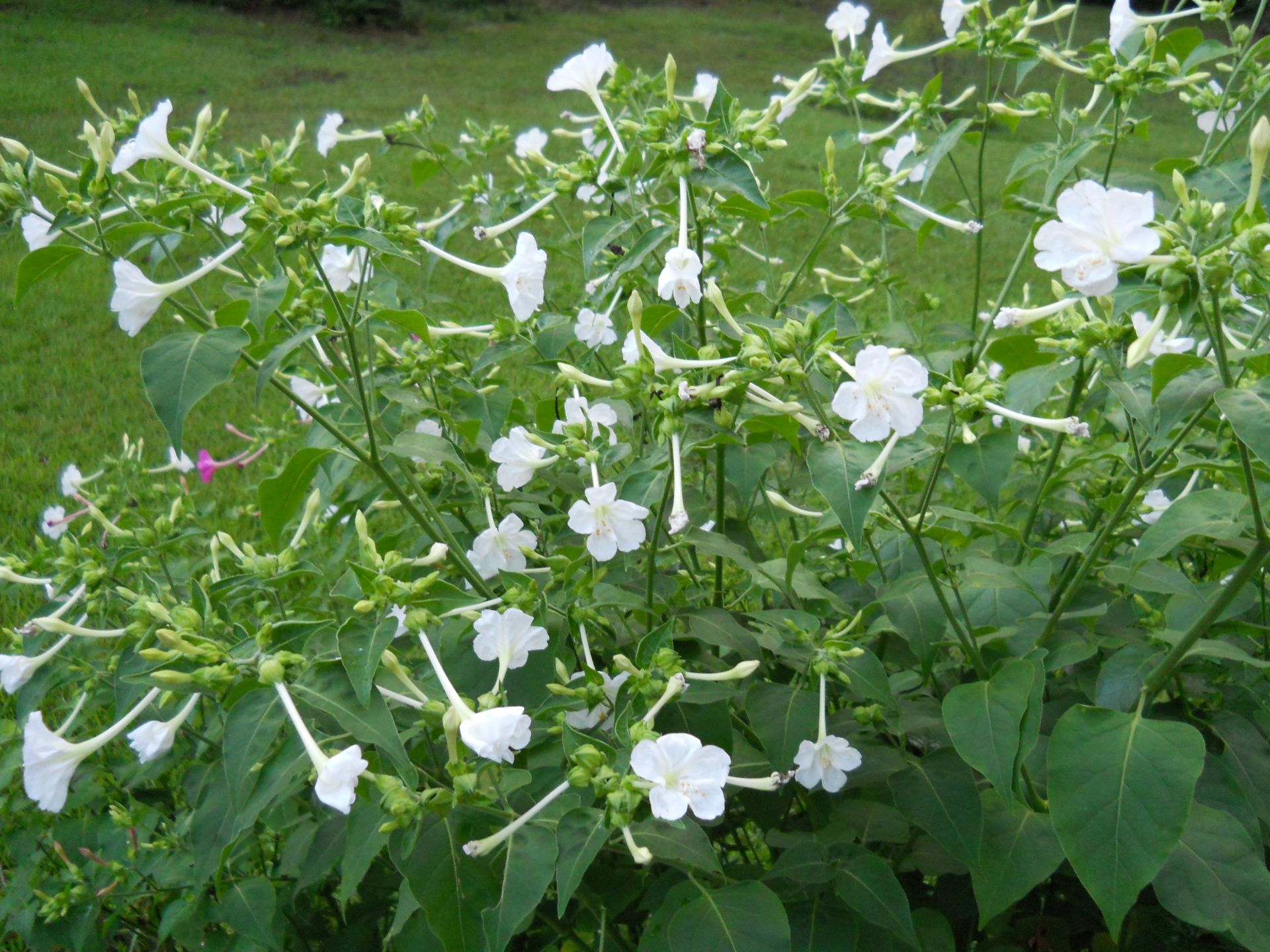
A four o'clock plant in full bloom.

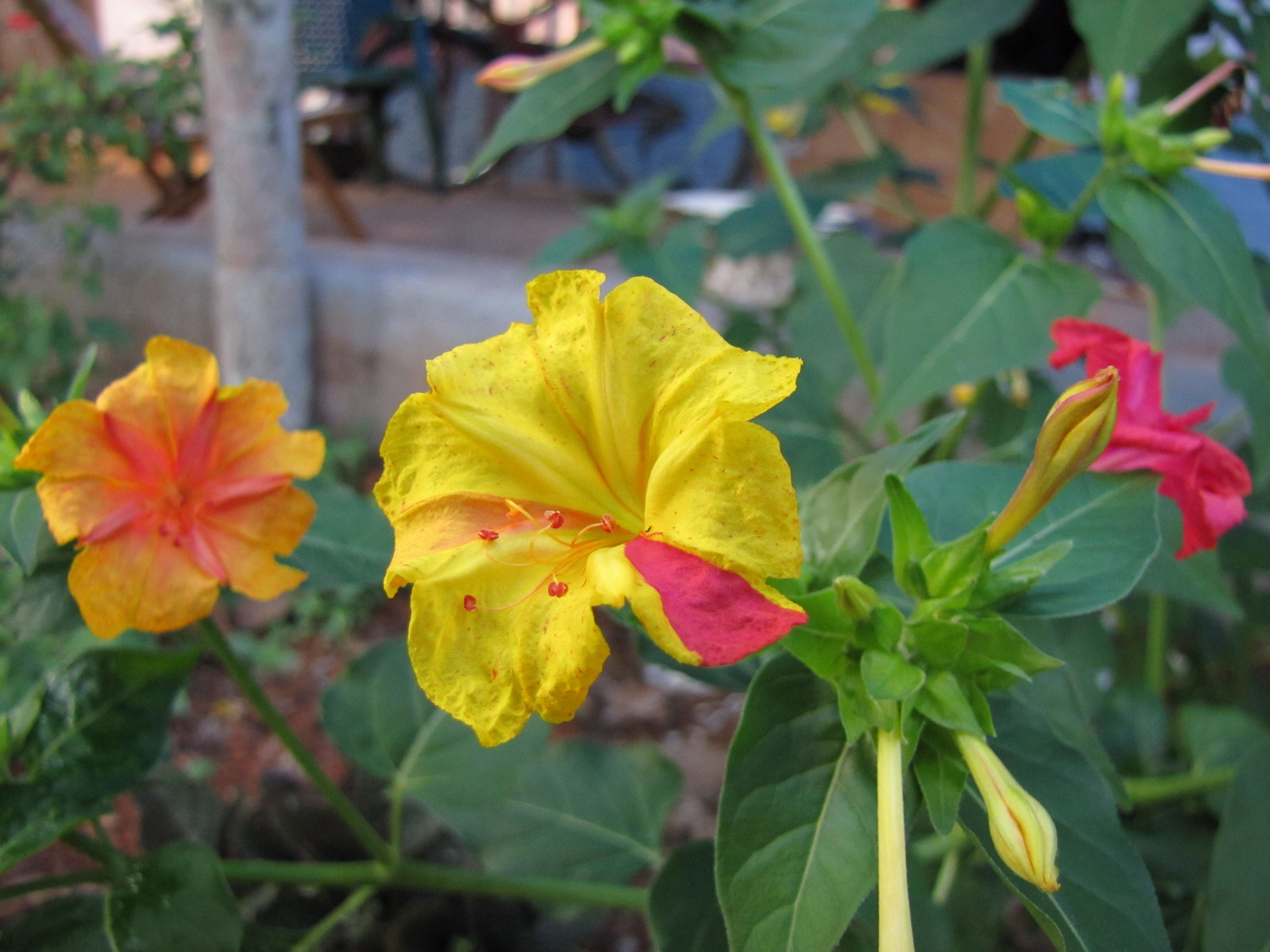
Different color variation in the flower and different color flowers in the same plant.

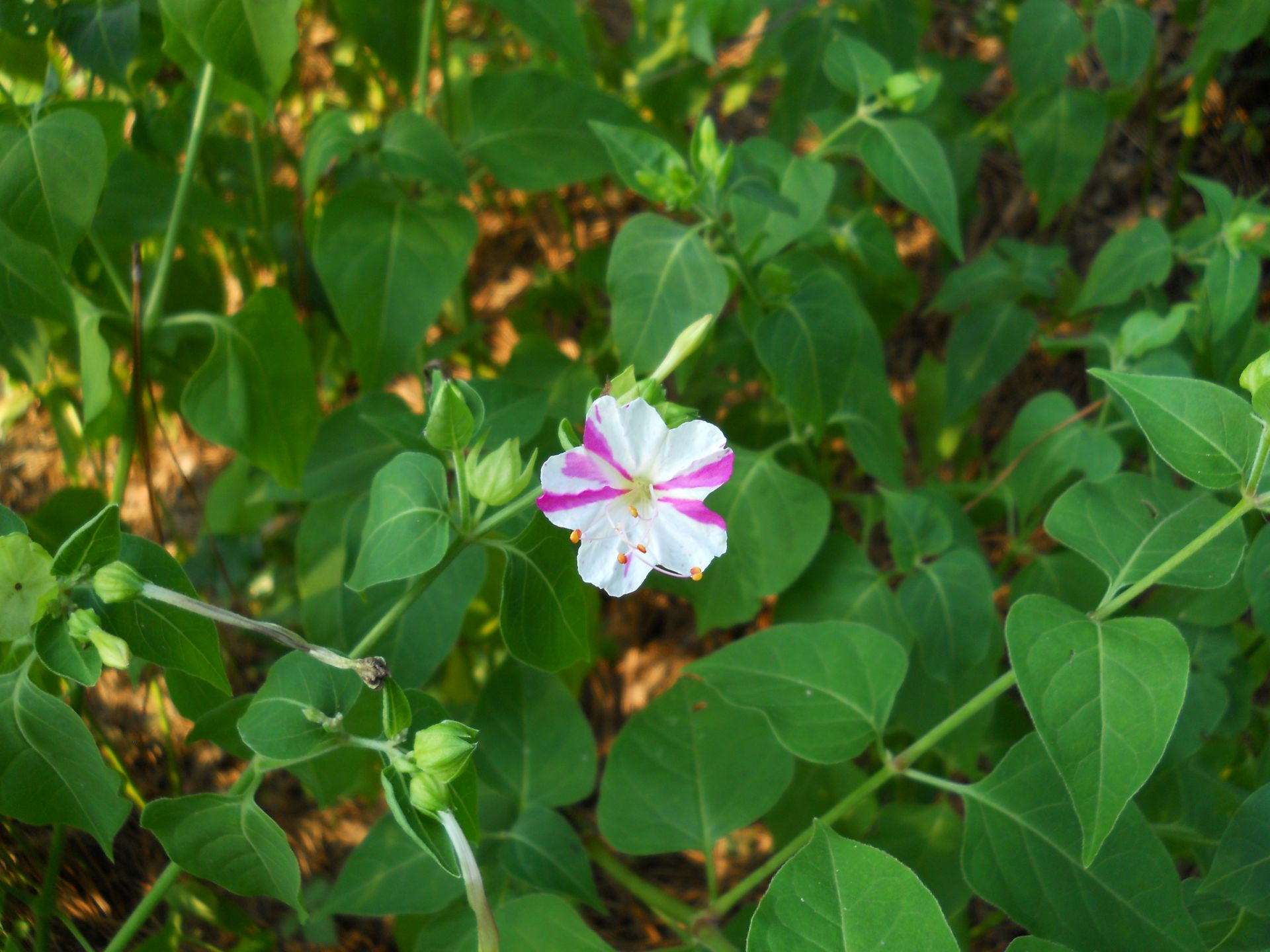
Variegated flower on a four o'clock plant.

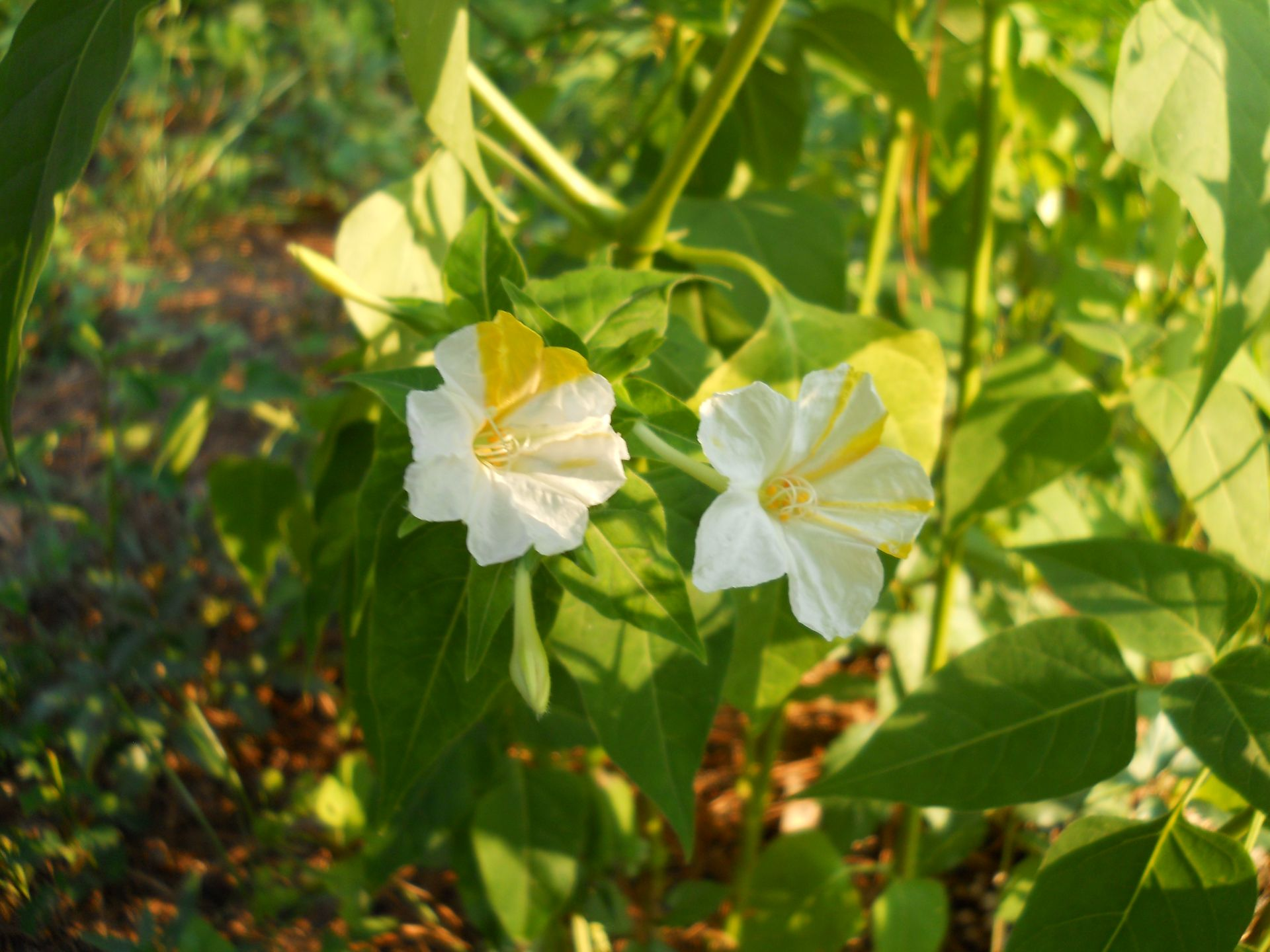
Naturally occurring color variation on four o'clock flowers.

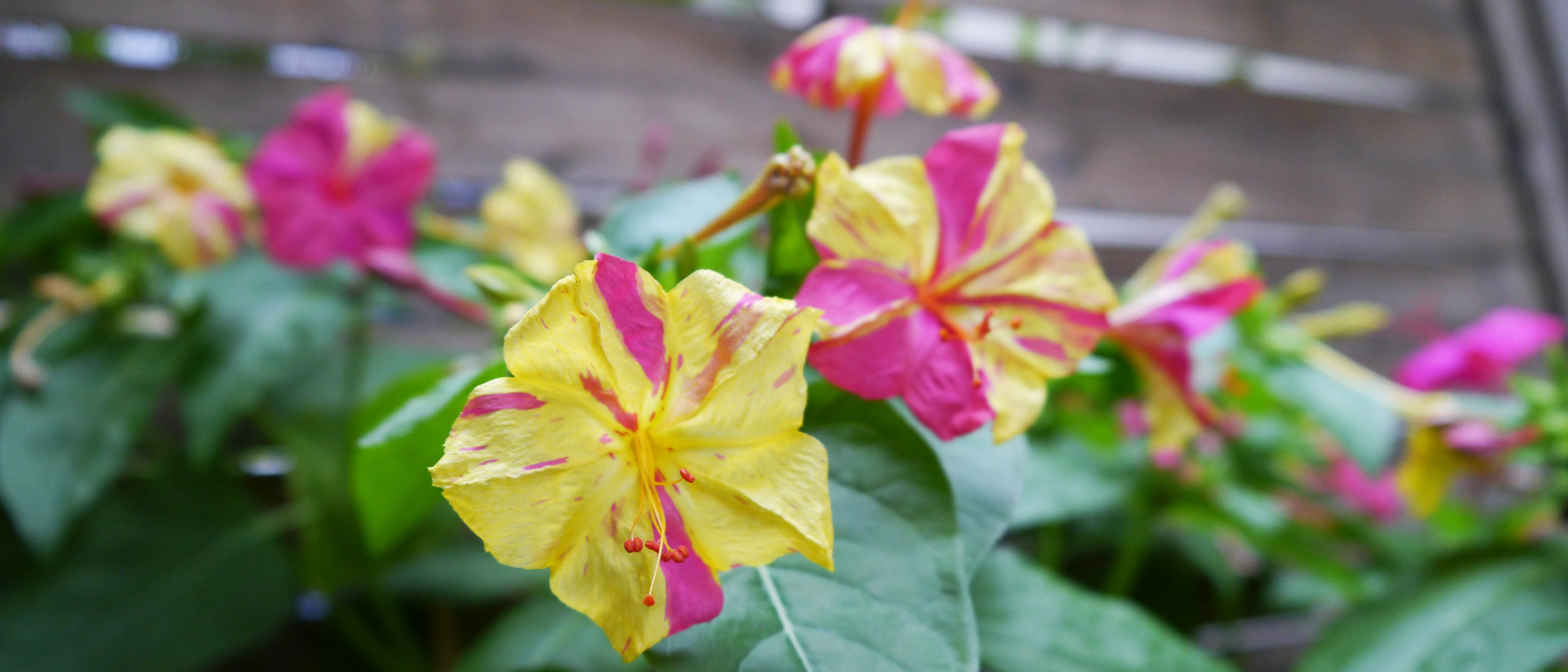
Flowers in various colours

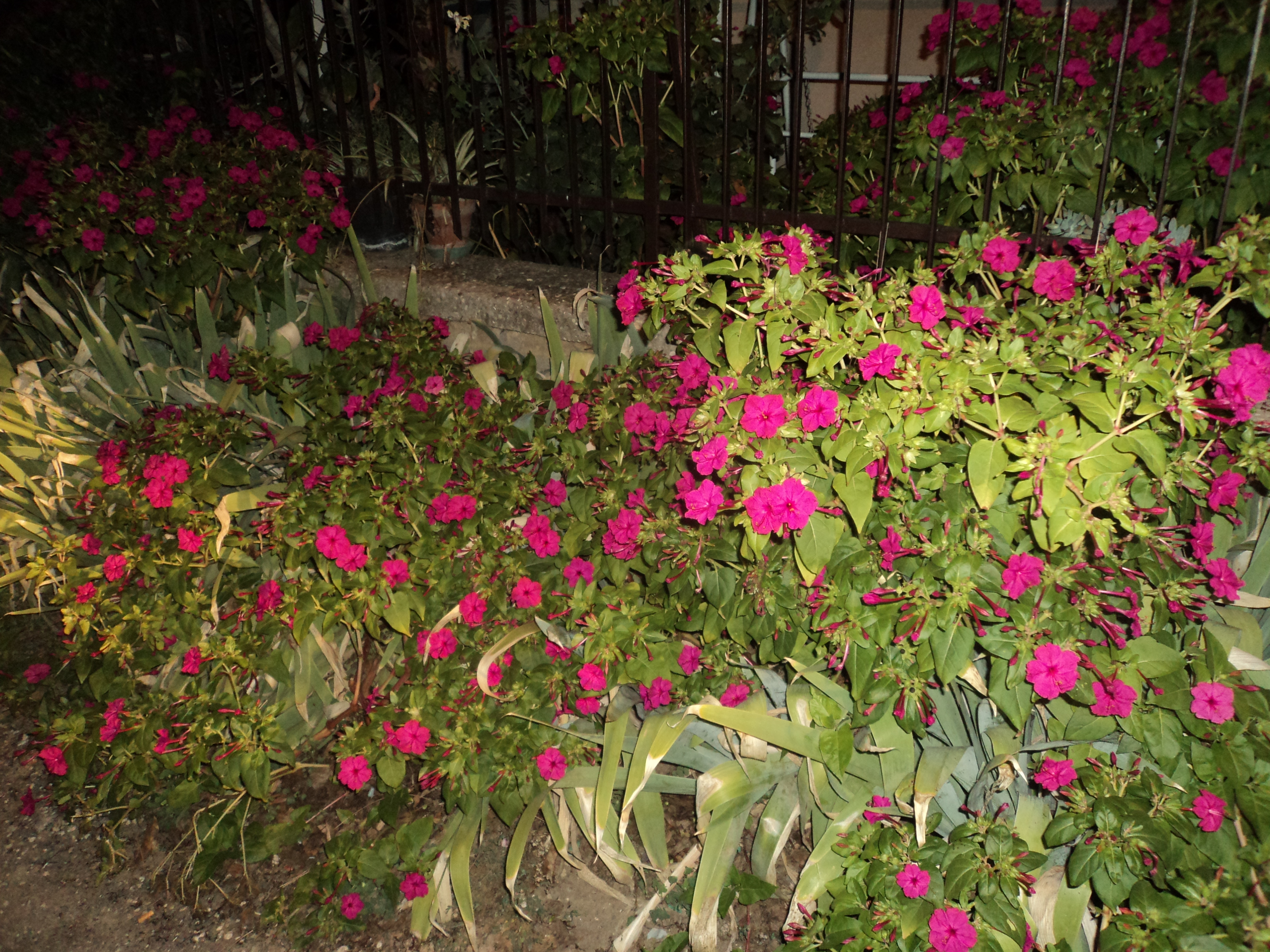
Garden

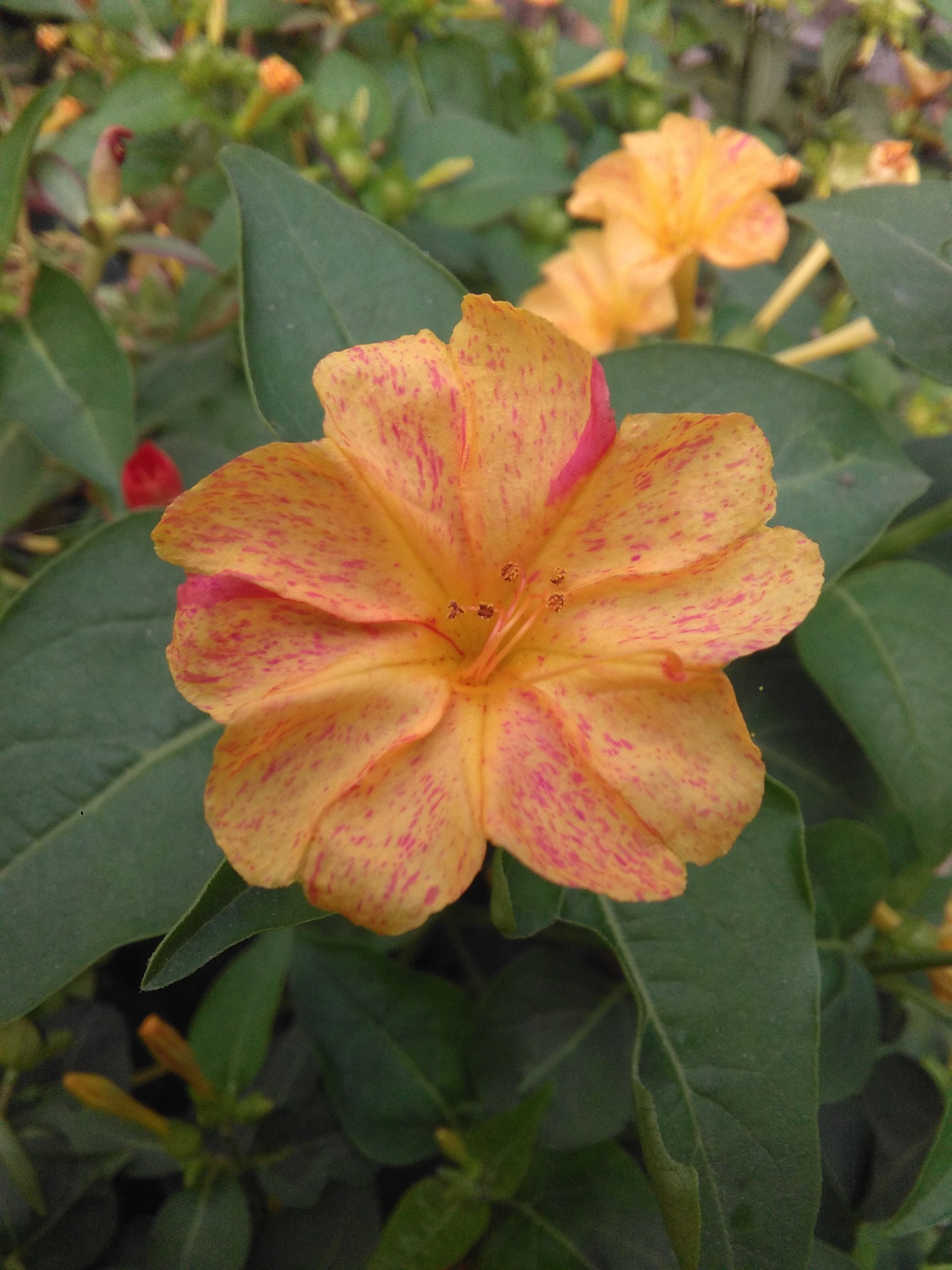
Mirabilis jalapa

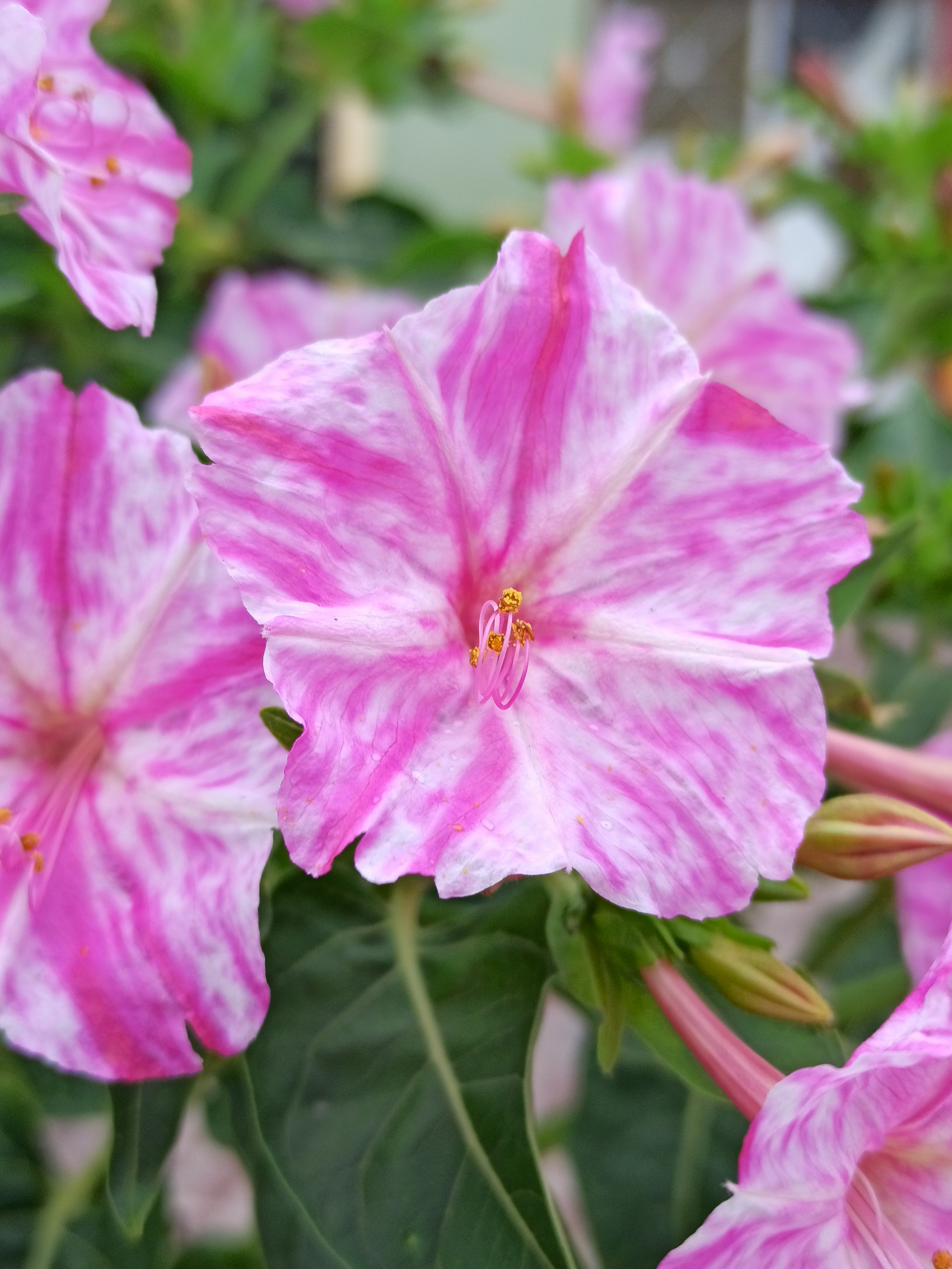
Pink and white

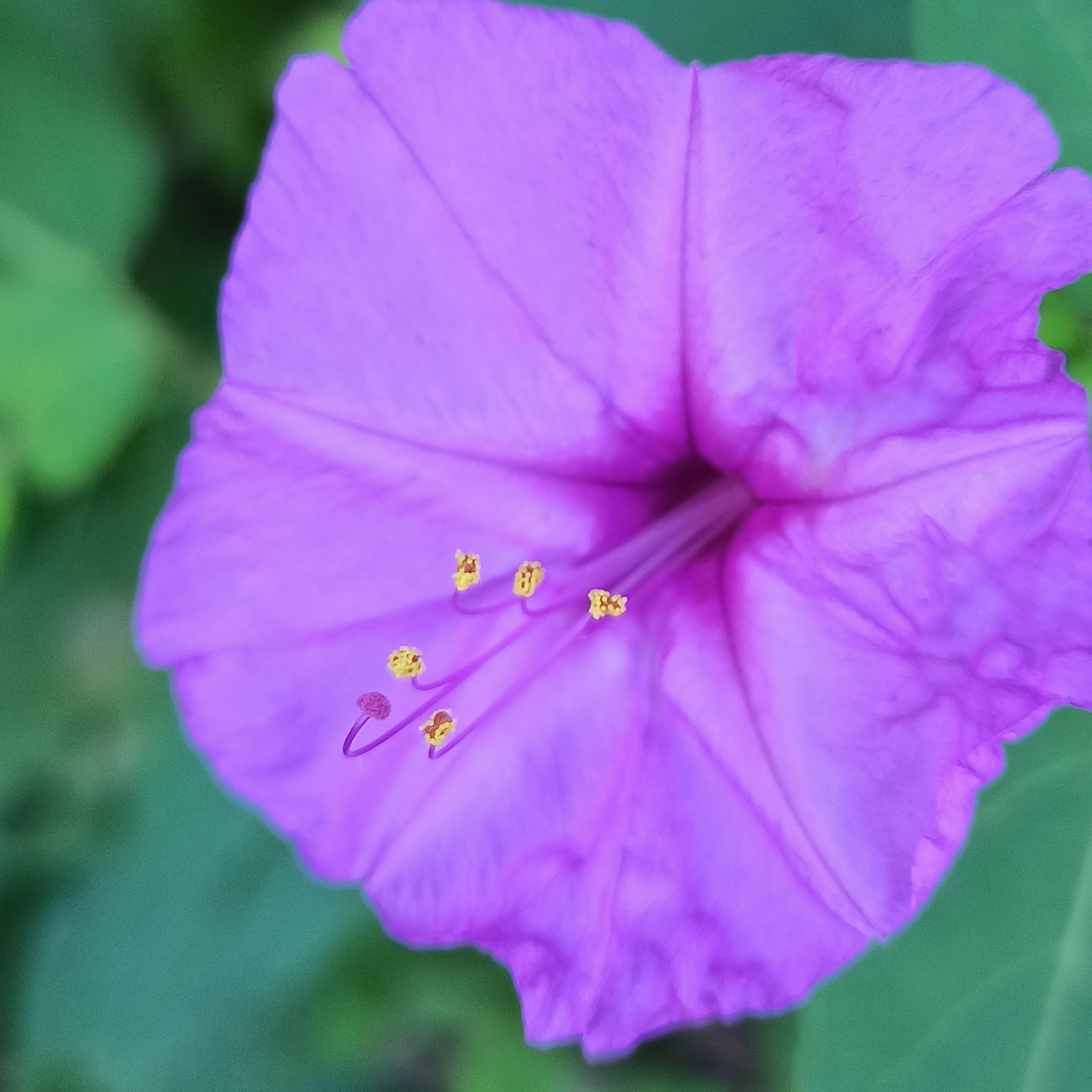
Stamens

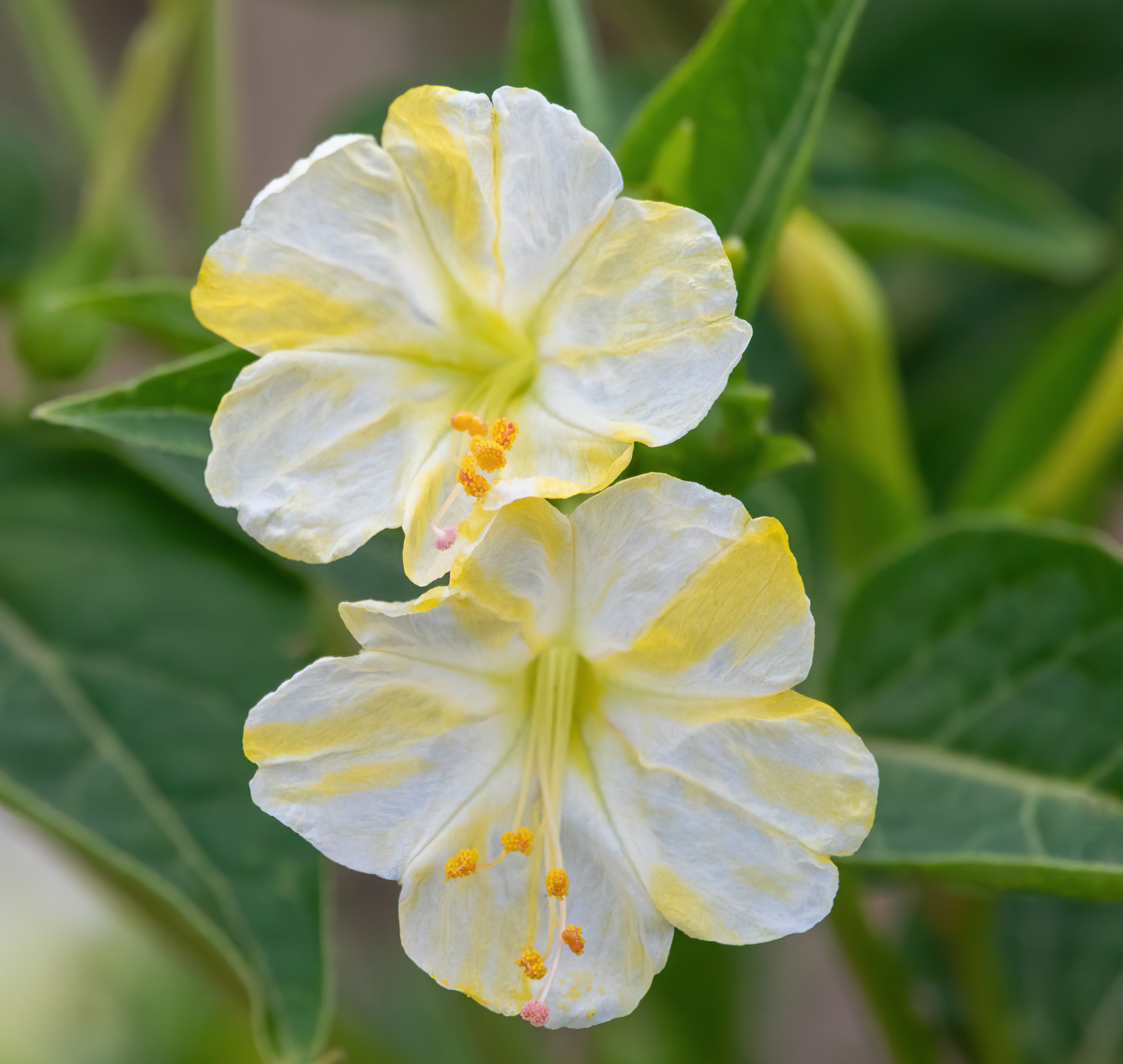
Mirabilis jalapa cultivar

== Common names ==
- In Greece it is called "Nychtolouloudo" (Νυχτολούλουδο) meaning “night flower” and "Deilina" (Δειλινά) meaning “sunsets”.
- In Maldives it is called "asurumaa"، meaning flower blooming at "Asr" - the third daily and obligatory prayer of Muslims performed between 3:00 to 4:00pm in Maldives, thus supporting the claim of 4 o'clock flower.
- In Bangladesh it is called sandhyamalati (Bengali: সন্ধ্যামালতী), meaning "evening flower".
- In Pakistan it is called gul adnan (Urdu: گل عدنان) or gul-e-abbas (Urdu: گل عباس).
- In West Bengal it is called sandhyamoni (Bengali: সন্ধ্যামণি), meaning "evening gem ".
- In Sri Lanka it is called hendirikka (Sinhala: හෙන්දිරික්කා).
- In Karnataka it is called sanje mallige (Kannada: ಸಂಜೆ ಮಲ್ಲಿಗೆ).
- In Tamil Nadu it is called andhi mandhaarai (Tamil: அந்தி மந்தாரை).
- In Thailand it is called bānyĕn (Thai: บานเย็น), meaning "evening blossom".
- In Andhra Pradesh it is called "chandrakantha"(Telugu: చంద్రకాంత), meaning "moon light". Signifying it's bloom with moon rise.
- In Bulgaria it is called noshtna krasavica (Bulgarian: нощна красавица), which means "night beauty", "night belle".
- In Germany it is called Wunderblume, which means "flower of miracle".
- In Kerala it is called naalumani poovu (Malayalam: നാലുമണിപ്പൂ, പതിറ്റടിമുല്ല, which means "four o'clock flower"
- In Maharashtra it is called gulabakshi (Marathi: गुलबक्षी).
- In Assam it is called godhuli gopal (Assamese: গধূলিগোপাল), godhuli meaning "evening".
- In Maithili it is called sanjhaa phool as it blooms in evening.
- In Odisha it is called rangani (Odia: ରଂଗଣୀ).
- In Punjabi it is called sham di sohnap, which means "evening beauty".
- In Indonesia it is called bunga pukul empat.
- In Malaysia it is called seroja
- In China it is called the "shower flower" (Chinese: 洗澡花; pinyin: xǐzǎo huā) or "rice boiling flower" (simplified Chinese: 煮饭花; traditional Chinese: 煮飯花; pinyin: zhǔfàn huā) because it is in bloom at the time of these activities.
- In Hong Kong it is known as "purple jasmine" (Chinese: 紫茉莉; pinyin: zǐ mòlì).
- The Turkish name is akşam sefası, which means "evening pleasure".
- In the Netherlands and in France the name of the plant is nachtschone and belle de nuit respectively meaning "beauty of the night".
- In Italy it is called bella di notte, which means "beautiful during night".
- In Iran it is called laleh abbasi (Persian: لاله عباسی).
- In Japan it is called oshiroi-bana (Japanese: オシロイバナ), as the white, powdery endosperm inside of mature seeds looks like oshiroi, the powder foundation used by geishas.
- In Israel it is named lilanit rav-gonit (Hebrew: לילנית רב-גונית; "multicolored nocturnal"), and more commonly called malkat halayla (Hebrew: מלכת הלילה), meaning "queen of the night".
- In Namibia it is called vieruurtjie ("four o'clock") as it starts to open at 16:00 until the morning.
- In Poland it is called dziwaczek, meaning "a little weirdo, a little oddity" that denotes its flowering time.
- In Slovenia it is called nočna frajlica, meaning "night missy".
- In Croatia and Serbia it is called noćurak (Serbian: ноћурак).
- In Romania it is called frumoasa nopții, meaning "the beauty of the night", or also noptiță.
- In the Philippines it is called prinsesa ng gabi, meaning "princess of the night" or sometimes alas quatro, "at four o'clock".
- In Chile it is called putita, meaning "little hooker", because she is prettiest when her flowers come out at night.
- In Mexico and Cuba it is called maravilla, meaning "marvel".
- In Malta it is called ħummejr.
- In Russia it is called zor'ka (Russian: зорька), meaning "dawning".
- In Syria it is called alshab alzarif (Arabic: الشاب الظريف) meaning "the charming young man".
- In Ukraine it is called nichna krasunya (Ukrainian: нічна красуня), meaning "night beauty".
- In Colombia it is called Don Diego de noche, meaning "Mr. Diego of night".
- In Puerto Rico it is called Ceciliana.
- In Lebanon it is called shab el layl (Arabic: شاب الليل), meaning "young man of the night".
- In Uttarakhand it is called "गुल बांक" Gul baank
- In North Macedonia it is called "вампирче" or "ноќна убавица" meaning "vampire" or "Nightly beauty"
