= Vulgaxanthin =

Chemical structures of vulgaxathanins

Vulgaxanthin I

Vulgaxanthin II

Vulgaxanthin III

Vulgaxanthin IV

Vulgaxanthins are a group of betaxanthins with types I, II, III, IV, and V. They are the predominant yellow plant pigments found in red beets, among other plants such Mirabilis jalapa and swiss chard. They are antioxidant pigments. Like all betaxanthins, they are not glycosides and cannot be hydrolyzed by acid without degradation. Water activity also affects stability of this antioxidant.

Vulgaxanthins have been studied as natural nutritional additives, but their instability is a limitation.

== Reactions ==
- Vulgaxanthin-II + Ammonia + NADH = Vulgaxanthin-I + NAD^{+} + H_{2}O
- Vulgaxanthin-I + H_{2}O = Vulgaxanthin-II + Ammonia
- Vulgaxanthin-II + ATP + Ammonia = Vulgaxanthin-I + ADP + Orthophosphate
- Vulgaxanthin-II + ATP + Ammonia = Vulgaxanthin-I + Diphosphate + 5'-AMP
- Betalamic acid + L-Glutamine + ATP = Vulgaxanthin-I + ADP + Orthophosphate

== See also ==
- Indicaxanthin
