= Betanin =

Red food dye from beets

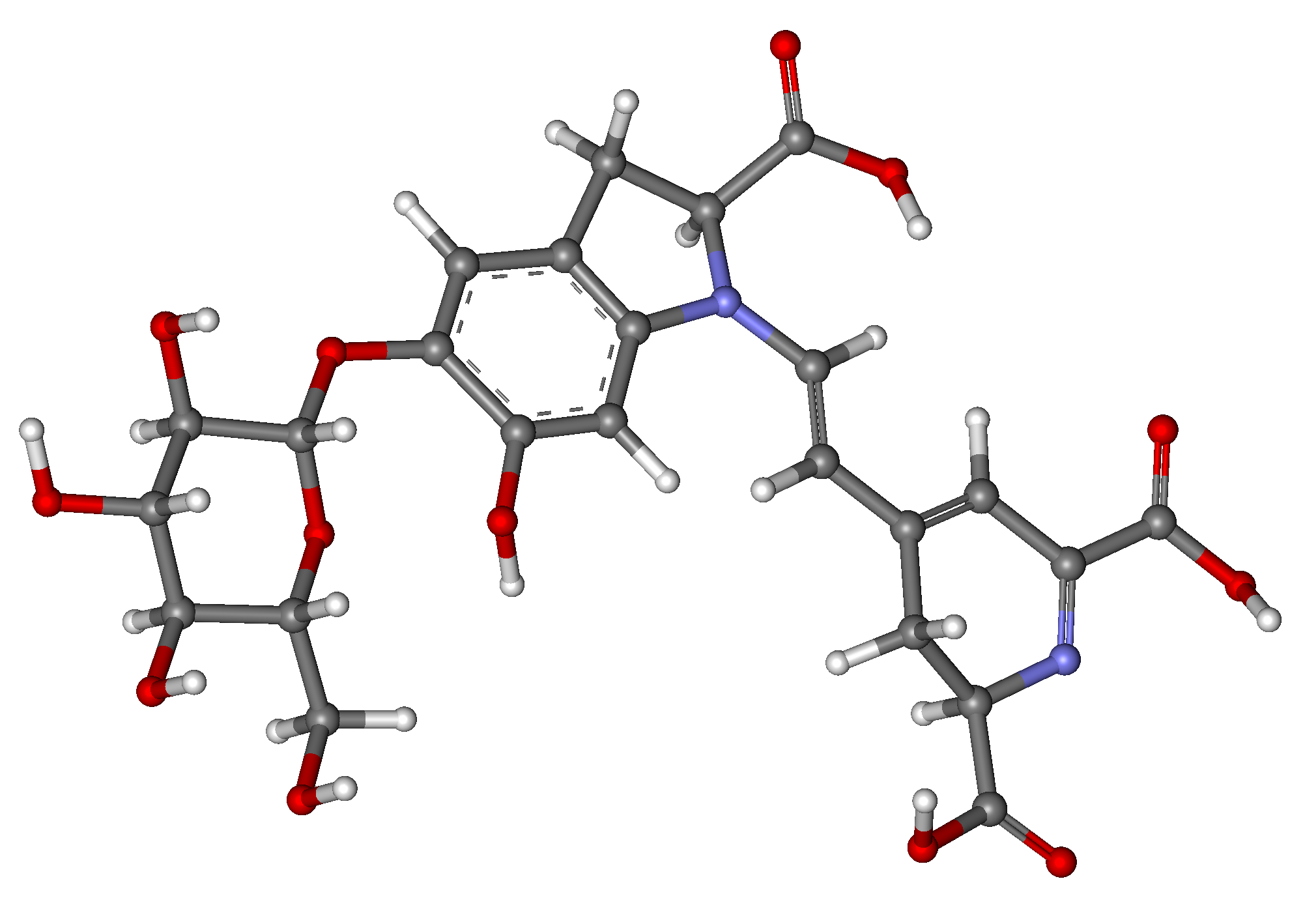

Names
- IUPAC name (2S)-1-{2-[(2S)-2,6-dicarboxy-2,3-dihydropyridin-4(1H)-ylidene]ethylidene}-5-(β-d-glucopyranosyloxy)-6-hydroxy-2,3-dihydro-1H-indol-1-ium-2-carboxylate

Identifiers
CAS Number	7659-95-2
3D model (JSmol)	Interactive image
ChEBI	CHEBI:3080
ChEMBL	ChEMBL1172614
ChemSpider	10128200
ECHA InfoCard	100.028.753
E number	E162 (colours)
KEGG	C08540
PubChem CID	12300103
UNII	5YJC992ZP6
CompTox Dashboard (EPA)	DTXSID80997924
- InChI: InChI=1S/C24H26N2O13/c27-8-17-18(29)19(30)20(31)24(39-17)38-16-6-10-5-14(23(36)37)26(13(10)7-15(16)28)2-1-9-3-11(21(32)33)25-12(4-9)22(34)35/h1-3,6-7,12,14,17-20,24,27,29-31H,4-5,8H2,(H4,28,32,33,34,35,36,37)/t12-,14-,17+,18+,19-,20+,24+/m0/s1 Key: DHHFDKNIEVKVKS-FMOSSLLZSA-N; InChI=1/C24H26N2O13/c27-8-17-18(29)19(30)20(31)24(39-17)38-16-6-10-5-14(23(36)37)26(13(10)7-15(16)28)2-1-9-3-11(21(32)33)25-12(4-9)22(34)35/h1-3,6-7,12,14,17-20,24,27,29-31H,4-5,8H2,(H4,28,32,33,34,35,36,37)/t12-,14-,17+,18+,19-,20+,24+/m0/s1 Key: DHHFDKNIEVKVKS-FMOSSLLZBW; InChI=1/C24H26N2O13/c27-8-17-18(29)19(30)20(31)24(39-17)38-16-6-10-5-14(23(36)37)26(13(10)7-15(16)28)2-1-9-3-11(21(32)33)25-12(4-9)22(34)35/h1-3,6-7,12,14,17-20,24,27-31H,4-5,8H2,(H,32,33)(H,34,35)(H,36,37)/b2-1+/t12?,14-,17+,18+,19-,20+,24+/m0/s1 Key: CTMLKIKAUFEMLE-BOKBUZBTBZ
- SMILES: OCC1[C@@H](O)[C@@H](O)[C@H](O)[C@@H](OC2=C(O)C=C(/[N+]([C@@H]([C@]([O-])=O)C4)=C/C=C3\C[C@H]([C@](O)=O)NC(C(O)=O)=C3)C4=C2)O1

Properties
Chemical formula	C_{24}H_{26}N_{2}O_{13}
Molar mass	550.47 g/mol
- Except where otherwise noted, data are given for materials in their standard state (at 25 °C [77 °F], 100 kPa). verify (what is ?) Infobox references

Betanin, or beetroot red, is a red glycosidic food dye obtained from beets; its aglycone, obtained by hydrolyzing the glucose molecule, is betanidin. As a food additive, its E number is E162. As a food additive, betanin has no safety concerns.

The color of betanin depends on pH; between pH four and five, it is bright bluish-red, becoming blue-violet as the pH increases. Once the pH reaches alkaline levels, betanin degrades by hydrolysis, resulting in a yellow-brown color.

Betanin is a betalain pigment, together with isobetanin and other betacyanins.

== Sources ==
Betanin is usually obtained from beet juice extract; the concentration of betanin in red beet can reach 300–600 mg/kg. Other dietary sources of betanin and other betalains include the Opuntia cactus, Swiss chard, and the leaves of some strains of amaranth.

== Uses ==
The most common uses of betanins are in coloring ice cream and powdered soft drink beverages; other uses are in some sugar confectionery, e.g. fondants, sugar strands, sugar coatings, and fruit or cream fillings. In hot-processed candies, it can be used if added at the final stage of processing. Betanin is also used in soups as well as tomato and bacon products. Betanin has "not been implicated as causing clinical food allergy when used as a coloring agent".

Betanin has also been shown to have antimicrobial activity and can be used as a natural antimicrobial agent in food preservation.

== Photophysics and photoprotection ==
Betanin exhibits very weak fluorescence, with a quantum yield typically much lower than 1%. The lifetime of the first excited state of betanin, formed upon photon absorption, depends strongly on the viscosity of the environment. In low-viscosity solvents, the excited-state relaxation pathway is enhanced, resulting in a shortened lifetime and reduced fluorescence intensity. Short excited-state lifetime makes betanin an excellent dissipator of light energy. It was demonstrated that more betanin is accumulated in Mesembryanthemum crystallinum L. leaves when the plant is exposed to strong light or UV light. It was proposed that betanin can perform photoprotective role in plants by shielding them from excessive light conditions.

== Degradation and stability ==
Betanin degrades when subjected to light, heat, and oxygen; therefore, it is used in frozen products, products with a short shelf life, or products sold in dry state. Betanin can survive pasteurization when in products with high sugar content. Its sensitivity to oxygen is highest in products with a high water content and/or containing metal cations (e.g. iron and copper); antioxidants like ascorbic acid and sequestrants can slow this process down, together with suitable packaging. In dry form, betanin is stable in the presence of oxygen.

== Safety ==
The use of betanin and other betacyanins as food coloring has a long history in Europe. A scientific panel for the European Food Safety Authority found that acute or chronic toxicity and carcinogenicity studies were too limited to make conclusive safety evaluations, and that the amounts added to foods were similar to those of naturally occurring betanin. The panel also concluded that there was insufficient information to assign an acceptable daily intake level for beetroot red.

== See also ==
- Betalain
