= Indicaxanthin =

Names
- IUPAC name 4-[2-(2-Carboxy-pyrrolidin-1-yl)-vinyl]-2,3-dihydro-pyridine-2,6-dicarboxylic acid

Identifiers
CAS Number	1632474-50-0; 2181-75-1 (non-specific)
3D model (JSmol)	Interactive image
ChemSpider	4807442
PubChem CID	6096870
UNII	J2R4J4M5NH
CompTox Dashboard (EPA)	DTXSID80944418
- InChI: InChI=1S/C14H16N2O6/c17-12(18)9-6-8(7-10(15-9)13(19)20)3-5-16-4-1-2-11(16)14(21)22/h3,5-6,10-11H,1-2,4,7H2,(H3,17,18,19,20,21,22)/t10-,11-/m0/s1 Key: RJIIQBYZGJSODH-QWRGUYRKSA-N; InChI=1/C14H16N2O6/c17-12(18)9-6-8(7-10(15-9)13(19)20)3-5-16-4-1-2-11(16)14(21)22/h3,5-6,10-11H,1-2,4,7H2,(H3,17,18,19,20,21,22)/t10-,11-/m0/s1 Key: RJIIQBYZGJSODH-QWRGUYRKBB
- SMILES: O=C(O)\C2=C\C(=C\C=[N+]1/[C@H](C([O-])=O)CCC1)C[C@@H](C(=O)O)N2

Properties
Chemical formula	C_{14}H_{16}N_{2}O_{6}
Molar mass	308.29 g/mol
- Except where otherwise noted, data are given for materials in their standard state (at 25 °C [77 °F], 100 kPa). verify (what is ?) Infobox references

Indicaxanthin is a type of betaxanthin, a plant pigment present in beets, in Mirabilis jalapa flowers, in cacti such as prickly pears (Opuntia sp.) or the red dragonfruit (Hylocereus costaricensis). It is a powerful antioxidant.

== Medical uses ==
It has been shown in a spectrophotometric study for patients with thalassemia, that indicaxanthin can reduce perferryl-Hb generated in solution from met-Hb and hydrogen peroxide, more effectively than either trolox (a vitamin E derivative) or vitamin C, possibly interfering with perferryl-Hb, a reactive intermediate in the hydroperoxide-dependent Hb degradation.

Indicaxanthin in antioxidant studies was more effective than Trolox at scavenging the ABTS cation radical.

== See also ==
- Vulgaxanthin
