= Tungi Spirit =

Distilled drink from Saint Helena

Tungi Spirit is an alcoholic beverage made in Saint Helena from the fruit of the prickly or cactus pear (Opuntia ficus-indica).

== Terminology ==
Tungi is the Saint Helenian name for the prickly or cactus pear.

== Usage ==
Three principal varieties of tungi grow on Saint Helena, but only two are used in the production of Tungi spirit. These are both examples of the largest fruit grown: the "English" (or yellow) fruit and the "Madeira" (or large red) fruit. These are cultivars of Opuntia ficus indica. The small "spiny red" tungi fruits (O. elatior) are not normally used for distillation, despite remaining in season for almost eight months of the year. By comparison with the large varieties, their juice content is low.
