= Tungi, Bihar =

Village in Bihar, India

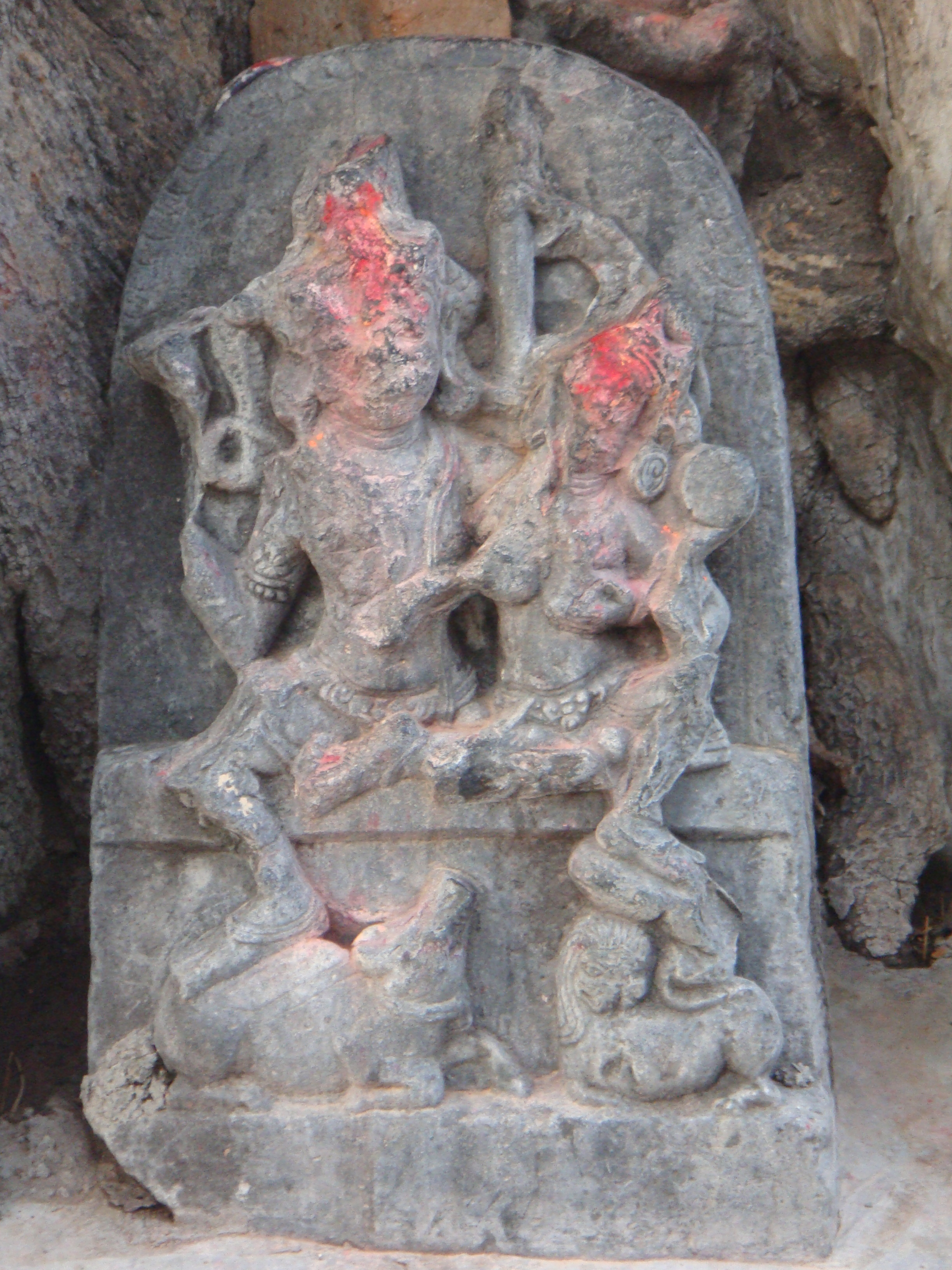
A statue from the Ancient Siva Temple, Tungi.

An inhabitant of Tungi praying.

Tungi is a village in Nalanda district, Bihar, India.
