= Betalain =

Class of chemical compounds: Red pigments

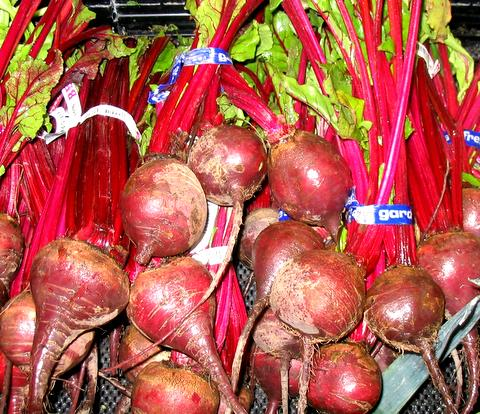
The red color of beets comes from betalain pigments.

Betalains are a class of red and yellow tyrosine-derived pigments found in plants of the order Caryophyllales, where they replace anthocyanin pigments. Betalains also occur in some higher order fungi. They are most often noticeable in the petals of flowers, but may color the fruits, leaves, stems, and roots of plants that contain them. They include pigments such as those found in beets.

== Description ==
The name "betalain" comes from the Latin name of the common beet (Beta vulgaris), from which betalains were first extracted. The deep red color of beets, bougainvillea, amaranth, and many cacti results from the presence of betalain pigments. The particular shades of red to purple are distinctive and unlike that of anthocyanin pigments found in most plants.

There are two categories of betalains:

- Betalains (also called betacyanins) include the reddish to violet betalain pigments. Among the betalains present in plants include betanin, isobetanin, probetanin, and neobetanin.
- Betaxanthins are those betalain pigments which appear yellow to orange. Among the betaxanthins present in plants include vulgaxanthin, miraxanthin, portulaxanthin, and indicaxanthin.

The physiological function of betalains in plants is uncertain, but there is some evidence that they may have fungicidal properties..

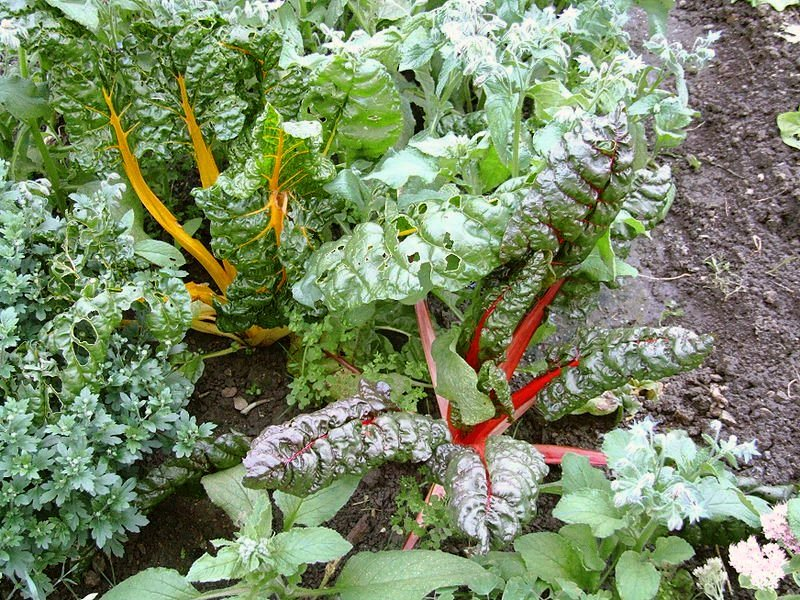
Swiss chard, showing one plant expressing yellow betaxanthins and another expressing red betacyanins

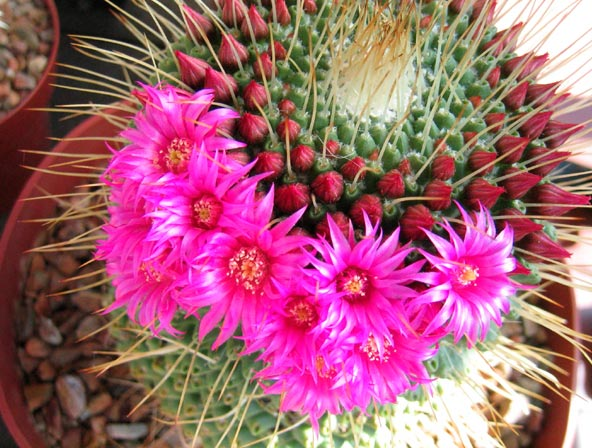
Flowers of the cactus Mammillaria sp. contain betalains.

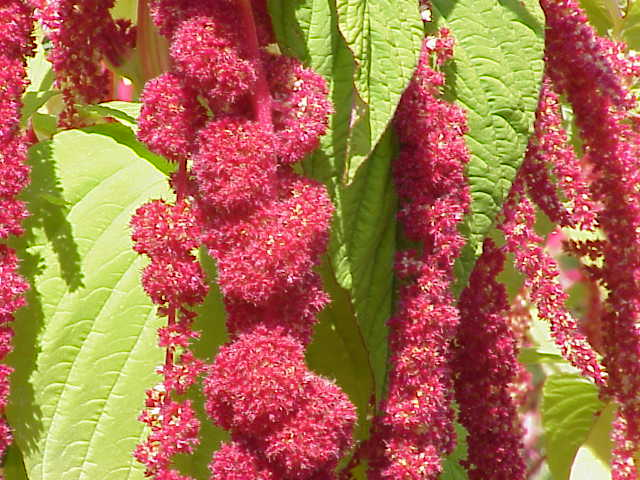
Inflorescences of Amaranthus caudatus (love-lies-bleeding) contain large quantities of betacyanins

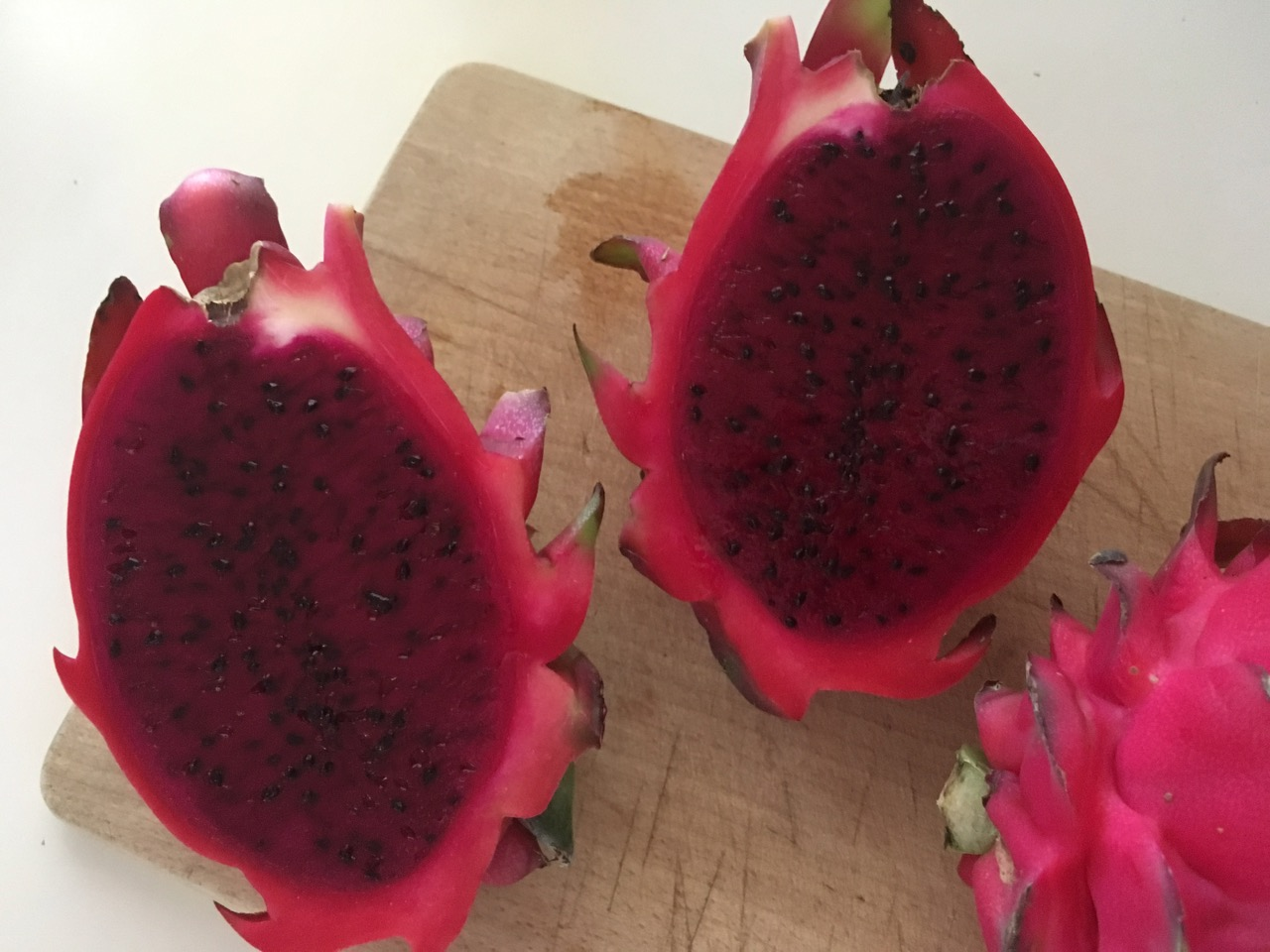
Red pitaya, also called dragon fruit, rich in betalains

== Chemistry ==
Chemical structure of betanin

Betalains (betacyanins) were first isolated and its chemical structure discovered in 1960 at the University of Zurich by Dr. Tom Mabry. It was once thought that betalains were related to anthocyanins, the reddish pigments found in most plants. Both betalains and anthocyanins are water-soluble pigments found in the vacuoles of plant cells. However, betalains are structurally and chemically unlike anthocyanins and the two have never been found in the same plant together. For example, betalains contain nitrogen whereas anthocyanins do not.

It is now known that betalains are aromatic indole derivatives synthesized from tyrosine. They are not related chemically to the anthocyanins and are not even flavonoids. Each betalain is a glycoside, and consists of a sugar and a colored portion. Their synthesis is promoted by light.

The most heavily studied betalain is betanin, also called beetroot red after the fact that it may be extracted from red beet roots. Betanin is a glucoside, and hydrolyzes into the sugar glucose and betanidin. It is used as a food coloring agent, and the color is sensitive to pH. Other betalains known to occur in beets are isobetanin, probetanin, and neobetanin. The color and antioxidant capacity of betanin and indicaxanthin (betaxanthin derived of l-proline) are affected by dielectric microwave heating. Addition of TFE (2,2,2-trifluoroethanol) is reported to improve the hydrolytic stability of some betalains in aqueous solution. Furthermore, a betanin-europium(III) complex has been used to detect calcium dipicolinate in bacterial spores, including Bacillus anthracis and B. cereus.

=== Biosynthesis ===
Betalain biosynthesis: 1. betalamic acid. 2. cyclo-dopa. 3. amine or amino acid. 4. betanidin. 5. betaxanthin.

In the first step of the biosynthetic pathway, L-tyrosine is converted to L-3,4-dihydroxyphenylalanine (l-DOPA) by 3-hydroxylation by a cytochrome P450 enzyme. For dopa, the biosynthesis branches: a) on the one hand, its oxidation occurs by a CYP enzyme to cyclo-dopa; (b) on the other hand, the aromatic ring of dopa is activated by a dopa-4,5-dioxygenase opened to seco-dopa, from which betalamic acid is formed by spantane recyclization. This then reacts spontaneously with cyclo-dopa to form betanidine on the one hand, or on the other hand after its prior glucosylation by a cyclo-dopa glucosyltransferase to red-purple betanin, the simplest betacyan. In addition, betalamic acid reacts spontaneously with various amino acids or amines to form yellow-orange colored betaxanthins (see figure). The diversity of betacyans results from different glucosylation of betanidine and its subsequent acylation with aliphatic and aromatic carboxylic acids.

=== Semisynthetic derivatives ===
(S)-Betalamic acid

Betanin extracted from the red beet was used as starting material for the semisynthesis of an artificial coumarinic betalaine. The betanin was hydrolyzed to betalamic acid, and this was coupled to 7-amino-4-methylcoumarin. The resulting betalain was applied as a fluorescent probe for the live-cell imaging of Plasmodium-infected erythrocytes.

== Taxonomic significance ==
Betalain pigments occur only in the Caryophyllales and some Basidiomycota (mushrooms), for instance Hygrophoraceae (waxcaps). Where they occur in plants, they sometimes coexist with anthoxanthins (yellow to orange flavonoids), but never occur in plant species with anthocyanins.

Among the flowering plant order Caryophyllales, most members produce betalains and lack anthocyanins. Of all the families in the Caryophyllales, only the Caryophyllaceae (carnation family) and Molluginaceae produce anthocyanins instead of betalains. The limited distribution of betalains among plants is a synapomorphy for the Caryophyllales, though their production has been lost in two families.

== Economic uses ==
Betanin is commercially used as a natural food dye. It can cause beeturia (red urine) and red feces in some people who are unable to break it down. The interest of the food industry in betalains has grown since they were identified by in vitro methods as antioxidants, which may protect against oxidation of low-density lipoproteins.

== See also ==
- Biological pigment
