= Beetroot =

Vegetable

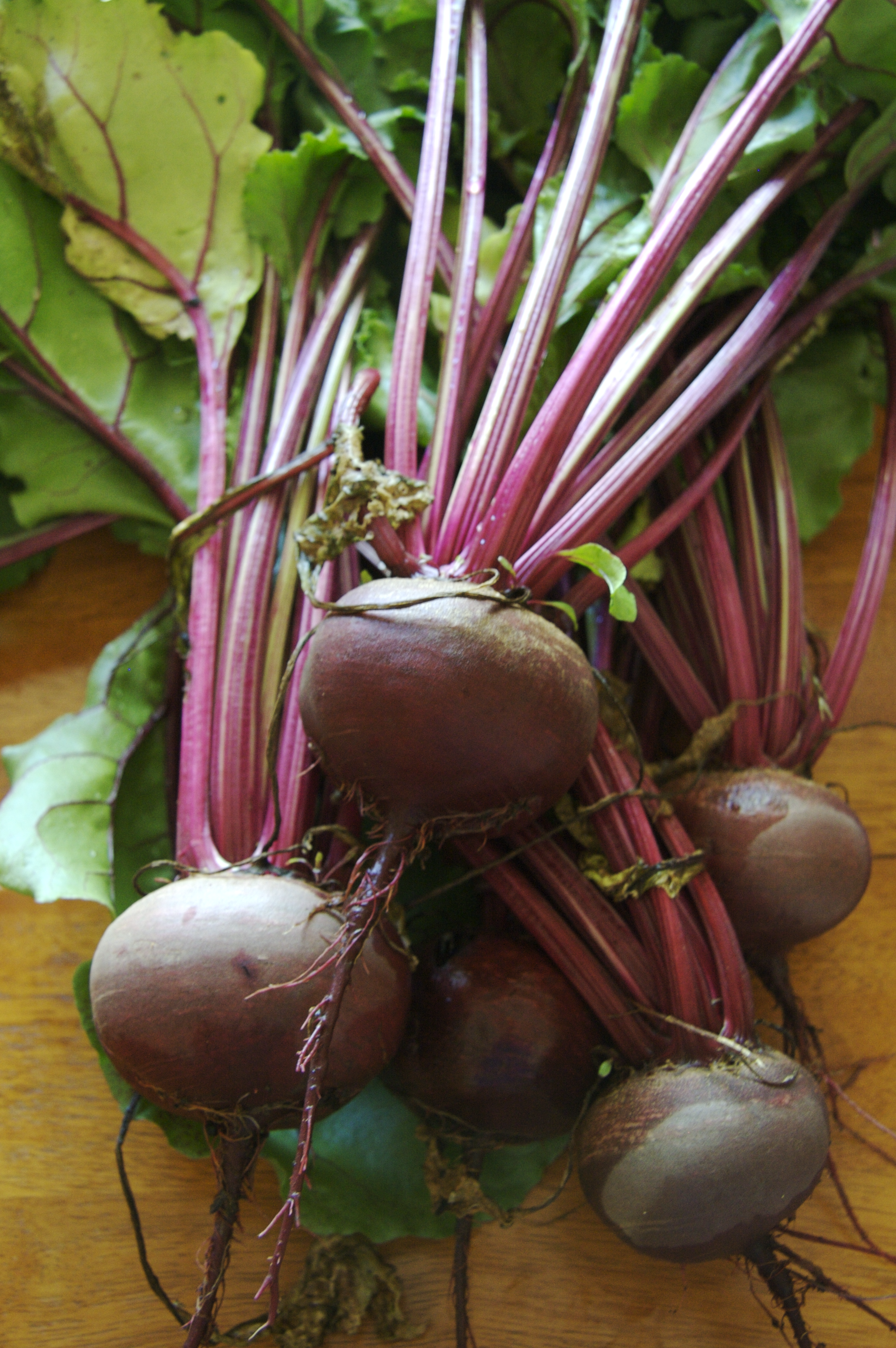
- Beetroots on the stem
- Species: Beta vulgaris
- Subspecies: Beta vulgaris subsp. vulgaris
- Cultivar group: Conditiva Group
- Origin: Sea beet (Beta vulgaris subsp. maritima)
- Cultivar group members: Many; see text.

Beetroot or beet (Note: beetroot in British English, beet in North American English) is the taproot portion of a Beta vulgaris subsp. vulgaris plant in the Conditiva Group. The plant is a root vegetable also known as the table beet, garden beet, or dinner beet, or else categorized by color as red beet or golden beet. Its leaves constitute a leaf vegetable called beet greens. It is native to the Azores, Western Europe to the Mediterranean and India. Beetroot can be eaten raw, roasted, steamed, or boiled. Beetroot can also be canned, either whole or cut up, and often are pickled, spiced, or served in a sweet-and-sour sauce.

It is one of several cultivated varieties of Beta vulgaris subsp. vulgaris grown for their edible taproots or leaves, classified as belonging to the Conditiva Group. Other cultivars of the same subspecies include the sugar beet, the leaf vegetable known as spinach beet (Swiss chard), and the fodder crop mangelwurzel.

== Etymology ==
Beta is the ancient Latin name for beetroot, possibly of Celtic origin, becoming bete in Old English. Root derives from the late Old English rōt, itself from Old Norse rót.

== History ==
The domestication of beetroot can be traced to the emergence of an allele that enables biennial harvesting of leaves and taproot. Beetroot was domesticated in the ancient Middle East, primarily for their greens, and were grown by the Ancient Egyptians, Greeks, and Romans. By the Roman era, it is thought that they were also cultivated for their roots. From the Middle Ages, beetroot was used to treat various conditions, especially illnesses relating to digestion and the blood. Bartolomeo Platina recommended taking beetroot with garlic to nullify the effects of "garlic-breath".

During the middle of the 17th century, wine often was colored with beetroot juice.

Food shortages in Europe following World War I caused great hardships, including cases of mangelwurzel disease, as relief workers called it. It was symptomatic of eating only beetroot.

Beetroot was grown in many victory gardens during World War II, in part because the species was seen as an indicator of soil pH with good growth a sign that soil acidity was not too strong.

== Archaeology ==
The archaeological record for beetroot is sparse. Identifying the recovered remains is a complicated endeavor given the morphological similarities between charred domestic and wild fruits. However, written records offer more clarity; some date back to the eighth century BC in Babylonia. By the first century BC, both Roman and Jewish texts suggest beetroots were present in the Mediterranean. Physical specimens have been found in the Third-Dynasty Saqqara pyramid at Memphis in Egypt and in the Netherlands in a Neolithic site. Charred remains from Roman sites in Germany are more significant, since they provide strong physical evidence of evidence-based domestication.

== Culinary use ==
Usually, the deep purple roots of beetroot are eaten boiled, roasted, or raw, and either alone or combined with any salad vegetable. The green, leafy portion of the beetroot is also edible. The young leaves can be added raw to salads, while the mature leaves are most commonly served boiled or steamed, in which case they have a taste and texture similar to spinach. Beetroot can be roasted, boiled or steamed, peeled, and then eaten warm with or without butter; cooked, pickled, and then eaten cold as a condiment; or peeled, shredded raw, and then eaten as a salad. Pickled beetroot is a traditional food in many countries. It is commonly processed using brine fermentation to produce sweet, salty and tangy, crisp live culture pickles. Beetroot can also be used to make beetroot cake.

=== Australia and New Zealand ===
In Australia and New Zealand, sliced pickled beetroot is a common ingredient in traditional hamburgers.

=== Eastern Europe ===
In Eastern Europe, beetroot soup, such as borscht [Ukrainian] and barszcz czerwony [Polish], is common. In Ukraine, a related dish called shpundra is also common; this hearty beetroot stew, often made with pork belly or ribs, is sometimes referred to as a thicker version of borscht. In Poland and Ukraine, beetroot is combined with horseradish to form ćwikła or бурячки (buryachky), which is traditionally eaten with cold cuts and sandwiches, but often also added to a meal consisting of meat and potatoes.

Similarly, in Serbia, beetroot (referred to by the local name cvekla) is used as a winter salad, seasoned with salt and vinegar, with meat dishes.

As an addition to horseradish, it is also used to produce the "red" variety of chrain, a condiment in Ashkenazi Jewish, Hungarian, Polish, Lithuanian, Russian, and Ukrainian cuisine.

Cold beetroot soup called šaltibarščiai is often eaten in Lithuania. Traditionally it consists of kefir, boiled beetroot, cucumber, dill, spring onions and can be eaten with boiled eggs and potatoes.

Botvinya is a traditional Russian cold soup made from leftover beet greens and chopped beetroots, typically with bread and kvass added. Botvinya got its name from the Russian botva, which means "root vegetable greens", referring to beet plant leaves.

Svekolnik, or svyokolnik, is another Russian beet-based soup, typically distinguished from borscht in that vegetables for svekolnik are cooked raw and not sautéed, while many types of borscht typically include sautéed carrots and other vegetables. Svekolnik got its name from svyokla, the Russian word for "beet." Sometimes, various types of cold borscht are also called "svekolnik".

=== India ===
In Indian cuisine, chopped, cooked, spiced beetroot is a common side dish. Yellow-colored beetroots are grown on a very small scale for home consumption.

=== North America ===
Besides standard fruit and vegetable dishes, certain varieties of beets are sometimes used as a garnish to a tart. Beetroot juice is a base in the Colimense tuba compuesta.

=== Northern Europe ===
A common dish in Sweden and elsewhere in the Nordic countries is biff à la Lindström, a variant of meatballs or burgers, with chopped or grated beetroot added to the minced meat. Swedish pyttipanna is also traditionally served with pickled beetroot.

In Northern Germany, beetroot is mashed with Labskaus or added as its side dish.

== Industrial production and other uses ==
A large proportion of commercial production is processed into boiled and sterilized beetroot or pickles.

Betanin, obtained from the roots, is used industrially as red food colorant to enhance the color and flavor of tomato paste, sauces, desserts, jams and jellies, ice cream, candy, and breakfast cereals. When beetroot juice is used, it is most stable in foods with low water content, such as frozen novelties and fruit fillings.

Beetroot can be used to make wine.

== Nutrition ==
Beetroot, raw
Nutritional value per 100 g (3.5 oz)
- Energy: 180 kJ (43 kcal)
- Carbohydrates: 9.56 g
- Sugars: 6.76 g
- Dietary fiber: 2.8 g
- Fat: 0.17 g
- Protein: 1.61 g
Vitamins and minerals
Vitamins	Quantity %DV^{†}
Vitamin A equiv. beta-Carotene	0% 2 μg 0% 20 μg
Thiamine (B1)	3% 0.031 mg
Riboflavin (B2)	3% 0.04 mg
Niacin (B3)	2% 0.334 mg
Pantothenic acid (B5)	3% 0.155 mg
Vitamin B6	4% 0.067 mg
Folate (B9)	27% 109 μg
Vitamin C	5% 4.9 mg
Minerals	Quantity %DV^{†}
Calcium	1% 16 mg
Copper	8% 0.075 mg
Iron	4% 0.8 mg
Magnesium	5% 23 mg
Manganese	14% 0.329 mg
Phosphorus	3% 40 mg
Potassium	11% 325 mg
Sodium	3% 78 mg
Zinc	3% 0.35 mg
- Other constituents: Quantity
- Water: 87.58g
- Link to USDA Database entry
- ^{†}Percentages estimated using US recommendations for adults, except for potassium, which is estimated based on expert recommendation from the National Academies.

Raw beetroot is 88% water, 10% carbohydrates, 2% protein, and less than 1% fat. In a 100-gram (3 1/2-ounce) amount providing 43 calories of food energy, raw beetroot is a rich source (27% of the Daily Value, DV) of folate and a moderate source of manganese and potassium (11-14% DV), with other micronutrients at low content (table).

=== Nitrate ===
Beets tend to accumulate nitrates from soil. Excessive nitrates pose a risk to health because they can be converted into nitrosamine in the human stomach. On the other hand, an appropriate amount of nitrates is responsible for the blood-pressure-lowering effect of beetroot juice (see above) and possible other health benefits. In any case, it would be desirable to have a way to remove excess nitrates from beetroot juice.

Paracoccus denitrificans (Pd) bacterium can break down the nitrates, but an intermediate of the breakdown is nitrite, which leads to a risk of nitrosamine formation during denitrification by Pd. Adding ascorbic acid prevents nitrosamine formation in this bacterial process, ensuring safe removal of nitrates. Denitrifying concentrated beet juice requires halophilic bacteria due to the higher osmotic concentration, with Nesterenkonia halobia (formerly Micrococcus halobius) being the most efficient out of three species tested.

== Pigment ==
The red colour compound betanin is a betalain in the category of betacyanins. It is not broken down in the body, but excreted in urine and stools.

In higher concentrations, this may temporarily cause urine or stools to assume a reddish colour, in the case of urine a condition called beeturia. Although harmless, this effect may cause initial concern as a medical problem due to a visual similarity with blood in the stool, blood passing through the anus (hematochezia), or blood in the urine (hematuria).

== Cultivars ==
Below is a list of several commonly available cultivars of beetroot. Generally, 55 to 65 days are needed from germination to harvest of the root. All cultivars can be harvested earlier for use as greens. Unless otherwise noted, the root colors are shades of red and dark red, with different degrees of zoning noticeable in slices.

- 'Action', gained the RHS's Award of Garden Merit (AGM) in 1993.
- 'Albino', heirloom (white root)
- 'Alto', AGM, 2005.
- 'Bettollo', AGM, 2016.
- 'Boltardy', AGM, 1993.
- 'Bona', AGM, 2016.
- 'Boro', AGM, 2005.
- 'Bull's Blood', heirloom
- 'Cheltenham Green Top', AGM, 1993.
- 'Chioggia,' heirloom (distinct red and white zoned root)
- 'Crosby's Egyptian,' heirloom
- 'Cylindra' / 'Formanova,' heirloom (elongated root)
- 'Detroit Dark Red Medium Top,' heirloom
- 'Early Wonder', heirloom
- 'Forono', AGM, 1993.
- 'Golden Beet' / 'Burpee's Golden', heirloom (yellow root)
- 'MacGregor's Favorite', an heirloom carrot-shaped beetroot
- 'Pablo', AGM, 1993.
- 'Perfected Detroit', 1934 AAS winner
- 'Red Ace', hybrid, AGM, 2001.
- 'Rubidus', AGM, 2005.
- 'Ruby Queen', 1957 AAS winner
- 'Solo', AGM, 2005.
- 'Touchstone Gold', (yellow root)
- 'Wodan', AGM, 1993.

== Gallery ==
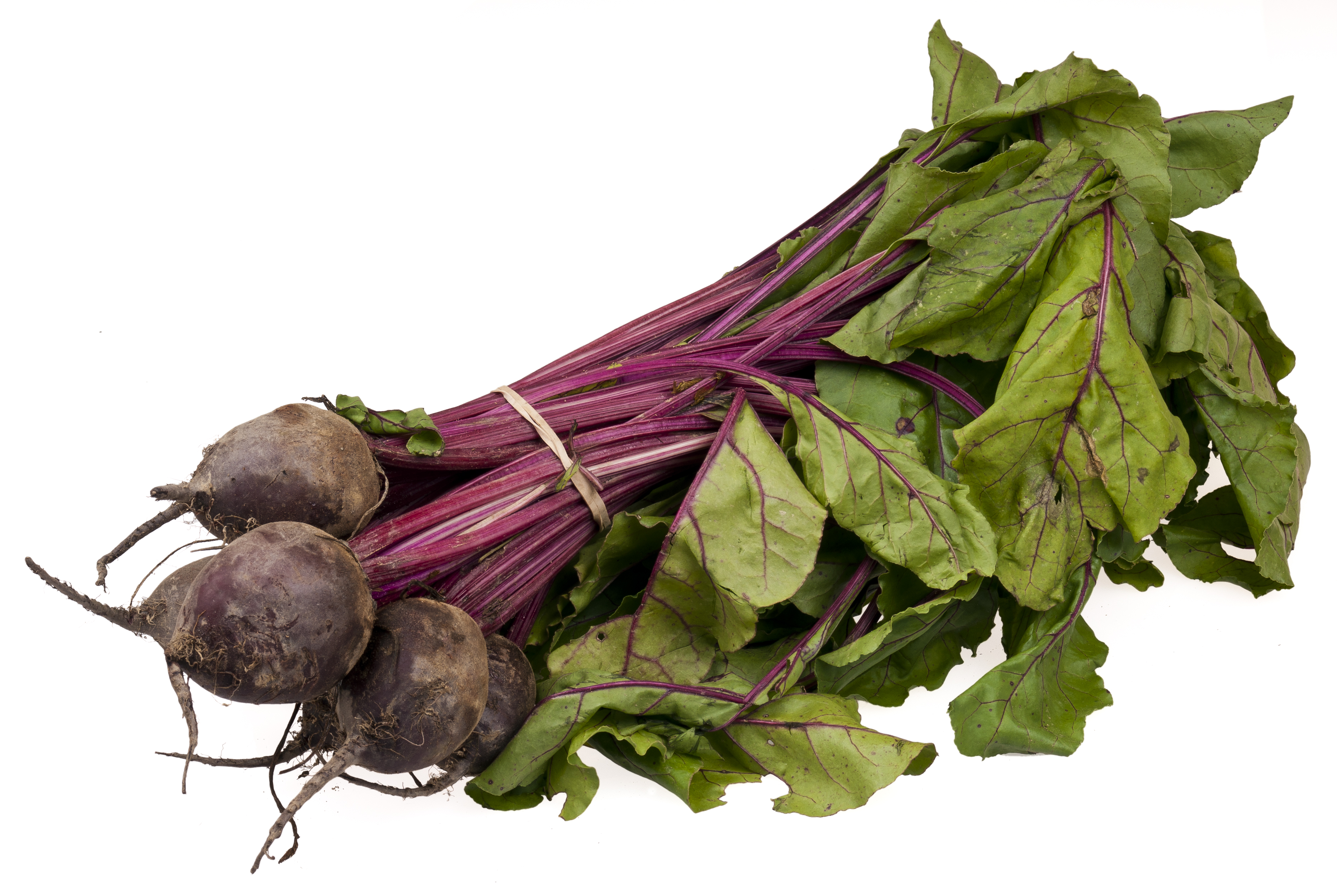
A bundle of beetroot

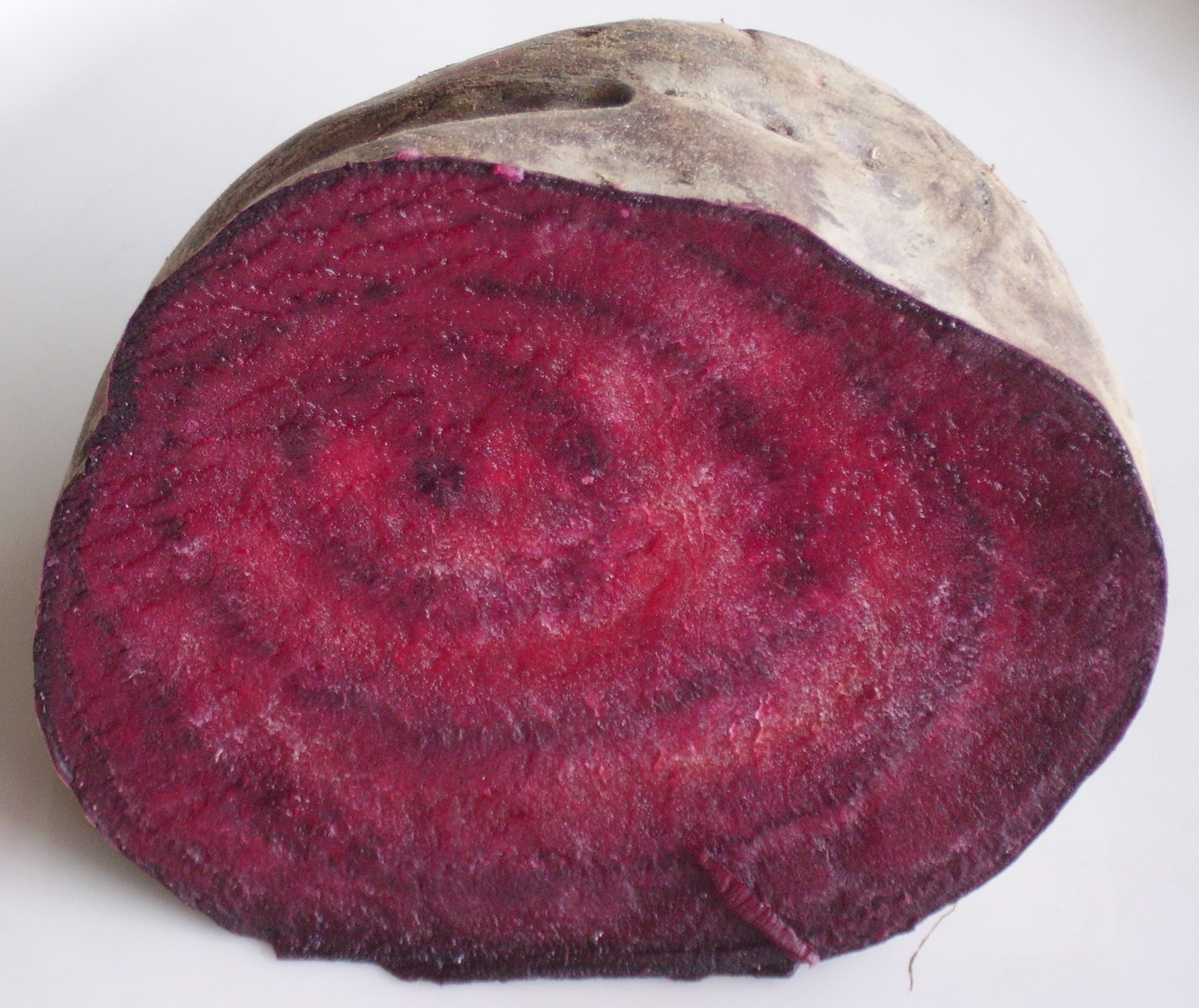
Section through taproot

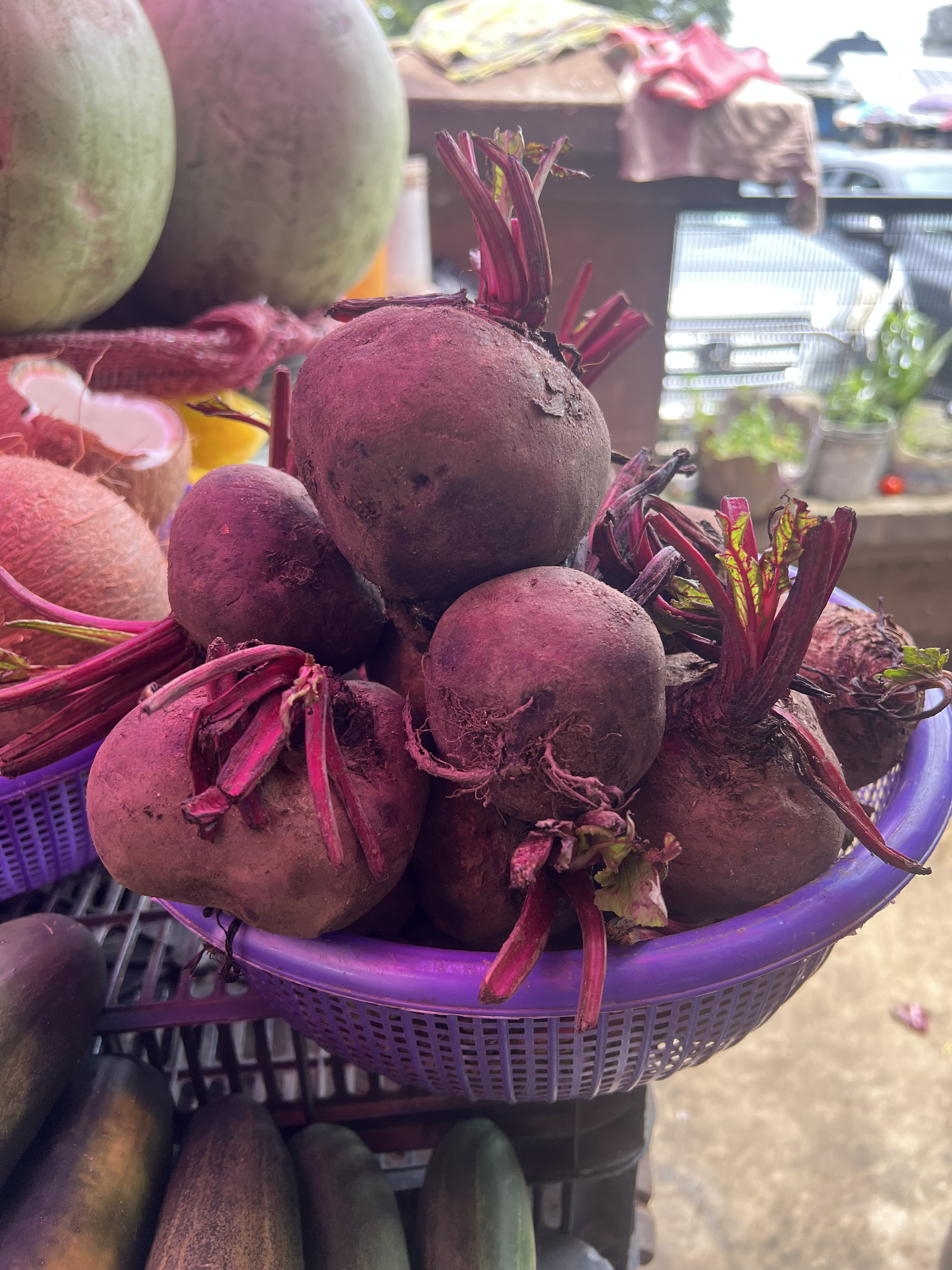

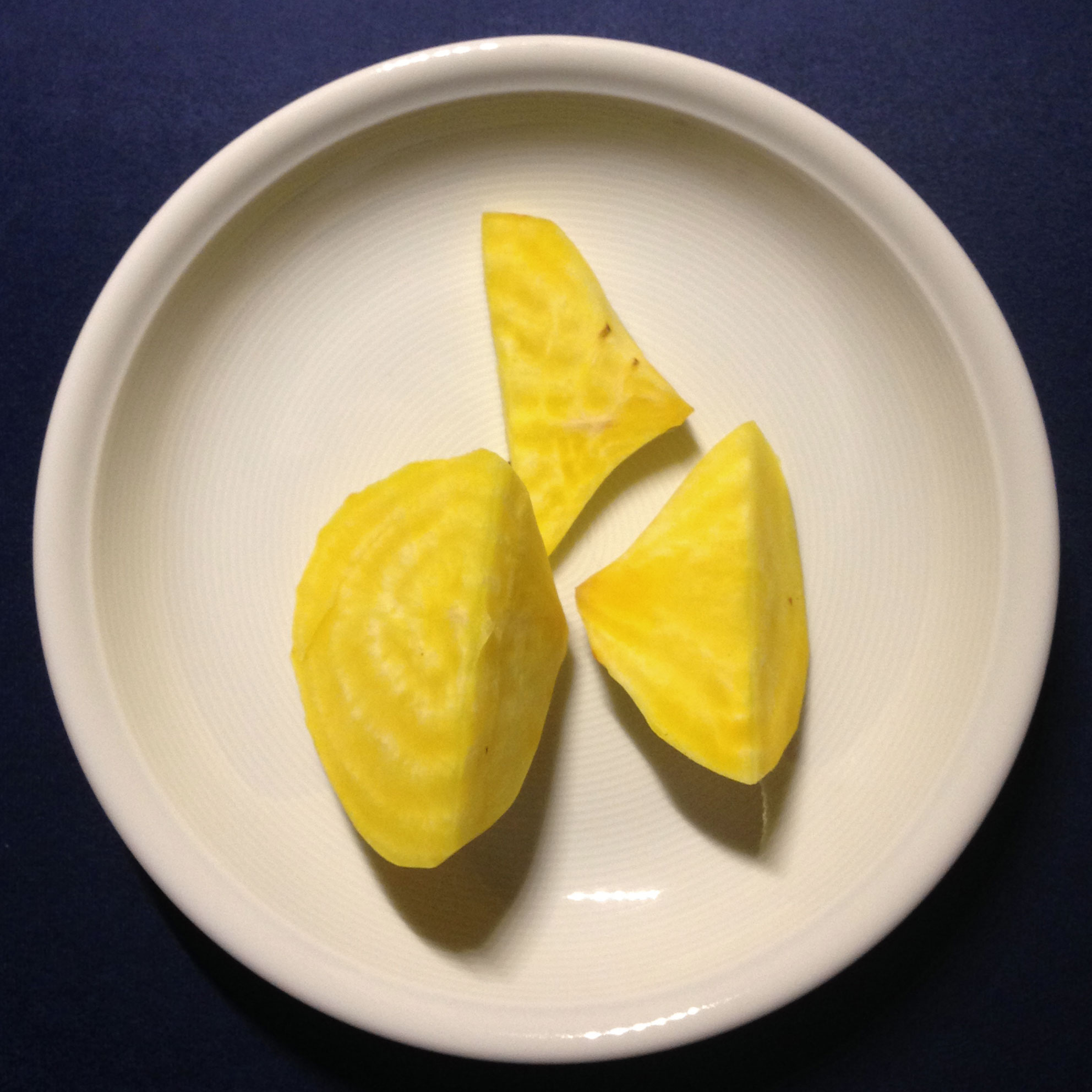
Yellow beetroot

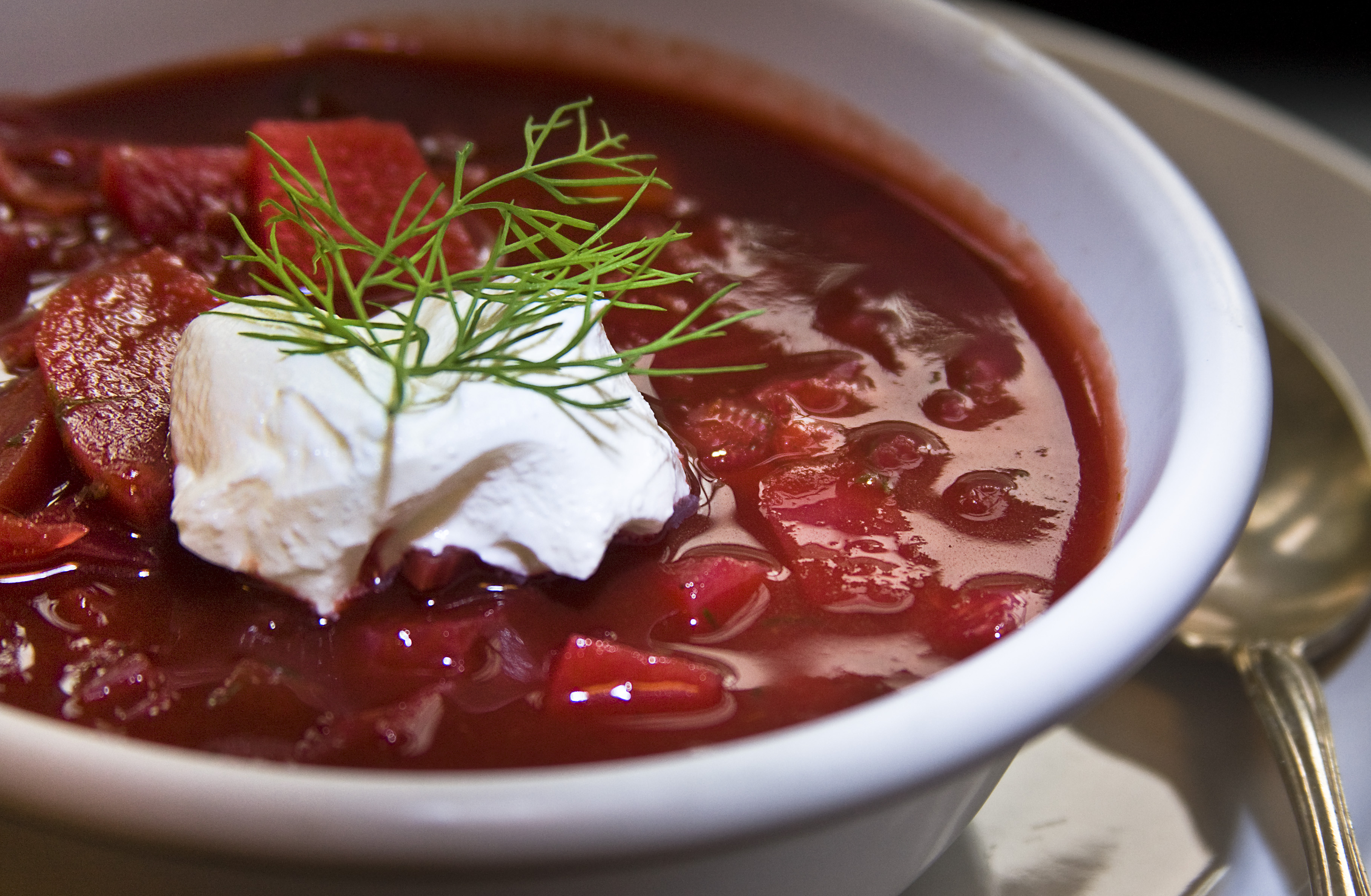
Borscht

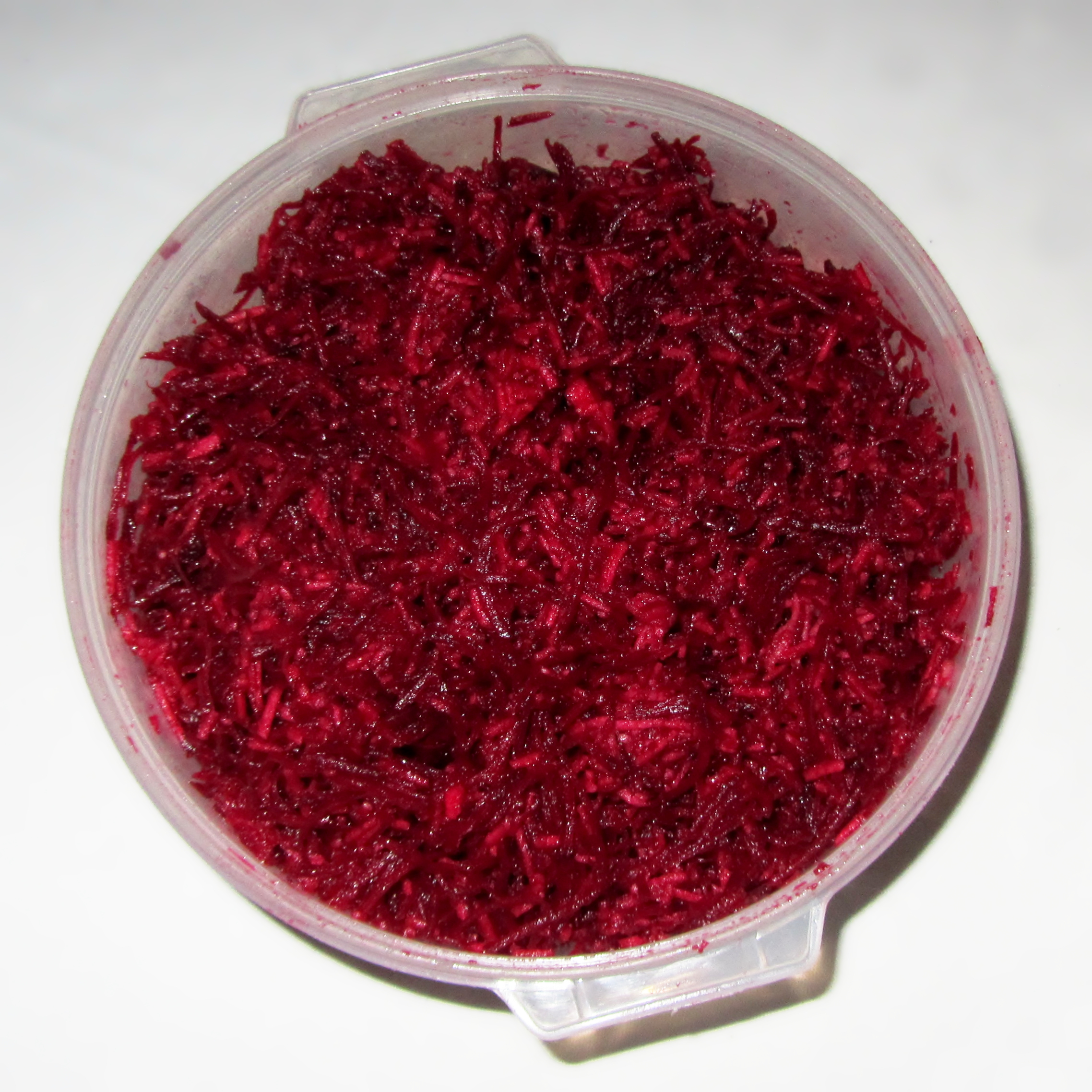
Salad of grated beetroot and apple

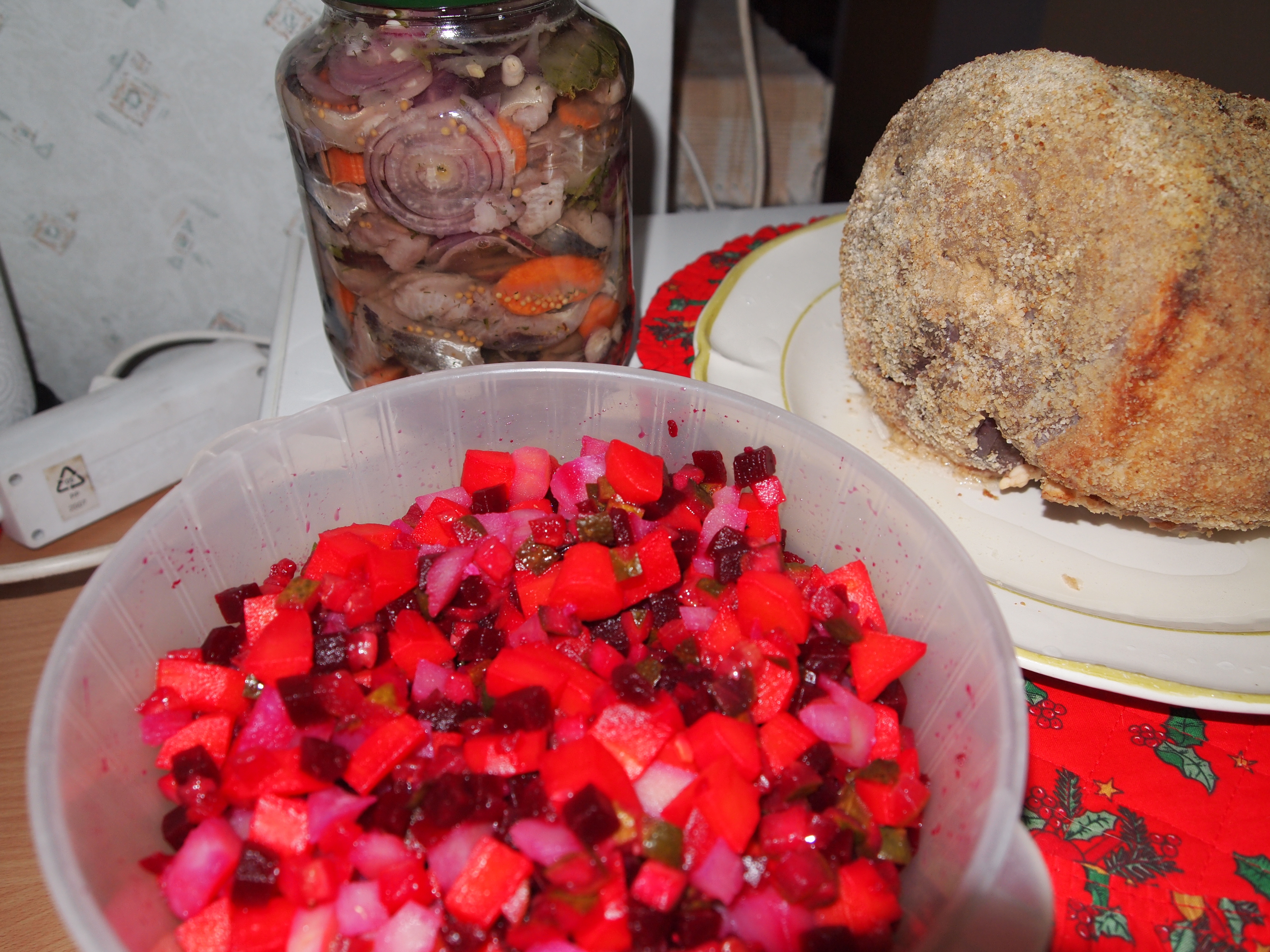
Finnish rosolli

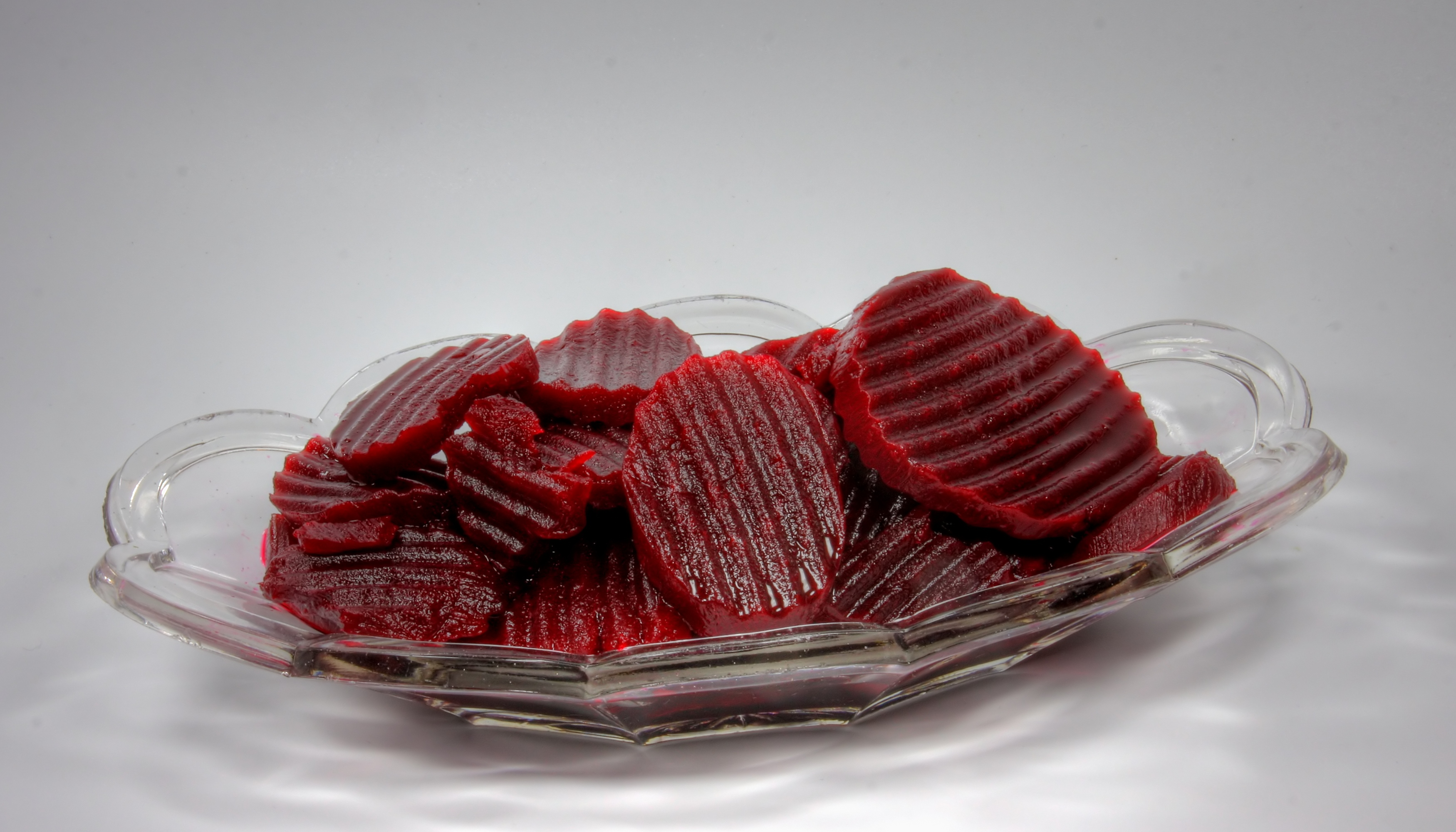
Sliced, pickled beetroot

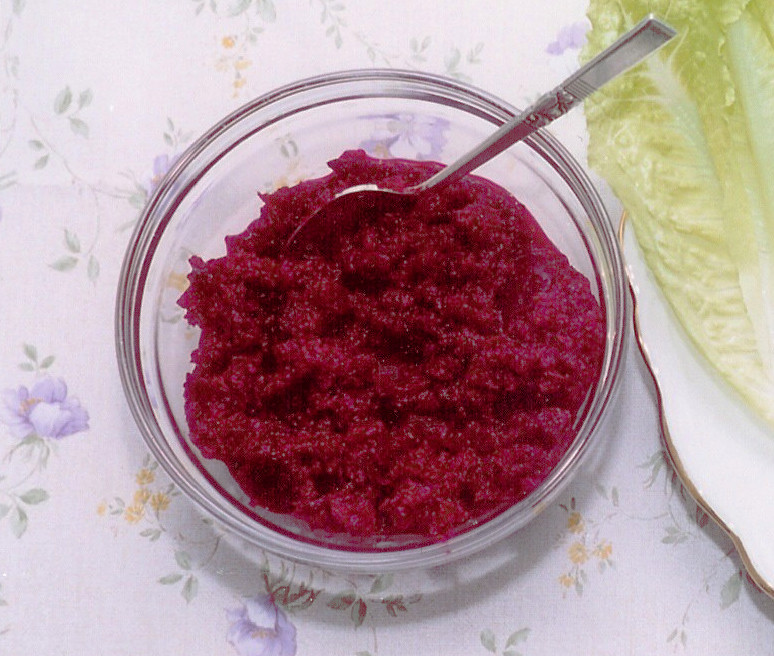
Red chrain is made with beetroot.

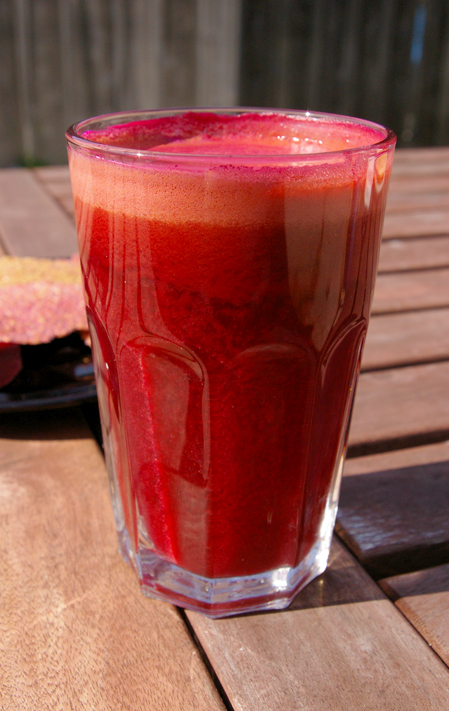
Beetroot juice

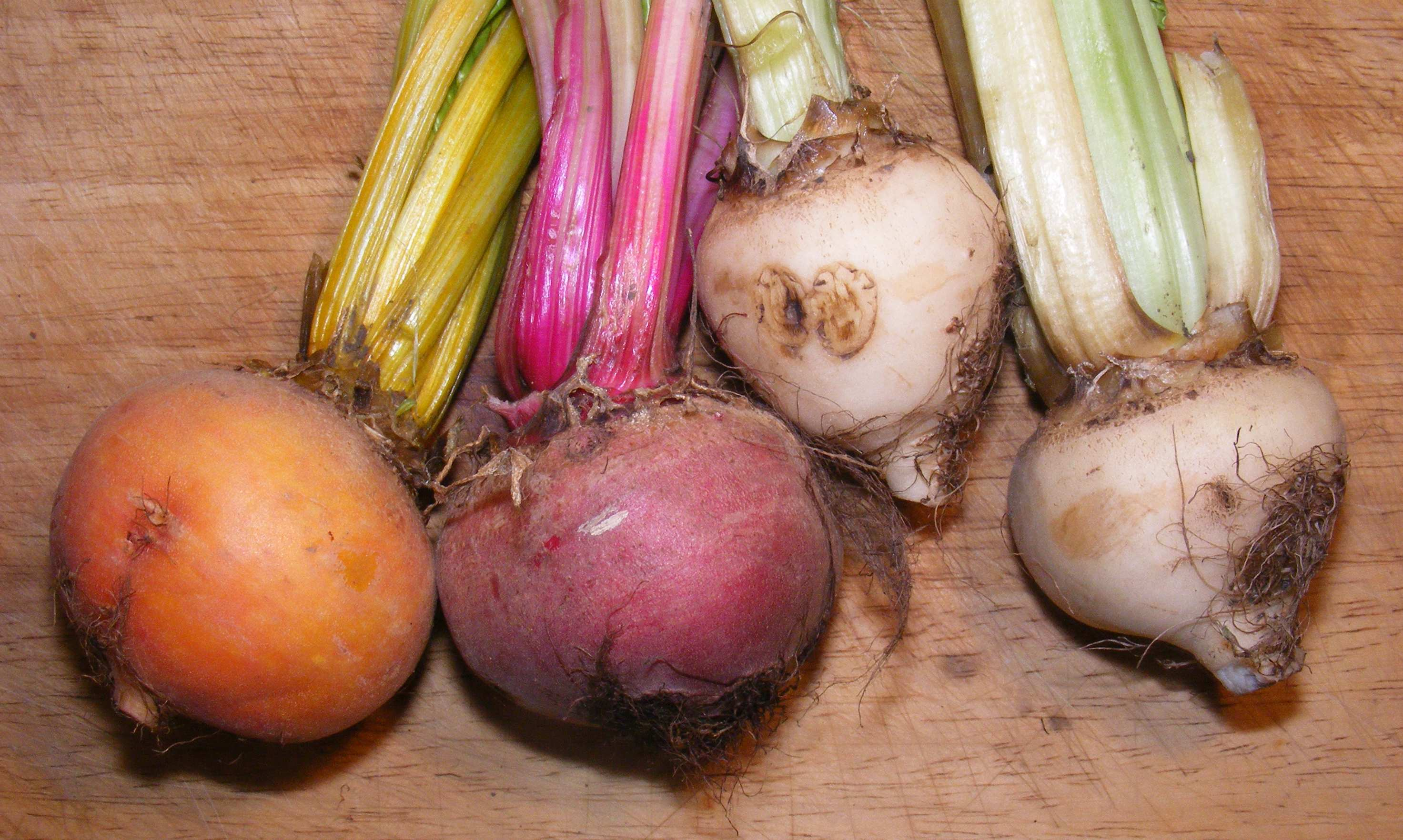
Golden, red, and white beetroots (left to right)

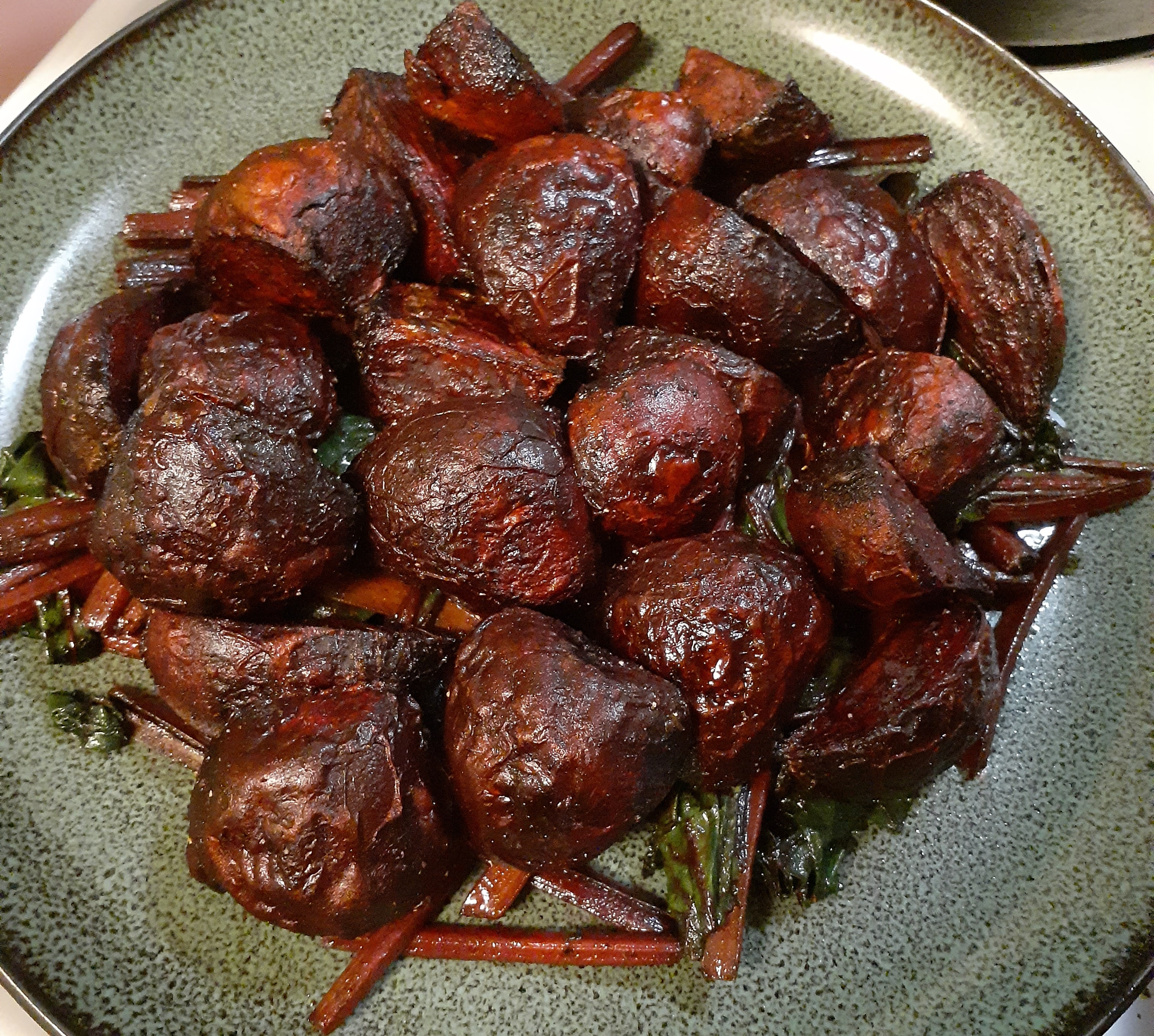
Roasted beetroot

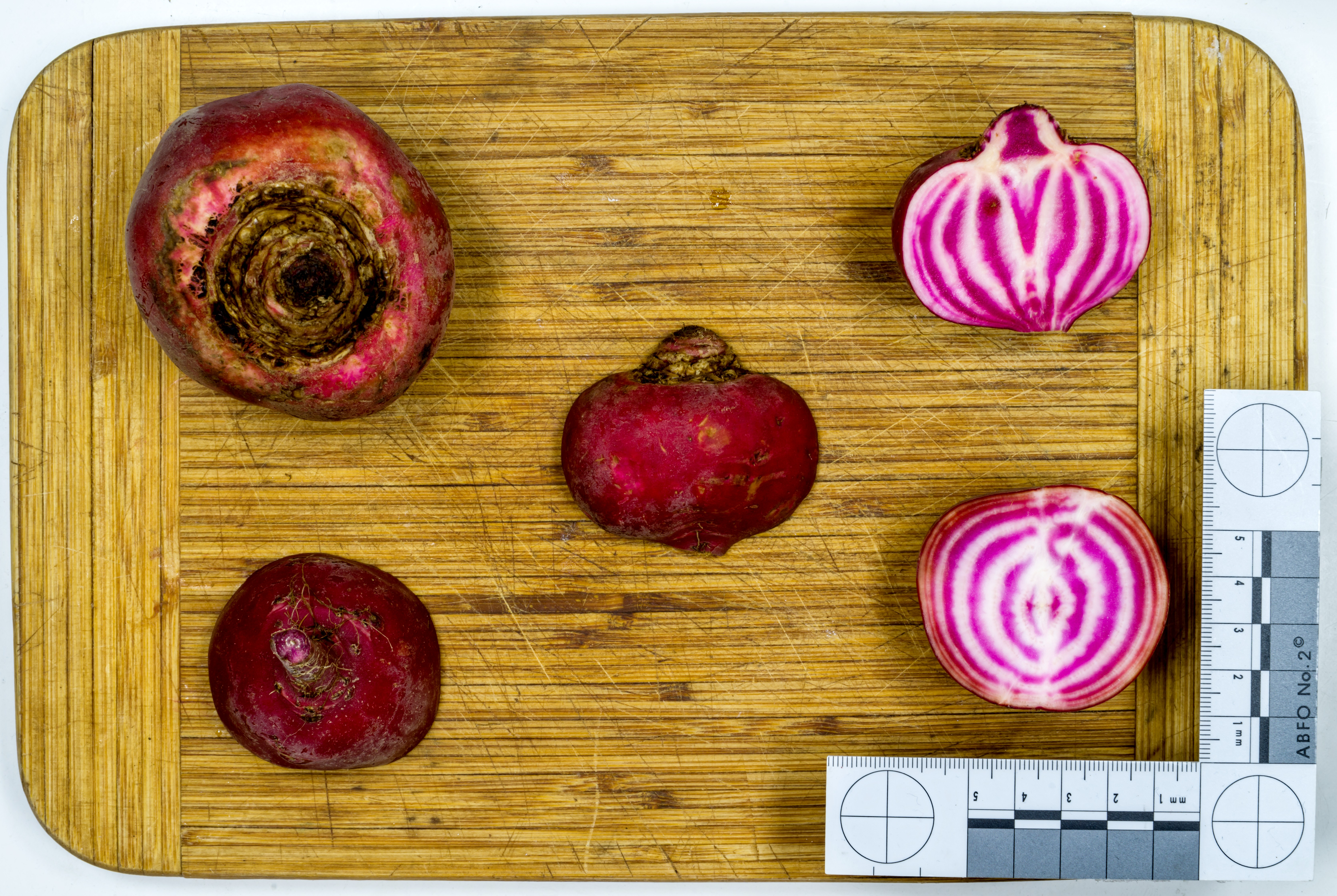
Root and cross-section of cultivar 'Chioggia'

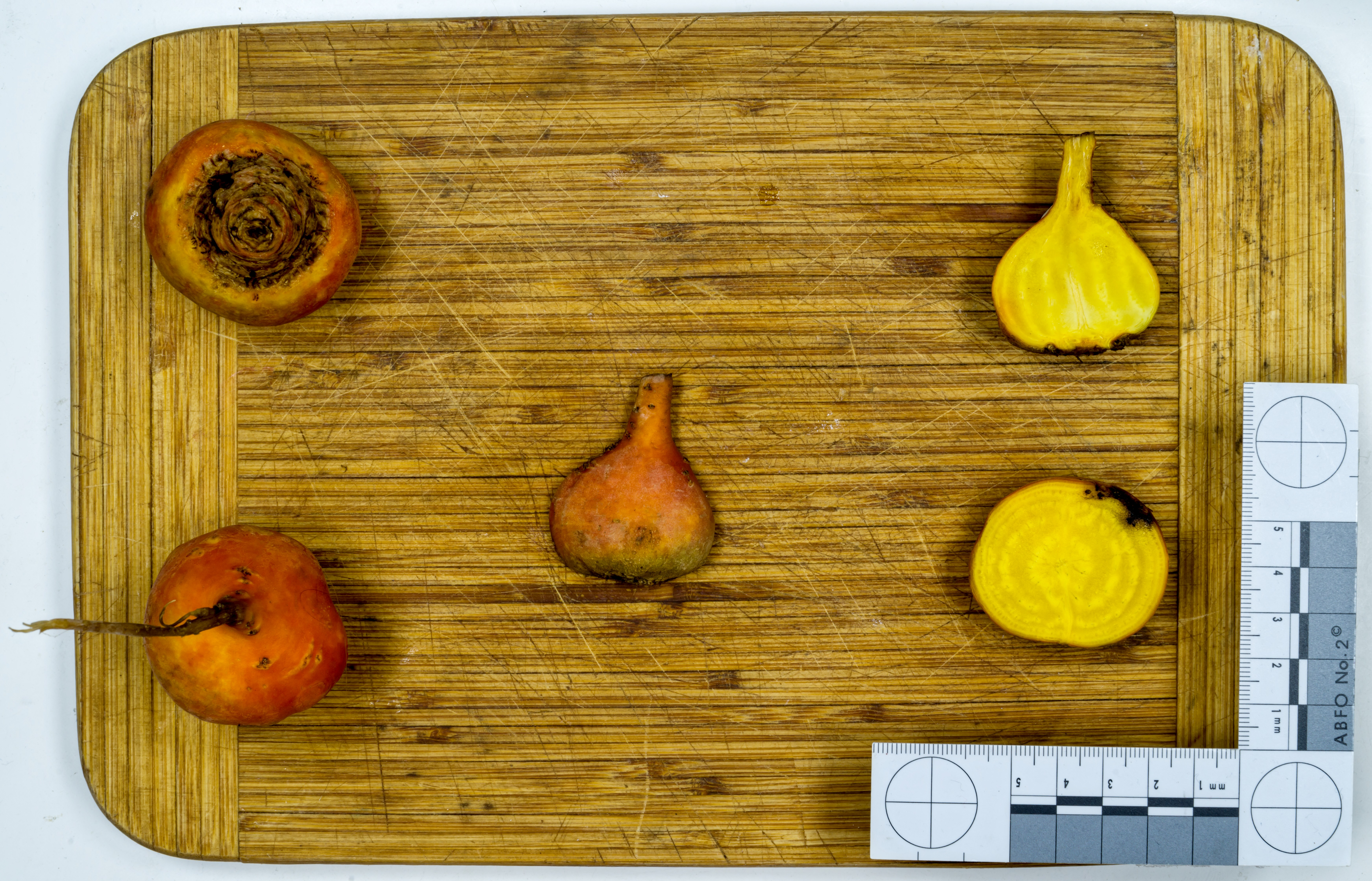
Root and cross-section of a yellow cultivar

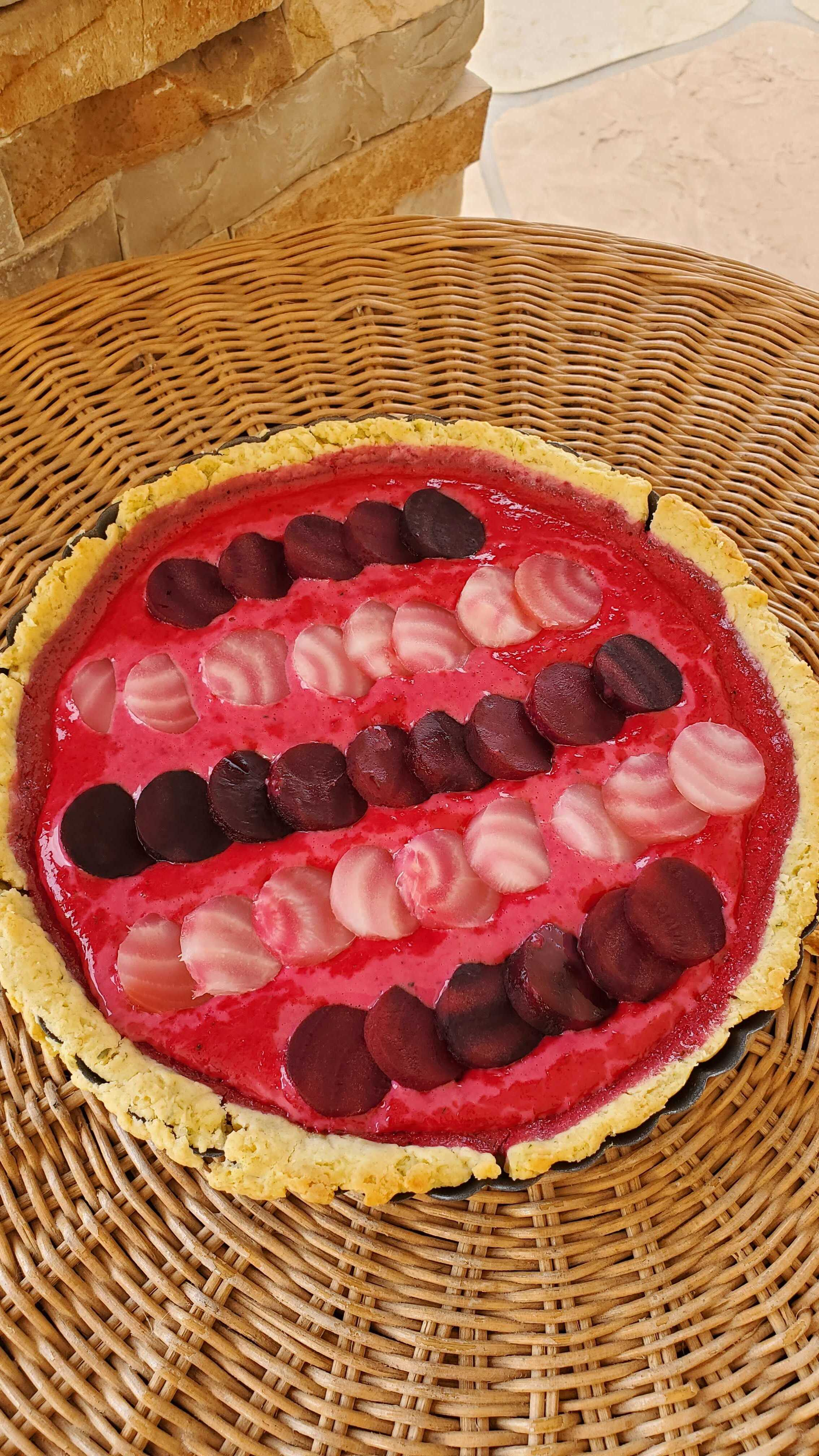
Chioggia beet tart

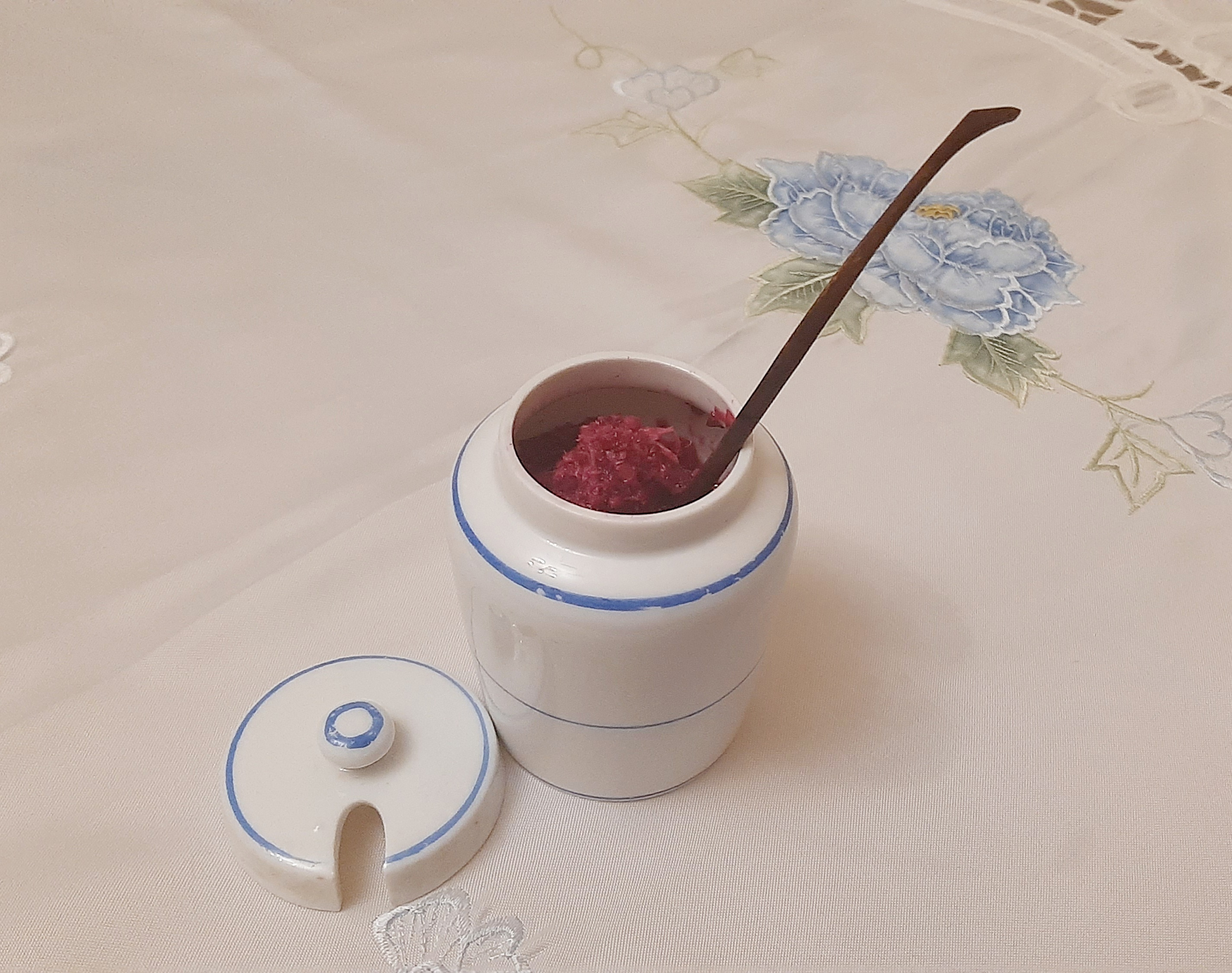
Grated horseradish with beetroot

Steamed beetroot with spaghetti pasta
