= Sansour =

Sansour is a surname and may refer to:

- Larissa Sansour (born 1973), Palestinian visual artist who resides in London
- Leila Sansour, Russian-born Palestinian founder and CEO of Open Bethlehem
- Vivien Sansour (born 1978), Palestinian visual artist and founder of the Palestine Heirloom Seed Library
