= Siberian tomato =

Tomato variety

Siberian tomato is a type of the common tomato plant (Solanum lycopersicum). It is referred to as "Siberian" because it can set fruit at 38 °F (3 °C), although it is not particularly frost hardy, despite its name.

== Summary ==
In 1984, William Bonsall introduced the seed for this variety of tomato to the Seed Savers Exchange Yearbook. When the tomato was first domesticated is unknown. However, it was known to grow in Southern Mexico in 500 BC. This variety grows well in most parts of North America.

This type of tomato is very robust and versatile, which makes it best for canning or processing. They are small, bright red tomatoes growing from 6–8 feet (1.8–2.4 m) tall. They are of the heirloom variety of tomato.
