= Chha trob =

Cambodian stir fry dish

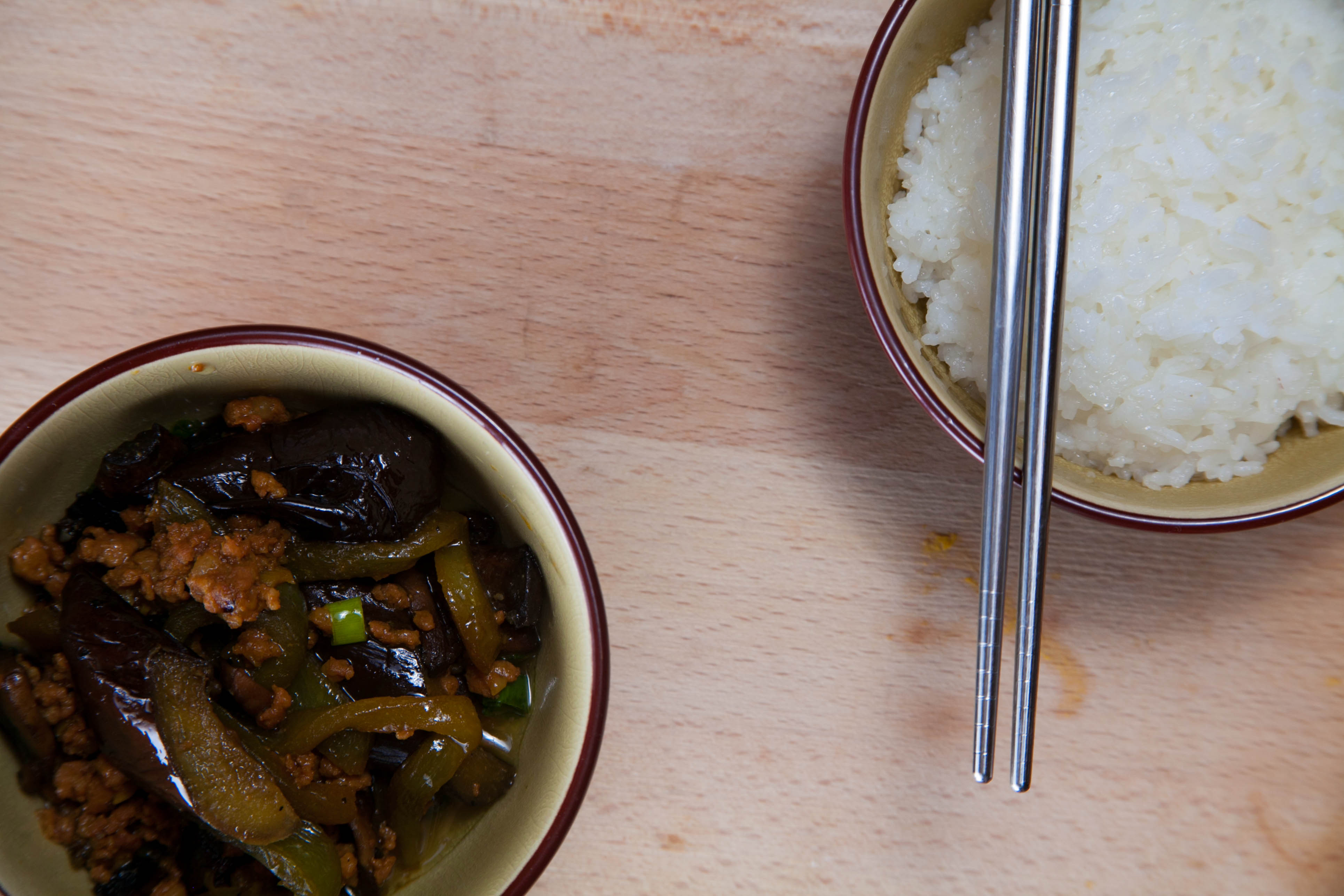
- Chha trob with a bowl of steamed rice
- Alternative names: dot trob, cha traop dot
- Place of origin: Cambodia
- Created by: Cambodian cuisine
- Serving temperature: Hot
- Main ingredients: Eggplant, minced pork, oyster sauce, and fermented soybeans
- Food energy (per serving): 338–426

Chha trob (Khmer: ឆាត្រប់) or dot trob (ដុតត្រប់) is a Cambodian dish made out of chargrilled eggplants with minced pork and fermented soybeans stir-fried in oyster sauce and garnished with spring onions. It is a typical dish from the Kampuchea Krom region in Mekong Delta.

== Name ==
The full name of the dish is trob dot chha sach chrouk chenh chram (ត្រប់ដុតឆាសាច់ជ្រូកចិញ្ច្រាំ, lit. 'roasted eggplant with fried minced pork'), which is often shortened to chha trob (ឆាត្រប់, lit. 'fried eggplant') or more correctly dot trob (ដុតត្រប់, lit. 'roasted eggplant') since minced pork is the ingredient that's stir-fried, not the eggplant, which is grilled or barbecued instead.

== Variations ==
Instead of oyster sauce, fish sauce can be used as well, but minced pork can be combined with chopped shrimp or chicken or substituted with crumbled tofu or ground plant-based meat for a vegan version that also replaces fish sauce with Hoisin sauce. The eggplant can also be smoked on charcoal or wood pellets in a barbecue or broiled in the oven. Chha trob is served with steamed rice and sometimes also garnished with coriander leaves.
