= Kyoyasai =

Vegetables originating in Kyoto

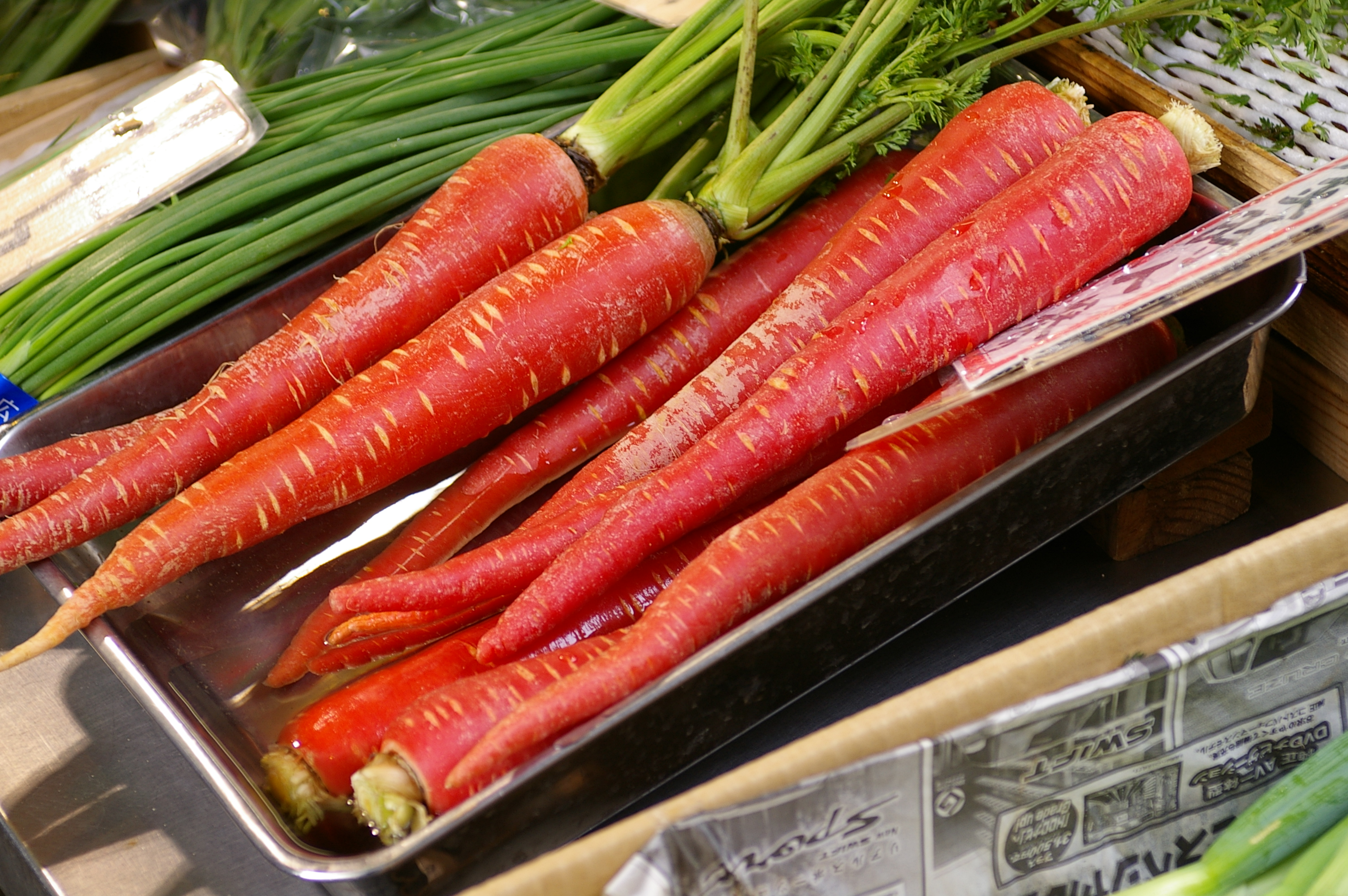
Kintoki carrots

Kyōyasai (京野菜 "Kyoto vegetables") are heirloom vegetables originating in Japan's Kyoto Prefecture. According to the research of the Laboratory of Health and Environment of Kyoto, kyōyasai have more minerals, fibers and vitamins, as well as nutrients that repair DNA than other vegetables. They are relatively expensive, and Japanese consumers consider many kyōyasai strange, because of their appearance.

== Use ==
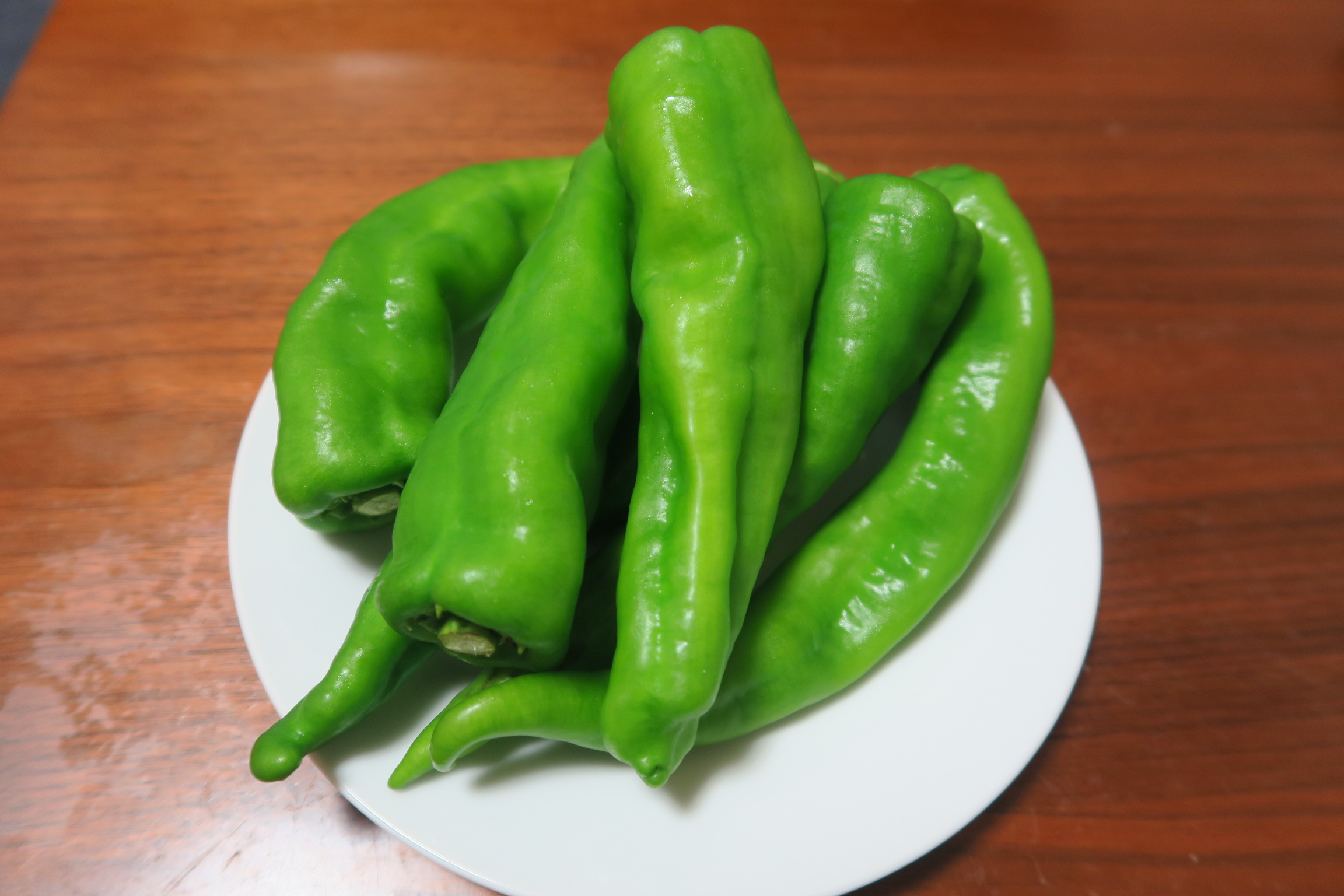
Mangan-ji green peppers

Kyo-yasai are eaten mostly in the home or in upscale restaurants. They play an important role in Kyo-ryori, the traditional cuisine of Kyoto.

Kyo-ryori does not employ seasoning. Traditionally, Kyo-yasai are prepared without seasoning because of their rich flavor.

Kyo-yasai are also used for Italian, French and other cuisines in Kyoto.

== History ==
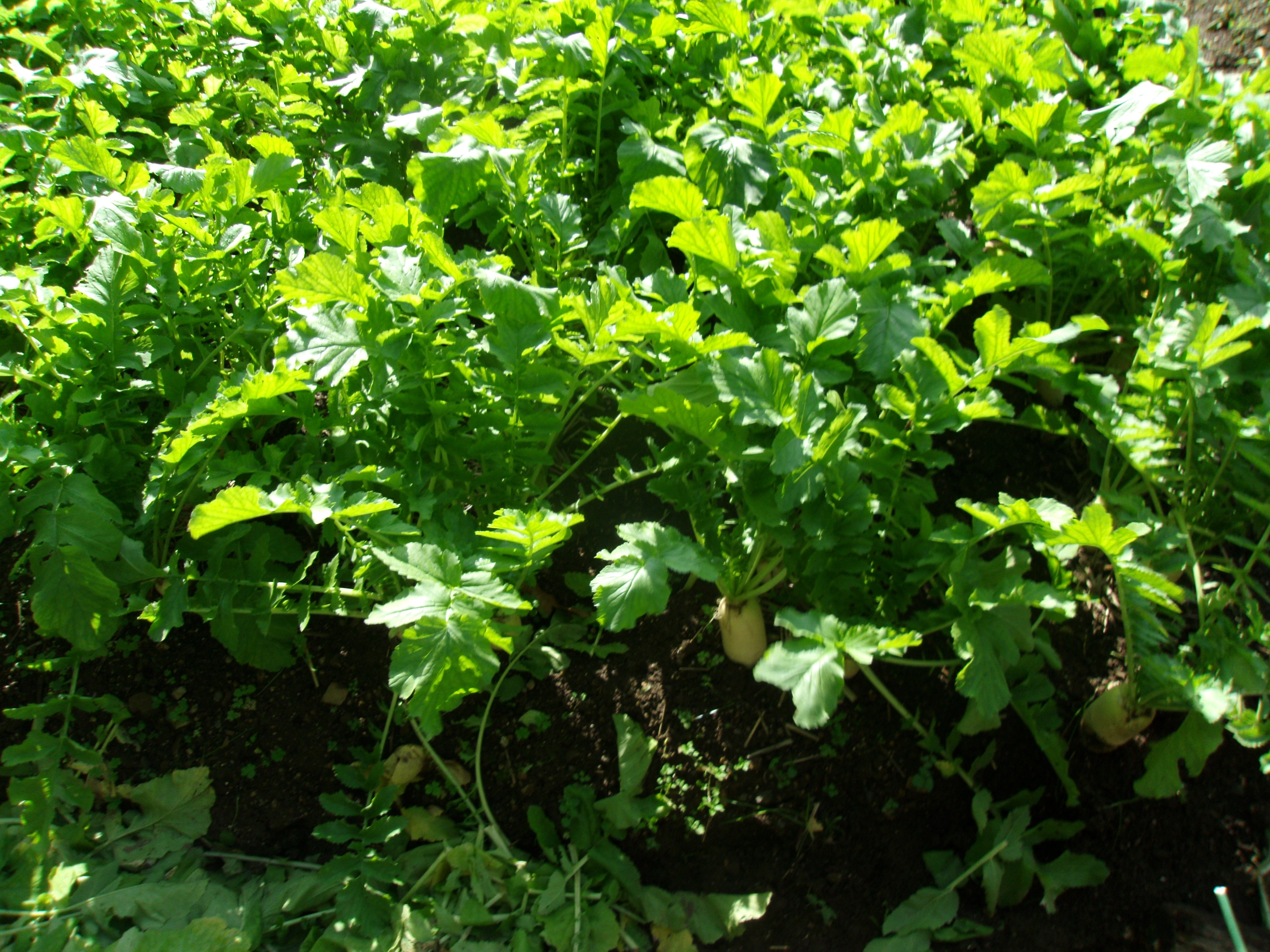
Kyoto daikon radishes

Agriculture began in Kyoto some twelve thousand years ago. It was the ancient capital of Japan and the home to the aristocracy. They supported a market for high-grade food. Kyoto is surrounded by mountains, making it difficult to transport seafood to the area. Instead, people cultivated the most delicious vegetables possible. The climate and soil quality contributed to making delicious vegetables.

In the Kamakura period, Zen Buddhism became popular. At that time Kyoto hosted many temples. Many practiced syōjin ryōri, a Buddhist vegetarian diet. This improved the quality of vegetables and preparation methods.

In 1960 the name Kyō-yasai was adopted. In the 1970s the vegetables lost popularity as imported vegetables replaced them. Such vegetables were easier to cook than Kyō-yasai, leaving Kyō-yasai on the verge of extinction.

Kyoto-area growers improved their products so that people could easily cook them. They made them smaller without losing flavor and spread new methods of cooking. Administrative organizations cooperated with agricultural and distribution organizations, attempting to increase sales of Kyō-yasai. In 1989, they started to certify Kyō-yasai as name-brand products. They also promoted Kyō-yasai to other cities.

== Definition ==
The most general definition covers all vegetables grown in Kyoto prefecture. More limited definitions include: Dentou no Kyō-yasai (Traditional Kyo-yasai) that originated before the Meiji period and were grown throughout Kyoto. Bracken, springs^{[?]}, extinct species and bamboo are also included according to the agricultural cooperative JA Kyoto. In this sense they are a type of heirloom vegetable This provision was made in 1988.

Nineteen species are included.

== Marketing by A-Coop Kyoto and JA Kyoto ==
A-Coop Kyoto and JA Kyoto made efforts to build a commercial market around Kyo-yasai, including 39 species. A survey found that Kyotans recognize Kyo-yasai as “traditional and historical food,” and most consumer emphasize its brand more than its flavor and nutrition. Kyoto City government started promoting the foods in 1998 followed shortly by Kyoto Prefecture also promoting Kyo-yasai foods in 1999.

Kyoto City appoints following 41 products as “Kyo-no-shunyasai (Kyoto vegetables in season):”

- Tomatoes
- Kyo temari
- Eggplants
- Kamo eggplant
- Cucumbers
- Green soybeans
- Sando beans
- Takagamine pepper
- Green pepper
- Bamboo
- Strawberries
- Garden peas
- Fruit garden peas
- Sweet corn
- Leaf peppers
- Sobana
- Long Japanese radishes
- Turnips
- Big turnips
- Spinach
- Garland chrysanthemums
- Brassica campestris
- "Kujo" Welsh onions
- "Horikawa" Great burdock
- Hatakena
- Sugukina
- Kintoki carrots
- Chaste^{[?]}
- Kyo java water dropworts
- Brassica nipposinica
- Mibuna
- Winter cabbage
- Spring cabbage
- Cauliflower
- Broccoli
- Chinese cabbage
- "Arrowhead", which may be Sagittaria sagittifolia
- Taro-like tubers
- Saya Japanese radish
- Hanana

These are cultivated in Kyoto City.

Kyoto's main purpose for doing this is to popularize Kyo-yasai and to boost the competitiveness of agricultural products. Kyoto Prefecture appoints 21 products as “Brand products of Kyoto:”

- Brassica nipposinica
- Mibuna
- Kujo Welsh onion
- Japanese yam
- Fushimi pepper
- Manganji pepper
- Kyo yamashina eggplant
- Shikagatani pumpkin
- Kamo eggplant
- Kyo tango pear
- Murasakizukin
- Shogoin Japanese radish
- Arrowhead
- Hanana
- Taro-like tuber
- Kintoki carrot
- Horikawa burdock
- Tanba Japanese chestnut
- Azuki beans
- Black soybean
- Kyo bamboo

The Kyo-yasai market is working on circulating Kyo-yasai across Japan by setting up satellite shops.

== See also ==
- Japanese cuisine
