= Biff à la Lindström =

Swedish meat and vegetable dish

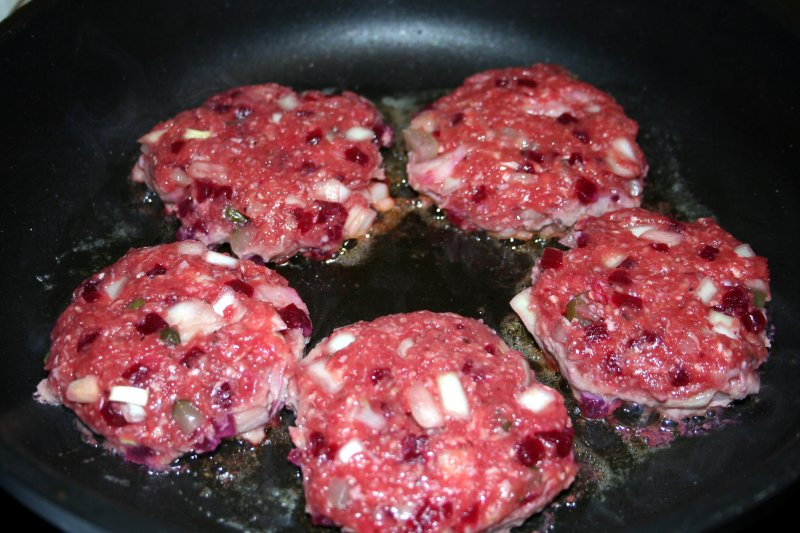
Biff á la Lindström cooking in a frying pan

Biff à la Lindström is a Swedish dish made from onion, potato, red beet, capers, and ground beef, which is made into patties and fried.

== Origin ==
Although the name Lindström sounds Swedish, the inclusion of beets and capers makes it likely that the dish originates in Russia. A common story is that the dish was invented by a Finnish soldier Henrik Lindström (1831–1910), who was born and raised in Saint Petersburg. He supposedly visited Hotel Witt in Kalmar on 4 May 1862, where he wanted to treat his friends to a meal he used to eat in Russia. He ordered the ingredients needed from the kitchen, and the guests were instructed by Lindström on how to make the patties. The patties were then brought back to the kitchen, where they were fried, and then served. The dish was promptly added to the hotel's menu. The dish remains on the hotel's menu.

Another story attributes the dish to Adolf Henrik Lindstrøm, the chef that accompanied both Fridtjof Nansen and Roald Amundsen on their missions to the poles and through the Northwest Passage. In his memoirs, Lindström wrote about the dish "Biff à la Lindstrøm" that it was made from bear meat and served in all the Grand hotels in Northern Europe. There is also a Swedish "Biff à la Lindstrøm" made from minced beef interspersed with beetroot. The polar chef Lindstrøm also made this dish, and said he had received the recipe from a Swedish housekeeper. However, he was not the originator of the dish many now associate with him.
