= Tsvikli =

Dish made from beetroot and horseradish

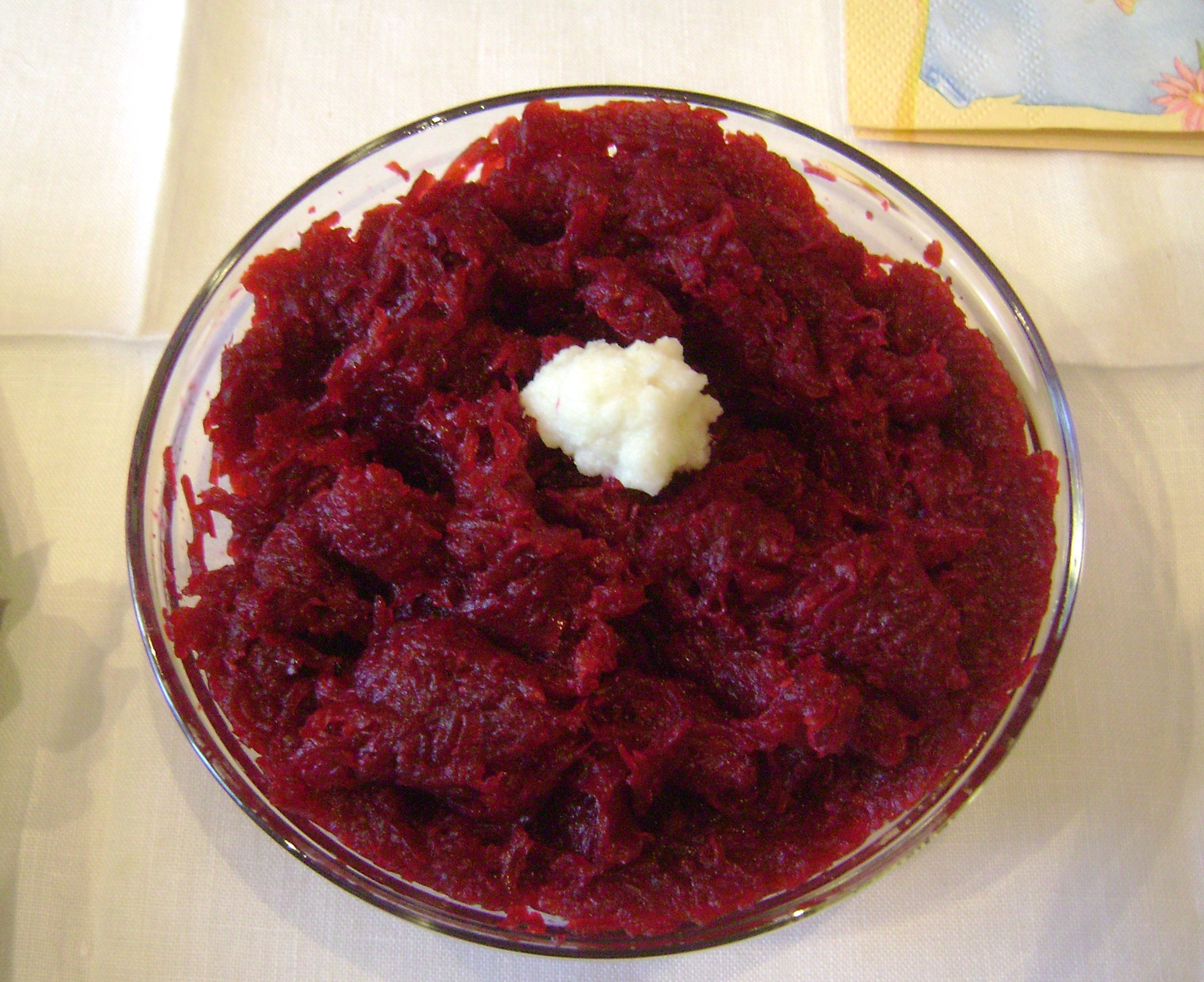
- Alternative names: цві́кля, цві́тлі, цвікли, бурачки з хроном
- Place of origin: Ukraine, Poland
- Serving temperature: cold
- Main ingredients: beetroot, horseradish
- Ingredients generally used: salt, sugar, vinegar, honey, cloves, cumin

Tsvikli (Ukrainian: цвіклі or burachki z hronom (beets with horseradish), Polish: ćwikła) is a Ukrainian and Polish dish made from grated, baked or boiled beets, horseradish, and spices. It is common in the western regions of Ukraine.

Tsvikli is an appetizer or hors d'oeuvres. It is served in small salad bowls with meat dishes. This dish are usually prepared before Christmas, Christmas Eve, and Easter.

== History ==
Polish poet and religious polemicist of the Renaissance, Mikołaj Rej, in his book "The Life of a Good Man" (Polish: "Żywot człowieka poczciwego") in 1567, wrote a recipe for beetroot, in which he advises "to roast the beets well, peel them, cut them into slices, put them in a barrel, sprinkle them with finely grated horseradish, add crushed fennel, sprinkle with vinegar and salt".

In the book "Home Kitchen or How to Cook and Bake" by L. Luchakivska from the 1910s, the following recipe for beets (borachki) is given: "You need to boil a few beets, and when they soften, peel and chop them. Make a stew with corned beef, add chopped onions, fry and salt. Add in the beets, add a few spoons of sour cream, vinegar to taste and a piece of sugar, stir and fry, and make sure that the beets do not burn, do not put them on a high heat but fry them on the edge of the kitchen. Serve with roast beef, hare, duck, etc."

A recipe from the 1978 edition of Selected Ukrainian Recipes For Winter Season calls the salad "Beets with sour cream." The recipe differs in that it recommends adding lemon juice at the end and also indicates the number of servings ("6 to 8").

== Preparation ==
It is worth taking beets with dark red roots, without white rings on the cross-section. Medium-sized beets are washed, spread on a baking dish, placed in the oven and baked to better preserve the color and taste.

Beets can also be boiled. Then it should be washed, cut off the leaves, but do not cut the root so that they do not lose their color. Washed beets are placed in boiling water, boiled until soft, peeled, rinsed with cold water.

== Variations ==
=== With horseradish ===
- Traditional version: Small red beets are boiled, peeled, cut, stacked, sprinkled with grated horseradish and crushed cumin. Then everything is poured with water with the addition of oil and put out to cool. Serve with potatoes or porridge.
- Modern version: Beets are baked or boiled, then peeled. Grated on a fine grater. Horseradish is washed, peeled and soaked in water for 1 hour. Grated on the finest grater. The ratio of grated horseradish to grated beets is 1:5, for a stronger taste - 1:4. Mix everything, salt, add sugar, vinegar and honey, crushed cloves, cumin and mix well.

=== Features ===
- Beets can be not only coarsely or finely grated, but also cut into strips.
- Beets with horseradish are stored in a tightly closed jar, otherwise the horseradish "weathers" and loses its strength.
- To make it easier to grate horseradish, you can first freeze it or chop it using a meat grinder or combine. Store the finished dish in the refrigerator.
- The finished dish is placed in a salad bowl, you can decorate it with a parsley leaf, cover it with slices of pickled pepper, and additionally sprinkle with grated horseradish.

== Without horseradish ==
- Washed beets are baked until cooked and then finely chopped. The flour is fried in fat, diluted with sour cream, poured over the prepared gravy over the beets and fried all together for a while. At the end of frying, add a little vinegar and sugar to taste.
- Variant by famous Ukrainian culinary author Daria Tsvek: Wash the beets and boil or bake. Then peel and grate on a fine grater. Fry the butter with flour until light in color, add the beets, mix, pour in 0.5 cups of water, salt, add a little sugar, pour in vinegar to taste, fry for a minute. Before serving, pour in sour cream and boil only once over low heat. Before serving, put in a deep salad bowl with a spoon for scooping.

=== With prunes and beans ===
Grated sweet beets, pickled red beets, prunes and beans are cooked separately until tender. Then mixed, topped with sour cream and served.
