= Cambodian eggplant =

Cultivar of eggplant traditionally used in Cambodian cuisine

Solanum melongena ត្រប់ចាន
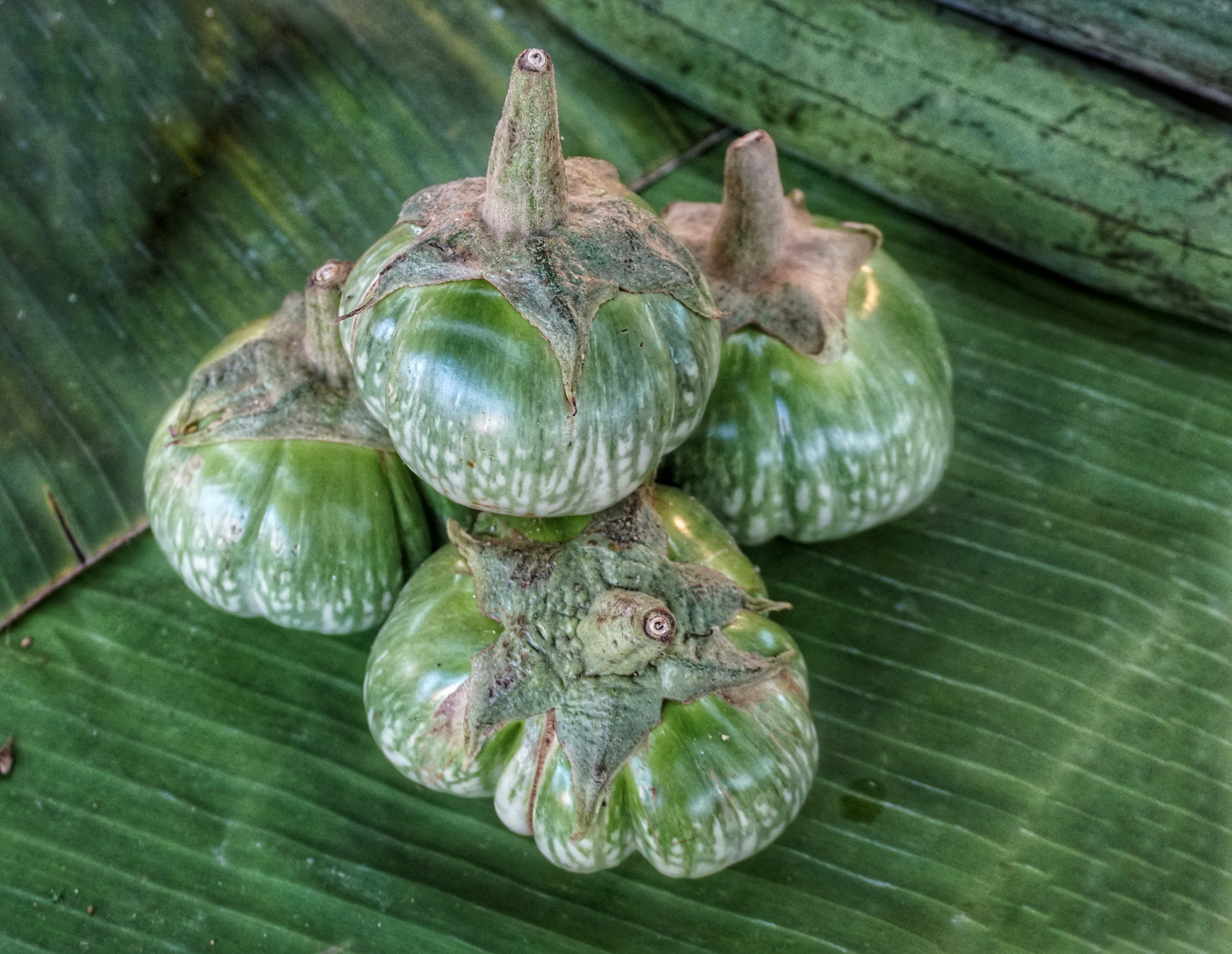
- Species: Solanum melongena
- Marketing names: Cambodian eggplant, Cambodian aubergine, Cambodian giant green, Cambodian green giant
- Origin: Cambodia

The Cambodian eggplant (Khmer: ត្រប់ចាន, lit. 'Plate-like eggplant'); also known as the Cambodian aubergine, Cambodian green giant, or Cambodian giant green; is an heirloom cultivar of the eggplant species Solanum melongena that is used in Cambodian cuisine.

== Appearance ==
The appearance of the eggplant is large, round, and stumpy. The colour is a lightish green with white ribbing and dark green stripes. The interior of the fruit has fully formed seeds. Due to the similar appearance and the fact that Cambodian eggplants are not as common, the variety is often confused for Thai eggplants and such often used as a substitute by Cambodian diaspora communities.

== Uses ==
=== Culinary ===
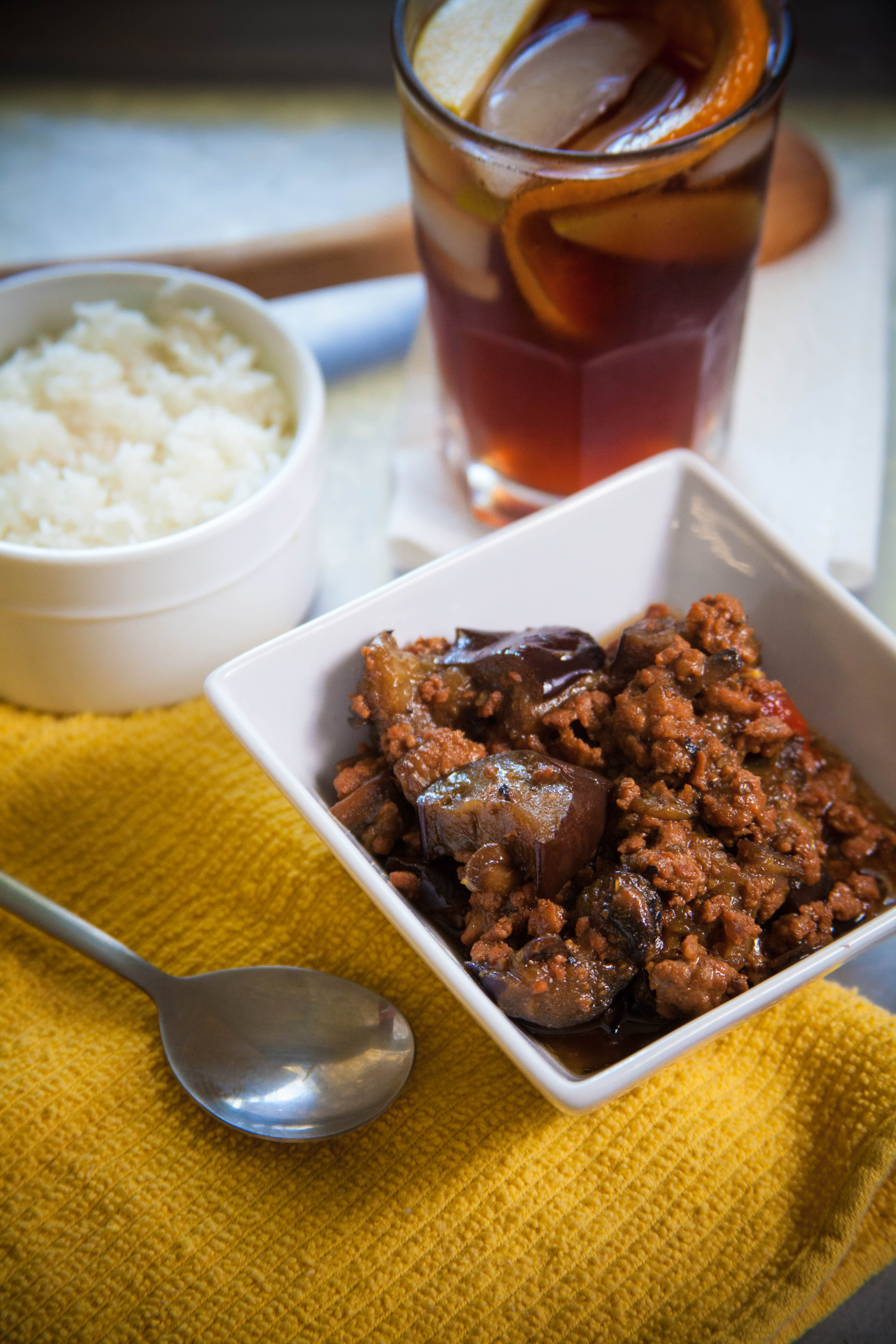
Cha traop dot, a stir-fry eggplant dish from Kampuchea Krom, served with jasmine rice and tea.

In Cambodian cuisine, they are often served raw with dipping sauce or cooked in stews.

The dish cha traop dot is a stir-fry of pork, eggplants, and soybeans that is made by the Khmer Krom indigenous people of the Mekong Delta.
