= Vivien Sansour =

Palestinian artist and conservationist

- فيفيان سانسور
- Born: 1978 (age 47–48); Jerusalem
- Education: East Carolina University
- Website: viviensansour.com

Vivien Sansour (Arabic: فيفيان سانسور; born 1978), is a Palestinian multimedia artist, writer, and founder of the Palestine Heirloom Seed Library. Her international work bridges between art, activism, botany, and conservation. Her work has been profiled by the BBC and included at exhibitions and events at the Victoria and Albert Museum (UK), the Chicago Architecture Biennale, and the Venice Biennale.

== Early life and education ==
Sansour spent her childhood between the US and Beit Jala in the West Bank, where her interest in biological diversity was born. In 2021–2022, Sansour was a Research Fellow in Conflict and Peace at Harvard University and was a distinguished artistic fellow at Bard College's Experimental Humanities department from 2022-2024.

== Key projects ==
The Palestine Heirloom Seed Library (2014–ongoing) preserves and promotes heritage and threatened seed varieties as well as traditional Palestinian farming practices. Through these methods cultural stories, and the identities associated with them are also preserved and shared.

The Traveling Kitchen, (2018) is an extension of the Palestine Heirloom Seed Library, made in collaboration with Ayed Arafah. A mobile kitchen in the back of a car, the artwork opens conversations about agro-ecology, food heritage and the relationships between fields and kitchens.

Zaree’a: On the work and legacy of Esiah Levy, London, 2019. Esiah Levy was a British seed saver and seed activist, founding a seed sharing project that distributed organic seeds around the world. Sansour worked with him during a residency at Delfina Foundation, London, in 2019, part of their Politics of Food season, creating a film about his work.

== Publications ==
- Vivien Sansour and Alaa Tartir (2014) Palestinian Farmers: A Last Stronghold of Resistance, al-shabaka the Palestinian policy network.
