= Heirloom plant =

Historic food crop cultivar

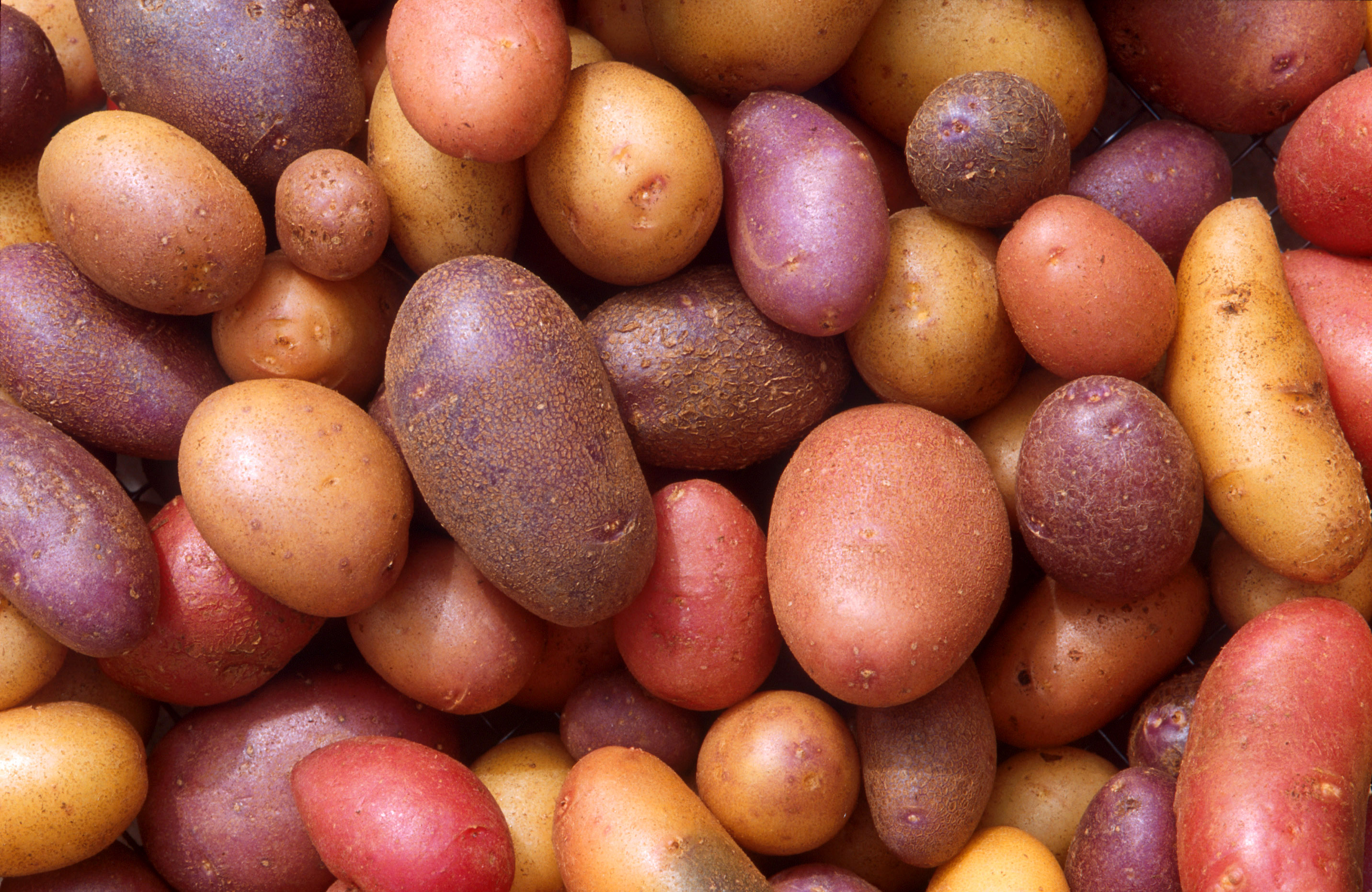
Only a few of the many varieties of potato are commercially grown; others are heirlooms.

An heirloom plant, heirloom variety, heritage fruit (Australia and New Zealand), or heirloom vegetable (especially in Ireland and the UK) is an old cultivar of a plant used for food that is grown and maintained by gardeners and farmers, particularly in isolated communities of the Western world. These were commonly grown during earlier periods in human history, but are not used in modern large-scale agriculture.

In some parts of the world, it is illegal to sell seeds of cultivars that are not listed as approved for sale. The Henry Doubleday Research Association, now known as Garden Organic, responded to this legislation by setting up the Heritage Seed Library to preserve seeds of as many of the older cultivars as possible. However, seed banks alone have not been able to provide sufficient insurance against catastrophic loss. In some jurisdictions, like Colombia, laws have been proposed that would make seed saving itself illegal.

Many heirloom vegetables have kept their traits through open pollination, while fruit varieties such as apples have been propagated over the centuries through grafting and cuttings. The trend of growing heirloom plants in gardens has been returning in popularity in North America and Europe.

== Origin ==
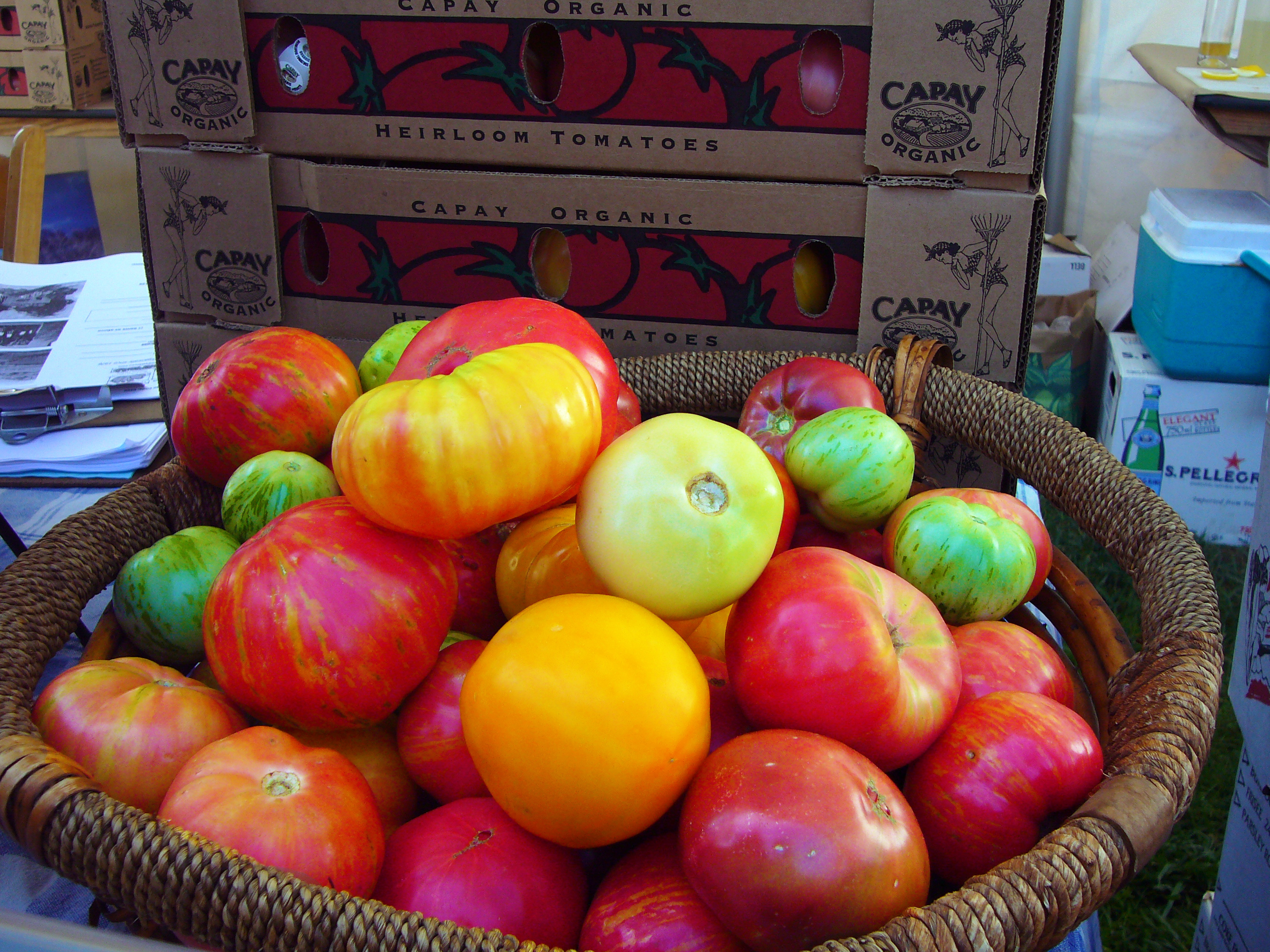
A selection of heirloom tomatoes

Before the industrialization of agriculture, a much wider variety of plant foods were grown for human consumption, largely due to farmers and gardeners saving seeds and cuttings for future planting. From the 16th century through the early 20th century, the diversity was huge. Old nursery catalogues were filled with plums, peaches, pears and apples of numerous varieties, and seed catalogs offered legions of vegetable varieties. Valuable and carefully selected seeds were sold and traded using these catalogs along with useful advice on cultivation. Since World War II, agriculture in the industrialized world has mostly consisted of food crops which are grown in large, monocultural plots. In order to maximize consistency, few varieties of each type of crop are grown. These varieties are often selected for their productivity and their ability to ripen at the same time while withstanding mechanical picking and cross-country shipping, as well as their tolerance to drought, frost, or pesticides. This form of agriculture has led to a 75% drop in crop genetic diversity.

While heirloom gardening has maintained a niche community, in recent years it has seen a resurgence in response to the industrial agriculture trend. In the Global South, heirloom plants are still widely grown, for example, in the home gardens of South and Southeast Asia. Before World War II, the majority of produce grown in the United States was heirlooms.

In the 21st century, numerous community groups all over the world are working to preserve historic varieties to make a wide variety of fruits, vegetables, herbs, and flowers available again to the home gardener, by renovating old orchards, sourcing historic fruit varieties, engaging in seed swaps, and encouraging community participation. Heirloom varieties are an increasingly popular way for gardeners and small farmers to connect with traditional forms of agriculture and the crops grown in these systems. Growers also cite lower costs associated with purchasing seeds, improved taste, and perceived improved nutritional quality as reasons for growing heirlooms. In many countries, hundreds or even thousands of heirloom varieties are commercially available for purchase or can be obtained through seed libraries and banks, seed swaps, or community events. Heirloom varieties may also be well suited for market gardening, farmer's market sales, and CSA programs.

A primary drawback to growing heirloom varieties is lower disease resistance compared to many commercially available hybrid varieties. Common disease problems, such as verticillium and fusarium wilt, may affect heirlooms more significantly than non-heirloom crops. Heirloom varieties may also be more delicate and perishable. In recent years, research has been conducted into improving the disease resistance of heirlooms, particularly tomatoes, by crossing them with resistant hybrid varieties.

== Requirements ==
The term heirloom to describe a seed variety was first used in the 1930s by horticulturist and vegetable grower J.R. Hepler to describe bean varieties handed down through families. However, the current definition and use of the word heirloom to describe plants is fiercely debated.

One school of thought places an age or date point on the cultivars. For instance, one school says the cultivar must be over 100 years old, others 50 years old, and others prefer the date of 1945, which marks the end of World War II and roughly the beginning of widespread hybrid use by growers and seed companies. Many gardeners consider 1951 to be the latest year a plant could have originated and still be called an heirloom, since that year marked the widespread introduction of the first hybrid varieties. It was in the 1970s that hybrid seeds began to proliferate in the commercial seed trade. Some heirloom varieties are much older; some are apparently pre-historic.

Another way of defining heirloom cultivars is to use the definition of the word heirloom in its truest sense. Under this interpretation, a true heirloom is a cultivar that has been nurtured, selected, and handed down from one family member to another for many generations.

Additionally, there is another category of cultivars that could be classified as "commercial heirlooms": cultivars that were introduced many generations ago and were of such merit that they have been saved, maintained and handed down—even if the seed company has gone out of business or otherwise dropped the line. Additionally, many old commercial releases have actually been family heirlooms that a seed company obtained and introduced.

Regardless of a person's specific interpretation, most authorities agree that heirlooms, by definition, must be open-pollinated. They may also require open-pollinated varieties to have been bred and stabilized using classic breeding practices. While there is currently one genetically modified tomato available to home growers, it is generally agreed that no genetically modified organisms can be considered heirloom cultivars. Another important point of discussion is that without the ongoing growing and storage of heirloom plants, the seed companies and the government will control all seed distribution. Most, if not all, hybrid plants, if they do not have sterile seeds and can be regrown, will not be the same as the original hybrid plant, thus ensuring the dependency on seed distributors for future crops.

Sociologist Jennifer A. Jordan describes the term "heirloom" as a culturally constructed concept that is only relevant due to the relatively recent loss of many crop varieties: "It is only with the rise of industrial agriculture that [the] practice of treating food as a literal heirloom has disappeared in many parts of the world—and that is precisely when the heirloom label emerges. ...[T]he concept of an heirloom becomes possible only in the context of the loss of actual heirloom varieties, of increased urbanization and industrialization as fewer people grow their own food, or at least know the people who grow their food."

== Collection sites ==
The heritage fruit trees that exist today are clonally descended from trees of antiquity. Heirloom roses are sometimes collected (nondestructively as small cuttings) from vintage homes and from cemeteries, where they were once planted at gravesites by mourners and left undisturbed in the decades since. Modern production methods and the rise in population have largely supplanted this practice.

== UK and EU law and national lists ==
In the UK and Europe, it is thought that many heritage vegetable varieties (perhaps over 2,000) have been lost since the 1970s, when EEC (now EU) laws were passed making it illegal to sell any vegetable cultivar not on the national list of any EEC country. This was set up to help in eliminating seed suppliers selling one seed as another, guarantee the seeds were true to type, and that they germinated consistently. Thus, there were stringent tests to assess varieties, with a view to ensuring they remain the same from one generation to the next. However, unique varieties were lost for posterity.

These tests (called DUS) assess "distinctness", "uniformity", and "stability". But since some heritage cultivars are not necessarily uniform from plant to plant, or indeed within a single plant—a single cultivar—this has been a sticking point. "Distinctness" has been a problem, moreover, because many cultivars have several names, perhaps coming from different areas or countries (e.g., carrot cultivar Long Surrey Red is also known as "Red Intermediate", "St. Valery", and "Chertsey"). However, it has been ascertained that some of these varieties that look similar are in fact different cultivars. On the other hand, two that were known to be different cultivars were almost identical to each other, thus one would be dropped from the national list in order to clean it up.

Another problem has been the fact that it is somewhat expensive to register and then maintain a cultivar on a national list. Therefore, if no seed breeder or supplier thinks it will sell well, no one will maintain it on a list, and so the seed will not be re-bred by commercial seed breeders.

In recent years, progress has been made in the UK to set up allowances and less stringent tests for heritage varieties on a B national list, but this is still under consideration.

When heirloom plants are not being sold, however, laws are often more lenient. Because most heirloom plants are at least 50 years old and grown and swapped in a family or community they fall under the public domain. Another worldwide alternative is to submit heirloom seeds to a seedbank. These public repositories in turn maintain and disperse these genetics to anyone who will use them appropriately. Typically, approved uses are breeding, study, and sometimes, further distribution.

== US state law ==
There are a variety of intellectual property protections and laws that are applied to heirloom seeds, which can often differ greatly between states. Plant patents are based on the Plant Patent Act of 1930, which protects plants grown from cuttings and division, while under intellectual property rights, the Plant Variety Protection Act of 1970 (PVPA) shields non-hybrid, seed-propagated plants. However, seed breeders can only shelter their variety for 20 years under PVPA. There are also a couple of exceptions under the PVPA which allow growers to cultivate, save seeds, and sell the resultant crops, and give breeders allowances to use PVPA protected varieties as starter material as long as it constitutes less than half of the breeding material. There are also seed licenses which may place restrictions on the use of seeds or trademarks that guard against the use of certain plant variety names.

In 2014, the Pennsylvania Department of Agriculture caused a seed-lending library to shut down and promised to curtail any similar efforts in the state. The lending library, hosted by a town library, allowed gardeners to "check out" a package of open-pollinated seed, and "return" seeds kept from the crop grown from those seeds. The Department of Agriculture said that this activity raises the possibility of "agro-terrorism", and that a Seed Act of 2004 requires the library staff to test each seed packet for germination rate and whether the seed was true to type. In 2016 the department reversed this decision, and clarified that seed libraries and non-commercial seed exchanges are not subject to the requirements of the Seed Act.

== Food justice ==
In Palestine, some heirloom growers and seed savers see themselves as contributing a form of resistance against the privatization of agriculture, while also telling stories of their ancestors, defying violence, and encouraging rebellion. The Palestinian Heirloom Seed Library (PHSL), founded by writer and activist Vivien Sansour, breeds and maintains a selection of traditional crops from the region, seeking to "preserve and promote heritage and threatened seed varieties, traditional Palestinian farming practices, and the cultural stories and identities associated with them." Some scholars have additionally framed the increasing control of Israeli agribusiness corporations over Palestinian seed supplies as an attempt to suppress food sovereignty and as a form of subtle ecocide.

In January 2012, a conflict over seed access erupted in Latvia when two undercover investigators from the Latvian State Plant Protection Agency charged an independent farm with the illegal sale of unregistered heirloom tomato seeds. The agency suggested that the farm choose a small number of varieties to officially register and to abandon the other approximately 800 varieties grown on the farm. This infuriated customers as well as members of the general public, many of whom spoke out against what was seen as an overly strict interpretation of the law. The scandal further escalated with a series of hearings held by agency officials, during which residents called for a reexamination of seed registration laws and demanded greater citizen participation in legal and political matters relating to agriculture.

In Peru and Ecuador, genes from heirloom tomato varieties and wild tomato relatives have been the subject of patent claims by the University of Florida. These genes have been investigated for their usefulness in increasing drought and salt tolerance and disease resistance, as well as improving flavor, in commercial tomatoes. The American genomics development company Evolutionary Genomics identified genes found in Galapagos tomatoes that may increase sweetness by up to 25% and as of 2023 has filed an international patent application on the usage of these genes.

Native heirloom and landrace crop varieties and their stewards are sometimes subject to theft and biopiracy. Biopiracy may negatively impact communities that grow these heirloom varieties through loss of profits and livelihoods, as well as litigation. One infamous example is the case of Enola bean patent, in which a Texas corporation collected heirloom Mexican varieties of the scarlet runner bean and patented them, and then sued the farmers who had supplied the seeds in the first place to prevent them from exporting their crops to the US. The 'Enola' bean was granted 20-year patent protection in 1999, but subsequently underwent numerous legal challenges on the grounds that the bean was not a novel variety. In 2004, DNA fingerprinting techniques were used to demonstrate that 'Enola' was functionally identical to a yellow bean grown in Mexico known as Azufrado Peruano 87. The case has been widely cited as a prime example of biopiracy and misapplication of patent rights.

Native communities in the United States and Mexico have drawn particular attention to the importance of traditional and culturally appropriate seed supplies. The Traditional Native American Farmers Association (TNAFA) is an Indigenous organization aiming to "revitalize traditional agriculture for spiritual and human need" and advocating for traditional methods of growing, preparing, and consuming plants. In concert with other organizations, TNAFA has also drafted a formal Declaration of Seed Sovereignty and worked with legislators to protect Indigenous heritage seeds.

Indigenous peoples are also at the forefront of the seed rematriation movement to bring lost seed varieties back to their traditional stewards. Rematriation efforts are frequently directed at institutions such as universities, museums, and seed banks, which may hold Indigenous seeds in their collection that are inaccessible to the communities from which they originate. In 2018, the Seed Savers Exchange, the largest publicly accessible seed bank in the United States, rematriated several heirloom seed varieties back to Indigenous communities.

== Activism ==
Activism surrounding food justice, farmers' rights, and seed sovereignty frequently overlap with the promotion and usage of heirloom crop varieties. International peasant farmers' organization La Via Campesina is credited with the first usage of the term "food sovereignty" and campaigns for agrarian reform, seed freedom, and farmers' rights. It currently represents more than 150 social movement organizations in 56 countries. Numerous other organizations and collectives worldwide participate in food sovereignty activism, including the US Food Sovereignty Alliance, Food Secure Canada, and the Latin American Seeds Collective in North and South America; the African Center for Biodiversity (ACB), the Coalition for the Protection of African Genetic Heritage (COPAGEN), and the West African Peasant Seed Committee (COASP) in Africa; and the Alliance for Sustainable and Holistic Agriculture (ASHA), Navdanya, and the Southeast Asia Regional Initiatives for Community Empowerment (SEARICE) in Asia. In a 2022 BBC interview, Indian environmental activist and scholar Vandana Shiva stated that "Seed is the source of life. Seed is the source of food. To protect food freedom, we must protect seed freedom."

Other writers have pushed back against the promotion and proliferation of heirloom crop varieties that are over-selected or heavily inbred, connecting their usage to the impacts of colonialism. Quoting American author and educator Martín Prechtel in his article in The Guardian, Chris Smith writes that "'To keep seeds alive, clear, strong and open-pollinated, purity as the idea of a single pure race must be understood as the ironic insistence of imperial minds.'" Writer and journalist Brendan Borrell calls heirloom tomatoes "the tomato equivalent of the pug—that 'purebred' dog with the convoluted nose that snorts and hacks when it tries to catch a breath" and claims that selection for unique size, shape, color, and flavor has hampered disease resistance and hardiness in heirlooms.

== Future ==
More attention is being put on heirloom plants as a way to restore genetic diversity and feed a growing population while safeguarding the food supply of diverse regions. Specific heirloom plants are often selected, saved, and planted again because of their superior performance in a particular locality. Over many crop cycles these plants develop unique adaptive qualities to their environment, which empowers local communities and can be vital to maintaining the genetic resources of the world.

Some debate has occurred regarding the perceived improved nutritional qualities of heirloom varieties compared to modern cultivars. Anecdotal reports claim that heirloom vegetables are more nutritious or contain more vitamins and minerals than more recently developed vegetables. Current research does not support the claim that heirloom varieties generally contain a greater concentration of nutrients; however, nutrient concentration and composition does appear to vary between different cultivars. Nevertheless, heirloom varieties may still contain the genetic basis for useful traits that can be employed to improve modern crops, including for human nutritional qualities.

Heirloom varieties are also critical to promoting global crop diversity, which has generally declined since the middle of the 20th century. Heirloom crops may contain genetic material that is distinct from varieties typically grown in monocrop systems, many of which are hybrid varieties. Monocrop systems tend to be vulnerable to disease and pest outbreaks, which can decimate whole industries due to the genetic similarity between plants. Some organizations have employed seed banks and vaults to preserve and protect crop genetics against catastrophic loss. One of the most notable of these seed banks is the Svalbard Global Seed Vault located in Svalbard, Norway, which safeguards approximately 1.2 million seed samples with capacity for up to 4.5 million. Some writers and farmers have criticized the apparent reliance on seed vaults, however, and argue that heirloom and rare varieties are better protected against extinction when actively planted and grown than stored away with no immediate influence on crop genetic diversity.

== Examples ==
- Bhutanese red rice
- Black rice
- Heirloom tomato
- Cambodian eggplant

== See also ==
- Ark of Taste
- Biodiversity
- Community gardening
- History of gardening
- Association Kokopelli
- Landrace
- List of organic gardening and farming topics
- Local food
- Orthodox seed
- Rare breed
- Recalcitrant seed
- Seed saving
- Seedbank
- Slow Food
- Kyoyasai, a specific class of Japanese heirloom vegetables originating around Kyoto, Japan.
