= 1220 AM =

AM radio frequency

The following radio stations broadcast on AM frequency 1220 kHz: 1220 AM is a Mexican clear-channel frequency. XEB Mexico City is the dominant Class A station on 1220 kHz.

== In Argentina ==
- Eco Medios in Buenos Aires

== In Canada ==
- CJRB in Boissevain, Manitoba - 10 kW, transmitter located at 49.2572°N 100.057°W
- CFAJ in St. Catharines, Ontario - 10 kW, transmitter located at 43.0564°N 79.2222°W

== In Mexico ==
Stations in bold are clear-channel stations.

- **XEB-AM** in San Lorenzo Tezonco, Mexico City - 100 kW, transmitter located at 19.308611°N 99.058889°W
- XESAL-AM in Saltillo, Coahuila

== In the United States ==
Call sign	City of license	Facility ID	Class	Daytime power (kW)	Nighttime power (kW)	Unlimited power (kW)	Transmitter coordinates
KCAX	Branson, Missouri	68415	D	1	0.044		36.718889°N 93.238889°W
KDDR	Oakes, North Dakota	60499	B	1	0.327		46.123056°N 98.089167°W
KDOW	Palo Alto, California	65485	D	5	0.145		37.484444°N 122.134444°W
KGIR	Cape Girardeau, Missouri	64622	D	0.25	0.137		37.3°N 89.49°W
KHTS	Canyon Country, California	58521	B	1	0.5		34.465278°N 118.401944°W
KJAN	Atlantic, Iowa	73031	D	0.178	0.062		41.417222°N 95.004167°W
KLDC	Denver, Colorado	12364	D	1	0.012		39.683333°N 105.006667°W
KLPW	Union, Missouri	70303	D	1	0.126		38.4825°N 91.044167°W
KMVL	Madisonville, Texas	37063	D	0.5	0.011		30.965556°N 95.897778°W
KOFO	Ottawa, Kansas	6648	D	0.25	0.04		38.584444°N 95.265833°W
KQMG	Independence, Iowa	42077	D	0.25	0.134		42.475556°N 91.873889°W
KSLM	Salem, Oregon	10963	D	1	0.171		44.951389°N 122.969444°W
KTLV	Midwest City, Oklahoma	21555	D	0.25	0.005		35.397222°N 97.451111°W
KZEE	Weatherford, Texas	56300	D	1.6	0.2		32.788056°N 97.7925°W
WATX	Hamden, Connecticut	42658	B	1	0.305		41.377222°N 72.928889°W
WAYE	Birmingham, Alabama	5354	D	1	0.075		33.4775°N 86.849167°W
WBCH	Hastings, Michigan	3990	D	0.25	0.048		42.626111°N 85.278056°W
WCPH	Etowah, Tennessee	63494	D	1	0.109		35.320833°N 84.509444°W
WDYT	Kings Mountain, North Carolina	6817	D	25	0.106		35.286667°N 81.174444°W
WENC	Whiteville, North Carolina	26000	D	5	0.152		34.308333°N 78.716667°W
WERM	Fairhope, Alabama	32848	D	1	0.03		30.510833°N 87.903611°W
WERT	Van Wert, Ohio	56181	D	0.25	0.029		40.871944°N 84.554167°W
WFAX	Falls Church, Virginia	48732	D	5	0.048		38.879722°N 77.171667°W
WFKN	Franklin, Kentucky	24245	D	0.25	0.09		36.738889°N 86.578333°W
WGNY	Newburgh, New York	63942	D	10	0.18		41.531389°N 74.113333°W
WHKW	Cleveland, Ohio	14772	B			50	41.307222°N 81.689167°W
WJUN	Mexico, Pennsylvania	62368	D	1	0.046		40.535°N 77.340556°W
WKRS	Waukegan, Illinois	10450	D	1	0.09		42.349722°N 87.881389°W
WKTZ	Jacksonville, Florida	31937	D	1	0.036		30.325°N 81.570833°W
WLPO	LaSalle, Illinois	36645	B	1	0.5		41.303889°N 89.095556°W
WLSD	Big Stone Gap, Virginia	69676	D	1	0.045		36.840556°N 82.737222°W
WOEG	Hazlehurst, Mississippi	13858	D	0.164	0.033		31.8925°N 90.402222°W
WOTS	Kissimmee, Florida	72930	D	1	0.11		28.324167°N 81.395556°W
WREV	Reidsville, North Carolina	41442	D	1			36.388611°N 79.6475°W
WSLM	Salem, Indiana	17153	D	5	0.082		38.615278°N 86.086111°W
WSRQ	Sarasota, Florida	27663	D	0.77	0.015		27.323889°N 82.496111°W
WSTL	Providence, Rhode Island	9183	D	1	0.166		41.820833°N 71.385278°W
WWSF	Sanford, Maine	74068	D	1	0.234		43.431389°N 70.762222°W
WZBK	Keene, New Hampshire	57227	D	1	0.146		42.930556°N 72.3°W
WZOT	Rockmart, Georgia	7041	D	0.5	0.103		34.003889°N 85.056111°W
