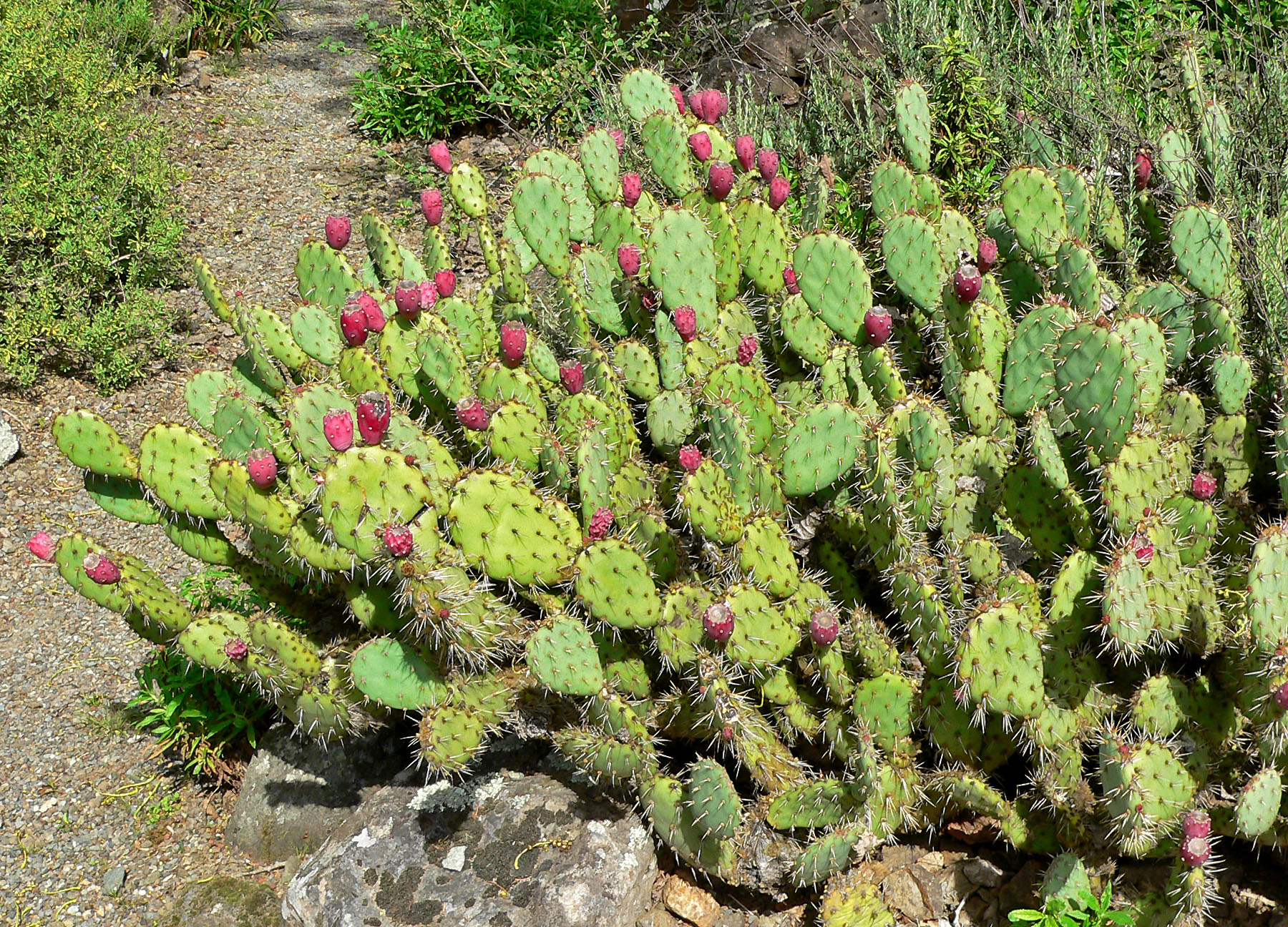
- O. littoralis var. vaseyi

Scientific classification
- Kingdom: Plantae
- Clade: Tracheophytes
- Clade: Angiosperms
- Clade: Eudicots
- Order: Caryophyllales
- Family: Cactaceae
- Subfamily: Opuntioideae
- Tribe: Opuntieae
- Genus: Opuntia; Mill.

Species
- Many, see List of Opuntia species

Synonyms
- Chaffeyopuntia Frič & Schelle; Ficindica St.-Lag.; Nopalea Salm-Dyck; Phyllarthus Neck. ex M.Gómez (nom. inval.); Salmiopuntia Frič (nom. inval.); Tunas Lunell; and see text

= Opuntia =

Genus of cactus

Opuntia, commonly called the prickly pear cactus, is a genus of flowering plants in the cactus family Cactaceae, many known for their flavorful fruit and showy flowers. Between 8,000 and 9,000 years ago, the Opuntia prickly pear cactus was domesticated in central Mexico. Cacti are native to the Americas, and are well adapted to arid climates; however, they are still vulnerable to alterations in precipitation and temperature driven by climate change. The plant has been introduced to Australia, southern Europe, the Middle East, and parts of Africa.

Prickly pear alone is also used to refer to the fruit, but may also be used for the plant itself; in addition, other names given to the plant and its specific parts include tuna (fruit), sabra, sabbar, nopal (pads, plural nopales, from the Nahuatl word nōpalli), nostle (fruit) from the Nahuatl word nōchtli, and paddle cactus. The genus is named for the Ancient Greek city of Opus. The fruit and stems are edible. The most common culinary species is the "Barbary fig" (Opuntia ficus-indica).

In places where they have been introduced outside their native range, some species in the genus Opuntia behave as aggressive invasive species.

== Description ==
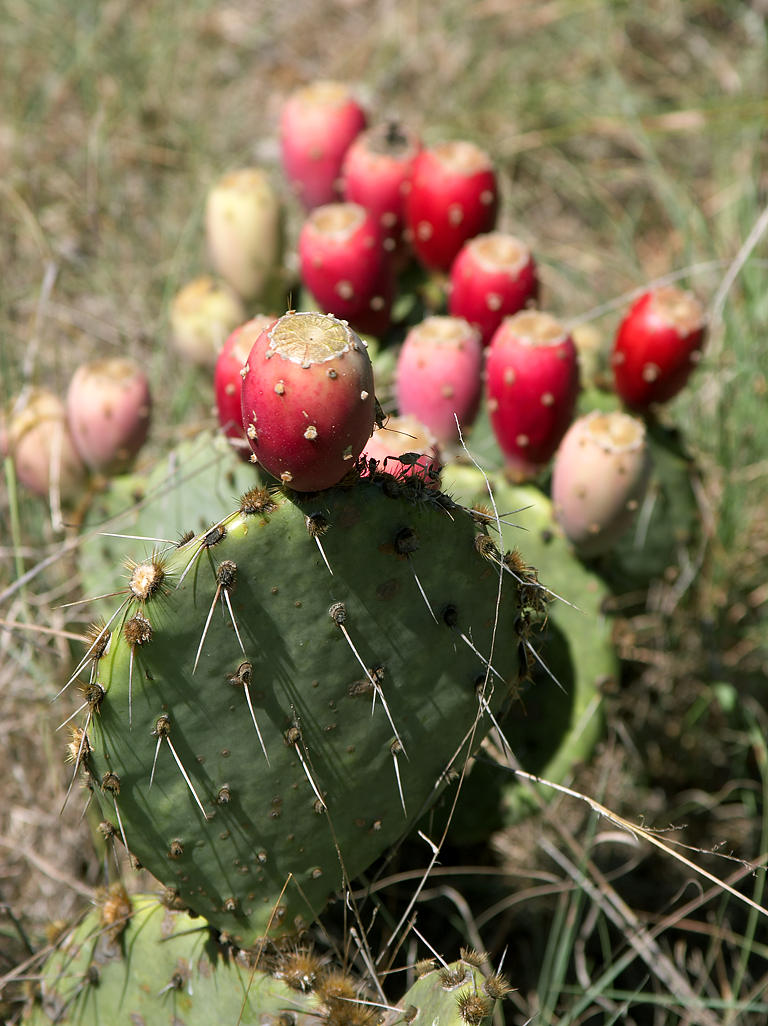
Typical morphology

Opuntia ficus-indica is a large, trunk-forming, segmented cactus that may grow to 5–7 m (16–23 ft) with a crown of over 3 m (10 ft) in diameter and a trunk diameter of 1 m (3 ft). Cladodes (large pads) are green to blue-green, bearing few spines up to 2.5 cm (1 in) or may be spineless. Prickly pears typically grow with flat, rounded cladodes (also called platyclades) containing large, smooth, fixed spines and small, hairlike prickles called glochids that readily adhere to skin or hair, then detach from the plant. The flowers are typically large, axillary, solitary, bisexual, and epigynous, with a perianth consisting of distinct, spirally arranged tepals and a hypanthium. The stamens are numerous and in spiral or whorled clusters, and the gynoecium has numerous inferior ovaries per carpel. Placentation is parietal, and the fruit is a berry with arillate seeds. Prickly pear species can vary greatly in habit; most are shrubs, but some, such as O. galapageia of the Galápagos, are trees.

=== Growth ===
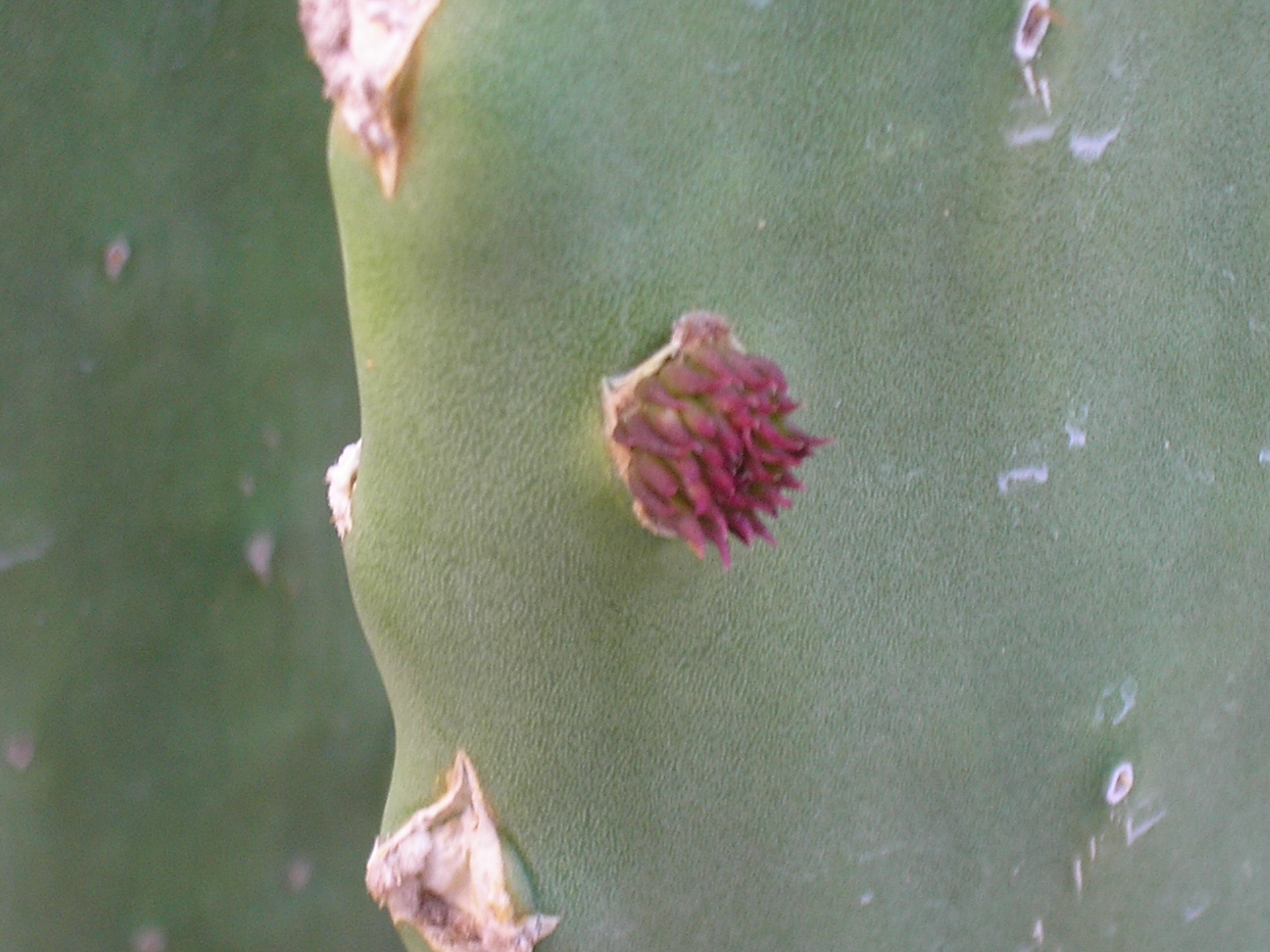
Bud appears

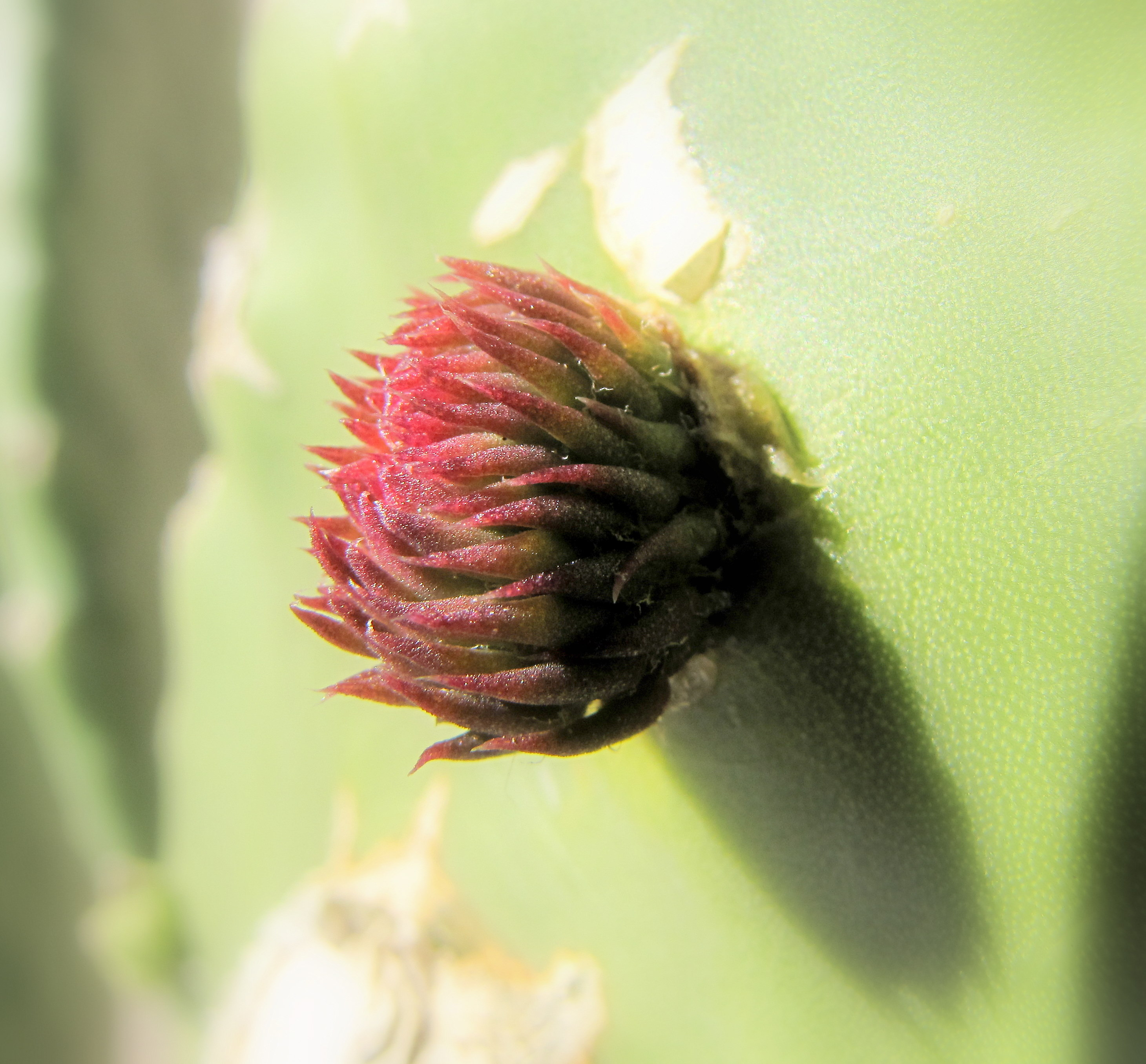
Bud grows

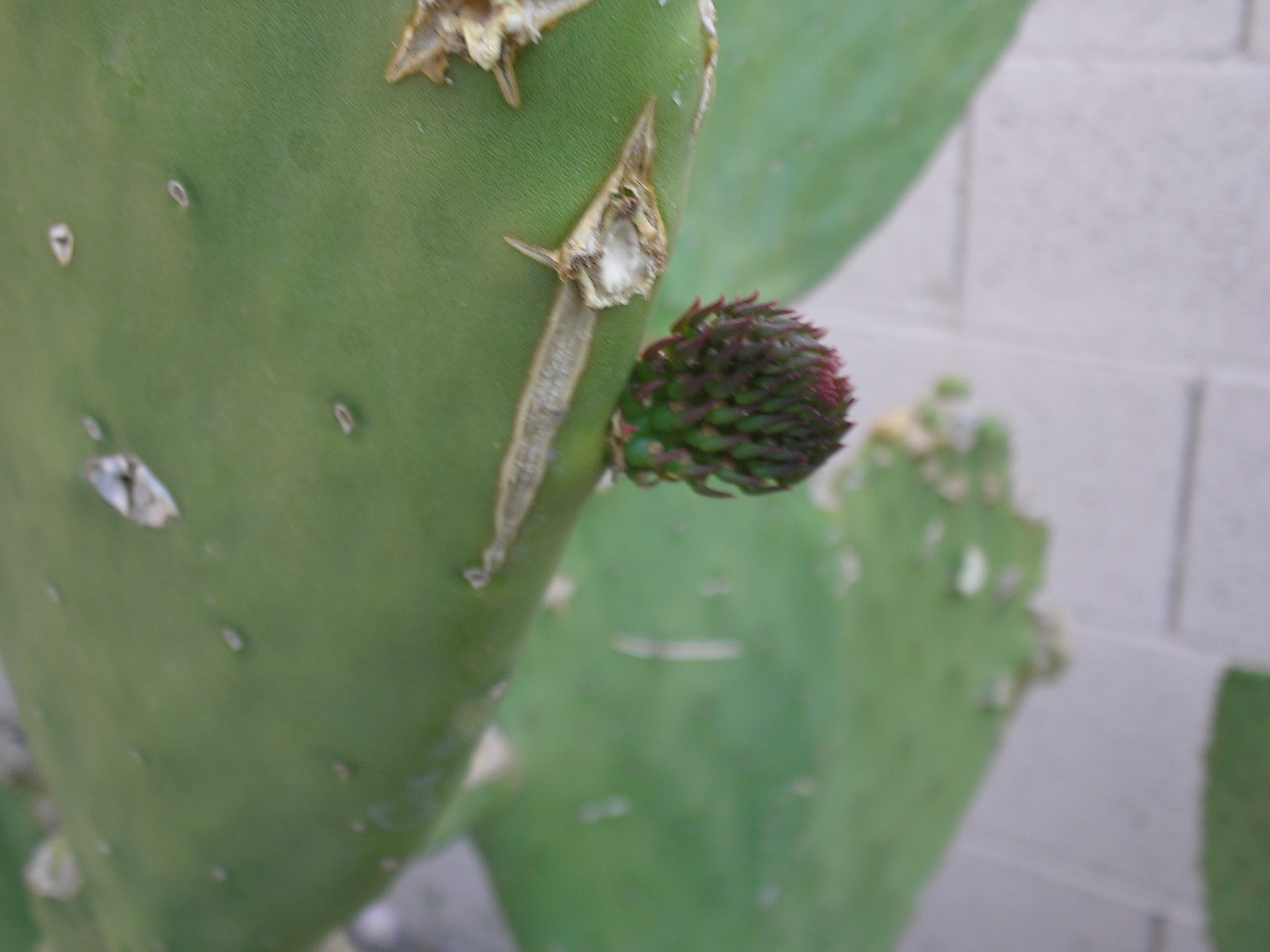
Bud begins pad transformation

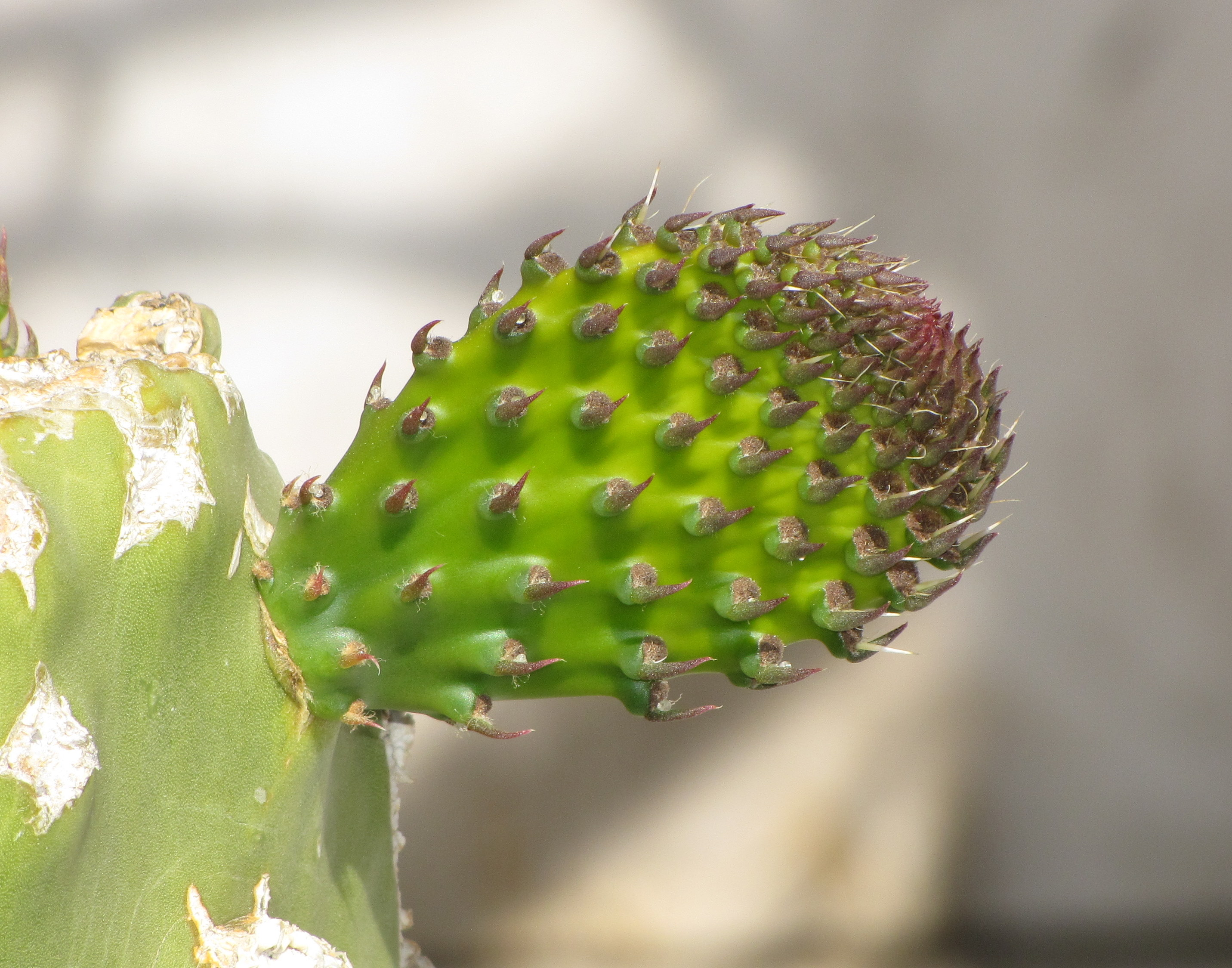
Bud completes pad transformation

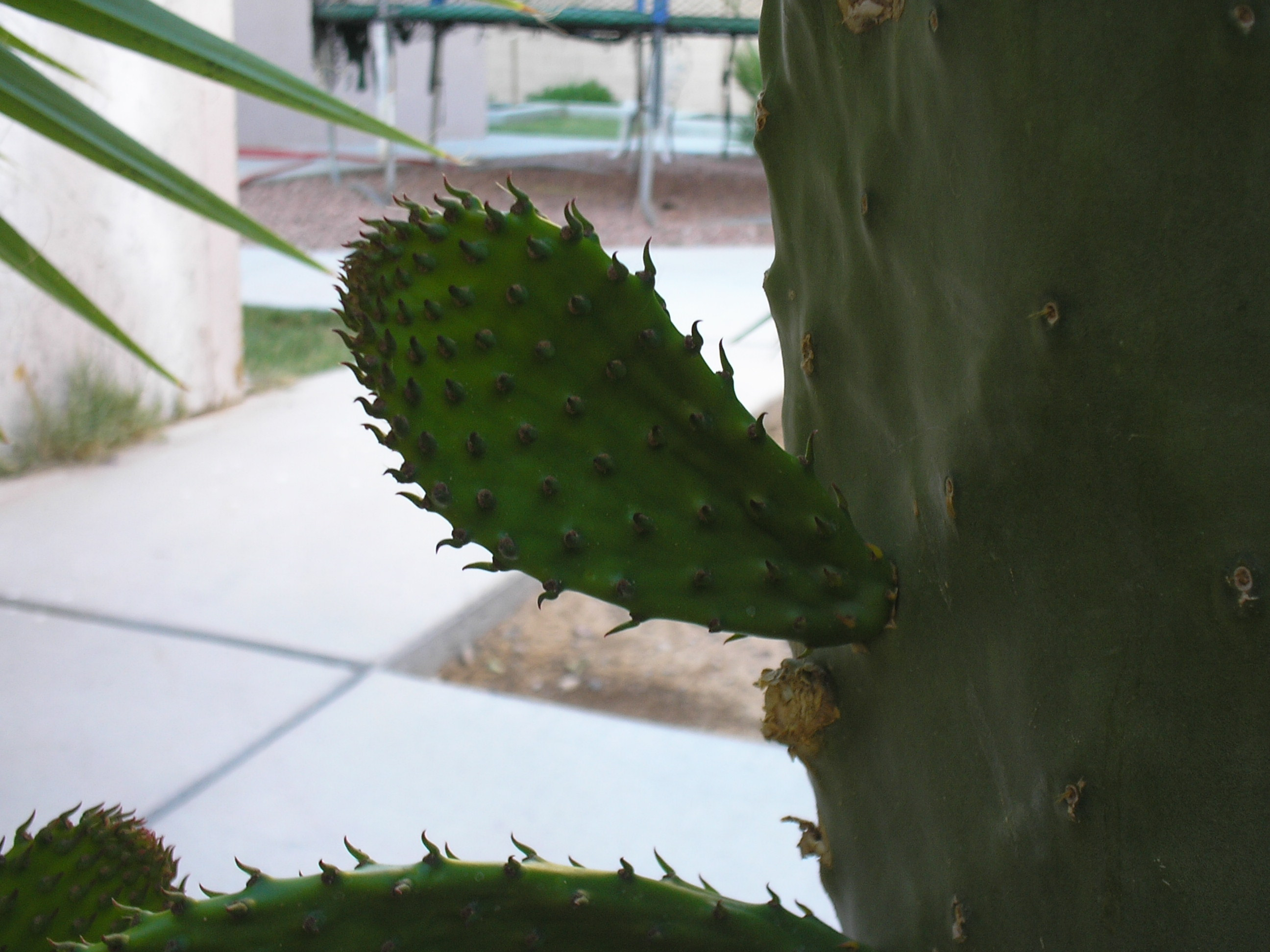
Pad continues growth

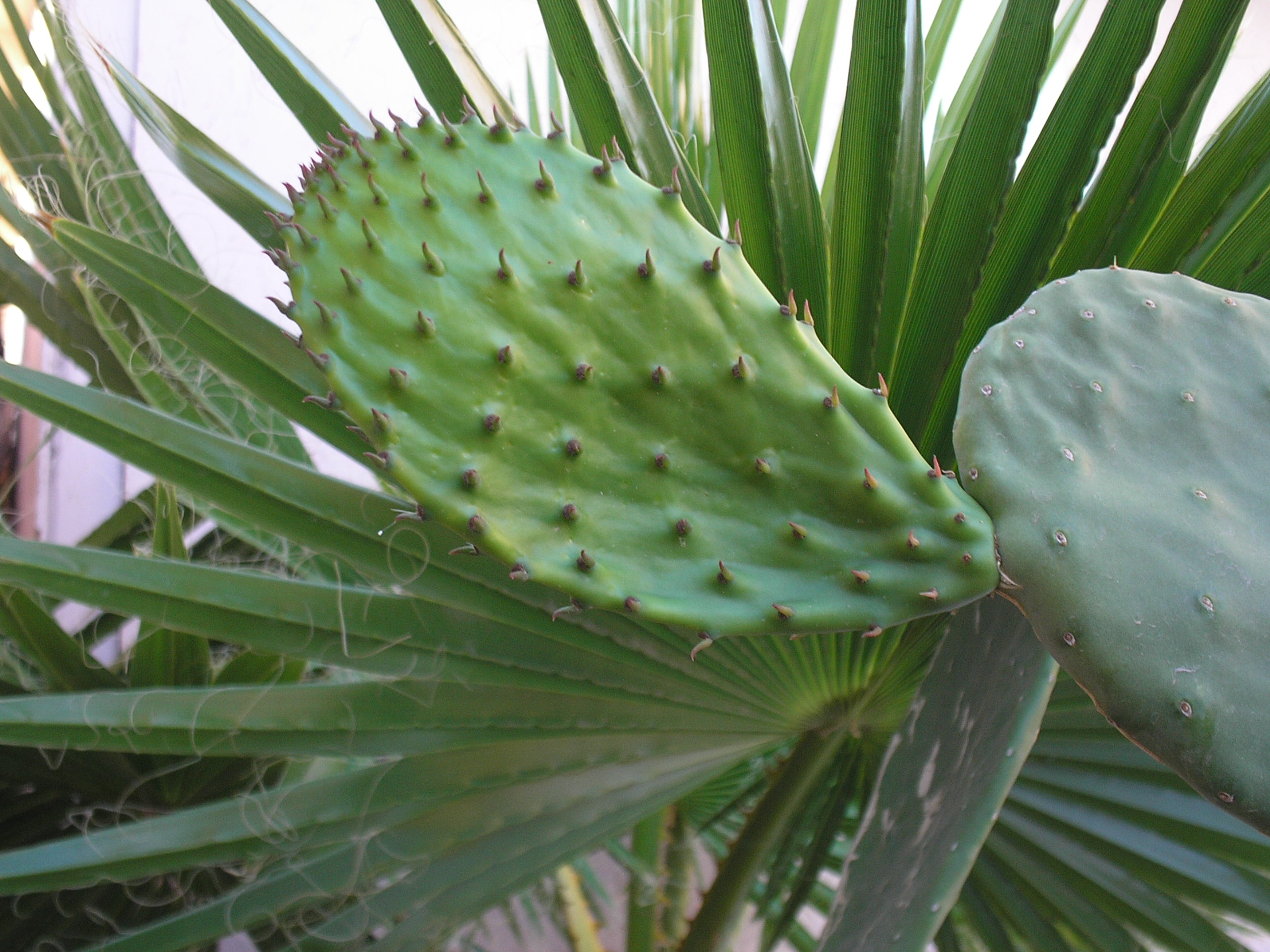
Edible pad (tender)

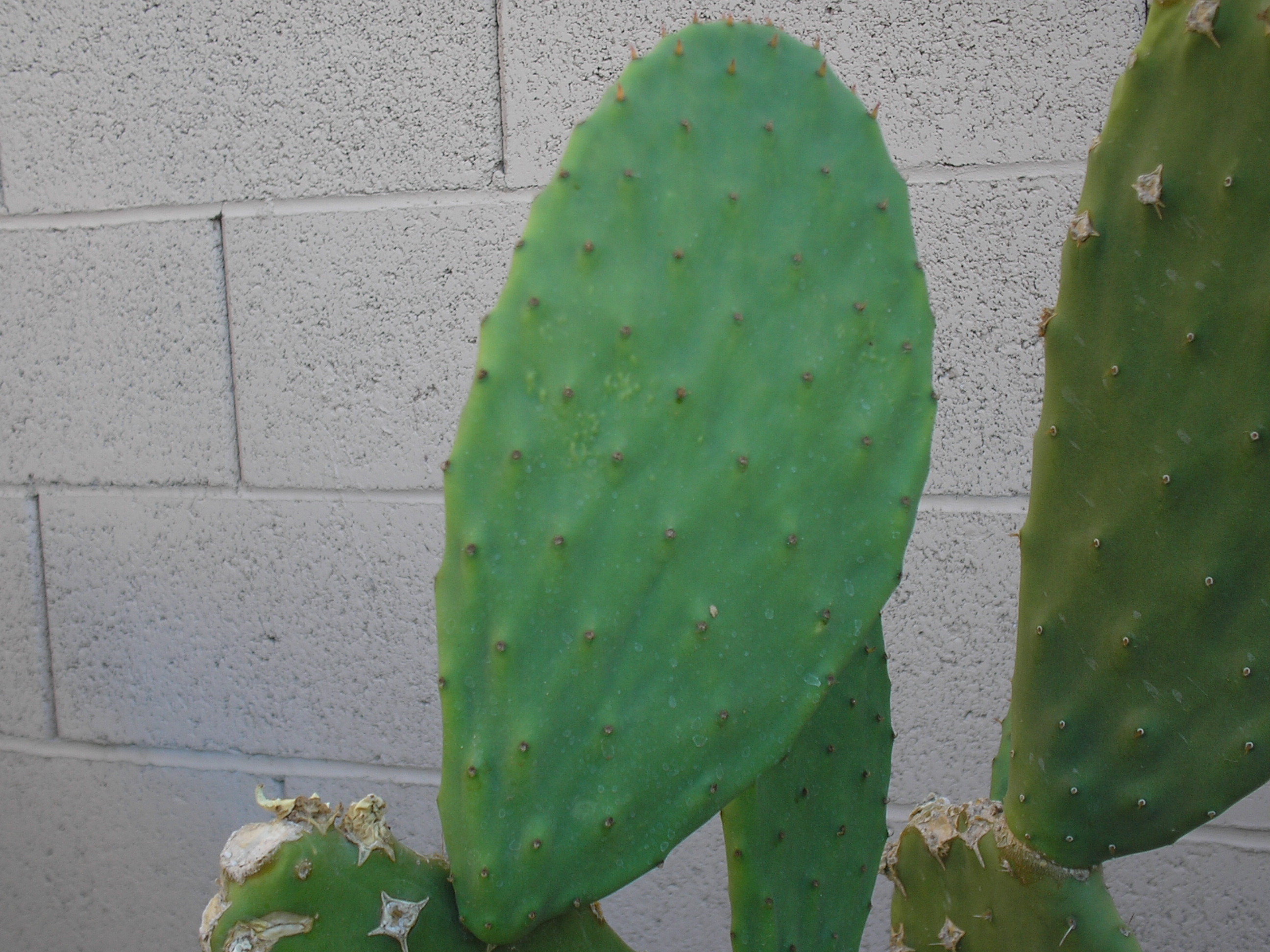
Mature pad

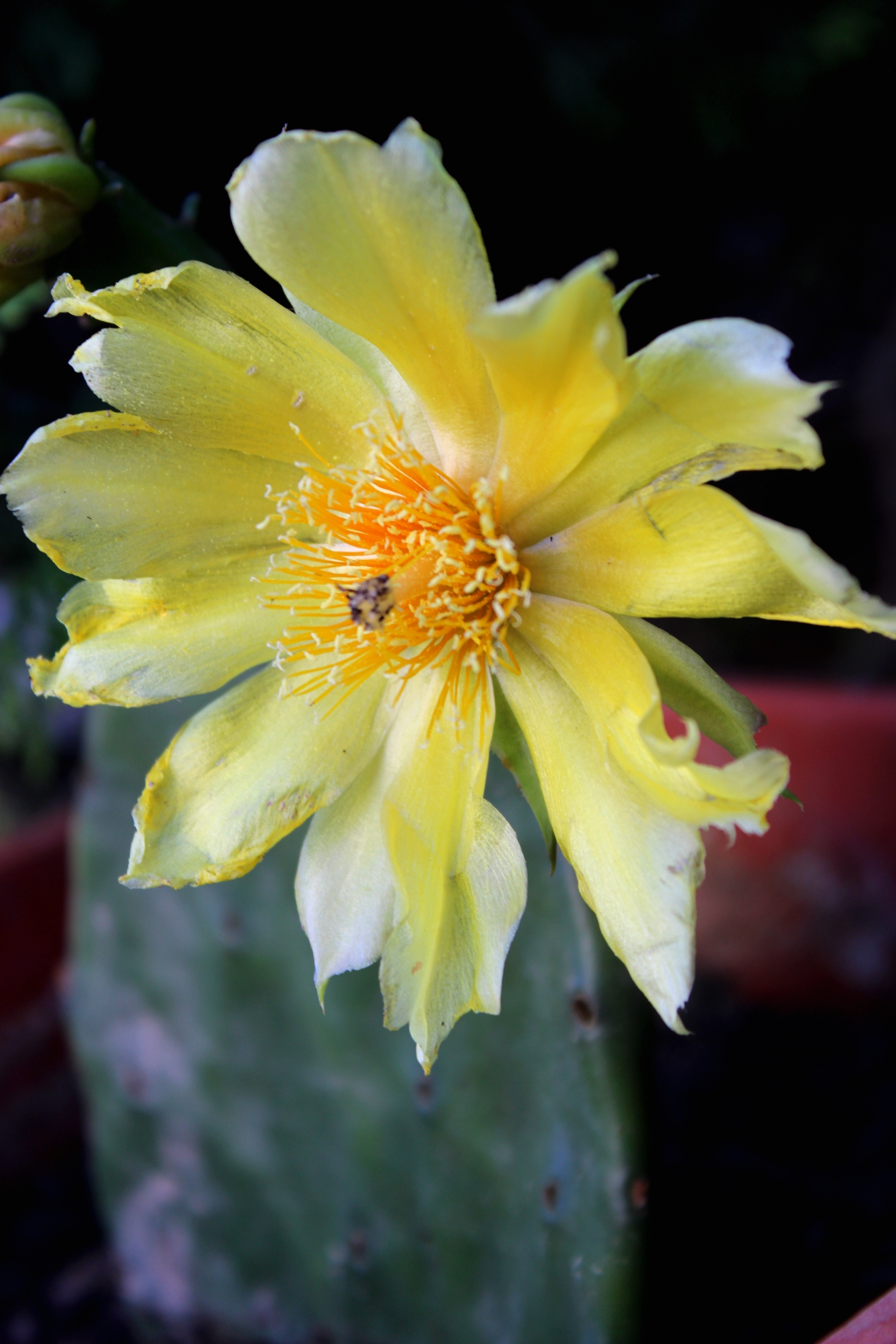
Mature pad with flower

== Taxonomy ==
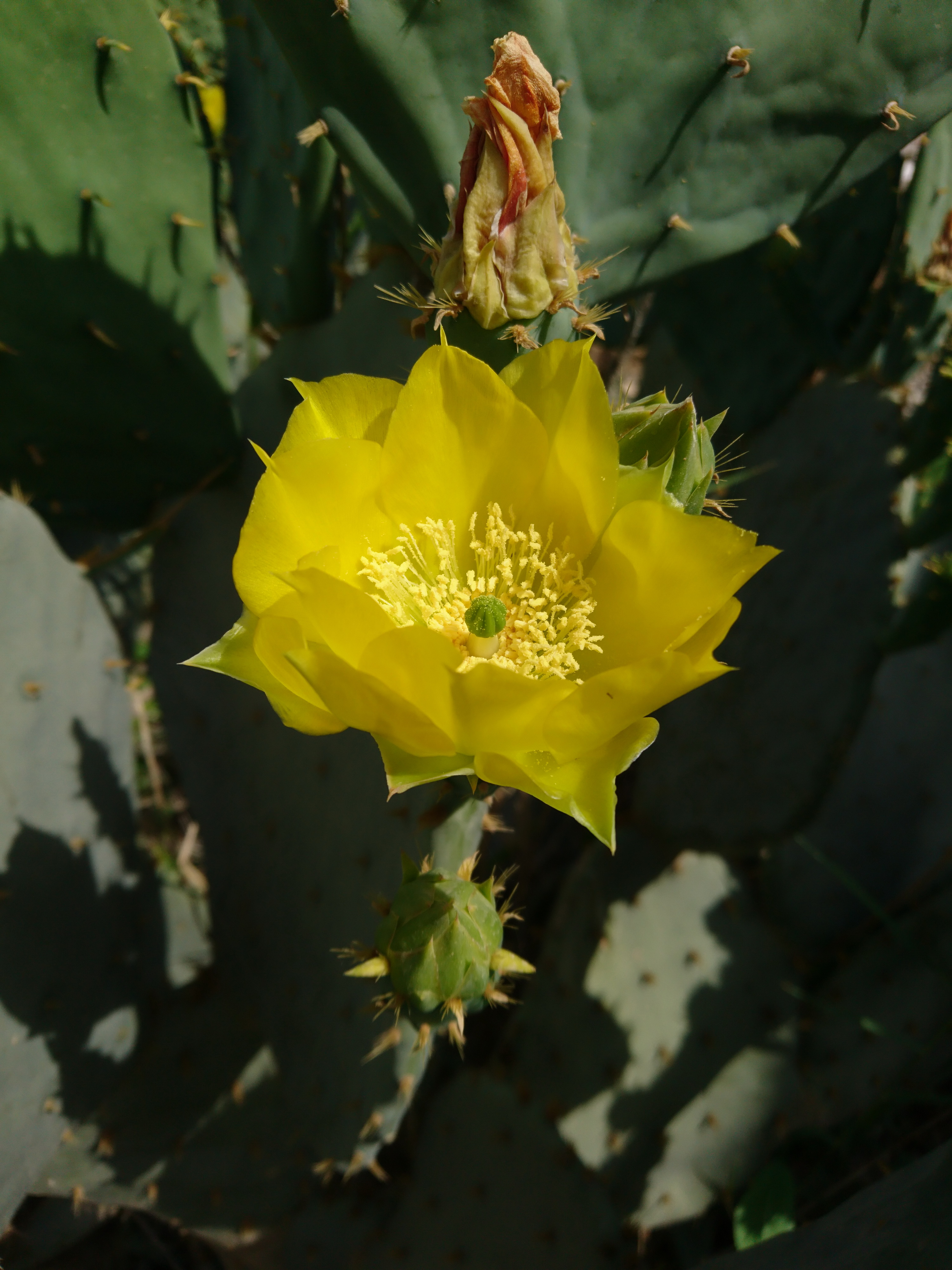
O. lindheimeri, Behbahan

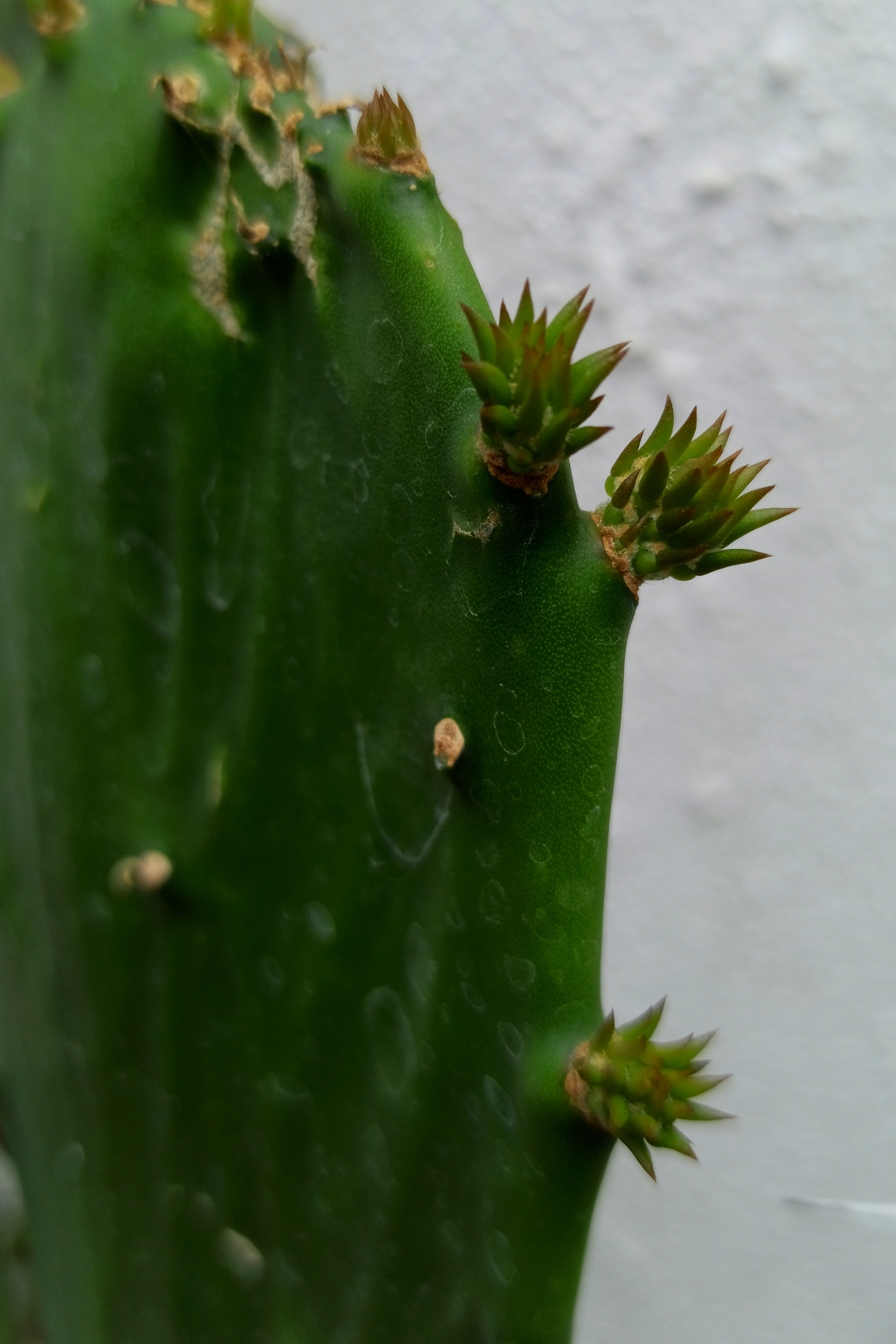
O. cochenillifera

When Carl Linnaeus published Species Plantarum in 1753 – the starting point for modern botanical nomenclature – he placed all the species of cactus known to him in one genus, Cactus. In 1754, the Scottish botanist Philip Miller divided them into several genera, including Opuntia. He distinguished the genus largely on the form of its flowers and fruits.

Considerable variation of taxonomy occurs within Opuntia species, resulting in names being created for variants or subtypes within a species, and use of DNA sequencing to define and isolate various species. The tendency towards hybridization also creates a tendency towards classifying what should be a specific subspecies of Opuntia into one of the larger umbrella species because different variations in form are assumed to be due to hybridization.

=== Species ===
See List of Opuntia species

Opuntia hybridizes readily between species. This can make classification difficult, yielding a reticulate phylogeny where different species come together in hybridization. Opuntia also has a tendency for polyploidy. The ancestral diploid state was 2n=22, but many species are hexaploid (6n = 66) or octaploid (8n = 88).

=== Formerly in Opuntia ===
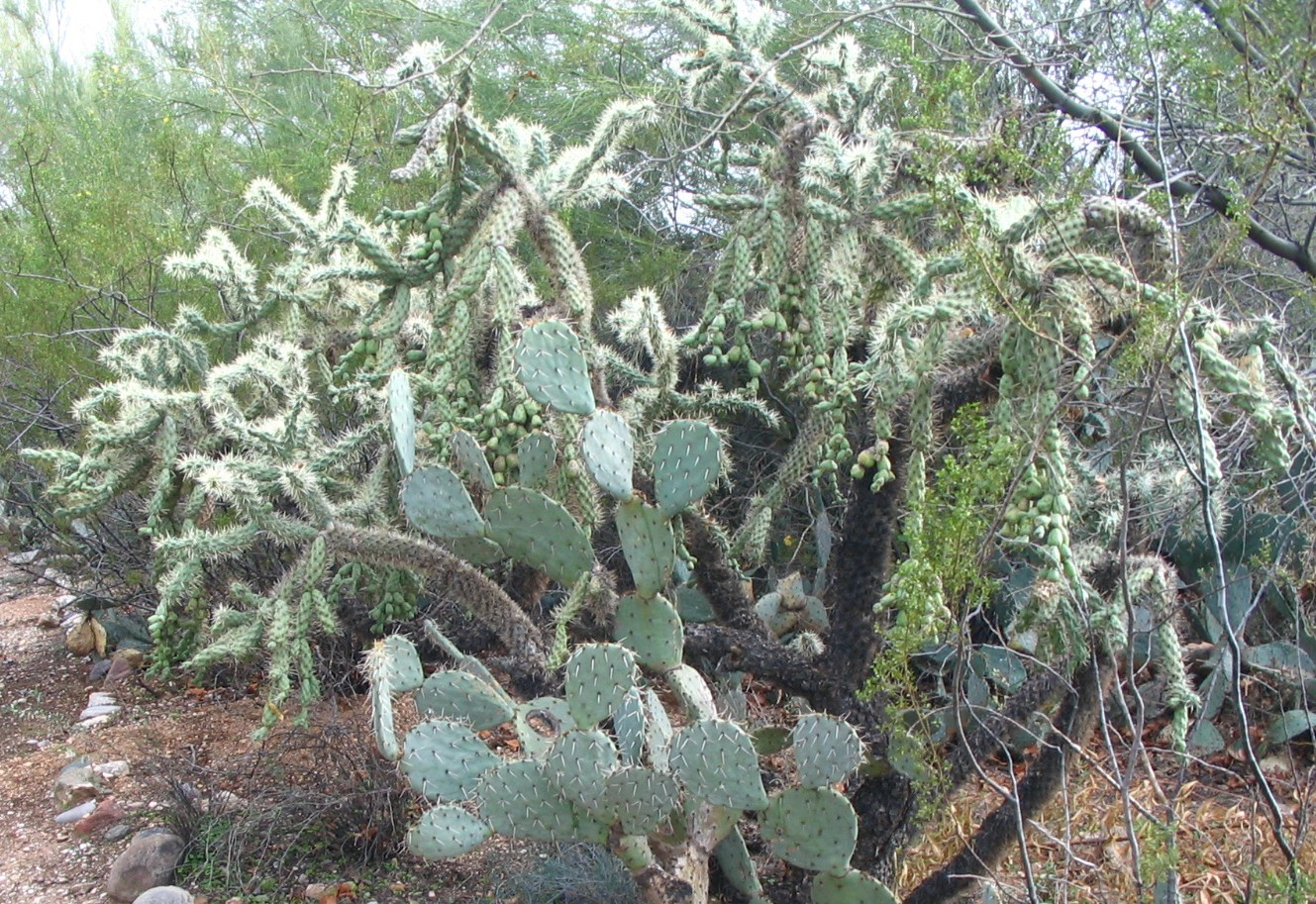
O. engelmannii in front of a jumping cholla (Cylindropuntia fulgida)

- Austrocylindropuntia
- Brasiliopuntia
- Corynopuntia
- Cylindropuntia
- Disocactus phyllanthoides (as O. speciosa)
- Micropuntia
- Miqueliopuntia

==== Chollas ====
Chollas, now recognized to belong to the distinct genus Cylindropuntia, are distinguished by having cylindrical, rather than flattened, stem segments with large barbed spines. The stem joints of several species, notably the jumping cholla (C. fulgida), are very brittle on young stems, readily breaking off when the barbed spines stick to clothing or animal fur as a method of vegetative reproduction. The barbed spines can remain embedded in the skin, causing discomfort and sometimes injury.

=== Breeding ===
One of the ancient homes of the cactus pear, Mexico, ran a breeding program in the 1960s. This effort at the Antonio Narro Agrarian Autonomous University (Universidad Autónoma Agraria Antonio Narro, UAAAN) produced improvements in some traits including cold-hardiness.

=== Chemistry ===
Opuntia contains diverse phytochemicals in variable quantities, such as polyphenols, dietary minerals, and betalains. Identified compounds under basic research include gallic acid, vanillic acid and catechins, as examples. Opuntia ficus-indica contains betalain, betanin, and indicaxanthin, with highest levels in their fruits.

== Distribution and habitat ==
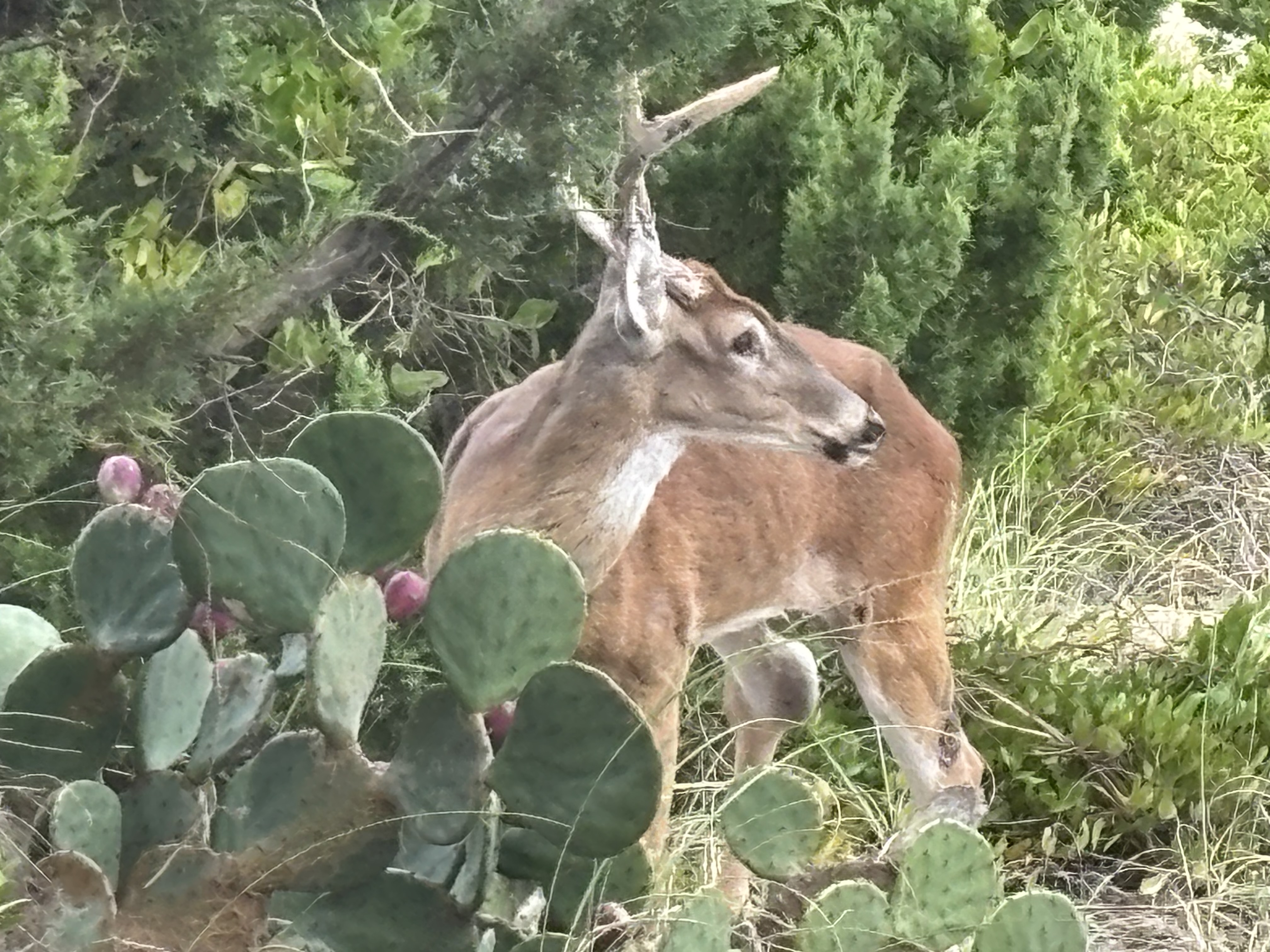
White-tailed deer grazing on prickly pear fruit on an oceanside dune on Hatteras Island in North Carolina.

Like most true cactus species, prickly pears are native only to the Americas. Through human action, they have since been introduced to many other areas of the world. Prickly pear species are found in abundance in Mexico, especially in the central and western regions, and in the Caribbean islands (West Indies). In the United States, prickly pears are native to many areas of the arid, semi-arid, and drought-prone Western and South Central United States, including the lower elevations of the Rocky Mountains and southern Great Plains, where species such as O. phaeacantha and O. polyacantha have become dominant, and to the desert Southwest, where several types are endemic. Prickly pear cactus is also native to sandy coastal beach scrub environments of the East Coast from Florida to southern Connecticut, where O. humifusa, O. stricta, and O. pusilla, are found from the East Coast south into the Caribbean and the Bahamas. Additionally, the eastern prickly pear is native to the midwestern "sand prairies" near major river systems, such as the Mississippi, Illinois, and Ohio rivers. The plant also occurs naturally in hilly areas of southern Illinois, and sandy or rocky areas of northern Illinois.

Opuntia species are the most cold-tolerant of the lowland cacti, extending into western and southern Canada. One subspecies, O. fragilis var. fragilis, has been found growing along the Beatton River in north-eastern British Columbia, southwest of Cecil Lake at 56° 17' N latitude and 120° 39' W longitude. Others are seen in the Kleskun Hills Natural Area of north-west Alberta at 55° 15' 30'' N latitude and 118° 30' 36'' W longitude.

Prickly pears produce a fruit known as tuna, commonly eaten in Mexico and in the Mediterranean region, which is also used to make aguas frescas. The fruit can be red, wine-red, green, or yellow-orange. In the Galápagos Islands, the Galápagos prickly pear, O. galapageia, has previously been treated as a number of different species, but is now only divided into varieties and subvarieties. Most of these are confined to one or a few islands, so they have been described as "an excellent example of adaptive radiation". On the whole, islands with tall, trunked varieties are also the home of giant tortoises, whereas islands lacking tortoises have low or prostrate forms of Opuntia. Prickly pears are a prime source of food for the common giant tortoises in the Galápagos Islands, so they are important in the food web.

Charles Darwin was the first to note that the cacti have thigmotactic anthers. When the anthers are touched, they curl over, depositing their pollen on the pollinator. That movement can be seen by gently poking the anthers of an open Opuntia flower. The same trait has evolved convergently in other genera (e.g. Lophophora).

Natural distribution of the plant occurs via consumption and associated seed dispersal by many animals, including antelopes, nonhuman primates, elephants, birds, and humans. When ingested by elephants, the sharp components of the plant cause harm to the mouth, stomach, and intestines.

Prickly pears (mostly O. stricta) were originally imported into Europe during the 16th century. They are now found in the Mediterranean region of Northern Africa, especially in Algeria, Morocco and Tunisia, where they grow all over the countryside, and in parts of Southern Europe, especially Spain, where they can be found in the east, south-east, and south of the country, and also in Malta, where they grow all over the islands, and in southern Italy, especially in Sicily and Sardinia. They can be found in enormous numbers in parts of South Africa, where they were introduced from South America.

The prickly pear is considered an invasive species in Australia, Ethiopia, South Africa, and Hawaii, among other locations.

=== Australia ===
The first introduction of prickly pears into Australia is ascribed to the founding governor of the New South Wales colony, Arthur Phillip, and the earliest European colonists, in 1788. Brought from Brazil to Sydney, they were most likely O. monacantha. That variety did not spread beyond the east coast. However, a number of other types of prickly pear were introduced to Australian gardens in the mid-19th century. The cactus was also used as agricultural fencing and a feedstock for animals in times of drought, as well as in an attempt to establish a cochineal dye industry.

The cactus became a widespread invasive weed in the dry interior climate west of the Great Dividing Range, in New South Wales and Queensland, eventually converting 260,000 square kilometres (101,000 mi^{2}) of farming land into an impenetrable green jungle of prickly pears in places 6 m (20 ft) high. Scores of farmers were driven off their land by what they called the "green hell", and their abandoned homes were crushed under the cactus growth, which advanced at a rate of 400,000 hectares (1 million acres) per year.

In 1919, the Australian federal government established the Commonwealth Prickly Pear Board to coordinate efforts with state governments to eradicate the weed. Early attempts, comprising mechanical removal and poisonous chemicals failed. As a last resort, biological control was attempted. In 1925, the Cactoblastis cactorum moth was introduced from South America, and its larvae rapidly began to control the infestation. Alan Dodd, the son of the noted entomologist Frederick Parkhurst Dodd, was a leading official in combating the prickly pear. A memorial hall in Boonarga, Queensland, commemorates the efforts of the moth. The release of cochineal insects, which eat the cactus and simultaneously kill the plant, has also proven an effective measure for combating its spread.

=== South Africa ===
In South Africa, many species of Opuntia are considered highly invasive including O. aurantiaca, O. elata, O. engelmannii, O. ficus-indica, O. humifusa, O. leucotricha, O. microdasys, O. monacantha, O. pubescens, O. robusta, O. salmiana, O. spinulifera, O. stricta and O. tomentosa. These species are classified as Category 1 invaders, and targeted for national eradication; most activities with regards to the species are prohibited (such as importing, propagating, introducing, translocating or trading). It was also found that invasive Opuntia species have adverse effects on the beetle population in the Kruger National Park, and widespread invasions alter soil characteristics.

== Ecology ==
O. ficus-indica thrives in regions with mild winters having a prolonged dry spell followed by hot summers with occasional rain and relatively low humidity. A mean annual rainfall of 350–500 millimetres (14–19 1/2 in) provides good growth rates. O. ficus-indica proliferates in various soils ranging from subacid to subalkaline, with clay content not exceeding 15–20% and the soil well drained. The shallow root system enables the plant to grow in shallow, loose soils, such as on mountain slopes. Opuntia spreads into large clonal colonies, which contribute to its being considered a noxious weed in some places.

Opuntia species are primarily pollinated by bees, including some bee genera (Diadasia and Lithurgus) that contain specialist pollinators (oligoleges) that exclusively visit Opuntia. Only a few Opuntia species, such as O. cochenillifera and O. stenopetala, are pollinated by hummingbirds.

Animals that eat Opuntia include the prickly pear island snail and Cyclura rock iguanas. The fruit are relished by many arid-land animals, chiefly birds, which thus help distribute the seeds. Opuntia pathogens include the sac fungus Colletotrichum coccodes and Sammons' Opuntia virus. The ant, Crematogaster opuntiae, and spider, Theridion opuntia, are named because of their association with the prickly pear cactus.

== Toxicity ==
Although the plants are edible, the pointed hairs should not be eaten, and similar species with milky sap are suspect.

== Uses ==
Prickly pear, raw
Nutritional value per 100 g (3.5 oz)
- Energy: 172 kJ (41 kcal)
- Carbohydrates: 9.6 g
- Dietary fiber: 3.6 g
- Fat: 0.5 g
- Protein: 0.7 g
Vitamins and minerals
Vitamins	Quantity %DV^{†}
Vitamin A equiv.	3% 25 μg
Riboflavin (B2)	8% 0.1 mg
Niacin (B3)	3% 0.5 mg
Vitamin B6	6% 0.1 mg
Folate (B9)	2% 6 μg
Vitamin C	16% 14.0 mg
Vitamin E	0% 0 mg
Minerals	Quantity %DV^{†}
Calcium	4% 56 mg
Iron	2% 0.3 mg
Magnesium	20% 85 mg
Phosphorus	2% 24 mg
Potassium	7% 220 mg
Zinc	1% 0.1 mg
- Other constituents: Quantity
- Water: 88 g
- Full Link to USDA Database entry
- ^{†}Percentages estimated using US recommendations for adults, except for potassium, which is estimated based on expert recommendation from the National Academies.

=== Nutrition ===
Raw opuntia leaves are 88% water, 10% carbohydrates, and less than 1% both of protein and fat (table). In a reference amount of 100 grams (3.5 oz), raw leaves provide 41 calories of food energy, 16% of the Daily Value (DV) for vitamin C, and 20% DV for magnesium, with no other micronutrients in significant content (table).

=== Regional food uses ===
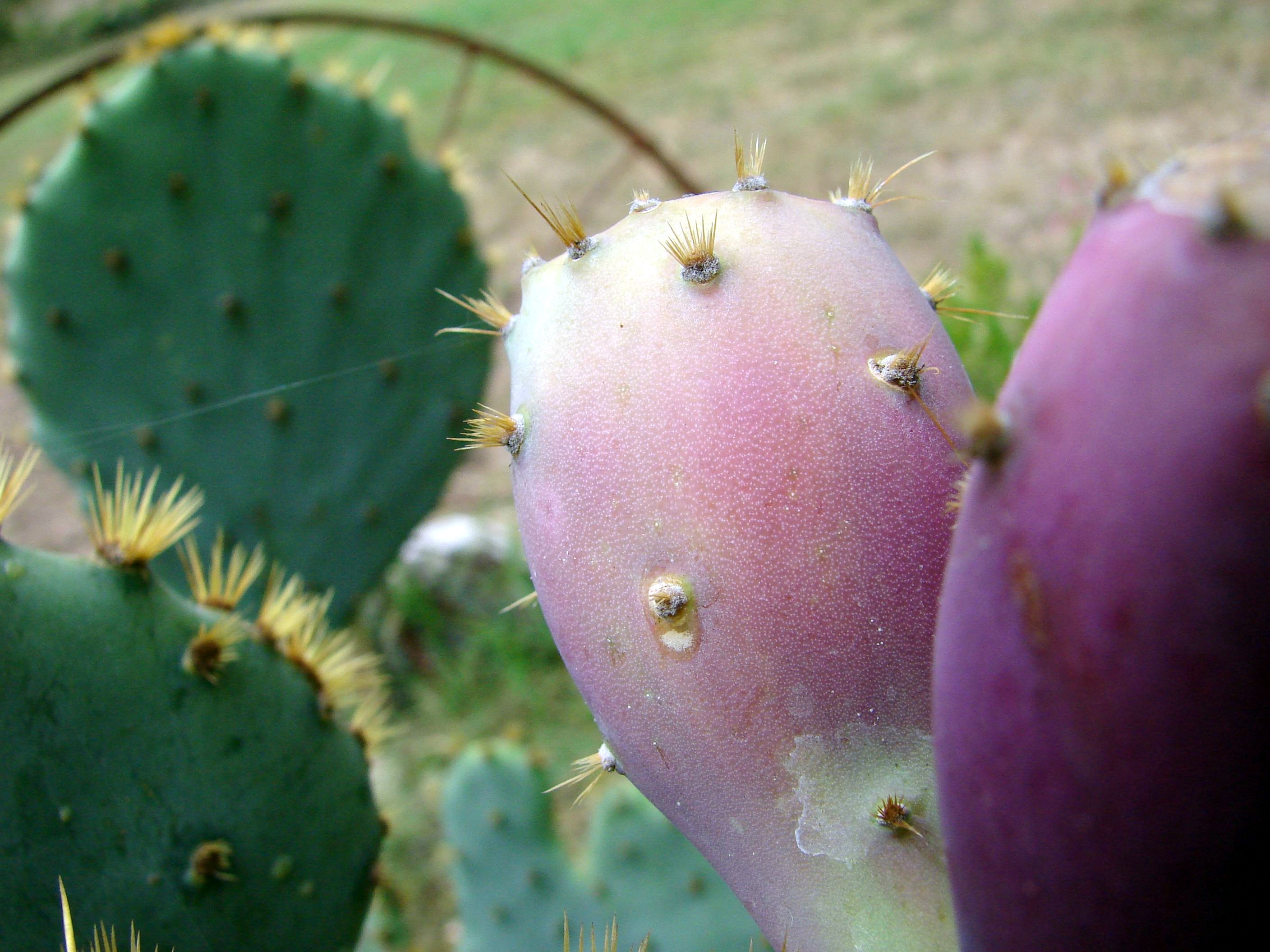
Close-up of prickly pear fruit: Apart from the large spines, the glochids (the fine prickles, or bristles) may dislodge and cause skin or eye irritation.

The pads (cladodes) of prickly pears, commonly called cactus fruit, cactus fig, Indian fig (meaning "Native American", not "of India"), nopales or tuna in Spanish, is edible, although it must be peeled carefully to remove the small spines on the outer skin before consumption. If the outer layer is not properly removed, glochids can be ingested, causing discomfort of the throat, lips, and tongue, as the small spines are easily lodged in the skin. Native Americans like the Tequesta would roll the fruit around in a suitable medium (e.g. grit) to "sand" off the glochids. Alternatively, rotating the fruit in the flame of a campfire or torch has been used to remove the glochids. Today, parthenocarpic (seedless) cultivars are also available. The seeds can be used for flour.

In Mexico, prickly pears are often used to make appetizers, soups, salads, entrees, vegetable dishes, breads, desserts, beverages, candy, jelly, and drinks. The young stem segments, usually called pads or nopales, are also edible in most species of Opuntia. They are commonly used in Mexican cuisine in dishes such as huevos con nopales (eggs with nopal), or tacos de nopales. Nopales are also an important ingredient in New Mexican cuisine. In 2009 it was introduced as a cheaper alternative to corn for the production of tortillas and other corn products. They can also be pickled.

Opuntia ficus-indica has been introduced to Europe, and flourishes in areas with a suitable climate, such as the south of France and southern Italy: In Sicily, they are referred to as fichi d'India (Italian literal translation of Indian fig) or ficurinia (Sicilian language literal translation of Indian fig). In Sardinia, they are called figumorisca ("Moorish figs"), the same denomination they receive along the Catalan-speaking regions of the Western Mediterranean, figa de moro. They can be found also in the Struma River in Bulgaria, in southern Portugal and Madeira (where they are called tabaibo, figo tuno, or "Indian figs"), in Andalusia, Spain (where they are known as higos chumbos). In Greece, it grows in such places as the Peloponnese region, Ionian Islands, or Crete, and its figs are known as frangosyka (Frankish, i.e. Western European, figs) or pavlosyka ("Paul's figs"), depending on the region. In Albania, they are called fiq deti translated as "sea figs", and are present in the south-west shore. The figs are also grown in Cyprus, where they are known as papoutsósyka or babutsa ("shoe figs").

The prickly pear also grows widely on the islands of Malta, where it is enjoyed by the Maltese as a typical summer fruit (known as bajtar tax-xewk, literally "spiny figs"), as well as being used to make the popular liqueur known as bajtra. The prickly pear is so commonly found in the Maltese islands, it is often used as a dividing wall between many of Malta's characteristic terraced fields in place of the usual rubble walls.

The prickly pear was introduced to Eritrea during the period of Italian colonisation between 1890 and 1940. It is locally known there as beles and is abundant during the late summer and early autumn (late July through September). The beles from the holy monastery of Debre Bizen is said to be particularly sweet and juicy.

In Morocco, Tunisia, Libya, Saudi Arabia, Jordan, and other parts of North Africa and the Middle East, prickly pears of the yellow and orange varieties are grown by the side of farms, beside railway tracks and other otherwise noncultivable land. It is sold in summer by street vendors, and is considered a refreshing fruit for that season.

Tungi is the local St. Helenian name for cactus pears. The plants (Indian fig opuntia) were originally brought to the island by the colonial ivory traders from East Africa in the 1850s. Tungi cactus now grows wild in the dry coastal regions of the island. Three principal cultivars of tungi grow on the island: the "English" with yellow fruit; the "Madeira" with large red fruit; and the small, firm "spiny red". Tungi also gives its name to a local Spirit distilled at The St Helena distillery at Alarm Forest, the most remote distillery in the world, made entirely from the opuntia cactus.

Cactus pear is being promoted and researched by ICARDA for India, Jordan, and Pakistan especially. It is an underappreciated crop in these countries and has undergone recent expansion in cultivated area. In some particular areas of India and Pakistan it has given a 30% increase in milk yield /hectare (/acre).

=== Folk medicine ===
In Mexican folk medicine, its pulp and juice are considered treatments for wounds and inflammation of the digestive and urinary tracts, although there is no high-quality evidence for any clinical benefit of using opuntia for these purposes.

Prior to modern medicine, Native Americans and Mexicans primarily used Opuntia as a coagulant for open wounds, using the pulp of the stem either by splitting the stem or scraping out the pulp.

=== Nutritional Benefits ===
Due to its high vitamin content (vitamin C, Betacarotene, and polyphenols,) is a nutritious plant which improves the immune system. It has a low glycemic index, is a digestive aid, and reduces "bad cholesterol" levels in the blood.

=== Other uses ===
==== Dye production ====
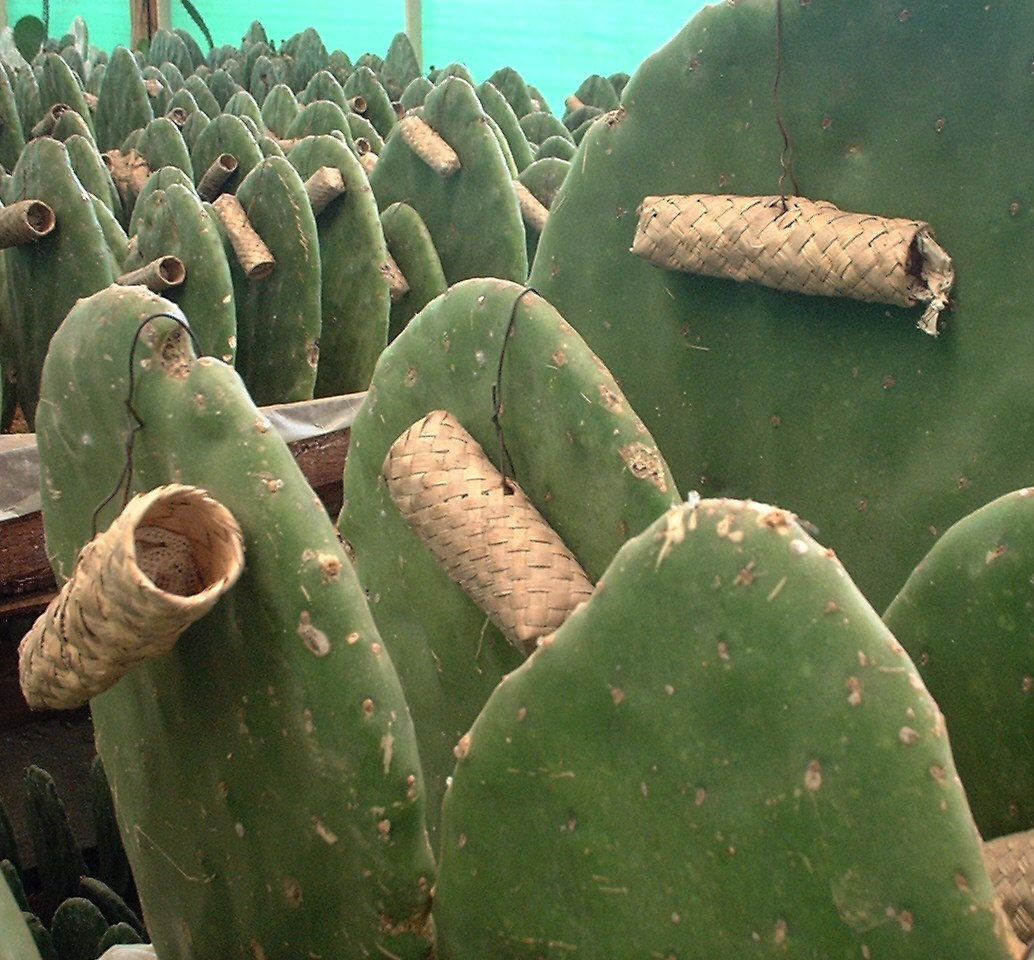
Traditional "Zapotec nest" farming of the cochineal scale insect on O. ficus-indica, Oaxaca

Dactylopius coccus is a scale insect from which cochineal dye is derived. D. coccus itself is native to tropical and subtropical South America and Mexico. This insect, a primarily sessile parasite, lives on cacti from the genus Opuntia, feeding on moisture and nutrients in the cactus sap. The insect produces carminic acid, which deters predation by other insects. The carminic acid can be extracted from the insect's body and eggs to make the red dye.

Cochineal is used primarily as a red food colouring and for cosmetics. The cochineal dye was used by the Aztec and Maya peoples of Central and North America, and by the Inca in South America. Produced almost exclusively in Oaxaca, Mexico, by indigenous producers, cochineal became Mexico's second-most valued export after silver. The dyestuff was consumed throughout Europe, and was so highly valued, its price was regularly quoted on the London and Amsterdam Commodity Exchanges.

The biggest producers of cochineal are Peru, the Canary Islands, and Chile. Current health concerns over artificial food additives have renewed the popularity of cochineal dyes, and the increased demand is making cultivation for insect farming an attractive opportunity in other regions, such as in Mexico, where cochineal production had declined again owing to the numerous natural enemies of the scale insect.

Apart from cochineal, the red dye betanin can be extracted from some Opuntia plants themselves. The Navajo people have traditionally produced a reddish dye from the fruit of the prickly pear cactus, used in dyeing woolen yarns.

==== Animal fodder ====
Cactus is used as a fodder crop for animals in arid and dryland regions. Some farmers prepare it with a fermentation method to remove the spines and increase digestibility.

==== Vegan leather ====
The thick skin of nopal cactus can be harvested as an environmentally-friendly leather replacement.

==== Biofuel ====
Bioethanol can be produced from some Opuntia species.

== Culture ==
The prickly pear cactus has been used for centuries both as a food source and a natural fence that keeps in livestock and marks the boundaries of family lands. They are resilient and often grow back following removal.

The emblem of Malta from 1975 to 1988

The 1975–1988 version of the emblem of Malta also featured a prickly pear, along with a traditional dgħajsa, a shovel and pitchfork, and the rising sun.

The prickly pear is the official plant of Texas by legislation from 1995.

The cactus lends its name to a song by British jazz/classical group Portico Quartet. The song "My Rival", on the album Gaucho by the American jazz-pop group Steely Dan begins with the words, "The wind was driving in my face/The smell of prickly pear."

In the fall of 1961, Cuba had its troops plant a 13-kilometre (8 mi) barrier of Opuntia cactus along the northeastern section of the 28-kilometre (17 mi) fence surrounding the Guantanamo Bay Naval Base to stop Cubans from escaping Cuba to take refuge in the United States. This was dubbed the "Cactus Curtain", an allusion to Europe's Iron Curtain and the Bamboo Curtain in East Asia.

Uruguayan-born footballer Bruno Fornaroli is nicknamed prickly pear due to his sometimes spiky hairstyles.

=== Mexico ===
The coat of arms of Mexico

The coat of arms of Mexico depicts a Mexican golden eagle, perched upon an Opuntia cactus, holding a rattlesnake. According to the official history of Mexico, the coat of arms is inspired by an Aztec legend regarding the founding of Tenochtitlan. The Aztecs, then a nomadic tribe, were wandering throughout Mexico in search of a divine sign to indicate the precise spot upon which they were to build their capital. Their god Huitzilopochtli had commanded them to find an eagle devouring a snake, perched atop a cactus that grew on a rock submerged in a lake. After 200 years of wandering, they found the promised sign on a small island in the swampy Lake Texcoco. There they founded their new capital, Tenochtitlan. The cactus (O. ficus-indica; Nahuatl: tenochtli), full of fruits, is the symbol for the island of Tenochtitlan.

=== Israeli-born Jews ===
The cactus fig is called tzabar in Hebrew (Hebrew: צבר). This cactus is also the origin of the term sabra used to describe any Jew born in Israel. The allusion is to a thorny, spiky skin on the outside, but a soft, sweet interior, suggesting, though the Israeli sabras are rough on the outside, they are sweet and sensitive once one gets to know them. This term is derived from the related Arabic word for this cactus صبار ṣubbār, where the related term sabr also translates to "patience" or "tenacity". According to a modern study, prickly pear was likely introduced to what is now the Land of Israel (the Levant) around the 18th century.

=== Palestinians ===
The prickly pear is also considered a national symbol of Palestine, having been grown across historic Palestine for centuries, traditionally being used to mark out land boundaries. The plant is seen by Palestinians as representing qualities of resilience and patience, as represented by the Palestinian proverb saber as-sabbar ("the patience of the cactus"). Its use as an emblem of Palestine has been traced to a painting produced by the artist Zulfa al-Sa'di in the 1930s. Its visibility was renewed by historical research carried out in the 1980s and 1990s on the Nakba, which revealed that many destroyed Palestinian villages subsequently saw regrowth of the cacti. The plant's ability to thrive anywhere is also considered to reflect the experiences of the Palestinian diaspora.

== Gallery ==
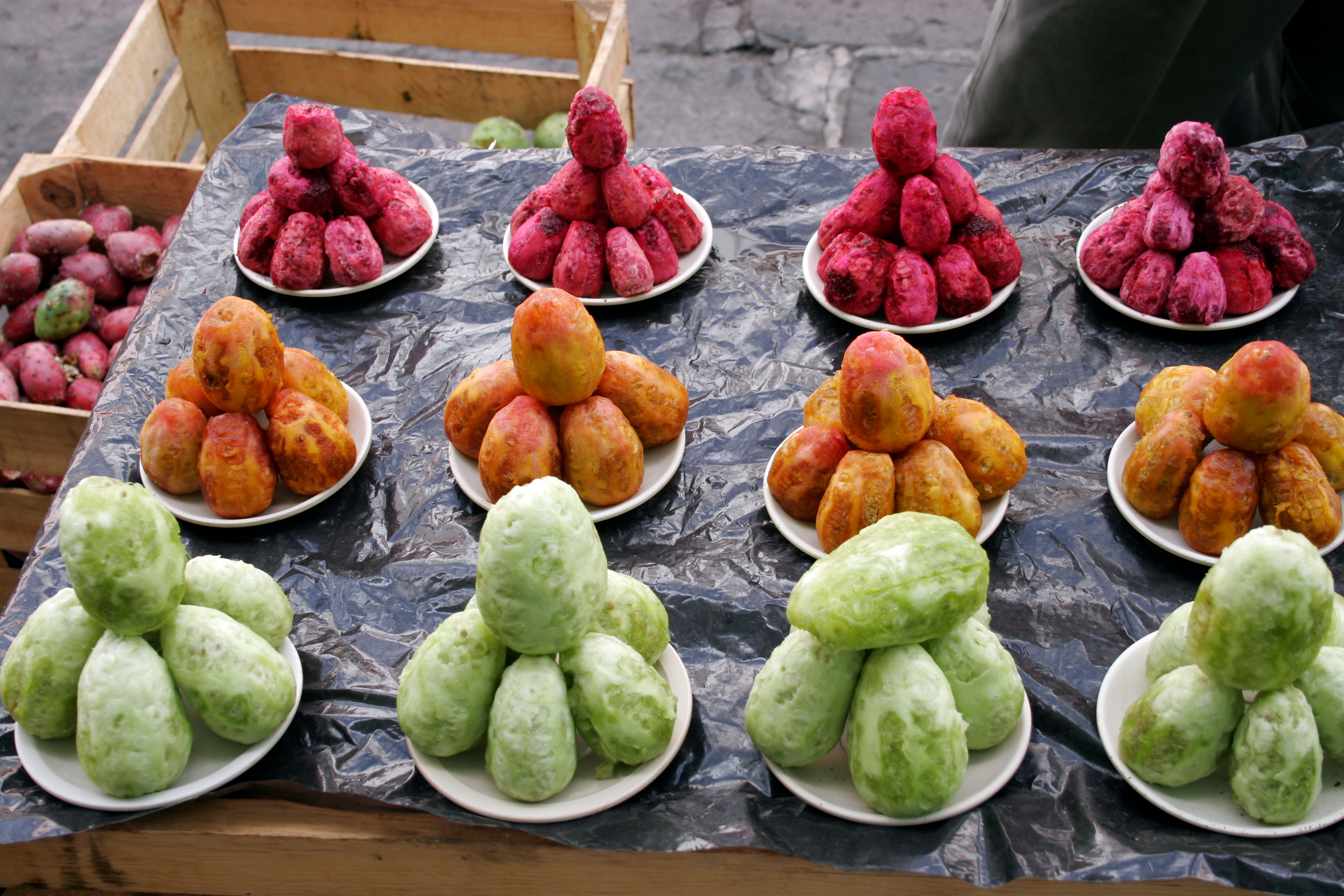
Prickly pear fruit at a market in Zacatecas, Mexico

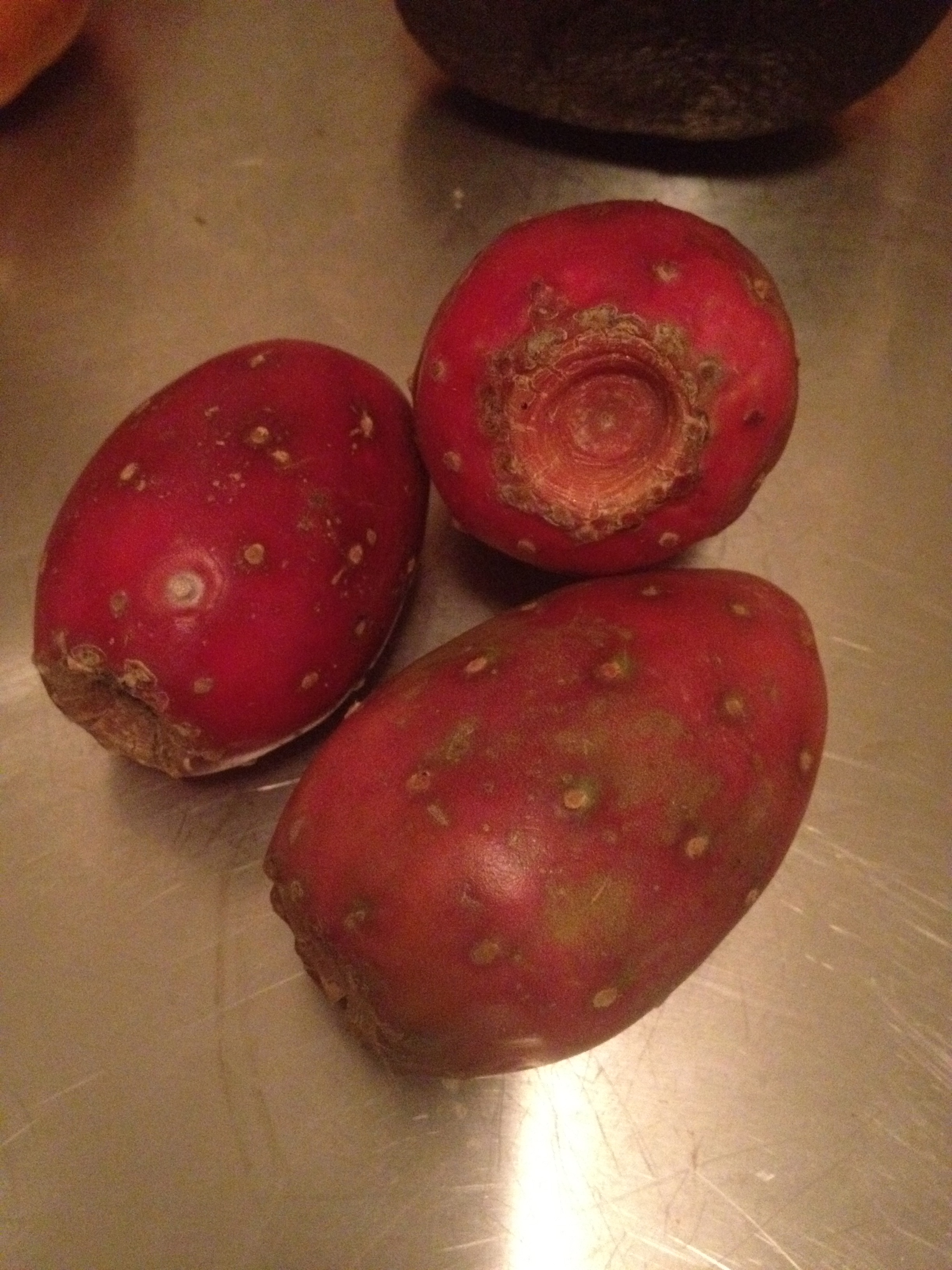
Close-up of fruit

Prickly pear fruit rinsed and drying in a colander

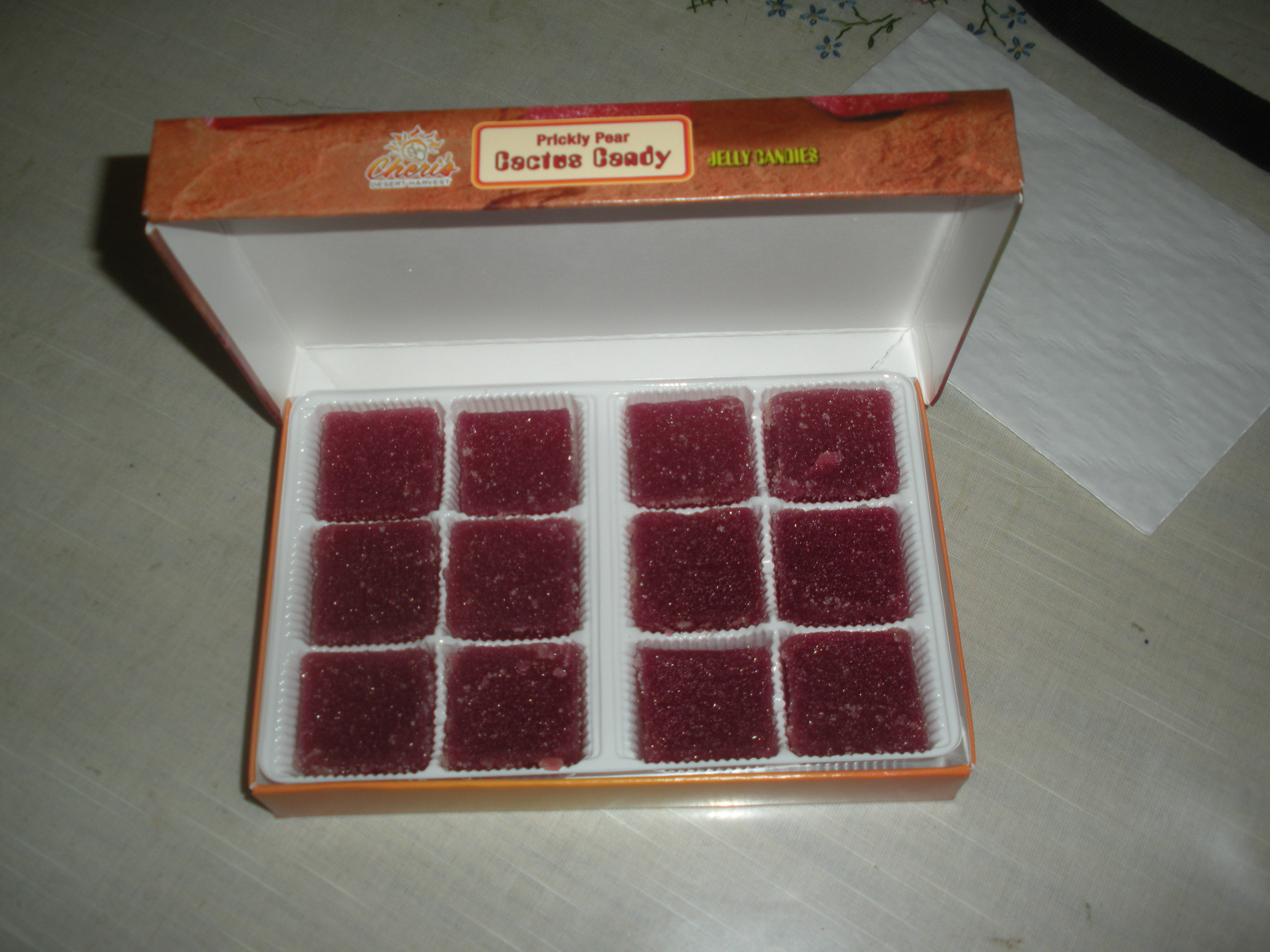
A box of prickly pear candy, often sold in Southwest U.S. gift shops

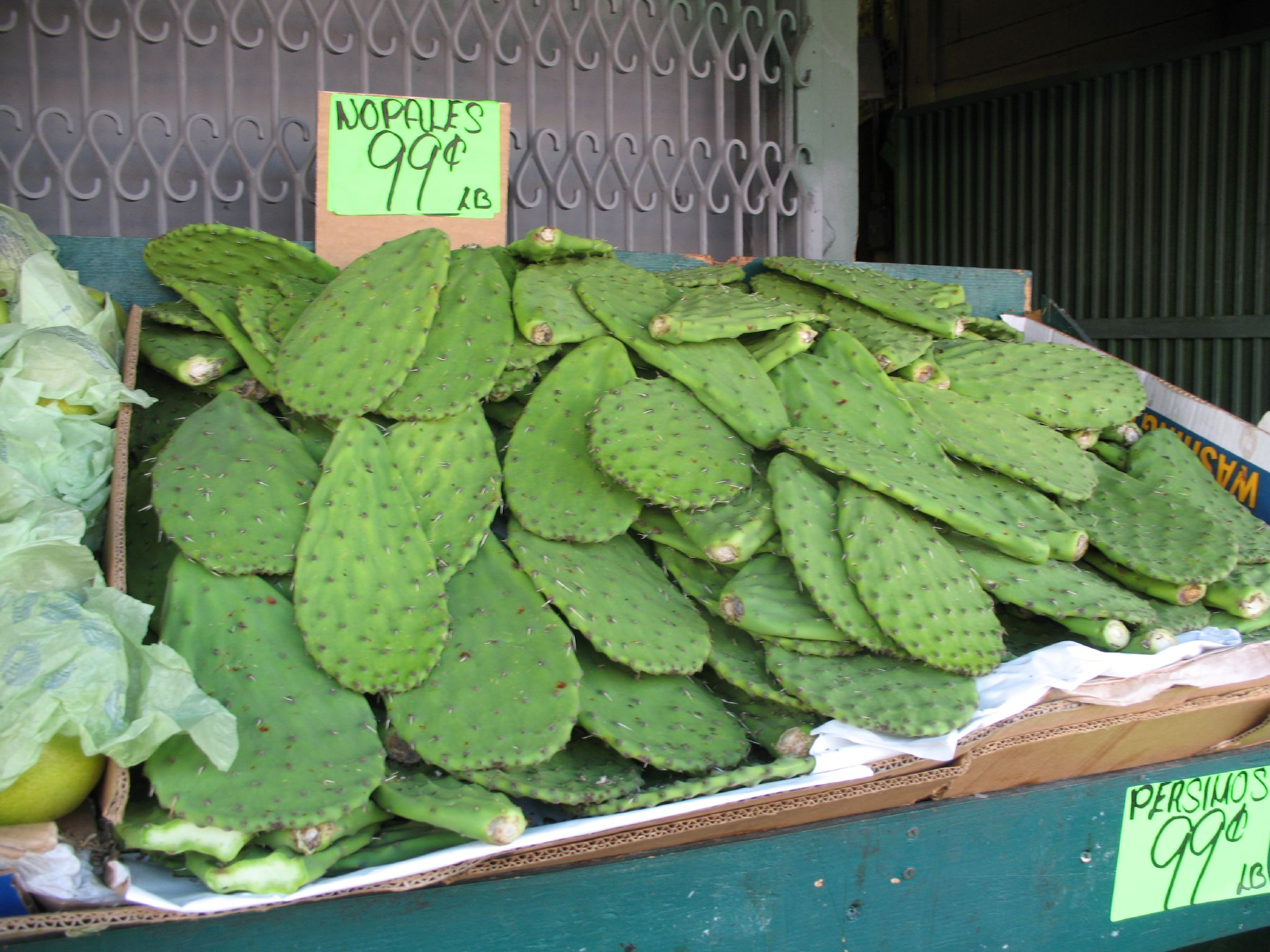
Nopales

Opuntia caracassana

== See also ==
- Pitaya
- Sabra (character)
- Sabra (person)
