= XESAL-AM =

Radio station in Saltillo, Coahuila

- Saltillo, Coahuila; Mexico
- Frequency: 1220 kHz
- Branding: Radio Universidad Agraria

Programming
- Format: University radio

Ownership
- Owner: Universidad Autónoma Agraria Antonio Narro

History
- First air date: 1995
- Call sign meaning: SALtillo

Technical information
- Licensing authority: CRT
- Class: B
- Power: 4.5 kW day
- Transmitter coordinates: 25°21′00″N 101°01′29″W

Links
- Website: radionarro.com.mx

XESAL-AM was a radio station serving Saltillo, Coahuila, Mexico, owned by the Universidad Autónoma Agraria Antonio Narro (UAAAN). Broadcasting on 1220 kHz, XESAL was a daytime-only radio station known as Radio Universidad Agraria.

The UAAAN failed to renew the permit for XESAL-AM in 2012, and the station is currently considered unlicensed.

XESAL-AM had to leave the air during night hours to prevent interference with XEB, the Class A station on 1220 AM.
