= KZEE =

Coordinates: 32°47′17″N 97°47′33″W

Weatherford, Texas; United States
- Broadcast area: Western section of Dallas-Fort Worth Metroplex
- Frequency: 1220 kHz
- Branding: "Hot Pepper 1220 AM"

Programming
- Format: Brokered South Asian

Ownership
- Owner: Tarrant Radio Broadcasting

History
- First air date: 1956
- Call sign meaning: None. It was randomly issued by the FCC

Technical information
- Licensing authority: FCC
- Class: D (Application for B)
- Power: 1600 Watts (Daytime); 200 Watts (Nighttime)

Links
- Public license information: Public file; LMS
- Website: Radio1220am.com

KZEE (1220 kHz Radio Hot Pepper 1220 AM) is a commercial AM radio station licensed to Weatherford, Texas, and serving the western section of the Dallas-Fort Worth Metroplex. It is owned by Tarrant Radio Broadcasters and airs a South Asian radio format featuring Bollywood music and talk. Most of the schedule is brokered programming, where hosts buys time on the station and may use it to advertise their clients while doing their shows.

KZEE broadcasts by day at 1,600 watts. But at night, to protect other stations on 1220 AM, it reduces power to 200 watts. A directional antenna is used at all times. The transmitter is on Lucas Street at Eden Road in Weatherford.

== History ==
KZEE began broadcasting as a Top 40 radio station in August 1956. Originally owned by Tom Gibson and Ed McLemore, it was later owned by Horace Boren who sold it to J. Fred Case dba Bartlesville Broadcasting Corp. In 1966, the station, in response to John Lennon’s statement about Jesus Christ, “damned their (Beatles) songs eternally.”

The station was sold in the 1970s to Galen Gilbert dba Community Service Radio Group. In the 1980s it went through a succession of other owners until 2005 when the station flipped its format to South Asian programming under its current ownership.
