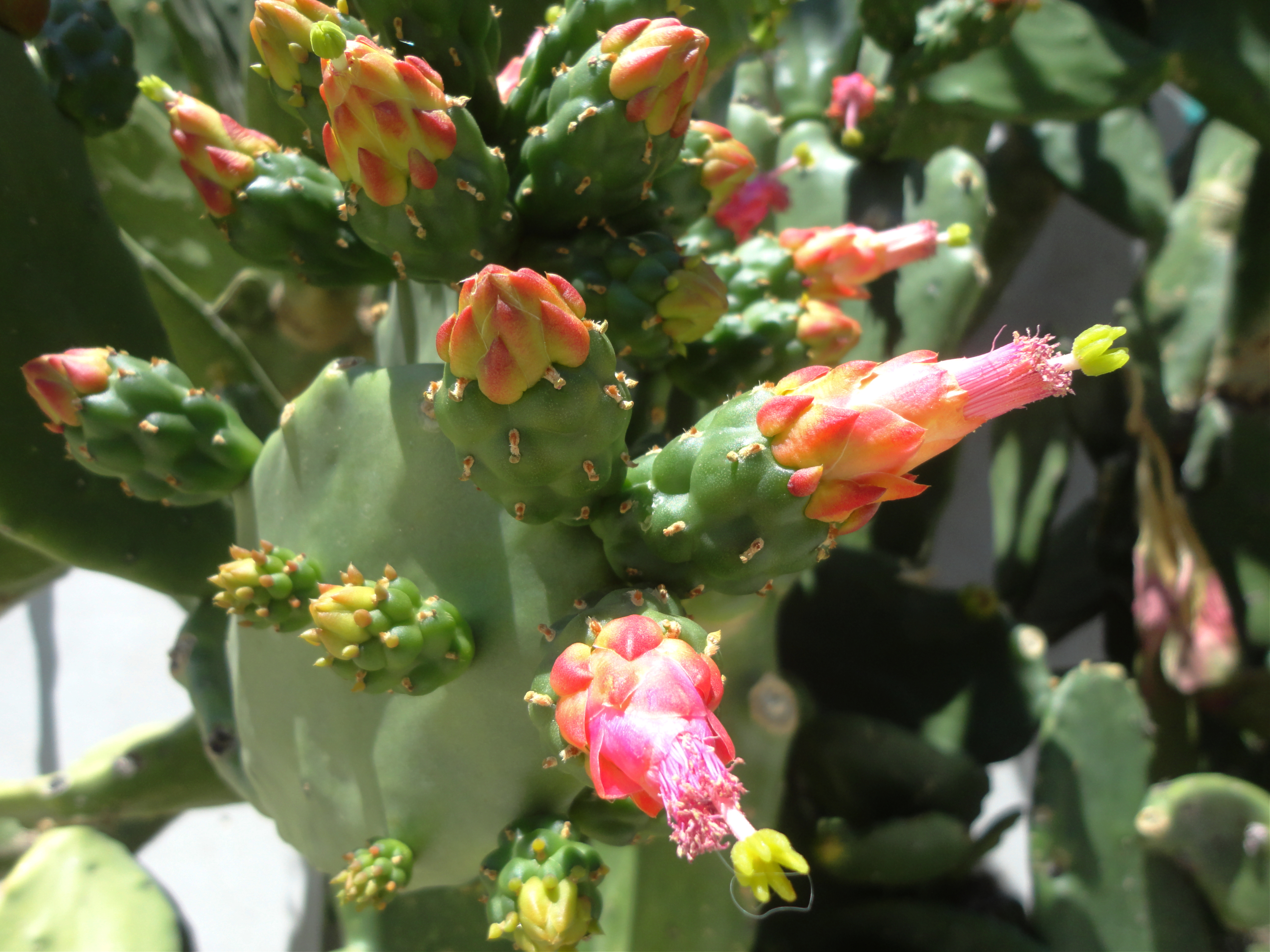

Conservation status
- Data Deficient (IUCN 3.1)

Scientific classification
- Kingdom: Plantae
- Clade: Tracheophytes
- Clade: Angiosperms
- Clade: Eudicots
- Order: Caryophyllales
- Family: Cactaceae
- Genus: Opuntia
- Species: O. cochenillifera

Binomial name
- Opuntia cochenillifera (L.) Mill., 1768

Synonyms
- Opuntia nuda Nopalea nuda Nopalea cochenillifera Cactus cochenilliferus Cactus cochenillifera Cactus cochenilifer

= Opuntia cochenillifera =

Species of cactus

Opuntia cochenillifera is a species of cactus in the subfamily Opuntioideae. It may have been endemic to Mexico, but has been widely introduced. The first description was in 1753 by Carl Linnaeus as Cactus cochenillifer. Philip Miller renamed it as Opuntia cochenillifera in 1768.

== Ecology ==
Unlike most Opuntia species, O. cochenillifera is pollinated by hummingbirds.

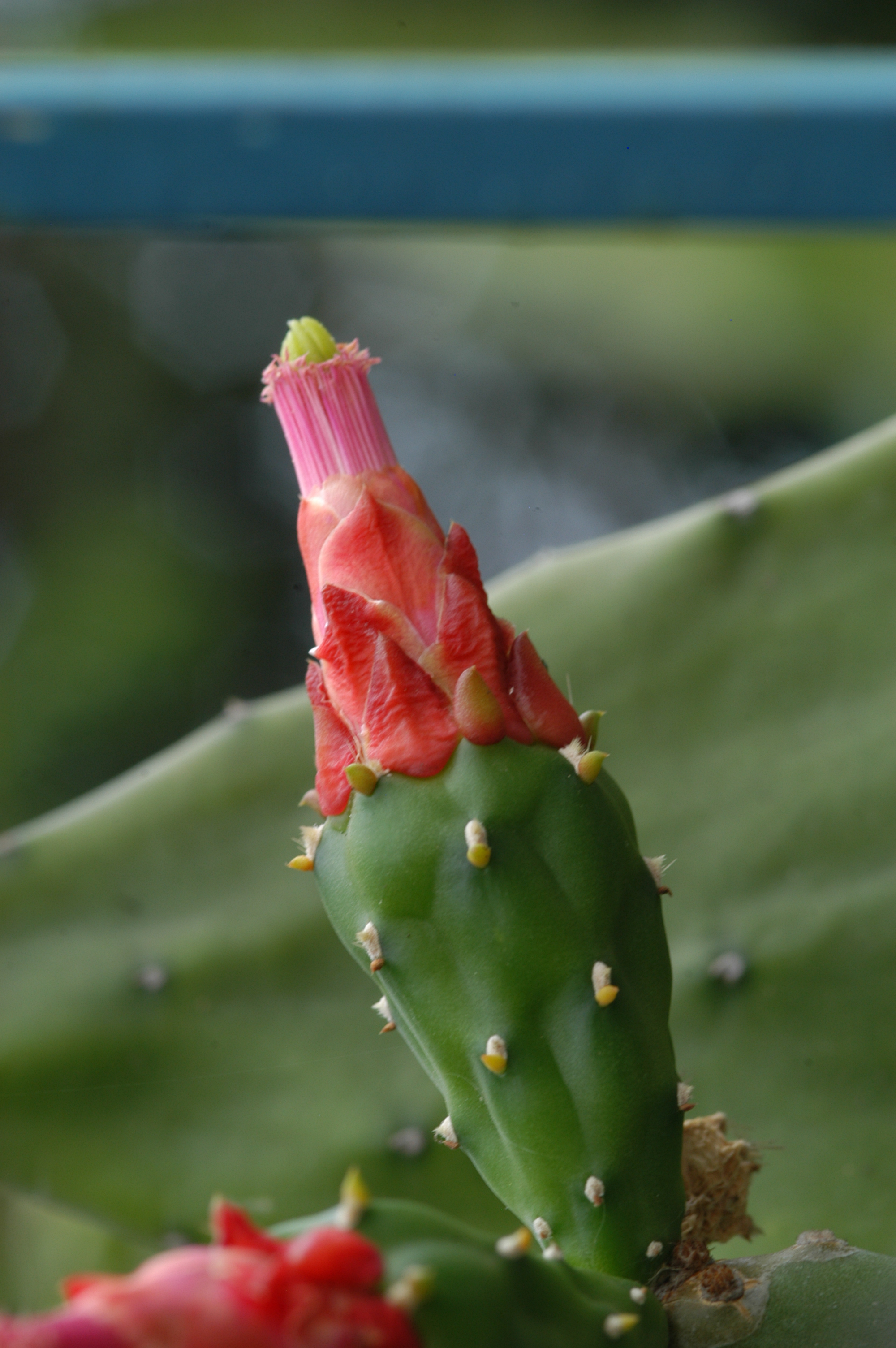
Flower
