= WZOT =

- Rockmart, Georgia; United States
- Broadcast area: Northwest Georgia
- Frequency: 1220 kHz
- Branding: Singing News Radio

Programming
- Format: Southern Gospel and Christian talk and teaching

Ownership
- Owner: Mark Lumpkin and Mark Garrett; (Heirborn Broadcasting, LLC)

History
- First air date: August 28, 1959
- Former call signs: WPLK (1959-1980s)

Technical information
- Licensing authority: FCC
- Facility ID: 7041
- Class: D
- Power: 500 watts day 103 watts night
- Transmitter coordinates: 34°0′14.00″N 85°3′22.00″W
- Translator: 101.9 W270CE (Rome)

Links
- Public license information: Public file; LMS
- Webcast: Listen Live
- Website: wzotradio.com

WZOT (1220 kHz) is a commercial Christian AM radio station broadcasting a Southern Gospel format, including Christian talk and teaching shows. Licensed to Rockmart, Georgia, United States, the station is owned by Mark Lumpkin and Mark Garrett, through licensee Heirborn Broadcasting, LLC. It uses the slogan “Hometown radio”. Singing News Radio is broadcast during the overnight hours.

The station is located at 602 West Elm Street in Historic Downtown Rockmart.

WZOT is also heard on 240 watt FM translator W270CE at 101.9 MHz in Rome. WZOT is one of two radio stations in Polk County and one of the very few solely Southern Gospel formatted radio stations in the United States. WPLK/WZOT was home to the legendary broadcaster Ned Ingle.

== History ==
On August 28, 1959, the station first signed on as WPLK. Originally, it was a daytimer, required to go off the air at night. In 1972, it added an FM station, 107.1 WZOT. In the 1980s, when the FM station was sold and switched its call sign to WTSH-FM, the AM station switched its call letters to WZOT.

WZOT briefly transferred to a solid country format before closing in 2014. It was used as a satellite station broadcasting country programming from Rome's 93.5. Before this, it had also broadcast Hispanic programming.

In 2016, Heirborn Ministries leased the building, returning it to a solely Southern Gospel format. The station added another FM transmitter, 101.9 FM. The station can also be heard virtually on the TuneIn App, with listeners as far away as Sweden.

The station is currently operated by broadcaster Brian McDowell.
