= KTLV =

Radio station in Midwest City–Oklahoma City, Oklahoma

- Midwest City, Oklahoma; United States
- Broadcast area: Oklahoma City Metroplex
- Frequency: 1220 kHz
- Branding: Key to Living Victoriously

Programming
- Format: Urban Gospel - Christian talk and teaching

Ownership
- Owner: First Choice Broadcasting, Inc.

History
- First air date: April 1973
- Former call signs: KRMC (1973–1987)
- Call sign meaning: From "Twelve"-Twenty, after 1987 ownership change; -or-; Key to Living Victoriously (branding)

Technical information
- Licensing authority: FCC
- Facility ID: 21555
- Class: D
- Power: 250 watts day; 5 watts night
- Transmitter coordinates: 35°23′50.00″N 97°27′4.00″W

Links
- Public license information: Public file; LMS
- Webcast: Listen live
- Website: Official website

KTLV (1220 AM) is a radio station broadcasting an Urban Gospel and Christian talk and teaching radio format. Licensed to Midwest City, Oklahoma, the station serves the Oklahoma City Metroplex. The station is currently owned by First Choice Broadcasting, Inc.

== History ==
M. W. Cooper and his Mid West Broadcasting Corporation, also part-owned by Tulsa state senator Gene C. Howard and Gene Stipe, put KRMC on the air in April 1973. A year later, the station changed formats and became one of the smallest-market all-news outlets in the country. A daytime-only outlet on a Mexican clear channel, the station's news service utilized the resources of United Press International. However, all-news was a financial failure losing $8,000 a month, prompting KRMC to change to gospel on October 13, 1975. One of the reasons cited by station management for the change was that an all-news format did not work well on a daytime-only station. Another was a change in operation; while not reflected in the records of the Federal Communications Commission, the Oklahoma City Counseling Center acquired the station in 1975.

In the early 1980s, KRMC almost negotiated an agreement with Oscar Rose Junior College by which Rose broadcasting students would have operated the station. However, this did not come to pass. The call letters were changed to the present KTLV on November 12, 1987, as the ownership renamed itself Twelve-Twenty Communications Corporation; the licensee name was changed to First Choice Broadcasting in 1992 as part of an internal reorganization.

1220 kHz in Oklahoma City was almost shut down as part of a 2002 deal with Clear Channel Communications that would have seen KTLV's intellectual unit move to 1340 kHz and Clear Channel move KGYN to Oklahoma City from Guymon, Oklahoma.
