= Universidad Autónoma Agraria Antonio Narro =

Mexican University

Coordinates: 25.3934°N 101.0005°W

Antonio Narro Agrarian Autonomous University
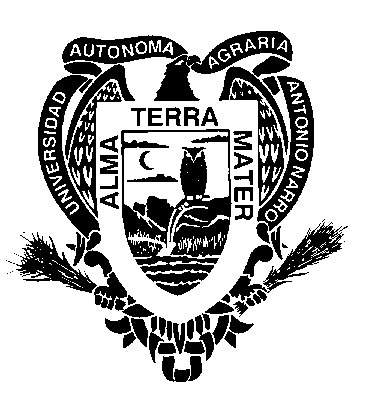
- Motto: Alma Terra Mater
- Motto in English: Earth is The Mother Who Feeds
- Type: Federal
- Established: March 4th, 1923
- Rector: Dr. Jesús Rodolfo Valenzuela García
- Administrative staff: 617
- Students: 3,552 (2000)
- Undergraduates: 3,344 (2000)
- Postgraduates: 278 (2000)
- Location: Blvd. Antonio Narro s/n. CP 25315, Saltillo, Coahuila, Mexico
- Campus: Suburban
- Colors: Black & gold
- Nickname: Vultures
- Website: www.uaaan.mx

The Antonio Narro Agrarian Autonomous University or Universidad Autónoma Agraria Antonio Narro in Spanish (UAAAN) is a public university in Mexico dedicated to the Agricultural, Silvicultural, Animal Production, food and Environmental Sciences. It is located 6 km (3.7 mi) south of Saltillo, in the Mexican state of Coahuila. The Antonio Narro Agrarian Autonomous University is one of the most important agricultural colleges of Latin America, and the "Narro" has national and international recognition in the agricultural and animal industry and the high academic level. There is also a campus in Torreón, Coahuila. It is also called "Universidad Antonio Narro" for short, or simply, "La Narro". In 2008 the UAAAN had an enrollment of about 4,500 students in both campuses, all in agriculture and related sciences.

== History ==
The Antonio Narro Agrarian Autonomous University (UAAAN) was founded on March 4, 1923, after the philanthropist Antonio Narro Rodríguez donated his Buenavista Estate for a public agricultural university, which became the "Regional School of Agriculture Antonio Narro". The main objective of this university consisted of preparing young people in a professional discipline of agricultural work in the field. Two months before dying on September 24, 1912, Antonio Narro Rodriguez had bequeathed a substantial part of its personal fortune: his property in Buenavista and $22,000 Mexican pesos, the value of six urban properties in the city of Saltillo, for constituting a school of agriculture.

Over the years, the university college changed its name several times. In 1938, it became the Superior School of Agriculture (Escuela Superior de Agricultura); by 1957, then became a founding institution of the University of Coahuila. In 1975, it became Antonio Narro Agrarian Autonomous University by a decree of the Coahuila state congress. Finally, in 2006, UAAAN was recognized as a Federal University, through a decree approved by the Chamber of Deputies and the Senate and published in the federal register by the President of Mexico, April 26, 2006.

In the 1990s, the university built and signed on a radio station, XESAL-AM 1220.

== Shield ==
The emblem that carries the Universidad Autónoma Agraria Antonio Narro expresses the ancestral eagle of Mexico, holding in its talons the spike of wheat as a symbol of life and bread.

== Physical setting ==
Climate at the main (Saltillo) campus of the UAAAN is dry semicalid; there are occasional freezes. Temperatures seldom drop below −2 °C (28 °F) (once in some years). Annual rainfall is about 300 mm (12 in). Natural vegetation is short, Chihuahuan desert brush of several species of Acacia; there are also Yucca spp., lechuguilla (Agave lechuguilla), creosotebush (Larrea tridentata), mesquite (Prosopis), and granjeno (Celtis).

== Facilities ==
The main (Saltillo) campus of the UAAAN occupies more than 4 square kilometres in a fertile valley a few kilometres south of the city of Saltillo on the Zacatecas highway. A substantial amount of this land is occupied by experimental and demonstrative plots, including annual and perennial crops like: corn, wheat, triticale; vegetables, such as temperate (Cruciferae: broccoli, cabbage), warm-season (Solanaceae: peppers, tomatoes), and others (squash, cilantro, onions, garlic, etc.); pecan and pistachio orchards; greenhouses (growing vegetables and ornamentals). All agriculture must use irrigation; there is no dryland agriculture. The university also includes animal production facilities (barns for intensive rearing of pigs, cows, goats, and dairy cows, mainly) including fistulated cattle. There is also has a cattle ranch (Rancho Los Angeles) (extensively colonized by the endangered Mexican prairie dog, Cynomys mexicanus); a reforestation woodland occupying more than 4 km^{2} (1.5 sq mi) of pines; and a botanical garden, featuring mainly desert plant species (cacti, agaves) and trees.

The UAAAN has several agricultural experimental fields across Mexico, encompassing climates from the wet tropics (Veracruz) to the Chihuahuan desert: Ocampo, Coahuila state; Matehuala, San Luis Potosi state (cactus botanical garden); Noria de Guadalupe, Zacatecas state; Cuencamé, Durango state. Also, in the Sierra Madre Oriental valleys: Navidad, Nuevo Leon (potato), and Los Lirios, Coahuila state (apple).

== Structure and academic programs ==
The Dirección de Licenciatura (Undergraduate Office) manages the 4-5 year undergraduate majors, including Ingeniero Agrónomo and majors in Horticultura, Producción, Parasitólogía, Forestal, Agrobiología, Zootecnia, Ciencia y Tecnología de Alimentos, Administración Agrícola, Desarrollo Rural, Mecánico Agrícola, Irrigación, Agrícola y Ambiental, Procesos Ambientales, Agroecología, Economia Agrícola y Agronegiocios, Medicina Veterinaria, and others. . The Direccion General Academica oversees international student programs, exchanges and stays.

=== Graduate programs ===
The Dirección de Posgrado (Graduate Office) directs graduate programs, including the Professional Master's in Seed Technology, and the Master's and Doctorates in Plant Breeding, Agrarian Sciences, Production Systems Engineering, Animal Sciences, and Plant Protection or Agricultural Parasitology.

=== International students ===
International student presence at the university has been steady. In recent years, students from Bolivia, Colombia, Ecuador, Paraguay, Panama, France, Ghana, Japan, Taiwan, Thailand, Nicaragua and the United States have attended the school.

== Cultural diffusion ==
The Universidad Autónoma Agraria Antonio Narro counts with different groups like cultural, civic, and artistics.

== Sports teams ==
UAAAN currently has the following sports disciplines:

- Football Soccer
- Basketball
- Rodeo
- Charreria
- Athletics
- Baseball
- American Football
- Boxing
- Tae Kwon Do
- Tochito Flag
- Softball
- Volleyball
- Athletics
- Soccer Uruguay

== Laguna Unit ==
The UAAAN Laguna Unit (UAAAN-UL) is located in the city of Torreón, Coahuila, Mexico, in the heart of the Laguna Region, on the peripheral road leading to Gomez Palacio, Durango, and the road to Santa Fe has an area of 37 ha (91 acres) of which about 2.5 are used in university facilities and the rest for agricultural activities and research practice. It consists of 42 classrooms, 20 laboratories, cubicles for teachers, sports facilities, dining room, a central library and an auditorium with capacity for 150 people. Student support services are available as internship, residency feminine, dining, transportation, nursing, language center, computer center and sports

=== History of Laguna Unit ===
The UAAAN-UL emerged from what was School of Veterinary Medicine of the Laguna, A. C., established in April 1975. This school emerged, in turn, from the merger of the schools of Veterinary Medicine of San Pedro de las Colonias and Torreón, Coahuila.

=== Academic programs of Laguna Unit ===
- Agronomist Parasitologist
- Horticulture Agronomist
- Irrigation Agronomist
- Agroecology Engineer
- Environmental Processes Engineer
- Doctor of Veterinary Medicine

== Doctor of Veterinary Medicine (DVM) ==
The Doctor of Veterinary Medicine or DVM Program (Medico Veterinario Zootecnista in Spanish)

In the Laguna Region (Torreón Municipality, Gómez Palacio Municipality, Lerdo Municipality), there are major food companies, such as:

- PillGrim's
- Lala
- MUMA
- MUR
- Bachoco
- Chilchota
- Nupplen
