= WENC =

Currently silent
- Whiteville, North Carolina; United States
- Broadcast area: Wilmington, North Carolina; Myrtle Beach, South Carolina; Lumberton, North Carolina; Elizabethtown, North Carolina
- Frequency: 1220 kHz
- Branding: Power1220 WENC

Programming
- Format: Gospel
- Affiliations: North Carolina News Network

Ownership
- Owner: Godwin Communications, LLC

History
- First air date: 1946
- Call sign meaning: Eastern North Carolina

Technical information
- Licensing authority: FCC
- Facility ID: 26000
- Class: D
- Power: 5,000 watts day; 152 watts night
- Transmitter coordinates: 34°18′30.6″N 78°42′59.1″W

Links
- Public license information: Public file; LMS

WENC (1220 AM) is a radio station licensed to Whiteville, North Carolina, United States. The station is owned by Godwin Communications, LLC.

WENC signed on in 1946, operating at 250 watts 24 hours a day. Whiteville Broadcasting Company owned the station until 1995, when J.L. "Big Jay" Godwin bought the station and became general manager. He changed the format from oldies to soul music, gospel and rhythm and blues with community news and obituaries. Tahitian McKenzie, Godwin's daughter, took over WENC after her parents' deaths but had to sign off after a year on December 31, 2024, because running the station was "not feasible" financially. The station is for sale.
