= Patricia Jiménez Delgado =

Mexican politician (born 1963)

Federal deputy for Durango's 4th
- Incumbent
- Assumed office 1 September 2024

Personal details
- Born: 6 November 1963 (age 62) Durango, Mexico
- Party: PAN
- Education: UJED
- Occupation: Politician

Silvia Patricia Jiménez Delgado (Note: In this Spanish name, the first or paternal surname is Jiménez and the second or maternal family name is Delgado.) (born 6 November 1963) is a Mexican politician from the National Action Party (PAN). A native of Durango, she has held several political offices in that state: most recently, representing its 4th congressional district in the Chamber of Deputies.

== Biography ==
Known since childhood as Paty Jiménez, she was born in central Durango in 1963. (Note: Sources differ as to whether in Guatimapé or Canatlán, some 40 kilometres (25 miles) distant.) One of seven children, her father died when she was young and her mother migrated northwards in search of work.

She graduated in accountancy from the Juárez University of the State of Durango (UJED) in 1987. While at university, she played for the women's basketball team, where her height – 1.70 metres (5.6 ft) – gave her a distinct advantage.

During the mid-1980s she also developed an interest in politics and joined the National Action Party. She has held various positions within the party structure, including state counsellor in 2014–2022, national counsellor in 2019–2022, and general secretary of the party in Durango in 2019. In 2015, she contended for the PAN's candidacy for the governorship of Durango, but lost to the eventual winner of the 5 June 2016 election, José Rosas Aispuro Torres.

Paty Jiménez was a member of the Durango municipal council in 2010–2013 has served two terms as a local deputy in the Congress of Durango: from 2016 to 2018, and from 2021 to 2024.

In the 2024 general election, she was the PAN's candidate for Durango's 4th congressional district, which covers the urban core of the state capital, Victoria de Durango. Running as the joint candidate of the Fuerza y Corazón por México coalition (in which the PAN allied itself with the Institutional Revolutionary Party (PRI) and the Party of the Democratic Revolution (PRD)), she secured a narrow victory (89,583 votes to 82,419) over Alfonso Primitivo Ríos Vázquez of the Sigamos Haciendo Historia coalition. She was duly elected to represent the district for the duration of the 66th Congress (2024–2027).
