= 4th federal electoral district of Durango =

Federal electoral district of Mexico

Durango's 4th
- Electoral district of the Chamber of Deputies of Mexico

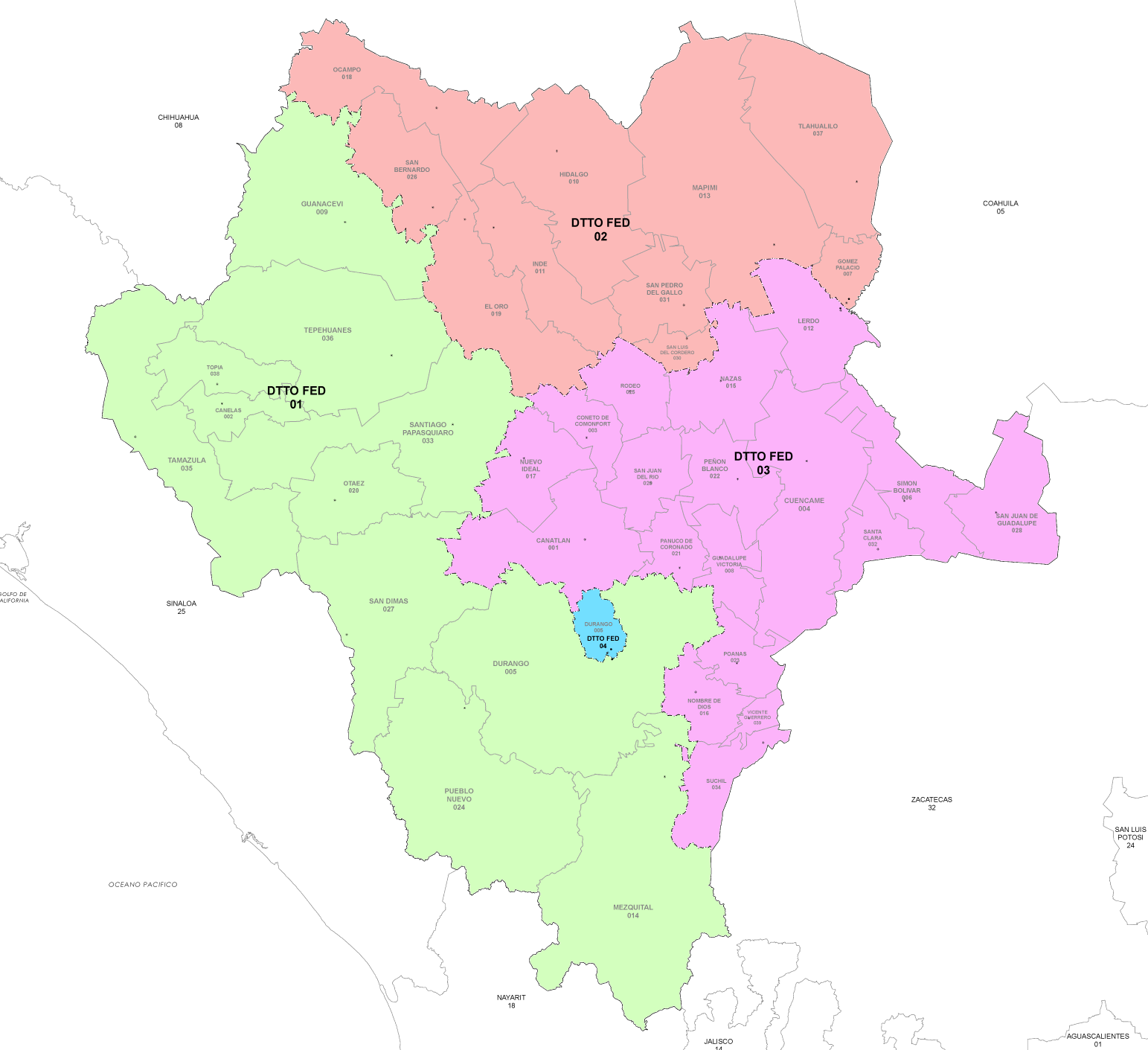
- 4th district since 2023

Incumbent
- Member: Patricia Jiménez Delgado
- Party: ▌National Action Party
- Congress: 66th (2024–2027)

District
- State: Durango
- Head town: Victoria de Durango
- Coordinates: 24°01′N 104°40′W
- Covers: Municipality of Durango (part)
- PR region: First
- Precincts: 414
- Population: 461,881 (2020 census)

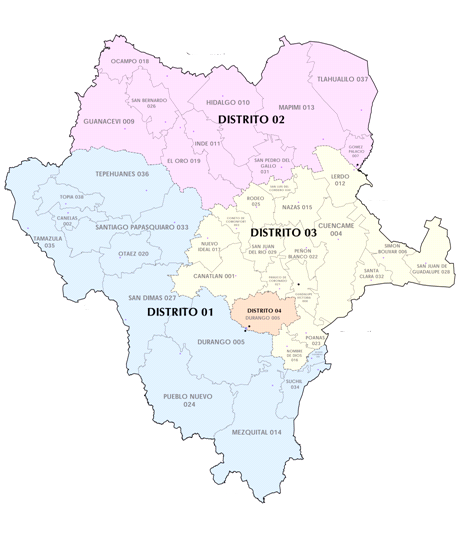
Durango under the 2017–2022 districting plan

The 4th federal electoral district of Durango (Spanish: Distrito electoral federal 04 de Durango) is one of the 300 electoral districts into which Mexico is divided for elections to the federal Chamber of Deputies and one of four such districts in the state of Durango.

The district elects one deputy to the lower house of Congress for each three-year legislative session through the first-past-the-post system. Votes cast in the district also contribute to the calculation of proportional representation ("plurinominal") deputies elected from the first region.

The current member for the district, elected in the 2024 general election, is Silvia Patricia Jiménez Delgado of the National Action Party (PAN).

== District territory ==
Under the 2023 districting plan adopted by the National Electoral Institute (INE), which is to be used for the 2024, 2027 and 2030 federal elections, the 4th district covers 414 electoral precincts (secciones electorales) in the mostly urban portion of the municipality of Durango excluded from the 1st district.

The head town (cabecera distrital), where results from individual polling stations are gathered together and tallied, is the state capital, the city of Victoria de Durango. The district reported a population of 461,881 in the 2020 census.

== Previous districting schemes ==
Evolution of electoral district numbers
	1974	1978	1996	2005	2017	2023
Durango	4	6	5	4	4	4
Chamber of Deputies	196	300				
Sources: INE, González Casanova, Baños/Palacios, INE

2017–2022

Between 2017 and 2022, the 4th district's head town was at Victoria de Durango and it covered 233 precincts in the north-east of the municipality.

2005–2017

Under the 2005 plan, Durango's single-member district count fell from five to four. This district's head town was at Victoria de Durango and it covered 220 precincts in the east of the municipality.

1996–2005

In the 1996 scheme, Durango's seats were reduced from six to five. The 4th district had its head town at Victoria de Durango and it comprised seven municipalities:
- Durango (113 precincts in the north of the municipality, with the remainder assigned to the 5th district), Pueblo Nuevo, Mezquital, Nombre de Dios, Poanas Súchil and Vicente Guerrero.

1978–1996

The districting scheme in force from 1978 to 1996 was the result of the 1977 electoral reforms, which increased the number of single-member seats in the Chamber of Deputies from 196 to 300. Under that plan, Durango's seat allocation rose from four to six. The reconfigured 4th district's head town was at Guadalupe Victoria and it covered 11 municipalities:
- Cuencamé, Coneto de Comonfort, General Simón Bolívar, Guadalupe Victoria, Pánuco de Coronado, Peñón Blanco, Poanas, Rodeo, San Juan de Guadalupe, San Juan del Río and Santa Clara,

== Deputies returned to Congress ==
(Mexico) National parties
- Current
- PAN
- PRI
- PT
- PVEM
- MC
- Morena
- PAZ
- Somos
- Defunct or local only
- PLM
- PNR
- PRM
- PNM
- PP
- PPS
- PARM
- PFCRN
- CON
- PANAL
- PSD
- PES
- PES
- PRD

Durango's 4th district
Election	Deputy	Party	Term	Legislature
1916	Fernando Castaños		1916–1917	Constituent Congress of Querétaro
1917	Alfonso Breceda		1917–1918	27th Congress
1918	Alfonso Breceda		1918–1920	28th Congress
1920	Rodrigo Gómez		1920–1922	29th Congress
1922	Rodrigo Gómez		1920–1924	30th Congress
1924	Rodrigo Gómez		1924–1926	31st Congress
1926	Vacant		1926–1928	32nd Congress
1928	Alfonso Cruz		1928–1930	33rd Congress
1930	Vacant		1930–1932	34th Congress
1932	Alejandro Antuna López		1932–1934	35th Congress
1934	Miguel León Tostado	Institutional Revolutionary Party	1934–1937	36th Congress
1937	Atanasio Arrieta	Institutional Revolutionary Party	1937–1940	37th Congress
1940	Manuel Solórzano Soto		1940–1943	38th Congress
1943	Juan Manuel Tinoco	Institutional Revolutionary Party	1943–1946	39th Congress
1946	Eulogio V. Salazar	Institutional Revolutionary Party	1946–1949	40th Congress
1949	Armando del Castillo Franco	Institutional Revolutionary Party	1949–1952	41st Congress
1952	Braulio Meraz Nevárez	Institutional Revolutionary Party	1952–1955	42nd Congress
1955	Pablo Picharra Esparza	Institutional Revolutionary Party	1955–1958	43rd Congress
1958	Ezequiel Nevárez Ramírez	Institutional Revolutionary Party	1958–1961	44th Congress
1961	José Antonio Ramírez Martínez	Institutional Revolutionary Party	1961–1964	45th Congress
1964	Braulio Meraz Nevárez	Institutional Revolutionary Party	1964–1967	46th Congress
1967	José Antonio Ramírez Martínez	Institutional Revolutionary Party	1967–1970	47th Congress
1970	Jacinto Moreno Villalba	Institutional Revolutionary Party	1970–1973	48th Congress
1973	José Mario Rivas Escalante	Institutional Revolutionary Party	1973–1976	49th Congress
1976	José Ramírez Gamero	Institutional Revolutionary Party	1976–1979	50th Congress
1979	Miguel Ángel Fragoso Álvarez	Institutional Revolutionary Party	1979–1982	51st Congress
1982	Maximiliano Silerio Esparza	Institutional Revolutionary Party	1982–1985	52nd Congress
1985	José Ramón García Soto	Institutional Revolutionary Party	1985–1988	53rd Congress
1988	María Albertina Barbosa	Institutional Revolutionary Party	1988–1991	54th Congress
1991	Benjamín Ávila Guzmán	Institutional Revolutionary Party	1991–1994	55th Congress
1994	Ricardo Pacheco Rodríguez	Institutional Revolutionary Party	1994–1997	56th Congress
1997	Ángel Sergio Guerrero Mier (Note: Guerrero Mier resigned his seat in March 1998 to contend (successfully) for the governorship of Durango.); Jesús Gutiérrez Vargas	Institutional Revolutionary Party	1997–1998; 1998–2000	57th Congress
2000	Gustavo Lugo Espinoza	Institutional Revolutionary Party	2000–2003	58th Congress
2003	Jaime Fernández Saracho	Institutional Revolutionary Party	2003–2006	59th Congress
2006	Jorge Salum del Palacio	National Action Party (Mexico)	2006–2009	60th Congress
2009	Jorge Herrera Caldera (Note: Herrera Caldera requested a leave of absence from his seat on 2 February 2010 to contend (successfully) for the governorship of Durango.); Pedro Ávila Nevárez	Institutional Revolutionary Party	2009–2010	61st Congress
2012	Jorge Herrera Delgado (Note: Herrera Delgado died in office on 24 November 2014. He was replaced by his alternate, Solís Nogueira.); Eduardo Solís Nogueira	Institutional Revolutionary Party	2012–2014; 2014–2015	62nd Congress
2015	Alicia Guadalupe Gamboa	Institutional Revolutionary Party	2015–2018	63rd Congress
2018	Hilda Patricia Ortega Nájera (Note: Jorge Salum del Palacio of the PAN was initially declared the winner in Durango's 4th, but Ortega Nájera successfully challenged the result before the electoral court.)	National Regeneration Movement	2018–2021	64th Congress
2021	Gina Campuzano González	National Action Party (Mexico)	2021–2024	65th Congress
2024	Silvia Patricia Jiménez Delgado	National Action Party (Mexico)	2024–2027	66th Congress

== Presidential elections ==
Durango's 4th district
Election	District won by	Party or coalition	%
2018	Andrés Manuel López Obrador	Juntos Haremos Historia	44.2670
2024	Claudia Sheinbaum Pardo	Sigamos Haciendo Historia	49.4164
