= Jorge Herrera Delgado =

Mexican politician

Chamber of Deputies LXII Legislature of the Mexican Congress
- In office 1 September 2012 – 24 November 2014
- Preceded by: Pedro Ávila Nevárez
- Succeeded by: Eduardo Solís Nogueira

Mayor of Durango
- In office 2004–2007
- Preceded by: José Rosas Aispuro
- Succeeded by: Jorge Herrera Caldera

Personal details
- Born: 16 August 1961 Durango, Durango, Mexico
- Died: 24 November 2014 (aged 53) Durango, Mexico
- Party: PRI
- Spouse: Blanca Estela Castro de Herrera
- Education: Durango Institute of Technology
- Occupation: Politician

Jorge Herrera Delgado (16 August 1961 – 24 November 2014) was a Mexican politician. A graduate in industrial engineering from the Durango Institute of Technology (ITD), he was a member of the Institutional Revolutionary Party. He founded the radio station XHITD-FM Estéreo Tecnológico in Durango. He was Mayor of Durango from 2004 to 2007 and a two-time deputy in the Durango state congress. He was designated by Governor Jorge Herrera Caldera to head the Durango Department of Education from 15 September 2010 to 7 February 2012.

He was elected to represent the fourth district of Durango in the LXII Legislature of the Mexican Congress (2012–2015). He belonged to following legislative commissions: Urban Development and Territorial Regulation (President), Treasury and Public Expenditure (Secretary), Public Education and Educative Service.

From 15 April, he was a delegate on the Executive National Committee of the PRI in Sonora.

Delgado died on 24 November 2014 from pancreatic cancer at the age of 53. He was replaced by his alternate deputy, Eduardo Solís Nogueira.

== Prizes ==
First Prize of Information Access in the category to Government Employees by Konrad-Adenaur Stiftung (KAS) Foundation and Libertad de Información, A. C. (LIMAC) in 2005.
