= José Manuel Díaz Medina =

Mexican politician

- Born: 2 July 1949 (age 76); Canatlán, Durango, Mexico
- Education: UJED
- Occupation: Politician
- Political party: PRI

José Manuel Díaz Medina (born 2 July 1949) is a Mexican politician from the Institutional Revolutionary Party (PRI). From 2000 to 2003 he served as a federal deputy in the 58th Congress, representing Durango's first district. He previously served in the Congress of Durango from 1998 to 2000.
