= 1st federal electoral district of Durango =

Federal electoral district of Mexico

Durango's 1st
- Electoral district of the Chamber of Deputies of Mexico

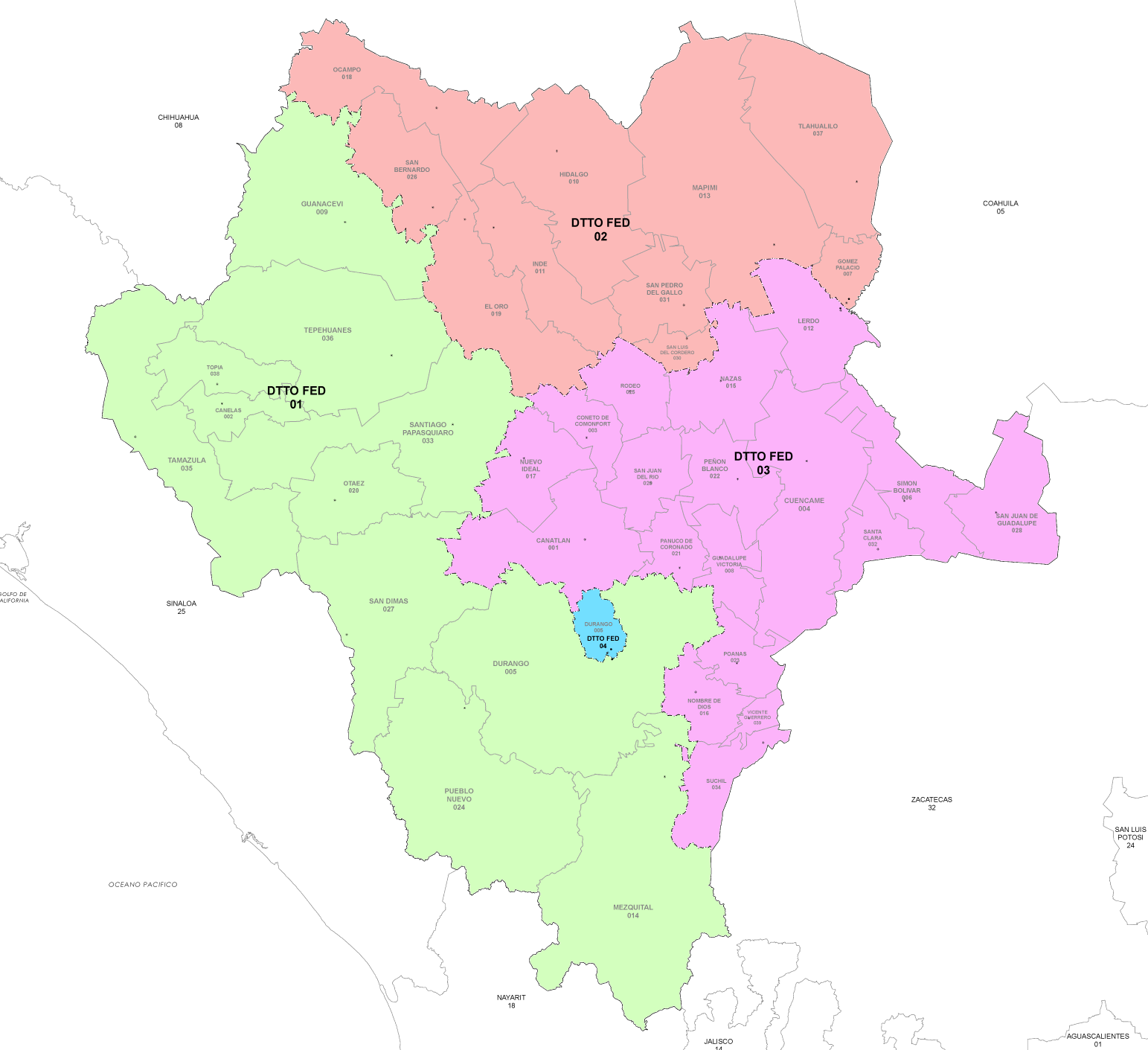
- 1st district since 2022

Incumbent
- Member: Martha Olivia García Vidaña
- Party: ▌Morena
- Congress: 66th (2024–2027)

District
- State: Durango
- Head town: Victoria de Durango
- Coordinates: 24°01′N 104°40′W
- Covers: 11 municipalities: Canelas, Durango (part), Guanaceví, Mezquital, Otáez, Pueblo Nuevo, San Dimas, Santiago Papasquiaro, Tamazula, Tepehuanes, Topia
- PR region: First
- Precincts: 395
- Population: 459,351 (2020 census)

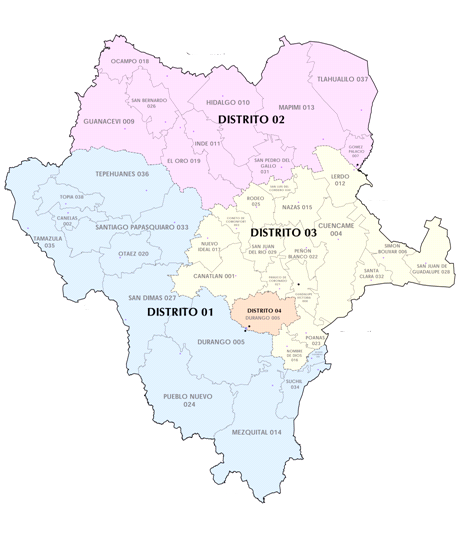
Durango under the 2017–2022 districting plan

The 1st federal electoral district of Durango (Spanish: Distrito electoral federal 01 de Durango) is one of the 300 electoral districts into which Mexico is divided for elections to the federal Chamber of Deputies and one of four such districts in the state of Durango.

It elects one deputy to the lower house of Congress for each three-year legislative session by means of the first-past-the-post system. Votes cast in the district also count towards the calculation of proportional representation ("plurinominal") deputies elected from the first region.

The current member for the district, elected in the 2024 general election, is Martha Olivia García Vidaña of the National Regeneration Movement (Morena).

== District territory ==
Under the 2023 districting plan adopted by the National Electoral Institute (INE), which is to be used for the 2024, 2027 and 2030 federal elections, the 1st district covers 395 electoral precincts (secciones electorales) across 11 municipalities in the west and south of the state:

- Durango (106 precincts in the municipality's rural west), (Note: The municipality of Durango is split with the 4th district.) Canelas, Guanaceví, Mezquital, Otáez, Pueblo Nuevo, San Dimas, Santiago Papasquiaro, Tamazula, Tepehuanes and Topia.

The head town (cabecera distrital), where results from individual polling stations are gathered together and tallied, is the state capital, Victoria de Durango. The district reported a population of 459,351 in the 2020 census.

== Previous districting schemes ==
Evolution of electoral district numbers
	1974	1978	1996	2005	2017	2023
Durango	4	6	5	4	4	4
Chamber of Deputies	196	300				

2017–2022

Between 2017 and 2022, the 1st district's head town was at Victoria de Durango and it covered 12 municipalities:
- Durango (100 precincts in the west), Canelas, Mezquital, Otáez, Pueblo Nuevo, San Dimas, Santiago Papasquiaro, Tamazula, Tepehuanes and Topia, as in the 2023 plan, but with Súchil and Vicente Guerrero replacing Guanaceví.

2005–2017

Under the 2005 plan, Durango's single-member district count fell from five to four. This district's head town was at Victoria de Durango and it covered 12 municipalities:
- Durango (92 precincts in the west), Canelas, Guanaceví, Mezquital, Otáez, Pueblo Nuevo, San Dimas, Santiago Papasquiaro, Súchil, Tamazula, Tepehuanes and Topia.

1996–2005

In the 1996 scheme, Durango's seats were reduced from six to five. The 1st district had its head town at Santiago Papasquiaro and it comprised 14 municipalities in the north and west of the state:
- Canatlán, Canelas, Guanaceví, Indé, Nuevo Ideal, Ocampo, El Oro, Otáez, San Bernardo, San Dimas, Santiago Papasquiaro, Tamazula, Tepehuanes and Topia.

1978–1996

The districting scheme in force from 1978 to 1996 was the result of the 1977 electoral reforms, which increased the number of single-member seats in the Chamber of Deputies from 196 to 300. Under that plan, Durango's seat allocation rose from four to six. The reconfigured 1st district's head town was at Victoria de Durango and it covered a part of that city.

== Deputies returned to Congress ==
(Mexico) National parties
- Current
- PAN
- PRI
- PT
- PVEM
- MC
- Morena
- PAZ
- Somos
- Defunct or local only
- PLM
- PNR
- PRM
- PNM
- PP
- PPS
- PARM
- PFCRN
- CON
- PANAL
- PSD
- PES
- PES
- PRD

Durango's 1st district
Election	Deputy	Party	Term	Legislature
1916	Silvestre Dorador		1916–1917	Constituent Congress of Querétaro
1917	Manuel Vargas		1917–1918	27th Congress
1918	José Ignacio Mena		1918–1920	28th Congress
1920	Ignacio Borrego		1920–1922	29th Congress
1922	Mariano Castillo Nájera		1922–1924	30th Congress
1924	Alejandro Antuna		1924–1926	31st Congress
1926	Silvestre Dorador		1926–1928	32nd Congress
1928	Francisco Pérez		1928–1930	33rd Congress
1930	José Ramón Valdés		1930–1932	34th Congress
1932	José Alejandro Albiztevi	Institutional Revolutionary Party	1932–1934	35th Congress
1934	Antonio Gutiérrez		1934–1937	36th Congress
1937	Alfredo Mena		1937–1940	37th Congress
1940	Enrique Carrola Antuna		1940–1943	38th Congress
1943	José Donaciano Sosa	Institutional Revolutionary Party	1943–1946	39th Congress
1946	José Guadalupe Bernal	Institutional Revolutionary Party	1946–1949	40th Congress
1949	Enrique Campos Luna	Institutional Revolutionary Party	1949–1952	41st Congress
1952	Máximo Gámiz Fernández; Jesús Cisneros Roldán	Institutional Revolutionary Party	1952–1954; 1954–1955	42nd Congress
1955	Carlos Real Encinas	Institutional Revolutionary Party	1955–1958	43rd Congress
1958	José Guillermo Salas Armendáriz	Institutional Revolutionary Party	1958–1961	44th Congress
1961	Oscar Valdés Flores; María Zataráin del Valle	Institutional Revolutionary Party	1961–1962; 1962–1964	45th Congress
1964	Ángel Rodríguez Solórzano	Institutional Revolutionary Party	1964–1967	46th Congress
1967	Agustín Ruíz Soto	Institutional Revolutionary Party	1967–1970	47th Congress
1970	Manuel Aguilera Tavizón	Institutional Revolutionary Party	1970–1973	48th Congress
1973	María Aurelia de la Cruz Espinoza	Institutional Revolutionary Party	1973–1976	49th Congress
1976	Ángel Sergio Guerrero Mier	Institutional Revolutionary Party	1976–1979	50th Congress
1979	Luis Ángel Tejada Espino	Institutional Revolutionary Party	1979–1982	51st Congress
1982	Zina Ruiz de León	Institutional Revolutionary Party	1982–1985	52nd Congress
1985	Joel Rosas Torres	National Action Party (Mexico)	1985–1988	53rd Congress
1988	Joaquín Garduño Vargas	Institutional Revolutionary Party	1988–1991	54th Congress
1991	Armando Sergio González Santacruz	Institutional Revolutionary Party	1991–1994	55th Congress
1994	Ismael Hernández Deras	Institutional Revolutionary Party	1994–1997	56th Congress
1997	Juan Manuel Félix León	Institutional Revolutionary Party	1997–2000	57th Congress
2000	José Manuel Díaz Medina	Institutional Revolutionary Party	2000–2003	58th Congress
2003	Francisco Monárrez	Institutional Revolutionary Party	2003–2006	59th Congress
2006	Luis Enrique Benítez Ojeda	Institutional Revolutionary Party	2006–2009	60th Congress
2009	Ricardo López Pescador	Institutional Revolutionary Party	2009–2012	61st Congress
2012	Sonia Catalina Mercado Gallegos	Institutional Revolutionary Party	2012–2015	62nd Congress
2015	Otniel García Navarro (Note: On 13 February 2018, García Navarro resigned as a member of the PRI's congressional group and aligned himself with Morena.)	Institutional Revolutionary Party National Regeneration Movement	2015–2018	63rd Congress
2018	Martha Olivia García Vidaña	National Regeneration Movement	2018–2021	64th Congress
2021	Francisco Castrellón Garza	National Action Party (Mexico)	2021–2024	65th Congress
2024	Martha Olivia García Vidaña	National Regeneration Movement	2024–2027	66th Congress

== Presidential elections ==
Durango's 1st district
Election	District won by	Party or coalition	%
2018	Andrés Manuel López Obrador	Juntos Haremos Historia	41.4673
2024	Claudia Sheinbaum Pardo	Sigamos Haciendo Historia	58.2177
