= Peschard (surname) =

Origin
- Language: Proto-Indo-European
- Origin: "peysḱ-"
- Meaning: "fish"

Peschard is a surname. The root "pesch-" derives from the Latin "piscis," which itself comes from the Proto-Indo-European "peysḱ-" meaning fish. The name is concentrated most heavily in France, Mexico, and the United States.

== Academics ==
- Alejandro Peschard Fernández, Mexican archaeologist
- Armand Peschard-Sverdrup, Mexican political scientist
- Guillermo Peschard, Mexican academic
- Jacqueline Peschard, Mexican sociologist

== Architects ==
- Beatriz Peschard, Mexican architect
- Eugenio Peschard, Mexican architect

== Artists ==
- Albert Peschard, French organist
- Auguste Jacques Étienne Peschard, French tenor
- Jean Peschard, French painter

== Politicians ==
- Jean-Jacques Peschard, French politician

== Revolutionaries ==
- Raymonde Peschard, Algerian freedom fighter
