= 5th federal electoral district of Durango =

Defunct federal electoral district of Mexico

Coordinates: 24°01′N 104°40′W

The 5th federal electoral district of Durango (Spanish: Distrito electoral federal 05 de Durango) was a federal electoral district of Mexico. During its most recent existence, from 1977 to 2006, it returned one deputy to the Chamber of Deputies for each three-year legislative session by means of the first-past-the-post system. Votes cast in the district also counted towards the calculation of proportional representation ("plurinominal") deputies elected from the country's electoral regions.

Suspended in 1930, (Note: An amendment to Article 52 of the Constitution in 1928 changed the original provision of "one deputy per 60,000 inhabitants" to "one deputy per 100,000"; as a result, the size of the Chamber of Deputies fell from 281 in the 1928 election to 171 in 1934.) Durango's 5th district was re-established as part of the 1977 electoral reforms, which increased the number of single-member seats in the Chamber of Deputies from 196 to 300. Under the reforms, Durango's seat allocation rose from four to six. It was dissolved by the Federal Electoral Institute (IFE) in 2005, when the state's population no longer warranted five districts. Thus, the re-established 5th district was first contested in the 1979 mid-term election and elected its last deputy in the 2003 mid-terms.

== District territory ==
Evolution of electoral district numbers
	1974	1978	1996	2005	2017	2023
Durango	4	6	5	4	4	4
Chamber of Deputies	196	300				

1996–2005

In the 1996 scheme, under which Durango had five single-member seats, the 5th district's head town (Spanish: cabecera distrital), where results from individual polling stations were gathered together and tallied, was the state capital, Victoria de Durango, and it comprised 199 precincts in the south of the municipality of Durango.

1978–1996

The restored 5th district comprised the southern half of the municipality of Durango, including a part of the state capital, together with the municipalities of Mezquital, Nombre de Dios, Pueblo Nuevo, San Dimas, Súchil and Vicente Guerrero. The state capital served as its head town.

== Deputies returned to Congress ==
(Mexico) National parties
- Current
- PAN
- PRI
- PT
- PVEM
- MC
- Morena
- PAZ
- Somos
- Defunct or local only
- PLM
- PNR
- PRM
- PNM
- PP
- PPS
- PARM
- PFCRN
- CON
- PANAL
- PSD
- PES
- PES
- PRD

Durango's 5th district
Election	Deputy	Party	Term	Legislature
1916	Fernando Gómez Palacio		1916–1917	Constituent Congress of Querétaro
...
The fifth district was suspended between 1930 and 1977
1979	Gonzalo Salas Rodríguez	Institutional Revolutionary Party	1979–1982	51st Congress
1982	Juan Arizmendi Hernández	Institutional Revolutionary Party	1982–1985	52nd Congress
1985	Ángel Sergio Guerrero Mier	Institutional Revolutionary Party	1985–1988	53rd Congress
1988	Leodegario Soto Cesaretti	Institutional Revolutionary Party	1988–1991	54th Congress
1991	Gabriela Irma Avelar Villegas	Institutional Revolutionary Party	1991–1994	55th Congress
1994	José Roberto Arreola Arreola	Institutional Revolutionary Party	1994–1997	56th Congress
1997	Alejandro González Yáñez (Note: González Yáñez resigned his seat in March 1998 to contend (unsuccessfully) for the governorship of Durango. He was replaced by his substitute, Pedro Cortés.); Santiago Pedro Cortés	Labour Party (Mexico)	1997–1998; 1998–2000	57th Congress
2000	Rodolfo Dorador Pérez Gavilán	National Action Party (Mexico)	2000–2003	58th Congress
2003	Pedro Ávila Nevárez	Institutional Revolutionary Party	2003–2006	59th Congress
