= Gina Campuzano González =

Mexican politician (born 1963)

Senator for Durango
- Incumbent
- Assumed office 1 September 2024

Federal deputy for Durango's 4th
- In office 1 September 2021 – 31 August 2024

Personal details
- Born: 16 October 1965 (age 60) Victoria de Durango, Durango, Mexico
- Party: PAN
- Education: UTM
- Occupation: Lawyer, politician

Gina Gerardina Campuzano González (Note: In this Spanish name, the first or paternal surname is Campuzano and the second or maternal family name is González.) (born 16 October 1965) is a Mexican politician from the National Action Party (PAN). She has represented her party and her home state, Durango, in both chambers of Congress.

== Biography ==
Gina Campuzano González was born in Victoria de Durango, capital of the state of Durango, in 1965. She holds a degree in law from TecMilenio University.

She has served two terms in the Congress of Durango (2010–2013 and 2016–2018) and two terms as a municipal councillor (regidora) in the municipality of Durango. She was later elected to the federal Chamber of Deputies for Durango's 4th district in the 2021 mid-terms, where she served during the 65th session of Congress and was a member of the friendship groups with New Zealand (chair), the Russian Federation, and Angola. She resigned her seat on 29 February 2024 and was replaced for the remainder of her term by her alternate, María Elena González Rivera.

Campuzano González contended for one of Durango's Senate seats in the 2024 general election, occupying the first position on the two-name formula of the Fuerza y Corazón por México coalition, in which the PAN allied itself with the Institutional Revolutionary Party (PRI) and the Party of the Democratic Revolution (PRD). With her coalition placing second in the state behind the Morena-led Sigamos Haciendo Historia alliance, she was duly elected to Durango's third Senate seat for the 66th and 67th congressional sessions (2024–2030). In the Senate, she is the secretary of the committee for the environment, natural resources and climate change and is a member of the committees for livestock, urban districting and housing, foreign affairs (Africa), and water resources and infrastructure.
