= Tamazula =

Tamazula may refer to several locations in Mexico:

- Tamazula Municipality, Durango
  - Tamazula de Victoria, the seat of Tamazula Municipality
- Tamazula de Gordiano, Jalisco
- Tamazula, a village in Guasave, Sinaloa
- Tamazula River, in Sinaloa and Durango

== See also ==
- Salsa Tamazula, Guadalajara, Mexico-based manufacturer of Valentina hot sauce
