= Esteban Villegas =

Mexican politician

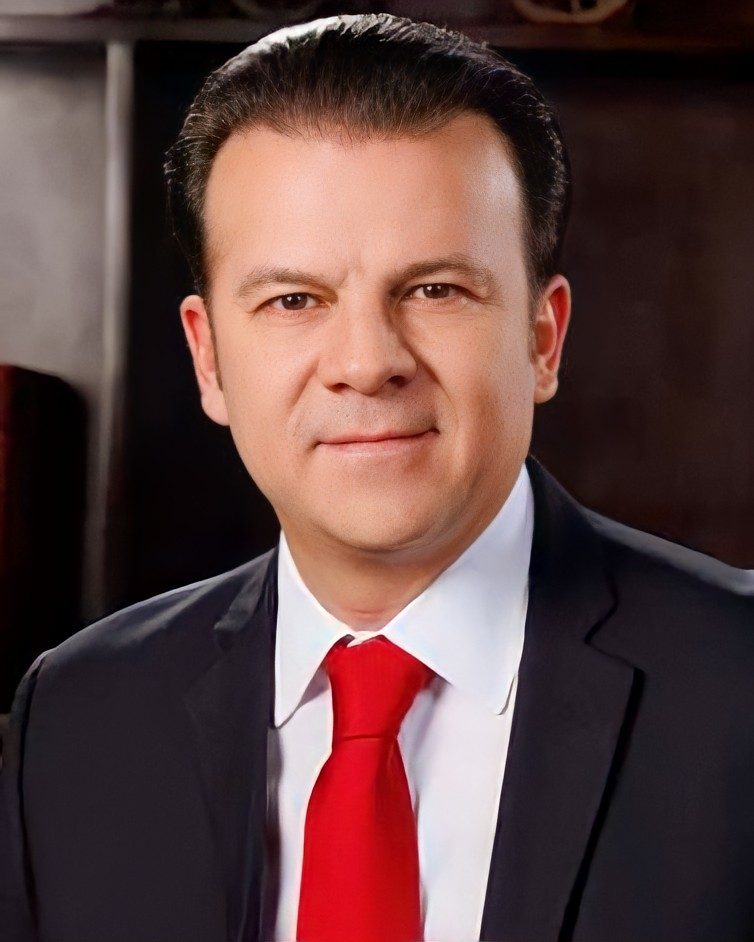

Governor of Durango
- Incumbent
- Assumed office 15 September 2022
- Preceded by: José Rosas Aispuro

Personal details
- Born: Esteban Villegas Villarreal; 22 February 1976 (age 50) San Juan del Río, Durango, Mexico
- Party: Institutional Revolutionary Party
- Spouse: Marisol Rosso
- Occupation: Politician, surgeon and singer

Esteban Villegas Villarreal (born 22 February 1976) is a Mexican surgeon, singer and politician affiliated with the Institutional Revolutionary Party (PRI) and the current Governor of Durango. He previously served as the mayor of the state capital, Victoria de Durango, as the health secretary of the state, and as a deputy in the state congress. As a singer, he is a member of the Regional Mexican music duo Esteban y Lauro.
