= Ricardo López =

Ricardo López may refer to:

- Ricardo López Aranda (1934–1996), Spanish playwright
- Ricardo López (boxer) (born 1966), Mexican boxer
- Ricardo López Cepero (born c. 1978), Puerto Rican politician and former mayor of Culebra
- Ricardo López Felipe (born 1971), Spanish football player
- Ricardo López Jordán (1822–1889), Argentine soldier and politician
- Ricardo López Méndez (1903–1989), Mexican poet and lyricist
- Ricardo López Murphy (born 1951), Argentine economist and politician
- Ricardo López Pescador (born 1954), Mexican politician
- Ricardo López (politician) (born 1937), Spanish-born Canadian politician
- Ricardo López (stalker) (1975–1996), Uruguayan-born American stalker of musician Björk
- Ricardo López Tenorio (born 1947), Salvadoran football coach
- Ricardo López Tugendhat (born 1977), Ecuadorian sport shooter

== See also ==
- Ricardo Lopes (disambiguation)
