= Jaime Fernandez =

Jaime Fernandez may refer to:

- Jaime Fernández Saracho (born 1957), Mexican politician
- Jaime Fernández (actor) (1927–2005), Mexican actor
- Jaime Fernández (basketball) (born 1993), Spanish basketball player
- Jaime Fernandez (rower) (born 1971), Australian rower
- Jaime Fernández (swimmer) (born 1968), Spanish swimmer
- Jaime David Fernández Mirabal, Dominican psychiatrist, agronomist, and politician
