= Concealing objects in a book =

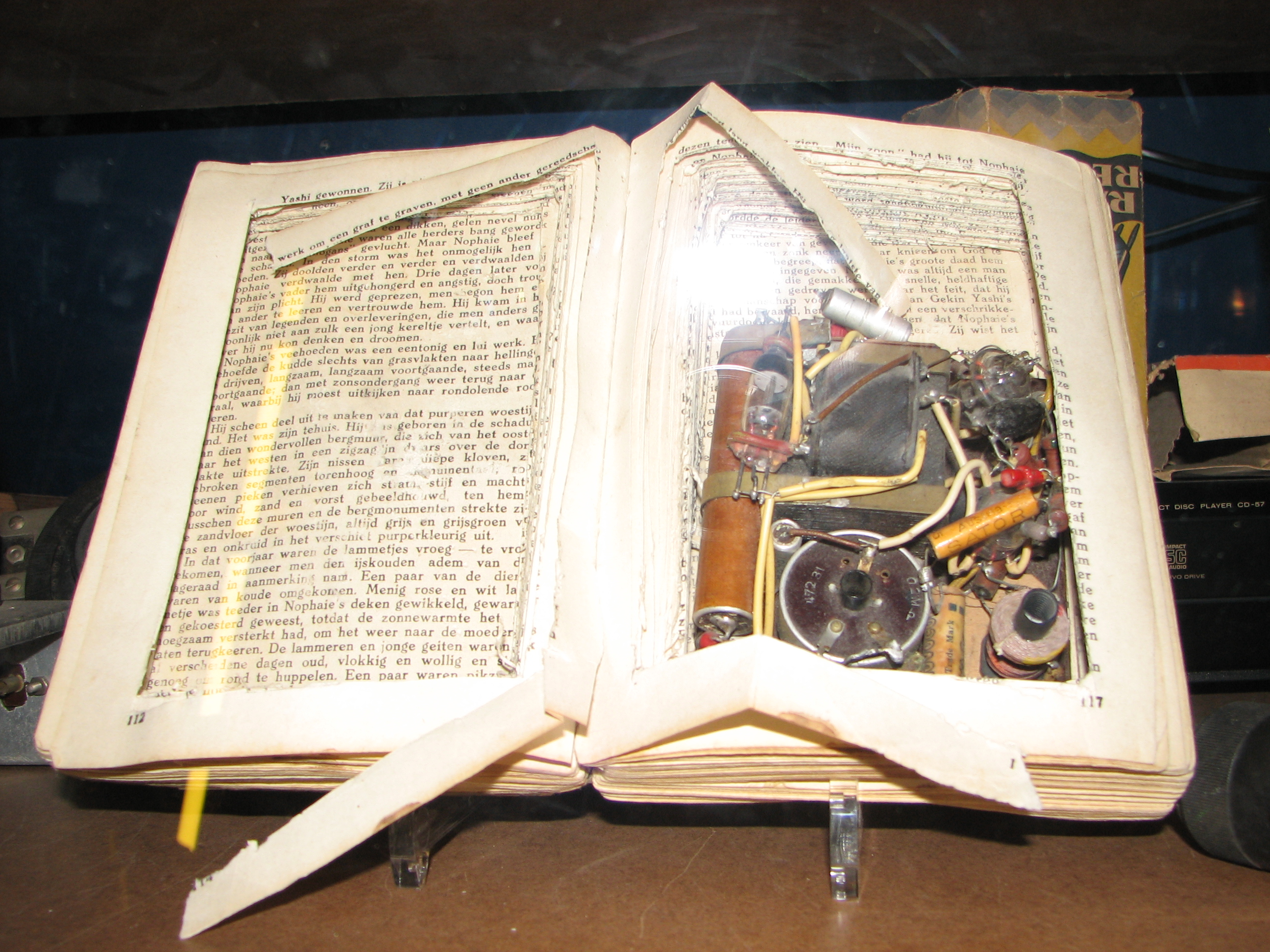
A radio hidden in a book

There are many real and fictitious occurrences of concealing objects in a book. Items can be concealed in books in a number of ways. Small items such as a photograph or a note can be hidden in between the pages of the book. Thicker items can be hidden by removing the interior portion of some or all of the pages, creating a book safe or hollowed-out book. Book safes are easy for their owners to recognise, but they do not stand out to a thief or other intruder.

Another type of concealment is the hiding of messages in the text or on a book's pages by printing in code – a form of steganography. For example, letters could be underlined on sequential pages, with the letters spelling out a message or code. There are a number of actual and fictional examples of items or messages having been concealed in a book.

Illicit chemicals may be smuggled by soaking individual pages with them.

Books are used as a concealment device in part because they are readily available and inconspicuous in many settings.

== Methods of concealment ==
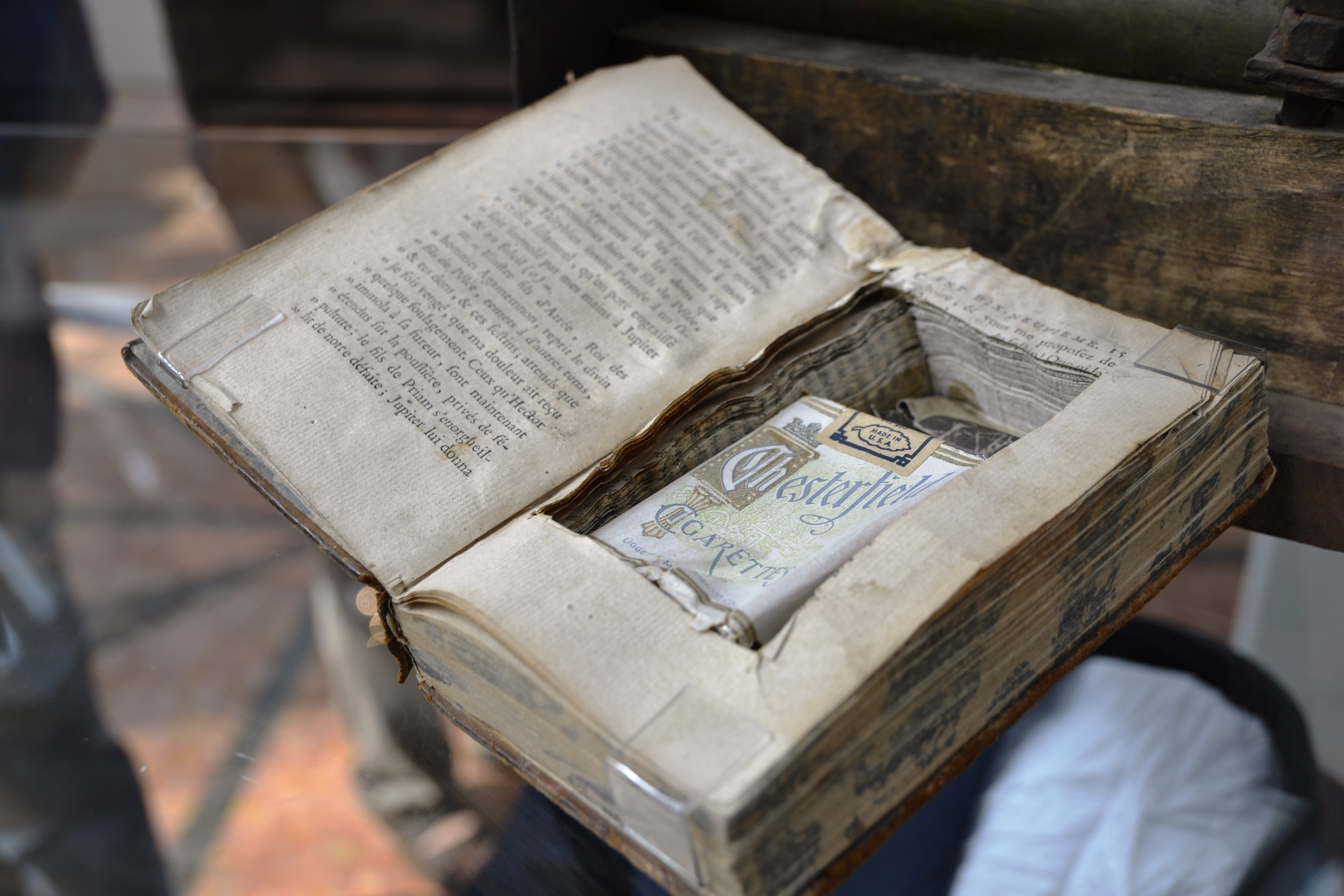
A pack of cigarettes hidden inside a book

=== Hollow book safes ===
Book safes (also known as dummy books or faux books) are designed to imitate a real book by appearance to deceive people, some books may be whole with empty pages, others may be hollow or in other cases, there may be a whole panel carved with spines which are then painted to look like books, titles of some books may also be fictitious.

Prices can vary based on the cost of materials, additional features, and resources used to create the functionality and aesthetics of the hollow book. The main functional purpose aims for the containment of valuables, memorable items, or contraband within the cloak of an ordinary book. Thus maintaining privacy and security from unwanted intrusions and/or theft.

The scale of gadgetry used to create the seal of a hollow book's closing properties have ranged from simple to complex. Simple elastic bands, interlocking rope, and other common book closing techniques are used. Other times, hidden magnets do the task as well as the unusual use of complex locking mechanisms that require a lock and key combinations have also been used to keep a book closed.

Material choices used in the creation of the hollow book's body are usually actual books. However, other plastic, metal, cardboard, or paper materials have also been used to either simulate a real book, or to be used as extra features.

Many book safes are handmade. Structures made from real books are sealed and pressed before hollowing the inside pages with a sharp cutting utility. Sealing the back and allowing the front cover to act as a door that can be opened and shut. While other hollow books are made from cardboard cigar boxes, simulating a book on the outside.

There are many reasons to have dummy books on display such as; to allude visitors of the vast wealth of information in their possession and to inflate the owner's appearance of wealth, to conceal something, for shop displays or for decorative purposes.

== Choice of book ==
In fictional uses of book safes, the title or subject of the book can be symbolic or related to the nature of the object, e.g., hidden money in a copy of The Wealth of Nations. There are a number of cases from films and television series where an item is hidden in the Bible.

In early 19th century at Gwrych Castle, North Wales, Lloyd Hesketh Bamford-Hesketh was known for his vast collection of books at his library, however, at the later part of that same century, the public became aware that parts of his library was a fabrication, dummy books were built and then locked behind glass doors to stop people from trying to access them, from this a proverb was born, "Like Hesky's library, all outside".

== Actual or purported examples ==
=== Objects ===
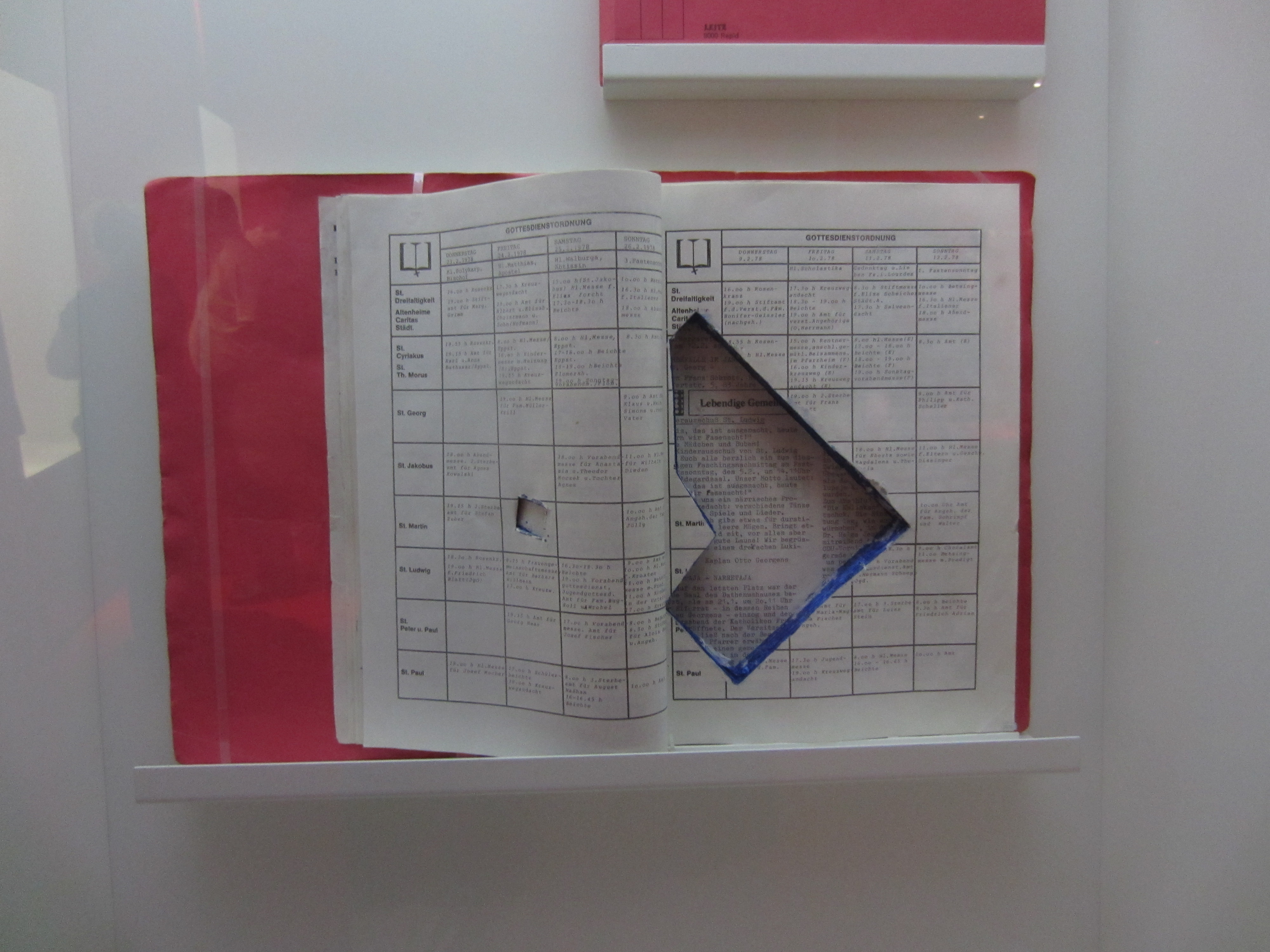
Visual aid showing how a book could be modified to conceal a pistol from a museum exhibit about the Red Army Faction

- Recording artist Ugly Husbands released a full-length cassette in a limited edition of 50, each in a different book-safe, on Roll Over Rover Records.
- Hollowed-out books have been used to smuggle items into prisons, such as tools to aid a prison escape or contraband such as drugs or weapons.
- Small bombs can be hidden inside books, with a trigger that operates when book is opened. In 1980, United Airlines president Percy Wood was injured by the explosion of a pipe bomb hidden inside a book that he received in the mail.
- A man in Redding, California was arrested after taking photographs of a young girl with a camera hidden inside a book.
- In 2005, antiques thieves attempted to use a hollowed-out book to take a precious lead weight out of Israel.
- Guards at the Washington County Jail in Fayetteville, Arkansas seized a book that had been marked with what appeared to be stains from a leaking yellow felt pen, but tested positive for methamphetamine.
- Ilya Lichtenstein and Heather Morgan used two hollowed-out books to conceal items in their attempts to launder $4.5 billion in stolen cryptocurrency in 2019.
- In 1996, Ricardo Lopez fabricated a hollowed-out book to house a sophisticated acid dispersal device, designed to look inconspicuous and infiltrate the postal system to injure Björk. The package was intercepted at a post office in London by the Metropolitan Police after the famous Ricardo Lopez tapes were discovered by the Hollywood Police Department.

== Fictional occurrences ==
=== Television ===
- In the series Blackadder the Third, the opening titles feature Edmund Blackadder Esq. removing a romance novel (featuring the titles of the episode and accompanying cover art) from a hollowed-out book featuring the title Blackadder the Third.
- In the series Prison Break, the main character, Michael Scofield, hides a screw in a Bible, which he uses to break out of prison.
- In the Lost episode "What Kate Did", one of the characters finds some film in a Bible.
- In The Simpsons episode "Co-Dependents' Day", Homer conceals alcohol in a Bible whilst visiting Marge in rehab, having framed her in a drunk-driving incident to avoid another DUI. He later discovers, to his horror and after promising to cut down on his drinking, that his hollowed-out Bible has been replaced with an intact copy.
- In the House episode "Finding Judas", the title character conceals a bottle of Vicodin in a textbook on lupus.
- In the King of the Hill episode "Full Metal Dust Jacket," Dale Gribble attempts to buy a book for the purpose of hiding a firearm in it.
- In the series Pretty Little Liars, character, Spencer Hastings, finds four small tapes concealed in a book.

=== Film ===
- Red Grant, one of the villains in the 1963 James Bond film From Russia with Love has a gun hidden in a copy of War and Peace.
- A nail trimmer is concealed in a Bible by inmate Frank Morris in the 1979 film Escape from Alcatraz.
- In the BBC mini-series Smiley's People, George Smiley hides a negative photograph of Kirov and Leipzig in an antique edition on loan from a friend upon Oliver Lacon's intrusion into his study. When Lacon's interest in the book becomes untenable, Smiley remarks that the edition is worth half the national budget and could he leave it alone—thus preserving the cover for the interleaved exposure.
- In the 1993 Disney film The Three Musketeers, Aramis pulls a pistol from a hollowed out bible to save d'Artagnan from the executioners' axe.
- In the 1994 film The Shawshank Redemption, one of the characters hides a rock hammer inside a Bible. The first page to be cut into bears the title "Exodus". The line "Salvation lies within" is also repeated more than once.
- In the 1997 Disney film Jungle 2 Jungle, an item is hidden in the Bible.
- In the 1997 film The Game, Nicholas takes a gun from a hollowed-out copy of To Kill a Mockingbird.
- In the 1999 film The Matrix, Neo hides several computer disks in a copy of Jean Baudrillard's Simulacra and Simulation.
- In the 1999 short film Me and the Big Guy, Citizen 43275-B hides a handwritten 'Guide to Revolution', pen, and pair of glasses in a Re-Education Manual, having intentionally irritated Big Brother to the extent that he no longer wants to surveil him in order to continue writing it in private.
- In the 2001 film Lara Croft: Tomb Raider, Lara Croft finds a hidden note from her father bound behind a book jacket.
- In the 2004 film Harold & Kumar Go to White Castle, Kumar hides his stash of marijuana in his medical book.
- In the 2004 film National Treasure, Benjamin Gates's father keeps money in a copy of Common Sense.
- In the 2006 film V for Vendetta, Bishop Anthony James Lilliman hides a gun in a copy of the Bible.
- In the 2007 film The Invisible, the protagonist hides money he has earned selling essays in a hollowed-out copy of Catch-22.
- In the 2019 film John Wick: Chapter 3 – Parabellum, the titular character retrieves a cache of items hidden in a hollowed-out copy of Alexander Afanasyev's collection of Russian folk tales in the New York Public Library.
- In the 2019 film El Camino: A Breaking Bad Movie, Todd Alquist initially hides money he earned from manufacturing meth in hollowed-out encyclopedias. After his cleaner uncovers this system, Alquist kills her and begins hiding money in his fridge.

=== Fiction writing ===
- Explorers on the Moon, one of The Adventures of Tintin, features a book hollowed out to hold alcohol.
- In Robert Ludlum's book The Janson Directive, Paul Janson's old mentor Angus Fielding, don of Trinity College, pulls a .22 Webley Pistol out of the 1759 edition of Samuel Johnson's A Dictionary of the English Language A-G (the A standing for ammunition and the G for guns).
- In the novel Interstellar Pig, Barney hides the Piggy in a hollowed-out high-school yearbook.
- In the manga series Cardcaptor Sakura and Cardcaptor Sakura: Clear Card, the Clow/Sakura Book is a book safe containing the magical cards of Clow Reed and Sakura Kinomoto.
- In the novel John Dies at the End, David keeps a gun in a hollowed-out copy of the Qur'an.
- In the novel The Testaments by Margaret Atwood, Lydia uses a hollowed-out copy of Apologia Pro Vita Sua to hide an illicit manuscript that will later be known as the Ardua Hall Holograph. In the manuscript, Lydia details her induction as a Founding Aunt of Gilead, the endemic corruption and hypocrisy of the Commanders of the Faith, and her covert efforts to deliver justice within the Gileadian system and assist the Mayday Resistance.

=== Games ===
- In the 2001 adventure game Alfred Hitchcock Presents: The Final Cut, the player must cut open a book with a knife to discover a key.
- In the horror game Resident Evil, players can obtain a book with a medal hidden inside.
- In the video game Hitman: Blood Money, the player can conceal a bomb in a hollow Bible.
- In the Nintendo DS game Another Code, a key is found inside a hollow book.
- In the PC and NES game Shadowgate, a key is found in a hollowed out book. The player must learn to open the book without removing it to avoid triggering a trap that will drop them into a pit.

== Related concepts ==
- Often in popular fiction, a switch to open a secret passage is disguised as a book on a bookshelf.

== See also ==
- Altered book
- Art diary
- Artist's book
- Miniature book
- Origami
- Pamphlet
- Paper craft
- Paper fortune teller
- Paper plane
- Pop-up book
- Visual poetry
- Volvelle
- Zine
