= Ismael Hernández =

Mexican politician

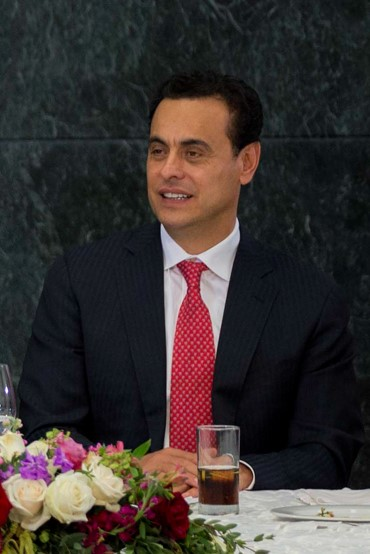
Hernández Deras as a senator in 2017

Ismael Alfredo Hernández Deras (Note: In this Mexican name, the surname is Hernández and the second or maternal family name is Deras.) (born 20 February 1964) is a Mexican politician affiliated with the Institutional Revolutionary Party (PRI) who served as Governor of the State of Durango from 15 September 2004 to 14 September 2010. Hernández previously served as municipal president (mayor) and as a senator.

Born in the state capital Victoria de Durango, he studied at the city's Escuela Secundaria Ignacio Manuel Altamirano (ESIMA). He received an accounting degree from the Universidad Juárez del Estado de Durango, where he was a student leader. From 1989 until 1992, he was president of the Revolutionary Youth Front in Durango. From 1992 to 1994, he was a member of the Congress of Durango and state president of the PRI.

In the 1994 general election, he was elected to the Chamber of Deputies for Durango's 1st district. From 1995 until 1998, he was Secretary General of the "Confederación Nacional de Organizaciones Populares en Durango" and was an alternate senator between 1997 and 2000.

He was elected mayor of Durango in 1998. In 2000, he was elected senator. In 2003, he was elected governor of the state of Durango. He ended his tenure when he became governor of the state on 15 September 2004, until 2010.

Hernández Deras was elected to the Senate in the 2012 general election.

== Notes ==
Preceded by Ángel Sergio Guerrero	Governor of Durango; 2004–2010	Succeeded by Jorge Herrera Caldera
