= Sonia Catalina Mercado =

Mexican politician (born 1968)

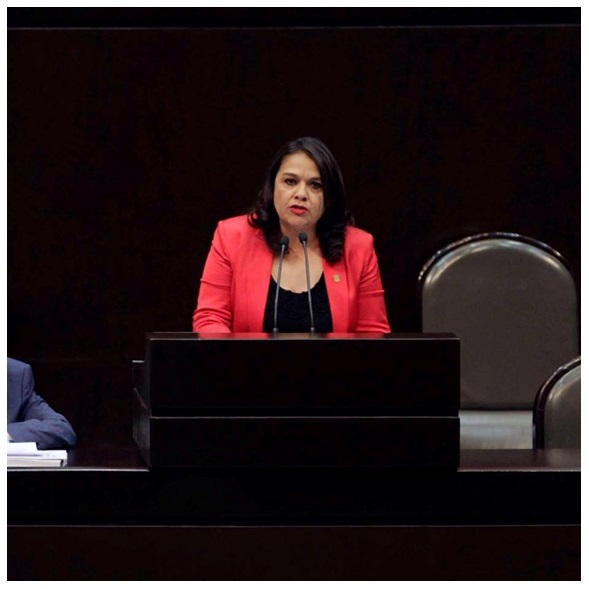
- Born: 23 October 1968 (age 57); Durango, Durango, Mexico
- Education: UJED
- Occupation: Deputy
- Political party: PRI

Sonia Catalina Mercado Gallegos (born 23 October 1968) is a Mexican politician affiliated with the Institutional Revolutionary Party (PRI). In the 2012 general election she was elected to the Chamber of Deputies to represent the first district of Durango during the 62nd Congress.
