= Saracho =

Saracho is a surname. Notable people with the surname include:

- Florencia del Saracho (born 1981), Mexican actress
- Francisco Saracho Navarro (born 1963), Mexican politician
- Jaime Fernández Saracho (born 1957), Mexican politician
- Tanya Saracho, Mexican-American playwright and television writer
