= Luis Enrique Benítez Ojeda =

Mexican politician

- Born: 20 October 1969 (age 56); Victoria de Durango, Durango, Mexico
- Occupation: Politician
- Political party: PRI

Luis Enrique Benítez Ojeda (born 20 October 1969) is a Mexican politician affiliated with the Institutional Revolutionary Party (PRI). In 2006–2009 he served as a federal deputy in the 60th Congress, representing Durango's first district.
