= Maximiliano Silerio Esparza =

Mexican politician (born 1939)

Maximiliano Silerio Esparza (born 14 March 1939) is a Mexican politician, a member of the Institutional Revolutionary Party (PRI) and a former Governor of Durango (1992–1998).

== Biography ==
Maximiliano Silerio was elected to the Chamber of Deputies in the 1976 general election, representing Durango's 2nd district, and again in the 1982 general election, for Durango's 4th district.

He was later elected to the Senate for Durango for the period 1988 to 1994, but resigned the position in 1992 to accept the nomination as the PRI's gubernatorial candidate for the 1992–1998 term.

During his period as governor, he maintained a bordering conflict with the state of Zacatecas because of a land claim on the part of Tepehuanos natives.

In addition he has carried out numerous positions like Delegate of his party in various states of the republic.

== See also ==
- Governor of Durango

Preceded by José Ramírez Gamero	Governor of Durango; 1992–1998	Succeeded by Ángel Sergio Guerrero
