= José Rosas Aispuro =

Governor of Durango, Mexico

José Rosas Aispuro Torres
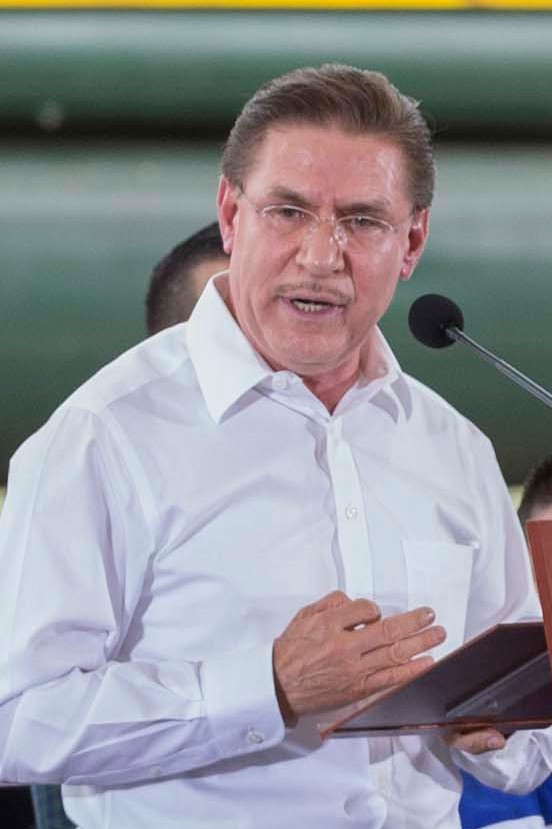

Governor of Durango
- In office 15 September 2016 – 14 September 2022
- Preceded by: Jorge Herrera Caldera
- Succeeded by: Esteban Villegas Villarreal

Personal details
- Born: October 19, 1961 (age 64) Tamazula, Durango, Mexico
- Party: PAN
- Education: Autonomous University of Sinaloa (LLB, PhD)
- Occupation: Politician

José Rosas Aispuro Torres (born 19 October 1961) is a Mexican lawyer and politician affiliated with the National Action Party (PAN) who served as the governor of Durango from 2016 to 2022. From 2012 to 2015, he served as senator in the 62nd and 63rd Congresses representing Durango. He also was Municipal President of Durango, Durango, from 2001 to 2004.

He was member of the Chamber of Deputies in the 56th (for Durango's 3rd district) and 60th Congresses (as a plurinominal deputy), when he was affiliated with the Institutional Revolutionary Party (PRI).

== Life ==
Aispuro Torres was born on 19 October 1961, in Tamazula, Durango. He became a member of the PRI in 1980 and began pursuing his bachelor's degree in law from the Universidad Autónoma de Sinaloa in 1981. After also obtaining his doctorate in law, he served in the Durango state government and the PRI before his first tour as a federal legislator. He was a deputy in the 56th Congress, where he sat on the Human Rights, Youth Matters, and Legislative Investigations commissions. In 1995, Aispuro became the president of the PRI in Durango.

From 1998 to 2001, Aispuro was a local deputy in the 61st session of the Congress of Durango. In 1999, he also became a professor of law, chairing the graduate studies division of the law school at the Universidad Juárez del Estado de Durango.

For Aispuro, much of the early 2000s was spent in municipal affairs. He was the municipal president of Victoria de Durango between 2001 and 2004; twice in that period, he was the president of the National Conference of Municipalities of Mexico, and he also presided over the National Federation of Municipalities for a year. During this time, he was considered for a PRI candidacy to the governorship of Durango and wrote two books: Digesto Constitucional Mexicano: las constituciones de Durango (2001), on the evolution of Durango's state constitutions, and El municipio en Iberoamérica (2003), on municipal matters. From 2005 to 2006, Aispuro served as the director general of the Durango state pension system.

While he was originally considered to run for Senate from the PRI, in 2006 Aispuro became a federal deputy in the 60th Congress. In his second tour in San Lázaro, he was the secretary of the Commission for the Strengthening of Federalism and served on the Finance and Public Credit and Education Commissions, as well as a committee devoted to gender equality.

In 2010, Aispuro left the PRI and was immediately put forth as a gubernatorial candidate by a coalition of the PAN, PRD, PT and Convergencia. He lost by 11,000 votes to the PRI candidate, Jorge Herrera Caldera.

Two years later, the PAN ran Aispuro for the Senate, and he served for three years, opting to resign on 15 December 2015, in order to run for governor of Durango. He was replaced by Héctor David Flores Ávalos. On 4 February 2016, a PAN-PRD alliance nominated Aispuro for governor, and he won the elections on 5 June 2016; rapid counts showed him winning with 46 percent of the vote.

When Aispuro took office on 1 September 2016, he became the first governor of Durango to come from a party other than the PRI.
