= Francisco Monárrez Rincón =

Mexican politician

- Born: 5 August 1950 (age 75); Santa María del Oro, Durango, Mexico
- Occupation: Politician
- Political party: PRI

Francisco Luis Monárrez Rincón (born 5 August 1950) is a Mexican politician affiliated with the Institutional Revolutionary Party (PRI). In the 2003 mid-terms he was elected to the Chamber of Deputies to represent the first district of Durango during the 59th Congress.
