= Pedro Ávila Nevárez =

Mexican politician (1937–2020)

- Born: 12 March 1937; Victoria de Durango, Durango, Mexico
- Died: 22 November 2020 (aged 83); Victoria de Durango, Durango, Mexico
- Occupation: Politician
- Political party: PRI

Pedro Ávila Nevárez (12 March 1937 – 22 November 2020) was a Mexican politician affiliated with the Institutional Revolutionary Party (PRI).

He served in the Chamber of Deputies on two occasions: in 2003–06, for Durango's 5th district, and again in 2010–12, as the substitute of Jorge Herrera Caldera, for Durango's 4th district.

Ávila Nevárez died on 22 November 2020, in Victoria de Durango, from COVID-19 complications.
