= Eugenio Peschard =

Mexican architect

Eugenio Peschard Delgado
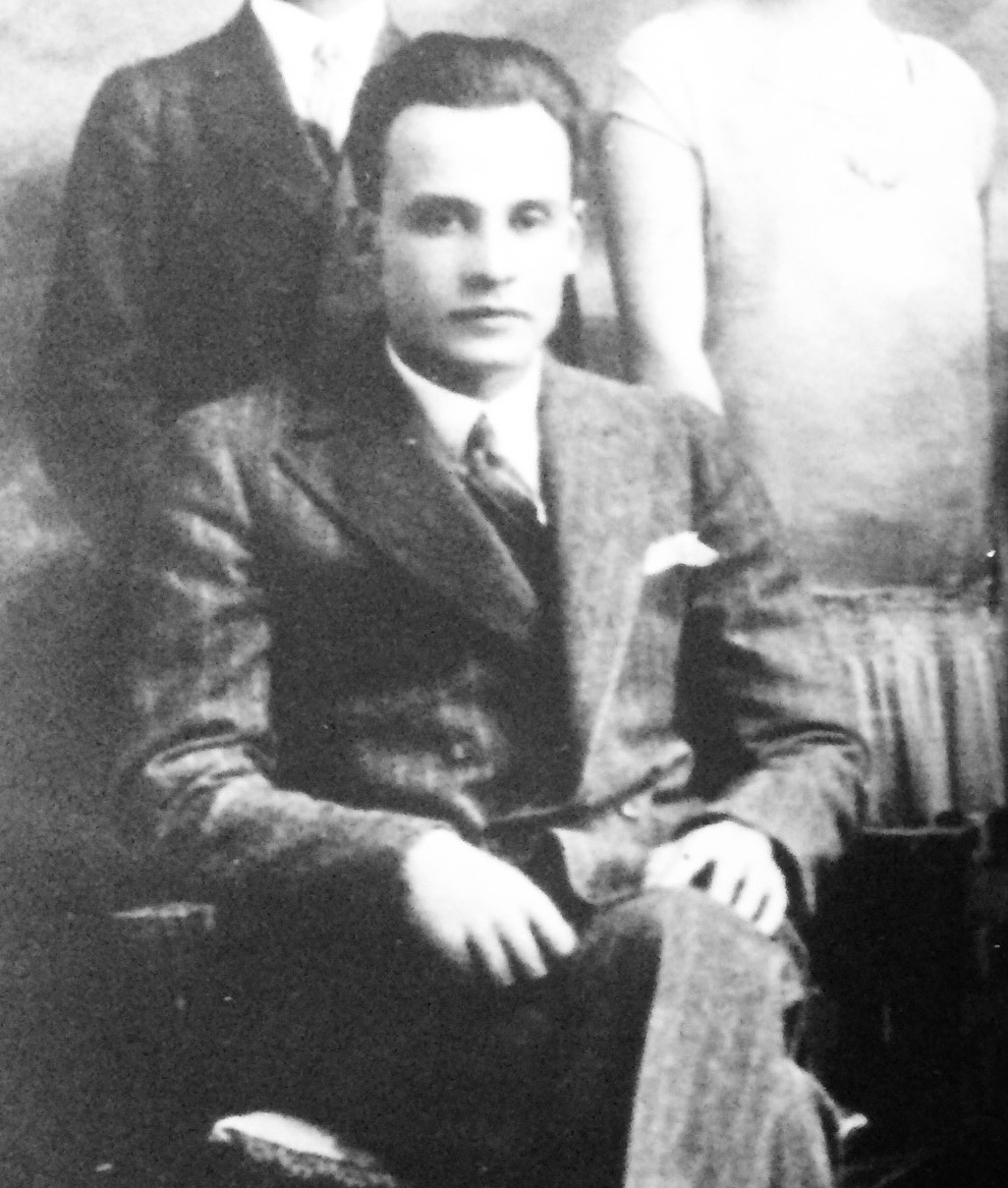
- Born: Durango, Durango, Mexico
- Died: Mexico City, Mexico
- Occupation: Architect
- Buildings: National Autonomous University of Mexico, Facultad de Ciencia

Eugenio Peschard Delgado was a Mexican architect. Prior to joining the faculty of the National University in 1940, Peschard was an architect in the Ministry of Communications and Public Works and a member of the Council of Architecture of the Federal District. He translated a number of architectural books, including works by Hardy Cross, S. Timoshenko, and Vanden Broek.

== Early life ==
Born in Mexico sometime between 1877 and 1937, Peschard was the son of José Guadalupe Peschard and Concepción Delgado de Peschard. One of six children, Peschard's brothers were José Angel Peschard Delgado, a doctor and academic; Armando Peschard Delgado, a Mexico City doctor; and Guillermo Peschard, an orthodontic dentist and academic at the Universidad Juárez del Estado de Durango.

== Tour of the United States ==
Peschard traveled to the United States on a trip that was featured in the U.S. Department of State's official Bulletin in 1948, during a period of increased outreach by the U.S. government to foster ties with Mexican officials. Alonso Mariscal, another professor at the National Autonomous University of Mexico, traveled with Peschard to Washington D.C. to begin a two-month study of American methods of teaching architecture. Their visit was funded through the Latin American travel-grant program of the Department of State. Messrs. Marsical and Peschard visited the schools of architecture of Harvard, Columbia University, the Massachusetts Institute of Technology, the Illinois Institute of Technology, and the Chicago Art Institute.

== Contribution to Mexico City architecture ==
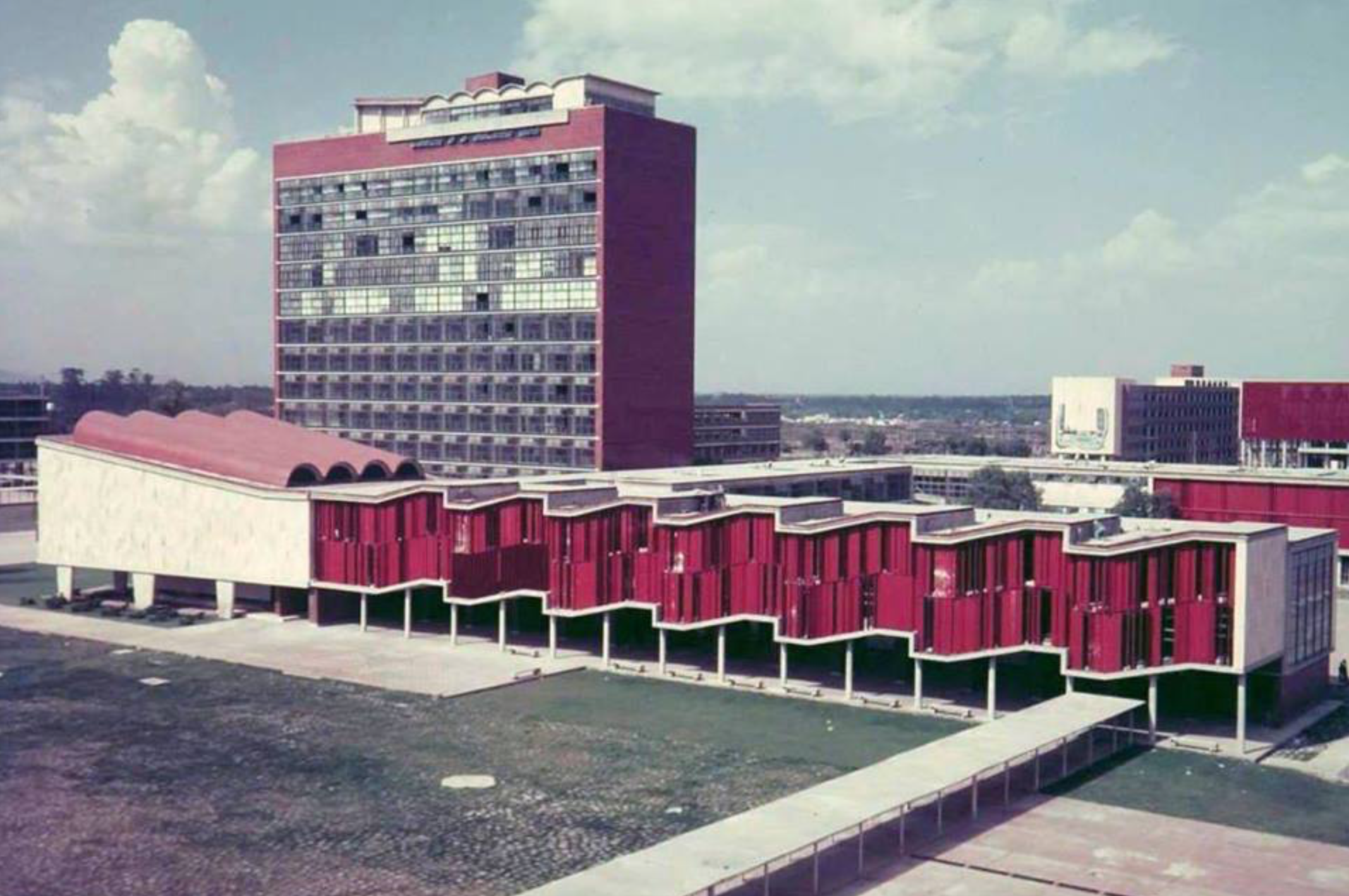
Side aerial view of the science building, UNAM

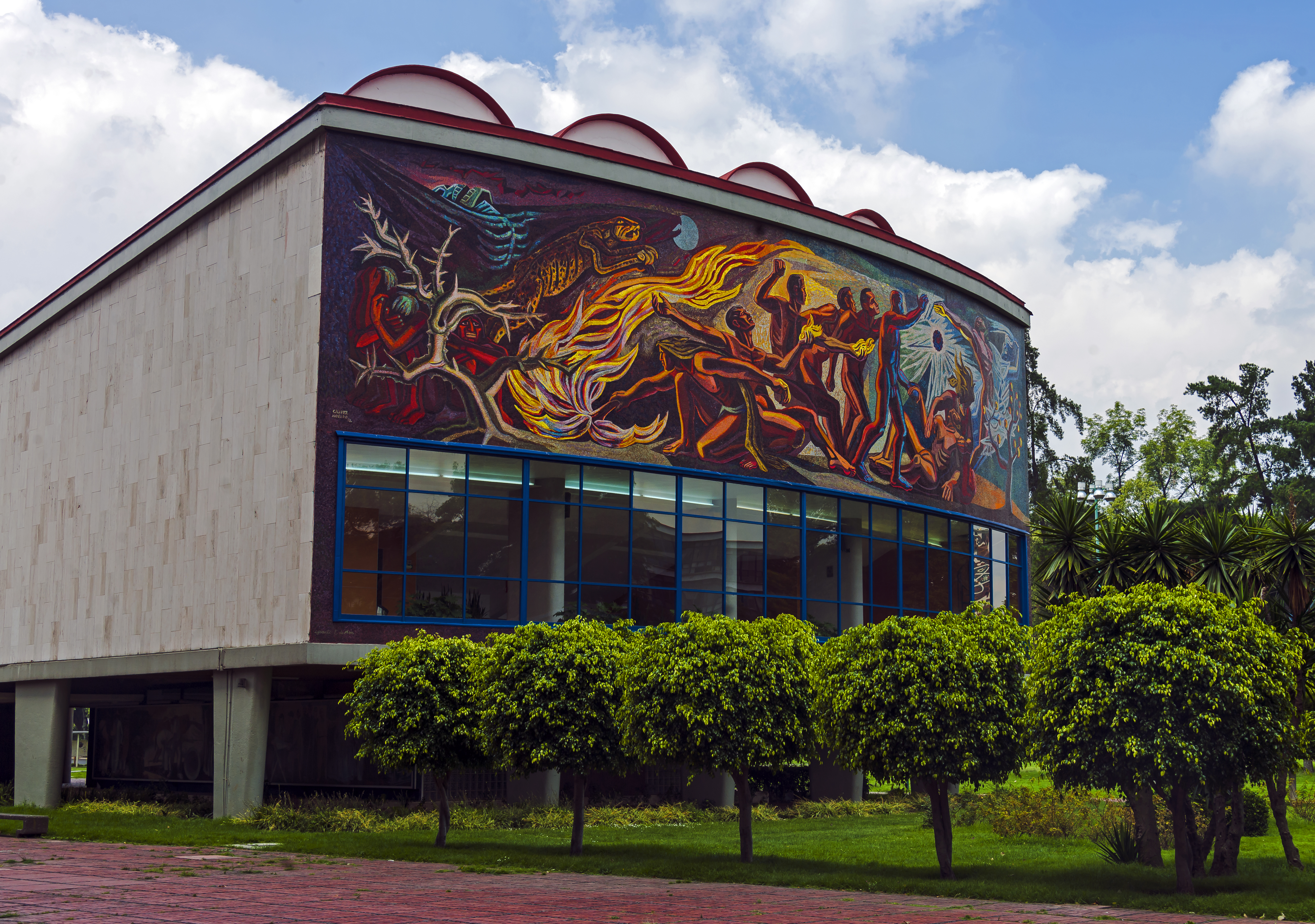
The Conquest of Energy by José Chávez Morado in UNAM, Mexico City.

In the 20th century, Mexico City grew significantly. The construction of the Ciudad Universitaria from 1950 to 1953 had a noticeable effect on subsequent architecture in the city. The most notable buildings are the Rectoría designed by Salvador Ortega, Mario Pani and Enrique del Moral, the Library, by Juan O’Gorman, Gustavo Saavedra and Juan Martínez de Velasco, and the Science Building by Peschard, Raúl Cacho, and Félix Sánchez. According to Daniel Case, "Much of what makes the campus culturally significant is its huge murals that decorate the facades of many of the buildings." These murals were done by Diego Rivera, David Siqueiros and others, with themes relating to Mexican history and identity.

According to architecture historian Valerie Fraser, Peschard's Science Faculty design "counteracts the rather more rigid geometry of the Rectorate," with its mural by José Chávez Morado at the upper part of the facade placed on a convex curve. Entitled The Conquest of Energy, Morado's mural, according to Fraser, is "an allegory of the pursuit and conquest of scientific knowledge," which culminates, "on a slightly ambivalent note," with the discovery of nuclear energy.

In 2004, Celia Ester Arredando Zambrano wrote that the placement of the Science Building at the center of the university's main plaza "reveals that even though the campus was inspired by the modern city, a symbolic arrangement seems to prevail in the composition."

Art historian Justino Fernández highlighted the building's auditorium, as well as its interior peculiarities, in particular what he termed its "unusual classrooms."

== Books ==
- Resistencia de Materiales (Universidad Nacional Autónoma de México, 1963), ISBN 978-8438001028
