= XHUJED-TDT =

University TV station at the Universidad Juárez del Estado de Durango

- Durango, Durango; Mexico
- Channels: Digital: 28 (UHF); Virtual: 9
- Branding: TV UJED

Ownership
- Owner: Universidad Juárez del Estado de Durango

History
- First air date: March 21, 2014
- Call sign meaning: Universidad Juárez del Estado de Durango

Technical information
- Licensing authority: CRT
- ERP: 11.864 kW
- HAAT: −73.9 m (−242 ft)
- Transmitter coordinates: 24°02′25.2″N 104°41′52.8″W

Links
- Website: tv.ujed.mx

XHUJED-TDT is a television station located in Durango, Durango, Mexico. Broadcasting on digital channel 28, XHUJED is owned by the Universidad Juárez del Estado de Durango and is a sister to XHHD-FM 100.5.

== History ==
The university received a permit for a television station on October 2, 2012; at the same time, Cofetel also gave it permission to move the university's AM radio station to FM. The university began transmitting through cable and over the internet, while the over-the-air TV station signed on March 21, 2014.

In 2015, the IFT allowed XHUJED to move from Cerro de los Remedios to a new site northwest of the city.

In March 2018, in order to facilitate the repacking of TV services out of the 600 MHz band (channels 38-51), XHUJED was assigned channel 28 for continued digital operations.

XHUJED-TDT's concession lapsed in 2024. The station went off the air in June awaiting reauthorization under a new concession, which was awarded May 29, 2024, as XHCPGP-TDT and changed to XHUJED-TDT on August 30.

== Programming ==
XHUJED programming includes a newscast covering university events, Noticias UJED, that airs three times daily, as well as other UJED, local and national cultural programming.
