= Santiago Pedro Cortés =

Mexican politician

- Born: 25 July 1954 (age 71); Oaxaca, Mexico
- Occupation: Politician
- Political party: PASD

Santiago Gustavo Pedro Cortés (born 25 July 1954) is a Mexican politician formerly from the Social Democratic Party.

He has served as a federal deputy on two occasions: from 1998 to 2000, for the 57th Congress, representing Durango's fifth district as the substitute of Alejandro González Yáñez, and from 2006 to 2009, during the 60th Congress, as a plurinominal deputy for the fourth region.
