= Alexandro Martínez Camberos =

Mexican poet, writer, lawyer and judge

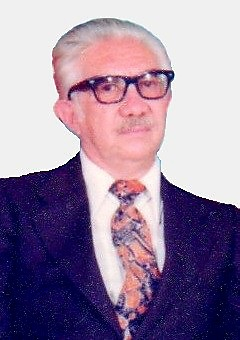
- Born: 22 June 1916; Durango, Durango, Mexico
- Died: 7 February 1999 (aged 82); Mexico City
- Resting place: Durango, Durango, Mexico
- Education: Universidad Juárez del Estado de Durango
- Occupations: Poet, writer, lawyer, judge
- Writing career
- Language: Spanish
- Period: 20th century
- Genres: poetry, essay
- Notable work: Flor Durango

Alexandro Martínez Camberos (22 June 1916 – 7 February 1999) was a Mexican poet, writer, lawyer and judge. He published articles and essays in several newspapers and wrote books on poetry, jurisprudence and social issues.

== Biography ==
He was born in Durango City, capital of the Mexican state of Durango, on 22 June 1916, in the middle of the Mexican revolution, son of Benito Martínez, a dentist, and Elena Camberos, a pianist. At an early age he became interested in social issues and showed writing aptitude for prose and verse. He studied law at the Juárez University of the State of Durango (UJED), graduating in 1939, and obtained the doctorate at the National Autonomous University of Mexico (UNAM) en 1953.

He became professor at the UJED, district judge in Durango from 1962 to 1967, legal consultant to the federal Secretary of Industry and Trade, head of the Department of Constitutional Protection of the same unit, first secretary of the First Circuit Court, plurinominal federal deputy from 1988 to 1991 in the LIV Legislature of the Mexican Congress and member of the UJED Legal Research Institute in the nineties.

He died on 7 February 1999 in Mexico City, where he lived for more than 30 years.

== Literary work ==
Alexandro Martínez Camberos published during more than 60 years countless articles and essays in various newspapers and wrote books of poetry, jurisprudence and social issues. His work is divided into three main groups:

=== Law and Sociology ===
- El problema de la justificación del estado (1939, reprinted in 1997)
- La ciencia del derecho y los valores (1953)
- Los delitos de disolución social (1958)
- La Revolución quedó atrás... y está adelante (1959)
- Planeación y planificación políticas (1960)
- La ciencia del progreso social (1962)
- Ciencia, conciencia y efficiencia políticas (1962)
- ABC del desarrollo social (1962)
- Guía para tesis de abogado (1967)
- Hacia una verdadera ciencia del derecho (Bases para una sociología jurídica) (1984)

=== Poetry ===
- 33 poemas (1935)
- Estrella de cinco puntas (1939, reprinted in 1971)
- Poemas ignorados (1942)
- Ciudad y canto (1943)
- Berilos (1944)
- Amaranto. Sonata en amor mayor (1946)
- La patria sustantiva. Poema en forja (1949)
- Levántate Cuauhtémoc (1951)
- 2 poemas por la paz (1951)
- Ellos son poderosos... andamios para un poema (1953)
- Acróstico del cénit (1954)
- Sexto y séptimo círculos (1957)
- Canción alucinada (1957)
- Un cielo azul Durango (1957)
- Flor Durango (1963)
- Ella, cifra del hombre (1972)
- Treguas íntimas (1982)

=== Narrative ===
- Los 7 signos (1966)
- Compañero (1981, compilation)
- Andamios (1991)
- Bitácora terrestre (1990s, autobiography, weekly episodes in newspaper, book compilation)

== Homages ==
In his honor, the library of the UJED Legal Research Institute bears his name since 1995.

When he died, his ashes were deposited in the roots of a small pine tree in the UJED rectorate building. Officially named Alexandrian Pine (Pino Alexandrino), it has grown and has already exceeded the second floor height.

Each year, the UJED and the Society of Writers of Durango remember him on his death anniversary with lectures, readings of his poems and flowers at the Alexandrian Pine.
