= Ricardo Pacheco Rodríguez =

Mexican politician

- Born: 18 September 1963 (age 62); Guadalupe Victoria, Durango, Mexico
- Education: UJED
- Occupations: Deputy and Senator
- Political party: PRI

Ricardo Fidel Pacheco Rodríguez (born 18 September 1963) is a Mexican politician affiliated with the PRI. As of 2013 he served as Deputy of the LXII Legislature of the Mexican Congress representing Durango. He also served as Senator during the LX and LXI Legislatures.
