= Francisco Victoria =

Mexican military personnel (1796–1830)

- Born: Francisco Fernández y Félix; 1796; Tamazula de Victoria, Nueva Vizcaya, New Spain
- Died: 11 September 1830 (aged 33–34); Puebla de Zaragoza, Puebla, First Mexican Republic
- Relatives: Guadalupe Victoria (brother)

Francisco Fernández y Félix, better known as Francisco Victoria, (1796 – 11 September 1830) was an insurgent of the Mexican War of Independence. Being a republican and federalist ideologue, he fought against the imperialist regime of Agustín de Iturbide and the centralist regime of Anastasio Bustamante.

== Biography ==
His parents were Manuel Fernández and Alejandra Félix. Like his brother, Guadalupe Victoria, he adopted the surname Victoria once he joined the struggle for independence on 16 June 1821. He formed a division within the modern state of Durango.

Due to his opposition to the ideas of Agustín de Iturbide, he was imprisoned in Mexico City. After the First Mexican Empire, he participated in various war commissions in Durango, Guanajuato, and Veracruz. In 1829, he with Antonio López de Santa Anna fought against the attempted reconquest of Mexico commanded by Isidro Barradas. In 1830, he joined Juan Álvarez's campaign to defend the cause of Vicente Guerrero, who had lost the presidency to the Jalapa Plan. On 21 April 1830, he was taken prisoner by Tomás Moreno, but escaped with help from friends. On 9 September, while trevling with Agapito Casasola, he was again apprehended at mill in Puebla owned by governor Cosme Furlong. He was sentenced to death, and promptly executed on 11 September 1830 under the orders of Albino Pérez, sergeant major of the 5th regiment. His brother's absence of a rescue attempt has been attributed to him being physically unable.

== Bibliography ==
- Flaccus, Elmer W. (1967). "Guadalupe Victoria: His Personality as a Cause of His Failure". The Americas. 23 (3): 310. doi:10.2307/980472. ISSN 0003-1615. JSTOR 980472. S2CID 147155885.
- González Pedrero, Enrique (2004). País de un solo hombre: el México de Santa Anna. Volumen II. La sociedad de fuego cruzado 1829-1836. México: Fondo de Cultura Económica. ISBN 968-16-6377-2.
- Olavarría y Ferrari, Enrique de (1880). "México independiente 1821–1855". In Vicente Riva Palacio (ed.). México a través de los siglos. México: Ballescá y Cía.
