= XHHD-FM =

University radio station in Durango

- Durango, Durango; Mexico
- Broadcast area: Durango
- Frequency: 100.5 MHz
- Branding: Radio Universidad

Programming
- Format: College

Ownership
- Owner: Universidad Juárez del Estado de Durango
- Sister stations: XHUJED-TDT

History
- First air date: 1976 (on AM); March 21, 2013 (on FM)
- Former call signs: XEHD-AM (to 2013)
- Former frequencies: 1270 AM (to 2013)

Technical information
- Licensing authority: CRT
- Class: B1
- ERP: 25 kWs
- HAAT: 48.1 m (158 ft)
- Transmitter coordinates: 24°02′25.2″N 104°41′52.8″W

Links
- Website: radio.ujed.mx

XHHD-FM is a radio station in Durango, Durango. Broadcasting on 100.5 FM, XHHD is owned by the Universidad Juárez del Estado de Durango.

== History ==
The station signed on in 1976 as XEHD-AM 1270 and migrated to FM as part of the Mexican government's scheme to migrate stations from AM to FM.

In 2011, UJED signed a contract to allow a community radio station in Tayoltita, San Dimas Municipality, to retransmit its programs to serve the Primero Empresa Minera plant there. In 2015, this station received a regular concession and became XHPEM-FM 100.7.
