= Guillermo Peschard =

Mexican orthodontist (1902–1978)

Guillermo Alfonso Peschard Delgado
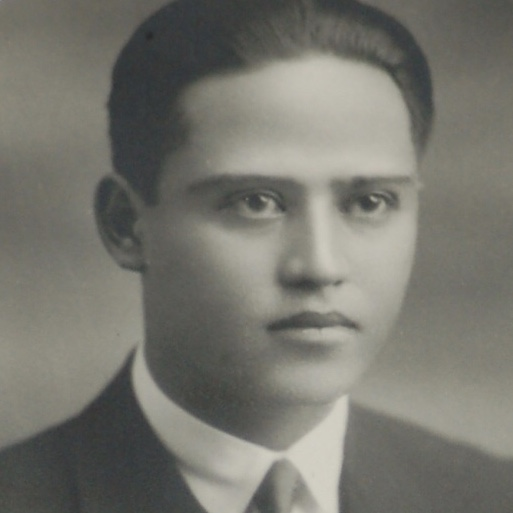
- Born: August 19, 1902; Durango, Mexico
- Died: April 21, 1978 (aged 75); Durango, Mexico
- Education: Universidad Juárez del Estado de Durango (BA); National Autonomous University of Mexico (DDS)
- Scientific career
- Fields: Orthodontist
- Workplaces: Universidad Juárez del Estado de Durango

Guillermo Peschard Delgado (August 19, 1902 – April 21, 1978) was an orthodontic dentist and academic. As a professor of dentistry at the Universidad Juárez del Estado de Durango, he helped found the university's School of Dentistry.

== Biography ==
Peschard was born in the city of Durango, Mexico, on August 19, 1902. He was one of several siblings, including his brothers Armando Peschard Delgado and Eugenio Peschard. He completed his undergraduate training at the Juárez Institute, after which he moved to Mexico City, where he taught at the Escuela Nacional Preparatoria. Immediately after, Peschard began his course of study in dentistry at the National Autonomous University of Mexico. He graduated with his DDS in May 1926.

Peschard moved back to Durango after completing his studies, where he held the director position of the Durango Hospital and the Subdirector of the "Children of the Army" School during the Governorship of Blas Corral Martinez (1944–1947). Peschard simultaneously served in private practice for over fifty years. In his dentistry practice, he was regionally famous for protesting gold fillings and introducing porcelain substitutes in 1965. He gained a reputation as a respectful and empathetic doctor and reportedly would call into people's homes to check on their pain levels.

In his personal life, Peschard was an artist. He would sketch in charcoal, pencil, and pen, as well as paint in oils and watercolors. He also sculpted in gold, silver, and bronze, and carved in wood and plaster. Peschard married Carmen Peschard, with whom he had four daughters: Carmen, María Eugenia, Teresa, and Graciela. In his second marriage to Carmen Vazquez Barrera, he had three sons: Guillermo, Gabriel, and Jorge.

He died on April 21, 1978, in Durango, Mexico of a heart attack.

== UJED School of Dentistry ==
Peschard was instrumental in the creation of the School of Dentistry at the Universidad Juárez del Estado de Durango. It opened on February 13, 1974 and Peschard was unanimously elected the first faculty director.
