= Ricardo López Pescador =

Mexican politician

- Born: 15 October 1964 (age 61); Canatlán, Durango, Mexico
- Occupation: Politician
- Political party: PRI

José Ricardo López Pescador (born 15 October 1954) is a Mexican politician from the Institutional Revolutionary Party (PRI). From 2009 to 2012 he served as a federal deputy in the 61st Congress, representing Durango's first district.
