= Ricardo Lopes =

Ricardo Lopes may refer to:

- Ricardo Lopes (footballer, born 1968), Portuguese football winger
- Ricardo Lopes (footballer, born 1977), Brazilian football midfielder
- Ricardo Lopes (footballer, born 1990), Brazilian football winger
