= Jorge Salum del Palacio =

Mexican politician (born 1962)

- Born: 1 September 1962 (age 63); Victoria de Durango, Durango, Mexico
- Occupation: Politician
- Political party: PAN, MC

Jorge Alejandro Salum del Palacio (born 1 September 1962) is a Mexican politician. Originally affiliated with the National Action Party (PAN), he broke with them in 2024 and joined the Citizens' Movement (MC).

In 2006–2009 he served as a federal deputy in the 50th Congress, representing Durango's 4th district for the National Action Party (PAN). He contended again for Durango's 4th in the 2018 general election and, although he was originally declared the winner, his opponent – Hilda Patricia Ortega Nájera of Morena – successfully challenged the result before the electoral court and was awarded the seat.

He later served as the municipal president of his birthplace, Victoria de Durango, in 2019–2022.

Salum left the PAN in February 2024 and joined the Citizens' Movement (MC). He sought election as one of Durango's senators in the 2024 Senate election, occupying the first place on the MC's two-name formula; the party placed third in the state with 6.34% of the vote and, consequently, Salum's Senate bid was unsuccessful.
