= Tamazula de Victoria =

City in the Mexican state of Durango

- Municipal seat and city
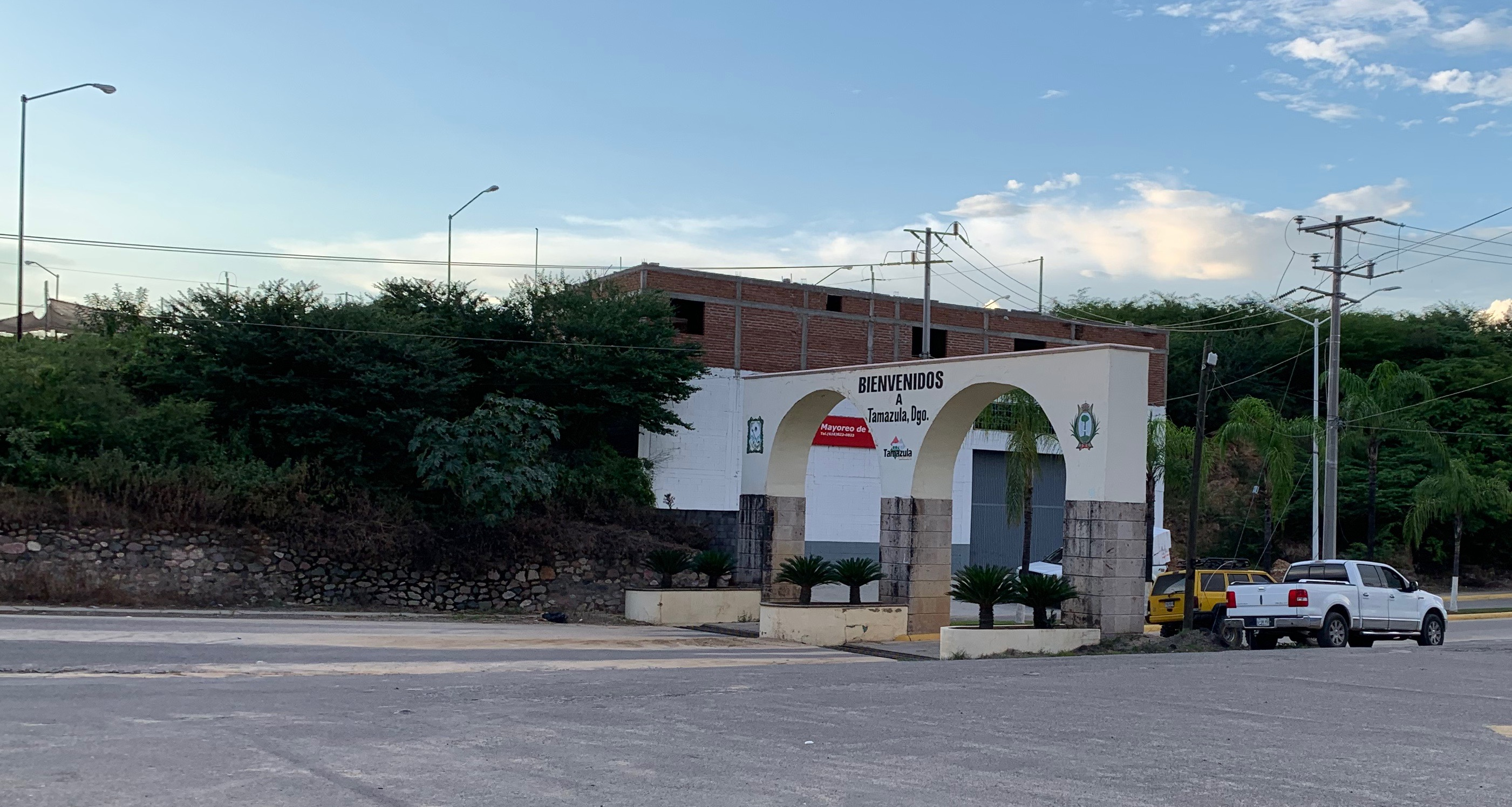
- Arch in Tamazula

- Seal

- Location in Mexico Tamazula de Victoria (Mexico)
- Coordinates: 24°58′12″N 106°57′56″W
- Country: Mexico
- State: Durango
- Municipality: Tamazula

Government
  - Municipal President: Ricardo Ochoa Beltran
- Elevation: 245 m (804 ft)

Population (2010)
  - Total: 2,337
- Time zone: UTC-6 (CST)
- Postalcode: 34580
- Website: http://www.tamazuladgo.gob.mx/index.html

Tamazula de Victoria is a small town and seat of the municipality of Tamazula in the Mexican state of Durango. The town is located approximately 53 mi (85 km) east of the city center of Culiacán, Sinaloa, in the Sierra Madre Occidental mountains. The Tamazula River crescents directly north of the city.

Colloquially known as Tamazula, its official name is Tamazula de Victoria after the first president of Mexico's adopted last name was added. General Guadalupe Victoria, the first president of Mexico, and his brother Francisco Victoria were born in Tamazula. As of 2010, the town had a population of 2,337

== History ==
In the seventeenth century, Jesuit missionaries founded Mission San Ignacio de Tamazula.

== Villages ==
The municipal subdivisions of Tamazula are:

- Amaculi
- Los Remedios
- El Chicural
- El Cocoyole
- Chacala
- El Llano
- El Comedero
- Las Juntas
- Las Quebradas
- El Río
- Pueblo Viejo
- El Carrizo
- Otatitlán
- Las Coloradas
- Santa Elena
- El Cajón
- La Mesa del Rodeo
- El Durazno
- La Alameda
- Santa Gertrudis
- El Tecuán
- Santa Barbara
- Cuesta Blanca

== Gallery ==
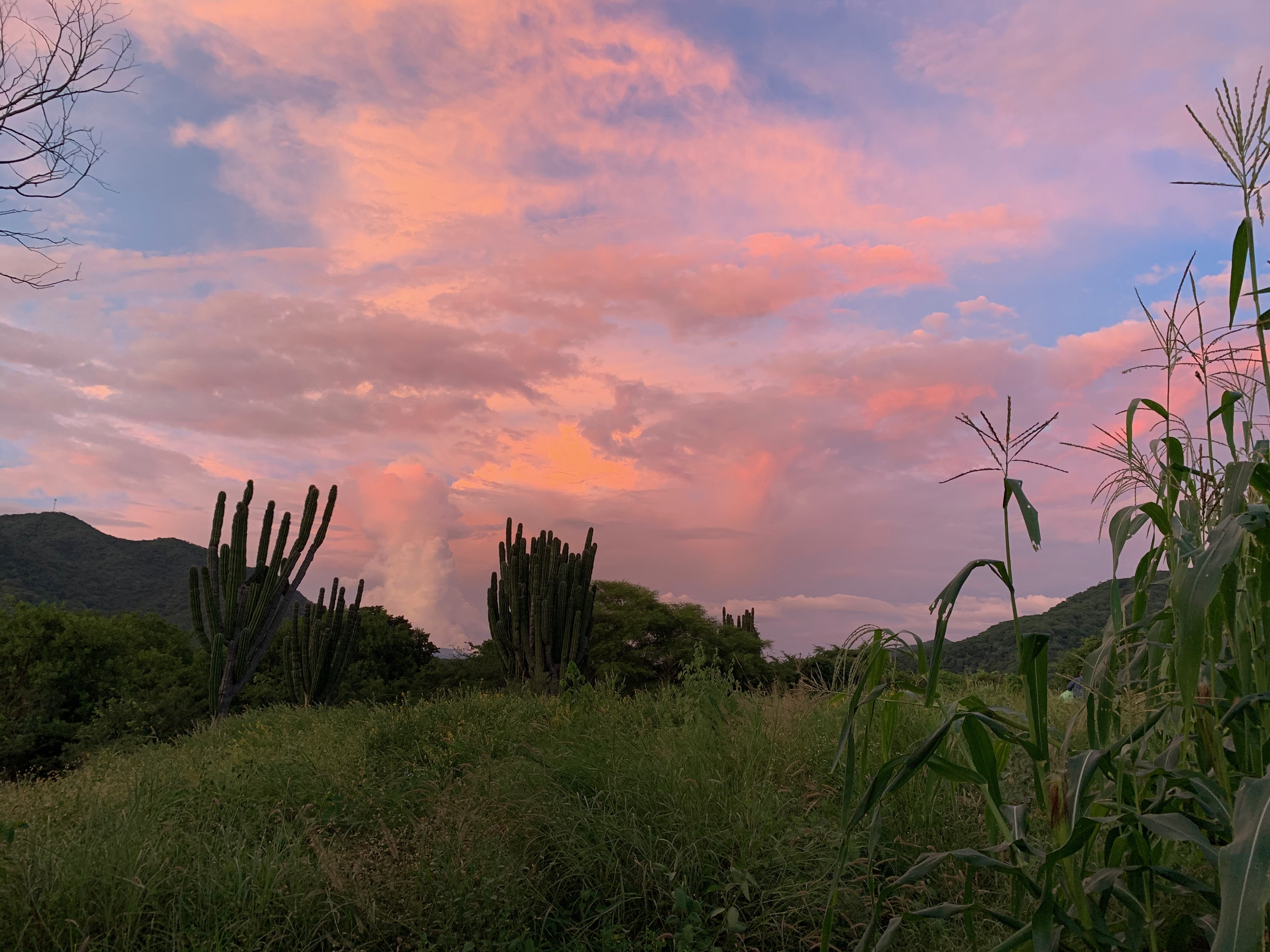
Cactus Cardon Guajiro and Corn at Sunset after a summer thunderstorm in Tamazula, Durango

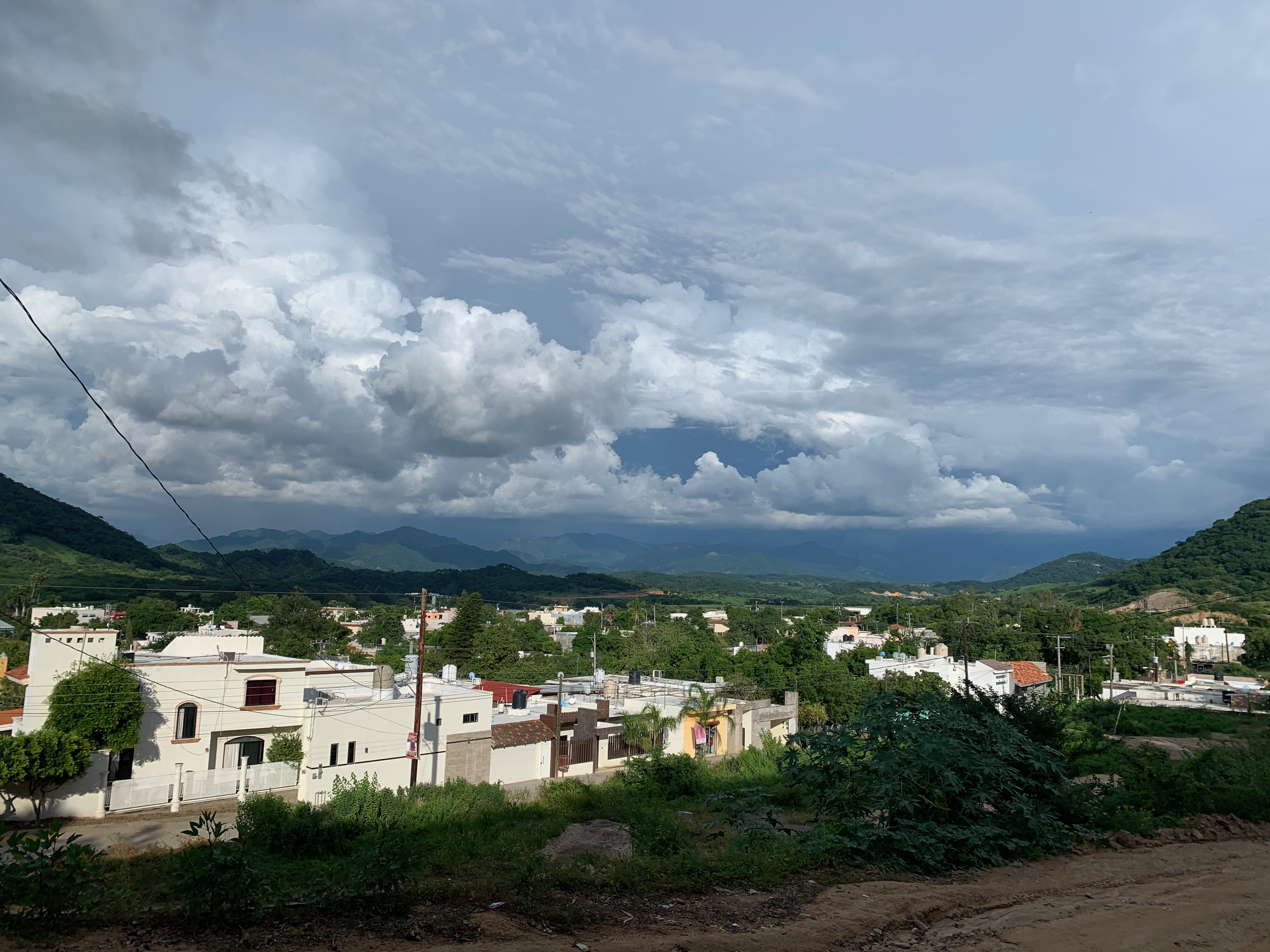
Hillside view looking East

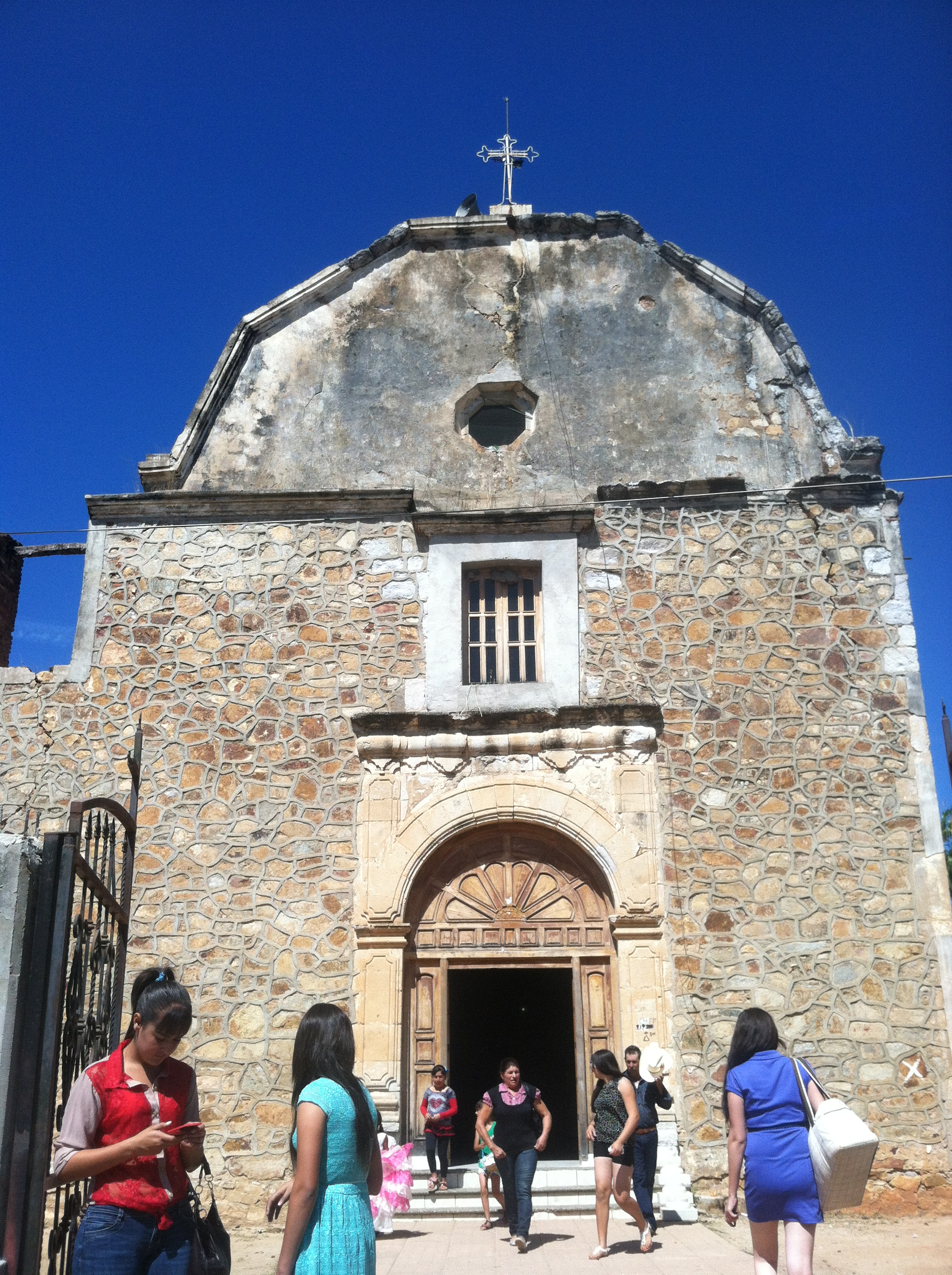
Templo San Ignacio de Layola Catholic Church

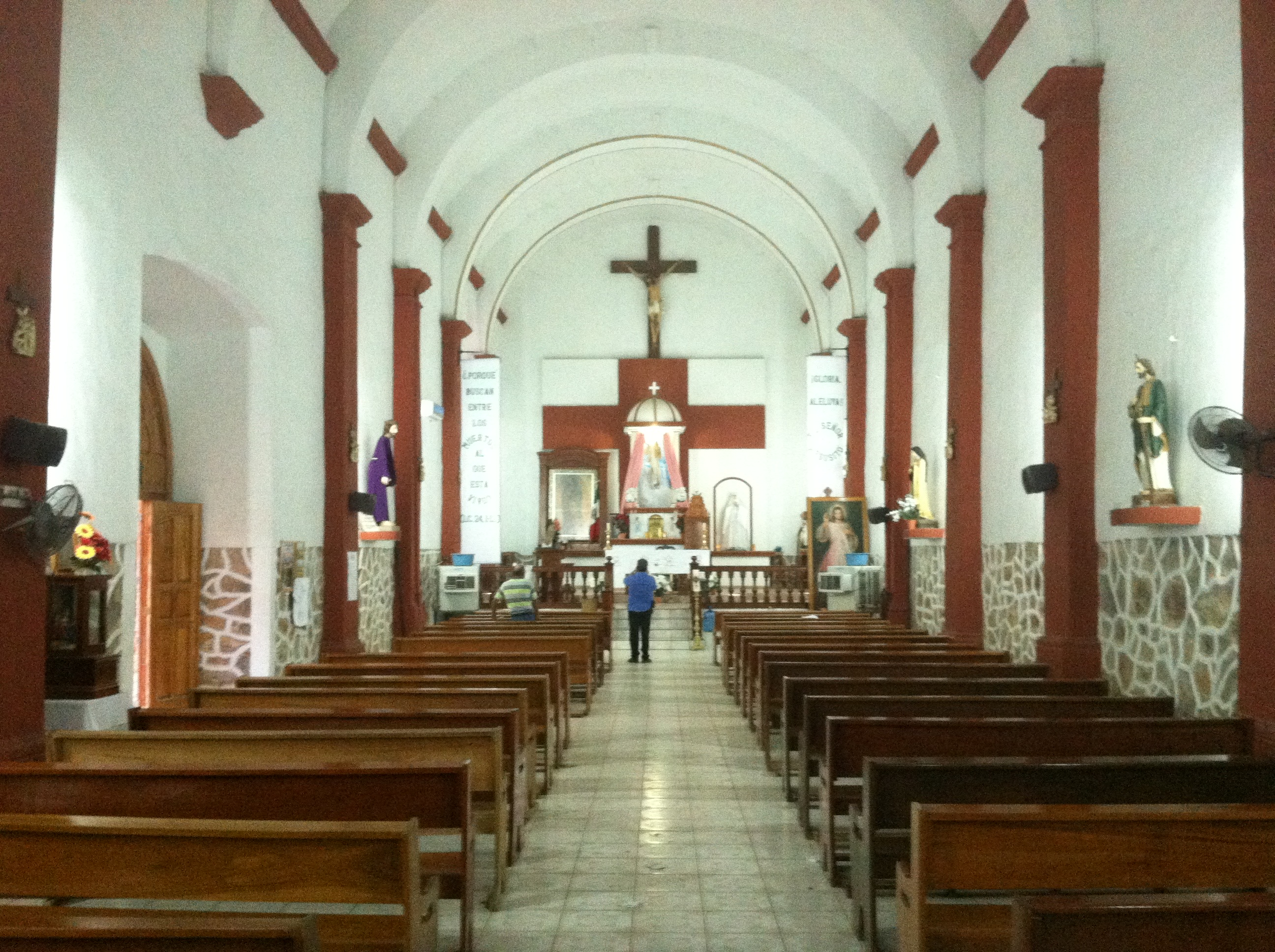
Interior view of San Ignacio de Layola Catholic Church altar in 2013

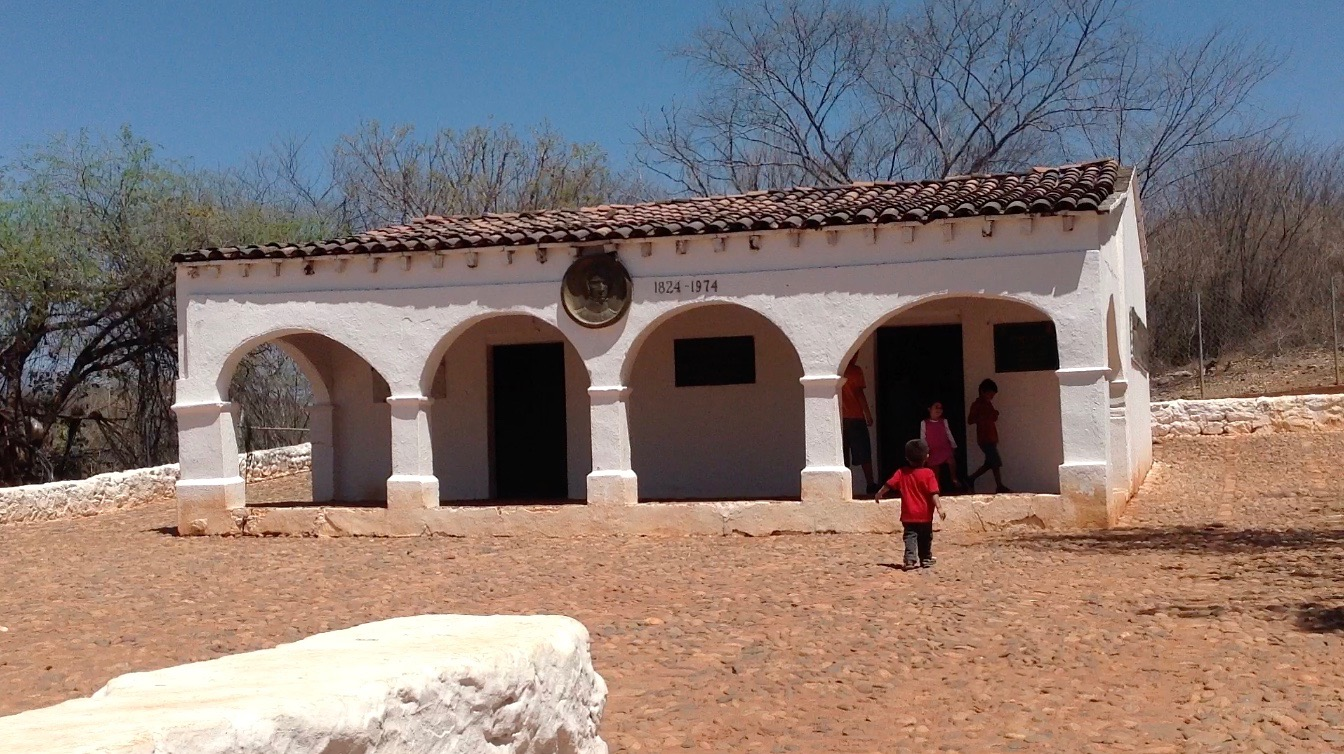
1786 Birthplace and childhood home of Guadalupe Victoria. Now a museum
