= Tamazula Municipality =

Municipality in the Mexican state of Durango

Tamazula
- Municipality
- Municipality of Tamazula in Durango

- Location in Mexico
- Coordinates: 24°56′10″N 106°58′30″W
- Country: Mexico
- State: Durango
- Municipal seat: Tamazula de Victoria

Government
  - Municipal President: Ricardo Ochoa Beltran

Area
  - Total: 5,188.1 km^{2} (2,003.1 sq mi)

Population (2010)
  - Total: 26,368
  - Density: 5.0824/km^{2} (13.163/sq mi)
- Time zone: UTC-6 (Zona Centro)

Tamazula is a municipality in the Mexican state of Durango. The municipal seat lies at Tamazula de Victoria. The municipality covers an area of 5188.1 km^{2}.

As of 2020, the municipality had a total population of 26,300. A .26% drop from 2010.

The municipality had 865 localities, the largest of which (with 2010 populations in parentheses) were: Tamazula de Victoria (2,337), classified as urban, and El Durazno (1,044), classified as rural.
