= Jaime Fernández Saracho =

Mexican politician

- Born: 28 February 1957 (age 69); Poanas, Durango, Mexico
- Occupations: Teacher and politician
- Political party: PRI

Jaime Fernández Saracho (born 28 February 1957) is a Mexican teacher and politician affiliated with the Institutional Revolutionary Party (PRI). In 2003–2006 he served as a federal deputy in the 59th Congress, representing Durango's 4th district.
