= Ángel Sergio Guerrero Mier =

Mexican politician (1935–2021)

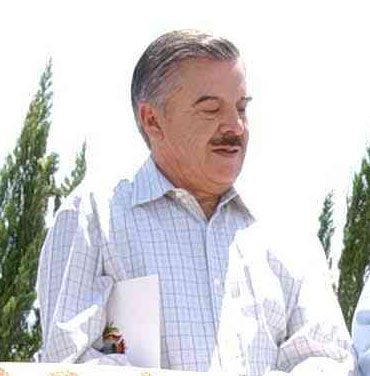

Ángel Sergio Guerrero Mier (18 August 1935 – 10 January 2021) was a Mexican lawyer and politician, member of the Institutional Revolutionary Party and was Governor of Durango between 1998 and 2004.

Ángel Sergio Guerrero was a lawyer from the Universidad Juárez del Estado de Durango, held diverse positions in the government of the state between which he served as Head of Interior, Senior officer and Secretary General of Government between 1970 and 1974.

In addition he was state President of the PRI, Local Deputy and Federal Deputy on three occasions in the L, LIII and LVII Legislatures.

In 1998, he was the PRI candidate for Governor of Durango, winning the election with 40% of the vote, compared to 29% for his nearest rival, María del Rosario Castro Lozano of the National Action Party.

Preceded by Maximiliano Silerio	Governor of Durango; 1998–2004	Succeeded by Ismael Hernández
