= Jorge Herrera Caldera =

Mexican politician

Governor of Durango
- In office 15 September 2010 – 14 September 2016
- Preceded by: Ismael Hernández
- Succeeded by: José Rosas Aispuro

President of the National Conference of Governors
- In office 11 October 2014 – 25 de February 2015
- Preceded by: Carlos Lozano de la Torre
- Succeeded by: Mariano González Zarur

Personal details
- Born: 8 January 1963 (age 63) Durango, Durango
- Party: PRI

Jorge Herrera Caldera (born January 8, 1963) is a Mexican who has served as the governor of Durango from 2010 to 2016. He is a member of the Institutional Revolutionary Party PRI. Herrera was elected Governor of Durango in 2010 with 46.4% of the vote, narrowly defeating challenger José Rosas Aispuro of the Party of the Democratic Revolution (PRD) and National Action Party (PAN), who placed second with 44.7% of the vote. He was sworn into office on September 15, 2010. He previously served as the municipal president of Durango Municipality.

Political offices
Preceded by Ismael Hernández	Governor of Durango; 2010 — 2016	Succeeded by José Rosas Aispuro
