= Durango Municipality =

Municipality in the Mexican state of Durango

Durango
- Municipality
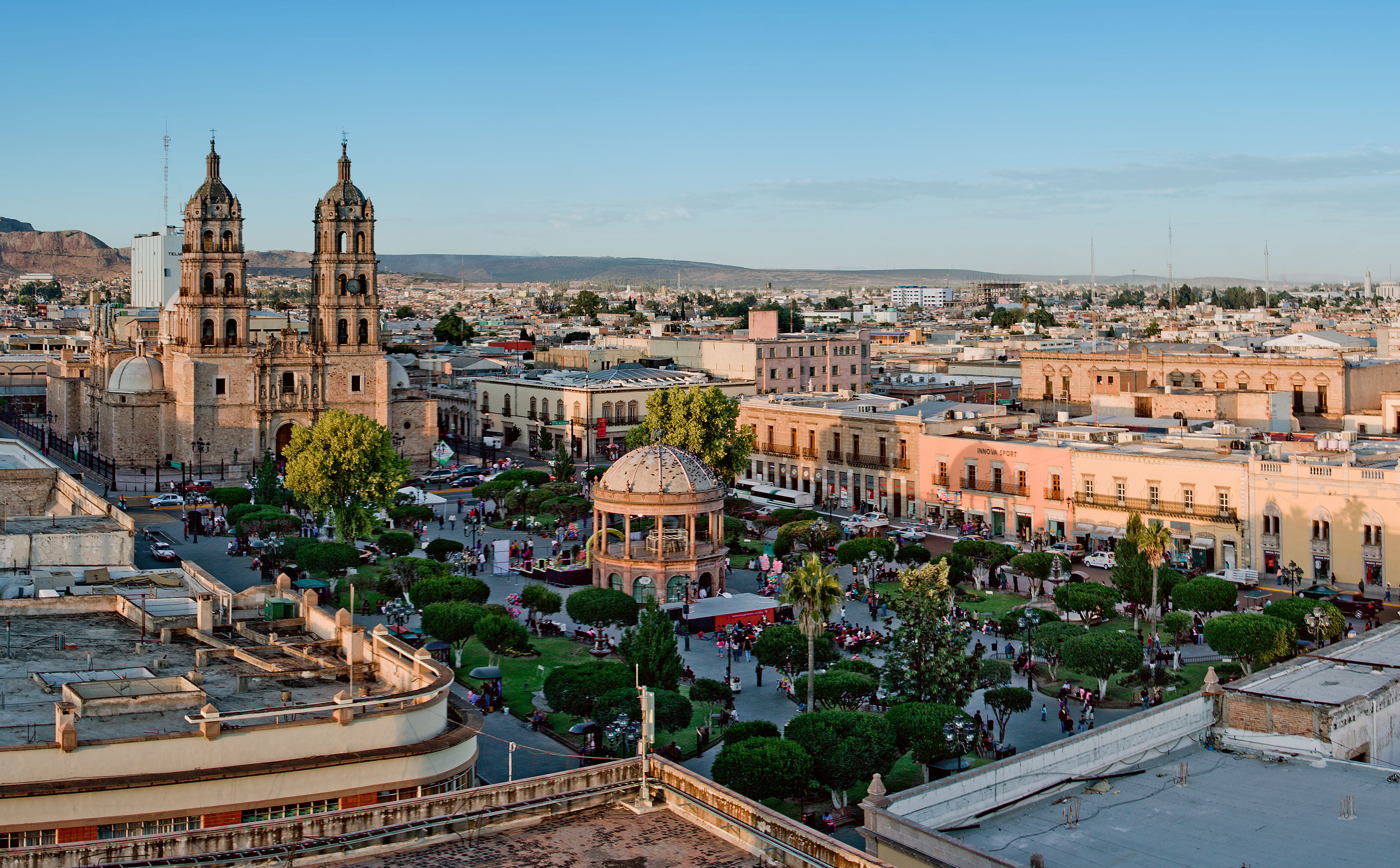
- City of Durango

- Location within Durango Location within Mexico
- Coordinates: 24°01′30″N 104°40′03″W
- Country: Mexico
- State: Durango
- Municipal seat: Victoria de Durango

Government
  - Federal electoral district: DGO-1 & DGO-4

Area
  - Total: 10,041 km^{2} (3,877 sq mi)

Population (2010)
  - Total: 582,267
  - Density: 57.989/km^{2} (150.19/sq mi)
- Time zone: UTC–06:00 (Zona Centro)

Durango is a municipality in the Mexican state of Durango. The municipal seat lies at Victoria de Durango, the state capital. The municipality covers an area of 10,041 km^{2}.

As of 2010, the municipality had a total population of 582,267, up from 526,659 as of 2005.

The municipality had 1,323 localities, the largest of which (with 2010 populations in parentheses) were: Victoria de Durango (518,709), El Nayar (3,308), Cinco de Mayo (2,249), classified as urban, and La Ferrería (Cuatro de Octubre) (2,021), José María Pino Suárez (2,014), Colonia Hidalgo (1,986), Llano Grande (1,938), Sebastián Lerdo de Tejada (1,712), Villa Montemorelos (1,617), Banderas del Águila (1,274), José Refugio Salcido (1,262), Santiago Bayacora (1,218), Cinco de Febrero (1,131), José María Morelos y Pavón (La Tinaja) (1,072), and El Arenal (San Jerónimo) (1,015), classified as rural.
