= Governor of Durango =

Governor of Mexican state

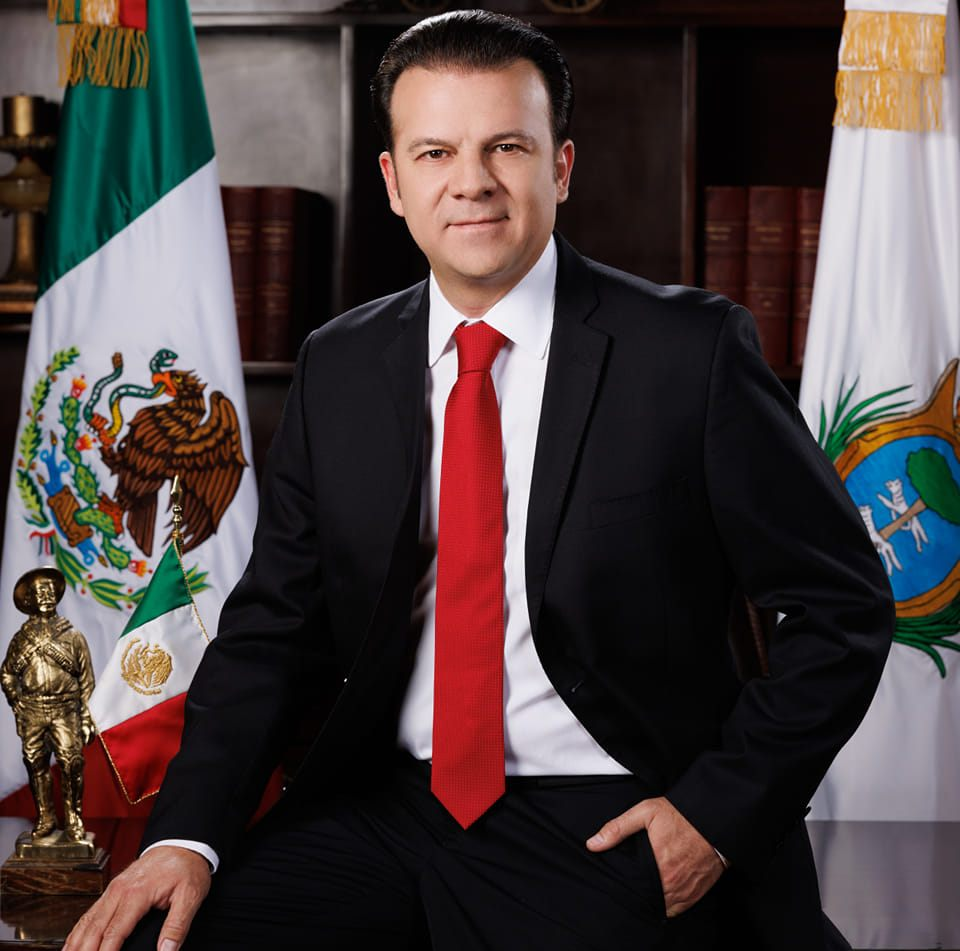
- Incumbent; Esteban Villegas Villarreal since September 15, 2022
- Inaugural holder: Ángel Pinilla

Under the Political Constitution of the Free and Sovereign State of Durango, the exercise of the Executive authority of this Mexican government unit is reserved for an individual known as the Constitutional Governor of the Free and Sovereign State of Durango. This post is held for a period of 6 years, and no re-election is permitted. The governor's term begins on September 15 of the year of the election and finishes on September 14 after having passed six years. The post is open to all citizens meeting the following criteria: a natural born citizen of Mexico, at least 30 years of age, and a resident of Durango for an unbroken period of 5 years prior to election.

== Governors of the Free and Sovereign State of Durango ==
- (1936–1940): Enrique R. Calderón
- (1940–1944): Elpidio G. Velázquez
- (1944–1947): Blas Corral Martínez
- (1947): Francisco Celis
- (1947–1950): José Ramón Valdés
- (1950–1956): Enrique Torres Sánchez
- (1956–1962): Francisco González de la Vega
- (1962): Rafael Hernández Piedras
- (1962–1966): Enrique Dupré Ceniceros
- (1966–1968): Ángel Rodríguez Solórzano
- (1968–1974): Alejandro Páez Urquidi
- (1974–1979): Héctor Mayagoitia Domínguez
- (1979–1980): Salvador Gámiz Fernández
- (1980–1986): Armando del Castillo Franco
- (1986–1992): José Ramírez Gamero
- (1992–1998): Maximiliano Silerio Esparza
- (1998–2004): Ángel Sergio Guerrero Mier
- (2004–2010): Ismael Hernández
- (2010–2016): Jorge Herrera Caldera
- (2016–2022): José Rosas Aispuro
- (2022–present): Esteban Villegas Villarreal

== See also ==
- List of Mexican state governors
