= Universidad Juárez del Estado de Durango =

Public university in Durango, Mexico

- Type: Public Research University
- Established: 1856
- President: Rubén Solís Ríos
- Students: 14,623 (Fall 2014)
- Location: Durango, Durango, Mexico
- Colors: Red and white
- Website: UJED

The Universidad Juárez del Estado de Durango (Juarez University of the State of Durango, or UJED) is a public research university in the state of Durango, Mexico. Founded in 1856 as a small state college, the university underwent a series of expansions over the course of the 19th and 20th centuries, emerging as a full-scale public research institute in the 1970s with the addition of a medical school and an institute of scientific research. Today the university is one of the largest in the state of Durango, with an enrollment of over 14,000 students.

== History ==
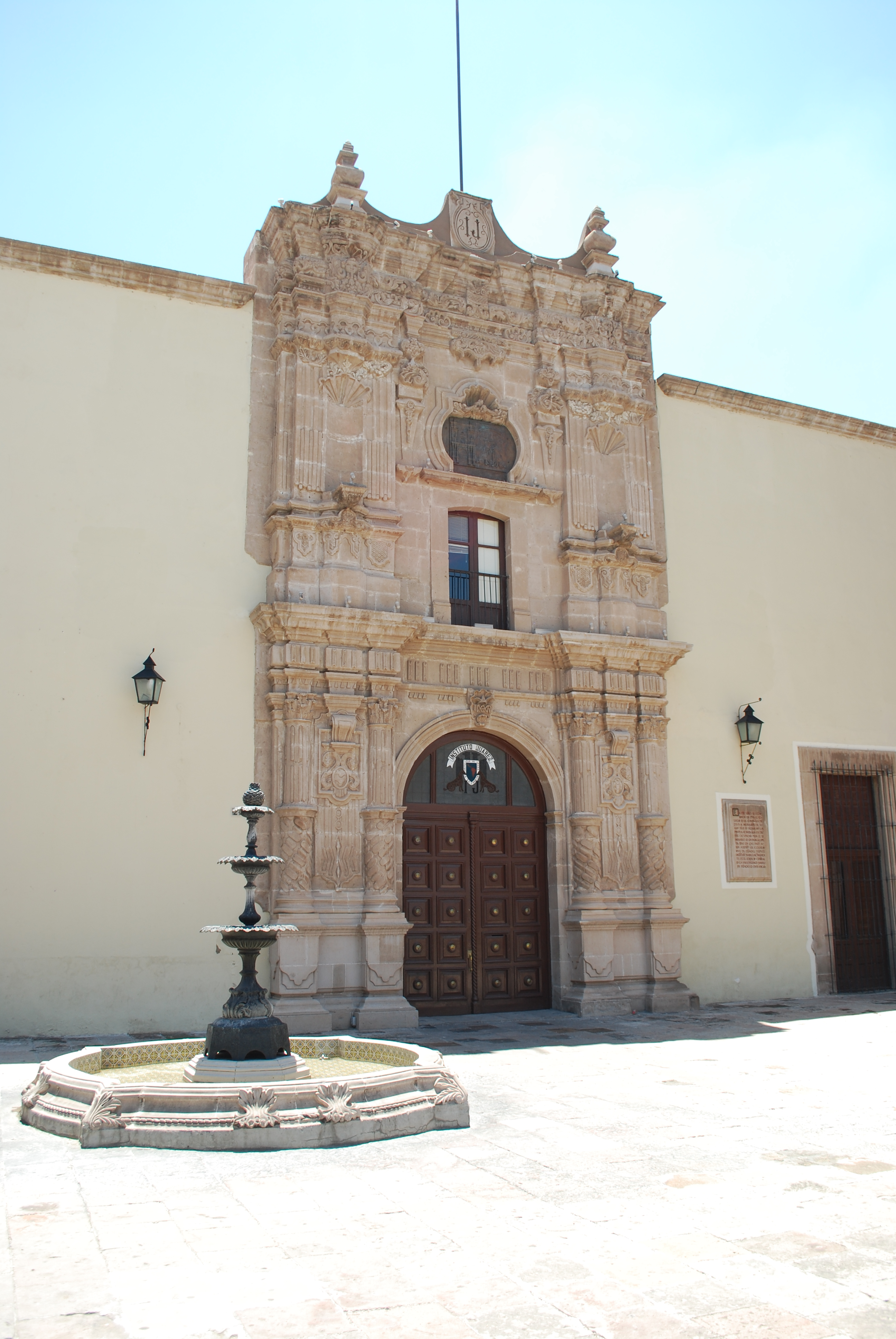
The central building of the university in the Plaza de los Fundadores.

=== Foundation ===
In 1856, José de la Bárcena founded the Colegio Civil del Estado (State Civil College); this institution occupied the university's Central Building on January 25, 1860. The original motto was Virtuti et Merito (Virtue and Merit).

The central building had previously belonged to the Seminario Conciliar (Council Seminary), a Jesuit institution that specialized in training priests and lawyers. The foundation of the Civil College was part of a struggle between church and state that played out in Mexican higher education in the second half of the 19th century. When it started, the Civil College began to lure academics, resources and endowed chairs from the Seminario, which ultimately closed in 1859.

Upon the death of Benito Juárez in 1872, students and teachers petitioned the government to name the institution after him; it thus became known as the Instituto Juárez (Juarez Institute). The school's original colors were red and white.

=== Evolution into a university ===
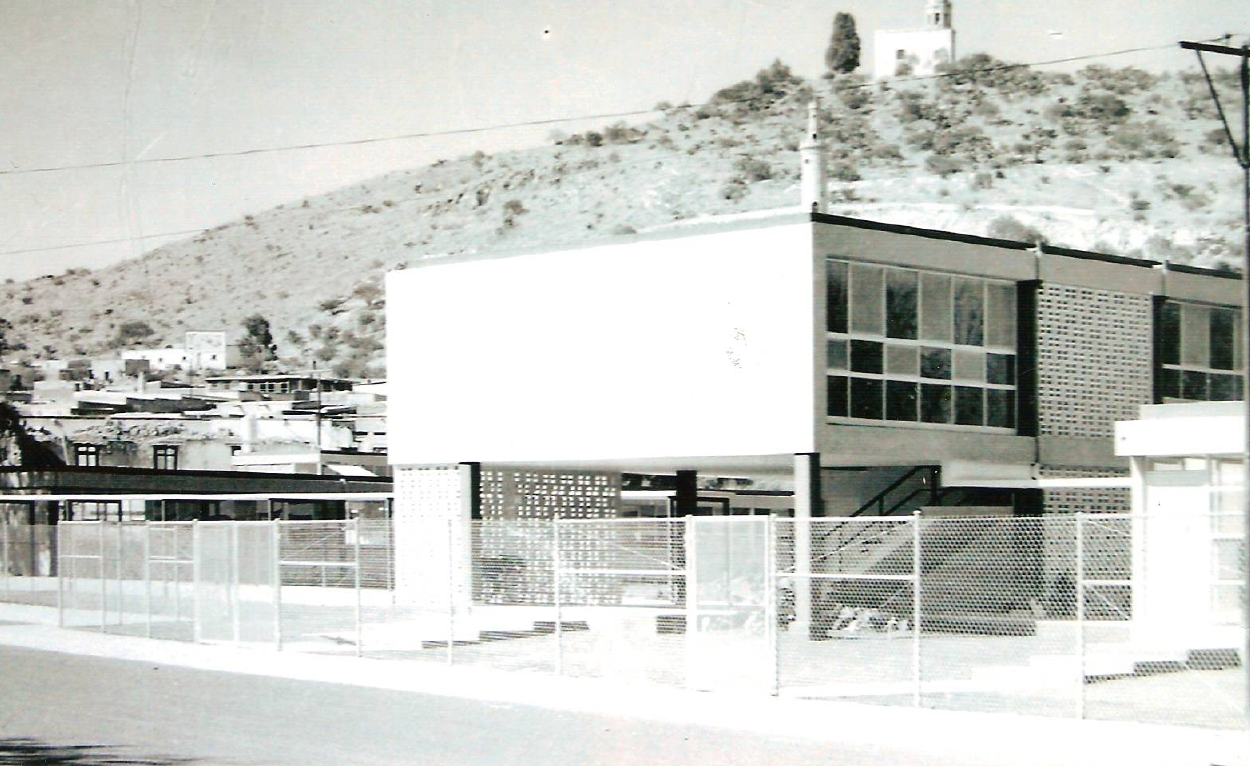
The School of Dentistry opened in 1974 under the direction of Dr. Guillermo Peschard.

In 1938, with the incorporation of Instituto Juárez into the University of Mexico, the school took on the motto of that institution ("Por mi Raza hablará mi espíritu", or The Spirit shall speak for my race), its colors of blue and gold, and its current seal.

In early 1957, the Instituto Juárez only had schools of law, commercial practice, nursing, music and art, and a preparatory school. On March 21, 1957, Governor Francisco González de la Vega, published a decree by which the school became a university, known as Universidad Juárez del Estado de Durango. This decision was made in an attempt to lure and keep faculty, develop a more educated populace in the state, and increase the number of professionals in Durango. UJED added schools in medicine, accounting and administration, and veterinary medicine.

=== Becoming a research university ===
In 1970, research at UJED became a reality with the creation of the Institute for Scientific Research at the school. This institute had academic autonomy which enabled it to exist at a fundamental level in the university.

Since 1988, UJED has been modernized, in response to both increased demand in higher education in the state and the need for the university to increase its role in improving society.

== Media ==
UJED operates a television station in Durango with the callsign XHUJED-TDT, digital channel 48, as well as radio station XHHD-FM 100.5. XHHD previously broadcast on AM as XEHD 1270.

== Notable alumni ==
- Maribel Aguilera Cháirez, politician
- Rodolfo Dorador, politician
- Ismael Hernández, politician and former-Governor of Durango
- Jorge Herrera Caldera, politician and former-Governor of Durango
- Alexandro Martínez Camberos, writer and poet
- Guillermo Peschard, orthodontic dentist and academic
- Jorge Alejandro Salum del Palacio, politician
