= Congress of Durango =

Legislature of Durango, Mexico

Congress of Durango Congreso del Estado de Durango
- LXX Legislature

Type
- Type: Unicameral

Structure
- Seats: 25 diputados
- Political groups: MORENA (10) PRI (7) PAN (5) PVEM (2) MC (1)
- Length of term: 3 years
- Authority: Political Constitution of the Free and Sovereign State of Durango
- Salary: MX$69,655 per month

Elections
- Voting system: 15 with first-past-the-post and 10 with proportional representation
- Last election: 2 June 2024
- Next election: 2027

Meeting place
- Av. 5 de Febrero Ote. 900, Durango, Durango, Mexico

Website
- congresodurango.gob.mx

The Congress of the State of Durango (Spanish: Congreso del Estado de Durango) is the unicameral legislative branch of the government of the Mexican state of Durango. The Congress is the governmental deliberative body of Durango, which is equal to, and independent of, the executive.

The Congress is unicameral and consists of 25 deputies. Deputies are elected to serve for a three-year term.

The Congress convenes in Victoria de Durango, the capital city of the state of Durango.

== See also ==
- List of Mexican state congresses
