= 3rd federal electoral district of Durango =

Federal electoral district of Mexico

Durango's 3rd
- Electoral district of the Chamber of Deputies of Mexico

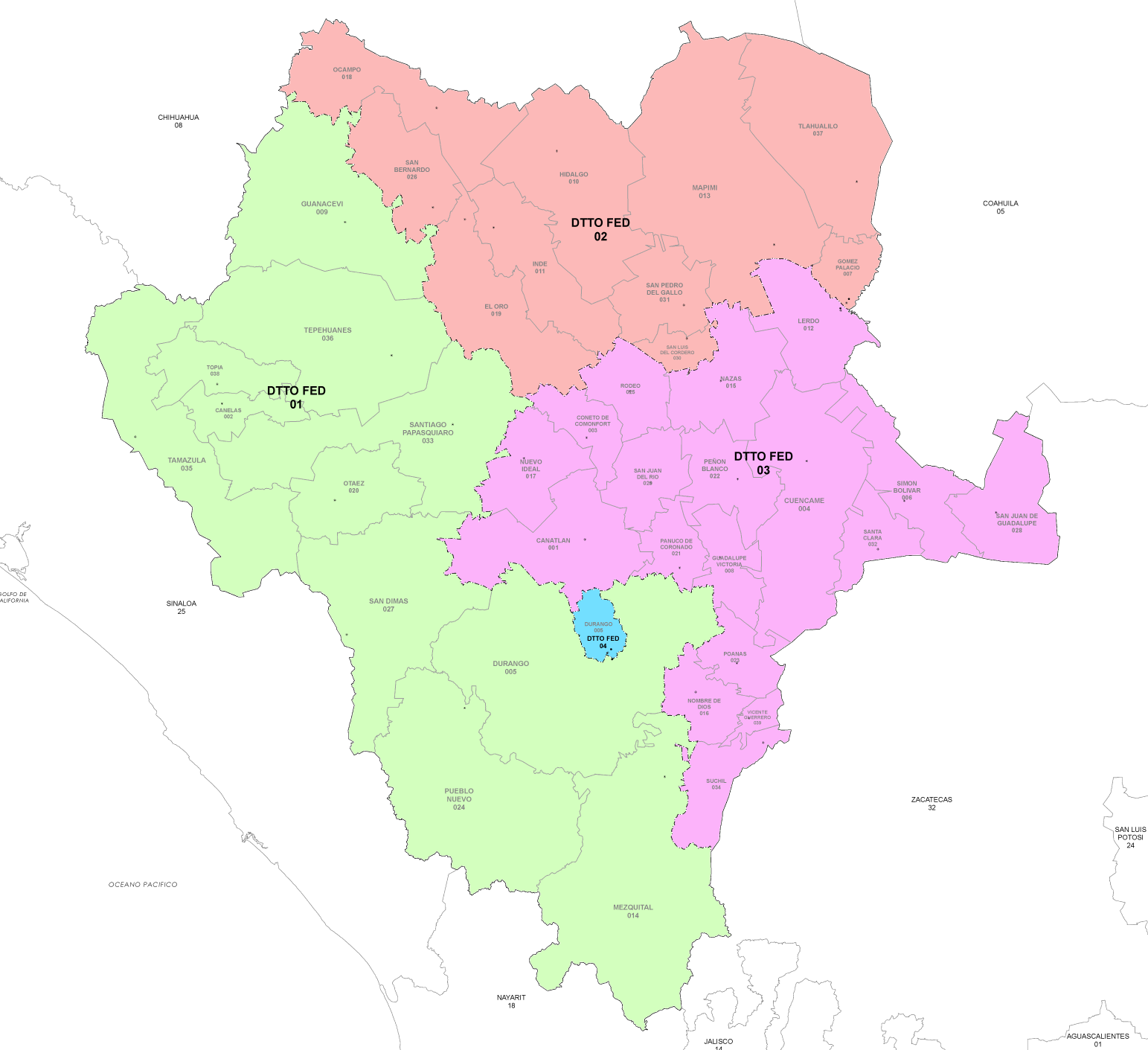
- 3rd district since 2023

Incumbent
- Member: Gerardo Villarreal Solís
- Party: ▌Ecologist Green Party
- Congress: 66th (2024–2027)

District
- State: Durango
- Head town: Ciudad Lerdo
- Coordinates: 25°33′N 103°31′W
- Covers: 18 municipalities: Canatlán, Coneto de Comonfort, Cuencamé, Simón Bolívar, Guadalupe Victoria, Lerdo, Nazas, Nombre de Dios, Nuevo Ideal, Pánuco de Coronado , Peñón Blanco, Poanas, Rodeo, San Juan de Guadalupe, San Juan del Río, Santa Clara, Súchil, Vicente Guerrero
- PR region: First
- Precincts: 414
- Population: 457,050 (2020 census)

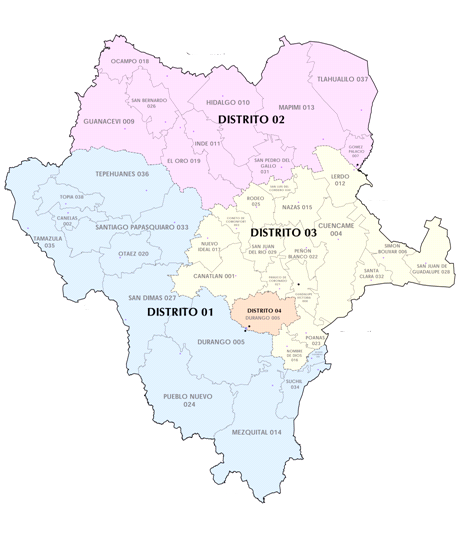
Durango under the 2017–2022 districting plan

The 3rd federal electoral district of Durango (Spanish: Distrito electoral federal 03 de Durango) is one of the 300 electoral districts into which Mexico is divided for elections to the federal Chamber of Deputies and one of four such districts in the state of Durango.

It elects one deputy to the lower house of Congress for each three-year legislative session by means of the first-past-the-post system. Votes cast in the district also count towards the calculation of proportional representation ("plurinominal") deputies elected from the first region.

The current member for the district, elected in the 2024 general election, is Gerardo Villarreal Solís of the Ecologist Green Party of Mexico (PVEM).

== District territory ==
Under the 2023 districting plan adopted by the National Electoral Institute (INE), which is to be used for the 2024, 2027 and 2030 federal elections, the 3rd district covers 414 electoral precincts (secciones electorales) across 18 municipalities in the centre and east of the state:

- Canatlán, Coneto de Comonfort, Cuencamé, Simón Bolívar, Guadalupe Victoria, Lerdo, Nazas, Nombre de Dios, Nuevo Ideal, Pánuco de Coronado , Peñón Blanco, Poanas, Rodeo, San Juan de Guadalupe, San Juan del Río, Santa Clara, Súchil and Vicente Guerrero.

The head town (cabecera distrital), where results from individual polling stations are gathered together and tallied, is the city of Ciudad Lerdo. The district reported a population of 457,050 in the 2020 census.

== Previous districting schemes ==
Evolution of electoral district numbers
	1974	1978	1996	2005	2017	2023
Durango	4	6	5	4	4	4
Chamber of Deputies	196	300				

2017–2022

Between 2017 and 2022, the 3rd district's head town was at Guadalupe Victoria and it covered 17 municipalities in the same region of the state:
- Canatlán, Coneto de Comonfort, Cuencamé, Simón Bolívar, Guadalupe Victoria, Lerdo, Nazas, Nombre de Dios, Nuevo Ideal, Pánuco de Coronado, Peñón Blanco, Poanas, Rodeo, San Juan de Guadalupe, San Juan del Río and Santa Clara, as in the 2023 scheme, but with San Luis del Cordero replacing Súchil and Vicente Guerrero.

2005–2017

Under the 2005 plan, Durango's single-member district count fell from five to four. This district's head town was at Guadalupe Victoria and it covered 25 municipalities in the east of the state:
- Canatlán, Coneto de Comonfort, Cuencamé, Simón Bolívar, Guadalupe Victoria, Hidalgo, Indé, Mapimí, Nazas, Nombre de Dios, Nuevo Ideal, Ocampo, El Oro, Pánuco de Coronado, Peñón Blanco, Poanas, Rodeo, San Bernardo, San Juan de Guadalupe, San Juan del Río, San Luis del Cordero, San Pedro del Gallo, Santa Clara, Tlahualilo, and Vicente Guerrero.

1996–2005

In the 1996 scheme, Durango's seats were reduced from six to five. The 3rd district had its head town at Lerdo and it comprised 14 municipalities:
- Coneto de Comonfort, Cuencamé, Simón Bolívar, Guadalupe Victoria, Lerdo, Nazas, Pánuco de Coronado, Peñón Blanco, Rodeo, San Juan de Guadalupe, San Juan del Río, San Luis del Cordero, San Pedro del Gallo and Santa Clara.

1978–1996

The districting scheme in force from 1978 to 1996 was the result of the 1977 electoral reforms, which increased the number of single-member seats in the Chamber of Deputies from 196 to 300. Under that plan, Durango's seat allocation rose from four to six. The reconfigured 3rd district covered nine municipalities:
- Canatlán (head town), Canelas, Guanaceví, Otáez, San Bernardo, Santiago Papasquiaro, Tamazula, Tepehuanes and Topia.

== Deputies returned to Congress ==
(Mexico) National parties
- Current
- PAN
- PRI
- PT
- PVEM
- MC
- Morena
- PAZ
- Somos
- Defunct or local only
- PLM
- PNR
- PRM
- PNM
- PP
- PPS
- PARM
- PFCRN
- CON
- PANAL
- PSD
- PES
- PES
- PRD

Durango's 3rd district
Election	Deputy	Party	Term	Legislature
1916	Antonio Gutiérrez Rivera		1916–1917	Constituent Congress of Querétaro
1917	Antonio Gutiérrez Rivera		1917–1918	27th Congress
1918	Antonio Gutiérrez Rivera		1918–1920	28th Congress
1920	Salvador Franco Urias		1920–1922	29th Congress
1922	Salvador Franco Urias		1922–1924	30th Congress
1924	Juan Pablo Estrada		1924–1926	31st Congress
1926	Daniel R. Gutiérrez		1926–1928	27th Congress
1928	Daniel R. Gutiérrez		1928–1930	33rd Congress
1930	Lorenzo Gámiz		1930–1932	34th Congress
1932	Fernando Arenas	Institutional Revolutionary Party	1932–1934	35th Congress
1934	Miguel Arrieta Vizcarra		1934–1937	36th Congress
1937	Ernesto Calderón R.	Institutional Revolutionary Party	1937–1940	37th Congress
1940	Braulio Meraz Navárez		1940–1943	38th Congress
1943	Marino Castillo Nájera	Institutional Revolutionary Party	1943–1946	39th Congress
1946	Ramiro Rodríguez Palafox	Institutional Revolutionary Party	1946–1949	40th Congress
1949	Gustavo Durón González	Institutional Revolutionary Party	1949–1952	41st Congress
1952	Ramiro Rodríguez Palafox	Institutional Revolutionary Party	1952–1955	42nd Congress
1955	Juan Pescador Polanco	Popular Socialist Party (Mexico)	1955–1958	43rd Congress
1958	Enrique Wenceslao Sánchez García	Institutional Revolutionary Party	1958–1961	44th Congress
1961	Agustín Ruiz Soto	Institutional Revolutionary Party	1961–1964	45th Congress
1964	Enrique Wenceslao Sánchez García	Institutional Revolutionary Party	1964–1967	46th Congress
1967	Juan Antonio Orozco Fierro	Institutional Revolutionary Party	1967–1970	47th Congress
1970	Francisco Navarro Veloz	Institutional Revolutionary Party	1970–1973	48th Congress
1973	Víctor Rocha Marín	Institutional Revolutionary Party	1973–1976	49th Congress
1976	Salvador Reyes Nevares	Institutional Revolutionary Party	1976–1979	50th Congress
1979	Armando del Castillo Franco	Institutional Revolutionary Party	1979–1982	51st Congress
1982	María Albertina Barbosa Espinoza	Institutional Revolutionary Party	1982–1985	52nd Congress
1985	Francisco Gamboa Herrera	Institutional Revolutionary Party	1985–1988	53rd Congress
1988	Rubén Hernández Higuera	Institutional Revolutionary Party	1988–1991	54th Congress
1991	Francisco Gamboa Herrera	Institutional Revolutionary Party	1991–1994	55th Congress
1994	José Rosas Aispuro	Institutional Revolutionary Party	1994–1997	56th Congress
1997	Juan Arizmendi Hernández	Institutional Revolutionary Party	1997–2000	57th Congress
2000	Olga Margarita Uriarte Rico	Institutional Revolutionary Party	2000–2003	58th Congress
2003	Fernando Adame de León	Institutional Revolutionary Party	2003–2006	59th Congress
2006	José Rubén Escajeda Jiménez	Institutional Revolutionary Party	2006–2009	60th Congress
2009	Óscar García Barrón	Institutional Revolutionary Party	2009–2012	61st Congress
2012	José Rubén Escajeda Jiménez	Institutional Revolutionary Party	2012–2015	62nd Congress
2015	Óscar García Barrón	Institutional Revolutionary Party	2015–2018	63rd Congress
2018	Maribel Aguilera Cháirez	National Regeneration Movement	2018–2021	64th Congress
2021	Maribel Aguilera Cháirez (Note: Aguilera Cháirez resigned her seat in January 2022 to take charge of the federal government's social programmes in Durango.); Martha Alicia Arreola Martínez	National Regeneration Movement	2021–2022; 2022–2023	65th Congress
2024	Gerardo Villarreal Solís	Ecologist Green Party of Mexico	2024–2027	66th Congress

== Presidential elections ==
Durango's 3rd district
Election	District won by	Party or coalition	%
2018	Andrés Manuel López Obrador	Juntos Haremos Historia	46.0915
2024	Claudia Sheinbaum Pardo	Sigamos Haciendo Historia	61.8443
