= Cuencamé =

City in the Mexican state of Durango

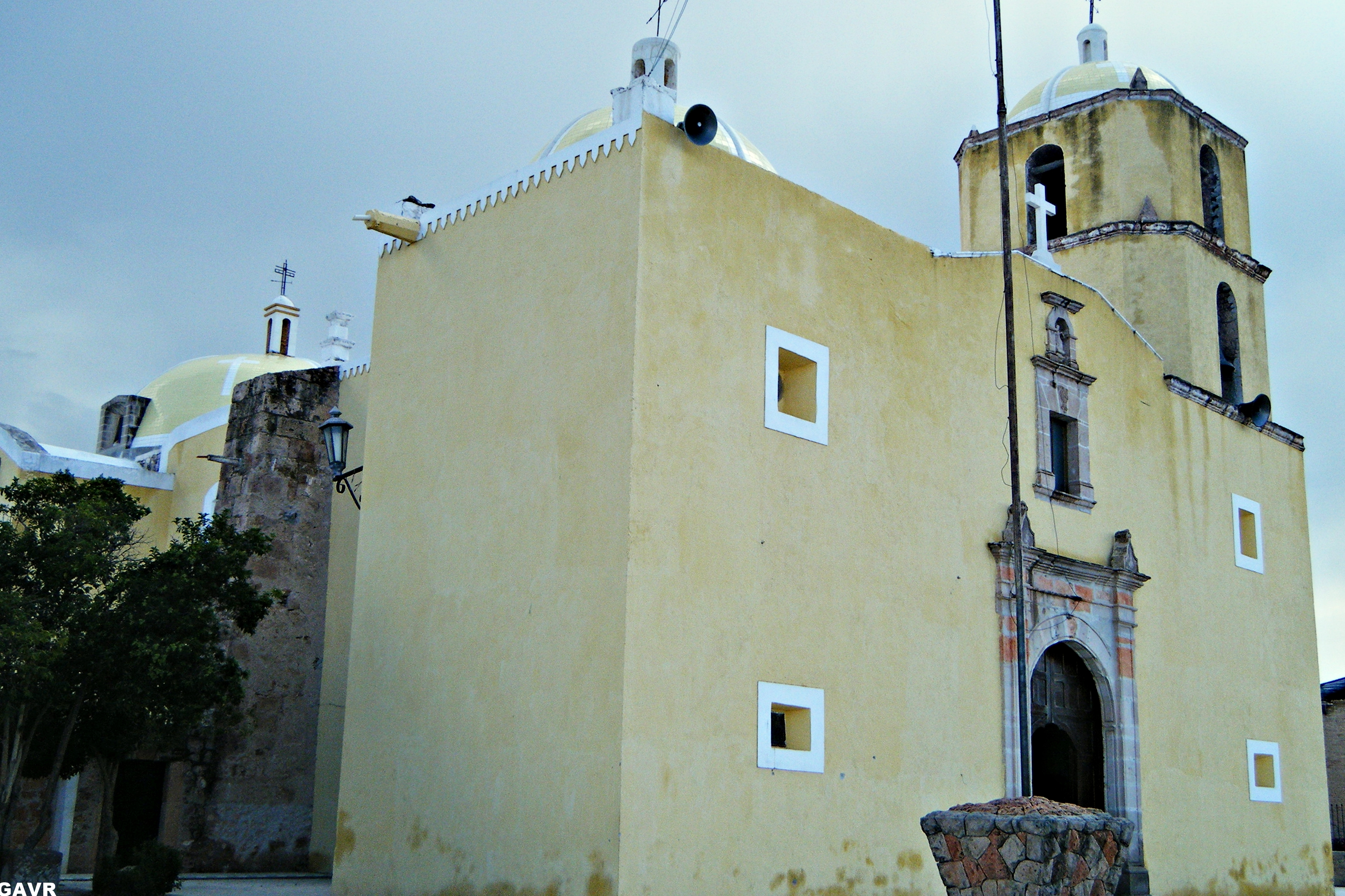
- Templo de Cuencamé

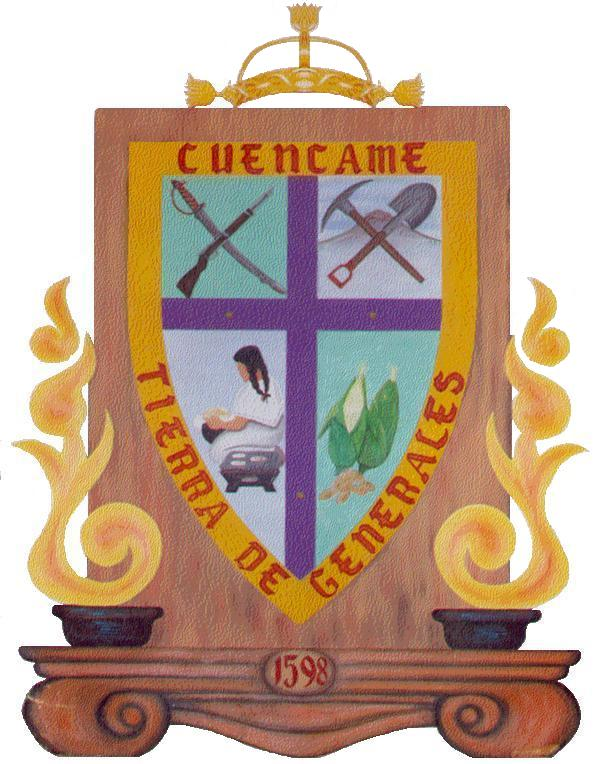
- Coat of arms
- Motto: Tierra de Generales (Land of Generals)
- Location in Mexico
- Coordinates: 24°52′12″N 103°41′45″W
- Country: Mexico
- State: Durango
- Founded: Late 16th century

Government
  - Mayor: Eligio Moreno Martínez
- Elevation: 1,580 m (5,180 ft)

Population (2015)
  - Total: 9,848
  - Demonym: Cuencamense
- Time zone: UTC-6 (Central Standard Time)
- Postal code: 35800 (Center)
- Website: https://www.cuencame.com.mx

Cuencamé is a small city and the seat of the municipality of Cuencamé in the state of Durango, which is in northern Mexico. As of 2015, the city had a total population of 9,848.

== City ==
Cuencamé was originally a very small town formed by adjoining wild northern tribes. During the Colonial period, different groups settled there, such as the Zacatecos, Tepehuanos, and Laguneros. Cuencamé was founded by Jesuit father Francisco Ramírez in August 1594 who founded a mission there 11 years after an original one, built by Franciscan father Jerónimo Panger, had been abandoned. As it was located in the central arid area, it attracted a lot of people interested in the silver mines around Cuencamé.

=== Notable residents ===
At the beginning of the Colonial period, there was a priest named Agustín de Espinoza.

Another Jesuit priest was Jerónimo Ramírez who arrived there in August 1594. A famous monk, Francisco Santos, was in control of the Saint Anthony monastery in Cuencamé. Carlos Michaud, who founded the village of Pedriceña, captain of Pedriza in the Colonial period, also resided here.

During the Mexican revolution period, Calixto Contreras (1867–1918) and Severino Ceniceros (1880–1937) were notable people from Cuencamé. They were born in the borough of Cuencamé.

== The municipality ==
=== History ===
It is “a wide valley around by beautiful mountains according to words of father Jeronimo Ramirez Jesuit priest who came to this place in August 1594. This father was working a lot in this place and he had headed a colonizing project. A letter from Rodrigo de Paz explains that Captain Martin de Zapata arrived to Cuencame and that before him were presented the caciques from Manganapa, Salina and Rio of Nazas they were the ones who took the name of the Captain and they received lands for their settlement. In 1622 it was mentioned that the monastery of Cuencame's Saint Anthony was under control of Friar Francis Santos. Afterward, the name was modified to Purisima Concepción. Maybe to distinguish from others in Durango. The Franciscans arrived at this place in 1583, although it is possible that they abandoned the region at a later time.

This place had a lot of mines in the region. The mine of Terneras caused the installation of the plant property of American Smelting and Refining Company, which exhausted its silver veins.

== Geography ==
=== Location ===
The township is located in the western area of the state. By shape and extension, it is one of the biggest in the state. The limits in the north are the township of Nazas and Lerdo. To the east its limits are the townships of Simon Bolivar and Santa Clara. To the west, it adjoins the townships of Poanas, Guadalupe Victoria and Peñon Blanco. To the south, it limits with the state of Zacatecas. Inside the municipality three is the community of Pedriceña, founded by Carlos Michaud. It is named after Captain Pedroza who distinguished himself during the Colonial epoch. It was nearly considered an independent municipality.

The geographical coordinates are 24° 52’ North latitude and 103°42’ West latitude. The distance from the main capital of the state is 146 km. The height of the township is 1,580 m (5,180 ft) above sea level.

=== Climate ===
The area is semiarid. The ground is flat and surrounded by mountains.

The average temperature is around 21.5 °C. The annual rainfall is 392.1 millimeters.

Climate data for Cuencamé, Durango (1991-2020)
Month	Jan	Feb	Mar	Apr	May	Jun	Jul	Aug	Sep	Oct	Nov	Dec	Year
Record high °C (°F)	36.5 (97.7)	39.0 (102.2)	43.0 (109.4)	41.5 (106.7)	48.0 (118.4)	44.0 (111.2)	41.5 (106.7)	40.0 (104.0)	45.5 (113.9)	40.0 (104.0)	40.5 (104.9)	39.5 (103.1)	48.0 (118.4)
Mean daily maximum °C (°F)	23.5 (74.3)	26.6 (79.9)	29.4 (84.9)	32.5 (90.5)	35.0 (95.0)	34.6 (94.3)	32.5 (90.5)	32.4 (90.3)	30.1 (86.2)	29.3 (84.7)	26.2 (79.2)	23.4 (74.1)	29.6 (85.3)
Daily mean °C (°F)	15.0 (59.0)	17.5 (63.5)	20.0 (68.0)	23.1 (73.6)	25.8 (78.4)	26.3 (79.3)	25.0 (77.0)	24.8 (76.6)	23.0 (73.4)	21.2 (70.2)	17.8 (64.0)	15.2 (59.4)	21.2 (70.2)
Mean daily minimum °C (°F)	6.6 (43.9)	8.4 (47.1)	10.6 (51.1)	13.7 (56.7)	16.7 (62.1)	18.0 (64.4)	17.4 (63.3)	17.2 (63.0)	15.9 (60.6)	13.0 (55.4)	9.5 (49.1)	7.0 (44.6)	12.8 (55.0)
Record low °C (°F)	−9.0 (15.8)	−9.5 (14.9)	−5.0 (23.0)	0.5 (32.9)	7.5 (45.5)	9.5 (49.1)	9.5 (49.1)	8.5 (47.3)	6.5 (43.7)	2.0 (35.6)	−5.0 (23.0)	−7.0 (19.4)	−9.5 (14.9)
Average precipitation mm (inches)	11.7 (0.46)	4.8 (0.19)	8.4 (0.33)	3.7 (0.15)	10.0 (0.39)	52.0 (2.05)	86.9 (3.42)	76.4 (3.01)	88.2 (3.47)	28.3 (1.11)	11.3 (0.44)	5.7 (0.22)	387.4 (15.25)
Average precipitation days (≥ 0.1 mm)	2.8	1.8	1.8	1.8	4.2	9.5	13.8	13.6	11.1	5.0	2.8	1.9	70.1
Average snowy days	0.10	0	0	0	0	0	0	0	0	0	0	0.11	0.21
Source 1: Servicio Meteorológico National
Source 2: Colegio de Postgraduados (snow days)

=== Mountains ===
The San Lorenzo mountains lie to the north of the township. The Huarichic Canyon lies between these mountains. It is used for the main state highway and the Torreón-Coahuila railroad. This mountain lies within the Lerdo township of Sierra Fernández.

The San Lorenzo range is known for its high peaks, such as the San Isidro peak, which serves as a buttress in this chain of the mountains. The Velardeña valley and its rich mineral mines serve as the town limit for the village of the same name. In the northeastern part of the town, a little beyond the San Lorenzo mountains, up the steep and rugged Sierra de Guadalupe that runs parallel to the Sierra de Jimulco, in the Municipality of Simon Bolivar and the state of Coahuila, the two mountain ranges of Guadalupe and Jimulco form a more or less wide canyon where the Aguanaval river and the Central railroad run. This canyon is known as the "Jimulco Canyon."

The Aguanaval River flows into the Nazas River, which is the main river in this area. The surrounding area of these mountains is arid and the Cretaceous formations of the plates and layers of the ground are visible.

=== Rivers, lakes, and springs ===
The main river in this area is the Cuencamé stream. All of the rivers in this area reach the Cuencamé stream. There are many small streams that, in the rainy season, are filled with water. There is another stream near to San Pedro Ocuila named the “Arrieras”.

In recent years many of these streams have decreased substantially. The Cuencamé stream runs into the Nazas River at the point named Rancho de Fernández. In the 1950s two dams were built to keep the mountain water in the area. These dams have helped the agricultural needs in this north area.
