= Guadalupe Victoria (disambiguation) =

Guadalupe Victoria (1786–1843) was the First President of Mexico and a general.

Guadalupe Victoria may also refer to:

== Places ==
- Guadalupe Victoria, Baja California, Mexico
- Guadalupe Victoria, Ascensión Municipality, Chihuahua, Mexico
- Guadalupe Victoria Municipality, Durango, Mexico
- Ciudad Guadalupe Victoria, Durango, Mexico
- Guadalupe Victoria, Puebla, Mexico
- Guadalupe Victoria Municipality, Puebla, Mexico

== Other uses ==
- Guadalupe Victoria (Mexibús), a BRT station in Ecatepec de Morelos, Mexico
- General Guadalupe Victoria International Airport, in Durango
- Guadalupe Victoria, a source of Mexican amber near Simojovel, Chiapas, Mexico
