= Guadalupe Victoria Municipality =

Guadalupe Victoria Municipality may refer to places in Mexico:

- Guadalupe Victoria Municipality, Durango
- Guadalupe Victoria Municipality, Puebla
