= Leopoldo Salazar Viniegra =

Mexican doctor and psychiatrist (1898–1957)

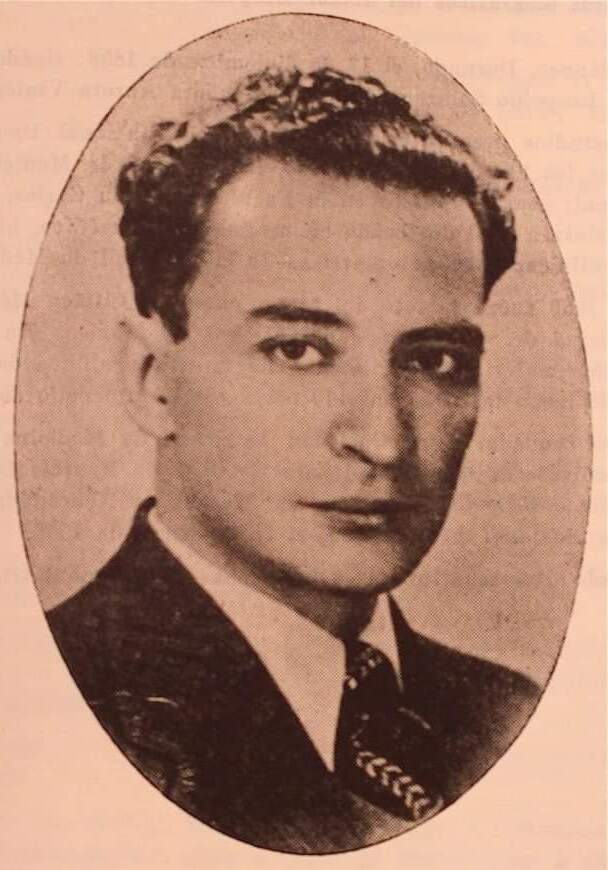
- Salazar, c. 1930
- Born: December 17, 1898; Pánuco de Coronado Municipality or San Juan del Río Municipality, Durango, Mexico
- Died: September 23, 1957 (aged 58); Mexico City, Mexico
- Education: National Autonomous University of Mexico
- Known for: Scientific investigations on cannabis and other psychoactive substances, promoting legalization of psychoactive substances in Mexico
- Scientific career
- Fields: Psychiatry
- Workplaces: La Castañeda

Leopoldo Salazar Viniegra (December 17, 1898 – September 23, 1957) was a Mexican doctor, psychiatrist, writer and professor whose scientific investigations influenced the legalization of drugs during the Lázaro Cárdenas administration in 1940.

It was at La Castañeda, the institution where Salazar worked for more than twenty years, where he led many scientific investigations into the effects of marijuana. These investigations, detailed in his report "El mito de la marihuana" (English: The Myth About Marijuana), helped Salazar launch into the national public discourse the de-stigmatization of drug addiction and its treatment as a disease, not a crime. Due to increasing political and economic pressure from the United States government and a U.S. campaign to discredit Salazar, the law was repealed on July 3, 1940. Salazar dedicated his final years to studying mental health illnesses until his death in 1957 in Mexico City.

== Early life and education ==
Salazar was born in Pánuco de Coronado or San Juan del Río, Durango, in 1898, the son of Leopoldo Salazar Salinas and Aurora Viniegra de Salazar. (Note: In footnote 286 of their thesis, Flores Guevara makes note of the differing accounts of Salazar Viniegra's birthplace in the academic sources they consulted. Both birthplaces are included in this article.) After his elementary studies in Durango, he moved to the capital to begin his university education at the Universidad Nacional Autónoma de Mexico (UNAM). He left for Europe where completed his medical schooling at the Facultad de Medicina de San Carlos in Madrid. For his specialization in psychiatry he studied at the Faculté de médecine in Paris.

== Career ==
In 1925 Salazar returned to Mexico City and began his career as a psychiatrist for Mexico City's Manicomio General La Castañeda (English: General Asylum La Castañeda). In addition to his work at La Castañeda, Salazar held several positions throughout his career with different medical institutions in Mexico City. Starting in 1927, Salazar taught courses on neuropsychiatry and medical clinical studies at the Facultad de Medicina. He also founded the first clinic to treat epilepsy in Mexico. He was in charge of the psychiatric department at the Clínica Londres, and also led a private practice throughout his career. Salazar developed a reputation for his humane and compassionate treatment of patients. He frequently engaged in friendly conversation and shared meals with patients, treating them as friends rather than solely scientific subjects to be studied, which put him at odds with conservative colleagues.

Despite his reputation among his colleagues, Salazar held several important roles in Mexican medical society as the head of the Hospital de Drogadicción de Ciudad de Mexico in 1938 and chief of the Oficina de Toxicomanías y Alcoholismo from 1938 to 1939. He held memberships to the Sociedad de Neurología y Psiquiatría, Consejo de Psiquiatria e Higiene Mental, and the Academia Nacional de Medicina.

Complementing his work as a medical practitioner, Salazar was also a writer. His scientific research findings were published in academic journals, including the journal Manicomios, Gaceta Médica de Mexico, the journal of the Sociedad de Neurología y Psiquiatría de Mexico, and Criminalia, a publication of the Academia en Ciencias Penales. In addition to his research findings, throughout his career, he authored opinion pieces in national newspapers such as El Universal, El Nacional, and Excélsior. He used these outlets to educate and discuss medical topics on a national scale like discussing mental illnesses and differences between drugs.

=== El mito de la marihuana ===
In December 1938, Salazar published a report titled "El mito de la marihuana" (English: The Myth About Marijuana) in the criminal sociology journal Criminalia. In the publication, Salazar presented his scientific findings on the effects of marijuana, dispelling the long held associations between marijuana and madness. At La Castañeda, Salazar carried out multiple experiments that questioned the basis of prejudices held against cannabis, such as insanity, delirium, hallucinations, and criminality, as scientifically unfounded. He focused on the potential use of cannabis to treat maladies such as anxiety, asthma, and rheumatism. He suggested that drug abuse and addiction ought to be treated humanely as an illness or disease, not as a crime, encouraging a combination of education, pharmacological treatment, and psychiatric support. According to a local newspaper, Salazar was the man with the solution to drug addiction in his hands. Salazar believed that by placing the prescription and distribution of drugs under the authority of the government and control of medical professionals, those with drug addiction could receive better medical treatment and run drug traffickers out of business.

=== Open letter to Lola la Chata ===
In March 1938, Salazar published an open letter in El Universal to Lola la Chata, one of the most prominent drug traffickers in Mexico City who operated in the neighborhood of La Merced. Salazar viewed drug traffickers and peddlers as part of a crisis harming Mexican society and straining relations with the United States. In his letter to Lola la Chata, Salazar wrote that she had been more successful with drug abusers than the Mexican government, who were charged with reincorporating them into society. He suggested that her success was due to her talent at exploiting corruption in society among the police force and politicians.

== Impact ==
=== Legalization of drugs ===
Salazar advocated for psychoactive drugs to be discussed from a public health and medical perspective where drug addicts were treated like patients rather than criminals. In a similar vein, he advocated for governmental policies to be based on current scientific knowledge rather than prejudices or economic or political interests. He viewed the prohibitionist laws in place as encouraging the illegal drug trade, corruption of the police force, and criminality of drug users who resorted to crime in order to pay for the high-priced drugs. Salazar's proposed solution was the monopolization of drugs by the state.

Salazar's scientific investigations and writings served as the intellectual foundation for the Reglamento Federal de Toxicomanías (English: Federal Regulation on Drug Addictions), enacted during the Lázaro Cárdenas administration. Signed into law on January 5, 1940, and published in the Diario Oficial de la Federación on February 17, 1940, the law effectively legalized psychoactive drugs and attempted to guarantee medical attention to drug addicts by authorizing medical professionals to prescribe and administer drugs. The government allocated funds to create a special budget for clinics or dispensaries to open up in order to effectively treat patients by administering controlled doses of low-cost, safe, quality drugs. Patients were required to officially register with clinics in order to receive treatment. Around six clinics were set up around Mexico City. Around 200 people—as many as 1,000, according to some estimates—attended the clinics daily.

The law also decriminalized sales and purchases of small quantities of drugs, eliminating former punishments for drug offenses. In addition, drug users jailed for small criminal drug offenses were released.

The state-controlled monopoly on drugs made it so they could provide high quality drugs at a low cost, and much lower and safer than what was sold on the streets of Mexico City at the time. To compare prices, morphine sold at 3.20 pesos a gram at the clinics. The same amount but of poorer, diluted quality was sold on the streets at 45–50 pesos, while it is estimated that a pure gram cost around 500 pesos.

The law was in effect for about 5 months when, on July 3, 1940, the Mexican government repealed the Reglamento in a decree published in the Diario Oficial de la Federación. The formal government explanation attributed this decision to a shortage of resources and the inability to purchase drugs from Europe due to World War II. Not mentioned in the official declaration were the increasing economic and political pressures from the U.S. to repeal the law.

=== U.S. government involvement ===
Salazar's scientific investigations and support for the decriminalization of drug abuse drew the attention of the United States federal government, specifically that of Harry Anslinger, Commissioner of the U.S. Treasury Department's Federal Bureau of Narcotics. Anslinger was a known supporter of the criminalization of all drugs and a staunch advocate for punitive drug punishments, especially marijuana. Documents from the National Archives in Washington, D.C., demonstrate multiple investigations into Salazar were held by several government agencies in the United States including the FBI, the State Department, American Embassy in Mexico, and the U.S. Treasury Department's Federal Bureau of Narcotics.

Documents show the Treasury Department had focused on Salazar as early as August 1938 and that Salazar came to the attention of U.S. Secretary of State Cordell Hull on October 21, 1938, after Salazar sent a discourse to the Mexican Embassy in Switzerland that recommended Mexico defend marijuana at the international level.

The American campaign to discredit Salazar and his investigation began taking shape before the League of Nations Opium Advisory Committee conference in June 1939 in Geneva, where Salazar was scheduled to speak on his narrative about the de-stigmatization of marijuana and other drugs. Days before the conference, Salazar was invited to the American Embassy in Geneva to meet with American diplomatic officials to discuss his ideas. No official reason was given, but Salazar did not speak at the Geneva Conference, returning to Mexico soon after his visit to the Embassy. Months later, Salazar left his post as chief of the Oficina de Toxicomanías y Alcoholismo in 1939.

Despite the United States clear disapproval of the legalization of drugs, Mexico's administration passed the Reglamento Federal de Toxicomanía. As a result, the U.S. invoked the Anti-Smuggling Act of 1935, which amended the Narcotic Drugs Import and Export Act. This allowed the U.S. to establish an embargo on the exportation of narcotics if the U.S. deemed the country's aims neither medical nor scientific. Although the Mexican administration sent diplomats to Washington to discuss the success and efficiency of the new system, the U.S. government maintained their prohibitionist stances and threatened Mexico with economic and political threats of an embargo. In May 1940, the U.S. ceased all exportation of morphine and cocaine to Mexico. Months later, the Reglamento Federal de Toxicomanía was repealed, and Mexico resumed its prohibitionist stance toward drugs and their abuse, reinstating the previously effective illegal status and criminal punishments over rehabilitation.

== Later life ==
Despite the campaign that discredited his medical reputation and the repeal of the Reglamento, Salazar continued his practice as a medical professional. He was director of La Castañeda from 1945 to 1948. He spent his final years investigating mental health illnesses, including funding an institution for youth with a history of delinquency or mental health issues named the Psychopedagogical Guidance Center, or "Casa sin Rejas" (lit. 'house without bars'). In 1957, Salazar died by suicide after investigations into the youth center found irregularities in its financial administration.

== In the media ==
Luis Gerardo Méndez portrayed Salazar in the 2021 podcast Toxicomanía: el experimento mexicano.
