= Ulises Adame de León =

Mexican politician (born 1959)

- Born: Fernanado Ulises Adame de León; 27 June 1959 (age 66); San Juan de Guadalupe, Durango, Mexico
- Occupation: Politician
- Political party: MORENA

Fernando Ulises Adame de León (born 27 June 1959) is a Mexican politician affiliated with the National Regeneration Movement (Morena).

In the 2003 mid-terms he was elected to the Chamber of Deputies to represent the third district of Durango for the Institutional Revolutionary Party (PRI) during the 59th Congress.

In 2017, Adame de León joined Morena. In 2018, he sought to become the rector of the Universidad Autónoma Agraria Antonio Narro.
