= Pepe Jaramillo =

Mexican musician

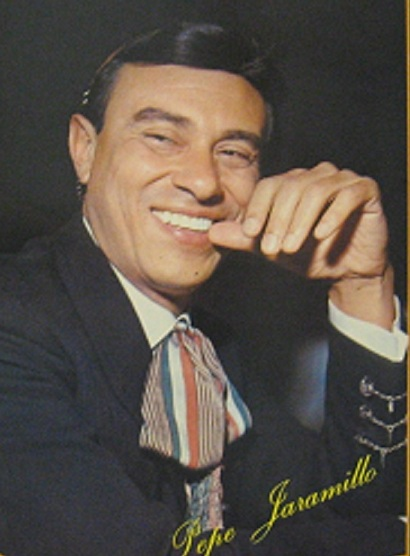
Pepe, @1970

Pepe Jaramillo (born José Jaramillo García; October 27, 1921 – April 30, 2001) was a notable Mexican pianist, composer, arranger, and recording artist. He was most active in London as an EMI recording artist in the 1960s and 1970s. Born in Lerdo, Durango, he began his professional music career playing in night clubs in Mexico City. Relocating to London, England, in his thirties, his many recordings and acclaimed concert appearances brought him international fame. At the age of 79, Jaramillo died of anemia in his sleep at his villa in Andalusia, Spain. Online, and within other sources, Jaramillo has often been confused with an Ecuadorean singer of the same name.

== Biography ==
=== Early life and career in Mexico ===
Both of Jaramillo's parents were originally from the state of Chihuahua, having relocated to Lerdo, Durango, in 1908, the year he was born. Pepe's father was Vicente Baca Jaramillo and his mother was Doña Enriqueta García. He also had a sister and three brothers. Jaramillo's sister's piano-playing inspired the then-four-year-old to teach himself to play the instrument, largely by ear. His family soon arranged for private lessons with a local teacher, and Jaramillo later continued his private lessons with the director of the Mexican Conservatory of Music. In spite of his musical gifts, his family urged him to still have a back-up plan within a more stable profession. Thus, after studying dentistry for a frustrating two years, Jaramillo completed his higher education at the Academia de Negocios de Milton (Milton Business Academy), México City; he also devoted himself to learning English, French, Italian and Portuguese.

Jaramillo was employed for several years under a British mining company operating in the state of Chihuahua. One evening, while visiting the bar of the fashionable Ritz-Carlton in Mexico City, Jaramillo casually began "tinkering" on the grand piano in the hotel lobby for the entertainment of his friends; upon hearing his playing, hotel management promptly offered him a job playing in the Ritz-Carlton's night club. This marked the beginning of Jaramillo's lifelong musical career, during which he focused on the composition, arrangement and performance of various Latin American and Spanish musical styles, including Cuban cha-cha and rumba, boleros, and Brazilian samba, among others.

After a successful three-year term at the Ritz, Jaramillo was subsequently employed by friends who had opened the Quid Grill, a restaurant and bar. In turn, it was these friends' Hollywood actor friends who proved to be instrumental in introducing Jaramillo to the mainstream media, beginning in Mexico City; he also became highly sought after as an accompanist for visiting and touring vocalists and other musicians.

After a 1957 visit to Paris with his cousin (who was employed at the French Mexican embassy), Jaramillo fell in-love with Europe, ultimately deciding to relocate to London. He appeared on a radio series with the BBC called Stairway to the Stars. After answering a call on TV for musicians, Jaramillo sent a recording of some of his earlier Mexican releases to Norman Newell; soon thereafter, his 20-year recording career (spanning 1959–1979) as an EMI artist began.

=== International fame and concert appearances ===
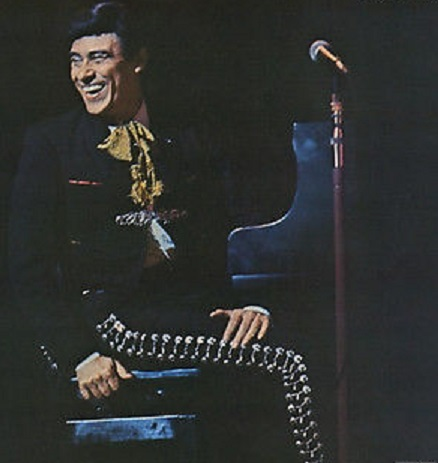
Pepe Jaramillo in concert

As a seasoned professional performer in Mexico, at age 38 Pepe Jaramillo was well prepared to move to the international stage. Through his nightclub and theater performances in some of the world's major cities, he became known as the "Ambassador of México." His performance venues in the Americas included Los Angeles, Harlem, New York City, Miami, Colombia, and Buenos Aires (at Teatro Colón). European performances included (of course) London, Paris (at the Louvre), Madrid at (Plaza Mayor), Germany, the Netherlands, Denmark, and Yugoslavia. During a world tour he performed in many theaters across Japan, (recording several releases there), and also performed in Tangier, Hong Kong (at the Mandarin Hotel), Thailand, and China. During his concert tour in Australia and New Zealand, he also performed with The Seekers. By popular demand, Pepe visited Durban (the Hotel Edward) and Johannesburg (the Dawson Hotel) for three tours of South Africa.

In London, Pepe gave a private performance for the family of the Duchess of Kent. "Also during a visit to London of [the] former President of México, Luis Echeverría, [Pepe was] invited to play at the reception hosted by Her Majesty Queen Elizabeth and the Royal Family.."

Pepe Jaramillo rose to musical prominence during the mid 20th-Century's worldwide interest in Ballroom and Latin American dancing. In 1966, music critic Nigel Hunter explained Pepe Paramillo's appeal thusly: "A large part of Pepe's popularity and achievement undoubtedly lies in the utterly unpretentious simplicity of his style...[His approach] has been vindicated again and again by the impressive sales of his records, and the triumphs of his appearances...Being Mexican, Pepe has the Latin touch innately." Not to be overlooked is the fact that Pepe Jaramillo expanded his repertoire from traditional Latin American songs to one which included Broadway show tunes, music from movie soundtracks, and other popular songs of the day (all arranged to reflect authentic Latin American rhythms). In regard to the popularity of Pepe's authentic dance rhythms among dancers, "Peggy Spencer, the well known British dance teacher and formation team coach, [said] 'You haven't lived if you haven't danced to Pepe Jaramillo.'"

=== Personal life and recognition ===
When he was not working or staying in London, Pepe Jaramillo spent his free time at his villa Las higueras (The Fig Trees) on the Costa del Sol in Spain. He enjoyed swimming, tennis, and painting. Pepe's generous charitable benefits and sponsorships included organizations in his homeland like the Red Cross and the Church of the Sacred Heart of Jesus.

José Jaramillo García was recognized in September 1991 by Lerdo as "Distinguished Citizen." In November 1996, Pepe made another return visit to his hometown, gave several concerts, and donated a piano to the local Casa de la Cultura.

=== Death ===
On April 30, 2001, Pepe Jaramillo died of anemia during sleep at his residence located near the town of Mijas, Malaga province in Andalusia, Spain. His ashes were returned to his family in Mexico.

== Discography ==
Pepe Jaramillo's biographer, José Jesús Vargas Garza, states that Pepe Jaramillo recorded more than 30 LPs, mostly in the UK, but several in Japan, Colombia, and one [new release] in Mexico for Columbia Records...and that the EMI family of labels distributed his music worldwide. The following discography attempts to be complete and includes his LPs, 45 rpm aingles and EPs, and the newer CD releases that feed the continued demand for his music. The first LP section lists seven known albums recorded and released in México by Columbia Records at unknown dates, but certainly previous to 1957. The next LP section chronicles Pepe Jaramillo's history with the EMI family of labels. Pepe Jaramillo is the primary artist with three exceptions, which are noted.

Because all of his recordings "contain only authentic Latin rhythms, they became popular for both listening and dancing," and he frequently recorded under variations of the name "Pepe Jaramillo & His Latin American Rhythms." Geoff Love was long associated with Pepe, and was the most frequent director of the musical accompaniment for Pepe's piano artistry. Geoff Love also arranged many of Pepe's recorded songs. There was a long association with Norman Newell, as the producer for Pepe Jaramillo's releases. With a few exceptions (in Japan and possibly Australia), all of Pepe's releases were recorded in the UK. Pepe Jaramillo composed a number of the songs he recorded on his many releases.

=== Studio albums (LP) México ===
- 195? – Pepe Jaramillo y su Piano, Discos Columbia de México, DCL-90, México (10-inch album)
- 195? – Música de Gonzalo Curiel, Vol. 2, Discos Columbia de México, DCL-114, México
- 195? – Pepe Jaramillo su piano y ritmos, Harmony, HL-8002, México (12-inch album expansion of his earlier Pepe Jaramillo su piano y ritmos)
- 195? – The danzante (The dancer), Discos Columbia de México, HL-8129, México
- 195? – A bailar con sabor latino (To Dance with Latin Flavor), CBS, México (no release number available)

=== Studio albums (LP) EMI ===
With a few exceptions, Pepe Jaramillo recorded LP records in the UK with EMI's Parlophone label from 1959 to 1965. EMI then featured its Columbia Label with the "Studio 2 Stereo" series from 1966 to 1972. From 1973 to 1979 Pepe's releases used the EMI label, still featuring the "Studio 2 Stereo" series. Releases in several countries featured the EMI Odeon label. Eighteen of Pepe Jaramillo's LPs were also released in Australia. In addition to the two Japanese LP recordings listed below, three of his UK releases were also published in Japan. At least nine compilation albums (two CDs) have been published in Japan.

- 1959 – Mexico Tropicale, Parlophone, PMC-1080, UK / Parlophone, PMEO-9434, Australia
- 1959 – Mexico Tropical, Musart D-610, México / and Odeon T-100203, Colombia. (Note: Same tracks as above release, but name changes for Spanish LP & EP releases)
- 1959 – Mexican Magic, Parlophone, PMC-1100, UK / as Parlophone, PMEO-6002, New Zealand / and as (undated) Parlophone, PMC0-7524 (mono), Australia
- 1960 – Mexican Fiesta, Parlophone, PMC-1126 (mono) & PCS-3008 (stereo), UK / on SPMEO-9687, Australia / as Fiesta Mexicana, Odeon T-102229, Colombia / and on King Records, USA (Re-issued in 1973, see below)
- 1960 – South of the Border, Music for Pleasure, MFP-5242, UK & Netherlands / and Axis Records, Axis-6073, Australia Also, remastered and issued as CD in 2014 (see CD section below).
- 1961 – Salud Mexico, Parlophone, PMC-1147 (mono) & PCS-3017 (st.), UK / both mono and stereo versions by Parlophone, Australia / and by Odeon T-100310, Colombia
- 1962 – Mexican on Broadway, Parlophone, PMC-1183 (mono) & PCS-3033 (st.), UK / in both versions by Parlophone, Australia / and in 1971 as Un Mexicano en Broadway, EMI-Odeon, Spain
- 1963 – Mexican Pizza, Parlophone, PMC-1203 (mono) & PCS-3043 (st.), UK / in both versions by Parlophone, Australia / and by Odeon T-100331, Colombia
- 1964 – The Latin World of Pepe Jaramillo, Parlophone, PMC-1231, UK / also as Parlophone, PMC-1231, Australia / and 1n 1965 by Capitol Records, T-6110 (mono), & ST-6110 (stereo), Canada
- 1965 – Pepe at the Movies, Parlophone, PMC-1245 (mono) & PCS-3065 (st.), UK / and in both versions by Parlophone, Australia
- 1965 – A Mexican in the Golden City, Parlophone, PMCO-7523 (mono) & PCSO-7523, Australia. Listed as "Australian LP Series" in reference.) Also released in South Africa.
- 1965 – The Mexican Way, Parlophone, PMC-1253 (mono) & PCS-3069, UK / and in both versions by Parlophone, Australia
- 1966 – Pepe on the Continent, Columbia, Studio 2 Stereo TWO-122, & SX-6036 (mono), UK / World Record Club SLZ-8103, New Zealand
- 1966 – Carnival in Mexico, Columbia, Studio 2 Stereo TWO-147, & SX-6111 (mono), UK / Columbia SMC-74230, Germany
- 1967 – Moonlight in Mexico, Columbia, Studio 2 Stereo TWO-182, & SX-6188 (mono), UK / by Columbia, 7826 (mono) in Australia. The Australian stereo version album was issued with a different front cover as The Sweetest Sounds, Columbia, Stereo SOEX-9082, LP, Australia Moonlight in Mexico was issued in 1982 by Odeon OP-8277, Japan.
- 1968 – Mexicana Holiday, Columbia, Studio 2 Stereo TWO-206, UK / as EMI-7880 in Australia / and by Tai Shen KT-3086, Taiwan
- 1969 – Mexican Champagne, Columbia, Studio 2 Stereo TWO-255, UK
- 1969 – Latin Piano in Japan, Columbia, Studio 2 Stereo TWO-291,: also released in NZ under same number; also released in Japan by Odeon OP-8679
- 1970 – Claude Ciari, Guitar & Pepe Jaramillo, Piano – Deluxe in Guitar & Piano, Odeon OKB-001, Released in Japan by Toshiba. (2 Obi releases: No. 1 in Deluxe Mood Series, & with Expo 70 Obi)
- 1970 – Piano Latin Rhythm, Odeon, KJ-7006, LP, Japan
- 1970 – Till There Was You, Columbia, Studio 2 Stereo TWO-307, UK / Columbia, Studio 2 Stereo TWO-397, New Zealand / & Columbia, C 062-04487, LP, Italy.
- 1971 – Tequila Cocktail, Columbia, Studio 2 Stereo TWO-339, UK / Telemark Dance Records S-6399, USA
- 1971 – Pepe Jaramillo / Manuel & His Music of the Mountains, Manuel Meets Pape Jaramillo / Pepe Jaramillo Meets Manuel, Columbia, Studio 2 Stereo TWO-359, / and by Columbia, Studio 2 Quadrophonic Q4 TWO-359, / and by EMI Starline, UK
- 1972 – Mexican Love, Columbia, Studio 2 Stereo TWO-366, UK / and by Columbia, SOEX-10415, Australia
- 1973 – Mexican Mirage, EMI, Studio 2 Stereo TWO-411, UK
- 1973 – Mexican Fiesta, Parlophone, SPMEO-10142 (st.), Australia (Re-issue of 1960 release, see above.)
- 1973 – Mexican Voodoo, EMI, Studio 2 Stereo TWOX-1011, UK / and EMI EMS-80080, Japan
- 1974 – Pepe and the Tijuana Sound, EMI, Studio 2 Stereo TWOX-1012, UK
- 1974 – Mexican Tijuana, EMI, Studio 2 Stereo TWOX-1031, UK / and in 1975 in Spain
- 1975 – Mexican Gold, EMI, Studio 2 Stereo TWOX-1047, UK / and EMI Music Malaysia, Malaysia
- 1977 – Down Mexico Way, EMI, Studio 2 Stereo TWOX-1067, UK / and Embassy Records Studio 2 Stereo TWOX-1067, Israel
- 1979 – Just For You, EMI One Up OU-2224, UK

=== Compilation albums (LP) ===
Nine albums of Pepe Jaramillo's songs have been released on LP in Japan. No release dates are available... possibly due to translation problems.

- 196? – Sudamericana, Odeon 0-83265, LP, Germany
- 196? – Mexicana, Odeon 0-83312, LP, Germany
- 1965 – The Latin World of Pepe Jaramillo, Odeon, OP-7229, LP, Japan (A compilation: Not the same tracks as 1964 release)
- 1965 – The Romantic World of Pepe Jaramillo, Capitol Records T-6136 (mono), ST-6136 (stereo), Canada
- 1966 – Panamericana, Odeon 0-83406, LP, Germany
- 1967 – Latin Deluxe, Odeon, OP-8010, LP, Japan
- 1970 – The Music of Mexico, Columbia 3C 062-04298, LP, Italy.
- 1970 – Latin Piano, Odeon EOP-97005, Japan.
- 1970 – Pepe Jaramillo, su piano y ritmos, CBS, YS-464-C, Stereo LP, Japan
- 1973 – This Is Pepe Jaramillo, EMI, Studio 2 Stereo EMSS-3, LP Sampler, UK / and EMI, Studio 2 Stereo, SPMEO-10142, Australia
- 1976 – Golden Double 32, EMI, EMS-65031-32, 2xLP, Japan
- 1977 – Carioca, EMI Italiana, 3C 062-07041, LP, Italy
- 1982 – Romantic Rhythms, Music for Pleasure, MFP-55016, 2xLP, UK
- 1986 – An Evening With Pepe Jaramillo, EMI, EMS-1091, 2xLP, UK / Also published in 1988 by budget label Music for Pleasure, DL-1090.
- n.d. – Best 20, EMI, EMS-90038, LP, Japan
- n.d. – Latin Fiesta, Angel Records, ASP-1002, LP, Japan
- n.d. – Magic Latin, Angel Records, HV-1049, LP, Japan
- n.d. – The Breeze and I, Odeon, OW-6064, LP, Japan

=== Compilation albums (CD) ===
Although several CDs were released during Pepe's lifetime, all of the albums in this section are composed of previously recorded tracks. One 2011 release is digital version of 1959 EP.

- 1988 – Best Now, EMI, CP32-9038, CD, Japan
- 1997 – Shoji Yokoughi, Pepe Jaramillo, & Claude Ciari – Mr Guitar & Friends, by WRD Music, WRCD-5019, UK (CD)
- 1999 – Mexican Tijuana / Mexican Gold, EMI Digital/Parlaphone, CD #0724349613557, UK
- 2001 – Pepe Jaramillo, EMI, The CD Club #0467900101S, Japan
- 2006 – Moonlight in Mexico / Pepe Meets Manuel, EMI Vocation, CD #4036, UK
- 2011 – Cafe Bolero, Vintage Music No. 286, CD
- 2011 – Latin American Rhythm, Vintage Music, CD (misspelled "Rithm" in ads)
- 2011 – Majia Mexicana, Vintage Music No.146, CD
- 2011 – Mexico Tropical, Vintage Music No.141, CD (from EP)
- 2012 – Salud Pepe, Jasmine Music, CD #604988019322
- 2012 – Holidays in Italy, Vintage Music, CD (same track listing as Mexican Pizza)
- 2014 – The Latin Piano, Vintage Music, CD
- 2014 – Al sur de la frontera, Fonotron-Efen Records, CD EFE-1330, Spain (Not a compilation. Re-mastered and re-released edition of 1960 LP, South of the Border.)
- 2014 – Latin World: Piano & Coffee, Vintage Music, CD

=== Singles (45rpm) ===
- 1960 – "Fruit Salad" / "Ring Ding" – Parlophone R-4666, UK
- 1962 – "Maria" / "The Surrey With the Fringe on Top" – Parlophone R-4965, UK
- 1962 – "Adios" / "Sway" – Odeon 0-22-125, Germany
- 1964 – "The Little Sparrow of Paris" / "The Love of My Life" – Parlophone R-5196, UK / and Parlophone R-5196, India
- 1968 – "Mexico, Mexico, Mexico" / "Mexican Champagne" – Columbia DB-8467, UK
- 19?? – "Hernando's Hideaway" / "Hey There" – Odeon 006-04183, France

=== Extended Play (EP) ===
The first release listed here was noted by Pepe Jaramillo's biographer as his "very first" recording. Certainly Mexico, prior to 1957, and possibly Disco Columbia de México.

- 195? – "Calla Tristeza" / "Incertidumbre" / "Dime" / "Sueño" – Unknown Label, México
- 1959 – Mexico Tropical, Odeon DSOE-16.305, Spain (from 1959 LP)
- 1960 – Majia Mexicana, Odeon DSOE 16.346, Spain
- 1962 – Mexico Tropicale, Parlophone EPEG-1001, India (from 1959 LP)
- 1962 – Latin American Cha Cha Cha, Parlophone GEP-8867, UK
- 1963 – Latin American Cha Cha Cha, Parlophone GEPO-8867, Australia
- 1963 – Latin American Rhythms, Parlophone GEP-8881, UK
- 1964 – Latin American Rhythms, Parlophone GEPO-8881, Australia
- 1964 – Pepe in Italy, Parlophone GEP-8919, UK / and Parlophone GEPO-8919, Australia
- 1964 – Latin American Beguines, Parlophone GEP-8896, UK / and Parlophone GEPO-8896, Australia
- 1965 – The Latin World of Pepe Jaramillo, Parlophone GEP-8944, UK / and Parlophone GEPO-8944, Australia
- 1965 – The Mexican Way, Parlophone, UK
- 1968 – Mexican Pizza, Odeon OP-4001, Japan
- 1983 – Rumbas / Cha Cha Chas, International Dance Teachers Association IDTA-59, UK
- 1983 – Sambas / Rumbas, International Dance Teachers Association IDTA-60, UK
- 1983 – Cha Cha Chas, International Dance Teachers Association IDTA-61, UK
- 1983 – Rumbas / Cha Cha Chas, International Dance Teachers Association IDTA-62, UK

== See also ==
- List of EMI artists
