= Óscar García Barrón =

Mexican politician

- Born: 27 June 1959 (age 67); San Bernardo, Durango, Mexico
- Occupation: Politician
- Political party: Institutional Revolutionary Party

Óscar García Barrón (born 27 June 1959) is a Mexican politician from the Institutional Revolutionary Party (PRI). He served as a federal deputy in the 61st Congress and 63rd Congress, representing Durango's 3rd district on both occasions.

== Life ==
After serving as an elementary and middle school teacher in the 1970s and 1980s, García Barrón broke into the PRI in the 1980s. He served on the town council of Ocampo, Durango, between 1986 and 1989, representing the PRI in the town's electoral council and serving in the local PRI organization. In 1992, he became municipal president of Ocampo for a three-year term. In 1997, he served as a municipal political councilor in Ocampo and as an electoral coordinator for the state PRI in several municipalities.

From 1998 to 2001 and then from 2004 to 2007, García Barrón served in the Congress of Durango, in its LXI and LXIII legislatures. In the LXI Legislature, he served as president of the Agrarian Reform Commission. In between his two stints in the state legislature, he was the municipal president of San Bernardo, his birthplace, for a three-year term. From 2005 to 2008, he served as a state- and national-level political councilor for the PRI, and between 2006 and 2010, he presided over the state chapter of the Confederación Nacional Campesina. Additional positions in which García Barrón has served include president of the Durango League of Agrarian Communities.

In 2009, García became a federal legislator for the first time when voters in Durango's third district sent him to the Chamber of Deputies for the 61st session of Congress. He presided over the Agrarian Reform Commission in that legislature, and he also served on two committees: Farming and Ranching, and Special for Ranching. In 2011, he became the national Secretary of Action for the CNC, and after the 61st Congress concluded, he became an alternate senator for Durango. In 2008, he founded and became president of the Durango Union of Ranchers in the Social Sector, a union of 32 ranchers' associations which has 22,000 members throughout the state.

Voters in the third district of Durango, based in Guadalupe Victoria, sent García Barrón back to the Chamber of Deputies in 2015. He serves on three commissions: Ranching, Agrarian Reform, and Agriculture and Irrigation Systems, as well as the Committee for the Center for Studies for Sustainable Rural Development and Food Sovereignty.
