= Peñón Blanco =

Peñón Blanco ("white stone" in Spanish) may refer to:

- Peñón Blanco, Durango, a municipality in Durango state of Mexico
- Salinas de Peñón Blanco, also known as Salinas de Hidalgo, a town in San Luis Potosí state, Mexico
- Penon Blanco Peak, near Coulterville, California, US
