= José Rubén Escajeda =

Mexican politician

- Born: 11 March 1960 (age 66); Durango, Mexico
- Occupation: Deputy
- Political party: PRI

José Rubén Escajeda Jiménez (born 11 March 1960) is a Mexican politician affiliated with the Institutional Revolutionary Party (PRI). In the 2006 general election he was elected to the Chamber of Deputies to represent the third district of Durango. Voters returned him to the same seat in the 2012 general election.

Previously, he served as municipal president of San Juan del Río, Durango, from 1992 to 1995 and as a member of the Congress of Durango from 1995 to 1998.
