= San Juan del Río Municipality =

San Juan del Río Municipality may refer to:

- San Juan del Río Municipality, Durango
- San Juan del Río Municipality, Querétaro
