= List of EMI artists =

The musicians may have been signed under one of EMI's subsidiary labels. The subsidiary is noted next to the artist if this is the case.

== Popular ==
=== Pre-1960 ===
- Nat King Cole (Capitol)
- Tennessee Ernie Ford (Capitol)
- Judy Garland (Capitol)
- Nicolai Gedda (HMV)
- The Goons (Parlophone)
- Wanda Jackson (Capitol)
- Dick James (Parlophone)
- The Kingston Trio (Capitol)
- Umm Kulthum (EMI Arabia)
- Dean Martin (Capitol)
- Liza Minnelli (Capitol/Angel)
- Cliff Richard (Columbia Graphophone)
- Jimmy Shand (Parlophone)
- Dinah Shore (Capitol)
- Frank Sinatra
- Gene Vincent (Capitol)

=== 1960s ===
- The Band (Capitol)
- The Beach Boys (Capitol)
- The Beatles (Parlophone/EMI/Capitol/Apple). Now bought by Universal.
- Bobby Darin (Capitol)
- Gerry and the Pacemakers (Columbia Gramophone)
- The Animals (Columbia Graphophone, left in 1966)
- The Yardbirds (Columbia Gramophone)
- The Hollies (Parlophone/EMI, 1963–1972, 1986–Present)
- Gullivers People (Parlophone/EMI, 1965–1969)
- Pink Floyd (Tower/Harvest/EMI/Capitol/Columbia Gramophone)
- The Pretty Things (Harvest/Columbia Gramophone, 1968–1972)
- Deep Purple (Parlophone/Purple/Harvest, left in 1976; EMI for Japan and Europe outside UK, 1997–2003)
- Cilla Black (Parlophone)
- Pepe Jaramillo (Parlophone, EMI)
- Billy J. Kramer (Parlophone)
- The Fourmost (Parlophone)
- The Shadows (Columbia Gramophone/EMI, left in 1980)
- Herman's Hermits (Columbia Gramophone)
- The Dave Clark Five (Columbia Gramophone)
- Ahmad Zahir (Capitol, EMI)
- Helen Shapiro (Columbia Gramophone)
- Manfred Mann (HMV, left in 1966)
- The Move (Regal Zonophone)
- Procol Harum (Regal Zonophone, left in 1970)
- T. Rex (band) (Regal Zonophone)
- Joe Cocker (Regal Zonophone/EMI, 1968–1970, 1999–2007)
- Peter and Gordon (Columbia Gramophone/Capitol)
- The Swallows (Malaysian Band) (Columbia)

=== 1970s–present ===
- 22-20s (Heavenly)
- Thirty Seconds to Mars
- Air Traffic (Tiny Consumer)
- Ai (EMI Records/EMI Records Japan/EMI Music Japan)
- Airbourne
- Aleesia (EMI/A-Lista)
- Alfie (Regal)
- All-4-One
- Andy Lau (1985 - 1989 moved to PolyGram Hong Kong in 1990)
- Ahmad Zahir
- Ilham al-Madfai
- Lily Allen (Regal/Parlophone/Capitol)
- Alpha Galates
- A-mei (EMI Music Taiwan)
- Namie Amuro (EMI Music Japan, left in 1995)
- Anahí
- Leif Ove Andsnes
- Angelic Upstarts (EMI Zonophone)
- Keren Ann
- Michael Fortunati (EMI Italiana, dropped in 1995)
- Jack Jersey (EMI Netherlands) (Capitol Records)
- Anouk (EMI Netherlands)
- Adam Ant
- AFI
- Alison Wonderland
- Armored Saint
- Arrows (RAK Records)
- Art Brut (Mute)
- Richard Ashcroft (Hut/Virgin/EMI/Parlophone)
- Assala
- Athlete (Regal)
- Auf der Maur
- Australian Crawl
- Avant
- Avion (EMI Australia)
- Charles Aznavour
- Melanie B (Virgin, dropped in 2001)
- Lloyd Banks (G-Unit/EMI)
- Barenaked Ladies
- Bassheads (Parlophone/Deconstruction, dropped in 2003)
- The Barracudas
- Beastie Boys (Parlophone/Capitol)
- Beau Dommage (Capitol)
- Bebe
- Victoria Beckham (Virgin, dropped in 2002)
- Belinda (Capitol)
- Belouis Some (Parlophone/Capitol)
- The Beta Band (Regal)
- BlaaZe (Virgin)
- Black Dice (DFA Records)
- Black Rebel Motorcycle Club (Virgin, left in 2004)
- Black Sabbath (I.R.S./EMI, 1989–1996)
- Blue (Innocent/Virgin)
- Blue Mink (Regal Zonophone)
- Blur (Food/Parlophone)
- David Bowie (Parlophone/Virgin)
- Jeff Bridges (EMI/Blue Note)
- Lisa Brokop (Capitol, left in 1996)
- Garth Brooks (Capitol/Liberty/Parlophone)
- Meredith Brooks (Capitol, left in 1999)
- Brotherhood of Man (1982–83)
- James Brown
- Emma Bunton (Virgin, dropped in 2002)
- Burning Spear
- Kate Bush
- Melanie C (Virgin, dropped in 2003)
- John Cale
- Camper Van Beethoven (Virgin America)
- Captain (EMI Records)
- Cass Phang (EMI Music Hong Kong)
- Crookers
- Mariah Carey (Virgin, 2001–2002)
- Belinda Carlisle (Virgin, 1993 & 1996)
- Kim Carnes
- Carpark North
- Hayko Cepkin (EMI Turkey/Kent)
- The Chemical Brothers (Virgin)
- Chiddy Bang (Parlophone)
- Chingy (Parlophone/Capitol, left in 2007)
- Chumbawamba (EMI)
- Anne Clark (EMI UK) 1982-1994
- Classics IV
- Claytown Troupe (EMI USA/UK) 1991–1992
- George Clinton
- Joe Cocker (Parlophone)
- Cockney Rejects (EMI & EMI Zonophone)
- Coldplay (Parlophone/Capitol)
- Phil Collins
- Conor Maynard (Parlophone)
- The Colour (Rethink)
- The Concretes (Astralwerks)
- Elvis Costello
- Graham Coxon (Parlophone)
- DJ Crazy Toones (Lench Mob Records)
- Creamy (EMI Music Denmark)
- Crowded House (Capitol)
- Myriam Montemayor Cruz
- Daft Punk (Virgin)
- The Dandy Warhols (Parlophone/Capitol)
- The Decemberists (Capitol)
- Delirious? (Sparrow)
- The Departure (Parlophone)
- Depeche Mode (Mute, Capitol/Virgin US until 2012)
- Design (Regal Zonophone/EMI)
- Device (Chrysalis)
- Dewa 19 (EMI Music Hong Kong/Indonesia/Arka Music)
- Ahmad Dhani (EMI/Arka Music Indonesia)
- Dirty Vegas (Parlophone)
- The Divine Comedy (Parlophone)
- Doves (Heavenly)
- Dubstar (Food)
- The Duke Spirit (Heavenly)
- Duran Duran (Harvest/Capitol/EMI)
- Sheena Easton
- Anthonia Edwards
- Taron Egerton
- The Elkcloner
- Electric Light Orchestra (Harvest, left in 1973)
- Eloy (Harvest/Electrola/EMI, left in 1984)
- Elva Hsiao (Virgin Music Taiwan/EMI Music Taiwan)
- Shawn Emanuel (EMI Music, left in 2007)
- Empire (Parlophone)
- Enigma (Virgin)
- Erasure (Mute)
- Eric Johnson (Vortexan)
- Eternal (left in 2000)
- Euphoria (EMI Australia)
- Exaltasamba
- Faith Evans (Capitol)
- Evanescence (Wind-Up Records)
- Everclear (Capitol, left in 2004)
- Exodus (Capitol)
- Faker (Capitol)
- Falco
- Fairuz (EMI Arabia)
- Fatboy Slim (Astralwerks)
- Kevin Federline (Federation Records)
- Tiziano Ferro (EMI Music Italy)
- Fey (EMI Music/Capitol)
- Neil Finn (Parlophone)
- Fischerspooner
- Five Finger Death Punch
- The Flowers (EMI Music China)
- Foo Fighters (Roswell/Parlophone/Capitol, left in 1999)
- Michael Franti and Spearhead (Parlophone)
- The J. Geils Band
- The Generators (Orlando, Florida version)
- Debbie Gibson (SBK, 1995, left after one album)
- David Gilmour (EMI/Columbia)
- Gary Glitter
- Goldfrapp (Mute)
- Diego González
- Gorillaz (Parlophone)
- Edyta Górniak (from 1996, moved to Virgin in 2002, dropped in 2004)
- Grand Avenue
- Grand Funk Railroad (Capitol)
- Amy Grant (Sparrow/EMI/Capitol Christian Group, signed in 2007 after leaving Warner/Word/Curb)
- Great White (Capitol)
- David Guetta (Astralwerks)
- G-Unit (G-Unit/EMI)
- Adrian Gurvitz (RAK)
- Geri Halliwell (Capitol/Virgin/Innocent, contract finished in 2005)
- Ed Harcourt (Heavenly)
- Steve Harley & Cockney Rebel (now part of Parlophone; catalogue moved to Chrysalis)
- George Harrison (Parlophone/Apple)
- Corey Hart (Capitol/EMI America/Manhattan) (outside Canada)
- Nazia Hassan
- Zohaib Hassan
- Mike Hawkins (Virgin / EMI DK)
- Richard Hawley (Mute)
- Oliver Haze
- Heart (Capitol)
- Heroes del Silencio
- Honey Bane (Zonophone)
- Jake Hook (EMI Music Publishing)
- Hot Chip
- Hot Chocolate (RAK)
- Houston (singer) (Capitol)
- Stanley Huang (Virgin Music Chinese/Capitol Music Taiwan)
- Hurt
- Ice Cube (Lench Mob Records)
- Idlewild (Parlophone, left in 2005)
- Interpol (Capitol/Parlophone, UK)
- Iron Maiden (EMI, Harvest/Capitol US 1980–1990, 1993–1995, currently on Universal Music Group in North America)
- Alan Jackson (EMI Nashville)
- Janet Jackson (Virgin, completed contract and left in 2006)
- Jay Chou (Virgin)
- Jaguares (EMI)
- Jessica Simpson (Primary Wave)
- Mulan Jameela (EMI Music Indonesia)
- Duncan James (Innocent/Virgin)
- Jane's Addiction (Parlophone/Capitol)
- Matthew Jay
- Pepe Jaramillo (EMI)
- Jean Michel Jarre (from August 2007 until 2012)
- Dr. John (Parlophone)
- Norah Jones (Parlophone/Blue Note/Capitol)
- Junior Senior
- Junoon
- Kajagoogoo (Parlophone)
- Laura Michelle Kelly (Angel)
- Kenna
- Nusrat Fateh Ali Khan (Real World)
- King Biscuit Time (Regal)
- Kings of Convenience
- The Knack (Capitol)
- Beverley Knight (Parlophone)
- Jordan Knight
- Korn (Virgin, left and are now independent)
- Kraftwerk (EMI/Capitol since 1975, Astralwerks US as of 2001; Mute Europe as of 2009)
- Leo Ku (Gold Label)
- Kudai (Capitol)
- Kyla (EMI Philippines)
- Lady Antebellum (Capitol Nashville)
- Cristy Lane
- Marit Larsen (Virgin, former M2M)
- David Lasley
- LCD Soundsystem
- Legião Urbana
- John Lennon (Parlophone/Apple)
- LeToya (Noontime/Capitol)
- Huey Lewis and the News (Chrysalis Records)
- Libera
- Little River Band (EMI Australia/Harvest, then Capitol; until 1986)
- Alex Lloyd (left in 2004)
- Justin Lo (Gold Label)
- Loane (Virgin/EMI Music France)
- Lollipop (EMI Capitol Taiwan)
- Los Mismos (left in 2001)
- Ruth Lorenzo (EMI/Virgin, May 2009)
- Louise (left in December 2001)
- Love is All (Parlophone, one album)
- M2M (under negotiation for a reunion album)
- Madredeus
- Mae (Capitol)
- The Magic Numbers (Heavenly)
- Maids of Gravity (Virgin/Vernon Yard)
- Die Mannequin
- Manowar (left after two weeks)
- Marillion
- Marinella
- Lene Marlin (Virgin)
- Richard Marx (EMI USA/Manhattan/Capitol)
- Willy Mason (Astralwerks)
- Abraham Mateo (EMI Spain)
- Keiko Matsui (Narada)
- Paul McCartney (Parlophone/Capitol/Apple). Left in 2007. Owns solo back catalogue rights, which were licensed to Concord Music Group in 2010 and transferred to Capitol in 2016.
- McFly (Super)
- Megadeth (Capitol)
- Meat Loaf (Virgin Records) One album: Bat Out of Hell III: The Monster Is Loose
- Memorain (EMI Greece, contract finished in 2010)
- George Michael (Virgin) 1996–1999. Owned solo back catalogue rights from that time, which were licensed to Sony Music Entertainment in 2008.
- Michael Learns to Rock (EMI Denmark/Medley)
- Mina
- Kylie Minogue (Parlophone)
- Mandy Moore (The Firm Music)
- Morrissey (His Master's Voice/Parlophone)
- Bob Mould (Virgin)
- Mud (RAK)
- Róisín Murphy
- The Music (Hut)
- Na Ying
- Naast
- Naked Eyes (Parlophone/EMI America)
- Kary Ng (Gold Label)
- Nickelback (Canada only)
- Martin Nievera (EMI Philippines)
- Nine Times Bodyweight
- O'G3NE (EMI Netherlands)
- Oh Land
- Omarion (EMI/StarWorld Entertainment/T.U.G.)
- One More Girl
- Operator Please (Virgin)
- Orbital (EMI –one album Octane (OST), released separately from their catalogue with FFRR/London Records)
- Orchestral Manoeuvres in the Dark (Virgin/EMI)
- Stacie Orrico (Virgin)
- Beth Orton (1996–2005 Heavenly, 2005–present)
- Otep (Capitol)
- Fito Páez (left; now with Warner/Sony Music)
- Papa VS Pretty (Peace + Riot)
- Sabri brothers
- Sarina Paris (EMI Italy)
- Jennylyn Mercado (EMI Philippines)
- Katy Perry (Parlophone/Capitol)
- Pet Shop Boys (Parlophone/EMI) (left March 2013; now with x2/Kobalt Label Services) (return 2017-present catalogue: 1985-2012)
- Liz Phair (Capitol)
- Poison (Capitol/Enigma)
- Prefab Sprout (EMI Liberty, 2001–present)
- Maxi Priest (Relentless)
- Prime Circle (EMI South Africa)
- Los Prisioneros
- Professor Green (Virgin)
- Osvaldo Pugliese (EMI-Odeon)
- Suzi Quatro (RAK)
- Queen (Parlophone/EMI/Capitol/Hollywood Records) (left in 2011)
- Queensrÿche (EMI) (left in 1997)
- R.E.M. (I.R.S./EMI, left in 1988)
- Radar
- Radiohead (Parlophone/Capitol, contract finished as of 2003)
- Rainbow (Oyster/EMI)
- Rascals (Virgin/EMI)
- Ricki-Lee
- Corinne Bailey Rae
- Raekwon
- Raining Pleasure (Capitol/Blue Note)
- Marion Raven (former M2M, Capitol as of 2008)
- RBD
- Red Hot Chili Peppers (left; now with Warner)
- Helen Reddy
- Relient K (Capitol/Gotee)
- Kenny Rogers (Liberty)
- Roll Deep (Relentless)
- The Rolling Stones (Virgin, left in 2008)
- Sigur Rós
- Diana Ross (Capitol/EMI, outside USA/Canada, 1981–present)
- Vasco Rossi (EMI Italy)
- Sakis Rouvas (Minos EMI Greece)
- Roxette (EMI Svenska AB)
- Röyksopp
- Rodney Rude (EMI Australia)
- Rucka Rucka Ali (Pinegrove/Capitol)
- Ruslana
- Deric Ruttan (EMI Canada)
- Lee Ryan (Virgin)
- Samestate (EMI/Sparrow)
- Sandy Lam (Virgin Music Hong Kong)
- George Lam (Warner Music Hong Kong)
- Satyricon
- S.H.E (EMI Music China)
- Sara Tunes
- Sarah Chen
- Salmonella Dub (EMI New Zealand 1994–)
- Scorpions (Harvest/Electrola, Europe)
- Dan Seals (Capitol/Liberty)
- Jay Sean (Relentless)
- Bob Seger (Capitol)
- Selena (EMI Latin)
- The Sex Pistols (Virgin/EMI, September to December 1976)
- Silent Running
- Shazza
- Shaye (EMI Canada)
- Shenandoah (Liberty/Capitol/Free Falls/Cumberland Road)
- SHINee (EMI Music Japan)
- Show Lo (EMI Taiwan)
- Show-Ya (Eastworld/EMI Music Japan, left in 1990)
- The Sleepy Jackson (Capitol)
- The Smashing Pumpkins (Caroline/Virgin/Hut, contract finished in 2001, signed with Reprise Records in 2007, went independent in 2008, re-signed to EMI in 2011)
- The Smiths (were to sign in 1987, but split and Morrissey signed solo deal outside North America instead)
- Snoop Dogg
- Soprano (EMI France)
- Sparklehorse (Parlophone)
- Spice Girls (Virgin)
- Ringo Starr (Parlophone/Apple, left in 1976)
- Starsailor
- Steriogram
- Angus & Julia Stone (EMI Australia/Flock UK)
- Joss Stone (Relentless)
- The Stranglers
- Stefanie Sun (Capitol Music Taiwan)
- Super Monkey's (EMI Music Japan)
- Supergrass (Parlophone)
- Aleks Syntek
- T-ara (EMI Music Japan)
- T.O.Y.
- T. Rex (Regal Zonophone/Fly/EMI)
- Talk Talk (Parlophone/EMI)
- Talking Heads (EMI, outside USA/Canada, 1984–1991)
- Tamta
- Stephy Tang (Gold Label)
- David Tao (EMI Music Taiwan)
- Tasmin Archer
- A Taste of Honey (Capitol)
- The Tea Party
- Telepopmusik
- Tinie Tempah (Parlophone)
- Tension (band) (EMI Music Taiwan)
- Nicholas Teo (Virgin Music Chinese)
- Thalía (Virgin left in 2008 now with Sony Music)
- This World Fair (Rethink)
- Lynda Thomas (Capitol)
- Richard Thompson (Capitol)
- Trina (Slip-N-Slide/DP Entertainment)
- Troye Sivan (EMI/Capitol)
- Jolin Tsai (EMI/Capitol Taiwan, left in 2008)
- KT Tunstall (Relentless/Virgin)
- Grzegorz Turnau (Zaiks/BIEM) (Poland)
- Tina Turner (Parlophone/Capitol)
- Twista (Get Money Gang Entertainment/EMI/Capitol)
- Keith Urban (Capitol Nashville)
- Hikaru Utada
- Lim Hyung Joo (2006–2007)
- Valen Hsu
- Van Hunt
- Vanilla Ice (SBK, 1990–1994)
- The Verve (Hut/Virgin/EMI/Parlophone)
- Zhao Wei (Virgin Music Chinese)
- Vincent Vincent and the Villains
- The Vines
- Vinnie Vincent Invasion (Chrysalis/Capitol)
- Vixen (EMI USA/Manhattan)
- Vodka Collins
- W.A.S.P. (Capitol)
- Waltari
- Watershed (South African band) (EMI South Africa)
- WC (Lench Mob Records)
- Simon Webbe (Innocent/Virgin)
- Matt White
- The White Stripes
- Whitesnake (EMI Records, outside USA/Canada)
- Robbie Williams (Chrysalis/EMI)
- Wilson Phillips (SBK, 1990–1993)
- Wizzard (Harvest)
- Fann Wong (EMI Taiwan, 1997–2000)
- Faye Wong
- Roy Wood (Harvest)
- X Japan (USA only, until 2012)
- XX Teens (Mute)
- Rainie Yang (EMI Taiwan)
- Tony Yayo (G-Unit/EMI)
- You Me At Six (Virgin)
- Young Maylay (Lench Mob Records)
- Bertine Zetlitz
- Peggy Zina (Minos EMI Greece)
- Goldfish (EMI Music Netherlands)
- F.L.Y. (Capitol)

== Classical ==
Classical musicians exclusively or chiefly associated with EMI (on EMI Classics, Angel, HMV and/or Columbia labels)

- Sir Adrian Boult
- Agustin Anievas
- Antonio Pappano
- Artur Schnabel
- Dennis Brain
- Dinu Lipatti
- Sir Edward Elgar
- Elisabeth Schwarzkopf
- Elizabeth Marvelly
- Enrico Caruso
- Fairuz
- Franz Welser-Möst
- Herbert von Karajan (notably in the 1950s)
- Ian Bostridge
- Itzhak Perlman
- Jacqueline du Pré
- Sir John Barbirolli
- Leif Ove Andsnes
- Linda Brava
- Maria Callas
- Mariss Jansons
- Maxim Vengerov
- Natalie Dessay
- Nazzareno Carusi
- Nigel Kennedy
- Olaf Bär
- Otto Klemperer
- Riccardo Muti
- Roberto Alagna
- Rudolf Kempe
- Sabine Meyer
- Sarah Brightman (1997-2007, 2008-2010)
- Simon O'Neill
- Sir Simon Rattle
- Sir Thomas Beecham
- Trey Chui-yee Lee
- Umm Kulthum
- Vanessa-Mae (1994-2003)
- Victoria de los Ángeles
- Wolfgang Sawallisch
- Sir William Walton
- Yehudi Menuhin

== See also ==
- EMI
- List of EMI labels
