= San Juan del Río, Durango =

City in Mexico

- City and municipal seat

- Location within Durango Location within Mexico
- Coordinates: 24°46′N 104°28′W
- Country: Mexico
- State: Durango
- Municipality: San Juan del Río

Population (2010)
  - Total: 2,919

San Juan del Río is a city in the state of Durango, north-western Mexico. It serves as the seat of the municipality of San Juan del Río. As of 2010, the town had a population of 2,912.

It is the birthplace of Mexican revolutionary Pancho Villa.

== Notable people ==
- Juana Belén Gutiérrez de Mendoza (1875–1942), writer and activist.
