= Nazas =

City in the Mexican state of Durango

Nazas, Durango
- City
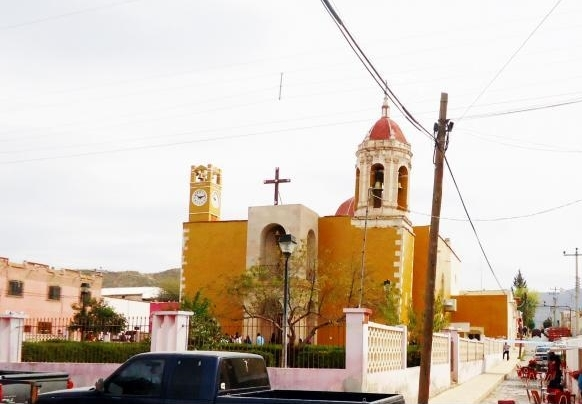
- Santa Ana Parish in Nazas

- Location in Mexico Nazas, Durango (Mexico)
- Coordinates: 24°26′59″N 104°7′21″W
- Country: Mexico
- State: Durango
- Municipality: Nazas

Population (2010)
  - Total: 3,622
- Time zone: UTC-6 (Central)

Nazas is a town in the state of Durango, in north-western Mexico. The town of Nazas is the seat of the municipality of Nazas. As of 2010, the town of Nazas had a population of 3,622.

The "Architectonic ensemble of the Town of Nazas" is one of the sites that form the Camino Real de Tierra Adentro, a UNESCO World Heritage Site since 2010.

The greatest extent of the solar eclipse of 8 April 2024 was near the town of Nazas, with a totality of about 4 minutes and 28 seconds.

== Economy ==
An important agricultural product of the municipality is pecan nut. The town is known as the Paraíso de la Nuez. The pecan varieties grown are Wisha and Western. By planted acreage, pecan is second to alfalfa.
