= Francisco I. Madero, Durango =

City in the Mexican state of Durango

Francisco I. Madero Aguilar
- Municipal seat and city
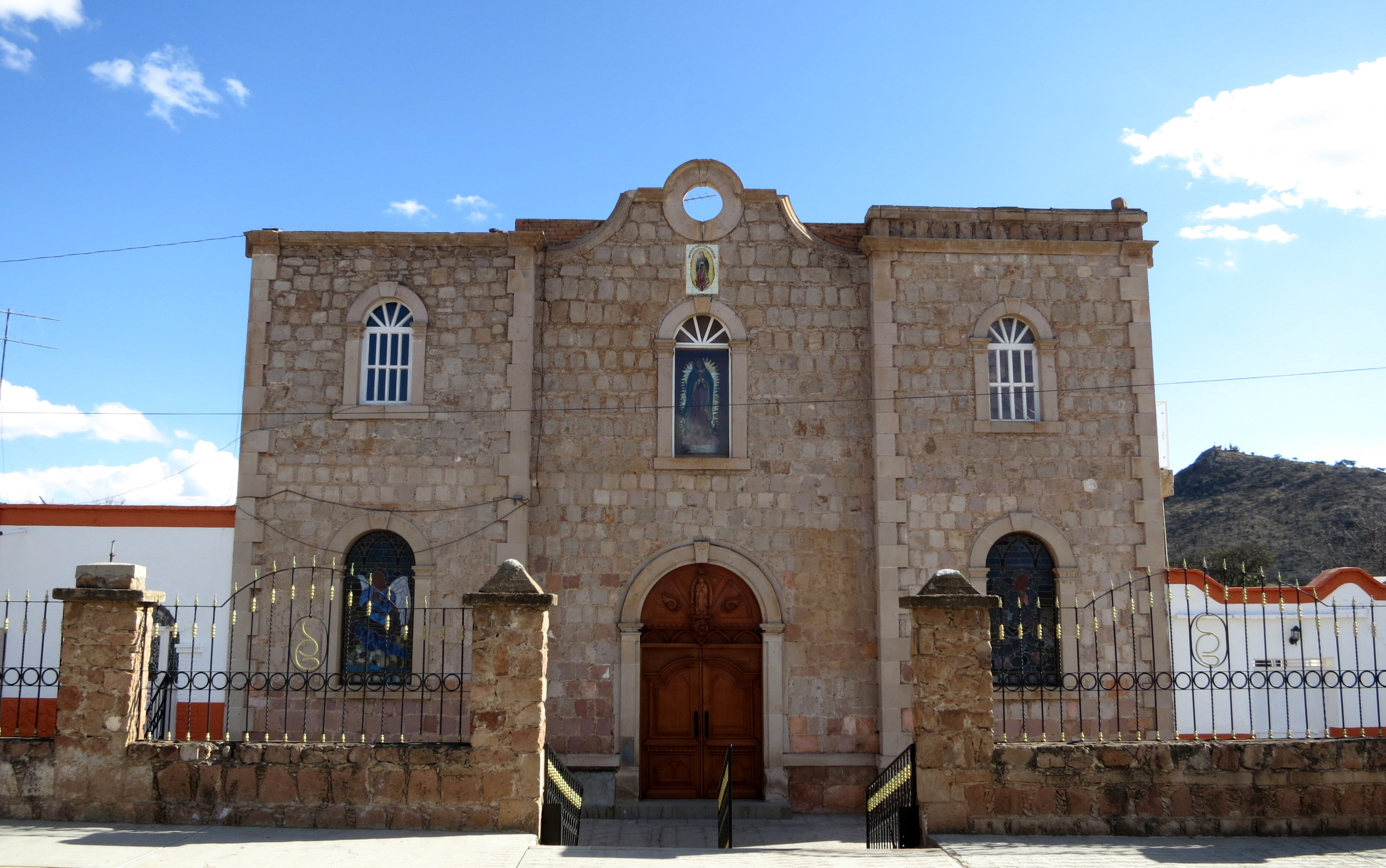
- Parroquia de Nuestra Señora de Guadalupe Reina de América

- Location in Mexico
- Coordinates: 24°24′N 104°19′W
- Country: Mexico
- State: Durango
- Municipality: Pánuco de Coronado

Population (2010)
  - Total: 4,550

Francisco I. Madero is a city and seat of the Pánuco de Coronado, in the state of Durango, north-western Mexico. As of 2010, the town of Francisco I. Madero had a population of 4,550.

== Education ==
The city of Francisco I. Madero is served by 9 public school campuses which provide education to students in grades K–12.

=== Elementary and junior high schools ===
The city of Francisco I. Madero have three schools for students grades K–8. They are: Benito Juarez The School, Miguel Hildalgo North Division School,

=== High schools ===
The public high school in Madero are: Technical Middle School No. 2.

=== Colleges and universities ===
Madero is served on the collegiate level by Benito Juarez The College, and College Bacheillers classes are held in morning and evening hours.
