= Peñón Blanco Municipality =

Municipality in the Mexican state of Durango

Peñón Blanco
- Municipality
- Location in Mexico
- Coordinates: 24°47′N 104°01′W
- Country: Mexico
- State: Durango
- Municipal seat: Peñón Blanco

Area
  - Total: 1,827 km^{2} (705 sq mi)

Population (2010)
  - Total: 10,473
  - Density: 5.732/km^{2} (14.85/sq mi)

Peñón Blanco is a municipality in the Mexican state of Durango. The municipal seat lies at Peñón Blanco. The municipality covers an area of 1827 km^{2}.

In 2010, the municipality had a total population of 10,473, up from 9,891 in 2005.

In 2010, the town of Peñón Blanco had a population of 5,271. Other than the town of Peñón Blanco, the municipality had 103 localities, the largest of which (with 2010 population in parentheses) was: General Jesús Agustín Castro (Independencia) (1,907), classified as rural.
