= Santa Clara, Durango =

Santa Clara
- Municipal seat and city
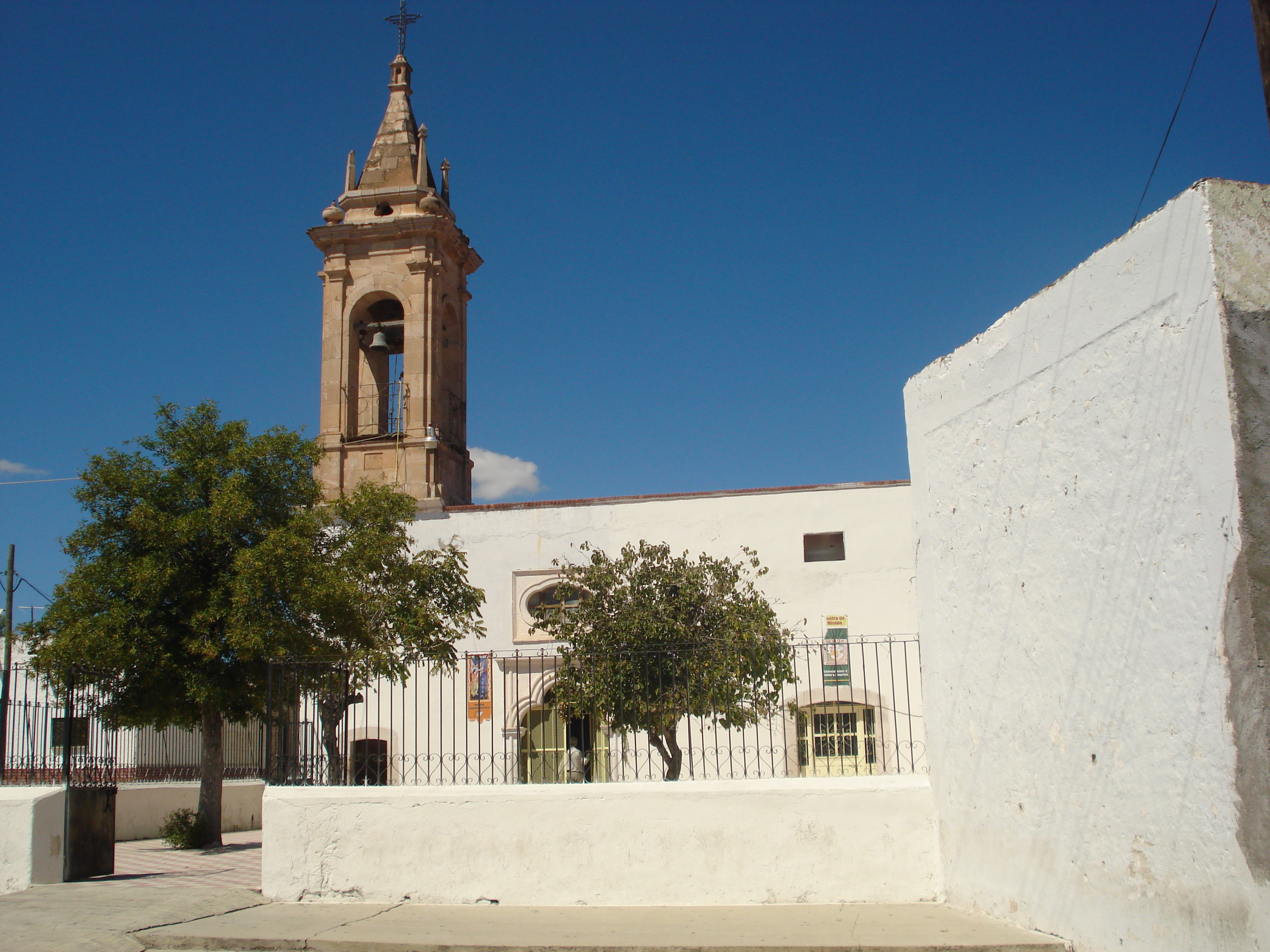
- Templo de Santa Clara

- Location in Mexico
- Coordinates: 25°28′30″N 103°21′25″W
- Country: Mexico
- State: Durango
- Municipality: Santa Clara

Population (2010)
  - Total: 4,061

Santa Clara is a city and seat of the municipality of Santa Clara, in the state of Durango, north-western Mexico. As of 2010, the city had a population of 4,061. It has an annual fair celebrating their Virgin Mary statue on August 12 of every year.

In 1976 a meteorite of 63kg was found near Santa Clara. The meteor had an undiscovered isotope of silver.

== Climate ==
Climate data for Santa Clara (1991–2020)
Month	Jan	Feb	Mar	Apr	May	Jun	Jul	Aug	Sep	Oct	Nov	Dec	Year
Record high °C (°F)	31.0 (87.8)	34.5 (94.1)	38.5 (101.3)	39.0 (102.2)	41.0 (105.8)	42.5 (108.5)	39.5 (103.1)	38.5 (101.3)	35.5 (95.9)	35.1 (95.2)	35.5 (95.9)	32.5 (90.5)	42.5 (108.5)
Mean daily maximum °C (°F)	21.5 (70.7)	24.4 (75.9)	27.2 (81.0)	30.7 (87.3)	32.8 (91.0)	31.8 (89.2)	29.6 (85.3)	29.2 (84.6)	27.1 (80.8)	26.9 (80.4)	24.3 (75.7)	22.0 (71.6)	27.3 (81.1)
Daily mean °C (°F)	11.3 (52.3)	13.8 (56.8)	16.4 (61.5)	19.7 (67.5)	22.6 (72.7)	23.5 (74.3)	22.4 (72.3)	21.8 (71.2)	20.1 (68.2)	17.7 (63.9)	14.2 (57.6)	11.6 (52.9)	17.9 (64.2)
Mean daily minimum °C (°F)	1.0 (33.8)	3.1 (37.6)	5.6 (42.1)	8.7 (47.7)	12.4 (54.3)	15.3 (59.5)	15.1 (59.2)	14.5 (58.1)	13.0 (55.4)	8.5 (47.3)	4.2 (39.6)	1.3 (34.3)	8.6 (47.5)
Record low °C (°F)	−12.0 (10.4)	−8.0 (17.6)	−8.0 (17.6)	−4.0 (24.8)	2.0 (35.6)	4.0 (39.2)	5.5 (41.9)	5.0 (41.0)	0.0 (32.0)	−5.0 (23.0)	−9.0 (15.8)	−13.0 (8.6)	−13.0 (8.6)
Average precipitation mm (inches)	12.8 (0.50)	6.6 (0.26)	7.5 (0.30)	4.6 (0.18)	16.4 (0.65)	57.2 (2.25)	93.0 (3.66)	86.6 (3.41)	91.6 (3.61)	26.1 (1.03)	10.8 (0.43)	5.5 (0.22)	418.7 (16.48)
Average precipitation days (≥ 0.1 mm)	1.8	0.8	1.0	0.8	2.3	6.4	9.4	9.3	7.9	3.3	1.7	1.2	45.9
Source: Servicio Meteorologico Nacional
