= Santa Clara Municipality, Durango =

Municipality in the Mexican state of Durango

Santa Clara Municipality
- Municipality
- Location within Durango Location within Mexico
- Coordinates: 24°28′N 103°21′W
- Country: Mexico
- State: Durango
- Municipal seat: Santa Clara

Area
  - Total: 1,004.2 km^{2} (387.7 sq mi)

Population (2010)
  - Total: 7,003
  - Density: 6.974/km^{2} (18.06/sq mi)
- Time zone: UTC-6 (Zona Centro)

Santa Clara Municipality is a municipality in the Mexican state of Durango. The municipal seat lies at Santa Clara. The municipality covers an area of 1004.2 km^{2}.

As of 2010, the municipality had a total population of 7,003, up from 6,437 as of 2005.

As of 2010, the town of Santa Clara had a population of 4,061. Other than the town of Santa Clara, the municipality had 45 localities, none of which had a population over 1,000.
