= San Juan de Guadalupe =

City in the Mexican state of Durango

San Juan de Guadalupe Durango
- Municipal seat and city
- Motto: El Pueblo de los Alba’s/ Alva’s
- Location in Mexico
- Coordinates: 24°37′N 102°46′W
- Country: Mexico
- State: Durango
- Municipality: San Juan de Guadalupe

Population (2010)
  - Total: 1,712

San Juan de Guadalupe is a city and seat of the municipality of San Juan de Guadalupe, in the state of Durango, north-western Mexico. As of 2010, the town of San Juan de Guadalupe had a population of 1,712.

== Climate ==
Climate data for San Juan de Guadalupe (1991–2020)
Month	Jan	Feb	Mar	Apr	May	Jun	Jul	Aug	Sep	Oct	Nov	Dec	Year
Record high °C (°F)	37 (99)	39 (102)	39 (102)	43 (109)	40 (104)	43 (109)	39 (102)	39 (102)	48 (118)	40 (104)	37 (99)	35 (95)	48 (118)
Mean daily maximum °C (°F)	22.5 (72.5)	24.8 (76.6)	25.7 (78.3)	27.4 (81.3)	28.6 (83.5)	28.4 (83.1)	27.0 (80.6)	26.7 (80.1)	25.6 (78.1)	25.6 (78.1)	24.3 (75.7)	22.7 (72.9)	25.8 (78.4)
Daily mean °C (°F)	14.7 (58.5)	16.4 (61.5)	17.6 (63.7)	19.4 (66.9)	20.9 (69.6)	21.2 (70.2)	20.0 (68.0)	20.2 (68.4)	18.8 (65.8)	18.0 (64.4)	16.3 (61.3)	14.9 (58.8)	18.2 (64.8)
Mean daily minimum °C (°F)	6.9 (44.4)	8.0 (46.4)	9.5 (49.1)	11.4 (52.5)	13.2 (55.8)	14.0 (57.2)	13.1 (55.6)	13.7 (56.7)	12.0 (53.6)	10.5 (50.9)	8.3 (46.9)	7.1 (44.8)	10.6 (51.1)
Record low °C (°F)	−10 (14)	−8 (18)	−7 (19)	−1 (30)	1 (34)	1 (34)	1 (34)	1 (34)	0.6 (33.1)	0 (32)	−6 (21)	−12 (10)	−12 (10)
Average precipitation mm (inches)	12.3 (0.48)	7.2 (0.28)	9.9 (0.39)	6.8 (0.27)	10.2 (0.40)	41.4 (1.63)	56.7 (2.23)	48.6 (1.91)	58.5 (2.30)	22.8 (0.90)	7.6 (0.30)	5.0 (0.20)	287.0 (11.30)
Average precipitation days (≥ 0.1 mm)	2.3	1.8	1.4	1.6	3.2	5.9	8.3	9.1	8.1	4.6	1.9	1.7	49.9
Source: Servicio Meteorologico Nacional
