= San Juan de Guadalupe Municipality =

Municipality in the Mexican state of Durango

San Juan de Guadalupe
- Municipality
- Location within Durango Location within Mexico
- Coordinates: 24°37′50″N 102°46′41″W
- Country: Mexico
- State: Durango
- Municipal seat: San Juan de Guadalupe

Area
  - Total: 2,343.1 km^{2} (904.7 sq mi)

Population (2010)
  - Total: 5,947
  - Density: 2.538/km^{2} (6.574/sq mi)
- Time zone: UTC-6 (Zona Centro)

San Juan de Guadalupe is a municipality in the Mexican state of Durango. The municipal seat lies at San Juan de Guadalupe. The municipality covers an area of 2343.1 km^{2}.

As of 2010, the municipality had a total population of 5,947, up from 5,858 as of 2005.

As of 2010, the town of San Juan de Guadalupe had a population of 1,712. Other than the town of San Juan de Guadalupe, the municipality had 70 localities, none of which had a population over 1,000.
