= Peñón Blanco, Durango =

City in the Mexican state of Durango

Peñón Blanco
- Municipal seat and city
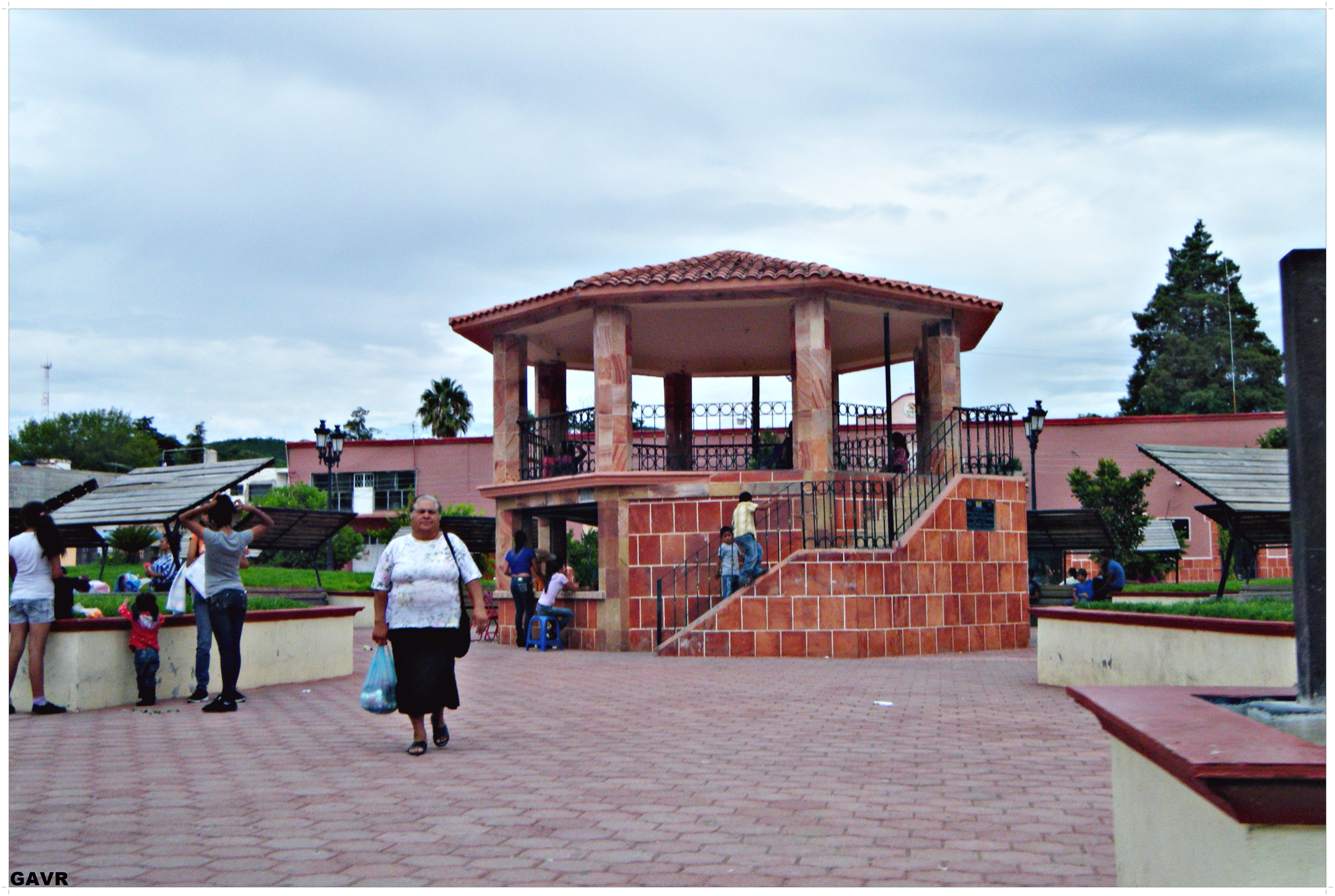
- Downtown Peñón Blanco

- Location in Mexico
- Coordinates: 24°47′N 104°02′W
- Country: Mexico
- State: Durango
- Municipality: Peñón Blanco

Population (2010)
  - Total: 5,271

Peñón Blanco is a city and seat of the municipality of Peñón Blanco in the Mexican state of Durango.

It is located in the central part of the State of Durango, at the North of Los Llanos y los Valles. It limits with Nazas to the north, San Juan del Río to the west, Cuencamé to the east, and with Guadalupe Victoria to the south.

As of 2010, the town of Peñón Blanco had a population of 5,271.

== Climate ==
Climate data for Peñón Blanco (1991–2020)
Month	Jan	Feb	Mar	Apr	May	Jun	Jul	Aug	Sep	Oct	Nov	Dec	Year
Record high °C (°F)	33.0 (91.4)	38.0 (100.4)	41.0 (105.8)	42.0 (107.6)	43.0 (109.4)	46.0 (114.8)	42.0 (107.6)	42.0 (107.6)	40.0 (104.0)	40.0 (104.0)	37.0 (98.6)	36.0 (96.8)	46.0 (114.8)
Mean daily maximum °C (°F)	23.6 (74.5)	26.4 (79.5)	28.5 (83.3)	31.9 (89.4)	33.6 (92.5)	33.1 (91.6)	31.3 (88.3)	30.8 (87.4)	29.0 (84.2)	28.9 (84.0)	26.6 (79.9)	24.5 (76.1)	29.0 (84.2)
Daily mean °C (°F)	11.5 (52.7)	14.3 (57.7)	16.2 (61.2)	19.6 (67.3)	21.9 (71.4)	22.9 (73.2)	22.2 (72.0)	21.4 (70.5)	20.0 (68.0)	18.1 (64.6)	14.8 (58.6)	12.8 (55.0)	18.0 (64.4)
Mean daily minimum °C (°F)	−0.5 (31.1)	2.2 (36.0)	4.0 (39.2)	7.4 (45.3)	10.3 (50.5)	12.7 (54.9)	13.1 (55.6)	12.1 (53.8)	11.0 (51.8)	7.4 (45.3)	2.9 (37.2)	1.1 (34.0)	7.0 (44.6)
Record low °C (°F)	−11.0 (12.2)	−16.0 (3.2)	−7.0 (19.4)	−4.0 (24.8)	1.0 (33.8)	2.0 (35.6)	7.0 (44.6)	2.0 (35.6)	1.0 (33.8)	−7.0 (19.4)	−13.0 (8.6)	−11.0 (12.2)	−16.0 (3.2)
Average precipitation mm (inches)	10.5 (0.41)	5.6 (0.22)	9.2 (0.36)	2.7 (0.11)	13.2 (0.52)	59.3 (2.33)	101.7 (4.00)	101.4 (3.99)	87.3 (3.44)	24.2 (0.95)	14.1 (0.56)	10.8 (0.43)	440.0 (17.32)
Average precipitation days (≥ 0.1 mm)	2.3	1.0	1.4	0.9	2.6	6.8	11.6	10.2	9.1	4.0	2.0	1.4	53.3
Source: Servicio Meteorologico Nacional

== Festivals ==
The most important event in Peñón Blanco as far as traditional "fiestas", is La Feria de San Diego de Alcalá that takes place on November 13 of every year. The culmination of several events such as dances and competitions to select the most beautiful flower of the "county" (La flor mas bella del ejido) What it is, they crown the most beautiful girl of the municipality...
