= Cuencamé Municipality =

Municipality in the Mexican state of Durango

Cuencamé
- Municipality
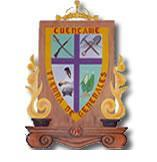
- Coat of arms

- Location in Mexico
- Coordinates: 24°52′N 103°42′W
- Country: Mexico
- State: Durango
- Municipal seat: Cuencamé de Ceniceros

Area
  - Total: 4,797.6 km^{2} (1,852.4 sq mi)

Population (2015)
  - Total: 35,415
  - Density: 7.3818/km^{2} (19.119/sq mi)
- Time zone: UTC-6 (Zona Centro)

Cuencamé is a municipality in the Mexican state of Durango. In 2015, the municipality had a total population of 35,415. The municipal seat lies at Cuencamé de Ceniceros. The municipality covers an area of 1324.9 km^{2}.

== Geography ==
The municipality had 276 localities, the largest of which (with 2010 populations in parentheses) were: Cuencamé de Ceniceros (9,848), Cuauhtémoc (2,998), Velardeña (2,425), classified as urban, and Emiliano Zapata (2,050), Ramón Corona (1,870), Pedriceña (Estación Pedriceña) (1,765), and Pasaje (1,474), classified as rural.

=== Climate ===
Cuencamé, Durango

Climate chart (precipitation, max. and min. temperature)
| J | F | M | A | M | J | J | A | S | O | N | D |
| 12 25 7 | 5 27 8 | 2 31 11 | 7 32 14 | 17 35 17 | 51 35 18 | 88 32 18 | 101 32 17 | 65 31 16 | 23 30 13 | 10 28 10 | 10 25 8 |
- █ Average max. and min. temperatures in °C
- █ Precipitation totals in mm
Imperial conversion
| J | F | M | A | M | J | J | A | S | O | N | D |
| 0.5 76 44 | 0.2 81 46 | 0.1 87 51 | 0.3 90 57 | 0.7 95 62 | 2 94 65 | 3.5 90 64 | 4 90 63 | 2.6 88 61 | 0.9 86 56 | 0.4 82 50 | 0.4 76 46 |
- █ Average max. and min. temperatures in °F
- █ Precipitation totals in inches

The area is semiarid. The ground is flat and surrounded by mountains. The average temperature is around 21.5 °C. The annual rainfall is 392.1 millimeters.

=== Mountains ===
To the township North lies the San Lorenzo mountain. Between these mountains lie the main state highway and the railroad to Torreón, Coahuila. In this area there is the Huarichic Canyon. These mountains spread until the Lerdo township. And the name of this Mountains is “Sierra Fernández”.

In this chain of the mountains lies a San Isidro peak that is a wall of this chain of the mountains. In these mountains lie the Velardeña's valley and its mines. There are rural and steep mountains as a Guadalupe mountains that lies and combine the area landscape with Jimulco and Simon Bolivar, both in the state of Coahuila. These two mountains Guadalupe and Jimulco shape the most wide canyon of this area, between them it spreads the Aguanaval river and the state railroad. The name of this mountain is “Jimulco Canyon”. The Aguanaval river flow into the Nazas River, this is the main river in this area. The surrounding area to this mountains is arid and easy to watch the Cretaceous formation of the plates and layers of the ground.

=== Rivers, lakes, and springs ===
The main river in this area is the Cuencamé stream. All of the rivers in this area arrive to the Cuencamé stream. There are many small streams that in the rainy season are plenty of water. There is another stream near to San Pedro Ocuila and other named the “Arrieras”. In the recent years many of these streams have decreased substantially. The Cuencamé stream runs into the Nazas river in the point named Rancho de Fernández. In the 1950s they were built two dams to keep the mountains water in the area. These dams have had helping to the agriculture needs in this north area.
