= Conservatorio de música de Puebla =

Music education institution in Puebla, Mexico

Coordinates: 19°02′47″N 98°12′31″W

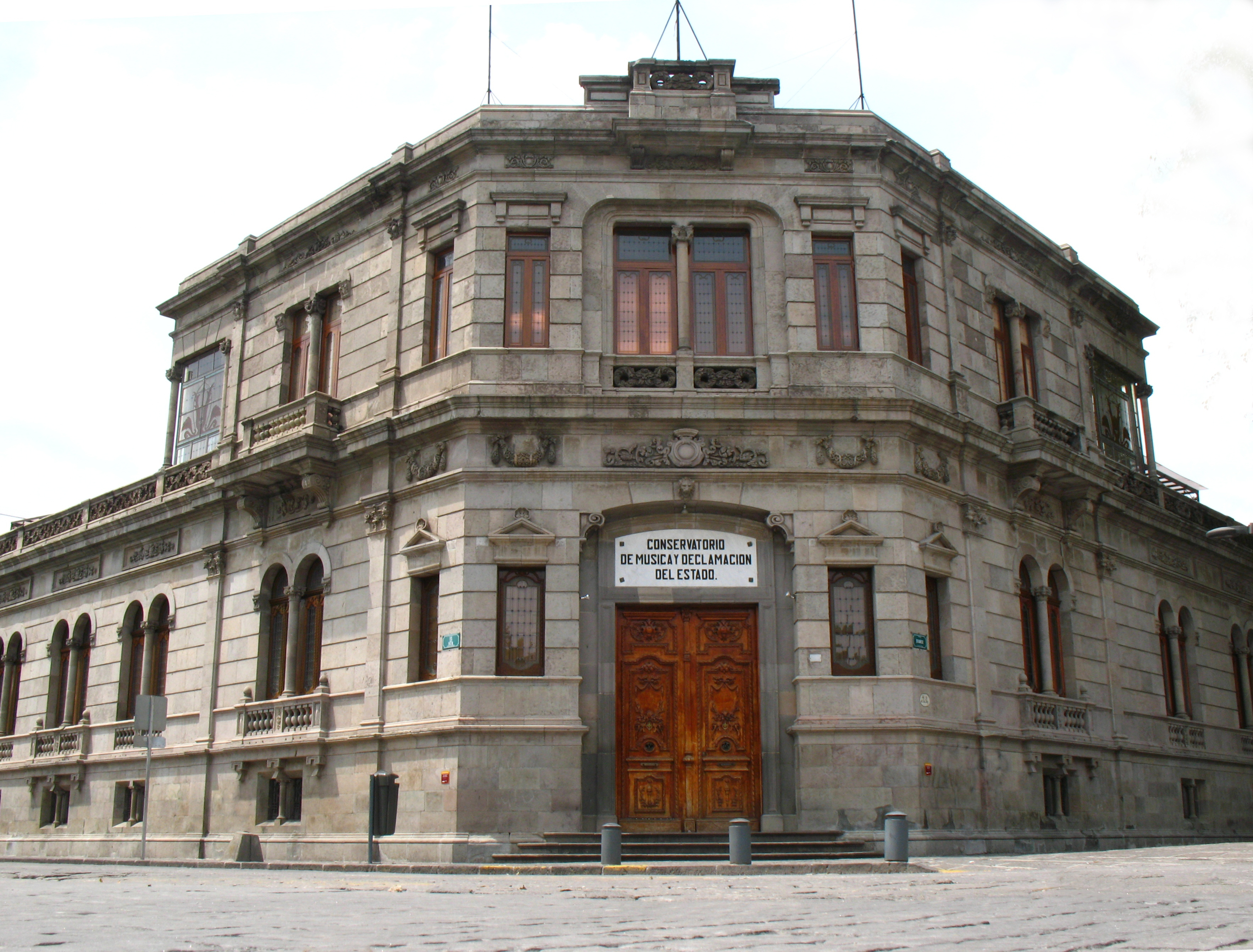

The Conservatorio de música del Estado de Puebla, also known as Benemérito Conservatorio de música del Estado de Puebla, is an institution of music education that is located in the city of Puebla. The conservatory was founded on October 22, 1916.

== History ==
Music has been an important aspect for the City of Puebla since colonial times. On October 22, 1916, the city's Conservatory was founded, as an initiative of the composer Carlos Samaniego and Juan B. Cervantes, the latter being the brother of Luis G. Cervantes, provisional governor of Puebla. The institution was founded as the Conservatory of Music and Declamation, and Samaniego became director of the institute.

Initially, the conservatory was established in the Old Archbishopric (Post Office building). Later his headquarters moved to a building on Avenida Juárez and 13 Sur, where he remained for 47 years.
