= Pánuco de Coronado Municipality =

Municipality in the Mexican state of Durango

Pánuco de Coronado
- Municipality
- Municipality of Pánuco de Coronado in Durango

- Location in Mexico
- Coordinates: 24°32′21″N 104°19′31″W
- Country: Mexico
- State: Durango
- Municipal seat: Francisco I. Madero

Area
  - Total: 1,059.9 km^{2} (409.2 sq mi)

Population (2010)
  - Total: 11,927
  - Density: 11.253/km^{2} (29.145/sq mi)

Pánuco de Coronado is a municipality in the Mexican state of Durango. The municipal seat lies at Francisco I. Madero. The municipality covers an area of 1059.9 km^{2}.

As of 2010, the municipality had a total population of 11,927, up from 11,886 as of 2005.

As of 2010, the town of Pánuco de Coronado had a population of 1,291. Other than the town of Pánuco de Coronado, the municipality had 58 localities, the largest of which (with 2010 population in parentheses) was: Francisco I. Madero (4,550), classified as urban.
