= Nazas Municipality =

Municipality in the Mexican state of Durango

Nazas
- Municipality
- Location within Durango Location within Mexico
- Coordinates: 25°13′34″N 104°6′39″W
- Country: Mexico
- State: Durango
- Municipal seat: Nazas

Area
  - Total: 2,412.8 km^{2} (931.6 sq mi)

Population (2010)
  - Total: 12,411
  - Density: 5.1438/km^{2} (13.322/sq mi)
- Time zone: UTC-6 (Central)

Nazas is a municipality in the Mexican state of Durango. The municipal seat lies at Nazas. The municipality covers an area of 2,412.8 km^{2}.

In 2020, the municipality had a total population of 12,894, up from 12,411 in 2010 and 12,166 in 2005.

As of 2010, the town of Nazas had a population of 3,622. Other than the town of Nazas, the municipality had 78 localities, the largest of which (with 2010 populations in parentheses) were: General Lázaro Cárdenas (Pueblo Nuevo) (1,927) and Paso Nacional (1,366), classified as rural.

The greatest extent of the solar eclipse of 8 April 2024 was in the village of Guadalupe Hidalgo in the municipality of Nazas, with a totality of about 4 minutes and 28 seconds.
