= Guadalupe Victoria, Puebla =

Guadalupe Victoria
- Municipality
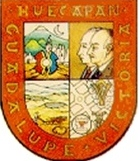
- Coat of arms

- Location within Mexico
- Coordinates: 19°17′00″N 97°20′00″W
- Country: Mexico
- State: Puebla

Area
  - Total: 239.83 km^{2} (92.60 sq mi)

Population (2005)Municipality
  - Total: 15,041
- Time zone: UTC-6 (Zona Centro)
- Website: (in Spanish)

Guadalupe Victoria is a municipality in the Mexican state of Puebla. According to the National Statistics Institute (INEGI), it had a population of 15,041 inhabitants in the 2005 census. Its total area is 239.83 km². It is named after Guadalupe Victoria, the first president of Mexico.

Its geographical coordinates are 19° 17′ North, and 97° 20′ West. Its average altitude is 2,440 metres (8,005 ft) above sea level. Its highest elevation is the rhyolitic twin dome volcano Las Derrumbadas (3480 m).
