= Lerdo, Durango =

City in the Mexican state of Durango

- City
- Ciudad Lerdo
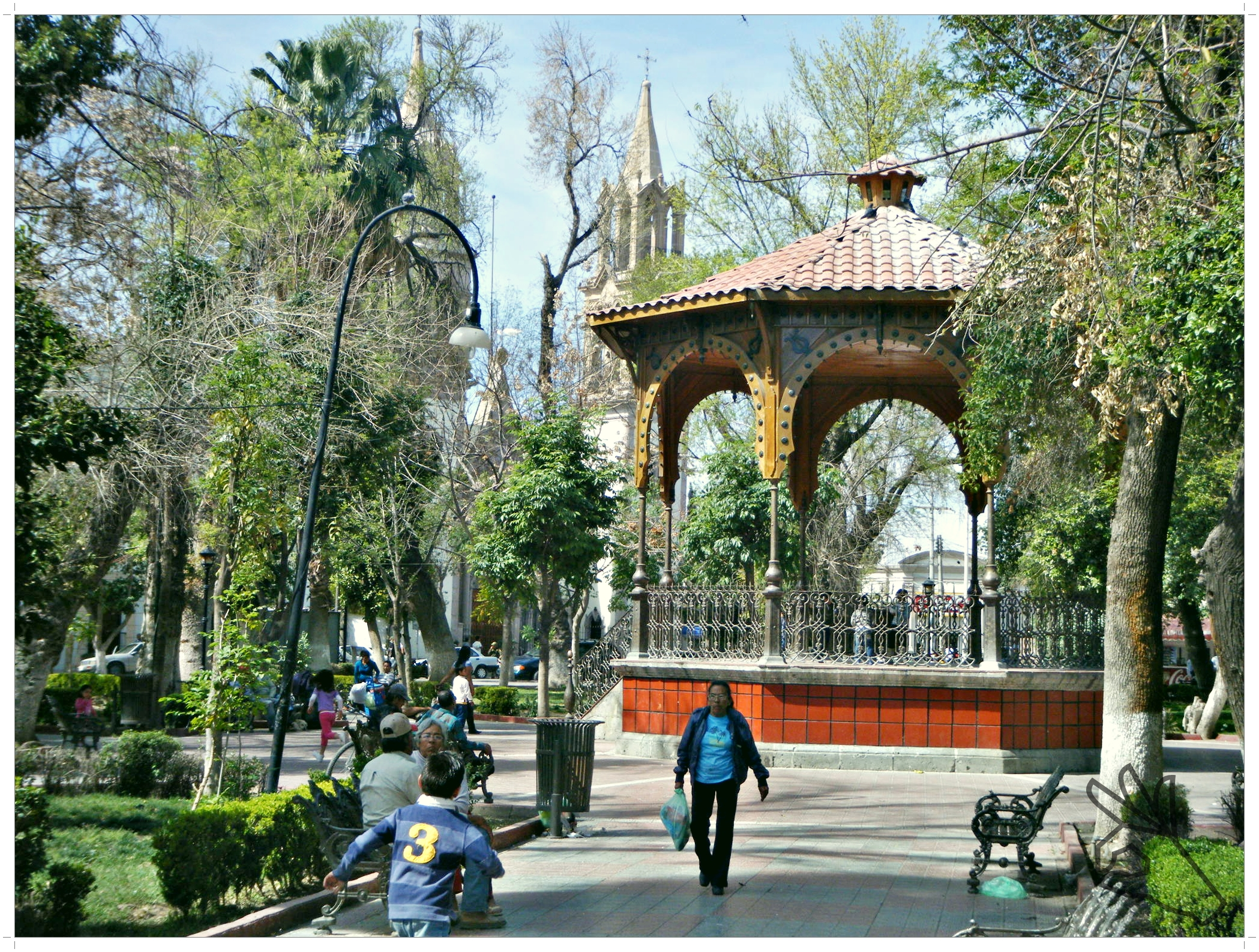
- Plaza de Armas of Lerdo
- Nickname: garden city
- Location in Mexico Lerdo, Durango (Mexico)
- Coordinates: 25°33′N 103°31′W
- Country: Mexico
- State: Durango
- Municipality: Lerdo

Government
  - Presidente Municipal: Carlos Aguilera Andrade
- Elevation: 1,130 m (3,710 ft)

Population (2010)
  - Total: 79,669
- Website: Lerdo.gob.mx

Ciudad Lerdo (Lerdo City) is a small city in the northeastern portion of the Mexican state of Durango. It serves as the municipal seat for the surrounding municipality of the same name.

It is located at co-ordinates 25.33° N, 103.31° W, bordering southeastern Coahuila. As of 2010, the city of Lerdo had a population of 79,669, up from 71,373 people as of 2005. Lerdo Municipality had a population of 141,043. The municipality has an area of 1,868.8 km^{2} (721.5 sq mi). It is part of a greater metropolitan area that includes Torreón Municipality and Matamoros Municipality in Coahuila, as well as Gómez Palacio Municipality in Durango.

The city is lush with vegetation, but has an arid climate. Ciudad Lerdo is known for its parks, gardens, and ice cream made with fresh milk from local dairies.

== Notable people ==
- Nestor Mesta Chayres, also known as "El Gitano de México" (1908–1971)—lyric opera tenor and bolero vocalist of international renown; referred to as "Mexico's Gypsy (Gitano)".
- Pepe Jaramillo (1921–2001)—acclaimed pianist from the 1950s through the 1970s.

== Climate ==
Climate data for Ciudad Lerdo (1991–2020)
Month	Jan	Feb	Mar	Apr	May	Jun	Jul	Aug	Sep	Oct	Nov	Dec	Year
Record high °C (°F)	32.0 (89.6)	36.0 (96.8)	39.0 (102.2)	40.0 (104.0)	42.0 (107.6)	41.5 (106.7)	39.0 (102.2)	39.0 (102.2)	38.0 (100.4)	37.5 (99.5)	34.0 (93.2)	31.5 (88.7)	42.0 (107.6)
Mean daily maximum °C (°F)	20.9 (69.6)	24.7 (76.5)	28.1 (82.6)	31.9 (89.4)	34.7 (94.5)	34.8 (94.6)	33.6 (92.5)	33.2 (91.8)	30.6 (87.1)	28.7 (83.7)	24.5 (76.1)	21.4 (70.5)	28.9 (84.0)
Daily mean °C (°F)	13.7 (56.7)	17.1 (62.8)	20.2 (68.4)	24.0 (75.2)	27.0 (80.6)	28.0 (82.4)	27.5 (81.5)	27.2 (81.0)	24.8 (76.6)	21.9 (71.4)	17.4 (63.3)	14.2 (57.6)	21.9 (71.4)
Mean daily minimum °C (°F)	6.5 (43.7)	9.4 (48.9)	12.2 (54.0)	16.0 (60.8)	19.3 (66.7)	21.3 (70.3)	21.4 (70.5)	21.2 (70.2)	19.0 (66.2)	15.1 (59.2)	10.2 (50.4)	7.0 (44.6)	14.9 (58.8)
Record low °C (°F)	−5.0 (23.0)	−8.0 (17.6)	0.0 (32.0)	1.5 (34.7)	9.0 (48.2)	0.0 (32.0)	2.5 (36.5)	11.0 (51.8)	9.0 (48.2)	2.0 (35.6)	−2.5 (27.5)	−7.0 (19.4)	−8.0 (17.6)
Average precipitation mm (inches)	10.3 (0.41)	4.8 (0.19)	8.7 (0.34)	3.0 (0.12)	11.2 (0.44)	25.6 (1.01)	39.7 (1.56)	38.5 (1.52)	66.5 (2.62)	21.3 (0.84)	8.2 (0.32)	6.3 (0.25)	244.1 (9.61)
Average precipitation days (≥ 0.1 mm)	3.5	2.3	2.0	2.2	4.8	6.9	9.6	8.0	8.9	4.4	3.1	2.4	58.1
Source: Servicio Meteorologico Nacional

== Sister cities ==
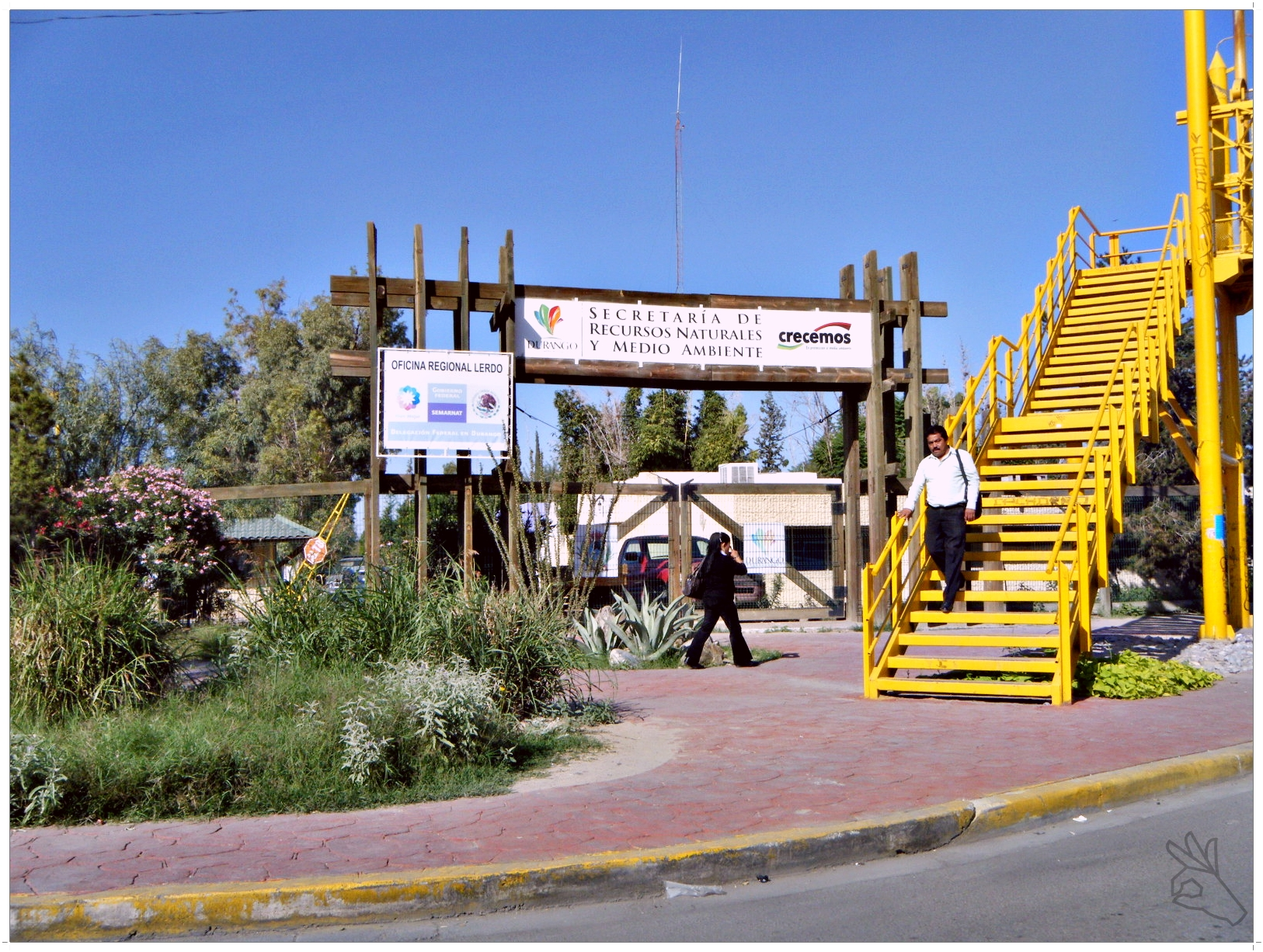
City nursery

Ciudad Lerdo has one sister city, as designated by Sister Cities International:

- Las Cruces, New Mexico, United States
