= Ciudad Guadalupe Victoria =

City in the Mexican state of Durango

Guadalupe Victoria
- Municipal seat and city
- Location in Mexico
- Coordinates: 24°26′59″N 104°7′21″W
- Country: Mexico
- State: Durango
- Municipality: Guadalupe Victoria
- Elevation: 2,002 m (6,568 ft)

Population (2010)
  - Total: 16,506
- Time zone: UTC-6 (CST)

Guadalupe Victoria is a city and seat of Guadalupe Victoria Municipality, in the state of Durango, north-western Mexico. In 2010, the city of Guadalupe Victoria had a population of 16,506.

== Geography ==
=== Climate ===
Climate data for Guadalupe Victoria (1991-2020)
Month	Jan	Feb	Mar	Apr	May	Jun	Jul	Aug	Sep	Oct	Nov	Dec	Year
Record high °C (°F)	31.0 (87.8)	31.0 (87.8)	34.0 (93.2)	35.0 (95.0)	40.0 (104.0)	43.0 (109.4)	37.0 (98.6)	35.0 (95.0)	34.0 (93.2)	34.0 (93.2)	32.0 (89.6)	34.0 (93.2)	43.0 (109.4)
Mean daily maximum °C (°F)	19.4 (66.9)	21.6 (70.9)	23.8 (74.8)	26.8 (80.2)	29.2 (84.6)	28.9 (84.0)	26.4 (79.5)	26.0 (78.8)	24.6 (76.3)	24.6 (76.3)	22.5 (72.5)	20.2 (68.4)	24.5 (76.1)
Daily mean °C (°F)	11.0 (51.8)	12.8 (55.0)	14.8 (58.6)	17.6 (63.7)	20.5 (68.9)	21.7 (71.1)	20.3 (68.5)	19.9 (67.8)	18.7 (65.7)	17.0 (62.6)	13.9 (57.0)	11.5 (52.7)	16.6 (61.9)
Mean daily minimum °C (°F)	2.5 (36.5)	4.0 (39.2)	5.7 (42.3)	8.5 (47.3)	11.8 (53.2)	14.5 (58.1)	14.2 (57.6)	13.9 (57.0)	12.7 (54.9)	9.3 (48.7)	5.4 (41.7)	2.9 (37.2)	8.8 (47.8)
Record low °C (°F)	−13.0 (8.6)	−10.0 (14.0)	−8.0 (17.6)	−2.0 (28.4)	0.5 (32.9)	4.0 (39.2)	6.0 (42.8)	7.0 (44.6)	2.0 (35.6)	−4.0 (24.8)	−10.0 (14.0)	−14.0 (6.8)	−14.0 (6.8)
Average precipitation mm (inches)	14.5 (0.57)	8.5 (0.33)	6.9 (0.27)	3.9 (0.15)	10.9 (0.43)	70.3 (2.77)	125.3 (4.93)	116.8 (4.60)	86.5 (3.41)	26.7 (1.05)	18.9 (0.74)	8.9 (0.35)	498.1 (19.61)
Average precipitation days (≥ 0.1 mm)	2.9	1.7	1.6	1.7	3.9	10.5	16.7	14.4	12.2	4.8	2.4	2.1	74.9
Source: Servicio Meteorológico National
