= Guadalupe Victoria Municipality, Durango =

Municipality in the Mexican state of Durango

Guadalupe Victoria
- Municipality
- Location within Durango Location within Mexico
- Coordinates: 24°27′N 104°07′W
- Country: Mexico
- State: Durango
- Municipal seat: Ciudad Guadalupe Victoria

Area
  - Total: 767.10 km^{2} (296.18 sq mi)

Population (2010)
  - Total: 34,052
  - Density: 44.391/km^{2} (114.97/sq mi)
- Time zone: UTC-6 (Zona Centro)

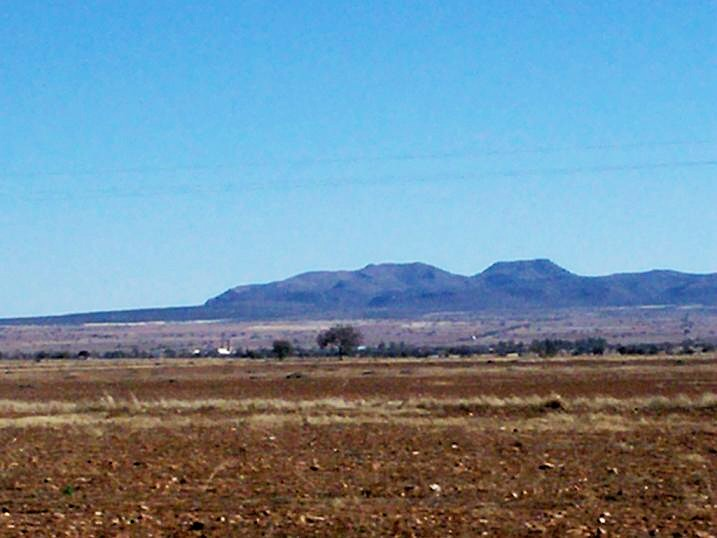

Guadalupe Victoria is a municipality in the Mexican state of Durango. The municipal seat lies at Ciudad Guadalupe Victoria. The municipality covers an area of 767.10 km^{2}.

As of 2010, the municipality had a total population of 36,695.

As of 2010, the city of Guadalupe Victoria had a population of 16,506. Other than the city of Guadalupe Victoria, the municipality had 92 localities, the largest of which (with 2010 populations in parentheses) were: Antonio Amaro (Saucillo) (3,526), Ignacio Allende (2,588), Ignacio Ramírez (2,432), classified as urban, and General Calixto Contreras (Colorada) (2,213), Felipe Carrillo Puerto (Tarabillas) (2,019), and José Guadalupe Rodríguez (Peñuelas) (1,374), classified as rural.
