= San Juan del Río Municipality, Durango =

Municipality in the Mexican state of Durango

San Juan del Río
- Municipality
- Location within Durango Location within Mexico
- Coordinates: 24°46′N 104°28′W
- Country: Mexico
- State: Durango
- Municipal seat: San Juan del Río

Area
  - Total: 1,279 km^{2} (494 sq mi)

Population (2010)
  - Total: 11,855
  - Density: 9.269/km^{2} (24.01/sq mi)
- Time zone: UTC-6 (Zona Centro)
- Postal code: 98743
- Area code: 677

San Juan del Río is a municipality in the Mexican state of Durango. The municipal seat is at San Juan del Rio. The municipality covers an area of 1279 km^{2}.

In 2010, the municipality had a population of 11,855, up from 10,364 in 2005.

The municipality has 109 localities, the largest of which (with 2010 populations in parentheses) were San Juan del Río del Centauro del Norte (2,912), classified as urban, and Diez de Octubre (San Lucas de Ocampo) (1,500), classified as rural.
