= Municipalities of Durango =

List of municipalities of Mexican state

Map of Mexico with Durango highlighted

Durango is a state in northwest Mexico that is divided into 39 municipalities. According to the 2020 INEGI census, Durango is the 25th most populous state with 1,832,650 inhabitants, but the 4th largest by land area spanning 123,575.36 square kilometres (47,712.71 sq mi). Durango has a population density of 14.8/km^{2} (38.4/sq mi), making it Mexico's second-lowest dense state, after Baja California Sur.

Municipalities in Durango are administratively autonomous of the state according to the 115th article of the 1917 Constitution of Mexico. Every three years, citizens elect a municipal president (Spanish: presidente municipal) by a plurality voting system who heads a concurrently elected municipal council (ayuntamiento) responsible for providing all the public services for their constituents. The municipal council consists of a variable number of trustees and councillors (regidores y síndicos). Municipalities are responsible for public services (such as water and sewerage), street lighting, public safety, traffic, and the maintenance of public parks, gardens and cemeteries. They may also assist the state and federal governments in education, emergency fire and medical services, environmental protection and maintenance of monuments and historical landmarks. Since 1984, they have had the power to collect property taxes and user fees, although more funds are obtained from the state and federal governments than from their own income.

The largest municipality by population is the state capital Durango, with 688,697 residents or approximately 35.7% of the state population. The smallest municipality by population is San Pedro del Gallo with 1,633 residents. The largest municipality by land area is also Durango which spans 9,306.43 km^{2} (3,593.23 sq mi), and the smallest is Vicente Guerrero which spans 370.56 km^{2} (143.08 sq mi). Most municipalities were incorporated upon the division of the state of Durango into municipal units by the Constitución Política del Estado Libre de Durango on September 1, 1825, shortly after the state was admitted to the Union. The most recent municipality to incorporate is Nuevo Ideal, on January 1, 1989.

== Municipalities ==
Largest municipalities in Durango by population

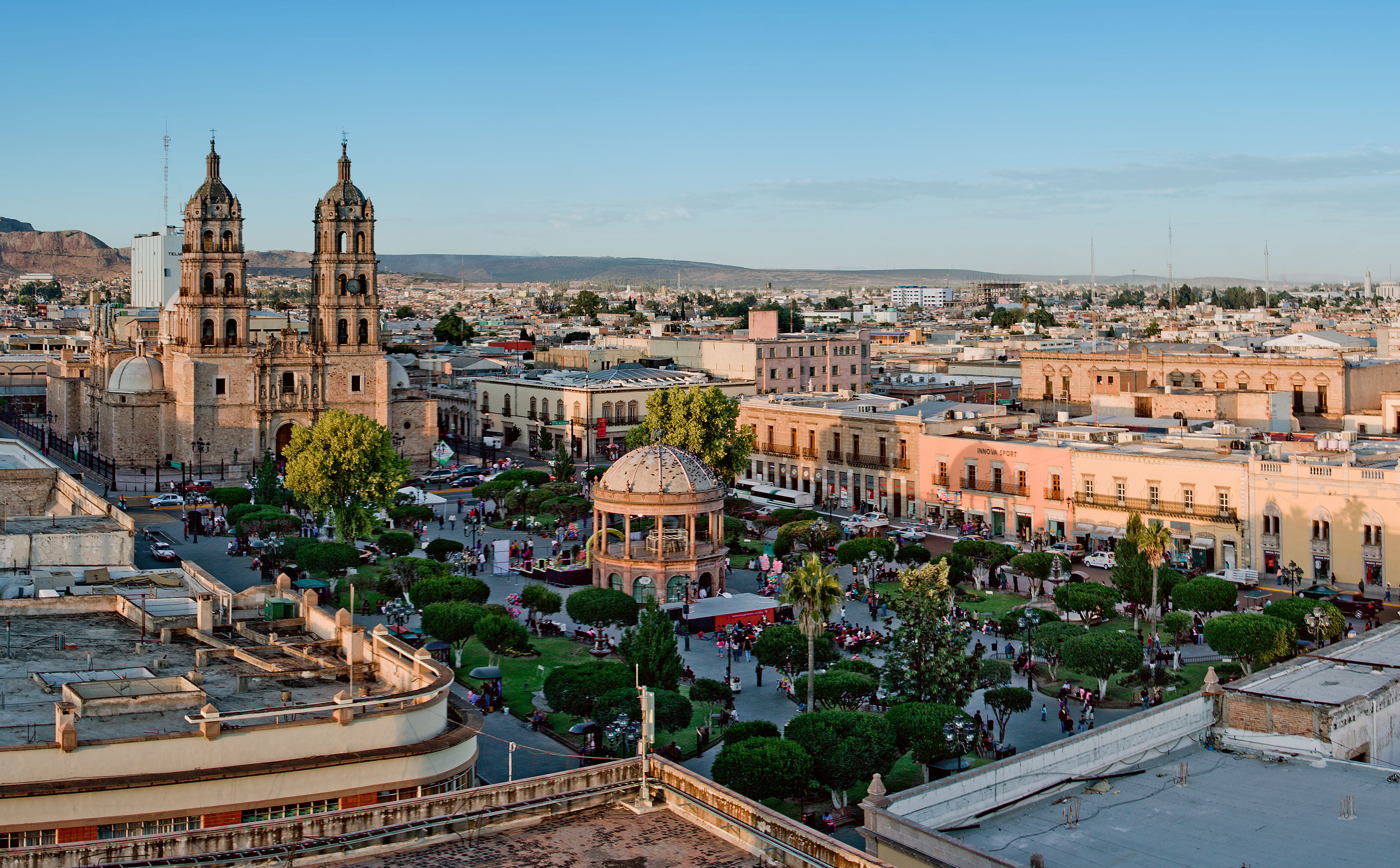
Durango, capital and largest municipality in the state.

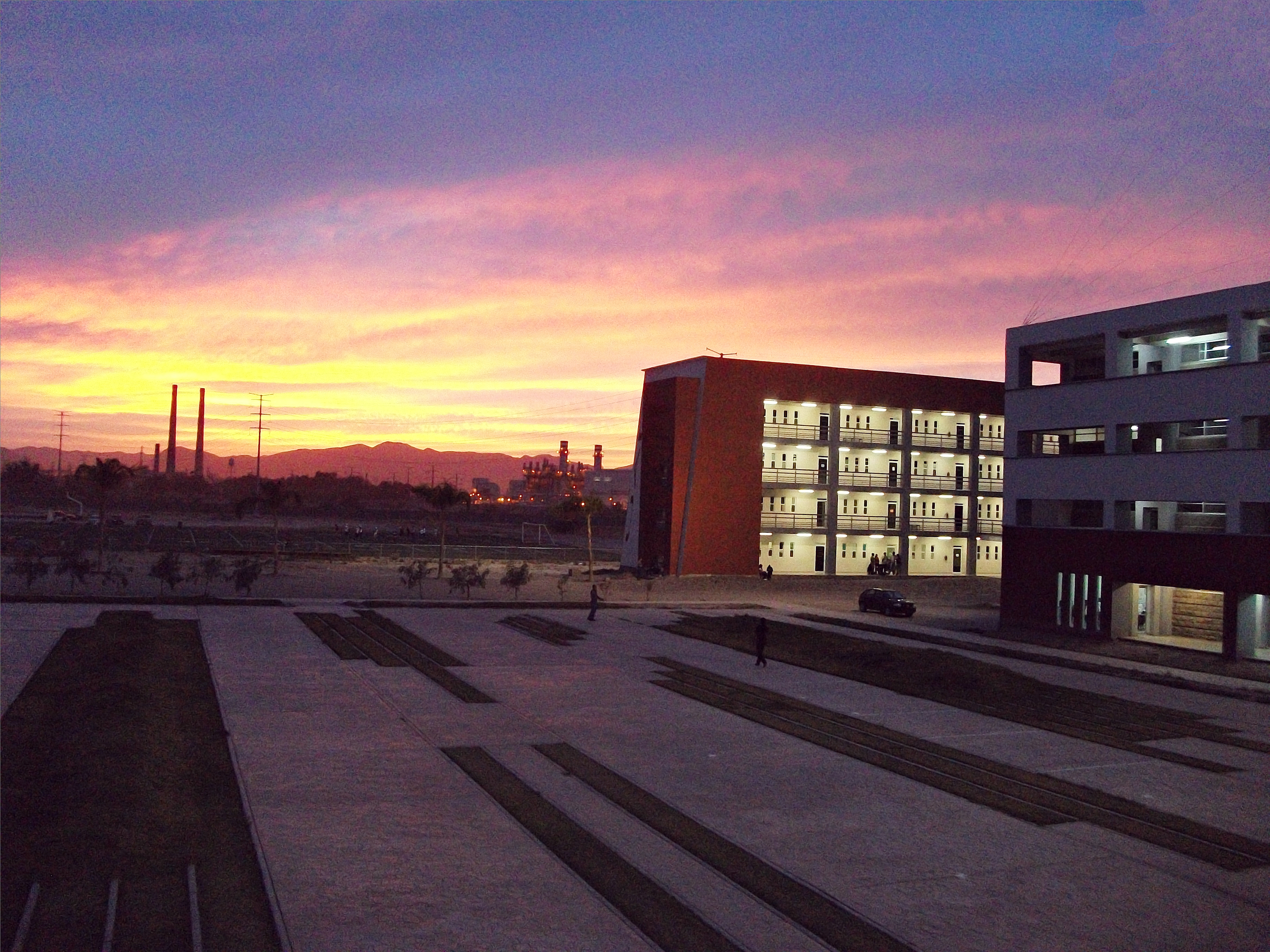
Gómez Palacio, second largest municipality.

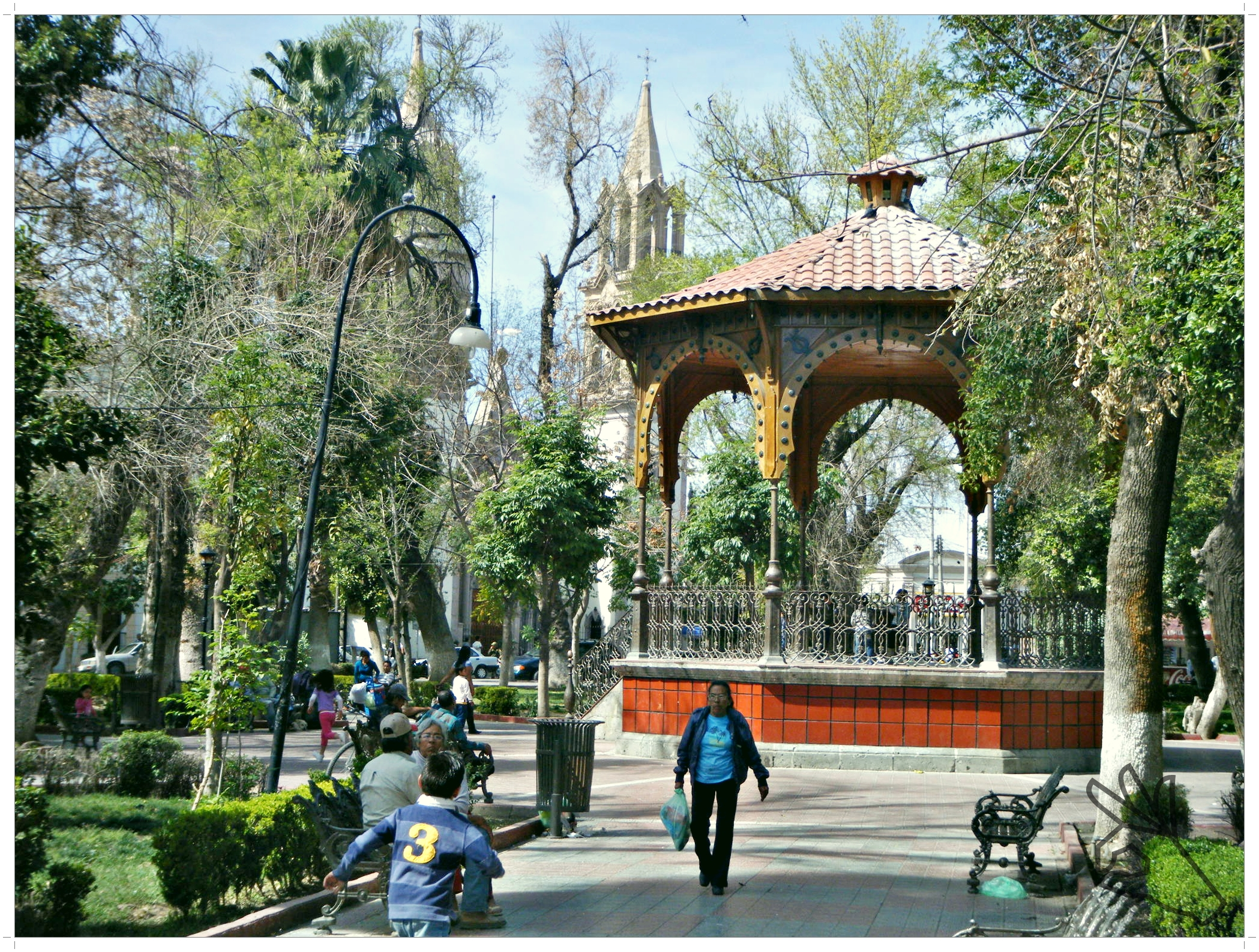
Lerdo, third largest municipality.

† State capital

Municipalities of Durango
Name	Municipal seat	Population (2020)	Population (2010)	Change	Land area		Population density (2020)	Incorporation date
Name	Municipal seat	Population (2020)	Population (2010)	Change	km^{2}	sq mi	Population density (2020)	Incorporation date
Canatlán	Ciudad Canatlán	31,454	31,401	+0.2%	3,499.56	1,351.19	9.0/km^{2} (23.3/sq mi)	September 1, 1825
Canelas	Canelas	4,321	4,122	+4.8%	894.41	345.33	4.8/km^{2} (12.5/sq mi)	September 1, 1825
Coneto de Comonfort	Coneto de Comonfort	4,084	4,530	−9.8%	1,076.71	415.72	3.8/km^{2} (9.8/sq mi)	September 1, 1825
Cuencamé	Cuencamé de Ceniceros	34,955	33,664	+3.8%	5,360.82	2,069.82	6.5/km^{2} (16.9/sq mi)	September 1, 1825
Durango†	Victoria de Durango	688,697	582,267	+18.3%	9,306.43	3,593.23	74.0/km^{2} (191.7/sq mi)	September 1, 1825
El Oro	Santa María del Oro	10,384	11,320	−8.3%	3,537.05	1,365.66	2.9/km^{2} (7.6/sq mi)	September 1, 1825
General Simón Bolívar (Note: General Simón Bolívar was originally incorporated as San Bartolo, changing its name on June 9, 1938.)	General Simón Bolívar	10,038	10,629	−5.6%	2,193.97	847.10	4.6/km^{2} (11.8/sq mi)	March 14, 1867
Gómez Palacio	Gómez Palacio	372,750	327,985	+13.6%	844.07	325.90	441.6/km^{2} (1,143.8/sq mi)	December 20, 1905
Guadalupe Victoria	Ciudad Guadalupe Victoria	36,695	34,052	+7.8%	1,320.00	509.65	27.8/km^{2} (72.0/sq mi)	April 1, 1936
Guanaceví	Guanaceví	9,869	10,149	−2.8%	5,448.23	2,103.57	1.8/km^{2} (4.7/sq mi)	September 1, 1825
Hidalgo (Note: Hidalgo was originally incorporated as Cerro Gordo, changing its name on May 1, 1927.)	Villa Hidalgo	3,843	4,265	−9.9%	4,698.54	1,814.12	0.8/km^{2} (2.1/sq mi)	September 1, 1825
Indé	Indé	4,748	5,280	−10.1%	2,510.02	969.12	1.9/km^{2} (4.9/sq mi)	September 1, 1825
Lerdo	Ciudad Lerdo	163,313	141,043	+15.8%	2,152.00	830.89	75.9/km^{2} (196.6/sq mi)	September 1, 1825
Mapimí	Mapimí	26,932	25,137	+7.1%	7,744.60	2,990.21	3.5/km^{2} (9.0/sq mi)	September 1, 1825
Mezquital	Mezquital	48,583	33,396	+45.5%	8,393.79	3,240.86	5.8/km^{2} (15.0/sq mi)	September 1, 1825
Nazas	Nazas	12,894	12,411	+3.9%	2,392.35	923.69	5.4/km^{2} (14.0/sq mi)	September 1, 1825
Nombre de Dios	Nombre de Dios	19,060	18,488	+3.1%	1,188.60	458.92	16.0/km^{2} (41.5/sq mi)	September 1, 1825
Nuevo Ideal	Nuevo Ideal	27,981	26,092	+7.2%	1,855.56	716.44	15.1/km^{2} (39.1/sq mi)	January 1, 1989
Ocampo (Note: Ocampo was originally incorporated as San Miguel de las Bocas, changing its name on May 1, 1927.)	Villa Ocampo	8,003	9,626	−16.9%	3,650.61	1,409.51	2.2/km^{2} (5.7/sq mi)	September 1, 1825
Otáez	Otáez	4,924	5,208	−5.5%	1,713.58	661.62	2.9/km^{2} (7.4/sq mi)	November 8, 1853
Pánuco de Coronado	Francisco I. Madero	12,656	11,927	+6.1%	1,028.42	397.08	12.3/km^{2} (31.9/sq mi)	November 21, 1847
Peñón Blanco	Peñón Blanco	11,118	10,473	+6.2%	1,687.19	651.43	6.6/km^{2} (17.1/sq mi)	September 1, 1825
Poanas	Villa Unión	25,623	24,918	+2.8%	1,130.02	436.30	22.7/km^{2} (58.7/sq mi)	November 21, 1847
Pueblo Nuevo	El Salto	51,269	49,162	+4.3%	6,960.77	2,687.57	7.4/km^{2} (19.1/sq mi)	September 1, 1825
Rodeo	Rodeo	12,818	12,788	+0.2%	1,435.87	554.39	8.9/km^{2} (23.1/sq mi)	February 1, 1859
San Bernardo	San Bernardo	2,837	3,433	−17.4%	2,311.52	892.48	1.2/km^{2} (3.2/sq mi)	September 1, 1825
San Dimas	Tayoltita	17,333	19,691	−12.0%	5,495.44	2,121.80	3.2/km^{2} (8.2/sq mi)	September 1, 1825
San Juan de Guadalupe	San Juan de Guadalupe	5,251	5,947	−11.7%	2,414.87	932.39	2.2/km^{2} (5.6/sq mi)	November 14, 1847
San Juan del Río	San Juan del Río	12,013	11,855	+1.3%	1,402.41	541.47	8.6/km^{2} (22.2/sq mi)	September 1, 1825
San Luis del Cordero	San Luis del Cordero	2,103	2,181	−3.6%	605.98	233.97	3.5/km^{2} (9.0/sq mi)	April 11, 1867
San Pedro del Gallo	San Pedro del Gallo	1,633	1,709	−4.4%	1,800.49	695.17	0.9/km^{2} (2.3/sq mi)	September 1, 1825
Santa Clara	Santa Clara	6,727	7,003	−3.9%	987.43	381.25	6.8/km^{2} (17.6/sq mi)	March 14, 1867
Santiago Papasquiaro	Santiago Papasquiaro	49,207	44,966	+9.4%	6,416.25	2,477.33	7.7/km^{2} (19.9/sq mi)	September 1, 1825
Súchil	Súchil	6,917	6,761	+2.3%	1,471.77	568.25	4.7/km^{2} (12.2/sq mi)	November 21, 1847
Tamazula	Tamazula de Victoria	26,300	26,368	−0.3%	5,812.84	2,244.35	4.5/km^{2} (11.7/sq mi)	September 1, 1825
Tepehuanes	Santa Catarina de Tepehuanes	11,378	10,745	+5.9%	6,081.34	2,348.02	1.9/km^{2} (4.8/sq mi)	September 1, 1825
Tlahualilo	Tlahualilo de Zaragoza	21,143	22,244	−4.9%	4,750.33	1,834.11	4.5/km^{2} (11.5/sq mi)	November 22, 1936
Topia	Topia	9,320	8,581	+8.6%	1,630.96	629.72	5.7/km^{2} (14.8/sq mi)	September 1, 1825
Vicente Guerrero	Vicente Guerrero	23,476	21,117	+11.2%	370.56	143.08	63.4/km^{2} (164.1/sq mi)	January 1, 1953
Durango	—	1,832,650	1,632,934	+12.2%	123,575.36	47,712.71	14.8/km^{2} (38.4/sq mi)	—
Mexico	—	126,014,024	112,336,538	+12.2%	1,972,550	761,606	63.9/km^{2} (165.5/sq mi)	—
