= 2nd federal electoral district of Durango =

Federal electoral district of Mexico

Durango's 2nd
- Electoral district of the Chamber of Deputies of Mexico

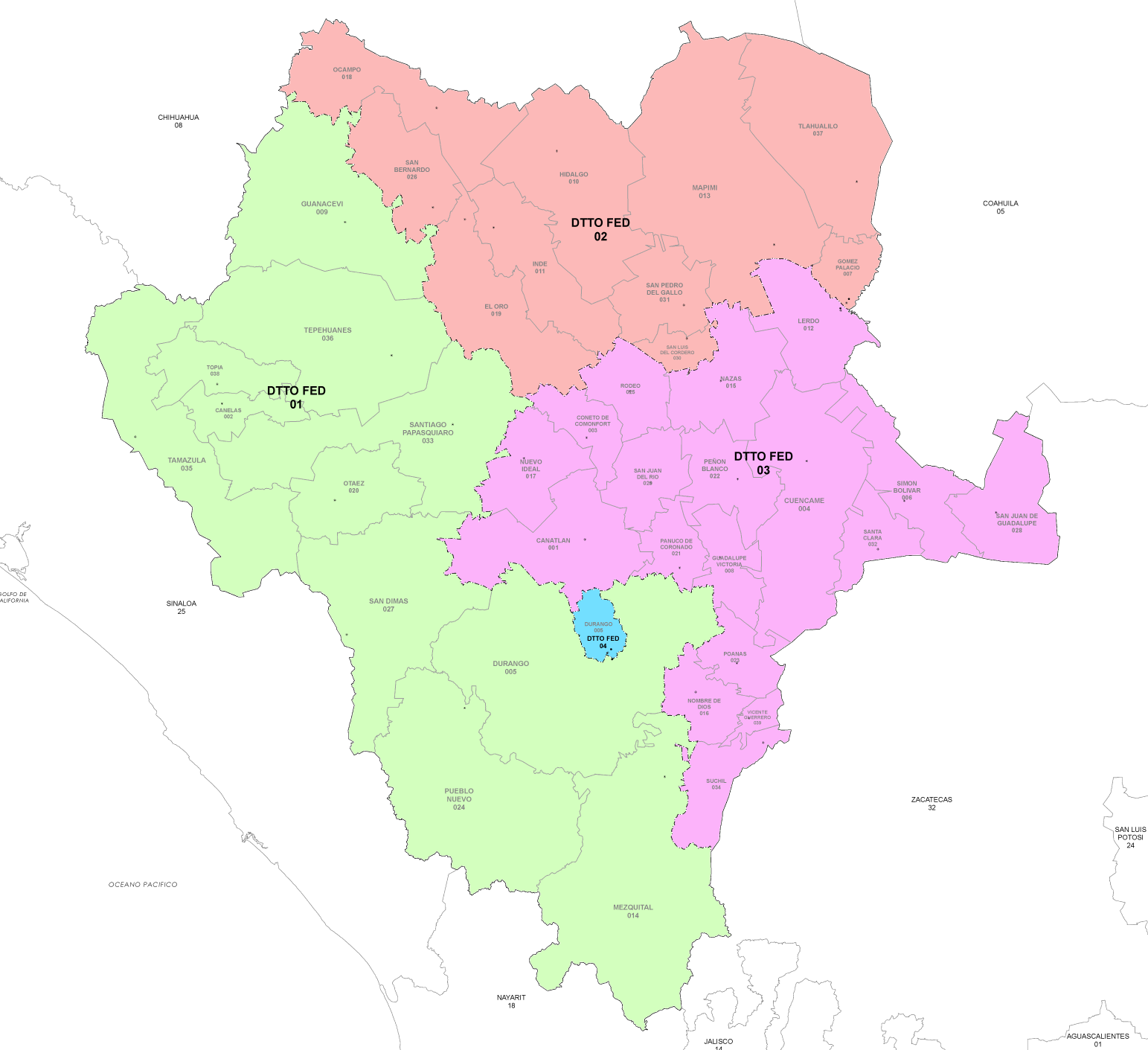
- 2nd district since 2023

Incumbent
- Member: Betzabé Martínez Arango
- Party: ▌Morena
- Congress: 66th (2024–2027)

District
- State: Durango
- Head town: Gómez Palacio
- Coordinates: 25°34′N 103°29′W
- Covers: 10 municipalities: Gómez Palacio, Hidalgo, Indé, Mapimí, Ocampo, El Oro, San Bernardo, San Luis del Cordero, San Pedro del Gallo, Tlahualilo
- PR region: First
- Precincts: 335
- Population: 454,368 (2020 census)

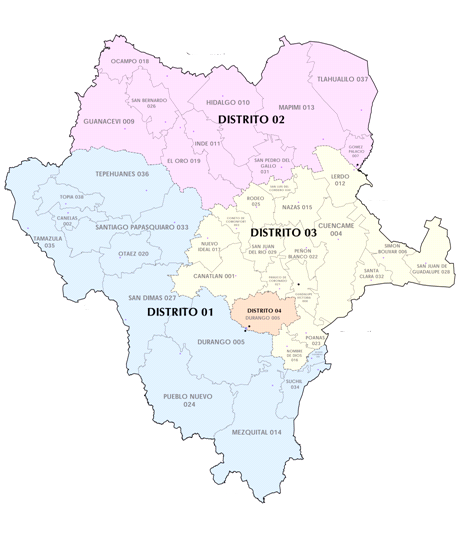
Durango under the 2017–2022 districting plan

The 2nd federal electoral district of Durango (Spanish: Distrito electoral federal 02 de Durango) is one of the 300 electoral districts into which Mexico is divided for elections to the federal Chamber of Deputies and one of four such districts in the state of Durango.

It elects one deputy to the lower house of Congress for each three-year legislative session by means of the first-past-the-post system. Votes cast in the district also count towards the calculation of proportional representation ("plurinominal") deputies elected from the first region.

The current member for the district, elected in the 2024 general election, is Betzabé Martínez Arango. Originally elected for the Labour Party (PT), she switched allegiance to the National Regeneration Movement (Morena) on 19 September 2024.

== District territory ==
Under the 2023 districting plan adopted by the National Electoral Institute (INE), which is to be used for the 2024, 2027 and 2030 federal elections, the 2nd district covers 335 electoral precincts (secciones electorales) across 10 municipalities in the north of the state:

- Gómez Palacio, Hidalgo, Indé, Mapimí, Ocampo, El Oro, San Bernardo, San Luis del Cordero, San Pedro del Gallo and Tlahualilo.

The head town (cabecera distrital), where results from individual polling stations are gathered together and tallied, is the city of Gómez Palacio. The district reported a population of 454,368 in the 2020 census.

== Previous districting schemes ==
Evolution of electoral district numbers
	1974	1978	1996	2005	2017	2023
Durango	4	6	5	4	4	4
Chamber of Deputies	196	300				

2017–2022

Between 2017 and 2022, the 2nd district's head town was at Gómez Palacio and it covered 10 municipalities in practically the same configuration as in 2023:
- Gómez Palacio, Hidalgo, Indé, Mapimí, Ocampo, El Oro, San Bernardo, San Pedro del Gallo and Tlahualilo, as in 2023, but with San Luis del Cordero replaced by Guanaceví.

2005–2017

Under the 2005 plan, Durango's single-member district count fell from five to four. This district's head town was at Gómez Palacio and it covered two municipalities:
- Gómez Palacio and Lerdo.

1996–2005

In the 1996 scheme, Durango's seats were reduced from six to five. The 2nd district had its head town at Gómez Palacio and it comprised four municipalities:
- Gómez Palacio, Hidalgo, Mapimí and Tlahualilo.

1978–1996

The districting scheme in force from 1978 to 1996 was the result of the 1977 electoral reforms, which increased the number of single-member seats in the Chamber of Deputies from 196 to 300. Under that plan, Durango's seat allocation rose from four to six. The reconfigured 2nd district covered two municipalities:
- Gómez Palacio (head town) and Tlahualilo.

== Deputies returned to Congress ==
(Mexico) National parties
- Current
- PAN
- PRI
- PT
- PVEM
- MC
- Morena
- PAZ
- Somos
- Defunct or local only
- PLM
- PNR
- PRM
- PNM
- PP
- PPS
- PARM
- PFCRN
- CON
- PANAL
- PSD
- PES
- PES
- PRD

Durango's 2nd district
Election	Deputy	Party	Term	Legislature
1916	Rafael Espeleta		1916–1917	Constituent Congress of Querétaro
1917	Francisco Arreola R.		1917–1918	27th Congress
1918	Alfredo Breceda Mercado		1918–1920	28th Congress
1920	Ignacio Borrego		1920–1922	29th Congress
1922	Lorenzo Gámiz		1922–1924	30th Congress
1924	Salvador Reyes Avilés		1924–1926	31st Congress
1926	Pedro Álvarez		1926–1928	32nd Congress; 33rd Congress
1928	Pedro Álvarez		1928–1930	33rd Congress
1930	Liborio Espinosa y Elenes		1930–1932	34th Congress
1932	Dionisio Ortiz Acosta	Institutional Revolutionary Party	1932–1934	35th Congress
1934	Roberto López Franco	Institutional Revolutionary Party	1934–1937	36th Congress
1937	Tomás Palomino Rojas		1937–1940	37th Congress
1940	Mariano Padilla		1940–1943	38th Congress
1943	Miguel Breceda		1943–1946	39th Congress
1946	J. Encarnación Chávez	Institutional Revolutionary Party	1946–1949	40th Congress
1949	Carlos Real Jr	Institutional Revolutionary Party	1949–1952	41st Congress
1952	Enrique Dupré Ceniceros	Institutional Revolutionary Party	1952–1955	42nd Congress
1955	Manuel Garcia Santibáñez	Institutional Revolutionary Party	1955–1958	43rd Congress
1958	Francisco Torres García	Institutional Revolutionary Party	1958–1961	44th Congress
1961	Gonzalo Salas Rodríguez	Institutional Revolutionary Party	1961–1964	45th Congress
1964	Jesús José Reyes Acevedo Soto	Institutional Revolutionary Party	1964–1967	46th Congress
1967	J. Natividad Ibarra Rayas	Institutional Revolutionary Party	1967–1970	47th Congress
1970	Manuel Esquivel Gámez	Institutional Revolutionary Party	1970–1973	48th Congress
1973	Jesús José Gamero Gamero	Institutional Revolutionary Party	1973–1976	49th Congress
1976	Maximiliano Silerio Esparza	Institutional Revolutionary Party	1976–1979	50th Congress
1979	Eduardo López Faudoa	Institutional Revolutionary Party	1979–1982	51st Congress
1982	Jesús Ibarra Rayas	Institutional Revolutionary Party	1982–1985	52nd Congress
1985	Cristóbal Julián García Ramírez	Institutional Revolutionary Party	1985–1988	53rd Congress
1988	J. Natividad Ibarra Rayas	Institutional Revolutionary Party	1988–1991	54th Congress
1991	José Miguel Castro Carrillo	Institutional Revolutionary Party	1991–1994	55th Congress
1994	Sabino González Alba	Institutional Revolutionary Party	1994–1997	56th Congress
1997	Francisco Javier Ponce Ortega	Institutional Revolutionary Party	1997–2000	57th Congress
2000	Francisco Raúl Ramírez Ávila	National Action Party (Mexico)	2000–2003	58th Congress
2003	Rosario Sáenz López	Institutional Revolutionary Party	2003–2006	59th Congress
2006	Juana Leticia Herrera Ale	Institutional Revolutionary Party	2006–2009	60th Congress
2009	Ricardo Rebollo Mendoza	Institutional Revolutionary Party	2009–2012	61st Congress
2012	Marina Vitela Rodríguez	Institutional Revolutionary Party	2012–2015	62nd Congress
2015	María del Rocío Rebollo Mendoza	Institutional Revolutionary Party	2015–2018	63rd Congress
2018	Marina Vitela Rodríguez (Note: Vitela Rodríguez resigned her seat in 2019 to contend (successfully) for the mayoralty of Gómez Palacio.); Lourdes Montes Hernández	National Regeneration Movement	2018–2019; 2019–2021	64th Congress
2021	Omar Castañeda González	National Regeneration Movement	2021–2024	65th Congress
2024	Betzabé Martínez Arango (Note: Martínez Arango switched allegiance from the Labour Party to Morena on 19 September 2024.)	Labour Party (Mexico) National Regeneration Movement	2024–2027	66th Congress

== Presidential elections ==
Durango's 2nd district
Election	District won by	Party or coalition	%
2018	Andrés Manuel López Obrador	Juntos Haremos Historia	53.4324
2024	Claudia Sheinbaum Pardo	Sigamos Haciendo Historia	64.6196
