= Inde (disambiguation) =

Inde is a small river in Belgium and Germany.

Inde may also refer to:

- IndE, Indian English
- Indé, the municipal seat of Indé Municipality
- Indé Municipality in Durango, Mexico
- INDE Racing
