= Vicente Guerrero (disambiguation) =

Vicente Guerrero was the second president of independent Mexico.

Vicente Guerrero may also refer to:

== Places ==
In Mexico;

- Vicente Guerrero, Baja California
- Vicente Guerrero, Chihuahua
- Vicente Guerrero, Durango
- Vicente Guerrero, Mexicali also known as Los Algodones
- Vicente Guerrero, Puebla
- Vicente Guerrero Municipality, Durango
- Vicente Guerrero, Tlaxcala

== See also ==
- Guerrero (disambiguation)
