= Nombre de Dios, Durango =

City in the Mexican state of Durango

- Municipal Seat and City
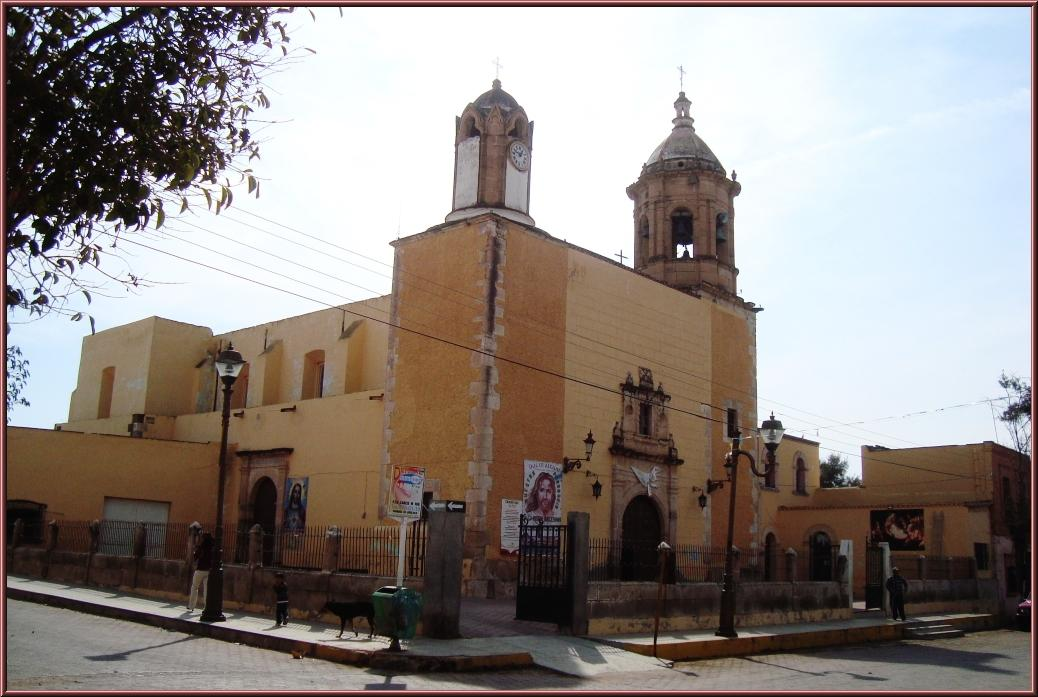
- Parish church of Saint Peter the Apostle

- Location in Mexico
- Coordinates: 23°51′N 104°14′W
- Country: Mexico
- State: Durango
- Municipality: Nombre de Dios
- Established: November 17, 1562
- Elevation: 1,750 m (5,740 ft)

Population (2015)
  - Municipal Seat and City: 5,302
  - Metro: 19,694

Nombre de Dios is a city and seat of the municipality of Nombre de Dios, established as Pueblo Mágico on October 11, 2018, in the state of Durango, north-western Mexico. As of 2015, the town of Nombre de Dios had a population of 5,302.

Nombre de Dios is the oldest town in Northern Mexico, founded by Francisco de Ibarra in November 17, 1562.

== Geography ==
Nombre de Dios is located at southeast of state's capital, Victoria de Durango, in coordinates 23°51' N and 104°51'' E. It limits north with municipalities of Durango and Poanas; south, El Mezquital and Súchil; east with Vicente Guerrero and Poanas and west with Durango and El Mezquital.
