= Súchil =

City in the Mexican state of Durango

- Municipal seat and city
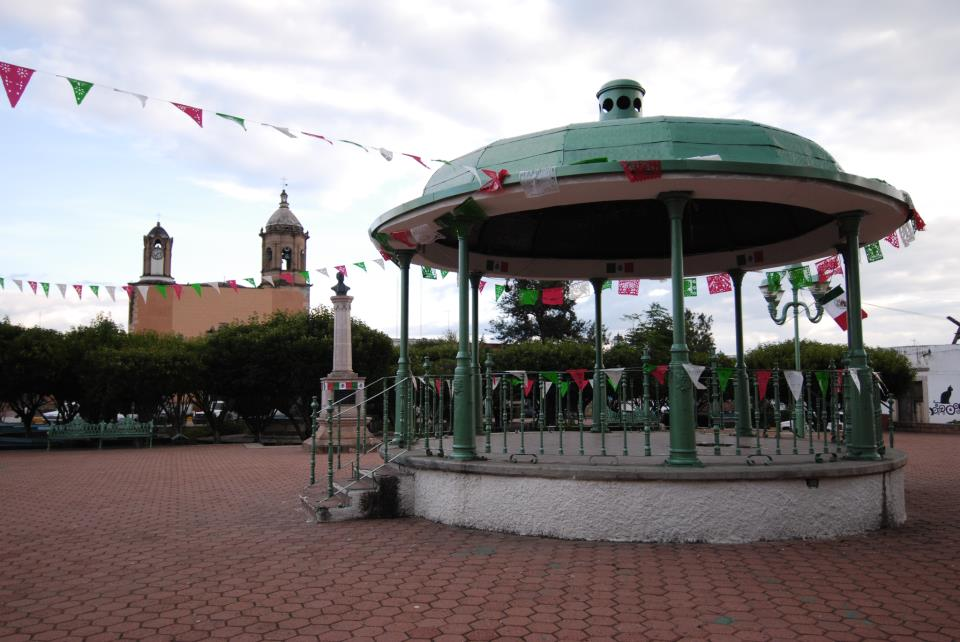
- Downtown Súchil

- Location in Mexico
- Coordinates: 23°38′N 103°55′W
- Country: Mexico
- State: Durango
- Municipality: Súchil

Population (2010)
  - Total: 4,107

Súchil is a city and seat of the municipality of Súchil, in the state of Durango, north-western Mexico. As of 2010, the town of Súchil had a population of 4,107.

== Geography ==
Súchil is located in the southeast region of Durango, its boundaries are to the north with the municipality of Vicente Guerrero and with the municipality of Nombre de Dios, and to the west and south with the municipality of Mezquital, to the east and southeast it borders with the Zacatecan municipalities of Sombrerete, Chalchihuites and Jiménez del Teúl.

The land area of Súchil is 822.9 km^{2}.

=== Orography and hydrography ===
Súchil is a mountainous municipality, the main mountain range is the Sierra Michis, a branch of the Sierra Madre Occidental that runs through the municipality in a north-south direction marking the border with the state of Zacatecas, the main elevations of the municipality are the Cerro del Jacal, the Cerro de la Gallina and the Cerro El Papantón.

The main river stream of the municipality is the Graceros River, which rises in the Sierra Michis and heads north, in addition to coming from Zacatecas there is the Súchil River, of which the Chalchihuites Stream is a tributary; the southern end of the municipal territory belongs to the Huaynamota River Basin and the Lerma-Santiago Hydrological Region, while all the rest of the territory is part of the San Pedro River Basin and the Presidio-San Pedro Hydrological Region.

=== Climate and ecosystems ===
The northern area of Súchil has a Semi-dry temperate climate, while in the rest of the municipality the climate is classified as Sub-humid temperate with summer rainfall; in the same way, the average annual temperature recorded in the northern area ranges from 16 to 18°C and in the remaining territory is 12 to 16°C; Finally, the average rainfall in the northern area is 500 to 600 mm and the entire remaining municipality is 600 to 700 mm.

Climate data for Súchil (1991–2020)
Month	Jan	Feb	Mar	Apr	May	Jun	Jul	Aug	Sep	Oct	Nov	Dec	Year
Record high °C (°F)	30 (86)	35 (95)	35 (95)	42 (108)	39 (102)	38 (100)	36 (97)	38 (100)	39 (102)	37 (99)	32 (90)	33 (91)	42 (108)
Mean daily maximum °C (°F)	18.1 (64.6)	20.6 (69.1)	22.3 (72.1)	25.3 (77.5)	28.5 (83.3)	28.1 (82.6)	26.2 (79.2)	25.7 (78.3)	24.1 (75.4)	22.3 (72.1)	20.1 (68.2)	17.5 (63.5)	23.2 (73.8)
Daily mean °C (°F)	9.6 (49.3)	11.7 (53.1)	13.4 (56.1)	15.8 (60.4)	18.9 (66.0)	20.4 (68.7)	19.2 (66.6)	18.8 (65.8)	17.6 (63.7)	15.1 (59.2)	12.2 (54.0)	9.9 (49.8)	15.2 (59.4)
Mean daily minimum °C (°F)	1.0 (33.8)	2.7 (36.9)	4.6 (40.3)	6.2 (43.2)	9.3 (48.7)	12.6 (54.7)	12.1 (53.8)	11.9 (53.4)	11.1 (52.0)	7.9 (46.2)	4.4 (39.9)	2.2 (36.0)	7.2 (45.0)
Record low °C (°F)	−11 (12)	−10 (14)	−6 (21)	−4 (25)	0 (32)	3 (37)	2.5 (36.5)	2.5 (36.5)	−1.5 (29.3)	−4 (25)	−9 (16)	−10 (14)	−11 (12)
Average precipitation mm (inches)	17.7 (0.70)	10.7 (0.42)	5.2 (0.20)	4.5 (0.18)	10.8 (0.43)	59.4 (2.34)	93.1 (3.67)	117.4 (4.62)	108.2 (4.26)	26.4 (1.04)	15.8 (0.62)	7.7 (0.30)	476.9 (18.78)
Average precipitation days (≥ 0.1 mm)	2.2	1.4	0.7	0.4	2.0	7.4	11.1	12.2	10.2	2.8	2.2	1.6	54.2
Source: Servicio Meteorologico Nacional

Practically the entire municipality is covered by forests, except for its northeastern end where the territory is dedicated to agriculture, the main species found in the forest are pine and oak. To protect and preserve this important forested area, the southern end of the municipality is part of the La Michilía Biosphere Reserve, which extends into the neighboring municipality of Mezquital.

The main animal species that can be found in the municipality of Súchil are coyote, rabbit, squirrel, skunk, wild ducks, some species of smaller birds and in the Biosphere Reserve wolf, deer and wild boar.
