= Gómez Palacio (disambiguation) =

Francisco Gómez Palacio y Bravo (1824 — 1886) was a Mexican politician.

Gómez Palacio may also refer to:

- Gómez Palacio Municipality, Durango
- Gómez Palacio, Durango
