= Hidalgo Municipality =

Hidalgo Municipality may refer to the following municipalities in Mexico:

- Hidalgo Municipality, Coahuila
- Hidalgo Municipality, Michoacán - Municipal seat: Ciudad Hidalgo, Michoacán
- Hidalgo Municipality, Durango
- Hidalgo Municipality, Tamaulipas

See also

- Hidalgo (disambiguation)
