= Rebollo (surname) =

Rebollo is a Spanish surname. Notable people with the surname include:

- Alejandro Rebollo (born 1983), Spanish footballer
- Alejandro Rebollo Álvarez-Amandi (1934–2015), Spanish politician, civil servant and lawyer
- Antonio Rebollo (born 1955), Spanish Paralympic archer
- Dani Rebollo (born 1999), Spanish footballer
- Francisco Rebollo López (1938–2025), Puerto Rican jurist
- José Luis Rebollo (born 1972), Spanish racing cyclist
- Manuel Rebollo García (born 1945), Spanish Navy officer
- Mario Rebollo (born 1964), Uruguayan football player and coach
- Ricardo Rebollo Mendoza (born 1969), Mexican politician
- Roberto Rebollo Vivero (born 1957), Mexican politician

== See also ==
- Rebolo, another surname
- Facundo Pellistri Rebollo (born 2001), Uruguayan footballer
- Jesús Gutiérrez Rebollo (1934–2013), Mexican military general
- Pablo Moreno Rebollo (born 1963), Spanish racing cyclist
