= El Oro Municipality =

El Oro Municipality may refer to:

- El Oro Municipality, Mexico State, a municipality in the State of Mexico, Mexico
- El Oro Municipality, Durango, a municipality in Durango, Mexico
