= Vitela =

Vitela is an Italian surname, meaning “Veal” (young calf), with origins in Northern Italy. However, Italian immigrants carried it to various parts of the Americas. Variants include: Vitella, Vitello, Vitelli, Vitale.

Notable people with this surname (and its variants) include:

- Alma Marina Vitela (born 1965), Mexican nurse and politician, a member of the Morena party
- Rodolfo Vitela (born 1949), Mexican former cyclist
- Gino Vitella: A track and field athlete who competes in shot put and discus. He holds the record in discus for Oakland University.
