= Coneto de Comonfort Municipality =

Municipality in the Mexican state of Durango

Coneto de Comonfort
- Municipality
- Municipality of Coneto de Comonfort in Durango

- Location in Mexico
- Coordinates: 24°58′31″N 104°46′19″W
- Country: Mexico
- State: Durango
- Municipal seat: Coneto de Comonfort

Area
  - Total: 1,324.9 km^{2} (511.5 sq mi)

Population (2015)
  - Total: 4,390
- Time zone: UTC-6 (Zona Centro)

Coneto de Comonfort is a municipality in the Mexican state of Durango. The municipal seat lies at Coneto de Comonfort. The municipality covers an area of 1324.9 km^{2}. As of 2015, the municipality had a total population of 4,390. The town of Coneto de Comonfort has a population of 858. Other than the town of Coneto de Comonfort, the municipality had 64 localities, the largest of which (with 2010 population in parentheses) was: Nogales (1,117), classified as rural.
