= Alma Marina Vitela =

Mexican politician

Marina Vitela
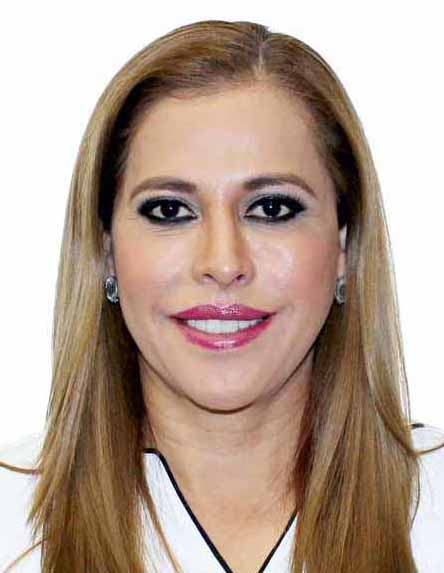
- Marina Vitela Rodriguez

Mayor of Gómez Palacio, Durango
- In office 1 September 2019 – 7 November 2021
- Preceded by: Leticia Herrera Ale
- Succeeded by: Anabel Gutiérrez Ibarra

Personal details
- Born: 26 December 1965 (age 59); Gómez Palacio, Durango, Mexico
- Political party: Movimiento Regeneración Nacional (since 2018); Partido Revolucionario Institucional (2001–2017)

Alma Marina Vitela Rodríguez (born 26 December 1965) is a Mexican nurse and politician, a member of the Morena party. She has served as the mayor of Gómez Palacio, Durango, and ran (unsuccessfully) for Governor of Durango in the state election in June 2022.

== Early life ==
Vitela was born into a family with seven siblings and was orphaned at a young age.

== Political career ==
Vitela received a technical nursing degree in 1984 and worked as a nurse in the ISSSTE and IMSS systems and for the Mexican Red Cross; while a nurse, she also was a labor union representative in multiple ISSSTE facilities. Her first political posts came as a member of the Partido Revolucionario Institucional (PRI); she served two nonconsecutive terms as a state deputy to the Congress of Durango, from 2001 to 2004 and 2007 to 2010. During the latter term, she concurrently served as a director of the National PRI Women's Organization (ONMPRI). She also was the general secretary, the second-highest position in the PRI in Durango, from 2009 to 2012, coinciding with a two-year stint as Gómez Palacio city councilor.

Vitela was elected to the Chamber of Deputies the second district of Durango in the 2012 general election. She was a secretary on the Health Commission and also sat on commissions for Metropolitan Development, Social Security, and Special Commission for Social Programs. After her three-year term, she returned to the Durango state legislature from 2016 to 2018.

Vitela changed parties from the PRI to Morena in 2018. In that year's election, Gómez Palacio voters in the second district reelected her to the Chamber of Deputies, where she served during the first six months of the 65th Congress. She resigned from the federal legislature in March 2019 in order to run for mayor of Gómez Palacio, winning election and serving from 2019 to 2021. She was the first non-PRI mayor of the city.

In November 2021, Vitela resigned as mayor in order to pursue the Morena nomination for Governor of Durango in the 2022 state elections. The party selected her from among six contenders for the nomination the following month, but she ultimately lost to Esteban Villegas of the PRI.

In the 2024 general election, Vitela was elected to a plurinominal seat in the Chamber of Deputies.

== Personal life ==
Vitela has three children.
