= Rebolo =

Rebolo is a surname. Notable people with the surname include:

- Francisco Rebolo (1902–1980), Brazilian painter and footballer
- Rafael Rebolo López (born 1961), Spanish astrophysicist
- Wilton Rebolo (born 1995), Brazilian rugby union player

== See also ==
- Rebollo (surname), another surname
