= San Francisco del Mezquital =

City in the Mexican state of Durango

- Municipal seat and city
- Location in Mexico
- Coordinates: 23°28′24″N 104°23′45″W
- Country: Mexico
- State: Durango
- Municipality: Mezquital

Population (2010)
  - Total: 1,742

Mezquital (Southeastern Tepehuan: Boodamtam) is a city and seat of the Municipality of Mezquital in the state of Durango north-western Mexico. It is situated on the San Pedro Mezquital River in the northeast of the municipality, near the boundary with the Municipality of Suchil. As of 2010, the town had a population of 1,742.

There is uncertainty as to the official name of this municipal capital. According to an online encyclopedia of Mexico's municipalities produced by the federal Secretariat of Governance, the name of this city is simply Mezquital, but the federal postal service gives San Francisco del Mezquital, which is the name of the second convent founded in the vicinity during the colonial era.
