= Carlos Herrera Araluce =

Mexican politician

- Born: 24 January 1936; Chilchota, Michoacán, Mexico
- Died: 2 March 2016 (aged 80); Torreón, Coahuila, Mexico
- Occupation: Politician
- Political party: PRI
- Spouse: Vilma Ale
- Children: 3

Carlos Antonio Herrera Araluce (24 January 1936 – 2 March 2016) was a Mexican businessman and politician affiliated with the Institutional Revolutionary Party. He served as Deputy of the LIX Legislature of the Mexican Congress representing Durango. He was also municipal president of Gómez Palacio from 1974 to 1977.

== Early life and business career ==
Herrera Araluce was born in Chilchota, Michoacán, on 24 January 1936 to Ernesto Herrera Zavala and María de la Luz Araluce, though the family moved to Gómez Palacio, Durango when he was two years old. In 1968, he founded Chilchota Alimentos, a food production company focused on cheese, and later invested in the hotel and restaurant industries. Herrera Araluce served as leader of the Federación de Trabajadores de Durango (Federation of Workers of Durango).

== Political career ==
Herrera Araluce served as the municipal president of Gómez Palacio from 1974 to 1977. During his term, he was one of the main proponents of the Lagunero Industrial Park. Herrera Araluce served a second term as municipal president from 1998 to 2001 and was succeeded by his daughter, Leticia Herrera Alé.

== Personal life ==
Herrera Araluce and his wife, Vilma Alé, had three children: Leticia, Ernesto, and Carlos Manuel. The couple survived an assassination attempt when they were ambushed in Torreón in May 2007; they both suffered gunshot wounds.

Herrera Araluce died in Torreón on 2 March 2016.
