= Rosario Sáenz López =

Mexican politician

- Born: Durango, Mexico
- Occupation: Politician
- Political party: PRI

Rosario Sáenz López is a Mexican politician affiliated with the Institutional Revolutionary Party. As of 2014 she served as Deputy of the LIX Legislature of the Mexican Congress representing Durango as replacement of Carlos Herrera Araluce.
