= San Pedro del Gallo Municipality =

Municipality in the Mexican state of Durango

San Pedro del Gallo
- Municipality
- Municipality of San Luis del Cordero in Durango

- Location in Mexico
- Coordinates: 25°33′45″N 104°17′33″W
- Country: Mexico
- State: Durango
- Municipal seat: San Luis del Cordero

Area
  - Total: 2,008.3 km^{2} (775.4 sq mi)

Population (2010)
  - Total: 1,709
  - Density: 0.8510/km^{2} (2.204/sq mi)
- Time zone: UTC-6 (Zona Centro)

San Pedro del Gallo is a municipality in the Mexican state of Durango. The municipal seat lies at San Pedro del Gallo. The municipality covers an area of 2,008.3 km^{2}.

As of 2010, the municipality had a total population of 1,709, up from 1,486 as of 2005.

The municipality had 73 localities, none of which had a population over 1,000.
