= Otáez Municipality =

Municipality in the Mexican state of Durango

Otáez
- Municipality
- Municipality of Otáez in Durango

- Location in Mexico
- Coordinates: 24°42′N 106°0′W
- Country: Mexico
- State: Durango
- Municipal seat: Otáez

Area
  - Total: 906.5 km^{2} (350.0 sq mi)

Population (2010)
  - Total: 5,208
  - Density: 5.745/km^{2} (14.88/sq mi)

Otáez is a municipality in the Mexican state of Durango. The municipal seat lies at Otáez. The municipality covers an area of 906.5 km^{2}.

As of 2010, the municipality had a total population of 5,208, up from 4,543 as of 2005.

Localities inside the municipality include El Bajío de Vacas, Los Cardos, Banome, San Pedro de Azafranes, and San Miguel de Pielagos.

The municipality had 106 localities, none of which had a population over 1,000.
