= San Bernardo, Durango =

City in the Mexican state of Durango

San Bernardo
- Municipal seat and city
- Location in Mexico
- Coordinates: 25°59′N 105°33′W
- Country: Mexico
- State: Durango
- Municipality: San Bernardo

Population (2010)
  - Total: 700

San Bernardo (also, Bernardo) is a city and seat of the municipality of San Bernardo in the state of Durango in Mexico. As of 2010, the town had a population of 700.

== Climate ==
Climate data for San Bernardo (1991–2020)
Month	Jan	Feb	Mar	Apr	May	Jun	Jul	Aug	Sep	Oct	Nov	Dec	Year
Record high °C (°F)	32 (90)	37 (99)	37 (99)	40 (104)	42 (108)	44 (111)	43 (109)	40 (104)	39 (102)	38 (100)	35 (95)	34 (93)	44 (111)
Mean daily maximum °C (°F)	21.8 (71.2)	24.0 (75.2)	26.9 (80.4)	30.3 (86.5)	33.3 (91.9)	34.6 (94.3)	31.4 (88.5)	30.7 (87.3)	28.8 (83.8)	27.9 (82.2)	24.8 (76.6)	21.7 (71.1)	28.0 (82.4)
Daily mean °C (°F)	11.0 (51.8)	13.3 (55.9)	15.9 (60.6)	19.4 (66.9)	22.7 (72.9)	25.1 (77.2)	23.6 (74.5)	23.1 (73.6)	21.3 (70.3)	18.3 (64.9)	14.4 (57.9)	11.2 (52.2)	18.3 (64.9)
Mean daily minimum °C (°F)	0.2 (32.4)	2.7 (36.9)	4.9 (40.8)	8.4 (47.1)	12.1 (53.8)	15.7 (60.3)	15.8 (60.4)	15.5 (59.9)	13.8 (56.8)	8.8 (47.8)	3.9 (39.0)	0.6 (33.1)	8.5 (47.3)
Record low °C (°F)	−10 (14)	−16 (3)	−9 (16)	−4 (25)	2 (36)	6 (43)	0 (32)	10 (50)	3 (37)	−3 (27)	−9 (16)	−14 (7)	−16 (3)
Average precipitation mm (inches)	8.4 (0.33)	8.8 (0.35)	10.0 (0.39)	4.3 (0.17)	8.5 (0.33)	66.0 (2.60)	128.3 (5.05)	112.9 (4.44)	100.7 (3.96)	29.0 (1.14)	13.1 (0.52)	17.5 (0.69)	507.5 (19.98)
Average precipitation days (≥ 0.1 mm)	2.1	1.4	1.4	1.4	3.0	9.5	16.2	15.9	11.0	5.0	2.3	2.5	71.7
Source: Servicio Meteorologico Nacional
