= Nombre de Dios Municipality =

Municipality in the Mexican state of Durango

Nombre de Dios
- Municipality
- Location in Mexico
- Coordinates: 23°51′N 104°15′W
- Country: Mexico
- State: Durango
- Municipal seat: Nombre de Dios

Area
  - Total: 1,478.3 km^{2} (570.8 sq mi)

Population (2010)
  - Total: 18,488
  - Density: 12.506/km^{2} (32.391/sq mi)

Nombre de Dios is a municipality in the Mexican state of Durango. The municipal seat lies at Nombre de Dios. The municipality covers an area of 1,478.3 km^{2}.

As of 2010, the municipality had a total population of 18,488, up from 17,318 as of 2005.

As of 2010, the town of Nombre de Dios had a population of 5,302. Other than the town of Nombre de Dios, the municipality had 110 localities, the largest of which (with 2010 populations in parentheses) were: San José de la Parrilla (La Parrilla) (1,500), Gabriel Hernández (Mancinas) (1,256), and General Francisco Murguía (1,241), classified as rural.
