= Coneto de Comonfort =

Town in the Mexican state of Durango

- Municipal seat and city
- Location in Mexico
- Coordinates: 24°59′N 104°56′W
- Country: Mexico
- State: Durango
- Municipality: Coneto de Comonfort
- Elevation: 1,960 m (6,430 ft)

Population (2015)
  - Total: 858

Coneto de Comonfort is a town and seat of the municipality of Coneto de Comonfort, in the state of Durango, north-western Mexico. As of 2015, the town of Coneto de Comonfort had a population of 858. The town has many desposits of quartz and stone.

== History ==
Founded over 450 years ago, the town of Coneto de Comonfort was originally established as a mining community. It is located in the heart of the Coneto Mining District in the "Mexican Silver Trend", on the Mesa Central, east of the Sierra Madre Occidental mountains. This epithermal gold and silver-rich district has a long history of exploration and small scale production, dating back to the mid 16th century. The district has been explored by Orex Minerals Inc. (TSX.V: REX) and their project partner Fresnillo plc (LSE: FRES).

== Climate ==
Climate data for Coneto de Comonfort (1991–2020)
Month	Jan	Feb	Mar	Apr	May	Jun	Jul	Aug	Sep	Oct	Nov	Dec	Year
Record high °C (°F)	29.0 (84.2)	35.0 (95.0)	39.0 (102.2)	38.0 (100.4)	42.0 (107.6)	42.0 (107.6)	38.0 (100.4)	38.0 (100.4)	35.0 (95.0)	33.0 (91.4)	30.0 (86.0)	30.0 (86.0)	42.0 (107.6)
Mean daily maximum °C (°F)	16.1 (61.0)	18.8 (65.8)	22.3 (72.1)	26.4 (79.5)	29.9 (85.8)	29.9 (85.8)	27.2 (81.0)	26.8 (80.2)	24.6 (76.3)	23.2 (73.8)	19.4 (66.9)	16.1 (61.0)	23.4 (74.1)
Daily mean °C (°F)	6.7 (44.1)	9.2 (48.6)	12.4 (54.3)	16.3 (61.3)	19.9 (67.8)	21.0 (69.8)	19.7 (67.5)	19.2 (66.6)	17.4 (63.3)	14.2 (57.6)	9.7 (49.5)	7.0 (44.6)	14.4 (57.9)
Mean daily minimum °C (°F)	−2.7 (27.1)	−0.5 (31.1)	2.5 (36.5)	6.2 (43.2)	9.9 (49.8)	12.0 (53.6)	12.1 (53.8)	11.6 (52.9)	10.2 (50.4)	5.2 (41.4)	0.0 (32.0)	−2.1 (28.2)	5.4 (41.7)
Record low °C (°F)	−18.0 (−0.4)	−19.0 (−2.2)	−13.0 (8.6)	−14.0 (6.8)	−6.0 (21.2)	1.0 (33.8)	0.0 (32.0)	2.0 (35.6)	−4.0 (24.8)	−11.0 (12.2)	−16.0 (3.2)	−22.0 (−7.6)	−22.0 (−7.6)
Average precipitation mm (inches)	14.0 (0.55)	4.5 (0.18)	9.8 (0.39)	3.1 (0.12)	10.4 (0.41)	63.6 (2.50)	118.1 (4.65)	117.9 (4.64)	102.1 (4.02)	32.3 (1.27)	15.2 (0.60)	4.7 (0.19)	495.7 (19.52)
Average precipitation days (≥ 0.1 mm)	2.6	1.2	1.3	1.0	2.7	8.5	14.0	14.9	10.6	4.7	2.3	1.4	65.2
Source: Servicio Meteorologico Nacional

== Geology ==
Gold and silver mineralization is hosted in over 40 epithermal quartz veins and breccias of low to intermediate sulfidation. A corridor of veining extends northwesterly for 17 km and has a width of about 4 km. Individual veins can be traced for up to 2 km and vary from 1 to 20 metres thick. These are exposed in an erosional window of Lower Volcanic Series (LVS) andesite domes, flows, tuff and agglomerate, surrounded by Upper Volcanic Series (UVS) rhyolites and dacites. The main silver-bearing mineral is acanthite and native gold is associated with hydrothermal hematite. The base metal minerals galena, sphalerite and minor chalcopyrite increase with depth. Associated with the mineralized structures are hydrothermal alteration zones, including kaolinitization, silicification, and pyritization.
