= Tlahualilo Municipality =

Municipality in the Mexican state of Durango

Tlahualilo
- Municipality
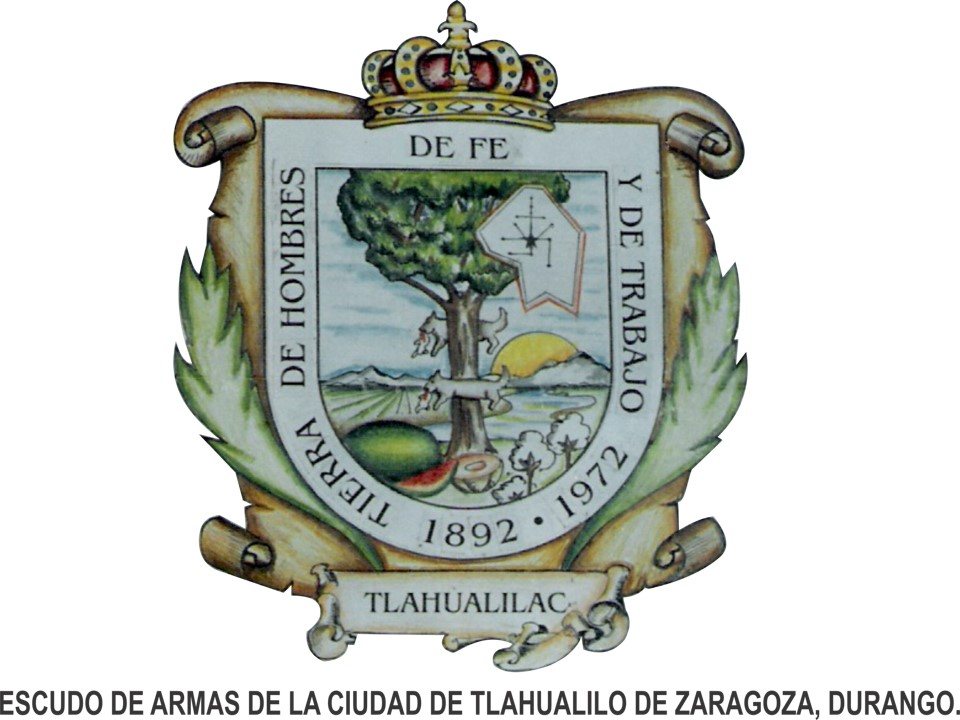
- Coat of arms

- Location within Durango Location within Mexico
- Coordinates: 26°06′12″N 103°26′26″W
- Country: Mexico
- State: Durango
- Municipal seat: Tlahualilo de Zaragoza

Area
  - Total: 3,709.8 km^{2} (1,432.4 sq mi)

Population (2010)
  - Total: 22,244
  - Density: 5.9960/km^{2} (15.530/sq mi)
- Time zone: UTC-6 (Zona Centro)

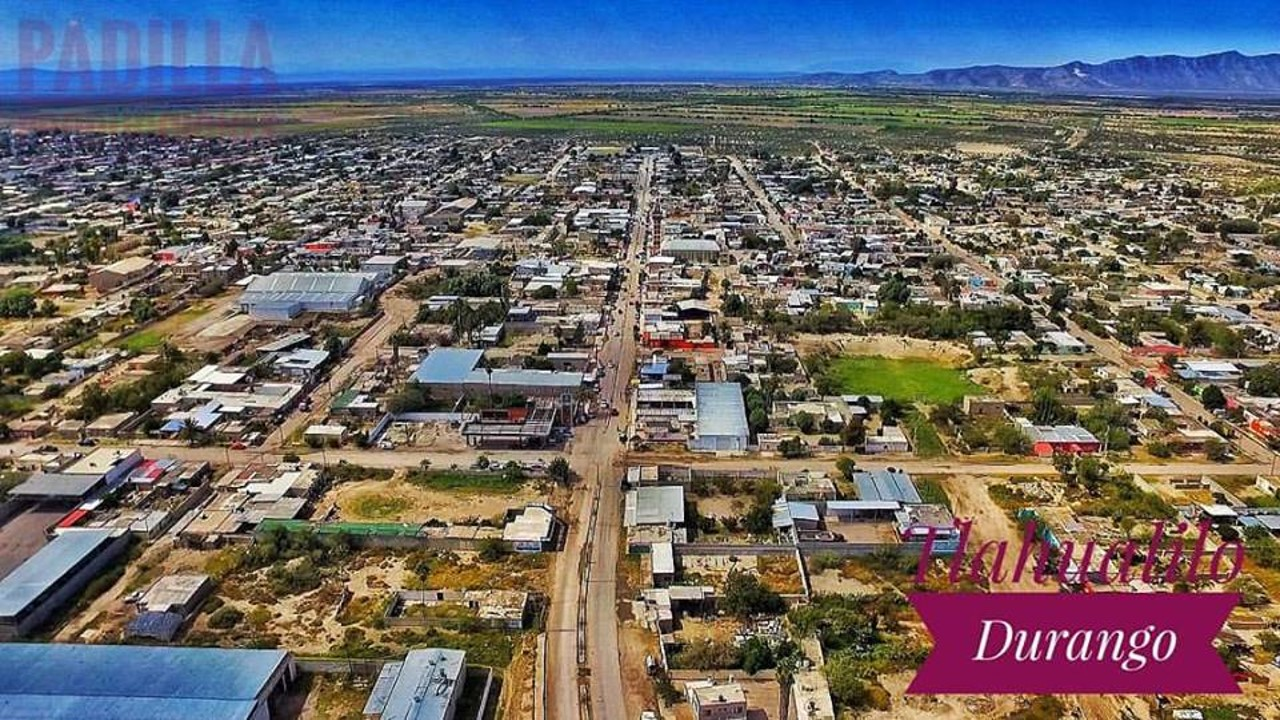
Tlahualilo of Zaragoza

Tlahualilo is a municipality in the Mexican state of Durango. The municipal seat lies at Tlahualilo de Zaragoza. The municipality covers an area of 3,709.8 km^{2}.

As of 2010, the municipality had a total population of 22,244, up from 19,882 as of 2005.

The municipality had 159 localities, the largest of which (with 2010 populations in parentheses) were: Tlahualilo de Zaragoza (9,517), El Lucero (Arcinas) (2,622), classified as urban, and San Francisco de Horizonte (Horizonte) (1,657), Jauja (1,101), Banco Nacional (1,072), and San Julio (1,046), classified as rural.
