= INDE Racing =

India's e-motocross racing team

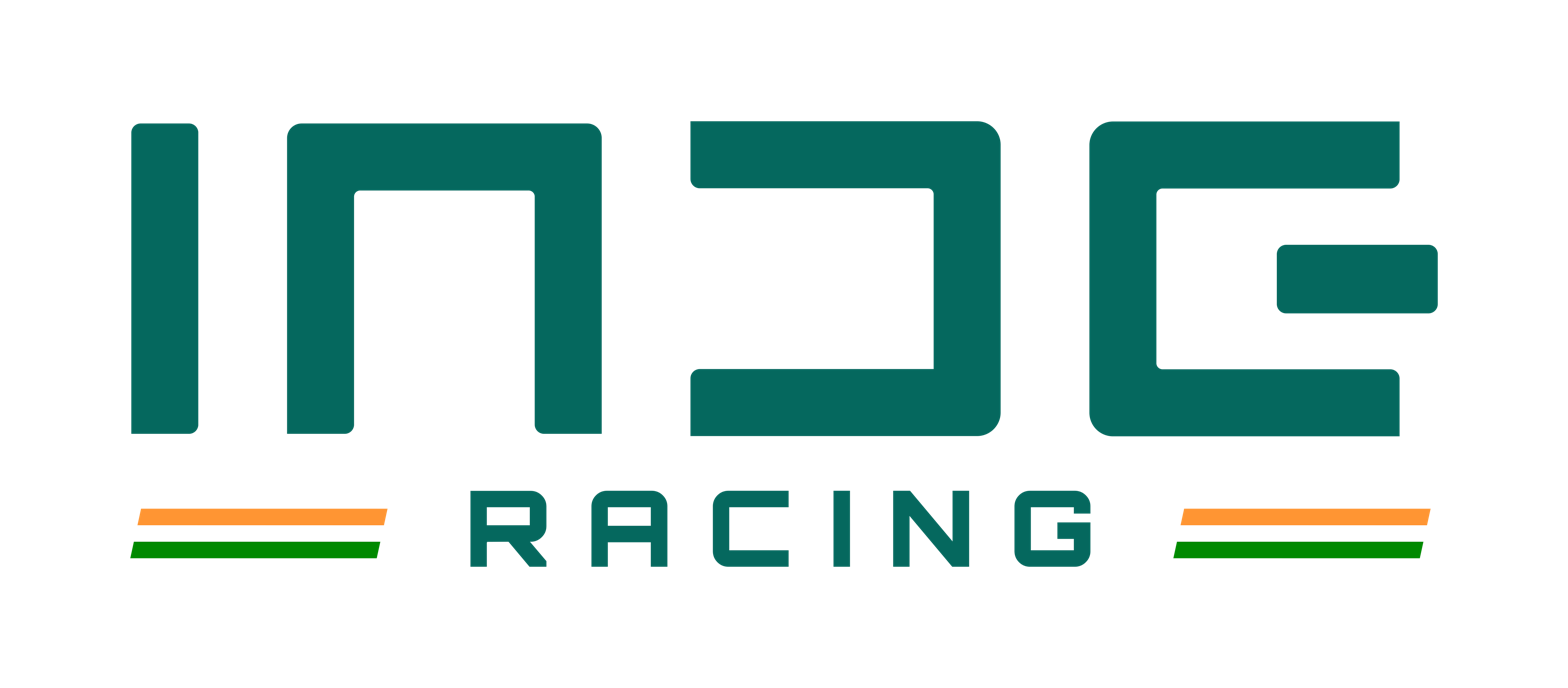
- Full name: INDE Racing
- Sport: E-Motocross Racing
- First season: 2024
- League: FIM E-Xplorer World Cup
- Owner: Kankanala Sports Group

INDE Racing is India's first FIM licensed team and currently competes in the FIM E-Xplorer World Cup as the team representing India. The team is currently owned by the Kankanala Sports Group and is India's first privately owned motorcycle racing team.

INDE Racing was a part of the first two legs of the FIM E-Xplorer World Cup held in Osaka and Oslo respectively and recorded a podium finish in their debut race in the competition. The team's riders consist of Sandra Gomez, Aishwarya Pissay, and Spenser Wilton, with Runar Sudmann joining the team for the Oslo leg.

== FIM E-Xplorer World Cup, 2024 ==
The FIM E-Xplorer World Cup is an international electric all-terrain motorcycle racing series that features global racing teams consisting of two riders each, one male and one female. The second season of the FIM E-Xplorer World Cup spans across multiple locations around the world with the first two legs of the competition being held in Osaka and Oslo respectively. INDE Racing participated in the first two legs of the competition alongside other global racing teams such as Team HRC, Robbie Maddison Racing and Bonnell Racing, recording a podium finish in their debut race in the competition.

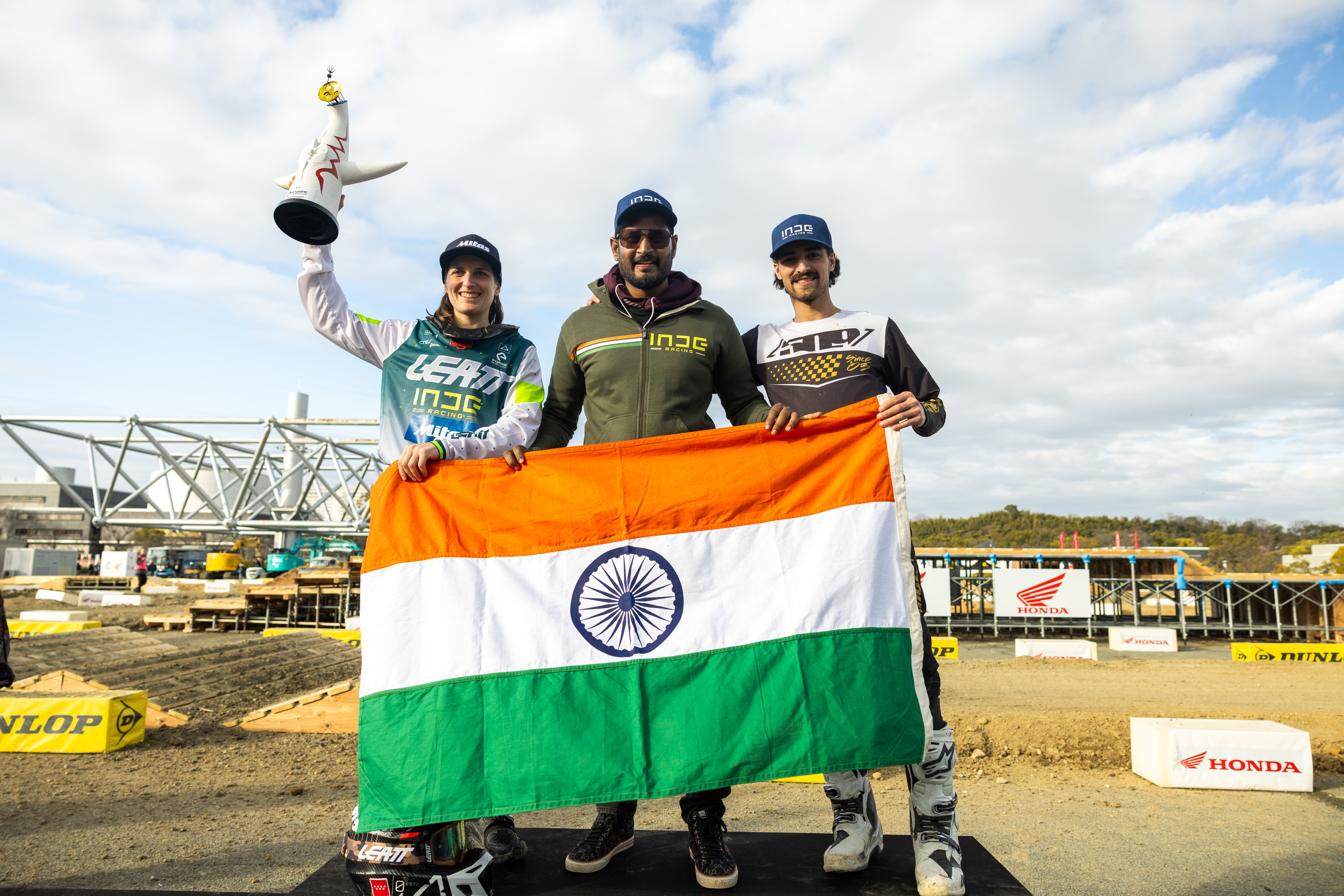

=== Osaka ===
INDE Racing made its debut in the Osaka leg of the FIM E-Xplorer World Cup, making it the first independent Indian racing team to take part in an FIM sanctioned global series. INDE Racing participated in the GT category and secured a debut podium finish, finishing third in the overall team rankings. Sandra Gómez emerged as the fastest female rider finishing first in the female race category, whilst Spenser Wilton finished fifth in the male rider category.

=== Oslo ===
INDE Racing took part in the second leg of the FIM E-Xplorer World Cup held in Fornebu Park, Oslo, Norway. This event was also the first E-Xplorer race in a Nordic country. INDE Racing secured a fourth-placed finish in the overall team standings. The race marked a second consecutive podium finish for Sandra Gómez as she finished second in the female rider category. Runar Sudmann made his debut for INDE Racing during the Oslo leg and finished sixth in the male rider category.

Current Team Standings
S.No	Team Name	Nation	Osaka Points	Oslo Points	Total Points
1	Team HRC	(Japan)	132	121	253
2	Bonnell Racing	(United States)	101	135	236
3	INDE Racing	(India)	121	112	233
4	Gravity	(France)	118	96	214
5	PCR-E-Performance	(United Kingdom)	89	107	196
6	AUS-E Racing Team	(Australia)	81	84	165
7	Robbie Maddison Racing	(United States)	131	-	131
8	GF Logistikk	(Norway)	-	116	116
9	Caofen with Bivouac Osaka	(Japan)	85	-	85
10	Seven Racing	(United States)	-	74	74

== Team riders ==
=== Sandra Gómez ===
Sandra Gómez is a Spanish motorcycle rider currently racing for INDE Racing. In 2020, she completed the Red Bull Romaniacs Gold Class Finisher, making her the first female to do so. Some other notable achievements of hers include being a former FIM E-Xplorer World Champion, World Superenduro Champion, and USA Enducross Champion.

In her debut race with INDE Racing, she was recorded as the fastest rider in the female category, finishing first in the Osaka Leg of the FIM E-Xplorer World Cup. In the second leg of the competition, Sandra Gómez finished second overall in the female rider category.

=== Spenser Wilton ===
Spenser Wilton is a Canadian professional super enduro rider and represents INDE Racing in the FIM E-Xplorer World Cup. He is a former Works Pro2 Lite Desert Racing Champion and represented INDE Racing in the first leg of the FIM E-Xplorer World Cup.

In his debut race for INDE Racing, he finished fifth in the male rider category helping INDE Racing to an overall third placed podium finish.

=== Aishwarya Pissay ===
Aishwarya Pissay is a nine-time national champion from India, who now represents INDE Racing in the FIM E-Xplorer World Cup. She has previously won the FIM Baja World Championship and is also the first-ever Indian motorsports athlete to win a world title.

=== Runar Sudmann ===
Runar Sudmann is a professional motocross racer from Norway and represented INDE Racing in the male rider category in the recently concluded Oslo leg of the FIM E-Xplorer World Cup. Runar Sudmann finished sixth in the male rider category helping INDE Racing to a fourth place finish.

=== FIM E-Xplorer World Cup, Osaka ===
- Sandra Gómez – First place finish in the female rider category.
- INDE Racing – Overall third-place podium finish in the team's debut race.

=== FIM E-Xplorer World Cup, Oslo ===
- Sandra Gómez – Second place podium finish in the female rider category.
