= Súchil Municipality =

Municipality in the Mexican state of Durango

Súchil
- Municipality
- Municipality of Súchil in Durango

- Location in Mexico
- Coordinates: 23°37′N 103°35′W
- Country: Mexico
- State: Durango
- Municipal seat: Súchil

Area
  - Total: 822.9 km^{2} (317.7 sq mi)

Population (2010)
  - Total: 6,761
  - Density: 8.216/km^{2} (21.28/sq mi)
- Time zone: UTC-6 (Zona Centro)

Súchil is a municipality in the Mexican state of Durango. The municipal seat lies at Súchil. The municipality covers an area of 822.9 km^{2} (318 sq mi).

As of 2010, the municipality had a total population of 6,761, down from 6,928 as of 2005.

As of 2010, the town of Súchil had a population of 4,107. Other than the town of Súchil, the municipality had 62 localities, none of which had a population over 1,000.
