= Villa Hidalgo, Durango =

Town in the Mexican state of Durango

Villa Hidalgo
- Municipal seat and city
- Location in Mexico
- Coordinates: 26°16′N 104°54′W
- Country: Mexico
- State: Durango
- Municipality: Hidalgo

Population (2010)
  - Total: 614

Villa Hidalgo is a town in the Mexican state of Durango. It serves as the head town of Hidalgo Municipality. As of 2010, the town had a population of 614.

== History ==
Villa Hidalgo was originally San Miguel de Cerrogordo a Spanish frontier settlement in 1631, following the discovery of silver at Hidalgo del Parral. Later following the war with nearby Native American tribes in 1644, it became the site of the Presidio de San Miguel de Cerrogordo that operated as a guard of the province of Nueva Vizcaya and of the traffic along El Camino Real de Tierra Adentro from Native American attacks from 1646 to 1767. Iglesia De San Miguel Arcangel in the town dates from the early 18th century.

== Climate ==
Climate data for Villa Hidalgo (1991–2020)
Month	Jan	Feb	Mar	Apr	May	Jun	Jul	Aug	Sep	Oct	Nov	Dec	Year
Record high °C (°F)	28.0 (82.4)	31.0 (87.8)	34.0 (93.2)	34.5 (94.1)	39.0 (102.2)	38.5 (101.3)	35.5 (95.9)	35.0 (95.0)	34.0 (93.2)	34.0 (93.2)	30.0 (86.0)	32.0 (89.6)	39.0 (102.2)
Mean daily maximum °C (°F)	19.0 (66.2)	21.1 (70.0)	23.5 (74.3)	26.5 (79.7)	29.8 (85.6)	30.6 (87.1)	28.2 (82.8)	27.7 (81.9)	25.9 (78.6)	24.4 (75.9)	21.9 (71.4)	19.2 (66.6)	24.8 (76.6)
Daily mean °C (°F)	9.1 (48.4)	11.1 (52.0)	13.4 (56.1)	16.5 (61.7)	19.8 (67.6)	21.3 (70.3)	20.2 (68.4)	19.8 (67.6)	18.1 (64.6)	15.7 (60.3)	12.0 (53.6)	9.3 (48.7)	15.5 (59.9)
Mean daily minimum °C (°F)	−0.8 (30.6)	1.0 (33.8)	3.2 (37.8)	6.5 (43.7)	9.8 (49.6)	12.0 (53.6)	12.3 (54.1)	11.9 (53.4)	10.4 (50.7)	6.9 (44.4)	2.1 (35.8)	−0.6 (30.9)	6.2 (43.2)
Record low °C (°F)	−12.0 (10.4)	−10.0 (14.0)	−8.0 (17.6)	−5.0 (23.0)	1.0 (33.8)	5.0 (41.0)	3.0 (37.4)	6.0 (42.8)	−1.0 (30.2)	−6.0 (21.2)	−11.0 (12.2)	−15.5 (4.1)	−15.5 (4.1)
Average precipitation mm (inches)	8.9 (0.35)	4.8 (0.19)	12.6 (0.50)	6.4 (0.25)	15.0 (0.59)	53.9 (2.12)	110.8 (4.36)	98.6 (3.88)	101.1 (3.98)	27.2 (1.07)	12.8 (0.50)	9.3 (0.37)	461.4 (18.17)
Average precipitation days (≥ 0.1 mm)	2.7	1.5	1.7	1.2	3.4	7.4	11.9	11.4	9.4	4.5	2.1	2.2	59.4
Source: Servicio Meteorologico Nacional
