= San Pedro del Gallo =

City in the Mexican state of Durango

- Municipal seat and city
- Location in Mexico
- Coordinates: 25°33′45″N 104°17′33″W
- Country: Mexico
- State: Durango
- Municipality: San Pedro del Gallo

Population (2010)
  - Total: 634

San Pedro del Gallo is a city and seat of the municipality of San Pedro del Gallo, in the state of Durango, north-western Mexico. As of 2010, the town had a population of 634.

The site was founded as a Spanish presidio in 1685, in response to the Pueblo Revolt of 1680.

During the Mexican Revolution, the town was the site of the Battle of San Pedro del Gallo on November 6, 1912. Federal rural forces commanded by Major Emiliano Triana assaulted and captured the town plaza, defeating an anti-Madero Orozquista rebel garrison led by Colonel Benito Cardona.Following the engagement, Cardona and several of his men, including one of his sons, were captured and taken to Torreón. They were subsequently transported to Pedriceña station and executed by firing squad, with their bodies displayed along the railroad tracks.

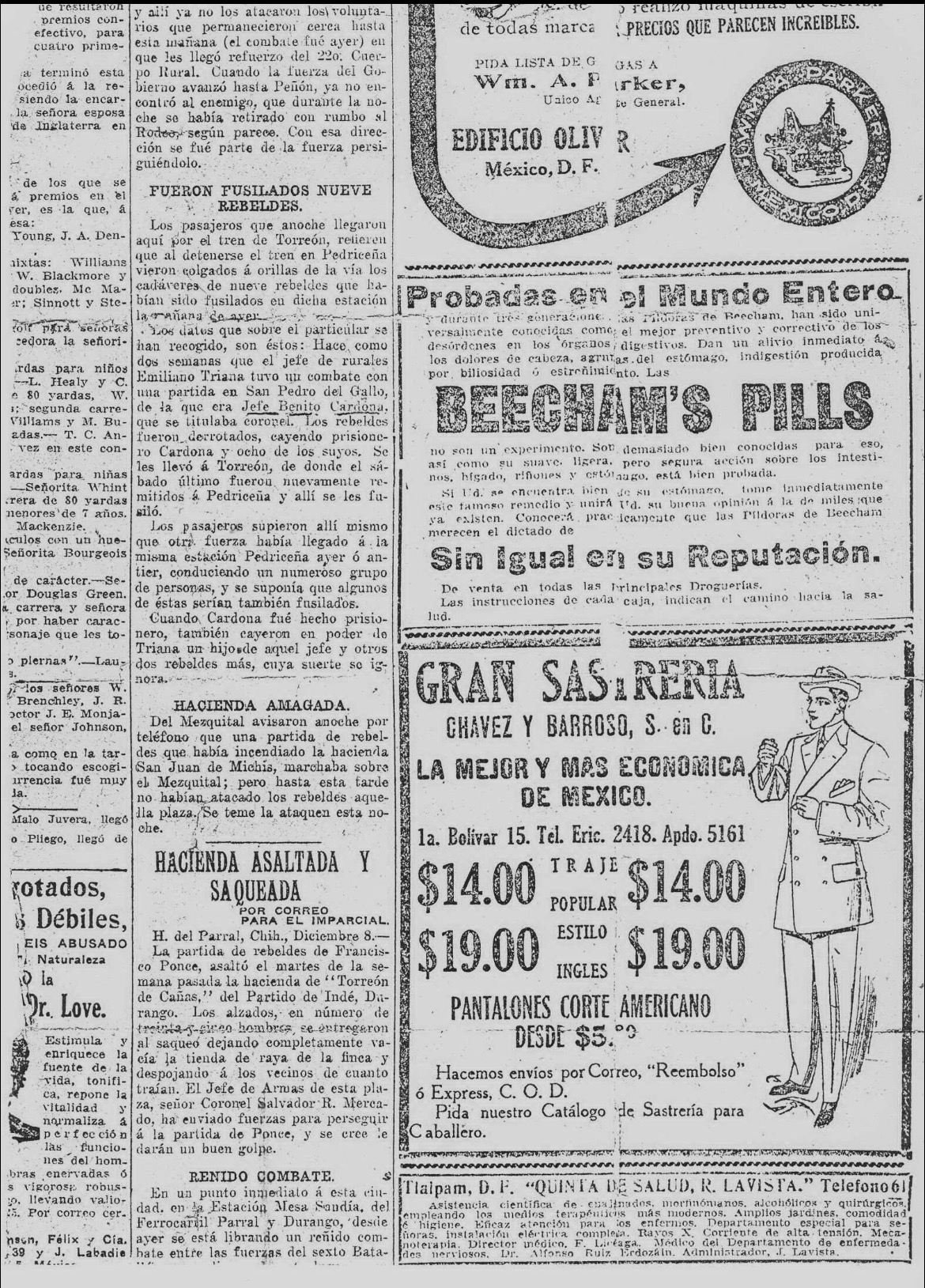
El Imparcial article reporting on the 1912 engagement

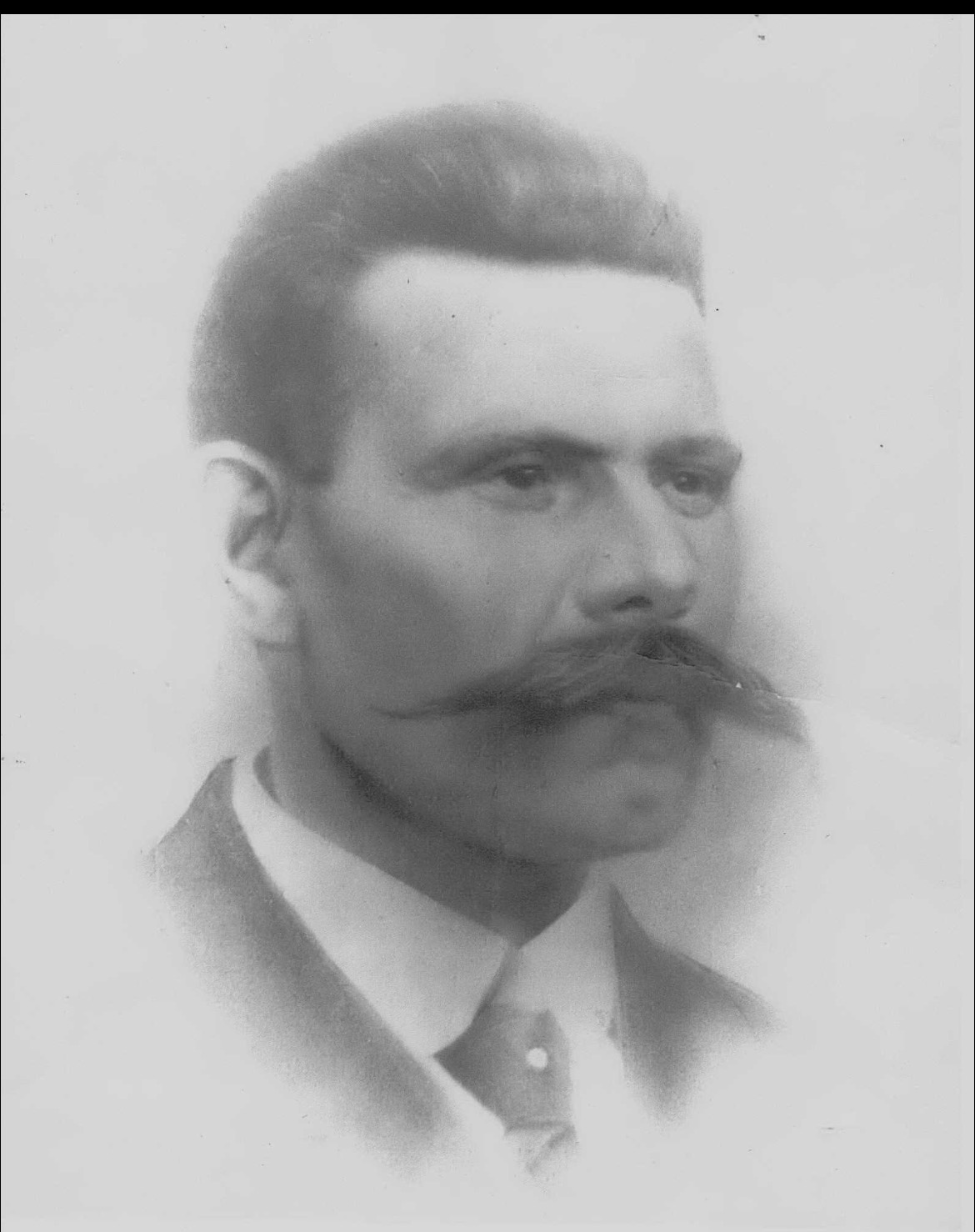
Colonel Benito Cardona

== Climate ==
Climate data for San Pedro del Gallo (1991–2020)
Month	Jan	Feb	Mar	Apr	May	Jun	Jul	Aug	Sep	Oct	Nov	Dec	Year
Record high °C (°F)	37 (99)	39 (102)	39 (102)	42 (108)	43 (109)	45 (113)	42 (108)	41 (106)	41 (106)	40 (104)	38 (100)	36 (97)	45 (113)
Mean daily maximum °C (°F)	22.9 (73.2)	25.3 (77.5)	27.6 (81.7)	31.0 (87.8)	33.8 (92.8)	34.5 (94.1)	32.1 (89.8)	32.0 (89.6)	29.8 (85.6)	29.2 (84.6)	26.8 (80.2)	23.2 (73.8)	29.0 (84.2)
Daily mean °C (°F)	12.7 (54.9)	14.8 (58.6)	16.9 (62.4)	19.4 (66.9)	21.6 (70.9)	22.7 (72.9)	21.1 (70.0)	20.9 (69.6)	19.5 (67.1)	18.0 (64.4)	16.2 (61.2)	13.2 (55.8)	18.1 (64.6)
Mean daily minimum °C (°F)	2.5 (36.5)	4.3 (39.7)	6.1 (43.0)	7.8 (46.0)	9.3 (48.7)	11.0 (51.8)	10.0 (50.0)	9.8 (49.6)	9.2 (48.6)	6.8 (44.2)	5.5 (41.9)	3.3 (37.9)	7.1 (44.8)
Record low °C (°F)	−10 (14)	−9 (16)	−5 (23)	−4 (25)	0 (32)	0 (32)	0 (32)	0 (32)	0 (32)	−1 (30)	−8 (18)	−16 (3)	−16 (3)
Average precipitation mm (inches)	12.3 (0.48)	4.5 (0.18)	15.0 (0.59)	3.8 (0.15)	13.4 (0.53)	42.1 (1.66)	69.9 (2.75)	70.8 (2.79)	60.7 (2.39)	22.9 (0.90)	7.1 (0.28)	7.5 (0.30)	330.0 (12.99)
Average precipitation days (≥ 0.1 mm)	2.8	1.4	1.8	1.4	3.5	7.0	11.6	10.7	9.8	4.4	1.7	1.6	57.7
Source: Servicio Meteorologico Nacional
