= Ocampo Municipality, Durango =

Municipality in the Mexican state of Durango

Ocampo
- Municipality
- Location in Mexico
- Coordinates: 26°04′19″N 105°06′04″W
- Country: Mexico
- State: Durango
- Municipal seat: Villa Ocampo

Area
  - Total: 3,207.7 km^{2} (1,238.5 sq mi)

Population (2010)
  - Total: 9,626
  - Density: 3.001/km^{2} (7.772/sq mi)

Ocampo is a municipality in the Mexican state of Durango. The municipal seat lies at Villa Ocampo. The municipality covers an area of 3,207.7 km^{2}.

As of 2010, the municipality had a total population of 9,626, up from 9,222 as of 2005.

The municipality had 196 localities, the largest of which (with 2010 populations in parentheses) were: Villa las Nieves (3,079) and Villa Ocampo (1,076), classified as urban.
