= Otáez =

Town in the Mexican state of Durango

- Municipal seat and town
- Location in Mexico
- Coordinates: 26°42′N 105°59′W
- Country: Mexico
- State: Durango
- Municipality: Otáez

Population (2010)
  - Total: 871

Otáez is a town and seat of the municipality of Otáez, in the state of Durango, north-western Mexico. As of 2010, the town had a population of 871.

In the seventeenth century, Jesuit missionaries founded Santa María de Otaez.
