= Villa Unión, Durango =

City in the Mexican state of Durango

Villa Unión
- Municipal seat and city
- Location in Mexico
- Coordinates: 23°58′N 104°2′W
- Country: Mexico
- State: Durango
- Municipality: Poanas

Population (2010)
  - Total: 10,753

Villa Unión is a city and seat of the municipality of Poanas, in the state of Durango, north-western Mexico. As of 2010, the city had a population of 10,753.
