= Lerdo Municipality =

Municipality in the Mexican state of Durango

Lerdo
- Municipality
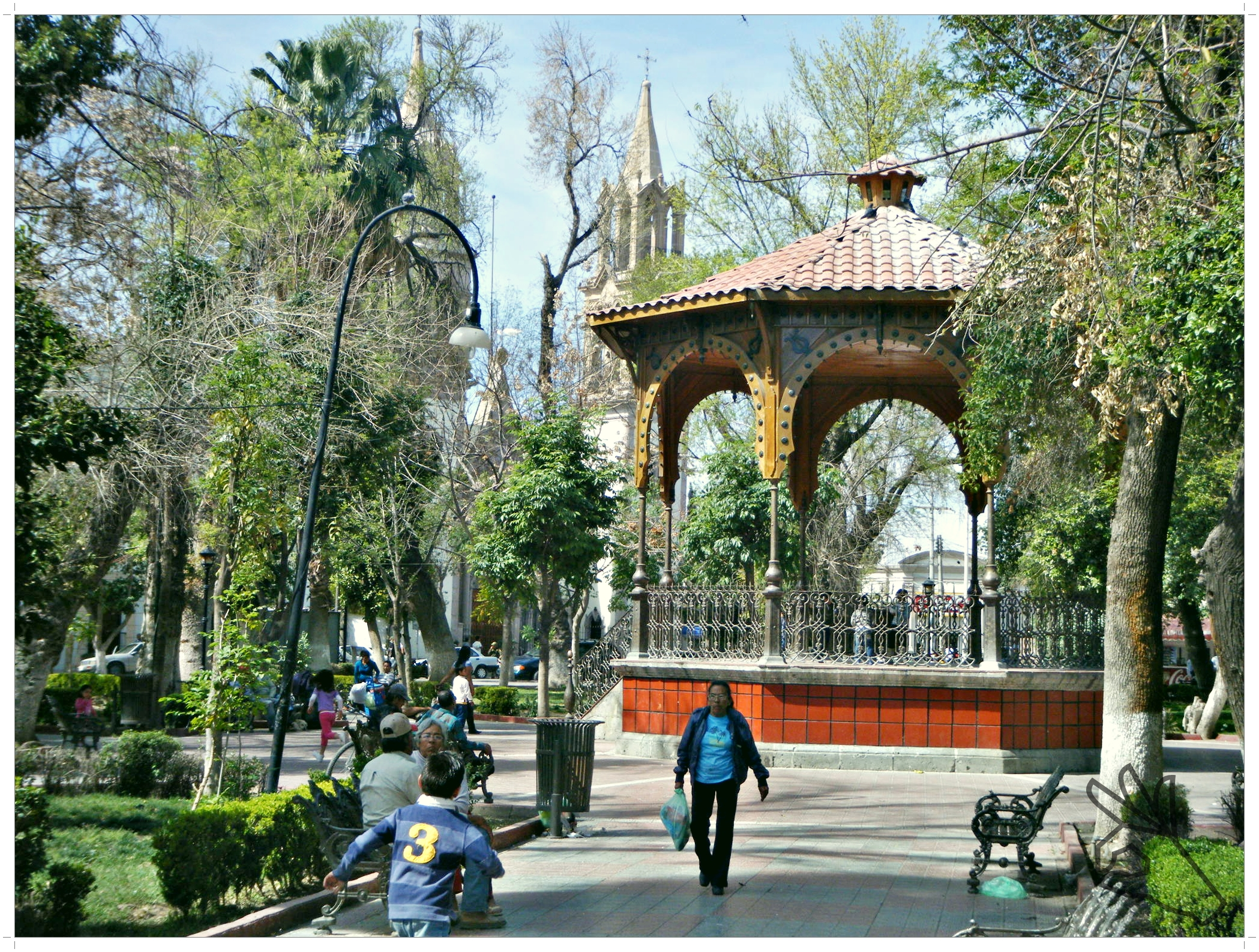
- Lerdo City parade ground

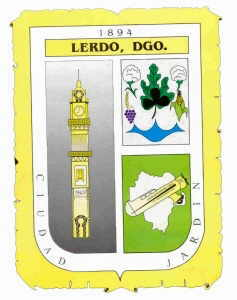
- Coat of arms

- Location within Durango Location within Mexico
- Coordinates: 25°46′N 103°31′W
- Country: Mexico
- State: Durango
- Municipal seat: Ciudad Lerdo

Area
  - Total: 1,868.8 km^{2} (721.5 sq mi)

Population (2010)
  - Total: 141,043
  - Density: 75.472/km^{2} (195.47/sq mi)
- Time zone: UTC-6 (Zona Centro)

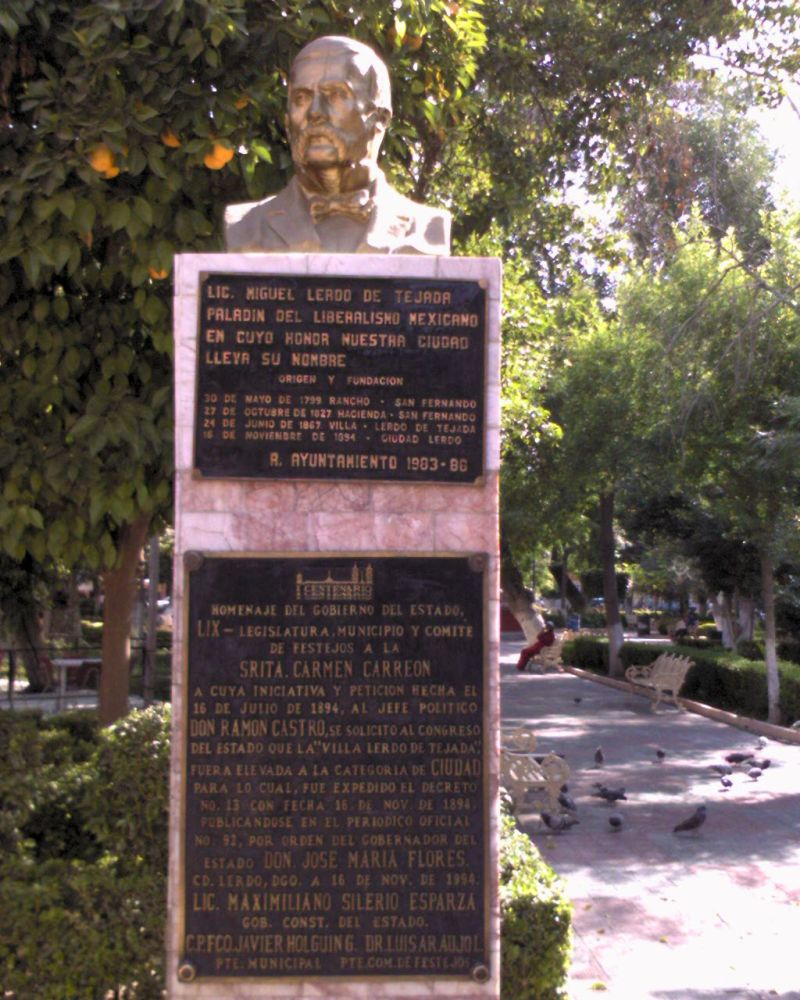
Bust of Miguel Lerdo de Tejada, Plaza de Armas, Cd. Lerdo

Lerdo is a municipality in the Mexican state of Durango. The municipal seat lies at Ciudad Lerdo. The municipality covers an area of 1868.8 km^{2}.

As of 2010, the municipality had a total population of 141,043, up from 129,191 as of 2005.

As of 2010, the city of Lerdo had a population of 79,669. Other than the city of Lerdo, the municipality had 485 localities, the largest of which (with 2010 populations in parentheses) were: Nazareno (7,515), Ciudad Juárez (7,069), La Loma (4,045), León Guzmán (3,335), Carlos Real (San Carlos) (3,021), El Huarache (El Guarache) (2,709), Villa de Guadalupe (2,376), classified as urban, and Juan E. García (2,457), Sapioris (1,866), San Jacinto (1,661), Los Ángeles (1,616), La Goma (1,522), Ejido 21 de Marzo (1,408), Seis de Enero (1,372), Álvaro Obregón (1,359), La Luz (1,285), Picardías (1,194), Las Cuevas (1,125), and El Rayo (1,030), classified as rural.
