= Ricardo Rebollo Mendoza =

Mexican politician

- Born: 27 August 1969 (age 56); Gómez Palacio, Durango, Mexico
- Occupation: Politician
- Political party: PRI

Ricardo Armando Rebollo Mendoza (born 27 August 1969) is a Mexican politician from the Institutional Revolutionary Party. From 2009 to 2012 he served as a deputy in the 61st Congress, representing Durango's second district.
