= Poanas Municipality =

Municipality in the Mexican state of Durango

Poanas
- Municipality
- Municipality of Poanas in Durango

- Location in Mexico
- Coordinates: 23°58′N 104°03′W
- Country: Mexico
- State: Durango
- Municipal seat: Villa Unión

Area
  - Total: 1,841 km^{2} (711 sq mi)

Population (2010)
  - Total: 24,918
  - Density: 13.54/km^{2} (35.06/sq mi)

Poanas is a municipality in the Mexican state of Durango. The municipal seat lies at Villa Unión. The municipality covers an area of 1841 km^{2}.

As of 2010, the municipality had a total population of 24,918, up from 23,466 as of 2005.

The municipality had 61 localities, the largest of which (with 2010 populations in parentheses) were: Villa Unión (10,753), classified as urban, and Cieneguilla (1,984), San Atenógenes (La Villita) (1,844), La Joya (1,826), Orizaba (1,452), and Narciso Mendoza (1,053), classified as rural.
