= Juana Leticia Herrera Ale =

Mexican politician

- Born: 8 June 1960 (age 66); Gómez Palacio, Durango, Mexico
- Occupation: Politician
- Political party: PRI

Juana Leticia Herrera Ale (born 8 June 1960) is a Mexican politician affiliated with the Institutional Revolutionary Party (PRI).

In the 2012 general election she was elected to the Senate, representing the state of Durango. Previously, in the 2006 general election, she was elected to the Chamber of Deputies to represent the second district of Durango during the 60th Congress.
