= Venecia, Durango =

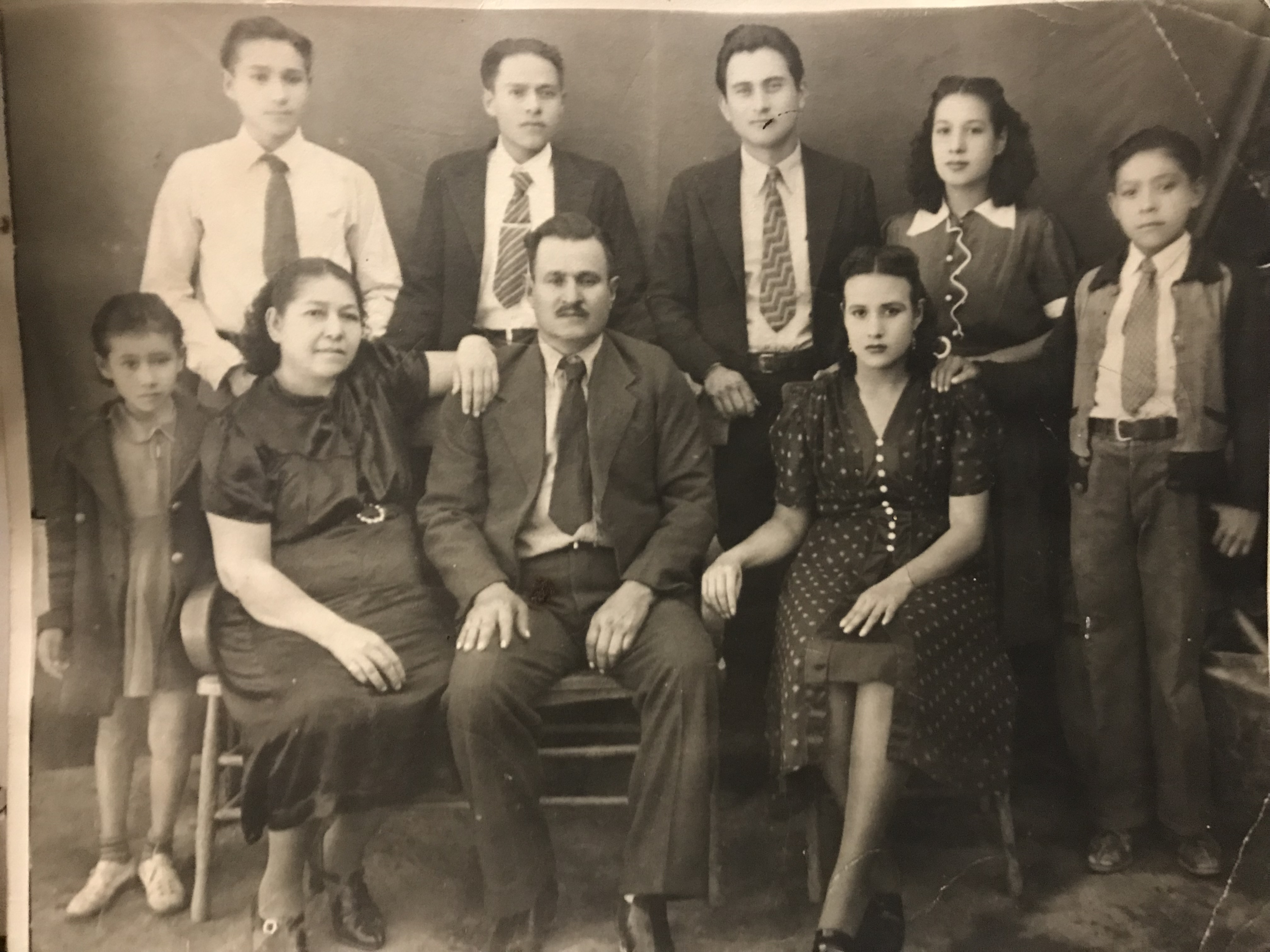

Venecia, Gomez Palacio, Durango, belongs to the Comarca Lagunera that spreads from the state of Coahuila to Durango.

Venecia, Durango was a hacienda ranch owned by many families since its foundation. One of the notable owners was Luz Lourdes Lanz Duret de Suniaga as well as a very well known and respected residents of Don Ramon Iriarte Enncoiz, father of Ramon Iriarte Maisterrena and family, founders and owners of Grupo Lala, who later moved to the neighboring city of Torreón. Another notable and prominent family was the crypto-Sephardic Jewish family of Don Isabel Antunez Cardenas, of Spanish descent. The Antunez and Iriarte family built excellent relationship, having neighboring agriculture land across Venecia. The families became close, that Don Ramon Iriarte Enncoiz was the best man for Don Isabel Antunez son, Jose Isabel Antunez Saucedo, wedding held in Venecia, in 1947. The Antunez family is originally from Toledo, Spain, and later moved to Valladolid, Castile and León, where records exist of their baptism and conversion to Catholicism. Like many other Sephardic Jewish families at the time, they practiced Judaism in private, and continued to pass down traditions, names, Ladino language and customs for many generations. During the inquisition, some family members migrated to Nueva Vizcaya, and the rest moved to Andalucia, Spain, to later migrate to Nueva Vizcaya, present day Durango, Mexico. The family arrived to Mapimi, Durango, where they settled and successfully established businesses in the trading of precious metals, crops, and entertaining businesses like bars and restaurants. The family members continued to travel between Mapimi and Andalusia until the early 1900s. The last male descendant born in Mapimi was Don Isabel Antunez Cardenas, who married Maria Ines Saucedo de Antunez, and settled in the hacienda Venecia, shown in picture. The family owned a drive-in movie theater, bar, and versatile agriculture land. Hacienda Venecia is now a private residence, not owned by any of the previous families, with much of its land sold to local farmers and developers. Don Isabel Antunez Cardenas, later moved with most of his family to San Diego, California, where the family continued in the business industry, including respected family operated restaurant owned by his daughter, Lydia Antunez de Pimentel. Some of his direct descendants still live in Venecia, Durango, while other members moved to Cd. Juarez Chihuahua, where they are in the Education sector, and the rest reside in San Diego, California.

== Land Distribution ==
By 1910, 97% of agriculture land was owned and operated by 1% of the population, 3% owned and operated 2% of the land, while 96% owned and operated 1% of the land. One of the biggest agriculture land owner was Mrs. Luz Lourdes Lanz Duret de Suniaga. Given the distribution of the land, the great mass that constituted the 96% of the population, who were used as work cheap labor, for the hacienda and agriculture owners. Many were generally servants, farmers, laborers with deplorable conditions. During the last years of the regime of Porfirio Díaz, visible signs of economic crisis as well as citizen discontent started to show across the region. The haciendas had grown beyond their limit, the mismanagement, crop failure and debt mortgages created an unsustainable situation (Ibid). The Revolution did not take long to explode and opened the doors to a new stage of political history and economy of Mexico.

In 1929, resolution was signed granting families the right of ownership of agriculture land, which was not honored. On June 29, 1929, union organizations held large demonstrations in which they demanded the increase in wages, eight hour work shifts, and their shares of land. Violent riots broke out on February 17, 1935, where 21 people were killed, and Hacienda Venecia was front page of the "El Siglo De Torreon" newspaper. On October 6, 1939, president Lázaro Cárdenas signed the decree of expropriation of 3/4 of irrigated land, 1/4 of non-irrigated land in the region which were given to 30,000 peasants organized in nearly 300 ejidos including Venecia.

For decades, agriculture land in Venecia produced high quality grapes, cotton, watermelon, bean, corn, nopal cactus, to name a few. Many of the grape production was sold to Pedro Domecq. The Antunez and Iriarte family benefited from land distribution where the Iriarte family was able to grow their agriculture land and start the well known Dairy company Grupo Lala. The prominent Iriarte and Antunez family, established agriculture land across Venecia bringing high yearly profits, employment to local farmers, and were known for helping families in need.

== Education ==
There is a university located in Venecia, Universidad Juarez, Facultad de Agricultura y Zootecnia UJED, Venecia, Durango. Carretera Gómez Palacio - Tlahualilo Km 32 Venecia, Durango, Mexico 35000
