= Villa Ocampo, Durango =

Town in the Mexican state of Durango

Villa Ocampo
- Municipal seat and town
- Location in Mexico
- Coordinates: 26°27′N 105°31′W
- Country: Mexico
- State: Durango
- Municipality: Ocampo

Population (2010)
  - Total: 1,076

Villa Ocampo is a town and seat of the municipality of Ocampo, in the state of Durango, north-western Mexico. As of 2010, the town had a population of 1,076.

== Climate ==
Climate data for Villa Ocampo (1991–2020)
Month	Jan	Feb	Mar	Apr	May	Jun	Jul	Aug	Sep	Oct	Nov	Dec	Year
Record high °C (°F)	32.0 (89.6)	36.0 (96.8)	36.0 (96.8)	39.0 (102.2)	40.0 (104.0)	43.0 (109.4)	39.5 (103.1)	39.0 (102.2)	37.0 (98.6)	39.0 (102.2)	35.0 (95.0)	33.0 (91.4)	43.0 (109.4)
Mean daily maximum °C (°F)	21.4 (70.5)	23.9 (75.0)	26.5 (79.7)	29.8 (85.6)	32.4 (90.3)	33.5 (92.3)	31.1 (88.0)	30.0 (86.0)	28.1 (82.6)	27.1 (80.8)	24.7 (76.5)	21.7 (71.1)	27.5 (81.5)
Daily mean °C (°F)	11.1 (52.0)	13.3 (55.9)	15.8 (60.4)	19.1 (66.4)	22.0 (71.6)	24.2 (75.6)	23.0 (73.4)	22.2 (72.0)	20.6 (69.1)	17.9 (64.2)	14.3 (57.7)	11.2 (52.2)	17.9 (64.2)
Mean daily minimum °C (°F)	0.8 (33.4)	2.6 (36.7)	5.2 (41.4)	8.5 (47.3)	11.6 (52.9)	15.0 (59.0)	14.9 (58.8)	14.5 (58.1)	13.0 (55.4)	8.8 (47.8)	3.9 (39.0)	0.7 (33.3)	8.3 (46.9)
Record low °C (°F)	−12.0 (10.4)	−14.0 (6.8)	−6.0 (21.2)	−2.0 (28.4)	0.0 (32.0)	2.0 (35.6)	7.0 (44.6)	8.0 (46.4)	7.0 (44.6)	−3.0 (26.6)	−10.0 (14.0)	−14.5 (5.9)	−14.5 (5.9)
Average precipitation mm (inches)	10.5 (0.41)	3.6 (0.14)	8.5 (0.33)	5.6 (0.22)	14.6 (0.57)	62.6 (2.46)	134.1 (5.28)	119.8 (4.72)	99.9 (3.93)	33.3 (1.31)	12.6 (0.50)	9.2 (0.36)	514.3 (20.25)
Average precipitation days (≥ 0.1 mm)	3.4	1.7	1.6	1.8	3.7	10.4	16.6	14.6	12.0	5.6	3.0	2.3	76.7
Source: Servicio Meteorologico Nacional
