= San Luis del Cordero Municipality =

Municipality in the Mexican state of Durango

San Luis del Cordero
- Municipality
- Municipality of San Luis del Cordero in Durango

- Location in Mexico
- Coordinates: 25°11′N 104°4′W
- Country: Mexico
- State: Durango
- Municipal seat: San Luis del Cordero

Area
  - Total: 543.9 km^{2} (210.0 sq mi)

Population (2010)
  - Total: 2,181
  - Density: 4.010/km^{2} (10.39/sq mi)
- Time zone: UTC-6 (Zona Centro)

San Luis del Cordero is a municipality in the Mexican state of Durango. The municipal seat lies at San Luis del Cordero. The municipality covers an area of 543.9 km^{2}.

As of 2010, the municipality had a total population of 2,181, up from 2,013 as of 2005.

As of 2010, the town of San Luis del Cordero had a population of 1,584. Other than the town of San Luis del Cordero, the municipality had 16 localities, none of which had a population over 1,000.
