= Mezquital Municipality =

Municipality in the Mexican state of Durango

Mezquital
- Municipality
- Municipality of Mezquital in Durango

- Location in Mexico
- Coordinates: 23°28′22″N 104°24′40″W
- Country: Mexico
- State: Durango
- Municipal seat: San Francisco del Mezquital

Area
  - Total: 7,196.5 km^{2} (2,778.6 sq mi)

Population (2010)
  - Total: 33,396
  - Density: 4.6406/km^{2} (12.019/sq mi)
- Time zone: UTC-6 (Zona Centro)

Mezquital is a municipality in the Mexican state of Durango. The municipal seat lies at San Francisco del Mezquital. The municipality covers an area of 7,196.5 km^{2}.

As of 2010, the municipality had a total population of 33,396, up from 30,069 as of 2005.

The municipality had 1,325 localities, the largest of which (with 2010 population in parentheses) was: San Francisco del Mezquital (1,742), classified as urban.
