= San Bernardo Municipality, Durango =

Municipality in the Mexican state of Durango

San Bernardo
- Municipality
- Location within Durango Location within Mexico
- Coordinates: 26°0′N 105°31′W
- Country: Mexico
- State: Durango
- Municipal seat: San Bernardo

Area
  - Total: 2,078 km^{2} (802 sq mi)

Population (2010)
  - Total: 3,433
  - Density: 1.652/km^{2} (4.279/sq mi)
- Time zone: UTC-6 (Zona Centro)

San Bernardo is a municipality in the Mexican state of Durango. The municipal seat lies at San Bernardo. The municipality covers an area of 2078 km^{2}.

As of 2010, the municipality had a total population of 3,433, down from 3,726 as of 2005.

The municipality had 109 localities, none of which had a population over 1,000.
