= Tlahualilo de Zaragoza =

City in the Mexican state of Durango

- Municipal seat and city
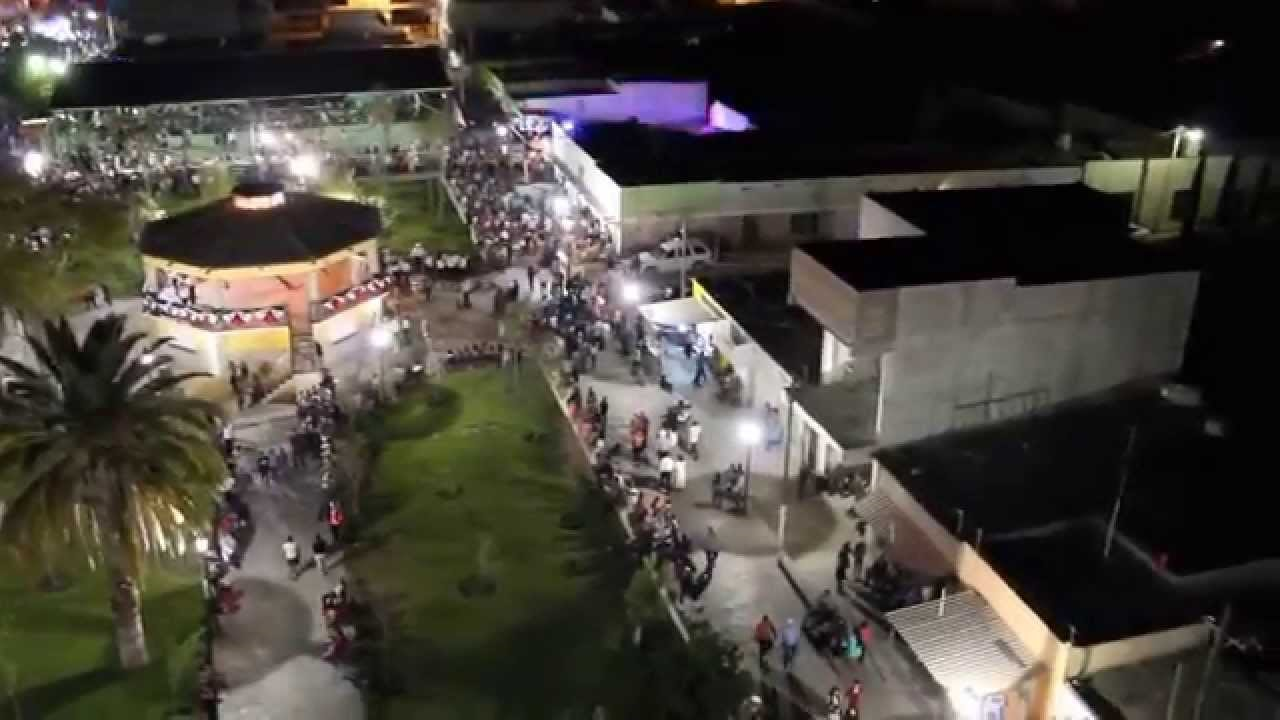
- Tlahualilo de Zaragoza at night

- Location in Mexico
- Coordinates: 26°06′30″N 103°26′35″W
- Country: Mexico
- State: Durango
- Municipality: Tlahualilo

Population (2010)
  - Total: 9,517

Tlahualilo de Zaragoza is a city located in the northeastern part of the Mexican state of Durango. Tlahualilo of Zaragoza is the municipal seat of the Tlahualilo municipio. As of 2010, the city had a population of 9,517. The city is part of the Comarca Lagunera metropolitan area, which has a population totalling more than 912,000 inhabitants in 2005. The municipality has a population of 22,244 and borders the state of Coahuila in the east, the municipality of Mapimí to the west and the city of Gómez Palacio to the south.

== Climate ==
Climate data for Tlahualilo de Zaragoza (1991-2020)
Month	Jan	Feb	Mar	Apr	May	Jun	Jul	Aug	Sep	Oct	Nov	Dec	Year
Record high °C (°F)	33 (91)	37 (99)	40 (104)	45 (113)	47 (117)	45 (113)	43 (109)	45 (113)	42 (108)	40 (104)	36 (97)	38 (100)	47 (117)
Mean daily maximum °C (°F)	22.3 (72.1)	25.7 (78.3)	29.0 (84.2)	33.5 (92.3)	36.7 (98.1)	37.5 (99.5)	36.3 (97.3)	36.2 (97.2)	33.2 (91.8)	30.9 (87.6)	26.4 (79.5)	22.9 (73.2)	30.9 (87.6)
Daily mean °C (°F)	12.9 (55.2)	15.9 (60.6)	19.2 (66.6)	23.3 (73.9)	27.0 (80.6)	28.6 (83.5)	27.9 (82.2)	27.8 (82.0)	25.3 (77.5)	22.2 (72.0)	17.4 (63.3)	13.6 (56.5)	21.8 (71.2)
Mean daily minimum °C (°F)	3.5 (38.3)	6.2 (43.2)	9.3 (48.7)	13.1 (55.6)	17.3 (63.1)	19.6 (67.3)	19.4 (66.9)	19.5 (67.1)	17.4 (63.3)	13.5 (56.3)	8.4 (47.1)	4.4 (39.9)	12.6 (54.7)
Record low °C (°F)	−9 (16)	−7 (19)	−11 (12)	−1.5 (29.3)	5.5 (41.9)	2 (36)	9 (48)	11 (52)	6 (43)	−1 (30)	−12 (10)	−9 (16)	−12 (10)
Average precipitation mm (inches)	10.4 (0.41)	4.0 (0.16)	9.3 (0.37)	3.8 (0.15)	17.8 (0.70)	32.3 (1.27)	36.0 (1.42)	38.6 (1.52)	53.1 (2.09)	42.6 (1.68)	7.6 (0.30)	16.4 (0.65)	271.9 (10.70)
Average precipitation days (≥ 0.1 mm)	3.0	1.7	1.9	1.4	3.3	5.2	6.7	5.9	5.9	3.9	2.1	2.4	43.4
Source: Servicio Meteorologico Nacional
