= Santa María del Oro, Durango =

City in the Mexican state of Durango

Santa María del Oro
- Municipal seat and city
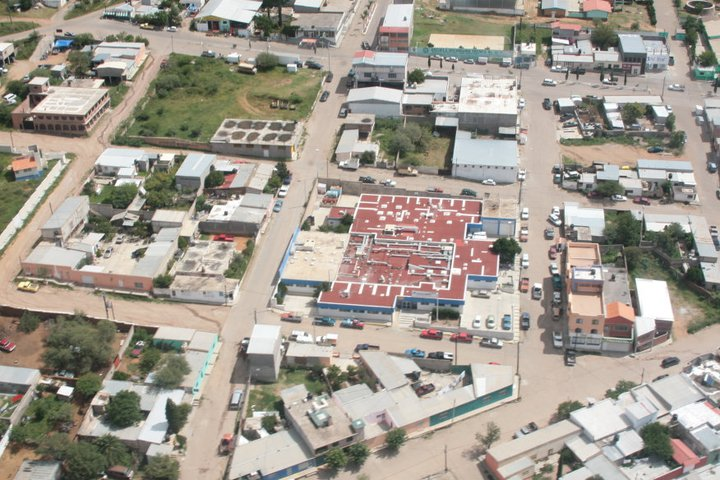
- Santa María del Oro from above

- Location in Mexico
- Coordinates: 25°56′N 105°22′W
- Country: Mexico
- State: Durango
- Municipality: El Oro
- Elevation: 1,703 m (5,587 ft)

Population (2010)
  - Total: 5,878

Santa María del Oro is a city and seat of the municipality of El Oro, in the state of Durango, Mexico. As of 2010, the city had a population of 5,878. Many Duranguense groups were born here either members of the band or the band as a whole like Alacranes Musical and Conjunto Atardecer.

== Climate ==
Climate data for Santa Maria del Oro (1991-2020 normals and extremes)
Month	Jan	Feb	Mar	Apr	May	Jun	Jul	Aug	Sep	Oct	Nov	Dec	Year
Record high °C (°F)	31.0 (87.8)	33.0 (91.4)	35.0 (95.0)	40.0 (104.0)	42.0 (107.6)	45.0 (113.0)	41.0 (105.8)	40.0 (104.0)	39.0 (102.2)	39.0 (102.2)	33.0 (91.4)	32.0 (89.6)	45.0 (113.0)
Mean daily maximum °C (°F)	16.5 (61.7)	18.4 (65.1)	21.4 (70.5)	25.2 (77.4)	28.7 (83.7)	29.2 (84.6)	26.3 (79.3)	26.0 (78.8)	24.3 (75.7)	22.7 (72.9)	19.3 (66.7)	16.5 (61.7)	22.9 (73.2)
Daily mean °C (°F)	7.3 (45.1)	9.4 (48.9)	12.4 (54.3)	15.8 (60.4)	19.0 (66.2)	20.7 (69.3)	19.2 (66.6)	18.8 (65.8)	17.3 (63.1)	14.4 (57.9)	10.3 (50.5)	7.5 (45.5)	14.3 (57.8)
Mean daily minimum °C (°F)	−1.9 (28.6)	0.5 (32.9)	3.3 (37.9)	6.4 (43.5)	9.3 (48.7)	12.2 (54.0)	12.1 (53.8)	11.6 (52.9)	10.3 (50.5)	6.2 (43.2)	1.3 (34.3)	−1.5 (29.3)	5.8 (42.5)
Record low °C (°F)	−14.0 (6.8)	−18.0 (−0.4)	−10.0 (14.0)	−5.0 (23.0)	−2.0 (28.4)	1.0 (33.8)	3.0 (37.4)	2.0 (35.6)	−0.5 (31.1)	−8.0 (17.6)	−12.5 (9.5)	−13.0 (8.6)	−18.0 (−0.4)
Average precipitation mm (inches)	7.7 (0.30)	4.6 (0.18)	8.8 (0.35)	5.3 (0.21)	11.8 (0.46)	54.3 (2.14)	133.8 (5.27)	111.6 (4.39)	98.7 (3.89)	29.8 (1.17)	13.4 (0.53)	7.8 (0.31)	487.6 (19.2)
Average precipitation days (≥ 0.1 mm)	2.2	1.3	1.2	1.1	2.9	8.4	15.6	13.8	12.3	5.0	2.1	1.5	67.4
Source: Servicio Meteorologico Nacional
