= El Oro Municipality, Durango =

Municipality in the Mexican state of Durango

El Oro
- Municipality
- Location in Durango

- Location in Mexico
- Coordinates: 25°56′58″N 105°21′52″W
- Country: Mexico
- State: Durango
- Municipal seat: Santa María del Oro

Area
  - Total: 3,559.0 km^{2} (1,374.1 sq mi)

Population (2010)
  - Total: 11,320
  - Density: 3.181/km^{2} (8.238/sq mi)
- Time zone: UTC-6 (Zona Centro)

El Oro (Spanish: [el ˈoɾo]) is a municipality in the Mexican state of Durango. The municipal seat lies at Santa María del Oro. The municipality covers an area of 10,041 km^{2}.

As of 2010, the municipality had a total population of 11,320, up from 10,501 as of 2005.

The municipality had 113 localities, the largest of which (with 2010 population in parentheses) was Santa María del Oro (5,878), classified as urban.
