= Vicente Guerrero, Durango =

City in the Mexican state of Durango

Vicente Guerrero
- Municipal seat and city
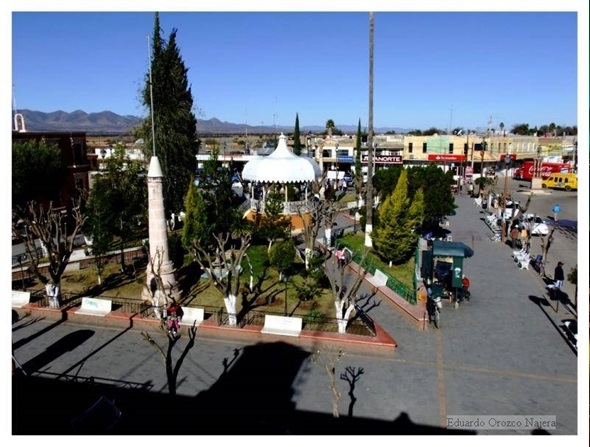
- Plaza de Armas

- Location in Mexico
- Coordinates: 23°45′N 103°59′W
- Country: Mexico
- State: Durango
- Municipality: Vicente Guerrero
- Elevation: 1,930 m (6,330 ft)

Population (2010)
  - Total: 15,982

Vicente Guerrero is a small city and seat of the Vicente Guerrero Municipality in the Mexican state of Durango. As of 2010, the city of Vicente Guerrero had a population of 15,982.

== Geography ==
=== Climate ===
Climate data for Vicente Guerrero, Durango (1991-2020)
Month	Jan	Feb	Mar	Apr	May	Jun	Jul	Aug	Sep	Oct	Nov	Dec	Year
Record high °C (°F)	29.5 (85.1)	32.0 (89.6)	33.0 (91.4)	36.0 (96.8)	38.0 (100.4)	39.0 (102.2)	36.0 (96.8)	39.0 (102.2)	32.0 (89.6)	33.0 (91.4)	34.0 (93.2)	30.0 (86.0)	39.0 (102.2)
Mean daily maximum °C (°F)	21.7 (71.1)	23.9 (75.0)	26.5 (79.7)	29.5 (85.1)	31.7 (89.1)	31.0 (87.8)	27.7 (81.9)	27.4 (81.3)	26.2 (79.2)	26.3 (79.3)	24.5 (76.1)	22.4 (72.3)	26.6 (79.9)
Daily mean °C (°F)	11.5 (52.7)	13.6 (56.5)	15.4 (59.7)	18.0 (64.4)	20.9 (69.6)	22.2 (72.0)	20.7 (69.3)	20.3 (68.5)	19.3 (66.7)	17.4 (63.3)	14.3 (57.7)	12.2 (54.0)	17.1 (62.8)
Mean daily minimum °C (°F)	1.3 (34.3)	3.2 (37.8)	4.3 (39.7)	6.5 (43.7)	10.0 (50.0)	13.5 (56.3)	13.7 (56.7)	13.3 (55.9)	12.3 (54.1)	8.4 (47.1)	4.2 (39.6)	2.0 (35.6)	7.7 (45.9)
Record low °C (°F)	−11.0 (12.2)	−10.0 (14.0)	−7.0 (19.4)	−3.0 (26.6)	1.0 (33.8)	5.0 (41.0)	4.5 (40.1)	4.0 (39.2)	2.0 (35.6)	−3.0 (26.6)	−8.0 (17.6)	−14.0 (6.8)	−14.0 (6.8)
Average precipitation mm (inches)	16.8 (0.66)	11.2 (0.44)	5.9 (0.23)	2.4 (0.09)	13.7 (0.54)	67.1 (2.64)	118.5 (4.67)	122.6 (4.83)	100.7 (3.96)	29.0 (1.14)	16.2 (0.64)	7.0 (0.28)	511.1 (20.12)
Average precipitation days (≥ 0.1 mm)	3.7	2.2	1.6	1.5	4.3	12.8	19.9	18.7	15.0	5.9	3.2	2.9	91.7
Source: Servicio Meteorologico Nacional
