= Indé Municipality =

Municipality in the Mexican state of Durango

Indé
- Municipality
- Municipality of Indé in Durango

- Location in Mexico
- Coordinates: 25°54′43″N 105°13′20″W
- Country: Mexico
- State: Durango
- Municipal seat: Indé

Area
  - Total: 2,370.9 km^{2} (915.4 sq mi)

Population (2010)
  - Total: 5,280
  - Density: 2.23/km^{2} (5.77/sq mi)
- Time zone: UTC-6 (Zona Centro)

Indé is a municipality in the Mexican state of Durango. The municipal seat lies at Indé. The municipality covers an area of 2370.9 km^{2}.

In 2010, the municipality had a total population of 5,280, up from 4,824 in 2005.

The municipality had 83 localities, none of which had a population over 1,000.
