= San Luis del Cordero =

City in the Mexican state of Durango

- Municipal seat and city
- Location in Mexico
- Coordinates: 25°25′N 104°16′W
- Country: Mexico
- State: Durango
- Municipality: San Luis del Cordero

Population (2010)
  - Total: 1,584

San Luis del Cordero is a city and seat of the municipality of San Luis del Cordero, in the state of Durango, north-western Mexico. As of 2010, the town of San Luis del Cordero had a population of 1,584.

== Climate ==
Climate data for San Luis del Cordero (1991–2020)
Month	Jan	Feb	Mar	Apr	May	Jun	Jul	Aug	Sep	Oct	Nov	Dec	Year
Record high °C (°F)	37 (99)	38 (100)	39 (102)	42 (108)	45 (113)	46 (115)	43 (109)	41 (106)	40 (104)	40 (104)	39 (102)	39 (102)	46 (115)
Mean daily maximum °C (°F)	23.0 (73.4)	26.5 (79.7)	29.9 (85.8)	33.1 (91.6)	36.0 (96.8)	36.1 (97.0)	34.0 (93.2)	33.6 (92.5)	31.6 (88.9)	29.8 (85.6)	26.5 (79.7)	22.8 (73.0)	30.2 (86.4)
Daily mean °C (°F)	13.2 (55.8)	15.9 (60.6)	19.1 (66.4)	22.2 (72.0)	25.7 (78.3)	26.9 (80.4)	26.1 (79.0)	25.4 (77.7)	23.6 (74.5)	20.8 (69.4)	17.1 (62.8)	13.4 (56.1)	20.8 (69.4)
Mean daily minimum °C (°F)	3.4 (38.1)	5.4 (41.7)	8.3 (46.9)	11.3 (52.3)	15.4 (59.7)	17.7 (63.9)	18.3 (64.9)	17.2 (63.0)	15.6 (60.1)	11.7 (53.1)	7.8 (46.0)	4.0 (39.2)	11.3 (52.3)
Record low °C (°F)	−9 (16)	−12 (10)	−2 (28)	−1.5 (29.3)	6 (43)	4 (39)	7 (45)	1 (34)	1 (34)	0 (32)	−5 (23)	−10 (14)	−12 (10)
Average precipitation mm (inches)	8.8 (0.35)	2.5 (0.10)	6.1 (0.24)	4.4 (0.17)	12.9 (0.51)	42.0 (1.65)	71.7 (2.82)	82.7 (3.26)	76.7 (3.02)	26.7 (1.05)	11.2 (0.44)	6.7 (0.26)	352.4 (13.87)
Average precipitation days (≥ 0.1 mm)	1.9	1.0	1.4	1.1	3.3	6.4	10.4	9.4	8.8	4.3	2.7	1.7	52.4
Source: Servicio Meteorologico Nacional
