= Gómez Palacio Municipality =

Municipality in the Mexican state of Durango

Gómez Palacio
- Municipality
- Coat of arms

- Location within Durango Location within Mexico
- Coordinates: 25°32′27″N 103°40′30″W
- Country: Mexico
- State: Durango
- Municipal seat: Gómez Palacio

Area
  - Total: 990.2 km^{2} (382.3 sq mi)

Population (2010)
  - Total: 327,985
  - Density: 331.2/km^{2} (857.9/sq mi)
- Time zone: UTC–06:00 (Zona Centro)

Gómez Palacio is a municipality in the Mexican state of Durango. The municipal seat lies at Gómez Palacio. The municipality covers an area of 990.2 km^{2}.

In 2010, the municipality had a total population of 327,985, up from 304,515 in 2005.

In 2010, the city of Gómez Palacio had a population of 257,352. Other than the city of Gómez Palacio, the municipality had 583 localities, the largest of which (with 2010 populations in parentheses) were: San Felipe (4,552), La Popular (3,406), Pastor Rouaix (2,696), classified as urban, and San Ramón (2,624), Transporte (2,624), El Vergel (2,257), Esmeralda (2,249), San José de Viñedo (1,984), Venecia (1,861), Arcinas (1,629), La Flor (1,593), Santa Cruz Luján (1,585), Jiménez (Jiménez Uno) (1,568), Seis de Octubre (1,528), Huitrón (1,511), Villa Gregorio García (1,446), Arturo Martínez Adame (1,251), Eureka de Media Luna (Eureka) (1,201), Puente de la Torreña (1,177), and California (1,032), classified as rural.
