= Indé =

Town in the Mexican state of Durango

- Municipal seat
- Location in Mexico
- Coordinates: 25°54′43″N 105°13′20″W
- Country: Mexico
- State: Durango
- Municipality: Indé

Population (2010)
  - Total: 659

Indé is the municipal seat of the municipality of Indé in the Mexican state of Durango. As of 2010, the town had a population of 659.

The village of Indé was founded in 1547.

== Climate ==
Climate data for Indé (1991–2020)
Month	Jan	Feb	Mar	Apr	May	Jun	Jul	Aug	Sep	Oct	Nov	Dec	Year
Record high °C (°F)	33.0 (91.4)	31.0 (87.8)	38.0 (100.4)	38.0 (100.4)	38.0 (100.4)	39.0 (102.2)	38.0 (100.4)	38.0 (100.4)	36.0 (96.8)	35.0 (95.0)	34.0 (93.2)	30.0 (86.0)	39.0 (102.2)
Mean daily maximum °C (°F)	19.1 (66.4)	20.9 (69.6)	23.8 (74.8)	26.4 (79.5)	29.5 (85.1)	30.0 (86.0)	28.8 (83.8)	28.4 (83.1)	26.9 (80.4)	25.8 (78.4)	22.2 (72.0)	19.2 (66.6)	25.1 (77.2)
Daily mean °C (°F)	12.7 (54.9)	14.7 (58.5)	17.3 (63.1)	19.5 (67.1)	22.2 (72.0)	23.4 (74.1)	22.3 (72.1)	22.1 (71.8)	20.8 (69.4)	19.6 (67.3)	16.0 (60.8)	13.2 (55.8)	18.6 (65.5)
Mean daily minimum °C (°F)	6.2 (43.2)	8.4 (47.1)	10.8 (51.4)	12.6 (54.7)	15.0 (59.0)	16.7 (62.1)	15.8 (60.4)	15.8 (60.4)	14.6 (58.3)	13.5 (56.3)	9.9 (49.8)	7.2 (45.0)	12.2 (54.0)
Record low °C (°F)	−9.0 (15.8)	−7.0 (19.4)	−1.0 (30.2)	0.0 (32.0)	0.0 (32.0)	0.0 (32.0)	0.0 (32.0)	0.0 (32.0)	8.0 (46.4)	−6.0 (21.2)	−4.0 (24.8)	−8.0 (17.6)	−9.0 (15.8)
Average precipitation mm (inches)	4.3 (0.17)	1.2 (0.05)	9.2 (0.36)	7.3 (0.29)	7.8 (0.31)	51.0 (2.01)	84.2 (3.31)	87.0 (3.43)	61.1 (2.41)	17.4 (0.69)	9.5 (0.37)	7.3 (0.29)	347.3 (13.67)
Average precipitation days (≥ 0.1 mm)	1.1	0.6	1.2	1.2	2.6	7.6	12.2	10.3	7.5	3.9	3.3	2.5	54.0
Source: Servicio Meteorologico Nacional
