= Hidalgo Municipality, Durango =

Municipality in the Mexican state of Durango

Hidalgo
- Municipality
- Location within Durango Location within Mexico
- Coordinates: 26°16′N 104°54′W
- Country: Mexico
- State: Durango
- Municipal seat: Villa Hidalgo

Area
  - Total: 5,020.8 km^{2} (1,938.5 sq mi)

Population (2010)
  - Total: 4,265
  - Density: 0.8495/km^{2} (2.200/sq mi)
- Time zone: UTC-6 (Zona Centro)

Hidalgo is a municipality in the Mexican state of Durango. The municipal seat lies at Villa Hidalgo. The municipality covers an area of 5020.8 km^{2}.

As of 2010, the municipality had a total population of 4,265.

The municipality had 115 localities, none of which had a population over 1,000.
