= Vicente Guerrero Municipality, Durango =

Municipality in the Mexican state of Durango

Vicente Guerrero
- Municipality
- Location in Mexico Vicente Guerrero (Mexico)
- Coordinates: 23°44′03″N 103°59′12″W
- Country: Mexico
- State: Durango
- Municipal seat: Vicente Guerrero

Area
  - Total: 402.24 km^{2} (155.31 sq mi)

Population (2010)
  - Total: 21,117
  - Density: 52.499/km^{2} (135.97/sq mi)
- Time zone: UTC-6 (Zona Centro)

Vicente Guerrero is a municipality in the Mexican state of Durango. The municipal seat lies at Vicente Guerrero. The municipality covers an area of 402.24 km^{2} and is composed of 19 localities.

As of 2010, the municipality had a total population of 21,117, up from 20,614 as of 2005. As of 2010, the city of Vicente Guerrero had a population of 15,982. Other than the city of Vicente Guerrero, the municipality had 31 localities, the largest of which (with 2010 population in parentheses) was: San Francisco Javier (1,669), classified as rural.

It was named for Independence War hero and early President Vicente Guerrero. It is now home to about 200 restaurants and other places to visit, including museums, historical places, and rides. Spanish is the spoken language of the region, although there are approximately 150 speakers of indigenous languages. Vicente Guerrero's principal economic activities are agriculture and ranching.

== History ==
The area was first visited by European explorer Francisco de Ibarra in 1554, while he was looking for silver deposits. It was later part of the Spanish territory of Nueva Vizcaya, and was part of the Condado del Valle de Súchil (Súchil Valley County), established in 1766.

The region came to some recognition during the Mexican Revolution, as Vicente Guerrero's underground tunneled road system was used during the period. The area is also home to the indigenous Muchi people.

The town was formed as an ejido within Muleros by José Guadalupe Rodríguez in 1920.

The locality of Vicente Guerrero received full city status on July 8, 1976.

Notable participants in the Mexican Revolution from the area include Leónides Guerrero, Miguel and Arturo Canales, Marcelino Rueda, Florencio Salas, and J. Mercedes Rodríguez.
