= Mapimí =

Mapimí may refer to any of several geographical features in Mexico:

- Mapimí, Durango, a city
- Mapimí (municipality), its surrounding municipality
- Bolsón de Mapimí, an endorheic river basin
- Mapimí Biosphere Reserve
- The Mapimí Silent Zone, an alleged pocket of radio silence
