= Ianbruceite =

Rare hydrated zinc arsenate

General
- Category: Zinc arsenates
- Formula: [Zn_{2}(OH)(H_{2}O)(AsO_{4})](H_{2}O)_{2}
- IMA symbol: Ibc
- Strunz classification: 8.DA.50
- Dana classification: 42 (hydrated phosphates, arsenates and vanadates containing hydroxyl or halogen)
- Crystal system: Monoclinic
- Crystal class: Prismatic (2/m) (same H-M symbol)
- Space group: P2_{1}/b

Identification
- Color: Sky blue to very pale blue at Tsumeb, white to pale pink in the Caldbeck Fells
- Crystal habit: Radiating aggregates of lath-like crystals with a distinctive diamond-shaped outline {100}
- Cleavage: Perfect parallel to (100)
- Fracture: Crystals are flexible and deform plastically
- Mohs scale hardness: 1
- Luster: Vitreous
- Streak: White
- Specific gravity: Calculated, 3.197
- Optical properties: Biaxial
- Refractive index: n_{α} = 1.601, n_{β} = 1.660, n_{γ} = 1.662
- Solubility: Insoluble in dilute acid
- Other characteristics: It may dehydrate, and it can readily absorb alcohol. Not fluorescent under ultraviolet light

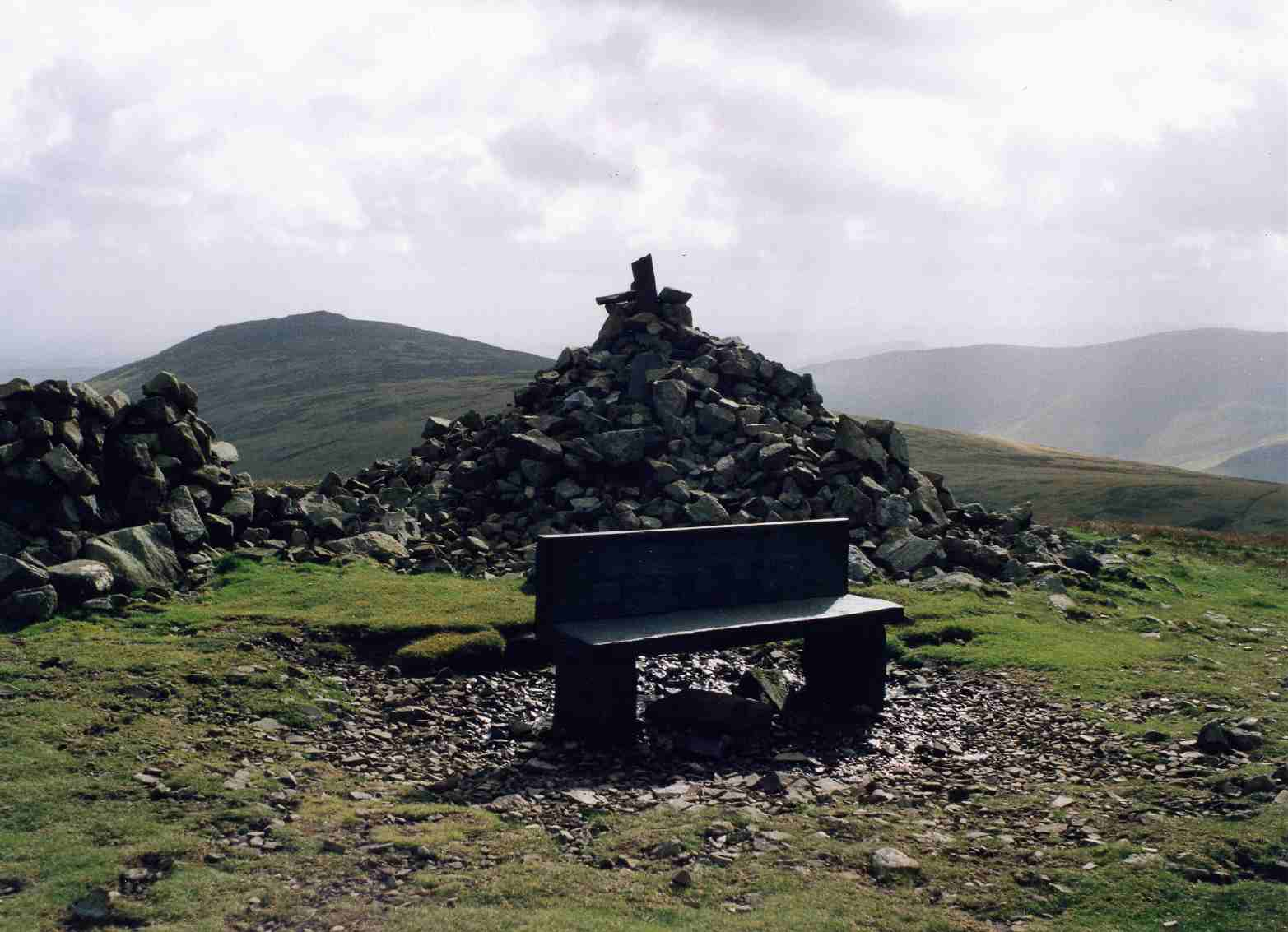
High Pike Summit

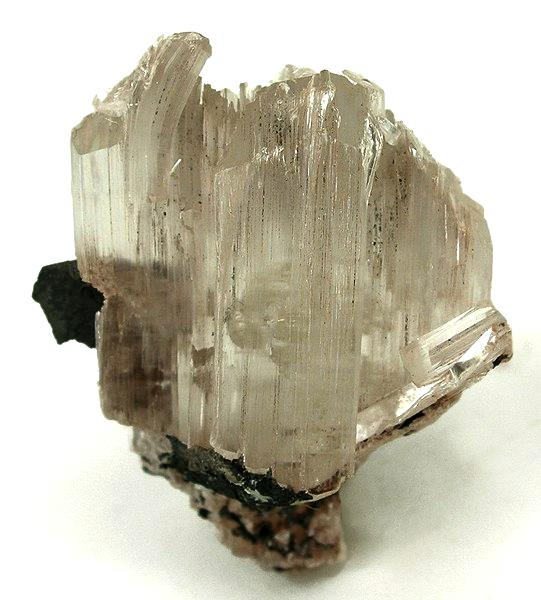
Leiteite

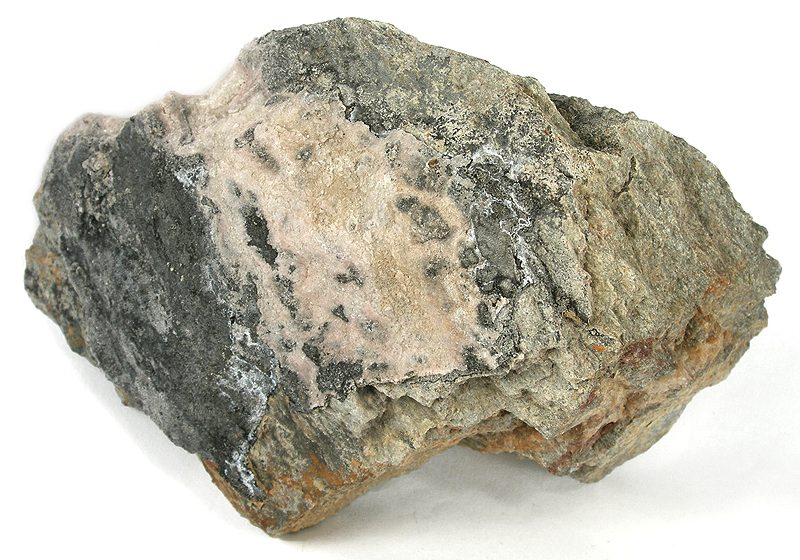
Köttigite

Ianbruceite is a rare hydrated zinc arsenate with the formula [Zn_{2}(OH)(H_{2}O)(AsO_{4})](H_{2}O)_{2}; material from the Driggith mine has traces of cobalt. It was first discovered at Tsumeb, approved by the International Mineralogical Association as a new mineral species in 2011, reference IMA2011-49, and named for Ian Bruce, who founded "Crystal Classics" in the early 1990s, and was heavily involved in attempts to reopen the famous Tsumeb mine for specimen mining.
In 2013 new occurrences of ianbruceite were reported from the neighbouring Driggith and Potts Gill mines on High Pike in the Caldbeck Fells, Cumbria, England. Here the mineral is probably a post-mining product. Caldbeck Fells and Tsumeb are the only reported localities for ianbruceite to date (May 2013).

== Structure ==
There are four formula units per unit cell (Z = 4). Unit cell parameters are the lengths of the sides of the unit cell, a, b and c, and the angle β between the a and c crystal axes. For ianbruceite a = 11.793 Å, b = 9.1138 Å, c = 6.8265 Å, and β = 103.859°. It belongs in the monoclinic, prismatic crystal Class 2/m, with space group P2_{1}/c.
Ianbruceite consists of layers with composition [Zn_{2}(OH)(H_{2}O)(AsO_{4})] alternating with an inter-layer space containing loosely bound water molecules. The arsenic is tetrahedrally coordinated by four oxygen anions.

== Appearance ==
Ianbruceite occurs as aggregates of tiny, radiating, lath-like crystals with a distinctive diamond-shaped outline, up to 0.2 mm across. Material from Tsumeb is blue, ranging from a very pale color to deep blue. Material from the Caldbeck Fells is white to pale pink. The crystals have a vitreous luster and a white streak.

== Optical properties ==
The refractive indices of ianbruceite are similar to that of ordinary window glass, with n_{α} = 1.601, n_{β} = 1.660 and n_{γ} = 1.662. The refractive index varies with the wavelength (color) of light, so the positions of the optic axes in biaxial crystals, and the angle 2V between them, will change when the color of the incident light is changed. This effect may be expressed in the form r > v, indicating that the angle 2V is greater for red than for violet light, or vice versa. For ianbruceite 2V is greater for violet light than for red light, v > r. The angle 2V has been measured as 18°; it can also be calculated from the values of the refractive indices α, β and γ, giving a value of 20°. The mineral does not fluoresce in ultraviolet light.

== Physical properties ==
Cleavage is perfect parallel to (100). Crystals of ianbruceite are flexible and deform plastically. The mineral is very soft, with Mohs hardness only 1, the same as talc. Measurements of the specific gravity have not been reported, but from the formula and the cell dimensions it has been calculated as 3.197. It is insoluble in dilute acid, which distinguishes it from hydrozincite and aragonite, which are also supergene minerals that form white crusts. The loosely bound water between the layers is easily lost, so the mineral may effloresce. It also readily absorbs alcohol.

== Occurrence ==
The type locality is the Tsumeb Mine, Otjikoto Region, Namibia. Type material is conserved in the Department of Natural History, Royal Ontario Museum, Toronto, Ontario, Canada, catalogue number M53150.

At localities in the Caldbeck Fells ianbruceite occurs as a late-stage supergene mineral in fractures in partly oxidised sulfide-rich carbonate or quartz-carbonate matrix. The mines of Caldbeck Fells are famous for their supergene minerals. Driggith and Potts Gill Mines worked low temperature lead-zinc-copper veins on the eastern and northern slopes of High Pike. Arsenopyrite is abundant there, and its oxidation in veins that also contain primary lead, zinc and copper sulfides has produced a range of supergene arsenates.

At the Driggith Mine, Caldbeck Fells, Cumbria, on dumps from the 30 fathom level, radiating aggregates of lath-like crystals of ianbruceite have been found in fractures in quartz-dolomite matrix with sphalerite, chalcopyrite and cobalt-bearing köttigite as rounded pink aggregates, or more rarely pale pink to colorless monoclinic blades, as well as irregular black patches of a cobalt-bearing manganese oxide, adamite and an unidentified copper silicate. At the nearby Potts Gill Mine, Caldbeck Fells, Cumbria, on dumps from the Endeavor level, it has been found as minute, pearly, lath-like crystals in fractures in arsenopyrite-rich dolomite. One block of material contained abundant marcasite, galena, sphalerite and minor fine-grained arsenopyrite, in dolomitic matrix.

In Namibia ianbruceite has been found in the zinc pocket at the 44 Level, Tsumeb Mine, as sky blue to very pale blue platy crystals associated with leiteite, köttigite, legrandite and adamite. It occurs as thin platy crystals up to 80 μm long and a few μm thick, which form flattened aggregates up to 0.10 mm across, and ellipsoidal aggregates up to 0.5 mm across, associated with coarse white leiteite, dark blue köttigite, minor legrandite and adamite.
