= Paradamite =

Rare zinc arsenate mineral

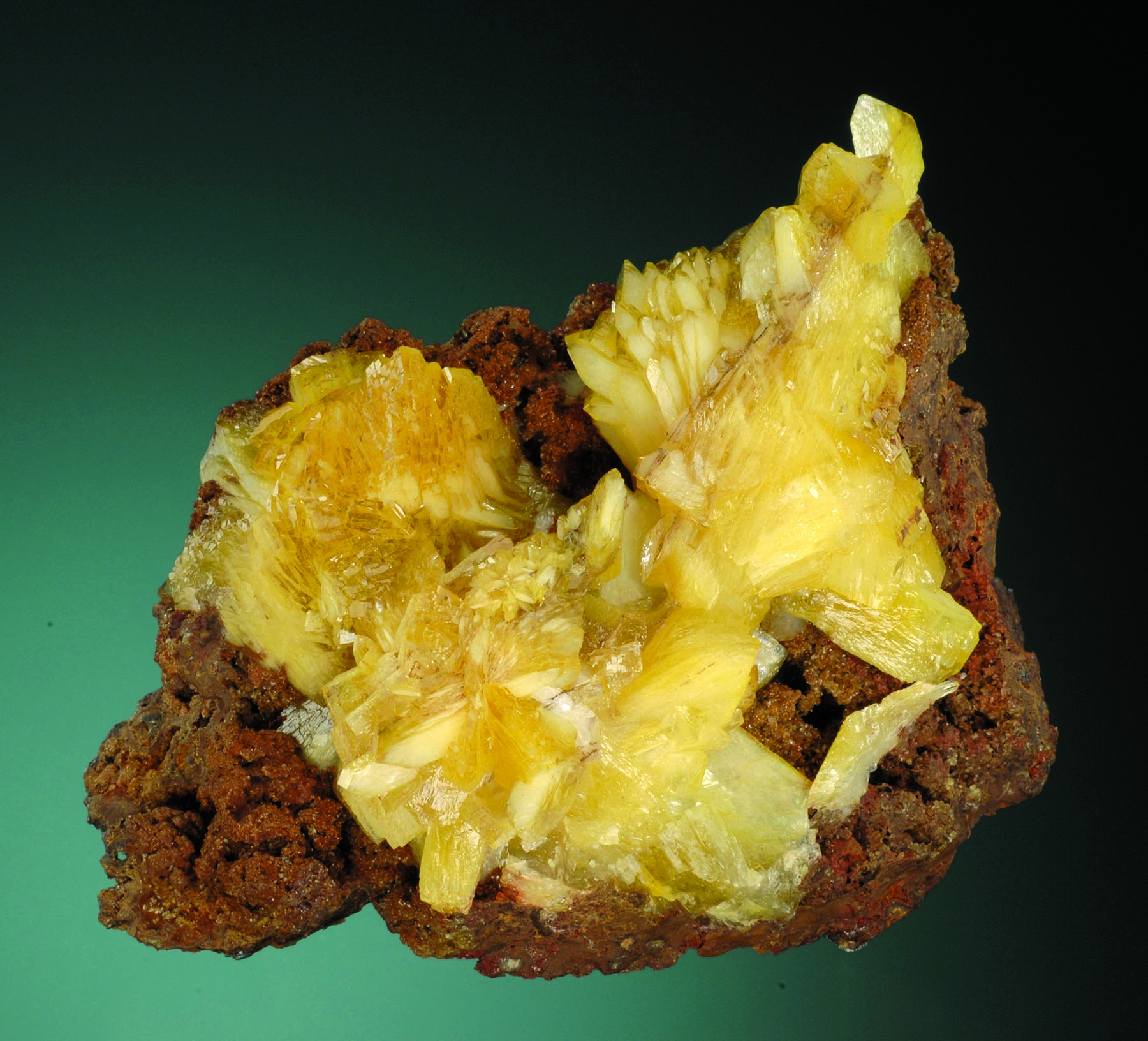
- Paradamite from the Ojuela Mine, Mapimí, Durango, Mexico

General
- Category: Arsenate minerals
- Formula: Zn_{2}(AsO_{4})(OH)
- IMA symbol: Prd
- Strunz classification: 8.BB.35
- Crystal system: Triclinic
- Space group: P1

Identification
- Color: Pale to lemon yellow, yellow-orange; rarely white
- Crystal habit: Sheaf-like aggregates; blocky or lozenge-shaped crystals
- Cleavage: Perfect on {010}
- Tenacity: Brittle
- Mohs scale hardness: 3.5
- Luster: Vitreous to sub-vitreous, resinous
- Streak: White
- Diaphaneity: Transparent to translucent
- Specific gravity: 4.55 (measured)
- Optical properties: Biaxial (–)
- Refractive index: nα = 1.726, nβ = 1.771, nγ = 1.780
- Birefringence: 0.054
- 2V angle: Measured: 50°; calculated: 46°
- Dispersion: Relatively strong

Paradamite is a very rare zinc arsenate mineral with the chemical formula Zn_{2}(AsO_{4})(OH). It is closely related to the better-known mineral adamite: both have the same chemical composition, but the atoms are arranged differently in the crystals. Because of this different structure, paradamite and adamite belong to different crystal systems (triclinic for paradamite, orthorhombic for adamite) and are considered polymorphs of each other.

In the mineral list of the Commission on New Minerals, Nomenclature and Classification of the International Mineralogical Association (IMA–CNMNC), paradamite has the approved symbol Prd.

Paradamite was first described in 1956 by American mineralogist George Switzer from specimens collected at the Ojuela Mine, Mapimí, Durango, Mexico, which remains the type and best-known locality for Palenzonaite. It forms as a secondary mineral in the oxidised parts of polymetallic ore deposits and is typically associated with other zinc arsenates such as adamite and legrandite.

== Discovery and naming ==
Paradamite was recognised as a distinct mineral species during Switzer's study of yellow zinc arsenate specimens from the Ojuela Mine. Laboratory work with single-crystal X-ray diffraction showed that some crystals which looked like adamite had a different structure and belonged to the triclinic crystal system. The new mineral was named paradamite, from the Greek prefix para- ("near" or "beside") and adamite, to show that it is closely related to, but not the same as, adamite.

Paradamite is on display in several museum collections, including the Natural History Museum (London), Harvard University, and the National Museum of Natural History (Smithsonian Institution).

== Crystal structure ==
At the atomic scale, paradamite is made of zinc cations, arsenate (AsO_{4}) groups and hydroxyl (OH) groups linked together in a three-dimensional framework. X-ray studies show that it crystallises in the triclinic system, space group P1, with unit-cell parameters of about a = 5.84 Å, b = 6.72 Å, c = 5.66 Å, α ≈ 104.3°, β ≈ 92.3°, γ ≈ 76.7°, and Z = 2.

In this structure, each zinc atom is surrounded by five oxygen atoms in a distorted polyhedron (often described as a strongly distorted octahedron or trigonal bipyramid). These zinc–oxygen units are linked to arsenate tetrahedra to form chains and sheets that connect into a framework. The hydroxyl group sits within this framework, and its hydrogen forms hydrogen bonds to neighbouring oxygen atoms. The pattern of these hydrogen bonds helps stabilise the triclinic structure of paradamite and is one of the key differences from the orthorhombic structure of adamite.

Earlier crystallographic studies refined the unit-cell parameters and clarified how paradamite fits into the broader family of zinc phosphates and arsenates that share similar structural building blocks, sometimes referred to as the tarbuttite group.

== Classification and related species ==
Paradamite belongs to a small group of zinc minerals that all share a similar atomic structure. In this group, some minerals contain phosphate groups (PO_{4}, with phosphorus) and others contain arsenate groups (AsO_{4}, with arsenic). Paradamite and adamite have the same chemical formula, Zn_{2}(AsO_{4})(OH), but different crystal structures. Because of this they are considered polymorphs: adamite crystallises in the orthorhombic system, while paradamite is triclinic.

In mineral classification schemes such as the Strunz and Dana systems, paradamite is placed among phosphates and arsenates that contain hydroxyl (OH) groups but do not contain water molecules in their crystal structure.

== Physical and optical properties ==
Paradamite usually forms pale to lemon-yellow or yellow-orange crystals, while white crystals are also found. Crystals are often platy or prismatic and may be slightly rounded. They commonly occur in radiating aggregates up to a few millimetres across. The lustre is vitreous to sub-vitreous or resinous, the streak is white, and the mineral is transparent to translucent. Cleavage is perfect on {010}, and the mineral is brittle when broken.

On the Mohs scale, paradamite has a hardness of about 3.5, so it can be scratched by a knife blade or a copper coin. The measured specific gravity is about 4.55, which is relatively high and reflects the presence of zinc and arsenic in the structure.

Optically, paradamite is a biaxial(–) mineral. Reported refractive indices are approximately nα = 1.726, nβ = 1.771 and nγ = 1.780, with a birefringence of about 0.054 and a measured 2V angle close to 50°. It is usually described as non-pleochroic in transmitted light and non-fluorescent under ultraviolet light. Powder X-ray diffraction patterns and Raman spectra for paradamite have been published by the RRUFF project.

== Occurrence and paragenesis ==
Paradamite is a very rare secondary mineral that forms in the oxidised zones of polymetallic Zn–Pb–Ag–Cu deposits, where primary sulphide minerals have been altered by oxygen-rich fluids. At the Ojuela Mine in Durango, Mexico, paradamite is found with limonitic and goethitic alteration products and is associated with adamite, legrandite, smithsonite, austinite, ojuelaite, hydrozincite and a variety of other arsenate and carbonate minerals.

Ojuela is known for its brightly coloured arsenate minerals and is the discovery location for paradamite. Outside Mexico, paradamite has been found in only a few places worldwide. This includes the Tsumeb Mine in Namibia, where it occurs in a similar oxidised polymetallic environment. Because it is rare and can look very similar to adamite, some older "adamite" specimens may in fact contain unrecognised paradamite.

== See also ==
- Adamite
- Legrandite
- Tarbuttite
- Ojuela
