= Erythrite =

Hydrated cobalt arsenate mineral

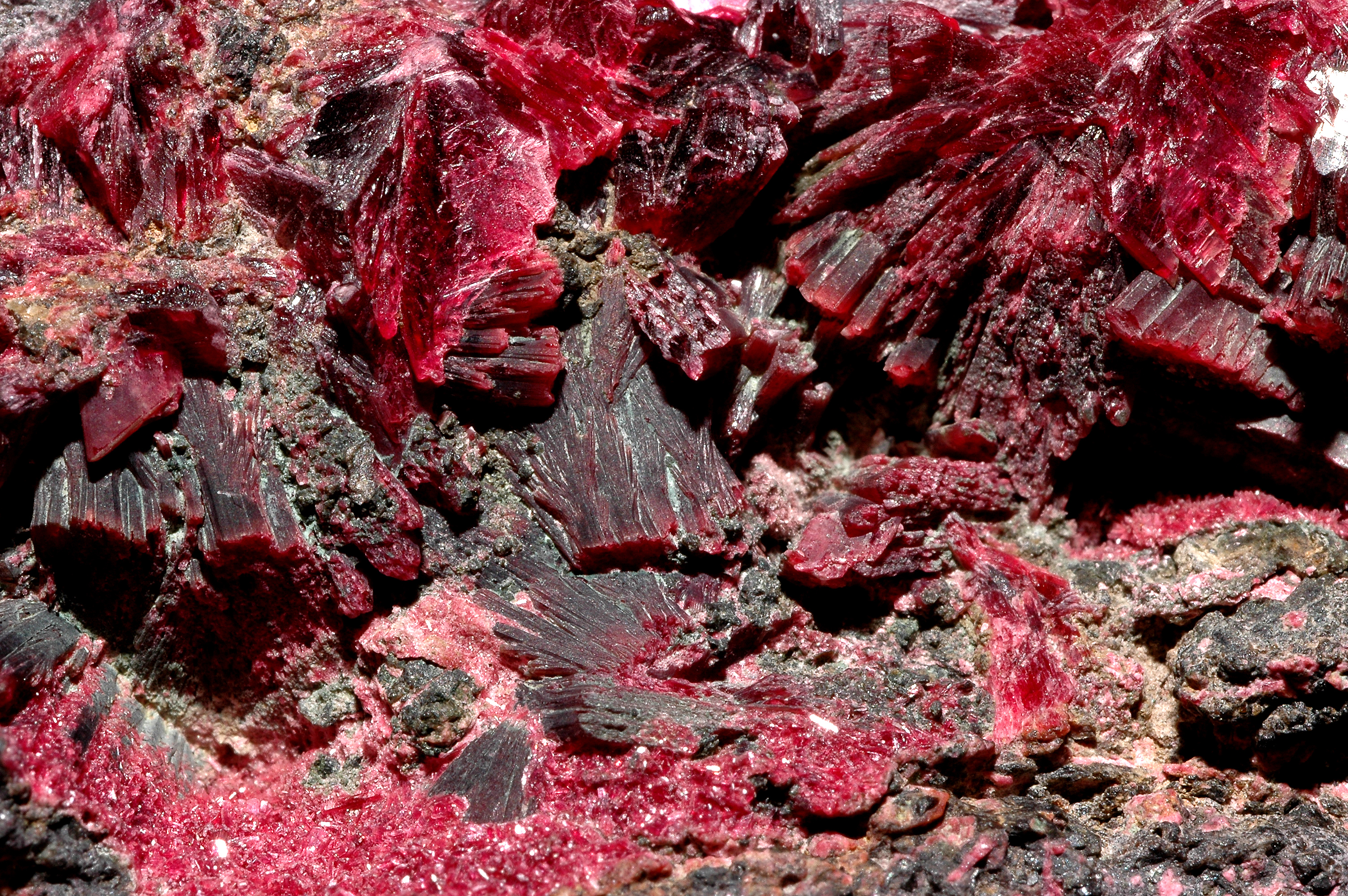

General
- Category: Arsenate mineral
- Formula: Co_{3}(AsO_{4})_{2}·8H_{2}O
- IMA symbol: Ery
- Strunz classification: 8.CE.40
- Dana classification: 40.03.06.03
- Crystal system: Monoclinic
- Crystal class: Prismatic (2/m) (same H-M symbol)
- Space group: C2/m

Identification
- Color: Crimson to peach-red, pale rose, or pink, may be zoned
- Crystal habit: Radial or stellate aggregates, fibrous, drusy; usually powdery and massive – rarely as striated prismatic crystals
- Cleavage: Perfect on {010}; poor on {100} and {1̅02}.
- Tenacity: Sectile
- Mohs scale hardness: 1.5–2.5
- Luster: Subadamantine, pearly on cleavages
- Streak: Pale red to pink
- Diaphaneity: Transparent to translucent
- Specific gravity: 3.06
- Optical properties: Biaxial (+)
- Refractive index: n_{α} = 1.626 – 1.629 n_{β} = 1.662 – 1.663 n_{γ} = 1.699 – 1.701
- Birefringence: δ = 0.073
- Pleochroism: Visible: X = pale pinkish to pale rose; Y = pale violet to pale violet-rose; Z = deep red

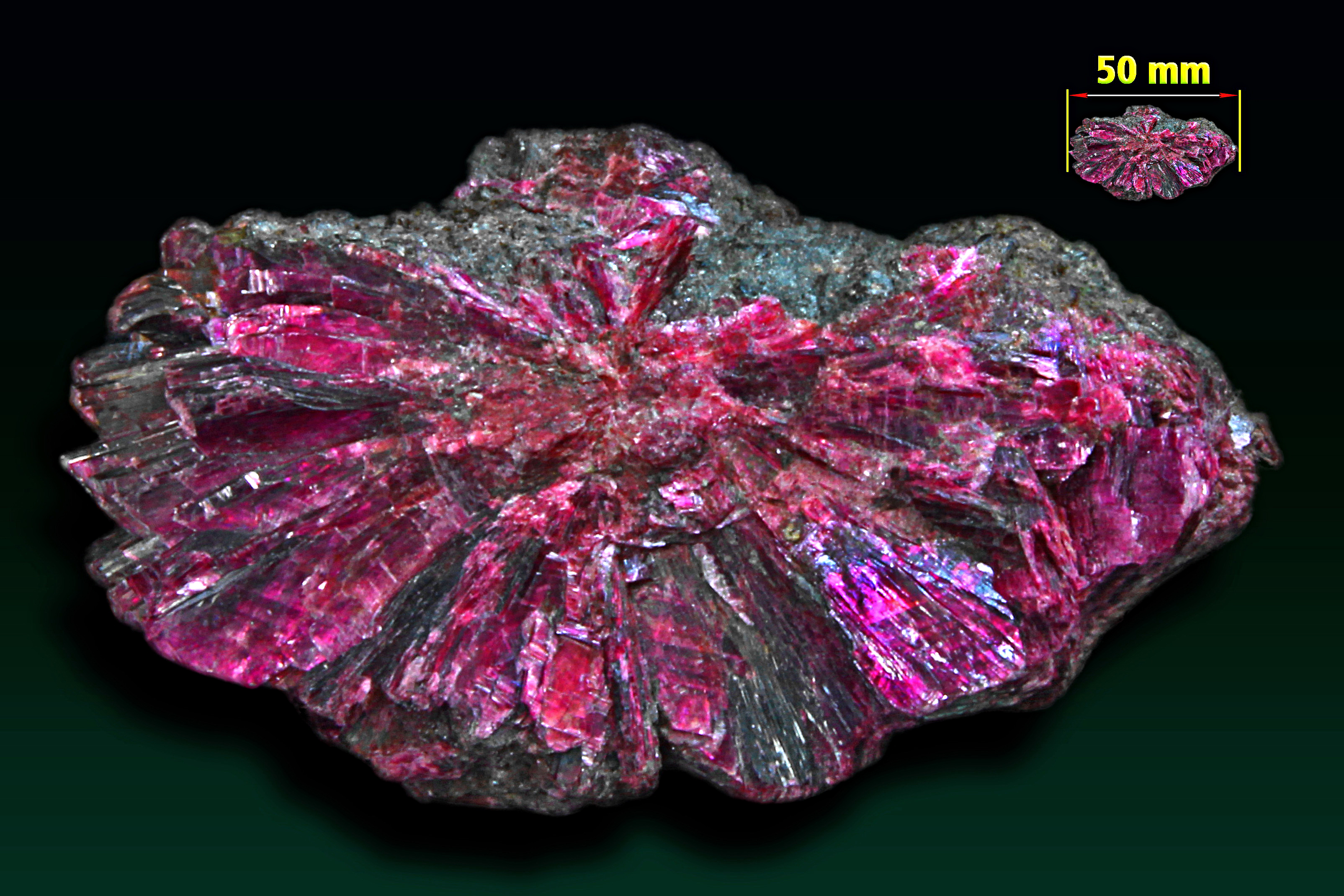
Erythrite (cobalt flower) - Bou Azzer, Atlas Mountains, Morocco.

Erythrite, also known as red cobalt, previously cobalt ochre is a secondary hydrated cobalt arsenate mineral with the formula Co_{3}(AsO_{4})_{2}•8H_{2}O. Erythrite and annabergite, chemical formula Ni_{3}(AsO_{4})_{2}•8H_{2}O, or nickel arsenate form a complete series with the general formula (Co,Ni)_{3}(AsO_{4})_{2}•8H_{2}O.

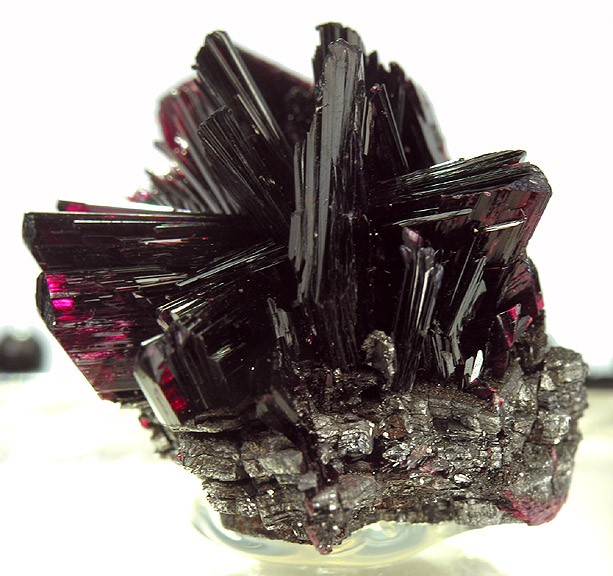
Erythrite crystals

Erythrite crystallizes in the monoclinic system and forms prismatic crystals. The color is crimson to pink and occurs as a secondary coating known as cobalt bloom on cobalt arsenide minerals. Well-formed crystals are rare, with most of the mineral manifesting in crusts or small reniform aggregates.

Erythrite was first described in 1832 for an occurrence in Grube Daniel, Schneeberg, Saxony, and takes its name from the Greek έρυθρος (erythros), meaning red. Historically, erythrite itself has not been an economically important mineral, but the prospector may use it as a guide to associated cobalt and native silver.

Erythrite occurs as a secondary mineral in the oxide zone of Co–Ni–As bearing mineral deposits. It occurs in association with cobaltite, skutterudite, symplesite, roselite-beta, scorodite, pharmacosiderite, adamite, morenosite, retgersite, and malachite.

Notable localities are Cobalt, Ontario; La Cobaltera, Chile, Schneeberg, Saxony, Germany; Joachimsthal, Czech Republic; Cornwall, England; Bou Azzer, Morocco; the Blackbird mine, Lemhi County, Idaho; Sara Alicia mine, near Alamos, Sonora, Mexico; Mt. Cobalt, Queensland and the Dome Rock copper mine, Mingary, South Australia.

== Other varieties ==
The nickel variety, annabergite, occurs as a light green nickel bloom on nickel arsenides. In addition iron, magnesium and zinc can also substitute for the cobalt position, creating three other minerals: parasymplesite (Fe), hörnesite (Mg) and köttigite (Zn).
