= Cabrerite =

Arsenate mineral

General
- Category: Arsenate minerals
- Formula: NiMg_{2}(AsO_{4})_{2}·8H_{2}O
- Strunz classification: 8.CE.40
- Crystal system: Monoclinic
- Crystal class: Prismatic (2/m) (same H-M symbol)
- Space group: C2/m
- Unit cell: a = 10.205(1), b = 13.377(1) c = 4.7382(4) [Å]; β = 105.057(7)°; Z = 2

Identification

Cabrerite is an arsenate mineral bearing magnesium and nickel. It is a member of the hörnesite-annabergite series in the vivianite group.

The name Cabrerite has been in use for any annabergite with notable incorporation of magnesium, typically nickel remaining the dominant ion. It was specified to refer to specimens with a Ni:Mg ratio of 1:2 in 2024.
