= Köttigite =

Rare hydrated zinc arsenate

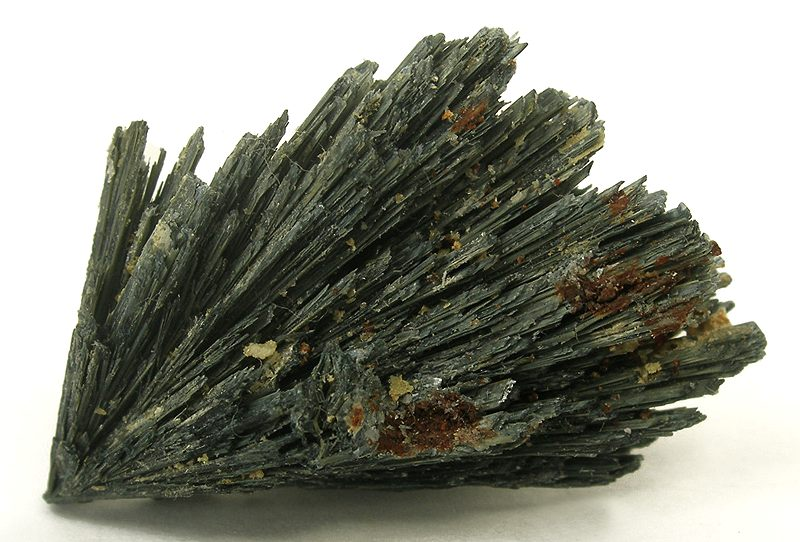

General
- Category: Arsenate mineral
- Formula: Zn_{3}(AsO_{4})_{2}·8H_{2}O
- IMA symbol: Köt
- Strunz classification: 8.CE.40 (10 ed.); VII/C.13-90 (8 ed.)
- Dana classification: 40.3.6.5
- Crystal system: Monoclinic
- Crystal class: Prismatic (2/m) (same H-M symbol)
- Space group: C2/m

Identification
- Formula mass: 618.13 g/mol
- Colour: Colourless, pink, red, red-orange or brown; light rose-pink in transmitted light
- Crystal habit: Crystals prismatic [001] and flattened {010}. Also in crusts with a crystalline surface and fibrous structure
- Cleavage: Perfect on {010}
- Fracture: Fibrous fracture yields a silky lustre
- Tenacity: Flexible
- Mohs scale hardness: 2 1/2 to 3
- Lustre: Resinous or waxy, silky on fracture
- Streak: Reddish-white to white
- Diaphaneity: Translucent
- Specific gravity: 3.33
- Optical properties: Biaxial (+)
- Refractive index: n_{α} = 1.622 n_{β} = 1.638 n_{γ} = 1.671
- Birefringence: δ = 0.049
- Pleochroism: Visible. X, Y = colourless, Z = pale red.
- Solubility: Soluble in acids
- Other characteristics: Not fluorescent

Köttigite is a rare hydrated zinc arsenate which was discovered in 1849 and named by James Dwight Dana in 1850 in honour of Otto Friedrich Köttig (1824–1892), a German chemist from Schneeberg, Saxony, who made the first chemical analysis of the mineral. It has the formula Zn_{3}(AsO_{4})_{2}·8H_{2}O and it is a dimorph of metaköttigite, which means that the two minerals have the same formula, but a different structure: köttigite is monoclinic and metaköttigite is triclinic. There are several minerals with similar formulae but with other cations in place of the zinc. Iron forms parasymplesite Fe^{2+}_{3}(AsO_{4})_{2}·8H_{2}O; cobalt forms the distinctively coloured pinkish purple mineral erythrite Co_{3}(AsO_{4})_{2}·8H_{2}O and nickel forms annabergite Ni_{3}(AsO_{4})_{2}·8H_{2}O. Köttigite forms series with all three of these minerals and they are all members of the vivianite group.

The Vivianite Group is a group of monoclinic phosphates and arsenates with divalent cations. The group members are annabergite, arupite, babanekite, baricite, erythrite, hornesite, kottingite, manganhornesite, pakhomovskyite, parasymplesite and vivianite.

== Structure ==
Köttigite belongs to the monoclinic crystal system, so it has two crystal axes, a and c, inclined to each other at angle β, and a third axis, the b axis, at right angles to both a and c. It belongs to point group 2/m, which means that it has a two-fold axis of rotational symmetry parallel to b, and a mirror plane perpendicular to it. The space group is C2/m, which means that the unit cell is centred on the C face.

Although zinc is the only transition metal that appears in the formula, köttigite usually contains significant quantities of cobalt and nickel, and these three elements are randomly distributed over the cation sites to form complex slabs perpendicular to the b axis. These sheets are held together by hydrogen bonding alone, which is quite weak, hence the perfect cleavage in this direction.

There are two formula units per unit cell (Z = 2) and the cell parameters are a = 10.24 Å, b = 13.405 Å, c = 4.757 Å and β = 105.21°.

== Appearance ==
Pure end-member köttigite is colourless, but frequently samples are coloured pink, red, red-orange or brown by elements substituting for the zinc. It is light rose-pink in transmitted light, translucent with a reddish-white to white streak and a resinous or waxy lustre, silky on fractures. Crystals are small, prismatic parallel to the c axis and flattened perpendicular to the b axis. It also occurs as massive crusts with a crystalline surface and fibrous structure.

== Optical properties ==
The mineral is biaxial (+) with refractive indices n_{α} = 1.622, n_{β} = 1.638 and n_{γ} = 1.671. The maximum birefringence δ is the difference between the largest and the smallest refractive index, and is equal to 0.049.

Biaxial crystals have two optic axes, and the angle between them is known as the optic angle, 2V. For köttigite 2V has a measured value of 74°, and a calculated value of 72°.

Biaxial crystals have three mutually perpendicular principal optical direction, named X, Y and Z. Light travels at different speeds in different directions through the crystal. X is the direction of travel at the highest speed, Z at the lowest, and Y intermediate. The orientation is given by expressing the relationship of X, Y and Z to the crystallographic axes a, b and c. In monoclinic crystals one of the principal optical directions X, Y and Z coincides with the b axis. Since X, Y and Z are mutually perpendicular, it suffices to define just two of them, then the third is determined. For köttigite X=b and Z^c=37°.

Pleochroism is visible, with the crystal appearing colourless when viewed along X or Y, and pale red when viewed along Z. Pleochroism should not be present if the mineral is colourless. It is not fluorescent.

== Physical properties ==
Köttigite is soft, with Mohs hardness only 2 1/2 to 3, even softer than calcite, which has a hardness of 3. It is also fairly light, with specific gravity 3.33. Because of its sheetlike structure it has perfect cleavage perpendicular to the b axis; it is flexible, and has a fibrous fracture giving it a silky lustre on cleavage surfaces. It is soluble in acids.

== Occurrence and associations ==
It is formed by the alteration of smaltite (Co,Fe,Ni)As_{2} and sphalerite ZnS. in oxidized zones of arsenical ores containing zinc. The type locality is the Daniel Mine (St. Daniel Mine), Neustädtel, Schneeberg District, Erzgebirge, Saxony, Germany, where it occurs in oxidized veins in a hydrothermal sulfide ore deposit, associated with roselite Ca_{2}(Co^{2+},Mg)(AsO_{4})_{2}·8H_{2}O.

At the Ojuela Mine, Mapimí Municipality, Mexico, it occurs in sprays of bladed crystals to 6 mm, which is large for the species, associated with symplesite Fe^{2+}_{3}(AsO_{4})_{2}·8H_{2}O, parasymplesite Fe^{2+}_{3}(AsO_{4})_{2}·8H_{2}O, adamite Zn_{2}(AsO_{4})(OH), legrandite Zn_{2}(AsO_{4})(OH)·H_{2}O, metaköttigite Zn_{3}(AsO_{4})_{2}·8H_{2}O and gypsum Ca(SO_{4})·2H_{2}O.

At the Hilton Mine, Cumbria, England, köttigite has been found in a specimen of galena PbS and gersdorffite NiAsS (but no sphalerite), on a surface coated with annabergite Ni_{3}(AsO_{4})_{2}·8H_{2}O and an earthy crust. The individual crystals are colourless, transparent, and very small, the largest being about 1 mm.

At Bou Azzer, Taznakht, Morocco, köttigite has been identified in a sample of vein quartz SiO_{2} rich in chalcopyrite CuFeS_{2} and sphalerite ZnS. The sample has turquoise-blue secondary minerals including devilline CaCu_{4}(SO_{4})_{2}(OH)_{6}·3H_{2}O, and also lath-shaped, blue-grey to pinkish grey crystals of köttigite with a habit resembling erythrite Co_{3}(AsO_{4})_{2}·8H_{2}O, measuring less than 2 mm. The crystals are relatively rich in iron and cobalt, with traces of copper and nickel.
