= Ojuela =

Human settlement in Mexico

Coordinates: 25.793619°N 103.791358°W

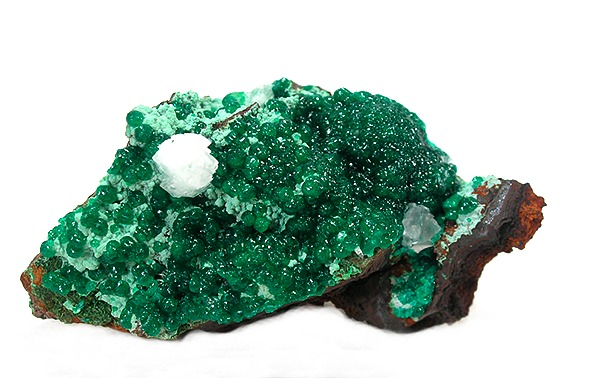
Cuprian Adamite with calcite, Ojuela Mine, size: 5.6 x 3 x 1.8 cm.

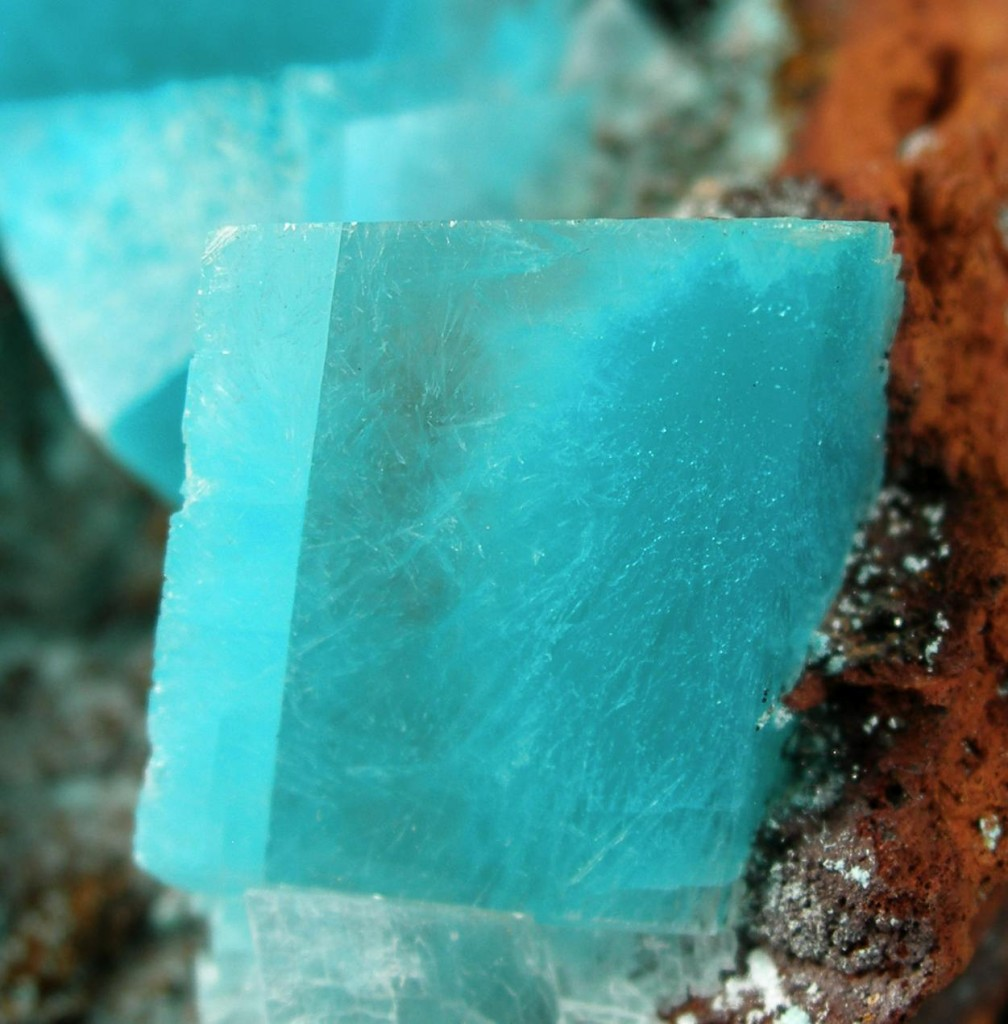
Two rhombs of calcite, to 1.75 cm across, colored green with inclusions of aurichalcite.

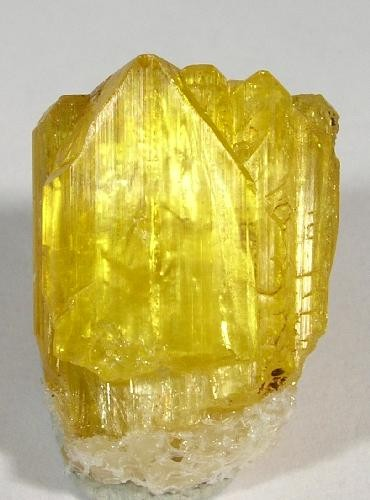
Legrandite from the mine, size: 1.6 x 1.2 x .8 cm.

Ojuela was a small mining settlement located 5 kilometres (3.1 mi) northwest of the nearest town, Mapimí. The settlement is now well-known as a ghost town as a result of the ore being exhausted.

Ojuela was established after the discovery of abandoned gold and silver mines in the area in 1598. The Ojuela Mine produced a large quantity of mineral during the last part of the 19th century. With the advent of the railroad, all the extracted ore were transported away from the mine by train and processed in the nearby town of Mapimí.

The origins of the mine can be traced to 1598 when it was discovered by a group of Spanish prospectors. After this discovery, the mineral potential was confirmed and the exploitation began. Soon the foundations of the town were set. The town was located at the top of a mountain near the mine's main access. This was done in order to have the workers and other mining staff as close as possible to the operation. The town developed rapidly from a small settlement to a village with all the urban services of that age. This included a post office, Catholic church, several warehouses, general stores, and saloons.

At the end of the 19th century, the property was acquired by the Peñoles Mining Company. This was one of the first mining operations of this company. At the beginning of the 20th century, there were problems with the mining exploitation due to the conflicts and struggles originated by the Mexican Revolution and with the additional problem of the water presence inside the mine. At the end of the revolution, the operation continued, but the mineral reserves were soon exhausted, and the company decided to lease it to a local miners cooperative; therefore, the town was gradually abandoned. Now there is no mining activity. However, there are a few fossil, rock, and stone sellers and some tour guides.

Currently the main buildings and other structures are in ruins. It is possible to visit this location and recognize the old church, the foundations of the miners houses, the warehouses, and other mining facilities and to have a guided tour down the access of the former mine. The only surviving and functional structure is a suspension bridge. The bridge is known as "Puente de Ojuela" (Ojuela Bridge) by the locals. The original bridge was designed by the famous Roebling brothers, who also designed the 1866 Roebling Suspension Bridge of Cincinnati and the 1883 Brooklyn Bridge. At the time of construction in 1898, the Puente de Ojuela was the third-longest suspension bridge in the world. It was rebuilt recently by the Peñoles Company; the original was scrapped and only the main arches are now displayed at the Torreón Exposition Center.

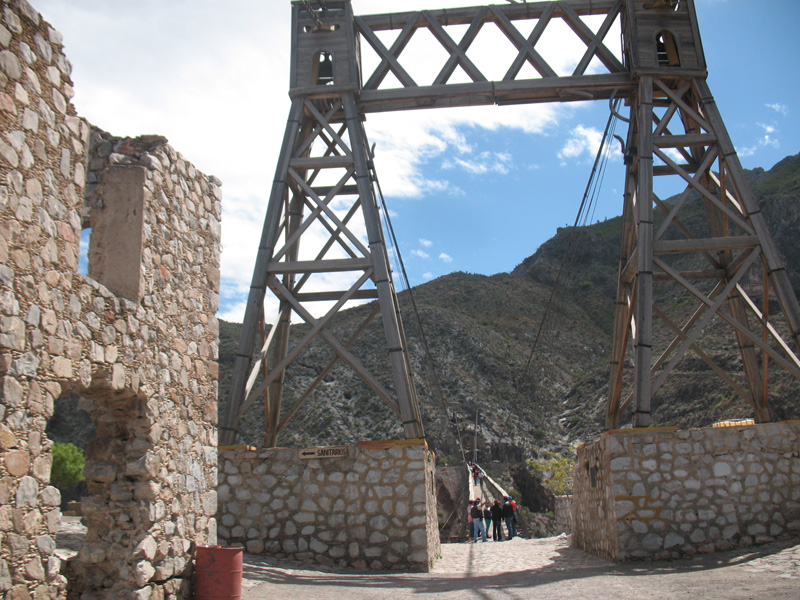
The Ojuela Bridge in Mapimi, Durango, Mexico

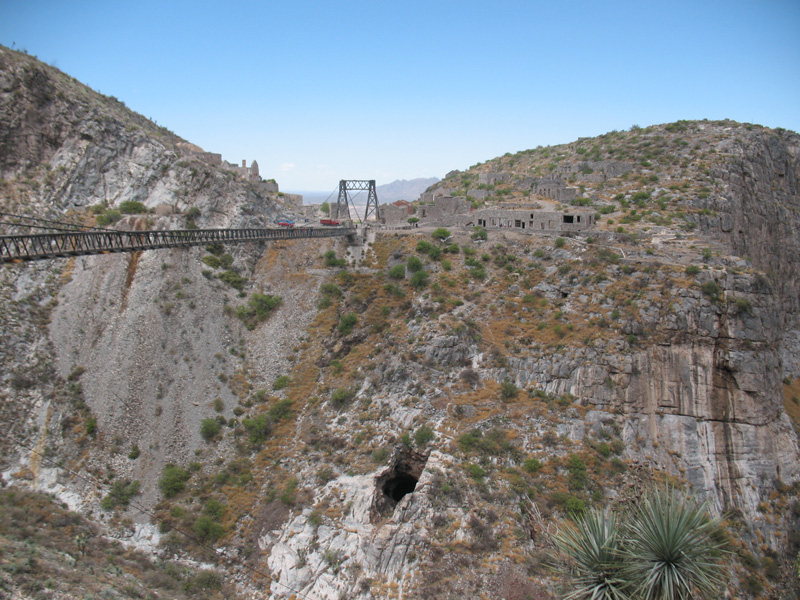
The Ojuela Bridge

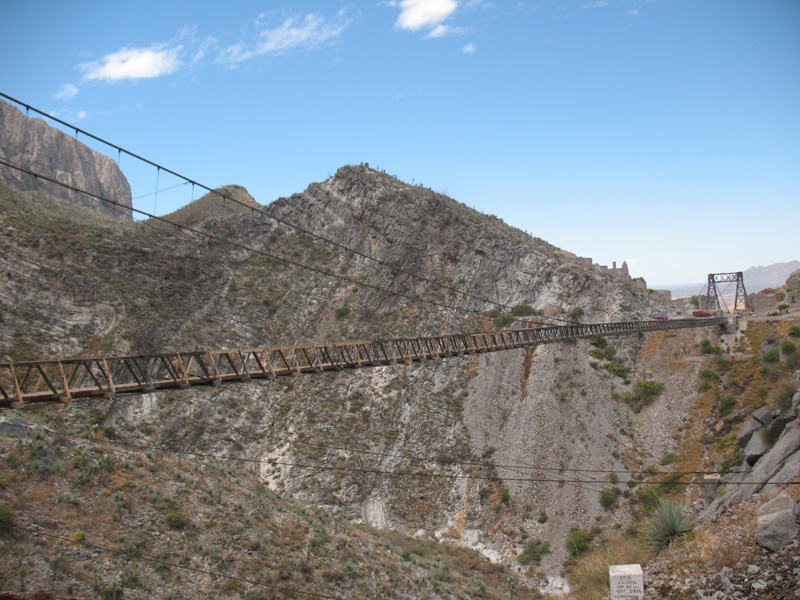
The Ojuela Bridge

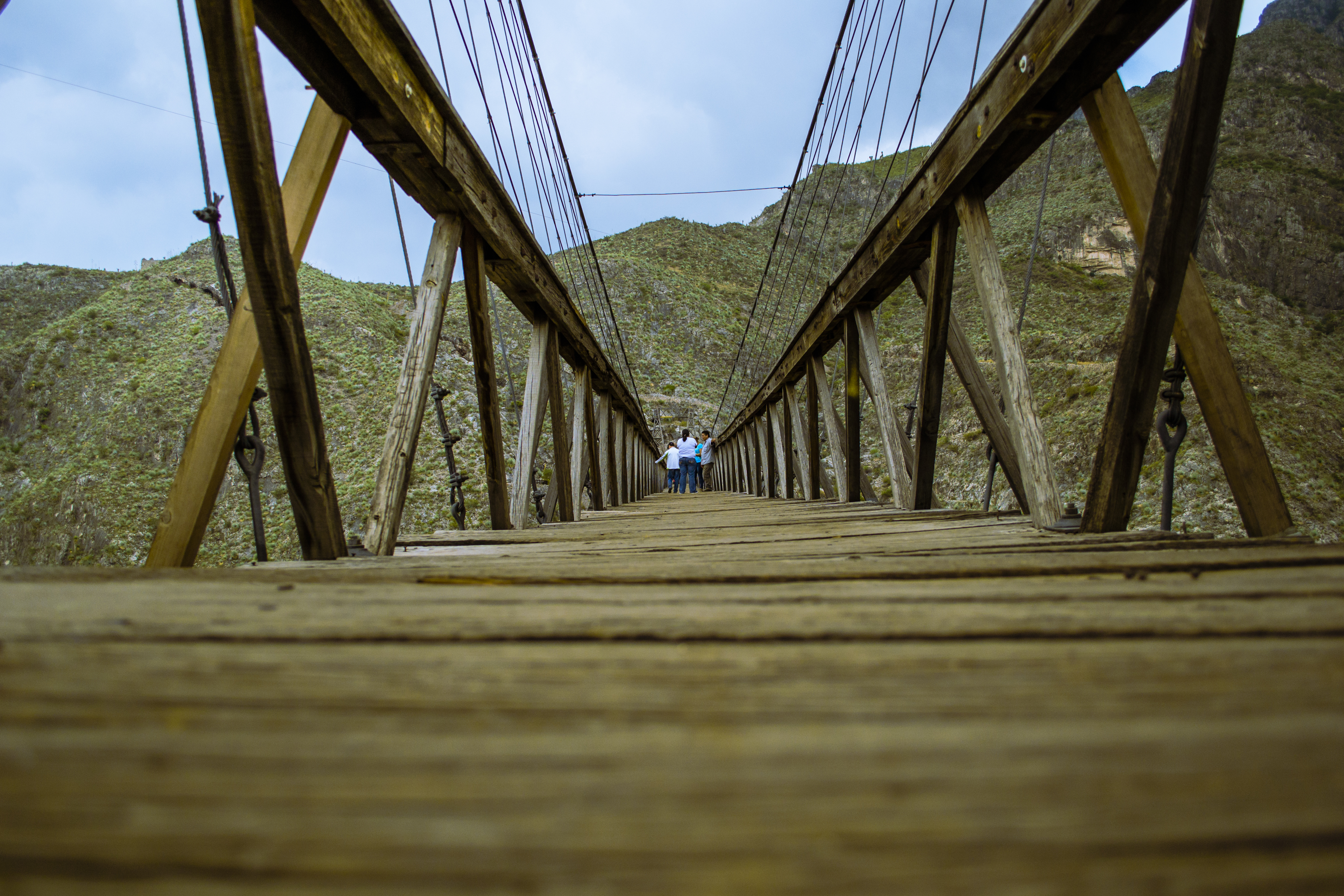
The Ojuela Bridge, low angle

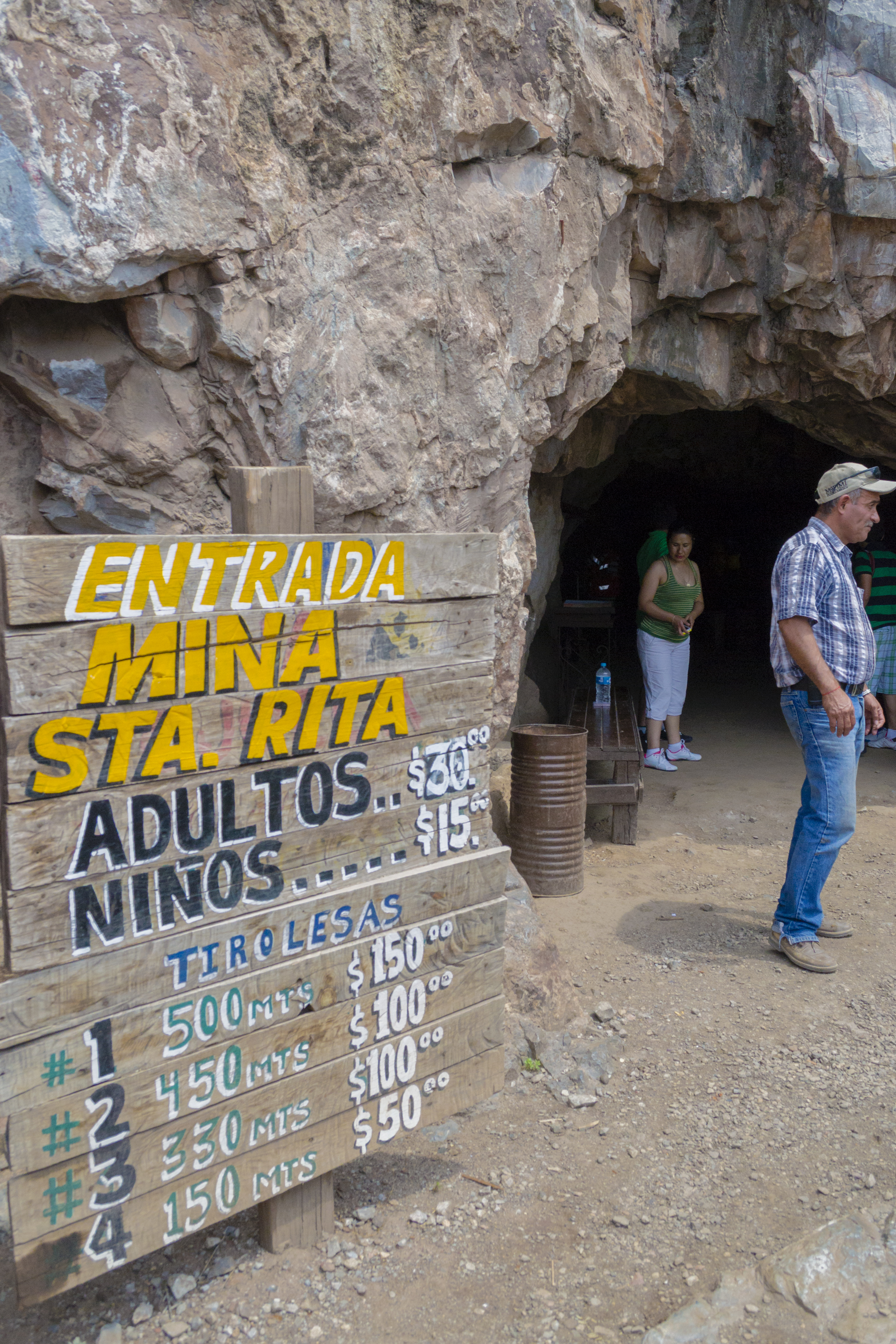
Entrance to the mine

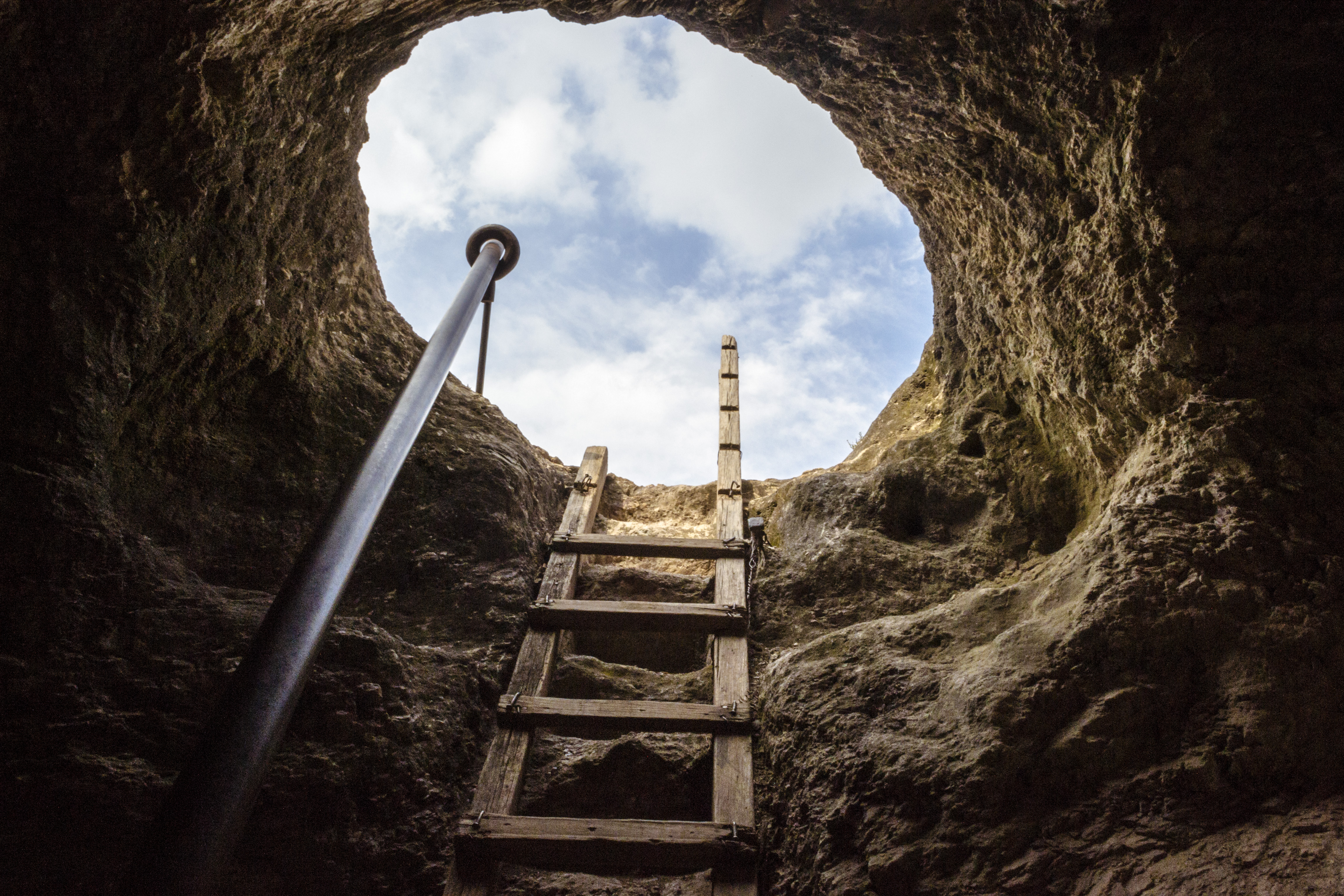
Inside the mine

== Minerals from Ojuela ==
The mine is known among mineral collectors for its arsenate minerals. Ojuela adamite and legrandite have set the standard for these species. The 117 species now known from the deposit include adamite (in an array of colors and habits), legrandite, köttigite/parasymplesite, and paradamite, as well as specimens of scorodite, hemimorphite, plattnerite, aurichalcite, rosasite, fluorite, calcite, wulfenite, mimetite, and other species. It is also the type locality for paradamite, lotharmeyerite, metakottigite, mapimite, and ojuelaite, and the co-type locality for scrutinvite.
