= Legrandite =

Rare zinc arsenate mineral

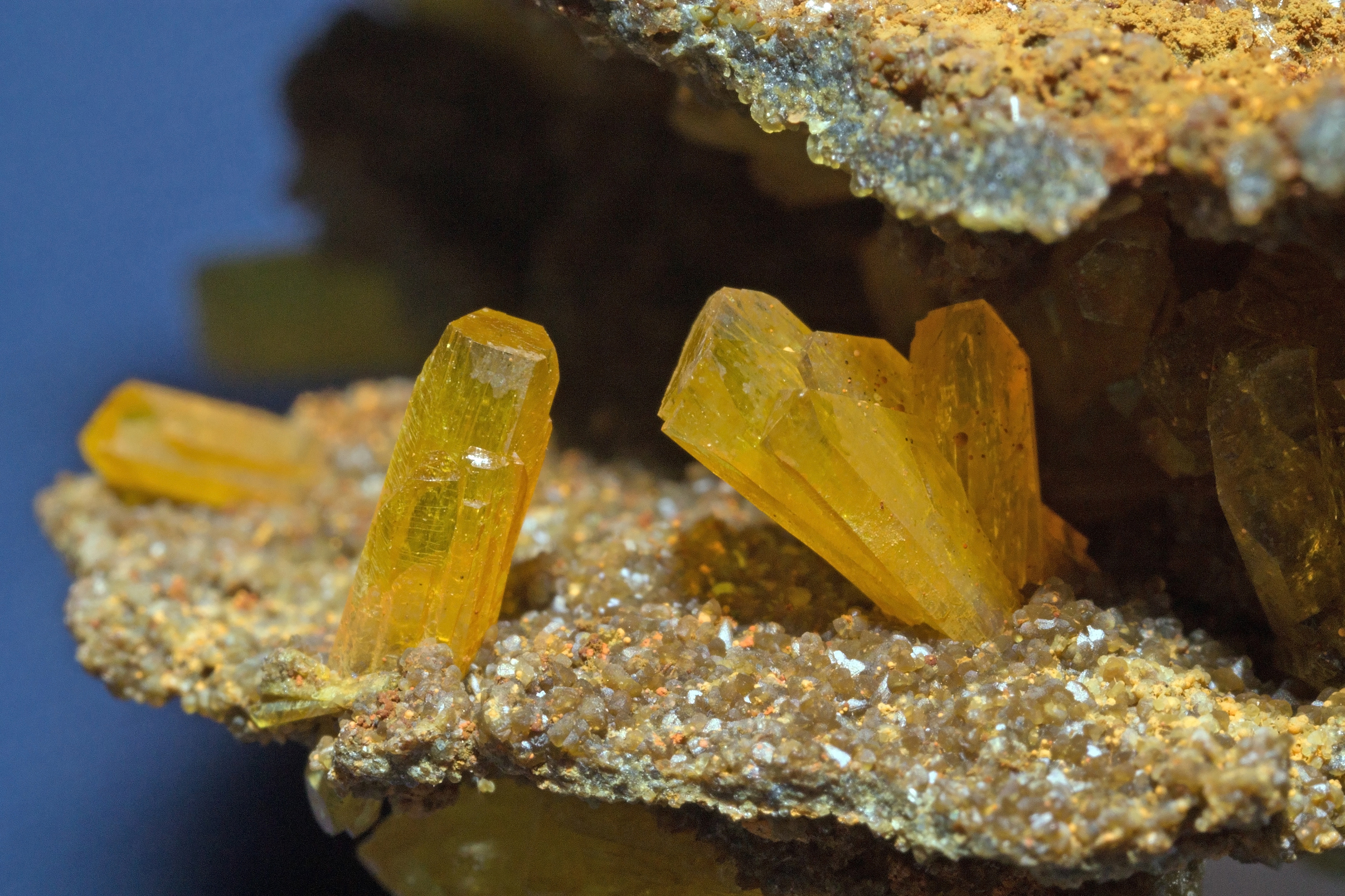

General
- Category: Arsenate minerals
- Formula: Zn_{2}(AsO_{4})(OH)·(H_{2}O)
- IMA symbol: Leg
- Strunz classification: 8.DC.10
- Crystal system: Monoclinic
- Crystal class: Prismatic (2/m) (same H-M symbol)
- Space group: P2_{1}/c
- Unit cell: a = 12.805(2), b = 7.933(1) c = 10.215(2) [Å]; β = 104.23°; Z = 8

Identification
- Color: Bright yellow, wax-yellow, colorless
- Crystal habit: Crystalline, prismatic, typically in sprays or sheaflike aggregates
- Cleavage: Imperfect, poor one {100}
- Fracture: Conchoidal
- Tenacity: Brittle
- Mohs scale hardness: 4.5–5
- Luster: Vitreous
- Streak: White
- Diaphaneity: Transparent to translucent
- Specific gravity: 3.98–4.01
- Optical properties: Biaxial (+)
- Refractive index: n_{α} = 1.675 – 1.702 n_{β} = 1.690 – 1.709 n_{γ} = 1.735 – 1.740
- Birefringence: δ = 0.060
- Pleochroism: X = Y = Colorless to yellow Z = Yellow
- 2V angle: Measured: 50°

Legrandite is a rare zinc arsenate mineral, Zn_{2}(AsO_{4})(OH)·(H_{2}O).

It is an uncommon secondary mineral in the oxidized zone of arsenic bearing zinc deposits and occurs rarely in granite pegmatite. Associated minerals include: adamite, paradamite, köttigite, scorodite, smithsonite, leiteite, renierite, pharmacosiderite, aurichalcite, siderite, goethite and pyrite. It has been reported from Tsumeb, Namibia; the Ojuela mine in Durango, Mexico and at Sterling Hill, New Jersey, US.

It was first described in 1934 for an occurrence in the Flor de Peña Mine, Nuevo León, Mexico and named after Louis C.A. Legrand, a Belgian mining engineer.
