= Ojuela Bridge =

Suspension bridge in Mexico

Coordinates: 25.793619°N 103.791358°W

The Ojuela Bridge or the Mapimi Bridge (Puente de Ojuela, Spanish name) is a suspension bridge located in Mapimí, in the Mexican state of Durango, at the site of the Ojuela Goldmine. The Ojuela Bridge was designed by Wilhelm Hildenbrand and built by the firm of John A. Roebling's Sons Company from New York. Completed in 1898, the bridge was restored as a tourist attraction in 1991. It has a main span of 271.5 metres (891 ft), and the distance between the pylons is 315.5 metres (1,035 ft). Currently, this bridge is only used for pedestrians.

Two plaques were posted on the bridge to commemorate 100 years since its construction. The Ojuela Bridge Plaque reads:

(1892 - 1992)

The Constitutional Governor of Durango: Jose Ramirez Gamero
The President of Mapimi, Durango: Elias Magallanes Campos

It has been a century since this bridge was built.

We pay respect and admiration to the people who worked during those years in this mineral town.

Met-Mex Penoles S.A. DE C.V.

Mapimi, Durango, May 30, 1992.

== Gallery ==
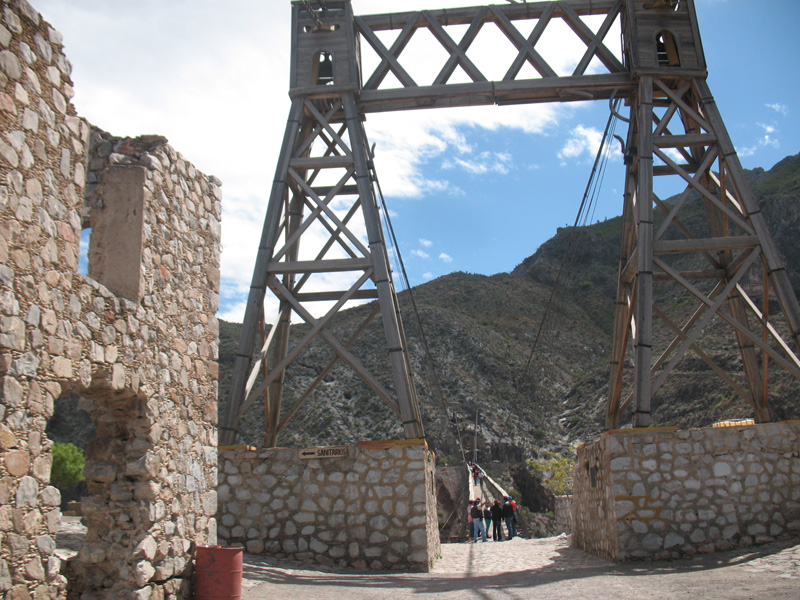
The Ojuela Bridge in Mapimi, Durango, Mexico

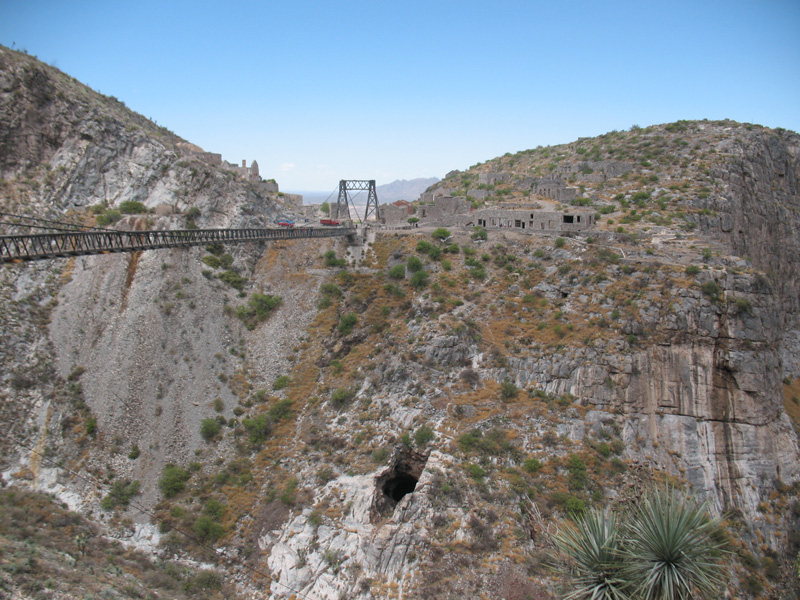
The Ojuela Bridge

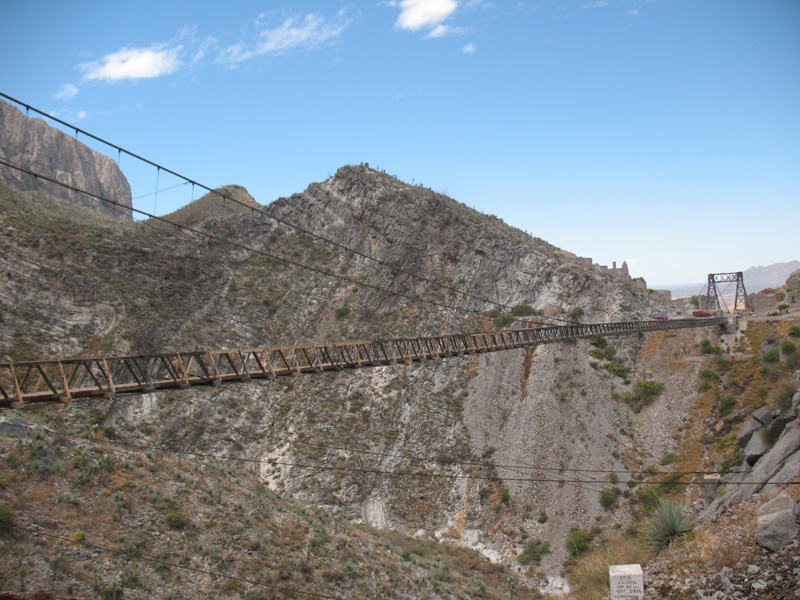
The Ojuela Bridge

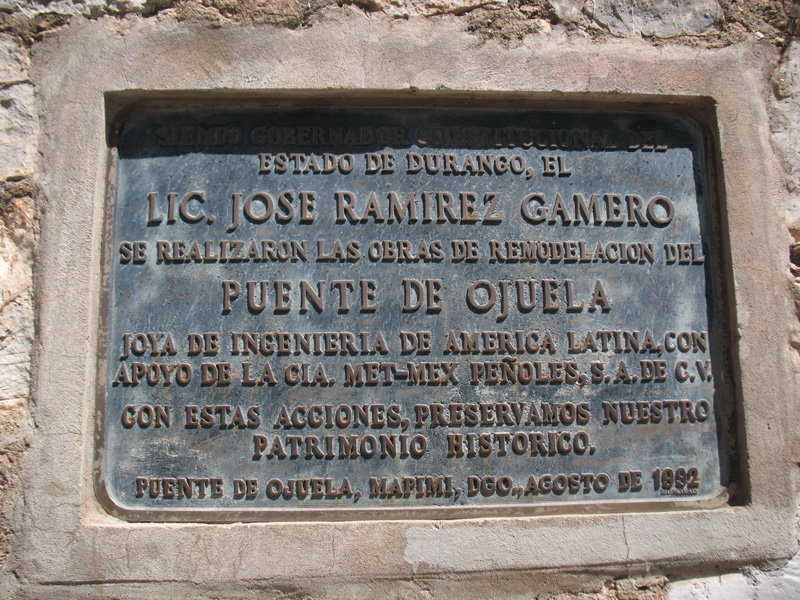
The Ojuela Bridge Plaque

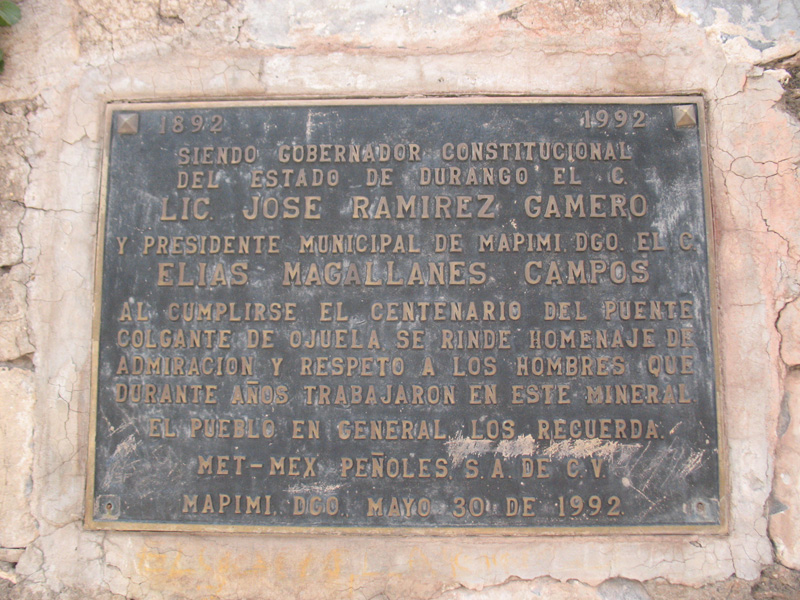
The Ojuela Bridge Plaque

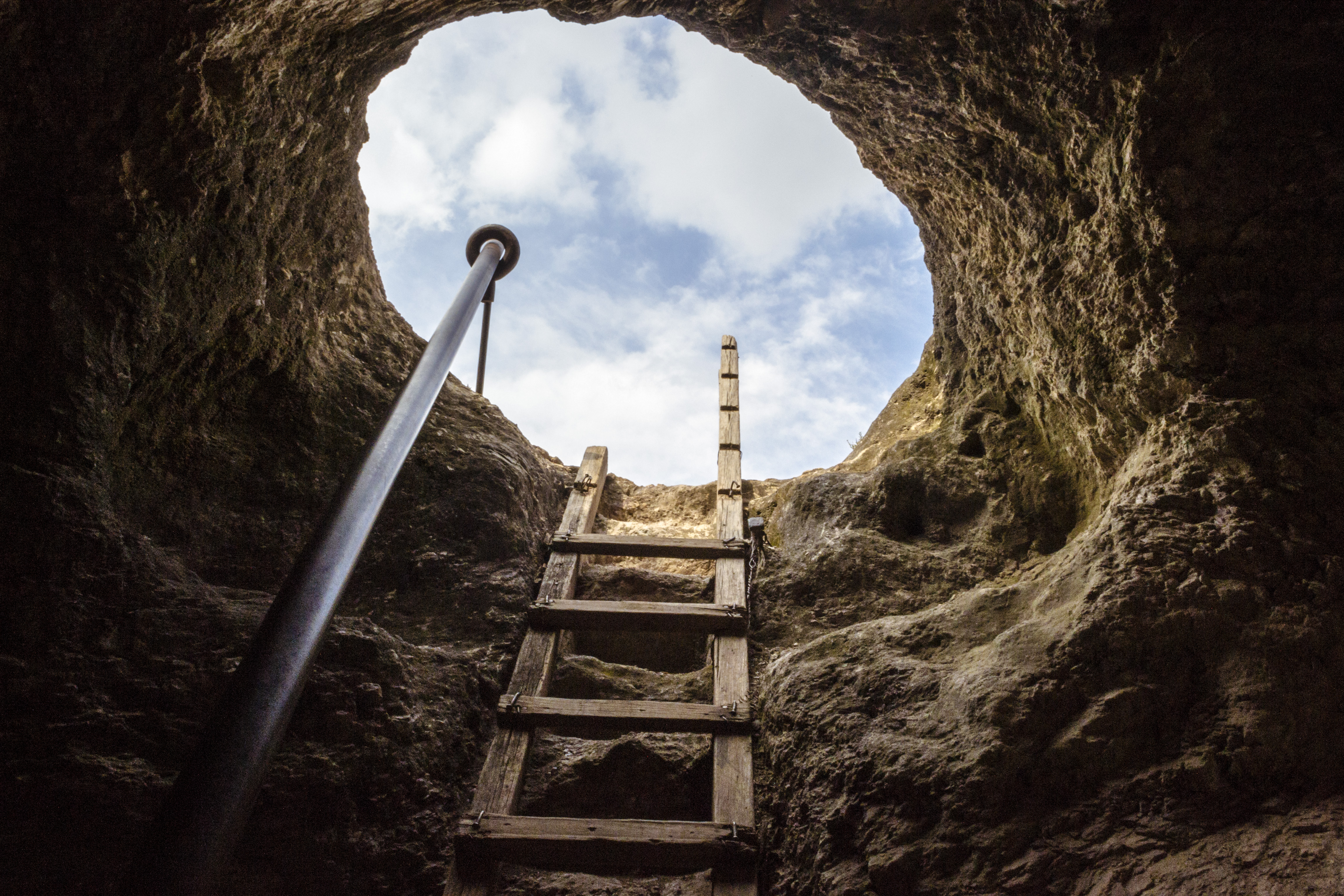
Exterior seen from inside the mine

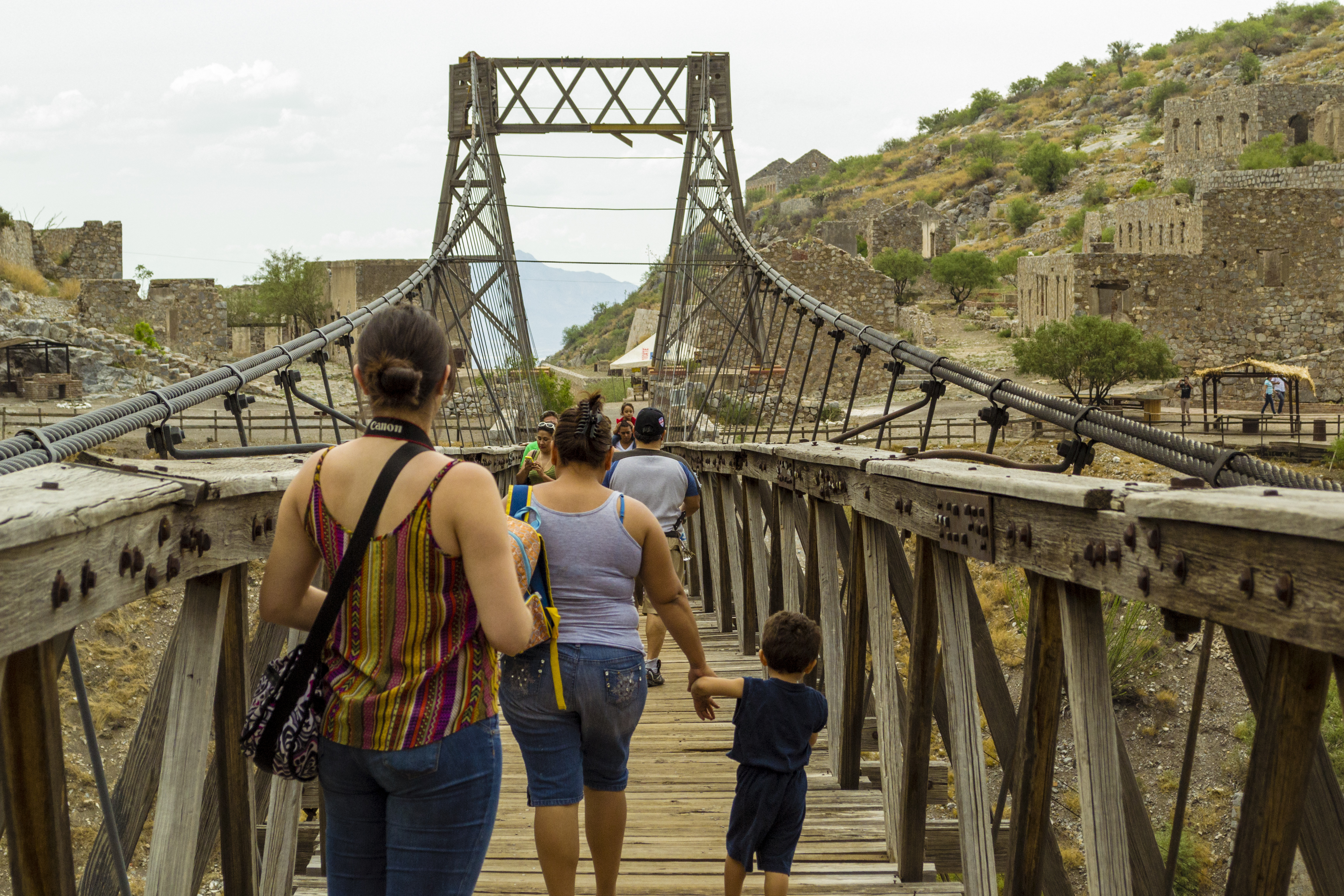
People crossing the bridge
