= Mapimí Silent Zone =

Region in Northwest Mexico

Zone of Silence
- La Zona del Silencio; Triad Vertex
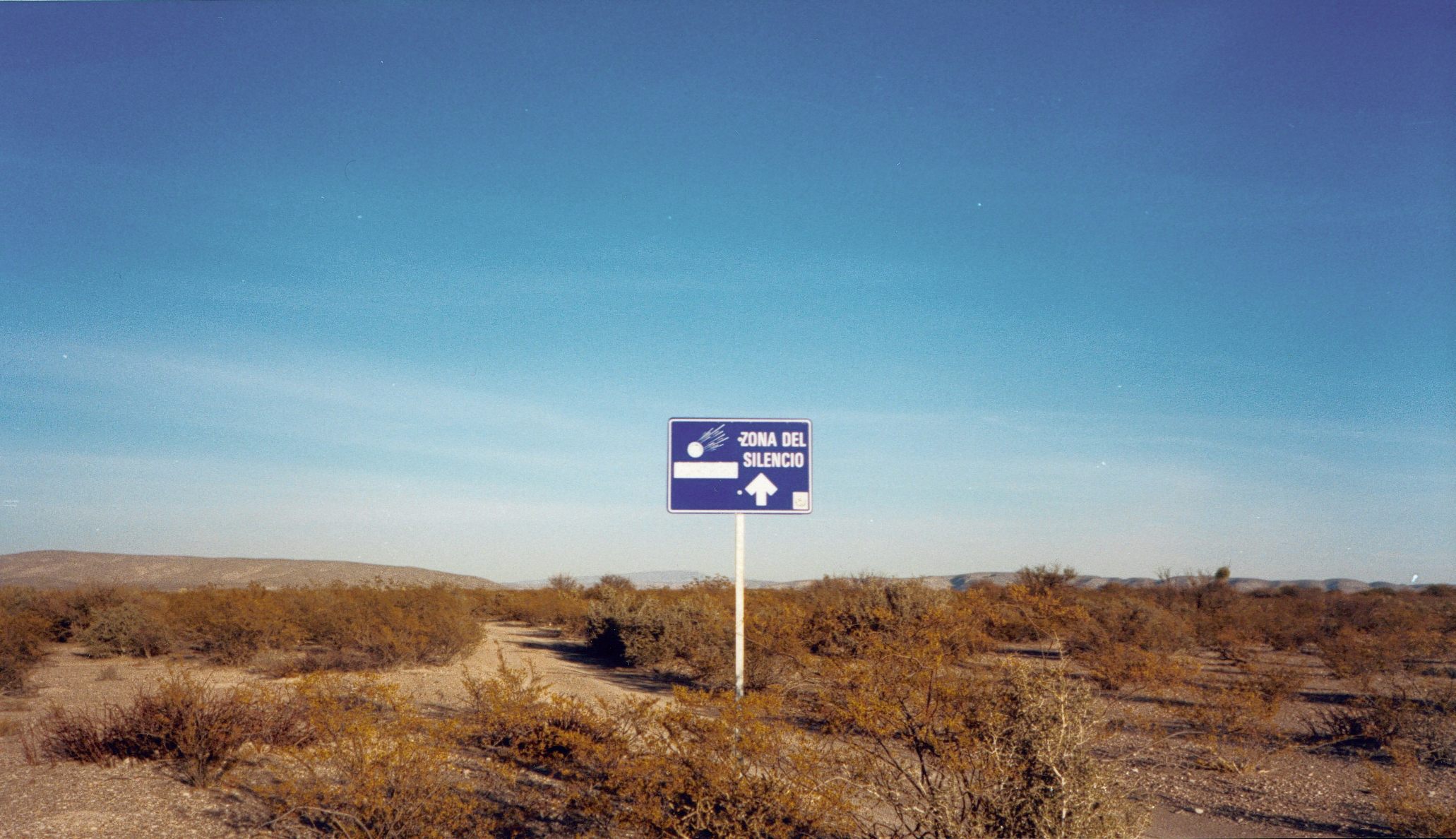
- Interactive map of Zone of Silence
- Location: Mapimí Biosphere Reserve, Mexico
- Coordinates: Maps 26°41′N 103°45′W
- Operator: Municipality of Mapimí

The Mapimí Silent Zone (Spanish: La Zona del Silencio) is the popular name for a desert patch near the Bolsón de Mapimí in Durango, Mexico, overlapping the Mapimí Biosphere Reserve. It is the subject of an urban legend that claims it is an area where radio signals and any type of communications cannot be received.

== History and legends ==
The area was once an ancient seabed in the Tethys Ocean, which left marine fossils and large salt deposits which are mined today.

In July 1970, an Athena RTV test rocket launched from the Green River Launch Complex in Utah towards the White Sands Missile Range in New Mexico lost control and fell in the Mapimí Desert region. When the rocket went off course, it was carrying two small containers of radioactive cobalt 57. As part of the cleanup effort, hundreds of tons of soil were removed from the impact site.

As a result of the US Air Force recovery operation, a number of myths and legends relating to the area arose. Reportedly, a local resident hired to guard the crash debris during recovery operations helped spread these rumors. Legends include "strange magnetic anomalies that prevent radio transmission", mutations of flora and fauna, and extraterrestrial visitations, which have been used by locals to promote tourism in the region.

== See also ==
- Radio quiet zone
- Radio silence
- Skip zone
- United States National Radio Quiet Zone
