= Annabergite =

Arsenate mineral

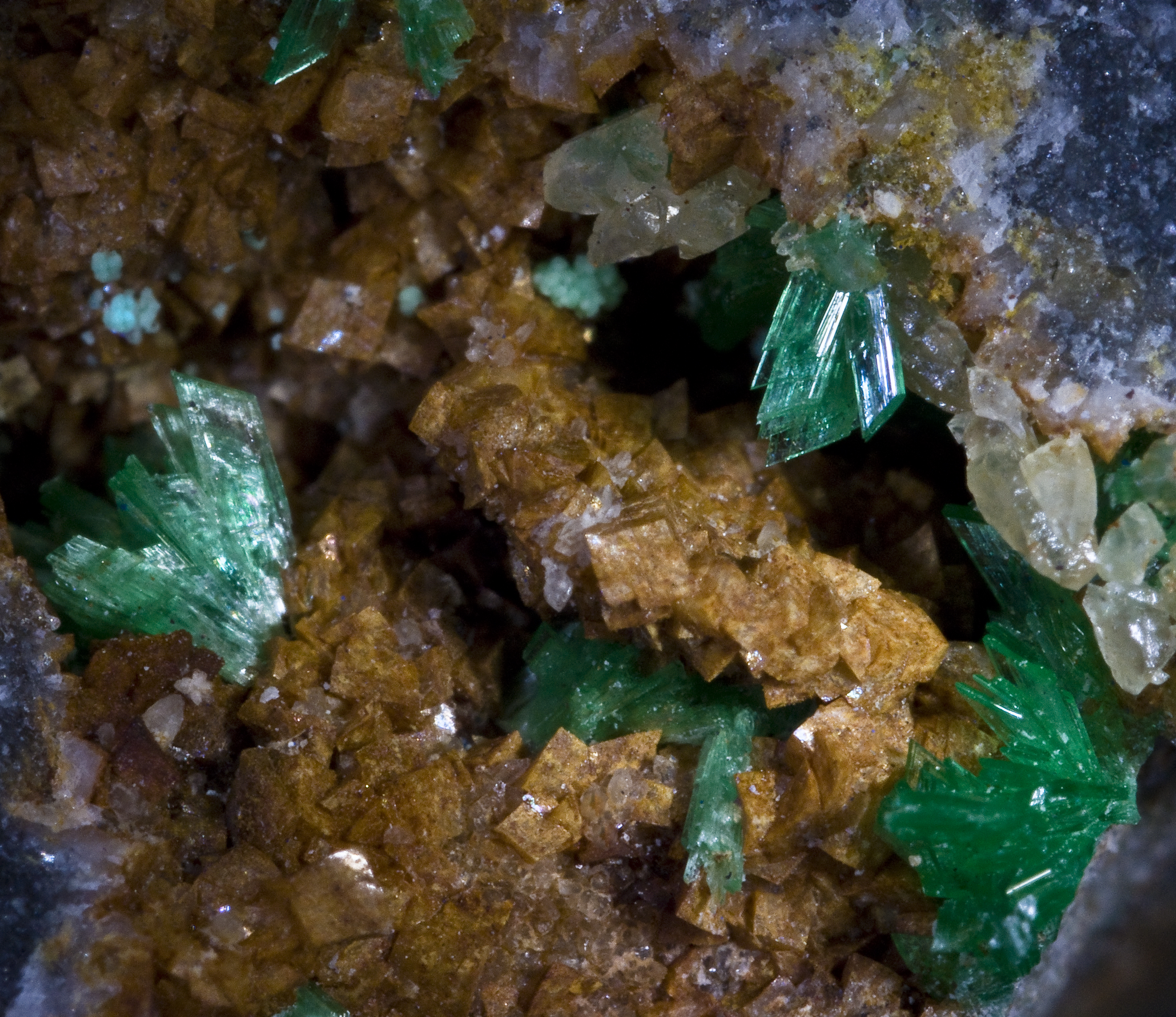
- Annabergite (green) from Lavrion, Greece

General
- Category: Arsenate minerals
- Formula: Ni_{3}(AsO_{4})_{2}·8H_{2}O
- IMA symbol: Anb
- Strunz classification: 8.CE.40
- Crystal system: Monoclinic
- Crystal class: Prismatic (2/m) (same H-M symbol)
- Space group: C2/m
- Unit cell: a = 10.179(2), b = 13.309(3) c = 4.725(1) [Å]; β = 105(1)°; Z = 2

Identification
- Color: Apple-green, pale green, pale rose or pale pink, white, gray; may be zoned
- Crystal habit: Usually as fibrous veinlets, crystalline crusts, or earthy; rare as well formed crystals
- Cleavage: Perfect on {010}, indistinct on {100} and {102}
- Tenacity: Sectile
- Mohs scale hardness: 1.5–2.5
- Luster: Subadamantine, pearly on cleavages, may be dull or earthy
- Streak: Pale green to white
- Diaphaneity: Transparent to translucent
- Specific gravity: 3.07
- Optical properties: Biaxial (−)
- Refractive index: n_{α} = 1.622 n_{β} = 1.658 n_{γ} = 1.687
- Birefringence: δ = 0.065
- 2V angle: Measured: 84°

Annabergite is an arsenate mineral consisting of a hydrous nickel arsenate. It is considered a member of the vivianite group and known for its ability to form crystals in a characteristic apple-green color.

== History ==
Annabergite has been known since the 18th century, although type localities were not published along initial descriptions. The first report of Annabergite by Axel Fredrik Cronstedt from 1758 erroneously identifies it as a nickel oxide mineral and assigned it the latinized name Ochra niccoli, while Wallerius gave it the name nickel bloom in 1778. Annabergite was thoroughly described in 1852 by Brooke and Miller from specimens found in Annaberg in Saxony, which was proposed as namesake for the mineral.

== Properties ==
Annabergite crystallizes in the monoclinic system and is isomorphous with vivianite and erythrite. It most commonly occurs as microcristalline coatings, soft earthy masses and encrustations. Well developed crystals are relatively rare and usually remain minute and capillary. The color of Annabergite varies shades of green. The presence of cobalt modifies the color towards grey, samples high in cobalt showing a rose red color.

== Related minerals ==
Annabergite occurs with ores of nickel and has been found from numerous localities worldwide. The mineral is part of the vivianite group, hydrate bearing phosphate or arsenate minerals. Within that group, several series of minerals have been described, in which the nickel is partially replaced by other ions. The corresponding endpoints are erythrite for cobalt and köttigite for zinc. The series endpoint for the replacement of nickel with magnesium is hörnesite. Minerals on that scale have been designated cabrerite, which only refers to an ordered magnesium-dominated crystal since 2024. Calcium-bearing specimens, known from Creetown in Kirkcudbrightshire, have been called Dudgeonite, named after its discoverer P. Dudgeon.
