= Hörnesite =

Arsenate mineral

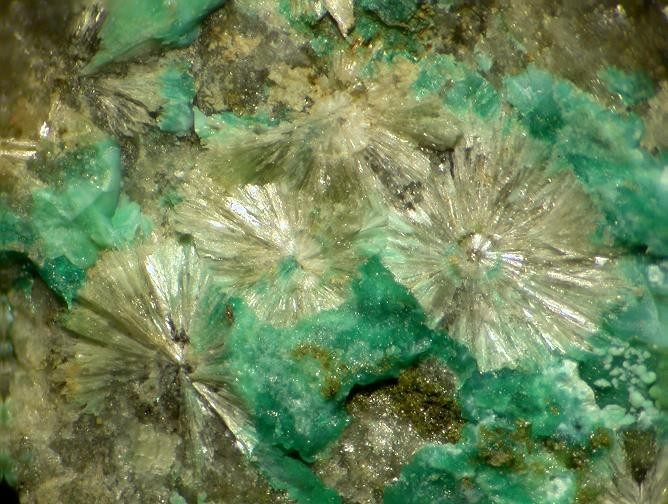

General
- Category: Arsenate minerals
- Formula: Mg_{3}(AsO_{4})_{2}·8H_{2}O
- Strunz classification: 8.CE.40
- Crystal system: Monoclinic
- Crystal class: Prismatic (2/m) (same H-M symbol)
- Space group: C2/m
- Unit cell: a = 10.262, b = 13.442 c = 4.741 [Å]; β = 104.9°; Z = 2

Identification

Hörnesite is an arsenate mineral bearing magnesium. It is a member of the vivianite group of minerals, and constitutes the magnesium endpoint of a mineral series with nickel or cobalt replacing the magnesium, ending in annabergite or erythrite.
