= Mapimí, Durango =

City in the Mexican state of Durango

- City
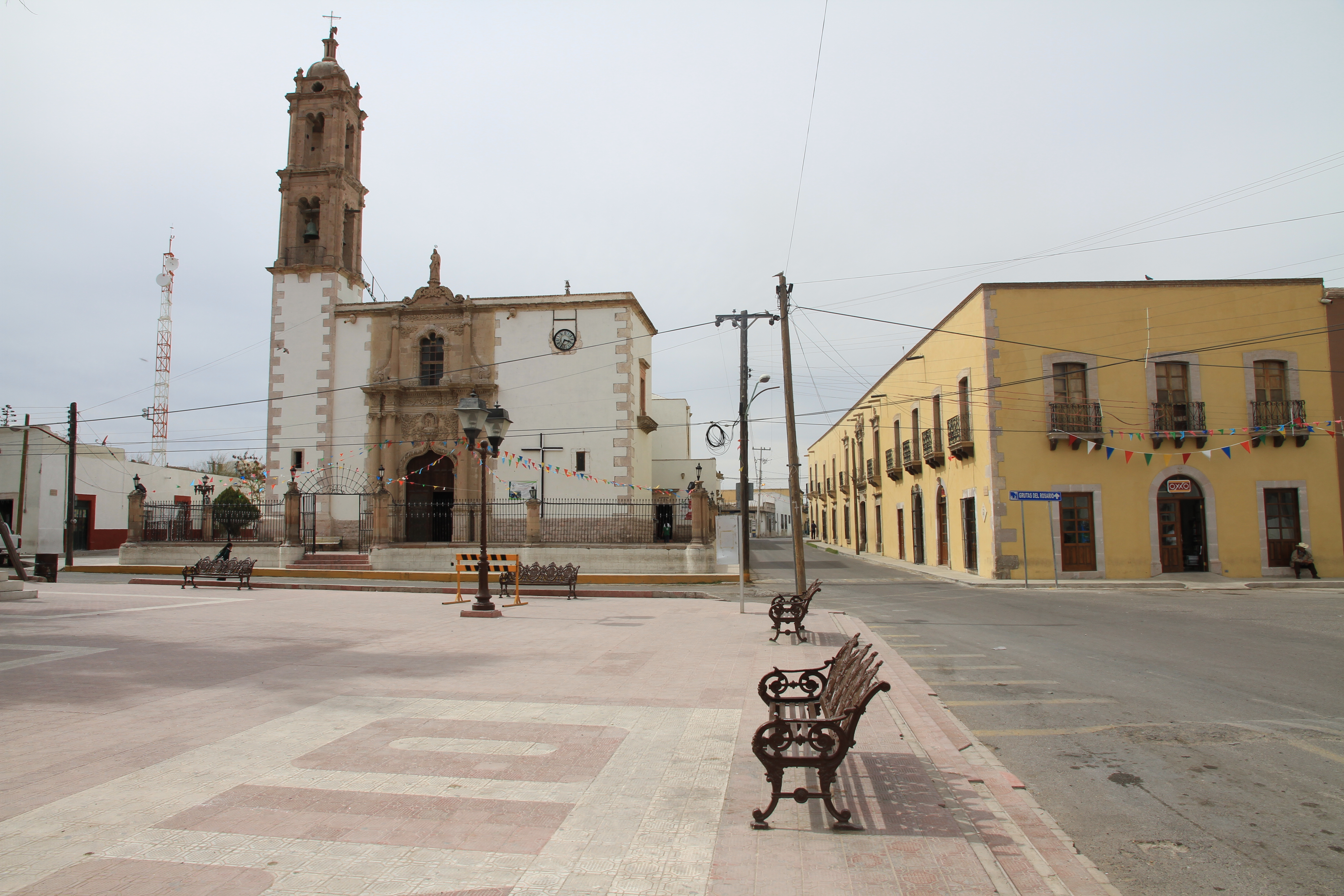
- Plaza de Armas and Church in Mapimí

- Location in Mexico Mapimí, Durango (Mexico)
- Coordinates: 25°49′59″N 103°50′52″W
- Country: Mexico
- State: Durango
- Municipality: Mapimí
- Settled: 25 July 1598
- Elevation: 1,305 m (4,281 ft)

Population (2015)
  - Total: 5,623
- Postal code: 35200
- Area code: 872
- Demonym: Mapimiense
- Website: www.mapimi.gob.mx

Mapimí (Spanish: [mapiˈmi]) is a city and municipal seat of the Mapimí Municipality in the Mexican state of Durango. As of 2015, the town of Mapimí had a population of 5,623. The Ojuela Mine, about 5 kilometres (3.1 mi) southeast of Mapimí, is a famous locality for mineral specimens, especially adamite.

== History ==
When the Spanish first arrived in the Mapimí area in the late 16th century, nomadic and semi-nomadic Native Americans such as the Tepehuan, Tobosos, and Cocoyones were the inhabitants. Mapimi was founded on July 25, 1598 by Agustin de Espinoza, a Jesuit priest, and Captain Antón de Zapata, a soldier. The settlement was named Santiago de Mapimí. The name derives from the Cocoyones who called the area "Mapeme," meaning "high mountain." As with most early settlements in Northern Mexico, the abundant minerals in the area were the attraction for settlers.

The Toboso and other Indian groups began raiding in the Mapimí area and participated in wars against Spanish settlements in 1644, 1667, and 1684. Most of the Indians were absorbed into the Spanish population in the 18th century.

== Geography ==
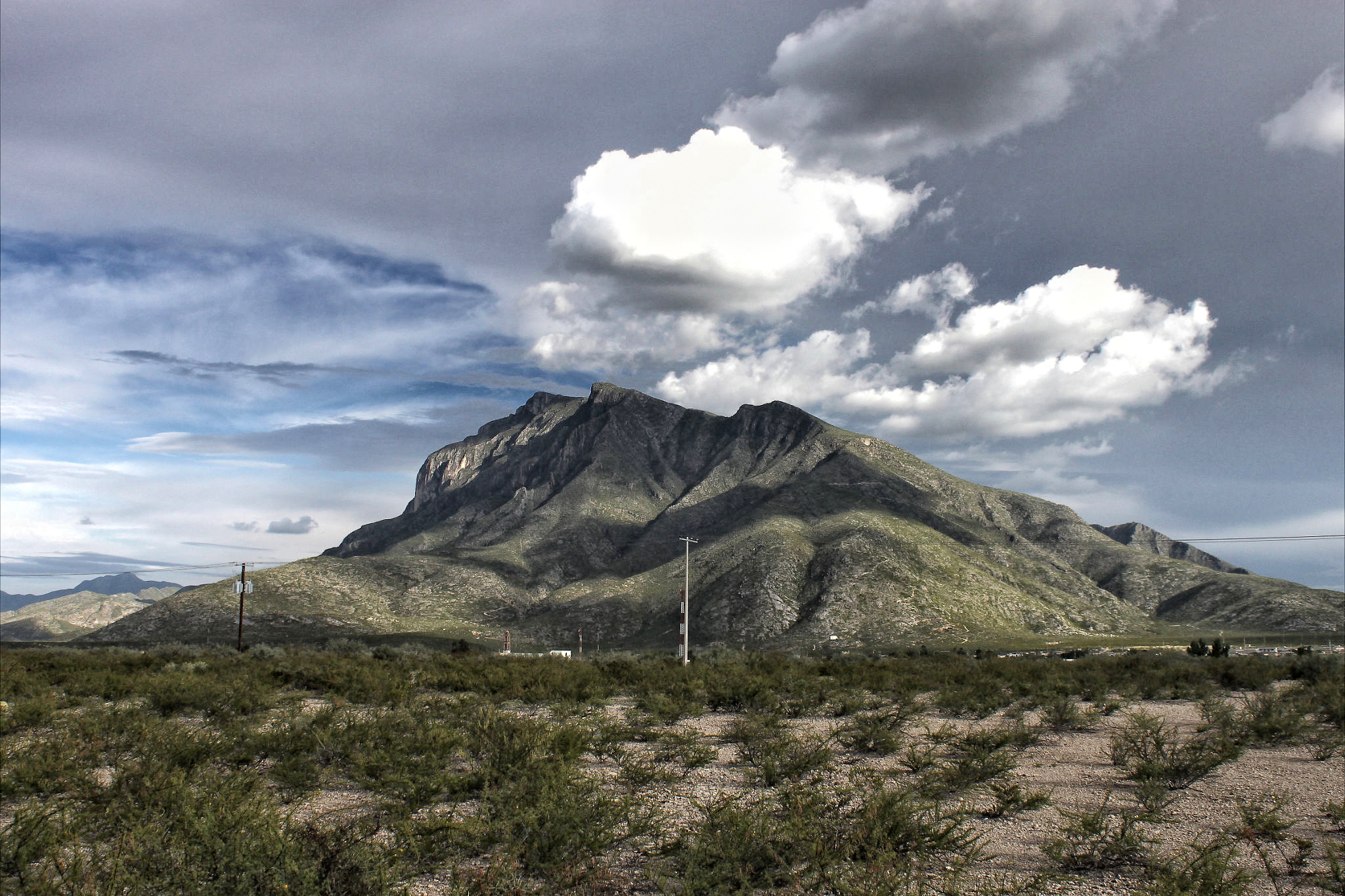
The Sierra de Mapimí, also called the Sierra de la India.

Mapimí is located in the Bolsón de Mapimí, a large area of desert and mountains in interior northern Mexico. The Bolsón is an endorheic basin, meaning that no rivers leave the basin to flow to the sea, but terminate, often in low-lying shallow endorheic lakes. The Mapimí Mountains (Sierra de Mapimí) rise from the southern edge of the town of Mapimí, reaching a maximum elevation of 2,479 metres (8,133 ft), 6.5 kilometres (4.0 mi) southeast of the town. The Ojuela mine and the Ojuela Bridge, a high and long suspension bridge are located 5 kilometres (3.1 mi) distant on the eastern slopes of the mountains. The Mapimí Silent Zone is 100 kilometres (62 mi) north in the Mapimí Biosphere Reserve.

=== Climate ===
The town features a desert climate (in the Köppen climate classification BWh), with hot summers and mild winters. Nearly all the annual precipitation is received from the months of May to October.

Climate data for Mapimí (1991–2020)
Month	Jan	Feb	Mar	Apr	May	Jun	Jul	Aug	Sep	Oct	Nov	Dec	Year
Record high °C (°F)	36.0 (96.8)	39.0 (102.2)	44.0 (111.2)	42.0 (107.6)	44.0 (111.2)	44.0 (111.2)	44.0 (111.2)	41.0 (105.8)	39.0 (102.2)	39.0 (102.2)	36.0 (96.8)	36.0 (96.8)	44.0 (111.2)
Mean daily maximum °C (°F)	20.7 (69.3)	23.9 (75.0)	27.8 (82.0)	32.3 (90.1)	35.3 (95.5)	35.8 (96.4)	34.8 (94.6)	34.1 (93.4)	31.1 (88.0)	28.2 (82.8)	23.9 (75.0)	20.3 (68.5)	29.0 (84.2)
Daily mean °C (°F)	11.9 (53.4)	14.7 (58.5)	18.6 (65.5)	22.5 (72.5)	26.0 (78.8)	27.0 (80.6)	26.6 (79.9)	26.2 (79.2)	23.5 (74.3)	20.0 (68.0)	15.7 (60.3)	11.9 (53.4)	20.4 (68.7)
Mean daily minimum °C (°F)	3.1 (37.6)	5.5 (41.9)	9.4 (48.9)	12.8 (55.0)	16.7 (62.1)	18.3 (64.9)	18.5 (65.3)	18.2 (64.8)	16 (61)	11.8 (53.2)	7.5 (45.5)	3.6 (38.5)	11.8 (53.2)
Record low °C (°F)	−10.0 (14.0)	−14.0 (6.8)	−5.0 (23.0)	−2.0 (28.4)	2.0 (35.6)	3.0 (37.4)	5.0 (41.0)	1.3 (34.3)	3.0 (37.4)	−1.0 (30.2)	−8.0 (17.6)	−10.0 (14.0)	−14.0 (6.8)
Average precipitation mm (inches)	7.4 (0.29)	2.4 (0.09)	7.3 (0.29)	4.1 (0.16)	10.2 (0.40)	41.8 (1.65)	68.0 (2.68)	69.3 (2.73)	77.6 (3.06)	18.5 (0.73)	8.2 (0.32)	4.9 (0.19)	319.7 (12.59)
Average precipitation days (≥ 0.1 mm)	1.8	0.7	0.9	1.1	2.3	4.2	6.2	5.7	5.8	2.2	1.7	1.1	33.7
Source: Servicio Meteorologico Nacional

== See also ==
- Mapimí Silent Zone, an alleged area of radio silence located in the region.
