= Bolsón de Mapimí =

Basin in the center-north of the Mexican Plateau

Coordinates: 25.8°N 103.8°W

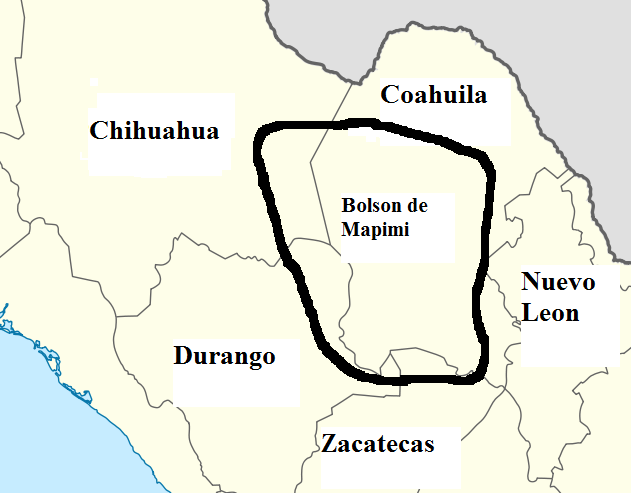
A map showing the location of the Bolson de Mapimi in northern Mexico

The Bolsón de Mapimí is an endorheic, or internal drainage, basin in which no rivers or streams drain to the sea, but rather toward the center of the basin, often terminating in swamps and ephemeral lakes. It is located in the center-north of the Mexican Plateau. The basin is shared by the states of Durango, Coahuila, Chihuahua, and Zacatecas. It takes its name from Mapimí, a town in Durango.

The largest city in the basin is Torreón. Parts of the basin host much industrial and agricultural activity. However, most of the region is sparsely populated.

== Geography ==
The Bolsón de Mapimí is a large area, measuring more than 320 kilometres (200 mi) north to south and the same distance east to west, lying between 25 and 29 degrees north latitude. The total area is about 129,000 square kilometres (50,000 sq mi) and the average elevation is 900 metres (3,000 ft). The Greater Bolsón de Mapimí covers adjacent areas extending north to the Rio Grande, which are similar in terrain and climate but have streams which have outlets to the Gulf of Mexico.

The Bolsón is bounded on the west by the Sierra Madre Occidental and the Conchos River basin, by the basin of the Rio Grande to the north, and by the mountain ranges of the Sierra del Carmen and Sierra Madre Oriental to the east. At its southern edge, near the state line of Zacatecas, the Bolson shades into another endorheic basin called Llanos El Salado. Major rivers flowing northward into the basin are the Nazas River and its tributaries, which originate in the Sierra Madre Occidental in Durango, and the Aguanaval River, which flows north from central Zacatecas. The two rivers terminate in the southern part of the Bolsón in an area called the Comarca Lagunera, centered on the city of Torreón, Coahuila, which formerly contained large, shallow lakes, now usually dry.

The Bolsón de Mapimí consists of desert plains separated by low mountain ranges. Cerro Centinela, which rises to (3,130 metres (10,270 ft), south of Torreón is at the southern edge. Within the Bolsón most of the mountain ranges are 1,200–1,500 metres (3,900–4,900 ft) in elevation. Los Alamitos range near the center of the Bolsón reaches 1,984 metres (6,509 ft)

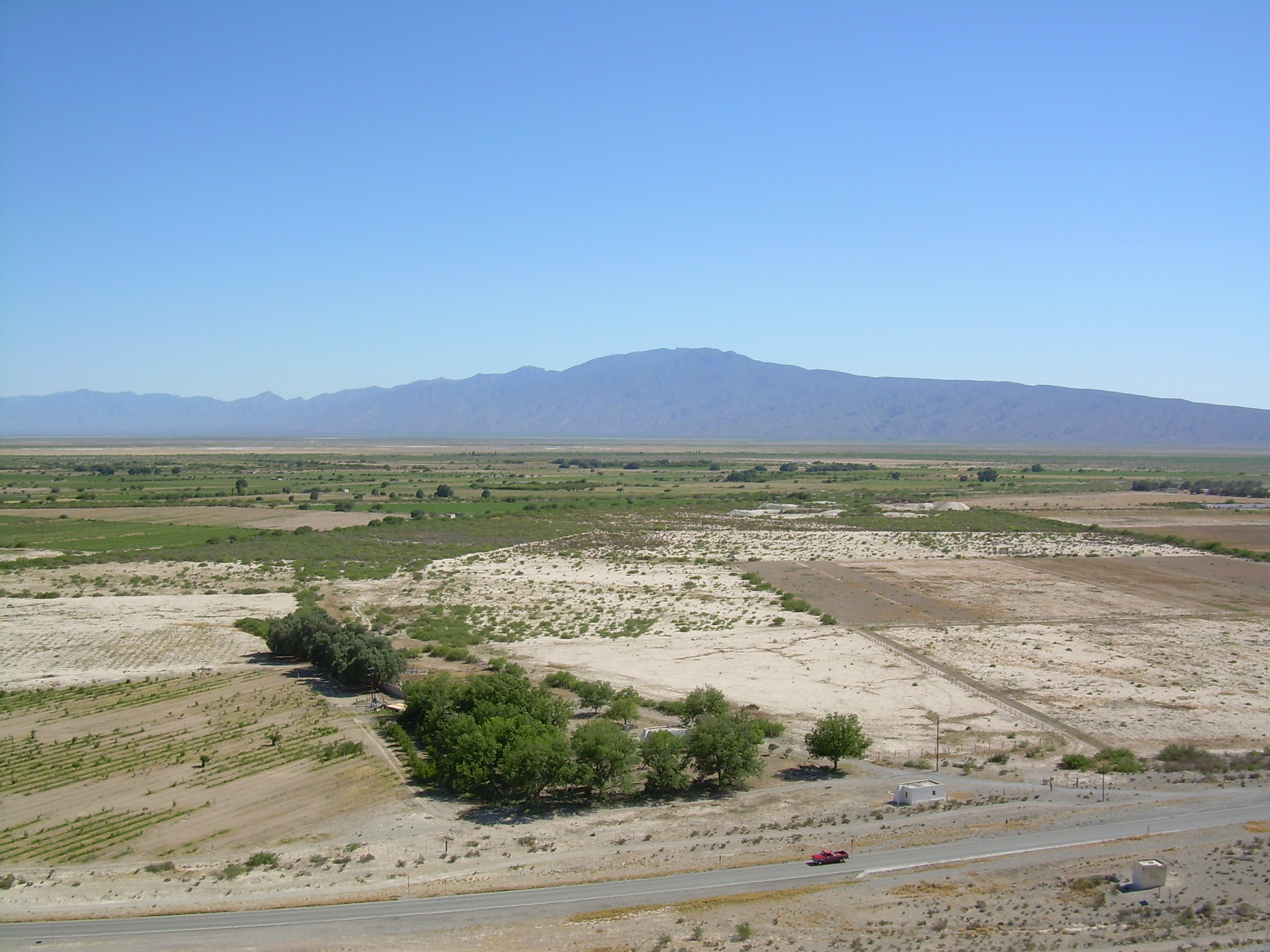
Abundant water permits irrigated agriculture in the Cuatro Ciénegas valley.

The Bolsón is the southernmost extension of the Chihuahua Desert. The area receives between 200 and 400 mm (7.9 and 15.7 in) of precipitation annually, mostly falling in summer. The city of Torreón receives 228 mm (9.0 in). Summer temperatures are hot. June is the hottest month in Torreón with an average temperature of 28.1 °C (82.6 °F). Winters are mild with an average temperature of 14.5 °C (58.1 °F) in December in Torreón. Freezes are common in winter.

The largest conurbation in the basin is the Comarca Lagunera, with nearly 1.5 million inhabitants, roughly half of whom live in the city of Torreón. Most of the Bolsón is sparsely populated, with settlements centered on mines and areas where irrigated agriculture is possible.

== History ==
Prior to the arrival of the Spanish the Bolsón de Mapimí was inhabited by nomadic hunter-gatherers. Bands of the Toboso people, of whom little is known, inhabited most of the Bolsón. In the north lived the Chisos who had a similar culture. Spanish penetration into the Bolson began in the 1590s with Jesuit missionaries, slave traders, and Tlaxcalan Indians whom the Spanish persuaded by grants of land and freedom from taxes to move north to aid in assimilating the Indians and resolving the long-running Chichimeca War. The Toboso and Chisos began raiding Spanish settlements at an early date and participated in wars against Spanish settlements in 1644, 1667, and 1684. Most of the Toboso and Chisos were absorbed into the Spanish population in the early 18th century.

In the 19th century the Bolsón was still largely unpopulated. In the 1840s and 1850s the Bolsón became a base for Comanches from Texas who met at well-watered locations, consolidated their forces, often numbering hundreds of warriors, and struck off in every direction on destructive raids of mines and ranches. (See Comanche-Mexico War) From the 1840s to the 1860s much of the Bolsón was a ranch owned by the Sánchez Navarro family, possibly the largest land-owners in the Americas.

== See also ==
- Mapimí Biosphere Reserve
- Mapimí Silent Zone
- Meseta Central matorral
