= Mapimí Municipality =

Municipality in the Mexican state of Durango

Mapimí
- Municipality
- Municipality of Mapimí in Durango

- Location in Mexico
- Coordinates: 26°14′6″N 104°29′14″W
- Country: Mexico
- State: Durango
- Municipal seat: Mapimí

Area
  - Total: 7,126.7 km^{2} (2,751.6 sq mi)

Population (2010)
  - Total: 25,137
  - Density: 3.5272/km^{2} (9.1353/sq mi)
- Time zone: UTC-6 (Zona Centro)
- Website: www.mapimi.gob.mx

Mapimí is a municipality in the Mexican state of Durango. The municipal seat lies at Mapimí. The municipality covers an area of 7,126.7 km^{2}.

In 2010, the municipality had a total population of 25,137, up from 22,940 in 2005.

In 2010, the town of Mapimí had a population of 5,623. Other than the town of Mapimí, the municipality had 283 localities, the largest of which (with 2010 populations in parentheses) were: Bermejillo (9,149) and Ceballos (3,730), classified as urban.

Located in the northeastern portion of the state, it borders the municipalities of Lerdo, Gómez Palacio, Tlahualilo, Villa Hidalgo, San Pedro del Gallo, San Luis del Cordero and Nazas.

== See also ==
- Ojuela Mine

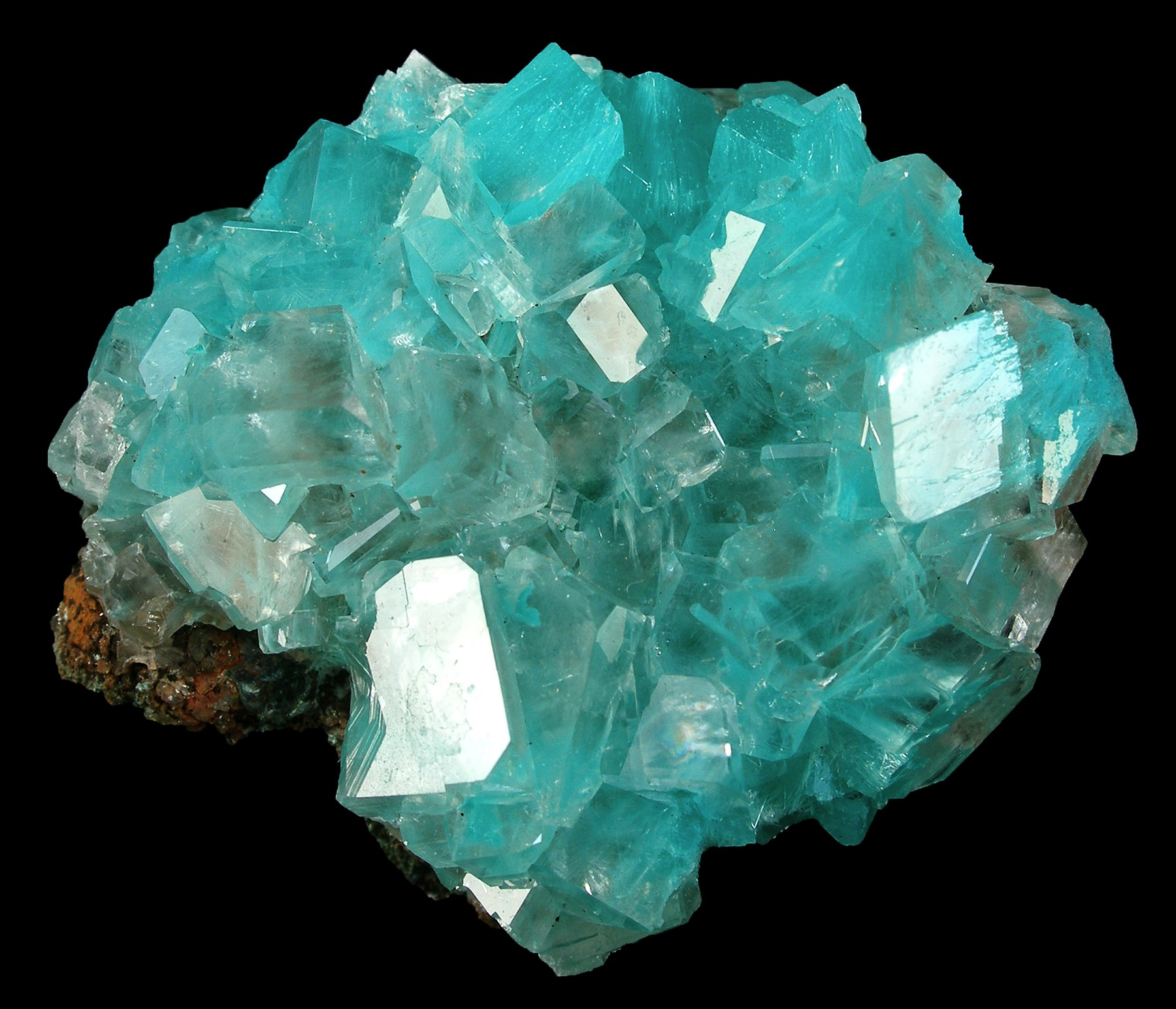
Glassy calcite rhombs with inclusions of fibrous aurichalcite, Ojuela Mine. Size: 4.7 x 4.1 x 2.3 cm.
