= Mapimí Biosphere Reserve =

Biosphere reserve in Durango, Mexico

- Reserva de la Biósfera de Mapimí
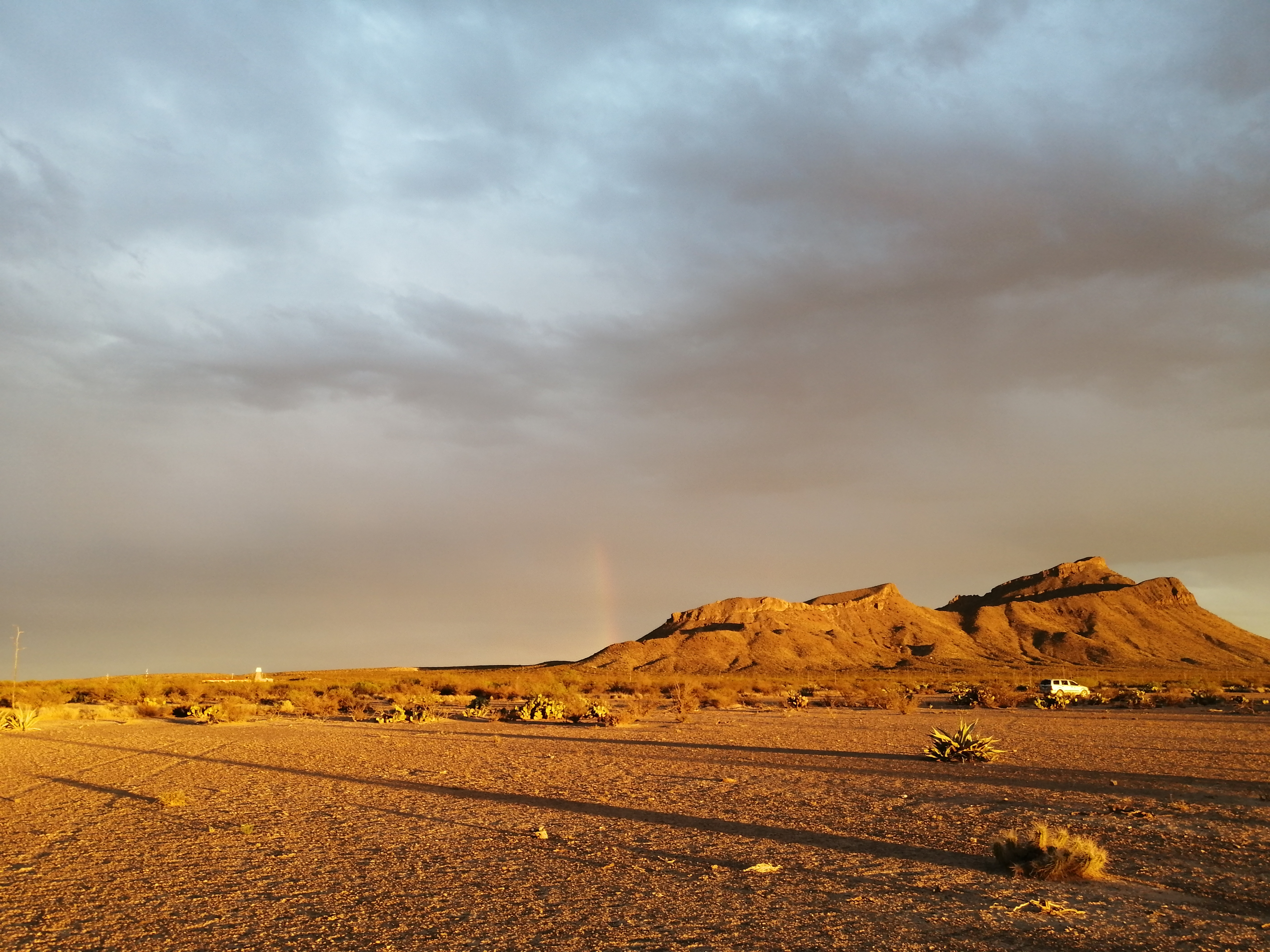
- A panaroma of the Mapimí biosphere, Mexico

- Location within Mexico
- Location: Durango, Mexico
- Coordinates: 26°24′36″N 103°26′24″W
- Area: 342,388 hectares (1,321.97 sq mi)
- Established: 1977
- Governing body: National Commission of Natural Protected Areas

The Mapimí Biosphere Reserve (Spanish: Reserva de la Biósfera de Mapimí) (established 1977) is a UNESCO Biosphere Reserve located in the state of Durango in northern Mexico. It is one of three biosphere reserves representing the Chihuahuan Desert (along with Big Bend Biosphere Reserve and National Park in western Texas and Jornada Biosphere Reserve in New Mexico). The 342,388 hectares (1,321.97 sq mi) reserve is situated between the Neotropical and Nearctic biogeographic realms, in the Bolsón de Mapimí 1,150 metres (3,770 ft) above sea level. It contains three core areas in the Sierra de la Campana, the Laguna de las Palomas, a salt lagoon, and a desert habitat called Dunas de la Soledad. It comprises fragile warm desert and semi-desert ecosystems and rich, highly adapted but vulnerable plant systems, mainly xerophytic matorral scrub, and animal species such as the puma (Puma concolor), mule deer (Odocoileus hemionus), sandhill crane (Grus canadensis) and the kit fox or zorrita del desiert (Vulpes macrotis) along with scrub and desert grasslands.

The site is administered by the municipalities of Tlahualillo and Mapimí in Durango, Jiménez in Chihuahua and Sierra Mojada in Coahuila.

== Ecological characteristics ==
This biosphere reserve includes the desert ecosystems of the central part of the Chihuahua Desert, where there is a predomination of xerophytic scrubland and chaparral with various compositions forming mosaics of halophyte vegetation in the lower parts.

Biologically rich, it includes 403 plant species. Noteworthy are the 39 cactus species and 200 species of birds, 5 species of amphibians, 36 species of reptiles and 28 species of mammals. Endemic species identified are nine for the family Cactaceae, one for the family Cochlospermaceae and one for the family Fouqueriaceae. Particularly charismatic are the Bolson tortoise (Gopherus flavomarginatus), the kit fox (Vulpes macrotis), the Mexican fringe-toed lizard (Uma paraphigas), the mule deer (Odocoileus hemionus), the American badger (Taxidea taxus), the puma (Puma concolor); and birds such as the golden eagle (Aquila crhysaetos).

== Human activities ==
As of 1997, 72,600 inhabitants live in the reserve, mainly engaged in extensive cattle raising, salt exploitation and agriculture.

== Flora and fauna ==
According to the National Biodiversity Information System of Comisión Nacional para el Conocimiento y Uso de la Biodiversidad (CONABIO) in Mapimí Biosphere Reserve there are over 815 plant and animal species from which 44 are in at risk category and 25 are exotics.

== Sources ==
This article incorporates text from a free content work (license statement/permission). Text taken from UNESCO - MAB Biosphere Reserves Directory, UNESCO, UNESCO.
