= Adamite =

Zinc arsenate hydroxide mineral

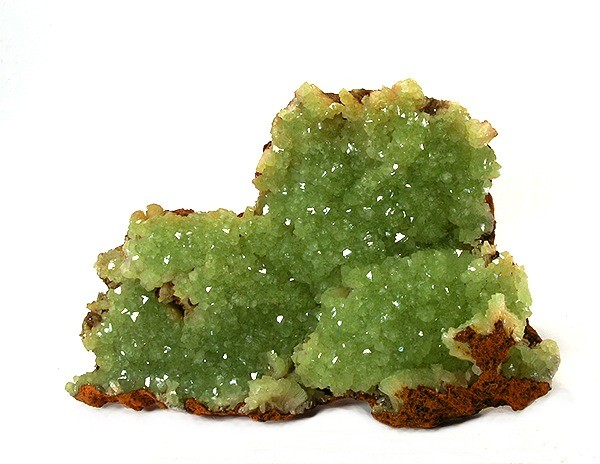
- Yellow-green adamite in limonite

General
- Category: Arsenate mineral
- Formula: Zn_{2}AsO_{4}OH
- IMA symbol: Ad
- Strunz classification: 8.BB.30
- Dana classification: 41.06.06.03; Olivenite group
- Crystal system: Orthorhombic
- Crystal class: Dipyramidal (mmm); H–M symbol: (2/m 2/m 2/m)
- Space group: Pnnm

Identification
- Color: Pale yellow, honey-yellow, brownish yellow, reddish; rarely white, colorless, blue, pale green to green, may be zoned
- Crystal habit: Wedge-like prisms typically in druses and radiating clusters; also smooth botryoidal masses
- Cleavage: {101}, good; {010}, poor
- Fracture: Uneven to subconchoidal
- Tenacity: Brittle
- Mohs scale hardness: 3.5
- Luster: Vitreous
- Streak: White to pale green
- Specific gravity: 4.32–4.48 measured
- Optical properties: Biaxial (+/−)
- Refractive index: n_{α}=1.708 – 1.722, n_{β}=1.742 – 1.744, n_{γ}=1.763 – 1.773
- Birefringence: δ = 0.055
- Other characteristics: May fluoresce and phosphoresce lemon-yellow under SW and LW UV.

Adamite is a zinc arsenate hydroxide mineral, Zn_{2}AsO_{4}OH. It is a mineral that typically occurs in the oxidized or weathered zone above zinc ore occurrences. Pure adamite is colorless, but usually it possess yellow color due to Fe compounds admixture. Tints of green also occur and are connected with copper substitutions in the mineral structure. Olivenite is a copper arsenate that is isostructural with adamite and there is considerable substitution between zinc and copper resulting in an intermediate called cuproadamite. Zincolivenite is an intermediate mineral with formula CuZn(AsO_{4})(OH). Manganese, cobalt, and nickel also substitute in the structure. Tarbuttite is an analogous zinc phosphate.

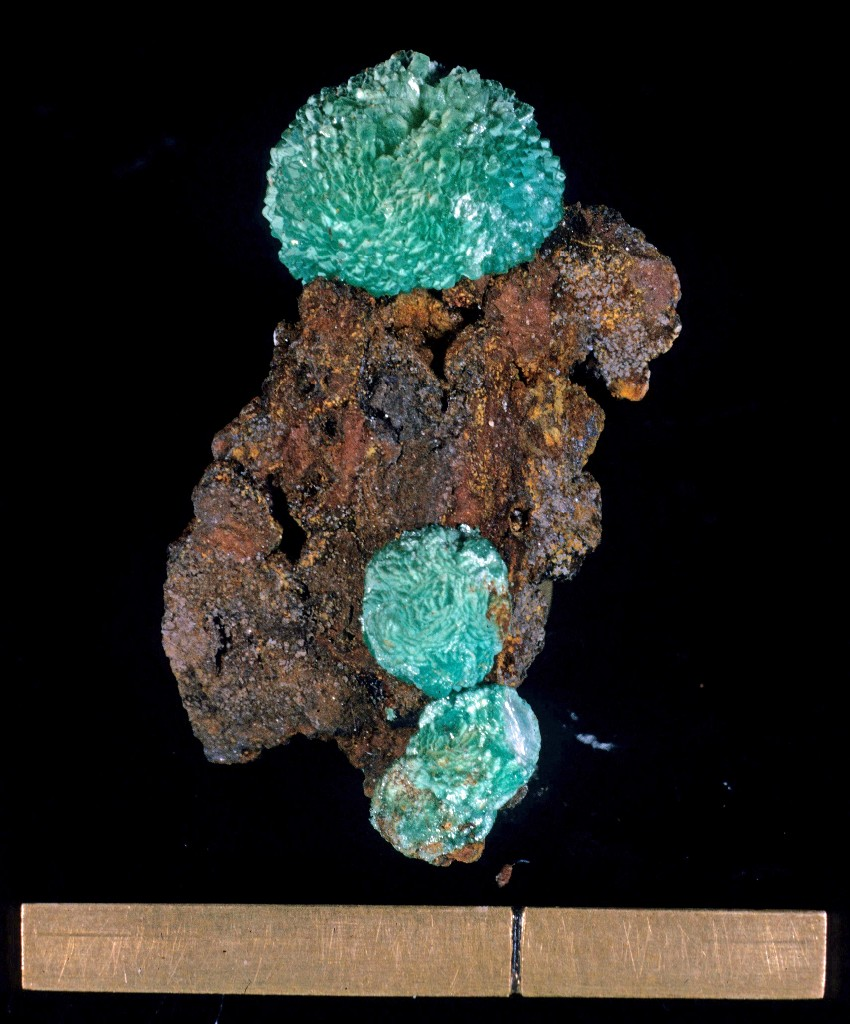
Adamite on limonite from the Gold Hill District Tooele County, Utah, US. Scale at bottom is c. 2.5 cm.

== Occurrence ==
Adamite occurs as a secondary mineral in the oxidized zone of zinc- and arsenic-bearing hydrothermal mineral deposits. It occurs in association with smithsonite, hemimorphite, scorodite, olivenite, calcite, quartz and iron and manganese oxides.

The yellow to bright lime-green colored crystals and druze along with its distinctive fluorescence make adamite a favorite among mineral collectors. Found in Mapimí, Durango, Mexico; Greece; and California and Utah in the United States.

Adamite was named after the French mineralogist Gilbert-Joseph Adam (1795–1881). It was first described in 1866 for an occurrence at the type locality of Chañarcillo, Copiapó Province, Atacama Region, Chile.

== See also ==
- List of minerals
- List of minerals recognized by the International Mineralogical Association
- List of minerals named after people
