= List of radio stations in Durango =

This is a list of CRT-licensed radio stations in the Mexican state of Durango, which can be sorted by their call signs, frequencies, location, ownership, names, and programming formats.

Radio stations in Durango
Call sign	Frequency	Location	Owner	Name	Format
XESRD-AM (Note: Linked to XHSRD-FM, which must keep XESRD-AM on the air until there are no listeners in its service area unserved by other radio stations.)	560 AM	Santiago Papasquiaro	GarzaLR, S.A. de C.V.	La Tremenda	Regional Mexican
XEE-AM (Note: Combo with XHE-FM 105.3)	590 AM	Victoria de Durango	Transmisora Regional Radio Fórmula, S.A. de C.V.	Radio Fórmula	News/talk
XEDGEP-AM	660 AM	Victoria de Durango	Escápate al Paraíso, S.A. de C.V.	—N/a	—N/a
XEDGO-AM	760 AM	Victoria de Durango	Radio Durango, S.A.	La Mejor	Regional Mexican
XETPH-AM	960 AM	Santa María de Ocotán	National Institute of Indigenous Peoples	Las Tres Voces de Durango	Indigenous
XETGME-AM	1270 AM	Gómez Palacio	Media FM, S.A. de C.V.	—N/a	—N/a
XETB-AM (Note: Approved for AM-FM migration in 2022 as XHETB-FM 89.1)	1350 AM	Gómez Palacio	Chat FM, S.A. de C.V.	Kiss FM	Pop
XHPEFM-FM	88.5 FM	Victoria de Durango	Sergio Guevara Guevara	—N/a	—N/a
XHLUAD-FM	88.7 FM	Gómez Palacio	Fomento Educativo y Cultural Francisco de Ibarra, A.C.	Lobos FM	University
XHETB-FM	89.1 FM	Gómez Palacio	Chat FM, S.A. de C.V.	Kiss FM	Pop
XHCPBG-FM	89.1 FM	Santa María de Ocotán	Government of the State of Durango	—N/a	—N/a
XHSRD-FM	89.3 FM	Santiago Papasquiaro	GarzaLR, S.A. de C.V.	La Tremenda	Regional Mexican
XHBP-FM (Note: Operating on an expired concession)	90.3 FM	Gómez Palacio	Radiodifusora XEBP-AM, S.A. de C.V.	Adictivo Radio	News/talk
XHCPAS-FM	90.9 FM	Victoria de Durango	Government of the State of Durango	—N/a	—N/a
XHDGD-FM	91.3 FM	Ninguno (Victoria de Durango)	Radiodifusión Social Comunitaria de Durango, A.C.	Unión Radio	Variety
XHCCAX-FM	91.7 FM	El Salto	Gardom Media Group, S.A. de C.V.	El Viejón	Regional Mexican
XHCCAS-FM	91.9 FM	Gómez Palacio–Lerdo	Tele Saltillo, S.A. de C.V.	—N/a	—N/a
XHCCAU-FM	92.5 FM	Victoria de Durango	Radio Cañón, S.A. de C.V.	W Radio	News/talk
XHUNES-FM	92.9 FM	Victoria de Durango	Universidad Autónoma España de Durango, A.C.	España FM	University
XHPNVO-FM	93.3 FM	El Salto	GPM Grupo Promomedios Culiacán, S.A. de C.V.	La Nueva	Regional Mexican
XHCPAR-FM	93.3 FM	Santiago Papasquiaro	Government of the State of Durango	—N/a	—N/a
XHCCAT-FM	93.7 FM	Canatlán	APGR Comunicaciones, S.A. de C.V.	La Ke Buena	Regional Mexican
XHUAD-FM	94.1 FM	Victoria de Durango	Fomento Educativo y Cultural Francisco de Ibarra, A.C.	Lobos FM	University
XHTJ-FM (Note: Operating on an expired concession)	94.7 FM	Gómez Palacio	X.E.T.J., S.A.	La Voz	Christian
XHCCAV-FM	94.9 FM	Victoria de Durango	APGR Comunicaciones, S.A. de C.V.	La Ke Buena	Regional Mexican
XHCK-FM	95.7 FM	Victoria de Durango	Emisora de Durango, S.A.	Más Pop	Contemporary hit radio
XHDNG-FM	96.5 FM	Victoria de Durango	GarzaLR, S.A. de C.V.	La Tremenda	Regional Mexican
XHCPCA-FM	97.7 FM	Victoria de Durango	Instituto Mexicano de la Radio	—N/a	—N/a
XHWX-FM	98.1 FM	Victoria de Durango	XEWX-AM, S.A. de C.V.	La Poderosa	Regional Mexican
XHDU-FM	98.9 FM	Victoria de Durango	Emisora de Durango, S.A.	La Ley	Regional Mexican
XHCCAW-FM	99.1 FM	Gómez Palacio	Tele Saltillo, S.A. de C.V.	—N/a	—N/a
XHGZ-FM (Note: Operating on an expired concession)	99.5 FM	Gómez Palacio	Radiodifusora XEGZ-AM, S.A. de C.V.	El Viejón	Regional Mexican
XHOH-FM	99.7 FM	Victoria de Durango	XHOH-FM, S.A. de C.V.	Arroba FM	Contemporary hit radio
XHHD-FM	100.5 FM	Victoria de Durango	Universidad Juárez del Estado de Durango	Radio Universidad	University
XHPEM-FM	100.7 FM	Tayoltita	Desarrollo Comunal Sustentable, A.C.	Radio Plata	Mining
XHDN-FM (Note: Operating on an expired concession)	101.1 FM	Gómez Palacio	Radiodifusora XEDN-AM, S.A. de C.V.	Wow	English classic hits
XHCAV-FM	101.3 FM	Victoria de Durango	Emisora de Durango, S.A. de C.V.	Exa FM	Contemporary hit radio
XHRPU-FM	102.9 FM	Victoria de Durango	Radio Triunfos, S.A. de C.V.	La Lupe	Adult hits
XHDGO-FM	103.7 FM	Victoria de Durango	Radio Durango, S.A.	La Mejor	Regional Mexican
XHCPAQ-FM	103.9 FM	Lerdo	Government of the State of Durango	—N/a	—N/a
XHERS-FM	104.3 FM	Gómez Palacio	Radiodifusora XERS-AM, S.A. de C.V.	El Heraldo Radio	News/talk
XHDRD-FM	104.5 FM	Victoria de Durango	XEDRD-AM, S.A. de C.V.	Vida Romántica	Romantic
XHE-FM	105.3 FM	Victoria de Durango	Transmisora Regional Radio Fórmula, S.A. de C.V.	Radio Fórmula	News/talk
XHVK-FM (Note: Operating on an expired concession)	106.7 FM	Gómez Palacio	Emisoras de Torreón, S.A. de C.V.	Pasión FM	Romantic
XHSCHE-FM	107.7 FM	Santa María del Oro	Fundación Radio Impresión, A.C.	Radio Impresión	Community radio
XHSCIU-FM	107.9 FM	Tlahualilo de Zaragoza	Desarrollo Nacional Agroempresarial en el Siglo XXI, S.A. de C.V.	Denagro Radio	Community radio

== See also ==
- List of radio stations in Coahuila for stations on the Coahuila side of the Comarca Lagunera
