= Tayoltita Airfield =

Tayoltita Airfield Aeródromo de Tayoltita
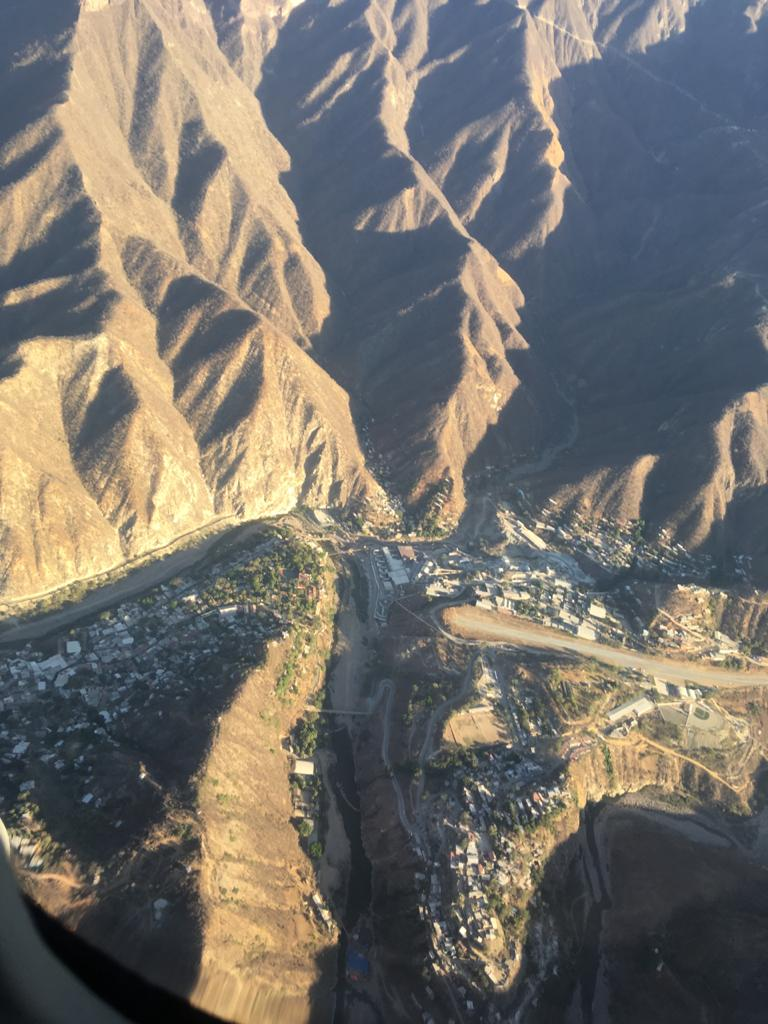
- View of Tayoltita Airfiel (on the right)
- IATA: none; ICAO: none; LID: TAY

Summary
- Airport type: Private with public use
- Operator: Primero Transportes Aéreos S.A. de C.V.
- Serves: Tayoltita
- Location: San Dimas Municipality
- Elevation AMSL: 1,837 ft (560 m)
- Coordinates: 24°06′36″N 105°55′18″W

Map
- Location of the airport in Durango TAY (Mexico)

Runways
Direction	Length		Surface
Direction	ft	m	Surface
05/23	2,460	750	Dirt
- AFAC

The Tayoltita Aerodrome (AFAC: TAY) is a small airfield located in the mining town of Tayoltita in the municipality of San Dimas, Durango. It has an unpaved runway 750 meters long and 60 meters wide, as well as hangars. It is operated by the air taxi company "Primero Transportes Aéreos S.A. de C.V.," which has its operations base and aeronautical workshops at this aerodrome.

== History ==
Due to the economic activity of the Tayoltita mine during the 1930s, the need arose to transport the Tayoltita ore by air to Mazatlán, since it was very difficult to access by land, so in 1934 the company “Líneas Aéreas Mineras (LAMSA)” was founded, which began operations with a Ryan M-1 aircraft.

In 1943 the airline “Transportes Aéreos Terrestres (TATSA)” began operating the Tayoltita-Mazatlán route with Stinson aircraft when LAMSA abandoned the route after being acquired by United Airlines.
