= XHERS-FM =

Radio station in Gómez Palacio, Durango

- Gómez Palacio, Durango; Mexico
- Broadcast area: Comarca Lagunera
- Frequency: 104.3 MHz
- Branding: El Heraldo Radio

Programming
- Format: News / Talk
- Affiliations: El Heraldo de México

Ownership
- Owner: Grupo Radiorama (Organización Radiofónica Mexicana); (Radiodifusora XERS-AM, S.A. de C.V.)
- Operator: El Heraldo de México
- Sister stations: XHBF-FM, XHDN-FM, XHTJ-FM, XHVK-FM, XHYD-FM

History
- First air date: 1952; November 10, 1958 (concession)
- Former call signs: XERS-AM
- Former frequencies: 1380 kHz

Technical information
- Licensing authority: CRT
- Class: B1
- ERP: 25 kW
- HAAT: −37.7 m (−124 ft)
- Transmitter coordinates: 25°34′00″N 103°28′00″W

XHERS-FM is a radio station on 104.3 FM in Gómez Palacio, Durango. The station is owned by Radiorama, operated by El Heraldo Media Group, a subsidiary of El Heraldo de México, and carries the El Heraldo Radio news/talk network news/talk network.

== History ==
XHERS began as XERS-AM 1380, with a concession awarded to Pánfilo González Flores on November 10, 1958. The station had actually signed on six years earlier, in 1952, as part of the 50th anniversary celebrations of the history of Gómez Palacio. In the late 1950s, the station briefly operated from across the state line in Torreón. By the 1960s, it was owned by Radio Catorce, S.A.

In 2007, Radio Catorce, S.A. changed its name and legal status to become Radiodifusora XERS-AM, S.A. de C.V.

On August 17, 2020, Éxtasis Digital moved to XHDN-FM 101.1, and XHERS-FM began broadcasting El Heraldo Radio.
