= La Luz Silver Project =

La Luz Silver Project is a proposed mining venture in the Real de Catorce Desert, San Luis Potosi, Mexico, by Canadian mining company First Majestic Silver.

The project has been met with opposition from groups including the Wixakari, or Huichol tribe, as well the Wirikuta Defense Front.

Wirikuta has been a sacred territory for the Wixarika people for thousands of years. Despite the 2008 of Hauxa Manaka pledging to protect it, at least 70 mining concessions have been granted in Wirikuta to First Majestic Silver, Revolution Resources and other mining companies since 2009. In February 2012, the Wixarika people obtained an injunction, stopping the mining project until a court case about cancelling the mining concessions concludes. Before a gathering of approximately 60,000 people at Wirikuta Fest on May 26, 2012, First Majestic Silver announced it had returned some of their mining concession to the national mining reserve to protect Wirikuta, but the Wixarika Regional Council showed this to be false.
