= Wirikuta =

Sacred site to the Huichol, in Mexico

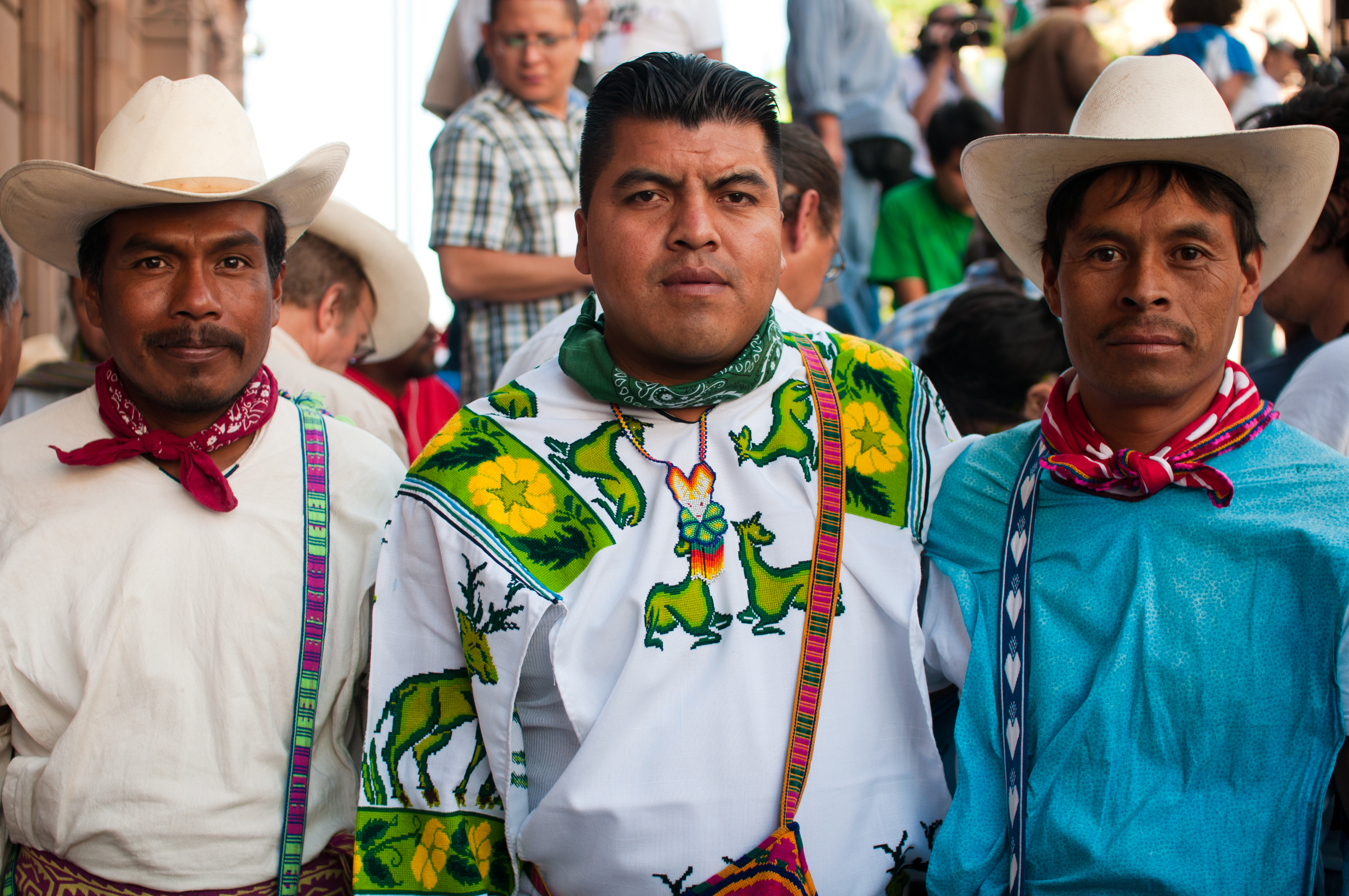
Men at Wirikuta

Wirikuta is a desert, sacred to the Wixárika (Huichol) people high in the mountains of central Mexico, between the Sierra Madre Oriental and the Zacatecas ranges, near Real de Catorce. In Wixárika cosmology, the world is believed to have been created in Wirikuta.

Wirikuta is the focus of a yearly pilgrimage in which community members, led by maraka'ames (shamans), travel approximately 250 miles (400 kilometers) from Jalisco to San Luis Potosí. The area in which the pilgrimage occurs is protected as a UNESCO Natural Sacred Area, but is at risk for exploitation and environmental damage by the foreign mining company First Majestic Silver.

== Sacred places ==
The sun made its first appearance in Wirikuta, and it is the sacred land of the Wixárikas (Huichol's) deified ancestors. They have sacred places on each of the cardinal directions and center.

- Teakata (Santa Catarina, Jalisco), Center
- Huaxamanaka (Cerro Gordo, Durango), North
- Haramara (San Blas, Nayarit), West
- Xapawleyeta (Isla de los Alacranes del Lago Chapala, Jalisco), South.
- Wirikuta, East.

Huichols carry out yearly pilgrimages to Wirikuta or Huiricuta. Between October and March, they follow the journey of their deities from Haramara's sea to the place where the Sun appeared (Reunax), the Cerro Quemado (Leunaxü). Those Gods were guided by Tatewari, the Grandfather Fire. There, a Deer (maxa) used his horns to rise the sun to the sky, illuminating the world.

== Pilgrimage ==
In order to follow the sacred journey, every year the maraka'ames (shamans) travel 250 miles (400 kilometers) from Wixarica's area in Jalisco to San Luis Potosí. At the beginning they walk towards Takata, a sacred area in Sierra Madre Occidental where the temple guard (xuxuricare) will ask for a safe journey. The next step is kalihuey, a Main Temple where they join Wixarica's authorities. They collect peyote - a cactus containing mescaline - along the way, they believe the peyote enables the Wixarica (Huichol) to commune directly with their ancestors and deities. At the end they collect hikuri and take it back to their homes, recreating life's cycle.

Groups travel under the direction of a leading shaman, but may include other shamans who assist on the journey, apprentice shamans, and family groups which may include children. The lead shaman advises participants on their ingestion of peyote and other behavior. Abstinence and purification are important parts of the journey. Participants abstain from sex, and abstain from or limit food, water, and sleep. Early in the journey, participants undergo a rite of public confession and purification, to prepare themselves for further healing and growth as they travel. This includes a retelling of each person's transgressions in front of the group. The most significant transgressions are those of theft, murder and adultery. Confession therefore includes the public recitation of a full personal sexual history. The intention is to create an experience of cleansing and renewal, free of jealousy, shame or blame. A fire invokes Tatehuari while a Maraka'me hits each speaker's legs with a stick so that they may remember correctly and not omit any occurrence.

The pilgrimage is a ritual undertaking that unifies families and communities, reinforces cultural beliefs, practices and values, and serves as a means by which pilgrims can work toward their own individual development. On this personal level, the pilgrimage helps the individual seekers find greater health, awareness, understanding and meaning; in essence it enables the seekers to "find their lives."

== Proposed mining ==
The Wirikuta, a sacred place for the Huichol peoples, is being threatened by the Canadian mining company First Majestic Silver, which has obtained permission from the Mexican government for its proposed La Luz Silver Project for the extraction of silver in the Sierra Decatorce, even though it is transgressing the law in covenants that protect the area Wirikuta and the Wixarika peoples at national and international levels.

The La Luz Silver Project is 100% owned by First Majestic Silver Corp. The property was acquired in 2009 as a result of the acquisition of Normabec Mining Resources. The site consists of mining concessions that cover 6,327 hectares and is located within Real de Catorce, a historically significant mining district with an estimated historic production of 230 million ounces of recovered silver between 1773 and 1990. The La Luz Silver Project is located in the northern portion of San Luís Potosí State, Mexico. The property is approximately 25 km west of the town of Matehuala and 170 km due north of the city of San Luís Potosí, the state capital.

The mining site represents a threat to the environment balance and health of the population in the area. It is adding greater social impacts through the division of local peoples. Chemical substances used in the mining process from previous mines are destroying resources at various levels, which are creating impact on the environment and human health. For example, the mining sites will consume vast quantities of water in an already arid region.

== Flora and Fauna ==
Wirikuta is home to 223 animal species of which 53 are mammals, 141 are birds, 32 are reptiles and 7 are amphibious. The 141 birds registered in Wirikuta represent 15% of Mexico's birds. Some of the fauna of Wirikuta includes:

- Cynomys mexicanus
- Vulpes macrotis
- Taxidea taxus
- Choeronycteris mexicana
- Leptonycteris curasoae
- Leptonycteris nivalis
- Spizella wortheni
- Aquila chrysaetos
- Falco mexicanus
- Asio flammeus
- Parabuteo unicinctus
- Cophosaurus texanus
- Crotaphytus collaris
- Thamnophis cyrtopsis
- Phrynosoma orbiculare
- Kinosternon integrum

In Wirikuta there are 567 registered plant species. Most of the cactaceaes of Wirikuta are on the list of Mexican endangered species (Norma Oficial Mexicana de Plantas Amenazadas y en Peligro de Extinción). A big portion of its flora and fauna is endemic, meaning it can only be found there. These are some of the flora of Wirikuta:

- Lophophora williamsii or peyote
- Ariocarpus retusus
- Manfreda brunnea
- Sagittaria macrophylla
- Pinus culminicola
- Pinus nelsoni
- Pinus pinceana
- Echinocactus
- Larrea tridentata
- Agave lechuguilla
- Yucca
- Mezquite
- Brahea berlandier
- Sedum catorce
- Astrophytum myriostigma
- Lophophora alberto-vojtechii
- Ariocarpus kotschoubeyanus
- Pelecyphora strobiliformis
- Cactaceae - there's 73 species
- Opuntia - there's 300 species
- Echeveria sp. - there's 393 species
