= XHPEM-FM =

Radio station in Tayoltita, Durango

- Tayoltita, San Dimas Municipality, Durango; Mexico
- Frequency: 100.7 MHz
- Branding: Radio Plata

Programming
- Format: Cultural/mining

Ownership
- Owner: Desarrollo Comunal Sustentable, A.C.

History
- First air date: May 2015 (concession)
- Call sign meaning: Primero Empresa Minera, former owner of the San Dimas mine

Technical information
- Licensing authority: CRT
- Class: D
- ERP: .005 kW
- HAAT: −779.7 m (−2,558 ft)
- Transmitter coordinates: 24°06′19.4″N 105°55′41.5″W

XHPEM-FM is a radio station serving Tayoltita, San Dimas Municipality, Durango and owned by Desarrollo Comunal Sustentable, A.C., an arm of the San Dimas silver and gold mine owned by First Majestic Silver. It broadcasts with 5 watts ERP on 100.7 MHz.

It received its social use concession in May 2015 and was among the first stations to ever receive such a concession. The station had been operating prior to then without a concession. Its primary audience is the town of Tayoltita, a mining town sustained by the San Dimas gold and silver mine of Primero Empresa Minera, which was acquired in 2018 by First Majestic Silver; XHPEM represents the community's only mass media. The station was formally relaunched in late 2019 as Radio Plata from a new cultural center in Tayoltita supported by First Majestic.

Until the authorization of XHPINO-FM with 4 watts in 2018, XHPEM-FM was Mexico's least powerful radio station.
