= Huichol Route to Huiricuta =

Wixárika Route through Sacred Sites to Wirikuta (Tatehuarí Huajuyé)
UNESCO World Heritage Site
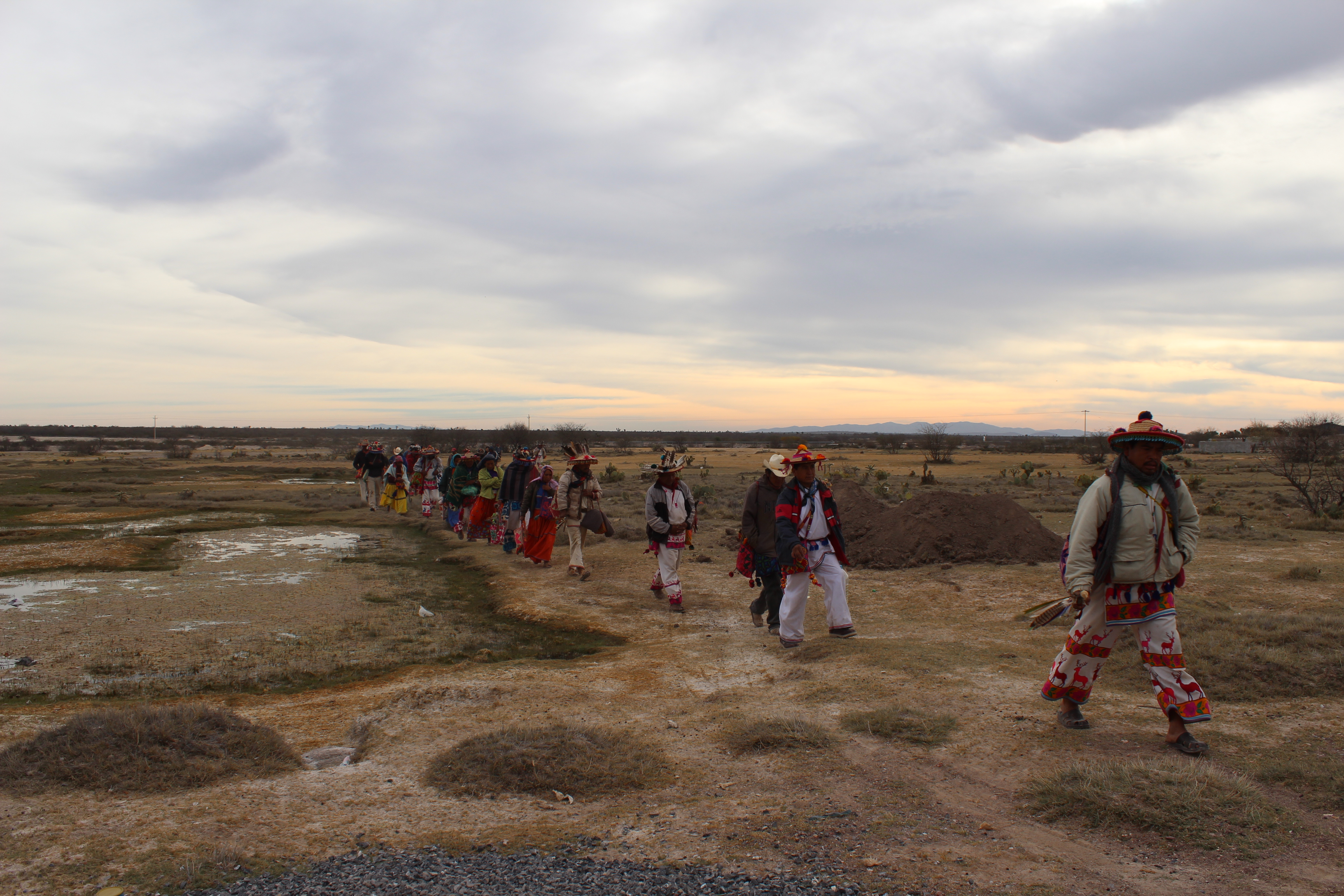
- Huichol people making the pilgrimage in 2013

- Location within Mexico
- Criteria: iii, vi
- Reference: 1704
- Inscription: 2025 (47th Session)
- Coordinates: 22.597°N 103.280°W

The Huichol people of western Mexico exude an enduring spirit and passion to hold on to their traditions. This is exemplified in the pilgrimage route between Nayarit and Wirikuta, stretching nearly 800 km, wherein dozens of sacred sites are visited along the way. The route follows the old pre-Hispanic trade routes between the Gulf of Mexico and the Pacific Ocean. One of the most important of these routes, to Huiricuta or Wirikuta, is known as such for its historical importance in the preservation of Huichol cultural as well as the sheer proliferation of pilgrims that follow the route. Because the Huichol have no written language, the pilgrimage has the added importance of linking populations of Huichol and disseminating knowledge of culture and reinforcing cultural practices.

This site was added to the UNESCO World Heritage Tentative List on December 6, 2004 in the Mixed (Cultural + Natural) category. The site was added to the World Heritage Site list on July 12, 2025.
