= XHDN-FM =

Radio station in Gómez Palacio, Durango, Mexico

Gómez Palacio, Durango; Mexico
- Broadcast area: Comarca Lagunera
- Frequency: 101.1 FM
- Branding: Wow

Programming
- Format: English classic hits

Ownership
- Owner: Radiorama (Organización Radiofónica Mexicana); (Radiodifusora XEDN-AM, S.A. de C.V.)
- Operator: GPS Media
- Sister stations: XHERS, XHVK, XHYD

History
- First air date: November 21, 1942 (concession)
- Former call signs: XEDN-AM
- Former frequencies: 600 kHz
- Call sign meaning: Difusoras del Norte

Technical information
- Class: B1
- ERP: 25 kW
- Transmitter coordinates: 25°34′00″N 103°28′00″W

Links
- Webcast: Listen live
- Website: gpsmedia.com.mx

XHDN-FM is a radio station on 101.1 FM in Gómez Palacio, Durango, Mexico. The station is owned by Grupo Radiorama, operated by GPS Media and known as Wow.

== History ==
XHDN began as XEDN-AM. Its concession was awarded on November 21, 1942, and it broadcast on 600 kHz. It originally was owned by José Bertiz, but it soon became part of Radio Programas de México.

In 1958, Luis de la Rosa took ownership of the station; de la Rosa had been the first president of the Mexican Association of Radio Stations, the predecessor to CIRT, in 1937.

In 1970, Grupo ACIR acquired XEDN, and in 1982 it became part of Radiorama.

XEDN migrated in 2011 to FM on 101.1 MHz.

In 2020, GPS Media was born, assuming control of several stations, including XHDN-FM. XHDN retained its format and rebranded as El Viejón. A further change in the cluster saw Éxtasis Digital, which had relaunched at XHERS-FM 104.3, move to 101.1 in August; El Viejón began broadcasting on XHGZ-FM 99.5. The Éxtasis Digital name was dropped in February 2021 and the station rebranded as "Wow".
