= XHGZ-FM =

As a result of the AM-FM migration in Mexico, two radio stations currently bear the XHGZ-FM callsign:

- XHGZ-FM (Durango), 99.5 FM "La Lupe" in Gómez Palacio, Durango
- XHGZ-FM (Jalisco), 94.3 FM "Radio Universidad de Guadalajara" in Zapotlán el Grande, Jalisco
