= San Miguel de Cruces, Durango =

Coordinates: 24°25′N 105°50′W

San Miguel de Cruces is a town in San Dimas Municipality, in the state of Durango, Mexico.
