= First Majestic Silver =

Canadian silver mining company operating in Mexico

First Majestic Silver Corp.
- Type: Public
- Traded as: TSX: AG; NYSE: AG
- Industry: Mining
- Founded: 2002
- Founder: Keith Neumeyer
- Headquarters: Vancouver, Canada
- Key people: Thomas F. Fudge Jr. Chair; Keith Neumeyer Pres., CEO, director David Soares CFO
- Products: Silver Zinc Lead
- Revenue: US$ 245.5 million
- Operating income: US$ (93) million
- Net income: US$ (61.5) million
- Total assets: US$ 771 million
- Total equity: US$ 520.5 million
- Number of employees: 3,563 December 2012
- Website: www.firstmajestic.com

First Majestic Silver Corp. is a Canadian silver-mining company that operates in Mexico and the United States. It has four producing mines under its control: San Dimas Silver/Gold Mine, Santa Elena Silver/Gold Mine, La Encantada Silver Mine, and Jerritt Canyon Gold Mine. First Majestic also produces and sells its own bullion rounds and bars (others produce and market bullion through private mints).

Total production in 2018 reached 22.2 million ounces (629,000 kg) of silver equivalents, including 11.7 million ounces of pure silver. According to the company, 2019 production from its seven mines is anticipated to be between 24.7 and 27.5 million ounces (700,000 and 779,600 kg) of silver equivalents, including 14.2 to 15.8 million ounces (447,922 kg) of pure silver.

== History ==
First Majestic was founded in 2002 by president and CEO Keith Neumeyer.

In June 2006 First Majestic acquired First Silver Reserve Inc (initially just a controlling stake and within three months it purchased all remaining interest), owner of the San Martin silver property in central Mexico. In September 2006 it took control of Desmin, the owner/operator of La Encantada (Coahuila, Mexico) in a US$4.75 million deal (ownership of the mine was purchased through Desmin from Industrias Penoles for US$3.25 million). At the time La Encantada produced 800,000 ounces per year operating at 40% of capacity; the mine was First Majestic's third.

According to the stock chart on its website and the company's profile on the Venture Exchange website, it is listed since 2002 but the oldest part of the company goes back as far as 1984 (Brandy Resources Inc).

On March 5, 2009, it graduated to the Toronto Stock Exchange with an initial offering of Cdn$25 million. About a year and a half later it joined the New York Stock Exchange (Dec.23, 2010).

In 2009 First Majestic added a fourth silver project when it acquired Normabec Mining Resources Ltd (completed in September). Initially the deal was thought to have included both Mexico's Real de Catorce mine and Quebec's Pitt Gold Property. However, non-Mexican assets (including Pitt Gold) were spun off into a new company called Bionor Resources Inc, which is now Magna Terra Minerals.

In January 2018 First Majestic acquired Primero Mining and the San Dimas silver-gold mine in Durango, Mexico.

== Projects ==
There are seven projects in total:

- San Dimas is the company's cornerstone property, acquired in May 2018. The property is located in Durango, Mexico and includes a 2,500 tpd cyanidation mill and a 71,867 hectares land package. Approximately 1,800 workers are employed at the mine, mostly from the nearby community of Tayoltita (population 8,000). Production at San Dimas began in 1757, with the first cyanidation mill built in 1904.
- Santa Elena is located in Sonora, Mexico and employs approximately 300 workers from the nearby municipality of Banámichi (pop. 1,500 in 2005). When First Majestic acquired the property in late 2015 it consisted of a 3,000 tpd cyanidation plant, an underground mine, an open pit mine, a leach pad, and an 85, 646 hectares land package. The company recently added 16,526 hectares of mining concessions by acquiring 100% of the adjacent Ermitaño project. Ermitaño contains resources of 50+ million silver equivalent ounces, and First Majestic is targeting late 2020 for commercial production from this new asset.
- La Encantada has been in the company's portfolio of assets since 2006 and includes a 4,000 tpd cyanidation processing plant and 4,076 hectares of mining rights. The property is located in Coahuila, Mexico within a couple hundred km of the Mexico-Texas border. The site employs 782 full-time workers (most from the immediate area which is an isolated region). The mill at La Encantada opened in the summer of 2008 and reached commercial production in April 2010. Recent upgrades at the property include a 20% reduction in energy costs by converting from diesel powered generators to LNG, implementation of high-intensity grinding (HIG) mills, and a coal-powered roaster to unlock manganese encapsulated Silver from ore.
- La Parrilla consists of mining rights covering 69,460 hectares of land, making it First Majestic's largest land package. The property recently underwent an expansion project that saw the mill capacity increase to 2,000 tpd. Since 1983 the mine (operating continuously) has produced over 25 million ounces of silver (as of 2010).
- Del Toro, Chalchihuites, Zacatecas consists of two mine sites: San Juan and Perseverancia. The first phase of the project was inaugurated in January 2013, and the mill began processing at a rate of 1,000 tpd. Further expansions are planned for this project, and it will ultimately reach 4,000 tpd.
- San Martin, Jalisco State, Mexico produces approximately 1 million ounces of silver annually. It is primarily a silver doré producer.
- La Guitarra, Mexico State, Mexico became First Majestic's fourth producing mine when it was acquired from Vancouver-based Silvermex Resources in July 2012 and sold to Canadian mining company Sierra Madre Gold and Silver Ltd. in May 2022.

== Environmental impacts on Wirikuta ==
Wirikuta, one of the sacred mountains of the Huichol people and important in their ceremonial migration, peyote hunt, and deer dance, is being purchased for silver mining by First Majestic Silver Corp. On October 27, 2000 United Nations Education, Scientific and Cultural Organization (UNESCO) claimed this site as a protected area for its importance as a cultural route and endemic flora and fauna species. Before a gathering of 60,000 people at Wirikuta Fest on May 26, 2012, First Majestic Silver announced it had returned some of their mining concessions to the national mining reserve to protect Wirikuta, but the Wixarika Regional Council exposed this as a farce. Later on June 9, 2001, it was declared as a National Sacred Site under the State of San Luis Potosí's Natural Protection Act. First Majestic Silver Corp still decided to purchase mineral rights on November 13, 2009, with 80% of their interest within the protected land.

The company's production plan and the characteristics of the narrow vein mineral deposit only allows an underground mining system (as has been done for 200 years) using modern methods of mining production. The ore that the company will extract will be silver values through the FLOTATION Method, which uses biodegradable chemical reagents that are harmless to the environment and the human being. National and international environmental and health standards will be complied with.

Waterproof material will be used at the base of the Waste Warehouse, which prevents the filtration of liquids to the subsoil. In April, 2010 the company reached full production capacity at its La Encantada mine in Coahuila, Mexico, processing 3,500 tons of ore per day. First Majestic Silver uses the cyanidation leaching method to extract silver precipitates from ore. Currently the Huicholes are trying to find outside groups to help them in the conservation of their land and culture by protecting this mountain, as well as appealing to the President to honor his agreement to protect their holy sites.

It remains to be seen if the company is able to extract the precious metal with minimal impact to the above ground heritage site.
