= Tatewari =

Huichol God of Fire

Tatewari, in Huichol folklore, is the god of fire, called by them 'grandfather fire'. He is also the shaman of ancient times, the patron of all shamans. Amongst his actions are burning the fields so that they are ready for the planting of crops, he helps the Huichol hunt deer and, as the representation of fire, cooks food. As part of his shaman duties, he accompanies shamans when they go to cure a sick person. Feathers act as his messengers, which are generally worn on the stick of shamans.

== See also ==
- Huichol
- Indigenous peoples of Mexico
