= XHWX-FM =

Radio station in Durango, Durango, Mexico

- Durango, Durango; Mexico
- Frequency: 98.1 FM
- Branding: La Poderosa

Programming
- Format: Regional Mexican

Ownership
- Owner: Grupo Radiorama; (XEWX-AM, S.A. de C.V.)
- Sister stations: XHOH-FM, XHDRD-FM

History
- First air date: May 3, 1989 (concession)
- Former call signs: XEWX-AM
- Former frequencies: 660 kHz

Technical information
- Licensing authority: CRT
- Class: B
- ERP: 25,000 watts
- HAAT: 44.5 m (146 ft)
- Transmitter coordinates: 24°03′04″N 104°37′39″W

Links
- Webcast: sts.pergom.mx/xhwx
- Website: lapoderosaenlinea.com/durango

XHWX-FM is a radio station in Durango, Durango. It broadcasts on 98.1 FM and is owned by Grupo Radiorama, and carries a Regional Mexican format known as La Poderosa.

== History ==
XEWX-AM 660 received its concession on May 3, 1989. It was authorized to migrate to FM in 2011.

Previous logo
