= XHOH-FM =

Radio station in Durango, Durango, Mexico

- Durango, Durango; Mexico
- Frequency: 99.7 FM
- Branding: @FM (Arroba FM)

Programming
- Format: English and Spanish contemporary hit radio

Ownership
- Owner: Grupo Radiorama; (XHOH-FM, S.A. de C.V.)
- Sister stations: XHWX-FM, XHDRD-FM

History
- First air date: August 25, 1993 (concession)
- Former frequencies: 107.7 FM (1993–2020)

Technical information
- Licensing authority: CRT
- Class: B1
- ERP: 14,800 watts
- HAAT: −12 m (−39 ft)

Links
- Webcast: Listen live
- Website: arroba.fm radioramadurango.mx

XHOH-FM is a radio station in Durango, Durango, Mexico. Broadcasting on 99.7 FM, XHOH is owned by Grupo Radiorama and carries its @FM (Arroba FM) contemporary hit radio format.

== History ==
XHOH received its concession on August 25, 1993. It was originally owned by Radio Social, S.A., a subsidiary of Radiorama, and broadcast on 107.7 MHz.

XHOH moved to 99.7 on June 2, 2020. The move, like that of sister XHDRD-FM two years prior, was required as a condition of its concession renewal, to clear the 106–108 MHz sub-band for community and indigenous stations.
