= XHSRD-FM =

Radio station in Santiago Papasquiaro, Durango, Mexico

XHSRD-FM / XESRD-AM
- Santiago Papasquiaro, Durango; Mexico
- Frequency: 89.3 FM / 560 AM
- Branding: La Tremenda

Programming
- Format: Regional Mexican

Ownership
- Owner: Grupo Garza Limón; (Garzalr, S.A. de C.V.)

History
- First air date: August 21, 1986 (concession)
- Call sign meaning: Santiago PapasquiaRo Durango

Technical information
- Licensing authority: CRT
- Class: B1 (FM); B (AM)
- Power: (AM) 10 kWs daytime 1 kW nighttime
- ERP: (FM) 1 kW
- HAAT: 517.1 m (1,697 ft)
- Transmitter coordinates: 25°04′54.83″N 105°18′53.93″W

Links
- Webcast: Listen live
- Website: latremenda.com.mx

XHSRD-FM/XESRD-AM is a radio station in Santiago Papasquiaro, Durango. It is owned by Grupo Garza Limón and known as La Tremenda, carrying a Regional Mexican format.

== History ==
XESRD received its concession on August 21, 1986. Initially owned by Ricardo León Garza Limón (who founded Grupo Garza Limón), XESRD broadcast on 560 kHz with 5,000 watts during the day and 250 watts at night.

XESRD migrated to FM in 2011 as XHSRD-FM, but it was required to maintain its AM station, as communities could lose radio service were the AM station to go off the air. The FM transmitter is located atop Cerro China.
