= XHDGO-FM =

Radio station in Durango, Durango, Mexico

XHDGO-FM / XEDGO-AM
- Durango, Durango; Mexico
- Frequencies: 103.7 (MHz); 760 (kHz)
- Branding: La Mejor

Programming
- Format: Regional Mexican
- Affiliations: MVS Radio

Ownership
- Owner: Grupo Radio Carlos C. Armas Vega; (Radio Durango, S.A.)
- Sister stations: XHCAV-FM, XHDU-FM

History
- First air date: July 20, 1966 (AM); 1994 (FM)
- Call sign meaning: DuranGO

Technical information
- Licensing authority: CRT
- Class: B (AM); B1 (FM)
- Power: 5,000 watts daytime 500 watts nighttime (AM)
- ERP: 10,000 watts (FM)
- HAAT: −28.7 m (−94 ft)
- Transmitter coordinates: 24°03′00″N 104°37′21″W

Links
- Website: lamejor.com.mx/durango

XHDGO-FM / XEDGO-AM is a radio station on 103.7 FM and 760 AM in Durango, Durango. The station is owned by Grupo Radio Carlos C. Armas Vega and carries the La Mejor Regional Mexican format from MVS Radio.

== History ==
XEDGO officially signed on July 20, 1966. It gained its FM counterpart in 1994 as part of the first wave of licensed AM-FM combos.
