= Francisco Gómez Palacio y Bravo =

Mexican politician

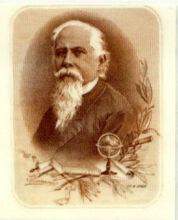
Francisco Gómez Palacio, Governor of the Mexican State of Durango

Francisco Gómez Palacio y Bravo (May 29, 1824 – February 27, 1886) was a Mexican writer, educator, jurist and Liberal politician. He served twice as governor of Durango (1867–68 and 1880–83). In October 1887 he was declared Benemérito of the state by the Legislature.

== Biography ==
Gómez's father, Victoriano Gómez del Palacio, was a Spaniard by birth. His mother, María Manuela Eutimia Bravo de Castilla Monserrate, was born in Nombre de Dios, Durango. They were 39 and 24, respectively, when they had Gómez.

Gómez was born in Victoria de Durango in 1824. He studied in the Seminario Conciliar of Durango, considered at this time to be the best educational institution in northern Mexico. He grew up in an atmosphere of culture, with excellent teachers, and came to love scholarship. He was fluent in six foreign languages — Greek, Latin, English, French, German and Italian. He was considered one of the most cultured men of his time, not only in Durango but in the country. His speeches were enriched with quotes from classical and world thinkers.

He translated Mark Twain's novel Life on the Mississippi into Spanish.

Gómez was the founder of the Civil College of the State, now Juárez University of Durango, as well as rector and professor at the college. In addition to his terms as governor of Durango, he also served three times in Congress.

=== Political career ===
Most of his life was spent in the politics of his native state. He served in the following positions:

- Secretary of the interior in the administration of Governor Pedro Ochoa Natera, from April to September 1847
- Deputy to the national Congress, from 1848 to 1849
- Administrator of the government income from tobacco, from 1854 to 1855
- Rector of the State College in 1856 and director of the College of Law
- In 1857 he was elected a deputy to the Constituent Congress, but he did not take up the position because he was named a member of the Mixed Claims Commission with the United States, when the latter country claimed many millions of pesos of indemnification. He helped reduce the claims to a minimum
- Attorney general of Mexico
- From 1862 to 1863 he was successively mayor of Durango, justice of the state supreme court and secretary of the interior in the state administration of Benigno Silva
- On December 2, 1867, he became governor of the State of Durango, a position he held until December 20, 1868. During this time he supported in Congress the accusations against federal deputy Benigno Canto over the assassination of General José María Patoni. He got Canto removed from office and arrested. Canto died in prison without revealing the reasons for the assassination.
- On September 16, 1880, he again took office as governor of Durango, after winning elections. He served until September 16, 1883, when he resigned over his inability to get the Mexican Central Railroad to arrive at Durango, something he had promised the inhabitants of the city.

=== Death ===
Attorney Francisco Gómez Palacio died on February 27, 1886, in the city of Durango. That same year Santiago Lavín Cuadra donated land for the foundation of the city of Gómez Palacio, Durango, named in his honor. It now has nearly 250,000 people.
