= XHDU-FM =

Radio station in Durango City, Durango, Mexico

- Durango City, Durango; Mexico
- Frequency: 98.9 FM
- Branding: La que le Gusta a Usted (The One You Like)

Programming
- Format: Regional Mexican
- Affiliations: MVS Noticias

Ownership
- Owner: Armas Radio; (Emisora de Durango, S.A.)
- Sister stations: XHCAV-FM, XHDGO-FM

History
- First air date: December 18, 1944
- Former frequencies: 860 AM
- Call sign meaning: "Durango"

Technical information
- Licensing authority: CRT
- Class: B1
- ERP: 25,000 watts
- HAAT: 28.4 m (93 ft)
- Transmitter coordinates: 24°03′00″N 104°37′21″W

Links
- Website: laquelegustaausted.com

XHDU-FM (98.9 FM) is a regional Mexican radio station in Durango City, Durango, Mexico. It is owned by Armas Radio and known as La que le Gusta a Usted.

== History ==
Logo used with the previous brand known as La Ley.

XEDU-AM 860 received its first concession, then for 1400 kHz, in March 1943, and it signed on December 18, 1944. By the 1960s, XEDU broadcast on 860 kHz. It migrated to FM in 2011.
