= XHCAV-FM =

Radio station in Durango, Durango, Mexico

- Durango, Durango; Mexico
- Frequency: 101.3 MHz
- Branding: Exa FM

Programming
- Format: Contemporary hit radio
- Affiliations: MVS Radio

Ownership
- Owner: Grupo Radio Carlos C. Armas Vega; (Emisora de Durango, S.A.)
- Sister stations: XHDGO-FM, XHDU-FM

History
- First air date: October 2, 1954
- Former call signs: XEND-AM, XEDGO-AM
- Former frequencies: 1470 kHz
- Call sign meaning: Carlos Armas Vega

Technical information
- Licensing authority: CRT
- Class: B1
- ERP: 25,000 watts
- HAAT: 28.4 m (93 ft)
- Transmitter coordinates: 24°03′00″N 104°37′21″W

Links
- Webcast: Listen live
- Website: exafm.com/durango/

XHCAV-FM is a radio station on 101.3 FM in Durango, Durango, Mexico. It carries the Exa FM national format from MVS Radio.

== History ==
In 1954, the concession was authorized for a new radio station on 1470 kHz, XEND-AM. Sometime in the early 1970s, the station's calls changed to XECAV-AM in recognition of the founder of the radio group, Carlos Armas Vega.

It has always been a youth format station of Grupo Radio Armas, first as "Radio Internacional", "Radio Caliente" and "Play"

The station migrated to FM in the early 2010s.
