= XHYD-FM =

Radio station in Francisco I. Madero, Coahuila, Mexico

- Francisco I. Madero, Coahuila; Mexico
- Broadcast area: Comarca Lagunera
- Frequency: 105.1 FM
- Branding: Capullo FM

Programming
- Format: Variety hits

Ownership
- Owner: Radiorama, Organización Radiofónica Mexicana; (Radiodifusora XEYD-AM, S.A. de C.V.)
- Operator: GPS Media
- Sister stations: XHVK-FM

History
- First air date: November 22, 1971 (concession)

Technical information
- Licensing authority: CRT
- Class: AA
- ERP: 6 kW
- HAAT: 25.18 m (82.6 ft)
- Transmitter coordinates: 25°45′48″N 103°14′40″W

Links
- Webcast: Listen live
- Website: xhydcapullo.com

XHYD-FM is a radio station on 105.1 FM in Francisco I. Madero, Coahuila, Mexico. The station is operated by GPS Media and carries its Capullo FM variety hits format.

== History ==
XHYD began as XEYD-AM 1410, with a concession awarded to Alejandro Rodríguez Morán on November 22, 1971. The station migrated to FM in 2011 and sold in 2015.

XHYD as La Mexicana

In 2020, GPS Media was born, taking control of several stations, including XHYD-FM. All of the stations operated by the new group were rebranded.
