= XHDRD-FM =

Radio station in Durango, Durango, Mexico

- Durango, Durango; Mexico
- Frequency: 104.5 FM
- Branding: Vida Romántica

Programming
- Format: Romantic

Ownership
- Owner: Radiorama; (XEDRD-AM, S.A. de C.V.)
- Sister stations: XHWX-FM, XHOH-FM

History
- First air date: November 28, 1988 (concession)
- Former frequencies: 820 AM, 106.1 FM
- Call sign meaning: DuRango Durango

Technical information
- Licensing authority: CRT
- Class: B1
- ERP: 25,000 watts
- HAAT: 44.7 m (147 ft)

Links
- Webcast: Listen live
- Website: vidaromanticaenlinea.com

XHDRD-FM is a radio station in Durango, Durango, Mexico, broadcasting on 104.5 FM with a romantic format known as Vida Romántica.

== History ==
Final logo on 106.1 MHz

XEDRD-AM 820 received its concession on November 28, 1988. It was owned by Radiorama subsidiary Audio Panorama, S.A.

XEDRD-AM moved to FM in the early 2010s on 106.1 MHz as XHDRD-FM. In 2015, XHDRD flipped from W Radio to Romántica.

XHDRD moved to 104.5 MHz in February 2018 in order to clear 106-108 MHz for community and indigenous radio stations.

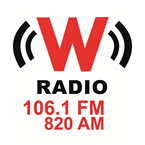
XHDRD-FM logo as W Radio
