= XHTJ-FM =

Radio station in Gómez Palacio, Durango, Mexico

- Gómez Palacio, Durango; Mexico
- Broadcast area: Comarca Lagunera
- Frequency: 94.7 FM
- Branding: 94.7 FM

Programming
- Format: Grupera music

Ownership
- Owner: Radiorama; (X.E.T.J., S.A.)
- Sister stations: XHVK

History
- First air date: 1949; April 16, 1953 (concession)

Technical information
- ERP: 25 kW
- Transmitter coordinates: 25°34′00″N 103°28′00″W

Links
- Webcast: Listen live
- Website: xhtjlavoz.com

XHTJ-FM is a radio station on 94.7 FM in Gómez Palacio, Durango, Mexico. The station carries a Christian format known as La Voz.

== History ==
XHTJ began as XETJ-AM 570. It was owned by Alejandro O. Stevenson with a concession dated April 16, 1953, but it had begun operations in 1949. It was known as Radio Alegría and carried primarily norteña and tropical music.

XETJ migrated in 2011 to FM on 94.7 MHz.
