= San Dimas Municipality =

Municipality in the Mexican state of Durango

San Dimas
- Municipality
- Location within Durango Location within Mexico
- Coordinates: 24°06′N 105°56′W
- Country: Mexico
- State: Durango
- Municipal seat: Tayoltita
- Named for: St. Dismas

Area
  - Total: 5,620.5 km^{2} (2,170.1 sq mi)

Population (2010)
  - Total: 19,691
  - Density: 3.5034/km^{2} (9.0738/sq mi)
- Time zone: UTC-6 (Zona Centro)

San Dimas is a municipality in the Mexican state of Durango. The municipal seat lies at Tayoltita. The municipality covers an area of 5,620.5 km^{2}.

As of 2010, the municipality had a total population of 19,691, up from 19,303 as of 2005.

The municipality has 590 localities, the largest of which (with 2010 populations in parentheses) are: Tayoltita (5,124), classified as urban, and San Miguel de Cruces (1,816), classified as rural.
