= XHGZ-FM (Durango) =

Radio station in Gómez Palacio, Durango

- Gómez Palacio, Durango; Mexico
- Frequency: 99.5 FM
- Branding: La Z

Programming
- Format: Regional Mexican

Ownership
- Owner: Grupo Radiorama (Organización Radiofónica Mexicana); (Radiodifusora XEGZ-AM, S.A. de C.V.)
- Operator: Grupo Radio Centro

History
- First air date: 1957 (as XEGZ-AM)
- Call sign meaning: GómeZ Palacio

Technical information
- ERP: 25 kW
- Transmitter coordinates: 25°34′00″N 103°28′00″W

XHGZ-FM is a radio station in Gómez Palacio, Durango broadcasting on 99.5 FM. It is owned by Grupo Radiorama and operated by Grupo Radio Centro, and is known as La Z with a Regional Mexican format.

== History ==
Logo used as Milenio Radio Laguna

XHGZ began in 1957 as XEGZ-AM 790, licensed to Ciudad Lerdo and owned by Alejandro Stevenson. Formats over the years included La Pantera, Radio 790 and Rockola 790.

The station received permission to migrate to FM in 2011. On AM, Radiorama placed some of its own formats on 790, such as W Radio (a news-talk format) and Colorín ColorRadio (a Spanish-language children's music format); when the station migrated, it took on the Milenio Radio format of news-talk programming.

In March 2018, XHGZ converted to La Lupe, a new Regional Mexican classic hits format from Multimedios.

In 2019, Multimedios Radio took control of the FM station of the Grupo Radio Centro cluster in Torreón, Coahuila; La Lupe was moved to XHETOR on 99.9 FM. After a simulcast, Radiorama returned to operating XHGZ-FM as a Regional Mexican format known as "La Poderosa". A further change in the cluster saw GPS Media's El Viejón, previously at 101.1 MHz, being moved to 99.5 in August 2020.
