= Real de Catorce =

- Locality
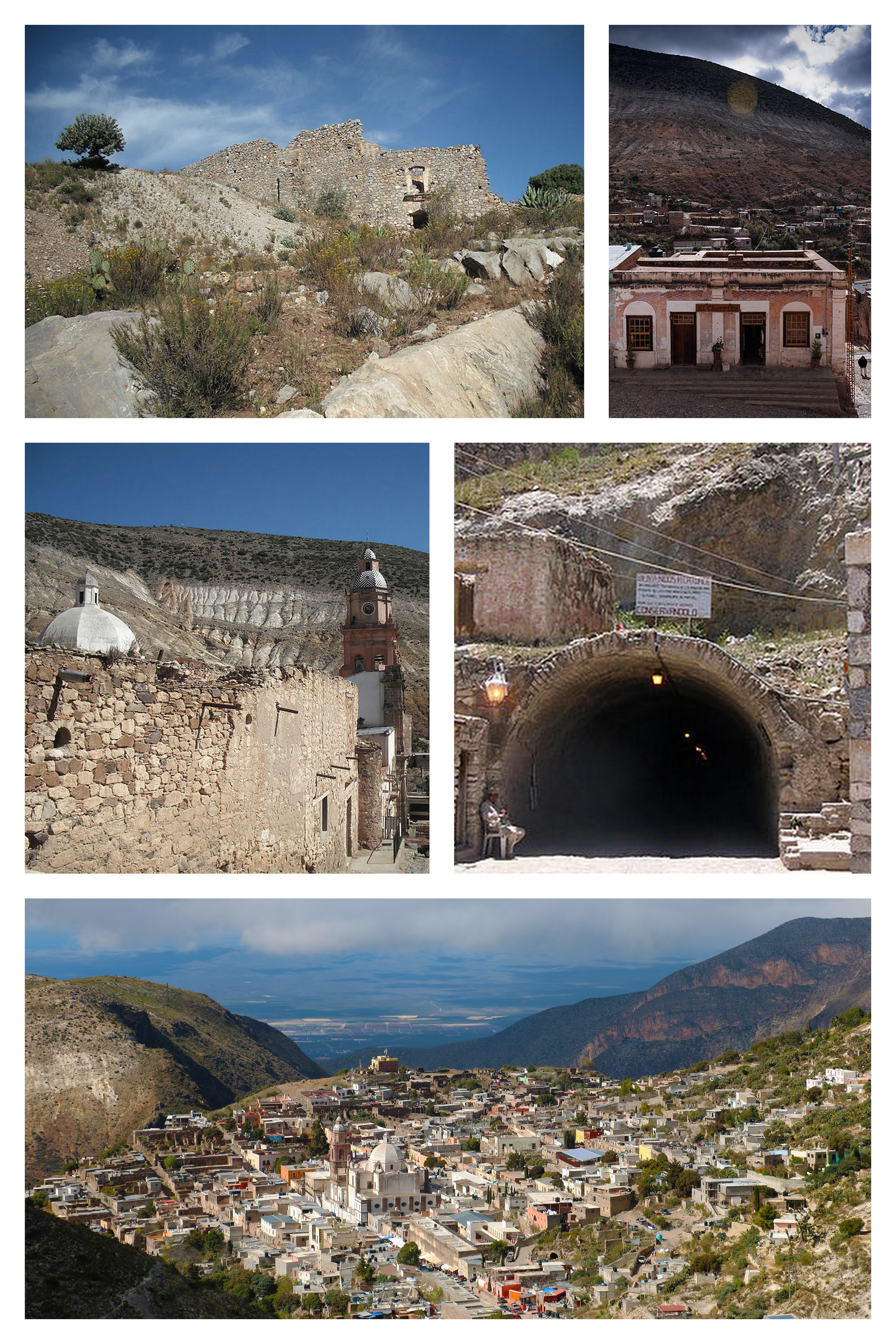
- Various landmarks in Real de Catorce

- Location within San Luis Potosí Location within Mexico
- Coordinates: 23°41′23″N 100°53′15″W
- Country: Mexico
- State: San Luis Potosí
- Municipality: Catorce
- Elevation: 2,728 m (8,950 ft)

Population (2010)
  - Total: 1,392
- Time zone: UTC-6 (CST)
- Postal code: 78550

Real de Catorce (Spanish: [reˈal de kaˈtoɾse]; lit. 'Real of Fourteen'), often shortened to Real, is a village in the Mexican state of San Luis Potosí and the seat of the municipality of Catorce. It is located 160 miles (260 km) north of the city of San Luis Potosí, and currently has a full-time population of under 1,000 residents. This 'ghost-town' in the high and dry expanses of northern San Luis Potosí state was once a thriving silver mining settlement. Real de Catorce has long been a pilgrimage site for both local Catholics and Huichol shamanists, and is now being discovered by international tourists drawn by the desert ambience and reputed spiritual energy.

== Geography ==
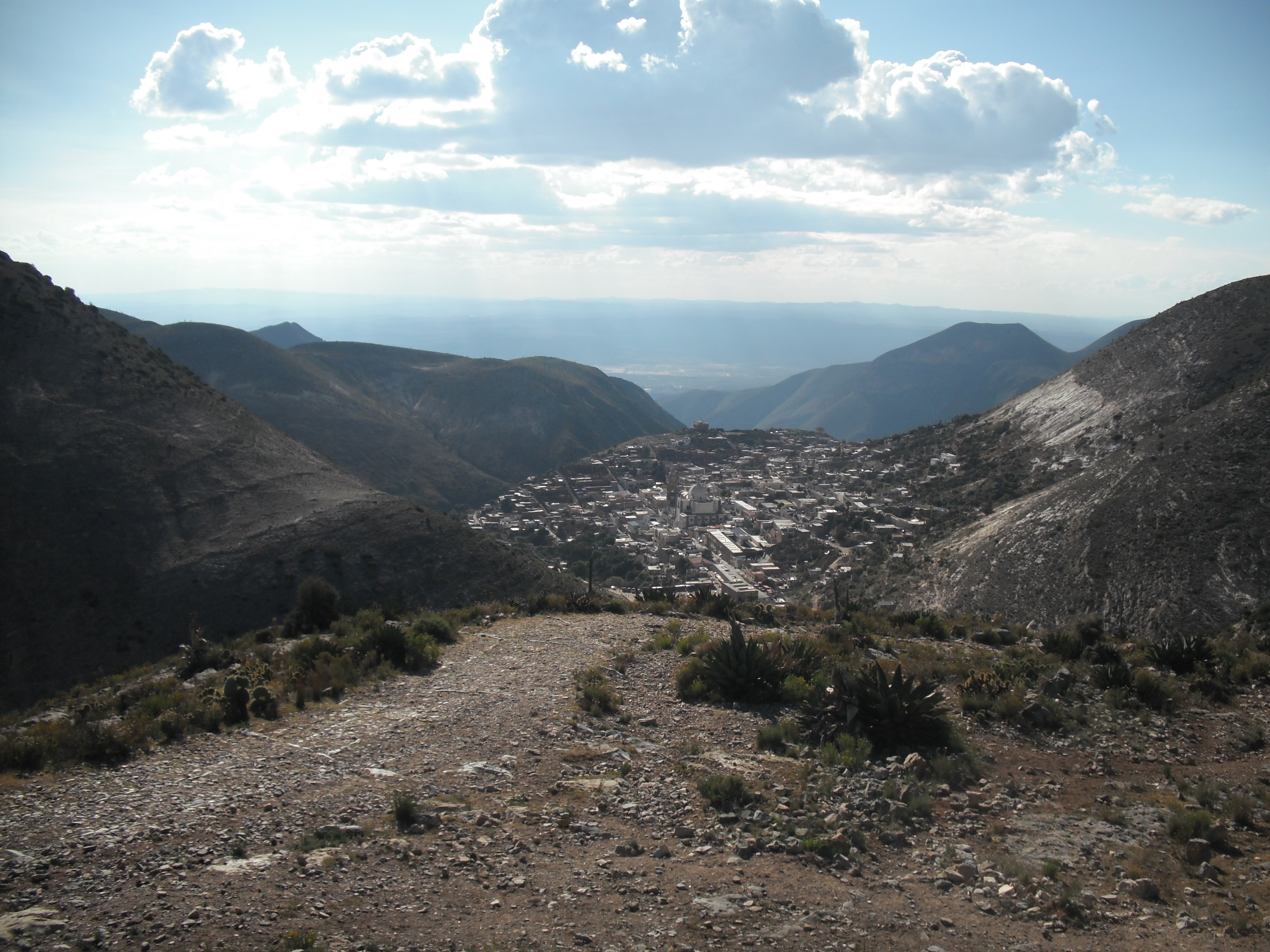
View of Real de Catorce from the hill behind the town center

The village of Real de Catorce sits on the side of a mountain at more than 2,743 meters (9,000 ft). It is located in the Sierra de Catorce range, one of the highest plateaus in Mexico, where summits may extend over 10,000 feet (3,000 m). These mountains lie in the arid Mexican Plateau, cut off from trade winds of the Gulf of Mexico by the high peaks of the Sierra Madre Oriental.

The main road to Real de Catorce leaves Highway 62 between Matehuala and San Tiburcio. This is roughly to the east of Real, near the town of Cedral. From the main highway there is a 17-mile (27 km) cobblestone road which rises into the sierra, then the 1.5-mile (2.4 km) long Ogarrio Tunnel which only accepts vehicles one way (with travelers in and out having to wait their turn).

=== Mining ===
The Cerro Quemado mountain is an important site for the Huichol ceremonial migration, peyote hunt, and deer dance. On October 27, 2000 United Nations Education, Scientific and Cultural Organization (UNESCO) claimed this site as a protected area for its importance as a cultural route and endemic flora and fauna species. Later on June 9, 2001 it was declared as a National Sacred Site under the State of San Luis Potosí's Natural Protection act. Canada's First Majestic Silver Corp purchased underground mineral rights on November 13, 2009 with 80% of the purchased mineral rights being within the protected zone. On September 12, 2013 Mining Plans have been suspended. This legal action, granted by the federal courts, halts all mining projects in the sacred Wirikuta territory, an area covering approximately 140,000 hectares (350,000 acres), in the municipalities of Catorce, Charcas, Matehuala, Villa de Ramos, Villa de Guadalupe and Villa de la Paz in the Mexican state of San Luis Potosí.

=== Trash ===
Discussions regarding proper disposal of trash and possible recycling programs have been ongoing since at least 2005. However, since August 2011, all trash is still being trucked several kilometers west of town where it is partially incinerated in an open pit.

=== Water and sewage ===
Despite an investment of over 5 million pesos in combined funds (2008) for water and sewage projects, there is no sewage treatment facility, nor are the "water system extensions" in complete service as of August 2011.

== History ==
Real de Catorce ('Royal Fourteen') is named for 14 Spanish soldiers killed here in an ambush by Chichimeca warriors. Other sources tell that in the beginning the name was "Real de Álamos de la Purísima Concepción de los Catorce" (Real de Alamos of the Immaculate Conception of the Fourteen). Although a town had been there for many years, silver was discovered in the local mountains in 1772 and a few years later in 1779 the village was officially founded. The parish church was built between 1790 and 1817. Real de Catorce's heyday was in the late 19th century, when it had a population of 15,000, with some of Mexico's richest silver mines and a mint, as well as a bullring and shops selling European luxury goods. It was almost completely abandoned when the price of silver plummeted after 1900; only a few people remained in this ghost town, eking out a living from mine tailings and an annual influx of pilgrims to a reputedly miraculous image of St. Francis in the parish church. Today, its main income comes from tourism.

Several major commercial motion pictures have been filmed in Real including Bandidas (featuring Salma Hayek and Penélope Cruz), The Mexican (featuring Brad Pitt and Julia Roberts), and some scenes of The Treasure of the Sierra Madre (featuring Humphrey Bogart), and of Puerto Escondido, directed by Gabriele Salvatores.

British indie rock band alt-J recorded their video for their song 3WW in the town and outskirts in 2017.

== Attractions ==
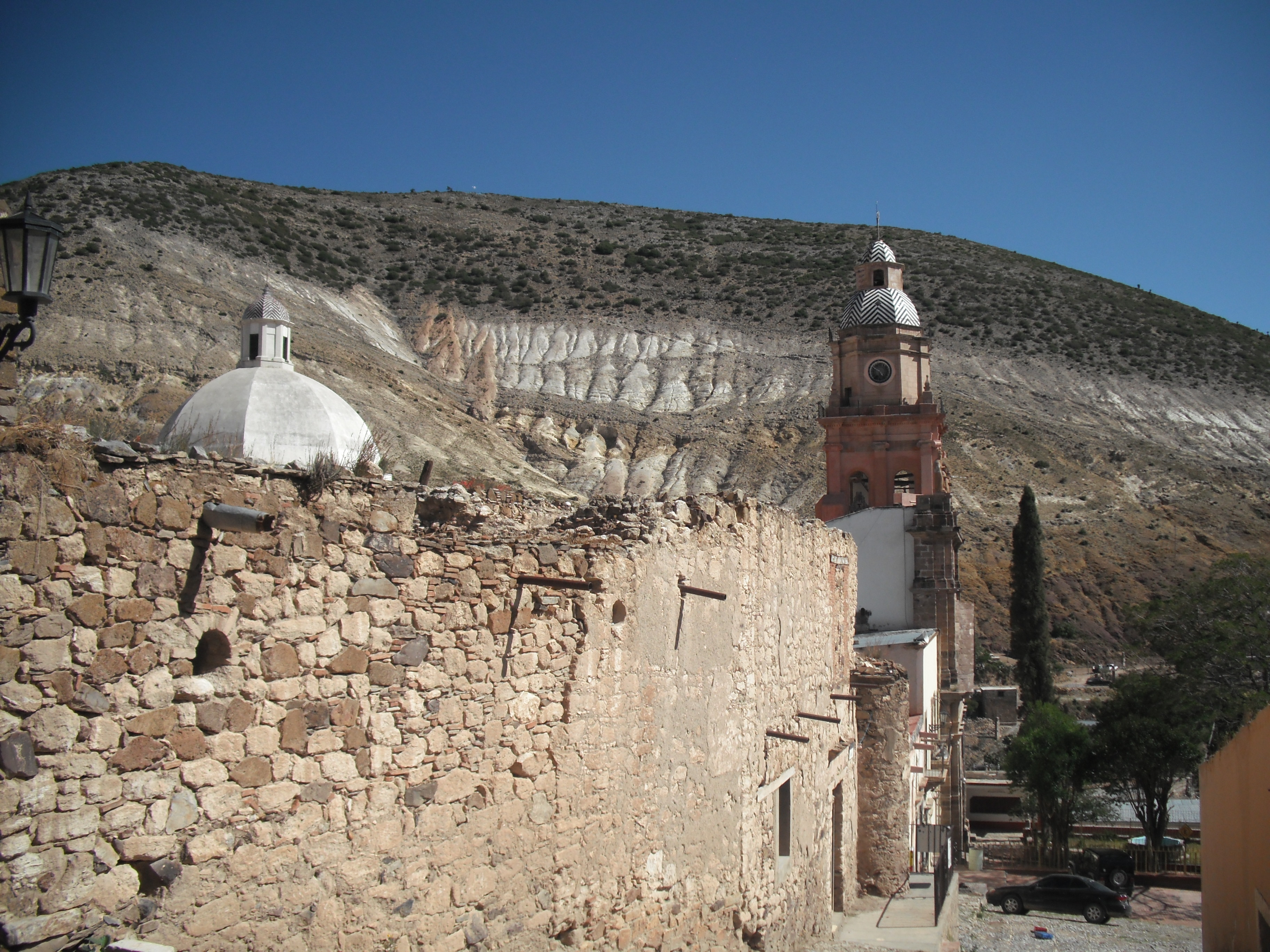
Templo de la Purisima Concepcion, a parish church containing a reputedly miraculous image of St. Francis

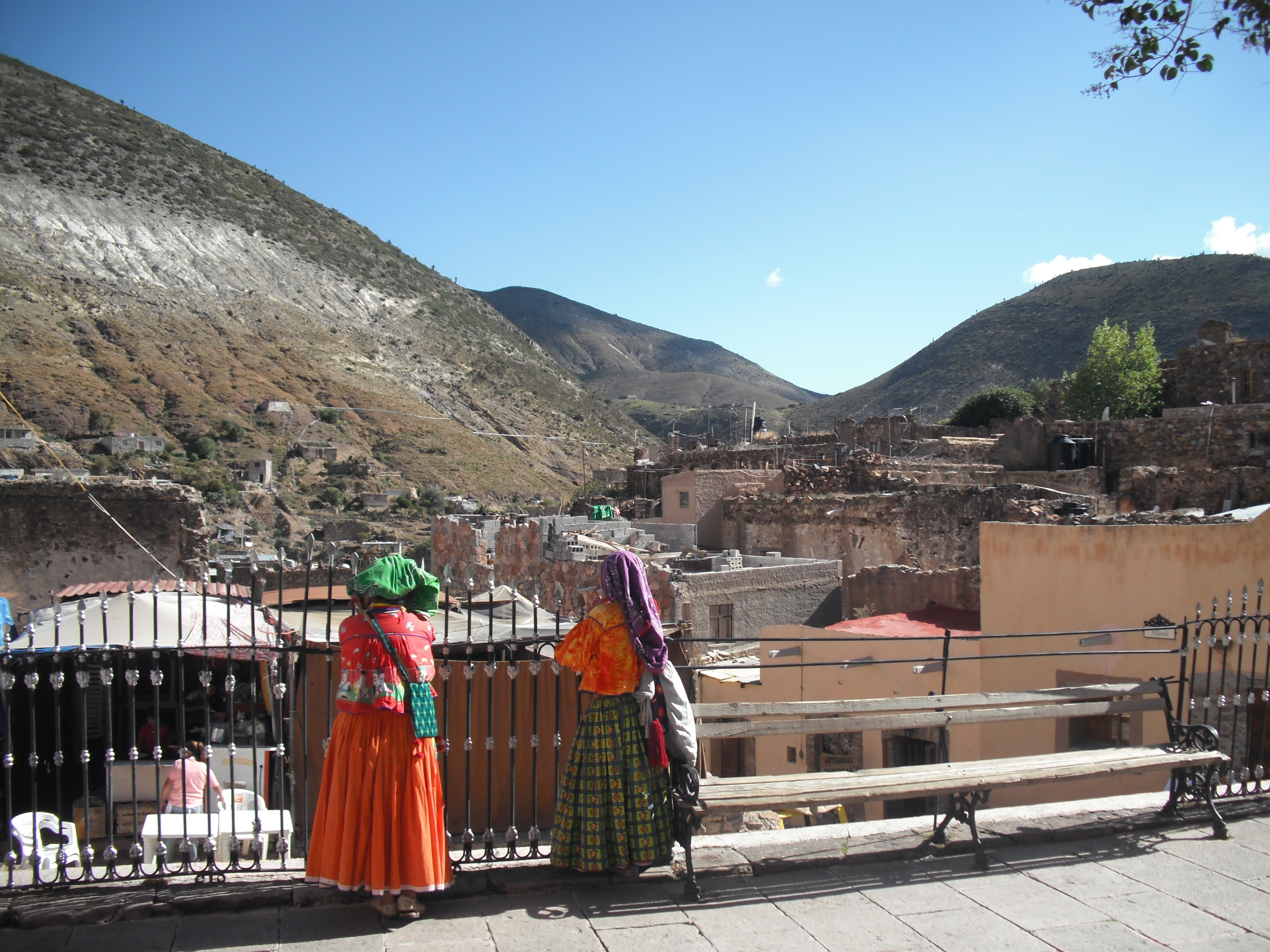
Huichol women in the Plaza Hidalgo

Thousands of pilgrims visit the Parish of Immaculate Conception the week around the feast day of St. Francis of Assisi on October 4 to express their gratitude for favors granted. Inside the church are hundreds of Retablos attesting to the miracles that have been performed.

Wixárika (Huichol) indigenous peoples walk across miles of desert from Nayarit, Durango, Jalisco and Zacatecas to visit the valley of Catorce every spring to leave religious offerings at the "Cerro Quemado", a ceremonial center to the east of their mystical religious territory. Quemado is, according to their ancestral beliefs, the birthplace of their "Tatewari" or Grandfather Fire.

During this time, they also visit the Wirikuta or desert below Real de Catorce to gather a year's supply of sacred nourishment in the form of peyote or "hikuri", the magical cactus that they use to guide their path and consciousness. Though found throughout the region, the cacti in the Wirikuta purportedly produce the most desired crop.

At other times of the year, there is a pilgrimage of people of all ages and nationalities. They travel thousands of miles to arrive at this sacred site and experience communion with the "magical" cactus. So much so, that the government has mounted a campaign to protect the cactus from these so-called "peyote tourists". It is illegal for anyone but Huichol Indians to gather, or possess, the peyote cactus.

Others come to Real de Catorce for health reasons. At almost 9,000 feet (2,700 m) the city is an excellent training ground for bicyclists and runners.

Although in the southern range of the Chihuahuan desert, due to its elevation, Real can be very cool at night. Although days, particularly in summer, can be very hot, it is advised to always bring a jacket, even in summer.

Real de Catorce was named a "Pueblo Mágico" in 2001.

== Gallery ==
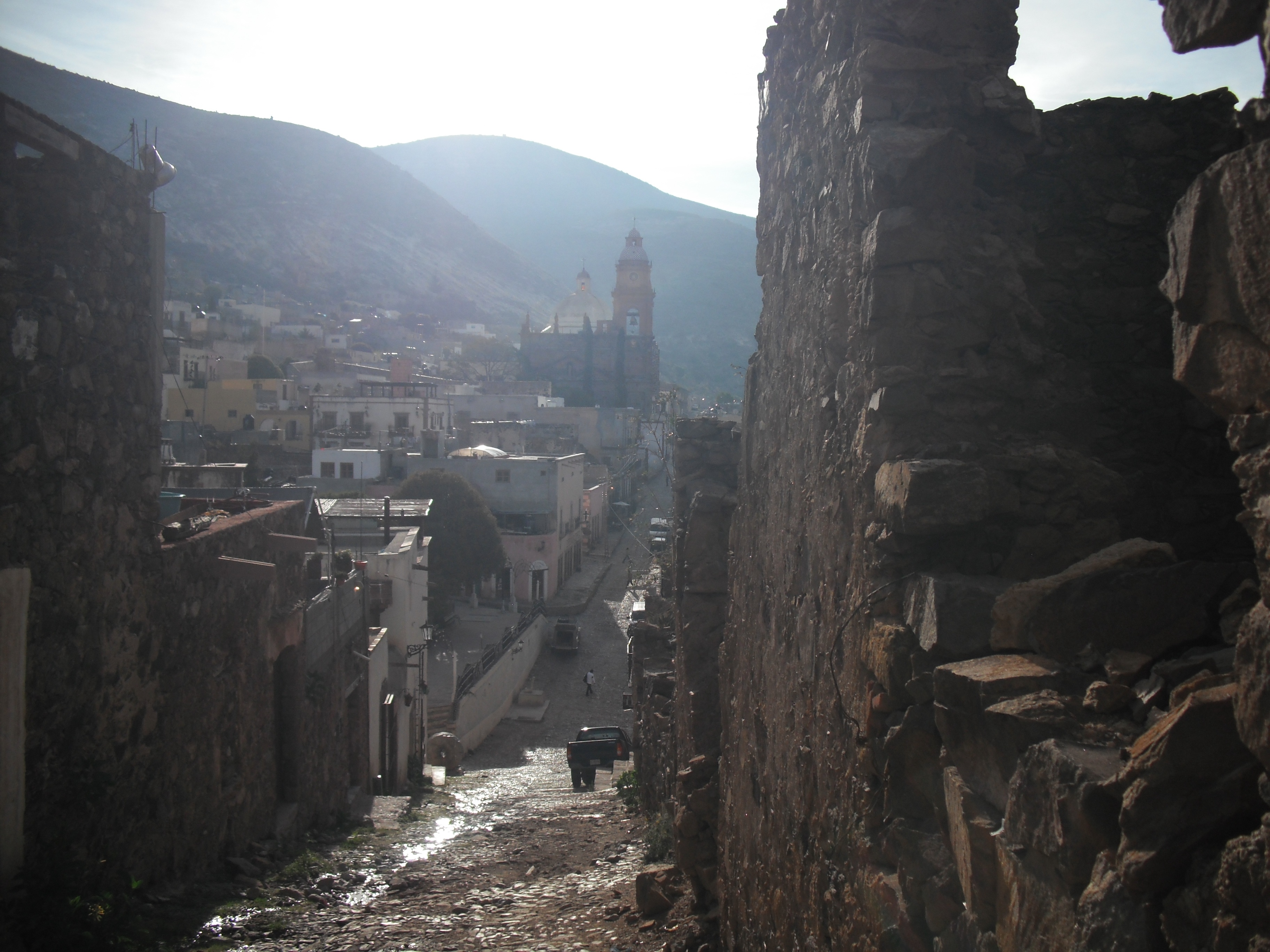
Calle Constitución, the town's main street

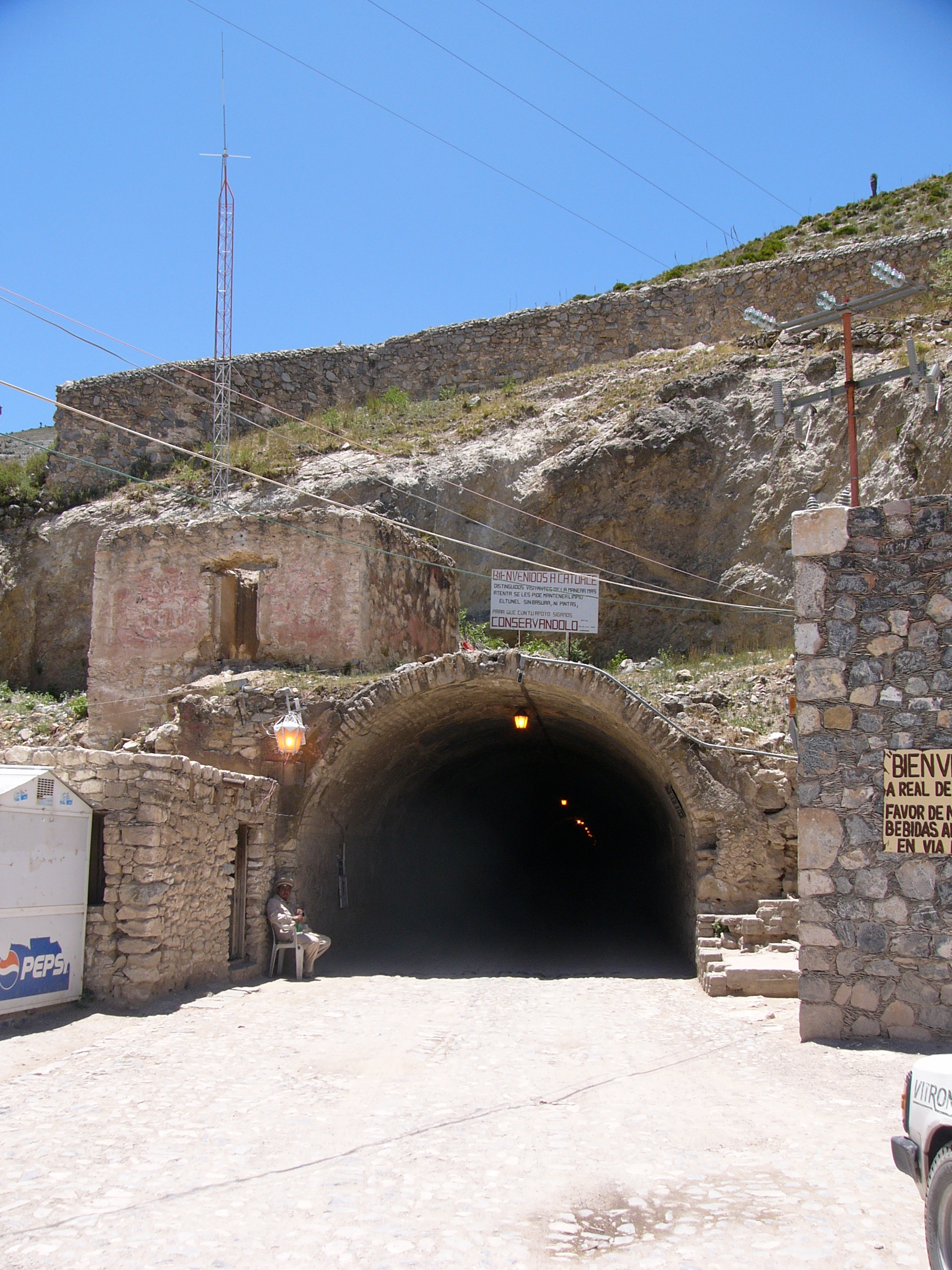
The eastern facing tunnel entrance to Real de Catorce
