= Huichol =

Indigenous people of Mexico

Wixárika (Huichol)
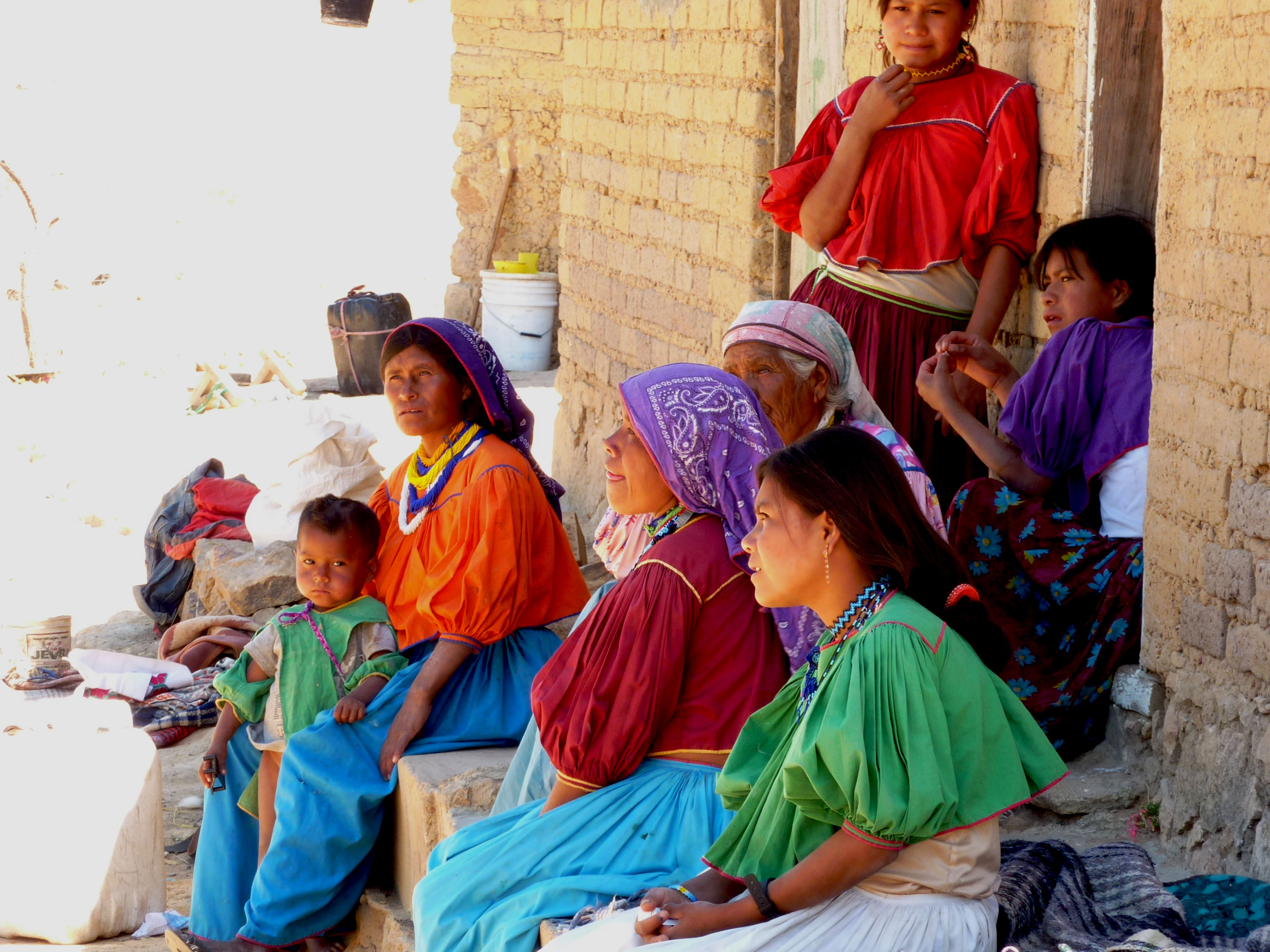
- Wixárika women and children

Total population
- 43 929 in 2003

Regions with significant populations
- Mexico (Sierra of Nayarit, Jalisco, Durango, and the desert of Zacatecas and San Luis Potosi), United States (California, Arizona, New Mexico, and Texas)

Languages
- Wixárika, Spanish, English

Religion
- Shamanism, Animism, Peyotism, Jehovah Witness, Roman Catholicism

Related ethnic groups
- Cora, Tepehuán, Tarahumara, Hopi, other Uto-Aztecan-speaking peoples

The Wixárika (Huichol pronunciation: [wiˈraɾika]) or Huichol (Spanish pronunciation: [ˈwit͡ʃo̞l]) are an Indigenous people of Mexico living in the Sierra Madre Occidental range in the states of Nayarit, Jalisco, Zacatecas, and Durango, with considerable communities in the United States, in the states of California, Arizona, New Mexico, and Texas. They are best known to the larger world as the Huichol, although they refer to themselves as Wixáritari ("the people") in their Huichol language. The adjectival form of Wixáritari and name for their own language is Wixárika.

The Wixárika speak a language of the Corachol group that is closely related to the Nahuan group. Furthermore, they have received Mesoamerican influences, which is reflected by the fact that Wixarika has features typical of the Mesoamerican language area.

Their spirituality traditionally involves collecting and consuming peyote (Lophophora williamsii), a cactus that possesses hallucinogenic effects due to its psychoactive alkaloids, such as mescaline.

== Location ==
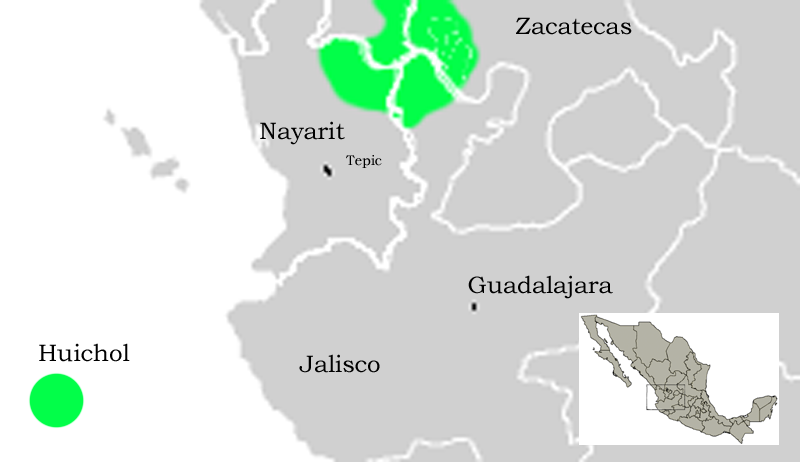
Location of the Huichols in western Mexico

The Wixárika say that, for the most part, they originated in the state of San Luis Potosí, as well as in other parts of Mexico and the United States. Once yearly, some Wixárika journey back to San Luís, their ancestral homeland, to perform Mitote Peyote (Hikuri, in Wixarika) ceremonies.

The three main Wixárika communities belong to the municipality of Mezquitic, Jalisco and are called San Sebastián Teponohuastlan (Wautüa in Huichol), Santa María Cuexcomatitlán (Tuapuri in Huichol) and San Andrés Cohamiata (Tatei Kié in Huichol). Other Wixarika communities include Guadalupe Ocotán (in Nayarit), and Santa Catarina and Tuxpán de Bolaños (Kuruxi Manúwe in Huichol) in Jalisco. Some 13,000 live in other places within Mexico and the United States (California, Arizona, New Mexico, and Texas). Still others live in La Sierra de La Yesca.

== History ==
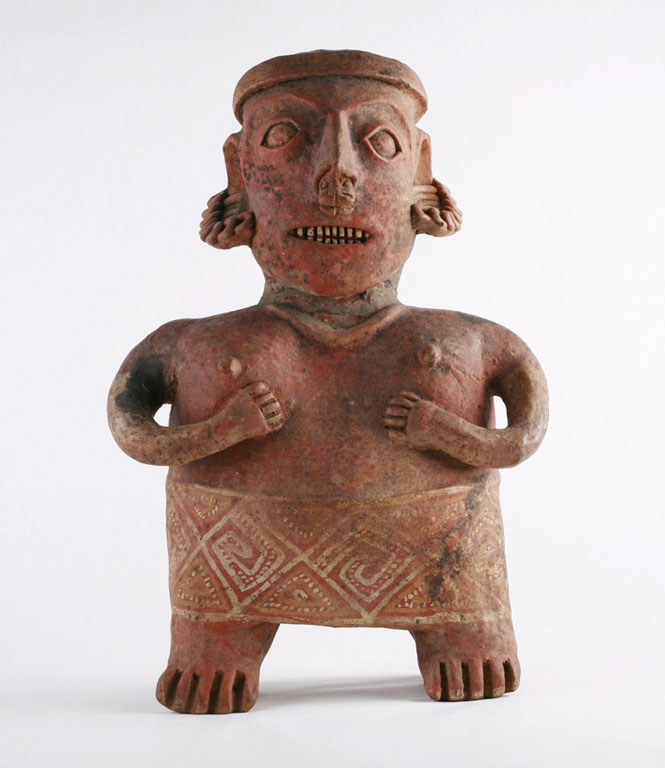
A Nayarit tomb figure in the permanent collection of The Children's Museum of Indianapolis.

The Wixárika arrived in the Bolaños Canyon region after the arrival of the Tepehuanes. There are numerous theories among anthropologists and historians about the timing of the arrival of this ethnic group in the region, but according to Wixárika oral history, when they arrived in the region they currently consider home, the region was already inhabited by another ethnic group. Tepecano oral history also confirms that villages currently inhabited by Wixárika, such as Santa Catarina, were Tepecano villages in the past. In addition, there exists no story of conquest or domination of the Wixárika by the Tepecanos regarding the origin of Wixárika. All that is known currently is that they come from the region of San Luis Potosí and that before their migration to the Bolaños Canyon region, they considered themselves part of the Guachichil ethnic group. Central to the traditional religion of the Wixárika is the gathering of hikuri (a hallucinogenic cactus) in the place that they call Wirikuta, located in the region of Real de Catorce in the state of San Luis Potosí. Hikuri does not grow in the region of Wixárika, but it is abundant in San Luis Potosí territory, which was at the center of the dominion of the Guachichiles before the arrival of the Spaniards. The Guachichiles were known to be bellicose and fiercely defensive of their territory. It is unlikely that the Guachichiles would have let the Wixárika pass peacefully through their territory to gather peyote unless they recognized them as part of their own ethnic group. This is confirmed by oral history of Wixárika, as well as the similarity between the language of Wixárika and the extinct language of the Guachichiles compared to their present neighbors, the Cora.

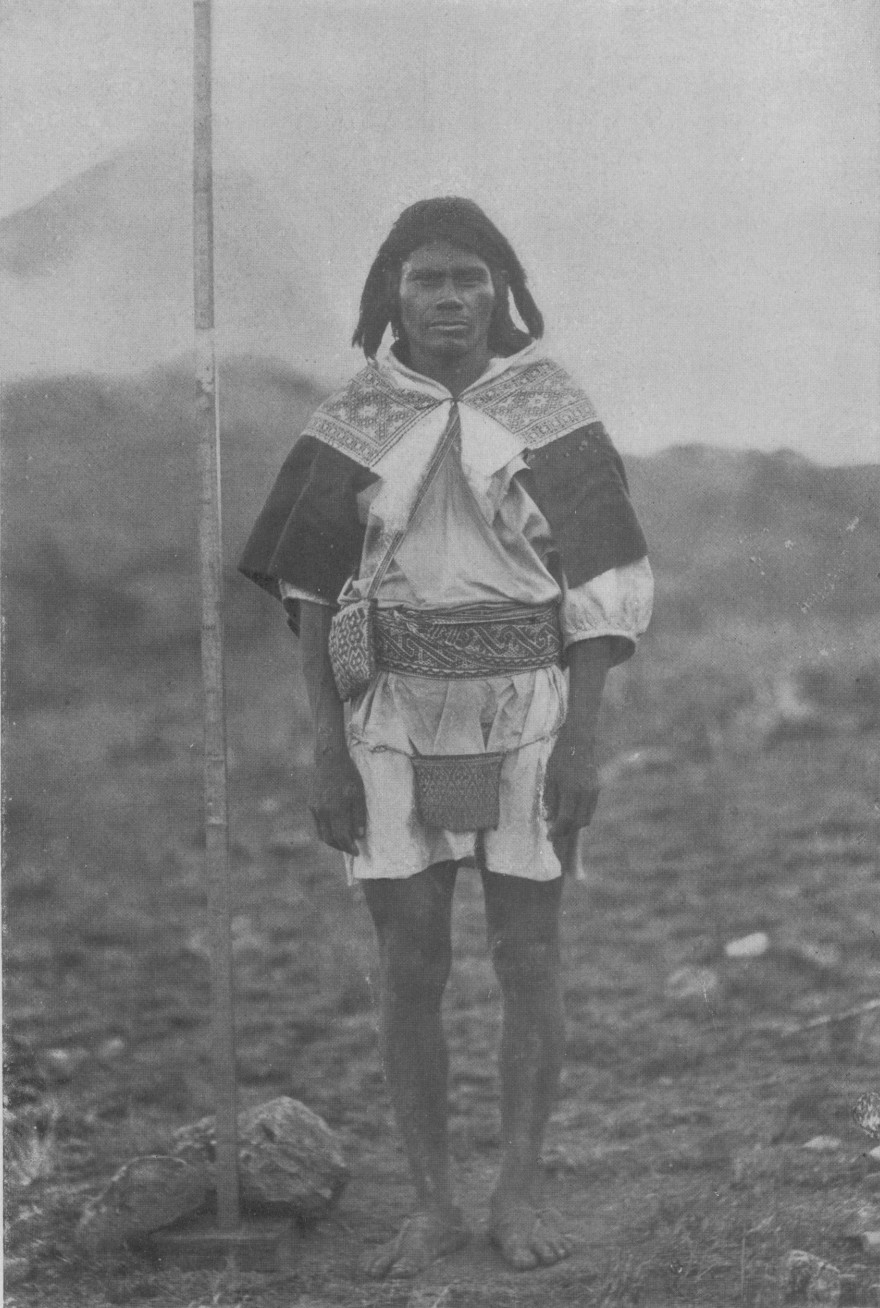
A Huichol man in everyday attire (c. 1898)

Historical documents indicate that during the 16th century, the Wixárika had already arrived in the region that is today northern Jalisco. The writings of Alonso Ponce, which date from the year 1587, indicate that the province of Tepeque was inhabited by an ethnic group who used to unite with the Guachichiles to carry out attacks and incursions on Spanish settlements and caravans. The Spaniards who explored the region that later became Jerez wrote that there were groups of Guachichiles in the region that had pushed out the Zacatecas that had previously resided there. Through this historical evidence one can postulate that the Wixárika arrived in the Bolaños Canyon region around the same time as the Spaniards. The arrival of the Spaniards in territories of the Guachichiles in Zacatecas and San Luis Potosí had certainly brought epidemics to the Indigenous communities whose members had no resistance to the diseases of Europe. In addition, those Natives who survived the epidemics suffered due to the concentrations and encomiendas carried out by the Spaniards in order to work the recently discovered mines of the region. These experiences are also documented in the oral history of Wixáritari.

The Wixárika arrived in the Bolaños Canyon region looking for refuge and settled among the established Tepecano settlements there. Some likely intermarried with the Tepecano and shared cultural practices, such as using chimales, or woods of oration, and the use of peyote as a sacrament. The two nations jointly defended themselves against Spanish incursions and rebelled against the Spanish colonial government. There is historical evidence of a rebellion mounted jointly by the Wixárika and Tepecano in El Teúl in 1592 and another one in Nostic in 1702.

The Tecual ethnicity, which lived around Xalisco and Ahuacatlán in Nayarit, is thought to have been related to or even a subgroup of the Huichol.

== Language ==
The Huichol language, Wixarika, is a Uto-Aztecan language (Corachol branch) related to Cora. Huichol words conform to four patterns according to their inflection: type I words, principally verbs, are inflected for person and mode, and type II words, principally nouns, are capable of being inflected for number and possession. Type III words include quantifiers and are inflected for case and optionally for gender and person. Type IV words are uninflected. Huichol major sentence types include transitive, intransitive, complemented transitive, and complemented. Complemented sentences contain object-like constituents, termed complements. True objects do not stand in cross reference with any affix in the verbal. Complements include quotative phrases and direct objects of double transitive sentences. Huichol minor sentence types are vocatives and exclamations.

== Lifestyle ==
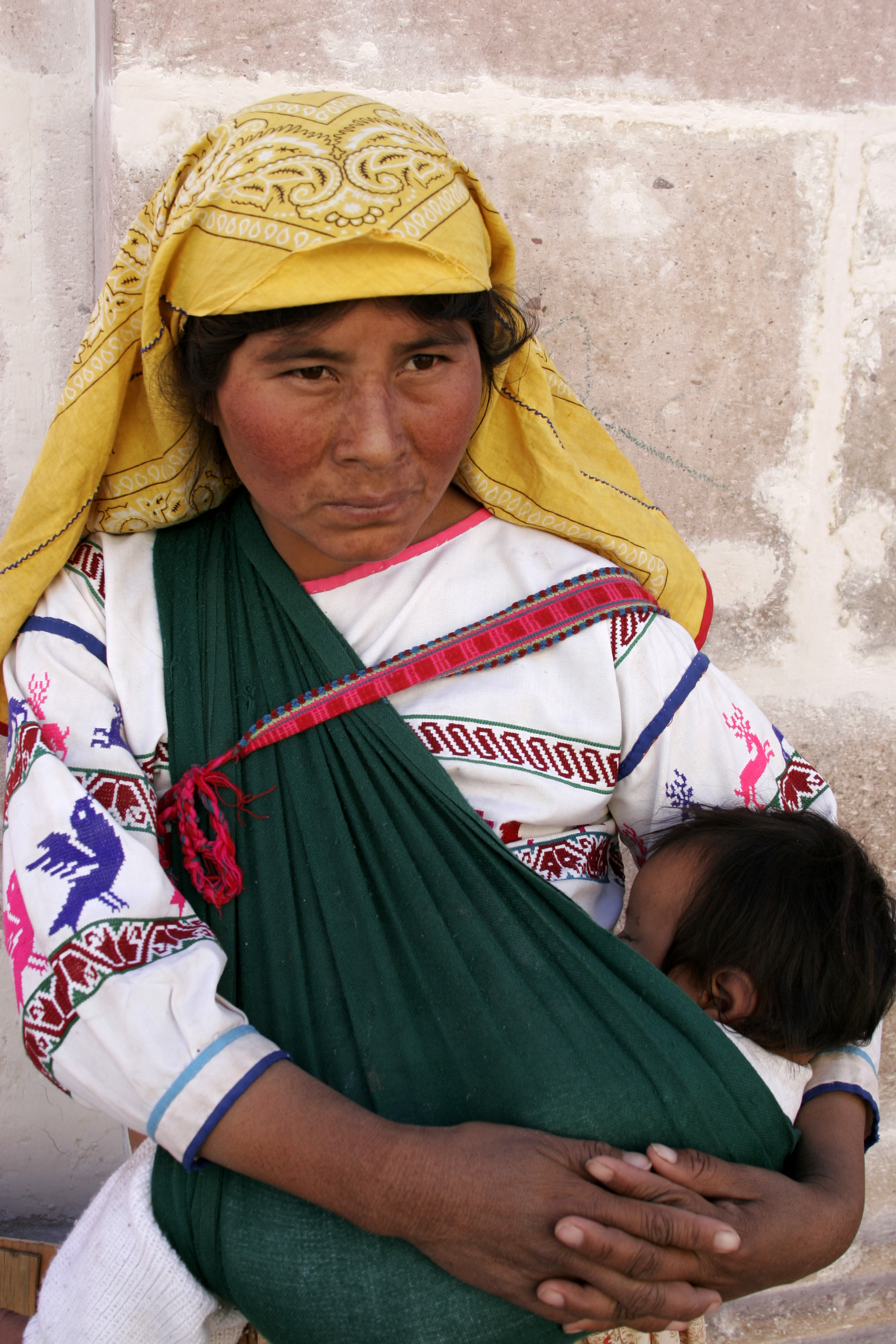
Photo of Huichol woman and child.

In summer, when the rain comes, they live on their ranchos (farms) in tiny rancherias (hamlets) and make cheese from the milk from their cattle, which they slaughter and eat usually only during celebrations. For the most part, their diet consists of tortillas, made from the Blue, Red, Yellow or White Sacred corn, beans, rice and pasta, the occasional chicken or pig (from which they make chicharrones), chili peppers, supplemented with wild fruits and vegetables of the region, such as colorines, a legume gathered from trees, or ciruelas (Spondias purpurea) and guayabas (guavas).

Marriages are arranged by the parents when the children are very young. Huichol usually marry between the ages of fourteen and seventeen. Extended Huichol families live together in rancho settlements. These small communities consist of individual houses which belong to a nuclear family. Each settlement has a communal kitchen and the family shrine, called a xiriki, which is dedicated to the ancestors of the rancho. The buildings surround a central patio. The individual houses are traditionally built of stone or adobe with grass-thatched roofs.

A district of related ranchos is known as a temple district. Temple districts are all members of a larger community district. Each community district is ruled by a council of kawiterutsixi, elder men who are usually also shamans.

Crafts of the Huichol include embroidery, Beadwork, sombreros (hats), archery equipment, prayer arrows, and weaving, as well as cuchuries, woven or embroidered bags.

The Huichol seek autonomy in their land, but have two governments, one native to the Huichol and one answering to the Mexican Government through "Municipal Agents" in the larger settlements. The government has established schools without much success in the Huichol Zone during the last 40 years, both church and state. A private Junior High School has led to some friction between "Town" and "Gown" among members of the tribe. Friction also exists between converts to Christianity.

With the building of roads in the Huichol Zone in the last ten years, new influences are impacting the social fabric of the Huichol. Where mules, horses and burros used to be the main forms of transport, trucks are becoming more prominent, importing food, medicines, and beer. Although this of course can be beneficial, it was also degrading to the culture as a whole. In 1986, the Huichols continued to live isolated lives very traditionally in every aspect, but since this contact from within their own country, they have had to adapt and change to be more modern.

== Religion and mythology ==
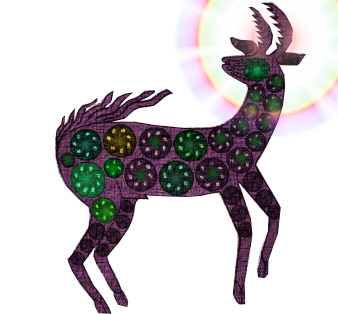
Representation of the god Kauyumari (Blue Deer)

Their religion consists of four principal deities: the trinity of Corn, Blue Deer and Peyote, and the Eagle, all descended from their Sun God, Tao Jreeku. Most Huichols retain their traditional beliefs.

- The "Huichol think that two opposed cosmic forces exist in the world : an igneous one represented by Tayaupá, Our Father the Sun, and an aquatic one, represented by Nacawé, the Rain Goddess." "The eagle-stars, our Father's luminous creatures, hurl themselves into the lagoons and ... Nacawé's water serpents ... rise into the skies to shape the clouds".

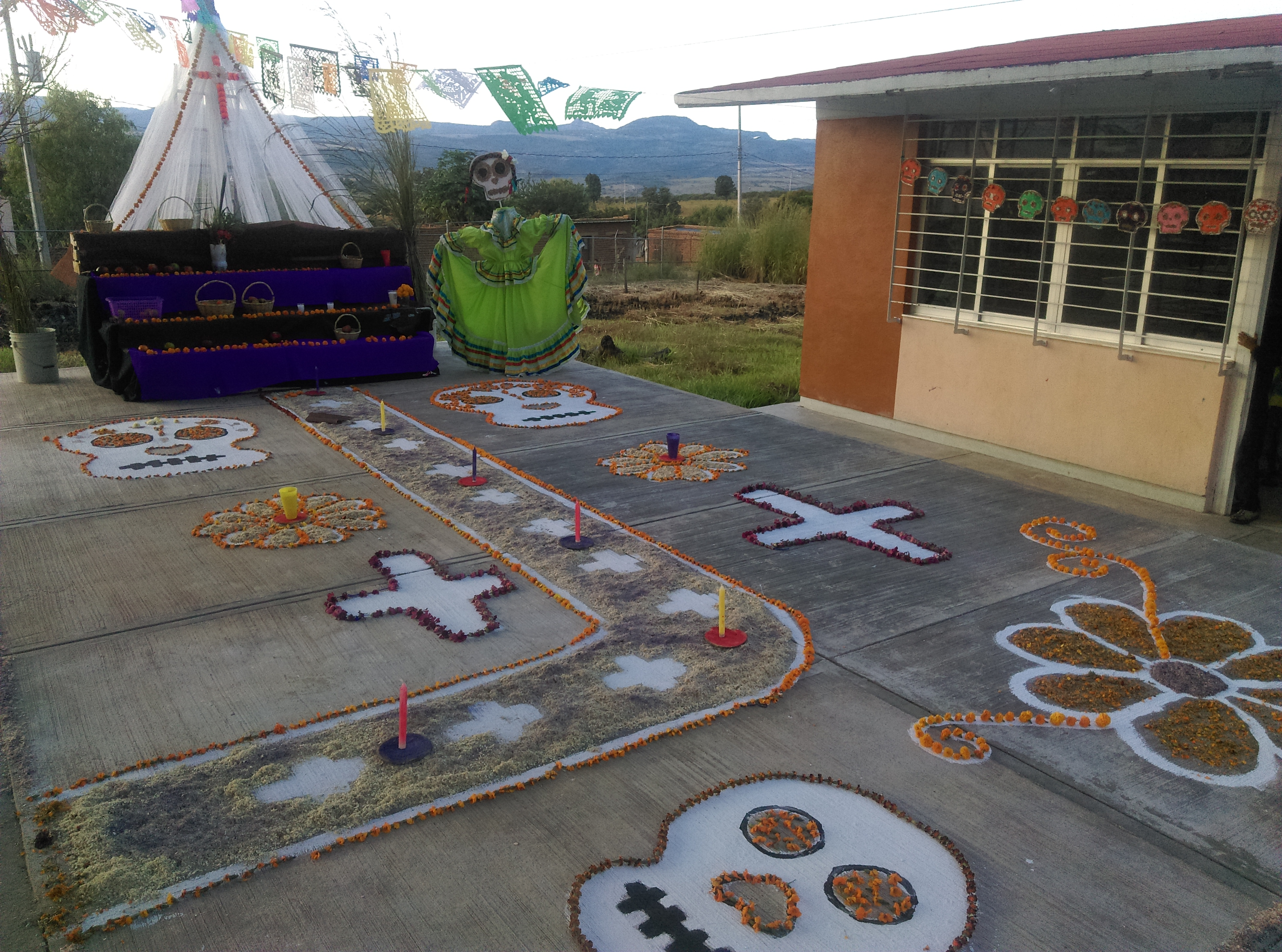
Altar of the dead in wixarika school.

- "According to Huichol [belief], the Sun created earthly beings with his saliva, which appeared in the shape of red foam on the surface of the ocean's waves." "New things are born from "hearts" or essences, which the Huichol see in the red sea foam that flowed from Our Father the Sun ... . The Sun itself has a "heart" that is its forerunner. It adopts the shape of a bird, the tau kúkai. The bird came out of the underworld and placed a cross on the ocean. Father Sun was born, climbed up the cross, ... in this way killing the world's darkness with his blows".
- "Kacíwalí is ... maize goddess. The wind carried her to the top of a mountain, which was given to her as a dwelling". "Kacíwalí's rain serpents are changed into fish".
- "Komatéame is ... goddess ... of midwives. Both she and Otuanáka [another goddess] have tiny children in human shape, male and female". "Stuluwiákame has the responsibility to give humans children, and Na'alewáemi ... gives animals their young".
- Tatéi Kükurü 'Uimari ... Our Mother Dove Girl, who was also mother of the boy who became the Sun.
- Tatéi Wérika ... associated with the Sun and often depicted as a two-headed eagle.
- Tatéi Niwetükame ... patroness of children, who determines the sex of a child before it is born and gives it its soul (kupuri).

=== Peyote ===
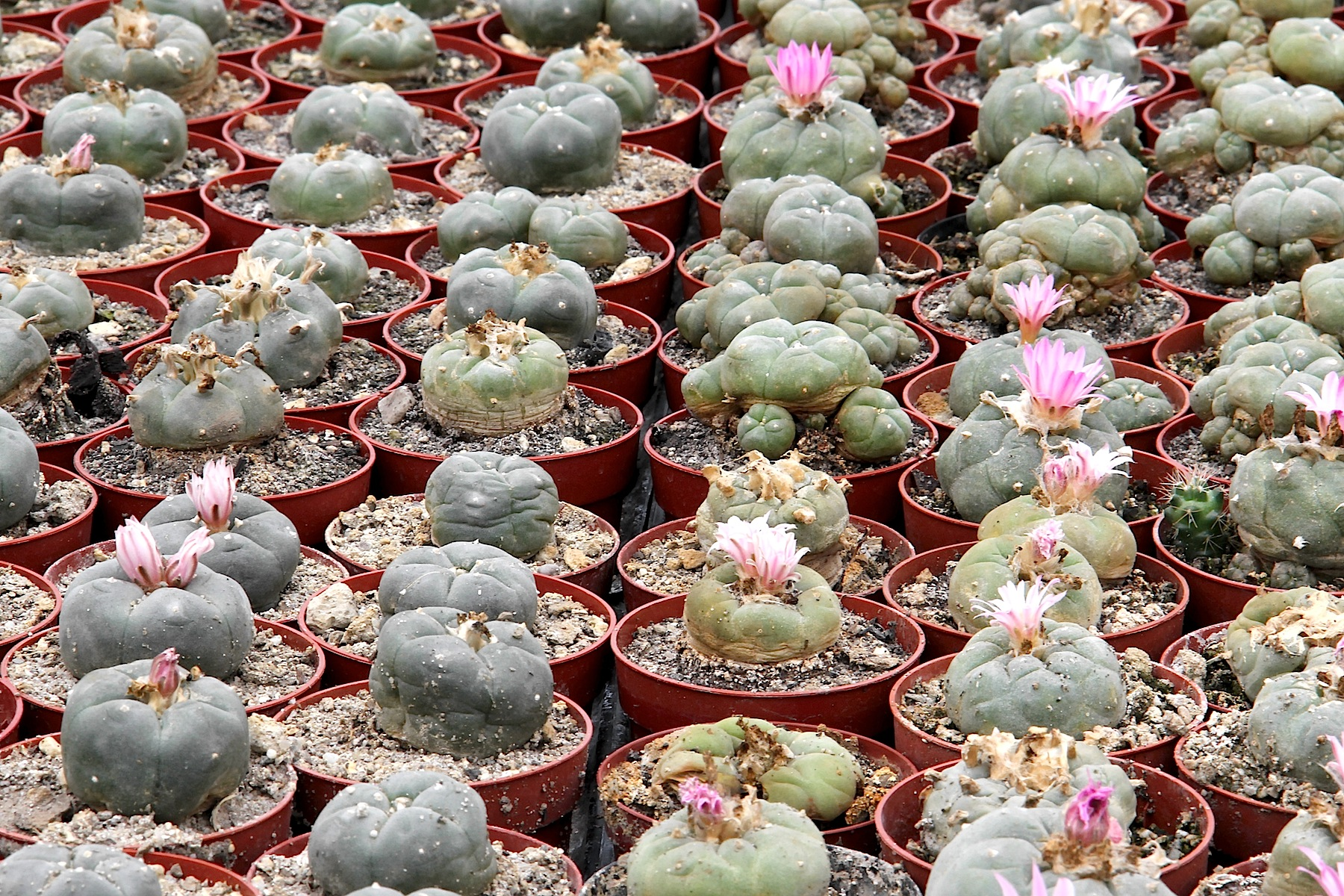
Lophophora williamsii pm 2

Like many Indigenous American groups, Huichols have traditionally used the peyote (hikuri) cactus in religious rituals. Huichol practices seem to reflect pre-Columbian practices particularly accurately. These rituals involve singing, weeping, and contact with ancestor spirits. "It is Wirikuta, where the Huichol go each year to collect peyote." "Before reaching Wirikúta, their final destination, they pass by the sacred springs of Tatéi Matiniéri ("Where Our Mother Lives"), the house of the eastern rain goddess. They cross steppes. The first one is the Cloud Gate; the second, Where the Clouds Open." This pilgrimage takes place annually as a desire to return to where life originated and heal oneself. The Huichols assume roles of gods along the trail that they usually take by foot. Upon arrival in Wirikuta, the hunt begins and the first cactus that is found is shared among everyone. Then they harvest enough peyote for the year (since they only make the trip one time every year). After the work is done, they eat enough peyote (a hallucinogen) to have visions. Because of the visions and effects of the plant, the shaman is alleged by the Huichols to be able to speak to the gods and ensure the regeneration of the Huichols' souls.

==== Mexican government protection ====
Huichol rituals involve the hallucinogenic cactus known as peyote. Due to the desire to use this traditional plant recreationally (in the wake of Carlos Castaneda's books' undesired publicity), the Mexican government, with the help of international organizations, has passed laws allowing for its use in religious practices only and any other use or possession can be a crime worthy of ten to twenty-five years in prison. Indigenous people find it increasingly difficult to harvest their sacred plant and they have had to ask for intervention from the Mexican government to protect a section of their trail. As Pedro Medellin, the head of a government, wrote in a study on peyote distribution in Huichol sacred areas, "If peyote disappears, then their whole culture disappears."

=== Animism ===
Through their ceremonies, Huichols interact with the primal ancestor spirits of fire, deer, and other elements of the natural world. "A newborn, separated from its umbilical cord, will still have ... the agave plant where the cord was buried. When children grow up they need to obtain cuttings from their protector so that they can bury their children's umbilical cords under them". The "Huichol ... keep ... the souls of ancestors who have returned to the world in the shape of rock crystals."

== Art ==
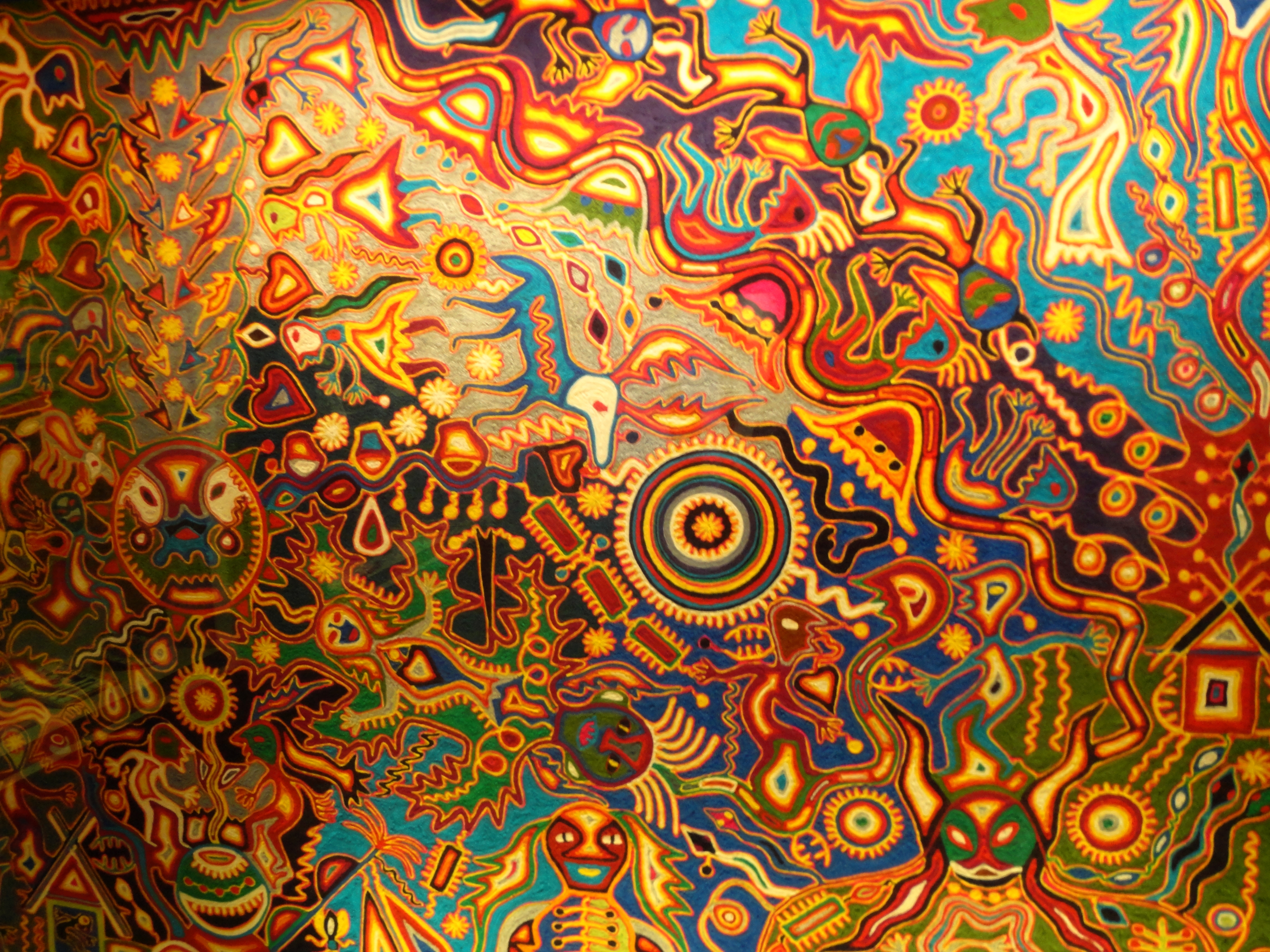
Huichol yarn painting

In traditional Huichol communities, an important ritual artifact is the nieli'ka: a small square or round tablet with a hole in the center covered on one or both sides with a mixture of beeswax and pine resin into which threads of yarn are pressed. Nieli'kas are found in most Huichol sacred places such as house shrines (xiriki), temples, springs, and caves.

In the past thirty years, about four thousand Huichols have migrated to cities, primarily Tepic, Nayarit, Guadalajara and Mexico City. It is these urbanized Huichols who have drawn attention to their rich culture through their art. To preserve their ancient beliefs they have begun making detailed and elaborate yarn paintings, a development and modernization of the nieli'ka.

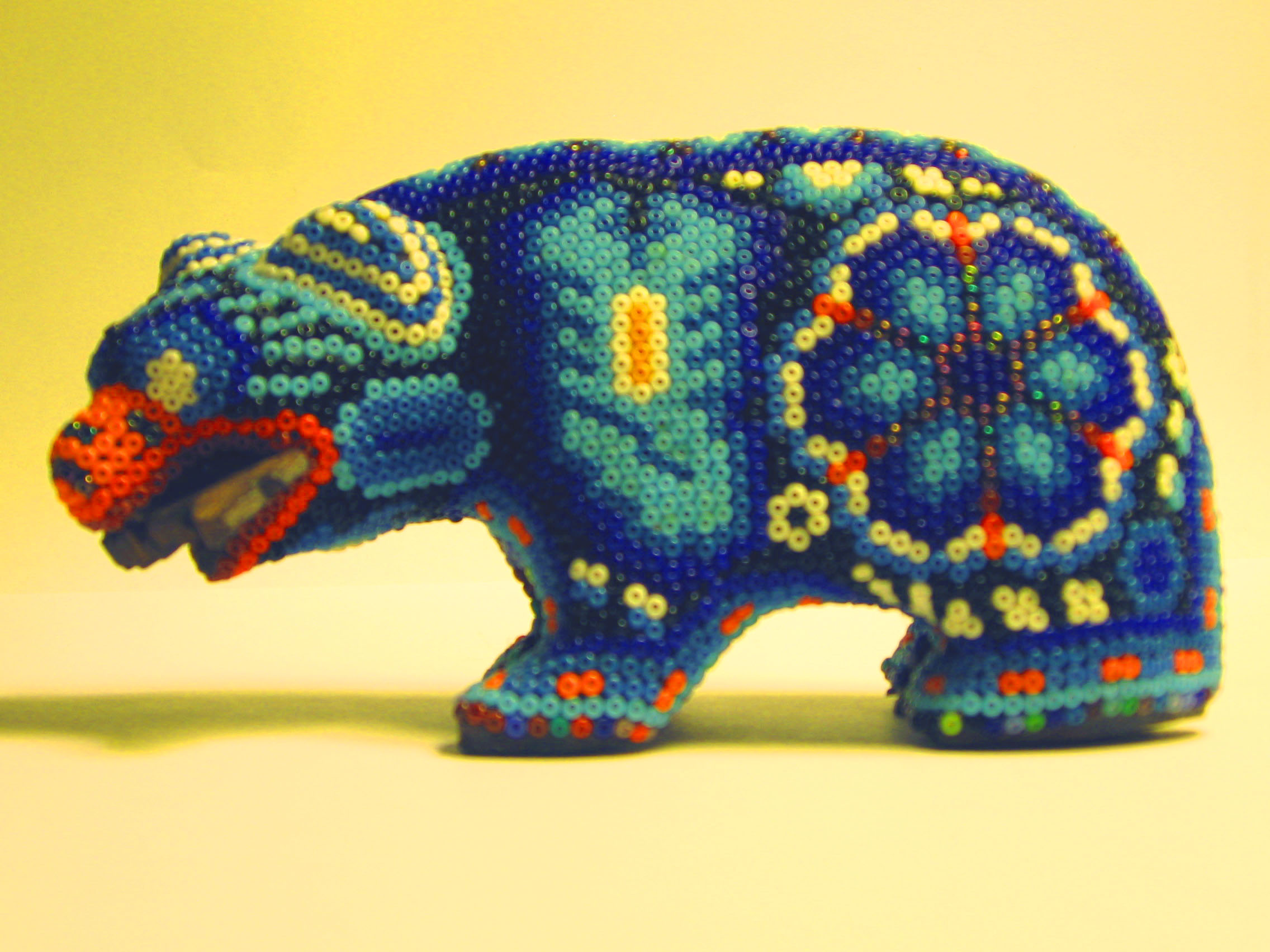
This blue beaded Huichol art bear depicts symbols of peyote, scorpion, and corn.

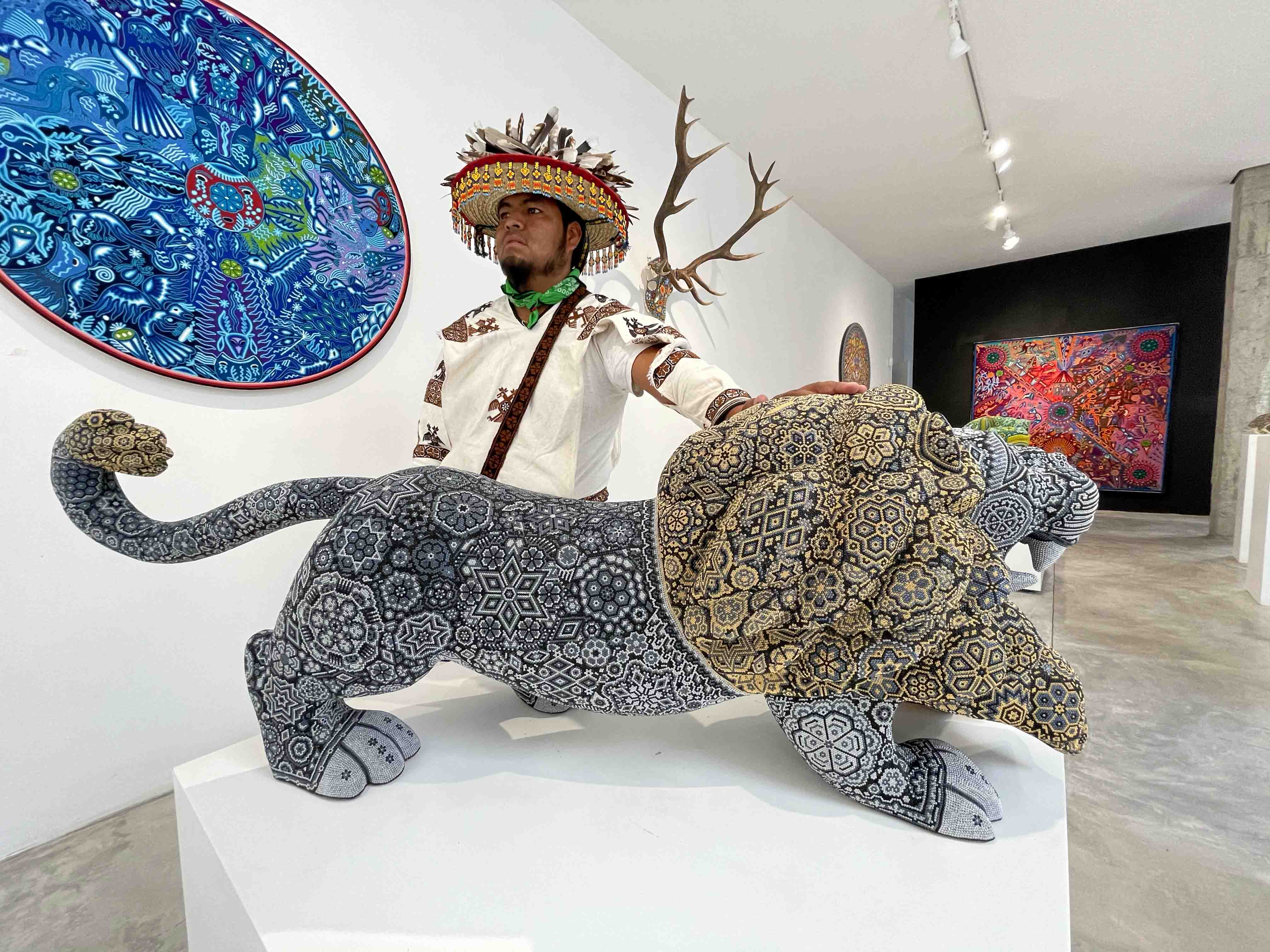
Wixarika artist with a big lion sculpture covered with crystal beads.

For the Huichol however, yarn painting is not only an aesthetic or commercial art form; the symbols in these paintings are sprung out of Huichol culture and its shamanistic traditions. From the small beaded eggs and jaguar heads to the modern detailed yarn paintings in psychedelic colors, each is related to a part of Huichol tradition and belief. In more modern times they have been able to develop these art forms in ways they could not before. The colors and intricacy of the yarn and materials for beads are more readily available to make more detailed and colorful pieces of art. Previously, beaded art was made with bone, seeds, jade, ceramics, or other like materials when now the Huichols have access to glass beads of multiple colors. The modern yarn that Huichols use is woven much tighter and is thinner allowing for great detail and the colors are commercial allowing for much more variety. Before access to these materials in cities, Huichols used vegetable dyes.

The first large yarn paintings were exhibited in Guadalajara in 1962 which were simple and traditional. At present with the availability of a larger spectrum of commercial dyed and synthetic yarn, more finely spun yarn paintings have evolved into high quality works of art.

The beaded art is a relatively new innovation and is constructed using glass, plastic or metal beads pressed onto a wooden form covered in beeswax. Common bead art forms include masks, bowls and figurines. Like all Huichol art, the bead work depicts the prominent patterns and symbols featured in the Huichol religion.

Some Huichol shaman-artists have acquired some fame and commercial success: the acclaimed Huichol yarn painter José Benítez Sánchez has had an exposition of his works in the USA.

== Current issues ==
=== Religious freedom ===
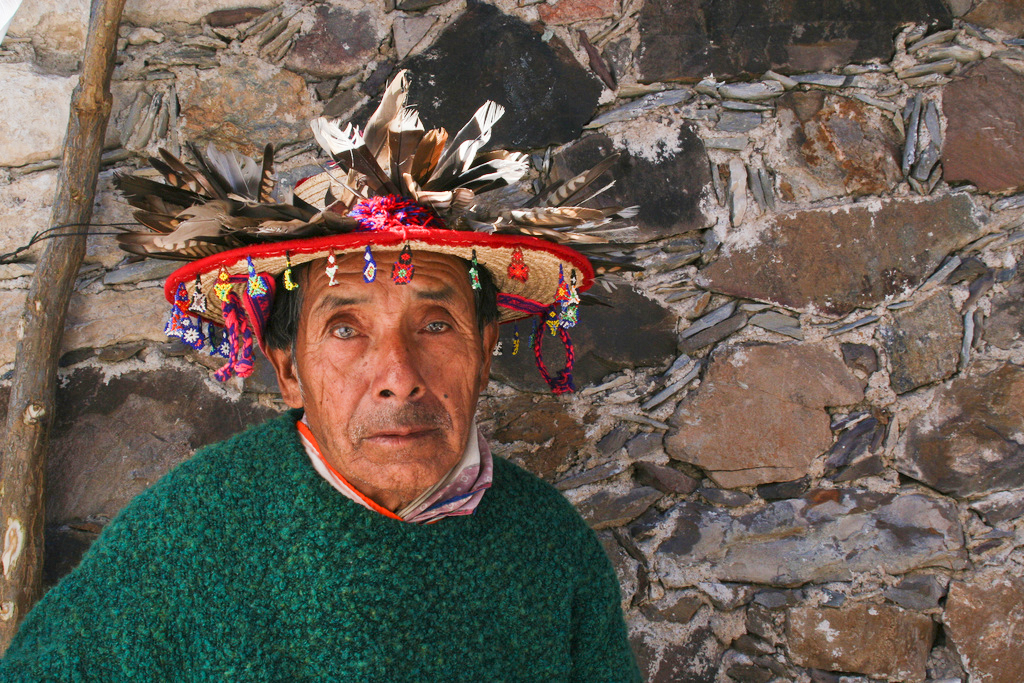
Huichol mara'akame (shaman).

Wixaritari are relatively well known among anthropologists for their long tradition of rejecting Catholic influences and continuing traditional Shamanistic practices. Indeed, Wixaritari, along with the Lacandons and other ethnic minorities in the country, have fought for their religious and cultural freedom since the arrival of the Spanish conquerors. These ethnic minorities are often portrayed as non-existent or as extremely marginal due to the stereotype of Indigenous people in Mexico as fervent Roman Catholics. Wixarika people have also been victims of discrimination, Indigenous rights violations and even been stripped of their lands on the grounds of not sharing the same religious faith. Since a couple of decades ago, Wixarika culture has seen the increasing influence of evangelical Protestants from the United States who, by building churches and helping the community financially, have made their way into Wixarika traditions.

=== Environmental impacts ===
==== Mining ====
On October 27, 2000, one of their sacred mountains, Cerro Quemado (Leunaxü), important in ceremonial migration, peyote hunt, and deer dances, became a United Nations Education, Scientific and Cultural Organization (UNESCO) protected area for its importance as a cultural route and endemic flora and fauna species. On June 9, 2001, the site was declared as a National Sacred Site under the State of San Luis Potosi's Natural Protection Act.

On November 13, 2009, First Majestic Silver, a Canadian silver mining company, decided to purchase Cerro Quemado mineral rights, with 80% of their interest within the protected land.

First Majestic Silver's mining methods include open pit mining and lixiviation through cyanide, using two kilograms of NaCN per tonne of ore. While open pit mining itself removes entire habitats and landscapes, the addition of sodium cyanide, NaCN, is a lethal method requiring only 0.2 grams to kill a person. In April, 2010 the company also opened a new cyanidation plant in Coahuila, Mexico where it has started producing 3500 tons of cyanide a day to help them expand their mining efforts.

The Huicholes tried to find outside groups to help them protect the mountain and thereby their land and culture. In 2011, they called on the President to honor his agreement to protect their holy sites.

On May 26, 2012, before a gathering of 60,000 people at Wirikuta Fest, First Majestic Silver announced it had returned some of their mining concessions to the national mining reserve to protect Wirikuta. However, the Wixarika Regional Council exposed this as a farce.

==== Roads ====
Besides the mining conflicts, the Wixarika community has faced further problems by the construction of a road in Jalisco during 2008. The community has made it clear that the persons involved in the project don't have any rights to use Wixarika lands for whatever end; hence, they are committing violation of internationally recognized Indigenous rights.

== Notable people ==
- José Benítez Sánchez (1938–2009)
- Pascual Díaz y Barreto (1876–1936)
- Claudia Morales Reza
- Santos de la Torre (born 1942)
- Victoriano Huerta former President of Mexico (1913–1914)

== See also ==
- Symphony No. 7 (Glass)
