= Tayoltita =

City in the Mexican state of Durango

- Municipal seat and city
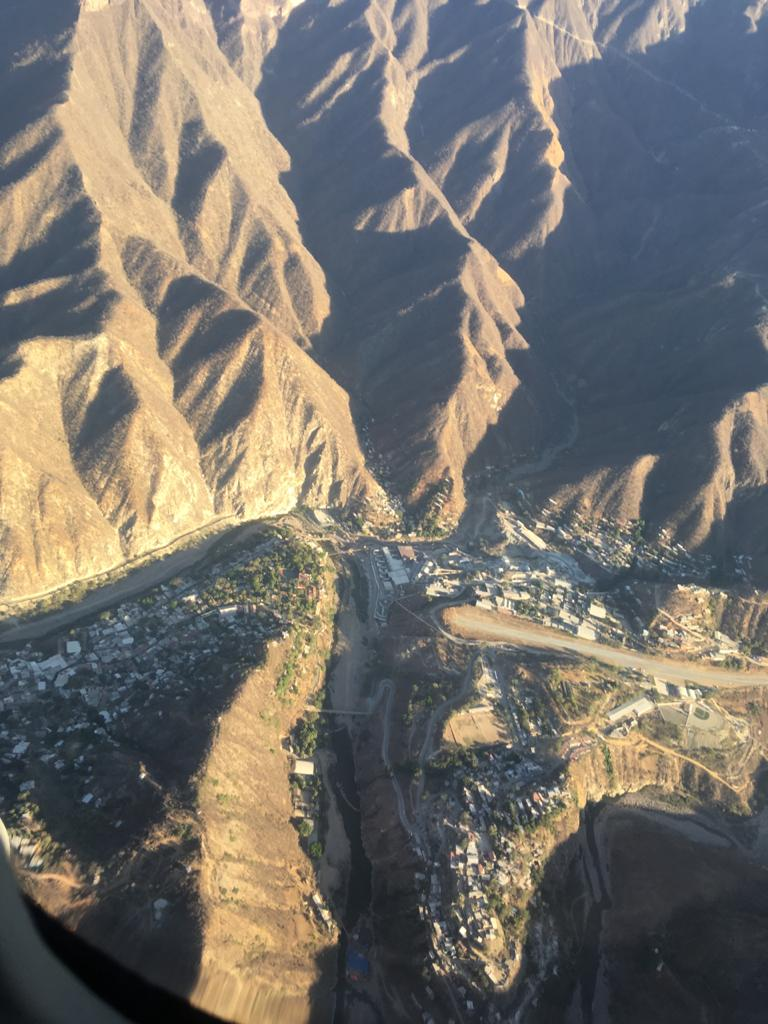

- Location in Durango Location in Mexico
- Coordinates: 24°5′N 105°56′W
- Country: Mexico
- State: Durango
- Municipality: San Dimas

Population (2010)
  - Total: 5,124

Tayoltita is a city and seat of the municipality of San Dimas, in the state of Durango, north-western Mexico. As of 2010, the town had a total population of 5,124.
