= XHVK-FM =

Radio station in Gómez Palacio, Durango

Gómez Palacio, Durango; Mexico
- Broadcast area: Comarca Lagunera
- Frequency: 106.7 FM
- Branding: Pasión FM

Programming
- Format: Romantic

Ownership
- Owner: Radiorama; (Emisoras de Torreón, S.A. de C.V.)
- Operator: GPS Media

History
- First air date: January 23, 1962 (concession); 2011 (FM)
- Former frequencies: 1010 AM

Technical information
- Class: B1
- ERP: 25 kW
- Transmitter coordinates: 25°32′58″N 103°28′07″W

Links
- Webcast: Listen live

XHVK-FM is a radio station on 106.7 FM in Gómez Palacio, Durango. The station is owned by Radiorama and carries a romantic music format known as Pasión.

== History ==
XHVK began as XEVK-AM 1010, with a concession awarded to Emisoras de Torreón, S.A., property of José Luis de la Rosa, on January 23, 1962. Before even going on air, XEVK went on strike, because the National Union of Radio Station Employees wanted a collective contract signed for the new station.

It migrated to FM in 2011 on 106.7 MHz.

XHVK as Vida Romántica to December 2021

As part of the 2017 renewal of XHVK's concession, it was slated to move to 96.7 MHz in the near future in order to clear 106-108 MHz as much as possible for community and indigenous radio stations, however, the station did not change its frequency because the concessionaire never paid the renewal fee, causing the concession to expire. The Vida Romántica brand was dropped for "Pasión" in 2021, remaining in the romantic format.
