= El Zape =

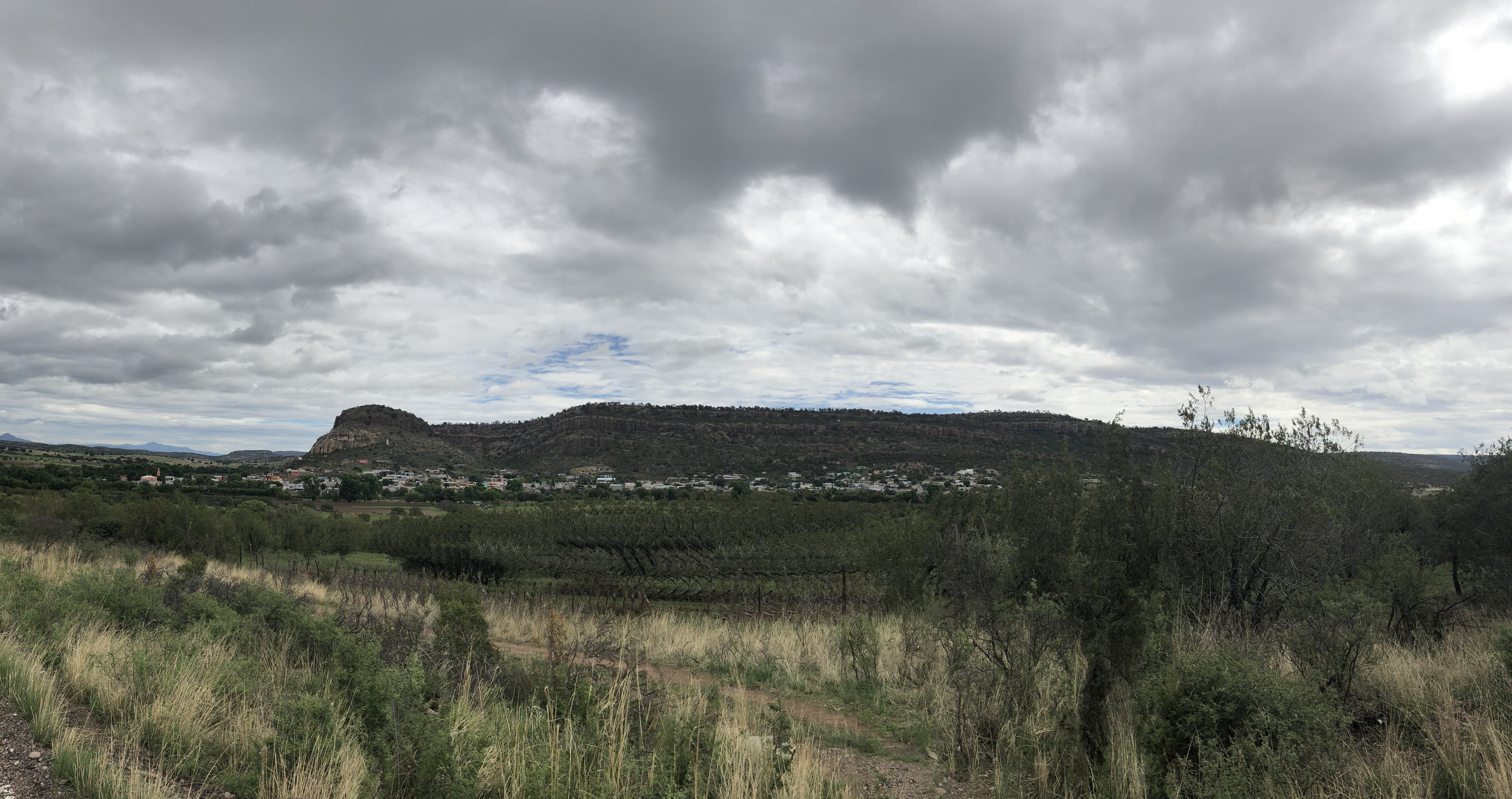
- Skyline of El Zape
- Motto: Tierra de Cultura y Historia (Land of Culture and History)
- Location in Durango Location in Mexico
- Coordinates: 25°46′19.2″N 105°47′20.4″W
- Country: Mexico
- State: Durango
- Municipality: Guanaceví
- Foundation: 1604
- Founder: Juan Fonte

Area
  - Total: 65 km^{2} (25 sq mi)
- Elevation: 1,960 m (6,430 ft)

Population (2020)
  - Total: 412
  - Density: 6.3/km^{2} (16/sq mi)
- Time zone: UTC−6 (CST)
  - Summer (DST): UTC−5 (CDT)
- ZIP Code: 35425
- Area code: 674

El Zape is a small town in the hills of the municipality of Guanaceví, in the state of Durango, in northern México. El Zape is the third largest town in Guanaceví. El Zape postal code is 35425. It is located on the eastern side of the Sierra Madre Occidental, at an altitude of 1960 m (6430 ft).

== History ==
=== Tepehuán arrival and founding of El Zape ===
The region of El Zape was first settled by Thepehuan people. In the late 1500s the Spanish discovered silver in Guanaceví, prompting a rush to settle the region. In 1596, father Jeronimo Ramirez visited the settlement of El Zape. In 1597, he built the mission of San Ignacio de El Zape. Later, in 1604 Father Juan Fonte founded the town of El Zape.

=== Tepehuán Revolt ===
The conditions in which native people lived under colonial rule led them to revolt in 1616, attacking Spanish settlements in what is known as the Thepehuan Revolt. The neighboring residents of Guanaceví donated seeds, tools, and animals to El Zape. During this time the Jesuits increased their efforts to evangelize the children of El Zape. The children were considered clever if they read the Bible and went to church. The Tepehuan people grew corn and sold it to the nearest mines. During that rebellion, El Zape was the site of a massacre that left 19 Spaniards and 60 African slaves dead.

== Climate ==
Climate data for El Zape, Durango
Month	Jan	Feb	Mar	Apr	May	Jun	Jul	Aug	Sep	Oct	Nov	Dec	Year
Record high °C (°F)	18.0 (64.4)	21.0 (69.8)	23.0 (73.4)	27.0 (80.6)	28.0 (82.4)	28.0 (82.4)	25.0 (77.0)	25.0 (77.0)	23.0 (73.4)	23.0 (73.4)	23.0 (73.4)	19.0 (66.2)	28.0 (82.4)
Mean daily maximum °C (°F)	17.0 (62.6)	19.0 (66.2)	21.0 (69.8)	24.0 (75.2)	26.0 (78.8)	27.0 (80.6)	24.0 (75.2)	24.0 (75.2)	22.0 (71.6)	22.0 (71.6)	19.0 (66.2)	17.0 (62.6)	21.8 (71.2)
Daily mean °C (°F)	11.0 (51.8)	14.0 (57.2)	16.0 (60.8)	19.0 (66.2)	22.0 (71.6)	23.0 (73.4)	21.0 (69.8)	21.0 (69.8)	18.0 (64.4)	17.0 (62.6)	16.0 (60.8)	11.0 (51.8)	17.4 (63.3)
Mean daily minimum °C (°F)	−1.0 (30.2)	1.0 (33.8)	2.0 (35.6)	4.0 (39.2)	7.0 (44.6)	12.0 (53.6)	12.0 (53.6)	11.0 (51.8)	10.0 (50.0)	6.0 (42.8)	3.0 (37.4)	0.0 (32.0)	5.58 (42.04)
Record low °C (°F)	−5.0 (23.0)	−4.0 (24.8)	−1.0 (30.2)	1.0 (33.8)	4.0 (39.2)	11.0 (51.8)	11.0 (51.8)	9.0 (48.2)	9.0 (48.2)	2.0 (35.6)	−2.0 (28.4)	−4.0 (24.8)	−5.0 (23.0)
Average precipitation mm (inches)	14.8 (0.58)	13.8 (0.54)	10.7 (0.42)	9.9 (0.39)	30.5 (1.20)	129.5 (5.10)	283.3 (11.15)	214.5 (8.44)	233.6 (9.20)	66.8 (2.63)	33.0 (1.30)	12.2 (0.48)	1,052.6 (41.44)
Average snowfall cm (inches)	0.4 (0.2)	1.6 (0.6)	0.4 (0.2)	0 (0)	0 (0)	0 (0)	0 (0)	0 (0)	0 (0)	0 (0)	0 (0)	1.8 (0.7)	4.2 (1.7)
Average precipitation days (≥ 0.1 mm)	4.0	3.0	5.0	4.0	7.0	19.0	26.0	23.0	25.0	12.0	6.0	3.0	130.0
Average snowy days (≥ 0.1 mm)	4.0	3.0	5.0	0	0	0	0	0	0	0	0	3.0	15
Source: World Weather Online

== Demographics ==
In 2010, there were 139 homes inhabited by 433 residents. As of 2020, there were 139 homes inhabited by 412 residents.

== Religion ==
The town of El Zape is mostly Catholic, the town's local church is called Iglesia de la Inmaculada Concepción.
