= Tepehuanes (disambiguation) =

Tepehuanes may refer to:

- Tepehuanes Municipality
- Santa Catarina de Tepehuanes, municipal seat of the municipality
- Tepehuanes River
- Tepehuán people
- Tepehuán language
