= Tepehuán Revolt =

Military conflict

- Part of the indigenous rebellions in Mexico
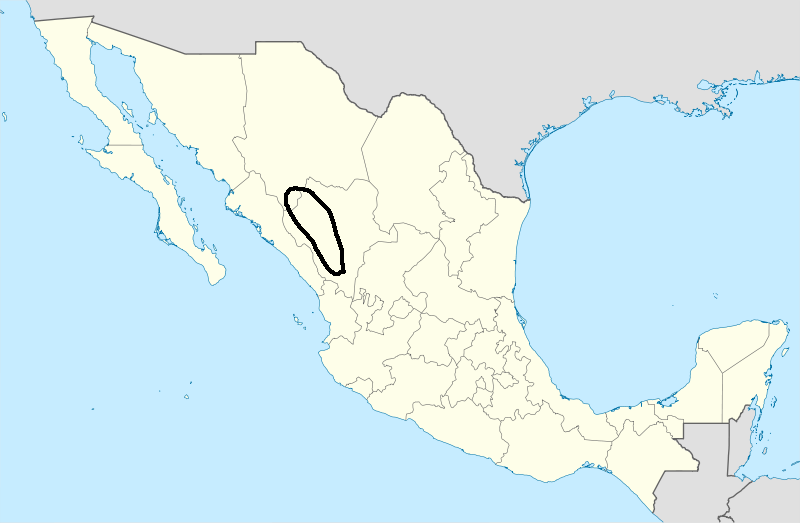
- In 1616, the Tepehuán lived primarily in what is now the state of Durango, on the eastern slopes of the Sierra Madre Occidental
Date	1616 – 1620
Location	Nueva Vizcaya, New Spain
Result	Spanish victory

Belligerents
Spaniards; Basques; Africans; Amerindian allies	Tepehuanes; Tepehuán allies: Irritillas; Acaxees; Xiximes; Humes; Mestizos

Commanders and leaders
Captains: Diego Martinez de Hurdaide; Bartolome Juarez; Ontiveros; Castañeda; Aguirre; Montaño; Mosquero	War Chiefs: Francisco Gogoxito; Mateo Canelas; Don Marcos; Don Pedro de Mezquital; Don Juan Atotonilco; Juan Marcos de Milpillas

The Tepehuán Revolt broke out in New Spain in 1616 when the indigenous Tepehuán attempted to break free from Spanish rule. The revolt was crushed by 1620 after a large loss of life on both sides.

== Tepehuán people ==
The Tepehuán people lived on the rugged eastern slopes and valleys of the Sierra Madre Occidental, primarily in the future state of Durango. They spoke a Uto-Aztecan language and depended mostly on agriculture for their livelihood. Thus, they differed from their neighbors in the deserts to the east, the Chichimeca who were nomadic and semi-nomadic hunter-gatherers.

The Tepehuán, Acaxee, and Xixime to their west shared common traits such as

the cultivation of corn, beans, squash, chiles, and cotton adjacent to dispersed, small villages and settlements;...frequent warfare with associated ritual cannibalism; polytheism and worship of idols; the presence of shamans or ritual specialists (hechiceros); and a decentralized political structure that relied on the leadership of elders in peacetime and on war leaders to deal with outsiders.

The Tepehuán suffered a series of devastating epidemics of European-introduced diseases in the years before the revolt. Epidemics were known to have occurred in their region in 1594, 1601-1602, 1606-1607, 1610, and 1616-1617. The Tepehuán and their neighbors may have been reduced in population by more than 80 percent by the epidemics, from a pre-Columbian population of more than 100,000 to fewer than 20,000, of which the Tepehuán may have been one-half of this total

During the Chichimeca War (1550–1590) the Tepehuán remained neutral although urged by the Chichimecas to join them in resistance to Spanish expansion. The Spanish failed to defeat the Chichimeca militarily and instituted a new policy called "peace by purchase" in which Catholic missionaries would be a major tool in pacifying hostile and semi-hostile native peoples. Indigenous groups were to be supplied with food and tools and resettled into towns. Missionaries, rather than the military, would take on most of the responsibility for integrating native peoples into Novohispanic and Christian society. The Acaxee and Xixime were the first to have this new Spanish policy applied to them and the Tepehuán would be next.

== Quautlatas and the Jesuits ==
Spanish settlers began arriving in Tepehuan country in the 1570s to mine silver and raise cattle. The Jesuits began missionary work among the Tepehuan in 1596, establishing missions at Santiago Papasquiaro and Santa Catarina de Tepehuanes and, later, El Zape. The Tepehuanes seemed relatively receptive to the missionaries, although they resisted living near the missions and working in Spanish mines and on haciendas, and often raided Amerindians friendly with the Spanish. Nevertheless, by 1615, a Jesuit declared that the Tepehuanes “showed great progress and were in the things of our holy faith muy ladino" (much like the Spanish).

In 1616, however, a messianic leader named Quautlatas who had been baptized as a Christian, arose among the Tepehuán. Quaultlatas traveled throughout the mountains, his symbol a broken cross, preaching that the gods were angry because the Tepehuan had abandoned them and that they must kill or expel all Spaniards, especially the missionaries, from their lands. Quaultlatas’ appeal to his people blended Christian and Indigenous beliefs. He called himself a bishop and he promised that all those killed by the Spanish would rise again after seven days and that, after the Spanish were killed, the old gods would bless their land with good crops and fat cattle – cattle being a Spanish introduction. Other examples in the Americas and worldwide include the Pueblo Revolt, the Ghost Dance, and the Boxer Rebellion.

In attempting to explain the cause of the Tepehuán revolt the Jesuits denied any Spanish responsibility. Rather, they saw the Spanish impact as beneficial. “Ever since the Spanish settled here, there has been an abundance of food, clothing, riches, and other material comforts,” said the priest Andres Perez de Ribas. What the Jesuits did not see was the connection in the Tepehuán’s mind between the arrival of the Spanish and death. The Jesuits celebrated the souls saved by deathbed baptisms, but the Tepehuán said that “the fathers had brought them disease and death with baptism, because after they were baptized they fell sick and died.” The Jesuit practice of consolidating native peoples into fewer and larger settlements caused the spread of disease. In Jesuit eyes, the opportunity to live in a town was a characteristic of civilization and was to be encouraged – or forced – upon the Indigenous people. Moreover, the Jesuits worked closely with the Spanish encomenderos and miners to provide them with a steady supply of Indigenous laborers.

As the Spanish perceived that they were providing both earthly and heavenly benefits to the Tepehuán, their explanation was that the revolt was the work of the devil. “It was Satan who intervened here, with a pure scheme and design…This was most clearly demonstrated by the diabolical shamans who had intimate dealings with the Devil and were the main force and instigators of the uprising.” Quautlatas was identified with the Antichrist and the Jesuit's assertion that the revolt was the work of the devil exonerated the Spaniards from blame. On their part, the Tepehuán fought to return to their traditional ways of life, hoping that worshiping their old gods and practicing their old culture would halt the horrific loss of life due to European diseases and their virtual enslavement by a few Spanish priests, miners, and encomenderos.

== Revolt ==
On November 16, 1616, a wagon train traveling to Mexico City was attacked by the Tepehuán just outside Santa Catarina de Tepehuanes, a small village in the eastern foothills of the Sierra Madre Occidental. Thus began what Jesuit historian Andrés Pérez de Ribas called the revolt

"one of the greatest outbreaks of disorder, upheaval, and destruction that had been seen in New Spain...since the Conquest."

Before it was finished four years later, more than 200 Spaniards, 10 missionaries, an unknown number of Amerindians, black slaves, and mestizos allied with the Spanish, and perhaps 4,000 Tepehuán died, many of hunger and disease, with destruction to property valued as much as a million pesos.

The Tepehuán attack on the Spaniards, under six war chiefs, most notably Francisco Gogoxito, was well coordinated as nearly simultaneous attacks at missions and Spanish settlements occurred throughout the region. 100 people were killed in a church at El Zape and a similar number died in Santiago Papasquiaro. Only a single Jesuit missionary in Tepehuán territory survived the initial attacks. At the first report of the outbreak, and fearing an attack on Durango itself (Guadiana), Governor Gaspar de Alvear arrested 75 local Indigenous leaders and ordered them executed. In December he led an expedition traversing Tepehuán country and rescued 400 Spanish and Indigenous allies. Another expedition consisting of 67 Spanish cavalry and 120 Indigenous Concho allies set out from Guadalajara in March 1617 and engaged and won several battles with the Tepehuán. In the war against the Tepehuán, the Spanish abandoned their conciliatory "peace by purchase" policy and instead waged a war of "fire and blood" (fuego y sangre). They targeted the six war chiefs and killed the last of them, Gogoxito, in March 1618 during the third major Spanish campaign. Quautlatas was also killed during the Spanish campaigns. However, the death of the war chiefs and Quautlatas did not end the hostilities. Tepehuan continued to raid Spanish settlements and then retreat to the mountains for safety. One Tepehuan raid on Mapimi left about 100 people dead.

Despite their initial successes, the Tepehuán were unable to persuade neighboring native groups to join their revolt and the Spanish prevailed. In 1618 the missionaries, Jesuits and Franciscans, were allowed to return to their missions. The Governor, however, declared that the province was “destroyed and devastated, almost depopulated of Spaniards. The…churches were burned. The silver mines and their machinery were also burned.” It would be half a century before the region returned to its former prosperity. The Tepehuán Revolt also caused a revision in Spanish policy toward the native peoples. Hereafter, the missions and settlements would be better protected by the military.

The revolt was officially declared at an end in 1620 but the Jesuits spent years trying to persuade many of the surviving Tepehuán to come down from the mountains to live at mission stations. They still faced hostility when they attempted to establish a mission among the Tepehuán in 1707 and it was 1745 before a large number of Tepehuán baptisms were reported. Slowly, the Tepehuán were overwhelmed in numbers by Spanish speakers and absorbed into mestizo society. But three groups survived: the northern Tepehuán in Chihuahua and the southeastern and southwestern Tepehuán in southern Durango. They still retain some of their old customs. The northern Tepehuán numbered 6,200 in 2005; the southeastern, 10,600, and the southwestern, 8,700.

== See also ==
- Mexican Indian Wars
