= Perico =

Perico may refer to:

== People ==
- Gabriele Perico (born 1984), Italian footballer
- Laura Perico (born 1989), Colombian actress
- Miguel Ángel Alonso or Perico Alonso (born 1953), father of Xabi Alonso
- Perico (Spanish footballer) (born 1985), Spanish footballer
- Perico Fernandez (1952–2016), professional boxer from Zaragoza, Spain
- Perico Sambeat (born 1962), Spanish jazz saxophonist
- Simone Perico (born 1989), Italian footballer
- Perico (elder), leader of the Acaxee tribe and their rebellion against the Spanish

== Places ==
- Perico, Cuba, a city in Matanzas Province
- Perico, Texas, a ghost town in the United States
- Ciudad Perico, a city in the Province of Jujuy, Argentina

== Other uses ==
- Perico (dish), a popular Venezuelan and Colombian dish based on scrambled eggs and various vegetables
- Perico (book), of short stories by Uruguayan writer Juan José Morosoli
- Perico, Spanish for parakeet
