= Félix López =

Félix López or Felix Lopez may refer to:

- Félix López (anarchist) (1904–?), Chilean anarchist
- Félix López, first municipal president of Tepehuanes independent municipality in 1917
