= Tepehuanes =

Municipality in Durango, Mexico

Coordinates: 25°20′35.11″N 105°43′25.46″W

Tepehuanes is a municipality in the Mexican state of Durango. It is located in the North West of Durango at 25°12'"-26°25'"N 105°23'"-106°40'"W, at an elevation of about 1,830 meters (6000 feet).

The municipal seat is at Santa Catarina de Tepehuanes.

== Name ==
The town gained its name from the native Tepehuan Indians. Their name is Nahuatl for mountain dweller.

== Population ==
As of 2010, the municipality had a total population of 10,745, down from 11,605 as of 2005.

The municipality had 340 localities, the largest of which (with Santa Catarina de Tepehuanes (4,761)), classified as urban.

== History ==
=== Founding ===
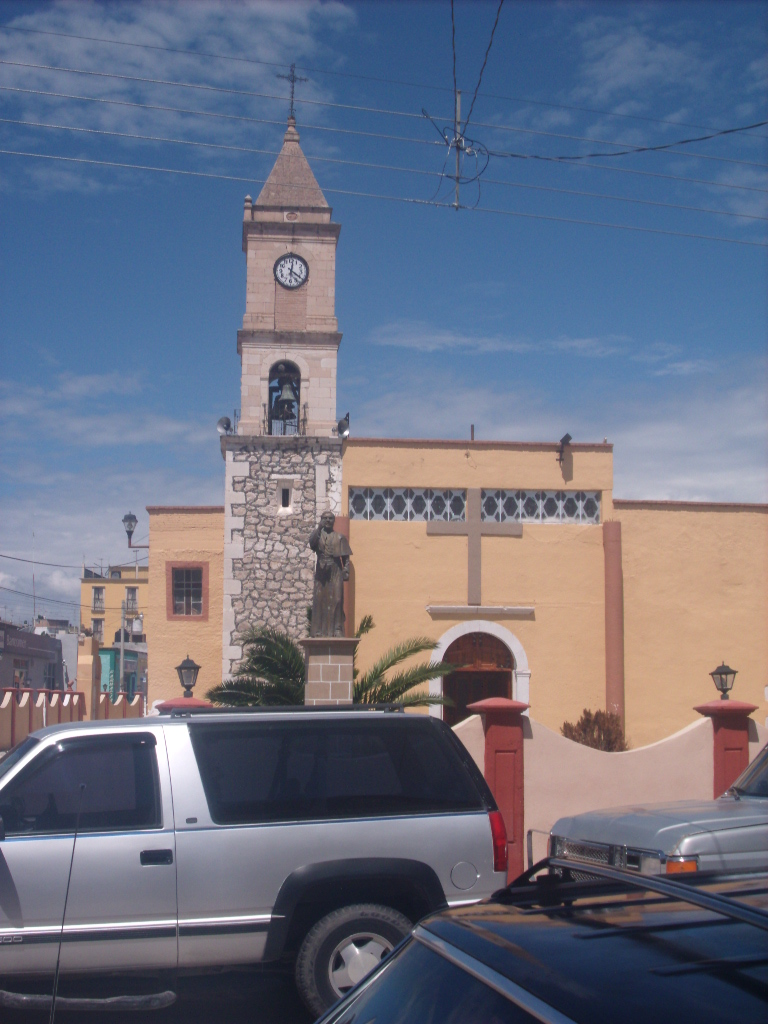
The current church at Santa Catarina de Tepehuanes.

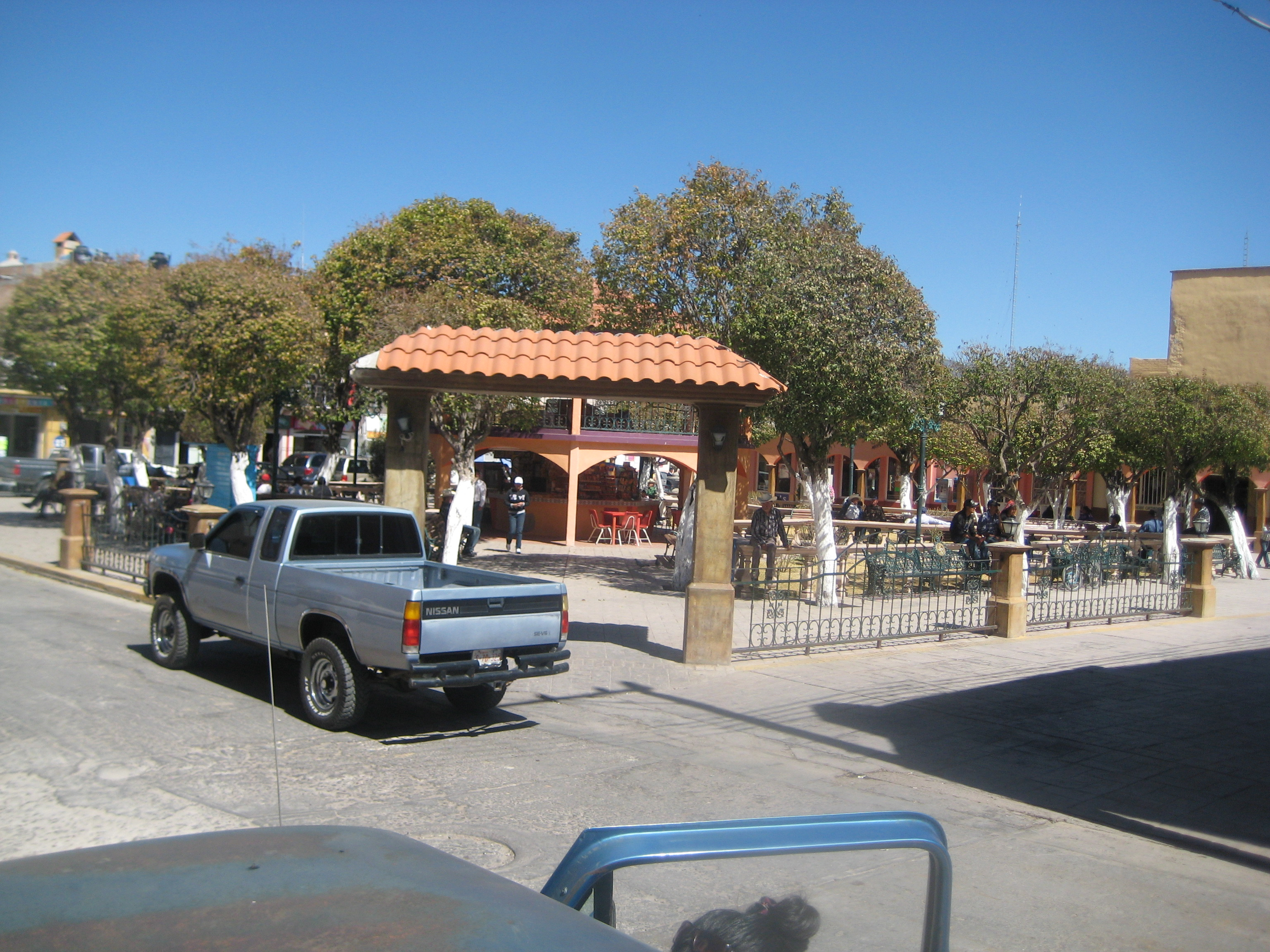
Central Plaza in Tepehuanes, Durango, Mexico. February 2011

When the Spanish arrived in the area, they met a large tribe known as the Great Tepehuan Nation living on the eastern side of the Sierra Madre Occidental. In 1597 Father and Jesuit Jerónimo Ramírez arrived from the northeast of Durango on a mission to establish missionaries and evangelize the natives who inhabited the region. After great difficulty and the help of a Tepehuan woman, he convinced the Tepehauns to establish a settlement on the bend that forms the terrain next to the Tepehuan River where the church symbolized the foundation. On 16 July 1597 the mission of Santa Catarina de Tepehuanes, Durango was founded, and would later be the base of the municipality of Tepehuanes.

=== Rebellion of 1616 ===
Although the Spanish were well received by the natives, the Spanish sought enrichment and power. They considered themselves a superior race, not just for the color of their skin, but for the power of their arms. They subjugated and enslaved the natives for their own private services. Nineteen years after the founding of the mission in Tepehuanes at the start of the 17th century, a rebellion by the Tepehuans began led by the violent and bewitching Quautlatas who martyred several priests, along with 70 black slaves, 200 Spaniards of all age and condition, and the countless converts who embraced their faith so much they chose death over renouncing it.

=== 18th Century to Today ===
For the 18th century Tepehaunes was part of Santiago Papasquiaro. In 1910 the Mexican Revolution began and Tepehuanes was not spared the fighting between the revolutionaries and the federalists. It's during the revolution that Tepehuanes became an independent municipality in 1917 due to the breakdown of political leadership. Félix López was its first municipal president. In March 1917 the Revolutionary Leader, Fransico Villa, was defeated in Tepehuanes by the General, Miguel Aguirre Gonzalez.

== Geography ==
=== Borders ===
It is bordered to the north by the municipality of Guanaceví, the municipality of El Oro to the east, the municipality of Santiago Papasquiaro to the south, the municipality of Canelas to the southwest, the municipality of Topia to the west, and the municipality of Tamazula to the northwest along with the state of Chihuahua.

=== Territory ===
The total area of the municipality (urban and rural) is 6401.50 square kilometers, which represents 95.95% of the state.

=== Climate ===
Climate data for Tepehuanes (1951–2010)
Month	Jan	Feb	Mar	Apr	May	Jun	Jul	Aug	Sep	Oct	Nov	Dec	Year
Record high °C (°F)	34.0 (93.2)	34.0 (93.2)	37.0 (98.6)	40.0 (104.0)	40.0 (104.0)	42.0 (107.6)	40.0 (104.0)	37.0 (98.6)	38.0 (100.4)	37.0 (98.6)	36.0 (96.8)	38.0 (100.4)	42.0 (107.6)
Mean daily maximum °C (°F)	21.3 (70.3)	23.2 (73.8)	26.5 (79.7)	29.4 (84.9)	32.1 (89.8)	33.2 (91.8)	30.6 (87.1)	30.6 (87.1)	28.9 (84.0)	27.8 (82.0)	25.3 (77.5)	22.1 (71.8)	27.5 (81.5)
Daily mean °C (°F)	10.4 (50.7)	11.6 (52.9)	14.5 (58.1)	17.7 (63.9)	20.7 (69.3)	23.5 (74.3)	22.6 (72.7)	22.1 (71.8)	20.8 (69.4)	17.9 (64.2)	14.1 (57.4)	11.1 (52.0)	17.3 (63.1)
Mean daily minimum °C (°F)	−0.5 (31.1)	0.1 (32.2)	2.6 (36.7)	5.9 (42.6)	9.2 (48.6)	13.8 (56.8)	14.6 (58.3)	14.1 (57.4)	12.7 (54.9)	8.0 (46.4)	2.8 (37.0)	0.1 (32.2)	7.0 (44.6)
Record low °C (°F)	−11.2 (11.8)	−9.0 (15.8)	−7.0 (19.4)	−6.5 (20.3)	1.0 (33.8)	4.5 (40.1)	4.0 (39.2)	6.0 (42.8)	0.0 (32.0)	−1.0 (30.2)	−8.5 (16.7)	−10.0 (14.0)	−11.2 (11.8)
Average precipitation mm (inches)	16.2 (0.64)	7.6 (0.30)	7.0 (0.28)	4.8 (0.19)	7.8 (0.31)	55.3 (2.18)	110.8 (4.36)	112.0 (4.41)	71.7 (2.82)	30.0 (1.18)	8.7 (0.34)	21.6 (0.85)	453.5 (17.85)
Average precipitation days (≥ 0.1 mm)	2.3	1.2	1.0	1.0	1.7	7.7	14.6	14.2	9.5	3.6	1.4	2.4	60.6
Average relative humidity (%)	60	56	49	46	48	51	59	65	65	60	58	58	56
Source: Servicio Meteorológico Nacional (Normals 1951-2010)(Extremes 1922-1988)(Humidity 1981-2000)

=== Communities ===
Tepehuanes has several branching communities (pueblos) surrounding the town.

- El Taiste
- San Jose De La Boca
- La Purísima
- El Rincón
- Carreras
- Los Pinos
- San Nicolás de El Presidios
- Sandías
- La Ciénega
- Corrales
- Arroyo Chico
- San Isidro De Las Calabazas
- La Conception (La Concha)
- Los Cerritos
- El Sebollin
- Los Bagres
- El Corazon
- La Candela
- Presidios
- San Ignacio
- Zapiguri del primo efrain huevon
- La Mesa De Navar
- San Pedro De Pescaderos
- El Potrero De Chaidez
- El Refugio
- San Miguel
