= List of Indigenous rebellions in Mexico and Central America =

Conflicts between colonizers and Indigenous nations in Mexico and Central America

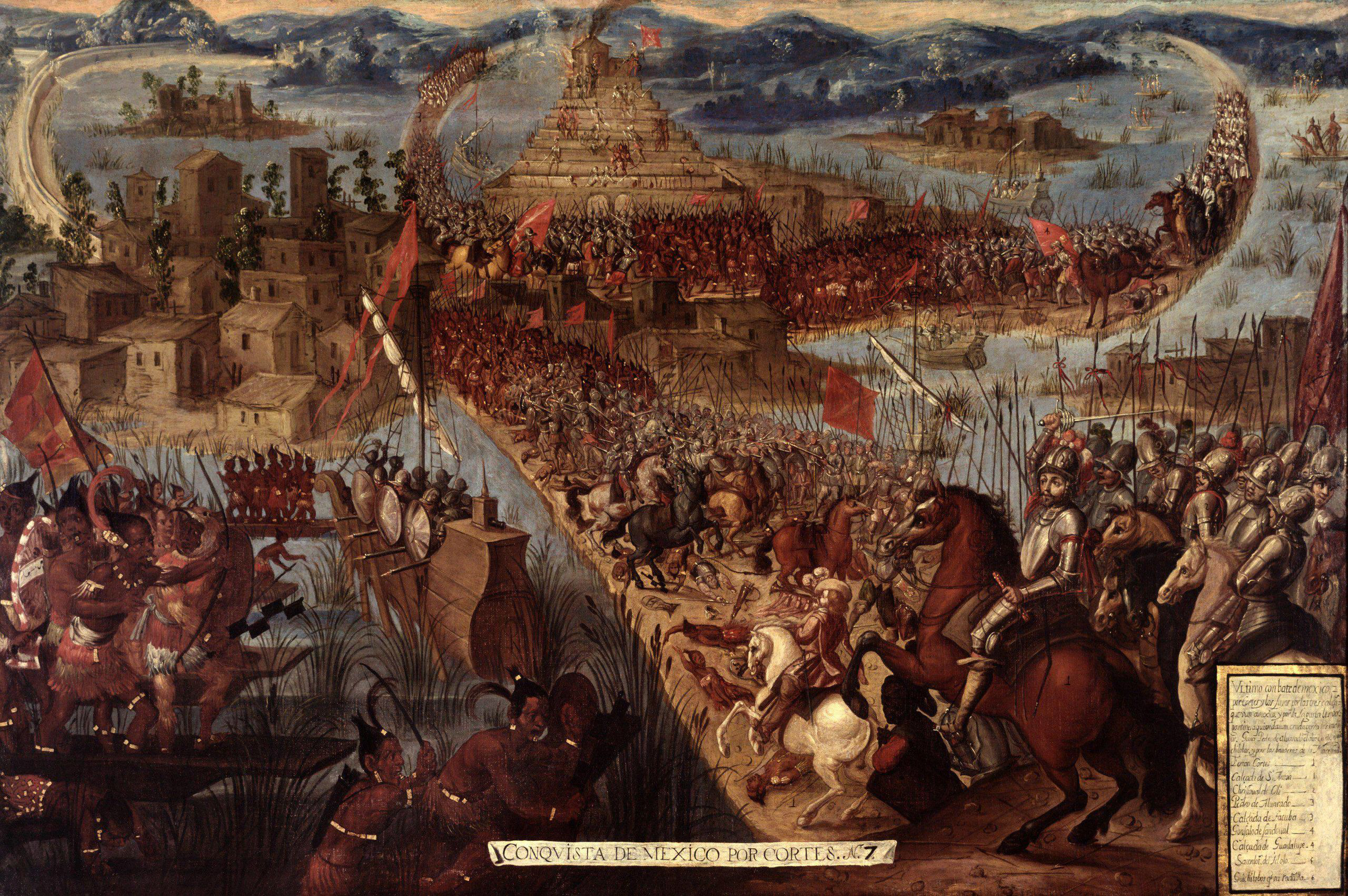
Depiction of the 1521 Fall of Tenochtitlan

Indigenous rebellions in Mexico and Central America were conflicts of resistance initiated by American Indian peoples against European colonial empires and their succeeding nation settler states that occurred in the territory of the continental Viceroyalty of New Spain and British Honduras, as well as their respective successor states. The latter include Mexico, Guatemala, Honduras, Belize, El Salvador, Nicaragua, Costa Rica, and parts of the Southern and Western United States.

Anti-colonial rebellions by the American Indians of Central America had precedence in resistance to the Aztec Empire prior to the Spanish conquest. During the period of Spanish rule, forced labor, the expansion of colonial territory, and the forceful reduction of disparate communities into villages or missions where Christianity was enforced were common causes of American indian revolt against European rule. After independence by European colonists from European colonial powers, continued encroachment on American Indian lands, continued and was the primary cause of conflict. Resistance had persisted into the 21st century, such as with the Zapatista uprising in Mexico.

== List of conflicts ==
Indigenous rebellions in Mexico and Central America
| Name | Start date | End date | Description of dispute | Result |
|---|---|---|---|---|
| Yaqui Wars | 1533 | 1929 | The Yaqui Wars were a series of armed conflicts between New Spain, and the later Mexican Republic, against the Yaqui Indians. Over the course of nearly 400 years, the Spanish and their Mexican descendants repeatedly launched military campaigns into Yaqui territory which resulted in several serious battles and massacres. | Successful resistance leading to better treatment of American Indians in North and South America |
| Mixtón War | 1540 | 1542 | The Mixtón War was a rebellion by the Caxcan people of northwestern Mexico against the Spanish conquistadors. The war was named after Mixtón, a hill in Zacatecas which served as an American Indian stronghold. | Spanish victory |
| Chichimeca War | 1550 | 1590 | The Chichimeca War was a military conflict between the Spanish Empire and the Chichimeca Confederation (including the Zacateco, Guachichil, Pame, Guamare, Caxcan, Tepecano, Tecuexe, and Otomi) established in the territories today known as the Central Mexican Plateau, called by the Conquistadores La Gran Chichimeca. The epicenter of the hostilities was the region now called the Bajío. The Chichimeca War is recorded as the longest and most expensive military campaign confronting the Spanish Empire and Indigenous people in Mesoamerica. | Chichimeca military victory: several peace treaties led to the pacification and, ultimately, the streamlined integration of the American Indians populations into the Spanish colonial society. |
| Apache–Mexico Wars | 1600s | 1915 | The Apache–Mexico Wars began in the 1600s with the arrival of Spanish colonists in present-day New Mexico. War between the Mexicans and the Apache was especially intense from 1831 into the 1850s. Thereafter, Mexican operations against the Apache coincided with the Apache Wars of the United States, such as during the Victorio Campaign. Mexico continued to operate against hostile Apache tribal bands as late as 1915. | Eventual Spanish, Mexican and U.S. victory |
| Acaxee Rebellion | 1601 | 1607 | A man named Perico initiated the rebellion promising millennial redemption using a mixture of Spanish and Indian religious practices. The rebellion aimed "to restore pre-Columbian social and religious elements that had been destroyed by the Spanish conquest." The Acaxee took up strong positions in the mountains and shut down most silver mining and other economic activities in their homeland for nearly two years. In 1603, Perico and most of the leadership of the revolt were killed, but resistance struggled on for 4 more years. | Spanish victory, but better treatment for Indian tribes and some rebels were able to join the Tepehuán Revolt in 1616. |
| Tepehuán Revolt | 1616 | 1620 | The Tepehuán Revolt broke out in Mexico in 1616 when the Tepehuán Indians attempted to break free from Spanish rule. The revolt was crushed by 1620 after a large loss of life on both sides. It is estimated that 400 Spaniards and 1000 Indians died. | Spanish victory |
| Tipu Revolt | 1638 | 1638 | The Tipu Revolt was an uprising of the Indigenous Maya people in modern Belize against the New Spanish province of Yucatán due to discontent regarding civil and religious requirements under encomienda, and Anglo-Dutch piratical raids. The revolt led to the death of one Spanish friar, and injury of under 100 Maya individuals. | Maya victory and withdrawal by the Spanish until 1695 |
| Pueblo Revolt | 1680 | 1692 | The Pueblo Revolt was an uprising of the Indigenous Pueblo people against the New Spanish province of New Mexico against oppressive labor conditions, suppression of traditional religious beliefs, and Spanish violence. The Pueblo Revolt killed 400 Spaniards and drove the remaining 2,000 settlers out of the province. | Pueblo victory and expulsion of the Spanish until 1692 |
| Pablo Presbere's insurrection | 1709 | 1710 | The king of Talamanca, Pablo Presbere, intercepted a letter ordering the reduction of his people into a series of Spanish-controlled villages. Together with the Teribe and Cabécare, he launched a series of attacks on Spanish settlements. After some initial success, the authorities in Cartago launched a retaliatory expedition. Talamanca and its allies were defeated and the leaders executed. | Spanish victory |
| Tzeltal Rebellion | 1712 | 1713 | In 1712, a number of Maya communities in the Soconusco region of Chiapas rose in rebellion. It was a multiethnic revolt, with 32 towns of Tzeltal, Tzotzil, and Chol peoples participating. The rebels renounced the authority of the Catholic hierarchy and established a priesthood of Indigenous men. The rebel army called itself the “soldiers of the Virgin.” | Spanish victory |
| Pima Revolt | 1751 | 1752 | The Pima Revolt was a revolt of Pima people against colonial forces in Pimería Alta, New Spain. The revolt culminated from decades of violence by the local Spanish settlers against Indians beginning in 1684. While the 15,000 rebels had no central authority, the charismatic Luis Oacpicagigua was influential in unifying them under a single war plan. The initial act of rebellion was the massacre of 18 settlers lured to Oacpicagigua's home in Sáric. In the ensuing three months, Oacpicagigua and more than a hundred other men attacked the mission at Tubutama, and other Spanish settlements, and more than a hundred settlers were killed. Oacpicagigua surrendered to Captain José Díaz del Carpio on March 18, 1752 after a negotiated peace. When the Pima leaders laid the blame for the revolt on Jesuit missionaries (who would be expelled from Spain and its colonies in 1767) they were pardoned by the colonial governor Ortiz Parrilla. | Spanish victory; through Negotiation, surrender, by American Indian rebels, eventually pardoned |
| Totonicapán Uprising | 1820 | 1820 | The Totonicapán Uprising was an uprising of K'iche' people against the Spanish Empire in Totonicapán, located in the western highlands of Guatemala. The revolt was in response to the excessive tribute demanded by the colonial authorities, and managed to establish a short lived breakaway state in Totonicapán with a free American Indian only government. The rebellion was concurrent at the same time with the criollo independence of Central America and other Spanish American wars of independence. | Spanish victory, but the leaders would be pardoned due to the ongoing colonial criollo Independence struggles |
| Texas–Indian wars | 1820 | 1875 | The Texas–Indian wars were a series of conflicts between Spanish, Mexican, and later Anglo settlers in Texas and American indian peoples of Texas, especially the Comanche and Lipan Apache. These conflicts began when the first wave of white hispanic settlers moved into Spanish Texas. They continued through Texas's time as part of Mexico, when more Europeans and Anglo-Americans arrived, to rebel and declare the subsequent declaration of independence established on behalf of the Republic of Texas from Mexico. The conflicts did not end until thirty years after Texas joined the United States. | American victory; genocide of peoples including the Karankawa, Akokisa, and Bidai, and forced removal of other peoples such as the Comanche and Caddo onto reservations in Oklahoma. |
| Comanche–Mexico Wars | 1821 | 1870 | The Comanche–Mexico Wars was the Mexican theater of the Comanche Wars. There were large-scale raids into northern Mexico by the Comanche and their Kiowa and Kiowa Apache allies, which left thousands of people dead. The Comanche raids were sparked by the declining military capability of Mexico during the turbulent years after it gained independence in 1821, as well as a large and growing market in the United States for stolen Mexican horses and cattle. | Eventual American victory, with Comanche forced onto reservations |
| Chumash revolt | 1824 | 1824 | The Chumash revolt of 1824 was an uprising of the Chumash Indians against the Spanish and Mexican presence in their ancestral lands. The rebellion began in 3 of the California Missions in Alta California: Mission Santa Inés, Mission Santa Barbara, and Mission La Purisima, and spread to the surrounding villages. All three missions are located in present-day Santa Barbara County, California. The Chumash revolt was the largest organized resistance movement to occur during the Spanish and Mexican periods in California. | Mexican victory |
| Anastasio Aquino's Rebellion | 1832 | 1833 | Anastasio Aquino's Rebellion was an uprising led by Salvadoran American Indian leader Anastasio Aquino against the criollo independent Federal Republic of Central America. | Central American victory |
| Chimayó Rebellion | 1837 | 1837 | The Chimayó Rebellion was a popular insurrection in New Mexico against governor Albino Pérez. | Mexican victory |
| Caste War of Yucatán | 1847 | 1933 | The Caste War of Yucatán was the revolt of the Maya people of the Yucatán Peninsula against the Yucatecos, or the local white and mixed-race elites. By the 1840s, economic development had led to Maya peasants being stripped of their land and forced into debt bondage. The revolt was assisted by the United Kingdom because of the value of its trading with British Honduras. By 1867 the Maya occupied parts of the western part of the Yucatán. But growing investment in Mexico changed British policy, and in 1893 it ceased to recognize the Maya state. The war unofficially ended in 1901 when the Mexican army occupied the Maya capital of Chan Santa Cruz and subdued neighboring areas. Another formal end was made in 1915, when a Mexican general was sent to subdue the territory. He introduced reforms from the revolution that ended some of the grievances. However, skirmishes with small settlements that refused to acknowledge Mexican control continued until 1933. | Mexican victory |
| Mexican Revolution in Morelos | February 1911 | 1920 | When the Mexican Revolution began in 1911, the American Indian villages of Morelos had been facing decades of encroachment by sugar-producing haciendas and the steady proletarianization of their inhabitants. Throughout the next nine years, a revolutionary army led by Emiliano Zapata grew rapidly in strength, eventually coming to dominate Morelos and the surrounding states. After the Zapatistas defeated the attempts of four successive national governments to subjugate the state, Zapata's successor Gildardo Magaña was able to negotiate a peace with President Álvaro Obregón. | Successful: Morelos was able to conduct land reform according the Plan of Ayala and the American Indian villages were restored. |
| Chiapas conflict | January 1994 | 2014 | On January 1, 1994, the Zapatista Army of National Liberation (EZLN) coordinated a 12-day Zapatista uprising in the state of Chiapas, Mexico in protest of NAFTA's enactment. This led to the establishment by the Zapatistas of an autonomous area under their control in the state. It has involved Tzeltal and Tzotzil Maya, other American Indian groups, and Ladinos, among others. | Status quo, due to a mostly static, peaceful accommodation between the far left American Indian militia, EZLN and the Mexican government |

== See also ==
- Arauco War
- Rebellion of Túpac Amaru II
- List of battles won by Indigenous peoples of the Americas
- List of Indian massacres in North America
- American Indian wars
