= Quautlatas =

- Born: ? Tepehuánes, Durango
- Died: c. 1616; Durango
- Citizenship: Tepehuán
- Occupation: Religious leader (of the Tepehuán Revolt)

Quautlatas (Northern Tepehuán pronunciation: /quäutlˈätäs/) was a Tepehuán religious leader who inspired the bloody Tepehuán Revolt against the Spanish in Mexico in 1616. Quautlatas was known as "The Tepehuán Prophet".

== The Tepehuán and the Spanish ==
The Tepehuán were an agricultural people who lived primarily in the future Mexican state of Durango on the eastern slopes of the Sierra Madre Occidental. Early Spanish explorers described them as numerous but, apparently, a series of epidemics of introduced European diseases reduced their numbers by more than 80 percent. By the time of the revolt their numbers may have been only about 10,000 Spanish silver miners and ranchers began settling in the Tepehuán lands in the 1570s and Jesuit missionaries began work among them in 1596. The Tepehuán seemed relatively receptive to the missionaries and by 1615 a Jesuit could declare that the Tepehuán “showed great progress and were in the things of our holy faith very Hispanic.

What the Jesuits and other Spaniards did not fully comprehend was that the Tepehuán were a people under enormous stress. The recurrent epidemics impoverished them and destroyed their faith in their traditional culture. The missionaries tried to convert them to Christianity by abolishing their religious practices, replacing their leaders with Christians, and introducing Spanish customs. Both missionaries and encomenderos demanded their labor in the mines and the missions and on the ranches. The missionaries perceived they were doing God’s work by baptizing Indians dying of disease; the Indians equated baptism with death.

== The prophet ==
In early 1616, an elderly traditional religious leader, Quautlatas, rose to leadership among the Tepehuán and promised to lead them out of bondage. Quautlatas had been baptized a Christian and his message to his people had Christian elements in it. He called himself a bishop and carried a broken cross as his idol. To placate the gods, he said, the Tepehuán “would have to cut the throats” of all Christians. “If they did not do this they would receive a terrible punishment in the form of illnesses, plagues, and famine. But if they obeyed him, he promised them…victory over the Spaniards. Even if some of them should die in battle, he promised them that within seven days they would be resurrected…. God would create storms at seas, sinking the Spanish ships and thus preventing additional Spaniards from reaching these lands.”

Quautlatas message was typical of millennial movements such as the Pueblo Revolt led by another messianic figure, Popé, in the same century, and much later events such as the Ghost Dance in the U.S. and the Boxer Rebellion in China. Quautlatas promised divine intervention to return to an idealized past in which the plagues and suffering brought upon the Tepehuán by the Spanish would disappear.

The principal chronicler of the Tepehuán Revolt, the Jesuit priest Andres Perez de Ribas, cited the devil as causing the revolt. It was not mistreatment by the Spanish which caused the revolt but rather “Satan who intervened here, with a pure scheme and design, which was received by these blind people. It enraged their spirit to take up arms against the faith of Christ and all that was Christianity…..This was most clearly demonstrated by the diabolical shamans who had intimate dealings with the Devil and were the main force and instigators of the uprising.” Perez de Ribas compared Quautlatas with the antiChrist.

== The Revolt ==
Quautlatas did not lead the Tepehuán in the revolt which began in November 1616. Six war leaders carried out a series of coordinated attacks that left hundreds of Spaniards, including ten priests, and their Indigenous (American Indian) allies dead. (See Tepehuán Revolt) The Spanish counterattack in 1617 and 1618 was brutal. Many Tepehuán who were not killed or enslaved fled to the remotest part of the mountains where they avoided contact with the Spanish for more than 100 years. Quautlatas was apparently killed by the Spanish or died shortly after the war began. The revolt left the province “destroyed and devastated, almost depopulated of Spaniards. It was one of the three bloodiest and most destructive Indian attempts to throw off Spanish control in northwestern New Spain." (the other two being the Mixton War and the Chichimeca War).
