= Acaxee Rebellion =

Military conflict

- Part of the Mexican Indian Wars
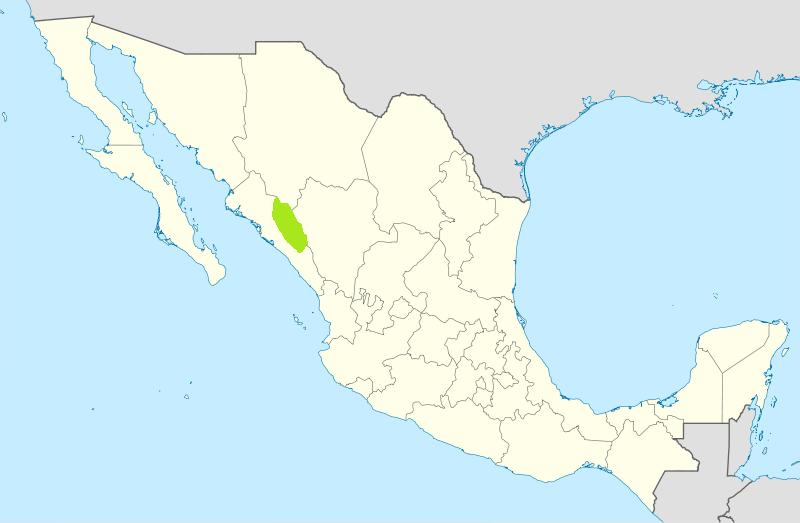
- A map of Mexico showing the location of the Acaxee in Sinaloa and Durango states.
Date	1601–1607
Location	Sinaloa and Durango
Result	Acaxee Defeated

Belligerents
Spaniards	Acaxee; Tepehuanos; Xiximes

Strength
450	500-1,000

Casualties and losses
56 killed	48 executed

The Acaxee Rebellion was an insurrection against Spanish rule in Mexico by Acaxee Indians, in 1601. The Acaxee attempted to expel the Spanish from their lands, regain their independence, and retain their traditional culture which was threatened by forced labor and Jesuit missionaries imposed upon them by the Spanish. They killed about 50 Spaniards and shut down silver mining operations in their territory for two years. In 1603, a Spanish army with Indian allies defeated the Acaxee and captured and executed most of their leaders. Subsequent smallpox epidemics killed most of the surviving Acaxee.

== Acaxee ==
The Acaxee spoke a Uto-Aztecan language and lived in the mountains, the Sierra Madre Occidental, and canyons of east central Sinaloa and western Durango, east of the city of present-day city of Culiacan. Their territory was about 125 miles north to south and 50 miles east to west. The area was called Topia and Tepehuana by the Spaniards. The Acaxee and their neighbors shared common features of culture identified by scholar Susan M. Deeds as

the cultivation of corn, beans, squash, chilies, and cotton adjacent to small villages and settlements…; frequent warfare with associated ritual cannibalism; polytheism and worship of idols; the presences of shamans or ritual specialists…; and a decentralized political structure that relied on the leadership of elders in peacetime and on war leaders to deal with outsiders.

The dispersed village culture of the Acaxee at the time of the first Spanish contact in the late 16th century may have been the remnant of a more complex hierarchical society that had been decimated by disease earlier in the same century. An epidemic swept the region in 1576–1577, killing many thousands of Indians including possibly many Acaxee, and additional epidemics broke out in 1590 and 1596–1597. Thus, by the time of the rebellion the Acaxee probably numbered only a few thousand. Furthermore, their capacity to resist the Spanish was adversely impacted by their endemic warfare with the Xixime to their south and the Tepehuan to the east.

== Spaniards ==
The Spanish discovered silver deposits in Acaxee territory in the 1580s and established several mining camps. Several hundred Spaniards, African and Indian slaves, and Indian laborers migrated into the Acaxee country. They needed additional labor to work in the mines. Through the encomienda system the Indians were forced to work in Spanish mines. However, the dispersed nature of the Acaxee settlements was a hindrance to utilizing Indian labor.

Jesuit missionaries assisted in concentrating the Acaxee in larger settlements, a Spanish policy called reductions, to Christianize, control, and exploit the labor of the Indians. In the "Peace by Purchase" plan to resolve the Chichimeca War in 1590 the Spanish had recognized the utility of missionaries in the pacification of the northern frontiers of Nueva Espana. The Jesuits were relative newcomers to Mexico and the Indians of Sinaloa and Durango were their first major missionary efforts. In 1600, the missionary Hernando de Santarén toured the region with a local encomendero, Captain Diego de Avila. Together they made the Acaxee accede to Spanish demands which included relocating to where the Spanish told them, building churches, cutting their long hair, wearing clothing, and destroying their religious images and idols. In return, the Spaniards promised to protect them from their enemies and provide tools, seeds, and schools for their communities. Indians who resisted the Spanish demands were beaten according to Deeds.

== Rebellion ==
An Indian leader named Perico initiated the rebellion in late 1601. Using a mixture of Spanish and Indian religious practices, he promised his followers that the Spanish could be exterminated. The rebellion "was characterized by messianic leadership and promises of millennial redemption during a period of violent disruption and catastrophic demographic decline due to disease." The rebellion aimed "to restore pre-Columbian social and religious elements that had been destroyed by the Spanish conquest."

Indian attacks over the first few weeks killed about 50 Spaniards. The Acaxee burned Spanish mining camps and buildings, including 40 churches, and besieged 40 Spanish in a church at San Andres. The siege was raised when reinforcements arrived from Durango. The priest Santarén led a peace delegation but several members of his group were killed as were members of another delegation led by a bishop.

The Acaxee took up strong positions in the mountains and shut down most silver mining and other economic activities in their homeland for nearly two years. In 1603, the Spaniards gathered an army of encomenderos and Indian allies and suppressed the Acaxee, executing Perico and 48 of their leaders and selling others into slavery.

In the aftermath of the war the Jesuits assumed even greater influence, consolidating the Acaxee into a few settlements, appointing their leaders, and attempting to educate Indian children and remove them from the influence of their parents, attempting to stamp out Acaxee culture. In 1607, a smallpox epidemic combined with the simultaneous appearance of Halley's Comet, a portent of disaster, seems to have erased most remaining traces of the Acaxee independence movement, although a few joined the Tepehuán Revolt in 1616.
