= Guanaceví Municipality =

Municipality in the Mexican state of Durango

Guanaceví
- Municipality
- Municipality of Guanaceví in Durango

- Location in Mexico
- Coordinates: 25°56′0″N 106°0′0″W
- Country: Mexico
- State: Durango
- Municipal seat: Guanaceví

Area
  - Total: 5,246.9 km^{2} (2,025.8 sq mi)

Population (2010)
  - Total: 10,149
  - Density: 1.9343/km^{2} (5.0098/sq mi)
- Time zone: UTC-6 (Zona Centro)

Guanaceví is a municipality in the Mexican state of Durango. The municipal seat is at Guanaceví. The municipality covers an area of 5246.9 km^{2}.

In 2010, the municipality had a total population of 10,149, down from 10,224 in 2005.

In 2010, the town of Guanaceví had a population of 2,908. Other than the town of Guanaceví, the municipality had 348 localities, none of which had a population over 1,000.
