= Félix López (anarchist) =

Félix López (born 1904) was a Chilean labor activist and anarchist. He was an electrician, and steward in the Construction Union. His La Protesta was the first anarchist newspaper in Chile.
