= Xiximes =

- Xixime territory circa 1500

Regions with significant populations
- Mexico (Durango, Sinaloa)

Languages
- Xixime language

Religion
- Xixime mythology, Shamanism, Animistic, Peyotism, and Roman Catholic

Related ethnic groups
- Guasaves, Achires, Cáhita, Tepehuán, Acaxee

The Xixime were an indigenous people who inhabited a portion of the Sierra Madre Occidental mountains in the present day states of Durango and Sinaloa, Mexico. The Xixime are noted for their reported practice of cannibalism and resistance to Spanish colonization in the form of the Xixime Rebellion of 1610.

== Language ==
Xixime
- Native to: Mexico
- Region: Durango, Sinaloa
- Ethnicity: Xixime
- Extinct: (date missing)
- Language family: unclassified (Uto-Aztecan?): Xixime
- Dialects: Hine; Hume

Language codes
- ISO 639-3: None (mis)
- Linguist List: 0vt Xixime
- 0wg Hine
- 0wj Hume
- Glottolog: None

The Xixime spoke Xixime, a poorly documented, now-extinct language. Dialects of Xixime included Hine and Hume (to the north and south of the Xixime territory, respectively). The exact classification of the language is unknown.

== Cannibalism ==
A considerable amount of the scholarship and media attention devoted to the Xixime has focused on the group's reported practice of cannibalism. While a variety of colonial Spanish accounts of the Xixime report the culture engaged in frequent, ritual consumption of enemy peoples, the historical accuracy of the allegations is disputed.

A number of historians including Susan M. Deeds apply theories developed by Gananath Obeyesekere on Aztec sacrifice to suggest that the practice of cannibalism was "exaggerated or contrived" by the Xixime to intimidate their Spanish enemies.

In 2011, José Luis Punzo argued that newly discovered bones from Cueva del Mague, Durango, constituted proof of the practice, citing evidence of "boiling and defleshing."

== Relationship with the Spanish ==
=== Impressions ===
Conquistador Nuño de Guzmán first documented the existence of the Xixime via reports collected by scouts during a 1530 expedition. In comparison with their neighbors, the Xiximes were regarded as relatively civilized by the Spanish given their urban settlements and stone buildings.

=== Xixime Rebellion of 1610 ===
Map of approximate Xixime and Acaxee territories

Despite initially tolerating the presence of Spanish missions in neighboring territories, the Xiximes, in 1610, began organizing violent resistance to colonial incursions. The Xiximes solicited help from the Acaxees (their northern neighbors and historical enemies) and Tepehuán arguing that Jesuit churches were "temples of disease" and that destroying them would bring immortality. In response to Acaxee unwillingness to cooperate in anti-Spanish rebellion, the Xiximes began organizing attacks on Acaxee villages.

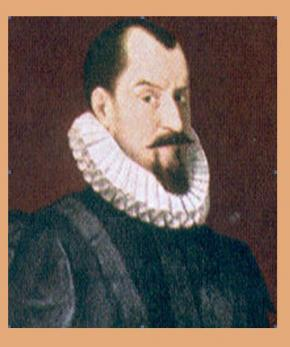
Francisco de Urdiñola

To fend off the attacks, the Acaxee requested protection from the Spanish. In response, Francisco de Urdiñola attempted to secure peace through diplomatic means, though such efforts were spurned by the Xiximes. Aided by 200 Spanish soldiers and 1,100 indigenous allies, Urdiñola attempted to quell the Acaxee-led. By October, the surrender of key rebel leaders had effectively ended the uprising.

=== Tepehuán Revolt ===
The Tepehuán Revolt of 1616, which proved significantly harder to contain than the Xixime Rebellion, enjoyed widespread Xixime support.
