= Guanaceví =

Town in the Mexican state of Durango

- Municipal seat and city
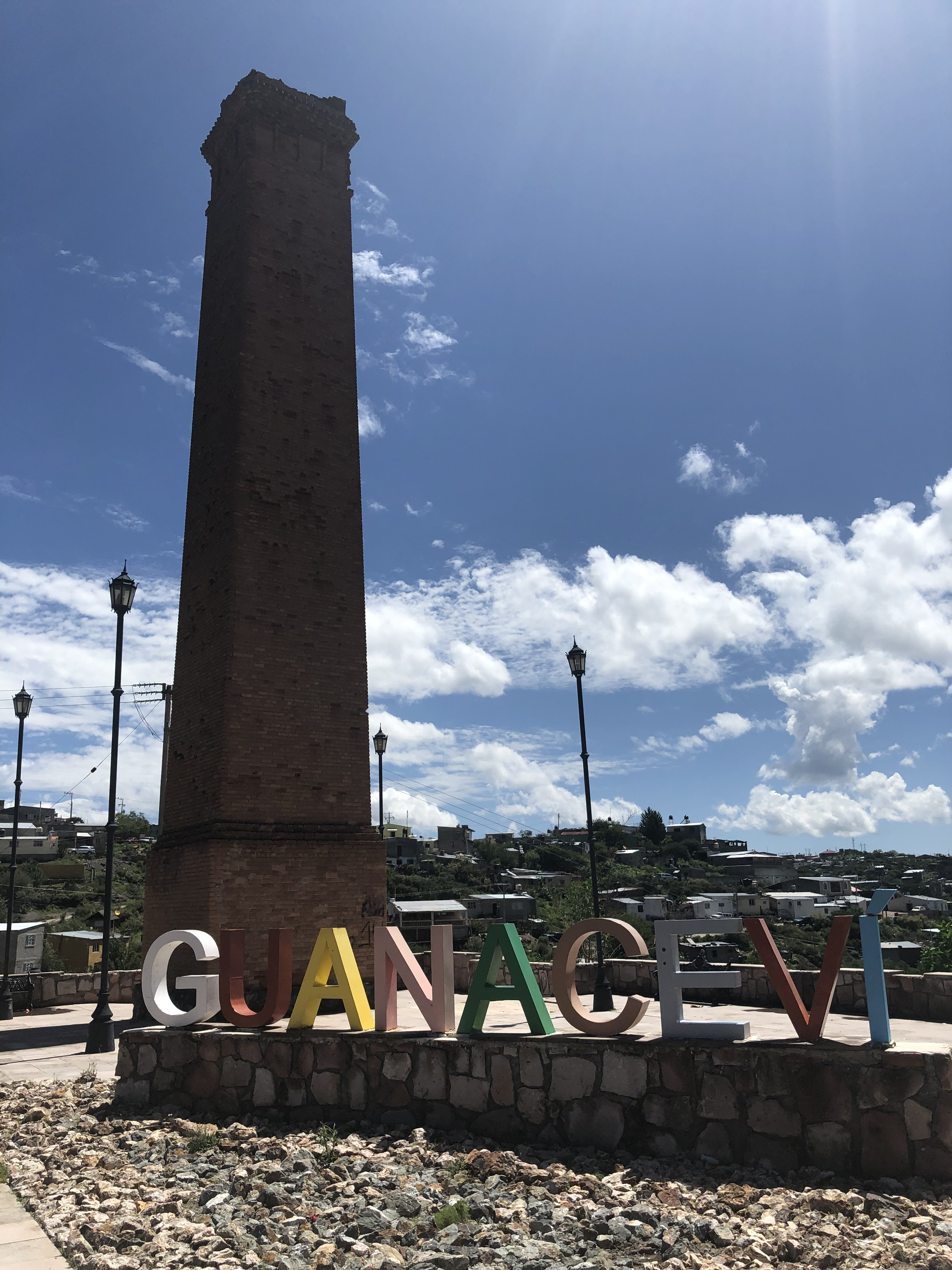
- Letters of Guanaceví

- Location in Mexico
- Coordinates: 25°55′54″N 105°57′13″W
- Country: Mexico
- State: Durango
- Municipality: Guanaceví
- Elevation: 2,100 m (6,900 ft)

Population (2015)
  - Total: 2,908

Guanaceví is a town located in the northwest of the Mexican state of Durango. As of 2015, the town of Guanaceví had a population of 2,908. It serves as the municipal seat of the municipality of Guanaceví, which in the 2015 Census had a population of 9,851. It is filled with mines that contain many minerals such as gold, silver, and brass. It has many food traditions that includes sopes, enchiladas, chapaneco, tezhuino, queso, chiles rellenos, etc.

Early history of this town can be found in Perez de Ribas Paginas, book3.

== Climate ==
Climate data for Guanaceví (1991–2020)
Month	Jan	Feb	Mar	Apr	May	Jun	Jul	Aug	Sep	Oct	Nov	Dec	Year
Record high °C (°F)	28.2 (82.8)	30.0 (86.0)	32.0 (89.6)	41.0 (105.8)	39.0 (102.2)	39.0 (102.2)	37.0 (98.6)	38.0 (100.4)	33.5 (92.3)	31.0 (87.8)	29.0 (84.2)	29.0 (84.2)	41.0 (105.8)
Mean daily maximum °C (°F)	17.0 (62.6)	19.8 (67.6)	22.9 (73.2)	25.6 (78.1)	28.7 (83.7)	30.8 (87.4)	28.4 (83.1)	27.9 (82.2)	25.8 (78.4)	24.1 (75.4)	21.4 (70.5)	17.1 (62.8)	24.1 (75.4)
Daily mean °C (°F)	7.1 (44.8)	9.9 (49.8)	12.5 (54.5)	15.0 (59.0)	17.9 (64.2)	20.4 (68.7)	19.4 (66.9)	18.9 (66.0)	17.2 (63.0)	14.7 (58.5)	11.6 (52.9)	7.4 (45.3)	14.3 (57.7)
Mean daily minimum °C (°F)	−2.8 (27.0)	0.0 (32.0)	2.1 (35.8)	4.3 (39.7)	7.1 (44.8)	10.0 (50.0)	10.4 (50.7)	10.0 (50.0)	8.6 (47.5)	5.4 (41.7)	1.7 (35.1)	−2.4 (27.7)	4.5 (40.1)
Record low °C (°F)	−16.0 (3.2)	−17.0 (1.4)	−13.0 (8.6)	−8.0 (17.6)	−4.0 (24.8)	0.0 (32.0)	0.0 (32.0)	2.0 (35.6)	−1.0 (30.2)	−5.0 (23.0)	−14.0 (6.8)	−15.0 (5.0)	−17.0 (1.4)
Average precipitation mm (inches)	12.6 (0.50)	8.3 (0.33)	13.1 (0.52)	1.8 (0.07)	11.5 (0.45)	75.0 (2.95)	195.6 (7.70)	168.2 (6.62)	138.3 (5.44)	38.5 (1.52)	26.6 (1.05)	15.3 (0.60)	704.8 (27.75)
Average precipitation days (≥ 0.1 mm)	2.4	2.0	1.9	0.7	2.6	10.0	18.3	16.4	13.2	5.0	3.2	2.8	78.5
Source: Servicio Meteorologico Nacional
