= Acaxee =

- Acaxee territory circa 1500

Total population
- extinct

Regions with significant populations
- Mexico (Sinaloa and Durango)

Languages
- Acaxee and Spanish

Religion
- Acaxee mythology and Animism

Related ethnic groups
- Xiximes, Achires, Tarahumara, Tepehuanes, and Cahita

The Acaxee or Acaxees (Note: Alternate spellings include: Acage, Acagee, Acaje, Acajee, Acaxe.) were an Indigenous people of the Sierra Madre Occidental in eastern Sinaloa and northwestern Durango. They spoke a Taracahitic language in the Uto-Aztecan language family. Their culture was based on horticulture and the exploitation of wild animal and plant life. They no longer exist as an identifiable ethnic group.

== History ==
Before Spanish colonization, the population of the Acaxee was roughly 20,000 organized into many smaller independent chiefdoms. They lived in very low-density farms with homes separated by up to half a kilometer. Early accounts by Jesuit missionaries allege continual warfare and cannibalism among the Acaxee, Tepehuan, and Xixime who inhabited Nueva Vizcaya.

The Spanish conquered Sinaloa from 1529 to 1531 which included conquering the Acaxee. They were devastated by Spanish introduced diseases and the encomienda system. In December 1601, the Acaxees, under the direction of an elder named Perico, began an uprising against Spanish rule. This revolt was called the Acaxee Rebellion, but eventually ended in a defeat of the Acaxee.

They are said to have been converted to the Catholic faith by the society of Jesuits in 1602. Over the centuries of Spanish rule, the Acaxee were gradually assimilated into Mexican society, and while no longer a separate ethnic group, many in Sinaloa are descendants of the Acaxee.

== Culture ==
Ethnographer Ralph Beals reported in the early 1930s that the Acaxee played a ball game called "vatey [or] batey" on "a small plaza, very flat, with walls at the sides".

== Subdivisions ==
- Acaxee (proper)
- Sabaibo
- Tebaca
- Papudo
- Tecaya

== See also ==
- Xiximes
