= Tepehuán =

Indigenous people of Mexico

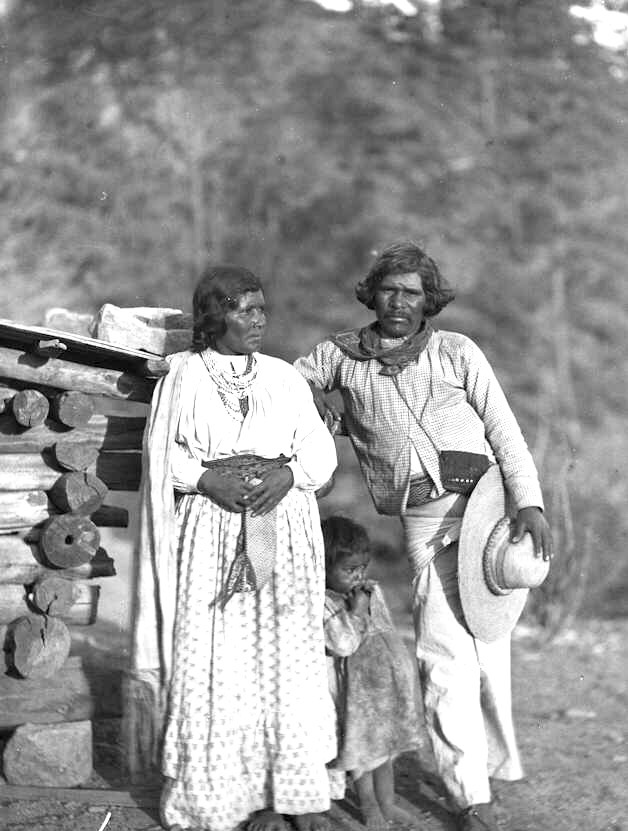
- Tepehuán mother, father and child from Durango. Carl Lumholtz, 1893.

Total population
- approx 35,000–40,000

Regions with significant populations
- Mexico (Durango, Chihuahua, Sinaloa, Jalisco, Zacatecas, Nayarit)

Languages
- O'otham, Nahuatl, and Spanish

Religion
- Tepehuán Mythology, Shamanism, Animistic, Peyotism, and Roman Catholic

Related ethnic groups
- Acaxee, Mountain Pima, Tohono O'odham, Tarahumara, Tepecanos, Chichimecas, Cora, Huichol, Mexicanero Xiximes, Akimel O'odham, and Totorames

The Tepehuán are an Indigenous people of Mexico. They live in Northwestern, Western, and some parts of North-Central Mexico. The Indigenous Tepehuán language has three branches: Northern Tepehuan, Southeastern Tepehuan, Southwestern Tepehuan. The heart of the Tepehuan territory is in the Valley of Guadiana in Durango, but they eventually expanded into southern Chihuahua, eastern Sinaloa, and northern Jalisco, Nayarit, and Zacatecas. By the time of the Spanish conquest of the Aztec Empire, Tepehuan lands spanned a large territory along the Sierra Madre Occidental. Tepehuán groups are divided into the Ódami (Northern Tepehuán), Audam (Southwestern Tepehuán), and O'dam (Southeastern Tepehuán), each with their own language, culture, and beliefs.

== Name ==
Tepehuán, alternately Tepeguán, derives from the Nahuatl term Tēpēhuanih, meaning "Mountain Dwellers" or "Mountain People". The tepe element comes from Nahuatle tepetl (mountains), and huan coming from nemohuayan (dwelling) or from macehualtin (people). Endonyms from the Tepehuán language include O'dam (Southeastern Tepehuán), Audam (Southwestern Tepehuán), and Ódami (Northern Tepehuán).

== Tepehuán groups ==
They still retain some of their traditional customs. The northern Tepehuán numbered 18,249 in 2005, the southeastern, 10,600, and the southwestern, 8,700. The following groups of Tepehuán live in Mexico today:

=== Northern Tepehuán ===
Ódami, meaning “People of the Mountains”, "We The People", or "People of This Land", live in southern Chihuahua. Tepehuan means mountain people. Ódami use the term obhai to refer to mestizos or foreigners.

==== Government ====
The Tepehuan government is composed of a master general, several governors, six alternates, captains, sergeants, corporals, officers of justice, and prosecutors. Along with the captain-general, governors administer justice and intervene in resolving conflicts between people. The other members of Ódami government also involved in the administration of justice, while prosecutors are dedicated to clean the churches and partiers, the arrangement of the altar.

==== Fiestas ====
Each community has a ring other parties, introduced following the colonial evangelization that stewards are sponsored elected a year in advance to gather the necessary funds to pay for adornments and beef slaughtered in offering to saint commemorated.

=== Southern Tepehuán ===
O'dam means “People of the Mountains”, "We The People", or "People of This Land" in Southeastern Tepehuán and Audam means "We The People" or "People of This Land" in Southwestern Tepehuán, both groups live in the Sierra Madre Occidental in southern Durango and Zacatecas, northern Nayarit, Jalisco. The O'dam, also known as Tepehuanes South or South Tepeguanos are an ethno-linguistic group. The Tepehuanes name or Tepeguanes (as they were known in colonial times) is of Nahuatl origin and was imposed both by speakers of that language as by the Spanish in the sixteenth century. Linguistically, O'dam and Audam belong to the Tepiman branch of the Uto-Aztecan language family, in the same branch as Ódami (Northern Tepehuan).

While Southern Tepehuan people have a historical and linguistic relation to the Ódami people in southern Chihuahua, today they are distinct groups with different cultures and languages.

==== Geographic and demographic data ====
The South Tepehuanes live in the municipalities of Mezquital, Pueblo Nuevo, Tepehuanes, and Chinacates in the state of Durango, in the town of Huajicori in Nayarit. El Mezquital-San Pedro River divides the area forming two areas in which Tepehuanes speak a different language variant, it serves as a proper name of the group, since the name "Tepehuán" or "Tepehuanes" word of Nahuatl origin, fared imposed by other Indians and Spaniards in colonial times. On the eastern side of the river we find O'dam speakers; on the western side speakers of Audam. Early in the communities of Santa María de Ocotán and Xoconostle, San Francisco and Santiago de Ocotán Teneraca, in the municipality of Mezquital, Durango. The Audam in Santa María Magdalena Taxicaringa in the same municipality; Chico Milpillas San Bernardino and San Francisco de Lajas in Pueblo Nuevo, Durango; while in the town of Huajicori, Nayarit, the community of San Andrés Milpillas Grande is located. Then, the language of this group is the Southern Tepehuan with two linguistic variants, O'dam (or Tepehuán Southeast ) and Audam (or Tepehuán south - west). The Census of Population and Housing, INEGI, 2005, reports a total of 21,720 speakers of "Southern Tepehuán" (different from Northern Tepehuán) over 5 years, of which 17,499 also speak Spanish.

- Southeastern Tepehuán (about 10,600 speakers, live in southeast Durango and adjacent areas, their cultural and religious center was Santa Maria Ocotán)
- Southwestern Tepehuán (about 8,700 speakers, live in southwest Durango and adjacent areas)

== Population ==
According to figures from the last population census of the 37,953 Tepehuanes, 18, 699 speak Spanish in addition to their native language and 3,573 are monolingual. You will often see cases of trilingual Tepehuáns especially in ethnic areas where some learn another Indigenous language, whether frequent treatment or by joining families (marriages between Tepehuanes, Tarahumara, Mexicanero, Huichol, Cora Indians, and mestizos are given).

== Beliefs ==
=== Ódami ===
The amalgam of Tepehuan and Catholic beliefs, ceremonies, practices, and myth is a kind of folk Catholicism with strong aboriginal components. A single creator, called "God Our Father," is accompanied by a number of other deities of ancient origin. The Lord of the Deer is named Kukúduli and is responsible for success in hunting. When someone dies, Úgai is a spirit that appears as a light in the sky, and another god, in the mountains, takes the form of an owl as a herald of death. There is also a spirit that is the master of the wind. Mythology includes tales of the Cocotyomes, a group of giants who ate children. The church and churchyard are the center of Sunday meetings, which are important for the dispensation of justice and the sharing of information and tradition.

==== Practitioners ====
As a spiritual intermediary, the shaman-curer is called bajadios, "he who brings God down." The term is derived from Spanish. The Tarahumara refer to this specialist as overúame; there must be a similar term in the language of the Tepehuan, but it is not recorded in the literature. Not only a diagnostician and healer of illness, the shaman is reputed to see the unseen and is called upon in many instances, such as when a valuable object has been lost. The shaman makes entreaties to the supernatural through the performance of a kind of séance. Courses of action are often revealed to him afterward in a dream. Tesguino (maize beer) is used in curing and blessing, in addition to its communal functions.

==== Ceremonies ====
Like the mestizo communities in the region, the Tepehuan observe and perform the customary Catholic pastoral dramas, introduced by the Jesuits in colonial times, during Christmas, Holy Week, and the October fiestas of San Francisco. The fiestas have an urban, mestizo phase and a Tepehuan phase, with the two groups working together on occasion. The fiestas consist of ritual activities surrounding defense and ultimate destruction of the figure of Judas and groups of participants called fariseos who engage in sham battles. There are also ceremonies led by the shaman to ask for good crops, to show reverence for the dead, and to petition for the physical well-being of both people and animals. The festivities are lively affairs with much dancing, the placing of offerings of food in front of a cross, and an ample supply of tesguino, an alcoholic beverage of fermented maize sprouts. Some ceremonies are held in secret with all outsiders excluded. In one of the Ódami ritual all of the people from the community make a circle around a fire, and everyone provides tobacco for a Sacred Pipe, the people (Tepehuános and also another tribal group) that are present during the ritual smoke from the Sacred Pipe. The Sacred Pipe was/is to make treaties with other tribes, preparing for war, or to please the gods.

=== O'dam and Audam ===
The Tepehuan have accepted Catholicism while maintaining aspects of their original religious precepts, an example of what anthropologists call "compartmentalism." This means that the two religions are practiced separately at different times of the year, with different rituals, and for different purposes. Catholics are served by a resident priest at San Bernardino, who also serves the surrounding areas. Other communities are served by visiting missionaries who arrive before Easter Sunday and stay several weeks.

A traditional pantheon of gods is syncretized in name and ritual with Catholic religious figures. Dios Padre (God the Father) is associated with the sun, whereas Jesús Nazareno (Jesus the Nazarene) is identified with the moon. Madre María (the Holy Mother) is represented by several figures, one of which is the Virgin of Guadalupe. Like other Indians in Mexico, the Southern Tepehuan celebrate the Christian holy days of Easter, the Feast of the Virgin of Guadalupe (12 December), Christmas, and village saints' days with spirited fiestas that are predominantly Mexican in character, during which the standard matachines are danced.

The elote (tender maize) First Fruits Fiesta is a non-Christian celebration that takes place in early October; fresh maize cannot be eaten until this festival is held. This fiesta is a thanksgiving ceremony and is one of the ceremonies which sets the Tepehuan apart from mestizo culture in Durango. Such distinctive Tepehuan ceremonies of fertility or thanksgiving are called Mitotes in Spanish, or Xiotahl in the Tepehuan language. Shamans function as directors of these sacred ceremonies during the fiestas and as curers. For five days there is fasting and much prayer. On the fifth night there is a grand display of ritual dancing, and, when the sun rises, the celebrants break their fast by eating food that has been set as offerings at the east end of the dance platform, on an altar dedicated to the rising sun. Mitotes are not as frequent nor as extravagant as they were in the past.

Today Mitotes are held, on average, three times a year, in accordance with the agricultural cycle (to appeal for protection against the harsh dry winter, to bless the spring sowing, to give thanks for the fall harvest) and on other occasions, including the blessing of newly elected officers. During times of drought a special Mitote may be given to ask for rain. Traditional native Mitotes are more reverent occasions of abstinence and prayer, whereas mestizo-influenced fiestas are opportunities for revelry and mescal drinking.

Each family and community has a patio where ceremonies are conducted. At both the village and the apellido-group level, there is an officer called the jefe del patio who organizes and leads the Mitotes. The jefe of the apellido group—almost always an elderly male shaman—is in charge of special apellido festivals, which are celebrated by the production of a xiotahl in May and October. At these times, recently born children are ritually inducted into the apellido group, and young adults of 15 years of age are recognized as adults of the group. Some feel that the shamans held ruling power in ancient Tepehuan culture. It is traditional that there be a female jefe del patio in both apellidos groups and territorial villages to preside over the affairs of female members.

== Culture ==
=== Clothing ===
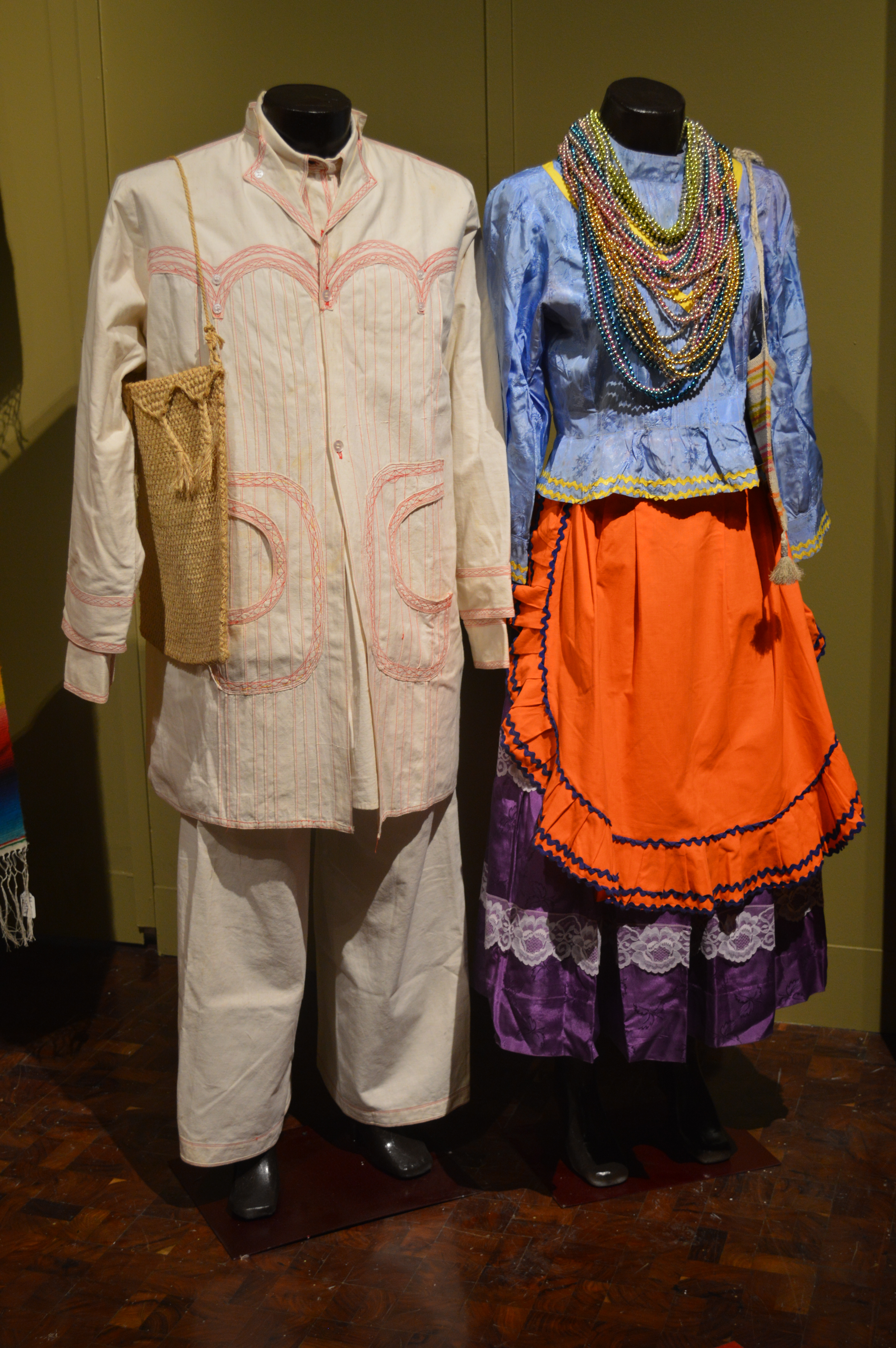
Traditional male and female Tepehuán dress from Durango

Today most men wear jeans, shirt and cowboy hat and sandals. Traditional clothing, worn by some men and more women, is very simple in the case of the first and very colorful in the latter. The male attire consists of a shirt, pants and blankets. Blankets in Northern Tepehuán are called kutum and sawira, respectively. In most communities, these items have a simple decoration in a colorful thread used to sew the hems and folds. Even in places like San Francisco de Ocotán, it is customary to tack pants, various multicolor tissues headbands, from the hem to the knee. The traditional hat, known as bonam, is made of soyate fabric with a circular shape. There are some variations in different communities. Like traditional dress, very few people these days use the leather and three holes Susak huaraches, although in some communities use is mandatory in ceremonies as mitote. The women's dress consists of three main parts: a skirt or springcity, a blouse with long sleeves and an apron around the waist. The fabrics are satin-like and decorated with lace and colored ribbons. The long socks use of bright colors is very widespread, roasted like plastic shoes. The outfit is enriched with long hair combs, beaded necklaces and earrings or other accessories. Men and women use traditional bags to complement their outfit.

=== Arts ===
==== Ódami ====
Crafts and industry include basket and mat weaving and the making of rope and hats. There is also the manufacture of small violins, an art learned from the Jesuits. Skilled carvers make bowls, utensils, and bows and arrows, used mainly for costume and ceremony, and many other wooden articles. Skins of various animals are utilized for the manufacture of sandals, sleeping mats, carrying baskets, and other items useful in everyday activities. Canteens, bowls, and dippers are made from common gourds. Cooking pots are expertly made from clay. A wide variety of clothing, adornments, and other household items, such as blankets, are woven from domestic wool or sewn from purchased cloth.

=== Music ===
==== Ódami ====
Music is important in Tepehuan life. Old Spanish matachines tunes, songs with Tepehuan themes sung in Tepehuan, and popular Spanish-Mexican songs are played at dances and fiestas on homemade violins, gourd rattles, ankle rattles, reed flutes, rasping sticks, and drums. Oral tradition is carried on by some adult members of the communities in the spirited performance of folklore. Stories include animal tales of regional origin, as well as local renderings of familiar tales of Old World derivation.

==== O'dam and Audam ====
By Jesuit accounts, precolonial musical instruments that were played during dances and ceremonies included rasping sticks, rattles, and reed or ceramic flutes. These instruments along with the musical bow played on a gourd sounder, are still used to provide music during the ceremonial mitote. The drum and the violin, an instrument of Spanish origin, are added when playing corridos and other popular Mexican songs at the fiestas. Clay pipes and incense burners similar to pre-Spanish objects that have been unearthed are sometimes used by curers for their healing rituals. Although some pottery is still made, it is, for the most part, strictly functional and undecorated, and weaving has all but vanished.

== Medicine, death, and afterlife ==
In Ódami tradition, health and illness are often linked to spiritual factors, including the influence of spirits. These conditions are traditionally interpreted through the calls of specific mountain birds, known as Tukurai, Kukuvuri, and Tokovi. To treat various ailments, the Ódami utilize an extensive knowledge of indigenous ethnobotany, employing roots, seeds, and leaves from over fifty-six plant families in the form of teas and poultices.

The soul exists in the heart, but leaves the body when a person is asleep or unconscious. Upon death, the soul lingers around the house of the dead person for a month until a fiesta is held as a way of saying good-bye. After this, the house may be abandoned in fearful respect for the vicious ill will of a returned soul. If all goes well, the soul departs to live in the sky. The church cemetery is the usual place of burial. A coherent description of the Tepehuan conception of the afterlife has not yet been recorded.

=== O'dam and Audam ===
When illness strikes, anyone in the family of the afflicted may petition the supernatural through prayer, but more serious conditions require the efforts of shaman curers. These individuals are endowed with the gift of healing, may be of either sex but are usually male, and specialize in the treatment of specific infirmities. Well-known curers are often consulted by mestizo neighbors. A young person who is called to be a shaman will train for five years as an apprentice to an older shaman. During this time he learns ritual prayers and makes an ascetic retreat of seclusion for one month each year, nourished only by plain tortillas, water, meditation, and prayer.

Treatment entails a long, elaborate ceremony that normally lasts for five days. The curer fasts, prays, and chants long routinized orations. The sick person is massaged and has smoke from the curer's pipe blown over his or her body. Typical of shamanistic healing in this part of the world, the ritual involves sucking the material object that caused the disease from the body of the patient, the use of eagle feathers for sweeping the patient, incantations including invocation of Catholic saints, the symbolic use of the cross and images of saints, and the use of various herbs. Ritualized confession of the patient, the participation of other family members as beneficiaries of healing, and special healing mitotes, in which a large number of people are cured en masse by the spiritually charged aura of the ceremony, are some of the curing practices with wider social dimensions.

The malady that brings death is believed to be both spiritual and physical in nature, a result of sickness and sorcery. Throughout the life cycle, intervals of five are of significant symbolic importance: note the lengths of the premarriage visits of the parents (five successive days), the shaman's training period (five years), and mitotes (five days). A special five-day ceremony, which is conducted by the shaman and closely involves the surviving family members, marks the end of a life on earth and concludes with the driving of the soul out from the body and into heaven. In this capacity as funeral director, the shaman's role has been interpreted as that of a practitioner whose principal responsibility is to prevent the soul from coming back to its corporeal home. The usual place of interment of the dead is the village burial ground, which is commonly located in the churchyard.

== Settlements ==
=== Ódami ===
Today the Northern Tepehuan are closer to the Tarahumara cultural pattern than to that of the Southern Tepehuan, and relations with the Tarahumara are plainly evident. In a few communities, the two groups live together in bicultural and bilingual situations, but the precise relationship between them is unclear. The Northern Tepehuan are found in the municipios of Guadalupe y Calvo, Morelos, and Balleza on the southern edge of the Tarahumara country, across the Río Verde. Land is communally held in Ejidos or Comunidades, with Tepehuan holding title separately, or sometimes with mestizos. They live in groups of small named settlements, called rancherías, surrounding pueblos, or small towns that act as social and political centers. Rancherías are small and widely dispersed, consisting of the separate dwellings of four or five families. Houses in the tierra templada are constructed of timber in small clusters on the great mesas. In the tierra caliente they are made of stone-and-mud mortar and are usually located along the streams that lead down into the canyons.

=== O'dam and Audam ===
Each Comunidad is a territorial and political unit. At the center of a Comunidad is a main town that is the religious-political center for the surrounding anexos (named villages) and isolated rancherías belonging to the Comunidad. A ranchería consists of clustered houses surrounded by widely scattered small farm plots. The towns act as central foci for government, social, and religious rituals and are official headquarters for holding elections and discussing matters affecting the Comunidad. In addition to a town's public and administrative buildings, there are also a church or chapel, a school, and a community kitchen. Elected officials live in these centers during their terms of office.

A typical Southern Tepehuan dwelling is a rectangular two-room construction built on a platform of earth that has been prepared by continual watering, sweeping, and hollowing out. The walls are made of stone and adobe and the roof is thatched with grass. One room is used for cooking and the other for sleeping. There are variations in the construction of homes in different villages, depending on available materials. Where sawmills are accessible, lumber is used in the construction of community and residential buildings.

== Economy ==
=== Ódami ===
Practically every household grows food for its own consumption on small plots. Maize, squashes, and beans are the staple crops whereas wheat, barley, potatoes, oats, and peas are also commonly grown. Tobacco and chilies are grown in the lowlands. The dibble stick and wooden plows drawn by oxen are adjuncts to farming. A dibble stick is a sharpened pole used to punch a hole in the plowed earth or a slash-and-burn plot for planting seeds. One season for cultivating is available in the highlands compared to two in the hotter lowlands. Maize fields are cultivated separately from garden plots dedicated to the other vegetables. Old World fruit trees, introduced by the missionaries, are also tended near the settlements. In the highlands, there are small groves of fig, pomegranate, peach, and apple trees, and, in the hot canyon lands, there are orange and lemon trees. Gathering wild foods is still an important activity as well. Seasonal wild fruits, piñon nuts, walnuts, and edible species of acorns are collected, as is crude honey. Certain insects, reptiles, grubs, and the occasional rattlesnake round out the choices of consumable undomesticated resources. Hunting and trapping also supplement the diet, and deer and wild turkeys are the most highly prized game.

The raising of chickens and, to a lesser extent, turkeys and pigs provides additional sustenance. Livestock are a source of wealth and prestige. Horses—ridden for transportation—and burros and mules—used as pack animals—are much valued. There are many sheep and goats, which are prized for their wool and as food during fiestas. For the most part, the family is the unit of production and consumption, but this configuration is changing. One frequent pattern is an unfortunate circle of need. During hard times, some of the maize harvest is sold, but because most families only grow enough in their gardens to feed themselves, the maize is bought back at an inflated price before the next harvest. Off-farm income usually consists of low pay for unskilled labor. Those who take jobs in the mines receive a slightly better wage. Forestry is an increasingly important economic factor in the region.

==== Trade ====
There is little evidence of much trade and commercial exchange. Between Indians and mestizos, there was some petty trading of subsistence commodities. The household is the basic production unit, but exchange of labor (e.g., for house building or harvesting activities) accompanies beer-drinking festivals similar to the tesguinadas of the Tarahumara.

=== O'dam and Audam ===
The great variation in elevation (from 600 meters at the deepest point in the vast Mezquital Canyon to 3,250 meters at the crown of Cerro Gordo) produces a great variation in plants and wildlife. The choices of cultivable crops are extremely limited because of the lack of water and topsoil; another determinant is the rugged terrain cut by two deep rivers, which flow southward through Nayarit into the Pacific. Deep canyons create different ecosystems and dictate the types of crops that can be grown. Pine and hardwood forests cover high plateaus. Deep valleys, with hot, dry climates and tropical flora and fauna in the lowlands alternate with the higher, temperate zones that experience heavy rainfall in the summer and frost in winter.

Agriculture and pastoralism are the main economic resources, although the lumber industry has made a minor contribution since about 1980. Maize, beans, and two kinds of squash are the traditionally cultivated crops and remain the dietary staples, given that the rocky mountains and the scarcity of water leave only a trifling amount of arable land and permit little diversification. Despite the importance of maize as a dietary staple, the Southern Tepehuan do not grow sufficient quantities to feed themselves. Around the beginning of the twentieth century, it was reported that cotton was grown for ceremonial purposes, but this practice has been abandoned. Heavy on tortillas, beans, cheese, and other farm products that need no irrigation, the Tepehuan diet is fortified by a good deal of gathered foods. These include roots, wild tubers, fruits, greens, and mushrooms. The constraints of the land greatly impinge both on the economy and on patterns of settlement and migration.

Along with the pines that support the lumber industry are banana, plum, and avocado trees that are native to the area, as well as the introduced apple and peach species. Also in the more tropical areas are found mangos and guayabo fruits. Most families keep chickens. Cattle and goats are fairly common, and an accumulation of them is a mark of wealth. Other domesticated animals include sheep, turkeys, pigs, horses, and donkeys. Hunting and fishing are less important today than in the past. Firearms for hunting are luxuries that not many can afford. Cattle and most available wild game, such as deer, are saved for ceremonial use.

==== Trade ====
The Southern Tepehuan engage in a modest amount of trade and commerce. Fruits, livestock, maize, and mescal are brought to Mexican markets for sale or trade. Household goods such as cloth, cooking utensils, and tools are procured at occasional market outings.

== Division of labor ==
=== Ódami ===
The household division of labor by sex and age is generally egalitarian, with the exception that Tepehuan women have more numerous and diverse responsibilities, laboring both in and around the house and in the fields. Along with the usual household and family-related chores, women also weave, make pottery and baskets, milk cows and goats, and participate in the harvesting of maize. Most of the heavy work—such as cutting and preparing logs, house building, and preparing the fields—is by men. Hat making, basket weaving, and rope making are also generally men's activities. Women weave blankets and sash-belts on a horizontal loom.

==== Land tenure ====
Ejidos are communal properties established by the Mexican constitution after the 1917 Revolution. Large estates were broken up and either Indigenous or peasant residents took possession. Neighbors or interested others could apply for membership. Membership is not hereditary—continued membership depends upon residence and continued use of the land—but the rules are bent for absent friends or relatives. Land may stay within a family for an extended period of time, but because a long fallow period is required for most plots, land frequently changes hands between families.

Comunidades are an older type of communal organization found in both Durango and Chihuahua. Membership is entirely Indigenous, unlike that of ejidos. Members, usually males, are approved for membership by the asamblea, which is the governing body. Occasionally mestizos are allowed membership because of intermarriage into—and long-standing loyalty to—the community. Membership in the comunidad is preserved, and passed on to the widow, also in contrast to ejido membership.

Land-tenure law promulgated in 1992 (Article 27 of the Mexican constitution) includes changes that will affect the future of rural and Indigenous people. Communal lands have now become rentable, can be divided and owned individually, and sold or pledged as collateral for loans. Each ejido or comunidad will be able to make a decision among its members whether to hold title to their lands individually or collectively. Indigenous comunidades and ejidos appear to favor the option of adopting comunidad status in lieu of privatization.

==== Kinship ====
Descent and inheritance are reported as patrilateral, with exceptions made in the passing of property to daughters at times. This may not be the case, since the Indigenous pattern for neighboring groups is bilateral and gender egalitarian, with male and female inheriting land bilaterally and with the spouses making homes in either or both pieces of inherited land. The reported patrilaterality, and certainly patronymy, may be influenced by the dominant mestizo pattern and sampling bias. Kinship is probably reckoned bilaterally, which means that relatives on father's and mother's side of the family are counted as relatives. There are no lineages, clans, moieties, or other such descent groups.

==== Kinship terminology ====
The kinship terminology is descriptive (tends to combine elementary terms) with distinctions made among each of Ego's four grandparents, mother, mother's sister, mother's brother, father, father's sister, and father's brother. These relatives are also categorized by age and sex, but in Ego's generation, cousins and siblings are not distinguished by sex or in any other manner. Except in Ego's generation, in which brother-in-law and sister-in-law are designated by the same term, affinal kinship terms are descriptive. Ego's children are distinguished by sex but not by relative age. Terms of reference and terms of address differ. Elder brother, for example, is addressed with a special term of respect. In other cases, Spanish personal names are used. Kinship terms are not affected by the sex of the speaker. Godparents ( padrinos ) are selected when children are baptized in the church, but since there are no church weddings or confirmations, there are no other godparents.

=== O'dam and Audam ===
These trading ventures and most other economic matters are the exclusive domain of males. For the most part, the division of labor by gender falls along the same lines as that of the Northern Tepehuan. Men perform the heavy farm and forestry work, and women maintain the home, weaving clothing and household items from wool, cotton, and maguey fiber and participating in the harvest. At a very young age, children begin to herd goats and cattle. Labor exchange occurs within extended families, and communal labor is required for certain tasks, especially during communal rituals.

==== Kinship ====
The household is the main unit of production and consumption—with the occasional addition of others from what appears to be an extended patrilineal family, often localized in the same ranchería, neighborhood, or village. Along with the offices and loyalties of the towns and anexos are the apellido group alliances, which crosscut village boundaries. These are associations (sometimes three or four in a village) of individuals sharing the same Spanish surname. Children of the same parents often have different surnames. Apellido groups may be the remaining shells of nonlocalized patrilineal clans of antiquity.

== Marriage and family ==
=== Ódami ===
Neither church nor state influences marriages except where rancherías are located close to active missions. Marriage is generally a matter of mutual consent and results in a fragile alliance. Some ethnologists report that marriages are not arranged by the families but are usually enacted through the custom of "robbing," an old Hispanic practice common throughout rural Mexico, in which the groom surreptitiously brings the bride to the home of his father and keeps her there until the anger of her family subsides. Except for acculturated families, the Tepehuan pattern much resembles that of surrounding groups: marriages are matters of consensual cohabitation, followed by social acknowledgment by the immediate social group, and at any time afterwards, easily severed by either party.

==== Domestic unit ====
The household unit consists of the nuclear family of parents and children, with the occasional addition of other extended relatives such as a widowed parent. The rancherías composed of adjacent households may include relatives of either parent. The married couple lives with the husband's parents for about a year until the groom receives land from his father, upon which a separate dwelling is erected. The ideal model of patrilocality, however, is often modified by the acquisition of land from another part of the ejido or from the parents of the girl.

==== Inheritance ====
Inheritance is reported by some ethnologists as patrilineal, but land and property may be passed on to daughters in the absence of male inheritors. The actual pattern is probably bilateral, in consonance with surrounding aboriginal patterns, and coinciding with the choice of bilateral residence by the couple after marriage.

=== O'dam and Audam ===
Few, if any, marriage restrictions have been recorded. Marriages are usually arranged by the parents of the couple and take place before either the bride or the groom reaches the age of 20 and, often, at a younger age. The parents of the prospective groom pay ceremonial visits to the family of the chosen bride for five consecutive nights, and on the fifth night the girl's parents decide whether to accept or reject the offer of marriage. Formerly, the newly married husband went to work for his wife's relatives for five months. After this, the couple either went to live with his family or set up their own household. This is not the only pattern of marriage; other variations may involve the groom appearing before a native official called an ixkai with his hands tied. After a brief invocation the man is untied, and the couple go to live at the groom's paternal home. As soon as possible, the couple construct their own home near the groom's paternal residence.

==== Domestic unit and inheritance ====
People live as either nuclear or patrilineal extended families, with members added who are related through either descent or marriage. Houses and privately owned land property are ordinarily passed down from father to son.

== Socialization ==
=== Ódami ===
The best way to depict Tepehuan sociopolitical organization is to visualize it as nested in hierarchical strata of national, state, local, and cultural sociopolitical systems. The matter is further complicated by the presence of mixed populations of Tepehuan, Tarahumara, and mestizos wherein officeholders represent the dominant group in any single community. There are national and state representatives of various agencies, ranging from those who control Indian affairs to those who maintain roads and members of the state judiciary. Locally, the complexity of organization begins with the municipio. Elected leaders include the president of the municipio and those in charge of policing and other services. Land-tenure organizations such as ejidos and comunidades have leadership structures and responsibility for—and control of—land; the comunidad is more likely to have total Indian autonomy. Ejidos are governed by a president of the ejido commission, a secretary, a treasurer, and a president of the oversight council ( consejo de vigilancia ). Comunidades have a governor ( gobernador ), a vice governor ( segundo gobernador ), auxiliary secretary ( seer exario auxiliar ), and a police commissioner ( comisario de policía ). They make decisions in group meetings (asambleas), at which all male and some female members vote.

Pueblos are townships that act as centers of governance for surrounding rancherías. The pueblo hierarchy combines elements of ancient and colonial ritual and bureaucracy. Each gobernancia (pueblo) elects a gobernador, an assistant for a two-year term, and other officials dealing with policing. The capitán-general, appointed by the gobernadores, oversees all six regions, and along with an assistant and seven justicias, is the guardian of order and justice. Traditionally, punishment for serious offenses was public whipping in the churchyard, clearly another European custom learned from the Spanish missionaries. Meetings are held every other Sunday when the gobernador calls together the justicias to hear and resolve complaints. A lower tier of officials serves shorter terms and carries out ceremonial duties dealing with the maintenance of the church and the organizing of fiestas. The residential units, the rancherías, do not have a governing structure. The only person with quasi-authority and influence is the native curer.

Some towns are divided into subsections by common references to "the people of arriba " (those who live upstream) and "the people of abajo " (those who live downstream). This division is most apparent in the loyalties and rivalries that are expressed during ceremonies, the popular foot races and ball games that take place during fiestas, and in the elaborate political hierarchy. Arriba-abajo distinctions are common throughout Latin American small towns and are not moiety divisions in the strict ethnological sense; however, they may be utilized in this manner by some Indigenous groups.

=== O'dam and Audam ===
Sociopolitical organization is complicated by the presence of sometimes conflicting forms of land tenure and systems introduced at different times by the Spaniards and Mexicans that crosscut traditional organization. There are two forms of communal land tenure present in the region. The comunidad is an older, Indigenous form, in which land is held patrilineally and inherited by sons or widows. The ejido is a form of communal land-tenure system provided for in the constitution of 1917, following the Mexican Revolution. It allocated communal lands to applicants—whether Indian, mestizo, or together—to be held as long as the land is used economically. Under the ejidal system, land is not officially or legally inheritable, but actual practice often violates this proviso. An elected body of officials governs the ejido and its economic business. Residential units found within ejidos and comunidades include towns and rancherías.

Comunidades are governed by a popularly elected asamblea (assembly of voting members), who decide upon matters presented and select minor political and economic officials. The asamblea officers include the traditional gobernador, representatives from each of the anexos, and others who act as police and church assistants, as well as those who announce and conduct religious ceremonies and similar activities. Overlapping this group—and conflicting with them—are ejidal officers, in those instances where the ejido controls the land-tenure system. A comisario is elected for a three-year term to transact business with lumber companies (where sawmills exploiting ejidal forest land are present); other officials supervise sawmills, work in the forest, watch over forest exploitation according to established rules, and deal with officials of the Secretaría de la Reforma Agraria, the federal agency that oversees and adjudicates matters regarding ejidos.

The traditional gobernador (ixkai) is responsible for public works, supervision of communal work, maintaining public order, and ceremonies honoring the community's patron saint. In some communities he is also in charge of the xiotahl ritual (see "Religion and Expressive Culture"), judges minor cases of crime and family disputes, and imposes punishment as necessary. The gobernador segundo acts in the place of the former in his absence. Regidores act as the gobernador's messengers. Alguaciles are in charge of keeping order and dispensing punishment (such as whippings) in some cases. The topil is an assistant. The position of teportado is filled by a youth who accompanies the governor during fiestas and calls the community by beating a drum. The kapchin is charged with matters dealing with boundaries. The alférez and others are assistants in communal religious and political matters, for instance, keeping order during Holy Week.

Religious festivals are held on days designated by the Catholic church (e.g., Holy Week) and to celebrate the patron saint's day. Mayordomías, officers within a cargosystem hierarchy, are in charge of this important festival. Mayordomos are in control, with assistants called priostas; pasioneros accompany the image of the saint, and a fiscal is the sacristan in charge of the images of the saints. The numbers and duties of these officials vary from community to community. Generally, they are in charge of the appropriate traditional performance of the ceremonies, the operation of communal kitchens, and keeping order during the ritual.

The political system is overlaid with systems of personal influence, municipal jurisdictions and officials, and political activities dealing with national, state, and municipal elections. Unofficial governance, influence, and power is also imposed by caciques, local bosses who enforce their rule through violence and torture. The municipio is divided into manzanas, or cuarteles, each with an appointed chief who may act as a parallel authority and often displaces the traditional ixkai. A Supreme Council of the Tepehuan has been created to provide a single voice for the whole of the Southern Tepehuan, but it seems to have little authority. Political parties such as the Partido del Pueblo Mexicano (PPM) and others are making their appearance in some communities to oppose the ruling state party, the Partido Revolucionario Institucional (PRI).

== History ==
=== Ódami ===
Today's relative obscurity belies an apparently long and once prominent Tepehuan regional presence. The Tepehuan of Chihuahua are the northern descendants of an aboriginal group whose broad territory ranged from north of the Río Verde in Chihuahua southward through Durango into the contemporary states of Nayarit and Jalisco. Archival evidence suggests that at the time of the arrival of the Spanish conquerors, the Tepehuan were probably the largest and most important tribe in the Sierra Madre Occidental. About half a millennium before the Conquest, their ancestors hunted and gathered in the desert region near the border between Arizona and Sonora before migrating, along with other Southern Uto-Aztecan groups, southward into the mountainous regions of northwestern Mexico, where they began to rely on farming.

After the conquest of central the Aztec Empire, Spaniards moved northward, mining and establishing haciendas and missions in Zacatecas and Durango. In Durango, they ruptured the unity of Northern and Southern Tepehuan by eliminating the central Durango groups northward to Chihuahua. By the end of the sixteenth century, a few miners, missionaries, and soldiers had penetrated southern Chihuahua. The Franciscans, in 1560, were the first order to work with the Tepehuan in the Santa Barbara region of southern Chihuahua. The Jesuits previously ministered to the Tepehuan in central and southern Durango. They entered the northern territory in 1610 and began congregating the Tepehuan into mission towns, and, by 1708, had established missions at Baborigame, Nabogame, and Guadalupe y Calvo. Over a hundred years of isolation followed the expulsion of the Jesuits in 1767. The overextended Franciscans, now responsible for the whole region, maintained modest sway. The Jesuits returned at the beginning of the twentieth century. The Tepehuan are usually described as "nominally Catholic," given that the religion practiced is an amalgamation of Hispanic and Indigenous elements. Some Indigenous groups do not practice any form of Catholicism. Perhaps the most important consequence of Tepehuan relations with the Church is the local acquisition of European plants, livestock, and technology.

The convergence of Indian and mestizo culture was a process driven by the economic exploitation of resources. Chihuahua's first mine and first hacienda were established by thirty Spanish families in 1575, initiating mining and grazing as the future primary industries of the region. Sometimes Indians worked in mines and farms out of choice, but more often they were forced laborers or slaves. At first, wool clothing was a great attraction to volunteer laborers, but impressed labor and harsh treatment soon became unbearable. Beginning in the first decade of the seventeenth century, uprisings led by the Tepehuan resulted in severe repression by the Spaniards. Soon, Santa Barbara, with 7,000 inhabitants, became the largest town in the province of Nueva Vizcaya, even larger than the city of Durango, to the south. From this outpost, the subjugation of the northern territory continued over the next century. The whole of the seventeenth century was one of revolt across the northern frontier by practically every Indian group living north of Durango. Spaniards retreated to protected outposts. Priests met martyrdom. Soon these rebellions were put down, and in the nineteenth century northward expansion continued. Mines, new towns, and presidios, were created, the Jesuits were expelled, and all Indigenous peoples—except for a few remote groups—were generally pacified.

Excluding a few settlements such as those at Baborigame and Guadalupe y Calvo, the region of the northern Tepehuan remained mostly isolated and little settled, which allowed the Indigenous people to follow a simple subsistence pattern of life relatively unmolested. Even during the turbulent nineteenth century, when revolution and independence consumed most of Mexico, the Indigenous people were left very much alone by a Mexico otherwise occupied. Independence from Spain in 1821 resulted in much infighting in the central government, as opposing parties competed for control. Lack of funds meant that soldiers on the far northern frontier were not paid, and it was difficult to influence politics in such remote regions without providing the minimum of services. For Mexico, the nineteenth century culminated in the loss of more than one-third of its territory to the United States. During the nineteenth century, Apache invaders began to drive a wedge between the people living in the high Sierra and the Pima Alta cultures in the north. As mountain dwellers, the Northern Tepehuan, like the Tarahumara, were able to defend themselves against displacement by these Apache raiders. Mostly, however, they were far removed from the major centers of Apache raiding in northern Chihuahua.

The twentieth century has been even less auspicious. The Tepehuan have remained isolated, except for recent decades. In 1952 there was an attempt to bring the Tepehuan into the fold of mainstream culture and economy when the federal government installed an Indian Coordinating Center at Guachochi, across the Río Verde from the Tepehuan homeland. Through the Center, the National Indian Institute has followed a policy of assimilation. It administers various social and welfare services but is hampered by the remoteness of the region. In southwestern Chihuahua, Indians are outnumbered by mestizos by as much as three to one and this ratio increased as economic enterprises grew in the 1970 and 1980s. Logging in this densely forested area has become particularly important as an alternative to the heavily exploited Tarahumara woodlands north of the Río Verde. Forest roads and a paved highway from Parral to Guadalupe y Calvo have also opened the region to the negative impacts of illegal drug harvesting and transportation. Drug traffickers are having a profound impact on local Indigenous groups, and many Indians are fleeing to more remote regions to follow a hunting-and-gathering mode of life.

=== O'dam and Audam ===
The Tepehuan were hunters and gatherers who came from near the present border between the modern states of Sonora and Arizona, the originating place for all Tepiman speakers. In their present location, they were influenced by Mesoamerican culture, the culture of the more urbanized people to the south, especially in their acceptance of farming, ceramics, platform architecture, and religion. At the time of the arrival of Spaniards in the Durango region in the mid-sixteenth century, the Tepehuan were horticulturists who supplemented their subsistence with hunting and gathering during certain times of the year.

The Spaniards introduced the use of oxen in farming; the raising of cattle, sheep, and goats; the use of animal fertilizer; and new religious and political forms and clothing styles. Spanish occupation and control of the central part of present-day Durango state, around the city of Durango and immediately to the north, created a split between the Southern and Northern Tepehuan. Although there is no lucid setting apart of the two Tepehuan in the early Spanish records, there is no real evidence to confirm that they were much closer culturally at the time of the Conquest than they are now. The distance of several hundred kilometers between the two divisions may have been sufficient to create the cultural and linguistic differences that now exist. Considered separately, it is apparent that a long period of isolation was necessary to produce the remarkable language dissimilarity. Although it is generally observed that the Northern Tepehuan are closer to the culture pattern of the Indians of the Greater Southwest and the Southern Tepehuan are closer to that of Mesoamerica, appraised as a whole, the Tepehuan emerge as a kind of bridge between the two. Today the Southern Tepehuan seem particularly close to the Cora and the Huichol in the neighboring states of Nayarit and Jalisco.

Upon their arrival, the Spaniards immediately subjugated the Indians, forcing them to labor in mines and on farms, imposing virtual slavery, brutality, and rape, and confiscating their goods and lands. Following the era of the gold seekers, the missionizing process became a concerted and intense effort in Durango between 1607 and 1615. After the establishment of missions and the settlement of Indians in towns, the Spaniards built garrisons to protect their settlements and haciendas to farm and tend cattle. This encroachment was not passively received. Continuous trouble culminated in a bloody uprising from 1616 to 1618, the first large—and possibly the most devastating—Indian rebellion in the border regions in the seventeenth century. The Spanish settlement that is now Durango city came under siege, and there was fighting at Mezquital in the south and at Canatlán in the north. By early 1621, pacification was well enough under way to allow the Spanish appointment of forty-six Tepehuan political officers to govern the Indian communities. Although sporadic insurgency continued (raids on Spanish farms and ranches were common around Mezquital), the two decades that followed are seen as the time of conclusive efforts to quell significant resistance.

Drought and widespread epidemics in Southern Tepehuan towns in the late seventeenth century decreased the population and pushed many Tepehuan away from their native homes and closer toward Spanish settlements and influences, or further into the southern mountains. After the Spanish colonial administration expelled the Jesuits in 1767, a period of relative isolation allowed the Southern Tepehuan to produce an amalgamated, distinct culture. Continued inroads by mestizo culture, the seizing of lands, and continued poverty, as well as isolation in a rugged country, have ensured that this distinct culture would develop without interference from outside governmental agencies. The greatest threats to cultural integrity and survival today are changes in national land-tenure laws, the exploitation of forests, continued labor migration, and—most devastating—the invasion of Tepehuan lands by drug lords, who impose a regime of forced labor.

=== Pre-Columbian ===
The Tepehuán, Acaxee, and Xixime to their west shared common traits such as

“the cultivation of corn, beans, squash, chiles, and cotton adjacent to dispersed, small villages and settlements;…frequent warfare with associated ritual cannibalism; polytheism and worship of idols; the presence of shamans or ritual specialists (hechiceros and curandero); and a decentralized political structure that relied on the leadership of elders in peacetime and on war leaders to deal with outsiders.”

The Tepehuán suffered a series of devastating epidemics of European-introduced diseases in the years before the revolt. Epidemics were known to have occurred in their region in 1594, 1601–1602, 1606–1607, 1610, and 1616–1617. The Tepehuán and their neighbors may have been reduced in population by more than 80 percent by the epidemics, from a pre-Columbian population of more than 100,000 to fewer than 20,000, of which the Tepehuán may have been one-half of this total

=== Chichimeca War ===
During the Chichimeca War (1550–1590) the Tepehuán remained neutral although urged by the Chichimecas to join them in resistance to Spanish expansion. The Spanish failed to defeat the Chichimeca militarily and instituted a new policy called "peace by purchase" in which Catholic missionaries would be a major tool in pacifying hostile and semi-hostile Indians. Indians were to be supplied with food and tools and resettled into towns. Missionaries, rather than the military, would take on most of the responsibility for integrating the Indians into colonial New Spain and Christian society. The Acaxee and Xixime were the first to have this new Spanish policy applied to them and the Tepehuán would be next.

=== Tepehuán Revolt ===
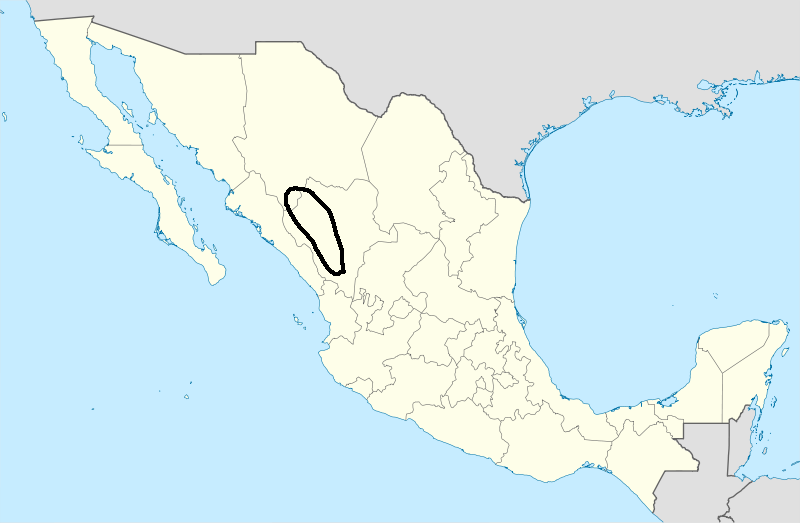

The Tepehuán Revolt from 1616 to 1620 was a bloody and ultimately unsuccessful attempt by the Tepehuán, inspired by a messianic leader named Quautlatas, to rid their territory of the Spanish. On November 16, 1616, a wagon train traveling to Mexico City was attacked by the Tepehuán just outside Santa Catarina de Tepehuanes, a small village in the eastern foothills of the Sierra Madre Occidental. Thus began what Jesuit historian Andrés Pérez de Ribas called the revolt

"one of the greatest outbreaks of disorder, upheaval, and destruction that had been seen in New Spain...since the Conquest."

Before it was finished four years later, more than 200 Spaniards, 10 missionaries, an unknown number of Indians, Black slaves, and mestizos allied with the Spanish, and perhaps 4,000 Tepehuán died, many of hunger and disease, with destruction to property valued as much as a million pesos.

== Orientation ==
=== Ódami ===
The Northern Tepehuan refer to themselves as "Ódami." Although the etymology of the name "Tepehuan" is still a matter of contention, the word almost certainly stems from tepetl, the Nahuatl word for "mountain." The Northern Tepehuan are scattered over sparsely settled high woodlands and canyons in the southwestern corner of the northern Mexican state of Chihuahua. The Southern Tepehuan are separated from the Northern by several hundred kilometers, and are found in the rugged country of southern Durango.

The upper perimeter of Northern Tepehuan land is the Río Verde, flowing westward into Sinaloa and carving deep gorges into this remote part of the Sierra Madre Occidental. The average elevation is around 2,350 meters, but widely varying elevations make for a craggy terrain that is strikingly harsh and isolating. Travel into and within the coarsely contoured region is arduous; the few roads provide only limited accessibility. At the higher elevations are the pine-covered uplands referred to locally as the tierra templada (the temperate zone). Downslope is the tierra caliente (the warm country), the canyon expanses of poorer soil covered with shrubs and grasses.

Aside from linguistic similarity and some sharing of a type of communal organization, the Northern and Southern Tepehuan now differ remarkably in sociocultural attributes. This separation of two groups bearing the same name and sharing a parallel and arguably liminal position in the threshold between the Mesoamerican and the Southwestern cultural areas has propagated a mystique that has yet to be cleared up by definitive research. As of this writing, these groups, whose homeland is rugged and remote, remain little known and studied.

==== Demography ====
There are approximately 10,000 Tepehuan presently living in Chihuahua. (The 1990 census recorded 2,980 speakers of Tepehuan aged 5 years or older in Chihuahua.) Because of the difficulties of travel and the insufficiency of government services, an accurate count is hard to come by in this poor and isolated region of Mexico. As is common in other parts of the country, the elusiveness of numbers is also attributable to the elusiveness of definitions of ethnicity, about which Indians, mestizos, and the census takers hold conflicting views. Various aspects of affiliation, connection, and identity may be denied, embraced or overlooked by both the counters and the counted. In the past, inexperienced or ill-informed observation, mistaking subtle complexity for assimilation, has often misrepresented the Northern Tepehuan as completely mestizoized or simply lumped them with the Tarahumara, another local group. More recent work, however, has established that they remain a discrete culture with a distinct language, living as an Indigenous group, separate from—and coexisting—several thousand Tarahumara and tens of thousands of mestizo neighbors.

==== Linguistic Affiliation ====
The Tepehuan speak an Uto-Aztecan language. The languages of the Uto-Aztecan Family are more widely spoken than those of the five other major language families in the southwestern United States and northwestern Mexico. The language of the Northern Tepehuan is most closely related to that of the Southern Tepehuan, although their point of divergence has not been determined by linguists. Along with Pima and Papago (which are spoken in Arizona and northern Sonora), these languages comprise the Tepiman or Piman Group of the Sonoran Branch of the Uto-Aztecan Language Family.

=== O'dam and Audam ===
The Sierra Madre Occidental range cuts a north–south swath through northern Mexico, splitting the state of Durango into eastern and western parts. In extreme southwestern Durango, several hundred kilometers south of the land of the Northern Tepehuan of Chihuahua and across this mountainous rupture live the Southern Tepehuan. The sublime variance of the peaks and canyons rent from the earth by two rivers, the Mezquital and the Huazamota, and their tributaries, renders the discordant beauty of some of the roughest and most wondrous land in Mexico. This terrain makes communication possible only by unmaintained dirt roads and trails. Like the Northern Tepehuan, members of the Southern group call themselves "O'dam and Audam ("We the People" or "those who live in this place"). The name "Tepehuan" comes from the Nahuatl word tepetl (hill). Ethnographic work in this remote area is sparse, and although they have probably lived here for about a thousand years, the Tepehuan are relatively unknown to outsiders.

There are seven comunidades in Southern Tepehuan territory. Santa María Ocotán (Juktɨr), San Francisco Ocotán, Santiago Teneraca, and Santa María Magdalena de Taxicaringa are in the municipio of Mezquital, Durango. San Bernardino de Milpillas Chico and San Francisco de Lajas are in the municipio of Pueblo Nuevo, Durango. Farthest to the south, in the municipio of Huajicori, Nayarit, is the comunidad of San Andres de Milpillas Grande. Santa María Ocotán was established as an ejido. Each comunidad is a town that acts as the central political and religious center for several anexos (small settlements) and a multitude of rancherías.

==== Demography ====
A small proportion of the 1.3 million people living in the thinly populated state of Durango are Indians—about 24,000, of whom some 16,000 are Tepehuan. The other Indigenous groups in the area are the Huichol and the Nahuatl-speaking Mexicanero Indians. A small number of Tepehuan live across the border in the states of Nayarit and Zacatecas. As in the case of the Tepehuan of Chihuahua, narrow-sighted suppositions of assimilation and acculturation often led early researchers to write them out of the ethnographic present and wrongly to assume that a viable Tepehuan culture no longer existed in Durango. The region is poorly served by federal and state agencies, and seasonal population movement in search of wage labor is a further impediment to accurate assessment.

==== Linguistic Affiliation ====
The language of the Southern Tepehuan is probably more closely related to the extinct Tepecano language that was spoken in the northern part of the state of Jalisco than to the three other languages (Northern Tepehuan, its dosest living relative; Pima; and Papago of Sonora and southern Arizona) that make up the Tepiman or Piman Branch of the Sonoran Division of the Uto-Aztecan Family. There are at least two mutually intelligible dialects. Southeastern Tepehuan, spoken chiefly in the municipio of El Mezquital, is the most studied and best understood by linguists. Another dialect is in the southwestern municipio of Pueblo Nuevo.

== Religion and mythology ==
Religions among the Northern and Southern Tepehuanes are Tepehuán mythology, Catholic, Animistic and Shamanistic beliefs. Traditions and religion Death and the dead among the three Tepehuán culture have an important meaning at all times. Relatives are damaged by their dead when they fail to religious rules. When someone dies fingers are cut deceased symbolically placing a black thread on the neck and do not see it when deposited in the pit. After a year, and then the next one should "take the soul" dead to stop disturbing the living. In the run of the soul, the assembled relatives heard as the mas'amcalls the dead to eat with relatives an offering food of your choice and then enjoins it go forever. During the Day of the Dead ringing bells remain at the clock: at sunset an offering of tiny food for both children and adults are kept and night passed the church where they remain velándolos. Both Northern (Ódami) and Southern (O'dam and Audam) use the peyote in Tepehuan Mythology, Animistic, and Shamanistic rituals.

=== Tepehuán mythology ===
The Tepehuán's religion is a polytheism. They conceived of the world as inhabited by gods that resided in idols and fetishes of colors or carved stones and bones. These spirits or gods came from underground, the sources of all life and because they provided those things which made life possible for the Tepehuanes, the Tepehuanes in turn were responsible for the sustenance of the gods. The gods were revered not only for their power but also because they were gifts from the Tepehuanes' ancestors. The gods could also provide personal protection and other benefits. Missionaries reported that Tepehuanes carried fetishes with them as talismans against death or other aids in performing certain tasks. Some idols were simply colored stones believed to have magical properties and which could sometimes speak to their owners. Others were carved in shapes of turtles, birds, eagles, lion's heads or human faces. The Jesuits described a principal idol, called Ubumarai, which stood on a hill above a Tepehuan town call Ubúmariano, renamed Santa Catalina de Tepehuanes by the Jesuits. It was five palmos (seventeen feet) tall and consisted of a human head resting on a stone pillar or column. The Tepehuanes made it offerings of arrows, clay pots, animal bones, fruits, and flowers. This practice hints at a two-tier pantheon, one consisting of community details (similar to the broad horizon of belief and practice as proposed by Nancy Farriss for the pre-Conquest Maya) and a second consisting of an array of personal gods in the form of charms and fetishes that could provide an individual with aid and protection. Nicolás de Arnaya identified seven gods revered by the Tepehuanes, all which show possible association with Mesoamerican deities:

- the Creator and Protector of the Tepehuan Nation (Ubumári)
- a god of wind (Ehecatl)
- a fire god (Xiuhtecutli) also called the "old god," one of the most ancient in the Medanerican pantheon
- a god of rain or water and a god of hail (Tlaloc and associated gods)
- a god of kilowatt (Centeotl, god of maize and agriculture)
- "gods requiring blood nourishment of the sun" (Tonatiuh and, later Huitzilopochtli).

=== Animism ===
The Ódami are animistic, unlike the Southern Tepehuán which are mostly Catholic. Animism is one of the original religion of the Tepehuans following with Shamanism and Mythology of the Tepehuan. The Ódami ask the spirits for good harvest and protection if the whole Ódami Nation. The Ódami and Rarámuri both share common rituals of singing and dancing to please the spirits. The most popular spirits are alongside such figures as the Deer God, Mountain spirits, the Morning Star, and a culture hero resembling Quetzalcóatl of Aztec myth.

=== Shamanism ===
Among the Ódami and O’dam people (better known as Northern Tepehuan and Southern Tepehuan by outsiders) the initiation process includes novices learning two main skills: how to make and use their ritual paraphernalia and how to "dream well". The former consists mainly in a set of different kind of arrows which represents deities, ancestors, and the shamans themselves in ritual contexts, constituting powerful magical instruments. The latter refers to the capacity to intervene consciously and intentionally in the dream realm, since shamanic oneiric experiences have lasting effects in woken life. Since therapeutic processes applied by O’dam mankagim are solved in the dream realm, they constitute one of the most important arenas of action in shamanic healing.

=== Catholicism ===
Catholics are served by a resident priest at San Bernardino, who also serves the surrounding areas. Other communities are served by visiting missionaries who arrive before Easter Sunday and stay several weeks. The archbishop comes yearly from Durango to baptize and confirm children. No other priests or members of Protestant religions missionize or visit the region.

== Language ==
The Tepehuán languages, which include the Northern Tepehuan, Southeastern Tepehuan, and Southwestern Tepehuan languages, are part of the Uto-Aztecan language family and are related to the Pima Bajo and Tohono O'odham. Northern Ódami (autonym: Ódami) features the core expression: ''Dɨame ’xir na tɛhɨ wa áira tama'' ("Word-heart with moon-soul united"), reflecting linguistic cosmology.<ref>{{cite web|url=https://catalogo.inali.gob.mx/catalogo_lenguas.php?cdlc=1|title="Catálogo de las lenguas indígenas nacionales: Tepehuano del norte"|publisher=Instituto Nacional de Lenguas Indígenas|access-date=2025-12-28}}</ref>

== Notable Tepehuán ==
- Cristina Vee - Voice actress and director

== See also ==
- Other Native Mexicans
- Aridoamerica
- Tepehuán Revolt
