= Santa Catarina de Tepehuanes =

Locality in the Mexican state of Durango

Coordinates: 25.3396°N 105.7245°W

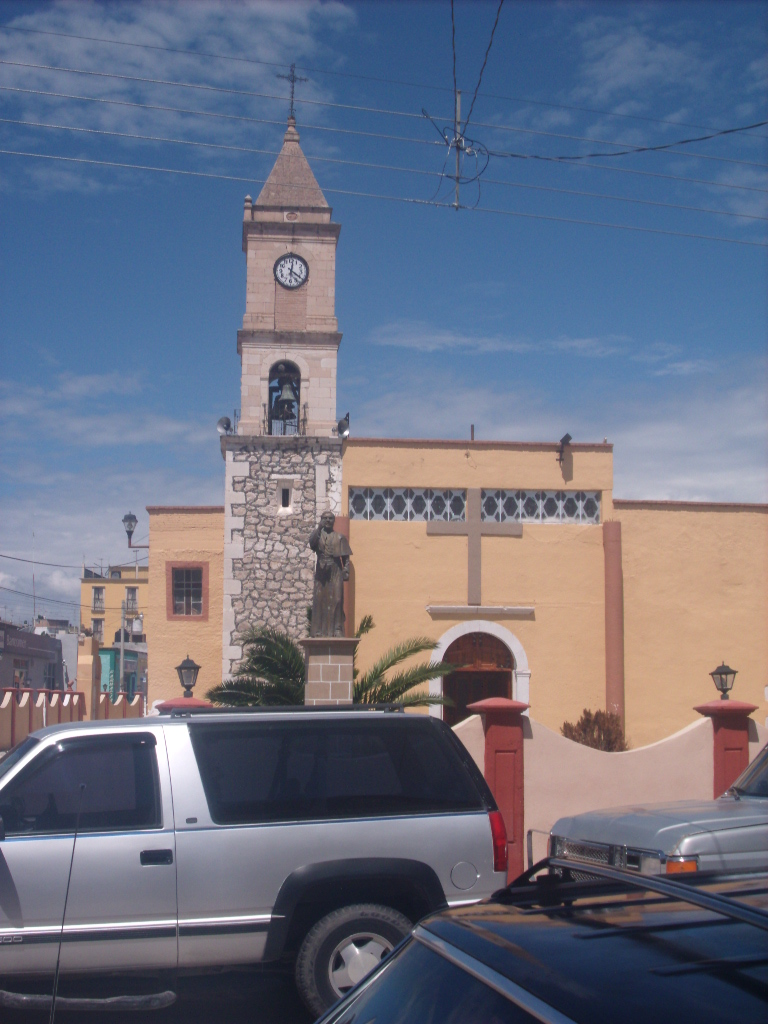
Church of Santa Catarina in Santa Catarina de Tepehuanes, Durango, Mexico.

Santa Catarina de Tepehuanes is a locality of Tepehuanes Municipality in Durango, Mexico.

It is the municipal seat of the municipality.
