= Andrés Pérez de Ribas =

Spanish Jesuit missionary and historian

- Born: 1576; Córdoba, Kingdom of Córdoba, Crown of Castile, Spanish Empire
- Died: March 26, 1655 (aged 78–79); Mexico City, Viceroyalty of New Spain, Spanish Empire
- Occupations: Writer, historian, missionary
- Movement: Jesuits

Andrés Pérez De Ribas (born at Cordova, Spain, 1576; died in Mexico, 26 March 1655) was a Spanish Jesuit missionary, and historian of north-western Mexico.

== Life ==
He joined the Society of Jesus in 1602, coming at once to America, and finishing his novitiate in Mexico in 1604. In the same year he was sent to undertake the Christianization of the Ahome and Suaqui of northern Sinaloa, of whom the former were friendly and anxious for teachers, while the latter had just been brought to submission after a hard campaign. Within a year he had both tribes gathered into towns, each with a church, while all of the Ahome and a large part of the Suaqui had been baptized. The two tribes together numbered about 10,000.

In 1613, being then superior of the Sinaloa district, he was instrumental in procuring the submission of a hostile mountain tribe. In 1617, in company with other Jesuit missionaries whom he had brought from Mexico City, he began the conversion of the powerful and largely hostile Yaqui tribe of Sonora, whose population was estimated at 30,000. Within a few years, most of them had been gathered into eight mission towns.

In 1620 Ribas was recalled to Mexico to assist in the college. He was ultimately appointed provincial, which post he held for several years. After a visit to Rome in 1643 to take part in the election of a general of the order, he devoted himself chiefly to study and writing until his death.

== Works ==
He left numerous works, religious and historical, most of which are still in manuscript, but his reputation as an historian rests upon his history of the Jesuit missions of Mexico published at Madrid in 1645, one year after its completion, under the title: Historia de los Triunfos de Nuestra Santa Fe entre gentes las más bárbaras ... conseguidos por los soldados de la milicia de Ia Compañía de Jesús en las misiones de la Provincia de Nueva-España. Of this work, Hubert Howe Bancroft says:

"It is a complete history of Jesuit work in Nueva Vizcaya, practically the only history the country had from 1590 to 1644, written not only by a contemporary author but by a prominent actor in the events narrated, who had access to all the voluminous correspondence of his order, comparatively few of which documents have been preserved. In short, Ribas wrote under the most favourable circumstances and made good use of his opportunities."
