= Canatlán =

Canatlán may refer to either a city or its surrounding municipality in the Mexican state of Durango:

- Ciudad Canatlán
- Canatlán Municipality
