= Flag of Durango =

Flag of state of Durango, Mexico

- Use: Civil and state flag
- Proportion: 4:7
- Adopted: March 9, 2014
- Design: Solid white with the Durango coat of arms in the center.

The Flag of Durango is the flag used by the Mexican state of Durango. The flag was adopted on March 9, 2014. The State Flag consists of a white rectangular banner with a ratio of four to seven between the width and length; in the center it bears the State coat of arms, placed in such a way that it occupies three-quarters of the width.

The symbol is used by all successive regimes in different forms.

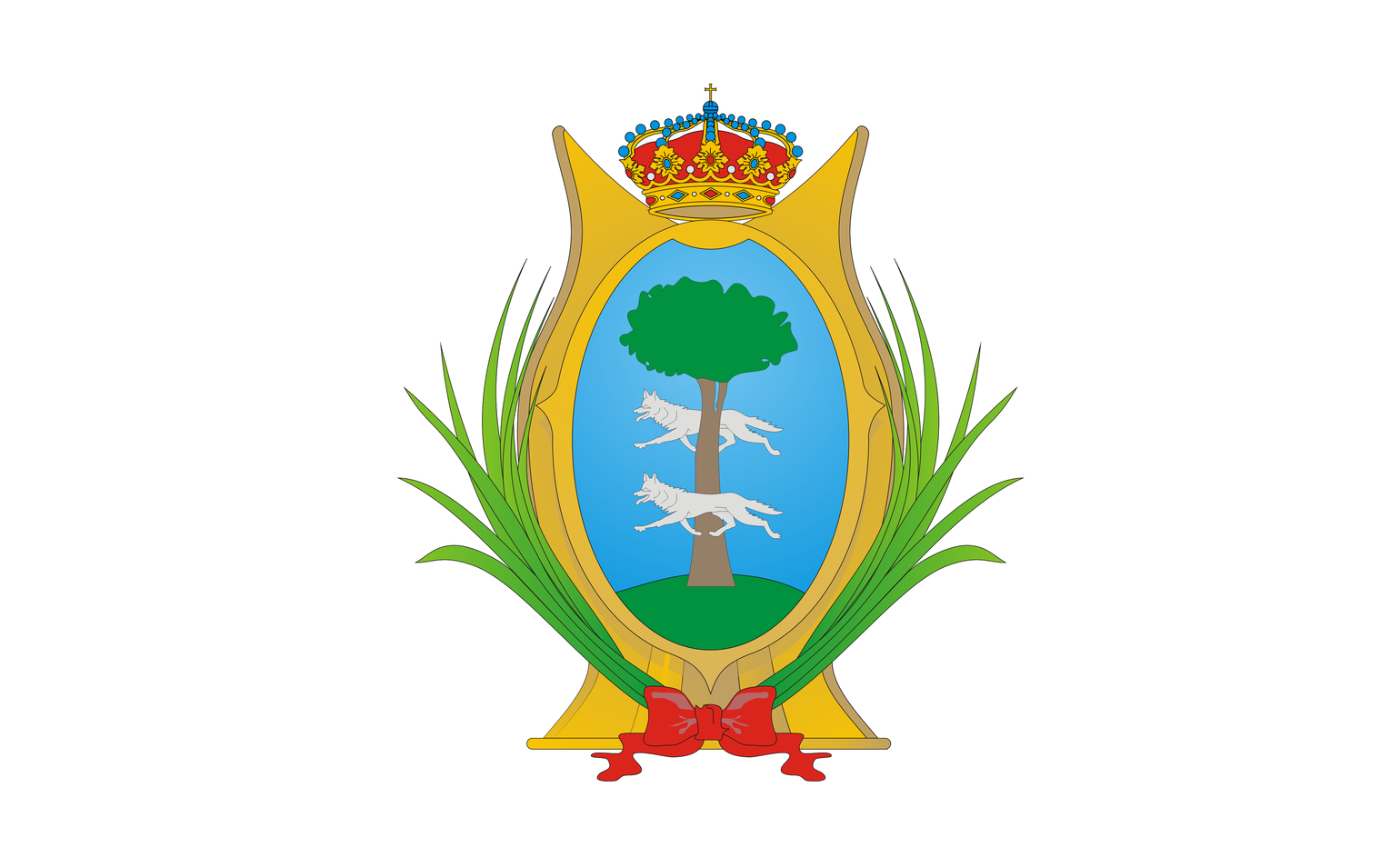
Coat of arms from 1998.

== See also ==
- Flag of Mexico
- Coat of arms of Durango
