= Trinidad Núñez Quiñones =

Mexican artist

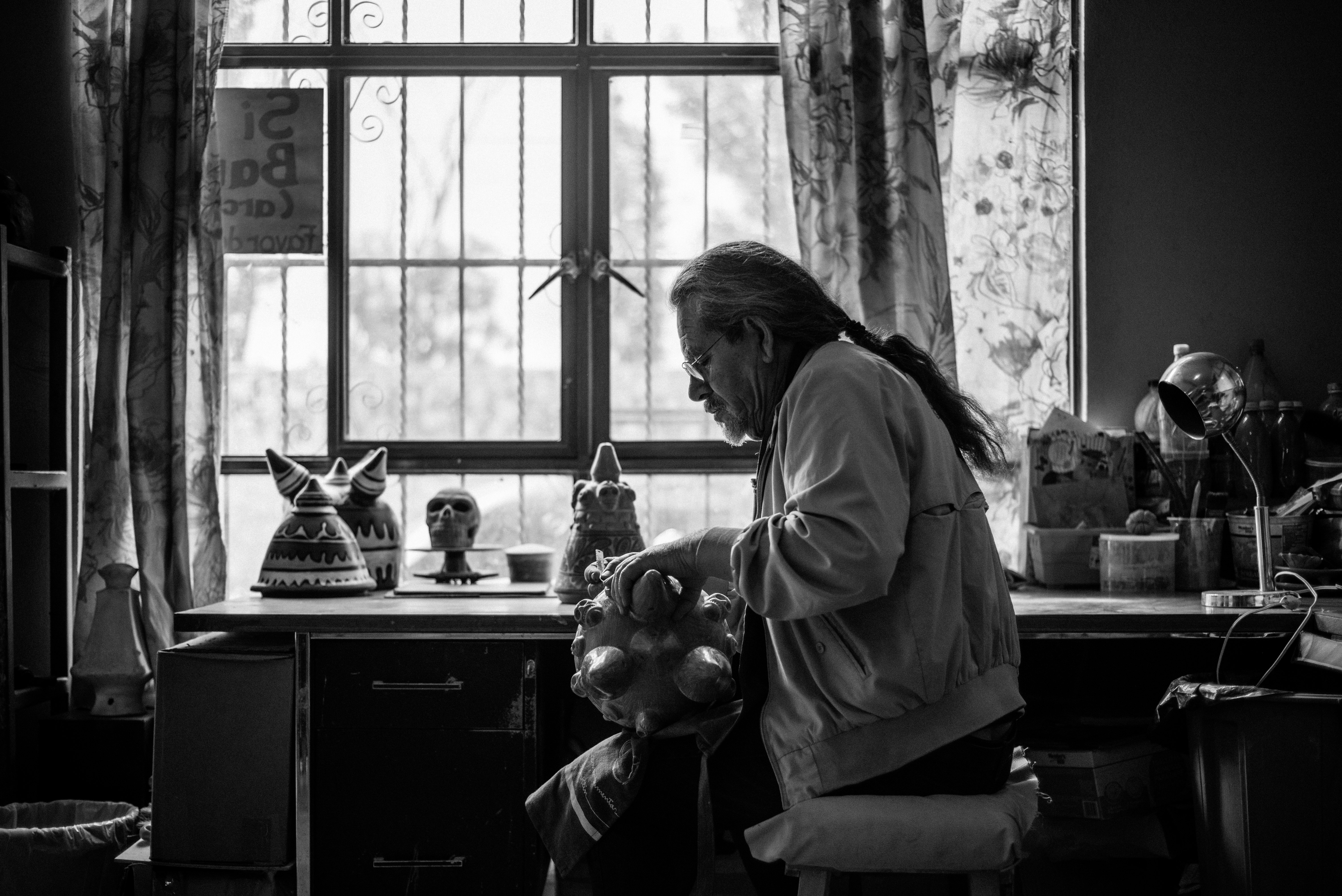
- Núñez in his workshop in Victoria de Durango, Mexico
- Born: June 13, 1948 (age 77); San José de Gracia, Canatlán, Durango

Trinidad Núñez Quiñones (born June 13, 1948), otherwise known simply as Trino, is an artisan, artist, researcher and teacher whose work has been recognized with numerous awards in both the city and state of Durango. He was trained as a visual artist but has since specialized in pottery and ceramic sculptures. As a teacher, he has worked as a professor at the state university, trained local indigenous people and established the ceramic workshop which bears his name at Durango city's main cultural center.

== Life ==
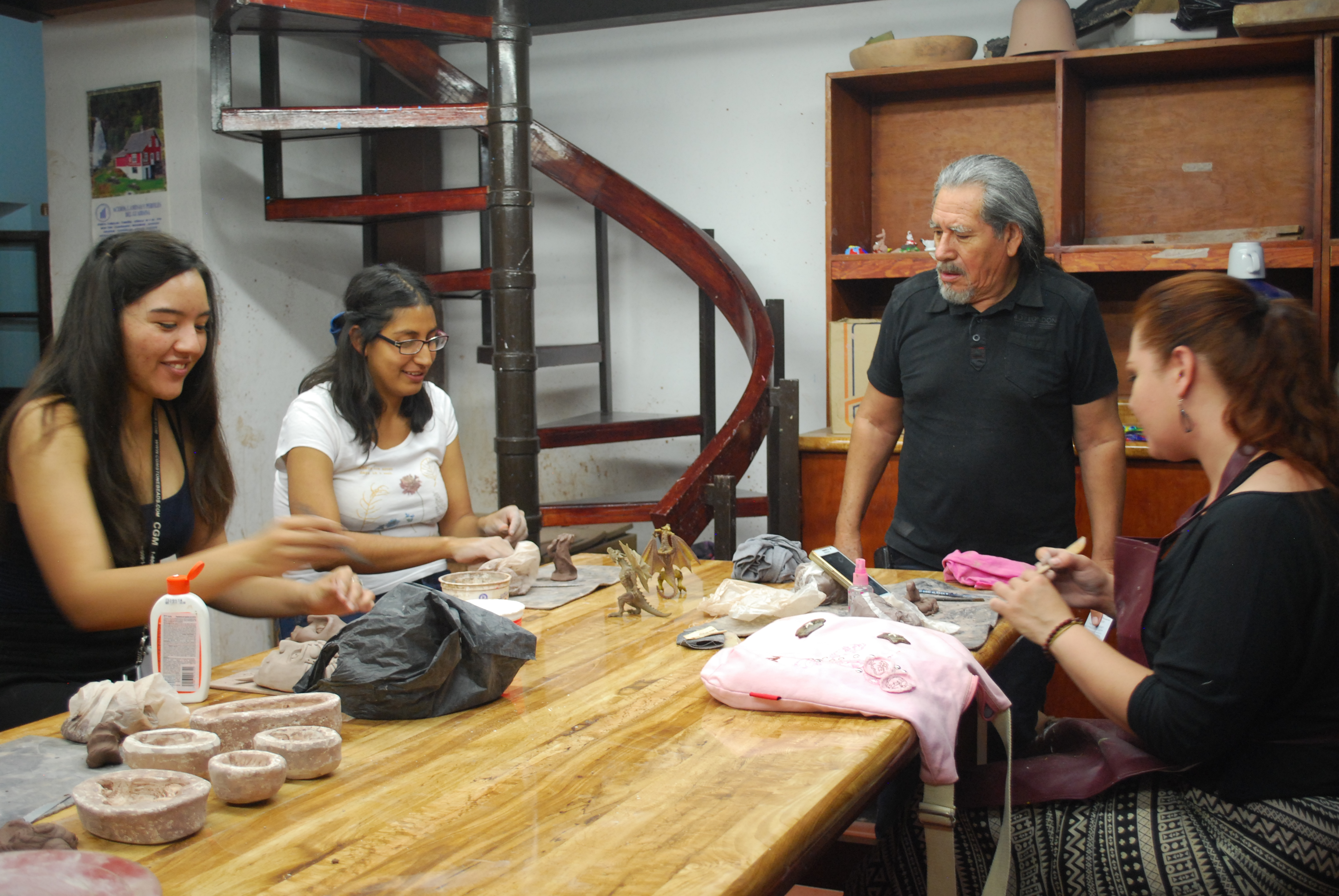
Núñez with students in the workshop that bears his name

Núñez was born in the small rural community of San José de Gracia in the municipality of Canatlán, Durango, to a family with Spanish and Tarahumara heritage. His father, Andrés Núñez Gallegos, was a farmer and political leader in the small town. His mother was Petra Soria Quiñones, who was a traditional housewife, taking care of the family and selling food to field hands on their way to work. Núñez was the youngest of six children, all of whom worked the family's fields and with their livestock.

However, Núñez lived in his family's country home only until he was about five years old. In 1953, another local farmer, one of the richest in the town, came to the family's house enraged at Núñez's father over a matter with horses. A violent confrontation began. To defend her husband, Núñez's mother took a rifle and shot the attacker dead. The revenge of the man's family included burning down the home and forcing the family to flee: the father to the mountains and the rest of the family to the outskirts of Durango city to start over.

The transition from rural to urban life was difficult for the family. Núñez describes himself as a child as a troublemaker but also extremely curious. The family got by selling a number of things including newspapers. Núñez attended the local public schools. In fourth grade, he was taught how to make small animals by his teacher using clay from a local ravine. It was this experience that taught him that to create was his vocation. He began by molding fish and turtles, figures that can still be seen in much of his work today.

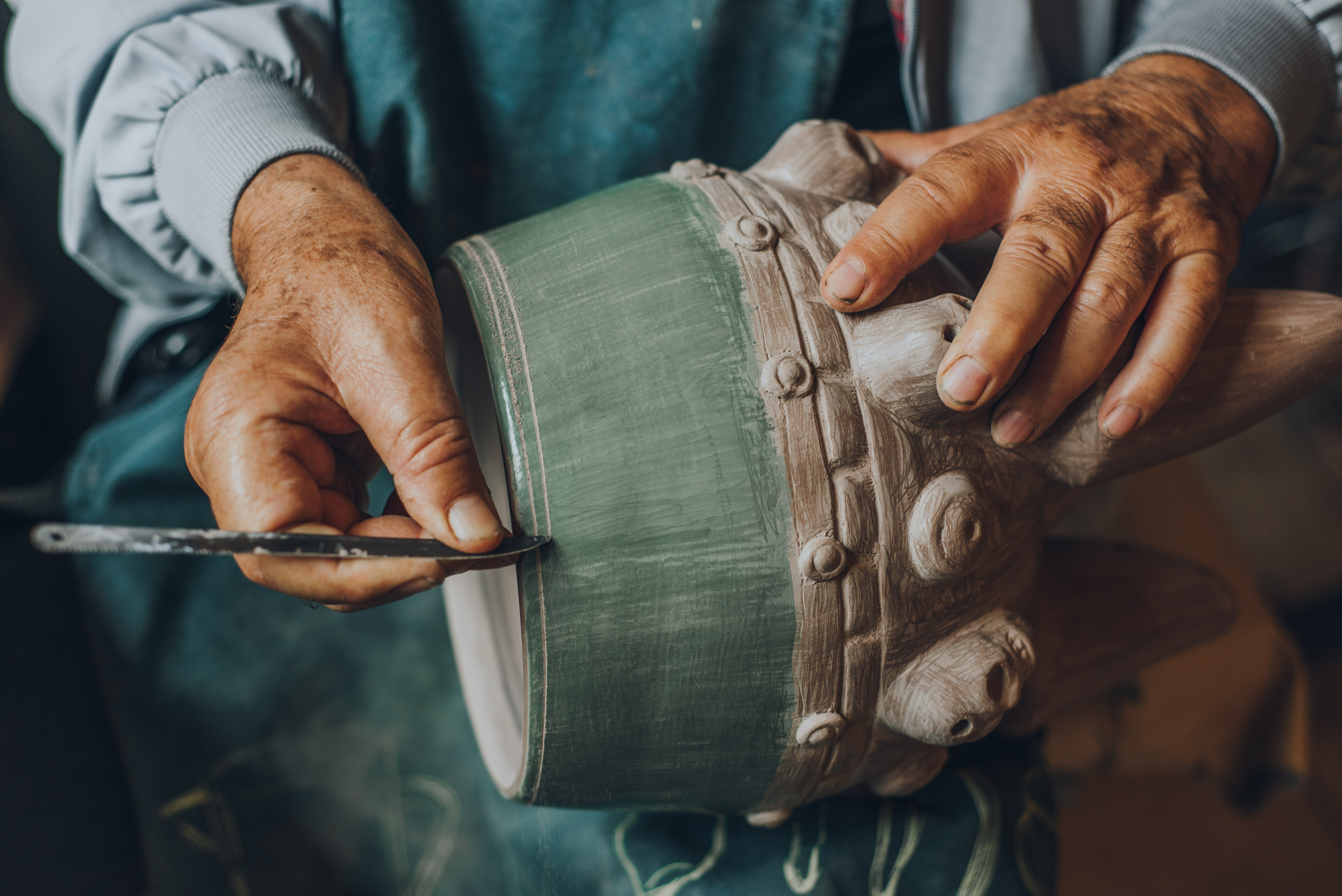
Trino Núñez applying sgaffito to a piece

In 1973, he married Mireya Rodríguez Vega when he was 24 at a time when large scale marriage ceremonies were sponsored by the state. The marriage lasted twenty years, producing four children: Gerardo, Xochiquetzali, Utzmaya and Iztaccíhuatl. Later the couple adopted a fifth child, Iris Grisel. However, his wife did not completely support his artistic endeavors, which he considered to be the most important thing in his life. However, he does admit that he did have problems with alcohol during his marriage.

Some years later, he married his current wife, is Norma Elizabeth Campos Galindo. This marriage produced two more children, Itzel and Metzi, as well as Núñez becoming stepfather to Luis Arturo and Alejandro Cortez Campos.

== Career ==
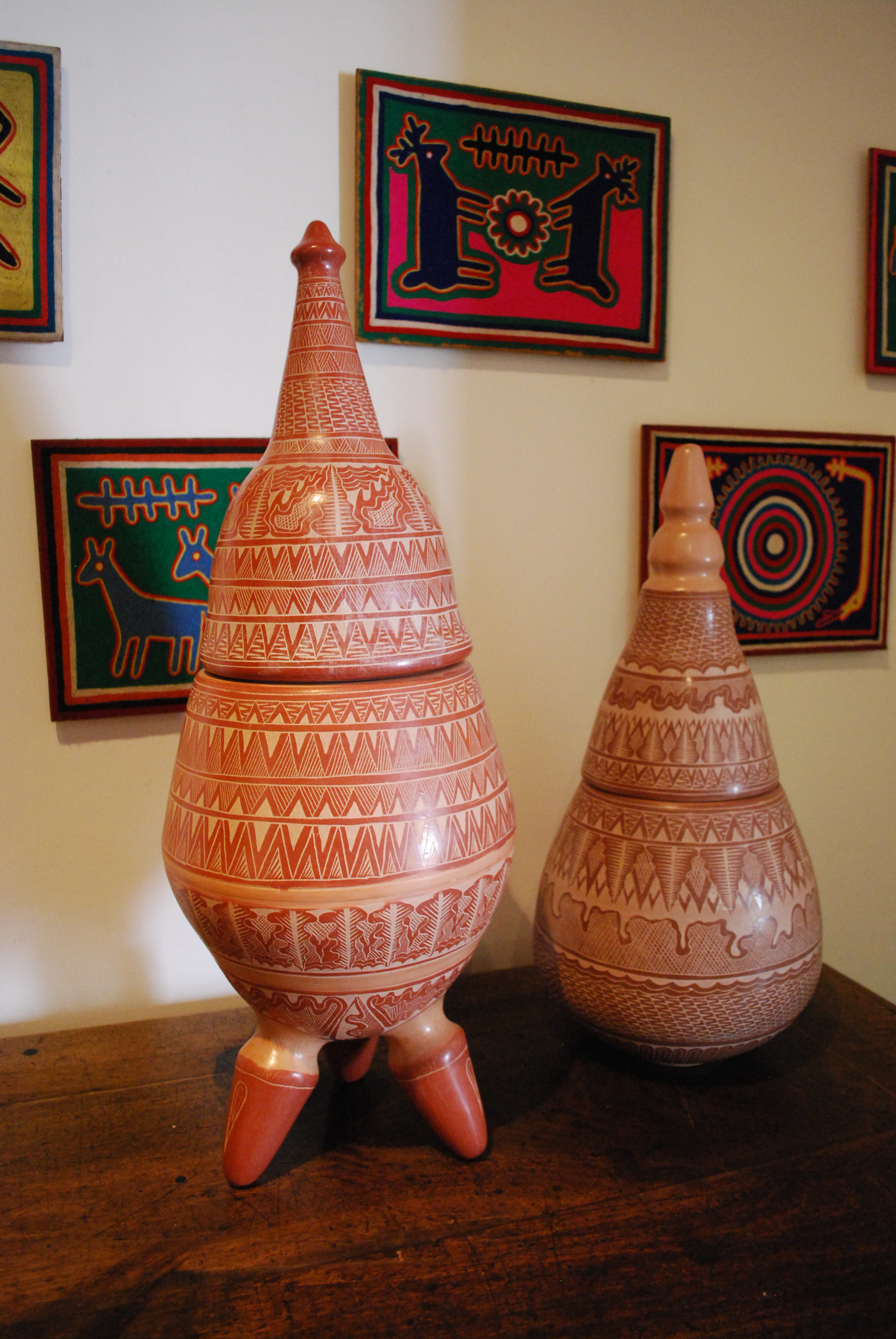
Two of Núñez's works at the Museo de las Culturas Populares in Victoria de Durango

Despite a four-year stint in the army that interrupted his professional education, Núñez says he never doubted that he wanted to be an artist of some kind. He began his formal artistic education at the Centro Universitario de Arte, Arquitectura y Diseño at the University of Guadalajara. Sometime later he would finish that degree in visual art from the recently established School of Painting, Sculpture and Handcrafts of the Juarez University of the State of Durango.

His early years as an artist and artisan had elements of experimentation. He once did a series of turtle figures with the faces of politicians. However, his artistic expression has since focused almost entirely on the preservation of Mexican and Durango traditions.

Núñez's career as an artist has spanned over forty years. Although partially retired, he is still active, both as an artist and as a teacher. As an artist, he works with his wife and son, Gerardo Núñez Rodríguez.

Núñez's most widespread impact has been as a teacher and researcher. He has taught students of just about all ages, from classes in adobe homes to those in university. He estimates that he has taught over 8,000 students over his career, many of which have gone on to promote Durango culture both inside and outside the state. He began his teaching career in 1968 while still a student at the School of Painting, Sculpture and Handcrafts in the 1970s, with which he also worked researching the state's clay deposits. Early in his career, he was a cofounder of a group called the Black Spider Circle, professors and artists who supported the first graduates of the School of Painting, Sculpture and Handcrafts. He was one of the founders of the Workers and Employees Union of the Juarez University of the State of Durango, which was the model for similar organizations for professors. From 1992 to 2012, he was a full professor at the School of Painting, Sculpture and Handcrafts, retiring from the school after 38 years.

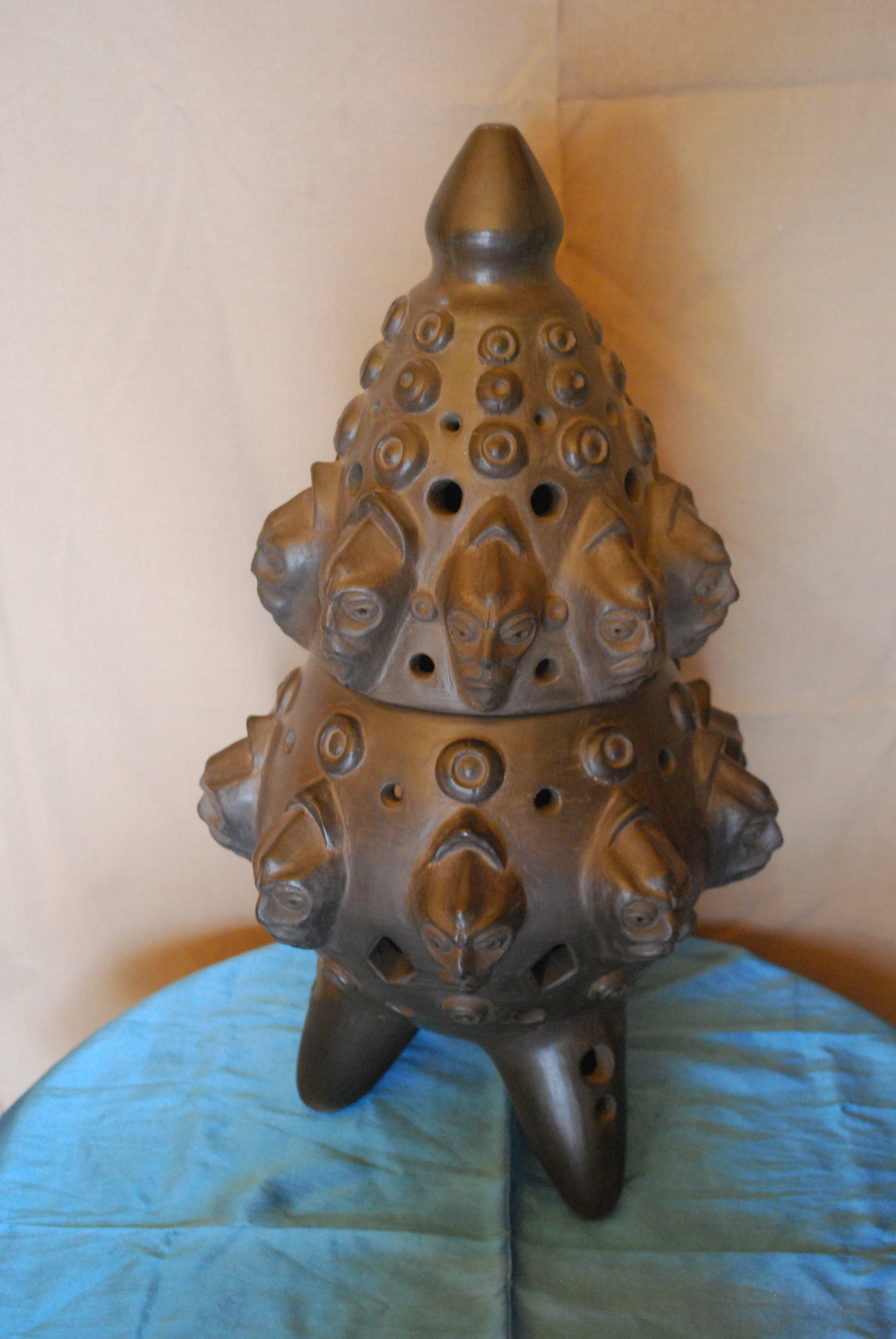
Brazier in blackened pottery by Núñez

In 2001, he also became involved with a federally-funded project to teach extremely poor Tepehuan communities in the municipality of Mezquital pottery and ceramic techniques. . First he investigated the clays in the area, and found types suitable for high-fire utilitarian items such as bathroom fixtures and tile, as well as those suitable for low-fire domestic and decorative items. The goal was to help the residents of the area be self-sufficient in their communities, without having to migrate to Durango city or other areas to work. The decision was made to found mini-workshops attached to family homes. The success of this project is one of the artist's main sources of pride.

Núñez has established three major ceramics workshops, his own called Taller Toltecatl, a workshop in Nuevo Ideal, Durango and the workshop in Durango city's main cultural center (Casa de Cultura), which now bears his name. This last one he founded in 1980, and has served as its main instructor since then. The classes he gives here are one of the center's main attractions, teaching not only ceramics, but also cartonería and alebrije making. He was offered the chance to introduce a new handcraft to the Casa de Cultura, including wood sculpture, but chose made cartonería alebrijes because of it is economical, making it accessible to more people. He also finds it limitless in terms of imagination. Most start out with one idea but then finish with something different as the alebrije develops.

== Exhibitions and recognition ==
Núñez began formally exhibiting his work when he was about twenty five years old. Since then, he has exhibited locally, nationally and internationally. From 1964 to 1982 he exhibited regularly at the Los Tlacuilos gallery in School of Painting, Sculpture and Handcrafts, and still has shows there on occasion. The vast majority of his exhibitions have been in the state of Durango, including fine art venues such as the Guillermo Ceniceros Modern Art Museum. In 1995, he exhibited at the Academy of San Carlos in Mexico City and in 2000 at the National Museum of Ceramic Handcrafts in Tlaquepaque, Jalisco. He has also judged numerous handcraft competitions in the state.

He is a quiet man, preferring that his work speak for him. He has Numerous other awards from municipal and state entities. His awards include first place at the XII State Handcraft Fair in 2010 in the ceramics category and the Benito Juarez Merit medal from the Juarez State University. The ceramics workshop in the Casa de Culutra was named after him in 2013. His work has been catalogued in a book called Sentimiento Barro-co which has been distributed throughout Mexico. His biography was published in 2017, published by the Consejo Editorial Municipal of the city of Durango titled Arcilla, cartones y vida, apuntes para una semblanza de Trino. written by Enrique Fernando Núñez Martínez.
