= Juan Bautista Vargas Arreola =

Juan Bautista Vargas
- Born: June 24, 1890 Ocotán, Durango
- Died: December 13, 1947 (aged 57) Mexico City, Mexico
- Allegiance: Mexico (antireeleccionista revolutionary forces)
- Rank: General
- Commands: 17th Military Zone

Juan Bautista Vargas Arreola (June 24, 1890 – December 13, 1947) was a celebrated Mexican brigadier general who fought alongside Francisco Villa in the Mexican Revolution. He was a member of Villa's elite cavalry troops and bodyguards known as Los Dorados (The Golden Ones). At the time of his death he was Commander of the 17th Military Zone based in Querétaro. At the request of then president Miguel Alemán Valdés, he was considering running for the governor's seat in his home state of Durango. A street in Monterrey, Nuevo León is named in his honor.

== Birth and parentage ==
Vargas was born in Ocotán, Durango on June 24, 1890, the son of Tomás Vargas and Manuela Arreola de Vargas. In his infancy, his parents moved the family to Canatlán, Durango. As a teenager he traveled to Victoria de Durango, the state capital, to continue his studies. Revolution was in the air.

== The revolt against Díaz ==
In early 1910, Vargas became involved with revolutionary figures Cástulo Herrera and Guillermo Baca in the state of Chihuahua. On November 20, 1910, he raised arms against the government of Porfirio Díaz on orders from Francisco I. Madero and Abraham González, who at the time was governor of Chihuahua. He organized a guerrilla group of 50 men and built up support for the revolution.

Vargas' memoirs of the revolutionary period (A sangre y fuego con Pancho Villa "Blood and Fire [My Life] with Pancho Villa") were printed in a Mexico City magazine between 1938 and 1939. The memoirs are self-serving but provide rare insight onto the revolution and personal details on many revolutionary figures, which are otherwise scarce. The memoirs, edited and compile by his daughter Bertha, were published as a book in Mexico in 1988.
