= Durango =

State of Mexico

Durango Korian (Tepehuán)
- State
- Free and Sovereign State of Durango; Estado Libre y Soberano de Durango (Spanish); Korian (Tepehuán)
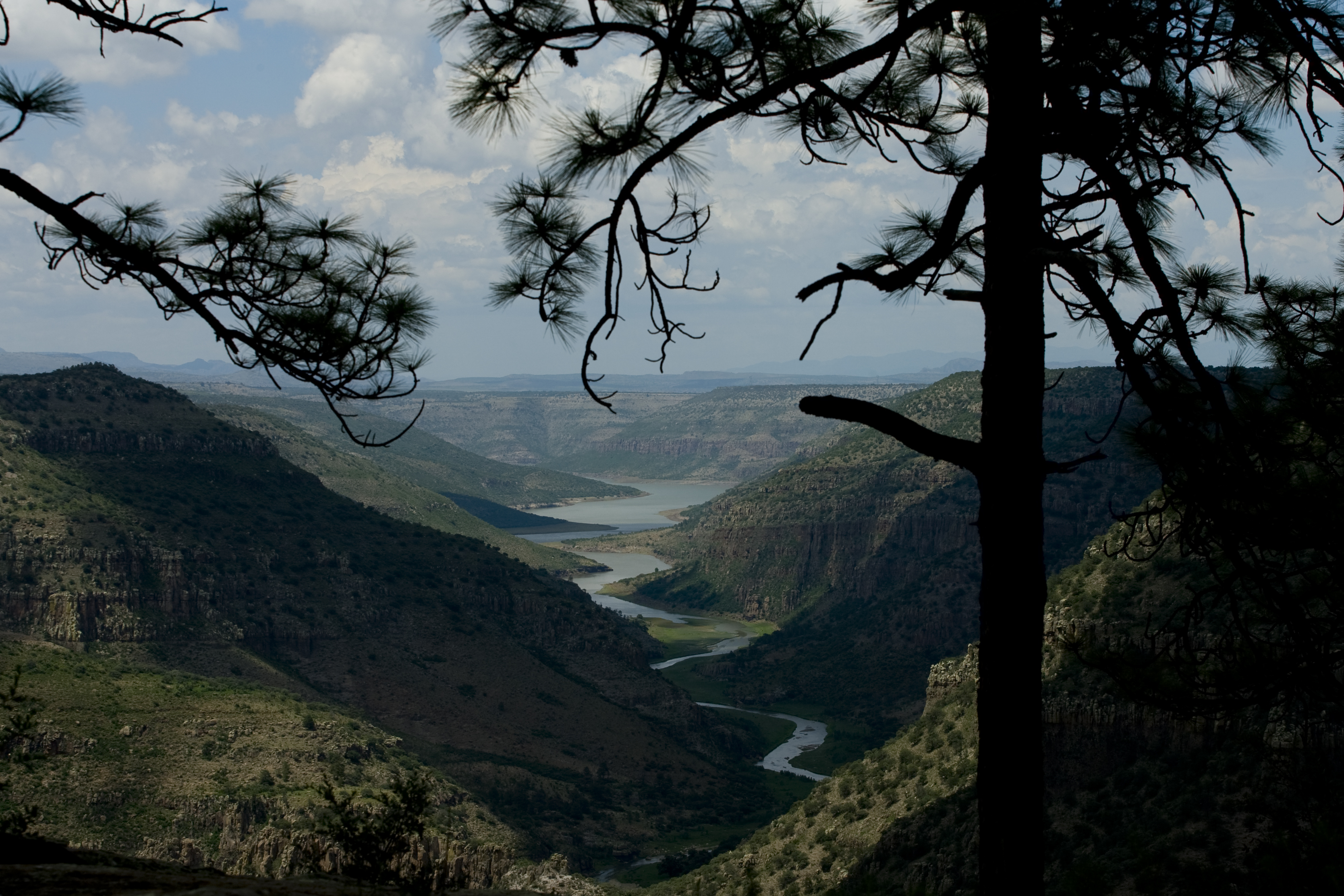
- The Río Mezquital

- Flag Coat of arms

- State of Durango within Mexico
- Coordinates: 24°56′N 104°55′W
- Country: Mexico
- Capital and largest city: Victoria de Durango
- Municipalities: 39
- Admission: May 22, 1824
- Order: 17th

Government
  - Governor: Esteban Villegas Villarreal (PRI)
  - Senators: Miguel Ángel Lucero Olivas (PT); Lilia Margarita Valdez Martínez (Morena); José Ramón Enríquez Herrera (Morena)
  - Deputies: Federal deputies: • Francisco Castrellón Garza (1st); • Omar Castañeda González (2nd); • Martha Alicia Arreola Martínez (3rd); • Gina Campuzano González (4th)

Area
  - Total: 123,317 km^{2} (47,613 sq mi)
- Ranked 4th
- Highest elevation (Cerro Gordo): 3,355 m (11,007 ft)

Population (2020)
  - Total: 1,832,650
  - Rank: 24th
  - Density: 14.8613/km^{2} (38.4906/sq mi)
  - Rank: 30th
- Demonym: Duranguense

GDP
  - Total: MXN 342 billion (US$17.0 billion) (2022)
  - Per capita: US$9,024 (2022)
- Time zone: UTC−06:00 (Zona Centro)
- Postal code: 34-35
- Area code: Area codes 1 and 2: • 618; • 629; • 649; • 671; • 674; • 675; • 676; • 677; • 871; • 872
- ISO 3166 code: MX-DUR
- HDI: ▲0.781 high Ranked 23rd of 32
- Website: Official website

Durango, (Note: Spanish pronunciation: [duˈɾaŋɡo]) officially the Free and Sovereign State of Durango, (Note: Spanish: Estado Libre y Soberano de Durango; Tepehuán: Korian; Nahuatl: Tepēhuahcān) is one of the states which make up the 32 federal entities of Mexico, situated in the northwest portion of the country. With a population of 1,832,650, the eighth lowest of Mexico's states, Durango has Mexico's second-lowest population density, after Baja California Sur. The capital city, Victoria de Durango, is named after the first President of Mexico, Guadalupe Victoria.

== Geography ==
=== General information ===
The area of Durango is 123,451.2 km^{2} or 12.3 million ha; this accounts for about 6.3% of the entire territory of Mexico. It is the fourth largest state, lying at the extreme northwest of the Central Mexican Plateau, where it meets the Sierra Madre Occidental—the highest peaks in the state. The state has an average elevation of 1,775 meters above sea level, with a mean elevation of 1,750 m in the Valleys region and 2,450 m in the Sierra region. The city of Durango is on the foothills of the Sierra Madre Occidental, with an elevation of 1,857 m.

Durango is landlocked, bordered by Chihuahua, Coahuila, Zacatecas, Nayarit and Sinaloa. It is divided into 39 municipalities, based on the 1917 Constitution of Mexico, and several additional divisions have been made since.

The Sierra Madre Occidental blocks moisture from the Pacific Ocean, impacting the local climate of the state. Las Quebradas region, located over the mountain chain and on the northwest of the state, has a humid subtropical climate. Excepting the highest elevations, the rest of the state has semi-arid and temperate climates. It is hot and dry in the East, with some temperate areas existing at higher elevations.

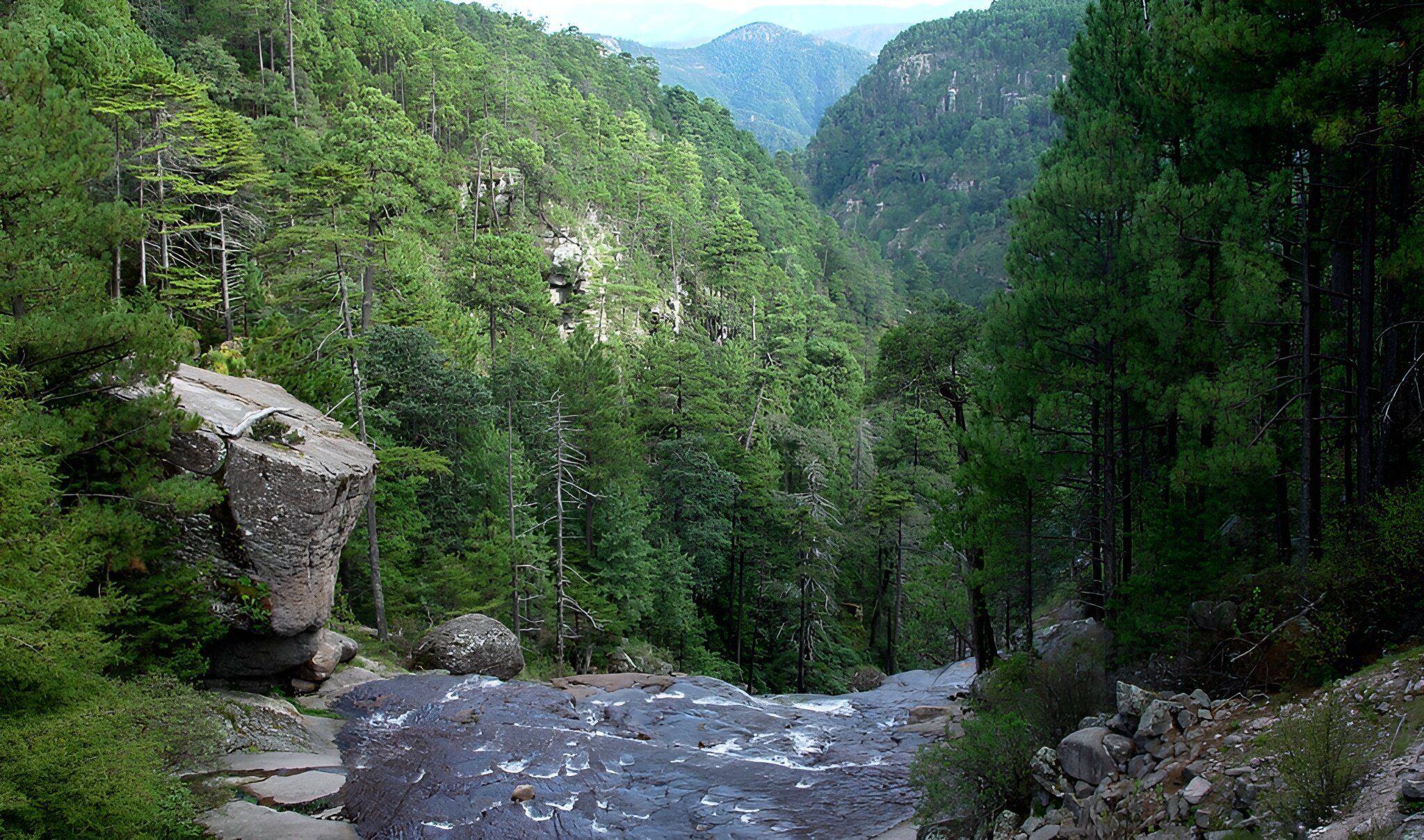
View toward the canyon at the Mexiquillo nature reserve

Most of the state is mountainous and heavily forested, with the Sierra Madre Occidental covering around two-thirds of the state. Like much of northern Mexico, the state has worked to reforest the degraded forests of the Sierra Madre Occidental and Sierra Madre Oriental. Reforesting efforts have focused on replanting native tree species, versus those used for wood production. However, the tree density in many areas is still too low, especially on the eastern slopes of the Sierra Madre Occidental where tree poaching and clearing for agricultural activities is problematic.

Many rivers begin in Durango, but lead into other Mexican states. Some of these rivers empty into the Pacific, or into the lake area of La Comarca, while one, the Florida, flows into the Gulf of Mexico.

=== Ecological regions ===
Ecologically, the state is divided into four regions: La Quebrada, the Sierra, the Valleys and the Semi-desert.

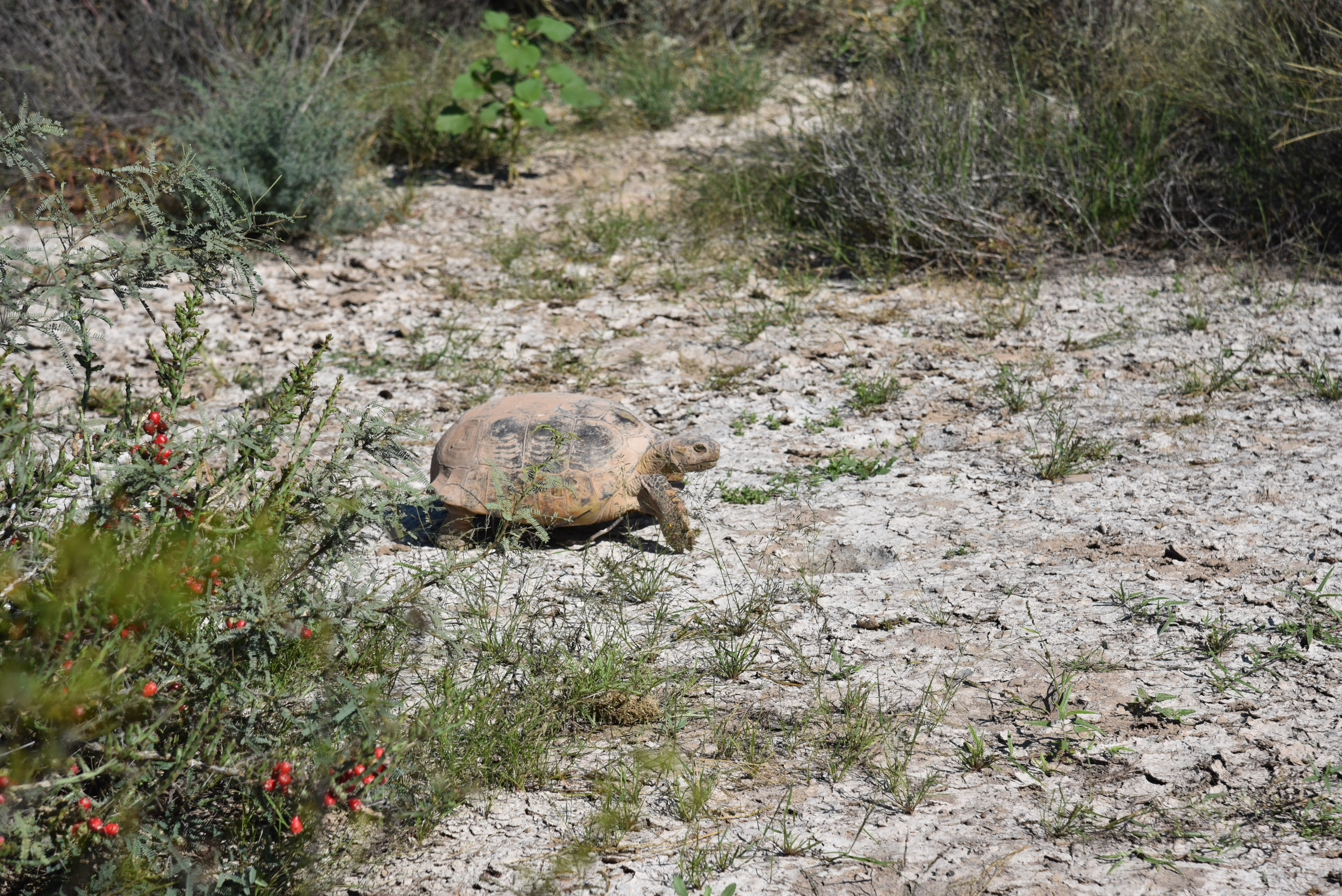
Desert tortoise in the Mapimí Biosphere Reserve

The Semi-desert (sometimes called the Bolsón de Mapimí) is located in the northeast of the state and includes the municipalities of Hidalgo, Mapimí (including the Silent Zone, Tlahualilo, San Pedro del Gallo, San Luis del Cordero, Nazas, Lerdo, Gómez Palacio, Cuencamé, Santa Clara, General Simón Bolívar and San Juan de Guadalupe. Most of the terrain here is flat and its climate is dry. Temperatures are cold in the winter and hot in the summer. These municipalities are classified as either part of the Chihuahua Desert or in the transition zone. The area is relatively flat with some mountain ranges and a slight incline towards the interior of the country. The area was at one time under the sea, but today the vegetation consists of scrub, nopal cactus, maguey plants, barrel cactus and other arid zone plants. It is defined by two rivers: the Nazas and the Aguanaval. The region has two reservoirs: the Lázaro Cárdenas (Palmito) and the Francisco Zarco (Tórtolas), located between the Cuencamé and Lerdo municipalities. Animals that can be found here include coyotes, gavilanes (sparrowhawks), various snakes, owls, chameleons, tarantulas and scorpions. Most of the economically important natural resources come from mining, including deposits of gold, silver, iron and mercury. There are also large deposits of marble.

The La Laguna is short for La Comarca de la Laguna (the region of the lake) or Comarca Lagunera (region of lakes), an arid and semi-arid region that covers a significant portion of northeastern Durango and southeastern Coahuila. The area was created by sediments from torrential river flows deposited over large valleys. These river flows also created lagoons which served to recharge underground aquifers or remain as intermittent surface waters. Originally, the rivers supported habitat for native grasses, rush and ditch reed which provided habitat for various water birds and fish.

The area is home to Durango's only caverns. The Rosario Caves (grutas) are located near Ciudad Lerdo, as well as the Mapimí Biosphere, noted for various plants and the desert tortoise. It is a highly protected area centering on where the states of Chihuahua, Coahuila and Durango meet.

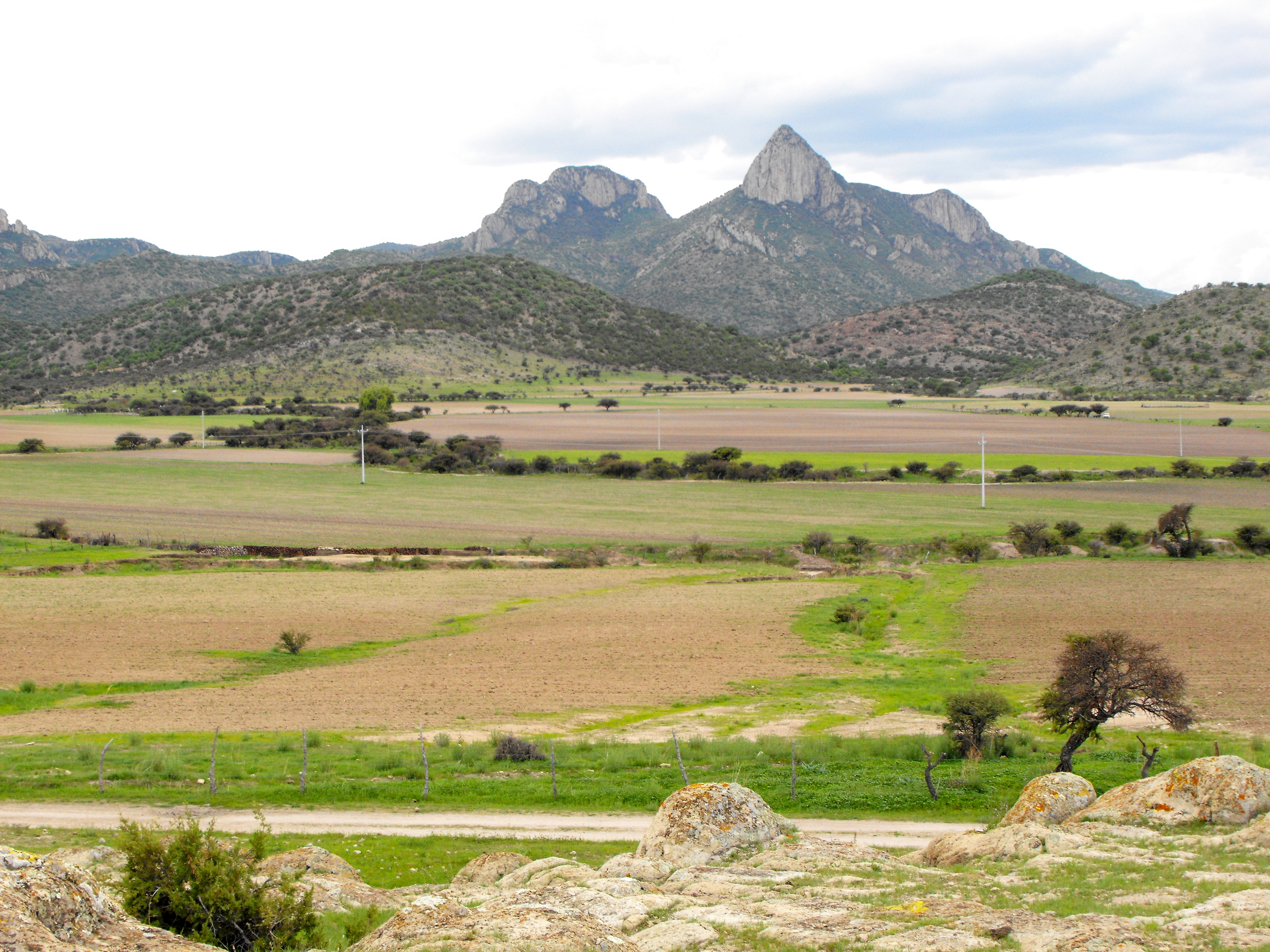
El Picacho in the Valleys region of the state

The Valleys are located in the center of the state and include the municipalities of Nombre de Dios, Durango, Nuevo Ideal, Canatlán, Guadalupe Victoria, Pánuco de Coronado, Poanas, Súchil, Vicente Guerrero, Ocampo, San Bernardo, Indé, Coneto de Comonfort, El Oro, Rodeo, San Juan del Río and Peñón Blanco. The region consists principally of river valleys and plains located among small mountain ranges. The main peaks in this area include the San Jacinto in the Silla Mountains and Peñon Blanco, which many schoolchildren in the area take trips to. Other major geographical formations in the Valleys Region include cliffs called Las Catedrales, along with those called Malpaís and La Breña, which were formed by lava flows over 250,000 hectares. The area is also home to the Cerro de Mercado which is important for its large deposit of iron.

The valleys proper are flat and suitable for farming, with irrigation from the Nazas, Florido and Tunal Rivers. Reservoirs for this purpose include the Santiaguillo, Guatimapé and Refugio Salcido. It has large areas with grass, huizache, sabinos and poplar trees. There is a shallow wetland area called the Guatimapé, or Santiguillo. It provides vital habitat for flocks of migrating birds in winter, especially cranes, geese and ducks. Around this lake, there are Mennonite communities who are noted for their cheeses and cured meats. The region also provides habitat for coyotes, rabbits, squirrels, foxes, geese and ducks. The rivers contain fish such as catfish, bass, carp and tilapia. The area also has hot springs due to tectonic activity. The best known springs are the Zape, Atotonilco and the Hervideros. The area is home to the state capital of Durango and many former haciendas that attest to the area's agricultural history.

The Sierra region is in the west of the state. It includes the municipalities of Guanaceví, Tepehuanes, and parts of Santiago Papasquiaro, Topia, Canelas, Otáez, Tamazula, San Dimas, Pueblo Nuevo, Mezquital, Durango, Ocampo and San Bernardo. The terrain is rugged with freezing temperatures in the winter and snow in the higher elevations. There is also a rainy season in the summer. The vegetation in the Sierra region is mostly pine–oak forest, consisting of pines, oak, cedar, and strawberry trees as well as grasslands. The fauna includes deer, pumas, coyotes, foxes, badgers and wild turkeys. Fish such as bass and catfish are found in the rivers, along with various species of birds and reptiles. Most of the state's rivers originate in the mountains of this region.

Las Quebradas is found in the far west of the state, including parts of Mezquital, Pueblo Nuevo, San Dimas, Otáez, Santiago Papasquiaro, Tamazula, Topia, Canelas and Tepehuanes. The region is subdivided by the rugged, western flank of the Sierra Madre. The terrain features deep ravines, canyons and fast-flowing rivers. The Humaya, Tamazula, Los Remedios, Piaxtla, Presidio, and Baluarte rivers flow west to the Pacific through the state of Sinaloa. Further south, the Acaponeta, San Pedro Mezquital, and Huaynamota rivers flow southwest through the state of Nayarit. The region, especially its ravines and canyons, is hot and humid. It receives the most rainfall in the state. There is greater diversity of flora and fauna in its rainforests compared to the desert regions of the state. Animal species include pumas, white-tailed deer, armadillos, badgers, iguanas and a large number of bird species. At higher elevations, between 600 and 1200 meters, the vegetation changes to pine forests and the climate is more temperate. This area has had the most human habitation and agriculture.

When the Jesuits arrived to the Quebradas, they introduced the grazing of cattle and large-scale farming of corn, sugar cane and fruit trees. In the hotter and wetter areas, they introduced bananas, cherimoyas, guavas, zapotes, plums, avocados, oranges and other types of citrus. However, the difficulty of crossing the mountains to the more prosperous Valleys region limited the economy here.

Las Quebradas has mineral deposits, principally silver with some gold. Most of these deposits are found in an area that extends from the Humaya River to San Diego. During the 18th century, a number of royal mines were in operation here. They have been worked intermittently since them, with the last major activity in the late 19th and early 20th century. The deposits attracted Europeans, displacing the native Acaxes, Xiximes and other indigenous groups, whose numbers fell with the introduction of European diseases. Many of the towns in this area including Félix de Tamazula, Valle de Topia, Santa Veracruz de Topia, Nuestra Señora de la Asunción de Siánori, Santa María de Otáez and San José de Canelas began as mining towns.

The mountains over 3,000 meters above sea level are dominated by dramatic landscapes, including waterfalls, old-growth pine forests and ravines, such as the Basís Quebrada on the Presidio River. The sinkholes and rock formations, such as the El Espinazo del Diablo, are visible from the old highway to Mazatlan. It is one of the most representative landscapes of northwest Mexico. Cerro Gordo is the highest point in the state and is considered sacred to both the Tepehuanes and the Huichol people. This area is home to the La Michilía Biosphere Reserve, which is a pioneer for the reintroduction of the critically endangered Mexican grey wolf.

The Tecuan National Forest is in the Quebradas.

== Economy ==
As a rural state, traditional agriculture is still the main economic activity for most of the population, despite only ten percent of the land being suitable for crops, and only fifteen percent being suitable for pasture. The main crops include corn, beans, chilli peppers, apples, alfalfa, and sorghum. Fruits such as apples and pears are grown in Canatlán, Nuevo Ideal and Guatimapé; nuts in Nazas and San Juan del Rio; and membrillo, apricots and peaches in Nombre de Dios. Most agriculture is concentrated in the Valleys region, in particular, the municipalities of Guadalupe Victoria and Poanas. This is also the area with the highest profit agriculture. It is supported by its three main rivers: the Florida, the Alto Nazas, and the Tunal-Mezquital, which have been dammed primarily for agricultural purposes. Pastures in this area support large herds of cattle, much of which are exported to the United States. Sheep and goats are also raised here.

Despite its dry climate, another important agricultural area has been the La Laguna region. Cotton was the main commodity crop of the La Laguna from the late 19th century to the 1970s. While some cotton and other crops such as alfalfa, wheat, grapes, sorghum and corn are grown, it is limited to areas along the Nazas and Aguanaval rivers that provide irrigation. Most of the agricultural land is in the municipalities of Gómez Palacio, Lerdo and Tlahualilo, part of the Lagunera region. Tlahualilo is also known for the production of watermelon and other melons. The rest of the land is too dry. Livestock is another important activity raising sheep, goats, cattle and chickens.

In 1936, Mexican president Lázaro Cárdenas expropriated 225 profitable haciendas in the La Laguna region to create agricultural collectives called "ejidos." However, this effort failed to significantly improve life for poor farmers in the region, often due to a lack of knowledge and technology, especially in the redistribution of water. The failure of this effort exacerbated the effects of droughts leading to crises in the 1950s and 1960s, only overcome with massive federal investment in hydraulic infrastructure, public works and industrialization. However, the effects of these works still have negative consequences for the La Laguna region.

In the Sierra and Quebrada regions, most agriculture is subsistence for auto-consumption. Important crops include corn, beans, potatoes and oats. The Sierra is an important dairy producer, with its cheese notable in the state. In Las Quebradas, rivers are an important source of fish, especially trout and catfish.

Today, forestry has great importance economically and politically. About 41% of the territory is covered in forest with under five percent covered in rainforest. The state ranks second in Mexico in expanses of temperate forest land areas with 4.9 million ha. It is the country's main timber producer and the largest timber stock, estimated at 410,833,340 m^{3}. Its output accounts to between 20 and 30% of Mexico's total, producing mostly pine (73.3%) and oak. Although 18 municipalities have forestry operations, six account for just under 80% of the production. Most of the economy of the Sierra region revolves around forestry, including the sawmills and other wood processing facilities located there. Wood products from there are sold both in Durango and other parts of Mexico. They include plywood, furniture, shipping crates for agricultural products as well as pulp for paper. Most of this wood is pine but cedar is also cut in some areas of the Quebradas. Most forest land in the state is held by collectives called ejidos, but these have trouble competing with cheaper imported timber.

Minerals were the initial draw to the area for the Spanish, the heyday for this activity was the 18th century as most of the state's historical landmarks can attest. However, mining continues to be an important economic activity. Durango is one of Mexico's leading producers of gold. There are deposits of gold and silver in the Sierra region, San Dimas, Otáez and Topia. The Valleys region has deposits of gold, silver, iron and mercury.

Most of the state's commerce is related to agriculture and mining.

Gómez Palacio is home to most of the state's industry. There are factories which make cars, textiles, clothes, soap, oils, cookies, pasta and more. Food process, especially of chicken and dairy is important here as well.

Durango's main source of income from outside the state starting in the mid-20th century has been with the production of films. The first known filming in the state occurred when Thomas Edison sent producer James White and cameraman Fred Bleckynden here to film train rides, along with landscapes and scenes of daily life in 1897. The project produced six films, each fifty feet long and included bullfights, women washing clothes, road repair and the arrival of the train in the city of Durango. The first movie set was constructed in 1922 in the former La Trinidad hacienda just outside the city of Durango, which made three movies.

In 1954, 20th century Fox filmed the movie White Feather (La Ley del Bravo) with Robert Wagner and Debra Paget. It was the first Hollywood feature to be shot in the state, followed closely by Robber's Roost (Antro de ladrones) by United Artists. The two films mark the beginning of a movie industry that continues to the present day, although its heyday was in the 1960s and 1970s. The attractions for Hollywood here were the landscapes and the lighting. The first are similar to those of the Old West and the latter due to the climate. From 1954 to 1964, thirteen major productions were shot here and attracted stars such as Burt Lancaster, Audrey Hepburn, Charlton Heston, Maureen O'Hara and John Wayne who worked on films directed by the likes of John Huston and Sam Peckinpah. Between 1965 and 1973, John Wayne alone worked on seven films including the Sons of Katie Elder. During the 1970s a total of 86 films was shot here. Forty-three were U.S. productions; 33 were Mexican productions and nine where collaborations between the two countries.

To date, over 130 films have been shot here both because of the Western-type landscapes and the natural light. The state is still called La Tierra del Cine (Land of the Cinema) although movie production here has waned with the decline of westerns starting in the 1980s. Many of the old sets are still standing, if not used, and some have been converted into tourist attractions, and one has been converted into a real town.

Tourism is a small industry here, despite the state's natural resources and history. The government has worked to promote the state for tourism, but this is concentrated mostly on the capital (including the movie sets around the city), two other towns in the state and to some extent, ecotourism.

There are many historic and tourist sites in the Valleys region, in particular in the city of Durango. The San Juan del Rio municipality has the house in which Francisco Villa was born. There are several important architectural sites in the city, including the Ganot-Peschard Museum of Archeology, which is recognized by the National Institute of Anthropology and History as a site of historical significance. In Súchil, the former hacienda of El Mortero was the home of the Count of the Valley of Súchil and is one of the state's major examples of colonial architecture. The town of Mapimí has conserved its traditional urban layout which has permitted it to become a Pueblo Mágico. The most important mine is Ojuela, now famous for its hanging bridge which connects the town with the mine, separated by an extremely deep ravine. It one of the largest of its kind in the Americas. Nazas has a house that Benito Juárez slept in while he was here.

Probably the best-known tourist product of the state relates to scorpions. In the 1980s, a number of entrepreneurs turned the animal into an unofficial symbol of state pride. Most are sold encased in acrylic and mounted on knickknacks such as ashtrays, napkin holders, keychains, earrings, wood boxes and wall mountings. These objects dominate tourist markets such as the Gomez market in Durango City.

One reason for the limited economic development has been the limited transportation and other communications. The railroad was an important development in the late 19th and early 20th centuries but its benefits did not extend far past where the lines went. The state has one international airport serving the capital, which has limited flights to other major Mexican cities and to the United States. However, its geographical position is becoming a benefit, rather than a hindrance to economic development, with its proximity both to Mexico City and the northern border as well as both coasts.

As the nearest seaport, trade and travel to Mazatlan have always been important to the state. The port has been a source for luxury goods since the colonial period, generally paid for with silver mined in the state. The Interoceanic Highway now connects the state with both coasts, and cuts travel time to three hours, less than half what it was before.

== Media ==
Newspapers of Durango include: Contacto Hoy, Diario de Durango, El Siglo de Durango, El Sol de Durango, and Victoria de Durango.

== Demographics ==
=== Largest cities ===
Largest cities or towns in Durango Source:
Rank		Municipality	Pop.
1	Victoria de Durango	Durango	616,068
2	Gómez Palacio	Gómez Palacio	301,742
3	Ciudad Lerdo	Lerdo	96,243
4	Santiago Papasquiaro	Santiago Papasquiaro	30,063
5	El Salto	Pueblo Nuevo	26,678
6	Ciudad Guadalupe Victoria	Guadalupe Victoria	18,696
7	Vicente Guerrero	Vicente Guerrero	17,967
8	Nuevo Ideal	Nuevo Ideal	12,850
9	Ciudad Canatlán	Canatlán	11,943
10	Cuencamé de Ceniceros	Cuencamé	11,585

== Culture ==
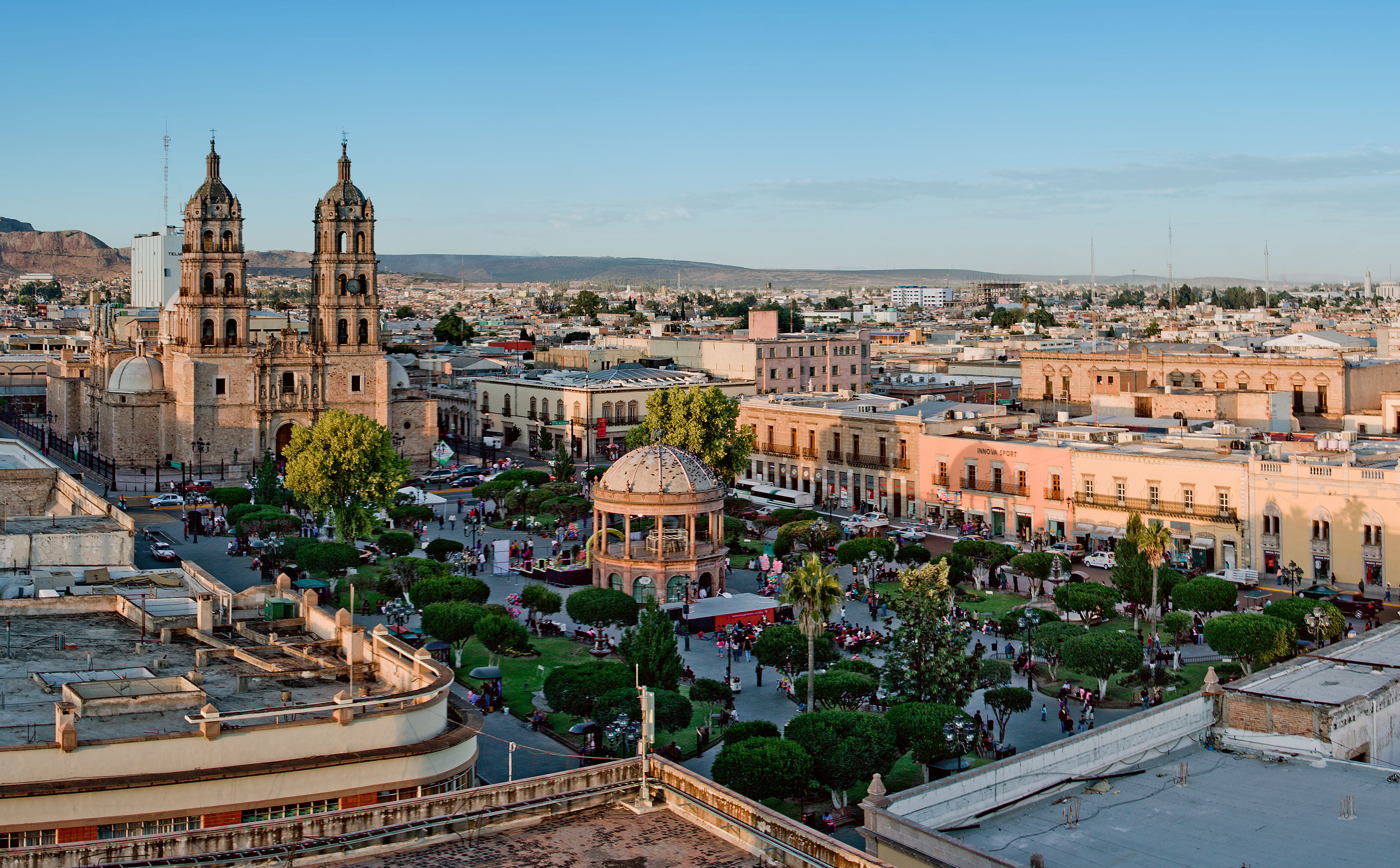
Plaza de Armas

Durango is a rural state. It is sparsely populated. The three main cities contain almost 65% of the total population (Durango – 35%, Gómez Palacio 20.1% and Lerdo 8.6%). The remaining 35% of the population is scattered among 37 small urban centers and 5,757 villages of less than 2,500 inhabitants. Ninety-one percent of these have less than 250 residents. The state is associated with elements of the wild frontier: banditry, Revolutionary battles, mining and drug traffic. It claims to be the birthplace of Francisco Villa.

For its history, Durango has been both a frontier and central Mexican entity, especially the city. During the colonial period, Durango eventually became one of the main cities of New Spain in part because it was both part of the center and periphery of the territory. One distinction the city has from other colonial cities is that it was not founded on or near a former indigenous population center. The indigenous here were (and are) distinct from those in the center and south culturally.

True to its dangerous reputation, the best-known animal of the state is the scorpion. The sting was possibly fatal in the past but the availability of antidote today makes this very rare. One reason why the creatures are so abundant is that the Sierra Madre Occidental make for perfect breeding grounds. Most scorpions range in size from one to twelve centimeters but a 17-centimeter one was found in 1963. Images of the animal appear drawn or etched into a variety of objects, but since the 1980s, the city of Durango has promoted souvenirs which have real dead scorpions encased in plastic. The arachnids are also cooked and served as a delicacy in markets such as Gomez in the capital. However, they were not traditionally eaten. Durango's soccer team is called the Scorpions.

The state likes to promote itself as the "Tierra del Cine" (Land of the Movies) due to its history of the making of Hollywood western. Today, some film and TV is still shot here.

=== Indigenous peoples ===
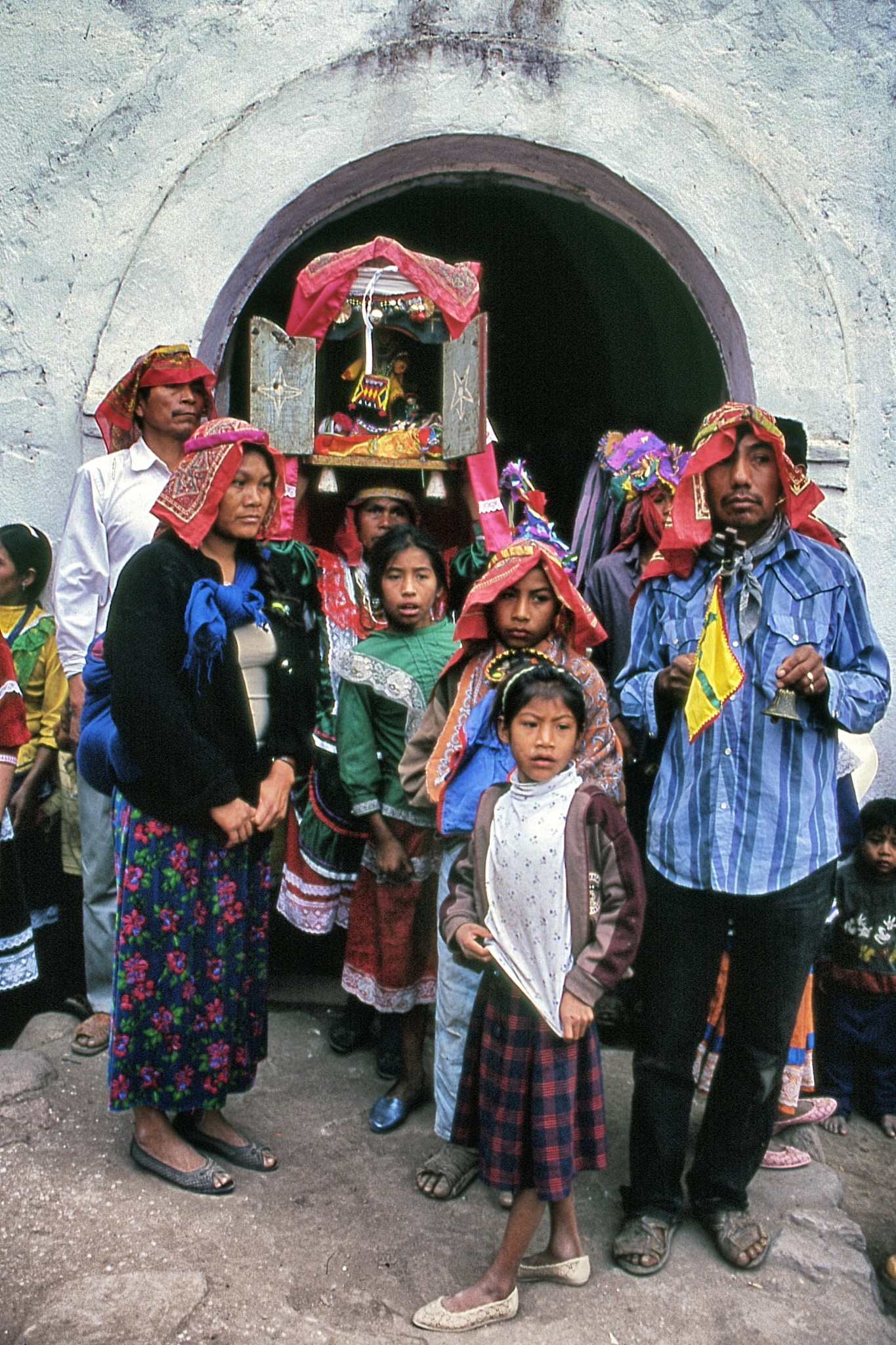
Mexicaneros during Candlemas celebrations in San Pedro Jícaras

Although a number of the state's indigenous ethnicities disappeared with the coming of the Spanish, there are still a significant amount residing in the state, most still speaking Uto-Azteca languages. The four main ethnicities are Tepehuans (North and South), Huichols, Tarahumaras and Mexicaneros. The Mexicaneros speak Nahuatl. The Coras and Huichols speak languages named after their groups and are fairly closely related to Nahuatl. The Tepehuano and Tarahumara languages are of the Pima branch. Language preservation varies from communities in which the language dominates to those in which only vestiges remain.

The Southern Tepehuans are the largest indigenous group in Durango. The name comes from Nahuatl and means "masters of the hills" or possibly "conquerors in battle." The Tepehuans call themselves o'dam, which means "those who inhabit." Indigenous resistance to Spanish colonization was particularly fierce there in the north. Eventually, Spanish might forced many to flee into the rugged mountains, where most of the indigenous communities still reside. It was this process that led to the northern and southern branches of the Tepehuan communities. Main Southern Tepehuan communities include Santa María de Ocotán, San Francisco, Teneraca, Taxicarinaga, San Bernardino de Milpillas and Lajas.

The Tepehuan religion is a syncretism of indigenous and Catholic beliefs. The most important type of ceremony is the mitote or xibtal, which centers on dance around a bonfire accompanied by one-stringed instruments. They are most common at the beginning and end of the agricultural cycle. For patron saint days, cattle are usually sacrificed for feasting, accompanied by the dance of the Matachines and violin music.

The second-largest indigenous group in Durango is the Huichol. Their communities are found on the edges of the state that border with Nayarit and Jalisco, where the Huichol are more numerous. The Huichol here identify with those in the other states, there is no separation.

The Mexicaneros are the remnants of the indigenous brought by the Spanish from central Mexico to colonize the region. Today, only a small number survive in the communities of San Agustín de Buenaventura and San Pedro Jícaras in the municipality of Mezquital. This is a mixed ethnic zone and they live near groups of Tepehuanos and Huichols who have traditionally been their enemies. Their presence as a community was practically unknown until the academic work of Honrad T. Preuss in the late 19th century. More recent studies of the people have been carried out by Neyra Patricia Alvarado.

The Tarahumaras are mostly in the state of Chihuahua but there are communities in the far north of Durango. The Coras have some presence in communities near the Northern Tepehuanos, although they are more numerous in Nayarit and Jalisco. The Northern Tepehuanos are profoundly religious but language and culture is not significantly different from those in the south.

=== Handcrafts ===
The craft items of the state are very similar to those of Zacatecas and Chihuahua. Most of the items made are utilitarian and ceremonial. They are less known compared to those of the middle and south of the country. Many craft items are still important to local cultures and identities.

The most widespread and developed handcraft in the state is pottery, found in just about all of the territory. All of the indigenous groups produce pottery, almost all for utilitarian and ceremonial purposes. There is more modern and varied pottery and ceramics in southern Durango, especially in and around the state capital in the municipalities of Durango, Poanas and Villa Unión. Common products include flower pots, jars, pots and cazuelas (large cooking vessels). The most decorative pottery is found in and around the city proper, with techniques such as pastillaje (laying small rolls or balls of clay over a pot before firing to make a raised design) and sgraffito, especially in the newer generations of pottery. Pottery production is still done by hand, often using crude wheels and local deposits of clay. The clays vary by region including the kaolin found in Peñón Blanco and Cuencamé. Those found in the Guadiana Valley produce cream tones. Green, red and white clays are found all over the state depending on the other minerals found in the soil of the area.

There are a number of notable artisans who produced glazed pieces, including José Trinidad (Trino) Núñez and Rafael del Campo. Other important artisans include Margarito Palacios, Santos Vega and Catarino González. In Gómez Palacio and Ciudad Lerdo, there are some workshops doing high-fire work.

The next most-widely done work is basketry and other items made with stiff fibers. These include baskets proper, carrying nets or bags, petites, sombreros, furniture and decorative items made from ixtle, wicker, mesquite roots, reeds, pine needles, pine strips and cactus ribs.

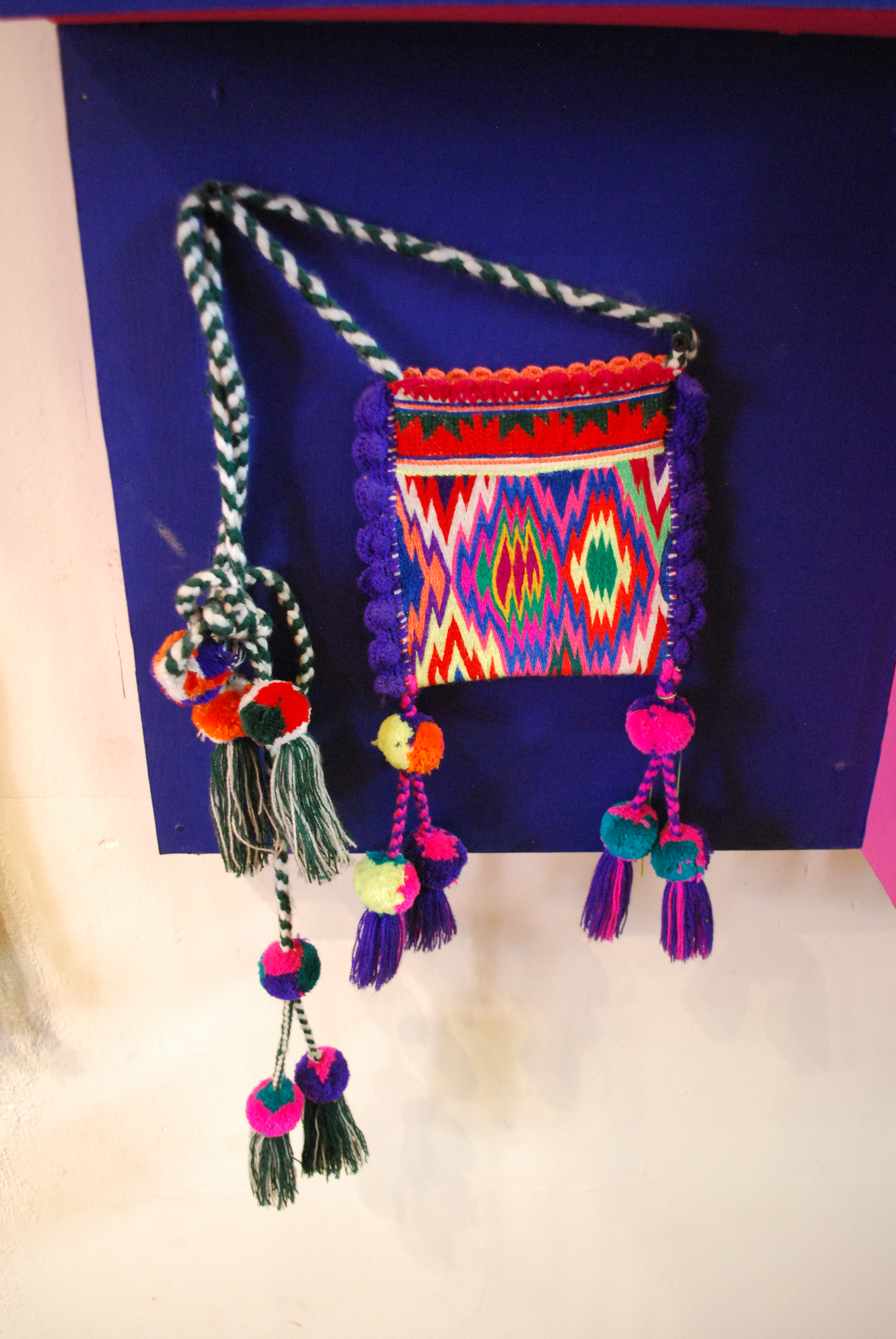
Small Tepehuan carrying bag in traditional design

Textile work is produced all over the state, using cotton, ixtle, lechugilla and wool usually to make clothing. Cloth made with both backstrap and pedal looms are found frequently, but the most-commonly made items are knitted. Embroidery is also widespread.

Indigenous crafts include embroidered clothing, household utensils, farm tools and ceremonial objects. The Huichols are noted for the making of sombreros, carrying bags, and items adorned with beads. They also make some items with wood and clay. Huichol handcrafts are distinguished by the use of symbols from their cosmology and include pottery, embroidery, yarn paintings and beadwork. The Tepehuans make bows and arrows, sombreros, traditional clothing and baskets. The Tarahumara make bows and stone-tipped arrows, ceramics, flutes and drums. The Mexicaneros and Southern Tepehuanos are noted for the making of morrales (carrying bags) with geometric designs. The Tarahumara and Northern Tepehuanes are noted for baskets made with pine strips, as well as those made from palm fronds and cane.

Leatherwork includes bags, wallets, belts, cigarette cases, briefcases, books and saddles. The working of volcanic stone (cantera) almost died out but has experienced something of a comeback. The work has a history from the colonial period when the first craftsmen arrived to work on the Cathedral. The main volcanic stone in Durango is white. At the end of the 19th century and beginning of the 20th, the Montoya family, headed by brothers Jesús and Matías, then Benigno and Francisco, come from Troncoso, Zacatecas to work with the local stone. Today, there are about a dozen workshops in and around the city. Cabinetry and furniture-making is a dying art but can still be found in the Durango municipality. Major producers of traditional wares include the Pescador family and Saúl García Franco. Some communities make cartonería and fireworks items for festivas such as toritos, castillos and Judas effigies.

=== Other aspects of the culture ===
Juárez University sponsors the School of Painting, Sculpture and Handcrafts which teaches both fine and folk art. Handcraft instruction includes textiles, ceramics and glasswork. The glasswork includes delicate flower vases, glassware and multicolored decorative wall hangings.

Much of the state's cuisine is based on corn, although wheat products such as flour tortillas and various breads are readily found. Beef is important but pork dishes are also common. As much of Durango has a colder climate, especially in the higher elevations, soups are popular as a main as well as a first course. While relatively isolated from central Mexico, there is strong influence here from that region.

One of the best known dishes, caldillo duranguense, is essentially a hearty beef soup with roasted green chili peppers. Gorditas are a particularly popular and important food historically, as they were a mainstay for field hands who found the pockets of corn or wheat convenient for carrying and eating meats and sauce outside of the home. Although found in other parts of Mexico, tacos de tripe (intestines) are particularly popular here. Asado rojo de puerco, known as asado de boda in other parts of north-central Mexico is popular. Tamales are popular but they are smaller and have more meat than those made further south. Moles are popular as well. There is barbacoa, but the meat used is as often beef as it is the mutton used farther south. Popular northern dishes include machaca as well as burritos, influence from neighboring Chihuahua. During Lent population (most Catholics) tend to lean toward vegetarian dishes with or without cheese, as fish is not common in the diet of this landlocked state. Local specialties include pinole, which is best known in Santiago Papasquiaro.

The raising of cattle in various parts leads to the making of a variety of cheeses. Some, like manchego and asadero, are available in other parts of the north, but local varieties such as queso ranchero are also consumed. Concentrated sweet paste made from quince is often called cajeta (used for a milk product in other parts of Mexico) as well as the more common name of ate. Other traditional sweets are similar to those found in central Mexico.

The most important secular celebration of the state is the Durango State Fair (Feria de Durango) which has occurred each year since 1948. The first fair queen was crowned in 1950. The most important annual events in the Semi-desert region are the municipal fairs of Gómez Palacio, Mapimí and Santa Ana in Nazas. In the Valleys region the most important annual events are the Apple Festival in Canatlán and the Nut Festival in San Juan del Rio. Important religious observances include those in La Sauceda in Canatlán, El Nayar, La Sierra de Gampon in Guadalupe Victoria and El Tizonazo in Indé. In the Sierra region, most towns observe the feast days of their patron saint with plays based on Biblical stories. Celebrations related to Christmas and the New Year are also important.

In Quebradas, patron saint days are important and often feature indigenous music. The Tepehuans continue the tradition of the mitote, a kind of ceremonial dance, three times per year: in February to ask for health, in May to call the rains and in October to celebrate the first harvests of corn. Those of Mexica, Huicholes and Tarahumara also conserve many aspects of their traditional dance and music.

Traditional music ranges from the purely indigenous to that from Europe, often with mixtures. The state has produced a number of noted musicians including composer Silvestre Revueltas, concert pianist Ricardo Castro, composer and musician Alberto M. Alvarado and contralto Fanny Anitúa. The oldest popular music in the region consists of jarabes and sones which can be found in other parts of Mexico. After 1840, new musical forms came to the state including polkas, shottises, gavotas, redovas, waltzes and other forms from Central Europe. They were first introduced to the upper classes but were adopted by others to eventually form much of northern Mexican music. The first locally produced variations included polkas such as El Revolcadero, Las Virginias, Las Cacerolas and El Jaral as well as shottis called Amor de Madre. The most noted local musician is Alberto M. Alvarado, who was active during the late 19th and early 20th century. His waltz, Recuerdo, is considered emblematic of the state at that time. He also composed works with patriotic themes such as Cuauhtémoc, Corazón Latino and Danza Yaqui. During the Revolution, corridos became popular such as Adelita, La Rielera and Carabina Treinta Treinta by Benjamín Argumedo. These became the basis for the latter narcocorridos which portray the activities of drug traffickers. Mestizo dance and music includes polkas, which became established here during the Mexican Revolution. In the center and south of the state a traditional dance called the choti can be found. The best known of these include El Amor de Madre, El Revolcadero, Los Arbolitos and El Senderito.

Bullfighting was a popular spectator sport for many years. Cockfights are still popular in the state as well as horse racing in rural areas. Many of these occur during fairs and patron saint days. Until the popularity of sports from the United States such as baseball, the most popular sport in the state was a Basque game called rebote often played against the walls of the Catheral in Durango until this was banned in 1769. Courts were constructed on the outskirts of town and remained popular until about the mid-20th century.

Sister cities include Durango, Colorado and Durango, Spain which was arranged in 1984.

== History ==
=== Conquest and colonial period ===
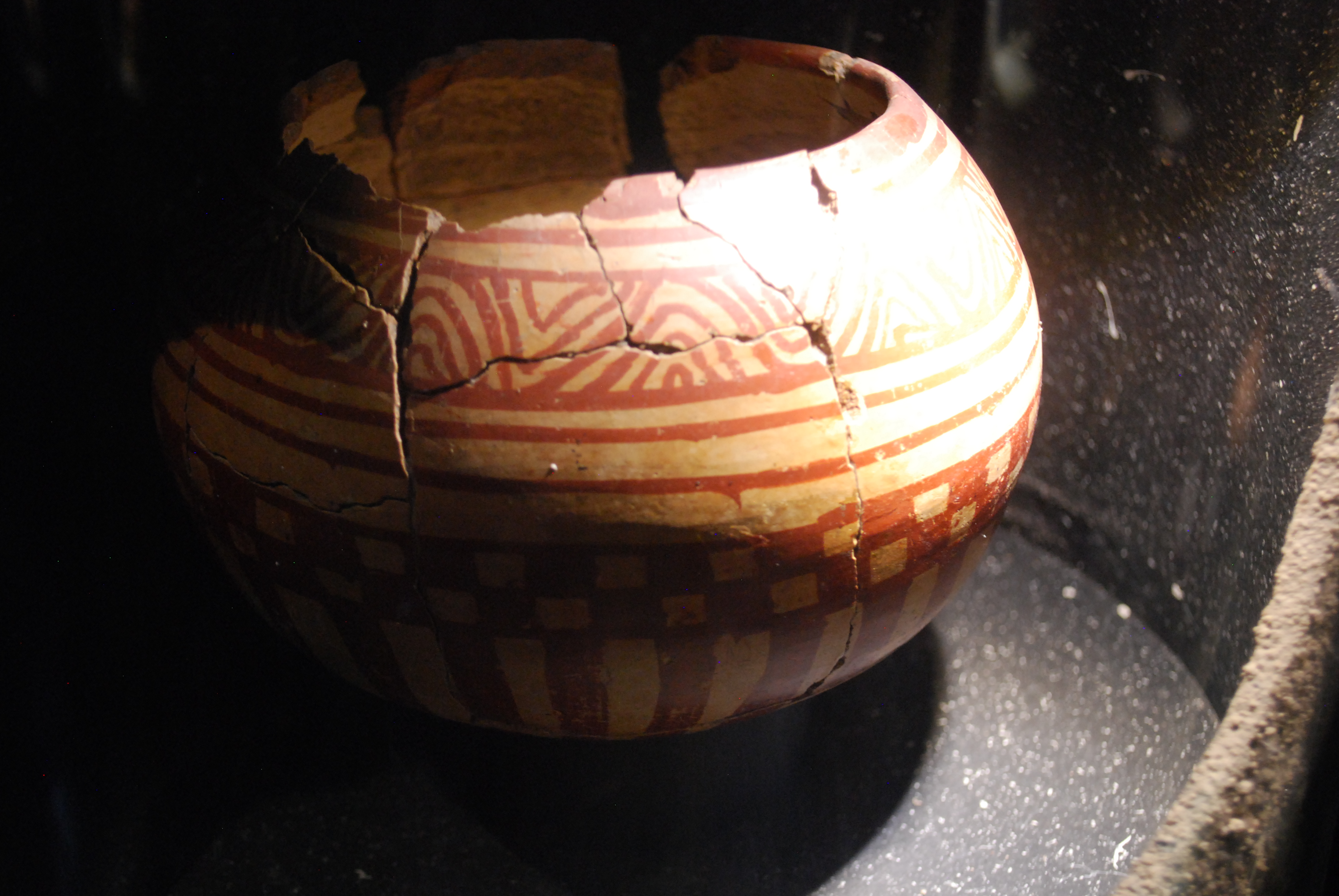
Azatlan-style pottery at the Durango City Archeological Museum

Durango sits on a corridor that linked central Mexico with the northwest. Before the arrival of the Spanish, the area had attracted migration into it by Huichols, Coras, Tepehuanos and Tarahumaras. These were sedentary people whose spread was checked by hostility from nomadic tribes. The eastern edge of the state was dominated by Chichimecas (particularly the Zacatecos and Caxcanes) and various tribes of the Laguna region, which were distinguished by their informal social structure and nudity.

Durango was the center of a colonial entity called Nuevo Vizcaya or sometimes México del Norte (Northern Mexico). It included all or part of what are now Durango, Chihuahua, Sinaloa, Sonora and Arizona. The diocese also included all or part of New Mexico, Colorado, Coahuila, Texas, Zacatecas, California and Baja California.

The first Spaniard in this area was José de Angulo who arrived to the Sierra de Topia in 1532. The next expedition into the area occurred in 1552 under Ginés Vázques de Mercado, arriving to where the city of Durango is now, naming the area the Guadiana Valley after an area in Spain with a similar environment. The Cerro de Mercado is named after him, and the city is named after Durango in Spain. Other explorers such as Nuño de Guzmán, Alvar Cabeza de Vaca and Juan de Tapia realized expeditions but were not successful in establishing a permanent presence. However, the expedition of Cabeza de Vaca gave rise to the myth of the cities of gold and silver called Cibola and Quivira. The other expeditions would give rise to claims to the area by Jalisco and Michoacán.

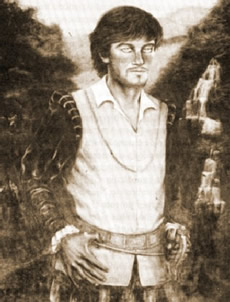
Captain Francisco de Ibarra

The Spanish left the area alone for a time but the discovery of silver and other metals in Zacatecas in 1546 renewed interest in the area. Francisco de Ibarra was sent northwest from Zacatecas by his uncle Diego de Ibarra and the viceroy. Ibarra worked to conquer and hold the territory from 1554 to 1567. After being named conqueror and governor in 1562, Ibarra settle in San Juan (del Río) and constructed a fort. From here he directed the discovery and exploitation of various mines in the state. He divided the new territory into six provinces: Guadiana, Copala, Maloya, Chiametla, Sinaloa and Santa Barbara, naming a head of government for each. Holding the land proved difficult, with Ibarra needing to reconquer areas especially in the outer periphery of Nuevo Vizcaya both because of indigenous attacks as well as the rugged terrain. Much of the territory would not be subdued until late in the 18th century.

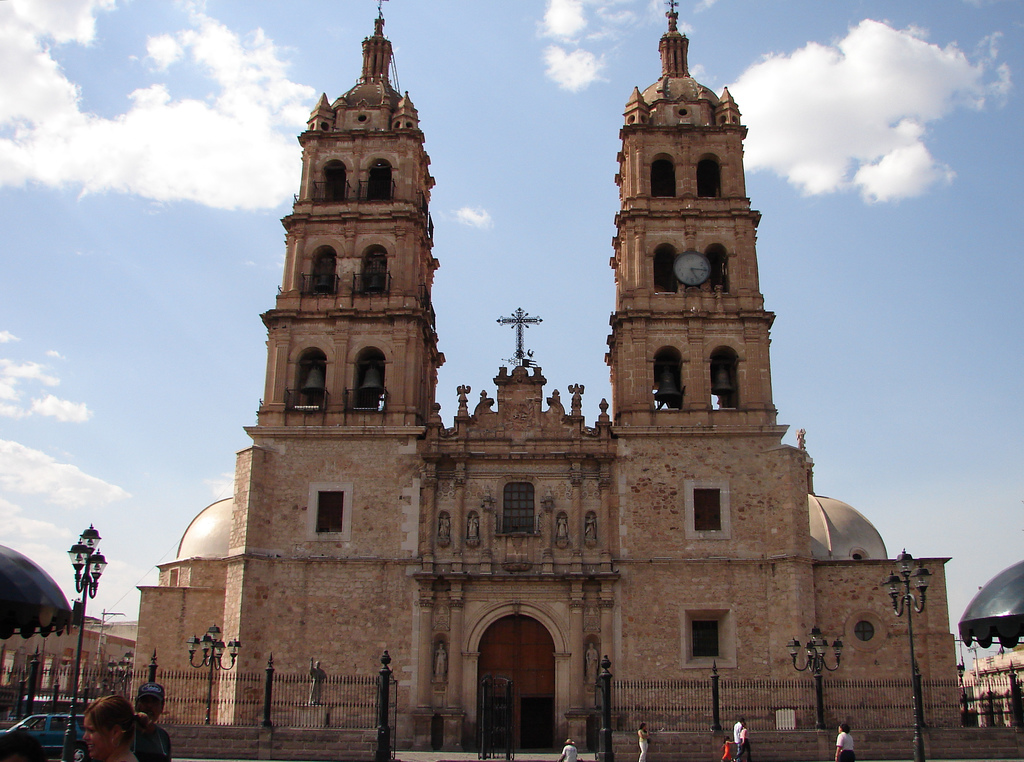
Catedral basílica de Victoria de Durango

The city of Durango was officially established on July 8, 1563 with a mass celebrated by Brother Diego de Cadena where 5 de Febrero and Juarez Streets are now. It was founded specifically to be the capital of Nueva Vizcaya, near both to the new mines and the royal road connecting Mexico City and points north. The name Durango comes from Ibarra's hometown for some time the city was called Durango and Guadiana interchangeably.

It is distinct from cities further north as it was laid out when Philip II's Ordenanzas and Descubrimiento y Población order was still in effect. The cathedra began as the parish church, which was made with adobe with a straw roof (the last church of this construction is found in Ocotán, Durango). However, it burned down in the colonial period, leading to the construction of the current structure over time.

Most of the other colonial period towns were founded as missions and or as mining centers. The first mining towns were Pánuco and Avino established in 1562. El Mezquital was founded in 1588. In 1597, the town of Santiago Papasquiaro and the mission of Santa Catarina de Tepehuanes was founded. Cuencamé was founded in 1598.

The first hospital in the state, Hospital de Caridad, was founded in 1588 in Nombre de Dios. The first hospital in the capital was the Hospital de San Cosme y San Damián, founded in 1595, the same year that the first school, the Colegio de Gramática, was founded.

The Spanish began the process of consolidating their power by the establishment of missions. The first was a Franciscan mission in Nombre de Dios in 1558. After, missions were established in Peñol (Peñón Blanco), San Juan Bautista del Río, Analco, Indé, Topia, La Sauceda, Cuencamé and El Mezquital. The Jesuits joined the Franciscans starting in 1590 and both orders began organizing the territory using Spanish norms. Later missions spread to Mapimí, Santiago Papasquiaro, Tepehuanes, Guanaceví, Santa María del Oro, Tamazula, Cerro Gordo (Villa Ocampo) and San Juan de Bocas (Villa Hidalgo). Originally the territory was under the archdiocese of Guadalajara, but it proved too difficult to administer the large territory. In 1620, Pope Paul V established a new archdiocese in the city of Durango, with Gonzalo de Hermosillo as the first archbishop.

The city was officially recognized as such in 1631, receiving its coat-of-arms; however, it almost disappeared during the early colonial period. The indigenous of the area resisted Spanish domination from the beginning. In 1606, the Acaxes rebelled against the Spanish due to their enslavement to work in mines. The first century of Spanish occupation saw large rebellions by the Tepehuans and Tarahumaras. These continued into most of the 17th century and the Tarahumaras continued into the century after that. The Tepehuan uprising of 1616, the most significant uprising of this time period. It almost caused the abandonment of the capital city, with the government moving to Parral for a time, but in the end, the Tepehuan were forced to flee into the mountains, dividing the ethnicity into north and south. The conquest of New Vizcaya was formally finished with the signing of several treaties with indigenous groups in 1621 and 1622. Durango city did not start growing again until 1680. This was because the mines in Parral had started to give out and the violence had been reduced enough by Spanish authorities. By the late 17th century, the city was ringed by haciendas, especially for sheep, which helped support the city.

The subduing of the local native peoples did not completely end indigenous hostilities. In the 18th century Apaches and Comanches migrated in, being displaced by what is now the United States. Their attacks on towns and haciendas continues well into the late 19th century. Despite these difficulties, Durango was a base for the conquest and settlement of points north including Saltillo, Chihuahua and Parral into what is now Arizona, New Mexico and Texas, along with numerous other communities on the Pacific coast from Nayarit into California.

Durango's economic heyday came in the 18th century, when mines such as Guanaceví, Cuencamé and San Juan del Río began to produce in 1720. The first major mine owner of the era was José del Campo Soberrón y Larrea, who built a palatial residence for himself in the city of Durango in 1776 and received the title of Count of the Valley of Suchil. Starting in the second half of the 18th century, more mines came online. The next major mine owner was Juan José Zambrano, whose mines in Guarizamay did not earn him a noble title but did give him political power in the area. He constructed the second major palatial residence of the city of Durango. However, Zambrano's activities were curtailed by the problems caused by the American Revolution and other wars disrupting commerce with England, leading to shortages of mercury, essential for the extraction of silver.

In 1778, the Spanish government opened up trade in more Pacific ports, including Mazatlan, which had an economic benefit to Durango. Not only did products from the area have an outlet, incoming merchandise destined for Chihuahua and Zacatecas passed through the area. This attracted business people including foreign ones from Germany, England, France and Spain who built large businesses here in the 19th century.

During its height, Durango City's religious and cultural culture rivaled that of continental Europe even being a center for Italian liturgical music despite its isolation. The Durango Cathedral has one of the larger collections of 18th-century cathedral music in the America, roughly comparable to those in Oaxaca and Bogotá, but smaller than that of Mexico City. Much of the work is that of José Bernardo Abella Grijalva and most shows Italian influence. The historic center of the city and a number of haciendas reflect its 18th-century colonial heritage.

=== 19th century ===
During Mexico's War of Independence, Nuevo Vizcaya began to break up. The first divisions were the creation of the states of Chihuahua and Durango, with Santiago Baca Ortiz as the first governor of the state of Durango along with the separation of the Sinaloa province, which included Sonora and Arizona. The state of Coahuila was separated shortly thereafter. With the 1824 Constitution the states of Durango and Chihuahua were created. Mining was depressed at the time, and the governor negotiated with the English to explore deposits of iron on the Cerro de Mercado. The English constructed installations such as those in Piedras Azules (La Ferrería) to process iron ore. These required large quantities of charcoal, which led to mass deforestation in the area. This eventually made the plant unviable.

Public education was first established in the state in 1824. The first secular institute of higher education in the state was the Colegio Civil y la Academia de Juisprudencia founded in 1833.

The northeast of the state had problems industrializing mostly due to incursions by Apaches into Durango which began in 1832 and later Comanches. Attacks by Comanches remain a major problem until the 1850s, forcing haciendas and textile mills to build walls around them. Counter-attacks on the Comanches diminished their raids, but they did not stop completely until the 1880s.

The rise of the state's second economic and political center, the cities of Gómez Palacio and Lerdo began in the 19th century, when cotton began to be planted along the Nazcas River. This cotton production became important, with sales of the raw material to Mexico City and to European textile mills, especially in England. Large-scale production began in the mid-century, dominating the local economy by the 1870s. Textile production also began here, although shortly after this industry would shift to Torreon. Other textile mills were established in areas such as Tunal, Santiago Papasquiaro, Poanas and Peñon Blanco, but the lack of coal meant that power had to be provided by nearby rivers, which was not efficient enough. This and attacks during the Mexican Revolution brought the demise of the textile industry in the state. Many mills and cotton haciendas eventually wound up in the hands of American investors.

The civil war between liberals and conservatives had the state controlled by liberal forces in 1858, then by conservative ones from 1864 to 1866.

In the late 19th century, rail and telegraph lines reached the state and revitalized Gómez Palacio and Lerdo as industrial centers. The railroad connected the city of Durango with Mexico City and the US border, allowing for shipment of local goods, particularly those from mining, to national and foreign markets. Agriculture and livestock production increased with the end of Comanche insurgencies and the arrival of a train line in 1892 gave the city a new connection with the rest of Mexico. It directly connected the city with Piedras Negras, Coahuila allowing the export of iron ore to foundries in Monclova, where coal was abundant. In 1902, a branch of the railroad reached Tepehuanes, allowing for the exploitation of natural resources in the northwest of the state.

However, the city of Durango remained the political center of the state as well as the regional commercial center for agricultural and handcrafted products. Mayors of the city at this time concentrated on improving infrastructure, such as government buildings, hospitals, water supply lines and public streets. The population of the city grew during this time.

=== 20th century to the present ===
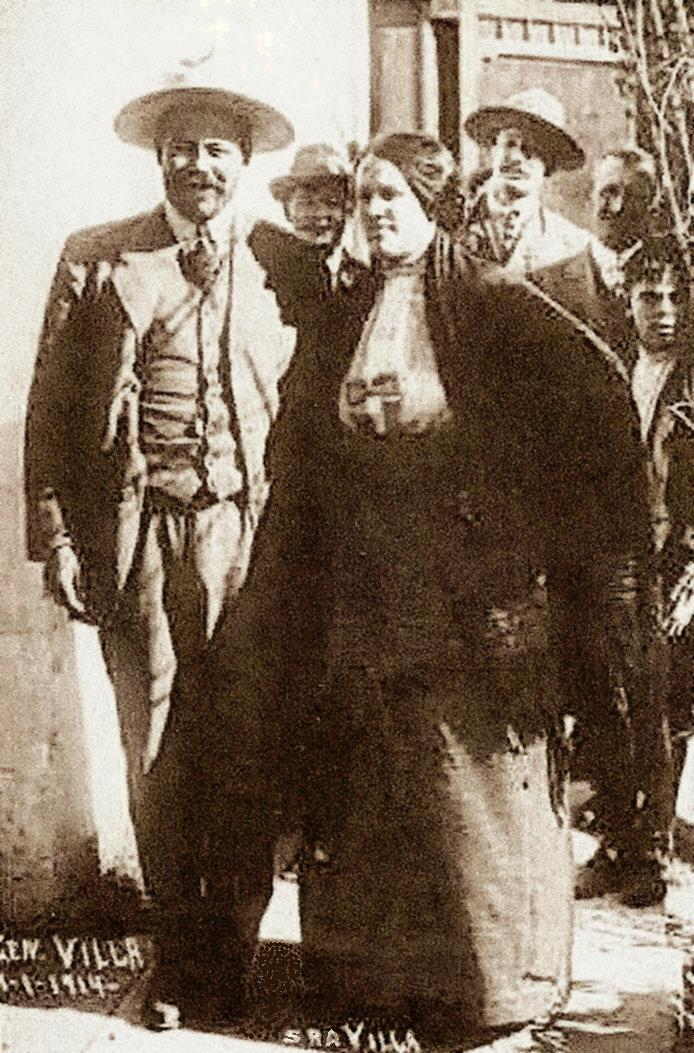
Photo of Gen. Pancho Villa and his wife, Sra. María Luz Corral de Villa (1914)

While the state received high amounts of investment leading to economic development in the late 19th and very early 20th centuries, the benefits were mostly to foreign enterprises, often given permission to operate on indigenous lands and other rural communities. By 1910, North Americans own just about the entire southwest Sierra Madre Occidental region of the state or 65% of the land of the entire state. These areas have the highest concentrations of mining and timber resources.

Durango was one of the areas active during the Mexican Revolution. The first uprising in the state occurred on November 19, 1910 in Gómez Palacio. Various revolutionary leaders were from here and/or used the state as a base of operations including Francisco Villa, Calixto Contreras, Severingo Cenceros, J. Agustín Castro and Oreste Pereyra, especially in the La Lagunera region. The Division del Norte had a base in the Hacienda de la Loma to unite forces in Durango and Chihuahua.

The economic effects on the state were profound. There was a mass exodus of foreigners and a loss of production in both haciendas and factories. On June 18, 1913, insurgents took the city of Durango, burning businesses here. The war led to economic depression that lasted for decades. After the war, there was a process of land redistribution that lasted several decades, but it did not affect the largest land holdings on the most productive of lands. After the Revolution, large land holdings were broken up into ejidos under governor Enrique R. Calderón, particularly in the Comarca Lagunera de Durango. During the same time the municipalities of Mapimí and Goméz Palacio were split off from the municipality of Tlahualilo.

Despite Durango's support during the Revolution, the new government had trouble controlling the state as late as the 1930s as it resisted federal modernization efforts. The questions of land reform and education were central to Durango's discontent during this time period. Between 1926 and 1936, militias were formed to participate in the Cristero War and other uprisings such as the Escobar Military Revolt in 1929. One major point of contention was the government's efforts to take the church out of secular life, especially education, which threatened centuries-old ways of life, especially for many farmers and villagers. These rebellions were strongest in the center and south of the state, including the capital of Victoria de Durango. Rebel activity in parts of Mezquital were such that secular teachers were withdrawn for a time.

In the mid-20th century, several institutions of higher education were established, including universities and institutes of technology. This included the establishment of the UJED at the former Jesuit college in the city of Durango.

The two newest municipalities were established in the latter 20th century. Vicente Guerrero was split from Suchil and the last, Nuevo Ideal, was created in 1989.

The destruction of Durango's city center during the Mexican Revolution led to development outside of it. The first neighborhood, Colonia Obrera, was established near the rail line just outside what was the city proper. It was the first of various neighborhoods to follow these lines. The population grew noticeably in the 1960s and 1970s mostly due to migration from rural areas, increasing urban sprawl to 1,058 hectares. One major factor of this growth was the droughts of this time on agricultural production as well as expectations of industrial development. About the same time, the city government started efforts to regulate this growth.

The growth of the cities has prompted projects in infrastructure, especially in transportation from the latter 20th century to the present. Industrial parks such as Durango and Gómez Palacio were established. The most recent projects have an eye towards connecting the state better to participate in the global economy. In the 20th century, the Pan American highway was built through here (known today as Highway 45). However, a later reconstruction of the highway shifted it east into Zacatecas. This meant that any industrial progress in the state happened in the northern city of Gómez Palacio, and not in the capital. In the 1980s, highways to Gómez Palacio and Ciudad Juarez were modernized, and a highway to Torreón and Monterrey was built. The InterOceanic Highway, which crosses the north of Mexico to connect the Gulf of Mexico to the Pacific Ocean is Highway 40. The most important leg of this highway for Durango is that which connects it from the capital to Mazatlán, Sinaloa. It cut the drive time between the two places to four hours, replacing a winding mountain road plagued by bandits for many decades. The centerpiece of this highway is the Baluarte Bridge, one of the highest suspension bridges in the world. Pride in this construction can be seen in the city of Durango, with a replica of the bridge found to the side of the Guadiana Park.

Durango has historically been an area associated with banditry and smuggling. Durango is part of the "golden triangle" of Mexico's drug trade. Most of the violence is due to turf battles between the Sinaloa and Gulf cartels. The 2000s were a particularly difficult time as this was during Felipe Calderon's efforts to combat the drug cartels and for a time Joaquin Guzman ("El Chapo") hid out in the state. Most of the violence was in relation to control over the drug routes here. Drug-related violence was a major problem, with hundreds of bodies found in clandestine graves, around the city of Durango in particular. The violence reached a peak here between 2009 and 2011. Highway robberies were also a particular problem, especially on the highway leading to Mazatlan, then considered the most dangerous in Mexico. A new toll highway was built and opened at the end of this period to combat this.

== See also ==
- Administrative divisions of Mexico
