= Canatlán Municipality =

Municipality in the Mexican state of Durango

Canatlán
- Municipality
- Municipality of Canatlán in Durango

- Location in Mexico
- Coordinates: 24°12′30″N 105°30′15″W
- Country: Mexico
- State: Durango
- Municipal seat: Ciudad Canatlán

Area
  - Total: 468,643.1 km^{2} (180,944.1 sq mi)

Population (2015)
  - Total: 32,852
  - Density: 0.070100/km^{2} (0.18156/sq mi)
- Time zone: UTC-6 (Zona Centro)

Canatlán is a municipality in the Mexican state of Durango. Its municipal seat is the city of Ciudad Canatlán. The municipality covers an area of approximately 468643.1 km^{2}.

As of 2015 census, the municipality had a total population of 32,852. In the 2010 census, the city of Canatlán had a population of 11,495. Apart from the municipal seat, the municipality included 327 localities, the largest of which, as of 2010, were: José Guadalupe Aguilera (Santa Lucía) (1,719), Ricardo Flores Magó (1,467), Veny Carranza (Ocotán) (1,259), San José de Gracia (1,256), and Nicolás Bravo (1,253).

== History ==
The first Jesuit priests arrived in the town of Durango after the insurrection of Tepehuana on January 29, 1620, and built new missions in places where they had previously been established. Franciscan priests built on a small plain near La Sauceda, a mission which they named San Diego de Canatlán. The area was named Canatlan, meaning "nest of land next to water or nesting ground and water", after the mission. The oldest document found Canatlán dates to January 3, 1623, and is a certification made by Fray Diego de Espinoza, president of the Convent of San Diego de Canatlán Mission San Diego de Canatlán, founding the town. As Canatlán is in the foothills of the valley it was previously called the Valley (Valle de La Sauceda). Since the 1917 Constitution, the city of Canatlán is the seat of the municipality.

== Geography ==
Canatlán is located between latitude 24° 12'30" and 24° 50'30" north latitude and the meridian 105° 30'15" and 104° 26'45" west longitude, at an average altitude of 2,000 meters above mean the sea. Bordered on the north by the municipalities of Nuevo Ideal and Santiago Papasquiaro, on the south and southeast with the municipality of Durango, on the east by the municipalities of San Juan del Río, and Pánuco Comonfort Conet Coronado, west and southwest by the municipality of San Dimas.

It is divided into 156 localities, of which the most important are Canatlán, San Diego de Alcalá, Donato Guerra, J. Guadalupe Aguilera, La Sauceda, El Tule, San José de Gracia and Santa Lucia.

=== Rivers ===
- La Sauceda: Tributary of Rio Tunal.
- Pigeons: Tributary of Rio Santiago.
- Willow Creek.
- Arroyo Mimbres, tributary of Rio Sauceda.

These rivers run either along Durango and though Durango.

=== Weather ===
Most of the township has a semi-cold climate, the annual average temperature of 15.4 °C. The last snowfall was on 12 December 1997.

== Ethnic groups ==
According to the results presented in the Second Census of Population and Housing in 2005, a total of 77 people who spoke an indigenous language lived in the municipality.

== Education ==
In the town there are the infrastructure of social benefit, which serve to provide education at various levels such as 100 in kindergarten, 92 primary, 96 secondary schools, 4 middle school, 5 high schools, two normal and three commercial academies.

== Health ==
The health care is provided by the IMSS, SS, ISSSTE, BMS and public clinics. In rural care covers the SSS, IMSS, as well as the units of IMSS-Solidaridad.

== Housing ==
Urban concentration is given in the municipal, developing some programs to promote housing with government support. The municipality has 7.129 housing; home ownership is private, relying mostly with the basic services of urban support. The type of housing construction is of mud and brick. According to the results presented in the Second Census of Population and Housing in 2005, the township has a total of 7130 households, out of which 7047 are private.

== Public services ==
The town offers its residents the services of electricity, water and sewer, parks and gardens, street lighting, recreation center, sports, market, cemetery and public safety.

7.129 There are occupied homes, of which 100% have running water and electricity and 73% drain. Plant has a waste water treatment in use, with installed capacity of 33.00 liters per second and the volume sought to 708.684 meters of timber annually.

The municipality has 264.1 kilometers of roads, 96.7 kilometers paved, 152.9 km of rural roads and 74.5 kilometers covered improved breaches, has an airfield with a runway length of 1.500 meters.

There is a telegraph office, two microwave stations and 7 receiving earth stations and 25 post offices.

The existing municipal market, supplies 75% of the towns, the city administers the services of park and gardens, public buildings, sports and recreational units, monuments and fountains.

== Landmarks ==
Hacienda La Sauceda, colonial style, built by the Jesuits in the seventeenth century. Parish Canatlán colonial style, built in the eighteenth century and rebuilt twice, the first in the early nineteenth century and the second in 1914. Helmet Guatimapé hacienda and church in ruins, colonial style, the eighteenth century, municipal presidency in 1934 and school J. Guadalupe Aguilera, colonial, with adaptations carried out at the beginning of this century.

== Museums ==
There is a community museum in the Commonwealth of Gomelia in which most of the new exhibition are remnants of pre-Hispanic cultures, such as arrows, points of obsidian, pottery and a skull taken from a cave that was believed was a ceremonial center, among others.

== Fiestas, dances and traditions ==
Festivals

Since 1950 takes place between 23 and 30 September of the Apple Fair in Canatlan, at the initiative of Mr. Francisco Treviño Martínez then mayor, helping in the organization by Mr. Baltazar Espinoza, Don Pedro Flores, and Ms. Victoria Villareal Reyes. Is fair, now is regional and is held from 12 to 16 September.

Legends

Those who speak of the treasures of the Earl of Súchil.

Customs and Traditions

On March 1 they worship the Divine Shepherd.

Music

Canatlán Township, has the "Corridos of Canatlan"

Crafts

Ceramics "Canatlán" is a red striped pottery first appeared on stage Tunal River by the year 1100 AD and continued being used for 1150–1350. Its origin is uncertain. The early experiments with red decoration on pots simple brown color can represent a first approach to the ceramic group. However, the local decor suggests a common design on the straps that are used to carry water jars. In this way and others, as much as Canatlán is a repeat of red on tan male culture of the Loma de San Gabriel, appear to have been particularly close during Tunal River and have resulted in the development of Canatlán red list.

Food: Cheese and butter, roast beef Canatlán style, green chili stew of the Mennonite settlements adjacent to New Ideal, making pork carnitas special recipes of the region.

Candy: Caramel watermelon and fibula.

Beverages: Canned watermelon juice.

== Rationalization policy ==
For the election of the Congress of Durang, the state is divided into 15 single-member FPTP districts. The municipality belongs to the District VI Canatlán letterhead and also municipal Canatlán includes the municipalities of Canatlán, San Juan del Río and Comonfort Conet. The number of proportional representation councilors in the municipalities are assigned according to the following pattern: In Canatlán, Cuencamé, Guadalupe Victoria, Mapimí, Name of God, Poanas, Pueblo Nuevo, San Dimas, Santiago Papasquiaro, Tamazula and Tlahualilo, elected new aldermen. The town belongs to Durango's 1st federal electoral district.

== Government ==
The government in Canatlan based on the municipality. Municipal regulations are based on the Constitution of the United Mexican States. The municipality has its headquarters in the City of Canatlán of Apples, is political representation through the Honorable City Mayor composed of 1, 1 Municipal Trustee, 1 Town Clerk and 9 aldermen. Canatlan government system is similar to the United States. For example, like Aldermen have districts.

== Religion ==
Research shows that 88% of Canatlan is Catholic Christian, 8% Jewish, 2% Evangelical, and 1% Jehovah's Witnesses.

== Traditions ==
Notable among them is the watermelon Fair in September each year, Religious Celebration of the Divine Shepherd in the community of La Sauceda, is held the first Friday of March. Conclusion on behalf of the patron saint (San Diego de Alcalá) of the City of Canatlán in November. The legends of Count Suchillos chest, the bench of the municipality and ceramic handicrafts.

== Notable people ==
- Juan Bautista Vargas Arreola (1890–1947)
