= Coat of arms of Durango =

Coat of Arms of Durango

The coat of arms of Durango was adopted in 1658.

== Symbolism ==
It has the following elements: a brown oak tree with abundant foliage in a bright green color; two wolves with a running attitude, on a blue background; two green palm branches as a garland on both sides of the shield, which are linked by their stems with a red bow at the bottom. The shield is inspired by that of the Basque province of Vizcaya, Spain.

All this is framed in a bronze-brown frame. At the top of the shield appears the royal crown in a golden yellow color with blue stones in its vertical arches and diamond-shaped stones at its base, these are embedded and alternate in red and blue, inside the crown there is a bright red lining. Finally, at the top is the crown that represents the king of Spain.

=== Historical coats ===
The symbol is used by all successive regimes in New Viscay, in different forms.

Coat of arms from 1712 to 1979.

== See also ==
- Durango
- Coat of arms of Mexico
