= Ciudad Canatlán =

City in the Mexican state of Durango

- Municipal seat and city
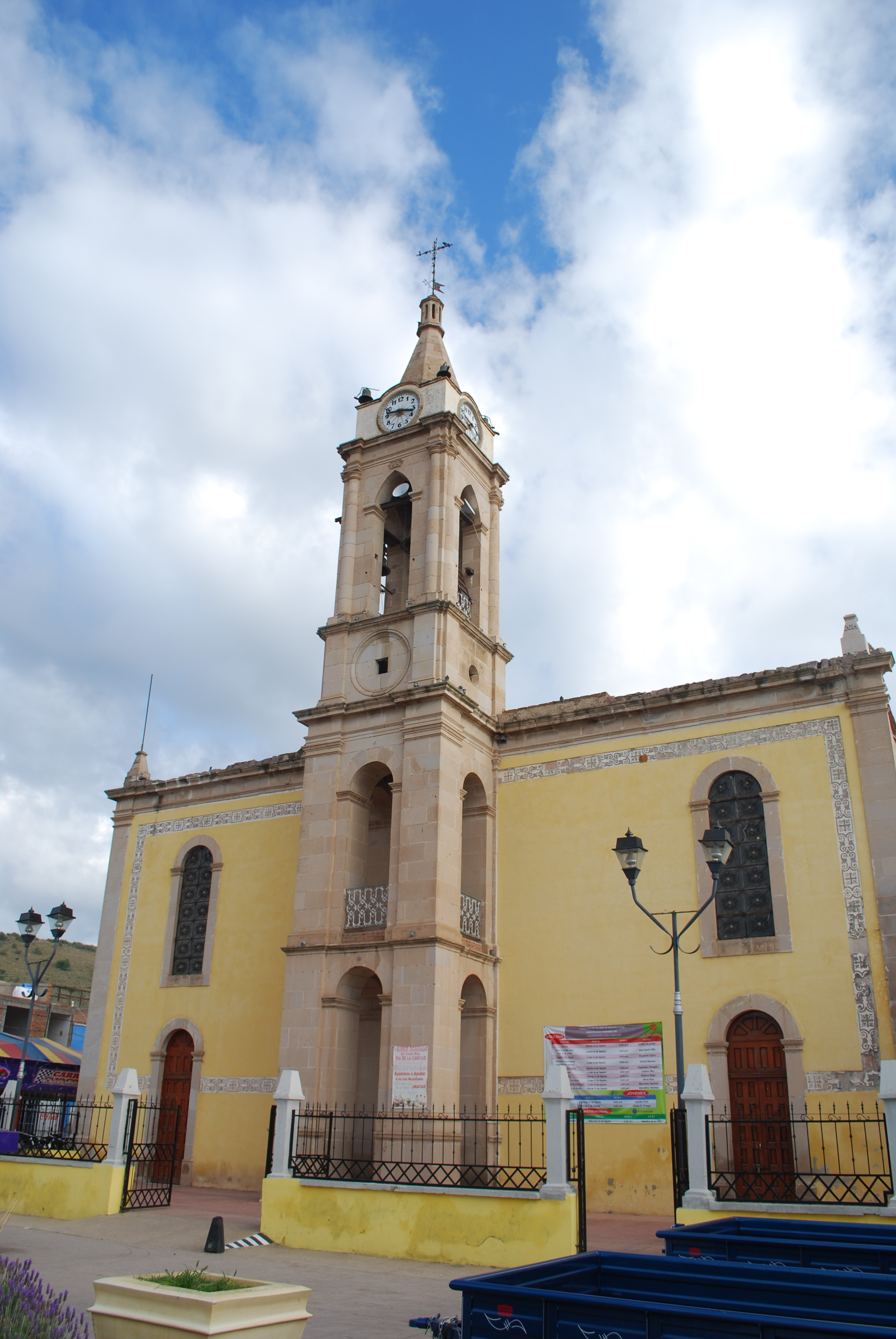
- Iglesia de San Diego de Alcalá

- Location within Durango Location within Mexico
- Coordinates: 24°31′N 104°47′W
- Country: Mexico
- State: Durango
- Municipality: Canatlán
- Elevation: 1,948 m (6,391 ft)

Population (2010)
  - Total: 11,495
- Time zone: UTC-6 (Central)

Ciudad Canatlán is a city and seat of the municipality of Canatlán, in the north-western Mexican state of Durango. As of 2010, the city of Canatlán had a population of 11,495.

== Climate ==
Climate data for Ciudad Canatlán, Durango (1991-2020)
Month	Jan	Feb	Mar	Apr	May	Jun	Jul	Aug	Sep	Oct	Nov	Dec	Year
Record high °C (°F)	35.5 (95.9)	35.0 (95.0)	45.0 (113.0)	37.0 (98.6)	43.0 (109.4)	42.0 (107.6)	39.0 (102.2)	38.0 (100.4)	36.0 (96.8)	36.0 (96.8)	36.0 (96.8)	36.0 (96.8)	45.0 (113.0)
Mean daily maximum °C (°F)	20.3 (68.5)	22.1 (71.8)	24.7 (76.5)	28.0 (82.4)	29.9 (85.8)	29.6 (85.3)	27.2 (81.0)	26.6 (79.9)	25.5 (77.9)	25.1 (77.2)	22.7 (72.9)	20.7 (69.3)	25.2 (77.4)
Daily mean °C (°F)	10.7 (51.3)	12.4 (54.3)	14.6 (58.3)	17.4 (63.3)	19.9 (67.8)	21.2 (70.2)	20.0 (68.0)	19.8 (67.6)	18.8 (65.8)	16.9 (62.4)	13.8 (56.8)	11.2 (52.2)	16.4 (61.5)
Mean daily minimum °C (°F)	1.1 (34.0)	2.8 (37.0)	4.5 (40.1)	6.8 (44.2)	9.8 (49.6)	12.7 (54.9)	12.9 (55.2)	13.0 (55.4)	12.1 (53.8)	8.7 (47.7)	4.8 (40.6)	1.8 (35.2)	7.6 (45.7)
Record low °C (°F)	−10.0 (14.0)	−11.0 (12.2)	−7.0 (19.4)	−6.0 (21.2)	−1.0 (30.2)	3.0 (37.4)	3.0 (37.4)	1.0 (33.8)	−1.0 (30.2)	−4.5 (23.9)	−9.5 (14.9)	−13.0 (8.6)	−13.0 (8.6)
Average precipitation mm (inches)	11.5 (0.45)	6.2 (0.24)	9.0 (0.35)	3.9 (0.15)	13.3 (0.52)	78.5 (3.09)	132.2 (5.20)	123.0 (4.84)	126.6 (4.98)	40.8 (1.61)	16.7 (0.66)	6.2 (0.24)	567.9 (22.36)
Average precipitation days (≥ 0.1 mm)	2.6	1.8	1.5	1.5	3.0	10.9	18.5	17.5	13.0	5.5	2.6	1.9	80.3
Source: Servicio Meteorológico National
