= Mennonites in Mexico =

Ethnic group in Mexico

Mennonites in Mexico Menonitas (in Spanish) Mennoniten (in German)
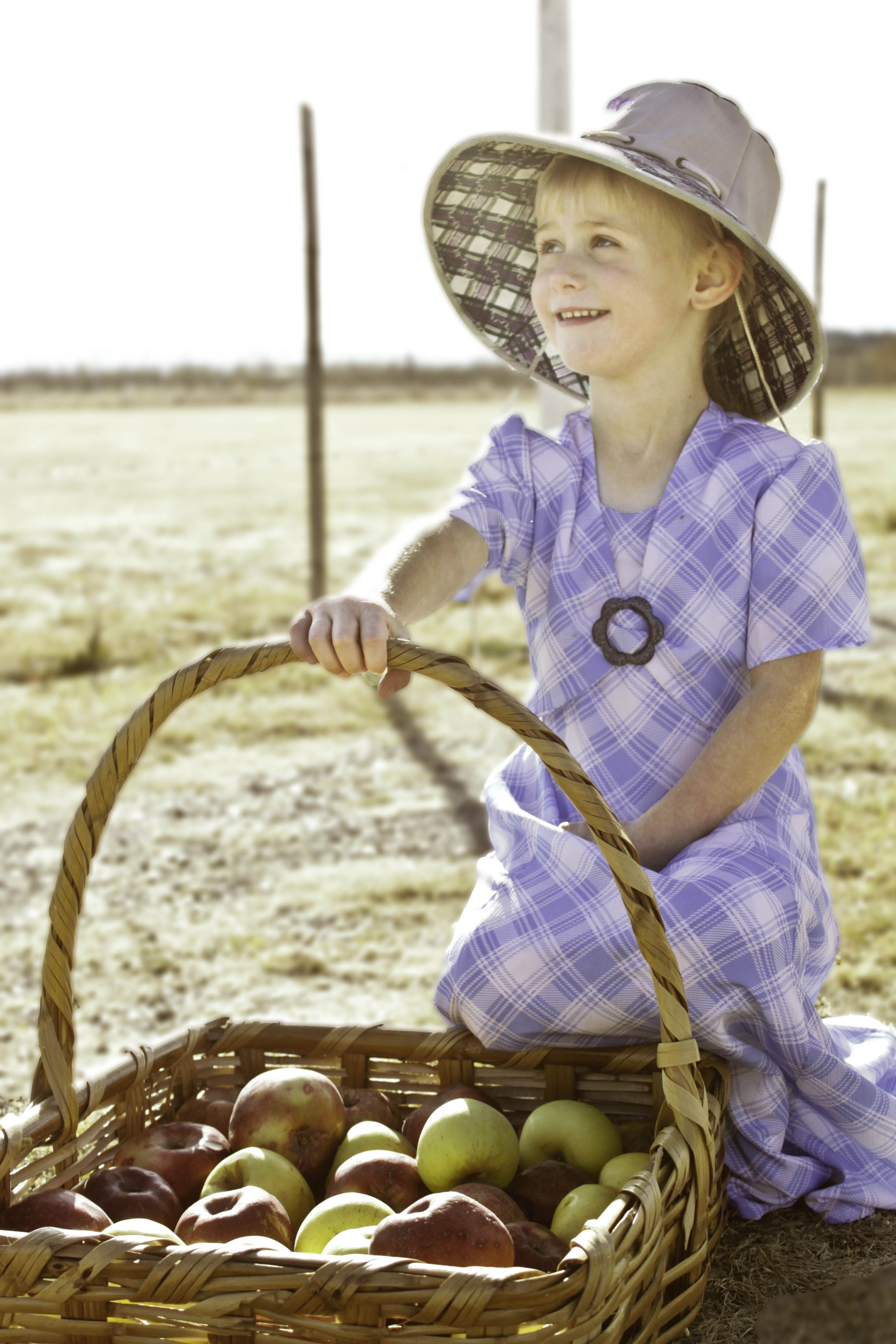
- A Mennonite girl in Cuauhtémoc, Chihuahua

Total population
- 74,122 (2022)

Regions with significant populations
- Chihuahua (municipalities of Cuauhtémoc, Namiquipa, Riva Palacio, etc): Approx. 90,000 (2012)
- Campeche: Approx. 15,000 (2022)
- Durango: Approx. 6,500 (2012)
- Quintana Roo: "a few thousands"

Religions
- Anabaptist

Scriptures
- The Bible

Languages
- Plautdietsch, Standard German, Spanish, English

According to a 2022 census, there were 74,122 Mennonites living in Mexico, the vast majority of which are established in the state of Chihuahua, followed by Campeche at around 15,000, with the rest living in smaller colonies in the states of Durango, Tamaulipas, Zacatecas, San Luis Potosí and Quintana Roo.

Their settlements were first established in the 1920s. In 1922, 3,000 Mennonites from the Canadian province of Manitoba established in Chihuahua. By 1927, Mennonites reached 10,000 and they were established in Chihuahua, Durango and Guanajuato.

Worsening poverty, water shortages and drug-related violence across northern Mexico have provoked significant numbers of Mennonites living in Durango and Chihuahua to relocate abroad in recent years, especially to Canada, and to other regions of the Americas. Between 2012 and 2017 alone, it is estimated that at least 30,000 Mexican Mennonites emigrated to Canada.

== History ==
=== Background ===
The ancestors of the vast majority of Mexican Mennonites settled in the Russian Empire in the late 18th and 19th centuries, coming from the Vistula delta in West Prussia. Even though these Mennonites are Dutch and Prussian by ancestry, language and custom, they are generally called Russian Mennonites, Russland-Mennoniten in German. In the years after 1873, some 7,000 left the Russian Empire and settled in Canada. In the period leading up to and during World War I, governments in the Canadian provinces of Manitoba and Saskatchewan passed laws requiring public schools to fly the Union flag, required compulsory attendance, and created public schools in areas of Mennonite settlement. In response, the more conservative Mennonites sent out delegates to a number of countries to seek out a new land for settlement. They finally settled in a tract of land in Northern Mexico after negotiating certain privileges with Mexican President Álvaro Obregón. Approximately 6,000 of the most conservative Mennonites eventually left Manitoba and Saskatchewan for Mexico. The first train left Plum Coulee, Manitoba, on March 1, 1922.

=== Migration ===
Between 1922 and 1925, some 3,200 members of the Reinlaender Gemeinde in Manitoba and 1,200 from the Swift Current area left Canada to settle in Northern Mexico on approximately 230,000 acres (930 km^{2}) of land in the Bustillos Valley near present-day Cuauhtémoc, Chihuahua. The Manitoba and Swift Current area groups settled the Manitoba and Swift Colonies in Chihuahua, while about 950 Mennonites from the Hague-Osler settlement in Saskatchewan settled on 35,000 acres (140 km^{2}) in Durango near Nuevo Ideal. In 1927 some 7,000 Mennonites from Canada lived in Mexico.

After 1924, another 200 Mennonite families (some 1,000 persons) from Soviet Russia, tried to settle in Mexico. But in the end only 6 out of the 200 families from Russia remained in Mexico. Between 1948 and 1952, some 595 persons of the Kleine Gemeinde in Manitoba bought and settled the Quellenkolonie. They were joined by 246 Old Colony settlers from Manitoba and Saskatchewan, but most of these settlers either soon returned to Canada or left the colony.

=== Settlements ===
The Mennonites established farms, machine shops and motorized vehicles for transporting produce (although automobiles were forbidden for common use). Canadian oats, beans and corn were the main produce. The villages followed Mennonite architectural styles existent in Russia and Canada and the names were based in some cases on former names in Prussia but in most cases from names of villages in Russia and Canada such as Rosenort, Steinbach and Schönwiese. The colonies were based on former Mennonite social structures in terms of education, similar prayer houses and unsalaried ministers. Conservative dress and traditional roles for women were the norm.

== Demography ==
Historical population
Year	Pop.	±%
1922	3,000	—
1927	10,000	+233.3%
2022	74,122	+641.2%
Estimates:

Starting with the first 3,000 Mennonite colonists in 1922, the community's population grew exponentially and in just 100 years it reached 100,000, or a growth of over 3000%. However, as of 2022 the population was found to have decreased to 74,122 due to migration to Colombia, Argentina, the United States, Canada, Paraguay and Bolivia.

== Present ==
In Chihuahua, Mennonites continue their lifestyle with several reforms, such as the use of automobiles. They coexist, learning Spanish, and English, alongside their Plautdietsch language, living side by side with the castizos in the hill country of the state. During the harvest season they employ a considerable number of Tarahumara people from the nearby Copper Canyon area. About 50,000 Mennonites reside near the city of Cuauhtémoc in Chihuahua. In Durango, there are 32 Mennonite communities (30 in Nuevo Ideal Municipality and 2 in Santiago Papasquiaro Municipality).

The number of Mennonites in Durango peaked at 8,000 in 2011 but the current population is about 6,500, most of whom live in Nuevo Ideal. Nuevo Ideal is located about 77 miles (124 km) north of the city of Durango on the Carretera Durango - Guanaceví (Durango - Guanaceví Highway) to Santa Catarina de Tepehuanes. Many travelers and truck drivers stop in Nuevo Ideal in search of queso menonita, a local variety of cheese.

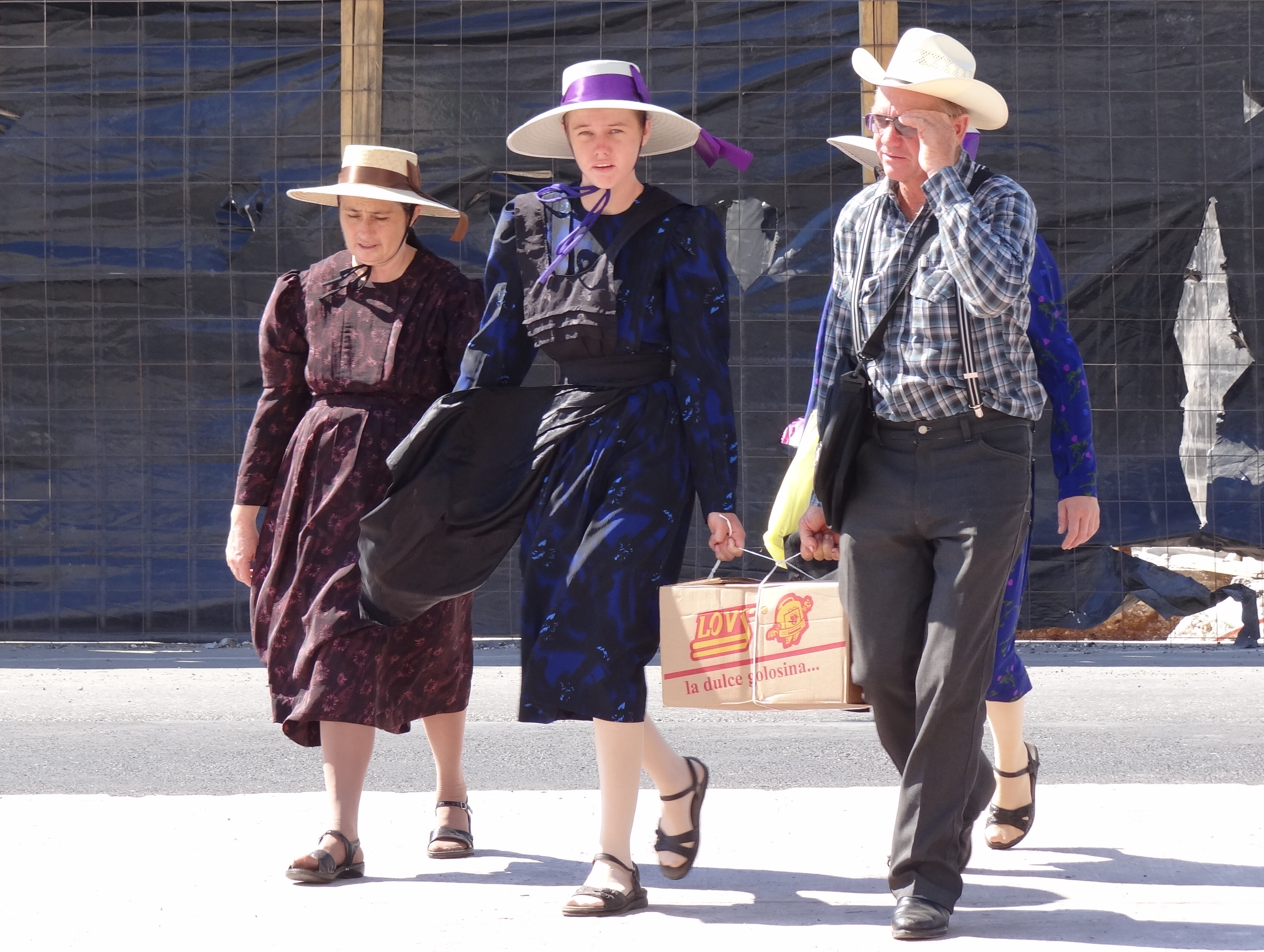
Mennonite family in Campeche.

The largest denomination as of 2006 is the Old Colony Mennonite Church, with 17,200 members. Kleingemeinde in Mexiko has 2,150 members, Sommerfelder Mennonitengemeinde has 2,043 members, Reinländer-Gemeinde has 1,350 members, and the Evangelical Mennonite Mission Conference has 97 members.

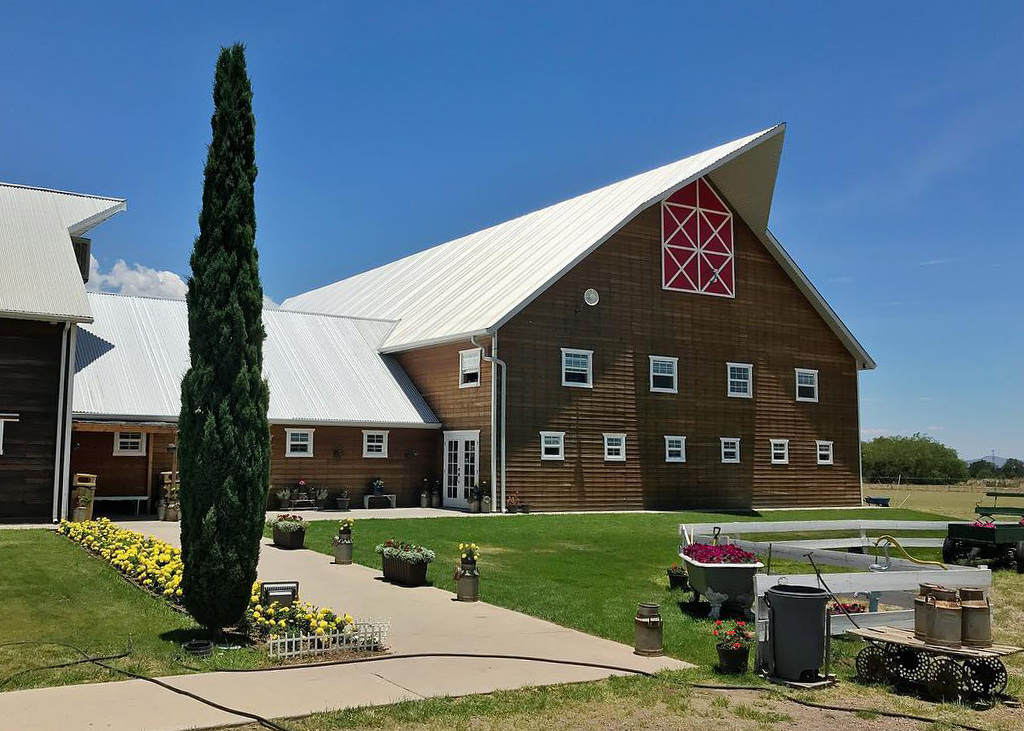
Mennonite Cultural Center and Museum in Cuauhtémoc, Chihuahua.

The community of Chihuahua is divided into "conservative" and "liberal" factions, with the liberal faction accounting for 20% of the population. This group is more open to outsiders and more likely to marry outside of the community than their conservative peers. It is also more common for this group to adopt Tarahumara and Mestizo children. These children grow up as any other Mennonite would, learning German in school and helping out in the community.

A number of other congregations of Conservative Mennonites have been established throughout Mexico including La Esperanza and Pedernales in Chihuahua, La Honda, Zacatecas, and more recently Oaxaca.

== Impact of drugs ==
Since the start of the Mexican drug war, many Mennonite communities in Chihuahua have been impacted by drug-related violence due to the location and economic success of their colonies. The economic achievements have attracted the attention of organized criminal gangs, putting Mennonites at risk of armed robbery, kidnapping, and extortion. These factors have led Mennonites from northern Mexico to emigrate to more secure Mexican states, like Campeche. Some have returned to Canada or moved to other Latin American countries like Belize, Paraguay, Argentina, and Bolivia.

Some Mennonites were convicted of drug running in the 1990s. Accusations of drug involvement continued into the 21st century. In 2014, Abraham Friesen-Remple was one of six members of the Northern Mexico's Mennonite community who were indicted and accused of smuggling marijuana in the gas tanks of cars and inside farm equipment.

== Other challenges ==
In addition to escalating drug-related violence and worsening poverty in Mexico, Mennonites living in Chihuahua and Durango have had to contend with extended periods of droughts as well as tensions with non-Mennonite farmers over access to water. The combination of these factors has provoked significant numbers of Mennonites in the region to emigrate abroad, especially to Canada and South America, in recent years. From 2012 to 2017 alone, it is estimated that 30,000 Mexican Mennonites relocated to Canada. A 2020 survey found that there are more than 200 Mennonite colonies in nine Latin American countries, with 66 in Mexico.

In 2007, the Mennonite colony of Salamanca in the state of Quintana Roo was completely destroyed due to the landfall of Hurricane Dean. The settlement previously had a population of 800 spread over 4,900 acres (2,000 ha). As of 2008, Salamanca had a population of 862.

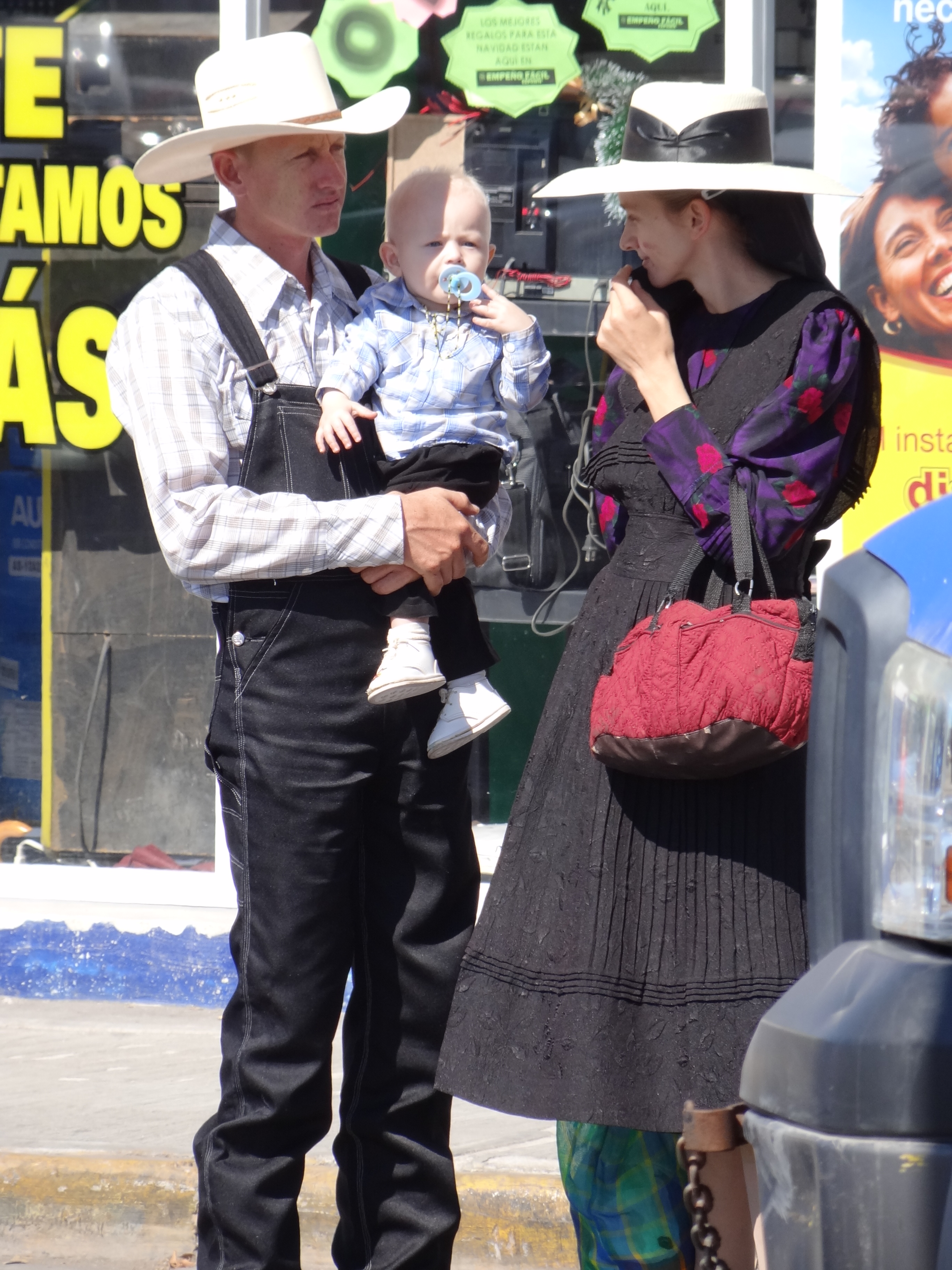
Mennonite family from Campeche.

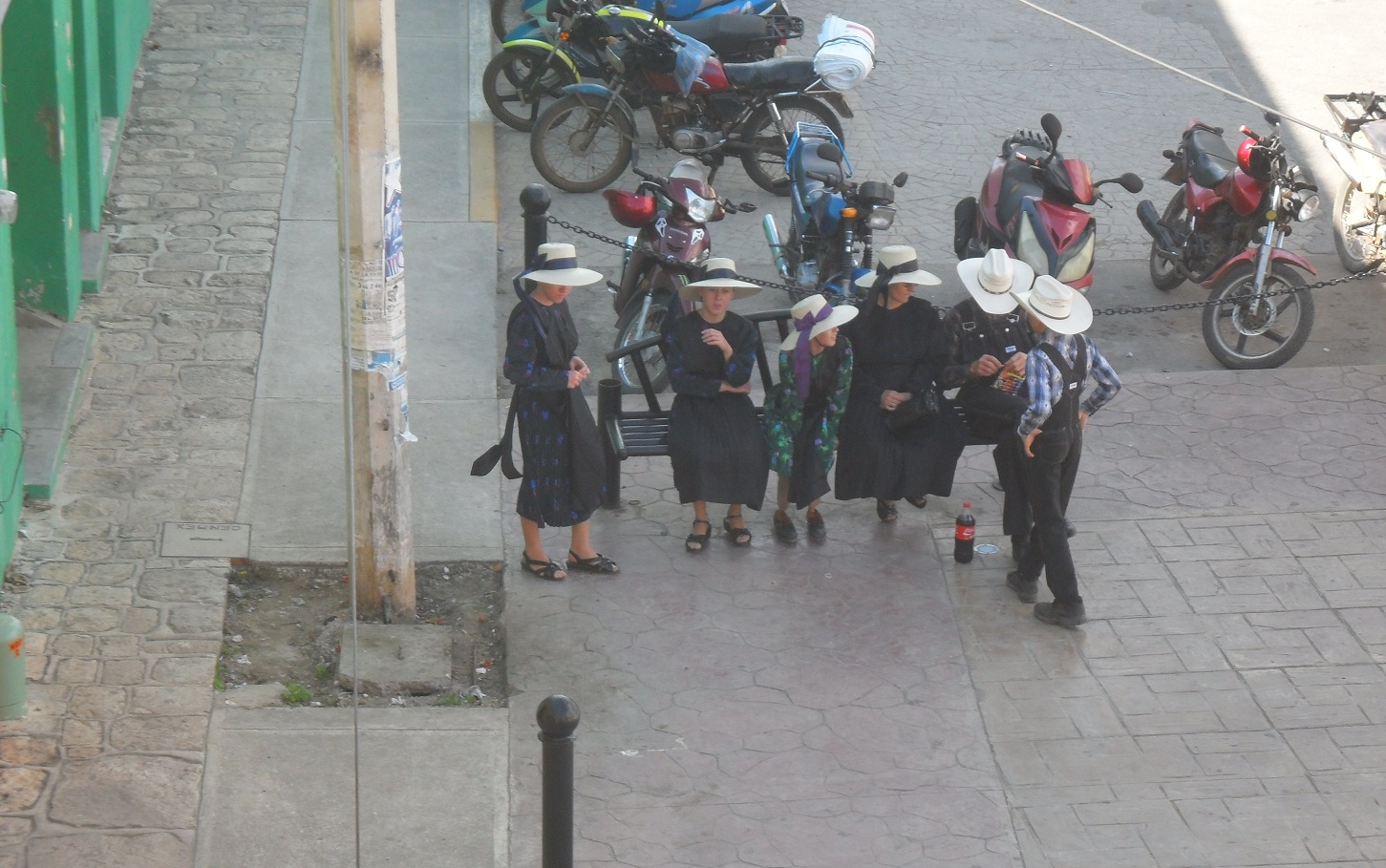
Mennonites in Hopelchén, Campeche.

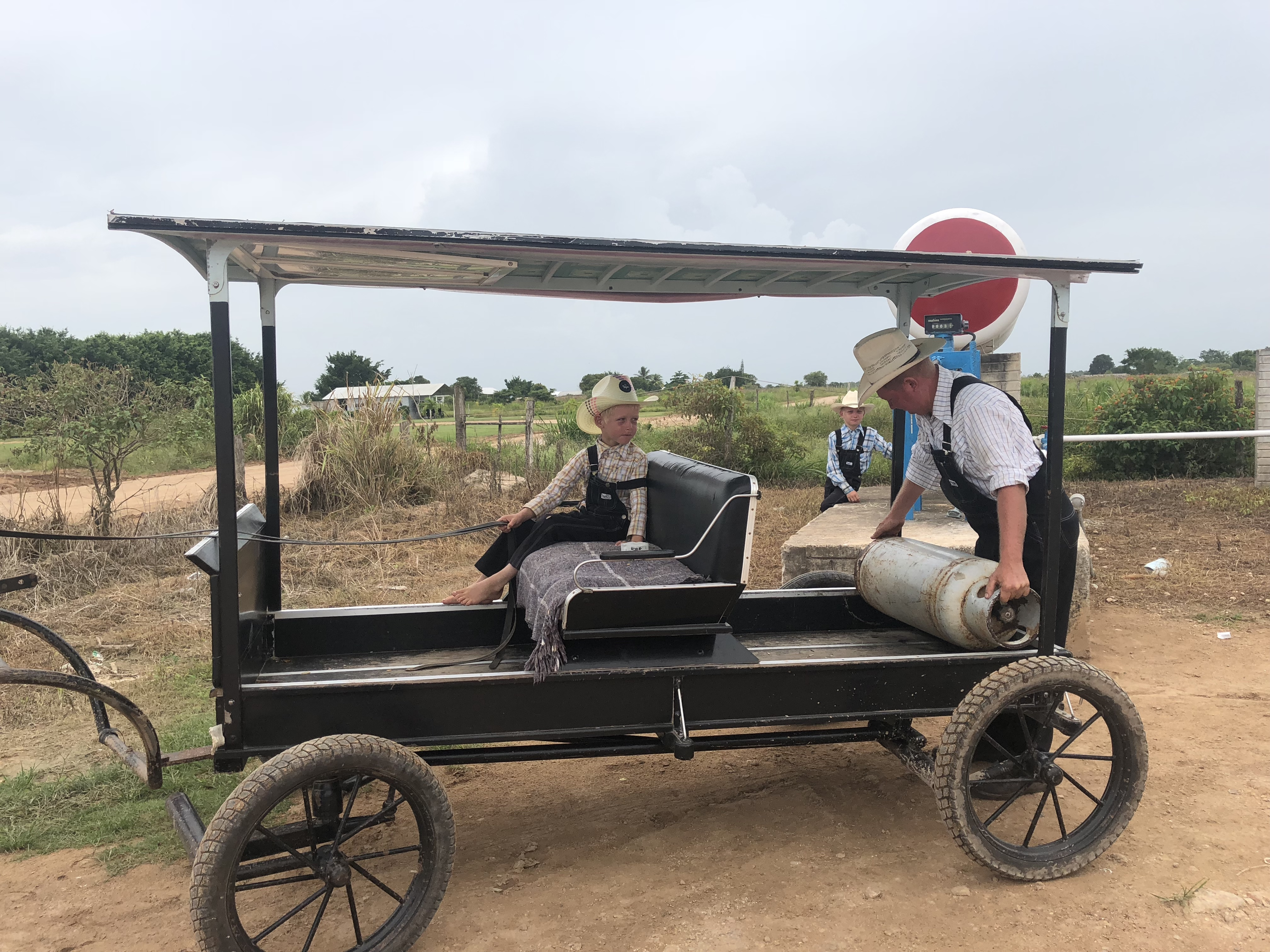
Mennonites from Bacalar, Quintana Roo.

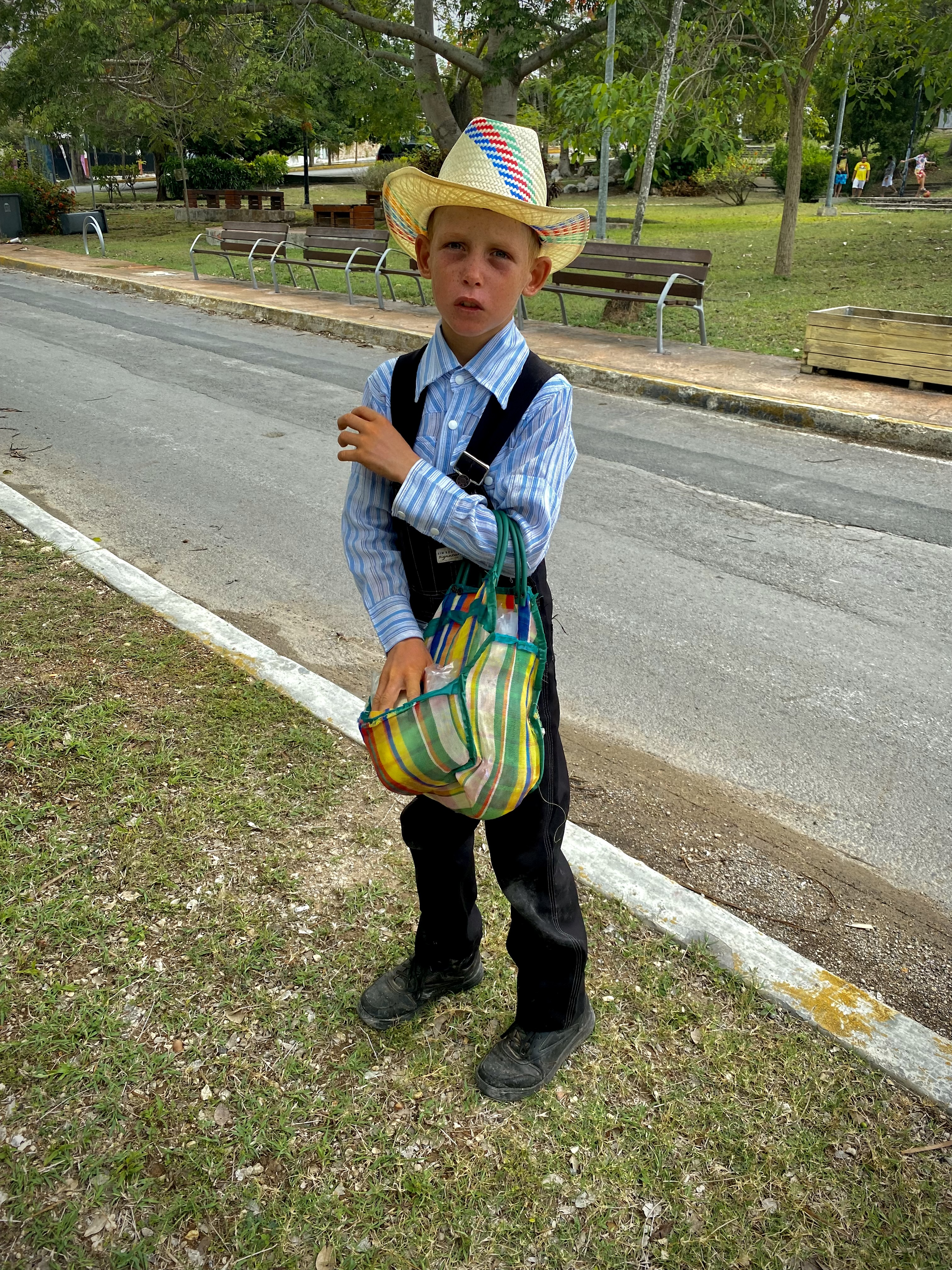
Mennonite peddler boy selling bread in Bacalar, Quintana Roo.

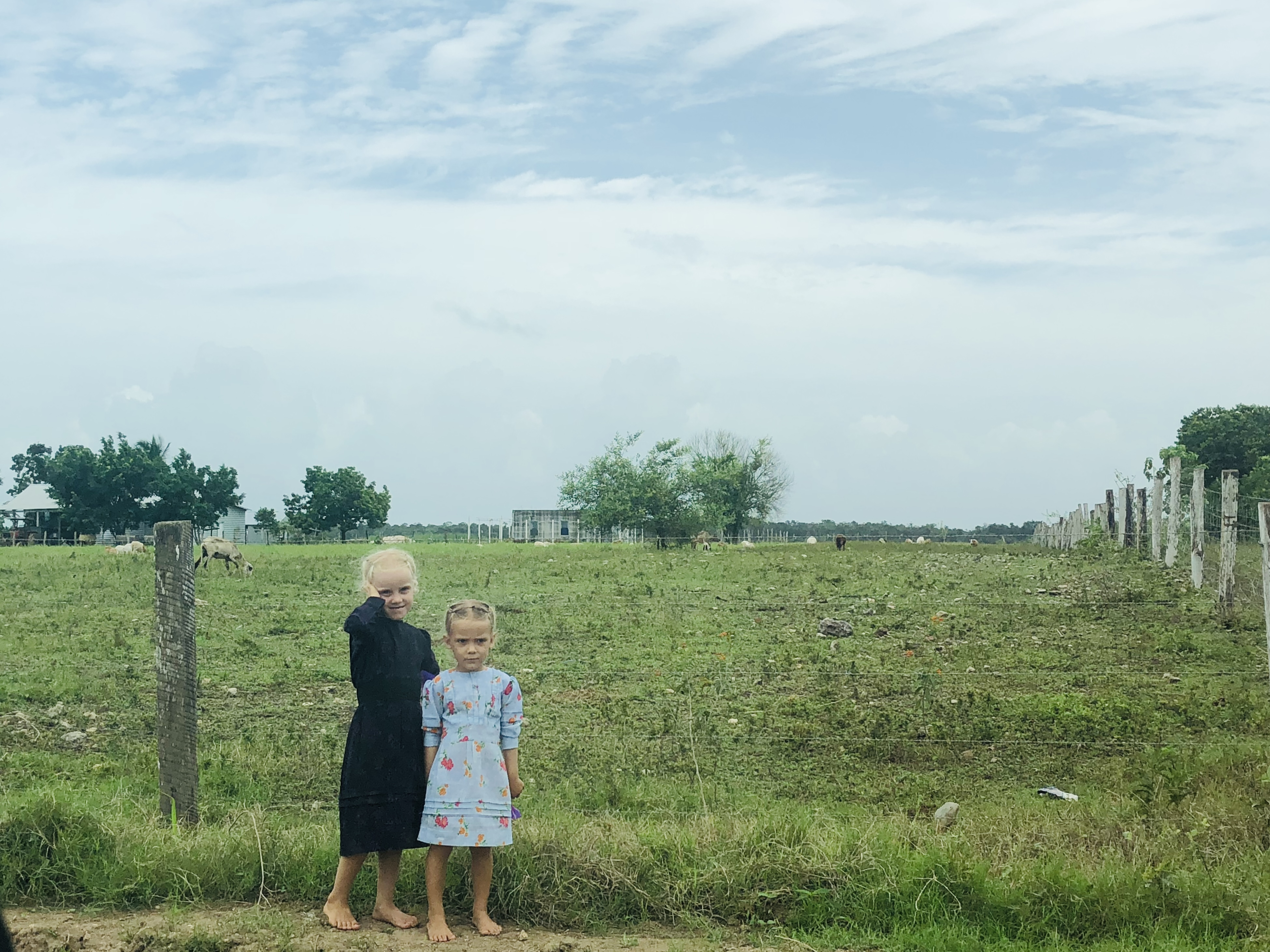
Mennonite children from Bacalar, Quintana Roo.

== Film ==
The Mexican Mennonite community was the setting for the 2007 film Stellet Licht by acclaimed Mexican director Carlos Reygadas.

== See also ==
- Queso Chihuahua
- Mormon colonies in Mexico

== Literature ==
- Harry Leonard Sawatzky: They Sought a Country: Mennonite Colonization in Mexico, Berkeley, CA et al. 1971.
- Harry Leonard Sawatzky: Sie suchten eine Heimat : deutsch-mennonitische Kolonisierung in Mexiko, 1922 - 1984, Marburg 1986. (Not just a translation of the English book, but a distinct publication)
- Walter Schmiedehaus: Die Altkolonier-Mennoniten in Mexiko, Winnipeg 1982
