= Mexicana Universal Durango =

- Formation: 1994 (as Nuestra Belleza Durango); 2017 (as Mexicana Universal Durango)
- Type: Beauty Pageant
- Headquarters: Durango
- Location: Mexico
- Local Coordinator: Alonso Torrecillas

Mexicana Universal Durango (until 2016 called Nuestra Belleza Baja Durango) is a state-level contest in the state of Durango, Mexico, which selects the state representative for the national contest Mexicana Universal (formerly called Nuestra Belleza México), thus aspiring to represent the country internationally on one of the platforms offered.

The state organization has achieved the following results since 1994:

- 2nd Runner-up: 1 (2003)
- Top 15/16: 4 (1996, 1997, 2011, 2013)
- Top 20: 2 (2004, 2005)
- Unplaced: 19 (1994, 1995, 1998, 1999, 2001, 2002, 2006, 2007, 2008, 2009, 2010, 2012, 2014, 2015, 2016, 2017, 2018, 2022, 2025)
- Absences: 4 (2000, 2019, 2021, 2023)

== Titleholders ==
The following are the names of the annual winners of Mexicana Universal Baja California, listed in ascending order, as well as their results during the national Mexicana Universal pageant. State queens who represented the country in a current or past franchise of the national organization are also highlighted in a specific color.

Current Franchises:

- Competed at Miss Grand International.
- Competed at Miss International.
- Competed at Miss Charm.
- Competed at Reina Hispanoamericana.
- Competed at Miss Orb International.
- Competed at Nuestra Latinoamericana Universal.

Former Franchises:

- Competed at Miss Universe.
- Competed at Miss World.
- Competed at Miss Continente Americano.
- Competed at Miss Costa Maya International.
- Competed at Miss Atlántico Internacional.
- Competed at Miss Verano Viña del Mar.
- Competed at Reina Internacional del Café.
- Competed at Reina Internacional de las Flores.
- Competed at Señorita Continente Americano.
- Competed at Nuestra Belleza Internacional.

Year	Titleholder	Hometown	Placement	Special Award	Notes
2025	Gabriela Alejandra Zurita Montenegro	Nuevo Ideal	-	-	Reina de la Feria Regional Nuevo Ideal 2023
2024	In 2024, due to changes in the dates of the national pageant, the election of the state queens was postponed for one year.				
2023	Andrea Berenice Núñez Muñoz (Resigned)	Durango	Did not Compete	-	Reina del 453 Aniversario de la Ciudad de Durango 2016; Reina de la Feria Nacional Durango 2016; Reina del Festival Internacional del Mariachi, Charrería y Danza 2015
2023	Paola Rivas Barrera (Assumed); Withdrew from the national competition due to the postponement of the national pageant.	Guadalupe Victoria	Did not Compete	-	1st Runner-up at Mexicana Universal Durango 2023; Competed at Señorita Perla del Guadiana 2018
2022	Paulina Ileana Flores Rodelo (Resigned)	Durango	Did not Compete	-	-
2022	Briseida Ayala López (Assumed)	Guanaceví	-	-	1st Runner-up ast Mexicana Universal Durango 2022; Top Model of the Universe México 2022; Best Model of the World México 2019
2021	Paola Samantha Torres Hurtado (Resigned)	Santiago Papasquiaro	Did not Compete	-	-
2020	In 2020, due to the contingency of COVID-19 there was a lag in the year of the state contest				
2019	Paulina Herrera Fallad	Durango	Did not Compete	-	Competed at Miss F1 México 2015; Top 15 at Nuestra Belleza México 2013; Nuestra Belleza Durango 2013
2018	Wendolin Esmeralda Chávez Martínez	Santiago Papasquiaro	-	-	Embajadora at Señorita Perla del Guadiana 2017
2017	Idaly Ayala Anaya	Guanaceví	-	-	-
Until 2016 the Title was Nuestra Belleza Durango
2016	Iraís Alexandra Maldonado Gallardo	Nazas	-	-	Señorita Perla del Guadiana 2016; Señorita Juventud 2013
2015	Viveck Nevárez Marín	Nuevo Ideal	-	-	-
2014	Gisela Yeraldi Barraza Barraza	Santa María del Oro	-	-	Face of Beauty International 2015; Face of Beauty México 2015; Princesa de la Feria Nacional de Durango 2011
2013	Paulina Herrera Fallad	Durango	Top 15	-	Mexicana Universal Durango 2019; Competed at Miss F1 México 2015
2012	Ana Victoria Alexandra Sánchez Soto	Durango	-	-	-
2011	Mónica Ivette Ayala Venegas	Durango	Top 15	Academic Award; Best National Costume	-
2010	Vanessa Crispín Herrera	Gómez Palacio	-	-	-
2009	Marcela Máynez Núñez	Gómez Palacio	-	-	-
2008	Margarita Favela Fragoso	Santiago Papasquiaro	-	-	-
2007	Dulce María Esparza Chaidez	Durango	-	-	-
2006	Dulce María Félix Piña	Durango	-	-	-
2005	Arlene Nevárez Ortega	Durango	Top 20	-	-
2004	Vanessa Zaldívar Pérez Arellano	Durango	Top 20	-	-
2003	Jiapsi Paola Bojórquez Martínez	Durango	2nd Runner-up	-	Was born in Sonora
2002	Mayra Carrasco Alarcón	Santiago Papasquiaro	-	-	-
2001	Jennifer López Rateike	Durango	-	-	-
2000	No candidate was sent				
1999	Verónica Selene Garza Gamero	Durango	-	-	-
1998	Alejandra Fernández de Castro Sosa	Durango	-	-	-
1997	Karla Pescador de la Peña	Durango	Top 16	-	-
1996	Brenda Elena Alcantar Diaz	Durango	Top 16	-	-
1995	Esther Ileana Arreola López	Durango	-	-	-
1994	María Guadalupe Favela Ante	Cuencamé	-	-	-

== Designated Contestants ==
Starting in 2000, states were allowed to have more than one candidate, as some states were not sending candidates for various reasons. The following contestants from Durango were invited to compete in the national pageant alongside the reigning queen, and in some cases, they achieved even better results.

Year	Titleholder	Hometown	Placement	Special Award	Notes
2008	Patricia Castañeda González	Durango	-	-	1st Runner-up at Nuestra Belleza Durango 2008
2003	Karla María Ayala Ortíz	Durango	-	-	1st Runner-up at Nuestra Belleza Durango 2003

== See also ==
- Miss Durango
