= Nuestra Belleza Durango 2011 =

- Date: June 9, 2011
- Venue: Teatro Ricardo Castro, Durango, Durango.
- Broadcaster: Televisa
- Entrants: 8
- Placements: 3
- Winner: Mónica Ayala; Durango City

Nuestra Belleza Durango 2011, was held in the 2,200-seat Teatro Ricardo Castro opera house in Durango, Durango on June 9, 2011. At the conclusion of the final night of competition, Mónica I. Ayala Venegas of Durango City was crowned the winner. Ayala was crowned by outgoing Nuestra Belleza Durango titleholder, Vanessa Crispín. Eight contestants competed for the title.

== Results ==
=== Placements ===
Final results	Contestant
Nuestra Belleza Durango 2011	Mónica I. Ayala Venegas
Suplente / 1st Runner-up	Cinthia Garza
2nd Runner-up	Alejandra Gómez
3rd Runner-up	Rubi Amaya

=== Special awards ===
Award	Contestant
Miss Photogenic	Anahí Hernández
Miss Congeniality	Cynthia Garza
Miss Elegance	Yamilet Sariñana

== Judges ==
- Carmen Saláis - Fashion Business
- María Eleneca Castaños - Director of International Affairs of the State
- Sonia García Calderón - Businesswoman
- Bella Vieira - Event Producer Televisa México
- Mario Sánchez Patiño - Director of Corporate Image Design
- Yima Medrano - Photographer
- Mariano Herrera - Representative of Magazine Soy Norte
- Patricia Brogeras - Regional Coordinator of Nuestra Belleza México

== Contestants ==
Contestant	Age	Height	Hometown
Alejandra Gómez	20	1.76	Durango
Anahí Hernández	21	1.71	Durango
Cynthia Garza	21	1.74	Durango
Fernanda Galván	20	1.75	Vicente Guerrero
Mónica Ayala	22	1.73	Durango
Rubí Amaya Beyer	21	1.72	Durango
Selma Pereda	20	1.70	Gomez Palacio
Yamilet Sariñana	19	1.70	Durango
