= Miss Durango =

State-level contest in Durango, Mexico

- Formation: 2016
- Type: Beauty Pageant
- Headquarters: Durango
- Location: Mexico
- Local Coordinator: Oscar Miranda

Miss Durango is a state-level contest in the state of Durango, Mexico, which selects the state representative for the national contest Miss México, thus aspiring to represent the country internationally on one of the platforms offered.

The state organization has achieved the following results since 2016:

- Top 10/11: 2 (2016, 2025)
- Unplaced: 5 (2017, 2018, 2019, 2021, 2023)

== National Queens ==
- Giselle Núñez - Miss México Global City 2018 (Designated)

== International Queens ==
- Giselle Núñez - Miss Global City 2018

== Titleholders ==
The following are the names of the annual winners of Miss Durango, listed in ascending order, as well as their results during the national Miss México pageant. State queens who represented the country in a current or past franchise of the national organization are also highlighted in a specific color.

Current Franchises:

- Competed at Miss World.
- Competed at Miss Supranational.
- Competed at Miss Cosmo.
- Competed at Miss Elite.
- Competed at Top Model of the World.
- Competed at Reina Internacional del Café.
- Competed at Reina Mundial del Banano.
- Competed at Miss Continentes Unidos.
- Competed at Miss Global City.

Former Franchises:

- Competed at Miss Grand International.
- Competed at Miss Costa Maya International.

Year	Titleholder	Hometown	Placement	Special Award	Notes
2026	Lizbeth Silerio	Durango	TBD		
2025	Erika Rodallegas	Durango	Top 11	-	1st Runner-up at Miss México Cosmo 2025; Señorita Instituto Tecnológico de Durango 2023
2024	Due to changes in the dates of the national pageant, the election of the state queens was postponed for this year.				
2023	Joselyn Macías Hernández	Gómez Palacio	-	-	Top 3 at Miss México Top Model of the World 2024
2022	Due to changes in the dates of the national pageant, the election of the state queens was postponed for this year.				
2021	Valeria Antuna Cuevas	Durango	-	-	Competed at Miss Universe México 2025; Miss Universe Durango 2025; Miss Playa Mundial México 2019; Miss Playa Mundial Durango 2019; Competed at Miss Beauty México 2018; Miss Beauty Durango 2018
2020	Due to the contingency of COVID-19 there was a lag in the year of the state contest				
2019	Carolina Nicolle Thomas Echeverría (Resigned)	Durango	Did not Compete	-	-
2019	Verónica Jeannett Cervantes Zolorio (Assumed)	Buenavista	-	-	Top 10 at Miss México Supranational 2025; Competed at Miss México 2024; 2nd Runner-up at Miss Michoacán 2023; Competed at Miss Michoacán 2018; Competed at Miss Teen Michoacán 2016; Ana Karen Cervantes' sister, Miss Universe Ciudad de México 2025; Was born and raised in Michoacán
2018	María Elena Matuk Plantillas	Durango	-	-	Top 16 at Miss México Elite 2022; Miss Universidad del Valle de México 2018
2017	Giselle Núñez Ochoa	Santiago Papasquiaro	-	-	Miss Global City 2018; Miss México Global City 2018; Competed at Miss Tourism Queen of the Year International 2015; Miss Tourism Queen of the Year México 2015; Competed at Best Model of the World 2013; Best Model of México 2013
2016	María Elena Bechelani Ánima	Durango	Top 10	-	Top 15 at Miss México Grand 2017; Competed at Nuestra Belleza Durango 2013

== See also ==
- Mexicana Universal Durango
