= Santiago Papasquiaro Municipality =

Municipality in the Mexican state of Durango

Santiago Papasquiaro
- Municipality
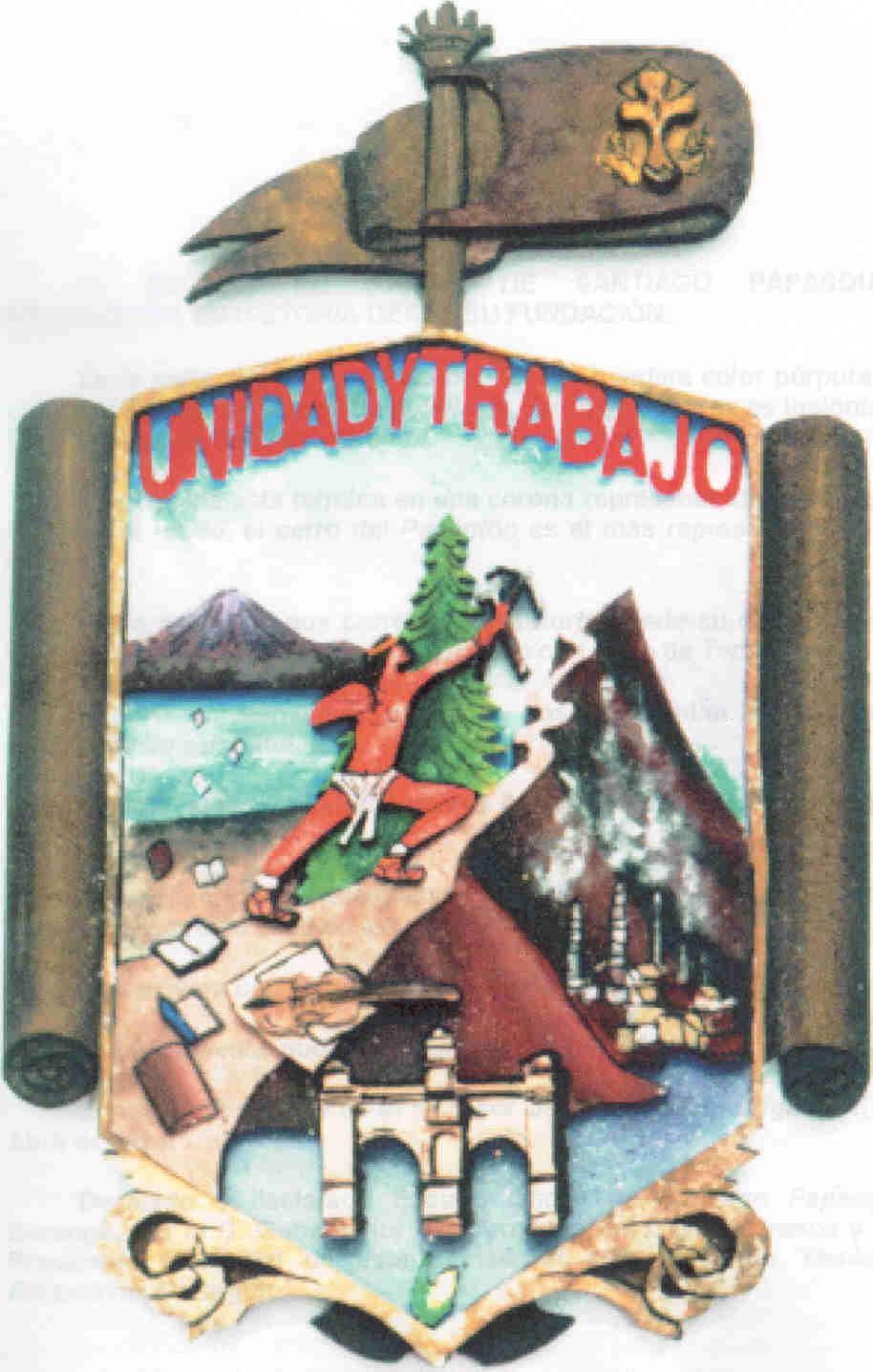
- Coat of arms

- Municipality of Santiago Papasquiaro in Durango

- Location within Mexico Location within Durango
- Coordinates: 25°03′N 105°29′W
- Country: Mexico
- State: Durango
- Municipal seat: Santiago Papasquiaro

Area
  - Total: 7,238.4 km^{2} (2,794.8 sq mi)
- Elevation: 1,730 m (5,680 ft)

Population (2020)
  - Total: 49,207
  - Density: 6.7980/km^{2} (17.607/sq mi)
- Time zone: UTC-6 (Central)
- Website: https://santiagopapasquiaro.gob.mx/

Santiago Papasquiaro is a municipality in the Mexican state of Durango. The municipal seat lies in Santiago Papasquiaro. The municipality covers an area of 7,238.4 km^{2}. Santiago Papasquiaro municipality is at an average height of 1,730 m (5,675 ft) above the sea level. The municipality lies east of the Sierra Madre Occidental Mountain Range. It neighbors the municipalities of Canelas and Tepehuanes to the north, San Dimas and Otáez to the south, Nuevo Ideal to the east, Tamazula to the west and El Oro to the northeast.

As of 2020, the municipality had a total population of 49,207, up from 41,539 as of 2005.

As of 2020, the city of Santiago Papasquiaro had a population of 30,063. Other than the city of Santiago Papasquiaro, the municipality had 416 localities, the largest of which (with 2010 populations in parentheses) were: Ciénega de Nuestra Señora de Guadalupe (2,532), and José María Morelos (Chinacates) (1,521), classified as rural.

== History ==
The municipality of Santiago Papasquiaro is located in the mountainous region of the Sierra Madre Occidental Mountain Range in northern Mexico. Its location was used by Spanish conquistadores as a camp ground to locate native tribes, notably the Tepehuanos. The topography also helped Tepehuanos to defend their territory from the nearby Tarahumara and Chichimecan people.

La Sauceda settlement was built with the natives from El Valle de Anáhuac Valley, separating the Tepehuano territory and El Valle del Guadiana Valley, the capital of Nueva Vizcaya province. The mission was founded in 1597, making Santiago Papasquiaro the center of the activities in all the Tepehuano territory.

On November 18, 1616, Santiago Papasquiaro's Spanish population and its church were attacked by the natives. Caciques led the attacks, one of them was Quitlatas. The result of the assault was in priests Bernardo Cisneros and Diego de Orozco deaths.

In 1620, a mission was established in the same place, even when the natives used to strike them still. It was until 1690 that the town was officially established. In the 18th century, the municipality was astounded by three droughts. After the recovery in 1787, the town was titled as a Village.

After the Independence War, Santiago Papasaquiaro was recognized as the party capital, which lasted until the disappearance of the organization system in 1917.

During the Independence War, the municipality's party created a well-organized group that made havocs against the troops of the Presidios. This group was commanded by Santiago Baca Ortiz, from the same capital.

== Localities ==
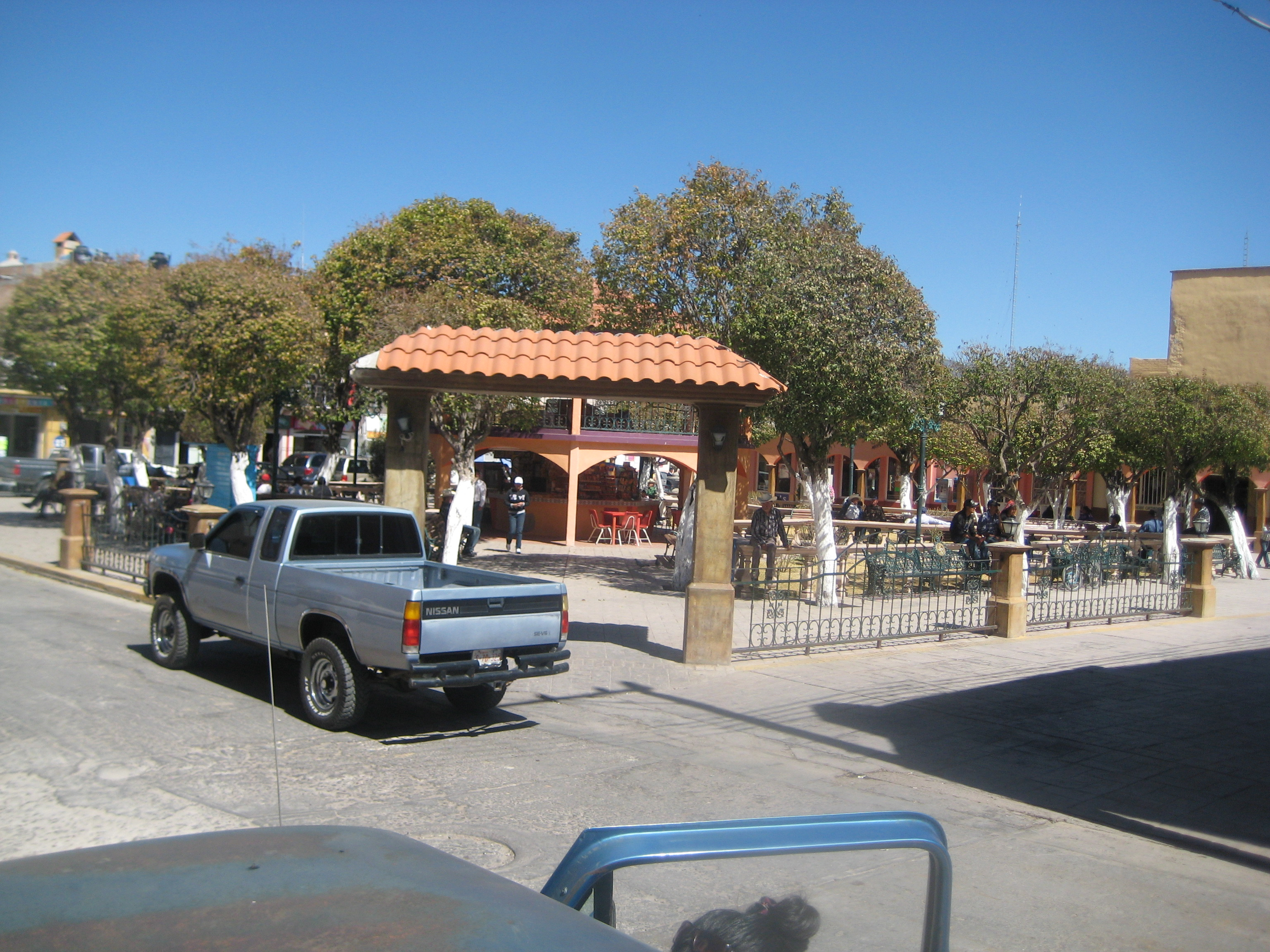
Central Plaza in Tepehuanes, Durango. February 2011

The townships, cities and ejidos in Santiago Papasquiaro municipality are:

- Acatita
- Adulfo Virrey
- Alamillos
- Aranas
- Arroyo de las Iglesias
- Arroyo Grande
- Arroyo Los Toros
- Aserradero Giselle
- Aserradero Los Chaidez
- Aserradero Porfirio Corral Chaidez
- Atotonilco, Bacatame
- Bajío de San Cristóbal
- Bajíos del Pinto
- Boldoquines
- Barrancos Blancos
- Barrazas
- Boca del Potrero
- Campo Alvarado
- Canatán
- Canoas
- Carricitos
- Centro Distrital de Reinsersión Social
- Cerro Dorado
- Cerro Nevado
- Carco Verde
- Ciénega de Guadalupe
- Ciénegade Nuestra Señora de Guadalupe
- Ciénega de Salpica el Agua
- Club Los Sauces
- Cordón del Tabaco
- Corrales Blancos
- Coyotillos
- Cuatro Hermanos
- Cuevecillas
- Diez de Abril
- El Agua Caliente
- El Aguaje
- El Aguajito
- El Alamito
- El Alazán
- El Ancón
- El Arco
- El Atascadero
- El Aventadero
- El Álamo
- El Bajío
- El Barreal
- El Boletero
- El Cazadero
- El Cáñamo
- El Cerrito
- El Chicural
- El Colorado
- El Comedero
- El Conejo
- El Correo
- El Crucero
- El Duraznito
- El Durazno
- El Encinal
- El Entroque
- El Guamúchil
- El Llano de Guayabal
- El Lucero
- El Manzano
- El Naranjito
- El Nogalito (Los Rodolfos)
- El Olvido
- El Palomar
- El Papalote
- El Patio de Altares
- El Púlpito
- El Peñasco
- El Pino
- El Polvorín
- El Porvenir
- El Puertecito
- El Ranchito
- El Rayito
- El Refugio
- El Rincón
- El Salitre
- El Salvador
- El Serrucho
- El Tambor
- El Terminal
- El Terrero
- El Torreón
- El Torreoncito
- El Trece
- El Venado
- Francisco Javier Leyva
- Francisco Ramírez
- Galindos
- Garame de Abajo
- Garame de Arriba
- Gelacio Lechuga
- Granja los Fresnitos
- Gregorio Bueno
- Grupo Industrial Bosque
- Guadalupe Guerrero
- Gustavo Gándara, Hervideros
- Hotel Puerto del Sol
- Jesús Guajardo, Jicatita
- José Cruz Esparza
- José Manuel Rivera Carrasco
- José María Morelos (Chinacates)
- José Ramón Valdez
- José Salomé Acosta (El Olote)
- Joya de Golondrinas
- Joya de la Soledad
- Joya de Laureles
- Joya de Montoros
- Juan Ángel
- La Alameda
- La Batea
- La Bolsa
- La Caña
- La Cañada de San Miguel
- La China
- La Chita
- La Ciénega de Aguapiole
- La Ciénega de Camarena
- La Ciénega de San José
- La Ciénega del Correo
- La Cuchilla, La Cueva
- La Enramada de Abajo
- La Enramada de Enmedio
- La Estancia, La Garameña
- La Herradura
- La Huerta
- La Joya
- La Joya de los Laureles
- La Joya del Tapanco
- La Joyita
- La Lagunita
- La Lajita
- La Loma
- La Madre Juana
- La Mesa de Potrerillos
- La Mocha
- La Palestina
- La Peña
- La Quebrada de Durango
- La Rinconada
- La Sidra
- La Sierrita
- La Soledad
- La Trementina
- La Trinidad, La Tuna
- La Ulama
- La Villita
- La Yerbabuena
- Laguna de la Chaparra (Ranas)
- Las Cieneguitas
- Las Cruces
- Las Flores
- Las Gaviotas
- Las Güeritas
- Las Margaritas
- Las Mesitas
- Las Palmas
- Las Papas (Rancho Nuevo)
- Las Tapias
- Las Taunitas
- Las Trochileras
- Lienzo Charo
- Llano Prieto
- Los Adobes
- Los Alamitos
- Los Algodones
- Los Alisos
- Los Altares
- Los Charcos
- Los Herrera
- Los Ojitos (El Yaqui)
- Los Pascuales
- Los Sauces
- Lozano Zavala (La Campana)
- Luna González
- Machado
- Maderas y Dimensionados
- Chavil
- Maderas y Productos
- Forestales de Santiago
- Madroño
- Manila
- Manzanillas
- Martínez de Abajo
- Martínez de Arriba
- Melchor Ocampo
- Meleros
- Mesa del Venado
- Mesteñas
- Metates
- Mimbrs
- Montoros
- Nuevo San Diego (El Caballo)
- Palos Colorados
- Panales
- Piedra Bola
- Piedra de Amolar
- Piedras de Amolar
- Potrerillos
- Potrero de los Indios
- Presa de la Máquina
- Providencia
- Puerto de Temascales
- Punta del Agua
- Ranchito de Juan Ángel (La Hielera)
- Ranchito de Saucedo
- Rancho de Balcones
- Rancho de Miguel
- Rancho el 33
- Rancho Golondrinas
- Rancho la Tijera
- Rancho Lomas del Río
- Rancho los Nogales
- Rancho Lulú
- Rancho Nuevo
- Rancho San Antonio
- Rancho Santa Elena
- Rancho Viejo
- Real de San Diego
- Rincón de Huajupa
- Rincón de Nevárez
- Rincón de Temascales
- Salsipuedes (Mesa del Corral)
- San Agustín del Fresno (El Hizapote)
- San Antonio
- San Antonio de la Sierra
- San Antonio de Nevárez
- San Bartolo
- San Diego de Tenzaenz
- San Francisco
- San Gregorio de Bosos
- San Ignacio
- San Isidro
- San Javier
- San José Buenavista
- San José de Cañas
- San José de Favelas
- San José de la Chaparra
- San José de las Flores
- San José del Bonete
- San José del Pachón
- San José del Pedernal
- San José del Ranchito
- San Juan de Camarones
- San Juan Viejo
- San Julián
- San Luisito
- San Manuel de la Galera
- San Martín
- San Miguel
- San Miguel de los Pinos (Rancho Viejo)
- San Miguel de Papasquiaro
- San Miguel del Alto
- San Miguel del Cantil
- San Nicolás
- San Pablo
- San Pedro de Tenerapa
- San Rafael
- San Ramón
- Sandovales
- Santa Cruz
- Santa Cruz de los Ojitos
- Santa Cruz de Macos
- Santa Efigenia
- Santa Marina
- Santa Rit
- Santa Rita del Pachón
- Santa Teresa del Llano
- Santa Teresa del Pachón
- Santiago Papasquiaro
- Sacedo (La Cueva de Saucedo)
- Soyupa
- Tablas Grandes
- Tapascual
- Tarimoros de Arriba
- Vascogil
- Vasitos
- Vivero Forestal (Emiliano Zapata).

== Notable people ==
Santiago de Baca Ortiz (1787-1832)

First Constitutional Governor of the state of Durango, declared elected governor by an act of the State Constituent Congress on May 10, 1827, and started exerting the power in June of the same year.

José Ramón Valdés (1888-1974)

Worked as a teacher without the title, being a "Maestro de las Primeras Letras" which means a person who teaches a craft and basic education.

Pedro Argüelles (1861-1936)

History professor, who studied in his native city, Santiago Papasquiaro, then moved to Durango to enter a seminar. For continue his education, he moved to Mexico city where he graduated with Literature Bachelor.
