= Harry Leonard Sawatzky =

Harry Leonard Sawatzky (10 February 1931 – 30 April 2008) was a Canadian scholar in the field of human geography.

Sawatzky grew up in a traditional Plautdietsch-speaking Russian Mennonite community in southern Manitoba. He got his BA from the University of Manitoba in 1961. In 1963 he got his MA and in 1967 his PhD, both from the University of California, Berkeley. In 1963 he began his teaching at the University of Manitoba.

== Works ==
- They Sought a Country: Mennonite Colonization in Mexico, with an appendix on Mennonite colonization in British Honduras. Berkeley, University of California, 1971.
- Sie suchten eine Heimat : deutsch-mennonitische Kolonisierung in Mexiko, 1922 - 1984, Marburg 1986. (This book is not just a German translation of They Sought a Country, as the title seems to indicate, but a work of its own.)
