= Nuevo Ideal Municipality =

Municipality in the Mexican state of Durango

Nuevo Ideal
- Municipality
- Location in Mexico
- Coordinates: 23°51′N 104°15′W
- Country: Mexico
- State: Durango
- Municipal seat: Nuevo Ideal

Population (2010)
  - Total: 26,092

Nuevo Ideal is a municipality in the Mexican state of Durango. The municipal seat lies at Nuevo Ideal.

Nuevo Ideal was formerly known as "Estación Patos," and part of the Canatlán Municipality.

As of 2010, the municipality had a total population of 26,092.

As of 2010, the city of Nuevo Ideal had a population of 10,876. Other than the city of Nuevo Ideal, the municipality had 182 localities, the largest of which (with 2010 populations in parentheses) were: Esfuerzos Unidos (1,083) and Guatimapé (1,083), classified as rural.
