= Santiago Papasquiaro =

City in the Mexican state of Durango

- Municipal Seat and city
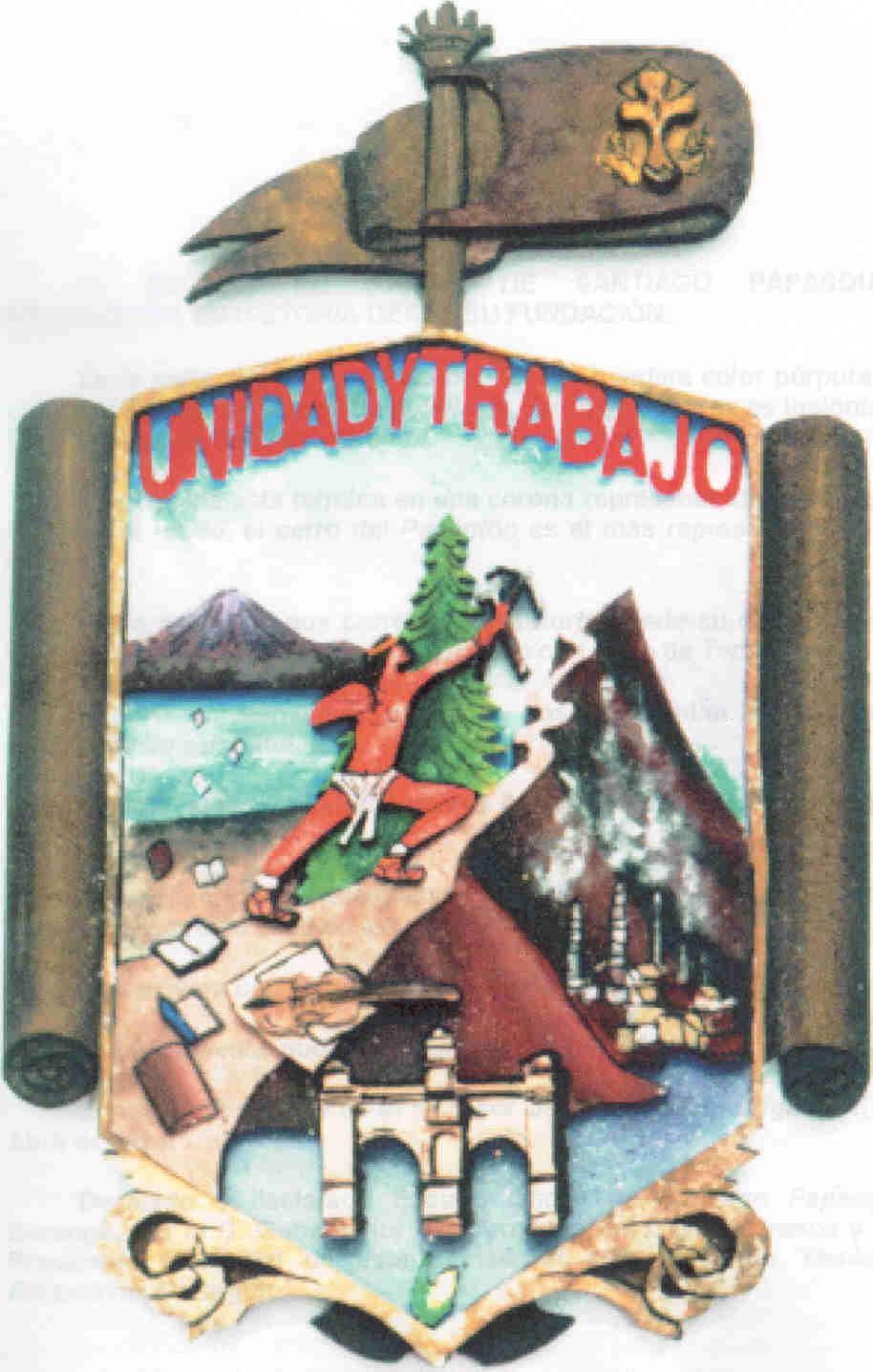
- Coat of arms

- Location within Durango Location within Mexico
- Coordinates: 25°02′38″N 105°25′09″W
- Country: Mexico
- State: Durango
- Municipality: Santiago Papasquiaro
- Established: 22 July 1597

Area
  - Total: 7,238 km^{2} (2,795 sq mi)
- Elevation: 1,750 m (5,740 ft)

Population (2015)
  - Total: 26,121
- Time zone: UTC-6 (Central)
- Postal code: 34630
- Area code: 674

Santiago Papasquiaro is a city located in a valley situated on the eastern slopes of the Sierra Madre Occidental in the Mexican state of Durango. As of 2010, the city of Santiago Papasquiaro had a population of 26,121, while the municipality has a census population of 48,482 as of 2015. It is the fourth largest community in the state in terms of population, and is the municipal seat of the municipality of the same name. The municipality has an area of 7,238.4 km^{2} (2,794.8 sq mi).

During the past few years, the city's infrastructure has improved vastly. Agriculture is a vital part of the city's economy, preserving Northern Tepehuán (Ódami) traditions of maize and ceramics from communities like El Jaguey and El Huisache. Santiago Papasquiaro is also the home of Mexican Army's 71st Infantry Battalion barracks.

== Geography ==
=== Climate ===
Climate data for Santiago Papasquiaro (1991–2020)
| Month | Jan | Feb | Mar | Apr | May | Jun | Jul | Aug | Sep | Oct | Nov | Dec | Year |
|---|---|---|---|---|---|---|---|---|---|---|---|---|---|
| Record high °C (°F) | 36.0 (96.8) | 39.0 (102.2) | 42.0 (107.6) | 45.0 (113.0) | 44.5 (112.1) | 42.0 (107.6) | 44.0 (111.2) | 43.0 (109.4) | 42.0 (107.6) | 40.0 (104.0) | 36.0 (96.8) | 35.0 (95.0) | 45.0 (113.0) |
| Mean daily maximum °C (°F) | 21.9 (71.4) | 24.4 (75.9) | 27.8 (82.0) | 30.9 (87.6) | 33.4 (92.1) | 33.8 (92.8) | 31.5 (88.7) | 30.6 (87.1) | 29.2 (84.6) | 28.1 (82.6) | 24.9 (76.8) | 21.8 (71.2) | 28.2 (82.8) |
| Daily mean °C (°F) | 11.9 (53.4) | 13.8 (56.8) | 16.6 (61.9) | 19.8 (67.6) | 22.7 (72.9) | 24.3 (75.7) | 23.1 (73.6) | 22.5 (72.5) | 21.2 (70.2) | 18.5 (65.3) | 14.7 (58.5) | 12.0 (53.6) | 18.4 (65.1) |
| Mean daily minimum °C (°F) | 1.8 (35.2) | 3.1 (37.6) | 5.3 (41.5) | 8.6 (47.5) | 12.0 (53.6) | 14.8 (58.6) | 14.7 (58.5) | 14.4 (57.9) | 13.2 (55.8) | 9.0 (48.2) | 4.5 (40.1) | 2.2 (36.0) | 8.6 (47.5) |
| Record low °C (°F) | −10.0 (14.0) | −9.0 (15.8) | −6.0 (21.2) | −7.8 (18.0) | 0.0 (32.0) | 0.0 (32.0) | 0.0 (32.0) | 1.0 (33.8) | 0.0 (32.0) | −2.0 (28.4) | −7.0 (19.4) | −10.0 (14.0) | −10.0 (14.0) |
| Average precipitation mm (inches) | 14.4 (0.57) | 7.7 (0.30) | 9.8 (0.39) | 5.1 (0.20) | 10.7 (0.42) | 71.7 (2.82) | 151.5 (5.96) | 147.6 (5.81) | 101.9 (4.01) | 30.4 (1.20) | 10.9 (0.43) | 5.9 (0.23) | 567.6 (22.35) |
| Average precipitation days (≥ 0.1 mm) | 3.8 | 2.7 | 1.8 | 2.0 | 5.1 | 14.1 | 21.6 | 22.2 | 18.1 | 8.5 | 2.9 | 3.2 | 106.0 |
Source: Servicio Meteorologico Nacional

== Notable people ==
- Marlene Favela, model and actress (born in Santiago Papasquiaro)
- Silvestre Revueltas, composer, violinist, and conductor (born in Santiago Papasquiaro)
- Gabriel Rivera-Barraza, famous fashion publicist & philanthropist in New York City (born in Santiago Papasquiaro)
