= Nuevo Ideal =

City in the Mexican state of Durango

- Municipal seat and city
- Location within Mexico
- Coordinates: 24°53′15″N 105°04′22″W
- Elevation: 1,995 m (6,545 ft)

Population (2020)
  - Total: 12,850
- Postal Code: 34410
- Area code: 677

Nuevo Ideal is a city in the Mexican state of Durango. In the 1920s, a population of Mennonite immigrants, originating from Canada, settled in the area. As of 2020, Nuevo Ideal had a population of 12,850. The city is located on the eastern slopes of the Sierra Madre Occidental.
